= Mike Mucitelli =

American mixed martial arts fighter

- Born: Michael Mucitelli; December 7, 1983 (age 42); Rochester, New York, United States
- Other names: Crazy
- Nationality: American
- Height: 6 ft 5 in (1.96 m)
- Weight: 205 lb (93 kg; 14.6 st)
- Division: Heavyweight (265 lb); Light Heavyweight (205 lb)
- Reach: 77.0 in (196 cm)
- Fighting out of: Syracuse, New York, United States
- Team: Tai-Kai
- Years active: 2010–present

Mixed martial arts record
- Total: 11
- Wins: 7
- By knockout: 1
- By submission: 5
- By decision: 1
- Losses: 3
- By knockout: 2
- By decision: 1
- No contests: 1

Other information
- Mixed martial arts record from Sherdog

Michael Mucitelli (born December 7, 1983) is an American professional mixed martial artist who competed in Bellator's Light Heavyweight division.

== Background ==
Mucitelli was born in Rochester, New York, but his family moved to Syracuse, New York when he was very young. In 2013, he advocated for New York to "legalize mixed martial arts" stating that MMA gave him "something that I could get excited about," and "A reason not to go out drinking. A reason to eat right. A reason to stay in shape. It's given me a leadership role in my community. It has really changed my life for the positive."

During high school, Mucitelli practiced football, basketball and baseball and earned multiple honors within these sports. Influenced by a roommate, Mucitelli has also practiced capoeira.

== Mixed martial arts career ==
=== Early career ===
Mucitelli started his professional career in 2010. After two victories, he signed with Bellator.

=== Bellator Fighting Championships ===
Mucitelli made his debut on August 24, 2012 at Bellator 73 against then undefeated Matt Van Buren, taking the fight on one week's notice. He won via submission in the first round.

Mucitelli was scheduled to face Dan McGuane on November 16, 2012 at Bellator 81. However, the fight was scrapped after the negative impact caused when a felony charge of involuntary manslaughter committed in July 2005 by McGuane was exposed in the internet. Mucitelli instead faced Shark Fights veteran Matt Uhde in a catchweight bout, which he won via submission in the first round.

Mucitelli faced Brent Dillingham on March 21, 2013 at Bellator 93. For the fifth time in a row he won in the first round, again via submission.

Mucitelli faced Jeff Nader on September 7, 2013 at Bellator 98. The fight ended in a no contest at 1:30 in the first round due to an accidental eye poke that rendered Nader unable to continue.

Mucitelli face Ryan McCurdy on November 8, 2013, at Bellator 107. This marked Mucitelli's first fight out of the first round, as it went the distance with Mucitelli pulling out a hard fought unanimous decision (29–28, 29–28, 29–28).

Mucitelli faced Liam McGeary in the 2014 Summer Series Light Heavyweight Tournament Quarterfinals at Bellator 118 on May 2, 2014. He lost via first-round knockout.

Mucitelli then faced Mark Griffin on September 5, 2014 at Bellator 123. Mucitelli won the fight via armbar submission in just 37 seconds of round one.

== Mixed martial arts record ==
Professional record breakdown
11 matches	7 wins	3 losses
By knockout	1	2
By submission	5	0
By decision	1	1
No contests	1	

Res.	Record	Opponent	Method	Event	Date	Round	Time	Location	Notes
Loss	7–3 (1)	Greg Rebello	KO (punch)	CES 31	October 30, 2015	1	3:24	Lincoln, Rhode Island, United States	Fought at Heavyweight
Loss	7–2 (1)	Tyler King	Decision (unanimous)	CES 28: Hawn vs. Loffer	March 13, 2015	3	5:00	Lincoln, Rhode Island, United States	Fought at Heavyweight
Win	7–1 (1)	Mark Griffin	Submission (armbar)	Bellator 123	September 5, 2014	1	0:37	Uncasville, Connecticut, United States	
Loss	6–1 (1)	Liam McGeary	KO (punch)	Bellator 118	May 2, 2014	1	0:22	Atlantic City, New Jersey, United States	2014 Summer Series Light Heavyweight Tournament Quarterfinal
Win	6–0 (1)	Ryan McCurdy	Decision (unanimous)	Bellator 107	November 8, 2013	3	5:00	Thackerville, Oklahoma, United States	
NC	5–0 (1)	Jeff Nader	No contest	Bellator 98	September 7, 2013	1	1:30	Uncasville, Connecticut, United States	Mucitelli inadvertently poked Nader in the eye.
Win	5–0	Brent Dillingham	Submission (armbar)	Bellator 93	March 21, 2013	1	2:48	Lewiston, Maine, United States	
Win	4–0	Matt Uhde	Submission (armbar)	Bellator 81	November 16, 2012	1	0:26	Kingston, Rhode Island, United States	210 lb catchweight bout.
Win	3–0	Matt Van Buren	Submission (triangle choke)	Bellator 73	August 24, 2012	1	3:01	Tunica Resorts, Mississippi, United States	
Win	2–0	Eddie Hardison	Submission (rear-naked choke)	MF - Matrix Fights 6	July 13, 2012	1	1:54	Philadelphia, Pennsylvania, United States	
Win	1–0	Steve Skrzat	TKO (doctor stoppage)	CES MMA - Cage of Horrors	October 22, 2010	1	5:00	Mashantucket, Connecticut, United States	
