= Justin Baesman =

American mixed martial arts fighter

- Born: Justin Baesman; June 3, 1981 (age 45); Pittsburg, California, United States
- Other names: Baby Boy
- Height: 5 ft 10 in (1.78 m)
- Weight: 170.5 lb (77.3 kg; 12.18 st)
- Division: Welterweight; Middleweight
- Reach: 69.0 in (175 cm)
- Stance: Orthodox
- Fighting out of: Susanville, California, United States
- Team: MMA Gold; Fightkore MMA
- Years active: 2008-present

Mixed martial arts record
- Total: 50
- Wins: 23
- By knockout: 0
- By submission: 0
- By decision: 23
- Losses: 26
- By knockout: 12
- By submission: 8
- By decision: 6
- Draws: 1

Other information
- Mixed martial arts record from Sherdog

Justin Baesman (born June 3, 1981) is an American professional mixed martial artist currently competing in the Welterweight division. A professional competitor since 2008, he has competed for mainly small market local fight promotions, Bellator, the World Series of Fighting, Tachi Palace Fights, Bare Knuckle Fighting Championship, Glory and King of the Cage.

== Mixed martial arts career ==
=== Early career ===
Baesman began training in mixed martial arts in 2004 and held an undefeated amateur record of 3-0 before turning professional. Baesman compiled a professional record of 14–3, winning the Gladiator Challenge Middleweight Championship along the way, before signing with Bellator.

=== Bellator ===
Baesman made his promotional debut against Brent Weedman at Bellator 100 on September 20, 2013 in the Bellator Season Nine Welterweight Tournament Quarterfinal. Baesman was defeated in the first round via armbar submission.

Baesman made his next appearance against Herman Terrado at Bellator 115 on April 4, 2014. The fight was ruled a draw.

Baesman then faced Andrey Koreshkov at Bellator 118 on May 2, 2014. Baesman was defeated in the first round after he was knocked out by a flying knee, the first knockout loss of his career.

Baesman made his next appearance at Bellator 127 against John Mercurio on October 3, 2014. Baesman won via split decision.

== Bare knuckle boxing ==
Baesman made his debut for Bare Knuckle Fighting Championship on April 6, 2019 at BKFC 5. He faced Chris Leben in the show's co-main event. Baesman lost the fight via knockout 25 seconds into the first round.

Baesman was scheduled to face Chris Cisneros on April 11, 2026 at BKFC Fight Night 36. However, for unknown reasons, Baesman was replaced by Namakana Pakala.

== Personal life ==
Baesman is married and has two daughters.

== Championships and accomplishments ==
- Gladiator Challenge
  - Gladiator Challenge Welterweight Championship (One time)
- Global Knockout
  - GKO Middleweight Championship (One time)

== Mixed martial arts record ==
Professional record breakdown
50 matches	23 wins	26 losses
By knockout	7	12
By submission	4	8
By decision	12	6
Draws	1	

Res.	Record	Opponent	Method	Event	Date	Round	Time	Location	Notes
Loss	23–26–1	Aleko Sagliani	TKO (punches)	High Desert Brawl 16	September 9, 2023	1		Susanville, California, United States	
Loss	23–25–1	Joaquin Lopez	TKO	PureCombat: Battle Cry 2	May 20, 2023	1	3:21	Lakeport, California, United States	Middleweight bout.
Loss	23–24–1	Scottie Stockman	TKO (punches)	Primal Fighting Championship: Gladiators Collide	January 14, 2023	1	1:25	Redding, California, United States	
Win	23–23–1	Brady Minner	Decision (unanimous)	DCS 82	December 3, 2022	3	5:00	Lincoln, Nebraska, United States	
Loss	22–23–1	Dakota Cochrane	Submission (arm-triangle choke)	DCS 77	January 14, 2022	2	3:52	Omaha, Nebraska, United States	For the vacant DCS Vacant Welterweight Championship.
Win	22–22–1	Daniel McWilliams	TKO (punches)	NWFA 1: Retribution	August 28, 2021	2	4:23	Bentonville, Arkansas, United States	Middleweight bout.
Win	21–22–1	Aaron Hedrick	KO (body kick and punches)	KOTC: Return to Order	January 11, 2020	1	0:42	Oroville, California, United States	
Win	20–22–1	Chris Ensley	Submission (guillotine choke)	High Desert Brawl 14	August 10, 2019	1	1:21	Susanville, California, United States	
Loss	19–22–1	Randall Wallace	TKO (punches)	Global Knockout 13	June 29, 2019	1	3:43	Jackson, California, United States	
Loss	19–21–1	Keith Berry	TKO (punches)	Gladiator Challenge: Berry vs. Baesman	June 1, 2019	1	1:31	Hemet, California, United States	
Loss	19–20–1	Mikey Gonzalez	Decision (unanimous)	Dragon House 30	November 10, 2018	3	5:00	San Francisco, California, United States	
Loss	19–19–1	Mikey Gonzalez	TKO (punches)	Dragon House 29	July 21, 2018	1	3:35	San Francisco, California, United States	
Loss	19–18–1	Mike Jasper	TKO (punches)	CXF 12: Burbank Beatdown	April 21, 2018	1	4:57	Burbank, California, United States	For the CXF Welterweight Championship.
Loss	19–17–1	Angelo Trevino	Decision (unanimous)	KOTC: No Escape	April 14, 2018	3	5:00	Oroville, California, United States	
Loss	19–16–1	Daniel Rodriguez	TKO (punches)	CXF 11: Alpha Dog	February 17, 2018	2	1:17	Studio City, California, United States	
Loss	19–15–1	Aaron Hedrick	Decision (unanimous)	KOTC: Last Stand	October 7, 2017	3	5:00	Oroville, California, United States	Returned to Welterweight.
Loss	19–14–1	Brandon Hester	Submission (rear-naked choke)	Global Knockout 10	August 5, 2017	1	1:48	Jackson, California, United States	
Loss	19–13–1	Ben Egli	Submission (rear-naked choke)	KOTC: Headstrong	May 27, 2017	1	3:08	Lincoln City, Oregon, United States	For the KOTC Welterweight Championship.
Loss	19–12–1	Angel DeAnda	TKO (punches)	Global Knockout 9	March 18, 2017	3	3:20	Jackson, California, United States	Lost GKO Middleweight Championship.
Loss	19–11–1	James Terry	Decision (unanimous)	Bellator 165	November 19, 2016	3	5:00	San Jose, California, United States	Welterweight bout.
Loss	19–10–1	Mauricio Alonso	Decision (unanimous)	Dragon House 23	August 20, 2016	3	5:00	San Francisco, California, United States	For vacant Dragon House Middleweight Championship.
Loss	19–9–1	Angel DeAnda	TKO (punches)	Tachi Palace Fights 27	May 19, 2016	2	1:54	Lemoore, California, United States	
Win	19–8–1	Nicolas Kohring	Decision (unanimous)	Global Knockout 6	March 26, 2016	5	5:00	Jackson, California, United States	Defended GKO Middleweight Championship.
Win	18–8–1	Scott Smith	TKO (punches)	WFC 16: King of Sacramento	January 23, 2016	2	0:57	Sacramento, California, United States	Welterweight bout.
Win	17–8–1	Nicolas Kohring	Decision (split)	Global Knockout 5	November 21, 2015	5	5:00	Jackson, California, United States	Returned to Middleweight; Won GKO Middleweight Championship.
Loss	16–8–1	Randall Wallace	Decision (split)	Global Knockout 4	August 29, 2015	3	5:00	Jackson, California, United States	
Loss	16–7–1	Randall Wallace	TKO (punches)	Global Knockout 3	March 21, 2015	1	2:00	Jackson, California, United States	
Win	16–6–1	Randall Wallace	Decision (split)	WCF 13: Huckaba vs. Mitchell	February 28, 2015	3	5:00	Sacramento, California, United States	
Loss	15–6–1	David Mitchell	Submission (rear-naked choke)	WSOF 16	December 13, 2014	1	1:44	Sacramento, California, United States	Middleweight bout.
Win	15–5–1	John Mercurio	Decision (split)	Bellator 127	October 3, 2014	3	5:00	Temecula, California, United States	
Loss	14–5–1	Andrey Koreshkov	KO (flying knee)	Bellator 118	May 2, 2014	1	1:41	Atlantic City, New Jersey, United States	
Draw	14–4–1	Herman Terrado	Draw (majority)	Bellator 115	April 4, 2014	3	5:00	Reno, Nevada, United States	
Loss	14–4	Brent Weedman	Submission (armbar)	Bellator 100	September 20, 2013	1	3:20	Phoenix, Arizona, United States	
Win	14–3	Daniel Roberts	Decision (split)	War MMA 1: Roberts vs. Baesman	June 23, 2013	3	5:00	Stockton, California, United States	Returned to Welterweight.
Win	13–3	Robert Sarkozi	Decision (split)	Gladiator Challenge: American Dream	May 18, 2013	3	3:00	Lincoln, California, United States	Middleweight debut; Won Gladiator Challenge Middleweight Championship.
Win	12–3	Mikhail Venikov	Submission (rear-naked choke)	WFC 5: Andrews vs. Griffin	May 3, 2013	2	2:43	Sacramento, California, United States	
Win	11–3	Tony Johnson	Decision (split)	DH: Dragon House 13	February 2, 2013	3	5:00	Oakland, California, United States	
Loss	10–3	Kito Andrews	Submission (strikes)	WFC: Resolution	September 8, 2012	1	1:36	Yuba City, California, United States	
Win	10–2	Max Griffin	Decision (split)	WFC: Showdown	June 9, 2012	5	5:00	Yuba City, California, United States	
Win	9–2	Jaime Jara	Decision (unanimous)	KOTC: All In	April 21, 2012	3	5:00	Oroville, California, United States	
Win	8–2	Jack Montgomery	TKO (punches)	Gladiator Challenge: Justified	March 10, 2012	1	2:36	Elko, Nevada, United States	
Win	7–2	Jeff Morris	TKO (punches)	Gladiator Challenge: Mega Stars	December 11, 2011	1	N/A	Lincoln, California, United States	
Loss	6–2	Lewis Gonzalez	Submission (strikes)	KOTC: Cage Quest	November 12, 2011	1	2:00	Oroville, California, United States	
Win	6–1	Carlos Canez	Submission	Gladiator Challenge: Unleashed	August 27, 2011	2	N/A	Lincoln, California, United States	
Loss	5–1	Jaime Jara	Submission (rear-naked choke)	Gladiator Challenge: Warpath	May 21, 2011	2	3:32	Placerville, California, United States	
Win	5–0	Jack Montgomery	TKO (punches)	Gladiator Challenge: High Octane	March 19, 2011	2	0:25	Placerville, California, United States	
Win	4–0	Kyle Bledsoe	TKO (punches)	Gladiator Challenge: Impulse	November 13, 2010	1	2:59	Placerville, California, United States	
Win	3–0	Daniel Schmitt	Decision (unanimous)	URC 3: Ultimate Reno Combat 3	March 21, 2009	3	5:00	Reno, Nevada, United States	
Win	2–0	Sean Neeley	Submission (rear-naked choke)	URC 2: Ultimate Reno Combat 2	February 7, 2009	2	4:05	Reno, Nevada, United States	
Win	1–0	Jose Rico	Decision (unanimous)	EWC 4: Welterweight War	February 23, 2008	3	5:00	Salem, Oregon, United States	

== Kickboxing record ==
0 wins (0 KO), 1 loss, 0 draws
Date	Result	Opponent	Event	Location	Method	Round	Time	Record
2015-05-08	Loss	(United States) Raymond Daniels	Glory 21: San Diego	San Diego, California, USA	KO (liver kick)	1	0:51	0–1

== Bareknuckle boxing record ==
Professional record breakdown
1 match	0 wins	1 loss
By knockout	0	1

Res.	Record	Opponent	Method	Event	Date	Round	Time	Location	Notes
Loss	0-1	Chris Leben	KO (punches)	BKFC 5	April 6, 2019	1	0:25	Biloxi, Mississippi, United States	
