= Jesus Martinez (fighter) =

American mixed martial arts fighter

- Born: December 26, 1983 (age 42); Philadelphia, Pennsylvania, United States
- Other names: Chavo
- Height: 5 ft 10 in (1.78 m)
- Weight: 186 lb (84 kg; 13.3 st)
- Division: Middleweight (185 lb); Welterweight (170 lb)
- Reach: 67.0 in (170 cm)
- Fighting out of: Philadelphia, Pennsylvania, United States
- Team: Team Balance; Martinez BJJ
- Rank: black belt in Brazilian jiu-jitsu under Carlos Machado
- Years active: 2008–present

Mixed martial arts record
- Total: 15
- Wins: 9
- By knockout: 3
- By submission: 2
- By decision: 4
- Losses: 6
- By knockout: 5
- By decision: 1

Other information
- Notable relatives: Will Martinez, brother
- Mixed martial arts record from Sherdog

Jesus Martinez (born December 26, 1983) is an American mixed martial artist who competes in Bellator's welterweight division.

== Mixed martial arts career ==
=== Early career ===
Martinez started his professional career in 2009. He fought mainly for New Jersey and Pennsylvania-based promotions as Ring of Combat and Xtreme Fight Events.

In 2011, with a record of six victories and only one loss, Martinez signed with Bellator.

=== Bellator MMA ===
Martinez made his promotional debut against Karl Amoussou on November 26, 2011, at Bellator 59. Martinez lost via TKO in the first round.

Martinez faced Aung La Nsang on May 11, 2012, at Bellator 68. Despite being dropped with a right hand early, Nsang was able to recover and defeat Martinez via TKO still in the first round.

=== Cage Fury Fighting Championships ===
Martinez faced George Sullivan on August 17, 2013, at CFFC 26: Sullivan vs. Martinez for the CFFC welterweight title. He lost via TKO in the second round.

=== Bellator return ===
Martinez replaced Dante Rivera against Nah-Shon Burrell on November 15, 2013, at Bellator 108. He lost the fight via unanimous decision (30–27, 30–27, 29–28). Martinez was then expected to face Phil Baroni on May 2, 2014, at Bellator 118, however the bout was cancelled for unknown reasons, and Martinez instead faced Ryan Caltaldi at the event. He won the bout via unanimous decision.

== Mixed martial arts record ==
Professional record breakdown
15 matches	9 wins	6 losses
By knockout	3	5
By submission	2	0
By decision	4	1

Res.	Record	Opponent	Method	Event	Date	Round	Time	Location	Notes
Loss	9–6	LeVon Maynard	TKO (punches)	Matrix Fights 9	December 5, 2014	2	4:37	Philadelphia, Pennsylvania, United States	
Win	9–5	Ryan Caltaldi	Decision (unanimous)	Bellator 118	May 2, 2014	3	5:00	Atlantic City, New Jersey, United States	187 catchweight bout
Loss	8–5	Nah-Shon Burrell	Decision (unanimous)	Bellator 108	November 15, 2013	3	5:00	Atlantic City, New Jersey, United States	180 lb catchweight bout.
Loss	8–4	George Sullivan	TKO (punches)	CFFC 26: Sullivan vs. Martinez	August 17, 2013	2	3:12	Atlantic City, New Jersey, United States	For CFFC welterweight title.
Win	8–3	Chase Owens	KO (punches)	Xtreme Fight Events: Cage Wars 22	April 6, 2013	1	1:04	Chester, Pennsylvania, United States	180 lb catchweight bout.
Win	7–3	Tiawan Howard	Submission (armbar)	Matrix Fights 7	October 26, 2012	1	3:10	Philadelphia, Pennsylvania, United States	
Loss	6–3	Aung La Nsang	TKO (punches)	Bellator 68	May 11, 2012	1	0:36	Atlantic City, New Jersey, United States	175 lb catchweight bout.
Loss	6–2	Karl Amoussou	TKO (punches)	Bellator 59	November 26, 2011	1	2:20	Atlantic City, New Jersey, United States	175 lb catchweight bout.
Win	6–1	Christopher Wing	KO (head kick)	Matrix Fights 4	April 22, 2011	2	1:16	Philadelphia, Pennsylvania, United States	
Loss	5–1	Doug Gordon	TKO (punches)	Xtreme Fight Events: Cage Wars 4	December 10, 2010	1	0:50	Boothwyn, Pennsylvania, United States	For XFE welterweight title.
Win	5–0	Chip Moraza-Pollard	Decision (unanimous)	KOTC: No Mercy	September 17, 2010	3	5:00	Mashantucket, Connecticut, United States	
Win	4–0	Eddie Larrea	Decision (unanimous)	Xtreme Fight Events: Cage Wars 2	June 19, 2010	3	5:00	Broomall, Pennsylvania, United States	
Win	3–0	Cory Popanz	Submission (guillotine choke)	Locked in the Cage 4	May 14, 2010	1	0:23	Philadelphia, Pennsylvania, United States	
Win	2–0	Dustin Carroll	TKO (punches)	Xtreme Fight Events: Cage Wars	March 27, 2010	1	1:06	Aston, Pennsylvania, United States	
Win	1–0	Jim Tomczuk	Decision (unanimous)	Ring of Combat 27	November 20, 2009	3	4:00	Atlantic City, New Jersey, United States	
