= Dante Rivera =

American mixed martial arts (MMA) fighter

- Born: August 12, 1974 (age 52); Manhattan, New York, U.S.
- Height: 6 ft 0 in (1.83 m)
- Weight: 170 lb (77 kg; 12 st)
- Division: Light Heavyweight (2007); Middleweight (2002–2010); Welterweight (2013–2014)
- Fighting out of: Hamilton, New Jersey
- Team: Ricardo Almeida Jiu-Jitsu
- Rank: 4th degree black belt in BJJ under Ricardo Almeida
- Years active: 2002–2014

Mixed martial arts record
- Total: 23
- Wins: 16
- By knockout: 3
- By submission: 8
- By decision: 5
- Losses: 7
- By knockout: 1
- By submission: 1
- By decision: 5

Other information
- Mixed martial arts record from Sherdog

Dante Rivera (born August 12, 1974) is an American retired mixed martial artist. He was a cast member of SpikeTV's The Ultimate Fighter 7 making it to the quarterfinals where he was defeated by Jesse Taylor.

Rivera is the owner of Dante Rivera Brazilian Jiu-Jitsu in Freehold Township, New Jersey.

== Mixed martial arts career ==
=== The Ultimate Fighter ===
Dante was selected to be a part of the seventh season of The Ultimate Fighter. In order to get into the house and actually compete on the show, Rivera had to fight John Wood, a training partner of Forrest Griffin. Rivera defeated Wood via kimura submission and was then selected to be a part of Griffin's team. In the first round of the tournament, Rivera was matched up against Brandon Sene, defeating him via decision and moving him onto the next round. Rivera's next fight came against teammate Jesse Taylor. Taylor defeated Rivera via unanimous decision and ended Rivera's chances of winning the show.

During the show, Rivera was consistently shown arguing with the young and inexperienced Matt Riddle. Dante, on more the one occasion, stated that he would retire if Riddle defeated him.

=== Ultimate Fighting Championship ===
Dante fought Matt Riddle at the TUF 7 Finale. Dante was defeated by Riddle via decision (30-27, 30-27, 29-28). When asked by Joe Rogan if he will retire as he had stated on The Ultimate Fighter, Dante declined and said he would continue to fight. After the loss, he was released from his contract.

=== Post UFC ===
He made his post UFC debut against a castoff from The Ultimate Fighter 7, Paul Bradley. Rivera was defeated after being knocked out before the minute mark. He bounced back with a win over Lamont Lister and a win over WEC vet, Justin Haskins.

Rivera fought fellow TUF alumni, Dan Cramer, for a small New Jersey promotion. After three rounds, the fight went to the judges and Rivera was awarded the victory via split decision (30-27, 28-29, 30-27). Many spectators were upset with the decision believing that Rivera had dominated the fight and had convincingly won all three rounds. According to his Twitter he frequently works to increase his cardio by innovating the art of dynamic rollerblading.

=== Bellator MMA ===
Rivera made his promotional debut against former Bellator welterweight champion Lyman Good on April 4, 2013 at Bellator 95. Good defeated Rivera via unanimous decision (30-27, 30-27, 29-28).

Rivera was expected to face promotional newcomer Nah-Shon Burrell on November 15, 2013 at Bellator 108. However, Rivera was removed from the card due to undisclosed reasons and Burrell was rescheduled to face Jesus Martinez. Dante Rivera won his last Bellator fight win a dominant performance against tough fighter Gemiyale Adkins.

== Mixed martial arts record ==
Professional record breakdown
23 matches	16 wins	7 losses
By knockout	3	1
By submission	8	1
By decision	5	5

Res.	Record	Opponent	Method	Event	Date	Round	Time	Location	Notes
Win	16–7	Gemiyale Adkins	Decision (unanimous)	Bellator 118	May 2, 2014	3	5:00	Atlantic City, New Jersey, United States	Catchweight (172 lbs) bout; Adkins missed weight.
Loss	15–7	Lyman Good	Decision (unanimous)	Bellator 95	April 4, 2013	3	5:00	Atlantic City, New Jersey, United States	Welterweight debut.
Win	15–6	Dan Cramer	Decision (split)	Elite MMA: MMA Mayhem	June 19, 2010	3	5:00	Jackson, New Jersey, United States	
Win	14–6	Ryan Contaldi	Submission	UCC 2: Strikedown	May 14, 2010	2	3:20	Jersey City, New Jersey, United States	
Loss	13–6	Herbert Goodman	Decision (unanimous)	Adrenaline MMA: New Breed	February 26, 2010	3	5:00	Atlantic City, New Jersey, United States	For the vacant Adrenaline MMA Middleweight Championship.
Win	13–5	Justin Haskins	Submission (rear naked choke)	Ring of Combat 27	November 20, 2009	2	3:51	Atlantic City, New Jersey, United States	
Win	12–5	Lamont Lister	Submission (guillotine choke)	Ring of Combat 24	April 17, 2009	1	1:25	Atlantic City, New Jersey, United States	
Loss	11–5	Paul Bradley	TKO (punches)	Ring of Combat 22	November 21, 2008	1	0:34	Atlantic City, New Jersey, United States	For the vacant Ring of Combat Middleweight Championship.
Loss	11–4	Matt Riddle	Decision (unanimous)	The Ultimate Fighter 7 Finale	June 21, 2008	3	5:00	Las Vegas, Nevada, United States	
Win	11–3	Nissim Levy	TKO	IFL: 2007 Semifinals	August 2, 2007	3	1:15	East Rutherford, New Jersey, United States	
Win	10–3	Alex Aquino	Submission (heel hook)	Cage Fury Fighting Championships 5	June 23, 2007	2	2:41	Atlantic City, New Jersey, United States	
Loss	9–3	Tim Kennedy	Submission (punches)	IFL: Atlanta	February 23, 2007	2	2:29	Atlanta, Georgia, United States	
Win	9–2	Eric Charles	Submission (arm triangle choke)	Cage Fury Fighting Championships 3	January 19, 2007	2	4:51	Atlantic City, New Jersey, United States	Won the CFFC Middleweight Championship.
Win	8–2	Eric Tavares	TKO (referee stoppage)	CITC 3: Marked Territory	September 30, 2006	1	4:44	Lincroft, New Jersey, United States	
Loss	7–2	Mike Massenzio	Decision (unanimous)	RF 13: Battle at the Beach	August 5, 2006	3	5:00	Wildwood, New Jersey, United States	
Win	7–1	Ronald Stallings	Decision (unanimous)	Reality Fighting 11	February 11, 2006	3	5:00	Atlantic City, New Jersey, United States	Defended the Reality Fighting Middleweight Championship.
Win	6–1	Jerry Spiegel	Submission (triangle choke)	Reality Fighting 10	November 19, 2005	1	1:26	Atlantic City, New Jersey, United States	Won the vacant Reality Fighting Middleweight Championship.
Win	5–1	Josh Pupa	Submission (guillotine choke)	Reality Fighting 9	August 6, 2005	1	3:59	Wildwood, New Jersey, United States	
Loss	4–1	Lance Everson	Decision (unanimous)	Reality Fighting 8	April 2, 2005	5	5:00	Atlantic City, New Jersey, United States	For the Reality Fighting Light Heavyweight Championship.
Win	4–0	Jose Rodriguez	TKO	Ring of Combat 7	November 20, 2004	1	4:37	New Jersey, United States	Won the vacant Ring of Combat Light Heavyweight Championship.
Win	3–0	Jay Handley	Submission (guillotine)	Reality Fighting 7	October 16, 2004	1	1:00	Atlantic City, New Jersey, United States	Catchweight (190 lbs) bout.
Win	2–0	Lionel Cortes	Decision	Reality Fighting 6	April 3, 2004	5	5:00	Wildwood, New Jersey, United States	Middleweight debut.
Win	1–0	Chris Scanlon	Decision (unanimous)	SF 1 - Bragging Rights	November 9, 2002	2	5:00	Bayonne, New Jersey, United States	

== See also ==
- List of Bellator MMA alumni
