= Scott Cleve =

American mixed martial arts fighter (born 1982)

- Born: July 22, 1982 (age 44); Long Beach, California, U.S.
- Nationality: American
- Height: 5 ft 9 in (1.75 m)
- Weight: 145.8 lb (66.1 kg; 10.41 st)
- Division: Featherweight; Lightweight
- Reach: 73.0 in (185 cm)
- Stance: Orthodox
- Fighting out of: Colorado Springs, Colorado, U.S.
- Team: Pariah MMA; Colorado Fight Factory
- Trainer: Drew Lawrence
- Years active: 2010–present

Mixed martial arts record
- Total: 21
- Wins: 15
- By knockout: 9
- By submission: 2
- By decision: 4
- Losses: 6
- By knockout: 1
- By submission: 3
- By decision: 2

Other information
- Mixed martial arts record from Sherdog

Scott Cleve (born July 22, 1982) is an American mixed martial artist who competed in Bellator's Featherweight division and the MFC.

== Background ==
Cleve was born in Long Beach, California and raised in Escondido, California, attending Escondido High School where he competed in wrestling and football. Cleve continued with wrestling on a scholarship at Adams State University, receiving All-American honors his senior season. Two years after graduating, Cleve began training in mixed martial arts.

== Mixed martial arts career ==
=== Early career ===
Cleve compiled an amateur record of 4–1, with the lone loss being against Justin Gaethje, before turning professional. From August 2010 to June 2013, Cleve amassed a record of 13–3, with most of his victories coming by KO/TKO. During this time, Cleve picked up notable victories over Abel Trujillo, Derek Campos and Ryan Schultz.

=== Bellator MMA ===
Cleve signed with Bellator and made his promotional debut on October 4, 2013 at Bellator 102 against Isaac DeJesus. He won the fight via TKO in the second round.

Cleve faced Daniel Weichel in the quarterfinals of Bellator's season ten featherweight tournament at Bellator 110. Cleve lost the fight via rear-naked choke submission in the first round.

Cleve fought Matt Bessette at Bellator 123 on September 5, 2014. Cleve won the fight via unanimous decision.

Cleve faced John Teixeira at Bellator 128 on October 10, 2014. He lost the fight via split decision.

Cleve next faced Noad Lahat at Bellator 164 on November 10, 2016. He lost the fight via submission in the first round. Some time after this fight, Cleve exited his contract with Bellator.

=== After Bellator ===
After a nearly six-year break, Cleve was scheduled to fight under the Battle Mixed Martial Arts promotion on 19 March 2022. However, he pulled out of the fight due to injury.

== Mixed martial arts record ==
Professional record breakdown
21 matches	15 wins	6 losses
By knockout	9	1
By submission	2	3
By decision	4	2

Res.	Record	Opponent	Method	Event	Date	Round	Time	Location	Notes
Loss	15–6	Noad Lahat	Submission (rear-naked choke)	Bellator 164	November 10, 2016	1	2:26	Tel Aviv, Israel	
Loss	15–5	John Macapá	Decision (split)	Bellator 128	October 10, 2014	3	5:00	Thackerville, Oklahoma, United States	
Win	15–4	Matt Bessette	Decision (unanimous)	Bellator 123	September 5, 2014	3	5:00	Uncasville, Connecticut, United States	
Loss	14–4	Daniel Weichel	Submission (rear-naked choke)	Bellator 110	February 28, 2014	1	3:46	Uncasville, Connecticut, United States	Bellator Season Ten Featherweight Tournament Quarterfinal.
Win	14–3	Isaac DeJesus	TKO (punches)	Bellator 102	October 4, 2013	2	3:14	Visalia, California, United States	
Win	13–3	Rocky Johnson	Submission (armbar)	NMEF: Annihilation 46: Made For War	June 28, 2013	3	4:20	Colorado Springs, Colorado, United States	
Win	12–3	Gilbert Jimenez	TKO (punches)	Made For War 2	April 5, 2013	2	2:37	Castle Rock, Colorado, United States	
Win	11–3	Ryan Schultz	KO (punches)	SCL: Rise of the King	December 8, 2012	1	3:04	Denver, Colorado, United States	
Win	10–3	Chris Manuel	Decision (unanimous)	Made For War 1	October 13, 2012	3	5:00	Castle Rock, Colorado, United States	Featherweight debut.
Win	9–3	Manuel Gallardo	TKO (punches)	Dollar D Promotions: Melon Thump'n 4	August 19, 2012	1	3:11	Rocky Ford, Colorado, United States	
Loss	8–3	Gilbert Jimenez	Submission (rear-naked choke)	UWF: Tournament of Warriors Round 1	May 4, 2012	3	3:17	Corpus Christi, Texas, United States	UWF Light Tournament Quarterfinal.
Win	8–2	Steve Berger	Submission (guillotine choke)	Cage Championships 37	April 7, 2012	1	1:02	Washington, Missouri, United States	
Win	7–2	Orlando Rodriguez	TKO (punches)	MFP: Vengeance	March 3, 2012	2	N/A	Casper, Wyoming, United States	
Win	6–2	Johnny Torres	TKO (head kick)	ROF 42: Who's Next	December 17, 2011	2	1:04	Broomfield, Colorado, United States	
Win	5–2	Derek Campos	Decision (split)	UWF 1: Huerta vs. War Machine	November 26, 2011	3	5:00	Pharr, Texas, United States	
Loss	4–2	Charles Jones	Decision (majority)	C3 Fights: Great Plains Sizzling Slamfest	July 30, 2011	3	5:00	Newkirk, Oklahoma, United States	
Loss	4–1	Mukai Maromo	TKO (punches)	MFC 30: Up Close & Personal	June 10, 2011	1	0:36	Edmonton, Alberta, United States	
Win	4–0	Abel Trujillo	Decision (split)	EB: Beatdown at 4 Bears 8	March 12, 2011	5	5:00	New Town, North Dakota, United States	
Win	3–0	Jos Eichelberger	TKO (punches)	Crowbar MMA: Winter Brawl	December 10, 2010	1	4:40	Grand Forks, North Dakota, United States	
Win	2–0	Ali Hanjani	TKO (punches)	NMEF: Annihilation 30	November 12, 2010	2	1:30	Colorado Springs, Colorado, United States	
Win	1–0	James Mead	TKO (punches)	Dollar D Promotions: Melon Thump'n 2	August 15, 2010	1	0:58	Rocky Ford, Colorado, United States	
