= John Macapá =

Brazilian mixed martial artist

John Teixeira
- Born: John Teixeira da Conceição; November 18, 1986 (age 39); Macapá, Amapá, Brazil
- Other names: Macapá
- Height: 5 ft 7 in (1.70 m)
- Weight: 145 lb (66 kg; 10.4 st)
- Division: Featherweight
- Reach: 68 in (173 cm)
- Fighting out of: Rio de Janeiro, Brazil
- Team: Nova União
- Rank: Black belt in Brazilian jiu-jitsu
- Years active: 2007–present

Mixed martial arts record
- Total: 43
- Wins: 28
- By knockout: 8
- By submission: 10
- By decision: 10
- Losses: 13
- By knockout: 2
- By submission: 1
- By decision: 10
- Draws: 2

Other information
- Mixed martial arts record from Sherdog

John Teixeira da Conceição (Portuguese: [tejˈʃejɾɐ]; born November 18, 1986), commonly known as John Macapá, is a Brazilian mixed martial artist currently competing in the featherweight division. A professional competitor since 2007, Teixeira has formerly competed for the Ultimate Fighting Championship, Bellator MMA, and was a contestant on The Ultimate Fighter: Brazil.

== Mixed martial arts career ==
=== Early career ===
From September 2007 to December 2011, Macapá amassed an undefeated record of 12–0–1, fighting exclusively in his native Brazil.

Macapá was ranked as the eighth best featherweight prospect in BloodyElbow.com's 2012 scouting report.

=== The Ultimate Fighter ===
In March 2012, it was revealed that Macapá would be a participant on The Ultimate Fighter: Brazil. In the entry round, Macapá defeated Giovanni da Silva Santos Jr. via submission in the first round to move into the house.

Macapá was picked third (fifth overall) by Wanderlei Silva to be on Team Wanderlei. He was then selected to face Rodrigo Damm in the quarterfinals of the tournament. He lost via split decision after three rounds.

=== Ultimate Fighting Championship ===
Macapá made his UFC debut at UFC 147 on June 23, 2012, against Hugo Viana at a catchweight of 150 lbs, after Macapá missed weight. He lost via split decision. Macapá was released from the promotion after his loss to Viana.

=== Bellator MMA ===
Macapá made his Bellator and United States debut at Bellator 128 on October 10, 2014, against Scott Cleve. He won the fight via split decision.

Macapá faced Fabrício Guerreiro at Bellator 136 on April 10, 2015. He won the fight by split decision.

Macapá next faced Gleristone Santos at Bellator 143 on September 25, 2015. He won the fight via split decision.

With three straight victories in Bellator, Macapá was set to face former Bellator Featherweight Champion, Patrício Freire, at Bellator 153 on April 22, 2016. A rib injury, however, forced Macapá out of the bout.

Macapá was again scheduled to face another former Bellator Featherweight Champion in Pat Curran, at Bellator 167 on December 3, 2016. However, an injury to Curran forced him out of the bout and, as a result, Macapá faced off against former UFC competitor Justin Lawrence. Throughout the fight, Macapá utilized leg kicks to nullify the movement of Lawrence, while continuously moving forward with power punches. After three rounds, Macapá was awarded a victory via unanimous decision.

Macapá faced Daniel Weichel at Bellator 177 on April 14, 2017. He lost the fight via split decision.

The bout with Curran was rescheduled for Bellator 184 on October 6, 2017. He lost the fight by unanimous decision.

Macapá faced A. J. McKee on September 21, 2018, at Bellator 205, replacing Pat Curran. He lost the fight via knockout in round one.

Macapá next faced Kevin Croom at Bellator 218 on March 22, 2019. He won the fight via unanimous decision.

Macapá then faced Ashleigh Grimshaw at Bellator 226 on September 7, 2019. He won the fight via technical knockout after the doctor stopped the fight before round three. Subsequently, he signed a new exclusive, multi-fight contract with Bellator.

As the first fight of his new contract, Macapá faced Mikuru Asakura at Rizin 20 on December 31, 2019. He lost the back-and-forth fight via unanimous decision.

Macapá faced John de Jesus at Bellator 261 on June 25, 2021. He lost the close bout via split decision.

On July 10, 2021, it was announced that he was no longer under contract with Bellator.

=== Absolute Championship Akhmat ===
Macapá faced Jaciel Lima on December 18, 2021, at Shooto Brasil 110. He won the bout via TKO in the first round.

Macapá faced Timur Nagibin on May 6, 2022, at RCC 11. He lost the bout via unanimous decision.

Macapá faced Abdul-Rakhman Dudaev on July 22, 2022, at ACA 141. He lost the bout after getting knocked out by a spinning backfist 44 seconds into the bout.

Macapá faced Mauricio Machado on October 28, 2022, at Shooto Brasil 111. He won the bout via TKO in the first round.

Macapá faced Akhmadkhan Bokov on March 9, 2023, at ACA 153: Dzhanaev vs. Pessoa, winning the bout via unanimous decision.

Macapá faced Alexander Kovalev on September 22, 2023, at ACA 163: Mamashov vs. Kolodko, winning the bout via TKO stoppage at the end of the third round.

Macapá faced Nashkho Galaev on February 25, 2024, at ACA 171: Gasanov vs. Magomedov, losing the bout via split decision.

== Personal life ==
Prior to becoming a fighter, Teixeira worked as a shop assistant and motorcycle courier.

In October 2013, Teixeira's home was among hundreds destroyed in a fire tragedy in Macapá, Brazil.

== Mixed martial arts record ==
Professional record breakdown
43 matches	28 wins	13 losses
By knockout	8	2
By submission	10	1
By decision	10	10
Draws	2	

Res.	Record	Opponent	Method	Event	Date	Round	Time	Location	Notes
Loss	28–13–1	Brandon Girtz	Decision (split)	Gamebred Bareknuckle MMA 10	May 1, 2026	3	5:00	Miami, Florida, United States	Gamebred FC Lightweight Tournament Round of 16.
Win	28–12–1	Rogerio Ferreira Furtado	Decision (unanimous)	Shooto Brasil 134	December 5, 2025	3	5:00	Rio de Janeiro, Brazil	Return to Lightweight.
Loss	27–12–2	Rustam Asuev	Decision (unanimous)	ACA 188	June 28, 2025	3	5:00	Sochi, Russia	Catchweight (149 lb) bout; Asuev missed weight.
Loss	27–11–2	Khasan Dadalov	Decision (unanimous)	ACA 183	February 8, 2025	3	5:00	Krasnodar, Russia	
Loss	27–10–2	Viskhan Kadirov	Submission (rear-naked choke)	ACA 180	October 4, 2024	2	1:09	Grozny, Russia	
Loss	27–9–2	Nashkho Galaev	Decision (split)	ACA 171	February 25, 2024	3	5:00	Krasnodar, Russia	
Win	27–8–2	Alexander Kovalev	TKO (punches and elbows)	ACA 163	September 22, 2023	3	4:35	Minsk, Belarus	
Win	26–8–2	Akhmadkhan Bokov	Decision (unanimous)	ACA 153	March 9, 2023	3	5:00	Moscow, Russia	Catchweight (149.9 lb) bout; Macapá missed weight.
Win	25–8–2	Mauricio Machado	TKO (punches)	Shooto Brasil 111	October 28, 2022	1	0:36	Rio de Janeiro, Brazil	
Loss	24–8–2	Abdul-Rakhman Dudaev	KO (spinning backfist)	ACA 141	July 22, 2022	1	0:44	Sochi, Russia	Return to Featherweight.
Loss	24–7–2	Timur Nagibin	Decision (unanimous)	RCC 11	May 6, 2022	3	5:00	Yekaterinburg, Russia	Lightweight debut.
Win	24–6–2	Jaciel Lima	TKO (punches)	Shooto Brasil 110	December 18, 2021	1	1:38	Rio de Janeiro, Brazil	Catchweight (152 lb) bout.
Loss	23–6–2	John de Jesus	Decision (split)	Bellator 261	June 25, 2021	3	5:00	Uncasville, Connecticut, United States	
Loss	23–5–2	Mikuru Asakura	Decision (unanimous)	Rizin 20	December 31, 2019	3	5:00	Saitama, Japan	
Win	23–4–2	Ashleigh Grimshaw	TKO (doctor stoppage)	Bellator 226	September 7, 2019	2	5:00	San Jose, California, United States	
Win	22–4–2	Kevin Croom	Decision (unanimous)	Bellator 218	March 22, 2019	3	5:00	Thackerville, Oklahoma, United States	
Loss	21–4–2	A.J. McKee	KO (punch)	Bellator 205	September 21, 2018	1	1:09	Boise, Idaho, United States	
Loss	21–3–2	Pat Curran	Decision (unanimous)	Bellator 184	October 6, 2017	3	5:00	Thackerville, Oklahoma, United States	
Loss	21–2–2	Daniel Weichel	Decision (split)	Bellator 177	April 14, 2017	3	5:00	Budapest, Hungary	
Win	21–1–2	Justin Lawrence	Decision (unanimous)	Bellator 167	December 3, 2016	3	5:00	Thackerville, Oklahoma, United States	
Win	20–1–2	Milson Araujo	Decision (unanimous)	Eco Fight 17	December 5, 2015	3	5:00	Macapá, Brazil	
Win	19–1–2	Gleristone Santos	Decision (split)	Bellator 143	September 25, 2015	3	5:00	Hidalgo, Texas, United States	
Win	18–1–2	Fabrício Guerreiro	Decision (split)	Bellator 136	April 10, 2015	3	5:00	Irvine, California, United States	
Win	17–1–2	Scott Cleve	Decision (split)	Bellator 128	October 10, 2014	3	5:00	Thackerville, Oklahoma, United States	
Win	16–1–2	Oberdan Vieira Tenorio	Submission (rear-naked choke)	Iron Man Vale Tudo 27	March 15, 2014	3	3:20	Macapá, Brazil	
Draw	15–1–2	Rivaldo Junior	Draw (split)	Shooto Brasil 40	June 23, 2013	3	5:00	Manaus, Brazil	
Win	15–1–1	Lucas Caio	TKO (doctor stoppage)	Shooto Brasil 38	April 19, 2013	1	2:58	São Paulo, Brazil	
Win	14–1–1	Francisco Cylderlan Lima da Silva	KO (punch)	MMA Rocks 1	December 8, 2012	1	0:32	São Paulo, Brazil	
Win	13–1–1	Rafael Macedo	TKO (doctor stoppage)	Shooto Brasil 35	October 20, 2012	1	5:00	Rio de Janeiro, Brazil	
Loss	12–1–1	Hugo Viana	Decision (split)	UFC 147	June 23, 2012	3	5:00	Belo Horizonte, Brazil	Catchweight (150 lb) bout; Teixeira missed weight.
Win	12–0–1	Paulo Dinis	Technical Submission (arm-triangle choke)	Amazon Fight 10	December 7, 2011	2	2:10	Belém, Brazil	
Win	11–0–1	Jamil Silveira da Conceicao	Submission (guillotine choke)	Golden Fight 2	October 8, 2011	1	N/A	Macapá, Brazil	
Win	10–0–1	Guilherme Matos Rodrigues	KO (punch)	Amazon Fight 9	September 15, 2011	3	4:01	Belém, Brazil	
Win	9–0–1	Rafael Carvalho	Submission (rear-naked choke)	Iron Man Vale Tudo 20	September 4, 2010	3	3:47	Macapá, Brazil	
Win	8–0–1	Michel Addario Bastos	Decision (unanimous)	Iron Man Championship: Champions	April 19, 2009	3	5:00	Belém, Brazil	
Win	7–0–1	Francisco Carvalho Jr.	Submission (kimura)	Hiro Super Fight 13	March 13, 2009	1	2:10	Belém, Brazil	
Win	6–0–1	Jimmy Lira Nascimento	Submission (kimura)	Gladiador Fight Amapá 1	January 31, 2009	1	2:07	Macapá, Brazil	
Win	5–0–1	Willian Cabocao	Decision (unanimous)	Super Pitbull Fight 6	December 4, 2008	3	5:00	Castanhal, Brazil	
Draw	4–0–1	Rodrigo de Lima	Draw	Arena Fighting Championship 1	September 27, 2008	3	5:00	Macapá, Brazil	
Win	4–0	Alisson Deivid Rodrigues	Submission (armbar)	MMA: Evolution 1	July 5, 2008	3	3:27	Macapá, Brazil	
Win	3–0	Marcio Alex dos Santos Vales	Submission (armbar)	Win Combat Championship 2	September 15, 2007	1	2:03	Macapá, Brazil	
Win	2–0	Alex Pantoja dos Santos	Submission (armbar)	Win Combat Championship 2	September 15, 2007	1	1:59	Macapá, Brazil	
Win	1–0	Marcio Alex dos Santos Vales	Submission (armbar)	Dragon Fight Championship 2	September 12, 2007	3	1:24	Macapá, Brazil	Featherweight debut.

=== Mixed martial arts exhibition record ===
Exhibition record breakdown		
2 matches	1 win	1 loss
By submission	1	0
By decision	0	1

Res.	Record	Opponent	Method	Event	Date	Round	Time	Location	Notes
Loss	1–1	Rodrigo Damm	Decision (split)	The Ultimate Fighter: Brazil	May 13, 2012 (airdate)	3	5:00	São Paulo, Brazil	The Ultimate Fighter: Brazil preliminary round.
Win	1–0	Giovanni Santos	Submission (armbar)	The Ultimate Fighter: Brazil	March 25, 2012 (airdate)	1	0:00	São Paulo, Brazil	The Ultimate Fighter: Brazil elimination round.
