= Ray Sloan =

American mixed martial arts fighter

- Born: July 14, 1985 (age 41)
- Nationality: American
- Height: 6 ft 1 in (1.85 m)
- Weight: 202 lb (92 kg; 14.4 st)
- Division: Light Heavyweight
- Reach: 75.0 in (191 cm)
- Fighting out of: Oceanside, California, United States
- Team: Excel Jiu Jitsu
- Years active: 2013-2015

Mixed martial arts record
- Total: 9
- Wins: 8
- By submission: 6
- By decision: 2
- Losses: 1
- By decision: 1

Other information
- Mixed martial arts record from Sherdog

Ray Sloan (born July 14, 1985) is an American mixed martial artist who last competed in Bellator's Light Heavyweight division.

== Mixed martial arts career ==
=== Early career ===
Debuting in January 2013, Sloan spent his earlier career in the Xplode Fight Series promotion. By March 2014, he had compiled a 6–0 record with the promotion, with most of his victories ending via submission.

=== Bellator MMA ===
Sloan made his Bellator debut against Jamelle Jones at Bellator 121 on June 6, 2014. Sloan won the fight via rear-naked choke submission at 0:48 in the first round.

Sloan faced Nick Moghaddam at Bellator 127 on October 3, 2014. He won the fight via unanimous decision.

== Mixed martial arts record ==
Professional record breakdown
9 matches	8 wins	1 loss
By knockout	0	0
By submission	6	0
By decision	2	1
Draws	0	

Res.	Record	Opponent	Method	Event	Date	Round	Time	Location	Notes
Loss	8–1	Luc Bondale	Decision (unanimous)	Bellator 141	August 28, 2015	3	5:00	Temecula, California, United States	
Win	8–0	Nick Moghaddam	Decision (unanimous)	Bellator 127	October 3, 2014	3	5:00	Temecula, California, United States	
Win	7–0	Jamelle Jones	Submission (rear-naked choke)	Bellator 121	June 6, 2014	1	0:48	Thackerville, Oklahoma, United States	
Win	6–0	Matt Lagler	Decision (unanimous)	Xplode Fight Series: Fire	March 22, 2014	3	5:00	Valley Center, California, United States	
Win	5–0	Mark McCaw	Submission (rear-naked choke)	Xplode Fight Series: Feast or Famine	November 16, 2013	1	1:25	Valley Center, California, United States	
Win	4–0	Josh Gibson	Submission	Xplode Fight Series: Creation	September 21, 2013	1	N/A	Valley Center, California, United States	
Win	3–0	Edward Darby	Submission (armbar)	Xplode Fight Series: Aftermath	July 20, 2013	1	2:11	Valley Center, California, United States	
Win	2–0	Cole Thomas	Submission (guillotine choke)	Xplode Fight Series: Revancha	March 16, 2013	2	2:27	Valley Center, California, United States	
Win	1–0	Pete Munoz	Submission (rear-naked choke)	Xplode Fight Series: Vengeance	January 19, 2013	1	0:46	Valley Center, California, United States	
