= Will Martinez =

American mixed martial arts fighter

- Born: William Martinez Jr. August 31, 1980 (age 46); Philadelphia, Pennsylvania, United States
- Height: 5 ft 9 in (1.75 m)
- Weight: 145 lb (66 kg; 10.4 st)
- Division: Featherweight (145 lb); Lightweight (155 lb)
- Reach: 66.0 in (168 cm)
- Fighting out of: Philadelphia, Pennsylvania, United States
- Team: Team Balance; Martinez BJJ
- Rank: black belt in Brazilian jiu-jitsu under Carlos Machado
- Years active: 2008–2014

Mixed martial arts record
- Total: 14
- Wins: 10
- By knockout: 3
- By submission: 5
- By decision: 2
- Losses: 3
- By submission: 2
- By decision: 1
- Draws: 1

Other information
- Notable relatives: Jesus Martinez, brother
- Mixed martial arts record from Sherdog

Will Martinez (born August 31, 1980) is an American mixed martial artist who competed in Bellator's Featherweight division.

== Background ==
In early 2011, Martinez opened his Brazilian jiu-jitsu, mixed martial arts and Muay Thai school, Martinez Brazilian jiu-jitsu in Philadelphia.

He is also brother of fellow mixed martial artist Jesus Martinez.

== Mixed martial arts career ==
=== Early career ===
Martinez started his professional career in 2009. He fought only for New Jersey and Pennsylvania-based promotions, as Ring of Combat and Locked in the Cage.

In 2012, Martinez signed with Bellator.

=== Bellator MMA ===
Martinez was expected to make his promotional debut against TUF 12 competitor Andy Main on April 13, 2012, at Bellator 65. However, Martinez instead faced Terrell Hobbs at the same event. He won via submission due to a rear-naked choke in the first round.

Martinez faced Casey Johnson on September 28, 2012, at Bellator 74. He won via submission due to a rear-naked choke in the first round.

Martinez was expected to face Michael Phillips on April 4, 2013, at Bellator 95. However, Phillips was replaced by Michael Hess due to undisclosed reasons. He won via ground-and-pound knockout in the first round.

Martinez faced Kevin Roddy on November 15, 2013, at Bellator 108. He won the fight via submission due to a rear-naked choke in round one.

Martinez faced Goiti Yamauchi in the quarterfinal match of Bellator season ten featherweight tournament on February 28, 2014, at Bellator 110. He won the fight via unanimous decision. Martinez faced Desmond Green in the tournament semifinals at Bellator 114 on March 28, 2014. He lost the fight via unanimous decision and later announced his retirement.

== Mixed martial arts record ==
Professional record breakdown
14 matches	10 wins	3 losses
By knockout	3	0
By submission	5	2
By decision	2	1
Draws	1	

Res.	Record	Opponent	Method	Event	Date	Round	Time	Location	Notes
Win	10–3–1	Andres Jeudi	Decision (unanimous)	Matrix Fights 9	December 5, 2014	3	5:00	Philadelphia, Pennsylvania, United States	Lightweight bout.
Loss	9–3–1	Desmond Green	Decision (unanimous)	Bellator 114	March 28, 2014	3	5:00	West Valley City, Utah, United States	Bellator Season 10 Featherweight Tournament Semifinal.
Win	9–2–1	Goiti Yamauchi	Decision (unanimous)	Bellator 110	February 28, 2014	3	5:00	Uncasville, Connecticut, United States	Featherweight Tournament Quarterfinals.
Win	8–2–1	Kevin Roddy	Submission (rear-naked choke)	Bellator 108	November 15, 2013	1	3:50	Atlantic City, New Jersey, United States	
Win	7–2–1	Mervin Rodriguez	Submission (armbar)	Matrix Fights 8	September 20, 2013	1	2:08	Philadelphia, Pennsylvania, United States	150 lb catchweight bout.
Win	6–2–1	Michael Hess	KO (punches)	Bellator 95	April 4, 2013	1	4:15	Atlantic City, New Jersey, United States	
Win	5–2–1	Casey Johnson	Submission (rear-naked choke)	Bellator 74	September 28, 2012	1	2:27	Atlantic City, New Jersey, United States	Moved down to featherweight.
Win	4–2–1	Terrell Hobbs	Submission (rear-naked choke)	Bellator 65	April 13, 2012	1	4:13	Atlantic City, New Jersey, United States	
Win	3–2–1	Vamana Brown	Submission (rear-naked choke)	Xtreme Fight Events: Cage Wars 6	June 10, 2011	1	3:32	Chester, Pennsylvania, United States	
Win	2–2–1	Neil Johnson	KO (punch)	Locked in the Cage 6	December 3, 2010	1	0:35	Philadelphia, Pennsylvania, United States	
Loss	1–2–1	Alexandre Bezerra	Submission (guillotine choke)	Locked in the Cage 4	May 14, 2010	1	1:36	Philadelphia, Pennsylvania, United States	
Win	1–1–1	Mitch Lyons	TKO (punches)	Matrix Fights 1	February 27, 2010	2	3:52	Philadelphia, Pennsylvania, United States	
Loss	0–1–1	Liam Kerrigan	Submission (kneebar)	Ring of Combat 27	November 20, 2009	2	1:07	Atlantic City, New Jersey, United States	
Draw	0–0–1	Al Iaquinta	Draw (unanimous)	Ring of Combat 24	April 17, 2009	3	4:00	Atlantic City, New Jersey, United States	Iaquinta had one point deducted for fence grabbing.
