= 2014 in Bellator MMA =

Mixed martial arts events

Information
- Promotion: Bellator MMA
- First date aired: February 28, 2014
- Last date aired: November 15, 2014

2014 in Bellator MMA was the tenth season for Bellator MMA, a mixed martial arts promotion. It began on February 28, 2014 and aired on Spike TV.

The season included tournaments for the Heavyweight, Welterweight, Featherweight, Light Heavyweight, and Lightweight weight classes. At the end of the season, Bellator held its first pay-per-view event, Bellator 120, on May 17, 2014.

== Bellator 110 ==
Bellator 110
- Date: February 28, 2014
- Venue: Mohegan Sun
- City: Uncasville, Connecticut

Bellator 110 took place on February 28, 2014 at the Mohegan Sun in Uncasville, Connecticut. The event aired live in prime time on Spike TV.

Background

Bellator 110 featured the opening round of the Light Heavyweight and Featherweight tournament.

A bout between Josh Diekmann and Chris Birchler was initially planned for this card, but later cancelled.

Pat Schultz was scheduled to face Dave Roberts in a Light Heavyweight bout on this card. However, on the day of the weigh ins, Roberts came in overweight at 212 pounds and the bout was eventually removed from the card.

Results

Main Card (Spike TV)
Weight Class				Method	Round	Time	Notes
Light Heavyweight	Quinton Jackson	def.	Christian M'Pumbu	KO (punches)	1	4:34	(Note: Light Heavyweight Tournament Semifinals)
Light Heavyweight	Muhammed Lawal	def.	Mikhail Zayats	Decision (unanimous) (30-27, 30-27, 30-27)	3	5:00
Featherweight	Matt Bessette	def.	Diego Nunes	Decision (split) (30-27, 29-28, 28-29)	3	5:00	(Note: Featherweight Tournament Quarterfinals)
Featherweight	Desmond Green	def.	Mike Richman	Decision (unanimous) (30-27, 29-28, 29-28)	3	5:00
Preliminary Card (Spike.com)
Featherweight	Will Martinez	def.	Goiti Yamauchi	Decision (unanimous) (30-27, 30-27, 30-27)	3	5:00
Featherweight	Daniel Weichel	def.	Scott Cleve	Submission (rear naked choke)	1	3:46
Featherweight	Saul Almeida	def.	Andrew Fisher	Decision (unanimous) (29-28, 29-28, 29-28)	3	5:00
Light Heavyweight	Egidijus Valavičius	def.	Atanas Djambazov	KO (knee and punch)	1	0:48
Lightweight	Ryan Quinn	def.	Andrew Calandrelli	Decision (unanimous) (30-27, 29-28, 29-28)	3	5:00
Heavyweight	Manny Lara	vs.	Josh Diekmann	No Contest	1	0:18	(Note: Diekmann inadvertently scratched Lara in the eye.)
Bantamweight	Marvin Maldonado	vs.	Rico Disciullo	No Contest	1	1:53	(Note: DiSciullo threw 2 inadvertent illegal knees while Maldonado was grounded.)

== Bellator 111 ==
Bellator 111
- Date: March 7, 2014
- Venue: WinStar World Casino
- City: Thackerville, Oklahoma

Bellator 111 took place on March 7, 2014 at the WinStar World Casino in Thackerville, Oklahoma. The event aired live in prime time on Spike TV.

Background

Bellator 111 was to feature a Bellator Bantamweight Championship bout between Eduardo Dantas and 2013 Summer Series Tournament winner Rafael Silva. However, Silva was forced to pull out of the bout due to injury, and replaced by Anthony Leone.

The card also featured the opening round of the Heavyweight tournament.

Results

Main Card (Spike TV)
Weight Class				Method	Round	Time	Notes
Bantamweight	Eduardo Dantas (c)	def.	Anthony Leone	Submission (rear naked choke)	2	4:00	(Note: For Bantamweight Championship)
Heavyweight	Lavar Johnson	def.	Ryan Martinez	TKO (punches)	1	4:22	(Note: Heavyweight Tournament Quarterfinals)
Heavyweight	Mighty Mo	def.	Peter Graham	Submission (cobra choke)	3	2:31
Heavyweight	Alexander Volkov	def.	Mark Holata	TKO (punches)	1	1:21
Preliminary Card (Spike.com)
Heavyweight	Blagoy Ivanov	def.	Rich Hale	Decision (unanimous) (29-28, 29-28, 29-28)	3	5:00
Middleweight	Cortez Coleman	def.	Daniel Miller	Submission (verbal submission to punches)	2	4:49
Heavyweight	Javy Ayala	def.	Eric Prindle	TKO (doctor stoppage)	3	2:05
Catchweight (190 lb)	Abdul Razak Alhassan	def.	Matt Jones	TKO (punches)	1	1:23
Lightweight	Brent Primus	def.	Chris Jones	TKO (punches)	1	1:45
Bantamweight	Chris Gutiérrez	def.	Justin McNally	TKO (punches)	1	2:50
Unaired
Featherweight	Stephen Banaszak	def.	Treston Thomison	Submission (armlock)	1	4:56

== Bellator 112 ==
Bellator 112
- Date: March 14, 2014
- Venue: The Horseshoe
- City: Hammond, Indiana

Bellator 112 took place on March 14, 2014 at The Horseshoe in Hammond, Indiana. The event aired live in prime time on Spike TV.

Background

Bellator 112 featured the first Bellator Featherweight Championship title defense for Daniel Straus. He faced former champion Pat Curran in a rematch. This move drew criticism for Bellator from MMA pundits and fans, as many felt that Curran, who had previously lost his last match to Straus and not won a tournament for a rematch, had not done enough to earn a title shot over waiting tournament winners Patrício Pitbull and Magomedrasul Khasbulaev.

The card also featured the opening round of the Welterweight tournament. On March 8, 2014, it was announced that War Machine, Mark Scanlon, and Joe Riggs pulled out of their tournament bouts and were replaced by Paul Bradley, Nathan Coy, and Cristiano Souza.

Results

Main Card (Spike TV)
Weight Class				Method	Round	Time	Notes
Featherweight	Pat Curran	def.	Daniel Straus (c)	Submission (rear-naked choke)	5	4:46	(Note: For Featherweight Championship)
Welterweight	Andrey Koreshkov	def.	Nah-Shon Burrell	TKO (knee and punches)	1	0:41	(Note: Welterweight Tournament Quarterfinals)
Welterweight	Sam Oropeza	def.	Cristiano Souza	TKO (punches)	1	3:07
Welterweight	Adam McDonough	def.	Jesse Juarez	Decision (unanimous) (29-28, 29-28, 29-28)	3	5:00
Preliminary Card (Spike.com)
Welterweight	Nathan Coy	def.	Paul Bradley	Decision (unanimous) (30-27, 30-27, 30-27)	3	5:00
Welterweight	Belal Muhammad	def.	A.J. Matthews	Decision (unanimous) (29-28, 29-28, 29-28)	3	5:00
Featherweight	Darrion Caldwell	def.	Lance Surma	Submission (guillotine choke)	1	0:50
Lightweight	Derek Loffer	def.	Bobby Reardanz	Decision (unanimous) (30-27, 30-27, 30-27)	3	5:00
Catchweight (215 lb)	Anthony Gomez	def.	Jason Guida	Decision (unanimous) (30-26, 30-27, 30-27)	3	5:00
Heavyweight	Daniel James	def.	Erick Correa	Submission (punches)	2	4:30
Unaired
Bantamweight	Diego Marlon	def.	Lloyd Carter	Submission (triangle choke)	2	3:10

== Bellator 113 ==
Bellator 113
- Date: March 21, 2014
- Venue: Kansas Star Arena
- City: Mulvane, Kansas

Bellator 113 took place on March 21, 2014 at the Kansas Star Arena in Mulvane, Kansas. The event aired live in prime time on Spike TV.

Background

Bellator 113 featured a Bellator Light Heavyweight Championship unification bout between champion Attila Vegh and interim champion Emanuel Newton.

The card also featured the opening round of the Lightweight tournament.

UK fighter Terry Etim was forced to withdraw from the Lightweight tournament due to an ACL injury. He was replaced by Tim Welch. Donnie Bell, Welch's previous opponent, instead faced Eric Wisely.

Brian Rogers was scheduled to face Gary Tapusoa in a Middleweight bout. However, Tapusoa was unable to make the weight requirements and the fight was cancelled.

Results

Main Card (Spike TV)
Weight Class				Method	Round	Time	Notes
Light Heavyweight	Emanuel Newton (ic)	def.	Attila Végh (c)	Decision (split) (48-47, 47-48, 49-46)	5	5:00	(Note: Light Heavyweight Championship unification bout)
Lightweight	Patricky Freire	def.	David Rickels	KO (punches)	2	0:54	(Note: Lightweight Tournament Quarterfinals)
Lightweight	Marcin Held	def.	Rodrigo Cavalheiro	Submission (toe hold)	1	1:56
Lightweight	Derek Campos	def.	Tim Welch	Decision (unanimous) (30-27, 30-27, 30-27)	3	5:00
Preliminary Card (Spike.com)
Lightweight	Derek Anderson	def.	Brandon Girtz	KO (knee)	2	0:23
Featherweight	Israel Giron	def.	Cody Carrillo	Decision (unanimous) (29-28, 29-28, 29-28)	3	5:00
Lightweight	Eric Wisely	def.	Donnie Bell	Decision (split) (30-27, 28-29, 29-28)	3	5:00
Heavyweight	Daniel Gallemore	def.	Frederick Brown	TKO (punches)	1	3:34
Catchweight (158 lb)	Bobby Cooper	def.	Márcio Navarro	Decision (unanimous) (30-27, 29-28, 29-28)	3	5:00
Unaired
Bantamweight	LC Davis	def.	Tory Bogguess	Submission (guillotine choke)	1	4:58

== Bellator 114 ==
Bellator 114
- Date: March 28, 2014
- Venue: Maverik Center
- City: West Valley City, Utah

Bellator 114 took place on March 28, 2014 at the Maverik Center in West Valley City, Utah. The event aired live in prime time on Spike TV.

Background

Bellator 114 featured the third Bellator Middleweight Championship title defense for Alexander Shlemenko as he faced Season 9 tournament winner Brennan Ward.

Ron Keslar and Jordan Smith were scheduled to face each other in a welterweight match; however, the bout did not materialize due to undisclosed reasons.

Aaron Wilkinson and Michael Arrant were also scheduled to face each other in a welterweight match, but it was cancelled.

Results

Main Card (Spike TV)
Weight Class				Method	Round	Time	Notes
Middleweight	Alexander Shlemenko (c)	def.	Brennan Ward	Submission (guillotine choke)	2	1:22	(Note: For Middleweight Championship)
Featherweight	Daniel Weichel	def.	Matt Bessette	Decision (unanimous) (29-28, 29-28, 30-27)	3	5:00	(Note: Featherweight Tournament Semifinals)
Featherweight	Desmond Green	def.	Will Martinez	Decision (unanimous) (29-28, 30-27, 30-27)	3	5:00
Middleweight	Brett Cooper	def.	Kendall Grove	KO (punches)	2	3:33	(Note: Middleweight Tournament Semifinals)
Preliminary Card (Spike.com)
Lightweight	Justin Wilcox	def.	Jason Fischer	Decision (unanimous) (29-28, 29-28, 29-28)	3	5:00
Lightweight	Bubba Jenkins	def.	Sean Powers	Decision (unanimous) (30-27, 30-27, 30-27)	3	5:00
Light Heavyweight	Linton Vassell	def.	Trevor Carlson	Submission (rear naked choke)	2	1:54
Welterweight	Gavin Sterritt	def.	Mike Estus	Submission (guillotine choke)	1	3:29
Middleweight	Joe Rodriguez	def.	Eric Wahlin	Submission (arm triangle choke)	2	2:06
Unaired
Featherweight	Rad Martinez	def.	Edson Berto	Decision (unanimous)	3	5:00

== Bellator 115 ==
Bellator 115
- Date: April 4, 2014
- Venue: Reno Events Center
- City: Reno, Nevada

Bellator 115 took place on April 4, 2014 at the Reno Events Center in Reno, Nevada. The event aired live in prime time on Spike TV.

Background

Bellator 115 featured the first Bellator Heavyweight Championship title defense for Vitaly Minakov as he took on Season 9 tournament winner Cheick Kongo.

Doug Marshall was originally announced as one of the participants in the Middleweight tournament. However, he was pulled from the bout due to a current suspension and was replaced by Jeremy Kimball. His opponent Dan Cramer was then scheduled to face Jeremy Kimball in a Middleweight Tournament Semifinal. Kimball, however, missed weight badly and was pulled from the bout.

Andrey Koreshkov and Sam Oropeza were scheduled to meet in the Welterweight Tournament Semifinals on this card. However, on the day of the weigh ins, the bout was cancelled due to Koreshkov having flu-like symptoms.

Additionally, a lightweight bout between Jimmy Jones and Rudy Morales that was scheduled to take place at World Series of Fighting 9 was rescheduled for this card.

Results

Main Card (Spike TV)
Weight Class				Method	Round	Time	Notes
Heavyweight	Vitaly Minakov (c)	def.	Cheick Kongo	Decision (unanimous) (48-46, 48-46, 48-46)	5	5:00	(Note: For Heavyweight Championship.) (Note: Minakov was docked 1 point for kicks to Kongo's groin in round 1.)
Welterweight	Herman Terrado	vs.	Justin Baesman	Majority Draw (29-28, 28-28, 28-28)	3	5:00
Light Heavyweight	Kelly Anundson	def.	Volkan Oezdemir	Submission (cross-face crank)	2	3:19
Catchweight (195 lb)	Mikkel Parlo	def.	Johnny Cisneros	Decision (unanimous) (30-27, 30-27, 30-27)	3	5:00
Preliminary Card (Spike.com)
Lightweight	Rudy Morales	def.	Jimmy Jones	Decision (split) (29-28, 28-29, 29-28)	3	5:00
Welterweight	Rick Reeves	def.	James Terry	Decision (split) (29-28, 28-29, 29-28)	3	5:00
Heavyweight	Freddie Aquitania	def.	Josh Appelt	Decision (unanimous) (29-28, 29-28, 29-28)	3	5:00
Lightweight	Sinjen Smith	def.	Jason Powell	Submission (armbar)	1	1:52
Flyweight	Benito Lopez	def.	Oscar Ramirez	Decision (unanimous) (30-27, 30-27, 29-28)	3	5:00

== Bellator 116 ==
Bellator 116
- Date: April 11, 2014
- Venue: Pechanga Resort & Casino
- City: Temecula, California

Bellator 116 took place on April 11, 2014 at the Pechanga Resort & Casino in Temecula, California. The event aired live in prime time on Spike TV.

Background

Bellator 116 featured the semifinals of the Season 10 Heavyweight Tournament and one of the semifinals for the Middleweight tournament.

The event also featured the final fight for Vladimir Matyushenko, as he retired from MMA after his fight.

Results

Main Card (Spike TV)
Weight Class				Method	Round	Time	Notes
Heavyweight	Blagoy Ivanov	def.	Lavar Johnson	Submission (americana)	1	4:08	(Note: Heavyweight Tournament Semifinals)
Light Heavyweight	Joey Beltran	def.	Vladimir Matyushenko	Submission (north-south choke)	3	3:06	(Note: Vladimir Matyushenko Retirement Fight)
Welterweight	Adam McDonough	def.	Nathan Coy	KO (punches)	2	0:30	(Note: Welterweight Tournament Semifinal)
Heavyweight	Alexander Volkov	def.	Mighty Mo	KO (head kick)	1	2:44
Preliminary Card (Spike.com)
Middleweight	Brandon Halsey	def.	Joe Pacheco	Decision (unanimous) (30-27, 30-27, 30-27)	3	5:00	(Note: Middleweight Tournament Semifinal)
Welterweight	Karo Parisyan	def.	Ron Keslar	KO (punches)	2	4:05
Bantamweight	Rob Emerson	def.	Joe Taimanglo	Decision (unanimous) (29-28, 30-27, 30-27)	3	5:00
Catchweight (180 lb)	Ricky Rainey	def.	Andy Murad	TKO (head kick and punches)	1	1:11
Light Heavyweight	Philipe Lins	def.	Travis Clark	Submission (rear naked choke)	1	0:40
Light Heavyweight	Rodney Wallace	def.	Carlos Eduardo	Decision (unanimous) (29-28, 30-27, 30-27)	3	5:00
Unaired
Middleweight	Dave Vitkay	def.	Keith Berry	Decision (unanimous) (29-28, 29-28, 29-28)	3	5:00
Featherweight	Poppies Martinez	def.	Josh Smith	Submission (guillotine choke)	1	3:50
Featherweight	Brandon Bender	def.	Mario Navarro	Submission (rear-naked choke)	2	4:15

== Bellator 117 ==
Bellator 117
- Date: April 18, 2014
- Venue: Mid-America Center
- City: Council Bluffs, Iowa

Bellator 117 took place on April 18, 2014 at the Mid-American Center in Council Bluffs, Iowa. The event aired live in prime time on Spike TV.

Background

Bellator 117 featured a bout between Douglas Lima and Rick Hawn for the vacant Bellator Welterweight title as well as the semifinals of the Season 10 Lightweight Tournament.

Results

Main Card (Spike TV)
Weight Class				Method	Round	Time	Notes
Welterweight	Douglas Lima	def.	Rick Hawn	TKO (corner stoppage)	2	3:19	(Note: For the vacant Welterweight Championship)
Lightweight	Marcin Held	def.	Derek Anderson	Submission (triangle choke)	2	3:07	(Note: Lightweight Tournament Semifinals)
Welterweight	Karl Amoussou	def.	David Gomez	Decision (split) (28-29, 29-28, 29-28)	3	5:00
Lightweight	Patricky Freire	def.	Derek Campos	TKO (punches)	2	0:52
Preliminary Card (Spike.com)
Lightweight	Martin Brown	def.	Jared Downing	Decision (unanimous) (29-28, 30-27, 30-27)	3	5:00
Lightweight	LaRue Burley	def.	Cliff Wright	Decision (unanimous) (29-27, 29-28, 29-27)	3	5:00
Middleweight	Joe Vedepo	def.	Ben Crowder	TKO (leg injury)	1	0:48
Middleweight	Anthony Smith	def.	Victor Moreno	Submission (triangle choke)	2	0:59
Catchweight (150 lb)	Julio Cesar Neves	def.	Josh Arocho	TKO (elbows)	2	2:37
Lightweight	Jordan Parsons	def.	Tim Bazer	KO (punches)	2	0:04
Unaired
Catchweight (175 lb)	Ryan Jensen	def.	Mark Stoddard	Submission (arm-triangle choke)	1	3:52
Light Heavyweight	Houston Alexander	def.	Matt Uhde	TKO (doctor stoppage)	2	5:00

== Bellator 118 ==
Bellator 118
- Date: May 2, 2014
- Venue: Revel Atlantic City
- City: Atlantic City, New Jersey

Bellator 118 took place on May 2, 2014 in Revel Atlantic City, New Jersey. The event aired live in prime time on Spike TV.

Background

Eduardo Dantas was originally scheduled to defend his Bantamweight title against Joe Warren in the main event. However, on April 26, 2014 it was revealed that Dantas was injured head and withdrew from the fight. Warren was to face Rafael Silva in an Interim Bantamweight title fight. Silva, however, missed weight and the promotion made the interim title available only if Warren were to win.

The Welterweight semifinals bout between Andrey Koreshkov and Sam Oropeza originally set for Bellator 115 was rescheduled to this card. Oropeza was eventually replaced by Justin Baesman.

Results

Main Card (Spike TV)
Weight Class				Method	Round	Time	Notes
Bantamweight	Joe Warren	def.	Rafael Silva	Decision (unanimous) (48-47, 48-47, 48-47)	5	5:00	(Note: For the Bantamweight interim Championship if Warren wins.)
Welterweight	Andrey Koreshkov	def.	Justin Baesman	KO (flying knee)	1	1:41	(Note: Welterweight Tournament Semifinal)
Bantamweight	Marcos Galvao	def.	Thomas Vasquez	Decision (unanimous) (30-27, 30-27, 30-27)	3	5:00
Light Heavyweight	Liam McGeary	def.	Mike Mucitelli	KO (punch)	1	0:22	(Note: Summer Series Light Heavyweight Tournament Quarterfinal)
Preliminary Card (Spike.com)
Catchweight (172 lb)	Dante Rivera	def.	Gemiyale Adkins	Majority decision (29-29, 30-27, 30-27)	3	5:00
Catchweight (187 lb)	Jesus Martinez	def.	Ryan Caltaldi	Decision (unanimous) (30-26, 30-26, 30-26)	3	5:00
Middleweight	Tim Woods	def.	Eugene Fadiora	Decision (unanimous) (29-28, 30-27, 30-27)	3	5:00
Featherweight	Darrion Caldwell	def.	Joe Pingitore	Submission (rear-naked choke)	1	1:32
Featherweight	Lester Caslow	def.	Jay Haas	Submission (guillotine choke)	1	2:29
Lightweight	Sidney Outlaw	def.	Mike Bannon	Decision (unanimous) (29-28, 29-28, 29-28)	3	5:00
Featherweight	Kevin Roddy	def.	Amran Aliyev	Decision (unanimous) (29-28, 29-28, 29-28)	3	5:00

== Bellator 119 ==
Bellator 119
- Date: May 9, 2014
- Venue: Casino Rama
- City: Rama, Ontario, Canada

Bellator 119 took place on May 9, 2014 in Rama, Ontario, Canada . The event aired live in prime time on Spike TV.

Background

Bellator 119 was originally set to feature the Bellator season 10 Heavyweight tournament final. However the Bellator season 10 Featherweight tournament final headlined the card instead.

The Middleweight tournament final of Brett Cooper against Brandon Halsey was originally scheduled for this event, but was cancelled when Cooper injured himself in training.

Fabricio Guerreiro and Shahbulat Shamhalaev were also scheduled to face each other on this event, but that bout was moved to the following week's event.

John Alessio was originally scheduled to face Guillaume DeLorenzi at the event, however, DeLorenzi withdrew from the bout due to injury and was replaced by Eric Wisely.

Results

Main Card (Spike TV)
Weight Class				Method	Round	Time	Notes
Featherweight	Daniel Weichel	def.	Desmond Green	Submission (rear-naked choke)	2	2:07	(Note: Featherweight Tournament finals)
Catchweight (160 lb)	John Alessio	def.	Eric Wisely	Decision (unanimous) (30-27, 30-27, 30-27)	3	5:00
Welterweight	Marius Zaromskis	def.	Vaughn Anderson	Decision (unanimous) (29-28, 30-27, 30-27)	3	5:00
Heavyweight	Raphael Butler	vs.	Nick Rossborough	Majority Draw (28-27, 28-28, 28-28)	3	5:00	(Note: Butler was docked one point in the first round for an illegal headbutt.)
Preliminary Card (Spike.com)
Middleweight	Brian Rogers	def.	Adrian Miles	KO (flying knee)	2	1:29
Catchweight (159 lb)	Jason Meisel	def.	Remy Bussieres	Decision (unanimous) (29-28, 30-27, 30-27)	3	5:00
Catchweight (130 lb)	Malcolm Gordon	def.	Chris Kelades	Decision (unanimous) (29-28, 30-27, 29-28)	3	5:00
Catchweight (160 lb)	Behrang Yousefi	def.	Chad Freeman	Submission (triangle choke)	1	2:47
Unaired
Heavyweight	Stuart Austin	def.	Craig Hudson	Submission (rear-naked choke)	1	4:56
Featherweight	Marlon Sandro	def.	Chris Horodecki	Decision (unanimous) (29-28, 30-27, 30-27)	3	5:00

== Bellator 120 ==
Bellator 120
- Date: May 17, 2014
- Venue: Landers Center
- City: Southaven, Mississippi
- Attendance: 8,115
- Total gate: 578,684
- Buyrate: 100,000

Bellator 120 took place on May 17, 2014.

Background

The event served as Bellator MMA's inaugural pay-per-view event.

Bellator 120 was expected to be headlined by Eddie Alvarez defending his Bellator Lightweight Championship against the former champion Michael Chandler in a trilogy fight. However, a week before the fight, it was announced that Alvarez had suffered a concussion and was forced to pull out of the fight. Chandler instead faced Will Brooks for the Interim Lightweight title.

Tito Ortiz made his Bellator MMA debut at this event against Bellator Middleweight Champion Alexander Shlemenko in a Light Heavyweight bout.

The Season 10 Lightweight tournament final between Patricky Freire and Marcin Held was originally scheduled to take place on the Spike TV portion of this event. However, Freire was injured and the bout was pushed back to another card.

Results

Main Card (PPV)
Weight Class				Method	Round	Time	Notes
Light Heavyweight	Quinton Jackson	def.	Muhammed Lawal	Decision (unanimous) (29-28, 29-28, 29-28)	3	5:00	(Note: Light Heavyweight Tournament Final)
Lightweight	Will Brooks	def.	Michael Chandler	Decision (split) (47-48, 48-47, 48-46)	5	5:00	(Note: Interim Lightweight Championship bout)
Light Heavyweight	Tito Ortiz	def.	Alexander Shlemenko	Technical submission (arm-triangle choke)	1	2:27
Heavyweight	Alexander Volkov	def.	Blagoy Ivanov	Submission (rear-naked choke)	2	1:08	(Note: Heavyweight Tournament finals)
Welterweight	Michael Page	def.	Ricky Rainey	TKO (punch)	1	4:29
Preliminary Card (Spike TV)
Heavyweight	Cheick Kongo	def.	Eric Smith	TKO (knees & punches)	2	4:35
Catchweight (158 lb)	Marcin Held	def.	Nate Jolly	Submission (armbar)	1	4:20
Lightweight	Fabricio Guerreiro	def.	Shahbulat Shamhalaev	Submission (kimura)	1	3:29
Featherweight	Goiti Yamauchi	def.	Mike Richman	Decision (unanimous) (29-28, 29-28, 29-28)	3	5:00
Preliminary Card (Spike.com)
Catchweight (153 lb)	Austin Lyons	def.	Zach Underwood	Technical decision (30-27, 29-28, 30-27)	3	3:25	(Note: Fight ended in the third round when Lyons threw an illegal knee and went to the judges' scorecards.)
Heavyweight	Mike Wessel	def.	Justin Frazier	TKO (punches)	1	4:28
Welterweight	Ben Brewer	def.	Andy Uhrich	KO (punches)	2	2:40
Unaired
Welterweight	Codie Shuffield	def.	Anthony Lemon	Submission (rear-naked choke)	2	2:15
Bantamweight	Brian Hall	def.	Cortez Phelia	TKO (punches)	3	0:24

== Tournaments ==
=== Heavyweight tournament bracket ===
Quarterfinals
(Russia) Alexander Volkov	TKO
(United States) Mark Holata	1
(United States) Mighty Mo	SUB
(Australia) Peter Graham	3
(Bulgaria) Blagoy Ivanov	UD
(United States) Rich Hale	3
(United States) Lavar Johnson	TKO
(United States) Ryan Martinez	1

Semifinals
(Russia) Alexander Volkov	KO
(United States) Mighty Mo	1
(Bulgaria) Blagoy Ivanov	SUB
(United States) Lavar Johnson	1

Finals
(Russia) Alexander Volkov	SUB
(Bulgaria) Blagoy Ivanov	2

=== Light Heavyweight tournament bracket ===
Semifinals
(United States) Quinton Jackson	KO
(Democratic Republic of the Congo) Christian M'Pumbu	1
(United States) Muhammed Lawal	UD
(Russia) Mikhail Zayats	3

Finals
(United States) Quinton Jackson	UD
(United States) Muhammed Lawal	3

=== Middleweight tournament bracket ===
Semifinals
(United States) Brandon Halsey*	UD
(United States) Joe Pacheco*	3
(United States) Brett Cooper	KO
(United States) Kendall Grove	2

Finals
(United States) Brandon Halsey	SUB
(United States) Brett Cooper	1

(*) Replaced Jeremy Kimball vs. Dan Cramer

=== Welterweight tournament bracket ===
Quarterfinals
(Russia) Andrey Koreshkov	TKO
(United States) Nah-Shon Burrell	1
(United States) Sam Oropeza	TKO
(Brazil) Cristiano Souza	1
(United States) Adam McDonough	UD
(United States) Jesse Juarez	3
(United States) Nathan Coy	UD
(United States) Paul Bradley	3

Semifinals
(Russia) Andrey Koreshkov	KO
(United States) Justin Baesman*	1
(United States) Adam McDonough	KO
(United States) Nathan Coy	2

Finals
(Russia) Andrey Koreshkov	UD
(United States) Adam McDonough	3

(*) Replaced Oropeza

=== Lightweight tournament bracket ===
Quarterfinals
(Poland) Marcin Held	SUB
(Brazil) Rodrigo Cavalheiro	1
(United States) Derek Anderson	KO
(United States) Brandon Girtz	2
(Brazil) Patricky Freire	KO
(United States) David Rickels	2
(United States) Derek Campos	UD
(United States) Tim Welch	3

Semifinals
(Poland) Marcin Held	SUB
(United States) Derek Anderson	2
(Brazil) Patricky Freire	TKO
(United States) Derek Campos	2

Finals
(Poland) Marcin Held	UD
(Brazil) Patricky Freire	3

=== Featherweight tournament bracket ===
Quarterfinals
(Germany) Daniel Weichel	SUB
(United States) Scott Cleve	1
(United States) Matt Bessette	SD
(Brazil) Diego Nunes	3
(United States) Desmond Green	UD
(United States) Mike Richman	3
(United States) Will Martinez	UD
(Japan) Goiti Yamauchi	3

Semifinals
(Germany) Daniel Weichel	UD
(United States) Matt Bessette	3
(United States) Desmond Green	UD
(United States) Will Martinez	3

Finals
(Germany) Daniel Weichel	SUB
(United States) Desmond Green	2

== Bellator 121 ==
Bellator 121: Lins vs Heidlage
- Date: June 6, 2014
- Venue: WinStar World Casino
- City: Thackerville, Oklahoma
- Attendance: 1,100

Bellator 121 took place on June 6, 2014 at the WinStar World Casino in Thackerville, Oklahoma. The event aired live in prime time on Spike TV.

Background

Bellator 121 was to feature the rematch between Pat Curran and Patricio Freire for Bellator Featherweight Championship. However, on May 21, it was announced that Curran had pulled out of the bout due to a calf injury.

Results

Main Card (Spike TV)
Weight Class				Method	Round	Time	Notes
Light Heavyweight	Philipe Lins	def.	James Austen Heidlage	Submission (rear-naked choke)	1	2:45	(Note: Light Heavyweight Tournament quarterfinal)
Heavyweight	James Thompson	def.	Eric Prindle	TKO (punches)	1	1:55
Light Heavyweight	Rameau Thierry Sokoudjou	def.	Terry Davinney	Submission (rear-naked choke)	1	4:16
Light Heavyweight	Egidijus Valavicius	def.	Carlos Eduardo	Decision (split) (29-28, 28-29, 29-28)	3	5:00
Preliminary Card (Spike.com)
Middleweight	Joe Vedepo	def.	Cortez Coleman	Decision (majority) (28-28, 29-27, 29-27)	3	5:00	(Note: One point deducted from Coleman in round three due to an illegal knee.)
Light Heavyweight	Kelly Anundson	def.	Rodney Wallace	Decision (unanimous) (29-28, 30-27, 30-27)	3	5:00
Light Heavyweight	Ray Sloan	def.	Jamelle Jones	Submission (rear-naked choke)	1	0:48
Catchweight (190 lb)	Bubba McDaniel	def.	Matt Jones	Decision (unanimous) (30-26, 30-27, 30-27)	3	5:00
Catchweight (140 lb)	Steve Garcia	def.	Cody Walker	KO (punch)	1	0:39
Welterweight	William Florentino	def.	Guillermo Ayme	Decision (split) (28-29, 30-27, 29-28)	3	5:00
Preliminary Card (Unaired)
Featherweight	Treston Thomison	def.	Stephen Banaszak	Submission (guillotine choke)	1	N/A

== Bellator 122 ==
Bellator 122: Koreshkov vs McDonough
- Date: July 25, 2014
- Venue: Pechanga Resort & Casino
- City: Temecula, California
- Attendance: 1,150

Bellator 122 took place on July 25, 2014 at the Pechanga Resort & Casino in Temecula, California. The event aired live in prime time on Spike TV.

Background

Bellator 122 featured the Season 10 Middleweight and Welterweight Tournament Finals. A Heavyweight bout between Dmitrity Sosnovskiy and Manny Lara was cancelled due to an illness of Manny Lara.

This was also the first show under the management of new President Scott Coker.

Results

Main Card (Spike TV)
Weight Class				Method	Round	Time	Notes
Welterweight	Andrey Koreshkov	def.	Adam McDonough	Decision (unanimous) (30-27, 30-27, 30-27)	3	5:00	(Note: Welterweight Tournament final)
Middleweight	Brandon Halsey	def.	Brett Cooper	Submission (armbar)	1	2:09	(Note: Middleweight Tournament final)
Light Heavyweight	Liam McGeary	def.	Egidijus Valavicius	TKO (knees and punches)	1	2:10	(Note: Light Heavyweight Tournament semifinal)
Welterweight	Karo Parisyan	def.	Phil Baroni	TKO (punches)	1	2:06
Preliminary Card (Spike.com)
Heavyweight	Augusto Sakai	def.	Matt Frembling	TKO (knee and punches)	3	3:32
Lightweight	Bubba Jenkins	def.	Poppies Martinez	TKO (punches)	1	4:10
Light Heavyweight	Kelly Anundson	def.	Philipe Lins	TKO (knee injury)	1	1:40
Welterweight	Fernando Gonzalez	def.	Karl Amoussou	Decision (unanimous) (29-28, 29-28, 29-28)	3	5:00
Lightweight	Saad Awad	def.	Joe Duarte	TKO (elbows)	1	1:18
Lightweight	Sergio Rios	def.	Stephen Martinez	TKO (front kick & punches)	2	0:20
Unaired
Light Heavyweight	Linton Vassell	def.	Virgil Zwicker	Submission (rear naked choke)	1	1:07

== Tournaments ==
=== Light Heavyweight tournament bracket ===
Quarterfinals
(England) Liam McGeary	KO
(United States) Mike Mucitelli	1
(Lithuania) Egidijus Valavicius	SD
(Brazil) Carlos Eduardo	3
(United States) Kelly Anundson	UD
(United States) Rodney Wallace	3
(Brazil) Philipe Lins	SUB
(United States) James Austen Heidlage	1

Semifinals
(England) Liam McGeary	TKO
(Lithuania) Egidijus Valavicius	1
(United States) Kelly Anundson	TKO
(Brazil) Philipe Lins	1

Finals
(England) Liam McGeary	SUB
(United States) Kelly Anundson	1

== Bellator 123 ==
Bellator 123: Curran vs. Pitbull 2
- Date: September 5, 2014
- Venue: Mohegan Sun Arena
- City: Uncasville, Connecticut
- Attendance: 7,109
- Total gate: $302,010

Bellator 123 took place on September 5, 2014 at the Mohegan Sun Arena in Uncasville, Connecticut. The event aired live in prime time on Spike TV.

Background

A Bellator Featherweight World Championship rematch between current champion Pat Curran and Patricio Pitbull headlined the event. The two originally met in a closely contested fight at Bellator 85 on January 17, 2013, with Curran winning the bout via split decision. The rematch was initially scheduled to take place at Bellator 121, however, it was announced on May 21, 2014 that Curran had pulled out of the bout due to a calf injury.

This event marked the first time Bellator MMA and their rival the Ultimate Fighting Championship have had live shows go against each other. Additionally, both were held in the same state in venues located within miles of each other.

Former Strikforce Light Heavyweight Champion Muhammed Lawal was originally scheduled to face Tom DeBlass. However, on August 11, it was revealed DeBlass suffered a knee injury and was replaced by Marcus Sursa. In turn, Sursa was also injured and was replaced by Dustin Jacoby.

Results

Fight card
Weight class				Method	Round	Time	Notes
Featherweight	Patrício Pitbull	def.	Pat Curran (c)	Decision (unanimous) (48-47, 49-46, 49-46)	5	5:00	(Note: For the Bellator Featherweight World Championship.)
Light Heavyweight	Muhammed Lawal	def.	Dustin Jacoby	TKO (punches)	2	1:13
Middleweight	Tamdan McCrory	def.	Brennan Ward	KO (punches)	1	0:21
Heavyweight	Bobby Lashley	def.	Josh Burns	Submission (rear-naked choke)	2	3:54
Heavyweight	Cheick Kongo	def.	Lavar Johnson	Submission (rear-naked choke)	1	3:27
Preliminary Card (Spike.com)
Middleweight	Dan Cramer	def.	Perry Filkins	Decision (unanimous) (29-28, 30-27, 30-27)	3	5:00
Featherweight	Scott Cleve	def.	Matt Bessette	Decision (unanimous) (30-27, 29-28, 29-28)	3	5:00
Heavyweight	Josh Diekmann	def.	Mike Wessel	KO (punches)	1	0:47
Bantamweight	Steve Garcia	def.	Kin Moy	Decision (split) (30-27, 29-28, 28-29)	3	5:00
Bantamweight	Rico Disciullo	def.	Marvin Maldonado	Decision (unanimous) (30-27, 30-27, 30-27)	3	5:00
Unaired
Light Heavyweight	Mike Mucitelli	def.	Mark Griffin	Submission (armbar)	1	0:37
Featherweight	Pete Rogers Jr.	def.	Phillipe Martins	KO (punches)	1	0:11
Bantamweight	Blair Tugman	def.	Brandon Fleming	Decision (unanimous)	3	5:00

== Bellator 124 ==
Bellator 124: Newton vs. Beltran
- Date: September 12, 2014
- Venue: Compuware Arena
- City: Plymouth Township, Michigan
- Attendance: 2,468

Bellator 124 took place on September 12, 2014 at the Compuware Arena in Plymouth Township, Michigan. The event aired live in prime time on Spike TV.

Background

Bellator 124 was headlined by a Light Heavyweight Championship match between champion Emanuel Newton and Joey Beltran.

The event also featured the Bellator 2014 Light Heavyweight Tournament Final between Liam McGeary and Kelly Anundson in the co-main event, to determine the next title challenger.

Results

Fight card
Weight class				Method	Round	Time	Notes
Light Heavyweight	Emanuel Newton (c)	def.	Joey Beltran	KO (spinning back fist)	3	3:07	(Note: For the Bellator Light Heavyweight Championship)
Light Heavyweight	Liam McGeary	def.	Kelly Anundson	Submission (inverted triangle choke)	1	4:47	(Note: Bellator Light Heavyweight Tournament Final)
Bantamweight	L.C. Davis	def.	Zeilton Rodrigues	Decision (unanimous) (30-27, 30-27, 30-27)	3	5:00
Catchweight (159 lb)	Ryan Couture	def.	Tom Bagnasco	Submission (rear-naked choke)	1	3:01
Preliminary Card (Spike.com)
Lightweight	Adrian Hadribeaj	def.	Michael Hamida	Decision (split) (29-28, 28-29, 29-28)	3	5:00
Welterweight	Sabah Homasi	def.	Eric Moon	Submission (guillotine choke)	2	1:07
Bantamweight	Michael Hernandez	def.	Thomas Vasquez	Decision (unanimous) (30-27, 29-28, 29-28)	3	5:00
Heavyweight	LeRoy Johnson	def.	Adrian Henderson	Decision (split) (28-29, 29-28, 29-28)	3	5:00
Lightweight	Jason Fischer	def.	Tony Hervey	Decision (unanimous) (30-26, 30-26, 30-26)	3	5:00
Bantamweight	Eric Ramirez	def.	Cortez Phelia	Submission (guillotine choke)	3	0:38
Unaired
Middleweight	Ben Reiter	def.	Shamir Garcia	Decision (unanimous)	3	5:00
Lightweight	Justin Jaynes	def.	Ruben Baraiac	TKO (punches)	1	4:17

== Bellator 125 ==
Bellator 125: Marshall vs. Manhoef
- Date: September 19, 2014
- Venue: Save Mart Center
- City: Fresno, California
- Attendance: 5,000

Bellator 125 took place on September 19, 2014 at the Save Mart Center in Fresno, California. The event aired live in prime time on Spike TV.

Background

Bellator 125 was headlined by a Middleweight match between former kickboxing champion and Bellator newcomer Melvin Manhoef facing former Bellator tournament winner, and former WEC champion, Doug Marshall.

Four time Bellator tournament veteran Brian Rogers was originally scheduled to face former WEC champion James Irvin in the co-main event of this card. However, on September 1, it was revealed that Irvin was injured and Rogers would instead face season eight tournament finalist Brett Cooper. Then, on September 9, it was announced that Cooper would have to pull out of the match due to a back injury; Rogers instead faced promotional newcomer Rafael Carvalho.

Results

Fight card
Weight class				Method	Round	Time	Notes
Middleweight	Melvin Manhoef	def.	Doug Marshall	KO (punch)	1	1:45
Middleweight	Rafael Carvalho	def.	Brian Rogers	TKO (punches)	1	3:06
Heavyweight	Javy Ayala	def.	Raphael Butler	Submission (rear-naked choke)	1	1:03
Catchweight (148 lb)	Goiti Yamauchi	def.	Martin Stapleton	Submission (rear-naked choke)	1	4:37
Preliminary Card (Spike.com)
Featherweight	Joe Neal	def.	Paul Ruiz	Decision (unanimous) (30-27, 30-27, 30-27)	3	5:00
Flyweight	Matt Ramirez	def.	Oscar Ramirez	Submission (armbar)	1	0:42
Welterweight	Chris Honeycutt	def.	Aaron Wilkinson	TKO (punches)	2	4:45
Featherweight	Julio Cesar Neves	def.	Poppies Martinez	TKO (punches)	1	2:16
Featherweight	Jonny Bonilla-Bowman	def.	Art Becerra	Decision (split) (28-29, 29-28, 29-28)	3	5:00
Welterweight	Jesse Juarez	def.	Ron Keslar	Decision (unanimous) (29-28, 29-28, 29-28)	3	5:00
Middleweight	George Zuniga	def.	Granson Clark	TKO (punches)	1	0:34
Unaired
Middleweight	Nate James	def.	Anthony Ruiz	Decision (split)	3	5:00

== Bellator 126 ==
Bellator 126: Shlemenko vs. Halsey
- Date: September 26, 2014
- Venue: Grand Canyon University Arena
- City: Phoenix, Arizona
- Attendance: 6,300

Bellator 126 took place on September 26, 2014 at the Grand Canyon University Arena in Phoenix, Arizona. The event aired live in prime time on Spike TV.

Background

Bellator 126 was headlined by a Middleweight Championship bout between champion Alexander Shlemenko and Season 10 Middleweight Tournament winner Brandon Halsey.

The card also featured the final bout of the Season 10 Lightweight Tournament between Patricky Freire and Marcin Held.

Results

Fight card
Weight class				Method	Round	Time	Notes
Middleweight	Brandon Halsey	def.	Alexander Shlemenko (c)	Technical submission (rear-naked choke)	1	0:35	(Note: For the Bellator Middleweight Championship)
Lightweight	Marcin Held	def.	Patricky Freire	Decision (unanimous) (29-28, 30-27, 30-26)	3	5:00	(Note: Bellator Lightweight Tournament Final)
Featherweight	Bubba Jenkins	def.	Thiago Meller	Decision (unanimous) (29-28, 30-27, 30-27)	3	5:00
Bantamweight	Mike Richman	def.	Ed West	KO (punches)	1	2:44
Preliminary Card (Spike.com)
Catchweight (160 lb)	LaRue Burley	def.	Raymond Pina	Submission (guillotine choke)	2	0:22
Middleweight	Clifford Starks	def.	Kobe Ortiz	Technical submission (guillotine choke)	2	0:52
Heavyweight	Nick Rossborough	def.	Ryan Martinez	TKO (injury)	1	5:00	(Note: Doctor stopped the fight between rounds due to Martinez's torn bicep.)
Bantamweight	Joe Taimanglo	def.	Michael Parker	Decision (unanimous) (30-26, 30-27, 30-27)	3	5:00
Heavyweight	Dan Charles	def.	Stuart Austin	KO (punch)	3	0:18
Lightweight	Derek Campos	def.	Estevan Payan	KO (punch)	1	0:31
Lightweight	Brandon Girtz	def.	Benny Madrid	TKO (punches)	1	0:57

== Bellator 127 ==
Bellator 127: Straus vs. Wilcox
- Date: October 3, 2014
- Venue: Pechanga Resort & Casino
- City: Temecula, California
- Attendance: 1,200

Bellator 127 took place on October 3, 2014 at the Pechanga Resort & Casino in Temecula, California. The event aired live in prime time on Spike TV.

Background

The event was headlined by featherweight match between former Bellator Featherweight Champion Daniel Mason-Straus and season nine tournament finalist Justin Wilcox.

The co-main event was supposed to feature a Welterweight bout between former Dream welterweight champion Marius Zaromskis and former WEC champion Karo Parisyan. However, on September 24 it was announced that Fernando Gonzalez replaced Marius Zaromskis due to an undisclosed injury. Fernando's original opponent Justin Baesman faced newcomer John Mercurio.

Results

Fight card
Weight class				Method	Round	Time	Notes
Featherweight	Daniel Mason-Straus	def.	Justin Wilcox	KO (punches)	1	0:50
Catchweight (173 lb)	Fernando Gonzalez	def.	Karo Parisyan	TKO (punches)	1	1:43
Catchweight (138 lb)	Rafael Silva	def.	Rob Emerson	Decision (unanimous) (30-27, 29-28, 29-28)	3	5:00
Middleweight	Kendall Grove	def.	Christian M'Pumbu	Submission (rear-naked choke)	2	4:14
Preliminary Card (Spike.com)
Light Heavyweight	Ray Sloan	def.	Nick Moghaddam	Decision (unanimous) (30-27, 30-27, 30-27)	3	5:00
Lightweight	Saad Awad	def.	Sergio Rios	Decision (unanimous) (30-26, 30-27, 30-27)	3	5:00
Middleweight	Keith Berry	vs.	Joe Pacheco	No Contest	3	5:00	(Note: Originally a split decision win for Berry; overturned after failing a drug test.)
Light Heavyweight	Rameau Thierry Sokoudjou	def.	Malik Merad	TKO (elbows)	2	4:04
Catchweight (177 lb)	Ricky Rainey	def.	Johnny Cisneros	TKO (knee & strikes)	1	3:18
Welterweight	Justin Baesman	def.	John Mercurio	Decision (split) (28-29, 29-28, 29-28)	3	5:00
Unaired
Bantamweight	Shawn Bunch	def.	David Duran	TKO (strikes)	1

== Bellator 128 ==
Bellator 128: Dantas vs. Warren
- Date: October 10, 2014
- Venue: Winstar World Casino
- City: Thackerville, Oklahoma
- Attendance: 1,325

Bellator 128 took place on October 10, 2014 at the Winstar World Casino in Thackerville, Oklahoma. The event aired live in prime time on Spike TV.

Background

Bellator 128 was headlined by a Bellator Bantamweight Championship fight between champion Eduardo Dantas and interim champion Joe Warren.

A Lightweight contest between Alexander Sarnavskiy and John Gunderson was scheduled to take place on this card. However, due to Gunderson pulling out of the bout and retiring, Derek Campos stepped in as a replacement. Campos suffered an injury and was forced out of the fight, Sarnavskiy faced promotional newcomer Dakota Cochrane.

Results

Fight card
Weight class				Method	Round	Time	Notes
Bantamweight	Joe Warren (ic)	def.	Eduardo Dantas (c)	Decision (unanimous) (48-47, 48-47, 48-47)	5	5:00	(Note: For the Bellator Bantamweight Championship)
Welterweight	Michael Page	def.	Nah-Shon Burrell	Decision (unanimous) (30-27, 30-27, 30-27)	3	5:00
Catchweight (160 lb)	Alexander Sarnavskiy	def.	Dakota Cochrane	Submission (rear-naked choke)	1	2:32
Middleweight	Emiliano Sordi	def.	Bubba McDaniel	Submission (guillotine choke)	1	0:58
Preliminary Card (Spike.com)
Welterweight	Cortez Coleman	def.	William Florentino	Decision (unanimous)	3	5:00
Middleweight	Jason Butcher	def.	Andreas Michailidis	TKO (punches)	2	0:28	(Note: This fight aired on Spike TV after Alexander Sarnavskiy vs. Dakota Cochrane.)
Featherweight	Emmanuel Sanchez	def.	Stephen Banaszak	Submission (rear-naked choke)	1	2:18	(Note: This fight aired on Spike TV after Michael Page vs. Nah-Shon Burrell.)
Featherweight	John Teixeira	def.	Scott Cleve	Decision (split)	3	5:00
Lightweight	J.C. Cottrell	def.	Jonathan Gary	Submission (guillotine choke)	2	3:30
Catchweight (129 lb)	Brenden Seyler	def.	Demario Cade	Submission (rear-naked choke)	1	1:25
Unaired
Featherweight	Cody Walker	def.	Treston Thomison	KO (head kick)	2	4:59
Lightweight	Jason Sampson	def.	Danny Sykora	Decision (unanimous)	3	5:00

== Bellator 129 ==
Bellator 129: Neer vs. Bradley
- Date: October 17, 2014
- Venue: Mid-America Center
- City: Council Bluffs, Iowa
- Attendance: 3,951

Bellator 129 took place on October 17, 2014 at the Mid-America Center in Council Bluffs, Iowa. The event aired live in prime time on Spike TV.

Background

Bellator 129 was headlined by a Welterweight fight between Iowa natives and UFC Vets Josh Neer and Paul Bradley.

In the co-main event Houston Alexander was expected to face Pride FC vet James Thompson in a Heavyweight bout. However, on October 10, 2014, it was announced that Thompson was pulled from the fight due to injury. Alexander instead faced Virgil Zwicker.

Results

Fight card
Weight class				Method	Round	Time	Notes
Welterweight	Paul Bradley	def.	Josh Neer	Decision (unanimous) (30-27, 30-27, 30-27)	3	5:00
Catchweight (215 lb)	Houston Alexander	vs.	Virgil Zwicker	Draw (majority) (29-28, 28-28, 28-28)	3	5:00	(Note: Alexander was docked a point in the third round for a head-butt.)
Welterweight	André Santos	def.	James Terry	Decision (unanimous) (30-27, 30-27, 30-27)	3	5:00
Middleweight	Joe Vedepo	def.	Davin Clark	TKO (punches)	3	2:27
Preliminary Card (Spike.com)
Catchweight (139 lb)	John DeVall	def.	Chris Lane	Submission (triangle choke)	1	4:40
Catchweight (150 lb)	Eric Howser	def.	Tim Bazer	TKO (elbows)	1	4:11
Catchweight (150 lb)	Martin Brown	def.	Bryan Corley	KO (punches)	2	0:42
Catchweight (168 lb)	Jozette Cotton	def.	Holly Lawson	Decision (unanimous)	3	5:00
Middleweight	Anthony Smith	def.	Brian Green	Decision (unanimous)	3	5:00
Catchweight (178 lb)	Victor Moreno	def.	Marcos Marquez	Decision (unanimous)	3	5:00
Catchweight (158 lb)	Michael McBride	def.	Kevin Morris	Submission (rear-naked choke)	1	4:32

== Bellator 2014 Monster Energy Cup ==
Bellator 2014 Monster Energy Cup
- Date: October 18, 2014
- Venue: Sam Boyd Stadium
- City: Whitney, Nevada

The Bellator 2014 Monster Energy Cup took place on October 18, 2014 at the Sam Boyd Stadium in Whitney, Nevada.

Background

On October 15, 2014, Bellator announced that during the Monster Energy Cup series three fights will take place during the "Party in the Pits" pre-race festivities.

Results

Fight card
Weight class				Method	Round	Time	Notes
Heavyweight	Dan Charles	def.	James Wilson	Decision (unanimous) (29-28, 29-28, 29-28)	3	5:00
Lightweight	Adrian Hadribeaj	def.	A.J. Williams	Decision (split) (28-29, 29-28, 29-28)	3	5:00
Bantamweight	Gustavo Lopez	def.	Sean Cantor	Submission (rear naked choke)	1	4:39

== Bellator 130 ==
Bellator 130: Newton vs. Vassell
- Date: October 24, 2014
- Venue: Kansas Star Arena
- City: Mulvane, Kansas
- Attendance: 2,700

Bellator 130: Newton vs. Vassel took place on October 24, 2014 at the Kansas Star Arena in Mulvane, Kansas. The event aired live in prime time on Spike TV.

Background

Bellator 130 was headlined by a Light Heavyweight Championship fight between Emanuel Newton and Linton Vassell.

Results

Fight card
Weight class				Method	Round	Time	Notes
Light Heavyweight	Emanuel Newton (c)	def.	Linton Vassell	Submission (rear-naked choke)	5	0:47	(Note: For the Bellator Light Heavyweight Championship)
Heavyweight	Bobby Lashley	def.	Karl Etherington	Submission (punches)	1	1:31
Women's Featherweight	Marloes Coenen	def.	Annalisa Bucci	Submission (rear-naked choke)	3	0:57
Lightweight	Dave Jansen	def.	Rick Hawn	Decision (unanimous) (29-28, 30-27, 30-27)	3	5:00
Preliminary Card (Spike.com)
Lightweight	David Rickels	def.	Davi Ramos	Decision (unanimous) (29-28, 29-28, 29-28)	3	5:00
Featherweight	Ricky Musgrave	def.	Joe Wilk	TKO (punches & elbows)	1	2:45
Featherweight	Marcio Navarro	def.	Cody Carrillo	Submission (punches)	3	2:09
Heavyweight	Daniel Gallemore	def.	Gzim Selmani	TKO (punches)	2	4:33
Middleweight	Sam Oropeza	def.	Gary Tapusoa	TKO (punches)	1	2:31
Featherweight	Darrion Caldwell	def.	Anthony Dizy	Decision (unanimous) (30-27, 30-27, 30-27)	3	5:00
Catchweight (159 lb)	Aaron Derrow	def.	Nate Jolly	Decision (unanimous) (29-28, 29-28, 29-28)	3	5:00
Heavyweight	Alex Huddleston	def.	Derek Bohi	TKO (punches)	1	4:04

== Bellator 131 ==
Bellator 131: Ortiz vs. Bonnar
- Date: November 15, 2014
- Venue: Valley View Casino Center
- City: San Diego, California
- Attendance: 8,243
- Total gate: $407,259

Bellator 131 took place on November 15, 2014 at the Valley View Casino Center in San Diego, California. The event aired live in prime time on Spike TV.

Background

The event was announced during the Bellator Season 11 debut on September 5, 2014. It served as the season finale.

Bellator President Scott Coker announced the main event would feature a grudge match between two former top UFC light heavyweights with Tito Ortiz taking on the newly signed Stephan Bonnar.

Additionally, it was announced that the co-main event would be a rematch between current interim lightweight champion Will Brooks and former undisputed champion Michael Chandler, for the vacant world title.

Muhammed Lawal was originally scheduled to face Tom DeBlass on this card. However, on November 1, it was announced that DeBlass had suffered a cut during training and had to withdraw from the bout. Lawal instead faced Joe Vedepo.

This event was the highest rated in Bellator's history, garnering an average viewership of 1.2 million television viewers in the U.S. with a peak of over 2 million viewers in the main event.

Results

Main card
Weight class				Method	Round	Time	Notes
Light Heavyweight	Tito Ortiz	def.	Stephan Bonnar	Decision (split) (30-27, 28-29, 30-27)	3	5:00
Lightweight	Will Brooks (ic)	def.	Michael Chandler	TKO (punches)	4	3:48	(Note: For the vacant Bellator Lightweight Championship)
Middleweight	Joe Schilling	def.	Melvin Manhoef	KO (punch)	2	0:32
Catchweight (143 lb)	Mike Richman	def.	Nam Phan	TKO (punches)	1	0:46
Light Heavyweight	Muhammed Lawal	def.	Joe Vedepo	TKO (punches)	3	0:39
Preliminary Card (Spike.com)
Middleweight	A.J. Matthews	def.	Kyle Bolt	TKO (punches)	1	1:39
Flyweight	Jonathan Santa Maria	def.	Ron Henderson	Decision (split) (29-28, 28-29, 30-27)	3	5:00
Featherweight	Jordan Bailey	def.	Alex Higley	Submission (rear-naked choke)	1	3:27
Flyweight	Nick Garcia	def.	Matthew Ramirez	Submission (guillotine choke)	2	0:56
Welterweight	Andy Murad	def.	Bubba Pugh	Decision (split) (29-28, 28-29, 29-28)	3	5:00
Bantamweight	Rolando Perez	vs.	Mark Vorgeas	Split Draw (29-27, 26-30, 28-28)	3	5:00
Lightweight	Joao Faria	def.	Ian Butler	Submission (head and arm choke)	3	1:58
