= Egidijus Valavičius =

Lithuanian mixed martial arts fighter

- Born: December 23, 1978 (age 47); Marijampolė, Lithuanian SSR, Soviet Union
- Height: 6 ft 1 in (1.85 m)
- Weight: 205 lb (93 kg; 14 st 9 lb)
- Division: Heavyweight; Light Heavyweight; Middleweight
- Style: MMA, Hybrid martial arts
- Stance: Orthodox
- Fighting out of: Marijampolė, Lithuania
- Team: Team Gladiator; RINGS Lithuania; Flawless MMA
- Years active: 2000–present

Mixed martial arts record
- Total: 41
- Wins: 29
- By knockout: 17
- By submission: 7
- By decision: 5
- Losses: 12
- By knockout: 3
- By submission: 5
- By decision: 4

Other information
- Mixed martial arts record from Sherdog

Egidijus Valavičius (born December 23, 1978) is a Lithuanian mixed martial artist from Marijampolė. A professional competitor since 2000, he has competed for PRIDE FC, Bellator, RINGS, and K-1.

== Mixed martial arts career ==
=== Early career ===
Valavičius made his professional debut in August 2000 in the RINGS promotion. He fought for RINGS in his first seven fights ending with a record of 4 wins and 3 losses. One of those losses was to future PRIDE Heavyweight champion Fedor Emelianenko.

For the first 12 years of his career, he fought in Japan and Eastern European countries such as his native Lithuania, Poland, Russia, and the Czech Republic. Valavičius made his North American debut in Chicago, Illinois in August 2012.

=== Bellator MMA ===
Valavičius made his debut with Bellator MMA in February 2014. He faced Atanas Djambazov at Bellator 110 and won via knockout due to a knee and punch at 48 seconds in the first round.

In the summer of 2014, Valavičius was announced as a participant in the Bellator Light Heavyweight Tournament. He faced Carlos Eduardo in the opening quarterfinals at Bellator 121 and won via split decision. He faced Liam McGeary in the semifinals at Bellator 122 and lost via TKO in the first round.

Valavičius was released from Bellator in August 2014.

== Championships and accomplishments ==
- Bellator MMA
  - Bellator 2014 Summer Series Light Heavyweight Tournament Semifinalist
- Fighting Network RINGS
  - 2001 RINGS Absolute Class Tournament Semifinalist
- Sugar Creek Showdown
  - SCS Light Heavyweight Championship (One time)
- Bushido FC
  - Bushido FC Heavyweight Championship (One time)

== Mixed martial arts record ==
Professional record breakdown
41 matches	29 wins	12 losses
By knockout	17	3
By submission	7	5
By decision	5	4

Res.	Record	Opponent	Method	Event	Date	Round	Time	Location	Notes
Loss	29–12	Tony Lopez	Decision (unanimous)	Sugar Creek Showdown 29: Thunderstruck	March 26, 2016	5	5:00	Hinton, United States	Lost SWS Light Heavyweight Championship.
Win	29–11	Jeremy Horn	Verbal Submission (injury)	Sugar Creek Showdown 28: Shockwave	November 14, 2015	1	0:56	Hinton, United States	Won SWS Light Heavyweight Championship.
Win	28–11	Yuri Gorbenko	KO (front kick)	Big Fight II in Klaipėda	December 5, 2014	1	3:55	Klaipėda, Lithuania	
Loss	27–11	Liam McGeary	TKO (knees and punches)	Bellator 122	July 25, 2014	1	2:10	Temecula, United States	Light Heavyweight Tournament Semifinal
Win	27–10	Carlos Eduardo	Decision (split)	Bellator 121	June 6, 2014	3	5:00	Thackerville, United States	Light Heavyweight Tournament Quarterfinal
Win	26–10	Atanas Djambazov	KO (knee and punch)	Bellator 110	February 28, 2014	1	0:48	Uncasville, United States	
Win	25–10	Dan McGlasson	Decision (unanimous)	Flawless FC 3: California Love	May 18, 2013	3	5:00	Inglewood, United States	
Loss	24–10	Cully Butterfield	Decision (unanimous)	Flawless FC 2: Hated	December 15, 2012	3	5:00	Chicago, United States	Middleweight bout
Win	24–9	Eric Hammerich	Submission (armbar)	Flawless FC 1: The Beginning	August 4, 2012	1	0:58	Chicago, United States	
Win	23–9	Krzysztof Morzyszek	TKO (leg kick)	Bushido HERO'S World GP 2011 Lithuania	November 19, 2011	1	N/A	Vilnius, Lithuania	
Win	22–9	Hendrik Oschmann	TKO (punches)	Bushido HERO'S World GP 2011 Lithuania	November 19, 2011	1	0:13	Vilnius, Lithuania	
Win	21–9	Sergei Sokho	Submission (triangle choke)	BUSHIDO FC 2011 IN LONDON Vol.47	November 5, 2011	1	1:14	London, United Kingdom	
Win	20–9	Gheorghe Drucioc	TKO (punches)	King of Kings: World Grand Prix 2011	October 10, 2011	1	N/A	Chișinău, Moldova	
Win	19–9	Dmitriy Bulgak	KO (punch)	King of Kings: World Grand Prix 2011	June 10, 2011	1	0:13	Lublin, Poland	
Loss	18–9	Malik Merad	TKO (doctor stoppage)	King of Kings: World Grand Prix 2011	March 19, 2011	1	N/A	Vilnius, Lithuania	
Win	18–8	Sergy Soha	TKO (knee injury)	Hero's Lithuania 2010	November 20, 2010	1	4:44	Vilnius, Lithuania	
Loss	17–8	Attila Vegh	Decision (unanimous)	HG: Heroes Gate 1	May 5, 2010	2	5:00	Prague, Czech Republic	
Win	17–7	Denis Bogdanov	Submission (neck crank)	K-1 World Grand Prix 2010 in Vilnius	April 10, 2010	1	2:14	Vilnius, Lithuania	Won vacant Bushido FC Heavyweight Championship.
Win	16–7	Alexander Grebenkin	TKO (doctor stoppage)	Bushido Lithuania: Hero's 2009	November 14, 2009	1	4:20	Vilnius, Lithuania	
Win	15–7	Antoni Chmielewski	Decision (unanimous)	Hell Cage Championship: Hell Cage 4	September 20, 2009	3	5:00	Prague, Czech Republic	
Win	14–7	Jean-Pierre Waflard	KO (punch)	Bushido Lithuania: HERO'S 2008	November 8, 2008	1	0:08	Vilnius, Lithuania	
Win	13–7	Matteo Minonzio	KO (punches)	Bushido Lithuania: The Battle Field 2008	March 16, 2008	1	4:56	Vilnius, Lithuania	
Win	12–7	Jason Jones	Decision (majority)	HERO'S Lithuania 2007	November 10, 2007	3	5:00	Vilnius, Lithuania	
Loss	11–7	Dmitry Zabolotny	Submission (armbar)	International Absolute Fighting Council: Championship Cup	December 2, 2006	1	2:15	Moscow, Russia	Heavyweight bout.
Win	11–6	Olexandr Tsurpikov	TKO (referee stoppage)	Hero's Lithuania	November 11, 2006	1	0:41	Vilnius, Lithuania	
Win	10–6	Juha Saarinen	TKO (punches)	ZST: Prestige	September 23, 2006	1	3:44	Turku, Finland	
Win	9–6	Boris Jonstomp	Decision (unanimous)	K-1: World Max Eastern Europe	March 10, 2006	3	5:00	Vilnius, Lithuania	
Loss	8–6	Jair Goncalves	Submission (rear-naked choke)	Hero's Lithuania 2005	November 20, 2005	3	2:55	Vilnius, Lithuania	
Win	8–5	Andre Fyeet	Submission (triangle choke)	RINGS Russia: CIS vs. The World	August 20, 2005	1	2:28	Turku, Finland	
Loss	7–5	Mikko Rupponen	TKO	Fight Festival 14	April 9, 2005	1	3:47	Helsinki, Finland	
Win	7–4	Andre Fyeet	TKO (punches)	Shooto Lithuania: Bushido	November 10, 2004	1	0:45	Vilnius, Lithuania	
Win	6–4	Igor Kolacin	KO (punches)	Shooto: Lithuania Gladiators	September 29, 2004	1	0:51	Vilnius, Lithuania	
Loss	5–4	Yasuhito Namekawa	Submission (guillotine choke)	PRIDE Bushido 2	February 15, 2004	1	1:07	Yokohama, Japan	Middleweight (93 kg) debut.
Win	5–3	Gela Getsadze	Submission (guillotine choke)	Shooto Lithuania: King of Bushido Stage 1	November 14, 2003	1	1:31	Vilnius, Lithuania	
Loss	4–3	Fedor Emelianenko	Submission (kimura)	RINGS Lithuania: Bushido RINGS 7: Adrenalinas	April 5, 2003	2	1:11	Vilnius, Lithuania	
Win	4–2	Krzysztof Gerke	TKO (corner stoppage)	RINGS Lithuania: Bushido RINGS 5: Shock	November 9, 2002	1	5:00	Vilnius, Lithuania	
Loss	3–2	Chris Haseman	Submission (armbar)	RINGS: World Title Series 5	December 21, 2001	1	3:08	Yokohama, Japan	2001 RINGS Absolute Class Tournament Semifinals.
Win	3–1	Yasuhito Namekawa	TKO (towel)	RINGS: World Title Series 4	October 20, 2001	1	2:18	Yokohama, Japan	2001 RINGS Absolute Class Tournament First Round.
Loss	2–1	Andrei Kopylov	Decision (unanimous)	RINGS: World Title Series 2	May 8, 2001	2	5:00	Vilnius, Lithuania	
Win	2–0	Achmed Sagidgusenov	Submission (armbar)	RINGS Lithuania: Bushido RINGS 1	October 24, 2000	2	4:37	Vilnius, Lithuania	Heavyweight debut.
Win	1–0	Denis Baykov	TKO	RINGS: Russia vs. Georgia	August 16, 2000	1	18:29	Tula, Russia	
