= Adam McDonough =

American mixed martial arts fighter

- Born: September 24, 1985 (age 41); Faribault, Minnesota, United States
- Other names: Big Gunna
- Height: 5 ft 10 in (178 cm)
- Weight: 170 lb (77 kg; 12 st 2 lb)
- Division: Welterweight (170 lb)
- Reach: 71 in (180 cm)
- Fighting out of: St. Cloud, Minnesota, United States
- Team: Performance Compound
- Rank: Purple Belt in Brazilian Jiu-Jitsu
- Years active: 2007–2014

Mixed martial arts record
- Total: 12
- Wins: 11
- By knockout: 6
- By submission: 3
- By decision: 2
- Losses: 1
- By decision: 1

Other information
- University: St. Cloud State University; North Dakota State University
- Notable school: Faribault High School
- Mixed martial arts record from Sherdog

Adam McDonough (born September 24, 1985) is an American retired mixed martial artist who competed in Bellator's Welterweight division.

== Mixed martial arts career ==
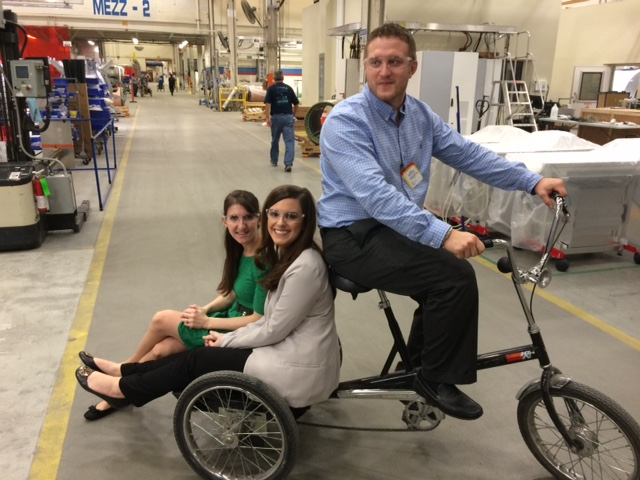

=== Early career ===
McDonough started his professional career in 2007. He fought mainly for Minnesota–based promotions as Brutaal Fight Night and Cage Fighting Xtreme, and also fought once for King of the Cage. He also trained and fought out of St. Cloud MN for Damage Inc.

After amassing a record of eight victories and no losses, McDonough signed with Bellator.

=== Bellator MMA ===
McDonough made his promotional debut against Johnny Buck on September 20, 2013, at Bellator 100. Buck was defeated via TKO due to a spinning back kick to the body and a finishing sequence of punches.

McDonough was scheduled to face Mark Scanlon in the quarterfinal match of Bellator Season 10 Welterweight Tournament on March 14, 2014, at Bellator 112. However, after the removal of Scanlon, Joe Riggs and War Machine citing injuries, the tournament line–up was shifted and McDonough instead faced Jesse Juarez. McDonough won via unanimous decision (29–28, 29–28, 29–28) and advanced to the semifinals.

In the semifinal, McDonough faced Nathan Coy on April 11, 2014, at Bellator 116. He won via knockout early in the second round.

In the final, McDonough faced Andrey Koreshkov at Bellator 122 on July 25, 2014. He lost the fight via unanimous decision, resulting in the first loss of his professional MMA career.

== Championships and accomplishments ==
- Cage Fighting Xtreme
  - CFX Welterweight Championship (One time)

== Mixed martial arts record ==
Professional record breakdown
12 matches	11 wins	1 loss
By knockout	6	0
By submission	3	0
By decision	2	1

Res.	Record	Opponent	Method	Event	Date	Round	Time	Location	Notes
Loss	11–1	Andrey Koreshkov	Decision (unanimous)	Bellator 122	July 25, 2014	3	5:00	Temecula, California, United States	Bellator Season 10 Welterweight Tournament Final
Win	11–0	Nathan Coy	TKO (punch)	Bellator 116	April 11, 2014	2	0:30	Temecula, California, United States	Bellator Season 10 Welterweight Tournament Semifinal.
Win	10–0	Jesse Juarez	Decision (unanimous)	Bellator 112	March 14, 2014	3	5:00	Hammond, Indiana, United States	Bellator Season 10 Welterweight Tournament Quarterfinal.
Win	9–0	Johnny Buck	TKO (spinning back kick and punches)	Bellator 100	September 20, 2013	1	4:51	Phoenix, Arizona, United States	
Win	8–0	James Wood	Decision (unanimous)	CFX: Hostile	October 21, 2011	3	5:00	Morton, Minnesota, United States	
Win	7–0	Matt Delanoit	KO (punches)	CFX: Gladiator Revolution	April 23, 2011	2	2:30	Brainerd, Minnesota, United States	Won CFX Welterweight Championship.
Win	6–0	B.J. VanBueskom	TKO (punches)	KOTC: Mainstream	October 29, 2010	2	2:30	Morton, Minnesota, United States	
Win	5–0	Bill Stanton	Submission (arm–triangle choke)	CFX: Armageddon in Alexandria	September 25, 2010	1	1:23	Alexandria, Minnesota, United States	
Win	4–0	Jeremy Elisius	TKO (punches)	Brutaal Fight Night 27	April 18, 2009	1	4:20	St. Cloud, Minnesota, United States	
Win	3–0	Robbie Kriesel	TKO (punches)	Brutaal Fight Night 10	April 17, 2008	1	4:40	St. Cloud, Minnesota, United States	
Win	2–0	Nick Almen	Submission (keylock)	CFX 7: Brutal	November 29, 2007	1	N/A	St. Cloud, Minnesota, United States	
Win	1–0	Troy Canfield	Submission (kimura)	Brutaal Fight Night 2	October 4, 2007	1	N/A	Maplewood, Minnesota, United States	

== See also ==
- List of Bellator MMA alumni
