= Joe Vedepo =

American mixed martial arts fighter

Joe VeDepo
- Born: Jody David VeDepo; January 1, 1983 (age 43); Iowa City, Iowa, United States
- Other names: The Doctor
- Height: 6 ft 0 in (1.83 m)
- Weight: 185 lb (84 kg; 13.2 st)
- Division: Heavyweight; Light Heavyweight; Middleweight
- Reach: 74.0 in (188 cm)
- Stance: Orthodox
- Fighting out of: Iowa City, Iowa, United States
- Team: Team HardDrive MMA; Alliance MMA; Team Lloyd Irvin; American Top Team
- Years active: 2005-2014, 2016-2017, 2019

Mixed martial arts record
- Total: 30
- Wins: 20
- By knockout: 7
- By submission: 10
- By decision: 2
- Unknown: 1
- Losses: 10
- By knockout: 5
- By submission: 3
- By decision: 2

Other information
- Mixed martial arts record from Sherdog

Jody David VeDepo is an American professional mixed martial artist currently competing in the Middleweight division. A professional competitor since 2005, he has formerly competed for the UFC and Bellator.

== Background ==
Born and raised in the small town of Columbus Junction, just outside of Iowa City, Iowa, Vedepo was a standout wrestler at Iowa City High School, winning 105 overall matches during four seasons. After high school, Vedepo began training in mixed martial arts (MMA).

== Mixed martial arts career ==
=== Early career ===
Vedepo made his professional MMA debut in November 2005. He went undefeated at 6–0 in the first two and a half years of his career.

=== Ultimate Fighting Championship ===
Vedepo was invited to compete on The Ultimate Fighter 7 but declined for unknown reasons.

Vedepo made his debut for the UFC on September 17, 2008 against Alessio Sakara at UFC Fight Night 15. He lost the fight via KO in the first round.

For his second fight, Vedepo faced Rob Kimmons at UFC Fight Night 18 on April 1, 2009. He lost the fight via submission in the first round.

Vedepo was expected to face Gerald Harris on August 28, 2010 at UFC 118, replacing an injured Alessio Sakara. On August 18, it was announced that the Vedepo/Harris bout had been scrapped from the card.

=== Independent promotions ===
Following his release from the UFC, Vedepo fought at ZT Fight Night: Heavyweights Collide, where he fought two weight classes higher at Heavyweight and on only a few days notice. He faced Oli Thompson, winning via TKO (punches) in the second round. He was expected to fight Rob Broughton to crown the tournament winner but Vedepo broke his hand in his semifinals bout against Thompson, which forced him out of the finals.

=== Bellator MMA ===
Vedepo is notable for inventing the modified shin choke, also known as the Vedepo Choke, he used this submission to win his debut bout in Bellator, at the event Bellator 80. In his next appearance, Vedepo squared off against fellow veteran Louis Taylor at Bellator 84. Vedepo was knocked out with a short right hook while he had Taylor in half guard.

Vedepo then fought longtime veteran Eddie Larea on August 10, 2013, headlining for a regional promotion in Cedar Rapids, Iowa. In an upset, Vedepo was defeated via first-round TKO.

Vedeop then faced fellow UFC veteran Kendall Grove on October 18, 2013 at Bellator 104. In a hard-fought bout, Vedepo lost via unanimous decision.

Vedepo faced Ben Crowder at Bellator 117 on April 18, 2014. He defeated Crowder via a verbal submission, as Crowder sustained a leg injury.

Vedepo then faced Cortez Coleman at Bellator 121 on June 6, 2014 and won via decision in a closely contested battle.

Vedepo faced Davin Clark at Bellator 129 on October 17, 2014. He won via TKO in the third round.

Vedepo will make a quick return to the Bellator cage as he steps in as a replacement for an injured Tom DeBlass against Muhammed Lawal on November 15, 2014 at Bellator 131. He lost the fight via TKO in the third round.

On December 4, 2014 Bellator MMA announced they released Vedepo from the promotion after he allegedly assaulted a police officer in Iowa. The incident came less than two weeks after his loss at Bellator 131, involving a reportedly-intoxicated Vedepo head butting a police officer in the chest and being tasered ineffectively, as it reportedly took several officers to subdue him. The officer Vedepo head butted was hospitalized with a back injury.

=== Independent promotions ===
Vedepo made his return on June 11, 2016, in a rematch with Eddie Larrea. Vedepo avenged his prior loss, winning via rear-naked choke submission in the first round. Vedepo most recently fought on December 29, 2017, losing via technical submission in the first round.

== Personal life ==
Vedepo has daughters and twin sons.

== Mixed martial arts record ==
Professional record breakdown
30 matches	20 wins	10 losses
By knockout	7	5
By submission	10	3
By decision	2	2
Unknown	1	0

Res.	Record	Opponent	Method	Event	Date	Round	Time	Location	Notes
Win	20–10	Virgil Knight	Submission (rear-naked choke)	Elite Fight League 7	October 18, 2019	2	0:48	Cedar Rapids, Iowa, United States	Middleweight bout.
Win	19–10	Darrius Flowers	Submission (keylock)	Elite Fight League 6	July 13, 2019	1	3:55	Cedar Rapids, Iowa, United States	Catchweight (195 lb) bout.
Loss	18–10	Daniel Vizcaya	Technical Submission (rear-naked choke)	RCC 14: Revolution Combat Championships 14	December 29, 2017	1	3:49	Cedar Rapids, Iowa, United States	For the RCC Light Heavyweight Championship.
Win	18–9	Eddie Larrea	Submission (rear-naked choke)	RCC: Revolution Cage Combat	June 11, 2016	1	3:33	Iowa City, Iowa, United States	
Loss	17–9	Muhammed Lawal	TKO (punches)	Bellator 131	November 15, 2014	3	0:39	San Diego, California, United States	Light Heavyweight bout.
Win	17–8	Davin Clark	TKO (punches)	Bellator 129	October 17, 2014	3	2:27	Council Bluffs, Iowa, United States	
Win	16–8	Cortez Coleman	Decision (majority)	Bellator 121	June 6, 2014	3	5:00	Thackerville, Oklahoma, United States	
Win	15–8	Ben Crowder	Technical Submission (leg injury)	Bellator 117	April 18, 2014	1	0:48	Council Bluffs, Iowa, United States	
Loss	14–8	Kendall Grove	Decision (unanimous)	Bellator 104	October 18, 2013	3	5:00	Cedar Rapids, Iowa, United States	
Loss	14–7	Eddie Larrea	TKO (punches)	Triple A MMA 2	August 10, 2013	1	0:45	Cedar Rapids, Iowa, United States	
Loss	14–6	Louis Taylor	KO (punches)	Bellator 84	December 14, 2012	1	4:12	Hammond, Indiana, United States	
Win	14–5	Mike Bernhard	Submission (shin choke)	Bellator 80	November 9, 2012	1	3:26	Hollywood, Florida, United States	
Loss	13–5	Jason Buck	Submission (rear-naked choke)	Pinnacle Combat MMA 10	April 27, 2012	1	0:43	Dubuque, Iowa, United States	For the vacant Pinnacle Combat Middleweight Championship.
Win	13–4	Kenneth Allen	Submission (rear-naked choke)	Extreme Challenge 202	January 28, 2012	1	2:17	Bettendorf, Iowa, United States	
Loss	12–4	Dmitry Samoilov	Decision (unanimous)	League S-70: Russia vs. Brazil	August 5, 2011	2	5:00	Sochi, Krasnodar Krai, Russia	
Win	12–3	Dennis Reed	Submission (armbar)	Revolution Combat Championships 11: Cocked and Loaded	June 19, 2010	1	1:31	Columbus Junction, Iowa, United States	
Win	11–3	Oli Thompson	TKO (punches)	ZT Fight Night: Heavyweights Collide	January 30, 2010	2	1:24	Hove, East Sussex, England	ZT Fight Night Heavyweight Tournament Semifinal.
Win	10–3	Miguel Bernard	Submission (armbar)	ZT Fight Night: Heavyweights Collide	January 30, 2010	1	0:33	Hove, East Sussex, England	ZT Fight Night Heavyweight Tournament Quarterfinal.
Win	9–3	Webster Farris	KO (punch)	Adrenaline MMA IV	September 18, 2009	1	0:14	Council Bluffs, Iowa, United States	
Loss	8–3	Rob Kimmons	Technical submission (guillotine choke)	UFC Fight Night 18	April 1, 2009	1	1:54	Nashville, Tennessee, United States	
Loss	8–2	Alessio Sakara	KO (head kick)	UFC Fight Night 15	September 17, 2008	1	1:27	Omaha, Nebraska, United States	
Win	8–1	Brian Green	Submission (verbal)	MCC 14: Pride or Fate	June 14, 2008	3	4:25	Urbandale, Iowa, United States	
Win	7–1	Karl Kelly	Submission (keylock)	Pinnacle Combat: MMA	April 26, 2008	1	1:44	Dubuque, Iowa, United States	
Loss	6–1	Mario Miranda	TKO (punches)	Carnage at the Creek 2	April 5, 2008	3	2:38	Shelton, Washington, United States	
Win	6–0	Rob Smith	TKO (knees)	XFO 22: Xtreme Fighting Organization	February 23, 2008	2	1:17	Crystal Lake, Illinois, United States	
Win	5–0	Chris Powers	Submission (kimura)	Mainstream MMA: Vengeance	October 20, 2007	1	2:55	Cedar Rapids, Iowa, United States	
Win	4–0	Todd Carney	TKO (strikes)	Extreme Challenge 83	September 1, 2007	1	4:34	Riverside, Iowa, United States	
Win	3–0	Jeremy Norwood	KO (punch)	Rwevolution Combat Championships Vol. 1: The Doctor is Out	August 17, 2007	1	1:35	West Liberty, Iowa, United States	
Win	2–0	Joe Winterfeldt	N/A	Title Fighting Championships 1	April 21, 2006	1	N/A	Des Moines, Iowa, United States	
Win	1–0	Jesse Lennox	Decision (unanimous)	Mainstream MMA 1: Inception	November 18, 2005	3	5:00	Cedar Rapids, Iowa, United States	

== See also ==
- List of male mixed martial artists
- List of Bellator MMA alumni
