= Kelly Anundson =

American mixed martial arts fighter

- Born: August 29, 1984 (age 42); Elma, Washington, United States
- Other names: Crossface
- Height: 5 ft 11 in (1.80 m)
- Weight: 226 lb (103 kg; 16 st 2 lb)
- Division: Heavyweight; Light Heavyweight
- Fighting out of: Reno, Nevada, United States
- Team: American Top Team
- Years active: 2010-2014; 2018

Mixed martial arts record
- Total: 14
- Wins: 11
- By knockout: 2
- By submission: 7
- By decision: 2
- Losses: 3
- By submission: 3

Other information
- Mixed martial arts record from Sherdog

Kelly Anundson (born August 29, 1984) is an American mixed martial artist. A professional competitor since 2010, Anundson has previously competed for Bellator, and was also a contestant on The Ultimate Fighter 19.

== Background ==
Born and raised in a trucking family in Elma, Washington, Anundson began wrestling at the age of five. Talented, Anundson would go on to be a state champion in high school before continuing his career at Lassen College in California, and then transferred to Newberry College in South Carolina, where he was a three-time All-American. Anundson later began competing in mixed martial arts and grappling tournaments before he began training with American Top Team.

== Mixed martial arts career ==
=== Early career ===
Anundson made his MMA debut in 2010. He won his first three bouts in the Palmetto Boxing Promotions organization before losing to UFC veteran Francis Carmont and Steven Cnudde, both via armbar submission. Anundson returned to the Palmetto Boxing Promotions, defeating Wade Hamilton via rear-naked choke submission in the first round. Anundson would win his next two bouts, both by stoppage in the first round.

=== The Ultimate Fighter ===
Anundson appeared as one of the contestants on The Ultimate Fighter 19, he faced future winner of the show Corey Anderson in the fight to get into the TUF house. He lost via unanimous decision, thus ending his run on the show.

=== Bellator MMA ===
Anundson made his Bellator debut on April 4, 2014, against Volkan Oezdemir at Bellator 115. He defeated Oezdemir via neck crank submission in the second round.

Anundson entered in the Bellator 2014 summer series light heavyweight tournament. He defeated Rodney Wallace in the quarterfinals at Bellator 121 on June 6, 2014, via three-round unanimous decision to move on to the semifinals.

Anundson faced Philipe Lins in the semifinals at Bellator 122 on July 25, 2014. In the first round, Lins injured his left knee while attempting a punch, causing the referee to stop the bout in favour of Anundson.

Anundson faced Liam McGeary in the finals on September 12, 2014, at Bellator 124. He lost the fight via submission in the first round.

== Championships and accomplishments ==
- Bellator MMA
  - Bellator 2014 Summer Series Light Heavyweight Tournament Runner-Up

== Mixed martial arts record ==
Professional record breakdown
14 matches	11 wins	3 losses
By knockout	2	0
By submission	7	3
By decision	2	0

Res.	Record	Opponent	Method	Event	Date	Round	Time	Location	Notes
Win	11–3	Randy Billiot	Submission (americana)	Conflict MMA 57	May 27, 2023	1	1:13	Columbia, South Carolina, United States	Heavyweight debut.
Win	10–3	Joey Cabezas	Submission	High Desert Brawl 13	August 25, 2018	1	1:53	Susanville, California, United States	
Loss	9–3	Liam McGeary	Submission (inverted triangle choke)	Bellator 124	September 12, 2014	1	4:47	Plymouth Township, Michigan, United States	Bellator 2014 Summer Series Light Heavyweight Tournament Final.
Win	9–2	Philipe Lins	TKO (knee injury)	Bellator 122	July 25, 2014	1	1:40	Temecula, California, United States	Bellator 2014 Summer Series Light Heavyweight Tournament Semifinal.
Win	8–2	Rodney Wallace	Decision (unanimous)	Bellator 121	June 6, 2014	3	5:00	Thackerville, Oklahoma, United States	Bellator 2014 Summer Series Light Heavyweight Tournament Quarterfinal.
Win	7–2	Volkan Oezdemir	Submission (neck crank)	Bellator 115	April 4, 2014	2	3:19	Las Vegas, Nevada, United States	
Win	6–2	Carlos Zevallos	TKO (punches)	Fight Time 12: Warriors Collide	November 2, 2012	1	2:52	Fort Lauderdale, Florida, United States	
Win	5–2	Alessandro de Oliveira	Submission (north-south choke)	Lions Fighting Championship 2	March 10, 2012	1	N/A	Neuchâtel, Switzerland	
Win	4–2	Wade Hamilton	Submission (rear-naked choke)	Palmetto Boxing Promotions: Fight Night at the Point	June 24, 2011	1	1:00	Mount Pleasant, South Carolina, United States	
Loss	3–2	Steven Cnudde	Submission (armbar)	HFC 3: France vs. Europe	May 6, 2011	2	2:36	Martigny, Valais, Switzerland	
Loss	3–1	Francis Carmont	Submission (armbar)	SHC 4: Monson vs. Perak	April 30, 2011	1	2:06	Geneva, Switzerland	
Win	3–0	Jesus Santiago	Submission (north-south choke)	Palmetto Boxing Promotions: Judgment Day 1	August 26, 2010	1	1:41	Columbia, South Carolina, United States	
Win	2–0	Dann Cucuta	Submission (armbar)	Palmetto Boxing Promotions: Rage in the Cage	April 24, 2010	1	3:13	Columbia, South Carolina, United States	
Win	1–0	Chris McNally	Decision (unanimous)	Palmetto Boxing Promotions: Mayhem at the Medallion Center	January 30, 2010	3	5:00	Columbia, South Carolina, United States	

== Mixed martial arts exhibition record ==
Exhibition record breakdown		
1 match	0 wins	1 loss
By decision	0	1

Res.	Record	Opponent	Method	Event	Date	Round	Time	Location	Notes
Loss	0–1	Corey Anderson	Decision (unanimous)	The Ultimate Fighter: Team Edgar vs. Team Penn	Apr 16, 2014 (airdate)	2	5:00	Las Vegas, Nevada, United States	The Ultimate Fighter 19 Elimination round.
