= Liam McGeary =

British mixed martial artist (born 1982)

- Born: 4 October 1982 (age 44); King's Lynn, Norfolk, England
- Height: 6 ft 6 in (1.98 m)
- Weight: 205 lb (93 kg; 14.6 st)
- Division: Light Heavyweight
- Reach: 81 in (206 cm)
- Stance: Orthodox
- Fighting out of: Toms River, New Jersey, United States
- Team: Team Church Street Boxing; Team Renzo Gracie; Gracie Barra Channel Islands
- Rank: Black belt in Brazilian Jiu-Jitsu
- Years active: 2010–present

Kickboxing record
- Total: 1
- Wins: 1
- By knockout: 1

Mixed martial arts record
- Total: 17
- Wins: 13
- By knockout: 7
- By submission: 5
- By decision: 1
- Losses: 4
- By knockout: 2
- By submission: 1
- By decision: 1

Other information
- Mixed martial arts record from Sherdog

Liam McGeary (born 4 October 1982) is an English former professional mixed martial artist who competed in Bellator's Light Heavyweight division. He is a former Bellator Light Heavyweight World Champion.

== Mixed martial arts career ==
=== Early career ===
McGeary began training in mixed martial arts in 2009, and held an amateur record of 1–1 before making his professional debut in 2010. He won the first two fights of his professional career via submission and picked up a knockout win before signing with Bellator MMA.

McGeary competed in kickboxing in November 2009 and knocked out Kieron Vance in the first round of the Kickboxing Fight Show heavyweight division at the Wolversdene Club in Andover, Hampshire.

McGeary took part in the 2013 IBJJF World Championships, in the purple belt/super heavyweight division. McGeary won the first three matches, by armbar (round 1), triangle-choke (round 2) and armbar (round 3), before losing in the 4th round by points. McGeary won the London Seni BJJ 2010 tournament in the super heavyweight/blue belt division.

=== Bellator MMA ===
In his Bellator debut, McGeary faced Anton Talamantes at Bellator 95 on 4 April 2013 and won via TKO at 78 seconds of the first round.

In his next appearance for the organisation at Bellator 100 on 20 September 2013, McGeary faced off against Beau Tribolet and won via knockout only 27 seconds into the fight.

McGeary faced Najim Wali on 15 November 2013 at Bellator 108. He won via submission due to an armbar early in the first round.

In the summer of 2014, McGeary was announced as a participant in the Bellator Light Heavyweight Tournament. He faced Mike Mucitelli in the opening quarterfinals at Bellator 118 and won via knockout in the first round. Later, at Bellator 122, he faced Egidijus Valavicius in the semifinals, he won the fight by TKO in the first round. McGeary faced Kelly Anundson in the finals at Bellator 124 on 12 September 2014. He won the fight via inverted triangle choke in the first round.

McGeary faced Emanuel Newton for his Bellator Light Heavyweight Championship on 27 February 2015 at Bellator 134. He won the fight via unanimous decision to become the new Bellator Light Heavyweight champion. During the course of the fight, McGeary attempted several submission attempts, including nearly finishing Newton in the first and third rounds with a triangle choke. In all, he set the record (11) for the number of submission attempts in Bellator history.

In March 2015, McGeary signed a multi-fight and multi-year contract extension with the promotion.

McGeary made his first title defense against Tito Ortiz on 19 September 2015 at Bellator 142. He submitted Ortiz with an inverted triangle choke in the first round to retain his championship.

After over a year away from the sport due to a knee injury, McGeary faced Phil Davis at Bellator 163 on 4 November 2016. He lost the bout and his title via unanimous decision.

After losing his title, McGeary returned to the cage in the main event at Bellator 173. McGeary saw his opponent switch three times as he was originally supposed to face Chris Fields. However, on 20 February, it was announced that Fields had to withdraw from the match due to injury. The initial replacement for Fields was announced as Bellator newcomer Vladimir Filipovic. However, Filipovic also was pulled from the bout due to visa issues. McGeary eventually faced Bellator newcomer Brett McDermott. He won the fight via TKO in the second round.

McGeary faced Linton Vassell at Bellator 179 on 19 May 2017. He lost the fight via arm-triangle choke submission in the third round. This was the first stoppage loss of his professional MMA career.

McGeary was expected to face Muhammed Lawal at Bellator 185 on 20 October 2017. However, Lawal pulled out of the bout on 2 October due to an undisclosed injury. He was then scheduled to face late replacement Bubba McDaniel, however, McGeary pulled out of the fight, also due to injury.

McGeary faced Vadim Nemkov on 16 February 2018 at Bellator 194. He lost the fight via TKO in the third round due to leg kicks.

McGeary faced former Strikeforce light heavyweight champion Muhammed Lawal on 15 December 2018 at Bellator 213. He won the fight via TKO in the third round.

McGeary next faced Phil Davis at Bellator 220 on April 27, 2019. He lost the fight via TKO in the third round.

On July 10, 2021, it was announced that he was no longer under contract with Bellator.

== Personal life ==
McGeary is married and has children.

== Championships and accomplishments ==
- Bellator MMA
  - Bellator Light Heavyweight World Championship (One time)
    - One successful title defence
  - Bellator 2014 Summer Series Light Heavyweight Tournament Championship
  - Most submission attempts in a single fight (11)
- MMA Junkie
  - 2015 Breakout Fighter of the Year
  - September 2014 Submission of the Month vs. Kelly Anundson
  - September 2015 Submission of the Month vs. Tito Ortiz
- Inside MMA
  - 2014 Submission of the Year Bazzie Award vs. Kelly Anundson at Bellator 124

== Mixed martial arts record ==
Professional record breakdown
17 matches	13 wins	4 losses
By knockout	7	2
By submission	5	1
By decision	1	1

Res.	Record	Opponent	Method	Event	Date	Round	Time	Location	Notes
Loss	13–4	Phil Davis	TKO (jaw injury)	Bellator 220	27 April 2019	3	4:11	San Jose, California, United States	
Win	13–3	Muhammed Lawal	TKO (punches)	Bellator 213	15 December 2018	3	0:53	Honolulu, Hawaii, United States	
Loss	12–3	Vadim Nemkov	TKO (leg kicks)	Bellator 194	16 February 2018	3	4:02	Uncasville, Connecticut, United States	
Loss	12–2	Linton Vassell	Submission (arm-triangle choke)	Bellator 179	19 May 2017	3	2:28	London, England	
Win	12–1	Brett McDermott	TKO (doctor stoppage)	Bellator 173	24 February 2017	2	1:06	Belfast, Northern Ireland	Catchweight bout (215 lb).
Loss	11–1	Phil Davis	Decision (unanimous)	Bellator 163	4 November 2016	5	5:00	Uncasville, Connecticut, United States	Lost the Bellator Light Heavyweight World Championship
Win	11–0	Tito Ortiz	Submission (inverted triangle choke)	Bellator 142: Dynamite 1	19 September 2015	1	4:41	San Jose, California, United States	Defended the Bellator Light Heavyweight World Championship.
Win	10–0	Emanuel Newton	Decision (unanimous)	Bellator 134	27 February 2015	5	5:00	Uncasville, Connecticut, United States	Won the Bellator Light Heavyweight World Championship.
Win	9–0	Kelly Anundson	Submission (inverted triangle choke)	Bellator 124	12 September 2014	1	4:47	Plymouth Township, Michigan, United States	2014 Summer Series Light Heavyweight Tournament Final.
Win	8–0	Egidijus Valavicius	TKO (knees and punches)	Bellator 122	25 July 2014	1	2:10	Temecula, California, United States	2014 Summer Series Light Heavyweight Tournament Semifinal.
Win	7–0	Mike Mucitelli	KO (punch)	Bellator 118	2 May 2014	1	0:22	Atlantic City, New Jersey, United States	2014 Summer Series Light Heavyweight Tournament Quarterfinal.
Win	6–0	Najim Wali	Submission (armbar)	Bellator 108	15 November 2013	1	1:31	Atlantic City, New Jersey, United States	
Win	5–0	Beau Tribolet	KO (punch)	Bellator 100	20 September 2013	1	0:27	Phoenix, Arizona, United States	
Win	4–0	Anton Talamantes	TKO (elbows and punches)	Bellator 95	4 April 2013	1	1:18	Atlantic City, New Jersey, United States	
Win	3–0	Walter Howard	KO (punch)	Ring of Combat 41	15 June 2012	2	0:41	Atlantic City, New Jersey, United States	202 lb Catchweight bout.
Win	2–0	Shaun Lomas	Submission (triangle armbar)	Island Rumble 3: Ballistic	15 October 2011	1	1:16	Fort Regent, Jersey, UK	Won the ICO British Light Heavyweight Championship.
Win	1–0	Grzegorz Janus	Submission (armbar)	Battle of Jersey	8 May 2010	3	4:45	Saint Helier, Jersey, UK	

== See also ==
- List of male mixed martial artists
