= Joe Pacheco =

American MMA fighter (born 1985)

- Born: Joseph Pacheco; February 19, 1985 (age 41); Queens, New York, U.S.
- Other names: The Juggernaut
- Height: 5 ft 10 in (1.78 m)
- Weight: 185 lb (84 kg; 13.2 st)
- Division: Middleweight (185 lb); Light Heavyweight (205 lb)
- Reach: 73.0 in (185 cm)
- Fighting out of: Gastonia, North Carolina, U.S.
- Team: Renegade Fighting Systems
- Years active: 2011–2014

Mixed martial arts record
- Total: 10
- Wins: 7
- By knockout: 1
- By submission: 4
- By decision: 2
- Losses: 2
- By submission: 1
- By decision: 1
- No contests: 1

Other information
- Notable school: East Gaston High School (NC)
- Mixed martial arts record from Sherdog

Joe Pacheco (born February 19, 1985) is an American mixed martial artist of Puerto Rican and Belizean descent who competes in Bellator's middleweight division.

== Mixed martial arts career ==
=== Early career ===
Pacheco started his professional career in 2012. He fought only for American southeastern and Pennsylvania-based promotions.

In 2013, Pacheco signed with Bellator.

=== Bellator MMA ===
Pacheco made his debut against Kyle Bolt on February 14, 2013, at Bellator 89. He won via knockout in the second round.

Pacheco was expected to face Luc Bondole on March 21, 2013, at Bellator 93. However, Bondole was replaced by Pierry Pierre due to undisclosed reasons. Pacheco won via submission due to a keylock early in the first round.

Pacheco was expected to face Tyson Jeffries on September 27, 2013, at Bellator 101. However, Pacheco was called to replace an injured Perry Filkins against Brennan Ward in Bellator season nine middleweight tournament on October 4, 2013, at Bellator 102. Pacheco had his first professional career's defeat via submission due to a guillotine choke in the second round.

In March 2014, Pacheco entered into the Bellator Season 10 Middleweight tournament when Dan Cramer versus Jeremy Kimball was cancelled. He faced Brandon Halsey at Bellator 116 on April 11, 2014. He lost the fight via unanimous decision.

Pacheco faced Keith Berry on October 3, 2014, at Bellator 127. He initially lost the fight via split decision. However, Berry failed his post-fight drug test and the California commission changed the result to a No Contest.

== Championships and accomplishments ==
=== Amateur wrestling ===
- North Carolina High School Athletic Association
  - North Carolina 3A 189 lb State Champion out of East Gaston High School (2002, 2003)

== Mixed martial arts record ==
Professional record breakdown
10 matches	7 wins	2 losses
By knockout	1	0
By submission	4	1
By decision	2	1
No contests	1	

Res.	Record	Opponent	Method	Event	Date	Round	Time	Location	Notes
NC	7–2 (1)	Keith Berry	No Contest	Bellator 127	October 3, 2014	3	5:00	Temecula, California, United States	Originally a split decision win for Berry; overturned after failing a drug test.
Loss	7–2	Brandon Halsey	Decision (unanimous)	Bellator 116	April 11, 2014	3	5:00	Temecula, California, United States	Bellator Season 10 Middleweight Tournament Semifinal
Loss	7–1	Brennan Ward	Submission (guillotine choke)	Bellator 102	October 4, 2013	2	2:41	Visalia, California, United States	Bellator season 9 middleweight tournament semifinal.
Win	7–0	Amaechi Oselukwue	Decision (unanimous)	Fight Lab 32	July 27, 2013	3	5:00	Charlotte, North Carolina, United States	
Win	6–0	Pierry Pierre	Submission (keylock)	Bellator 93	March 21, 2013	1	1:54	Lewiston, Maine, United States	
Win	5–0	Kyle Bolt	KO (elbows)	Bellator 89	February 14, 2013	2	4:02	Charlotte, North Carolina, United States	
Win	4–0	Nathan Gaylord	Decision (unanimous)	Wild Bill's Fight Night 51	December 15, 2012	3	5:00	Duluth, Georgia, United States	
Win	3–0	Jason Heflin	Submission (armbar)	Xtreme Caged Combat: Backlash	November 2, 2012	2	4:12	Philadelphia, Pennsylvania, United States	
Win	2–0	Darnell Hayes	Submission (rear-naked choke)	Central Pennsylvania Warrior Challenge 20	September 22, 2012	1	3:30	Millersville, Pennsylvania, United States	195 lb catchweight bout.
Win	1–0	Lindsay Rowse	Submission (armbar)	Wild Bill's Fight Night 48	July 28, 2012	1	3:57	Duluth, Georgia, United States	

=== Mixed martial arts amateur record ===
Res.	Record	Opponent	Method	Event	Date	Round	Time	Location	Notes
Loss	1–1	Ferdinando Acerra	Submission (guillotine choke)	Fight Lab 22	March 30, 2011	2	1:26	Sumter, South Carolina, United States	
Win	1–0	Tony Scarlett	Submission (punches)	Fight Lab 16: MMA Cage Fights	August 6, 2011	1	1:59	Charlotte, North Carolina, United States	
