= Dave Vitkay =

American mixed martial arts fighter

- Born: May 22, 1980 (age 46); Lincoln Park, Michigan, United States
- Other names: The A-Town Ogre
- Height: 6 ft 2 in (1.88 m)
- Weight: 170 lb (77 kg; 12 st)
- Division: Middleweight; Welterweight
- Reach: 75.0 in (191 cm)
- Stance: Orthodox
- Fighting out of: Atlanta, Georgia, United States
- Team: Knuckle Up Fitness
- Years active: 2002–present

Mixed martial arts record
- Total: 32
- Wins: 18
- By knockout: 4
- By submission: 10
- By decision: 4
- Losses: 13
- By knockout: 9
- By submission: 2
- By decision: 2
- Draws: 1

Other information
- Mixed martial arts record from Sherdog

Dave Vitkay (born May 22, 1980) is an American mixed martial artist currently competing in the Welterweight division. A professional competitor since 2002, he has formerly competed for Bellator MMA.

== Background ==
Born and raised in the suburbs of Detroit, Michigan, Vitkay competed in ice hockey and baseball growing up. He began training in martial arts and MMA upon moving to Atlanta, Georgia, where he also works as a trainer.

== Mixed martial arts career ==
=== Early career ===
Vitkay began training in mixed martial arts at the age of 20 and made his professional debut in 2002. Vitkay compiled an overall record of 11-12-1 before being signed by Bellator.

=== Bellator MMA ===
Vitkay was expected to make his Bellator debut on February 7, 2013 against then-undefeated Kelvin Tiller at Bellator 88. However, Tiller failed to make weight and the fight was subsequently cancelled.

Vitkay made his Bellator debut on March 21, 2013 at Bellator 93 against Jesse Peterson. Vitkay won the fight via technical submission due to a guillotine choke, just 18 seconds into the first round.

Vitkay was then expected to face Brennan Ward at Bellator 98 on September 7, 2013. However, Vitkay was removed from the event after Ward was called to replace Andreas Spång against Justin Torrey in the quarterfinals of the Bellator season nine middleweight tournament at the same event.

Vitkay faced Tyson Jeffries at Bellator 101 on September 27, 2013. Vitkay won via third-round rear-naked choke submission.

In his next appearance, Vitkay faced Keith Berry at Bellator 116 on April 11, 2014. Vitkay won via unanimous decision.

== Mixed martial arts record ==
Professional record breakdown
32 matches	18 wins	13 losses
By knockout	4	9
By submission	10	2
By decision	4	2
Draws	1	

Res.	Record	Opponent	Method	Event	Date	Round	Time	Location	Notes
Loss	18–13–1	Jeremie Holloway	TKO (punches)	LFA 8: Hamilton vs. Bazzi	April 7, 2017	1	2:55	Greenville, South Carolina, United States	
Win	18–12–1	Jared Gooden	Decision (unanimous)	NFC 86	August 27, 2016	3	2:44	Atlanta, Georgia, United States	Won NFC Welterweight Championship.
Win	17–12–1	Cody Wilson	Decision (unanimous)	Legacy FC 53	April 8, 2016	3	5:00	Atlanta, Georgia, United States	
Win	16–12–1	Wesley Barnes	TKO (injury)	Legacy FC 47	October 16, 2015	2	5:00	Atlanta, Georgia, United States	Welterweight debut.
Win	15–12–1	Tommy Jones	Submission (straight armbar)	Legacy FC 40	March 20, 2015	3	2:44	Duluth, Georgia, United States	
Win	14–12–1	Keith Berry	Decision (unanimous)	Bellator 116	April 11, 2014	3	5:00	Temecula, California, United States	
Win	13–12–1	Tyson Jeffries	Submission (rear-naked choke)	Bellator 101	September 27, 2013	3	3:07	Portland, Oregon, United States	
Win	12–12–1	Jesse Peterson	Technical Submission (guillotine choke)	Bellator 93	March 21, 2013	1	0:18	Lewiston, Maine, United States	
Win	11–12–1	Adam Dehart	Submission (guillotine choke)	Wild Bill's Fight Night 48	July 28, 2012	2	4:24	Duluth, Georgia, United States	
Loss	10–12–1	Brett Chism	KO (punches)	Wild Bill's Fight Night 44	March 9, 2012	1	3:58	Duluth, Georgia, United States	
Loss	10–11–1	Kendrick Miree	KO (punch)	K.O. Kings: King of the Ring 5	December 10, 2011	1	3:22	Atlanta, Georgia, United States	
Win	10–10–1	Roger Carroll	Decision (unanimous)	Sportfight X: Atlanta	July 23, 2011	3	5:00	Atlanta, Georgia, United States	
Draw	9–10–1	Warren Thompson	Draw	BFN 7: Showdown at Center Stage	August 21, 2010	3	5:00	Atlanta, Georgia, United States	
Win	9–10	Warren Thompson	Submission (rear-naked choke)	SportFight X 1: Beatdown	March 26, 2010	2	3:38	Atlanta, Georgia, United States	
Loss	8–10	Brett Chism	KO (punches)	Wild Bill's Fight Night 22	September 12, 2009	1	3:18	Duluth, Georgia, United States	
Loss	8–9	Jesse Forbes	TKO (punches)	Wild Bill's Fight Night 19	April 17, 2009	1	2:05	Duluth, Georgia, United States	
Win	8–8	Todd Carney	Submission (guillotine choke)	Wild Bill's Fight Night 17	November 8, 2008	2	0:37	Atlanta, Georgia, United States	
Win	7–8	Steve Sawyer	Submission (guillotine choke)	Wild Bill's Fight Night 16	September 19, 2008	1	0:30	Duluth, Georgia, United States	
Loss	6–8	Scott Harper	Decision (split)	ISCF: Return of the Kings	September 28, 2007	3	5:00	N/A	
Loss	6–7	James Damien Stelly	TKO	Xtreme Freestyle Fighting 3	October 14, 2006	1	N/A	Columbus, Georgia, United States	
Win	6–6	Todd Seyler	TKO (doctor stoppage)	H2H: Hand 2 Hand Combat	June 17, 2005	1	N/A	Canton, Ohio, United States	
Loss	5–6	Ron Fields	TKO (punches)	Freestyle Fighting Championships 12	September 24, 2004	2	N/A	Indiana, United States	
Loss	5–5	Michael Patt	Submission (armbar)	Freestyle Fighting Championships 10	July 24, 2004	1	3:14	Tunica, Mississippi, United States	
Win	5–4	Jason Braswell	Submission (guillotine choke)	Freestyle Fighting Championships 10	July 24, 2004	1	0:25	Tunica, Mississippi, United States	
Win	4–4	Leo Sylvest	Submission (rib injury)	Freestyle Fighting Championships 10	July 24, 2004	2	1;11	Tunica, Mississippi, United States	
Loss	3–4	Lance Everson	Decision (unanimous)	CZ 7: Gravel Pit	July 10, 2004	2	5:00	Revere, Massachusetts, United States	
Loss	3–3	Hector Ramirez	TKO (punches)	GC 26: FightFest 1	June 2, 2004	1	1:38	California, United States	
Loss	3–2	Joe Riggs	KO (punches)	ICC: Trials 2	April 30, 2004	1	N/A	Minnesota, United States	
Win	3–1	George Crawford	Submission (guillotine choke)	Dangerzone 26: Professional Level Cage Fighting	April 10, 2004	1	4:39	Osceola, Iowa, United States	
Win	2–1	Tyrone Roberts	KO (punches)	Dangerzone 26: Professional Level Cage Fighting	April 10, 2004	1	4:05	Osceola, Iowa, United States	
Win	1–1	Doug Sauer	TKO (punches)	ROF 9: Eruption	August 9, 2003	2	N/A	Baraboo, Wisconsin, United States	
Loss	0–1	Mike Mackenzie	Submission (rear-naked choke)	TFC 6: Fightzone 6	December 13, 2002	2	N/A	Toledo, Ohio, United States	
