= Shahbulat Shamhalaev =

Russian mixed martial arts fighter

- Born: August 27, 1983 (age 43); Makhachkala, Russian SFSR, Soviet Union
- Native name: Шахбулат Шамхалаев
- Other names: Shah (checkmate); Assassin
- Nationality: Russian
- Height: 5 ft 6 in (1.68 m)
- Weight: 145 lb (66 kg; 10.4 st)
- Division: Featherweight
- Reach: 66 1/2 in (169 cm)
- Style: Muay Thai, Sanshou, Karate, Submission Wrestling
- Fighting out of: Makhachkala, Dagestan; Fairfield, New Jersey; Ithaca, New York
- Team: Goretz MMA; Team BombSquad; Red Fury Fight Team; American Top Team
- Rank: International Master of Sports in Muay Thai; Master of Sports in Sanshou; Black belt in Karate
- Years active: 2009–2016

Mixed martial arts record
- Total: 16
- Wins: 12
- By knockout: 8
- By submission: 1
- By decision: 3
- Losses: 3
- By submission: 3
- Draws: 1

Other information
- Mixed martial arts record from Sherdog

Shahbulat Shamhalaev (Russian: Шахбулат Шамхалаев; born August 27, 1983) is a Russian retired mixed martial artist and kickboxer. He competed in the featherweight division for the Bellator Fighting Championships. Shahbulat is Muay Thai World Champion and Muay Thai Republic of Dagestan Champion.

== Mixed martial arts career ==
=== Early career ===
On November 3, 2009, at the M-1 Challenge – 2009 Selections event, Shamhalaev lost to the future UFC Lightweight champion Khabib Nurmagomedov via submission (armbar) in the first round.

Before leaving for the United States, he had a record of 9–1–1.

=== Bellator MMA ===
In 2012, Shamhalaev started training in Team BombSquad with Pat Bennett, Mike Massenzio, John Franchi, Anthony Leone and Kenny Foster.

Shamhalaev faced Cody Bollinger in the opening round of the Bellator Season 7 Featherweight tournament on October 12, 2012, at Bellator 76. He won the fight via TKO in the first round.

Shamhalaev faced Mike Richman in Semifinal Season 7 Featherweight tournament on November 2, 2012, at Bellator 79. He won via brutal KO in the first round.

Shamhalaev eventually faced Rad Martinez in the finals of the Season Seven Featherweight Tournament on February 21, 2013, at Bellator 90. He won the fight via KO in the second round.

Shamhalaev received his title shot against Pat Curran on April 4, 2013, at Bellator 95. He lost the fight via guillotine choke submission in the first round.

Shamhalaev was expected to face Akop Stepanyan in next Featherweight tournament beginning September 13, 2013, at Bellator 99. However, on September 9, it was revealed he was forced to pull out of the tournament due to his ailing father.

Shamhalaev was expected to face Fabricio Guerreiro on May 9, 2014, at Bellator 119. The fight, however, was cancelled when Guerreiro was injured. The bout was rescheduled and took place at Bellator 120 in Southaven, Mississippi. He lost the fight via first round kimura submission.

On August 25, 2014, Shamhalaev was released from Bellator, along with former Bellator Light Heavyweight champion Attila Végh and eleven other fighters.

=== Post-Bellator ===
On June 1, 2016, over two years since his last MMA fight, Shamhalaev was shot multiple times in Makhachkala, Russia. As of September 2016, he planned to return to MMA after he recovered from his wounds. In December 2016, he announced his retirement from professional career in MMA.

== Championships and accomplishments ==
=== Mixed martial arts ===
- Bellator Fighting Championships
  - Bellator Season 7 Featherweight Tournament Winner

=== Muay Thai ===
- WBL
  - Muay Thai World Champion (Dubai, 2007)

=== Kickboxing ===
- Russian Kick-Boxing Federation
  - Kickboxing Russian National Champion

=== Sanshou ===
- Russian Sanshou Federation
  - Sanshou Russian National Champion

=== Karate ===
- Russian Karate Federation
  - Karate Russian Champion

== Mixed martial arts record ==
Professional record breakdown
| 16 matches | 12 wins | 3 losses |
| By knockout | 8 | 0 |
| By submission | 1 | 3 |
| By decision | 3 | 0 |
| Draws | 1 | |

| Res. | Record | Opponent | Method | Event | Date | Round | Time | Location | Notes |
|---|---|---|---|---|---|---|---|---|---|
| Loss | 12–3–1 | Fabricio Guerreiro | Submission (kimura) | Bellator 120 | May 17, 2014 | 1 | 3:29 | Southaven, Mississippi, United States | |
| Loss | 12–2–1 | Pat Curran | Technical Submission (guillotine choke) | Bellator 95 | April 4, 2013 | 1 | 2:38 | Atlantic City, New Jersey, United States | For Bellator Featherweight Championship. |
| Win | 12–1–1 | Rad Martinez | KO (punch) | Bellator 90 | February 21, 2013 | 2 | 2:12 | West Valley City, Utah, United States | Bellator Season 7 Featherweight Tournament Final. |
| Win | 11–1–1 | Mike Richman | KO (punches) | Bellator 79 | November 2, 2012 | 1 | 1:45 | Rama, Ontario, Canada | Bellator Season 7 Featherweight Tournament Semifinal. |
| Win | 10–1–1 | Cody Bollinger | TKO (punches) | Bellator 76 | October 12, 2012 | 1 | 4:49 | Windsor, Ontario, Canada | Bellator Season 7 Featherweight Tournament Quarterfinal. |
| Win | 9–1–1 | Ramazan Sulebanov | KO (head kick and punches) | WMAC - Finals | October 9, 2011 | 2 | 3:15 | Yalta, Crimea, Russia | WMAC 2011 Lightweight Tournament Final. |
| Win | 8–1–1 | Muslim Umaev | KO (punches) | WMAC - Semifinals | October 8, 2011 | 2 | 4:58 | Yalta, Crimea, Russia | WMAC 2011 Lightweight Tournament Semifinal. |
| Win | 7–1–1 | Yves Landu | Decision (unanimous) | M-1 Selection 2011: European Tournament | April 1, 2011 | 3 | 5:00 | Makhachkala, Republic of Dagestan, Russia | |
| Draw | 6–1–1 | Astemir Fakov | Draw | PSFDC - Pancration SFD Championship 4 | December 3, 2010 | 2 | 5:00 | Sochi, Krasnodar Krai, Russia | |
| Win | 6–1 | Andrii Liezhniev | Decision (unanimous) | MFT - Battle of Volga 3 | May 7, 2010 | 3 | 5:00 | Volgograd, Volgograd Oblast, Russia | |
| Win | 5–1 | Yunus Tagirov | Submission (armbar) | MFT - Russia's Cup | November 9, 2009 | 1 | 1:22 | Volgograd, Volgograd Oblast, Russia | MFT 2009 Russia's Cup Lightweight Tournament Final. |
| Win | 4–1 | Sheikh Arapkhanov | KO (head kick) | MFT - Russia's Cup | November 9, 2009 | 1 | 2:46 | Volgograd, Volgograd Oblast, Russia | MFT 2009 Russia's Cup Lightweight Tournament Semifinal. |
| Win | 3–1 | Valery Varankin | TKO (retirement) | MFT - Russia's Cup | November 9, 2009 | 2 | 3:19 | Volgograd, Volgograd Oblast, Russia | MFT 2009 Russia's Cup Lightweight Tournament Quarterfinal. |
| Loss | 2–1 | Khabib Nurmagomedov | Submission (armbar) | M-1 Challenge: 2009 Selections 9 | November 3, 2009 | 1 | 4:36 | Saint Petersburg, Leningrad Oblast, Russia | |
| Win | 2–0 | Radzha Khizriev | TKO (punches) | M-1 Challenge: 2009 Selections 6 | September 5, 2009 | 2 | 1:22 | Makhachkala, Republic of Dagestan, Russia | |
| Win | 1–0 | Oma Tashuev | Decision (unanimous) | MFT - Battle in Zhara | July 24, 2009 | 3 | 5:00 | Volgograd, Volgograd Oblast, Russia | |
