= Chris Saunders (mixed martial artist) =

American mixed martial artist (born 1986)

- Born: March 11, 1986 (age 40); United States
- Other names: The So Cal Kid
- Height: 5 ft 8 in (1.73 m)
- Weight: 155 lb (70 kg; 11.1 st)
- Division: Lightweight
- Team: All In MMA
- Years active: 2009-present

Mixed martial arts record
- Total: 24
- Wins: 16
- By knockout: 3
- By submission: 7
- By decision: 6
- Losses: 8
- By knockout: 1
- By submission: 3
- By decision: 4

Other information
- Mixed martial arts record from Sherdog

Chris Saunders (born March 11, 1986) is an American mixed martial artist. He competes in the lightweight division.

== Mixed martial arts record ==
Professional record breakdown
24 matches	16 wins	8 losses
By knockout	3	1
By submission	7	3
By decision	6	4

Res.	Record	Opponent	Method	Event	Date	Round	Time	Location	Notes
Win	16–8	Derion Chapman	Decision (unanimous)	CXF 7 - Locked and Loaded	April 29, 2017	3	5:00	Los Angeles, United States	
Loss	15–8	Chris Culley	Decision (split)	BAMMA Badbeat 20 - Saunders vs. Culley	June 10, 2016	5	5:00	Commerce, California, United States	
Win	15–7	Darren Smith Jr.	Decision (unanimous)	WSOF 28 - Moraes vs. Barajas	February 20, 2016	3	5:00	Garden Grove, California, United States	
Win	14–7	Kevin Bostick	Submission (guillotine choke)	BAMMA USA: Badbeat 17	October 2, 2015	1	0:29	Commerce, California, United States	
Win	13–7	Brandon Morris	Submission (guillotine choke)	BAMMA USA: Badbeat 16	June 26, 2015	2	1:28	Commerce, California, United States	
Win	12–7	Darren Smith	Submission (guillotine choke)	BAMMA USA: Badbeat 15	April 10, 2015	1	1:14	Commerce, California, United States	
Loss	11–7	Dominic Clark	Submission (guillotine choke)	LOP: Chaos at the Casino 5	August 10, 2014	1	1:09	Inglewood, California, United States	
Win	11–6	Dominic Gutierrez	Submission (guillotine choke)	LOP: Chaos at the Casino 4	April 12, 2014	3	1:03	Inglewood, California, United States	
Loss	10–6	Sevak Magakian	Decision (unanimous)	LOP: Chaos at the Casino 3	November 23, 2013	3	3:00	Inglewood, California, United States	
Win	10–5	Shad Smith	Submission (triangle choke)	RITC: Respect in the Cage	July 13, 2013	2	1:10	Pomona, California, United States	
Loss	9–5	Akop Stepanyan	TKO (kick to the body and punches)	Bellator XCII	March 7, 2013	3	3:55	Temecula, California, United States	
Loss	9–4	Thiago Meller	Decision (unanimous)	Samurai Pro Sports: Samurai MMA Pro 4	October 19, 2012	3	5:00	Culver City, California, United States	
Loss	9–3	Myles Jury	Submission (guillotine choke)	The Ultimate Fighter: Live Finale	June 1, 2012	1	4:03	Las Vegas, Nevada, United States	
Loss	9–2	Chris Horodecki	Decision (unanimous)	Bellator XLVII	July 23, 2011	3	5:00	Rama, Ontario, Canada	
Win	9–1	Cleber Luciano	KO (punches)	IFS 7: New Blood	April 10, 2011	2	0:22	Pico Rivera, California, United States	
Win	8–1	George Valdez	TKO (elbow and punches)	MEZ Sports: Pandemonium 3	November 19, 2010	4	3:21	Los Angeles, California, United States	
Win	7–1	Andy Morales	Decision (unanimous)	BITB: Battle in the Ballroom	June 24, 2010	3	5:00	Irvine, California, United States	
Win	6–1	Todd Willingham	Decision (unanimous)	BITB: Battle in the Ballroom	May 13, 2010	3	5:00	Irvine, California, United States	
Win	5–1	Nick Reale	Submission (guillotine choke)	LBFN 8: Long Beach Fight Night 8	April 18, 2010	1	1:35	Long Beach, California, United States	
Win	4–1	Billy Terry	TKO (punches)	BITB: Battle in the Ballroom	February 10, 2010	2	1:48	Irvine, California, United States	
Win	3–1	Todd Willingham	Decision (unanimous)	BITB: Battle in the Ballroom	December 18, 2009	3	3:00	Irvine, California, United States	
Loss	2–1	Isaac Gutierrez	Submission (rear-naked choke)	SP: Conquest in the Cage 5	November 20, 2009	2	0:18	Montebello, California, United States	
Win	2–0	Guilherme Cotliarenko	Decision (unanimous)	Battle in the Ballroom: SummerFist 3	August 15, 2009	3	5:00	Irvine, California, United States	
Win	1–0	Thor Skancke	Submission (guillotine choke)	Battle in the Ballroom: Summer Fist 3	July 17, 2009	2	2:47	Costa Mesa, California, United States	

== See also ==
- List of male mixed martial artists
