= 2013 in Bellator MMA =

Mixed martial arts events

Information
- Promotion: Bellator MMA
- First date aired: January 17, 2013
- Last date aired: November 22, 2013

2013 in Bellator MMA was the eighth installment of the Bellator MMA, which began on January 17, 2013 and ended on April 4, 2013.

Mixed martial arts tournaments were held in five weight classes and all of the champions, except the heavyweight champion, placed their titles on the line during this season.

This season marked the beginning of Bellator MMA (formerly Bellator Fighting Championships) airing on Spike TV.

== Bellator 85 ==
Bellator 85
- Date: January 17, 2013
- Venue: Bren Events Center
- City: Irvine, California
- Attendance: 3,002

Bellator 85 took place on January 17, 2013 at the Bren Events Center in Irvine, California. The event was distributed live in prime time by Spike TV. It marked the season debut of season eight.

Background

Bellator 85 was to open with a fight chosen exclusively by fans in the "Bellator: Vote For The Fight" contest. Fans could log onto Spike.com to select the two fighters they want to see square off in the first ever Bellator bout on Spike TV. The eligible fighters were all welterweights and included Paul Daley, Douglas Lima, Ben Saunders and War Machine. Initially a bout between Daley and War Machine was announced by Bellator, but it was subsequently cancelled when War Machine tore his ACL and broke his fibula.

Results

Main Card (Spike TV)
Weight Class				Method	Round	Time	Notes
Lightweight	Michael Chandler (c)	def.	Rick Hawn	Submission (rear naked choke)	2	3:07	(Note: For Lightweight Title)
Light Heavyweight	Mikhail Zayats	def.	Renato Sobral	KO (spinning back fist and punches)	1	4:49	(Note: Light Heavyweight Tournament Quarterfinal)
Light Heavyweight	Jacob Noe	def.	Seth Petruzelli	TKO (punches)	1	2:51
Featherweight	Pat Curran (c)	def.	Patricio Freire	Decision (split) (47-48, 48-47, 48-47)	5	5:00	(Note: For Featherweight Title)
Preliminary Card (Spike.com)
Light Heavyweight	Emanuel Newton	def.	Atanas Djambazov	Submission (rear naked choke)	2	2:21
Light Heavyweight	Jason Lambert	def.	Hector Ramirez	Submission (straight armbar)	1	3:59
Catchweight (165 lb)	J.J. Ambrose	def.	Brian Warren	Submission (guillotine choke)	2	0:50
Lightweight	Savant Young	def.	Mike Guymon	KO (punch)	2	0:48
Welterweight	Joe Williams	def.	Jamie Yager	TKO (strikes)	1	4:02
Featherweight	Aaron Miller	def.	Joe Camacho	Decision (unanimous) (30-27, 30-27, 30-27)	3	5:00
Featherweight	Cleber Luciano	def.	Mario Navarro	Decision (unanimous) (30-27, 30-27, 30-27)	3	5:00

== Bellator 86 ==
Bellator 86
- Date: January 24, 2013
- Venue: WinStar World Casino
- City: Thackerville, Oklahoma
- Attendance: 1,288

Bellator 86 took place on January 24, 2013 at WinStar World Casino in Thackerville, Oklahoma. The event was distributed live in prime time by Spike TV.

Background

Bellator 86 featured the opening round of the Season Eight Welterweight Tournament.

The card also featured the Bellator debut of Muhammed Lawal, against veteran Polish fighter Przemyslaw "Misiek" Mysiala.

Results

Main Card (Spike TV)
Weight Class				Method	Round	Time	Notes
Welterweight	Ben Askren (c)	def.	Karl Amoussou	TKO (doctor stoppage)	3	5:00	(Note: For Welterweight Title)
Light Heavyweight	Muhammed Lawal	def.	Przemyslaw Mysiala	TKO (punches)	1	3:52	(Note: Light Heavyweight Tournament Quarterfinal)
Welterweight	Douglas Lima	def.	Michail Tsarev	TKO (leg kicks)	2	1:44	(Note: Welterweight Tournament Quarterfinal)
Welterweight	Ben Saunders	def.	Koffi Adzitso	Decision (unanimous) (30-27, 30-27, 30-27)	3	5:00
Preliminary Card (Spike.com)
Welterweight	Brent Weedman	def.	Marius Zaromskis	Decision (unanimous) (29-27, 29-27, 29-27)	3	5:00	(Note: Zarokskis docked 1 point for illegal knees)
Welterweight	Raul Amaya	def.	José Gomes	TKO (punches)	1	3:12
Catchweight (140 lb)	Jason Sampson	def.	Chris Pham	Submission (armbar)	3	4:55
Lightweight	Damon Jackson	def.	Zach Church	Submission (rear-naked choke)	2	2:43
Middleweight	Cortez Coleman	def.	Matt Jones	Decision (unanimous) (29-28, 29-28, 29-28)	3	5:00
Unaired
Featherweight	Hunter Tucker	def.	Javier Obregon	Submission (guillotine choke)	2	3:17

== Bellator 87 ==
Bellator 87
- Date: January 31, 2013
- Venue: Soaring Eagle Casino
- City: Mount Pleasant, Michigan
- Attendance: 850

Bellator 87 took place on January 31, 2013 at Soaring Eagle Casino in Mount Pleasant, Michigan. The event was distributed live in prime time by Spike TV.

Background

Bellator 87 featured fights the quarterfinals of the Season Eight Lightweight Tournament.

Patricky Freire was originally supposed to face Guillaume DeLorenzi in the main event. However, on the day of the weigh ins Freire was pulled from the card due to an "undisclosed injury" and replaced by Saad Awad.

Results

Main Card (Spike TV)
Weight Class				Method	Round	Time	Notes
Lightweight	David Rickels	def.	Lloyd Woodard	Decision (unanimous) (29-28, 29-28, 29-28)	3	5:00	(Note: Lightweight Tournament Quarterfinal)
Lightweight	Will Brooks	def.	Ricardo Tirloni	Decision (unanimous) (30-27, 30-27, 30-27)	3	5:00
Lightweight	Saad Awad	def.	Guillaume DeLorenzi	TKO (punches)	1	0:31
Lightweight	Alexander Sarnavskiy	def.	Thiago Michel	Submission (rear-naked choke)	2	3:43
Preliminary Card (Spike.com)
Lightweight	Jason Fischer	def.	Sevak Magakian	Submission (rear-naked choke)	1	3:37
Heavyweight	Karl Etherington	def.	Jason Fish	Verbal submission (strikes)	1	3:45
Catchweight (165 lb)	Amir Khillah	def.	John Schulz	Submission (rear-naked choke)	1	4:34
Lightweight	J. P. Reese	def.	David Shepherd	Decision (unanimous) (29-28, 30-27, 30-27)	3	5:00
Welterweight	Sam Quito	def.	Ben Lagman	Submission (kneebar)	1	3:54
Catchweight (139 lb)	Tony Zelinski	def.	Nick Kirk	Decision (split) (29-28, 28-29, 30-27)	3	5:00

== Bellator 88 ==
Bellator 88
- Date: February 7, 2013
- Venue: Arena at Gwinnett Center
- City: Duluth, Georgia
- Attendance: 4,267

Bellator 88 took place on February 7, 2013 at The Arena at Gwinnett Center in Duluth, Georgia. The event was distributed live in prime time by Spike TV.

Background

Bellator 88 featured the opening round of the Season Eight Featherweight Tournament as well as a title fight for the vacant Middleweight title.

A middleweight bout between Kelvin Tiller and Dave Vitkay was originally announced for this card, but failed to materialize.

Results

Main Card (Spike TV)
Weight Class				Method	Round	Time	Notes
Middleweight	Alexander Shlemenko	def.	Maiquel Falcão	KO (punches)	2	2:18	(Note: For the vacant Middleweight Title)
Featherweight	Marlon Sandro	def.	Akop Stepanyan	Decision (majority) (28-28, 29-27, 29-27)	3	5:00	(Note: Featherweight Tournament Quarterfinal)
Featherweight	Mike Richman	def.	Mitch Jackson	TKO (head kick and punches)	1	4:57
Featherweight	Alexandre Bezerra	def.	Genair da Silva	Submission (armbar)	1	1:40
Preliminary Card (Spike.com)
Featherweight	Magomedrasul Khasbulaev	def.	Fabricio Guerreiro	Submission (arm triangle choke)	2	1:15
Catchweight (159 lb)	Joe Elmore	def.	Jerrid Burke	KO (punch)	2	4:11
Catchweight (152 lb)	Ronnie Rogers	def.	Shane Crenshaw	Decision (unanimous) (29-28, 29-28, 29-28)	3	5:00
Catchweight (159 lb)	Clay Harvison	def.	Ururahy Rodrigues	TKO (knee)	3	3:34
Featherweight	George Hickman	def.	Stephen Upchurch	Submission (rear-naked choke)	1	2:19

== Bellator 89 ==
Bellator 89
- Date: February 14, 2013
- Venue: Bojangles' Coliseum
- City: Charlotte, North Carolina

Bellator 89 took place on February 14, 2013 at The Bojangles' Coliseum, in Charlotte, North Carolina. The event was distributed live in prime time by Spike TV.

Background

Bellator 89 featured the opening round of the Middleweight tournament.

The event also featured the first defense for Eduardo Dantas of the Bantamweight Title since he won it from Zach Makovsky in May 2012. It marked the first time two training partners and friends have fought for a title in the Bellator promotion.

Results

Main Card (Spike TV)
Weight Class				Method	Round	Time	Notes
Bantamweight	Eduardo Dantas (c)	def.	Marcos Galvão	KO (punches)	2	3:01	(Note: For Bantamweight Title)
Middleweight	Dan Cramer	def.	Brian Rogers	Decision (unanimous) (29-28, 30-27, 29-28)	3	5:00	(Note: Middleweight Tournament Quarterfinal)
Middleweight	Brett Cooper	def.	Norman Paraisy	Decision (unanimous) (30-27, 30-27, 30-27)	3	5:00
Middleweight	Doug Marshall	def.	Andreas Spang	KO (punch)	1	3:03
Preliminary Card (Spike.com)
Heavyweight	David Mejia	def.	Mont McCullens	TKO (punches)	1	4:15
Middleweight	Aaron Johnson	def.	Brennan Ward	Submission (armbar)	1	0:15
Middleweight	Sultan Aliev	def.	Mikkel Parlo	Decision (unanimous) (29-28, 29-28, 29-28)	3	5:00
Middleweight	Joe Pacheco	def.	Kyle Bolt	TKO (strikes)	2	4:02
Welterweight	Johnny Buck	def.	Chris Mierzwiak	Decision (unanimous) (29-28, 29-28, 29-28)	3	5:00
Bantamweight	Mike Maldonado	def.	Tim Goodwin	Decision (unanimous) (30-27, 29-28, 30-27)	3	5:00

== Bellator 90 ==
Bellator 90
- Date: February 21, 2013
- Venue: Maverik Center
- City: West Valley City, Utah

Bellator XC took place on February 21, 2013 at the Maverik Center in West Valley City, Utah. The event was distributed live in prime time by Spike TV.

Background

Bellator 90 featured the finals of the Bellator Season 7 Featherweight Tournament.

The card also featured the Light Heavyweight and Welterweight tournament semifinals.

Results

Main Card (Spike TV)
Weight Class				Method	Round	Time	Notes
Featherweight	Shahbulat Shamhalaev	def.	Rad Martinez	KO (punch)	2	2:12	(Note: Bellator Season 7 Featherweight Tournament Final)
Light Heavyweight	Emanuel Newton	def.	Muhammed Lawal	KO (spinning backfist)	1	2:35	(Note: Light Heavyweight Tournament Semi Final)
Welterweight	Douglas Lima	def.	Bryan Baker	KO (punch)	1	2:34	(Note: Welterweight Tournament Semi Final)
Light Heavyweight	Mikhail Zayats	def.	Jacob Noe	Submission (armbar)	1	3:38
Preliminary Card (Spike.com)
Welterweight	Ben Saunders	def.	Raul Amaya	KO (head kick)	1	2:56
Catchweight (137 lb)	Travis Marx	def.	Chase Beebe	Decision (unanimous) (30-27, 30-27, 30-27)	3	5:00
Welterweight	Jesse Juarez	def.	Jordan Smith	Decision (split) (29-28, 28-29, 30-27)	3	5:00
Lightweight	Sean Powers	def.	Dave Allred	Submission (rear naked choke)	3	2:10
Middleweight	Lionel Lanham	def.	Joe Rodriguez	TKO (punches)	1	0:49
Featherweight	Shanon Slack	def.	Josh Tyler	Submission (Peruvian necktie)	3	1:56

== Bellator 91 ==
Bellator 91
- Date: February 28, 2013
- Venue: Santa Ana Star Center
- City: Rio Rancho, New Mexico

Bellator 91 took place on February 28, 2013 at the Santa Ana Star Center in Rio Rancho, New Mexico. The event was distributed live in prime time by Spike TV.

Background

Bellator 91 featured the first title defense by Light Heavyweight champion Christian M'Pumbu, despite having won the belt in May 2011.

Alexander Sarnavskiy was originally scheduled to face David Rickels in the semifinals. However, Sarnavskiy fractured his hand during his first fight and had to withdraw from the tournament. He was replaced with Jason Fischer.

Results

Main Card (Spike TV)
Weight Class				Method	Round	Time	Notes
Light Heavyweight	Attila Vegh	def.	Christian M'Pumbu (c)	Decision (unanimous) (48-47, 49-46, 50-45)	5	5:00	(Note: For Light Heavyweight Title)
Lightweight	Saad Awad	def.	Will Brooks	TKO (punches)	1	0:43	(Note: Lightweight Tournament Semi Final)
Lightweight	David Rickels	def.	Jason Fischer	Decision (unanimous) (29-28, 30-27, 30-27)	3	5:00
Preliminary Card (Spike.com)
Women's Bantamweight	Holly Holm	def.	Katie Merrill	TKO (punches)	2	3:02
Lightweight	Blas Avena	def.	Lenny Lovato	TKO (punch)	1	1:40
Featherweight	Andres Quintana	def.	Russell Wilson	TKO (knees & punches)	3	0:32
Bantamweight	Ed West	def.	Josh Montoya	KO (head kick)	2	2:51
Bantamweight	Adrian Cruz	def.	Nick Gonzalez	Submission (scarf hold armlock)	2	3:00
Heavyweight	Josh Appelt	def.	Josh Lanier	TKO (punches)	2	0:16
Catchweight (187 lb)	Brennan Ward	def.	Yair Moguel	Submission (rear naked choke)	1	0:57

== Bellator 92 ==
Bellator 92
- Date: March 7, 2013
- Venue: Pechanga Resort and Casino
- City: Temecula, California

Bellator 92 took place on March 7, 2013 at the Pechanga Resort and Casino in Temecula, California. The event was distributed live in prime time by Spike TV.

Background

The card was originally scheduled to have the season 7 Lightweight tournament final between Dave Jansen and Marcin Held. However, Held was injured and the fight was delayed two weeks to Bellator 93.

Results

Main Card (Spike TV)
Weight Class				Method	Round	Time	Notes
Featherweight	Magomedrasul Khasbulaev	def.	Marlon Sandro	TKO (punches)	3	2:38	(Note: Featherweight Tournament Semi Final)
Middleweight	Doug Marshall	def.	Sultan Aliev	Decision (split) (27-30, 29-28, 29-28)	3	5:00	(Note: Middleweight Tournament Semi Final)
Middleweight	Brett Cooper	def.	Dan Cramer	TKO (punches)	3	3:19
Featherweight	Mike Richman	def.	Alexandre Bezerra	Decision (split) (29-28, 28-29, 29-28)	3	5:00
Preliminary Card (Spike.com)
Lightweight	Akop Stepanyan	def.	Chris Saunders	TKO (spinning back kick & punches)	3	3:55
Middleweight	Keith Berry	def.	Richard Rigmaden	Submission (kimura)	1	1:31
Heavyweight	Josh Appelt	def.	Manny Lara	Decision (unanimous) (30-24, 30-24, 30-24)	3	5:00	(Note: Lara docked 3 points (1 for an illegal knee, 2 for a groin shot))
Featherweight	Aaron Miller	def.	Shad Smith	Decision (unanimous) (30-27, 30-27, 30-27)	3	5:00
Light Heavyweight	Brandon Halsey	def.	Rocky Ramirez	Technical submission (arm-triangle choke)	3	0:50
Unaired
Welterweight	Ricky Legere	def.	Sabah Homasi	Submission (rear-naked choke)	2	2:52
Featherweight	Nick Piedmont	def.	Cleber Luciano	TKO (punches)	1	0:55

== Bellator 93 ==
Bellator 93
- Date: March 21, 2013
- Venue: Androscoggin Bank Colisée
- City: Lewiston, Maine

Bellator 93 took place on March 21, 2013 at the Androscoggin Bank Colisée in Lewiston, Maine. The event was distributed live in prime time by Spike TV and featured the Season Seven Lightweight Tournament Final.

Background

Ben Saunders and Douglas Lima were scheduled to have a rematch on this card to decide the winner of the Bellator Season 8 Welterweight Tournament Final. However, Lima broke his hand and the match was delayed until later in the year.

Heavyweights Brett Rogers and Eric Prindle were scheduled to face each other on this card. However, the week leading up to the show it was announced that Prindle had pulled out of the bout due to an injury.

Jon Lemke defeated Jesse Erickson to kick off the event for the night and marked Bellator's 800th Fight in the history of the company.

Results

Main Card (Spike TV)
Weight Class				Method	Round	Time	Notes
Lightweight	Dave Jansen	def.	Marcin Held	Decision (unanimous) (29-28, 29-28, 29-28)	3	5:00	(Note: Bellator Season 7 Lightweight Tournament Final)
Heavyweight	Ryan Martinez	def.	Travis Wiuff	KO (punches)	1	0:18
Welterweight	Marcus Davis	vs	Waachiim Spiritwolf	NC (knee to the groin)	1	3:05
Preliminary Card (Spike.com)
Middleweight	Dave Vitkay	def.	Jesse Peterson	Technical submission (guillotine choke)	1	0:18
Welterweight	Michael Page	def.	Ryan Sanders	KO (punch)	1	0:10
Middleweight	Jason Butcher	def.	Jack Hermansson	Submission (triangle choke)	1	2:24
Light Heavyweight	Mike Mucitelli	def.	Brent Dillingham	Submission (armbar)	1	2:48
Middleweight	Joe Pacheco	def.	Pierre Pierry	Submission (keylock)	1	1:54
Featherweight	Vince Murdock	def.	John Raio	TKO (elbow & punches)	3	4:01
Lightweight	Jon Lemke	def.	Jesse Erickson	TKO (punches)	1	2:50

== Bellator 94 ==
Bellator 94
- Date: March 28, 2013
- Venue: USF Sun Dome
- City: Tampa, Florida

Bellator 94 took place on March 28, 2013 at the USF Sun Dome in Tampa, Florida. The event was distributed live in prime time by Spike TV and featured the Light Heavyweight and Lightweight Tournament Finals.

Background

Tony Fryklund made his return to mixed martial arts on this card after a 6-year absence. His last fight was a losing effort against Cung Le at a Strikeforce event in June 2007.

A bout between middleweights Ivan Devalle and Rory Shallcross was originally announced for this card, but failed to materialize.

Results

Main Card (Spike TV)
Weight Class				Method	Round	Time	Notes
Light Heavyweight	Emanuel Newton	def.	Mikhail Zayats	Decision (unanimous) (29-28, 29-28, 29-28)	3	5:00	(Note: Bellator Season 8 Light Heavyweight Tournament Final)
Lightweight	David Rickels	def.	Saad Awad	TKO (punches)	2	5:00	(Note: Bellator Season 8 Lightweight Tournament Final)
Middleweight	Luis Melo	def.	Trey Houston	Submission (arm triangle choke)	3	1:09
Bantamweight	Rodrigo Lima	def.	Ronnie Mann	Decision (unanimous) (30-27, 30-27, 30-27)	3	5:00
Preliminary Card (Spike.com)
Welterweight	Julien Williams	def.	Kenny Moss	Submission (guillotine choke)	1	3:19
Heavyweight	Augusto Sakai	def.	Rob Horton	KO (knee)	2	4:01
Women's Strawweight	Jessica Aguilar	def.	Patricia Vidonic	Decision (split) (29-28, 28-29, 29-28)	3	5:00
Featherweight	Joe Taimanglo	def.	Ronnie Rogers	Submission (north/south choke)	2	0:33
Lightweight	James Edson Berto	def.	Bruno Carvalho	Submission (heel hook)	1	1:27
Catchweight (157 lb)	Patrick Cenoble	vs.	Tony Fryklund	Draw (29-27, 27-29, 28-28)	3	5:00	(Note: Cenoble was docked 1 pt. in round 2 for grabbing the fence.)
Women's Strawweight	Felice Herrig	def.	Heather Jo Clark	Decision (split) (28-29, 29-28, 29-28)	3	5:00

== Bellator 95 ==
Bellator 95
- Date: April 4, 2013
- Venue: Revel Casino
- City: Atlantic City, New Jersey

Bellator 95 took place on April 4, 2013 at the Revel Casino in Atlantic City, New Jersey. The event was distributed live in prime time by Spike TV.

Background

The event was initially scheduled to feature a championship match for the Featherweight Title between Pat Curran and Daniel Mason-Straus. However, on February 26, it was announced that Straus had broken his hand and had to pull out of the fight. On February 27, it was announced that recent tournament winner Shahbulat Shamhalaev would advance with his title shot and he faced Curran on this card.

The card was to feature the #1-ranked 125-pound female fighter according to the Unified Women's MMA Rankings Jessica Eye vs. Munah Holland in a Women's Flyweight bout, but Eye had to withdraw due to a back injury.

Results

Main Card (Spike TV)
Weight Class				Method	Round	Time	Notes
Featherweight	Pat Curran (c)	def.	Shahbulat Shamhalaev	Technical submission (guillotine choke)	1	2:38	(Note: For Featherweight Title)
Featherweight	Frodo Khasbulaev	def.	Mike Richman	Decision (unanimous) (30-27, 30-27, 30-27)	3	5:00	(Note: Bellator Season 8 Featherweight Tournament Final)
Middleweight	Doug Marshall	def.	Brett Cooper	KO (punch)	1	3:39	(Note: Bellator Season 8 Middleweight Tournament Final)
Welterweight	Rick Hawn	def.	Karo Parisyan	KO (punches)	2	1:55
Preliminary Card (Spike.com)
Welterweight	Lyman Good	def.	Dante Rivera	Decision (unanimous) (29-28, 30-27, 30-27)	3	5:00
Catchweight (173 lb)	Sam Oropeza	def.	Shedrick Goodridge	TKO (strikes)	2	4:22
Catchweight (188 lb)	Tom DeBlass	def.	Carlos Brooks	TKO (doctor stoppage)	2	5:00
Lightweight	Phillipe Nover	def.	Darrell Horcher	Decision (unanimous) (29-28, 30-27, 30-27)	3	5:00
Catchweight (140 lb)	Jimmie Rivera	def.	Brian Kelleher	Decision (unanimous) (30-27, 29-28, 29-28)	3	5:00
Featherweight	Will Martinez	def.	Michael Hess	KO (punches)	1	4:15
Featherweight	Kevin Roddy	def.	Brylan Van Artsdalen	Submission (armbar)	2	1:04
Light Heavyweight	Liam McGeary	def.	Anton Talamantes	TKO (elbows and punches)	1	1:18

== Tournaments ==
=== Light Heavyweight tournament bracket ===
Quarterfinals
(United States) Emanuel Newton	SUB
(Bulgaria) Atanas Djambazov	2
(United States) Muhammed Lawal	TKO
(Poland) Przemyslaw Mysiala	1
(Russia) Mikhail Zayats	TKO
(Brazil) Renato Sobral	1
(United States) Jacob Noe	TKO
(United States) Seth Petruzelli	1

Semifinals
(United States) Emanuel Newton	KO
(United States) Muhammed Lawal	1
(Russia) Mikhail Zayats	SUB
(United States) Jacob Noe	1

Finals
(United States) Emanuel Newton	UD
(Russia) Mikhail Zayats	3

=== Middleweight tournament bracket ===
Quarterfinals
(United States) Doug Marshall	KO
(Sweden) Andreas Spang	1
(Russia) Sultan Aliev	UD
(Denmark) Mikkel Parlo	3
(United States) Brett Cooper	UD
(France) Norman Paraisy	3
(United States) Dan Cramer	UD
(United States) Brian Rogers	3

Semifinals
(United States) Doug Marshall	SD
(Russia) Sultan Aliev	3
(United States) Brett Cooper	TKO
(United States) Dan Cramer	3

Finals
(United States) Doug Marshall	KO
(United States) Brett Cooper	1

=== Welterweight tournament bracket ===
Quarterfinals
(Brazil) Douglas Lima	TKO
(Russia) Michail Tsarev	2
(United States) Brent Weedman	UD
(Lithuania) Marius Zaromskis	3
(United States) Ben Saunders	UD
(United States) Koffi Adzitso	3
(United States) Raul Amaya	TKO
(Brazil) José Gomes	1

Semifinals
(Brazil) Douglas Lima	TKO
(United States) Bryan Baker (Note: Replaces Brent Weedman due to an injury)	1
(United States) Ben Saunders	KO
(United States) Raul Amaya	1

Finals
(Brazil) Douglas Lima	KO
(United States) Ben Saunders	2

=== Lightweight tournament bracket ===
Quarterfinals
(United States) David Rickels	UD
(United States) Lloyd Woodard	3
(Russia) Alexander Sarnavskiy	SUB
(Brazil) Thiago Michel	2
(United States) Saad Awad	TKO
(Canada) Guillaume DeLorenzi	1
(United States) Will Brooks	UD
(Brazil) Ricardo Tirloni	3

Semifinals
(United States) David Rickels	UD
(United States) Jason Fischer (Note: Replaces Alexander Sarnavskiy due to an injury)	3
(United States) Saad Awad	TKO
(United States) Will Brooks	1

Finals
(United States) David Rickels	TKO
(United States) Saad Awad	2

=== Featherweight tournament bracket ===
Quarterfinals
(Russia) Magomedrasul Khasbulaev	SUB
(Brazil) Fabricio Guerreiro	2
(Brazil) Marlon Sandro	MD
(Russia) Akop Stepanyan	3
(United States) Mike Richman	TKO
(United States) Mitch Jackson	1
(Brazil) Alexandre Bezerra	SUB
(Brazil) Genair da Silva	1

Semifinals
(Russia) Magomedrasul Khasbulaev	TKO
(Brazil) Marlon Sandro	3
(United States) Mike Richman	UD
(Brazil) Alexandre Bezerra	3

Finals
(Russia) Magomedrasul Khasbulaev	DD
(United States) Mike Richman	3

== Bellator 96 ==
Bellator 96
- Date: June 19, 2013
- Venue: Winstar World Casino
- City: Thackerville, Oklahoma

Bellator 96 took place on June 19, 2013 at the Winstar World Casino in Thackerville, Oklahoma. The event was distributed live in prime time by Spike TV. It marked the season debut of the 2013 summer series. Randy Couture, Frank Shamrock, Greg Jackson and Joe Warren took part in commentary.

Background

Bellator 96 featured the opening round of the 2013 Summer Series Heavyweight and Light Heavyweight tournaments.

This event served as the lead in for the debut of Bellator's new reality TV series, Fight Master: Bellator MMA.

Michael Chandler was expected to defend his Lightweight Title against Dave Jansen on this card. However, on June 2, it was announced that Jansen had to pull out of the bout due to an injury.

Vinicius Queiroz was originally scheduled to face Richard Hale in the heavyweight tournament. Queiroz, however, suffered a knee injury and was replaced Ryan Martinez.

Both Derek Campos and Keith Berry missed weight for their fights; as a result, both fighters forfeited a portion of their purses to their opponents and the matches were changed to catchweight.

Both Seth Petruzelli & Renato Sobral retired from MMA competition after this event.

Results

Main Card (Spike TV)
Weight Class				Method	Round	Time	Notes
Light Heavyweight	Muhammed Lawal	def.	Seth Petruzelli	KO (punch)	1	1:35	(Note: Light Heavyweight Tournament Semifinal)
Light Heavyweight	Jacob Noe	def.	Renato Sobral	TKO (referee stoppage)	3	3:32
Heavyweight	Vitaly Minakov	def.	Ron Sparks	TKO (punches)	1	0:32	(Note: Heavyweight Tournament Semifinal)
Welterweight	War Machine	def.	Blas Avena	TKO (punches)	1	3:55
Preliminary Card (Spike.com)
Lightweight	Damon Jackson	def.	Keith Miner	TKO (punches)	1	2:00
Heavyweight	Raphael Butler	def.	Jeremiah O'Neal	TKO (punches & elbows)	1	2:57
Heavyweight	Ryan Martinez	def.	Richard Hale	KO (punches)	1	2:19
Light Heavyweight	Brandon Halsey	def.	Joe Yager	Decision (split) (30-28, 28-30, 30-28)	3	5:00	(Note: Yager deducted 1 point for a groin kick.)
Catchweight (159 lb)	Derek Campos	def.	Brandon Girtz	Decision (unanimous) (29-28, 29-28, 29-28)	3	5:00
Bantamweight	Justin McNally	def.	Steven Artoff	Verbal submission (inverted triangle armbar)	1	2:44
Unaired
Featherweight	Chas Skelly	def.	Jarrod Card	Decision (unanimous) (29-28, 29-28, 29-28)	3	5:00
Bantamweight	Mike Maldonado	def.	Chavous Smith	Submission (rear-naked choke)	1	2:27
Catchweight (186 lb)	Keith Berry	def.	Cortez Coleman	Decision (split) (28-29, 29-28, 29-28)	3	5:00

== Bellator 97 ==
Bellator 97
- Date: July 31, 2013
- Venue: Santa Ana Star Center
- City: Rio Rancho, New Mexico

Bellator 97 took place on July 31, 2013 at the Santa Ana Star Center in Rio Rancho, New Mexico. The event was distributed live in prime time by Spike TV.

Background

The card featured Ben Askren's fourth title defense of the Bellator Welterweight Championship and Michael Chandler's second defense of the Bellator Lightweight Championship.

The card also featured the Heavyweight and Light Heavyweight Tournament Finals and Bantamweight Tournament Semifinals.

Douglas Lima and Ben Saunders were scheduled to fight in order to decide the next contender for the Welterweight title. However, on June 11, it was announced that Lima had to pull out of the bout due to an injury.

Patricio Freire was originally scheduled to face The Ultimate Fighter veteran Rob Emerson. However, on July 12, it was revealed Emerson had to withdraw due to injury and was replaced by Jared Downing.

The live airing featured the announcement of Bellator's first pay per view event for November 2, 2013 that will be headlined by Tito Ortiz versus Quinton Jackson.

Results

Main Card (Spike TV)
Weight Class				Method	Round	Time	Notes
Lightweight	Michael Chandler (c)	def.	David Rickels	KO (punches)	1	0:44	(Note: Lightweight Title Fight)
Welterweight	Ben Askren (c)	def.	Andrey Koreshkov	TKO (punches)	4	2:58	(Note: Welterweight Title Fight)
Light Heavyweight	Muhammed Lawal	def.	Jacob Noe	TKO (punches)	3	2:51	(Note: Light Heavyweight Tournament Final)
Heavyweight	Vitaly Minakov	def.	Ryan Martinez	TKO (punches)	3	4:02	(Note: Heavyweight Tournament Final)
Featherweight	Patricio Freire	def.	Jared Downing	TKO (punches)	2	0:54
Preliminary Card (Spike.com)
Lightweight	Will Brooks	def.	Cris Leyva	TKO (punches)	3	2:20
Bantamweight	Rafael Silva	def.	Rodrigo Lima	Submission (rear naked choke)	3	2:03	(Note: Bantamweight Tournament Semifinal)
Bantamweight	Anthony Leone	def.	Frank Baca	Submission (rear naked choke)	3	1:07
Lightweight	Bubba Jenkins	def.	Mike Barreras	TKO (punches)	2	1:05
Catchweight (151 lb)	Javier Palacios	def.	Richard Jacques	Decision (unanimous)	3	5:00
Middleweight	Jeremy Kimball	def.	Keith Berry	KO (punches)	2	1:45
Bantamweight	Adrian Cruz	def.	Felipe Chavez	TKO (punches)	2	0:00
Catchweight (149 lb)	Donald Sanchez	def.	Cliff Wright	Decision (split)	3	5:00
Bantamweight	Shawn Bunch	def.	Russell Wilson	Decision (split)	3	5:00

== Tournaments ==
=== Heavyweight tournament bracket ===
Semifinals
(Russia) Vitaly Minakov	TKO
(United States) Ron Sparks	3
(United States) Ryan Martinez	KO
(United States) Richard Hale	1

Finals
(Russia) Vitaly Minakov	TKO
(United States) Ryan Martinez	3

=== Light Heavyweight tournament bracket ===
Semifinals
(United States) Muhammed Lawal	KO
(United States) Seth Petruzelli	1
(United States) Jacob Noe	TKO
(Brazil) Renato Sobral	3

Finals
(United States) Muhammed Lawal	TKO
(United States) Jacob Noe	3

=== Bantamweight tournament bracket ===
Semifinals
(Brazil) Rafael Silva	SUB
(Brazil) Rodrigo Lima	3
(United States) Anthony Leone	SUB
(United States) Frank Baca	3

Finals
(Brazil) Rafael Silva	UD
(United States) Anthony Leone	3

== Bellator 98 ==
Bellator 98
- Date: September 7, 2013
- Venue: Mohegan Sun Arena
- City: Uncasville, Connecticut

Bellator 98 took place on September 7, 2013 at the Mohegan Sun Arena in Uncasville, Connecticut. The event aired live in prime time on Spike TV. It marked the season debut of season nine.

Background

Bellator 98 was supposed to feature a Bellator Middleweight Championship bout between Alexander Shlemenko and Season 8 Middleweight Tournament Winner Doug Marshall. However, on August 19 Marshall was forced out of the title bout due to an injury and was replaced by Season 8 Middleweight Tournament Runner Up Brett Cooper.

The Fight Master: Bellator MMA finale between Joe Riggs and Mike Bronzoulis was expected to take place at this event. However, on September 3, it was revealed Riggs has sustained a significant eye injury and the bout was postponed indefinitely. The fight was later scheduled for Bellator 106.

Dan Cramer was originally scheduled to face Perry Filkins in the Middleweight tournament opening round, but withdrew from the match and was replaced by Jeremy Kimball.

Joe Warren was scheduled to face Nick Kirk on this card. However, on the Friday before the event, Warren was removed for undisclosed medical reasons. The fight was later scheduled for Bellator 101

Andreas Spang was originally scheduled to face Justin Torrey in the Middleweight tournament opening round, but was declared unfit to fight by the Mohegan Tribe Department of Athletic Regulation. He was replaced by Brennan Ward, who originally was supposed to face Dave Vitkay on the preliminary card.

Andrew Calandrelli was originally scheduled to face Ryan Quinn, but was removed from the card and replaced by Brylan Van Artsdalen.

The card featured all the Middleweight Tournament Quarterfinal bouts.

Results

Main Card (Spike TV)
Weight Class				Method	Round	Time	Notes
Middleweight	Alexander Shlemenko (c)	def.	Brett Cooper	Decision (unanimous) (48-47, 48-47, 48-47)	5	5:00	(Note: For Middleweight Championship)
Middleweight	Mikkel Parlo	def.	Brian Rogers	Decision (unanimous) (30-27, 30-26, 30-26)	3	5:00	(Note: Middleweight Tournament Quarterfinal)
Middleweight	Jason Butcher	def.	Giva Santana	TKO (punches)	2	1:12
Middleweight	Brennan Ward	def.	Justin Torrey	TKO (punches)	2	3:28
Middleweight	Perry Filkins	def.	Jeremy Kimball	Submission (rear naked choke)	3	4:18
Lightweight	Derek Anderson	def.	Patricky Freire	Decision (unanimous) (29-28, 29-28, 29-28)	3	5:00
Preliminary Card (Spike.com)
Light Heavyweight	Mike Mucitelli	vs.	Jeff Nader	No Contest	1	1:30	(Note: Mucitelli inadvertently poked Nader in the eye in round one.)
Heavyweight	Josh Diekmann	def.	Parker Porter	TKO (strikes)	1	1:12
Lightweight	Ryan Quinn	def.	Brylan Van Artsdalen	Submission (arm triangle)	1	2:34
Featherweight	Matt Bessette	def.	Nick Piedmont	TKO (punches)	1	1:41
Featherweight	Rico Disciullo	def.	Glenn Allair	KO (strikes)	1	1:21

== Bellator 99 ==
Bellator 99
- Date: September 13, 2013
- Venue: Pechanga Resort & Casino
- City: Temecula, California

Bellator 99 took place on September 13, 2013 at the Pechanga Resort & Casino in Temecula, California. The event aired live in prime time on Spike TV.

Background

Bellator 99 featured the Featherweight Tournament Quarterfinal bouts.

Vladimir Matyushenko was originally scheduled to face for Bellator Light Heavyweight champion Christian M'Pumbu. However, on August 18, it was announced that M'Pumbu had a hand injury and he was replaced by Houston Alexander.

Shahbulat Shamhalaev was originally scheduled to face Akop Stepanyan on this card. However, on September 9, it was revealed Shamhalaev was forced to pull out of the tournament due to his ailing father. He was replaced by Justin Wilcox.

A bantamweight bout between Derek Loffer and Mario Navarro was initially planned for this card, but cancelled for unknown reasons.

Results

Main Card (Spike TV)
Weight Class				Method	Round	Time	Notes
Featherweight	Patricio Freire	def.	Diego Nunes	KO (punch)	1	1:19	(Note: Featherweight Tournament Quarterfinal)
Featherweight	Fabricio Guerreiro	def.	Desmond Green	Decision (unanimous) (29-28, 29-28, 29-28)	3	5:00
Light Heavyweight	Vladimir Matyushenko	def.	Houston Alexander	Decision (unanimous) (29-28, 30-27, 30-27)	3	5:00
Featherweight	Justin Wilcox	def.	Akop Stepanyan	Technical submission (rear naked choke)	2	2:20
Featherweight	Joe Taimanglo	def.	Andrew Fisher	Decision (unanimous) (29-28, 30-27, 30-27)	3	5:00
Preliminary Card (Spike.com)
Heavyweight	Blagoi Ivanov	def.	Manny Lara	Submission (guillotine choke)	1	1:17
Featherweight	Goiti Yamauchi	def.	Musa Toliver	Submission (rear naked choke)	1	1:01
Welterweight	Gavin Sterritt	def.	Andy Murad	Decision (split) (29-28, 28-29, 29-28)	3	5:00
Light Heavyweight	Hector Ramirez	def.	Savo Kosic	Decision (unanimous) (30-27, 30-27, 30-27)	3	5:00
Unaired
Light Heavyweight	Virgil Zwicker	def.	Nick Moghaddam	TKO (punches)	1	3:22

== Bellator 100 ==
Bellator 100
- Date: September 20, 2013
- Venue: Grand Canyon University Arena
- City: Phoenix, Arizona

Bellator 100 took place on September 20, 2013 at the Grand Canyon University Arena in Phoenix, Arizona. The event aired live in prime time on Spike TV.

Background

Bellator 100 featured the Season 9 Welterweight Tournament Quarterfinal bouts and the Season 8 Welterweight finals.

Matt Riddle was originally scheduled to face Luis Melo on this card, but pulled out due to a cracked rib. He was replaced by Ron Keslar.

Mark Scanlon was originally scheduled to face Herman Terrado on this card, but pulled out due to an injury and was replaced by Rick Hawn

Results

Main Card (Spike TV)
Weight Class				Method	Round	Time	Notes
Welterweight	Douglas Lima	def.	Ben Saunders	KO (head kick)	2	4:33	(Note: Season 8 Welterweight Tournament Final)
Welterweight	War Machine	def.	Vaughn Anderson	Technical Submission (rear naked choke)	2	4:01	(Note: Welterweight Tournament Quarterfinal)
Welterweight	Rick Hawn	def.	Herman Terrado	Decision (unanimous) (30-27, 29-28, 29-28)	3	5:00
Welterweight	Ron Keslar	def.	Luis Melo	Decision (split) (29-28, 28-29, 29-28)	3	5:00
Welterweight	Brent Weedman	def.	Justin Baesman	Submission (armbar)	1	3:20
Preliminary Card (Spike.com)
Bantamweight	Travis Marx	def.	Brandon Bender	TKO (strikes)	2	4:28	(Note: Bantamweight Tournament Semifinal)
Lightweight	LaRue Burley	def.	Bubba Jenkins	TKO (punches)	3	3:40
Light Heavyweight	Clifford Starks	def.	Joe Yager	Decision (unanimous) (29-28, 30-27, 30-27)	3	5:00
Light Heavyweight	Liam McGeary	def.	Beau Tribolet	KO (punches)	1	0:27
Heavyweight	Siala-Mou Siliga	def.	Dan Charles	TKO (punches)	3	1:26
Welterweight	Adam McDonough	def.	Johnny Buck	TKO (strikes)	1	4:51
Unaired
Lightweight	Efraín Escudero	def.	Zack Surdyka	Decision (unanimous)	3	5:00

== Bellator 101 ==
Bellator 101
- Date: September 27, 2013
- Venue: Rose Garden
- City: Portland, Oregon
- Attendance: 2,368
- Total gate: $87,568

Bellator 101 took place on September 27, 2013 at the Rose Garden Arena in Portland, Oregon. The event aired live in prime time on Spike TV.

Background

Bellator 101 featured the Season 9 Lightweight Tournament Quarterfinal bouts.

Rob Sinclair was scheduled to face Rich Clementi in a Lightweight Tournament Quarterfinal fight, but on Sept. 9, 2013 had to pull out due to injury and was replaced by Ricardo Tirloni. Marcin Held was originally scheduled to face Tirloni on the preliminary card, and Ryan Healy took the fight as a replacement.

Results

Main Card (Spike TV)
Weight Class				Method	Round	Time	Notes
Bantamweight	Joe Warren	def.	Nick Kirk	Submission (reverse triangle armbar)	2	3:03	(Note: Bantamweight Tournament Semifinal)
Lightweight	Alexander Sarnavskiy	def.	Marcus Davis	Submission (rear naked choke)	1	1:40	(Note: Lightweight Tournament Quarterfinal)
Lightweight	Ricardo Tirloni	def.	Rich Clementi	Decision (unanimous) (30-26, 30-27, 30-27)	3	5:00
Lightweight	Will Brooks	def.	John Alessio	Decision (unanimous) (30-26, 30-27, 30-25)	3	5:00
Lightweight	Saad Awad	def.	Martin Stapleton	Submission (rear naked choke)	1	3:46
Preliminary Card (Spike.com)
Welterweight	Nathan Coy	def.	Andy Uhrich	Decision (unanimous) (29-28, 29-28, 29-28)	3	5:00
Lightweight	Marcin Held	def.	Ryan Healy	KO (punches)	1	1:12
Middleweight	Dave Vitkay	def.	Tyson Jeffries	Submission (rear naked choke)	3	3:07
Lightweight	Brent Primus	def.	Scott Thometz	Submission (rear naked choke)	1	3:48
Bantamweight	Austin Springer	def.	Zack Skinner	Decision (unanimous) (30-26, 29-28, 29-28)	3	5:00
Middleweight	Peter Aspenwal	def.	Jeremiah Riggs	Decision (split) (29-28, 28-29, 29-28)	3	5:00

== Bellator 102 ==
Bellator 102
- Date: October 4, 2013
- Venue: Visalia Convention Center
- City: Visalia, California
- Attendance: 1,482
- Total gate: $73,410

Bellator 102 took place on October 4, 2013 at Visalia Convention Center in Visalia, California. The event aired live in prime time on Spike TV.

Background

Bellator 102 featured the Heavyweight Tournament Semifinals, Middleweight Tournament Semifinals and Summer Series bantamweight tournament final between Anthony Leone and Rafael "Morcego" Silva.

Michael Page and Kenny Ento were scheduled to face each other in a Welterweight bout on this card. However, on September 30, it was announced that Page was injured and both he and Ento were removed from the card.

Perry Filkins was to face Brennan Ward in the Middleweight Tournament Semifinals. However, he had to pull out due to injury and was replaced by Joe Pacheco.

Results

Main Card (Spike TV)
Weight Class				Method	Round	Time	Notes
Heavyweight	Cheick Kongo	def.	Mark Godbeer	TKO (knees and punches)	2	2:04	(Note: Heavyweight Tournament Semifinals)
Heavyweight	Vinicius Queiroz	def.	Lavar Johnson	KO (punch)	1	0:23
Bantamweight	Rafael Silva	def.	Anthony Leone	Decision (unanimous) (30-27, 30-27, 30-27)	3	5:00	(Note: 2013 Summer Series Bantamweight Tournament Final)
Middleweight	Mikkel Parlo	def.	Jason Butcher	Decision (unanimous) (30-27, 29-28, 29-28)	3	5:00	(Note: Middleweight Tournament Semifinals)
Middleweight	Brennan Ward	def.	Joe Pacheco	Submission (guillotine choke)	2	2:41
Preliminary Card (Spike.com)
Featherweight	Scott Cleve	def.	Isaac DeJesus	TKO (strikes)	2	3:14
Heavyweight	Javy Ayala	def.	Thiago Santos	KO (punches)	1	5:00
Lightweight	Brandon Girtz	def.	Poppies Martinez	Submission (armbar)	1	1:20
Catchweight (165 lb)	Stephen Martinez	def.	Bryan Travers	Technical submission (guillotine choke)	1	0:56
Lightweight	Cain Carrizosa	def.	Juan Quesada	Submission (triangle choke)	2	4:51
Heavyweight	Brandon Cash	def.	William Richey	TKO (exhaustion)	2	5:00

== Bellator 103 ==
Bellator 103
- Date: October 11, 2013
- Venue: Kansas Star Arena
- City: Mulvane, Kansas

Bellator 103 took place on October 11, 2013 at Kansas Star Arena in Mulvane, Kansas. The event aired live in prime time on Spike TV.

Background

Bellator 103 featured the Featherweight Tournament Semifinal bouts.

Results

Main Card (Spike TV)
Weight Class				Method	Round	Time	Notes
Featherweight	Patricio Freire	def.	Fabricio Guerreiro	Decision (unanimous) (30-27, 30-27, 30-27)	3	5:00	(Note: Featherweight Tournament Semifinals)
Featherweight	Justin Wilcox	def.	Joe Taimanglo	Decision (unanimous) (29-28, 30-27, 30-27)	3	5:00
Lightweight	David Rickels	def.	J.J. Ambrose	TKO (punches)	3	2:37
Light Heavyweight	Mikhail Zayats	def.	Aaron Rosa	Submission (kimura)	1	0:47
Preliminary Card (Spike.com)
Light Heavyweight	Carlos Eduardo	def.	Wayman Carter	Submission (rear naked choke)	1	2:06
Lightweight	Remy Bussieres	def.	Blake Pool	Decision (unanimous) (30-27, 29-28, 29-28)	3	5:00
Heavyweight	Maurice Jackson	def.	Matt Uhde	TKO (cut)	1	0:52
Lightweight	Donnie Bell	def.	Marcio Navarro	Submission (rear neck crank)	1	2:06
Bantamweight	Jeimeson Saudino	def.	Jesse Thornton	Decision (split) (29-28, 28-29, 29-28)	3	5:00
Catchweight (150 lb)	Ricky Musgrave	def.	Cody Carrillo	Submission (kimura)	1	2:59

== Bellator 104 ==
Bellator 104
- Date: October 18, 2013
- Venue: U.S. Cellular Center
- City: Cedar Rapids, Iowa

Bellator 104 took place on October 18, 2013 at the U.S. Cellular Center in Cedar Rapids, Iowa. The event aired live in prime time on Spike TV.

Background

Bellator 104 featured the Welterweight Tournament Semifinal bouts.

Results

Main Card (Spike TV)
Weight Class				Method	Round	Time	Notes
Welterweight	Rick Hawn	def.	Brent Weedman	Decision (unanimous) (30-27, 30-27, 30-27)	3	5:00	(Note: Welterweight Tournament Semifinals)
Welterweight	Ron Keslar	def.	War Machine	Technical Submission (rear naked choke)	1	3:31
Middleweight	Kendall Grove	def.	Joe Vedepo	Decision (unanimous) (29-28, 30-27, 30-27)	3	5:00
Heavyweight	Peter Graham	def.	Eric Prindle	Decision (unanimous) (30-27, 30-27, 30-27)	3	5:00
Preliminary Card (Spike.com)
Welterweight	Paul Bradley	def.	Karl Amoussou	Decision (unanimous) (29-28, 29-28, 29-28)	3	5:00
Lightweight	Paul Sass	def.	Rod Montoya	Submission (toe hold)	1	2:01
Catchweight (150 lb)	Rob Emerson	def.	Jared Downing	Submission (inverted heel hook)	1	1:44
Catchweight (160 lb)	Brandon Girtz	def.	Mike Estus	Submission (armbar)	1	4:25
Catchweight (161 lb)	Cliff Wright	def.	Derek Loffer	Submission (armbar)	2	4:28
Featherweight	Andre Tieva	def.	Chris Lane	TKO (punches)	1	2:20

== Bellator 105 ==
Bellator 105
- Date: October 25, 2013
- Venue: Santa Ana Star Center
- City: Rio Rancho, New Mexico

Bellator 105 took place on October 25, 2013 at Santa Ana Star Center in Rio Rancho, New Mexico. The event aired live in prime time on Spike TV.

Background

Bellator 105 featured the Lightweight Tournament Semifinal bouts.

Eugene Fadiora was initially scheduled to face Andreas Spang. However, Spang was removed from the card and replaced by Keith Berry.

Results

Main Card (Spike TV)
Weight Class				Method	Round	Time	Notes
Lightweight	Will Brooks	def.	Saad Awad	Decision (unanimous) (30-27, 30-27, 30-27)	3	5:00	(Note: Lightweight Tournament Semifinals)
Lightweight	Alexander Sarnavskiy	def.	Ricardo Tirloni	Submission (triangle choke)	1	1:08
Heavyweight	Siala-Mou Siliga	def.	Ron Sparks	Submission (keylock)	1	2:52
Middleweight	Eugene Fadiora	def.	Keith Berry	TKO (elbows)	2	4:19
Preliminary Card (Spike.com)
Featherweight	Desmond Green	def.	Angelo Sanchez	TKO (cut)	2	1:04	(Note: Doctor stopped the fight due to a cut caused by an elbow strike.)
Heavyweight	Raphael Butler	def.	Joseph Bryant	TKO (strikes)	1	1:04
Light Heavyweight	Volkan Oezdemir	def.	Josh Lanier	TKO (strikes)	1	3:13
Bantamweight	Luis Nogueira	def.	Frank Baca	Submission (arm triangle choke)	1	4:41
Middleweight	Eddie Larrea	def.	Rocky Ramirez	Submission (heel hook)	2	1:45
Bantamweight	Steve Garcia	def.	Shawn Bunch	TKO (punches)	3	3:29
Unaired
Bantamweight	Jesse Brock	def.	Adrian Cruz	Decision (unanimous)	3	5:00

== Bellator 106 ==
Bellator 106
- Date: November 2, 2013
- Venue: Convention and Entertainment Center
- City: Long Beach, California
- Attendance: 6,596
- Total gate: $350,319

Bellator 106 took place on November 2, 2013 at Convention and Entertainment Center in Long Beach, California. The event aired live on Spike TV.

Background

Bellator 106 was to be Bellator's first ever pay-per-view event and was expected to be headlined by a Light Heavyweight bout between Tito Ortiz and Quinton Jackson, both of whom would have been making their promotional debuts. However, on October 25, it was announced that Ortiz was out of the bout due to injury. Subsequently, Bellator announced that the show would air on Spike TV rather that PPV.

The main event featured a Lightweight title rematch between the current champion Michael Chandler and former champion Eddie Alvarez. Chandler defeated Alvarez via fourth round submission in their original bout back at Bellator 58.

The Heavyweight tournament final between Cheick Kongo and Vinicius Queiroz was originally scheduled for this card. However, an injury to Queiroz forced it off the card and it will be rescheduled on a future show.

Results

Main card
Weight class				Method	Round	Time	Notes
Lightweight	Eddie Alvarez	def.	Michael Chandler (c)	Decision (split) (48-47, 47-48, 48-47)	5	5:00	(Note: For Lightweight Championship)
Light Heavyweight	Emanuel Newton	def.	Muhammed Lawal	Decision (unanimous) (49-46, 49-46, 49-46)	5	5:00	(Note: For Interim Light Heavyweight Championship)
Featherweight	Daniel Mason-Straus	def.	Pat Curran (c)	Decision (unanimous) (49-45, 48-46, 48-46)	5	5:00	(Note: For Featherweight Championship)
Welterweight	Joe Riggs	def.	Mike Bronzoulis	Decision (unanimous) (30-27, 30-27, 30-27)	3	5:00	(Note: Fight Master Welterweight Final)
Featherweight	Mike Richman	def.	Akop Stepanyan	TKO (punches)	1	4:05
Preliminary Card (Spike.com)
Welterweight	Cristiano Souza	def.	Alejandro Garcia	Submission (rear naked choke)	3	3:06
Light Heavyweight	Brandon Halsey	def.	Hector Ramirez	TKO (punches)	1	0:52
Lightweight	Mike Guymon	def.	Aaron Miller	Submission (triangle choke)	2	4:20
Catchweight (150 lb)	Cleber Luciano	def.	Joe Camacho	Decision (unanimous) (30-27, 30-27, 30-27)	3	5:00
Lightweight	Josh Smith	def.	Darren Smith	Decision (unanimous) (29-28, 29-28, 29-28)	3	5:00
Unaired
Welterweight	Jesse Juarez	def.	Joe Williams	Submission (guillotine choke)	1	0:57

== Bellator 107 ==
Bellator 107
- Date: November 8, 2013
- Venue: WinStar World Casino
- City: Thackerville, Oklahoma

Bellator 107 took place on November 8, 2013 at the WinStar World Casino in Thackerville, Oklahoma. The event aired live in prime time on Spike TV.

Background

Bellator 107 featured the Heavyweight Tournament final, Middleweight Tournament final and Bantamweight Tournament final.

Cheick Kongo was originally scheduled to face Vinicius Queiroz in the Heavyweight tournament finals, but Queiroz withdrew due to a knee injury. He was replaced by Peter Graham.

Results

Main Card (Spike TV)
Weight Class				Method	Round	Time	Notes
Heavyweight	Cheick Kongo	def.	Peter Graham	Decision (unanimous) (30-27, 30-27, 30-27)	3	5:00	(Note: Heavyweight Tournament Final)
Bantamweight	Joe Warren	def.	Travis Marx	TKO (knee and punches)	2	1:54	(Note: Bantamweight Tournament Final)
Middleweight	Brennan Ward	def.	Mikkel Parlo	TKO (punches)	2	1:39	(Note: Middleweight Tournament Final)
Catchweight (157 lb)	Derek Campos	def.	Martin Stapleton	Decision (unanimous) (30-27, 30-27, 30-27)	3	5:00
Preliminary Card (Spike.com)
Lightweight	Patricky Freire	def.	Edson Berto	Decision (unanimous) (30-27, 29-28, 30-27)	3	5:00
Middleweight	Jonas Billstein	def.	Cortez Coleman	Decision (unanimous) (30-27, 30-27, 30-27)	3	5:00
Light Heavyweight	Mike Mucitelli	def.	Ryan McCurdy	Decision (unanimous) (29-28, 29-28, 29-28)	3	5:00
Heavyweight	Raphael Butler	def.	Josh Burns	Verbal submission (punches)	1	2:14
Light Heavyweight	Linton Vassell	def.	Matt Jones	Decision (unanimous) (30-27, 30-26, 30-26)	3	5:00
Unaired
Catchweight (156 lb)	Chris Jones	def.	Robert White	Decision (unanimous)	3	5:00

== Bellator 108 ==
Bellator 108
- Date: November 15, 2013
- Venue: Revel Casino
- City: Atlantic City, New Jersey

Bellator 108 took place on November 15, 2013 at Revel Casino in Atlantic City, New Jersey The event aired live in prime time on Spike TV.

Background

Bellator 108 featured the Featherweight Tournament Finals.

Heavyweight champion Alexander Volkov made the first defense of his title against Vitaly Minakov on this show in the co-main event.

The card featured the Bellator debut of Quinton Jackson following the cancellation of his bout against Tito Ortiz. He faced Bellator and UFC veteran Joey Beltran in the main event.

Nah-Shon Burrell was originally scheduled to face Dante Rivera on this card. However, he was rescheduled to face Jesus Martinez due to undisclosed reasons.

Results

Main Card (Spike TV)
Weight Class				Method	Round	Time	Notes
Catchweight (210 lb)	Quinton Jackson	def.	Joey Beltran	TKO (punches)	1	4:59
Heavyweight	Vitaly Minakov	def.	Alexander Volkov (c)	TKO (punches)	1	2:57	(Note: Heavyweight Title fight)
Bantamweight	Marcos Galvao	def.	Tom McKenna	TKO (punches)	1	4:29
Featherweight	Patricio Freire	def.	Justin Wilcox	TKO (punches)	1	2:23	(Note: Featherweight Tournament Final)
Preliminary Card (Spike.com)
Catchweight (174 lb)	Sam Oropeza	def.	Chip Moraza-Pollard	TKO (punches)	1	0:37
Light Heavyweight	Tom DeBlass	def.	Jason Lambert	KO (punch)	1	1:45
Catchweight (180 lb)	Nah-Shon Burrell	def.	Jesus Martinez	Decision (unanimous) (29-28, 30-27, 30-27)	3	5:00
Catchweight (150 lb)	Anthony Morrison	def.	Kenny Foster	Majority decision (28-28, 29-27, 30-26)	3	5:00	(Note: Foster was docked one point for illegal groin strikes.)
Light Heavyweight	Liam McGeary	def.	Najim Wali	Submission (armbar)	1	1:31
Featherweight	Will Martinez	def.	Kevin Roddy	Submission (rear naked choke)	1	3:50
Featherweight	Dan Matala	def.	Ryan Cafaro	TKO (strikes)	2	3:52
Bantamweight	Rob Sullivan	def.	Sergio da Silva	Decision (unanimous) (29-28, 30-27, 30-27)	3	5:00

== Bellator 109 ==
Bellator 109
- Date: November 22, 2013
- Venue: Sands Casino Event Center
- City: Bethlehem, Pennsylvania

Bellator 109 took place on November 22, 2013 at Sands Casino Event Center in Bethlehem, Pennsylvania. The event aired live in prime time on Spike TV.

Background

Bellator 109 featured the 2013 Season 9 Welterweight and Lightweight Tournament Finals.

Michael Page and Andrew Osbourne were slated to face each other in a Welterweight bout on this card but the fight was scrapped due to Page recovering from lingering injuries.

Matt Riddle was expected to come out of his 3-week retirement to fight Nathan Coy at this event. However, he pulled out of the bout on November 13, 2013.

Results

Main Card (Spike TV)
Weight Class				Method	Round	Time	Notes
Middleweight	Alexander Shlemenko (c)	def.	Doug Marshall	KO (punch to the body)	1	4:28	(Note: Middleweight Championship)
Welterweight	Rick Hawn	def.	Ron Keslar	KO (punch)	3	0:55	(Note: Welterweight Tournament Final)
Lightweight	Will Brooks	def.	Alexander Sarnavskiy	Decision (unanimous) (30-26, 30-27, 30-27)	3	5:00	(Note: Lightweight Tournament Final)
Lightweight	Terry Etim	def.	Patrick Cenoble	Decision (unanimous) (30-27, 29-28, 30-26)	3	5:00
Preliminary Card (Spike.com)
Lightweight	Mike Bannon	def.	Ahsan Abdulla	Technical submission (arm triangle choke)	1	1:51
Heavyweight	Blagoy Ivanov	def.	Keith Bell	Submission (rear naked choke)	1	3:59
Catchweight (153 lb)	Goiti Yamauchi	def.	Saul Almeida	KO (punches)	1	2:04
Lightweight	Bubba Jenkins	def.	Ian Rammel	TKO (punches)	3	2:38
Lightweight	Brent Primus	def.	Brett Glass	Submission (rear naked choke)	1	3:20
Featherweight	Lester Caslow	def.	Jay Haas	Submission (guillotine choke)	3	2:44

== Tournaments ==
=== Heavyweight tournament bracket ===
Semifinals
(France) Cheick Kongo	TKO
(England) Mark Godbeer	2
(Brazil) Vinicius Queiroz	KO
(United States) Lavar Johnson	1

Finals
(France) Cheick Kongo	UD
(Australia) Peter Graham*	3

- (*) Replaced Vinicius Queiroz

=== Middleweight tournament bracket ===
Quarterfinals
(United States) Brennan Ward*	TKO
(United States) Justin Torrey	2
(United States) Perry Filkins	SUB
(United States) Jeremy Kimball**	3
(Denmark) Mikkel Parlo	UD
(United States) Brian Rogers	3
(United States) Jason Butcher	TKO
(Brazil) Giva Santana	2

Semifinals
(United States) Brennan Ward	SUB
(United States) Joe Pacheco***	2
(Denmark) Mikkel Parlo	UD
(United States) Jason Butcher	3

Finals
(United States) Brennan Ward	TKO
(Denmark) Mikkel Parlo	2

- (*) Replaced Andreas Spang
- (**) Replaced Dan Cramer
- (***) Replaced Perry Filkins

=== Welterweight tournament bracket ===
Quarterfinals
(United States) Rick Hawn**	UD
(Guam) Herman Terrado	3
(United States) Brent Weedman	SUB
(United States) Justin Baesman	1
(United States) Ron Keslar*	SD
(Brazil) Luis Melo	3
(United States) War Machine	SUB
(Canada) Vaughn Anderson	2

Semifinals
(United States) Rick Hawn	UD
(United States) Brent Weedman	3
(United States) Ron Keslar	SUB
(United States) War Machine	1

Finals
(United States) Rick Hawn	KO
(United States) Ron Keslar	3

- (*) Replaced Matt Riddle
- (**) Replaced Mark Scanlon

=== Lightweight tournament bracket ===
Quarterfinals
(United States) Will Brooks	UD
(Canada) John Alessio	3
(United States) Saad Awad	SUB
(England) Martin Stapleton	1
(Russia) Alexander Sarnavskiy	SUB
(United States) Marcus Davis	1
(Brazil) Ricardo Tirloni*	UD
(United States) Rich Clementi	3

Semifinals
(United States) Will Brooks	UD
(United States) Saad Awad	3
(Russia) Alexander Sarnavskiy	SUB
(Brazil) Ricardo Tirloni	1

Finals
(United States) Will Brooks	UD
(Russia) Alexander Sarnavskiy	3

- (*) Replaced Rob Sinclair

=== Featherweight tournament bracket ===
Quarterfinals
(Brazil) Patricio Freire	KO
(Brazil) Diego Nunes	1
(Brazil) Fabricio Guerreiro	UD
(United States) Desmond Green	3
(United States) Justin Wilcox*	SUB
(Russia) Akop Stepanyan	2
(Guam) Joe Taimanglo	UD
(England) Andrew Fisher	3

Semifinals
(Brazil) Patricio Freire	UD
(Brazil) Fabricio Guerreiro	3
(United States) Justin Wilcox	UD
(Guam) Joe Taimanglo	3

Finals
(Brazil) Patricio Freire	TKO
(United States) Justin Wilcox	1

- (*) Replaced Shahbulat Shamhalaev

=== Bantamweight tournament bracket ===
Semifinals
(United States) Joe Warren	SUB
(United States) Nick Kirk	2
(United States) Travis Marx	TKO
(Italy) Brandon Bender	2

Finals
(United States) Joe Warren	TKO
(United States) Travis Marx	2
