= Cleber Luciano =

Brazilian mixed martial artist

- Born: Cleber Luciano; Brazil
- Nationality: Brazilian
- Height: 5 ft 6 in (1.68 m)
- Weight: 150 lb (68 kg; 11 st)
- Division: Featherweight; Lightweight
- Reach: 67.0 in (170 cm)
- Fighting out of: Huntington Beach, California, United States
- Team: Cleber Jiu-Jitsu
- Rank: Seventh degree coral belt in Brazilian jiu-jitsu under Royler Gracie; Black belt in judo
- Years active: 1998-present

Mixed martial arts record
- Total: 17
- Wins: 12
- By knockout: 1
- By submission: 8
- By decision: 3
- Losses: 5
- By knockout: 3
- By submission: 1
- By decision: 1

Other information
- Mixed martial arts record from Sherdog

Cleber Luciano Born December 15, 1973 is a Brazilian professional mixed martial artist currently competing in the featherweight division.

== Background ==
Born and raised in Brazil, Luciano began judo at the age of five and Brazilian jiu-jitsu at the age of seven, and received his BJJ black belt at the age of 19. Luciano is a seven-time BJJ World Champion, a six-time Brazilian BJJ Champion, a five-time Brazilian State BJJ Champion, a three-time World No Gi Champion, a six-time Pan Am Champion, and is a three-time U.S. Open Champion, among various other titles.

== Mixed martial arts record ==
Professional record breakdown
17 matches	12 wins	5 losses
By knockout	1	3
By submission	8	1
By decision	3	1

Res.	Record	Opponent	Method	Event	Date	Round	Time	Location	Notes
Win	12–5	Ramiro Hernandez	Decision (unanimous)	Title Quest - Hernandez vs. Luciano	August 29, 2015	3	5:00	Danbury, Wisconsin, United States	
Win	11–5	Aaron Miller	Submission (armbar)	Bellator 136	April 10, 2015	2	4:36	Irvine, California, United States	Catchweight bout of 150 lbs.
Win	10–5	Patrick Conroy	Submission (kimura)	MMAADU: MMA Down Under 5	April 5, 2014	1	N/A	Findon, South Australia, Australia	
Win	9–5	Joe Camacho	Decision (unanimous)	Bellator 106	November 2, 2013	3	5:00	Long Beach, California, United States	Catchweight bout of 150 lbs.
Loss	8–5	Nick Piedmont	TKO (punches)	Bellator 92	March 7, 2013	1	0:55	Temecula, California, United States	
Win	8–4	Mario Navarro	Decision (unanimous)	Bellator 85	January 17, 2013	3	5:00	Irvine, California, United States	Featherweight bout.
Win	7–4	Chad Freeman	Submission (rear-naked choke)	FFL 2	October 19, 2012	1	0:59	Prince George, British Columbia, Canada	
Win	6–4	Xavier Stokes	Submission (armbar)	LBFN 14	May 6, 2012	3	2:59	Long Beach, California, United States	Catchweight bout of 160 lbs.
Loss	5–4	Chris Saunders	KO (punches)	IFS 7	April 10, 2011	2	0:22	Pico Rivera, California, United States	
Win	5–3	Tony Llamas	Submission (rear-naked choke)	LBFN 10	October 17, 2010	1	0:29	Long Beach, California, United States	
Win	4–3	Todd Willingham	Submission (rear-naked choke)	PWP: War on the Mainland	August 14, 2010	2	3:18	Irvine, California, United States	
Win	3–3	Mateo Pena	Submission (armbar)	TWC 7	March 7, 2010	1	2:11	Porterville, California, United States	
Win	2–3	Tony Llamas	Submission (rear-naked choke)	TWC 5	September 24, 2009	1	0:54	Porterville, California, United States	
Loss	1–3	Evan Dunham	Submission (guillotine choke)	PFP: Ring of Fire	December 9, 2007	3	N/A	Manila, Philippines	
Loss	1–2	Preston Scharf	Decision (unanimous)	EFWC: The Untamed	October 6, 2007	3	5:00	Anaheim, California, United States	
Loss	1–1	Fabiano Iha	KO (punch)	EC 22	November 21, 1998	1	7:57	West Valley City, Utah, United States	
Win	1–0	Victor Hunsaker	TKO (punches)	EC 22	November 21, 1998	1	6:20	West Valley City, Utah, United States	

== See also ==
- List of male mixed martial artists
