= Rad Martinez =

American mixed martial arts fighter (born 1978)

- Born: Radly Martinez; October 10, 1978 (age 48); West Jordan, Utah, U.S.
- Nationality: American
- Height: 5 ft 6 in (1.68 m)
- Weight: 145 lb (66 kg; 10.4 st)
- Division: Lightweight; Featherweight
- Fighting out of: West Jordan, Utah
- Team: Victory MMA
- Wrestling: NCAA Division I Wrestling All-American at Clarion University
- Years active: 2008–2014

Mixed martial arts record
- Total: 18
- Wins: 15
- By knockout: 6
- By decision: 9
- Losses: 3
- By knockout: 1
- By submission: 1
- By decision: 1

Other information
- Mixed martial arts record from Sherdog

Radley Martinez (born March 12, 1978) is retired American mixed martial artist. He was signed with Bellator Fighting Championships, where he competed in their featherweight division.

== Amateur wrestling career ==
Martinez was a standout wrestler in college, competing for Clarion University. While at Clarion, Martinez qualified for the NCAA championships on three occasions. As a sophomore in 2001 with a fourth-place finish at the EWL(Eastern Wrestling League) championships, in 2002 with a second-place finish at the EWL championships and in 2003 with a third-place finish at the EWL championships. In 2003, as a senior he entered the NCAA tournament unseeded but made All American honors when he captured a fifth-place finish. In the fifth place bout he defeated #2 seed Cliff Moore of Iowa by decision 4–0. Martinez ended his career with a 98–27 record.

== Mixed martial arts career ==
=== Early career ===
Martinez made his professional MMA debut in January 2008 and has made a name for himself fighting mainly in the West Coast region. Before signing with Bellator, he amassed an impressive record of 9 wins and 2 losses.

=== Bellator Fighting Championships ===
Martinez made his Bellator debut at Bellator 50 in September 2011, where he defeated Brian van Hoven by decision. He returned to the promotion at Bellator 62 on the preliminary card against Doug Frey and won via first-round TKO.

In the fall of 2012, Martinez entered as a participant in the Bellator Featherweight Tournament. He faced Nazareno Malegarie in the opening round at Bellator 76. He won the fight via unanimous decision.

Martinez eventually faced Shahbulat Shamhalaev in the finals of the Season Seven Featherweight Tournament on February 21, 2013 at Bellator 90. Despite winning the first round, Martinez lost the fight via knock out in the second round.

Martinez had his retirement fight at Bellator 114 on March 28 where he defeated Edson Berto by unanimous decision.

== Personal life ==
Martinez was also featured on ESPN's Outside the Lines in June 2011. The story covered how Martinez took care of his paraplegic father while trying to maintain a career in mixed martial arts. Martinez is a good friend and was a college wrestling teammate of former UFC Lightweight Champion Frankie Edgar.

== Championships and accomplishments ==
- Bellator Fighting Championships
  - Bellator Season 7 Featherweight Tournament Runner-Up

== Mixed martial arts record ==
Professional record breakdown
18 matches	15 wins	3 losses
By knockout	6	1
By submission	0	1
By decision	9	1

Res.	Record	Opponent	Method	Event	Date	Round	Time	Location	Notes
Win	15–3	Edson Berto	Decision (unanimous)	Bellator 114	March 28, 2014	3	5:00	West Valley City, Utah, United States	
Loss	14–3	Shahbulat Shamhalaev	KO (punch)	Bellator 90	February 21, 2013	2	2:12	West Valley City, Utah, United States	Bellator Season 7 Featherweight Tournament Final
Win	14–2	Wagnney Fabiano	Decision (unanimous)	Bellator 80	November 9, 2012	3	5:00	Hollywood, Florida, United States	Bellator Season 7 Featherweight Tournament Semifinal
Win	13–2	Nazareno Malegarie	Decision (unanimous)	Bellator 76	October 12, 2012	3	5:00	Windsor, Ontario, Canada	Bellator Season 7 Featherweight Tournament Quarterfinal
Win	12–2	Doug Frey	TKO (punches)	Bellator 62	March 23, 2012	1	4:08	Laredo, Texas, United States	
Win	11–2	Greg McFarland	TKO (punches)	Fight Kings – Phenoms	January 13, 2012	1	2:02	Hollywood, Florida, United States	
Win	10–2	Brian van Hoven	Decision (unanimous)	Bellator 50	September 17, 2011	3	5:00	Hollywood, Florida, United States	
Loss	9–2	Brian Cobb	Submission (rear-naked choke)	FFW 3: Back in Bakersfield	May 20, 2011	2	3:41	Bakersfield, California, United States	
Win	9–1	Mike Christensen	Decision (unanimous)	Showdown Fights: New Blood	January 28, 2011	3	5:00	Orem, Utah, United States	
Win	8–1	Joe Brammer	TKO (doctor stoppage)	ZarMMA: Fight Night	November 12, 2010	3	3:27	Layton, Utah, United States	
Win	7–1	Jacob Clark	Decision (unanimous)	KOTC: Underground 57	May 22, 2010	3	5:00	Cortez, Colorado, United States	
Win	6–1	Steve Sharp	Decision (unanimous)	Throwdown Showdown 5: Homecoming	November 20, 2009	5	5:00	Orem, Utah, United States	
Win	5–1	Stryder Davis	Decision (unanimous)	Throwdown Showdown 4: Cuatro	June 6, 2009	5	5:00	West Valley City, Utah, United States	
Win	4–1	David Allred	TKO (punches)	Jeremy Horn's Elite Fight Night 6	January 5, 2009	1	2:13	Layton, Utah, United States	
Win	3–1	Steve Sharp	Decision (unanimous)	Throwdown Showdown 2: The Return	September 26, 2008	5	5:00	Orem, Utah, United States	
Win	2–1	Eddie Pelczynski	TKO (punches)	Jeremy Horn's Elite Fight Night 3	July 12, 2008	1	1:25	Salt Lake City, Utah, United States	
Loss	1–1	Travis Marx	Decision (unanimous)	Throwdown Showdown 1: Showdown	April 18, 2008	3	5:00	Orem, Utah, United States	
Win	1–0	Dan Berry	TKO (punches)	UCE: Round 30 – Episode 4	January 26, 2008	1	2:31	Salt Lake City, Utah, United States	
