= Akop Stepanyan =

Russian mixed martial artist

Akop Stepanyan Акоп Степанян Հակոբ Ստեփանյան
- Born: May 6, 1986 (age 40); Yerevan, Armenian SSR, Soviet Union
- Nationality: Russian
- Height: 5 ft 9 in (1.75 m)
- Weight: 155 lb (70 kg; 11.1 st)
- Division: Featherweight (currently); Lightweight
- Reach: 68.0 in (173 cm)
- Style: Taekwondo, Boxing, ARB
- Fighting out of: Saint Petersburg, Leningrad, Russia
- Team: RusFighters Sport Club (USA); Reign Training Center
- Rank: Black belt in Taekwondo; Master of Sports in Boxing; Master of Sports in Kickboxing
- Years active: 2009–present

Mixed martial arts record
- Total: 45
- Wins: 28
- By knockout: 17
- By submission: 2
- By decision: 9
- Losses: 15
- By knockout: 3
- By submission: 9
- By decision: 3
- Draws: 1
- No contests: 1

Other information
- Mixed martial arts record from Sherdog

Akop Stepanyan (Russian: Акоп Степанян, Armenian: Հակոբ Ստեփանյան; born May 6, 1986) is a Russian mixed martial artist of Armenian heritage who competed in the featherweight and lightweight divisions of Bellator Fighting Championships and Absolute Championship Berkut.

== Mixed martial arts career ==
=== M-1 Global ===
Stepanyan lost via submission (armbar) to Zagalav Mahachev at M-1 Challenge - 2009 Selections 2 in the first round.

=== Post-M-1 Global ===
Stepanyan lost via unanimous decision (30–28, 29–28, 29–28) to Djamal Kurbanov at FEFoMP - Vladivostok Pankration Open Cup 2009 on April 25, 2009.

=== Return to M-1 Global ===
Stepanyan lost via submission (rear-naked choke) to Magomed Magomedov at M-1 Challenge - 2009 Selections 5 in the first round.

Stepanyan was released from the M-1 after going 0–2 in the promotion.

=== Bellator MMA ===
In July, Stepanyan signed in Bellator.

Stepanyan was then entered into the season seven featherweight tournament. His quarterfinal opponent was Brazilian Jiu-Jitsu black belt Wagnney Fabiano at Bellator 76. He lost the bout via first round armbar submission.

Stepanyan next faced former Sengoku Featherweight Champion Marlon Sandro in season eight featherweight tournament on February 7, 2013, at Bellator 88. He lost the fight via controversial majority decision.

Stepanyan faced Chris Saunders on March 7, 2013, at Bellator 92. He won the fight via TKO in the third round.

Stepanyan was expected to face Shahbulat Shamhalaev on September 13, 2013, at Bellator 99. However, Shamhalaev withdrew from the tournament and was replaced by Justin Wilcox. Stepanyan dominated the first round, but was stopped by a rear naked choke submission in the second round.

Stepanyan faced Mike Richman at Bellator 106 on November 2, 2013. Stepanyan had Richman in trouble early in the fight, but lost in the first round via TKO.

=== League S-70 ===
After Bellator dismissal Akop Stepanyan faced ex-UFC fighter Andre Winner. He won via unanimous decision.

=== Absolute Championship Berkut ===
Stepanyan signed a four-fight deal with the ACB in February, 2017.

Stepanyan faced Mukhamed Kokov on April 15, 2017, at ACB 57: Payback. He lost the fight via submission in the third round.

Stepanyan faced Felipe Cruz on June 17, 2017, at ACB 62. He won the fight via knockout in the first round.

== Championships and accomplishments ==
=== ARG (Army Hand-to-Hand Combat) ===
- Russian Union of Martial Arts
  - Russian National Champion of Army Hand-to-Hand Combat

=== Kickboxing ===
- Kick-Boxing Federation of Russia
  - Russian National Champion
  - Silver Medalist European Championship 2004

=== Taekwondo ===
- Taekwondo Union of Russia
  - Russian National Champion 2002

== Mixed martial arts record ==
Professional record breakdown
45 matches	28 wins	15 losses
By knockout	17	3
By submission	2	9
By decision	9	3
Draws	1	
No contests	1	

Res.	Record	Opponent	Method	Event	Date	Round	Time	Location	Notes
Loss	28–15 (1)	Valery Gritsutin	TKO (submission to punches)	Yuzhniy Rubezh 4	December 21, 2024	2	0:50	Krasnodar, Russia	
Win	28–14 (1)	Arlen Ribeiro	TKO (punches)	AMC Fight Nights 124	August 23, 2024	2	2:14	Yerevan, Armenia	
Loss	27–14 (1)	Nikita Podkovalnikov	Submission (rear-naked choke)	Open FC 29	April 15, 2023	3	2:27	Saint Petersburg, Russia	Return to Lightweight.
Loss	27–13 (1)	Shamil Gasanov	Submission (guillotine choke)	ProFC 69	December 18, 2021	1	1:40	Rostov-on-Don, Russia	
Loss	27–12 (1)	Roman Silagadze	Submission (arm-triangle choke)	AMC Fight Nights 100	April 10, 2021	2	4:44	Moscow, Russia	Return to Featherweight.
Win	27–11 (1)	Mikhail Gogitidze	TKO (punches)	AMC Fight Nights 99	December 25, 2020	2	0:59	Moscow, Russia	
Win	26–11 (1)	Shahin Najafi	TKO (punches)	Gorilla Fighting 22	December 13, 2019	2	1:35	Krasnodar, Russia	
NC	25–11 (1)	Elnur Agaev	NC (injury)	Modern Fighting Pankration 226	December 15, 2018	1	4:07	Khabarovsk, Russia	Return to Lightweight.
Loss	25–11	Magomed Sulumov	Decision (unanimous)	ACB 89	September 8, 2018	3	5:00	Krasnodar, Russia	
Loss	25–10	Andrew Fisher	TKO (leg injury)	ACB 74	November 18, 2017	2	1:01	Vienna, Austria	
Win	25–9	Felipe Cruz	KO (spinning wheel kick)	ACB 62	June 17, 2017	1	4:38	Rostov-on-Don, Russia	
Loss	24–9	Mukhamed Kokov	Submission (kimura)	ACB 57	April 15, 2017	3	0:51	Moscow, Russia	Return to Featherweight.
Win	24–8	Thiago Meller	Decision (split)	League S-70: Plotforma Cup 2016	August 21, 2016	3	5:00	Sochi, Russia	Catchweight (159 lb) bout.
Win	23–8	Will Chope	Decision (split)	Abu Dhabi Warriors 4	May 24, 2016	3	5:00	Abu Dhabi, United Arab Emirates	
Loss	22–8	Vener Galiev	Submission (rear-naked choke)	Fight Nights Global 45	April 22, 2016	3	3:16	Ufa, Russia	Catchweight (161 lb) bout.
Win	22–7	Leonardo Laiola	TKO (punches)	Octagon Fighting Sensation 6	November 20, 2015	1	4:59	Moscow, Russia	Won the inaugural OFS Lightweight Championship.
Win	21–7	Jung Sung-jo	KO (punches)	Modern Fighting Pankration: Governor's Cup of Sakhalin 2015	October 31, 2015	1	0:11	Yuzhno-Sakhalinsk, Russia	
Win	20–7	Andre Winner	Decision (unanimous)	League S-70: Plotforma Cup 2015	August 29, 2015	3	5:00	Sochi, Russia	
Win	19–7	Helson Henriques	Decision (unanimous)	Modern Fighting Pankration: Mayor's Cup 2015	June 6, 2015	3	5:00	Khabarovsk, Russia	
Win	18–7	Mohamed Hassan Badawy	TKO (punches)	Octagon Fighting Sensation 4	May 16, 2015	2	4:19	Yaroslavl, Russia	Catchweight (162.7 lb) bout; Badawy missed weight.
Win	17–7	Clayton Henriques	Decision (unanimous)	Modern Fighting Pankration: Fight Nights 2	April 18, 2015	3	5:00	Vladivostok, Russia	
Win	16–7	Eddie Yagin	KO (head kick)	FEFoMP and Russian MMA Union: Supercup of Russia 2014	December 20, 2014	2	4:44	Khabarovsk, Russia	
Win	15–7	Mikhail Kislica	TKO (punch)	Baltic Fights: Baltic Challenge 6	November 1, 2014	1	4:41	Kaliningrad, Russia	
Win	14–7	Anatoli Angielovskyi	TKO (spinning back kick and punches)	Octogan Fighting Sensation 2	October 17, 2014	1	2:47	Yaroslavl, Russia	Return to Lightweight; Stepanyan missed weight (158.7 lb).
Loss	13–7	Mike Richman	TKO (punches)	Bellator 106	November 2, 2013	1	4:05	Long Beach, California, United States	
Loss	13–6	Justin Wilcox	Technical Submission (rear-naked choke)	Bellator 99	September 13, 2013	2	2:20	Temecula, California, United States	Bellator Season 9 Featherweight Tournament Quarterfinal.
Win	13–5	Chris Saunders	TKO (kick to the body and punches)	Bellator 92	March 7, 2013	3	3:55	Temecula, California, United States	Lightweight bout.
Loss	12–5	Marlon Sandro	Decision (majority)	Bellator 88	February 7, 2013	3	5:00	Duluth, Georgia, United States	Bellator Season 8 Featherweight Tournament Quarterfinal.
Loss	12–4	Wagnney Fabiano	Submission (armbar)	Bellator 76	October 12, 2012	1	3:24	Windsor, Ontario, Canada	Return to Featherweight. Bellator Season 7 Featherweight Tournament Quarterfinal.
Win	12–3	Akhmet Aliev	KO (punch)	League S-70: Plotforma Cup 2012	August 11, 2012	1	2:11	Sochi, Russia	Won the 2012 S-70 Lightweight Tournament.
Win	11–3	Anatoliy Pokrovsky	KO (punch)	League S-70: Russian Grand Prix 2011 (Stage 4)	May 25, 2012	3	1:50	Moscow, Russia	2012 S-70 Lightweight Tournament Semifinal.
Win	10–3	Antti Virtanen	Submission (guillotine choke)	Lappeenranta Fight Night 7	April 14, 2012	1	0:53	Lappeenranta, Finland	
Win	9–3	Yevgeniy Lakhin	KO (punch)	League S-70: Russian Grand Prix 2011 (Stage 2)	February 18, 2012	3	3:19	Omsk, Russia	2012 S-70 Lightweight Tournament Quarterfinal.
Win	8–3	Dmitriy Ushkanov	Decision (split)	Modern Fighting Pankration: Battle of Empires 1	December 17, 2011	2	5:00	Khabarovsk, Russia	
Win	7–3	Babyrbek Samiev	Submission (guillotine choke)	Universal Fighter: Fights With Rules 3	November 25, 2011	1	2:35	Ufa, Russia	Return to Lightweight.
Win	6–3	Atchin Chaoshen Ne	Decision (unanimous)	Modern Fighting Pankration: Mayor's Cup 2011	May 7, 2011	2	5:00	Khabarovsk, Russia	Featherweight debut.
Win	5–3	Aleksey Ershik	Decision (unanimous)	Modern Fighting Pankration: Amur Challenge 1	April 16, 2011	2	5:00	Blagoveshchensk, Russia	Return to Lightweight.
Win	4–3	Mikhail Drinovski	Decision (unanimous)	Northwestern League of Combat Sambo: Tournament in Memory of Private Korzun	October 23, 2010	2	5:00	Saint Petersburg, Russia	
Win	3–3	Kazbek Magomedov	TKO (punches)	Northwestern League of Combat Sambo: Tournament in Memory of Partisan German	September 11, 2010	1	3:24	Saint Petersburg, Russia	Welterweight debut.
Win	2–3	Andrei Shpota	KO (punch)	ProFC 13: Union Nation Cup 5	February 13, 2010	1	3:42	Nalchik, Russia	
Win	1–3	Djamal Kurbanov	KO (wheel kick)	Modern Fighting Pankration: Mayor's Cup 2009	November 21, 2009	3	1:09	Vladivostok, Russia	
Loss	0–3	Magomed Magomedov	Submission (rear-naked choke)	M-1 Challenge: Selections 2009 (Stage 5)	July 22, 2009	1	3:30	Saint Petersburg, Russia	
Loss	0–2	Djamal Kurbanov	Decision (unanimous)	Modern Fighting Pankration: Cup of Vladivostok 2009	April 25, 2009	3	5:00	Vladivostok, Russia	
Loss	0–1	Zagalav Mahachev	Submission (armbar)	M-1 Challenge: Selections 2009 (Stage 2)	April 19, 2009	1	4:55	Saint Petersburg, Russia	Lightweight debut.
