= Perry Filkins =

American mixed martial arts (MMA) fighter

- Born: April 3, 1988 (age 38); Millington, Michigan, United States
- Nationality: American
- Height: 6 ft 0 in (1.83 m)
- Weight: 185 lb (84 kg; 13.2 st)
- Division: Middleweight
- Reach: 75.0 in (191 cm)
- Fighting out of: Hooksett, New Hampshire, United States
- Team: Team Link NH, Miletich Fighting Systems NH (formerly)
- Years active: 2010–2014

Mixed martial arts record
- Total: 10
- Wins: 8
- By knockout: 6
- By submission: 1
- By decision: 1
- Losses: 2
- By decision: 2

Other information
- Mixed martial arts record from Sherdog

Perry Filkins (born April 3, 1988) is an American professional mixed martial artist who competed in Bellator's Middleweight division.

== Background ==
Filkins is originally from Millington, Michigan and came from a dysfunctional home. His father was a truck driver, so as a result, the young Filkins would often have to fend for himself from a young age. Athletic, Filkins played various sports at Millington High School, being the quarterback for the football team while also competing in wrestling. Filkins also enjoyed BMX and won a national title in the sport in 2007. After graduating, a former wrestling coach opened an MMA gym and invited Filkins to train. After only four months of training, Filkins made his debut in mixed martial arts.

== Mixed martial arts career ==
=== Early career ===
Filkins compiled an amateur record of 5–1 before making his professional debut in 2010 and won via TKO. After another fight with the same result, Filkins was handed his first professional loss via unanimous decision.

Filkins soon bounced back, however, winning his next four fights via TKO with one of the wins being over Strikeforce veteran, Louis Taylor. With a record of 6–1, Filkins was invited to compete in the Bellator Fighting Championships.

=== Bellator MMA ===
Filkins made his debut for Bellator on November 16, 2012, at Bellator 81 against German striker Jonas Billstein and won via unanimous decision.

Filkins was expected to face Dan Cramer at Bellator 98 on September 7, 2013, in the quarterfinal of Bellator's Season Nine Middleweight Tournament. However, Cramer withdrew from the bout, and Filkins instead faced Jeremy Kimball. Filkins won in the third and final round via rear-naked choke submission. Filkins was expected to face Brennan Ward in the semifinal at Bellator 102 on October 4, 2013. However, Filkins pulled out of the bout due to a torn PCL. Filkins was removed from the tournament and Ward instead faced Joe Pacheco in the semifinal.

Filkins next faced Dan Cramer on September 5, 2014, at Bellator 123. He lost the fight by unanimous decision.

== Mixed martial arts record ==
Professional record breakdown
9 matches	8 wins	1 loss
By knockout	6	0
By submission	1	0
By decision	1	1

Res.	Record	Opponent	Method	Event	Date	Round	Time	Location	Notes
Loss	8–2	Dan Cramer	Decision (unanimous)	Bellator 123	September 5, 2014	3	5:00	Uncasville, Connecticut, United States	
Win	8–1	Jeremy Kimball	Submission (rear-naked choke)	Bellator 98	September 7, 2013	3	4:18	Uncasville, Connecticut, United States	Bellator Season Nine Middleweight Tournament Quarterfinal
Win	7–1	Jonas Billstein	Decision (unanimous)	Bellator 81	November 16, 2012	3	5:00	Kingston, Rhode Island, United States	
Win	6–1	Louis Taylor	TKO (punches)	CZ 40: Kicking It XL at The Rock	January 27, 2012	2	4:02	Salem, New Hampshire, United States	
Win	5–1	Robert Burton	TKO (punches)	CZ 39: MMA Smackdown at The Rock	October 21, 2011	1	0:15	Salem, New Hampshire, United States	
Win	4–1	Chris Haggerty	TKO (punches)	GFL 12: Smith vs. Stone	July 15, 2011	1	4:09	Dover, New Hampshire, United States	
Win	3–1	Wilfred Santiago Jr.	TKO (knees and punches)	CZ 37: Kicking It at The Rock	April 29, 2011	2	2:53	Salem, New Hampshire, United States	
Loss	2–1	Cornelius Murray	Decision (unanimous)	CZ 36: Smashing on The Rock	January 28, 2011	3	5:00	Salem, New Hampshire, United States	Catchweight (195 lb) bout.
Win	2–0	Chris Cape	TKO (punches)	Triumph Fighter 4: Hostile	October 2, 2010	1	3:01	Milford, New Hampshire, United States	
Win	1–0	Nate Woodger	TKO (punches)	Triumph Fighter 3: Havoc	July 31, 2010	2	4:12	Milford, New Hampshire, United States	

== See also ==
- List of Bellator MMA alumni
