= Jacob Noe =

American mixed martial arts fighter

- Born: July 29, 1980 (age 46); Memphis, Tennessee, United States
- Other names: The Psycho
- Nationality: American
- Height: 6 ft 2 in (1.88 m)
- Weight: 205 lb (93 kg; 14.6 st)
- Division: Light Heavyweight; Heavyweight
- Reach: 75 in (191 cm)
- Stance: Orthodox
- Fighting out of: Memphis, Tennessee, United States
- Team: Memphis Judo & Jiu Jitsu
- Years active: 2000–2013

Mixed martial arts record
- Total: 15
- Wins: 11
- By knockout: 6
- By submission: 4
- By decision: 1
- Losses: 3
- By knockout: 2
- By submission: 1
- No contests: 1

Other information
- Notable school: Munford High School
- Mixed martial arts record from Sherdog

Jacob Noe (born July 29, 1980) is an American former professional mixed martial artist who competed in Bellator's Light Heavyweight division. A professional competitor from 2000 until 2013, he also competed for Strikeforce.

== Background ==
Noe was born in Memphis, Tennessee, and raised in Munford. Noe grew up in a rough neighborhood and began training in Karate at the age of six, and then transitioned into Tae Kwon Do when he was 17. Noe attended Munford High School. Noe was a talented football player, going to the state finals with his high school team and personally held the state record for most tackles in a single game. However, during his senior year he injured his neck in a car accident which resulted in the end of his football career. Noe then joined a local Boxing team with "Rampage" Jackson which evolved into mixed martial arts training as Jackson would teach Noe Wrestling techniques and Noe would teach Jackson striking techniques.

== Mixed martial arts career ==
=== Early career ===
Noe made his professional debut in 2000. He became more active in 2007 after a few fights to tune up his craft and didn't fight again until 2008. Noe compiled a professional record of 3–1 with one no contest before making the under card with Strikeforce.

=== Strikeforce ===
Noe faced Wes Little on November 19, 2010, at Strikeforce Challengers: Wilcox vs. Ribeiro. He won via unanimous decision.

=== Bellator ===
Noe made his Bellator debut on August 24, 2012, at Bellator 73 against Brian Albin. Noe won via corner stoppage at the end of the first round.

Noe faced Seth Petruzelli on November 19, 2010, at Bellator 85 in the quarterfinal match of the season eight light heavyweight tournament. He won via TKO in the first round.

In the semifinal, Noe faced former Sambo World Champion Mikhail Zayats on February 21, 2013, at Bellator 90. He lost the fight via submission in the first round.

Noe returned to the organization as a competitor in Bellator's Light Heavyweight Summer Series Tournament on Spike. He faced Renato Sobral in the opening round of a 4-man tournament at Bellator 96 on June 19, 2013, and won the fight via TKO in the third round.

Noe faced former Strikeforce Light Heavyweight Champion Muhammed Lawal in the finals on July 31, 2013, at Bellator 97. Noe lost via TKO in the third round.

=== Titan FC ===
In September 2014, Noe signed with Titan FC. He was expected to make his promotional debut in early 2015.

== Personal life ==
Noe is single and has 4 children.

== Championships and accomplishments ==
- Bellator Fighting Championships
  - Bellator 2013 Summer Series Light Heavyweight Tournament Runner-Up

== Mixed martial arts record ==
Professional record breakdown
15 matches	11 wins	3 losses
By knockout	6	2
By submission	4	1
By decision	1	0
No contests	1	

Res.	Record	Opponent	Method	Event	Date	Round	Time	Location	Notes
Loss	11–3 (1)	Muhammed Lawal	TKO (punches)	Bellator 97	July 31, 2013	3	2:51	Rio Rancho, New Mexico, United States	Bellator 2013 Summer Series Light Heavyweight Tournament Final.
Win	11–2 (1)	Renato Sobral	TKO (referee stoppage)	Bellator 96	June 19, 2013	3	3:32	Thackerville, Oklahoma, United States	Bellator 2013 Summer Series Light Heavyweight Tournament Semifinal.
Loss	10–2 (1)	Mikhail Zayats	Submission (armbar)	Bellator 90	February 21, 2013	1	3:38	West Valley City, Utah, United States	Bellator Season Eight Light Heavyweight Tournament Semifinal.
Win	10–1 (1)	Seth Petruzelli	TKO (punches)	Bellator 85	January 17, 2013	1	2:51	Irvine, California, United States	Bellator Season Eight Light Heavyweight Tournament Quarterfinal.
Win	9–1 (1)	Brian Albin	TKO (doctor stoppage)	Bellator 73	August 24, 2012	1	5:00	Tunica, Mississippi, United States	
Win	8–1 (1)	Chris Hawk	Submission (verbal)	EF: Empire Fights 3	June 23, 2012	1	4:08	Memphis, Tennessee, United States	
Win	7–1 (1)	Roman Pizzolato	Submission (rear-naked choke)	EF: Empire Fights 2	April 7, 2012	1	2:35	Memphis, Tennessee, United States	
Win	6–1 (1)	Chris Bell	TKO (injury)	Imperial Fighting X Series: Undisputed 2	January 14, 2012	1	3:00	Memphis, Tennessee, United States	
Win	5–1 (1)	Adrian Miles	Submission (rear-naked choke)	Prize Fight Promotions: Mid South MMA Championships 4	October 8, 2011	3	2:33	Southaven, Mississippi, United States	
Win	4–1 (1)	Chris Hawk	TKO (punches)	Prize Fight Promotions: Mid South MMA Championships 3	August 6, 2011	1	4:28	Southaven, Mississippi, United States	
Win	3–1 (1)	Wes Little	Decision (unanimous)	Strikeforce Challengers: Wilcox vs. Ribeiro	November 19, 2010	3	5:00	Jackson, Mississippi, United States	
Win	2–1 (1)	Tel Faulkner	Submission (arm-triangle choke)	Empire FC: A Night of Reckoning 4	October 9, 2010	1	1:58	Tunica, Mississippi, United States	
Loss	1–1 (1)	Goldman Butler	TKO (punches)	Cage Assault: On Edge	June 20, 2009	2	2:43	Memphis, Tennessee, United States	
NC	1–0 (1)	Matt Thomas	No contest (illegal knee)	Cage Assault: Bragging Rights	April 24, 2009	1	N/A	Memphis, Tennessee, United States	
Win	1–0	Billy MacDonald	TKO (punches)	ECL: Brawl For A Cause	November 1, 2008	1	1:08	Bixby, Oklahoma, United States	
