= Mikkel Parlo =

Danish mixed martial arts fighter

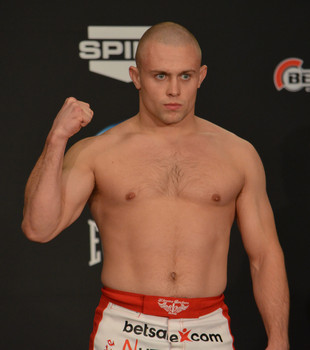
- Born: May 3, 1990 (age 36); Copenhagen, Denmark
- Nationality: Danish
- Height: 5 ft 10 in (1.78 m)
- Weight: 185 lb (84 kg; 13.2 st)
- Division: Light Heavyweight; Middleweight
- Reach: 71.0 in (180 cm)
- Fighting out of: Copenhagen, Denmark
- Team: Rumble Sports
- Years active: 2010-2016

Mixed martial arts record
- Total: 16
- Wins: 13
- By knockout: 7
- By submission: 1
- By decision: 5
- Losses: 3
- By knockout: 1
- By decision: 2

Other information
- Mixed martial arts record from Sherdog

Mikkel Parlo (born May 3, 1990) is a Danish retired mixed martial artist who last competed in the Middleweight division of Bellator MMA.

== Mixed martial arts career ==
=== Early career ===
Parlo began competing as an amateur in 2008, compiling a record of 3–0. He then started his professional career in 2010. He fought only for Danish promotions as Fighter Gala and Royal Arena.

In 2012, with a record of 8–0, Parlo signed with Bellator.

=== Bellator MMA ===
Parlo was expected face Ali Mokdad on October 12, 2012, at Bellator 76. However, Parlo was replaced by Simon Marini due to undisclosed reasons.

Parlo made his promotional debut against Jared Combs on October 26, 2012, at Bellator 78. He won via knockout in the first round.

Parlo faced Sultan Aliev on February 14, 2013, at Bellator 89 in the quarterfinals of Bellator season eight middleweight tournament. Aliev defeated Parlo via unanimous decision (29–28, 29–28, 29–28).

Parlo faced Brian Rogers on September 7, 2013, at Bellator 98 in the quarterfinals of Bellator season nine middleweight tournament. He won via unanimous decision (30–27, 30–26, 30–26).

Parlo faced Jason Butcher in the semifinal on October 4, 2013, at Bellator 102. He won the fight via unanimous decision (30–27, 29–28, 29–28).

Parlo faced Brennan Ward in the finals on November 8, 2013, at Bellator 107. Despite controlling the first round, Parlo lost the fight via a TKO in the second round.

He then faced Johnny Cisneros at Bellator 115 on April 4, 2014. Parlo won via unanimous decision.

== Championships and accomplishments ==
- Bellator MMA
  - Bellator Season 9 Middleweight Tournament Runner-Up
- Royal Arena
  - Royal Arena Middleweight Championship (One time)

== Mixed martial arts record ==
Professional record breakdown
16 matches	13 wins	3 losses
By knockout	7	1
By submission	1	0
By decision	5	2

Res.	Record	Opponent	Method	Event	Date	Round	Time	Location	Notes
Loss	13–3	Chris Honeycutt	Decision (unanimous)	Bellator 156	June 17, 2016	3	5:00	Fresno, California, United States	
Win	13–2	Abusupiyan Magomedov	Decision (unanimous)	German MMA Championship 7	November 7, 2015	3	5:00	Castrop-Rauxel, Germany	181 Pound Catchweight
Win	12–2	Johnny Cisneros	Decision (unanimous)	Bellator 115	April 4, 2014	3	5:00	Reno, Nevada, United States	
Loss	11–2	Brennan Ward	TKO (punches)	Bellator 107	November 8, 2013	2	1:39	Thackerville, Oklahoma, United States	Bellator Season 9 Middleweight Tournament Final.
Win	11–1	Jason Butcher	Decision (unanimous)	Bellator 102	October 4, 2013	3	5:00	Visalia, California, United States	Bellator Season 9 Middleweight Tournament Semifinal.
Win	10–1	Brian Rogers	Decision (unanimous)	Bellator 98	September 7, 2013	3	5:00	Charlotte, North Carolina, United States	Bellator Season 9 Middleweight Tournament Quarterfinal.
Loss	9–1	Sultan Aliev	Decision (unanimous)	Bellator 89	February 14, 2013	3	5:00	Charlotte, North Carolina, United States	Bellator Season 8 Middleweight Tournament Quarterfinal.
Win	9–0	Jared Combs	KO (punches)	Bellator 78	October 26, 2012	1	3:51	Dayton, Ohio, United States	
Win	8–0	Simon Carlsen	KO (punches)	Royal Arena 2	August 31, 2012	2	1:28	Copenhagen, Denmark	Won Royal Arena middleweight title.
Win	7–0	Martin Tondryk	TKO (kick to the body and punches)	Royal Arena 1	March 10, 2012	1	2:06	Brøndby, Denmark	
Win	6–0	Gregor Herb	Decision (unanimous)	Cage Fight Live 2	November 19, 2011	3	5:00	Herning, Denmark	
Win	5–0	Dan Edwards	KO (punch)	Fighter Gala 20: Locked & Loaded	April 2, 2011	1	0:12	Copenhagen, Denmark	
Win	4–0	Vincent del Guerra	Submission (arm-triangle choke)	Fighter Gala 18: No Fear	February 12, 2011	1	3:54	Odense, Denmark	
Win	3–0	Martin Lavin	TKO (punches)	Fighter Gala 16: Bad Boys	October 2, 2010	3	3:13	Helsingør, Denmark	
Win	2–0	Josef Kral	TKO (punches)	Fighter Gala 13: Raw	April 17, 2010	2	3:00	Copenhagen, Denmark	
Win	1–0	Willem Peters	TKO (punches)	Fighter Gala 12: Night of Champions	February 6, 2010	1	2:40	Odense, Denmark	

=== Mixed martial arts amateur record ===
Res.	Record	Opponent	Method	Event	Date	Round	Time	Location	Notes
Win	2–0	Regin Koop	Submission (rear-naked choke)	Fighter Gala 11	November 14, 2009	1	1:58	Odense, Denmark	
Win	1–0	Lars Auer	Submission	Fighter Gala 8: High Stakes	April 4, 2009	1	N/A	Odense, Denmark	
