= Munford High School =

Location
- 1080 Mclaughlin Drive; Munford, Tennessee 38058; United States
- Coordinates: 35.454°N 89.801°W

Information
- Type: Public
- Motto: We are Mumford
- School district: Tipton County School District
- Principal: Courtney Fee
- Teaching staff: 68.75 (on FTE basis)
- Grades: 9 to 12
- Enrollment: 1,273 (2023-2024)
- Student to teacher ratio: 18.52
- Colors: Maroon and White
- Mascot: Cougar
- Website: mhs.tipton-county.com

Munford High School is a public high school located in Munford, Tennessee. The school educates about 1,300 students in grades 9 to 12 in the Tipton County School District.

== General information ==
Munford High School is noted in West Tennessee for its diverse academic offerings, high quality teachers, and its commitment to athletics and the arts, most notably its band program, regarded by some to be one of the best in Tennessee. The test scores show the school to be about the state average if not above average in some areas such as math. Munford High School's English and EOC Gateway exams were the highest in the state for the 2005-2006 school year and its 2009 State Writing Assessment scores were in the 99th percentile. The principal as of September 2013 is Dr. Courtney Fee. The assistant principals are Dr. Sharon Ivie and Octavia Winfrey-Crawford.

The school's location since 1983 is 1080 McLaughlin Drive. Previously, it was located on the current site of the Munford City Hall. Its mascot is the Cougar, adopted in 1983. Previous mascots were the Black Cat and the Tiger. The yearbook at one time was called the Conqueror, at least from 1947 to 1957, but is no longer published under that name. The school graduated its first class in 1930.

== Academics ==
The school offers several academic courses, with many options in agriculture, health sciences, and industrial arts/vocational tech courses. A small number of AP courses are offered. A Dual Enrollment program with Dyersburg State Community College is also an option for some core classes, including English and History. A number of visual arts courses are offered, but few other arts courses are part of the curriculum.

== Activities ==
The school receives most recognition for its band program, established in 1946. The band has won 21 University of Memphis Bandmaster's Championships since 1995 (with 11 consecutive wins from 2007 through 2017). In 2007 the band was named USSBA Tri-State Champions, and placed 3rd in their class at the USSBA National Championships in Baltimore, MD. In 2009, the band returned to the USSBA National Championship, placing 2nd overall, as well as receiving Highest Visual Score, Highest Percussion Score, and the United States Marine Corps "Esprit de Corps" award. In 2010, the band won its first Tennessee State Championship, and was Tennessee State Champions for the second and last time in 2013. In 2011, the band went for its last and final time to the USSBA National Championship taking first place, making it the first band from the south in USSBA history to take this title. Continuing their success the band won USBands Southern States for the first time in 2012 and was defending champions again in 2016. Barry Trobaugh was the Director and Gary Fite (MHS c/o 86) as Assistant Director from 1994 to 2021. In 2025, the band recently went to the BOA Grand National Championships for the first time ever. The band is currently under the direction of Munford alum, David Stevens.

In November 2015, the marching band performed in the Macy's Thanksgiving Day Parade in New York City, NY. In 2019, the marching band performed in the Rose Parade in Pasadena, California on New Year's Day.

The school also has a baseball team, which was the 1991 state champion with a 29-1 record. The school softball team made its first state appearance at Murfreesboro in 2011 and has made back to back appearances since. The girls return in 2012 resulted in their first win at this level. In 2013, the school's advanced placement choir performed in Carnegie Hall with Z. Randall Stroope and with Foreigner as part of the band's 2013 tour.

== Notable alumni ==
- Aaron Fultz, pitcher who has played on several MLB teams, including the San Francisco Giants and the Cleveland Indians,
- Johnnie Jones, NFL and CFL football player, and a team captain for the 1984 Tennessee Volunteers football team
- Jacob Noe, football player; professional MMA fighter
- Hope Partlow, pop singer formerly on Virgin Records and Decca
