= Fabrício Guerreiro =

Brazilian mixed martial arts fighter

- Born: Fabrício de Assis Costa da Silva; July 24, 1990 (age 36); Santana, Amapá, Brazil
- Other names: Guerreiro
- Height: 5 ft 9 in (1.75 m)
- Weight: 145 lb (66 kg; 10.4 st)
- Division: Featherweight (145 lb); Lightweight (155 lb)
- Reach: 69.0 in (175 cm)
- Fighting out of: Santana, Amapá, Brazil
- Team: Ronildo Nobre Judo Club
- Rank: black belt in Judo black belt in Brazilian Jiu-Jitsu
- Years active: 2009–present

Mixed martial arts record
- Total: 28
- Wins: 22
- By knockout: 5
- By submission: 14
- By decision: 3
- Losses: 5
- By knockout: 1
- By submission: 1
- By decision: 3
- No contests: 1

Other information
- Mixed martial arts record from Sherdog

Fabrício de Assis Costa da Silva (born July 24, 1990), better known as Fabrício Guerreiro, is a Brazilian mixed martial artist who is known to have competed in Bellator's Featherweight division. A professional competitor since 2009, Guerreiro was also a contestant on The Ultimate Fighter: Brazil.

== Mixed martial arts career ==
=== Early career ===
Guerreiro started his professional career in 2009. Until 2012, he fought only in promotions within his home state of Amapá.

=== The Ultimate Fighter ===
In March 2012, Guerreiro was announced as a cast member of The Ultimate Fighter: Brazil.

Guerreiro was defeated by Rodrigo Damm during the entry round via submission due to a rear-naked choke in round two.

=== Bellator MMA ===
In November 2012, it was announced that Guerreiro had signed with Bellator.

Guerreiro made his debut against Magomedrasul Khasbulaev on February 7, 2013 at Bellator 88 in the quarterfinal match of Bellator season eight featherweight tournament. He lost via submission due to an arm-triangle choke in the second round.

Guerreiro faced Desmond Green on September 13, 2013 at Bellator 99 in the quarterfinal match of Bellator season nine featherweight tournament. He won via unanimous decision (29-28, 29-28, 29-28) and advanced to the semifinals.

Guerreiro then faced Patricio Freire in the semifinals on October 11, 2013 at Bellator 103. He lost the fight via unanimous decision (30-27, 30-27, 30-27).

Guerreiro faced Shahbulat Shamhalaev on May 17, 2014 at Bellator 120. He won the fight via submission due to a kimura in the first round.

Guerreiro was expected to face Nick Piedmont on January 16, 2015 at Bellator 132. However, Piedmont pulled out of the fight for an undisclosed reason. Guerreiro was removed from the fight card as a result.

Guerreiro faced John Teixeira at Bellator 136 on April 10, 2015. He lost the fight by split decision.

== Mixed martial arts record ==
Professional record breakdown
28 matches	22 wins	5 losses
By knockout	5	1
By submission	14	1
By decision	3	3
No contests	1	

Res.	Record	Opponent	Method	Event	Date	Round	Time	Location	Notes
Win	22–5 (1)	Ousmane Thomas Diagne	TKO (punches)	URCC 32 - Fury: Battle of the Islands	September 30, 2017	3	2:51	San Mateo, California, United States	
Loss	21–5 (1)	Efraín Escudero	Decision (unanimous)	Conquer FC 3	March 18, 2017	3	5:00	Richmond, California, United States	
Win	21–4 (1)	Will Chope	Submission (armbar)	URCC 29 - Conquest	January 7, 2017	1	1:43	San Francisco, California, United States	
Loss	20–4 (1)	John Macapá	Decision (split)	Bellator 136	April 10, 2015	3	5:00	Irvine, California, United States	
Win	20–3 (1)	Shahbulat Shamhalaev	Submission (kimura)	Bellator 120	May 17, 2014	1	3:29	Southaven, Mississippi, United States	
Loss	19–3 (1)	Patricio Freire	Decision (unanimous)	Bellator 103	October 11, 2013	3	5:00	Mulvane, Kansas, United States	Bellator season 9 featherweight tournament semifinal.
Win	19–2 (1)	Desmond Green	Decision (unanimous)	Bellator 99	September 13, 2013	3	5:00	Temecula, California, United States	Bellator season 9 featherweight tournament quarterfinal.
Win	18–2 (1)	Alisson Rodrigues	TKO (punches)	WCC: W–Combat 17	June 1, 2013	1	N/A	Macapá, Amapá, Brazil	
Loss	17–2 (1)	Magomedrasul Khasbulaev	Submission (arm-triangle choke)	Bellator 88	February 7, 2013	2	1:15	Duluth, Georgia, United States	Bellator season 8 featherweight tournament quarterfinal.
Win	17–1 (1)	Átila Lourenço	KO (punch)	Equinócio Fight 2	November 24, 2012	1	2:09	Macapá, Amapá, Brazil	
Win	16–1 (1)	Roberto da Silva	Submission (triangle choke)	WCC: W–Combat 16	August 18, 2012	1	2:17	Macapá, Amapá, Brazil	
Win	15–1 (1)	João Paulo Santos	TKO (punches)	Equinócio Fight	November 26, 2011	2	0:22	Macapá, Amapá, Brazil	
Win	14–1 (1)	Marcinei Custódio	Submission (triangle choke)	WCC: W–Combat 15	October 16, 2011	1	2:39	Macapá, Amapá, Brazil	
Win	13–1 (1)	Rafael Addario	Submission (arm-triangle choke)	King Combat	August 20, 2011	3	4:20	Macapá, Amapá, Brazil	
Loss	12–1 (1)	Rafael Addario	TKO (punches)	WCC: W–Combat 14	July 16, 2011	1	0:48	Macapá, Amapá, Brazil	
Win	12–0 (1)	Adson Lira	Submission (armbar)	Iron Man Vale Tudo 22	June 19, 2011	3	4:20	Macapá, Amapá, Brazil	
Win	11–0 (1)	João Paulo Rodrigues	TKO (punches)	Ecofight 13	March 14, 2011	2	2:15	Macapá, Amapá, Brazil	
NC	10–0 (1)	Jadison Dimitry	No contest	Macapá Martial Arts	April 9, 2011	N/A	N/A	Macapá, Amapá, Brazil	
Win	10–0	Carlos Augusto	Submission (rear-naked choke)	Ultimate Finus Fighting 3	January 15, 2011	3	5:00	Macapá, Amapá, Brazil	
Win	9–0	Tiago Trator	Submission (rear-naked choke)	Ecofight 12	December 11, 2010	3	2:45	Macapá, Amapá, Brazil	
Win	8–0	Eliel dos Santos	Decision (unanimous)	Ecofight 12	December 11, 2010	2	5:00	Macapá, Amapá, Brazil	
Win	7–0	Glaucker Arrada	Submission (armbar)	Ultimate Finus Fighting 2	November 6, 2010	1	1:41	Macapá, Amapá, Brazil	
Win	6–0	Eliel dos Santos	Submission (kimura)	WCC: W–Combat 3	July 3, 2010	1	2:18	Macapá, Amapá, Brazil	
Win	5–0	Gilberto Pantoja	Submission (kimura)	WCC: W–Combat 3	July 3, 2010	2	3:35	Macapá, Amapá, Brazil	
Win	4–0	Jefferson Alves	Submission (armbar)	Ultimate Finus Fighting 1	June 18, 2010	1	2:28	Macapá, Amapá, Brazil	
Win	3–0	Renenson Costa	Submission (keylock)	WCC: W–Combat	March 13, 2010	1	4:10	Macapá, Amapá, Brazil	
Win	2–0	Hugo dos Santos	Submission (kimura)	MMA Evolution 3	July 4, 2009	1	4:00	Macapá, Amapá, Brazil	
Win	1–0	Antônio Carlos	Submission (armbar)	Gladiador Fight	January 31, 2009	1	1:49	Macapá, Amapá, Brazil	

=== Mixed martial arts exhibition record ===
Exhibition record breakdown		
1 match	0 wins	1 loss
By submission	0	1

Res.	Record	Opponent	Method	Event	Date	Round	Time	Location	Notes
Loss	0–1	Rodrigo Damm	Submission (rear-naked choke)	The Ultimate Fighter: Brazil	May 13, 2012 (airdate)	2	0:00	São Paulo, Brazil	The Ultimate Fighter: Brazil elimination round.
