= Justin Torrey =

American mixed martial arts fighter

- Born: January 3, 1983 (age 43); Springfield, Massachusetts, United States
- Nationality: American
- Height: 6 ft 0 in (1.83 m)
- Weight: 185 lb (84 kg; 13.2 st)
- Division: Middleweight (185 lb); Welterweight (170 lb)
- Reach: 71.0 in (180 cm)
- Fighting out of: Springfield, Massachusetts, United States
- Team: Fighting Arts Academy
- Years active: 2003–2004, 2007–2010, 2013–present

Mixed martial arts record
- Total: 9
- Wins: 7
- By knockout: 6
- By decision: 1
- Losses: 2
- By knockout: 1
- By decision: 1

Other information
- Occupation: U.S. Marine (formerly)
- Mixed martial arts record from Sherdog

Justin Torrey (born January 3, 1983) is an American mixed martial artist currently competing in the Middleweight division of the World Series of Fighting. He is based out of Springfield, Massachusetts, and has been a professional competitor since 2003, he has formerly competed for Bellator.

== Background ==
Torrey has served as a U.S. Marine in Iraq. Lance Cpl. Justin D. Torrey, 23, assigned to 1st Battalion, 25th Marine Regiment arrived to take over for his younger brother, Lance Cpl. James M. Torrey, 19, assigned to 2nd Battalion, 6th Marine Regiment. The two battalions were swapping out duties in Fallujah, where the two were based.

Torrey also suffered a car accident, which has kept him away from mixed martial arts for a long period between 2010 and 2013.

== Mixed martial arts career ==
=== Early career ===
Torrey started his professional career in 2003. He fought only for Massachusetts-based organization Mass Destruction, amassing a record of three victories and no losses.

=== Extreme Fighting International ===
After years absent from mixed martial arts, Torrey fought against Elias Rivera on April 14, 2007, at EFI: Uprising. He defeated Rivera via knockout in the first round.

Torrey next faced Alexandre Moreno on August 25, 2008, at EFI: International Beatdown for the middleweight title. He won via TKO in the first round and became the EFI middleweight champion.

=== Bellator Fighting Championships ===
Torrey made his promotional debut against Matt Makowski on June 12, 2009, at Bellator 11. He won via unanimous decision.

Torrey faced Lance Everson on May 6, 2010, at Bellator 17. He won via TKO in round two.

Torrey was expected to face Andreas Spång in the quarterfinal match of Bellator season nine middleweight tournament on September 7, 2013, at Bellator 98. However, Spång had to pull out due to undisclosed reasons and Torrey instead faced Brennan Ward at the same event. Torrey had his first career's defeat via TKO in the second round.

Torrey was released from Bellator on August 25, 2014.

=== World Series of Fighting ===
Torrey made his debut for the World Series of Fighting promotion on October 17, 2015, at WSOF 24. He faced Rex Harris and lost the bout via split decision.

== Championships and accomplishments ==
=== Mixed martial arts ===
- Extreme Fighting International
  - EFI middleweight title (one time)

== Mixed martial arts record ==
Professional record breakdown
9 matches	7 wins	2 losses
By knockout	6	1
By decision	1	1

Res.	Record	Opponent	Method	Event	Date	Round	Time	Location	Notes
Loss	7–2	Rex Harris	Decision (split)	WSOF 24	October 17, 2015	3	5:00	Mashantucket, Connecticut, United States	
Loss	7–1	Brennan Ward	TKO (punches)	Bellator 98	September 7, 2013	2	3:28	Uncasville, Connecticut, United States	Bellator Season Nine Middleweight Tournament Quarterfinal.
Win	7–0	Lance Everson	TKO (punches)	Bellator 17	May 6, 2010	2	3:55	Boston, Massachusetts, United States	187 lb Catchweight bout; Everson missed weight.
Win	6–0	Matt Makowski	Decision (unanimous)	Bellator 11	June 12, 2009	3	5:00	Uncasville, Connecticut, United States	Welterweight bout.
Win	5–0	Alexandre Moreno	TKO (punches)	EFI: International Beatdown	August 25, 2008	1	4:34	Springfield, Massachusetts, United States	Won EFI Middleweight Championship.
Win	4–0	Elias Rivera	KO (punch)	EFI: Uprising	April 14, 2007	1	N/A	Springfield, Massachusetts, United States	
Win	3–0	Louis Hicks	TKO (punches)	Mass Destruction 17	August 28, 2004	2	N/A	Boston, Massachusetts, United States	
Win	2–0	Mat Santos	TKO (punches)	Mass Destruction 15	February 21, 2004	1	3:37	Boston, Massachusetts, United States	
Win	1–0	Brian Knoth	KO (punches)	Mass Destruction 14	December 13, 2003	1	N/A	Taunton, Massachusetts, United States	
