= Dan Cramer =

American mixed martial arts fighter

- Born: Daniel John Cramer; October 31, 1985 (age 40); Stamford, Connecticut, United States
- Height: 6 ft 1 in (1.85 m)
- Weight: 185 lb (84 kg; 13.2 st)
- Division: Light Heavyweight; Middleweight
- Reach: 75 in (191 cm)
- Fighting out of: Coconut Creek, Florida, United States
- Team: American Top Team
- Years active: 2009–2014

Mixed martial arts record
- Total: 15
- Wins: 11
- By knockout: 2
- By decision: 9
- Losses: 4
- By knockout: 2
- By decision: 2

Other information
- Mixed martial arts record from Sherdog

Daniel John Cramer (born October 31, 1985) is an American retired mixed martial artist. A professional from 2009 until 2014, Cramer made his professional debut with the Ultimate Fighting Championships (UFC) and was a competitor on SpikeTV's The Ultimate Fighter: Team Rampage vs Team Forrest. However, Cramer is perhaps best remembered for his 10-fight stint for Bellator.

== Biography ==
Cramer graduated from Bethel High School, in his hometown of Bethel, Connecticut, in 2003. Cramer then attended the University of Connecticut, where he earned a bachelor's degree in economics. While attending college, he played on the rugby team and was captain of the hockey team. After graduating, Cramer was employed as a manager for a local country club.

== Mixed martial arts career ==
Cramer began training Brazilian Jiu Jitsu at the age of sixteen. He later started his mixed martial arts training with the American Top Team of Connecticut and Best Way Brazilian Jiu Jitsu led by Luigi Mondelli, a five time Pan Am Jiu Jitsu champion.

Before being on The Ultimate Fighter, Cramer held a 3-0 amateur record. After the filming of The Ultimate Fighter, Cramer moved to Coconut Creek, Florida, to train with the main American Top Team academy.

=== The Ultimate Fighter ===
Cramer was a contestant on the seventh season of The Ultimate Fighter. In order for the fighters to make it on the show, they had to win an elimination fight. Cramer won his elimination round fight against Jeremiah Riggs via unanimous decision. Cramer was selected to be a part of Team Rampage.

Cramer then defeated Luke Zachrich by technical knockout in the second round. In the semi-final matchup, Cramer was paired off against Team Forrest's first pick, Tim Credeur. Credeur submitted Cramer with a heel hook to end Cramer's run in the tournament. After the fight, Cramer said he made a rookie mistake and he should have won the fight.

=== Ultimate Fighting Championship ===
Cramer was set to make his debut at The Ultimate Fighter: Team Rampage vs Team Forrest Finale against former castmate Cale Yarbrough. Cramer broke his collar bone and was forced to withdraw from the fight.

In Cramer's professional MMA and UFC debut, he defeated Matt Arroyo at UFC 94: St. Pierre vs. Penn 2, and won the fight by split decision. The judges scored the fight (29-28, 28-29, 29-28).

Cramer next fought his former Ultimate Fighter castmate Matthew Riddle at UFC 101. He lost the bout by unanimous decision. The judges scored the bout 29-27, 30-26 and 30-27. Cramer was cut from the UFC after his loss to Riddle.

=== Bellator Fighting Championships ===
After leaving the UFC, Cramer recorded a pair of wins before he signed to fight Dennis Olson in a middleweight contest that took place at Bellator 15. Cramer dominated the bout, and won via unanimous decision with all three judges giving him a 30–27 win.

Cramer fought fellow TUF alumnus, Dante Rivera, for a one-off show from Bellator at Great Adventure in New Jersey. After three very close rounds, the fight went to the judges and Rivera was awarded the win via split decision (30-27, 30-27, 28-29). Judge Doug Crosby was the only dissenting voice on the cards, scoring the fight 29-28 to Cramer. Many spectators believed Cramer won, even booing the hometown favorite Rivera.

He returned to Bellator for its last season three event, Bellator 34, against Igor Almeida. Cramer defeated Almeida via TKO (cut) at 2:36 of round one. That was Cramer's first professional win via stoppage.

At Bellator 39, Cramer fought Greg Rebello at the Mohegan Sun casino in Uncasville, Connecticut. He won via unanimous decision.

Cramer made his fourth Bellator appearance at Bellator 46 against Josh Samman. Cramer controlled the entirety of the fight, and won the fight via unanimous decision. Cramer brought his undefeated Bellator record to 4-0.

Cramer was expected to fight John Clarke on August 20, 2011, in Uncasville, Connecticut, at Bellator 48. This was Cramer's fifth Bellator appearance. Clarke, however, withdrew due to an injury and Cramer faced newcomer Jeff "The Wolfman" Nader. Cramer dominated the fight throughout two rounds before losing via TKO in the third round.

At Bellator 63, Cramer rematched Jeff "The Wolfman" Nader on the preliminary portion of the card. The event took place March 30, 2012, in Uncasville, Connecticut. He won the fight via split decision.

Cramer defeated Joe Lamoureux at Bellator 81 on November 16, 2012, via KO in round one.

Bellator MMA announced Cramer as a competitor in the Season Eight Middleweight tournament, at Bellator 89 Cramer defeated Brian Rogers via unanimous decision in the Quarterfinal bout. He faced Brett Cooper in the semifinals on March 7, 2013, at Bellator 92. Despite winning the first two rounds, Cramer lost via TKO in the third round.

Cramer was then expected to face Perry Filkins at Bellator 98 on September 7, 2013, in the quarterfinals of Bellator's Season Nine Middleweight Tournament. Cramer, however, withdrew from the bout and was replaced with Jeremy Kimball. Cramer was expected to face Doug Marshall at Bellator 115 on April 4, 2014, in Bellator's Season Ten Middleweight Tournament. Marshall pulled out due to a current suspension and was replaced by Jeremy Kimball. However, Kimball missed weight prior to the bout and the fight was cancelled.

Cramer faced Perry Filkins at Bellator 123 on September 5, 2014. He won the fight via unanimous decision.

== Mixed martial arts record ==
Professional record breakdown
15 matches	11 wins	4 losses
By knockout	2	2
By submission	0	0
By decision	9	2

Res.	Record	Opponent	Method	Event	Date	Round	Time	Location	Notes
Win	11–4	Perry Filkins	Decision (unanimous)	Bellator 123	September 5, 2014	3	5:00	Uncasville, Connecticut, United States	
Loss	10–4	Brett Cooper	TKO (punches)	Bellator 92	March 7, 2013	3	3:19	Temecula, California, United States	Bellator Season Eight Middleweight Tournament Semifinal.
Win	10–3	Brian Rogers	Decision (unanimous)	Bellator 89	February 14, 2013	3	5:00	Charlotte, North Carolina, United States	Bellator Season Eight Middleweight Tournament Quarterfinal.
Win	9–3	Joe Lamoureux	KO (punches)	Bellator 81	November 16, 2012	1	3:26	Kingston, Rhode Island, United States	
Win	8–3	Jeff Nader	Decision (split)	Bellator 63	March 30, 2012	3	5:00	Uncasville, Connecticut, United States	Return to Middleweight.
Loss	7–3	Jeff Nader	TKO (punches)	Bellator 48	August 20, 2011	3	1:04	Uncasville, Connecticut, United States	Light Heavyweight debut.
Win	7–2	Josh Samman	Decision (unanimous)	Bellator 46	June 25, 2011	3	5:00	Hollywood, Florida, United States	
Win	6–2	Greg Rebello	Decision (unanimous)	Bellator 39	April 2, 2011	3	5:00	Uncasville, Connecticut, United States	
Win	5–2	Igor Almeida	TKO (doctor stoppage)	Bellator 34	October 28, 2010	1	2:36	Hollywood, Florida, United States	
Loss	4–2	Dante Rivera	Decision (split)	Elite MMA Mayhem 1	June 19, 2010	3	5:00	Jackson, New Jersey, United States	
Win	4–1	Dennis Olson	Decision (unanimous)	Bellator 15	April 22, 2010	3	5:00	Uncasville, Connecticut, United States	
Win	3–1	Ever Nunez	Decision (unanimous)	Action Fight League 2	March 5, 2010	3	5:00	Hollywood, Florida, United States	
Win	2–1	Ron Jackson	Decision (unanimous)	C3 Fights 18	December 11, 2009	3	5:00	Red Rock, Oklahoma, United States	
Loss	1–1	Matthew Riddle	Decision (unanimous)	UFC 101	August 8, 2009	3	5:00	Philadelphia, Pennsylvania, United States	
Win	1–0	Matt Arroyo	Decision (split)	UFC 94	January 31, 2009	3	5:00	Las Vegas, Nevada, United States	

== See also ==
- List of Bellator MMA alumni
