= Vyacheslav Vasilevsky =

Russian mixed martial arts fighter

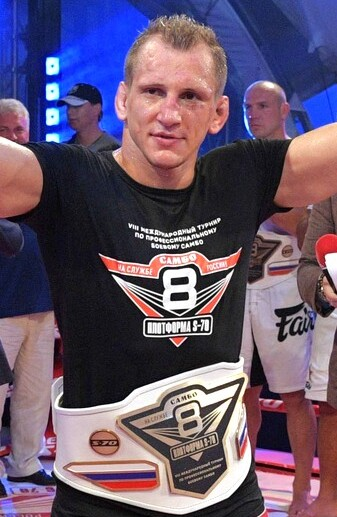
- Vasilevsky in 2016
- Born: June 16, 1988 (age 38); Zelenogorsk, Russian SFSR, USSR
- Native name: Вячеслав Василевский
- Other names: The Crushin Russian
- Height: 5 ft 10 in (1.78 m)
- Weight: 185 lb (84 kg; 13.2 st); 205 lb (93 kg; 14.6 st)
- Division: Light Heavyweight; Middleweight; Welterweight
- Reach: 74 in (188 cm)
- Fighting out of: Fairfield, New Jersey, U.S. Saint Petersburg, Leningrad, Russia
- Team: Red Fury fight team Tiger Muay Thai; Fightspirit Team
- Rank: Master of Sport in combat sambo Purple belt in Brazilian jiu-jitsu
- Years active: 2008–present

Mixed martial arts record
- Total: 47
- Wins: 36
- By knockout: 14
- By submission: 10
- By decision: 12
- Losses: 11
- By knockout: 6
- By submission: 2
- By decision: 3

Other information
- Mixed martial arts record from Sherdog

Vyacheslav Nikolaevich Vasilevsky is a Russian professional mixed martial artist and sambo competitor. He has competed in professional MMA since 2008. He was the inaugural M-1 Global Light Heavyweight World Champion and also fought for Bellator MMA and Absolute Championship Akhmat. Vasilevsky is a multi-time world champion and Master of Sport in combat sambo.

== Competitive career ==
Vasilevsky was born and raised in the Siberian closed town of Zelenogorsk, Krasnoyarsk Krai. He began training in judo at age nine, ultimately becoming the junior judo champion of Krasnoyarsk Krai, a national youth judo championship medalist, and the judo champion of Siberia as an adult. By age 19, he was training in boxing and combat sambo, and his success in combat sambo led to invitations to compete in MMA.

Vasilevsky made his debut with a first-round submission victory over Ladislav Zak via rear naked choke.

His next fight was against Daniel Tabera which he lost by unanimous decision.

=== M-1 Global ===
Vasilevsky's road to the 2010 M-1 Global Light Heavyweight Championship started with a split decision victory over Sergey Guzev. Two other bouts in the selection – against Xavier Foupa-Pokam and Shamil Tinagadjiev went into the third round, though he also achieved a first-round victory over Alihan Magomedov. By contrast, none of Tomasz Narkun's professional fights had gone beyond the first round.

Vyacheslav Vasilevsky defeated Tomasz Narkun via second-round TKO at M-1 Challenge XXII to become the inaugural M-1 Global Light Heavyweight Champion. However, after the fight, Vasilevsky moved down to middleweight.

=== Bellator MMA ===
Vasilevsky signed with Bellator after a successful career in Russia where he compiled a 15-1 record.

Vyacheslav faced Victor O'Donnell on March 16 at Bellator LXI in a middleweight tournament bout. He won the fight via unanimous decision to advance to the semifinal round.

In the semifinal round, Vyacheslav faced Maiquel Falcão on April 20 at Bellator LXVI. He lost the fight via unanimous decision.

Vasilevsky was expected to face Doug Marshall in the Bellator Season Eight Middleweight tournament before being replaced by Andreas Spang.

=== Return to M-1 Global ===
Vasilevsky defeated Charles Andrade on May 23, 2013 at M-1 Challenge 39. He won via unanimous decision. Vasilevsky then faced Vitor Nobrega on October 20, 2013 at M-1 Challenge 42. He won by TKO via punches in the first round.

He then faced Ramazan Emeev for M-1 Challenge Middleweight Championship at M-1 Challenge 51 on September 7, 2014. Vasilevsky won the fight via TKO in the fourth round.

Vasilevsky faced former Bellator MMA Middleweight Champion Alexander Shlemenko on February 19, 2016 at M-1 Challenge 68. He lost this fight via split decision.

Vasilevsky returned to M-1 four months later to replace the injured Ramazan Emeev against Alexander Shlemenko in a rematch on June 16, 2016 at M-1 Challenge 64. Shlemenko won the fight via guillotine choke in the third round.

=== Absolute Championship Berkut ===
In September 2016, Vasilevsky signed with the ACB. He was expected to face Albert Duraev on April 15, 2017 at the ACB 57: Payback for the vacant middleweight title. However, Duraev pulled out of the fight on 7 April and was replaced by Ibragim Chuzhigaev.

Vasilevsky faced Will Noland on July 22, 2017 at ACB 65: Silva vs. Agnaev. He won the fight via submission in the first round.

== Championships and accomplishments ==
=== Mixed martial arts ===
- Bellator Fighting Championships
  - Bellator Season 6 Middleweight Tournament Semifinalist
- M-1 Global
  - M-1 Challenge Light Heavyweight Championship (One time; first)
  - M-1 Challenge Middleweight Championship (One time)
  - 2010 M-1 Selection Eastern European Light Heavyweight Tournament Winner
- Mix Fight Combat
  - MFC European Middleweight Championship (One time; first)

=== Sambo ===
- Fédération Internationale Amateur de Sambo
  - 2017 FIAS World Combat Sambo Championships Gold Medalist
  - 2015 FIAS World Combat Sambo Championships Gold Medalist
  - 2013 FIAS World Combat Sambo Championships Gold Medalist
  - 2012 FIAS World Combat Sambo Championships Gold Medalist
  - 2010 FIAS World Combat Sambo Championships Gold Medalist
  - 2009 FIAS World Combat Sambo Championships Gold Medalist
- European Sambo Federation
  - 2014 European Combat Sambo Championships Gold Medalist
  - 2008 European Combat Sambo Championships Gold Medalist
- All-Russia Sambo Federation
  - Russian Combat Sambo National Championship (2009, 2010, 2012, 2013, 2015)
  - Russian Combat Sambo National Championship Runner-up (2008, 2014)
  - 2010 Baltic Cup Combat Sambo Silver Medalist
  - 2009 S.D. Seliverstova Memorial Combat Sambo Gold Medalist
  - 2008 A.A. Kharlampiev Memorial Combat Sambo Gold Medalist

== Mixed martial arts record ==
Professional record breakdown
47 matches	36 wins	11 losses
By knockout	14	6
By submission	10	2
By decision	12	3

Res.	Record	Opponent	Method	Event	Date	Round	Time	Location	Notes
Loss	36–11	Mikhail Rogozin	TKO (punches)	RCC 24	December 12, 2025	1	0:43	Yekaterinburg, Russia	
Loss	36–10	Sharaf Davlatmurodov	TKO (punches)	Ural FC 10	August 16, 2025	1	0:40	Perm, Russia	
Win	36–9	Islam Zhangorazov	Decision (unanimous)	Hardcore MMA 22	February 17, 2022	3	5:00	Moscow, Russia	
Loss	35–9	David Barkhudaryan	TKO (punches)	AMC Fight Nights 102	June 18, 2021	1	3:05	Krasnoyarsk, Russia	
Win	35–8	Viscardi Andrade	Decision (unanimous)	RCC 9	May 3, 2021	3	5:00	Yekaterinburg, Russia	Return to Middleweight.
Win	34–8	Bogdan Guskov	KO (punches)	AMC Fight Nights: Winter Cup 2020	December 24, 2020	1	3:01	Moscow, Russia	Light Heavyweight bout.
Loss	33–8	Murad Abdulaev	TKO (elbows)	ACA 99	September 27, 2019	2	3:46	Moscow, Russia	Welterweight debut.
Loss	33–7	Magomed Ismailov	TKO (punches)	ACA 95	April 27, 2019	1	2:20	Moscow, Russia	
Win	33–6	Wagner Silva	TKO (punches)	Union of Veterans: Cup of Friendship 2018	November 24, 2018	1	1:42	Novosibirsk, Russia	
Loss	32–6	Albert Duraev	TKO (punches)	ACB 77	December 23, 2017	1	3:47	Moscow, Russia	For the vacant ACB Middleweight Championship.
Win	32–5	Luis Sergio Melo Jr.	TKO (punches)	League S-70: Plotforma Cup 2017	August 8, 2017	2	3:10	Sochi, Russia	
Win	31–5	Will Noland	Submission (rear-naked choke)	ACB 65	July 22, 2017	1	4:56	Sheffield, England	
Win	30–5	Ibragim Chuzhigaev	Submission (rear-naked choke)	ACB 57	April 15, 2017	2	3:20	Moscow, Russia	
Win	29–5	Matt Horwich	Decision (unanimous)	Fightspirit Championship 6	September 4, 2016	3	5:00	Saint Petersburg, Russia	
Loss	28–5	Alexander Shlemenko	Submission (guillotine choke)	M-1 Challenge 68	16 June 2016	3	2:09	Saint Petersburg, Russia	2016 M-1 Global Middleweight Grand Prix Final. Fight of the Night.
Win	28–4	Charles Andrade	Decision (unanimous)	PRIDE Fighting Show 1	April 23, 2016	3	5:00	Nizhny Novgorod, Russia	Catchweight (194 lb) bout.
Loss	27–4	Alexander Shlemenko	Decision (split)	M-1 Challenge 64	February 19, 2016	3	5:00	Moscow, Russia	2016 M-1 Global Middleweight Grand Prix Semifinal. Fight of the Night.
Win	27–3	Kristijan Perak	Submission (rear-naked choke)	M-1 Challenge 62	October 10, 2015	2	1:02	Sochi, Russia	
Loss	26–3	Ramazan Emeev	Submission (rear-naked choke)	M-1 Challenge 56	April 10, 2015	1	1:48	Moscow, Russia	Lost the M-1 Global Middleweight Championship.
Win	26–2	German Yakubov	Decision (unanimous)	Russian Martial Arts Union: Battle of the Champions 7	November 21, 2014	3	5:00	Moscow, Russia	
Win	25–2	Ramazan Emeev	TKO (punches)	M-1 Challenge 51	September 7, 2014	4	4:41	Saint Petersburg, Russia	Won the M-1 Global Middleweight Championship.
Win	24–2	Maiquel Falcão	TKO (punches)	League S-70: Plotforma Cup 2014	August 9, 2014	1	0:37	Sochi, Russia	
Win	23–2	Vitor Nobrega	TKO (punches)	M-1 Challenge 42	October 20, 2013	1	2:45	Saint Petersburg, Russia	
Win	22–2	Trevor Prangley	TKO (punches)	League S-70: Plotforma Cup 2013	August 18, 2013	3	2:32	Sochi, Russia	Catchweight (192 lb) bout.
Win	21–2	Charles Andrade	Decision (unanimous)	M-1 Challenge 39	May 23, 2013	3	5:00	Moscow, Russia	
Win	20–2	Yuri Kalminin	Submission (rear-naked choke)	Shield and Sword Cup 2012	November 23, 2012	1	3:00	Nizhni Novgorod, Russia	
Win	19–2	Jorge Luis Bezerra	TKO (punches)	League S-70: Plotforma Cup 2012	August 15, 2012	1	2:46	Sochi, Russia	
Win	18–2	Svetoslav Savov	TKO (punches)	League S-70: 2011 Russian Grand Prix 4	May 15, 2012	2	1:38	Moscow, Russia	
Loss	17–2	Maiquel Falcão	Decision (unanimous)	Bellator 66	April 20, 2012	3	5:00	Cleveland, United States	Bellator Season Six Middleweight Tournament Semifinal.
Win	17–1	Victor O'Donnell	Decision (unanimous)	Bellator 61	March 16, 2012	3	5:00	Bossier City, United States	Bellator Season Six Middleweight Tournament Quarterfinal.
Win	16–1	Andrey Kalashnikov	Submission (rear-naked choke)	Shield and Sword Cup 2011	October 20, 2011	1	2:15	Nizhny Novgorod, Russia	
Win	15–1	Robert Jocz	Decision (unanimous)	Pro Fight MMA 6	June 4, 2011	3	5:00	Włocławek, Poland	
Win	14–1	Tomas Kuzela	Submission (rear-naked choke)	Mix Fight Tournament: Fedor Emelianenko Cup 2011	May 22, 2011	1	4:04	Nizhny Novgorod, Russia	
Win	13–1	Enoc Solves Torres	Decision (unanimous)	League S-70: Russia vs. Spain	April 21, 2011	3	5:00	Moscow, Russia	
Win	12–1	Andy Sidaminou	TKO (punches)	Baltic Fights: Baltic Challenge 1	March 25, 2011	1	3:23	Kaliningrad, Russia	Return to Middleweight.
Win	11–1	Tomasz Narkun	TKO (retirement)	M-1 Challenge 22	December 10, 2010	2	2:20	Moscow, Russia	Won the inaugural M-1 Global Light Heavyweight Championship.
Win	10–1	Shamil Tinagadjiev	Decision (unanimous)	M-1 Global: Battle on the Neva 4	August 19, 2010	3	5:00	Saint Petersburg, Russia	Won the 2010 M-1 Selection Eastern European Tournament.
Win	9–1	Xavier Foupa-Pokam	Submission (rear-naked choke)	League S-70: Plotforma Cup 2010	July 14, 2010	3	1:58	Sochi, Russia	Middleweight bout.
Win	8–1	Alihan Magomedov	Submission (rear-naked choke)	M-1 Selection 2010: Eastern Europe Round 3	May 28, 2010	1	3:21	Kyiv, Ukraine	2010 M-1 Selection Eastern European Tournament Semifinal.
Win	7–1	Sebastian Libebe	TKO (punches)	Kstovo Sambo Federation: Kstovo Mix Fight 2010	May 6, 2010	1	3:20	Kstovo, Russia	Won the MFC European Light Heavyweight Championship.
Win	6–1	Sergey Guzev	Decision (split)	M-1 Selection 2010: Eastern Europe Round 2	April 10, 2010	3	5:00	Kyiv, Ukraine	Return to Light Heavyweight. 2010 M-1 Selection Eastern European Tournament Quarterfinal.
Win	5–1	Artur Korchemny	Submission (punches)	M-1 Challenge 20	December 3, 2009	1	2:20	Saint Petersburg, Russia	Middleweight debut.
Win	4–1	Pavel Nohynek	TKO (punches)	Gladiator 2009	May 23, 2009	2	2:02	Prague, Czech Republic	
Win	3–1	Abdula Mutalimov	TKO (punches)	M-1 Challenge 2009: Selections 2	April 19, 2009	1	1:29	Saint Petersburg, Russia	
Win	2–1	Akhmed Guseinov	Decision (unanimous)	Kstovo Sambo Federation: Mix Fight 2008	November 6, 2008	2	5:00	Nizhny Novgorod, Russia	
Loss	1–1	Daniel Tabera	Decision (unanimous)	The Fights of Leaders: Team Europe vs. Team Russia	August 29, 2008	3	5:00	Perm, Russia	
Win	1–0	Ladislav Zak	Submission (rear-naked choke)	Gladiator: Gladiator of Milovice	May 24, 2008	1	2:56	Milovice, Czech Republic	Light Heavyweight debut.

Except where otherwise indicated, details provided in the record box are taken from Sherdog.

== See also ==
- List of Bellator MMA alumni
- List of male mixed martial artists
