= Andreas Spång =

Swedish mixed martial arts fighter (born 1978)

- Born: Andreas Christian Spång; November 7, 1978 (age 47); Stockholm, Sweden
- Other names: Sweet Swede
- Nationality: Swedish
- Height: 6 ft 1 in (1.85 m)
- Weight: 223.8 lb (101.5 kg; 15.99 st)
- Division: Heavyweight; Middleweight
- Fighting out of: Las Vegas, Nevada, United States
- Team: J-Sect MMA; One Kick's Gym
- Years active: 2008-present

Mixed martial arts record
- Total: 12
- Wins: 9
- By knockout: 3
- By submission: 3
- By decision: 3
- Losses: 3
- By knockout: 1
- By submission: 1
- By decision: 1

Other information
- Notable relatives: Chris Spang (brother)
- Boxing record from BoxRec
- Mixed martial arts record from Sherdog

Andreas Christian Spång (born November 7, 1978) is a Swedish professional mixed martial arts (MMA) fighter who last competed in 2014. A professional competitor since 2008, he has competed for Bellator, the MFC, and Strikeforce.

== Personal life ==
Andreas Spang first learned boxing at the age of three from his father who had been an amateur boxer in Sweden. As he stated in a Bellator interview, Spang says, "It is important to be a role model for my family." He lives with his wife and young son in Las Vegas, Nevada.

Spang defines himself as a "striker by nature." As an amateur boxer, Spang has a record of 15-5 and went 1-0 as a professional K-1 fighter.

== Mixed martial arts career ==
=== Early career ===
Spang made his professional MMA debut on April 5, 2008 when he fought at the Fight Fiesta de Luxe: Unstoppable event in Luxembourg and won his first match via unanimous decision. Sprang quickly rose up the middleweight ranks, compiling a 5-0 record. 6 of his 8 victories have been by knockout or submission win, all in the first round.

=== Bellator Fighting Championships ===
Andreas Spang is currently signed to Bellator Fighting Championships and competed in their season six middleweight tournament. Spang welcomed the opportunity to fight in the Bellator middleweight tournament when he replaced Bruno Santos, who was originally scheduled to face Rogers.

Spang made his Bellator debut at Bellator 66 on April 21, 2012 in a middleweight tournament semifinal match, where he defeated the highly aggressive Brian "The Predator" Rogers with an impressive come-from-behind KO victory.

He faced Maiquel Falcão in the finals at Bellator 69. After rocking Maiquel Falcão in the first round, Spang was controlled by Falcão's wrestling for the remainder of the fight and lost via unanimous decision.

In January 2013, Bellator announced Spang as a competitor in the Season Eight Middleweight tournament. His Quarterfinal fight took place at Bellator 89 against Doug Marshall. He lost via knock out in the first round.

=== World Series of Fighting ===
On July 15, 2015, it was announced that Spång signed with the World Series of Fighting to compete in the Light Heavyweight division.

== Controversy ==
Spang was involved in a post-fight scuffle which marred his comeback at Bellator 66. Maiquel Falcão who had fought earlier that night defeating Vyacheslav Vasilevsky to secure his own spot in the middleweight finals, was brought into the cage to do a face-off with Spang for the first time after Spang's fight. When they moved in close to each other, Spang immediately shoved Falcão. Startled by this, the much publicized temperament of Falcão rushed back at him with a knee to the ribcage and then lifted up his hand as if looking to throw a punch. Officials, Bellator commentator/former fighter Jimmy Smith and fight matchmaker Sam Caplan separated the two from one another.

Spang, who also shoved Brian Rogers at Thursday's event during the fight's weigh-ins to get inside his opponent's head and not out of hatred, was apologetic to the crowd after the melee incident. He even apologized again at the post-fight press conference with Bellator CEO Bjorn Rebney in attendance, stating he just doesn't like people getting up in his face.

Disciplinary action from the Ohio Athletic Commission, which oversaw the event, will determine if any fines and/or suspensions should be lifted against both fighters.

== Kickboxing record ==
Kickboxing record
? wins (? KOs), ? losses, ? draws
Date	Result	Opponent	Event	Location	Method	Round	Time
2006-08-12	Win	(United States) Jaime Fletcher	K-1 World Grand Prix 2006 in Las Vegas II, Reserve Match	Las Vegas, Nevada, USA	Decision (majority)	3	3:00
2006-03-03	Loss	(United States) Raymond Daniels	World Combat League	United States	Decision (15-7)	1	3:00
Legend: Win Loss Draw/No contest Notes

== Mixed martial arts record ==
Professional record breakdown
12 matches	9 wins	3 losses
By knockout	3	1
By submission	3	1
By decision	3	1

Res.	Record	Opponent	Method	Event	Date	Round	Time	Location	Notes
Win	9–3	J.A. Dudley	Decision (unanimous)	Matrix Fights 9	December 5, 2014	3	5:00	Philadelphia, Pennsylvania, United States	Heavyweight debut.
Loss	8–3	Doug Marshall	KO (punch)	Bellator 89	February 14, 2013	1	3:03	Charlotte, North Carolina, United States	Bellator Season Six Middleweight Tournament Quarterfinal.
Loss	8–2	Maiquel Falcão	Decision (unanimous)	Bellator 69	May 18, 2012	3	5:00	Lake Charles, Louisiana, United States	Bellator Season Six Middleweight Tournament Final.
Win	8–1	Brian Rogers	KO (punch)	Bellator 66	April 20, 2012	2	3:34	Cleveland, Ohio, United States	Bellator Season Six Middleweight Tournament Semifinal.
Win	7–1	Willie Parks	TKO (punches)	Strikeforce Challengers 20	November 18, 2011	1	3:10	Las Vegas, Nevada, United States	
Win	6–1	Cody Krahn	Submission (guillotine choke)	MFC 30	June 10, 2011	1	1:18	Edmonton, Alberta, Canada	
Loss	5–1	Ali Mokdad	Submission (rear-naked choke)	MFC 29	April 8, 2011	1	1:35	Windsor, Ontario, Canada	
Win	5–0	Chaun Sims	TKO (punches)	Ring of Fire 38 - Ascension	June 5, 2010	1	3:38	Broomfield, Colorado, United States	
Win	4–0	B.J. Lacy	Decision (unanimous)	MMA Xplosion: Super Fight Night	February 20, 2010	3	5:00	Las Vegas, Nevada, United States	
Win	3–0	Andre Walker	Submission (guillotine choke)	Ring of Fire 36: Demolition	December 4, 2009	1	2:20	Denver, Colorado, United States	
Win	2–0	Ryan Ballingall	Submission (guillotine choke)	North American Challenge 25	June 27, 2009	1	0:54	North Vancouver, British Columbia, Canada	
Win	1–0	Karim Khalifa	Decision (unanimous)	Fight Fiesta de Luxe: Unstoppable	April 5, 2008	3	5:00	Hollerich, Luxembourg	

== Professional boxing record ==
0 Wins (0 knockouts, 0 decision), 0 Losses, 1 Draw
Res.	Record	Opponent	Type	Rd., Time	Date	Location	Notes
Draw	0-0-1	(Mexico) Alvaro Morales	MD	4 (4)	2007-05-12	Reno Events Center, Reno, Nevada, United States	
