= Alexander Shlemenko =

Russian mixed martial arts fighter

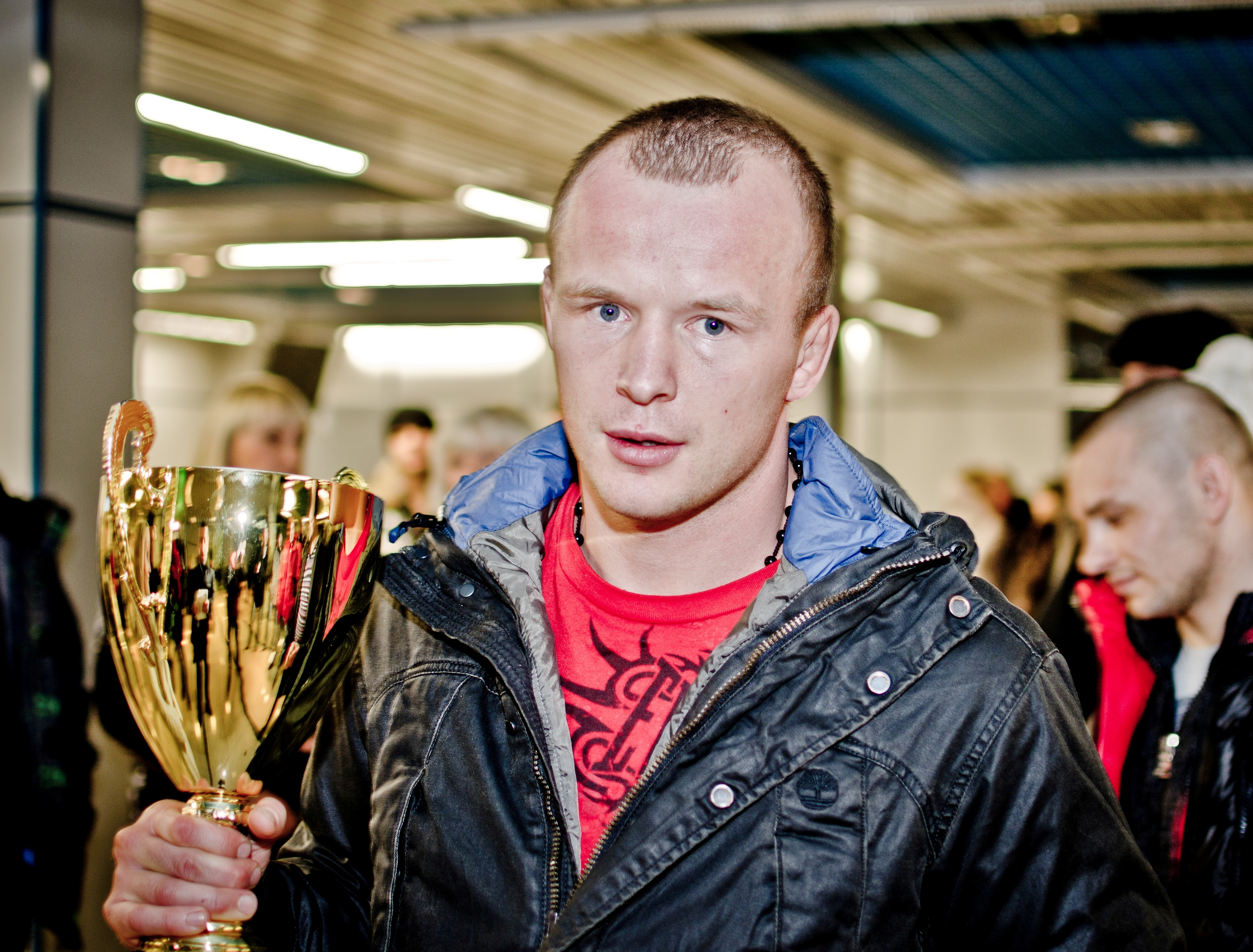
- Shlemenko in 2011 after his win against Vianna
- Born: 20 May 1984 (age 42); Omsk, Russian SFSR, Soviet Union
- Native name: Александр Шлеменко
- Other names: Storm
- Height: 5 ft 11 in (180 cm)
- Weight: 185 lb (84 kg; 13 st 3 lb)
- Division: Middleweight (2004–present); Light Heavyweight (2014)
- Reach: 71 in (180 cm)
- Style: Armeyskiy Rukopashniy Boy, Pankration
- Fighting out of: Omsk, Siberia, Russia; Lake Forest, California, U.S.
- Team: RusFighters Sport Club (Saturn MMA team); Storm Fight School
- Rank: International Master of Sport in Hand-to-hand combat Master of Sport in Armeyskiy Rukopashniy Boy
- Years active: 2004–present

Mixed martial arts record
- Total: 88
- Wins: 69
- By knockout: 36
- By submission: 13
- By decision: 20
- Losses: 17
- By knockout: 3
- By submission: 5
- By decision: 9
- Draws: 1
- No contests: 1

Other information
- University: Siberian Academy of Physical Culture
- Spouse: Alena
- Children: 5
- Notable students: Alexander Sarnavskiy; Andrey Koreshkov
- Mixed martial arts record from Sherdog

Alexander Pavlovich Shlemenko (Russian: Александр Павлович Шлеменко, born 20 May 1984) is a Russian mixed martial artist currently fighting in the Middleweight division. He is most notable for fighting for Bellator Fighting Championships, where he is the former Bellator Middleweight World Champion. Alexander is an expert in hand-to-hand combat and traditional kickboxing. He trains at the "Saturn Profi" sports club in Omsk, Russia, and holds a degree in Physical Culture (specialization – Combat Sports Trainer) at the Siberian University of Physical Culture.

== Background ==
As a teenager, Alexander did skiing and Greco-Roman wrestling. At the age of 15, Shlemenko seriously started to train ARB, which is the Russian abbreviation for "army hand-to-hand combat". He competed in many regional and national tournaments in ARB, and got to the highest sport level by reaching the title of "master of sports".

== Mixed martial arts career ==
=== Fighting for the IAFC ===
After watching a professional pankration tournament, Shlemenko immediately wanted to try it out. Shortly after that, he made his professional MMA-debut in 2004 at the age of 20 in his hometown Omsk, winning by TKO. During the early stage of his professional MMA-career, Shlemenko competed in the IAFC (International Absolute Fighting Council). Fighting as usual multiple fights per night, Alexander won most of them by knockout, which can be seen in his record. In May 2005, after only one year of his professional MMA career, Shlemenko had an impressive 15–2 record, and was gaining more and more attention by the Russian fans and the media.

=== Rise to prominence ===
After the IAFC, Shlemenko fought in various organizations such as M-1 Mixfight and BodogFight. He competed in EliteXC before the company went defunct. Its assets have been acquired by Strikeforce, having made his successful U.S. debut on their 10 October 2008 ShoXC show on Showtime.

Alexander won most of his fights, often by KO or TKO. Through the series of wins, some of his losses were corner posts for his development as a fighter and his whole MMA-career.

=== Shlemenko vs. Ronaldo "Jacaré" Souza ===
In April 2006, Alexander faced the future Strikeforce Middleweight Champion Ronaldo Souza at Jungle Fight 5. Early in the first round, Jacaré moved the fight to the ground, and got a full mount position. After some heavy ground and pound, Jacaré submitted Shlemenko by an arm triangle choke. Shlemenko didn't tap and got choked unconscious. In his blog, Alexander later said, that he lost this fight, because he was a "young fool". According to his own words, Shlemenko didn't even have a clue about fighting on the ground or grappling at all, he was still training as an ARB fighter (there is no ground game in ARB). Competing in MMA was just a hobby to gain some money while studying. After this fight, Shlemenko started to prepare himself like a professional mixed martial artist, training grappling as well.

According to one of his blogs, Shlemenko said that right now he would have a good chance to win in a rematch with "Jacaré".

=== Shlemenko vs. Jose "Pelé" Landi Jons ===
As Alexander stated during an interview in 2010, the hardest fight of his career was the rematch with Jose "Pelé" Landi Jons in September 2006. The reason for this was, that Shlemenko noticed after the first round that he has broken both of his hands, but he still continued to fight.

Jose "Pelé" Landi Jons won by a disputed decision.

=== Shlemenko vs. Jordan Radev ===
The only knockout loss of his career Alexander received from Jordan Radev, a Bulgarian Olympic wrestler and mixed martial artist. Alexander caught a heavy left hook in the second round, which knocked him out.

Later, in an interview Shlemenko said that this loss made him stronger, and gave him a lot of motivation to train harder.

=== Bellator MMA ===
In 2010, Shlemenko signed with Bellator and made his debut in the Season Two Middleweight Tournament at Bellator 16, defeating Matt Major via unanimous decision.

In the semi-finals of the tournament, Alexander defeated Jared Hess, after Hess dislocated his knee, forcing the TKO via stoppage.

Shlemenko then faced Bryan Baker in the Bellator Middleweight tournament final on 24 June 2010 at Bellator 23. He won the fight via TKO in the first round to become the Bellator Season Two Middleweight Tournament winner. In addition to a $100,000 check for winning the tournament, Shlemenko obtained a chance to fight against Hector Lombard for the Bellator Middleweight Championship title at Bellator 34 on 28 October 2010.

On 28 October 2010 at Bellator 34, Alexander Shlemenko faced Hector Lombard. Lombard controlled nearly the whole fight, landing elusive striking combinations and heavy elbows from Shlemenko's guard. Despite taking a lot of damage that would've finished most opponents, Shlemenko actively fought back and even won the 5th round on the judges scorecards with a few well placed knees, some spinning backfists and stuffing takedown attempts. This was due to Hector Lombard relying mostly on takedowns to win the rounds after Shlemenko figured out his timing on the feet.

==== Season Five Middleweight tournament ====
In the opening round of the Bellator Season Five Middleweight Tournament, Shlemenko fought Zelg Galesic, a Croatian mixed martial artist with a Tae Kwon Do background. This fight was anticipated as an interesting striking match between two experienced stand-up fighters. Despite these expectations, Alexander won via standing guillotine choke in the first round, proving his rarely seen submission skills.

In the semifinal round, Shlemenko faced Brian Rogers, an American fighter noted for many first round stoppages due to striking. Rogers came out aggressively in the first round, landing striking combinations. After a lost first round, Shlemenko started to dictate the pace of the fight early in the second round. A landed backfist, followed by heavy knee strikes to the head brought Rogers in trouble in the first half of the round. After both fighters exchanged some punches, Alexander managed to land another unanswered series of heavy knees to the head of Rogers, which forced the referee to stop the fight at 2:31 of the second round. After the fight Alexander stated in his blog, that he was rather nervous during the fight, and that he saw Brian Rogers as a very athletic and explosive opponent.

In the tournament finals, Shlemenko faced Vitor Vianna, a two-time world BJJ-champion. Nearly the whole fight Alexander dominated in stand-up punching exchanges, which brought him a win by unanimous decision. This win earned Shlemenko a rematch for the title against Hector Lombard. However, Lombard signed with the Ultimate Fighting Championship and the Bellator Middleweight Championship was vacated as a result.

==== Middleweight championship ====
On 25 April 2012, Bellator CEO Bjorn Rebney announced that the winner of the Season Six Middleweight Tournament Finale Maiquel Falcão would face Shlemenko to crown the company's new Middleweight Champion. The two men met at Bellator 88 on 7 February 2013 for the vacant title. Shlemenko won via knock out in the second round.

Shlemenko was expected to face Bellator Season Eight Middleweight Tournament winner Doug Marshall on 7 September 2013 at Bellator 98. However, on 19 August, Marshall was forced out of the title bout due to an injury and was replaced by Season 8 Middleweight Tournament runner up Brett Cooper. In the rematch Shlemenko defeated Cooper via unanimous decision to retain the Bellator Middleweight Championship.

The title fight with Doug Marshall eventually took place on 22 November 2013 at Bellator 109. Shlemenko won the fight via knockout in the first round with a body punch, successfully defending his title for the second time.

Shlemenko faced Bellator Season Nine Middleweight Tournament winner Brennan Ward at Bellator 114 on 28 March 2014. He won via guillotine choke submission in the second round to retain the Bellator Middleweight Championship.

In order to appear on the inaugural Bellator pay-per-view, Shlemenko moved up in weight to face Tito Ortiz in his Bellator MMA debut on 17 May 2014 at Bellator 120. He lost by submission via arm-triangle choke in the first round.

Shlemenko put up his Middleweight title against undefeated Brandon Halsey on 26 September 2014 at Bellator 126. He lost the fight and the title by submission at just thirty-five seconds into the first round.

=== Fight Nights Global (EFN) ===
After his loss to Tito Ortiz, Shlemenko was expected to face Yasubey Enomoto at Fight Nights: Battle of Moscow 16 on 11 July 2014. However, the bout was cancelled for unknown reasons. The fight eventually took place on 20 December 2014 at Fight Nights: Battle of Moscow 18. Shlemenko won by unanimous decision.

=== M-1 Global ===
Shlemenko faced former M-1 Global middleweight Champion Vyacheslav Vasilevsky on 19 February 2016 at M-1 Challenge 64. He won the fight via split decision.

Shlemenko returned to M-1 four months later to face Vyacheslav Vasilevsky in a rematch on 16 June 2016 at M-1 Challenge 64. Despite being battered by Vasilevsky in the first two rounds, Shlemenko rallied and won the fight via guillotine choke in the third round.

=== Return to Bellator ===
Shlemenko faced fellow knockout artist Melvin Manhoef in the main event at Bellator 133 on 13 February 2015. He won the bout by knockout due to a spinning back fist in the second round. On 17 March 2015, Shlemenko was suspended indefinitely for failing a post fight drug test with elevated testosterone levels. The result was changed to a No Contest. In June 2015, the California State Athletic Commission (CSAC) suspended Shlemenko for an unprecedented three years with a $10,000 fine. In September 2015, Shlemenko filed a writ against the CSAC to have his three-year suspension overturned. In July 2016, Shlemenko won his appeal and his suspension was lifted and his fine lowered 50%.

In his first fight in Bellator post-suspension, Shlemenko faced Kendall Grove in the main event at Bellator 162 on 21 October 2016. After a back-and-forth first round, Shlemenko won the bout in the second round due to a liver shot and right hook combination followed by strikes on the ground.

Shlemenko faced newly signed middleweight Gegard Mousasi at Bellator 185 on 20 October 2017. Shlemenko still lost the back-and-forth fight by controversial unanimous decision. Seven out of eleven MMA media outlets scored the fight as a decision win for Shlemenko.

Shlemenko competed in M-1 Global against Bruno Silva at M-1 Challenge 93 – Shlemenko vs. Silva on 1 June 2018. He lost the fight via first-round knockout.

Shlemenko faced Anatoly Tokov on 13 October 2018 at Bellator 208. He lost the fight via unanimous decision.

=== Free agent ===
After the stint in Bellator, Shlemenko faced Jonas Billstein at his native Russian Cagefighting Championship 5 on 15 December 2018. He won the fight via submission in the second round.

Next Shlemenko faced Viscardi Andrade at Russian Cagefighting Championship 6 on 4 May 2019. He won the fight via technical knockout in the third round.

Shlemenko faced Chris Honeycutt at Eastern Economic Forum: Roscongress Vladivostok Combat Night on 15 September 2019. He lost the fight via unanimous decision.

Shlemenko fought David Branch at Russian Cagefighting Championship 7 on 14 December 2019. He won via a guillotine choke submission in the first round.

Shlemenko faced Márcio Santos on 7 May 2021 at AMC Fight Nights 101. He won the bout via unanimous decision.

On 17 October 2021, Alexander Shlemenko met with Artur Guseinov in the main fight of the EFC 42 tournament. The fight lasted all three rounds and ended with Shlemenko's victory by unanimous decision.

On 3 March 2022, Shlemenko supported the 2022 Russian invasion of Ukraine.

Shlemenko faced Aleksandar Ilić on 26 August 2022 at RCC 12. He lost the bout via TKO stoppage 22 seconds into the bout, after getting caught by a knee and dropped.

Shlemenko faced Cleber Sousa on 30 September 2022 at Shlemenko FC 5. He fought to a split decision draw.

Shlemenko faced Magomed Ismailov on 3 December 2022 at RCC 13, losing the bout via unanimous decision.

Shlemenko faced Alex Oliveira on 21 July 2023 at Shlemenko FC 8, submitting him in the first round via guillotine choke.

Shlemenko rematched Aleksandar Ilić on 15 December 2023 at RCC 17, avenging his previous loss by TKO stoppage at the end of the first round.

Shlemenko faced Kazkah prospect Kuat Khamitov at RCC 19 on 11 May 2024. He won the fight via unanimous decision.

The following month Shlemenko fought UFC veteran Curtis Millender at Shlemenko FC 10 on 1 June 2024. He won the fight via technical knockout in the first round.

== Fighting style ==
Shlemenko is known for his unorthodox striking style, which is difficult to refer to as traditional Muay Thai, Kickboxing, or ARB. Alexander is known for his knee strikes, he also often uses techniques such as the spinning backkick or spinning backfist. As stated in many interviews, he prefers to fight stand-up rather than on the ground, always trying to knock his opponent out. Often esteemed as a pure striker, Shlemenko also has some grappling skills, which he showed by defeating via submission among others Gregory Babene and Zakir Lalashov (both via triangle choke). Alexander switches from southpaw to orthodox during his fights. In his blog he says, that he can fight equally in both positions.

Beside his technical skills, Alexander shows impressive cardio during his fights, which he attributes to skiing as a teenager.

== Championships and accomplishments ==
=== Mixed martial arts ===
- Bellator Fighting Championships
  - Bellator Middleweight World Championship (One time)
  - Three successful title defenses
  - Tied with Rafael Carvalho for the most successful Middleweight title defenses in Bellator history. (3)
  - Bellator Season 2 Middleweight Tournament Championship
  - Bellator Season 5 Middleweight Tournament Championship
- M-1 Global
  - M-1 Global Middleweight Grand Prix Champion
- World Kickboxing Network
  - World Kickboxing Network MMA European 75 kg Championship
- International Absolute Fighting Council
  - IAFC 2005 World Pankration Championship Tournament Championship
  - IAFC 2005 Championship of Asia Tournament Championship
  - IAFC 2004 Stage of Russia Tournament Championship
  - IAFC 2004 Stage of Russia Cup 5 Tournament Championship
  - IAFC 2004 Russian Pankration Championship Tournament Championship
  - IAFC 2004 Stage of Russia Cup 4 Tournament Championship
  - IAFC 2004 Pancration Asian Open Cup Tournament Runner-up
  - IAFC 2004 Stage of Russia Cup 3 Tournament Championship
- Cup of Empire
  - Cup of Empire 2004 Tournament Runner-up
- Sherdog
  - 2011 All-Violence Third Team
  - 2010 All-Violence Third Team

== Mixed martial arts record ==
Professional record breakdown
89 matches	69 wins	18 losses
By knockout	36	3
By submission	13	6
By decision	20	9
Draws	1	
No contests	1	

Res.	Record	Opponent	Method	Event	Date	Round	Time	Location	Notes
Win	69–17–1 (1)	Nikola Dipchikov	Submission (rear-naked choke)	ACA 204	June 19, 2026	2	2:39	Omsk, Russia	
Loss	68–17–1 (1)	Vladislav Kovalev	Technical Submission (rear-naked choke)	RCC 23	September 12, 2025	3	1:27	Chelyabinsk, Russia	For the vacant RCC Middleweight Championship.
Win	68–16–1 (1)	Guilherme Cadena	TKO (elbows and punches)	Shlemenko FC 11	July 12, 2025	1	3:29	Omsk, Russia	
Loss	67–16–1 (1)	Vladislav Kovalev	Decision (split)	RCC 22	May 31, 2025	3	5:00	Yekaterinburg, Russia	
Win	67–15–1 (1)	Anatoly Tokov	Decision (split)	RCC 21	December 14, 2024	3	5:00	Yekaterinburg, Russia	
Win	66–15–1 (1)	Curtis Millender	TKO (punches and elbows)	Shlemenko FC 10	1 June 2024	1	4:19	Omsk, Russia	
Win	65–15–1 (1)	Kuat Khamitov	Decision (unanimous)	RCC 19	11 May 2024	3	5:00	Yekaterinburg, Russia	
Win	64–15–1 (1)	Aleksandar Ilić	TKO (punches)	RCC 17	15 December 2023	1	4:50	Yekaterinburg, Russia	
Win	63–15–1 (1)	Alex Oliveira	Submission (guillotine choke)	Shlemenko FC 8	21 July 2023	1	1:59	Omsk, Russia	
Loss	62–15–1 (1)	Magomed Ismailov	Decision (unanimous)	RCC 13	3 December 2022	5	5:00	Yekaterinburg, Russia	
Draw	62–14–1 (1)	Cleber Sousa	Draw (split)	Shlemenko FC 5	30 September 2022	3	5:00	Omsk, Russia	
Loss	62–14 (1)	Aleksandar Ilić	TKO (knee and punches)	RCC 12	26 August 2022	1	0:22	Yekaterinburg, Russia	
Win	62–13 (1)	Artur Guseinov	Decision (unanimous)	Eagle FC 42	17 October 2021	3	5:00	Sochi, Russia	
Win	61–13 (1)	Márcio Santos	Decision (unanimous)	AMC Fight Nights 101	7 May 2021	3	5:00	Vladivostok, Russia	
Win	60–13 (1)	David Branch	Submission (guillotine choke)	RCC 7	14 December 2019	1	4:58	Yekaterinburg, Russia	
Loss	59–13 (1)	Chris Honeycutt	Decision (unanimous)	Eastern Economic Forum: Roscongress Vladivostok Combat Night	5 September 2019	5	5:00	Vladivostok, Russia	
Win	59–12 (1)	Viscardi Andrade	TKO (punches)	RCC 6	4 May 2019	3	3:37	Chelyabinsk, Russia	
Win	58–12 (1)	Jonas Billstein	Submission (guillotine choke)	RCC 5	15 December 2018	2	1:15	Yekaterinburg, Russia	
Loss	57–12 (1)	Anatoly Tokov	Decision (unanimous)	Bellator 208	13 October 2018	3	5:00	Uniondale, New York, United States	
Loss	57–11 (1)	Bruno Silva	KO (punches)	M-1 Challenge 93	1 June 2018	1	2:54	Chelyabinsk, Russia	
Loss	57–10 (1)	Gegard Mousasi	Decision (unanimous)	Bellator 185	20 October 2017	3	5:00	Uncasville, Connecticut, United States	
Win	57–9 (1)	Brandon Halsey	TKO (body kick and punches)	M-1 Challenge 79	1 June 2017	1	0:25	Saint Petersburg, Russia	
Win	56–9 (1)	Paul Bradley	Decision (unanimous)	M-1 Challenge 75	3 March 2017	3	5:00	Moscow, Russia	
Win	55–9 (1)	Kendall Grove	TKO (punches)	Bellator 162	21 October 2016	2	1:43	Memphis, Tennessee, United States	
Win	54–9 (1)	Vyacheslav Vasilevsky	Submission (guillotine choke)	M-1 Challenge 68	16 June 2016	3	2:09	Saint Petersburg, Russia	Won the 2016 M-1 Global Middleweight Grand Prix. Fight of the Night.
Win	53–9 (1)	Vyacheslav Vasilevsky	Decision (split)	M-1 Challenge 64	19 February 2016	3	5:00	Moscow, Russia	2016 M-1 Global Middleweight Grand Prix Semifinal. Fight of the Night.
NC	52–9 (1)	Melvin Manhoef	NC (overturned)	Bellator 133	13 February 2015	2	1:25	Fresno, California, United States	Originally a KO (spinning backfist) win for Shlemenko; overturned after he tested positive for Anabolic steroids.
Win	52–9	Yasubey Enomoto	Decision (unanimous)	Fight Nights: Battle of Moscow 18	20 December 2014	3	5:00	Moscow, Russia	
Loss	51–9	Brandon Halsey	Technical Submission (rear-naked choke)	Bellator 126	26 September 2014	1	0:35	Phoenix, Arizona, United States	Return to Middleweight. Lost the Bellator Middleweight World Championship.
Loss	51–8	Tito Ortiz	Technical Submission (arm-triangle choke)	Bellator 120	17 May 2014	1	2:27	Southaven, Mississippi, United States	Light Heavyweight debut.
Win	51–7	Brennan Ward	Submission (guillotine choke)	Bellator 114	28 March 2014	2	1:22	West Valley City, Utah, United States	Defended the Bellator Middleweight World Championship.
Win	50–7	Doug Marshall	KO (punch to the body)	Bellator 109	22 November 2013	1	4:28	Bethlehem, Pennsylvania, United States	Defended the Bellator Middleweight World Championship.
Win	49–7	Brett Cooper	Decision (unanimous)	Bellator 98	7 September 2013	5	5:00	Uncasville, Connecticut, United States	Defended the Bellator Middleweight World Championship.
Win	48–7	Maiquel Falcão	KO (punches)	Bellator 88	7 February 2013	2	2:18	Duluth, Georgia, United States	Won the vacant Bellator Middleweight World Championship.
Win	47–7	Anthony Ruiz	Decision (unanimous)	League S-70: Plotforma Cup 2012	11 August 2012	3	5:00	Sochi, Russia	
Win	46–7	Ikuhisa Minowa	TKO (knee and punch to the body)	Super Fight League 2	7 April 2012	1	2:20	Chandigarh, India	
Win	45–7	Julio Paulino	Decision (unanimous)	Modern Fighting Pankration: Battle of Empires 1	17 December 2011	3	5:00	Khabarovsk, Russia	
Win	44–7	Vitor Vianna	Decision (unanimous)	Bellator 57	12 November 2011	3	5:00	Rama, Ontario, Canada	Won the Bellator Season Five Middleweight Tournament.
Win	43–7	Brian Rogers	TKO (knees)	Bellator 54	15 October 2011	2	2:30	Atlantic City, New Jersey, United States	Bellator Season Five Middleweight Tournament Semifinal.
Win	42–7	Zelg Galešic	Submission (guillotine choke)	Bellator 50	17 September 2011	1	1:55	Hollywood, Florida, United States	Bellator Season Five Middleweight Tournament Quarterfinal.
Win	41–7	Antonio Santana	KO (punch)	League S-70: Russia vs. Brazil	6 August 2011	1	1:29	Sochi, Russia	
Win	40–7	Brett Cooper	Decision (unanimous)	Bellator 44	14 May 2011	3	5:00	Atlantic City, New Jersey, United States	
Win	39–7	Nick Wagner	KO (punch)	Fight Festival 30	12 March 2011	1	3:13	Helsinki, Finland	
Loss	38–7	Hector Lombard	Decision (unanimous)	Bellator 34	28 October 2010	5	5:00	Hollywood, Florida, United States	For the Bellator Middleweight World Championship.
Win	38–6	Bryan Baker	TKO (punches)	Bellator 23	24 June 2010	1	2:45	Louisville, Kentucky, United States	Won the Bellator Season Two Middleweight Tournament.
Win	37–6	Jared Hess	TKO (knee injury)	Bellator 20	27 May 2010	3	2:20	San Antonio, Texas, United States	Bellator Season Two Middleweight Tournament Semifinal.
Win	36–6	Matt Major	Decision (unanimous)	Bellator 16	29 April 2010	3	5:00	Kansas City, Missouri, United States	Bellator Season Two Middleweight Tournament Quarterfinal.
Win	35–6	Sean Salmon	KO (knee to the body)	Fight Festival 27	13 March 2010	1	0:40	Helsinki, Finland	
Win	34–6	Jean-François Lénogue	KO (spinning backfist)	Saturn & RusFighters: Battle of Gladiators 2010	13 February 2010	2	1:43	Omsk, Russia	
Win	33–6	Maksim Nevolia	Submission (rear-naked choke)	Union of Veterans: Cup of Champions 2009	27 November 2009	1	1:15	Novosibirsk, Russia	
Loss	32–6	Jordan Radev	KO (punch)	Fight Festival 26	17 October 2009	1	4:27	Helsinki, Finland	
Win	32–5	Patrik Kincl	Decision (unanimous)	Hell Cage 4	20 September 2009	3	5:00	Prague, Czech Republic	
Win	31–5	Petras Markevicius	Decision (unanimous)	Union of Veterans: Russia vs. The World	29 November 2008	3	5:00	Novosibirsk, Russia	
Win	30–5	Bubba McDaniel	TKO (flying knee to the body)	ShoXC: Elite Challenger Series 5	10 October 2008	1	5:00	Hammond, Indiana, United States	
Win	29–5	Gregory Babene	Submission (triangle choke)	Rus-Fighters: Siberian Challenge 2008	18 May 2008	1	4:48	Bratsk, Russia	
Win	28–5	Mikko Suvanto	KO (punches)	Fight Force 1	19 April 2008	1	N/A	Saint Petersburg, Russia	
Win	27–5	Diego Lionel Visotzky	KO (head kick)	BodogFight: USA vs. Russia 2007	30 November 2007	1	2:11	Moscow, Russia	
Win	26–5	Lalashov Zakir	Submission (triangle choke)	Rus-Fighters: Siberian Challenge 2007	14 October 2007	2	2:20	Bratsk, Russia	
Win	25–5	Scott Henze	KO (spinning backfist)	BodogFight: Vancouver	24 August 2007	1	0:57	Vancouver, British Columbia, Canada	
Win	24–5	Andre Balschmieter	TKO (punches)	Bratsk Combat Sports Festival 2007	24 February 2007	1	2:30	Bratsk, Russia	
Win	23–5	Mukhamed Aushev	TKO (punches)	Asian Pankration Federation: Battle of Borovoe 2006	1 October 2006	1	N/A	Borovoe, Kazakhstan	
Loss	22–5	Jose Landi-Jons	Decision (unanimous)	World Freefight Challenge 2	30 September 2006	3	5:00	Koper, Slovenia	
Loss	22–4	Ronaldo Souza	Technical Submission (arm-triangle choke)	Jungle Fight 6	29 April 2006	1	2:10	Manaus, Brazil	
Win	22–3	Shavkat Urakov	Submission (triangle choke)	Asian Pankration Federation: World Cup 2006	15 April 2006	N/A	N/A	Astana, Kazakhstan	
Win	21–3	Beslan Isaev	Submission (triangle choke)	Asian Pankration Federation: World Cup 2005	18 December 2005	3	N/A	Astana, Kazakhstan	Won the 2005 APF World Cup Middleweight Tournament.
Win	20–3	Murad Magomedov	TKO (corner stoppage)	Asian Pankration Federation: World Cup 2005	18 December 2005	N/A	N/A	Astana, Kazakhstan	2005 APF World Cup Middleweight Tournament Semifinal.
Win	19–3	Vasily Novikov	TKO (corner stoppage)	Asian Pankration Federation: World Cup 2005	18 December 2005	1	N/A	Astana, Kazakhstan	2005 APF World Cup Middleweight Tournament Quarterfinal.
Loss	18–3	Jose Landi-Jons	Decision (unanimous)	Jungle Fight 5	26 November 2005	3	5:00	Manaus, Brazil	
Win	18–2	Sergey Naumov	TKO (punches)	M-1: Russia vs. France	3 November 2005	2	4:50	Saint Petersburg, Russia	
Win	17–2	Sergey Gubin	KO (punch)	IAFC: Pankration Siberian Open Cup 2005	20 October 2005	N/A	N/A	Omsk, Russia	
Win	16–2	Ubaidula Chopolaev	Decision (unanimous)	M-1: New Blood	1 October 2005	2	5:00	Saint Petersburg, Russia	
Win	15–2	Vasily Krilov	Decision (unanimous)	IAFC: Asian Cup 2006	20 March 2005	3	5:00	Jakutsk, Russia	Won the 2006 IAFC: Asian Cup Middleweight Tournament.
Win	14–2	Musa Pliev	Decision (unanimous)	IAFC: Asian Cup 2006	20 March 2005	3	5:00	Jakutsk, Russia	2006 IAFC: Asian Cup Middleweight Tournament Semifinal.
Win	13–2	Sergei Akinen	KO (knee)	IAFC: Asian Cup 2006	20 March 2005	1	N/A	Jakutsk, Russia	2006 IAFC: Asian Cup Middleweight Tournament Quarterfinal.
Win	12–2	Vener Galiev	TKO (injury)	IAFC: Challenge Cup 6	20 December 2004	1	N/A	Ulianovsk, Russia	Won the IAFC: Challenge Cup 6 Tournament.
Win	11–2	Pavel Jaroslavtcev	TKO (punches)	IAFC: Challenge Cup 6	20 December 2004	1	N/A	Ulianovsk, Russia	IAFC: Challenge Cup 6 Tournament Semifinal.
Win	10–2	Murad Madomedov	TKO (punches)	IAFC: Challenge Cup 6	20 December 2004	3	N/A	Ulianovsk, Russia	IAFC: Challenge Cup 6 Tournament Quarterfinal.
Win	9–2	Jakov Burbolenko	TKO (punches)	IAFC: Challenge Cup 5	25 June 2004	2	N/A	Omsk, Russia	Won the IAFC: Challenge Cup 5 Tournament.
Win	8–2	Evgenij Zaviazochnikov	Submission (guillotine choke)	IAFC: Challenge Cup 5	25 June 2004	1	N/A	Omsk, Russia	IAFC: Challenge Cup 5 Tournament Semifinal.
Win	7–2	Vasiliy Blinov	TKO (punches)	IAFC: Challenge Cup 5	25 June 2004	2	N/A	Omsk, Russia	IAFC: Challenge Cup 5 Tournament Quarterfinal.
Win	6–2	Jeihun Aliev	TKO (punches)	IAFC: Challenge Cup 4	29 April 2004	2	N/A	Samara, Russia	Won the IAFC: Challenge Cup 4 Tournament.
Win	5–2	Magomed Sultanakhmedov	Decision (unanimous)	IAFC: Challenge Cup 4	29 April 2004	2	5:00	Samara, Russia	IAFC: Challenge Cup 4 Tournament Semifinal.
Loss	4–2	Vener Galiev	Decision (unanimous)	Cup of Empire 2004	18 March 2004	3	5:00	Kazan, Russia	2004 Cup of Empire Middleweight Tournament Final.
Win	4–1	Abdul Aziz Malaaiev	Decision (unanimous)	Cup of Empire 2004	18 March 2004	3	5:00	Kazan, Russia	2004 Cup of Empire Middleweight Tournament Semifinal.
Loss	3–1	Beslan Isaev	Submission (armbar)	IAFC: Pancration Asian Open Cup 2004	4 March 2004	1	N/A	Yakutsk, Russia	2004 IAFC Asian Cup Tournament Final.
Win	3–0	Anton Veisbekker	KO (punch)	IAFC: Pancration Asian Open Cup 2004	4 March 2004	N/A	N/A	Yakutsk, Russia	2004 IAFC Asian Cup Tournament Semifinal.
Win	2–0	Alexander Yakovlev	TKO (punches)	IAFC: Challenge Cup 3	19 February 2004	2	N/A	Omsk, Russia	Won the IAFC: Challenge Cup 3 Tournament.
Win	1–0	Zulfinar Sultanmagomedov	TKO (doctor stoppage)	IAFC: Challenge Cup 3	19 February 2004	1	N/A	Omsk, Russia	Middleweight debut. IAFC: Challenge Cup 3 Tournament Semifinal.

== Freestyle wrestling record ==
Freestyle matches
Res.	Record	Opponent	Score	Date	Event	Location
Loss	0–1	(United States) Brendan Allen	TF 0–10	October 23, 2026	RAF 14	(United States) Las Vegas, Nevada

== See also ==
- List of male mixed martial artists
