= Brett Cooper (fighter) =

American mixed martial arts fighter

- Born: July 2, 1987 (age 39); Los Angeles, California, U.S.
- Other names: Fudoshin
- Height: 6 ft 0 in (1.83 m)
- Weight: 185 lb (84 kg; 13.2 st)
- Division: Middleweight; Welterweight
- Reach: 70 in (178 cm)
- Fighting out of: Long Beach, California, U.S.
- Team: Bodyshop MMA
- Years active: 2005–present

Mixed martial arts record
- Total: 45
- Wins: 28
- By knockout: 18
- By submission: 2
- By decision: 7
- By disqualification: 1
- Losses: 17
- By knockout: 7
- By submission: 4
- By decision: 6

Other information
- Mixed martial arts record from Sherdog

Brett Cooper (born July 2, 1987) is an American mixed martial artist currently competing in the Welterweight division. A professional competitor since 2005, he has also competed for Bellator, PFL, Affliction, Absolute Championship Berkut, IFL, KSW, and Jungle Fight.

== Background ==
Cooper was born in Providence RI, and has lived in Long Beach, California his whole life.

== Mixed martial arts career ==
=== Early career ===
Cooper made his professional debut in 2005 when he was 17 years old and won via TKO. He held a record of 5–4 with a split decision win over future EliteXC and Strikeforce veteran Conor Heun before facing future UFC and Strikeforce veteran Jason Von Flue. Cooper won the bout via TKO and then made his IFL debut in his next fight against future UFC veteran Rory Markham. Cooper won again via TKO against the Miletich Fighting Systems product and followed this up with another win to bring his record to 8-4 and making his debut in Affliction.

=== Affliction ===
On January 24, 2009, Cooper fought Patrick Speight at Affliction: Day of Reckoning who he defeated by knockout.

=== Bellator Fighting Championships ===
==== Season Two Welterweight Tournament ====
Cooper fought Steve Carl as the main event at Bellator XV where is lost by split decision in the quarterfinals of the Bellator Season Two Welterweight Tournament.

==== Non-tournament bouts ====
In 2010, Cooper moved up to the Middleweight division. He fought Matt Major at Bellator XXIX where he won by second-round technical knockout.

In 2011, Cooper fought three times for Bellator in non-tournament bouts. He faced Alexander Shlemenko at Bellator XLIV where he lost by unanimous decision. Cooper fought Valdir Araujo at Bellator L where he won by third-round technical knockout. Finally, Cooper fought Jared Hess at Bellator LVIII where he won by unanimous decision.

In 2012, Cooper faced Darryl Cobb at Bellator LXXX where he won by unanimous decision.

==== Season Eight Middleweight Tournament ====
Cooper fought Norman Paraisy at Bellator LXXXIX in the quarterfinals of the Bellator Season Eight Middleweight Tournament. He won the fight via unanimous decision. Cooper faced Dan Cramer in the semifinals at Bellator 92. Despite losing the first two rounds, Cooper rallied to win via TKO in the third round. He faced Doug Marshall in the finals and lost via knockout in the first round.

Despite losing in the finals, Cooper was chosen as a replacement for Marshall when his former opponent injured his hand. Having earlier lost to Shlemenko in 2011, Cooper had the rematch with him for the Middleweight title on September 7, 2013, at Bellator 98. He lost the back-and-forth fight via unanimous decision.

==== Season Ten Middleweight Tournament ====
In March 2014, Cooper entered the Bellator Season 10 Middleweight tournament. He faced UFC veteran Kendall Grove in the semifinals at Bellator 114. After losing the first round, Cooper rallied back to win the bout via knockout in the second round. He faced Brandon Halsey in the tournament final at Bellator 122 and lost via submission.

==== Non-tournament bouts ====
Stepping in as a replacement for an injured James Irvin, Cooper was set to face Brian Rogers at Bellator 125 on September 19, 2014. However, a foot injury forced Cooper out of the bout, he was replaced with promotional newcomer Rafael Carvalho.

=== Absolute Championship Berkut ===
Cooper signed with ACB and faced Beslan Isaev at ACB 43: Battle on Sura on August 20, 2016. He won by unanimous decision.

Cooper beat second Chechen super star Aslanbek Saidov at ACB 50: Rasulov vs. Goltsov on December 18, 2016. He won the fight via TKO in the third round and became a new ACB welterweight Champion.

Cooper faced Mukhamed Berkhamov at ACB 67: Cooper vs. Berkhamov on August 19, 2017. He lost the fight via knockout in the second round and lost ACB welterweight title.

Cooper faced Sharaf Davlatmurodov at ACB 76: Cooper vs. Davlatmurodov on December 9, 2017. He won the fight via TKO in the second round.

Cooper was scheduled to face Beslan Isaev at ACA 116: Froes vs Balaev. However, after making weight, he consulted with his lawyers and decided to refuse fighting because of the U.S. Department of Treasury and Great Britain's sanctions policy against Kadyrov and any organization owned by him, this including Absolute Championship Akhmat. Under these sanctions, it is illegal for any US citizen to do business with any of these entities, meaning that all American fighters could face fines or jail time if they fight for the organization.

=== Professional Fighters League ===
Cooper was scheduled to face Nikolay Aleksakhin on August 13, 2021, at PFL 7. However, on August 4, it was announced that Aleksakhin had to pull out of the match-up and was replaced by Tyler Hill. Cooper won the bout in the first round via knockout.

==== PFL season 2022 ====
Cooper faced Rory MacDonald on May 6, 2022, at PFL 3. Cooper lost the bout in the first round via rear-naked choke.

Cooper faced Ray Cooper III on July 1, 2022, at PFL 6. He lost the bout via TKO stoppage 24 seconds into the bout.

== Personal life ==
Brett Cooper remains single and unmarried, with 2 brothers one who died.

== Championships and accomplishments ==
- Absolute Championship Berkut
  - Welterweight championship (one time)
- Bellator Fighting Championships
  - Bellator Season 8 Middleweight Tournament Runner-Up

== Mixed martial arts record ==
Professional record breakdown
45 matches	28 wins	17 losses
By knockout	18	7
By submission	2	4
By decision	7	6
By disqualification	1	0

Res.	Record	Opponent	Method	Event	Date	Round	Time	Location	Notes
Loss	28–17	Ray Cooper III	TKO (knees and punches)	PFL 6	July 1, 2022	1	0:24	Atlanta, Georgia, United States	
Loss	28–16	Rory MacDonald	Submission (rear-naked choke)	PFL 3	May 6, 2022	1	2:23	Arlington, Texas, United States	
Win	28–15	Tyler Hill	KO (punches)	PFL 7	August 13, 2021	1	2:32	Hollywood, Florida, United States	
Win	27–15	Alexey Efremov	DQ (illegal knee)	ACA 103: Yagshimuradov vs. Butorin	December 14, 2019	1	1:02	Saint Petersburg, Russia	
Loss	26–15	Sharaf Davlatmurodov	TKO (punches)	ACA 99: Bagov vs. Khaliev	September 27, 2019	2	0:24	Moscow, Russia	
Loss	26–14	Salamu Abdurakhmanov	Submission (anaconda choke)	ACA 95: Tumenov vs. Abdulaev	April 27, 2019	1	2:46	Moscow, Russia	For the inaugural ACA Middleweight Championship
Win	26–13	Azamat Amagov	Decision (majority)	ACA 91: Agujev vs. Silvério	January 26, 2019	3	5:00	Grozny, Russia	
Win	25–13	André Santos	KO (punches)	ACB 82: Silva vs. Kolobegov	March 9, 2018	1	1:42	São Paulo, Brazil	
Win	24–13	Sharaf Davlatmurodov	TKO (punches)	ACB 76: Young Eagles 23	December 9, 2017	2	3:29	Gold Coast, Australia	
Loss	23–13	Mukhamed Berkhamov	KO (punches)	ACB 67: Cooper vs. Berkhamov	August 19, 2017	2	0:32	Grozny, Russia	Lost ACB Welterweight Championship.
Win	23–12	Aslambek Saidov	TKO (punches)	ACB 50: Stormbringer	December 18, 2016	3	0:27	St.Petersburg, Russia	Won vacant ACB Welterweight Championship.
Win	22–12	Beslan Isaev	Decision (unanimous)	ACB 43: Battle of the Sura	August 20, 2016	3	5:00	Penza, Russia	Return to Welterweight.
Loss	21–12	Maiquel Falcao	KO (punch)	KSW 32: Road to Wembley	October 31, 2015	1	0:59	London, England	
Win	21–11	Jessie Glass	TKO (punches)	Gladiator Challenge: California State Championship Series	June 20, 2015	1	2:11	San Jacinto, California, United States	
Loss	20–11	Mamed Khalidov	Decision (unanimous)	KSW 29: Reload	December 6, 2014	3	5:00	Kraków, Poland	
Loss	20–10	Brandon Halsey	Submission (armbar)	Bellator 122	July 25, 2014	1	2:09	Temecula, California, United States	Bellator Season Ten Middleweight Tournament Final.
Win	20–9	Kendall Grove	KO (punches)	Bellator 114	March 28, 2014	2	3:33	West Valley City, Utah, United States	Bellator Season Ten Middleweight Tournament Semifinal.
Loss	19–9	Alexander Shlemenko	Decision (unanimous)	Bellator 98	September 7, 2013	5	5:00	Uncasville, Connecticut, United States	For the Bellator Middleweight Championship.
Loss	19–8	Doug Marshall	KO (punches)	Bellator 95	April 4, 2013	1	3:39	Atlantic City, New Jersey, United States	Bellator Season Eight Middleweight Tournament Final.
Win	19–7	Dan Cramer	TKO (punches)	Bellator 92	March 7, 2013	3	3:19	Temecula, California, United States	Bellator Season Eight Middleweight Tournament Semifinal.
Win	18–7	Norman Paraisy	Decision (unanimous)	Bellator 89	February 14, 2013	3	5:00	Charlotte, North Carolina, United States	Bellator Season Eight Middleweight Tournament Quarterfinal.
Win	17–7	Darryl Cobb	Decision (unanimous)	Bellator 80	November 9, 2012	3	5:00	Hollywood, Florida, United States	
Win	16–7	Jared Hess	Decision (unanimous)	Bellator 58	November 19, 2011	3	5:00	Hollywood, Florida, United States	
Win	15–7	Joe Doerksen	TKO (punches)	Score Fighting Series 2	October 14, 2011	1	3:55	Hamilton, Ontario, Canada	
Win	14–7	Valdir Araujo	TKO (punches)	Bellator 50	September 17, 2011	3	0:35	Hollywood, Florida, United States	
Loss	13–7	Alexander Shlemenko	Decision (unanimous)	Bellator 44	May 14, 2011	3	5:00	Atlantic City, New Jersey, United States	
Win	13–6	Keith Berry	KO (punches)	Lords of the Cage	November 19, 2010	1	0:10	Temecula, California, United States	
Win	12–6	Matt Major	TKO (punches)	Bellator 29	September 16, 2010	2	1:27	Milwaukee, Wisconsin, United States	Middleweight debut.
Loss	11–6	Steve Carl	Decision (split)	Bellator 15	April 22, 2010	3	5:00	Uncasville, Connecticut, United States	Bellator Season Two Welterweight Tournament Quarterfinal.
Win	11–5	Sérgio Moraes	KO (punch)	Jungle Fight 16	October 17, 2009	2	5:00	Rio de Janeiro, Brazil	
Loss	10–5	Waachiim Spiritwolf	TKO (punches)	Fight Force International: Ultimate Chaos	June 27, 2009	1	3:41	Biloxi, Mississippi, United States	
Win	10–4	Joe Cronin	TKO (doctor stoppage)	Call To Arms 1	May 16, 2009	1	1:17	Ontario, California, United States	
Win	9–4	Patrick Speight	TKO (punches)	Affliction: Day of Reckoning	January 24, 2009	2	4:10	Anaheim, California, United States	
Win	8–4	Dusty Arden	KO (punches)	PureCombat 4: Bombs Away	June 6, 2008	2	0:39	Visalia, California, United States	
Win	7–4	Rory Markham	TKO (punches)	IFL: World Grand Prix Finals	December 29, 2007	2	1:15	Uncasville, Connecticut, United States	
Win	6–4	Jason Von Flue	TKO (punches)	PureCombat 1: From the Ashes	December 1, 2007	1	N/A	Visalia, California, United States	
Win	5–4	Vince Guzman	Submission (anaconda choke)	Shooto: The Arrival: This is Shooto	August 18, 2007	1	1:58	Irvine, California, United States	
Loss	4–4	Toby Grear	Decision	Total Fighting Alliance 6: War on the Shore	April 28, 2007	3	5:00	Santa Monica, California, United States	
Win	4–3	Jesse Romero	Submission (guillotine choke)	Total Fighting Alliance 5: Conflict on the Coast	February 24, 2007	2	2:09	Santa Monica, California, United States	
Win	3–3	Conor Heun	Decision (split)	Total Fighting Alliance 4: Fight Night, Fright Night	November 3, 2006	3	5:00	Carson, California, United States	
Loss	2–3	Jesse Romero	Submission (rear-naked choke)	Universal Above Ground Fighting: Kaos on the Kampus	May 20, 2006	2	3:52	Los Angeles, California, United States	
Loss	2–2	Bryan Joplin	Decision (unanimous)	California Xtreme Fighting 1	April 29, 2006	3	5:00	Upland, California, United States	
Loss	2–1	Ed Ratcliff	KO (spinning heel kick)	Total Combat 12	December 17, 2005	2	N/A	Tijuana, Baja California, Mexico	
Win	2–0	Jesse Romero	Decision (unanimous)	World FC: Rumble at the Ramada	December 8, 2005	3	N/A	Norwalk, California, United States	
Win	1–0	Cody Culkin	TKO (punches)	Total Combat 10	October 25, 2005	1	1:38	San Diego, California, United States	
