= Vitor Vianna =

Brazilian mixed martial arts fighter

Vítor Vianna
- Born: November 2, 1979 (age 46); Espírito Santo, Brazil
- Height: 5 ft 11 in (1.80 m)
- Weight: 185 lb (84 kg; 13.2 st)
- Division: Middleweight
- Stance: Southpaw
- Fighting out of: Las Vegas, Nevada, United States
- Team: Wand Fight Team
- Rank: 2nd degree black belt in Brazilian jiu-jitsu
- Years active: 2004-present

Mixed martial arts record
- Total: 16
- Wins: 12
- By knockout: 5
- By submission: 4
- By decision: 3
- Losses: 3
- By knockout: 2
- By decision: 1
- Draws: 1

Other information
- Mixed martial arts record from Sherdog
- Last updated on: May 5, 2011

Vítor Vianna (born November 2, 1979) is a Brazilian mixed martial artist and submission grappler.

== Background ==
Vítor Vianna grew up in Espírito Santo, Brazil. He began his martial arts training in Brazilian jiu-jitsu at the age of 15 at the Alliance BJJ Academy in São Paulo, Brazil under Fabio Gurgel. He was also trained by Daniel Gracie for one year in Rio de Janeiro. He is a 2nd degree black belt under Rodrigo Medeiros, and Eduardo Jamelao. After becoming two-time world champion, Vitor decided to transition to MMA in 2004. After 12 professional fights, his first loss was a TKO (referee stoppage) for a broken arm he sustained while blocking a kick by UFC fighter Thiago Silva.

== Mixed martial arts career ==
Since 2004, Vitor Vianna has competed in mixed martial arts events around the world. Vitor is a member of Wanderlei Silva's the Wand Fight Team.

=== Bellator Fighting Championships ===
Vianna made his Bellator debut as a participant in the Bellator Season 5 Middleweight Tournament. In the opening round, he defeated Sam Alvey via split decision at Bellator 50. In the semifinal round, Vianna defeated Bryan Baker via TKO in the first round at Bellator 54. He faced Alexander Shlemenko in the tournament finals and lost the fight via unanimous decision.

== Personal life ==
Vitor Vianna is married with one daughter. He lives and trains in Las Vegas, Nevada. When he is not training, Vitor enjoys spending time with friends and family.

== Mixed martial arts record ==
Professional record breakdown
16 matches	12 wins	3 losses
By knockout	5	2
By submission	4	0
By decision	3	1
Draws	1	

Res.	Record	Opponent	Method	Event	Date	Round	Time	Location	Notes
Loss	12–3–1	Brian Rogers	KO (flying knee)	Bellator 61	March 16, 2012	1	4:14	Bossier City, Louisiana, United States	Bellator Season 6 Middleweight Tournament Quarterfinal
Loss	12–2–1	Alexander Shlemenko	Decision (unanimous)	Bellator 57	November 12, 2011	3	5:00	Rama, Ontario, Canada	Bellator Season 5 Middleweight Tournament Final
Win	12–1–1	Bryan Baker	TKO (punches)	Bellator 54	October 15, 2011	1	0:54	Atlantic City, New Jersey, United States	Bellator Season 5 Middleweight Tournament Semifinal
Win	11–1–1	Sam Alvey	Decision (split)	Bellator 50	September 17, 2011	3	5:00	Hollywood, Florida, United States	Bellator Season 5 Middleweight Tournament Quarterfinal
Win	10–1–1	Aaron Brink	TKO (punches)	Millennium Events: MMA Xplosion	October 9, 2010	1	1:17	Las Vegas, Nevada, United States	
Win	9–1–1	B.J. Lacy	Submission (rear-naked choke)	MMA Xplosion: Vianna vs. Lacy	August 31, 2010	1	2:02	Las Vegas, Nevada, United States	
Win	8–1–1	Gatta Tjaad	TKO (punches)	Beast of the East	May 31, 2008	1	N/A	Zutphen, Netherlands	
Loss	7–1–1	Thiago Silva	TKO (arm injury)	Fury FC 2: Final Combat	November 30, 2006	1	1:50	São Paulo, Brazil	
Win	7–0–1	Danilo Pereira	Decision (unanimous)	Fury FC 2: Final Combat	November 30, 2006	3	5:00	São Paulo, Brazil	
Win	6–0–1	Francis Carmont	Decision (unanimous)	Kam Lung: Only the Strongest Survive 5	October 8, 2006	2	5:00	Zutphen, Netherlands	
Win	5–0–1	Joao Assis	TKO (punches)	Fury FC 1: Warlords Unleashed	September 27, 2006	1	1:57	São Paulo, Brazil	
Win	4–0–1	Michael Knaap	Submission (flying armbar)	Beast of the East	May 12, 2006	3	N/A	Zutphen, Netherlands	
Draw	3–0–1	Moise Rimbon	Draw	Future Battle	March 5, 2006	3	5:00	Netherlands	
Win	3–0	António Conceição	KO (spinning wheel kick)	Hurricane	September 24, 2005	3	N/A	Curitiba, Brazil	
Win	2–0	Murilo Assuncao	Submission (rear-naked choke)	Storm Samurai 7	June 11, 2005	2	4:33	Curitiba, Brazil	
Win	1–0	Genivaldo Barbosa	Submission (rear naked choke)	Shooto Brazil: Never Shake	October 23, 2004	1	N/A	São Paulo, Brazil	

== Submission grappling record (incomplete) ==
? Matches, ? Wins, ? Losses
Result	Rec.	Opponent	Method	Event	Division	Date	Location
Loss	1–1	(Norway) John-Olav Einemo	Points	ADCC World Championship	-99 kg	2005	(United States) Los Angeles
Win	1–0	(United States) Mike van Arsdale	-	ADCC World Championship	-99 kg	2005	(United States) Los Angeles
