= Maiquel Falcão =

Brazilian mixed martial arts fighter (1981–2022)

- Born: Maiquel José Falcão Gonçalves; 8 March 1981; Pelotas, Rio Grande Do Sul, Brazil
- Died: 23 January 2022 (aged 40); Pelotas, Rio Grande Do Sul, Brazil
- Other names: Big Rig
- Height: 5 ft 9 in (1.75 m)
- Weight: 205 lb (93 kg; 14.6 st)
- Division: Heavyweight; Light Heavyweight; Middleweight
- Reach: 71.0 in (180 cm)
- Stance: Orthodox
- Fighting out of: Curitiba, Brazil
- Team: Renovação Fight Team (formerly); Chute Boxe Academy; Rasthai Temple
- Rank: Black belt in Brazilian Jiu-Jitsu
- Years active: 2004–2022

Mixed martial arts record
- Total: 61
- Wins: 40
- By knockout: 28
- By submission: 5
- By decision: 7
- Losses: 20
- By knockout: 14
- By submission: 4
- By decision: 2
- No contests: 1

Other information
- Mixed martial arts record from Sherdog
- Last updated on: 22 November 2010

Maiquel José Falcão Gonçalves (8 March 1981 – 23 January 2022) was a Brazilian professional mixed martial artist who competed in the Light Heavyweight division. A professional competitor since 2004, Falcão was perhaps best known for his stint in Bellator, winning the Season Six Middleweight Tournament; he also fought for the UFC, KSW, Fight Nights Global, and M-1 Global.

== Mixed martial arts career ==
=== Early career ===
Falcão compiled a record of 25-3 (1) with 21 wins by knockout, fighting exclusively in his native Brazil. Two of his early losses came at the hands of former UFC Light Heavyweight Fábio Maldonado.

=== Ultimate Fighting Championship ===
On 20 November 2010, Falcão made his UFC debut at UFC 123, beating Gerald Harris by a controversial unanimous decision. The bout was controversial for multiple reasons. First, after dominating the opening round, Falcão sank in a rear-naked choke. However, the round buzzer went off at least five seconds early. This was arguably costly for Falcão, as Dana White speculated that had the round expired at the correct time, Harris would have succumbed to the submission. Falcão's initial momentum waned, with the third round seeing a virtual stop to his attacks. After a strong crowd reaction, the bout ended with Falcão winning via unanimous decision (29-27, 29–28, 29–28).

Following the fight (and criticism from Dana White), Falcão stated that the lack of action in the third round was because he was waiting for Harris to attack, however he later conceded that White's criticism was fair. The bout's heavy criticism cost Harris his job shortly afterwards. Falcão remarked on his opponent's behavior during the fight, stating "[h]e tapped out in three different occasions, hiding it. It was a new thing for me, it was the first time I got three wins on the same bout. On the first round, he tapped out the first time when he was on the four points position, then he tapped out again in the end of the first round, when I got him on the rear-naked choke with his body turned up, and on the third round he tapped out again on a rear-naked choke."

Just days later, Falcão was arrested in Brazil for assaulting a woman outside a nightclub back in 2002. In 2002 Falcão had been sentenced to 24 months in prison, but following 8 months of the sentence he moved to house arrest on the assurance from his lawyer.

Falcão was expected to return at UFC Live: Sanchez vs. Kampmann against Alessio Sakara. However, in January 2011, he pulled out of the fight due to injury.

Falcão was expected to face Tom Lawlor on 27 August 2011, at UFC 134. However, the UFC abruptly released him on 11 May. According to one of Falcão's agents, the move came after fans and media bombarded the UFC with demands that he be removed from the UFC 134 card. In 2013, UFC president Dana White confirmed that he'd cut Falcão two years earlier because the UFC has zero tolerance for assault on women. He said, "Sexual assault, hitting a woman or anything like that, you're gone from the roster. It doesn't matter if you're a winner or a champion or anything like that. You're gone. Keep your hands off women."

=== Post-UFC ===
Falcão's first fight after his release was against fellow Brazilian Julio Cesar Bilik at Centurion MMA 2 on 9 July 2011. Falcão dropped Bilik early on with a clean punch then pouncing on him with a barrage of punches before the referee eventually stepped in to stop the fight giving Falcão the TKO win after just 27 seconds. Falcão faced Dibir Zagirov at Oplot Challenge 100 on 15 February 2014. He won via guillotine choke.

=== Bellator ===
In early 2012, Falcão joined the Bellator Season Six Middleweight Tournament. He faced Norman Paraisy in the opening round at Bellator 61 and dominated the fight by using his superior striking and scoring multiple takedowns, Falcão won via unanimous decision. In the semifinals round, Maiquel faced Vyacheslav Vasilevsky on 20 April at Bellator 66. He won the fight via unanimous decision. Falcão then faced Andreas Spang in the finals at Bellator 69. After his win over Vasilevsky, Falcão was involved in a post-fight scuffle with Spang, who was brought into the cage to do a face-off with Falcão for the first time after Spang's fight. When they moved in close to each other, Spang immediately shoved Falcão. Startled by this, the much publicized temperament of Falcão rushed back at him with a knee to the ribcage and then lifted up his hand as if looking to throw a punch. Officials, Bellator commentator/former fighter Jimmy Smith and fight matchmaker Sam Caplan separated the two from one another. After getting rocked in the first round, Falcão opted for a more conservative approach by using his wrestling to grind out Spang and he won via unanimous decision.

On 25 April 2012, Bellator CEO Bjorn Rebney announced that Falcão, the winner of the Season Six Middleweight Tournament, would face Alexander Shlemenko to crown the company's new Middleweight Champion. The two men met at Bellator 88 on 7 February 2013, for the vacant title. After a back and forth fight, Shlemenko won via knockout in the second round.

On 25 July 2013, Bellator released Falcão due to ongoing legal battles in his home country of Brazil. The last straw was a violent brawl outside a gas station (see below).

=== Post-Bellator ===
After a year away from the sport, Falcão returned and faced Dibir Zagirov at Oplot Challenge 100 on 15 February 2014. Falcão won via submission in the second round.

Falcão then faced top Polish prospect Mamed Khalidov at KSW 27 on 17 May 2014. Falcão lost the bout via armbar submission in the later stages of round 1.

In a rematch from their Bellator 66 bout, Falcão faced Vyacheslav Vasilevsky at Plotforma S-70 5 on 9 August 2014. Falcão would lose via TKO at 0:37 in the first round.

After two consecutive losses, Falcão rebounded in a three-fight win streak, with notable wins over Brett Cooper (Bellator veteran), Jesse Taylor (WSOF veteran) and Artur Guseinov (M-1 Global veteran).

Falcão faced M-1 Global Middleweight Champion Ramazan Emeev on 4 April 2016, at M-1 Grand Prix 2016. He lost the fight via submission.

=== Fight Nights Global ===
In 2016 Falcão signed with Fight Nights Global.

Falcão defeated Vladimir Mineev on 9 December 2016, at Fight Nights Global 56.

Falcao dropped a rematch with Mineev on 21 April 2017, at Fight Nights Global 63 via first-round TKO.

Falcao faced Ayub Gimbatov on 4 November 2017 at Fight Nights Global 78. He lost the fight via TKO in the first round.

Falcao was scheduled to face fellow Bellator veteran Emiliano Sordi on 18 November 2017 for the Arena Tour Light Heavyweight Championship, but the bout was cancelled.

== Gas station altercation ==
In July 2013, Falcão and a fellow MMA fighter Kauê Mena became involved in a struggle inside a gas station's convenience store in Balneário Camboriú after Falcão assaulted a female customer. Moments after striking the alleged assault victim, a relative of the victim came into the store and attempted to punch Falcão, missing, and Falcão knocked him to the ground.

As Falcão attempted to flee the scene, he and Mena were confronted outside the gas station and surrounded by three or four male relatives and friends of the assault victim. As one of the men punched Mena another hit Falcão with a piece of wood from the front, knocking him out. Falcão was then kicked backwards while receiving more strikes with the makeshift weapon. During this time Mena was punched and kicked while he was on the ground unconscious.

Mena was in serious condition at an intensive care unit and Falcão had only minor injuries.

A few days after the struggle, Renovação Fight Team coach Marcelo Brigadeiro expelled Falcão and Mena from the team. The fight also led to his release from Bellator.

In an interview after the incident, Falcão claimed that the two fighters had come to the gas station from a bar to purchase more alcohol. While inside, Falcão admits to making sexual advances towards the young girl. He then admitted to striking the young girl because, he claims, she made racial slurs directed at him.

Falcão later apologized to Mena's family as well as the MMA community.

Kauê Mena has all but retired from mixed martial arts as he is unable to even go outside without help.

== Personal life and death ==
Falcão married a Ukrainian woman named Nataliia Tandarina in Kyiv on January 10, 2020. In the early hours of 23 January 2022, Falcão was stabbed outside of a bar in his hometown of Pelotas, Brazil. He was rushed to a nearby hospital where he was pronounced dead, at the age of 40.

== Accomplishments and championships ==
- Bellator Fighting Championships
  - Bellator Season Six Middleweight Tournament Winner
- Serbian Battle Championship
  - SBC Light Heavyweight Championship (one time)

== Mixed martial arts record ==
Professional record breakdown
| 61 matches | 40 wins | 20 losses |
| By knockout | 28 | 14 |
| By submission | 5 | 4 |
| By decision | 7 | 2 |
| No contests | 1 | |

| Res. | Record | Opponent | Method | Event | Date | Round | Time | Location | Notes |
|---|---|---|---|---|---|---|---|---|---|
| Loss | 40–20 (1) | Nemanja Uveric | TKO (punches) | Serbian Battle Championship 36 | 16 October 2021 | 1 | 2:30 | Zrenjanin, Serbia | Catchweight (198 lbs) bout. |
| Loss | 40–19 (1) | Sergey Romanov | Submission (anaconda choke) | Krepost Fighting Championship | 14 December 2019 | 1 | 3:10 | Sochi, Russia | Middleweight bout. |
| Loss | 40–18 (1) | Igor Pokrajac | TKO (elbows and punches) | Serbian Battle Championship 25 | 7 December 2019 | 1 | 3:24 | Novi Sad, Serbia | Lost the SBC Light Heavyweight Championship. |
| Loss | 40–17 (1) | Evgeny Erokin | TKO (punches) | MFP: Parus Fight Championship | 3 November 2019 | 1 | 1:06 | Dubai, India | |
| Loss | 40–16 (1) | Muzaffar Radjabov | TKO (punches) | WTFKF: World Total Kombat Federation | 8 September 2019 | 2 | 0:33 | Bukhara, Uzbekistan | For the WTKF Light Heavyweight Championship. |
| Win | 40–15 (1) | Igor Pokrajac | TKO (punches) | Serbian Battle Championship 21 | 4 May 2019 | 1 | 4:55 | Odžaci, Serbia | Won the vacant SBC Light Heavyweight Championship. |
| Loss | 39–15 (1) | Wagner Silva Gomes | Decision (split) | SFT: Standard Fighting Tournament 9 | 19 January 2019 | 3 | 5:00 | São Paulo, Brazil | Catchweight (194 lbs) bout. |
| Loss | 39–14 (1) | Marcus Vinicius Fialho de Silveira | KO (punches) | Jorge Velho Team: JVT Championship 14 | 8 December 2018 | 2 | 1:46 | Caxias do Sul, Brazil | For the vacant JVT Light Heavyweight Championship. |
| Loss | 39–13 (1) | Attila Végh | Decision (unanimous) | Oktagon 10 | 17 November 2018 | 3 | 5:00 | Prague, Czech Republic | |
| Win | 39–12 (1) | Patrick Quadros | Decision (unanimous) | TAURA MMA: 5 | 9 September 2018 | 2 | 2:55 | Viamão, Brazil | Return to Light Heavyweight. |
| Loss | 38–12 (1) | Ayub Gimbatov | TKO (punches) | Fight Nights Global 78: Tsarev vs. Guseinov | 4 November 2017 | 1 | 4:12 | Samara, Russia | Middleweight bout. |
| Loss | 38–11 (1) | Strahinja Gavrilovic | TKO (doctor stoppage) | TKO 40 | 8 September 2017 | 2 | 5:00 | Montreal, Quebec, Canada | Catchweight (205 lbs) bout. |
| Win | 38–10 (1) | Jose Rodrigo Guelke | Decision (unanimous) | Aspera Fighting Championship 55 | 12 August 2017 | 3 | 5:00 | Paraná, Brazil | Heavyweight bout. |
| Loss | 37–10 (1) | Vladimir Mineev | TKO (punches) | Fight Nights Global 63: Alibekov vs. Khamitov | 21 April 2017 | 1 | 3:36 | Vladivostok, Russia | Catchweight (194 lbs) bout. |
| Win | 37–9 (1) | Vladimir Mineev | Decision (majority) | Fight Nights Global 56: Falcão vs. Mineev | 9 December 2016 | 3 | 5:00 | Vladivostok, Russia | |
| Win | 36–9 (1) | Tyago Moreira | Submission (guillotine choke) | Aspera Fighting Championship 43 | 13 August 2016 | 1 | 4:08 | Paraná, Brazil | |
| Loss | 35–9 (1) | Ramazan Emeev | Submission (anaconda choke) | M-1 Challenge 65: Emeev vs. Falcão | 8 April 2016 | 1 | 2:50 | St. Petersburg, Russia | For the M-1 Global Middleweight Championship. |
| Loss | 35–8 (1) | Aziz Karaoglu | TKO (punches) | KSW 33: Khalidov vs. Materla | 28 November 2015 | 1 | 0:30 | Kraków, Poland | |
| Win | 35–7 (1) | Brett Cooper | KO (punch) | KSW 32: Road to Wembley | 31 October 2015 | 1 | 0:59 | London, England | |
| Win | 34–7 (1) | Jesse Taylor | Submission (guillotine choke) | Arena Tour 5: Falcao vs. Taylor | 18 April 2015 | 1 | 3:13 | Buenos Aires, Argentina | |
| Win | 33–7 (1) | Artur Guseinov | Submission (rear-naked choke) | Battle of Stars 3 | 6 December 2014 | 2 | 1:49 | Kaspiysk, Russia | |
| Loss | 32–7 (1) | Vyacheslav Vasilevsky | TKO (punches) | Plotforma S-70: 5 | 9 August 2014 | 1 | 0:37 | Sochi, Russia | |
| Loss | 32–6 (1) | Mamed Khalidov | Submission (armbar) | KSW 27: Cage Time | 17 May 2014 | 1 | 4:52 | Gdańsk, Poland | |
| Win | 32–5 (1) | Dibir Zagirov | Submission (guillotine choke) | Oplot Challenge 100 | 15 February 2014 | 2 | 3:27 | Kharkiv, Ukraine | |
| Loss | 31–5 (1) | Alexander Shlemenko | KO (punches) | Bellator 88 | 7 February 2013 | 2 | 2:18 | Duluth, United States | For the Bellator Middleweight Championship. |
| Win | 31–4 (1) | Andreas Spang | Decision (unanimous) | Bellator 69 | 18 May 2012 | 3 | 5:00 | Lake Charles, United States | Bellator Season Six Middleweight Tournament Final. |
| Win | 30–4 (1) | Vyacheslav Vasilevsky | Decision (unanimous) | Bellator 66 | 20 April 2012 | 3 | 5:00 | Cleveland, United States | Bellator Season Six Middleweight Tournament Semifinal. |
| Win | 29–4 (1) | Norman Paraisy | Decision (unanimous) | Bellator 61 | 16 March 2012 | 3 | 5:00 | Bossier City, United States | Bellator Season Six Middleweight Tournament Quarterfinal. |
| Win | 28–4 (1) | Douglas del Rio | TKO (punches) | Apocalypse FC 1 | 8 October 2011 | 1 | 1:15 | Passo Fundo, Brazil | |
| Loss | 27–4 (1) | Antônio Braga Neto | Submission (kimura) | Amazon Forest Combat 1 | 14 September 2011 | 2 | 4:26 | Manaus, Brazil | |
| Win | 27–3 (1) | Julio Cesar Bilik | TKO (punches) | Centurion MMA 2 | 9 July 2011 | 1 | 0:28 | Itajaí, Brazil | |
| Win | 26–3 (1) | Gerald Harris | Decision (unanimous) | UFC 123 | 20 November 2010 | 3 | 5:00 | Auburn Hills, United States | |
| Win | 25–3 (1) | Wendres Carlos da Silva | TKO (punches) | Arena Gold Fights 2 | 17 July 2010 | 1 | N/A | Curitiba, Brazil | |
| Win | 24–3 (1) | Daniel Ludtke | TKO (knee and punches) | Match Point Sports Aquafit Fight Championship 2 | 9 October 2009 | 1 | 0:52 | Pelotas, Brazil | |
| Win | 23–3 (1) | Ricardo Silva | TKO (doctor stoppage) | Blackout FC 3 | 5 September 2009 | 1 | 0:12 | Balneário Camboriú, Brazil | |
| Win | 22–3 (1) | Arimarcel Santos | TKO (punches) | WFC: Pozil Challenge | 1 August 2009 | 1 | 2:26 | Gramado, Brazil | |
| Win | 21–3 (1) | Eli Reger | Submission (rear-naked choke) | Nitrix Show Fight 2 | 16 May 2009 | 1 | 2:29 | Joinville, Brazil | |
| Win | 20–3 (1) | Allan Froes | TKO (punches) | Golden Fighters 1 | 18 April 2009 | 1 | 2:15 | Novo Hamburgo, Brazil | |
| Win | 19–3 (1) | Nelson Martins | KO (punches) | Floripa Fight 5 | 7 March 2009 | 1 | N/A | Florianópolis, Brazil | |
| Loss | 18–3 (1) | Daniel Ludtke | TKO (punches) | Clube da Luta 1 | 21 December 2008 | 1 | 1:12 | Novo Hamburgo, Brazil | |
| Win | 18–2 (1) | Romulo Nascimento | KO (punches) | Paranagua Fight 2 | 5 September 2008 | 1 | 2:10 | Paranaguá, Brazil | |
| Win | 17–2 (1) | Rodrigo Freitas | TKO (punches) | Predador FC 11 | 6 July 2008 | 2 | 2:24 | Brazil | |
| Win | 16–2 (1) | Edson Franca | Submission (punches) | Predador FC 10: Kamae | 26 April 2008 | 2 | N/A | São Paulo, Brazil | |
| Win | 15–2 (1) | Josue Verde | TKO (punches) | Floripa Fight 4 | 29 March 2008 | 1 | 1:40 | Florianópolis, Brazil | |
| Loss | 14–2 (1) | Fábio Maldonado | TKO (punches) | Predador FC 9: Welterweight Grand Prix | 15 March 2008 | 2 | 2:00 | São Paulo, Brazil | |
| NC | 14–1 (1) | Fabiano Scherner | No Contest | Desafio: Fight Show | 8 December 2007 | 1 | N/A | Brazil | |
| Win | 14–1 | Reinaldo Samurai | KO (punch) | Bage Open Fight | 10 November 2007 | 1 | 3:00 | Bage, Brazil | |
| Win | 13–1 | Daniel Barbosa | KO (knee and punches) | Desafio: Fight Show | 8 September 2007 | 1 | 1:40 | Pelotas, Brazil | |
| Win | 12–1 | Alex Moura | TKO (punches) | Full Fight: Open Vale Tudo | 11 August 2007 | 1 | 2:00 | Brazil | |
| Win | 11–1 | Lucio Aguiar | KO (punches) | Storm Samurai | 28 July 2007 | 1 | N/A | Pelotas, Brazil | |
| Win | 10–1 | Leandro Gordo | KO (punches) | Desafio: Fight Show | 23 June 2007 | 1 | 0:15 | Florianópolis, Brazil | |
| Win | 9–1 | Laerte Costa Silva de Oliveira | TKO (submission to punches) | G1: Open Fight 3 | 19 May 2007 | 1 | 4:30 | Curitiba, Brazil | |
| Loss | 8–1 | Fábio Maldonado | TKO (punches) | Mariliense MMA Circuit 1 | 18 May 2007 | 3 | 0:46 | São Paulo, Brazil | |
| Win | 8–0 | Felipe Miranda | KO (punches and elbows) | Super Fight | 11 April 2007 | 1 | 2:00 | Pelotas, Brazil | |
| Win | 7–0 | Silverio Bueno | KO (punches) | Paranaguá Fight 1 | 24 March 2007 | 1 | 0:42 | Paranaguá, Brazil | |
| Win | 6–0 | Claudio Mattos | KO (punches) | Tsunamy 4 | 7 October 2006 | 1 | 2:00 | Pelotas, Brazil | |
| Win | 5–0 | Rogerio Farias | KO (knees and punches) | Coliseu Fight | 8 July 2006 | 1 | 4:00 | Pelotas, Brazil | |
| Win | 4–0 | Anderson Brito | KO (punch) | Tsunamy 3 | 9 April 2005 | 1 | 4:00 | Pelotas, Brazil | |
| Win | 3–0 | Josimar Lira Rodrigues | Decision (unanimous) | Tsunamy 2 | 11 December 2004 | 1 | 15:00 | Pelotas, Brazil | |
| Win | 2–0 | Andre Rocha | TKO (punches) | Camaqua Open Vale Tudo | 21 November 2004 | 1 | 4:00 | Camaquã, Brazil | |
| Win | 1–0 | Guilherme Freitas | KO (knees) | Piratini Fight | 24 April 2004 | 1 | 3:30 | Piratini, Brazil | |

== See also ==
- List of Bellator MMA alumni
