= Brian Rogers (fighter) =

American sport wrestler and martial artist

- Born: February 15, 1984 (age 42); Kent, Ohio, United States
- Other names: The Professional Predator
- Height: 5 ft 11 in (1.80 m)
- Weight: 205.3 lb (93.1 kg; 14.66 st)
- Division: Light Heavyweight; Middleweight
- Reach: 73 in (185 cm)
- Stance: Orthodox
- Fighting out of: Independence, Ohio, United States
- Team: Victory Martial Arts (formerly); Strong Style Fight Team (2007–2014); Factory X Muay Thai (2014–present)
- Rank: Brown belt in Isshin-ryū Karate; Purple Belt in Brazilian jiu-jitsu
- Years active: 2008–present

Mixed martial arts record
- Total: 23
- Wins: 14
- By knockout: 10
- By submission: 2
- By decision: 2
- Losses: 9
- By knockout: 4
- By decision: 5

Other information
- University: Walsh University; University of Akron
- Mixed martial arts record from Sherdog

Brian Rogers (born February 15, 1984) is an American mixed martial artist currently competing in the Light Heavyweight division. A professional competitor since 2008, Rogers formerly competed for Bellator and Strikeforce.

== Background ==
Rogers was born and grew up in Kent, Ohio. He attended Theodore Roosevelt High School where he wrestled, played football and threw the shot disc. After high school, he was a four-year letter winner and a three-year starter as inside linebacker for the Walsh University Cavaliers between 2002 and 2005. Rogers was named All-Conference by the Mid States Football Association twice and left Walsh University second all time in career tackles. Rogers graduated with undergraduate degree in education and started training mixed martial arts in 2006. He later graduated with master's degree in education from University of Akron.

== Mixed martial arts career ==
=== Early career ===
Rogers started his professional MMA career at 1–2 with both losses coming by decision. He followed the slow start to his professional MMA career with 7 consecutive victories, all by first-round KO/TKO which included wins in both his Strikeforce and Bellator debuts.

=== Strikeforce ===
Rogers made his Strikeforce debut on March 5, 2011, at Strikeforce: Feijao vs. Henderson where he defeated Ian Rammel by TKO in the first round.

=== Bellator MMA ===
On May 21, 2011, it was announced that Rogers will be taking part in the Bellator Season Five Middleweight Tournament which begins on September 17, 2011. Rogers defeated Victor O'Donnell via TKO in the quarterfinal round at Bellator 50. In the semifinal round, Rogers lost to Alexander Shlemenko via TKO in the second round at Bellator 54.

On January 9, 2012, Rogers was announced as the first of eight participants in Bellator's Season 6 Middleweight Tournament. In the opening round, he faced Vitor Vianna on March 16, 2012, at Bellator 61 and won via KO in the first round. The knockout received incredible media and fan attention and has since had over 12k views on YouTube as one of Bellator's most popular videos in the promotion's history.

Rogers was scheduled to face Bruno Santos in the semifinal round of the Middleweight Tournament at Bellator 66. However, on April 16, 2012, it was revealed that Santos had to withdraw due to a shoulder injury and was replaced by Bellator newcomer Andreas Spang. After dominating most of the first two rounds, he was caught by a counter left hook which resulted in a KO loss.

In January 2013, Bellator announced Rogers as a competitor in the Season Eight Middleweight tournament. His Quarterfinal fight took place at Bellator 89 against Dan Cramer. He lost the fight via unanimous decision.

Rogers then participated in Bellator's Season Nine Middleweight tournament. The Quarterfinal bout took place on September 7, 2013, at Bellator 98 against Mikkel Parlo. Rogers lost via unanimous decision.

Rogers was scheduled to face Gary Tapusoa on March 21, 2014, at Bellator 113, however, the bout was cancelled when Tapusoa could not meet the requirements to fight. Rogers was set to face Johan Romming at Bellator 119 on May 9, 2014, however, the bout was cancelled when Romming pulled out due to undisclosed reasons. Rogers faced Adrian Miles at Bellator 119 and won via flying knee KO in the second round.

Rogers was expected to face James Irvin on September 19, 2014, at Bellator 125. However, Irvin pulled out of the bout due to injury and was replaced with Brett Cooper. Cooper then suffered a foot injury and pulled out of the bout, so Rogers faced promotional newcomer Rafael Carvalho. He lost the fight via TKO in the first round.

Rogers faced Joey Beltran at Bellator 136 on April 10, 2015. He lost the fight by split decision.

Rogers next moved to the Light Heavyweight division and faced Virgil Zwicker on December 4, 2015, at Bellator 147. He won the fight via submission in the second round.

Rogers faced UFC vet Alessio Sakara at Bellators first event in Italy on April 16, 2016, at Bellator 152. He lost via knockout in the second round.

== Personal life ==
Rogers spent the majority of his mma career training in Independence Ohio at Strong Style MMA. Strong Style MMA is home to the former UFC Heavyweight Champion Stipe Miocic. Other Strong Style UFC Veterans include Jessica Eye, Forrest Petz, Jeff Cox and Dan Bobish.

Rogers, an Ohio Native moved from his home state to Denver, Colorado in January 2014, to further his mma career. Rogers has not competed since March 2017. Rogers is now a business development and marketing professional.

== Mixed martial arts record ==
Professional record breakdown
23 matches	14 wins	9 losses
By knockout	10	4
By submission	2	0
By decision	2	5

Res.	Record	Opponent	Method	Event	Date	Round	Time	Location	Notes
Win	14–9	Canaan Grigsby	Decision (unanimous)	Paramount MMA 7	March 24, 2017	3	5:00	Denver, Colorado, United States	Won the vacant Paramount MMA Light Heavyweight Championship.
Win	13–9	Lewis Rumsey	TKO (punch)	RFO Big Guns 22	January 28, 2017	1	1:00	Mansfield, Ohio, United States	Catchweight bout of 220 lbs.
Loss	12–9	Alessio Sakara	KO (punches)	Bellator 152	April 16, 2016	2	2:29	Turin, Italy	
Win	12–8	Virgil Zwicker	Submission (arm-triangle choke)	Bellator 147	December 4, 2015	2	4:38	San Jose, California, United States	Light Heavyweight debut.
Loss	11–8	Joey Beltran	Decision (majority)	Bellator 136	April 10, 2015	3	5:00	Irvine, California, United States	
Loss	11–7	Rafael Carvalho	TKO (punches)	Bellator 125	September 19, 2014	1	3:06	Fresno, California, United States	
Win	11–6	Adrian Miles	KO (flying knee)	Bellator 119	May 9, 2014	2	1:29	Rama, Ontario, Canada	
Loss	10–6	Mikkel Parlo	Decision (unanimous)	Bellator 98	September 7, 2013	3	5:00	Uncasville, Connecticut, United States	Bellator Season Nine Middleweight Tournament Quarterfinal.
Loss	10–5	Dan Cramer	Decision (unanimous)	Bellator 89	February 14, 2013	3	5:00	Charlotte, North Carolina, United States	Bellator Season Eight Middleweight Tournament Quarterfinal.
Win	10–4	Dominique Steele	Decision (unanimous)	Bellator 78	October 26, 2012	3	5:00	Dayton, Ohio, United States	
Loss	9–4	Andreas Spang	KO (punch)	Bellator 66	April 20, 2012	2	3:34	Cleveland, Ohio, United States	Bellator Season Six Middleweight Tournament Semifinal.
Win	9–3	Vitor Vianna	KO (flying knee)	Bellator 61	March 16, 2012	1	4:14	Bossier City, Louisiana, United States	Bellator Season Six Middleweight Tournament Quarterfinal.
Loss	8–3	Alexander Shlemenko	TKO (knees)	Bellator 54	October 15, 2011	2	2:30	Atlantic City, New Jersey, United States	Bellator Season Five Middleweight Tournament Semifinal.
Win	8–2	Victor O'Donnell	TKO (head kick and punches)	Bellator 50	September 17, 2011	1	1:56	Hollywood, Florida, United States	Bellator Season Five Middleweight Tournament Quarterfinal.
Win	7–2	Ian Rammel	TKO (punches)	Strikeforce: Feijao vs. Henderson	March 5, 2011	1	4:23	Columbus, Ohio, United States	
Win	6–2	Robert Conner	TKO (flying knee and punches)	BUCB: Pride and Glory	January 15, 2011	1	3:07	Parma, Ohio, United States	
Win	5–2	Marcus Reynolds	TKO (punches)	BUCB: Raging Bull	October 23, 2010	1	1:32	Parma, Ohio, United States	
Win	4–2	Jason Jones	TKO (kick to the body and punch)	NAAFS: Fight Night in the Flats 6	June 5, 2010	1	0:52	Cleveland, Ohio, United States	
Win	3–2	Neal Craft	TKO (punches)	NAAFS: Caged Fury 10	March 27, 2010	1	2:21	Uhrichsville, Ohio, United States	
Win	2–2	Dan Bolden	KO (flying knee)	NAAFS: North Coast Showdown 4	October 24, 2009	1	1:14	Toledo, Ohio, United States	
Loss	1–2	Valter Roberto De Menezes	Decision (unanimous)	Shine Fights 1: Genesis	May 9, 2009	3	5:00	Columbus, Ohio, United States	Middleweight debut.
Win	1–1	Willie Smalls	Submission (triangle choke)	NAAFS: Rock N Rumble 2	August 23, 2008	1	2:34	Cleveland, Ohio, United States	
Loss	0–1	Daniel Akinyemi	Decision (unanimous)	Iron Ring	February 18, 2008	3	5:00	New Orleans, Louisiana, United States	
