= Norman Paraisy =

French mixed martial arts fighter

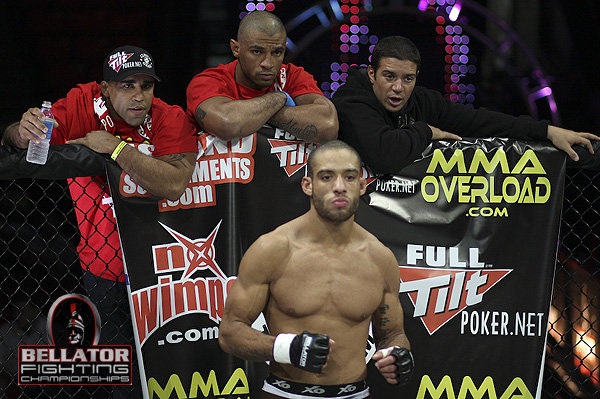
- Born: January 7, 1986 (age 40); Paris, France
- Height: 6 ft 0 in (1.83 m)
- Weight: 205 lb (93 kg; 14 st 9 lb)
- Division: Light Heavyweight; Middleweight
- Reach: 71 in (180 cm)
- Fighting out of: Paris, France
- Team: Kerner Team
- Years active: 2006-2019

Mixed martial arts record
- Total: 25
- Wins: 16
- By knockout: 3
- By submission: 5
- By decision: 8
- Losses: 6
- By submission: 3
- By decision: 3
- Draws: 2
- No contests: 1

Other information
- Mixed martial arts record from Sherdog

Norman Paraisy (born January 7, 1986) is a French former mixed martial artist, who competed in the middleweight division. He is known for being a contestant on The Ultimate Fighter 11 and 23. Paraisy also competed in the Bellator Fighting Championships: Season One as a welterweight and also competed in Bellator Fighting Championships: Season Six and Bellator Fighting Championships: Season Eight as a middleweight. He held the PFC SHC and FMC belt and was a contender for the CWFC belt.

== Mixed martial arts career ==
=== Early career ===
Paraisy made his pro debut on April 11, 2006, against Paulo Santos. he won via rear-naked choke in the 2nd round. Paraisy then won his next three fights before having a No Contest against Hiroki Ozaki at GCM: Cage Force EX Eastern Bound.

In his next fight, Paraisy took on former DEEP Welterweight Champion Hidehiko Hasegawa. He won via majority decision.

=== Bellator MMA ===
Paraisy made his Bellator debut in the first welterweight tournament against former UFC Middleweight Champion Dave Menne. He lost via submission in the third round, the first loss of his career.

On September 14, 2011, it was announced that Bellator had signed Paraisy and that he would compete in the Season Six middleweight tournament.

In the opening round of the tournament Paraisy took on former UFC vet Maiquel Falcão. He lost via unanimous decision.

Paraisy's next fight in Bellator was in the Season Eight middleweight tournament against Brett Cooper. He lost via unanimous decision.

=== The Ultimate Fighter 11: Team Liddell vs. Team Ortiz ===
Paraisy was seen in the very first episode of The Ultimate Fighter 11. Norman took on James Hammortree in the elimination bout to see which fight gets into the house. At the end of round one Paraisy was unable to answer the bell Hammortree was declared the winner.

=== Post TUF 11 ===
After Paraisy fought on the Ultimate Fighter and sent home, Norman took on Jason Muldoon at FH - Fight Club 4. He won via Submission.

He then took on Shaun Lomas. He won via submission.

In his next fight, he took Giullaume Piquet at FMC - Fighting Marcou Challenge 4. He won via TKO and capture the middleweight title.

Paraisy had a draw in his next fight against Michele Verginelli on April 30, 2011.

On May 20, 2011, Paraisy took on former PRIDE superstar Paulo Filho at X-Combat Ultra - International Grand Prix. He won via unanimous decision.

Paraisy took on Jack Mason in his next fight. He won via TKO.

For Paraisy's next fight he took on Manuel Garcia at PFC 5 - Clash of the Titans, for the middleweight title. He won via TKO.

Paraisy is expected to take on Chris Fields at CWFC 55 - Cage Warriors Fighting Championship 55 which is headlined by former UFC vet Che Mills. The fight ended in a majority draw.

He won the SHC belt in Switzerland in 2013 defeating his opponent after 3 rounds of ground and pound.

After defeating Allan Love at Cage Warriors Fight Night 10 in Jordan, he fought Jack Hermansson for CWFC middleweight title at CWFC 69 - Super Saturday, in London.

== Mixed martial arts record ==
Professional record breakdown
25 matches	16 wins	6 losses
By knockout	3	0
By submission	5	3
By decision	8	3
Draws	2	
No contests	1	

Res.	Record	Opponent	Method	Event	Date	Round	Time	Location	Notes
Loss	14–6–2 (1)	Alan Carlos	Decision (unanimous)	Cage Warriors 93	April 28, 2018	3	5:00	Gothenburg, Sweden	
Loss	14–5–2 (1)	Kenneth Bergh	Submission (guillotine choke)	Cage Warriors 84	June 2, 2017	2	2:13	London, England	Light Heavyweight bout
Loss	14–4–2 (1)	Jack Hermansson	Submission (rear-naked choke)	Cage Warriors 69	June 7, 2014	4	4:49	London, England	For the vacant Cage Warriors Middleweight Championship.
Win	14–3–2 (1)	Allan Love	Decision (unanimous)	Cage Warriors: Fight Night 10	March 28, 2014	3	5:00	Amman, Jordan	
Win	13–3–2 (1)	Boubacar Balde	Decision (unanimous)	Strength and Honor Championship 8	September 21, 2013	3	5:00	Geneva, Switzerland	
Win	12–3–2 (1)	Leeroy Barnes	Decision (unanimous)	Cage Warriors 57	July 20, 2013	3	5:00	Liverpool, England UK	
Draw	11–3–2 (1)	Chris Fields	Draw (majority)	Cage Warriors 55	June 1, 2013	3	5:00	Dublin, Ireland	Catchweight (190 lbs) bout
Win	11–3–1 (1)	Manuel Garcia	TKO (kicks)	PFC 5 - Clash of the Titans	April 27, 2013	1	2:15	Marseille, France	
Loss	10–3–1 (1)	Brett Cooper	Decision (unanimous)	Bellator 89	February 14, 2013	3	5:00	Charlotte, North Carolina, United States	Bellator Season 8 Middleweight Tournament Quarterfinal
Loss	10–2–1 (1)	Maiquel Falcão	Decision (unanimous)	Bellator 61	March 16, 2012	3	5:00	Bossier City, Louisiana, United States	Bellator Season 6 Middleweight Tournament Quarterfinal
Win	10–1–1 (1)	Jack Mason	TKO (flying knee and elbows)	Cage Warriors: 43	July 9, 2011	3	3:50	Kentish Town, North London, England	
Win	9–1–1 (1)	Paulo Filho	Decision (unanimous)	X-Combat Ultra: International Grand Prix	May 20, 2011	3	5:00	Campos dos Goytacazes, Rio de Janeiro, Brazil	
Draw	8–1–1 (1)	Michele Verginelli	Draw	Strength and Honor Championship 4: Monson vs. Perak	April 30, 2011	3	5:00	Geneva, Switzerland	
Win	8–1 (1)	Giullaume Piquet	TKO (punches)	Fighting Marcou Challenge 4	April 15, 2011	3	N/A	Palavas-les-Flots, Herault, France	
Win	7–1 (1)	Shaun Lomas	Submission (arm-triangle choke)	Shoot & Sprawl 2	October 2, 2010	1	3:11	Northampton, Northamptonshire, England	
Win	6–1 (1)	Jason Muldoon	Submission (arm-triangle choke)	Fighters Hive: Fight Club 4	September 3, 2010	1	N/A	Bathgate, West Lothian, Scotland	
Loss	5–1 (1)	Dave Menne	Submission (rear-naked choke)	Bellator IV	April 17, 2009	3	2:39	Norman, Oklahoma, United States	Season 1 Welterweight Tournament Quarterfinal
Win	5–0 (1)	Hidehiko Hasegawa	Decision (majority)	M-1 Challenge 6: Korea	August 29, 2008	2	5:00	South Korea	
NC	4–0 (1)	Hiroki Ozaki	No contest (overturned)	Greatest Common Multiple: Cage Force EX Eastern Bound	February 11, 2008	2	0:37	Tokyo, Japan	Originally a submission win for Ozaki, but later changed to a no contest.
Win	4–0	Dave Radford	Submission (choke)	Ultimate Force 6: Battle of Waterloo	July 21, 2007	1	4:53	England	
Win	3–0	Edgar Pilrimis	Submission (rear-naked choke)	Intense Fighting: Caged	November 11, 2006	1	2:46	England	
Win	2–0	Rustam Kuraev	Decision (split)	M-1 MFC: Mix-Fight	October 7, 2006	3	5:00	Russia	
Win	1–0	Paulo Santos	Submission (rear-naked choke)	Minotauro Fights 3	April 11, 2006	2	N/A	Salvador, Bahia, Brazil	Pro Debut

=== Mixed martial arts exhibition record ===
Exhibition record breakdown		
1 match	0 wins	1 loss
By knockout	0	1

Res.	Record	Opponent	Method	Event	Date	Round	Time	Location	Notes
Loss	0–2	Elias Urbina	Decision (unanimous)	The Ultimate Fighter: Team Joanna vs. Team Cláudia	January 26, 2016	3	5:00	Las Vegas, Nevada, United States	The Ultimate Fighter: Team Joanna vs. Team Cláudia Preliminary round
Loss	0–1	James Hammortree	TKO (quit)	The Ultimate Fighter: Team Liddell vs. Team Ortiz	March 31, 2010	1	5:00	Las Vegas, Nevada, United States	The Ultimate Fighter: Team Liddell vs. Team Ortiz Preliminary round
