= 2008 in Fighting Network Rings =

Mixed martial arts events

Information
- First date: March 30, 2008
- Last date: December 20, 2008

Events
- Total events: 4

Fights
- Total fights: 95

Chronology
2007 in RINGS	2008 in Fighting Network Rings	2009 in RINGS

The year 2008 is the 14th year in the history of Fighting Network Rings, a mixed martial arts promotion based in Japan. In 2008 Fighting Network Rings held 4 events beginning with, Rings: The Outsider.

== Events list ==
#	Event Title	Date	Arena	Location
103	Rings: The Outsider 4	December 20, 2008	Differ Ariake Arena	Tokyo, Japan
102	Rings: The Outsider 3	October 19, 2008	Differ Ariake Arena	Tokyo, Japan
101	Rings: The Outsider 2	July 19, 2008	Differ Ariake Arena	Tokyo, Japan
100	Rings: The Outsider	March 30, 2008	Differ Ariake Arena	Tokyo, Japan

== Rings: The Outsider ==
Rings: The Outsider was an event held on March 30, 2008, at Differ Ariake Arena in Tokyo, Japan.

=== Results ===
Main Card
Weight class				Method	Round	Time	Notes
	Tomoya Kato	def.	Hideyuki Yokuni	TKO (Punches)	2	1:40
	Junji Urita	def.	Ayumu Kusunoki	TKO (Doctor Stoppage)	1	2:40
	Yuji Takagaki	def.	Hiroki Nakamura	Submission (Guillotine Choke)	1	1:36
	Naoki Akimoto	def.	Tatsuya Ueda	TKO (Doctor Stoppage)	1	3:00
	Tomoaki Hata	def.	Satoshi Watanabe	TKO (Punches)	1	0:52
	Keinosuke Yoshinaga	def.	Takayuki Urano	TKO (Punches)	1	1:58
	Teppei Hori	def.	Masahiko Saito	Submission (Armbar)	1	0:15
	Eiji Ogawa	def.	Hironobu Takahashi	TKO (Punches)	2	0:39
	Ken Nishizawa	def.	Momomaru Harada	TKO (Punches)	1	1:16
	Tsuyoshi Nomura	def.	Mitsusuke Okugawa	Submission (Rear-Naked Choke)	1	1:15
	Asato Hashimoto	vs.	Yutaka Inada	Draw (Split)	2	3:00
	Yosuke Ota	def.	Isamu Taniguchi	TKO (Doctor Stoppage)	1	3:00
	Hisato Izawa	def.	Yusuke Gondai	Decision (Majority)	2	3:00
	Tomokazu Sakai	def.	Nobuhiro Ubukata	Submission (Armbar)	1	1:03
	Hiroyuki Hayashi	def.	Lethal Fat Boy	KO (Punch)	1	2:51
	Kazuhiko Oyama	def.	Naoki Umehara	Decision (Unanimous)	2	3:00
	Daisuke Fujii	def.	Go Hishinuma	TKO (Punches)	2	1:30
	Shunta Nakamura	vs.	Akihiro Fujisawa	Draw (Split)	2	3:00
	Yusuke Kobayashi	def.	Shingo Hamada	TKO (Punches)	1	0:40
	Tsuguaki Yamazaki	def.	Hidetora Hidetora	Decision (Unanimous)	2	3:00
	Shuhei Kawabata	def.	Kazuya Okamoto	Submission (Rear-Naked Choke)	2	0:41
	Tsubasa Akiyama	def.	Takahiro Kuroishi	Submission (Rear-Naked Choke)	1	1:24

== Rings: The Outsider 2 ==
Rings: The Outsider 2 was an event held on July 19, 2008, at Differ Ariake Arena in Tokyo, Japan.

=== Results ===
Main Card
Weight class				Method	Round	Time	Notes
	Seishiro Shimizu	def.	Hiroshi Kawaguchi	KO (Punches)	1	1:20
	Tsubasa Akiyama	def.	Yuji Takagaki	Decision (Unanimous)	2	3:00
	Keinosuke Yoshinaga	def.	Junpei Nakamura	Submission (Triangle Choke)	1	0:50
	Kazuhiko Oyama	def.	Yuki Takei	TKO (Punches)	1	1:48
	Masahiro Otani	def.	Junji Urita	TKO (Punches)	1	0:28
	Shinji Otake	def.	Kamikaze Tobimaru	Submission (Rear-Naked Choke)	2	2:07
	Toshiharu Yamauchi	def.	Kazuki Nagasawa	TKO (Punches)	1	1:53
	Teppei Hori	def.	Tsuyoshi Yamaguchi	Submission (Armbar)	1	1:00
	Tomokazu Sakai	def.	Shin Shin	Decision (Unanimous)	2	3:00
	Hiroshi Sato	def.	Momomaru Harada	Submission (Armbar)	2	1:32
	Daisuke Hayashi	def.	Koji Nakanishi	Submission (Armbar)	2	1:22
	Hidetora Hidetora	def.	Yusuke Gondai	KO (Punches)	1	0:28
	Shunta Nakamura	def.	Daisuke Maku	Decision (Majority)	2	3:00
	Kazuhiro Okubo	def.	Masomichi Suita	TKO (Head Kick and Punches)	1	2:59
	Masatomi Yoshida	def.	Yasuhiro Nonaka	KO (Spinning Back Kick)	2	2:46
	Takashi Tomoda	def.	Tomoyuki Tsuruma	TKO (Doctor Stoppage)	1	1:03
	Yoshitaka Ideta	def.	Satoru Seo	TKO (Punches and Knees)	1	0:49
	Tatsuya Watanabe	def.	Hiroki Nakamura	Submission (Guillotine Choke)	1	0:32
	Tomohiro Tamai	def.	Mitsuharu Abe	TKO (Punches)	1	1:59
	Tsuyoshi Nomura	def.	Kazuki Iwamoto	Submission (Armbar)	1	0:56
	Ryohei Masuda	def.	Takahiro Kuroishi	KO (Punch)	1	0:02
	Makoto Toriumi	def.	Kiichiro Kiichiro	TKO (Doctor Stoppage)	2	1:30
	Hiroya Kato	def.	Norihisa Takada	TKO (Punches)	2	1:08
	Tomomi Takashima	def.	Toru Toru	Decision (Majority)	2	3:00

== Rings: The Outsider 3 ==
Rings: The Outsider 3 was an event held on October 19, 2008, at Differ Ariake Arena in Tokyo, Japan.

=== Results ===
Main Card
Weight class				Method	Round	Time	Notes
	Masaru Kawamura	def.	Leo Takahashi	KO (Knee)	1	2:46
	Keinosuke Yoshinaga	def.	Yuichi Eda	Submission (Armbar)	1	1:30
	Joji Ogawa	def.	Kenta Tamura	KO (Punch)	1	2:32
	Kazuhiko Oyama	def.	Hiroshi Sato	Decision (Majority)	2	3:00
	Hidetora Hidetora	def.	Tatsuya Ueda	Decision (Unanimous)	2	3:00
	Koji Nakanishi	def.	Masomichi Suita	KO (Punches)	1	2:49
	Yohei Matsuoka	def.	Terukazu Murayama	KO (Punches)	1	2:53
	Tsuyoshi Nomura	def.	Masahiro Otani	KO (Punch)	2	0:12
	Satoshi Kanechika	def.	Takashi Ofuji	Decision (Unanimous)	2	3:00
	Tsubasa Akiyama	def.	Takashi Tomoda	Decision (Majority)	2	3:00
	Yutaka Naito	def.	Mitsuharu Abe	KO (Punch)	1	1:08
	Kamikaze Tobimaru	def.	Tsuyoshi Hayakawa	Submission (Armbar)	2	0:31
	Junichi Kichima	def.	Masayoshi Izuka	Submission (Kimura)	2	0:47
	Minechika Matsumoto	def.	Kazuki Iwamoto	Decision (Unanimous)	2	3:00
	Norihisa Takada	def.	Go Hishinuma	Decision (Majority)	2	3:00
	Nobuaki Nakagawa	def.	Akiyuki Akaishi	Submission (Rear-Naked Choke)	1	1:23
	Yoshikazu Kaneshima	def.	Isamu Okubo	TKO (Punches)	1	2:14
	Yuichi Kishino	def.	Ken Watanabe	KO (Punch)	1	0:35
	Asuka Mikami	def.	Hiroki Nakamura	KO (Punch)	1	1:03
	Masato Kobayashi	def.	Tomohiro Tamai	KO (Punches)	1	0:04
	Kenichi Tsuya	def.	Hisashi Yamamoto	TKO (Punches)	1	2:15
	Hisashi Yamamoto	def.	Chise Umeki	TKO (Punches)	1	1:08
	Daisuke Maku	def.	Aran Watabiki	Submission (Rear-Naked Choke)	1	0:12
	Masaharu Tsuchihashi	def.	Pero Pero	Submission (Rear-Naked Choke)	2	0:56
	Takayuki Urano	def.	Tsuyoshi Yamaguchi	KO (Punch)	1	2:59

== Rings: The Outsider 4 ==
Rings: The Outsider 4 was an event held on December 20, 2008, at Differ Ariake Arena in Tokyo, Japan.

=== Results ===
Main Card
Weight class				Method	Round	Time	Notes
	Tomoya Kato	def.	Seishiro Shimizu	TKO (Punches)	2	0:36
	Tetsuya Sano	def.	Keinosuke Yoshinaga	TKO (Knees and Punches)	2	2:59
	Yuji Takagaki	def.	Keigo Kuriyama	Decision (Unanimous)	2	3:00
	Hidetora Hidetora	def.	Hisato Izawa	TKO (Punches)	1	2:05
	Yuki Takei	def.	Shoki Shoki	Decision (Majority)	2	3:00
	Teppei Hori	def.	Hiroya Kato	Submission (Triangle Choke)	2	1:16
	Nobutsuna Komori	vs.	Takahiro Kuroishi	NC (Kuroishi Threw Punch Before Fight Began)	1	0:00
	Takashi Tomoda	def.	Hisashi Yamamoto	KO (Punch)	1	1:13
	Kaiji Hirano	def.	Ryohei Masuda	Submission (Armbar)	1	1:28
	Katsuji Yuki	def.	Joji Ogawa	TKO (Punches)	1	2:23
	Ayumu Ayumu	def.	Masoto Shimojo	TKO (Punches)	2	2:24
	Tatsuya Watanabe	def.	Hiroyuki Naito	TKO (Punches)	2	1:17
	Tomoyuki Manabe	def.	Kamikaze Tobimaru	Submission (Rear-Naked Choke)	1	1:39
	Yoshihiro Saegusa	def.	Yohei Matsuoka	Submission (Rear-Naked Choke)	1	2:41
	Takumi Sugita	def.	Tadashi Amemiya	Technical Submission (Scarf Hold)	1	2:58
	Fumihiro Yamada	def.	Yuji Tsuchiya	Submission (Armbar)	1	0:32
	Yujiro Sekiya	def.	Atsushi Kuroda	TKO (Punches)	1	2:39
	Yasuhiro Nonaka	vs.	Yoshinobu Iwama	Draw (Unanimous)	2	3:00
	Akiyuki Akaishi	def.	Toshiyuki Koyanagi	KO (Punch)	1	1:50
	Yoshitaka Ideta	def.	Tatsuru Suzuki	KO (Punches)	1	0:35
	Yoshikazu Kaneshima	def.	Nobuaki Nakagawa	Submission (Kimura)	1	1:11
	Daisuke Maku	def.	Nanmin Sato	Decision (Unanimous)	2	3:00
	Kenichiro Otani	def.	Ryo Masuda	TKO (Punches)	2	1:37
	Minechika Matsumoto	def.	Masaya Shimonaka	TKO (Punches)	1	2:14

== See also ==
- Fighting Network Rings
- List of Fighting Network Rings events
