= 2011 in Fighting Network Rings =

Mixed martial arts events

Information
- First date: February 13, 2011
- Last date: November 13, 2011

Events
- Total events: 5

Fights
- Total fights: 136

Chronology
2010 in RINGS	2011 in Fighting Network Rings	2012 in RINGS

The year 2011 is the 17th year in the history of Fighting Network Rings, a mixed martial arts promotion based in Japan. In 2011 Fighting Network Rings held 5 events beginning with, Rings: The Outsider 15.

== Events list ==
#	Event title	Date	Arena	Location
118	Rings: The Outsider 19	November 13, 2011	Yokohama Cultural Gymnasium	Yokohama, Kanagawa, Japan
117	Rings: The Outsider 18	August 14, 2011	Differ Ariake Arena	Tokyo, Japan
116	Rings: The Outsider 17	July 17, 2011	Differ Ariake Arena	Tokyo, Japan
115	Rings: The Outsider 16	May 8, 2011	Yokohama Cultural Gymnasium	Yokohama, Kanagawa, Japan
114	Rings: The Outsider 15	February 13, 2011	Differ Ariake Arena	Tokyo, Japan

== Rings: The Outsider 15 ==
Rings: The Outsider 15 was an event held on February 13, 2011 at The Differ Ariake Arena in Tokyo, Japan.

=== Results ===
Main Card
Weight class				Method	Round	Time	Notes
	Keinosuke Yoshinaga	def.	Shingo Matsuda	Decision (Unanimous)	2	3:00
	Ryo Asami	def.	Hisato Izawa	KO (Punch)	1	1:35
	Daisuke Maku	def.	Yohei Matsuoka	TKO (Punches)	1	1:34
	Tatsuya Watanabe	vs.	Yuta Nakane	Draw	2	3:00
	Tsuyoshi Nomura	def.	Shinya Yamazaki	Submission (Armbar)	2	0:57
	Teppei Hori	def.	Yoshiki Yoshiki	TKO (Corner Stoppage)	2	0:02
	Masato Masato	def.	Shunta Nakamura	KO (Punches)	2	1:56
	Ikki Miyanaga	def.	Sokokuryu Sokokuryu	Submission (Armbar)	1	2:06
	Tsukasa Kato	def.	Hikaru Watanabe	Submission (Triangle Choke)	2	1:20
	Kazuyuki Numajiri	def.	Makoto Toriumi	TKO (Punches)	2	1:55
	Takayuki Urano	def.	Yukihiro Omachi	Submission (Kimura)	1	1:39
	Yuki Takei	def.	Yoshikazu Kaneshima	KO (Punches)	1	0:30
	Yusuke Hagiwara	def.	Ryuma Anno	Submission (Triangle Choke)	1	2:46
	Yuya Seino	def.	Jin Hirayama	TKO (Punches)	1	1:26
	Mamoru Kusaka	def.	Junichi Ishino	TKO (Corner Stoppage)	2	2:42
	Tomonari Koinuma	def.	Tomohiro Zushi	KO (Punch)	1	0:43
	Katsuya Nagamine	def.	Yoshiro Sato	Submission (Triangle Choke)	1	1:43
	Takahiro Sakurai	def.	Masahiko Saito	TKO (Punches)	2	2:07
	Tomohiro Ikehata	def.	Hiroshi Yoshida	TKO (Doctor Stoppage)	1	1:55
	Hanamichi Hanamichi	def.	Yusuke Chigira	Submission (Rear-Naked Choke)	2	0:51
	Yuki Mogi	def.	Saburo H.N.	TKO (Punches)	2	1:54
	Shotaro Sato	def.	Shuichiro Akiyama	Submission (Triangle Choke)	1	2:04
	Yuki Ono	def.	Zenkichi Zenkichi	TKO (Punches)	1	2:09
	Rei Kawahara	def.	Hiroto Sakuma	TKO (Punches)	1	1:47
	Masaki Otsuka	def.	Kazuki Otsuka	TKO (Doctor Stoppage)	1	0:58
	Yu Shimada	def.	Futro Futro	KO (Knee)	2	2:27
	Taiki Kase	def.	Norimasa Kubota	Submission (Armbar)	1	0:40
	Kazuki Hata	def.	Dan Nogawa	KO (Punches)	1	1:07

== Rings: The Outsider 16 ==
Rings: The Outsider 16 was an event held on May 8, 2011 at The Yokohama Cultural Gymnasium in Yokohama, Kanagawa, Japan.

=== Results ===
Main Card
Weight class				Method	Round	Time	Notes
	Hisato Izawa	def.	Ryo Asami	Decision (Unanimous)	3	3:00
	Toshiaki Okura	def.	Toshi Nakamura	Decision (Unanimous)	2	3:00
	Tetsuya Sano	def.	Yusuke Hagiwara	Decision (Majority)	2	3:00
	Yuki Yamamoto	def.	Teppei Hori	TKO (Corner Stoppage)	2	1:24
	Tatsuya Watanabe	def.	Yusuke Uehara	TKO (Doctor Stoppage)	1	2:22
	Kentaro Yorimitsu	def.	Yoshihiro Saegusa	KO (Punch)	2	3:14
	Go Hishinuma	def.	Atsushi Saito	Submission (Armbar)	1	2:47
	Asaki Honda	def.	Takahiro Sakurai	DQ (Head-Butt)	1	3:56
	Vitali Krat	def.	Ikki Miyanaga	KO (Punch)	1	0:04
	Konstantin Kireev	def.	Takahiro Kuroishi	Technical Submission (Guillotine Choke)	1	1:25
	Bagama Nikabagamaev	def.	Hiroyuki Tani	Submission (Guillotine Choke)	1	1:37
	Asuka Mikami	def.	Yuta Nakane	Submission (Rear-Naked Choke)	2	2:07
	Tatsuya Nakazawa	vs.	Yoshiro Sato	Draw	2	3:00
	Shin Shin	def.	Yuki Ono	Submission (Rear-Naked Choke)	1	0:41
	Tomohiro Adaniya	def.	Masato Masato	Decision (Unanimous)	2	3:00
	Godhand Okui	def.	Masashi Toyama	KO (Punch)	1	1:45
	Manabu Atsumi	def.	Hanamichi Hanamichi	TKO (Doctor Stoppage)	1	2:03
	Takashi Miyagi	def.	Kenta Tanoue	Submission (Armbar)	1	0:44
	Yujiro Sekiya	def.	Katsuya Nagamine	Decision (Unanimous)	2	3:00
	Shuhei Sone	def.	Masaya Baba	TKO (Punches)	2	0:45
	Kintaro Kintaro	def.	Chikazu Osaki	KO (Punch)	1	0:06
	Tsukasa Kato	def.	Kosuke Kobayashi	TKO (Punches)	1	0:50
	Takaaki Murata	def.	Ryuya Ryuya	KO (Punch)	1	1:10
	Yoshiaki Miyara	vs.	Yuta Tetsuka	Draw	2	3:00
	Cardoso Shandre	def.	Hayato Osawa	TKO (Doctor Stoppage)	1	1:36
	Masamichi Nonaka	def.	So Narisako	TKO (Corner Stoppage)	2	1:16
	Masaharu Tsuchihashi	def.	R.S. Ryo	TKO (Punches)	1	2:12

== Rings: The Outsider 17 ==
Rings: The Outsider 17 was an event held on July 17, 2011 at The Differ Ariake Arena in Tokyo, Japan.

=== Results ===
Main Card
Weight class				Method	Round	Time	Notes
	Yojiro Uchimura	def.	Keinosuke Yoshinaga	TKO (Corner Stoppage)	2	3:56
	Naoyuki Kotani	def.	Ryo Asami	TKO (Doctor Stoppage)	1	1:00
	Keigo Hirayama	vs.	Hiroyuki Tani	Draw	2	5:00
	Takayuki Urano	def.	Ryuma Anno	Submission (Armbar)	1	1:07
	Yusuke Hagiwara	def.	Manabu Atsumi	Submission (Triangle Choke)	1	1:45
	Hiroshi Sato	def.	Takehiro Higuchi	TKO (Punches)	1	2:54
	Tomohiro Adaniya	def.	Masaharu Tsuchihashi	TKO (Punches)	1	1:47
	Tetsuya Sano	def.	Yoshiki Yoshiki	Submission (Rear-Naked Choke)	1	2:51
	Yohei Tagami	def.	Yuji Takagaki	TKO (Punches)	1	1:02
	Atsushi Saito	def.	Largo Largo	TKO (Doctor Stoppage)	1	1:10
	Naoya Murakami	def.	Yuya Seino	Submission (Rear-Naked Choke)	1	0:44
	Kazuki Nakajima	def.	Mamoru Kusaka	TKO (Punches)	1	1:29
	Hidesaburo Hidesaburo	def.	Toshihiro Tamura	TKO (Doctor Stoppage)	2	0:26
	Kintaro Kintaro	def.	Toshio Futagawa	TKO (Punches)	1	2:19
	Takashi Tomoda	def.	Tomonari Koinuma	Submission (Rear-Naked Choke)	1	1:39
	Takashi Miyagi	def.	Sojun Kurama	Submission (Armbar)	1	1:11
	Yuki Mogi	def.	Tsutomu Yaesen	TKO (Punches)	1	0:39
	Ryosuke Ogawa	vs.	Toji Ueno	Draw	2	3:00
	Emerson Jie	def.	Shotaro Sato	Submission (Armbar)	2	0:58
	Taisei Taisei	def.	Konosuke Mekaru	Submission (Kimura)	2	0:38
	Reiha Nozawa	def.	Yujiro Yano	Submission (Guillotine Choke)	1	1:04
	Yu Yoshii	def.	Akihito Nagashima	Submission (Keylock)	1	2:12
	Hikaru Watanabe	def.	Mondo Kiyokawa	TKO (Punches)	1	0:43
	Issei Matsuo	def.	Satoshi Watanabe	TKO (Punches)	1	2:00
	Yusuke Noguchi	def.	Shogun Shogun	Submission (Armbar)	1	1:27
	Toru Sakuta	def.	Jin Naka	Submission (Armbar)	1	1:46
	Tsuyoshi Shimamoto	def.	Kazuya Sudo	TKO (Doctor Stoppage)	2	0:35
	Ryo Asami	def.	Shin Kitagawa	Submission (Triangle Choke)	1	2:21

== Rings: The Outsider 18 ==
Rings: The Outsider 18 was an event held on August 14, 2011 at The Differ Ariake Arena in Tokyo, Japan.

=== Results ===
Main Card
Weight class				Method	Round	Time	Notes
	Hiroyuki Tani	def.	Go Hishinuma	Decision (Unanimous)	2	3:00
	Tetsuya Sano	def.	Takayuki Urano	Decision (Unanimous)	2	3:00
	Tomohiro Adaniya	def.	Hiroshi Sato	KO (Punch)	1	0:04
	Yusuke Hagiwara	def.	Yoshihiro Saegusa	KO (Head Kick)	1	0:16
	Kazuki Nakajima	def.	Shuhei Sone	TKO (Punches)	1	1:46
	Jun Maedajima	def.	Hikaru Watanabe	Decision (Unanimous)	2	3:00
	Yuta Ueta	def.	Hirotaka Yanai	Submission (Armbar)	2	1:05
	Ryuma Anno	def.	Yuya Seino	Decision (Majority)	2	3:00
	Yuki Mogi	def.	Kenjiro Yamaki	TKO (Punches)	2	1:00
	Fuma Fuma	def.	Yuichi Eda	TKO (Doctor Stoppage)	1	1:29
	Yoshiro Sato	def.	Kazuya Sudo	Decision (Unanimous)	2	3:00
	Yu Shimada	def.	Daisuke Kiyota	TKO (Punches)	1	1:05
	Shotaro Sato	def.	Yuta Nishizawa	Submission (Rear-Naked Choke)	1	2:05
	Ryuya Masuda	def.	Keichi Iio	TKO (Punches)	2	2:59
	Yukihiro Omachi	def.	Hisashi Imai	TKO (Punches)	1	1:32
	Shigeyuki Takamori	def.	Toji Ueno	TKO (Doctor Stoppage)	2	2:35
	Tatsumasa Saito	def.	Sokokuryu Sokokuryu	Submission (Triangle Choke)	1	1:26
	Call Yamazaki	def.	Ryosuke Taihei	Decision (Unanimous)	2	3:00
	Akihito Mamiya	def.	Douglas Douglas	DQ	1	3:00
	Yuki Saito	def.	Ryuya Ryuya	Decision (Majority)	2	3:00
	Hiroyuki Tani	def.	Hanamichi Hanamichi	TKO (Doctor Stoppage)	1	2:27
	Takayuki Urano	def.	Yoshihiro Saegusa	TKO (Punches)	1	0:48
	Tetsuya Sano	def.	Yusuke Hagiwara	Decision (Unanimous)	2	3:00
	Tomohiro Adaniya	def.	Yoshiaki Miyara	Decision (Majority)	2	3:00

== Rings: The Outsider 19 ==
Rings: The Outsider 19 was an event held on November 13, 2011 at The Yokohama Cultural Gymnasium in Yokohama, Kanagawa, Japan.

=== Results ===
Main Card
Weight class				Method	Round	Time	Notes
	Keinosuke Yoshinaga	def.	Tetsuya Sano	Decision (Unanimous)	2	3:00
	Hisato Izawa	def.	Hiroyuki Tani	Decision (Unanimous)	3	3:00
	Daisuke Maku	def.	Tomohiro Adaniya	Submission (Guillotine Choke)	1	1:49
	Nobuyuki Kanaizuka	vs.	Kazuhiko Oyama	Draw (Unanimous)	2	3:00
	Vitali Krat	def.	Ryo Asami	TKO (Punches)	2	2:55
	Konstantin Kireev	def.	Kentaro Yorimitsu	TKO (Corner Stoppage)	1	0:56
	Teppei Hori	def.	William Onaya	Decision (Majority)	2	3:00
	Kazuki Nakajima	def.	Tiago Shiokawa	TKO (Punches)	2	0:51
	Shinya Kumazawa	def.	Henri Kakiuchi	Submission (Kimura)	1	2:46
	Takahiro Kuroishi	def.	Yuta Takizawa	Submission (Triangle Choke)	1	1:58
	Ikki Miyanaga	def.	Fumihiro Yamada	TKO (Doctor Stoppage)	2	1:44
	Yusuke Hagiwara	vs.	Makoto Toriumi	Draw (Unanimous)	2	3:00
	Atsushi Saito	def.	Yu Yoshii	Submission (Armbar)	1	1:07
	Tomonari Koinuma	def.	Manabu Atsumi	TKO (Punches)	2	0:04
	Yusuke Fujita	vs.	Takayuki Urano	Draw (Unanimous)	2	3:00
	Kazuyuki Numajiri	def.	Ryuma Anno	TKO (Punches)	1	2:43
	Masato Masato	vs.	Kenta Tanoue	Draw (Split)	2	3:00
	Takehiro Osada	def.	Takeo Iida	Decision (Majority)	2	3:00
	Yuki Mogi	def.	Yasuaki Yasuaki	TKO (Doctor Stoppage)	1	1:58
	Takehiro Higuchi	def.	Kintaro Kintaro	Technical Submission (Armbar)	1	0:24
	Ryo Asami	def.	Yuta Tetsuka	Decision (Majority)	2	3:00
	Hiroki Fujimoto	def.	Pierrot Otsuka	TKO (Punches)	1	0:20
	Diemerson Hatta	def.	Masamichi Nonaka	Technical Submission (Armbar)	2	1:00
	Hitoshi Matsumoto	def.	Jin Naka	Technical Submission (Rear-Naked Choke)	1	2:35
	Yoshiaki Miyara	def.	Munetaka Ogawa	Decision (Majority)	2	3:00
	Kazuki Iwamoto	def.	Reiha Nozawa	TKO (Doctor Stoppage)	1	0:34
	Masaharu Tsuchihashi	def.	Shotaro Sato	Decision (Majority)	2	3:00
	Kenshin Hirokawa	def.	Taisei Taisei	Submission (Rear-Naked Choke)	1	2:49
	Yuya Seino	def.	Masakatsu Wada	Submission (Rear-Naked Choke)	1	2:03

== See also ==
- Fighting Network Rings
- List of Fighting Network Rings events
