= 2010 in Fighting Network Rings =

Mixed martial arts events

Information
- First date: February 14, 2010
- Last date: December 4, 2010

Events
- Total events: 5

Fights
- Total fights: 129

Chronology
2009 in RINGS	2010 in Fighting Network Rings	2011 in RINGS

The year 2010 is the 16th year in the history of Fighting Network Rings, a mixed martial arts promotion based in Japan. In 2010 Fighting Network Rings held 5 events beginning with, Rings: The Outsider 10.

== Events list ==
#	Event title	Date	Arena	Location
113	Rings: The Outsider 14	December 4, 2010	Differ Ariake Arena	Tokyo, Japan
112	Rings: The Outsider 13	October 11, 2010	Yokohama Cultural Gymnasium	Yokohama, Kanagawa, Japan
111	Rings: The Outsider 12	June 20, 2010	Differ Ariake Arena	Tokyo, Japan
110	Rings: The Outsider 11	April 3, 2010	Differ Ariake Arena	Tokyo, Japan
109	Rings: The Outsider 10	February 14, 2010	Differ Ariake Arena	Tokyo, Japan

== Rings: The Outsider 10 ==
Rings: The Outsider 10 was an event held on February 14, 2010 at The Differ Ariake Arena in Tokyo, Japan.

=== Results ===
Main Card
Weight class				Method	Round	Time	Notes
	Teppei Hori	def.	Mamoru Mamoru	Submission (Rear-Naked Choke)	1	1:14
	Toshiaki Okura	def.	Hiroyuki Saito	Decision (Unanimous)	2	3:00
	Keichi Iio	def.	Tomokazu Sakai	TKO (Punches)	1	1:56
	Shuhei Sone	def.	Hirohito Shiojima	TKO (Punches)	1	2:24
	Yuichi Eda	def.	Rei Kawahara	Decision (Unanimous)	2	3:00
	Junichi Ishino	def.	Hisashi Imai	TKO (Punches)	1	0:24
	Tomoyoshi Tateno	def.	Kazuyuki Numajiri	TKO (Punches)	1	2:06
	Yuki Oyama	def.	Taichi Tanaka	TKO (Leg Kicks)	2	1:46
	Kosei Takimoto	def.	Suguru Nii	KO (Spinning Back Fist)	1	1:06
	Yusuke Noguchi	def.	Yuji Tanaka	Submission (Armbar)	1	1:44
	Ikki Miyanaga	def.	Tomoya Oki	TKO (Doctor Stoppage)	1	2:59
	Tsubasa Akiyama	def.	Kaiji Hirano	Decision (Unanimous)	2	3:00
	Tatsuya Watanabe	def.	Yuji Takagaki	KO (Punch)	1	2:02
	Hanamichi Hanamichi	def.	Shingo D2	Decision (Split)	2	3:00
	Yoshiaki Miyara	def.	Yujiro Yano	TKO (Punches)	2	0:38
	Yutaka Shimane	def.	Yuta Ueta	Submission (Rear-Naked Choke)	1	1:33
	Shusaku Wada	def.	Yoshifumi Ishiki	TKO (Punches)	1	2:10
	Daisuke Maku	def.	Mitsuru Igarashi	TKO (Punches)	1	1:03
	Takashi Tomoda	def.	Yuta Horikiri	Decision (Unanimous)	2	3:00
	Yuta Tetsuka	def.	Kei Kobayashi	KO (Punch)	1	0:08
	Tomoyasu Kakuta	def.	Teruki Tanaka	TKO (Punches)	1	0:08
	Masaharu Tsuchihashi	def.	Kamikaze Tobimaru	Submission (Rear-Naked Choke)	1	0:40
	Yohei Matsuoka	def.	Yujiro Sekiya	KO (Punch)	1	0:50

== Rings: The Outsider 11 ==
Rings: The Outsider 11 was an event held on April 3, 2010 at The Differ Ariake Arena in Tokyo, Japan.

=== Results ===
Main Card
Weight class				Method	Round	Time	Notes
	Daisuke Maku	def.	Yoshiaki Miyara	Decision (Split)	2	3:00
	Shusaku Wada	def.	Takahiro Kuroishi	TKO (Punches)	2	1:52
	Tatsuya Watanabe	def.	Yohei Matsuoka	KO (Punch)	1	0:58
	Asuka Mikami	def.	Hiroaki Motegi	KO (Punch)	2	1:26
	Fumihiro Yamada	def.	Minechika Matsumoto	Submission (Armbar)	1	1:33
	Teppei Hori	def.	Kazuhiro Takeuchi	Decision (Unanimous)	2	3:00
	Yasuhiro Ebisawa	def.	Yuya Yuya	TKO (Punches)	1	0:03
	Wink Suzuki	def.	Shunsuke Totsuka	TKO (Punches)	1	0:35
	Yuta Nakane	def.	Kei Ichimonji	KO (Punch)	1	0:05
	Ryuma Anno	def.	Ryuya Ryuya	Submission (Triangle Choke)	1	1:31
	Tomoki Kaimai	def.	Leo Takahashi	TKO (Punches)	1	2:21
	Yuta Ueta	def.	Junpei Nakamura	Submission (Rear-Naked Choke)	1	2:46
	Tatsumasa Saito	def.	Pedro Kimura	KO (Punch)	1	0:04
	Go Hishinuma	def.	Kenjiro Yamaki	Submission (Achilles Lock)	1	1:51
	Yoshihiro Saegusa	def.	Ikki Miyanaga	TKO (Punches)	2	1:32
	Daisuke Maku	def.	Tomoyasu Kakuta	TKO (Punches)	1	1:26
	Yoshiaki Miyara	def.	Yutaka Shimane	KO (Punch)	1	1:57
	Takahiro Kuroishi	def.	Yuta Tetsuka	TKO (Punches)	1	2:50
	Shusaku Wada	def.	Hanamichi Hanamichi	TKO (Punches)	2	0:27
	Yohei Matsuoka	def.	Masaharu Tsuchihashi	Decision (Split)	2	3:00
	Tatsuya Watanabe	def.	Tsubasa Akiyama	Decision (Split)	2	3:00
	Hiroaki Motegi	def.	Pero Pero	TKO (Punches)	1	1:45
	Asuka Mikami	def.	Hisashi Yamamoto	Decision (Unanimous)	2	3:00

== Rings: The Outsider 12 ==
Rings: The Outsider 12 was an event held on June 20, 2010 at The Differ Ariake Arena in Tokyo, Japan.

=== Results ===
Main Card
Weight class				Method	Round	Time	Notes
	Daisuke Maku	def.	Tatsuya Watanabe	Decision (Unanimous)	2	3:00
	Keinosuke Yoshinaga	def.	Tsuyoshi Nomura	Submission (Triangle Choke)	1	2:14
	Hisato Izawa	def.	Kazuhiko Oyama	Decision (Unanimous)	2	3:00
	Kazuhiro Takeuchi	def.	Takeo Shiina	KO (Punch)	1	0:11
	Hiroyuki Tani	def.	Go Hishinuma	Decision (Unanimous)	2	3:00
	Teppei Hori	def.	Tatsumasa Saito	TKO (Punches)	1	1:27
	Seishiro Shimizu	def.	Ryuma Anno	Submission (Rear-Naked Choke)	1	2:08
	Yuichi Eda	def.	Yuki Oyama	KO (Punch)	1	2:35
	Yujiro Yano	def.	Yu Kobayashi	Technical Submission (Armbar)	1	2:30
	Akihito Mamiya	def.	Kazuhito Yoshima	TKO (Punches)	1	1:30
	Tatsushi Tatsushi	def.	Takuya Takuya	TKO (Doctor Stoppage)	1	0:58
	Takeo Iida	def.	Matthias Matthias	Submission (Triangle Choke)	1	1:53
	Takehiro Higuchi	def.	Yujiro Sekiya	Submission (Armbar)	1	0:21
	Takahiro Owaki	def.	Asim Matsuki	DQ (Rope Grabbing)	2	2:27
	Munetaka Ogawa	def.	Kosuke Kobayashi	TKO (Punches)	2	0:47
	Yuta Ueta	def.	Hayato Osawa	Decision (Majority)	2	3:00
	Yoshinobu Iwama	def.	Yuji Takagaki	TKO (Punches)	2	0:46
	Shintaro Furuguchi	def.	Kenshin Hirokawa	KO (Punch)	1	1:44
	Daisuke Maku	def.	Shusaku Wada	Submission (Armbar)	1	1:12
	Tatsuya Watanabe	def.	Hikaru Watanabe	TKO (Punches)	1	1:14
	Tomoyoshi Tateno	def.	Junichi Ishino	Submission (Armbar)	2	0:33
	Kazuhiko Oyama	def.	Tetsuya Sano	KO (Punch)	1	0:07
	Takeo Shiina	def.	Masaki Tayanagi	TKO (Doctor Stoppage)	1	0:55
	Kazuhiro Takeuchi	def.	Motomichi Mori	Decision (Unanimous)	2	3:00
	Go Hishinuma	def.	Shuhei Sone	TKO (Corner Stoppage)	1	3:00
	Hiroyuki Tani	def.	Manabu Atsumi	TKO (Punches)	1	1:10
	Teppei Hori	def.	Fumihiro Yamada	TKO (Punches)	2	1:51
	Tatsumasa Saito	def.	Minechika Matsumoto	Decision (Unanimous)	2	3:00

== Rings: The Outsider 13 ==
Rings: The Outsider 13 was an event held on October 11, 2010 at The Yokohama Cultural Gymnasium in Yokohama, Kanagawa, Japan.

=== Results ===
Main Card
Weight class				Method	Round	Time	Notes
	Masayuki Okude	def.	Keinosuke Yoshinaga	Submission (Armbar)	2	1:39
	Kazuhiko Oyama	def.	Yutaka Shimamura	TKO (Punches)	2	4:56
	Masayuki Hamagishi	def.	Tetsuya Sano	Technical Submission (Armbar)	1	3:12
	Yuki Yamamoto	def.	Takayuki Urano	Technical Submission (Armbar)	1	0:58
	Toshihiro Shimizu	def.	Yuki Takei	Submission (Rear-Naked Choke)	1	1:27
	Hisato Izawa	def.	Hiroyuki Tani	Decision (Unanimous)	2	3:00
	Lion Lion	def.	Yoshitaka Ideta	TKO (Doctor Stoppage)	1	1:22
	Ryuma Anno	def.	Mayhem Mayhem	TKO (Ankle Injury)	1	0:23
	Takahiro Kuroishi	def.	Sam Aguilar	KO (Knee)	1	0:18
	Fumihiro Yamada	def.	David The Beast	DQ (Knee to Downed Opponent)	1	0:21
	Yoshihiro Saegusa	def.	The Great	TKO (Doctor Stoppage)	1	0:27
	Toshi Nakamura	def.	Hanamichi Hanamichi	KO (Punches)	1	0:25
	Ryo Endo	def.	Yusuke Iwanuma	Decision (Majority)	2	3:00
	Yoshikazu Kaneshima	def.	Takashi Tomoda	Technical Submission (Rear-Naked Choke)	1	1:14
	Kazuyuki Numajiri	def.	Yutaka Shimane	Decision (Majority)	2	3:00
	Yoshiro Sato	def.	Yuji Takagaki	Decision (Unanimous)	2	3:00
	Ryuya Ryuya	def.	Yujiro Yano	TKO (Punches)	1	2:40
	Dr. K	def.	Hisashi Imai	Decision (Unanimous)	2	3:00
	Ikki Miyanaga	def.	Yuki Oyama	Decision (Majority)	2	3:00
	Takeo Iida	def.	Akito Suzuki	Technical Submission (Crucifix)	1	0:27
	Hisato Izawa	def.	Shintaro Furuguchi	Submission (Rear-Naked Choke)	1	1:46
	Hiroyuki Tani	def.	Teppei Hori	Decision (Unanimous)	2	3:00
	Takahiro Sakurai	def.	Tatsumasa Saito	Decision (Majority)	2	3:00
	Yusuke Fujita	def.	Yujiro Sekiya	Decision (Majority)	2	3:00
	Hiroaki Motegi	def.	Hirohito Shiojima	Decision (Split)	2	3:00
	Munetaka Ogawa	def.	Keichi Iio	Decision (Unanimous)	2	3:00
	Kazuya Sudo	def.	Shin Shin	Decision (Unanimous)	2	3:00
	Yuta Nakane	def.	Makoto Nishimoto	TKO (Doctor Stoppage)	1	0:52
	Takehiro Higuchi	def.	Fernando Kamal	Submission (Rear-Naked Choke)	2	1:06

== Rings: The Outsider 14 ==
Rings: The Outsider 14 was an event held on December 4, 2010 at The Differ Ariake Arena in Tokyo, Japan.

=== Results ===
Main Card
Weight class				Method	Round	Time	Notes
	Teppei Hori	def.	Tetsuya Sano	TKO (Corner Stoppage)	2	2:41
	Tsubasa Akiyama	vs.	Tatsuya Watanabe	Draw	2	3:00
	Yusuke Fujita	def.	Seishiro Shimizu	TKO (Punches)	2	2:09
	Kazuyuki Numajiri	def.	Hikaru Hasumi	Submission (Keylock)	2	0:50
	Yuta Tetsuka	def.	Shinji Otake	Decision (Unanimous)	2	3:00
	Mamoru Kusaka	def.	Naoto Yamaguchi	TKO (Punches)	1	2:14
	Yuta Ueta	vs.	R.S. Ryo	No Contest	1	0:00
	Hikaru Watanabe	vs.	Yuki Kamimura	Draw	2	3:00
	Yohei Matsuoka	def.	Yobobo Yobobo	TKO (Punches)	2	2:04
	Takaaki Murata	def.	Tomohiro Zushi	TKO (Punches)	2	2:04
	Kazuki Nakajima	def.	Go Hishinuma	TKO (Doctor Stoppage)	1	1:51
	Takeo Iida	def.	Tomoyoshi Tateno	Submission (Keylock)	2	0:47
	Yuji Takagaki	def.	Kenta Kato	TKO (Punches)	2	1:49
	Kaoru Toyama	def.	Hitoshi Okada	Decision (Split)	2	3:00
	Yoshiki Yoshiki	def.	Kenjiro Yamaki	Submission (Guillotine Choke)	1	0:41
	Takahiro Takahiro	def.	Yuko Sono	Decision (Unanimous)	2	3:00
	Yusuke Noguchi	def.	Machi Machi	Submission (Hammer Lock)	2	1:44
	Yuya Seino	def.	Takuya Yamaoka	TKO (Punches)	1	1:53
	Go Harada	def.	Shingo Yoshihama	TKO (Doctor Stoppage)	1	0:43
	Masato Masato	def.	Ryosuke Ogawa	TKO (Punches)	2	1:18
	Jin Hirayama	def.	Kamikaze Tobimaru	Submission (Armbar)	1	1:13
	Tsuyoshi Shimamoto	def.	Shotaro Sato	Submission (Rear-Naked Choke)	1	1:15
	Tsukasa Kato	def.	Makoto Ishimura	TKO (Punches)	1	0:32
	Ryuya Ryuya	def.	Hiroshi Matsumotonochi	TKO (Punches)	1	1:00
	Hayato Osawa	def.	Yaminokeno Yaminokeno	TKO (Punches)	1	2:35
	Call Yamazaki	def.	Alex Alex	Submission (Armbar)	2	0:50

== See also ==
- Fighting Network Rings
- List of Fighting Network Rings events
