= 2009 in Fighting Network Rings =

Mixed martial arts events

Information
- First date: March 15, 2009
- Last date: December 13, 2009

Events
- Total events: 5

Fights
- Total fights: 112

Chronology
2008 in RINGS	2009 in Fighting Network Rings	2010 in RINGS

The year 2009 is the 15th year in the history of Fighting Network Rings, a mixed martial arts promotion based in Japan. In 2009 Fighting Network Rings held 5 events beginning with, Rings: The Outsider 5.

== Events list ==
#	Event title	Date	Arena	Location
108	Rings: The Outsider 9	December 13, 2009	Differ Ariake Arena	Tokyo, Japan
107	Rings: The Outsider 8	October 11, 2009	Differ Ariake Arena	Tokyo, Japan
106	Rings: The Outsider 7	August 9, 2009	Differ Ariake Arena	Tokyo, Japan
105	Rings: The Outsider 6	May 5, 2009	Differ Ariake Arena	Tokyo, Japan
104	Rings: The Outsider 5	March 15, 2009	Ryogoku Kokugikan	Tokyo, Japan

== Rings: The Outsider 5 ==
Rings: The Outsider 5 was an event held on March 15, 2009, at Ryogoku Kokugikan in Tokyo, Japan.

=== Results ===
Main Card
Weight class				Method	Round	Time	Notes
	Hidetora Hidetora	def.	Keinosuke Yoshinaga	KO (Punches)	1	1:04
	Tomoya Kato	def.	Kazuhiko Oyama	TKO (Knees)	1	1:35
	Yutaka Naito	def.	Asuka Mikami	Decision (Unanimous)	2	3:00
	Masato Kobayashi	def.	Yuji Takagaki	Decision (Unanimous)	2	3:00
	Yoshitaka Ideta	def.	Masaru Kawamura	KO (Punches)	1	0:31
	Tsuyoshi Nomura	def.	Masayuki Sato	Submission (Armbar)	1	1:20
	Kazuhiro Takeuchi	def.	Nojin Nojin	TKO (Corner Stoppage)	1	1:58
	Shunta Nakamura	def.	Daisuke Maku	TKO (Punches)	2	0:53
	Yuki Takei	def.	Takashi Tomoda	Decision (Majority)	2	3:00
	Yusuke Noguchi	def.	Takahiro Kuroishi	Technical Submission (Armbar)	2	1:39
	Toshi Nakamura	def.	Norihisa Takada	TKO (Knees and Punches)	1	1:54
	Manabu Atsumi	def.	Suguru Yoshida	TKO (Punches)	1	0:19
	Minechika Matsumoto	def.	Takashi Sato	Submission (Rear-Naked Choke)	2	2:21
	Tsubasa Akiyama	def.	Shingo D2	Submission (Heel Hook)	1	0:59
	Leo Takahashi	def.	Yuta Chiba	TKO (Doctor Stoppage)	2	0:31
	Akira Iezaki	def.	Kenya Kenya	TKO (Punches)	1	0:49
	Kaiji Hirano	def.	Eisuke Tachibana	Technical Submission (Armbar)	1	1:53
	Mitsunari Hada	def.	Kosei Takimoto	TKO (Punches)	1	2:18
	Hanamichi Hanamichi	def.	Satoshi Noguchi	TKO (Doctor Stoppage)	1	1:21
	Kamikaze Tobimaru	def.	Masahiro Otani	TKO (Punches)	2	2:54
	Tatsuya Watanabe	def.	Shin Shin	TKO (Doctor Stoppage)	1	1:28
	Yoshikazu Kaneshima	def.	Yujiro Sekiya	TKO (Punches)	1	2:20

== Rings: The Outsider 6 ==
Rings: The Outsider 6 was an event held on May 5, 2009, at Differ Ariake Arena in Tokyo, Japan.

=== Results ===
Main Card
Weight class				Method	Round	Time	Notes
	Ryuji Takada	def.	Asuka Mikami	Decision (Majority)	2	3:00
	Tetsuya Sano	def.	Minechika Matsumoto	TKO (Knee and Punches)	1	1:26
	Toshi Nakamura	def.	Hiroya Kato	TKO (Punches)	1	1:05
	Kazuhiro Takeuchi	def.	Fumihiro Yamada	Decision (Majority)	2	3:00
	Hikaru Watanabe	def.	Yohei Matsuoka	TKO (Punches)	2	0:52
	Yuta Horikiri	def.	Kaiji Hirano	Decision (Unanimous)	2	3:00
	Izumi Nakahata	def.	Douglas Douglas	TKO (Doctor Stoppage)	2	0:54
	Go Hishinuma	def.	Hanamichi Hanamichi	KO (Punches)	1	2:23
	Kazuhito Yoshima	def.	Hisashi Imai	TKO (Punches)	1	0:49
	Takayuki Urano	def.	Masayoshi Izuka	KO (Punches)	1	0:08
	Takehiro Higuchi	def.	Tomohiro Tamai	TKO (Punches)	1	1:39
	Kamikaze Tobimaru	def.	Toshiyuki Koyanagi	Submission (Armbar)	1	1:15
	Takuya Imanami	def.	Satoshi Noguchi	KO (Punch)	1	1:47
	Mitsuru Igarashi	def.	Chise Umeki	Submission (Armbar)	1	0:33
	Kazuki Iwamoto	def.	Isao Tamogami	Submission (Rear-Naked Choke)	1	1:11
	Shingo D2	vs.	Makoto Nakagawa	Draw	2	3:00
	Yoshisato Chiba	def.	Tatsuya Watanabe	Submission (Rear-Naked Choke)	1	2:16

== Rings: The Outsider 7 ==
Rings: The Outsider 7 was an event held on August 9, 2009, at Differ Ariake Arena in Tokyo, Japan.

=== Results ===
Main Card
Weight class				Method	Round	Time	Notes
	Keinosuke Yoshinaga	def.	Tsuyoshi Yamaguchi	Submission (Guillotine Choke)	1	0:19
	Tsuyoshi Nomura	def.	Teppei Hori	Decision (Split)	2	3:00
	Hanamichi Hanamichi	def.	Ryuma Anno	Submission (Guillotine Choke)	1	2:33
	Yoshihiro Saegusa	def.	Satoshi Noguchi	TKO (Punches)	1	1:31
	Yoshikazu Kaneshima	def.	Hiroyasu Mikawa	TKO (Punches)	2	2:23
	Shuhei Kawabata	def.	Eiji Goto	Submission (Neck Crank)	2	2:36
	Takayuki Urano	def.	Shinjiro Tsuji	TKO (Punches)	1	1:17
	Makoto Toriumi	def.	Daisuke Maku	TKO (Doctor Stoppage)	1	5:00
	Daisuke Hayashi	def.	Satoshi Katayama	KO (Punch)	1	0:41
	Yuichi Kishino	def.	Yuta Kanda	Submission (Rear-Naked Choke)	1	0:58
	Takuya Imanami	def.	Kamikaze Tobimaru	Submission (Rear-Naked Choke)	1	1:45
	Takahiro Kuroishi	def.	Kiriro Mano	Submission (Rear-Naked Choke)	1	1:29
	Ryuji Ryuji	def.	Kosei Takimoto	TKO (Punches)	2	0:50
	Yuki Takei	def.	Tsubasa Teranishi	TKO (Punches)	1	1:08
	Asuka Mikami	def.	Tatsuya Nakazawa	TKO (Punches)	1	2:41
	Kazuhiro Takeuchi	def.	Kazuhito Yoshima	KO (Punch)	1	2:16
	Yuji Takagaki	def.	Tomohiro Tamai	Submission (Triangle Armbar)	1	0:49
	Seishiro Shimizu	def.	Yuki Oyama	Submission (Armbar)	1	1:07
	Mitsuru Igarashi	def.	Akiyuki Akaishi	TKO (Doctor Stoppage)	1	2:51
	Yusuke Umeda	def.	Shoichi Suzuki	TKO (Punches)	2	2:06
	Nojin Nojin	def.	Takeshi Yaguchi	KO (Punch)	1	0:52
	Hirotoshi Ochiai	def.	Yoshitaka Ideta	TKO (Doctor Stoppage)	1	1:21
	Kazuyuki Numajiri	def.	Hidetsune Todoroki	Submission (Rear-Naked Choke)	2	0:47
	Koji Nakanishi	def.	Eijiro Kato	KO (Punch)	1	0:17
	Tsubasa Akiyama	def.	Hikaru Watanabe	TKO (Punches)	2	1:29

== Rings: The Outsider 8 ==
Rings: The Outsider 8 was an event held on October 11, 2009, at Differ Ariake Arena in Tokyo, Japan.

=== Results ===
Main Card
Weight class				Method	Round	Time	Notes
	Yuki Takei	def.	Takahiro Kuroishi	Submission (Armbar)	1	1:33
	Keinosuke Yoshinaga	def.	Yoshihiro Saegusa	Submission (Triangle Choke)	2	1:44
	Tetsuya Sano	def.	Manabu Atsumi	KO (Head Kick)	1	1:40
	Tsuyoshi Nomura	def.	Makoto Toriumi	KO (Punch)	1	0:20
	Asuka Mikami	def.	Yuki Oyama	Decision (Unanimous)	2	3:00
	Matthias Matthias	vs.	Hayato Osawa	Draw	2	3:00
	Toshi Nakamura	def.	Kazuhiro Takeuchi	TKO (Punches)	1	1:26
	Toshiaki Okura	def.	Jun Jun	TKO (Punches)	1	1:04
	Daisuke Maku	vs.	Tsubasa Akiyama	Draw	2	3:00
	Yusuke Ito	def.	Akiyoshi Eiichi	Decision (Unanimous)	2	5:00
	R.S. Ryo	def.	Yusuke Umeda	Technical Submission (Rear-Naked Choke)	1	2:17
	Tomokazu Sakai	def.	Mitsuru Igarashi	Submission (Armbar)	1	2:31
	Kamikaze Tobimaru	def.	Koji Nakanishi	TKO (Punches)	2	2:28
	Kosuke Takahashi	def.	Fusuke Fusuke	TKO (Punches)	2	0:23
	Yusuke Kitago	def.	Tatsuya Watanabe	TKO (Punches)	1	2:47
	Kazuyuki Numajiri	def.	Minechika Matsumoto	Decision (Split)	2	3:00
	Yuki Takei	def.	Yuichi Kishino	Submission (Armbar)	2	2:23
	Takahiro Kuroishi	def.	Kosei Takimoto	Submission (Triangle Choke)	1	2:50
	Yoshihiro Saegusa	def.	Hanamichi Hanamichi	TKO (Punches)	1	1:21
	Keinosuke Yoshinaga	def.	Takuya Imanami	Submission (Triangle Choke)	1	1:52
	Kazuhiko Oyama	def.	Teppei Hori	Decision (Unanimous)	2	3:00
	Tetsuya Sano	def.	Takayuki Urano	Decision (Split)	2	3:00
	Tsuyoshi Nomura	def.	Yoshikazu Kaneshima	Decision (Unanimous)	2	3:00
	Makoto Toriumi	def.	Shuhei Kawabata	TKO (Punches)	1	0:17

== Rings: The Outsider 9 ==
Rings: The Outsider 9 was an event held on December 13, 2009, at Differ Ariake Arena in Tokyo, Japan.

=== Results ===
Main Card
Weight class				Method	Round	Time	Notes
	Keinosuke Yoshinaga	def.	Tetsuya Sano	TKO (Head Kick)	2	0:36
	Takehiro Higuchi	def.	Yuji Takagaki	Submission (Rear-Naked Choke)	2	0:14
	Seishiro Shimizu	def.	Tatsuya Nakazawa	Submission (Armbar)	1	2:06
	Ryuma Anno	def.	Eisuke Tachibana	TKO (Punches)	2	1:12
	Yoshitaka Ideta	def.	Hiromichi Kobayashi	TKO (Punches)	2	1:23
	Motomichi Mori	def.	Nojin Nojin	TKO (Punches)	1	2:44
	G G	def.	Shunsuke Totsuka	Decision (Unanimous)	2	3:00
	Masaharu Tsuchihashi	vs.	Asuka Mikami	Draw (Majority)	2	3:00
	Yuko Sono	def.	Hitoshi Matsumoto	TKO (Punches)	2	2:59
	Shuhei Sone	def.	Munetaka Ogawa	TKO (Punches)	2	1:37
	Yutaka Shimane	def.	Ryohei Masuda	Submission (Guillotine Choke)	1	0:46
	Hiromi Ikeda	def.	Tomoya Aoki	Decision (Unanimous)	2	3:00
	Tomonari Koinuma	def.	Shuichi Kitanaka	TKO (Punches)	1	1:55
	Keinosuke Yoshinaga	def.	Yuki Takei	KO (Flying Knee)	1	0:37
	Tetsuya Sano	def.	Tsuyoshi Nomura	TKO (Punches)	1	2:57
	Yuta Ueta	def.	Kenta Kido	TKO (Punches)	1	1:32
	Teppei Hori	vs.	Hisato Izawa	Draw (Majority)	2	3:00
	Go Hishinuma	def.	Mamoru Kusaka	TKO (Punches)	1	1:46
	Nobutsuna Komori	def.	Mitsuru Igarashi	Decision (Majority)	2	3:00
	Gongoro Umeno	def.	Osamu Hatada	Decision (Unanimous)	2	3:00
	Kazuya Sudo	def.	Kosuke Takahashi	Technical Submission (Rear-Naked Choke)	1	1:24
	Takashi Tomoda	def.	Masahiro Otani	KO (Punches)	1	0:30
	Hayato Osawa	def.	Chao Lang Maoh	TKO (Corner Stoppage)	1	2:57
	Yoshisato Chiba	def.	Shin Shin	Decision (Unanimous)	2	3:00

== See also ==
- Fighting Network Rings
- List of Fighting Network Rings events
