= 2003 in Fighting Network Rings =

Mixed martial arts events

Information
- First date: January 31, 2003
- Last date: November 30, 2003

Events
- Total events: 7

Fights
- Total fights: 62

Chronology
2002 in RINGS	2003 in Fighting Network Rings	2004 in RINGS

The year 2003 is the ninth year in the history of Fighting Network Rings, a mixed martial arts promotion based in Japan. In 2003 Fighting Network Rings held 7 events beginning with, Rings Lithuania: Ronin.

== Events list ==
#	Event title	Date	Arena	Location
84	Rings Holland: I Have a Dream	November 30, 2003		Enschede, Holland
83	Rings Holland: The Untouchables	September 27, 2003	Vechtsebanen Sport Hall	Utrecht, Netherlands
82	Rings Lithuania: Rampage 2	August 3, 2003		Kupeta Bar Palanga, Lithuania
81	Rings Lithuania: Explosion	May 10, 2003	Night Club "COMBO"	Kaunas, Lithuania
80	Rings Lithuania: Bushido Rings 7: Adrenalinas	April 5, 2003		Vilnius, Lithuania
79	Rings Holland: Heroes of the Next Generation	March 30, 2003		Utrecht, Holland
78	Rings Lithuania: Ronin	January 31, 2003	Alytus Sports Hall	Alytus, Alytus County, Lithuania

== Rings Lithuania: Ronin ==
Rings Lithuania: Ronin was an event held on January 31, 2003, at the Alytus Sports Hall in Alytus, Alytus County, Lithuania.

=== Results ===
Main Card
Weight class				Method	Round	Time	Notes
	Ramunas Komas	def.	Rimantas Pukas	Submission (Armbar)	0	0:00
	Nerijus Valiukevicius	def.	Mindaugas Ratkevicius	Decision	2	5:00
	Erikas Petraitis	def.	Mamertas Maciukas	N/A	0	0:00
	Mamertas Maciukas	def.	Ramunas Sorius	N/A	0	0:00
	Erikas Petraitis	def.	Antanas Jazbutis	N/A	0	0:00
	Ramunas Sorius	def.	Adomas Audiskas	N/A	0	0:00
	Mamertas Maciukas	def.	Gediminas Zabotkus	N/A	0	0:00
	Erikas Petraitis	def.	Vaidas Valantinas	N/A	0	0:00
	Antanas Jazbutis	def.	Denisas Archirejevas	N/A	0	0:00

== Rings Holland: Heroes of the Next Generation ==
Rings Holland: Heroes of the Next Generation was an event held on March 30, 2003, in Utrecht, Holland.

=== Results ===
Main Card
Weight class				Method	Round	Time	Notes
	Marc Van Rooyen	def.	Chico Martinez	N/A	3	0:00
	Stefan Klever	def.	Brian Maulany	Submission (Choke)	2	1:43
	Mujdat Deniz	def.	Marco Merodio	Submission (Choke)	1	1:14
	Melvin Rusky	def.	Emir Smajlovic	Decision (1-0 Points)	2	3:00
	Metin Yakut	def.	Sergei Gul	Submission (Choke)	1	4:10
	Milco Voorn	def.	Autimio Antonia	DQ	1	1:48
	Marc Lange	vs.	Hesdey Wolfgang	Draw	2	3:00
	Dave van Heijningen	vs.	Werner van Kesteren	Draw	2	3:00
	Kelly de Jong	def.	Carlo Liauw-Anjie	KO	1	2:54
	Ivo Nijenhuis	def.	Xander Nel	Submission (Armlock)	2	2:31
	Mingoes Pelupessy	vs.	Alex van Suffelen	Draw	2	3:00

== Rings Lithuania: Bushido Rings 7: Adrenalinas ==
Rings Lithuania: Bushido Rings 7: Adrenalinas was an event held on April 5, 2003, in Vilnius, Lithuania.

=== Results ===
Main Card
Weight class				Method	Round	Time	Notes
	Fedor Emelianenko	def.	Egidijus Valavicius	Submission (Kimura)	2	1:13
	Mindaugas Kulikauskas	def.	Tadeush Cholodinskij	Decision	4	3:00
	Mindaugas Smirnovas	vs.	Naoyuki Kotani	Draw	3	3:00
	Antanas Jazbutis	def.	Hideo Tokoro	Decision (1-0 Points)	2	5:00
	Kestutis Smirnovas	def.	Mariusz Ligizynski	Submission (Kimura)	1	2:45
	Pavel Dolgov	def.	Rokas Stambrauskas	Decision	3	3:00
	Petras Markevicius	def.	Valdas Pocevicius	Decision	3	5:00

== Rings Lithuania: Explosion ==
Rings Lithuania: Explosion was an event held on May 10, 2003, at Night Club "COMBO" in Kaunas, Lithuania.

=== Results ===
Main Card
Weight class				Method	Round	Time	Notes
	Kestutis Smirnovas	def.	Kestutis Stankevicius	Decision	0	0:00
	Jordanas Poskaitis	def.	Grazhuydas Smailis	KO	0	0:00
	Grazhuydas Smailis	def.	Povilas Markevicius	Decision	0	0:00
	Povilas Markevicius	def.	Aleksej Dobrov	Submission (Armbar)	0	0:00
	Jordanas Poskaitis	def.	Petras Markevicius	Decision	0	0:00
	Povilas Markevicius	def.	Ernestas Slavickas	Submission (Armbar)	0	0:00
	Grazhuydas Smailis	def.	Igor Sulzhiskij	Submission (Armbar)	0	0:00
	Jordanas Poskaitis	def.	Rolandas Stember	Submission (Choke)	0	0:00
	Rolandas Stember	def.	Darius Vainutis	Decision	0	0:00
	Petras Markevicius	def.	Dainius Krishtopaitis	Submission (Armbar)	0	0:00

== Rings Lithuania: Rampage 2 ==
Rings Lithuania: Rampage 2 was an event held on August 3, 2003, at the Kupeta Bar in Palanga, Lithuania.

=== Results ===
Main Card
Weight class				Method	Round	Time	Notes
	Regimantas Bakas	def.	Linas Narkevicius	Submission (Armbar)	0	0:00
	Darius Skliaudys	def.	Antanas Jazbutis	Decision	0	0:00
	Valdas Pocevicius	def.	Nerijus Valiukevicius	Submission (Choke)	0	0:00
	Darius Jonyla	def.	Igor Sulzhiskij	N/A	0	0:00
	Ramunas Komas	def.	Dainius Krishtopaitis	Decision	0	0:00
	Raimundas Petrauskas	def.	Darius Vainutis	Decision	0	0:00
	Denisas Archirejevas	def.	Donatas Pechiulis	Submission (Choke)	0	0:00

== Rings Holland: The Untouchables ==
Rings Holland: The Untouchables was an event held on September 27, 2003, at Vechtsebanen Sport Hall in Utrecht, Netherlands.

=== Results ===
Main Card
Weight class				Method	Round	Time	Notes
	Cheick Kongo	def.	Dave Vader	Decision (Unanimous)	3	2:00
	Olaf in 't Veld	def.	Michael Knaap	Decision (Unanimous)	3	2:00
	Stephan Tapilatu	def.	Chico Martinez	Decision (Unanimous)	2	5:00
	Stefan Klever	def.	Marc van Rooyen	KO (Head Kick)	1	4:42
	Jordan Radev	def.	Nordin Bensellam	Submission (Toe Hold)	3	0:31
	Clarence Thompson	def.	Metin Yakut	TKO (Punches)	2	4:38
	Marco Merodio	def.	Orville Bovenschen	TKO (Punches)	2	0:21
	Mario Borzic	def.	Mujdat Deniz	TKO (Knees and Punches)	1	3:20
	Dave Dalgliesh	def.	Brian Arendsen	KO (Punch)	1	0:07
	Jan Overduin	def.	Paolo van Rooijen	Submission (Armbar)	1	1:36
	Kelly de Jong	vs.	Brian Maulany	Draw	2	5:00

== Rings Holland: I Have a Dream ==
Rings Holland: I Have a Dream was an event held on November 30, 2003, in Enschede, Holland.

=== Results ===
Main Card
Weight class				Method	Round	Time	Notes
	Robbie Nelson	def.	Chico Martinez	Decision (Unanimous)	2	5:00
	Marc Lange	def.	Danny de Jong	Submission (Armbar)	1	0:00
	Ricardo Turky	def.	Mo Fowzi	DQ	1	0:00
	Vincent Striesenau	def.	Fernando Martinez	Decision (Split)	2	3:00
	Stefan Boere	vs.	Bruno Tongeren	Draw	2	3:00
	Sam Turky	def.	Jeffrey Pedro	Submission (Heel Hook)	1	1:30
	Audy Cijntje	vs.	Tom van den Berkhof	Draw	2	3:00

== See also ==
- Fighting Network Rings
- List of Fighting Network Rings events
