= 2007 in Fighting Network Rings =

Mixed martial arts events

Information
- First date: March 25, 2007
- Last date: September 23, 2007

Events
- Total events: 2

Fights
- Total fights: 3

Chronology
| 2006 in RINGS | 2007 in Fighting Network Rings | 2008 in RINGS |

The year 2007 is the 13th year in the history of Fighting Network Rings, a mixed martial arts promotion based in Japan. In 2007 Fighting Network Rings held 2 events beginning with, Rings Holland: The Chosen Ones.

== Events list ==
| # | Event Title | Date | Arena | Location |
|---|---|---|---|---|
| 99 | Rings Gala: Risky Business | September 23, 2007 | | Netherlands |
| 98 | Rings Holland: The Chosen Ones | March 25, 2007 | Vechtsebanen Sport Hall | Utrecht, Netherlands |

== Rings Holland: The Chosen Ones ==
Rings Holland: The Chosen Ones was an event held on March 25, 2007 at Vechtsebanen Sport Hall in Utrecht, Netherlands.

=== Results ===
Main Card
| Weight class | | | | Method | Round | Time | Notes |
|---|---|---|---|---|---|---|---|
| | Dimitri Menger | def. | Stefan Kolik | Decision (Unanimous) | 2 | 5:00 |
| | Jason Jones | def. | Billy Echter | TKO (Punches) | 3 | 1:16 |
| | Jan Overduin | vs. | Romano de los Reyes | Draw | 2 | 5:00 |

== Rings Gala: Risky Business ==
Rings Gala: Risky Business was an event held on September 23, 2007 in The Netherlands.

== See also ==
- Fighting Network Rings
- List of Fighting Network Rings events
