= 2004 in Fighting Network Rings =

Mixed martial arts events

Information
- First date: April 4, 2004
- Last date: December 12, 2004

Events
- Total events: 4

Fights
- Total fights: 36

Chronology
2003 in RINGS	2004 in Fighting Network Rings	2005 in RINGS

The year 2004 is the tenth year in the history of Fighting Network Rings, a mixed martial arts promotion based in Japan. In 2004 Fighting Network Rings held 4 events beginning with, Rings Holland: World's Greatest.

== Events list ==
#	Event title	Date	Arena	Location
88	Rings Holland: Born Invincible	December 12, 2004	Vechtsebanen Sport Hall	Utrecht, Netherlands
87	Rings Holland: Local Heroes 2	October 30, 2004		Holland
86	Rings Holland: Two Heroes, One Winner	October 3, 2004		Nieuwegein, Holland
85	Rings Holland: World's Greatest	April 4, 2004	Vechtsebanen Sport Hall	Utrecht, Netherlands

== Rings Holland: World's Greatest ==
Rings Holland: World's Greatest was an event held on April 4, 2004 at the Alytus Sports Hall in Alytus, Alytus County, Lithuania.

=== Results ===
Main Card
Weight class				Method	Round	Time	Notes
	Cheick Kongo	def.	Joop Kasteel	KO (Punch)	1	4:31
	Rodney Glunder	def.	Dave Vader	Decision (Unanimous)	3	5:00
	Mario Borzic	def.	Kamil Uygun	KO (Knee)	1	2:43
	Sander Thonhauser	def.	Michael Knaap	KO (Punch)	2	4:45
	Hans Roovers	def.	Alex Holsvoogd	KO (Punch)	1	3:35
	Kelly de Jong	def.	Marc van Rooyen	Submission (Achilles Lock)	1	2:24
	Brian Maulany	def.	Andre Fyeet	Submission (Armbar)	1	1:00
	Dimitri Menger	def.	Stefan Lems	TKO (Punches)	1	0:58
	Chico Martinez	def.	Christos Petroutsos	Submission (Guillotine Choke)	3	1:30
	Stefan Boere	def.	Dennis von Schie	Submission (Armbar)	1	1:26

== Rings Holland: Two Heroes, One Winner ==
Rings Holland: Two Heroes, One Winner was an event held on October 3, 2004 at the Alytus Sports Hall in Alytus, Alytus County, Lithuania.

=== Results ===
Main Card
Weight class				Method	Round	Time	Notes
	Stefan Klever	def.	Marc Van Rooyen	N/A	0	0:00
	Satish Jamia	def.	Janos Tiborg	N/A	0	0:00
	Kanu Ghebrihiwet	def.	Maik Kubacki	N/A	0	0:00
	Rene Bloothoofd	def.	Paolo van Rooijen	N/A	0	0:00
	Tom van den Berkhof	def.	Marco Dritty	N/A	0	0:00
	Clyde van Dams	def.	Peter Mulder	N/A	0	0:00
	Ashley Peiter	def.	Geraldo Martina	N/A	0	0:00
	Romano de los Reyes	def.	Franklin Charro	N/A	0	0:00
	Paul Oguchukwu	def.	Jeffrey Pedro	N/A	0	0:00
	Billy Echter	def.	Fernando Martinez	N/A	0	0:00
	Jan Overduin	def.	Dennis von Schie	N/A	0	0:00
	Frank Smit	def.	Kurt de Boeck	N/A	0	0:00
	Michel Smits	def.	Dennis Brandenburg	N/A	0	0:00

== Rings Holland: Local Heroes 2 ==
Rings Holland: Local Heroes 2 was an event held on October 30, 2004 at the Alytus Sports Hall in Alytus, Alytus County, Lithuania.

=== Results ===
Main Card
Weight class				Method	Round	Time	Notes
	Ivo Nijenhuis	def.	Rene Roon	N/A	0	0:00
	Ricardo Turky	def.	Marc Lange	N/A	0	0:00
	Dave Powell	def.	Edwin Gertenbach	N/A	0	0:00
	Jelger Boogaard	def.	Jeffrey van Swieten	N/A	0	0:00

== Rings Holland: Born Invincible ==
Rings Holland: Born Invincible was an event held on December 12, 2004 at the Alytus Sports Hall in Alytus, Alytus County, Lithuania.

=== Results ===
Main Card
Weight class				Method	Round	Time	Notes
	Rob Van Esdonk	def.	Andre Tete	TKO (Punches)	1	0:43
	Colin Mannsur	def.	Danny Hoyer	Submission (Armbar)	1	2:56
	Ashley Peiter	def.	Dennis Scholten	KO (Punch)	1	2:28
	Sander Thonhauser	def.	Raoulet Salim	KO (Knee and Punches)	2	1:29
	Stefan Klever	def.	Siyar Bahadurzada	Decision (Unanimous)	2	5:00
	Chico Martinez	def.	Dennis de Rus	Decision (Unanimous)	2	5:00
	Brian Maulany	def.	Nordin Bensellam	TKO (Doctor Stoppage)	1	0:00
	Aydogan Nuralis	vs.	Dimitri Menger	Draw	2	5:00
	Peter Mulder	def.	Autimio Antonia	KO (Punch)	1	0:24

== See also ==
- Fighting Network Rings
- List of Fighting Network Rings events
