= 2006 in Fighting Network Rings =

Mixed martial arts events

Information
- First date: March 26, 2006
- Last date: November 19, 2006

Events
- Total events: 3

Fights
- Total fights: 13

Chronology
2005 in RINGS	2006 in Fighting Network Rings	2007 in RINGS

The year 2006 is the 12th year in the history of Fighting Network Rings, a mixed martial arts promotion based in Japan. In 2006 Fighting Network Rings held 3 events beginning with, Rings: Road to Japan.

== Events list ==
#	Event Title	Date	Arena	Location
97	Rings: Holland	November 19, 2006		Enschede, Holland
96	Rings Lithuania: Lekeciai 500	August 13, 2006		Lekeciai, Marijampole County, Lithuania
95	Rings: Road to Japan	March 26, 2006		Holland

== Rings: Road to Japan ==
Rings: Road to Japan was an event held on March 26, 2006 in Holland.

=== Results ===
Main Card
Weight class				Method	Round	Time	Notes
	Jordan Radev	def.	Brian Maulany	DQ (Rope Escapes)	1	N/A
	Jan Overduin	def.	Chico Martinez	Submission (Armbar)	1	N/A

== Rings Lithuania: Lekeciai 500 ==
Rings Lithuania: Lekeciai 500 was an event held on August 13, 2006 in Lekeciai, Marijampole County, Lithuania.

=== Results ===
Main Card
Weight class				Method	Round	Time	Notes
	Deividas Banaitis	def.	Tadas Sapoka	Submission (Triangle Choke)	1	1:23
	Povilas Andriusaitis	def.	Vaidas Paspirgelis	Decision	2	5:00
	Ignas Petkus	def.	Mindaugas Simonavicius	Submission (Armbar)	2	1:42
	Ernestas Sukaitis	def.	Evaldas Lukosevisius	Decision	2	5:00
	Vaidas Valancius	def.	Kestutis Zemaitaits	Submission (Armbar)	1	1:10
	Erikas Suslovas	def.	Ovidijus Antanaitis	Submission (Armbar)	2	2:45
	Dainius Dvylaitis	def.	Aivaras Povilaitis	Submission (Armbar)	1	2:23

== Rings: Holland ==
Rings: Holland was an event held on November 19, 2006 in Enschede, Holland.

=== Results ===
Main Card
Weight class				Method	Round	Time	Notes
	Chico Martinez	def.	Jan Overduin	Submission (Guillotine Choke)	2	1:45
	Ralf Wonnink	def.	Ramon Temmink	TKO	1	1:58
	Danial Sharifi	def.	Tom van den Berkhof	Submission (Leglock)	1	0:30
	Moien Takalou	def.	Vitali Urich	Submission (Armbar)	2	1:20

== See also ==
- List of Fighting Network Rings events
