= 2005 in Fighting Network Rings =

Mixed martial arts events

Information
- First date: March 12, 2005
- Last date: December 11, 2005

Events
- Total events: 6

Fights
- Total fights: 44

Chronology
2004 in RINGS	2005 in Fighting Network Rings	2006 in RINGS

The year 2005 is the 11th year in the history of Fighting Network Rings, a mixed martial arts promotion based in Japan. In 2005 Fighting Network Rings held 6 events beginning with, Rings: Bushido Ireland.

== Events list ==
#	Event title	Date	Arena	Location
94	Rings Holland: Men of Honor	December 11, 2005		Utrecht, Holland
93	Rings Ireland: Reborn	October 15, 2005		Ireland
92	Rings Russia: CIS vs. The World	August 20, 2005	Rings Sports Centrum	Yekaterinburg, Sverdlovsk Oblast, Russia
91	Rings Holland: Fighting Nordin Memorial Fight Gala	May 21, 2005	Sports Hall	Purmerend, Netherlands
90	Rings Holland: Armed and Dangerous	April 3, 2005	Vechtsebanen Sport Hall	Utrecht, Netherlands
89	Rings: Bushido Ireland	March 12, 2005		Ireland

== Rings: Bushido Ireland ==
Rings: Bushido Ireland was an event held on March 12, 2005 in Ireland.

=== Results ===
Main Card
Weight class				Method	Round	Time	Notes
	Oliver Ellis	def.	Tomas Murnikas	Submission (Armbar)	1	N/A
	Rob Broughton	def.	Andy Ryan	TKO (Punches)	1	N/A
	Gegard Mousasi	def.	John Donnelly	Submission (Armbar)	1	N/A
	Michael Leonard	def.	Kamon Rana	N/A	1	N/A
	Jason Clarke	def.	Colm O'Reilly	Decision	2	5:00
	Remigijus Kazaciunas	vs.	Valdas Pocevicius	Draw	2	5:00

== Rings Holland: Armed and Dangerous ==
Rings Holland: Armed and Dangerous was an event held on April 3, 2005 at the Vechtsebanen Sport Hall in Utrecht, Netherlands.

=== Results ===
Main Card
Weight class				Method	Round	Time	Notes
	Murad Chunkaiev	def.	Sander Thonhauser	Submission (Armbar)	1	2:01
	Dennis de Rus	def.	Robbie Nelson	Submission (Achilles Lock)	2	1:55
	Peter Mulder	def.	Rob van Esdonk	TKO (Knees and Punches)	1	1:03
	Nordin Bensellam	def.	Ashley Peiter	TKO (Elbow Injury)	1	0:43
	Stefan Klever	def.	Dennis Scholten	Decision (Unanimous)	3	3:00
	Marc Duncan	vs.	Jan Overduin	Draw	2	3:00
	Aydogan Nuralis	def.	Ali Mazidi	TKO (Punches)	2	1:26
	Jeffrey van Swieten	def.	Billy Echter	NC	1	1:00
	Danny van Bergen	def.	Danny Hoyer	NC	1	0:10

== Rings Holland: Fighting Nordin Memorial Fight Gala ==
Rings Holland: Fighting Nordin Memorial Fight Gala was an event held on May 21, 2005 at the Sports Hall in Purmerend, Netherlands.

=== Results ===
Main Card
Weight class				Method	Round	Time	Notes
	David Kaplan	def.	Xander Nel	Submission (Guillotine Choke)	1	0:42
	Younes Radihemi	vs.	Jeroen Westra	Draw	2	5:00

== Rings Russia: CIS vs. The World ==
Rings Russia: CIS vs. The World was an event held on August 20, 2005 at the Rings Sports Centrum in Yekaterinburg, Sverdlovsk Oblast, Russia.

=== Results ===
Main Card
Weight class				Method	Round	Time	Notes
	Sergei Kharitonov	def.	Peter Mulder	Submission (Armbar)	1	6:16
	Bazigit Atajev	def.	Beneilton Pereira da Silva	TKO	1	0:00
	Yuriy Kochkine	def.	Milco Voorn	Submission (Kimura)	1	0:00
	Iouri Bekichev	def.	Hiromitsu Kanehara	TKO	1	0:00
	Maxim Novoselov	def.	Evert Fyeet	TKO	1	0:00
	Tsuyoshi Kosaka	def.	David Shvelidze	Submission (Armbar)	1	0:00
	Don Richards	def.	Konstantin Uriadov	Decision	2	0:00
	Mikhail Ilyukhin	def.	Petrov Kolev	Submission (Heel Hook)	1	0:00
	Egidijus Valavicius	def.	Andre Fyeet	Submission (Triangle Choke)	1	0:00

== Rings Ireland: Reborn ==
Rings Ireland: Reborn was an event held on October 15, 2005 in Ireland.

=== Results ===
Main Card
Weight class				Method	Round	Time	Notes
	Renato Migliaccio	def.	Emmanuel Fernandez	Decision	0	0:00
	Petras Markevicius	def.	Christophe Gauthierot	Submission	0	0:00
	Jerome Laulan	def.	Brandon Clifford	TKO (Cut)	0	0:00
	Greg Loughran	def.	Francis Heagney	Submission (Triangle Choke)	0	0:00
	Tom Haddock	def.	Adrian Degorski	Submission (Armbar)	0	0:00
	Arni Isaksson	def.	Aidan Marron	TKO	0	0:00
	Michael Leonard	def.	Neil Seery	Submission (Triangle Choke)	0	0:00
	Clive Staunton	def.	Alan Seery	Submission (Armbar)	0	0:00
	Owen Dempsey	def.	Tomas Murnikas	Decision	0	0:00
	Kevin McAlonan	def.	Andy O'Connor	TKO	0	0:00

== Rings Holland: Men of Honor ==
Rings Holland: Men of Honor was an event held on December 11, 2005 in Utrecht, Holland.

=== Results ===
Main Card
Weight class				Method	Round	Time	Notes
	Cheick Kongo	def.	Dave Dalgliesh	TKO (Punches)	2	N/A
	Nordin Bensellam	def.	Brian Maulany	Decision	2	5:00
	Raoul Dennen	vs.	Billy Echter	Draw	3	5:00
	Joop Kasteel	def.	Dan Severn	KO (Punches)	1	N/A
	Jan Overduin	def.	Peter Mes	Submission (Armbar)	1	N/A
	Aydogan Nuralis	def.	Dick Slagmolen	TKO (Punches)	1	N/A
	Dimitri Menger	def.	Ali Mazidi	TKO (Punches)	1	N/A
	Rody Trost	def.	Ashley Peiter	Submission (Armbar)	2	N/A

== See also ==
- Fighting Network Rings
- List of Fighting Network Rings events
