= Mario Borzic =

Mixed martial artist

- Division: Middleweight
- Years active: 1997–2004

Mixed martial arts record
- Total: 6
- Wins: 5
- By knockout: 4
- By decision: 1
- Losses: 1
- Unknown: 1

Other information
- Mixed martial arts record from Sherdog

Mario Borzic is a mixed martial artist. He competed in the Middleweight division.

== Mixed martial arts record ==
Professional record breakdown
6 matches	5 wins	1 loss
By knockout	4	0
By decision	1	0
Unknown	0	1

Res.	Record	Opponent	Method	Event	Date	Round	Time	Location	Notes
Win	5–1	Kamil Uygun	KO (knee)	Rings Holland: World's Greatest	April 4, 2004	1	2:43	Alytus, Alytus County, Lithuania	
Win	4–1	Kees Ameur	KO	MTBN: Immortality	November 2, 2003	1	0:00	Amsterdam, North Holland, Netherlands	
Win	3–1	Mujdat Deniz	TKO (knees and punches)	Rings Holland: The Untouchables	September 27, 2003	1	3:20	Utrecht, Netherlands	
Win	2–1	Fred van Doesburg	Decision (unanimous)	Rings Holland: Who's The Boss	June 7, 1998	2	5:00	Utrecht, Netherlands	
Loss	1–1	Tjerk Vermanen	DQ	FFH: Free Fight Gala	December 21, 1997	0	0:00	Beverwijk, North Holland, Netherlands	
Win	1–0	Michael Jonker	TKO (knee)	Rings Holland: Utrecht at War	June 29, 1997	1	0:00	Utrecht, Netherlands	

== See also ==
- List of male mixed martial artists
