= Naoyuki Kotani =

Japanese martial artist

Naoyuki Kotani 小谷直之
- Born: December 8, 1981 (age 44); Yokosuka, Japan
- Nationality: Japanese
- Height: 5 ft 8 in (1.73 m)
- Weight: 156 lb (71 kg; 11.1 st)
- Division: Lightweight
- Reach: 66.5
- Style: Judo, Shootboxing
- Team: Rodeo Style
- Years active: 2000-present

Mixed martial arts record
- Total: 62
- Wins: 37
- By knockout: 6
- By submission: 27
- By decision: 4
- Losses: 18
- By knockout: 9
- By submission: 2
- By decision: 7
- Draws: 7

Other information
- Mixed martial arts record from Sherdog

Naoyuki Kotani Japanese: 小谷直之 (born December 8, 1981) is a Japanese mixed martial artist currently competing in the Lightweight division. A professional competitor since 2000, he has formerly competed in PRIDE, Pancrase, UFC, Vale Tudo Japan, and RINGS.

== Mixed martial arts career ==
=== Early career ===
Kotani made his professional MMA debut in September 2000 for the RINGS promotion. He was unbeaten for the first three years of his career, earning a record of 13–0–2.

From 2004 to 2005, Kotani suffered a rough patch in his career as he went 3-5-1 against several UFC fighters including Roger Huerta, Yves Edwards, Marcus Aurélio and Rich Clementi.

=== Ultimate Fighting Championship ===
Kotani was signed by the UFC in 2007. In his debut, he faced Thiago Tavares at UFC Fight Night: Stevenson vs Guillard on April 5, 2007. He lost the fight via unanimous decision.

For his second fight with the promotion, Kotani faced Dennis Siver at UFC 75 on September 8, 2007. He lost the fight via knockout in the second round. Following this loss, Kotani was released by the promotion.

=== Post-UFC ===
Following his release, Kotani encountered another rough streak as he went 3-3-2 from November 2007 until April 2010. However, beginning in September 2010, Kotani started an undefeated streak of 13–0 over the next three and a half years in his native Japan.

=== UFC return ===
In May 2014, it was announced that Kotani had re-signed with the UFC. He made his return against Norman Parke on July 19, 2014, at UFC Fight Night 46. He lost the fight via TKO in the second round.

Kotani then faced Yan Cabral at UFC 179 on October 25, 2014. He lost the fight via submission in the second round.

Kotani next faced Kajan Johnson on September 27, 2015, at UFC Fight Night 75. He lost the fight by unanimous decision and was subsequently released from the promotion.

== Mixed martial arts record ==
Professional record breakdown
62 matches	37 wins	18 losses
By knockout	6	9
By submission	27	2
By decision	4	7
Draws	7	

Res.	Record	Opponent	Method	Event	Date	Round	Time	Location	Notes
Loss	37–18–7	Shin Haraguchi	TKO (elbows and punches)	Grachan 59 × Brave Fight 27	February 11, 2023	1	3:57	Tokyo, Japan	For the GRACHAN Lightweight Championship.
Win	37–17–7	Yutaka Ueda	Decision (unanimous)	Grachan 45	September 20, 2020	2	5:00	Tokyo, Japan	
Loss	36–17–7	Koshi Matsumoto	TKO (knee and punches)	Shooto 30th Anniversary Tour at Korakuen Hall	May 6, 2019	4	0:57	Tokyo, Japan	For the Shooto Lightweight Championship.
Win	36–16–7	Shutaro Debana	Submission (rear-naked choke)	Shooto 11/17	November 17, 2018	2	0:51	Tokyo, Japan	
Win	35–16–7	Akihito Mamiya	TKO (punches)	Grachan 35.5	July 16, 2018	1	2:33	Yokosuka, Kanagawa, Japan	
Loss	34–16–7	Marif Piraev	Decision (unanimous)	WCFA 44	December 17, 2017	3	5:00	Grozny, Chechnya, Russia	
Loss	34–15–7	Yuki Kawana	Decision (majority)	Shooto: Professional Shooto 10/15	October 15, 2017	3	5:00	Chiba, Japan	
Win	34–14–7	Yoichi Fukumoto	Submission (Armbar)	Shooto - Professional Shooto 4/23	April 23, 2017	1	2:10	Chiba, Japan	
Loss	33–14–7	Dmitriy Parubchenko	TKO (punches)	Real 5: Real Fight Championship 5	June 12, 2016	2	3:17	Tokyo, Japan	
Loss	33–13–7	Kajan Johnson	Decision (unanimous)	UFC Fight Night: Barnett vs. Nelson	September 27, 2015	3	5:00	Saitama, Japan	
Loss	33–12–7	Yan Cabral	Submission (rear-naked choke)	UFC 179	October 25, 2014	2	3:06	Rio de Janeiro, Brazil	
Loss	33–11–7	Norman Parke	TKO (punches)	UFC Fight Night: McGregor vs. Brandao	July 19, 2014	2	3:41	Dublin, Ireland	
Win	33–10–7	Yoshihiro Koyama	Decision (unanimous)	Vale Tudo Japan: VTJ 4th	February 23, 2014	3	5:00	Tokyo, Japan	
Win	32–10–7	Daisuke Hoshino	Submission (armbar)	Vale Tudo Japan: VTJ 3rd	October 5, 2013	1	3:57	Tokyo, Japan	
Win	31–10–7	Vitali Krat	Submission (armbar)	RINGS: The Outsider	June 9, 2013	1	2:47	Yokohama, Japan	
Win	30–10–7	Jung Min Kang	Submission (rear-naked choke)	ZST.35	April 7, 2013	1	2:45	Tokyo, Japan	
Win	29–10–7	Koji Mori	Submission (kneebar)	ZST.33: 10th Anniversary	November 23, 2012	1	1:40	Tokyo, Japan	
Win	28–10–7	Shinichi Taira	Decision (unanimous)	ZST.33: 10th Anniversary	November 23, 2012	2	5:00	Tokyo, Japan	
Win	27–10–7	Darius Minkevicius	Submission (kimura)	ZST.32	September 17, 2012	1	2:42	Tokyo, Japan	
Win	26–10–7	Ryuki Ueyama	TKO (punches)	RINGS: Reincarnation	March 9, 2012	1	2:32	Tokyo, Japan	
Win	25–10–7	Daisuke Hanazawa	TKO (punches)	Rings - Battle Genesis Vol. 9	January 22, 2012	2	4:03	Tokyo, Japan	
Win	24–10–7	Katsuya Inoue	Submission (armbar)	Pancrase: Impressive Tour 9	September 4, 2011	1	1:44	Tokyo, Japan	
Win	23–10–7	Ryo Asami	TKO (doctor stoppage)	RINGS: The Outsider 17	July 7, 2011	1	1:00	Tokyo, Japan	
Win	22–10–7	Keigo Hirayama	Submission (guillotine choke)	ZST.27	February 6, 2011	1	1:44	Tokyo, Japan	
Win	21–10–7	Eriya Matsuda	Submission (heel hook)	ZST.25	September 26, 2010	1	1:04	Tokyo, Japan	
Loss	20–10–7	Jorge Masvidal	Decision (split)	Astra	April 25, 2010	3	5:00	Tokyo, Japan	
Draw	20–9–7	Kenichi Ito	Draw	ZST.23	February 20, 2010	2	5:00	Tokyo, Japan	
Win	20–9–6	Daisuke Nakamura	Submission (leg scissor choke)	ZST.22	November 23, 2009	1	1:37	Tokyo, Japan	
Win	19–9–6	Yojiro Uchimura	Submission (achilles lock)	ZST.21	September 21, 2009	1	1:25	Tokyo, Japan	
Loss	18–9–6	Kuniyoshi Hironaka	Submission (reverse full-nelson)	ZST.20	May 24, 2009	2	2:43	Tokyo, Japan	
Win	18–8–6	Katsuhiko Nagata	Submission (heel hook)	ZST.18: Sixth Anniversary	November 23, 2008	2	4:38	Tokyo, Japan	
Loss	17–8–6	Koji Oishi	Decision (unanimous)	Pancrase: Shining 8	October 1, 2008	3	5:00	Tokyo, Japan	
Draw	17–7–6	Masanori Kanehara	Draw	ZST.15: Fifth Anniversary	November 23, 2007	2	5:00	Tokyo, Japan	
Loss	17–7–5	Dennis Siver	KO (punch)	UFC 75	September 8, 2007	2	2:04	London, England	
Loss	17–6–5	Thiago Tavares	Decision (unanimous)	UFC Fight Night: Stevenson vs. Guillard	April 5, 2007	3	5:00	Las Vegas, Nevada, United States	
Win	17–5–5	Masayuki Okude	Submission (armbar)	ZST.12	February 12, 2007	1	0:58	Tokyo, Japan	
Draw	16–5–5	Erikas Petraitis	Draw	ZST.11	November 23, 2006	2	5:00	Tokyo, Japan	
Win	16–5–4	Shinya Sato	Submission (armbar)	ZST: GT-F2	May 27, 2006	1	2:09	Tokyo, Japan	
Draw	15–5–4	Darius Skliaudys	Draw	ZST.9	February 18, 2006	2	5:00	Tokyo, Japan	
Win	15–5–3	Vito Woods	Submission (armbar)	Xtreme Fighting Organization 8	December 10, 2005	1	1:23	Illinois, United States	
Loss	14–5–3	Luiz Azeredo	KO (punch)	PRIDE Bushido 9	September 25, 2005	1	0:11	Tokyo, Japan	
Draw	14–4–3	Darius Skliaudys	Draw	ZST Grand Prix 2: Final Round	January 23, 2005	3	3:00	Tokyo, Japan	
Loss	14–4–2	Roger Huerta	TKO (punches)	Xtreme Fighting Organization 4	December 3, 2004	1	1:29	Illinois, United States	
Loss	14–3–2	Yves Edwards	TKO (head kick and punches)	Euphoria: Road to the Titles	October 15, 2004	1	3:10	New Jersey, United States	
Win	14–2–2	Hideo Tokoro	Submission (heel hook)	ZST.6	September 12, 2004	1	1:44	Tokyo, Japan	
Win	13–2–2	Remigijus Morkevicius	Submission (armbar)	ZST: Battle Hazard 1	July 4, 2004	1	2:07	Tokyo, Japan	
Loss	12–2–2	Marcus Aurélio	TKO (doctor stoppage)	ZST.5	May 5, 2004	2	3:34	Tokyo, Japan	
Loss	12–1–2	Rich Clementi	Decision (unanimous)	ZST Grand Prix: Final Round	January 11, 2004	2	5:00	Tokyo, Japan	
Win	12–0–2	Mindaugas Smirnovas	Submission (armbar)	ZST Grand Prix: Opening Round	November 23, 2003	1	0:41	Tokyo, Japan	
Win	11–0–2	Mindaugas Smirnovas	Technical Submission (heel hook)	ZST 4: The Battle Field 4	September 7, 2003	1	1:36	Tokyo, Japan	
Draw	10–0–2	Mindaugas Smirnovas	Draw	RINGS Lithuania: Bushido RINGS 7: Adrenalinas	April 5, 2003	3	3:00	Vilnius, Lithuania	
Win	10–0–1	Antoine Skinner	Submission (toe hold)	ZST 2: The Battle Field 2	March 9, 2003	1	1:35	Tokyo, Japan	
Win	9–0–1	Mindaugas Laurinaitis	Technical Submission (triangle choke)	ZST 1: The Battle Field 1	November 23, 2002	1	2:16	Tokyo, Japan	
Win	8–0–1	Kenichi Serizawa	TKO (punches)	GCM: Demolition 1	September 8, 2002	1	0:20	Japan	
Win	7–0–1	Masaya Takita	Submission (triangle armbar)	GCM: ORG 3rd	June 16, 2002	1	2:32	Tokyo, Japan	
Win	6–0–1	Yoshinobu Ota	Technical Submission (rear-naked choke)	RINGS: World Title Series Grand Final	February 15, 2002	1	1:41	Yokohama, Japan	
Win	5–0–1	Takahito Iida	Submission (armbar)	RINGS: World Title Series 5	December 21, 2001	1	3:02	Yokohama, Japan	
Win	4–0–1	Hideo Tokoro	Decision (majority)	RINGS: Battle Genesis Vol. 8	September 21, 2001	3	5:00	Tokyo, Japan	
Draw	3–0–1	Jiro Wakabayashi	Draw	RINGS: World Title Series 1	April 20, 2001	3	5:00	Tokyo, Japan	
Win	3–0	Curtis Brigham	Submission (kimura)	RINGS USA: Battle of Champions	March 17, 2001	2	1:59	Iowa, United States	
Win	2–0	Tashiro Nishiuchi	Submission (armbar)	RINGS: Battle Genesis Vol. 6	September 5, 2000	1	0:32	Tokyo, Japan	
Win	1–0	Kiyohito Sugata	TKO (doctor stoppage)	RINGS: Battle Genesis Vol. 6	September 5, 2000	1	0:42	Tokyo, Japan	

== See also ==
- List of male mixed martial artists
