= Sander Thonhauser =

Dutch mixed martial arts fighter

- Nationality: Dutch
- Height: 6 ft 2 in (1.88 m)
- Division: Heavyweight
- Team: Nijman/Halderen
- Years active: 1997-2005

Mixed martial arts record
- Total: 21
- Wins: 11
- By knockout: 7
- By submission: 2
- By decision: 2
- Losses: 9
- By knockout: 4
- By submission: 4
- By disqualification: 1
- No contests: 1

Other information
- Mixed martial arts record from Sherdog

Sander Thonhauser is a Dutch professional mixed martial artist. He competes in the Heavyweight division. He is a RINGS Holland veteran and has also fought for many other top promotions. His Mixed martial arts debut was on June 29, 1997. Sander has not fought since 2005, where he lost to Murad Chunkaiev by submission on April 3, 2005.

== Mixed martial arts record ==
Professional record breakdown
21 matches	11 wins	9 losses
By knockout	7	4
By submission	2	4
By decision	2	0
By disqualification	0	1
No contests	1	

Res.	Record	Opponent	Method	Event	Date	Round	Time	Location	Notes
Loss	11–9 (1)	Murad Chunkaiev	Submission (armbar)	Rings Holland: Armed and Dangerous	April 3, 2005	1	2:01	Utrecht City, Netherlands	
Win	11–8 (1)	Raoulet Salim	KO (knee and punches)	Rings Holland: Born Invincible	December 12, 2004	2	1:29	Utrecht City, Netherlands	
Win	10–8 (1)	Michael Knaap	KO (punch)	Rings Holland: World's Greatest	April 4, 2004	2	4:45	Utrecht City, Netherlands	
Loss	9–8 (1)	Ibragim Magomedov	KO (punches)	2H2H: 2 Hot 2 Handle	February 22, 2004	1	3:32	Amsterdam, Netherlands	
Win	9–7 (1)	Ladislav Zak	Submission (guillotine choke)	2H2H: 2 Hot 2 Handle	February 22, 2004	1	0:43	Amsterdam, Netherlands	
Win	8–7 (1)	Olaf in 't Veld	KO (punch)	2H2H: 2 Hot 2 Handle	February 22, 2004	1	0:09	Amsterdam, Netherlands	
Win	7–7 (1)	Ladislav Zak	Decision	Gym Alkmaar: Fight Gala	January 25, 2004	0	0:00	Netherlands	
Loss	6–7 (1)	Andrey Rudakov	Submission (leglock)	DF: Durata World Grand Prix 3	December 12, 2003	1	0:00	Zagreb, Croatia	
Loss	6–6 (1)	Marc Emmanuel	Submission (keylock)	Rings Holland: No Guts, No Glory	June 10, 2001	2	0:36	Amsterdam, Netherlands	
Win	6–5 (1)	Colin Sexton	TKO (cut)	FFH: Free Fight Explosion 1	May 27, 2001	0	0:00	Beverwijk, Netherlands	
NC	5–5 (1)	Lee Hasdell	No Contest	Rings Holland: Heroes Live Forever	January 28, 2001	1	0:00	Utrecht, Netherlands	
Loss	5–5	Kavkaz Sultanmagomedov	TKO (punches)	WVC 8: World Vale Tudo Championship 8	July 1, 1999	1	2:47	Aruba	
Loss	5–4	Zaza Tkeshelashvili	TKO (5 lost points)	Rings: Rise 2nd	April 23, 1999	1	4:02	Japan	
Win	5–3	Joe Akano	TKO (punches)	Rings Holland: Judgement Day	February 7, 1999	2	0:00	Amsterdam, Netherlands	
Win	4–3	Artur Mariano	TKO	FFH: Free Fight Gala	January 9, 1999	0	0:00	Beverwijk, Netherlands	
Win	3–3	Scott Goddard	Decision (split)	Rings Holland: The Thialf Explosion	October 24, 1998	2	5:00	Heerenveen, Netherlands	
Loss	2–3	Ruslan Kerselyan	TKO	M-1 MFC: European Championship 1998	April 10, 1998	1	0:00	St. Petersburg, Russia	
Loss	2–2	Lee Hasdell	Submission (arm-triangle choke)	NOTS 1: Night of the Samurai 1	March 7, 1998	1	0:55	Milton Keynes, England	For the Vacant TFF Vale Tudo Superfight title.
Win	2–1	Cees Bezems	Submission (scarf hold armlock)	Rings Holland: The King of Rings	February 8, 1998	1	0:58	Amsterdam, Netherlands	
Loss	1–1	Vidal Serradilla	DQ	FFH: Free Fight Gala	December 21, 1997	0	0:00	Beverwijk, Netherlands	
Win	1–0	Gerard Benschop	KO (palm strikes)	Rings Holland: Utrecht at War	June 29, 1997	1	3:04	Utrecht, Netherlands	
