= Differ Ariake =

Arena in Tokyo

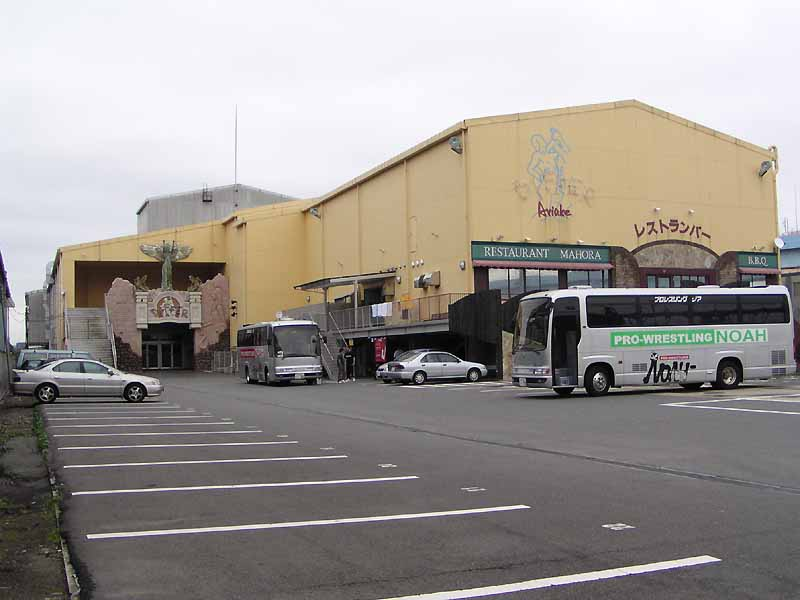
- Interactive map of Differ Ariake
- Former names: MZA Ariake (1988–1991)
- Address: 1-3-25 Ariake, Kōtō, Tokyo; Tokyo; Japan
- Coordinates: 35°38′19.44″N 139°47′21.22″E
- Operator: Differ Ariake Co., Ltd.
- Capacity: 1,273

Construction
- Opened: July 21, 1988; 38 years ago (MZA Ariake) July 1, 2000; 26 years ago (Differ Ariake)
- Closed: 1991 (MZA Ariake), June 30, 2018 (Differ Ariake)

Website
- Official website

Differ Ariake (ディファ有明, Difa Ariake), originally MZA Ariake, was an indoor sporting arena located in the Ariake neighborhood of Tokyo, Japan. It was open from July 1988 until closing sometime 1991. It later reopened in 1999 as Differ Ariake.

Differ Ariake closed in June 2018 and it was replaced by the newly built Ariake Arena for the 2020 Summer Olympics and the 2020 Summer Paralympics.

The capacity of the arena was 1,246 seats. It was mainly used for professional wrestling and martial arts events. The arena became known as the home of Pro Wrestling Noah, housing the promotion's offices and training dojo.

The arena may be reached on a short walk from either Ariake Tennis no Mori Station on the New Transit Yurikamome or Kokusai-Tenjijō Station on the Rinkai Line.

Events and tenants
Preceded by Trump Taj Mahal	Ultimate Fighting Championship venue UFC 29	Succeeded by Trump Taj Mahal
