= List of Fighting Network Rings events =

This is a list of events promoted under the Fighting Network Rings brand and recorded in the Sherdog event database.

== Events ==
Event data are from Sherdog's RINGS event record.
Event	Date	Location
Rings - The Outsider 55: Awakening Kyushu Tournament, Again	May 22, 2022	Munakata Yurikkusu, Munakata, Fukuoka, Japan
Rings - The Outsider 53: First Tohoku Tournament	November 4, 2019	Shirakawa Gymnasium, Shirakawa, Japan
Rings - The Outsider 54: Awakening Kyushu Tournament	October 27, 2019	Munakata Yurikkusu, Munakata, Fukuoka, Japan
Rings - The Outsider 52	September 2, 2018	Munakata Yurikkusu, Munakata, Fukuoka, Japan
Rings - The Outsider 51: 10th Anniversary Road to Las Vegas	July 21, 2018	Kawasaki City Todoroki Arena, Kawasaki, Japan
Rings - The Outsider Experiment League	April 28, 2018	Shinjuku Face, Shinjuku, Tokyo, Japan
Rings - The Outsider 50: Ariake Final	March 11, 2018	Differ Ariake, Tokyo, Japan
Rings - The Outsider 49	February 25, 2018	Munakata Yurikkusu, Munakata, Fukuoka, Japan
Rings - The Outsider 48: Ota City General Gymnasium Special	December 10, 2017	Ota City General Gymnasium, Ota, Tokyo, Japan
Rings - The Outsider 47	July 30, 2017	Differ Ariake, Tokyo, Japan
Rings - The Outsider 46	May 21, 2017	Differ Ariake, Tokyo, Japan
Rings - The Outsider 45	February 19, 2017	Differ Ariake, Tokyo, Japan
Rings - The Outsider 44	December 18, 2016	Munakata Yurikkusu, Munakata, Fukuoka, Japan
Rings - The Outsider 43: Special	December 11, 2016	Yokohama Cultural Gymnasium, Yokohama, Kanagawa, Japan
Rings - The Outsider 42	September 4, 2016	Toyokawa Gymnasium, Toyokawa, Aichi, Japan
Rings - The Outsider 41	July 31, 2016	Differ Ariake, Tokyo, Japan
Rings - The Outsider 40	May 29, 2016	Differ Ariake, Tokyo, Japan
Rings - The Outsider 39	March 27, 2016	Differ Ariake, Tokyo, Japan
Rings - The Outsider 38: Ota City General Gymnasium Special	December 13, 2015	Ota City General Gymnasium, Ota, Tokyo, Japan
Rings - The Outsider 37	September 6, 2015	Kiramesse Numazu, Numazu, Shizuoka, Japan
Rings - The Outsider 36	July 19, 2015	Differ Ariake, Tokyo, Japan
Rings - The Outsider 35	May 17, 2015	Differ Ariake, Tokyo, Japan
Rings - The Outsider 34	March 21, 2015	Differ Ariake, Tokyo, Japan
Rings - The Outsider 33	December 7, 2014	Yokohama Cultural Gymnasium, Yokohama, Kanagawa, Japan
Rings - The Outsider 32	September 7, 2014	Namihaya Dome, Kadoma, Osaka, Japan
Rings - The Outsider 31	June 22, 2014	Differ Ariake, Tokyo, Japan
Rings - The Outsider 30	April 6, 2014	Differ Ariake, Tokyo, Japan
Rings - The Outsider 29	February 16, 2014	Differ Ariake, Tokyo, Japan
Rings - The Outsider 28	December 8, 2013	Osaka Prefectural Kadoma Sports Center Sub-Arena, Kadoma, Osaka, Japan
Rings - The Outsider 27	September 8, 2013	Osaka Municipal Central Gymnasium, Osaka, Japan
Rings - The Outsider 26	June 9, 2013	Yokohama Cultural Gymnasium, Yokohama, Kanagawa, Japan
Rings - The Outsider 25	April 21, 2013	Differ Ariake, Tokyo, Japan
Rings - The Outsider 24	February 10, 2013	Differ Ariake, Tokyo, Japan
Rings - The Outsider 23: Volk Han Retirement Match	December 16, 2012	Yokohama Cultural Gymnasium, Yokohama, Kanagawa, Japan
Rings - Vol. 2: Conquisito	September 23, 2012	Korakuen Hall, Tokyo, Japan
Rings - The Outsider 22	July 15, 2012	Differ Ariake, Tokyo, Japan
Rings - Battle Genesis Vol. 10	May 27, 2012	Differ Ariake, Tokyo, Japan
Rings - The Outsider 21	May 13, 2012	Differ Ariake, Tokyo, Japan
Rings - Reincarnation	March 9, 2012	Korakuen Hall, Tokyo, Japan
Rings - The Outsider 20	February 12, 2012	Differ Ariake, Tokyo, Japan
Rings - Battle Genesis Vol. 9	January 22, 2012	Shinjuku Face, Tokyo, Japan
Rings - The Outsider 19	November 13, 2011	Yokohama Cultural Gymnasium, Yokohama, Kanagawa, Japan
Rings - The Outsider 18	August 14, 2011	Differ Ariake, Tokyo, Japan
Rings - The Outsider 17	July 17, 2011	Differ Ariake, Tokyo, Japan
Rings - The Outsider 16	May 8, 2011	Yokohama Cultural Gymnasium, Yokohama, Kanagawa, Japan
Rings - The Outsider 15	February 13, 2011	Differ Ariake, Tokyo, Japan
Rings - The Outsider 14	December 4, 2010	Differ Ariake, Tokyo, Japan
Rings - The Outsider 13	October 11, 2010	Yokohama Cultural Gymnasium, Yokohama, Kanagawa, Japan
Rings - The Outsider 12	June 20, 2010	Differ Ariake, Tokyo, Japan
Rings - The Outsider 11	April 3, 2010	Differ Ariake, Tokyo, Japan
Rings - The Outsider 10	February 14, 2010	Differ Ariake, Tokyo, Japan
Rings - The Outsider 9	December 13, 2009	Differ Ariake, Tokyo, Japan
Rings - The Outsider 8	October 11, 2009	Differ Ariake, Tokyo, Japan
Rings - The Outsider 7	August 9, 2009	Differ Ariake, Tokyo, Japan
Rings - The Outsider 6	May 5, 2009	Differ Ariake, Tokyo, Japan
Rings - The Outsider 5	March 15, 2009	Ryogoku Kokugikan, Tokyo, Japan
Rings - The Outsider 4	December 20, 2008	Differ Ariake, Tokyo, Japan
Rings - The Outsider 3	October 19, 2008	Differ Ariake, Tokyo, Japan
Rings - The Outsider 2	July 19, 2008	Differ Ariake, Tokyo, Japan
Rings - The Outsider	March 30, 2008	Differ Ariake, Tokyo, Japan
Rings Gala - Risky Business	September 23, 2007	Netherlands
Rings Lithuania - Lekeciai 500	August 13, 2006	Lekeciai, Marijampole County, Lithuania
Rings - Road to Japan	March 26, 2006	Holland
Rings Ireland - Reborn	October 15, 2005	Ireland
Rings Russia - CIS vs. The World	August 20, 2005	Rings Sports Centrum, Yekaterinburg, Sverdlovsk Oblast, Russia
Rings - Bushido Ireland	March 12, 2005	Ireland
Rings Lithuania - Rampage 2	August 3, 2003	Kupeta Bar Palanga, Lithuania
Rings Lithuania - Explosion	May 10, 2003	Night Club "COMBO"Kaunas, Lithuania
Rings Lithuania - Bushido Rings 7: Adrenalinas	April 5, 2003	Vilnius, Lithuania
Rings Lithuania - Ronin	January 31, 2003	Alytus Sports Hall, Alytus, Alytus County, Lithuania
Rings Lithuania - Bushido Rings 6: Dynamite	December 14, 2002	Kaunas, Lithuania
Rings Lithuania - Bushido Rings 5: Shock	November 9, 2002	Vilnius Sport Hall Vilnius, Lithuania
Rings Lithuania - Rampage	August 2, 2002	Palanga Beach Palanga, Lithuania
Rings Lithuania - Bushido Rings 4	May 4, 2002	Kaunas Sport Hall Kaunas, Lithuania
Rings - World Title Series Grand Final	February 15, 2002	Yokohama Cultural Gymnasium, Kanagawa, Japan
Rings - World Title Series 5	December 21, 2001	Yokohama Cultural Gymnasium, Kanagawa, Japan
Rings Lithuania - Bushido Rings 3	November 10, 2001	Vilnius Concerts and Sports Hall Vilnius, Lithuania
Rings - World Title Series 4	October 20, 2001	Yoyogi National Stadium Gym 2, Tokyo, Japan
Rings - Battle Genesis Vol. 8	September 21, 2001	Korakuen Hall. Tokyo, Japan
Rings - 10th Anniversary	August 11, 2001	Ariake Coliseum in Tokyo, Japan
Rings - World Title Series 2	June 15, 2001	Yokohama Cultural Gymnasium in Kanagawa, Japan
Rings Lithuania - Bushido Rings 2	May 8, 2001	Vilnius Concerts and Sports Hall Vilnius, Lithuania
Rings - World Title Series 1	April 20, 2001	Yoyogi National Stadium Gym 2 in Tokyo, Japan
Rings Russia - Russia vs. Bulgaria	April 6, 2001	Ekaterinburg Sports Palace, Ekaterinburg, Russia
Rings - Battle Genesis Vol. 7	March 20, 2001	Differ Ariake in Tokyo, Japan
Rings USA - Battle of Champions	March 17, 2001	Harveys Casino Hotel, Council Bluffs, Iowa
Rings - King of Kings 2000 Final	February 24, 2001	Ryogoku Kokugikan Sumo Arena in Tokyo, Japan
Rings - King of Kings 2000 Block B	December 22, 2000	Osaka Prefecture Gymnasium in Osaka, Japan
Rings Australia - Free Fight Battle	November 12, 2000	Alexandra Hills Hotel, Brisbane, Australia
Rings Lithuania - Bushido Rings 1	October 24, 2000	Vilnius Concerts and Sports Hall Vilnius, Lithuania
Rings - King of Kings 2000 Block A	October 9, 2000	Yoyogi National Stadium Gym 2 in Tokyo, Japan
Rings USA - Rising Stars Final	September 30, 2000	The Mark of the Quad Cities in Moline, Illinois
Rings - Battle Genesis Vol. 6	September 5, 2000	Korakuen Hall in Tokyo, Japan
Rings - Millennium Combine 3	August 23, 2000	Osaka Prefecture Gymnasium in Osaka, Japan
Rings - Russia vs. Georgia	August 16, 2000	Tula CircusTula, Russia
Rings USA - Rising Stars Block B	July 22, 2000	Blaisdell Arena in Honolulu, Hawaii
Rings USA - Rising Stars Block A	July 15, 2000	McKay Center in Orem, Utah
Rings - Millennium Combine 2	June 15, 2000	Yoyogi National Stadium Gym 2 in Tokyo, Japan
Rings Russia - Russia vs. Bulgaria	May 21, 2000	Tula, Russia
Rings Russia - Russia vs. The World	May 20, 2000	Yekaterinburg Sports Palace, Yekaterinburg, Sverdlovsk Oblast, Russia
Rings - Millennium Combine 1	April 20, 2000	Yoyogi National Stadium Gym 2 in Tokyo, Japan
Rings Australia - NR 4	March 19, 2000	Alexandra Hills Hotel, Brisbane, Queensland, Australia
Rings - King of Kings 1999 Final	February 26, 2000	Nippon-Budokan in Tokyo, Japan
Rings - King of Kings 1999 Block B	December 22, 1999	Osaka Perfecture Gymnasium in Osaka, Japan
Rings - King of Kings 1999 Block A	October 28, 1999	Yoyogi National Stadium Gym 2 in Tokyo, Japan
Rings - Rings Georgia	October 8, 1999	Georgia
Rings - Rise 5th	August 19, 1999	Japan
Rings - Rise 4th	June 24, 1999	Japan
Rings - Rise 3rd	May 22, 1999	Japan
Rings - Rise 2nd	April 23, 1999	Japan
Rings - Rise 1st	March 20, 1999	Japan
Rings Australia - NR 3	March 7, 1999	Alexandra Hills Hotel, Brisbane, Queensland, Australia
Rings - Final Capture	February 21, 1999	Japan
Rings - World Mega Battle Tournament	December 23, 1998	Japan
Rings Australia - NR2	September 13, 1998	Australia
Rings - Fourth Fighting Integration	June 27, 1998	Tokyo, Japan
Rings - Third Fighting Integration	May 29, 1998	Tokyo, Japan
Rings Russia - Russia vs. Holland	April 25, 1998	Ekaterinburg, Russia
Rings - Battle Dimensions Tournament 1997 Final	January 21, 1998	
Rings - Mega Battle Tournament 1997 Semifinal	December 23, 1997	Japan
Rings - Mega Battle Tournament 1997 Semifinal 1	October 25, 1997	Japan
Rings - Extension Fighting 7	September 26, 1997	Japan
Rings - Extension Fighting 4	June 21, 1997	Ariake Coliseum, Tokyo, Japan
Rings - Extension Fighting 2	April 22, 1997	Japan
Rings - Budokan Hall 1997	January 22, 1997	Budokan HallTokyo, Japan
Rings - Battle Dimensions Tournament 1996 Final	January 1, 1997	
Rings - Battle Dimensions Tournament 1996 Opening Round	October 25, 1996	
Rings - Maelstrom 6	August 24, 1996	Japan
Rings - Budokan Hall 1996	January 24, 1996	Budokan HallTokyo, Japan
Rings - Battle Dimensions Tournament 1995 Opening Round	October 21, 1995	
Rings - Budokan Hall 1995	January 25, 1995	Budokan HallTokyo, Japan

== See also ==
- Fighting Network Rings
