= Andy Uhrich =

American mixed martial arts fighter

- Born: United States
- Other names: Stunner
- Nationality: American
- Height: 6 ft 0 in (1.83 m)
- Weight: 169.8 lb (77.0 kg; 12.13 st)
- Division: Middleweight; Welterweight; Lightweight
- Reach: 70.0
- Fighting out of: Memphis, Tennessee, United States
- Years active: 2007 - current

Mixed martial arts record
- Total: 17
- Wins: 11
- By knockout: 4
- By submission: 2
- By decision: 5
- Losses: 6
- By knockout: 3
- By submission: 2
- By decision: 1

Other information
- Mixed martial arts record from Sherdog

Andy Uhrich is an American mixed martial artist who most recently competed in the Welterweight division of Bellator MMA. A professional competitor since 2007, he also competed for Strikeforce, Titan FC, and was a contestant on Fight Master: Bellator MMA.

== Mixed martial arts record ==
Professional record breakdown
17 matches	11 wins	6 losses
By knockout	4	3
By submission	2	2
By decision	5	1

Res.	Record	Opponent	Method	Event	Date	Round	Time	Location	Notes
Loss	11-6	Paul Daley	KO (punch)	Bellator 148	January 29, 2016	1	2:00	Fresno, California, United States	Welterweight bout.
Win	11-5	Bobby Cooper	Decision (split)	TFC 33: Titan Fighting Championship 33	March 20, 2015	3	5:00	Mobile, Alabama, United States	
Win	10-5	Marcus Andrusia	Decision (unanimous)	SFC: Summit Fighting Championships 10	February 21, 2015	3	5:00	Vicksburg, Mississippi, United States	Middleweight debut.
Win	9-5	Codale Ford	Decision (unanimous)	SFC: Summit Fighting Championships 7	September 13, 2014	3	5:00	Vicksburg, Mississippi, United States	Lightweight debut.
Loss	8-5	Ben Brewer	KO (punches)	Bellator 120	May 17, 2014	2	2:40	Southaven, Mississippi, United States	
Loss	8-4	Nathan Coy	Decision (unanimous)	Bellator 101	September 27, 2013	3	5:00	Portland, Oregon, United States	
Win	8-3	Joe Williams	Decision (unanimous)	Bellator 73	August 24, 2012	3	5:00	Tunica, Mississippi, United States	
Win	7-3	Joshua Thorpe	Submission (rear-naked choke)	Prize Fight Promotions: Mid South MMA Championships 6	May 19, 2012	3	4:27	Southaven, Mississippi, United States	
Loss	6-3	Charlie Rader	KO (punches)	Empire FC: A Night of Reckoning 4	October 9, 2010	2	2:06	Tunica, Mississippi, United States	
Win	6-2	Dustin West	Submission (rear-naked choke)	Strikeforce: Nashville	April 17, 2010	1	1:36	Nashville, Tennessee, United States	
Win	5-2	Salvador Woods	TKO (punches)	CA: Cage Assault	March 6, 2010	2	1:46	Memphis, Tennessee, United States	
Win	4-2	Brandon Barger	Decision (unanimous)	HTF: Harrah's Tunica Fights	October 23, 2009	3	5:00	Robinsonville, Mississippi, United States	
Loss	3-2	Jake Hecht	Submission (triangle choke)	CA: Battlegrounds	August 22, 2009	2	2:02	Millington, Tennessee, United States	
Win	3-1	Brian White	TKO (punches)	Cage Assault: Bragging Rights	April 24, 2009	1	4:03	Memphis, Tennessee, United States	
Win	2-1	Mike Knight	KO (punch)	ECL: Brawl For A Cause	November 1, 2008	1	2:17	Bixby, Oklahoma, United States	
Win	1-1	Don Johnson	TKO (punches)	SF: Subzero Fighting	January 12, 2008	3	N/A	Little Rock, Arkansas, United States	
Loss	0-1	Chris Gates	Submission (triangle choke)	AOW: Art of War 4	October 27, 2007	1	3:34	Tunica, Mississippi, United States	

== See also ==
- List of male mixed martial artists
