= Sam Oropeza =

American mixed martial arts fighter

- Born: June 17, 1985 (age 41); Briarcliffe, Pennsylvania, United States
- Other names: Sammy O
- Nationality: American
- Height: 6 ft 2 in (1.88 m)
- Weight: 185 lb (84 kg; 13.2 st)
- Division: Welterweight (170 lb); Middleweight (185 lb)Cruiserweight (199 lb)
- Reach: 72.5 in (184 cm)
- Stance: Southpaw
- Fighting out of: Briarcliffe, Pennsylvania, United States
- Team: Philadelphia Fight Factory, Team Balance
- Rank: brown belt in Brazilian jiu-jitsu
- Years active: 2008–2017

Mixed martial arts record
- Total: 16
- Wins: 13
- By knockout: 8
- By submission: 5
- Losses: 3
- By submission: 2
- By decision: 1

Amateur record
- Total: 2
- Wins: 2
- By knockout: 1
- By submission: 1

Other information
- Notable school: Monsignor Bonner High School
- Mixed martial arts record from Sherdog

Sam Oropeza (born June 17, 1985) is a American former mixed martial artist, coach, manager, boxer, and political candidate who most notably competed in Bellator's middleweight and welterweight divisions. Oropeza had 16 professional MMA fights, racking up a 13–3 record. Oropeza competed professionally as a boxer, where he competed as a cruiserweight and was undefeated in two fights. In 2025, Oropeza returned to the ring in a sanctioned exhibition bout to become the XRumble United States Champion.

== Background ==
Oropeza was born in Briarcliffe, Pennsylvania, as the youngest of six children. At the age of 10, Oropeza lost his father to liver failure. During his youth, Oropeza wrestled at Monsignor Bonner High School. In 2006, he started to practice Brazilian jiu-jitsu and in 2008, he earned a purple belt. In the same year, he fought as an amateur in mixed martial arts for the first time.

== Mixed martial arts career ==
=== King of the Cage and Strikeforce ===
Oropeza rattled off 2 amateur finishes for New Breed Fighters in late 2008, before turning pro in 2009. He made his professional debut on June 6, 2009, against Mitch Filer at World Cage Fighting Alliance in Atlantic City, New Jersey and defeated him via rear naked choke in the first round. From 2009 to 2010, he was victorious against Dustin Collins via submission, Dave Concepcion via head kick knockout, and Koa Ramos via guillotine choke at KOTC: Honor Oropeza's first defeat was against fellow undefeated prospect Myles Jury at KOTC: No Mercy. He bounced back on the biggest stage of his career up to that point by submitting Don Carlo-Clauss in front of 11,287 fans at Strikeforce: Fedor vs. Silva.

=== TV appearances ===
In 2010, Oropeza was selected to do a taping for the MTV show Bully Beatdown. The premise of this show was to put 'real life bullies' in the cage to fight professional MMA fighters. If the bully is defeated, the bully's victims can receive up to $10,000. If the bully defeats the fighter, he earns $10,000. The episode aired on MTV2 in 2012 and was titled "David: Tears of A Clown". Oropeza made the bully tap out 5 times in round 1 and stopped the fight with a TKO in round 2, earning the bully's victims $10,000.

Oropeza also appeared on Kevin Smith's show, Comic Book Men, on AMC. Oropeza was seen portraying Jay from the Jay and Silent Bob duo in a staged fight between the 2 cult heroes.

=== Bellator Fighting Championships, Matrix Fights and Xtreme Fight Events ===
Holding a 5–1 record, Oropeza made his Bellator debut against Giedrius Karavackas on May 14, 2011, at Bellator 44. The fight was televised live nationally on MTV2. He was defeated via submission due to a scarf hold armlock in the third round.

After an extended break from competition, Oropeza returned to face Aung La Nsang on March 16, 2012, at Matrix Fights 5. He won via submission due to a triangle choke in the second round.

Oropeza faced Richard Rigmaden on October 13, 2012, at XFE: Cage Wars 18. He won via submission due to an armbar early in the first round.

In February 2013, it was announced that Oropeza signed a long-term contract with Bellator.

=== Bellator return ===
Oropeza returned to the Bellator cage to face Shedrick Goodridge on April 4, 2013, at Bellator 95. He won via TKO in the second round. It was later revealed Oropeza defeated his opponent, despite having suffered a broken tibia in the round.

On September 20, 2013, at Matrix Fights 8, in front of a hometown crowd in South Philadelphia, Pennsylvania, Oropeza defeated Brett Oteri via TKO in the first round.

Oropeza faced Chip Moraza-Pollard on November 15, 2013, at Bellator 108. He won via TKO early in round one.

Oropeza was expected to face Fight Master winner Joe Riggs in the quarterfinal match of Bellator season ten welterweight tournament on March 14, 2014, at Bellator 112. Riggs, however, pulled out of the bout and was replaced by Cristiano Souza. The fight was televised live nationally on Spike TV. Oropeza won the fight via TKO in the first round.

==== Move to Middleweight ====
Oropeza was unable to make weight for the rescheduled semi-final bout of the Bellator Season 10 Welterweight Tournament against Andrey Koreshkov. It is expected he will be making a move up in weight after difficulties with weight cutting. Bellator CEO Bjorn Rebney stated "he got within 1.7 pound this time but then he just said I'm done. I am going to end up going to the hospital. I am finished but last time he was seven or eight over. Last time he was clearly missing and this time he could have conceptually made it, but you get to that point where you say stop because you are going to end up in the hospital and he did. One seventy is just to small for him."

Oropeza made his middleweight return against Gary Tapusoa on October 24, 2014, at Bellator 130. He won the fight via TKO in the first round.

=== Global Proving Ground ===
After 4 straight first-round TKO wins, 3 under the Bellator banner, Oropeza asked for and was granted his release from Bellator MMA. Oropeza was very open about his desire to fight in the UFC and hoped to sign a contract with the UFC before the end of 2015. Oropeza fought on January 17, 2015, for Global Proving Ground and defeated Timothy Woods in the first round in the main event at Global Proving Ground 17. His victory was changed to a no contest.

=== Caged Fury Fighting Championships ===
Oropeza next signed a multi-fight deal with Caged Fury Fighting Championships a contract which included a UFC clause allowing him to leave CFFC if the UFC offers him a fight. Oropeza was scheduled to fight Levon Maynard at CFFC 52 on October 31, 2015 at the Borgata Casino Hotel, in Atlantic City, New Jersey. The fight was a 175lb Catchweight fight. Maynard defeated Oropeza by unanimous decision.

=== Hiatus from MMA and potential return ===
After his first ever loss by decision, Oropeza announced he was taking time off from professional MMA for personal reasons. He then transitioned from mixed martial arts to professional boxing.

Oropeza officially announced he would return to the cage on May 18, 2018, at Art Of War 7 at the 2300 Arena in south Philadelphia, Pennsylvania. It was announced that Oropeza would be the main event and face Nick Wagner in a 185lb Middeweight bout. Wagner pulled out of the fight for undisclosed reasons. Sharif Jones stepped in on short notice. This fight was cancelled due to Jones' medical work not being submitted by the deadline.

== Boxing career ==
Sam Oropeza
Personal information
- Nickname: Sammy O
- Height: 6 ft 2 in (188 cm)
- Weight: Cruiserweight

Boxing career
- Reach: 73 in (185 cm)
- Stance: Southpaw

Boxing record
- Total fights: 2
- Wins: 2
- Win by KO: 1
- Losses: 0

Oropeza is 2–0 as a professional boxer. He made his return to professional combat sports on March 11, 2017, after a lengthy hiatus and knocked out his opponent Joe Parkinson (0-1) in 35 seconds. The fight took place at the Sugar House casino in Philadelphia, Pennsylvania for King's Promotions.

Oropeza returned to the squared circle on May 12, 2017, once again for King's Promotions. He faced Kyle Mcnutt in a cruiserweight tilt. Oropeza scored knockdowns in the 1st and 4th rounds on his way to a unanimous decision victory.

Oropeza defeated professional wrestler James "All Day Advocate" Gray for the XRumble Celebrity Boxing United States Light Heavyweight Championship on June 14, 2025 at Harrahs Casino near Philadelphia.

== Political career ==
Oropeza was nominated by the Republican Party for a special election to the Pennsylvania Senate's 5th district in 2022. He was defeated in the special election by Jimmy Dillon.

Oropeza was a candidate for a at-large seat on Philadelphia City Council in 2023. He was eliminalinated in the Republican primary.

== Mixed martial arts record ==
Professional record breakdown
16 matches	13 wins	3 losses
By knockout	8	0
By submission	5	2
By decision	0	1
No contests	0	

Res.	Record	Opponent	Method	Event	Date	Round	Time	Location	Notes
Loss	13–3	Levon Maynard	Decision (Unanimous)	CFFC 52	October 31, 2015	3	5:00	Atlantic City, New Jersey, United States	Catchweight (175 lb) bout.
Win	13–2	Timothy Woods	KO (Slam)	Global Proving Ground	January 17, 2015	1	0:51	Pennsauken, New Jersey, United States	
Win	12–2	Gary Tapusoa	TKO (punches)	Bellator 130	October 24, 2014	1	2:31	Mulvane, Kansas, United States	
Win	11–2	Cristiano Souza	TKO (punches)	Bellator 112	March 14, 2014	1	3:07	Hammond, Indiana	Bellator Season Ten Welterweight Tournament Quarterfinal.
Win	10–2	Chip Moraza-Pollard	TKO (punches)	Bellator 108	November 15, 2013	1	0:37	Atlantic City, New Jersey, United States	Catchweight (174 lb) bout; Oropeza missed weight.
Win	9–2	Brett Oteri	TKO (punches)	Matrix Fights 8	September 20, 2013	1	3:32	Philadelphia, Pennsylvania, United States	Middleweight debut.
Win	8–2	Shedrick Goodridge	TKO (punches)	Bellator 95	April 4, 2013	2	4:22	Atlantic City, New Jersey, United States	Catchweight (173 lb) bout; Goodridge missed weight.
Win	7–2	Richard Rigmaden	Submission (armbar)	XFE: Cage Wars 18	October 13, 2012	1	1:31	Chester, Pennsylvania, United States	
Win	6–2	Aung La Nsang	Submission (triangle choke)	Matrix Fights 5	March 16, 2012	2	0:56	Philadelphia, Pennsylvania, United States	
Loss	5–2	Giedrius Karavackas	Submission (scarf-hold armlock)	Bellator 44	May 14, 2011	3	3:59	Atlantic City, New Jersey, United States	
Win	5–1	Don Carlo-Clauss	TKO (submission to punches)	Strikeforce: Fedor vs. Silva	February 12, 2011	1	4:10	East Rutherford, New Jersey, United States	
Loss	4–1	Myles Jury	Submission (standing rear-naked choke)	KOTC: No Mercy	September 17, 2010	1	2:55	Mashantucket, Connecticut, United States	
Win	4–0	Koa Ramos	Submission (guillotine choke)	KOTC: Honor	May 14, 2010	1	0:50	Mescalero, New Mexico, United States	
Win	3–0	Dave Concepción	KO (head kick)	Adrenaline: New Breed	February 26, 2010	1	0:09	Atlantic City, New Jersey, United States	
Win	2–0	Dustin Collins	Submission (armbar)	Arena Rumble: Horn vs. Guida	September 12, 2009	2	4:19	Spokane, Washington, United States	
Win	1–0	Mitch Filer	Submission (rear-naked choke)	WCA: Caged Combat	June 6, 2009	1	0:47	Atlantic City, New Jersey, United States	

== Boxing record ==
Professional record breakdown
2 matches	2 wins	0 losses
By knockout	1	0
By decision	1	0

Res.	Record	Opponent	Method	Event	Date	Round	Time	Location	Notes
Win	2–0	Kyle Mcnutt	Decision (Unanimous)	Kings Promotions	May 12, 2017	4	12:00	Philadelphia, Pennsylvania, United States	199 lb cruiserweight fight
Win	1–0	Joe Parkinson	KO	Kings Promotions	March 11, 2017	1	0:35	Philadelphia, Pennsylvania, United States	Pro Debut
