= Bully Beatdown =

Television series

- Starring: Jason "Mayhem" Miller
- Country of origin: United States
- No. of seasons: 3
- No. of episodes: 24 (list of episodes)

Production
- Executive producers: Mark Burnett; Eric Van Wagenen; James Rowley
- Running time: 30 minutes

Original release
- Network: MTV
- Release: March 22, 2009 – October 4, 2012

Bully Beatdown is an American reality television series created by Mark Burnett that aired on MTV. In each episode, show host Jason "Mayhem" Miller challenged bullies to fight against a professional mixed martial artist for a chance to win $10,000. The money they would receive depended on their performance against their opponent, with any money they didn't win going to the bully's victims. If the bully managed to submit or knock out the martial artist at any time, they won a $5,000 bonus.

== Format ==
Episodes in the first season featured four segments. The first segment involved Mayhem revealing a video featuring the victims describing their bullying situation and asking for help. This was followed by the host meeting with the victims in person and briefly discussing their problems. Mayhem and the victims would then confront the bully, and Mayhem would offer the bully $10,000 to fight a professional MMA fighter. In all of the episodes that aired, the bully accepted.

The next segment consisted of Mayhem bringing the bully into his gym to see how the bully fights in order to help him determine whom to put in the cage against him. During this segment, Mayhem introduced the bullies to their corner man, and would usually briefly discuss the fight with them. The segment would end with the victims meeting the fighter who would be challenging their bully, and the audience would be shown clips of the bully preparing in the locker room. The third segment would begin with Mayhem standing in the ring with the victims, introducing them to the crowd. After a brief introduction, the bully would be brought out to boos from the crowd. Mayhem would then let the bullies and victims have a few last words before bringing out the fighter.

Once the professional fighter had entered the cage, the audience would be shown a short segment explaining the rules. Finally, long-time professional referee "Big" John McCarthy would begin the first round. Round 1 was a 3-minute grappling-only round. The bully would begin the round with $5,000, and would loses $1,000 every time they were forced to tap out (with the lost money going to the victims).

The final segment began with an explanation of the rules for Round 2, a 3-minute kickboxing round. The bully wins $5,000 if they can survive the entire 3 minutes, but does not get any money if they quit or get KO'd or the referee stops the fight. After the round ends, Mayhem deals out the money, and asks the bully if there is anything they want to say to their victim(s). In most episodes, the bully offered an apology.

In Season 2, the format of the first half of the show was changed significantly. The show starts with Mayhem in the cage. He first presents the victims' tape, and is then joined by the victims in the cage. This is followed by a video from the bully explaining why they pick on their victims, often intercut with footage of them at work, playing a sport, or working out. The next segment would begin with the bully already having agreed to fight. Mayhem would interview the bully and the show would then cut to fight night. This would begin with Mayhem introducing the victims to their fighter, and leaving them to tell their story to him. Meanwhile, Mayhem would head over to the bully's locker room and briefly discuss the upcoming fight with them. This is followed by a shot of side by side stats showing the heights and weights of the bully and the fighter. This was occasionally accompanied by another piece of information, often as a joke, such as the unconfirmed fighting records of the bullies. After this the bully would be brought in to the cage and the rest of the episode would proceed in the same manner as in the previous season.

Season 3 followed the same format as Season 2 except that the fight rounds were extended from three minutes to five minutes. In this season's first episode, Mayhem fought the bully himself in addition to serving as the host.

== Controversy ==
It has been suggested that Bully Beatdown is largely staged and that in most cases "the bully/victim combo had never even met prior to the taping of each episode". One of the "bullies" depicted had included his appearance on the show in his acting resume. Another bully is a professional stuntman who had previously appeared in other TV shows.

In response, Jason Miller wrote what he labeled a "troll post" in which he called the show "completely fake" to mock those who call the show fake. Miller later stated on his blog that the physical beatings depicted on the show could not be faked. He referred to the bullies as "douchebags" who actually believe that they can beat professional fighters. Miller maintained that the show is "legit".

== Cast ==
- Host: Jason "Mayhem" Miller

*Miller Also served as the fighter in the first episode of Season 3.

- Referee: "Big" John McCarthy
- Announcer: Hans Olsen
- Bullies' corner man: Jeremy Williams
- Bullies' trainer: Carlos "Cutman" Vargas
- Recurring fighters:

- Jake Shields
- Eddie Alvarez
- Tony Bonello
- Jon Murphy
- Michael Westbrook
- Nick Gaston (two episodes filmed)

== Episodes ==
| Air Date | Episode | Bully | Victim(s) | Mixed Martial artist | Money earned by bully | Money earned by victim(s) | Viewers (in millions) | Rating/Share | Demo |
|---|---|---|---|---|---|---|---|---|---|
| | Unaired Pilot | | | | | | | | |
| 3/22/09 | Season 1 Episode 1 | Ryan | Alan | Tony Bonello | $2,000 | $8,000 | | | |
| 3/29/09 | Season 1 Episode 2 | Vince | Josh & Adam | Michael Westbrook | $1,000 | $9,000 | | | |
| 4/5/09 | Season 1 Episode 3 | Christian | Brian & Cameron | Conor Heun | $0 | $10,000 | | | |
| 4/12/09 | Season 1 Episode 4 | Jonathan | Sergio & Jason | Jake Shields | $2,000 | $8,000 | | | |
| 4/19/09 | Season 1 Episode 5 | Eriq | Linda | Jon Murphy | $0 | $10,000 | | | |
| 4/26/09 | Season 1 Episode 6 | Dennis | Stan & Andrey | Thomas Denny | $10,000 | $0 | | | |
| Online Only | Season 1 Episode 7 | Garrett | Kyle & Robert | Jake Shields | $0 | $10,000 | | | |
| 8/13/09 | Season 1 Episode 8 | James | Sean | Ben Lagman | $7,000 | $3,000 | | | |
| 8/27/09 | Season 2 Episode 1 | Brandon | Sean & Alex | Eddie Alvarez | $0 | $10,000 | | | |
| 9/3/09 | Season 2 Episode 2 | Jason | Josh & Brett | Jon Murphy | $2,000 | $8,000 | | | |
| 9/10/09 | Season 2 Episode 3 | Randall | Jefferson | Jake Shields | $5,000 | $5,000 | | | |
| 9/17/09 | Season 2 Episode 4 | Nathan | Martin & Adesh | Andrei Arlovski | $0 | $10,000 | | | |
| 9/24/09 | Season 2 Episode 5 | Wes | Chris | Tony Bonello | $1,000* | $9,000* | | | |
| 10/1/09 | Season 2 Episode 6 | Colt | Timmy | Tony Lopez | $1,000 | $9,000 | | | |
| 10/8/09 | Season 2 Episode 7 | Garrett | Nicholas & Eric | Michael Westbrook | $3,000 | $7,000 | | | |
| 10/15/09 | Season 2 Episode 8 | Emil | Anthony & Mo | Nick Gaston | $0 | $10,000 | | | |
| Unaired | Season 2 Episode 9 | Marquez | Richard & Edward | Quinn Mulhern | $6,000 | $4,000 | | | |
| Unaired | Season 2 Episode 10 | Harley | Lewis | Ricky Legere | $9,000 | $1,000 | | | |
| 11/4/10 | Season 3 Episode 1 | Andy | Steven & Taylor | Jason "Mayhem" Miller | $0 | $10,000 | | | |
| 11/11/10 | Season 3 Episode 2 | Nick | Chris & Blair | Jeremy Horn | $0 | $10,000 | | | |
| 11/18/10 | Season 3 Episode 3 | Amanda | Keiko | Michelle Waterson | $0 | $10,000 | .920 | .6/1 | .4/1 |
| 12/2/10 | Season 3 Episode 4 | Evermont | Jesse & Colton | Bobby "King" Green | $0 | $10,000 | .773 | .5/1 | .3/1 |
| 12/9/10 | Season 3 Episode 5 | Kevin | Anthony & Sam | Tyron Woodley | $1,000 | $9,000 | .898 | .6/1 | .4/1 |
| 12/16/10 | Season 3 Episode 6 | Mike | Lorenzo & Joey | Eddie Alvarez | $0 | $10,000 | .756 | .5/1 | .3/1 |
| 12/23/10 | Season 3 Episode 7 | Jordan | Austin & Micah | Joe Riggs | $0 | $10,000 | | | |
| 9/28/12 | Season 3 Episode 8 | Tayfun | Chucky & Yunas | Nick Gaston | $0 | $10,000 | | | |
| 10/4/12 | Season 3 Episode 9 | Brett | Zack | Abel Cullum | $1,000 | $9,000 | | | |
| 9/28/12 | Season 3 Episode 10 | David | Keith & Alex | Sam Oropeza | $0 | $10,000 | | | |
| 9/29/12 | Season 3 Episode 11 | Tyler | Joe & Dylan | Daniel Cormier | $0 | $10,000 | | | |
| 10/4/12 | Season 3 Episode 12 | Michael | William | Daron Cruickshank | $0 | $10,000 | | | |

== Reception ==
The debut episode was the number one program in its time slot among males 12–34.
