= Cristiano Souza =

Brazilian mixed martial artist

- Born: August 2, 1982 (age 44); Brazil
- Other names: Soldier Boy, Soldado
- Height: 5 ft 10 in (1.78 m)
- Weight: 170 lb (77 kg; 12 st)
- Division: Welterweight
- Reach: 72 in (183 cm)
- Stance: Orthodox
- Fighting out of: Boca Raton, Florida
- Team: American Top Team
- Rank: Black belt in Brazilian Jiu-Jitsu; Black belt in Capoeira

Mixed martial arts record
- Total: 9
- Wins: 7
- By knockout: 3
- By submission: 3
- By decision: 1
- Losses: 2
- By knockout: 1
- By submission: 1

Other information
- Mixed martial arts record from Sherdog

Cristiano Souza (born August 2, 1982) is a Brazilian mixed martial artist who currently competes for the Bellator Fighting Championships in the Welterweight Division. He was a fighter on the first season of Fight Master: Bellator MMA

== Mixed martial arts career ==
=== Bellator Fighting Championships ===
On September 17, 2011, Souza made his Bellator debut defeating John Kelly at Bellator 50 via unanimous decision.

On November 9, 2012, Souza defeated Robert Otani at Bellator 80 via knockout due to punches in round one.

==== Fight Master: Bellator MMA ====
On May 6, 2013, it was announced that Souza would be featured as a participant on Bellator Fighting Championships reality TV show Fight Master: Bellator MMA, competing as a Welterweight.

In his elimination fight to get on the show, Souza defeated Steve Montgomery via knockout in the first round. During the team selection, Souza chose Randy Couture to be his coach. In his preliminary fight, Souza faced Evan Cutts. Despite controlling a majority of the fight, Souza lost to Cutts via triangle choke submission in the second round.

==== Bellator Return ====
Souza came back at Bellator 106 and was scheduled to fight Karo Parisyan but Parisyan withdrew due to injury and was replaced with Alejandro Gracia. Souza controlled the first two rounds before taking down and submitting Gracia via rear naked choke in the third round.

In March 2014, Souza entered the Bellator Season 10 Welterweight tournament as a replacement. He faced Sam Oropeza in the opening round at Bellator 112 and lost via TKO in the first round.

== Mixed martial arts record ==
Professional record breakdown
9 matches	7 wins	2 losses
By knockout	3	1
By submission	3	1
By decision	1	0

Res.	Record	Opponent	Method	Event	Date	Round	Time	Location	Notes
Loss	7–2	Jose Caceres	Submission (rear-naked choke)	Fight Time 35	February 1, 2017	2	2:45	Miami, Florida, United States	
Loss	7–1	Sam Oropeza	TKO (punches)	Bellator 112	March 14, 2014	1	3:07	Hammond, Indiana, United States	Bellator Season 10 Welterweight Tournament Quarterfinals
Win	7–0	Alejandro Gracia	Submission (rear naked choke)	Bellator 106	November 2, 2013	3	3:06	Long Beach, California, United States	
Win	6–0	Robert Otani	TKO (punches)	Bellator 80	November 9, 2012	1	2:46	Hollywood, Florida, United States	
Win	5–0	John Kelly	Decision (unanimous)	Bellator 50	September 17, 2011	3	5:00	Hollywood, Florida, United States	
Win	4–0	Alex Rojas	Submission (guillotine choke)	CFA 1: The Title	May 6, 2011	2	3:19	Miami, Florida, United States	
Win	3–0	Rory Shallcross	KO (punches)	AFO 11: Fusion	February 19, 2011	1	1:37	Tampa, Florida, United States	
Win	2–0	Andrew Flickenger	Submission (rear naked choke)	AOF 8: Fury	May 22, 2010	1	2:12	Estero, Florida, United States	
Win	1–0	Pedro Rubio	KO (punches)	AOF 5: Rumble at Robarts 5	October 23, 2009	1	1:39	Sarasota, Florida, United States	MMA debut
