= List of Bully Beatdown episodes =

This is a list of episodes from the MTV show Bully Beatdown.

== Season 1 ==
=== Unaired Pilot ===
A producer stated that the original pilot for the show, which included a female co-host, never aired.

=== Ryan: The Family Favorite ===
First aired: 22 March 2009

The victim for the series premier is named Alan, a man who gets bullied by his bigger younger brother. In his tape, Alan explains that Ryan gets away with bullying him because he is the family favorite. He also states that in the past Ryan pushed him down a flight of stairs and put his head through a wall. Another victim named Nick appears in the tape and accuses Ryan of humiliating him and giving him a scar on the forehead by pushing him down some bleachers. Ryan accepts Mayhem's challenge to fight an MMA fighter. Mayhem brings Ryan to his gym and decides to let Ryan punch him in the head (which he describes as annoying but not painful). After watching Ryan in the gym he decides to put Ryan up against Tony 'The Gun' Bonello. Ryan was tapped out three times in the first round; first for a rear naked choke, and then twice more for two consecutive guillotine chokes. In the second round, he was KO'd after a kick in the gut. After the fight Alan and Ryan hug and Ryan apologizes which Alan seems to accept.

- Bully: Ryan

Height: 6' (note: see weight below)
Weight: 200 lbs. (height and weight not officially given. listed height and weight are claimed by brother in his video, but are likely estimations.)

- Fighter: Tony 'The Gun' Bonello

Height: 6'2"
Weight: 200 lbs.

- Victim(s): Alan (bully's older brother). Another victim named Nick appeared in a testimonial in Alan's video, but doesn't actually take part in the episode.
- Money earned by Bully: $2,000
- Money earned by victim(s): $8,000
- Original airing: Sunday, 22 March 2009

=== Vince: The Roommate from Hell ===
First aired: 29 March 2009

Mayhem shows a tape of Josh and Adam, who are bullied by Josh's current and Adam's former roommate Vince, a basketball player. According to Adam, Vince doesn't pay rent, once threw him out of his own house, and broke his door. Vince accepts the challenge to fight, after initially hesitating. In addition to the money, Mayhem adds the additional stipulation that if Vince loses, he has to move out. He shows up to train at Mayhem's gym, during which he falls down after kicking Mayhem's bag, which causes Mayhem to laugh. He shows up to the fight and learns that his opponent will be former NFL wide receiver Michael Westbrook. During the first round, Vince tapped out four times in the first round, and was KO'd in the second round. He apologizes to Adam and Josh after the fight, but says in an interview afterwards that he will not be paying them the back rent, as the $9,000 they have just won will cover it. Adam notes that he will need a new roommate since Vince will be moving out, and asks Josh if he would like to move in with him, which Josh accepts.

- Bully: Vince Carosso

Height: 6'7"
Weight: 236 lbs.

- Fighter: Michael Westbrook

Height: 6'3"
Weight: 223 lbs.

- Victim(s): Josh and Adam (bully's current and former roommate respectively)
- Money earned by Bully: $1,000
- Money earned by victim(s): $9,000
- Original airing: Sunday, 29 March 2010

=== Christian: The Angry Couch Potato ===
First aired 5 April 2009

Mayhem helps out Cameron and Brian, by dropping Conor "Hurricane" Heun in the cage with Christian, a lazy, couch potato with a thirst for the pain of others.

- Bully: Christian

Height:
Weight:

- Fighter: Conor "Hurricane" Heun

Height: 5'10
Weight: 155 lbs

- Victim(s): Brian and Cameron
- Money earned by Bully: $0
- Money earned by victim(s): $10,000($5,000 each.)
- Original airing:

=== Jonathan: The Rollerblade Bully ===
First aired 12 April 2009

Mayhem Miller helps Sergio and Thomas with Jonathan, a self-proclaimed "aggressive in-line skater," who thinks he has the right to pick on weaker people in the neighborhood, by putting him in the ring with MMA champion Jake Shields to teach him a lesson he won't soon forget.

- Bully: Jonathan

Height:
Weight: 175 lbs

- Fighter: Jake Shields

Height: 5'11
Weight: 170 lbs

- Victim(s): Sergio and Thomas
- Money earned by Bully: $2000
- Money earned by victim(s): $8000
- Original airing: 12 April 2009

=== Eriq: The Bum Rapper ===
First aired 19 April 2009

Mayhem Miller helps Eriq's ex-girlfriend Linda, by putting him in the ring with MMA champion Jon "Man of Faith" Murphy. She is the first female victim to appear on Bully Beatdown. Eriq taps out five times in the first round and quits very shortly into the second round, claiming his shoulder popped out. The on-site doctor found no such injury, and Linda states that Eriq frequently uses a shoulder injury claim when he fears losing a fight. The information Mayhem provided from the doctor and the statement from Linda leave the audience knowing the high likelihood that Eriq 'punked out' with a fake injury. She won $10,000.

- Bully: Eriq

Height:
Weight:

- Fighter: Jon Murphy

Height: 6'3"
Weight: 248 lb

- Victim(s): Linda (bully's ex-girlfriend)
- Money earned by Bully: $0
- Money earned by victim(s): $10,000
- Original airing:

=== Dennis: The Neighborhood Menace ===
First aired 26 April 2009

Mayhem finds Stan and Andrey and puts local bully, Dennis, an Uzbek, in the ring with Thomas "Wildman" Denny to teach him a lesson. In the first round, Dennis survived by holding onto Thomas to prevent a submission. In the second round, Thomas laid out a barrage of punches to the midsection, but Dennis was not knocked out. Final results? All $10,000 going to the bully. Despite winning all the money, Dennis decided to stop bullying his victims Stan and Andrey. This is the first and only bully to win all of the money.

- Bully: Dennis

Height:
Weight:

- Fighter: Thomas Denny

Height: 5'10
Weight: 170 lbs

- Victim(s): Stan and Andrey
- Money earned by Bully: $10,000
- Money earned by victim(s): $0
- Original airing:

=== Garret: The King of Tustin ===
First aired: Online

Robert and Kyle have one major problem: Garrett. This self-proclaimed King of Tustin makes their lives miserable. The Queen of Tustin is crowned, courtesy of MMA Middleweight Jake Shields.

- Bully: Garrett

Height:
Weight:

- Fighter: Jake Shields

Height: 5'10
Weight: 170 lbs

- Victim(s): Kyle & Robert
- Money earned by Bully: $0
- Money earned by victim(s): $10,000
- Original airing: This episode was an online exclusive and was not aired on MTV in regular chronology with other episodes. It first aired on MTV2.

=== James: The Boss's Son ===
First aired: Online

James bullies fellow co-worker Sean. The only problem is that James is the boss's son. Ben Lagman submits James three times in the first round, but James survives the second round, despite taking quite a beating. This was Ben Lagman's first and, so far, only appearance in the series. The episode did not air in regular chronology and is not available on the Bully Beatdown website like most other episodes. It has been leaked on to the internet and it is unknown why the episode was not aired in the regular time slot. This episode has aired, late nights on MTV2.

- Bully: James

Height:
Weight: 200 lbs.

- Fighter: "Bad News" Ben Lagman

Height: 6'2
Weight: 193 lbs.

- Victim(s): Sean (bully's co-worker)
- Money earned by Bully: $7,000
- Money earned by victim(s): $3,000
- Original airing: This episode was not aired on MTV in regular chronology with other episodes; it first aired on MTV2.

== Season 2 ==
=== Brandon: The Line ===
First aired 27 August 2009

Former high school bully, Brandon, thinks he defines the line between the weak and the strong. He thought it would be funny to pick Alex up by the ankles, and "throw him like 15 feet across the gym." Brandon broke Sean's arm, and Sean must deal with it every day. That is, until Mayhem Miller brings in MMA champion Eddie Alvarez to teach him a lesson... Bully Beatdown-style. Brandon, the tool, ends up apologizing to them both straight up in the end. Alex and Sean won $10,000. Brandon later did porn under the name Robby Vega.

- Bully: Brandon
- Victim(s): Sean & Alex.
- Fighter: Eddie Alvarez
- Money earned by Bully: $0
- Money earned by victim(s): $10,000
- Original airing: 27 August 2009

=== Jason: The Pretty-Boy Bully ===
First aired 3 September 2009

Jason gets in the ring with MMA fighter Jon Murphy. Out of the $5,000 he could have won in the first round, Jason walked away with $2,000, and in the kick boxing round lost and the Victims got the $5,000. After giving Jason a wedgie, Mayhem refers to the bully beatdown as 'God's Work'.

Victims- Step Brother, and friend from High school

- Bully: Jason
- Victim(s): Josh & Brett
- Fighter: Jon Murphy
- Money earned by Bully: $2,000
- Money earned by victim(s): $8,000($4,000 each)
- Original airing:

=== Randall: The Lyrical MC Bully ===
First aired: 10 September 2009

Bully Randall thinks he's a rapper and refers to himself as “Bac-Dizzle” Mayhem Miller releases MMA super-star Jake Shields on him. Randall stands as one of just three bullies to last the 2nd round, and has won the 3rd highest amount with $5,000.

- Bully: Randall
- Victim(s): Jefferson
- Fighter: Jake Shields
- Money earned by Bully: $5,000
- Money earned by victim(s): $5,000
- Original airing:

=== Nathan: The Big Nasty Bully ===
First aired: 17 September 2009

Victims Martin and Adesh have a big problem with big bully Nathan. He's made their lives miserable and have the physical and emotional scars to prove it. Mayhem calls upon legendary MMA fighter, Andrei Arlovski to clean this bully's clock. He was knocked out and submitted five times. Nathan's taunting of Arlovski only makes his beating worse. Martin and Adesh won $10,000.

- Bully: Nathan(Big Nasty)

Height: 6'4
Weight 285 lbs.

- Victim(s): Martin and Adesh
- Fighter: Andrei Arlovski

Height: 6'4
Weight 242 lbs.

- Money earned by Bully: $0
- Money earned by victim(s): $10,000
- Original airing:

=== Wes: The Meat-Stick Bully ===
First aired: 24 September 2009

Victim Chris has a problem with a tobacco spittin', hockey playing Texan and self-proclaimed "meat-stick", Wes. Mayhem enlists Tony Bonello to put this bully in his place. He was submitted 4 times and knocked out, but with an illegal head kick. Wes actually managed to knock down Tony Bonello which, apparently, upset the MMA fighter enough for him to break the rules. The kick to the head was hard enough that Wes could not remember where he was, or any of the fight. Because of the illegal kick, the bully received the $5,000 for that round. However, Wes refused it, stating "A knockout's a knockout," and then apologized to Chris by giving the money to him. Mayhem refers to Chris as his favorite victim because he is cute and adorable.

- Bully: Wes
- Victim(s): Chris
- Fighter: Tony Bonello
- Money earned by Bully: $6,000 (but turned down $5,000 from the 2nd round; left with $1,000).
- Money earned by victim(s): $4,000 (but the Bully let him keep the $5,000 from Round 2, left with $9,000).
- Original airing:

=== Colt: The Nebraska Bad Ass ===
First aired: 1 October 2009

DJ Timmy recruits Mayhem Miller to solve his bully problem... Colt, a tough-talking redneck from Nebraska. Mayhem gives Colt the heavyweight and light heavyweight champion of the King of the Cage, Tony Lopez. Colt tapped out four times in the first round, and got knocked out in the second, so Timmy received $9,000.

- Bully: Colt Nelms

Height: 6'0
Weight: 212 lb

- Victim(s): Timmy(DJ)
- Fighter: Tony Lopez

Height: 6'4
Weight: 205 lb

- Money earned by Bully: $1,000
- Money earned by victim(s): $9,000
- Original airing:

=== Garrett: The Psycho Nut-job ===
First aired: 8 October 2009

Mayhem Miller brings in NFL-player turned Pro MMA fighter Michael Westbrook to help victims Nicholas and Eric. How will Westbrook handle Garrett, the craziest bully ever? Garrett tapped out twice in the first round and was knocked out in the second round, so Nicholas and Eric won $7,000.

- Bully: Garrett

Height: 6'0
Weight: 199 lb

- Victim(s): Nicholas and Eric
- Fighter: Michael Westbrook

Height: 6'3
Weight: 212 lb

- Money earned by Bully: $3,000
- Money earned by victim(s): $7,000
- Original airing:

=== Emil: The Beefy Barbarian Bully ===
First aired: 15 October 2009

Emil is a self-proclaimed Assyrian bully who was brought to the show by his victims, Anthony and Mo. Mo's girlfriend is friends with the bully and she feels bad because he has made their lives miserable with his bullying. Emil was pitted against emerging MMA fighter Nick Gaston, who forced him to tap out five times in one minute, thirty six seconds. He withdrew from the second round, the only contestant having done so to this point. Anthony and Mo won $10,000 and an apology from Emil.

- Bully: Emil Mansoor

Height: 5'9
Weight: 245 lb

- Victim(s): Anthony and Mo
- Fighter: Nick Gaston

Height: 6'4
Weight: 265 lb

- Money earned by Bully: $0
- Money earned by victim(s): $10,000 ($5,000 each)
- Original airing:

=== Unaired episodes ===
==== Marquez: The Wannabe B-Boy ====
Meet Marquez, a street fighter who makes life miserable for twins Richard and Edward. Mayhem brings in Brazilian jiu-jitsu specialist, Quinn Mulhern standing at 6'3 and weighing in at 177 lbs, with a record of 14 wins and 1 loss to put him in his place. This episode has never aired on American TV and is not available on the Bully Beatdown website like most other episodes. The episode has been aired in the Netherlands, the Fox8 channel of Foxtel and Austar in Australia, and MTV Latin America. Many have speculated that the bully winning more money is the reason why it was never broadcast in America.

- Bully: Marquez

Height: 5'9
Weight: 167 lb

- Victim(s): Richard and Edward
- Fighter: Quinn Mulhern

Height: 6'3
Weight: 177 lb

- Money earned by Bully: $6,000
- Money earned by victim(s): $4,000
- Original airing: This episode has never aired in the United States.

==== Harley ====
Ricky Legere fights a bully named Harley, to defend a French kid. The bully only taps out one time in the first round, and stands through the second one, leaving the bully with $9000.

- Bully: Harley

Height: 5'8"
Weight: 80kg

- Victim(s): Lewis
- Fighter: Rick Legere

Height: 5'8
Weight: 85 kg

- Money earned by Bully: $9,000
- Money earned by victim(s): $1,000

== Season 3 ==
=== Andy: Get The Poison Out ===
First aired: 4 November 2010

Meet Andy, the self-appointed king of Fresno. He is an obnoxious bully who makes life miserable for his victims, Steven and Taylor. He also makes the biggest mistake of calling out Mayhem, so Mayhem brings out "the greatest fighter he has ever known" to take care of Andy. That fighter turns out to be Mayhem himself. After easily being tapped out 5 times in the first round and knocked out in the second round, Steven and Taylor won $10,000. After the fight, Mayhem tells a humbled Andy that he had to deal with bullies most of his life and implores him to change his ways because he eventually will come across someone that is bigger, badder and meaner than Andy himself.

- Bully: Andy

Height: 6'2
Weight: 199 lbs

- Victim(s): Steven and Taylor
- Fighter: Jason "Mayhem" Miller

Height: 6'1
Weight: 198 lbs

- Money earned by Bully: $0
- Money earned by victim(s): $10,000
- Original airing:

=== Michael: All American D-Bag ===
Michael, who calls himself an all-American badass, picked on William because of his culture and hobbies. It is unknown why this episode has never aired in America. However, it has aired on the Fox8 channel of Foxtel and Austar in Australia. It has never been leaked on the internet, and is not available on the Bully Beatdown website. A preview can be seen at the end of Andy's episode. Michael tapped out five times in the first round and was knocked out with a stomach blow in the second. William won $10,000 and an apology from his bully.

- Bully: Michael
- Victim: William
- Fighter: Daron Cruickshank

Height: 5'8"
Weight: 170 lb

- Money earned by Bully: $0
- Money earned by victim: $10,000
- Original airing: This aired on 9/28/12.

=== Nick: The Truck Stops Here ===
First aired: 11 November 2010

Meet Nick, he is a bully who calls himself "The Truck". He's both a singer in a Death Metal band and an in-line skater who makes life miserable for his victims, Chris and Blair. Mayhem Miller brings in legendary MMA fighter, Jeremy Horn to stop the truck once and for all. Nick tapped out five times in the first round, and got knocked out in the second round with a kick to the body. Chris and Blair won $10,000 and an apology from Nick.

- Bully: Nick

Height: 6'4
Weight: 197 lb

- Victim(s): Chris & Blair
- Fighter: Jeremy Horn

Height: 6'1
Weight: 205 lb

- Money earned by Bully: $0
- Money earned by victim(s): $10,000
- Original airing:

=== Amanda: Two Girls, One Cage ===
First aired: 18 November 2010

Meet Amanda, Bully Beatdown's first female bully with a bad attitude. She stands at 5'7 and makes life miserable for her victim, Keiko. Keiko is the second female victim to appear on the show, the first being Linda. Amanda calls herself "the queen" so Mayhem Miller brings in female MMA fighter Michelle Waterson who's done kickboxing since she was 10 years old to teach her a lesson. In the first round, she tapped out five times. In the second round, Amanda got KO'd with a brutal punch to her stomach. Keiko won $10,000 and an apology from Amanda.

- Bully: Amanda

Height: 5'7

- Victim(s): Keiko
- Fighter: Michelle Waterson

Height: 5'3

- Money earned by Bully: $0
- Money earned by victim(s): $10,000
- Original airing:

=== Evermont: The Royal Rumble ===
First aired: 2 December 2010

Meet Evermont, a wannabe rapper who says he can "smell the bitch" in his victims. He calls himself "the king" and makes life miserable for Jesse and Colton. Mayhem Miller brings in professional MMA Brazilian jiu-jitsu fighter Bobby "King" Green who has a record of 14 wins and 3 losses to put Evermont in his place. In the first round, Bobby Green made him tap out five times. In the second round, Evermont got scared and didn't continue into the second round. He was the second bully to withdraw from the second round, the first being Emil. Jesse and Colton won $10,000.

- Bully: Evermont King

Height: 5'6
Weight: 181 lb

- Victim(s): Jesse and Colton
- Fighter: Bobby "King" Green

Height: 5'10
Weight: 174 lb

- Money earned by Bully: $0
- Money earned by victim(s): $10,000
- Original airing:

=== Kevin: Hair Today, Gone Tomorrow ===
First aired: 9 December 2010

Meet Kevin, a bully who calls himself a natural. He is a hair-obsessed greaser that makes life miserable for his victims, Anthony and Sam. Mayhem Miller recruits Amateur Wrestler and MMA fighter Tyron Woodley to beat him down. Kevin makes a bet with Mayhem that if he loses all $10,000, he has to cut his hair. In the first round, he tapped out four times and barely escapes with $1,000 with a bruised ego. In the second round, he got TKO'd. Despite technically being allowed to keep his hair, as part of Kevin's apology, he allows Mayhem to cut his hair. Anthony and Sam won $9,000.

- Bully: Kevin Garcia

Height: 5'11
Weight: 175 lbs.

- Victim(s): Anthony (co-worker) and Sam
- Fighter: Tyron Woodley

Height: 5'9
Weight: 182 lbs.

- Money earned by Bully: $1,000
- Money earned by victim(s): $9,000
- Original airing:

=== Mike: Creatine Rage ===
First Aired: 16 December 2010

Meet Mike, the shortest bully to appear on the show. He stands at 5'4 and is a Bronx gym rat who makes life miserable for his victims, Lorenzo and Joey. Mayhem Miller brings in MMA fighter Eddie Alvarez with a record of 22 wins and 2 losses to teach him a lesson. In the first round, Mike tapped out five times. In the second round, he got K.O'd. Mike is the first bully to get K.O.'d without getting 1 punch thrown at him. Lorenzo and Joey won $10,000.

- Bully: Mike

Height: 5'4
Weight: 160 lbs

- Victim(s): Lorenzo and Joey
- Fighter: Eddie Alvarez

Height: 5'9
Weight: 169 lbs

- Money earned by Bully: $0
- Money earned by victim(s): $10,000
- Original airing:

=== Jordan: Bring Out The Boar ===
First Aired: 23 December 2010

Meet Jordan, a loud mouthed bully who calls himself the boar. He makes life miserable for twins, Austin & Micah, since one of them is going to nursing school. His real name is Jordan Rush. The bad part of it is that he's a cop's son, so he says he's "At the Top of the Food Chain". So Mayhem brings in MMA Fighter Joe Riggs with a record of 34 wins and 12 losses, to teach Jordan a lesson. In the first round, he tapped out five times. During the second round, Joe finished Jordan off via TKO. Austin and Micah won $10,000. After the fight, a humbled Jordan apologized for his behavior.

- Bully: Jordan

Height: 5'9
Weight: 195 lb

- Victim(s): Austin and Micah
- Fighter: Joe Riggs

Height: 5'11
Weight: 202 lb

- Money earned by Bully: $0
- Money earned by victim(s): $10,000
- Original airing:

=== Brett Hazard: A Bully finds Religion ===
Meet Brett Hazard, a loud mouthed bully who picks on Zack because of his religion and even nominated him for Prom Queen. This episode did not air on American TV during the season's initial run on MTV but eventually aired on MTV2 on October 4, 2012. However, it has aired on the Fox8 channel of Foxtel and Austar in Australia. This episode is not available on the Bully Beatdown website or iTunes, and has not been leaked to the internet. A few clips of it can be seen at the end of the previous episode (Jordan: Bring Out The Boar). At the end of that episode, a preview for this episode was shown.

- Bully: Brett

Height: 5'8
Weight: 164 lb

- Victim(s): Zack
- Fighter: Abel Cullum

Height: 5'7
Weight: 158 lb

- Money earned by Bully: $1000
- Money earned by victim(s): $9000
- Original airing: Friday October 4, 2012.

=== Brooklyn Bully ===
The Supertrailer for Season 3 showed an episode with a Bully proclaiming that there was "nothing tougher than a Brooklyn Bully" fighting Nick Gaston. The Bully tapped out twice due to "nothing" among his 5 taps and was TKOed 1:04 into the kickboxing round.

- Bully: Tayfun Dasdemir

Height: 5'11
Weight: 341 lb

- Victim(s): Chuckie, Yunas
- Fighter: Nick Gaston

Height: 6'5
Weight: 266 lb

- Money earned by Bully: $0
- Money earned by victim(s): $10,000
- Original airing: This episode was aired on MTV Canada on March 7, 2011. This episode aired on September 28, 2012 on MTV 2.

=== David: Tears Of A Clown ===
David (self-nicknamed 'The Beast') is an angry, bartending bully that spends his time picking on performance artists Keith and Alex. To help them with their bully, Mayhem Miller brings in an undefeated MMA fighter. This episode has aired on Fox8 on Foxtel in Australia.

- Bully: David

Height: 5'11
Weight: 184 lb

- Victim(s): Keith and Alex
- Fighter: Sam Oropeza

Height: 6'2
Weight: 183 lb

- Money earned by Bully: $0
- Money earned by victim(s): $10,000
- Original airing: This episode aired on September 28, 2012 on MTV 2.

=== Tyler ===
Tyler considers himself "an ambassador of awesomeness", and is really proud of his beer belly and high school wrestling experience. He bullies Joe and Dylan, with whom he shares his high school dorm, and seems to relish on peeing on things such as his dormmates' door and bed. Miller then decides to match him up with two-time Olympic wrestler Daniel Cormier, who held a perfect MMA record.

- Bully: Tyler

Height: 6'1"
Weight: 250 lbs

- Victim(s): Joe and Dylan
- Fighter: Daniel Cormier

Height: 5'11"
Weight: 247 lbs

- Money earned by Bully: $0
- Money earned by victim(s): $10,000
- Original airing: This episode aired on MTV2 on September 29, 2012. In MTV Latin America, this is run as the first episode of season 3, followed by the "Michael" episode, thus omitting the episode where Mayhem fights Andy.
