= Joe Williams (fighter) =

American mixed martial arts fighter

- Born: July 22, 1985 (age 41); Orange, California, United States
- Other names: Mongo
- Height: 5 ft 10 in (1.78 m)
- Weight: 170 lb (77 kg; 12 st)
- Division: Welterweight (170 lb); Middleweight (185 lb)
- Reach: 69.0 in (175 cm)
- Fighting out of: Huntington Beach, California, United States
- Team: Empire Training Center; Kings MMA
- Trainer: Muay Thai: Rafael Cordeiro; Wrestling: Jacob Harman
- Years active: 2011–present

Mixed martial arts record
- Total: 11
- Wins: 9
- By knockout: 4
- By submission: 3
- By decision: 2
- Losses: 2
- By submission: 1
- By decision: 1

Other information
- Mixed martial arts record from Sherdog

Joe Williams (born July 22, 1985) is an American mixed martial artist who competes in Bellator's welterweight division.

== Background ==
Williams has an extensive background in wrestling. He started to train when he was eight years old and during his juvenility he earned many state and national titles along with many other honors.

== Mixed martial arts career ==
=== Early career ===
Williams started his professional career in 2011. He fought mainly for California-based promotion Respect in the Cage.

With a record of 7–0 and victories over Strikeforce veteran Eddie Mendez and WEC veteran Fernando Gonzalez, he signed with Bellator.

=== Bellator MMA ===
Williams made his debut on August 24, 2012 at Bellator 73 against fellow newcomer Andy Uhrich. Williams had his first defeat via unanimous decision (30-27, 29-28, 29-28).

Williams faced Rod Montoya on October 5, 2012 at Bellator 75. He won via submission in the very first round.

Williams faced UFC veteran Jamie Yager on January 17, 2013 at Bellator 85. He won via TKO in the first round.

==== Fight Master: Bellator MMA ====
On May 6, 2013, it was announced that Williams would be featured as a participant on Bellator MMA reality TV show Fight Master. In the second episode, Joe lost in the entry round via unanimous decision against Cole Williams.

Williams received another chance after the medical suspension of Andy Uhrich due to a cut over his eye during his fight against Dom O'Grady in the entry round. Frank Shamrock picked Williams to fill the last spot of the team. In the fifth episode, Williams is shown facing Ismael Gonzalez in the round of 16 of the tournament. He completely dominated Gonzalez on the ground in round one and finished the fight via submission due to an arm-triangle choke in round two. In the quarterfinals, Williams faced Eric Bradley and lost via majority decision after two rounds.

==== Post Fight Master ====
Williams faced Jesse Juarez on November 2, 2013 at Bellator 106. He lost via submission due to a guillotine choke early in the first round.

== Championships and accomplishments ==
=== Mixed Martial Arts ===
- Respect in the Cage
  - RITC middleweight title (one time)
  - Three successful title defenses

=== Adult Citrus Industry ===
- Recipient of "Golden Grapefruit" award

== Mixed martial arts record ==
Professional record breakdown
| 11 matches | 9 wins | 2 losses |
| By knockout | 4 | 0 |
| By submission | 3 | 1 |
| By decision | 2 | 1 |

| Res. | Record | Opponent | Method | Event | Date | Round | Time | Location | Notes |
|---|---|---|---|---|---|---|---|---|---|
| Loss | 9–2 | Jesse Juarez | Submission (guillotine choke) | Bellator 106 | November 2, 2013 | 1 | 0:57 | Long Beach, California, United States | |
| Win | 9–1 | Jamie Yager | TKO (punches) | Bellator 85 | January 17, 2013 | 1 | 4:02 | Irvine, California, United States | |
| Win | 8–1 | Rod Montoya | Submission (rear-naked choke) | Bellator 75 | October 5, 2012 | 1 | 3:17 | Hammond, Indiana, United States | |
| Loss | 7–1 | Andy Uhrich | Decision (unanimous) | Bellator 73 | August 24, 2012 | 3 | 5:00 | Tunica Resorts, Mississippi, United States | |
| Win | 7–0 | Vince Alaalatoa | Submission (arm-triangle choke) | RITC - Respect in the Cage | September 10, 2011 | 3 | 2:58 | Pomona, California, United States | Defended RITC middleweight title |
| Win | 6–0 | Ben Martin | KO (punch) | RITC - Respect in the Cage | July 30, 2011 | 1 | 3:55 | Pomona, California, United States | Defended RITC middleweight title |
| Win | 5–0 | Fernando Gonzalez | Decision (split) | RITC - Respect in the Cage | June 4, 2011 | 5 | 5:00 | Pomona, California, United States | Defended RITC middleweight title |
| Win | 4–0 | Eddie Mendez | Decision (unanimous) | RITC - Respect in the Cage | April 23, 2011 | 5 | 5:00 | Pomona, California, United States | Won RITC middleweight title |
| Win | 3–0 | Tony Gianopoulos Jr. | TKO (punches) | RITC - Respect in the Cage | March 12, 2011 | 1 | 2:57 | Pomona, California, United States | |
| Win | 2–0 | Daniel Mancha | TKO (punches) | KOTC: Empire | February 3, 2011 | 2 | 2:06 | San Bernardino, California, United States | |
| Win | 1–0 | Tony Dalton | Submission (rear-naked choke) | RITC - Respect in the Cage | January 15, 2011 | 3 | 2:59 | Pomona, California, United States | |
