= Fight Master: Bellator MMA =

Bellator MMA based reality television series

- Genre: Reality; Sports
- Starring: Randy Couture, Frank Shamrock, Greg Jackson, and Joe Warren
- Country of origin: United States

Production
- Running time: 60 minutes
- Production company: Profiles Television Productions

Original release
- Network: Spike TV
- Release: June 19 – August 29, 2013

Fight Master: Bellator MMA is a mixed martial arts based reality television series. It centers on the promotion Bellator Fighting Championships and aired on Spike TV. The series debuted on June 19, 2013.

== Background ==
The series was officially announced by Bellator and Spike TV at a press conference on February 5, 2013. The coaches and trainers for the series, which will feature 32 welterweight fighters, will be Randy Couture, Frank Shamrock, Greg Jackson, and Joe Warren. The 32 fighters will be competing for a spot in Bellator's welterweight tournament. The weekly series will culminate in a live season finale on Spike TV with the winner advancing into the fall welterweight tournament. It debuted on Spike TV on June 19, 2013.

The first seven shows aired on Wednesday nights at 10pm. However, due to declining ratings, Spike opted to move the show's final three episodes to Thursday at 11pm to follow Total Nonstop Action Wrestling.

== Cast ==
=== Coaches ===
- Randy Couture, head coach of black team
- Frank Shamrock, head coach of green team
- Greg Jackson, head coach of red team
- Joe Warren, head coach of blue team

=== Fighters ===
- Team Jackson
  - Tim Welch, Eric Bradley, Bryan Travers, Joe Riggs
- Team Couture
  - AJ Matthews, Cole Williams, Cristiano Souza, Mike Bronzoulis

- Team Shamrock
  - Nick Barnes, Chris Lozano, Mike Dubois, Joe Williams
- Team Warren
  - Eric Scallan, Evan Cutts, Jason Norwood, Ismael Gonzalez

Fighters eliminated during the entry round

- Chip Pollard, Christopher Curtis, Brendan Tierney, Darryl Cobb, Josh Quayhagen, Rob Mills, Tom Gallicchio, Brett Nakamura, Joe Williams, Steve Montgomery, Jacob Ortiz, Marcus Aurelio, Dom O'Grady, Artenas Young, Gareth Joseph, Frank Carrillo (due to injury; replaced by Rob Mills), Andy Uhrich (due to injury; replaced by Joe Williams)

== Episodes ==
Episode 1: "Fight to Choose" (June 19, 2013)

- An introduction video explained the Fight Master concept where fighters are allowed to pick their own coaches.
- The introduction of the four coaches, Randy Couture, Frank Shamrock, Greg Jackson and Joe Warren.
- The first five preliminary fights were shown:

Tim Welch defeated Chip Pollard via KO (punch) in the first round.

Welch chose Jackson as his coach.

Eric Scallan defeated Christopher Curtis by unanimous decision after two rounds.

Scallan chose Warren as his coach.

Nick Barnes defeated Brendan Tierney via submission (rear naked choke) in the first round.

Barnes chose Shamrock as his coach.

AJ Matthews defeated Darryl Cobb by unanimous decision after three rounds.

Matthews chose Couture as his coach.

Chris Lozano defeated Josh Quayhagen by unanimous decision after two rounds.

Lozano chose Shamrock as his coach.

Episode 2: "Which Camp Do You Choose?" (June 26, 2013)

- The elimination round continued with six more fights:

Mike Dubois defeated Rob Mills via submission (guillotine choke) in the first round.

Dubois chose Shamrock as his coach.

Eric Bradley defeated Tom Gallicchio by unanimous decision after two rounds.

Bradley chose Jackson as his coach.

Evan Cutts defeated Brett Nakamura via submission (rear naked choke) in first round.

Cutts chose Joe Warren as his coach.

Cole Williams defeated Joe Williams by unanimous decision after three rounds.

Williams chose Couture as his coach.

Jason Norwood defeated Jacob Ortiz by unanimous decision after two rounds.

Norwood chose Warren as his coach.

Cristiano Souza defeated Steve Montgomery by KO (punches) in the first round.

Souza chose Couture as his coach.

Episode 3: "Last Shot for Spot" (July 10, 2013)

- The elimination round continued with the final five fights:

Ismael Gonzalez defeated Marcus Aurelio via TKO (liver kick & punches) in the first round.

Gonzalez chose Warren as his coach.

Andy Uhrich defeated Dom O'Grady by unanimous decision after two rounds.

Due to a cut over his eye, Uhrich was disqualified from the competition.

Bryan Travers defeated Artenas Young by unanimous decision after three rounds.

Travers chose Jackson as his coach.

Mike Bronzoulis defeated Gareth Joseph by unanimous decision after two rounds.

Bronzoulis chose Couture as his coach.

- The final fight was scheduled to be Frank Carrillo against Joe Riggs. However, Carrillo injured his left shoulder while warming up and was unable to fight. With the approval of the athletic commission, Mills was allowed to re-enter the tournament.

Joe Riggs defeated Rob Mills by submission (heel hook) in the first round.

Riggs chose Jackson as his coach.

Episode 4: "Training Day" (July 17, 2013)

- The 15 advancing fighters move into the house and start training with the coaches.
- Due to being one fighter short, Shamrock is allowed to bring back a fighter who lost; he chose Joe Williams.
- The coaches rank the fighters in order of 1 through 16 and the fighters are randomly chosen in order to pick their fights
- Two elimination fights were held.

Cole Williams defeated Mike Dubois by submission (rear naked choke) in the first round.
Chris Lozano defeated Bryan Travers by split decision after three rounds.

Episode 5: "Strikers and Wrestlers" (July 24, 2013)

- Two more elimination fights were held.
- Norwood chose Bronzoulis to be his opponent.

Mike Bronzoulis defeated Jason Norwood by KO (punches) in the third round.

- Gonzalez chose Joe Williams to be his opponent.

Joe Williams defeated Ismael Gonzalez by submission (arm-triangle choke) in the second round.

Episode 6: "Old School, New School" (July 31, 2013)

- Two more elimination fights were held.
- Welch chose Barnes to be his opponent.

Nick Barnes defeated Tim Welch by submission (rear naked choke) in the first round.

- Top seed Riggs chose Scallan to be his opponent.

Joe Riggs defeated Eric Scallan by unanimous decision after two rounds.

Episode 7: "Who is the Underdog Now?" (August 7, 2013)

- The final two elimination fights were held.
- Souza chose Cutts to be his opponent.

Evan Cutts defeated Cristiano Souza by submission (triangle choke) in the second round.

- Matthews chose Bradley to be his opponent.

Eric Bradley defeated A.J. Matthews by unanimous decision after two rounds.

Episode 8: "Friend or Foe?" (August 15, 2013)

- The coaches rank the remaining fighters; Joe Riggs is once again the top seed.
- Cole Williams chose Barnes to be his opponent.

Cole Willams defeated Nick Barnes by TKO (punches) in the first round.

- Bellator fighter Muhammed "King Mo" Lawal shows up to watch the next match.
- Lozano chose Bronzoulis to be his opponent.

Mike Bronzoulis defeated Chris Lozano by unanimous decision after three rounds.

Episode 9: "Eyes on the Prize" (August 22, 2013)

- The last two quarterfinal matches are held.
- Bradley chose Joe Williams to be his opponent.
- This was a match between two former collegians as Bradley wrestled for the Penn State Nittany Lions, while Williams wrestled for the Michigan State Spartans.

Eric Bradley defeated Joe Williams by unanimous decision after two rounds.

- With Williams' loss, Team Shamrock has been eliminated from the tournament.
- Riggs chose Cutts to be his opponent.

Joe Riggs defeated Evan Cutts by unanimous decision after two rounds.

- With Cutts' loss, Team Warren has been eliminated from the tournament.

Episode 10: "It All Comes Down to This" (August 29, 2013)

- The final four fighters are ranked by the coaches with Cole Williams superseding Joe Riggs as the new top seed.
- Williams chose Riggs to be his opponent.

Joe Riggs defeated Cole Williams by split decision after three rounds.

- Bradley and Bronzoulis were the final two contestants.

Mike Bronzoulis defeated Eric Bradley via TKO (punches) in the second round.

- The two finalists, Riggs and Bronzoulis, faced off in the cage with their coaches Jackson and Couture, respectively.

== Coach selections ==
Order	Fighter	Coaches			
Order	Fighter	Joe Warren	Greg Jackson	Randy Couture	Frank Shamrock
1	Tim Welch	—		—	—
2	Eric Scallan		—	—	—
3	Nick Barnes	—	—	—	
4	AJ Matthews	—	—		—
5	Chris Lozano	—	—	—	
6	Mike Dubois	—	—	—	
7	Eric Bradley	—		—	—
8	Evan Cutts		—	—	—
9	Cole Williams	—	—		—
10	Jason Norwood		—	—	—
11	Cristiano Souza	—	—		—
12	Ismael Gonzalez		—	—	—
13	Andy Uhrich	—	—	—	—
14	Bryan Travers	—		—	—
15	Mike Bronzoulis	—	—		—
16	Joe Riggs	—		—	—

=== First round rankings ===
Rank	Name	Rank	Name
1st	Joe Riggs	9th	Nick Barnes
2nd	Cristiano Souza	10th	Mike Dubois
3rd	Chris Lozano	11th	Evan Cutts
4th	AJ Mathews	12th	Ismael Gonzalez
5th	Cole Williams	13th	Mike Bronzoulis
6th	Tim Welch	14th	Bryan Travers
7th	Eric Bradley	15th	Eric Scallan
8th	Jason Norwood	16th	Joe Williams

=== Second round rankings ===
Rank	Name	Rank	Name
1st	Joe Riggs	5th	Chris Lozano
2nd	Cole Williams	6th	Eric Bradley
3rd	Nick Barnes	7th	Joe Williams
4th	Evan Cutts	8th	Mike Bronzoulis

== Tournament Bracket ==
Elimination Round
[12] Ismael Gonzalez	SUB
[16] Joe Williams	2
[7] Eric Bradley	UD
[4] AJ Matthews	2
[8] Jason Norwood	KO
[13] Mike Bronzoulis	3
[14] Bryan Travers	SD
[3] Chris Lozano	3
[11] Evan Cutts	SUB
[2] Cristiano Souza	2
[1] Joe Riggs	UD
[15] Eric Scallan	2
[10] Mike Dubois	SUB
[5] Cole Williams	1
[6] Tim Welch	SUB
[9] Nick Barnes	1

Quarter-finals
[7] Joe Williams	MD
[6] Eric Bradley	2
[8] Mike Bronzoulis	UD
[5] Chris Lozano	3
[4] Evan Cutts	UD
[1] Joe Riggs	2
[2] Cole Williams	TKO
[3] Nick Barnes	1

Semi-finals
[3] Eric Bradley	2
[4] Mike Bronzoulis	TKO
[2] Joe Riggs	SD
[1] Cole Williams	3

Finale
Mike Bronzoulis	3
Joe Riggs	UD

Legend
	Team Couture (5-3)
	Team Jackson (5-3)
	Team Shamrock (3-4)
	Team Warren (1-4)
UD	Unanimous Decision
MD	Majority Decision
SD	Split Decision
SUB	Submission
(T) KO	(Technical) Knockout

== Finale ==
The finale between Joe Riggs and Mike Bronzoulis was expected to take place on September 7, 2013 at Bellator 98. However, on September 3, Riggs sustained a significant eye injury and the bout was postponed. The finale took place at Bellator 106 on November 2, 2013.

- Welterweight bout: (United States) Joe Riggs vs (United States) Mike Bronzoulis

Joe Riggs defeated Mike Bronzoulis unanimous decision (30-27, 30-27, 30-27) after three rounds.
