= 2018 in M-1 Global =

Information
- First date: February 9, 2018

Events

Fights

Chronology
2017 in M-1 Global	2018 in M-1 Global	2019 in M-1 Global

The year 2018 is the 21st year in the history of the M-1 Global, a mixed martial arts promotion based in Russia.

== List of events ==
#	Event title	Date	Arena	Location
1	M-1 Challenge 87 - Ashimov vs. Silander	February 9, 2018	M-1 Arena	Saint Petersburg, Russia
2	M-1 Challenge 88 - Ismagulov vs. Tutarauli	February 22, 2018	Olimpiyskiy	Moscow, Russia
3	M-1 Challenge 89 - Buchinger vs. Krasnikov	March 10, 2018	M-1 Arena	Saint Petersburg, Russia
3	M-1 Challenge 90 - Kunchenko vs. Butenko	March 30, 2018	M-1 Arena	Saint Petersburg, Russia
4	M-1 Challenge 91 - Swain vs. Nuertiebieke	May 12, 2018	Nanshan Culture & Sports Center	Shenzhen, China
5	M-1 Challenge 92 - Kharitonov vs. Vyazigin	May 24, 2018	M-1 Arena	Saint Petersburg, Russia
6	M-1 Challenge 93 - Shlemenko vs. Silva	June 1, 2018	Traktor Ice Arena	Chelyabinsk, Russia
7	M-1 Challenge 94 - Damkovsky vs. Ismagulov	June 15, 2018	Sports Complex "Orenburg"	Orenburg, Russia
8	M-1 Challenge 95 - Battle in the Mountains 7	July 21, 2018	The Mountain	Nazran, Russia
9	M-1 Challenge 96 - Mikutsa vs. Ibragimov	August 25, 2018	M-1 Arena	Saint Petersburg, Russia
10	M-1 Challenge 97 - Bogatov vs. Pereira	September 28, 2018		Kazan, Russia
11	M-1 Challenge 98 - Frolov vs. Silva	November 2, 2018		Chelyabinsk, Russia
12	M-1 Challenge 99 - Battle Of Narts 4	November 17, 2018		Ingushetia, Russia
13	M-1 Challenge 100 - Battle in Atyrau	December 15, 2018		Atyrau, Kazakhstan

== M-1 Challenge 87 - Ashimov vs. Silander ==
M-1 Challenge 87 - Ashimov vs. Silander
- Promotion: M-1 Global
- Date: February 9, 2018
- Venue: Ice Palace
- City: Saint Petersburg, Russia

M-1 Challenge 87 - Ashimov vs. Silander was a mixed martial arts event held by M-1 Global on February 9, 2018 at the M-1 Arena in Saint Petersburg, Russia.

=== Background ===
This event will feature an interim world title fight for the M-1 Flyweight Championship between Arman Ashimov and Mikael Silander as M-1 Challenge 87 headliner.

Finnish welterweight Juho Valamaa was injured and could not fight at M-1 Challenge 87. Levan Solodovnik will take his place against Shavkat Rakhmonov.

=== Results ===
M-1 Challenge 87
Weight Class				Method	Round	Time	Notes
Flyweight 57 kg	(Kazakhstan) Arman Ashimov	def.	(Finland) Mikael Silander	TKO (Punches)	2	3:05	For the interim M-1 Flyweight Championship.
Featherweight 66 kg	(Russia) Timur Nagibin	def.	(Brazil) Jadison Costa	KO (Punches)	3	0:18	
Light Heavyweight 93 kg	(Ukraine) Dimitriy Mikutsa	def.	(Brazil) Kleber Silva	Decision (Unanimous)	3	5:00	
Welterweight 77 kg	(Switzerland) Pablo Ortmann	def.	(Russia) Ingiskhan Ozdoev	Submission (Triangle Choke)	1	3:47	
Welterweight 77 kg	(Kazakhstan) Shavkat Rakhmonov	def.	(Georgia (country)) Levan Solodovnik	Submission (Triangle Choke)	2	4:42	
Preliminary Card
Welterweight 77 kg	(Russia) Danila Prikaza	def.	(Brazil) Anderson Queiroz	KO (Punches)	1	1:37	
Lightweight 70 kg	(Russia) Pavel Gordeev	def.	(Uzbekistan) Bobur Kurbonov	Decision (Unanimous)	3	5:00	
Lightweight 70 kg	(Finland) Jani Salmi	def.	(Russia) Nikolay Goncharov	Decision (Unanimous)	3	5:00	
Heavyweight 120 kg	(Russia) Adam Bogatirov	def.	(Spain) José Agustin	TKO (Knees and Punches)	1	2:54	
Heavyweight 120 kg	(Russia) Artem Nenakhov	def.	(France) Charles-Henri Tchoungui	Decision (Unanimous)	3	5:00	
Lightweight 70 kg	(Ukraine) Anatoly Liagu	def.	(Croatia) Aleksandar Rakas	Decision (Unanimous)	3	5:00	
Welterweight 77 kg	(Spain) Tino Gilaranz	def.	(Russia) Valentin Kryzhanovski	Decision (Unanimous)	3	5:00	

== M-1 Challenge 88 - Ismagulov vs. Tutarauli ==
M-1 Challenge 88 - Ismagulov vs. Tutarauli
- Promotion: M-1 Global
- Date: February 22, 2018
- Venue: Olimpiyskiy
- City: Moscow, Russia

M-1 Challenge 88 - Ismagulov vs. Tutarauli was a mixed martial arts event held by M-1 Global on February 22, 2018 at the Olimpiyskiy in Moscow, Russia.

=== Background ===
This event will feature two world title fight, first for the M-1 Lightweight Championship between Damir Ismagulov and Raul Tutarauli as M-1 Challenge 88 headliner, and a Bantamweight pairing between Movsar Evloev and Sergey Morozov for the M-1 Bantamweight Championship as co-headliner.

Giga Kukhalashvili was injured three weeks before the event, Khadis Ibragimov stepped in to face Stephan Puetz.

=== Results ===
M-1 Challenge 88
Weight Class				Method	Round	Time	Notes
Lightweight 70 kg	(Kazakhstan) Damir Ismagulov (c)	def.	(Georgia (country)) Raul Tutarauli	Decision (Unanimous)	5	5:00	For the M-1 Lightweight Championship.
Bantamweight 61 kg	(Russia) Movsar Evloev (c)	def.	(Kazakhstan) Sergey Morozov	Submission (Rear-Naked Choke)	3	3:47	For the M-1 Bantamweight Championship.
Middleweight 84 kg	(Russia) Valery Myasnikov	def.	(United States) Joseph Henle	TKO(Punches)	1	4:41	
Light Heavyweight 93 kg	(Russia) Khadis Ibragimov	def.	(Germany) Stephan Puetz	Submission (Bulldog Choke)	3	2:12	
Bantamweight 61 kg	(Russia) Bair Shtepin	def.	(Brazil) Heliton dos Santos	TKO (Punches)	1	2:17	
Preliminary Card
Featherweight 66 kg	(Kyrgyzstan) Busurmankul Abdibait uulu	def.	(Russia) Maxim Divnich	Decision (unanimous)	3	5:00	
Bantamweight 61 kg	(Russia) Aleksandr Osetrov	def.	(Russia) Sergey Klyuev	Decision (unanimous)	3	5:00	
Lightweight 70 kg	(Russia) Rubenilton Pereira	def.	(Kyrgyzstan) Rinat Sayakbaev	Decision (unanimous)	3	5:00	
Middleweight 84 kg	(Russia) Ruslan Shamilov	def.	(France) Reda Oudgou	Submission (Rear-Naked Choke)	2	3:12	
Middleweight 84 kg	(Azerbaijan) Talekh Nadzhafadze	def.	(Ukraine) Vitaliy Slipenko	Decision (unanimous)	3	5:00	
Heavyweight 120 kg	(Russia) Maksim Yakobyuk	def.	(Germany) Frank Kortz	TKO (punches)	2	4:06	
Catchweight 91 kg	(Ukraine) Vadim Shabadash	def.	(Bulgaria) Petar Petrov	TKO (Punches)	1	0:46	

== M-1 Challenge 89 - Buchinger vs. Krasnikov ==
M-1 Challenge 89 - Buchinger vs. Krasnikov
- Promotion: M-1 Global
- Date: March 10, 2018
- Venue: M-1 Arena
- City: Saint Petersburg, Russia

M-1 Challenge 89 - Buchinger vs. Krasnikov was a mixed martial arts event held by M-1 Global on March 10, 2018 at the M-1 Arena in Saint Petersburg, Russia.

=== Background ===
Chris Kelades had to withdraw due to visa issues. Oleg Aduchiev will step in as a replacement against Vitali Branchuk.

=== Results ===
M-1 Challenge 89
Weight Class				Method	Round	Time	Notes
Catchweight 68 kg	(Slovakia) Ivan Buchinger	def.	(Ukraine) Andrey Krasnikov	Submission (Anaconda Choke)	2	2:54	
Featherweight 66 kg	(Russia) Viktor Kolesnik	def.	(Brazil) David de Souza	Submission (Guillotine Choke)	1	0:44	
Heavyweight 120 kg	(Russia) Anton Vyazigin	def.	(Azerbaijan) Zaur Gadzhibabayev	KO (Punches)	1	0:16	
Lightweight 70 kg	(France) Mickaël Lebout	def.	(Belarus) Sergey Faley	KO (Punch)	1	4:53	
Flyweight 57 kg	(Russia) Oleg Aduchiev	def.	(Ukraine) Vitali Branchuk	TKO (Punches)	2	3:09	
Preliminary Card
Flyweight 57 kg	(Georgia (country)) Vazha Tsiptauri	def.	(Bulgaria) Dimitar Kostov	Submission (Guillotine Choke)	2	1:28	
Light Heavyweight 93 kg	(Ukraine) Denis Vygovsky	def.	(Brazil) Brendson Ribeiro	Decision (Majority)	3	5:00	
Featherweight 66 kg	(Russia) Nikita Solonin	def.	(Israel) Elazar Tariku	TKO (Punches)	1	0:51	
Lightweight 70 kg	(Russia) Alik Albogachiev	def.	(Russia) Rasul Magomedov	KO (Punches)	1	2;45	
Featherweight 66 kg	(Russia) Ivan Kibala	def.	(Spain) Daniel Vasquez	TKO (Punches)	2	4:18	
Welterweight 83 kg	(Russia) Boris Medvedev	def.	(Russia) Kirill Mazhara	KO (Head Kick)	2	1:33	
Heavyweight 120 kg	(Russia) Dmitry Novikov	def.	(Russia) Mikhail Makogon	Submission (Rear-Naked Choke)	1	4:03	

== M-1 Challenge 90 - Kunchenko vs. Butenko ==
M-1 Challenge 90 - Kunchenko vs. Butenko
- Promotion: M-1 Global
- Date: March 30, 2018
- Venue: M-1 Arena
- City: Saint Petersburg, Russia

M-1 Challenge 90 - Kunchenko vs. Butenko was a mixed martial arts event held by M-1 Global on March 30, 2018 at the M-1 Arena in Saint Petersburg, Russia.

=== Results ===
M-1 Challenge 90
Weight Class				Method	Round	Time	Notes
Welterweight 77 kg	(Russia) Alexey Kunchenko (c)	def.	(Ukraine) Alexander Butenko	TKO (Knees)	3	4:04	For the M-1 Welterweight Championship
Middleweight 84 kg	(United States) Joe Riggs		(Ukraine) Boris Polezhay	DRAW (Split)	3	5:00	
Flyweight 57 kg	(Brazil) Rafael Dias	def.	(Russia) Vadim Malygin	Submission (Arm-Triangle Choke)	2	4:39	
Catchweight 73.5 kg	(Russia) Magomedkamil Malikov	def.	(Austria) Sado Ucar	TKO (Punches)	2	0:30	
Middleweight 84 kg	(Russia) Oleg Olenichev	def.	(Brazil) Silmar Nunes	Decision (Unanimous)	3	5:00	
Preliminary Card
Lightweight 70 kg	(Russia) Roman Bogatov	def.	(Azerbaijan) Tahir Abdullaev	Submission (Arm-Triangle Choke)	2	1:21	
Light Heavyweight 93 kg	(France) Bakary El Anwar	def.	(Russia) Alexandr Popov	Submission (Heel Hook)	1	0:27	
Featherweight 66 kg	(France) Damien Peltier	def.	(Russia) Maxim Kuldashev	Submission (Triangle Choke)	2	4:55	
Catchweight 75 kg	(Russia) Kurban Taigibov	def.	(Russia) Lom-Ali Nalgiev	Decision (Unanimous)	3	5:00	
Catchweight 59 kg	(Kyrgyzstan) Nureles Aidarov	def.	(Russia) Oleg Lichkovakha	KO (Knee)	1	0:12	
Light Heavyweight 93 kg	(Russia) Dmitry Tebekin	def.	(Kyrgyzstan) Abylkasim Yakubov	Decision (Unanimous)	3	5:00	
Middleweight 84 kg	(Russia) Vladimir Trusov	def.	(Russia) Vyacheslav Babkin	Submission (Guillotine Choke)	1	2:48	
Welterweight 77 kg	(Russia) Movsar Bokov	def.	(Georgia (country)) Levan Solodovnik	Submission (Kneebar)	2	1:35	

== M-1 Challenge 91 - Swain vs. Nuertiebieke ==
M-1 Challenge 91 - Swain vs. Nuertiebieke
- Promotion: M-1 Global
- Date: May 12, 2018
- Venue: Nanshan Culture & Sports Center
- City: Shenzhen, China

M-1 Challenge 91 - Swain vs. Nuertiebieke was a mixed martial arts event held by M-1 Global on May 12, 2018 at the Nanshan Culture & Sports Center in Shenzhen, China.

=== Background ===
M-1 Challenge 91 was supposed to be held April 21 at M-1 Arena in Saint Petersburg, Russia and featured a M-1 Featherweight Championship. bout between the champion Khamzat Dalgiev and Nate Landwehr, but for unknown reasons the event was canceled the M-1 Challenge 91 event will now be held in Shenzhen, China. The fights from the card Saint Petersburg event will be rescheduled for the upcoming M-1 events.

Due to visa issues the fight for the undisputed flyweight title between the first M-1 Challenge flyweight champion Aleksander Doskalchuk and the interim champion Arman Ashimov was rescheduled for M-1 Challenge 92.

=== Results ===
M-1 Challenge 91
Weight Class				Method	Round	Time	Notes
Catchweight 67 kg	(United States) Daniel Swain	def.	(China) Musu Nuertiebieke	Submission (Kneebar)	1	1:04	
Middleweight 84 kg	(Russia) Mikhail Zayats	def.	(Brazil) Caio Magalhães	Decision (Unanimous)	3	5:00	
Lightweight 70 kg	(Brazil) Michel Silva	def.	(China) Bolin Li	Submission (Arm-Triangle Choke)	1	3:03	
Welterweight 77 kg	(China) Kurbanjiang Tuluosibake	def.	(United States) Robert Turnquest	Decision (Unanimous)	3	5:00	
Featherweight 66 kg	(Ukraine) Andrey Lezhnev	def.	(China) Asikerbai Jinensibieke	Submission (Rear-Naked Choke)	1	3:09	
Preliminary Card
Flyweight 57 kg	(Georgia (country)) Vazha Tsiptauri	def.	(China) Hui Liang	Submission (Guillotine Choke)	1	3:47	
Bantamweight 61 kg	(Russia) Selem Evloev	def.	(China) Xiaolong Wu	Submission (Rear-Naked Choke)	1	2:41	
Women's Flyweight 57 kg	(China) Qihui Yan	def.	(Ukraine) Olga Golinska	TKO (Punches)	1	3:33	
Light Heavyweight 93 kg	(Poland) Rafal Kijanczuk	def.	(England) Matt Clempner	KO (Punches)	1	0:14	
Bantamweight 61 kg	(China) Huoyixibai Chuhayifu	def.	(Finland) Janne Elonen-Kulmala	Decision (Unanimous)	3	5:00	

== M-1 Challenge 92 - Kharitonov vs. Vyazigin ==
M-1 Challenge 92 - Kharitonov vs. Vyazigin
- Promotion: M-1 Global
- Date: May 24, 2018
- Venue: M-1 Arena
- City: Saint Petersburg, Russia

M-1 Challenge 92 - Kharitonov vs. Vyazigin was a mixed martial arts event held by M-1 Global on May 24, 2018 at the M-1 Arena in Saint Petersburg, Russia.

=== Background ===
Kharitonov win over Vyazigin at M-1 Challenge 95 declared no-contest after the commission gathered by the M-1 Global president Vadim Finkelchtein made the decision to change the result.

Busurmankul Abdibait Uulu was injured and was replaced by his fellow countryman Aziz Satybaldiev in the fight against Saba Bolaghi

Bair Shtepin was injured and was replaced by Ukrainian Ludwig Sholinyan in the fight against Alexander Osetrov.

=== Results ===
M-1 Challenge 92
Weight Class				Method	Round	Time	Notes
Heavyweight 120 kg	(Russia) Sergei Kharitonov	vs.	(Russia) Anton Vyazigin	No Contest	3	0:41	
Flyweight 57 kg	(Ukraine) Aleksander Doskalchuk (c)	def.	(Kazakhstan) Arman Ashimov (ic)	TKO (Hand Injury)	3	5:00	For the Unification of M-1 Flyweight Championship
Weltereight 77 kg	(Brazil) Tiago Varejão	def.	(Russia) Sergey Romanov	Decision (Majority)	3	5:00	
Light Heavyweight 93 kg	(Russia) Khadis Ibragimov	def.	(Georgia (country)) Giga Kukhalashvili	DQ (Holding the Ropes)	3	3:27	
Lightweight 70 kg	(Russia) Pavel Gordeev	def.	(France) Mickaël Lebout	Decision (Split)	3	5:00	
Preliminary Card
Welterweight 77 kg	(Russia) Daniil Prikaza	def.	(Brazil) Joilton Santos	Decision (Unanimous)	3	5:00	
Lightweight 70 kg	(Russia) Aleksey Ilyenko	def.	(Angola) Helson Henriques	KO (Knee and Punches)	3	0:27	
Heavyweight 120 kg	(Russia) Maksim Baruzdin	def.	(Cuba) Freddi Gonzalez	TKO (Punches)	1	0:18	
Featherweight 66 kg	(Germany) Saba Bolaghi	def.	(Kyrgyzstan) Busurmankul Abdibaitov	DQ (Soccer Kick)	2	1:26	
Featherweight 66 kg	(Russia) Mikhail Kuznetsov	def.	(Russia) Nikita Solonin	Submission (Guillotine Choke)	2	4:20	
Bantamweight 61 kg	(Ukraine) Ludwig Sholinyan	vs.	(Russia) Aleksandr Osetrov	DRAW	3	5:00	
Middleweight 84 kg	(Russia) Ruslan Shamilov	def.	(Russia) Denis Tiuliulin	Decision (Split)	3	5:00	
Welterweight 77 kg	(Georgia (country)) Amiran Gogoladze	def.	(Russia) Taymuraz Guriev	Decision (Split)	3	5:00	

== M-1 Challenge 93 - Shlemenko vs. Silva ==
M-1 Challenge 93 - Shlemenko vs. Silva
- Promotion: M-1 Global
- Date: June 1, 2018
- Venue: Traktor Ice Arena
- City: Chelyabinsk, Russia

M-1 Challenge 93 - Shlemenko vs. Silva was a mixed martial arts event held by M-1 Global on June 1, 2018 at the Traktor Ice Arena in Chelyabinsk, Russia.

=== Background ===
This event has featured a middleweight superfight between the former Bellator Middleweight Champion and Bruno Silva as M-1 Challenge 93 headliner and a Middleweight pairing the champion Artem Frolov and Joe Riggs for the M-1 Middleweight Championship as co-headliner.

=== Results ===
M-1 Challenge 93
Weight Class				Method	Round	Time	Notes
Middleweight 84 kg	(Brazil) Bruno Silva	def.	(Russia) Alexander Shlemenko	KO (Punches)	1	2:54	
Middleweight 84 kg	(Russia) Artem Frolov (c)	def.	(United States) Joe Riggs	TKO (Knee Injury)	2	0:46	For the M-1 Middleweight Championship
Lightweight 70 kg	(Russia) Alexey Makhno	def.	(Brazil) Rogerio Matias Da Conceicao	Decision (Unanimous)	3	5:00	
Flyweight 57 kg	(Ukraine) Alexander Pletenko	def.	(Canada) Chris Kelades	Decision (Unanimous)	3	5:00	
Lightweight 70 kg	(Finland) Mikal Silander	def.	(Kyrgyzstan) Nureles Aidarov	Submission (D'Arce Choke)	1	4:26	
Preliminary Card
Bantamweight 61 kg	(Russia) Sergey Klyuev	def.	(Russia) Ilya Karetnikov	Submission (Reverse Triangle Kimura)	1	2:25	
Middleweight 84 kg	(South Africa) Mark Hulme	def.	(Ukraine) Vadim Shabadash	Submission (Rear-Naked Choke)	1	2:20	
Flyweight 57 kg	(France) Pierre Ludet	def.	(Russia) Egor Filidov	Submission (Rear-Naked Choke)	1	3:56	
Heavyweight 120 kg	(Russia) Nikolay Savilov	def.	(Russia) Nikolai Rachek	TKO (Punches)	3	4:26	
Heavyweight 120 kg	(Russia) Yuriy Fedorov	def.	(France) Charles-Henri Lucien	TKO (Punches)	1	1:31	
Lightweight 70 kg	(Russia) Magomed Magomedov	def.	(Russia) Nikita Podkovalnikov	Decision (Unanimous)	3	5:00	
Middleweight 84 kg	(Russia) Vladimir Migovich	def.	(Russia) Nikita Novikov	Decision (Unanimous)	3	5:00	

== M-1 Challenge 94 - Damkovsky vs. Ismagulov ==
M-1 Challenge 94 - Damkovsky vs. Ismagulov
- Promotion: M-1 Global
- Date: June 15, 2018
- Venue: Sports Complex "Orenburg"
- City: Orenburg, Russia

M-1 Challenge 94 - Damkovsky vs. Ismagulov was a mixed martial arts event held by M-1 Global on June 15, 2018 at the Traktor Ice Arena in Orenburg, Russia.

=== Results ===
M-1 Challenge 94
Weight Class				Method	Round	Time	Notes
Lightweight 70 kg	(Kazakhstan) Damir Ismagulov (c)	def.	(Belarus) Artiom Damkovsky	TKO (Arm Injury)	1	3:53	For the M-1 Lightweight Championship
Lightweight 70 kg	(Russia) Roman Bogatov	def.	(Georgia (country)) Raul Tutarauli	Submission (Von Flue choke)	2	3:05	
Middleweight 84 kg	(Russia) Valery Myasnikov	def.	(Russia) Mikhail Ragozin	Decision (Majority)	3	5:00	
Lightweight 70 kg	(Brazil) Rubenilton Pereira	def.	(Kyrgyzstan) Baktybek Uulu Oktom	TKO (Eye Injury)	1	5:00	
Welterweight 77 kg	(Russia) Maksim Grabovich	def.	(Finland) Juho Valamaa	Decision (Unanimous)	3	5:00	
Preliminary Card
Heavyweight 120 kg	(Russia) Maksim Yakobyuk	def.	(Brazil) Marcus Vinicius Lopes	KO/TKO (punches)	2	4:52	
Women's Flyweight 57 kg	(Russia) Asia Klyutova	def.	(Bosnia and Herzegovina) Zejna Krantic	KO/TKO (punches)	3	4:22	
Flyweight 57 kg	(Belarus) Kiril Fomenkov	def.	(Bulgaria) Dimitar Kostov	Submission (choke)	1	2:40	
Middleweight 84 kg	(Russia) Vladimir Trusov	def.	(Greece) Leonardo Sinis	Decision (Unanimous)	3	5:00	
Featherweight 77 kg	(France) Souk Khampasath	def.	(Armenia) Gegham Vardanyan	Submission (choke)	1	3:08	

== M-1 Challenge 95 - Battle in the Mountains 7 ==
M-1 Challenge 95 - Battle in the Mountains 7
- Promotion: M-1 Global
- Date: July 21, 2018
- Venue: The Mountain
- City: Nazran, Russia

M-1 Challenge 95 - Battle in the Mountains 7 was a mixed martial arts event held by M-1 Global on July 21, 2018 at The Mountain in Nazran, Russia.

=== Background ===
Alexander Lunga was injured and was replaced by Zaka Fatullazade in the bantamweight bout against Sergey Morozov.

Abubakar Mestoev was injured and was replaced by his fellow countryman Khamzat Aushev in the catchweight bout against Jorge Rodrigues Silva.

=== Results ===
M-1 Challenge 95
Weight Class				Method	Round	Time	Notes
Featherweight 66 kg	(United States) Nate Landwehr	def.	(Russia) Khamzat Dalgiev (c)	TKO (Punches)	2	4:35	For the M-1 Featherweight Championship.
Bantamweight 61 kg	(Russia) Movsar Evloev (c)	def.	(Brazil) Rafael Dias	KO (Punches)	5	0:21	For the M-1 Bantamweight Championship.
Catchweight 72 kg	(Russia) Khamzat Aushev	def.	(Brazil) Jorge Rodrigues Silva	Submission (Rear-Naked Choke)	1	3:02	
Heavyweight 120 kg	(Azerbaijan) Zaur Gadzhibabayev	def.	(Ukraine) Yuriy Protzenko	Decision (Unanimous)	3	5:00	
Catchweight 72 kg	(Russia) Magomedkamil Malikov	def.	(Brazil) Eduardo Costa	Decision (Unanimous)	3	5:00	
Preliminary Card
Featherweight 66 kg	(Russia) Zalimbeg Omarov	def.	(Russia) Alexei Nevzorov	Decision (Unanimous)	3	5:00	
Bantamweight 61 kg	(Kazakhstan) Sergey Morozov	def.	(Azerbaijan) Zaka Fatullazade	TKO (Punches)	1	4:31	
Bantamweight 61 kg	(United States) Edward Massey	def.	(Georgia (country)) Mate Sanikidze	KO (Head Kick)	1	0:18	
Welterweight 77 kg	(Russia) Movsar Bokov	def.	(Kyrgyzstan) Belek Abdyzhaparov	Decision (Majority)	3	5:00	
Pre Undercard
Lightweight 70 kg	(Russia) Tamerlan Ozdoev	def.	(Austria) Sado Ucar	TKO (Punches)	1	3:36	
Featherweight 66 kg	(Russia) Musa Khamkhoev	def.	(Russia) Aleksandr Kutafin	Decision (Unanimous)	3	5:00	
Middleweight 84 kg	(Russia) Bekhan Mankiev	def.	(Kazakhstan) Mikhail Akilov	Submission (Armbar)	1	4:50	

== M-1 Challenge 96 - Mikutsa vs. Ibragimov ==
M-1 Challenge 96 - Mikutsa vs. Ibragimov
- Promotion: M-1 Global
- Date: August 25, 2018
- Venue: M-1 Arena
- City: Saint Petersburg, Russia

M-1 Challenge 96 - Mikutsa vs. Ibragimov was a mixed martial arts event held by M-1 Global on August 25, 2018 at the M-1 Arena in Saint Petersburg, Russia.

=== Background ===
Maksim Grabovich was scheduled to face Ruslan Rakhmonkulov at this event. However, Rakhmonkulov missed weight by over eight pounds and the bout was canceled.

Maksim Melnik was injured, Dmitriy Tikhonyuk steps in to replace Melnik against Boris Medvedev.

=== Results ===
M-1 Challenge 96
Weight Class				Method	Round	Time	Notes
Light Heavyweight 93 kg	(Russia) Khadis Ibragimov	def.	(Ukraine) Dimitriy Mikutsa	Submission (Rear-Naked Choke)	2	4:30	For the Vacant M-1 Light Heavyweight Championship.
Featherweight 66 kg	(Russia) Viktor Kolesnik	def.	(United States) Daniel Swain	TKO (Leg Kicks)	2	4:21	
Lightweight 70 kg	(Brazil) Michel Silva	def.	(Russia) Aleksey Ilyenko	TKO (Punches)	1	1:34	
Featherweight 66 kg	(Ukraine) Yuriy Chobuka	def.	(France) Steve Polifonte	Decision (Unanimous)	3	5:00	
Catchweight 59 kg	(Georgia (country)) Vazha Tsiptauri	def.	(Kazakhstan) Sanzhar Adilov	Decision (Unanimous)	3	5:00	
Preliminary Card
Welterweight 77 kg	(Russia) Boris Medvedev	def.	(Ukraine) Dmitriy Tikhonyuk	KO (Punch)	1	1:07	
Lightweight 70 kg	(Russia) Artem Tarasov	def.	(Czech Republic) Filip Kovařík	TKO(Punches)	1	1:57	
Light Heavyweight 93 kg	(Poland) Rafał Kijańczuk	def.	(Russia) Ibrahim Sagov	TKO (Leg Injury)	1	5:00	
Featherweight 66 kg	(Russia) Nikita Solonin	def.	(Austria) René Hackl	Decision (Unanimous)	3	5:00	
Catchweight 72 kg	(Russia) Vasily Kozlov	def.	(Poland) Jurand Lisiecki	KO (Punch)	1	0:42	
Pre Undercard
Heavyweight 120 kg	(Russia) Sergey Goltsov	def.	(Russia) Yuriy Fedorov	TKO (Punches)	3	1:10	
Featherweight 66 kg	(Russia) Akhmadkhan Bokov	def.	(Czech Republic) Adam Borovec	Decision (Unanimous)	3	5:00	

== M-1 Challenge 97 - Bogatov vs. Pereira ==
M-1 Challenge 97 - Bogatov vs. Pereira
- Promotion: M-1 Global
- Date: September 28, 2018
- Venue: Basket-Hall Arena
- City: Kazan, Russia

M-1 Challenge 97 - Bogatov vs. Pereira was a mixed martial arts event held by M-1 Global on September 28, 2018 at the Basket-Hall Arena in Kazan, Russia.

=== Fight Card ===
M-1 Challenge 97
Weight Class				Method	Round	Time	Notes
Lightweight 70 kg	(Russia) Roman Bogatov	def.	(Brazil) Rubenilton Pereira	Decision (Unanimous)	5	5:00	For the Vacant M-1 Lightweight Championship.
Middleweight 84 kg	(Spain) Enoc Solves Torres	def.	(Russia) Ruslan Shamilov	Decision (Unanimous)	3	5:00	
Welterweight 77 kg	(Russia) Maksim Grabovich	def.	(Brazil) Tiago Varejão	Decision (Split)	3	5:00	
Lightweight 70 kg	(France) Mickaël Lebout	def.	(Russia) Alexey Makhno	Decision (Unanimous)	3	5:00	
Lightweight 70 kg	(Russia) Pavel Gordeev	def.	(Russia) Alik Albogachiev	Decision (Split)	3	5:00	
Preliminary Card
Welterweight 77 kg	(Canada) Spencer Jebb	def.	(Russia) Vladimir Tyurin	Decision (Unanimous)	3	5:00	
Featherweight 66 kg	(Russia) Timur Doronin	def.	(China) Fu Kang Kang	Submission (Rear-Naked Choke)	2	3:06	
Bantamweight 61 kg	(Canada) Chris Kelades	def.	(Russia) Sergey Klyuev	Decision (Unanimous)	3	5:00	
Lightweight 70 kg	(Finland) Jani Salmi	def.	(Russia) Ruslan Khisamutdinov	Submission (Rear-Naked Choke)	1	3:52	
Bantamweight 61 kg	(Russia) Ivan Eremenko	def.	(Russia) Nidzhat Imanov	Decision (Majority)	3	5:00	
Heavyweight 120 kg	(Russia) Nikolai Rachek	def.	(Northern Ireland) Mindaugas Gerve	KO (Punches)	1	4:28	
Middleweight 84 kg	(Russia) Denis Tiuliulin	def.	(Russia) Nikita Shamov	KO (Knee)	1	2:56	
Welterweight 77 kg	(Azerbaijan) Gadzhibaba Gadzhibabaev	def.	(Russia) Zakhar Popel	TKO (Punches)	1	3:20	

== M-1 Challenge 98 - Frolov vs. Silva ==
M-1 Challenge 98 - Frolov vs. Silva
- Promotion: M-1 Global
- Date: November 2, 2018
- City: Chelyabinsk, Russia

M-1 Challenge 98 - Frolov vs. Silva was a mixed martial arts event held by M-1 Global on November 2, 2018 in Chelyabinsk, Russia.

=== Fight Card ===
M-1 Challenge 98
Weight Class				Method	Round	Time	Notes
Middleweight 84 kg	(Brazil) Bruno Silva	def.	(Russia) Artem Frolov (c)	TKO (Punches)	4	3:36	For the M-1 Middleweight Championship.
Welterweight 77 kg	(Russia) Sergey Romanov	def.	(Switzerland) Pablo Ortmann	Decision (Unanimous)	3	5:00	
Bantamweight 61 kg	(Kazakhstan) Sergey Morozov	def.	(Russia) Bair Shtepin	Decision (Unanimous)	3	5:00	
Middleweight 84 kg	(Russia) Ivan Bogdanov	def.	(France) Emmanuel Dawa	TKO (Punches)	3	0:58	
Welterweight 77 kg	(Russia) Boris Medvedev	def.	(Russia) David Zakaryan	Technical Submission (Rear-Naked Choke)	1	3:55	
Preliminary Card
Middleweight 84 kg	(Russia) Oleg Popov	def.	(Russia) Yuriy Fedorov	TKO (Punches)	2	2:38	
Welterweight 77 kg	(Brazil) Jean Patrick	def.	(Azerbaijan) Talekh Nadzhafadze	Submission (North-South Choke)	2	4:55|	
Bantamweight 61 kg	(Russia) Magomed Magomedov	def.	(France) Arnaud Kherfallah	KO (Punches)	1	0:28	
Middleweight 84 kg	(Russia) Ivan Tsigelnik	def.	(Russia) Maksim Baruzdin	TKO (Punches)	1	0:20	
Welterweight 77 kg	(Russia) Denis Sulimov	def.	(Russia) Iliskhan Merzhoev	TKO (Punches)	1	4:27	
Middleweight 84 kg	(Russia) Rizvan Simbagaev	def.	(Ukraine) Aleksey Shanin	TKO (Punches)	3	2:40	
Welterweight 77 kg	(Russia) Nikita Barkhatov	def.	(Spain) Agoney Romero	KO (Punch)	1	3:55	

== M-1 Challenge 99: Battle Of Narts 4 ==
M-1 Challenge 99: Battle Of Narts 4
- Promotion: M-1 Global
- Date: November 17, 2018
- City: Nazran, Russia

M-1 Challenge 99: Battle Of Narts 4 was a mixed martial arts event held by M-1 Global on November 17, 2018 in Nazran, Russia.

=== Fight Card ===
M-1 Challenge 98
Weight Class				Method	Round	Time	Notes
Flyweight 57 kg	(Ukraine) Aleksander Doskalchuk (c)	def.	(Finland) Mikael Silander	Decision (Unanimous)	5	5:00	For the M-1 Flyweight Championship.
Heavyweight 120 kg	(Brazil) Klidson Abreu	def.	(Russia) Anton Vyazigin	Submission (Straight Armbar)	2	3:16	
Featherweight 66 kg	(Russia) Abubakar Mestoev	def.	(Brazil) Junior Maranhão	Decision (Unanimous)	3	5:00	
Bantamweight 61 kg	(Russia) Aleksandr Osetrov	def.	(Russia) Selem Evloev	Decision (Majority)	3	5:00	
Lightweight 70 kg	(Brazil) Michel Silva	def.	(Russia) Magomedkamil Malikov	Submission (Brabo Choke)	2	1:17	
Middleweight 84 kg	(Ukraine) Vadim Shabadash	def.	(Russia) Musa Pliev	Submission (Rear-Naked Choke)	1	3:12	
Featherweight 66 kg	(Kyrgyzstan) Busurmankul Abdibait Uulu	def.	(Russia) Zalimbeg Omarov	Decision (Majority)	3	5:00	
Featherweight 66 kg	(Spain) Aridane Romero Rodriguez	def.	(Russia) Akhmadkhan Bokov	Submission (Triangle Choke)	2	2:28	
Welterweight 77 kg	(Georgia (country)) Amiran Gogoladze	def.	(Finland) Juho Valamaa	KO (Punch)	1	0:10	
Middleweight 84 kg	(Russia) Vladimir Trusov	def.	(Russia) Aslan Izmaylov	TKO (Submission to Punches)	3	2:50	
Catchweight 73 kg	(Russia) Lom-Ali Nalgiev	def.	(Kyrgyzstan) Tursunbek Asylgaziev	Decision (Unanimous)	3	5:00	
Featherweight 66 kg	(Russia) Gleb Khabibulin	def.	(Russia) Amir Badiev	KO (Punch)	1	2:14	

== M-1 Challenge 100 - Battle in Atyrau ==
M-1 Challenge 100: Battle in Atyrau
- Promotion: M-1 Global
- Date: December 15, 2018
- City: Atyrau, Kazakhstan

M-1 Challenge 100: Battle in Atyrau was a mixed martial arts event held by M-1 Global on December 15, 2018 in Atyrau, Kazakhstan.

=== Fight Card ===
M-1 Challenge 98
Weight Class				Method	Round	Time	Notes
Featherweight 66 kg	(United States) Nate Landwehr (c)	def.	(Ukraine) Andrey Lezhnev	TKO (Punches)	3	3:10	For the M-1 Featherweight Championship.
Bantamweight 61 kg	(Kazakhstan) Sergey Morozov	def.	(Kyrgyzstan) Bakhytbek Duishobaev	KO (Punches)	1	4:15	
Welterweight 77 kg	(Russia) Daniil Prikaza	def.	(Brazil) Eduardo Ramon	TKO (Punches)	2	4:06	
Flyweight 57 kg	(Brazil) Kayck Alencar	def.	(Kazakhstan) Talgat Zhumagaliev	Submission	2	2:33	
Catchweight 94 kg	(Poland) Rafał Kijańczuk	def.	(Georgia (country)) Giga Kukhalashvili	TKO (Punches)	1	2:42	
Preliminary Card
Middleweight 84 kg	(Kazakhstan) Murad Abdurakhmanov	def.	(United States) Brandon Bell	TKO (Punches)	3	0:10	
Lightweight 70 kg	(Russia) Khamzat Dalgiev	def.	(Kyrgyzstan) Bayaman Nurmamat	TKO (Punches)	1	4:40	
Featherweight 66 kg	(Russia) Mikhail Kuznetsov	def.	(Kazakhstan) Nurbek Kabdrakhmanov	Decision (Unanimous)	3	5:00	
Catchweight 63 kg	(Kazakhstan) Abylai Tolesh	def.	(Russia) Sergey Klyuev	TKO (Punches)	3	3:06	
Flyweight 57 kg	(Kazakhstan) Asu Almabayev	def.	(Russia) Kiril Fomenkov	Submission (Rear-Naked Choke)	2	3:51	
Lightweight 70 kg	(Russia) Vasily Kozlov	def.	(Georgia (country)) Georgiy Akoshvili	KO (Punches)	3	4:55	
Featherweight 66 kg	(Kazakhstan) Sabit Zhusupov	def.	(Georgia (country)) Mate Sanikidze	Decision (Unanimous)	3	5:00	
