= Carlos Eduardo (fighter) =

Brazilian mixed martial artist (born 1981)

- Born: December 9, 1981 (age 44); Fortaleza, Ceará, Brazil
- Other names: Cachorrão ("Big Dog")
- Height: 6 ft 2 in (188 cm)
- Weight: 205 lb (93 kg; 14 st 9 lb)
- Division: Heavyweight; Light Heavyweight; Middleweight
- Reach: 74 in (188 cm)
- Style: Brazilian Jiu-Jitsu
- Stance: Orthodox
- Fighting out of: Fortaleza, Ceará, Brazil
- Team: Dragon Fight; Nova União
- Rank: Black belt in Brazilian Jiu-Jitsu
- Years active: 2003–2023

Mixed martial arts record
- Total: 31
- Wins: 20
- By knockout: 7
- By submission: 9
- By decision: 4
- Losses: 11
- By knockout: 4
- By decision: 6
- By disqualification: 1

Other information
- Mixed martial arts record from Sherdog

Carlos Eduardo (born December 9, 1981) is a Brazilian mixed martial artist currently competing in the Heavyweight division. A professional competitor since 2003, he has competed for Bellator, M-1 Global, and Absolute Championship Akhmat.

== Mixed martial arts career ==
=== Early career ===
Eduardo started his professional career in 2003. Initially, he fought twice in the Brazilian circuit, becoming inactive in 2005 and 2006. In 2007 he came back, alternating fights in American promotions as Extreme Challenge and Battle Cage Xtreme, and Brazilian promotions as Amazon Fight and Nocaute Fight Combat.

He faced opponents like the then prospect and future UFC champion Jon Jones, and the once Brazilian jiu-jitsu world champion Erick Wanderley.

=== Shooto Brazil ===
Eduardo won the Shooto light heavyweight title on April 26, 2012 at Shooto Brazil 29 against Marcos Rogério de Lima. He won the fight via knockout early in the second round.

He defended his title once, on July 12, 2013 at Shooto Brazil 41 against Marcus Vinícius Lopes. He defeated Lopes via unanimous decision after three rounds.

=== Bellator MMA ===
Eduardo made his promotional debut on October 11, 2013 at Bellator 103 against Wayman Carter. He won via submission due to a rear-naked choke in the very first round.

Eduardo faced UFC veteran Rodney Wallace on April 11, 2014 at Bellator 116. Eduardo lost via unanimous decision (30–27, 30–27, and 29–28).

Eduardo faced Egidijus Valavičius in the quarterfinal match of Bellator 2014 summer series light heavyweight tournament on June 6, 2014 at Bellator 121. Valavičius defeated Eduardo via split decision.

On June 25, 2014, Eduardo was released from the promotion, along with 18 other fighters.

=== Difficulties and return to MMA ===
In 2014, after losing two straight in Bellator, Eduardo was disconnected from the organization and eventually lost his sponsorships.

With this Cachorrão was forced to take a break in his MMA career and returned to give jiu-jitsu classes and also to compete in the gentle art.

After little more than a year, Eduardo back to MMA in the main event of an 1 Round Combat in his hometown and wins by submission in the second round athlete Kleber Silva, Luiz Carlos Dorea pupil.

=== Return to Shooto Brazil ===
Eduardo returned to Shooto on April 2, 2016 at Shooto Brazil 62 to face Cássio Barbosa "Jacaré" for the vacant title of the light heavyweight division. However "Jacaré" left the event to fight in a Russian event and was replaced hastily by Willyanedson Paiva. He won by submission (armlock) in the very first round to again become the champion of Shooto Brazil.

=== Absolute Championship Berkut ===
Eduardo made his ACA debut against Fábio Silva at ACB 73: Silva vs. Makoev on October 21, 2017. He won the bout via split decision.

Eduardo faced Daniel Sarafian at ACB 82: Silva vs. Kolobegov on March 9, 2018. He lost the but via unanimous decision.

Eduardo faced Sami Antar at ACA 96: Goncharov vs. Johnson on June 8, 2019. He won the bout via TKO (punches) in the second round.

Eduardo faced Isa Umarov at ACA 102: Tumenov vs. Ushukov on November 29, 2019. He won the bout via first round rear-naked submission.

Eduardo faced Muslim Magomedov at ACA 105: Shakhbulatov vs. Oliveira on March 6, 2020. He lost the bout after being unable to continue due to a leg injury in the third round.

Eduardo faced Cory Hendricks at ACA 114: Omielańczuk vs. Johnson on November 26, 2020. He lost the bout via unanimous decision.

Eduardo faced Goran Reljić on April 23, 2021 at ACA 122. He lost the bout via split decision.

Eduardo faced Oleg Olenyechev on June 29, 2021 at ACA 125. He lost the bout via split decision.

Eduardo faced Adlan Ibragimov at ACA 135 on January 28, 2022. Eduardo lost the bout after it was stopped after the first round due to a cut.

=== Post ACA ===
Eduardo faced Benjamin Šehić on July 23, 2022 at Serbian Battle Championship 43. He won the bout via TKO stoppage at the end of the third round.

== Championships and accomplishments ==
=== Mixed martial arts ===
- Shooto Brazil
  - Shooto Brazil Light Heavyweight Championship (Two times)
    - One successful title defense

== Mixed martial arts record ==
Professional record breakdown
31 matches	20 wins	11 losses
By knockout	7	4
By submission	9	0
By decision	4	6
By disqualification	0	1

Res.	Record	Opponent	Method	Event	Date	Round	Time	Location	Notes
Loss	20–11	Bogdan Guskov	TKO (punches)	MMA Series 64 - Dyakonov vs. Solorzano	March 18, 2023	1	0:25	Hurghada, Egypt	Return to Light Heavyweight.
Win	20–10	Benjamin Šehić	KO (punch)	Serbian Battle Championship 43	July 23, 2022	2	4:24	Secanj, Serbia	
Loss	19–10	Adlan Ibragimov	TKO (doctor stoppage)	ACA 135: Gasanov vs. Dzhanaev	January 28, 2022	1	5:00	Grozny, Russia	Heavyweight debut.
Loss	19–9	Oleg Olenyechev	Decision (split)	ACA 125: Dudaev vs. de Lima	June 29, 2021	3	5:00	Sochi, Russia	Light Heavyweight bout.
Loss	19–8	Goran Reljić	Decision (split)	ACA 122: Johnson vs. Poberezhets	April 23, 2021	3	5:00	Minsk, Belarus	Middleweight debut.
Loss	19–7	Cory Hendricks	Decision (unanimous)	ACA 114: Omielańczuk vs. Johnson	November 26, 2020	3	5:00	Łódź, Poland	Catchweight (210 lbs) bout.
Loss	19–6	Muslim Magomedov	TKO (leg injury)	ACA 105: Shakhbulatov vs. Oliveira	March 6, 2020	3	0:48	Almaty, Kazakhstan	
Win	19–5	Isa Umarov	Submission (rear-naked choke)	ACA 102: Tumenov vs. Ushukov	November 29, 2019	1	2:35	Almaty, Kazakhstan	
Win	18–5	Sami Antar	TKO (punches)	ACA 96: Goncharov vs. Johnson	June 8, 2019	2	1:20	Łódź, Poland	
Loss	17–5	Daniel Sarafian	Decision (unanimous)	ACB 82: Silva vs. Kolobegov	March 9, 2018	3	5:00	São Paulo, Brazil	
Win	17–4	Fábio Silva	Decision (split)	ACB 73: Silva vs. Makoev	October 21, 2017	3	5:00	Rio de Janeiro, Brazil	
Win	16–4	Rene Hoppe	TKO (corner stoppage)	M-1 Challenge 80: Kharitonov vs. Sokoudjou	June 15, 2017	1	1:06	Harbin, Heilongjiang, China	
Win	15–4	Boris Polejay	Decision (unanimous)	M-1 Challenge 75: Shlemenko vs. Bradley	3 March 2017	3	5:00	Moscow, Russia	
Win	14–4	Julio Juarez Vieira	Submission (rear-naked choke)	1° Round Combat 3	December 12, 2016	1	0:59	Sao Benedito, Brazil	
Win	13–4	Willyanedson Paiva	Submission (armbar)	Shooto Brazil 62	April 2, 2016	1	2:55	Recife, Brazil	Won vacant Shooto Brazil Light Heavyweight Championship.
Win	12–4	Kleber Silva	Submission (americana)	1° Round Combat 1	December 6, 2015	2	4:05	Fortaleza, Ceará, Brazil	
Loss	11–4	Egidijus Valavičius	Decision (split)	Bellator 121	June 6, 2014	3	5:00	Thackerville, Oklahoma, United States	Bellator 2014 Summer Series Light Heavyweight Tournament Quarterfinal.
Loss	11–3	Rodney Wallace	Decision (unanimous)	Bellator 116	April 11, 2014	3	5:00	Temecula, California, United States	
Win	11–2	Wayman Carter	Submission (rear-naked choke)	Bellator 103	October 11, 2013	1	2:06	Wichita, Kansas, United States	
Win	10–2	Marcus Vinícius Lopes	Decision (unanimous)	Shooto Brazil 41	July 12, 2013	3	5:00	Brasília, Brazil	Won the vacant Shooto Brazil Light Heavyweight Championship.
Win	9–2	Marcos Rogério de Lima	KO (punches)	Shooto Brazil 29	April 26, 2012	2	0:17	Rio de Janeiro, Brazil	
Win	8–2	Angel Orellana	TKO (retirement)	Shooto Brazil 28	March 10, 2012	2	5:00	Rio de Janeiro, Brazil	
Win	7–2	Raul Jimenez	Submission (rear-naked choke)	Kumite MMA Combate	October 28, 2011	1	2:24	Porto Alegre, Rio Grande do Sul, Brazil	
Win	6–2	Ubiratan Marinho Lima	Decision (unanimous)	Amazon Fight 9	September 15, 2011	3	5:00	Belém, Pará, Brazil	
Win	5–2	Erick Wanderley	TKO (punches)	International Fighter Championship	April 29, 2011	3	1:24	Recife, Pernambuco, Brazil	
Win	4–2	Ryan Contaldi	Submission (armbar)	Battle Cage Xtreme 5	July 12, 2008	1	1:24	Atlantic City, New Jersey, United States	
Win	3–2	Daniel Animal	Submission (armbar)	Nocaute Fight: MMA Edition 1	May 21, 2008	3	2:55	Fortaleza, Ceará, Brazil	
Loss	2–2	Jon Jones	KO (punch)	Battle Cage Xtreme 4	April 19, 2008	3	0:24	Atlantic City, New Jersey, United States	
Loss	2–1	Lewis Pascavage	DQ (illegal kick)	Extreme Challenge 78	June 9, 2007	1	0:58	Asbury Park, New Jersey, United States	
Win	2–0	Sergio Thomsem	Submission (armbar)	Shooto Brazil: New Generation	November 28, 2004	2	3:26	Curitiba, Paraná, Brazil	
Win	1–0	Magno Penha	TKO (punches)	K-1 Brazil: New Stars	November 27, 2003	2	3:12	Curitiba, Paraná, Brazil	Light Heavyweight debut.
