= Chris Kelades =

American mixed martial arts fighter

- Born: Chris Kelades; February 21, 1981 (age 45); Dartmouth, Nova Scotia, Canada
- Other names: The Greek Assassin
- Height: 5 ft 7 in (170 cm)
- Weight: 125.7 lb (57 kg; 9 st 0 lb)
- Division: Bantamweight (2009-2012), (2024); Flyweight (2014-2024)
- Reach: 68.0 in (173 cm)
- Fighting out of: Dartmouth, Nova Scotia, Canada
- Team: Halifax BJJ Society
- Rank: Black belt in Brazilian Jiu-Jitsu
- Years active: 2009–2024

Mixed martial arts record
- Total: 20
- Wins: 15
- By knockout: 2
- By submission: 4
- By decision: 9
- Losses: 5
- By submission: 1
- By decision: 4

Other information
- Mixed martial arts record from Sherdog
- Last updated on: February 29, 2020

Chris Kelades (born February 21, 1981) is a Canadian retired mixed martial artist and former interim M-1 Challenge Flyweight champion. He previously competed in the Flyweight division of the Ultimate Fighting Championship. A professional MMA competitor since 2009, Kelades made a name for himself fighting mostly in his native country. In 2014, he also fought for Bellator MMA, M-1 Global.

== Mixed martial arts career ==
=== Early career ===
Chris Kelades began training in Brazilian jiu-jitsu which led into training wrestling and striking. He currently holds a black belt in Brazilian Jiu-Jitsu. Chris would amass a 6–0 record before signing with Bellator, but would drop a decision for the promotion at Bellator 119. He would bounce back with a win in July 2014.

=== Ultimate Fighting Championship ===
After his win at Extreme Cage Combat 21 in July, Kelades signed with the UFC.

Kelades did his promotional debut on one week short notice replacing an injured Louis Gaudinot against Paddy Holohan on October 4, 2014, at UFC Fight Night: MacDonald vs. Saffiedine. Despite being a heavy underdog, Kelades won via unanimous decision. The fight earned the Fight of the Night bonus.

Kelades faced Ray Borg on February 14, 2015, at UFC Fight Night: Henderson vs. Thatch. Borg won the one sided fight via submission in the third round.

Kelades next faced Chris Beal on August 23, 2015, at UFC Fight Night 74. He won the fight via split decision.

Kelades faced Sergio Pettis on April 23, 2016, at UFC 197. He lost the fight by unanimous decision and was subsequently released from the promotion.

=== Post UFC Career ===
Kelades would head to Legacy Fighting Alliance to pick up a decision win against Tyler Shinn on August 4, 2017, before heading to compete in Russia for M-1 Global making his debut at M-1 Challenge 86 - Buchinger vs. Dalgiev against Oleg Lichkovakha, he won the fight due to submission via kimura in round 3.

On June 1, 2018, Kaledes fought Alexander Pletenko at M-1 Challenge 93 - Shlemenko vs. Silva, he would lose the fight via unanimous decision.

Kelades next faced Sergey Klyuev on September 28, 2018, in a Bantamweight contest at M-1 Challenge 97 - Bogatov vs. Pereira. He would win the fight via unanimous decision.

On August 3, 2019, Kelades rematched Alexander Pletenko for the interim M-1 Challenge Flyweight Championship at M-1 Challenge 103 - Pletenko vs. Kelades. Kelades would go on to win the fight via unanimous decision earning the M-1 Challenge Flyweight title.

Kelades would next face Asu Almabayev at M-1 Challenge 105 - Morozov vs. Rettinghouse on October 19, 2019. he would lose the bout via unanimous decision relinquishing the M-1 Challenge Flyweight title.

In early 2024, Kelades announced that he would be retiring from the sport after one last fight. It was later announced that his farewell bout would be taking place in Dartmouth, NS on June 8, 2024 at Fight League Atlantic 15 against fellow Maritime MMA fighter, Morgan Rhynes of PEI. In a back and forth fight, Kelades won via Split Decision.

== Mixed martial arts record ==
Professional record breakdown
20 matches	15 wins	5 losses
By knockout	2	0
By submission	4	1
By decision	9	4

Res.	Record	Opponent	Method	Event	Date	Round	Time	Location	Notes
Win	15–5	Morgan Rhynes	Decision (split)	Fight League Atlantic 15	June 8, 2024	3	5:00	Dartmouth, Nova Scotia, Canada	Bantamweight bout.
Loss	14–5	Asu Almabayev	Decision (unanimous)	M-1 Challenge 105	October 19, 2019	5	5:00	Nur-Sultan, Kazakhstan	Lost the interim M-1 Global Flyweight Championship.
Win	14–4	Alexander Pletenko	Decision (unanimous)	M-1 Challenge 103	August 3, 2019	5	5:00	Shenzhen, China	Return to Flyweight. Won the interim M-1 Global Flyweight Championship.
Win	13–4	Sergey Klyuev	Decision (unanimous)	M-1 Challenge 97	September 28, 2018	3	5:00	Kazan, Russia	Bantamweight debut.
Loss	12–4	Alexander Pletenko	Decision (unanimous)	M-1 Challenge 93	June 1, 2018	3	5:00	Chelyabinsk, Russia	
Win	12–3	Oleg Lichkovakha	Submission (kimura)	M-1 Challenge 86	November 24, 2017	3	1:38	Nazran, Russia	
Win	11–3	Keegan Oliver	Decision (unanimous)	Fight Night Medicine Hat 4	September 9, 2017	3	5:00	Medicine Hat, Alberta, Canada	
Win	10–3	Tyler Shinn	Decision (unanimous)	LFA 18	August 4, 2017	3	5:00	Shawnee, Oklahoma, United States	
Loss	9–3	Sergio Pettis	Decision (unanimous)	UFC 197	April 23, 2016	3	5:00	Las Vegas, Nevada, United States	
Win	9–2	Chris Beal	Decision (split)	UFC Fight Night: Holloway vs. Oliveira	August 23, 2015	3	5:00	Saskatoon, Saskatchewan, Canada	
Loss	8–2	Ray Borg	Submission (kimura)	UFC Fight Night: Henderson vs. Thatch	February 14, 2015	3	2:56	Broomfield, Colorado, United States	
Win	8–1	Paddy Holohan	Decision (unanimous)	UFC Fight Night: MacDonald vs. Saffiedine	October 4, 2014	3	5:00	Halifax, Nova Scotia, Canada	Fight of the Night.
Win	7–1	Adrian Woolley	Decision (split)	Extreme Cage Fighting 21	April 19, 2014	3	5:00	Halifax, Nova Scotia, Canada	
Loss	6–1	Malcolm Gordon	Decision (unanimous)	Bellator 119	May 9, 2014	3	5:00	Rama, Ontario, Canada	Catchweight (130 lb) bout.
Win	6–0	Rick Doyle	Submission (gogoplata)	Extreme Cage Fighting 19	January 25, 2014	1	2:44	Halifax, Nova Scotia, Canada	
Win	5–0	Dimitri Waanderburg	Decision (split)	Instinct Fighting 1	October 7, 2011	3	5:00	Boisbriand, Quebec, Canada	
Win	4–0	Chance Whalen	Submission (rear-naked choke)	East Coast Fight Productions: Resurgence	May 27, 2011	2	3:10	Trenton, Nova Scotia, Canada	
Win	3–0	Justin Steele	TKO (punches)	Extreme Cage Fighting 12	April 16, 2011	2	0:36	Halifax, Nova Scotia, Canada	
Win	2–0	Vincent Cormier	Submission (guillotine choke)	Friday Night Fights: Blacklash	July 9, 2010	2	4:01	Dartmouth, Nova Scotia, Canada	
Win	1–0	Jon Williams	TKO (punches)	Absolute Fighting Canada 3	May 9, 2009	2	3:17	Amherst, Nova Scotia, Canada	Flyweight debut.

== See also ==
- List of current UFC fighters
- List of male mixed martial artists
- List of Canadian UFC fighters
