= M-1 Global =

Mixed martial arts promotion

- Current season, competition or edition: 2020 in M-1 Global
- Sport: Mixed martial arts promotion
- Founded: 1997; 29 years ago
- Founder: Vadim Finkelchtein
- Owner: Private
- Headquarters: Saint Petersburg, Russia
- Website: http://www.m-1global.com

M-1 Global (Mixfight-1) or MMA-1 (Mixed martial arts-1) is a mixed martial arts promotion based in St. Petersburg, Russia founded by businessman Vadim Finkelchtein in 1997.

Originating from the Russian "mixfight" scene of the 1990s, M-1 grew from local tournament events into one of the most prominent MMA organizations in Russia and one of the better-known promotions outside the UFC and PRIDE during the 2000s.

The promotion became particularly associated with heavyweight Fedor Emelianenko, whose career was managed by Finkelchtein, and became notable for its willingness to cooperate with other major MMA organizations rather than operate solely as a competing promotion. Throughout its history, M-1 has co-promoted or collaborated with organizations including PRIDE, Affliction, Strikeforce and the UFC, while also developing its own international competition through the M-1 Challenge. M-1 has played a significant role in the development of Russian and Eastern European MMA, providing an early platform for numerous fighters who later competed at the highest level of the sport.

== History ==
M-1 traces its origins to the Russian "mixfight" (Russian nickname for early MMA, or vale tudo) scene of the mid-1990s, when businessman Vadim Finkelchtein became involved in the sport through his promotion of Red Devil Energy Drink. While looking to promote the new brand, Finkelchtein was approached by Dutch "mixed- fight" organizers and agreed to sponsor a tournament in the Netherlands; after attending the event and becoming impressed by the sport's appeal, he decided to bring mixed fighting to Russia. Working with figures from the emerging St. Petersburg fight scene, including Nikolai Kudryashov, Finkelchtein helped organize the first M-1 tournament at the Yubileyny Sports Palace in St. Petersburg on November 1, 1997. Billed as a European Championship in Mixfight, the event attracted more than 4,000 spectators at a time when mixed martial arts was still largely unknown in Russia and was commonly promoted as "mixfight" or "fights without rules". The success of the tournament led to the establishment of M-1 as a regular promotion and to the development of the Red Devil Sport Club, an MMA gym which became closely associated with the organization.

Following the inaugural tournament, M-1 gradually expanded its schedule and reach. Early events were concentrated in St. Petersburg and featured single-elimination tournament-style competitions, but the promotion began holding events elsewhere in Russia, including Sochi in 2000 and Moscow in 2003. During this period, M-1 also developed the Red Devil Sport Club into one of Russia's leading MMA teams, attracting fighters from across the country and establishing a close relationship between the promotion, its fighters, and Finkelchtein's management organization. The most important fighter to emerge from this system was Fedor Emelianenko, who began working with Finkelchtein in 2003 after establishing himself as a rising heavyweight in Russia. Fedor's subsequent success, particularly during his reign as PRIDE Heavyweight Champion, gave M-1 an international profile and helped establish the promotion as one of the leading organizations in Russian MMA.

Following PRIDE Fighting Championships's collapse in 2007, M-1 became involved in the transition of Japan's MMA scene through Yarennoka!, a New Year's Eve event held at Saitama Super Arena on December 31, 2007 and co-promoted by former PRIDE personnel and M-1 Global. Headlined by Fedor Emelianenko, who defeated Hong-Man Choi, the event effectively served as a PRIDE's farewell event and bridge between the PRIDE era and the emerging international MMA landscape. M-1's involvement also reflected its growing strategy of working across promotions to keep Fedor competing internationally, setting the stage for later partnerships with Affliction and other organizations.

=== M-1 Challenge ===
During the second half of the 2000s, M-1 increasingly pursued an international strategy. The organization promoted events outside Russia and sought to create a global network of fighters and teams, culminating in the launch of the M-1 Challenge in 2008. Unlike a conventional MMA league, the Challenge used national and regional teams competing against one another across a series of events, with fighters representing countries including Russia, the United States, the Netherlands, France, Finland, Japan, South Korea and others. The format helped M-1 build an international roster while providing a competitive pathway for emerging fighters.

Around the same period, M-1 became involved in one of the most significant attempts to challenge the UFC's dominance of the international MMA market through its partnership with Affliction Entertainment. Fedor Emelianenko headlined Affliction's first two major MMA events in 2008 and 2009, defeating Tim Sylvia and Andrei Arlovski respectively. Although Affliction ultimately abandoned MMA promotion in 2009, M-1 continued operating independently and increasingly established itself as a major European and Russian promotion.

M-1, in 2009, signed a contract to co-promote with Explosion Entertainment, owners of Strikeforce.

It hosted its first major show (rather than co-promoting with other organizations) entitled M-1 Global Presents Breakthrough on August 28, 2009 at Memorial Hall in Kansas City, Kansas.

=== M-1 Selection ===
The M-1 Selection is a MMA competition where the next generation of fighters are given the opportunity to showcase their skills on the world stage with fighters being eliminated after only one loss; victory will advance the winning fighters throughout the tournament and earn them a trip to the championship event where they will compete for a “M-1 Selection” title.

=== UFC Partnership ===
On July 18, 2018, it was announced that M-1 has agreed in a partnership with Ultimate Fighting Championship (UFC) where M-1 Global serves as the farm league for the UFC to scout Russian fighters for the UFC and involves in preparation and organizes new shows in Russia. Part of the deal also allows M-1 champions to have the opportunity to sign with the UFC.

== List of M-1 Global events ==
| No. | Event | Date | Venue | Location |
|---|---|---|---|---|
| 47 | M-1 Selection Online: Tournament in Support of Maksim Shugaley | September 11, 2020 | Tinkoff Arena | St. Petersburg, Russia |
| 46 | MMA SERIES-10: WKG & M-1 Online | July 18, 2020 | Tinkoff Arena | St. Petersburg, Russia |
| 45 | Road to M-1 USA 4 | January 31, 2020 | Charles F. Dodge City Center | Pembroke Pines, Florida, United States |
| 44 | M-1 Challenge 105 - Morozov vs. Rettinghouse | October 19, 2019 | Barys Arena | Nur-Sultan, Kazakhstan |
| 43 | Road To M-1 USA 3 | October 11, 2019 | Paducah Convention Center | Paducah, Kentucky, United States |
| 42 | M-1 Challenge 104 - Bogatov vs. Lebout | September 28, 2019 | Orenburzhye Sport Arena | Kazan, Russia |
| 41 | M-1 Challenge 103 - Pletenko vs. Kelades | August 3, 2019 | | Shenzhen, China |
| 40 | M-1 Challenge 102 - Rakhmonov vs. Lacerda | June 28, 2019 | Barys Arena | Nur-Sultan, Kazakhstan |
| 39 | Road To M-1 | April 6, 2019 | Chelyabinsk Palace Of Culture | Chelyabinsk, Russia |
| 38 | Road To M-1 USA 2 | April 4, 2019 | Quechan Casino Resort | Winterhaven, California, United States |
| 37 | M-1 Challenge 101 - Prikaza vs. Rakhmonov | March 30, 2019 | Halyk Arena | Almaty, Kazakhstan |
| 36 | M-1 Challenge/ WKG 3 - Bogatov vs. Silva | January 26, 2019 | Nanshan Culture & Sports Center | Harbin, China |
| 35 | M-1 Challenge 100 - Battle in Atyrau | December 15, 2018 | | Atyrau, Kazakhstan |
| 34 | M-1 Challenge 99 - Battle Of Narts 4 | November 17, 2018 | M1 Arena | Nazran, Russia |
| 33 | M-1 Challenge 98 - Frolov vs. Silva | November 2, 2018 | Traktor Ice Arena | Chelyabinsk, Russia |
| 32 | M-1 Challenge 97 - Bogatov vs. Pereira | September 28, 2018 | Basket-Hall Arena | Kazan, Russia |
| 31 | M-1 Challenge 96 - Mikutsa vs. Ibragimov | August 25, 2018 | M-1 Arena | Saint Petersburg, Russia |
| 30 | M-1 Challenge 95 - Battle in the Mountains 7 | July 21, 2018 | The Mountain | Nazran, Russia |
| 29 | M-1 Challenge 94 - Damkovsky vs. Ismagulov | June 15, 2018 | Sports Complex "Orenburg" | Orenburg, Russia |
| 28 | M-1 Challenge 93 - Shlemenko vs. Silva | June 1, 2018 | Traktor Ice Arena | Chelyabinsk, Russia |
| 27 | M-1 Challenge 92 - Kharitonov vs. Vyazigin | May 24, 2018 | M-1 Arena | Saint Petersburg, Russia |
| 26 | M-1 Challenge 91 - Swain vs. Nuertiebieke | May 12, 2018 | Nanshan Culture & Sports Center | Shenzhen, China |
| 25 | M-1 Challenge 90 - Kunchenko vs. Butenko | March 30, 2018 | M-1 Arena | Saint Petersburg, Russia |
| 24 | M-1 Challenge 89 - Buchinger vs. Krasnikov | March 10, 2018 | M-1 Arena | Saint Petersburg, Russia |
| 23 | M-1 Challenge 88 - Ismagulov vs. Tutarauli | February 22, 2018 | Olimpiyskiy | Moscow, Russia |
| 22 | M-1 Challenge 87 - Silander vs. Ashimov | February 9, 2018 | M1 Arena | Saint Petersburg, Russia |
| 21 | Road to M-1: Battle in Nazran 9 | December 16, 2017 | Sports Palace "Magas" | Nazran, Russia |
| 20 | M-1 Challenge 86 - Buchinger vs. Dalgiev | November 24, 2017 | Sports Palace "Magas" | Nazran, Russia |
| 19 | M-1 Challenge 85: Ismagulov vs. Matias | November 10, 2017 | Olimpiyskiy | Moscow, Russia |
| 18 | M-1 Challenge 84 - Kunchenko vs. Romanov | October 27, 2017 | Ice Palace | Saint Petersburg, Russia |
| 17 | M-1 Challenge 83 - Ragozin vs. Halsey | September 23, 2017 | Basket-Hall Kazan | Kazan, Russia |
| 16 | Road to China 2 | September 7, 2017 | Grand Restaurant Qin | Moscow, Russia |
| 15 | Road to M-1: Battle in Nazran 8 | August 27, 2017 | Sports Palace "Magas" | Nazran, Russia |
| 14 | M-1 Challenge 82 - Vanttinen vs. Zayats | August 5, 2017 | Hartwall Arena | Helsinki, Finland |
| 13 | M-1 Challenge 81 - Battle in the Mountains 6 | July 22, 2017 | The Mountain | Nazran, Russia |
| 12 | M-1 Challenge 80 - Kharitonov vs. Sokoudjou | June 15, 2017 | Harbin International Convention Exhibition and Sports Center | Harbin, China |
| 11 | Road to M-1: St. Petersburg 3 | June 8, 2017 | A2 Green Concert Hall | Saint Petersburg, Russia |
| 10 | M-1 Challenge 79 - Shlemenko vs. Halsey 2 | June 1, 2017 | Yubileyny Sports Palace | Saint Petersburg, Russia |
| 9 | M-1 Challenge 78 - Divnich vs. Ismagulov | May 26, 2017 | Orenburzhye Sport Arena | Orenburg, Russia |
| 8 | Road to M-1: Battle in Nazran 7 | May 20, 2017 | Sports Palace "Magas" | Nazran, Russia |
| 7 | M-1 Challenge 77 - Nemkov vs. Markes | May 19, 2017 | Sochi sport palace | Sochi, Russia |
| 6 | Road to M-1: St. Petersburg 2 | April 27, 2017 | A2 Green Concert Hall | Saint Petersburg, Russia |
| 5 | M-1 Challenge 76 - Nevzorov vs. Evloev | April 22, 2017 | Sports Palace "Magas" | Nazran, Russia |
| 4 | Road to M-1: Battle in Nazran 6 | March 11, 2017 | Sports Palace "Magas" | Nazran, Russia |
| 3 | M-1 Challenge 75 - Shlemenko vs. Bradley | March 3, 2017 | Olimpiyskiy | Moscow, Russia |
| 2 | M-1 Challenge 74 - Yusupov vs. Puetz | February 18, 2017 | Ice Palace | Saint Petersburg, Russia |
| 1 | Road to M-1: St. Petersburg 1 | February 9, 2017 | A2 Green Concert Hall | Saint Petersburg, Russia |

== Current M-1 USA National champions ==
| Division | Champion | Since | Defenses |
|---|---|---|---|
| Welterweight | (United States) Dakota Cochrane | April 4, 2019 | 0 |

== List of M-1 Global champions ==
=== M-1 Global Heavyweight Championship ===
Weight limit: 120 kg (264.6 lb)

| No. | Name | Event | Date | Defenses |
|---|---|---|---|---|
| Current | Vacant | N/A | N/A | N/A |
Alexander Volkov vacated the title when he signed for UFC.
| 5 | (Russia) Alexander Volkov def. Denis Smoldarev | M-1 Challenge 64; Moscow, Russia | February 19, 2016 | 1. def. Attila Vegh at M-1 Challenge 68 on July 16, 2016 in Saint Petersburg, Russia |
Marcin Tybura vacated the title when he signed for UFC.
| 4 | (Poland) Marcin Tybura | M-1 Challenge 50; Saint Petersburg, Russia | August 15, 2014 | 1. def. Denis Smoldarev at M-1 Challenge 53 on November 25, 2014 in Beijing, China; 2. def. Ante Delija at M-1 Challenge 61 on September 20, 2015 in Nazran, Russia |
| 3 | (Poland) Damian Grabowski | M-1 Challenge 44; Tula, Russia | November 30, 2013 | N/A |
| 2 | (United States) Kenny Garner def. Guram Gugenishvili | M-1: Fedor vs. Rizzo; Saint Petersburg, Russia | June 21, 2012 | 1. def. Guram Gugenishvili at M-1 Challenge 36 on December 8, 2012 in Moscow, Russia |
| Interim | (United States) Kenny Garner def. Maxim Grishin | M-1 Challenge 27 (United States) Phoenix, Arizona | October 14, 2011 | 1. def. Magomed Malikov at M-1 Challenge 32 on May 16, 2012 in Moscow, Russia |
| 1 | (Georgia (country)) Guram Gugenishvili def. Kenny Garner | M-1 Challenge 21; Moscow, Russia | October 28, 2010 | 1. def. Maxim Grishin at M-1 Challenge 23 on March 5, 2011 in Saint Petersburg, Russia |

=== M-1 Global Light Heavyweight Championship ===
Weight limit: 93 kg (205.0 lb)

| No. | Name | Event | Date | Defenses |
|---|---|---|---|---|
| Current | Vacant | N/A | N/A | N/A |
Khadis Ibragimov vacated the title when he signed for UFC.
| 8 | (Russia) Khadis Ibragimov def. Dimitriy Mikutsa | M-1 Challenge 96; Saint Petersburg, Russia | August 25, 2018 | 1. def. Rafał Kijańczuk at M-1 Challenge 101 on March 30, 2019 in Almaty, Kazakhstan |
Rashid Yusupov vacated the title when he signed for PFL.
| 7 | (Russia) Rashid Yusupov | M-1 Challenge 66; Orenburg, Russia | May 27, 2016 | 1. def. Stephan Puetz at M-1 Challenge 74 on February 18, 2017 in Saint Petersburg, Russia |
| 6 | (Russia) Viktor Nemkov | M-1 Challenge 63; Saint Petersburg, Russia | December 4, 2015 | N/A |
| 5 | (Germany) Stephan Puetz | M-1 Challenge 46; Saint Petersburg, Russia | March 14, 2014 | 1. def. Luis Fernando Miranda at M-1 Challenge 50 on August 15, 2014 in Saint Petersburg, Russia; 2. def. Valery Myasnikov at M-1 Challenge 54 on December 17, 2014 in Saint Petersburg, Russia |
| 4 | (Russia) Viktor Nemkov def. Vasily Babich | M-1 Challenge 43; Surgut, Russia | November 16, 2013 | N/A |
Sergey Kornev vacated the title.
| 3 | (Russia) Sergey Kornev def. Marcin Zontek | M-1 Challenge 34; Moscow, Russia | September 30, 2012 | N/A |
Vinny Magalhães vacated the title when he signed for UFC.
| 2 | (Brazil) Vinny Magalhães def. Viktor Nemkov | M-1 Challenge 25; Saint Petersburg, Russia | April 28, 2011 | 1. def. Mikhail Zayats at M-1 Challenge 27 on October 14, 2011 in Phoenix, Arizona, United States |
Vyacheslav Vasilevsky vacated the title when he moved down to middleweight.
| 1 | (Russia) Vyacheslav Vasilevsky def. Tomasz Narkun | M-1 Challenge 22; Moscow, Russia | December 10, 2010 | N/A |

=== M-1 Global Middleweight Championship ===
Weight limit: 84 kg (185.2 lb)

| No. | Name | Event | Date | Defenses |
|---|---|---|---|---|
| Current | Vacant | N/A | N/A | N/A |
Bruno Silva vacated the title when he signed for UFC.
| 7 | (Brazil) Bruno Silva | M-1 Challenge 98; Chelyabinsk, Russia | November 2, 2018 | |
| 6 | (Russia) Artem Frolov def. Caio Magalhaes | M-1 Challenge 84; Saint Petersburg, Russia | October 27, 2017 | 1. def. Joe Riggs at M-1 Challenge 93 on June 1, 2018 in Chelyabinsk, Russia |
Ramazan Emeev vacated the title when he signed for UFC.
| 5 | (Russia) Ramazan Emeev | M-1 Challenge 56; Moscow, Russia | April 10, 2015 | 1. def. Luigi Fioravanti at M-1 Challenge 63 on December 4, 2015 in St. Petersburg, Russia; 2. def. Anatoly Tokov at M-1 Challenge 73 on December 9, 2016 in Nazran, Russia |
| 4 | (Russia) Vyacheslav Vasilevsky | M-1 Challenge 51; Saint Petersburg, Russia | September 7, 2014 | N/A |
| 3 | (Russia) Ramazan Emeev def. Mario Miranda | M-1 Challenge 35; Saint Petersburg, Russia | November 15, 2012 | 1. def. Mario Miranda at M-1 Challenge 38 on April 9, 2013 in St. Petersburg, Russia |
Magomed Sultanakhmedov vacated the title due to health issue.
| 2 | (Russia) Magomed Sultanakhmedov def. Tyson Jeffries | M-1 Challenge 24 (United States) Norfolk, Virginia | March 25, 2011 | N/A |
Rafał Moks vacated the title when he moved down to welterweight.
| 1 | (Poland) Rafał Moks def. Magomed Sultanakhmedov | M-1 Challenge 22; Moscow, Russia | December 10, 2010 | N/A |

=== M-1 Global Welterweight Championship ===
Weight limit: 77 kg (169.8 lb)

| No. | Name | Event | Date | Defenses |
|---|---|---|---|---|
| Current | Vacant | N/A | N/A | N/A |
Rakhmonov vacated the title when he signed for UFC.
| 6 | (Kazakhstan) Shavkat Rakhmonov def. Daniil Prikaza | M-1 Challenge 101; Almaty, Kazakhstan | March 30, 2019 | 1. def. Tiago Varejão at M-1 Challenge 102 on June 28, 2019 in Nur-Sultan, Kazakhstan |
Alexey Kunchenko vacated the title when he signed for UFC.
| 5 | (Russia) Alexey Kunchenko | M-1 Challenge 65; Saint Petersburg, Russia | April 8, 2016 | 1. def. Murad Abdulaev at M-1 Challenge 72 on November 18, 2016 in Moscow, Russia; 2. def. Maksim Grabovich at M-1 Challenge 75 on March 3, 2017 in Moscow, Russia; 3. def. Sergey Romanov at M-1 Challenge 84 on October 27, 2017 in Saint Petersburg, Russia; 4. def. Alexander Butenko at M-1 Challenge 90 on March 30, 2018 in Saint Petersburg, Russia |
| 4 | (Russia) Murad Abdulaev def. Marcelo Brito | M-1 Challenge 58; Ingushetia, Russia | June 6, 2015 | N/A |
Rashid Magomedov vacated the title when he signed for UFC.
| 3 | (Russia) Rashid Magomedov | M-1 Challenge 31; Saint Petersburg, Russia | March 16, 2012 | 1. def. Alexander Yakovlev at M-1 Challenge 35 on November 15, 2012 in Saint Petersburg, Russia |
| 2 | (Switzerland) Yasubey Enomoto | M-1 Challenge 30 (United States) Costa Mesa, California | December 9, 2011 | N/A |
| 1 | (Russia) Shamil Zavurov def. Abner Lloveras | M-1 Challenge 22; Moscow, Russia | December 10, 2010 | 1. def. Yasubey Enomoto at M-1 Challenge 25 on April 28, 2011 in Saint Petersburg, Russia |

=== M-1 Global Lightweight Championship ===
Weight limit: 70 kg (154.3 lb)

| No. | Name | Event | Date | Defenses |
|---|---|---|---|---|
| Current | Vacant | N/A | N/A | N/A |
Roman Bogatov vacated the title when he signed for UFC.
| 9 | (Russia) Roman Bogatov def. Rubenilton Pereira | M-1 Challenge 97; Kazan, Russia | September 28, 2018 | 1. def. Michel Silva at M-1 Challenge/ WKG on January 26, 2019 in Harbin, China; 2. def. Mickaël Lebout at M-1 Challenge 104 on August 30, 2019 in Orenburg, Russia |
Damir Ismagulov vacated the title when he signed for UFC.
| 9 | (Kazakhstan) Damir Ismagulov def. Maxim Divnich | M-1 Challenge 78; Orenburg, Russia | May 26, 2017 | 1. def. Raul Tutarauli at M-1 Challenge 88 on February 22, 2018 in Moscow, Russia; 2. def. Artiom Damkovsky at M-1 Challenge 94 on June 15, 2018 in Orenburg, Russia |
Abukar Yandiev vacated the title.
| 8 | (Russia) Abukar Yandiev | M-1 Challenge 74; Saint Petersburg, Russia | February 18, 2017 | N/A |
| 7 | (Ukraine) Alexander Butenko def. Artiom Damkovsky | M-1 Challenge 67; Baku, Azerbaijan | June 4, 2016 | N/A |
Mansour Barnaoui vacated the title when he signed for KSW.
| 6 | (France) Mansour Barnaoui | M-1 Challenge 57; Orenburg, Russia | May 2, 2015 | N/A |
| 5 | (Ukraine) Maxim Divnich def. Dzhambulat Kurbanov | M-1 Challenge 54; Saint Petersburg, Russia | December 17, 2014 | N/A |
Musa Khamanaev vacated the title.
| 4 | (Russia) Musa Khamanaev | M-1 Global: Fedor vs. Pedro Rizzo; Saint Petersburg, Russia | June 21, 2012 | 1. def. Niko Puhakka at M-1 Challenge 37 on February 27, 2013 in Orenburg, Russia |
| 3 | (Germany) Daniel Weichel | M-1 Global: Fedor vs. Monson; Moscow, Russia | November 20, 2011 | N/A |
| 2 | (United States) Jose Figueroa | M-1 Challenge 24 (United States) Norfolk, Virginia | March 25, 2011 | N/A |
| 1 | (Belarus) Artiom Damkovsky def. Mairbek Taisumov | M-1 Challenge 21; Saint Petersburg, Russia | October 28, 2010 | N/A |

=== M-1 Global Featherweight Championship ===
Weight limit: 65 kg (143.3 lb)

| No. | Name | Event | Date | Defenses |
|---|---|---|---|---|
| Current | Vacant | N/A | N/A | N/A |
Nate Landwehr vacated the title when he signed for UFC.
| 4 | (United States) Nate Landwehr | M-1 Challenge 95; Nazran, Russia | July 21, 2018 | 1. def. Andrey Lezhnev at M-1 Challenge 100 on December 15, 2018 in Atyrau, Kazakhstan; 2. def. Viktor Kolesnik at M-1 Challenge 102 on June 28, 2019 in Nur-Sultan, Kazakhstan |
| 3 | (Russia) Khamzat Dalgiev | M-1 Challenge 86; Nazran, Russia | November 24, 2017 | N/A |
| 2 | (Slovakia) Ivan Buchinger def. Tural Ragimov | M-1 Challenge 52; Nazran, Russia | October 17, 2014 | 1. def. Mansour Barnaoui at M-1 Challenge 62 on October 10, 2015 in Sochi, Russia; 2. def. Timur Nagibin at M-1 Challenge 80 on June 15, 2017 in Harbin, China |
Marat Gafurov vacated the title when he signed for ONE FC.
| 1 | (Russia) Marat Gafurov def. Vugar Bahshiev | M-1 Challenge 35; Saint Petersburg, Russia | November 15, 2012 | 1. def. Yuri Ivlev at M-1 Challenge 41 on August 21, 2013 in Saint Petersburg, Russia; 2. def. Lee Morrison at M-1 Challenge 47 on April 4, 2014 in Orenburg, Russia |

=== M-1 Global Bantamweight Championship ===
Weight limit: 61 kg (134.5 lb)

| No. | Name | Event | Date | Defenses |
|---|---|---|---|---|
| Current | Vacant | N/A | N/A | N/A |
Sergey Morozov vacated the title when he signed for UFC.
| 3 | (Kazakhstan) Sergey Morozov def. Aleksandr Osetrov | M-1 Challenge 102; Nur-Sultan, Kazakhstan | June 28, 2019 | 1. def. Josh Rettinghouse at M-1 Challenge 105 on October 19, 2019 in Moscow, Russia |
Movsar Evloev vacated the title when he signed for UFC.
| 2 | (Russia) Movsar Evloev def. Pavel Vitruk | M-1 Challenge 81; Nazran, Russia | July 22, 2017 | 1. def. Sergey Morozov at M-1 Challenge 88 on February 22, 2018 in Moscow, Russia; 2. def. Rafael Dias at M-1 Challenge 95 on July 21, 2018 in Nazran, Russia |
Title Unification
| Interim | (Russia) Movsar Evloev def. Alexei Nevzorov | M-1 Challenge 76; Nalchik, Russia | April 22, 2017 | N/A |
| 1 | (Ukraine) Pavel Vitruk def. Vitali Branchuk | M-1 Challenge 71; Saint Petersburg, Russia | October 21, 2016 | N/A |

=== M-1 Global Flyweight Championship ===
Weight limit: 57 kg (125.7 lb)

| No. | Name | Event | Date | Defenses |
|---|---|---|---|---|
| Current | Vacant | N/A | N/A | N/A |
Aleksander Doskalchuk vacated the title when he signed for UFC.
| Interim | (Kazakhstan) Asu Almabayev | M-1 Challenge 105; Nur-Sultan, Kazakhstan | October 19, 2019 | N/A |
| Interim | (Canada) Chris Kelades def. Alexander Pletenko | M-1 Challenge 103; Shenzhen, China | August 3, 2019 | N/A |
| 2 | (Ukraine) Aleksander Doskalchuk def. Arman Ashimov | M-1 Challenge 92; St. Petersburg, Russia | May 24, 2018 | 2. def. Mikael Silander at M-1 Challenge 99 on November 17, 2018 in Nazran, Russia |
Title Unification
| Interim | (Kazakhstan) Arman Ashimov def. Mikael Silander | M-1 Challenge 87; St. Petersburg, Russia | February 9, 2018 | N/A |
| 1 | (Ukraine) Aleksander Doskalchuk def. Vadim Malygin | M-1 Challenge 83; Kazan, Russia | September 23, 2017 | N/A |

=== M-1 USA National Welterweight Championship ===
Weight limit: 77 kg (169.8 lb)

| No. | Name | Event | Date | Defenses |
|---|---|---|---|---|
| Current | (United States) Dakota Cochrane def. James Warfield-Lane | M-1 Challenge: Road to M-1 USA 2 (United States) Winterhaven, California, USA | April 4, 2019 | |

== Notable fighters ==
Russia

- (Russia) Julia Berezikova
- (Russia) Viacheslav Datsik
- (Russia) Abdul-Kerim Edilov
- (Russia) Ramazan Emeev
- (Russia) Alexander Emelianenko
- (Russia) Fedor Emelianenko
- (Russia) Movsar Evloev
- (Russia) Radmir Gabdullin
- (Russia) Marat Gafurov
- (Russia) Vener Galiev
- (Russia) Sergey Golyaev
- (Russia) Maxim Grishin
- (Russia) Khadis Ibragimov
- (Russia) Daria Ibragimova
- (Russia) Rustam Khabilov
- (Russia) Sergei Kharitonov
- (Russia) Magomedrasul Khasbulaev
- (Russia) Alexey Kunchenko
- (Russia) Magomed Magomedov
- (Russia) Rashid Magomedov
- (Russia) Islam Makhachev
- (Russia) Vitaly Minakov
- (Russia) Jeff Monson
- (Russia) Vadim Nemkov
- (Russia) Viktor Nemkov
- (Russia) Khabib Nurmagomedov
- (Russia) Alexey Oliynyk
- (Russia) Yana Santos
- (Russia) Alexander Sarnavskiy
- (Russia) Andrei Semenov
- (Russia) Kirill Sidelnikov
- (Russia) Shahbulat Shamhalaev
- (Russia) Alexander Shlemenko
- (Russia) Akop Stepanyan
- (Russia) Mairbek Taisumov
- (Russia) Gasan Umalatov
- (Russia) Vyacheslav Vasilevsky
- (Russia) Alexander Volkov
- (Russia) Alexander Yakovlev
- (Russia) Shamil Zavurov
- (Russia) Mikhail Zayats
- (Russia) Roman Zentsov

United States

- (United States) Shamar Bailey
- (United States) Rudy Bears
- (United States) Paul Bradley
- (United States) Steve Carl
- (United States) Dakota Cochrane
- (United States) Raphael Davis
- (United States) Shane del Rosario
- (United States) Jake Ellenberger
- (United States) Jamall Emmers
- (United States) Luigi Fioravanti
- (United States) Travis Fulton
- (United States) Herbert Goodman
- (United States) Brandon Halsey
- (United States) Hayder Hassan
- (United States) Dave Jansen
- (United States) Mike Johnson
- (United States) Mark Kerr
- (United States) Muhammed Lawal
- (United States) Nate Landwehr
- (United States) Bristol Marunde
- (United States) Zach Makovsky
- (United States) Cody McKenzie
- (United States) Jeff Monson
- (United States) Bao Quach
- (United States) Joe Riggs
- (United States) Shannon Ritch
- (United States) Kevin Roddy
- (United States) Ben Rothwell
- (United States) Dave Strasser
- (United States) Colton Smith
- (United States) Rodney Wallace
- (United States) Mike Whitehead
- (United States) Keith Wisniewski
- (United States) Travis Wiuff

Brazil

- (Brazil) Klidson Abreu
- (Brazil) Daniel Acácio
- (Brazil) Igor Araújo
- (Brazil) João Assis
- (Brazil) Carlos Barreto
- (Brazil) Hacran Dias
- (Brazil) Carlos Eduardo
- (Brazil) Maiquel Falcão
- (Brazil) Ivan Jorge
- (Brazil) Caio Magalhães
- (Brazil) Vinny Magalhães
- (Brazil) Ronny Markes
- (Brazil) Mario Miranda
- (Brazil) Pedro Rizzo
- (Brazil) Giva Santana
- (Brazil) Bruno Silva

Netherlands

- (Netherlands) Bob Schrijber
- (Netherlands) Rodney Glunder
- (Netherlands) Brian Lo-A-Njoe
- (Netherlands) Melvin Manhoef
- (Netherlands) Gegard Mousasi
- (Netherlands) Alistair Overeem
- (Netherlands) Valentijn Overeem
- (Netherlands) Rick Rootlieb
- (Netherlands) Ronny Rivano
- (Netherlands) Sander Thonhauser
- (Netherlands) Piet van Gammeren
- (Netherlands) Herman van Tol
- (Netherlands) Gilbert Yvel

Japan

- (Japan) Kazuhiro Hamanaka
- (Japan) Satoshi Ishii
- (Japan) Yusuke Kawaguchi
- (Japan) Tatsuya Mizuno
- (Japan) Daisuke Nakamura
- (Japan) Yushin Okami
- (Japan) Yuya Shirai

France

- (France) Karl Amoussou
- (France) Mansour Barnaoui
- (France) Bendy Casimir
- (France) Ferrid Kheder
- (France) Mickaël Lebout
- (France) Fernand Lopez
- (France) Reda Oudgou
- (France) Norman Paraisy

Kazakhstan

- (Kazakhstan) Asu Almabayev
- (Kazakhstan) Damir Ismagulov
- (Kazakhstan) Sergey Morozov
- (Kazakhstan) Shavkat Rakhmonov

Poland

- (Poland) Damian Grabowski
- (Poland) Rafał Moks
- (Poland) Tomasz Narkun
- (Poland) Marcin Tybura

South Korea

- (South Korea) Yui Chul Nam
- (South Korea) Choi Doo-ho
- (South Korea) Tae Hyun Bang
- (South Korea) Lim Hyun-gyu

Belarus

- (Belarus) Andrei Arlovski
- (Belarus) Sergei Gur
- (Belarus) Alexey Kudin

Canada

- (Canada) Tanner Boser
- (Canada) Denis Kang
- (Canada) Chris Kelades

England

- (England) Rob Broughton
- (England) Phil De Fries
- (England) Che Mills

Germany

- (Germany) Chalid Arrab
- (Germany) Stephan Puetz
- (Germany) Daniel Weichel

Bulgaria

- (Bulgaria) Rosen Dimitrov
- (Bulgaria) Jordan Radev

Sweden

- (Sweden) David Bielkheden
- (Sweden) Jani Lax

Ukraine

- (Ukraine) Serhii Adamchuk
- (Ukraine) Alyona Rassohyna

Other

- (Cuba) Michel Batista
- (Belgium) Cindy Dandois
- (Croatia) Ante Delija
- (Switzerland) Yasubey Enomoto
- (Latvia) Konstantin Gluhov
- (Greece) Elina Kallionidou
- (Denmark) Martin Kampmann
- (Turkey) Fatih Kocamis
- (Spain) Abner Lloveras
- (Moldova) Valeriu Mircea
- (Democratic Republic of the Congo) Christian M'Pumbu
- (Italy) Alessio Sakara
- (Cameroon) Sokoudjou
- (Armenia) Amar Suloev
- (Georgia (country)) Raul Tutarauli
- (Slovakia) Attila Vegh

== See also ==
- List of current mixed martial arts champions
- M-1 Challenge
- Armored combat (sport), M-1 Global runs a buhurt circuit calling it Russian medieval MMA.
