= 2017 in M-1 Global =

Mixed martial arts events

Information
- First date: February 9

Events

Fights

Chronology
2017 in M-1 Global	2018 in M-1 Global

The year 2017 is the 20th year in the history of the M-1 Global, a mixed martial arts promotion based in Russia.

== List of events ==
#	Event title	Date	Arena	Location
1	Road to M-1: St. Petersburg 1	February 9, 2017	A2 Green Concert Hall	Saint Petersburg, Russia
2	M-1 Challenge 74 - Yusupov vs. Puetz	February 18, 2017	Ice Palace	Saint Petersburg, Russia
3	M-1 Challenge 75 - Shlemenko vs. Bradley	March 3, 2017	Olimpiyskiy	Moscow, Russia
4	Road to M-1: Battle in Nazran 6	March 11, 2017	Sports Palace "Magas"	Nazran, Russia
5	M-1 Challenge 76 - Nevzorov vs. Evloev	April 22, 2017	Sports Palace "Magas"	Nazran, Russia
6	Road to M-1: St. Petersburg 2	April 27, 2017	A2 Green Concert Hall	Saint Petersburg, Russia
7	M-1 Challenge 77 - Nemkov vs. Markes	May 19, 2017	Sochi sport palace	Sochi, Russia
8	Road to M-1: Battle in Nazran 7	May 20, 2017	Sports Palace "Magas"	Nazran, Russia
9	M-1 Challenge 78 - Divnich vs. Ismagulov	May 26, 2017	Orenburzhye Sport Arena	Orenburg, Russia
10	M-1 Challenge 79 - Shlemenko vs. Halsey 2	June 1, 2017	Yubileyny Sports Palace	Saint Petersburg, Russia
11	Road to M-1: St. Petersburg 3	June 8, 2017	A2 Green Concert Hall	Saint Petersburg, Russia
12	M-1 Challenge 80 - Kharitonov vs. Sokoudjou	June 15, 2017	Harbin International Convention Exhibition and Sports Center	Harbin, China
13	M-1 Challenge 81 - Battle in the Mountains 6	July 22, 2017	The Mountain	Nazran, Russia
14	M-1 Challenge 82 - Vanttinen vs. Zayats	August 5, 2017	Hartwall Arena	Helsinki, Finland
15	Road to M-1: Battle in Nazran 8	August 27, 2017	Sports Palace "Magas"	Nazran, Russia
15	M-1 Challenge 83 - Ragozin vs. Halsey	September 23, 2017	Basket-Hall Kazan	Kazan, Russia
16	M-1 Challenge 84 - Kunchenko vs. Romanov	October 27, 2017	Ice Palace	Saint Petersburg, Russia
17	M-1 Challenge 85: Ismagulov vs. Matias	November 10, 2017	Olimpiyskiy	Moscow, Russia
18	M-1 Challenge 86 - Buchinger vs. Dalgiev	November 24, 2017	Sports Palace "Magas"	Nazran, Russia

== M-1 Challenge 74 - Yusupov vs. Puetz ==
M-1 Challenge 74 - Yusupov vs. Puetz
- Promotion: M-1 Global
- Date: February 18, 2017
- Venue: Ice Palace
- City: Saint Petersburg, Russia

M-1 Challenge 74 - Yusupov vs. Puetz was a mixed martial arts event held by M-1 Global on February 18, 2017 at the Ice Palace in Saint Petersburg, Russia.

=== Background ===
This event featured two world title fight, first for the M-1 Light Heavyweight Championship Rashid Yusupov and Stephan Puetz as M-1 Challenge 74 headliner, and a Lightweight pairing between Abukar Yandiev and Alexander Butenko for the M-1 Lightweight Championship as co-headliner.

=== Result ===
M-1 Challenge 74
Weight Class				Method	Round	Time	Notes
Light Heavyweight 93 kg	(Russia) Rashid Yusupov	def.	(Germany) Stephan Puetz	TKO (Corner Stoppage)	3	3:26	For the M-1 Light Heavyweight Championship.
Lightweight 70 kg	(Russia) Abukar Yandiev	def.	(Ukraine) Alexander Butenko	TKO (Punches)	1	1:07	For the M-1 Lightweight Championship.
Catchweight 72 kg	(Kazakhstan) Damir Ismagulov	def.	(France) Morgan Heraud	TKO (Punches)	3	1:31	
Lightweight 70 kg	(Belarus) Artiom Damkovsky	def.	(Brazil) Erivan Pereira	Decision (Unanimous)	3	5:00	
Bantamweight 61 kg	(Ukraine) Vitali Branchuk	def.	(France) Moktar Benkaci	Decision (Unanimous)	3	5:00	
Heavyweight 120 kg	(Brazil) Marcus Vinicius Lopes	def.	(Russia) Evgeni Myakinkin	Decision (Unanimous)	3	5:00	
Preliminary Card
Light Heavyweight 93 kg	(Russia) Dmitry Tebekin	def.	(Russia) Artur Tyulparov	Submission (Guillotine Choke)	1	1:59	
Welterweight 77 kg	(Switzerland) Pablo Ortmann	def.	(Ukraine) Vyacheslav Bogomol	Submission (Triangle Choke)	1	1:27	
Welterweight 77 kg	(Brazil) Bruce Souto	def.	(Russia) Payzula Magomedov	Submission (Rear Naked Choke)	3	2:40	
Catchweight 62 kg	(Ukraine) Dmitriy Orlov	def.	(Russia) Mikhail Kuznetsov	Submission (Triangle Choke)	2	4:24	
Bantamweight 61 kg	(Russia) Vadim Malygin	def.	(Brazil) Denes Carvalho	KO (Punch)	3	0:45	

== M-1 Challenge 75 - Shlemenko vs. Bradley ==
M-1 Challenge 75 - Shlemenko vs. Bradley
- Promotion: M-1 Global
- Date: March 3, 2017
- Venue: Olimpiyskiy
- City: Moscow, Russia

M-1 Challenge 75 - Shlemenko vs. Bradley was a mixed martial arts event held by M-1 Global on March 3, 2017 at the Olimpiyskiy in Moscow, Russia.

=== Background ===
This event featured a superfight between the former Bellator Middleweight Champion Alexander Shlemenko and Paul Bradley as M-1 Challenge 75 headliner, and a Welterweight pairing between Alexey Kunchenko and Maksim Grabovich for the M-1 Welterweight Championship as co-headliner.

=== Result ===
M-1 Challenge 75
Weight Class				Method	Round	Time	Notes
Middleweight 84 kg	(Russia) Alexander Shlemenko	def.	(United States) Paul Bradley	Decision (Unanimous)	3	5:00	
Welterweight 77 kg	(Russia) Alexey Kunchenko	def.	(Russia) Maksim Grabovich	Decision (Unanimous)	5	5:00	For the M-1 Welterweight Championship.
Welterweight 77 kg	(Russia) Sergey Romanov	def.	(Russia) Magomed Sultanakhmedov	Decision (Unanimous)	3	5:00	
Lightweight 70 kg	(Ukraine) Maxim Divnich	def.	(United States) Keon Caldwell	TKO (Punches)	2	3:03	
Light Heavyweight 93 kg	(Brazil) Carlos Eduardo	def.	(Moldova) Boris Polezhay	Decision (Unanimous)	3	5:00	
Preliminary Card
Middleweight 84 kg	(Russia) Valery Myasnikov	def.	(Brazil) Amilcar Alves	KO (Punch)	1	3:00	
Lightweight 70 kg	(Georgia (country)) Raul Tutarauli	def.	(Germany) Mohamed Grabinski	TKO (Punches)	2	3:50	
Lightweight 70 kg	(Russia) Abubakar Mestoev	def.	(Germany) Niko Samsonidse	Decision (Unanimous)	3	5:00	
Featherweight 66 kg	(Russia) Viktor Kolesnik	vs.	(South Korea) Young Bok Kil	Draw (Majority)	3	5:00	
Catchweight 80 kg	(Russia) Daniil Prikaza	def.	(Ukraine) Maksim Melnik	Submission (Rear Naked Choke)	1	1:54	
Catchweight 68 kg	(Russia) Roman Bogatov	def.	(Ukraine) Aleksey Sotnikov	Submission (Arm-Triangle Choke)	1	1:56	

== M-1 Challenge 76 - Nevzorov vs. Evloev ==
M-1 Challenge 76 - Nevzorov vs. Evloev
- Promotion: M-1 Global
- Date: April 22, 2017
- Venue: Sports Palace "Magas"
- City: Nazran, Russia

M-1 Challenge 76 - Nevzorov vs. Evloev was a mixed martial arts event held by M-1 Global on April 22, 2017 at the Sports Palace "Magas" in Nazran, Russia.

=== Result ===
M-1 Challenge 76
Weight Class				Method	Round	Time	Notes
Bantamweight 61 kg	(Russia) Movsar Evloev	def.	(Russia) Alexei Nevzorov	KO (Head Kick)	2	2:15	For the Interim M-1 Bantamweight Championship.
Featherweight 66 kg	(Russia) Timur Nagibin	def.	(Brazil) Diego D'Avila	Decision (Unanimous)	3	5:00	
Bantamweight 61 kg	(Kazakhstan) Sergey Morozov	def.	(Brazil) Fabricio Sarraff	Decision (Unanimous)	3	5:00	
Light Heavyweight 93 kg	(Germany) Rene Hoppe	def.	(Russia) Ilya Bochkov	Decision (Majority)	3	5:00	
Catchweight 72 kg	(Russia) Abubakar Mestoev	def.	(Ukraine) Anatoly Liagu	Decision (Unanimous)	3	5:00	
Preliminary Card
Welterweight 77 kg	(Russia) Khamzat Sakalov	def.	(Spain) Javier Fuentes	Decision (Unanimous)	3	5:00	
Catchweight 67 kg	(Russia) Emil Abbasov	def.	(Brazil) Heliton dos Santos	TKO (Punches)	1	2:39	
Featherweight 66 kg	(Russia) Zalimbeg Omarov	def.	(Ukraine) Elnur Veliev	Decision (Unanimous)	3	5:00	
Heavyweight 120 kg	(Russia) Evgeniy Goncharov	def.	(Russia) Daniil Arepyev	Decision (Unanimous)	3	5:00	
Welterweight 77 kg	(Russia) Ingiskhan Ozdoev	def.	(Ukraine) Alexey Valivakhin	TKO (Punches)	1	3:22	

== M-1 Challenge 77 - Nemkov vs. Markes ==
M-1 Challenge 77 - Nemkov vs. Markes
- Promotion: M-1 Global
- Date: May 19, 2017
- Venue: Sochi sport palace
- City: Sochi, Russia

M-1 Challenge 77 - Nemkov vs. Markes was a mixed martial arts event held by M-1 Global on May 19, 2017 at the Sochi sport palace in Sochi, Russia.

=== Result ===
M-1 Challenge 77
Weight Class				Method	Round	Time	Notes
Light Heavyweight 93 kg	(Russia) Viktor Nemkov	def.	(Brazil) Ronny Markes	Submission (Guillotine Choke)	1	2:06	
Middleweight 84 kg	(Russia) Artem Frolov	def.	(Azerbaijan) Talekh Nadzhafadze	TKO (Punches)	1	1:40	
Middleweight 84 kg	(United States) Moses Murrietta	def.	(Russia) Andrey Seledtsov	Decision (Unanimous)	3	5:00	
Lightweight 70 kg	(Georgia (country)) Raul Tutarauli	def.	(Angola) Artur Lemos	Decision (Unanimous)	3	5:00	
Featherweight 66 kg	(Russia) Viktor Kolesnik	def.	(Brazil) Felipe Rego	Decision (Unanimous)	3	5:00	
Preliminary Card
Lightweight 70 kg	(Russia) Pavel Gordeev	def.	(Germany) Till Kinne	Decision (Unanimous)	3	5:00	
Welterweight 77 kg	(Ukraine) Andrey Lezhnev	def.	(Russia) Kurbanali Abdusalamov	KO (Liver Shot)	1	1:17	
Bantamweight 61 kg	(Russia) Sergey Klyuev	def.	(Ukraine) Sergey Voloshin	KO (Punch)	1	0:32	
Lightweight 70 kg	(Russia) Lom-Ali Nalgiev	def.	(Belarus) Sergey Faley	Decision (Unanimous)	3	5:00	
Light Heavyweight 93 kg	(Russia) Nikolay Savilov	def.	(Germany) Frank Kortz	TKO (Punches)	1	2:32	
Lightweight 70 kg	(Russia) Alexey Bruss	def.	(Spain) Daniel Diaz	Submission (Rear Naked Choke)	2	1:08	

== M-1 Challenge 78 - Divnich vs. Ismagulov ==
M-1 Challenge 78 - Divnich vs. Ismagulov
- Promotion: M-1 Global
- Date: May 26, 2017
- Venue: Orenburzhye Sport Arena
- City: Orenburg, Russia

M-1 Challenge 78 - Divnich vs. Ismagulov was a mixed martial arts event held by M-1 Global on May 26, 2017 at the Orenburzhye Sport Arena in Orenburg, Russia.

=== Result ===
M-1 Challenge 78
Weight Class				Method	Round	Time	Notes
Lightweight 70 kg	(Kazakhstan) Damir Ismagulov	def.	(Ukraine) Maxim Divnich	TKO (Punches)	5	4:47	For the Vacant M-1 Lightweight Championship.
Light Heavyweight 93 kg	(Russia) Mikhail Ragozin	def.	(Brazil) Alan Bispo	TKO (Punches)	3	4:32	
Middleweight 84 kg	(Brazil) Caio Magalhães	def.	(Belarus) Dmitry Voitov	Submission (Rear Naked Choke)	1	1:16	
Lightweight 70 kg	(United States) Keith Johnson	def.	(Russia) Maksim Grabovich	Submission (Rear Naked Choke)	3	4:22	
Flyweight 57 kg	(Russia) Vadim Malygin	def.	(Brazil) Fabricio Sarraff	Decision (Majority)	3	5:00	
Preliminary Card
Flyweight 57 kg	(Ukraine) Aleksander Doskalchuk	def.	(Sweden) Son Le Binh	Decision (Majority)	3	5:00	
Lightweight 70 kg	(Russia) Roman Bogatov	def.	(England) Rico Franco	Submission (Bravo choke)	1	4:52	
Middleweight 84 kg	(Brazil) Rubenilton Pereira	def.	(Kyrgyzstan) Marip uulu Orozbek	Decision (Majority)	3	5:00	
Featherweight 66 kg	(Russia) Vitali Tverdokhlebov	def.	(Ukraine) Oleg Mykhayliv	TKO (Punches)	2	2:13	
Bantamweight 61 kg	(Russia) Selem Evloev	def.	(Russia) Aleksey Dubrovniy	Decision (Unanimous)	3	5:00	

== M-1 Challenge 79 - Shlemenko vs. Halsey 2 ==
M-1 Challenge 79 - Shlemenko vs. Halsey 2
- Promotion: M-1 Global
- Date: June 1, 2017
- Venue: Yubileyny Sports Palace
- City: Saint Petersburg, Russia

M-1 Challenge 79 - Shlemenko vs. Halsey 2 was a mixed martial arts event held by M-1 Global on June 1, 2017 at the Yubileyny Sports Palace in Saint Petersburg, Russia.

=== Result ===
M-1 Challenge 79
Weight Class				Method	Round	Time	Notes
Middleweight 84 kg	(Russia) Alexander Shlemenko	def.	(United States) Brandon Halsey	TKO (Kick to the Body and Punches)	1	0:25	
Welterweight 77 kg	(Russia) Sergey Romanov	def.	(Turkey) Arda Adas	TKO (Arm Injury)	1	4:19	
Lightweight 70 kg	(Russia) Alexey Makhno	def.	(Russia) Michel Silva	Decision (Majority)	3	5:00	
Middleweight 84 kg	(Russia) Oleg Olenichev	def.	(Spain) Enoc Solves Torres	Decision (Unanimous)	3	5:00	
Featherweight 66 kg	(Russia) Khamzat Dalgiev	def.	(England) Dragan Pešić	Submission (Heel Hook)	1	3:18	
Bantamweight 61 kg	(United States) Josh Rettinghouse	def.	(England) Baktiyar Uulu Toichubay	Submission (Rear Naked Choke)	2	4:31	
Preliminary Card
Catchweight 79 kg	(Russia) Timerlan Sharipov	def.	(Russia) Daniil Prikaza	Decision (Unanimous)	3	5:00	
Heavyweight 120 kg	(Russia) Anton Vyazigin	def.	(Ukraine) Yuriy Protzenko	Decision (Unanimous)	3	5:00	
Bantamweight 61 kg	(Russia) Bair Shtepin	def.	(South Korea) Won Jun Jang	TKO (Punches)	3	2:33	
Heavyweight 120 kg	(Ukraine) Dimitriy Mikutsa	def.	(Russia) Dmitry Tebekin	Decision (Unanimous)	3	5:00	
Lightweight 70 kg	(Russia) Nikolay Goncharov	vs.	(Belarus) Maxim Pugachev	Draw (Split)	3	5:00	
Bantamweight 61 kg	(Russia) Aleksandr Osetrov	def.	(Israel) Almog Shay	Decision (Unanimous)	3	5:00	

== M-1 Challenge 80 - Kharitonov vs. Sokoudjou ==
M-1 Challenge 80 - Kharitonov vs. Sokoudjou
- Promotion: M-1 Global
- Date: June 15, 2017
- Venue: Harbin International Convention Exhibition and Sports Center
- City: Harbin, China

M-1 Challenge 80 - Kharitonov vs. Sokoudjou was a mixed martial arts event held by M-1 Global on June 15, 2017 at the Harbin International Convention Exhibition and Sports Center in Harbin, China.

=== Result ===
M-1 Challenge 80
Weight Class				Method	Round	Time	Notes
Heavyweight 120 kg	(Russia) Sergei Kharitonov	def.	(Cameroon) Rameau Thierry Sokoudjou	KO (Punch)	1	0:40	
Featherweight 66 kg	(Slovakia) Ivan Buchinger	def.	(Russia) Timur Nagibin	Submission (Rear Naked Choke)	4	3:24	For the M-1 Featherweight Championship.
Featherweight 66 kg	(India) Sascha Sharma	def.	(China) Musu Nuertiebieke	Submission (Rear Naked Choke)	2	1:03	
Welterweight 70 kg	(Ukraine) Alexander Butenko	vs.	(Australia) Corey Nelson	Draw (Majority)	3	5:00	
Featherweight 66 kg	(Russia) Mikhail Korobkov	def.	(China) Asikerbai Jinensibieke	Submission (Triangle Choke)	2	1:18	
Preliminary Card
Light Heavyweight 93 kg	(Brazil) Carlos Eduardo	def.	(Germany) Rene Hoppe	TKO (Corner Stoppage)	1	1:06	
Middleweight 84 kg	(Russia) Artem Kazbanov	def.	(Pakistan) Nosherwan Khanzada	Decision (Unanimous)	3	5:00	
Bantamweight 61 kg	(Russia) Ibragim Navruzov	def.	(China) Huoyixibai Chuhayifu	Decision (Split)	3	5:00	
Welterweight 77 kg	(China) Kurbanjiang Tuluosibake	def.	(Ukraine) Maksim Melnik	Decision (Unanimous)	3	5:00	
Lightweight 70 kg	(Russia) Adam Tsurov	def.	(China) Kang Kang Fu	Decision (Unanimous)	3	5:00	

== M-1 Challenge 81 - Battle in the Mountains 6 ==
M-1 Challenge 81 - Battle in the Mountains 6
- Promotion: M-1 Global
- Date: July 22, 2017
- Venue: The Mountain
- City: Nazran, Russia

M-1 Challenge 81 - Battle in the Mountains 6 was a mixed martial arts event held by M-1 Global on July 22, 2017 at The Mountain in Nazran, Russia.

=== Result ===
M-1 Challenge 81
Weight Class				Method	Round	Time	Notes
Bantamweight 61 kg	(Russia) Movsar Evloev	def.	(Ukraine) Pavel Vitruk	Decision (Unanimous)	5	5:00	For the Unification of M-1 Bantamweight Championship.
Heavyweight 120 kg	(Russia) Sergei Kharitonov	def.	(Brazil) Gerônimo Dos Santos	Submission (Ankle Lock)	1	2:13	
Middleweight 84 kg	(United States) Joe Riggs	def.	(Russia) Dmitry Samoilov	TKO (Punches)	3	1:24	
Welterweight 77 kg	(Russia) Ingiskhan Ozdoev	def.	(Canada) Spencer Jebb	KO (Spinning Wheel Kick)	1	2:25	
Heavyweight 120 kg	(Brazil) Kleber Silva	def.	(Latvia) Konstantin Gluhov	Decision (Unanimous)	3	5:00	
Preliminary Card
Welterweight 77 kg	(Russia) Khamzat Sakalov	def.	(France) Charles-Henri Tchoungui	Decision (Unanimous)	3	5:00	
Flyweight 57 kg	(Kazakhstan) Arman Ashimov	def.	(Russia) Gadzhimurad Aliev	KO (Punch)	2	1:08	
Welterweight 77 kg	(Russia) Akhmadian Ozdoev	def.	(Spain) Alberto Vargas	TKO (Knee and Punches)	1	2:45	
Light Heavyweight 93 kg	(Georgia (country)) Giga Kukhalashvili	def.	(Kyrgyzstan) Nurbek Ismailov	TKO (Punches)	1	0:59	
Welterweight 77 kg	(Russia) Movsar Bokov	def.	(Ukraine) Igor Onoprienko	TKO (Punches)	1	3:43	
Lightweight 70 kg	(Russia) Alik Albogachiev	def.	(Russia) Filip Narizhnyi	Submission (Rear Naked Choke)	1	1:36	
Welterweight 77 kg	(Georgia (country)) Amiran Gogoladze	def.	(Russia) Ibrahim Sagov	Submission (Rear Naked Choke)	1	0:53	

== M-1 Challenge 82 - Vanttinen vs. Zayats ==
M-1 Challenge 82 - Vanttinen vs. Zayats
- Promotion: M-1 Global
- Date: August 5, 2017
- Venue: Hartwall Arena
- City: Helsinki, Finland

M-1 Challenge 82 - Vanttinen vs. Zayats was a mixed martial arts event held by M-1 Global on August 5, 2017 at The Hartwall Arena in Helsinki, Finland.

=== Result ===
M-1 Challenge 82
Weight Class				Method	Round	Time	Notes
Light Heavyweight 93 kg	(Russia) Mikhail Zayats	def.	(Finland) Marcus Vänttinen	Decision (Unanimous)	3	5:00	
Bantamweight 61 kg	(Finland) Janne Elonen-Kulmala	vs.	(Brazil) Heliton dos Santos	Draw (Split)	3	5:00	
Flyweight 57 kg	(Finland) Mikael Silander	def.	(Ukraine) Vitali Branchuk	Decision (Majority)	3	5:00	
Lightweight 70 kg	(Russia) Pavel Gordeev	def.	(Brazil) Michel Silva	Decision (Unanimous)	3	5:00	
Welterweight 77 kg	(Finland) Juho Valamaa	def.	(Portugal) Aires Benrois	KO (Knees)	1	4:52	
Welterweight 77 kg	(Ukraine) Alexander Butenko	def.	(United States) Keith Johnson	Decision (Unanimous)	3	5:00	
Preliminary Card
Lightweight 70 kg	(France) Arnaud Kherfallah	def.	(Finland) Patrik Pietilä	Submission (Guillotine Choke)	1	4:22	
Middleweight 84 kg	(Russia) Ruslan Shamilov	def.	(United States) Moses Murrietta	KO (Punches)	1	3:10	
Light Heavyweight 93 kg	(Moldova) Boris Polezhay	def.	(Finland) Toni Valtonen	Decision (Unanimous)	3	5:00	
Flyweight 57 kg	(Lithuania) Oleg Lichkovakha	def.	(Sweden) Son Le Binh	Decision (Unanimous)	3	5:00	
Flyweight 57 kg	(Switzerland) Frederico Gutzwiller	def.	(Georgia (country)) Akaki Khorava	Submission (Armbar)	1	1:59	
Lightweight 70 kg	(Russia) Alik Albogachiev	def.	(Russia) Filip Narizhnyi	Submission (Rear Naked Choke)	1	1:36	
Welterweight 77 kg	(Georgia (country)) Amiran Gogoladze	def.	(Russia) Ibrahim Sagov	Submission (Rear Naked Choke)	1	0:53	

== M-1 Challenge 83 - Ragozin vs. Halsey ==
M-1 Challenge 83 - Ragozin vs. Halsey
- Promotion: M-1 Global
- Date: September 23, 2017
- Venue: Basket-Hall Kazan
- City: Kazan, Russia

M-1 Challenge 83 - Ragozin vs. Halsey will be a mixed martial arts event held by M-1 Global on September 23, 2017 at The Basket-Hall Kazan in Kazan, Russia.

=== Fight Card ===
M-1 Challenge 83
Weight Class				Method	Round	Time	Notes
Light Heavyweight 93 kg	(United States) Brandon Halsey	def.	(Russia) Mikhail Ragozin	Decision (Unanimous)	3	5:00	
Flyweight 57 kg	(Ukraine) Aleksander Doskalchuk	def.	(Russia) Vadim Malygin	Submission (Guillotine Choke)	2	3:34	For the Inaugural M-1 Flyweight Championship.
Lightweight 70 kg	(Georgia (country)) Raul Tutarauli	def.	(Russia) Vladimir Kanunnikov	Decision (Unanimous)	3	5:00	
Featherweight 66 kg	(United States) Nate Landwehr	def.	(Russia) Mikhail Korobkov	KO (Punches)	2	1:31	
Bantamweight 61 kg	(Kazakhstan) Sergey Morozov	def.	(Brazil) Luan Fernandes	TKO (Punches)	2	4:48	
Preliminary Card
Lightweight 70 kg	(Russia) Viktor Kolesnik	def.	(Netherlands) Brian Hooi	TKO (Punches)	1	3:34	
Lightweight 70 kg	(Russia) Alik Albagachiev	def.	(Russia) Ruslan Khisamutdinov	Decision (Majority)	3	5:00	
Featherweight 66 kg	(Russia) Alexei Nevzorov	vs.	(Brazil) Diego D'Avila	DRAW (Split)	3	5:00	
Light Heavyweight 93 kg	(Ukraine) Vadim Shabadash	def.	(Russia) Kirill Kuzmin	Decision (Unanimous)	3	5:00	
Bantamweight 61 kg	(Russia) Aleksandr Osetrov	def.	(Russia) Lenar Suleymanov	Decision (Unanimous)	3	5:00	
Welterweight 77 kg	(Russia) Vadim Sinitsyn	def.	(Russia) Timur Gilimzyanov	Decision (Unanimous)	2	5:00	
Catchweight 63 kg	(Russia) Nidzhat Imanov	def.	(Russia) Rinat Shakirov	TKO (Punches)	2	2:06	

== M-1 Challenge 84 - Kunchenko vs. Romanov ==
M-1 Challenge 84 - Kunchenko vs. Romanov
- Promotion: M-1 Global
- Date: October 27, 2017
- Venue: Ice Palace
- City: Saint Petersburg, Russia

M-1 Challenge 84 - Kunchenko vs. Romanov will be a mixed martial arts event held by M-1 Global on October 27, 2017 at The Ice Palace in Saint Petersburg, Russia.

=== Results ===
M-1 Challenge 84
Weight Class				Method	Round	Time	Notes
Welterweight 77 kg	(Russia) Alexey Kunchenko	def.	(Russia) Sergey Romanov	TKO (Punches)	1	2:35	For the M-1 Welterweight Championship.
Middleweight 84 kg	(Russia) Artem Frolov	def.	(Brazil) Caio Magalhães	Decision (Unanimous)	5	5:00	For the Vacant M-1 Middleweight Championship.
Middleweight 84 kg	(United States) Joe Riggs	def.	(Russia) Oleg Olenichev	TKO (Punches)	3	3:21	
Bantamweight 61 kg	(Kazakhstan) Bair Shtepin	def.	(Finland) Janne Elonen-Kulmala	Submission (Triangle Choke)	3	4:43	
Lightweight 70 kg	(Russia) Roman Bogatov	def.	(Finland) Jani Salmi	Decision (Unanimous)	3	5:00	
Preliminary Card
Middleweight 84 kg	(Russia) Andrey Seledtsov	def.	(Spain) Enoc Solves Torres	Submission (Armbar)	1	0:44	
Heavyweight 120 kg	(England) Phil De Fries	def.	(Russia) Anton Vyazigin	Decision (Majority)	3	5:00	
Featherweight 66 kg	(Russia) Zalimbeg Omarov	def.	(India) Sascha Sharma	Decision (Unanimous)	3	5:00	
Welterweight 77 kg	(Russia) Danila Prikaza	def.	(Russia) Akhmadian Ozdoev	Decision (Unanimous)	3	5:00	
Welterweight 77 kg	(Russia) Maksim Grabovich	def.	(Russia) Temirlan Sharipov	Submission (Rear Naked Choke)	3	1:57	
Light Heavyweight 93 kg	(Russia) Dmitry Tebekin	def.	(Russia) Vasily Volodko	Decision (Unanimous)	3	5:00	
Heavyweight 120 kg	(Russia) Ilya Bochkov	def.	(Russia) Arkadiy Lisin	TKO (Punches)	2	4:23	

== M-1 Challenge 85: Ismagulov vs. Matias ==
M-1 Challenge 85: Ismagulov vs. Matias
- Promotion: M-1 Global
- Date: November 10, 2017
- Venue: Olimpiyskiy
- City: Moscow, Russia

M-1 Challenge 85: Ismagulov vs. Matias will be a mixed martial arts event held by M-1 Global on November 10, 2017 at The Olimpiyskiy in Moscow, Russia.

=== Background ===
Originally Damir Ismagulov was going to defend his title against the number one contender Raul Tutarauli, but unfortunately Tutarauli got injured. So Ismagulov fight was a non-title bout against Rogério Matias from Brazil.

Stephan Puetz unfortunately got injured just a few days before the event, so another fighter from Germany has taken his place, Sebastian Heil steep in on a short notice to face Giga Kukhalashvili.

=== Fight Card ===
M-1 Challenge 85
Weight Class				Method	Round	Time	Notes
Lightweight 70 kg	(Kazakhstan) Damir Ismagulov (c)	def.	(Brazil) Rogério Matias	Decision (Unanimous)	3	5:00	Non Title Fight
Featherweight 66 kg	(United States) Nate Landwehr	def.	(Russia) Viktor Kolesnik	Decision (Split)	3	5:00	
Lightweight 70 kg	(Russia) Abubakar Mestoev	def.	(Russia) Alexey Makhno	KO (punches)	1	1:06	
Light Heavyweight 93 kg	(Georgia (country)) Giga Kukhalashvili	def.	(Germany) Sebastian Heil	TKO (punches)	1	0:36	
Flyweight 57 kg	(Kazakhstan) Arman Ashimov	def.	(Brazil) Rodrigo Melônio	KO (Punches)	1	3:27	
Preliminary Card
Lightweight 70 kg	(Russia) Ruslan Rakhmonkulov	def.	(Ukraine) Maxim Divnich	Decision (Split)	3	5:00	
Bantamweight 61 kg	(United States) Josh Rettinghouse	def.	(Ukraine) Aleksandr Lunga	Decision (Split)	3	5:00	
Middleweight 84 kg	(Ukraine) Vitaliy Slipenko	def.	(Croatia) Kristijan Perak	Submission (Rear Naked Choke)	2	2:19	
Featherweight 66 kg	(Ukraine) Andrey Lezhnev	def.	(Russia) Ilfat Amirov	Decision (Split)	3	5:00	
Bantamweight 61 kg	(Russia) Sergey Klyuev	def.	(Spain) Oscar Suarez	Submission (Armbar)	1	0:45	
Heavyweight 120 kg	(Russia) Maksim Yakobyuk	def.	(Russia) Viktor Trushov	Submission (Arm-Triangle Choke)	2	1:16	
Bantamweight 61 kg	(Georgia (country)) Vazha Tsiptauri	def.	(Switzerland) Frederico Gutzwiller	Submission (Guillotine Choke)	3	0:32	

== M-1 Challenge 86 - Buchinger vs. Dalgiev ==
M-1 Challenge 86 - Buchinger vs. Dalgiev
- Promotion: M-1 Global
- Date: November 24, 2017
- Venue: Sports Palace "Magas"
- City: Nazran, Russia

M-1 Challenge 86 - Buchinger vs. Dalgiev will be a mixed martial arts event held by M-1 Global on November 24, 2017 at The Sports Palace "Magas" in Nazran, Russia.

=== Fight Card ===
M-1 Challenge 86
Weight Class				Method	Round	Time	Notes
Featherweight 66 kg	(Russia) Khamzat Dalgiev	def.	(Slovakia) Ivan Buchinger (c)	KO(Punches)	1	2:35	For the M-1 Featherweight Championship.
Catchweight 89 kg	(United States) Joseph Henle	def.	(Russia) Mikhail Ragozin	KO (Punches)	3	4:59	
Lightweight 70 kg	(Finland) Aleksi Mäntykivi	def.	(Russia) Bashir Gagiev	Submission (Guillotine Choke)	2	1:06	
Flyweight 57 kg	(Canada) Chris Kelades	def.	(Lithuania) Oleg Lichkovakha	Submission (Kimura)	3	1:38	
Lightweight 70 kg	(Kyrgyzstan) Busurmankul Abdibait uulu	def.	(Brazil) Diego Davella	TKO (Punches)	1	4:14	
Preliminary Card
Lightweight 70 kg	(Brazil) Rubenilton Pereira	def.	(Russia) Lom-Ali Nalgiev	KO (Punches)	1	3:28	
Catchweight 80 kg	(Ukraine) Alexander Butenko	def.	(Uzbekistan) Elerzhan Narmurzaev	Submission (Armbar)	1	5:00	
Heavyweight 120 kg	(Azerbaijan) Zaur Gadzhibabayev	def.	(Russia) Nikolay Savilov	KO (Punches)	1	4:33	
Lightweight 70 kg	(France) Arnaud Kherfallah	def.	(Russia) Vakha Shanhoev	Submission (Guillotine Choke)	1	1:48	
Featherweight 66 kg	(Georgia (country)) Soso Nizharadze	def.	(Russia) Adam Gagiev	Decision (Unanimous)	3	5:00	
Catchweight 68 kg	(Ukraine) Yuriy Chobuka	def.	(Russia) Akhmadkhan Bokov	Submission (Guillotine Choke)	1	2:13	
Bantamweight 61 kg	(Russia) Selem Evloev	def.	(Ukraine) Dmitriy Orlov	TKO (Punches)	1	4:33	
