= 2020 in M-1 Global =

Mixed martial arts events

Information
- First date: January 31, 2020

The year 2020 is the 23nd year in the history of the M-1 Global, a mixed martial arts promotion based in Russia.

== List of events ==
M-1 Global
No.	Event	Date	Venue	Location	Ref
1	Road to M-1 USA 4	January 31, 2020	Charles F. Dodge City Center	Pembroke Pines, Florida, United States	
2	MMA SERIES-10: WKG & M-1 Online	July 18, 2020	Tinkoff Arena	St. Petersburg, Russia	
3	M-1 Selection Online: Tournament in Support of Maksim Shugaley	September 11, 2020	Tinkoff Arena	St. Petersburg, Russia	

== Road to M-1 USA 4 ==
Road to M-1 USA 4
- Promotion: M-1 Global
- Date: January 31, 2020
- Venue: Charles F. Dodge City Center
- City: Pembroke Pines, Florida, United States

Road to M-1 USA 4 will be a mixed martial arts event held by M-1 Global on January 31, 2020, at the Charles F. Dodge City Center in Pembroke Pines, Florida, United States.

=== Fight Card ===
M-1 Challenge
Weight Class				Method	Round	Time	Notes
Lightweight 70 kg	(United States) Michael Lombardo	def.	(United States) Jose Caceres	Decision (Unanimous)	3	5:00	
Bantamweight 61 kg	(Brazil) Paulo Sergio Santos	def.	(United States) Edward Massey	Submission (Rear-Naked Choke)	2	4:04	
Welterweight 77 kg	(United States) Kendly St. Louis	def.	(Dominican Republic) John Michael Escoboza	TKO	3	1:33	
Welterweight 77 kg	(United States) Carlos Espinosa	def.	(United States) Michael Rodriguez	Decision (Unanimous)	3	5:00	
Bantamweight 61 kg	(United States) Sal Guerriero	def.	(United States) Ray Paige	Decision (Unanimous)	3	5:00	
Lightweight 70 kg	(United States) Chamy Delva	def.	(United States) Clarence Brown	Submission (Arm-Triangle Choke)	1	1:59	

== MMA SERIES-10 – WKG & M-1 Online ==
MMA SERIES-10 – WKG & M-1 Online
- Promotion: M-1 Global
- Date: July 18, 2020
- Venue: Tinkoff Arena
- City: St. Petersburg, Russia

MMA SERIES-10 – WKG & M-1 Online was a mixed martial arts event held by M-1 Global on July 18, 2020, at the Tinkoff Arena in St. Petersburg, Russia.

=== Results ===
M-1 Challenge 101
Weight Class				Method	Round	Time	Notes
Welterweight 77 kg	(Russia) Mikhail Doroshenko	def.	(Russia) Magomed Magomedov	Decision (Split)	3	5:00	
Light Heavyweight 93 kg	(Azerbaijan) Tahir Abdullaev	def.	(Tajikistan) Kishvar Khudoyerov	TKO (Punches)	1	1:15	
Catchweight 71 kg	(Russia) Aleksandr Dontsov	def.	(Tajikistan) Oyatullo Muminov	Decision (Unanimous)	3	5:00	
Lightweight 70 kg	(Russia) Aslambek Kodzhaev	def.	(Russia) Magomed Magomedov	TKO (Punches)	1	3:55	
Middleweight 84 kg	(Azerbaijan) Gadzhimurad Purtiev	def.	(Russia) Vitaly Tverdokhlebov	Decision (Unanimous)	3	5:00	
Heavyweight 120 kg	(Kyrgyzstan) Azamat Zhumanazarov	def.	(Russia) Abdul-Malik Dzhamalov	KO (Punch to the Body)	3	0:25	
Catchweight 63 kg	(Russia) Zandan Tsydenov	def.	(Russia) Arsen Shibzukhov	Decision (Unanimous)	3	5:00	
Lightweight 70 kg	(Kyrgyzstan) Nurzhigit Karaev	def.	(Russia) Said Gadzhiev	TKO (Corner Stoppage)	2	5:00	
Middleweight 84 kg	(Russia) Valentin Orlov	def.	(Kyrgyzstan) Islambek Bakyev	Decision (Unanimous)	3	5:00	
Flyweight 57 kg	(Russia) Nikolay Chernyshev	def.	(Uzbekistan) Muslim Dzhurabaev	Submission (Triangle Choke)	1	2:07	
Bantamweight 61 kg	(Kazakhstan) Konstantin Cherednichenko	def.	(Russia) Sergey Lukashuk	Submission (Keylock)	1	1:40	

== M-1 Selection Online – Tournament in Support of Maksim Shugaley ==
M-1 Selection Online – Tournament in Support of Maksim Shugaley
- Promotion: M-1 Global
- Date: September 11, 2020
- Venue: Tinkoff Arena
- City: St. Petersburg, Russia

M-1 Selection Online – Tournament in Support of Maksim Shugaley was a mixed martial arts event held by M-1 Global on September 11, 2020, at the Tinkoff Arena in St. Petersburg, Russia.

=== Results ===
M-1 Challenge 101
Weight Class				Method	Round	Time	Notes
Welterweight 77 kg	(Azerbaijan) Zaur Gadzhibabayev	def.	(Russia) Ismail Sagov	TKO (Punches)	2	2:05	
Light Heavyweight 93 kg	(Russia) Vadim Malygin	def.	(Uzbekistan) Mumin Shakirov	Decision (Unanimous)	3	5:00	
Flyweight 57 kg	(Russia) Alexander Podmarev	def.	(Uzbekistan) Shokhrukh Ilkhomov	TKO (Punches)	2	1:50	
Catchweight 71 kg	(Russia) Aleksandr Dontsov	def.	(Russia) Valentin Orlov	Decision (Unanimous)	3	5:00	
Preliminary Card
Lightweight 70 kg	(Russia) Nikolay Chernyshev	def.	(Kyrgyzstan) Bekmirza Pirimberdi Uulu	TKO (Punches)	2	1:45	
Heavyweight 120 kg	(Tajikistan) Oyatullo Muminov	def.	(Kyrgyzstan) Zamirbek Beksultan	TKO (Punches)	1	1:34	
Catchweight 63 kg	(Russia) Vitaliy Chesnokov	def.	(Uzbekistan) Shermukhammad Mukhamadjanov	Submission (Rear-Naked choke)	3	2:17	
Lightweight 70 kg	(Russia) Miri Sadygov	def.	(Kyrgyzstan) Nurzhigit Karaev	TKO (Punches)	1	0:46	
Middleweight 84 kg	(Russia) Maksim Kuldashev	def.	(Russia) Evgeniy Konkin	Submission (Guillotine Choke)	1	0:29	

== See also ==
- 2020 in UFC
- 2020 in Bellator MMA
- 2020 in ONE Championship
- 2020 in Absolute Championship Akhmat
- 2020 in Konfrontacja Sztuk Walki
- 2020 in RXF
