= 2019 in M-1 Global =

Mixed martial arts events

Information
- First date: January 26, 2019

The year 2019 is the 22nd year in the history of the M-1 Global, a mixed martial arts promotion based in Russia.

== List of events ==
M-1 Global
No.	Event	Date	Venue	Location	Ref
1	M-1 Challenge/ WKG 3 - Bogatov vs. Silva	January 26, 2019	Nanshan Culture & Sports Center	Harbin, China	
2	M-1 Challenge 101 - Prikaza vs. Rakhmonov	March 30, 2019	Halyk Arena	Almaty, Kazakhstan	
3	Road To M-1 USA 2	April 4, 2019	Quechan Casino Resort	Winterhaven, California, United States	
4	Road To M-1	April 6, 2019	Chelyabinsk Palace Of Culture	Chelyabinsk, Russia	
5	M-1 Challenge 102 - Rakhmonov vs. Lacerda	June 28, 2019	Barys Arena	Nur-Sultan, Kazakhstan	
6	M-1 Challenge 103 - Pletenko vs. Kelades	August 3, 2019		Shenzhen, China	
7	M-1 Challenge 104 - Bogatov vs. Lebout	September 28, 2019	Orenburzhye Sport Arena	Kazan, Russia	
8	Road To M-1 USA 3	October 11, 2019	Paducah Convention Center	Paducah, Kentucky, United States	
9	M-1 Challenge 105 - Morozov vs. Rettinghouse	October 19, 2019	Barys Arena	Nur-Sultan, Kazakhstan	

== M-1 Challenge/ WKG 3 - Bogatov vs. Silva ==
M-1 Challenge/ WKG 3 - Bogatov vs. Silva
- Promotion: M-1 Global
- Date: January 26, 2019
- Venue: Nanshan Culture & Sports Center
- City: Shenzhen, China

M-1 Challenge/ WKG 3 - Bogatov vs. Silva will be a mixed martial arts event held by M-1 Global on January 26, 2019 at the Nanshan Culture & Sports Center in Shenzhen, China.

=== Background ===
This event will feature a world title fight for the M-1 Lightweight Championship between the champ Roman Bogatov and top contender Michel Silva as M-1 Challenge headliner.

=== Fight Card ===
M-1 Challenge
Weight Class				Method	Round	Time	Notes
Lightweight 70 kg	(Russia) Roman Bogatov (c)	def.	(Brazil) Michel Silva	Submission (Arm Triangle Choke)	2	3:09	For the M-1 Lightweight Championship
Bantamweight 61 kg	(China) Huoyixibai Chuhayifu	def.	(United States) Edward Massey	TKO (Referee Stoppage)	3	4:32	
Welterweight 77 kg	(Ukraine) Alexander Butenko	def.	(Brazil) Gian Siqueira	Decision (Majority)	3	5:00	
Welterweight 77 kg	(Brazil) Tiago Varejão	def.	(China) Kurbanjiang Tuluosibake	TKO (Punches)	1	0:40	
Bantamweight 61 kg	(Georgia (country)) Vazha Tsiptauri		(Brazil) Rafael Dias	Draw (Majority)	3	5:00	
M-1 Selection 33
Lightweight 70 kg	(Georgia (country)) Raul Tutarauli	def.	(Cuba) Yoislandy Izquierdo	Submission (Neck Crank)	3	3:47	
Flyweight 57 kg	(Greece) Elina Kallionidou	def.	(China) Yan Qihui	KO(Knee and Punches)	3	0:21	
Light Heavyweight 93 kg	(Russia) Dmitry Tebekin	def.	(Poland) Marcin Łazarz	Decision (Unanimous)	3	5:00	
Featherweight 66 kg	(Russia) Akhmadkhan Bokov	def.	(China) Fu Kang Kang	Decision (Unanimous)	3	5:00	
Catchweight 68 kg	(United States) Daniel Swain	def.	(Ukraine) Maxim Pashkov	Submission (Armbar)	1	4:53	

== M-1 Challenge 101 - Prikaza vs. Rakhmonov ==
M-1 Challenge 101 - Prikaza vs. Rakhmonov
- Promotion: M-1 Global
- Date: March 30, 2019
- Venue: Halyk Arena
- City: Almaty, Kazakhstan

M-1 Challenge 101 - Prikaza vs. Rakhmonov was a mixed martial arts event held by M-1 Global on March 30, 2019 at the Halyk Arena in Almaty, Kazakhstan.

=== Results ===
M-1 Challenge 101
Weight Class				Method	Round	Time	Notes
Welterweight 77 kg	(Kazakhstan) Shavkat Rakhmonov	def.	(Russia) Danila Prikaza	TKO (Punches)	2	2:20	For the vacant M-1 Welterweight Championship
Light Heavyweight 93 kg	(Russia) Khadis Ibragimov (c)	def.	(Poland) Rafał Kijańczuk	TKO (Punches)	1	2:30	For the M-1 Light Heavyweight Championship
Flyweight 57 kg	(Kazakhstan) Arman Ashimov	def.	(Brazil) Kayck Alencar	Decision (Unanimous)	3	5:00	
Catchweight 71 kg	(France) Anthony Dizy	def.	(Russia) Abubakar Mestoev	Decision (Majority)	3	5:00	
Lightweight 70 kg	(France) Mickaël Lebout	def.	(Russia) Alik Albogachiev	Submission (Rear-Naked choke)	2	2:50	
Middleweight 84 kg	(Brazil) Jean Patrick	def.	(Russia) Denis Tiuliulin	Decision (Split)	3	5:00	
Heavyweight 120 kg	(Azerbaijan) Zaur Gadzhibabayev		(Canada) Tanner Boser	Draw (Majority)	3	5:00	
Catchweight 63 kg	(United States) George Garcia	def.	(Ukraine) Yuriy Chobuka	Submission (Rear-Naked choke)	3	4:40	
Lightweight 70 kg	(Kazakhstan) Azamat Bakytov	def.	(Russia) Boris Medvedev	Decision (Unanimous)	3	5:00	
Middleweight 84 kg	(Ukraine) Vadim Shabadash	def.	(Russia) Ivan Bogdanov	TKO (Punches)	1	3:55	
Preliminary Card
Flyweight 57 kg	(Kazakhstan) Asu Almabayev	def.	(France) Pierre Ludet	Submission (Guillotine Choke)	2	1:50	
Bantamweight 61 kg	(Kazakhstan) Abylaykhan Kadirzhan	def.	(Georgia (country)) Maxim Pashkov	TKO (Punches)	1	0:53	

== Road To M-1 USA 2 ==
Road To M-1 USA 2
- Promotion: M-1 Global
- Date: April 04, 2019
- Venue: Quechan Casino Resort
- City: Winterhaven, California, United States

Road To M-1 USA 2 was a mixed martial arts event held by M-1 Global on April 4, 2019 at Quechan Casino Resort in Winterhaven, California, United States.

=== Fight Card ===
M-1 Challenge
Weight Class				Method	Round	Time	Notes
Welterweight 77 kg	(United States) Dakota Cochrane	def.	(United States) James Warfield-Lane	Submission (Guillotine Choke)	1	1:19	For the M-1 USA Welterweight Championship
Featherweight 66 kg	(United States) Jamall Emmers	def.	(Brazil) Caio Machado	TKO (Retirement)	1	5:00	
Heavyweight 120 kg	(United States) Travis Wiuff	def.	(United States) JR Lugo	Decision (Unanimous)	3	5:00	
Women's Strawweight 52 kg	(Norway) Celine Haga	def.	(United States) Jenny Clausius	Decision (Unanimous)	3	5:00	
Featherweight 66 kg	(United States) Ronee Dizon	def.	(Mexico) Joe Gustina	Submission (Rear-Naked Choke)	2	1:17	
Heavyweight 120 kg	(United States) Travis Fulton	def.	(United States) Shannon Ritch	Submission (Forearm Choke)	2	0:41	
Bantamweight 61 kg	(Cuba) Enzo Perez	def.	(United States) Nick Alwag	TKO (Doctor Stoppage)	1	4:48	
Preliminary Card
Middleweight 84 kg	(United States) Deon Clash	def.	(United States) Jose Galaviz	Submission (Kimura)	1	1:44	

== Road To M-1 ==
Road To M-1
- Promotion: M-1 Global
- Date: April 06, 2019
- Venue: Chelyabinsk Palace Of Culture
- City: Chelyabinsk, Russia

Road To M-1 was a mixed martial arts event held by M-1 Global on April 6, 2019 at the Chelyabinsk Palace Of Culture in Chelyabinsk, Russia.

=== Fight Card ===
M-1 Challenge
Weight Class				Method	Round	Time	Notes
Heavyweight 120 kg	(Russia) Yuriy Fedorov	def.	(Russia) Sergey Goltsov	KO	2	2:09	
Featherweight 66 kg	(Russia) Gleb Khabibullin	def.	(Russia) Denis Sulimov	Decision (Unanimous)	3	5:00	
Women's Bantamweight 61 kg	(Russia) Anna Emelyanenko	def.	(Russia) Ksenia Stepanova	Submission (Choke)	2	1:00	
Featherweight 66 kg	(Russia) Viktor Mitkov	def.	(Russia) Evgeny Bondarev	Decision (Unanimous)	3	5:00	
Welterweight 77 kg	(Uzbekistan) Amrillo Dzhuraev	def.	(Russia) David Zakaryan	Submission (Choke)	1	4:30	
Featherweight 66 kg	(Russia) Alberd Zhapuev	def.	(Turkey) Emil Abasov	Decision (Unanimous)	3	5:00	
Bantamweight 61 kg	(Russia) Bogar Klos	def.	(Russia) Dmitriy Romanov	Decision (Unanimous)	3	5:00	
Heavyweight 120 kg	(Russia) Maxim Kolosov	def.	(Russia) Mikhail Pedko	KO	1	4:40	
Flyweight 57 kg	(Kyrgyzstan) Bekulan Saipzhanov	def.	(Russia) Daniil Bukreev	KO	1	1:39	
Light Heavyweight 93 kg	(Russia) Ivan Khudinsha	def.	(Russia) Alexander Laptev	Submission (Choke)	1	1:20	
Featherweight 66 kg	(Russia) Khas-Magomed Kharsiev	def.	(Russia) Roman Arakelyan	Decision (Unanimous)	3	5:00	

== M-1 Challenge 102 - Rakhmonov vs. Lacerda ==
M-1 Challenge 102 - Rakhmonov vs. Lacerda
- Promotion: M-1 Global
- Date: June 28, 2019
- Venue: Barys Arena
- City: Nur-Sultan, Kazakhstan

M-1 Challenge 102 - Rakhmonov vs. Lacerda was a mixed martial arts event held by M-1 Global on June 28, 2019 at the Barys Arena in Nur-Sultan, Kazakhstan.

=== Fight Card ===
M-1 Challenge
Weight Class				Method	Round	Time	Notes
Welterweight 77 kg	(Kazakhstan) Shavkat Rakhmonov (c)	def.	(Brazil) Tiago Varejão	TKO (Punches)	1	4:50	For the M-1 Welterweight Championship
Bantamweight 61 kg	(Kazakhstan) Sergey Morozov	def.	(Russia) Aleksandr Osetrov	TKO (Punches)	4	1:40	For the M-1 Bantamweight Championship
Welterweight 77 kg	(United States) Nate Landwehr (c)	def.	(Russia) Viktor Kolesnik	Decision (Unanimous)	5	5:00	For the M-1 Featherweight Championship
Lightweight 70 kg	(Georgia (country)) Raul Tutarauli	def.	(Brazil) Rubenilton Pereira	KO (Punches)	1	1:37	
Bantamweight 61 kg	(Ukraine) Dmitriy Mikutsa	def.	(Germany) Robert Lau	Decision (Unanimous)	3	5:00	
Lightweight 70 kg	(Russia) Sergey Romanov	def.	(Brazil) Marcio Cabral	Submission	1	4:38	
Flyweight 57 kg	(Kazakhstan) Isatay Temirov	def.	(Canada) Spencer Jebb	Decision (Split)	3	5:00	
Light Heavyweight 93 kg	(Cuba) Yoislandy Izquierdo	def.	(Russia) Alexey Ilyenko	Disqualification (Illegal Kick)	2	0:47	
Featherweight 66 kg	(Kazakhstan) Goity Dazaev	def.	(Ukraine) Alexander Butenko	Decision (Unanimous)	3	5:00	
Catchweight 68 kg	(Russia) Ruslan Shamilov	def.	(Russia) Vladimir Trusov	TKO (Punches)	2	0:40	
Flyweight 57 kg	(Kazakhstan) Sabit Zhusupov	def.	(Spain) Aridane Romero Rodriguez	TKO (Punches)	3	1:20	
Light Heavyweight 93 kg	(Kazakhstan) Ismail Geroev	def.	(Ukraine) Aleksey Sotnikov	Submission (Rear-Naked choke)	1	4:40	
Featherweight 66 kg	(Azerbaijan) Tahir Abdullaev	def.	(Kazakhstan) Makhir Aliev	Submission (Armbar)	2	3:57	

== M-1 Challenge 103 - Pletenko vs. Kelades ==
M-1 Challenge 103 - Pletenko vs. Kelades
- Promotion: M-1 Global
- Date: August 3, 2019
- City: Shenzhen, China

M-1 Challenge 103 - Pletenko vs. Kelades was a mixed martial arts event held by M-1 Global on August 3, 2019 in Shenzhen, China.

=== Fight Card ===
M-1 Challenge
Weight Class				Method	Round	Time	Notes
Bantamweight 61 kg	(Canada) Chris Kelades	def.	(Ukraine) Alexander Pletenko	Decision (Unanimous)	3	5:00	For the M-1 Interim Flyweight Championship
Bantamweight 61 kg	(China) Huoyixibai Chuhayifu	def.	(Georgia (country)) Beno Adamia	TKO (Punches)	1	4:41	
Welterweight 77 kg	(Russia) Maksim Grabovich	def.	(Brazil) Jonas Boeno	Decision (Unanimous)	3	5:00	
Welterweight 77 kg	(Brazil) Roggers Souza	def.	(Azerbaijan) Zaur Gadzhibabayev	Decision (Split)	3	5:00	
Bantamweight 61 kg	(United States) Hayder Hassan	def.	(Russia) Movsar Bokov	Decision (Unanimous)	3	5:00	
Lightweight 70 kg	(China) Pengzhao Feng	def.	(United States) Edward Massey	Decision (Unanimous)	3	5:00	
Flyweight 57 kg	(United States) Daniel Swain	def.	(China) Xiaolong Wu	KO(Knee and Punches)	3	0:21	
Light Heavyweight 93 kg	(Sweden) Andreas Stahl	def.	(Germany) Christian Jungwirth	Submission (Guillotine Choke)	1	0:28	
Preliminary Card
Featherweight 66 kg	(Russia) Nikolay Goncharov	def.	(China) Maheshate	Decision (Unanimous)	3	5:00	
Catchweight 68 kg	(Brazil) Kayck Alencar	def.	(China) Zhen Wang	Decision (Unanimous)	3	5:00	

== M-1 Challenge 104 - Bogatov vs. Lebout ==
M-1 Challenge 104 - Bogatov vs. Lebout
- Promotion: M-1 Global
- Date: August 30, 2019
- Venue: Sports ArenA
- City: Orenburg, Russia

M-1 Challenge 104 - Bogatov vs. Lebout was a mixed martial arts event held by M-1 Global on August 30, 2019 at the Sports ArenA in Orenburg, Russia.

=== Fight Card ===
M-1 Challenge
Weight Class				Method	Round	Time	Notes
Lightweight 70 kg	(Russia) Roman Bogatov (c)	def.	(France) Mickael Lebout	TKO (Shoulder injury)	3	5:00	For the M-1 Lightweight Championship
Bantamweight 61 kg	(Kyrgyzstan) Busurmankul Abdibait Uulu	def.	(Ukraine) Andrey Lezhnev	Decision (Majority)	3	5:00	
Welterweight 77 kg	(Kazakhstan) Arman Ashimov	def.	(Brazil) Flávio Santos	Decision (Unanimous)	3	5:00	
Welterweight 77 kg	(Georgia (country)) Vazha Tsiptauri	def.	(Russia) Selem Evloev	Decision (Unanimous)	3	5:00	
Bantamweight 61 kg	(Ukraine) Boris Polezhay	def.	(Brazil) Jean Patrick	Decision (Unanimous)	3	5:00	
Preliminary Card
Women's Lightweight 70 kg	(Russia) Asia Klyutova	def.	(Russia) Zarina Gumerova	Submission (Guillotine Choke)	1	1:50	
Flyweight 57 kg	(Russia) Mikhail Doroshenko	def.	(Azerbaijan) Bayram Mamedov	Submission	2	4:08	
Featherweight 66 kg	(France) Anthony Dizy	def.	(Russia) Zalimbeg Omarov	TKO (Punches)	3	3:53	
Catchweight 68 kg	(Russia) Bair Shtepin	def.	(United States) George Garcia	Decision (Unanimous)	3	5:00	

== Road To M-1 USA 3 ==
Road To M-1 USA 3
- Promotion: M-1 Global
- Date: October 11, 2019
- Venue: Paducah Convention Center
- City: Paducah, Kentucky, United States

Road To M-1 USA 3 was a mixed martial arts event held by M-1 Global on October 11, 2019 at Paducah Convention Center in Paducah, Kentucky, United States.

=== Fight Card ===
M-1 Challenge
Weight Class				Method	Round	Time	Notes
Welterweight 77 kg	(United States) Tony Lopez	def.	(United States) D.J. Linderman	KO (Head Kick)	1	2:59	
Featherweight 66 kg	(United States) Cody Goodale	def.	(United States) Dustin Clements	Submission (Arm-Triangle Choke)	1	1:40	
Heavyweight 120 kg	(United States) Kegan Agnew	def.	(Puerto Rico) Jomal Rodriguez	TKO (Elbows and Punches)	2	4:04	
Women's Strawweight 52 kg	(United States) Jenny Clausius	def.	(United States) Taylor Jenkins	TKO (Punch)	3	2:45	
Featherweight 66 kg	(United States) Chris Johnson	def.	(United States) Solon Staley	Decision (Split)	3	5:00	

== M-1 Challenge 105 - Morozov vs. Rettinghouse ==
M-1 Challenge 105 - Morozov vs. Rettinghouse
- Promotion: M-1 Global
- Date: October 19, 2019
- Venue: Barys Arena
- City: Nur-Sultan, Kazakhstan

M-1 Challenge 105 - Morozov vs. Rettinghouse was a mixed martial arts event held by M-1 Global on October 19, 2019 at the Barys Arena in Nur-Sultan, Kazakhstan.

=== Fight Card ===
M-1 Challenge
Weight Class				Method	Round	Time	Notes
Lightweight 70 kg	(Kazakhstan) Sergey Morozov (c)	def.	(United States) Josh Rettinghouse	Decision (Unanimous)	5	5:00	For the M-1 Bantamweight Championship
Bantamweight 61 kg	(Kazakhstan) Asu Almabayev	def.	(Canada) Chris Kelades	Decision (Unanimous)	5	5:00	For the M-1 Interim Flyweight Championship
Welterweight 77 kg	(Belarus) Artiom Damkovsky	def.	(Russia) Vladimir Kanunnikov	Decision (Unanimous)	3	5:00	
Welterweight 77 kg	(Brazil) Michel Silva	def.	(Russia) Khamzat Dalgiev	TKO (Punches)	1	1:48	
Bantamweight 61 kg	(Russia) Daniil Prikaza		(Kazakhstan) Isatay Temirov	Draw (Split)	3	5:00	
Preliminary Card
Lightweight 70 kg	(Brazil) Rafael Dias	def.	(Kyrgyzstan) Zalkarbek Zarlyk Uulu	Decision (Split)	3	5:00	
Flyweight 57 kg	(Russia) Yuriy Fedorov	def.	(Cuba) Michel Batista	Submission (Guillotine Choke)	1	4:06	
Light Heavyweight 93 kg	(Russia) Magomedkamil Malikov	def.	(Brazil) Rubenilton Pereira	KO (Punch)	2	1:21	
Featherweight 66 kg	(Kazakhstan) Sabit Zhusupov	def.	(Russia) Gleb Khabibulin	Decision (Unanimous)	3	5:00	
Catchweight 68 kg	(Sweden) Per Franklin		(Azerbaijan) Gadzhibaba Gadzhibabaev	Draw (Split)	3	5:00	
Light Heavyweight 93 kg	(Kazakhstan) Zhuman Zhumabekov	def.	(Kyrgyzstan) Ruslan Kudaiberdiev	Decision (Unanimous)	3	5:00	
Featherweight 66 kg	(Kazakhstan) Azamat Markabaev	def.	(Georgia (country)) Beka Gogaladze	Submission (Rear-Naked Choke)	2	2:48	

== See also ==
- 2019 in UFC
- 2019 in Bellator MMA
- 2019 in ONE Championship
- 2019 in Absolute Championship Akhmat
- 2019 in Konfrontacja Sztuk Walki
- 2019 in RXF
