= Mixed martial arts in Russia =

- Country: Russia
- Governing body: Union of Mixed Martial Arts "MMA" of Russia
- National team: Russia

Mixed martial arts in Russia are one of the most practiced sports.

== History ==
Wrestling is considered an important component of Russian MMA due to its effectiveness in the sport. Another popular martial art form is sambo, which originated in the Soviet Union.

The Republic of Dagestan, in recent years, has produced numerous mixed martial arts fighters who have made a place for themselves in the big leagues. In fact, it is worth noting that Khabib Nurmagomedov, who was the first Russian and Muslim to win a UFC world championship and retired undefeated, has trained part of his career in Dagestan.

MMA in the country was given 'National Sport' status in September 2012, and on the same day fighter and M-1 Global promoter Fedor Emelianenko was appointed to the role of Russian MMA Union president.

In February 2022, after the Russian invasion of Ukraine, the International Mixed Martial Arts Federation (IMMAF) suspended the membership of the Russian MMA Union. It barred the Russian Federation from participating in all IMMAF Championships, and banned the organization of events in Russia.

== Organizations ==
The main MMA organizations in Russia are the following:

- M-1 Global
- AMC Fight Nights
- Absolute Championship Akhmat
- Eagle Fighting Championship
- R-1 Federation
- Eagles MMA
- Fight Club Akhmat

Russian MMA Union is the main regulator dedicated to the popularization and development of the sport in the country. Until its suspension in 2022, was a member of the International Mixed Martial Arts Federation (IMMAF) with Radmir Gabdullin as president.
