= RC-1 =

The term "RC-1" may refer to:

- Boeing RC-1, a concept aircraft for transporting oil and minerals
- RC-1, a remote control for the Canon EOS 100 camera.
- The first release candidate for a piece of software.

== See also ==
- RC (disambiguation)
- C1 (disambiguation)
- R1 (disambiguation)
