= 2026 Perm Krai legislative election =

Regional legislative election in Russia

- 18–20 September 2026

All 60 seats in the Legislative Assembly 31 seats needed for a majority
- Turnout: 46.39% ▲8.04 pp
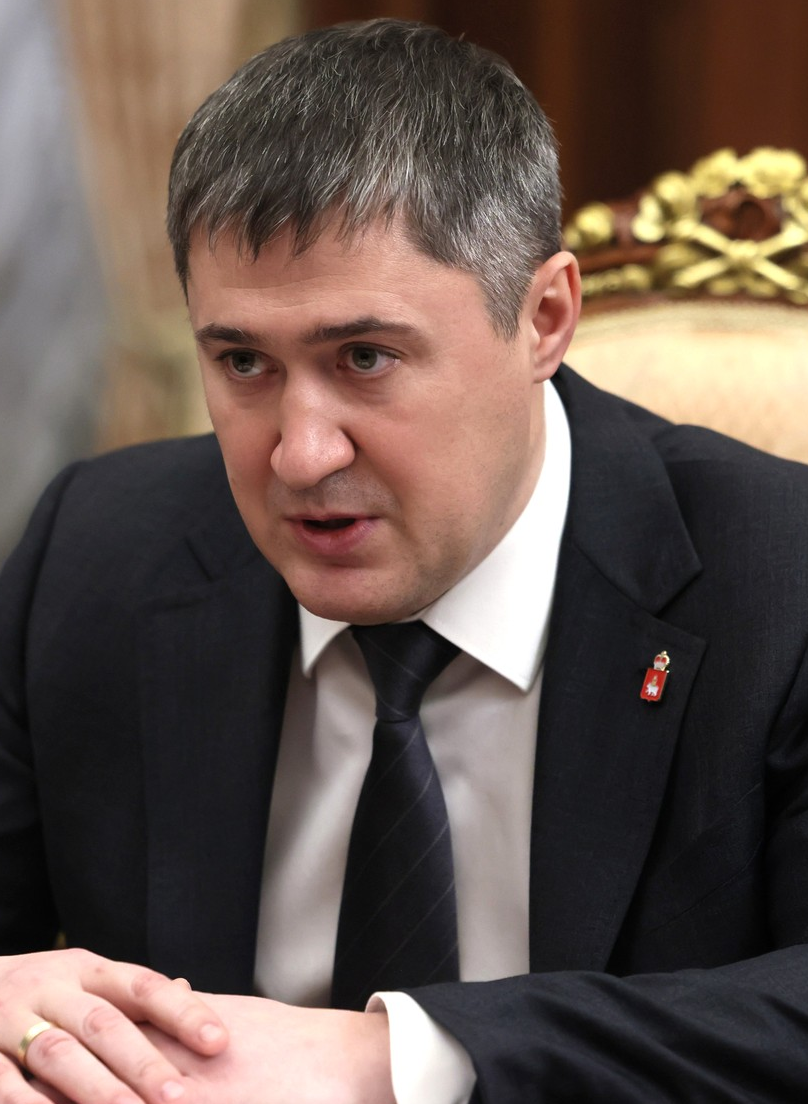

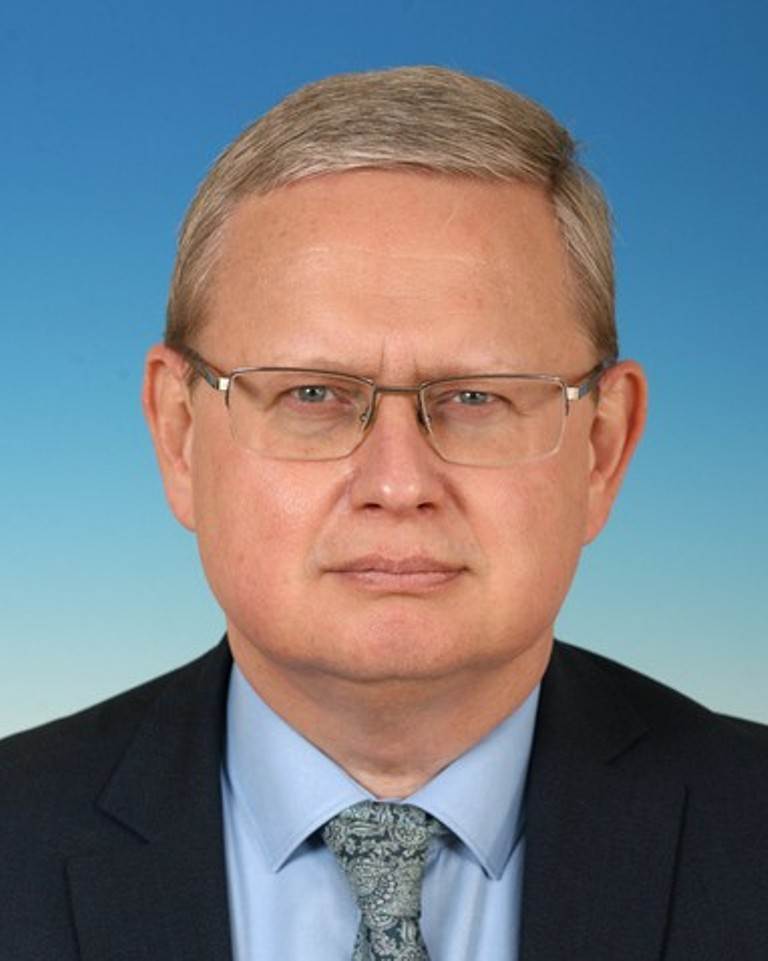
	Majority party	Minority party	Third party
		CPRF	LDPR
Candidate	Dmitry Makhonin	Ksenia Aytakova	Oleg Postnikov
Party	United Russia	CPRF	LDPR
Last election	33.05%, 40 seats	22.74%, 11 seats	9.64%, 3 seats
Seats won	47	5	4
Seat change	▲7	▼6	▲1
Popular vote	444,423	141,694	99,743
Percentage	48.67%	15.52%	10.92%
Swing	▲15.62 pp	▼7.22 pp	▲1.28 pp
	Fourth party	Fifth party	Sixth party
	NL		RPPSS
Candidate	Andrey Lyashkov	Mikhail Delyagin	Aleksey Gribanov
Party	New People	A Just Russia	Party of Pensioners
Last election	8.40%, 2 seats (Note: Denis Shitov and Pavel Isayev, both members of the faction, left the party and sought re-election as United Russia and LDPR candidates, respectively)	11.31%, 3 seats	4.74%, 0 seats
Seats won	3	1	0
Seat change	▲1	▼2	Steady
Popular vote	94,450	45,738	43,909
Percentage	10.34%	5.01%	4.81%
Swing	▲1.94 pp	▼6.30 pp	▲0.07 pp
Chairman before election
Valery Sukhikh
United Russia
Elected Chairman
Valery Sukhikh
United Russia
Senator before election
Aleksey Pushkov
Independent (Note: elected on the United Russia party list)
Senator after election
Aleksey Pushkov
Independent

The 2026 Legislative Assembly of Perm Krai election took place on 18–20 September 2026, on common election day, coinciding with the 2026 Russian legislative election. All 60 seats in the Legislative Assembly were up for re-election.

United Russia increased its majority in the Legislative Assembly, winning 48.7% of the vote and 29 single-mandate constituencies. Communist Party of the Russian Federation lost more than half of its previous faction, winning five seats. Liberal Democratic Party of Russia and New People gained one seat each. A Just Russia barely crossed a 5% threshold, retaining a single deputy in the Legislative Assembly.

== Electoral system ==
Under current election laws, the Legislative Assembly is elected for a term of five years, with parallel voting. 30 seats are elected by party-list proportional representation with a 5% electoral threshold, with the other half elected in 30 single-member constituencies by first-past-the-post voting. Seats in the proportional part are allocated using the Imperiali quota, modified to ensure that every party list, which passes the threshold, receives at least one mandate.

== Candidates ==
=== Party lists ===
To register regional lists of candidates, parties need to collect 0.5% of signatures of all registered voters in Perm Krai.

The following parties were relieved from the necessity to collect signatures:

- United Russia
- Communist Party of the Russian Federation
- Liberal Democratic Party of Russia
- A Just Russia
- New People
- Russian Party of Pensioners for Social Justice
- Communists of Russia

№	Party	Krai-wide list	Candidates	Territorial groups	Status
1	United Russia	Dmitry Makhonin • Sergey Yashkin • Irina Yermakova	102	30	Registered
2	Communist Party	Ksenia Aytakova • Adil Khamidullin • Vladimir Malchikov	131	30	Registered
3	Liberal Democratic Party	Oleg Postnikov • Aleksey Zolotarev • Georgy Tkachenko	130	30	Registered
4	Communists of Russia	Mikhail Dyachkov	87	30	Registered
5	New People	~~Yegor Laptev~~ • Andrey Lyashkov • Aleksey Ovchinnikov	50	15	Registered
6	Party of Pensioners	Aleksey Gribanov • Yegor Mukhin • Yelena Kirsanova	120	30	Registered
7	A Just Russia	Mikhail Delyagin • Veronika Kulikova	100	30	Registered

Yabloko and Rodina, which participated in the last election, did not file, while Green Alternative was dissolved and merged into Russian Ecological Party "The Greens".

=== Single-mandate constituencies ===
30 single-mandate constituencies were formed in Perm Krai. To register candidates in single-mandate constituencies need to collect 3% of signatures of registered voters in the constituency.

Number of candidates in single-mandate constituencies
Party	Candidates	
Party	Nominated	Registered
United Russia	30	29
Communist Party	30	30
A Just Russia	30	29
Liberal Democratic Party	30	30
New People	30	27
Party of Pensioners	30	30
Communists of Russia	29	29
Independent	2	1
Total	211	205

== Results ==
=== Results by party lists ===
Summary of the 18–20 September 2026 Legislative Assembly of Perm Krai election results
Party	Party list					Constituency		Total	
Party	Votes	%	±pp	Seats	+/–	Seats	+/–	Seats	+/–
United Russia	444,423	48.67	▲15.62	18	▲5	29	▲2	47	▲7
Communist Party	141,694	15.52	▼7.22	5	▼4	0	▼2	5	▼6
Liberal Democratic Party	99,743	10.92	▲1.28	3	Steady	1	▲1	4	▲1
New People	94,450	10.34	▲1.94	3	▲1	0	New	3	▲1
A Just Russia	45,738	5.01	▼6.30	1	▼2	0	Steady	1	▼2
Party of Pensioners	43,909	4.81	▲0.07	0	Steady	0	New	0	Steady
Communists of Russia	15,791	1.73	▼0.14	0	Steady	0	New	0	Steady
Independent	–	–	–	–	–	0	▼1	0	▼1
Invalid ballots	27,427	3.00	▼1.72	—	—	—	—	—	—
Total	913,175	100.00	—	30	Steady	30	Steady	60	Steady
Turnout	913,175	46.39	▲8.04	—	—	—	—	—	—
Registered voters	1,968,438	100.00	—	—	—	—	—	—	—

Valery Sukhikh (United Russia) was re-elected as Chairman of the Legislative Assembly, while incumbent Senator Aleksey Pushkov (Independent) was re-appointed to the Federation Council.

=== Results in single-member constituencies ===
==== District 1 ====
Summary of the 18–20 September 2026 Legislative Assembly of Perm Krai election in District 1
Candidate	Party	Votes	%
Aleksandr Motrich (incumbent)	United Russia	9,796	44.52%
Aleksey Mekhonoshin	Communist Party	4,375	19.88%
Armen Bezhanyan	A Just Russia	2,171	9.87%
Anton Balyshev	Liberal Democratic Party	1,976	8.98%
Yelena Trosheva	Communists of Russia	1,494	6.79%
Andrey Yevdokimov	Party of Pensioners	1,253	5.69%
Total		22,003	100%

==== District 2 ====
Summary of the 18–20 September 2026 Legislative Assembly of Perm Krai election in District 2
Candidate	Party	Votes	%
Irek Khaziyev (incumbent)	United Russia	11,626	40.67%
Aleksandr Paramonov	Communist Party	5,145	18.00%
Eduard Kovalev	A Just Russia	2,989	10.46%
Maksim Kolchanov	Liberal Democratic Party	2,642	9.24%
Vladimir Andreyev	Communists of Russia	2,453	8.58%
Tatyana Muzyreva	Party of Pensioners	2,346	8.21%
Total		28,583	100%

==== District 3 ====
Summary of the 18–20 September 2026 Legislative Assembly of Perm Krai election in District 3
Candidate	Party	Votes	%
Aleksey Dyomkin	United Russia	10,666	41.02%
Yury Aidarov	New People	3,769	14.50%
Galina Narygina	Communist Party	3,672	14.12%
Sergey Belyakov	A Just Russia	2,933	11.28%
Yelena Novoselova	Party of Pensioners	1,650	6.35%
Elnar Gabdulzyanov	Liberal Democratic Party	1,433	5.51%
Aleksandr Smirnov	Communists of Russia	870	3.35%
Total		25,999	100%

==== District 4 ====
Summary of the 18–20 September 2026 Legislative Assembly of Perm Krai election in District 4
Candidate	Party	Votes	%
Pavel Cherepanov (incumbent)	United Russia	14,891	47.92%
Anastasia Uglitskikh	New People	3,892	12.52%
Daniil Grigorovsky	Communist Party	3,669	11.81%
Ilya Gorbunov	Liberal Democratic Party	2,896	9.32%
Olga Shadrina	A Just Russia	2,096	6.74%
Sergey Astashov	Party of Pensioners	1,736	5.59%
Anna Shcherbakova	Communists of Russia	988	3.18%
Total		31,075	100%

==== District 5 ====
Summary of the 18–20 September 2026 Legislative Assembly of Perm Krai election in District 5
Candidate	Party	Votes	%
Sergey Medvedev	United Russia	10,734	35.91%
Sergey Stenno	Communist Party	6,173	20.65%
Marina Stepanova	Liberal Democratic Party	4,411	14.76%
Oleg Denisov	A Just Russia	3,480	11.64%
Oleg Ovsyannikov	Party of Pensioners	2,426	8.12%
David Avakyan	Communists of Russia	1,359	4.55%
Total		29,888	100%

==== District 6 ====
Summary of the 18–20 September 2026 Legislative Assembly of Perm Krai election in District 6
Candidate	Party	Votes	%
Radmir Gabdullin	United Russia	12,514	44.95%
Anna Skripchenko	New People	4,796	17.23%
Jadwiga Veklich	Communists of Russia	2,976	10.69%
Yulia Ragoza	Liberal Democratic Party	2,632	9.45%
Tatyana Yelkhova	A Just Russia	2,404	8.64%
Lyubov Furina	Party of Pensioners	1,545	5.55%
Total		27,840	100%

==== District 7 ====
Summary of the 18–20 September 2026 Legislative Assembly of Perm Krai election in District 7
Candidate	Party	Votes	%
Artyom Anferov	United Russia	8,738	30.06%
Aleksey Batalov	Communist Party	6,791	23.36%
Olga Mochalova	New People	3,728	12.82%
Ilya Kichigin	Liberal Democratic Party	3,157	10.86%
Anton Gordeyev	A Just Russia	2,251	7.74%
Anastasia Balakina	Party of Pensioners	1,679	5.78%
Dmitry Povarnitsyn	Communists of Russia	960	3.30%
Total		29,071	100%

==== District 8 ====
Summary of the 18–20 September 2026 Legislative Assembly of Perm Krai election in District 8
Candidate	Party	Votes	%
Sergey Boguslavsky (incumbent)	United Russia	10,405	35.39%
Ilya Vlasov	Communist Party	4,911	16.70%
Anton Silukov	New People	3,636	12.37%
Maria Vlasova	Liberal Democratic Party	2,626	8.93%
Antonina Gorshenkova	A Just Russia	2,168	7.37%
Aleksandr Vlasov	Communists of Russia	1,989	6.76%
Yekaterina Solovyeva	Party of Pensioners	1,967	6.69%
Total		29,403	100%

==== District 9 ====
Summary of the 18–20 September 2026 Legislative Assembly of Perm Krai election in District 9
Candidate	Party	Votes	%
Yelena Savelyeva	United Russia	11,494	36.50%
Vasily Belkin	Communist Party	6,076	19.30%
Andrey Pakin	New People	4,181	13.28%
Dmitry Afanasyev	Liberal Democratic Party	3,646	11.58%
Ivan Nikitin	A Just Russia	1,834	5.82%
Vladimir Bolotov	Party of Pensioners	1,476	4.69%
Matvey Alekseyev	Communists of Russia	1,403	4.46%
Total		31,489	100%

==== District 10 ====
Summary of the 18–20 September 2026 Legislative Assembly of Perm Krai election in District 10
Candidate	Party	Votes	%
Aleksey Rayev	United Russia	11,439	38.43%
Anna Baranova (incumbent)	Communist Party	5,713	19.19%
Sergey Rybakov	New People	3,715	12.48%
Tatyana Balashova	Liberal Democratic Party	3,293	11.06%
Svetlana Pozdeyeva	Party of Pensioners	1,685	5.66%
Arina Utochkina	A Just Russia	1,680	5.64%
Maria Chuprakova	Communists of Russia	1,041	3.50%
Total		29,767	100%

==== District 11 ====
Summary of the 18–20 September 2026 Legislative Assembly of Perm Krai election in District 11
Candidate	Party	Votes	%
Igor Arbuzov	Liberal Democratic Party	8,260	32.27%
Andrey Lyashkov	New People	4,106	16.04%
Veronika Kulikova	A Just Russia	3,898	15.23%
Ilya Sharipov	Communist Party	3,564	13.92%
Dmitry Ponomarenko	Party of Pensioners	2,374	9.28%
Kristina Kulikova	Communists of Russia	1,785	6.97%
Total		25,595	100%

==== District 12 ====
Summary of the 18–20 September 2026 Legislative Assembly of Perm Krai election in District 12
Candidate	Party	Votes	%
Andrey Yakishin	United Russia	18,821	55.60%
Vladimir Korolev	Liberal Democratic Party	3,994	11.80%
Tatyana Schmaltz	A Just Russia	2,890	8.54%
Ivan Butymov	Communist Party	2,690	7.95%
Marina Dzikanyuk	New People	2,077	6.14%
Nikita Mikhalev	Party of Pensioners	1,293	3.82%
Svetlana Anikeyenko	Communists of Russia	965	2.85%
Total		33,853	100%

==== District 13 ====
Summary of the 18–20 September 2026 Legislative Assembly of Perm Krai election in District 13
Candidate	Party	Votes	%
Pavel Kuzmin (incumbent)	United Russia	15,180	51.20%
Igor Nesterov	Communist Party	3,266	11.02%
Aleksandr Urosov	New People	2,390	8.06%
Yulia Varlamova	Liberal Democratic Party	2,321	7.83%
Denis Bogatyrev	Communists of Russia	1,749	5.90%
Yulia Snigireva	Party of Pensioners	1,676	5.65%
Dmitry Melchakov	A Just Russia	1,217	4.10%
Total		29,648	100%

==== District 14 ====
Summary of the 18–20 September 2026 Legislative Assembly of Perm Krai election in District 14
Candidate	Party	Votes	%
Venera Mukhatayeva	United Russia	11,973	44.33%
Igor Solovey	A Just Russia	3,684	13.64%
Vladimir Korelin	Liberal Democratic Party	2,865	10.61%
Boris Shelevoy	Communist Party	2,620	9.70%
Karina Gabsatarova	New People	2,472	9.15%
Mikhail Shumkov	Communists of Russia	1,092	4.04%
Roman Filimonov	Party of Pensioners	1,047	3.88%
Total		27,011	100%

==== District 15 ====
Summary of the 18–20 September 2026 Legislative Assembly of Perm Krai election in District 15
Candidate	Party	Votes	%
Andrey Silayev (incumbent)	United Russia	11,047	47.52%
Anatoly Britenkov	Liberal Democratic Party	2,497	10.74%
Tatyana Shlapakova	New People	2,189	9.42%
Sergey Gryzunov	Communist Party	2,019	8.68%
Tatyana Avdeyeva	Communists of Russia	1,918	8.25%
Yekaterina Gordash	A Just Russia	1,298	5.58%
Anastasia Shumkova	Party of Pensioners	1,249	5.37%
Total		23,247	100%

==== District 16 ====
Summary of the 18–20 September 2026 Legislative Assembly of Perm Krai election in District 16
Candidate	Party	Votes	%
Armen Garslyan (incumbent)	United Russia	16,386	57.85%
Zoya Kutyr	Communist Party	3,109	10.98%
Sergey Sysoyev	Liberal Democratic Party	2,191	7.74%
Roman Yakovlev	New People	1,958	6.91%
Ksenia Kuzina	Party of Pensioners	1,611	5.69%
Svetlana Sergeyeva	Communists of Russia	833	2.94%
Total		28,323	100%

==== District 17 ====
Summary of the 18–20 September 2026 Legislative Assembly of Perm Krai election in District 17
Candidate	Party	Votes	%
Pavel Noskov	United Russia	12,313	47.61%
Andrey Zakharov	Liberal Democratic Party	3,083	11.92%
Vitaly Blinov	New People	2,534	9.80%
Marat Galimullin	Communist Party	2,516	9.73%
Irina Shabarshina	A Just Russia	1,900	7.35%
Robert Kabirov	Party of Pensioners	1,228	4.75%
Anna Sushko	Communists of Russia	1,211	4.68%
Total		25,863	100%

==== District 18 ====
Summary of the 18–20 September 2026 Legislative Assembly of Perm Krai election in District 18
Candidate	Party	Votes	%
Ilya Shulkin (incumbent)	United Russia	9,688	40.77%
Andrey Kobelev	A Just Russia	3,595	15.13%
Sergey Novikov	New People	2,939	12.37%
Aleksandr Smirnov	Liberal Democratic Party	2,546	10.71%
Maksim Nikiforov	Communist Party	2,206	9.28%
Gleb Melnik	Communists of Russia	1,032	4.34%
Ivan Romanov	Party of Pensioners	858	3.61%
Total		23,763	100%

==== District 19 ====
Summary of the 18–20 September 2026 Legislative Assembly of Perm Krai election in District 19
Candidate	Party	Votes	%
Aleksandr Tretyakov (incumbent)	United Russia	20,435	58.73%
Vil Zakirov	Communist Party	5,569	16.01%
Aleksey Baranov	Liberal Democratic Party	2,599	7.47%
Inna Basharova	New People	2,214	6.36%
Alisher Nurmetov	A Just Russia	1,219	3.50%
Artur Lotokhov	Communists of Russia	892	2.56%
Ilmart Sakayev	Party of Pensioners	857	2.46%
Total		34,795	100%

==== District 20 ====
Summary of the 18–20 September 2026 Legislative Assembly of Perm Krai election in District 20
Candidate	Party	Votes	%
Olga Sudneva (incumbent)	United Russia	21,121	58.76%
Ruslan Zakirov	Communist Party	4,220	11.74%
Yelena Shabashova	A Just Russia	3,141	8.74%
Yulia Kozina	Liberal Democratic Party	2,661	7.40%
Andrey Vedernikov	Communists of Russia	2,140	5.95%
Aleksey Voronin	Party of Pensioners	1,475	4.10%
Total		35,944	100%

==== District 21 ====
Summary of the 18–20 September 2026 Legislative Assembly of Perm Krai election in District 21
Candidate	Party	Votes	%
Sergey Cherezov (incumbent)	United Russia	18,221	46.83%
Sergey Shirinkin	Communist Party	4,823	12.40%
Konstantin Busovikov	Liberal Democratic Party	3,654	9.39%
Vitaly Arkhipov	A Just Russia	3,296	8.47%
Mikhail Chavlytko	New People	2,879	7.40%
Olga Muzheva	Party of Pensioners	2,376	6.11%
Aleksandra Chichayeva	Communists of Russia	1,917	4.93%
Total		38,910	100%

==== District 22 ====
Summary of the 18–20 September 2026 Legislative Assembly of Perm Krai election in District 22
Candidate	Party	Votes	%
Vladimir Yurkov	United Russia	17,690	62.51%
Dmitry Novokreshchenov	Communist Party	2,725	9.63%
Aleksey Naborshchikov (incumbent)	A Just Russia	2,314	8.18%
Polina Oshmarina	New People	1,780	6.29%
Maksim Devyatov	Liberal Democratic Party	1,661	5.87%
Yekaterina Avdeyeva	Communists of Russia	779	2.75%
Dmitry Petukhov	Party of Pensioners	716	2.53%
Total		28,300	100%

==== District 23 ====
Summary of the 18–20 September 2026 Legislative Assembly of Perm Krai election in District 23
Candidate	Party	Votes	%
Valery Sukhikh (incumbent)	United Russia	24,514	67.86%
Rushan Sharipov	Communist Party	3,104	8.59%
Radik Khasanov	Liberal Democratic Party	2,267	6.28%
Rimas Shaikhutdinov	New People	1,525	4.22%
Dmitry Shcherbakov	A Just Russia	1,287	3.56%
Mikhail Chernov	Communists of Russia	1,211	3.35%
Denis Teploukhov	Party of Pensioners	912	2.52%
Daniil Shirinkin	Independent	551	1.53%
Total		36,124	100%

==== District 24 ====
Summary of the 18–20 September 2026 Legislative Assembly of Perm Krai election in District 24
Candidate	Party	Votes	%
Sergey Vetoshkin (incumbent)	United Russia	24,346	60.93%
Sergey Alikin	Communist Party	5,960	14.92%
Yury Utochkin	A Just Russia	2,243	5.61%
Aleksandr Bezmaternykh	New People	1,990	4.98%
Marina Kostenyuk	Liberal Democratic Party	1,788	4.47%
Svetlana Payusova	Communists of Russia	1,231	3.08%
Vladimir Korolev	Party of Pensioners	1,190	2.98%
Total		39,958	100%

==== District 25 ====
Summary of the 18–20 September 2026 Legislative Assembly of Perm Krai election in District 25
Candidate	Party	Votes	%
Denis Shitov	United Russia	14,103	40.44%
Andrey Burdin	A Just Russia	5,386	15.45%
Aleksey Vozhakov	New People	4,033	11.57%
Marina Bolotova	Liberal Democratic Party	3,611	10.36%
Viktor Slesarenko	Communist Party	2,635	7.56%
Leonid Bolotov	Party of Pensioners	2,254	6.46%
Ilya Votinov	Communists of Russia	1,404	4.03%
Total		34,872	100%

==== District 26 ====
Summary of the 18–20 September 2026 Legislative Assembly of Perm Krai election in District 26
Candidate	Party	Votes	%
Dmitry Kileyko (incumbent)	United Russia	16,812	50.87%
Georgy Balashov	Liberal Democratic Party	3,500	10.59%
Denis Bystrykh	Communist Party	3,366	10.19%
Kirill Yefimov	New People	2,855	8.64%
Vladimir Stepanov	A Just Russia	2,161	6.54%
Oksana Bardashova	Party of Pensioners	1,948	5.89%
Yegor Pigalev	Communists of Russia	1,025	3.10%
Total		33,046	100%

==== District 27 ====
Summary of the 18–20 September 2026 Legislative Assembly of Perm Krai election in District 27
Candidate	Party	Votes	%
Nadezhda Lyadova (incumbent)	United Russia	18,126	49.03%
Aleksey Goncharov	Communist Party	4,845	13.11%
Aleksey Zolotarev	Liberal Democratic Party	4,291	11.61%
Andrey Menyakin	New People	3,325	8.99%
Vyacheslav Luchnikov	A Just Russia	1,969	5.33%
Rufina Akhmatnurova	Party of Pensioners	1,943	5.26%
Shamil Kharasov	Communists of Russia	1,013	2.74%
Total		36,967	100%

==== District 28 ====
Summary of the 18–20 September 2026 Legislative Assembly of Perm Krai election in District 28
Candidate	Party	Votes	%
Dmitry Pylyov (incumbent)	United Russia	15,159	40.82%
Yury Chechyotkin	A Just Russia	6,856	18.46%
Yury Lyamin	Communist Party	5,321	14.33%
Ilya Lifanov	New People	3,795	10.22%
Yan Gorodetsky	Liberal Democratic Party	3,020	8.13%
Konstantin Kail	Party of Pensioners	1,609	4.33%
Total		37,139	100%

==== District 29 ====
Summary of the 18–20 September 2026 Legislative Assembly of Perm Krai election in District 29
Candidate	Party	Votes	%
Mikhail Petrov	United Russia	8,732	43.47%
Ruslan Memetov	Communist Party	3,827	19.05%
Irina Kudymova	A Just Russia	2,424	12.07%
Ruslan Saitov	Liberal Democratic Party	2,199	10.95%
Lyubov Ponomareva	Party of Pensioners	1,090	5.43%
Anton Noskov	Communists of Russia	851	4.24%
Total		20,087	100%

==== District 30 ====
Summary of the 18–20 September 2026 Legislative Assembly of Perm Krai election in District 30
Candidate	Party	Votes	%
Vladimir Khozyashev (incumbent)	United Russia	10,889	45.56%
Andrey Khoroshev	Communist Party	3,368	14.09%
Vladimir Bayandin	Liberal Democratic Party	3,271	13.69%
Anastasia Bayandina	A Just Russia	1,937	8.10%
Denis Davydov	New People	1,285	5.38%
Zhanna Kostyukevich	Communists of Russia	1,246	5.21%
Aleksandr Lunegov	Party of Pensioners	1,007	4.21%
Total		23,902	100%

=== Members ===
Incumbent deputies are highlighted with bold, elected members who declined to take a seat are marked with ~~strikethrough~~.

Constituency
No.	Member	Party
1	Aleksandr Motrich	United Russia
2	Irek Khaziyev	United Russia
3	Aleksey Dyomkin	United Russia
4	Pavel Cherepanov	United Russia
5	Sergey Medvedev	United Russia
6	Radmir Gabdullin	United Russia
7	Artyom Anferov	United Russia
8	Sergey Boguslavsky	United Russia
9	Yelena Savelyeva	United Russia
10	Aleksey Rayev	United Russia
11	Igor Arbuzov	Liberal Democratic Party
12	Andrey Yakishin	United Russia
13	Pavel Kuzmin	United Russia
14	Venera Mukhatayeva	United Russia
15	Andrey Silayev	United Russia
16	Armen Garslyan	United Russia
17	Pavel Noskov	United Russia
18	Ilya Shulkin	United Russia
19	Aleksandr Tretyakov	United Russia
20	Olga Sudneva	United Russia
21	Sergey Cherezov	United Russia
22	Vladimir Yurkov	United Russia
23	Valery Sukhikh	United Russia
24	Sergey Vetoshkin	United Russia
25	Denis Shitov	United Russia
26	Dmitry Kileyko	United Russia
27	Nadezhda Lyadova	United Russia
28	Dmitry Pylyov	United Russia
29	Mikhail Petrov	United Russia
30	Vladimir Khozyashev	United Russia

Party lists
Member	Party
~~Dmitry Makhonin~~	United Russia
Sergey Yashkin	United Russia
Irina Yermakova	United Russia
~~Dmitry Malyutin~~	United Russia
Aleksey Melnikov	United Russia
Eduard Avetisyan	United Russia
Grigory Malinin	United Russia
Aleksey Mazlov	United Russia
Konstantin Adamenko	United Russia
Stanislav Shvetsov	United Russia
Aleksandr Kozyukov	United Russia
~~Albert Demchenko~~	United Russia
Aleksey Pushkov	United Russia
Anatoly Makhovikov	United Russia
Maria Konovalova	United Russia
Konstantin Lyzov	United Russia
Vagarshak Sarksyan	United Russia
Mikhail Besfamilny	United Russia
~~Yelena Anisimova~~	United Russia
~~Vasily Kuznetsov~~	United Russia
~~Sergey Komonov~~	United Russia
~~Yulia Chauzova~~	United Russia
~~Svetlana Anisimova~~	United Russia
Aleksey Mazlov	United Russia
Aleksandr Grigorenko	United Russia
Yury Borisovets	United Russia
Anastasia Fesikova	United Russia
~~Ksenia Aytakova~~	Communist Party
Adil Khamidullin	Communist Party
Vladimir Malchikov	Communist Party
Ilya Vlasov	Communist Party
Vasily Belkin	Communist Party
Nikolay Bogatyrev	Communist Party
Oleg Postnikov	Liberal Democratic Party
Aleksey Zolotarev	Liberal Democratic Party
Georgy Tkachenko	Liberal Democratic Party
Andrey Lyashkov	New People
Aleksey Ovchinnikov	New People
Yury Aidarov	New People
~~Mikhail Delyagin~~	A Just Russia
Veronika Kulikova	A Just Russia

== See also ==
- 2026 Russian regional elections
