= Gilbert Ndlovu =

Zambian Mixed Martial Artist

- Born: 18 February 1999 (age 26)
- Nationality: Zambia
- Weight: 79 kg (174 lb; 12 st 6 lb)
- Style: Kyokushin

Amateur record
- Total: 6
- Wins: 4
- Losses: 2

Other information
- Occupation: Fighter

Gilbert Ndlovu is a Zambian mixed martial artist who made history in 2024 by becoming the first Zambian to win a gold medal at the International Mixed Martial Arts Federation (IMMAF) African Championships.

Ndlovu's amateur MMA record stands at 4 wins and 2 losses. In November 2024, he competed at the IMMAF World Championships, where he achieved a victory over Giorgi Tsipiani but faced a unanimous decision loss to Adilhan Ginayatov.
