= 1R =

1R may refer to:

- Complement component 1R
- Intelsat 1R, a communications satellite
- Yaesu VX-1R, a radio transceiver
- OneRepublic, a pop-rock/alternative band from Colorado, United States
- SSH 1R (WA), a former highway that is now Washington State Route 504
- 1R (chromosome)

== See also ==
- R1 (disambiguation)
