= Nigerian Mixed Martial Arts Federation =

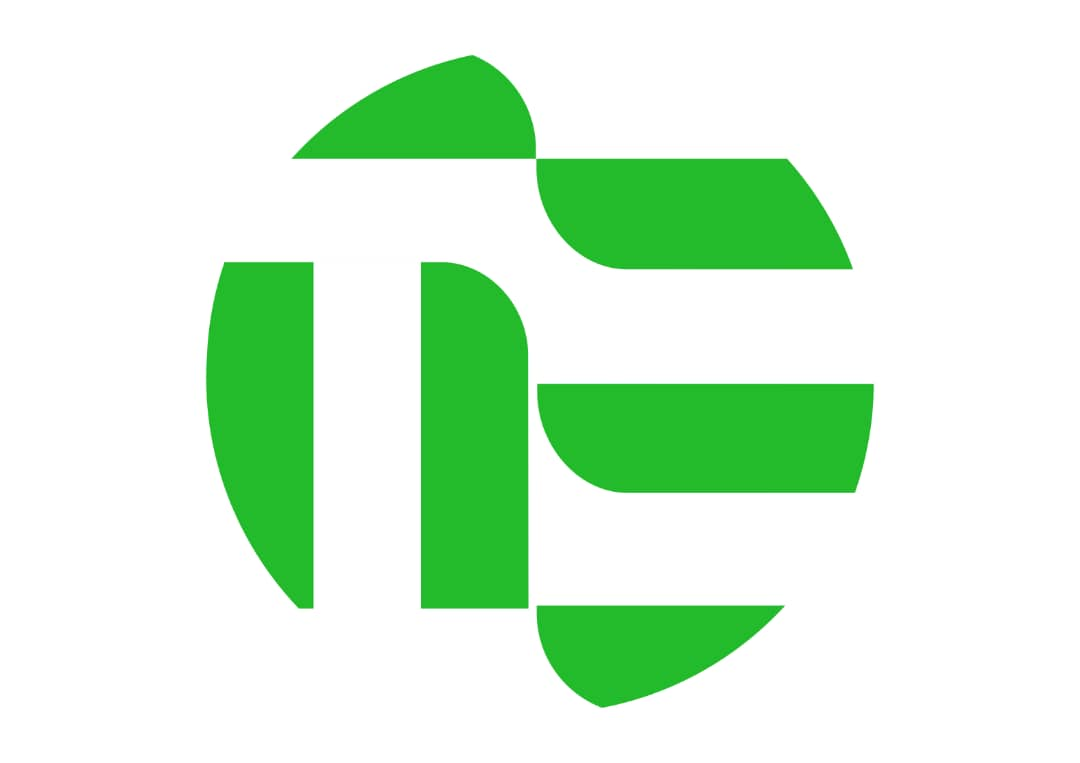
NMMAF logo

The Nigerian Mixed Martial Arts Federation (NMMAF) was founded on 11 March 2014 as the National governing body for amateur Mixed Martial Arts (MMA) in Nigeria. NMMAF is the body in charge of amateur mixed Martial arts championship and development of the sports in the federation. The NMMAF is also fully supported and recognized by the International Mixed Martial Arts Federation (IMMAF) and also affiliated to the International Mixed Martial Arts Federation (IMMAF). NMMAF is interested in bringing to limelight local talents and also the promotion of mixed martial arts in Nigeria. Selected to head the federation is a National and International karate champion AMB. Sensei Henry George. The Technical Director and Chairman of the technical community is Shihan (Pharm) Victor Akhimien (Vicamen) 7th Dan, a Nigerian Shito Ryu Karate President.
