= R1 =

R1, R.I., R01 or R-1 may refer to:

== Biology ==
- R1 plasmid, a plasmid found in E Coli
- ATC code R01 Nasal preparations, a subgroup of the Anatomical Therapeutic Chemical Classification System
- Haplogroup R1 (Y-DNA), a human Y-chromosome DNA haplogroup
- The R1 vein in insect wings

== Computing ==
- DeepSeek-R1, an open-source large language model released by DeepSeek in January 2025
- R1 (expert system), a 1978 expert system written by John McDermott
- .r01, a RAR file extension
- an alternate name for the Rice Institute Computer, an innovative computer extant at Rice University from 1959 to 1971

== Military equipment ==
- R-1 tank, a Romanian tank from World War II
- R-1 (missile), a post World War II Russian rocket
- AEG R.I, a 1918 German super-heavy bomber design
- DFW R.I, a 1916 German prototype bomber aircraft
- HMS Caprice, a destroyer originally designated with Pennant Number R01
- Linke-Hofmann R.I, a World War I German prototype bomber aircraft
- Polikarpov R-1, a Soviet Union copy of the 1931 British Airco DH.9A light bomber aircraft
- USS R-1 (SS-78), a 1918 United States Navy R-class coastal and harbor defense submarine
- a South African made version of the FN FAL battle rifle
- a version of the 1942 German Rheintochter ground-to-air missile
- Sentinel R1, a British airborne radar platform
- a Romanian designation of the Czechoslovak-designed tankette AH-IV

== Transportation ==
=== Automobiles ===
- Jaguar R1, a British 1999 Formula One racing car
- Javan R1, a British sports car
- Nuro R1, an American autonomous van
- Ora R1, a Chinese electric city car
- Praga R1, a Czech sports car
- Rivian, R1S and R1T, an American electric mid-size SUV and pickup truck
- SIN R1, a Bulgarian sports car
- Subaru R1, a Japanese city car

=== Aviation ===
- Beriev R-1, a 1952 Soviet turbojet-powered flying boat
- International Air Transport Association code for Sirin (airline)

=== Motorcycles ===
- Yamaha YZF-R1, a motorcycle

=== Rail ===
==== Lines ====
- R1 (Canberra), a light rail line between Gungahlin and Alinga Street, Australian Capital Territory
- R1 (SEPTA), a former commuter rail line in Philadelphia, Pennsylvania, which was split into:
  - Airport Line (SEPTA), or R1 Airport line
  - SEPTA Main Line (R1 Glenside), also called the Glenside Combined
- R1–RG1 (Rodalies de Catalunya), a commuter rail line in Catalonia, Spain
- R1 King George Blvd, RapidBus line in Surrey (Metro Vancouver, British Columbia, Canada)
- R1 (RER Vaud), an S-Bahn line in the canton of Vaud
- Line R1 (Xiamen Metro), China

==== Individual locomotive and multiple-unit classes ====
- LCDR R1 class, a class of 0-4-4T steam locomotives built by the South Eastern and Chatham Railway to modified LCDR design in 1900
- LNER Class R1, a class of British steam locomotives
- PRR R1, a 1934 American single prototype electric locomotive
- R1 (New York City Subway car), an American rapid transit multiple-unit
- SECR R1 class, a class of 0-6-0T steam locomotives rebuilt by the South Eastern and Chatham Railway from the SER R class between 1910 and 1922

=== Roads ===
- R1 expressway (Czech Republic), an expressway in the Czech Republic
- R1 expressway (Slovakia), a road connecting Trnava and Banská Bystrica
- R1 ring road (Belgium), a ring road around Antwerp
- R-1 motorway (Spain), a future radial motorway connecting Madrid and El Molar
- R1 road (Zimbabwe), a road connecting Beitbridge and Harare
- Radial Road 1 or R-1, an arterial road of Manila, Philippines

== Other ==
- R01 grant, a form of competitive funding issued by the National Institutes of Health in the United States
- R1 institution, a level of research activity on the Carnegie Classification of Institutions of Higher Education
- R1: Explosive when dry, a risk phrase
- R-1 Federation
- Rogue One, a 2016 film
- R1 Multi-frequency signaling, a telephony control technique
- R1 (nuclear reactor), the first nuclear reactor of Sweden
- R_{1} space in topology, in mathematics
- R-1 visa, a non-immigrant visa which allows travel to United States for service as a minister or other religious occupation.
- DSC-R1, a 2005 Sony Cyber-shot R series camera
- R1, a brand sold by Imperial Tobacco
- Region 1, the DVD region code for United States, Canada, Bermuda, U.S. territories
- Research I university, a designation of U.S. universities engaged in the highest levels of research activity
- BBC Radio 1, a national radio station in the United Kingdom
- Radio One (New Zealand) a New Zealand student radio station
- Samsung YP-R1, a digital audio player
- Rabbit r1, an AI-based personal assistant device
- Unitree R1, a humanoid robot developed by Unitree Robotics
- DeepSeek R1, a large language model created by DeepSeek

== See also ==
- 1R (disambiguation)
