= Albanian Mixed Martial Arts Federation =

Mixed martial arts federation in Albania

- Federata Shqiptare e Ndeshjes së Lirë
- Sport: MMA
- Jurisdiction: Albania
- Abbreviation: AMMAF
- Founded: 2012
- Affiliation: IMMAF
- Headquarters: Tirana
- President: Arjan Rizaj

Official website
- www.ammaf.org

The Albanian Mixed Martial Arts Federation (AMMAF or FSHNJ) (Albanian: Federata Shqiptare e Ndeshjes së Lirë) is the head governing body for the sport of professional MMA and promotion of this sport in Albania.

The AMMAF was founded in 2012 by Arjan Rizaj (currently President of the AMMAF) to improve and promote the MMA in the country, such as boxing; wrestling; kickboxing; Brazilian Jiu Jitsu and other martial arts. The Federation is also recognized by the Ministry of Education and Sport and is a member of the International Mixed Martial Arts Federation (IMMAF).

== History ==
The Albanian Mixed Martial Arts Federation was founded in 2012 and is a full-fledged member of the International Mixed Martial Arts Federation (IMMAF).

== See also ==
- Sports in Albania
