= 2009 in M-1 Global =

Mixed martial arts events

Information
- First date: January 11, 2009
- Last date: December 24, 2009

Events
- Total events: 27

Fights
- Total fights: 364

Chronology
2008 in M-1	2009 in M-1 Global	2010 in M-1

The year 2009 is the 13th year in the history of M-1 Global, a mixed martial arts promotion based in Russia. In 2009 M-1 Global held 27 events beginning with, M-1 Challenge 11: 2008 Challenge Finals.

== Events list ==
#	Event title	Date	Arena	Location
82	M-1 Ukraine: 2009 Selections 4	December 24, 2009	Acco International Exhibition Center	Kyiv, Ukraine
81	M-1 Challenge 20: 2009 Finals	December 3, 2009	Ice Palace Saint Petersburg	Saint Petersburg, Russia
80	M-1 Ukraine: 2009 Selections 3	November 29, 2009	Acco International Exhibition Center	Kyiv, Ukraine
79	M-1 Ukraine: 2009 Selections 2	November 12, 2009	Simferopol Circus	Simferopol, Ukraine
78	M-1 Challenge: 2009 Selections 9	November 3, 2009	World Cinema Studio	Saint Petersburg, Russia
77	M-1 Challenge: 2009 Selections 8	October 4, 2009	Moscow Martial Arts Center	Moscow, Russia
76	M-1 Challenge: 2009 Selections 7	October 3, 2009	Moscow Martial Arts Center	Moscow, Russia
75	M-1 Challenge 19: 2009 Semifinals	September 26, 2009		Rostov-on-Don, Russia
74	M-1 Ukraine: 2009 Selections 1	September 20, 2009	Acco International Exhibition Center	Kyiv, Ukraine
73	M-1 Challenge: 2009 Selections 6	September 5, 2009	President's Palace	Makhachkala, Russia
72	M-1 Global: Breakthrough	August 28, 2009	Memorial Hall	Kansas City, United States
71	M-1 Challenge 18: Netherlands Day Two	August 16, 2009	Studio 22	Hilversum, Netherlands
70	M-1 Challenge 18: Netherlands Day One	August 15, 2009	Studio 22	Hilversum, Netherlands
69	M-1 Challenge: 2009 Selections 5	July 22, 2009	The Flying Dutchman	Saint Petersburg, Russia
68	M-1: Donbas Open Mix Fight	July 4, 2009	Sportmax Sports Complex	Donetsk, Ukraine
67	M-1 Challenge 17: Korea	July 4, 2009	Olympic Hall	Seoul, South Korea
66	M-1 Challenge: 2009 Selections 4	June 24, 2009		Saint Petersburg, Russia
65	M-1 Ukraine: Lviv Open Cup	June 14, 2009		Lviv, Ukraine
64	M-1 Challenge 16: USA	June 5, 2009	Memorial Hall	Kansas City, United States
63	M-1 Challenge: 2009 Selections 3	May 28, 2009		Saint Petersburg, Russia
62	M-1 Challenge 15: Brazil	May 9, 2009	Esporte Clube Sirio	São Paulo, Brazil
61	M-1 Challenge 14: Japan	April 29, 2009	Differ Ariake Arena	Tokyo, Japan
60	M-1 Challenge: 2009 Selections 2	April 19, 2009	Yubileyny Sports Palace	Saint Petersburg, Russia
59	M-1 Challenge 13: Bulgaria	March 28, 2009	Sports Hall Mladost	Burgas, Bulgaria
58	M-1 Challenge: 2009 Selections 1	March 13, 2009	Yubileyny Sports Palace	Saint Petersburg, Russia
57	M-1 Challenge 12: USA	February 21, 2009	Emerald Queen Casino	Tacoma, United States
56	M-1 Challenge 11: 2009 Challenge Finals	January 11, 2009	Special Sports Centrum	Amstelveen, Netherlands

== M-1 Challenge 11: 2008 Challenge Finals ==
M-1 Challenge 11: 2008 Challenge Finals was an event held on January 11, 2009 in The Special Sports Centrum at Amstelveen, North Holland, Netherlands.

=== Results ===
Main Card
Weight class				Method	Round	Time	Notes
	Alexey Oleinik	def.	Jessie Gibbs	Submission (Ezekiel Choke)	2	3:42
	Mikhail Zayats	def.	David Haagsma	Submission (Armbar)	1	3:25
	Jason Jones	def.	Dmitry Samoilov	Decision (Unanimous)	3	5:00
	Erik Oganov	def.	Romano de los Reyes	Decision (Unanimous)	3	5:00
	Mikhail Malyutin	def.	Bogdan Cristea	Decision (Split)	3	5:00
	Sang Soo Lee	def.	Ricardo Wondel	TKO (Hand Injury)	1	2:41
	Enoc Solves Torres	def.	Seung-Bae Whi	Decision (Unanimous)	3	5:00
	Toni Valtonen	def.	Chang Seob Lee	Submission (Slam)	3	1:03
	Radmir Gabdullin	def.	Hoon Kim	Submission (Triangle Choke)	2	0:35

== M-1 Challenge 12: USA ==
M-1 Challenge 12: USA was an event held on February 21, 2009 at The Emerald Queen Casino in Tacoma, Washington.

=== Results ===
Main Card
Weight class				Method	Round	Time	Notes
	Edson Franca	def.	Carl Seumanutafa	Decision (Split)	2	5:00
	Raphael Davis	def.	Jair Goncalves	TKO (Punches)	1	4:05
	Reggie Orr	def.	Juliano Belgine	Decision (Split)	2	5:00
	Eduardo Pamplona	def.	Dylan Clay	TKO (Punches)	3	2:48
	Dave Jansen	def.	Flavio Alvaro	Decision (Unanimous)	2	5:00
	Alexey Oleinik	def.	Sang Soo Lee	Submission (Ezekiel Choke)	2	4:27
	Jae-Young Kim	def.	Mikhail Zayats	TKO (Head Kick)	2	4:02
	Dmitry Samoilov	def.	Hyun Gyu Lim	Decision (Unanimous)	2	5:00
	Myung Ho Bae	def.	Erik Oganov	Submission (Rear-Naked Choke)	2	2:12
	Do Hyung Kim	def.	Mikhail Malyutin	Decision (Unanimous)	2	5:00
	Toni Valtonen	def.	Sander Duyvis	TKO (Punches)	1	0:18
	Marcus Vanttinen	def.	Jason Jones	Decision (Unanimous)	2	5:00
	Lucio Linhares	def.	Kamil Uygun	Submission (Armbar)	1	1:22
	Janne Tulirinta	def.	Tommy Depret	Submission (Brabo Choke)	1	2:30
	Danny van Bergen	def.	Juha-Pekka Vainikainen	Decision (Unanimous)	2	5:00

== M-1 Challenge: 2009 Selections 1 ==
M-1 Challenge: 2009 Selections 1 was an event held on March 13, 2009 at Yubileyny Sports Palace in Saint Petersburg, Leningrad Oblast, Russia.

=== Results ===
Main Card
Weight class				Method	Round	Time	Notes
	Arsen Abdulkerimov	def.	Djayhun Abilov	Submission (Triangle Choke)	1	0:00
	Ibragim Halilov	def.	Alexander Grebenkin	TKO (Punches)	2	2:36
	Artur Guseinov	def.	Magomed Sultanakhmedov	Decision (Unanimous)	2	5:00
	Rashid Magomedov	def.	Bagavdin Gadzhimuradov	TKO (Punches)	2	1:37
	Magomed Magomedov	def.	Vugar Bakhshiev	Submission (Guillotine Choke)	2	2:45
	Levan Persaev	def.	Evgeni Myakinkin	Decision (Unanimous)	2	5:00
	Maxim Grishin	def.	Magomed Umarov	TKO (Punches)	1	0:00
	Viktor Nemkov	def.	Ishkhan Zakharian	TKO (Corner Stoppage)	2	0:00
	Radmir Gabdullin	def.	Artur Avakyan	Submission (Achilles Lock)	1	0:00
	Anzor Kardanov	def.	Marat Ilaev	Submission (Triangle Choke)	1	2:47
	Amirkhan Mazihov	def.	Rustam Tashuev	Submission (Anaconda Choke)	2	3:06
	Alexei Nazarov	def.	Artur Korchemny	TKO (Punches)	2	3:07

== M-1 Challenge 13: Bulgaria ==
M-1 Challenge 13: Bulgaria was an event held on March 28, 2009 at The Sports Hall Mladost in Bourgas, Bulgaria.

=== Results ===
Main Card
Weight class				Method	Round	Time	Notes
	Lloyd Marshbanks	def.	Emil Zahariev	Submission (Heel Hook)	1	3:27
	Chuck Grigsby	def.	Atanas Djambazov	Decision (Unanimous)	3	5:00
	Herbert Goodman	def.	Jordan Radev	TKO (Punches)	2	4:59
	Steve Carl	def.	Ivan Ivanov	Submission (Rear-Naked Choke)	1	3:31
	Renato Migliaccio	def.	Yanko Yanev	Submission (Armbar)	1	4:45
	Michal Kita	def.	Akhmed Sultanov	TKO (Punches)	1	2:30
	Gadzhimurad Omarov	def.	Nills van Noord	Submission (Rear-Naked Choke)	1	2:24
	Sergey Kornev	def.	Nathan Schouteren	KO (Slam)	1	0:12
	Magomed Shikshabekov	def.	Jason Ponet	Submission (Triangle Choke)	1	1:34
	Yuri Ivlev	def.	Romano de los Reyes	Decision (Unanimous)	3	5:00
	Dawid Baziak	def.	Tugrul Okay	TKO (Punches)	2	0:52
	Martin Zawada	def.	Sam Turky	TKO (Punches)	1	2:38
	Gregor Herb	def.	Ahmed Bayrak	Submission (Rear-Naked Choke)	2	2:00
	Daniel Weichel	def.	Fatih Dogan	Submission (Brabo Choke)	1	2:29
	Franco de Leonardis	def.	Akin Duran	Submission (Triangle Choke)	1	2:29

== M-1 Challenge: 2009 Selections 2 ==
M-1 Challenge: 2009 Selections 2 was an event held on April 19, 2009 at The Yubileyny Sports Palace in Saint Petersburg, Leningrad Oblast, Russia.

=== Results ===
Main Card
Weight class				Method	Round	Time	Notes
	Baga Agaev	def.	Bogdan Hmelnitskiy	Submission (Armbar)	1	2:33
	Gadzhimurad Omarov	def.	Dmitry Pashinin	TKO (Punches)	1	0:43
	Ruslan Khaskhanov	def.	Denis Semenov	Submission (Triangle Choke)	1	1:37
	Rustam Khabilov	def.	Vladimir Papusha	Submission (Armbar)	1	2:04
	Zagalav Mahachev	def.	Akop Stepanyan	Submission (Armbar)	1	4:55
	Aleksei Butorin	def.	Sergey Khramov	TKO (Punches)	2	2:15
	Vyacheslav Vasilevsky	def.	Abdula Mutalimov	TKO (Punches)	1	1:29
	Artur Guseinov	def.	Alexey Gagarin	TKO (Punches)	1	4:15
	Vener Galiev	def.	Bagavdin Gadzhimuradov	Decision (Unanimous)	3	5:00
	Karen Grigoryan	def.	Maxim Rozhkov	Submission (Rear-Naked Choke)	1	1:10
	Telman Sherifov	def.	Rizvan Daniyalov	KO (Knee)	1	4:47
	Rasul Magomedov	def.	Aleksander Gordilov	Submission (Armbar)	2	1:05
	Anatoly Lavrov	def.	Agop Topchyan	TKO (Punches)	2	4:35
	Bislan Atleshev	def.	Rustam Thagabsoev	Submission (Rear-Naked Choke)	1	3:55
	Jamaldin Kubachev	def.	Armen Ananyan	Decision (Unanimous)	2	5:00
	Alexander Volkov	def.	Nikolay Pleshakov	TKO (Punches)	1	1:20
	Alexei Nazarov	def.	Dmitry Surnev	TKO (Punches)	1	3:37

== M-1 Challenge 14: Japan ==
M-1 Challenge 14: Japan was an event held on April 29, 2009 at The Differ Ariake Arena in Tokyo, Japan.

=== Results ===
Main Card
Weight class				Method	Round	Time	Notes
	Rob Broughton	def.	Yusuke Kawaguchi	Decision (Unanimous)	2	5:00
	Tom Blackledge	def.	Tatsuya Mizuno	Submission (Rear-Naked Choke)	1	3:22
	Matt Thorpe	def.	Yusuke Masuda	Submission (Rear-Naked Choke)	2	1:30
	Simon Phillips	def.	Hidehiko Hasegawa	KO (Punch)	1	0:20
	Luiz Andrade I	def.	Ian Butlin	Submission (Armbar)	1	2:30
	Karl Amoussou	def.	Kazuhiro Hamanaka	KO (Flying Knee)	1	0:23
	Shane del Rosario	def.	Dool Hee Lee	KO (Punch to the Body)	1	2:27
	Raphael Davis	def.	Jae-Young Kim	Submission (Punches)	2	3:45
	Giva Santana	def.	Min Suk Heo	Submission (Armbar)	1	4:05
	Fabio Nascimento	def.	Myung Ho Bae	Decision (Majority)	2	5:00
	Dave Jansen	def.	Yui Chul Nam	Decision (Unanimous)	2	5:00
	Kosuke Umeda	def.	Muneyuki Sato	Decision (Unanimous)	2	5:00
	Rogent Lloret	def.	Soufian Elgarne	Submission (Arm-Triangle Choke)	1	2:44
	Christian M'Pumbu	def.	Enoc Solves Torres	Submission (Armbar)	1	4:59
	Christophe Daffreville	def.	Rayco Romero Silva	Submission (North-South Choke)	1	2:48
	Abner Lloveras	def.	Gael Grimaud	Decision (Split)	3	5:00
	Jose Luis Zapater	def.	Makhtar Gueye	DQ	3	1:21
	Tomoaki Ueyama	def.	Takayuki Hosakawa	TKO (Punches)	1	2:56

== M-1 Challenge 15: Brazil ==
M-1 Challenge 15: Brazil was an event held on May 9, 2009 at The Esporte Clube Sirio in São Paulo, Brazil.

=== Results ===
Main Card
Weight class				Method	Round	Time	Notes
	Joaquim Ferreira	def.	Maxim Grishin	Submission (North-South Choke)	1	3:57
	Alexandre Machado	def.	Mikhail Zayats	Decision (Unanimous)	3	5:00
	Leandro Silva	def.	Dmitry Samoilov	Decision (Unanimous)	3	5:00
	Eduardo Pamplona	def.	Erik Oganov	Decision (Majority)	2	5:00
	Hacran Dias	def.	Amirkhan Mazihov	Submission (Rear-Naked Choke)	1	3:58
	Akhmed Sultanov	def.	Lars Klug	Submission (Armbar)	1	1:21
	Gadzhimurad Omarov	def.	Ismail Cetinkaya	Submission (Punches)	1	1:09
	Gregor Herb	def.	Sergey Kornev	Submission (Armbar)	1	4:32
	Magomed Shikshabekov	def.	Sven Heising	KO (Punches)	1	4:27
	Yuri Ivlev	def.	Franco de Leonardis	TKO (Punches)	2	2:14
	Jessie Gibbs	def.	Nikola Dipchikov	Submission (Punches)	1	1:37
	Emil Zahariev	def.	Jason Jones	TKO (Doctor Stoppage)	1	2:09
	Jordan Radev	def.	Danny Smit	Decision (Unanimous)	2	5:00
	Raymond Jarman	def.	Ivan Ivanov	KO (Flying Knee)	1	0:35
	Yanko Yanev	def.	Danny van Bergen	Submission (Armbar)	1	2:23

== M-1 Challenge: 2009 Selections 3 ==
M-1 Challenge: 2009 Selections 3 was an event held on May 28, 2009 in Saint Petersburg, Leningrad Oblast, Russia.

=== Results ===
Main Card
Weight class				Method	Round	Time	Notes
	Stanislav Shushko	def.	Shamil Vajsurov	TKO (Punch)	1	3:29
	Alexei Belyaev	def.	Makasharip Makasharipov	Submission (Guillotine Choke)	1	1:37
	Artur Guseinov	def.	Stanislav Molodcov	TKO (Kick to the Body)	1	2:44
	Sergei Bal	def.	Ismail Aliev	TKO (Kick to the Body)	1	2:44
	Maratbek Kalabekov	def.	Karen Grigoryan	Submission (Guillotine Choke)	2	2:00
	Magomed Ibragimov	def.	Konstantyn Stryzhak	TKO (Punches)	1	3:43
	Shamil Tinagadjiev	def.	Shamil Nurmagomedov	Decision (Unanimous)	2	5:00
	Alikhan Magomedov	def.	Vadim Khazov	TKO (Punches)	1	0:59
	Alexander Butenko	def.	Anzor Kardanov	Submission (Armbar)	3	1:47
	Anton Bestaev	def.	Ratmir Teuvazhukov	Decision (Unanimous)	3	5:00
	Kirill Sidelnikov	def.	Rizvan Daniyalov	Submission (Keylock)	1	1:30
	Viktor Nemkov	def.	Ilya Malyukov	Decision (Unanimous)	2	5:00
	Alexei Nazarov	def.	Anatoly Lavrov	Submission (Armbar)	2	0:39
	Marat Ilaev	def.	Havazh Beldurov	Submission (Guillotine Choke)	1	3:39
	Amirkhan Mazihov	def.	Pavel Balmasov	Submission (Rear-Naked Choke)	1	0:58
	Alexander Volkov	def.	Adam Alikhanov	TKO (Punches)	1	0:20
	Roman Mazur	def.	Levan Persaev	Submission (Armbar)	1	2:48

== M-1 Challenge 16: USA ==
M-1 Challenge 16: USA was an event held on June 5, 2009 at Memorial Hall in Kansas City, Missouri, United States.

=== Results ===
Main Card
Weight class				Method	Round	Time	Notes
	Lloyd Marshbanks	def.	Toni Valtonen	Submission (Scarf Hold)	2	0:55
	Rodney Wallace	def.	Marcus Vanttinen	Decision (Unanimous)	2	5:00
	Lucio Linhares	def.	Valdir Araujo	KO (Punch)	1	1:25
	Janne Tulirinta	def.	Anthony Ford	TKO (Punches)	1	0:11
	Renato Migliaccio	def.	Niko Puhakka	Submission (Armbar)	1	4:18
	Rob Broughton	def.	Soufian Elgarne	TKO (Ankle Injury)	1	2:02
	Johan Romming	def.	Danny Giblin	Submission (North-South Choke)	1	1:59
	Christophe Daffreville	def.	Matt Thorpe	Submission (Arm-Triangle Choke)	1	4:32
	Gael Grimaud	def.	Simon Phillips	Submission (Triangle Choke)	1	1:29
	Makhtar Gueye	def.	Ian Butlin	TKO (Punches)	1	0:09
	Michal Kita	def.	Liron Wilson	TKO (Punches)	1	3:55
	Ryan Sturdy	def.	John Doyle	Decision (Majority)	2	5:00
	Nathan Schouteren	def.	Ahmed Bayrak	TKO (Punches)	1	3:21
	Diego Gonzalez	def.	Fatih Dogan	TKO (Punches)	1	2:16
	Akin Duran	def.	Romano de los Reyes	TKO (Punches)	3	1:57

== M-1 Ukraine: Lviv Open Cup ==
M-1 Ukraine: Lviv Open Cup was an event held on June 14, 2009 in Lviv, Lviv Oblast, Ukraine.

=== Results ===
Main Card
Weight class				Method	Round	Time	Notes
	Igor Kukurudziak	def.	Igor Bogdanov	TKO (Punches)	1	0:00
	Alexey Tsukanov	def.	Artem Oleinik	TKO (Punches)	1	0:00
	Dmitri Emets	def.	Elshan Tagiev	Submission (Guillotine Choke)	1	0:00
	Igor Grytskiv	def.	Konstantin Pankov	TKO (Punches)	1	0:00
	Rostislav Kitun	def.	Alexey Bibikov	Submission (Guillotine Choke)	1	0:00
	Anton Chuvasov	def.	Vadim Durnev	DQ	1	0:00
	Aleksey Gonchar	def.	Evgeni Boldyrev	TKO (Punches)	1	0:00
	Artem Akopyan	def.	Dmitri Goncharenko	Submission (Armbar)	1	0:00
	Evgeni Fomenko	def.	Rostislav Khvorost	Submission (Achilles Lock)	1	0:00
	Kirill Krikunov	def.	Serhiy Adamchuk	Decision (Unanimous)	2	5:00
	Sergey Grytskiv	def.	Viktor Kiyko	Submission (Guillotine Choke)	1	0:00
	Artur Markov	def.	Konstantin Petruchenya	TKO (Punches)	1	0:00
	Alexander Kozyr	def.	Ivan Stadnik	Submission (Achilles Lock)	1	0:00

== M-1 Challenge: 2009 Selections 4 ==
M-1 Challenge: 2009 Selections 4 was an event held on June 24, 2009 in Saint Petersburg, Leningrad Oblast, Russia.

=== Results ===
Main Card
Weight class				Method	Round	Time	Notes
	Akhmed Sultanov	def.	Alexander Volkov	Submission (Armbar)	1	2:50
	Igor Savelyev	vs.	Besiki Gerenava	Draw	3	5:00
	Ruslan Khaskhanov	def.	Sergey Yakovlev	Submission (Heel Hook)	1	0:44
	Rustam Khabilov	def.	Vener Galiev	Decision (Split)	2	5:00
	Zagalav Mahachev	def.	Radhza Nuhradin	Submission (Armbar)	2	1:45
	Magomed Ibragimov	def.	Telman Sherifov	Decision (Unanimous)	2	5:00
	Rasul Magomedov	def.	Asildar Abdulaev	TKO (Punches)	1	1:40
	Anzor Kardanov	def.	Bislan Atleshev	Submission (Triangle Choke)	1	2:23
	Ratmir Teuvazhukov	def.	Armen Ananyan	Decision (Unanimous)	2	5:00
	Visampasha Mirzakhanov	def.	Rustam Yamashev	Submission (Punches)	2	3:48
	Alexander Tokarev	def.	Ivan Nadein	Decision (Unanimous)	2	5:00
	Alisher Hasanov	def.	Tovmas Martirosyan	Decision (Unanimous)	2	5:00
	Ragim Zagirov	def.	Bahtiyar Sapakulov	Submission (Armbar)	1	0:40

== M-1 Challenge 17: Korea ==
M-1 Challenge 17: Korea was an event held on July 4, 2009 at Olympic Hall in Seoul, South Korea.

=== Results ===
Main Card
Weight class				Method	Round	Time	Notes
	Hae Jun Yang	def.	Joaquim Ferreira	KO (Punches)	1	0:14
	Alexandre Machado	def.	Dool Hee Lee	Submission (Rear-Naked Choke)	2	3:26
	Daniel Acacio	def.	Jae-Young Kim	Decision (Majority)	2	5:00
	Eduardo Pamplona	def.	Do Hyung Kim	Decision (Unanimous)	2	5:00
	Yui Chul Nam	def.	Hacran Dias	Decision (Unanimous)	3	5:00
	Shane del Rosario	def.	Maxim Grishin	TKO (Punches)	1	0:21
	Tony Lopez	def.	Viktor Nemkov	Submission (Rear-Naked Choke)	2	3:06
	Giva Santana	def.	Radmir Gabdullin	Submission (Triangle Choke)	1	3:47
	Fabio Nascimento	def.	Marat Ilaev	Submission (Armbar)	2	2:13
	Dave Jansen	def.	Amirkhan Mazihov	Submission (Guillotine Choke)	1	0:22
	Toni Valtonen	def.	Nikola Dipchikov	Submission (Triangle Choke)	1	4:49
	Marcus Vanttinen	def.	Emil Zahariev	Submission (Punches)	3	3:42
	Rosen Dimitrov	def.	Mikko Suvanto	Decision (Majority)	2	5:00
	Janne Tulirinta	def.	Ivan Ivanov	TKO (Punches)	1	3:44
	Niko Puhakka	def.	Yanko Yanev	TKO (Punches)	1	2:16

== M-1: Donbas Open Mix Fight ==
M-1: Donbas Open Mix Fight was an event held on July 4, 2009 at The Sportmax Sports Complex in Donetsk, Donetsk Oblast, Ukraine.

=== Results ===
Main Card
Weight class				Method	Round	Time	Notes
	Alexander Romaschenko	def.	Mikhail Rutskiv	TKO (Corner Stoppage)	1	0:00
	Valeri Boyarkin	def.	Evgeni Kurakin	TKO (Corner Stoppage)	3	0:00
	Vladimir Opanasenko	def.	Daniel Samko	TKO (Corner Stoppage)	1	0:00
	Vadim Khaitulov	def.	Oleg Golovin	Decision (Unanimous)	2	5:00
	Andrei Levkin	def.	Roman Lagunkov	Submission (Rear-Naked Choke)	1	0:00
	Guram Gugenishvili	def.	Roman Bagin	Submission (Rear-Naked Choke)	1	0:00
	David Tkeshelashvili	def.	Andrei Embolaev	Submission (Rear-Naked Choke)	1	0:00
	Pavel Kusch	def.	Sergei Dzygansky	Submission (Rear-Naked Choke)	1	0:00
	Alexander Vykhristyuk	def.	Mamedov Dilyaver	Submission (Heel Hook)	1	0:00
	Nikolai Keda	def.	Rustam Rakhmanov	TKO (Retirement)	2	5:00
	Alexander Kozyr	def.	Evgeni Yavorski	Submission (Kneebar)	1	0:00
	Alexei Varagushin	def.	Andrei Verpahovsky	TKO (Doctor Stoppage)	1	0:00

== M-1 Challenge: 2009 Selections 5 ==
M-1 Challenge: 2009 Selections 5 was an event held on July 22, 2009 at The Flying Dutchman in Saint Petersburg, Leningrad Oblast, Russia.

=== Results ===
Main Card
Weight class				Method	Round	Time	Notes
	Aleksei Butorin	def.	Ibragim Halilov	TKO (Punches)	2	1:28
	Khanilav Khanilaev	def.	Murad Magomedov	Decision (Split)	2	5:00
	Magomed Sultanakhmedov	def.	Sergei Bal	TKO (Punches)	2	2:42
	Rashid Magomedov	def.	Magomedrasul Khasbulaev	Decision (Unanimous)	3	5:00
	Magomed Magomedov	def.	Akop Stepanyan	Submission (Rear-Naked Choke)	1	3:30
	Alexei Nazarov	def.	Magomedsalam Kaynurov	Submission (Guillotine Choke)	2	2:48
	Konstantyn Stryzhak	def.	Dmitri Starikov	Submission (Rear-Naked Choke)	1	1:31
	Ilya Malyukov	def.	Dibir Zagirov	TKO (Punches)	1	4:45
	Shamil Nurmagomedov	def.	Anatoly Lavrov	Submission (Armbar)	1	4:30
	Alexander Butenko	def.	Andrei Zubov	Submission (Armbar)	1	1:41
	Pavel Kokarev	def.	Anton Bestaev	Decision (Unanimous)	2	5:00
	Djamal Kurbanov	def.	Alisher Satibaldyev	TKO (Punches)	1	1:47
	Radja Nukhraddin	def.	Azamat Kuliev	Submission (Guillotine Choke)	1	3:07

== M-1 Challenge 18: Netherlands Day One ==
M-1 Challenge 18: Netherlands Day One was an event held on August 15, 2009 at Studio 22 in Hilversum, Netherlands.

=== Results ===
Main Card
Weight class				Method	Round	Time	Notes
	Thorsten Kronz	def.	Miodrag Petkovic	TKO (Doctor Stoppage)	2	3:08
	Mathias Schuck	def.	Johan Romming	Decision (Unanimous)	2	5:00
	Nathan Schouteren	def.	Ismail Cetinkaya	TKO (Punches)	1	3:51
	Diego Gonzalez	def.	Nordin Asrih	Decision (Unanimous)	3	5:00
	Daniel Weichel	def.	Danial Sharifi	Submission (Guillotine Choke)	1	2:53
	Yoshiyuki Nakanishi	def.	Akim Assenine	Submission (Achilles Lock)	1	4:51
	Christian M'Pumbu	def.	Hideto Tatsumi	TKO (Punches)	2	4:53
	Christophe Daffreville	def.	Yusuke Masuda	Submission (Armbar)	1	2:27
	Yuya Shirai	def.	Gael Grimaud	TKO (Punches)	1	4:16
	Yoshihiro Tomioka	def.	Frederic Fernandez	Submission (Arm-Triangle Choke)	1	3:53
	Dave Keeley	def.	Paco Estevez	TKO (Punches)	2	4:23
	Tom Blackledge	def.	Enoc Solves Torres	KO (Head Kick)	1	0:09
	Matt Thorpe	def.	Rafael Rodriguez	Submission (Triangle Choke)	1	0:56
	Simon Phillips	def.	Jonathan Leon	Submission (Rear Naked Choke)	1	4:29
	Scott Hewitt	def.	Jose Roque	Submission (Armbar)	2	1:35

== M-1 Challenge 18: Netherlands Day Two ==
M-1 Challenge 18: Netherlands Day Two was an event held on August 16, 2009 at Studio 22 in Hilversum, Netherlands.

=== Results ===
Main Card
Weight class				Method	Round	Time	Notes
	Jessie Gibbs	def.	Chuck Grigsby	Decision (Unanimous)	2	5:00
	Jason Jones	def.	Mike Connors	Submission (Punches)	1	1:00
	John Doyle	def.	Richard Plug	Decision (Unanimous)	2	5:00
	Shamar Bailey	def.	Raymond Jarman	TKO (Punches)	2	3:15
	Danny van Bergen	def.	Dave Zitanick	TKO (Punches)	1	2:07
	Akhmed Sultanov	def.	Gurhan Degirmenci	Submission (Triangle Choke)	1	1:07
	Besiki Gerenava	def.	Abdullah Ahmady	Submission (Rear-Naked Choke)	2	3:51
	Sergey Kornev	def.	Ahmed Bayrak	Submission (Neck Crank)	2	1:04
	Magomed Shikshabekov	def.	Fatih Dogan	TKO (Punches)	1	0:35
	Rustam Khabilov	def.	Akin Duran	KO (Slam)	1	0:08
	Yusuke Kawaguchi	def.	Cirio Tejera	Decision (Unanimous)	2	5:00
	Tatsuya Mizuno	def.	Rafael Rodriguez	Submission (Rear-Naked Choke)	1	2:20
	Rikuhei Fujii	def.	Rayco Romero Silva	Decision (Unanimous)	2	5:00
	Hidehiko Hasegawa	def.	Jose Beltran Martinez	Decision (Unanimous)	2	5:00
	Abner Lloveras	def.	Luiz Andrade I	Decision (Unanimous)	2	5:00

== M-1 Global: Breakthrough ==
M-1 Global: Breakthrough was an event held on August 28, 2009 at Memorial Hall in Kansas City, Kansas, United States.

=== Results ===
Main Card
Weight class				Method	Round	Time	Notes
	Muhammed Lawal	def.	Mark Kerr	TKO (Punches)	1	0:25
	Karl Amoussou	def.	John Doyle	Submission (Rear-Naked Choke)	1	3:15
	Lucio Linhares	def.	Mikhail Zayats	Submission (Rear-Naked Choke)	1	1:00
	Jessie Gibbs	def.	Rob Broughton	Decision (Unanimous)	3	5:00
	Michal Kita	def.	Lloyd Marshbanks	Submission (Punches)	1	1:50
	Daisuke Nakamura	def.	Ferrid Kheder	Decision (Unanimous)	3	5:00
	Alexey Oleinik	vs.	Rogent Lloret	Draw (Unanimous)	3	5:00
	Eric Marriott	def.	Tim Bazer	Decision (Unanimous)	3	5:00
	Sean Wilson	def.	Josh Arocho	KO (Punches)	1	3:05
	Rudy Bears	def.	Brendan Seguin	TKO (Punches)	2	1:01
	Mollie Estes	def.	Andria Wawro	TKO (Doctor Stoppage)	1	3:00

== M-1 Challenge: 2009 Selections 6 ==
M-1 Challenge: 2009 Selections 6 was an event held on September 5, 2009 at The President's Palace in Makhachkala, Dagestan, Russia.

=== Results ===
Main Card
Weight class				Method	Round	Time	Notes
	Ibragim Magomedov	def.	Gadzhimurad Nurmagomedov	Submission (Rear-Naked Choke)	1	1:30
	Rasul Magomedov	def.	Khanilav Khanilaev	Submission (Triangle Choke)	3	1:00
	Magomed Sultanakhmedov	def.	Ruslan Khaskhanov	Decision (Split)	2	5:00
	Rustam Khabilov	def.	Gasanali Gasanaliev	Decision (Split)	3	5:00
	Shamil Abdulkerimov	def.	Zagalav Mahachev	Decision (Unanimous)	3	5:00
	Ibragim Ibragimov	def.	Kirill Sidelnikov	TKO (Doctor Stoppage)	1	1:51
	Viktor Nemkov	def.	Rasul Magomedaliev	Submission (Triangle Choke)	1	2:52
	Radmir Gabdullin	def.	Magomed Rabadanov	Decision (Unanimous)	2	5:00
	Alexei Nazarov	def.	Pasha Bamatov	TKO (Punches)	1	3:42
	Djamal Kurbanov	def.	Magomed Aliomarov	Decision (Unanimous)	2	5:00
	Shahmurad Shamhalaev	def.	Mikhail Tigunov	KO (Punch)	1	3:33
	Sabur Ahadov	def.	Evgeniy Slonskiy	Submission (Triangle Choke)	1	1:30
	Shahbulat Shamhalaev	def.	Radzha Hizriev	TKO (Punches)	2	1:22
	Oleg Belenky	def.	Alexander Kosarev	Submission (Rear-Naked Choke)	1	2:11

== M-1 Ukraine: 2009 Selections 1 ==
M-1 Ukraine: 2009 Selections 1 was an event held on September 20, 2009 at The Acco International Exhibition Center in Kyiv, Kyiv Oblast, Ukraine.

=== Results ===
Main Card
Weight class				Method	Round	Time	Notes
	Vladimir Simonyan	def.	Dmitry Padalko	Decision (Unanimous)	3	5:00
	Movses Shaginyan	def.	Emzar Tkeshelashvili	Submission (Armbar)	1	0:00
	Kirill Krikunov	def.	Shota Akulashvili	Submission (Armbar)	2	0:00
	Guram Gugenishvili	def.	Mikhail Rutskiv	Submission (Rear-Naked Choke)	1	2:16
	David Tkeshelashvili	def.	Pavel Snigur	Submission (Rear-Naked Choke)	1	1:04
	Pavel Kusch	def.	Denis Fedorov	Submission (Heel Hook)	1	0:42
	Vadim Khaitulov	def.	Alexander Vykhristyuk	Decision (Unanimous)	2	5:00
	Sergey Yavorsky	def.	Vitaly Lavrov	Submission (Armbar)	1	2:36
	Dmitry Poberezhets	def.	Anton Chuvasov	Submission (Guillotine Choke)	1	2:38
	Sergey Guzev	def.	Aleksey Gonchar	Submission (Achilles Lock)	1	0:40
	Vasily Novikov	def.	Dmitri Goncharenko	Submission (Rear-Naked Choke)	1	1:24
	Igor Grytskiv	def.	Rostislav Khvorost	Decision (Unanimous)	3	5:00
	Mikhail Lysyuchenko	def.	Serhiy Adamchuk	Decision (Unanimous)	2	5:00

== M-1 Challenge 19: 2009 Semifinals ==
M-1 Challenge 19: 2009 Semifinals was an event held on September 26, 2009 in Rostov-on-Don, Rostov Oblast, Russia.

=== Results ===
Main Card
Weight class				Method	Round	Time	Notes
	Rob Broughton	def.	Akhmed Sultanov	Submission (Keylock)	1	4:31
	Besiki Gerenava	def.	Lee Austin	Decision (Unanimous)	3	5:00
	Ansar Chalangov	def.	Matt Thorpe	Submission (Heel Hook)	1	0:41
	Magomed Shikshabekov	def.	Simon Phillips	Submission (Flying Scissor Heel Hook)	1	0:15
	Yuri Ivlev	def.	Scott Hewitt	TKO (Punches)	1	0:54
	Shane del Rosario	def.	Lloyd Marshbanks	TKO (Knee)	1	1:34
	Chuck Grigsby	def.	Spencer Hooker	Decision (Unanimous)	3	5:00
	Gerson Cordeiro	def.	Joao Assis	TKO (Punches)	1	3:50
	Delson Heleno	def.	Fabio Nascimento	Decision (Unanimous)	3	5:00
	Ivan Jorge	def.	Steve Magdaleno	Decision (Unanimous)	3	5:00

== M-1 Challenge: 2009 Selections 7 ==
M-1 Challenge: 2009 Selections 7 was an event held on October 3, 2009 at The Moscow Martial Arts Center in Moscow, Russia.

=== Results ===
Main Card
Weight class				Method	Round	Time	Notes
	Magomed Rashidov	def.	Dmitri Starikov	TKO (Punches)	1	4:04
	Shamil Tinagadjiev	def.	Ilya Malyukov	Submission	1	1:52
	Alikhan Magomedov	def.	Anatoly Lavrov	Submission	1	1:47
	Gadzhi Gadzhiev	def.	Maxim Lunegov	Submission	1	1:55
	Murad Abdulaev	def.	Pavel Kokarev	Submission (Choke)	1	0:00
	Maxim Grishin	def.	Dmitry Zabolotny	TKO (Punches)	1	0:00
	Igor Savelyev	def.	Saipudin Shahidov	TKO (Punches)	2	0:00
	Gasan Umalatov	def.	Murad Magomedov	Decision (Split)	3	5:00
	Magomedrasul Khasbulaev	def.	Gadzhi Dzhangishiev	Submission	1	0:00
	Maxim Kuptsov	def.	Serob Minasyan	Decision (Unanimous)	2	5:00

== M-1 Challenge: 2009 Selections 8 ==
M-1 Challenge: 2009 Selections 8 was an event held on October 4, 2009 at The Moscow Martial Arts Center in Moscow, Russia.

=== Results ===
Main Card
Weight class				Method	Round	Time	Notes
	Alexander Volkov	def.	Abdulhalik Magomedov	TKO (Punches)	1	4:43
	Viktor Nemkov	def.	Ramazan Rezvanov	Submission (Triangle Choke)	1	3:08
	Dibir Zagirov	def.	Alexei Nazarov	Decision (Unanimous)	3	5:00
	Alexander Butenko	def.	Marat Ilaev	Submission (Armbar)	1	4:44
	Magomed Magomedov	def.	Alexey Cherepovsky	Submission (Rear-Naked Choke)	2	2:17
	Gadzhimurad Nurmagomedov	def.	Vladimir Kuchenko	Submission (Rear-Naked Choke)	1	1:40
	Rasul Magomedov	def.	Alexei Belyaev	Decision (Unanimous)	2	5:00
	Ruslan Khaskhanov	def.	Alexey Prokofiev	Submission (Kneebar)	1	0:52
	Rustam Khabilov	def.	Said Khalilov	Decision (Unanimous)	2	5:00
	Yunus Evloev	def.	Zagalav Mahachev	KO (Punches)	1	0:33

== M-1 Challenge: 2009 Selections 9 ==
M-1 Challenge: 2009 Selections 9 was an event held on November 3, 2009 at The World Cinema Studio in Saint Petersburg, Leningrad Oblast, Russia.

=== Results ===
Main Card
Weight class				Method	Round	Time	Notes
	Magomed Khapizov	def.	Salimgirey Rasulov	Decision (Unanimous)	2	5:00
	Khanilav Khanilaev	def.	Makasharip Makasharipov	Decision (Unanimous)	3	5:00
	Magomed Sultanakhmedov	def.	Abdurahman Nurmagomedov	KO (Punch)	1	2:49
	Rashid Magomedov	def.	Shamil Zavurov	Decision (Split)	3	5:00
	Khabib Nurmagomedov	def.	Shahbulat Shamhalaev	Submission (Kimura)	1	4:36
	Magomedtagir Magomedov	def.	David Saakyan	Submission (Rear-Naked Choke)	1	2:09
	Rasul Magomedov	def.	Shamil Tinagadjiev	Decision (Unanimous)	3	5:00
	Dibir Zagirov	def.	Alexander Dzasohov	Decision (Unanimous)	2	5:00
	Alexander Butenko	def.	Bislan Atleshev	Submission (Rear-Naked Choke)	1	2:18
	Magomed Magomedov	def.	Ovanes Ormandzhyan	Submission (Armbar)	1	2:32
	Ali Omarov	def.	Adam Alikhanov	Submission (Rear-Naked Choke)	1	4:24
	Anatoly Tokov	def.	Anatoly Vintovkin	TKO (Punches)	2	0:59

== M-1 Ukraine: 2009 Selections 2 ==
M-1 Ukraine: 2009 Selections 2 was an event held on November 12, 2009 at Simferopol Circus in Simferopol, Crimea, Ukraine.

=== Results ===
Main Card
Weight class				Method	Round	Time	Notes
	Viktor Peresadko	def.	Vladimir Kozhaev	Submission (Rear-Naked Choke)	1	0:00
	Artyom Egorov	def.	Evgeniy Stolyarchuk	Submission (Punches)	1	0:00
	Alexander Agafonov	def.	Artur Markov	Submission (Punches)	1	1:25
	Artem Perehristyuk	def.	Dilyaver Mambetov	Submission (Armbar)	1	0:00
	Peter Gruby	def.	Rustam Rakhmanov	Submission (Rear-Naked Choke)	1	2:20
	Evgeni Babich	def.	Evgeni Kurakin	TKO (Punches)	1	4:40
	Pavel Snigur	def.	Valeri Boyarkin	TKO (Corner Stoppage)	1	0:00
	Viktor Kuzmenko	def.	Denis Fedorov	Submission (Armbar)	1	0:00
	Vladimir Opanasenko	def.	Renat Lyatifov	Submission (Punches)	1	1:10
	Vadim Khaitulov	def.	Yuri Saakyan	Decision (Unanimous)	2	5:00
	Vladena Yavorskaya	def.	Natalia Guzovina	TKO (Punches)	1	0:40
	Nikolai Yatskov	def.	Evgeniy Prokopenko	Submission (Rear-Naked Choke)	1	2:40
	Sergey Grechka	def.	Vitaly Lavrov	Submission (Armbar)	1	2:50

== M-1 Ukraine: 2009 Selections 3 ==
M-1 Ukraine: 2009 Selections 3 was an event held on November 29, 2009 at The Acco International Exhibition Center in Kyiv, Ukraine.

=== Results ===
Main Card
Weight class				Method	Round	Time	Notes
	Oleg Golovin	def.	Nikolai Yatskov	Submission (Heel Hook)	2	3:44
	Alexander Dolotenko	def.	Andrei Tiupin	Submission (Triangle Choke)	1	2:56
	Guram Gugenishvili	def.	Evgeni Babich	Submission (Rear-Naked Choke)	1	0:50
	David Tkeshelashvili	def.	Valeri Boyarkin	Technical Submission (Guillotine Choke)	1	0:23
	Pavel Kusch	def.	Viktor Kuzmenko	Submission (Heel Hook)	1	1:27
	Anatoly Safronov	def.	Aleksander Maliukov	Submission (Guillotine Choke)	1	0:35
	Juri Sahakyan	def.	Nikolai Keda	Submission (Rear-Naked Choke)	2	2:21
	Dmitry Poberezhets	def.	Konstantyn Stryzhak	TKO (Corner Stoppage)	1	3:34
	Sergey Guzev	def.	Saipudin Shahidov	Submission (Rear-Naked Choke)	1	3:17
	Igor Shpatenko	def.	Vasily Novikov	TKO (Leg Injury)	1	4:55
	Evgeni Fomenko	def.	Igor Grytskiv	Decision (Unanimous)	2	5:00
	Peter Gruby	def.	Kirill Krikunov	Decision (Unanimous)	3	5:00
	Andrei Glushko	def.	Viktor Peresadko	Decision (Unanimous)	2	5:00
	Alexander Agafonov	def.	Moses Shahinyan	Decision (Unanimous)	2	5:00

== M-1 Challenge 20: 2009 Finals ==
M-1 Challenge 20: 2009 Finals was an event held on December 3, 2009 at The Ice Palace Saint Petersburg in Saint Petersburg, Leningrad Oblast, Russia.

=== Results ===
Main Card
Weight class				Method	Round	Time	Notes
	Pavel Kusch	def.	Ho Jin Kim	Submission (Heel Hook)	1	0:38
	Gadzhimurad Omarov	def.	Lloyd Marshbanks	TKO (Corner Stoppage)	3	4:07
	Besiki Gerenava	def.	Chuck Grigsby	Decision (Split)	3	5:00
	Ansar Chalangov	def.	Danilo Pereira	Submission (Heel Hook)	1	3:17
	Magomed Shikshabekov	def.	Gerson Cordeiro	Submission (Triangle Armbar)	1	2:06
	Yuri Ivlev	def.	Ivan Jorge	TKO (Punches)	2	4:11
	Mikhail Zayats	def.	Sang Soo Lee	Decision (Unanimous)	3	5:00
	Alexander Volkov	def.	Ibragim Magomedov	Decision (Unanimous)	3	5:00
	Khanilav Khanilaev	def.	Viktor Nemkov	Decision (Split)	3	5:00
	Magomed Sultanakhmedov	def.	Dmitry Samoilov	KO (Head Kick and Punches)	2	4:25
	Rashid Magomedov	def.	Alexei Nazarov	Decision (Unanimous)	3	5:00
	Yunus Evloev	def.	Magomed Magomedov	TKO (Punches)	2	4:45
	Maxim Grishin	def.	Levan Persaev	TKO (Knee)	1	1:56
	Vyacheslav Vasilevsky	def.	Artur Korchemny	Submission (Punches)	1	2:20
	Daria Ibragimova	def.	Vladena Yavorskaya	Submission (Armbar)	2	1:54

== M-1 Ukraine: 2009 Selections 4 ==
M-1 Ukraine: 2009 Selections 4 was an event held on December 24, 2009 at The Acco International Exhibition Center in Kyiv, Ukraine.

=== Results ===
Main Card
Weight class				Method	Round	Time	Notes
	Daria Ibragimova	def.	Tatiana Montyan	Decision (Unanimous)	2	5:00
	Guram Gugenishvili	def.	Dmitry Poberezhets	Decision (Unanimous)	2	5:00
	Sergey Guzev	def.	David Tkeshelashvili	KO (Punch)	3	1:47
	Pavel Kusch	def.	Vasily Novikov	Submission (Rear-Naked Choke)	2	3:54
	Igor Grytskiv	def.	Anatoly Safronov	Submission (Rear-Naked Choke)	2	4:08
	Evgeni Khavilov	def.	Peter Gruby	Decision (Unanimous)	2	5:00
	Sergey Grechka	def.	Andrei Prizyuk	TKO (Retirement)	2	5:00
	Evgeni Boldyrev	def.	Alexander Romaschenko	TKO (Foot Injury)	1	1:58
	Vasily Klepikov	def.	Valeri Boyarkin	TKO (Corner Stoppage)	1	1:19
	Igor Shpatenko	def.	Yaroslav Yaroshenko	Submission (Armbar)	1	0:53
	Vladimir Opanasenko	def.	Evgeni Fomenko	Submission (Triangle Choke)	1	2:30
	Yuri Saakyan	def.	Kirill Krikunov	Submission (Anaconda Choke)	2	2:19
	Serhiy Adamchuk	def.	Shota Akulashvili	TKO (Corner Stoppage)	1	5:00

== See also ==
- M-1 Global
