= Zambian National Amateur League =

Mixed Martial Arts league

- Current season, competition or edition: ZNAL 12 (2026 season)
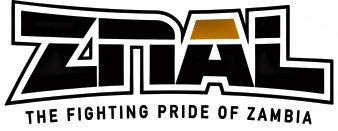
- Sport: Martial Art
- Owner: Mixed Martial Arts Zambia
- No. of teams: 10
- Country: Zambia
- Broadcaster: ZNBC

Zambian National Amateur League ZNAL is a Zambian Mixed Martial Arts League Founded by Mixed Martial Arts Zambia in 2022. It is the first ever MMA League in Zambia where individual Athletes compete to gain Amateur experience before turning professional. The ZNAL was introduced to help Zambian athletes qualify to the elite level and to help MMA Zambia come up with a team to represent Zambia at World Championships. IMMAF suggests that each athlete has to win at least 10 fights to qualify to the elite level.
