= Radmir Gabdullin =

Russian mixed martial arts (MMA) fighter and coach

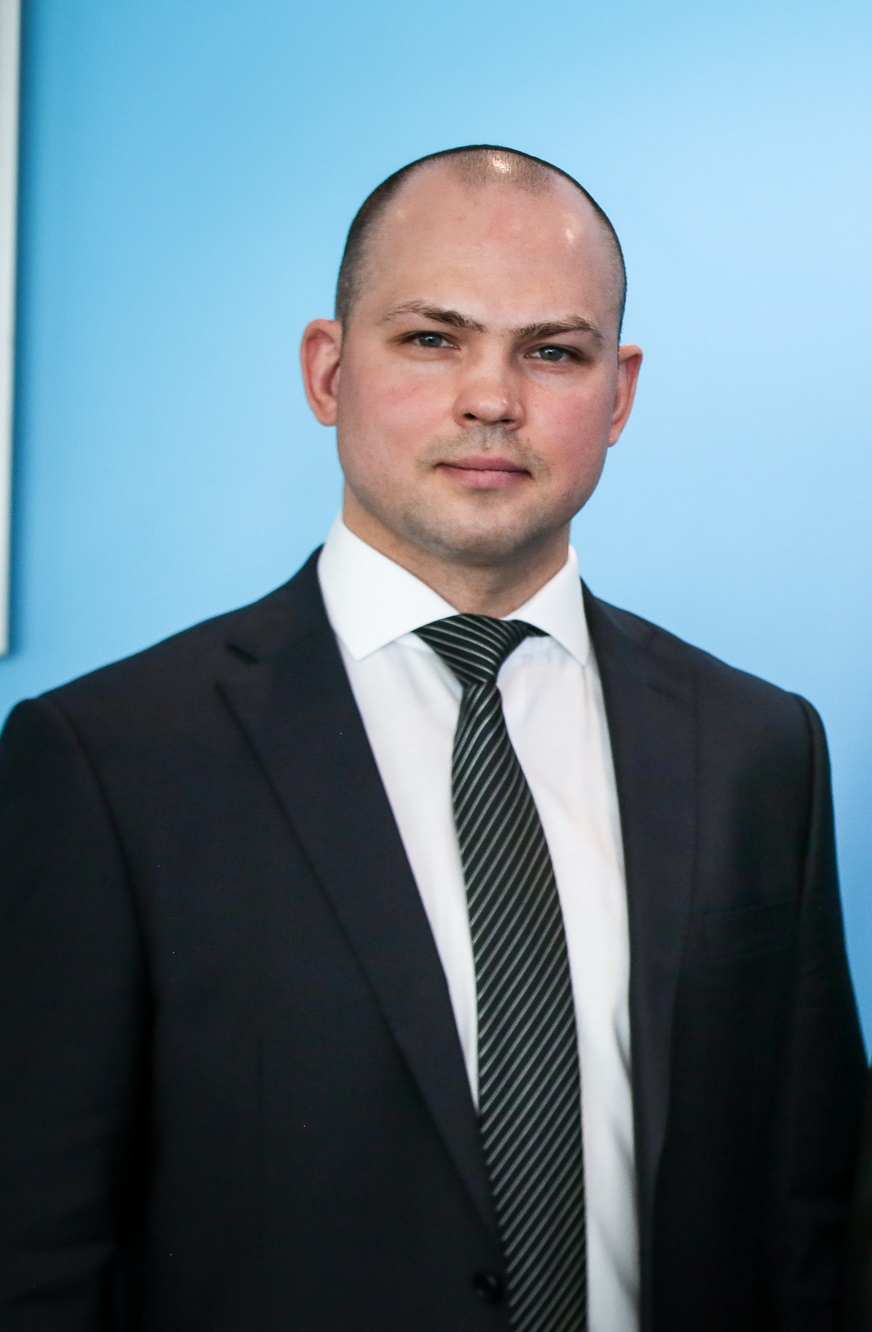
- Born: 20 December 1987 (age 37); Oktyabrsky, Bashkir ASSR, USSR
- Education: Russian State University of Physical Education, Sport, Youth and Tourism, RANEPA, Russian International Olympic University
- Occupation: President of the Russian MMA Union

Radmir Gabdullin (Russian: Радми́р Илда́рович Габду́ллин; born 20 December 1987 in Oktyabrsky, Bashkir ASSR, USSR) is a Russian athlete and sports functionary, President of the All-Russian public organization "Union of Mixed Martial Arts "MMA" of Russia" (Russian MMA Union).

Radmir Gabdullin started his career in MMA as a professional athlete, became the winner of various tournaments, was a sparring partner of Fedor Emelianenko. He was also the coach of the Russian national MMA team for several years. He served as the Chief Referee of WMMAA, Chairman of the All-Russian Collegium of Referees in mixed martial arts, and the First vice-president of the Russian MMA Union. Since 2018, Radmir Gabdullin has become the president of the Russian MMA Union, replacing Fedor Emelianenko. The Russian MMA Union is the main regulatory organization in the Russian Federation for mixed martial arts.

== Education ==
In 2010, Radmir Gabdullin graduated from the Russian State University of Physical Education, Sport, Youth and Tourism (SCOLIPE) with a degree in Physical Education and Sports. In 2013, he graduated from The Russian Presidential Academy of National Economy and Public Administration (RANEPA) with a degree in Management. In 2016, he also graduated from the Russian International Olympic University with a degree in Sports Management.

== Mixed martial arts career ==
=== Mixed martial arts athlete ===
Prior to joining MMA, Radmir Gabdullin was engaged in combat sambo. In 2007–2009, he took part in seven professional MMA tournaments, organized by the M-1 Global promotion company. In 2007–2008, these were tournaments of the M-1 MFC series, in 2008–2009, these were match tournaments of the M-1 Challenge series. In five of them, he won victories in his weight category. Radmir Gabdullin finished his career as an athlete in 2010 due to a worsening injury.

=== Mixed martial arts record ===
Professional record breakdown
7 matches	5 wins	2 losses
By submission	4	1
By decision	1	1

Res.	Record	Opponent	Method	Event	Date	Round	Time	Location	Notes
Win		Magomed Rabadanov	Decision (Unanimous)	M-1 Challenge: 2009 Selections 6	5 September 2009	2	5:00	Makhachkala, Russia	
Loss		Giva Santana	Submission (Triangle Choke)	M-1 Challenge 17 - Korea	4 July 2009	1	3:47	Seoul, South Korea	
Win		Artur Avakyan	Submission (Achilles Lock)	M-1 Challenge - 2009 Selections 1	13 March 2009	1	0:00	Saint Petersburg, Russia	
Win		Hoon Kim	Submission (Triangle Choke)	M-1 Challenge 11: 2008 Challenge Finals	11 January 2009	2	0:35	Amstelveen, Netherlands	
Loss		Min Suk Heo	Decision (Unanimous)	M-1 Challenge 6 - Korea	29 August 2008	2	5:00	Seoul, South Korea	
Win		Jonathan Leon	Submission	M-1 MFC - Fedor Emelianenko Cup	15 May 2008	1	0:00	Saint Petersburg, Russia	
Win		Alexei Belyaev	Submission (Armbar)	M-1 MFC - Battle on the Neva 1	21 July 2007	1	N/A	Saint Petersburg, Russia	

=== Mixed martial arts functionary ===
In 2012, he started working at the Specialized Sports School of the Olympic Reserve in Martial Arts in the city of Mytishchi, firstly as an instructor-methodologist, then as Deputy Director for educational and sports work. He worked in this position until 2015.

The Russian MMA Union was founded on May 16, 2012. In the same year, the All-Russian Collegium of Referees was founded within the Union. Radmir Gabdullin was elected as the Collegium chairman. Selection of the referees and organization of refereeing for the championships of the federal districts, the finals of the championships, and the Russian MMA cups began to be carried out under his direct supervision. On September 30, the Russian MMA Union became a permanent member of the WMMAA. Radmir Gabdullin became also the chief referee of WMMAA In November 2012, the Russian MMA Union held the first European MMA championship in St. Petersburg. A year later that city hosted the World championship, where Radmir Gabdullin also was a referee (as a deputy chief referee). In 2014, the Russian MMA Union was accredited as the All-Russian Sports Federation for MMA.

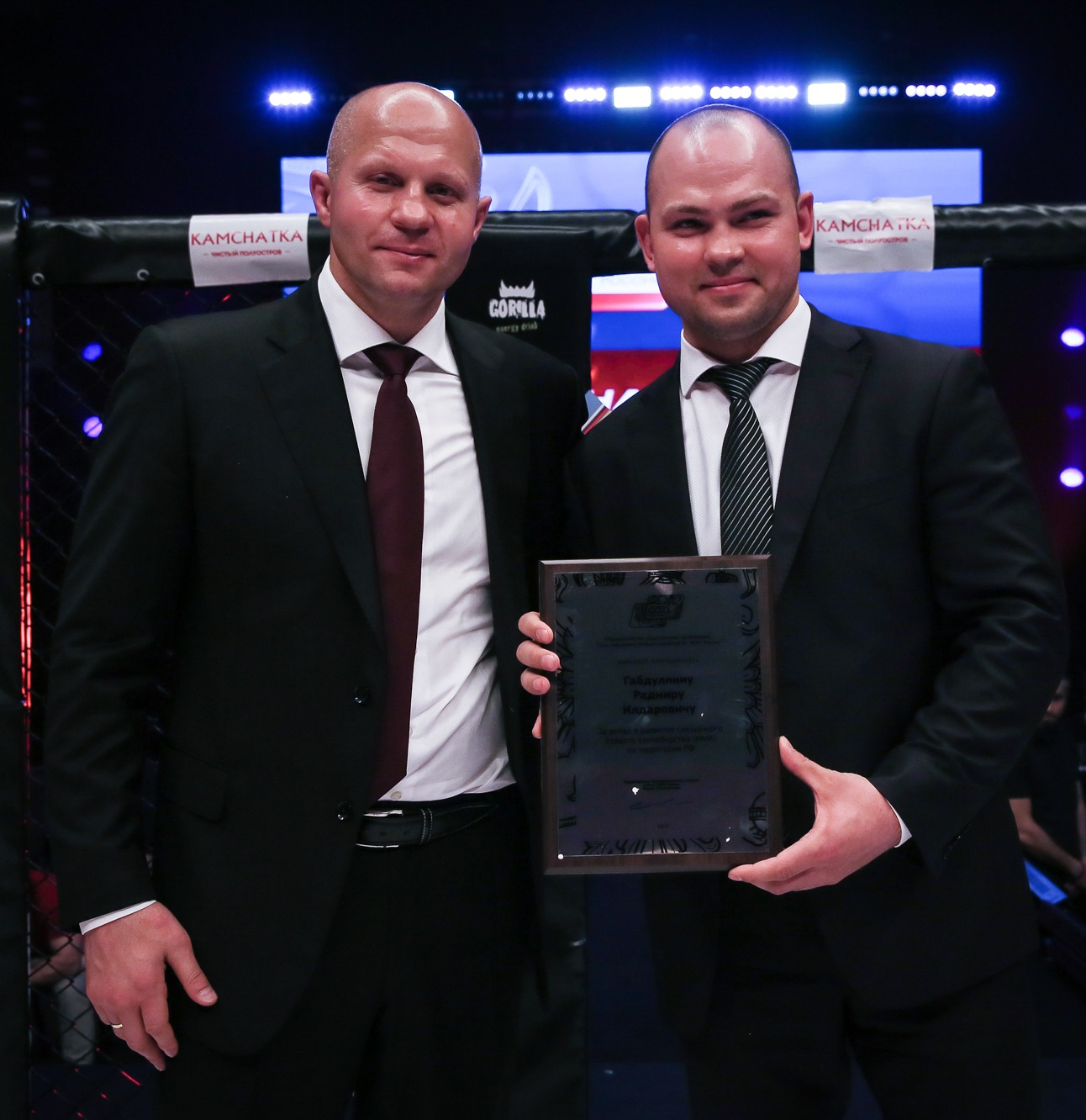
Fedor Emelianenko and Radmir Gabdullin

In addition to the functions of a referee, in 2013-2018 Radmir Gabdullin was the coach of the Russian national MMA team. In December 2016, he was elected as the First vice-president of the Russian MMA Union. He held this position for two years. At that time, he was in fact engaged in the operational management of the federation. In October 2018, at the presidium, Radmir Gabdullin was elected as the president of the Russian MMA Union. He replaced Fedor Emelianenko, who became the Honorary President and Chairman of the Supervisory Board.

The merger of IMMAF and WMMAA was an important event in 2018. This became the next step for MMA to be recognized as an Olympic kind of sport. In November 2018, Bahrain hosted the first World championship after the merger of the two international governing bodies of the MMA. Various tournaments for adults and juniors were held at the same time. A record number of countries took part in them – 52. More than 370 athletes competed for 26 sets of medals. It was the first international tournament since Radmir Gabdullin was elected as the president of the Russian MMA Union. The Russian national team formed by this organization achieved high results at that tournament. The Russian team won an overall final victory in the medal standings and set new records for the World championships: in the number of finalists among adults – 7, in the number of gold medals among juniors – 5. As a result of the tournament, the Russian team rose in the world ranking of the national teams to the first place in the junior standings and to the third place in the adult standings.
