= Russian MMA Union =

Union of Mixed Martial Arts "MMA" of Russia
- Союз смешанных боевых единоборств «ММА» России
- Sport: MMA
- Jurisdiction: Russia
- Abbreviation: Russian MMA Union
- Founded: 2012
- Affiliation: IMMAF (suspended)
- Headquarters: Moscow
- President: Radmir Gabdullin

Official website
- mmaunion.ru

Union of Mixed Martial Arts "MMA" of Russia (abbreviated as "Russian MMA Union") is an all-Russian public organization, a sports federation engaged in the popularization and development of mixed martial arts as a kind of sport. It is the main regulator for MMA in the Russian Federation. Founded in 2012. In the first year of its existence, the Russian MMA Union held the national mixed martial arts championship in Chekhov, Moscow Oblast, became a permanent member of the World Mixed Martial Arts Association (WMMAA) and held the European mixed martial arts Championship in St. Petersburg under WMMAA auspices. As of 2021, the Russian MMA Union included 80 accredited regional federations in its structure, ensures the holding of the national championships and cups, forms Russian national teams to participate in the World and European championships, represents Russia in the International Mixed Martial Arts Federation (IMMAF), provides refereeing and organizational support for professional MMA tournaments spent in Russia (both by the Russian and international promoters, including UFC).

After the 2022 Russian invasion of Ukraine the IMMAF suspended the membership of the Russian MMA Union. It barred the Russian federation from participating in all IMMAF Championships, and banned the organisation of IMMAF events in Russia.

== History ==
All-Russian public organization “Russian MMA Union” was founded on May 16, 2012. The main goals of the Union are to consolidate all the forces associated with the development of the mixed martial arts (MMA) in Russia, to popularize and develop it, to form a united nationwide federation with an extensive network of branches in the regions, to set order to the rules of competitions and the methods of training athletes and referees. Also, the goals of the Union are streamlining the structure of the tournaments, preparing the national teams of the Russian Federation for participation at the World, European, and other international championships. Fedor Emelianenko was elected as the president. Radmir Gabdullin was elected as the chairman of the All-Russian Collegium of the Referees. A few months later, on September 27, mixed martial arts was officially recognized in Russia as a kind of sport and entered into the All-Russian Register of Sports.

The first Russian championship in mixed martial arts was held on September 28–30, 2012 in Chekhov, Moscow Oblast. About 180 athletes took part in the competition. They represented clubs from various regions of the country and all of them had titles in sports not lower than a Candidate for Master of Sport (a title for the athletes in Russia) in a fighting or wrestling kind of sport. Only fighters with no more than three professional fights were allowed to participate.

During the first year of work of the Russian MMA Union, representatives of more than 50 regions of the Russian Federation entered the Union. Matches were judged by the referees who previously worked at the professional tournaments M-1 Challenge and M-1 Selection. In addition to the federal ones, regional qualifying tournaments in mixed martial arts began to be held, and they began to be broadcast live on television and Internet channels.

On September 30, the Russian MMA Union became a permanent member of the World Mixed Martial Arts Association (WMMAA). In November 2012, the Russian MMA Union held the first European MMA championship under the auspices of the WMMAA. The championship was held in St. Petersburg, with the participation of the representatives from 15 countries. A year later, in October 2013, the Russian MMA Union also held the MMA World Championship in the same city, with the participation of the representatives from more than forty countries. The championship was held as a part of the World Martial Arts Games.

In 2014, the Russian MMA Union was accredited as the All-Russian Sports Federation for Mixed Martial Arts.

In 2016, the Russian MMA Union held the European mixed martial arts championship in St. Petersburg according to the WMMAA for the second time. On December 18, 2016, Fedor Emelianenko was re-elected as the President of the All-Russian public organization "Russian Mixed Martial Arts Union" for the second term at the reporting and election conference of the organization. October 20, 2018, at the presidium, Radmir Gabdullin was elected as the new President of the Russian MMA Union. He replaced Fedor Emelianenko, who became the Honorary President and Chairman of the Supervisory Board.

The merger of IMMAF and WMMAA was an important event in 2018. This became the next step for MMA to be recognized as an Olympic sports. In November 2018, Bahrain hosted the first World championship after the merger of the two international governing bodies of the MMA. Various tournaments for adults and juniors were held at the same time. A record number of countries took part in them is 52. More than 370 athletes competed for 26 sets of medals. The Russian national team achieved high results at that tournament. The Russian team won an overall final victory in the medal standings and set new records for the World championships: in the number of finalists among adults – 7, in the number of gold medals among juniors – 5. As a result of the tournament, the Russian team rose in the world ranking of the national teams to the first place in the junior standings and to the third place in the adult standings.

The national team formed following the results of the 2019 Russian championship won the highest number of medals at the European championship held in Italy in June, 2019. Medals were also won in the women's competition. After this tournament, the Russian men's team moved to second place in the world ranking. In November 2019, the team won an overall victory at the MMA World championship, held in Bahrain again. More than 500 athletes from 76 countries took part in it. The Russian national team won both in the junior and adult standings with an almost two-fold superiority in the number of medals.

In the 2020 season, most MMA tournaments (the Russian championship and the European and World championships) were canceled due to the COVID-19 pandemic. The Russian MMA Union announced a busy calendar for 2021. In addition to the federal tournament, regional championships must be held in each constituent entity of Russia. In addition, in August 2021, Russia should host the European MMA championship for the first time since the merger of the two main international MMA federations, The championship should be held in Kazan.

== Structure of the Federation ==
The supreme governing body of the Union is a conference, that is held at least once a year. In addition, a reporting and election conference is held at least once every four years. Conferences participants are the members of the Presidium, as well as the representatives of the Union's regional branches. The number of the regional representatives must be at least 75% of the total number of the votes of the members participating in making decisions of the conference. During conferences, all the main regulatory documents are approved by a simple majority of votes. Elections for an each important leadership position of this sports federation are held in the same way. The Presidium of the Union is a permanent collegial governing body. It executes all the rights of a legal entity on behalf of the Union.

=== Presidents ===
№	Portrait	Name	In office	
1		Fedor Emelianenko	16 May 2012	20 October 2018
2		Radmir Gabdullin	20 October 2018	current president

== Russian MMA Union competitions ==
=== Russian MMA Championships ===
Since 2012, the Russian MMA Union annually holds the Russian Championship and Cup in mixed martial arts (the only exception was 2020, when federal tournaments were not held due to the COVID-19 pandemic).

First of all, the current World and European champions from Russia, the winners of the championships of the federal districts, the winners of the Russian championship at the age of 18-20 are admitted to participate in the national championships. Additionally, there is a quota for the host side. Also, priority is given to the winners of the Moscow Open Cup and the Russian Cup.

In May 2019, the Russian MMA Union held the Russian mixed martial arts championship that marked the debut of the women's competition. It is being actively developed by IMMAF, as a part of the efforts towards the recognition of MMA by the Olympic movement. A kind of sport must follow the Olympic Charter. One of its criteria is gender parity in sports. The following was written about the tournament on the official IMMAF website: “Perhaps this is the most impressive domestic competition in the field of the amateur MMA”. It was noted that there are about twenty thousand active amateur athletes in Russia. A significant number of fighters have become professionals, performing in UFC, Bellator, PFL, M-1 tournaments, etc.

At the regional level, local federations, members of the Russian MMA Union, annually hold tournaments that have the status of the regional championships and federal districts championships. The winners of the federal districts championships are guaranteed to qualify for the Russian Federation championship. The best participants of the championship are selected to the national team. Regional tournaments often have a large number of participants, that sometimes exceeds three hundred fighters. Competitions are actively covered by the local and sometimes federal media. Russian championships are held for the juniors in the age categories 14-15, 16-17, and 18–20 years old. Also, the Russian MMA Union regularly holds all-Russian tournaments outside the classification with the participation of adults and youth.

The table shows the Russian mixed martial arts championships held by the Russian MMA Union, listing the champions in all weight categories:

Year	Date	Place	Champions											
Year	Date	Place	52,2 kg	56,7 kg	61,2 kg	65,8 kg	70,3 kg	77,1 kg	83,9 kg	93 kg	120,2/93+ kg*	120,2+ kg*	Team of subjects	Team of districts
2019	2-6 may	Moscow	Farkhod Rakhmonaliev	Ruslan Satiev	Gadzhimurad Zakayev	Ahmed Gazimagomedov	Murad Umachiev	Rustam Hadisgadjiev	Yusup Magomedov	Magomed Shakhrudinov	Shamil Kuramagomedov	Khamzat Taisumov	Moscow	NCFD
2018	12-13 may	Chelyabinsk	nb	Magomedrasul Sheikhmagomedov	Kasum Kasumov	Musa Kazikhanov	Islam Omarov	Shamidkhan Magomedov	Gadzhi Omargadzhiev	Muslim Magomedov	Rizvan Kuniev	nb	nb	NCFD
2017	11 may	Rostov-on-Don	nb	Magomedrasul Sheikhmagomedov	Sharapudin Magomedov	Nabi Ashurlaev	Islam Omarov	Kamal Magomedov	Magomed Umalatov	Gadzimurad Bashirov	Rizvan Kuniev	nb	nb	Moscow**
2016	26-27 may	Orenburg	nb	nb	Omar Nurmagomedov	Kurban Taygibov	Murad Ramazanov	Alibeg Rasulov	Gamzat Hiramagomedov	Magomed Ankalaev	Amirkhan Isagadzhiev	nb	nb	nb
2015	28-30 may	Omsk	nb	nb	Bahachali Bakhachaliev	Magomed Yunusilau	Haji Rabadanov	Gadzhimurad Hiramagomedov	Gamzat Hiramagomedov	Magomed Ankalaev	Rizvan Kuniev	nb	nb	nb
2014	7-8 June	Khanty-Mansiysk	nb	nb	nb	Magomed Yunusilau	Ramazan Suleybanov	Gadzhimurad Hiramagomedov	Shamil Abdulaev	Magomed Ankalaev	Znaur Khetagurov	nb	nb	nb
2013	3 June	Chelyabinsk	nb	nb	nb	Said Nurmagomedov	Murad Mirzabekov	Kamal Magomedov	Shamil Abdulaev	Rashid Yusupov	Znaur Khetagurov	nb	nb	nb
2012	28-30 September	Chekhov	nb	nb	nb	Magomed Magomedov	Rakhman Makhazhiev	Rasul Abdulaev	Magomed Mutaev	Magomed Ismailov	Mikhail Gazaev	nb	Leningrad Oblast	nb

^{*} — in the 2012-2018 Russian championships, 93+ kg was considered the heaviest weight category. Since 2019, instead of it, there are 120.2 kg and 120.2+ kg categories.
^{**} — in 2017-2018, the team score was held only among the federal districts of the Russian Federation, the Moscow team was equated to the district team.
nb — there were no battles in this classification.

Since 2019, Russian mixed martial arts championships have been also held among women. The table shows the held tournaments with women's standings, listing the champions among women in all weight categories:

Year	Date	Place	Champions					
Year	Date	Place	47,6 kg	52,2 kg	56,7 kg	61,2 kg	65,8 kg	70,8 kg
2019	2-6 may	Moscow	Daria Nyrkova	Karina Ivanova	Zemfira Alieva	Daria Tereschenko	Tatiana Postarnakova	Olga Rusina

=== World and European Championships held by the Russian MMA Union ===
The Russian MMA Union has twice hosted the largest international competitions in the field of amateur MMA. The 2012 and 2016 European Championships, as well as the 2013 WMMAA World Championship, were held in St. Petersburg. In August 2021, for the first time since the merger of the two main international MMA federations, Russia should host the European championship in that kind of sport. The championship should be held in Kazan.

The table shows the World and European MMA championships held by the Russian MMA Union:

Year	Date	Tournament	Place	Total teams	Total fighters	Total Gold medals	Team winner
2021*	16-21 August	European MMA Championship	Kazan				
2016**	20-21 October	European MMA Championship	Saint Petersburg	nd	nd	7	Russia
2013**	19-20 October	World MMA Championship	Saint Petersburg	37	nd	6	Russia
2012**	13-14 November	European MMA Championship	Saint Petersburg	15	56	6	Russia

^{*} — expected tournament, ^{**} — WMMAA European and World Championships, nd — no data

== Russian national MMA team ==
The Russian Federation national team is formed by the Russian MMA Union. There are permanent members who form two line-ups. Until 2018, the first line-up was formed for the World Championships, the second line-up was formed for the European Championships. They were also joined by athletes who successfully performed at the national championship. Gold medalists took part in the world championships, silver medalists participated in the European championships. In 2019, the Russian national team became one of the ten leading MMA teams in the world, who took permission from the International Mixed Martial Arts Federation (IMMAF) to bring two line-ups to the World Championships at once. As a result, the Russian national team includes the owners of both gold and silver medals of the national championship to participate in the World Championship.

After the merger of the two leading MMA federations, competition in the world's best tournaments in this sport has intensified. Nevertheless, the multi-stage selection system for the national team, introduced by the Russian MMA Union, gave positive results. Russian Federation national team became the winner of all three tournaments of the World and European Championship rank that took place after the merge. In the world ranking, complied with taking the athletes’ individual scores into account, the men's team of the Russian MMA Union has been in the second place among adult athletes (out of 62 teams) and in the first place among juniors (out of 37 teams) since 2019. The line-up of the Russian youth national MMA team is formed based on the results of the national MMA championship among juniors in the 18-20 age group. The head coach of the Russian national teams is Gennady Kapshay.

=== World champions ===
The table shows the World champions who were included in these tournaments in the line-up of the Russian national teams that were formed by the Russian MMA Union:

Year	Date	Place	Champions										Medal table			
Year	Date	Place	52,2 kg	56,7 kg	61,2 kg	65,8 kg	70,3 kg	77,1 kg	83,9 kg	93 kg	120,2/93+ kg*	120,2+ kg*	Gold	Silver	Bronze	Total
2019	11-16 November	Bahrain, Manama	х	х	Gadzhimurad Zavaev	Akhmed Gazimagomedov	Murad Umachiev	x	Gazimurad Magomedov	x	Gazimurad Bagaudinov	х	5	4	10	19
2018	11-18 November	Bahrain, Manama	х	Ruslan Satiev	Sharapudin Magomedov	х	х	Islam Bagomedov	Jamal Medzhikov	Magomed Shakhrudinov	х	х	5	3	1	9
2017**	6-7 October	Kazakhstan, Astana	нп	х	Gadzhimurad Zavaev	Abdulmutalib Gairbekov	Ali Abdulkhalikov	Shamil Musaev	Magomed Shakhrudinov	Muslim Magomedov	Anatoly Malykhin	nb	7	0	0	7
2016**	26 November	China, Macau	nb	nb	Omar Nurmagomedov	Kurban Taygibov	Murad Ramazanov	Alibeg Rasulov	Gamzat Hiramagomedov	Magomed Ankalaev	Amirkhan Isagadzhiev	nb	7	0	0	7
2015**	28 November	Czech Republic, Prague	nb	nb	Bahachali Bakhachaliev	Magomed Yunusilau	Haji Rabadanov	Gadzhimurad Hiramagomedov	Gamzat Hiramagomedov	Magomed Ankalaev	х	nb	6	0	1	7
2014**	11-12 September	Belarus, Minsk	nb	nb	nb	Magomed Yunusilau	Ramazan Suleybanov	Gadzhimurad Hiramagomedov	Shamil Abdulaev	х	х	nb	4	1	0	5
2013**	19-20 October	Russia, Saint Petersburg	nb	nb	nb	Said Nurmagomedov	x	x	x	Rashid Yusupov	Znaur Khetagurov	nb	3	1	2	6

^{*} — in the 2012-2017 WMMAA World championships, 93+ kg was considered the heaviest weight category. Since 2018, instead of it, there are 120.2 kg and 120.2+ kg categories in the IMMAF+WMMAA World championships
^{**} — 2012-2017 WMMAA World championships, nb – there were no battles in this weight category, х – gold medal not won

=== European champions ===
The table shows the European champions who were included in these tournaments in the line-up of the Russian national teams that were formed by the Russian MMA Union:

Year	Date	Place	Champions										Medal table			
Year	Date	Place	52,2 kg	56,7 kg	61,2 kg	65,8 kg	70,3 kg	77,1 kg	83,9 kg	93 kg	120,2/93+ kg*	120,2+ kg*	Gold	Silver	Bronze	Total
2019	18-23 June	Italy, Rome	Zagirkhan Ibragimov	Akhmed Nutsalkhanov	х	х	Dorobshokh Nabotov	х	х	х	Omar Aliev	Shamsutdin Makhmudov	5	4	10	19
2018**	11-14 October	Spain, Guadalajara	nb	Magomedrasul Sheikhmagomedov	Kasum Kasumov	Musa Kazikhanov	Islam Omarov	Shamidkhan Magomedov	x	Muslim Magomedov	Rizvan Kuniev	nb	7	0	1	8
2017**	8-9 December	Germany, Dresden	nb	Magomedrasul Sheikhmagomedov	Sharapudin Magomedov	Nabi Ashurlaev	Islam Omarov	Kamal Magomedov	Magomed Umalatov	Gadzimurad Bashirov	Rizvan Kuniev	nb	8	0	0	8
2016**	20-21 October	Russia, Saint Petersburg	nb	nb	Kasum Kasumov	Nabi Ashurlaev	Shamil Musaev	Hiramagomedov Gadzhimurad	Shamil Abdulaev	Magomed Shakhrudinov	Rizvan Kuniev	nb	7	0	0	7
2015	Турнир не проводился															
2014**	15-16 November	Azerbaijan, Baku	nb	nb	nb	Rasul Khabirov	Kamil Magomedov	Alibeg Rasulov	Gamzat Khiramagomedov	Valentin Moldavsky	х	nb	5	1	0	6
2013**	15 June	Ukraine, Kyiv	nb	nb	nb	Said Nurmagomedov	x	Alexey Belozertsev	x	Rashid Yusupov	Ilya Shcheglov	nb	4	1	0	5
2012**	13-14 November	Russia, Saint Petersburg	nb	nb	nb	Magomed Magomedov	Rakhman Makhazhiev	Rasul Abdulaev	Magomed Mutaev	Magomed Ismailov	Mikhail Gazaev	nb	6	0	0	6

^{*} — in the 2012-2018 WMMAA European championships, 93+ kg was considered the heaviest weight category. Since 2019, instead of it, there are 120.2 kg and 120.2+ kg categories in the IMMAF+WMMAA European championships
^{**} — 2012-2018 WMMAA European championships, nb – there were no battles in this weight category, х – gold medal not won
