= R-1 Federation =

R-1 World Federation of Mixed Impact Martial Arts

R-1 World Federation
- Type: Public
- Industry: Mixed martial arts promotion
- Founder: Ruslan Sunovarov
- Headquarters: Moscow, Russia
- Key people: Roy Jones Jr.
- Website: http://r1-federation.ru/

The Federation of Mixed Impact Martial Arts R-1 is a promotional organization aimed at mixed martial arts "R-1" development and popularization in Russia. The R-1 Federation unites various aspects of martial arts. R-1 rules are based on research into preferences of tournament participants and spectators. The rules are intended to guarantee maximum entertainment. A related product called Combat Time R-1 emerged on the world professional sports arena.

The international representative of the organization is the world boxing champion in four weight classes, actor and singer Roy Jones Jr.

== Rules ==
- R-1 brings together all kinds of impact martial arts. No wrestling, no takedowns, and no submission holds. The only exception to the rule is a clinch when one is shocked.
- If one is by the opponent, one may try to enter into a clinch under-hook (hold under both arms) to recover. Upon recovery, the fighter must escape the clinch. A throw from a clinch results in disqualification. Muay Thai clinches are disallowed: on the first occurrence, the combat may continue with a warning; if it recurs, a second warning is followed by disqualification.
- No takedowns. A second takedown in a match means disqualification.
- The opponent cannot be finished off on the ground. If one occurrence does not stop the fight, the combat can continue. If the fight ended, the combat is replayed. A second time results in disqualification.
- Elbow punches mean disqualification.
- After a knockdown standing over the opponent is allowed once. A second time is disqualifying.
- In a clinch, more than two knee strikes is not allowed.

=== Rounds ===
Rating fights consist of three two-minute rounds.

Title fights consist of five two-minute rounds with rest of one minute. A title combat that results in a draw is awarded to the current champion.

Matches can be completed by knockout, technical knockout, decision, disqualification, draw, or no avail. The referee and ringside doctor can stop the fight. Combat is judged by three judges on a ten-point system: the winner of each round receives ten points and the loser receives nine or fewer; if the round is equal, both receive ten points. If, after five or seven rounds the sum of points is equal, the judges appoint one additional two-minute round.

Judges judge only the extra round. In a draw after additional rounds, the judges evaluate the fight as a whole. The fight can be reckoned a draw if both fighters fall and can not get up at the same time, or in the case of accidental injury in the final stages. A draw requires the fighters to accept a rematch; if one fighter refuses or fails, the victory is awarded to the opponent.

=== Weight classes ===
- up to 67 kg
- 67 to 71 kg
- 71 to 76 kg
- 76 to 81 kg
- 81 to 86 kg
- 86 to 91 kg
- over 91 kg
- R-1 judge form

=== Fighter form ===
Shorts above the knee, bandage, naked torso, mouthguard and 10 oz standard gloves with "R-1" logo. No leg defense.

=== Three knockdowns ===
Three knockdowns in one round imply a victory by TKO. After each knockdown, the referee counts to eight and then decides whether the fighter can continue. A fighter can be saved by the bell in the last round.

=== Permitted maneuvers ===
==== Punches ====
- jab - straight punch
- hook - side punch
- uppercut - a punch from the bottom to the top
- backfist - punch with turning around

==== Kicks ====
- front kick - front straight kick
- side kick - straight kick toward the side of the head or body
- hook kick - side kick
- roundhouse kick - round
- heel-kick - heel kick to the abdomen with a turn of 360 degrees
- crescent-kick - semicircle kick
- ex-kick - chopping kick
- jumping-kick - kick in the air
- footsweeps - sweeps

Knee strikes: in jump, from the place, in the inner and outer thigh.

In a clinch after two knee strikes, a fighter must break the clinch, but can continue to attack with arms and legs (but not the knees).

Footsweeps are allowed only foot by the foot.

=== Shootout tournaments ===
Each match lasts five rounds of two minutes. The knockdown rule is two knockdowns rule in all matches except the final. If, for any reason, the victorious fighter is not able to continue, then a spare competitor replaces him in the next fight. Exceptions to this rule include a fighter who lost a match by knockout cannot serve as a replacement.

=== Fouls ===
- punches with head and elbow
- punching in the groin
- grappling, throws and locks
- strangulation
- throat punch
- attacking an opponent who is down or getting up
- attacking an opponent after the referee calls a break
- holding the ropes
- directing offensive language to the referee
- attacking the back of the head
- attempting to cause the opponent to fall out of the ring
- voluntarily leaving the ring during a match
- attacking an opponent who shows his back;
- passive fighting with continuous holding and clinching
- holding the kicking leg or head with both hands

=== Penalties ===
- Caution (verbal reprimand by the referee)
- Warning
- Point deduction

Two identical cautions lead to one warning. Two warnings lead to a point deduction. Three point deductions in a single round can lead to disqualification. Fighters who intentionally commit a foul intentionally are disqualified.

== Tournaments ==
Combat Time R-1 is a professional tournament for mixed impact martial arts, during which the world's best fighters from many types of martial arts fight for the title R-1 World Champion. As a compilation of the most spectacular and complex rules, techniques and strikes. R-1 rules provide a high rating of each event. Fight regulations requires high athletic skills and experience in world level competitions.

== Champions ==
- Up to 71 kg: Parviz Abdullayev (Azerbaijan)
- Up to 81 kg: Alexander Lipovoy
- Up to 86 kg: Suleiman Magomedov (Russia)
- Up to 67 kg: Murad Sharifov

== Activities ==
In 2014, the Mixed Impact Martial Arts Federation R-1 in conjunction with the National Anti-drug Union of Russia, with the support of the Social Platform of All-Russian political party United Russia organized the 3rd International tournament in Mixed Impact Martial Arts among recovering young people "Honor and Freedom. Combat Time R-1". The participants had passed through rehabilitation. They stepped into the ring to prove that coping with drug addiction and returning to normal life are possible. After fights between former drug addicts, professional athletes come to the ring to show beautiful fights to support convalescents.

The 3rd International tournament in Mixed Impact Martial Arts among recovering young people "Honor and Freedom. Combat Time R-1" was held January 24, 2014 in Moscow. "Honor and Freedom. Combat Time R-1" received support from state and federal governments. The event was attended by celebrities and 3,000 spectators.
