= International Mixed Martial Arts Federation =

Sports governing body

- Abbreviation: IMMAF
- Formation: 29 February 2012; 14 years ago
- Type: Sports federation
- Purpose: Mixed martial arts sanctioning organization
- Headquarters: Grono
- Location: Switzerland
- Region served: Worldwide
- Members: 123
- President: Kerrith Brown
- Website: immaf.org

The International Mixed Martial Arts Federation (IMMAF) was founded on 29 February 2012 as the international governing body for amateur mixed martial arts (MMA). Registered as a non-profit organization under Swedish law, the IMMAF supports the growth of sport safety by aiding countries in the formation of federations. IMMAF launched with support of market leader, the Ultimate Fighting Championship (UFC). The UFC is among promotions under the IMMAF umbrella in countries that include Brazil and Sweden.

After the 2022 Russian invasion of Ukraine, the IMMAF suspended the memberships of the Russian MMA Union and the Federation of Hand-to-Hand Fighting & MMA of Belarus from participating in all IMMAF Championships, and banned the organization of IMMAF events in Russia and Belarus.

== Amateur vs. professional level athletes ==
The IMMAF considers an athlete to be on a professional level and thus not eligible for participation if he or she meets any one of the following criteria:

- Holds a Pro MMA or professional combat sports license issued by any sanctioning body
- Under contract with a professional MMA or professional combat sport promotion
- Has received a fee for participating in an MMA or professional combat sports match
- Participated in a professional MMA match under the Unified Rules of MMA or equivalent in the country where the bout took place
- Competed against an opponent with a Pro MMA record at the time the bout took place
- Professional MMA fight record published anywhere
- National amateur criteria do not hold for IMMAF international competition if it does not conform to the above stipulations

=== Compulsory equipment ===
- Gloves
- Shin guards
- Shorts made in a durable material and designed that they can't inflict injury
- Mouthpiece
- Competition top or rashguard (women only)
- Protective groin cup (optional for women, compulsory for men)
- Protective chest gear (optional for women, not applicable for men)
- Knee protection (optional)
- Ankle protection (optional)

=== Unauthorized techniques ===
The same from the Unified Rules of MMA plus:

- Elbow and forearm strikes of any kind
- Heel hook
- Twisters/sit through crucifix and/or any submission deemed as applying pressure to the spine
- Knees to the head at any point
- U18 competitions: any attacks (kicks, punches, elbows, knees) to the head

=== Length of the match ===
- A match shall contain three rounds
- A round shall last three minutes
- The round break shall last sixty seconds

=== Suspension ===
A contestant who was knocked out as a result of a blow to the head, or whose match was stopped by the judge, shall be suspended from competition and sparring matches.

Suspension periods starting from the day of the latest match:

- One knockout: minimum four weeks of suspension
- Two knockouts during a period of three months: minimum three months of suspension
- Three knockouts during a period of twelve months: minimum twelve months of suspension

== Members ==
National Federations:

=== Pan America ===
- Argentina - Argentine Association of Mixed Martial Arts and Contact Sports
- Aruba - Millard Academy
- Bahamas - Empire Mixed Martial Arts Bahamas
- Barbados - Barbados Mixed Martial Arts Federation (BMMAF)
- Belize - MMA Federation of Belize
- Bolivia - MMA Federation of Belize
- Brazil - Brazilian MMA Athletic Commission / Comissão Atlética Brasileira de MMA (CABMMA)
- Canada - Canadian Combat Alliance
- Cayman Islands - Under Review
- Colombia - Asociación Colombiana de Artes Marciales Mixtas (OCAMM)
- Costa Rica - Federacion de Artes Marciales Mixtas
- Dominican Republic - Federation Dominicana de Artes Marciale Mixtas
- Ecuador - Ecuador Mixed Martial Arts Federation (EMMAF)
- El Salvador - Federacion Salvadoreña de Kickboxing & MMA / Salvadorean Kickboxing & MMA Federation (presiding over Commission Salvadoreña de Artes Marciales Mixtas / Salvadorean Mixed Martial Arts Commission)
- Grenada - Grenada mixed martial arts federation
- Guatemala - Asociación Guatemalteca de Artes Marciales Mixtas
- Guyana - Guyana Mixed Martials Federation
- Jamaica - MMA Jamaica Sports Federation
- Mexico - Federación de Artes Marciales Mixtas Equidad y Juego Limpio (FAMMEJL)
- Panama - Asociación Nacional de mixed martial arts
- Paraguay - Federacion Paraguaya de Kick Boxing Muay Thai & MMA
- Puerto Rico - Federacion Independiente de Artes Marciales Mixtas de Puerto Rico (FIAMMPR)
- Saint Martin - Sint Maarten Martial Arts
- St Lucia - St Lucia Mixed Martial Arts Federation
- Trinidad and Tobago - Trinidad and Tobago Mixed Martial Arts Federation (TNT MMAF)
- Uruguay - Asociacion Uruguaya de Artes Marciales Mixtas Amateur y Profesional – AUAMMAP
- United States of America - USA Mixed Martial Arts Federation
- Venezuela - Federación Venezolana de Artes Marciales Mixtas (FEVAMM) National

=== Asia ===
- Afghanistan - Afghanistan MMA Federation (AMMAF)
- Bahrain - Bahrain Mixed Martial Arts Federation
- China - MMA Department Of Chinese Boxing Federation
- Hong Kong - Hong Kong MMA Federation Ltd
- India - MMA India
- Indonesia - Indonesia Committee for Martial Art Sports / Komite Olahraga Beladiri Indonesia – KOBI
- Iran - Iranian MMA Federation (IRMMAF)
- Iraq - Iraqi Mixed Martial Arts Federation (IQMMAF)
- Japan - Japan MMA Federation JMMAF
- Jordan - Jordan Mixed Martial Arts Federation
- Kazakhstan - Kazakh National Public Union of Mixed Martial Arts (MMA) Federation
- Kuwait - MMA Kuwait Association
- Kyrgyzstan - Republic Of Kyrgyzstan Federation Of MMA And Pankration
- Lebanon - Lebanese MMA Federation
- Malaysia - Malaysia Mixed Martial Arts Association (MASMMAA)
- Mongolia - Mongolian Mixed Martial Arts Federation
- Nepal - Nepal National Martial Art Games Confederation
- Pakistan - Mixed Martial Arts Pakistan (PAKMMA)
- Philippines - Philippines Mixed Martial Arts Federation
- Saudi Arabia - Saudi Mixed Martial Arts Federation
- Singapore - Under Review
- South Korea - Under Review
- Sri Lanka - Mixed Martial Arts Federation Sri Lanka
- Taiwan - Chinese Taipei Mixed Martial Arts Association
- Tajikistan - Federation Of Mixed Martial Arts Of The Republic Of Tajikistan
- Thailand - Thai Mixed Martial Arts Federation (TMMAF)
- United Arab Emirates - UAE Jiu-Jitsu and Mixed Martial Arts Federation
- Uzbekistan - Uzbekistan MMA Association
- Vietnam - Vietnam MMA Federation

=== Europe ===
- Albania - Albanian Mixed Martial Arts Federation
- Armenia - MMA Federation of Armenia
- Austria - Austrian Mixed Martial Arts Federation
- Azerbaijan - Azerbaijan Mixed Martial Arts Federation
- Belgium - Belgian Mixed Martial Arts Federation
- Bulgaria - Bulgarian Mixed Martial Arts Federation (BULMMAF)
- Croatia - Croatian Mixed Martial Arts Union (HMMAU)
- Cyprus - Cyprus Mixed Martial Arts Federation (CMMAF)
- Czech Republic - Czech Association of MMA
- Denmark - Danish Mixed Martial Arts Federation
- England - England Mixed Martial Arts Association
- Estonia - Estonian Mixed Martial Arts Federation
- Finland - Finnish Mixed Martial Arts Federation / Suomen Vapaaotteluliitto ry
- France - French Mixed Martial Arts Federation (FMMAF)
- Georgia - National Federation of Universal Martial Arts
- Germany - German Mixed Martial Arts Federation (GEMMAF)
- Greece - Panhellenic MMA Federation
- Hungary - Hungarian MMA Federation (HMMAF)
- Iceland - Iceland MMA Federation
- Ireland - Irish Mixed Martial Arts Association (IMMAA)
- Israel- ISR Mixed Martial Arts
- Italy - Federazione Italiana Grappling Mixed Martial Arts / Italian Grappling and Mixed Martial Arts Federation (FIGMMA)
- Kosovo - Kosovo Miksed Martial Arts Federation / Federation Federata Arteve Mikse Marciale
- Latvia - Under Review
- Lithuania - Lithuanian Mixed Martial Arts Federation
- Luxembourg - Fédération Luxembourgeoise de MMA (FLMMA)
- Malta - Malta Mixed Martial Arts Association
- Moldova - Moldovan MMA Federation
- Netherlands - MMA Union Netherlands
- Northern Ireland - Ulster Amateur MMA
- Norway - Norwegian Mixed Martial Arts Federation
- Poland - Stowarzyszenie MMA Polska
- Portugal - Federação Portugusea de Lutas Amadoras (FPLA) / Comissão Atlética Portuguesa de MMA (CAPMMA)
- Romania - Romanian Kempo Mixed Martial Arts Federation (RKMMAF)
- Russia - Russian MMA Union (suspended)
- Scotland - Mixed Martial Arts Federation Of Scotland
- Serbia - Serbian MMA Federation
- Slovakia - Slovak MMA Association
- Slovenia - Slovenia MMA Federation
- Spain - Federación Española de Lucha Olímpica y Disciplinas Asociadas (FELUCHA-IMMAF)
- Sweden - Swedish Mixed Martial Arts Federation
- Switzerland - Federation Switzerland Mixed Martial Arts
- Turkey - Turkey Combat Mixed Martial Arts Sport Association
- Ukraine - MMA League of Ukraine
- Wales - Mixed Martial Arts Cymru

=== Oceania ===
- Australia - International Mixed Martial Arts Federation of Australia
- French Polynesia - Wrestling Polynesian Federation & Associated Disciplines
- New Zealand - New Zealand Mixed Martial Arts Federation

=== Africa ===
- Algeria - Algerian Federation of Kickboxing, MMA & Similar Sports
- Angola - Associação Provincial de MMA de Luanda
- Cameroon - National League Mixed Martial Arts Cameroon (NLMMAC)
- Cote D Ivoire - Federation Ivoirienne D Arts Martiaux Mixtes
- Democratic Republic of Congo - Democratic Republic of Congo MMA Federation (DRCMMAF)
- Egypt - The Egyptian MMA Committee
- Ghana - Ghana Mixed Martial Arts Federation (GHAMMAF)
- Guinea - Guinean Federation of Krav-Maga and Associated Disciplines (MMA)
- Mauritius - Mixed Martial Arts Federation Mauritius
- Morocco - Fédération Royale Marocaine Du Sport de Combat Libre Et Mixte (FRMSCLM)
- Namibia - Namibian MMA Federation
- Nigeria - Nigerian Mixed Martial Arts Federation
- Senegal - MMA Senegal
- The Seychelles - The Seychelles Mixed Martial Arts Association
- South Africa - Mixed Martial Arts South Africa (MMASA)
- Tunisia - Tunisian Mixed Martial Arts Federation
- Zambia - Mixed Martial Arts Zambia
- Zimbabwe - Mixed Martial Arts Association (ZMMMA)

== Partnership with BRAVE Combat Federation ==
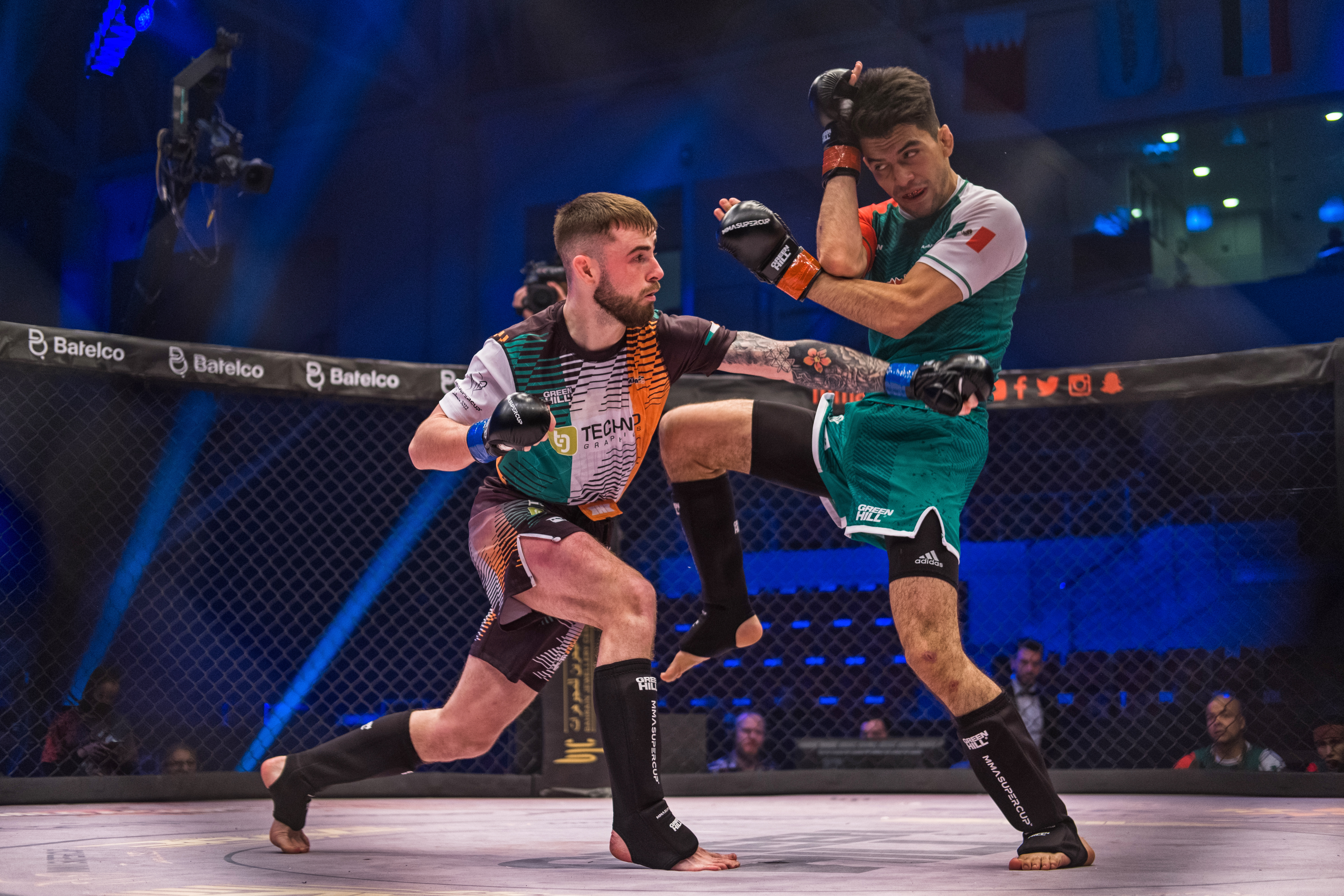
Ireland vs. Mexico at IMMAF World Championships held in the Kingdom of Bahrain

Since 2017, the IMMAF has partnered with the Brave Combat Federation to host world championships outside the USA. As a result, Bahrain became the second nation to host IMMAF World Championships in 2017, 2018, and 2019. Subsequently, the IMMAF partnered with the organization to host the 2021 IMMAF World Cup and 2022 MMA Super Cup. Further, the organization hosted the IMMAF World Championships Week from February 10–18, 2023 in Belgrade.

== Championships ==
=== World Championships ===
- 2014 IMMAF World Championships
- 2015 IMMAF World Championships
- 2016 IMMAF World Championships
- 2017 IMMAF World Championships
- 2018 IMMAF World Championships
- 2019 IMMAF World Championships
- 2021 IMMAF World Championships
- 2022 IMMAF World Championships
- 2023 IMMAF World Championships

=== Youth World Championships ===
- 2019 IMMAF Youth World Championships
- 2021 IMMAF Youth World Championships
- 2022 IMMAF Youth World Championships
- 2023 IMMAF Youth World Championships

=== Junior World Championships ===
- 2019 IMMAF Junior World Championships
- 2020 IMMAF Junior World Championships
- 2021 IMMAF Junior World Championships
- 2022 IMMAF Junior World Championships
- 2023 IMMAF Junior World Championships
- 2024 IMMAF Junior World Championships

=== World Cup ===
- 2021 IMMAF World Cup

=== Super Cup ===
- 2022 MMA Super Cup

=== European Championships ===
- 2015 IMMAF European Open Championship
- 2016 IMMAF European Open Championships
- 2017 IMMAF European Open Championships
- 2018 IMMAF European Open Championships
- 2019 IMMAF European Open Championships
- 2021 IMMAF European Open Championships
- 2022 IMMAF European Open Championships
- 2023 IMMAF European Open Championships

=== African Championships ===
- 2016 IMMAF Africa Open Championships
- 2017 IMMAF Africa Open Championships
- 2018 IMMAF Africa Open Championships
- 2019 IMMAF Africa Open Championships
- 2022 IMMAF Africa Open Championships
- 2023 IMMAF Africa Open Championships

=== Asian Championships ===
- 2017 IMMAF Asian Open Championships
- 2019 IMMAF Asian Open Championships
- 2022 IMMAF Asian Open Championships
- 2023 IMMAF Asian Open Championships

=== Oceanian Championships ===
- 2018 IMMAF Oceania Open Championships
- 2019 IMMAF Oceania Open Championships
- 2020 IMMAF Oceania Open Championships

=== Pan American Championships ===
- 2019 Pan American Open Championships
- 2022 Pan American Open Championships
- 2023 Pan American Open Championships

== Medals (world championships) ==
Totals do not include medals from the 2016 or 2017 World Championships.

Ranking	Country	Gold (gold)	Silver (silver)	Bronze (bronze)
1	United States	6	1	7
2	(United Kingdom) Great Britain	1	2	7
3	Sweden	0	7	2
4	Italy	1	0	6
5	Finland	3	1	1
6	Canada	2	1	2
7	Poland	1	1	3
8	Norway	0	3	1
9	France	0	1	3
10	South Africa	2	0	1
11	(Republic of Ireland) Ireland	1	1	1
12	New Zealand	0	0	3
13	Denmark	2	0	0
14	Czech Republic	1	0	1
14	Germany	1	0	1
16	Kazakhstan	0	2	0
17	Lebanon	0	1	1
17	Romania	0	1	1
17	Ukraine	0	1	1
20	Belgium	0	0	2
21	Austria	1	0	0
21	Brazil	1	0	0
