= 2009 M-1 Challenge season =

Mixed martial arts events

- League: M-1 Global
- Sport: Mixed Martial Arts
- Duration: February 21, 2009 – December 3, 2009

M-1 Challenge seasons
- ← 2008 2010 →

The 2009 M-1 Challenge season was the second season of the M-1 Challenge series presented by M-1 Global. It started on February 21, 2009 and concluded on December 3, 2009. 16 teams from around the world competed in the 2009 M-1 Challenge Season, up from the 9 teams that competed in 2008. The teams typically featured top MMA prospects. The Season was won by the Russian Legion team.

== Background ==
M-1 Challenge is a team-based competition organized with a series of events held in different places around the world where MMA clubs compete against each other. The teams consist of five fighters, one in each of the five major MMA weight classes- Lightweight, Welterweight, Middleweight, Light Heavyweight and Heavyweight.

== Team Results ==
=== Group Stage Standings ===
Group A	team record	overall record
x- England	2-1	10-5
Japan	2-1	8-7
France	1-2	8-7
Spain	1-2	4-11
Group B	team record	overall record
x- (United States) USA West	3-0	13-2
Brazil	2-1	10-5
South Korea	1-2	5-10
(Russia) Imperial Team	0-3	2-13
Group C	team record	overall record
x- (United States) USA East	2-1	10-5
Finland	2-1	10-5
Benelux	1-2	6-9
Bulgaria	1-2	4-11
Group D	team record	overall record
x- (Russia) Russian Legion	3-0	13-2
Germany	2-1	10-5
World Team	1-2	6-9
Turkey	0-3	1-14

x-clinched group title and semifinal playoff berth

=== Semi-finals ===
(United States) USA East defeats (United States) USA West (4-1)

(Russia) Russian Legion defeats United Kingdom (4-1)

=== Finals ===
(Russia) Russian Legion defeats (United States) USA East to claim the second M-1 Challenge (5-0)

== Season Results ==
21 February 2009 (Seattle, USA) Sang Soo Lee

Finland vs. Benelux (4-1)

- Lightweight bout: (Belgium) Danny van Bergen defeats (Finland) Juha-Pekka Vainikainen via unanimous decision.
- Welterweight bout: (Finland) Janne Tulirinta defeats (Belgium) Tommy Depret via submission (D'arce choke) at 2:30 of Round 1.
- Middleweight bout: (Finland) Lucio Linhares defeats (Netherlands) Kamil Uygun via submission (armbar) at 1:22 of Round 1.
- Light Heavyweight bout: (Finland) Marcus Vänttinen defeats (Netherlands) Jason Jones by unanimous decision.
- Heavyweight bout: (Finland) Toni Valtonen defeats (Netherlands) Sander Duyvis via TKO (punches) at 0:18 of Round 1.

South Korea vs. (Russia) The Imperial Team (3-2)

- Lightweight bout: (South Korea) Do Hyung Kim defeats (Russia) Mikhail Malyutin via unanimous decision.
- Welterweight bout: (South Korea) Myung Ho Bae defeats (Russia) Erik Oganov via submission (rear naked choke) at 2:12 of Round 2.
- Middleweight bout: (Russia) Dmitri Samoylov defeats (South Korea) Hyun Gyu Lim via unanimous decision.
- Light Heavyweight bout: (South Korea) Jae Young Kim defeats (Russia) Mikhail Zayats via TKO (head kick) at 4:02 of Round 2.
- Heavyweight bout: (Russia) Alexey Oleinik defeats (South Korea) Sang Soo Lee via submission (ezekiel choke) at 4:27 of Round 2.

(United States) USA West vs. Brazil (3-2)

- Lightweight bout: (United States) Dave Jansen defeats (Brazil) Flavio Roberto Alvaro via unanimous decision.
- Welterweight bout: (Brazil) Eduardo Pamplona defeats (United States) Dylan Clay via TKO (punches) at 2:48 of Round 3.
- Middleweight bout: (United States) Reggie Orr defeats (Brazil) Juliano Cioffi Belgine via split decision.
- Light Heavyweight bout: (United States) Raphael Davis defeats (Brazil) Jair Goncalves Junior via TKO (punches) at 4:05 of Round 1.
- Heavyweight bout: (Brazil) Jose Edson dos Santos Franca defeats (United States) Carl Seumanutafa via split decision.

28 March 2009 (Bourgas, Bulgaria)

(United States) USA East vs. Bulgaria (5-0)

- Lightweight bout: (Brazil) Renato Migliaccio defeats (Bulgaria) Yanko Yanev via submission (armbar) at 4:45 of Round 1.
- Welterweight bout: (United States) Steve Carl defeats (Bulgaria) Ivan Ivanov via submission (rear naked choke) at 3:31 of Round 1.
- Middleweight bout: (United States) Herbert Goodman defeats (Bulgaria) Jordan Radev via knockout at 4:59 of Round 2.
- Light Heavyweight bout: (United States) Chuck Grigsby defeats (Bulgaria) Atanas Dzhambazov via unanimous decision.
- Heavyweight bout: (United States) Lloyd Marshbanks defeats (Bulgaria) Emil Samoilov via submission (heel hook) at 3:27 of Round 1.

Germany vs. Turkey (5-0)

- Lightweight bout: (Germany) Franco de Leonardis defeats (Turkey) Akin Duran via submission (triangle choke) at 2:29 of Round 1.
- Welterweight bout: (Germany) Daniel Weichel defeats (Turkey) Fatih Dogan via submission (d'arce choke) at 2:29 of Round 1.
- Middleweight bout: (Germany) Gregor Herb defeats (Turkey) Ahmed Bayrak via submission (rear naked choke) at 2:00 of Round 2.
- Light Heavyweight bout: (Germany) Martin Zawada defeats (Turkey) Samy Turky via TKO at 2:38 of Round 1.
- Heavyweight bout: (Germany) David Baziak defeats (Turkey) Tugrul Okay via TKO at 0:52 of Round 2.

(Russia) Legion Sport Club vs. World Team (4-1)

- Lightweight bout: (Russia) Yuri Ivlev defeats (Netherlands) Romano de los Reyes via unanimous decision.
- Welterweight bout: (Russia) Magomed Shikhshabekov defeats (Germany) Jason Ponet via submission (triangle choke) at 1:34 of Round 1.
- Middleweight bout: (Russia) Sergey Kornev defeats (Netherlands) Nathan Schouteren via KO at 0:12 of Round 1.
- Light Heavyweight bout: (Russia) Gadzhimurad Omarov defeats (Netherlands) Nils van Noord via submission (rear naked choke) at 2:24 of Round 1.
- Heavyweight bout: (Poland) Michal Kita defeats (Russia) Ahmed Sultanov via KO at 2:30 of Round 1.

29 April 2009 (Tokyo, Japan)

England vs. Japan (4-1)

- Lightweight bout: (Brazil) Luiz Andrade defeats (England) Ian Butlin via submission (armbar) at 3:20 of Round 1.
- Welterweight bout: (England) Simon Phillips defeats (Japan) Hidehiko Hasegawa via KO at 0:20 of Round 1.
- Middleweight bout: (England) Matt Thorpe defeats (Japan) Yusuke Masuda via submission (rear naked choke) at 1:30 of Round 2.
- Lightheavyweight bout: (England) Tom Blackledge defeats (Japan) Tatsuya Mizuno via submission (rear naked choke) at 3:22 of Round 1.
- Heavyweight bout: (England) Rob Broughton defeats (Japan) Yusuke Kawaguchi via unanimous decision.

Spain vs. France (3-2)

- Lightweight bout: (Spain) Jose Luis Zapater defeats (France) Makhtar Gueye via disqualification (illegal kick) at 1:21 of Round 3.
- Welterweight bout: (Spain) Abner Lloveras defeats (France) Gael Grimaud via split decision.
- Middleweight bout: (France) Christophe Dafreville defeats (Spain) Rayco Silva via submission (Anaconda choke) at 2:48 of Round 1.
- Lightheavyweight bout: (France) Christian M'Pumbu defeats (Spain) Enoc Solves via submission (armbar) at 4:59 of Round 1.
- Heavyweight bout: (Spain) Rogent Lloret defeats (France) Soufian Elgarne via submission (anaconda choke) at 2:44 of Round 1.

(United States) USA West vs. South Korea (5-0)

- Lightweight bout: (United States) Dave Jansen defeats (South Korea) Yui Chul Nam via unanimous decision.
- Welterweight bout: (Brazil) Fábio Nascimento defeats (South Korea) Myung Ho Bae via majority decision.
- Middleweight bout: (Brazil) Givanildo Santana defeats (South Korea) Min Suk Heo via submission (armbar) at 4:05 of Round 1.
- Lightheavyweight bout: (United States) Raphael Davis defeats (South Korea) Jae Young Kim via TKO (punches) at 3:45 of Round 2.
- Heavyweight bout: (United States) Shane Del Rosario defeats (South Korea) Dool Hee Lee via KO (head kick) at 2:27 of Round 1.

9 May 2009 (São Paulo, Brazil)

Bulgaria vs. Benelux (3-2)

- Lightweight bout: (Bulgaria) Yanko Yanev defeats (Belgium) Danny van Bergen via submission (armbar) at 2:23 of Round 1.
- Welterweight bout: (Netherlands) Raymond Jarman defeats (Bulgaria) Ivan Ivanov via TKO (flying knee) at 0:35 of Round 1.
- Middleweight bout: (Bulgaria) Jordan Radev defeats (Netherlands) Danny Smit via unanimous decision.
- Lightheavyweight bout: (Bulgaria) Emil Samoilov defeats (Netherlands) Jason Jones via TKO (doctor’s stoppage) at 2:09 of Round 1.
- Heavyweight bout: (Netherlands) Jessie Gibbs defeats (Bulgaria) Nikola Dipchkov via submission (strikes) at 1:37 of Round 1.

(Russia) Legion Sport Club vs. Germany (4-1)

- Lightweight bout: (Russia) Yura Ivlev defeats (Germany) Franco de Leonardis via TKO (strikes) at 2:14 of Round 2.
- Welterweight bout: (Russia) Magomed Shikhshabekov defeats (Germany) Sven Heising via knockout (strikes) at 4:27 of Round 1.
- Middleweight bout: (Germany) Gregor Herb defeats (Russia) Sergey Kornev via submission (armbar) at 4:32 of Round 1.
- Lightheavyweight bout: (Russia) Gadzimurad Omarov defeats (Germany) Ismail Centinkaya via submission (strikes) at 1:09 of Round 1.
- Heavyweight bout: (Russia) Akhmed Sultanov defeats (Germany) Lars Klug via submission (armbar) at 1:21 of Round 1.

Brazil vs. (Russia) The Imperial Team (5-0)

- Lightweight bout: (Brazil) Hacran Dias defeats (Russia) Amirkhan Mazikhov via submission (rear naked choke) at 3:58 of Round 1.
- Welterweight bout: (Brazil) Eduardo Pamplona defeats (Russia) Erik Oganov via majority decision.
- Middleweight bout: (Brazil) Leandro Silva defeats (Russia) Dmitri Samoylov via unanimous decision.
- Lightheavyweight bout: (Brazil) Alexander Machado defeats (Russia) Mikhail Zayats via unanimous decision.
- Heavyweight bout: (Brazil) Joaquim Ferreira defeats (Russia) Maxim Grishin via submission (North/South Choke) at 3:57 of Round 1.

5 June 2009 (Kansas City, USA)

World Team vs. Turkey (4-1)

- Lightweight bout: (Turkey) Akin Duran defeats (Netherlands) Romano De Los Reyes via TKO (strikes) at 1:57 of Round 3.
- Welterweight bout: (Sweden) Diego Gonzalez defeats (Turkey) Fatih Dogan via TKO (strikes) at 2:16 of Round 1.
- Middleweight bout: (Netherlands) Nathan Schouteren defeats (Turkey) Ahmed Bayrak via TKO (strikes) at 3:21 of Round 1.
- Light Heavyweight bout: (United States) Ryan Sturdy defeats (Turkey) John Doyle via majority decision.
- Heavyweight bout: (Poland) Michał Kita defeats (Turkey) Liron Wilson via TKO (strikes) at 3:27 of Round 1.

France vs. England (4-1)

- Lightweight bout: (France) Makhtar Gueye defeats (England) Ian Butlin via TKO (strikes) at 0:09 of Round 1.
- Welterweight bout: (France) Gael Grimaud defeats (England) Simon Phillips via submission (triangle) 1:29 of Round 1.
- Middleweight bout: (France) Christophe Dafreville defeats (England) Matt Thorpe via submission (triangle) at 4:32 of Round 1.
- Light Heavyweight bout: (France) Johan Romming defeats (England) Danny Giblin via submission (North/South choke) at 1:59 of Round 1.
- Heavyweight bout: (England) Rob Broughton defeats (France) Soufian Elgarne via corner stoppage (injury) at 2:02 of Round 1.

(United States) USA East vs. Finland (3-2)

- Lightweight bout: (Brazil) Renato Migliaccio defeats (Finland) Niko Puhakka via submission (armbar) at 4:18 of Round 1.
- Welterweight bout: (Finland) Janne Tulirinta defeats (United States) Anthony Ford via TKO (strikes) at 0:11 of Round 1.
- Middleweight bout: (Brazil) Lucio Linhares defeats (Brazil) Valdir Araujo via knockout at 1:25 of Round 1.
- Light Heavyweight bout: (United States) Rodney Wallace defeats (Finland) Marcus Vänttinen via unanimous decision.
- Heavyweight bout: (United States) Lloyd Marshbanks defeats (Finland) Toni Valtonen via submission (neck crank/side headlock) at 0:55 of Round 2.

4 July 2009 (Seoul, South Korea)

Finland vs. Bulgaria (4-1)

- Lightweight bout: (Finland) Niko Puhakka defeats (Bulgaria) Yanko Yanev via TKO (strikes) at 2:16 of Round 1.
- Welterweight bout: (Finland) Janne Tulirinta defeats (Bulgaria) Ivan Ivanov via TKO (strikes) at 3:44 of Round 1.
- Middleweight bout: (Bulgaria) Rosen Dimitrov defeats (Finland) Mikko Suvanto via majority decision.
- Light Heavyweight bout: (Finland) Marcus Vänttinen defeats (Bulgaria) Emil Samoilov via submission (verbal) at 3:42 of Round 3.
- Heavyweight bout: (Finland) Toni Valtonen defeats (Bulgaria) Nikola Dipchkov via submission (triangle) at 4:49 of Round 1.

(United States) USA West vs. (Russia) The Imperial Team (5-0)

- Lightweight bout: (United States) Dave Jansen defeats (Russia) Amirkhan Mazikhov via submission (guillotine) at 0:22 of Round 1.
- Welterweight bout: (Brazil) Fábio Nascimento defeats (Russia) Marat Ilaev via submission (armbar) at 2:13 of Round 2.
- Middleweight bout: (Brazil) Givanildo Santana defeats (Russia) Radmir Gabdulin via submission (arm triangle) at 3:47 of Round 1.
- Light Heavyweight bout: (United States) Tony Lopez defeats (Russia) Viktor Nemkov via submission (rear naked choke) at 3:06 of Round 2.
- Heavyweight bout: (United States) Shane Del Rosario defeats (Russia) Maksim Grishin via TKO (strikes) at 0:21 of Round 1.

Brazil vs. South Korea (3-2)

- Lightweight bout: (South Korea) Nam Yui Chul defeats (Brazil) Hacran Dias via unanimous decision.
- Welterweight bout: (Brazil) Eduardo Pamplona defeats (South Korea) Do Hyung Kim via unanimous decision.
- Middleweight bout: (Brazil) Daniel Acacio defeats (South Korea) Jae Young Kim via majority decision.
- Light Heavyweight bout: (Brazil) Alexander Machado defeats (South Korea) Dool Hee Lee via submission (rear naked choke) at 3:26 of Round 2.
- Heavyweight bout: (South Korea) Hae Joon Yang defeats (Brazil) Joaquim Ferreira def. via knockout at 0:14 of Round 1.

15 August 2009 (Amsterdam, the Netherlands)

England vs. Spain (5-0)

- Lightweight bout: (England) Scott Hewitt defeats (Spain) Jose Roque via submission (armbar) at 1:35 of Round 2.
- Welterweight bout: (England) Simon Phillips defeats (Spain) Jonathan Leon via submission (rear naked choke) at 4:29 of Round 1.
- Middleweight bout: (England) Matt Thorpe defeats (Spain) Rafael Rodriguez via submission (triangle) at 0:56 of Round 1.
- Light Heavyweight bout: (England) Tom Blackledge defeats (Spain) Enoc Solves via KO (head kick) at 0:09 of Round 1.
- Heavyweight bout: (England) David Keeley defeats (Spain) Paco Estevez via TKO (strikes) at 4:23 of Round 2.

Japan vs. France (3-2)

- Lightweight bout: (Japan) Yoshiro Tomioka defeats (France) Frederic Fernandez via submission (triangle) at 3:53 Round 1.
- Welterweight bout: (Japan) Yuya Shirai defeats (France) Gael Grimaud via TKO (strikes) at 4:16 of Round 1.
- Middleweight bout: (France) Christophe Dafreville defeats (Japan) Yusuke Masuda via submission (armbar) at 2:27 of Round 1.
- Light Heavyweight bout: (France) Christian M'Pumbu defeats (Japan) Hideto Tatsumi via TKO (strikes) at 4:53 of Round 2.
- Heavyweight bout: (Japan) Yoshiyuki Nakanishi defeats (France) Akim Assenine via submission (Achilles lock) at 4:51 of Round 1.

Germany vs. World Team (4-1)

- Lightweight bout: (Germany) Daniel Weichel defeats (Netherlands) Danial Sharifi via submission (guillotine) at 2:53 of Round 2.
- Welterweight bout: (Sweden) Diego Gonzalez* defeats (Germany) Nordin Asrih via unanimous decision.
- Middleweight bout: (Netherlands) Nathan Schouteren defeats (Germany) Ismael Cetinkaya via TKO (strikes) at 3:51 of Round 1.
- Light Heavyweight bout: (Germany) Mathias Schuck defeats (France) Johan Romming via unanimous decision.
- Heavyweight bout: Thorsten Kronz defeats (Serbia) Miodrag Petkovic via TKO (doctor’s stoppage) at 3:08 of Round 2.
  - Despite winning the individual bout, Gonzales’ victory over Asrih was not valid as Gonzales failed to make weight within the M-1 Challenge designated time limit. Per M-1 Challenge rules, the fight was ruled a forfeit in Germany’s favor as it relates to the M-1 Challenge standings.

16 August 2009 (Amsterdam, the Netherlands)

Japan vs. Spain (4-1)

- Lightweight bout: (Spain) Abner Lloveras defeats (Brazil) Luiz Andrade via unanimous decision.
- Welterweight bout: (Japan) Hidehiko Hasegawa defeats (Spain) Jose Bertran via unanimous decision.
- Middleweight bout: (Japan) Rikuhei Fujii defeats (Spain) Rayco Kakin via unanimous decision.
- Light Heavyweight bout: (Japan) Tatsuya Mizuno defeats (Spain) Rafael Rodriguez via submission (rear naked choke) at 2:20 of Round 1.
- Heavyweight bout: (Japan) Yusuke Kawaguchi defeats (Spain) Cirio Tejera via unanimous decision.

(Russia) Legion Sport Club vs. Turkey (5-0)

- Lightweight bout: (Russia) Rustam Khabilov defeats (Turkey) Akin Duran via knockout (slam) at 0:28 of Round 1.
- Welterweight bout: (Russia) Magomed Shikhshabekov defeats (Turkey) Fatih Dogan via TKO (strikes) at 0:35 of Round 1.
- Middleweight bout: (Russia) Sergey Kornev defeats (Turkey) Ahmed Bayrak via submission (neck crank) at 1:04 of Round 2.
- Light Heavyweight bout: (Russia) Besiki Gerenava defeats (Turkey) Abdullah Ahmady via submission (rear naked choke) at 3:51 of Round 2.
- Heavyweight bout: (Russia) Akhmed Sultanov defeats (Turkey) Gurhan Degirmenci via submission (triangle) at 1:07 of Round 1.

Benelux vs. (United States) USA East (3-2)

- Lightweight bout: (Belgium) Danny van Bergen defeats (United States) David Zitnik via TKO (strikes) at 2:07 of Round 1.
- Welterweight bout: (United States) Shamar Bailey defeats (Netherlands) Raymond Jarman via TKO (strikes) at 3:15 of Round 2.
- Middleweight bout: (United States) John Doyle defeats (Netherlands) Richard Plug via unanimous decision.
- Light Heavyweight bout: (Netherlands) Jason Jones defeats (United States) Mike Connors via submission (strikes) at 1:00 of Round 1.
- Heavyweight bout: (Netherlands) Jessie Gibbs defeats (United States) Charles Grigsby via unanimous decision.

== Final round ==
Semi-Finals

26 September 2009 (Rostov-on-Don, Russia)

(United States) USA East vs. (United States) USA West (4-1)

- Lightweight bout: (Brazil) Ivan Jorge defeats (United States) Steve Magdaleno via unanimous decision.
- Welterweight bout: (Brazil) Delson Heleno defeats (Brazil) Fabio Nascimento via unanimous decision.
- Middleweight bout: (Brazil) Gerson Dos Santos defeats (Brazil) Joao Asis via TKO (strikes) at 3:50 of Round 1.
- Light Heavyweight bout: (United States) Chuck Grigsby defeats (United States) Spencer Hooker via unanimous decision.
- Heavyweight bout: (United States) Shane Del Rosario defeats (United States) Lloyd Marshbanks via TKO at 1:34 of Round 1.

(Russia) Russian Legion vs. England(4-1)

- Lightweight bout: (Russia) Yuri Ivlev defeats (England) Scott Hewitt via TKO (strikes) at 0:54 of Round 1.
- Welterweight bout: (Russia) Magomed Shikhshabekov defeats (England) Simon Phillips via submission (reverse heel hook) at 0:15 of Round 1.
- Middleweight bout: (Russia) Ansar Chalangov defeats (England) Matt Thorpe via submission (reverse heel hook) at 0:41 of Round 1.
- Light Heavyweight bout: (Russia) Besiki Gerenava defeats (England) Lee Austin via unanimous decision.
- Heavyweight bout: (England) Rob Broughton defeats (Russia) Akhmed Sultanov via submission (keylock) at 4:31 of Round 1.

Finals

3 December 2009 (St. Petersburg, Russia)

(Russia) Russian Legion vs. (United States) USA East (5-0)

- Lightweight bout: (Russia) Yura Ivlev defeats (Brazil) Ivan Jorge via TKO (strikes) at 4:11 of Round 2.
- Welterweight bout: (Russia) Magomed Shikhshabekov defeats (Brazil) Gerson Dos Santos via submission (armbar) at 2:06 of Round 1.
- Middleweight bout: (Russia) Ansar Chalangov defeats (Brazil) Danilo Pereira via submission (heel hook) at 4:17 of Round 1.
- Light Heavyweight bout: (Russia) Besiki Gerenava defeats (United States) Chuck Grigsby via split decision.
- Heavyweight bout: (Russia) Gadzhimurad Omarov defeats (United States) Lloyd Marshbanks via corner stoppage at 4:07 of Round 3.
