= 2010 M-1 Challenge season =

Mixed martial arts events

- League: M-1 Global
- Sport: Mixed Martial Arts
- Duration: February 5, 2009 – December 10, 2009

M-1 Challenge seasons
- ← 2009 2011 →

The 2010 M-1 Challenge season was the third season of mixed martial arts (MMA) fighting presented by the M-1 Global promotion. The season started on February 5 and will conclude with the M-1 Challenge XXII event on December 10. Unlike in previous years where competition was arranged entirely around country-based teams, the 2010 competition had a greater focus on individual achievement. Rather than the sixteen "country" teams of the 2009 competition, the 2010 M-1 Challenge featured eight teams representing four "continents" – Europe, Russia, Americas and Asia – with each continent having two teams. Four of the teams are drawn from the M-1 Selection events whilst the other four are selected from, and featured, veteran MMA fighters. Events held near the end of the year featured bouts to crown inaugural M-1 Global Champions in each of the five weight divisions.

== Background ==
M-1 Challenge is a team-based competition organized with a series of events held around the world wherever MMA clubs compete. Each team consist of five fighters, one from each of the five major MMA weight classes: lightweight, welterweight, middleweight, light heavyweight and heavyweight. The inaugural Challenge (the 2008 Season) was won by the Russian team from the Red Devil Sport Club, who defeated the team from the Netherlands. The 2009 M-1 Challenge Season was also won by a Russian team, this time with a 5–0 defeat of the USA East team.

== M-1 Challenge XXI: Guram vs. Garner ==
The first M-1 Challenge event took place on October 28, 2010, at the Ice Palace in St. Petersburg, Russia. The event featured two title bouts that paired M-1 Global's 2010 "Selection" regional champions, who topped a worldwide tournament that began in January.

=== Championship bouts ===
Belarusian Artiom Damkovsky and his Russian opponent Mairbek Taisumov fought to determine the Championship in the lightweight division. Damkovsky came into the bout as the M-1 Eastern European Lightweight Champion, having twice defeated Arsen Ubaidulaev and with an overall 7–4 win–loss record. Taisumov became the M-1 Western European Lightweight Champion when he defeated Serhiy Adamchuk and entered the championship bout with a 12–2 record. Both Damkovsky and Taisumov were undefeated in the 2010 Season prior to their fight. In the first two rounds, the two men were relatively evenly matched: Damkovsky was the more powerful striker, landing telling blows with low and mid-kicks. Taisumov, however, executed a successful takedown in the second round and followed it up with a crushing ground-and-pound. In the third round, both men remained on their feet until the bout was stopped when Damkovsky poked Taisumov in the eye. Though medically cleared to continue, Taisumov declined to continue and Damkovsky was declared the winner with a TKO by retirement.

The two fighters meeting in the heavyweight championship bout were Ukrainian Guram Gugenishvili and American Kenny Garner. Gugenishvili became the M-1 Western European Heavyweight champion when he defeated fellow-Ukrainian Alexander Romaschenko in a bout held at the M-1 Selection Eastern European finals Gugenishvili's victory by rear naked choke submission took his win–loss record to 9–0, and eight of those victories were by submission. It was announced that Gugenishvili would face M-1 Eastern European Heavyweight Champion Maxim Grishin. However, Grishin was forced to withdraw from the bout with a knee injury that occurred during a national hand-to-hand combat fighting championship in Ufa, providing M-1 Global Americas Champion Kenny Garner the opportunity to fight Gugenishvili. Garner came into the championship bout with a 5–2 record, though he was undefeated in the preliminary rounds of the M-1 Challenge Season. The first round of the bout was evenly matched, with both Garner and Gugenishvili scrambling out from each other multiple times. Gugenishvili took control in the second round, however, when he took advantage of a clinch to put Garner into a guillotine choke hold. Gugenishvili achieved a technical submission victory as Garner lost consciousness, extending his undefeated run and making him the M-1 Global Heavyweight Champion.

=== Non-championship bouts ===
In addition to the title bouts, there were undercard bouts in all five weight divisions. Alexander Sarnavskiy, a previous M-1 Selection tournament participant, faced off against Victor Kuku, who was undefeated in M-1 competition. Sarnavskiy was previously scheduled to compete in the M-1 Eastern Europe final, but was forced to withdraw through illness. The fight did not last long as Sarnavskiy charged at Kuku, hitting him with a spinning back fist, before hitting him with a barrage of punches to force the stoppage at just 14 seconds.

Magomed Shikhshabekov also competed, against the former The Ultimate Fighter 9 participant Che Mills. Coming into the bout, Shikhshabekov was undefeated and had previously been scheduled to join Strikeforce, though visa issues forced him out. Che Mills was also riding a two-fight win streak, which included a nine-second knockout of Manuel Garcia. The fight, intended to be a welterweight battle, became a catchweight after Mills weighed in at 172 lb, 1 lb over the weight limit, meaning that Mills carried a point deduction into the fight. Sherdog scored the bout 29–26 for Mills, taking into account his point deduction, but the judges scored the bout as a draw. A deciding fourth round was therefore added, which Mills won easily, handing Shikshabekov his first professional loss.

Also on the card was a lightweight bout between Daniel Weichel and Yuri Ivlev and a welterweight bout between Igor Araujo and Rashid Magomedov. The former saw Weichel score an upset when his knees opened up a cut on Ivlev's head. Upon medical examination of the cut, the bout was waved off and Weichel was declared the winner via TKO. The bout between Araujo and Magomedov saw Magomedov coast to a decision victory, only being troubled in the second round with a submission attempt by Araujo.

=== Results summary ===
Match	Weight class	Winner weight at weigh-in	Loser weight at weigh-in	Method	Round	Time	Notes
1	Lightweight	(Azerbaijan) Vusal Bairamov; 153.75 pounds (69.74 kg)	(Cameroon) Joakhim Apie; 155.25 pounds (70.42 kg)	TKO (knees and punches)	1	2:29	
2	Heavyweight	(Russia) Denis Goltsov; 213.25 pounds (96.73 kg)	(Russia) Marat Aliaskhabov; 208.75 pounds (94.69 kg)	Submission (straight armbar)	1	4:56	
3	Light; Heavyweight	(Russia) Mikhail Zayats; 200.5 pounds (90.9 kg)	(Croatia) Matias Baric; 198.5 pounds (90.0 kg)	Submission (rear naked choke)	3	3:12	
4	Lightweight	(Germany) Daniel Weichel; 154.0 pounds (69.9 kg)	(Russia) Yuri Ivlev; 154.0 pounds (69.9 kg)	TKO (doctor stoppage)	3	2:34	
5	Welterweight	(Russia) Rashid Magomedov; 167.5 pounds (76.0 kg)	(Brazil) Igor Araujo; 170.25 pounds (77.22 kg)	Unanimous decision	3	5:00	
6	Welterweight	(England) Che Mills; 172.0 pounds (78.0 kg)	(Russia) Magomed Shikhshabekov; 168.0 pounds (76.2 kg)	Unanimous decision	4	5:00	Mills was 1 lb over weight
7	Lightweight	(Russia) Alexander Sarnavskiy; 153.25 pounds (69.51 kg)	(Netherlands) Victor Kuku; 155.5 pounds (70.5 kg)	KO (spinning back fist and punches)	1	0:14	
8	Lightweight	(Belarus) Artiom Damkovsky; 153.75 pounds (69.74 kg)	(Czech Republic) Mairbek Taisumov; 153.25 pounds (69.51 kg)	TKO (retirement)	3	2:52	Lightweight; Championship bout
9	Heavyweight	(Ukraine) Guram Gugenishvili; 249.5 pounds (113.2 kg)	(United States) Kenny Garner; 249.5 pounds (113.2 kg)	Technical submission (guillotine choke)	2	0:52	Heavyweight; Championship bout
10	Middleweight	(Russia) Alexei Belyaev; 184.0 pounds (83.5 kg)	(Russia) Alexei Nazarov; 182.75 pounds (82.89 kg)	Submission (guillotine choke)	2	0:50	
11	Light; Heavyweight	(Russia) Dmitry Samoilov; 198.75 pounds (90.15 kg)	(Russia) Gadzhimurad Omarov; 205.0 pounds (93.0 kg)	TKO (doctor stoppage)	3	0:28	

Except where otherwise indicated, details provided in the record box are taken from Sherdog.

== M-1 Challenge XXII: Narkun vs. Vasilevsky ==
The second M-1 Challenge event of the season took place on December 10, 2010, at the Druzhba Arena in Moscow, Russia.

- Lightweight bout: (Azerbaijan) Vusal Bairamov vs. (Russia) Alexander Tokarev

Tokarev defeated Bairamov via KO (punch) at 1:47 of round 1.

- Light heavyweight kids bout: (Russia) Azamat Chakerov vs. (Bulgaria) Stanislav Timochuk

Chakerov defeated Timochuk via submission (Kneebar) at 1:15 of round 3.

- Heavyweight bout: (Russia) Vitaly Minakov vs. (Russia) Valery Scherbakov

Minakov defeated Scherbakov via submission (armbar) at 1:05 of round 1.

- Women's Featherweight bout: (Belgium) Cindy Dandois vs. (Russia) Yana Kunitskaya

Kunitskaya defeated Dandois via TKO (punches) at 0:34 of round 1.

- Lightweight bout: (Russia) Alexander Sarnavskiy vs. (Russia) Arsen Ubaidulaev

Sarnavskiy defeated Ubaidulaev via submission (rear-naked choke) at 0:43 of round 1.

- Light Heavyweight bout: (Brazil) Vinny Magalhaes vs. (Russia) Alihan Magomedov

Magalhaes defeated Magomedov via submission (triangle armbar) at 1:10 of round 2.

- Heavyweight bout: (United States) Patrick Bennett vs. (Russia) Alexander Volkov

Bennett defeated Volkov via unanimous decision at 5:00 of round 4.

- Welterweight Championship bout: (Spain) Abner Lloveras vs. (Russia) Shamil Zavurov

Zavurov defeated Lloveras via TKO (punches) at 4:22 of round 4.

- Middleweight Championship bout: (Poland) Rafal Moks vs. (Russia) Magomed Sultanakhmedov

Moks defeated Sultanakhmedov via submission (heel hook) at 0:17 of round 1.

- Light Heavyweight Championship bout: (Poland) Tomasz Narkun vs. (Russia) Vyacheslav Vasilevsky

Vasilevsky defeated Narkun via TKO (retirement) at 2:20 of round 2.

- Welterweight bout: (United States) Luigi Fioravanti vs. (Russia) Arthur Guseinov

Fioravanti defeated Guseinov via submission (rear-naked choke) at 0:33 of round 4.

- Light Heavyweight bout: (Georgia (country)) David Tkeshelashvili vs. (Russia) Mikhail Zayats

Zayats defeated Tkeshelashvili via submission (rear-naked choke) at 2:26 of round 1.

- Light Heavyweight bout: (Russia) Viktor Nemkov vs. (United States) Daniel Vizcaya

Nemkov defeated Vizcaya via submission (triangle choke) at 1:09 of round 1.
