= 2011 M-1 Challenge season =

Mixed martial arts events

- League: M-1 Global
- Sport: Mixed Martial Arts
- Duration: March 5, 2011 – December 9, 2011

M-1 Challenge seasons
- ← 2010 2012 →

The 2011 M-1 Challenge season was the fourth season of mixed martial arts (MMA) fighting presented by the M-1 Global promotion. The season began on March 5.

== Events ==
=== M-1 Challenge XXIII: Grishin vs. Guram ===
The first M-1 Challenge event of 2011 took place on March 5, 2011, at the Crocus City in Moscow, Russia.

==== Main card (Russia 2 TV) ====
- Heavyweight Championship bout: (Georgia (country)) Guram Gugenishvili (c) vs. (Russia) Maxim Grishin

Gugenishvili defeated Grishin via submission (rear-naked choke) at 3:03 of round 1.

- Welterweight Championship bout: (Russia) Shamil Zavurov vs. (United States) Tom Gallicchio

Zavurov defeated Gallicchio via TKO (strikes) at 1:11 of round 2.

- Welterweight bout: (Russia) Rashid Magomedov vs. (Poland) Rafał Moks

Magomedov defeated Moks via TKO (strikes) at 2:06 of round 1.

- Lightweight bout: (Czech Republic) Mairbek Taisumov vs. (Russia) Yuri Ivlev

Taisumov defeated Ivlev via TKO (punches) at 1:34 of round 2.

- Middleweight bout: (Russia) Magomed Sultanakhmedov vs. (United States) Plinio Cruz

Sultanakhmedov defeated Cruz via TKO (strikes) at 1:11 of round 2.

==== Preliminary card (stream on mixfight.ru) ====
- Middleweight bout: (Russia) Magomedrasul Khasbulaev vs. (Germany) Daniel Weichel

Weichel defeated Magomedrasul via technical submission (triangle choke) at 3:13 of round 1.

- Heavyweight bout: (Portugal) Goncalo Salgado vs. (Russia) Arsen Abdulkerimov

Abdulkerimov defeated Salgado via submission (armbar) at 2:29 of round 1.

- Light heavyweight bout: (Russia) Igor Savelyev vs. (United States) Byron Byrd

Saveliev defeated Byrd via submission (rear-naked choke) at 2:12 of round 2.

- Light heavyweight bout: (Russia) Shamil Tinagadjiev vs. (Poland) Tomasz Narkun

Narkun defeated Tinagadjiev via submission (triangle choke) at 3:33 of round 1.

- Light heavyweight bout: (Russia) Maxim Bulahtin vs. (Russia) Magomed Ismailov

Ismailov defeated Bulahtin via submission (rear-naked choke) at 0:47 of round 2.

- Lightweight bout: (Azerbaijan) Vusal Bairamov vs. (Russia) Nikolai Kaushansky

Kaushansky defeated Bairamov via submission (rear-naked choke) at 1:31 of round 1.

=== M-1 Challenge XXIV: Damkovsky vs. Figueroa ===
The second M-1 Challenge event took place on March 25, 2011, at the Ted Constant Convocation Center in Norfolk, Virginia. This event marked the first M-1 show in the United States since 2009 and aired live on the Showtime cable network. The event drew an estimated 189,000 viewers on Showtime.

Due to problems with his visa Arthur Guseinov was unable to compete. Josh Bakkalao got injured during practice and was unable to face Alexander Sarnavskiy. He was replaced by Beau Baker.

==== Main card (Showtime TV) ====
- Lightweight Championship bout: (Belarus) Artiom Damkovsky (c) vs. (United States) Jose Figueroa

Figueroa defeated Damkovsky via TKO (punches) at 2:28 of round 2 to become the new M-1 Global Lightweight Champion.

- Middleweight Championship bout: (Russia) Magomed Sultanakhmedov vs. (United States) Tyson Jeffries

Sultanakhmedov defeated Jeffries via TKO (knees to the body) at 3:07 of round 2.

- Light heavyweight bout: (Brazil) Vinny Magalhaes vs. (United States) Jake Doerr

Magalhaes defeated Doerr via TKO (punches) at 1:47 of round 1.

- Middleweight bout: (United States) Jason Norwood vs. (United States) Mojo Horne

Norwood defeated Horne by unanimous decision (30-27, 30-27, 30-27).

- Lightweight bout: (Russia) Alexander Sarnavskiy vs. (United States) Beau Baker

Sarnavskiy defeated Baker via submission (rear-naked choke) at 2:32 of round 2.

==== Preliminary card ====
- Bantamweight bout: (United States) Marcus Daniels vs. (United States) Bryan Lasham

Lasham defeated Daniels via TKO (punches) at 0:57 of round 1.

- Featherweight bout: (United States) Bethany Marshall vs. (United States) Stacy Grant

Marshall defeated Grant via submission (toe hold) at 1:49 of round 2.

- Welterweight bout: (United States) Brian Nielson vs. (United States) Colton Smith

Smith defeated Nielson via submission (rear-naked choke) at 4:19 of round 1.

- Heavyweight bout: (United States) Johnny Curtis vs. (United States) Bobby Gurley

Curtis defeated Gurley via KO (punch to the body) at 0:36 of round 1.

- Lightweight bout: (United States) George Sheppard vs. (United States) David Derby

Sheppard defeated Derby via TKO (punches) at 1:50 of round 1.

- Bantamweight bout: (United States) Jessie Riggleman vs. (United States) Jason Hilliker

Riggleman defeated Hilliker via submission (guillotine choke) at 3:13 of round 1.

=== M-1 Challenge XXV: Zavurov vs. Enomoto ===
28 April 2011 Ice Palace Saint Petersburg in St.Petersburg, Russia. On this day it was announced that Dmitry Samoilov and Mike Guerin were injured during the training process and, unfortunately, will not be able to take part in the tournament M-1 Challenge XXV. Zavurov vs Magomedov. Rashid Magomedov was seriously injured and was out of title bout with Shamil Zavurov. M-1 Global has made sure to in such a short period of time to find a replacement, and literally a few minutes ago to sign the exclusive contract with M-1 Global has put Swiss welterweight Yasubi Enomoto, who last year was a finalist at the Grand Prix at Sengoku in his weight class.

==== Main card (Russia 2 TV) ====
- Welterweight Championship bout: (Russia) Shamil Zavurov (c) vs. (Switzerland) Yasubey Enomoto

Zavurov defeated Enomoto by unanimous decision (48-47, 48-47, 48-47).

- Light Heavyweight Championship bout: (Russia) Viktor Nemkov vs. (Brazil) Vinny Magalhaes

Magalhaes defeated Nemkov via submission (mounted gogoplata) at 1:40 of round 3.

- Middleweight bout: (Russia) Andrei Semenov vs. (United States) Luigi Fioravanti

Semenov defeated Fioravanti by unanimous decision (30-27, 30-27, 30-27).

- Light Heavyweight bout: (Russia) Mikhail Zayats vs. (France) Malik Merad

Zayats defeated Merad via TKO (punches) at 0:49 of round 2.

- Heavyweight bout: (Russia) Maxim Grishin vs. (Ukraine) Vladimir Kuchenko

Grishin defeated Kuchenko via TKO (punches) at 3:14 of round 3.

- Heavyweight bout: (Russia) Alexander Volkov vs. (Russia) Denis Goltsov

Volkov defeated Goltsov via TKO (punches) at 3:05 of round 2.

- Welterweight bout: (Russia) Alexander Yakovlev vs. (Germany) Christian Eckerlin

Yakovlev defeated Eckerlin via submission (rear-naked choke) at 3:14 of round 2.

==== Preliminary card (stream on mixfight.ru) ====
- Welterweight bout: (Spain) Juan Manuel Suarez vs. (Russia) Arsen Temirkhanov

Suarez defeated Temirkhanov by unanimous decision (29-28, 29-28, 29-28).

- Middleweight bout: (Russia) Murad Magomedov vs. (Russia) Ramazan Emeev

Emeev defeated Magomedov by unanimous decision (30-27, 29-28, 29-28).

- Welterweight bout: (Russia) Ramazan Esenbaev vs. (Russia) Albert Akhmetov

Esenbaev defeated Akhmetov via TKO (punches) at 2:49 of round 2.

=== M-1 European Battle ===
June 4, 2011 ACCO International Center Kyiv, Ukraine

==== Main card (Ustream.com) ====
- Welterweight bout: (Switzerland) Yasubey Enomoto vs. (Poland) Rafał Moks

Enomoto defeated Moks via majority decision (29-28, 28-28, 29-28).

- Lightweight bout: (Russia) Yuri Ivlev vs. (Belarus) Artiom Damkovsky

Ivlev defeated Damkovsky via unanimous decision (29-28, 29-28, 29-28).

- Welterweight bout: (Russia) Alexander Agafonov vs. (Russia) Husein Haliev

Haliev defeated Agafonov via unanimous decision (30-27, 30-27, 30-27).

- Lightweight bout: (Azerbaijan) Vugar Bakhshiev vs. (Croatia) Antun Račić

Račić defeated Bakhshiev via submission (rear-naked choke) at 3:54 of 3 round.

==== Preliminary card ====
- Lightweight bout: (Ukraine) Alexander Kozyr vs. (Ukraine) Semen Tyrlya

Kozyr defeated Tyrlya via submission (armbar) at 1:57 of 1 round.

- Welterweight bout: (Ukraine) Vadim Khaitulov vs. (Ukraine) Viktor Talashov

Khaitulov defeated Talashov via TKO (punch) at 1:24 of 1 round.

- Middleweight bout: (Russia) Ruslan Khaskhanov vs. (Ukraine) Andrei Dryapko

Dryapko defeated Khaskhanov via submission (shoulder injury) 1:57 of 1 round.

- Light Heavyweight bout: (Russia) Saparbek Safarov vs. (Ukraine) Denis Ivanets

Safarov defeated Ivanets via TKO (punches) at 3:00 of 1 round.

- Heavyweight bout: (Ukraine) Igor Zadernovsky vs. (Ukraine) Yuri Snegovskoy

Zadernovsky defeated Snegovskoy via submission (armbar) at 2:01 of 1 round.

==== European Gran Prix ====
- Lightweight bout: (Azerbaijan) Farkhad Fatalla vs. (Belarus) Ilya Tiunov

Fatalla defeated Tiunov via Submission (guillotine choke) at 1:48 of 1 round.

- Lightweight bout: (Ukraine) Serhiy Adamchuk vs. (Belarus) Sergey Sinkevich

Adamchuk defeated Sinkevich via KO (punch) at 2:47 of 2 round.

- Welterweight bout: (Ukraine) Vladimir Opanasenko vs. (Azerbaijan) Syanan Yusibov

Opanasenko defeated Yusibov via submission (armbar) at 0:41 of 1 round.

- Welterweight bout: (Ukraine) Vasily Novikov vs. (Moldova) Alexander Nimerenko

Novikov defeated Nimerenko via submission (armbar) at 3:10 of 2 round.

- Middleweight bout: (Ukraine) Alexander Dolotenko vs. (Russia) Filip Anasovich

Dolotenko defeated Anasovich via submission (armbar) at 1:15 of 1 round.

=== M-1 Challenge XXVI: Bennett vs. Garner II ===
The second M-1 Challenge event to air on Showtime took place on July 8, 2011, in Costa Mesa, California. Guram Gugenishvili was originally announced for the main event, but suffered a hand injury and was replaced by Garner.

==== Main card (Showtime TV) ====
- Heavyweight bout: (United States) Kenny Garner vs. (United States) Pat Bennett

Garner defeated Bennett via KO (punch) at 1:15 of round 2.

- Middleweight bout: (Russia) Arthur Guseinov vs. (United States) Tyson Jeffries

Guseinov defeated Jeffries via KO (back fist) at 1:32 of round 1.

- Lightweight bout: (Czech Republic) Mairbek Taisumov vs. (United States) Josh Bakkalao

Taisumov defeated Bakkalao via KO (punch) at 2:01 of round 1.

- Lightweight bout: (Germany) Daniel Weichel vs. (United States) Beau Baker

Weichel defeated Baker by unanimous decision (30-27, 30-27, 30-25).

- Middleweight bout: (United States) Eddie Arizmendi vs. (United States) Jason Norwood

Arizmendi defeated Norwood via KO (punch) at 4:55 of round 2.

==== Preliminary card (Allboxing.tv) ====
- Lightweight bout: (Russia) Max Martyniouk vs. (United States) Mike De Robles

Martyniouk defeated Robles via TKO (punches) at 2:30 of 1 round.

- Lightweight bout: (United States) Diman Morris vs. (United States) Brandon Michaels

Morris defeated Michaels by split decision (29-28, 27-30, 29-28).

=== M-1 Challenge XXVII: Magalhaes vs. Zayats ===
The third M-1 Challenge show on Showtime took place on October 14, 2011, at the Grand Canyon University Arena in Phoenix, Arizona.

Heavyweight champion Guram Gugenishvili was originally set to defend his title in a rematch against Kenny Garner, but pulled out of the bout due to an elbow injury.

==== Main card (Showtime TV) ====
- Light Heavyweight Championship bout: (Brazil) Vinny Magalhaes (c) vs. (Russia) Mikhail Zayats

Magalhaes defeated Zayats via TKO (head kick and punches) at 1:13 of round 3.

- Heavyweight Interim Championship bout: (United States) Kenny Garner vs. (Russia) Maxim Grishin

Garner defeated Grishin via submission (punches) at 4:07 of round 5.

- Middleweight bout: (United States) Eddie Arizmendi vs. (Russia) Arthur Guseinov

Guseinov defeated Arizmendi via submission (heel hook) at 0:50 of round 1.

- Welterweight bout: (United States) Josh Thorpe vs. (Switzerland) Yasubey Enomoto

Enomoto defeated Thorpe via submission (triangle choke) at 1:07 of round 1.

- Welterweight bout: (United States) Tom Gallicchio vs. (United States) Daniel Madrid

Madrid defeated Gallicchio via submission (armbar) at 0:48 of round 1.

==== Preliminary card ====
- Catchweight (158 lbs) bout: (United States) Ryan Crouch vs. (United States) Fredrik Lumpkin

Crouch defeated Lumpkin via TKO (punches) at 2:26 of round 2.

- Welterweight bout: (United States) Mike Chavez vs. (United States) Joe Martinez

Chavez defeated Martinez via split decision (29–28, 28–29, 29–28).

=== M-1 Challenge XXVIII: Emelianenko vs. Malikov ===
12 November, Star Centre, Astrakhan, Astrakhan Oblast

Shamil Zavurov was expected to defend his title against Rashid Magomedov on this card, but had to withdraw due to knee injury.

==== Main Card (PPV and Russia 2) ====
- Heavyweight bout: (Russia) Alexander Emelianenko vs. (Russia) Magomed Malikov

Malikov defeated Emelianenko via KO (punches) at 0:23 of round 1

- Light Heavyweight bout: (Russia) Alihan Magomedov vs. (United States) Isaiah Larson

Larson defeated Magomedov via submission (armbar) at 3:41 of round 2

- Lightweight bout: (Azerbaijan) Vugar Bakhshiev vs. (France) Yves Landu

Bakhshiev defeated Landu by split decision (30–27, 27–29, 29–27)

==== Preliminary card ====
- Middleweight bout: (Russia) Anton Kostishchin vs. (France) David Beaudrier

Beaudrier defeated Kostishchin via submission (arm-triangle choke) at 2:48 of round 2

M-1 Selection: GP 84 kg

- Middleweight bout: (Spain) Enoc Solves Torres vs. (Russia) Ruslan Khaskhanov

Torres defeated Khaskhanov via TKO (punches) at 1:00 of round 1

- Middleweight bout: (Czech Republic) Jan Zdansky vs. (Russia) Anatoly Tokov

Tokov defeated Zdansky via TKO (punches) at 4:20 of round 1

- Middleweight bout: (Bulgaria) Sunay Hamidov vs. (Russia) Alexei Martinov

Hamidov defeated Martinov via submission (triangle choke) at N/A of round 3

- Middleweight bout: (France) Gregory Babene vs. (Ukraine) Alexander Dolotenko

Babene defeated Dolotenko via submission (triangle choke) at 3:33 of round 1

=== M-1 Challenge XXIX: Samoilov vs. Miranda ===
19 November, Ufa Arena, Ufa, Bashkortostan

Vyacheslav Vasilevsky again was traumatized in a hand and according to its command, doctors have forbidden it to act until January, 2012.

==== Main Card ====
- Middleweight bout: (Russia) Dmitry Samoilov vs. (Brazil) Mario Miranda

Miranda defeated Samoilov via submission (kimura) at 3:58 of round 2

- Lightweight bout: (Croatia) Antun Račić vs. (Belarus) Artiom Damkovsky

Damkovsky defeated Račić via KO (slam) at 2:16 of round 1

- Middleweight bout: (Russia) Arsen Temirkhanov vs. (Germany) Christian Eckerlin

Temirkhanov defeated Eckerlin via submission (armbar) at 2:31 of round 1

- Welterweight bout: (Russia) Erik Oganov vs. (United States) Daniel Madrid

Oganov defeated Madrid via submission (armbar) at 1:24 of round 2

- Middleweight bout: (Russia) Magomed Aropkhanov vs. (Russia) Marat Gafurov

Gafurov defeated Aropkhanov by split decision (30–27, 28–29, 29–28).

- Middleweight bout: (Russia) Ramazan Emeev vs. (Russia) Ruslan Nadzhafaliev

Emeev defeated Nadzhafaliev via submission (rear-naked choke) at 2:50 of round 2

- Welterweight bout: (Brazil) Julio Cesar de Almeida vs. (Azerbaijan) Bahtiyar Arzumanov

Almeida defeated Arzumanov by unanimous decision (29–28, 29–28, 30–27).

==== Preliminary card ====
- Heavyweight bout: (Russia) Mikhail Istomin vs. (Russia) Timur Shihmagomedov

Istomin defeated Shihmagomedov via TKO (punches) at 0:24 of round 2

M-1 Selection: GP +93 kg

- Heavyweight bout: (Russia) Denis Komkin vs. (Russia) Ruslan Stepanyan

Goltsov defeated Stepanyan via KO (punches) at 1:34 of round 1

- Heavyweight bout: (Russia) Taimur Aslanov vs. (Russia) Denis Goltsov

Goltsov defeated Aslanov via submission (triangle choke) at 1:55 of round 1

- Heavyweight bout: (Russia) Akhmed Sultanov vs. (Ukraine) Vladimir Kuchenko

Sultanov defeated Kuchenko via submission (triangle choke) at 3:10 of round 1

- Heavyweight bout: (Estonia) Denis Smoldarev vs. (Russia) Niyazi Safarov

Smoldarev defeated Safarov via submission (armbar) at 2:10 of round 1

=== M-1 Global: Fedor vs. Monson ===
M-1 Global: Fedor vs. Monson
- Promotion: MMA-1
- Date: November 20, 2011
- Venue: Olympic Stadium
- City: Moscow, Russia
- Attendance: 22,153

M-1 Global: Fedor vs. Monson was a mixed martial arts event held by M-1 Global. The event took place on November 20, 2011, at the Olympic Stadium in Moscow, Russia. In the main fight Fedor Emelianenko defeated Jeff Monson via unanimous decision.

At the end of the heavyweight bout, Vladimir Putin entered the ring to congratulate the winner, Fedor Emelianenko, and gave a speech. The crowd booed during the speech; although some Russian media reports claimed that they had been booing the American loser, Jeff Monson, BBC News reported that several crowd members had stressed that they were booing Putin, and regarded Monson as an honorable loser.

==== Main card ====
- Heavyweight bout: (Russia) Fedor Emelianenko vs. (United States) Jeff Monson

Emelianenko defeated Monson by unanimous decision (30-27, 30-27, 30-27) .

- Lightweight Championship bout: (United States) Jose Figueroa (c) vs. (Germany) Daniel Weichel

Weichel defeated Figueroa via KO (punches) at 1:50 of round 1. Daniel became the new lightweight champion.

- Welterweight bout: (Russia) Alexander Yakovlev vs. (Spain) Juan Manuel Suarez

Yakovlev defeated Suarez via TKO (punches) at 3:55 of round 2.

- Lightweight bout: (Russia) Yuri Ivlev vs. (France) Jerome Bouisson

Ivlev defeated Bouisson via TKO (punch) at 1:00 of round 1.

- Lightweight bout: (Russia) Mairbek Taisumov vs. (United States) Joshua Thorpe

Taisumov defeated Thorpe via KO (punches) at 3:19 of round 2.

- Middleweight bout: (Russia) Albert Duraev vs. (France) Xavier Foupa-Pokam

Duraev defeated Foupa-Pokam via submission (triangle choke) at 2:37 of round 2.

==== Preliminary card ====
- Heavyweight bout: (Russia) Alexander Volkov vs. (Russia) Arsen Abdulkerimov

Volkov defeated Abdulkerimov via TKO (punches) at 1:00 of round 1.

- Light Heavyweight bout: (Russia) Salim Davidov vs. (Russia) Sergey Kornev

Davidov defeated Kornev by unanimous decision.

- Lightweight bout: (Russia) Mikhail Malyutin vs. (France) Seydina Seck

Malyutin defeated Seck via KO (punch) at 0:47 of round 1.

- Lightweight bout: (Russia) Nicholas Kaushansky vs. (Russia) Alexander Vinogradov

Kaushansky defeated Vinogradov via submission (rear-naked choke) at 1:23 of round 2.

=== M-1 Challenge XXX: Shamil Zavurov vs. Yasubey Enomoto II ===
This event took place on December 9, 2011, at The Hangar at the O.C. Fair and Events Center in Costa Mesa, California. It aired live on the Showtime cable network.

Alexander Sarnavskiy was scheduled to face Francisco Drinaldo, but the bout was cancelled when Drinaldo suffered an injury. Sarnavskiy instead faced Sergio Cortez.

==== Main Card (Showtime) ====
- Welterweight Championship bout: (Russia) Shamil Zavurov (c) vs. (Switzerland) Yasubey Enomoto

Enomoto defeated Zavurov via submission (guillotine choke) at 4:10 of Round 5.

- Lightweight bout: (Belarus) Artiom Damkovsky vs. (United States) Jose Figueroa

Damkovsky defeated Figueroa via KO (punch) at 2:19 of Round 1.

- Lightweight bout: (Russia) Alexander Sarnavskiy vs. (United States) Sergio Cortez

Sarnavskiy defeated Cortez via submission (rear naked choke) at 1:46 of Round 1.

- Middleweight bout: (United States) Eddie Arizmendi vs. (United States) Tyson Jeffries

Jeffries defeated Arizmendi via submission (d'arce choke) at 2:08 of Round 2.

- Featherweight bout: (United States) Alvin Cacdac vs. (United States) Bao Quach

Quach defeated Cacdac via submission (triangle/armbar) at 3:33 of Round 1.

== See also ==
- M-1 Global
