= 2007 in M-1 Global =

Mixed martial arts events

Information
- First date: January 20, 2007
- Last date: July 21, 2007

Events
- Total events: 4

Fights
- Total fights: 23

Chronology
2006 in M-1	2007 in M-1 Global	2008 in M-1

The year 2007 is the 11th year in the history of M-1 Global, a mixed martial arts promotion based in Russia. In 2007 M-1 Global held 4 events beginning with, M-1 MFC: Russia vs. Korea.

== Events list ==
#	Event Title	Date	Arena	Location
43	M-1 MFC: Battle on the Neva	July 21, 2007		Saint Petersburg, Russia
42	M-1 MFC: International Mix Fight	March 17, 2007		Saint Petersburg, Russia
41	M-1 MFC: Northwest Championships	March 10, 2007		Saint Petersburg, Russia
40	M-1 MFC: Russia vs. Korea	January 20, 2007		

== M-1 MFC: Russia vs. Korea ==
M-1 MFC: Russia vs. Korea was an event held on January 20, 2007 in Saint Petersburg, Russia.

=== Results ===
Main Card
Weight class				Method	Round	Time	Notes
	Roman Zentsov	def.	Sang Soo Lee	Decision (Unanimous)	3	5:00
	Hyun Sung Hwang	def.	Sergey Kaznovsky	Decision (Unanimous)	3	5:00
	Mikhail Malyutin	def.	Cha Jin Wook	Decision (Majority)	3	5:00
	Hyung Seok Lee	def.	Vladimir Zenin	Decision (Split)	3	5:00
	Dmitry Samoilov	def.	Jung Yong Yu	Technical Submission (Triangle Choke)	3	1:50
	Erik Oganov	def.	Seung Pil Choi	Technical Submission (Straight Armbar)	1	2:59
	Mikhail Zayats	def.	Jin O Kim	Submission (Armbar)	1	2:00
	Arman Gambaryan	def.	Bo Kyung Seol	Submission (Kimura)	1	1:19
	Amar Suloev	def.	Hoon Kim	TKO (Punches)	1	4:35
	Kirill Sidelnikov	def.	Dong Woo Shin	TKO (Head Kick and Punches)	1	0:19
	Julia Berezikova	def.	Lee Jin Song	TKO (Punches)	1	0:51

== M-1 MFC: Northwest Championships ==
M-1 MFC: Northwest Championships was an event held on March 10, 2007 in Saint Petersburg, Russia.

=== Results ===
Main Card
Weight class				Method	Round	Time	Notes
	Baga Agaev	def.	Sergei Kotin	Submission (Rear Naked Choke)	1	1:25
	Said Khalilov	def.	Mali Magomedaliev	Decision (Unanimous)	2	5:00
	Alexey Prokofiev	def.	Timur Gasanov	Submission (Armbar)	2	2:37
	Alexei Belyaev	def.	Sergei Boikov	Decision (Unanimous)	2	5:00
	Amir Shankhalov	def.	Maxim Kochetov	Decision (Unanimous)	2	5:00
	Gocha Markoziya	def.	Jujuev Zaodin	Decision (Unanimous)	2	5:00

== M-1 MFC: International Mix Fight ==
M-1 MFC: International Mix Fight was an event held on March 17, 2007 in Saint Petersburg, Russia.

=== Results ===
Main Card
Weight class				Method	Round	Time	Notes
	Baga Agaev	def.	Sergei Kotin	Submission (Rear Naked Choke)	1	1:25
	Said Khalilov	def.	Mali Magomedaliev	Decision (Unanimous)	2	5:00
	Alexey Prokofiev	def.	Timur Gasanov	Submission (Armbar)	2	2:37
	Alexei Belyaev	def.	Sergei Boikov	Decision (Unanimous)	2	5:00
	Amir Shankhalov	def.	Maxim Kochetov	Decision (Unanimous)	2	5:00
	Gocha Markoziya	def.	Jujuev Zaodin	Decision (Unanimous)	2	5:00

== M-1 MFC: Battle on the Neva ==
M-1 MFC: Battle on the Neva was an event held on July 21, 2007 in Saint Petersburg, Russia.

=== Results ===
Main Card
Weight class				Method	Round	Time	Notes
	Alexander Emelianenko	def.	Jessie Gibbs	Submission (Kimura)	1	N/A
	Erik Oganov	def.	Abner Lloveras	Decision	3	5:00
	Mikhail Zayats	def.	Lukasz Jurkowski	Submission (Choke)	3	N/A
	Gegard Mousasi	def.	Alexander Kokoev	Decision (Unanimous)	3	5:00
	Vladimir Zenin	def.	Seydina Seck	TKO (Punches)	3	N/A
	Antonio Mendes	def.	Kirill Sidelnikov	TKO (Doctor Stoppage)	2	N/A
	Dmitry Samoilov	def.	Bohumil Lungrik	TKO (Cut)	2	N/A
	Arman Gambaryan	def.	Karl Amoussou	Decision	3	5:00
	Sergey Verdesh	def.	Brian Lo-A-Njoe	Submission (Triangle Choke)	2	N/A
	Joao Wilson	def.	Uriy Pulaev	Submission (Rear-Naked Choke)	1	N/A
	Radmir Gabdullin	def.	Alexei Belyaev	Submission (Armbar)	1	N/A
	Mikhail Malyutin	def.	Artiom Damkovsky	Decision	3	5:00

== See also ==
- M-1 Global
