= M-1 Challenge =

Mixed martial arts events

M-1 Challenge is a competitions organized by M-1 Global with a series of events held in different places around the world where MMA fighters compete against each other. The events are broadcast in over 100 countries. Fighters in over 30 countries applied to compete.

== Seasons ==
- 2008 M-1 Challenge season
- 2009 M-1 Challenge season
- 2010 M-1 Challenge season
- 2011 M-1 Challenge season
- 2012 M-1 Challenge season

== See also ==
- M-1 Global
- M-1 Selection
