= 2008 M-1 Challenge season =

Mixed martial arts events

- League: M-1 Global
- Sport: Mixed Martial Arts
- Duration: March 2, 2008 – January 11, 2009

M-1 Challenge seasons
- 2009 →

The 2008 M-1 Challenge season was the first season of mixed martial arts (MMA) fighting presented by the M-1 Global promotion.

== Main Rules ==
- 5 Fighters in team
- 9 Countries
- 20 Rounds and final

== Final Team Standings ==
| Group A | team record | overall record |
|---|---|---|
| (Russia) Red Devil | 3-1 | 15-5 |
| Finland | 3-1 | 13-7 |
| France | 2-2 | 9-11 |
| South Korea | 1-3 | 7-13 |
| (United States) USA | 1-3 | 6-14 |
| Group B | team record | overall record |
| (Netherlands) Holland | 3-1 | 13-7 |
| (Russia) Legion | 3-1 | 12-8 |
| Japan | 2-2 | 9-11 |
| Spain | 2-2 | 9-9 |
| Germany | 1-3 | 7-13 |

- January 11, 2009 M-1 Challenge Finals

At Holland

(Russia) Russian Red Devil defeated (Netherlands) Holland 4-1 to claim the first M-1 Challenge.

== Events ==
| Event | Date | Location | Schedule |
|---|---|---|---|
| M-1 Challenge 1 (1) | 02.03.2008 | Holland (Amsterdam) | France vs. Red Devil (Russia) (3-2) |
| M-1 Challenge 1 (2) | 02.03.2008 | Holland (Amsterdam) | (Netherlands) Holland vs. Germany (5-0) |
| M-1 Challenge 2 (3) | 03.04.2008 | Russia (Saint-Petersburg) | Finland vs. South Korea (4-1) |
| M-1 Challenge 2 (4) | 03.04.2008 | Russia (Saint-Petersburg) | Japan vs. Russia Legion (3-2) |
| M-1 Challenge 3 (5) | 31.05.2008 | Spain | Finland vs. (United States) USA (4-1) |
| M-1 Challenge 3 (6) | 31.05.2008 | Spain | Spain vs. (Netherlands) Holland (3-2) |
| M-1 Challenge 4 (7) | 27.06.2008 | Russia (Saint-Petersburg) | (Russia) Red Devil vs. Finland (4-1) |
| M-1 Challenge 4 (8) | 27.06.2008 | Russia (Saint-Petersburg) | (Russia) Legion vs. Spain (3-2) |
| M-1 Challenge 5 (9) | 17.07.2008 | Japan | France vs. (United States) USA (3-2) |
| M-1 Challenge 5 (10) | 17.07.2008 | Japan | (Netherlands) Holland vs. Japan (4-1) |
| M-1 Challenge 6 (11) | 24.08.2008 | Korea | (United States) USA vs. South Korea (3-2) |
| M-1 Challenge 6 (12) | 24.08.2008 | Korea | Germany vs. Japan (4-1) |
| M-1 Challenge 7 (13) | 27.09.2008 | UK | (Russia) Red Devil vs. (United States) USA (5-0) |
| M-1 Challenge 7 (14) | 27.09.2008 | UK | (Russia) Legion vs. Germany (4-1) |
| M-1 Challenge 8 (15) | 11.10.2008 | USA | South Korea vs. France (3-2) |
| M-1 Challenge 8 (16) | 11.10.2008 | USA | Japan vs. Spain (4-1) |
| M-1 Challenge 9 (17) | 21.11.2008 | Russia | (Russia) Red Devil vs. South Korea (4-1) |
| M-1 Challenge 9 (18) | 21.11.2008 | Russia | (Russia) Legion vs. (Netherlands) Holland (3-2) |
| M-1 Challenge 10 (19) | 26.11.2008 | Finland | Finland vs. France (4-1) |
| M-1 Challenge 10 (20) | 26.11.2008 | Finland | Spain vs. Germany (3-2) |
| M-1 Challenge Final (21) | 11.01.2009 | Holland | (Russia) Red Devil vs. (Netherlands) Holland (4-1) |
