= Karl Amoussou =

French mixed martial arts fighter

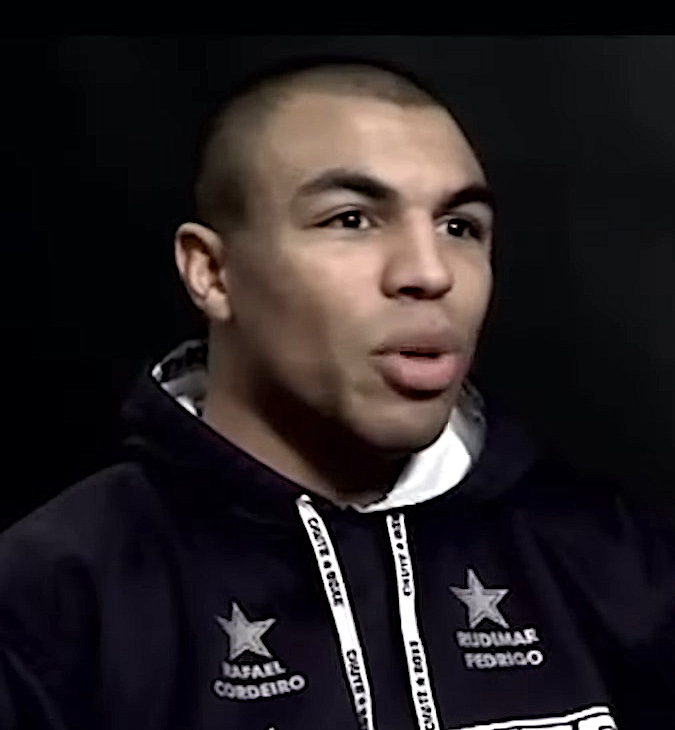
- Born: November 21, 1985 (age 40); Draguignan, France
- Other names: Psycho
- Nationality: French; German
- Height: 5 ft 11 in (1.80 m)
- Weight: 170 lb (77 kg; 12 st 2 lb)
- Division: Welterweight; Middleweight
- Reach: 70 in (178 cm)
- Fighting out of: Paris, France
- Team: Team Amoussou; Haute Tension; American Top Team
- Rank: Black belt in Judo
- Years active: 2006–2023

Mixed martial arts record
- Total: 40
- Wins: 27
- By knockout: 8
- By submission: 14
- By decision: 4
- By disqualification: 1
- Losses: 11
- By knockout: 4
- By decision: 7
- Draws: 2

Other information
- Spouse: Ana Amousso
- Notable relatives: Bertrand Amoussou-Guenou, brother
- Mixed martial arts record from Sherdog

Karl Amoussou (born November 21, 1985) is a French-German professional mixed martial artist who most recently competed in the Welterweight division of Cage Warriors, where he is the current Welterweight Champion. A professional competitor since 2006, he has also formerly competed for Strikeforce, DREAM, M-1 Global, Pancrase and Bellator MMA.

== Background ==
Amoussou was born in Draguignan, France. His martial arts background is in judo, his older brother Bertrand being a medal-winning judoka for France in the 1990 European Judo Championships as well as the first and only French fighter to win a fight in Pride FC, while Amoussou's Senegalese father was also a successful karate stylist. Before becoming a full-time fighter, Amoussou worked full-time as an undercover agent in his native France, mostly tracking down drug dealers and thieves.

== Mixed martial arts career ==
Amoussou (nicknamed Psycho) is a member of the Team France and Team "Haute Tension". His trainers are one time PRIDE Fighting Championship fighter and older brother Bertrand Amoussou.

Amoussou was set to headline M-1 Global Presents: Breakthrough against top contender Nick Thompson but his opponent was later changed to journeyman John Doyle due to an injury Thompson suffered during training.

Amoussou signed an exclusive four fight contract with top Japanese promotion Dream and North American promotion Strikeforce. He fought in Strikeforce against UFC veteran Trevor Prangley and in Dream against Pride veteran Kazuhiro Nakamura. In April 2011, he defeated Nathan Shouteren via decision after a spectacular fight where he showed his "Psycho" style again.

In November 2010, he went to The Ultimate Fighter selections in Las Vegas, but his weight class was not selected.

=== Bellator Fighting Championships ===
Amoussou then signed for Bellator and he made his debut on May 21, 2011 against Sam Alvey at Bellator 45, losing via split decision. He rebounded with a TKO victory over Jesus Martinez at Bellator 59 in November 2011.

Amoussou then took part in the Welterweight Tournament scheduled to take place in Bellator's sixth season. He was expected to fight War Machine in the opening round of the tournament at Bellator 63. However, War Machine was sentenced to a year in prison for an assault in Las Vegas, Nevada and was forced out of the bout and the tournament. Instead, he faced Chris Lozano and won via submission in the first round.

In the semifinals at Bellator 69, Amoussou faced undefeated David Rickels. The bout was back-and-forth with Amoussou on the receiving end of multiple groin shots. In the end, Amoussou won the fight via split decision.

Amoussou faced Bryan Baker on July 20, 2012 in the finals at Bellator 72. He won the fight via submission in just under a minute, earning $100,000 and a title shot. He faced welterweight champion Ben Askren in Bellator's seventh season in the fall of 2012. He then lost by TKO to Askren for the title.

Amoussou next faced promotional newcomer Paul Bradley on October 18, 2013 at Bellator 104. He lost the fight via unanimous decision. Amossou then faced David Gomez on April 18, 2014, at Bellator 117. He won fight via split decision, snapping his two fight losing streak.

Amoussou faced Fernando Gonzalez at Bellator 122 on July 25, 2014. He lost the fight via unanimous decision.

=== Post Bellator ===
Going 10–2 since leaving Bellator, Amoussou face Abdoul Abdouraguimov on June 25, 2022 at Ares FC 7 for the AFC Welterweight Championship. He lost the bout after the doctor stopped the bout after the first round.

Amoussou faced Mickaël Lebout on December 8, 2022 at Ares FC 10, losing the bout via unanimous decision.

== Championships and accomplishments ==
- Bellator Fighting Championships
  - Bellator Season 6 Welterweight Tournament Championship
  - 2012 Bellator Submission of the Year (against Bryan Baker)

== Mixed martial arts record ==
Professional record breakdown
40 matches	27 wins	11 losses
By knockout	8	4
By submission	14	0
By decision	4	7
By disqualification	1	0
Draws	2	

Res.	Record	Opponent	Method	Event	Date	Round	Time	Location	Notes
Loss	27–11–2	Mickaël Lebout	Decision (unanimous)	Ares FC 10	December 8, 2022	3	5:00	Paris, France	
Loss	27–10–2	Abdoul Abdouraguimov	TKO (doctor stoppage)	Ares FC 7	June 25, 2022	1	5:00	Paris, France	For the Ares FC Welterweight Championship.
Win	27–9–2	André Ricardo	Submission (achilles lock)	Hexagone MMA 2	October 30, 2021	1	4:31	Paris, France	Won the inaugural Hexagone Welterweight Championship.
Win	26–9–2	Vitoldas Jagelo	DQ (kick after the bell)	Hexagone MMA 1	July 9, 2021	1	5:00	Paris, France	Catchweight (173 lb) bout.
Win	25–9–2	Zoran Đođ	TKO (knees)	Soko FC 1	May 29, 2021	1	2:50	Dudelange, Luxembourg	Catchweight (181 lb) bout.
Loss	24–9–2	Rodrigo Cavalheiro Correia	KO (punch)	Brave CF 13	June 9, 2018	2	1:08	Belfast, Northern Ireland	
Loss	24–8–2	Dominique Steele	Decision (unanimous)	Cage Warriors 89	November 25, 2017	3	5:00	Antwerp, Belgium	Non-title bout; Steele missed weight (172.9 lb).
Win	24–7–2	Matt Inman	TKO (punches)	Cage Warriors 80	February 18, 2017	1	3:13	London, England	Won the vacant Cage Warriors Welterweight Championship.
Win	23–7–2	Juho Valamaa	KO (punch)	EuroFC 1	October 1, 2016	1	3:44	Espoo, Finland	
Win	22–7–2	Giovanni Melillo	TKO (head kick and punches)	Venator FC 3	May 21, 2016	1	4:51	Milan, Italy	
Win	21–7–2	Hakon Foss	Submission (heel hook)	Venator FC 2	December 13, 2015	1	0:52	Rimini, Italy	
Win	20–7–2	Abdulmazhid Magomedov	Submission (armbar)	Abu Dhabi Warriors 3	October 3, 2015	1	3:43	Abu Dhabi, United Arab Emirates	
Win	19–7–2	Florent Betorangal	Submission (heel hook)	World Warriors FC: Cage Encounter 4	September 19, 2015	1	3:03	Paris, France	
Win	18–7–2	Felipe Salvador Nsue Ayiugono	Submission (armbar)	Fightor 1: Lister vs. Knaap	January 17, 2015	3	3:26	Charleroi, Belgium	Catchweight (183 lb) bout.
Loss	17–7–2	Fernando Gonzalez	Decision (unanimous)	Bellator 122	July 25, 2014	3	5:00	Temecula, California, United States	
Win	17–6–2	David Gomez	Decision (split)	Bellator 117	April 18, 2014	3	5:00	Council Bluffs, Iowa, United States	
Loss	16–6–2	Paul Bradley	Decision (unanimous)	Bellator 104	October 18, 2013	3	5:00	Cedar Rapids, Iowa, United States	
Loss	16–5–2	Ben Askren	TKO (doctor stoppage)	Bellator 86	January 24, 2013	3	5:00	Thackerville, Oklahoma, United States	For the Bellator Welterweight World Championship.
Win	16–4–2	Bryan Baker	Submission (inverted heel hook)	Bellator 72	July 20, 2012	1	0:56	Tampa, Florida, United States	Won the Bellator Season 6 Welterweight Tournament.
Win	15–4–2	David Rickels	Decision (split)	Bellator 69	May 18, 2012	3	5:00	Lake Charles, Louisiana, United States	Bellator Season 6 Welterweight Tournament Semifinal.
Win	14–4–2	Chris Lozano	Submission (rear-naked choke)	Bellator 63	March 30, 2012	1	2:05	Uncasville, Connecticut, United States	Welterweight debut. Bellator Season 6 Welterweight Tournament Quarterfinal.
Win	13–4–2	Jesus Martinez	TKO (punches)	Bellator 59	November 26, 2011	1	2:20	Atlantic City, New Jersey, United States	Catchweight (175 lb) bout.
Loss	12–4–2	Sam Alvey	Decision (split)	Bellator 45	May 21, 2011	3	5:00	Lake Charles, Louisiana, United States	
Win	12–3–2	Nathan Schouteren	Decision (split)	Pancrace FC 3	April 2, 2011	2	5:00	Marseille, France	
Loss	11–3–2	Kazuhiro Nakamura	Decision (unanimous)	Dream 15	July 10, 2010	2	5:00	Saitama, Japan	
Draw	11–2–2	Trevor Prangley	Technical Draw (accidental thumb to eye)	Strikeforce Challengers: Kaufman vs. Hashi	February 26, 2010	1	4:14	San Jose, California, United States	
Win	11–2–1	John Doyle	Submission (rear-naked choke)	M-1 Global: Breakthrough	August 28, 2009	1	3:15	Kansas City, Missouri, United States	
Win	10–2–1	Kazuhiro Hamanaka	KO (flying knee)	M-1 Challenge 14	April 29, 2009	1	0:23	Tokyo, Japan	
Win	9–2–1	Grégory Babene	Submission (armbar)	100% Fight 1	January 10, 2009	2	3:05	Paris, France	
Loss	8–2–1	Lucio Linhares	TKO (punches)	M-1 Challenge 10	November 26, 2008	1	4:52	Helsinki, Finland	
Win	8–1–1	Min Seok-heo	Decision (split)	M-1 Challenge 8	October 29, 2008	3	5:00	Kansas City, Missouri, United States	
Win	7–1–1	Mike Dolce	TKO (kick to the body)	M-1 Challenge 5	July 17, 2008	2	0:41	Tokyo, Japan	
Win	6–1–1	Dmitry Samoilov	KO (head kick)	M-1 Challenge 1	March 2, 2008	1	0:18	Almere, Netherlands	
Loss	5–1–1	Arman Gambaryan	Decision (unanimous)	M-1: Battle on the Neva 1	July 21, 2007	3	5:00	Saint Petersburg, Russia	Light Heavyweight bout.
Win	5–0–1	Mark O'Toole	Submission (rear-naked choke)	Cage Warriors 27	April 28, 2007	1	2:38	Nottingham, England	
Win	4–0–1	Alexander Yakovlev	Submission (armbar)	M-1: International Fight Night 8	March 17, 2007	1	1:44	Saint Petersburg, Russia	
Win	3–0–1	Brian Maulany	Submission	Rings Holland: Beverwijk Top Team 2006	October 15, 2006	1	N/A	Beverwijk, Holland	
Win	2–0–1	Lee Chadwick	Submission (rear-naked choke)	Cage Warriors 24	September 16, 2006	1	0:31	Sheffield, England	Middleweight debut.
Win	1–0–1	Colin McKee	Submission (triangle choke)	2 Hot 2 Handle: Road to Japan	June 18, 2006	1	0:35	Amsterdam, Netherlands	
Draw	0–0–1	Marcello Salazar	Draw	World Kickboxing Network: Championnat D'Europe	May 6, 2006	2	N/A	Geneva, Switzerland	Light Heavyweight debut.

== See also ==
- List of male mixed martial artists
