= Jordan Radev =

Bulgarian mixed martial arts fighter

- Born: March 4, 1976 (age 50); Pomorie, Bulgaria
- Native name: Йордан Радев
- Nationality: Bulgarian
- Height: 5 ft 7 in (1.70 m)
- Weight: 170 lb (77 kg; 12 st)
- Division: Welterweight (2009–2011); Middleweight (2002–2009)
- Reach: 70 in (178 cm)
- Team: Fight Factory
- Years active: 8 (2002-present)

Mixed martial arts record
- Total: 28
- Wins: 23
- By knockout: 5
- By submission: 5
- By decision: 12
- By disqualification: 1
- Losses: 5
- By knockout: 2
- By decision: 3

Other information
- Mixed martial arts record from Sherdog

Jordan Radev (Bulgarian: Йордан Радев; born March 4, 1976) is a Bulgarian wrestler and professional mixed martial artist. He was the second Bulgarian mixed martial artist to fight in the Ultimate Fighting Championship in its middleweight division.

Radev had two bouts in the UFC - at UFC Fight Night 10 against Andrew McFedries, and at UFC 79 against Dean Lister. After the UFC bouts, his next fight was scheduled to be against the Cuban/Australian judoka Hector Lombard in the Australian promotion Cage Fighting Championships. However, he was denied a visa to Australia and therefore did not appear.

Besides the UFC, Radev has fought in various other organizations, marking notable wins against the Polish MMA legend Grzegorz Jakubowski in KSW 9 – Konfrontacja, Yuya Shirai in M-1 Global, and against Alexander Shlemenko in the Helsinki Fight Festival. He is also the head MMA coach of the Bulgarian National MMA team in the M-1 Challenge fighting league.

While still active as an MMA fighter, Radev is currently also the head MMA trainer in the Fight Factory in Brooklyn, New York, - the largest boxing and MMA gym on the US East Coast.

== Mixed martial arts record ==
Professional record breakdown
28 matches	23 wins	5 losses
By knockout	5	2
By submission	5	0
By decision	12	3
By disqualification	1	0

Res.	Record	Opponent	Method	Event	Date	Round	Time	Location	Notes
Loss	23–5	Paul Daley	Decision (unanimous)	BAMMA 7: Trigg vs. Wallhead	September 10, 2011	3	5:00	Birmingham, England	176lb catchweight. A percentage of Daley's purse was forfeited to Radev for being overweight.
Win	23–4	Maro Perak	Decision (split)	M-1 Selection 2010: Western Europe Round 3	May 29, 2010	3	5:00	Helsinki, Finland	
Win	22–4	Wanderson Silva	Decision (unanimous)	BMMAF - Warriors 12	November 21, 2009	2	5:00	Ruse, Bulgaria	Drops to Welterweight
Win	21–4	Alexander Shlemenko	KO (punch)	FF 26 – Fight Festival 26	October 17, 2009	2	4:27	Helsinki, Finland	
Win	20–4	Danny Smit	Decision (unanimous)	M-1 Challenge 15: Brazil	May 9, 2009	3	5:00	São Paulo, Brazil	
Loss	19–4	Herbert Goodman	TKO (punches)	M-1 Challenge 13: Bulgaria	March 28, 2009	2	4:59	Burgas, Bulgaria	
Win	19–3	Rafael Rodriguez	Technical Submission (rear naked choke)	M-1 Challenge 10: Finland	November 28, 2008	1	1:08	Helsinki, Finland	
Win	18–3	Faycal Hussin	Decision (unanimous)	BMMAF: Warriors 6	November 8, 2008	2	5:00	Stara Zagora, Bulgaria	
Win	17–3	Damir Mihajlovic	Decision (unanimous)	BMMAF: Warriors 5	September 28, 2008	2	5:00	Plovdiv, Bulgaria	
Win	16–3	Yuya Shirai	Decision (majority)	M-1 Challenge 6: Korea	August 29, 2008	2	5:00	Seoul, South Korea	
Win	15–3	Denis Smith	Submission (heel hook)	BMMAF: Warriors 4	August 3, 2008	2	1:22	Sveti Vlas, Bulgaria	
Win	14–3	Alexander Stefkovski	Submission (keylock)	BMMAF: Warriors 3	June 7, 2008	1	3:15	Burgas, Bulgaria	
Win	13–3	Grzegorz Jakubowski	Decision	KSW IX: Konfrontacja	May 9, 2008	2	5:00	Warsaw, Poland	
Win	12–3	Rosen Dimitrov	Decision (unanimous)	Real Pain Challenge 1	March 9, 2008	3	5:00	Sofia, Bulgaria	
Loss	11–3	Dean Lister	Decision (unanimous)	UFC 79	December 29, 2007	3	5:00	Las Vegas, Nevada, United States	
Loss	11–2	Drew McFedries	KO (punches)	UFC Fight Night 10	June 12, 2007	1	0:33	Hollywood, Florida, United States	
Win	11–1	Ivan Brguljan	Decision	Kam Lung: Only the Strongest Survive 5	October 8, 2006	2		Zuidland, Netherlands	
Win	10–1	Martin Zawada	Decision	2H2H: Road to Japan	September 8, 2007	1	10:00	Netherlands	
Win	9–1	Antony Rea	TKO	2H2H: Road to Japan	June 18, 2006	1	2:24	Netherlands	
Loss	8–1	Robert Jocz	Decision	KSW V: Konfrontacja	June 3, 2006			Warsaw, Poland	
Win	8–0	Martin Malkhasyan	Decision	Fury FC 2: 93 kg GP	June 3, 2006	2		Warsaw, Poland	
Win	7–0	Brian Maulany	TKO (rope escape)	K-1 MAX Netherlands 2006	March 26, 2006	2		Utrecht, Netherlands	
Win	6–0	Jorge Santiago	Decision (unanimous)	It's Showtime Boxing & MMA Event 2005 Amsterdam	June 12, 2005	2	5:00	Amsterdam, Netherlands	
Win	5–0	Arshak Dabagiyan	TKO (strikes)	2 Hot 2 Handle	October 10, 2004	2	n/a	Rotterdam, Netherlands	
Win	4–0	Lars Besand	KO (head kick)	Mix Fight Gala	March 21, 2004	1	0:08	Almere Stad, Netherlands	
Win	3–0	Nordin Ben-Sallah	Submission (toe hold)	Rings Holland: The Untouchables	September 27, 2003	3	0:31	Utrecht, Netherlands	
Win	2–0	Rafles la Rose	KO (punch)	2H2H 6: Simply the Best 6	March 16, 2003	1	5:49	Rotterdam, Netherlands	
Win	1–0	Dennis Scholten	Submission (choke)	Together Productions: Night of the Sensation	November 16, 2002	1	n/a	Steenwijk, Netherlands	
