= 2008 in M-1 Global =

Mixed martial arts events

Information
- First date: July 21, 2008
- Last date: November 26, 2008

Events
- Total events: 12

Fights
- Total fights: 144

Chronology
2007 in M-1	2008 in M-1 Global	2009 in M-1

The year 2008 is the 12th year in the history of M-1 Global, a mixed martial arts promotion based in Russia. In 2008 M-1 Global held 12 events beginning with, M-1: Slamm.

== Events list ==
#	Event title	Date	Arena	Location
55	M-1 Challenge 10: Finland	November 26, 2008	Töölö Sports Hall	Helsinki, Finland
54	M-1 Challenge 9: Russia	November 21, 2008	Ice Palace Saint Petersburg	Saint Petersburg, Russia
53	M-1: Staredown 2	November 16, 2008		Germany
52	M-1 Challenge 8: USA	October 29, 2008	Harrah's Casino	Kansas City, Missouri, United States
51	M-1 Challenge 7: UK	September 27, 2008	Harvey Hadden Stadium	Nottingham, England
50	M-1 Challenge 6: Korea	August 29, 2008		South Korea
49	M-1 Challenge 5: Japan	July 17, 2008	Shinjuku Face	Tokyo, Japan
48	M-1 Challenge 4: Battle on the Neva 2	June 27, 2008	The Flying Dutchman	Saint Petersburg, Russia
47	M-1 Challenge 3: Gran Canaria	May 31, 2008	Sioux City	San Agustin, Gran Canaria, Spain
46	M-1 MFC: Fedor Emelianenko Cup	May 15, 2008		Russia
45	M-1 Challenge 2: Russia	April 3, 2008	Ice Palace Saint Petersburg	Saint Petersburg, Russia
44	M-1: Slamm	March 2, 2008		Almere, Flevoland, Netherlands

== M-1: Slamm ==
M-1: Slamm was an event held on March 2, 2008, in Almere, Flevoland, Netherlands.

=== Results ===
Main Card
Weight class				Method	Round	Time	Notes
	Dave Dalgliesh	def.	Bruno Carvalho	KO (Punch)	1	3:53
	Kamil Uygun	def.	Lopez Owonyebe	TKO (Punches)	1	0:00
	Mehmet Uygun	def.	Oktay Karatas	Submission (Guillotine Choke)	2	1:56
	Kirill Sidelnikov	def.	Martin Soltisyk	KO (Punch)	1	2:25
	Mikhail Zayats	def.	Christophe Daffreville	Decision (Unanimous)	2	5:00
	Karl Amoussou	def.	Dmitry Samoilov	KO (Head Kick)	1	0:18
	Farouk Lakebir	def.	Erik Oganov	Decision (Unanimous)	2	5:00
	Bendy Casimir	def.	Mikhail Malyutin	Decision (Split)	2	5:00
	Jessie Gibbs	def.	Alexander Murawski	Submission (Arm-Triangle Choke)	1	1:49
	Gegard Mousasi	def.	Steve Mensing	TKO (Punches)	1	2:44
	Jason Jones	def.	Daniel Weichel	TKO (Punch and Knee)	1	0:06
	Romano de los Reyes	def.	Franco de Leonardis	KO (Slam and Punches)	1	0:15
	Bogdan Cristea	def.	Sven Wegscheider	TKO (Punches)	1	4:32

== M-1 Challenge 2: Russia ==
M-1 Challenge 2: Russia was an event held on April 3, 2008, at The Ice Palace Saint Petersburg in Saint Petersburg, Russia.

=== Results ===
Main Card
Weight class				Method	Round	Time	Notes
	Yunus Evloev	def.	Marat Ilaev	TKO (Punches)	1	0:00
	Alexander Emelianenko	def.	Silvio Santos	TKO (Punches)	1	1:34
	Akhmed Sultanov	def.	Katsuhisa Fujii	Submission (Armbar)	1	N/A
	Besiki Gerenava	def.	Yuji Sakuragi	Decision	2	5:00
	Yuta Watanabe	def.	Ansar Chalangov	Submission (Rear-Naked Choke)	1	N/A
	Ken Hamamura	def.	Islam Karimov	TKO (Punches)	2	N/A
	Daisuke Nakamura	def.	Yuri Ivlev	Decision (Majority)	2	5:00
	Roman Zentsov	def.	Daniel Tabera	Decision	2	5:00
	Viktor Nemkov	def.	Christian Bombay	Submission (Triangle Choke)	1	N/A
	Jarno Nurminen	def.	Ji-Hoon Kim	TKO (Corner Stoppage)	1	N/A
	Toni Valtonen	def.	Seung Hyun Choi	Submission (Rear-Naked Choke)	1	N/A
	Hyun Gyu Lim	def.	Lucio Linhares	KO (Punches)	1	0:17
	Janne Tulirinta	def.	Doo Won Seo	TKO (Punches)	2	N/A
	Niko Puhakka	def.	Jong Man Kim	Submission (Triangle Choke)	1	N/A
	Amar Suloev	def.	Jacek Buczko	TKO (Kick and Punches)	1	N/A

== M-1 MFC: Fedor Emelianenko Cup ==
M-1 MFC: Fedor Emelianenko Cup was an event held on May 15, 2008, in Russia.

=== Results ===
Main Card
Weight class				Method	Round	Time	Notes
	Dmitry Zabolotny	def.	Ricardo Wondel	N/A	0	0:00
	Vasily Krilov	def.	Lopez Owonyebe	N/A	0	0:00
	Vener Galiev	def.	Jaroslav Poborsky	TKO	1	0:00
	Maxim Kuptsov	def.	Samuel Judes	TKO	1	0:00
	Kirill Sidelnikov	def.	Carmelo Molina	TKO	1	0:00
	Daniel Tabera	def.	Mikhail Zayats	Submission (Rear Naked Choke)	0	0:00
	Radmir Gabdullin	def.	Jonathan Leon	Submission	1	0:00
	Juan Manuel Suarez	def.	Vladimir Vladimirov	N/A	1	0:00
	Mikhail Malyutin	def.	Carlos Valeri	Submission (Anaconda Choke)	1	0:00
	Igor Savelyev	def.	Silviu Vulc	Submission (Arm Triangle Choke)	1	0:00
	Viktor Nemkov	def.	Sergey Khramov	Decision	0	0:00
	Alexey Cherepovsky	def.	Maxim Rozhkov	Decision	0	0:00

== M-1 Challenge 3: Gran Canaria ==
M-1 Challenge 3: Gran Canaria was an event held on May 31, 2008, in San Agustin, Gran Canaria, Spain.

=== Results ===
Main Card
Weight class				Method	Round	Time	Notes
	Jessie Gibbs	def.	Carmelo Molina	Submission (Kimura)	1	3:30
	Daniel Tabera	def.	Kamil Uygun	TKO (Punches)	2	1:58
	Jonathan Leon	def.	Jason Jones	Decision (Unanimous)	2	5:00
	Juan Manuel Suarez	def.	Romano de los Reyes	Submission (Armbar)	1	4:17
	Bogdan Cristea	def.	Carlos Valeri	Submission (Guillotine Choke)	1	1:59
	Rayco Romero Silva	def.	Dani Estevez	Submission (Ankle Lock)	1	1:10
	Jarno Nurminen	def.	Mike Ottman	Submission (Rear Naked Choke)	1	1:15
	Rodney Wallace	def.	Toni Valtonen	Decision (Unanimous)	2	5:00
	Lucio Linhares	def.	Moyses Gabin	Submission (Armbar)	1	4:39
	Janne Tulirinta	def.	Roy McDonald	Submission (Triangle Choke)	1	4:36
	Niko Puhakka	def.	David Martinez	Submission (Kimura)	1	3:47

== M-1 Challenge 4: Battle on the Neva 2 ==
M-1 Challenge 4: Battle on the Neva 2 was an event held on June 27, 2008, at The Flying Dutchman in Saint Petersburg, Russia.

=== Results ===
Main Card
Weight class				Method	Round	Time	Notes
	Alexey Oleinik	def.	Alexander Timonov	Submission (Ezekiel Choke)	1	1:09
	Jarno Nurminen	def.	Kirill Sidelnikov	Decision (Unanimous)	2	5:00
	Mikhail Zayats	def.	Lucio Linhares	Decision (Unanimous)	2	5:00
	Dmitry Samoilov	def.	Niklas Winberg	Decision (Majority)	2	5:00
	Erik Oganov	def.	Janne Tulirinta	TKO (Punches to the Body)	2	0:56
	Mikhail Malyutin	def.	Niko Puhakka	Submission (Rear-Naked Choke)	2	3:16
	Rogent Lloret	def.	Akhmed Sultanov	Decision (Unanimous)	2	5:00
	Besiki Gerenava	def.	Rafael Rodriguez	Submission (Rear-Naked Choke)	1	4:10
	Ansar Chalangov	def.	Eulogio Fernandez	Submission (Toe Hold)	1	1:18
	Juan Manuel Suarez	def.	Islam Karimov	Decision (Unanimous)	2	5:00
	Yuri Ivlev	def.	Carlos Valeri	Submission (Armbar)	1	2:29
	Andrey Lisitsyn	def.	Artur Korchemny	Decision (Unanimous)	2	5:00

== M-1 Challenge 5: Japan ==
M-1 Challenge 5: Japan was an event held on July 17, 2008, at Shinjuku Face in Tokyo, Japan.

=== Results ===
Main Card
Weight class				Method	Round	Time	Notes
	Tatsuya Mizuno	def.	Yoshiyuki Nakanishi	KO (Punches)	1	4:13
	Jessie Gibbs	def.	Katsuhisa Fujii	TKO (Knees and Punches)	1	1:34
	Kamil Uygun	def.	Yuji Sakuragi	TKO (Knees and Punches)	1	4:52
	Jason Jones	def.	Yuta Watanabe	TKO (Punches)	2	2:03
	Romano de los Reyes	def.	Ken Hamamura	Decision (Majority)	2	5:00
	Daisuke Nakamura	def.	Bogdan Cristea	Decision (Unanimous)	2	5:00
	Yuki Ito	def.	Takaaki Aoki	Decision (Majority)	2	5:00
	Seigo Inoue	def.	Munehiro Kin	Decision (Majority)	2	5:00
	Malick N'diaye	def.	James Jack	Submission (Keylock)	1	3:54
	Christian M'Pumbu	def.	Barry Guerin	TKO (Punches)	1	0:32
	Karl Amoussou	def.	Mike Dolce	TKO (Kick to the Body)	2	0:41
	Jake Ellenberger	def.	Farouk Lakebir	Decision (Majority)	2	5:00
	David Gardner	def.	Samuel Judes	TKO (Punches)	1	3:16

== M-1 Challenge 6: Korea ==
M-1 Challenge 6: Korea was an event held on August 29, 2008, in South Korea.

=== Results ===
Main Card
Weight class				Method	Round	Time	Notes
	Sang Soo Lee	def.	Roman Zentsov	Submission (Triangle Choke)	1	4:33
	Min Suk Heo	def.	Radmir Gabdullin	Decision (Unanimous)	2	5:00
	Jeremiah Constant	def.	Ji-Hoon Kim	Submission (Kimura)	1	1:55
	Mu Jin Na	def.	Bryan Harper	KO (Punches)	1	0:42
	Hyun Gyu Lim	def.	Brandon Magana	Submission (Triangle Choke)	2	3:58
	Jake Ellenberger	def.	Doo Won Seo	TKO (Doctor Stoppage)	2	3:04
	David Gardner	def.	Jang Yong Kim	TKO (Punches)	1	0:59
	Won Sik Park	def.	Furdjel de Windt	Decision (Unanimous)	2	5:00
	Stefan Struve	def.	Yuji Sakuragi	Submission (Triangle Choke)	1	2:30
	Bruno Carvalho	def.	Tatsuya Mizuno	Decision (Unanimous)	2	5:00
	Jordan Radev	def.	Yuya Shirai	Decision (Majority)	2	5:00
	Norman Paraisy	def.	Hidehiko Hasegawa	Decision (Majority)	2	5:00
	Daisuke Nakamura	def.	Wim Deputter	Decision (Unanimous)	2	5:00

== M-1 Challenge 7: UK ==
M-1 Challenge 7: UK was an event held on September 27, 2008, at The Harvey Hadden Stadium in Nottingham, England.

=== Results ===
Main Card
Weight class				Method	Round	Time	Notes
	Matteo Minonzio	def.	Wayne Buck	Submission (Strikes)	1	1:51
	Jim Wallhead	def.	Igor Araujo	TKO (Punches)	1	1:19
	Kirill Sidelnikov	def.	James Jack	TKO (Punches)	1	1:28
	Mikhail Zayats	def.	John Cornett	Submission (Hand Injury)	2	0:44
	Dmitry Samoilov	def.	Bryan Harper	Decision (Majority)	2	5:00
	Erik Oganov	def.	Brandon Magana	Decision (Majority)	2	5:00
	Mikhail Malyutin	def.	Beau King	Submission (Rear Naked Choke)	1	4:59
	Christian Smith	def.	Clifford Hall	TKO (Punches)	2	0:33
	Akhmed Sultanov	def.	Sylwester Oleksy	Decision (Unanimous)	2	5:00
	Gadzhimurad Omarov	def.	Nills van Noord	Decision (Unanimous)	3	5:00
	Sergey Kornev	def.	Rosen Dimitrov	TKO (Punches)	1	2:59
	Jason Ponet	def.	Sergey Verdesh	Decision (Unanimous)	2	5:00
	Musa Khamanaev	def.	Wim Deputter	Decision (Majority)	2	5:00

== M-1 Challenge 8: USA ==
M-1 Challenge 8: USA was an event held on October 29, 2008, at The Harrah's Casino in Kansas City, Missouri, United States.

=== Results ===
Main Card
Weight class				Method	Round	Time	Notes
	Mike Whitehead	def.	Leo Pla	Submission (Guillotine Choke)	1	1:20
	Bobby Voelker	def.	Amir Rahnavardi	Decision (Unanimous)	3	5:00
	Sang Soo Lee	def.	Malick N'diaye	Submission (Armbar)	1	4:58
	Eun-Su Lee	def.	Karl Louis Jean	TKO (Corner Stoppage)	2	4:22
	Karl Amoussou	def.	Min Suk Heo	Decision (Split)	3	5:00
	Do Hyung Kim	def.	Farouk Lakebir	Decision (Unanimous)	3	5:00
	Makhtar Gueye	def.	Se Young Kim	KO (Punches to the Body)	1	1:02
	Rogent Lloret	def.	Yuji Sakuragi	Decision (Unanimous)	2	5:00
	Tatsuya Mizuno	def.	Jose Beltran Martinez	TKO (Punches)	1	1:53
	Yuya Shirai	def.	Rafael Rodriguez	Submission (Kimura)	1	2:16
	Hidehiko Hasegawa	def.	Javier Martinez	Decision (Unanimous)	3	5:00
	Daisuke Nakamura	def.	Carlos Valeri	Submission (Flying Armbar)	1	0:26

== M-1: Staredown 2 ==
M-1: Staredown 2 was an event held on November 16, 2008, in Germany.

=== Results ===
Main Card
Weight class				Method	Round	Time	Notes
	Tommy Depret	def.	Cengiz Dana	TKO (Punches)	2	4:28
	Raymond Jarman	def.	Fatih Dogan	Decision (Unanimous)	2	5:00
	Kurt Verschueren	def.	Hartwich Owen	TKO (Punches)	1	0:00

== M-1 Challenge 9: Russia ==
M-1 Challenge 9: Russia was an event held on November 21, 2008, at The Ice Palace Saint Petersburg in Saint Petersburg, Russia.

=== Results ===
Main Card
Weight class				Method	Round	Time	Notes
	Alexander Emelianenko	def.	Sang Soo Lee	TKO (Punches)	1	2:40
	Kirill Sidelnikov	def.	Jong Wang Kim	TKO (Corner Stoppage)	1	0:12
	Mikhail Zayats	def.	Seung-Bae Whi	Decision (Majority)	2	5:00
	Dmitry Samoilov	def.	Min Suk Heo	TKO (Punches)	2	2:28
	Do Hyung Kim	def.	Erik Oganov	Submission (Rear-Naked Choke)	2	0:57
	Mikhail Malyutin	def.	Yui Chul Nam	Decision (Majority)	2	5:00
	Gilbert Yvel	def.	Alexander Timonov	TKO (Punches)	1	0:22
	Jessie Gibbs	def.	Akhmed Sultanov	Submission (Arm-Triangle Choke)	1	1:12
	Besiki Gerenava	def.	Kamil Uygun	Decision (Majority)	3	5:00
	Ansar Chalangov	def.	Jason Jones	Submission (Heel Hook)	2	1:28
	Magomed Shikshabekov	def.	Romano de los Reyes	Submission (Triangle Choke)	1	0:58
	Bogdan Cristea	def.	Musa Khamanaev	Submission (Triangle Choke)	1	1:21
	Igor Gerus	def.	Alexander Volkov	TKO (Punches)	1	3:24
	Kirill Sukhomlinov	def.	Alexei Nazarov	Submission (Triangle Choke)	1	2:25

== M-1 Challenge 10: Finland ==
M-1 Challenge 10: Finland was an event held on November 26, 2008, at The Töölö Sports Hall in Helsinki, Finland.

=== Results ===
Main Card
Weight class				Method	Round	Time	Notes
	Victor Valimaki	def.	Rodney Glunder	Submission (Rear-Naked Choke)	1	2:14
	Toni Valtonen	def.	Mousa Niangane	Submission (Armbar)	1	2:00
	Christian M'Pumbu	def.	Marcus Vanttinen	Submission (Rear-Naked Choke)	1	2:15
	Lucio Linhares	def.	Karl Amoussou	TKO (Punches)	1	4:52
	Janne Tulirinta	def.	Farouk Lakebir	TKO (Shoulder Injury)	1	2:23
	Niko Puhakka	def.	Makhtar Gueye	Decision (Unanimous)	3	5:00
	Mathias Klockars	def.	Jordy Peute	Decision (Unanimous)	3	5:00
	Rogent Lloret	def.	Michal Kita	Submission (Armbar)	1	2:09
	Enoc Solves Torres	def.	Valdas Pocevicius	Decision (Unanimous)	2	5:00
	Jordan Radev	def.	Rafael Rodriguez	Technical Submission (Rear-Naked Choke)	1	1:08
	Jose Beltran Martinez	def.	Jason Ponet	Submission (Toe Hold)	1	3:32
	Juha-Pekka Vainikainen	def.	Jose Luis Zapater	KO (Punch)	1	1:57
	Janne Elonen-Kulmala	def.	Nicklas Bergman	KO (Punches)	2	0:20

== See also ==
- M-1 Global
