= Alexander Sarnavskiy =

Russian martial artist

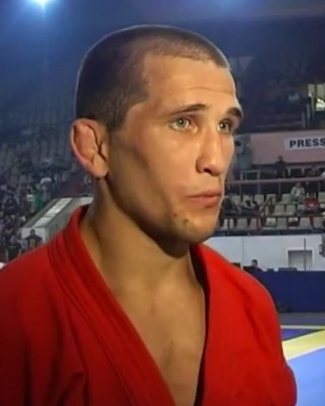
- Sarnavsky in 2012
- Born: January 17, 1989 (age 37); Omsk, Russian SFSR, Soviet Union
- Other names: Tiger
- Height: 5 ft 11 in (1.80 m)
- Weight: 155 lb (70 kg; 11.1 st)
- Division: Lightweight
- Reach: 70.5 in (179 cm)
- Style: Kickboxing, Hand-to-hand combat
- Fighting out of: Lake Forest, California, U.S
- Team: RusFighters Sport Club; Reign Training Center; BJ Penn's MMA; Storm Fight School
- Trainer: Alexander Shlemenko
- Rank: Master of Sport in HTHC
- Years active: 2008–present

Mixed martial arts record
- Total: 54
- Wins: 45
- By knockout: 13
- By submission: 23
- By decision: 9
- Losses: 9
- By knockout: 1
- By submission: 2
- By decision: 6

Other information
- Mixed martial arts record from Sherdog

Alexander Sarnavskiy (Russian: Александр Сарнавский, born January 17, 1989) is a Russian mixed martial artist who competes in the lightweight division. A professional MMA competitor since 2008, Sarnavskiy has mostly competed in his native Russia, where he is an M-1 Global veteran and former lightweight division in the Bellator Fighting Championships.

== Mixed martial arts career ==
=== Background ===
Alexander Sarnavsky was born in 1989 in the village. Gorky (Kazakhstan). In 1998 he moved with his family to Omsk, where his sports career began. The first discipline was kickboxing, which the young man mastered for 2 years at the Lokomotiv club and achieved success in regional competitions. Later, he was attracted by pankration and Alexander switched to hand-to-hand combat and combat sambo at the Saturn-Profi martial arts school. Hobbies grew into a professional approach at the age of 18, when Sarnavsky decided to try his hand at mixed martial arts. He was led to this step by the example of a coach, Alexander Shlemenko.

=== M-1 Global ===
After compiling a record of 8–0 (3 submission, 4 KO/TKOs), Sarnavskiy joined M-1 Global to enter their selection tournament. His opening round fight was against Maxim Kuptsov. Midway through the first round, Sarnavskiy caught his opponent in a body triangle and peppered him with punches from behind. He soon went for a rear naked choke, which forced the tapout from Kuptsov.

Sarnavskiy then faced Karen Grigoryan in the next round, defeating him by split decision, advancing him to the final.

Following the win over Grigoryan, Sherdog ranked him as the number one undefeated European prospect in the sport. Around the same time, Sarnavskiy was scheduled to face Artiom Damkovsky at the M-1 Eastern European Finals. The bout was cancelled however and Damkovsky faced a replacement opponent in the final.

Appearing at M-1 Challenge XXI: Guram vs. Garner, Sarnavskiy faced Victor Kuku. Immediately, Sarnavskiy went after Kuku and went for a flying knee. Sarnavskiy's spinning back fist knocked Kuku down, before he hit Kuku with a barrage of punches to claim the knockout win.

Sarnavskiy made his U.S. MMA debut in Norfolk, Virginia on March 25, 2011, on the televised portion of M-1 Challenge: Damkovsky vs. Figueroa. He faced late replacement Beau Baker and won the fight via submission in the second round.

=== Bellator MMA ===
On June 19, 2012, Sarnavskiy signed with Bellator, thus terminating the contract with M-1 Global.

Sarnavskiy entered as a participant in the Bellator season seven lightweight tournament. In the opening round, he faced Rich Clementi on October 19, 2012, at Bellator 77. He lost the fight via split decision (29–28, 28–29, 30–26).

Sarnavskiy defeated Tony Hervey on November 30, 2012, at Bellator 82 via unanimous decision (30–27, 30–27, 30–27).

In 2013, Sarnavskiy entered as a participant in the Bellator Season 8 Lightweight tournament. He faced Brazilian Kickboxer Thiago Michel in the quarter-finals on January 31, 2013, at Bellator 87 and won via submission in the second round.

Sarnavskiy was originally scheduled to face David Rickels in the semifinals. However, Sarnavskiy fractured his hand during his first fight and had to withdraw from the tournament.

In the fall of 2013, Sarnavskiy entered the next Lightweight tournament. He faced Marcus Davis on September 27, 2013, at Bellator 101 in the quarterfinals of Bellator's Season Nine Lightweight Tournament. After knocking Davis down with a punch, he took his back and eventually won via a rear naked choke submission.

Sarnavskiy faced Ricardo Tirloni in the semifinals and won via triangle choke in the first round.

Sarnavskiy faced Will Brooks in the finals and lost via unanimous decision.

After nearly a year away from the Bellator cage, Sarnavskiy was expected to face John Gunderson on October 10, 2014, at Bellator 128. However, Gunderson withdrew from the bout and retired from MMA fighting. Derek Campos stepped in as a replacement. An injury forced Campos out of the fight, Sarnavskiy eventually faced promotional newcomer Dakota Cochrane. He won the fight by submission in the first round.

Sarnavskiy faced Marcin Held on April 10, 2015, at Bellator 136. He lost the fight via verbal submission in the third round and was subsequently released from the promotion.

=== Post-Bellator MMA ===
Sarnavskiy faced Jesse Ronson on October 3, 2015, at Abu Dhabi Warriors 3. He won via unanimous decision.

=== Eurasia Fight Nights Global (EFN) ===
Sarnavskiy faced Murad Machaev on February 26, 2016, at Fight Nights: Battle of Moscow 21. He lost the fight via unanimous decision.

Sarnavskiy faced Dmitry Bikrev on April 29, 2016, at Fight Nights Global 46. He won the fight via submission in the second round.

=== Absolute Championship Berkut ===
Sarnavskiy faced Ustarmagomed Gadzhidaudov on September 17, 2016, at ACB 45: Silva vs. Magomedsharipov. He lost the fight by knockout in the second round.

Sarnavskiy faced Ramazan Esenbaev on December 18, 2016, at ACB 50: Rasulov vs. Goltsov. He won thefight via TKO in the third round.

Sarnavskiy faced Eduard Vartanyan on April 15, 2017, at ACB 57: Payback. He lost the fight via submission in the second round.

Sarnavskiy faced Shamil Nikaev at ACB 80 on February 16, 2018. He lost the bout via split decision.

Bouncing back from the loss, Sarnavskiy knocked out Herdeson Batista on November 10, 2018, at ACB 90.

Sarnavskiy faced Aurel Pirtea on December 14, 2019, at ACA 103. He won the bout, knocking out Aurel in the third round.

In the title fight at ACA 111 on September 29, 2020, for the ACA Lightweight Championship, he lost to the champion Abdul-Aziz Abdulvakhabov by unanimous decision, breaking his arm during the bout.

In his first bout post recovery and title bout loss, Sarnavskiy faced Artem Damkovskiy at ACA 118 on February 26, 2021. He won the bout via rear-naked choke at the end of the first round.

Sarnavskiy faced Rashid Magomedov on September 24, 2021, at ACA 129: Sarnavskiy vs. Magomedov. He won the close bout via split decision.

Sarnavskiy faced Herdeson Batista on May 21, 2022, at ACA 139. He won the bout via TKO stoppage under a minute into the bout.

=== Post ACA ===
Sarnavskiy faced Magomed Sulumov on February 23, 2024, at AMC Fight Nights 123 for the AMC Lightweight Championship, despite being hurt in the first round, Sarnavskiy came back to win the title and the bout via rear-naked choke in the third round.

== Championships and accomplishments ==
- M-1 Global
  - М-1 Selection Eastern Europe Championship 2010.
- Bellator Fighting Championships
  - Bellator Season 9 Lightweight Tournament Runner-up

== Mixed martial arts record ==
Professional record breakdown
54 matches	45 wins	9 losses
By knockout	13	1
By submission	23	2
By decision	9	6

Res.	Record	Opponent	Method	Event	Date	Round	Time	Location	Notes
Win	45–9	Babuli Tsoloev	TKO (knees and punches)	BetCity Fight Nights 144	November 4, 2026	3	1:56	Saint Petersburg, Russia	Defended the FNG Welterweight Championship.
Win	44–9	Dmitry Bikrev	Submission (rear-naked choke)	BetCity Fight Nights 132	December 20, 2025	1	4:34	Moscow, Russia	Return to Welterweight. Won the FNG Welterweight Championship.
Win	43–9	Akhmed Aliev	Technical Submission (rear-naked choke)	BetCity Fight Nights 128	September 14, 2025	3	2:32	Nevinnomyssk, Russia	
Win	42–9	Adriano Martins	Decision (unanimous)	BetCity Fight Nights 126	February 21, 2025	3	5:00	Sochi, Russia	
Loss	41–9	Akhmed Aliev	Decision (unanimous)	AMC Fight Nights 125	October 18, 2024	5	5:00	Sochi, Russia	Lost the AMC Lightweight Championship.
Win	41–8	Magomed Sulumov	Submission (rear-naked choke)	AMC Fight Nights 123	February 23, 2024	3	4:32	Moscow, Russia	Won the AMC Lightweight Championship.
Win	40–8	Herdeson Batista	TKO (punches)	ACA 139	May 21, 2022	1	0:42	Moscow, Russia	
Win	39–8	Rashid Magomedov	Decision (split)	ACA 129	September 24, 2021	5	5:00	Moscow, Russia	
Win	38–8	Artem Damkovskiy	Submission (rear-naked choke)	ACA 118	February 26, 2021	1	4:55	Moscow, Russia	
Loss	37–8	Abdul-Aziz Abdulvakhabov	Decision (unanimous)	ACA 111	September 19, 2020	5	5:00	Moscow, Russia	For the vacant ACA Lightweight Championship.
Win	37–7	Aurel Pirtea	KO (punch)	ACA 103	December 14, 2019	3	0:39	Saint Petersburg, Russia	
Win	36–7	Herdeson Batista	KO (knee)	ACB 90	November 10, 2018	1	2:11	Moscow, Russia	
Loss	35–7	Shamil Nikaev	Decision (split)	ACB 80	February 16, 2018	3	5:00	Krasnodar, Russia	
Loss	35–6	Eduard Vartanyan	Technical Submission (rear-naked choke)	ACB 57	April 15, 2017	2	4:47	Moscow, Russia	
Win	35–5	Ramazan Esenbaev	TKO (corner stoppage)	ACB 50	December 18, 2016	3	3:49	Saint Petersburg, Russia	
Loss	34–5	Ustarmagomed Gadzhidaudov	KO (punch)	ACB 45	September 17, 2016	2	4:19	Saint Petersburg, Russia	
Win	34–4	Jorge Patino	Decision (unanimous)	Abu Dhabi Warriors 4	May 24, 2016	3	5:00	Abu Dhabi, United Arab Emirates	
Win	33–4	Dmitry Bikrev	Submission (rear-naked choke)	Fight Nights Global 46	April 29, 2016	2	2:35	Moscow, Russia	Catchweight (161 lb) bout.
Loss	32–4	Murad Machaev	Decision (unanimous)	Fight Nights Global 44	February 26, 2016	3	5:00	Moscow, Russia	
Win	32–3	Leandro Rodrigues Pontes	KO (punch)	FEFoMP: International Tournament in Pankration	November 28, 2015	1	1:58	Vladivostok, Russia	
Win	31–3	Jesse Ronson	Decision (unanimous)	Abu Dhabi Warriors 3	October 3, 2015	3	5:00	Abu Dhabi, United Arab Emirates	
Loss	30–3	Marcin Held	Submission (kneebar)	Bellator 136	April 10, 2015	3	1:11	Irvine, California, United States	
Win	30–2	Artak Nazaryan	KO (flying knee)	Union of Veterans: Cup of Friendship 2014	November 8, 2014	1	4:09	Novosibirsk, Russia	
Win	29–2	Dakota Cochrane	Submission (rear-naked choke)	Bellator 128	October 10, 2014	1	2:32	Thackerville, Oklahoma, United States	Catchweight (160 lb) bout.
Win	28–2	Drew Brokenshire	Submission (rear-naked choke)	S-70: Plotforma Cup 2014	August 9, 2014	2	4:08	Sochi, Russia	
Win	27–2	Yukinari Tamura	Submission (rear-naked choke)	Ural Fight League: Resurrection	May 24, 2014	3	4:54	Yekaterinburg, Russia	
Win	26–2	Alexander Butenko	Decision (unanimous)	Union of Veterans: Cup of Champions 2013	December 21, 2013	3	5:00	Novosibirsk, Russia	
Loss	25–2	Will Brooks	Decision (unanimous)	Bellator 109	November 22, 2013	3	5:00	Bethlehem, Pennsylvania, United States	Bellator Season 9 Lightweight Tournament Final.
Win	25–1	Ricardo Tirloni	Submission (triangle choke)	Bellator 105	October 25, 2013	1	1:08	Rio Rancho, New Mexico, United States	Bellator Season 9 Lightweight Tournament Semifinal.
Win	24–1	Marcus Davis	Submission (rear-naked choke)	Bellator 101	September 27, 2013	1	1:40	Portland, Oregon, United States	Bellator Season 9 Lightweight Tournament Quarterfinal.
Win	23–1	Atchin Chaoshen Ne	Submission (armbar)	FEFoMP: Mayor Cup 2013	May 25, 2013	1	1:35	Khabarovsk, Russia	
Win	22–1	Thiago Michel	Submission (rear-naked choke)	Bellator 87	January 31, 2013	2	3:43	Mount Pleasant, Michigan, United States	Bellator Season 8 Lightweight Tournament Quarterfinal.
Win	21–1	Tony Hervey	Decision (unanimous)	Bellator 82	November 30, 2012	3	5:00	Mount Pleasant, Michigan, United States	
Loss	20–1	Rich Clementi	Decision (split)	Bellator 77	October 19, 2012	3	5:00	Reading, Pennsylvania, United States	Bellator Season 7 Lightweight Tournament Quarterfinal.
Win	20–0	Maykel Becerra	KO (knee)	FEFoMP: Mayor Cup 2012	May 26, 2012	1	1:24	Khabarovsk, Russia	
Win	19–0	Len Bentley	Submission (triangle choke)	Vladimir Zborovskiy Memorial 2012	February 11, 2012	1	1:50	Omsk, Russia	Welterweight bout.
Win	18–0	Sergio Cortez	Submission (rear-naked choke)	M-1 Challenge 30	December 9, 2011	1	1:46	Costa Mesa, California, United States	Catchweight (159 lb) bout.
Win	17–0	Thomáš Deák	Decision (unanimous)	Union of Veterans: Cup of Champions 2011	November 19, 2011	2	5:00	Novosibirsk, Russia	
Win	16–0	Marcio Cesar	Submission (rear-naked choke)	League S-70: Russia vs. Brazil	August 5, 2011	1	1:04	Sochi, Russia	
Win	15–0	Doug Evans	Submission (triangle choke)	FEFoMP: Mayor's Cup 2011	May 7, 2011	1	2:40	Khabarovsk, Russia	
Win	14–0	Beau Baker	Submission (rear-naked choke)	M-1 Challenge 24	March 25, 2011	2	2:32	Norfolk, Virginia, United States	
Win	13–0	Arsen Ubaidulaev	Submission (rear-naked choke)	M-1 Challenge 22	December 10, 2010	1	0:43	Moscow, Russia	
Win	12–0	Victor Kuku	TKO (spinning back fist and punches)	M-1 Challenge 21	October 28, 2010	1	0:14	Saint Petersburg, Russia	
Win	11–0	Aleksey Ershik	Submission (rear-naked choke)	FEFoMP: Cup of Vladivostok 2010	October 23, 2010	1	0:30	Vladivostok, Russia	
Win	10–0	Karen Grigoryan	Decision (split)	M-1 Selection 2010: Eastern Europe Round 3	May 28, 2010	3	5:00	Kyiv, Ukraine	2010 M-1 Selection Lightweight Tournament Semifinal.
Win	9–0	Maxim Kuptsov	Submission (rear-naked choke)	M-1 Selection 2010: Eastern Europe Round 1	February 26, 2010	1	4:03	Saint Petersburg, Russia	Return to Lightweight. 2010 M-1 Selection Lightweight Tournament Quarterfinal.
Win	8–0	Mamour Fall	Submission (triangle choke)	Saturn & RusFighters: Battle of Gladiators 2010	February 13, 2010	2	1:50	Omsk, Russia	Won the Battle of Gladiators Welterweight Tournament.
Win	7–0	Timur Daurenuly	KO (punches)	Saturn & RusFighters: Battle of Gladiators 2010	February 13, 2010	1	0:35	Omsk, Russia	Welterweight debut. Battle of Gladiators Welterweight Tournament Semifinal.
Win	6–0	Maratbek Kalabekov	Decision (split)	ProFC: Union Nation Cup 4	December 19, 2009	3	3:00	Rostov-on-Don, Russia	
Win	5–0	Vladimir Simonyan	KO (punches)	ProFC: Union Nation Cup 3	October 30, 2009	1	0:17	Rostov-on-Don, Russia	
Win	4–0	Kardash Fatakhov	TKO (punches)	Siberian League: Tomsk Challenge	July 2, 2009	1	8:40	Tomsk, Russia	Won the Siberian League Lightweight Tournament.
Win	3–0	Islam Mamedov	KO (punches)	Siberian League: Tomsk Challenge	July 2, 2009	1	5:34	Tomsk, Russia	Siberian League Lightweight Tournament Semifinal.
Win	2–0	Andrei Koshkin	Submission (triangle choke)	Siberian League: New Hopes	April 27, 2009	1	2:15	Novokuznetsk, Russia	
Win	1–0	Rishat Gilmitdinov	Submission (triangle choke)	Universal Fighter	December 12, 2008	1	2:00	Ufa, Russia	Lightweight debut.

== See also ==
- List of male mixed martial artists
- List of current Bellator fighters
