= Miodrag Petković =

Serbian mathematician and computer scientist (born 1948)

Miodrag S. Petković
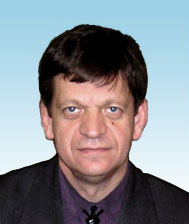
- Born: February 10, 1948 (age 78); Niš, Serbia
- Education: University of Nis
- Occupation: Mathematician
- Known for: Interval mathematics, Solving nonlinear equations, Polynomial roots, Recreational mathematics

Miodrag S. Petković (born 10 February 1948 in Niš, Serbia in the former Yugoslavia) is a mathematician and computer scientist. In 1991 he became a full professor of mathematics at the Faculty of Electronic Engineering, University of Niš in Serbia.

== Biography ==
Petković specializes in the theory of iterative processes for solving nonlinear equations and Interval mathematics. He wrote 270 academic papers (153 in Clarivate Analytics' SCI journals) and 28 books, including four monographs Iterative Methods for Simultaneous Inclusion of Polynomial Zeros (Springer-Verlag 1989), Complex Interval Arithmetic and Its Applications (Wiley-VCH 1998), Point Estimation of Root Finding Methods (Springer-Verlag 2008), and Multipoint Methods for Solving Nonlinear Equations (Elsevier 2013). Petković papers were cited 1193 times with Hirsch index h=20, while Elsevier's Reference Manager Mendeley displays 1565 citations and h=21.

He was visiting professor at the University of Oldenburg from 1989 to 2001, the Louis Pasteur University, Strasbourg (France, 1992), the University of Tsukuba (Japan, 2001), and a scientific researcher/invited lecturer at Columbia University, Harvard University, and at the universities of Freiburg, Zurich (ETH), Oldenburg, Berlin (Humboldt University), London, Sofia, Kiel, Tokyo, Tsukuba, Nagoya and Vienna. He took part at 60 conferences and congresses, and he was the invited lecturer on two world's congresses in 1992 and 1996, and several international conferences. He was a co-organizer of the international conference at the University of Kiel (Germany) 1998.

Petković is an Associate Editor in Journal of Computational and Applied Mathematics and Applied Mathematics and Computation and a member of editorial board of Reliable Computing, Journal of Applied Mathematics, Journal of Mathematics and Computing Systems, Journal of Complex Analysis, Mathematical Aeterna, and Novi Sad J. Math.

Petković is a member of the Serbian Scientific Society, New York Academy of Science, American Mathematical Society, GAMM, and was a member of the Serbian National Council of Science from 2010 to 2015.

== Publications ==
Publications include:

- Iterative Methods for Simultaneous Inclusion of Polynomial Zeros. Lecture Notes in Mathematics. Vol. 1387. Springer-Verlag. 1989. ISBN 978-3-540-51485-5.
- Mathematics and Chess. Dover Publications. 1997. ISBN 0-486-29432-3. (a collection of 110 problems in algebra, geometry, and combinatorics based on the rules of the chess game – part of this book can be read on Google books)
- Point Estimation of Root Finding Methods. Lecture Notes in Mathematics. Vol. 1933. Springer-Verlag. 2008. ISBN 978-3-540-77850-9.
- Famous puzzles of great mathematicians. Providence, R.I. : American Mathematical Society. 2009. ISBN 978-0-8218-4814-2.
- Complex interval arithmetic and its applications. Wiley-VCH. 1998. ISBN 3-527-40134-2. (preview readable on Google books)
- Multipoint Methods for Solving Nonlinear Equations. Elsevier/Academic Press. 2013. ISBN 978-0-12-397013-8.
