= M-1 Selection =

Mixed martial arts events

M-1 Selection is series of mixed martial arts competitions held by M-1 Global

Fighters are eliminated after only one loss; victory will advance the winning fighters throughout the tournament to the championship event where they will compete for a “M-1 Selection” title.

== M-1 Selection # 1 (2009 Season) ==
Event	Date	Location	Schedule
M-1 Selection 1	13.03.2009	St.Petersburg, Russia	Team Red Devil (St.Petersburg) vs Team Anapa (5:0) Team Dagestan vs Team Action Force (St.Petersburg) (4:1)
M-1 Selection 2	04.19.2009	St.Petersburg, Russia	Team Crazy Bears vs Team Sochi Star (2:3) Team Rus Fighters vs Team Legion (1:4); Team Action Force vs Team Combat Bears (3:2)
M-1 Selection 3	28.05.2009	St.Petersburg, Russia	Team Red Devil vs Team Crazy Bears (5:0) Team Rus Fighters vs Team Action Force (2:3); Team Mockva vs Team Anapa (2:3)
M-1 Selection 4	23.06.2009	St.Petersburg, Russia	Team Sochi Star vs Team Anapa (1:4) Team Comba Bears vs Team Legion (0:5)
M-1 Selection 5	21.07.2009	St.Petersburg, Russia	Team Dagestan vs Team Rus Fighters (4:1) Team Moscow vs Team Crazy Bears (3:2)
M-1 Selection 6	05.09.2009	Makhachkala, Russia	Team Red Devil vs Team Sochi Star (4:1) Team Legion vs Team Dagestan (2:3)
M-1 Selection 7	03.10.2009	Moscow, Russia	Team Rus Fighters vs Team Combat Bears (2:3) Team Anapa vs Team Crazy Bears (5:0)
M-1 Selection 8	04.10.2009	Moscow, Russia	Team Moscow vs Team Red Devil (3:2) Team Action Force vs Team Legion (4:1)
M-1 Selection 9	13.11.2009	St.Petersburg, Russia	Team Sochi Star vs Team Moscow (2:3) Team Combat Bears vs Team Dagestan (2:3)
M-1 Selection 10 (Final)	03.12.2009	St.Petersburg, Russia	Team Red Devil vs Team Dagestan (2:3)

== M-1 Selection Ukraine # 1 (2009 Season) ==
Event	Date	Schedule
M-1 Selection! 2009 Ukraine Qualifying Match 1	15.06.2009	Team BC "Tez-Tour-Fight" (Kiev-Kharkiv) vs Team IC "Bars" (Kryvyi Rih) (3:2) Team RFP (Lviv) vs Team BC "Octopus" (Odessa) (4:1)
M-1 Selection! 2009 Ukraine Qualifying Match 2	04.07.2009	Team BC "arhat" (simferopol) vs Team KCS "Makfight.ua" (Kiev Region, Makarov) (0:5) Tem PBK "Faytzona" (Donetsk) vs Team SK Sokol (Chermigov) (2:3)
M-1 Selection! 2009 Ukraine 1st Round	20.09.2009	Team PBK "Faytzona" (Donetsk) vs Team KCS "Makfight.ua" (Kiev Region, Makarov) (1:4) Team RFP (Lviv) vs Team IC "Bars" (Kryvyi Rih) (5:0)
M-1 Selection! 2009 Ukraine 2nd Round	19.11.2009	Team SK Sokol (Chermigov) vs Team PBK "Faytzona" (Donetsk) (3:2) Team BC "Tez-Tour-Fight" (Kiev-Kharkiv) vs Team IC "Bars" (Kryvyi Rih) (5:0)
M-1 Selection! 2009 Ukraine Semi Final	29.11.2009	Team SK Sokol (Chermigov) vs Team KCS "Makfight.ua" (Kiev Region, Makarov) (1:4) Team BC "Tez-Tour-Fight" (Kiev-Kharkiv) vs Team RFP (Lviv) (2:3)
M-1 Selection! 2009 Ukraine Final	24.12.2009	Team SK Sokol (Chermigov) vs Team BC "Tez-Tour-Fight" (Kiev-Kharkiv) (4:1) Team KCS "Makfight.ua" (Kiev Region, Makarov) vs Team RFP (Lviv) (3:2)

== M-1 Selection # 2 (2010 Season) ==
- M-1 Selection! 2010 Eastern Europe 1st Round
- M-1 Selection! 2010 Asia 1st Round
- M-1 Selection! 2010 Western Europe 1st Round
- M-1 Selection! 2010 Western Europe 2nd Round
- M-1 Selection! 2010 Americas 1st Round
- M-1 Selection! 2010 Eastern Europe 2nd Round
- M-1 Selection! 2010 Asia 2nd Round
- M-1 Selection! 2010 Eastern Europe 3rd Round (Semi Final)
- M-1 Selection! 2010 Western Europe 3rd Round (Semi Final)
- M-1 Selection! 2010 Americas 2nd Round
- M-1 Selection! 2010 Asia Final Episode I
- M-1 Selection! 2010 Asia Final Episode II
- M-1 Selection! 2010 Eastern Europe Final & Western Europe Final
- M-1 Selection! 2010 Asia 3rd Round (Semi Final)
- M-1 Selection! 2010 Asia Final

== M-1 Selection Ukraine # 2 (2010 Season) ==
Event	Date	Schedule
M-1 Selection! 2010 Ukraine 1st Round	29.04.2010	Team BC "Tornado" (Simferopol) vs Team MBC "Tez Tour Fight" (Kiev-Kharkiv) (0:5) Team RFP "Brock" (Lviv) vs Team SC "ARIS" (Donetsk) (3:2)
M-1 Selection! 2010 Ukraine 2nd Round	07.05.2010	Team UK "Good" (Kiev Sumy) vs Team BC "Knight" (Kryvyi Rih) (4:1) Team KCS "Makfight.ua" (Kiev Region) vs Team TSRE "Maksfayt" (Belarus) (4:1)
M-1 Selection! 2010 Ukraine 3rd Round	28.05.2010	Team BC "Tornado" (Simferopol) vs Team SC "ARIS" (Donetsk) (1:4)
M-1 Selection! 2010 Ukraine 4th Round	18.09.2010	Team KCS "Makfight.ua" (Kiev Region) vs Team BC "Knight" (Kryvyi Rih) (5:0) Team MBC "Tez Tour Fight" (Kiev-Kharkiv) vs Team RFP "Brock" (Lviv) (3:2); Team UK "Good" (Kiev Sumy) vs Team TSRE "Maksfayt" (Belarus) (5:0)
M-1 Selection! 2010 Ukraine 5th Round	24.10.2010	Team TSRE "Maksfayt" (Belarus) vs Team BC "Knight" (Kryvyi Rih) (4:1) Team MBC "Tez Tour Fight" (Kiev-Kharkiv) vs SC "ARIS" (Donetsk) (1:4)
M-1 Selection! 2010 Ukraine 6th Round (Semi Final)	06.11.2010	Team KCS "Makfight.ua" (Kiev Region) vs Team UK "Good" (Kiev Sumy) (0:5) Team BC "Tornado" (Simferopol) vs Team RFP (Lviv) (5:0)
M-1 Selection! 2010 Ukraine Final	24.12.2009	Team MBC "Tez Tour Fight" (Kiev-Kharkiv) vs Team KCS "Makfight.ua" (Kiev Region) (1:4) Team UK "Good" (Kiev Sumy) vs Team SC "ARIS" (Donetsk) (4:1)

== M-1 Selection # 3 (2011 Season) ==
Event	Date	Schedule
M-1 Selection! 2011 Asia 1st Round	26.03.2011	Team Korea vs Team Japan
M-1 Selection! 2011 Europe 1st Round	01.04.2011	Team Eastern Europe vs Team Western Europe
