= Mikhail Zayats =

Russian mixed martial arts fighter

- Born: October 14, 1981 (age 45); Karachev, Russian SFSR, Soviet Union
- Native name: Михаил Заяц
- Nationality: Russian
- Height: 5 ft 11 in (180 cm)
- Weight: 185 lb (84 kg; 13 st 3 lb)
- Division: Light Heavyweight; Middleweight
- Reach: 74 in (188 cm)
- Fighting out of: Bryansk, Bryansk Oblast, Russia; St. Petersburg, Leningrad Oblast, Russia
- Team: Red Devil Sport Club; RusFighters Sport Club (Saturn.Profi); Alliance Gym; RusFighters Sport Club (USA)
- Trainer: Andrey Kochergin
- Rank: Master of Sports in Combat Sambo; Master of Sports in Hand-to-hand combat Black belt in Ju-Jitsu; Blue Belt in Brazilian Jiu-Jitsu
- Years active: 2006-2018

Mixed martial arts record
- Total: 32
- Wins: 24
- By knockout: 4
- By submission: 12
- By decision: 8
- Losses: 8
- By knockout: 3
- By submission: 2
- By decision: 3

Other information
- Mixed martial arts record from Sherdog

Mikhail Zayats
Medal record

Representing Russia

Men's Combat Sambo

World Championships
Gold medal – first place	2008 St. Petersburg	-90 kg

Mikhail Vladimirovich Zayats (Russian: Михаил Владимирович Заяц;born October 14, 1981) is a Russian former professional mixed martial artist who competed in Bellator's Light Heavyweight division as well as M-1 Global.

== Mixed martial arts career ==
=== M-1 Global ===
Mikhail Zayats defeated powerful Georgian wrestler David Tkeshelashvili by rear-naked choke submission at 2:26 in the first round.

Zayats faced Malik Merad on April 28, 2011, at М-1 Challenge XXV: Zavurov vs. Enomoto. He won via TKO (punches) in the second round.

Zayats faced Vinny Magalhães on October 14, 2011, at М-1 Challenge XXVII: Garner vs. Grishin for the M-1 Global Light Heavyweight Championship. He lost via TKO (head kick and punches) in the third round.

=== Bellator MMA ===
Zayats was signed in Bellator and will perform on Bellator Fighting Championships: Season Eight Light Heavyweight Tournament Opening Round in 2013 on Spike TV.

In his Bellator debut, Zayats faced Brazilian MMA legend and former Strikeforce Light Heavyweight Champion Renato Sobral in the Light Jeavyweight Yournament on January 17, 2013, at Bellator 85. He won the fight via TKO in the first round.

In the semifinal, Zayats faced Jacob Noe. This fight is expected to occur on February 21, 2013, at Bellator 90. He won the fight in dominant fashion, ending it with an armbar submission in the first round.

Zayats faced Emanuel Newton on March 28, 2013, in Bellator Season Eight Light Heavyweight Tournament at Bellator 94. He lost via unanimous decision. Post-fight, Zayats confirmed that he suffered a rib injury just days before the fight. The injury would keep him out of the upcoming Bellator Summer Series.

Zayats faced Aaron Rosa on October 11, 2013, at Bellator 103. He won the fight via Kimura submission.

Zayats entered into the Bellator season ten Light Heavyweight tournament on February 28, 2014. He faced Muhammed Lawal in the semifinals at Bellator 110 and lost the fight via unanimous decision.

== Championships and accomplishments ==
=== Mixed martial arts ===
- Bellator MMA
  - Bellator Season Eight Light Heavyweight Tournament Runner-Up
- M-1 Global
  - M-1 Challenge 2008 Championships.

=== Ju-Jitsu ===
- Ju-Jitsu International Federation (JJIF)
  - Ju-Jitsu European Champion.

=== ARG (Army Hand-to-Hand Combat) ===
- Russian Union of Martial Arts
  - Russian National Champion of Army Hand-to-Hand Combat

=== Sambo ===
- All-Russian Sambo Federation
  - Combat Sambo Russia National Champion.
- Federation International Amateur de Sambo (FIAS)
  - 2008 FIAS World Combat Sambo Championships Gold Medalist.

== Mixed martial arts record ==
Professional record breakdown
32 matches	24 wins	8 losses
By knockout	4	3
By submission	12	2
By decision	8	3

Res.	Record	Opponent	Method	Event	Date	Round	Time	Location	Notes
Win	24–8	Caio Magalhaes	Decision (unanimous)	M-1 Challenge 91 - Swain vs. Nuertiebieke	May 12, 2018	3	5:00	Shenzhen, China	Middleweight debut
Win	23–8	Marcus Vanttinen	Decision (unanimous)	M-1 Challenge 82 - Vanttinen vs. Zayats	August 5, 2017	3	5:00	Helsinki, Finland	
Loss	22–8	Muhammed Lawal	Decision (unanimous)	Bellator 110	February 28, 2014	3	5:00	Uncasville, Connecticut, United States	Bellator Season 10 Light Heavyweight Tournament Semifinal.
Win	22–7	Aaron Rosa	Submission (kimura)	Bellator 103	October 11, 2013	1	0:47	Mulvane, Kansas, United States	
Loss	21–7	Emanuel Newton	Decision (unanimous)	Bellator 94	March 28, 2013	3	5:00	Tampa, Florida, United States	Bellator Season 8 Light Heavyweight Tournament Final.
Win	21–6	Jacob Noe	Submission (armbar)	Bellator 90	February 21, 2013	1	3:38	West Valley City, Utah, United States	Bellator Season 8 Light Heavyweight Tournament Semifinal.
Win	20–6	Renato Sobral	TKO (spinning back fist and punches)	Bellator 85	January 17, 2013	1	4:49	Irvine, California, United States	Bellator Season 8 Light Heavyweight Tournament Quarterfinal.
Win	19–6	Marcin Elsner	Submission (guillotine choke)	Abu Dhabi Warriors 1	November 2, 2012	2	4:44	Abu Dhabi, United Arab Emirates	
Win	18–6	Mathias Schuck	Decision (unanimous)	Cup of Peresvet	September 27, 2012	3	5:00	Bryansk, Russia	
Win	17–6	Alexei Varagushin	TKO (punches)	League S-70: Russian Championship Finals	August 11, 2012	1	3:17	Sochi, Russia	
Win	16–6	Bogdan Savchenko	Submission (guillotine choke)	IMAT: Third Round	April 27, 2012	2	1:28	Bryansk, Russia	
Win	15–6	Juha Saarinen	TKO (doctor stoppage)	Cage 18: Turku	March 3, 2012	2	3:36	Turku, Finland	
Loss	14–6	Vinny Magalhães	TKO (head kick and punches)	M-1 Challenge 27: Magalhaes vs. Zayats	October 14, 2011	3	1:13	Phoenix, Arizona, United States	For the M-1 Global Light Heavyweight Championship.
Win	14–5	Malik Merad	TKO (punches)	M-1 Challenge 25: Zavurov vs. Enomoto	April 28, 2011	2	0:49	St. Petersburg, Russia	
Win	13–5	David Tkeshelashvili	Submission (rear-naked choke)	M-1 Challenge 22: Narkun vs. Vasilevsky	December 10, 2010	1	2:26	Moscow, Russia	
Win	12–5	Matias Baric	Submission (rear-naked choke)	M-1 Challenge 21: Guram vs. Garner	October 28, 2010	3	3:12	St. Petersburg, Russia	
Win	11–5	Toni Valtonen	Submission (armbar)	Fight Festival Goes Kaisaniemi	June 16, 2010	1	4:45	Helsinki, Finland	
Loss	10–5	Robert Jocz	TKO (punches)	BOTE: Chahbari vs. Souwer	March 13, 2010	2	4:05	Zutphen, Netherlands	
Win	10–4	Lee Sang-Soo	Decision (unanimous)	M-1 Challenge 20: 2009 Finals	December 3, 2009	3	5:00	St. Petersburg, Russia	
Loss	9–4	Lucio Linhares	Submission (rear-naked choke)	M-1 Global: Breakthrough	August 28, 2009	1	1:00	Kansas City, Kansas, United States	
Loss	9–3	Alexandre Machado	Decision (unanimous)	M-1 Challenge 15: Brazil	September 5, 2009	3	5:00	São Paulo, Brazil	
Loss	9–2	Jae Young Kim	TKO (head kick)	M-1 Challenge 12: USA	February 21, 2009	2	4:02	Tacoma, Washington, United States	
Win	9–1	David Haagsma	Submission (armbar)	M-1 Challenge 11: 2009 Challenge Finals	January 11, 2009	1	3:25	Amstelveen, Netherlands	Won M-1 Challenge GP team.
Win	8–1	Seung Bae Whi	Decision (majority)	M-1 Challenge 9: Russia	November 21, 2008	2	5:00	St. Petersburg, Russia	
Win	7–1	Alexei Kalistartov	Submission (armbar)	RMAU: Battle of the Champions 3	May 10, 2008	1	2:24	Moscow, Russia	
Win	6–1	John Cornett	Submission (hand injury)	M-1 Challenge 7: UK	September 27, 2008	2	0:44	Nottingham, England	
Win	5–1	Lucio Linhares	Decision (unanimous)	M-1 Challenge 4: Battle on the Neva 2	June 27, 2008	2	5:00	St. Petersburg, Russia	
Loss	4–1	Daniel Tabera	Submission (rear-naked choke)	M-1 MFC: Fedor Emelianenko Cup	May 15, 2008	1	1:59	Belgorod, Russia	
Win	4–0	Christophe Daffreville	Decision (unanimous)	M-1: Slamm	March 2, 2008	2	5:00	Almere, Netherlands	
Win	3–0	Lukasz Jurkowski	Submission (arm-triangle choke)	M-1 MFC: Battle on the Neva	July 21, 2007	3	N/A	St. Petersburg, Russia	
Win	2–0	Jin O'Kim	Submission (armbar)	M-1 MFC: Russia vs. Korea	January 20, 2007	1	2:00	Seoul, South Korea	
Win	1–0	Christophe Durant	Decision (unanimous)	M-1 MFC: Mix-Fight	October 7, 2006	3	5:00	Belgorod, Russia	
