= Sport in Russia =

The most popular sport in Russia is association football. According to Yandex search analysis results rating of the most popular sports among Russians: "Association football topped the list of the most popular sports in Russia" with 5 to 10 million requests. Ice hockey came in second with handball, basketball, futsal, boxing, auto racing, volleyball, athletics, tennis, and chess rounding out the top ten rankings. Other popular sports include bandy, biathlon, figure skating, weightlifting, gymnastics, wrestling, martial arts, rugby union, and skiing.

== History ==
The Soviet Union (USSR) competed in the Olympic Games for the first time at the 1952 Summer Olympics. Soviet and later Russian athletes never finished below fourth place in the number of gold and total medals collected at the Summer Olympics in which they competed. Russia has the most medals stripped for doping violations (51), the most of any country, four times the number of the runner-up, and nearly a third of the global total. The Russian team was partially banned from the 2016 Rio Olympics and 2018 Winter Olympics due to the state-sponsored doping scandal. Russian athletes were allowed to participate at the 2018 Olympics under a neutral flag with a name "Olympic Athletes from Russia".

After the Russian invasion of Ukraine, the International Olympic Committee (IOC) condemned Russia's "breach of the Olympic Truce adopted by the UN General Assembly". The IOC called on individual federations to ban Russian athletes from participating in any international events until further notice. The IOC also withdrew the Olympic Order from Vladimir Putin. The International Paralympic Committee on 3 March banned Russian athletes from competing at the 2022 Winter Paralympics.

On 12 October 2023, the IOC issued a statement noting that after Russia began its full-scale invasion of Ukraine in 2022, the Russian Olympic Committee (ROC) unilaterally transferred four regions that were originally under the jurisdiction of the National Olympic Committee of Ukraine: Donetsk Oblast, Luhansk Oblast, Kherson Oblast, and Zaporizhzhia Oblast to the ROC; at the time, its president said "I don’t see any difficulties here." The IOC stated that the ROC's unilateral action constituted a breach of the Olympic Charter because it violated the territorial integrity of the NOC of Ukraine, and further announced the immediate suspension of the membership of the ROC. The IOC stated that as a result the ROC was no longer entitled to operate as a National Olympic Committee, and could not receive any funding from the Olympic Movement, and that the IOC reserved the right to decide about the participation of individual neutral athletes with a Russian passport in the Olympic Games Paris 2024 and the Olympic Winter Games Milano Cortina 2026. The ban was provisionally lifted in July 2026, allowing Russian athletes to compete at the 2028 Summer Olympics in Los Angeles. Paralympians competed under Russia's flag at the 2026 Winter Paralympics in Italy.

== Popularity ==
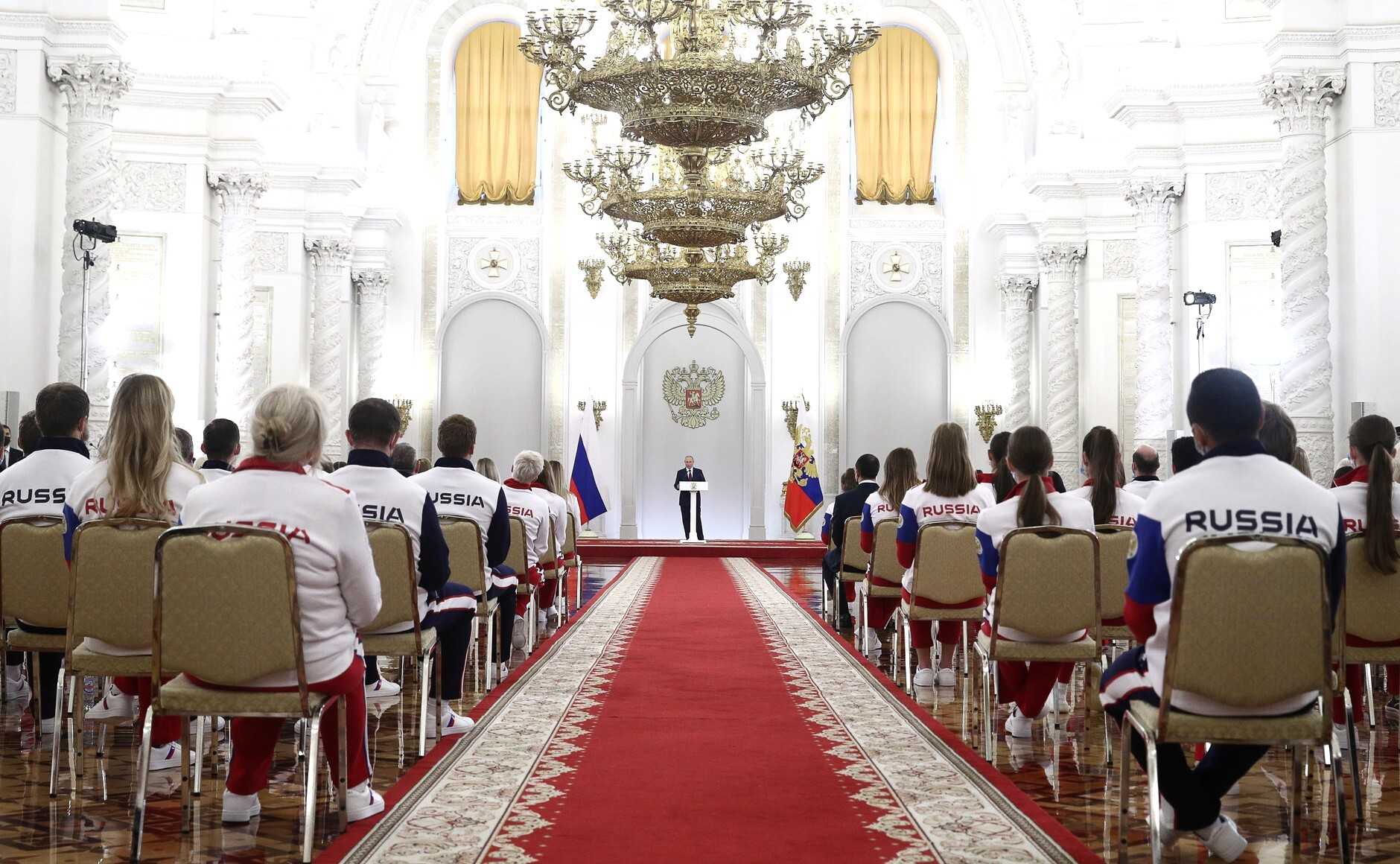
Vladimir Putin addressing the Russian Olympic team in 2021.

According to a 2018 Mediascope survey, ice hockey was the most popular sport among Russians aged 12 to 64, with 50.9% of respondents saying they are interested in events in this sport. In second place is figure skating with 39.2%. In third place was "soccer" with 33.8%. Another top five were biathlon and skiing: 31.9% and 29% respectively. However, the researchers point out that the survey was conducted one month after the Olympic Games in Pyeongchang, which might explain the dominance of winter sports.

Sport	Interested in	Attended events in past 6 months
Ice hockey	50.9%	12.0%
Figure skating	39.2%	2.3%
Football	33.8%	12.2%
Biathlon	31.9%	–
Skiing	29.0%	2.1%
Boxing	18.9%	2.3%
Basketball	13.3%	3.3%
Automobile sport	13.2%	–
Athletics	12.7%	–
Alpine skiing	12.1%	–

In another 2018 survey, the following sports were listed as the most popular:

Sport	Following	Participating
Football	34%	13%
Figure skating	33%	5%
Ice hockey	32%	3%
Skiing/Biathlon	25%	16%
Swimming	18%	19%
Volleyball	14%	11%
Basketball	11%	6%
Chess	7%	4%
Wrestling/Martial arts	5%	9%
Billiards	5%	2%
Gymnastics	4%	5%

== Main team sports ==
=== Association football ===
The first football teams in the Russian Empire appeared in the late 1870s, but they consisted of foreigners living in Russia (English, Scottish, German). Soon Russian teams began to appear. On October 24, 1897, the first official match took place in the Russian Empire. In 1912, the first football championship was held in the Russian Empire.

On 28 February 2022, due to the Russian invasion of Ukraine and in accordance with a recommendation by the International Olympic Committee (IOC), FIFA and UEFA suspended the participation of Russia, including in the Qatar 2022 World Cup. The Russian Football Union unsuccessfully appealed the FIFA and UEFA bans to the Court of Arbitration for Sport, which upheld the bans.

==== Futsal ====
Russia has both men and women futsal teams. Because of the Russian invasion of Ukraine, FIFA and Union of European Football Associations (UEFA) suspended from FIFA and UEFA competitions all Russian teams, both national representative teams and club teams.

=== Ice hockey ===
Ice hockey is one of the most popular team sports in Russia. It is generally accepted that modern Russian ice hockey is linked to the ancient tradition of bandy—a local sport that bears a strong resemblance to ice hockey—which enabled the country to reach the international elite within just a few years. For decades, USSR teams set the sporting standard in amateur ice hockey, achieving immense success at both the national and club levels. The Soviet Union would dominate the hockey world championship and Olympic tournaments from the 1950s to 1980s.

The country has two professional adult leagues and two youth leagues. Children's, women's, and university hockey are also well-developed. The Russian Ice Hockey Federation organizes and oversees championships, cups, and other official sporting competitions, as well as international hockey tournaments throughout the country.

On the international stage, Russia considers Canada its major hockey rival.

=== Handball ===
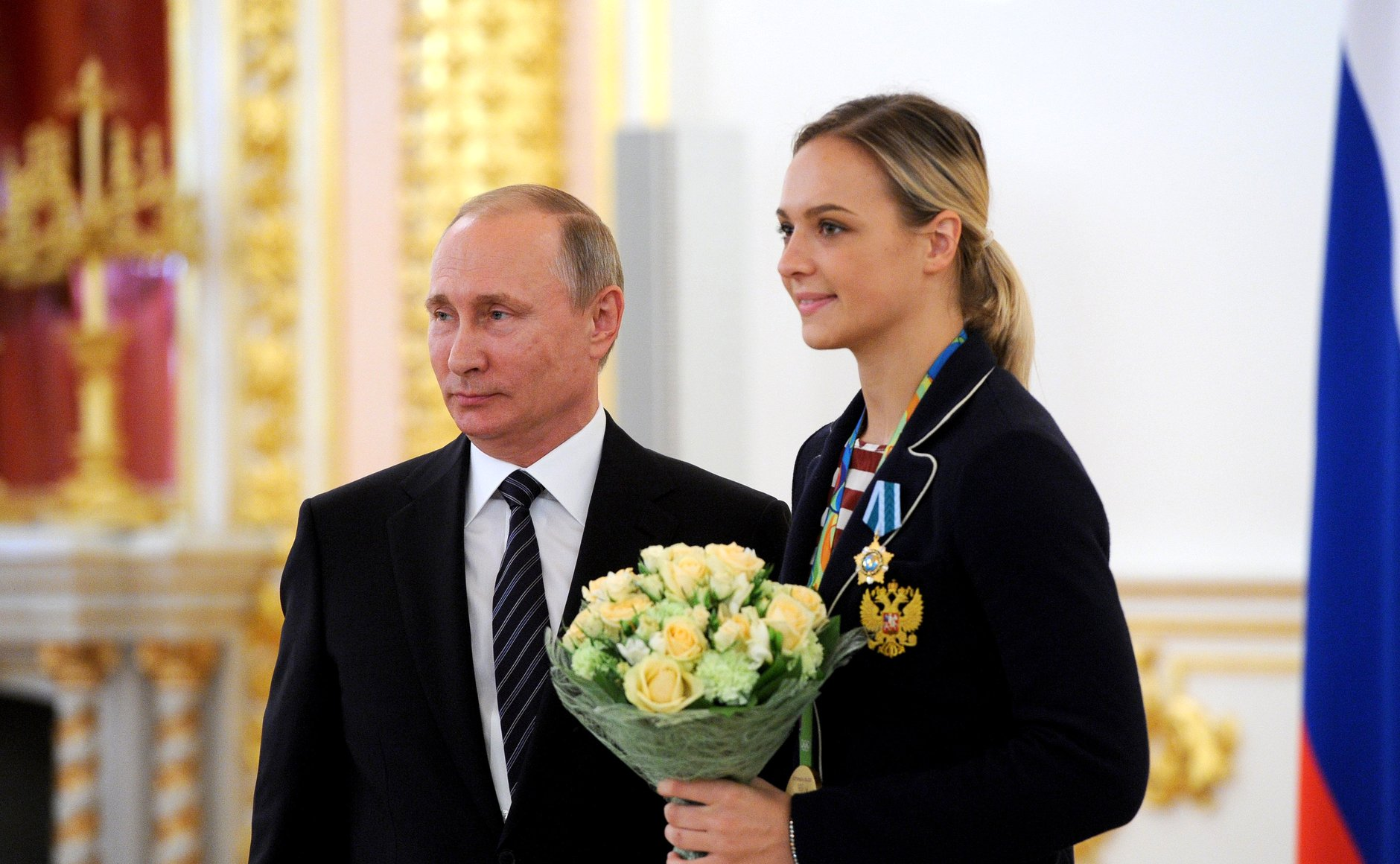
Vladimir Putin with handballer Daria Dmitrieva

Handball is popular in Russia. In reaction to the Russian invasion of Ukraine, the International Handball Federation banned Russian and Belarusian athletes and officials, and the European Handball Federation suspended the national teams of Russia and Belarus as well as Russian and Belarusian clubs competing in European handball competitions. Referees, officials, and commission members from Russia and Belarus will not be called upon for future activities. And new organisers will be sought for the YAC 16 EHF Beach Handball EURO and the Qualifier Tournaments for the Beach Handball EURO 2023, which were to be held in Moscow.

=== Basketball ===
Basketball is a popular sport in Russia. The Russian national basketball team followed the Soviet Union national basketball team, and has won several international titles.

After the Russian invasion of Ukraine, the International Basketball Federation (FIBA) banned Russian teams and officials. EuroLeague suspended CSKA Moscow, UNICS Kazan, and Zenit St. Petersburg. Eurocup Basketball suspended PBC Lokomotiv Kuban. EuroLeague Women suspended UMMC Ekaterinburg, Dynamo Kursk, and MBA Moscow. The National Basketball Association (NBA) suspended all business activities in Russia, including broadcasts.

=== Volleyball ===
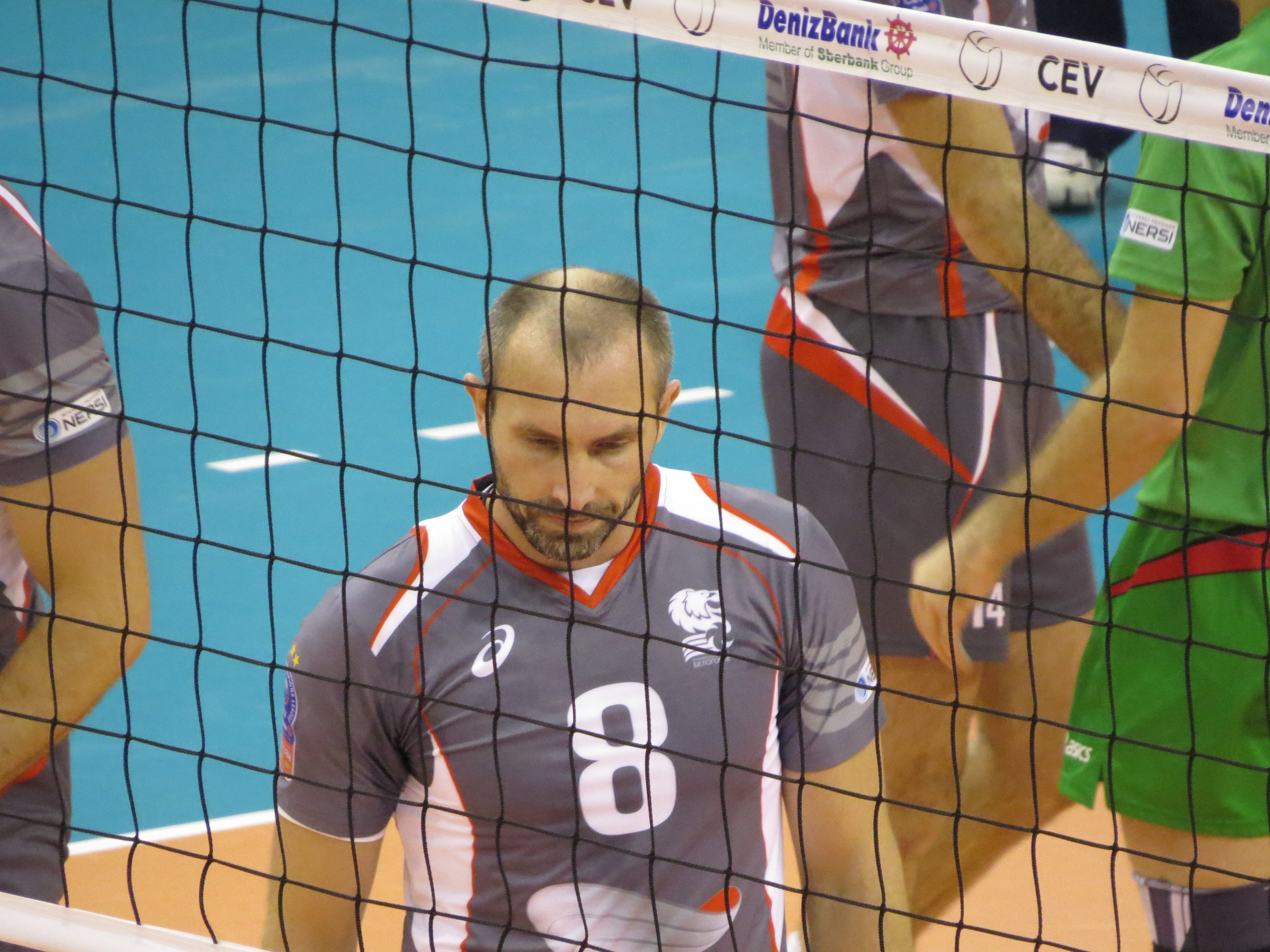
Sergey Tetyukhin was a member of Russia's national volleyball team.

The Russian women's national volleyball team is ranked 8th in the FIVB World Rankings. Record for achievements of the Russian women's volleyball team:

- 2 Olympic silver medals (2000 and 2004)
- 2 FIVB World Championships gold medals (2006 and 2010)
- 1 FIVB Volleyball World Grand Champions Cup gold medal (1997), 1 silver medal (2001), and 1 bronze medal (1993)

Russia featured a women's national team in beach volleyball that competed at the 2018–2020 CEV Beach Volleyball Continental Cup.

In response to the Russian invasion of Ukraine, the International Volleyball Federation suspended all Russian national teams, clubs, and officials, as well as beach and snow volleyball athletes, from all events, and stripped Russia of the right to host the 2022 FIVB Volleyball Men's World Championship in August 2022, and relocated games that were to be in Russia in June and July. The European Volleyball Confederation (CEV) also banned all Russian national teams, clubs, and officials from participating in European competition, and suspended all members of Russia from their respective functions in CEV organs. In June 2023, the federation announced that it had decided to keep in place its ban on Russian and Belarusian teams in volleyball, beach volleyball and snow volleyball, covering Russian and Belarusian national teams, clubs, officials and beach volleyball and snow volleyball players in international and continental events.

=== Calendar of the major men's and women's professional sports leagues in Russia ===
January	February	March	April	May	June	July	August	September	October	November	December
RPL (Association Football)							RPL (Association Football)				
KHL (Ice hockey)								KHL (Ice hockey)			
RHSL (Handball)							RHSL (Handball)				
VTB United League (Basketball)								VTB United League (Basketball)			
Russian Futsal Super League (Futsal)								Russian Futsal Super League (Futsal)			
RVSL (Volleyball)									RVSL (Volleyball)		

January	February	March	April	May	June	July	August	September	October	November	December
		Superleague (Association Football)									
WHL (Ice hockey)								WHL (Ice hockey)			
Russian Women's Handball Super League (Handball)								Russian Women's Handball Super League (Handball)			
Russian Women's Basketball Premier League (Basketball)								Russian Women's Basketball Premier League (Basketball)			
Russian Women's Futsal Super League (Futsal)									Russian Women's Futsal Super League (Futsal)		
Russian Women's Volleyball Super League (Volleyball)									Russian Women's Volleyball Super League (Volleyball)		

== Other team sports ==
=== Bandy ===
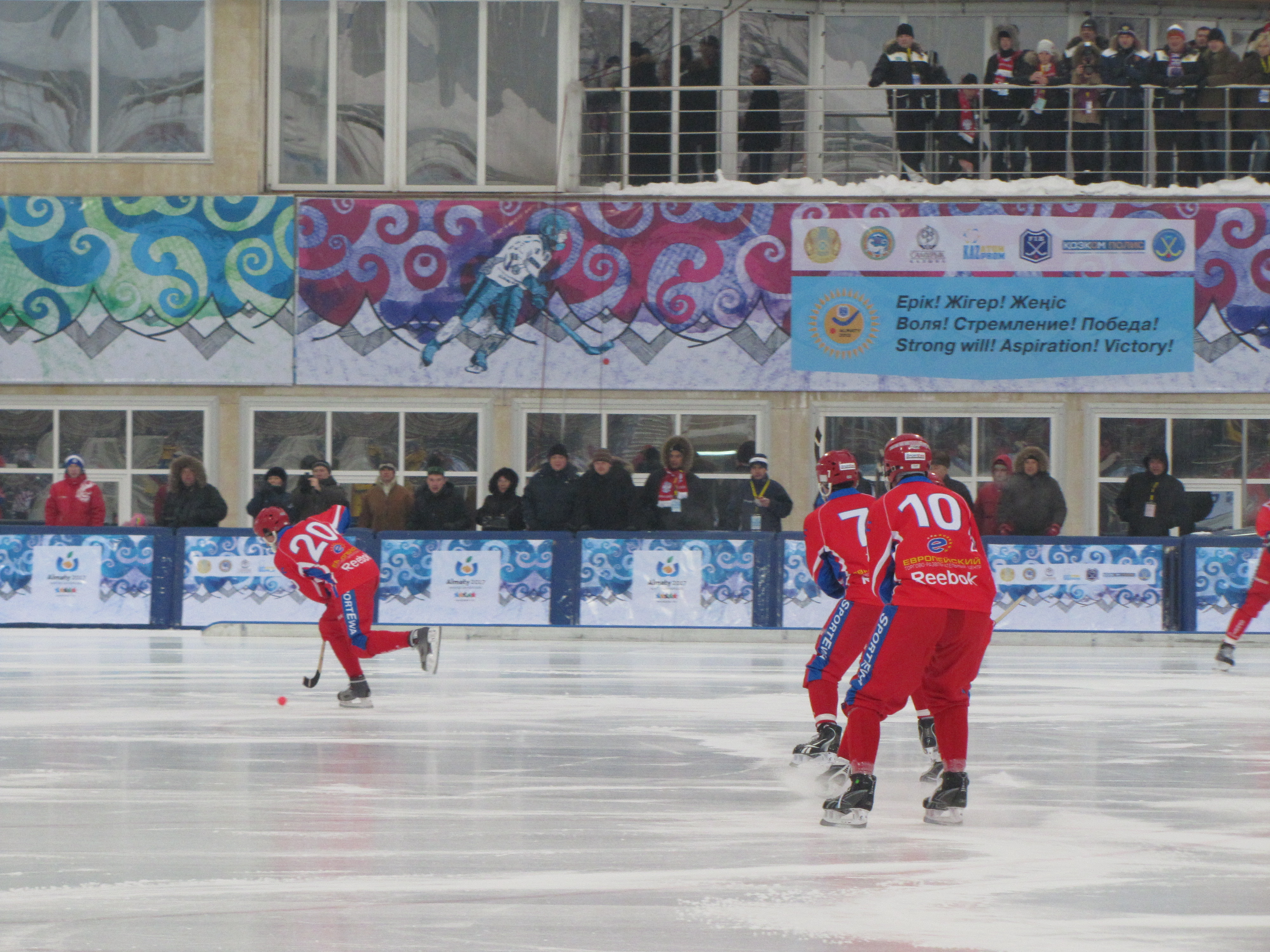
The Russia national bandy team in the World Championship 2012

One traditionally popular sport is bandy (informally called "Russian hockey"). It is considered a national sport, and is one of the biggest spectator sports. According to one survey, it is the third most popular sport in Russia. The Federation of International Bandy was founded in 1955, by the Soviet Union and three Nordic countries. Bandy is the only sport to enjoy the patronage of the Russian Orthodox Church. The Soviet national team won all the Bandy World Championships from the start 1957 until 1979. After 10 rounds of the 2011–12 Russian Bandy League the average attendance was 3,887. The national team for women took the silver medal in the six first World Championships.

After the International Olympic Committee's recommendations following the Russian invasion of Ukraine, the Federation of International Bandy excluded Russia from participating in the 2022 Women's Bandy World Championship. The men's 2020 Bandy World Championship was to be held in Russia, but was cancelled on 1 March 2022, after Finland, Sweden, Norway, and the United States announced that they would not take part in the competition in Russia due to the Russian invasion of Ukraine.

=== Rugby union ===
Rugby union is played in Russia. Russia was ranked 25th worldwide by the International Rugby Board (IRB) in March 2022, with over 100 clubs and close to 20,000 players nationally. Russian domestic rugby went professional in 2005 with the launch of the Professional Rugby League.

Rugby football in the Russian Empire pre-dated the Russian Revolution, but was only played sporadically. It appears to have been the first (non-indigenous) football code to be played in Russia, around a decade before the introduction of association football. In 1886, however, the Russian police clamped down on rugby because they considered it "brutal, and liable to incite demonstrations and riots" Russia competed in the 2011 Rugby World Cup in New Zealand.

After the Russian invasion of Ukraine, World Rugby and Rugby Europe suspended Russia from international and European continental rugby union competition. In addition, the Rugby Union of Russia was suspended from World Rugby and Rugby Europe.

After the Russian invasion of Ukraine, the International Rugby League and European Rugby League banned Russia from all international rugby league competitions.

== Individual sports ==
=== Athletics ===
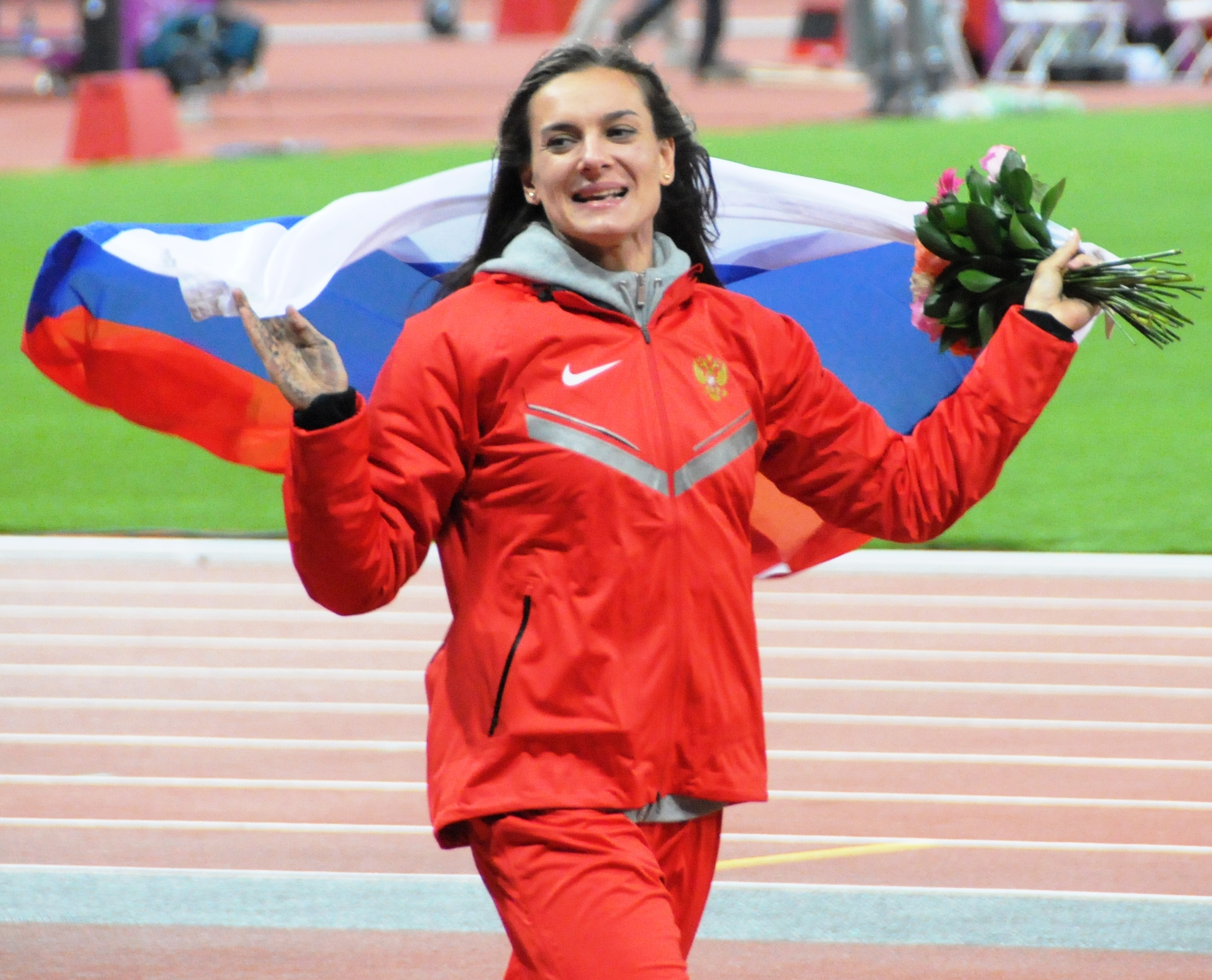
Russian pole vaulter Yelena Isinbayeva

Russia has competed in athletics including high jump, long jump, track athletics, hurdling, pole vault, racewalking, hammer throw, triple jump, javelin throw, and heptathlon.

Russia was banned from the 2017 and 2019 World Championships because of state-sponsored doping. Since 2022, due to the Russian invasion of Ukraine, World Athletics has banned all Russian athletes, support personnel, and officials from all World Athletics Series events for the foreseeable future, including those with ANA status. Also beginning in March 2022, after the Russian invasion of Ukraine, the Diamond League excluded Russian and Belarusian athletes from all of its track and field meetings.

=== Biathlon ===
Biathlon is the most popular winter sport in Russia and ranking 1st in overall polls and TV viewership for the winter seasons. Russia has won Olympic and World medals. As a result of the Russian invasion of Ukraine, the International Biathlon Union banned the participation of Russian athletes and officials at its international events, and suspended the Russian Biathlon Federation.

=== Boxing ===
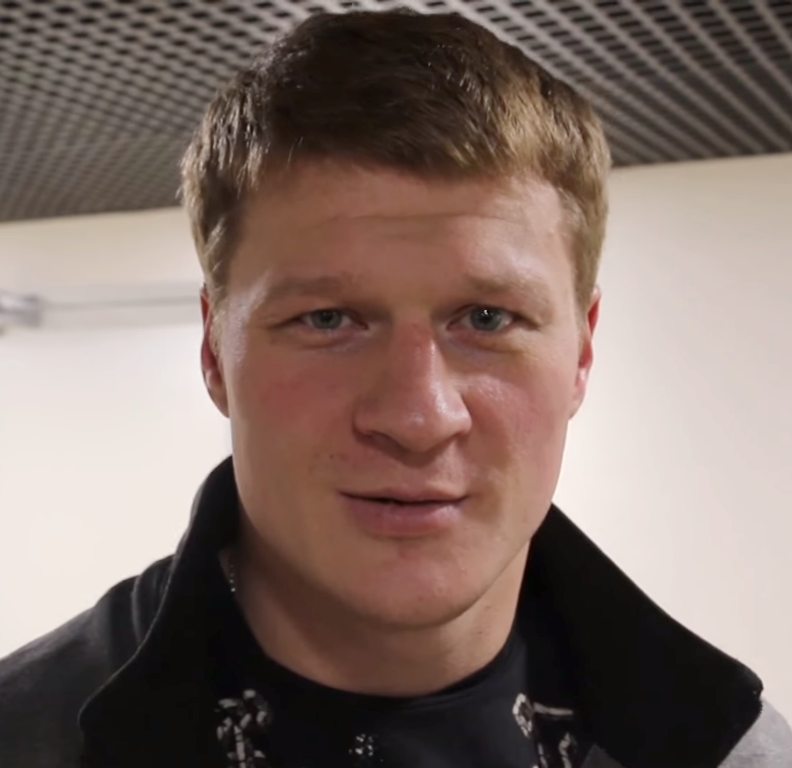
Alexander Povetkin

Russia has had a number of boxing world title holders and Olympic champions.

In June 2023, the International Boxing Association (IBA), led by Russian Boxing Federation Secretary General Umar Kremlev, was expelled from the Olympic Movement following a vote at an Extraordinary International Olympic Committee Session. A total of 69 members of the IOC backed the proposal by the IOC's executive board to banish the IBA, with just one voting against. The President of the Russian Olympic Committee criticised the expulsion.

=== Chess ===
Chess is a favorite pastime, and a sport that has been dominated by Russians in the post-war (1945–) era. The winner of the 1948 World Chess Championship, Russian Mikhail Botvinnik, started an era of Soviet dominance in the chess world.

The 1990s were dominated by Kasparov, who won most of the tournaments that he participated in and reached a then-record rating of 2851 on the July 1999 list. In 2017, 25 of the world's top 100 chess players were Russian.

=== Combat sports ===
==== Fencing ====
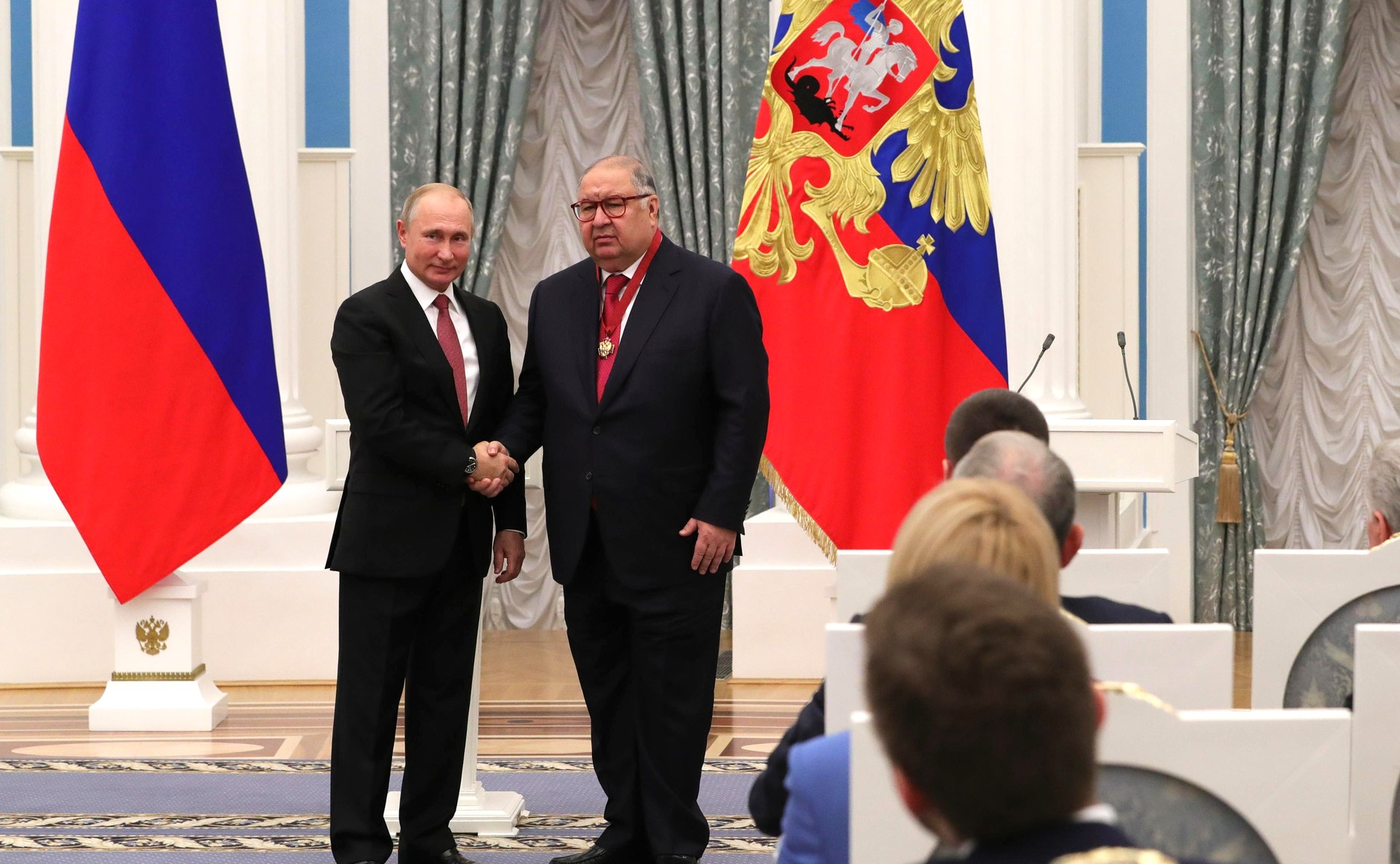
FIE Russian President Alisher Usmanov with Putin.

Fencing in Tsarist Russia was a popular sport among the Russian elites. It transitioned in the Soviet Union as a sport for fencing enthusiasts and became a visible sport for the Soviet people which reached its peak in the 1980s in terms of success and popularity.

After the Russian invasion of Ukraine, the International Fencing Federation (FIE) banned Russia and Belarus athletes and officials. It cancelled or will relocate all events in Russia and Belarus. FIE Russian President Alisher Usmanov stepped down after the European Union imposed economic sanctions on him. In June 2022, Stanislav Pozdnyakov, the Russian Olympic Committee (ROC) President, was removed from his position as European Fencing Confederation (EFC) President at an Extraordinary Congress following a unanimous vote of no confidence in Pozdnyakov in March 2022, due to his xenophobic conduct in the wake of the Russian invasion of Ukraine. In reaction to the emigration to the United States in 2023 of Russian Olympians épée fencer Sergey Bida (a silver medal winner) and his wife épée fencer Violetta Khrapina Bida, joining two-time junior world sabre champion Konstantin Lokhanov as the second and third Russian Olympian fencers to emigrate to the United States after the Russian invasion of Ukraine, in July 2023 the Russian Fencing Federation announced its decision to fire Russian national épée team head coach Alexander Glazunov.

==== Judo ====
The popularity of judo in Russia increased with President Vladimir Putin promoting the sport, and Russia producing multiple Olympic and world champions.

After the Russian invasion of Ukraine, the International Judo Federation (IJF) removed Putin, who is a judo enthusiast, as its Honorary President and ambassador. The IJF also removed Russian Arkady Rotenberg as a member of the IJF's executive committee. It also cancelled all competitions in Russia, but allowed their athletes to compete as neutral athletes.

==== Mixed martial arts ====
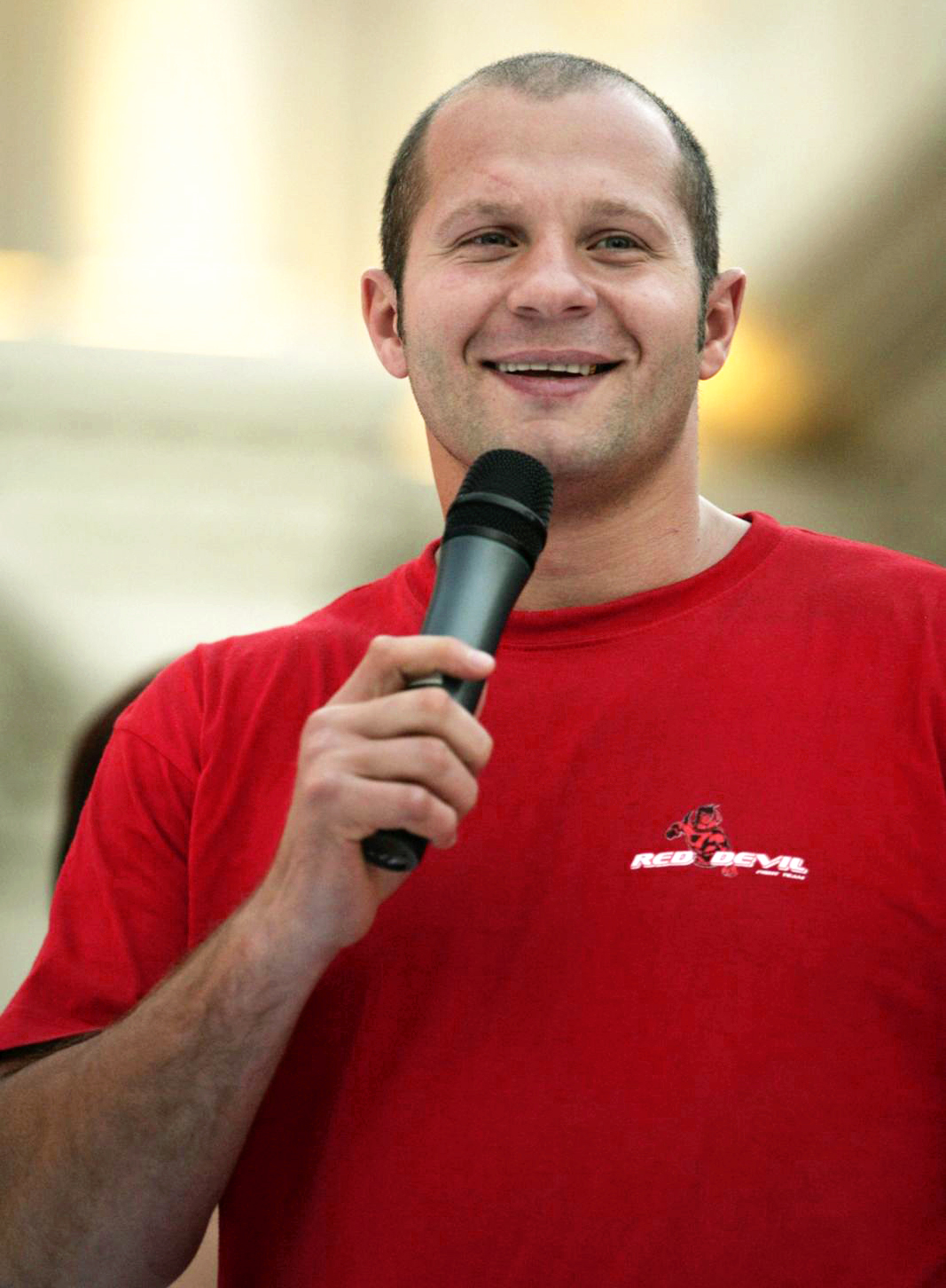
Fedor Emelianenko

In Russia, mixed martial arts (MMA) is another popular sport producing world class international and national fighters. The country has produced renowned MMA fighters such as Fedor Emelianenko and Khabib Nurmagomedov, considered two of the greatest fighters of all time, and in the case of Emelianenko, the greatest of all time. Other names to highlight are Islam Makhachev, Khamzat Chimaev, Petr Yan, Alexey Oleynik, Volk Han, Oleg Taktarov and Ali Bagautinov.

After the Russian invasion of Ukraine the IMMAF suspended the membership of the Russian MMA Union. It barred the Russian federation from participating in all IMMAF Championships, and banned the organisation of IMMAF events in Russia.

==== Sambo ====
Sambo was created in the Russian SFSR in the Soviet Union, by both Russian-born Viktor Spiridonov and Vasili Oshchepkov. The word Sambo is an acronym of samozashchita bez oruzhiya (Russian: самозащита без оружия), which literally translates to 'self-defence without weapons'. Combat Sambo sport matches allow for strikes, ground strikes, wrestling and submissions, and is similar to MMA.

Russian MMA fighters Fedor Emelianenko, and Khabib Nurmagomedov are both former Sambo competitors.

=== Figure skating ===
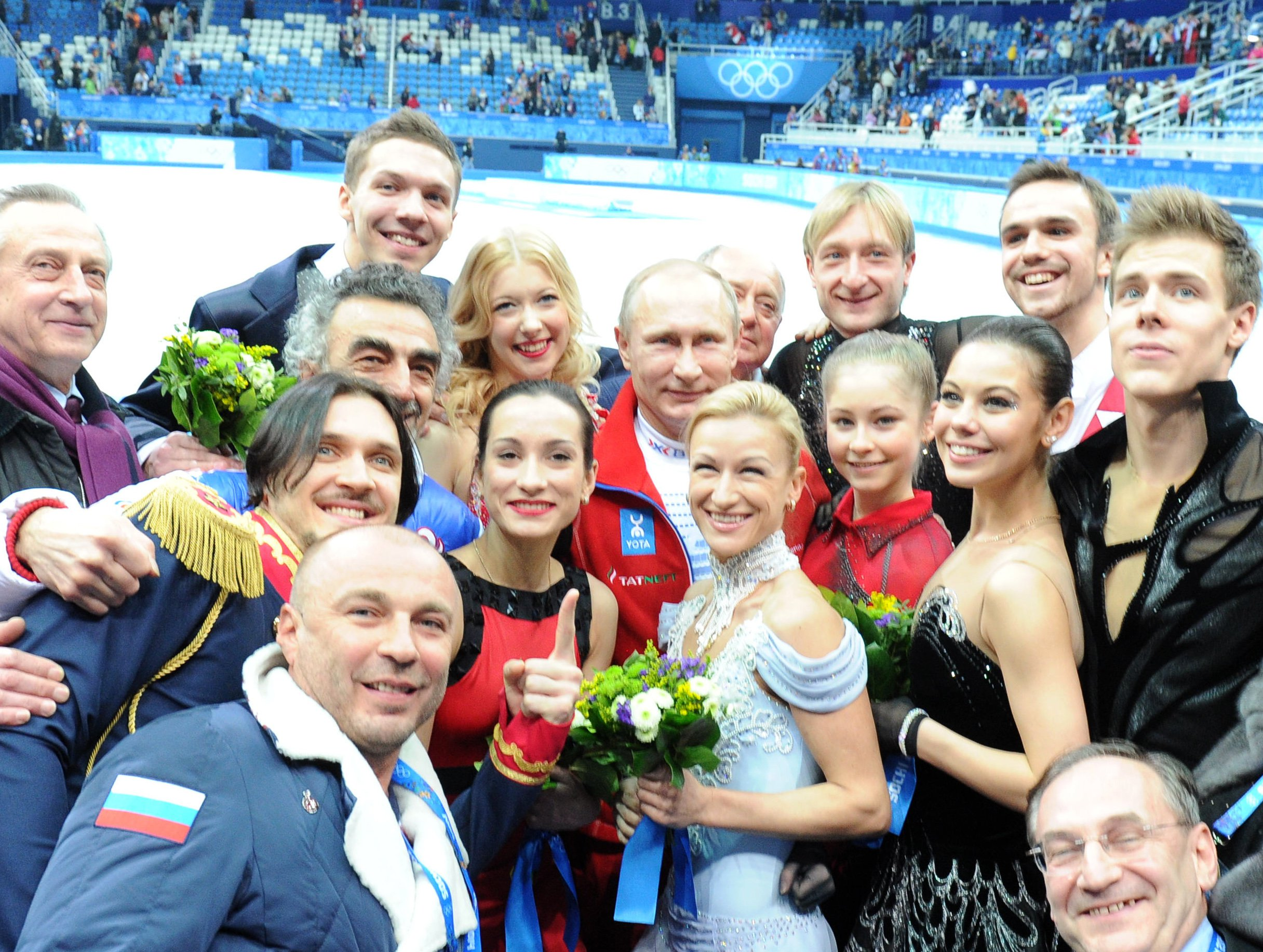
Vladimir Putin and the Russian figure skating team at the 2014 Winter Olympics

Figure skating is a popular sport in Russia. In the 1960s the Soviet Union won a number of medals in figure skating, especially in pairs skating and ice dancing. At every Winter Olympics from 1964 through 2006, a Soviet or Russian pair won gold. The streak ended in 2010 when a Chinese pair won gold in 2010 Winter Olympics, a Russian pair returned to winning gold in pairs at the 2014 Winter Olympics in Sochi.

After the Russian invasion of Ukraine, the International Skating Union banned all athletes from Russia from events until 2026 when the ISU partially lifted the ban on Russian figure skaters, allowing them to compete as Individual Neutral Athletes starting with the 2026–27 season.

=== Gymnastics ===
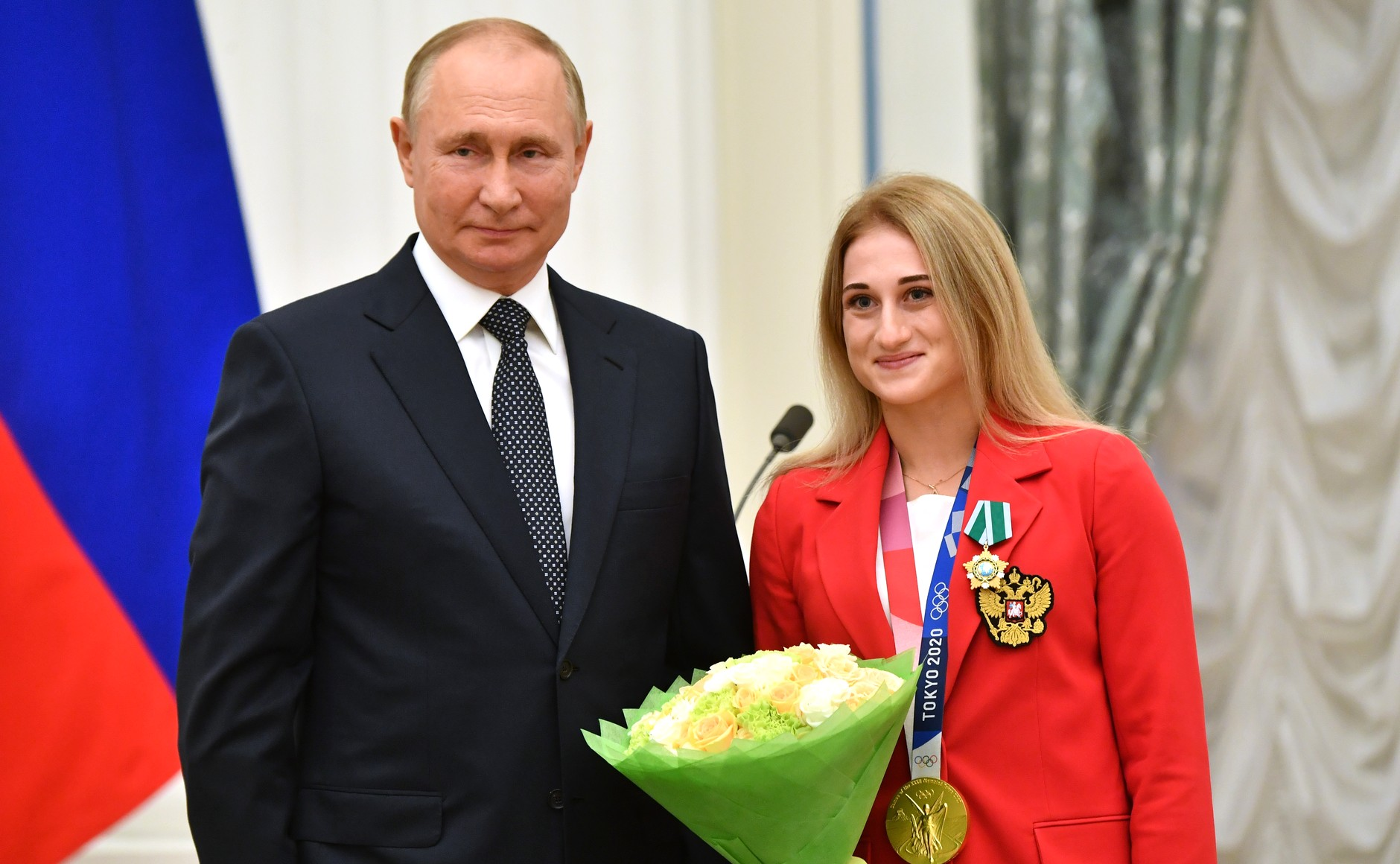
Vladimir Putin and Lilia Akhaimova

Before the breakup of the Soviet Union in 1991, the Soviet women's gymnastics squad won all team titles in World Championship competition and at the Summer Olympics, other than the 1984 Olympics, which they did not attend, and the 1966, 1979, and 1987 World Championships. Most of the Soviet gymnasts were from the Russian SFSR. Russia has medalled at every Worlds and Olympic competition in both MAG and WAG disciplines, except in the 2008 Olympics, where the Russian women team did not win any medals.

Rhythmic gymnastics is a popular sport in Russia. There are many rhythmic gymnastics clubs in Russia, including the Gazprom School at which Irina Viner teaches rhythmic gymnasts in Novogorsk, Moscow, where the Russian national team is also based.

After the Russian invasion of Ukraine, the International Gymnastics Federation (FIG) barred Russian athletes and officials, including judges. The International Gymnastics Federation lifted all restrictions on Russian gymnasts in May 2026 and were allowed to return with their flag and anthem.

=== Motorsport ===
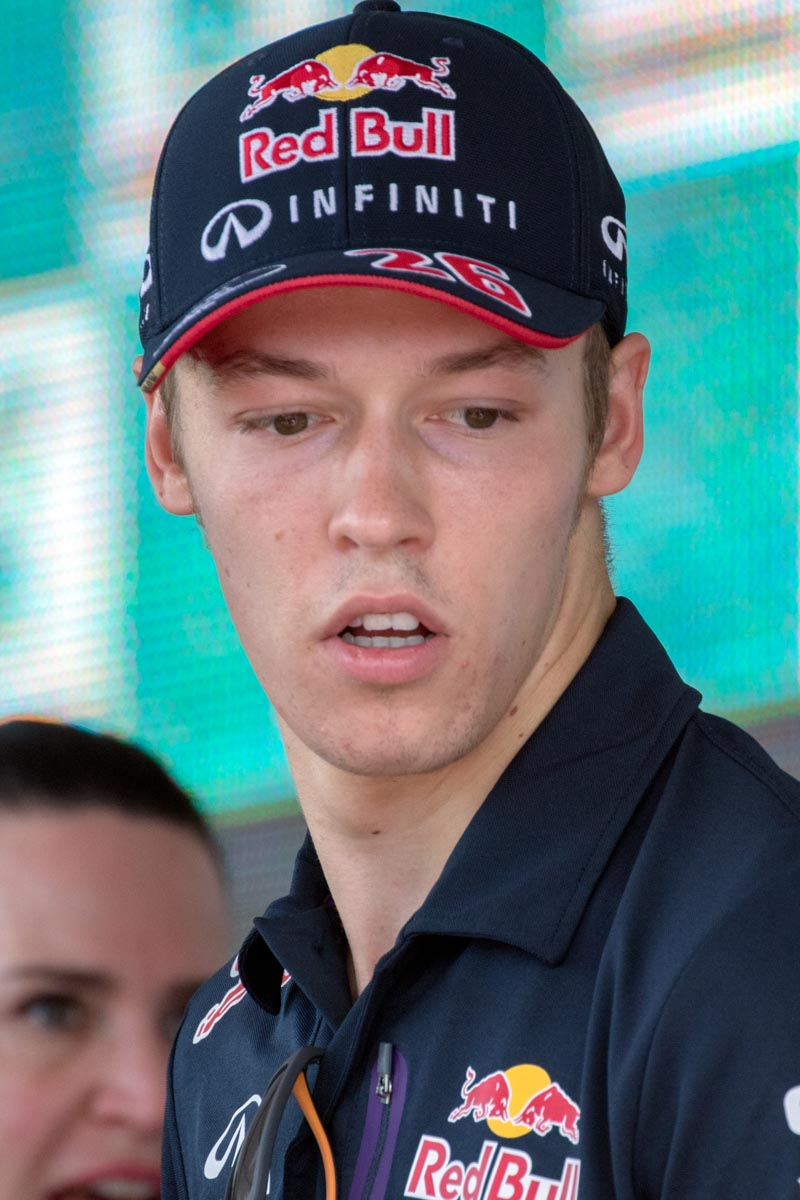
Daniil Kvyat

Vitaly Petrov became Russia's first Formula One driver in 2010. He drove in F1 for three seasons with the Renault and Caterham F1 teams, and finished third at the 2011 Australian Grand Prix. Daniil Kvyat made his debut in F1 in 2014, and took second place at the 2015 Hungarian Grand Prix. The Russian Grand Prix joined the calendar for the 2014 Formula One season, held at the Sochi Autodrom. Sergey Sirotkin joined the grid in 2018 but did not continue after that season. Nikita Mazepin became the 4th Russian driver to compete in Formula 1, for Haas F1 Team. He did compete in the 2021 Formula One World Championship, but due to the Russia Doping Scandal, he competed as a neutral competitor.

In 2022, the Russian Grand Prix, in the Sochi Autodrom, was scheduled to go ahead, but due to the Russian invasion of Ukraine, the FIA cancelled the race. After the Russian invasion led to sanctions from the EU, including some against Uralkali, a company owned by Nikita Mazepin's father, Haas sacked him ahead of the first race.

Also due to the invasion, the Fédération Internationale de l'Automobile (FIA) banned Russian teams, and banned the holding of competitions in Russia. It also excluded Russian FIA members from roles as elected officers or commission members, and banned FIA grants to Russian members. Individual Russian competitors were allowed to enter races as neutrals, without their national symbols, flags, colors, and anthems. British motorsport governing body Motorsport UK barred Russian drivers from competing in British motorsport events, thus preventing Russian F1 driver Nikita Mazepin from participating in the upcoming 2022 edition of the British Grand Prix in Silverstone scheduled to be held in July (in any event, he was sacked by his team), with Motorsport Australia considering a similar move.

Timur Timerzyanov enjoyed success in rallycross, winning the FIA European Rallycross Championship in 2012 and 2013.

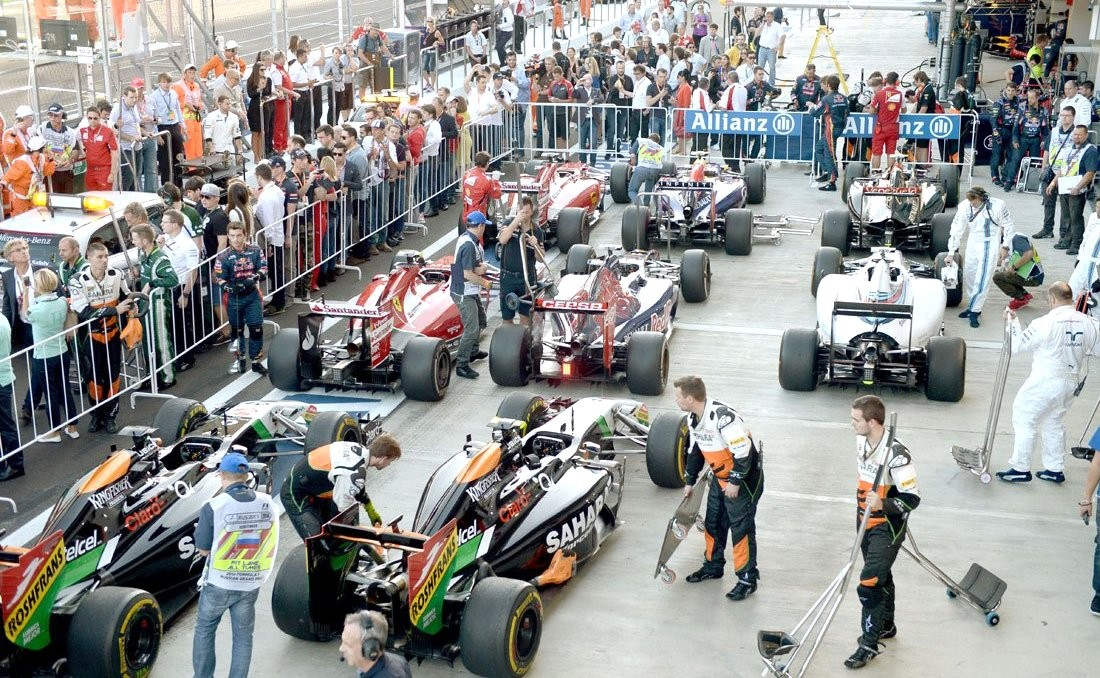
2014 Russia Grand Prix in Sochi

Russian car manufacturer Lada (known domestically as AvtoVAZ) has competed in the World Touring Car Championship, making their debut in 2008 with Russian Bears Motorsport entering Lada 110s. Lada provided factory support in 2009, with the team running three cars and upgrading to the Lada Priora during the season. The team's best performances were a pair of sixth places by James Thompson at the Race of Italy. Lada subsequently withdrew from the championship, but returned in 2012, entering a Lada Granta WTCC driven by Thompson at a couple of race meetings. Subsequently, they announced plans to contest a full season in 2013. The team ran two cars in 2013, with a best result of a fifth place for Thompson in the Race of Russia, and expanded to a three car squad for 2014. Former World Touring Car Champion Robert Huff gave Lada their first WTCC win at the 2014 Beijing round.

==== Motorcycle racing ====
Motorcycle racing is popular in Russia. After the Russian invasion of Ukraine, Fédération Internationale de Motocyclisme (FIM) banned all Russian and Belarusian motorcycle riders, teams, officials, and competitions. It cancelled one of the 2022 Speedway Grand Prix events, FIM Speedway GP of MFR – Togliatti, which was supposed to be held in Tolyatti on 9 July, stating that "in the current circumstances it is not possible to hold the FIM Speedway GP of MFR Togliatti."

=== Speed skating ===
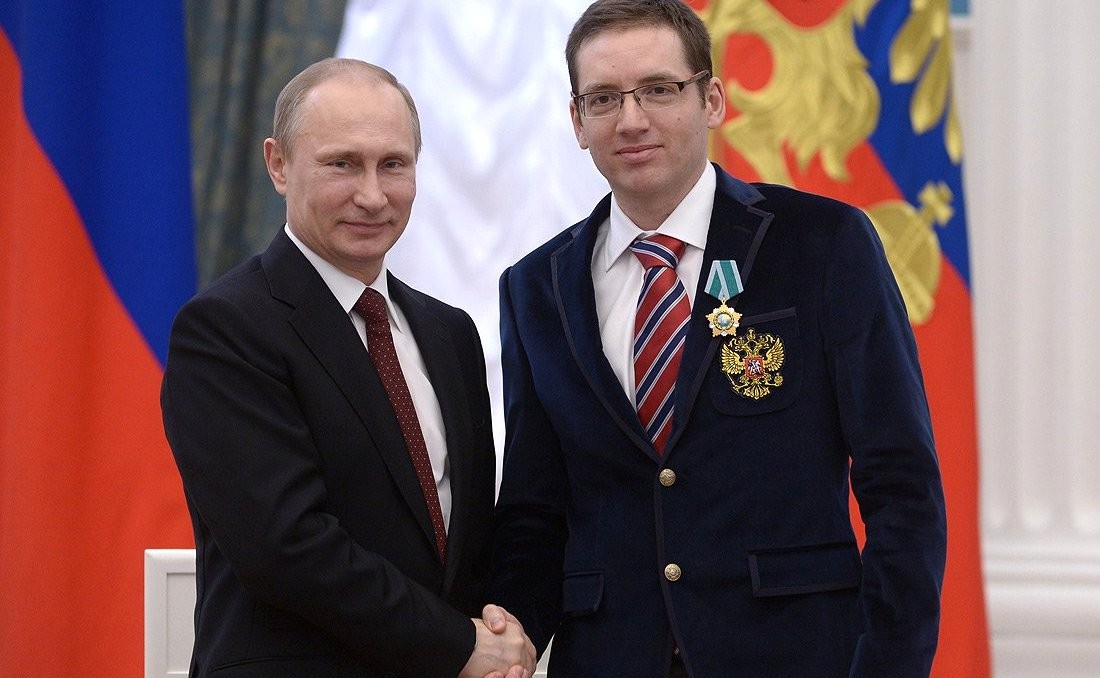
Vladimir Putin and head coach of the Russian short track speed skating team Sébastien Cross

Long track speed skating has a tradition in Russia since the Russian Empire. After the collapse of the Soviet Union, the Russian Federation won medals in speed skating in World Championships and World Cups.

After the Russian invasion of Ukraine, the International Skating Union banned all speed skating athletes from Russia from events until further notice. In June 2023 it announced that it was maintaining its ban.

=== Individual winter sports ===
Individual winter sports the Soviets and Russians have participated in are bobsleigh, skeleton, and luge.

After the Russian invasion of Ukraine, the International Bobsleigh and Skeleton Federation suspended the participation of Russian athletes and officials. It also suspended the Bobsleigh Federation of Russia until its next Congress in July 2022.

Also after the Russian invasion, the International Luge Federation banned all Russian athletes, coaches, and officials from its events. It also suspended all Russian officials appointed to its Commissions and Working Groups by the executive board, and made Russia ineligible to host any of its events. In May 2023, the International Ski Federation (FIS) extended its ban on Russian and Belarusian athletes and officials at its events.

=== Swimming and diving ===
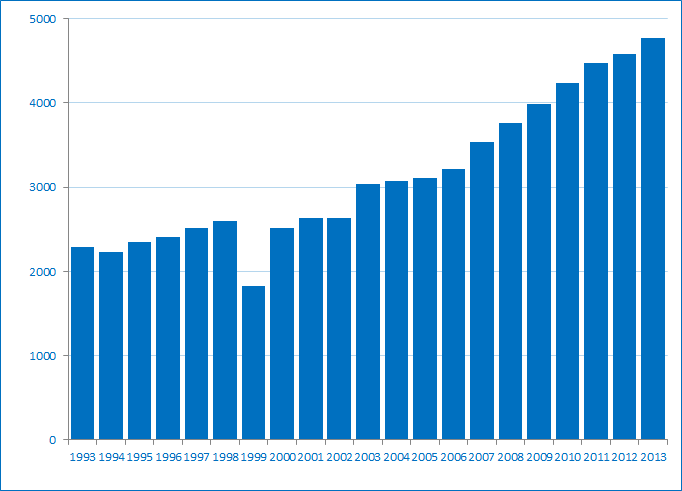
Number of swimming pools in Russia, 1993–2013

Swimming is mostly an elite sport for most Russians; however, before the dissolution of the USSR, swimming was an institutionalized and recreational sport. Russia has not achieved the same success as that of the Soviet Union.

In March 2022, after the Russian invasion of Ukraine, FINA banned all Russians from competing at the 2022 World Aquatics Championships, and withdrew the 2022 FINA World Swimming Championships (25 m) from being held in Russia. This came after indefinitely banning athletes and officials of Russia from wearing the colours of Russia, swimming representing Russia with Russia's name, and the playing of Russia's national anthem in the case an athlete from Russia won an event.

=== Tennis ===
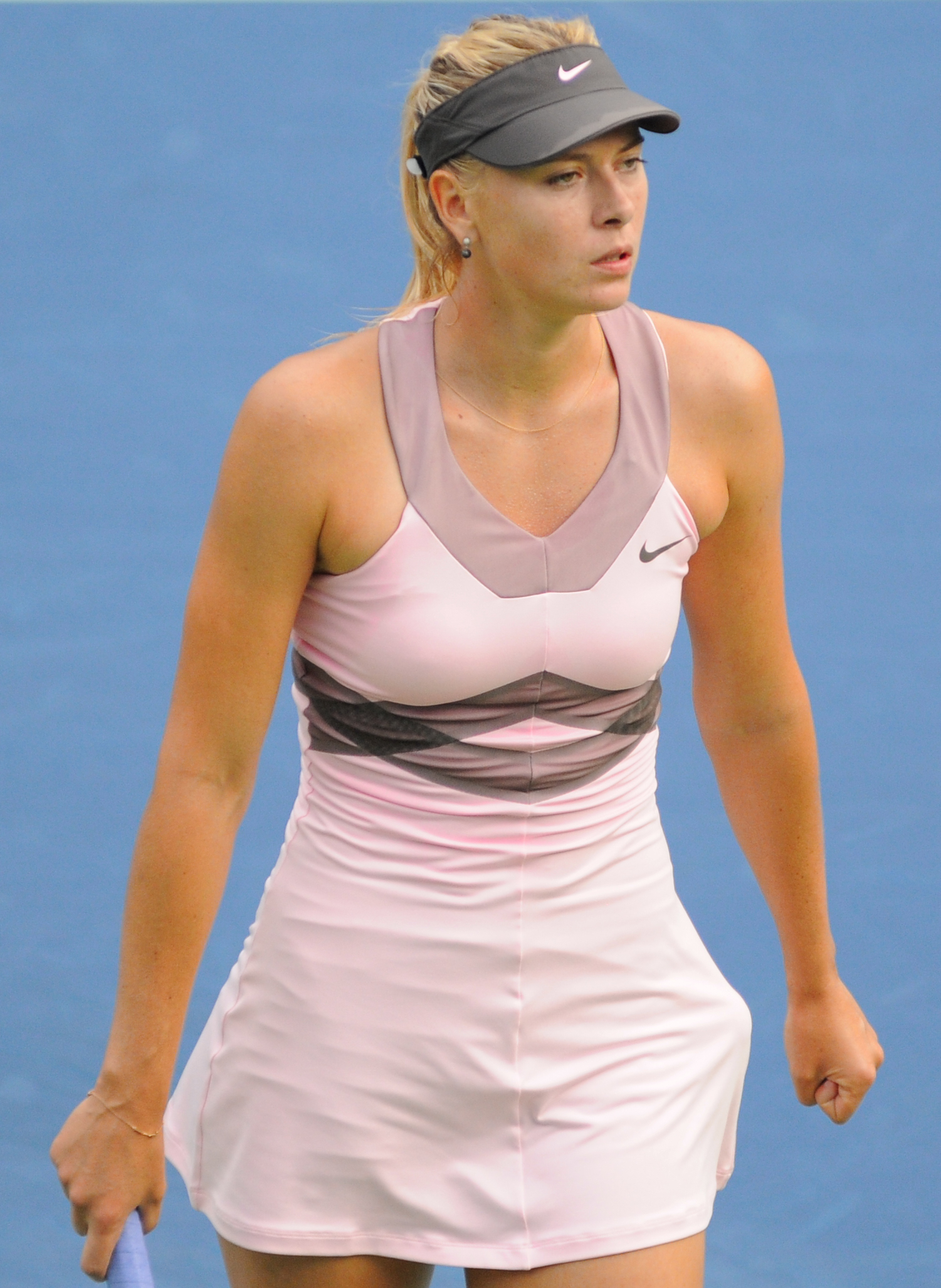
Maria Sharapova was Russia's most successful tennis athlete.

Russia has produced a number of successful tennis players. Russians Maria Sharapova and Dinara Safina reached number one in the WTA rankings. Anastasia Myskina won the 2004 French Open. Sharapova won five Grand Slam titles. The Russian Federation won the Fed Cup 4 times, in 2004, 2005, 2007, and 2008. At the 2008 Beijing Olympics, Russia swept the women's tennis podium with Elena Dementieva winning the gold, Safina and Vera Zvonareva the silver and bronze. As of January 2022, one Russian woman was ranked in the WTA tour's top 20, Anastasia Pavlyuchenkova.

Marat Safin and Yevgeny Kafelnikov are amongst Russia's most successful male players. They won two Grand Slam titles each, with Kafelnikov winning the 1996 French Open and 1999 Australian Open. Safin won the US Open in 2000, and the 2005 Australian Open. Kafelnikov also won a gold medal at the 2000 Olympic Games. The Russian men won three Davis Cup titles (2002, 2006, 2021) and one ATP Cup (2021). Russia has also seen new talent come through the men's rankings with Daniil Medvedev, who briefly reached number one in the rankings in early 2022, and Andrey Rublev. Medvedev won the 2021 US Open against Novak Djokovic, and has reached five other grand slam finals; the 2019 US Open, where he lost to Rafael Nadal, the 2021 Australian Open which he lost to Djokovic, the 2022 Australian Open, which he also lost to Nadal, the 2023 US Open to Djokovic and the 2024 Australian Open to Jannik Sinner. Other notable Russian players include Nikolay Davydenko, who won the ATP Finals in 2009, Mikhail Youzhny and Karen Khachanov.

In reaction to the Russian invasion of Ukraine, the Association of Tennis Professionals (ATP) moved the 2022 St. Petersburg Open from Saint Petersburg to Kazakhstan. The International Tennis Federation (ITF) cancelled all events in Russia. The ITF also excluded Russia from international team events, which include the Davis Cup, the Billie Jean King Cup, and the ATP Cup, and suspended the Russian Tennis Federation. However, the ATP and the WTA refused to yield to international pressure to ban individual players from competition. Russian players will carry on, but not play under the Russian national flag.

In April 2022, the organisers of the Wimbledon Championships, a Grand Slam-level event in the UK, banned players representing Russia from entering the 2022 edition of the competition. The LTA, the British tennis association, also banned players representing Russia from smaller tennis tournaments in the UK. In response, the ATP, WTA, and ITF stripped Wimbledon of its ranking points, with their concerns being based on the principle of participation based on merit, rather than nationality, as well as the unilateral decision by Wimbledon, in contrast with the remainder of the tour.

=== Wrestling ===
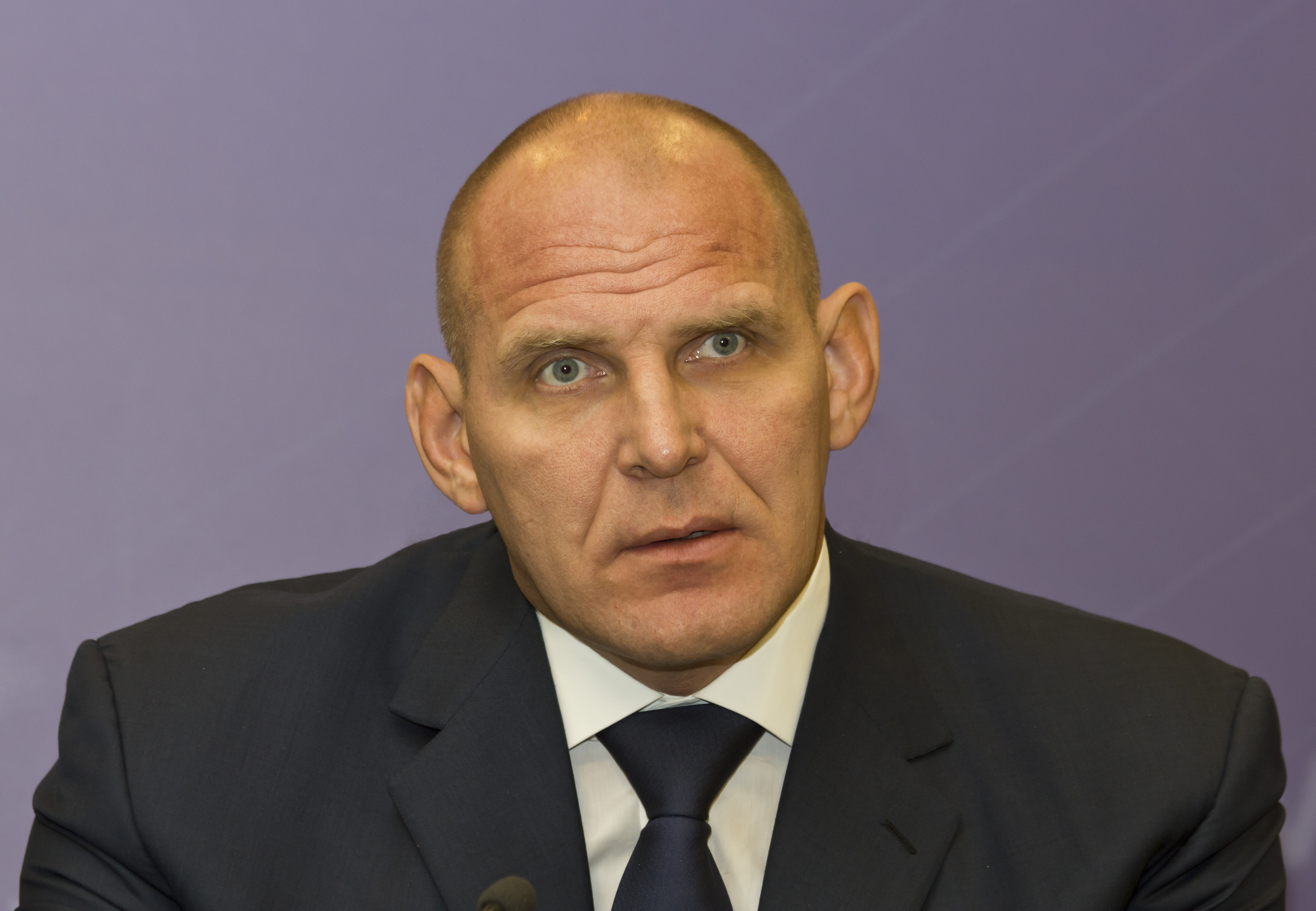
Russia's wrestler, Alexander Karelin

Russia has produced multiple Olympic and World wrestling champions, including 3 time Greco-Roman Olympic gold medalist Alexander Karelin, who was named the greatest ever Greco-Roman wrestler of the 20th century by the International Federation of Associated Wrestling Styles (FILA),

Wrestling is the most accessible and played out sport for boys and young adults in Russia especially in the Caucasus Republics and regions (Chechnya, Dagestan, Karachay-Cherkessia, North-Ossetia, Kabardino-Balkaria, Ingushetia).

=== Weightlifting ===
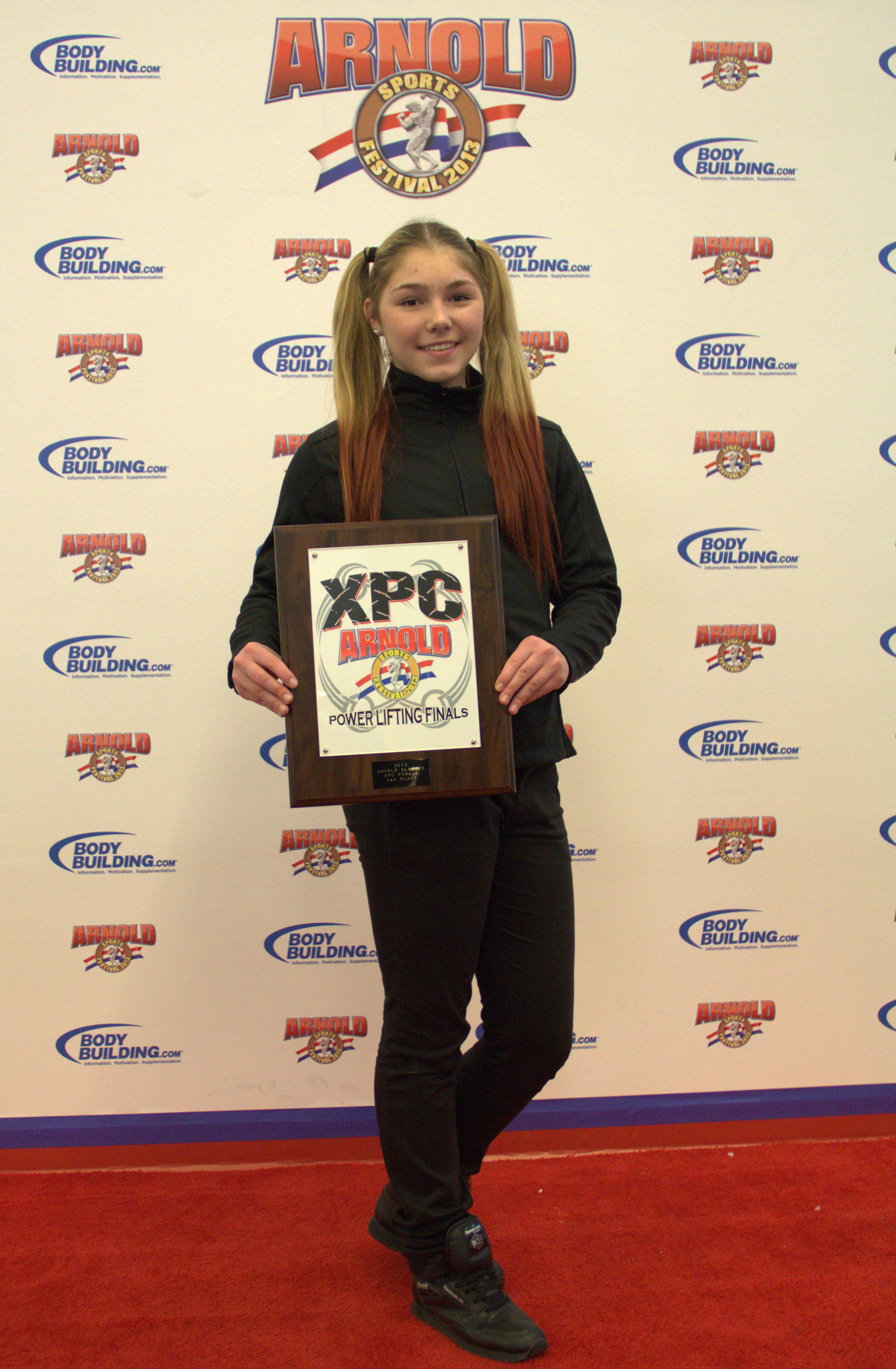
Maryana Naumova, youngest powerlifter world champion (subsequently banned for doping)

A strongman competition in Russia is Powerlifting, which is akin to a variant evolving from weightlifting. Russia is an active in the International Powerlifting Federation and one of the most successful countries along with the United States, Poland, Norway, United Kingdom, Taiwan, Sweden, Finland, Japan, and Ukraine.

== See also ==
- Sport in Saint Petersburg
- Lapta (game)
