= Maryana =

Maryana is a variation of the name Mariana which is common in some cultures, and may refer to:

- A given name typically for a woman found in Russian language, Ukrainian language, and Spanish language countries.
- Maryana Marrash (1848–1919), Syrian poet
- Maryana Naumova (born 1999), Russian powerlifter
- Maryana Iskander an Egyptian-American social entrepreneur
- Maryana Dvorska a Ukrainian-American fitness model, actress, and social entrepreneur based in Los Angeles
