= Sport in Saint Petersburg =

Overview of sports in Saint Petersburg, Russia

Sport in Saint Petersburg has a long tradition, back to the founding days of Saint Petersburg in the early 18th century.

== History ==
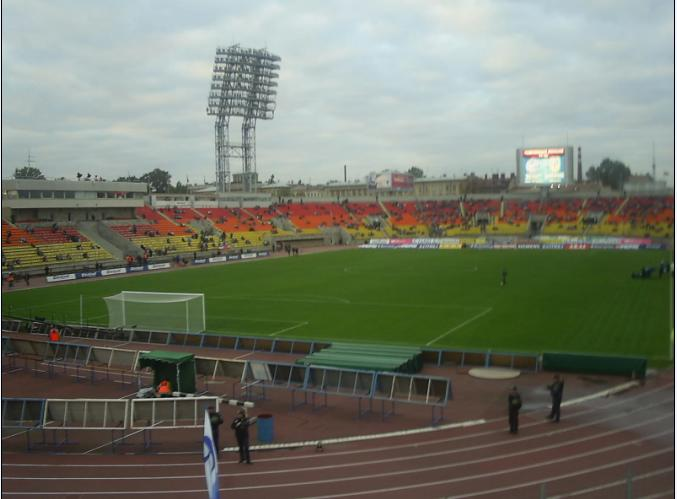
FC Zenit's home Petrovsky stadium

The first competition here was the 1703 rowing event initiated by Peter the Great, after the victory over the Swedish fleet. Yachting events were held by the Russian Navy since the foundation of the city. Yacht clubs: St. Petersburg River Yacht Club, Neva Yacht Club, the latter is the oldest yacht club in the world. In the winter, when the sea and lake surfaces are frozen and yachts and dinghies cannot be used, local people sail on ice boats.

=== International sports events held in Saint Petersburg ===
St. Petersburg hosted part of the football (soccer) tournament during the 1980 Summer Olympics. The 1994 Goodwill Games were held here. It bid for 2004 Summer Olympics and might bid again for 2032 Summer Olympics if Russia's ban on state-sponsored doping would end before host decision.

=== 2022 Russian invasion of Ukraine ===
Because of the Russian invasion of Ukraine, the 2022 UEFA Champions League final, which was set to be played in St Petersburg's Krestovsky Stadium, was relocated to the Stade de France in Saint-Denis, France.

== Sports ==
=== Bandy ===
A sport with long history in Russia is bandy, and this was played on the frozen Neva River in the 19th century. The Saint Petersburg team Yusupov Sad («Юсупов Сад») toured Germany, Sweden and Finland in 1907 under the name Sankt Petersburger Amateur Eislaufverein and won most of its games. Bandy was also played during the Soviet years, with Dynamo Leningrad becoming the runner-up for the Soviet Cup in 1947 and Lenin IVF Leningrad being the runner-up for the Soviet Union Championship in 1952. However, Saint Petersburg has not had an elite team in this sport since BSK Saint Petersburg had to cease its operations in 2005.

=== Basketball ===
Piterbasket, a team sport closely resembling basketball, created in 2002 at Saint Petersburg.

=== Chess ===
Chess tradition was highlighted by the 1914 international tournament, in which the title "Grandmaster" was first formally conferred by Russian Tsar Nicholas II to five players: Lasker, Capablanca, Alekhine, Tarrasch and Marshall, and which the Tsar had partially funded.

=== Equestrian ===
Equestrianism has been a long tradition, popular among the Tsars and aristocracy, as well as part of the military training. Several historic sports arenas were built for Equestrianism since the 18th century, to maintain training all year round, such as the Zimny Stadion and Konnogvardeisky Manezh among others.

=== Powerboating ===
One of the first international major sport event held in Saint Petersbourg is Formula 1 powerboating also called F1H2O. The first edition of the World Championship F1H2O Grand Prix of Russia was held in 1995. Since then the event took place again in 1996 1997 1998 1999 2008 2009 2010. The event used to take place in front of Hermitage Museum

== Sports venues ==
Kirov Stadium (now demolished) was one of the largest stadiums anywhere in the world, and the home to FC Zenit St. Petersburg in 1950–1989 and 1992. In 1951 the attendance of 110,000 set the record for the Soviet football. Zenit now plays their home games at Krestovsky Stadium.

== Saint Petersburg teams ==
Club	League	Sport	Venue	Established	Championships
Zenit Saint Petersburg	RFPL	Football	Krestovsky Stadium	1926	1 UEFA Cup, 1 UEFA Super Cup, 6 Russian Championships, 1 USSR Championship
Kondrashin Belov	PBL	Basketball	Sibur Arena	1935	2 Saporta Cups, 1 Russian Cup, 2 USSR Championships, 2 USSR Cups
Avtomobilist St. Petersburg	VSL	Volleyball	Platonov Volleyball Academy	1935	2 CEV Cups, 2 Russian Championships, 3 USSR Championships, 2 USSR Cups
SKA Saint Petersburg	KHL	Ice hockey	Ice Palace	1946	2 Gagarin Cup Championships
Politekh St. Petersburg	MFSL	Futsal	Kalinin District MFOK	1995	0 Championships
Petrotrest St. Petersburg	FNL	Football	MSA Petrovsky	2001	1 Second Division Championship
SKA-1946 St. Petersburg	MHL	Ice hockey	MSA Yubileyny	2009	0 Championships
Serebryanye Lvy	MHL	Ice hockey	Spartak Ice Palace	2010	0 Championships
VC Zenit Saint Petersburg	VSL	Volleyball	Platonov Volleyball Academy	2017	0 Championships

== See also ==
- Sport in Russia
