= Russian Women's Futsal Super League =

- Founded: 1993
- Country: Russia
- Confederation: UEFA
- Number of clubs: 6
- Domestic cup: Women's Cup
- Current champions: Normanochka (2021–22)

The Russian Women's Futsal Championship is the women's premier futsal championship in Russia, is operated by the AMFR. It was founded in 1993, which is played under UEFA rules and currently consists of 6 teams.

Because of the 2022 Russian invasion of Ukraine, FIFA and Union of European Football Associations (UEFA) suspended from FIFA and UEFA competitions all Russian teams, whether national representative teams or club teams.

== Champions by year ==
Season	Winner
1993	Baltica St. Petersburg
1994	Junior Volgograd
1995	Junior Volgograd
1996	S. Ljubertcy
1997	S. Ljubertcy
1998	Lok. Volgograd
1999	Lok. Volgograd
2000	Lok. Volgograd
2001	Rokada Volgograd
2002	Rokada Volgograd
2003	Rokada Volgograd
2004	Chertanovo Moscow
2005	Chertanovo Moscow
2006	Chertanovo Moscow
2007	Viktoria N. Novgorod
2008	Laguna Penza
2009	Laguna Penza
2010	Aurora St. Petersburg
2011	Laguna Penza
2012	Laguna Penza
2013	Laguna Penza
2014	Aurora St. Petersburg
2015	Laguna Penza
2016	Aurora St. Petersburg
2017	Torpedo Moscow
2018	Aurora St. Petersburg
2019	Aurora St. Petersburg
2020	Aurora St. Petersburg
2021	Normanochka Nizhny Novgorod
2022	Normanochka Nizhny Novgorod
2023	Kristall St. Petersburg
