= Piterbasket =

Ball game similar to basketball

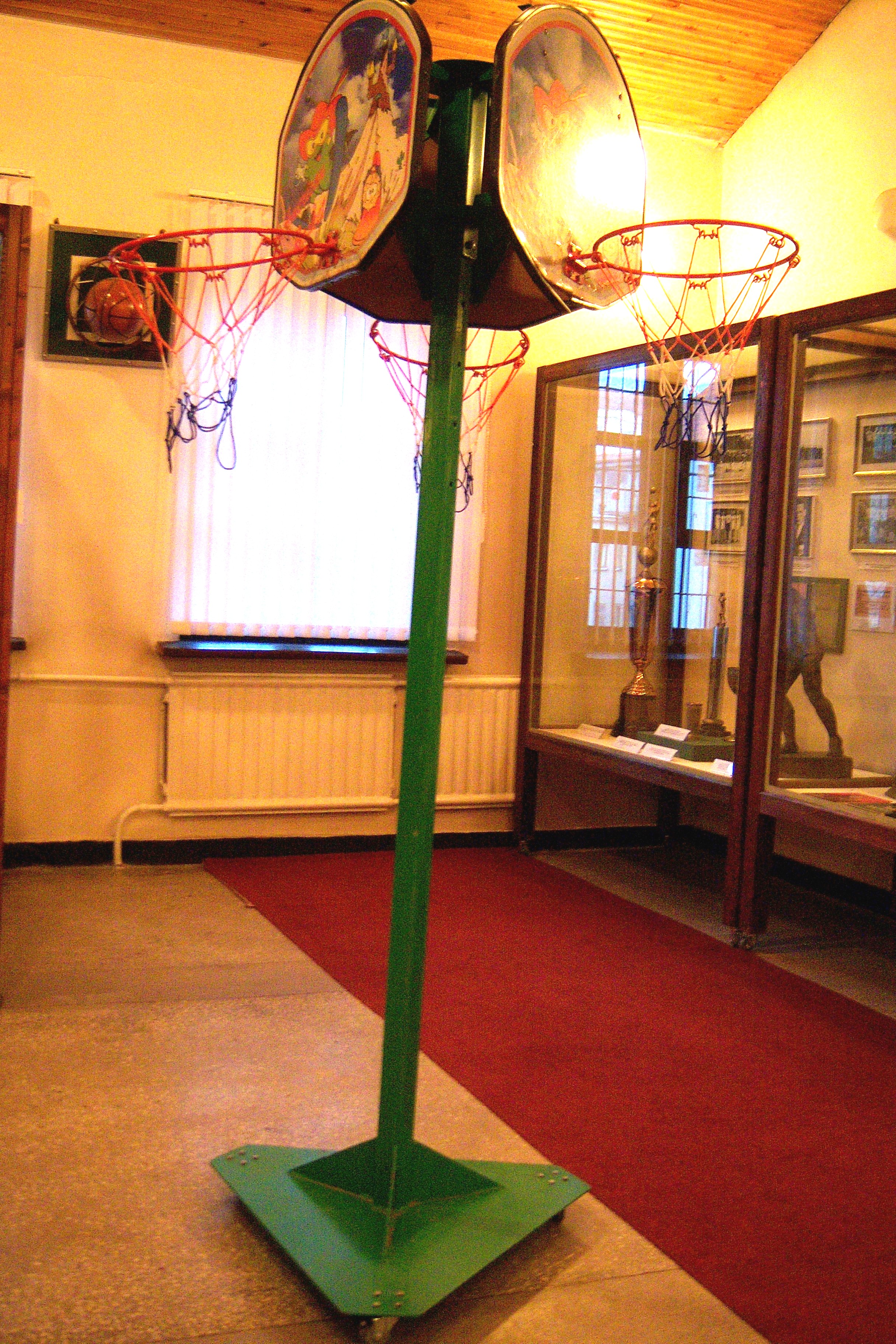
Piterbasket in Lithuania.

Piterbasket (ru. - Питербаскет, lt. - piterbolas, trikrepšis) is a team sport closely resembling basketball. The game was initially created for kindergarten children, but is now played by adults and handicapped athletes.

Piterbasket was created by Anatolij Nesmejanov in Saint Petersburg, Russia in 2002. In 2010 in Kaunas, Lithuania held the world's first international piterbasket match between Kaunas and Saint Petersburg teams. In 2011, piterbasket was included in Lithuania's national Olympic kindergarten festival programme.
