= Maryana Naumova =

Russian powerlifter (born 1999)

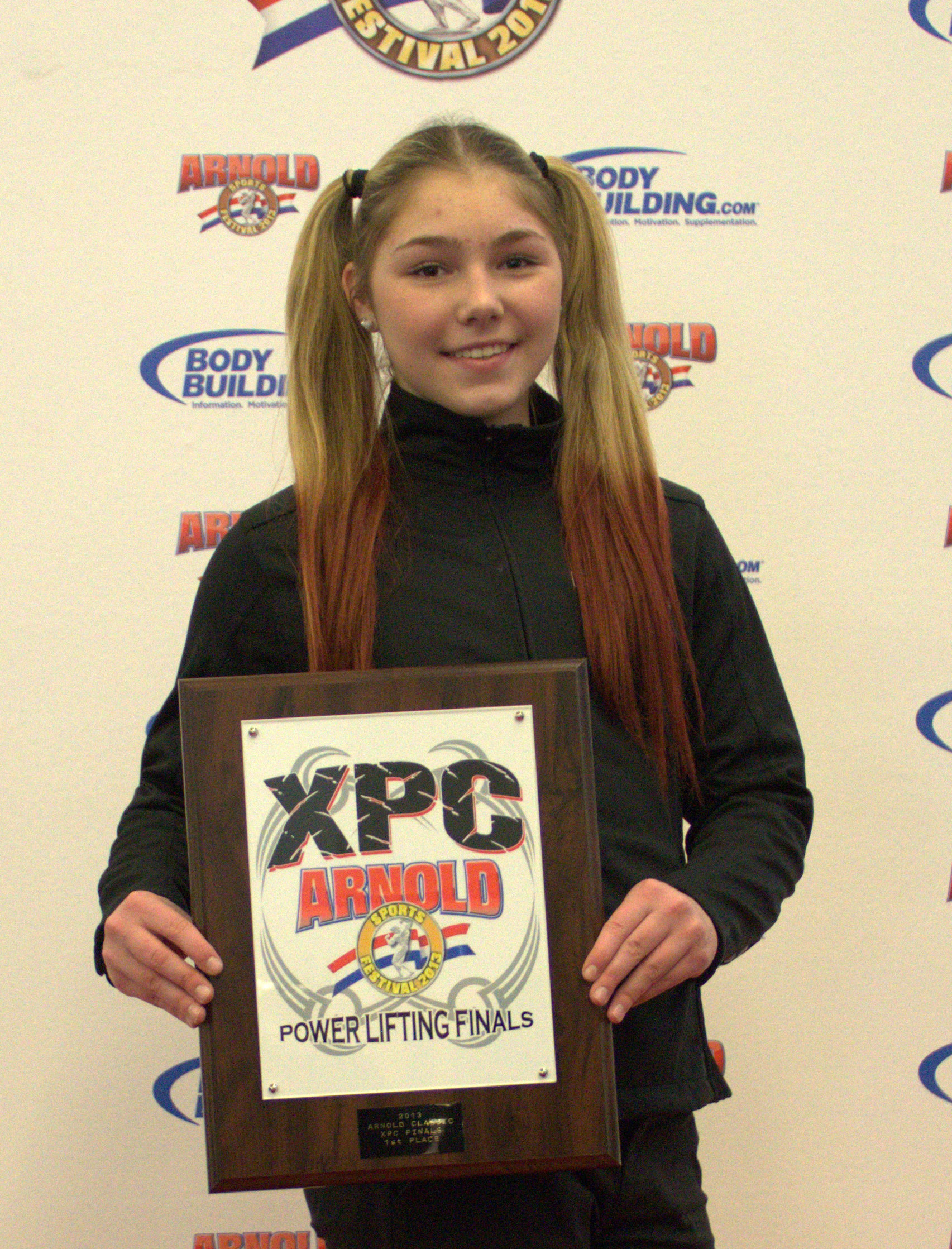
- Naumova at the 2013 Arnold Classic
- Born: Maryana Aleksandrovna Naumova; 22 April 1999 (age 25); Staraya Russa, Novgorod Oblast, Russia
- Occupation(s): Powerlifter, journalist, TV presenter, war correspondent
- Height: 1.73 m (5 ft 8 in)
- Parent(s): Aleksandr Valentinovich Naumov; Olga Igorevna Ivanova

Maryana Aleksandrovna Naumova (Russian: Марьяна Алекса́ндровна Нау́мова; born 22 April 1999) is a Russian powerlifter, journalist, and television presenter. Specializing in the bench press, she was one of the top teenage female lifters in the world. Naumova has won multiple world championships, set over 15 world records in her age category, and holds the title of Master of Sport of Russia, International Class.

Between 2009 and 2016, she competed in multiple world powerlifting championships, setting records in federations such as IPA, WPC, IPL, and IRP. She was the first girl under 18 allowed to compete in professional powerlifting tournaments and featured on the cover of Powerlifting USA magazine.

In 2016, the International Powerlifting Federation (IPF) found that Naumova had used banned substances, including diuretics and masking agents, leading to her disqualification for two years. She returned to competitive powerlifting in 2018.

Since 2022, Naumova has been a television presenter on the socio-political talk show Vremya Pokazhet on Channel One. She is also a war correspondent and blogger, as well as a member of the Lenin Communist Youth Union (LKSM).

== Early life ==
She was born on April 22, 1999 in the town of Staraya Russa, Novgorod Oblast. Studied at Khimki general education lyceum No. 12. In 2017, after completing secondary education, she entered the Russian State University for the Humanities. As of 01.04.2019 studied at the 2nd year of the Faculty of International Relations and Foreign Regional Studies.

In 2003, she began practicing sports aerobics, in 2009 — powerlifting (bench press).

== Career ==
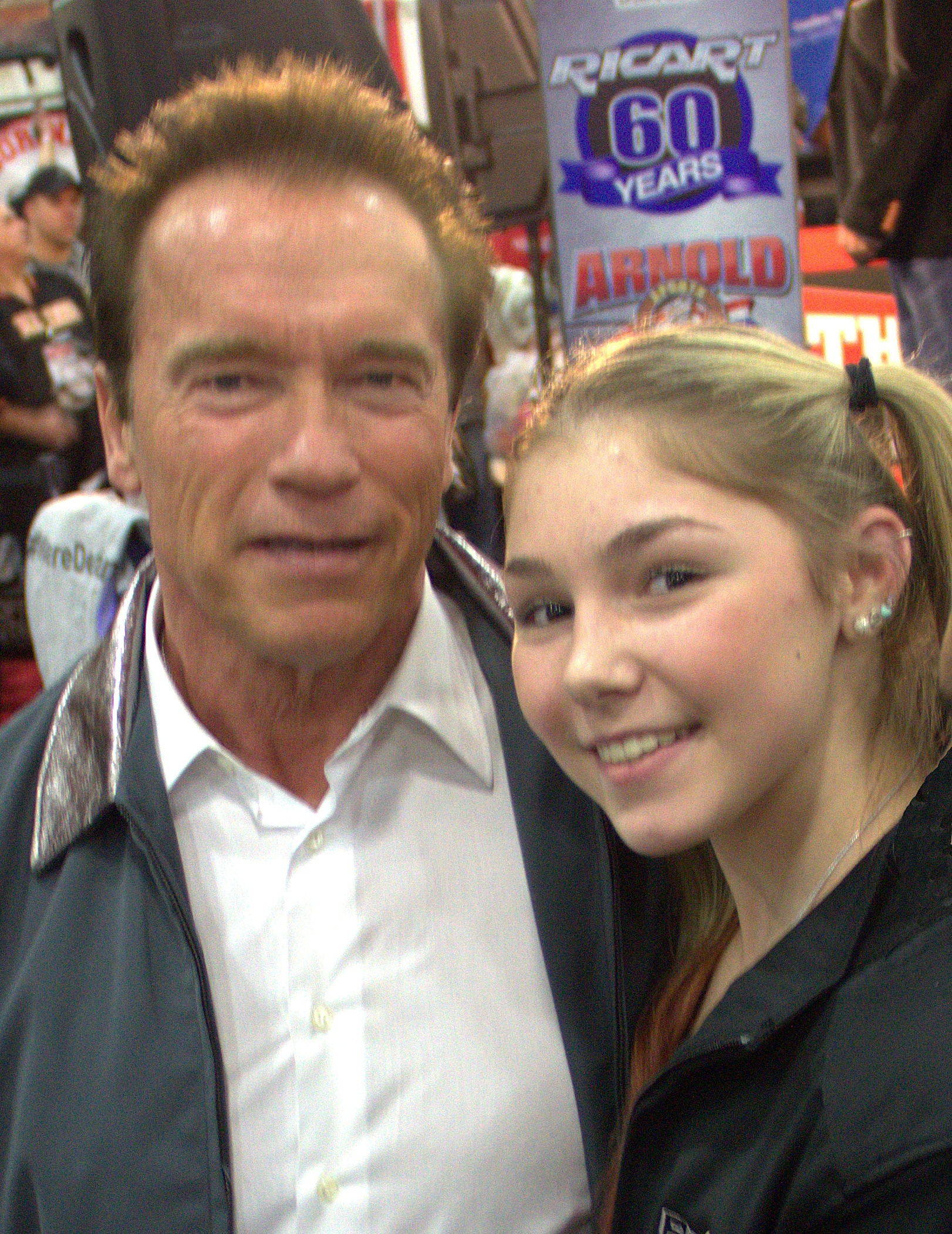
Maryana Naumova at the Arnold Classic, 2013, with Arnold Schwarzenegger

Maryana Naumova is the first female under-18 to be allowed to participate in professional powerlifting tournaments. In March 2015, she participated in the Arnold Classic, establishing the female record in the event Arnold BenchBach, lifting 150 kg (330 lb). After the tournament she asked Arnold Schwarzenegger to become the President of the United States and normalize Russia–United States relations. She also passed Arnold letters from Donbas children. She said that Arnold Schwarzenegger is a very important person in her life.

== Disqualification ==
In March 2016, Mariana Naumova, the only female athlete from the world's leading powerlifting federation IPF to compete at the Arnold Sports Festival, tested positive in a doping test. The 17-year-old athlete was disqualified due to diuretics in her sample and suspended by the IPF sports federation for two years and fined.

== Political views ==
As part of Russia's support for the Assad government during the Syrian Civil War, Naumova travelled to Damascus at the invitation of Asma al-Assad, the president's wife. In commemoration of the late Russian revolutionary Vladimir Lenin, Naumova had joined the Communist Party of the Russian Federation to celebrate Lenin's 146th birthday and lay flowers at the Mausoleum on Red Square. Naumova was awarded the Order of the UCP-CPSU—also known as "Friendship of the People"—for her humanitarian aid work throughout the world. Professional MMA fighter Jeff Monson had also joined Naumova and the Communist Party to celebrate the life and legacy of Lenin.

In 2017, Naumova said:

To me, communism, first and foremost, equals justice. I cannot say that I studied it extensively ... But I do know that in the Soviet Union people enjoyed considerable social protection. Any kid from Siberia, if he wanted it, could apply to any university without having to pay bribes. But now [in post-Soviet Russia] society is divided into classes: there are the rich who can afford almost anything, and there are ordinary people who’re limited to living in small apartments, eating low-quality food bought in chain stores and working all day long in order to survive and feed their children. I believe that this is unjust, and this is why I’m a member of the Komsomol.

In 2022, Naumova published a video reply to Arnold Schwarzenegger, inviting him to visit the Donbas region in order to witness the plight of the civilians under fire from Ukrainian forces. Naumova said that given that Schwarzenegger visited United States Army troops during the invasion of Iraq, he should be brave enough to visit children of Donbas that are being shelled by Ukrainian forces. Supporting Russia's invasion of Ukraine and positioning herself as a war correspondent, Maryana Naumova participated in "courses for war correspondents" organized by the Wagner Group.

== Sanctions ==
On January 7, 2023, amid Russia's invasion of Ukraine, Maryana Naumova was placed on Ukraine's sanctions list because she "frequently visits frontline and occupied territories of Ukraine to film propaganda stories in support of the war in accordance with Kremlin narratives" and "supports Putin's aggression and mass murder of civilians in Ukraine". The sanctions imply blocking of assets, complete cessation of commercial operations, halting fulfillment of economic and financial obligations. Earlier Naumova was included by ACF in the list of corrupt and warmongers with a proposal to impose international sanctions against her.

== Awards ==
Municipal and state bodies and organizations

- On April 28, 2015 "for active public work and high professionalism" Maryana Naumova was awarded a Letter of Gratitude of the Moscow Regional Duma.
- 30.12.2015 Maryana Naumova was awarded with a badge of honor "With gratitude from the Head" of Khimki Urban District, Moscow Oblast.
- 24.09.2019 Maryana Naumova was awarded a Letter of Gratitude from the State Duma of the Russian Federation (A Just Russia faction) for her humanitarian mission in Donbass.
- 12.03.2020 Maryana Naumova was awarded a Certificate of Merit of the Moscow Regional Duma for her contribution to the development of children's and youth sports and promotion of a healthy lifestyle.

Departmental and public

- Order of "Friendship" SCP-CPSU (April 22, 2016 "Union of Communist Parties — Communist Party of the Soviet Union" — Union of Communist Organizations).
- Order of Merit to the Party of the CPRF (April 22, 2019, Communist Party of the Russian Federation, the highest party award).

Awards of other countries

- Honorary title "Honored Master of Sports of the DNR" (Resolution of the People's Council of the DNR I-151P-NS of April 24, 2015) — "for outstanding contribution to raising the prestige of the Donetsk People's Republic and the athletes of Donbass at the international level, efforts to help the children of Donbass, and exceptional courage and skill shown in doing so".
- Badge of Distinction "For Merit to the Republic" No. 45 (Decree of the Head of the DNR No. 108 of May 4, 2017, Donetsk) — for fruitful state and public activity, special merits in humanitarian and charitable activities, protection of human dignity and rights of citizens of the Donetsk People's Republic.
- Honorary Citizen of the DNR (7.05.2021).
