= Shanon Slack =

American mixed martial arts fighter (born 1983)

- Born: April 23, 1983 (age 43); Chicago, Illinois, United States
- Other names: The Heartbreak Kid
- Nationality: American
- Height: 5 ft 7 in (1.70 m)
- Weight: 145 lb (66 kg; 10.4 st)
- Division: Featherweight (145 lb)
- Fighting out of: Los Angeles, California, United States
- Team: Subfighter MMA, Reign MMA; Alliance MMA; Black House
- Years active: 2009–2013

Mixed martial arts record
- Total: 7
- Wins: 6
- By knockout: 2
- By submission: 1
- By decision: 3
- Losses: 1
- By decision: 1

Other information
- Occupation: Professional MMA fighter (formerly), Financial analyst (formerly), Attorney
- University: Fresno State University; Old Dominion University
- Notable school: Hermitage High School
- Mixed martial arts record from Sherdog

Shanon Slack (born April 23, 1983) is a retired American mixed martial artist who competed in Bellator's featherweight division. He later attended law school, and currently works as an attorney.

== Background ==
Slack lived his early life in Chicago, but his family moved to Richmond, Virginia when he was in the 6th grade. In wrestling, he was a high school All American as a senior, wrestled at Cerritos College where he won All-American honors and the California JUCO title then Fresno State and Old Dominion and trained at the Olympic Training Center.

After the 2008 Olympic trials, Slack moved to California and began working as a financial analyst. Soon after, he gained interest in mixed martial arts and met Dominick Cruz. He trained with Cruz in California at the Alliance MMA then went on to coach top MMA fighters Junior Dos Santos, Rodrigo Noguiera, and Rogerio Noguiera in Brazil. Then, in 2009 he was invited to train at Black House, a Brazilian fighting team.

Slack was also one of the coaches of Team Cruz in The Ultimate Fighter: Live.

== Mixed martial arts career ==
=== Early career ===
Slack started his professional career in 2009. He compiled three straight victories in two years, before signing with Bellator in 2012.

=== Bellator MMA ===
Slack made his debut against Booker Arthur on May 18, 2012 at Bellator 69. He won via unanimous decision.

Slack faced Matt McCook on July 20, 2012 at Bellator 72. Slack had his first career's defeat via split decision (29-28 McCook, 29-28 Slack, 29-28 McCook).

Slack faced Sky Moiseichik on November 9, 2012 at Bellator 80. He won via unanimous decision.

Slack faced Josh Tyler on February 21, 2013 at Bellator 90. Tyler was defeated via submission due to a Peruvian necktie in the third round.

== Championships and accomplishments ==
=== Amateur wrestling ===
- USA Wrestling
  - University Greco-Roman Wrestling National Championships 141 lb: 3rd place out of Old Dominion University (2005)
- National Association of Intercollegiate Athletics
  - Virginia Intercollegiate Championship 141 lb: Champion out of Old Dominion University (2006)
- National Junior College Athletic Association
  - JUCO National Championship 141 lb: Champion out of Cerritos College (2002)
- California Community College Wrestling
  - California Community College Wrestling Championships 141 lb: Champion out of Cerritos College (2002)

University Wrestling National Championships 2006 4th place

== Personal life ==
As of 2013, he attended law school. He currently works as an attorney licensed in the states of California and New York.

== Mixed martial arts record ==
Professional record breakdown
7 matches	6 wins	1 loss
By knockout	2	0
By submission	1	0
By decision	3	1

Res.	Record	Opponent	Method	Event	Date	Round	Time	Location	Notes
Win	6–1	Josh Tyler	Submission (Peruvian necktie)	Bellator 90	February 21, 2013	3	1:56	Salt Lake City, Utah, United States	
Win	5–1	Sky Moiseichik	Decision (unanimous)	Bellator 80	November 9, 2012	3	5:00	Hollywood, Florida, United States	150 lb catchweight bout.
Loss	4–1	Matt McCook	Decision (split)	Bellator 72	July 20, 2012	3	5:00	Tampa, Florida, United States	
Win	4–0	Booker Arthur	Decision (unanimous)	Bellator 69	May 18, 2012	3	5:00	Lake Charles, Louisiana, United States	
Win	3–0	James Smith	TKO (punches)	CFC 8: Seasons Beatings	December 16, 2011	1	1:36	Lincoln, Nebraska, United States	
Win	2–0	Kevin Benson	TKO (punches)	Disorderly Conduct 2: The Return	May 21, 2011	1	2:05	Omaha, Nebraska, United States	
Win	1–0	Noe Quintanilla	Decision (unanimous)	Iron Will Fighting Championship 2	September 5, 2009	3	5:00	Johnstown, Pennsylvania, United States	
