= Ryan Martinez =

Ryan Martinez may refer to:

- Ryan Martinez (fighter)
- Ryan Martinez (politician)
