= Thiago Michel =

Brazilian mixed martial arts fighter

- Born: Thiago Michel Pereira Silva; May 15, 1984 (age 42); Belo Horizonte, Minas Gerais, Brazil
- Height: 6 ft 0 in (183 cm)
- Weight: 75 kg (165 lb; 11 st 11 lb)
- Division: Lightweight
- Reach: 74"
- Style: Kickboxing, Brazilian Jiu-Jitsu
- Fighting out of: Brazil
- Team: Ely Team
- Trainer: Ely Perez
- Rank: Black Belt in Muay Thai kickboxing
- Years active: 2006-present

Kickboxing record
- Total: 38
- Wins: 33
- Losses: 5
- Draws: 0

Mixed martial arts record
- Total: 14
- Wins: 10
- By knockout: 9
- By decision: 1
- Losses: 4
- By submission: 3
- By decision: 1

Other information
- Mixed martial arts record from Sherdog
- Last updated on: September 24, 2014

Thiago Michel Pereira Silva, a.k.a. Thiago Michel (born May 15, 1984) is a Brazilian professional kickboxer and mixed martial arts (MMA) fighter formally competed for Bellator Fighting Championships in their season six lightweight tournament.

== Personal life ==
Thiago Michel stated in an interview that when he was a child, he had a life-threatening throat infection and his father who taught him kickboxing starting at the age of 12, couldn't donate blood to his own son because he drank too much. This lead him never to drink again, strengthening their bond as father and son. Michel soon became a world kickboxing champion where he compiled 26 wins and just 2 defeats.

== Kickboxing career ==
Michel was selected to represent Brazil in the 73 kg/160 lb division at the first It's Showtime event held in the country. He went up against Steve Poort, an up-and-coming Dutch fighter, at It's Showtime 60 in São Paulo, Brazil and won by unanimous decision.

He competed in the eight man 70 kg/154 lb tournament at Tatneft Cup Brazil in São Paulo on December 8, 2012, losing to Carlos Roberto by unanimous decision in the quarter-finals.

He faced Miodrag Olar at SUPERKOMBAT New Heroes 2 on March 23, 2013, in a 76 kg/165 lb bout and won on points after dominating in a display of brute strength and size.

He defeated Paul Marfort by unanimous decision on the Glory 12: New York - Lightweight World Championship Tournament undercard in New York City, New York, US on November 23, 2013.

== Mixed martial arts career ==
=== Early career ===
Thiago Michel, who trains with world champion kickboxer Ely Perez, was the 2010 WAKO World Cup kickboxing champion at 165 lbs (75 kg) while also having a 7–1 record in MMA competition. He's also held Muay Thai titles and has posted knockouts in all nine of his career MMA wins.

Michel made his professional MMA debut on November 18, 2006, and has made a name for himself fighting mainly in his home country of Brazil. Michel won 6 of his first 7 fights before a 28-month break from the sport from 2008 to 2010. Before signing with Bellator, he amassed an impressive record of 9 wins and 2 losses. He was also ranked the number 1 lightweight prospect on Bloody Elbow's 2010 scouting report.

=== Bellator Fighting Championships ===
Thiago Michel is currently signed to Bellator Fighting Championships, competing in their lightweight division. Michel made his American debut at Bellator 62 on March 23, 2012, where he defeated fellow Brazilian Rene Nazare by split decision.

Michel faced Russian prospect Alexander Sarnavskiy in the opening round of the Bellator Lightweight Tournament on January 31, 2013, at Bellator 87. He lost via submission in the second round.

== Kickboxing titles ==
- 2014 WGP Kickboxing Champion -78 kg (1 Title Def.)
- WAKO Pro Pan American K-1 Rules Middleweight Championship -75.0 kg

== Kickboxing record ==
Kickboxing record
33 wins, 5 losses, 0 draws
Date	Result	Opponent	Event	Location	Method	Round	Time	Record
2016-05-08	Loss	(Brazil) Diego Gaúcho	WGP #30	Brazil	TKO	1		33-5
2015-10-31	Win	(Brazil) Fernando Nonato	WGP #27, Final	Rio de Janeiro, Brazil	Decision		3:00	33-4
Defends WGP Kickboxing Championship -78 kg.
2014-11-21	Loss	(Russia) Datsi Datsiev	Battle of Champions 7	Moscow, Russia	Decision (unanimous)	5	3:00	32-4
For WAKO-Pro K1 Rules Super Middleweight World Championship -78.1 kg.
2014-07-26	Win	(Brazil) Inaftali Gomes	WGP #21, Final	São Paulo, Brazil	Decision (unanimous)	3	3:00	32-3
Wins WGP Kickboxing Championship -78 kg.
2014-07-26	Win	(Brazil) Diego Sebastião	WGP #21, Semi Finals	São Paulo, Brazil	Decision (unanimous)	3	3:00	31-3
2014-04-26	Win	(Portugal) Ricardo Fernandes	WGP SUPER 4	São Paulo, Brazil	Decision (unanimous)	3	3:00	30-3
2013-11-23	Win	(Argentina) Paul Marfort	Glory 12: New York	New York City, New York, USA	Decision (unanimous)	3	3:00	29-3
2013-03-23	Win	(Romania) Miodrag Olar	SUPERKOMBAT New Heroes 2	São Caetano, Brazil	Decision (unanimous)	3	3:00	28-3
2012-12-08	Loss	(Brazil) Carlos Roberto	Tatneft Cup Brazil, Quarter Finals	São Paulo, Brazil	Decision (unanimous)	3	3:00	27-3
2012-11-10	Win	(Netherlands) Steve Poort	It's Showtime 60	São Paulo, Brazil	Decision (unanimous)	3	3:00	27-2

Amateur kickboxing record
Date	Result	Opponent	Event	Location	Method	Round	Time
2013-10-03	Loss	(Serbia) Stevan Živković	W.A.K.O World Championships 2013, Low-Kick Quarter Finals -81 kg	Guaruja, Brasil	Decision (unanimous)	3	2:00
2013-10-01	Win	(Turkey) Goksel Kotan	W.A.K.O World Championships 2013, Low-Kick 1st Round -81 kg	Guaruja, Brasil			
Legend: Win Loss Draw/no contest Notes

== Mixed martial arts record ==
Professional record breakdown
14 matches	10 wins	4 losses
By knockout	9	0
By submission	0	3
By decision	1	1

Res.	Record	Opponent	Method	Event	Date	Round	Time	Location	Notes
Loss	11–4	Alexander Sarnavskiy	Submission (rear-naked choke)	Bellator 87	January 31, 2013	2	3:43	Mount Pleasant, Michigan, United States	Bellator Season 8 Lightweight Tournament Quarterfinal
Win	11–3	David Gardner	TKO (knee to the body and punches)	Brasil Fight 6 - Brazil vs. USA	September 21, 2012	2	2:45	Belo Horizonte, Minas Gerais, Brazil	
Loss	10–3	Brent Weedman	Decision (split)	Bellator 66	April 20, 2012	3	5:00	Cleveland, Ohio, United States	Bellator Season 6 Lightweight Tournament Semifinal
Win	10–2	Rene Nazare	Decision (split)	Bellator 62	March 23, 2012	3	5:00	Laredo, Texas, United States	Bellator Season 6 Lightweight Tournament Quarterfinal
Win	9–2	Rodrigo Cavalheiro	TKO (punches)	Brazil Fight 5 - Back to Fight	September 3, 2011	1	n/a	Belo Horizonte, Minas Gerais, Brazil	
Win	8–2	Erick Barbosa	TKO (punches)	Brazil Fight 4 - The VIP Night	April 9, 2011	1	4:55	Nova Lima, Minas Gerais, Brazil	
Loss	7–2	Alessandro Ferreira	Submission (rear-naked choke)	Brazil Fight 3 - Minas Gerais vs. São Paulo	November 27, 2010	1	1:10	Belo Horizonte, Minas Gerais, Brazil	
Win	7–1	Felipe Olivieri	TKO (doctor stoppage)	Brazil Fight 2 - Minas Gerais vs. Rio de Janeiro	April 14, 2010	3	2:23	Belo Horizonte, Minas Gerais, Brazil	
Win	6–1	Flavio Toto	TKO (punches)	BHI - Belo Horizonte Interacademy	April 12, 2008	1	3:42	Contagem, Minas Gerais, Brazil	
Win	5–1	Murilo Filho	TKO (punches)	XFG - X Fight Games 3	December 15, 2007	1	2:45	Juiz de Fora, Minas Gerais, Brazil	
Loss	4–1	Ivan Iberico	Submission (armbar)	Juiz de Fora - Fight 5	November 24, 2007	1	n/a	Brazil	
Win	4–0	Damaso Pereira	KO (soccer kick)	FBC - Fight Brazil Combat	October 19, 2007	1	4:17	Montes Claros, Minas Gerais, Brazil	
Win	3–0	Luciano Pitbull	TKO (head kick)	FFMA - Festival Fighter Martial Arts	December 10, 2006	2	3:27	Belo Horizonte, Minas Gerais, Brazil	
Win	2–0	Rildo Benazar	TKO (punches)	MAUO - Martial Arts Union Open 4	November 26, 2006	2	4:07	Belo Horizonte, Minas Gerais, Brazil	
Win	1–0	Cesar Augusto Cunha Dias	TKO (punches)	X - Mix Martial Arts	November 18, 2006	1	3:36	Divinopolis, Minas Gerais, Brazil	
