= 2012 in Bellator MMA =

Mixed martial arts events

Information
- Promotion: Bellator MMA
- First date aired: March 9, 2012
- Last date aired: December 14, 2012

2012 in Bellator MMA was the sixth installment of the Bellator Fighting Championships, which began on March 9, 2012. The sixth season of Bellator was originally scheduled to begin on March 2, 2012. However, the debut was pushed back a week so it began with the show on March 9, 2012.

Mixed martial arts tournaments were held in five weight classes, including the bantamweight, featherweight, lightweight, welterweight and middleweight divisions.

== Bellator 60 ==
Bellator 60
- Date: March 9, 2012
- Venue: The Venue at Horseshoe Casino
- City: Hammond, Indiana

Bellator 60 took place on March 9, 2012 at The Venue at Horseshoe Casino in Hammond, Indiana. The event was distributed live in prime time by MTV2.

Background

Bellator 60 was expected to take place on March 2, but the season opener was pushed back one week.

Wagnney Fabiano was originally scheduled to face Ronnie Mann in the opening round of the Featherweight tournament; however, on March 1, 2012, Fabiano pulled out of the bout and was replaced by Mike Corey.

Genair da Silva was originally scheduled to face Alexandre Bezerra in the opening round of the Featherweight tournament; however, after weigh-in issues, da Silva was forced to pull out of the bout. He was replaced by Kenny Foster who was set to fight Bobby Reardanz on the undercard of this event.

=== Results ===
Main card
Weight class				Method	Round	Time	Notes
Featherweight	Pat Curran	def.	Joe Warren (c)	KO (punches)	3	1:25	(Note: For Bellator Featherweight Championship.)
Featherweight	Marlon Sandro	def.	Roberto Vargas	Submission (rear-naked choke)	1	3:35	(Note: Featherweight tournament quarterfinal.)
Featherweight	Alexandre Bezerra	def.	Kenny Foster	Submission (rear-naked choke)	2	4:57	(Note: Featherweight tournament quarterfinal.)
Featherweight	Daniel Mason-Straus	def.	Jeremy Spoon	Decision unanimous (29–28, 29–28, 30–27)	3	5:00	(Note: Featherweight tournament quarterfinal.)
Featherweight	Mike Corey	def.	Ronnie Mann	Decision unanimous (29–28, 29–28, 29–28)	3	5:00	(Note: Featherweight tournament quarterfinal.)
Preliminary
Bantamweight	Jake Nauracy	def.	Cory Galloway	Submission (rear-naked choke)	2	4:22
Catchweight (215 lb)	Travis Wiuff	def.	Anthony Gomez	Decision unanimous (29–28, 29–28, 29–28)	3	5:00
Catchweight (280 lb)	Sean McCorkle	def.	Richard White	Submission (neck crank)	1	1:02
Catchweight (165 lb)	Josh Shockley	def.	Shamar Bailey	Decision unanimous	3	5:00
Catchweight (148 lb)	Genair da Silva	def.	Bobby Reardanz	TKO (leg kicks and punches)	3	0:51

== Bellator 61 ==
Bellator 61
- Date: March 16, 2012
- Venue: Horseshoe Riverdome
- City: Bossier City, Louisiana

Bellator 61 took place on March 16, 2012 at Horseshoe Riverdome in Bossier City, Louisiana. The event was distributed live in prime time by MTV2.

Background

The event was to feature the rematch between season-five heavyweight tournament finalists Eric Prindle and Thiago Santos. Prindle and Santos met in the finals of Bellator's season-five heavyweight tourney, but the bout was ruled a no-contest when Santos inexplicably kicked a downed Prindle in the groin. However, on March 15, Bellator announced the fight had been pushed back a week to Bellator 62 due to Prindle having "flu-like symptoms."

This event marked the first time that Bellator Fighting Championships aired in Brazil on TV Esporte Interativo.

=== Results ===
Main card
Weight class				Method	Round	Time	Notes
Middleweight	Maiquel Falcao	def.	Norman Paraisy	Decision unanimous (30–27, 30–27, 30–27)	3	5:00	(Note: Middleweight tournament quarterfinal.)
Middleweight	Vyacheslav Vasilevsky	def.	Victor O'Donnell	Decision unanimous (29–28, 29–28, 29–28)	3	5:00	(Note: Middleweight tournament quarterfinal.)
Middleweight	Bruno Santos	def.	Giva Santana	Decision unanimous (30–27, 29–28, 29–28)	3	5:00	(Note: Middleweight tournament quarterfinal.)
Middleweight	Brian Rogers	def.	Vitor Vianna	KO (flying knee)	1	4:14	(Note: Middleweight tournament quarterfinal.)
Preliminary
Catchweight (165 lb)	Josh Quayhagen	def.	Brent Taylor	Decision unanimous (30–27, 30–27, 30–27)	3	5:00
Welterweight	Derrick Krantz	def.	Eric Scallan	Technical submission (D'arce choke)	1	3:01
Catchweight (140 lb)	Jason Sampson	def.	Jeremy Myers	Submission (rear-naked choke)	3	2:25
Middleweight	Trey Houston	def.	Jeremiah Riggs	Submission (armbar)	1	3:30	(Note: This bout aired on the MTV2 broadcast following the Santana vs. Santos fight.)

== Bellator 62 ==
Bellator 62
- Date: March 23, 2012
- Venue: Laredo Energy Arena
- City: Laredo, Texas

Bellator 62 took place on March 23, 2012 at Laredo Energy Arena in Laredo, Texas. The event was distributed live in prime time by MTV2.

Background

The event hosted the opening round of Bellator's Season Six Lightweight Tournament.

Eric Prindle and Thiago Santos were supposed to have their rematch of the Season Five Heavyweight Tournament Final on this card, after having been delayed a week from Bellator 61. Santos, however, failed to make weight and the bout was cancelled, and Prindle was awarded the tournament win by default. A scheduled fight between Cosmo Alexandre and Oscar de la Parra was also scrapped.

=== Results ===
Main card
Weight class				Method	Round	Time	Notes
Lightweight	Lloyd Woodard	def.	Patricky Freire	Submission (kimura)	2	1:46	(Note: Lightweight tournament quarterfinal.)
Lightweight	Rick Hawn	def.	Ricardo Tirloni	KO (punches)	1	2:36	(Note: Lightweight tournament quarterfinal.)
Lightweight	Brent Weedman	def.	J.J. Ambrose	Submission (Von Flue choke)	2	3:26	(Note: Lightweight tournament quarterfinal.)
Lightweight	Thiago Michel	def.	Rene Nazare	Decision split (29–28, 28–29, 29–28)	3	5:00	(Note: Lightweight tournament quarterfinal.)
Preliminary
Catchweight (162 lb)	Luis Vega	def.	Sonny Luque	Submission (arm-triangle choke)	1	3:43
Featherweight	Chris Jones	def.	Steven Peterson	Decision split (27–30, 29–28, 29–28)	3	5:00
Lightweight	Dave Jansen	def.	Jacob Kirwan	Decision unanimous (30–27, 29–28, 29–28)	3	5:00
Featherweight	Rad Martinez	def.	Doug Frey	TKO (punches)	1	4:08	(Note: This bout aired on the MTV2 broadcast following the Hawn vs. Tirloni fight.)
Catchweight (173 lb)	Sean Spencer	def.	Joseph Daily	Submission (rear-naked choke)	2	1:24

== Bellator 63 ==
Bellator 63
- Date: March 30, 2012
- Venue: Mohegan Sun Arena
- City: Uncasville, Connecticut

Bellator 63 took place on March 30, 2012 at Mohegan Sun Arena in Uncasville, Connecticut. The event was distributed live in prime time by MTV2.

Background

The event hosted the opening round of Bellator's Season Six Welterweight Tournament.

War Machine was expected to fight Karl Amoussou in the opening round of the welterweight tournament. However, War Machine was sentenced to a year in prison and was forced out of the bout and the tournament.

Brian Foster was scheduled to face David Rickels in the opening round of the welterweight tournament, but was not medically cleared for the event. Stepping in to fight Rickels was newcomer Jordan Smith.

=== Results ===
Main card
Weight class				Method	Round	Time	Notes
Welterweight	Karl Amoussou	def.	Chris Lozano	Submission (rear naked choke)	1	2:05	(Note: Welterweight tournament quarterfinal.)
Welterweight	Bryan Baker	def.	Carlos Alexandre Pereira	Decision split (29–28, 28–29, 29–28)	3	5:00	(Note: Welterweight tournament quarterfinal.)
Welterweight	David Rickels	def.	Jordan Smith	KO (punches)	1	0:22	(Note: Welterweight tournament quarterfinal.)
Welterweight	Ben Saunders	def.	Raul Amaya	Decision unanimous (30–26, 30–27, 30–27)	3	5:00	(Note: Welterweight tournament quarterfinal.)
Preliminary
Catchweight (165 lb)	Ryan Quinn	def.	Marc Stevens	Decision unanimous (29–28, 29–28, 30–27)	3	5:00
Featherweight	Matt Bessette	def.	Saul Almeida	Decision unanimous (30–27, 30–27, 29–28)	3	5:00
Middleweight	Dan Cramer	def.	Jeff Nader	Decision split (27–30, 29–28, 29–28)	3	5:00
Featherweight	Brandon Fleming	def.	Pete Rogers Jr.	Submission (Peruvian necktie)	1	3:39
Welterweight	Andrey Koreshkov	def.	Tiawan Howard	KO (punch)	1	1:26	(Note: This bout aired on the MTV2 broadcast following the Smith vs. Rickels fight.)
Women's (125 lb)	Munah Holland	def.	Marianna Kheyfets	KO (punches)	2	4:45

== Bellator 64 ==
Bellator 64
- Date: April 6, 2012
- Venue: Caesar’s Windsor
- City: Windsor, Ontario

Bellator 64 took place on April 6, 2012 at Caesar's Windsor in Windsor, Ontario. The event was distributed live in prime time by MTV2.

Background

The event hosted two of the opening round bouts of Bellator's Season Six Bantamweight Tournament.

=== Results ===
Main card
Weight class				Method	Round	Time	Notes
Welterweight	Ben Askren (c)	def.	Douglas Lima	Decision unanimous (50–45, 50–45, 50–45)	5	5:00	(Note: For Bellator Welterweight Championship.)
Featherweight	Marlon Sandro	def.	Alexandre Bezerra	Decision split (29–28, 28–29, 29–28)	3	5:00	(Note: Featherweight tournament semifinal.)
Bantamweight	Travis Marx	def.	Masakatsu Ueda	Decision unanimous (29–28, 29–28, 29–28)	3	5:00	(Note: Bantamweight tournament quarterfinal.)
Bantamweight	Hiroshi Nakamura	def.	Rodrigo Lima	Decision unanimous (29–27, 29–27, 29–27)	3	5:00	(Note: Bantamweight tournament quarterfinal.)
Preliminary
Catchweight (192 lb)	Elias Theodorou	def.	Rich Lictawa	TKO (retirement)	3	0:33
Catchweight (160 lb)	Kyle Prepolec	def.	Lance Snow	Submission (armbar)	1	2:54
Welterweight	Chad Laprise	def.	Josh Taveirne	Submission (triangle choke)	1	2:48
Featherweight	Mike Richman	def.	Chris Horodecki	KO (punches)	1	1:23
Welterweight	Nordine Taleb	def.	Matt Secor	Decision unanimous (30–27, 30–27, 30–24)	3	5:00
Lightweight	Jason Fischer	def.	Taylor Solomon	Technical Submission (rear naked choke)	3	4:59

== Bellator 65 ==
Bellator 65
- Date: April 13, 2012
- Venue: Boardwalk Hall
- City: Atlantic City, New Jersey

Bellator 65 took place on April 13, 2012 at Boardwalk Hall in Atlantic City, New Jersey. The event was distributed live in prime time by MTV2.

Background

Heavyweight champion Cole Konrad was originally slated to defend his title against Eric Prindle at this event. The fight, however, was moved to Bellator 70.

=== Results ===
Main card
Weight class				Method	Round	Time	Notes
Bantamweight	Eduardo Dantas	def.	Zach Makovsky (c)	Technical Submission (arm triangle choke)	2	3:26	(Note: For the Bellator Bantamweight Championship.)
Featherweight	Daniel Mason-Straus	def.	Mike Corey	Decision unanimous (30–27, 29–28, 29–28)	3	5:00	(Note: Featherweight tournament semifinal.)
Bantamweight	Luis Nogueira	def.	Alexis Vila	Decision unanimous (29–28, 29–28, 29–28)	3	5:00	(Note: Bantamweight tournament quarterfinal.)
Bantamweight	Marcos Galvao	def.	Ed West	Decision unanimous (30–27, 30–27, 30–27)	3	5:00	(Note: Bantamweight tournament quarterfinal.)
Preliminary
Featherweight	Kenny Foster	def.	Jay Haas	Submission (guillotine choke)	1	2:51
Lightweight	Will Martinez	def.	Terrell Hobbs	Submission (rear naked choke)	1	4:12
Middleweight	Duane Bastress	def.	Plinio Cruz	TKO (elbows)	2	2:52
Featherweight	Scott Heckman	def.	Lester Caslow	Submission (rear naked choke)	1	3:40
Welterweight	Lyman Good	def.	LeVon Maynard	KO (punch)	1	0:13	(Note: Season 7 Welterweight tournament qualifier.)
Welterweight	Kris McCray	def.	Ailton Barbosa	Decision split (29–28, 28–29, 29–28)	3	5:00	(Note: Season 7 Welterweight tournament qualifier.)
Lightweight	E. J. Brooks	def.	Mikhail Malyutin	Decision unanimous (30–27, 30–27, 30–26)	3	5:00

== Bellator 66 ==
Bellator 66
- Date: April 20, 2012
- Venue: I-X Center
- City: Cleveland, Ohio

Bellator 66 took place on April 20, 2012 at I-X Center in Cleveland, Ohio. The event was distributed live in prime time by MTV2.

Background

NAAFS women's champion Aisling Daly was originally scheduled to face Jessica Eye on this card. Daly withdrew from the bout due to an ear infection and was replaced by Anita Rodriguez.

Bruno Santos was originally scheduled to face Brian Rogers in a Middleweight tournament semifinal bout; however, on April 16, 2012, it was revealed that Santos had to withdraw due to a shoulder injury and was replaced by Bellator newcomer Andreas Spang.

Tyler Combs and Jason Dent were originally announced to face each other in a lightweight bout. Nevertheless, the fight did not materialize.

=== Results ===
Main card
Weight class				Method	Round	Time	Notes
Lightweight	Eddie Alvarez	def.	Shinya Aoki	TKO (punches)	1	2:14
Middleweight	Andreas Spang	def.	Brian Rogers	KO (punch)	2	3:34	(Note: Middleweight tournament semifinal.)
Middleweight	Maiquel Falcao	def.	Vyacheslav Vasilevsky	Decision unanimous (29–28, 29–28, 29–28)	3	5:00	(Note: Middleweight tournament semifinal.)
Lightweight	Rick Hawn	def.	Lloyd Woodard	KO (punch)	2	0:10	(Note: Lightweight tournament semifinal.)
Lightweight	Brent Weedman	def.	Thiago Michel	Decision split (28–29, 29–28, 29–28)	3	5:00	(Note: Lightweight tournament semifinal.)
Preliminary
Women's Bout (130 lb)	Jessica Eye	def.	Anita Rodriguez	Decision unanimous (30–27, 30–27, 30–27)	3	5:00
Light Heavyweight	John Hawk	def.	Marcus Vanttinen	Decision split (27–30, 29–28, 29–28)	3	5:00
Light Heavyweight	Attila Vegh	def.	Dan Spohn	Decision split (29–28, 28–29, 30–27)	3	5:00
Featherweight	Frank Caraballo (ic)	def.	Donny Walker (c)	KO (knee)	4	2:25	(Note: For unified NAAFS Featherweight championship.)
Lightweight	Julian Lane	def.	Joe Heiland	Submission (guillotine choke)	1	2:49

== Bellator 67 ==
Bellator 67
- Date: May 4, 2012
- Venue: Casino Rama
- City: Rama, Ontario

Bellator 67 took place on May 4, 2012 at Casino Rama in Rama, Ontario, Canada. The event was distributed live in prime time by MTV2.

Background

Bellator Lightweight champion, Michael Chandler, competed in a non-title "Super Fight" against PRIDE, UFC, and DREAM veteran, Akihiro Gono, at this event.

=== Results ===
Main card (MTV2)
Weight class				Method	Round	Time	Notes
Lightweight	Michael Chandler	def.	Akihiro Gono	TKO (punches)	1	0:56
Welterweight	Bryan Baker	def.	Ben Saunders	Decision unanimous (29–28, 30–27, 30–27)	3	5:00	(Note: Welterweight tournament semifinal.)
Heavyweight	Damian Grabowski	def.	Dave Huckaba	Decision unanimous (29–28, 29–28, 29–28)	3	5:00
Welterweight	Ryan Ford	def.	Luis Santos	TKO (knee & punches)	2	1:24
Preliminary
Lightweight	Cosmo Alexandre	def.	Lorawnt-T Nelson	Decision unanimous	3	5:00
Bantamweight	David Harris	def.	Nick Kirk	Decision unanimous	3	5:00
Catchweight (148 lb)	Will Romero	def.	Matt Veal	TKO (knees & punches)	2	4:25
Catchweight (180 lb)	Nordine Taleb	def.	Matt MacGrath	TKO (punches)	2	2:30
Welterweight	Dom O'Grady	def.	Nathan Gunn	Submission (armbar)	2	4:51

== Bellator 68 ==
Bellator 68
- Date: May 11, 2012
- Venue: Caesars Hotel and Casino
- City: Atlantic City, New Jersey

Bellator 68 took place on May 11, 2012 at Caesars Hotel and Casino in Atlantic City, New Jersey. The event was distributed live in prime time by MTV2.

Background

Kurt Pellegrino was scheduled to fight Marcin Held at this event. However, on March 13, Pellegrino suffered a knee injury and was forced to pull out of the bout. Phillipe Nover had stepped in as Pellegrino's replacement, but was eventually replaced by Bellator newcomer Derrick Kennington.

Eddie Fyvie and Jeff Lentz were originally scheduled to compete in a featherweight bout; however, the fight did not materialize.

Marius Žaromskis versus Waachiim Spiritwolf was originally going to be contested at welterweight; however, Spiritwolf failed to make the 171 pounds cut off allowance and the fight was changed to a catchweight bout at 172 pounds.

A catchweight bout at 230 pounds between Carmelo Marrero and Seth Petruzelli was cancelled the day of the show due to an illness by Petruzelli.

=== Results ===
Main card (MTV2)
Weight class				Method	Round	Time	Notes
Featherweight	Daniel Mason-Straus	def.	Marlon Sandro	Decision unanimous (29–28, 30–27, 30–27)	3	5:00	(Note: Featherweight Tournament Final.)
Bantamweight	Marcos Galvão	def.	Travis Marx	Decision unanimous (29–28, 29–28, 29–28)	3	5:00	(Note: Bantamweight tournament semifinal.)
Lightweight	Marcin Held	def.	Derrick Kennington	Submission (heel hook)	1	2:08
Catchweight (172 lb)	Marius Žaromskis	def.	Waachiim Spiritwolf	TKO (doctor stoppage)	2	5:00
Preliminary
Lightweight	Don Carlo-Clauss	def.	Jacob Kirwan	Decision split	3	5:00
Catchweight (175 lb)	Aung La N Sang	def.	Jesus Martinez	TKO (punches)	1	0:36
Bantamweight	Anthony Leone	def.	Claudio Ledesma	Decision split	3	5:00
Middleweight	Francois Ambang	def.	Gregory Milliard	Decision split	3	5:00

== Bellator 69 ==
Bellator 69
- Date: May 18, 2012
- Venue: L'Auberge du Lac Casino Resort
- City: Lake Charles, Louisiana

Bellator 69 took place on May 18, 2012 at the L'Auberge du Lac Casino Resort in Lake Charles, Louisiana. The event was distributed live in prime time by MTV2.

Background

This event held the finals of the Season Six Middleweight tournament.

Heavyweights Ron Sparks and Kevin Asplund were to compete in a tournament eliminator bout for a spot in the Bellator Season Seven Heavyweight tournament. However, the bout was cancelled the day of the show due to Sparks feeling ill.

With Hector Lombard leaving for the Ultimate Fighting Championship, the Middleweight title was vacated. On April 25, 2012, Bellator CEO Bjorn Rebney announced that the winner of the Middleweight tournament finale between Maiquel Falcão and Andreas Spang will face Alexander Shlemenko to crown the company's new Middleweight champion.

=== Results ===
Main card (MTV2)
Weight class				Method	Round	Time	Notes
Middleweight	Maiquel Falcão	def.	Andreas Spang	Decision unanimous (29–27, 29–27, 29–27)	3	5:00	(Note: Middleweight tournament final.)
Welterweight	Karl Amoussou	def.	David Rickels	Decision split (28–29, 29–28, 29–28)	3	5:00	(Note: Welterweight tournament semifinal.)
Women's 115 lb	Jessica Aguilar	def.	Megumi Fujii	Decision unanimous (29–28, 29–28, 29–28)	3	5:00
Heavyweight	Mark Holata	def.	Abe Wagner	Verbal Submission (straight ankle lock)	1	2:24
Preliminary
Catchweight (158 lb)	Josh Quayhagen	def.	Cliff Wright	Decision unanimous	3	5:00
Featherweight	Shanon Slack	def.	Booker Arthur	Decision unanimous	3	5:00
Welterweight	Andrey Koreshkov	def.	Derrick Krantz	TKO (strikes)	3	0:51
Light Heavyweight	Rich Hale	def.	Josh Burns	TKO (punches)	1	0:38
Lightweight	E. J. Brooks	def.	Kalvin Hackney	Decision unanimous	3	5:00

== Bellator 70 ==
Bellator 70
- Date: May 25, 2012
- Venue: Orleans Convention Center
- City: New Orleans, Louisiana

Bellator 70 took place on May 25, 2012 at the Orleans Convention Center in New Orleans, Louisiana. The event was distributed live in prime time by MTV2.

Background

Heavyweight champion Cole Konrad was originally slated to defend his title against Eric Prindle at Bellator 65. Prindle, however, was injured and the fight was moved to this card, Bellator 70.

=== Results ===
Main card (MTV2)
Weight class				Method	Round	Time	Notes
Lightweight	Rick Hawn	def.	Brent Weedman	Decision unanimous (29–28, 30–27, 30–27)	3	5:00	(Note: Lightweight Tournament Final.)
Heavyweight	Cole Konrad (c)	def.	Eric Prindle	Submission (kimura)	1	1:00	(Note: For the Bellator Heavyweight Championship.)
Bantamweight	Luis Nogueira	def.	Hiroshi Nakamura	KO (punches)	3	1:58	(Note: Bantamweight tournament semifinal.)
Catchweight (157 lb)	Rich Clementi	def.	Derek Campos	Submission (guillotine choke)	1	4:18
Preliminary
Catchweight (173 lb)	Keith Schneider	def.	Josh Shockley	Submission (armbar)	1	0:59
Welterweight	A.J. Matthews	def.	Charlie Rader	KO (soccer kick)	2	3:34
Catchweight (190 lb)	Kelvin Tiller	def.	Jeremiah Riggs	Verbal submission (kimura)	3	3:38
Middleweight	Jonas Billstein	def.	Mike Seal	Technical submission (rear naked choke)	1	2:55
Bantamweight	Derek Arcement	def.	Blake Dufour	Decision unanimous	3	5:00

== Tournaments ==
=== Middleweight tournament bracket ===
Quarterfinals
(Brazil)	Maiquel Falcão	UD
(France)	Norman Paraisy	3
(Russia)	Vyacheslav Vasilevsky	UD
(United States)	Victor O'Donnell	3
(Brazil)	Bruno Santos	UD
(Brazil)	Giva Santana	3
(United States)	Brian Rogers	KO
(Brazil)	Vitor Vianna	1

Semifinals
(Brazil)	Maiquel Falcão	UD
(Russia)	Vyacheslav Vasilevsky	3
(Sweden)	Andreas Spang	KO
(United States)	Brian Rogers	2

Finals
(Brazil)	Maiquel Falcão	UD
(Sweden)	Andreas Spang	3

1: Bruno Santos was set to face Brian Rogers in the semifinal round of the middleweight tournament. However, Santos had to withdraw due to a shoulder injury and was replaced by Andreas Spang.

=== Welterweight tournament bracket ===
Quarterfinals
(France)	Karl Amoussou	SUB
(United States)	Chris Lozano	1
(United States)	David Rickels	KO
(United States)	Jordan Smith	1
(United States)	Bryan Baker	SD
(Brazil)	Carlos Alexandre Pereira	3
(United States)	Ben Saunders	UD
(United States)	Raul Amaya	3

Semifinals
(France)	Karl Amoussou	SD
(United States)	David Rickels	3
(United States)	Bryan Baker	UD
(United States)	Ben Saunders	3

Finals
(France)	Karl Amoussou	SUB
(United States)	Bryan Baker	1

1: War Machine was set to appear in the welterweight tournament. However, War Machine was sentenced to a year in prison and was forced out of the tournament. He was replaced by Chris Lozano.
2: Brian Foster was set to appear in the welterweight tournament. However, Foster was not medically cleared to fight. He was replaced by Jordan Smith.

=== Lightweight tournament bracket ===
Quarterfinals
(United States)	Rick Hawn	KO
(Brazil)	Ricardo Tirloni	1
(United States)	Lloyd Woodard	SUB
(Brazil)	Patricky Freire	2
(United States)	Brent Weedman	SUB
(United States)	J.J. Ambrose	2
(Brazil)	Thiago Michel	SD
(Brazil)	Rene Nazare	3

Semifinals
(United States)	Rick Hawn	KO
(United States)	Lloyd Woodard	2
(United States)	Brent Weedman	SD
(Brazil)	Thiago Michel	3

Finals
(United States)	Rick Hawn	UD
(United States)	Brent Weedman	3

=== Featherweight tournament bracket ===
Quarterfinals
(United States)	Daniel Straus	UD
(United States)	Jeremy Spoon	3
(United States)	Mike Corey	UD
(England)	Ronnie Mann	3
(Brazil)	Marlon Sandro	SUB
(United States)	Roberto Vargas	1
(Brazil)	Alexandre Bezerra	SUB
(United States)	Kenny Foster	2

Semifinals
(United States)	Daniel Straus	UD
(United States)	Mike Corey	3
(Brazil)	Marlon Sandro	SD
(Brazil)	Alexandre Bezerra	3

Finals
(United States)	Daniel Straus	UD
(Brazil)	Marlon Sandro	3

1: Wagnney Fabiano was expected to appear in the featherweight tournament. However, Fabiano suffered an undisclosed injury and was forced out of the tournament. Mike Corey filled in as Fabiano's replacement.
2: Genair da Silva was expected to appear in the featherweight tournament. However, after weigh-in issues arose at Bellator 60, da Silva was forced out of the tournament. Kenny Foster, who was slated to fight on the event's undercard, replaced da Silva.

=== Bantamweight tournament bracket ===
Quarterfinals
(Brazil)	Marcos Galvao	UD
(United States)	Ed West	3
(United States)	Travis Marx	UD
(Japan)	Masakatsu Ueda	3
(Brazil)	Luis Nogueira	UD
(Cuba)	Alexis Vila	3
(Japan)	Hiroshi Nakamura	UD
(Brazil)	Rodrigo Lima	3

Semifinals
(Brazil)	Marcos Galvao	UD
(United States)	Travis Marx	3
(Brazil)	Luis Nogueira	TKO
(Japan)	Hiroshi Nakamura	3

Finals
(Brazil)	Marcos Galvao	TKO
(Brazil)	Luis Nogueira	2

== Bellator 71 ==
Bellator 71
- Promotion: Bellator Fighting Championships
- Date: June 22, 2012
- Venue: Mountaineer Casino, Racetrack and Resort
- City: (United States) Chester, West Virginia

Event chronology
Bellator 70	Bellator 71	Bellator 72

Bellator 71 was a mixed martial arts event held by Bellator Fighting Championships. The event took place on June 22, 2012 at the Mountaineer Casino, Racetrack and Resort in Chester, West Virginia. The card was part of Bellator's annual Summer Series and featured the opening round fights in the Summer Series Light Heavyweight Tournament. The event was distributed live in prime time by EPIX and online at SpikeTV.com.

Background

A preliminary bout between E. J. Brooks and Joey Holt was originally announced by the promotion. However, the bout failed to materialize.

Richard Hale was supposed to face Beau Tribolet in the Tournament Quarterfinal, but was not cleared to compete so Tim Carpenter (who originally was supposed to face John Hawk) stepped in as a last minute replacement.

=== Results ===
Main card (EPIX and SpikeTV.com)
Weight class				Method	Round	Time	Notes
Light Heavyweight	Travis Wiuff	def.	Chris Davis	TKO (Strikes)	1	4:12	(Note: Light Heavyweight tournament quarterfinal.)
Light Heavyweight	Attila Vegh	def.	Zelg Galesic	Submission (Rear Naked Choke)	1	1:00	(Note: Light Heavyweight tournament quarterfinal.)
Light Heavyweight	Tim Carpenter	def.	Beau Tribolet	Submission (Armbar)	2	4:51	(Note: Light Heavyweight tournament quarterfinal.)
Light Heavyweight	Emanuel Newton	def.	Roy Boughton	Submission (Rear Naked Choke)	2	0:49	(Note: Light Heavyweight tournament quarterfinal.)
Heavyweight	Brett Rogers	def.	Kevin Asplund	TKO (Doctor's Stoppage)	2	5:00
Preliminary
Light Heavyweight	Josh Stansbury	def.	Dan Spohn	Submission (Guillotine Choke)	1	2:30
Middleweight	Jason Butcher	def.	Duane Bastress	Submission (Triangle Choke)	1	1:03
Featherweight	Neil Johnson	def.	Brylan Van Artsdalen	Submission (Rear Naked Choke)	2	4:29
Catchweight (190 lb)	Kevin Zalac	def.	Chris Goldbaugh	Decision unanimous	3	5:00

== Bellator 72 ==
Bellator 72
- Promotion: Bellator Fighting Championships
- Date: July 20, 2012
- Venue: USF Sun Dome
- City: Tampa, Florida

Event chronology
Bellator 71	Bellator 72	Bellator 73

Bellator 72 was a mixed martial arts event held by Bellator Fighting Championships. The event took place on July 20, 2012 at USF Sun Dome in Tampa, Florida. The card was part of Bellator's annual Summer Series and featured the semifinal round fights in the Summer Series Tournament. The event was distributed live in prime time by EPIX and MTV2.

Background

Paul Daley made his promotional debut at this event against Rudy Bears in a welterweight fight.

Marius Žaromskis and Waachiim Spiritwolf competed in a rematch - their third fight together - following a controversial doctor stoppage in their previous Bellator fight in May 2012.

A heavyweight bout between Chris Barnett and Tom Sauer was initially announced by the promotion for this card. However, the bout failed to materialize.

=== Results ===
Main card (EPIX and MTV2)
Weight class				Method	Round	Time	Notes
Welterweight	Karl Amoussou	def.	Bryan Baker	Submission (inverted heel hook)	1	0:56	(Note: Welterweight tournament final.)
Welterweight	Paul Daley	def.	Rudy Bears	TKO (Punches)	1	2:45
Light Heavyweight	Travis Wiuff	def.	Tim Carpenter	Decision unanimous	3	5:00	(Note: Light Heavyweight tournament semifinal.)
Light Heavyweight	Attila Vegh	def.	Emanuel Newton	Decision split	3	5:00	(Note: Light Heavyweight tournament semifinal.)
Welterweight	Marius Žaromskis	def.	Waachiim Spiritwolf	Decision split	3	5:00
Preliminary
Catchweight (150 lb)	Paul Barrow	def.	Jason Carapelluci	Submission (Rear Naked Choke)	3	0:46
Catchweight (178 lb)	Ben Saunders	def.	Brian Warren	TKO (knees)	1	0:22	(Note: Aired on the main broadcast after the Daley/Bears fight.)
Welterweight	Raul Amaya	def.	Kenny Moss	Verbal submission (Shoulder Injury)	2	0:30
Featherweight	Matt McCook	def.	Shanon Slack	Decision split	3	5:00
Welterweight	Julien Williams	def.	Ryan DeRocher	Technical submission (Arm-Triangle Choke)	2	1:32

== Bellator 73 ==
Bellator 73
- Promotion: Bellator Fighting Championships
- Date: August 24, 2012
- Venue: Harrah's Tunica Hotel and Casino
- City: Tunica, Mississippi

Event chronology
Bellator 72	Bellator 73

Bellator 73 was a mixed martial arts event held by Bellator Fighting Championships. The event took place on August 24, 2012 at Harrah's Tunica Hotel and Casino in Tunica, Mississippi. The card was part of Bellator's annual Summer Series and featured the final round fights in the Summer Series Tournament. The event was distributed live in prime time by MTV2.

Background

This fight card was to feature Pat Curran making the first defense of his Featherweight title against Bellator season 4 Featherweight tournament winner Patricio Freire. However, on August 14, 2012, it was announced that Curran had suffered an injury and the bout was to be rescheduled for a later date.

The card featured the finals of the season 6 Bantamweight tournament and 2012 Summer Series Light Heavyweight tournament.

Marcus "Lelo" Aurelio was originally supposed to make his promotional debut on this card, but was removed due to an injury. His original opponent, Amaechi Oselukwue, instead met replacement Kelvin Tiller. Additionally, a heavyweight bout between Maurice Jackson and Chris Miller was announced, but failed to materialize.

=== Results ===
Main card (MTV2)
Weight class				Method	Round	Time	Notes
Light Heavyweight	Attila Vegh	def.	Travis Wiuff	KO (punches)	1	0:25	(Note: Light Heavyweight tournament final.)
Bantamweight	Marcos Galvao	def.	Luis Nogueira	TKO (elbows)	2	4:20	(Note: Bantamweight tournament final.)
Light Heavyweight	Mike Mucitelli	def.	Matt Van Buren	Submission (triangle choke)	1	3:01
Heavyweight	Mike Wessel	def.	Ryan Martinez	Decision split	3	5:00
Preliminary
Lightweight	Zach Underwood	def.	Chris Coggins	Decision unanimous	3	5:00
Featherweight	Brian Hall	def.	Jay Black	TKO (punches)	1	0:44
Welterweight	Andy Uhrich	def.	Joe Williams	Decision unanimous	3	5:00
Catchweight (190 lb)	Kelvin Tiller	def.	Amaechi Oselukwue	TKO (punches)	2	4:21
Light Heavyweight	Jacob Noe	def.	Brian Albin	TKO (doctor stoppage)	1	5:00
Lightweight	Cosmo Alexandre	def.	Harry Johnson	TKO (knee to the body)	2	0:39

== Light Heavyweight tournament bracket ==
Quarterfinals
(Slovakia)	Attila Vegh	SUB
(Croatia)	Zelg Galesic	1
(United States)	Emanuel Newton	SUB
(United States)	Roy Boughton	1
(United States)	Travis Wiuff	TKO
(United States)	Chris Davis	1
(United States)	Tim Carpenter	SUB
(United States)	Beau Tribolet	2

Semifinals
(Slovakia)	Attila Vegh	SD
(United States)	Emanuel Newton	3
(United States)	Travis Wiuff	UD
(United States)	Tim Carpenter	3

Finals
(Slovakia)	Attila Vegh	KO
(United States)	Travis Wiuff	1

1: Tim Carpenter replaced Richard Hale.

== Bellator 74 ==
Bellator 74
- Date: September 28, 2012
- Venue: Caesars Atlantic City
- City: Atlantic City, New Jersey

Bellator 74 took place on September 28, 2012 at Caesars Atlantic City in Atlantic City, New Jersey. The event was distributed live in prime time by MTV2. It was the season debut of season seven.

Background

Bellator 74 hosted the opening round in the Bellator Season Seven Welterweight Tournament.

Alexandre Bezerra was originally scheduled to face The Ultimate Fighter: Live alumni Jeff Smith. However, Smith failed his pre-fight medical and was replaced by Matt McCook in a 157 lb catchweight fight. Plinio Cruz and Kelvin Tiller were also originally announced to meet in a middleweight fight, but the bout was cancelled after Cruz sustained an injury in training.

Results

Main card
Weight class				Method	Round	Time	Notes
Welterweight	Lyman Good	def.	Jim Wallhead	Decision (unanimous) (29–27, 29–27, 29–27)	3	5:00	(Note: Welterweight Tournament Quarterfinal)
Welterweight	Marius Žaromskis	def.	Nordine Taleb	Decision (unanimous) (30–27, 29–27, 29–27)	3	5:00	(Note: Welterweight Tournament Quarterfinal)
Welterweight	Michail Tsarev	def.	Tim Welch	Submission (rear-naked choke)	2	1:57	(Note: Welterweight Tournament Quarterfinal)
Welterweight	Andrey Koreshkov	def.	Jordan Smith	Decision (unanimous) (29–28, 29–28, 29–28)	3	5:00	(Note: Welterweight Tournament Quarterfinal)
Preliminary card
Featherweight	Will Martinez	def.	Casey Johnson	Submission (rear-naked choke)	1	2:27
Women's Flyweight	Michelle Ould	def.	Munah Holland	Decision (unanimous) (30–27, 30–27, 29–28)	3	5:00
Catchweight (157 lb)	Alexandre Bezerra	def.	Matt McCook	Submission (rear-naked choke)	1	3:04
Lightweight	Phillipe Nover	def.	Derrick Kennington	Technical submission (rear-naked choke)	2	4:20
Featherweight	Brylan Van Artsdalen	def.	Jay Haas	Submission (guillotine choke)	1	1:03
Bantamweight	Claudio Ledesma	def.	Kenny Foster	Decision (unanimous) (30–27, 30–27, 30–27)	3	5:00

== Bellator 75 ==
Bellator 75
- Date: October 5, 2012
- Venue: Horseshoe Casino
- City: Hammond, Indiana

Bellator 75 took place on October 5, 2012 at The Venue in the Horseshoe Casino in Hammond, Indiana. The event was distributed live in prime time by MTV2.

Background

Bellator 75 hosted the opening round in the Bellator Season Seven Heavyweight Tournament.

The event featured the long-planned rematch between season-five heavyweight tournament finalists Eric Prindle and Thiago Santos. Prindle and Santos met in the finals of Bellator's season-five heavyweight tourney, but the bout was ruled a no-contest when Santos inexplicably kicked a downed Prindle in the groin. The initial rematch was scheduled for Bellator 61. However, on March 15, Bellator announced the fight had been pushed back a week to Bellator 62 due to Prindle having "flu-like symptoms." The following week Santos failed to make weight and the bout was cancelled, and Prindle was awarded the tournament win by default. Incredibly, the fourth scheduled meeting of these two fighters again ended in controversy as this time Prindle accidentally kicked Santos in the groin in round one.

Results

Main card
Weight class				Method	Round	Time	Notes
Heavyweight	Thiago Santos	def.	Eric Prindle	DQ (groin strike)	1	4:51	(Note: Heavyweight Tournament Quarterfinal)
Heavyweight	Alexander Volkov	def.	Brett Rogers	Decision (unanimous) (30–27, 30–27, 30–27)	3	5:00	(Note: Heavyweight Tournament Quarterfinal)
Heavyweight	Richard Hale	def.	Mike Wessel	TKO (punches)	1	1:19	(Note: Heavyweight Tournament Quarterfinal)
Heavyweight	Vinicius Queiroz	def.	Mark Holata	Submission (armbar)	1	3:26	(Note: Heavyweight Tournament Quarterfinal)
Preliminary card
Bantamweight	Chase Beebe	def.	Bo Harris	Decision (unanimous)	3	5:00
Heavyweight	Ryan Martinez	def.	Manny Lara	Majority decision	3	5:00
Welterweight	Joe Williams	def.	Rod Montoya	Submission (rear naked choke)	1	3:17
Catchweight (178 lb)	Jason Graves	def.	Rafał Skibiński	Submission (rear naked choke)	1	2:50
Catchweight (210 lb)	Anthony Gomez	def.	Jose Medina	Submission (rear naked choke)	1	2:32
Catchweight (148 lb)	Cliff Wright	def.	Bobby Reardanz	Submission (rear naked choke)	1	3:39

== Bellator 76 ==
Bellator 76
- Date: October 12, 2012
- Venue: Caesars Windsor
- City: Windsor, Ontario, Canada

Bellator 76 took place on October 12, 2012 at Caesars Windsor in Windsor, Ontario, Canada. The event was distributed live in prime time by MTV2.

Background

Bellator 76 hosted the opening round in the Bellator Season Seven Featherweight Tournament.

Fight card

Main card
Weight class				Method	Round	Time	Notes
Lightweight	Eddie Alvarez	def.	Patricky Freire	KO (head kick and punches)	1	4:54
Featherweight	Rad Martinez	def.	Nazareno Malegarie	Decision (unanimous) (30–27, 30–27, 30–27)	3	5:00	(Note: Featherweight Tournament Quarterfinal)
Featherweight	Wagnney Fabiano	def.	Akop Stepanyan	Submission (armbar)	1	3:24	(Note: Featherweight Tournament Quarterfinal)
Featherweight	Mike Richman	def.	Jeremy Spoon	KO (head kick and punches)	1	0:23	(Note: Featherweight Tournament Quarterfinal)
Featherweight	Shahbulat Shamhalaev	def.	Cody Bollinger	TKO (punches)	1	4:49	(Note: Featherweight Tournament Quarterfinal)
Preliminary card
Featherweight	Magomedrasul Khasbulaev	def.	Nayeb Hezam	TKO (punches)	1	0:24	(Note: Featherweight Tournament Reserve Bout)
Featherweight	Jason Fischer	def.	Kyle Prepolec	Submission (arm-triangle choke)	3	3:19
Lightweight	Chad Laprise	def.	Ainsley Robinson	Decision (unanimous) (30–27, 30–27, 30–27)	3	5:00
Middleweight	Ali Mokdad	def.	Simon Marini	Decision (unanimous) (29–28, 29–28, 29–28)	3	5:00
Welterweight	Dom O'Grady	def.	A.J. Matthews	Decision (split) (29–28, 28–29, 29–28)	3	5:00

== Bellator 77 ==
Bellator 77
- Date: October 19, 2012
- Venue: Reading Eagle Theater
- City: Reading, Pennsylvania

Bellator 77 took place on October 19, 2012 at the Reading Eagle Theater in the Sovereign Center in Reading, Pennsylvania. The event was distributed live in prime time by MTV2.

Background

Bellator 77 hosted the opening round in the Bellator Season Seven Lightweight Tournament.

Results

Main card
Weight class				Method	Round	Time	Notes
Lightweight	Rich Clementi	def.	Alexander Sarnavskiy	Decision (split) (29–28, 28–29, 29–28)	3	5:00	(Note: Lightweight Tournament Quarterfinal)
Lightweight	Dave Jansen	def.	Magomed Saadulaev	Submission (guillotine choke)	3	0:41	(Note: Lightweight Tournament Quarterfinal)
Lightweight	Marcin Held	def.	Murad Machaev	Decision (unanimous) (29–28, 29–28, 29–28)	3	5:00	(Note: Lightweight Tournament Quarterfinal)
Lightweight	Ricardo Tirloni	def.	Rene Nazare	Submission (D'arce choke)	2	1:14	(Note: Lightweight Tournament Quarterfinal)
Preliminary card
Flyweight	Matthew Lozano	def	Dave Morgan	Submission (inverted triangle choke)	2	2:28
Catchweight (240)	Lew Polley	def.	Carmelo Marrero	Decision (unanimous) (29–28, 30–27, 29–28)	3	5:00
Lightweight	Darrell Horcher	def.	E. J. Brooks	KO (punch)	1	0:21	(Note: Lightweight Tournament Reserve Bout)
Catchweight (157)	Cosmo Alexandre	def.	Mike Bannon	TKO (doctor stoppage)	2	5:00
Middleweight	Duane Bastress	def.	Ariel Sepulveda	Decision (split) (29–28, 28–29, 29–28)	3	5:00
Featherweight	Brett Martinez	def.	Eric Albright	Submission (guillotine choke)	2	3:28

== Bellator 78 ==
Bellator 78
- Date: October 26, 2012
- Venue: Nutter Center
- City: Dayton, Ohio

Bellator 78 took place on October 26, 2012 at the Nutter Center in Dayton, Ohio. The event was distributed live in prime time by MTV2.

Background

Bellator 78 hosted the semi-finals of Bellator's Season Seven Welterweight Tournament.

Results

Main card
Weight class				Method	Round	Time	Notes
Welterweight	Lyman Good	def.	Michail Tsarev	TKO (punches)	2	3:54	(Note: Welterweight Tournament Semifinal)
Welterweight	Andrey Koreshkov	def.	Marius Zaromskis	TKO (punches)	1	2:14	(Note: Welterweight Tournament Semifinal)
Featherweight	Daniel Mason-Straus	def.	Alvin Robinson	Submission (rear-naked choke)	2	4:51
Middleweight	Brian Rogers	def.	Dominique Steele	Decision (unanimous) (30–27, 30–27, 30–27)	3	5:00
Preliminary card
Women's Flyweight	Zoila Gurgel	def.	Casey Noland	Decision (unanimous) (29–28, 29–28, 29–28)	3	5:00	(Note: Non-title bout)
Lightweight	Rob Hanna	def.	Rocky Edwards	Decision (split) (29–28, 28–29, 29–28)	3	5:00
Catchweight (140 lb)	Justin McNally	def.	David Blattman	Technical submission (triangle choke)	1	0:38
Middleweight	Mikkel Parlo	def.	Jared Combs	KO (punches)	1	3:51
Middleweight	Billy Horne	def.	Trey Houston	Submission (rear naked choke)	1	3:30
Middleweight	Jason Butcher	def.	Shaun Asher	Submission (guillotine choke)	1	1:32

== Bellator 79 ==
Bellator 79
- Date: November 2, 2012
- Venue: Casino Rama
- City: Rama, Ontario

Bellator 79 took place on November 2, 2012 at Casino Rama in Rama, Ontario. The event was distributed live in prime time by MTV2.

Background

Bellator 79 hosted the one half of the semi-finals of Bellator's Season Seven Heavyweight Tournament and Featherweight Tournament.

Paul Daley was originally scheduled for this event, but was taken off the card due to concerns that he would be stopped at Canada border entry due to incomplete paperwork needed to secure a visa.

Results

Main card
Weight class				Method	Round	Time	Notes
Heavyweight	Richard Hale	def.	Thiago Santos	TKO (punches)	1	3:31	(Note: Heavyweight Tournament Semifinal)
Featherweight	Shahbulat Shamhalaev	def.	Mike Richman	TKO (punches)	1	1:45	(Note: Featherweight Tournament Semifinal)
Catchweight (180 lb)	Douglas Lima	def.	Jacob Ortiz	TKO (head kick and knee)	3	4:50
Welterweight	Ryan Ford	def.	Kyle Baker	Decision (unanimous) (29–28, 30–27, 30–27)	3	5:00
Preliminary card
Heavyweight	Josh Appelt	def.	Ed Carpenter	Submission (rear naked choke)	1	3:20
Catchweight (173 lb)	Christ Franck	def.	Marcus Aurélio	Decision (split) (29–28, 28–29, 29–28)	3	5:00
Heavyweight	Vitaly Minakov	def.	Vladimir Starcencov	TKO (punches)	2	0:27
Lightweight	Magomedrasul Khasbulaev	def.	Josh Pulsifer	Submission (rear naked choke)	1	3:30
Lightweight	Guillaume DeLorenzi	def.	Jonny Carson	Submission (rear naked choke)	1	4:49

== Bellator 80 ==
Bellator 80
- Date: November 9, 2012
- Venue: Seminole Hard Rock Hotel & Casino
- City: Hollywood, Florida

Bellator 80 took place on November 9, 2012 at the Seminole Hard Rock Hotel & Casino in Hollywood, Florida. The event was distributed live in prime time by MTV2.

Background

Bellator 80 hosted the second half of the semi-finals of Bellator's Season Seven Heavyweight Tournament and Featherweight Tournament.

The featherweight bout between Sky Moiseichik and Shanon Slack was changed to a 150 lb catchweight bout after both fighters failed to make weight.

Results

Main card
Weight class				Method	Round	Time	Notes
Bantamweight	Joe Warren	def.	Owen Evinger	Decision (unanimous) (30–27, 30–27, 30–27)	3	5:00
Featherweight	Rad Martinez	def.	Wagnney Fabiano	Decision (unanimous) (29–28, 29–28, 30–27)	3	5:00	(Note: Featherweight Tournament Semifinal)
Heavyweight	Alexander Volkov	def.	Vinicius Queiroz	TKO (punches)	2	4:59	(Note: Heavyweight Tournament Semifinal)
Middleweight	Brett Cooper	def.	Darryl Cobb	Decision (unanimous) (30–27, 30–27, 30–27)	3	5:00
Preliminary card
Lightweight	Brandon Girtz	def.	Mike Quinones	Decision (unanimous) (29–28, 29–28, 29–28)	3	5:00
Welterweight	Cristiano Souza	def.	Robert Otani	KO (punches)	1	2:46
Lightweight	Cosmo Alexandre	def.	Josh Quayhagen	Decision (unanimous) (30–27, 30–27, 30–27)	3	5:00
Catchweight (150 lb)	Shanon Slack	def.	Sky Moiseichik	Decision (unanimous) (30–27, 30–27, 30–27)	3	5:00
Middleweight	Joe Vedepo	def.	Mike Bernhard	Submission (shin choke)	1	3:26
Welterweight	Ryan DeRocher	def.	Taylor Krahl	KO (punches)	1	0:20

== Bellator 81 ==
Bellator 81
- Date: November 16, 2012
- Venue: Ryan Center
- City: Kingston, Rhode Island

Bellator 81 took place on November 16, 2012 at the Ryan Center in Kingston, Rhode Island. The event was distributed live in prime time by MTV2.

Background

Bellator 81 hosted the semi-finals of Bellator's Season Seven Lightweight Tournament.

Results

Main card
Weight class				Method	Round	Time	Notes
Lightweight	Marcin Held	def.	Rich Clementi	Submission (toe hold)	2	3:04	(Note: Lightweight Tournament Semifinal)
Lightweight	Dave Jansen	def.	Ricardo Tirloni	Decision (split) (29–28, 28–29, 29–28)	3	5:00	(Note: Lightweight Tournament Semifinal)
Featherweight	Marlon Sandro	def.	Dustin Neace	Technical submission (rear naked choke)	1	2:05
Middleweight	Perry Filkins	def.	Jonas Billstein	Decision (unanimous) (30–27, 29–28, 29–28)	3	5:00
Preliminary card
Bantamweight	Ruben Rey	def.	Robbie LeRoux	Decision (unanimous) (30–27, 29–28, 29–28)	3	5:00
Lightweight	Matt Bessette	def.	Paul Barrow	Decision (unanimous) (29–28, 30–27, 30–27)	3	5:00
Middleweight	Brennan Ward	def.	Sam McCoy	KO (punches)	1	2:49
Catchweight (210 lb)	Mike Mucitelli	def.	Matt Uhde	Submission (armbar)	1	0:26
Middleweight	Dan Cramer	def.	Joe Lamoureux	KO (punches)	1	3:26
Lightweight	Andrew Calandrelli	def.	Eric Brown	Submission (armbar)	2	3:10
Catchweight (165 lb)	Murad Machaev	def.	Lorawnt-T Nelson	Decision (unanimous) (30–27, 30–27, 30–27)	3	5:00

== Bellator 82 ==
Bellator 82
- Date: November 30, 2012
- Venue: Soaring Eagle Casino & Resort
- City: Mt. Pleasant, Michigan

Bellator 82 took place on November 30, 2012 at the Soaring Eagle Casino & Resort in Mt. Pleasant, Michigan. The event was distributed live in prime time by MTV2.

Background

Bellator 82 hosted the final of Bellator's Season Seven Welterweight Tournament.

British fighter Michael Page was expected to make his Bellator debut at this event, but withdrew due to undergoing jaw surgery.

Results

Main card
Weight class				Method	Round	Time	Notes
Welterweight	Andrey Koreshkov	def.	Lyman Good	Decision (unanimous) (29–28, 29–28, 29–28)	3	5:00	(Note: Welterweight Tournament Final)
Catchweight	David Rickels	def.	Jason Fischer	Decision (unanimous) (30–27, 29–28, 29–28)	3	5:00	(Note: 160 lb catchweight)
Middleweight	Doug Marshall	def.	Kala Hose	KO (punch)	1	0:22
Lightweight	Alexander Sarnavskiy	def.	Tony Hervey	Decision (unanimous) (30–27, 30–27, 30–27)	3	5:00
Preliminary card
Catchweight (162 lb)	John Schulz	def.	Hector Garcia	TKO (punches)	3	2:45
Welterweight	Mario Navarro	def.	Anthony Bain	Submission (triangle choke)	2	3:18
Bantamweight	Shawn Bunch	def.	Chad Coon	Decision (unanimous) (30–27, 30–27, 30–27)	3	5:00
Middleweight	Giva Santana	def.	Brendan Seguin	Submission (kneebar)	2	2:33
Light Heavyweight	Terry Davinney	def.	Matt Van Buren	KO (punch)	1	0:15
Featherweight	Jeremy Czarnecki	def.	Justin Houghton	Decision (unanimous) (29–28, 29–28, 29–28)	3	5:00

== Bellator 83 ==
Bellator 83
- Date: December 7, 2012
- Venue: Caesars Atlantic City
- City: Atlantic City, New Jersey

Bellator 83 took place on December 7, 2012 at the Caesars Atlantic City in Atlantic City, New Jersey The event was distributed live in prime time by MTV2.

Background

Bellator 83 was expected to host the final of Bellator's Season Seven Featherweight Tournament between finalists Shahbulat Shamhalaev and Rad Martinez. However, the night of the show it was announced on the air that the bout was cancelled due to Shamhalaev having food poisoning. The fight was initially moved to the following week's show, but then later postponed to season eight.

Results

Main event
Weight class				Method	Round	Time	Notes
Bantamweight	Anthony Leone	def.	Zach Makovsky	Decision (split) (29–28, 28–29, 29–28)	3	5:00
Women's Flyweight	Jessica Eye	def.	Zoila Gurgel	Technical submission (arm-triangle choke)	1	0:58
Lightweight	Darrell Horcher	def.	Chris Liguori	Decision (unanimous) (29–28, 29–28, 29–28)	3	5:00
Preliminary card
Heavyweight	Mike Wessel	def.	Alexei Kudin	Decision (unanimous) (29–28, 29–28, 29–28)	3	5:00
Bantamweight	Jimmie Rivera	def.	Jesse Brock	Decision (unanimous) (29–28, 30–27, 30–27)	3	5:00
Featherweight	Terrell Hobbs	def.	Brylan Van Artsdalen	Submission (rear-naked choke)	1	3:07
Catchweight (129 lb)	Tuan Pham	def.	Matthew Lozano	Decision (unanimous) (29–28, 29–28, 29–28)	3	5:00
Bantamweight	Claudio Ledesma	def.	David Harris	Decision (unanimous) (30–27, 30–27, 30–27)	3	5:00

== Bellator 84 ==
Bellator 84
- Date: December 14, 2012
- Venue: Horseshoe Casino
- City: Hammond, Indiana

Bellator 84 took place on December 14, 2012 at the Horseshoe Casino in Hammond, Indiana. The event was distributed live in prime time by MTV2.

Background

Bellator 84 hosted the final of Bellator's Season Seven Heavyweight and Lightweight Tournaments.

Christian M'Pumbu was expected to make his first defense of his light heavyweight title against 2012 Summer Series tournament winner Attila Vegh. However, on December 3, 2012, it was announced that Vegh had been pulled from the card due to injury and the match postponed for a later date.

Marcin Held and Dave Jansen were scheduled to compete in the Lightweight Tournament Final on this card. However, the match was cancelled because the Indiana Gaming Commission barred the 20-year-old Held from competing as one must be 21 to enter a casino.

The fight between Richard Hale and Alexander Volkov was the Heavyweight Tournament Final as well as for the vacated Heavyweight Title.

Results

Main card
Weight class				Method	Round	Time	Notes
Heavyweight	Alexander Volkov	def.	Richard Hale	Decision (unanimous)	5	5:00	(Note: Heavyweight Tournament Final; For Vacant Heavyweight Title)
Middleweight	Daniel Vizcaya	def.	Jack Hermansson	Decision (split)	3	5:00
Women's Strawweight	Felice Herrig	def.	Patricia Vidonic	Decision (unanimous)	3	5:00
Middleweight	Louis Taylor	def.	Joe Vedepo	KO (punch)	1	4:12
Preliminary card
Lightweight	Christian Uflacker	def.	Cliff Wright	Technical decision (unanimous)	3	2:26
Catchweight (215 lb)	Anthony Gomez	def.	Anton Talamantes	Submission (rear naked choke)	1	3:30
Flyweight	Jerald Williams	def.	Joey Diehl	Decision (unanimous)	3	5:00
Featherweight	Robert White	def.	Kenny Booker	Decision (unanimous)	3	5:00
Welterweight	Belal Muhammad	def.	Quinton McCottrell	Decision (unanimous)	3	5:00
Heavyweight	Dave Sharp	def.	Eddie Castillo	TKO (punches)	2	2:35

== Tournaments ==
=== Heavyweight tournament bracket ===
Quarterfinals
(Russia) Alexander Volkov	UD
(United States) Brett Rogers	3
(Brazil) Vinicius Queiroz	SUB
(United States) Mark Holata	1
(United States) Richard Hale	TKO
(United States) Mike Wessel	1
(Brazil) Thiago Santos	DQ
(United States) Eric Prindle	1

Semifinals
(Russia) Alexander Volkov	TKO
(Brazil) Vinicius Queiroz	2
(United States) Richard Hale	TKO
(Brazil) Thiago Santos	1

Finals
(Russia) Alexander Volkov	UD
(United States) Richard Hale	5

=== Welterweight tournament bracket ===
Quarterfinals
(Russia) Andrey Koreshkov	UD
(Philippines) Jordan Smith	3
(Lithuania) Marius Žaromskis	UD
(France) Nordine Taleb	3
(United States) Lyman Good	UD
(England) Jim Wallhead	3
(Russia) Michail Tsarev	SUB
(United States) Tim Welch	2

Semifinals
(Russia) Andrey Koreshkov	KO
(Lithuania) Marius Žaromskis	1
(United States) Lyman Good	TKO
(Russia) Michail Tsarev	2

Finals
(Russia) Andrey Koreshkov	UD
(United States) Lyman Good	3

=== Lightweight tournament bracket ===
Quarterfinals
(United States) Dave Jansen	SUB
(Russia) Magomed Saadulaev	3
(Brazil) Ricardo Tirloni	SUB
(Brazil) Rene Nazare	2
(Poland) Marcin Held	UD
(Russia) Murad Machaev	3
(United States) Rich Clementi	SD
(Russia) Alexander Sarnavskiy	3

Semifinals
(United States) Dave Jansen	SD
(Brazil) Ricardo Tirloni	3
(Poland) Marcin Held	2
(United States) Rich Clementi	SUB

Finals
(United States) Dave Jansen	UD
(Poland) Marcin Held	3

=== Featherweight tournament bracket ===
Quarterfinals
(Russia) Shahbulat Shamhalaev	TKO
(United States) Cody Bollinger	1
(United States) Mike Richman	TKO
(United States) Jeremy Spoon	1
(United States) Rad Martinez	UD
(Argentina) Nazareno Malegarie	3
(Brazil) Wagnney Fabiano	SUB
(Russia) Akop Stepanyan	1

Semifinals
(Russia) Shahbulat Shamhalaev	KO
(United States) Mike Richman	1
(United States) Rad Martinez	UD
(Brazil) Wagnney Fabiano	3

Finals
(Russia) Shahbulat Shamhalaev	KO
(United States) Rad Martinez	2
