= E.J. Brooks =

American mixed martial arts fighter

- Born: November 27, 1985 (age 40); United States
- Other names: The Pretty Boy
- Height: 5 ft 8 in (1.73 m)
- Weight: 170.5 lb (77.3 kg; 12.18 st)
- Division: Middleweight; Welterweight; Lightweight
- Reach: 72.0 in (183 cm)
- Fighting out of: Cahokia, Illinois, United States
- Team: St. Charles MMA / Rodrigo Vaghi Jiu-Jitsu
- Years active: 2010–present

Mixed martial arts record
- Total: 20
- Wins: 14
- By knockout: 1
- By submission: 3
- By decision: 10
- Losses: 6
- By knockout: 2
- By decision: 4

Other information
- Mixed martial arts record from Sherdog

Emanuel J. Brooks (born November 27, 1985) is an American mixed martial artist currently competing in the Middleweight division. A professional since 2010, he has fought in Bellator MMA.

== Background ==
Brooks competed in wrestling at Cahokia High School, and later at the University of Missouri.

== Mixed martial arts career ==
=== Bellator MMA ===
Brooks made his Bellator debut on October 8, 2011, at Bellator 53. He faced Greg Scott and won via second-round TKO.

He then quickly returned against Willian de Souza at Bellator 56 on October 29, 2011. He won the fight via unanimous decision.

Brooks faced Mikhail Malyutin at Bellator 65 on April 13, 2012. He won via unanimous decision.

Brooks faced Kalvin Hackney at Bellator 69 on May 18, 2012. He won the fight via unanimous decision.

Brooks was expected to face Joey Holt on June 22, 2012, at Bellator 71. However, the bout was cancelled for unknown reasons.

Brooks faced Darrell Horcher on October 19, 2012, at Bellator 77. Brooks lost the fight via KO in the first round.

=== Post-Bellator ===
Brooks was scheduled to face Billy Evangelista at MMA Xtreme on August 24, 2013. The bout was cancelled for unknown reasons. Brooks was expected to face Yosdenis Cedeno at CFA 12 on October 12, 2013. However, this bout was also cancelled for unknown reasons.

Over a year away from competition, Brooks returned and faced Johnny Case at RFA 10: Rhodes vs. Jouban on October 25, 2013. He lost the fight via split decision.

Brooks was expected to face Zach Juusola on March 7, 2014, at RFA 13. The bout was cancelled for unknown reasons.

Brooks faced Alex Ricci on May 30, 2014, at Substance Cage Combat 2.0. He lost the fight via unanimous decision.

Brooks was expected to face Efraín Escudero at Titan FC 29 on August 22, 2014. The bout was cancelled when Escudero re-signed with the UFC.

Brooks faced Todd Moore on September 26, 2014, at Titan FC 30. He won the fight via unanimous decision.

In June 2015, Brooks lost to Brazilian fighter Ricardo Tirloni in the main event of Arena Tour 6.

Brooks faced Jason Novelli at Titan FC 35: Healy vs. Hawn on September 19, 2015. He lost the fight via unanimous decision.

Brooks faced Ben Egli at Titan FC 37: Simon vs. Dos Santos on March 4, 2016. He won the fight via unanimous decision.

Brooks faced Dakota Cochrane at VFC 56 on April 14, 2017. He won the fight via unanimous decision.

=== Return to Bellator and other promotions ===
Brooks returned to Bellator and faced Guilherme Vasconcelos at Bellator 181 on July 14, 2017. He won the fight via unanimous decision.

Brooks won by decision against Husein Kushagov at Absolute Championship Akhmat on April 21, 2018, in Rimini, Italy.

Brooks won against Steve Kennedy at Absolute Championship Akhmat on June 16, 2018, in Brisbane, Australia.

Brooks lost due to an arm injury against Logan Storley at Bellator 233 on Nov. 9, 2019. The fight was stopped after the first round.

Brooks defeated Derek Holly at Fighting Alliance Championship 5, in Kansas City by submission due to Brabo choke at 4:58 in the 3rd round.

== Mixed martial arts record ==
Professional record breakdown
20 matches	14 wins	6 losses
By knockout	1	2
By submission	3	0
By decision	10	4
Draws	0	

Res.	Record	Opponent	Method	Event	Date	Round	Time	Location	Notes
Win	14–6	Derek Holly	Submission (brabo choke)	FAC 5	December 11, 2020	3	4:58	Independence, Missouri, United States	
Loss	13–6	Logan Storley	TKO (doctor stoppage)	Bellator 233	November 8, 2019	1	5:00	Thackerville, Oklahoma, United States	Catchweight (175 lb) bout.
Win	13–5	Steve Kennedy	Decision (unanimous)	ACB 88: Barnatt vs. Celiński	June 16, 2018	3	5:00	Brisbane, Australia	Middleweight debut.
Win	12–5	Husein Kushagov	Decision (split)	ACB 85: Leone vs Ginazov	April 21, 2018	3	5:00	Rimini, Italy	
Win	11–5	Guilherme Vasconcelos	Decision (unanimous)	Bellator 181	July 14, 2017	3	5:00	Thackerville, Oklahoma, United States	
Win	10–5	Dakota Cochrane	Decision (unanimous)	VFC 56	April 14, 2017	3	5:00	Omaha, Nebraska, United States	
Win	9–5	Ben Egli	Decision (unanimous)	Titan FC 37: Simon vs. Dos Santos	March 4, 2016	3	5:00	Ridgefield, Washington, United States	Welterweight debut.
Loss	8–5	Jason Novelli	Decision (unanimous)	Titan FC 35: Healy vs. Hawn	September 19, 2015	3	5:00	Ridgefield, Washington, United States	
Loss	8–4	Ricardo Tirloni	Decision (unanimous)	Arena Tour 6: Tirloni vs. Brooks	June 26, 2015	3	5:00	Cordoba, Argentina	
Win	8–3	Todd Moore	Decision (unanimous)	Titan FC 30: Brilz vs. Magalhaes	September 26, 2014	3	5:00	Cedar Park, Texas, United States	Catchweight (165 lb) bout.
Loss	7–3	Alex Ricci	Decision (unanimous)	Substance Cage Combat 2.0	May 30, 2014	3	5:00	Toronto, Ontario, Canada	
Loss	7–2	Johnny Case	Decision (split)	RFA 10: Rhodes vs. Jouban	October 25, 2013	3	5:00	Des Moines, Iowa, United States	
Loss	7–1	Darrell Horcher	KO (punch)	Bellator 77	October 19, 2012	1	0:21	Reading, Pennsylvania, United States	Bellator Season Seven Lightweight Tournament Reserve Bout.
Win	7–0	Kalvin Hackney	Decision (unanimous)	Bellator 69	May 18, 2012	3	5:00	Lake Charles, Louisiana, United States	
Win	6–0	Mikhail Malyutin	Decision (unanimous)	Bellator 65	April 13, 2012	3	5:00	Atlantic City, New Jersey, United States	
Win	5–0	Willian de Souza	Decision (unanimous)	Bellator 56	October 29, 2011	3	5:00	Kansas City, Kansas, United States	Catchweight (158 lb) bout.
Win	4–0	Greg Scott	TKO (punches)	Bellator 53	October 8, 2011	2	2:40	Miami, Oklahoma, United States	Catchweight (160 lb) bout.
Win	3–0	Matt Rider	Submission (arm-triangle choke)	Fight Me MMA: Trujillo vs. Gwaltney	August 13, 2011	2	2:58	St. Charles, Missouri, United States	
Win	2–0	Evian Rodriguez	Submission (arm-triangle choke)	WC: Wright Fights 2	March 11, 2011	1	3:36	St. Charles, Missouri, United States	
Win	1–0	Eric Kriegermeier	Decision (split)	SportFight X 3: Undefeated	July 10, 2010	3	5:00	Atlanta, Georgia, United States	
