= Luis Nogueira =

Brazilian mixed martial artist

- Born: Luis Alberto Ribeiro Nogueira; April 10, 1985 (age 41)
- Other names: Betão, Terrier
- Nationality: Brazilian
- Height: 5 ft 6 in (1.68 m)
- Weight: 135 lb (61 kg; 9.6 st)
- Division: Bantamweight
- Style: Wrestling
- Fighting out of: Rio de Janeiro, Brazil
- Team: Renovacao Fight Team
- Years active: 2008-present

Mixed martial arts record
- Total: 34
- Wins: 23
- By knockout: 6
- By submission: 6
- By decision: 11
- Losses: 9
- By knockout: 3
- By submission: 1
- By decision: 5
- Draws: 2

Other information
- Mixed martial arts record from Sherdog

Luis Alberto Nogueira (born April 10, 1985) is a Brazilian professional mixed martial artist who competes in the bantamweight division. A professional MMA competitor since 2008, Nogueira has mostly fought for Shooto Brazil before making his U.S. debut with Bellator Fighting Championships.

== Mixed martial arts career ==
=== Background ===
Nogueira won his first four fights before losing his first fight by way of second round submission to future Bellator Bantamweight Champion Eduardo Dantas. Since then he has won 10 out of his last 12 fights including wins over Alexis Vila, Hiroshi Nakamura and Rodolfo Marques.

=== Bellator Fighting Championships ===
In April 2011, Nogueira signed with the #2 MMA promotion Bellator. He made his debut against Jerod Spoon winning a unanimous decision.

With the win he entered the Season 5 Bantamweight tournament but lost a unanimous decision to Ed West in the quarter-finals.

His next fight would be against Zak Laird, who he submitted in under a minute in the first round. It was then announced that Nogueira would compete in the Season 6 Bantamweight tournament.

Unlike his previous quarter final, Nogueira notched up the biggest victory of his career thus far, winning a unanimous decision over Olympic Bronze Medalist Alexis Vila. Nogueira next competed against Hiroshi Nakamura in the tournament semi-finals. He won the fight via KO in the third round.

He faced Marcos Galvao in the finals of the tournament and lost via second round TKO.

In his next bout for the organization, he faced Frank Baca at Bellator 105 on October 25, 2013. He won via arm triangle choke in the second round.

=== Pancrase ===
In March 2015, Nogueira signed a multi-fight deal with Pancrase.

== Personal life ==
Nogueira had a very short childhood, being married at the age of 14 and having his first child when he was 15 years old.

== Championships and accomplishments ==
- Bellator Fighting Championships
  - Bellator Season 6 Bantamweight Tournament Runner-Up

== Mixed martial arts record ==
Professional record breakdown
| 35 matches | 23 wins | 10 losses |
| By knockout | 6 | 4 |
| By submission | 6 | 1 |
| By decision | 11 | 5 |
| Draws | 2 | |

| Res. | Record | Opponent | Method | Event | Date | Round | Time | Location | Notes |
|---|---|---|---|---|---|---|---|---|---|
| Loss | 23–10–2 | Marcos Rodrigues | KO (knees) | SFT 32: Nogueira vs. Marajó | December 18, 2021 | 1 | 4:14 | São Paulo, Brazil | For the vacant SFT Featherweight Championship. |
| Win | 23–9–2 | Heliton dos Santos | Submission (anaconda choke) | SFT 29: Nogueira vs Santos | September 2, 2021 | 2 | 3:30 | São Paulo, Brazil | Won the Interim SFT Interim Featherweight Championship. |
| Loss | 22–9–2 | Rudney Carvalho | TKO (retirement) | Rei da Luta 3 | March 13, 2021 | 1 | 4:47 | Rio de Janeiro, Brazil | Catchweight (141 lb) bout. |
| Win | 22–8–2 | Rafael Barbosa | Decision (split) | Future FC 9 | October 19, 2019 | 3 | 5:00 | São Paulo, Brazil | |
| Draw | 21–8–2 | Fabricio Oliveira | Draw (majority) | Qualify Combat 7 | October 27, 2018 | 3 | 5:00 | Salvador, Brazil | For vacant QC Featherweight Championship. |
| Loss | 21–8–1 | Islam Siszbulatow | KO (punch) | ACB 84: Agujev vs. Burrell | April 7, 2018 | 1 | 1:39 | Bratislava, Slovakia | |
| Loss | 21–7–1 | Said Nurmagomedov | Decision (unanimous) | World Fighting Championship Akhmat 42 | September 27, 2017 | 3 | 5:00 | Moscow, Russia | |
| Loss | 21–6–1 | Yunus Evloev | Decision (unanimous) | World Fighting Championship Akhmat 38 | May 21, 2017 | 3 | 5:00 | Grozny, Russia | |
| Loss | 21–5–1 | Mamoru Yamaguchi | Decision (split) | Pancrase: 281 | October 2, 2016 | 3 | 5:00 | Tokyo, Japan | |
| Win | 21–4–1 | Johnny Frachey | Submission (arm-triangle choke) | World Fighting Championship Akhmat 16 | March 12, 2016 | 2 | 3:57 | Grozny, Russia | |
| Win | 20–4–1 | Yuki Baba | KO (slam) | Pancrase: 271 | November 11, 2015 | 1 | 1:12 | Tokyo, Japan | |
| Loss | 19–4–1 | Masakatsu Ueda | Decision (unanimous) | Pancrase: 268 | July 5, 2015 | 3 | 5:00 | Tokyo, Japan | |
| Win | 19–3–1 | Hemerson Hubaldo | Decision (unanimous) | Face to Face 11 | April 24, 2015 | 3 | 5:00 | Rio de Janeiro, Brazil | |
| Win | 18–3–1 | Paulo Robinson | Decision (unanimous) | Face to Face 8 | September 12, 2014 | 3 | 5:00 | Rio de Janeiro, Brazil | |
| Win | 17–3–1 | Francisco Cylderlan Lima da Silva | Decision (unanimous) | Face to Face 6 | January 31, 2014 | 3 | 5:00 | Rio de Janeiro, Brazil | |
| Win | 16–3–1 | Frank Baca | Submission (arm triangle choke) | Bellator 105 | October 25, 2013 | 1 | 4:41 | Rio Rancho, New Mexico, United States | |
| Draw | 15–3–1 | Francisco de Lima Maciel | Draw | Watch Out Combat Show 27 | August 2, 2013 | 3 | 5:00 | Rio de Janeiro, Brazil | |
| Win | 15–3 | Francisco Figueiredo | Submission (arm triangle choke) | BOTB: Para vs. Brazil | November 29, 2012 | 2 | N/A | Belém, Brazil | |
| Loss | 14–3 | Marcos Galvao | TKO (elbows) | Bellator 73 | August 24, 2012 | 2 | 4:20 | Tunica, Mississippi, United States | Bellator Season 6 Bantamweight Tournament Final |
| Win | 14–2 | Hiroshi Nakamura | KO (punches) | Bellator 70 | May 25, 2012 | 3 | 1:58 | New Orleans, Louisiana, United States | Bellator Season 6 Bantamweight Tournament Semifinal |
| Win | 13–2 | Alexis Vila | Decision (unanimous) | Bellator 65 | April 13, 2012 | 3 | 5:00 | Atlantic City, New Jersey, United States | Bellator Season 6 Bantamweight Tournament Quarterfinal |
| Win | 12–2 | Zak Laird | Submission (guillotine choke) | Bellator 53 | October 8, 2011 | 1 | 0:51 | Miami, Oklahoma, United States | |
| Loss | 11–2 | Ed West | Decision (unanimous) | Bellator 51 | September 24, 2011 | 3 | 5:00 | Canton, Ohio, United States | Bellator Season 5 Bantamweight Tournament Quarterfinal |
| Win | 11–1 | Jerod Spoon | Decision (unanimous) | Bellator 42 | April 23, 2011 | 3 | 5:00 | Concho, Oklahoma, United States | |
| Win | 10–1 | Atila Lourenco | Submission (arm-triangle choke) | Shooto: Brazil 19 | October 17, 2010 | 2 | 0:50 | Flamengo, Brazil | |
| Win | 9–1 | Mauricio Santos Jr. | Decision (unanimous) | Juiz de Fora Fight: Evolution | October 2, 2010 | 3 | 5:00 | Juiz de Fora, Brazil | |
| Win | 8–1 | Erivaldo Santos | TKO (punches) | Universal Fight Combat | December 17, 2009 | 1 | 4:19 | Anchieta, Rio de Janeiro, Brazil | |
| Win | 7–1 | Albino Mendes | Decision (split) | X-Combat Ultra MMA | September 20, 2009 | 3 | 5:00 | Vitoria, Brazil | |
| Win | 6–1 | Zeilton Rodrigues | Decision (unanimous) | Shooto: Brazil 13 | August 27, 2009 | 3 | 5:00 | Fortaleza, Brazil | |
| Win | 5–1 | Rodolfo Marques | Decision (unanimous) | Shooto: Brazil 11 | March 28, 2009 | 3 | 5:00 | Barra da Tijuca, Brazil | |
| Loss | 4–1 | Eduardo Dantas | Submission (armbar) | Shooto: Brazil 9 | November 29, 2008 | 2 | 1:41 | Fortaleza, Brazil | For the vacant Shooto South America Featherweight (123 - 132 lbs.) Championship |
| Win | 4–0 | Zanon Pitbull | Decision (split) | Shooto: Brazil 8 | August 30, 2008 | 3 | 5:00 | Barra da Tijuca, Brazil | |
| Win | 3–0 | Hudson Rocha | TKO (punches) | Shooto: Brazil 7 | June 28, 2008 | 1 | 4:13 | Rio de Janeiro, Brazil | |
| Win | 2–0 | Luis Henrique Drago | KO (punch) | Watch Out Combat Show 1 | May 10, 2008 | 1 | N/A | Barra da Tijuca, Brazil | |
| Win | 1–0 | Evanderson Lopes | TKO | Comunidade Fight 1 | January 5, 2008 | N/A | N/A | Rio de Janeiro, Brazil | |

== See also ==
- List of Bellator MMA alumni
- List of male mixed martial artists
