= Vinicius Queiroz =

Brazilian mixed martial arts fighter

- Born: Vinicius Kappke de Queiroz; August 29, 1983 (age 43); Curitiba, Brazil
- Other names: Spartan
- Height: 6 ft 7 in (2.01 m)
- Weight: 233.6 lb (106 kg; 16 st 10 lb)
- Division: Heavyweight
- Reach: 79.5 in (202 cm)
- Stance: Orthodox
- Fighting out of: Curitiba, Brazil
- Team: Team Nogueira; Chute Boxe
- Rank: Black belt in Muay Thai; Brown belt in Brazilian jiu-jitsu
- Years active: 2003–present

Mixed martial arts record
- Total: 12
- Wins: 8
- By knockout: 6
- By submission: 2
- Losses: 4
- By knockout: 1
- By submission: 1
- By decision: 2

Other information
- Mixed martial arts record from Sherdog
- Last updated on: September 5, 2013

Vinicius Kappke de Queiroz (born August 29, 1983) is a Brazilian mixed martial artist who most recently competed in the Heavyweight division of Bellator. A professional competitor since 2003, he has also competed for the UFC.

== Background ==
Originally from Curitiba, Brazil, Queiroz began training when he was 13 years old. He is a national champion in wrestling, a black belt in Muay Thai and holds a 5-0 undefeated record in Muay Thai with all five wins coming by way of knockout. Quieroz is also a brown belt in Brazilian jiu-jitsu and has won titles in that sport as well.

== Mixed martial arts career ==
=== Early career ===
Queiroz made his professional mixed martial arts debut in his native Brazil in November 2003. Over the next seven years, he amassed a record of 5 wins and 1 loss before signing with the UFC.

=== Ultimate Fighting Championship ===
Queiroz made his debut against Rob Broughton at UFC 120, losing via rear naked choke. Queiroz later tested positive for the steroid Stanozolol and was released by the UFC.

=== Bellator MMA ===
After sitting out from the sport for well over a year, Queiroz signed with Bellator in March 2012.

He made his debut as a participant in the Bellator Season Seven Heavyweight Tournament against Mark Holata at Bellator 75. Despite being knocked down by a punch early on, Queiroz kept his composure and won the fight via armbar just a few minutes later. He faced Alexander Volkov on November 9, 2012 at Bellator 80 in the semifinal. He lost via TKO in the second round in an extremely controversial fight.

Queiroz was scheduled to enter the Bellator Summer Series Heavyweight Tournament but pulled out due to an injury. He was replaced by Ryan Martinez.

In the fall of 2013, Queiroz entered the four-man Season Nine Heavyweight tournament. He faced Lavar Johnson in the semifinals at Bellator 102 and won by a shocking knockout at just 23 seconds into the fight. He was scheduled to face Cheick Kongo in the finals but would withdraw due to a knee injury and was replaced by Peter Graham.

After nearly two years away from the sport, Queiroz returned to the Bellator cage to face Ewerton Teixeira at Bellator 143 on September 25, 2015. He won the fight via submission in the second round.

== Mixed martial arts record ==
Professional record breakdown
| 12 matches | 8 wins | 4 losses |
| By knockout | 6 | 1 |
| By submission | 2 | 1 |
| By decision | 0 | 2 |

| Res. | Record | Opponent | Method | Event | Date | Round | Time | Location | Notes |
|---|---|---|---|---|---|---|---|---|---|
| Loss | 8–4 | Cheick Kongo | Decision (split) | Bellator 150 | February 26, 2016 | 3 | 5:00 | Mulvane, Kansas, United States | |
| Win | 8–3 | Ewerton Teixeira | Submission (arm-triangle choke) | Bellator 143 | September 25, 2015 | 2 | 4:00 | Hidalgo, Texas, United States | |
| Win | 7–3 | Lavar Johnson | KO (punch) | Bellator 102 | October 4, 2013 | 1 | 0:23 | Visalia, California, United States | Bellator Season Nine Heavyweight Tournament Semifinal. |
| Loss | 6–3 | Alexander Volkov | TKO (punches) | Bellator 80 | November 9, 2012 | 2 | 4:59 | Hollywood, Florida, United States | Bellator Season Seven Heavyweight Tournament Semifinal. |
| Win | 6–2 | Mark Holata | Submission (armbar) | Bellator 75 | October 5, 2012 | 1 | 3:26 | Hammond, Indiana, United States | Bellator Season Seven Heavyweight Tournament Quarterfinal. |
| Loss | 5–2 | Rob Broughton | Submission (rear-naked choke) | UFC 120 | October 16, 2010 | 3 | 1:43 | London, England, United Kingdom | |
| Win | 5–1 | Danilo Rodaki | TKO (knee and punches) | Samurai Fight Combat 3 | April 25, 2010 | 1 | 2:46 | Curitiba, Paraná, Brazil | |
| Win | 4–1 | Rogerio Farias | KO (punches) | Match Point Sports Aquafit Fight Championship 2 | October 9, 2009 | 1 | 0:46 | Porto Alegre, Brazil | |
| Win | 3–1 | Nelson Martins | KO (punch) | Samurai Fight Combat 1 | September 12, 2009 | 1 | 1:58 | Curitiba, Paraná, Brazil | |
| Win | 2–1 | Cleiton Moura | KO (punches) | Torneio Estimulo - Third Round | June 27, 2008 | 1 | 0:35 | Curitiba, Paraná, Brazil | |
| Loss | 1–1 | Danilo Pereira | Decision (unanimous) | Real Fight 4 | August 18, 2007 | 2 | 5:00 | São Paulo, Brazil | |
| Win | 1-0 | Lamar Silva | KO (head kick) | Storm Samurai 1 | November 29, 2003 | 2 | 3:16 | Curitiba, Paraná, Brazil | |
