= Jordan Smith (fighter) =

American mixed martial arts fighter (born 1984)

- Born: December 25, 1984 (age 41); Angeles City, Philippines
- Other names: Mata Ele
- Nationality: American
- Height: 6 ft 0 in (1.83 m)
- Weight: 185.2 lb (84.0 kg; 13.23 st)
- Division: Light Heavyweight; Middleweight; Welterweight
- Fighting out of: Layton, Utah, United States
- Team: Black House; One Hit MMA

Mixed martial arts record
- Total: 26
- Wins: 18
- By knockout: 7
- By submission: 8
- By decision: 3
- Losses: 7
- By knockout: 2
- By decision: 5
- Draws: 1

Other information
- Mixed martial arts record from Sherdog

Jordan Smith (born December 25, 1984) in Angeles City, Philippines is an American mixed martial arts fighter who last competed in 2014.

== Background ==
Smith's nickname "Mata Ele" is Portuguese for "Kill him." While attending McKendree University, Smith attended an amateur MMA event with his brother, Jake. A former football player, Smith soon began training in MMA himself.

== Mixed martial arts career ==
=== Early career ===
Smith made his amateur debut on June 15, 2007, at 205 lbs with a 19 second TKO victory over Alex May. He amassed a record of 5 amateur fights, all ending with first round finishes.

Smith made his professional debut on December 8, 2007, in the light heavyweight division. He won his first 10 professional fights, finishing all 10 opponents, 8 in the first round. Following a draw with the much larger Rich Hale, Smith dropped to the 185 lb weight class for his next fight, a first round submission of IFL veteran Bristol Marunde.

Jordan then appeared on the first episode of The Ultimate Fighter: Team Liddell vs. Team Ortiz, where he lost via KO to Brad Tavares. He followed his TUF loss with 3 victories at 185 lbs. He lost via split decision to UFC veteran Josh Burkman at a catchweight of 180 lbs.

Following the Burkman fight Jordan once again dropped weight classes settling at Welterweight (170). His Welterweight debut resulted in a third round submission of Mario Sartori. Jordan's next fight ended in only 11 seconds, with him getting TKO'd by Tim McKenzie. Jordan has since earned decision victories over well known UFC veteran Karo Parisyan and WEC and Strikeforce veteran Josh McDonald.

=== Bellator Fighting Championships ===
In 2012, Smith was featured in the Bellator Season Six Welterweight Tournament. He replaced Brian Foster in the opening round of the welterweight tournament and faced David Rickels in the opening round of the tournament at Bellator 63 and lost via first round KO.

Jordan faced Andrey Koreshkov on September 28, 2012, at Bellator LXXIV. He lost the fight via unanimous decision.

== Bare-knuckle boxing ==
Smith made his Bare Knuckle Fighting Championship debut against Josenaldo Silva on May 10, 2025 at BKFC 74. He lost the fight by technical knockout in the third round.

== Personal life ==
Smith is a middle school science teacher at West Point Junior High School in Utah.

== Mixed martial arts record ==
Professional record breakdown
26 matches	18 wins	7 losses
By knockout	7	2
By submission	8	0
By decision	3	5
Draws	1	
No contests	0	

Res.	Record	Opponent	Method	Event	Date	Round	Time	Location	Notes
Loss	18–7–1	Anatoly Tokov	Decision (unanimous)	Plotforma S-70 5	August 9, 2014	3	5:00	Sochi, Russia	
Loss	18–6–1	Edgar García	Decision (split)	Showdown Fights 13: Lopez vs. Castillo	January 24, 2014	3	5:00	Orem, Utah, United States	
Win	18–5–1	Colton Vaughan	TKO (punches)	RITC: Rage in the Cage 7	August 23, 2013	1	3:34	Nampa, Idaho, United States	Return to Middleweight.
Loss	17–5–1	Jesse Juarez	Decision (split)	Bellator 90	February 21, 2013	3	5:00	West Valley City, Utah, United States	
Loss	17–4–1	Andrey Koreshkov	Decision (unanimous)	Bellator 74	September 28, 2012	3	5:00	Atlantic City, New Jersey, United States	Bellator Season Seven Welterweight Tournament Quarterfinal.
Loss	17–3–1	David Rickels	KO (punches)	Bellator 63	March 30, 2012	1	0:22	Uncasville, Connecticut, United States	Bellator Season Six Welterweight Tournament Quarterfinal.
Win	17–2–1	Josh McDonald	Decision (unanimous)	Showdown Fights: Evolution	November 18, 2011	3	5:00	Orem, Utah, United States	
Win	16–2–1	Karo Parisyan	Decision (split)	Amazon Forest Combat 1	September 14, 2011	3	5:00	Manaus, Brazil	
Loss	15–2–1	Tim McKenzie	TKO (punches)	Showdown Fights: Shootout	April 16, 2011	1	0:11	Orem, Utah, United States	
Win	15–1–1	Mario Sartori	Submission (rear-naked choke)	Bitetti Combat 8: 100 Years of Corinthians	December 4, 2010	3	4:52	São Paulo, Brazil	
Loss	14–1–1	Joshua Burkman	Decision (split)	Showdown Fights: Respect	September 24, 2010	3	5:00	Orem, Utah, United States	
Win	14–0–1	Brandon Melendez	Submission (guillotine choke)	World Championship Full Contact	June 5, 2010	1	3:23	Salt Lake City, Utah, United States	Welterweight debut.
Win	13–0–1	Gustavo Machado	Decision (unanimous)	Washington Combat: Battle of the Legends	May 15, 2010	3	5:00	Washington, D.C., United States	
Win	12–0–1	Nick Rossborough	KO (punches)	World Championship Full Contact	April 3, 2010	1	2:32	Salt Lake City, Utah, United States	Light Heavyweight bout.
Win	11–0–1	Bristol Marunde	Submission (triangle choke)	Throwdown Showdown 5: Homecoming	November 20, 2009	1	2:52	Orem, Utah, United States	Middleweight debut.
Draw	10–0–1	Rich Hale	Draw	Throwdown Showdown 4: Cuatro	June 6, 2009	5	5:00	West Valley City, Utah, United States	
Win	10–0	Sean O'Connell	Submission (rear-naked choke)	Throwdown Showdown 3: Big Time	February 20, 2009	1	2:30	Salt Lake City, Utah, United States	
Win	9–0	Jeremy Peterson	TKO	Jeremy Horn's Elite Fight Night 5	November 14, 2008	2	N/A	Layton, Utah, United States	
Win	8–0	Ben Fuimaono	Submission (rear-naked choke)	Throwdown Showdown 2: The Return	September 26, 2008	1	1:34	Orem, Utah, United States	
Win	7–0	Rich Guerin	Technical Submission (rear-naked choke)	LMMA: Lightning at Legends	June 28, 2008	1	N/A	Toppenish, Washington, United States]	
Win	6–0	Booker DeRousse	Submission (rear-naked choke)	Take That Promotions: Battle at The Bend 1	June 7, 2008	1	2:59	Bethalto, Illinois, United States	
Win	5–0	Tua Lino	TKO (punches)	Jeremy Horn's Elite Fight Night 2	May 17, 2008	1	2:30	Salt Lake City, Utah, United States	
Win	4–0	Dave Bosen	TKO	UCE: Round 30, Episode 7	February 16, 2008	2	1:42	Salt Lake City, Utah, United States	
Win	3–0	Bill Woodson	Submission (guillotine choke)	UCE: Round 30, Episode 4	January 26, 2008	1	1:59	Salt Lake City, Utah, United States	
Win	2–0	Aaron Sawyer	TKO (injury)	UCE: Round 29, Episode 1	December 8, 2007	1	5:00	Salt Lake City, Utah, United States	
Win	1–0	Alex May	TKO (punches)	MMA: Genesis 3	June 15, 2007	1	0:19	St. Charles, Missouri, United States	

== Mixed martial arts exhibition record ==
Exhibition record breakdown		
1 match	0 wins	1 loss
By knockout	0	1

Res.	Record	Opponent	Method	Event	Date	Round	Time	Location	Notes
Loss	0–1	Brad Tavares	KO (knee)	The Ultimate Fighter: Team Liddell vs. Team Ortiz	Jan 23, 2010	1	0:45	Las Vegas, Nevada, United States	The Ultimate Fighter 11 Elimination round.

== Bare knuckle boxing record ==
Professional record breakdown
1 match	0 wins	1 loss
By knockout	0	1

Res.	Record	Opponent	Method	Event	Date	Round	Time	Location	Notes
Loss	0–1	Josenaldo Silva	KO	BKFC 74	May 10, 2025	3	1:48	West Valley City, Utah, United States	
