= Duane Bastress =

American mixed martial artist

- Born: May 30, 1983 (age 43); New Cumberland, Pennsylvania, United States
- Other names: The Storm
- Height: 5 ft 10 in (1.78 m)
- Weight: 185 lb (84 kg; 13.2 st)
- Division: Middleweight (185 lb)
- Reach: 67 in (170 cm)
- Fighting out of: New Cumberland, Pennsylvania, United States
- Team: Central Pennsylvania Martial Arts Academy
- Wrestling: NCAA Division III Wrestling
- Years active: 2009–present

Mixed martial arts record
- Total: 9
- Wins: 7
- By knockout: 5
- By submission: 1
- By decision: 1
- Losses: 2
- By knockout: 1
- By submission: 1

Other information
- Occupation: Mixed martial artist Wrestling coach
- University: York College of Pennsylvania
- Notable school: Bermudian Springs High School
- Mixed martial arts record from Sherdog

Duane Bastress (born May 30, 1983) is an American mixed martial artist who last competed in Bellator's Middleweight division.

== Background ==
Born and raised in Pennsylvania, Bastress wrestled for Bloomsburg University of Pennsylvania as a freshman, before transferring to York College of Pennsylvania for his sophomore season. A two-time national champion under coach Tom Kessler, Bastress compiled an overall record of 97-6 at York. He also had an undefeated 40-0 senior season, and held a 65 match winning streak when he graduated. Bastress was later Kessler's assistant for several seasons before ascending to the head coach position.

== Mixed martial arts career ==
=== Early career ===
Bastress started his professional career in 2010. He fought primarily for Pennsylvania-based promotion Central Pennsylvania Warrior Challenge, winning three times in a row.

In December 2010 Bastress faced Tim Williams for the middleweight title of Philadelphia's organization Locked in the Cage in a five round bout. He lost the fight at the end of the third round via doctor stoppage.

With a record of three victories and one loss, he signed with Bellator.

=== Bellator Fighting Championships ===
Bastress made his debut on October 15, 2011 at Bellator 54 against Daniel Gracie. Bastress won when the doctor deemed Gracie unable to continue due to a cut over his eye at the end of the second round.

Bastress faced Plinio Cruz on April 13, 2012 at Bellator 65. He won via TKO in the second round.

Bastress faced promotional newcomer Jason Butcher on June 22, 2012 at Bellator 71. He had his first defeat in the promotion via submission in the very first round.

Bastress was expected to face Lewis Rumsey on October 19, 2012 at Bellator 77. However, Rumsey was replaced by Ariel Sepulveda due to undisclosed reasons. Bastress defeated Sepulveda via split decision (29-28, 28-29, 29-28).

In May 2013—despite coming off from a win—it was announced that Bellator didn't renew Bastress' contract.

== Personal life ==
Bastress is married and has two daughters; Cora and Audrey and one son, Drake. Bastress' wife, April, was a standout field hockey player for York.

== Championships and accomplishments ==
=== Amateur wrestling ===
- National Collegiate Athletic Association
  - NCAA Division III All-American out of York College of Pennsylvania (2005–06)
  - NCAA Division III 184 lb: Champion out of York College of Pennsylvania (2005–06)
- National Wrestling Coaches Association
  - NWCA Division III National Hall of Fame (2013)

== Mixed martial arts record ==
Professional record breakdown
9 matches	7 wins	2 losses
By knockout	5	1
By submission	1	1
By decision	1	0

Res.	Record	Opponent	Method	Event	Date	Round	Time	Location	Notes
Win	7–2	Mike Stewart	TKO (punches)	CFFC 26: Sullivan vs. Martinez	August 17, 2013	3	0:33	Atlantic City, New Jersey, United States	
Win	6–2	Ariel Sepulveda	Decision (split)	Bellator 77	October 19, 2012	3	5:00	Reading, Pennsylvania, United States	
Loss	5–2	Jason Butcher	Submission (triangle choke)	Bellator 71	June 22, 2012	1	1:03	Chester, West Virginia, United States	
Win	5–1	Plinio Cruz	TKO (punches)	Bellator 65	April 13, 2012	2	2:52	Atlantic City, New Jersey, United States	
Win	4–1	Daniel Gracie	TKO (doctor stoppage)	Bellator 54	October 15, 2011	2	5:00	Atlantic City, New Jersey, United States	
Loss	3–1	Tim Williams	TKO (doctor stoppage)	Locked in the Cage 6	December 3, 2010	3	5:00	Philadelphia, Pennsylvania, United States	For the LITC middleweight Championship.
Win	3–0	Roger Minton III	TKO (punches)	Central Pennsylvania Warrior Challenge 6	June 4, 2010	1	0:51	Lancaster, Pennsylvania, United States	
Win	2–0	Robert Morrow	TKO (punches)	Central Pennsylvania Warrior Challenge 5	April 15, 2010	1	2:47	York, Pennsylvania, United States	
Win	1–0	Elder Ramos	TKO (submission to punches)	Central Pennsylvania Warrior Challenge 4	February 19, 2010	2	2:21	Lancaster, Pennsylvania, United States	

=== Mixed martial arts amateur record ===
Res.	Record	Opponent	Method	Event	Date	Round	Time	Location	Notes
Win	2–0	John Flock	Decision (unanimous)	Central Pennsylvania Warrior Challenge 3	October 23, 2009	3	3:00	Lancaster, Pennsylvania, United States	
Win	1–0	Robert Martin	Submission (keylock)	WKU: Warrior Challenge in the Poconos	June 26, 2009	1	1:18	Pocono Manor, Pennsylvania, United States	
