= Plinio Cruz =

Brazilian-American mixed martial artist and coach (b. 1985)

- Born: Plinio M. Franchi Cruz; November 30, 1985 (age 40); São Paulo, Brazil
- Nationality: Brazilian; American
- Height: 6 ft 1 in (185 cm)
- Weight: 269.3 lb (122 kg; 19 st 3 lb)
- Division: Middleweight (2008–2012); Heavyweight (2014–2017); Super Heavyweight (2019); Heavyweight (Boxing)
- Reach: 74 in (188 cm)
- Style: Brazilian jiu-jitsu
- Fighting out of: Newark, New Jersey, U.S.
- Team: Macaco Gold Team (2008–2012); Cruz MMA Academy (2013–2019; 2026–present)
- Trainer: Jorge Patino
- Rank: 3rd degree black belt in Brazilian jiu-jitsu under Jorge Patino; 2nd dan black belt in Judo under Jorge "Macaco" Patino; Black prajiad in Muay Thai
- Years active: 2008–2019, 2026–present

Professional boxing record
- Total: 1
- Wins: 1
- By knockout: 1

Mixed martial arts record
- Total: 17
- Wins: 8
- By knockout: 1
- By submission: 2
- By decision: 5
- Losses: 9
- By knockout: 5
- By submission: 1
- By decision: 3

Other information
- Occupation: Martial artist, coach, trainer
- Notable club: Cruz MMA Academy
- Website: cruzmma.com
- Mixed martial arts record from Sherdog

Plinio Cruz (Portuguese pronunciation: [ˈplĩnju ˈkɾus]; born November 30, 1985) is a Brazilian-American mixed martial arts coach, professional boxer, and mixed martial artist. He is the head coach and founder of Cruz MMA. He currently competes in the Heavyweight division of Misfits Boxing (MFB). As a mixed martial artist, he most notably competed in the Heavyweight division of Cage Fury Fighting Championships (CFFC), where he was the former CFFC Heavyweight Champion. He also competed in Bellator Fighting Championships, M-1 Global, and Ring of Combat (ROC).

== Early life and childhood ==
Plinio Cruz was born on November 30, 1985, in São Paulo, Brazil. Cruz started taking Judo classes at the age of three. Plinio started watching mixed martial arts (MMA) events in his youth, specifically watching the fights of Jorge “Macaco” Patino, a mixed martial artist and Brazilian jiu-jitsu practitioner. He started training martial arts at the age of 16, under Jorge and his team, the Gold Team Fighters, starting out with Brazilian jiu-jitsu (BJJ). He trained in the martial art, and after approximately six months, he was placed in the São Paulo State Jiu Jitsu Championship, which he placed third. Years later, he went to the same tournament and placed first.

== Mixed martial arts career ==
=== Early career ===
Plinio debuted in mixed martial arts at the age of 22, going 2–0 in the Ultimate Combat (UC)’s Middleweight Grand Prix, winning it on March 15, 2008.

Cruz made his MMA debut in the U.S regional scene at KAP: The Return of Macaco, facing future KSW Middleweight title challenger, Jay Silva. He won the fight via split decision.

Plinio challenged for the Ring of Combat (ROC) Middleweight Championship against the incumbent champion, Rafael Natal, at Ring of Combat 24, on April 17, 2009. He lost the fight in the second round, due to submission.

Cruz fought against Mike Geurin at WCA: Caged Combat, on June 6, 2009. He lost the fight by knockout in the third round.

On November 20, 2009, Plinio fought Ariel Sepulveda, at Ring of Combat 27. He won the fight by split decision.

=== M-1 career ===
Plinio made his M-1 debut at 2010 in M-1 Global#M-1 Selection 2010: The Americas Round 1, fighting John Doyle on April 3, 2010. He won the fight by unanimous decision.

Cruz then faced Tyson Jeffries at M-1 Selection 2010: The Americas Round 3, on August 7, 2010. He lost the fight by split decision.

Plinio fought against Magomed Sultanakhmedov in M-1 Challenge 23, on March 5, 2011. He lost the fight by technical knockout in the second round, due to punches.

==== Bellator debut ====
Plinio made his Bellator debut against Duane Bastress at Bellator 65, on April 13, 2012. He lost the fight by technical knockout in the second round, by elbows.

=== CFFC career ===
Cruz then made his Cage Fury Fighting Championships (CFFC) debut against J.A. Dudley at Cage Fury FC 34, on April 19, 2014. He won the fight by armbar in the first round.

Plinio then fought the incumbent champion, Azunna "Zu" Anyanwu, for the CFFC Heavyweight Championship. The pair fought at Cage Fury FC 43, on November 1, 2014. Cruz won the fight by unanimous decision, therefore winning the CFFC Heavyweight Championship.

Cruz then rematched Azunna in his first title defense at Cage Fury FC 50, on July 18, 2015. He lost the fight via split decision, losing the championship in the process.

In his next fight, Plinio faced former champion, Joe Stripling, at Cage Fury FC 55, on January 9, 2016. He won the fight by unanimous decision.

On May 21, 2016, Cruz rematched against Azunna Anyanwu, this time for the vacant CFFC Heavyweight Championship, at Cage Fury FC 58. He lost the fight by majority decision.

Plinio then faced future UFC contender, Chris Daukaus, at Cage Fury FC 69. They fought on December 16, 2017, where Plinio lost the fight by knockout in the first round.

=== Retirement from MMA ===
After a long hiatus, Plinio returned to competition and fought Douglas Humberto, at Future FC 6, on June 28, 2019, in a Super heavyweight bout. He lost the fight by knockout in the third round. After this fight, he retired from mixed martial arts to focus on full-time coaching.

== Coaching career ==
In 2013, Plinio opened his own martial arts gym, the Cruz MMA Academy, in Newark, New Jersey. He is the head coach and owner of the establishment. Over the years, he has been described as one of the best coaches in the world. His most notable achievement as a coach is winning the 2024 "Coach of the Year" award at the 16th edition of the World MMA Awards. Some of his most notable students are the two-division GLORY and UFC champion, Alex Pereira, the former UFC Light Heavyweight Champion, Glover Teixeira, the color commentator and former mixed martial artist Laura Sanko, and King Edokpolo.

== Boxing career ==
=== Plinio vs. Olive ===
In 2026, Plinio announced a return to combat sports. On August 31, BoxRec leaked that Cruz would face MFB heavyweight champion Chase DeMoor on the undercard of the Deen the Great vs. Henry Cejudo in a professional bout. On September 19, Misfits Boxing announced that the bout had been rescheduled and would now take place as the co-feature on the Joey Essex vs. Dapper Laughs card for October 10 at the Copper Box Arena in London for the MFB title. However, DeMoor withdrew due to an eye injury. On the night, Cruz fought DeMoor's trainer Gary Olive and won via technical knockout in the second round.

After the fight, Cruz called out DeMoor in his post-fight interview, calling for a rescheduling of the bout between each other.

== Personal life ==
Plinio is an American citizen, achieving naturalized citizenship in December 2021.

== Championships and accomplishments ==
=== Mixed martial arts ===
- Cage Fury Fighting Championships (CFFC)
  - CFFC Heavyweight Championship (One time)
- Ultimate Combat (UC)
  - 2008 Ultimate Combat Middleweight Grand Prix Champion

=== Coaching ===
- World MMA Awards
  - 2023-24 Shawn Tompkins Coach of the Year

== Mixed martial arts record ==
Professional record breakdown
17 matches	8 wins	9 losses
By knockout	1	5
By submission	2	1
By decision	5	3

Res.	Record	Opponent	Method	Event	Date	Round	Time	Location	Notes
Loss	8–9	Douglas Humberto	TKO (punch)	Future FC 6	June 28, 2019	3	3:57	São Paulo, Brazil	Super Heavyweight debut.
Loss	8–8	Chris Daukaus	KO (punch)	Cage Fury FC 69	December 16, 2017	1	2:38	Atlantic City, New Jersey, United States	
Loss	8–7	Azunna Anyanwu	Decision (majority)	Cage Fury FC 58	May 12, 2016	4	5:00	Atlantic City, New Jersey, United States	For the vacant CFFC Heavyweight Championship.
Win	8–6	Joe Stripling	Decision (unanimous)	Cage Fury FC 55	January 9, 2016	3	5:00	Atlantic City, New Jersey, United States	
Loss	7–6	Azunna Anyanwu	Decision (split)	Cage Fury FC 50	July 18, 2015	3	5:00	Atlantic City, New Jersey, United States	Lost the CFFC Heavyweight Championship.
Win	7–5	Azunna Anyanwu	Decision (unanimous)	Cage Fury FC 43	November 1, 2014	3	5:00	Atlantic City, New Jersey, United States	Won the CFFC Heavyweight Championship.
Win	6–5	J.A. Dudley	Submission (armbar)	Cage Fury FC 34	April 29, 2014	1	4:12	Atlantic City, New Jersey, United States	Heavyweight debut.
Loss	5–5	Duane Bastress	TKO (punches)	Bellator 65	April 13, 2012	2	2:52	Atlantic City, New Jersey, United States	
Loss	5–4	Magomed Sultanakhmedov	TKO (punches)	M-1 Challenge 23	March 5, 2011	2	1:13	Moscow, Russia	
Loss	5–3	Tyson Jeffries	Decision (split)	M-1 Selection 2010: The Americas Round 3	August 7, 2010	3	5:00	Atlantic City, New Jersey, United States	
Win	5–2	John Doyle	Decision (unanimous)	M-1 Selection 2010: The Americas Round 1	April 3, 2010	3	5:00	Atlantic City, New Jersey, United States	
Win	4–2	Ariel Sepulveda	Decision (split)	Ring of Combat 27	November 20, 2009	3	5:00	Atlantic City, New Jersey, United States	
Loss	3–2	Mike Geurin	KO (punch)	WCA: Caged Combat	June 6, 2009	3	2:54	Atlantic City, New Jersey, United States	
Loss	3–1	Rafael Natal	Submission (rear-naked choke)	Ring of Combat 24	April 17, 2009	2	3:13	Atlantic City, New Jersey, United States	For the Ring of Combat Middleweight Championship.
Win	3–0	Jay Silva	Decision (split)	Karriem Abdallah Productions: The Return of Macaco	February 7, 2009	3	5:00	Newark, New Jersey, United States	
Win	2–0	Fabio Bomba	Submission (rear-naked choke)	Ultimate Combat Grand Prix	March 15, 2008	1	3:50	São Paulo, Brazil	Won the Ultimate Combat Middleweight Grand Prix.
Win	1–0	Thiago Cardoso	KO (punches)	Ultimate Combat Grand Prix	March 15, 2008	1	2:50	São Paulo, Brazil	Middleweight debut. Ultimate Combat Middleweight Grand Prix Semifinal.

== MF–Professional boxing record ==
1 fight	1 win	0 losses
By knockout	1	0

No.	Result	Record	Opponent	Type	Round, time	Date	Location	Notes
1	Win	1–0	Gary Olive	TKO	2 (3), 0:58	Oct 10, 2026	Copper Box Arena, London, England	
