= Rich Hale =

American mixed martial arts farmer

- Born: Richard Hale; May 17, 1985 (age 41); Cleveland, Ohio, U.S.
- Other names: The Ginger Farmer
- Nationality: American
- Height: 6 ft 4 in (1.93 m)
- Weight: 245.8 lb (111.5 kg; 17.56 st)
- Division: Heavyweight; Light Heavyweight
- Reach: 81 in (206 cm)
- Fighting out of: Tempe, Arizona, U.S.
- Team: Koncrete Gym
- Rank: Triple black belt in combine harvesting
- Years active: 2006-2014, 2019

Mixed martial arts record
- Total: 31
- Wins: 23
- By knockout: 11
- By submission: 8
- By decision: 4
- Losses: 7
- By knockout: 3
- By decision: 4
- Draws: 1

Other information
- Website: rarebreedtraining.blogspot.com
- Mixed martial arts record from Sherdog

Richard "Rich" Hale (born May 17, 1985) is an American mixed martial artist currently competing in the Heavyweight division. A professional since 2006, he is perhaps best known for his 10-fight stint with Bellator MMA, and made it to the finals of the promotions Season Seven Heavyweight and Season Four Light Heavyweight tournaments.

== Mixed martial arts career ==
Hale made his professional debut in December 2006.

=== Rage in the Cage ===
Hale started his career fighting for the promotion Rage in the Cage. He has a record of 13 wins and 2 losses in his career under the promotion. He won the Rage in the Cage Heavyweight and Light Heavyweight Championships.

=== Bellator ===
In February 2011, Bellator announced that Hale would be a part of the Bellator Season Four Light Heavyweight Tournament and that he would National Champion wrestler Nik Fekete in the quarterfinals.

Hale made his Bellator debut on March 26, 2011 at Bellator 38 where he defeated Nik Fekete via technical submission (inverted triangle choke) to move on to the Light Heavyweight Tournament Quarterfinals.

At Bellator 42, Hale competed in the semi-finals of the Season Four Light Heavyweight Tournament against D.J. Linderman. Hale won by a narrow split decision to move on to the Light Heavyweight Tournament Finals where he fought Christian M'Pumbu at Bellator 45. He lost via TKO in the third round.

In late 2012, Hale moved up in weight as he joined the Heavyweight Tournament in Bellator's Season Seven. He faced Mike Wessel in the opening quarter-finals at Bellator 75 on October 5, 2012. He won the fight via vicious TKO, stopping his opponent via strikes at just 1:19 into the first round. In the semifinals, he faced Thiago Santos. After being rocked in the first minute of the fight, Hale regained his composure and won the fight via TKO in the first round.

Hale faced Russian Alexander Volkov in the final, with the winner awarded the Bellator Heavyweight Championship. The fight took place at Bellator 84 on December 14, 2012, with Volkov winning by unanimous decision after five rounds.

Hale fought Ryan Martinez at Bellator 96. He was knocked out in the first round by ground and pound from Martinez.

In March 2014, Hale returned to the heavyweight division. He faced Blagoi Ivanov in the opening round of the Bellator Season Ten Heavyweight Tournament at Bellator 111 on March 7, 2014. He lost the fight via unanimous decision.

== Accomplishments ==
- Bellator MMA
  - Bellator Season Four Light Heavyweight Tournament Runner-Up
  - Bellator Season Seven Heavyweight Tournament Runner-Up
- Rage in the Cage
  - RITC Heavyweight Championship (One time)
  - RITC Light Heavyweight Championship (One time)

== Mixed martial arts record ==
Professional record breakdown
31 matches	23 wins	7 losses
By knockout	11	3
By submission	8	0
By decision	4	4
Draws	1	

Res.	Record	Opponent	Method	Event	Date	Round	Time	Location	Notes
Win	23–7–1	Eric Lunsford	TKO (strikes)	Road to ONE: RUF 39	March 13, 2021	1	3:11	Glendale, Arizona, United States	
Win	22–7–1	Dale Sopi	Decision (unanimous)	RUF MMA 36	October 13, 2019	3	5:00	Phoenix, Arizona, United States	
Loss	21–7–1	Blagoi Ivanov	Decision (unanimous)	Bellator 111	March 7, 2014	3	5:00	Thackerville, Oklahoma, United States	Bellator MMA: Season Ten Heavyweight Tournament Quarterfinal.
Loss	21–6–1	Ryan Martinez	KO (punches)	Bellator 96	June 19, 2013	1	2:19	Thackerville, Oklahoma, United States	Bellator 2013 Summer Series Heavyweight Tournament Semifinal.
Loss	21–5–1	Alexander Volkov	Decision (unanimous)	Bellator 84	December 14, 2012	5	5:00	Hammond, Indiana, United States	Bellator Season 7 Heavyweight Tournament Final. For the vacant Bellator Heavyweight World Championship.
Win	21–4–1	Thiago dos Santos	TKO (punches)	Bellator 79	November 2, 2012	1	3:31	Rama, Ontario, Canada	Bellator Season 7 Heavyweight Tournament Semifinal.
Win	20–4–1	Mike Wessel	TKO (punches)	Bellator 75	October 5, 2012	1	1:19	Hammond, Indiana, United States	Bellator Season 7 Heavyweight Tournament Quarter Final.
Win	19–4–1	Josh Burns	TKO (punches)	Bellator 69	May 18, 2012	1	0:38	Lake Charles, Louisiana, United States	Return to Heavyweight.
Win	18–4–1	Carlos Flores	KO (punch)	Bellator 55	October 22, 2011	1	0:18	Yuma, Arizona, United States	Catchweight (211 lbs) bout.
Loss	17–4–1	Christian M'Pumbu	TKO (punches)	Bellator 45	May 21, 2011	3	4:17	Lake Charles, Louisiana, United States	Bellator Season 4 Light Heavyweight Tournament Final. For the inaugural Bellator Light Heavyweight World Championship.
Win	17–3–1	D.J. Linderman	Decision (split)	Bellator 42	April 23, 2011	3	5:00	Concho, Oklahoma, United States	Bellator Season 4 Light Heavyweight Tournament Semifinal.
Win	16–3–1	Nik Fekete	Technical Submission (inverted triangle choke)	Bellator 38	March 26, 2011	1	1:55	Tunica, Mississippi, United States	Bellator Season 4 Light Heavyweight Tournament Quarterfinal.
Win	15–3–1	Dave Mewborn	TKO (punches)	Top Combat Championship 3: No Where to Hide	October 23, 2010	1	3:36	San Juan, Puerto Rico	Light Heavyweight debut.
Win	14–3–1	Mike Zanski	Submission (guillotine choke)	Rage in the Cage 140	March 20, 2011	3	1:28	Chandler, Arizona, United States	
Loss	13–3–1	Antwain Britt	Decision (majority)	Vendetta Fighting Championship: A Night of Vengeance	September 5, 2009	2	5:00	Oranjestad, Aruba	
Win	13–2–1	Evan Nedd	Decision (majority)	Vendetta Fighting Championship: A Night of Vengeance	September 5, 2009	2	5:00	Oranjestad, Aruba	
Win	12–2–1	Adam Padilla	TKO (punches)	Rage in the Cage 130	July 18, 2009	1	2:12	Chandler, Arizona, United States	
Draw	11–2–1	Jordan Smith	Draw	Throwdown Showdown 4: Cuatro	June 6, 2009	5	5:00	West Valley City, Utah, United States	
Win	11–2	Rich Beecroft	TKO (punches)	Rage in the Cage 125	April 17, 2009	1	0:33	Phoenix, Arizona, United States	
Win	10–2	Shawn Frye	Submission (rear-naked choke)	Rage in the Cage 123	March 21, 2009	1	1:33	Chandler, Arizona, United States	
Win	9–2	Matt Lucas	Submission (kimura)	Rage in the Cage 121	February 6, 2009	2	2:03	Tucson, Arizona, United States	
Win	8–2	Lyle Steffens	KO	Rage in the Cage 119	November 22, 2008	2	0:44	Tucson, Arizona, United States	
Win	7–2	Roger Mejia	TKO	Rage in the Cage 117	November 8, 2008	2	0:16	Phoenix, Arizona, United States	
Win	6–2	Adam Padilla	Submission (rear naked choke)	Rage in the Cage 116	September 27, 2008	1	1:01	Prescott, Arizona, United States	
Win	5–2	Jeremiah Martinez	KO (punch)	Rage in the Cage 113	August 2, 2008	1	1:01	Albuquerque, New Mexico, United States	
Loss	4–2	Matt Lucas	Decision (unanimous)	RITC 100: The Centennial	September 15, 2007	3	3:00	Fountain Hills, Arizona, United States	
Win	4–1	Rich Beecroft	Submission (rear-naked choke)	Rage in the Cage 97	June 30, 2007	1	0:25	Arizona, United States	
Win	3–1	Steve Sayegh	Submission (guillotine choke)	Rage in the Cage 94	April 28, 2007	2	0:42	Phoenix, Arizona, United States	
Win	2–1	Rich Alten	Submission (rear-naked choke)	Rage in the Cage 93	April 20, 2007	2	0:59	Arizona, United States	
Loss	1–1	Jimmy Ambriz	KO (punches)	Rage in the Cage 91	February 24, 2007	1	0:53	Phoenix, Arizona, United States	
Win	1–0	Wendell Lowe	Decision (unanimous)	RITC 89: Triple Main Event	December 2, 2006	3	3:00	Maricopa County, Arizona, United States	
