= Renê Nazare =

Brazilian mixed martial artist

- Born: September 3, 1982 (age 44); Rio de Janeiro, Brazil
- Other names: The Brazilian Bomber
- Height: 5 ft 9 in (1.75 m)
- Weight: 155 lb (70 kg; 11.1 st)
- Division: Lightweight
- Fighting out of: Ithaca, New York
- Team: Team Bomb Squad
- Rank: black belt in Brazilian jiu-jitsu
- Years active: 2004-present

Mixed martial arts record
- Total: 13
- Wins: 10
- By knockout: 4
- By submission: 4
- By decision: 2
- Losses: 3
- By submission: 1
- By decision: 2

Other information
- Website: Homepage (web.archive.org)
- Mixed martial arts record from Sherdog

Renê Nazare
Medal record

Representing Brazil

Men's Brazilian Jiu-Jitsu

World Jiu-Jitsu Championship
Gold medal – first place	2001	Featherweight (blue)

World Cup
Gold medal – first place	2007	Lightweight (black)
Silver medal – second place	2004	Lightweight (brown)
Gold medal – first place	2003	Lightweight (purple)

Renê Nazare-Azevedo, also known as simply Nazare, is a Brazilian professional mixed martial artist who previously competed Bellator's Lightweight division.

== Background ==
Nazare is an MMA competitor and was previously a jiu-jitsu Instructor at Team Bombsquad. For twelve years, he dedicated himself to the art of Brazilian jiu-jitsu. Rene expressed talent and interest in jiu-jitsu at a young age and studied under 3rd degree black belt instructor, Rodrigo Antonio Garcia Da Silva.

As an experienced fighter for Nova Uniao Jiu-Jitsu Club and Club Feijao Jiu-Jitsu, four time medalist, and a nine year veteran instructor, Rene operates his own jiu-jitus gym in Warrington, Pennsylvania.

== Mixed martial arts career ==
Nazare made his professional mixed martial arts debut in May 2004 where he defeated Thiago Cabelo at Body Fight 1 by TKO (Punches) in round 1. He then went on to win his next 6 fights to get him a fight in Bellator.

=== Bellator ===
In his Bellator debut, he fought PRIDE veteran Luiz Azeredo at Bellator 39 and won by TKO.

On April 27, 2011, it was announced that Bellator signed him and he will take place in the upcoming Season Seven Lightweight Tournament. He faced Ricardo Tirloni in the opening round of the tournament on October 19, 2012 at Bellator 77. He lost the fight via submission in the second round.

== Championships and accomplishments ==
=== Mixed martial arts ===
- Reality Fighting
  - Reality Fighting Lightweight Championship (One time)

=== Submission grappling ===
- International Brazilian Jiu-Jitsu Federation
  - 2001 IBJJF World Jiu-Jitsu Championship Blue Belt Gold Medalist
- Confederação Brasileira de Jiu Jitsu Olímpico
  - 2007 CBJJO World Cup Black Belt Gold Medalist
  - 2004 CBJJO World Cup Brown Belt Silver Medalist
  - 2003 CBJJO World Cup Purple Belt Gold Medalist

== Mixed martial arts record ==
Professional record breakdown
13 matches	10 wins	3 losses
By knockout	4	0
By submission	4	1
By decision	2	2

Res.	Record	Opponent	Method	Event	Date	Round	Time	Location	Notes
Loss	10–3	Ricardo Tirloni	Submission (D'arce choke)	Bellator 77	October 19, 2012	2	1:14	Reading, Pennsylvania, United States	Bellator Season 7 Lightweight Tournament Quarterfinal
Loss	10–2	Thiago Michel	Decision (split)	Bellator 62	March 23, 2012	3	5:00	Laredo, Texas, United States	Bellator Season 6 Lightweight Tournament Quarterfinal
Loss	10–1	Jacob Kirwan	Decision (unanimous)	Bellator 54	October 15, 2011	3	5:00	Atlantic City, New Jersey, United States	
Win	10–0	Juan Barrantes	TKO (doctor stoppage)	Bellator 48	August 20, 2011	2	5:00	Uncasville, Connecticut, United States	
Win	9–0	Kalvin Hackney	Submission (rear-naked choke)	Bellator 45	May 21, 2011	1	4:44	Lake Charles, Louisiana, United States	
Win	8–0	Luiz Azeredo	TKO (arm injury)	Bellator 39	April 2, 2011	1	5:00	San Jacinto, California, United States	
Win	7–0	Jeff Anderson	Submission (rear-naked choke)	CFX 13: Rumble in the Jungle 5	March 12, 2011	1	2:06	Plymouth, Massachusetts, United States	
Win	6–0	Muzaffar Abdurakhmanov	Submission (armbar)	FFP: Untamed 29	August 29, 2009	1	3:07	Marlborough, Massachusetts, United States	
Win	5–0	Anthony Leate	Submission (rear-naked choke)	Reality Fighting: Throwdown	May 2, 2009	1	2:51	Plymouth, Massachusetts, United States	Won Lightweight Title
Win	4–0	Brian McLaughlin	Decision (split)	Reality Fighting: Apocalypse	January 17, 2009	3	3:00	Plymouth, Massachusetts, United States	
Win	3–0	Vincent Sylvestre	TKO (punches)	FFP: Untamed 25	December 6, 2008	1	4:03	Boxborough, Massachusetts, United States	
Win	2–0	Steve Barnett	Decision (unanimous)	Reality Fighting: Collision	July 19, 2008	5	5:00	Plymouth, Massachusetts, United States	
Win	1–0	Thiago Cabelo	TKO (punches)	Body Fight 1	May 1, 2004	1	1:45	Maringá, Brazil	
