= Mike Wessel =

American mixed martial arts fighter

- Born: Michael Wade Wessel; December 2, 1977 (age 48); Celina, Ohio, U.S.
- Other names: The Juggernaut
- Height: 6 ft 0 in (1.83 m)
- Weight: 255.5 lb (115.9 kg; 18.25 st)
- Division: Heavyweight
- Reach: 71 in (180 cm)
- Fighting out of: Little Rock, Arkansas, United States
- Team: Westside Fight Team
- Years active: 2007-present

Mixed martial arts record
- Total: 23
- Wins: 15
- By knockout: 8
- By submission: 1
- By decision: 6
- Losses: 8
- By knockout: 7
- By submission: 1

Other information
- Mixed martial arts record from Sherdog

Michael Wade Wessel (born December 2, 1977) is an American mixed martial artist who last competed in 2016. A professional competitor since 2007, Wessel formerly competed for the Ultimate Fighting Championship, Bellator, and was a contestant on The Ultimate Fighter: Heavyweights.

== Background ==
Born and raised in Celina, Ohio, Wessel played football at Celina High School as a defensive tackle and was talented, earning a scholarship to the University of St. Francis where he played nose tackle. Wessel also went to training camps for both the Kansas City Chiefs and San Diego Chargers but was cut in both appearances. Wessel later competed for Arena Football League teams in North Dakota and San Diego for three-and-a-half seasons before accepting a strength and conditioning coaching job at the University of Arkansas. It was during his time in Arkansas when Wessel began to train mixed martial arts.

== Mixed martial arts ==
=== Ultimate Fighting Championship ===
He made his UFC debut against Antoni Hardonk at UFC 92. He accepted the fight on a week notice after Hardonk's original opponent dropped out due to injury. UFC's Dana White offered the fight to Wessel and he quickly accepted, signing a four-fight deal. Wessel lost in the second round via TKO stoppage after tiring from only having a few days to train.

=== The Ultimate Fighter ===
After losing to Hardonk in his UFC debut, Wessel took a spot on the Spike TV reality show, The Ultimate Fighter: Heavyweights. He was the last pick for Team Rashad Evans. Wessel had his first fight on the show against Marcus Jones, losing via first round submission armbar.

Wessel was not given a chance to fight on the finale card. After losing to Jones, Wessel was released from his contract.

=== Post-UFC ===
Wessel's first fight after his stint on The Ultimate Fighter: Heavyweights, was against another Ultimate Fighter alumni, Dan Christison. Wessel lost the fight via submission kimura.

Wessel also faced Bellator's veteran Scott Barrett and Strikeforce's veteran Matt Kovacs, losing against Barrett and winning against Kovacs.

In the second half of 2012, Wessel signed with Bellator.

=== Bellator MMA ===
Wessel made his debut on August 24, 2012, at Bellator 73 against fellow newcomer Ryan Martinez. He won via split decision (29-28 Wessel, 30-27 Martinez, 29-28 Wessel).

Wessel next entered the Bellator season seven heavyweight tournament, facing Rich Hale on October 5, 2012, at Bellator 75 for a spot in the semifinals. Hale defeated Wessel via TKO in the first round.

Wessel faced Alexei Kudin on December 7, 2012, at Bellator 83. He won via unanimous decision (29–28, 29–28, 29–28).

Wessel then faced Justin Frazier at Bellator 120 on May 17, 2014. He defeated Frazier via first round TKO.

Wessel faced Josh Diekmann at Bellator 123 on September 5, 2014. He lost the fight via knockout in the first round.

Wessel faced Frank Tate at Bellator 162 on October 21, 2016. He won the fight via unanimous decision.

== Mixed martial arts record ==
Professional record breakdown
23 matches	15 wins	8 losses
By knockout	8	7
By submission	1	1
By decision	6	0

Res.	Record	Opponent	Method	Event	Date	Round	Time	Location	Notes
Win	15–8	Frank Tate	Decision (unanimous)	Bellator 162	October 21, 2016	3	5:00	Memphis, Tennessee, United States	
Loss	14–8	Josh Diekmann	KO (punches)	Bellator 123	September 5, 2014	1	0:47	Uncasville, Connecticut, United States	
Win	14–7	Justin Frazier	TKO (punches)	Bellator 120	May 17, 2014	1	4:28	Southaven, Mississippi, United States	
Loss	13–7	Michal Kita	TKO (punches)	Pro MMA Challenge 1: Drwal vs. Heleno	March 1, 2014	1	2:11	Wrocław, Poland	
Loss	13–6	Robert Neal	TKO (punches)	PFMMAC: PrizeFight MMA Championships	July 13, 2013	1	0:13	Tunica, Mississippi, United States	For the PrizeFight Heavyweight Championship.
Win	13–5	Alexei Kudin	Decision (unanimous)	Bellator 83	December 7, 2012	3	5:00	Atlantic City, New Jersey, United States	
Loss	12–5	Rich Hale	TKO (punches)	Bellator 75	October 5, 2012	1	1:19	Hammond, Indiana, United States	Bellator Season Seven Heavyweight Tournament Quarterfinal.
Win	12–4	Ryan Martinez	Decision (split)	Bellator 73	August 24, 2012	3	5:00	Tunica Resorts, Mississippi, United States	
Win	11–4	Matt Kovacs	TKO (punches)	SF: ShoFight 20	June 16, 2012	2	4:50	Springfield, Missouri, United States	
Loss	10–4	Scott Barrett	TKO (punches)	SportFight X: Middle Tennessee Mayhem	January 29, 2011	1	3:53	Murfreesboro, Tennessee, United States	
Win	10–3	Chris Hawk	TKO (punches)	AXC 10: War of the Machines	October 9, 2010	1	2:19	Little Rock, Arkansas, United States	
Win	9–3	Jack Armstrong	TKO (punches)	AXC 8: Friday Fury	June 18, 2010	1	2:39	Little Rock, Arkansas, United States	
Loss	8–3	Dan Christison	Submission (kimura)	CFC 4: Wessel vs. Christison	February 26, 2010	3	3:56	Winnipeg, Manitoba, Canada	
Loss	8–2	Antoni Hardonk	TKO (punches)	UFC 92	December 27, 2008	2	2:09	Las Vegas, Nevada, United States	
Win	8–1	Aaron Winterlee	Submission	Subzero Fighting	August 2, 2008	1	1:59	Little Rock, Arkansas, United States	
Win	7–1	Rudy Lindsey	Decision (unanimous)	Extreme Fighting League	May 17, 2008	2	5:00	Oklahoma, United States	
Win	6–1	Patrick Castillo	Decision (split)	AOW: GIs vs. Pros	April 19, 2008	3	5:00	Tunica, Mississippi, United States	
Win	5–1	Mark Bier	TKO (punches)	Ring Rulers	March 8, 2008	1	0:45	Shreveport, Louisiana, United States	
Win	4–1	Matt Thomas	TKO (punches)	Subzero Fighting	January 12, 2008	1	N/A	Little Rock, Arkansas, United States	
Win	3–1	Matt Thomas	KO (punches)	AOW: Art of War 4	October 27, 2007	1	2:42	Tunica, Mississippi, United States	
Loss	2–1	Aaron Wintterle	KO (punch)	Xtreme Fighting League	August 11, 2007	2	0:28	Alabama, United States	
Win	2–0	Rudy Lindsey	Decision (unanimous)	Xtreme Fighting League	August 11, 2007	3	2:00	Alabama, United States	
Win	1–0	Jason Lee	TKO (punches)	Xtreme Fighting League	August 11, 2007	3	1:18	Alabama, United States	

=== Mixed martial arts exhibition record ===
Exhibition record breakdown		
1 match	0 wins	1 loss
By submission	0	1

Res.	Record	Opponent	Method	Event	Date	Round	Time	Location	Notes
Loss	0–1	Marcus Jones	Submission (armbar)	The Ultimate Fighter: Heavyweights		1		Las Vegas, Nevada, United States	Preliminary Bout.
