= Alliance MMA =

Mixed martial arts promoter based in New York City

Alliance MMA Inc.
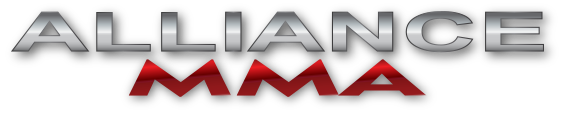
- Company type: Public
- Industry: Mixed martial arts promotion
- Founded: February 2015; 11 years ago
- Founder: Joseph Gamberale
- Headquarters: New York City, New York, U.S.
- Website: alliancemma.com

Alliance MMA Inc. is a mixed martial arts organization offering promotional opportunities for aspiring fighters to showcase their talent and advance to further professional competitions. Alliance MMA's mission is to identify and develop the next generation of Ultimate Fighting Championship (UFC) and other leading MMA promotion champions including The World Series of Fighting and Bellator.

The organization aims to eventually host in excess of 125 events per year, showcasing more than 1,000 fighters. Alliance MMA generates original sports content with the intention of attracting an international fan base and securing major brand sponsorship revenue for live MMA events, digital media, and Alliance MMA fighters.

MMA is a full-contact sport that allows a wide range of fighting techniques including, striking and grappling from various martial arts and disciplines, including Boxing, Wrestling, Brazilian Jiu Jitsu, Karate and Muay Thai. Professional MMA fights are legal and regulated by state athletic commissions in all 50 states.

== History ==
Alliance MMA, Inc. was incorporated in February 2015 for the purpose of acquiring businesses that engage in the promotion of mixed martial arts (MMA) events. The company was founded by Joseph Gamberale and day-to-day operations are being overseen by Chairman and CEO Paul Danner and President Robert Haydak.

In 2016 the company announced the acquisitions of seven companies, including five MMA promotion companies, a digital media sports platform, and an electronic ticking platform optimized for marketing MMA events. In October 2016, Alliance MMA completed their initial public offering and began trading on the NASDAQ, making it the only public entity in the MMA space and first to trade on a major market.

== Promotions ==
- Cagetix
- Combat Games MMA (COGA)
- GoFightLive! (GFL)
- Hoosier Fight Club (HFC)
- Iron Tiger
- National Fighting Championship
- Shogun Fights
- SoCa Fights
- V3Fights
- Victory Fighting Championship

== See also ==
- List of professional MMA training camps
