= Ryan Martinez (fighter) =

American mixed martial artist

- Born: August 9, 1982 (age 44); Greeley, Colorado, U.S.
- Height: 5 ft 11 in (1.80 m)
- Weight: 257 lb (117 kg; 18.4 st)
- Division: Super Heavyweight; Heavyweight
- Reach: 72 in (183 cm)
- Stance: Southpaw
- Fighting out of: Greeley, Colorado, United States
- Team: Infinite MMA
- Years active: 2009-2014

Mixed martial arts record
- Total: 15
- Wins: 10
- By knockout: 5
- By submission: 2
- By decision: 3
- Losses: 5
- By knockout: 4
- By decision: 1

Other information
- Mixed martial arts record from Sherdog

Ryan Martinez (born August 27, 1982) is an American retired mixed martial artist. A professional from 2009 until 2014, he competed for Bellator and ProElite.

== Background ==
Martinez was born in Greeley, Colorado. He grew up wrestling and had a promising future, being a top ranked wrestler in the state of Colorado (third in the country as a senior) while at Greeley West High School, and a two-time All-American. The young Martinez was offered full-scholarships from many different colleges, but began getting involved with drugs and alcohol, and eventually dropped out of high school as he began dealing drugs.

Martinez was addicted to methamphetamines and was arrested once for drug trafficking. He spent three and a half years in prison and two years on parole. The time in prison was especially hard on Martinez because he missed the first two years of his daughter Taylor's life.

After his time in prison, he got a job as an ironworker and started to train MMA, which helped him to overcome his past.

== Mixed martial arts career ==
=== Early career ===
After a successful amateur career, Martinez began as a professional in 2010. He fought mainly for the Colorado-based promotion Fight To Win. With a MMA record of 5–1, he signed with ProElite.

=== ProElite ===
Martinez made his debut against former NCAA division I national wrestling champion Mark Ellis on November 5, 2011, in the opening round of the heavyweight tournament. He won via unanimous decision and advanced to the semifinal.

In the semifinal on January 21, 2012, Martinez faced Cody Griffin. He won via unanimous decision.

Martinez was expected to face Richard Odoms in the finals, but in early 2012 ProElite has entered into a partnership with DREAM, which has gone out of business soon after. Martinez then signed with Bellator.

=== Bellator Fighting Championships ===
Martinez made his debut against Mike Wessel on August 24, 2012, at Bellator 73. He lost via split decision (29-28 Wessel, 30-27 Martinez, 29-28 Wessel).

Martinez faced Manny Lara on October 5, 2012, at Bellator 75. He won via majority decision (29-27, 29-27, 28-28).

Martinez faced Travis Wiuff on March 21, 2013, at Bellator 93. He won via knockout in the very first round.

In June 2013, Martinez entered the Bellator Summer Series Heavyweight tournament as an injury replacement for Vinicius Queiroz. He faced Rich Hale in the opening round at Bellator 96 and won via knockout in the first round.

Martinez faced Vitaly Minakov in the finals on July 31, 2013, at Bellator 97. He lost via TKO in the third round.

Martinez then fought Lavar Johnson in the quarterfinals of Bellator's Season Ten Heavyweight tournament at Bellator 111. He lost via TKO in the first round.

Martinez faced Nick Rossborough on September 26, 2014, at Bellator 126. He lost the fight via TKO due to injury after tearing his left bicep in the first round.

== Championships and accomplishments ==
- Bellator Fighting Championships
  - Bellator 2013 Summer Series Heavyweight Tournament Runner-Up

== Mixed martial arts record ==
Professional record breakdown
15 matches	10 wins	5 losses
By knockout	5	4
By submission	2	0
By decision	3	1

Res.	Record	Opponent	Method	Event	Date	Round	Time	Location	Notes
Loss	10–5	Nick Rossborough	TKO (arm injury)	Bellator 126	September 26, 2014	1	5:00	Phoenix, Arizona, United States	Martinez tore his left bicep in round one.
Loss	10–4	Lavar Johnson	TKO (punches)	Bellator 111	March 7, 2014	1	4:22	Thackerville, Oklahoma, United States	Bellator Season 10 Heavyweight Tournament Quarterfinal.
Loss	10–3	Vitaly Minakov	TKO (punches)	Bellator 97	July 31, 2013	3	4:02	Rio Rancho, New Mexico, United States	Bellator 2013 Summer Series Heavyweight Tournament Final.
Win	10–2	Rich Hale	KO (punches)	Bellator 96	June 19, 2013	1	2:19	Thackerville, Oklahoma, United States	Bellator 2013 Summer Series Heavyweight Tournament Semifinal.
Win	9–2	Travis Wiuff	KO (punches)	Bellator 93	March 21, 2013	1	0:18	Lewiston, Maine, United States	
Win	8–2	Manny Lara	Decision (majority)	Bellator 75	October 5, 2012	3	5:00	Hammond, Indiana, United States	
Loss	7–2	Mike Wessel	Decision (split)	Bellator 73	August 24, 2012	3	5:00	Tunica Resorts, Mississippi, United States	
Win	7–1	Cody Griffin	Decision (unanimous)	ProElite 3: Da Spyder vs. Minowaman	January 21, 2012	3	5:00	Honolulu, Hawaii, United States	ProElite Heavyweight Tournament Semifinal.
Win	6–1	Mark Ellis	Decision (unanimous)	ProElite 2: Big Guns	November 5, 2011	3	5:00	Moline, Illinois, United States	ProElite Heavyweight Tournament Quarterfinal.
Win	5–1	Brandon Endriss	Technical submission (guillotine choke)	ROF 41: Bragging Rights	August 20, 2011	1	3:45	Broomfield, Colorado, United States	
Win	4–1	Richard White	TKO (submission to punches)	Fight To Win: Outlaws	May 14, 2011	1	2:24	Denver, Colorado, United States	
Win	3–1	Jeremiah Martinez	TKO (punches)	Fight To Win: Mortal Combat	February 25, 2011	1	0:51	Denver, Colorado, United States	
Loss	2–1	Derrick Lewis	TKO (punches)	Fight to Win/King of Champions: Worlds Collide	July 24, 2010	2	1:03	Denver, Colorado, United States	
Win	2–0	Justyn Riley	KO (punch)	Fight To Win: War	April 17, 2010	1	0:26	Denver, Colorado, United States	
Win	1–0	Vernon Lewis	TKO (punches)	Fight To Win: Phenoms	January 30, 2010	2	3:22	Denver, Colorado, United States	

=== Mixed martial arts amateur record ===
Res.	Record	Opponent	Method	Event	Date	Round	Time	Location	Notes
Win	4–0	Omar Belal	KO (suplex and punches)	RMBB: MMA Madness	August 14, 2009	1	0:54	Sheridan, Colorado, United States	
Win	3–0	Donnie Bell	TKO (punches)	RMBB: Battle in the Cage: Total Domination	June 5, 2009	1	0:13	Sheridan, Colorado, United States	
Win	2–0	Emanuel Martinez	TKO (punches)	RMBB: Baddest of the Bad	April 17, 2009	1	0:34	Sheridan, Colorado, United States	
Win	1–0	Shawn Martin	TKO (punches)	RMBB: Battle of the Belts	January 23, 2009	1	0:19	Sheridan, Colorado, United States	
