= Rudy Bears =

American mixed martial arts fighter

- Born: Rudy Bears; November 12, 1978 (age 47); Independence, Missouri, U.S.
- Other names: Bad News
- Nationality: American
- Height: 5 ft 11 in (1.80 m)
- Weight: 172.5 lb (78.2 kg; 12.32 st)
- Division: Welterweight; Middleweight
- Reach: 71 in (180 cm)
- Fighting out of: Kansas City, Missouri, United States
- Team: Caveman Crew
- Rank: Black Belt in Kenpo Karate; Black Belt in American Jiu-Kitsu; Orange Belt in Judo; Black Belt in Brazilian Jiu-Jitsu
- Years active: 2007-2016

Mixed martial arts record
- Total: 31
- Wins: 16
- By knockout: 5
- By submission: 8
- By decision: 3
- Losses: 15
- By knockout: 5
- By submission: 8
- By decision: 2

Other information
- Mixed martial arts record from Sherdog

Rudy Bears (born November 12, 1978) is an American former professional mixed martial artist, who competed in the Welterweight division. A professional competitor who started his career in 2007, Bears has formerly competed for Bellator, Strikeforce, Titan Fighting Championships and M-1 Global.

== Background ==
Bears is from Independence, Missouri and had a troubled upbringing, involving himself with street gangs and crime. He originally attended Van Horn High School but was caught trying to steal a car and as a result, was placed in jail for one month while looking at seven years in the penitentiary. It was during this time in jail, at the age of 17, that Bears decided to turn his life around. He wrote a heartfelt letter to the judge, who gave the young Bears a second chance. The judge released Bears on probation while in exchange Bears would have to finish high school and stay out of trouble, Bears then graduated from Truman High School and began practicing the martial arts.

== Mixed martial arts career ==
=== International Sport Combat Federation ===
Before competing in professional mixed martial arts, Bears competed as an amateur in the International Combat Sport Federation, primarily as a Middleweight, and won three ICSF titles.

=== Early professional career ===
Bears made his professional debut against future Strikeforce veteran and current UFC Lightweight, Isaac Vallie-Flagg. Bears won the bout in the first round via rear-naked choke submission. Bears then compiled a record of 10-3 with one-fight stints in the Titan Fighting Championships and M-1 Global organizations, winning both by TKO. After the TKO win for M-1 Global, in a catchweight bout of 175 lbs. Bears was invited to compete in Strikeforce.

=== Strikeforce ===
Bears made his Strikeforce and Welterweight debut against then-undefeated future UFC veteran, Tyron Woodley in the main event, Strikeforce Challengers: Woodley vs. Bears on November 20, 2009. Bears lost the fight via arm-triangle choke submission and would not return to Strikeforce, as Bears then signed with the Bellator Fighting Championships.

=== Bellator ===
Bears made his Bellator debut at Bellator 16 against Brent Weedman and was knocked out in the first round, the first knockout loss of Bear's career. He then appeared three more times for the organization, going 2-1 in his next three fights with the loss being a rematch with Zak Cummings, who had defeated Bears early in his career.

=== Titan Fighting Championships ===
After his stint in Bellator, Bears signed with the Titan Fighting Championships and made his debut for the organization against former UFC Welterweight, Jason High. Bears lost the bout via technical submission 51 seconds into the fight after refusing to tap out due to a guillotine choke submission.

After bouncing back with a win via rear-naked choke submission, Bears has lost six of his last eight fights competing for both Bellator and Titan FC.

=== Shamrock Fighting Championships ===
Following a win over Zak Bucia, Bears defeated Josh Weston via rear-naked choke submission on January 17, 2015 at Shamrock FC: Shock to earn himself the promotion's vacant Welterweight title and a Bellator contract.

=== Return to Bellator ===
Bears faced Michael Page at Bellator 140 on July 17, 2015. He lost the fight via knockout in the first round.

Bears next faced Neiman Gracie at Bellator 163 on November 4, 2016. He lost the fight via submission in the first round.

== Championships and accomplishments ==
- Shamrock Fighting Championships
  - SFC Welterweight Championship (One time)

== Mixed martial arts record ==
Professional record breakdown
31 matches	16 wins	15 losses
By knockout	5	5
By submission	8	8
By decision	3	2

Res.	Record	Opponent	Method	Event	Date	Round	Time	Location	Notes
Loss	16–15	Neiman Gracie	Submission (armbar)	Bellator 163	November 4, 2016	1	4:39	Uncasville, Connecticut, United States	Catchweight (175 lbs) bout.
Loss	16–14	Michael Page	KO (punch)	Bellator 140	July 17, 2015	1	1:05	Uncasville, Connecticut, United States	
Win	16–13	Josh Weston	Submission (rear-naked choke)	Shamrock FC: Shock	January 17, 2015	2	1:40	Kansas City, Missouri, United States	Won the vacant SFC Welterweight Championship.
Win	15–13	Zak Bucia	Decision (unanimous)	Shamrock Promotions: Impact	July 26, 2014	3	5:00	Kansas City, Missouri, United States	
Loss	14–13	Ryan Jensen	TKO (punches)	Victory Fighting Championship 39	March 30, 2013	1	1:01	Ralston, Nebraska, United States	
Loss	14–12	Igor Fernandes	Submission (anaconda choke)	Show Fighting Enterprise 1	March 1, 2013	1	2:51	Quito, Ecuador	
Loss	14–11	Paul Daley	TKO (punches)	Bellator 72	July 20, 2012	1	2:45	Tampa, Florida, United States	
Win	14–10	Nick Nolte	Submission (punches)	Titan FC 22	May 25, 2012	1	3:58	Kansas City, Kansas, United States	Catchweight (175 lbs) bout.
Loss	13–10	Marcio Navarro	Decision (split)	Bellator 56	October 29, 2011	3	5:00	Kansas City, Kansas, United States	
Loss	13–9	A.J. Matthews	Decision (unanimous)	Bellator 53	October 8, 2011	3	5:00	Miami, Oklahoma, United States	Catchweight (175 lbs) bout.
Loss	13–8	Forrest Petz	TKO (punches)	C3 Fights: Great Plains Sizzling Slamfest	July 30, 2011	1	2:55	Newkirk, Oklahoma, United States	
Win	13–7	Darryl Cobb	Submission (rear-naked choke)	Titan FC 18	May 27, 2011	1	3:30	Kansas City, Kansas, United States	Middleweight bout.
Loss	12–7	Jason High	Technical Submission (guillotine choke)	Titan FC 16	January 29, 2011	1	0:51	Kansas City, Kansas, United States	
Win	12–6	Chad Reiner	KO (punch)	Bellator 32	October 14, 2010	1	1:29	Kansas City, Missouri, United States	Catchweight (180 lbs) bout.
Loss	11–6	Zak Cummings	Submission (D'arce choke)	Bellator 26	August 26, 2010	1	1:27	Kansas City, Missouri, United States	Middleweight bout.
Win	11–5	Brian Green	Submission (rear-naked choke)	Bellator 22	June 17, 2010	1	3:29	Kansas City, Missouri, United States	Catchweight (180 lbs) bout.
Loss	10–5	Brent Weedman	KO (punches)	Bellator 16	April 29, 2010	1	4:19	Kansas City, Missouri, United States	Catchweight (173 lbs) bout.
Loss	10–4	Tyron Woodley	Submission (arm-triangle choke)	Strikeforce Challengers: Woodley vs. Bears	November 20, 2009	1	2:52	Kansas City, Kansas, United States	Welterweight debut
Win	10–3	Brendan Seguin	TKO (punches)	M-1 Global: Breakthrough	August 28, 2009	2	1:01	Kansas City, Missouri, United States	Catchweight (175 lbs) bout.
Win	9–3	Ted Worthington	Decision (unanimous)	Extreme Fight Production	June 12, 2009	3	5:00	Kansas City, Missouri, United States	
Win	8–3	Charles Jones	TKO (punches)	C3 Fights	February 28, 2009	2	2:47	Newkirk, Oklahoma, United States	
Win	7–3	Dominic Brown	TKO (punches)	Titan FC 12	December 19, 2008	2	1:39	Kansas City, Missouri, United States	
Win	6–3	Chris Easter	KO (punch)	Havic Prizefighting: Downtown Throwdown 2	November 22, 2008	1	2:18	Wichita, Kansas, United States	
Win	5–3	Jake Short	Decision (split)	C3 Fights: Showdown 2	August 16, 2008	3	5:00	Cherokee, North Carolina, United States	
Loss	4–3	Joey Gorczynski	Submission (guillotine choke)	Freestyle Cage Fighting 21	July 26, 2008	1	0:54	Tulsa, Oklahoma, United States	
Win	4–2	Tom Jones	Submission (rear-naked choke)	Freestyle Cage Fighting 20	June 14, 2008	1	1:33	Shawnee, Oklahoma, United States	
Win	3–2	Nate James	Submission (rear naked choke)	CCCF: Battle on the Border	March 29, 2008	1	0:39	Newkirk, Oklahoma, United States	
Loss	2–2	Zak Cummings	Submission (choke)	FM: Productions	February 1, 2008	3	2:08	Rolla, Missouri, United States	
Win	2–1	Ruben Escamilla	Submission (triangle choke)	CCCF: Contenders	January 19, 2008	2	1:21	Oklahoma City, Oklahoma, United States	
Loss	1–1	Leonardo Pecanha	Submission (armbar)	Titan FC 9	September 22, 2007	1	0:38	Kansas City, Kansas, United States	
Win	1–0	Isaac Vallie-Flagg	Submission (rear-naked choke)	FW 15: Rumble at Rt. 66 Casino	July 28, 2007	1	4:00	Albuquerque, New Mexico, United States	
