= Marcio Navarro =

Brazilian kickboxer and mixed martial artist

- Born: Márcio Navarro; September 17, 1978 (age 48); Indaiatuba, São Paulo, Brazil
- Other names: Locomotive
- Height: 6 ft 0 in (1.83 m)
- Weight: 155 lb (70 kg; 11.1 st)
- Division: Welterweight; Lightweight
- Style: Kickboxing, Brazilian Jiu-Jitsu
- Stance: Orthodox
- Fighting out of: Wichita, Kansas, United States
- Team: LaSalva MMA (2008–2014); Valor Martial Arts (2014–2018)
- Rank: Black belt in Brazilian Jiu-Jitsu
- Years active: 1992–2018 (Kickboxing); 2008–2018 (MMA)

Kickboxing record
- Total: 44
- Wins: 40
- Losses: 4

Mixed martial arts record
- Total: 29
- Wins: 15
- By knockout: 4
- By submission: 5
- By decision: 6
- Losses: 14
- By knockout: 5
- By submission: 3
- By decision: 6

Other information
- Mixed martial arts record from Sherdog
- Military career
- Allegiance: United States
- Branch: United States Air Force Reserve
- Service years: 2017–present

Márcio Navarro (pronounced /nəˈvɑːhoʊ/ nə-VAH-hoh; born September 17, 1978) is a retired Brazilian professional mixed martial artist and professional kickboxer. He is the former International Sport Karate Association (ISKA) light middleweight oriental rules world champion. Navarro also is an instructor at Valor Martial Arts in Wichita, Kansas.

== Kickboxing career ==
Navarro began training in kickboxing in 1992. He won the vacant ISKA light middleweight oriental rules world championship belt on September 21, 2012, defeating Thomas Longacre by split decision (49-48, 48-49 and 49–48). He was later stripped of the title because he was not defending it since he began to focus on his mixed martial arts career instead. He retired on July 21, 2018, after a winning a fight by knockout via a head kick.

== MMA career ==
Navarro began his MMA career in 2008 with TKO victory over Sandro Vieira da Silva in his hometown of Indaiatuba, Brazil. Shortly after the fight, he moved to the United States. Navarro fought his first fight in the United States on November 9, 2008, against Adam Sohayda in Orange County, California. He won the fight by TKO in the 2nd round. On October 29, 2011, fought Rudy Bears on Bellator LVI in the Local Feature Fights. Navarro defeated Bears by split decision. Navarro has fought 29 fights in his career, winning 15. He fought Donnie Bell at Bellator CIII and lost via submission by rear neck crank. Navarro fought in his third Bellator fight at Bellator CXIII against Bobby Cooper and lost the fight via unanimous decision, extending his losing streak to four fights. Navarro broke his losing streak with a 1st-round knockout of local fighter Demian Papagni. He fought his fourth Bellator fight at Bellator 130 against Cody Carrillo. Carillo gave a verbal submission from multiple punches.

=== Mixed martial arts record ===
Professional record breakdown
28 matches	14 wins	14 losses
By knockout	4	5
By submission	5	3
By decision	5	6

Res.	Record	Opponent	Method	Event	Date	Round	Time	Location	Notes
Loss	15–14	Henry Lindsay	TKO (punches)	Bellator 150	February 26, 2016	1	2:30	Mulvane, Kansas, United States	
Loss	15–13	Brian Foster	KO	XFI 14	July 18, 2015	1	0:45	Fort Smith, Arkansas, United States	
Loss	15–12	Codale Ford	Decision (unanimous)	Rage on the River 03/20/15	March 20, 2015	3	5:00	Tulsa, Oklahoma, United States	Welterweight bout; for the XFN Welterweight Championship.
Win	15–11	Kyle Sjafiroudden	Submission (rear-naked choke)	OFC 3	November 22, 2014	2	2:29	Concho, Oklahoma, United States	Won the OFC Lightweight Championship
Win	14–11	Cody Carrillo	Submission (punches)	Bellator 130	October 24, 2014	3	2:09	Mulvane, Kansas, United States	
Win	13–11	Demian Papagni	KO (head kick)	Friday Night Fights	April 18, 2014	1	2:37	Wichita, Kansas, United States	Knockout of the Night.
Loss	12–11	Bobby Cooper	Decision (unanimous)	Bellator CXIII	March 21, 2014	3	5:00	Mulvane, Kansas, United States	Catchweight (158 lb) bout.
Loss	12–10	Donnie Bell	Submission (rear neck crank)	Bellator CIII	October 11, 2013	1	2:06	Mulvane, Kansas, United States	
Loss	11–9	Jake Lindsey	KO (punch)	VFC Fight Night: Wichita 1	April 27, 2013	1	2:12	Wichita, Kansas, United States	For the VFC Lightweight Championship.
Loss	11–8	Jon Carson	Decision (unanimous)	Xtreme Fight Night	April 12, 2013	5	5:00	Tulsa, Oklahoma, United States	For the XFL Lightweight Championship.
Win	11–7	Mike Osborn	Submission (rear-naked choke)	Battle at Beech	March 2, 2013	1	3:11	Wichita, Kansas, United States	Lightweight debut.
Win	10–7	Brian Grinnell	TKO (punches)	Seasons Beatings	December 1, 2012	2	1:53	Wichita, Kansas, United States	Knockout of the Night.
Win	9–7	Rudy Bears	Decision (split)	Bellator LVI	October 29, 2011	3	5:00	Kansas City, Kansas, United States	
Loss	8–7	Thomas Schulte	TKO (punches)	KOTC: Apocalypse	September 17, 2011	1	1:30	Thackerville, Oklahoma, United States	
Loss	8–6	Nick Nolte	Decision (unanimous)	Titan Fighting Championship 19	July 29, 2011	3	5:00	Kansas City, Kansas, United States	
Win	8–5	Salvador Woods	Decision (split)	Wright Fights 2	March 11, 2011	3	5:00	St. Charles, Missouri, United States	
Loss	7–5	Dylan Smith	Submission	XFL – Rumble on the River 2	December 10, 2010	1	1:01	Tulsa, Oklahoma, United States	
Win	7–4	Rico Cato	Submission	Rock It Hard	October 7, 2010	2	0:55	Oklahoma City, Oklahoma, United States	
Win	6–4	Dylan Smith	Decision (split)	XFL – Rumble on the River 1	July 30, 2010	3	5:00	Tulsa, Oklahoma, United States	
Loss	5–4	Charles Jones	Decision (unanimous)	Bricktown Brawl 4	April 10, 2010	3	5:00	Oklahoma City, Oklahoma, United States	
Win	5–3	Aaron Hedrick	Decision (split)	Red Dragon Promotions – Enter the Septagon	February 27, 2010	3	5:00	Oklahoma City, Oklahoma, United States	
Loss	4–3	Levi Avera	Submission (armbar)	XFL – Final Fury	November 27, 2009	1	1:13	Bixby, Oklahoma, United States	
Win	4–2	Jake Fox	Submission (rear-naked choke)	NLCF – Midwest Maddness	September 25, 2009	2	1:08	Wichita, Kansas, United States	
Loss	3–2	Tim Means	TKO (punches)	KOTC: Gunslinger	August 8, 2009	1	3:53	Concho, Oklahoma, United States	
Loss	3–1	Joe Heiland	Decision (unanimous)	Slammin Jammin Weekend 3	May 9, 2009	3	3:00	Newkirk, Oklahoma, United States	
Win	3–0	Herman Terrado	Decision (unanimous)	Slammin Jammin Weekend 2	March 28, 2009	3	5:00	Newkirk, Oklahoma, United States	
Win	2–0	Adam Sohayda	TKO (punches)	Fist Series: OctoberFist 2008	November 9, 2008	2	1:08	Orange County, California, United States	
Win	1–0	Sandro Vieira da Silva	TKO (punches)	IFC – Vale Tudo	July 19, 2008	1	3:30	Indaiatuba, Brazil	

== Personal ==
Navarro is married with four children.

He teaches kickboxing, MMA, Capoeira, Brazilian Jiu-Jitsu, and fitness classes at Valor Martial Arts in Wichita, Kansas.

He joined the United States Air Force Reserves in 2017 shortly after becoming a United States citizen.
