= Brent Weedman =

American mixed martial arts fighter

- Born: February 10, 1984 (age 42); Louisville, Kentucky, U.S.
- Height: 6 ft 0 in (1.83 m)
- Weight: 170 lb (77 kg; 12 st)
- Division: Welterweight; Lightweight
- Fighting out of: Louisville, Kentucky, United States
- Team: Team Haycraft; Derby City MMA
- Rank: Black belt in Brazilian Jiu-Jitsu
- Years active: 2005–2013

Mixed martial arts record
- Total: 32
- Wins: 22
- By knockout: 10
- By submission: 9
- By decision: 3
- Losses: 9
- By knockout: 1
- By submission: 1
- By decision: 7
- Draws: 1

Other information
- Mixed martial arts record from Sherdog

Brent Weedman (born February 10, 1984) is an American retired mixed martial artist who has competed in Bellator's Welterweight division. He has competed in several Bellator Tournaments, including the: Bellator Season Four Welterweight Tournament, Bellator Season 5 Welterweight Tournament, and the Bellator Season 6 Lightweight Tournament. He is married to fellow Brazilian jiu-jitsu player, Emily Weedman.

== Background ==
Weedman is from Louisville, Kentucky, and began his formal training in the martial arts when he was four years old. Weedman's father, who was a police officer and a longtime martial artist himself, also ran a martial arts school. In addition to full-contact karate, Weedman began competitive judo when he was eight years old and also played football and soccer.

== Mixed martial arts career ==
=== Early career ===
Weedman's professional career began in 2005. Making his debut in the HOOKnSHOOT promotion, Weedman finished his first fight with a draw after two rounds. Weedman later racked up two successive victories in the promotion before meeting future UFC veteran Gray Maynard. Weedman lost via unanimous decision, which gave Maynard his entry onto The Ultimate Fighter 5.

After a further win via TKO, Weedman was ranked as the number one 183 lb fighter in the Shooto rankings, despite him never competing in the Shooto organisation. Amongst his next fights were losses to Dan Hornbuckle via triangle choke and Anthony Lapsley via TKO due to a cut over his right eye.

In May 2008, with his record at 8–5–1, Weedman faced Douglas Lima for the AFL welterweight title. Weedman was reportedly brought in to the fight to showcase Lima's skills, as Weedman was expected to be an easy fight. Weedman threatened early on with a triangle choke which was unsuccessful. Late in the second round, Weedman again caught Lima in a triangle choke, but transitioned to an armbar, which forced Lima to submit, giving Weedman the title. He would go on to say "They brought me in because Douglas Lima would make a great champ for them. Now, it's my turn to step up. I feel good about the fact that I did a one-fight deal with them. We're going to talk a multi-fight contract now." Weedman was scheduled to defend the belt at AFL's first ever pay-per-view, though the bout failed to transpire and Weedman never fought for the promotion again.

=== Bellator Fighting Championships ===
Following five successive wins after his AFL title win, Weedman made his Bellator Fighting Championship debut at Bellator 16 against Rudy Bears. Weedman defeated Bears via KO at 4:19 of the opening round.

Weedman returned at Bellator 23, where he faced John Troyer. Weedman made quick work of Troyer, finishing him via armbar just before the end of the opening round.

At Bellator 30, Weedman faced Jacob McClintock, a former Bellator Welterweight Tournament competitor. The winner would reportedly receive a slot in Bellator's fourth season welterweight tournament. After just three minutes, Weedman was able to win the fight via TKO due to punches.

With the win, Weedman officially qualified for the Bellator Season Four Welterweight tournament, alongside the likes of Jim Wallhead, Rick Hawn and Dan Hornbuckle. Weedman fought Hornbuckle in the first round of the tournament, winning the fight by unanimous decision. However, due to the facial laceration he received during the fight, Weedman has been suspended 60 days, putting his position in the tournament in doubt. In his next fight Weedman fought Jay Hieron for a spot in the finals at Bellator 40 and lost a controversial unanimous decision (29–28, 29–28, 29–28).

Weedman entered into the Bellator Season 5 Welterweight Tournament. He fought Chris Lozano in the opening round held at Bellator 49 and lost the fight via unanimous decision.

After Weedman realized he was a very small Welterweight, he decided to drop to the lightweight division. He was granted instant entry to the Bellator Season 6 Lightweight Tournament. In the quarter-finals of the tournament, Weedman fought J.J. Ambrose at Bellator 62 on March 23, 2012. Weedman won the fight via submission (VonFflue choke) in the second round.

In the semi-final round Weedman fought Thiago Michel at Bellator 66. He won the fight via split decision. Weedman then faced Rick Hawn in the finals on May 25, 2012, at Bellator 70 in New Orleans, Louisiana. He lost the fight via unanimous decision.

In the opening round of Bellator Season 8 Welterweight Tournament Weedman faced off against Marius Zaromskis at Bellator 86. He won via unanimous decision. Weedman was supposed to face Douglas Lima in the semi-finals at Bellator 90. Weedman would be forced to withdraw from the fight due to injury. He was then replaced by Bryan Baker.

Weedman returned for the Season 9 Welterweight Tournament. He faced Justin Baesman in the quarterfinal opening round at Bellator 100 and won via first-round submission.

In the semifinals, he had a rematch with Rick Hawn and lost via unanimous decision.

Weedman has retired from MMA.

== Skepticism ==
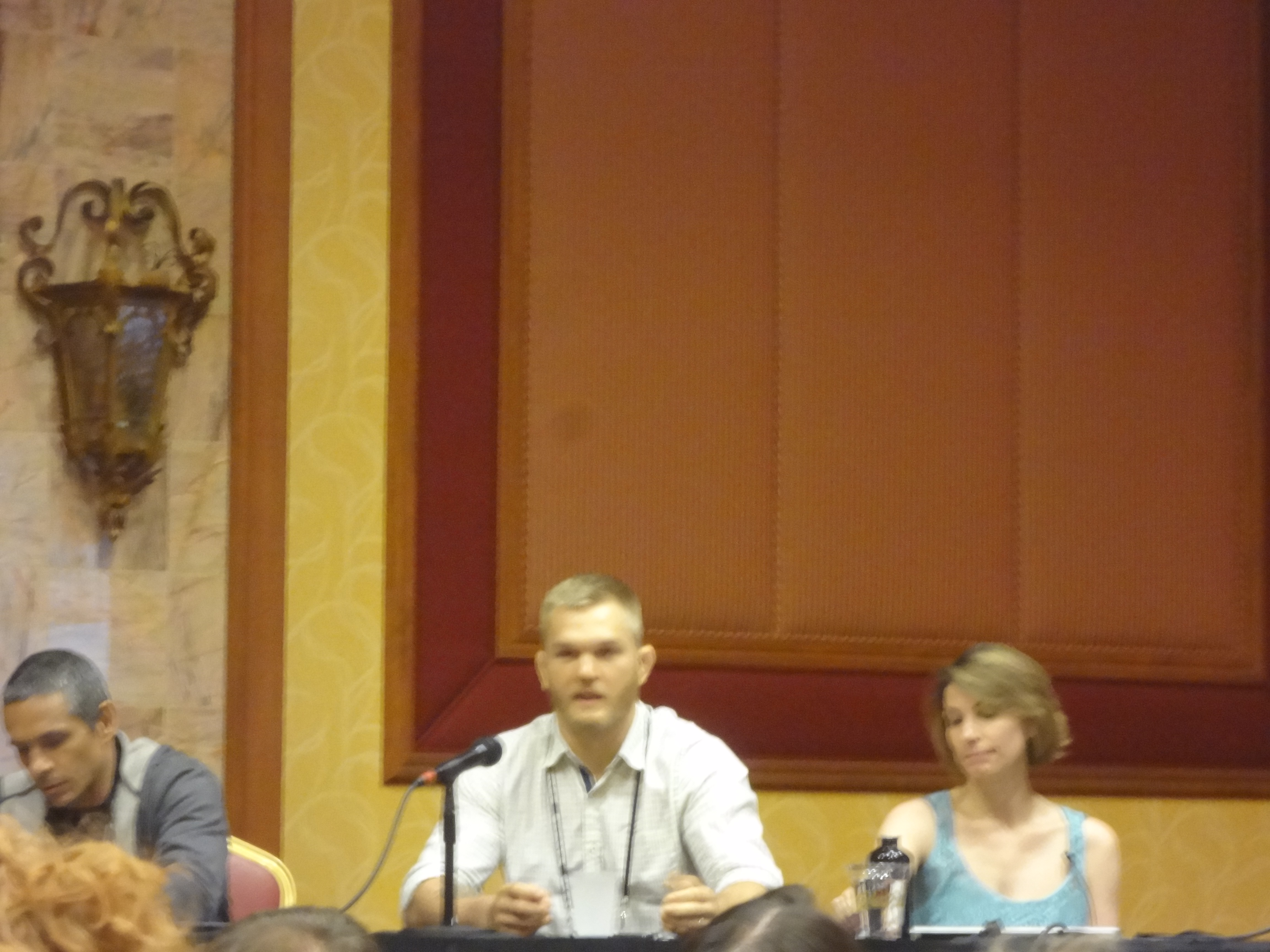
Brent Weedman (center) at The Amaz!ing Meeting 2013 with Sifu Zeigler (left) and Jennifer Ouellette (right)

Weedman approached the James Randi Educational Foundation (JREF) expressing interest in representing the organization. In an interview with foundation president D.J. Grothe, Weedman discussed his interest in scientific skepticism. Weedman states, "The work that James Randi and the JREF do is very important, and I'm proud to be involved with you guys. I feel strongly about the cause." He cites James Randi, Carl Sagan, Neil DeGrasse Tyson, and Phil Plait as inspirations.

Weedman presented at The Amaz!ng Meeting 2013 where he discussed pseudoscience in the martial arts.

== Championships and accomplishments ==
=== Mixed martial arts ===
- Bellator Fighting Championships
  - Bellator Season 6 Lightweight Tournament Runner-Up

== Mixed martial arts record ==
Professional record breakdown
32 matches	22 wins	9 losses
By knockout	10	1
By submission	9	1
By decision	3	7
Draws	1	

Res.	Record	Opponent	Method	Event	Date	Round	Time	Location	Notes
Loss	22–9–1	Rick Hawn	Decision (unanimous)	Bellator 104	October 18, 2013	3	5:00	Cedar Rapids, Iowa, United States	Bellator Season 9 Welterweight Tournament Semifinal
Win	22–8–1	Justin Baesman	Submission (armbar)	Bellator 100	September 20, 2013	1	3:20	Phoenix, Arizona, United States	Bellator Season 9 Welterweight Tournament Quarterfinal
Win	21–8–1	Marius Zaromskis	Decision (unanimous)	Bellator 86	January 24, 2013	3	5:00	Thackerville, Oklahoma, United States	Bellator Season 8 Welterweight Tournament Quarterfinal
Loss	20–8–1	Rick Hawn	Decision (unanimous)	Bellator 70	May 25, 2012	3	5:00	New Orleans, Louisiana, United States	Bellator Season 6 Lightweight Tournament Final
Win	20–7–1	Thiago Michel	Decision (split)	Bellator 66	April 20, 2012	3	5:00	Cleveland, Ohio, United States	Bellator Season 6 Lightweight Tournament Semifinal
Win	19–7–1	J.J. Ambrose	Submission (Von Flue choke)	Bellator 62	March 23, 2012	2	3:26	Laredo, Texas, United States	Bellator Season 6 Lightweight Tournament Quarterfinal
Loss	18–7–1	Chris Lozano	Decision (unanimous)	Bellator 49	September 10, 2011	3	5:00	Atlantic City, New Jersey, United States	Bellator Season 5 Welterweight Tournament Quarterfinal
Loss	18–6–1	Jay Hieron	Decision (unanimous)	Bellator 40	April 9, 2011	3	5:00	Newkirk, Oklahoma, United States	Welterweight Tournament Semifinal
Win	18–5–1	Dan Hornbuckle	Decision (unanimous)	Bellator 35	March 5, 2011	3	5:00	Lemoore, California, United States	Welterweight Tournament Quarterfinal
Win	17–5–1	Jacob McClintock	TKO (knee to the body & punches)	Bellator 30	September 23, 2010	1	3:05	Louisville, Kentucky, United States	Qualified for the Bellator Season Four tournament
Win	16–5–1	John Troyer	Submission (armbar)	Bellator 23	June 24, 2010	1	4:55	Louisville, Kentucky, United States	
Win	15–5–1	Rudy Bears	KO (punches)	Bellator 16	April 29, 2010	1	4:19	Kansas City, Missouri, United States	
Win	14–5–1	Akbarh Arreola	TKO (punches)	MMA Xtreme 23	August 15, 2009	2	0:42	Cancun, Mexico	
Win	13–5–1	Robert Thompson	Submission (rear-naked choke)	EFA: Rebels Without a Cause	March 19, 2009	1	2:34	Monroe, Louisiana, United States	
Win	12–5–1	John Mckean	TKO (punches)	EFA: Rebels Without a Cause	March 19, 2009	1	2:48	Monroe, Louisiana, United States	
Win	11–5–1	Tim Stout	TKO (punches)	Bullet Fight Gear: Last Man Standing	February 21, 2009	1	4:03	Kennesaw, Georgia, United States	
Win	10–5–1	David Gaston	Submission (rear-naked choke)	UFL: Fight Night at The Murat	December 13, 2008	2	2:49	Indianapolis, Indiana, United States	
Win	9–5–1	Douglas Lima	Submission (armbar)	AFL: Bulletproof	May 30, 2008	2	4:39	Atlanta, Georgia, United States	Won the AFL Welterweight Championship
Loss	8–5–1	Rhomez Brower	Decision (split)	Bullet Fight Gear: Showdown	March 14, 2008	3	5:00	Kennesaw, Georgia, United States	
Win	8–4–1	Matt Shaw	Submission (punches)	Wild Bill's: Fight Night 12	November 2, 2007	1	0:39	Atlanta, Georgia, United States	
Loss	7–4–1	Anthony Lapsley	TKO (cut)	UFL: Fight Night at Conseco Fieldhouse	August 11, 2007	1	3:24	Indianapolis, Indiana, United States	
Win	7–3–1	Jake Short	TKO (corner stoppage)	Wild Bill's: Fight Night 9	June 8, 2007	1	4:28	Atlanta, Georgia, United States	
Win	6–3–1	David Hulett	Submission	Wild Bill's: Fight Night 8	April 13, 2007	1	2:41	Atlanta, Georgia, United States	
Win	5–3–1	Chris Connelly	TKO (punches)	Wild Bill's: Fight Night 8	April 13, 2007	1	0:52	Atlanta, Georgia, United States	
Loss	4–3–1	Jake Short	Decision (majority)	Wild Bill's: Fight Night 7	March 2, 2007	3	5:00	Atlanta, Georgia, United States	
Win	4–2–1	Hans Marrero	TKO (punches)	Wild Bill's: Fight Night 7	March 2, 2007	1	1:29	Atlanta, Georgia, United States	
Loss	3–2–1	Dan Hornbuckle	Submission (triangle choke)	LOF 12: Black Tie Battles	December 31, 2006	2	3:31	Indianapolis, Indiana, United States	
Win	3–1–1	Lucas Gwaltney	TKO (corner stoppage)	Legends of Fighting 8	July 28, 2006	3	1:45	Indianapolis, Indiana, United States	
Loss	2–1–1	Gray Maynard	Decision (unanimous)	WEF: Orleans Arena	June 10, 2006	3	5:00	Paradise, Nevada, United States	
Win	2–0–1	Josh Cate	KO (punch)	HOOKnSHOOT: Live	May 20, 2006	1	N/A	Evansville, Indiana, United States	
Win	1–0–1	Anthony Stevens	Submission	HOOKnSHOOT: Grand Prix	March 25, 2006	N/A	N/A	Evansville, Indiana, United States	
Draw	0–0–1	Scott Henze	Draw	HOOKnSHOOT: The Final Showdown	September 10, 2005	2	5:00	Evansville, Indiana, United States	
