= Chris Lozano =

American mixed martial arts fighter

- Born: September 14, 1982 (age 44); Cleveland, Ohio, United States
- Other names: The Cleveland Assassin
- Height: 6 ft 1 in (1.85 m)
- Weight: 170 lb (77 kg; 12 st)
- Division: Middleweight; Welterweight
- Reach: 75.5 in (192 cm)
- Fighting out of: Cleveland, Ohio, United States
- Team: Evolve MMA; Strong Style Fight Team
- Rank: NCAA Division I Wrestling; Red belt in Taekwondo; Blue belt in Brazilian Jiu-Jitsu
- Years active: 2008-2016; 2019

Professional boxing record
- Total: 1
- Wins: 0
- Losses: 1
- Draws: 0

Mixed martial arts record
- Total: 15
- Wins: 10
- By knockout: 8
- By submission: 1
- By decision: 1
- Losses: 5
- By knockout: 2
- By submission: 1
- By decision: 2

Other information
- Mixed martial arts record from Sherdog

Chris Lozano (born September 14, 1982) is an American professional mixed martial arts (MMA) fighter. A professional since 2008, he has fought for Bellator, and was a competitor on Fight Master: Bellator MMA.

== Background ==
Lozano began wrestling when he was in the fifth grade. Aside from wrestling, he holds a red belt in taekwondo, which he earned when he was only 17. He also has a blue belt in Brazilian Jiu-Jitsu. He has a small boxing background, owning a 0-1 pro boxing record.

== Mixed martial arts career ==
=== North American Allied Fight Series ===
Lozano began his mixed martial arts career fighting in NAAFS. He is undefeated under the organization with 5 knockouts. After suffering the first loss of his career to Lyman Good at Bellator 35, he bounced back with a first-round KO victory over Gerric Hayes at NAAFS: Caged Vengeance 9.

=== Bellator Fighting Championships ===
In his Bellator debut, Lozano fought UFC veteran Yoshiyuki Yoshida at Bellator 31 and defeated him by TKO (corner stoppage) to give him a spot in the Bellator Season Four Welterweight Tournament. He fought former Bellator Welterweight Champion Lyman Good in the first round of the Bellator Season Four Welterweight Tournament. He lost the fight via unanimous decision.

in 2011, Lozano entered into the Bellator Season Five Welterweight Tournament. He fought Brent Weedman in the opening round held at Bellator 49 and won the fight via unanimous decision. In the semifinal round he lost via KO to Douglas Lima, the eventual winner of the tournament.

In 2012, Lozano was featured in the Bellator Season Six Welterweight Tournament. He faced Karl Amoussou in the opening round of the tournament at Bellator 63 and lost via submission in the first round. Lozano was released from his contract after suffering back-to-back losses in Bellator.

=== Independent promotions ===
Lozano made his post Bellator debut on June 2, 2012, for North American Allied Fight Series in his hometown of Cleveland, Ohio. Lozano fought James Warfield, an experienced journeyman, in the co-main event of Fight Night in the Flats 8. Lozano won the fight after Warfield could not answer for the second round.

=== Fight Master: Bellator MMA ===
On May 6, 2013, it was announced that Lozano would be featured as a participant on Bellator Fighting Championships reality TV show Fight Master: Bellator MMA.

In his preliminary fight to get on the show, Lozano defeated Josh Quayhagen by unanimous decision. During the team selection, Lozano chose Frank Shamrock to be his coach. In his second fight, he defeated Bryan Travers by split decision in a sudden victory round. In the quarterfinals, he faced Mike Bronzoulis and lost via unanimous decision.

== Mixed martial arts record ==
Professional record breakdown
15 matches	10 wins	5 losses
By knockout	8	2
By submission	1	1
By decision	1	2

Res.	Record	Opponent	Method	Event	Date	Round	Time	Location	Notes
Loss	10–5	Vincius De Jesus	TKO (knees)	CES 58: De Jesus vs. Lozano	September 7, 2019	3	3:22	Hartford, Connecticut, United States	For the CES Welterweight Championship.
Loss	10–4	Eddie Gordon	Decision (split)	Cage Fury Fighting Championships 60	August 6, 2016	3	5:00	Atlantic City, New Jersey, United States	Middleweight bout.
Win	10–3	James Warfield	TKO (retirement)	NAAFS: Fight Night in the Flats 8	June 2, 2012	1	5:00	Cleveland, Ohio, United States	
Loss	9–3	Karl Amoussou	Submission (rear-naked choke)	Bellator 63	March 30, 2012	1	2:05	Uncasville, Connecticut, United States	Bellator Season Six Welterweight Tournament Quarterfinal.
Loss	9–2	Douglas Lima	KO (punch)	Bellator 53	October 8, 2011	2	3:14	Miami, Oklahoma, United States	Bellator Season Five Welterweight Tournament Semifinal.
Win	9–1	Brent Weedman	Decision (unanimous)	Bellator 49	September 10, 2011	3	5:00	Atlantic City, New Jersey, United States	Bellator Season Five Welterweight Tournament Quarterfinal.
Win	8–1	Derek Smith	Submission (rear-naked choke)	NAAFS: Fight Night in the Flats 7	June 4, 2011	1	2:20	Cleveland, Ohio, United States	
Win	7–1	Gerric Hayes	KO (punch and head kick)	NAAFS: Caged Vengeance 9	April 16, 2011	1	4:59	Canton, Ohio, United States	
Loss	6–1	Lyman Good	Decision (unanimous)	Bellator 35	March 5, 2011	3	5:00	Lemoore, California, United States	Bellator Season Four Welterweight Tournament Quarterfinal.
Win	6–0	Yoshiyuki Yoshida	TKO (corner stoppage)	Bellator 31	September 30, 2010	2	5:00	Lake Charles, Louisiana, United States	
Win	5–0	Jason Dent	TKO (retirement)	NAAFS: Fight Night in the Flats 6	June 5, 2010	4	5:00	Cleveland, Ohio, United States	Welterweight debut.
Win	4–0	Brandon Gaines	KO (punch)	Freestyle Cage Fighting 40	March 27, 2010	1	3:56	Shawnee, Oklahoma, United States	
Win	3–0	Allan Weickert	KO (punch)	NAAFS: Night of Champions	December 5, 2009	1	4:55	Akron, Ohio, United States	
Win	2–0	John Fields	KO (punch)	NAAFS: Rock N Rumble 3	August 29, 2009	1	0:47	Cleveland, Ohio, United States	
Win	1–0	Marcus Kuck	KO (punches)	NAAFS: Fight Night in the Flats 5	June 6, 2009	1	0:37	Cleveland, Ohio, United States	
