= Ron Sparks (fighter) =

American mixed martial arts fighter

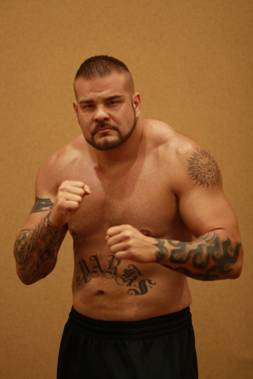
- Ron Sparks in 2013
- Born: November 23, 1974; Louisville, Kentucky, United States
- Died: July 15, 2023 (aged 48); Louisville, KY
- Other names: The Monster
- Nationality: American
- Height: 6 ft 4 in (1.93 m)
- Weight: 119.7 kg (264 lb; 18.85 st)
- Division: Heavyweight
- Reach: 74.
- Style: Kickboxing Karate BJJ
- Team: Louisville MMA
- Teachers: Terry Middleton and Jeff Embry
- Trainer: Jason Y
- Rank: 1st Dan Black Belt in Karate Black Belt in Brazilian Jiu-Jitsu under Gracie Barra
- Years active: 2000-present

Kickboxing record
- Total: 21
- Wins: 18
- By knockout: 15
- Losses: 1
- By knockout: 1
- Draws: 2

Mixed martial arts record
- Total: 27
- Wins: 24
- By knockout: 22
- By submission: 1
- By decision: 1
- Losses: 3
- By knockout: 2
- By submission: 1

Other information
- Occupation: Owner, A-Ron Construction, Louisville KY
- Mixed martial arts record from Sherdog
- Last updated on: June 11th 2016

Ron Sparks (born November 23, 1974) was an American mixed martial artist, who formerly competed in Bellator's Strikeforce K-1 King of the cage Revolution fight league American fight league Heavyweight division.

== Background ==
Born and raised in Louisville, Kentucky, Sparks was introduced to combat sports through his father, a Vietnam War veteran who also worked as a martial arts instructor in the military. Sparks himself began training when he was seven years old, before transitioning into kickboxing when he was a teenager and became a sparring partner for various local boxers and kickboxers. Sparks then embarked on his own career in kickboxing, before finally switching over to MMA. Sparks was also owner of a general contracting company, A-Ron Construction, based in Louisville, Kentucky; servicing all aspects of home improvement needs.

== Early career ==
Sparks made his professional MMA debut on June 17, 2006, defeating Heath Zimmerman via KO at Caged Inferno 2. Following this impressive win, Sparks would compile an undefeated record of 5–0 before being signed by Bellator MMA in June 2010.

=== Bellator MMA ===
Sparks made his Bellator debut in his hometown of Louisville, Kentucky, at Bellator 30, which he won by knockout after just 50 seconds. He then fought veteran Vince Lucero at Bellator 43 on May 7, 2011, which he won via first-round submission.

Sparks entered into the Bellator Season Five Heavyweight Tournament. In the opening round, he faced Mark Holata at Bellator 52 and won via knockout in the first round. Sparks then faced Eric Prindle in the semifinals and lost via knockout in the first round.

Sparks will compete in the Bellator Season Seven Heavyweight Tournament, and was expected to face Mark Godbeer in the quarterfinals at Bellator 75.

Sparks faced Vitaly Minakov on June 19, 2013, at Bellator 96 in the opening round of the Heavyweight Tournament. He lost the fight via TKO in the first round.

Sparks made his next appearance for Bellator at Bellator 105 on October 25, 2013, facing fellow kickboxer Mighty Mo. Sparks lost via submission in the first round.

Sparks was released from Bellator on August 25, 2014.

=== Other promotions ===
Sparks was expected to face Josh Walker at Hardrock MMA 60 on February 1, 2014. However, in the weeks leading up to the event, the fight was taken off of the card for unknown reasons. Sparks was expected to face Jeremy May on September 20, 2014, at Square Ring Promotions: Island Fights 30. However, the fight was cancelled for unknown reasons.

== Mixed martial arts record ==
Professional record breakdown
11 matches	8 wins	3 losses
By knockout	6	2
By submission	1	1
By decision	1	0

Res.	Record	Opponent	Method	Event	Date	Round	Time	Location	Notes
Loss	8–3	Mighty Mo	Submission (Keylock)	Bellator 105	October 25, 2013	1	2:52	Rio Rancho, New Mexico, United States	
Loss	8–2	Vitaly Minakov	TKO (punches)	Bellator 96	June 19, 2013	1	0:32	Thackerville, Oklahoma, United States	Bellator Summer Series 2013 Heavyweight Tournament Semifinal
Loss	8–1	Eric Prindle	KO (punch)	Bellator 56	October 29, 2011	1	0:40	Kansas City, Kansas, United States	Bellator Season Five Heavyweight Tournament Semifinal
Win	8–0	Mark Holata	KO (punches)	Bellator 52	October 1, 2011	1	1:24	Lake Charles, Louisiana, United States	Bellator Season Five Heavyweight Tournament Quarterfinal
Win	7–0	Vince Lucero	Submission (Keylock)	Bellator 43	May 7, 2011	1	2:18	Newkirk, Oklahoma, United States	
Win	6–0	Gregory Maynard	KO (punch)	Bellator 30	September 23, 2010	1	0:50	Louisville, Kentucky, United States	
Win	5–0	Johnathan Ivey	Decision (unanimous)	RFL: Maximum Impact	June 27, 2009	4	5.00	Hammond, Indiana, United States	
Win	4–0	Geoffrey Meisner	TKO (punches)	Colosseo Championship Fighting	March 6, 2009	1	1:07	Edmonton, Alberta, Canada	
Win	3–0	TC Shane	KO (punches)	Caged Inferno 3	September 30, 2006	1	0:36	Louisville, Kentucky, United States	
Win	2–0	Aaron Schenk	TKO (punches)	Clash in the Cage 1	July 29, 2006	1	0:24	Lawrenceburg, Kentucky, United States	
Win	1–0	Heath Zimmerman	KO (punches)	Caged Inferno 2	June 17, 2006	1	0:17	Louisville, Kentucky, United States	

== Kickboxing record ==
0 wins, 1 loss
Result	Record	Opponent	Method	Event	Date	Round	Time	Location	Notes
Loss	0-1	(Belarus) Alexey Ignashov	KO (right high kick)	K-1 ColliZion 2009 Final Elimination	October 24, 2009	2	2:15	Arad, Romania

Legend: Win Loss Draw/No contest
