= Douglas Lima =

Brazilian mixed martial artist

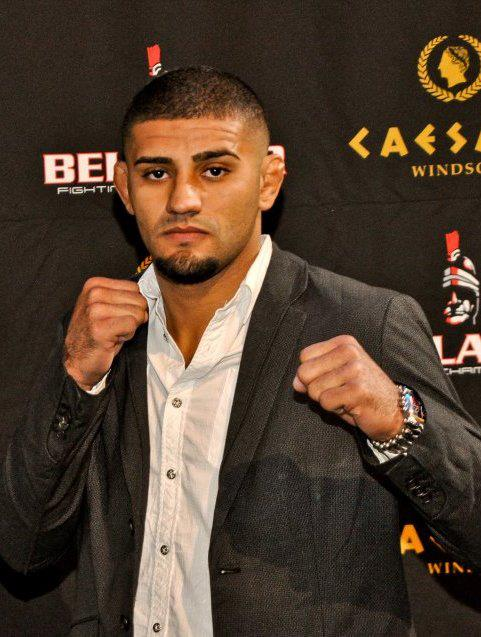
- Born: Douglas Lima; 5 January 1988 (age 38); Goiânia, Goiás, Brazil
- Other names: The Phenom
- Height: 6 ft 1 in (1.85 m)
- Weight: 185 lb (84 kg; 13.2 st)
- Division: Welterweight (2006–present); Middleweight (2020, 2023–present)
- Reach: 74 1/2 in (189 cm)
- Style: Muay Thai
- Stance: Orthodox
- Fighting out of: Atlanta, Georgia, U.S.
- Team: American Top Team Atlanta (until 2020); American Top Team Gwinnett (2020–present)
- Rank: Black belt in Brazilian Jiu-Jitsu under Roan Carneiro
- Years active: 2006–present

Mixed martial arts record
- Total: 45
- Wins: 33
- By knockout: 16
- By submission: 10
- By decision: 7
- Losses: 12
- By knockout: 1
- By submission: 1
- By decision: 10

Amateur Muay Thai record
- Total: 21
- Wins: 21
- By knockout: 17

Other information
- Notable relatives: Dhiego Lima (brother)
- Mixed martial arts record from Sherdog

Douglas Lima (born 5 January 1988) is a Brazilian mixed martial artist who competes in the Welterweight and Middleweight divisions. He formerly competed for Bellator MMA, where he is a former three-time Bellator Welterweight Champion. He is also the former MFC Welterweight Champion. Lima and his younger brother, Dhiego, own and operate American Top Team - Team Lima in Duluth, Georgia.

== Background ==
Lima was born and grew up initially in Aparecida de Goiânia, Brazil. Douglas took interest in martial arts from Bruce Lee and Jean-Claude Van Damme movies, and started training capoeira. In 2000, Lima moved to Atlanta, Georgia with his family, and eventually started training Muay Thai and Brazilian jiu-jitsu at the age of 14. He graduated from Joseph Wheeler High School. He trained at American Top Team Atlanta with Roan Carneiro.

== Mixed martial arts career ==
=== Early career ===
Lima began his professional mixed martial arts career with decent success, soon compiling a record of 5–0.

In February 2007, Lima faced the future Ultimate Fighter competitor Matt Brown for the ISCF (International Sport Combat Federation) Pro East Coast Welterweight Title. Brown dealt Lima his first professional loss by defeating him via TKO due to punches in the second round.

=== American Fight League ===
In May 2008, Lima had his first defense of the title against Brent Weedman. Weedman was reportedly brought in to the fight to showcase Lima's skills, as Weedman was expected to be an easy fight. Weedman threatened early on with a triangle choke which was unsuccessful. Late in the second round, Weedman again caught Lima in a triangle choke, but transitioned to an armbar, which forced Lima to submit, giving Weedman the title. Weedman would later go on to say "They brought me in because Douglas Lima would make a great champ for them. Now, it's my turn to step up. I feel good about the fact that I did a one-fight deal with them. We're going to talk a multi-fight contract now." Following the loss, Lima never appeared for the AFL promotion again.

=== World Extreme Cagefighting ===
Following another win via TKO, Lima joined World Extreme Cagefighting. His debut fight was scheduled to take place at WEC 39 against Justin Haskins. However, Lima was forced to withdraw from the card while waiting on papers to arrive from the U.S. Bureau of Citizenship and Immigration Services. Lima's WEC debut never transpired, as instead, he joined King of the Cage, where he faced another future Ultimate Fighter competitor in Charles Blanchard, losing by unanimous decision.

=== Maximum Fighting Championship ===
In September 2010, Douglas Lima joined the Maximum Fighting Championship, facing off against Ryan Ford. In front of Ford's hometown fans, Lima was able to defeat Ford via armbar, early in the second round.

With the win, Lima was given an MFC Welterweight title shot against Jesse Juarez at MFC 27. Lima went on to defeat Juarez via armbar, midway through the final round.

Lima then defended the title against Terry Martin at MFC 29, winning the fight via first-round TKO.

=== Bellator Fighting Championships ===
In May 2011, it was announced that Lima had signed to fight for Bellator Fighting Championships.

Lima entered into the Bellator Season 5 Welterweight Tournament. He fought Steve Carl in the opening round held at Bellator 49 and won the fight via unanimous decision. Lima fought Chris Lozano in the semifinals at Bellator 53 and won via KO in the second round. In the finals held at Bellator 57, he claimed the tournament victory and earned a shot at the title by knocking out Ben Saunders in the second round.

==== First title shot ====
Lima got his title shot against welterweight champion Ben Askren at Bellator 64 on April 6, 2012. He lost the fight via unanimous decision.

Lima defeated Jacob Ortiz via head kick and knee at 4:50 of the third round at Bellator 79 on November 2, 2012.

==== Bellator Season Eight tournament ====
Lima faced Russian MMA prospect Michail Tsarev in Season Eight Welterweight Tournament on January 24, 2013 at Bellator 86. He won the fight via TKO due to leg strikes in round 2. In the semi-finals, he was scheduled to face Brent Weedman, but ultimately Weedman suffered an injury and was replaced by Bryan Baker at Bellator 90 on February 21, 2013. He won the fight via knock out in the first round. He was expected to face Ben Saunders in a rematch in the tournament final at Bellator 93. However, Lima suffered a broken hand and the rematch was postponed, finally taking place at Bellator 100 on September 20, 2013. Lima once again won in the second round, this time via a brutal head kick knockout.

==== First Bellator Welterweight Championship reign ====
Lima faced judo olympian Rick Hawn at Bellator 117 on April 18, 2014, for the vacant Bellator Welterweight Championship. After several knockdowns due to leg kicks, Lima won via TKO due to corner stoppage to win the vacant Bellator Welterweight Championship.

Lima was scheduled to make his first title defense against Paul Daley on February 27, 2015 at Bellator 134. However, in January, it was announced that Lima had pulled out of the fight due to injury. Lima was replaced by fellow Brazilian André Santos.

After 15 months away from the sport due to knee injuries, Lima returned to defend his title against Bellator Season Ten Welterweight tournament winner Andrey Koreshkov at Bellator 140 on July 17, 2015. He lost the fight and title by unanimous decision.

==== Return to title contention and second reign ====
After nearly a year away from the sport, Lima returned to the Bellator cage to replace Josh Koscheck against Paul Daley at Bellator 158 on July 16, 2016. He won the fight via unanimous decision.

The win over Daley earned Lima a rematch against Bellator Welterweight Champion Andrey Koreshkov. The two met in the main event at Bellator 164 on November 10, 2016. Lima regained his title by winning by knockout in the third round.

For the first defense of his second title reign, Lima faced Lorenz Larkin at Bellator NYC on June 24, 2017. He won the fight via a unanimous decision (50–45, 48–47, and 48–47) to retain the Bellator welterweight championship.

On September 6, 2017 Lima announced that he had signed a six-fight, two-year contract with Bellator.

For the second defense of his title, Lima faced Rory MacDonald at Bellator 192 on January 20, 2018. He lost the back-and-forth fight by unanimous decision.

==== 2019 Bellator Welterweight GP and third reign ====
Lima faced Andrey Koreshkov in a third match as part of the opening round of the Bellator Welterweight World Grand Prix on September 29, 2018 at Bellator 206. He won the fight via a rear-naked choke in the fifth round.

In the tournament semifinals, Lima faced the undefeated Michael Page in the co-main event at Bellator 221 on May 11, 2019. Lima won the fight via knockout in round two.

In the Bellator Welterweight World Grand Prix final, Lima challenged Rory MacDonald in a rematch for the welterweight title at Bellator 232 on October 26, 2019. He won the fight by unanimous decision to become a three-time Bellator welterweight champion and the 2019 Welterweight Grand Prix winner, receiving the $1,000,000 prize.

==== Attempt at middleweight championship ====
As the first fight of his new, multi-year contract, Lima was scheduled to face Gegard Mousasi for the vacant Bellator Middleweight World Championship at Bellator 242 on May 9, 2020. However, it was later announced that Bellator 242 and Lima's fight against Mousasi were being postponed due to the COVID-19 pandemic. Instead, Lima faced Mousasi on October 29 at Bellator 250. Lima lost the fight via unanimous decision.

In the first defense of his title in his third reign as Bellator Welterweight World Champion, Lima faced undefeated Yaroslav Amosov at Bellator 260 on June 11, 2021. He lost the bout by unanimous decision.

==== Losing streak ====
Lima faced Michael Page in a rematch on October 1, 2021 at Bellator 267. He lost the bout via split decision. 6 out of 7 media outlets scored the bout as a win for Lima.

Lima was scheduled to face Jason Jackson on May 13, 2022 at Bellator 281. However, for unknown reasons, the bout was pulled from the event and was rescheduled for July 22, 2022 at Bellator 283. After the main event was scrapped and the reshuffling of the bouts, Lima vs. Jackson was upgraded to the main event and 5 rounds. At the weigh-ins, Douglas Lima, came in at 172.8 lbs, 1.8 pounds heavy for his headlining welterweight bout. The bout proceeded at a catchweight and Lima was fined a percentage of his individual purse, which went to Jackson. Lima lost the bout via unanimous decision, getting controlled on the ground for 5 rounds.

==== Return to middleweight ====
Moving up to Middleweight once again, Lima faced Costello van Steenis on May 12, 2023 at Bellator 296. He won the bout via unanimous decision.

With one fight remaining on his prevailing contract, Lima signed a new multi-year contract with PFL after publicly scolding the organization for keeping him benched for over a year for allegedly too high purse. As the first bout of his new contract, Lima faced Aaron Jeffery at Bellator Champions Series 4 on September 7, 2024. He lost the fight via unanimous decision.

=== Global Fight League ===
On January 16, 2025, it was announced that he had left the promotion and signed with the Global Fight League.

Lima was scheduled to face Uriah Hall on May 25, 2025 at GFL 2. However, all GFL events were postponed indefinitely.

== Professional grappling career ==
Lima competed against Rinat Fakhretdinov at ADXC 2 on January 19, 2024. He lost the match by unanimous decision.

== Personal life ==
Lima and his wife have two daughters and a son.

== Championships and accomplishments ==
- Bellator Fighting Championships
  - Bellator Welterweight World Championship (Three times)
    - One successful title defense (second reign)
  - Bellator Season 8 Welterweight Tournament Winner
  - Bellator Season 5 Welterweight Tournament Winner
  - Bellator Welterweight World Grand Prix Winner
  - Tied (with Patricky Freire) for second most knockouts in Bellator history (nine)
  - Second most wins in Bellator welterweight division history (13)
  - Tied (with Michael Page) for most stoppage victories in Bellator welterweight division history (nine)
  - Tied (with Michael Page and Andrey Koreshkov) for most knockout victories in Bellator welterweight division history (eight)
  - Second most fights in Bellator Welterweight division history (18)
  - Only fighter in Bellator history to win three tournaments
- Maximum Fighting Championship
  - MFC Welterweight Championship (One time; former)
    - One successful title defense
  - Knockout of the Night (One time) vs. Terry Martin
  - Submission of the Night (Two times) vs. Ryan Ford and Jesse Juarez
- Sin City Fight Club/SportFight X
  - 2010 REDLINE Middleweight Grand Prix Champion
- Sherdog
  - 2013 All-Violence Third Team
- MMAJunkie.com
  - 2019 May Knockout of the Month vs. Michael Page

== Mixed martial arts record ==
Professional record breakdown
45 matches	33 wins	12 losses
By knockout	16	1
By submission	10	1
By decision	7	10

Res.	Record	Opponent	Method	Event	Date	Round	Time	Location	Notes
Loss	33–12	Aaron Jeffery	Decision (unanimous)	Bellator Champions Series 4	September 7, 2024	3	5:00	San Diego, California, United States	
Win	33–11	Costello van Steenis	Decision (unanimous)	Bellator 296	May 12, 2023	3	5:00	Paris, France	Return to Middleweight.
Loss	32–11	Jason Jackson	Decision (unanimous)	Bellator 283	July 22, 2022	5	5:00	Tacoma, Washington, United States	Catchweight (172.8 lb) bout; Lima missed weight.
Loss	32–10	Michael Page	Decision (split)	Bellator 267	October 1, 2021	3	5:00	London, England	
Loss	32–9	Yaroslav Amosov	Decision (unanimous)	Bellator 260	June 11, 2021	5	5:00	Uncasville, Connecticut, United States	Lost the Bellator Welterweight World Championship.
Loss	32–8	Gegard Mousasi	Decision (unanimous)	Bellator 250	October 29, 2020	5	5:00	Uncasville, Connecticut, United States	Middleweight debut. For the vacant Bellator Middleweight World Championship.
Win	32–7	Rory MacDonald	Decision (unanimous)	Bellator 232	October 26, 2019	5	5:00	Uncasville, Connecticut, United States	Won the Bellator Welterweight World Grand Prix and the Bellator Welterweight World Championship.
Win	31–7	Michael Page	KO (punches)	Bellator 221	May 11, 2019	2	0:35	Rosemont, Illinois, United States	Bellator Welterweight World Grand Prix Semifinal.
Win	30–7	Andrey Koreshkov	Technical Submission (rear-naked choke)	Bellator 206	September 29, 2018	5	3:04	San Jose, California, United States	Bellator Welterweight World Grand Prix Quarterfinal.
Loss	29–7	Rory MacDonald	Decision (unanimous)	Bellator 192	January 20, 2018	5	5:00	Inglewood, California, United States	Lost the Bellator Welterweight World Championship.
Win	29–6	Lorenz Larkin	Decision (unanimous)	Bellator NYC	June 24, 2017	5	5:00	New York City, New York, United States	Defended the Bellator Welterweight World Championship.
Win	28–6	Andrey Koreshkov	KO (punches)	Bellator 164	November 10, 2016	3	1:21	Tel Aviv, Israel	Won the Bellator Welterweight World Championship.
Win	27–6	Paul Daley	Decision (unanimous)	Bellator 158	July 16, 2016	3	5:00	London, England, United Kingdom	
Loss	26–6	Andrey Koreshkov	Decision (unanimous)	Bellator 140	July 17, 2015	5	5:00	Uncasville, Connecticut, United States	Lost the Bellator Welterweight World Championship.
Win	26–5	Rick Hawn	TKO (corner stoppage)	Bellator 117	April 18, 2014	2	3:19	Council Bluffs, Iowa, United States	Won the vacant Bellator Welterweight World Championship.
Win	25–5	Ben Saunders	KO (head kick)	Bellator 100	September 20, 2013	2	4:33	Phoenix, Arizona, United States	Won the Bellator Season 8 Welterweight Tournament.
Win	24–5	Bryan Baker	KO (punch)	Bellator 90	February 21, 2013	1	2:34	West Valley City, Utah, United States	Bellator Season 8 Welterweight Tournament Semifinal.
Win	23–5	Michail Tsarev	TKO (leg kicks)	Bellator 86	January 24, 2013	2	1:44	Thackerville, Oklahoma, United States	Bellator Season 8 Welterweight Tournament Quarterfinal.
Win	22–5	Jacob Ortiz	TKO (head kick and knee)	Bellator 79	November 2, 2012	3	4:50	Rama, Ontario, Canada	180 lb Catchweight bout.
Loss	21–5	Ben Askren	Decision (unanimous)	Bellator 64	April 6, 2012	5	5:00	Windsor, Ontario, Canada	For the Bellator Welterweight World Championship.
Win	21–4	Ben Saunders	KO (punches)	Bellator 57	November 12, 2011	2	1:21	Rama, Ontario, Canada	Won the Bellator Season 5 Welterweight Tournament.
Win	20–4	Chris Lozano	KO (punch)	Bellator 53	October 8, 2011	2	3:14	Miami, Oklahoma, United States	Bellator Season 5 Welterweight Tournament Semifinal.
Win	19–4	Steve Carl	Decision (unanimous)	Bellator 49	September 10, 2011	3	5:00	Atlantic City, New Jersey United States	Bellator Season 5 Welterweight Tournament Quarterfinal.
Win	18–4	Terry Martin	TKO (punches)	MFC 29: Conquer	April 8, 2011	1	1:14	Windsor, Ontario, Canada	Defended the MFC Welterweight Championship. Knockout of the Night.
Win	17–4	Jesse Juarez	Submission (triangle armbar)	MFC 27	November 12, 2010	3	2:37	Edmonton, Alberta, Canada	Won the vacant MFC Welterweight Championship. Submission of the Night.
Win	16–4	Ryan Ford	Submission (armbar)	MFC 26	September 10, 2010	2	0:48	Edmonton, Alberta, Canada	Submission of the Night.
Win	15–4	Cortez Coleman	Decision (split)	SportFight X-1: Beatdown	March 26, 2010	3	5:00	Atlanta, Georgia, United States	Won the 2010 REDLINE Middleweight Grand Prix.
Win	14–4	Clint Hester	Decision (unanimous)	Sin City Fight Club: Redline Grand Prix Round 2	November 13, 2009	3	5:00	Atlanta, Georgia, United States	2010 REDLINE Middleweight Grand Prix Semifinal.
Win	13–4	Eddie Hernandez	Submission (triangle choke)	Sin City Fight Club: Redline Grand Prix Opening Round	October 10, 2009	1	2:34	Atlanta, Georgia, United States	2010 REDLINE Middleweight Grand Prix Quarterfinal.
Loss	12–4	Eric Dahlberg	Decision (unanimous)	Best of the Best	June 12, 2009	3	5:00	Columbus, Georgia, United States	
Loss	12–3	Charles Blanchard	Decision (unanimous)	KOTC: Invincible	March 27, 2009	3	5:00	Atlanta, Georgia, United States	
Win	12–2	Joseph Baize	TKO (punches)	Southern Kentucky: Combat League	August 23, 2008	1	2:30	Owensboro, Kentucky, United States	
Loss	11–2	Brent Weedman	Submission (armbar)	AFL: Bulletproof	May 30, 2008	2	4:39	Atlanta, Georgia, United States	For the vacant AFL Welterweight Championship.
Win	11–1	Cody Senseney	TKO (punches)	AFL: Eruption	March 7, 2008	1	2:45	Lexington, Kentucky, United States	
Win	10–1	Eric Davila	Submission (armbar)	ROF 31: Undisputed	December 1, 2007	2	3:52	Broomfield, Colorado, United States	
Win	9–1	Daniel Douglas	Submission (rear-naked choke)	RMBB & PCF 1: HellRazor	October 16, 2007	1	0:28	Denver, Colorado, United States	
Win	8–1	Kyle Baker	Submission (triangle armbar)	Reign in the Cage	August 11, 2007	1	4:45	Alabama, United States	
Win	7–1	Ed Nuno	TKO (injury)	XFS 6: Bad Blood	July 14, 2007	1	0:28	Boise, Idaho, United States	
Win	6–1	Joshua Hancock	TKO	Evolution: Mayhem in Albany	March 10, 2007	1	N/A	Albany, Georgia, United States	
Loss	5–1	Matt Brown	TKO (punches)	ISCF: Invasion	February 9, 2007	2	2:50	Kennesaw, Georgia, United States	For the vacant ISCF Eastern U.S. Welterweight Championship.
Win	5–0	Ray Perales	TKO (submission to punches)	Xtreme Fight Series 3	December 15, 2006	1	3:07	Boise, Idaho, United States	
Win	4–0	John Nellermoe	Submission (triangle choke)	ISCF: Southside Slugfest	October 21, 2006	1	1:07	Peachtree City, Georgia, United States	
Win	3–0	Nathan Osterkamp	Submission (rear-naked choke)	Border Warz	October 14, 2006	1	1:57	Colorado Springs, Colorado, United States	
Win	2–0	Steve Linton	Submission (verbal)	ISCF: Fever Fight Night	September 22, 2006	1	N/A	Atlanta, Georgia, United States	
Win	1–0	Carlos Julio Molestina	KO (punches)	Wild Bill's: Fight Night 3	July 14, 2006	1	1:08	Duluth, Georgia, United States	

== See also ==
- List of male mixed martial artists
