= Mark Holata =

American MMA fighter

- Born: August 25, 1982 (age 44); Claremore, Oklahoma, United States
- Other names: The Machine
- Height: 6 ft 2 in (1.88 m)
- Weight: 260.2 lb (118 kg; 18 st 8 lb)
- Division: Heavyweight
- Reach: 72 in (183 cm)
- Fighting out of: Oklahoma City, Oklahoma, United States
- Team: American Top Team OKC
- Years active: 2007-2014

Mixed martial arts record
- Total: 17
- Wins: 12
- By knockout: 3
- By submission: 5
- By decision: 4
- Losses: 5
- By knockout: 4
- By submission: 1

Other information
- Mixed martial arts record from Sherdog

Mark Holata (born August 25, 1982) is an American former mixed martial artist. A professional from 2007 until 2014, he is best known for his appearances in Bellator.

== Background ==
Holata was born in Claremore, Oklahoma and raised in Morris, Oklahoma, attending Morris High School. At Morris, Holata competed in football, and was talented, earning four letters and winning multiple All-State selections including as a punter, as well as being named his district's Offensive Player of the Year as a senior. In addition to football, Holata also received four letters in powerlifting, All-State honors three times, won the state title, and also lettered one year in track and field. Holata continued his football career for the University of Tulsa.

== Mixed martial arts career ==
=== Early career ===
Holata made his professional MMA debut in June 2007. During the first three years of his career, he amassed a record of 8-2.

=== Bellator ===
Holata made his Bellator debut at Bellator 31, where he defeated Shawn Jordan by way of first-round knockout.

In 2011, Holata returned at Bellator 42, where he defeated Tracy Willis by way of first-round submission. At Bellator 52 Holata lost by first-round knockout to Ron Sparks in a quarterfinal of the Bellator Season Five Heavyweight Tournament.

Holata rebounded from the loss by defeating Abe Wagner by first-round submission at Bellator 69.

At Bellator 75 Holata lost by first-round submission to Vinicius Queiroz in a quarterfinal of the Bellator Season Seven Heavyweight Tournament.

In March 2014, Holata returned to Bellator. He faced Alexander Volkov in the opening round of the Bellator Season 10 Heavyweight tournament at Bellator 111 on March 7, 2014. He lost the fight via TKO in the first round.

== Mixed martial arts record ==
Professional record breakdown
17 matches	12 wins	5 losses
By knockout	3	4
By submission	5	1
By decision	4	0

Res.	Record	Opponent	Method	Event	Date	Round	Time	Location	Notes
Loss	12–5	Alexander Volkov	TKO (punches)	Bellator 111	March 7, 2014	1	1:21	Thackerville, Oklahoma, United States	Bellator Season 10 Heavyweight Tournament Quarterfinal.
Loss	12–4	Vinicius Queiroz	Submission (armbar)	Bellator 75	October 5, 2012	1	3:26	Hammond, Indiana, United States	Bellator Season Seven Heavyweight Tournament Quarterfinal.
Win	12–3	Abe Wagner	Submission (achilles lock)	Bellator 69	May 18, 2012	1	2:24	Lake Charles, Louisiana, United States	
Loss	11–3	Ron Sparks	KO (punches)	Bellator 52	October 1, 2011	1	1:24	Lake Charles, Louisiana, United States	Bellator Season Five Heavyweight Tournament Quarterfinal.
Win	11–2	Tracy Willis	Submission (knees and punches)	Bellator 42	April 23, 2011	1	0:49	Concho, Oklahoma, United States	
Win	10–2	Carmelo Marrero	Decision (unanimous)	C3 Fights: SlamFest	January 29, 2011	3	5:00	Newkirk, Oklahoma, United States	
Win	9–2	Shawn Jordan	KO (punch)	Bellator 31	September 30, 2010	1	1:13	Lake Charles, Louisiana, United States	
Win	8–2	James Jack	Decision (unanimous)	C3 Fights: Knockout-Rockout Weekend 3	June 19, 2010	3	3:00	Concho, Oklahoma, United States	
Win	7–2	Jason Nicholsen	Submission (rear-naked choke)	C3 Fights: Knockout-Rockout Weekend 2	April 17, 2010	1	2:09	Clinton, Oklahoma, United States	
Win	6–2	Joel Traves	Decision (unanimous)	C3 Fights: Slammin Jammin Weekend 4	February 13, 2010	3	3:00	Newkirk, Oklahoma, United States	
Win	5–2	Ralph Kelly	TKO (retirement)	C3 Fights: Slammin Jammin Weekend 2	October 30, 2009	1	3:00	Red Rock, Oklahoma, United States	
Win	4–2	John Hill	Submission (rear-naked choke)	Bricktown Brawl 1	May 8, 2009	2	1:19	Oklahoma City, Oklahoma, United States	
Loss	3–2	Darrill Schoonover	TKO (punches)	Freestyle Cage Fighting 23	September 21, 2008	1	2:33	Oklahoma City, Oklahoma, United States	
Loss	3–1	John Orr	TKO (strikes)	C3 Fights: Battle on the Border	March 29, 2008	2	1:48	Newkirk, Oklahoma, United States	
Win	3–0	Danny Howell	TKO (punches)	Masters of the Cage 17	November 17, 2007	1	1:59	Oklahoma City, Oklahoma, United States	
Win	2–0	Ryan Dunphy	Submission	Masters of the Cage 14	July 21, 2007	1	1:50	Oklahoma City, Oklahoma, United States	
Win	1–0	Tony Roberts	Decision (unanimous)	Masters of the Cage 14	June 23, 2007	3	5:00	Oklahoma City, Oklahoma, United States	
