= John Troyer (fighter) =

American mixed martial artist

John Troyer (born August 13, 1985) is an MMA fighter.

== Bellator Fighting Championships ==
Troyer fought three times in the Bellator Fighting Championships. He lost to Justin Edwards at Bellator 5, lost to Brent Weedman at Bellator 23 and defeated Josh Clark at Bellator 30.

== Other promotions ==
Troyer previously fought for Super Fight League and XFC.

== Mixed martial arts record ==
Professional record breakdown
| 29 matches | 15 wins | 13 losses |
| By knockout | 5 | 4 |
| By submission | 8 | 5 |
| By decision | 2 | 4 |
| No contests | 1 | |

John Troyer mixed martial arts record
| Res. | Record | Opponent | Method | Event | Date | Round | Time | Location | Notes |
|---|---|---|---|---|---|---|---|---|---|
| Loss | 15–13 (1) | Muhammad Abdullah | Decision (Unanimous) | VFC 60 - Victory Fighting Championship 60 | 14 April 2018 | 3 | 5:00 | | |
| Win | 15–12 (1) | Marcus Govan | Submission (Rear-Naked Choke) | HFC 36 - Hoosier Fight Club 36 | 3 February 2018 | 1 | 3:40 | | |
| Loss | 14–12 (1) | Todd Chattelle | TKO (Punches) | CES MMA 19 - Rise or Fall | 4 October 2013 | 1 | 4:06 | | |
| Loss | 14–11 (1) | Anthony Lapsley | Submission (Armbar) | MMA Xtreme - Fists Will Fly | 24 August 2013 | 1 | 4:24 | | |
| Loss | 14–10 (1) | Gerardo Julio Gallegos | TKO (Knee and Punches) | XFC 23 - Louisville Slugfest | 19 April 2013 | 2 | 1:41 | | |
| Loss | 14–9 (1) | Xavier Foupa-Pokam | KO (Knee to the Body) | SFL 14 - Super Fight League 14 | 29 March 2013 | 1 | 2:15 | | |
| Win | 14–8 (1) | Vasily Novikov | Decision (Unanimous) | SFL 8 - Super Fight League 8 | 9 November 2012 | 3 | 5:00 | | |
| Loss | 13–8 (1) | Dan Bolden | Decision (Unanimous) | EFL - Evolution Fight League | 20 October 2012 | 3 | 5:00 | | |
| Win | 13–7 (1) | Sean Huffman | Submission (Rear-Naked Choke) | HRMMA - Hardrock MMA 45 | 10 March 2012 | 2 | 2:06 | | |
| NC | 12–7 (1) | Luke Harris | No Contest | AMMA 7 - Confrontation | 10 June 2011 | 1 | 3:14 | | |
| Win | 12–7 | Roger Minton III | Submission (Rear-Naked Choke) | HRMMA - Hardrock MMA 29: 2 Year Anniversary Show | 5 February 2011 | 1 | 0:19 | | |
| Win | 11–7 | Josh Clark | Decision (Unanimous) | BFC - Bellator Fighting Championships 30 | 23 September 2010 | 3 | 5:00 | | |
| Loss | 10–7 | Josh Rosaaen | Submission (Toe Hold) | The Cage Inc. - Battle at the Border 6 | 21 August 2010 | 1 | 3:56 | | |
| Loss | 10–6 | Brent Weedman | Submission (Armbar) | BFC - Bellator Fighting Championships 23 | 24 June 2010 | 1 | 4:55 | | |
| Loss | 10–5 | David Branch | TKO (Punches) | UCC 1 - Merciless | 19 March 2010 | 2 | 4:26 | | |
| Win | 10–4 | J.R. Hines | Submission (Punches) | RFL - Maximum Impact | 27 June 2009 | 1 | 1:28 | | |
| Win | 9–4 | Billy Horne | TKO (Punches) | MMA Big Show - Conviction | 20 June 2009 | 1 | 2:06 | | |
| Loss | 8–4 | Justin Edwards | Submission (Guillotine Choke) | BFC - Bellator Fighting Championships 5 | 1 May 2009 | 1 | 3:12 | | |
| Loss | 8–3 | Alex Andrade | Decision (Unanimous) | RFL - Proving Ground | 26 July 2008 | 5 | 5:00 | | |
| Loss | 8–2 | Nick Thompson | Submission (Rear-Naked Choke) | Tuff-N-Uff - Thompson vs. Troyer | 1 February 2008 | 1 | 3:46 | | |
| Win | 8–1 | Chris Crawford | TKO (Corner Stoppage) | RFL - Revolution Fight League 1 | 1 December 2007 | 1 | 2:08 | | |
| Win | 7–1 | Scott Henze | Submission (Rear-Naked Choke) | HOOKnSHOOT - MW Tournament | 29 September 2007 | 1 | 3:11 | | |
| Win | 6–1 | Joe Baize | TKO (Punches) | HOOKnSHOOT - MW Tournament | 29 September 2007 | 1 | 4:12 | | |
| Win | 5–1 | Andy Fink | Submission (Armbar) | HOOKnSHOOT - MW Tournament | 29 September 2007 | 1 | 1:04 | | |
| Win | 4–1 | Derek Sawyer | TKO (Punches) | KP - Knockout Promotions | 21 July 2007 | 3 | 3:51 | | |
| Win | 3–1 | Pete Barrera | TKO (Punches) | HOOKnSHOOT - Live | 19 May 2007 | 1 | 1:08 | | |
| Win | 2–1 | Troy King | Submission | UFL 3 - United Fight League 3 | 20 October 2006 | 2 | N/A | | |
| Win | 1–1 | Ira Boyd | Submission (Rear-Naked Choke) | HOOKnSHOOT - David vs. Goliath | 9 September 2006 | 1 | 0:00 | | |
| Loss | 0–1 | Nate Moore | Decision (Unanimous) | UFL 2 - United Fight League 2 | 25 August 2006 | 3 | 5:00 | | |
