= Rick Hawn =

American mixed martial arts fighter

- Born: Richard Hawn; September 15, 1976 (age 50); Chicago, Illinois, U.S.
- Other names: Genghis
- Nationality: American
- Height: 5 ft 9 in (175 cm)
- Weight: 155 lb (70 kg; 11 st 1 lb)
- Division: Lightweight (155lb) (currently); Welterweight (170lb) (formerly)
- Fighting out of: Dracut, Massachusetts, United States, Plaistow, NH
- Team: Tristar Gym; Team Sityodtong; Team Renzo Gracie NH Team PMA
- Rank: Black belt in Judo; Black belt in Brazilian Jiu-Jitsu
- Years active: 2009–2015

Mixed martial arts record
- Total: 26
- Wins: 21
- By knockout: 11
- By decision: 10
- Losses: 5
- By knockout: 1
- By submission: 2
- By decision: 2

Other information
- Mixed martial arts record from Sherdog
- Judo career
- Weight class: ‍–‍81 kg, ‍–‍90 kg

Judo achievements and titles
- Olympic Games: 9th (2004)
- World Champ.: R64 (2007)
- Pan American Champ.: (bronze) (1999, 2002)
Medal record
Men's judo
Representing United States
Pan American Games
Bronze medal – third place	2007 Rio de Janeiro	‍–‍90 kg
Pan American Championships
Bronze medal – third place	1999 Montevideo	‍–‍81 kg
Bronze medal – third place	2002 Santo Domingo	‍–‍81 kg

Profile at external judo databases
- IJF: 52933
- JudoInside.com: 8058

Richard Hawn (born September 15, 1976), known as Rick Hawn, is a former Olympic judoka and professional mixed martial artist. A professional MMA fighter from 2009 to 2015, Hawn most notably competed for Bellator MMA, where he won the Bellator Season 6 Lightweight Tournament and the Bellator Season 9 Welterweight Tournament.

== Background ==
Hawn was born in Chicago, but when he was young, his family moved to Eugene, Oregon. At age 12, Hawn began training in judo when his father got back into the sport. Hawn continued to compete while attending South Eugene High School, where he also competed in wrestling, and also football in his senior year.

=== Olympic career ===
In 1996, after graduating from high school, Hawn qualified to live at the Olympic Training Center in Colorado Springs, Colorado. There, he trained in judo for eight years and ultimately qualified for the 2004 Olympic Games. At the Games in 2004, Hawn went 2-2 and finished in 9th place. Hawn also won numerous medals at the U.S. national championships and two medals at the Pan American Games.

After the 2004 Games, Hawn moved to Boston to train with bronze medalist Jimmy Pedro. However, Hawn failed to make the 2008 Olympic judo team. Soon after, Hawn began training for a career in Mixed Martial Arts.

== Mixed martial arts career ==
=== Early career ===
Hawn's professional mixed martial arts debut came in January 2009 in Worcester, Massachusetts. Hawn won by a technical knockout in the first round. Over the next two years, Hawn won his next eight fights, six by TKO.

=== Bellator MMA ===
In March 2011, Hawn began competing in the Bellator MMA's Season Four Welterweight Tournament. He defeated Jim Wallhead by a unanimous decision in the quarterfinals and Lyman Good by a split decision in the semifinals.

Hawn was defeated by Jay Hieron at Bellator 43 in a fight which some believe was a controversial split decision.

After a strong showing in the Season Four Tournament, Hawn was planning to return to the cage as part of Bellator's Season Five Welterweight Tournament, but an injury during training forced him out of the tournament.

Hawn returned to the promotion in the spring of 2012 as a participant in the Season Six Lightweight Tournament; dropping down to Lightweight for the first time in his MMA career. He faced Ricardo Tirloni in the opening round at Bellator 62. Tirloni was able to land with a few leg kicks, but Hawn was able to continue pressing forward. Hawn then landed a right hand which dropped Tirloni. Hawn hit Tirloni with punches and hammerfists on the ground and the fight was stopped at 2:36 of the opening round.

He next faced Lloyd Woodard in the semifinals at Bellator 66 on April 20, 2012. Hawn won the fight via KO in the second round. Hawn next took on Brent Weedman in the tournament finals on May 25, 2012, at Bellator 70 in New Orleans, Louisiana. He won the fight via unanimous decision.

At Bellator 95, Hawn faced Karo Parisyan whom Hawn had twice defeated in judo competition. During the bout, Hawn was able to land a right cross, knocking Parisyan to his knees and landing repeated hammerfists on Parisyan, prompting the fight to be stopped 1:55 in the second round.

In the fall of 2013, Hawn entered his second Bellator Welterweight Tournament. He defeated both Herman Terrado and Brent Weedman by a unanimous decision in the quarterfinals and semifinals, respectively.

In the finals, Hawn faced Ron Keslar at Bellator 109 and won via knockout in the third round.

Hawn faced Douglas Lima for the vacant Bellator Welterweight Championship at Bellator 117 on April 18, 2014. He lost the fight via TKO in the second round when his corner stopped the fight due to the amount of leg kicks he was taking.

Hawn faced returning Dave Jansen on October 24, 2014, at Bellator 130. He lost the fight via a unanimous decision.

In November 2014, Hawn announced on Twitter that he was released from the organization.

=== Titan Fighting Championship ===
Hawn has signed with Titan Fighting Championship. He made his promotional debut in a lightweight match at Titan FC 32 on December 19, 2014, against Carlo Prater. Hawn won the fight by a unanimous decision.

Hawn defeated Pat Healy by split decision for the vacant Titan FC Lightweight Championship at Titan FC 35 on September 19, 2015. Healy was stripped of the title for missing weight the day prior.

=== Retirement ===
Hawn officially retired from MMA on October 19, 2015, as the reigning Titan FC Lightweight Champion.

Hawn came out of retirement to face Gesias Cavalcante on October 21, 2022, at Combat FC 2. He lost the bout via guillotine choke in the second round.

== Bare-knuckle boxing ==
=== Bare Knuckle Fighting Championship ===
Hawn was scheduled to make his debut against Scott Lampert in a welterweight bout at BKFC 61 Connecticut on May 11, 2024. Lampert was later replaced by Stephen Stengel; Hawn won the fight by knockout in the first round.

Hawn was scheduled to face Milton Volter on June 14, 2025 at BKFC Fight Night 26. However, the Volter withdrew for unknown reasons and was repalced by Sergio Lopez. Hawn lost the fight by technical knockout in the third round.

== Championships and accomplishments ==
=== Mixed martial arts ===
- Bellator Fighting Championships
  - Bellator Season Four Welterweight Tournament Runner-Up
  - Bellator Season Six Lightweight Tournament Championship
  - Bellator Season Nine Welterweight Tournament Championship
- Titan Fighting Championship
  - Titan FC Lightweight Championship (One time)
- Triumph Fighter
  - Triumph Fighter Welterweight Champion (One time)

== Mixed martial arts record ==
Professional record breakdown
26 matches	21 wins	5 losses
By knockout	11	1
By submission	0	2
By decision	10	2

Res.	Record	Opponent	Method	Event	Date	Round	Time	Location	Notes
Loss	21–5	Gesias Cavalcante	Submission (guillotine choke)	Combat FC 2	October 21, 2022	2	3:41	Wilmington, Massachusetts, United States	Return to Welterweight.
Win	21–4	Pat Healy	Decision (split)	Titan FC 35	September 19, 2015	5	5:00	Ridgefield, Washington, United States	Won the Titan FC Lightweight Championship.
Win	20–4	Derek Loffer	Decision (unanimous)	CES 28	March 13, 2015	3	5:00	Lincoln, Rhode Island, United States	Catchweight (165 lb) bout.
Win	19–4	Carlo Prater	Decision (unanimous)	Titan FC 32	December 19, 2014	3	5:00	Lowell, Massachusetts, United States	
Loss	18–4	Dave Jansen	Decision (unanimous)	Bellator 130	October 24, 2014	3	5:00	Mulvane, Kansas, United States	Return to Lightweight.
Loss	18–3	Douglas Lima	TKO (corner stoppage)	Bellator 117	April 18, 2014	2	3:19	Council Bluffs, Iowa, United States	For the vacant Bellator Welterweight Championship.
Win	18–2	Ron Keslar	KO (punch)	Bellator 109	November 22, 2013	3	0:55	Bethlehem, Pennsylvania, United States	Bellator Season Nine Welterweight Tournament Final.
Win	17–2	Brent Weedman	Decision (unanimous)	Bellator 104	October 18, 2013	3	5:00	Cedar Rapids, Iowa, United States	Bellator Season Nine Welterweight Tournament Semifinal.
Win	16–2	Herman Terrado	Decision (unanimous)	Bellator 100	September 20, 2013	3	5:00	Phoenix, Arizona, United States	Bellator Season Nine Welterweight Tournament Quarterfinal.
Win	15–2	Karo Parisyan	KO (punches)	Bellator 95	April 4, 2013	2	1:55	Atlantic City, New Jersey, United States	Welterweight bout.
Loss	14–2	Michael Chandler	Submission (rear-naked choke)	Bellator 85	January 17, 2013	2	3:07	Irvine, California, United States	For the Bellator Lightweight Championship.
Win	14–1	Brent Weedman	Decision (unanimous)	Bellator 70	May 25, 2012	3	5:00	New Orleans, Louisiana, United States	Bellator Season Six Lightweight Tournament Final.
Win	13–1	Lloyd Woodard	KO (punch)	Bellator 66	April 20, 2012	2	0:10	Cleveland, Ohio, United States	Bellator Season Six Lightweight Tournament Semifinal.
Win	12–1	Ricardo Tirloni	KO (punches)	Bellator 62	March 23, 2012	1	2:36	Laredo, Texas, United States	Bellator Season Six Lightweight Tournament Quarterfinal.
Loss	11–1	Jay Hieron	Decision (split)	Bellator 43	May 7, 2011	3	5:00	Newkirk, United States	Bellator Season Four Welterweight Tournament Final.
Win	11–0	Lyman Good	Decision (split)	Bellator 39	April 2, 2011	3	5:00	Uncasville, United States	Bellator Season Four Welterweight Tournament Semifinal.
Win	10–0	Jim Wallhead	Decision (unanimous)	Bellator 35	March 5, 2011	3	5:00	Lemoore, United States	Bellator Season Four Welterweight Tournament Quarterfinal.
Win	9–0	LeVon Maynard	KO (punches)	Bellator 33	October 11, 2010	1	4:53	Philadelphia, United States	Bellator Season Four Welterweight Tournament Qualifier.
Win	8–0	Shonie Carter	TKO (head kick & punches)	Triumph Fighter 3: Havoc	July 31, 2010	2	4:08	Milford, New Hampshire, United States	Won the Triumph Fighter Welterweight Championship.
Win	7–0	Dennis Olson	TKO (punches)	Triumph Fighter 2: Inferno	June 5, 2010	2	2:02	Milford, New Hampshire, United States	
Win	6–0	Tom Gallicchio	Decision (unanimous)	World Championship Fighting 9	February 26, 2010	3	5:00	Wilmington, Massachusetts, United States	
Win	5–0	Brendan Weafer	Decision (unanimous)	CFX 5: Mayhem in Mansfield	September 12, 2009	3	5:00	Mansfield, Massachusetts, United States	
Win	4–0	Bruce Boyington	TKO (punches)	CFX 3: Rumble in the Jungle	June 20, 2009	1	3:03	Plymouth, Massachusetts, United States	
Win	3–0	Daniel Ford	TKO (punches)	CFX 2: Thunder in the Dome	April 25, 2009	1	1:49	Milford, New Hampshire, United States	
Win	2–0	Billy Flynn	KO (punches)	World Championship Fighting 6	March 14, 2009	1	1:12	Wilmington, Massachusetts, United States	
Win	1–0	Bruno Decosta	TKO (punches)	CFX 1: Wartown Beatdown	January 17, 2009	1	2:01	Worcester, Massachusetts, United States	

== Bare knuckle boxing record ==
Professional record breakdown
2 matches	1 win	1 loss
By knockout	1	1

Res.	Record	Opponent	Method	Event	Date	Round	Time	Location	Notes
Loss	1–1	Sergio Lopez	TKO	BKFC Fight Night Mohegan Sun: Porter vs. Cleckler	June 14, 2025	3	0:30	Uncasville, Connecticut, United States	
Win	1–0	Stephen Stengel	KO (punch)	BKFC 61	May 11, 2024	1	0:35	Uncasville, Connecticut, United States	
