= 2011 in Bellator MMA =

Mixed martial arts events

Information
- Promotion: Bellator MMA
- First date aired: March 5, 2011
- Last date aired: November 26, 2011

2011 in Bellator MMA was the fourth installment of the Bellator Fighting Championships. Mixed martial arts tournaments were held in multiple weight classes, including three of the original tournament classes: Welterweight, Lightweight and Featherweight. There was also an inaugural Light Heavyweight Tournament taking place during this season, which crowned the first Light Heavyweight Champion in Bellator. This was the first season to air on MTV2.

== Bellator 35 ==
Bellator 35
- Promotion: Bellator Fighting Championships
- Date: March 5, 2011
- Venue: Tachi Palace Hotel & Casino
- City: Lemoore, California

Event chronology
Bellator 34	Bellator 35	Bellator 36

Bellator 35 was a mixed martial arts event held by Bellator Fighting Championships. The event took place on March 5, 2011, at the Tachi Palace Hotel and Casino in Lemoore, California. The card kicked off Bellator Season Four and featured opening round fights in the Season Four Welterweight Tournament. The event was distributed live in prime time by MTV2.

=== Background ===
On December 14, 2010, Bellator and MTV2 announced a three-year deal to broadcast Bellator's tournaments and special events. This will be the first Bellator event to air on MTV2.

Bellator's Women's Strawweight Champion Zoila Frausto fought in a non-title catchweight bout against Karina Hallinan.

At this event Steve Carl was expected to fight Jay Hieron in the opening round of the welterweight tournament. However, Carl injured himself during training and was removed from the tournament. His replacement was Anthony Lapsley.

Poppies Martinez was expected to fight at this event, but a bout never materialized.

The event drew an average of around 200,000 viewers on MTV2. Which helped MTV2 in several key advertising demographics including, an 83 percent increase among men aged 18 to 49, an 80 percent increase among men 18 to 34, and a 133 percent increase among men aged 25 to 34.

=== Results ===
Main card
Weight class				Method	Round	Time	Notes
Welterweight	Lyman Good	def.	Chris Lozano	Unanimous decision (29–28, 30–27, 30–27)	3	5:00	(Note: Welterweight quarterfinal.)
Welterweight	Jay Hieron	def.	Anthony Lapsley	technical submission (rear-naked choke)	1	3:39	(Note: Welterweight quarterfinal.)
Welterweight	Rick Hawn	def.	Jim Wallhead	Unanimous decision (29–28, 29–28, 30–27)	3	5:00	(Note: Welterweight quarterfinal.)
Welterweight	Brent Weedman	def.	Dan Hornbuckle	unanimous decision (29–28, 29–28, 29–28).	3	5:00	(Note: Welterweight quarterfinal.)
Local feature fights
Women's (125 lb)	Zoila Gurgel	def.	Karina Hallinan	Unanimous decision (30–27, 30–27, 30–27)	3	5:00
Catchweight (175 lb)	Waachiim Spiritwolf	def.	Jaime Jara	Split decision (28–29, 29–28, 30–27)	3	5:00	(Note: This bout aired the following week on Bellator 36.)
Featherweight	Brandon Bender	def.	Josh Herrick	Submission (guillotine choke)	1	3:42
Bantamweight	Paul Ruiz	def.	Jesus Castro	TKO (punches)	1	1:17

== Bellator 36 ==
Bellator 36
- Promotion: Bellator Fighting Championships
- Date: March 12, 2011
- Venue: Shreveport Municipal Auditorium
- City: Shreveport, Louisiana

Event chronology
Bellator 35	Bellator 36	Bellator 37

Bellator 36 was a mixed martial arts event held by Bellator Fighting Championships. The event took place on March 12, 2011, at the Shreveport Municipal Auditorium in Shreveport, Louisiana. The card featured opening-round fights in the Bellator Season Four Lightweight Tournament. The event was distributed live in prime time by MTV2.

=== Background ===
Toby Imada was originally scheduled to face French fighter Ferrid Kheder; however, Kheder refused to weigh in and Josh Shockley was moved up from the preliminary card to face Imada.

Shockley's original opponent, Kelvin Hackney, still weighed in, but was pulled off the card and paid his show money and win bonus. Hackney was expected to fight at Bellator 45.

The event drew an estimated 230,000 viewers on MTV2.

=== Results ===
Main card
Weight class				Method	Round	Time	Notes
Lightweight	Patricky Freire	def.	Rob McCullough	TKO (punches)	3	3:11	(Note: Lightweight quarterfinal.)
Lightweight	Toby Imada	def.	Josh Shockley	Verbal submission (armbar)	1	1:36	(Note: Lightweight quarterfinal.)
Lightweight	Lloyd Woodard	def.	Carey Vanier	TKO (punches)	2	0:46	(Note: Lightweight quarterfinal.)
Lightweight	Michael Chandler	def.	Marcin Held	Technical submission (arm-triangle choke)	1	3:56	(Note: Lightweight quarterfinal.)
Local feature fights
Middleweight	Chad Leonhardt	def.	Kelly Leo	TKO (corner stoppage)	2	5:00
Catchweight (150 lb)	Kevin Aguilar	def.	Matt Hunt	TKO (punches)	1	3:02	(Note: This bout aired on the MTV2 broadcast following Imada vs. Shockley.)
Catchweight (150 lb)	Booker Arthur	def.	Javone Duhon	Verbal submission (elbows)	2	2:31

== Bellator 37 ==
Bellator 37
- Promotion: Bellator Fighting Championships
- Date: March 19, 2011
- Venue: Lucky Star Casino
- City: Concho, Oklahoma

Event chronology
Bellator 36	Bellator 37	Bellator 38

Bellator 37 was a mixed martial arts event held by Bellator Fighting Championships. The event took place on March 19, 2011, at the Lucky Star Casino in Concho, Oklahoma. The card featured opening round fights in the Bellator Season Four Featherweight Tournament. The event was distributed live in prime time by MTV2. The event drew an estimated 173,000 viewers on MTV2.

=== Results ===
Main card
Weight class				Method	Round	Time	Notes
Featherweight	Patricio Freire	def.	Georgi Karakhanyan	KO (punches)	3	0:56	(Note: Featherweight quarterfinal.)
Featherweight	Wilson Reis	def.	Zac George	Submission (rear naked choke)	1	2:09	(Note: Featherweight quarterfinal.)
Featherweight	Daniel Straus	def.	Nazareno Malegarie	Unanimous decision (29–28, 29–28, 29–28)	3	5:00	(Note: Featherweight quarterfinal.)
Featherweight	Kenny Foster	def.	Eric Larkin	Submission (guillotine choke)	1	3:15	(Note: Featherweight quarterfinal.)
Local feature fights
Middleweight	Jake Rosholt	def.	John Bryant	Technical submission (rear naked choke)	1	1:02
Lightweight	Jeremy Spoon	def.	Jerrod Sanders	Submission (rear naked choke)	2	0:26
Featherweight	Roli Delgado	def.	Jameel Massouh	Unanimous decision (29–28, 29–28, 30–27)	3	5:00
Lightweight	Brandon Shelton	def.	Adam Snook	Submission (arm-triangle choke)	1	2:45

== Bellator 38 ==
Bellator 38
- Promotion: Bellator Fighting Championships
- Date: March 26, 2011
- Venue: Harrah's Tunica Hotel and Casino
- City: Tunica, Mississippi

Event chronology
Bellator 37	Bellator 38	Bellator 39

Bellator 38 was mixed martial arts event held by Bellator Fighting Championships. The event took place on March 26, 2011, at Harrah's Tunica Hotel and Casino in Tunica, Mississippi. The card featured the opening round fights in the Bellator Season Four Light Heavyweight Tournament. The event was distributed live in prime time by MTV2.

=== Background ===
This event showcased the inaugural light heavyweight tournament.

Originally, Blagoy Ivanov was set to fight John Brown on the undercard. However, Brown pulled out of the bout and was replaced by Johnathan Ivey. Ivey was then pulled off the card for a suspension by the Georgia Athletic Commission. Ivanov instead fought William Penn.

The event drew an estimated 150,000 viewers on MTV2.

=== Results ===
Main card
Weight class				Method	Round	Time	Notes
Light Heavyweight	Tim Carpenter	def.	Daniel Gracie	Split decision (29–28, 28–29, 29–28)	3	5:00	(Note: Light Heavyweight quarterfinal.)
Light Heavyweight	D.J. Linderman	def.	Raphael Davis	TKO (Punches)	3	3:40	(Note: Light Heavyweight quarterfinal.)
Light Heavyweight	Rich Hale	def.	Nik Fekete	Submission (inverted triangle choke)	1	1:55	(Note: Light Heavyweight quarterfinal.)
Light Heavyweight	Christian M'Pumbu	def.	Chris Davis	TKO (strikes)	3	3:34	(Note: Light Heavyweight quarterfinal.)
Local feature fights
Lightweight	Austin Lyons	def.	Jimmy Van Horn	Submission (armbar)	1	2:10
Catchweight (150 lb)	Jake Underwood	def.	Tim Galluzzi	Submission (triangle choke)	1	1:04
Light Heavyweight	Cody Donovan	def.	Brian Albin	Unanimous decision (30–27, 30–27, 30–27).	3	5:00
Heavyweight	Blagoy Ivanov	def.	William Penn	TKO (punches)	1	2:58
Middleweight	Amaechi Oselukwue	def.	Abe Wilson	Unanimous decision (29–28, 29–28, 29–28)	3	5:00

== Bellator 39 ==
Bellator 39
- Promotion: Bellator Fighting Championships
- Date: April 2, 2011
- Venue: Mohegan Sun Arena
- City: Uncasville, Connecticut

Event chronology
Bellator 38	Bellator 39	Bellator 40

Bellator 39 was a mixed martial arts held by Bellator Fighting Championships. The event took place on April 2, 2011, at the Mohegan Sun Arena in Uncasville, Connecticut. The card featured one semi-final fight in both the Bellator Season Four Welterweight and Lightweight Tournaments. The event was distributed live in prime time by MTV2.

=== Background ===
The lightweight semifinal bout between Toby Imada and Patricky Freire was originally set to take place at Bellator 40.

In a last-minute change not announced by the promotion, Luiz Azeredo stepped in to replace Matt Veach in a preliminary card matchup.

The event drew an estimated 174,000 viewers on MTV2.

=== Results ===
Main card
Weight class				Method	Round	Time	Notes
Lightweight	Eddie Alvarez (c)	def.	Pat Curran	Unanimous decision (49–46, 50–45, 50–45)	5	5:00	(Note: For the Bellator Lightweight Championship.)
Welterweight	Rick Hawn	def.	Lyman Good	Split decision (29–28, 28–29, 30–27)	3	5:00	(Note: Welterweight semifinal.)
Lightweight	Patricky Freire	def.	Toby Imada	KO (Flying Knee & Punches)	1	2:53	(Note: Lightweight semifinal.)
Catchweight (175 lb)	Ben Saunders	def.	Matt Lee	TKO (Doctor Stoppage)	3	1:24
Local feature fights
Middleweight	Dan Cramer	def.	Greg Rebello	Unanimous decision (30–27, 30–27, 30–27)	3	5:00	(Note: This was a "dark" fight, after the main event.)
Welterweight	Ryan Quinn	def.	Mike Winters	Unanimous decision (30–27, 30–27, 30–26)	3	5:00
Lightweight	Dave Jansen	def.	Scott McAfee	Submission (D'arce choke)	1	4:58
Catchweight (160 lbs)	Renê Nazare	def.	Luiz Azeredo	TKO (Injury)	1	5:00
Bantamweight	John McLaughlin	def.	Blair Tugman	Unanimous decision (29–28, 29–28, 29–28)	3	5:00

== Bellator 40 ==
Bellator 40
- Promotion: Bellator Fighting Championships
- Date: April 9, 2011
- Venue: First Council Casino
- City: Newkirk, Oklahoma

Event chronology
Bellator 39	Bellator 40	Bellator 41

Bellator 40 was a mixed martial arts event held by Bellator Fighting Championships. The event took place on April 9, 2011, at First Council Casino in Newkirk, Oklahoma. The card featured fights in the Welterweight and Lightweight Bellator Season Four Tournament. The event was distributed live in prime time by MTV2.

=== Background ===
Bellator Welterweight champion Ben Askren competed in a non-title bout against Nick Thompson at this event.

A lightweight semifinal bout between Toby Imada and Patricky Freire was originally set to take place on this card. However, the fight was moved to Bellator 39 and replaced with the welterweight semifinal fight between Brent Weedman and Jay Hieron. The Hieron-Weedman fight was rescheduled because Weedman needed to receive clearance for a facial laceration suffered in his Bellator 35 victory over Dan Hornbuckle.

Former Sengoku fighter Ronnie Mann was expected to make his Bellator debut at this event. However, visa issues kept Mann from entering the United States and his fight has been pushed back to the Bellator 42 card.

The event drew an estimated 218,000 viewers on MTV2.

=== Results ===
Main card
Weight class				Method	Round	Time	Notes
Welterweight	Ben Askren	def.	Nick Thompson	Unanimous decision (30–26, 30–27, 30–27)	3	5:00
Welterweight	Jay Hieron	def.	Brent Weedman	Unanimous decision (29–28, 29–28, 29–28)	3	5:00	(Note: Welterweight semifinal.)
Lightweight	Michael Chandler	def.	Lloyd Woodard	unanimous decision (29–28, 29–28, 29–28)	3	5:00	(Note: Lightweight semifinal.)
Local feature fights
Welterweight	Tyler Stinson	def.	Nate James	Split decision (28–29, 29–28, 29–28)	3	5:00
Lightweight	Michael Osborn	def.	Cody Carillo	TKO (strikes)	1	1:27
Heavyweight	Eric Prindle	def.	Josh Burns	TKO (doctor stoppage)	2	5:00	(Note: To earn a spot in Bellator's Season Five Heavyweight Tournament. The bout aired on the main broadcast.)
Welterweight	David Rickels	def.	Dylan Smith	Submission (triangle choke)	1	3:32

== Bellator 41 ==
Bellator 41
- Promotion: Bellator Fighting Championships
- Date: April 16, 2011
- Venue: Cocopah Resort and Casino
- City: Yuma, Arizona

Event chronology
Bellator 40	Bellator 41	Bellator 42

Bellator 41 was a mixed martial arts event held by Bellator Fighting Championships on April 16, 2011, at Cocopah Resort and Casino in Yuma, Arizona. The card featured two semi-final fights in the Bellator Season Four Featherweight Tournament. The event was distributed live in prime time by MTV2.

=== Background ===
Tony Johnson was expected to fight Carlos Flores at the event, but for unknown reasons was replaced by Rudy Aguilar.

The event drew a season low of 132,000 average viewers on MTV2.

=== Results ===
Main card
Weight class				Method	Round	Time	Notes
Catchweight (137 lb)	Joe Warren	def.	Marcos Galvão	Unanimous decision (30–27, 29–28. 29–28)	3	5:00
Featherweight	Patricio Freire	def.	Wilson Reis	KO (punches)	3	3:29	(Note: Featherweight semifinal.)
Bantamweight	Zach Makovsky	def.	Chad Robichaux	TKO (strikes)	3	2:02
Featherweight	Daniel Straus	def.	Kenny Foster	Submission (guillotine choke)	3	3:48	(Note: Featherweight semifinal.)
Local feature fights
Heavyweight	Carlos Flores	def.	Rudy Aguilar	TKO (punches)	1	1:19	(Note: This bout took place after the main event.)
Bantamweight	Anthony Birchak	def.	Tyler Bialecki	Submission (D'arce choke)	1	4:06
Featherweight	Nick Piedmont	def.	Michael Parker	Split decision (30–27, 28–29, 29–28)	3	5:00
Middleweight	Brendan Tierney	def.	Dano Moore	Submission (armbar)	1	0:49

== Bellator 42 ==
Bellator 42
- Promotion: Bellator Fighting Championships
- Date: April 23, 2011
- Venue: Lucky Star Casino
- City: Concho, Oklahoma

Event chronology
Bellator 41	Bellator 42	Bellator 43

Bellator 42 was a mixed martial arts event held by Bellator Fighting Championships. The event took place on April 23, 2011, at the Lucky Star Casino in Concho, Oklahoma. The card featured the semi-finals in the Bellator Season Four Light Heavyweight Tournament. The event was distributed live in prime time by MTV2.

=== Background ===
Bellator Heavyweight champion Cole Konrad was scheduled to compete in a non-title "super fight" bout against Paul Buentello at this event. However, it was revealed that Buentello had to pull out of the bout due to a back injury.

Former Sengoku fighter Ronnie Mann was expected to make his Bellator debut at Bellator 40. However, visa issues kept Mann from entering the United States and the fight was moved to this card.

Chris Guillen was originally set to fight Mark Holata, but Guillen suffered a last minute injury and was replaced by Tracy Willis.

The event drew an estimated 199,000 viewers on MTV2.

=== Results ===
Main card
Weight class				Method	Round	Time	Notes
Light Heavyweight	Rich Hale	def.	D.J. Linderman	Split decision (29–28, 28–29, 29–28)	3	5:00	(Note: Light Heavyweight semifinal.)
Catchweight (147 lbs)	Ronnie Mann	def.	Josh Arocho	Unanimous decision (30–25, 30–27, 30–27)	3	5:00
Light Heavyweight	Christian M'Pumbu	def.	Tim Carpenter	TKO (punches)	1	2:08	(Note: Light Heavyweight semifinal.)
Bantamweight	Luis Nogueira	def.	Jerod Spoon	Unanimous decision (30–27, 29–28. 29–28)	3	5:00
Local feature fights
Featherweight	Brandon Shelton	def.	Owen Evinger	Submission (rear-naked choke)	1	2:35	(Note: This bout was fought after the main broadcast was finished due to time constraints.)
Catchweight (190 lb)	Jared Hess	def.	Chris Bell	Submission (triangle choke)	1	1:40	(Note: The bout aired on the main broadcast.)
Bantamweight	Shane Howell	def.	Mark Oshiro	Submission (D'arce choke)	1	4:15
Heavyweight	Mark Holata	def.	Tracy Willis	Submission (strikes)	1	0:49

== Bellator 43 ==
Bellator 43
- Promotion: Bellator Fighting Championships
- Date: May 7, 2011
- Venue: First Council Casino
- City: Newkirk, Oklahoma

Event chronology
Bellator 42	Bellator 43	Bellator 44

Bellator 43 was a mixed martial arts held by Bellator Fighting Championships. The event took place on May 7, 2011, at the First Council Casino in Newkirk, Oklahoma. The card featured the final fight in the Bellator Season Four Welterweight Tournament. The event was distributed live in prime time by MTV2.

=== Background ===
A heavyweight bout between Neil Grove and The Ultimate Fighter 10 alumnus, Zak Jensen was scheduled for this event; however, Grove pulled out of the bout on May 3 due to an injury.

A local feature bout between George Burton and John Bryant was also scratched.

The event drew an estimated 182,000 viewers on MTV2.

=== Results ===
Main card
Weight class				Method	Round	Time	Notes
Welterweight	Jay Hieron	def.	Rick Hawn	Split decision (29–28, 28–29, 29–28)	3	5:00	(Note: To win Bellator's Season Four Welterweight Tournament.)
Middleweight	Bryan Baker	def.	Joe Riggs	KO (punch)	2	3:53	(Note: To earn a spot in Bellator's Season Five Middleweight Tournament)
Bantamweight	Chase Beebe	def.	Jose Vega	Submission (guillotine choke)	1	4:06	(Note: To earn a spot in Bellator's Season Five Bantamweight Tournament)
Heavyweight	Ron Sparks	def.	Vince Lucero	Submission (keylock)	1	2:18
Local feature fights
Catchweight (179 lb)	David Rickels	def.	Rich Bouphanouvong	Submission (triangle choke)	2	1:11	(Note: This bout aired on the broadcast.)
Lightweight	Michael Osborn	def.	Mike Schatz	TKO (referee stoppage)	1	1:58

== Bellator 44 ==
Bellator 44
- Promotion: Bellator Fighting Championships
- Date: May 14, 2011
- Venue: Caesar's Resort
- City: Atlantic City, New Jersey

Event chronology
Bellator 43	Bellator 44	Bellator 45

Bellator 44 was a mixed martial arts event held by Bellator Fighting Championships. The event took place on May 14, 2011, at Harrah's Resort. The card featured the final fight in the Bellator Season Four Lightweight Tournament. The event was distributed live in prime time by MTV2.

=== Background ===
EliteXC and Ring of Combat veteran James Jones was expected to fight at this event, but a bout did not materialize.

Lyman Good was scheduled to face Dan Hornbuckle in a welterweight bout. However, on May 6, Good pulled out of the fight due to an injury.

A scheduled bout between Anthony Morrison and Bryan Goldsby was canceled due to Morrison weighing-in 10 pounds over weight.

The event drew a season high of 325,000 average viewers on MTV2.

=== Results ===
Main card
Weight class				Method	Round	Time	Notes
Lightweight	Michael Chandler	def.	Patricky Freire	Unanimous decision (29–27, 29–27, 29–27)	3	5:00	(Note: Lightweight tournament final. Chandler was docked one point in round 3 due to kicks to the groin.)
Middleweight	Hector Lombard	def.	Falaniko Vitale	KO (punch)	3	0:54
Welterweight	Giedrius Karavackas	def.	Sam Oropeza	Submission (scarf hold armlock)	3	3:59
Middleweight	Alexander Shlemenko	def.	Brett Cooper	unanimous decision (30–27, 30–28, 29–28)	3	5:00
Local feature fights
Heavyweight	Jamall Johnson	def.	Randy Smith	Submission (rear-naked choke)	2	4:16
Featherweight	Jeff Lentz	def.	Anthony Leone	Unanimous decision (29–28, 29–28, 29–28)	3	5:00
Middleweight	Jay Silva	def.	Gemiyale Adkins	Unanimous decision (30–26, 30–27, 30–27)	3	5:00

== Bellator 45 ==
Bellator 45
- Promotion: Bellator Fighting Championships
- Date: May 21, 2011
- Venue: L'Auberge du Lac Resort
- City: Lake Charles, Louisiana

Event chronology
Bellator 44	Bellator 45	Bellator 46

Bellator 45 was a mixed martial arts event held by Bellator Fighting Championships. The event took place on May 21, 2011, at the L'Auberge du Lac Resort in Lake Charles, Louisiana. The card featured final round fights in the Bellator Season Four Featherweight and Light Heavyweight Tournaments. The event was distributed live in prime time by MTV2.

=== Background ===
Kalvin Hackney, whose fight was canceled at Bellator 36, was moved to fight at this event.

A bout between Thiago Santos and Derrick Lewis was scrapped after Santos suffered an injury.

The event drew an estimated 264,000 viewers on MTV2.

=== Results ===
Main card
Weight class				Method	Round	Time	Notes
Light Heavyweight	Christian M'Pumbu	def.	Rich Hale	TKO (punches)	3	4:17	(Note: For the inaugural Bellator Light Heavyweight Championship.)
Featherweight	Patricio Freire	def.	Daniel Straus	Unanimous decision (29–28, 30–27, 30–27)	3	5:00	(Note: Featherweight Tournament Championship.)
Middleweight	Sam Alvey	def.	Karl Amoussou	Split decision (29–28, 28–29, 29–28)	3	5:00
Local feature fights
Heavyweight	Shawn Jordan	def.	Johnathan Hill	TKO (strikes)	1	1:56	(Note: This bout was fought after the main event due to time constraints.)
Middleweight	Tim Ruberg	def.	Michael Fleniken	Unanimous decision (30–27, 30–27, 30–27)	3	5:00
Welterweight	Luis Santos	def.	Nicolae Cury	Unanimous decision (30–27, 30–27, 30–27)	3	5:00
Lightweight	Renê Nazare	def.	Kelvin Hackney	Submission (rear-naked choke)	1	4:44
Catchweight (140 lb)	Joseph Abercrombie	def.	Ben Parpart	Submission (rear-naked choke)	1	1:11

== Tournaments ==
=== Light Heavyweight tournament bracket ===
Quarterfinals
(Democratic Republic of the Congo)	Christian M'Pumbu	TKO
(United States)	Chris Davis	3
(United States)	Tim Carpenter	SD
(Brazil)	Daniel Gracie	3
(United States)	Rich Hale	SUB
(United States)	Nik Fekete	1
(United States)	D.J. Linderman	TKO
(United States)	Raphael Davis	3

Semifinals
(Democratic Republic of the Congo)	Christian M'Pumbu	TKO
(United States)	Tim Carpenter	1
(United States)	Rich Hale	SD
(United States)	D.J. Linderman	3

Finals
(Democratic Republic of the Congo)	Christian M'Pumbu	TKO
(United States)	Rich Hale	3

=== Welterweight tournament bracket ===
Quarterfinals
(United States)	Jay Hieron	SUB
(United States)	Anthony Lapsley	1
(United States)	Brent Weedman	UD
(United States)	Dan Hornbuckle	3
(United States)	Rick Hawn	SD
(England)	Jim Wallhead	3
(United States)	Lyman Good	SD
(United States)	Chris Lozano	3

Semifinals
(United States)	Jay Hieron	UD
(United States)	Brent Weedman	3
(United States)	Rick Hawn	SD
(United States)	Lyman Good	3

Finals
(United States)	Jay Hieron	SD
(United States)	Rick Hawn	3

1: Anthony Lapsley replaced Steve Carl after Carl was forced to withdraw due to a foot injury.

=== Lightweight tournament bracket ===
Quarterfinals
(United States)	Michael Chandler	SUB
(Poland)	Marcin Held	1
(United States)	Lloyd Woodard	TKO
(United States)	Carey Vanier	2
(Brazil)	Patricky Freire	TKO
(United States)	Rob McCullough	3
(United States)	Toby Imada	SUB
(United States)	Josh Shockley	1

Semifinals
(United States)	Michael Chandler	UD
(United States)	Lloyd Woodard	3
(Brazil)	Patricky Freire	TKO
(United States)	Toby Imada	1

Finals
(United States)	Michael Chandler	UD
(Brazil)	Patricky Freire	3

1: Josh Shockley replaced Ferrid Kheder after Kheder refused to weigh-in.

=== Featherweight tournament bracket ===
Quarterfinals
(Brazil)	Patricio Freire	KO
(Armenia)	Georgi Karakhanyan	3
(Brazil)	Wilson Reis	SUB
(United States)	Zac George	1
(United States)	Daniel Straus	UD
(Argentina)	Nazareno Malegarie	3
(United States)	Kenny Foster	SUB
(United States)	Eric Larkin	1

Semifinals
(Brazil)	Patricio Freire	KO
(Brazil)	Wilson Reis	3
(United States)	Daniel Straus	SUB
(United States)	Kenny Foster	3

Finals
(Brazil)	Patricio Freire	UD
(United States)	Daniel Straus	3

== Bellator 46 ==
Bellator 46
- Promotion: Bellator Fighting Championships
- Date: June 25, 2011
- Venue: Seminole Hard Rock Hotel & Casino
- City: (United States) Hollywood, Florida

Event chronology
Bellator 45	Bellator 46	Bellator 47

Bellator 46 was a mixed martial arts event held by Bellator Fighting Championships. The event took place on June 25, 2011, at the Seminole Hard Rock Hotel & Casino in Hollywood, Florida. The card was part of Bellator's inaugural Summer Series and featured opening round fights in the Summer Series Tournament. The event was distributed live in prime time by MTV2.

=== Background ===
This event hosted the first round of an eight-man featherweight tournament to be held over the Summer Series.

David Baggett missed the middleweight limit allowance of 186 for non-title fights, weighing in at 191.5 lb, and his bout with Moyses Gabin was scrapped from the card.

The event drew an estimated 185,000 viewers on MTV2.

=== Results ===
Main card
Weight class				Method	Round	Time	Notes
Featherweight	Pat Curran	def.	Luis Palomino	Submission (peruvian neck-tie)	1	3:49	(Note: Featherweight quarterfinal.)
Featherweight	Marlon Sandro	def.	Genair da Silva	Split decision (30–27, 28–29, 29–28)	3	5:00	(Note: Featherweight quarterfinal.)
Featherweight	Nazareno Malegarie	def.	Jacob DeVree	Submission (guillotine choke)	3	1:25	(Note: Featherweight quarterfinal.)
Featherweight	Ronnie Mann	def.	Adam Schindler	KO (punches)	1	4:14	(Note: Featherweight quarterfinal.)
Local feature fights
Women's (115 lb)	Jessica Aguilar	def.	Carla Esparza	Split decision (30–27, 28–29, 30–27)	3	5:00
Heavyweight	Tony Johnson	def.	Derrick Lewis	Unanimous decision (29–28, 29–28, 29–28)	3	5:00
Catchweight (152 lb)	Alexandre Bezerra	def.	Sam Jones	Submission (triangle choke)	1	3:27
Middleweight	Dan Cramer	def.	Josh Samman	Unanimous decision (29–28, 29–28, 29–28)	3	5:00

== Bellator 47 ==
Bellator 47
- Promotion: Bellator Fighting Championships
- Date: July 23, 2011
- Venue: Casino Rama
- City: (Canada) Rama, Ontario

Event chronology
Bellator 46	Bellator 47	Bellator 48

Bellator 47 was a mixed martial arts event held by Bellator Fighting Championships. The event took place on July 23, 2011, at Casino Rama in Rama, Ontario. The card featured semi-final fights in the Bellator 2011 Summer Series Featherweight Tournament. The event was distributed live in prime time by MTV2.

=== Background ===
This event was to feature Joe Warren's first defense of his featherweight title against season four tournament winner Patricio Freire. Freire, however, pulled out of the fight in early July due to a broken hand.

This was Bellator's first event in Canada. Bellator 4 was set to take place in Canada, but was moved due to the promotion unable to come to terms with the Quebec Boxing Commission.

Ben Saunders was expected to fight at this event, but had to pull out due to an undisclosed injury he suffered in training.

Bantamweights Bo Harris and Bryan Goldsby were originally announced to be facing each other, but the bout did not materialize in the days leading up to the event as Harris failed to complete his medical requirements in a timely fashion.

The event drew an estimated 277,000 viewers on MTV2.

=== Results ===
Main card
Weight class				Method	Round	Time	Notes
Featherweight	Pat Curran	def.	Ronnie Mann	Unanimous decision (29–28, 30–27, 30–27)	3	5:00	(Note: Featherweight semifinal.)
Featherweight	Marlon Sandro	def.	Nazareno Malegarie	Unanimous decision (30–27, 30–27, 30–27)	3	5:00	(Note: Featherweight semifinal.)
Lightweight	Chris Horodecki	def.	Chris Saunders	Unanimous decision (30–27, 30–27, 30–27)	3	5:00
Heavyweight	Neil Grove	def.	Zak Jensen	TKO (punches)	1	2:00
Local feature fights
Lightweight	Alexandre Bezerra	def.	Jesse Gross	Technical submission (rear-naked choke)	1	1:28	(Note: This bout aired on the MTV2 broadcast following the Horodecki vs. Saunders bout.)
Featherweight	William Romero	def.	Daniel Langbeen	Unanimous decision (29–28, 30–27, 30–27)	3	5:00
Lightweight	Alex Ricci	def.	Alka Matewa	TKO (elbows and punches)	2	2:40

== Bellator 48 ==
Bellator 48
- Promotion: Bellator Fighting Championships
- Date: August 20, 2011
- Venue: Mohegan Sun Arena
- City: (United States) Uncasville, Connecticut

Event chronology
Bellator 47	Bellator 48	Bellator 49

Bellator 48 was a mixed martial arts event held by Bellator Fighting Championships. The event took place on August 20, 2011, at the Mohegan Sun Arena in Uncasville, Connecticut. The card was part of Bellator's inaugural Summer Series and featured the final round fights in the Summer Series Tournament. The event was distributed live in prime time by MTV2.

=== Background ===
This event hosted the final round of an eight-man featherweight tournament that was held over the Summer Series.

John Clarke was expected to face Dan Cramer, but an injury forced Clarke out of the bout. Jeff "The Wolfman" Nader stepped in as Clarke's replacement.

The event drew an estimated 226,000 viewers on MTV2.

=== Results ===
Main card
Weight class				Method	Round	Time	Notes
Featherweight	Pat Curran	def.	Marlon Sandro	KO (head kick and punches)	2	4:00	(Note: Featherweight tournament final.)
Heavyweight	Cole Konrad	def.	Paul Buentello	Unanimous decision (30-27, 30-27, 29-28)	3	5:00
Catchweight (230 lb)	Seth Petruzelli	def.	Ricco Rodriguez	KO (punches)	1	4:21
Lightweight	Renê Nazare	def.	Juan Barrantes	TKO (doctor stoppage)	2	5:00
Local feature fights
Light Heavyweight	Jeff Nader	def.	Dan Cramer	TKO (punches)	3	1:04
Light Heavyweight	Nik Fekete	def.	Mark Griffin	TKO (elbows)	2	3:12
Lightweight	Andrew Calandrelli	def.	Matt Nice	Submission (keylock)	1	3:55
Welterweight	Ryan Quinn	def.	Brett Oteri	Technical submission (rear naked choke)	1	1:48	(Note: This bout aired on the MTV2 broadcast following the Rodriguez vs. Petruzelli bout.)
Featherweight	Saul Almeida	def.	Taketi Matsuda	Unanimous decision (30-27, 30-27, 29-28)	3	5:00

=== Featherweight tournament bracket ===
Quarterfinals
(United States)	Pat Curran	SUB
(Peru)	Luis Palomino	1
(England)	Ronnie Mann	KO
(United States)	Adam Schindler	1
(Brazil)	Marlon Sandro	SD
(Brazil)	Genair da Silva	3
(Argentina)	Nazareno Malegarie	SUB
(United States)	Jacob DeVree	3

Semifinals
(United States)	Pat Curran	UD
(England)	Ronnie Mann	3
(Brazil)	Marlon Sandro	UD
(Argentina)	Nazareno Malegarie	3

Finals
(United States)	Pat Curran	KO
(Brazil)	Marlon Sandro	2

== Bellator 49 ==
Bellator 49
- Promotion: Bellator Fighting Championships
- Date: September 10, 2011
- Venue: Caesars Atlantic City
- City: (United States) Atlantic City, New Jersey

Event chronology
Bellator 48	Bellator 49	Bellator 50

Bellator 49 was a mixed martial arts event held by Bellator Fighting Championships. The event took place on September 10, 2011, at Caesars Atlantic City in Atlantic City, New Jersey. The card was the debut of the promotion's fifth season and distributed live in prime time by MTV2.

=== Background ===
This event hosted the first round of an eight-man welterweight tournament to be held over the duration of Bellator's fifth season.

Rick Hawn was expected to face Ben Saunders at this event but Hawn was forced out of the bout due to a knee injury. Hawn was replaced by Bellator newcomer Chris Cisneros.

The Ultimate Fighter 12 competitor, Andy Main, was set to fight Kenny Foster on the undercard of this event. However, after an undisclosed injury, Main was pulled from the bout.

On September 6, 2011, it was announced Bellator's Season 5 "Local Feature Fights" would be streamed live on Spike.com, starting with this event.

The event drew an estimated 235,000 viewers on MTV2.

=== Results ===
Main card
Weight class				Method	Round	Time	Notes
Welterweight	Chris Lozano	def.	Brent Weedman	Unanimous decision (29-28, 29-28, 29-28)	3	5:00	(Note: Welterweight quarterfinal.)
Welterweight	Ben Saunders	def.	Chris Cisneros	TKO (knee to body and punches)	3	0:29	(Note: Welterweight quarterfinal.)
Welterweight	Luis Santos	def.	Dan Hornbuckle	Unanimous decision (30-27, 30-27, 30-27)	3	5:00	(Note: Welterweight quarterfinal.)
Welterweight	Douglas Lima	def.	Steve Carl	Unanimous decision (29-28, 30-27, 30-27)	3	5:00	(Note: Welterweight quarterfinal.)
Local feature fights (Spike.com)
Catchweight (147 lb)	Alexandre Bezerra	def.	Scott Heckman	TKO (punches)	2	1:38
Welterweight	Giedrius Karavackas	def.	LeVon Maynard	TKO (knee and punches)	3	1:32
Featherweight	Joel Roberts	def.	Brylan Van Artsdalen	Technical submission (triangle choke)	2	1:47
Catchweight (150 lb)	Lester Caslow	def.	James Jones	TKO (injury)	2	0:15
Heavyweight	Azunna Anyanwu	def.	J.A. Dudley	TKO (punches)	2	4:16

== Bellator 50 ==
Bellator 50
- Promotion: Bellator Fighting Championships
- Date: September 17, 2011
- Venue: Seminole Hard Rock Hotel & Casino
- City: (United States) Hollywood, Florida

Event chronology
Bellator 49	Bellator 50	Bellator 51

Bellator 50 was a mixed martial arts event held by Bellator Fighting Championships. The event took place on September 17, 2011, at the Seminole Hard Rock Hotel & Casino in Hollywood, Florida. The event was distributed live in prime time by MTV2.

=== Background ===
The event hosted the opening round of the middleweight tournament in Bellator's fifth season.

Veteran welterweight fighter Ailton Barbosa won Bellator's open tryouts in Hollywood, Florida in June 2011 to earn his spot on the card.

R.J. Goodridge was scheduled to fight J. P. Reese, but after suffering an undisclosed injury Goodridge pulled out of the bout and was replaced by Martin Brown. Also, Ryan Hodge was scheduled to fight Valdir Araujo, but was pulled from the bout with an injury, and replaced with Brett Cooper.

On September 15, 2011, Luis Palomino suffered an injury in training and was pulled from his scheduled bout with James Edson Berto. Berto was later pulled from the card as well, and the fight was scratched altogether; The two then met at W-1: Reloaded in which Palomino defeated Berto.

A scheduled lightweight bout between Dietter Navarro and Marcelo Goncalves was changed into a 156 lb catchweight bout after both fighters missed weight.

The event drew an estimated 114,000 viewers on MTV2.

=== Results ===
Main card
Weight class				Method	Round	Time	Notes
Middleweight	Bryan Baker	def.	Jared Hess	TKO (strikes)	3	2:52	(Note: Middleweight quarterfinal.)
Middleweight	Brian Rogers	def.	Victor O'Donnell	TKO (strikes)	1	1:56	(Note: Middleweight quarterfinal.)
Middleweight	Alexander Shlemenko	def.	Zelg Galesic	Submission (standing guillotine)	1	1:55	(Note: Middleweight quarterfinal.)
Middleweight	Vitor Vianna	def.	Sam Alvey	Split decision (29-28, 28-29, 29-28)	3	5:00	(Note: Middleweight quarterfinal.)
Local feature fights (Spike.com)
Catchweight (140 lb)	Shah Bobonis	def.	Marcos da Matta	KO (punch)	3	2:04
Catchweight (156 lb)	Marcelo Goncalves	def.	Dietter Navarro	Submission (armbar)	1	2:01
Middleweight	Brett Cooper	def.	Valdir Araujo	TKO (punches)	3	0:35
Lightweight	Rad Martinez	def.	Brian van Hoven	Unanimous decision (30-27, 30-27, 30-27)	3	5:00
Welterweight	Ailton Barbosa	def.	Ryan Keenan	Submission (rear-naked choke)	1	1:55
Welterweight	Cristiano Souza	def.	John Kelly	unanimous decision (29-28, 29-28, 29-28)	3	5:00
Lightweight	J.P. Reese	def.	Martin Brown	Unanimous decision (30-27, 30-27, 30-27)	3	5:00

== Bellator 51 ==
Bellator 51
- Promotion: Bellator Fighting Championships
- Date: September 24, 2011
- Venue: Canton Memorial Civic Center
- City: Canton, Ohio

Event chronology
Bellator 50	Bellator 51	Bellator 52

Bellator 51 was a mixed martial arts event held by Bellator Fighting Championships. The event took place on September 24, 2011, at the Canton Memorial Civic Center in Canton, Ohio. The event was distributed live in prime time by MTV2.

=== Background ===
This event hosted the first round of an eight-man bantamweight tournament to be held over the course of Bellator's fifth season.

Joe Soto was originally scheduled to face Eduardo Dantas in the opening round of the bantamweight-tournament. However, he was pulled from the bout after losing to Eddie Yagin at Tachi Palace Fights 10 and replaced by Wilson Reis.

The Jessica Eye-Casey Noland bout was changed from 125 lb to a 127 lb catchweight after Noland failed to make weight./

The event drew an estimated 158,000 viewers on MTV2.

=== Results ===
Main card
Weight class				Method	Round	Time	Notes
Bantamweight	Alexis Vila	def.	Joe Warren	KO (punch)	1	1:04	(Note: Bantamweight quarterfinal.)
Bantamweight	Eduardo Dantas	def.	Wilson Reis	KO (flying knee and punches)	2	1:02	(Note: Bantamweight quarterfinal.)
Bantamweight	Marcos Galvão	def.	Chase Beebe	Split decision (29-28, 28-29, 29-28)	3	5:00	(Note: Bantamweight quarterfinal.)
Bantamweight	Ed West	def.	Luis Nogueira	Unanimous decision (29-28, 29-28, 30-27)	3	5:00	(Note: Bantamweight quarterfinal.)
Local feature fights (Spike.com)
Featherweight	Frank Caraballo	def.	Dustin Kempf	TKO (Knee Injury)	1	1:19
Women's (127 lb)	Jessica Eye	def.	Casey Noland	Split decision (29–28, 28–29, 29–28)	3	5:00
Bantamweight	Jessie Riggleman	def.	Farkhad Sharipov	Split decision (29–28, 28–29, 30–27)	3	5:00
Light Heavyweight	Dan Spohn	def.	Dane Bonnigson	KO (knee)	1	0:09
Light Heavyweight	John Hawk	def.	Allan Weickert	TKO (retirement)	2	5:00
Lightweight	Joey Holt	def.	Clint Musser	KO (flying knee)	1	4:07

== Bellator 52 ==
Bellator 52
- Promotion: Bellator Fighting Championships
- Date: October 1, 2011
- Venue: L'Audberge du Lac Casino Resort
- City: Lake Charles, Louisiana

Event chronology
Bellator 51	Bellator 52	Bellator 53

Bellator 52 was a mixed martial arts event held by Bellator Fighting Championships. It took place on October 1, 2011, at the L'Auberge du Lac Casino Resort in Lake Charles, Louisiana, Louisiana. The event was distributed live in prime time by MTV2.

=== Background ===
This event hosted the opening round of Bellator's second heavyweight tournament.

Blagoy Ivanov was originally scheduled to face Thiago Santos. Santos, however, was unable to travel from Brazil for the event and was replaced by Zak Jensen.

The event drew an estimated 269,000 viewers on MTV 2.

=== Results ===
Main card
Weight class				Method	Round	Time	Notes
Heavyweight	Mike Hayes	def.	Neil Grove	Split decision (29-28, 28-29, 29-28)	3	5:00	(Note: Heavyweight quarterfinal.)
Heavyweight	Blagoy Ivanov	def.	Zak Jensen	Technical submission (guillotine choke)	2	2:35	(Note: Heavyweight quarterfinal.)
Heavyweight	Eric Prindle	def.	Abe Wagner	Unanimous decision (29-28, 29-28, 29-28)	3	5:00	(Note: Heavyweight quarterfinal.)
Heavyweight	Ron Sparks	def.	Mark Holata	KO (punches)	1	1:24	(Note: Heavyweight quarterfinal.)
Local feature fights (Spike.com)
Catchweight (150 lb)	Genair da Silva	def.	Bryan Goldsby	Submission (D'arce choke)	1	3:51
Lightweight	Josh Quayhagen	def.	Cosmo Alexandre	Unanimous decision (30-27, 30-27, 30-27)	3	5:00
Heavyweight	Justin Frazier	def.	Liron Wilson	TKO (punches)	1	1:50
Catchweight (213 lb)	Matt Van Buren	def.	Nick Nichols	TKO (punches)	2	2:29

== Bellator 53 ==
Bellator 53
- Promotion: Bellator Fighting Championships
- Date: October 8, 2011
- Venue: Buffalo Run Hotel & Casino
- City: Miami, Oklahoma

Event chronology
Bellator 52	Bellator 53	Bellator 54

Bellator 53 was a mixed martial arts event held by Bellator Fighting Championships. The event took place on October 8, 2011, at the Buffalo Run Hotel & Casino in Miami, Oklahoma. The event was distributed live in prime time by MTV2.

=== Background ===
This event hosted the second round of the Bellator Season 5 Welterweight Tournament.

The event drew an estimated 103,000 viewers on MTV2.

=== Results ===
Main card
Weight class				Method	Round	Time	Notes
Welterweight	Ben Saunders	def.	Luis Santos	Submission (americana)[83]	3	1:45	(Note: Welterweight semifinal.)
Welterweight	Douglas Lima	def.	Chris Lozano	KO (punch)	2	3:14	(Note: Welterweight semifinal.)
Featherweight	Ronnie Mann	def.	Kenny Foster	Submission (triangle choke)	1	3:51
Heavyweight	Thiago Santos	def.	Josh Burns	Submission (rear-naked choke)	1	2:23	(Note: Heavyweight tournament reserve bout.)
Local feature fights (Spike.com)
Catchweight (160 lb)	E.J. Brooks	def.	Greg Scott	TKO (punches)	2	2:40
Middleweight	Giva Santana	def.	Darryl Cobb	Submission (armbar)	1	2:00
Catchweight (175 lb)	A.J. Matthews	def.	Rudy Bears	Unanimous decision (29-28 29-28 29-28)	3	5:00
Light Heavyweight	Raphael Davis	def.	Myron Dennis	KO (punch)	2	0:29
Welterweight	David Rickels	def.	Levi Avera	Submission (triangle choke)	2	1:06
Catchweight (140 lb)	Luis Nogueira	def.	Zak Laird	Submission (guillotine choke)	1	0:51

== Bellator 54 ==
Bellator 54
- Promotion: Bellator Fighting Championships
- Date: October 15, 2011
- Venue: Boardwalk Hall
- City: (United States) Atlantic City, New Jersey

Event chronology
Bellator 53	Bellator 54	Bellator 52

Bellator 54 was a mixed martial arts event held by Bellator Fighting Championships. The event took place on October 15, 2011, at the Boardwalk Hall in Atlantic City, New Jersey. The event was distributed live in prime time by MTV2.

=== Background ===
Bellator bantamweight champion, Zach Makovsky, competed in a non-title bout at this event. He faced one-time UFC competitor Ryan Roberts.

This event hosted the second round of the Bellator Season 5 Middleweight Tournament.

Eddie Alvarez was scheduled to make his second title defense of his lightweight championship against Michael Chandler on this card; however, on September 20, it was announced that Alvarez suffered an injury and the match has been pushed back to Bellator 58.

Karl Amoussou was expected to make his welterweight debut at this event against Joey Kirwan. However, for unknown reasons, Amoussou was pulled from the bout and replaced by Lewis Rumsy.

=== Results ===
Main card
Weight class				Method	Round	Time	Notes
Middleweight	Alexander Shlemenko	def.	Brian Rogers	TKO (knees)	2	2:30	(Note: Middleweight semifinal.)
Middleweight	Vitor Vianna	def.	Bryan Baker	TKO (punches)	1	0:54	(Note: Middleweight semifinal.)
Bantamweight	Zach Makovsky	def.	Ryan Roberts	Submission (north/south choke)	1	4:48
Lightweight	Jacob Kirwan	def.	Renê Nazare	Unanimous decision (29-28, 30-27, 30-27)	3	5:00
Local feature fights (Spike.com)
Middleweight	Duane Bastress	def.	Daniel Gracie	TKO (doctor stoppage)	2	5:00
Light Heavyweight	Tim Carpenter	def.	Ryan Contaldi	TKO (punch)	1	2:16
Catchweight (187 lb)	Joey Kirwan	def.	Lewis Rumsey	Submission (guillotine choke)	1	1:40
Catchweight (140 lb)	Claudio Ledesma	def.	Brian Kelleher	Unanimous decision (30-27, 30-27, 30-27)	3	5:00
Women's (145 lb)	Andria Caplan	def.	Adrienne Seiber	Unanimous decision (29-28, 29-28, 29-28)	3	5:00

== Bellator 55 ==
Bellator 55
- Promotion: Bellator Fighting Championships
- Date: October 22, 2011
- Venue: Cocopah Resort and Casino
- City: (United States) Somerton, Arizona

Event chronology
Bellator 54	Bellator 55	Bellator 56

Bellator 55 was a mixed martial arts event held by Bellator Fighting Championships on October 22, 2011, at Cocopah Resort and Casino in Somerton, Arizona. The event was distributed live in prime time by MTV2.

=== Background ===
This event hosted the second round of Bellator's Season Five Bantamweight Tournament.

Bellator Light Heavyweight Champion Christian M'Pumbu fought Travis Wiuff in a non-title bout. M'Pumbu become the first Bellator champion to lose in a non-title bout.

Despite a close split decision loss, main eventer Marcos Galvão was awarded a "win" bonus.

The event earned an average of 168,000 viewers on MTV2.

=== Results ===
Main card
Weight class				Method	Round	Time	Notes
Bantamweight	Alexis Vila	def.	Marcos Galvão	Split decision (27-30, 29-28, 29-28)	3	5:00	(Note: Bantamweight semifinal.)
Bantamweight	Eduardo Dantas	def.	Ed West	Split decision (29-28, 28-29, 30-27)	3	5:00	(Note: Bantamweight semifinal.)
Light Heavyweight	Travis Wiuff	def.	Christian M'Pumbu	Unanimous decision (30-27, 29-28, 29-28)	3	5:00
Lightweight	Ricardo Tirloni	def.	Steve Gable	Submission (rear-naked choke)	2	3:54
Local feature fights (Spike.com)
Lightweight	Efraín Escudero	def.	Cesar Avila	Submission (guillotine choke)	1	1:55
Catchweight (210 lb)	Rich Hale	def.	Carlos Flores	TKO (punch)	1	0:18
Middleweight	Jacob Ortiz	def.	Edgar Garcia	KO (punch)	1	4:06
Catchweight (158 lb)	Erin Beach	def.	Roscoe Jackson	Submission (rear-naked choke)	1	3:52
Featherweight	Jade Porter	def.	Nick Piedmont	Unanimous decision (29-28, 30-27, 30-27)	3	5:00
Middleweight	Steve Steinbeiss	def.	Dano Moore	Submission (rear-naked choke)	1	4:52

== Bellator 56 ==
Bellator 56
- Promotion: Bellator Fighting Championships
- Date: October 29, 2011
- Venue: Memorial Hall
- City: (United States) Kansas City, Kansas

Event chronology
Bellator 55	Bellator 56	Bellator 57

Bellator 56 was a mixed martial arts event held by Bellator Fighting Championships. It took place on October 29, 2011, at Memorial Hall in Kansas City, Kansas. The event was distributed live in prime time by MTV2.

=== Background ===
This event hosted the second round of Bellator's second heavyweight tournament.

Mike Hayes was expected to face Blagoi Ivanov at this event, However Hayes was issued a 60-day medical suspension by the Louisiana Boxing and Wrestling Commission due to a fractured orbital bone sustained during his fight with Neil Grove at Bellator 52. Thiago Santos stepped in for the injured Hayes. Ivanov subsequently had to pull out of the bout due to an injury and was replaced by Neil Grove.

=== Results ===
Main card
Weight class				Method	Round	Time	Notes
Welterweight	Ben Askren (c)	def.	Jay Hieron	Split decision (47-48, 48-47, 48-47)	5	5:00	(Note: For the Bellator Welterweight Championship.)
Heavyweight	Thiago Santos	def.	Neil Grove	Submission (rear-naked choke)	1	0:38	(Note: Heavyweight semifinal.)
Heavyweight	Eric Prindle	def.	Ron Sparks	KO (Punch)	1	0:40	(Note: Heavyweight semifinal.)
Local Feature Fight (Spike.com)
Welterweight	Marcio Navarro	def.	Rudy Bears	Split decision (29-28, 27-30, 29-28)	3	5:00
Featherweight	Jeremy Spoon	def.	Adam Schindler	Unanimous decision	3	5:00	(Note: This bout aired on MTV2 following the Prindle/Sparks match.)
Light Heavyweight	Kelvin Tiller	def.	Dan Spohn	Split decision (30-27, 28-29, 29-28)	3	5:00
Lightweight	E.J. Brooks	def.	willian De Souza	Unanimous decision (29-27, 30-26, 30-26)	3	5:00
Featherweight	Jacob Akin	def.	Jeimeson Saudino	Submission (rear-naked choke)	1	3:26
Bantamweight	Aaron Ely	def.	Owen Evinger	Submission (rear-naked choke)	1	3:45
Heavyweight	Daniel Gallemore	def.	Derrick Ruffin	TKO (retirement)	2	5:00

== Bellator 57 ==
Bellator 57
- Promotion: Bellator Fighting Championships
- Date: November 12, 2011
- Venue: Casino Rama
- City: (Canada) Rama, Ontario

Event chronology
Bellator 56	Bellator 57	Bellator 58

Bellator 57 was a mixed martial arts event held by Bellator Fighting Championships. It took place on November 12, 2011, at Casino Rama in Rama, Ontario. The event was distributed live in primetime by MTV2.

=== Background ===
This was the second time that Bellator has come to Canada. Previously, Bellator 47 was also held in Rama, Ontario.

This event hosted the final rounds of Bellator's Season Five Welterweight Tournament and Bellator's Season Five Middleweight Tournament.

Bellator's Women's champion, Zoila Gurgel, was scheduled to compete in a non-title bout against Carina Damm. However, an injury forced her off the card.

=== Results ===
Main card
Weight class				Method	Round	Time	Notes
Welterweight	Douglas Lima	def.	Ben Saunders	KO (punches)	2	1:21	(Note: Welterweight tournament final.)
Middleweight	Alexander Shlemenko	def.	Vitor Vianna	Unanimous decision (30-27, 30-27, 29-28)	3	5:00	(Note: Middleweight tournament final.)
Light Heavyweight	Roger Hollett	def.	John Hawk	Split decision (29-28, 28-29, 29-28)	3	5:00
Featherweight	Alexandre Bezerra	def.	Doug Evans	Submission (ankle lock)	1	4:04
Local feature fights (Spike.com)
Light Heavyweight	Matt Van Buren	def.	Shawn Levesque	Submission (rear naked choke)	1	4:38
Lightweight	Chris Horodecki	vs.	Mike Corey	Majority draw (29-28 Horodecki, 28-28, 28-28)	3	5:00
Lightweight	Dave Jansen	def.	Ashkan Morvari	Submission (rear naked choke)	2	2:47
Bantamweight	Denis Puric	def.	Chuck Mady	TKO (injury-broken jaw)	2	5:00
Lightweight	Josh Shockley	def.	Eric Moon	Submission (guillotine)	1	0:35
Lightweight	Taylor Solomon	def.	Mike Sledzion	KO (punch)	1	1:10

== Bellator 58 ==
Bellator 58
- Promotion: Bellator Fighting Championships
- Date: November 19, 2011
- Venue: Seminole Hard Rock Hotel and Casino
- City: (United States) Hollywood, Florida

Event chronology
Bellator 57	Bellator 58	Bellator 59

Bellator 58 was a mixed martial arts event held by Bellator Fighting Championships. It took place on November 19, 2011, at Seminole Hard Rock Hotel and Casino in Hollywood, Florida. The event was distributed live in prime time by MTV2.

=== Background ===
Shooto's 183-pound South American champion, Carlos Alexandre Pereira, was expected to make his Bellator debut at this event.

Bellator Middleweight champion, Hector Lombard, was expected to compete in non-title, light heavyweight fight against UFC and Strikeforce veteran, Renato Sobral, at this event. However, for unknown reasons, Sobral was replaced by Trevor Prangley.

The event drew a season high 269,000 viewers with the immediate repeat also drawing 160,000 viewers.

=== Results ===
Main card
Weight class				Method	Round	Time	Notes
Lightweight	Michael Chandler	def.	Eddie Alvarez (c)	Submission (rear naked choke)	4	3:06	(Note: For the vacant Bellator Lightweight Championship.)
Catchweight (195 lb)	Hector Lombard	def.	Trevor Prangley	TKO (punches)	2	1:06
Women's (115 lb)	Jessica Aguilar	def.	Lisa Ellis	Unanimous decision (30-27, 30-27, 30-27)	3	5:00
Featherweight	Marlon Sandro	def.	Rafael Dias	Submission (arm-triangle choke)	1	3:56
Local feature fights (Spike.com)
Middleweight	Brett Cooper	def.	Jared Hess	Unanimous decision (29-28, 29-28, 29-28)	3	5:00
Welterweight	Valdir Araujo	def.	Ailton Barbosa	Unanimous decision (29-28, 29-28, 29-28)	3	5:00
Catchweight (157 lb)	Cosmo Alexandre	def.	Avery McPhatter	KO (knees)	1	0:20
Middleweight	Herbert Goodman	def.	Jonas Billstein	DQ (illegal soccer kick)	2	3:21
Lightweight	Fabio Mello	def.	Farkhad Sharipov	Unanimous decision (30-27, 30-27, 30-27)	3	5:00

== Bellator 59 ==
Bellator 59
- Promotion: Bellator Fighting Championships
- Date: November 26, 2011
- Venue: Caesars Atlantic City
- City: (United States) Atlantic City, New Jersey

Event chronology
Bellator 58	Bellator 59	Bellator 60

Bellator 59 was a mixed martial arts event held by Bellator Fighting Championships. It took place on November 26, 2011, at Caesars Atlantic City in Atlantic City, New Jersey. The event was distributed live in prime time by MTV2.

=== Background ===
This event hosted the final round of Bellator's Season Five Bantamweight Tournament as well as the Bellator's Season Five Heavyweight Tournament.

Michael Costa pulled out of his fight with Lyman Good due to an injury, which led the organization to scrap Good from the event all together. The lightweight bout between Phillipe Nover and Marcin Held was promoted to the main card.

The final of the Heavyweight tournament was ruled a No Contest after an accidental groin kick by Thiago Santos rendered Eric Prindle unable to continue. Following the event Santos failed to make weight for a scheduled rematch causing the bout to be cancelled, and Prindle to be awarded the tournament win by default.

=== Results ===
Main card
Weight class				Method	Round	Time	Notes
Heavyweight	Eric Prindle	vs.	Thiago Santos	No contest (kick to groin)	1	1:24	(Note: Heavyweight tournament final. The bout was ruled a No Contest after Santos kicked Prindle in the groin.)
Lightweight	Patricky Freire	def.	Kurt Pellegrino	TKO (punches)	1	0:50
Bantamweight	Eduardo Dantas	def.	Alexis Vila	Unanimous decision (29-28, 29-28, 29-28)	3	5:00	(Note: Bantamweight tournament final.)
Lightweight	Marcin Held	def.	Phillipe Nover	Split decision (29-28, 28-29, 29-28)	3	5:00
Local feature fights
Catchweight (175 lb)	Karl Amoussou	def.	Jesus Martinez	TKO (punches)	1	2:20
Welterweight	LeVon Maynard	def.	Christopher Wing	Unanimous decision (30-27, 30-27, 30-26)	3	5:00
Catchweight (175 lb)	Lucas Pimenta	def.	Doug Gordon	KO (elbows)	1	0:40
Featherweight	Scott Heckman	def.	Brylan Van Artsdalen	Submission (standing modified guillotine)	1	1:38
Middleweight	Gregory Milliard	def.	Brandon Saling	Unanimous decision (30-27, 30-27, 30-27)	3	5:00

== Tournaments ==
=== Heavyweight tournament bracket ===
Quarterfinals
(United States)	Eric Prindle	UD
(United States)	Abe Wagner	3
(United States)	Ron Sparks	KO
(United States)	Mark Holata	1
(United States)	Mike Hayes	SD
(South Africa)	Neil Grove	3
(Bulgaria)	Blagoy Ivanov	SUB
(United States)	Zak Jensen	2

Semifinals
(United States)	Eric Prindle	KO
(United States)	Ron Sparks	1
(Brazil)	Thiago Santos	SUB
(South Africa)	Neil Grove	1

Finals
(United States)	Eric Prindle	D/Q
(Brazil)	Thiago Santos	N/A

1: Thiago Santos replaced Mike Hayes after Hayes was forced out due to a broke orbital bone. He defeated Josh Burns at Bellator 53 to earn the reserve spot.
2: Neil Grove was brought back into the tournament, replacing Blagoi Ivanov, after Ivanov was forced out due to an unspecified injury.
3: The final was officially ruled a No Contest after Santos kicked Prindle in the groin and Prindle was unable to continue.
4: Prindle was awarded the tournament title after Santos missed weight for the rematch.

=== Middleweight tournament bracket ===
Quarterfinals
(Russia)	Alexander Shlemenko	SUB
(Croatia)	Zelg Galesic	1
(United States)	Brian Rogers	TKO
(United States)	Victor O'Donnell	1
(Brazil)	Vitor Vianna	SD
(United States)	Sam Alvey	3
(United States)	Bryan Baker	TKO
(United States)	Jared Hess	3

Semifinals
(Russia)	Alexander Shlemenko	TKO
(United States)	Brian Rogers	2
(Brazil)	Vitor Vianna	TKO
(United States)	Bryan Baker	1

Finals
(Russia)	Alexander Shlemenko	UD
(Brazil)	Vitor Vianna	3

=== Welterweight tournament bracket ===
Quarterfinals
(Brazil)	Douglas Lima	UD
(United States)	Steve Carl	3
(United States)	Chris Lozano	UD
(United States)	Brent Weedman	3
(United States)	Ben Saunders	TKO
(United States)	Chris Cisneros	3
(Brazil)	Luis Santos	UD
(United States)	Dan Hornbuckle	3

Semifinals
(Brazil)	Douglas Lima	KO
(United States)	Chris Lozano	2
(United States)	Ben Saunders	SUB
(Brazil)	Luis Santos	3

Finals
(Brazil)	Douglas Lima	KO
(United States)	Ben Saunders	2

=== Bantamweight tournament bracket ===
Quarterfinals
(Brazil)	Eduardo Dantas	TKO
(Brazil)	Wilson Reis	2
(United States)	Ed West	UD
(Brazil)	Luis Nogueira	3
(Cuba)	Alexis Vila	KO
(United States)	Joe Warren	1
(Brazil)	Marcos Galvao	SD
(United States)	Chase Beebe	3

Semifinals
(Brazil)	Eduardo Dantas	SD
(United States)	Ed West	3
(Cuba)	Alexis Vila	SD
(Brazil)	Marcos Galvao	3

Finals
(Brazil)	Eduardo Dantas	UD
(Cuba)	Alexis Vila	3
