= 2010 in Bellator MMA =

Mixed martial arts events

Information
- Promotion: Bellator MMA
- First date aired: April 8, 2010
- Last date aired: October 28, 2010

2010 in Bellator MMA was the second installment of the Bellator Fighting Championships (Bellator FC)-produced series. It started on April 8, 2010, and ended on June 24, 2010. Tournaments were held in the featherweight, lightweight, welterweight and middleweight divisions. The winner of each tournament will get a shot at the current Bellator Champion in his respective weight class. Three of the four current Bellator Champions also fought during this season in "Super Fights". These non-tournament, non-title catch-weight fights were to help prepare the champions in defending their titles against the winners of this season's tournaments sometime in the third season.

== Bellator 13 ==
Bellator 13
- Promotion: Bellator Fighting Championships
- Date: April 8, 2010
- Venue: Seminole Hard Rock Hotel & Casino
- City: Hollywood, Florida, United States

Event chronology
| Bellator 12 | Bellator 13 | Bellator 14 |

Bellator 13 was a mixed martial arts event by Bellator Fighting Championships. The event took place on Thursday, April 8, 2010, at the Seminole Hard Rock Hotel & Casino in Hollywood, Florida.

Background

The card featured two quarter-final bouts of the Featherweight and Lightweight tournaments Bellator is holding in its second season. The event was distributed live in prime time by FOX Sports Net and its regional sports network affiliates.

Janne Tulirinta was originally set to fight Carey Vanier, however, Tulirinta was forced out of the bout because of visa issues. Joe Duarte was his replacement.

Results

Main card
| Weight class | | | | Method | Round | Time | Notes |
|---|---|---|---|---|---|---|---|
| Lightweight | Roger Huerta | def. | Chad Hinton | Submission (kneebar) | 3 | 0:56 | (Note: Lightweight Quarterfinal Tournament Bout) |
| Featherweight | Joe Warren | def. | Eric Marriott | Decision (unanimous) (30–27, 30–27, 30–27) | 3 | 5:00 | (Note: Featherweight Quarterfinal Tournament bout) |
| Lightweight | Carey Vanier | def. | Joe Duarte | TKO (punches) | 3 | 4:14 | (Note: Lightweight Quarterfinal Tournament Bout) |
| Featherweight | Georgi Karakhanyan | def. | Bao Quach | KO (knee) | 1 | 4:05 | (Note: Featherweight Quarterfinal Tournament bout) |
Local feature fights
| Welterweight | Vagner Rocha | def. | Francisco Soares | TKO (punches) | 2 | 2:07 |
| Catchweight (172 lbs) | Edson Diniz | def. | John Kelly | Submission (kneebar) | 1 | 4:36 |
| Catchweight (140 lbs) | Chris Manuel | def. | Ralph Acosta | Submission (guillotine choke) | 3 | 0:35 |
| Catchweight (187 lb) | Mikey Gomez | def. | Moyses Gabin | Decision (unanimous) (29–28, 29–28, 29–28) | 3 | 5:00 |

== Bellator 14 ==
Bellator 14
- Promotion: Bellator Fighting Championships
- Date: April 15, 2010
- Venue: Chicago Theatre
- City: Chicago, Illinois, United States

Event chronology
| Bellator 13 | Bellator 14 | Bellator 15 |

Bellator 14 was a mixed martial arts event by Bellator Fighting Championships. The event took place on Thursday, April 15, 2010, at the Chicago Theatre in Chicago, Illinois.

Background

The card featured the quarter-final bouts in three of the four tournaments Bellator is holding in its second season. The event was distributed live in prime time by FOX Sports Net and its regional sports network affiliates.

Originally, Imada was set to fight Ferrid Kheder at Bellator 15 but an injury forced Kheder out of the bout. James Krause was tapped as Kheder's replacement and the bout was moved to this event. To make room, a featherweight tournament bout between Patricio Freire and William Romero was moved to Bellator 15.

A bout between Jonatas Novaes and Daniel Mason-Straus was canceled due to an undisclosed illness.

Results

Main card
| Weight class | | | | Method | Round | Time | Notes |
|---|---|---|---|---|---|---|---|
| Lightweight | Toby Imada | def. | James Krause | Submission (armbar) | 2 | 2:44 | (Note: Lightweight Quarterfinal Tournament bout) |
| Welterweight | Ben Askren | def. | Ryan Thomas | Submission (guillotine choke) | 1 | 2:40 | (Note: Welterweight Quarterfinal Tournament bout) |
| Featherweight | Wilson Reis | def. | Shad Lierley | Submission (rear-naked choke) | 3 | 3:33 | (Note: Featherweight Quarterfinal Tournament Bout) |
| Lightweight | Pat Curran | def. | Mike Ricci | KO (punches) | 1 | 3:01 | (Note: Lightweight Quarterfinal Tournament Bout) |
Local feature fights
| Catchweight (141 lbs) | Bryan Goldsby | def. | Jeff Curran | Decision (unanimous) (29–28, 29–28, 29–28) | 3 | 5:00 | (Note: For a spot in Bellator's Season Three Bantamweight Tournament) |
| Women's bout | Felice Herrig | def. | Jessica Rakoczy | Decision (split) (29–28, 29–28, 28–29) | 3 | 5:00 |
| Middleweight | Louis Taylor | def. | Ryan Sturdy | KO (head kick) | 1 | 1:08 |

== Bellator 15 ==
Bellator 15
- Promotion: Bellator Fighting Championships
- Date: April 22, 2010
- Venue: Mohegan Sun Arena
- City: Uncasville, Connecticut, United States

Event chronology
| Bellator 14 | Bellator 15 | Bellator 16 |

Bellator 15 was a mixed martial arts event held by Bellator Fighting Championships. The event took take place on Thursday, April 22, 2010, in Uncasville, Connecticut. The event was distributed live in prime time by FOX Sports Net and its regional sports network affiliates.

Background

The card featured quarter-final bouts in the Welterweight and Featherweight tournaments Bellator is holding in its second season.

Dan Hornbuckle was originally set to fight Sean Pierson, but a back injury forced Pierson out of the bout. Tyler Stinson was his replacement.

Jim Wallhead was forced out of his bout with Jacob McClintock due to air travel not being available in England. Ryan Thomas was Wallhead's replacement.

Results

Main card
| Weight class | | | | Method | Round | Time | Notes |
|---|---|---|---|---|---|---|---|
| Welterweight | Steve Carl | def. | Brett Cooper | Decision (split) (28–29, 29–28, 29–28) | 3 | 5:00 | (Note: Welterweight Quarterfinal Tournament Bout) |
| Welterweight | Dan Hornbuckle | def. | Tyler Stinson | Submission (triangle choke) | 1 | 2:03 | (Note: Welterweight Quarterfinal Tournament Bout) |
| Welterweight | Ryan Thomas | def. | Jacob McClintock | TKO (punches) | 1 | 4:11 | (Note: Welterweight Quarterfinal Tournament Bout) |
| Featherweight | Patricio Freire | def. | William Romero | Submission (heel hook) | 1 | 2:01 | (Note: Featherweight Quarterfinal Tournament Bout) |
Local feature fights
| Catchweight (190 lb) | David Branch | def. | Derrick Mehmen | Submission (rear-naked choke) | 2 | 0:26 |
| Welterweight | Ryan Quinn | def. | Matt Lee | Decision (unanimous) (29–28, 29–28, 28–27) | 3 | 5:00 |
| Middleweight | Dan Cramer | def. | Dennis Olson | Decision (unanimous) (30–27, 30–27, 30–27) | 3 | 5:00 |
| Featherweight | Rich De Los Reyes | def. | Brylan Van Artsdalen | Submission (rear-naked choke) | 2 | 2:03 |

== Bellator 16 ==
Bellator 16
- Promotion: Bellator Fighting Championships
- Date: April 29, 2010
- Venue: Kansas City Power & Light District
- City: Kansas City, Missouri, United States
- Attendance: 2,000–2,500

Event chronology
| Bellator 15 | Bellator 16 | Bellator 17 |

Bellator 16 was a mixed martial arts event by Bellator Fighting Championships. The event took place on Thursday, April 29, 2010, in Kansas City, Missouri. The event was distributed live in prime time by FOX Sports Net and its regional sports network affiliates.

Background

The card featured the quarter-final bouts of the Middleweight Tournament Bellator is holding in its second season.

Eric Schambari was originally set to fight Matt Major, but Major instead fought Alexander Shlemenko and Schambari fought Luke Zachrich.

Rudy Bears was first set to fight Zak Cummings, however due to undisclosed reasons, Cummings pulled out of the fight and was replaced by Brent Weedman.

Results

Main card
| Weight class | | | | Method | Round | Time | Notes |
|---|---|---|---|---|---|---|---|
| Middleweight | Jared Hess | def. | Ryan McGivern | Submission (guillotine choke) | 2 | 1:54 | (Note: Middleweight Quarterfinal Tournament Bout) |
| Middleweight | Bryan Baker | def. | Sean Loeffler | TKO (punches) | 1 | 2:43 | (Note: Middleweight Quarterfinal Tournament Bout) |
| Middleweight | Alexander Shlemenko | def. | Matt Major | Decision (unanimous) (30–27, 30–27, 30–27) | 3 | 5:00 | (Note: Middleweight Quarterfinal Tournament Bout) |
| Middleweight | Eric Schambari | def. | Luke Zachrich | Submission (arm-triangle choke) | 1 | 3:04 | (Note: Middleweight Quarterfinal Tournament Bout) |
Local feature fights
| Catchweight (173 lbs) | Brent Weedman | def. | Rudy Bears | TKO (punches) | 1 | 4:19 |
| Bantamweight | Danny Tims | def. | Brian Davidson | Decision (unanimous) (29–28, 29–28, 30–27) | 3 | 5:00 | (Note: For a spot in Bellator's Season Three Bantamweight Tournament) |
| Catchweight (161 lbs) | Eric Marriott | def. | Demi Deeds | Submission (triangle choke) | 2 | 3:02 |
| Lightweight | Drew Dober | def. | Nick Nolte | Submission (arm-triangle choke) | 1 | 4:45 |

== Bellator 17 ==
Bellator 17
- Promotion: Bellator Fighting Championships
- Date: May 6, 2010
- Venue: Citi Performing Arts Center: Wang Theatre
- City: Boston, Massachusetts, United States
- Attendance: 1,000

Event chronology
| Bellator 16 | Bellator 17 | Bellator 18 |

Bellator 17 was a mixed martial arts event by Bellator Fighting Championships. The event took place on Thursday, May 6, 2010, at the Citi Performing Arts Center: Wang Theatre in Boston, Massachusetts. The event was distributed live in prime time by FOX Sports Net and its regional sports network affiliates.

Results

Main card
| Weight class | | | | Method | Round | Time | Notes |
|---|---|---|---|---|---|---|---|
| Catchweight (160 lb) | Eddie Alvarez | def. | Josh Neer | Submission (rear-naked choke) | 2 | 2:08 |
| Lightweight | Pat Curran | def. | Roger Huerta | Decision (unanimous) (29–28, 29–28, 29–28) | 3 | 5:00 | (Note: Lightweight Semifinal Tournament Bout) |
| Lightweight | Toby Imada | def. | Carey Vanier | Submission (armbar) | 2 | 3:33 | (Note: Lightweight Semifinal Tournament Bout) |
| Heavyweight | Cole Konrad | def. | Pat Bennett | Decision (unanimous) (30–26, 29–28, 30–27) | 3 | 5:00 | (Note: For a spot in Bellator's Season Three Heavyweight Tournament) |
Local feature fights
| Catchweight (187 lb) | Justin Torrey | def. | Lance Everson | TKO (strikes) | 2 | 3:55 |
| Catchweight (188 lbs) | Greg Rebello | def. | John Doyle | Decision (unanimous) (29–27, 29–27, 29–27) | 3 | 5:00 |
| Featherweight | Josh LaBerge | def. | Dan Bonnell | TKO (punches) | 1 | 0:48 |
| Catchweight (172 lb) | Chuck O'Neil | def. | Damian Vitale | TKO (cut) | 3 | 1:02 |

== Bellator 18 ==
Bellator 18
- Promotion: Bellator Fighting Championships
- Date: May 13, 2010
- Venue: Monroe Civic Center
- City: Monroe, Louisiana, United States

Event chronology
| Bellator 17 | Bellator 18 | Bellator 19 |

Bellator 18 was a mixed martial arts event by Bellator Fighting Championships. The event took place on Thursday, May 13, 2010, in Monroe, Louisiana. The event was distributed live in prime time by FOX Sports Net and its regional sports network affiliates.

Background

This event featured two semi-final match ups from Bellator's season two tournament as well as four additional preliminary card fights featuring local fighters.

Hector Lombard was scheduled to face former WEC Middleweight champion Paulo Filho in a non-title bout, but Filho pulled out of the bout and was replaced by Jay Silva. This marks the fourth bout Filho has pulled out of in two years.

Results

Main card
| Weight class | | | | Method | Round | Time | Notes |
|---|---|---|---|---|---|---|---|
| Catchweight (195 lb) | Hector Lombard | def. | Jay Silva | KO (punches) | 1 | 0:06 |
| Featherweight | Patricio Freire | def. | Wilson Reis | Decision (unanimous) (29–28, 29–28, 29–28) | 3 | 5:00 | (Note: Featherweight Semifinal Tournament Bout) |
| Featherweight | Joe Warren | def. | Georgi Karakhanyan | Decision (unanimous) (30–27, 30–27, 30–27) | 3 | 5:00 | (Note: Featherweight Semifinal Tournament Bout) |
Local feature fights
| Light Heavyweight | Bill Albrecht | def. | Jason Anderson | Submission (armbar) | 1 | 0:36 |
| Middleweight | Lamont Stafford | def. | Jules Bruchez | KO (punches) | 2 | 0:19 |
| Heavyweight | Shawn Jordan | def. | Douglas Williams | TKO (punches) | 1 | 0:19 |
| Catchweight (147 lbs) | Brock Kerry | def. | Mike Braswell | TKO (punches) | 1 | 3:20 |
| Catchweight (179 lbs) | Charlie Rader | def. | Christian Fulgium | TKO (punches) | 1 | 3:27 |

== Bellator 19 ==
Bellator 19
- Promotion: Bellator Fighting Championships
- Date: May 20, 2010
- Venue: Verizon Theater
- City: Grand Prairie, Texas, United States

Event chronology
| Bellator 18 | Bellator 19 | Bellator 20 |

Bellator 19 was a mixed martial arts event by Bellator Fighting Championships. The event took place on Thursday, May 20, 2010, at Verizon Theater in Grand Prairie, Texas. The event was distributed live in prime time by FOX Sports Net and its regional sports network affiliates.

Results

Main card
| Weight class | | | | Method | Round | Time | Notes |
|---|---|---|---|---|---|---|---|
| Featherweight | Joe Soto | def. | Diego Saraiva | TKO (doctor stoppage) | 1 | 5:00 |
| Welterweight | Ben Askren | def. | Ryan Thomas | Decision (unanimous) (30–27, 30–27, 30–27) | 3 | 5:00 | (Note: Welterweight Semifinal Tournament Bout) |
| Welterweight | Dan Hornbuckle | def. | Steve Carl | Submission (kimura) | 1 | 2:31 | (Note: Welterweight Semifinal Tournament Bout) |
Local feature fights
| Bantamweight | Johnny Bedford | def. | Jared Lopez | TKO (strikes) | 3 | 2:16 |
| Heavyweight | Scott Barrett | def. | Ty Lee | TKO (punches) | 1 | 2:25 | (Note: For a spot in Bellator's Season Three Heavyweight Tournament) |
| Welterweight | Joe Christopher | def. | Brandon McDowell | Submission (guillotine choke) | 1 | 1:36 |
| Featherweight | Chas Skelly | def. | Daniel Pineda | Submission (kneebar) | 2 | 2:16 |
| Middleweight | Josh Smith | def. | Donyiell Winrow | Decision (unanimous) (30–27, 30–27, 30–27) | 3 | 5:00 |
| Bantamweight | Doug Frey | def. | Aaron Wise | Submission (guillotine choke) | 1 | 0:49 |

== Bellator 20 ==
Bellator 20
- Promotion: Bellator Fighting Championships
- Date: May 27, 2010
- Venue: Majestic Theatre
- City: San Antonio, Texas, United States
- Attendance: 1,000

Event chronology
| Bellator 19 | Bellator 20 | Bellator 21 |

Bellator 20 was a mixed martial arts event by Bellator Fighting Championships. The event took place on Thursday, May 27, 2010, at the Majestic Theatre in San Antonio, Texas. The event was distributed live in prime time by FOX Sports Net and its regional sports network affiliates.

Background

The bout between Eddie Sanchez and Wayne Cole was reported to be for a spot in Bellator's season three Heavyweight tournament. However, Cole pulled out of the fight and was replaced by Marcus Sursa.

Two of the match ups became catchweight bouts after Brian Melancon and Andrew Chappelle failed to make weight.

Results

Main card
| Weight class | | | | Method | Round | Time | Notes |
|---|---|---|---|---|---|---|---|
| Middleweight | Bryan Baker | def. | Eric Schambari | Submission (triangle choke) | 1 | 2:29 | (Note: Middleweight Semifinal Tournament Bout) |
| Middleweight | Alexander Shlemenko | def. | Jared Hess | TKO (knee injury) | 3 | 2:20 | (Note: Middleweight Semifinal Tournament Bout) |
| Heavyweight | Eddie Sanchez | def. | Marcus Sursa | TKO (punches) | 3 | 0:23 | (Note: For a spot in Bellator's Season Three Heavyweight Tournament) |
Local feature fights
| Flyweight | Jimmy Flick | def. | Humberto DeLeon | Decision (unanimous) (30–27, 29–28, 29–28) | 3 | 5:00 |
| Bantamweight | Nick Mamalis | def. | Mark Oshiro | Submission (rear-naked choke) | 2 | 1:29 |
| Catchweight (175 lb) | Andrew Chappelle | def. | Cedric Marks | Submission (rear-naked choke) | 2 | 3:18 |
| Lightweight | Fernando Rodriguez | def. | Kenneth Battle | Submission (rear-naked choke) | 2 | 1:28 |
| Catchweight (161 lb) | Adam Schindler | def. | Brian Melancon | Decision (unanimous) | 3 | 5:00 |
| Light Heavyweight | Aaron Rosa | def. | Robert Villegas | Decision (unanimous) | 3 | 5:00 |

== Bellator 21 ==
Bellator 21
- Promotion: Bellator Fighting Championships
- Date: June 10, 2010
- Venue: Seminole Hard Rock Hotel & Casino
- City: Hollywood, Florida, United States

Event chronology
| Bellator 20 | Bellator 21 | Bellator 22 |

Bellator 21 was a mixed martial arts event held by Bellator Fighting Championships. The event took place on Thursday, June 10, 2010, at Seminole Hard Rock Hotel & Casino in Hollywood, Florida. The event was distributed live in prime time by FOX Sports Net and its regional sports network affiliates.

Background

The card featured the final tournament fight in the Lightweight division. The winner was crowned the Bellator season 2 Lightweight winner and would face the current Bellator Lightweight Champion Eddie Alvarez sometime during season 3.

Results

Main card
| Weight class | | | | Method | Round | Time | Notes |
|---|---|---|---|---|---|---|---|
| Lightweight | Pat Curran | def. | Toby Imada | Decision (split) (29–28, 28–29, 29–28) | 3 | 5:00 | (Note: Lightweight Final Tournament bout) |
| Women's (120 lb) | Megumi Fujii | def. | Sarah Schneider | TKO (punches) | 3 | 1:58 | (Note: For a spot in Bellator's Season Three Women's Tournament) |
| Heavyweight | Mike Hayes | def. | Steven Banks | Decision (unanimous) (29–28, 29–28, 29–28) | 3 | 5:00 | (Note: For a spot in Bellator's Season Three Heavyweight Tournament) |
Local feature fights
| Lightweight | Luis Palomino | def. | Jose Figueroa | Decision (unanimous) (29–28, 29–28, 29–28) | 3 | 5:00 |
| Catchweight (137 lbs) | Zach Makovsky | def. | Eric Luke | Submission (kimura) | 2 | 4:28 | (Note: For a spot in Bellator's Season Three Bantamweight Tournament) |
| Catchweight bout (175 lb) | Frank Carrillo | def. | Sabah Homasi | TKO (elbows) | 3 | 3:16 |
| Middleweight | Moyses Gabin | def. | Chris Boffil | Submission (rear-naked choke) | 1 | 4:41 |
| Bantamweight | Brian Eckstein | def. | Mitchell Chamale | Decision (unanimous) (30–27, 30–27, 30–27) | 3 | 5:00 |

== Bellator 22 ==
Bellator 22
- Promotion: Bellator Fighting Championships
- Date: June 17, 2010
- Venue: Kansas City Power & Light District
- City: Kansas City, Missouri, United States

Event chronology
| Bellator 21 | Bellator 22 | Bellator 23 |

Bellator 22 was a mixed martial arts event held by Bellator Fighting Championships. The event took place on Thursday, June 17, 2010, at Kansas City Power & Light District in Kansas City, Missouri. The event was distributed live in prime time by FOX Sports Net and its regional sports network affiliates.

Background

The card featured the final tournament fight in the Welterweight division. The winner was crowned the Bellator season 2 Welterweight winner and would face the current Bellator Welterweight Champion Lyman Good sometime during season three.

Results

Main card
| Weight class | | | | Method | Round | Time | Notes |
|---|---|---|---|---|---|---|---|
| Welterweight | Ben Askren | def. | Dan Hornbuckle | Decision (unanimous) (30–27, 30–27, 30–27) | 3 | 5:00 | (Note: Welterweight Final Tournament Bout) |
| Catchweight (140 lbs) | Jose Vega | def. | Jarrod Card | KO (punch) | 1 | 0:39 | (Note: For a spot in Bellator's Season Three Bantamweight Tournament) |
| Women's 115-pound | Lisa Ward | def. | Stephanie Frausto | Technical Submission (rear-naked choke) | 1 | 2:01 | (Note: For a spot in Bellator's Season Three Women's Tournament) |
| Light Heavyweight | Raphael Davis | def. | Demetrius Richards | Submission (strikes) | 1 | 2:51 |
Local feature fights
| Welterweight | Tyler Stinson | def. | Leonardo Pecanha | Submission (rear-naked choke) | 1 | 1:42 |
| Catchweight (180 lbs) | Rudy Bears | def. | Brian Green | Submission (rear-naked choke) | 1 | 3:29 |
| Bantamweight | Jared Downing | def. | Chad Vandenberg | Submission (rear-naked choke) | 3 | 1:35 |
| Heavyweight | Cole Konrad | def. | John Orr | Decision (unanimous) (30–27, 30–27, 30–27) | 3 | 5:00 |

== Bellator 23 ==
Bellator 23
- Promotion: Bellator Fighting Championships
- Date: June 24, 2010
- Venue: Fourth Street Live!
- City: Louisville, Kentucky, United States

Event chronology
| Bellator 22 | Bellator 23 | Bellator 24 |

Bellator 23 was a mixed martial arts event held by Bellator Fighting Championships. The event took place on Thursday, June 24, 2010, at Fourth Street Live! in Louisville, Kentucky. The event was distributed live in primetime by FOX Sports Net and its regional sports network affiliates.

Background

The card featured the final tournament fight in the Featherweight and Middleweight divisions. The winners were crowned the Bellator Season 2 Featherweight and Middleweight winners and would face the current Bellator Featherweight and Middleweight Champions, Joe Soto and Hector Lombard, respectively, sometime during season 3.

Luke Zachrich was originally set to compete in a middleweight bout against Mike Fleniken. However, Zachrich was forced to pull out of the fight for an undisclosed reason. He was replaced by UFC veteran, Johnny Rees. However, Rees was then replaced by Stoney Hale.

Kurt Kinser agreed to catchweight contest after Dave Overfield weighed-in well-over the 155-pound lightweight limit.

Results

Main card
| Weight class | | | | Method | Round | Time | Notes |
|---|---|---|---|---|---|---|---|
| Featherweight | Joe Warren | def. | Patricio Freire | Decision (split) (29–28, 28–29, 29–28) | 3 | 5:00 | (Note: Featherweight Final Tournament Bout) |
| Middleweight | Alexander Shlemenko | def. | Bryan Baker | TKO (punches) | 1 | 2:45 | (Note: Middleweight Final Tournament Bout) |
| Bantamweight | Nick Mamalis | def. | Albert Rios | TKO (punches) | 1 | 4:40 | (Note: For a spot in Bellator's Season Three Bantamweight Tournament) |
| Women's (121 lb) | Zoila Frausto Gurgel | def. | Rosi Sexton | KO (knee and punches) | 1 | 2:00 | (Note: For a spot in Bellator's Season Three Women's Tournament) |
Local feature fights
| Welterweight | Brent Weedman | def. | John Troyer | Submission (armbar) | 1 | 4:55 |
| Lightweight | Daniel Mason-Straus | def. | Chad Hinton | Decision (unanimous) | 3 | 5:00 |
| Catchweight (160 lb) | Kurt Kinser | def. | Dave Overfield | TKO (punches) | 1 | 2:30 |
| Middleweight | Stoney Hale | def. | Mike Fleniken | Submission (rear-naked choke) | 2 | 4:20 |

== Tournaments ==
=== Middleweight Tournament bracket ===
Quarterfinals
(Russia) | Alexander Shlemenko | UD
(United States) | Matt Major | 3
(United States) | Jared Hess | SUB
(United States) | Ryan McGivern | 2
(United States) | Bryan Baker | TKO
(United States) | Sean Loeffler | 1
(United States) | Eric Schambari | SUB
(United States) | Luke Zachrich | 1

Semifinals
(Russia) | Alexander Shlemenko | TKO
(United States) | Jared Hess | 3
(United States) | Bryan Baker | SUB
(United States) | Eric Schambari | 1

Finals
(Russia) | Alexander Shlemenko | TKO
(United States) | Bryan Baker | 1

=== Welterweight Tournament bracket ===
Quarterfinals
(United States) | Ben Askren | SUB
(United States) | Ryan Thomas | 1
(United States) | Ryan Thomas | TKO
(United States) | Jacob McClintock | 1
(United States) | Dan Hornbuckle | SUB
(United States) | Tyler Stinson | 1
(United States) | Steve Carl | SD
(United States) | Brett Cooper | 3

Semifinals
(United States) | Ben Askren | UD
(United States) | Ryan Thomas | 3
(United States) | Dan Hornbuckle | SUB
(United States) | Steve Carl | 1

Finals
(United States) | Ben Askren | UD
(United States) | Dan Hornbuckle | 3

1: Ryan Thomas replaced Jim Wallhead
2: Tyler Stinson replaced Sean Pierson

=== Lightweight Tournament bracket ===
Quarterfinals
(United States) | Pat Curran | KO
(Canada) | Mike Ricci | 1
(United States) | Roger Huerta | SUB
(United States) | Chad Hinton | 3
(United States) | Toby Imada | SUB
(United States) | James Krause | 2
(United States) | Carey Vanier | TKO
(Guam) | Joe Duarte | 3

Semifinals
(United States) | Pat Curran | UD
(United States) | Roger Huerta | 3
(United States) | Toby Imada | SUB
(United States) | Carey Vanier | 2

Finals
(United States) | Pat Curran | SD
(United States) | Toby Imada | 3

1: James Krause replaced Ferrid Kheder
2: Joe Duarte replaced Janne Tulirinta

=== Featherweight Tournament bracket ===
Quarterfinals
(United States) | Joe Warren | UD
(United States) | Eric Marriott | 3
(Armenia) | Georgi Karakhanyan | KO
(United States) | Bao Quach | 1
(Brazil) | Patricio Freire | SUB
(Canada) | William Romero | 1
(Brazil) | Wilson Reis | SUB
(United States) | Shad Lierley | 3

Semifinals
(United States) | Joe Warren | UD
(Armenia) | Georgi Karakhanyan | 3
(Brazil) | Patricio Freire | UD
(Brazil) | Wilson Reis | 3

Finals
(United States) | Joe Warren | SD
(Brazil) | Patricio Freire | 3

== Bellator 24 ==
Bellator 24
- Promotion: Bellator Fighting Championships
- Date: August 12, 2010
- Venue: Seminole Hard Rock Hotel & Casino
- City: Hollywood, Florida, United States

Event chronology
| Bellator 23 | Bellator 24 | Bellator 25 |

Bellator 24 was a mixed martial arts event held by Bellator Fighting Championships. The event took place on Thursday, August 12, 2010, at the Seminole Hard Rock Hotel & Casino in Hollywood, Florida. The card began Bellator Season Three and featured the first round of the Bellator 115-pound women's tournament and an opening round fight in the Heavyweight tournament.

Background

Two bouts, Nico Parella vs. Efrain Ruiz and Frank Carrillo vs. Moyses Gabin, were scratched from the untelevised portion of this card. Parella pulled his groin and Gabin suffered a broken foot, which forced both off the card.

Results

Main card
| Weight class | | | | Method | Round | Time | Notes |
|---|---|---|---|---|---|---|---|
| Middleweight | Hector Lombard | def. | Herbert Goodman | KO (punches) | 1 | 0:38 |
| Heavyweight | Neil Grove | def. | Eddie Sanchez | TKO (doctor stoppage) | 1 | 1:32 | (Note: Heavyweight Quarterfinal) |
| Women's Strawweight | Megumi Fujii | def. | Carla Esparza | submission (armbar) | 2 | 0:57 | (Note: Strawweight Quarterfinal) |
| Women's Strawweight | Jessica Aguilar | def. | Lynn Alvarez | submission (arm triangle choke) | 1 | 4:01 | (Note: Strawweight Quarterfinal) |
Local Feature Fights
| Weight class | | | | Method | Round | Time | Notes |
| Lightweight | Yves Edwards | def. | Luis Palomino | unanimous decision (29–28, 29–28, 29–28) | 3 | 5:00 |
| Featherweight | Farkhad Sharipov | def. | Eric Luke | unanimous decision (30–27, 30–27, 30–27) | 3 | 5:00 |
| Bantamweight | Tulio Quintanilla | def. | Brian Eckstein | KO (punches) | 3 | 2:48 |

== Bellator 25 ==
Bellator 25
- Promotion: Bellator Fighting Championships
- Date: August 19, 2010
- Venue: Chicago Theatre
- City: Chicago, Illinois, United States

Event chronology
| Bellator 24 | Bellator 25 | Bellator 26 |

Bellator 25 was a mixed martial arts event held by Bellator Fighting Championships. This event took place on August 19, 2010, at the Chicago Theatre in Chicago, Illinois. The card featured tournament fights in Bellator's third season. The event was distributed live in prime time by FOX Sports Net and its regional sports network affiliates. In Japan, the event was distributed with a short delay by Cavea.

Background

A lightweight bout featuring Mark Miller and Josh Shockley was set to happen at this event. But the week before the event, the bout was scratched when Miller suffered a rib injury in training.

Results

Main card
| Weight class | | | | Method | Round | Time | Notes |
|---|---|---|---|---|---|---|---|
| Welterweight | Dan Hornbuckle | def. | Brad Blackburn | unanimous decision (29–28, 29–28, 29–28) | 3 | 5:00 | (Note: To earn a spot in Bellator's Season Four Welterweight Tournament.) |
| Heavyweight | Cole Konrad | def. | Rogent Lloret | unanimous decision (30–27, 30–27, 30–27) | 3 | 5:00 | (Note: Heavyweight Quarterfinal) |
| Heavyweight | Damian Grabowski | def. | Scott Barrett | unanimous decision (30–27, 30–27, 30–27) | 3 | 5:00 | (Note: Heavyweight Quarterfinal) |
| Women's Strawweight | Zoila Frausto Gurgel | def. | Jessica Penne | unanimous decision (30–27, 30–27, 30–27) | 3 | 5:00 | (Note: Women's Strawweight Quarterfinal) |
Local Feature Fights
| Weight class | | | | Method | Round | Time | Notes |
| Catchweight (177 lbs) | Torrance Taylor | def. | Shonie Carter | unanimous decision (30–26, 30–27, 30–27) | 3 | 5:00 |
| Welterweight | Brian Gassaway | def. | Kevin Knabjian | unanimous decision (29–28, 29–28, 29–28) | 3 | 5:00 |
| Welterweight | Kenny Robertson | def. | John Kolosci | submission (americana) | 2 | 2:41 |
| Lightweight | Eric Kriegermeier | def. | Keoki Cypriano | submission (triangle choke) | 1 | 3:16 |

== Bellator 26 ==
Bellator 26
- Promotion: Bellator Fighting Championships
- Date: August 26, 2010
- Venue: Kansas City Power & Light District
- City: Kansas City, Missouri, United States
- Attendance: 4,000

Event chronology
| Bellator 25 | Bellator 26 | Bellator 27 |

Bellator 26 was a mixed martial arts event held by Bellator Fighting Championships. The event took place on Thursday, August 26, 2010, at Kansas City Power & Light District in Kansas City, Missouri. The card featured tournament fights in Bellator's third season. The event was distributed live in prime time by FOX Sports Net and its regional sports network affiliates.

Background

Rory Markham was scheduled to fight Steve Carl, however Markham was not medically cleared. Tyler Stinson took his place.

Results

Main card
| Weight class | | | | Method | Round | Time | Notes |
|---|---|---|---|---|---|---|---|
| Catchweight (175 lb) | Steve Carl | def. | Tyler Stinson | Technical submission (guillotine choke) | 1 | 2:30 | (Note: To earn a spot in Bellator's Season Four Welterweight Tournament.) |
| Heavyweight | Alexey Oleinik | def. | Mike Hayes | Split decision (28–29, 29–28, 29–28). | 3 | 5:00 | (Note: Heavyweight quarterfinal.) |
| Bantamweight | Jose Vega | def. | Danny Tims | Unanimous decision (29–28, 30–27, 29–28) | 3 | 5:00 | (Note: Bantamweight quarterfinal.) |
| Women's (115 lb) | Lisa Ward | def. | Aisling Daly | unanimous decision (30–27, 30–27, 30–27) | 3 | 5:00 | (Note: Women's (115 lb) quarterfinal.) |
Local Feature Fights
| Weight class | | | | Method | Round | Time | Notes |
| Middleweight | Zak Cummings | def. | Rudy Bears | Submission (D'arce choke) | 1 | 1:27 |
| Featherweight | Kevin Croom | def. | Brian Davidson | Submission (rear-naked choke) | 2 | 3:22 |
| Middleweight | John Ott | def. | Brian Imes | Unanimous decision (30–27, 30–27, 30–27) | 3 | 5:00 |
| Light Heavyweight | Jeb Chiles | def. | Demetrius Richards | Technical submission (kimura) | 2 | 3:51 |

== Bellator 27 ==
Bellator 27
- Promotion: Bellator Fighting Championships
- Date: September 2, 2010
- Venue: Majestic Theatre
- City: San Antonio, Texas, United States
- Attendance: 600

Event chronology
| Bellator 26 | Bellator 27 | Bellator 28 |

Bellator 27 was a mixed martial arts event held by Bellator Fighting Championships. The event took place on Thursday, September 2, 2010, at Majestic Theatre in San Antonio, Texas. The card featured tournament fights in Bellator's third season. The event was distributed live in prime time by FOX Sports Net and its regional sports network affiliates.

Results

Main card
| Weight class | | | | Method | Round | Time | Notes |
|---|---|---|---|---|---|---|---|
| Featherweight | Joe Warren | def. | Joe Soto (c) | TKO (knee & punches) | 2 | 0:33 | (Note: For the Bellator Featherweight Championship.) |
| Bantamweight | Ulysses Gomez | def. | Travis Reddinger | Split decision (28–29, 29–28, 29–28) | 3 | 5:00 | (Note: Bantamweight quarterfinal.) |
| Bantamweight | Zach Makovsky | def. | Nick Mamalis | Unanimous decision (30–27, 30–27, 30–27) | 3 | 5:00 | (Note: Bantamweight quarterfinal.) |
| Bantamweight | Ed West | def. | Bryan Goldsby | Unanimous decision (30–27, 29–28, 29–28) | 3 | 5:00 | (Note: Bantamweight quarterfinal.) |
Local Feature Fights
| Weight class | | | | Method | Round | Time | Notes |
| Middleweight | Andrew Craig | def. | Rodrigo Pinheiro | TKO (doctor stoppage) | 3 | 2:53 |
| Lightweight | Gilbert Jimenez | def. | Aaron Barringer | Unanimous decision. | 3 | 5:00 |
| Heavyweight | Richard Odoms | def. | Dale Mitchell | Split decision | 3 | 5:00 |
| Welterweight | Andrew Chappelle | def. | Joe Christopher | Unanimous decision | 3 | 5:00 |
| Light Heavyweight | Jon Kirk | def. | Shane Faulkner | TKO (punches) | 3 | 2:19 |
| Featherweight | Steven Peterson | def. | Ernest De La Cruz | Unanimous decision (30–27, 30–27, 29–28) | 3 | 5:00 |

== Bellator 28 ==
Bellator 28
- Promotion: Bellator Fighting Championships
- Date: September 9, 2010
- Venue: Mahalia Jackson Theater
- City: New Orleans, Louisiana, United States

Event chronology
| Bellator 27 | Bellator 28 | Bellator 29 |

Bellator 28 was a mixed martial arts event held by Bellator Fighting Championships. The event took place on Thursday, September 9, 2010, at Mahalia Jackson Theater in New Orleans, Louisiana. The event was distributed live in prime time by FOX Sports Net and its regional sports network affiliates. This was the first Bellator card with no Tournament Bouts.

Background

Chas Skelly was expected to fight Georgi Karakhanyan in a fourth season featherweight tournament qualifier bout. However, Skelly injured himself during training and was forced to pull out of the bout. Skelly's replacement was to be UFC veteran, Alvin Robinson. However, Robinson was also forced to pull out of the bout due to injury. Robinson was replaced by WEC veteran Anthony Leone.

Toney Canales and J.C. Pennington were set to fight, but for unknown reasons, the fight was pulled at the last minute.

The card took place in the same city and during the same night and time as the 2010 NFL season opener, a rematch of the NFC Championship game between the New Orleans Saints and the Minnesota Vikings, a decision in MMA to counter-program a marquee NFL event which may have had adverse effect on local ticket sales.

Results

Main card
| Weight class | | | | Method | Round | Time | Notes |
|---|---|---|---|---|---|---|---|
| Lightweight | Eric Larkin | def. | Marcus Andrusia | Submission (guillotine choke) | 1 | 2:46 |
| Lightweight | Guyana Carey Vanier | def. | Rich Clementi | Split decision (29–28, 28–29, 29–28) | 3 | 5:00 | (Note: To earn a spot in Bellator's Season Four Lightweight Tournament.) |
| Middleweight | Eric Schambari | def. | Matt Horwich | Split decision (30–27, 28–29, 30–27) | 3 | 5:00 |
| Featherweight | Georgi Karakhanyan | def. | Anthony Leone | Unanimous decision (29–28, 30–27, 30–27) | 3 | 5:00 | (Note: To earn a spot in Bellator's Season Four Featherweight Tournament.) |
Local Feature Fights
| Weight class | | | | Method | Round | Time | Notes |
| Heavyweight | Tony Roberts | def. | Kelvin Doss | Submission (punches) | 1 | 3:35 |
| Bantamweight | Jonathan Mackles | def. | Brock Kerry | Split decision (30–27, 28–29, 29–28) | 3 | 5:00 |
| Welterweight | Charlie Rader | def. | Josh Rafferty | TKO (punches) | 1 | 1:14 |
| Lightweight | Scott O'Shaughnessy | def. | Gabe Woods | Submission (armbar) | 3 | 2:11 |

== Bellator 29 ==
Bellator 29
- Promotion: Bellator Fighting Championships
- Date: September 16, 2010
- Venue: The Rave
- City: Milwaukee, Wisconsin, United States

Event chronology
| Bellator 28 | Bellator 29 | Bellator 30 |

Bellator 29 was a mixed martial arts event held by Bellator Fighting Championships. The event took place on Thursday, September 16, 2010, at The Rave in Milwaukee, Wisconsin. The card featured tournament fights in Bellator's third season. The event was distributed live in prime time by FOX Sports Net and its regional sports network affiliates.

Background

Bellator 29 was the first sanctioned MMA event in Wisconsin.

Chico Camus was set to compete against Jameel Massouh in a catchweight bout. However, Camus injured his sternum in a car accident and was forced to withdraw from the bout. Kyle Dietz was set to be Camus' replacement; however, an illness forced Ulysses Gomez out of his bout in the bantamweight tournament and Bryan Goldsby, who was set to fight Nik Mamalis, stepped in for Gomez and returned to the tournament. Dietz was dropped from the card, and Mamalis stepped in to fight Massoush.

Justin Lemke was originally set to fight David Oliva, but Oliva was forced out of the bout due to weight issues. Jason Guida stepped in for Oliva as his replacement.

The Massouh/Mamalis bout was originally contracted as a 140 lb catchweight fight. Massouh initially weighed in two pounds over the limit, but successfully made weight two hours after the original weigh-in on a subsequent attempt. Jason Guida weighed in five pounds over the 210 lb catchweight limit in his bout against Justin Lemke.

Results

Main card
| Weight class | | | | Method | Round | Time | Notes |
|---|---|---|---|---|---|---|---|
| Catchweight (140 lb) | Jameel Massouh | def. | Nick Mamalis | Submission (guillotine choke) | 1 | 4:27 |
| Heavyweight | Cole Konrad | def. | Damian Grabowski | Unanimous decision (30–26, 30–27, 30–27) | 3 | 5:00 | (Note: Heavyweight semifinal.) |
| Heavyweight | Neil Grove | def. | Alexey Oleinik | TKO (punches) | 1 | 0:45 | (Note: Heavyweight semifinal.) |
| Middleweight | Brett Cooper | def. | Matt Major | TKO (punches) | 2 | 1:27 |
Local Feature Fights
| Catchweight (215 lb) | Justin Lemke | def. | Jason Guida | Split decision (29–28, 28–29, 29–28) | 3 | 5:00 |
| Lightweight | Sasa Perkic | def. | Nick Dupees | Unanimous decision (30–27, 30 -27, 29–28) | 3 | 5:00 |
| Middleweight | Kyle Weickhardt | def. | Luis Ramirez | KO (head kick) | 1 | 0:30 |

== Bellator 30 ==
Bellator 30
- Promotion: Bellator Fighting Championships
- Date: September 23, 2010
- Venue: Fourth Street Live!
- City: Louisville, Kentucky, United States

Event chronology
| Bellator XXIX | Bellator 30 | Bellator XXXI |

Bellator 30 was a mixed martial arts event held by Bellator Fighting Championships. The event took place on Thursday, September 23, 2010, at Fourth Street Live! in Louisville, Kentucky. The card featured tournament fights in Bellator's third season. The event was distributed live in prime time by FOX Sports Net and its regional sports network affiliates.

Background Bryan Goldsby replaced Ulysses Gomez in the bantamweight tournament after Gomez was forced to withdraw due to staph infection.

Results

Main card
| Weight class | | | | Method | Round | Time | Notes |
|---|---|---|---|---|---|---|---|
| Welterweight | Brent Weedman | def. | Jacob McClintock | TKO (punches) | 1 | 3:05 | (Note: To earn a spot in Bellator's Season Four Welterweight Tournament.) |
| Middleweight | Bryan Baker | def. | Jeremy Horn | Unanimous decision (30–27, 29–28, 29–28) | 3 | 5:00 |
| Bantamweight | Zach Makovsky | def. | Bryan Goldsby | Unanimous decision (30–27, 29–28, 29–28) | 3 | 5:00 | (Note: Bantamweight semifinal.) |
| Bantamweight | Ed West | def. | Jose Vega | Split decision (29–28, 28–29, 29–28). | 3 | 5:00 | (Note: Bantamweight semifinal.) |
Local Feature Fights
| Middleweight | John Troyer | def. | Josh Clark | Unanimous decision (30–27, 30–27, 30–27) | 3 | 5:00 |
| Heavyweight | Ron Sparks | def. | Greg Maynard | KO (punch) | 1 | 0:50 |
| Featherweight | B.J. Ferguson | def. | T.J. Barber | Submission (armbar) | 2 | 2:50 |
| Middleweight | Jeremiah Riggs | def. | Mike Fleniken | Unanimous decision (29–28, 29–28, 29–28). | 3 | 5:00 |
| Welterweight | Mike O'Donnell | def. | Stoney Hale | Submission (kimura) | 2 | 0:50 |

== Bellator 31 ==
Bellator 31
- Promotion: Bellator Fighting Championships
- Date: September 30, 2010
- Venue: L'Auberge du Lac Resort
- City: Lake Charles, Louisiana, United States

Event chronology
| Bellator 30 | Bellator 31 | Bellator 32 |

Bellator 31 was a mixed martial arts event held by Bellator Fighting Championships. The event took place on Thursday, September 30, 2010, at L'Auberge du Lac Resort in Lake Charles, Louisiana. The card featured tournament fights in Bellator's third season. The event was distributed live in prime time by FOX Sports Net and its regional sports network affiliates.

Background

A previously announced fight between Ricco Rodriguez and Dave Herman, was scrapped from this card due to Rodriguez suffering a knee injury. Michal Kita served as Rodriguez's replacement.

Results

Main card
| Weight class | | | | Method | Round | Time | Notes |
|---|---|---|---|---|---|---|---|
| Women's (115 lb) | Zoila Frausto Gurgel | def. | Jessica Aguilar | Split decision (30–27, 27–30, 30–27) | 3 | 5:00 | (Note: Women's (115 lb) semifinal.) |
| Women's (115 lb) | Megumi Fujii | def. | Lisa Ward | Submission (armbar) | 1 | 1:39 | (Note: Women's (115 lb) semifinal.) |
| Welterweight | Chris Lozano | def. | Yoshiyuki Yoshida | TKO (Corner Stoppage) | 2 | 5:00 | (Note: To earn a spot in Bellator's Season Four Welterweight Tournament.) |
Local Feature Fights
| Heavyweight | Mark Holata | def. | Shawn Jordan | KO (punch) | 1 | 1:13 |
| Lightweight | John Harris | def. | Kyle Miers | Submission (Rear Naked Choke) | 2 | 0:49 |
| Middleweight | Tim Ruberg | def. | Aaron Davis | Submission (Rear Naked Choke) | 2 | 1:44 |
| Heavyweight | Dave Herman | def. | Michał Kita | Submission (Omoplata) | 1 | 3:16 |
| Catchweight (165 lb) | Michael Chandler | def. | Scott Stapp | TKO (Punches) | 1 | 1:57 |

== Bellator 32 ==
Bellator 32
- Promotion: Bellator Fighting Championships
- Date: October 14, 2010
- Venue: Kansas City Power & Light District
- City: Kansas City, Missouri, United States

Event chronology
| Bellator 31 | Bellator 32 | Bellator 33 |

Bellator 32 was a mixed martial arts event held by Bellator Fighting Championships. The event took place on Thursday, October 14, 2010, at Kansas City Power & Light District in Kansas City, Missouri. The card featured the tournament finals fights in Bellator's third season. The event was distributed live in prime time by FOX Sports Net and its regional sports network affiliates.

Background

This was the fourth Bellator event to be held at the Kansas City Power & Light District, all in 2010. Bellator XVI, Bellator XXII and Bellator XXVI have also been held at this venue.

The event hosted bouts to crown the first Bellator Heavyweight and Bantamweight Champions.

Results

Main card
| Weight class | | | | Method | Round | Time | Notes |
|---|---|---|---|---|---|---|---|
| Heavyweight | Cole Konrad | def. | Neil Grove | Submission (americana) | 1 | 4:45 | (Note: Tournament final for the inaugural Bellator Heavyweight Championship.) |
| Bantamweight | Zach Makovsky | def. | Ed West | Unanimous decision (50–45, 50–45, 49–46) | 3 | 5:00 | (Note: Tournament final for the inaugural Bellator Bantamweight Championship.) |
| Welterweight | Jim Wallhead | def. | Ryan Thomas | Unanimous decision (29–28, 29–28, 29–28) | 3 | 5:00 | (Note: To earn a spot in Bellator's Season Four Welterweight Tournament.) |
| Welterweight | Michael Chandler | def. | Chris Page | Submission (guillotine choke) | 1 | 0:57 |
Local Feature Fights
| Featherweight | Eric Marriott | def. | Ryan Roberts | Unanimous decision (29–28, 29–28, 30–27) | 3 | 5:00 |
| Catchweight (180 lbs) | Rudy Bears | def. | Chad Reiner | KO (Punches) | 1 | 1:29 of round 1. |
| Bantamweight | Jared Downing | def. | Danny Tims | Split decision (30–27, 28–29, 30–27). | 3 | 5:00 |
| Featherweight | Brian Davidson | def. | Shane Hutchison | KO (punches) | 1 | 0:54 |

== Bellator 33 ==
Bellator 33
- Promotion: Bellator Fighting Championships
- Date: October 21, 2010
- Venue: Liacouras Center
- City: Philadelphia, Pennsylvania, United States

Event chronology
| Bellator 32 | Bellator 33 | Bellator 34 |

Bellator 33 was a mixed martial arts event held by Bellator Fighting Championships. The event took place on Thursday, October 21, 2010, at Liacouras Center in Philadelphia, Pennsylvania. The card featured a tournament final fight in Bellator's third season. The event was distributed live in prime time by FOX Sports Net and its regional sports network affiliates.

Background

The main event was supposed to feature Eddie Alvarez defending his lightweight title against season two's lightweight tournament winner, Pat Curran. Curran injured himself during training so Alvarez instead fought Roger Huerta in a non-title fight.

Wilson Reis vs. Deividas Taurosevičius was set to air as a part of the night's main card; however, the fight was not aired for unknown reasons.

Results

Main card
| Weight class | | | | Method | Round | Time | Notes |
|---|---|---|---|---|---|---|---|
| Lightweight | Eddie Alvarez | def. | Roger Huerta | TKO (doctor stoppage) | 2 | 5:00 |
| Welterweight | Ben Askren | def. | Lyman Good (c) | Unanimous decision (49–46, 48–47, 50–45) | 5 | 5:00 | (Note: For the Bellator Welterweight Championship.) |
| Welterweight | Rick Hawn | def. | LeVon Maynard | KO (punches) | 1 | 4:53 | (Note: To earn a spot in Bellator's Season Four Welterweight Tournament.) |
Local Feature Fights
| Featherweight | Wilson Reis | def. | Deividas Taurosevičius | Split decision (29–28, 28–29, 29–28) | 3 | 5:00 |
| Light Heavyweight | Tim Carpenter | def. | Jamal Patterson | Split decision (29–28, 28–29, 29–28) | 3 | 5:00 |
| Catchweight (159 lbs) | Luiz Azeredo | def. | Edward Guedes | Unanimous decision (30–27, 30–27, 30–27) | 3 | 5:00 |
| Featherweight | Kenny Foster | def. | Lester Caslow | Unanimous decision (29–28, 29–28, 29–28) | 3 | 5:00 |
| Catchweight (130 lb) | Nick Cottone | def. | Tuan Pham | Unanimous decision (29–28, 29–28, 29–28) | 3 | 5:00 |
| Bantamweight | Francis Evans | def. | Lewis Cassner | Submission (Triangle) | 1 | 3:20 |

== Bellator 34 ==
Bellator 34
- Promotion: Bellator Fighting Championships
- Date: October 28, 2010
- Venue: Seminole Hard Rock Hotel & Casino
- City: Hollywood, Florida, United States

Event chronology
| Bellator 33 | Bellator 34 | Bellator 35 |

Bellator 34 was a mixed martial arts event held by Bellator Fighting Championships. The event took place on Thursday, October 28, 2010, at Seminole Hard Rock Hotel & Casino in Hollywood, Florida. The card featured the final round of the Bellator 115-pound women's tournament in Bellator's third season, as well as Hector Lombard defending his middleweight title. The event was distributed live in prime time by FOX Sports Net and its regional sports network affiliates.

Results

Main card
| Weight class | | | | Method | Round | Time | Notes |
|---|---|---|---|---|---|---|---|
| Middleweight | Hector Lombard (c) | def. | Alexander Shlemenko | Unanimous decision (49–46, 49–46, 49–46) | 5 | 5:00 | (Note: For the Bellator Middleweight Championship.) |
| Women's (115 lb) | Zoila Frausto Gurgel | def. | Megumi Fujii | Split decision (48–47, 47–48, 49–46) | 5 | 5:00 | (Note: Tournament final for the inaugural Bellator Women's (115 lbs) Championship.) |
| Middleweight | Mike Bernhard | def. | Dragan Tešanović | Unanimous decision (30–27, 29–28, 29–28). | 3 | 5:00 |
| Light Heavyweight | Rafael Davis | def. | Tony Lopez | Unanimous decision (30–27, 30–27, 30–27) | 3 | 5:00 |
Local Feature Fights
| Welterweight | John Kelly | def. | William Kuhn | unanimous decision (29–28, 29–28, 29–28). |
| Bantamweight | Ralph Acosta | def. | Tulio Quintanila | Split decision (29–28, 28–29, 29–28) | 3 | 5:00 |
| Middleweight | Frank Carrillo | def. | Moyses Gabin | Unanimous decision (30–27, 30–27, 30–27) | 3 | 5:00 |
| Middleweight | Dan Cramer | def. | Igor Almeida | TKO (cut) | 1 | 2:36 |
| Catchweight (160 lb) | J.P. Reese | def. | Bounmy Somchay | TKO (strikes) | 1 | 3:32 |

== Tournaments ==
=== Heavyweight Tournament bracket ===
Quarterfinals
(United States) | Cole Konrad | UD
(Spain) | Rogent Lloret | 3
(Poland) | Damian Grabowski | UD
(United States) | Scott Barrett | 3
(England) | Neil Grove | TKO
(United States) | Eddie Sanchez | 1
(Russia) | Alexey Oleinik | SD
(United States) | Mike Hayes | 3

Semifinals
(United States) | Cole Konrad | UD
(Poland) | Damian Grabowski | 3
(England) | Neil Grove | TKO
(Russia) | Alexey Oleinik | 1

Finals
(United States) | Cole Konrad | SUB
(England) | Neil Grove | 1

=== Bantamweight Tournament bracket ===
Quarterfinals
(United States) | Zach Makovsky | UD
(United States) | Nick Mamalis | 3
(United States) | Ulysses Gomez | SD
(United States) | Travis Reddinger | 3
(United States) | Ed West | UD
(United States) | Bryan Goldsby | 3
(United States) | Jose Vega | UD
(United States) | Danny Tims | 3

Semifinals
(United States) | Zach Makovsky | UD
(United States) | Bryan Goldsby | 3
(United States) | Ed West | SD
(United States) | Jose Vega | 3

Finals
(United States) | Zach Makovsky | UD
(United States) | Ed West | 5

1: Bryan Goldsby replaced Ulysses Gomez after Gomez was forced to withdraw due to staph infection.

=== Women's Strawweight Tournament bracket ===
Quarterfinals
(United States) | Zoila Frausto Gurgel | UD
(United States) | Jessica Penne | 3
(Mexico) | Jessica Aguilar | SUB
(United States) | Lynn Alvarez | 1
(Japan) | Megumi Fujii | SUB
(United States) | Carla Esparza | 2
(United States) | Lisa Ward | UD
(Republic of Ireland) | Aisling Daly | 3

Semifinals
(United States) | Zoila Frausto Gurgel | SD
(Mexico) | Jessica Aguilar | 3
(Japan) | Megumi Fujii | SUB
(United States) | Lisa Ward | 1

Finals
(United States) | Zoila Frausto Gurgel | SD
(Japan) | Megumi Fujii | 5

1: Carla Esparza replaced Angela Magana after Magana was forced to withdraw due to a foot injury.
