= Ed West (fighter) =

Mixed martial artist

- Born: October 30, 1983 (age 42); Olongapo, Philippines
- Other names: Wild
- Nationality: American
- Height: 5 ft 9 in (1.75 m)
- Weight: 135 lb (61 kg; 9.6 st)
- Division: Bantamweight
- Reach: 68 in (173 cm)
- Fighting out of: Tucson, Arizona, United States
- Team: Apex MMA
- Trainer: Rocco DePalo
- Rank: 3rd Degree Black Belt in Taekwondo; Black Belt in Karate; Black Belt in Judo; Black Belt in Aikido; Black Belt in Kung Fu; Black Belt in Jujutsu
- Years active: 2003–present

Mixed martial arts record
- Total: 35
- Wins: 25
- By knockout: 1
- By submission: 14
- By decision: 10
- Losses: 10
- By knockout: 3
- By submission: 1
- By decision: 6

Other information
- Mixed martial arts record from Sherdog

Ed West (born October 30, 1983) is a Filipino-born American mixed martial artist. He competed in the Bantamweight division of Bellator MMA, and the World Series of Fighting (WSOF).

== Early life ==
West was born in Olongapo, Philippines where both his mother and father served in the US Navy. He attended kindergarten, first grade and his first Tae Kwon Do classes there and then moved to the States with his parents when he was 7 years old.

A few years after arriving in America, Ed became re-involved in martial arts when he was 9 years old. He was inspired by watching Jean-Claude Van Damme movies and practiced styles like Karate, Taekwondo, Judo, Aikido, Jujutsu, and Kung Fu. At 16, Ed met a man who told him he was a cage fighter, which led West to travel down the road of Mixed Martial Arts. West's first cage fight was in March 2003 fighting in the Rage in the Cage organization.

West also attended Pima Community College in Tucson, Arizona, where he studied nutrition and sports medicine.

== Mixed martial arts career ==
West currently trains at Apex MMA in Tucson, Arizona. Since 2003, West has fought in many MMA organizations in the United States, where he finished 9 of his 17 victories with a submission (particularly armbars) as a professional fighter. He made his debut in the Rage in the Cage tournaments and piled up a successful winning record.

=== International Fight League ===
In 2006–2007, West competed in the team-based International Fight League as a member of Ken Yasuda's Tokyo Sabres. Despite his three losses in the IFL, West proved himself by moving up two weight classes and fighting against bigger fighters in the lightweight division. Although West's first IFL match was a loss to his opponent, Chris Horodecki, after having to be decided by the judges, the pair put on a tough battle that was awarded "Fight of the Night" honors.

=== Desert Rage Full Contact Fighting ===
In 2010, West won Arizona's Desert Rage Full Contact Fighting bantamweight championship when he defeated Tyler Bialecki. West then defended his belt against Sam Rodriguez the following year.

=== Bellator Fighting Championships ===
West quickly became a fan favorite when he entered the Bellator Fighting Championships bantamweight tournament in 2010. At Bellator 32, West fought Zach Makovsky in the finals for the chance to become the Bellator bantamweight champion. Despite a noble effort, fighting a war for five rounds, Makovsky received the unanimous decision.

West took on Luis Nogueira at Bellator 51 in the opening round of the season 5 tournament. He won by unanimous decision. West would then take Eduardo Dantas in the semi-finals at Bellator 55. He lost by Split Decision.

West took on Marcos Galvão at Bellator 65 in the season six quarter-finals match up. He lost via unanimous decision.

At Bellator 91 West would take on Josh Montoya. He won via Knockout, which happens to be his first win by knockout.

After his win over Montoya, West was granted his release from Bellator MMA and became a free agent.

=== Independent promotions ===
After parting ways with Bellator, West returned almost a year later and faced Antonio Duarte at MF - Mexico Fighter 5 on February 15, 2014. West lost the bout via anaconda choke submission in the first round, the first submission loss of his career.

=== Return to Bellator ===
On May 29, 2014, it was announced that West re-signed with Bellator.

West faced Mike Richman on September 26, 2014, at Bellator 126. He lost the fight via knockout in the first round.

=== World Series of Fighting ===
West signed with World Series of Fighting and faced Russian fighter Timur Valiev in his debut on March 28, 2015. He lost the fight via TKO in the first round.

== Championships and accomplishments ==
=== Mixed martial arts ===
- International Fight League
  - Fight of the Night (One time) vs. Chris Horodecki
- Desert Rage Full Contact Fighting
  - DRFCF Bantamweight Championship (One time; Current)
- Rage in the Cage
  - RITC Lightweight Championship (One time)

== Mixed martial arts record ==
Professional record breakdown
36 matches	26 wins	10 losses
By knockout	1	3
By submission	15	1
By decision	10	6

Res.	Record	Opponent	Method	Event	Date	Round	Time	Location	Notes
Win	26–10	Andres "The Punisher" Ponce	Submission (Arm Triangle)	Rise of the Prospects: Cage Series IX	November 15, 2025	1	2:25	Tucson, Arizona, United States	
Win	25–10	Matt Betzold	Decision (unanimous)	WFF 40	October 27, 2018	5	5:00	Chandler, Arizona, United States	Won the WFF Bantamweight Championship.
Win	24–10	Daniel Soto	Submission (armbar)	RUF MMA 27	August 11, 2018	1	1:36	Tucson, Arizona, United States	Won the RUF MMA Featherweight Championship.
Win	23–10	Gilberto Aguilar	Submission (verbal)	Aggression Session MMA: Anarchy	September 2, 2017	1	3:22	Prescott Valley, Arizona, United States	Won the AS Bantamweight Championship.
Win	22–10	Glen Baker	Submission (rear-naked choke)	WFF 34	June 3, 2017	1	1:55	Chandler, Arizona, United States	
Win	21–10	Chris Hernandez	Submission (triangle choke)	Cage Rage at the Diamond 2	July 18, 2016	1	0:29	Sahuarita, Arizona, United States	
Win	20–10	Roman Salazar	Decision (unanimous)	Aggression Session 3	June 18, 2016	3	5:00	Scottsdale, Arizona, United States	
Win	19–10	Jose Carbajal	Submission (rear-naked choke)	RITC: Rage in the Cage 179	August 15, 2015	1	3:05	Yuma, Arizona, United States	
Loss	18–10	Timur Valiev	TKO (punches)	WSOF 19: Gaethje vs. Palomino	March 28, 2015	1	1:39	Phoenix, Arizona, United States	
Loss	18–9	Mike Richman	KO (punches)	Bellator 126	September 26, 2014	1	2:44	Phoenix, Arizona, United States	
Loss	18–8	Antonio Duarte	Submission (anaconda choke)	MF - Mexico Fighter 5	February 15, 2014	1	4:42	Hermosillo, Sonora, Mexico	
Win	18–7	Josh Montoya	KO (head kick)	Bellator 91	February 28, 2013	2	2:51	Rio Rancho, New Mexico, United States	
Loss	17–7	Marcos Galvão	Decision (unanimous)	Bellator 65	April 13, 2012	3	5:00	Atlantic City, New Jersey, United States	Bellator Season 6 Bantamweight Tournament Quarterfinal
Loss	17–6	Eduardo Dantas	Decision (split)	Bellator 55	October 22, 2011	3	5:00	Yuma, Arizona, United States	Bellator Season 5 Bantamweight Tournament Semifinal.
Win	17–5	Luis Nogueira	Decision (unanimous)	Bellator 51	September 24, 2011	3	5:00	Canton, Ohio, United States	Bellator Season 5 Bantamweight Tournament Quarterfinal.
Win	16–5	Sam Rodriguez	Submission (armbar)	Desert Rage Full Contact Fighting 9	March 18, 2011	1	1:22	Yuma, Arizona, United States	Defended Desert Rage Bantamweight Championship.
Loss	15–5	Zach Makovsky	Decision (unanimous)	Bellator 32	October 14, 2010	5	5:00	Kansas City, Missouri, United States	Bellator Season 3 Bantamweight Tournament Final.
Win	15–4	Jose Vega	Decision (split)	Bellator 30	September 23, 2010	3	5:00	Louisville, Kentucky, United States	Bellator Season 3 Bantamweight Tournament Semifinal.
Win	14–4	Bryan Goldsby	Decision (unanimous)	Bellator 27	September 2, 2010	3	5:00	San Antonio, Texas, United States	Bellator Season 3 Bantamweight Tournament Quarterfinal.
Win	13–4	Tyler Bialecki	Submission (triangle choke)	Desert Rage Full Contact Fighting 7	April 24, 2010	1	1:25	Yuma, Arizona, United States	Won the Desert Rage Bantamweight Championship.
Win	12–4	Jose Carbajal	Submission (guillotine choke)	Desert Rage Full Contact Fighting 6	November 7, 2009	1	1:38	Yuma, Arizona, United States	Bantamweight debut.
Win	11–4	Del Hawkins	Decision (unanimous)	Apocalypse Fights 1	August 7, 2008	3	N/A	United States	
Win	10–4	Austin Pascucci	Submission (armbar)	Rage in the Cage 109	April 26, 2008	2	0:28	Tucson, Arizona, United States	
Win	9–4	Nick Hedrick	Submission (rear-naked choke)	CS - Cage Supremacy 2	July 22, 2007	1	2:26	Tucson, Arizona, United States	
Loss	8–4	Savant Young	Decision (unanimous)	IFL: Houston	February 2, 2007	3	4:00	Houston, Texas, United States	
Loss	8–3	Erik Owings	Decision (unanimous)	IFL: Championship Final	December 29, 2006	3	4:00	Uncasville, Connecticut, United States	
Loss	8–2	Chris Horodecki	Decision (unanimous)	International Fight League: Portland	September 9, 2006	3	4:00	Portland, Oregon, United States	Fight of the Night.
Win	8–1	Carlos Ortega	Decision (unanimous)	RITC 79: The Rage Returns	February 24, 2006	3	3:00	Tucson, Arizona, United States	Won RITC Lightweight Championship; Earned RITC "Fighter of the Night" Honors.
Win	7–1	Reynaldo Walter Duarte	Decision (split)	RITC 76: Hello Tucson	November 11, 2005	3	3:00	Tucson, Arizona, United States	
Win	6–1	Chris David	Decision (unanimous)	RITC 64: Heart & Soul	August 7, 2004	3	3:00	Phoenix, Arizona, United States	
Win	5–1	Amos Sotelo	Submission (kimura)	RITC 61: Relentless	April 30, 2004	1	1:01	Phoenix, Arizona, United States	
Loss	4–1	Harris Sarmiento	TKO (punches)	SuperBrawl 34	March 28, 2004	1	2:08	Wailuku, Hawaii, United States	
Win	4–0	Carlos Ortega	Decision (unanimous)	RITC 59: Let the Punishment Begin	February 7, 2004	3	3:00	Casa Grande, Arizona, United States	
Win	3–0	Troy Tolbert	Submission (armbar)	RITC 57: Tucson Revisited	December 13, 2003	1	0:34	Tucson, Arizona, United States	
Win	2–0	Joe Vigil	Submission (armbar)	RITC 47: Unstoppable	April 12, 2003	1	1:57	Phoenix, Arizona, United States	
Win	1–0	Troy Tolbert	Submission (armbar)	RITC 46: Launching Pad	March 27, 2003	1	1:16	Tempe, Arizona, United States	

== See also ==
- List of male mixed martial artists
- List of female mixed martial artists
