= Lloyd Woodard =

American mixed martial arts fighter

- Born: November 12, 1984 (age 41); Memphis, Tennessee, United States
- Other names: Cupcake
- Height: 5 ft 11 in (1.80 m)
- Weight: 155 lb (70 kg; 11.1 st)
- Division: Welterweight; Lightweight; Featherweight
- Reach: 69.0 in (175 cm)
- Stance: Orthodox
- Fighting out of: Missoula, Montana, United States
- Team: Dogpound Fight Team
- Years active: 2005–present

Mixed martial arts record
- Total: 23
- Wins: 15
- By knockout: 5
- By submission: 7
- By decision: 2
- Unknown: 1
- Losses: 8
- By knockout: 4
- By decision: 4

Other information
- Mixed martial arts record from Sherdog

Lloyd Woodard (born November 12, 1984) is an American professional mixed martial artist, currently competing in Titan FC's lightweight division. A professional competitor since 2005, Woodard has also formerly competed for Bellator and King of the Cage.

== Background ==
Lloyd Woodard was born in Memphis, Tennessee, the third youngest of nine children. At the age of two, his parents divorced and him and his siblings were relocated to relatives' homes in different regions of the country. In South Memphis, Woodard learned to defend himself, being biracial, poor, and having a speech impediment until high school.

At Hellgate High School in Missoula, Montana, Woodard excelled at wrestling. He frequented a local boxing gym and competed in amateur mixed martial arts fights before becoming a professional.

In a Bellator interview, Woodard stated that he went through a "bad kid" phase growing up. When Woodard's best friend at the time got into an altercation with a former University of Montana basketball player, he and the rest of his friends came to Woodard, the "tough kid" on the block. Woodard avenged his friend by going to the basketball player's house and beating him severely. Woodard referred to this as the "breaking point" of his life. Although he did not participate in the fight, Woodard was convicted of felony burglary and violated his probation after getting into additional fights.

After his probation, he ended up in a prison boot camp. He said he was "glad it happened because I could control my feelings a lot better and have more control of my life."

== Mixed martial arts career ==
=== Early career ===
Woodard's first MMA match was on March 19, 2005. Before his professional debut on October 11, 2008, he amassed a 4-1 record. He made a name for himself as a "scrappy fighter" with "unorthodox" submission skills. Prior to signing with Bellator, Woodard amassed a perfect 10-0 record.

=== Bellator ===
Lloyd Woodard is currently signed to Bellator, competing in their Lightweight division. Woodard made his Bellator debut at Bellator 36 on March 12, 2011, where he defeated Carey Vanier via TKO. Woodard lost for the first time in his career by decision to future Bellator Lightweight Champion Michael Chandler as a Lightweight semifinalist in the Bellator Season Tournament. In the quarter finals of Bellator's Season 6 Lightweight Tournament, Woodard faced Patricky Freire at Bellator 62. Woodard defeated Freire via submission in a back-and-forth fight. On April 20, 2012, Woodard faced Rick Hawn in the semifinals. Woodard lost the bout via knockout in the second round.

Woodard then participated in the Bellator Season 8 Lightweight Tournament Quarterfinals on January 31, 2013 at Bellator 87 against David Rickels. Woodard lost via unanimous decision.

=== Post-Bellator ===
Woodard faced Dave Courchaine at ICF: Intense Cage Fighting 8 on March 22, 2013. Woodard lost via split decision, his third loss in a row. Woodard rebounded with a first-round TKO victory against Jerome Jones at KOTC: Unleashed on February 13, 2014.

Woodard is currently signed to Titan Fighting Championship. He made his debut for the organization against Kurt Holobaugh in a Titan FC Featherweight title eliminator bout on August 22, 2014 at Titan FC 29. He lost via TKO in just 15 seconds of round one. Woodard was expected to face Danny White at GCMMA: Magic City Mayhem 4 on October 14, 2014. However, the bout was cancelled for unknown reasons.

== Mixed martial arts record ==
Professional record breakdown
22 matches	14 wins	8 losses
By knockout	5	4
By submission	7	0
By decision	2	4

Res.	Record	Opponent	Method	Event	Date	Round	Time	Location	Notes
Loss	15–8	Gage Saunders	Decision (unanimous)	Fusion Fight League: Saunders vs. Mix	March 16, 2024	5	5:00	Missoula, Montana, United States	For the Fusion Fight League Welterweight Championship.
Loss	15–7	Jake Roberts	TKO (punches)	Intense Fighting Championship 24	April 9, 2016	1	N/A	Great Falls, Montana, United States	Lightweight bout.
Win	15–6	Billy Martin	Submission (rear-naked choke)	Fusion Fight League: Redemption	December 19, 2016	1	3:06	Billings, Montana, United States	Catchweight (180 lbs) bout.
Loss	14–6	Joe Eichelberger	KO (punches and elbows)	Prize FC 11: Rock N' Rumble	August 28, 2015	2	1:06	Williston, North Dakota, United States	For PFC Lightweight Championship.
Loss	14–5	Kurt Holobaugh	TKO (punches)	Titan FC 29	August 22, 2014	1	0:15	Fayetteville, North Carolina, United States	Featherweight debut; Titan FC Featherweight title eliminator.
Win	14–4	Jerome Jones	TKO (punches)	KOTC: Unleashed	February 13, 2014	2	2:28	Worley, Idaho, United States	
Win	13-4	Billy Martin	N/A	Fusion Fight League	November 30, 2016	N/A	N/A	Billings, Montana, United States	
Loss	12–4	Dave Courchaine	Decision (split)	ICF: Intense Cage Fighting 8	March 22, 2013	3	5:00	Tampa, Florida, United States	
Loss	12–3	David Rickels	Decision (unanimous)	Bellator 87	January 31, 2013	3	5:00	Mount Pleasant, Michigan, United States	Bellator Season Eight Lightweight Tournament Quarterfinal.
Loss	12–2	Rick Hawn	KO (punch)	Bellator 66	April 20, 2012	2	0:10	Cleveland, Ohio, United States	Bellator Season Six Lightweight Tournament Semifinal.
Win	12–1	Patricky Freire	Submission (kimura)	Bellator 62	March 23, 2012	2	1:46	Laredo, Texas, United States	Bellator Season Six Lightweight Tournament Quarterfinal.
Loss	11–1	Michael Chandler	Decision (unanimous)	Bellator 40	April 9, 2011	3	5:00	Newkirk, Oklahoma, United States	Bellator Season Four Lightweight Tournament Semifinal.
Win	11–0	Carey Vanier	TKO (punches)	Bellator 36	March 12, 2011	2	0:46	Shreveport, Louisiana, United States	Bellator Season Four Lightweight Tournament Quarterfinal.
Win	10–0	Alonzo Martinez	Submission (rear-naked choke)	Extreme Challenge: High Stakes	July 16, 2010	1	4:15	Council Bluffs, Iowa, United States	
Win	9–0	Jesse Evans	Submission (punches)	Pound'Em Productions: May 1 Mayhem	May 1, 2010	1	1:56	Dickinson, North Dakota, United States	
Win	8–0	Mike Hanks	TKO (punches)	CS: CageSport 9	February 20, 2010	3	1:54	Tacoma, Washington, United States	
Win	7–0	Sterling Ford	Submission (armbar)	CS: CageSport 8	December 5, 2009	3	3:17	Tacoma, Washington, United States	
Win	6–0	Ryan Healy	Decision (unanimous)	CS: CageSport 7	October 3, 2009	3	5:00	Tacoma, Washington, United States	
Win	5–0	Jake Oyler	Decision (unanimous)	FightForce: Missoula Mayhem 6	July 17, 2009	3	5:00	Missoula, Montana, United States	
Win	4–0	Marques Daniels	Submission (kimura)	CS: CageSport 5	May 16, 2009	1	4:51	Tacoma, Washington, United States	
Win	3–0	Ryan Burwick	TKO (punches)	BB: Badlands Beatdown	May 9, 2009	1	3:08	Dickinson, North Dakota, United States	
Win	2–0	Carmen Cassella	Submission (rear-naked choke)	SF: Sport Fight 25: Wildcard	April 3, 2009	1	2:31	Grand Ronde, Oregon, United States	
Win	1–0	Mel Ott	Submission (rear-naked choke)	EB: Beatdown at 4 Bears 3	October 11, 2008	1	1:30	New Town, North Dakota, United States	

=== Amateur mixed martial arts record ===
Professional record breakdown
5 matches	4 wins	1 loss
By knockout	0	1
By submission	3	0
By decision	0	0
Unknown	1	0

Res.	Record	Opponent	Method	Event	Date	Round	Time	Location	Notes
Win	4–1	Billy Hederson	N/A	Fightforce: Missoula Mayhem 3	July 12, 2008	N/A	N/A	Missoula, Montana, United States	
Win	3–1	Jeremy Jones	Submission (armbar)	Full Contact Fighting Federation: Rumble at the Roseland 22	May 20, 2006	1	2:26	Portland, Oregon, United States	
Win	2–1	Randy Bingham	Submission (rear-naked choke)	Montana Caged Combat	July 9, 2005	1	N/A	Montana, United States	
Loss	1–1	Ed Nuno	KO (punch)	SF: Sport Fight 10: Mayhem	May 28, 2005	1	2:50	Gresham, Oregon, United States	
Win	1–0	Loyal Newman	Submission	Full Contact Fighting Federation: Fight Night 7	March 19, 2005	1	3:18	Klamath Falls, Oregon, United States	
