= Carey Vanier =

American mixed martial arts fighter

- Born: Carey D. Vanier Sr. August 3, 1981 (age 45); West Demerara, Guyana
- Nationality: Guyanese; American
- Height: 5 ft 9 in (1.75 m)
- Weight: 155 lb (70 kg; 11.1 st)
- Division: Lightweight
- Fighting out of: Albuquerque, New Mexico
- Team: Jackson's Submission Fighting
- Rank: NJCAA Wrestling
- Years active: 2006-2014

Mixed martial arts record
- Total: 17
- Wins: 11
- By knockout: 5
- By submission: 4
- By decision: 2
- Losses: 6
- By knockout: 3
- By submission: 3

Other information
- Mixed martial arts record from Sherdog

Carey D. Vanier Sr. (born August 3, 1981) is a retired Guyanese-American mixed martial arts fighter. A professional from 2006 until 2014, he is perhaps best remembered for his stint in Bellator.

== Background ==
He began wrestling at an early age, and as a senior in high school, he finished sixth at the state wrestling finals. He enrolled at Ridgewater College, where he was eventually named an All-American.

== Mixed martial arts career ==
=== Bellator ===
After obtaining an 8–2 record, Carey was signed to the Bellator brand and will enter their second season lightweight tournament that started in April 2010. Carey won his first fight against Joe Duarte via TKO in the third round. The win moved him onto the semi-final round, where he lost to Toby Imada.

He fought and defeated UFC veteran Rich Clementi in a closely contested match at Bellator 28. At one point in the second round, Vanier grabbed a hold of the fence to defend a takedown. In the third round he landed two illegal knee strikes to Clementi's face; however, the referee did not deduct a point for them. The win earned Vanier a spot in the fourth-season lightweight tournament.

In October, Vanier moved to New Mexico and began training with Greg Jackson's team. His first fight as a part of his new team came at Bellator 36 against Lloyd Woodard. Vanier was defeated in the second round via TKO. The fight was a quarter-final fight in Bellator's season four lightweight tournament.

== Personal life ==
Vanier was born in Hopetown Village, Guyana, and moved to Minnesota at age 3 where he has lived ever since. After graduating from Ridgewater, he held off on fighting in order to support his young son, Carey Jr. He took a job at the local Best Buy and worked his way up the ranks until he was named store manager.

== Mixed martial arts record ==
Professional record breakdown
17 matches	11 wins	6 losses
By knockout	5	3
By submission	4	3
By decision	2	0

Res.	Record	Opponent	Method	Event	Date	Round	Time	Location	Notes
Loss	11–6	David Michaud	Submission (guillotine choke)	Dakota FC 17: Winter Brawl 2014	January 11, 2014	1	4:30	Fargo, North Dakota, United States	Catchweight (160 lb) bout.
Loss	11–5	Dakota Cochrane	KO (elbow)	Victory Fighting Championship 40	July 27, 2013	1	4:23	Ralston, Nebraska, United States	
Win	11–4	Jordan Larson	Submission (guillotine choke)	CFX 33 - Minnesota vs. Japan	April 28, 2012	3	2:14	Minneapolis, Minnesota, United States	
Loss	10–4	Lloyd Woodard	TKO (punches)	Bellator 36	March 12, 2011	2	0:46	Shreveport, Louisiana, United States	Lightweight Tournament Quarterfinal.
Win	10–3	Rich Clementi	Decision (split)	Bellator 28	September 9, 2010	3	5:00	New Orleans, Louisiana, United States	For spot in Season Four Lightweight Tournament.
Loss	9–3	Toby Imada	Submission (armbar)	Bellator 17	May 6, 2010	2	3:33	Boston, Massachusetts, United States	Lightweight Tournament Semifinal
Win	9–2	Joe Duarte	TKO (punches)	Bellator 13	April 8, 2009	3	4:14	Hollywood, Florida, United States	Lightweight Tournament Quarterfinal
Win	8–2	Paul Mann	TKO (punches)	Shogun Fights 1	October 24, 2009	2	2:09	Baltimore, Maryland, United States	
Win	7–2	Peter Grimes	Decision (split)	Cage Conflict Championships	June 20, 2009	5	5:00	Appleton, Wisconsin, United States	
Win	6–2	Derek Abram	Submission (armbar)	Seconds Out	February 13, 2009	2	1:26	Maplewood, Minnesota, United States	
Win	5–2	Sam Keigley	Submission (punches)	Minnesota Combat Sports	January 17, 2009	1	N/A	St. Paul, Minnesota, United States	
Win	4–2	Jesse Anderson	TKO (punches)	Brutaal - Fight Night	November 22, 2008	1	2:11	St. Cloud, Minnesota, United States	
Win	3–2	Seko Tongiola	TKO (punches)	Brutaal - Fight Night	October 3, 2008	1	0:57	Maplewood, Minnesota, United States	
Loss	2–2	Marshall Martin	Submission (triangle choke)	Max Fights 2	January 26, 2008	1	0:59	Fargo, North Dakota, United States	
Win	2–1	Wes Ronchi	Submission (choke)	UCS - Battle on the Bay 9	November 30, 2007	2	N/A	Superior, Wisconsin, United States	
Win	1–1	Logan Beckman	TKO (punches)	Twin Cities Throwdown 3	October 21, 2006	2	N/A	Burnsville, Minnesota, United States	
Loss	0–1	Nik Lentz	TKO (punches)	Extreme Fighting Xtreme	September 6, 2006	1	N/A	Minneapolis, Minnesota, United States	
