= Jeremy Spoon =

American mixed martial arts fighter

- Born: Jeremy Spoon; April 1, 1985 (age 41)
- Other names: Spooner
- Nationality: American
- Height: 5 ft 6 in (1.68 m)
- Weight: 145 lb (66 kg; 10.4 st)
- Division: Featherweight; Lightweight (formerly)
- Reach: 63 in (160 cm)
- Fighting out of: Chickasha, Oklahoma, United States
- Team: Apex Brazilian Jiu-Jitsu
- Years active: 2008–present

Mixed martial arts record
- Total: 25
- Wins: 20
- By knockout: 1
- By submission: 12
- By decision: 7
- Losses: 5
- By knockout: 1
- By submission: 1
- By decision: 3

Other information
- Mixed martial arts record from Sherdog

Jeremy Spoon (born April 1, 1985) is an American mixed martial artist. A professional MMA competitor since 2008, Spoon has made a name for himself fighting in various promotions, including King of the Cage and Bellator Fighting Championships. Spoon was a competitor in the Bellator season six and season seven featherweight tournaments.

== Mixed martial arts career ==
=== Background ===
Spoon holds a background in wrestling. He and his identical twin brother, Jerod Spoon, both competed in college, having started in seventh grade. In their junior year, Jeremy was state champion at 130lbs, whilst Jerod was runner-up at 135lbs.

Spoon was undefeated prior to joining Bellator. In that time, Spoon claimed a win over Jose Vega (a future Bellator tournament semi-finalist), a featherweight championship victory (and subsequent defense) in the Bricktown Brawl promotion and also defeated Donald Sanchez for the King of the Cage bantamweight (145lb) championship.

In mid-2011, both Jeremy Spoon and Jerod Spoon tried out for The Ultimate Fighter 14, which was the first edition of the show to feature bantamweights and featherweights. They tried out with the hope of being the first siblings to compete on the show, though coincidentally, whilst the Spoon siblings were not selected, two other siblings (Josh Ferguson and B.J. Ferguson) were.

=== Bellator Fighting Championships ===
Spoon made his Bellator Fighting Championships debut against the then-unbeaten Jerrod Sanders. He was victorious via submission (rear naked choke) in the second round.

Spoon returned to Bellator where he faced Adam Schindler. Spoon used his speed to his advantage, as he was able to land strikes on Schindler without response. In the final round, Schindler's face was bloodied, although the fight ultimately went to decision, where Spoon prevailed (30–27, 29–28, 29–28).

With that win, Spoon was selected to be part of Bellator's season six featherweight tournament. His quarterfinal opponent was Daniel Mason-Straus. Straus was considered the favourite going into the fight, due to his previous Bellator tournament experience, where he was the runner up of the fourth season featherweight tournament. During the fight, Spoon appeared to be noticeably smaller in stature than his opponent and it showed, as Straus was able to control the clinch and use his greater reach effectively with leg kicks to keep Spoon on the outside. Straus successfully took Spoon down twice and controlled the fight to a decision. Straus won the fight via unanimous decision (30–27, 29–28, 29–28).

Spoon then entered into the season seven featherweight tournament. His quarterfinal opponent was Mike Richman and he lost via a headkick KO in the first round.

Spoon returned to the promotion in 2018 and faced Juan Archuleta on November 30, 2018, at Bellator 210. He lost the fight by unanimous decision.

== Championships and accomplishments ==
- Bricktown Brawl MMA
  - Bricktown Brawl Featherweight Championship (One time)
- King of the Cage
  - KOTC Bantamweight Championship (One time)
- Sugar Creek Showdown
  - SCS Featherweight Championship (One time; current)

== Mixed martial arts record ==
Professional record breakdown
25 matches	20 wins	5 losses
By knockout	1	1
By submission	12	1
By decision	7	3

Res.	Record	Opponent	Method	Event	Date	Round	Time	Location	Notes
Loss	20–5	Juan Archuleta	Decision (unanimous)	Bellator 210	November 30, 2018	3	5:00	Thackerville, Oklahoma, United States	
Loss	20–4	Damon Jackson	Submission (rear-naked choke)	Legacy Fighting Alliance 40	November 30, 2018	2	3:59	Dallas, Texas, United States	
Win	20–3	Ran Weathers	Decision (unanimous)	SCS 32	November 19, 2016	3	1:51	Hinton, Oklahoma, United States	
Win	19–3	Johnnie Roades	Submission	Fists of Fury 7	September 24, 2016	1	1:51	Lawton, Oklahoma, United States	
Win	18–3	Josh Tyler	Decision (unanimous)	SCS 25: Apocalypse	March 28, 2015	5	5:00	Hinton, Oklahoma, United States	Won the SCS Featherweight Championship.
Win	17–3	Rocky Long	Submission (choke)	Rage in the Cage 33	November 14, 2014	1	1:45	Oklahoma City, Oklahoma, United States	
Loss	16–3	Ryan Roberts	Technical Decision (split)	VFC: Fight Night Harrahs	September 12, 2014	3	5:00	Council Bluffs, Iowa, United States	For the VFC Featherweight Championship.
Win	16–2	Cody Carrillo	Submission (rear-naked choke)	Rage in the Cage 30	August 15, 2014	2	3:03	Choctaw, Oklahoma, United States	
Win	15–2	Christopher Brooks	Submission (choke)	Fists of Fury 4	February 15, 2014	1	1:41	Lawton, Oklahoma, United States	
Win	14–2	Chris Coggins	Decision (unanimous)	C3 Fights - Fall Brawl 2013	October 12, 2013	3	5:00	Newkirk, Oklahoma, United States	
Win	13–2	Warren Stewart	Decision (unanimous)	SCS 18 - Declaration of Pain	July 27, 2013	3	5:00	Hinton, Oklahoma, United States	
Loss	12–2	Mike Richman	KO (head kick and punch)	Bellator 76	October 12, 2012	1	0:23	Windsor, Ontario, Canada	Bellator season seven featherweight tournament quarterfinal.
Loss	12–1	Daniel Mason-Straus	Decision (unanimous)	Bellator 60	March 9, 2012	3	5:00	Hammond, Indiana, United States	Bellator season six featherweight tournament quarterfinal.
Win	12–0	Adam Schindler	Decision (unanimous)	Bellator 56	October 29, 2011	3	5:00	Kansas City, Kansas, United States	
Win	11–0	Donald Sanchez	Decision (split)	KOTC: Overdrive	August 20, 2011	5	5:00	Norman, Oklahoma, United States	Won the KOTC Bantamweight Championship.
Win	10–0	Ramiro Hernandez	Decision (unanimous)	Bricktown Brawl 6	June 11, 2011	5	5:00	Oklahoma City, Oklahoma, United States	Won the Bricktown Brawl Featherweight Championship.
Win	9–0	Jerrod Sanders	Submission (rear-naked choke)	Bellator 37	March 19, 2011	2	0:26	Concho, Oklahoma, United States	Lightweight bout.
Win	8–0	Scott Bear	Submission	Apex Martial Arts - Bridge Creek Brawl	October 9, 2010	3	0:31	Oklahoma City, Oklahoma, United States	
Win	7–0	Nathan Torrez	Submission	Bricktown Brawl 5	June 25, 2010	2	2:52	Oklahoma City, Oklahoma, United States	
Win	6–0	Jose Vega	Submission	Bricktown Brawl 4	April 2, 2010	2	4:42	Oklahoma City, Oklahoma, United States	
Win	5–0	Cameron Coffman	Submission (punches)	Bricktown Brawl 3	December 11, 2009	1	1:04	Oklahoma City, Oklahoma, United States	
Win	4–0	Arnulfo Veloquio	Submission	Bricktown Brawl 2	August 28, 2009	1	1:14	Oklahoma City, Oklahoma, United States	
Win	3–0	Chris Barnes	TKO (punches)	Harrah Fight Night	June 27, 2009	1	1:44	Harrah, Oklahoma, United States	
Win	2–0	Nick Masters	Submission (rear naked choke)	Freestyle Cage Fighting 29	March 21, 2009	1	1:47	Claremore, Oklahoma, United States	
Win	1–0	Wes Parkhurst	Submission (punches)	Freestyle Cage Fighting 24	October 4, 2008	1	0:32	Shawnee, Oklahoma, United States	

Awards and achievements
Preceded by Donald Sanchez	9th King of the Cage Bantamweight Champion; March 17, 2012 – 2013	Succeeded by Donald Sanchez
