= Dan Hornbuckle =

Native American mixed martial arts fighter

- Born: Daniel Hornbuckle; December 26, 1980 (age 45); Mahomet, Illinois, U.S.
- Other names: The Handler
- Nationality: Eastern Band Cherokee, Americans
- Height: 1.88 m (6 ft 2 in)
- Weight: 77 kg (170 lb; 12.1 st)
- Division: Middleweight; Welterweight
- Reach: 83.5 in (212 cm)
- Stance: Orthodox
- Team: American Top Team; McVicker's Martial Arts
- Rank: Brown belt in Brazilian Jiu-Jitsu
- Years active: 2006–2014, 2019, 2023

Mixed martial arts record
- Total: 35
- Wins: 26
- By knockout: 11
- By submission: 11
- By decision: 4
- Losses: 9
- By submission: 3
- By decision: 6

Other information
- Mixed martial arts record from Sherdog

Dan Hornbuckle (born December 26, 1980) is an American former mixed martial artist and a citizen of the Eastern Band of Cherokee Indians. A professional since 2006, Hornbuckle has competed for Bellator, Legacy FC, World Victory Road, and DEEP.

== Background ==
Hornbuckle was born in Mahomet, Illinois, and attended Champaign Centennial High School where he competed in wrestling and football. Growing up, he faced adversity being Native American, and was often the victim of racism. He began mixed martial arts when he was 24 years old.

== Mixed martial arts career ==
When he first began fighting, Hornbuckle weighed 215 pounds and received his nickname due to the way he dominated his opponents with very little technique but using his strength and toughness. In the early part of his career, Hornbuckle went 19–2 with significant knockout wins against Akihiro Gono and Nick Thompson in Sengoku. These two wins brought his name to international prominence and launched his career in 2009. On December 17, 2009 Bellator announced the signing of Hornbuckle to a multi-fight Welterweight tournament contract.

At Bellator 15, Hornbuckle defeated Tyler Stinson via first round triangle choke to advance to the semifinals of the Bellator Welterweight Tournament. He then defeated Steve Carl via submission (kimura) at Bellator 19 to advance to the finals of the Bellator Welterweight Tournament. This victory was a candidate for 2010 submission of the year. In the finals, Hornbuckle fought Olympic wrestler, Ben Askren. The fight took place at Bellator 22 on June 17, at the Kansas City Power and Light District in Kansas City, Mo., with Askren winning by unanimous decision. The fight saw Askren implement a dominant top game on the ground that stifled Hornbuckle's bottom game. Hornbuckle made his return to Bellator against former UFC Welterweight Brad Blackburn at Bellator 25 on August 19, 2010. He won the fight via unanimous decision in what was largely a three-round kickboxing battle. Despite being knocked down in the first round, Hornbuckle recovered and won the next two rounds to win a unanimous decision.

Hornbuckle then participated in the Bellator Season Four Welterweight Tournament. In his opening round fight against Brent Weedman at Bellator 35, Hornbuckle lost a unanimous decision, 29–28 on all three judges scorecards. The fight was notably close and the decision was booed by the crowd after being announced. He was scheduled to fight former Bellator Welterweight Champion Lyman Good at Bellator 44, in Atlantic City, New Jersey. However, a hamstring injury forced Lyman Good off the card, and the bout was scrapped. Hornbuckle entered into the Bellator Season Five Welterweight Tournament. He fought Luis Santos in the opening round held at Bellator 49 and lost the fight via unanimous decision.

After losing two consecutive fights in Bellator, Hornbuckle was released from the promotion along with Wilson Reis.

Over a year later, Hornbuckle returned to MMA competition against Pete Spratt on February 1, 2013 at Legacy FC 17. He won the fight via unanimous decision. Hornbuckle then challenged Yuya Shirai for his DEEP Welterweight Championship on April 26, 2013 at DEEP: Impact 62. He won the fight and the title via unanimous decision. In his next outing, Hornbuckle dropped a majority decision to Dennis Hallman on August 30, 2013 at Titan FC 26. He put his DEEP Welterweight Championship on the line against Ryo Chonan at DEEP: Tribe Tokyo Fight on October 20, 2013. He lost the title via unanimous decision. Hornbuckle then faced Dominique Steele at Driven MMA: One on March 1, 2014. Hornbuckle lost the bout via unanimous decision. Hornbuckle faced Roger Carroll at FTP: Fight Time in the Valley on August 9, 2014. He lost the fight via submission in the first round, suffering his fourth consecutive loss.

== Personal life ==
In addition to being a professional mixed martial artist, Hornbuckle works as a fire suppression system installer. He is married and has three daughters. Hornbuckle opened his own academy, American Top Team WarHawks, in Mahomet, Illinois.

== Championships and accomplishments ==
- Bellator MMA
  - Bellator Season Two Welterweight Tournament Runner Up
- DEEP
  - DEEP Welterweight Championship (One time)

== Mixed martial arts record ==
Professional record breakdown
35 matches	26 wins	9 losses
By knockout	11	0
By submission	11	3
By decision	4	6

Res.	Record	Opponent	Method	Event	Date	Round	Time	Location	Notes
Win	26–9	Dan Stittgen	TKO (retirement)	Caged Aggression 35: The Trilogy Night 2	March 24, 2023	1	5:00	Davenport, Iowa, United States	Middleweight debut. Won the vacant CAMMA Middleweight Championship.
Win	25–9	Jacon Luock	KO (punch)	Caged Aggression 24: Champions Night 2	March 23, 2019	2	3:37	San Antonio, Texas, United States	Won the CAMMA Welterweight Championship.
Loss	24–9	Roger Carroll	Submission (choke)	FTP: Fight Time in the Valley	August 9, 2014	1	4:37	Marble, North Carolina, United States	
Loss	24–8	Dominique Steele	Decision (unanimous)	Driven MMA: One	March 1, 2014	3	5:00	Canton, Ohio, United States	
Loss	24–7	Ryo Chonan	Decision (unanimous)	DEEP: Tribe Tokyo Fight	October 20, 2013	3	5:00	Tokyo, Japan	Lost the DEEP Welterweight Championship.
Loss	24–6	Dennis Hallman	Decision (majority)	Titan FC 26	August 30, 2013	3	5:00	Kansas City, Missouri, United States	
Win	24–5	Yuya Shirai	Decision (unanimous)	DEEP: Impact 62	April 26, 2013	3	5:00	Tokyo, Japan	Won the DEEP Welterweight Championship.
Win	23–5	Pete Spratt	Decision (unanimous)	Legacy FC 17	February 1, 2013	3	5:00	San Antonio, Texas, United States	
Loss	22–5	Luis Santos	Decision (unanimous)	Bellator 49	September 10, 2011	3	5:00	Atlantic City, New Jersey, United States	Welterweight Tournament Quarterfinal.
Loss	22–4	Brent Weedman	Decision (unanimous)	Bellator 35	March 5, 2011	3	5:00	Lemoore, California, United States	Welterweight Tournament Quarterfinal.
Win	22–3	Brad Blackburn	Decision (unanimous)	Bellator 25	August 19, 2010	3	5:00	Chicago, Illinois, United States	
Loss	21–3	Ben Askren	Decision (unanimous)	Bellator 22	June 17, 2010	3	5:00	Kansas City, Missouri, United States	Welterweight Tournament Final.
Win	21–2	Steve Carl	Submission (kimura)	Bellator 19	May 20, 2010	1	2:31	Grand Prairie, Texas, United States	Welterweight Tournament Semifinal.
Win	20–2	Tyler Stinson	Submission (triangle choke)	Bellator 15	April 22, 2010	1	2:03	Uncasville, Connecticut, United States	Welterweight Tournament Quarterfinal.
Win	19–2	Nick Thompson	TKO (punches)	World Victory Road Presents: Sengoku 10	September 23, 2009	2	1:30	Saitama, Saitama, Japan	
Win	18–2	Akihiro Gono	KO (head kick)	World Victory Road Presents: Sengoku 9	August 2, 2009	3	2:50	Saitama, Saitama, Japan	
Win	17–2	Joe Alexander	KO (punches)	TFC: Hornbuckle vs. Alexander	February 21, 2009	1	0:46	Hammond, Indiana, United States	
Win	16–2	Nabil Khatib	Submission (rear-naked choke)	Raw Combat: Resurrection	June 20, 2008	1	3:58	Calgary, Alberta, Canada	
Loss	15–2	Mike Pyle	Submission (triangle choke)	World Victory Road Presents: Sengoku 2	May 18, 2008	1	4:52	Tokyo, Japan	
Win	15–1	Andrew Buckland	Submission (armbar)	HCF: Crow's Nest	March 29, 2008	1	3:34	Gatineau, Quebec, Canada	
Win	14–1	Courtney Ray	Submission (armbar)	HOOKnSHOOT: BODOGFight Women's Tournament	November 24, 2007	1	1:25	Evansville, Indiana, United States	
Win	13–1	Piotr Jakaczynski	KO (head kick)	BodogFIGHT: Vancouver	August 25, 2007	1	1:53	Vancouver, British Columbia, Canada	
Win	12–1	Matt Shaw	Submission (arm-triangle choke)	Total Fight Challenge 8	April 28, 2007	2	2:53	Hammond, Indiana, United States	
Win	11–1	Courtney Ray	TKO (punches)	HOOKnSHOOT: Live	March 24, 2007	1	2:49	Evansville, Indiana, United States	
Win	10–1	Jamie Toney	Decision (unanimous)	HOOKnSHOOT: Live	March 24, 2007	3	5:00	Evansville, Indiana, United States	
Win	9–1	Wayne Bogard	Submission (armbar)	HOOKnSHOOT: Live	March 24, 2007	1	2:34	Evansville, Indiana, United States	
Win	8–1	Alex Carter	Submission (arm-triangle choke)	Total Fight Challenge 7	February 10, 2007	1	0:35	Hammond, Indiana, United States	
Win	7–1	Brent Weedman	Submission (triangle choke)	LOF 12: Black Tie Battles	December 31, 2006	2	3:31	Indianapolis, Indiana, United States	
Win	6–1	Max Fowler	Submission (verbal)	CFC 1: Explosion	December 16, 2006	1	0:30	Tinley Park, Illinois, United States	
Win	5–1	Wayne Bogard	Submission (arm-triangle choke)	IHC 11: Apocalypse	November 18, 2006	1	0:36	Hammond, Indiana, United States	
Win	4–1	Justin Wilcox	TKO (punches)	Total Fight Challenge 6	September 9, 2006	1	1:20	Hammond, Indiana, United States	
Win	3–1	Andy Normington	KO (punches)	Madtown Throwdown 8	July 15, 2006	N/A	N/A	Madison, Wisconsin, United States	
Loss	2–1	Nate Homme	Submission (triangle choke)	Madtown Throwdown 8	July 15, 2006	N/A	N/A	Madison, Wisconsin, United States	
Win	2–0	Steve Conley	TKO (punches)	Duneland Classic 4	June 17, 2006	1	N/A	Portage, Indiana, United States	
Win	1–0	Mike Bodziak	TKO (punches)	Total Fight Challenge 5	February 18, 2006	1	N/A	Hammond, Indiana, United States	
