= Tyler Stinson =

American mixed martial arts fighter

- Born: January 17, 1986 (age 40); Winfield, Kansas, United States
- Other names: The Evolution
- Height: 6 ft 3 in (1.91 m)
- Weight: 170 lb (77 kg; 12 st)
- Division: Middleweight; Welterweight
- Reach: 75.5 in (192 cm)
- Stance: Southpaw
- Fighting out of: Wheat Ridge, Colorado, United States
- Team: Grudge Training Center
- Years active: 2006-2016; 2023

Mixed martial arts record
- Total: 41
- Wins: 31
- By knockout: 19
- By submission: 8
- By decision: 4
- Losses: 10
- By knockout: 1
- By submission: 5
- By decision: 4

Other information
- Mixed martial arts record from Sherdog

Tyler Stinson (born January 17, 1986) is an American mixed martial artist and professional wrestler. A professional competitor since 2006, Stinson has also formerly competed for Bellator MMA, Strikeforce, Titan FC, and the World Series of Fighting.

== Background ==
Born and raised in Winfield, Kansas, Stinson competed in baseball, football, and track and field at Winfield High School, and was talented. Stinson was introduced to MMA by a friend at the age of 20, which piqued his interest. Less than a week later, Stinson began competing himself.

== Mixed martial arts career ==
=== Early career ===
Stinson started his career in 2006. From his mixed martial arts debut until the beginning of 2010, he fought mainly for southern American promotions, as C3 Fights, Art of Fighting and Masters of the Cage.

Stinson compiled a record of 17-5 before signing with Bellator. Stinson earned his contract at an open tryout held by Bellator in Kansas.

=== Bellator ===
Stinson was expected to make his debut against Demi Deeds on April 29, 2010, at Bellator 16. However, he was called to replace an injured Sean Pierson against Dan Hornbuckle in the Season Two Welterweight Tournament Quarterfinal on April 22, 2010, at Bellator 15. Stinson lost via submission in the first round.

Stinson faced Leonardo Peçanha on June 17, 2010, at Bellator 22 in a rematch of a fight that took place in 2008. Stinson won via submission due to a rear-naked choke in the first round.

Stinson replaced Rory Markham against Steve Carl for a spot in Season Four Welterweight Tournament on August 26, 2010, at Bellator 26. Stinson lost via technical submission in the first round.

Stinson faced Nate James on April 9, 2011, at Bellator 40. He won via split decision (29-28 Stinson, 29-28 James, 29-28 Stinson).

Stinson was expected to face Joey Gorczynski on May 7, 2011, at Bellator 43. However, for undisclosed reasons the match was scrapped.

=== Strikeforce ===
Stinson made his debut against Eduardo Pamplona on July 30, 2011, at Strikeforce: Fedor vs. Henderson. He won via knockout at 15 seconds of round one.

Stinson faced Tarec Saffiedine on January 7, 2012, at Strikeforce: Rockhold vs. Jardine. Saffiedine defeated Stinson via split decision (29-28 Stinson, 30-27 Saffiedine, 29-28 Saffiedine).

Stinson faced Jordan Mein on July 14, 2012, at Strikeforce: Rockhold vs. Kennedy. Stinson lost via unanimous decision (30-27, 30-27, 30-27).

=== World Series of Fighting ===
In December 2013, it was announced that Stinson signed a four-fight deal with World Series of Fighting. He made his debut on January 18, 2014, against Valdir Araujo at WSOF 8 and won via TKO in the third round.

On March 29, 2014, Stinson fought former UFC veteran Josh Burkman at WSOF 9 and lost via knockout in the first round. This was the first knockout loss of Stinson's career.

== Mixed martial arts record ==
Professional record breakdown
41 matches	31 wins	10 losses
By knockout	19	1
By submission	8	5
By decision	4	4

Res.	Record	Opponent	Method	Event	Date	Round	Time	Location	Notes
Win	31–10	Marco Hutch	Technical Submission (triangle choke)	Synergy FC 8	October 14, 2023	1	1:00	Springfield, Missouri, United States	Middleweight debut; won the vacant Synergy FC Middleweight Championship.
Win	30–10	Dave Burrow	Decision (split)	C3 Fights: Fight Night	July 16, 2016	3	5:00	Newkirk, Oklahoma, United States	
Win	29–10	Jose Figueroa	Decision (split)	Titan FC 31	October 31, 2014	3	5:00	Tampa, Florida, United States	
Loss	28–10	Joshua Burkman	KO (punch)	WSOF 9	March 29, 2014	1	2:15	Las Vegas, Nevada, United States	
Win	28–9	Valdir Araujo	TKO (punches)	WSOF 8	January 18, 2014	3	2:23	Hollywood, Florida, United States	
Win	27–9	Armando Montoya Jr.	TKO (punches)	Prize Fighting Championship 4	October 18, 2013	1	3:38	Denver, Colorado, United States	
Win	26–9	Rob Kimmons	TKO (punches)	Epic Fight Night 1: Stinson vs. Kimmons	June 29, 2013	1	0:54	Kansas City, Missouri, United States	
Win	25–9	Zac Kelley	KO (punch)	C3 Fights: Armageddon 2012	December 1, 2012	1	4:34	Newkirk, Oklahoma, United States	
Loss	24–9	Jordan Mein	Decision (unanimous)	Strikeforce: Rockhold vs. Kennedy	July 14, 2012	3	5:00	Portland, Oregon, United States	
Loss	24–8	Tarec Saffiedine	Decision (split)	Strikeforce: Rockhold vs. Jardine	January 7, 2012	3	5:00	Las Vegas, Nevada, United States	
Win	24–7	Ryan Bixler	Submission (triangle choke)	C3 Fights: Fall Brawl	October 22, 2011	1	2:54	Newkirk, Oklahoma, United States	
Win	23–7	Eduardo Pamplona	KO (punch)	Strikeforce: Fedor vs. Henderson	July 30, 2011	1	0:15	Hoffman Estates, Illinois, United States	
Win	22–7	Nate James	Decision (split)	Bellator 40	April 9, 2011	3	5:00	Newkirk, Oklahoma, United States	
Win	21–7	Matt Delanoit	KO (punch)	C3 Fights: SlamFest	January 29, 2011	1	3:56	Newkirk, Oklahoma, United States	
Loss	20–7	Steve Carl	Technical submission (guillotine choke)	Bellator 26	August 26, 2010	1	2:30	Kansas City, Missouri, United States	175 lb Catchweight; Bellator Season Four Welterweight Tournament Qualifier.
Win	20–6	Mike Jackson	KO (punches)	C3 Fights: Slammin Jammin Weekend 5	August 7, 2010	3	3:42	Newkirk, Oklahoma, United States	
Win	19–6	Leonardo Peçanha	Submission (rear-naked choke)	Bellator 22	June 17, 2010	1	1:42	Kansas City, Missouri, United States	
Loss	18–6	Dan Hornbuckle	Submission (triangle choke)	Bellator 15	April 22, 2010	1	2:03	Uncasville, Connecticut, United States	Bellator Season Two Welterweight Tournament Quarterfinal.
Win	18–5	Jerome Martinez	Submission (armbar)	C3 Fights: Slammin Jammin Weekend 4	February 13, 2010	1	1:47	Newkirk, Oklahoma, United States	
Win	17–5	Brandon Newsome	Submission (triangle choke)	Titan FC 14	October 2, 2009	1	1:57	Kansas City, Kansas, United States	
Win	16–5	Matt Bean	TKO (punches)	C3 Fights: Slammin Jammin Weekend 1	September 18, 2009	1	2:16	Newkirk, Oklahoma, United States	
Loss	15–5	Delson Heleno	Submission (triangle choke)	AOF 4: Damage	August 22, 2009	1	4:44	Tampa, Florida, United States	
Win	15–4	Yasubey Enomoto	TKO (punches)	AOF 3: Rumble at Robarts	June 13, 2009	3	1:59	Sarasota, Florida, United States	
Win	14–4	Drew Fickett	TKO (punches)	C3 Fights	February 28, 2009	1	3:35	Newkirk, Oklahoma, United States	
Win	13–4	Jeff Davis	TKO (punches)	Havic Prizefighting: Downtown Throwdown 2	November 22, 2008	1	2:09	Wichita, Kansas, United States	
Win	12–4	Eric Marriott	Decision (unanimous)	Mixed Martial Madness	October 17, 2008	3	5:00	Wichita, Kansas, United States	
Loss	11–4	Leonardo Peçanha	Submission (triangle choke)	C3 Fights: Clash in Concho	September 19, 2008	1	N/A	Concho, Oklahoma, United States	
Win	11–3	Cory Brandt	TKO (punches)	C3 Fights: Showdown 2	August 16, 2008	1	0:33	Cherokee, North Carolina, United States	
Win	10–3	Dominic Brown	Submission	Good Guys Promotions	August 15, 2008	1	4:35	Junction City, Kansas, United States	
Win	9–3	Bill Albrecht	TKO (punches)	LFC 1: The Genesis	May 10, 2008	1	0:16	Wichita, Kansas, United States	
Win	8–3	Joseph Sullivan	TKO (punches)	Independent Event	March 29, 2008	1	0:32	Wichita, Kansas, United States	
Loss	7–3	Anthony Lapsley	Submission (triangle choke)	Midwest Cage Combat	November 2, 2007	2	3:39	Wichita, Kansas, United States	
Win	7–2	Ken Jackson	TKO (injury)	IFO: Wiuff vs. Salmon	September 1, 2007	1	2:24	Las Vegas, Nevada, United States	
Win	6–2	Tony Barker	KO (punch)	IFO: Eastman vs. Kimmons	July 7, 2007	2	4:45	Las Vegas, Nevada, United States	
Win	5–2	Matt Priest	KO (punch)	Midwest Cage Combat	June 23, 2007	1	0:10	Wichita, Kansas, United States	
Loss	4–2	Joe Bunch	Decision (unanimous)	Masters of the Cage 12	March 17, 2007	3	5:00	Norman, Oklahoma, United States	
Win	4–1	Dominic Brown	KO (punch)	Good Guys Promotions	February 10, 2007	1	4:35	Wichita, Kansas, United States	
Win	3–1	Quinton McCottrell	KO (punch)	Masters of the Cage 9	January 20, 2007	1	0:09	Norman, Oklahoma, United States	
Win	2–1	Mike Messina	Submission	Masters of the Cage 4	September 23, 2006	2	2:25	Oklahoma City, Oklahoma, United States	
Win	1–1	Kevin Adams	TKO (punches)	Masters of the Cage 3	August 19, 2006	2	1:12	Oklahoma City, Oklahoma, United States	
Loss	0–1	Kevin Adams	Decision (split)	Masters of the Cage 2	July 14, 2006	3	5:00	Oklahoma City, Oklahoma, United States	

== See also ==
- List of male mixed martial artists
