= Joe Duarte =

Guam martial artist

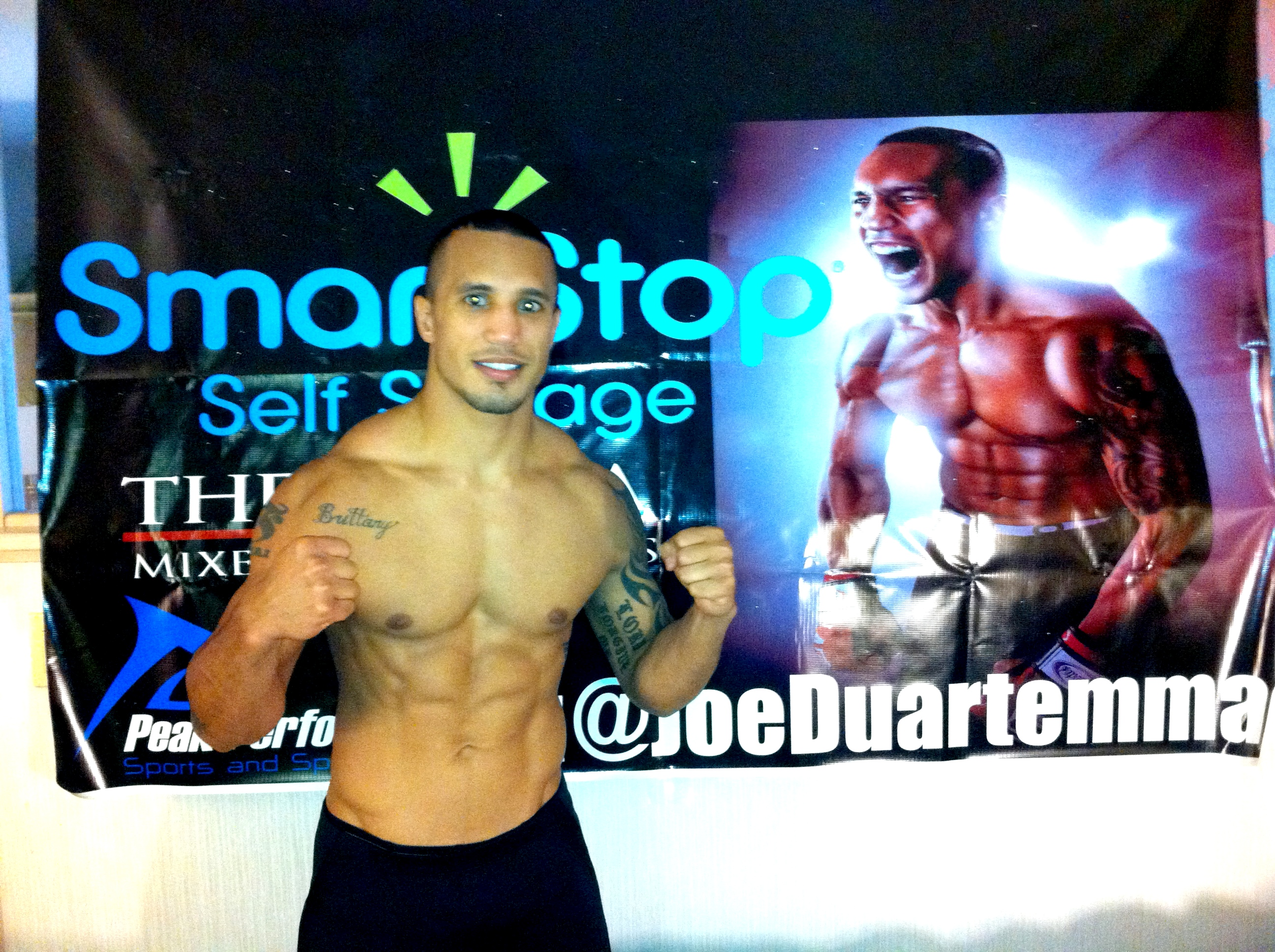
- Born: August 4, 1983 (age 43); Dededo, Guam
- Other names: Hybrid
- Nationality: Guamanian (Overseas American)
- Height: 5 ft 9 in (1.75 m)
- Weight: 155–170 lb (70–77 kg; 11.1–12.1 st)
- Division: Lightweight
- Reach: 74 in (188 cm)
- Fighting out of: San Diego, California, U.S.
- Team: The Arena
- Rank: Black Belt in Brazilian Jiu Jitsu
- Years active: 2006-2017

Mixed martial arts record
- Total: 21
- Wins: 17
- By knockout: 10
- By submission: 5
- By decision: 2
- Losses: 4
- By knockout: 3
- By decision: 1

Joe Duarte (born August 4, 1983) is a retired professional mixed martial arts champion and investor from Guam, and is of native Chamorro descent.

== Early life ==
Duarte grew up in the village of Dededo, the largest and most densely populated village on Guam. Actively involved in sports since the age of six, he helped lead several youth sporting organizations to their respective league championships and was also an avid mountain biker and waterman. He became involved in combat sports after being introduced to freestyle/folkstyle wrestling as an eighth-grade student at F.B. Leon Guerrero Middle School where he occasionally trained in western boxing.

From 1997-2001, Duarte attended Simon A. Sanchez High School in Yigo, Guam where he continued to do well in athletics. During this time, he earned various accomplishments competing in the DODEA Far East High Schools Wrestling Championships and winning multiple team championships in varsity football, track and field, and men's soccer in his senior year.

Duarte began his mixed martial arts training early in high school. Duarte began training in submission grappling and Brazilian Jiu-Jitsu at Purebred Shooto Guam in Hagatna, Guam in 1999. Although a natural athlete with training as a wrestler, Duarte soon learned that the striking game was his key forte.

Upon graduation from high school in 2001, Duarte dabbled in the local MMA scene that was still a fledgling sport with only a handful of local fighters fighting in the Shooto organization. After working a couple of odd jobs and playing community league football, Duarte took a chance and decided to leave home in search of better opportunities in the U.S. mainland, Duarte left Guam for Kingsville, Texas in 2002.

After leaving Guam, he made his way to Texas where he lived with his brother who was serving in the United States Navy at the time. While in Texas, Duarte started training at a community boxing gym in Corpus Christi, Texas.

== Military service ==
After his arrival in Texas, Duarte enlisted in the U.S. Army as an infantryman in 2002.

Upon completion of One Station Unit Training, Duarte earned his parachutist wings. He was assigned to the 3rd Ranger Battalion, 75th Ranger Regiment in Fort Benning, Georgia. Duarte served multiple deployments of duty in Iraq from 2003 to 2005 where he served as a team leader resulting in the loss of a close friend, Dean Richardson, during a firefight in Iraq's Sunni Triangle. A physical altercation at regiment with a team leader resulted in Duarte transferring to serve with 1-41 Infantry Regiment(MECH)of the 3rd Brigade Combat Team, 1st Armored Division out of Fort Riley, Kansas.

== Mixed martial arts career ==
Duarte made his professional mixed martial arts (MMA) debut as a light heavyweight on September 9, 2006 at "Total Combat 16: Annihilation" in San Diego. He fought a three-round regulation match against Chris Kennedy and secured a split decision victory. His next fight took place in the inaugural "Unleashed Fight/GP Galaxy" fight promotion as a lightweight where he won a first round submission victory via armbar over Randy Bowers. He is the sole Unleashed Fight Lightweight champion with his first-round rear naked choke submission victory over Ulfrano Rodriguez on March 22, 2008.

Duarte appeared on "The Ultimate Fighter" (TUF) reality show against Phillipe Nover, who submitted Duarte via rear naked choke in the second round. Considered exhibition contests, the fights on TUF are not reflected upon a professional fighter's official record and thus Duarte remained undefeated in professional MMA competition (at that time) and improved his record to 4-0 with another submission victory over Pierre Dumont at "Colleseo Championship Fighting II: King of the Streets" on October 24, 2008. Duarte's next fight was against Kenny Raught at "Colloseo Championship Fighting III: Undisputed" on November 28, 2008 in Edmonton, Alberta, Canada. Duarte dominated the entire fight from the sound of the bell until out of sheer desperation, Raught winged a right hand that caught Duarte on the chin to give him his first loss of his professional career. On May 30, 2009, Duarte earned his fifth career victory with a first round TKO stoppage of David Gardner in the WarGods promotion held at the Viejas Casino in Alpine, California.

On April 8, 2010, Duarte fought in the second season of the Bellator Fighting Championships. With less than a week's notice, Duarte was to take on former collegiate wrestler Carey Vanier in the quarterfinal round of the Bellator Fighting Championships lightweight tournament. Duarte stepped into the cage at 156 lbs. after losing much of the weight within a 48-hour window. (Finnish fighter, Janne Turlinta, was not able to procure the necessary visa to fight in the United States, so Duarte was called in.) Duarte controlled much of the stand-up battle and consistently made the scramble back up to his feet after several takedown attempts by Vanier. Although visibly weakened by the rapid weight cut, Duarte continued to maneuver against Vanier but could not find an opportunity to effectively neutralize the takedown offense of Vanier, who grounded Duarte and worked to pass from Duarte's full guard. Varnier eventually worked into the side control position and continued to rain down punches before the referee called an end to the fight at the 4:14 mark in the third round.

On August 12, 2011, Duarte marked another milestone in his storied fight career by fighting in Strikeforce Mixed Martial Arts' Challenger Series. Headlining as the Lightweight Main Event of the evening at the Pearl at the Palms Casino in Las Vegas, Nevada, Duarte squared off against Brazilian Jiu jitsu black belt and UFC veteran, Jorge Gurgel. The fight was an excitingly rich stand-up battle with Duarte and Gurgel eager to square up in the middle of the cage trading blows. Duarte's blows to Gurgel's body and face quickly increased Gurgel sense of urgency and attempts at takedowns and swift body kicks to slow Duarte's pace. Duarte continued control much of the tempo of the fight skillfully controlling Gurgel and with well placed jabs and body shots. In the third and final round, Gurgel came out with a frenzied attack trying to stifle Duarte's offensive play. Muscling for a takedown, Gurgel landed under Duarte's mount and quickly spun to his butterfly guard. Well aware of the threat, Duarte kept the action close and controlled Gurgel's posturing from guard. Toward the end of the round, Duarte got back to his feet and Gurgel quickly followed. As Gurgel began to press forward and engage, Duarte capitalized by shooting for a double leg takedown and slamming Gurgel to the mat and continued to work body shots until the final buzzer sounded signaling the end of the final round. Thereby, Duarte earned the unanimous decision over Gurgel with all three judges scoring the bout 30-27, 29-28 respectively.

On July 14, 2012, Duarte made a return to competition after almost a year long hiatus due to injury in the preliminaries of Strikeforce: Rockhold vs. Kennedy held at the Rose Garden in Portland, Oregon. Coming off a five-fight winning streak since garnering a loss against Carey Varnier at Bellator Fighting Championships 13, Duarte stood ready to face Ryan Couture, the son of the former UFC Heavyweight champion, Light Heavyweight, and Hall of Famer, Randy Couture. Ryan Couture was also coming of a win streak of his own after taking the majority decision over Maka Watson and earning a TKO win over former International Fight League standout, Conor Heun. Duarte tried to be aggressive toward Couture by taking the middle of the cage and exploiting multiple angles of attack but none worked. Duarte would lose the bout via Split Decision.

In his next bout, Duarte faced Saad Awad at Bellator 122 on July 25, 2014, in a rematch from their 2011 bout. Despite rocking Awad early, Duarte lost via TKO due to elbows in the first round.

== Mixed martial arts record ==
Professional record breakdown
| 21 matches | 17 wins | 4 losses |
| By knockout | 10 | 3 |
| By submission | 5 | 0 |
| By decision | 2 | 1 |

| Res. | Record | Opponent | Method | Event | Date | Round | Time | Location | Notes |
|---|---|---|---|---|---|---|---|---|---|
| Loss | 17–4 | Saad Awad | TKO (elbows) | Bellator 122 | July 25, 2014 | 1 | 1:18 | Temecula, California, United States | |
| Loss | 17–3 | Ryan Couture | Decision (split) | Strikeforce: Rockhold vs. Kennedy | July 14, 2012 | 3 | 5:00 | Portland, Oregon, United States | |
| Win | 17–2 | Jorge Gurgel | Decision (unanimous) | Strikeforce Challengers: Gurgel vs. Duarte | August 12, 2011 | 3 | 5:00 | Las Vegas, Nevada, United States | |
| Win | 16–2 | Saad Awad | Submission (armbar) | Strikeforce: Diaz vs. Daley | April 9, 2011 | 2 | 2:45 | San Diego, California, United States | |
| Win | 15–2 | Amando Viramontes | Submission (strikes) | NFC Native Fighting Championships | November 5, 2010 | 1 | 1:12 | San Diego, California, United States | |
| Win | 14–2 | Pablo Diaz | KO (punch) | NFC Native Fighting Championships | August 13, 2010 | 1 | 19 sec | San Diego, California, United States | |
| Win | 13–2 | Kevin Blackwell | TKO (elbows and punches) | NFC Native Fighting Championships | July 9, 2010 | 1 | 1:15 | San Diego, California, United States | |
| Loss | 12–2 | Carey Vanier | TKO (punches) | Bellator 13 | April 8, 2010 | 3 | 4:14 | Hollywood, Florida, United States | |
| Win | 12–1 | David Gardner | TKO (punches) | War Gods 5 | May 30, 2009 | 1 | 2:41 | San Diego, California, United States | |
| Loss | 11–1 | Kenny Raught | TKO (punches) | CCF 3: Undisputed | November 28, 2008 | 1 | 3:07 | Edmonton, Alberta, Canada | |
| Win | 11–0 | Pierre Dumont | Submission (rear-naked choke) | CCF 2: King of the Streets | October 24, 2008 | 1 | 1:11 | Edmonton, Alberta, Canada | |
| Win | 10–0 | Ulfrano Rodriguez | Submission (rear naked choke) | Unleashed Fight II: Showdown in Cali | March 22, 2008 | 1 | 1:27 | San Diego, California, United States | |
| Win | 9–0 | Randy Bowers | Submission (armbar) | Galaxy Productions | August 24, 2007 | 1 | 2:47 | San Diego, California, United States | |
| Win | 8–0 | Chris Kennedy | Decision (split) | TC 16: Annihilation | September 9, 2006 | 3 | 5:00 | San Diego, California, United States | |
