= Jose Vega (fighter) =

American mixed martial arts fighter

- Born: September 9, 1985 (age 41); Miami, Florida, United States
- Height: 5 ft 6 in (1.68 m)
- Weight: 136 lb (62 kg; 9.7 st)
- Division: Bantamweight
- Reach: 66.0 in (168 cm)
- Fighting out of: Knob Noster, Missouri, United States
- Team: First Blood MMA
- Years active: 2008–present

Mixed martial arts record
- Total: 16
- Wins: 9
- By knockout: 1
- By submission: 7
- By decision: 1
- Losses: 7
- By knockout: 1
- By submission: 4
- By decision: 2

Other information
- Mixed martial arts record from Sherdog

Jose Vega (born September 9, 1985) is an American mixed martial artist currently competing in the bantamweight division. A professional competitor since 2008, Vega has formerly competed for Bellator Fighting Championships and Titan Fighting Championship.

== Mixed martial arts career ==
=== Bellator Fighting Championships ===
After going 7–3 in smaller promotions, Vega signed with Bellator. He made his debut for the promotion at Bellator 22 on June 17, 2010 against Jarrod Card. He was victorious via a first-round knockout, which earned him a spot in the Bellator season 3 bantamweight tournament.

Vega faced Danny Tims in the quarterfinals at Bellator 26 on August 26, 2010. He won the fight via unanimous decision. In the semifinals, Vega faced Ed West at Bellator 30 on September 23, 2010. He lost the fight via split decision.

Vega faced Chase Beebe in a Bellator season 5 bantamweight tournament qualifier bout at Bellator 43 on May 7, 2011. He lost the fight via guillotine choke submission in the first round.

=== Titan Fighting Championship ===
Vega faced Andrew Whitney at Titan Fighting Championship 22 on May 25, 2012. He lost the fight via knockout in the first round, which marked the first knockout loss of his professional career.

Vega faced Adam Stickey at Titan Fighting Championship 24 on August 24, 2012. He was defeated via triangle choke submission in the first round, suffering his fourth consecutive loss in the process.

== Mixed martial arts record ==
Professional record breakdown
16 matches	9 wins	7 losses
By knockout	1	1
By submission	7	4
By decision	1	2
Draws	0	

Res.	Record	Opponent	Method	Event	Date	Round	Time	Location	Notes
Loss	9–7	Adam Stickey	Submission (triangle choke)	Titan Fighting Championship 24	August 24, 2012	1	3:23	Kansas City, Kansas, United States	
Loss	9–6	Andrew Whitney	KO (punches)	Titan Fighting Championship 22	May 25, 2012	1	2:55	Kansas City, Kansas, United States	
Loss	9–5	Chase Beebe	Submission (guillotine choke)	Bellator 43	May 7, 2011	1	4:06	Newkirk, Oklahoma, United States	Bellator season 5 bantamweight tournament qualifier.
Loss	9–4	Ed West	Decision (split)	Bellator 30	September 23, 2010	3	5:00	Louisville, Kentucky, United States	Bellator season 3 bantamweight tournament semifinal.
Win	9–3	Danny Tims	Decision (unanimous)	Bellator 26	August 26, 2010	3	5:00	Kansas City, Missouri, United States	Bellator season 3 bantamweight tournament quarterfinal.
Win	8–3	Jarrod Card	KO (punch)	Bellator 22	June 17, 2010	1	0:39	Kansas City, Missouri, United States	Catchweight (140 lbs) bout.
Loss	7–3	Jeremy Spoon	Submission	Bricktown Brawl 4	April 2, 2010	2	4:42	Oklahoma City, Oklahoma, United States	
Loss	7–2	Tommy Lee	Decision (unanimous)	PB MMA: Live Saturday Night	August 22, 2009	3	5:00	Springdale, Arkansas, United States	
Win	7–1	Larry DiGiulio	Submission (triangle choke)	First Blood	August 8, 2009	2	2:57	Lake Ozark, Missouri, United States	
Loss	6–1	Josh Rave	Submission (armbar)	Fuel Fight Club	April 10, 2009	3	1:53	Lake Ozark, Missouri, United States	
Win	6–0	Kevin Croom	Submission	Hulett Productions: First Blood	February 7, 2009	2	2:22	Sedalia, Missouri, United States	
Win	5–0	Cody Bell	Submission	XF: X-Treme Fight 1	January 23, 2009	2	4:30	Kansas City, Missouri, United States	
Win	4–0	Carson Gainey	Submission (rear-naked choke)	MMA Big Show: Relentless	November 1, 2008	1	2:27	Covington, Kentucky, United States	
Win	3–0	Danny Tims	Submission	IFC: Sturgis 2008	August 7, 2008	2	3:00	Sturgis, South Dakota, United States	
Win	2–0	Eric Buck	Submission (rear-naked choke)	IFC: Sturgis 2008	August 7, 2008	1	4:50	Sturgis, South Dakota, United States	
Win	1–0	Chris Journigan	Submission (hammerlock)	IFC: Sturgis 2008	August 4, 2008	1	1:40	Sturgis, South Dakota, United States	
