= Ryan Thomas (fighter) =

American martial artist (born 1984)

- Born: November 5, 1984 (age 41); Danville, Illinois, United States
- Other names: The Tank Engine
- Nationality: American
- Height: 6 ft 0 in (1.83 m)
- Weight: 184.5 lb (83.7 kg; 13.18 st)
- Division: Welterweight; Middleweight
- Reach: 75.0
- Stance: Orthodox
- Fighting out of: Coconut Creek, Florida
- Team: American Top Team
- Rank: Black Belt in Brazilian Jiu-Jitsu under Ricardo Liborio
- Years active: 2007–2015 (MMA)

Mixed martial arts record
- Total: 28
- Wins: 20
- By knockout: 8
- By submission: 11
- By decision: 1
- Losses: 8
- By submission: 5
- By decision: 3

Other information
- Mixed martial arts record from Sherdog

Ryan Drew Thomas (born November 5, 1984) is an American mixed martial artist. He was a two-time national qualifier in college wrestling at Waubonsee Community College before transferring to Eastern Illinois University, where he wrestled at the NCAA Division I level and earned a bachelor's degree in elementary education.

== Mixed martial arts career ==
After completing his collegiate wrestling career, Thomas compiled a 4–0 amateur record, winning the 16-man “Iowa Meanest Man Tournament” in Davenport, Iowa. Following his undefeated amateur run, he turned professional, competing initially at middleweight before moving to the welterweight division. His early success on the regional circuit eventually propelled him to a short-notice debut in the Ultimate Fighting Championship in 2008.

=== Ultimate Fighting Championship ===
Thomas made his UFC debut at UFC 87: Seek and Destroy after stepping in on 12 days' notice to replace the injured Jared Rollins in a bout against Ben Saunders. Thomas lost the fight via submission (armbar) in the second round.

Thomas was originally scheduled to fight Matt Riddle at UFC 91, but Riddle withdrew due to injury. Thomas instead faced Matt Brown, who stepped in as a replacement opponent. Thomas lost the bout by armbar submission in the second round, and he was released from the promotion following the bout.

=== Bellator Fighting Championships ===
In April 2010, Thomas signed with Bellator and entered the promotion's Season Two Welterweight Tournament. He lost his first bout with Ben Askren at Bellator 14 via first-round stoppage in what was considered a controversial finish.

After Jim Wallhead withdrew from the tournament, Thomas was reinserted into the bracket and faced Jacob McClintock at Bellator 15, winning by first-round TKO to advance to a semifinal rematch with Askren. Thomas lost the rematch at Bellator 19 via unanimous decision, with all three judges scoring the bout 30–27 for Askren.

Thomas later faced Wallhead on October 14, 2010, at Bellator 32, losing by unanimous decision.

== Championships and accomplishments ==
- Colosseum Combat
  - CC Welterweight Championship (Two times)
  - Interim CC Welterweight Championship (One time)
- Courage Fighting Championships
  - CFC Welterweight Championship (One time)

== Mixed martial arts record ==
Professional record breakdown
28 matches	20 wins	8 losses
By knockout	8	0
By submission	11	5
By decision	1	3

Res.	Record	Opponent	Method	Event	Date	Round	Time	Location	Notes
Win	20–8	Roger Carroll	Decision (unanimous)	Ring of Dreams: Fight Night 16	May 9, 2015	3	5:00	Winston-Salem, North Carolina, United States	
Win	19–8	William Hill	TKO (doctor stoppage)	Hoosier Fight Club 23	February 7, 2015	3	4:35	Valparaiso, Indiana, United States	Returned to Middleweight.
Win	18–8	Joshua Thorpe	TKO (punches)	Colosseum Combat 30	October 11, 2014	1	4:06	Kokomo, Indiana, United States	Defended CC Welterweight Championship.
Loss	17–8	Dominique Steele	Decision (unanimous)	XFC 27: Frozen Fury	December 13, 2013	3	5:00	Muskegon, Michigan, United States	
Win	17–7	Rocky France	Submission (triangle choke)	XFC 25: Boiling Point	September 6, 2013	2	1:27	Albuquerque, New Mexico, United States	
Win	16–7	Rocky France	TKO (retirement)	Colosseum Combat 25	June 1, 2013	3	5:00	Kokomo, Indiana, United States	Defended CC Welterweight Championship.
Win	15–7	Corey Hill	Submission (armbar)	XFC 21: Night of Champions 2	December 7, 2012	1	2:34	Nashville, Tennessee, United States	
Win	14–7	Evilasio Silva Araujo	Submission (punches)	AF - Arena Fight Mossoro	March 8, 2012	1	2:30	Rio Grande do Norte, Brazil	
Win	13–7	John Kolosci	Submission (reverse triangle choke)	XFC 15: Tribute	December 2, 2011	1	4:46	Tampa, Florida, United States	
Loss	12–7	Jonatas Novaes	Submission (armbar)	Combat USA	May 14, 2011	1	4:08	Racine, Wisconsin, United States	For the Combat USA Illinois State Championship.
Win	12–6	Daniel Head	Submission (triangle choke)	Colosseum Combat 16	February 19, 2011	1	2:04	Kokomo, Indiana, United States	Won CC Interim Welterweight Championship.
Loss	11–6	Jim Wallhead	Decision (unanimous)	Bellator 32	October 14, 2010	3	5.00	Kansas City, Missouri, United States	
Loss	11–5	Ben Askren	Decision (unanimous)	Bellator 19	May 20, 2010	3	5:00	Grand Prairie, Texas, United States	Bellator Season 2 Welterweight Tournament Semifinal.
Win	11–4	Jacob McClintock	TKO (punches)	Bellator 15	April 22, 2010	1	4:11	Uncasville, Connecticut, United States	Bellator Season 2 Welterweight Tournament Quarterfinal.
Loss	10–4	Ben Askren	Technical Submission (guillotine choke)	Bellator 14	April 15, 2010	1	2:40	Chicago, Illinois, United States	Bellator Season 2 Welterweight Tournament Quarterfinal.
Win	10–3	Ryan Stout	Submission (triangle choke)	War in the Yard	August 8, 2009	1	1:57	Anderson, Indiana, United States	
Loss	9–3	Matt Brown	Submission (armbar)	UFC 91	November 15, 2008	2	0:57	Las Vegas, Nevada, United States	
Loss	9–2	Ben Saunders	Submission (armbar)	UFC 87	August 9, 2008	2	2:28	Minneapolis, Minnesota, United States	UFC debut.
Win	9–1	John McElroy	Submission (triangle choke)	AFA: American Fighting Association	July 17, 2008	1	0:36	Des Moines, Iowa, United States	
Win	8–1	Jason Holmes	Submission (strikes)	Courage Fighting Championships 11	May 2, 2008	1	2:15	Champaign, Illinois, United States	Won CFC Welterweight Championship.
Win	7–1	Jason Bowling	TKO (punches)	Extreme Challenge 94	April 19, 2008	1	1:48	Danville, Illinois, United States	
Win	6–1	Kenny Allen	Submission (triangle choke)	Extreme Challenge 89	February 23, 2008	1	2:54	Decatur, Illinois, United States	
Loss	5–1	Jesse Lennox	Submission (armbar)	Mainstream MMA - Cold War	January 26, 2008	3	2:03	Cedar Rapids, Iowa, United States	
Win	5–0	Chris Bachmeier	TKO (Punches)	WFC - Downtown Throwdown	September 14, 2007	3	1:06	Minneapolis, Minnesota, United States	
Win	4–0	Walt Denim	KO (punch)	Courage Fighting Championships 9	June 20, 2007	1	0:45	Terre Haute, Indiana, United States	
Win	3–0	Tyler Anderson	Submission	MMA - Genesis 3	June 15, 2007	1	0:50	St. Charles, Missouri, United States	
Win	2–0	Kris Huffman	TKO (punches)	Courage Fighting Championships 8	April 21, 2007	1	1:16	Decatur, Illinois, United States	
Win	1–0	Ron Wilson	Submission (verbal)	Dragons Cage - Marion	April 14, 2007	1	1:56	Marion, Illinois, United States	
