= Steve Carl =

American mixed martial arts fighter

- Born: December 20, 1984 (age 41); Belle Plaine, Iowa, U.S.
- Nationality: American
- Height: 6 ft 0 in (1.83 m)
- Weight: 170 lb (77 kg; 12 st)
- Division: Welterweight
- Reach: 72 in (183 cm)
- Fighting out of: Cedar Rapids, Iowa, U.S.
- Team: American Top Team
- Years active: 2005-present

Mixed martial arts record
- Total: 28
- Wins: 22
- By knockout: 2
- By submission: 17
- By decision: 3
- Losses: 6
- By knockout: 2
- By submission: 2
- By decision: 2

Other information
- Mixed martial arts record from Sherdog

Steven Joseph "Steve" Carl (born December 20, 1984) is an American mixed martial artist. A professional MMA competitor since 2005, Carl previously competed for Bellator from 2010 to 2011 and last competed in the welterweight division for Absolute Championship Akhmat. He is the former WSOF Welterweight Champion.

== Background ==
Carl was a 2003 graduate of Belle Plaine High School in Belle Plaine, Iowa. While there, he enjoyed a successful wrestling career, where he qualified for the Iowa state tournament in 2001. He was also a South Iowa Cedar League and Sectional Champion in 2003. He graduated from Kirkwood Community College in 2009.

== Mixed martial arts career ==
=== Early career ===
While in the Army Carl started training at the Grapplers Lair, after two months of training and no amateur fights Carl made his professional debut on November 5, 2005, against Andrew Perkins, winning the fight via submission (strikes).

Carl went undefeated at 5-0 before taking his first loss to future UFC fighter, Brian Foster. Carl rattled off seven consecutive wins, six of which were finishes, before being signed by Bellator.

=== Bellator ===
Carl made his debut for the promotion on April 22, 2010, at Bellator 15 in the Bellator Season 2 Welterweight Tournament. He was matched against Brett Cooper and after three close rounds, Carl won the fight via split decision.

In the semi-final round Carl was matched against Sengoku veteran, Dan Hornbuckle, at Bellator 19. Carl lost the fight midway into the first round via submission, eliminating him from the tournament.

Carl took an off-tournament fight against Tyler Stinson at Bellator 26. Midway into the first round Carl applied a guillotine choke and choked Stinson unconscious. The impressive win earned him entry into the next season Welterweight Tournament. However, Carl injured his foot and was unable to compete in the tournament.

Carl entered into the Bellator Season Five Welterweight Tournament, and was matched against the tournament favorite Douglas Lima. The fight took place at Bellator 49. Carl lost the fight via unanimous decision. Carl was released from the promotion after the loss.

=== Post-Bellator ===
In December 2011 Carl made his post-Bellator debut fighting for Far Eastern Federation of Modern Pankration in Russia. He defeated Rustam Bogatirev via submission in the first round.

On March 2, 2012, Carl fought Mason Temiquel, taking the fight on only one day's notice, winning via submission and then on July 28, 2012, later defeated Vic Hall via submission, both in the first round. Carl defeated Andrew Trace via first round submission at Madtown Throwdown on August 11, 2012.

=== World Series of Fighting ===
In late 2012, Carl signed with upstart Las Vegas promotion World Series of Fighting. His debut came at the promotion's first event, World Series of Fighting 1, held on November 3, 2012, against Ramico Blackmon. Steve Carl won the fight via rear naked choke submission in the first round.

Steve Carl defeated Tyson Steele on June 14, 2013, at WSOF 3 via rear-naked choke submission in round one.

Steve Carl fought Josh Burkman and won via triangle choke submission in the fourth round at WSOF 6 to become the first WSOF Welterweight Championship.

Carl made his first title defense at WSOF 9 on March 29, 2014, against UFC vet Rousimar Palhares. He lost the bout due to submission in the first round.

=== The Ultimate Fighter: American Top Team vs. Blackzilians ===
Steve Carl was confirmed as a cast member for The Ultimate Fighter 21 representing American Top Team.

== Championships and accomplishments ==
- World Series of Fighting
  - WSOF Welterweight Championship (First, one time)

== Mixed martial arts record ==
Professional record breakdown
28 matches	22 wins	6 losses
By knockout	2	2
By submission	17	2
By decision	3	2

Res.	Record	Opponent	Method	Event	Date	Round	Time	Location	Notes
Loss	22–6	Beslan Isaev	Decision (unanimous)	ACB 49: Rostov Onslaught	November 26, 2016	3	5:00	Rostov-on-Don, Russia	
Loss	22–5	Belal Muhammad	TKO (punches)	Titan FC 38	April 30, 2016	4	4:07	Florida, United States	For the inaugural Titan FC Welterweight Championship.
Win	22–4	Beslan Ushukov	Submission (rear-naked choke)	Akhmat Fight Show 13: Battle in Grozny	December 26, 2015	3	3:17	Grozny, Russia	
Loss	21–4	Rousimar Palhares	Submission (inverted heel hook)	WSOF 9	March 29, 2014	1	1:09	Las Vegas, Nevada, United States	Lost the WSOF Welterweight Championship.
Win	21–3	Joshua Burkman	Technical Submission (triangle choke)	WSOF 6	October 26, 2013	4	1:02	Coral Gables, Florida, United States	Won the inaugural WSOF Welterweight Championship.
Win	20–3	Tyson Steele	Submission (rear-naked choke)	WSOF 3	June 14, 2013	1	1:32	Las Vegas, Nevada, United States	
Win	19–3	Ramico Blackmon	Submission (rear-naked choke)	WSOF 1	November 3, 2012	1	2:11	Las Vegas, Nevada, United States	
Win	18–3	Andrew Trace	Submission (rear-naked choke)	Madtown Throwdown 28	August 11, 2012	1	0:55	Madison, Wisconsin, United States	
Win	17–3	Vic Hall	Submission (rear-naked choke)	Extreme Challenge 216	July 28, 2012	1	1:25	Cedar Rapids, Iowa, United States	
Win	16–3	Mason Temiquel	Submission (kimura)	Midwest Cage Championship 39	March 2, 2012	1	3:01	Des Moines, Iowa, United States	
Win	15–3	Rustam Bogatirev	Submission (triangle choke)	FEFoMP: Battle of Empires	December 17, 2011	1	3:50	Khabarovsk Krai, Russia	
Loss	14–3	Douglas Lima	Decision (unanimous)	Bellator 49	September 10, 2011	3	5:00	Atlantic City, New Jersey, United States	Season Five Welterweight Tournament Quarterfinals.
Win	14–2	Tyler Stinson	Technical Submission (guillotine choke)	Bellator 26	August 26, 2010	1	2:30	Kansas City, Missouri, United States	
Loss	13–2	Dan Hornbuckle	Submission (kimura)	Bellator 19	May 20, 2010	1	2:31	Grand Prairie, Texas, United States	Season Two Welterweight Tournament Semifinals.
Win	13–1	Brett Cooper	Decision (split)	Bellator 15	April 22, 2010	3	5:00	Uncasville, Connecticut, United States	Season Two Welterweight Tournament Quarterfinals.
Win	12–1	Mo Spears	Submission (punches)	Warriors 4 Warriors 2	November 27, 2009	1	1:19	Iowa City, Iowa, United States	
Win	11–1	Victor Moreno	Submission (armbar)	MFDM: Maxfights 1	June 19, 2009	1	1:32	Des Moines, Iowa, United States	
Win	10–1	Ivan Ivanov	Submission (rear-naked choke)	M-1 Challenge: 2009 Selections 3	March 28, 2009	1	3:31	Bourgas, Bulgaria	
Win	9–1	Matt Delanoit	Submission (triangle choke)	Midwest Cage Championships 18	January 16, 2009	3	1:27	Des Moines, Iowa, United States	
Win	8–1	James Warfield	Decision (unanimous)	Warriors 4 Warriors 1	November 8, 2008	3	5:00	Cedar Rapids, Iowa, United States	
Win	7–1	Brian Green	TKO (punches)	Conquest Fighting Championship 1	September 27, 2008	1	3:34	Des Moines, Iowa, United States	
Win	6–1	Conan Cano	Submission (guillotine choke)	King of Kombat 4	July 26, 2008	1	0:59	Austin, Texas, United States	
Loss	5–1	Brian Foster	TKO (punches)	Masters of the Cage 7	December 2, 2006	1	4:34	Norman, Oklahoma, United States	
Win	5–0	Raheem Williams	Submission	Renegades Extreme Fighting	September 30, 2006	2	2:59	Houston, Texas, United States	
Win	4–0	James White	Submission	Ultimate Texas Showdown 5	April 29, 2006	1	2:25	Texas, United States	
Win	3–0	Brandon Berkey	TKO (punches)	Ultimate Texas Showdown 4	February 25, 2006	2	2:08	Texas, United States	
Win	2–0	Henry Buchanan	Decision (unanimous)	Renegades Extreme Fighting	February 10, 2006	3	5:00	Austin, Texas, United States	
Win	1–0	Andrew Perkins	Submission (punches)	Xtreme Fight Championship 4	November 5, 2005	1	N/A	Fort Smith, Arkansas, United States	

=== Mixed martial arts exhibition record ===
Exhibition record breakdown		
2 matches	0 wins	2 losses
By submission	0	1
By decision	0	1

Res.	Record	Opponent	Method	Event	Date	Round	Time	Location	Notes
Loss	0–2	Kamaru Usman	Decision (unanimous)	The Ultimate Fighter 21	June 17, 2015 (airdate)	2	5:00	Coconut Creek, Florida, United States	
Loss	0–1	Valdir Araújo	Submission (guillotine choke)	The Ultimate Fighter 21	May 6, 2015 (airdate)	2	4:13	Boca Raton, Florida, United States	
