= Super middleweight (MMA) =

MMA weight class

The super middleweight (or light cruiserweight) division in MMA sits between the middleweight division and the light heavyweight division. It was approved by the Association of Boxing Commissions on July 26, 2017. The upper limit was set at 195 lb (88.5 kg).
