= Titan FC 29 =

Mixed martial arts event

Titan FC 29: Ricci vs. Sotiropoulos
- Promotion: Titan Fighting Championship
- Date: August 22, 2014
- Venue: Crown Coliseum
- City: Fayetteville, North Carolina

Event chronology
Titan FC 28: Brilz vs. Davis	Titan FC 29: Ricci vs. Sotiropoulos	Titan FC 30: Brilz vs. Magalhaes

Titan FC 29: Ricci vs. Sotiropoulos was a mixed martial arts event, held on August 22, 2014, at the Crown Coliseum in Fayetteville, North Carolina.

== Background ==
Originally this event was supposed to headline by former UFC vets Ben Saunders taking on Matt Riddle for the vacant wetherlegith championship but Riddle pulled out due to injury and was replaced with Jose Landi-Jons. The fight was then called off due to Landi-Jons running into visa issues and Ben Saunders returning to the UFC.

Originally Mike Ricci & George Sotiropoulos were slated to take on one another at Titan FC 28, but Ricci suffered an injury and the bout was called off.

Vinny Magalhães was scheduled to fight Dustin Jacoby but Magalhães suffered a minor injury and was replaced with Lucas Lopes.

== Official fight card ==
Main Card
Weight class				Method	Round	Time	Notes
Lightweight	Mike Ricci	def.	George Sotiropoulos	Decision (unanimous)	3	5:00
Featherweight	Kurt Holobaugh	def.	Lloyd Woodard	TKO (punches)	1	0:15
Welterweight	Bristol Marunde	def.	Micah Miller	Decision (unanimous)	3	5:00
Welterweight	Keith Johnson	def.	Mike Bronzoulis	Submission (rear-naked choke)	3	3:31
Featherweight	Brian Davidson	def.	Kevin Smith	Decision (unanimous)	3	5:00
Light Heavyweight	Dustin Jacoby	def.	Lucas Lopes	TKO (head kick and punches)	1	4:15
Welterweight	Robert Washington	def.	Blaine Thomas	TKO (doctor stoppage)	1	1:20
Middleweight	Steve Montgomery	vs.	Rakim Cleveland	Decision (split)	3	5:00
Lightweight	Luciano dos Santos	def.	Jeremy Severn	TKO (knees and punches)	3	2:38
Lightweight	D'Juan Owens	def.	Mike Bruno	Decision (split)	3	5:00
Lightweight	Ururahy Rodrigues	def.	Lamar Reed	Decision (split)	3	5:00

== See also ==
- Titan Fighting Championships
- List of Titan FC events
- Titan FC events
