= Titan FC 30 =

Mixed martial arts event

Titan FC 30: Brilz vs. Magalhaes
- Promotion: Titan Fighting Championship
- Date: September 26, 2014
- Venue: Cedar Park Center
- City: Cedar Park, Texas

Event chronology
Titan FC 29: Ricci vs. Sotiropoulos	Titan FC 30: Brilz vs. Magalhaes	Titan FC 31: Torres vs. Green

Titan FC 30: Brilz vs. Magalhaes was a mixed martial arts event, held on September 26, 2014, at the Cedar Park Center in Cedar Park, Texas.

== Background ==
This event is headlined by former UFC vets Vinny Magalhães & Jason Brilz battling for the vacant Titan FC Light Heavyweight Championship. Originally this fight was scheduled to happen at Titan FC 28 but Magalhães was forced out of the fight due to a Staph Infection.

Former UFC heavyweights Walt Harris & Dave Herman were originally scheduled to take place at this event but was cancelled due to Harris injuring his back.

== Official fight card ==
Main Card
Weight class				Method	Round	Time	Notes
Light Heavyweight	Vinny Magalhães	def.	Jason Brilz	Submission (guillotine choke)	4	0:36	(Note: For vacant Titan FC Light Heavyweight Championship.)
Bantamweight	Walel Watson	def.	Anthony Gutierrez	Submission (triangle choke)	1	3:02
Catchweight	Gleristone Santos	def.	Robert Washington	Decision (split)	3	5:00	(Note: Catchweight bout(150 lbs.))
Welterweight	Le'Ville Simpson	def.	Richie Martinez	TKO (punches)	1	2:56
Catchweight	Pedro Nobre	def.	Nick Honstein	Decision (split)	3	5:00	(Note: Catchweight bout(130 lbs.))
Catchweight	E. J. Brooks	def.	Todd Moore	Decision (unanimous)	3	5:00	(Note: Catchweight bout(165 lbs.))
Flyweight	Cody Williams	def.	Xavier Siller	TKO (punches)	1	3:54
Lightweight	Adam Nijem	def.	Gabe Carillo	TKO (punches)	2	0:33
Featherweight	Matt Mazurek	def.	Chuck Adkison	TKO (punches)	2	0:09
Bantamweight	Kevin Troyer	def.	Eric Hendon	Submission (triangle choke)	1	3:49
Featherweight	Julian Shore	def.	Phillip Platt	Submission (armbar)	1	1:38

== See also ==
- Titan Fighting Championships
- List of Titan FC events
- Titan FC events
