= Jason Brilz =

American mixed martial arts fighter

- Born: July 7, 1975 (age 51); Bismarck, North Dakota, U.S.
- Other names: The Hitman
- Height: 5 ft 11 in (1.80 m)
- Weight: 223 lb (101 kg; 15.9 st)
- Division: Heavyweight; Light Heavyweight; Middleweight
- Reach: 71.5 in (182 cm)
- Fighting out of: Omaha, Nebraska, U.S.
- Team: Elite Performance/Midamerica Martial Arts
- Wrestling: NCAA Division II Wrestling
- Years active: 2000–2015

Mixed martial arts record
- Total: 30
- Wins: 23
- By knockout: 8
- By submission: 8
- By decision: 7
- Losses: 6
- By knockout: 2
- By submission: 2
- By decision: 2
- Draws: 1

Other information
- Occupation: Firefighter
- University: University of Nebraska at Omaha
- Spouse: Rebecca
- Children: 2
- Notable school: Omaha Central High School
- Mixed martial arts record from Sherdog
- Last updated on: May 05, 2010

Jason Brilz (born July 7, 1975) is a retired American mixed martial artist who most recently fought in the Heavyweight division. A professional competitor since 2000, he has competed for the UFC, Titan FC, and King of the Cage.

== Wrestling career ==
Brilz won the Nebraska Class A wrestling state championship in 1993 for Omaha Central High School. Along with his state title, Brilz was an Academic All-American in 1993. Brilz wrestled collegiately at the University of Nebraska-Omaha, where he was a three time Academic All-American, a four-year letter winner, and compiled a 63–34 career record.

== Mixed martial arts career ==
Brilz made his MMA debut in 2000. He went on to achieve an 11-win streak and has entered into various talks with the UFC throughout the years with the aim of joining the organization. Brilz finally secured his debut deal to fight in his native Omaha, Nebraska, at the UFC Fight Night 15 event.

=== Ultimate Fighting Championship ===
Brilz defeated Brad Morris in his UFC debut via TKO (punches) midway through the second round.

Brilz then returned six months later to fight Tim Boetsch and won via unanimous decision at UFC 96.

Brilz' first loss in the UFC (and second in his career) came at the hands of The Ultimate Fighter 8 veteran Eliot Marshall, as Brilz lost via split decision, which was regarded as a controversial decision.

Brilz bounced back against Eric Schafer at UFC Live: Vera vs. Jones, defeating him via unanimous decision.

At UFC 114, Antônio Rogério Nogueira was scheduled to fight Forrest Griffin. However, Griffin had to pull out of the bout due to a shoulder injury, which left his slot open. With less than a month before the fight, Brilz stepped in to fight Nogueira. In a controversial split decision in which Brilz seemed to control the duration of the fight, Nogueira was declared the winner. The bout won Fight of the Night honors.

Brilz was expected to face former IFL Light Heavyweight Champion Vladimir Matyushenko on November 13, 2010, at UFC 122. However, Brilz was forced out of the bout with an injury and replaced by Alexandre Ferreira.

Brilz was expected to face undefeated Phil Davis on April 30, 2011, at UFC 129, but Davis pulled from that bout and fought Brilz' UFC 114 opponent Antônio Rogério Nogueira at UFC Fight Night 24, replacing an injured Tito Ortiz. Brilz instead faced Vladimir Matyushenko at the event and lost via KO 20 seconds into the first round.

Brilz faced Ryan Bader on November 19, 2011 at UFC 139. In the opening round, Bader caught Brilz with a straight right above the ear that knocked him out. Subsequently, Brilz was released from the promotion.

=== Titan Fighting Championships ===
On November 16, 2012, Brilz then won against Will Dicke by KO 19 seconds into the second round. Brilz was expected to face Vinny Magalhaes at Titan FC 28 on April 25, 2014, however, Magalhaes was forced out of the bout due to injury, and was replaced by Raphael Davis. Brilz won the fight via split decision.

The fight with Magalhaes was re-booked and set to take place on September 26, 2014 at Titan FC 30, for the vacant Titan FC Light Heavyweight Championship. Brilz lost via guillotine choke submission in the fourth round.

== Personal life ==
Brilz was an assistant coach at back to back Division II National Wrestling champs, the University of Nebraska-Omaha prior to cancellation of the University's wrestling program. Along with wrestling at UNO, Brilz also trains at Omaha's new Premier Combat Center with fellow UFC fighters Ryan Jensen and Jake Ellenberger.

Despite this relative success in his career, he has stated he is not interested in pursuing fighting full-time. Brilz and his wife Rebecca have two daughters, Evelyn and Gabbi.

== Mixed martial arts record ==
Professional record breakdown
30 matches	23 wins	6 losses
By knockout	8	2
By submission	8	2
By decision	7	2
Draws	1	

Res.	Record	Opponent	Method	Event	Date	Round	Time	Location	Notes
Win	23–6–1	Scott Hough	Submission (kimura)	DCS 16: Spring Brawl 2	April 24, 2015	2	3:15	Lincoln, Nebraska, United States	Heavyweight bout.
Loss	22–6–1	Vinny Magalhães	Submission (guillotine choke)	Titan FC 30	September 26, 2014	4	0:36	Cedar Park, Texas, United States	For the inaugural Titan FC Light Heavyweight Championship.
Win	22–5–1	Raphael Davis	Decision (split)	Titan FC 28	May 16, 2014	3	5:00	Newkirk, Oklahoma, United States	
Win	21–5–1	Dallas Mitchell	Decision (unanimous)	Victory Fighting Championship 41	December 14, 2013	3	5:00	Ralston, Nebraska, United States	
Win	20–5–1	Josh Bryant	Decision (majority)	Victory Fighting Championship 39	March 30, 2013	3	5:00	Ralston, Nebraska, United States	
Win	19–5–1	Will Dicke	KO (punch)	Disorderly Conduct 13: Legacy	November 16, 2012	2	0:19	Omaha, Nebraska, United States	
Loss	18–5–1	Ryan Bader	KO (punch)	UFC 139	November 19, 2011	1	1:17	San Jose, California, United States	
Loss	18–4–1	Vladimir Matyushenko	KO (punches)	UFC 129	April 30, 2011	1	0:20	Toronto, Ontario, Canada	
Loss	18–3–1	Antônio Rogério Nogueira	Decision (split)	UFC 114	May 29, 2010	3	5:00	Las Vegas, Nevada, United States	Fight of the Night.
Win	18–2–1	Eric Schafer	Decision (unanimous)	UFC LIVE: Vera vs. Jones	March 21, 2010	3	5:00	Broomfield, Colorado, United States	
Loss	17–2–1	Eliot Marshall	Decision (split)	UFC 103	September 19, 2009	3	5:00	Dallas, Texas, United States	
Win	17–1–1	Tim Boetsch	Decision (unanimous)	UFC 96	March 7, 2009	3	5:00	Columbus, Ohio, United States	
Win	16–1–1	Brad Morris	TKO (punches)	UFC Fight Night: Diaz vs. Neer	September 17, 2008	2	2:54	Omaha, Nebraska, United States	
Win	15–1–1	Erik Jenks	Submission (rear-naked choke)	Beatdown: 4 Bears Casino	May 10, 2008	1	4:46	New Town, North Dakota, United States	
Win	14–1–1	Aaron Praschak	Submission (rear-naked choke)	DFC 7: Revolution	October 7, 2007	1	4:55	Bismarck, North Dakota, United States	
Win	13–1–1	Rob Wince	TKO (submission to punches)	ACF: Exodus	May 6, 2006	1	2:37	Council Bluffs, Iowa, United States	
Win	12–1–1	Alex Schoenauer	Submission (guillotine choke)	VFC 11: Demolition	September 3, 2005	2	4:06	Council Bluffs, Iowa, United States	Return to Light Heavyweight.
Win	11–1–1	Jason MacDonald	Decision (split)	KOTC: Edmonton	April 16, 2005	2	5:00	Edmonton, Alberta, Canada	Middleweight debut.
Win	10–1–1	Jerry Spiegel	KO	VFC: Madness	March 5, 2005	2	4:30	Council Bluffs, Iowa, United States	
Win	9–1–1	Kyle Olsen	TKO (punches)	XKK: Des Moines	October 30, 2004	2	2:00	Des Moines, Iowa, United States	
Win	8–1–1	Mike Patt	TKO (corner stoppage)	VFC 6: Overload	November 22, 2003	2	5:00	Council Bluffs, Iowa, United States	Light Heavyweight bout.
Draw	7–1–1	Justin Eilers	Draw	VFC 4: Wildcard	April 19, 2003	3	5:00	Council Bluffs, Iowa, United States	
Win	7–1	Tony Mendoza	Submission (rear-naked choke)	ROF 7: Meltdown	March 28, 2003	1	2:46	Denver, Colorado, United States	
Win	6–1	Nate Schroeder	Decision	Victory Fighting Championships 1	June 16, 2002	1	15:00	Council Bluffs, Iowa, United States	Heavyweight debut.
Loss	5–1	Vince Fields	Submission (armbar)	UW: Caged Fights	September 9, 2001	1	1:45	St. Paul, Minnesota, United States	
Win	5–0	Dennis Reed	Submission (armbar)	Iowa Challenge 2	August 11, 2001	1	1:34	Cedar Rapids, Iowa, United States	
Win	4–0	Brad Krane	TKO (submission to punches)	Gladiators 14	May 11, 2001	1	N/A	Omaha, Nebraska, United States	
Win	3–0	John Herrera	Submission (guillotine choke)	MSF: Night of Thunder	April 19, 2001	3	N/A	Fort Collins, Colorado, United States	
Win	2–0	Gary Hicks	TKO (punches)	Extreme Challenge 38	November 16, 2000	1	2:29	Council Bluffs, Iowa, United States	
Win	1–0	Mitch Rosland	Submission (kimura)	Gladiators 4	March 2, 2000	3	N/A	N/A	
