= Titan FC 28 =

Mixed martial arts event

Titan FC 28: Brilz vs. Davis
- Promotion: Titan Fighting Championship
- Date: May 16, 2014
- Venue: First Council Casino Hotel
- City: Newkirk, Oklahoma

Event chronology
Titan FC 27: Ricci vs. Gurgel	Titan FC 28: Brilz vs. Davis	Titan FC 29: Ricci vs. Sotiropoulos

Titan FC 28: Brilz vs. Davis was a mixed martial arts event, held on May 16, 2014 at the First Council Casino Hotel in Newkirk, Oklahoma.

== Background ==
Originally Mike Ricci was slated to take on George Sotiropoulos, but Ricci suffered an injury and the bout was called off and rescheduled for June 6th.

The event was originally scheduled to be headlined by a light heavyweight bout between former UFC vets Vinny Magalhaes and Jason Brilz, However Magalhaes pulled out of the fight and was replaced with Bellator vet Raphael Davis.

Former UFC vet Daniel Roberts took on Brock Jardine in lightweight fight as the co main event.

Former King of the Cage Junior Welterweight Champion & TUF contestant Ricky Legere faced Todd Moore in a welterweight clash.

Dave Herman was originally scheduled to fight former Bellator & WSOF vet D.J. Linderman, however Linderman pulled out of the bout and was replaced by Kalib Starnes.

== Official fight card ==
Main Card
Weight class				Method	Round	Time	Notes
Light Heavyweight	Jason Brilz	def.	Raphael Davis	Decision (split)	3	5:00
Lightweight	Daniel Roberts	def.	Brock Jardine	Decision (split)	3	5:00
Welterweight	Brian Foster	def.	Gilbert Smith	Decision (unanimous)	3	5:00
Featherweight	Gleristone Santos	def.	Alvin Robinson	TKO (punches)	2	4:51
Heavyweight	Walt Harris	def.	D.J. Linderman	KO (punches)	1	4:12
Heavyweight	Dave Herman	def.	Kalib Starnes	Decision (unanimous)	3	5:00
Bantamweight	Walel Watson	def.	William Joplin	Submission (rear naked choke)	3	2:29
Lightweight	David Nelson	vs.	Gastón Reyno	No Contest	-	-	(Note: Illegal Knee)
Flyweight	Pedro Nobre	def.	Dan O’Connor	Decision (unanimous)	3	5:00
Middleweight	Josh Bryant	def.	Matt Foster	Submission (rear naked choke)	1	3:13
Middleweight	Wayman Carter	def.	Wayne Cole	Submission (rear naked choke)	1	4:19

== See also ==
- Titan Fighting Championships
- List of Titan FC events
- Titan FC events
