= Austin Hubbard =

American mixed martial arts fighter

- Born: Austin Steven Phillip Hubbard; December 22, 1991 (age 34); Sterling, Illinois, U.S.
- Nickname: Thud
- Height: 5 ft 10 in (1.78 m)
- Weight: 155 lb (70 kg; 11 st 1 lb)
- Division: Lightweight
- Reach: 71 in (180 cm)
- Fighting out of: Denver, Colorado, U.S.
- Team: Combat Zone MMA; Miletich Fighting Systems (2013–2016); Elevation Fight Team (2016–present)
- Rank: Purple belt in Brazilian jiu-jitsu under Cody Donovan
- Years active: 2015–present

Mixed martial arts record
- Total: 27
- Wins: 16
- By knockout: 5
- By submission: 2
- By decision: 9
- Losses: 11
- By submission: 4
- By decision: 7

Other information
- Mixed martial arts record from Sherdog

Austin Steven Phillip Hubbard (born December 22, 1991) is an American mixed martial artist who competed in the Lightweight division of the Ultimate Fighting Championship (UFC). Fighting professionally since 2015, he has also competed for the Legacy Fighting Alliance, where he is the former Lightweight Champion.

== Background ==
A native of Sterling, Illinois, Hubbard began his athletic career playing football and practicing wrestling for Newman Central Catholic High School. While pursuing a degree in Criminal Justice at Sauk Valley Community College, he started training MMA as a way to stay in shape. Hubbard moved to Denver, Colorado and joined Elevation Fight Team, training with Drew Dober and Neil Magny.

== Mixed martial arts career ==
Hubbard started his professional MMA career in 2015. He was the former Legacy Fighting Alliance Lightweight Champion, amassing a record of 10–2 prior to signing with the UFC in April 2019.

Hubbard made his UFC debut on May 18, 2019, at UFC Fight Night 152 against Davi Ramos. He lost the fight via unanimous decision. His second UFC bout was on September 14, 2019, against Kyle Prepolec at UFC Fight Night 158. Although he won this fight via unanimous decision, compartment syndrome on his upper thigh required surgery to relieve the swelling.

Six months later, Hubbard faced Mark Madsen on March 7, 2020, at UFC 248. He lost the fight by unanimous decision. Hubbard was expected to face Joe Solecki on June 20, 2020, at UFC on ESPN: Blaydes vs. Volkov. However at the last minute, Solecki was replaced by promotional newcomer Max Rohskopf. He won the fight via TKO between the second and third rounds after Rohskopf opted not to continue. The match with Solecki was rescheduled on August 22, 2020, at UFC on ESPN 15. He lost the fight by submission in the first round.

The following year, Hubbard was expected to face promotional newcomer Natan Levy on April 17, 2021, at UFC on ESPN 22; however, Levy pulled out of the bout, citing an injury. With Dakota Bush tapped to replace Levy, Hubbard won the fight via unanimous decision. Later that fall, Hubbard faced Vinc Pichel on August 21, 2021, at UFC on ESPN 29, losing via unanimous decision.

In May 2022, Hubbard was released from the UFC. Following his release, Hubbard faced Julian Lane at XMMA 5 on July 23, 2022, winning via unanimous decision. Three months later, Hubbard faced Kegan Agnew at Caged Aggression 34 on October 14, 2022, for the promotion's lightweight championship. He won the bout via unanimous decision.

=== The Ultimate Fighter 31 ===
In March 2023, it was announced that Hubbard would be competing in The Ultimate Fighter 31. In the quarterfinal (Episode 3), Hubbard faced former LFA Lightweight Champion Aaron McKenzie, winning via unanimous decision. In the semi-final round (Episode 9), Hubbard faced teammate Roosevelt Roberts. Although Hubbard won the fight via split decision, the bout was noted as unimpressive by UFC President Dana White for lack of aggressiveness.

In the tournament final, Hubbard faced teammate Kurt Holobaugh on August 19, 2023, at UFC 292. He lost the fight via a triangle choke submission in the second round.

=== Return to the UFC ===
In February 2024, it was announced that Hubbard would face Michał Figlak on April 27, 2024, at UFC on ESPN 55. Hubbard won the fight by unanimous decision. Later that year, Hubbard was briefly scheduled to face Nate Landwehr on October 5, 2024, at UFC 307; however, Landwehr withdrew for unknown reasons and was replaced by Alexander Hernandez on short notice. Hubbard lost the fight by split decision.

Hubbard was scheduled to face Daniel Zellhuber on March 29, 2025, at UFC on ESPN 64, replacing Elves Brener who withdrew for unknown reasons. However, Zellhuber was pulled from the card due to injury and was replaced by MarQuel Mederos. Hubbard lost to Mederos by split decision.

Hubbard faced Rong Zhu on August 23, 2025, at UFC Fight Night 257. He lost the fight via unanimous decision.

On September 11, 2025, it was reported that Hubbard was released by the UFC once again.

== Championships and achievements ==
- Ultimate Fighting Championship
  - The Ultimate Fighter 31 (Runner-up)
- Legacy Fighting Alliance
  - LFA Lightweight Championship (One time)

== Mixed martial arts record ==
Professional record breakdown
27 matches	16 wins	11 losses
By knockout	5	0
By submission	2	4
By decision	9	7

Res.	Record	Opponent	Method	Event	Date	Round	Time	Location	Notes
Loss	16–11	Kegan Gennrich	Technical Submission (arm-triangle choke)	Caged Aggression 41: Night 2	March 28, 2026	4	1:49	Davenport, Iowa, United States	Super Lightweight debut. For the vacant CAMMA Super Lightweight Championship.
Loss	16–10	Rong Zhu	Decision (unanimous)	UFC Fight Night: Walker vs. Zhang	August 23, 2025	3	5:00	Shanghai, China	
Loss	16–9	MarQuel Mederos	Decision (split)	UFC on ESPN: Moreno vs. Erceg	March 29, 2025	3	5:00	Mexico City, Mexico	
Loss	16–8	Alexander Hernandez	Decision (split)	UFC 307	October 5, 2024	3	5:00	Salt Lake City, Utah, United States	
Win	16–7	Michał Figlak	Decision (unanimous)	UFC on ESPN: Nicolau vs. Perez	April 27, 2024	3	5:00	Las Vegas, Nevada, United States	
Loss	15–7	Kurt Holobaugh	Submission (triangle choke)	UFC 292	August 19, 2023	2	2:39	Boston, Massachusetts, United States	The Ultimate Fighter 31 Lightweight Tournament Final.
Win	15–6	Kegan Agnew	Decision (unanimous)	Caged Aggression 34	October 14, 2022	5	5:00	Davenport, Iowa, United States	Won the CAMMA Lightweight Championship.
Win	14–6	Julian Lane	Decision (unanimous)	XMMA 5	July 23, 2022	3	5:00	Columbia, South Carolina, United States	Catchweight (165 lb) bout.
Loss	13–6	Vinc Pichel	Decision (unanimous)	UFC on ESPN: Cannonier vs. Gastelum	August 21, 2021	3	5:00	Las Vegas, Nevada, United States	
Win	13–5	Dakota Bush	Decision (unanimous)	UFC on ESPN: Whittaker vs. Gastelum	April 17, 2021	3	5:00	Las Vegas, Nevada, United States	
Loss	12–5	Joe Solecki	Submission (rear-naked choke)	UFC on ESPN: Munhoz vs. Edgar	August 22, 2020	1	3:51	Las Vegas, Nevada, United States	
Win	12–4	Max Rohskopf	TKO (retirement)	UFC on ESPN: Blaydes vs. Volkov	June 20, 2020	2	5:00	Las Vegas, Nevada, United States	
Loss	11–4	Mark Madsen	Decision (unanimous)	UFC 248	March 7, 2020	3	5:00	Las Vegas, Nevada, United States	
Win	11–3	Kyle Prepolec	Decision (unanimous)	UFC Fight Night: Cerrone vs. Gaethje	September 14, 2019	3	5:00	Vancouver, British Columbia, Canada	
Loss	10–3	Davi Ramos	Decision (unanimous)	UFC Fight Night: dos Anjos vs. Lee	May 18, 2019	3	5:00	Rochester, New York, United States	
Win	10–2	Killys Mota	TKO (punches)	LFA 56	December 7, 2018	5	4:45	Prior Lake, Minnesota, United States	Won the vacant LFA Lightweight Championship.
Win	9–2	Harvey Park	Decision (unanimous)	LFA 39	May 4, 2018	3	5:00	Vail, Colorado, United States	
Win	8–2	Charlie Radtke	Decision (unanimous)	Caged Aggression 22	March 10, 2018	3	5:00	Davenport, Iowa, United States	Catchweight (160 lb) bout.
Loss	7–2	Eric Wisely	Decision (unanimous)	Caged Aggression 20	October 7, 2017	3	5:00	Davenport, Iowa, United States	For the CAMMA Lightweight Championship.
Win	7–1	Cameron VanCamp	Submission (rear-naked choke)	Hoosier Fight Club 34	September 9, 2017	3	2:44	Hammond, Indiana, United States	Won the Hoosier FC Lightweight Championship.
Win	6–1	Kristian Nieto	Decision (unanimous)	Sparta Combat League 59	June 17, 2017	5	5:00	Denver, Colorado, United States	Return to Lightweight. Won the SCL Lightweight Championship.
Win	5–1	Cliff Wright	Decision (unanimous)	Caged Aggression 18	October 8, 2016	5	5:00	Davenport, Iowa, United States	Defended the CAMMA Welterweight Championship.
Loss	4–1	Sean McMurray	Submission (rear-naked choke)	Hoosier Fight Club 30	September 10, 2016	2	2:10	Michigan City, Indiana, United States	
Win	4–0	Devoniere Jackson	TKO (punches)	Caged Aggression 17	April 2, 2016	2	3:47	Davenport, Iowa, United States	Return to Welterweight. Won the CAMMA Welterweight Championship.
Win	3–0	Demian Papagni	TKO (submission to punches)	Pinnacle Combat 22	January 23, 2016	2	0:40	Dubuque, Iowa, United States	Catchweight (160 lb) bout.
Win	2–0	Jake Constant	TKO (punches)	Caged Aggression 16	December 5, 2015	1	1:36	Davenport, Iowa, United States	Lightweight debut.
Win	1–0	Deven Fisher	Submission (guillotine choke)	Caged Aggression: Sturgis 75th Anniversary Part 2	August 5, 2015	1	2:00	Sturgis, South Dakota, United States	Welterweight debut.

== Mixed martial arts exhibition record ==
Exhibition record breakdown		
2 matches	2 wins	0 losses
By decision	2	0

Res.	Record	Opponent	Method	Event	Date	Round	Time	Location	Notes
Win	2–0	Roosevelt Roberts	Decision (split)	The Ultimate Fighter: Team McGregor vs. Team Chandler	Jul 25, 2023 (airdate)	3	5:00	Las Vegas, Nevada, United States	The Ultimate Fighter 31 Semi-final round.
Win	1–0	Aaron McKenzie	Decision (unanimous)	The Ultimate Fighter: Team McGregor vs. Team Chandler	Jun 13, 2023 (airdate)	2	5:00	Las Vegas, Nevada, United States	The Ultimate Fighter 31 Quarterfinal round.

== See also ==
- List of male mixed martial artists
