= Raphael Davis =

American mixed martial arts fighter

- Born: September 1, 1976 (age 50); United States
- Other names: Noodle
- Nationality: American
- Height: 6 ft 3 in (1.91 m)
- Weight: 203 lb (92 kg; 14.5 st)
- Division: Light Heavyweight (205 lb)
- Fighting out of: Torrance, California, United States
- Team: Reign MMA
- Years active: 2006-2014

Mixed martial arts record
- Total: 16
- Wins: 13
- By knockout: 5
- By submission: 7
- By decision: 1
- Losses: 3
- By knockout: 1
- By decision: 2

Other information
- Occupation: Attorney
- Mixed martial arts record from Sherdog

Raphael Davis (born September 1, 1976) is an American mixed martial artist who has fought for Bellator FC and M-1 Global.

== MMA career ==
=== Early career and M-1 Challenge ===
Davis started his career in 2006, fighting mainly for Californian organizations. With a record of four wins and one loss, he signed with M-1 Challenge, a competition organized by M-1 Global.

He fought twice for M-1, defeating Jair Gonçalves and Jae Young Kim.

In 2010, with a record of 8-1 and victories over fighters like the TUF 8 finalist Vinny Magalhães and the MFC former light heavyweight champion Emanuel Newton, he signed with Bellator.

=== Bellator Fighting Championships ===
Davis made his debut on June 17, 2010, at Bellator 22 against Demetrius Richards. He won via submission in the very first round.

Davis faced the former KOTC champion Tony Lopez on October 28, 2010, at Bellator 34. He won via unanimous decision (30-27, 30–27, 30–27).

Davis faced D.J. Linderman on March 26, 2011, at Bellator 38 in the quarterfinal match of the season four light heavyweight tournament. After taking a significant amount of damage, Davis fallen via TKO in the third round.

Davis faced Myron Dennis on October 8, 2011, at Bellator 53. He won via KO in the second round.

=== World Series of Fighting ===
In October 2013, it was announced that Davis signed a multi-fight deal with World Series of Fighting.

== Arrest ==
In April 2012, Davis was arrested at his home in Lomita, California by the Los Angeles County District Attorney's investigators for suspicion of fraudulent claims of workers' compensation from December 2008 to May 2011, while competing in seven professional mixed martial arts matches during this time. He was held on $30,000 bail and was released the following day.

In September 2012, Davis pleaded guilty before the superior court to one felony count of filing a false workers’ compensation claim. The other three counts were dropped as a result of the plea and Davis had to complete 200 hours of community service. He was sentenced to three years of probation in March 2013.

== Mixed martial arts record ==
Professional record breakdown
16 matches	13 wins	3 losses
By knockout	5	1
By submission	7	0
By decision	1	2

Res.	Record	Opponent	Method	Event	Date	Round	Time	Location	Notes
Loss	13–3	Jason Brilz	Decision (split)	Titan FC 28: Brilz vs. Davis	May 16, 2014	3	5:00	Newkirk, Oklahoma, United States	
Win	13–2	Edward Darby	TKO (punches)	Xplode Fight Series: Creation	September 21, 2013	2	0:38	Valley Center, California, United States	
Win	12–2	Berin Balijagic	TKO (punches)	SHC 5: Llorent vs. Reljic	March 24, 2012	2	1:26	Geneva, Switzerland	
Win	11–2	Myron Dennis	KO (punch)	Bellator 53	October 8, 2011	2	0:29	Miami, Oklahoma, United States	
Loss	10–2	D.J. Linderman	TKO (punches)	Bellator 38	March 26, 2011	3	3:40	Tunica, Mississippi, United States	Bellator Season 4 Light Heavyweight Tournament Quarterfinal
Win	10–1	Tony Lopez	Decision (unanimous)	Bellator 34	October 28, 2010	3	5:00	Hollywood, Florida, United States	
Win	9–1	Demetrius Richards	Submission (armbar)	Bellator 22	June 17, 2010	1	2:51	Kansas City, Missouri, United States	
Win	8–1	Nikolai Onikienko	Submission (armbar)	FEFoMP: Mayor's Cup 2010	May 29, 2010	1	3:40	Khabarovsk, Russia	
Win	7–1	Emanuel Newton	Submission (rear-naked choke)	Called Out MMA 1	August 15, 2009	2	N/A	Ontario, California, United States	
Win	6–1	Jae Young Kim	TKO (submission to punches)	M-1 Challenge 14: Japan	April 29, 2009	2	3:45	Tokyo, Japan	
Win	5–1	Jair Goncalves	TKO (punches)	M-1 Challenge 12: USA	February 21, 2009	1	4:05	Tacoma, Washington, United States	
Win	4–1	Brandon Michaels	Submission	Total Fighting Alliance 13	November 15, 2008	1	0:22	Long Beach, California, United States	
Win	3–1	Vinny Magalhães	TKO (submission to punches)	Valor Fighting: Fight Night	March 7, 2008	2	3:03	Tustin, California, United States	
Win	2–1	Kawika Morton	Submission (choke)	CCFC: Total Elimination	May 12, 2007	1	N/A	Santa Rosa, California, United States	
Loss	1–1	Brent Beauparlant	Decision (unanimous)	IFL: Gracie vs. Miletich	September 23, 2006	3	4:00	Moline, Illinois, United States	
Win	1–0	Mike Martelle	TKO (strikes)	Cage of Fire 2	July 9, 2006	1	N/A	Tijuana, Baja California, Mexico	
