= Walel Watson =

American mixed martial arts fighter

- Born: July 16, 1984 (age 42); El Paso, Texas, United States
- Other names: The Gazelle; The Pharaoh
- Height: 5 ft 11 in (1.80 m)
- Weight: 135 lb (61 kg; 9.6 st)
- Division: Featherweight; Bantamweight
- Reach: 75.0 in (191 cm)
- Fighting out of: San Diego, California
- Team: Team Bodyshop MMA
- Years active: 2008-2019

Mixed martial arts record
- Total: 30
- Wins: 15
- By knockout: 3
- By submission: 12
- Losses: 15
- By knockout: 5
- By submission: 7
- By decision: 3

Other information
- Mixed martial arts record from Sherdog

Walel Watson (born July 16, 1984) is an American mixed martial artist and bare knuckle boxer. A professional since 2008, he has fought in the UFC, Titan FC, and Tachi Palace Fights.

== MMA career ==
Watson made his professional debut in 2008 for MMA Xtreme in Mexico at the age of 24. He lost his debut via submission, but went undefeated in his next 7 bouts and never going to the third round. Prior to joining the UFC, he amassed a record of 8 wins and 2 losses.

=== Ultimate Fighting Championship ===
In August 2011, it was announced that Watson signed with the UFC.

Watson's UFC debut took place against Joseph Sandoval on October 1, 2011, at UFC on Versus 6. He was successful in his debut, winning the fight early via TKO in the first round.

In his second fight, Watson faced Yves Jabouin on December 10, 2011, at UFC 140. After three close rounds Watson lost a controversial split decision.

Watson returned quickly to face T.J. Dillashaw on February 15, 2012, at UFC on Fuel TV 1. He lost the fight via unanimous decision.

Watson was defeated by Mitch Gagnon on September 22, 2012, at UFC 152 via first round rear naked choke.

After posting a 1–3 record inside the promotion, Watson was released from the UFC.

=== Post-UFC career ===
A short two months after his UFC release, Watson signed on to face Anthony Moore at Xplode Fight Series: Damage on November 17, 2012. He won the fight via first-round TKO. Watson then made a quick turnaround and faced Joey Apodaca at XFS: Vengeance on January 19, 2013. He won the fight via guillotine choke submission, just under twenty-seconds into the first round.

Watson faced Tom Niinimäki at Cage 23 on September 21, 2013. He lost the fight via kimura submission.

He then faced Rodrigo Almeida at CZ 46: Throwdown at The Rock on November 22, 2013. He lost the fight via unanimous decision. In his latest fight, Watson submitted William Joplin at Titan FC 28: Brilz vs. Davis on May 16, 2014.

Watson is expected to face Anthony Gutierrez at Titan FC 30 on September 26, 2014. Watson defeated Gutierrez by Submission in the first round.

On March 20, 2015, he faced Brett Johns for the inaugural Titan FC Bantamweight Championship at Titan FC 33. He lost the fight via submission in the second round.

Watson faced Ricardo Palacios at Golden Boy Promotions' inaugural MMA event on November 24, 2018. He lost the fight via TKO in the first round.

After a long layoff, Watson returned against Marvin Garcia on January 14, 2023 at LXF 8, winning the bout via first round guillotine. Less than two month later, Watson faced Serhiy Sidey for the BTC Bantamweight Championship at BTC 19 on March 18, 2023, losing the bout via TKO stoppage in the first round.

== Bare knuckle boxing ==
Watson made his bare knuckle debut on July 16, 2021 against Alberto Martinez Jr. Watson was defeated from a series of left hooks in the first round.

Watson returned on August 27, 2022 against Brandon Birr. He was defeated via second-round knockout.

== Championships and accomplishments ==
- Ultimate Fighting Championship
  - UFC.com Awards
    - 2011: Ranked #9 Newcomer of the Year

== Mixed martial arts record ==
Professional record breakdown
30 matches	15 wins	15 losses
By knockout	3	5
By submission	12	7
By decision	0	3
By disqualification	0	0
Unknown	0	0
Draws	0	
No contests	0	

Res.	Record	Opponent	Method	Event	Date	Round	Time	Location	Notes
Loss	15–15	Tariq Ismail	TKO (punches)	Durham Fight Series 1	June 3, 2023	2	1:44	Oshawa, Canada	
Loss	15–14	Serhiy Sidey	TKO (punches)	BTC 19	March 18, 2023	1	3:05	Kingston, Canada	Return to Bantamweight. For the vacant BTC Bantamweight Championship.
Win	15–13	Marvin Garcia	Submission (guillotine choke)	LXF 8: The Return	January 14, 2023	1	0:53	Commerce, California, United States	
Loss	14–13	Kyle Reyes	Submission (d'arce choke)	Final Fight Championship 35	April 19, 2019	1	2:00	Las Vegas, Nevada, United States	Return to Featherweight.
Loss	14–12	Ricardo Palacios	TKO (punch and head kick)	Golden Boy Promotions: Liddell vs. Ortiz 3	November 24, 2018	1	3:56	Inglewood, California, United States	Catchweight (140 lb) bout.
Loss	14–11	Fard Muhammad	Submission (rear-naked choke)	Smash Global 6	September 28, 2017	2	3:30	Los Angeles, California, United States	
Win	14–10	Miguelito Marti	Submission (choke)	Gladiator Challenge: Fight Fest	June 17, 2017	1	0:39	El Cajon, California, United States	
Loss	13–10	Felipe Efrain	KO (punch to the body)	Brave Combat Federation - Brave 3: Battle in Brazil	March 18, 2017	2	2:10	São José dos Pinhais, Paraná, Brazil	
Loss	13–9	Elias Boudegzdame	Submission (kimura)	Brave Combat Federation - Brave 2: Dynasty	December 2, 2016	1	1:47	Isa Town, Bahrain	Featherweight bout.
Loss	13–8	Brett Johns	Submission (rear-naked choke)	Titan FC 33	March 20, 2015	2	3:06	Mobile, Alabama, United States	For Titan FC Bantamweight Championship.
Win	13–7	Anthony Gutierrez	Submission (triangle choke)	Titan FC 30: Brilz vs. Magalhaes	September 26, 2014	1	3:02	Cedar Park, Texas, United States	
Win	12–7	William Joplin	Submission (rear-naked choke)	Titan FC 28: Brilz vs. Davis	May 16, 2014	3	2:29	Newkirk, Oklahoma, United States	Return to Bantamweight.
Loss	11–7	Rodrigo Almeida	Decision (unanimous)	CZ 46: Throwdown at The Rock	November 22, 2013	3	5:00	Salem, New Hampshire, United States	Catchweight (140 lb) bout.
Loss	11–6	Tom Niinimäki	Submission (kimura)	Cage 23	September 21, 2013	2	2:52	Vantaa, Finland	For the Cage Featherweight Championship.
Win	11–5	Joey Apodaca	Submission (guillotine choke)	Xplode Fight Series: Vengeance	January 19, 2013	1	0:17	Valley Center, California, United States	
Win	10–5	Anthony Moore	TKO (punches)	Xplode Fight Series: Damage	November 17, 2012	1	1:22	Valley Center, California, United States	
Loss	9–5	Mitch Gagnon	Submission (rear-naked choke)	UFC 152	September 22, 2012	1	1:09	Toronto, Ontario, Canada	
Loss	9–4	T.J. Dillashaw	Decision (unanimous)	UFC on Fuel TV: Sanchez vs. Ellenberger	February 15, 2012	3	5:00	Omaha, Nebraska, United States	
Loss	9–3	Yves Jabouin	Decision (split)	UFC 140	December 10, 2011	3	5:00	Toronto, Ontario, Canada	
Win	9–2	Joseph Sandoval	TKO (punches)	UFC Live: Cruz vs. Johnson	October 1, 2011	1	1:17	Washington, D.C., United States	
Win	8–2	Ismael Leon	Submission (anaconda choke)	Ultimate Warrior Challenge: To The Edge	June 25, 2011	1	4:58	Tijuana, Mexico	For the UWC Bantamweight Championship; won the UWC Bantamweight Championship.
Loss	7–2	Cody Gibson	TKO (punches & elbows)	TPF 9: The Contenders	May 6, 2011	2	4:09	Lemoore, California, United States	
Win	7–1	Cristian Jimenez	Submission (triangle choke)	Baja Cage Fighting 2: Bloody X-Mas	December 4, 2010	1	4:08	Tijuana, Mexico	
Win	6–1	Manuel Gallareta	Submission (guillotine choke)	Ultimate Warrior Challenge 8: Mexican Championships	October 16, 2010	1	0:43	Tijuana, Mexico	
Win	5–1	Joe Gustina	Submission (anaconda choke)	Baja Cage Fighting 1: Return of the Champ	July 17, 2010	1	3:04	Tijuana, Mexico	
Win	4–1	Cristian Jimenez	Submission (triangle armbar)	Ultimate Warrior Challenge 7: Evolution	June 26, 2010	2	2:26	Tijuana, Mexico	
Win	3–1	Gabriel Godinez	KO (punches)	Native Fighting Championship 4	March 27, 2010	1	2:15	Campo, California, United States	
Win	2–1	Kisack Monroy	Submission (guillotine choke)	Ultimate Warrior Challenge 4: Rebirth	November 28, 2009	2	1:33	Tijuana, Mexico	
Win	1–1	Peter Martinez	Submission (rear-naked choke)	Gladiator Challenge: Never Quit	November 8, 2009	2	1:33	San Jacinto, California, United States	
Loss	0–1	Enrique Cuellar	Submission (anaconda choke)	MMA Xtreme 22: Revolution	August 16, 2008	1	N/A	Mexico	
