= Kurt Holobaugh =

American mixed martial arts fighter

- Born: September 8, 1986 (age 40); Denham Springs, Louisiana, U.S.
- Other names: The Hurt
- Height: 5 ft 11 in (1.80 m)
- Weight: 155 lb (70 kg; 11.1 st)
- Division: Featherweight; Lightweight
- Reach: 75 1/2 in (192 cm)
- Stance: Orthodox
- Team: Gracie United
- Rank: Black belt in Brazilian jiu-jitsu under Rafael Ellwanger
- Years active: 2012–present

Mixed martial arts record
- Total: 33
- Wins: 23
- By knockout: 7
- By submission: 12
- By decision: 4
- Losses: 9
- By knockout: 1
- By submission: 1
- By decision: 7
- No contests: 1

Other information
- Mixed martial arts record from Sherdog

Kurt Holobaugh (born September 8, 1986) is an American professional mixed martial artist (MMA) who competed in the Lightweight division in the Ultimate Fighting Championship (UFC).

== Mixed martial arts ==
=== Early career ===
Holobaugh compiled an amateur record of 3–0 before making his professional MMA debut in March 2011. Over the next year-and-a-half, he amassed an undefeated record of 9 wins and no losses, with all but one of his wins coming by stoppage before the final bell.

=== Strikeforce and Ultimate Fighting Championship ===
In 2013, Holobaugh joined the Strikeforce organization. He made his debut against Pat Healy at Strikeforce: Marquardt vs. Saffiedine on January 12, 2013. He lost the fight via unanimous decision.

Following the Strikeforce event, the organization was folded and merged with the Ultimate Fighting Championship. Holobaugh's contract was honored and he made his UFC debut against Steven Siler at UFC 159 on April 27, 2013. He lost the fight by unanimous decision and was subsequently released by the promotion.

=== Post UFC career ===
After his UFC release, Holobaugh fought for various independent MMA promotions. He found the most success in Titan Fighting Championships, where he compiled a record of 5–1 within the promotion, and held both the Featherweight Championship and Interim Lightweight Championship.

=== Second UFC stint ===
Holobaugh would then be invited to compete in the main event of the inaugural edition of Dana White's Contender Series, facing Bellator veteran Matt Bessette. Holobaugh won the fight via knockout in round one, securing a UFC contract.

He faced Raoni Barcelos at UFC Fight Night: dos Santos vs. Ivanov and lost via knockout in the third round. Despite the loss, the win earned Holobaugh his first Fight of the Night bonus award.

Holobaugh next faced Shane Burgos at UFC 230 on November 3, 2018. He lost the fight via submission in the first round.

Holobaugh faced Thiago Moisés on May 11, 2019 UFC 237. He lost the fight by unanimous decision.

Holobaugh was released by the UFC in December 2019.

=== Post UFC ===
Holobaugh faced Joziro Boye at XFC 43 on November 11, 2020. He won the bout via first-round TKO.

As the semifinal of XFC Lightweight tournament Holobaugh was initially scheduled to face Scott Hudson at XFC 44 on May 28, 2021. However, Hudson withdrew and was replaced by Jose Luis Verdugo. He won the bout via KO at the beginning of the second round and advanced to the final.

=== The Ultimate Fighter 31 ===
In March 2023, it was announced that Holobaugh would be competing in the thirty-first season of The Ultimate Fighter.

In the quarterfinal Holobaugh faced team McGregor's number 1 ranked lightweight prospect Lee Hammond, who is also a training partner to McGregor at his gym in Ireland. After being behind for the majority of the fight, Holobaugh managed to win the fight via guillotine choke submission late in the second round.

In the semi-final, Holobaugh defeated teammate Jason Knight via TKO in the second round.

Holobaugh faced former LFA Lightweight Champion and teammate Austin Hubbard in the tournament final on August 19, 2023, at UFC 292. He won the fight via a triangle choke submission in the second round to become TUF 31 lightweight winner.

=== Return to UFC ===
Holobaugh faced Trey Ogden on March 23, 2024, at UFC on ESPN 53. He lost the bout by unanimous decision.

Holobaugh faced Kaynan Kruschewsky on July 20, 2024, at UFC on ESPN 60. He won the fight by unanimous decision.

Holobaugh faced Alexander Hernandez on March 15, 2025, at UFC Fight Night 254. He lost the fight by unanimous decision.

Holobaugh faced Jordan Leavitt on May 31, 2025, at UFC on ESPN 68. He lost the fight via an anaconda choke submission in the first round.

On November 10, 2025, Holobaugh was once again released from the UFC roster.

== Championships and accomplishments ==
=== Mixed martial arts ===
- Ultimate Fighting Championship
  - The Ultimate Fighter 31 Lightweight Tournament Winner
  - Fight of the Night (one time) vs. Raoni Barcelos
- Titan Fighting Championship
  - Titan FC Featherweight Championship (One time)
  - Interim Titan FC Lightweight Championship (One time)
- Xtreme Fighting Championships
  - XFC Louisiana Featherweight Championship (One time)

== Mixed martial arts record ==
Professional record breakdown
34 matches	23 wins	10 losses
By knockout	7	1
By submission	12	2
By decision	4	7
No contests	1	

Res.	Record	Opponent	Method	Event	Date	Round	Time	Location	Notes
Win	23–10 (1)	Jhonasky Sojo	Submission (armbar)	Gamebred Bareknuckle MMA 12	October 2, 2026	2	4:46	Santo Domingo, Dominican Republic	Gamebred FC Lightweight Grand Prix Quarterfinal.
Win	22–10 (1)	Lamar Brown	Submission (guillotine choke)	Gamebred Bareknuckle MMA 10	May 1, 2026	2	2:12	Miami, Florida, United States	Gamebred FC Lightweight Grand Prix Round of 16.
Loss	21–10 (1)	Jordan Leavitt	Technical Submission (anaconda choke)	UFC on ESPN: Gamrot vs. Klein	May 31, 2025	1	1:39	Las Vegas, Nevada, United States	
Loss	21–9 (1)	Alexander Hernandez	Decision (unanimous)	UFC Fight Night: Vettori vs. Dolidze 2	March 15, 2025	3	5:00	Las Vegas, Nevada, United States	
Win	21–8 (1)	Kaynan Kruschewsky	Decision (unanimous)	UFC on ESPN: Lemos vs. Jandiroba	July 20, 2024	3	5:00	Las Vegas, Nevada, United States	
Loss	20–8 (1)	Trey Ogden	Decision (unanimous)	UFC on ESPN: Ribas vs. Namajunas	March 23, 2024	3	5:00	Las Vegas, Nevada, United States	
Win	20–7 (1)	Austin Hubbard	Submission (triangle choke)	UFC 292	August 19, 2023	2	2:39	Boston, Massachusetts, United States	Won The Ultimate Fighter 31 Lightweight Tournament.
Win	19–7 (1)	Jose Luis Verdugo	KO (punch)	XFC 44	May 28, 2021	2	0:11	Des Moines, Iowa, United States	XFC Lightweight Tournament Semifinal.
Win	18–7 (1)	Joziro Boye	TKO (knees and punches)	XFC 43	November 11, 2020	1	0:26	Atlanta, Georgia, United States	
Loss	17–7 (1)	Thiago Moisés	Decision (unanimous)	UFC 237	May 11, 2019	3	5:00	Rio de Janeiro, Brazil	Return to Lightweight.
Loss	17–6 (1)	Shane Burgos	Submission (armbar)	UFC 230	November 3, 2018	1	2:11	New York City, New York, United States	
Loss	17–5 (1)	Raoni Barcelos	KO (punches)	UFC Fight Night: dos Santos vs. Ivanov	July 14, 2018	3	1:29	Boise, Idaho, United States	Fight of the Night.
NC	17–4 (1)	Matt Bessette	NC (overturned)	Dana White's Contender Series 1	July 11, 2017	1	2:59	Las Vegas, Nevada, United States	Return to Featherweight. Originally a KO (punch) win for Holobaugh; overturned due to his prohibited prefight use of an IV.
Win	17–4	Gesias Cavalcante	TKO (punches)	Titan FC 44	May 19, 2017	4	2:45	Pembroke Pines, Florida, United States	Won the interim Titan FC Lightweight Championship.
Win	16–4	Yosdenis Cedeno	Submission (rear-naked choke)	Titan FC 42	December 2, 2016	3	1:22	Coral Gables, Florida, United States	
Win	15–4	Luciano dos Santos	TKO (punches)	Titan FC 39	June 10, 2016	2	4:21	Coral Gables, Florida, United States	Return to Lightweight.
Loss	14–4	Magomedrasul Khasbulaev	Decision (unanimous)	WFCA 16	March 12, 2016	3	5:00	Grozny, Russia	2016 WFCA Featherweight Grand Prix Quarterfinal.
Loss	14–3	Andre Harrison	Decision (unanimous)	Titan FC 34	July 18, 2015	5	5:00	Kansas City, Missouri, United States	Lost the Titan FC Featherweight Championship.
Win	14–2	Desmond Green	Decision (split)	Titan FC 33	March 20, 2015	5	5:00	Mobile, Alabama, United States	Won the Titan FC Featherweight Championship.
Win	13–2	Lloyd Woodard	TKO (punches)	Titan FC 29	August 22, 2014	1	0:15	Fayetteville, North Carolina, United States	
Win	12–2	Eric Marriott	Decision (unanimous)	Titan FC 27	February 28, 2014	3	5:00	Kansas City, Kansas, United States	Lightweight bout.
Win	11–2	Calvin Miller	Submission (rear naked choke)	XFC: Louisiana	August 24, 2013	1	2:10	Ponchatoula, Louisiana, United States	Won the vacant XFC Featherweight Championship.
Win	10–2	John LeBlanc	Submission	In Ya Face: Caged Warrior 1	July 12, 2013	1	1:13	Houma, Louisiana, United States	Lightweight bout.
Loss	9–2	Steven Siler	Decision (unanimous)	UFC 159	April 27, 2013	3	5:00	Newark, New Jersey, United States	
Loss	9–1	Pat Healy	Decision (unanimous)	Strikeforce: Marquardt vs. Saffiedine	January 12, 2013	3	5:00	Oklahoma City, Oklahoma, United States	Lightweight bout.
Win	9–0	Wesley Dunlap	KO (punch)	Fight Force International: Blood and Sand 13	October 27, 2012	1	1:21	Biloxi, Mississippi, United States	
Win	8–0	Wellington Brito	TKO (punches)	XFC: Natural Disaster 3	August 25, 2012	1	3:31	Denham Springs, Louisiana, United States	Featherweight debut. Won the vacant XFC Featherweight Championship.
Win	7–0	Ronnie Rogers	Submission (rear naked choke)	Fight Force International: Blood and Sand 12	June 30, 2012	2	1:15	Biloxi, Mississippi, United States	Catchweight (160 lb) bout.
Win	6–0	Will Cruthirds	Submission (rear naked choke)	Fight Force International: Blood and Sand 11	April 28, 2012	1	1:55	Biloxi, Mississippi, United States	
Win	5–0	J.C. Pennington	Submission (triangle choke)	XFC: Chaos at the Castine Center 2	April 7, 2012	3	3:12	Mandeville, Louisiana, United States	Won the vacant XFC Lightweight Championship.
Win	4–0	Booker Arthur	Decision (unanimous)	XFC: Nightmare on the Northshore	October 29, 2011	3	5:00	Mandeville, Louisiana, United States	
Win	3–0	Paul Soileau	Submission (guillotine choke)	Felix's FC: Night of Champions 2	July 23, 2011	1	0:32	Gonzales, Louisiana, United States	Won the Felix's FC Lightweight Championship.
Win	2–0	Phil Daru	Submission (armbar)	XFC: Chaos at the Castine Center	July 9, 2011	1	1:55	Mandeville, Louisiana, United States	Lightweight debut.
Win	1–0	Derrick Breaux	Submission	In Ya Face: Karnival Karnage	March 12, 2011	1	0:39	Houma, Louisiana, United States	Welterweight debut.

== Mixed martial arts exhibition record ==
Exhibition record breakdown		
2 matches	2 wins	0 losses
By knockout	1	0
By submission	1	0

Res.	Record	Opponent	Method	Event	Date	Round	Time	Location	Notes
Win	2–0	Jason Knight	TKO (punches)	The Ultimate Fighter: Team McGregor vs. Team Chandler	Aug 8, 2023 (airdate)	2	2:56	Las Vegas, Nevada, United States	The Ultimate Fighter 31 Semi-final round.
Win	1–0	Lee Hammond	Submission (guillotine choke)	The Ultimate Fighter: Team McGregor vs. Team Chandler	Jul 4, 2023 (airdate)	2	3:21	Las Vegas, Nevada, United States	The Ultimate Fighter 31 Quarterfinal round.

== See also ==
- List of Dana White's Contender Series alumni
- List of male mixed martial artists
