= The Ultimate Fighter: Team McGregor vs. Team Chandler =

UFC mixed martial arts television series

- Genre: Reality, Sports
- Created by: Frank Fertitta III; Lorenzo Fertitta; Dana White
- Starring: Dana White; Conor McGregor; Michael Chandler
- Country of origin: United States

Production
- Running time: 60 minutes

Original release
- Network: ESPN
- Release: May 30 – August 15, 2023

Related
- The Ultimate Fighter: Team Peña vs. Team Nunes; The Ultimate Fighter: Team Grasso vs. Team Shevchenko

The Ultimate Fighter: Team McGregor vs. Team Chandler (also known as The Ultimate Fighter 31 and TUF 31) was a 2023 installment of the Ultimate Fighting Championship (UFC)-produced reality television series The Ultimate Fighter on ESPN+. Former UFC Featherweight and Lightweight Champion Conor McGregor and former three-time Bellator Lightweight World Champion Michael Chandler (also former lightweight title challenger) served as head coaches for the season.

The season featured male bantamweights and lightweights. Filming began in February in Las Vegas and the show debuted on May 30. The cast was officially announced on March 4, featuring eight former UFC fighters (including The Ultimate Fighter: Undefeated featherweight winner Brad Katona) and eight promotional newcomers.

== Background ==
The UFC originally planned the season to be coached by former interim UFC Lightweight Champions Justin Gaethje and Dustin Poirier, but Poirier turned the opportunity down.

== Cast ==
=== Coaches ===
Team McGregor:

- Conor McGregor, Head Coach
- John Kavanagh, Assistant Coach
- Owen Roddy, Striking/Boxing Coach
- Cian Cowley, Muay Thai Coach
- Phil Sutcliffe, Boxing Coach

Team Chandler:

- Michael Chandler, Head Coach
- Ryan Bader, Assistant Coach
- Robert Drysdale, Jiu Jitsu Coach
- Jason Strout, Striking Coach
- Greg Jones, Wrestling Coach

=== Fighters ===
- Team McGregor
  - Bantamweights: Rico DiSciullo, Mando Gutierrez, Carlos Vera, and Trevor Wells.
  - Lightweights: Lee Hammond, Nate Jennerman, Aaron McKenzie, and Landon Quiñones
- Team Chandler
  - Bantamweights: Hunter Azure, Cody Gibson, Brad Katona*, and Timur Valiev
  - Lightweights: Kurt Holobaugh, Austin Hubbard, Jason Knight, and Roosevelt Roberts

* Brad Katona switched from Team Chandler to Team McGregor during the semi-finals

== Episodes ==
Episode 1: A Notorious Return (May 30, 2023)

- Coaches Conor McGregor and Michael Chandler meet at the UFC Apex and discuss of a potential fight that might happen soon between the two. The weight class is the principal subject of discussion, with McGregor suggesting that he will be the one deciding which weight class they will fight in.
- UFC president Dana White welcomes McGregor and Chandler as well as all the participants in the new season of TUF, composed of bantamweight and lightweight fighters.
- White explains that there will be a new format this year: fighters of each division are separated in two categories: veterans, composed of fighters who already fought in the UFC, and prospects.
- White then explains that there will be a coin toss to determine which coach will pick first. The winner of the toss will decide which division they will pick from, as well as if they pick veterans or prospects. The other coach gets the other pick, choosing if they pick veterans or prospects, this time in the other division.
- McGregor wins the coin toss, and picks the lightweight prospects, which leaves Chandler with the 155 veterans. Chandler proceeds to pick the bantamweight veterans, leaving McGregor with the 135 prospects.
- On the second day, McGregor and Chandler both hold training sessions to evaluate their fighters, since they will need to seed them from 1 to 4, in order to determine the matchups to start the tournament. Chandler opts for a calculated approach, mostly composed of drills, while McGregor opts for grueling sparring sessions.
- Chandler wins the second coin toss, meaning he gets to choose the first fight. In each fight, 1 will face 4, and 2 will face 3.
- In the first matchup of the season, Team McGregor's #2 ranked lightweight Nate Jennerman faces Team Chandler's #3 ranked lightweight Roosevelt Roberts.
- Roosevelt Roberts defeats Nate Jennerman by KO (punches) at 0:08 of round 1.
- The first bantamweight fight is announced: Trevor Wells (McGregor #2) vs Timur Valiev (Chandler #3)

Episode 2: A Hefty Price to Pay (June 6, 2023)

• After a last-minute medical issue forces the next fight to be postponed, the teams have to regroup and prepare two new fighters for action. With tensions rising between the teams, Conor makes a surprise visit to the house. Then, bantamweights take center stage in the second quarterfinal fight.

- On the day of his fight with Timur Valiev, Trevor Wells is deemed unable to compete by the Nevada Athletic Commission.
- After talking with Michael Chandler and Valiev, Dana White agrees to postpone the fight to a later date.
- As such, Mando Gutierrez (McGregor #1) vs Cody Gibson (Chandler #4) is moved up to be the first bantamweight fight.
- Conor McGregor and his coaches step by the house.
- Cody Gibson defeats Mando Gutierrez by TKO (switch knee and punches) at 3:23 of round 1

Episode 3: No Easy Path (June 13, 2023)

• A young superfan visits Conor at the Apex to show off his custom-made action figures. Then, Aaron McKenzie tries to snap Team McGregor’s losing streak when he faces Austin Hubbard of Team Chandler in the third quarterfinal fight.

Episode 4: Heart, Soul, and Brain (June 20, 2023)

• Trevor Wells is now cleared to fight. Because of the fight between Trevor Wells and Timur Valiev being postponed due to a rash on Wells face, a discussion about what weightclass they should finally fight in when the time comes dominates the episode. Should they have to make weight again or fight at a heavier weight? The episode ends with the two fighters battling it out in the octagon in a catchweight fight.

Episode 5: Conflict of Interest (June 27, 2023)

• Conor visits the TUF house to put his fighters through one of his famous workouts. Chandler struggles to coach his next fighter, TUF 27 winner Brad Katona, whose allegiance may lie with the other team. Then, Brad faces off against prospect Carlos Vera to determine who will be the next bantamweight semifinalist.

Episode 6: Break Your Nose (July 4, 2023)

• Kurt Holobaugh, the only fighter to have been signed and cut twice from the UFC, hopes that the third time is the charm as he prepares for his quarterfinal fight. McGregor has high hopes for his next athlete, fellow Irishman and protégé, Lee Hammond. After a hard-fought battle, mayhem ensues at the Apex between the coaches.

Episode 7: There Are Levels to This (July 11, 2023)

• The fallout from Team McGregor’s most recent loss, and Conor’s outburst at the Apex, is felt throughout the house. With tension mounting, Jason Knight tries to continue Chandler’s win streak in his fight against Landon Quiñones but has to overcome a training injury to do so.

Episode 8: Protect Ya Neck (July 18, 2023)

• Only one fight remains as Team McGregor tries to avoid the first-ever quarterfinals sweep in TUF history. Then, after the showdown in the Octagon, Dana meets with the coaches and fighters to set the semifinal matchups.

Episode 9: It’s Personal, Not Just Business (July 25, 2023)

• After the fighters learn the semifinal matchups, which are posted at the TUF House, Conor pays both teams a visit and makes a feast of Irish stew. Then, friends and Chandler teammates’ Roosevelt Roberts and Austin Hubbard face off in the first semifinal fight.

Episode 10: Just Win, Baby (August 1, 2023)

• TUF 27 winner Brad Katona officially switches teams to prepare for his semifinal fight. Timur Valiev receives inspiration from a visit by UFC lightweight champion Islam Makhachev. Then, Katona and Valiev face off with a spot in the bantamweight final on the line.

Episode 11: Mississippi vs Louisiana (August 8, 2023)

• Conor McGregor and Michael Chandler square off in the coldest Coaches Challenge in TUF history. Then, teammates and bayou buddies Kurt Holobaugh and Jason Knight battle it out in a lightweight semifinal matchup, with a spot in the final on the line.

== Tournament bracket ==
=== Bantamweight bracket ===
Quarter-finals
Carlos Vera	2
Brad Katona	UD
Trevor Wells	2
Timur Valiev	UD
Hunter Azure	2
Rico DiSciullo	KO
Mando Gutierrez	1
Cody Gibson	TKO

Semi-finals
Brad Katona*	SD
Timur Valiev	3
Rico DiSciullo	1
Cody Gibson	SUB

Final
Brad Katona	UD
Cody Gibson	3

* Brad Katona switched from Team Chandler to Team McGregor in the semi-final round.

=== Lightweight bracket ===
Quarter-finals
Roosevelt Roberts	KO
Nate Jennerman	1
Aaron McKenzie	2
Austin Hubbard	UD
Jason Knight	SUB
Landon Quiñones	1
Lee Hammond	2
Kurt Holobaugh	SUB

Semi-finals
Roosevelt Roberts	3
Austin Hubbard	SD
Jason Knight	2
Kurt Holobaugh	TKO

Final
Austin Hubbard	2
Kurt Holobaugh	SUB

	Team McGregor
	Team Chandler
UD	Unanimous Decision
MD	Majority Decision
SD	Split Decision
SUB	Submission
(T)KO	(Technical) Knock Out

== See also ==
- The Ultimate Fighter
- List of UFC events
- 2023 in UFC
- List of current UFC fighters
