= Titan Fighting Championships =

American mixed martial arts events series

Titan Fighting Championship
- Company type: Private
- Industry: Mixed martial arts promotion
- Founded: 2005; 21 years ago
- Founder: Joe Kelly
- Headquarters: Pompano Beach, FL, United States
- Key people: Jeff Aronson; Lex McMahon
- Website: www.titanfighting.com

Titan Fighting Championship (Titan FC) is an American mixed martial arts promotion based out of Pompano Beach, Florida. Their shows were originally run in and near Kansas City and have since expanded to include venues all over North America and eventually, international locations. Since July 2015, Titan FC events are broadcast on the UFC online streaming service UFC Fight Pass, which also showcases a library of the organization's previous events.

== History ==
=== Founding ===
Titan Fighting Championships was founded in 2005 by veteran fight promoter and, at the time, Bellator Fighting Championships' director of operations, Joe Kelly. The organization was originally based in Kansas City and was headquartered in the city's historic Memorial Hall, where the organization held the majority of their early events. Memorial Hall was exclusively leased to Kelly's sports and entertainment promotion company Titan Entertainment, from which the MMA organization took its name.

=== Broadcast deal with HDNet ===
On December 13, 2010, Titan Fighting Championships announced that they had struck a deal with the cable and satellite television network HDNet (later relaunched as AXS TV) to broadcast their next event, Titan FC 16, live on the network. The event would take place on January 28, 2011, and was headlined by a super heavyweight bout between former two-time UFC Heavyweight champion Tim Sylvia and former The Ultimate Fighter: Heavyweights cast member Abe Wagner. Prior to the airing of the promotion's second show on the network, Titan FC 17: Lashley vs. Ott, CEO Joe Kelly announced that the organization had signed a three-year extension with HDNet to broadcast their live events under the network's HDNet Fights label. Kelly subsequently resigned from his position at Bellator FC in order to focus full-time on running Titan FC.

Titan FC would initially air a total of nine live events on the HDNet/AXS TV networks, including a "Fight for the Troops" event taking place on June 15, 2012, at the Marshall Army Airfield at Fort Riley, Kansas, and conclude with Titan FC 24: Johnson vs. Jones which aired on August 24, 2012.

=== Merger with RFA ===
On October 11, 2012, officials for the Nebraska-based MMA promotion Resurrection Fighting Alliance (RFA) announced that they had acquired Titan Fighting Championships, along with certain fighter contracts, as well as the organization's television deal with, now, AXS TV. The goal was to combine the talent of both organizations under one umbrella, the RFA. Titan FC owner and president Joe Kelly would be brought in as the Vice President of the newly merged company, with seasoned MMA manager, and Black House gym owner, Ed Soares acting as the President.

=== Resurgence and new ownership ===
Seven months after the RFA buyout, the Titan FC promotion was resurrected when founder Joe Kelly bought back the organization in 2013 and produced two more shows on his own: Titan FC 25: Lashley vs. Asplund in June, and Titan FC 26: Hallman vs. Hornbuckle in August, both of which were aired live on AXS TV.

In December 2013, Jeff Aronson, the former chairman and co-founder of the fighter management company Alchemist Management, purchased a majority stake in Titan FC from the promotion's founder and president Joe Kelly. Jeff Aronson would serve as company's new CEO with, longtime friend and business partner, Lex McMahon serving as Titan FC's COO. Kelly would remain as the organization's president and minority owner.

Unlike other organizations in the past who tried to go head to head with the UFC and failed, CEO Jeff Aronson hoped to form a professional relationship with the UFC and has attempted to position Titan FC as an unofficial feeder league for the organization. The newly overhauled Titan FC has now focused itself on finding unsigned prospects, and giving top level veterans who have hit a rough patch, a platform on which to get themselves noticed, or get their career back on track.

"No one is going to take on Zuffa and win at this point. It's just not going to happen."

— Titan FC CEO Jeff Aronson.

Along with the new ownership came new rules for the organization's fighter contracts and bonus structure, and an increased focus on fan involvement. As an incentive to get fighters to perform their best, and thus garner the attention of the larger organizations, Titan FC awards "finishing bonuses" to all fighters who finish their fights by either knockout or submission. Also, to entice up and coming prospects and veteran fighters to sign with the organization, Titan FC now offers a no-questions-asked "Zuffa out" clause in all their contracts, in case the opportunity arises for the fighter to leave the organization and sign with the UFC. The organization hopes that these incentives will encourage the fighters to put on a better show for the fans, and intends to increase the fan experience by offering VIP packages and holding giveaways, contests, and autograph sessions at all of their live events. To reflect their new position in the MMA community, and philosophy towards fights and fighter contracts, Titan FC has since adopted the motto "'Fans, Fighters First.'".

=== Broadcast deal with CBS Sports ===
On January 14, 2014, Titan FC officials announced that the first show under their new ownership, Titan FC 27: Ricci vs. Gurgel, would now be broadcast live on CBS Sports and that the organization had signed an eight-event deal with the television network. As part of the deal, Titan FC prelim bouts would also be streamed live on the network's website, CBSSports.com. Titan FC officials also announced that CBS Sports had hired top MMA trainer, and TriStar Gym owner, Firas Zahabi and UFC hall of famer Stephan Bonnar to provide the commentary for all Titan FC events. Titan FC 27: Ricci vs. Gurgel debuted on the CBS Sports Network on February 28, 2014.

Titan FC 30: Brilz vs. Magalhães would take place on September 26, 2014, and stands out as being the first time in Titan FC's history that the organization would crown a divisional champion, as two former UFC veterans faced off for the inaugural Titan FC Light Heavyweight title. Four time World Jiu-Jitsu Championship gold medalist and former The Ultimate Fighter contestant Vinny Magalhães would submit wrestling standout Jason Brilz with a guillotine choke in the fourth round to claim this inaugural title.

Titan FC crowned their second divisional champion at Titan FC 32: Green vs. Siler on December 19, 2014. That night Bellator MMA tournament veteran Desmond Green defeated former UFC fighter and The Ultimate Fighter contestant Steven Siler to claim the inaugural Titan FC Featherweight championship.

Over the course of their yearlong partnership Titan FC would eventually air a total of seven live cards on the CBS Sports network, spanning seven cities in seven different states, and culminating in their largest event to date, Titan FC 33: Green vs Holobaugh. Titan FC 33 took place on March 20, 2015, in Mobile, Alabama at the Mobile AeroFest music and art festival, a two-day-long not-for-profit event designed to raise money to support injured U.S. military service members and veterans. The card would feature a total of four separate title fights, three of which would crown the inaugural championships for Titan FC's heavyweight, lightweight and bantamweight divisions; and was headlined by the organization's first ever championship title defense as Desmond Green sought to defend his newly acquired featherweight title.

=== Broadcast deal with UFC Fight Pass ===
On June 15, 2015 UFC officials announced that Titan FC has signed a contract with the organization to air all future live events exclusively on the UFC's subscription-based digital streaming service, UFC Fight Pass.

"I think we should look at being on UFC Fight Pass. So I gave Dana (White) a call and said it was something we'd like to pursue. He set the wheels in motion and, after quite a bit of negotiating, we finally got a deal done."

— Titan FC COO Lex McMahon.

The first event to be held on the service, Titan FC 34: Healy vs. Edwards, aired on July 18, 2015, and featured a total of four title fights, including the crowning of Titan FC's inaugural flyweight champion when Tim Elliott defeated fellow UFC veteran Iliarde Santos for the vacant belt. Additionally, it was announced by UFC officials that the entire Titan FC library of past events would be added to the "On Demand" section of the Fight Pass online service.

== Rules ==
Titan Fighting Championships follows the Unified Rules of Mixed Martial Arts, which were first established in April 2000. The Unified Rules of Mixed Martial Arts have been adopted by every state athletic commission that holds mixed martial arts events throughout the United States.

Under the Unified Rules of Mixed Martial Arts there are no groin strikes, eye gouging, kicking or kneeing a grounded opponent, downward elbows, strikes to the back of the head, head butting, biting, or grabbing the fence. Upon a violation of the rules, referee can either warn the fighter, take a point away, or disqualify the fighter depending upon the regularity and severity of the foul.

=== Rounds ===
All non-world championship fights in Titan FC consist of three, five-minute rounds, with one-minute rest periods between rounds. All world championship fights consist of five, five-minute rounds, with one-minute rest periods between rounds.

=== Weight divisions ===
Titan FC currently uses eight weight classes for men:

Weight class name	Upper limit	
Weight class name	in pounds (lb)	in kilograms (kg)
Flyweight	125	57
Bantamweight	135	61.2
Featherweight	145	65.8
Lightweight	155	70.3
Welterweight	170	77.1
Middleweight	185	83.9
Light Heavyweight	205	93.0
Heavyweight	265	120.2

Titan FC currently uses two weight classes for women:

Weight class name	Upper limit	
Weight class name	in pounds (lb)	in kilograms (kg)
Strawweight	115	52
Flyweight	125	57

=== Match outcome ===
Matches usually end via:

- Submission: a fighter clearly taps the mat or his opponent, or verbally submits. Also a technical submission may be called when a fighter either loses consciousness or is on the verge of serious injury while in a hold.
- Knockout: a fighter is put into a state of unconsciousness resulting from any legal strike.
- Technical Knockout (TKO): If the referee decides a fighter cannot continue, the fight is ruled as a technical knockout. Technical knockouts can be classified into three categories:
  - referee stoppage (the referee ends the fight because one fighter is unable to intelligently defend himself)
  - doctor stoppage (a ring side doctor decides that it is unsafe for the fighter to continue the bout due to excessive bleeding or physical injuries)
  - corner stoppage (a fighter's cornerman signals defeat for their own fighter)
- Judges' Decision: Depending on scoring, a match may end as:
  - unanimous decision (all three judges score a win for fighter A)
  - majority decision (two judges score a win for fighter A, one judge scores a draw)
  - split decision (two judges score a win for fighter A, one judge scores a win for fighter B)
  - unanimous draw (all three judges score a draw)
  - majority draw (two judges score a draw, one judge scoring a win)
  - split draw (one judge scores a win for fighter A, one judge scores a win for fighter B, and one judge scores a draw)

Note: In the event of a draw, it is not necessary that the fighters' total points be equal. However, in a unanimous or split draw, each fighter does score an equal number of win judgments from the three judges (0 or 1, respectively). A fight can also end in a technical decision, technical submission, disqualification, forfeit, technical draw, or no contest. The latter two outcomes have no winners.

The ten-point must scoring system is in effect for all bouts in Titan. Three judges score each round with the winner of each round getting 10 points while the loser gets 9 points or less. The only way that an even round can occur is if the fighter that won the round has a point deducted for a foul. Rounds scored 10-8 and 10-7 are typically scored when a fighter wins a round in dominant fashion.

=== Fouls ===
The following is a list of fouls outlined by the states that regulate MMA, as established by the Nevada State Athletic Commission:

1. Butting with the head
2. Eye gouging of any kind
3. Biting
4. Hair pulling
5. Fish hooking
6. Groin attacks of any kind
7. Putting a finger into any orifice or into any cut or laceration on an opponent (see Fish-hooking)
8. Small joint manipulation
9. Striking to the spine or the back of the head (see Rabbit punch)
10. Striking downward using the point of the elbow (see Elbow (strike))
11. Throat strikes of any kind, including, without limitation, grabbing the trachea
12. Clawing, pinching or twisting the flesh
13. Grabbing the clavicle
14. Kicking the head of a grounded opponent
15. Kneeing the head of a grounded opponent
16. Stomping a grounded opponent
17. Kicking to the kidney with the heel
18. Spiking an opponent to the canvas on his head or neck (see Piledriver)
19. Throwing an opponent out of the ring or fenced area
20. Holding the shorts or gloves of an opponent
21. Spitting at an opponent
22. Engaging in unsportsmanlike conduct that causes an injury to an opponent
23. Holding the ropes or the fence
24. Attacking an opponent on or during the break
25. Attacking an opponent who is under the care of the referee
26. Attacking an opponent after the bell (horn) has sounded the end of a round
27. Flagrantly disregarding the instructions of the referee
28. Timidity, including, without limitation, avoiding contact with an opponent, intentionally or consistently dropping the mouthpiece or faking an injury
29. Interference by the corner
30. Throwing in the towel during competition

When a foul is charged, the referee in their discretion may deduct one or more points as a penalty. If a foul incapacitates a fighter, then the match may end in a disqualification if the foul was intentional, or a no contest if unintentional. If a foul causes a fighter to be unable to continue later in the bout, it ends with a technical decision win to the injured fighter if the injured fighter is ahead on points, otherwise it is a technical draw.

== Current champions ==
Division	Upper weight limit	Champion	Since	Title Defenses	Next Fight
Heavyweight	265 lb (120 kg)	Vacant	Titan FC 64; March 20, 2022		
Light Heavyweight	205 lb (93 kg)	Vacant	March 4, 2015		
Middleweight	185 lb (84 kg)	(Brazil) Bruno Assis	Titan FC 70; July 2, 2021	0	
Welterweight	170 lb (77 kg)	(United States) Will Brooks	Titan FC 82; June 2, 2023	0	
Lightweight	155 lb (70 kg)	(United States) Richie Lewis	Titan FC 83; July 21, 2023	0	
Featherweight	145 lb (66 kg)	(Jordan) Ali al-Qaisi	Titan FC 71; August 6, 2021	0	
Bantamweight	135 lb (61 kg)	(United States) Ira Lukowsky	Titan FC 73; December 17, 2021	0	
Flyweight	125 lb (57 kg)	(Brazil) Victor Dias	Titan FC 68; March 26, 2021	1	
Women's Bantamweight	135 lb (61 kg)	Vacant	October 7, 2017	0	
Women's Flyweight	125 lb (57 kg)	Uninaugurated			
Women's Strawweight	115 lb (52 kg)	Uninaugurated			
Combat Grappling	170 lb (77 kg)	(Brazil) Gesias Cavalcante	Titan FC 60; May 29, 2020	0	
Kickboxing Heavyweight	265 lb (120 kg)	(United States) Alex Nicholson	Titan FC 75; April 10, 2022		

== Title history ==
=== Heavyweight Championship ===
206 to 265 lbs (93 to 120 kg)

No.	Name	Event	Date	Reign	Defenses
1	(United States) Chase Gormley def. Jon Madsen	Titan FC 33; Mobile, AL, US	March 20, 2015	104 days	
Gormley vacated the title on July 2, 2015, after he signed with Bellator MMA.
2	(Suriname) Said Sowma def. Bobby Brents	Titan FC 64; Miami, Florida, US	September 25, 2020	30 days	
Sowma vacated the title in late 2020, after he signed with Bellator MMA.
3	(United States) Jesse James def. Oscar Sosa	Titan FC 28; New Albany Indiana, Lexington KY	July 29, 2001	96 days	(Vacated title after retirement)
4	(Brazil) Valter Walker	Titan FC 82; Novi Sad, Serbia	June 2, 2023	1110 days	

=== Light Heavyweight Championship ===
186 to 205 lbs (84 to 93 kg)

No.	Name	Event	Date	Reign	Defenses
1	(Brazil) Vinny Magalhães def. Jason Brilz	Titan FC 30; Cedar Park, TX, US	September 26, 2014	159 days	
Magalhães vacated the title on March 4, 2015, after he signed with the World Series of Fighting.

=== Middleweight Championship ===
171 to 185 lbs (77 to 84 kg)

No.	Name	Event	Date	Reign	Defenses
1	(Brazil) Bruno Assis def. Shane O'Shea	Titan FC 70; Miami, FL, US	July 2, 2021	1810 days (incumbent)	

=== Welterweight Championship ===
156 to 170 lbs (70 to 77 kg)

No.	Name	Event	Date	Reign	Defenses
1	(United States) Belal Muhammad def. Steve Carl	Titan FC 38; Miami, FL, US	April 30, 2016	41 days	
Muhammad vacated the title on May 25, 2016, after he signed with the UFC.
2	(Brazil) Dhiego Lima def. David Michaud	Titan FC 39; Coral Gables, FL, US	June 10, 2016	175 days	
3	(Jamaica) Jason Jackson	Titan FC 42; Coral Gables, FL, US	December 2, 2016	235 days	
Jackson vacated the title on July 25, 2017, after he signed with the Dana White's Tuesday Night Contender Series.
4	(United States) Jose Caceres def. Rami Hamed	Titan FC 49; Ft. Lauderdale, FL, US	April 6, 2018	84 days	
5	(Slovenia) Uros Jurisic	Titan FC 50; Ft. Lauderdale, FL, US	June 29, 2018	437 days	
6	(United States) Michael Graves def. Jared Gooden for the interim Title	Titan FC 53; Ft. Lauderdale, FL, US	March 15, 2019	618 days	1. def. Yuri Villefort at Titan FC 59 on Feb. 28, 2020; 2. def. Oton Jasse at Titan FC 65 on Nov. 22, 2020
On September 9, 2019, Graves was promoted to undisputed Welterweight Champion as Jurisic was stripped of his title due to ongoing medical issues and a bout outside of his Titan FC contract.
-	(Russia) Kamal Magomedov def. Italo da Silva Goncalves for the interim Title	Titan FC 57; Dominican Republic	October 19, 2019	132 days	
Magomedov was stripped of the Interim title when he pulled out of a fight with the current Welterweight Champion Michael Graves on Feb. 28, 2020.
Graves was stripped of the title when he missed weight for his title defense on Nov. 22, 2020.
6	(United States) Dilano Taylor def. Carlos Matos	Titan FC 69; Santo Domingo, Dominican Republic	May 14, 2021	287 days	1. def. Marcus Edwards at Titan FC 73 on Dec. 17, 2021
Taylor vacated the title in February 2022 when he signed with PFL.
7	(United States) Will Brooks def. Predrag Bogdanovic	Titan FC 82; Novi Sad, Serbia	June 2, 2023	1110 days (incumbent)	

=== Lightweight Championship ===
146 to 155 lbs (66 to 70 kg)

No.	Name	Event	Date	Reign	Defenses
1	(United States) Pat Healy def. Kurt Kinser	Titan FC 33; Mobile, AL, US	March 20, 2015	183 days	1. def. Marcus Edwards at Titan FC 34 on July 18, 2015
2	(United States) Rick Hawn	Titan FC 35; Ridgefield, WA, US	September 19, 2015	31 days	
Rick Hawn retired, vacating the Lightweight title.
3	(Brazil) Gesias Cavalcante def. Pat Healy	Titan FC 39; Coral Gables, FL, US	June 10, 2016	56 days	
4	(Brazil) Freddy Assuncao	Titan FC 40; Coral Gables, FL, US	August 5, 2016	469 days	
-	(United States) Kurt Holobaugh def. Gesias Cavalcante for the Interim Title	Titan FC 44; Pembroke Pines, FL, US	May 19, 2017	52 days	
Assuncao was stripped of the title due to inactivity & Holobaugh vacated the title to compete on Dana White's Tuesday Night Contender Series
5	(Brazil) Raush Manfio def. Chazz Walton	Titan FC 46; Pembroke Pines, FL, US	November 17, 2017	224 days	1. def. Lee Henry Lilly at Titan FC 48 on February 16, 2018
Manfio was stripped of the title when he was defeated by Sidney Outlaw at Titan FC 50. Outlaw didn't make weight, so wasn't eligible to win title.
-	(United States) Martin Brown def. Beibit Nazarov for the Interim Title	Titan FC 51; Almaty, Kazakhstan	December 21, 2018	302 days	
Brown was stripped of the title when he failed to make weight at Titan FC 57 in his bout against Johansser Paulino.
-	(Brazil) Rafael Alves def. Felipe Douglas for the Interim Title	Titan FC 54; Ft. Lauderdale, FL, US	April 26, 2019	487 days	
Rafael Alves vacates title to fight on Dana White's Contender Series.
6	(United States) Landon Quinones def. Reynaldo Acevedo	Titan FC 75; Dominican, Republic	April 10, 2022	468 days	1. def. Yemi Oduwole at Titan FC 80 on November 18, 2022
Quinones vacates title to fight on The Ultimate Fighter: Team McGregor vs. Team Chandler.
7	(United States) Richie Lewis def. Charlie Decca	Titan FC 83; Hallandale Beach, FL, US	July 21, 2023	1061 days (incumbent)	

=== Featherweight Championship ===
136 to 145 lbs (61 to 66 kg)

No.	Name	Event	Date	Reign	Defenses
1	(United States) Desmond Green def. Steven Siler	Titan FC 32; Lowell, MS, US	December 19, 2014	92 days	
2	(United States) Kurt Holobaugh	Titan FC 33; Mobile, AL, US	March 20, 2015	121 days	
3	(United States) Andre Harrison	Titan FC 34; Houston, TX, US	July 18, 2015	3986 days	1. def. Desmond Green at Titan FC 35 on September 19, 2015; 2. def. Steven Siler at Titan FC 37 on March 4, 2016; 3. def. Deivison Ribeiro at Titan FC 39 on June 10, 2016; 4. def. Alexandre Bezerra at Titan FC 41 on September 9, 2016
Harrison vacated the title on November 23, 2016, after he signed with the World Series of Fighting.
4	(Cuba) Luis Raul Gomez def. Sodiq Yusuff	Titan FC 47; Pembroke Pines, FL, US	December 15, 2017	112 days	
5	(United States) Jason Soares	Titan FC 49; Ft. Lauderdale, FL, US	April 6, 2018	589 days	1. def. Caio Uruguai at Titan FC 52 on January 25, 2019; 2. def. Ariston Franca at Titan FC 54 on April 26, 2019; 3. def. Andrew Whitney at Titan FC 56 on August 23, 2019
Soares vacated title on November 16, 2019 after he signed with the PFL
6	(Haiti) Olivier Murad def. Muhammadjon Naimov	Titan FC 67; Miami, FL, US	February 12, 2021	175 days	
Murad vacated the title in August when he signed on to compete in Dana White's Contender Series.
7	(Jordan) Ali AlQaisi def. Andrew Whitney	Titan FC 71; Miami, FL, US	August 6, 2021	1775 days (incumbent)	

=== Bantamweight Championship ===
126 to 135 lbs (up to 61 kg)

No.	Name	Event	Date	Reign	Defenses
1	(Wales) Brett Johns def. Walel Watson	Titan FC 33; Mobile, AL, US	March 20, 2015	121 days	
Johns was stripped of the title on July 17, 2015, after failing to make weight for his first title defense at Titan FC 34.
2	(Brazil) Anderson dos Santos def. Ricky Simon	Titan FC 37; Ridgefield, WA, US	March 4, 2016	119 days	
dos Santos was stripped of the title on August 5, 2016, when he was defeated by Andrew Whitney in a non title tournament Semi Final at Titan FC 40
3	(Kyrgyzstan) Farkhad Sharipov def. Andrew Whitney	Titan FC 42; Coral Gables, FL, US	December 2, 2016	168 days	
4	(United States) Jose Torres	Titan FC 44; Ft. Lauderdale, FL, US	May 19, 2017	378 days	1. def. Gleidson DeJesus at Titan FC 46 on November 17, 2017
Torres vacated the title in June of 2018 after signing a contract with the UFC
5	(Brazil) Rudson Caliocane def. Edir Terry	Titan FC 52; Fort Lauderdale, FL, US	January 25, 2019	284 days	
6	(Mexico) Irwin Rivera def. Matt Wagy for the interim Title	Titan FC 55; Fort Lauderdale, FL, US	June 28, 2019	136 days	1. def. Danny Sabatello at Titan FC 58 on December 20, 2019
Rivera was promoted to an undisputed champion after Caliocane vacated the title on Nov. 11, 2019 when he suffered a brain stem injury at a Future FC event. Eventually in mid-June 2020, Rivera vacated his title to sign with the UFC.
7	(United States) Danny Sabatello def. Raymond Ramos	Titan FC 61; Fort Lauderdale, FL, US	June 28, 2020	327 days	1. def. Da'Mon Blackshear at Titan FC 67 on February 12, 2021
Sabatello vacated the title in May of 2021 after signing a contract with the Bellator MMA
8	(United States) Ira Lukowsky def. Alberto Montes	Titan FC 73; Miami, FL, US	December 17, 2021	1642 days (incumbent)	

=== Flyweight Championship ===
116 to 125 lb (53 to 57 kg)

No.	Name	Event	Date	Reign	Defenses
1	(United States) Tim Elliott def. Iliarde Santos	Titan FC 34; Kansas City, MO, US	July 18, 2015	384 days	1. def. Felipe Efrain at Titan FC 35 on September 19, 2015; 2. def. Pedro Nobre at Titan FC 37 on March 4, 2016
Elliott vacated the title in December of 2016 after signing a contract with the UFC
2	(United States) Jose Torres def. Abdiel Velazquez for the Interim title	Titan FC 40; Coral Gables, FL, US	August 5, 2016	665 days	1. def. Pedro Nobre at Titan FC 43 on January 21, 2017; 2. def. Alberto Orellano at Titan FC 48 on February 16, 2018
Torres vacated the title in June of 2018 after signing a contract with the UFC
3	(United States) Juan Puerta def. Kazbek Ashimov	Titan FC 51; Almaty, Kazakhstan	December 21, 2018	448 Days	1. def. Claudio Ledesma at Titan FC 55 on June 28, 2019; 2. def. Reynaldo Adolfo de los Santos at Titan FC 57 on October 19, 2019
Puerta vacated the title on March 13, 2020 after signing a contract with Combate Americas
4	(United States) Wascar Cruz def. Christian Ynastrilla	Titan FC 63; Miami, Florida	August 28, 2020	210 Days	
5	(Brazil) Victor Dias	Titan FC 68; Miami, Florida	March 26, 2021	1908 days (incumbent)	1. def. Ryskulbek Ibraimov at Titan FC 72 on September 17, 2021

=== Women's Bantamweight Championship ===
126 to 135 lbs (up to 61 kg)

No.	Name	Event	Date	Reign	Defenses
1	(Brazil) Kalindra Faria def. Carina Damm	Titan FC 41; Coral Gables, FL, US	September 9, 2016	393 days	
Faria vacated the title in October of 2017 after signing a contract with the UFC					

=== Women's Flyweight Championship ===
116 to 125 lb (53 to 57 kg)

No.	Name	Event	Date	Reign	Defenses
1	N/A	N/A	N/A		

=== Women's Strawweight Championship ===
106 to 115 lb (48 to 52 kg)

No.	Name	Event	Date	Reign	Defenses
1	N/A	N/A	N/A		

=== Combat Grappling Welterweight Championship ===
156 to 170 lbs (70 to 77 kg)

No.	Name	Event	Date	Reign	Defenses
1	(Brazil) Gesias Cavalcante def. Raush Manfio	Titan FC 60; Miami, FL, US	May 29, 2020	2209 days (incumbent)	

=== Kickboxing Heavyweight Championship ===
206 to 265 lbs (93 to 120 kg)

No.	Name	Event	Date	Reign	Defenses
1	(United States) Alex Nicholson def. Oscar Sosa	Titan FC 75; Dominican, Republic	April 10, 2022	1528 days (incumbent)	

== Notable fighters ==
Notable fighters who have competed in Titan FC.

- Bobby Lashley
- Alan Belcher
- Bobby Voelker
- Michael Graves
- Zak Cummings
- L.C. Davis
- Jay Hieron
- James Krause
- Rob Kimmons
- Tim Elliott
- Brett Johns
- Anthony Johnson
- David Branch
- Belal Muhammad
