= Professional wrestling holds =

Professional wrestling holds include a number of set moves and pins used by performers to immobilize their opponents or lead to a submission. This article covers the various pins, stretches and transition holds used in the ring. Some wrestlers use these holds as their finishing maneuvers, often nicknaming them to reflect their character or persona. Moves are listed under general categories whenever possible.

== Stretches ==
An element borrowed from professional wrestling's catch wrestling origins, stretches (or submission holds) are techniques in which a wrestler holds another in a position that puts stress on the opponent's body. Stretches are usually employed to weaken an opponent or to force them to submit, either vocally or by tapping out: slapping the mat, floor, or opponent with a free hand three times. Many of these holds, when applied vigorously, stretch the opponent's muscles or twist their joints uncomfortably, hence the name. Chokes, although not in general stress positions like the other stretches, are usually grouped with stretches as they serve the same tactical purposes. In public performance, for safety's sake, stretches are usually not performed to the point where the opponent must submit or risk injury. Likewise, chokes are usually not applied to the point where they cut off the oxygen supply to the opponent's brain.

=== Head, face, chin, and shoulder stretches ===
==== Camel clutch ====
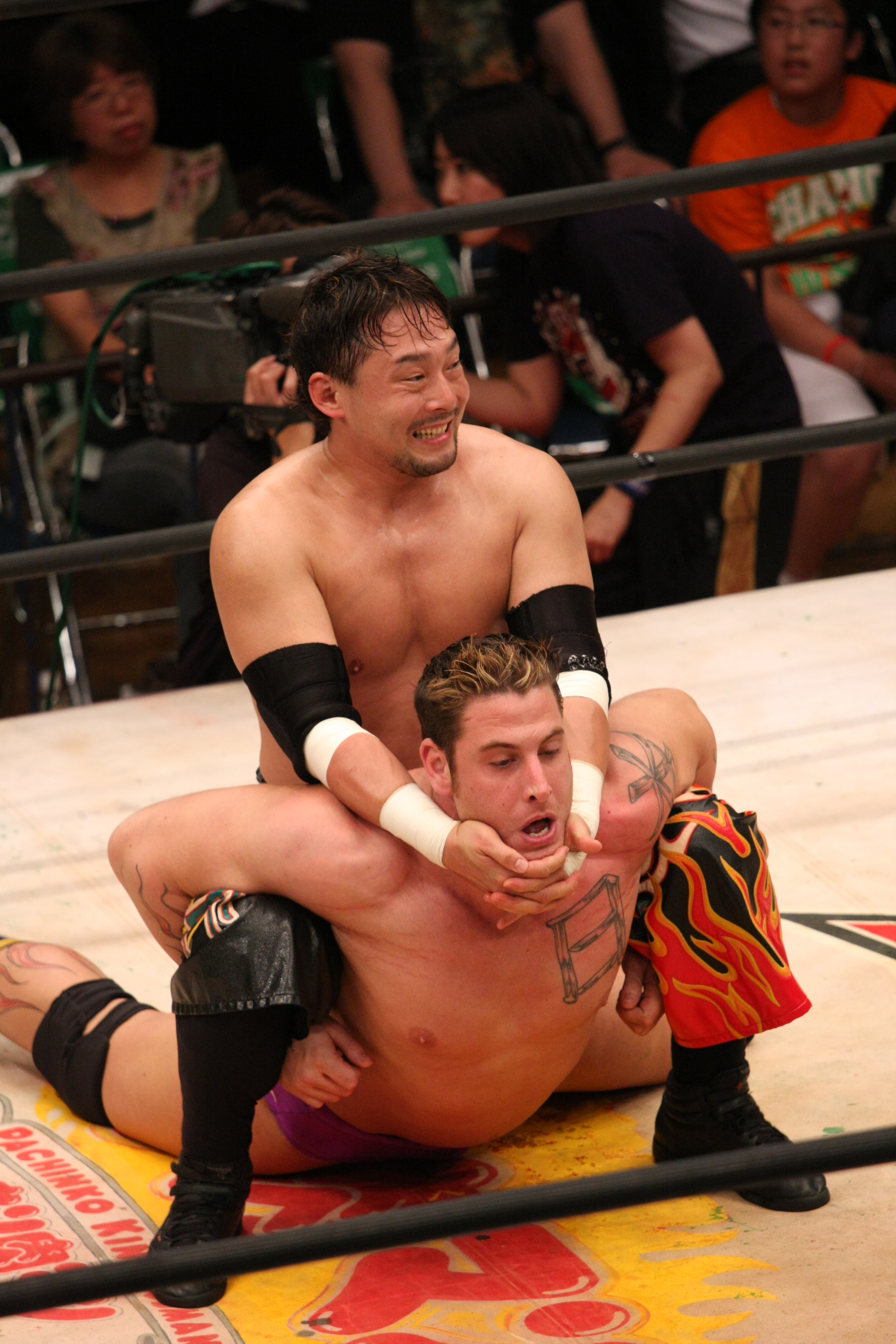
Tajiri applying a camel clutch to Rene Bonaparte

The wrestler begins the hold by standing over a face-down opponent. The wrestler reaches down to pull the opposing wrestler up slightly, sits on the opponent's back, and places both of the opponent's arms across their thighs, usually locking at least one by placing the arm in the crook of their knee. The wrestler then reaches forward, cups their hands with their fingers interlocking, grabs the opponent's chin in their cupped hands, and leans back while pulling on the opponent's chin and applying pressure to their back. A camel clutch can also refer simply to a rear chinlock while seated on the back of an opponent, without placing the arms on the thighs. The move was invented by Gory Guerrero in Mexico, where it was called la de a caballo (horse-mounting choke), but got its more common name from The Sheik who used it as his finisher. The Iron Sheik also used this version while a heel champion in the WWF. Jinder Mahal also uses this move called the Punjabi Clutch. Miro performs a variation he calls Game Over, where he stomps on his opponent's back before applying the hold, this move was previously called The Accolade when Miro was Rusev in the WWE. A standing variation of the camel clutch is also used, with this variation popularized by Scott Steiner in the late 1990s as he used it as his finisher, dubbed the Steiner Recliner. His nephew Bron Breakker has also used the standing version as well. Another version of this move sees the wrestler standing over the opponent who's face-down reaches for and places the opponent's nearest arm around the wrestler's far waist before applying the hold. WWE wrestler Veer Mahaan used a chickenwing version this move, in which only one of the opponent's arm was draped across his stomach and over his opposite thigh creating more pressure, as a finisher calling it the Cervical Clutch. A rolling variation of the camel clutch is also used, with this variation popularized by Maryse Ouellet, dubbed French Pain. Big Show used a kneeling variation of this move called the Colossal Clutch.

===== Leg-trap camel clutch =====
The attacking wrestler stands over a face-down opponent, facing the same direction. The wrestler first hooks each of the opponent's legs underneath their own armpits as if performing a reverse Boston crab, then reaches down and underneath the opponent's chin with both hands, applying a chinlock, and finally leaning back to pull up the opponent's head and neck.

Another version of the move is similar to a wheelbarrow facebuster, but instead illegally pulls the hair of the opponent while leaning back to pull up the opponent's head and neck.

===== Stepover armlock camel clutch =====
The attacking wrestler stands over a face-down opponent, facing the same direction. The wrestler then grabs one of the opponent's arms in a stepover armlock, turning 360° so the opponent's arm is bent around the leg of the attacking wrestler. The wrestler will then sandwich the arm between their own leg and the side of the opponent's body. The wrestler then reaches forwards and applies a chinlock as in a standard camel clutch, leaning backwards to apply pressure to the upper back and arm.

==== Chinlock ====
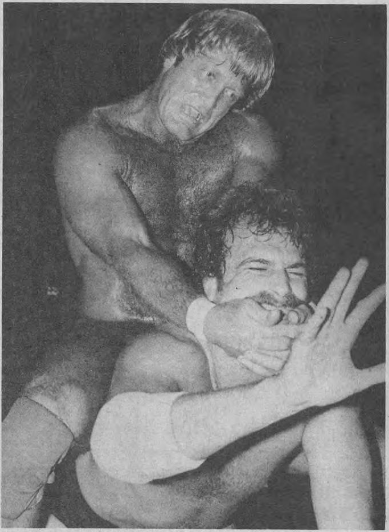
Paul Orndorff applying a chinlock to Jake Roberts

Also known as a rear chinlock, the attacking wrestler crouches down behind a sitting opponent and places their knee into the opponent's upper back, then reaches forward and grasps the opponent's chin with both hands. The attacker then either pulls straight back on the chin or wrenches it to the side.

===== Front chinlock =====
A maneuver similar to a neck wrench where the wrestler faces a bent-over opponent. The attacking wrestler tucks the opponent's top/back of the head into their own chest and wraps an arm around the opponent's neck so that their forearm is pressed against the opponent's throat. The wrestler then places their own spare arm under the other hand and over the opponent's back to lock in the hold, compressing the opponent's neck. The attacking wrestler can then arch backwards, pulling the opponent's head downward.

===== Reverse chinlock =====
This move sees the attacker kneel behind a sitting opponent and wrap around one arm under the opponent's chin and lock their hands. As with a sleeper hold, this move can also be performed from a standing position. Another variation of this hold, referred to as a bridging reverse chinlock, sees the attacking wrestler crouch before a face-down opponent and wrap around one arm under the opponent's chin and lock their hands before applying a bridge.

==== Clawhold ====
Also known as the "iron claw", the claw involves the attacker gripping the top of the head of the opponent with one hand and squeezing the tips of their fingers into the opponent's skull, thereby applying five different points of pressure. This can be transitioned into a clawhold STO or iron claw slam.

There is also double-handed version sometimes known as a head vise. The wrestler performing the hold approaches their opponent from behind and grips their head with both hands. While in the vise, the wrestler can control their opponent by squeezing the temples and bring them down to a seated position where more pressure can be exerted. It was invented and used by Baron von Raschke, as well as many members of the Von Erich family, and Blackjack Mulligan. The double-handed version was a signature submission of The Great Khali, dubbed the Vice Grip.

===== Mandible claw =====
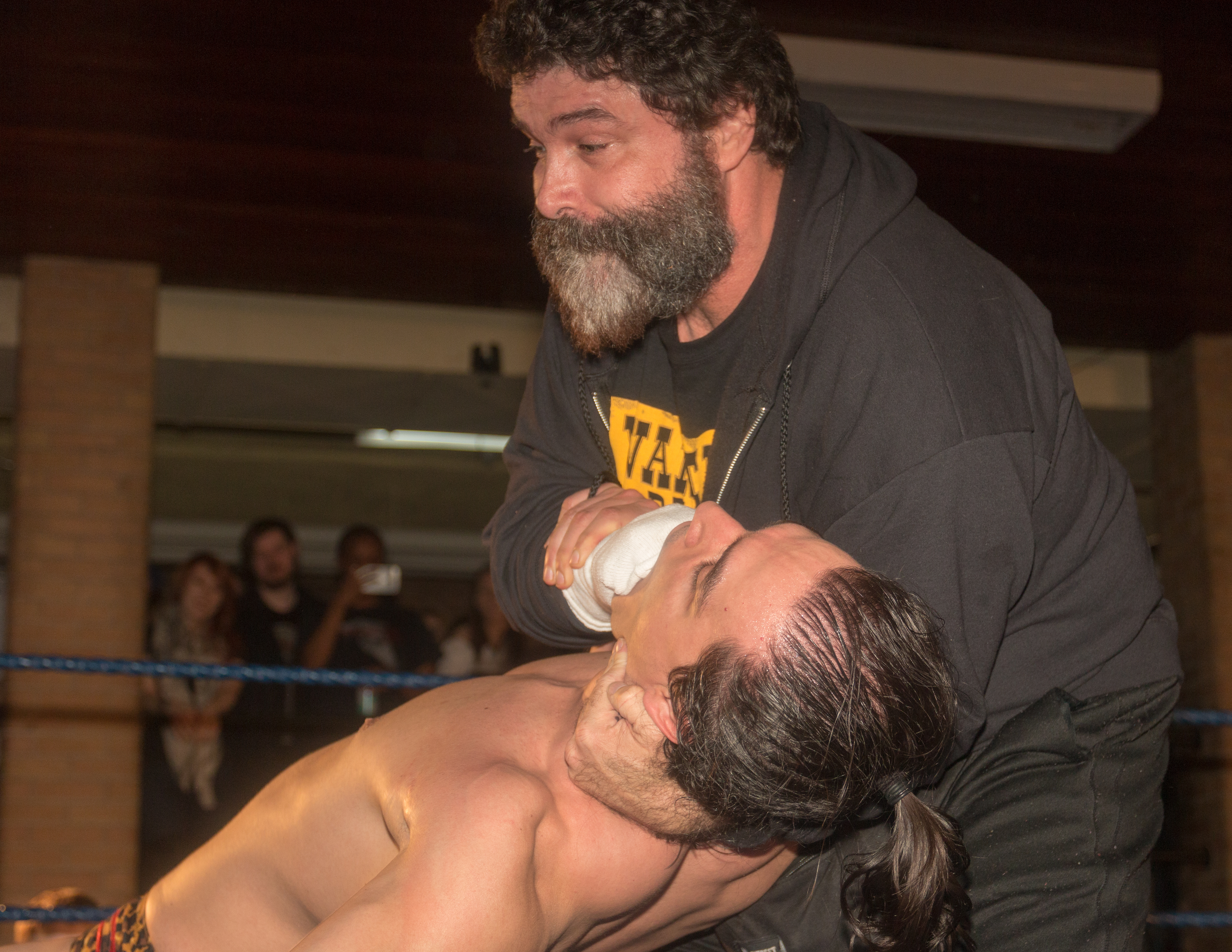
Mick Foley applying his mandible claw hold, with his sock puppet "Mr. Socko" present, on RJ City

A maneuver which, when applied correctly against an individual, is purported to cause intense, legitimate pain.

The hold is applied when the aggressor places their middle and ring fingers into the opponent's mouth, sliding them under the tongue and jabbing into the soft tissue found at the bottom of the mouth. The thumb (and sometimes palm) of the same hand is placed under the jaw, and pressure is applied downward by the middle and ring fingers while the thumb/palm forces the jaw upwards, which is purported to compress the nerves in the jaw and thus render the opponent's jaw paralyzed; this, therefore, prevents the opponent from breaking the hold by biting the wrestler's fingers, as Mick Foley explained to Vince McMahon when questioned about it during his interviews prior to joining the WWF in 1996. Although Foley popularized the move, it was invented by Sam Sheppard, a physician who, in 1966, took up professional wrestling and was said to have derived the move from his knowledge of human anatomy. Under the advice of Paul Heyman and with Foley's blessing, Bray Wyatt also used the hold as part of his "The Fiend" persona. Bo Dallas also uses the move as part of his "Uncle Howdy" persona as a tribute to Wyatt.

===== Shoulder claw =====
Similar to a clawhold, the attacking wrestler applies a nerve lock onto the opponent's shoulder(s) using their hands and fingers for a submission attempt. It is also called a Trapezius Claw due to the muscle group targeted. One variant may see the wrestler instead lock their hands on the opponent's neck. It is the finishing hold of African wrestler Shaun Koen of the Africa Wrestling Alliance. This is also known as a Nerve hold, due to its association with The Great Khali and was formerly used by Classy Freddie Blassie.

===== Stomach claw =====
Also known as a stomach vise, just like the original clawhold, the attacker applies a painful nerve hold to the adversary's abdomen, forcing them to submit or pass out. The stomach claw was most famously used by Killer Kowalski, naming it the Kowalski claw.

==== Crossface ====
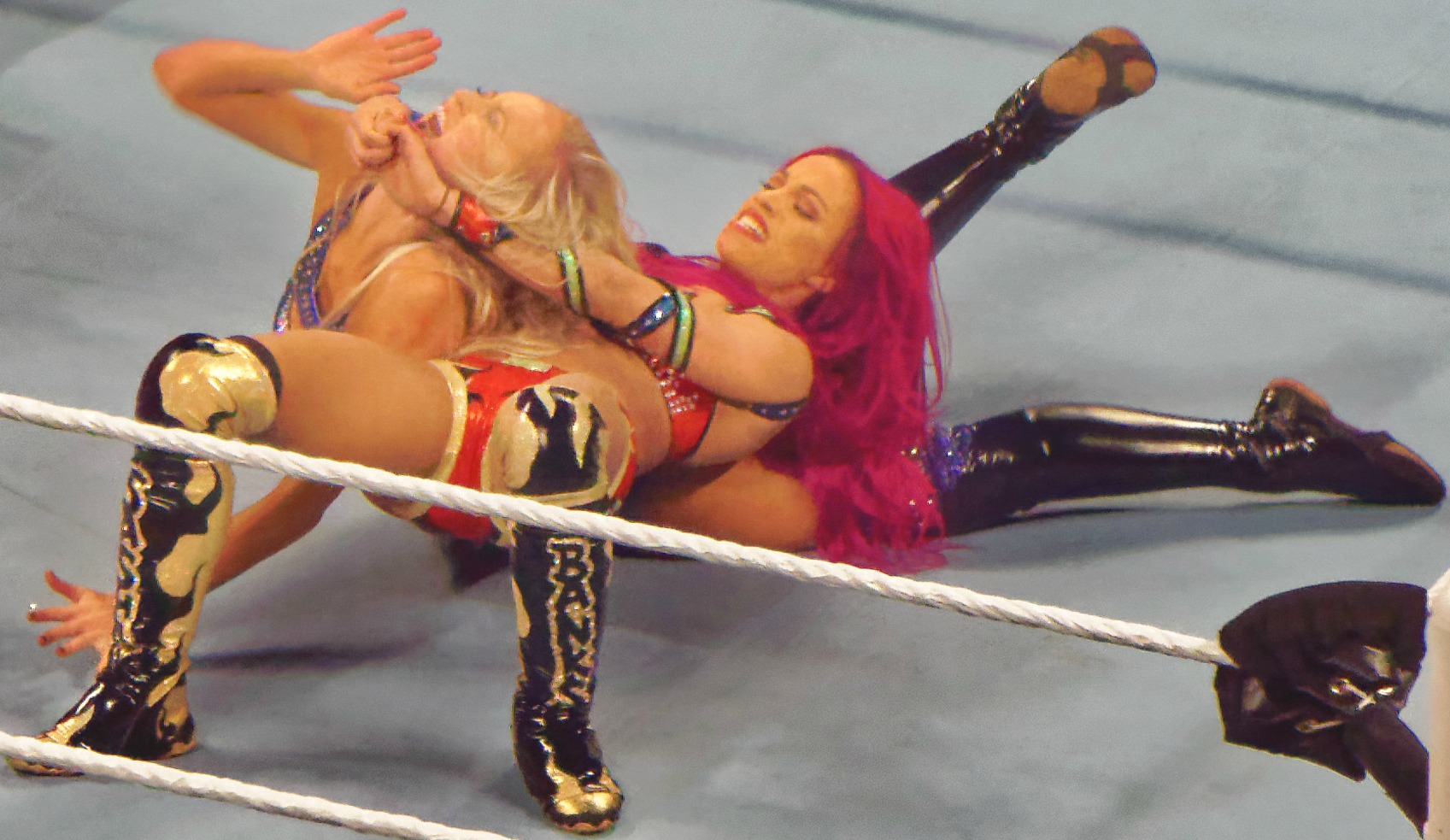
Sasha Banks applying the Bank Statement to Summer Rae in 2016

This neck crank sees the wrestler wrap both hands around the opponent's face and pull back, which applies pressure to the neck and shoulder area. The move is performed in several ways, usually from a prone position involving the wrestler trapping one of the opponent's arms. Chris Benoit's Crippler Crossface was a variation that involved the arm trap. Bobby Roode used the same move in TNA, but not in the WWE since 2016. In Edge's variation, the Glasgow Grin, he used a metal bar on the opponent's mouth. A variation is performed from the omoplata position, which also puts pressure on the trapped arm but requires the wrestler to perform it from a seated position. Often referred to as the LeBell Lock, named for Gene LeBell, Daniel Bryan began popularizing the move under the name Yes! Lock when he joined WWE. It was used by Taiji Ishimori on rare occasions until he joined NJPW in 2018, where he used it frequently as the Yes Lock, named after Bryan. Another variation is performed in a bridging position where the wrestler wraps both hands around the opponent's neck and pulls back, which applies pressure to the neck and bridges on the opponent's back for added leverage. This variation is used as a submission finisher by Sasha Banks as the Bank Statement and by Taka Michinoku as the Just Facelock.

===== Arm-trap crossface =====
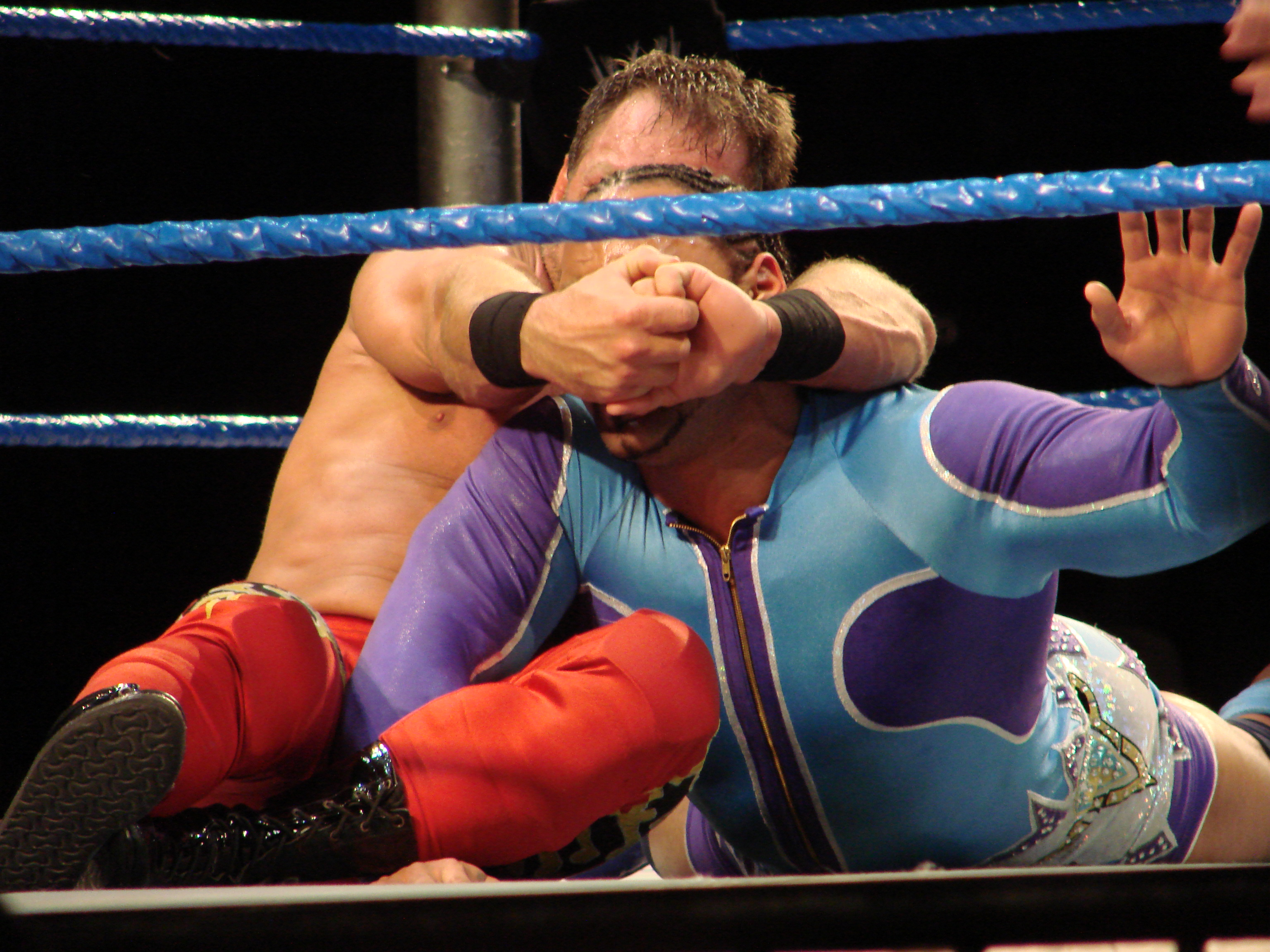
Chris Benoit applying the Crippler Crossface to Montel Vontavious Porter in 2007

Used by Chris Benoit as the Crippler Crossface; in the adjacent picture, he has pulled so far back that he finished the hold seated, which he did not always do. In Daniel Bryan's variation of the move as the LeBell Lock, he takes the opponent's arm and puts it in an omoplata. From here, the wrestler puts the opponent in a crossface, wrenching the neck and shoulder. This move was also used by Kenta as the Game Over.

===== Chickenwing over-the-shoulder crossface =====
The wrestler goes to a fallen opponent and places the opponent's nearest arm over the wrestler's nearest shoulder before applying the crossface, where the attacking wrestler locks their hands around the opponent's chin (or lower face), then pulls back, stretching the opponent's neck and shoulder. Former NXT wrestler Johnny Gargano uses this hold as a finishing submission move, calling it the Garga-No-Escape. Drew McIntyre briefly used it in TNA as the Iron Maiden.

==== Scissored armbar crossface ====
This is a scissored armbar combined with a crossface. The attacking wrestler traps one of the prone opponent's arms in their legs, wraps the opponent's other arm under the attacker's shoulder, and then applies the crossface. Yuji Nagata first popularized this move named the Nagata Lock III as an evolution of his previous hold, the Nagata Lock II, a crossface submission. Batista also used this as the Batista Bite and PAC used this as The Brutalizer (formerly known as the Rings of Saturn during his time in WWE as Neville). Dr. Britt Baker, D.M.D uses this move with a mandible claw hold named the Lockjaw. Bryan Danielson recently will sometimes transition into this move while already having applied the LeBell Lock effectively making this version of the move a Scissored armbar omoplata crossface. Giulia also uses this move dubbed Bianca.

==== Straight jacket crossface ====
Similar to a crossface, this move sees a wrestler standing above a face-down opponent. The wrestler then crosses their opponent's arms, keeping them in place with the legs before applying the crossface.

==== Fish hook ====
The wrestler bends one of their fingers into a hook and uses it to stretch the opponent's mouth or nose. An illegal hold under usual rules. Austin Aries uses a half surfboard variation, called Fish Hook of Doom, where the opponent is lying face down; they grab one of the opponent's wrists with one hand and fish hooks the opponent's mouth with the other, and then places his knees against the opponent's stretched arm and pulls back with his arms. Sheamus calls his version of the move the Predator.

==== Front chancery ====
Also known as "Neck Wrench", the wrestler faces their opponent, who is bent over. The attacking wrestler tucks their opponent's head underneath their armpit and wraps their arm around the neck so that the forearm is pressed against the chin. The wrestler then grabs their own wrist with their free hand, crossing it underneath the opponent's armpit and chest to lock the hold in, compressing the opponent's neck. The attacking wrestler can then arch backwards, pulling the opponent's head forward and thus applying extra pressure on the neck.

===== Front facelock =====
The wrestler faces their opponent, who is bent over. The attacking wrestler tucks the opponent's head underneath their armpit and wraps their arm around the head so that the forearm is pressed against the face. From this point on the wrestler can either grab the opponent's wrist with the free hand and tucks their own head beneath the opponent's armpit and stand upright, locking in the hold, or simply throw the opponent's arm over their own shoulder and grab the opponent's thighs with the free hand. Similar in execution and function to a front chancery, this lock is often used as a setup for a suplex.

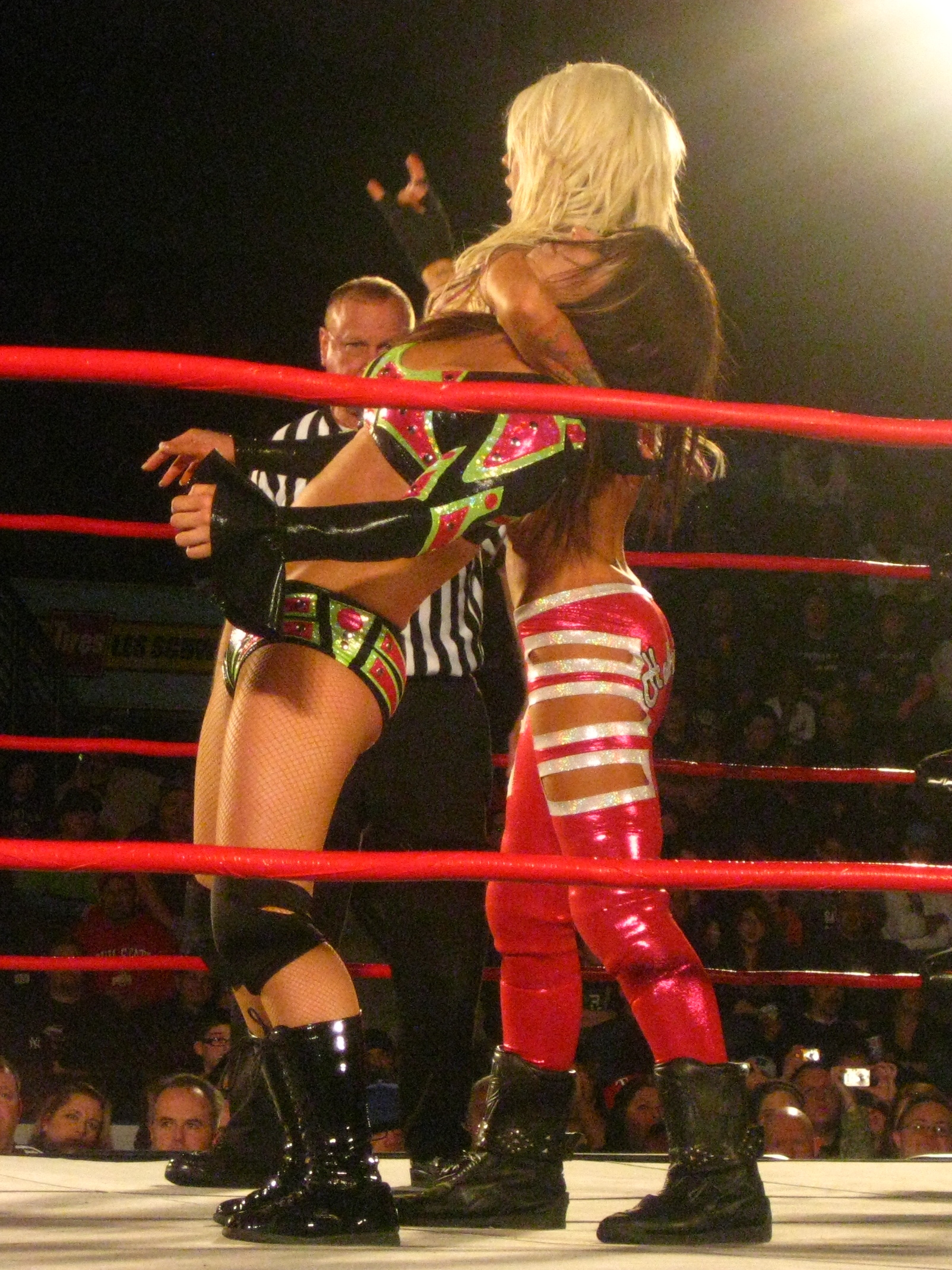
Angelina Love performing an inverted facelock on Sarita

===== Inverted facelock =====
The wrestler stands behind their opponent and bends the opponent backwards. The wrestler tucks the opponent's head face-up under their armpit and wraps their arm around the head, so that their forearm is pressed against the back of the opponent's neck. The wrestler then pulls the opponent's head backwards and up, wrenching the opponent's neck. Naomichi Marufuji invented a single underhook variation, called Perfect Facelock.

====== Bite of the dragon ======
Also commonly known as a dragon bite, this move sees the attacking wrestler behind a standing opponent, pulling them backwards into an inverted facelock and wrapping their legs around the opponent's body with a body scissors. The attacker then arches backwards, putting pressure on the opponent's neck and spine. This move is used on an opponent trapped within the ring ropes, which makes the move illegal under most match rules.

====== Stretch plum ======
The wrestler applies an inverted facelock to a seated opponent, places their far leg between the opponent's legs, and pushes their near leg's knee against the opponent's back. The wrestler then pulls the opponent's head backwards with their arms and the opponent's far leg outwards with their leg. Invented by and named after Plum Mariko, who used it during her career in Japan Women's Pro-Wrestling and JWP Joshi Puroresu. Variations of the move have been used by Eddie Kingston, Chris Hero (Stretch Plum Alpha), and Taichi (Seteii Juhjiro).

===== Side headlock =====
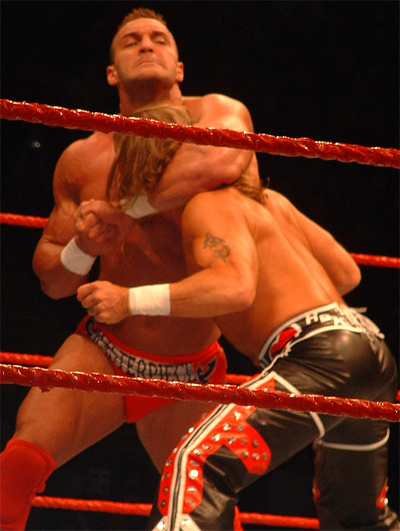
Chris Masters applies a standing side headlock to Shawn Michaels

In this hold, a wrestler who is facing away from an opponent wraps their arm around the neck of an opponent. This is also called a "reverse chancery". Though this is an often-used rest hold, it is also sometimes the beginning of a standard bulldog move.

===== Three-quarter facelock =====
The wrestler stands in front of the opponent while both people are facing the same direction, with some space in between the two. Then, the wrestler moves slightly to the left while still positioned in front of the opponent. The wrestler then uses the near hand to reach back and grab the opponent from behind the head, thus pulling the opponent's head above the wrestler's shoulder. Sometimes the free arm is placed at the top of the opponent's head. The move is also referred to as a "European headlock", due to its prominence in European wrestling. The two-handed version sees the wrestler use both hands and is sometimes referred to as a "¾ chancery", "side head chancery", "grovit" and, most often, a "cravate". This hold is a staple of European style wrestling and technical wrestling influenced by European wrestling. An inverted version of the cravate is used by Chris Hero as part of his "Hangman's Clutch" submissions in which the hand positioning is the same as a normal cravate but the facelock is connected around the face of the opponent, not from behind the opponent's head, thus pulling the opponent's head backwards rather than forwards, putting significant pressure on the neck by stretching it backwards and in other directions toward which the neck would not normally bend. This can also be a setup move for the 3/4 Facelock Jawbreaker, also known as the Stunner, made famous by Steve Austin.

==== Headscissors ====
Also referred to as a neckscissors, this hold sees a wrestler approach a supine opponent and sit next to them before turning onto their side towards the opponent and wrapping their legs around either side of the opponent's head, crossing the top leg after it has gone around the opponent's chin. The wrestler then tightens their grip to choke an opponent by compressing their throat. WWE wrestler Naomi has a crucifix variation calling it Feel the Glow (formerly called Starstruck during her run in Impact Wrestling as Trinity).

===== Standing headscissors =====
The wrestler tucks a bent-over opponent's head in between their legs or thighs. In professional wrestling this move is used to set up powerbombs or piledrivers. A couple of variants are often to be seen.

In the first, having the opponent's head tuck between the attacker's knees, the latter leaps up and releases the hold while landing, causing a whiplash on the opponent's neck. Wrestlers as André the Giant or Junkyard Dog were famed for its using.

In the second one and holding the opponent in the same position, the attacker twists the legs from the hip in a "Neck crank" variant. Popularized by Curt Hennig.

==== Nelson hold ====
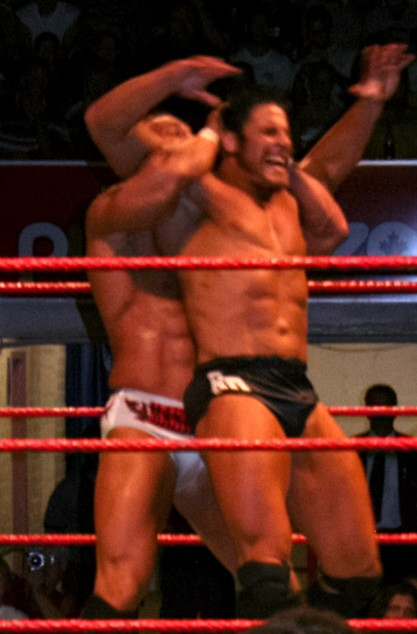
Chris Masters applies the Master Lock (wrenching full nelson) to René Duprée

The nelson hold in professional wrestling usually takes the form of the full nelson, half nelson, or three-quarter nelson. In all three variations, the wrestler slips either one or both arms underneath the opponent's armpits from behind and locks their hands behind their neck, pushing the opponent's head forward against their chest. For a full nelson, the attacker slips both their arms under the opponent's armpits and locks their hands behind their opponent's neck. The half and three-quarter nelsons are usually transition holds, as they are in amateur wrestling. For the half nelson the attacker slips one arm under the opponent's armpit and places it on the neck. The three-quarter nelson is done by performing a half nelson using one hand and passing the other hand underneath the opponent from the same side. The passing hand goes under the opponent's neck and around the far side to the top of the neck, where it is locked with the other hand around the neck. The full nelson, which is illegal in amateur wrestling, is often used as a submission maneuver by certain wrestlers, such as Chris Masters, as shown in the accompanying picture. Ken Patera performed a variation he called the Swinging Neckbreaker (not to be confused with the neckbreaker variation), where he would lock the hold on and lift the opponent off the ground, then spin them in the air. There is also an inverted version where instead of performing the move from behind the opponent, the wrestler stands in front of the opponent and uses the move in the same way as the normal full nelson. Chris Masters and Bobby Lashley uses a standing variation called the Master Lock and the Hurt Lock respectively, where they lock the nelson in and swing their opponent back and forth alternating pressure between their shoulders. Lashley sometimes locks his opponents into a body scissors to immobilize them. The normal Full Nelson hold was also used by Hercules.

===== Sugar hold =====
An old catch wrestling hold made somewhat famous by Stu Hart, this variation of a nelson hold involves the wrestler applying the hold forces the opponent prone on the mat and drives their knees into the opponent's upper back.

==== STF ====
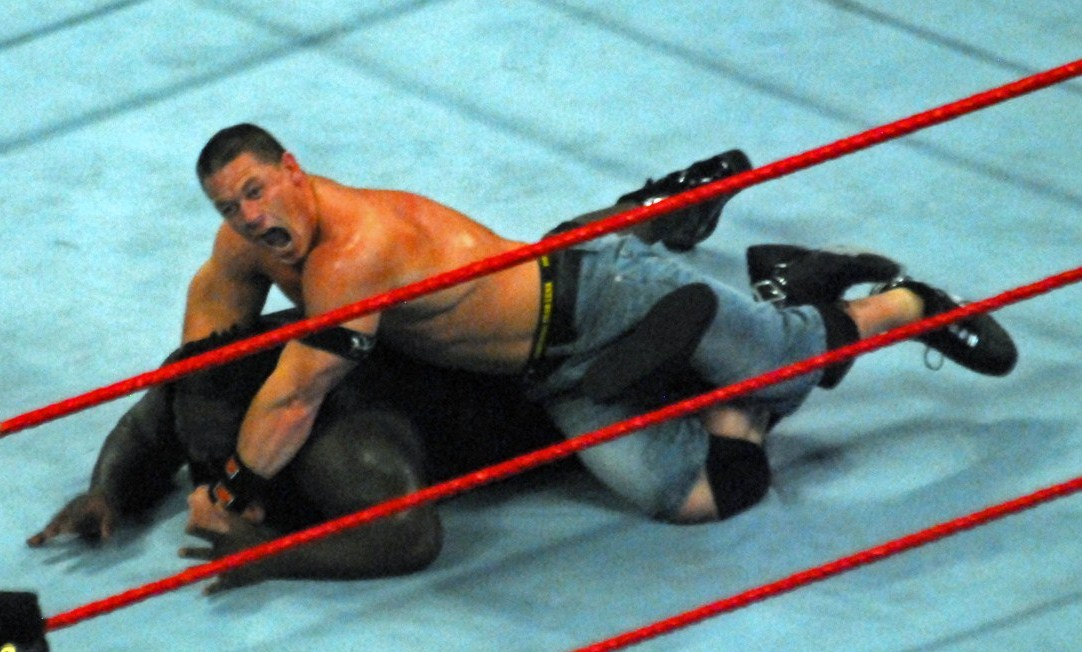
John Cena applying an STF (Then STFU when photo taken) to Mark Henry

STF is short for "Stepover Toehold Facelock". This hold is performed on an opponent who is lying face down on the mat. The wrestler grabs one of the opponent's legs and places the opponent's ankle between their thighs. The wrestler then lies on top of the opponent's back and locks their arms around the opponent's head. The wrestler then pulls back, stretching the opponent's back, neck, and knee. The move was popularised by Lou Thesz, albeit it is a traditional catch wrestling move pre-dating Lou Thesz by many decades; it was further popularised by Masahiro Chono and John Cena, who named it the STFU before the PG Era. Samoa Joe, Jazz, Erik Watts and Nikki Bella have also used this move.

===== Cross-legged STF =====
Starting in the same position as a regular STF, the attacker takes both the opponent's legs, bends them at the knees, and crosses them, placing one ankle in the other leg's knee-pit. The wrestler then grabs the free ankle and places that ankle between their thighs. They then lie on top of the opponent's back and lock their arms around the opponent's face. The wrestler then pulls back, stretching the opponent's back, neck, and knees. Jack Perry uses this as the Snare Trap, while Kazuchika Okada uses a kneeling version called the Red Ink. An arm-trap variation of this move was invented by WWE wrestler William Regal and is currently known as a Regal Stretch.

===== Muta lock =====
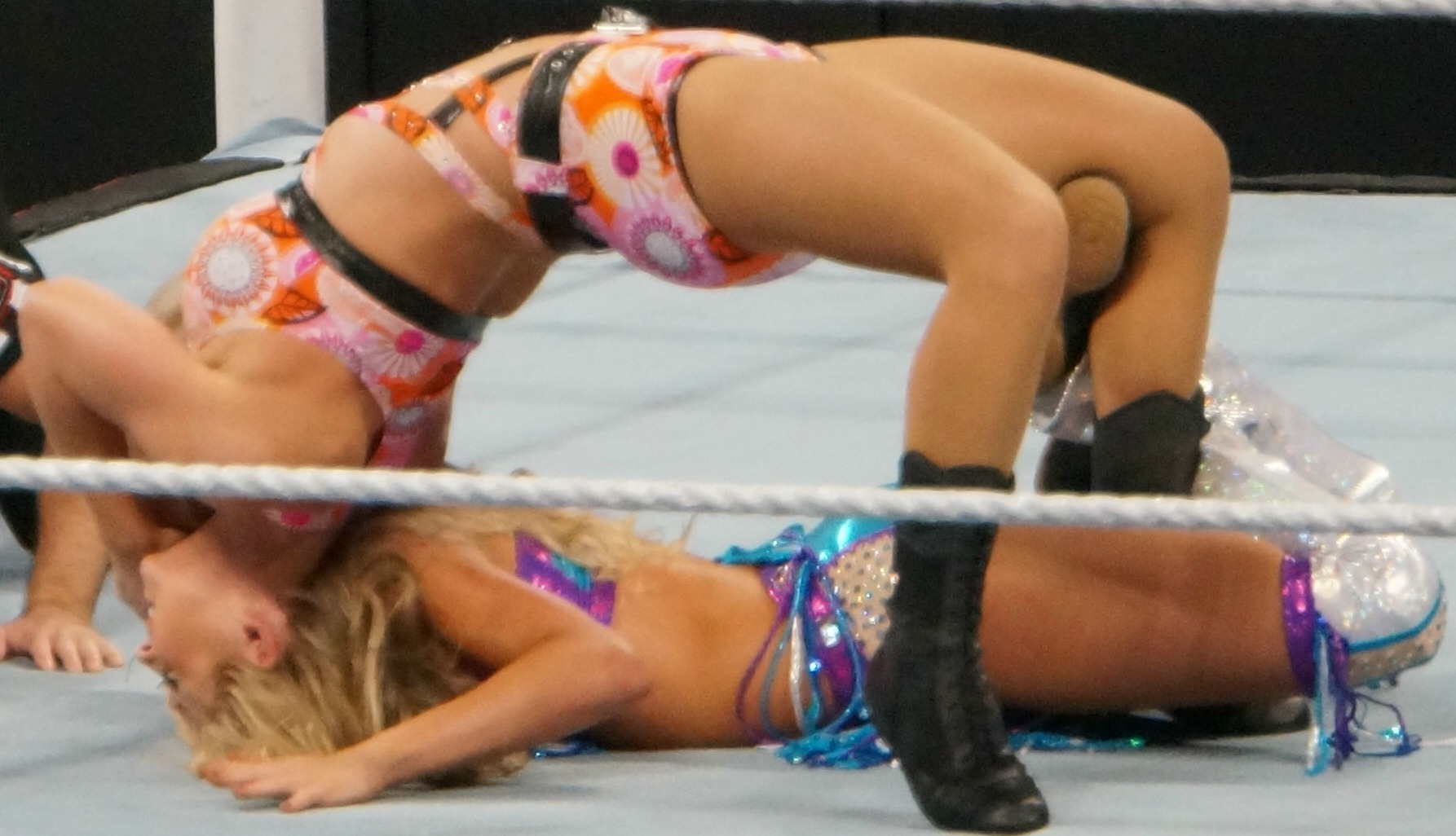
Emma performing the Emma Lock (Muta lock) on Summer Rae

The inverted Indian deathlock facelock, or a "Muta lock". The wrestler first takes the opponent's legs then, bends them at the knees, and crosses them, placing one ankle in the other leg's knee-pit before then turning around so that they are facing away from the opponent and places one of their feet into the triangle created by the opponent's crossed legs. The wrestler then places the opponent's free ankle under their knee-pit and bridges backwards to reach over their head and locks their arms around the opponent's head. Invented by The Great Muta, this move has been adapted and performed by various wrestlers such as Melina Perez (California Dream) and Emma (Emma Lock) as finishing moves, signature moves, and setups to finishers.

===== STS =====
Short for "stepover toehold sleeper", this hold is a modified version of an STF in which the wrestler wraps their arm around the neck of the opponent in a sleeper hold instead of pulling back on the head of the opponent. Popularised by Masahiro Chono.

===== Strangle Hold Alpha =====
Essentially a reverse crucifix armbar with neck submission. The opponent is on their stomach with the attacker to their side, grabbing the near arm and pulling the opponent on their side before stepping over their head with the same leg (if the attacker grabbed the right arm, he'll step over with the right leg). Using that leg as leverage, he'll push the opponent's head downwards and drop to their side so that the opponent must support their own body weight on their squeezed neck. The attacker then uses their free leg to complete the reverse crucifix armbar, trying to hyperextend the elbow.

===== Strangle Hold Beta =====
Essentially a scissored armbar with neck submission. The opponent is on their stomach while the attacker reaches under one of the opponent's arms, locking their hands together. The attacker then drops to the side opposite that of the arm that they grabbed (if they grabbed the right arm, they will fall on their left side). The opponent will thus be on their back, with one of the attacker's legs under the victim's upper back and hooking their free arm. The attacker throws their other leg over the opponent's trapped arm and then behind the opponent's neck, pushing it forward. The attacker can now roll towards their back, creating more pressure on the neck while hyperextending the opponent's arm across their own chest.

===== Strangle Hold Gamma =====
Essentially a step-over armbar with neck submission. The opponent is on their back, wrestler standing to their side and reaching down to grab the opponent's far arm, pulling up. Wrapping their same leg (if they grabbed the left arm, they will use their left leg) around the back of the opponent's neck (against the back of their knee) and bracing their foot against the front of the other shoulder, they steps over their opponent with their other leg, squatting down.

=== Armlocks ===
==== Figure-four armlock ====
Also known as a keylock, Top shoulder lock, Americana, and ude-garami, (a term borrowed from judo). This armlock sees the wrestler grappling the opponent's wrist with the similar hand (for example, if they use the right arm, they would grab the opponent's right wrist), and with the opponent's wrist still clutched, the wrestler bends the opponent's arm (of the grappled wrist) towards or behind the opponent's head. Then, the wrestler passes their other free arm through the "hole" formed by the opponent's bent arm under the biceps, and then catches the opponent's grappled wrist. This would result in the opponent's arm being shaped into a 4. As the opponent's wrist is grabbed by both opponent's hands, along with the bent arm, this applies effective pressure into the opponent. The maneuver can be executed on a standing or a downed (facing upwards) opponent. This move has been used by many wrestlers for many years.

===== Rope-hung figure-four armlock =====
The wrestler approaches an opponent lying against any set of ropes and grabs one of the opponent's wrists with their similar arm. The wrestler then pins the arm with the grappled wrist against the second or top rope to the outside of the ring, passes their other arm from under the opponent's biceps, and grapples the opponent's wrist. The whole maneuver would force the opponent's arm to be bent in the number "4" shape, applying more pressure as the arm is trapped between the second or top rope. The rope-hung figure-four armlock can be also grappled through the bottom rope, if the opponent is lying against it.

==== Omoplata ====
The omoplata (AKA ashi-sankaku-garami in judo) is an armlock that targets the shoulder. The locking mechanism is similar to the kimura lock, but instead of using a figure-four, it is applied using a leg. The omoplata can be applied from the guard, by placing one leg under the opponent's armpit and turning 180 degrees in the direction of that leg, so that the leg moves over the back of the opponent and entangles the opponent's arm. By controlling the opponent's body and pushing the arm perpendicularly away from the opponent's back, pressure can be put on the opponent's shoulder. It is also possible to put pressure on the elbow joint by bending the leg entangling the arm and twisting it in a specific manner. It is usually done to set up the opponent for a crossface. This move can also be known by the underrepresented term coil lock in catch wrestling. This move is notably used by Axiom during his time as A-Kid.

===== Stepover armlock =====
Also known as a spinning armlock. The standing attacking wrestler grabs the wrist of a face down opponent, pulling it towards themselves, then steps over the opponent's outstretched arm, placing one leg to either side. From this point, the wrestler turns 360 degrees, simultaneously bending the arm of the opponent around the attacker's own leg. The wrestler can over-rotate or turn again to apply more pressure on the arm.

The stepover armlock is similar in execution to the spinning toe hold, except that the wrist is held instead of the foot.

==== Armbar ====
The wrestler takes hold of the opponent's arm and twists it, putting pressure on the shoulder and elbow. This may sometimes be preceded by an arm wrench. The armbar's innovation was reportedly 200 years ago, but its true origins remain unknown.

===== Cross armbar =====
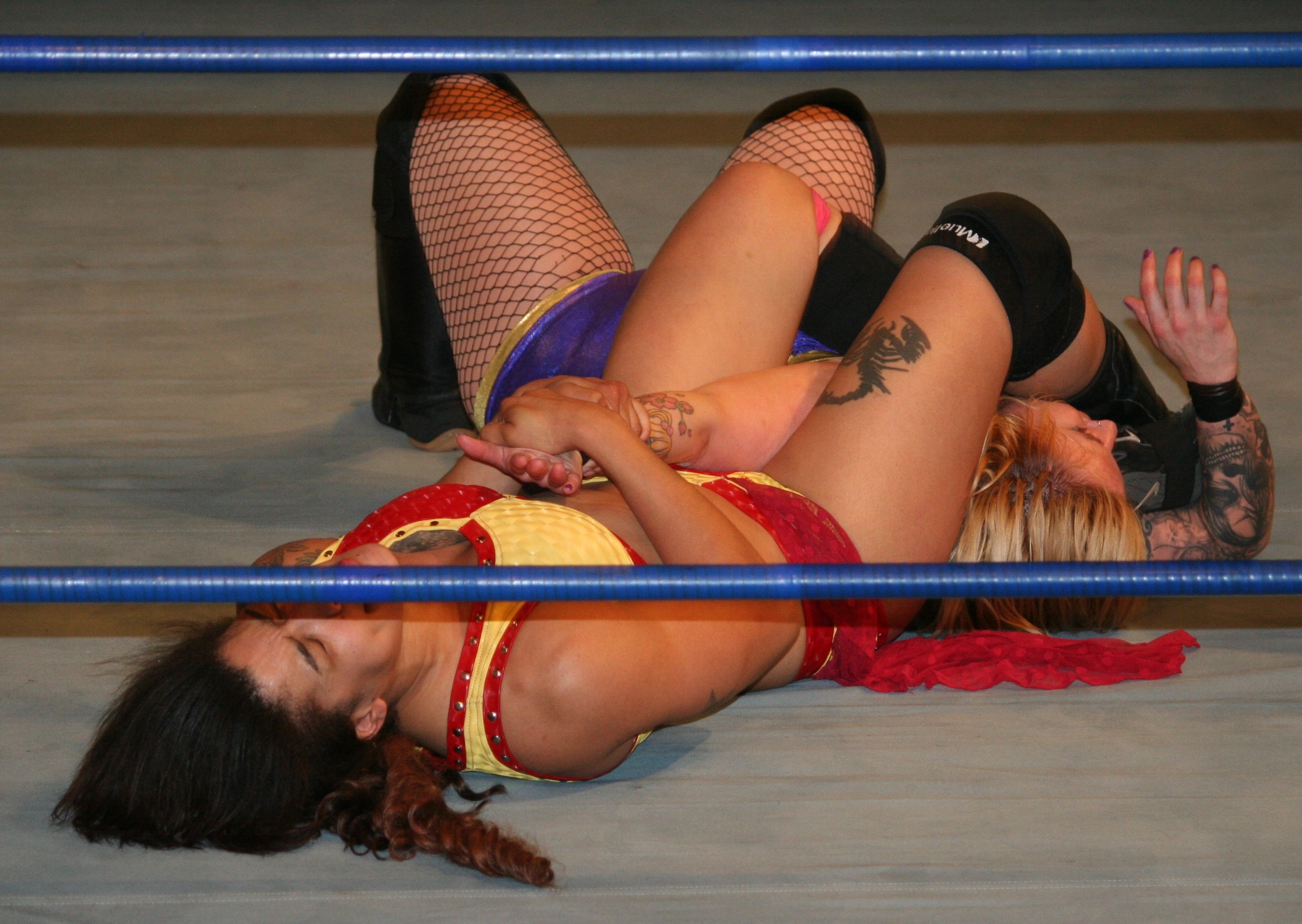
Nicole Savoy applies a cross armbreaker on LuFisto

Also known as a cross armbreaker or straight armbar. The wrestler sits on either side of an opponent who is lying either prone or supine on the mat, with the wrestler's legs scissoring one of the opponent's arms. The wrestler then grabs hold of the wrist of that arm and pulls it upwards, causing hyper extension of the shoulder and elbow. Wrestlers Alberto Del Rio (often the flying variant, see below) and Ronda Rousey perform this move a finisher. Bryan Danielson popularized and invented a variation, dubbed the Danielson Special, where he would flip his opponent with a butterfly suplex before locking in the cross armbar. MJF used a version of this move to a facedown opponent as a finisher dubbed the Friedman Armbar Special.

====== Flying cross armbar ======
This variation begins with the wrestler standing on either side of the bent-over opponent. The wrestler then steps over one of the opponent's arms while holding that arm's wrist, and then rolls or twists their body in mid-air while holding the wrist, forcing the opponent down to their back and ending in a cross armbar. This variant has been used by Alberto Del Rio, A.J. Styles and Asuka. Kushida uses a variation, where goes on the top rope and places his opponent on the turnbuckle and delivers the move.

===== Crucifix armbar =====
The wrestler, situated perpendicular to and behind the opponent, holds the opponent's arm with both arms, pulling the arm across their chest. The wrestler then holds the other arm with their legs, stretching the shoulders back in a crucifying position and hyperextending the arm.

=== Fujiwara armbar ===
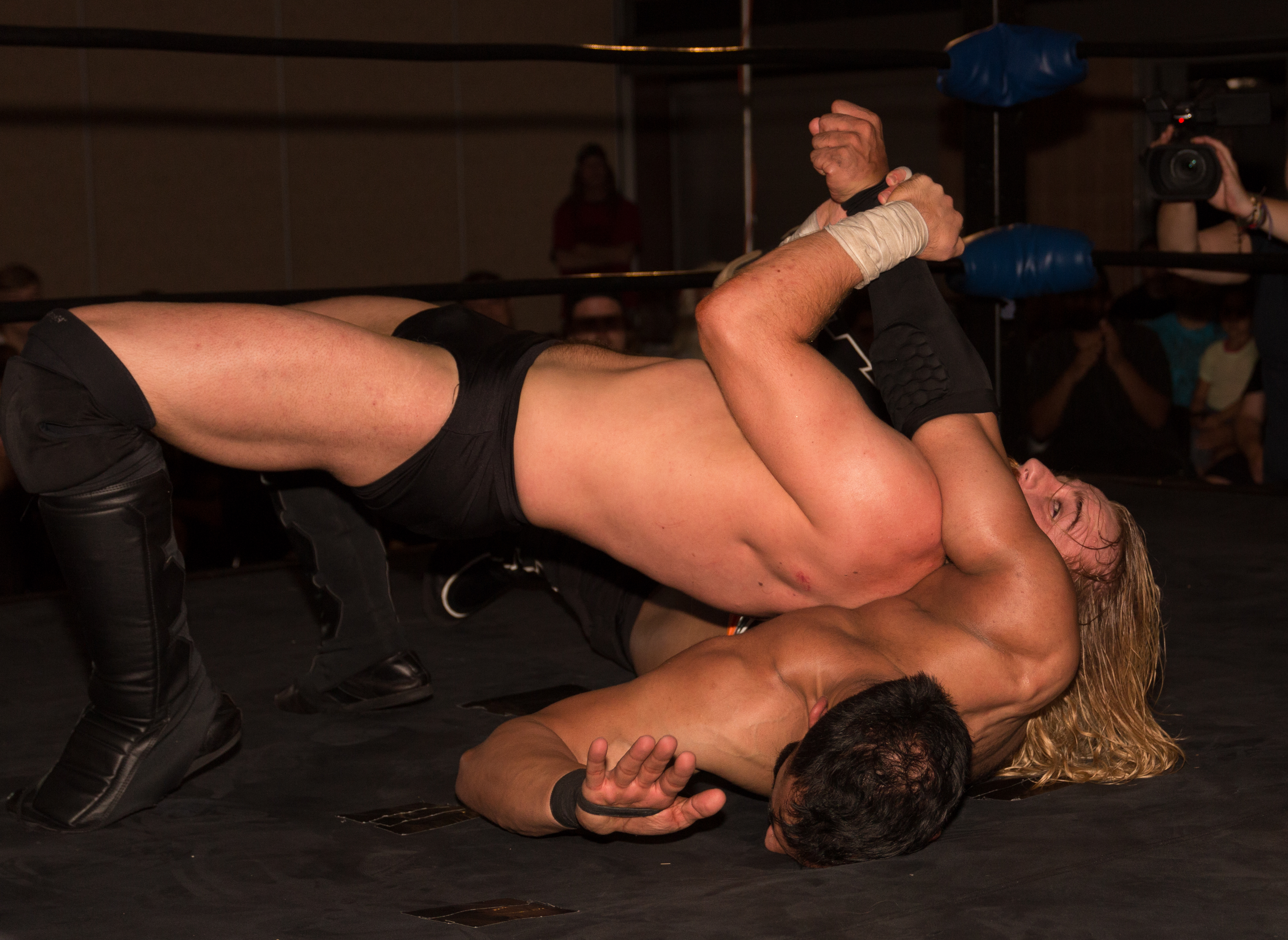
Mark Haskins applying his Bridging Fujiwara armbar on Tarik

Invented by Yoshiaki Fujiwara, it is also known as a short "armbar". With the opponent lying prone, the wrestler lies on the opponent's back, at a 90° angle to them, putting some or all of their weight on the opponent to prevent them from moving. The opponent's arm is then hooked and pulled back into their body, stretching the forearms, biceps, and pectoral muscles. Variations of this can include clasping the opponent's hand instead of hooking the upper arm, for extra leverage and bridging out, while performing the move to increase leverage and immobilize the opponent.

The hold is used by Deonna Purrazzo, Timothy Thatcher, and MJF, the latter calling the move the Salt of the Earth. The bridging version was used by Mark Haskins as the Star Armbar, while Tommaso Ciampa briefly uses it as his submission finisher.

A kneeling variation also exists. Becky Lynch uses it as the Dis-arm-her, where the attacking wrestler takes a face-down opponent's arm in a kneeling position, adding pressure by pulling back on the arm. A reverse version also exists, with the opponent lying on their back, the wrestler lies on the mat, putting some or all of their weight on the opponent to prevent them from moving. The opponent's arm is then hooked and pulled back into their body, stretching the forearms, biceps, and pectoral muscles.

Mexican luchador Místico innovated a variation in which he performs a tilt-a-whirl on the opponent them slams face first with a single-arm takedown and uses the submission hold called the La Mistica. A double arm variation is used by Deonna Purrazzo in addition to her regular variation; she calls the double arm variation Venus de Milo. The double arm variation is also used by Wren Sinclair since her days as Madi Wrenkowski, which she calls the Final Wrench.

==== Hammerlock ====
The wrestler grabs the wrist of the opponent so that the arm is held bent against their back, and their hand is forced upwards towards the neck, thereby applying pressure to the shoulder joint. It is used by many wrestlers in the beginning of the match. It was used by Ed Lewis and Bruno Sammartino. George Steele used an elevated version of the Hammerlock.

==== Headscissors armbar ====
The wrestler wraps their legs around the opponent's head in a headscissors, facing towards the opponent, then grabs one of the opponent's arms and wrenches it backwards, causing pressure on the shoulder and elbow of the opponent. This can often be performed on a standing wrestler when preceded by a tilt-a-whirl, which was popularized by Gail Kim, who dubbed it the Flying Dragon.

=== Scissored armbar ===
Nicknamed the Stu-Lock, in honor of Stu Hart who used the move, the wrestler approaches a prone opponent from the side. The wrestler then "scissors" (clasps) the near arm of the opponent with one or both legs from a standing position and takes hold of the far arm of the opponent with both hands, forcing the opponent onto their side and placing stress on both shoulder joints, as well as making it harder for the opponent to breathe. It can cause serious injury to the opponent if held for long. Often confused with the octopus hold, it was popularized by Perry Saturn as the Rings of Saturn.

=== Seated armbar ===
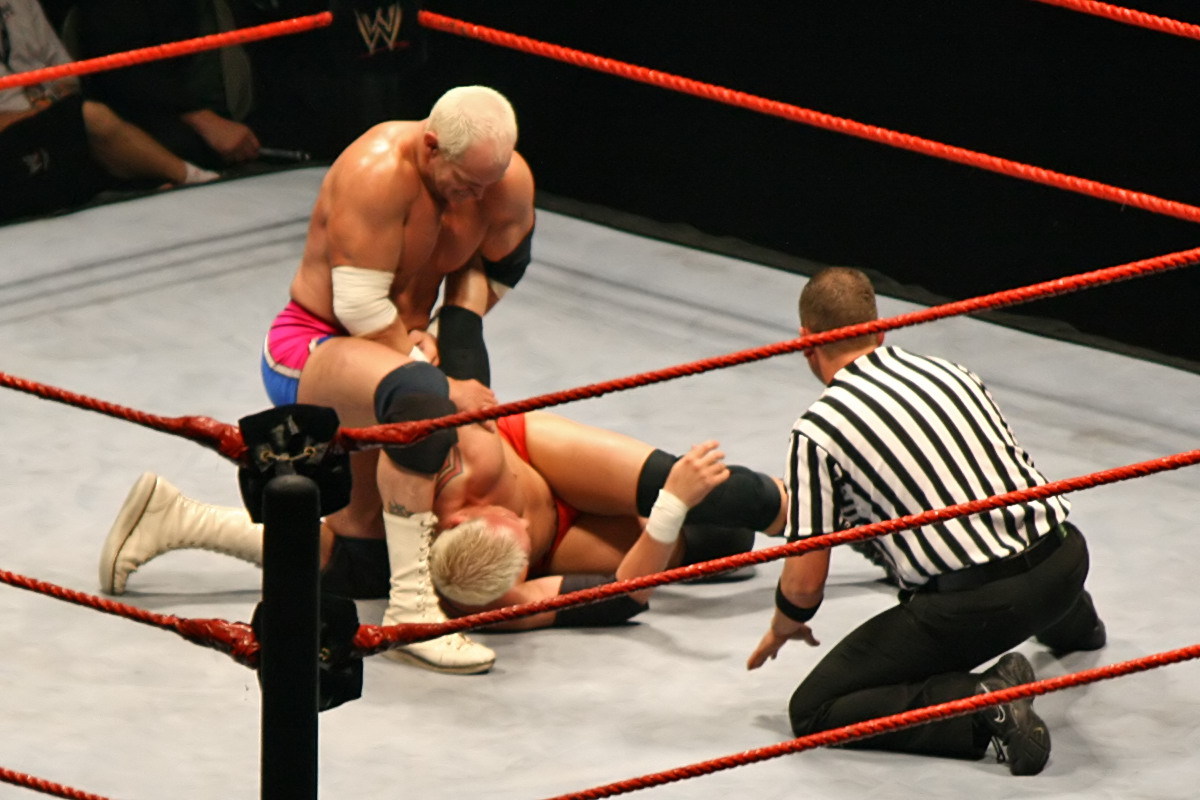
Hardcore Holly applying a seated armbar on Mr. Kennedy

Known as Ashi-gatame in Japan and a pumphandle armbar in America. The wrestler sits facing away on either side of an opponent who is lying prone on the mat, with the wrestler's legs scissoring one of the opponent's arms. The wrestler then grabs hold of the wrist of that arm, pulling it upwards, causing hyperextension of the shoulder and elbow. Yuji Nagata has used the move while rolling his eyes backwards called the Shirome (white eyes). Satoshi Kojima uses a slight variation where both of his legs are on the same side of the opponent's arm. He calls it the Koji MAX hold.

==== Short arm scissors ====
The opponent is on their back with the attacker sitting beside them and grabbing the nearest arm. The attacker bends the opponent's arm and reaches through with one of their own. The attacker places one of their legs across the wrist of the opponent and grabs their own ankle to lock the hold. The attacker pulls up with their arm while forcing the victim's wrist down with their leg and applies pressure to the victim's elbow. Known in combat sport as the "bicep slicer".

==== Tiger feint crucifix armbar ====
The opponent begins supine, lying with their back on the bottom or second rope and facing into the ring. The wrestler runs towards the opponent and jumps through the second and top rope while holding on to the ropes, then swings around and grapevines the opponent's arms, applying a crucifix armbar.

==== Barely legal ====
From behind a seated opponent, the wrestler grabs one of the opponent's elbows and pulls it up and backward. The wrestler then bends the wrist and forces the open palm of the opponent's hand into their chest, putting pressure on the wrist. The maneuver's invention is credited to Barry Darsow, who was the person who gave it its name.

==== Chickenwing ====
The wrestler grabs their opponent's arm, pulling it around behind the opponent's back. This stretches the pectorals and shoulder joint and immobilizes the arm. This is a legitimate controlling or debilitating hold and is commonly used by police officers in the United States to subdue uncooperative persons for arrest. This hold is used by Frankie Kazarian.

===== Bridging chickenwing =====
Also known as a bridging wrist lock. The wrestler approaches a prone opponent, lying down on their stomach. The wrestler grabs either of the opponent's arms and pulls it to their back (resulting the arm being bent behind the opponent's back). The wrestler then rolls or flips forward into a bridge, applying pressure on the wrist and elbow.

===== Crossface chickenwing =====
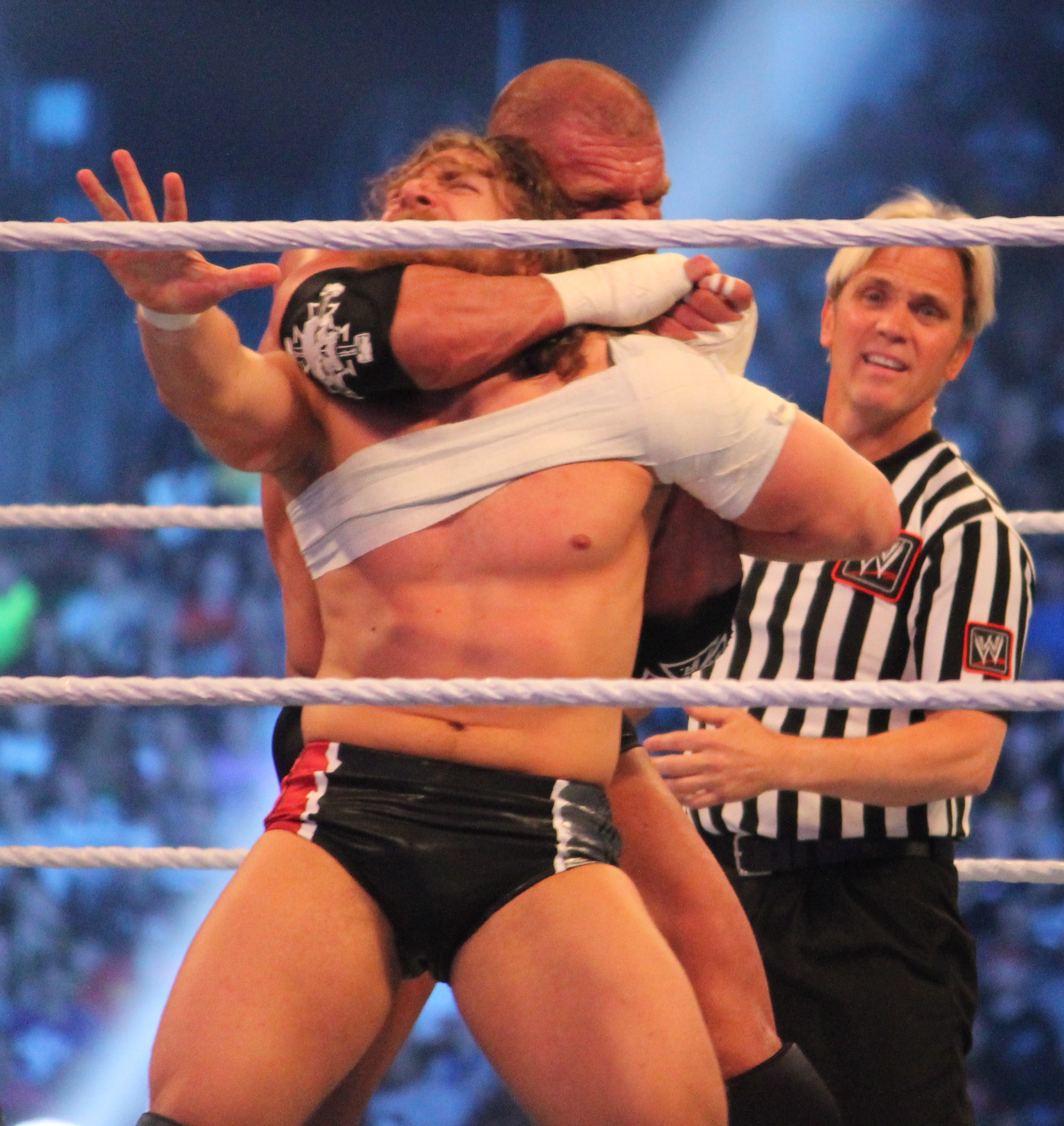
Triple H traps Daniel Bryan in a crossface chickenwing

In this variation, the wrestler first performs the chickenwing to one of the opponent's arms, then takes their other arm, wraps it around the opponent's neck, and then either pulls the opponent's head to the side, which puts pressure on the neck and shoulders, or leaves the arm tucked under the chin as in a one-armed sleeper hold. Depending on the wrestler's preference, they may clasp their hands together to secure the hold, as Triple H shows in the adjacent picture. In many cases, the wrestler will drop to the mat and lock the opponent in a bodyscissor lock to make escape even more difficult. The crossface chickenwing is mostly identified with Bob Backlund, who used the hold as a finishing maneuver following his comeback to the WWF in the mid-1990s and won his second world championship using the hold. Backlund's version of the hold incorporates the bodyscissors portion. former NXT Rookie and WWE superstar Darren Young used this move right before he was released from the WWE after being trained by Bob Backlund. Bryan Danielson used the move early in his career. Marty Scurll uses it as finishing move. Asuka also uses the bodyscissors variation as a finisher dubbed the Asuka Lock. Sean Waltman and Norman Smiley used both the standing and bodyscissors versions of this move as finishers dubbed the Buzzkiller and Norman's Conquest respectively. A version of this move has also been performed to a seated opponent.

==== Double chickenwing ====
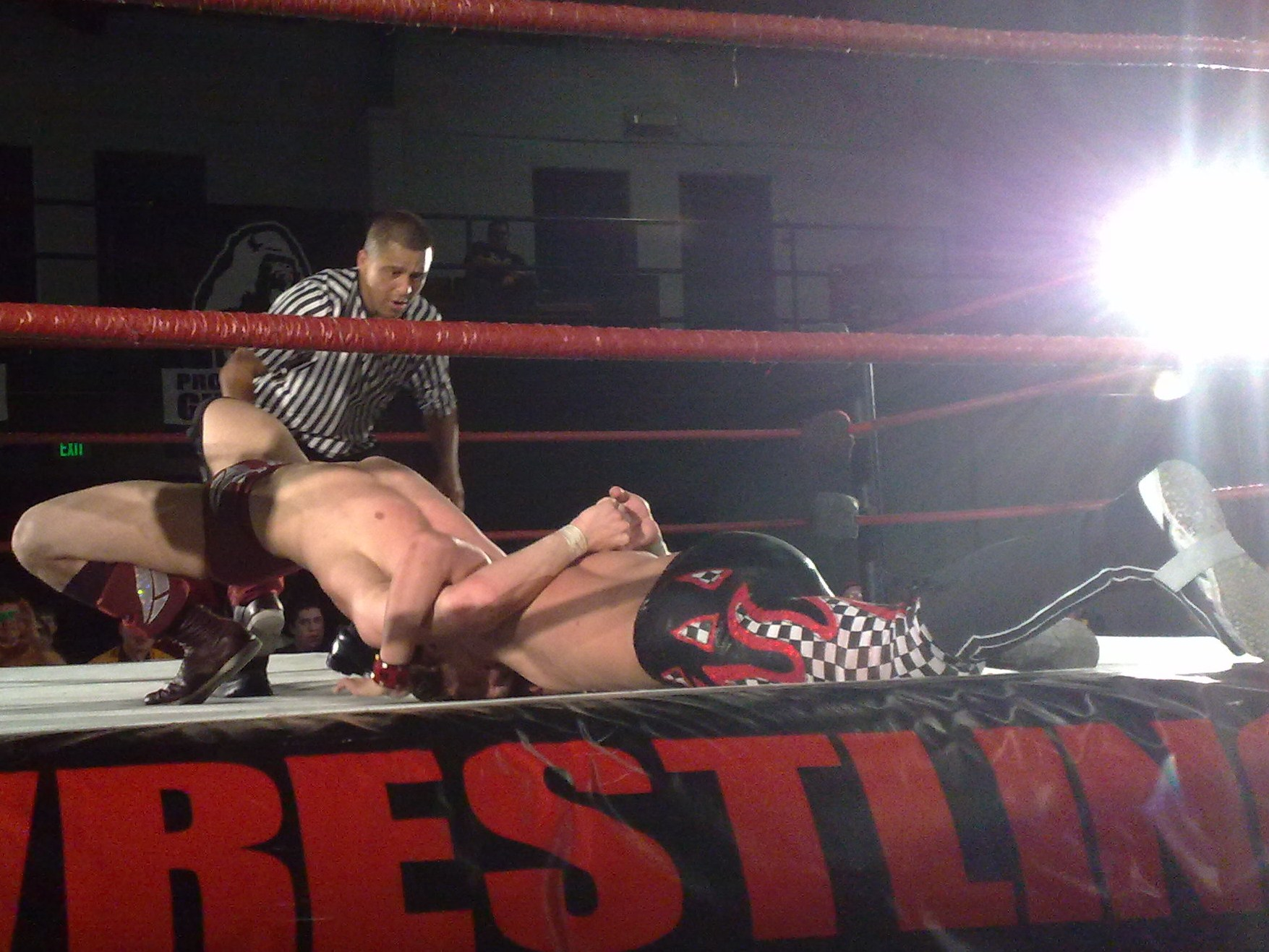
Bryan Danielson applying his cattle mutilation finishing hold, a bridging grounded double chickenwing

This hold sees the wrestler standing behind the opponent facing the same direction, and then hooking both the opponent's arms under their armpits. The move is known for being used for the tiger suplex.

===== Bridging double chickenwing =====
Also referred to as a "bridging grounded double chickenwing" or Cattle Mutilation. The wrestler stands over a prone opponent's back and tucks the opponent's arms under their armpits. From this point, the wrestler then rolls or flips into a bridge, pulling the opponent's arms and applying pressure on them. The move origin is unknown, as many wrestlers used between the 80s and in the early 1990s. A version where the opponent sits in a seated position (with older origins) was first called Cattle Mutilation by Poison Sawada Julie, a name that has also been applied to the grounded version made famous by Bryan Danielson. Asuka also uses this variation.

===== Elevated double chickenwing =====
This variation of the double chickenwing sees the wrestler wrenching the opponent up while still holding them in the double chickenwing. The hold is usually transitioned into a chickenwing facebuster. The Elevated double chickenwing was famously used by Ricky Steamboat in his best 2 out of 3 falls match with Ric Flair. Its facebuster version was later made popular by Beth Phoenix, calling the move the Glam Slam. Former Impact wrestler Jazz also used this move dubbed the Bitch Clamp.

===== Scorpion cross lock =====
Also known as an inverted sharpshooter combined with a double chickenwing, this hold sets up the same as the sharpshooter, with the opponent supine on the mat with the applying wrestler stepping between the opponent's legs with their right leg and wrapping the opponent's legs at shin level around that leg. However, instead of stepping over the opponent to flip them, the applying wrestler flips the opponent over from left-to-right, keeping the opponent in front of them. The applying wrestler then leans over the opponent and grabs their arms, applying a double chicken wing to the opponent. The applying wrestler then squats back, lifting the opponent's torso into the air. The move was used by Bull Nakano and formerly used by the former SmackDown general manager Paige as the PTO.

==== Kimura lock ====
This technique is also known as a single chickenwing hammerlock or a double wrist lock. A judo submission named the reverse (gyaku) ude-garami, and popularly named and innovated by Masahiko Kimura, after he broke Hélio Gracie's arm with it. It is a commonly used submission in judo, BJJ and MMA. The move is performed when a wrestler grasps the opponent's left wrist with their right hand. The wrestler then places their left arm over and around the opponent's arm while grasping their own wrist. This move is ambidextrous and can be performed either from a standing position, or a grounded position where the attacker applies a variation of body scissors. This move was popularized in WWE by Brock Lesnar, where he would use it often to (kayfabe) break his opponent's arm. Kushida also uses the hold as the Hoverboard Lock.

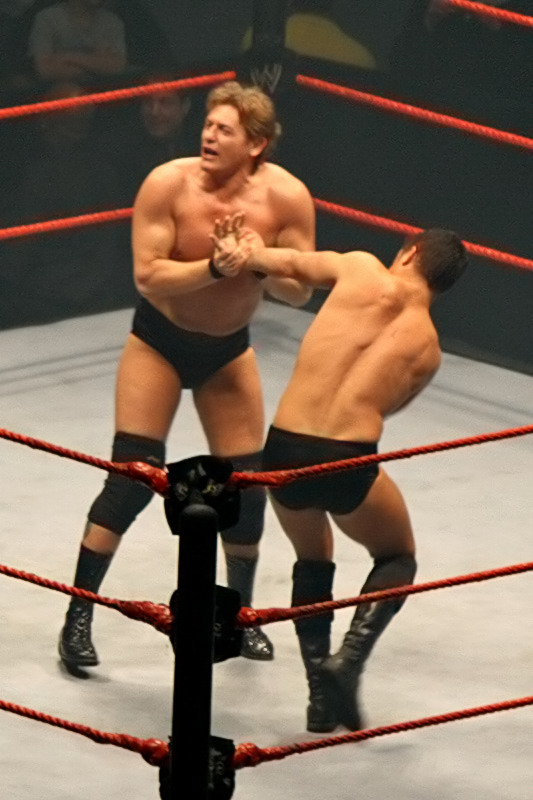
William Regal immobilizes Cody Rhodes with a standing wrist lock

==== Wrist lock ====
Sometimes preceded by an arm wrench, the wrestler grasps the opponent's hand and twists backwards, placing pressure on the wrist. While this can inflict pain on its own, it is most often used as a transition hold, leading into either a hammer lock, an elbow to the held arm, or kicks to the opponent's abdominal area. Another form of wrist lock, sometimes known as a figure four wrist lock, involves the wrestler (after applying the initial wrist lock with the left hand) threading their right arm through the gap the two arms provide, forming a 4, and providing leverage on the wrist lock.

=== Body locks ===
==== Bear hug ====
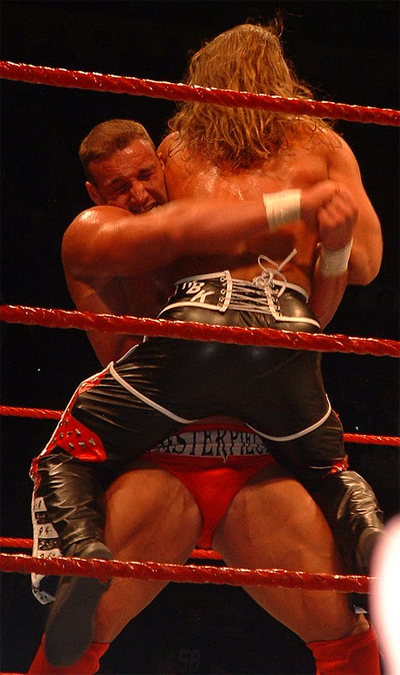
Chris Masters applying a bear hug on Shawn Michaels

A wrestler stands in front of an opponent and locks their hands around the opponent, squeezing them. Often the wrestler will shake their body from side to side in order to generate more pain around the ribs and spine. The move can be done while the opponent is standing upright or lifted off the ground, usually with their legs wrapped around the attacking wrestler's waist. Frequently used by powerhouse style wrestlers, this rather simple to apply hold is used by heels and faces alike. An inverted variation is also possible, which was commonly used by Big John Studd. In both versions, one or both of the opponent's arms can be pinned to their sides. George Hackenschmidt is known for innovating the move. This was also used as a finisher by Hulk Hogan early in his career called the Golden Squeeze in his WWF debut match against Ted DiBiase in 1979 and Bruno Sammartino who also used it as a finisher to win his first WWE Championship.

==== Side bear hug ====
The attacker stands to the side of an opponent and locks their hands around their torso. One or both of the arms can be pinned.

==== Waist lock ====
A wrestler stands behind the opponent and then wraps both of their arms around them in a reverse bear hug, sometimes clutching their hands together by the wrist for added pressure. This usually sets up a German suplex or a waistlock takedown.

==== Body scissors ====
A wrestler approaches a sitting opponent from in front, behind, or either side. The attacking wrestler then sits next to the opponent and wraps their legs around the opponent, crossing their ankles and then tightening their grip by squeezing together their thighs or straightening their legs to compress the opponent's torso. This hold is often used in conjunction with a hold applied to the head or the arms in order to restrain the opponent.

==== Body triangle ====
Body triangle or Figure-four body lock is achieved by first crossing the ankles, grasping the heel of one foot and pulling that foot into the opposite knee, this creates the signature “4”. The attacker can apply different submissions. It is usually done from back mount or closed guard. Some common submissions from this position are the triangle choke, armbar, and other types of armlocks and chokeholds.

==== Back and torso stretches ====
===== Abdominal stretch =====
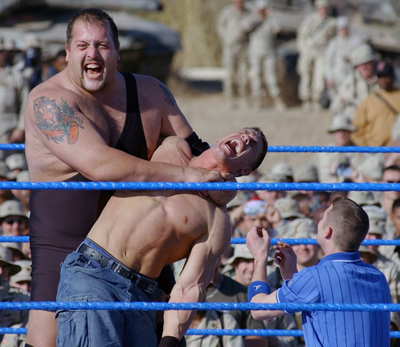
Big Show performing an abdominal stretch on John Cena in 2003

Also known as a "cobra twist", this hold begins with a wrestler facing their opponent's side. The wrestler first straddles one of the opponent's legs, then reaches over the opponent's near arm with the arm close to the opponent's back and locks it. Squatting and twisting to the side flexes the opponent's back and stretches their abdomen, which also means leaving their abs exposed and open to further holds, such as a claw to the victim's abs, or simply punching them. This move can also be applied to a seated opponent or rolling sideways while standing to ground them keeping the hold in place as well as possibly trying to score a pinfall if both the opponent's shoulders are touching the mat. The amateur wrestling analogue is the guillotine, also known as a "twister".

Another version of this move sees the wrestler, straddles one of the opponent's legs, then reaches over the opponent's near arm with the arm close to the opponent's back and places both hands against the opponent's neck and pushes against it applying additional pressure. This version is called the Abdominal neck wrench.

===== Boston crab =====
This typically starts with the opponent on their back, and the wrestler standing and facing them. The wrestler hooks each of the opponent's legs in one of their arms and then turns the opponent face-down, stepping over them in the process. The final position has the wrestler in a semi-sitting position and facing away from the opponent, with the opponent's back and legs bent back toward their face. Chris Jericho uses this move in a high angle version, calling it the Walls of Jericho. Lance Storm also performs this move with both versions, including the regular Boston crab and single-leg Boston crab. He usually sets it up from a single-leg takedown or a roll-through called the Calgary Crab. Samoa Joe also uses an inverted powerbomb as a setup into the Boston crab. Charlotte Flair uses this move to set up for the Figure Eight Leglock. An inverted variation is also possible, commonly used by Colt Cabana as the Billy Goat's Curse.

===== Bow and arrow hold =====
The wrestler kneels on the opponent's back with both knees, hooking the head with one arm and the legs with the other. They then roll back so that the opponent is suspended on their knees above them, facing up. The wrestler pulls down with both arms while pushing up with the knees to bend the opponent's back.

===== Gory Special =====
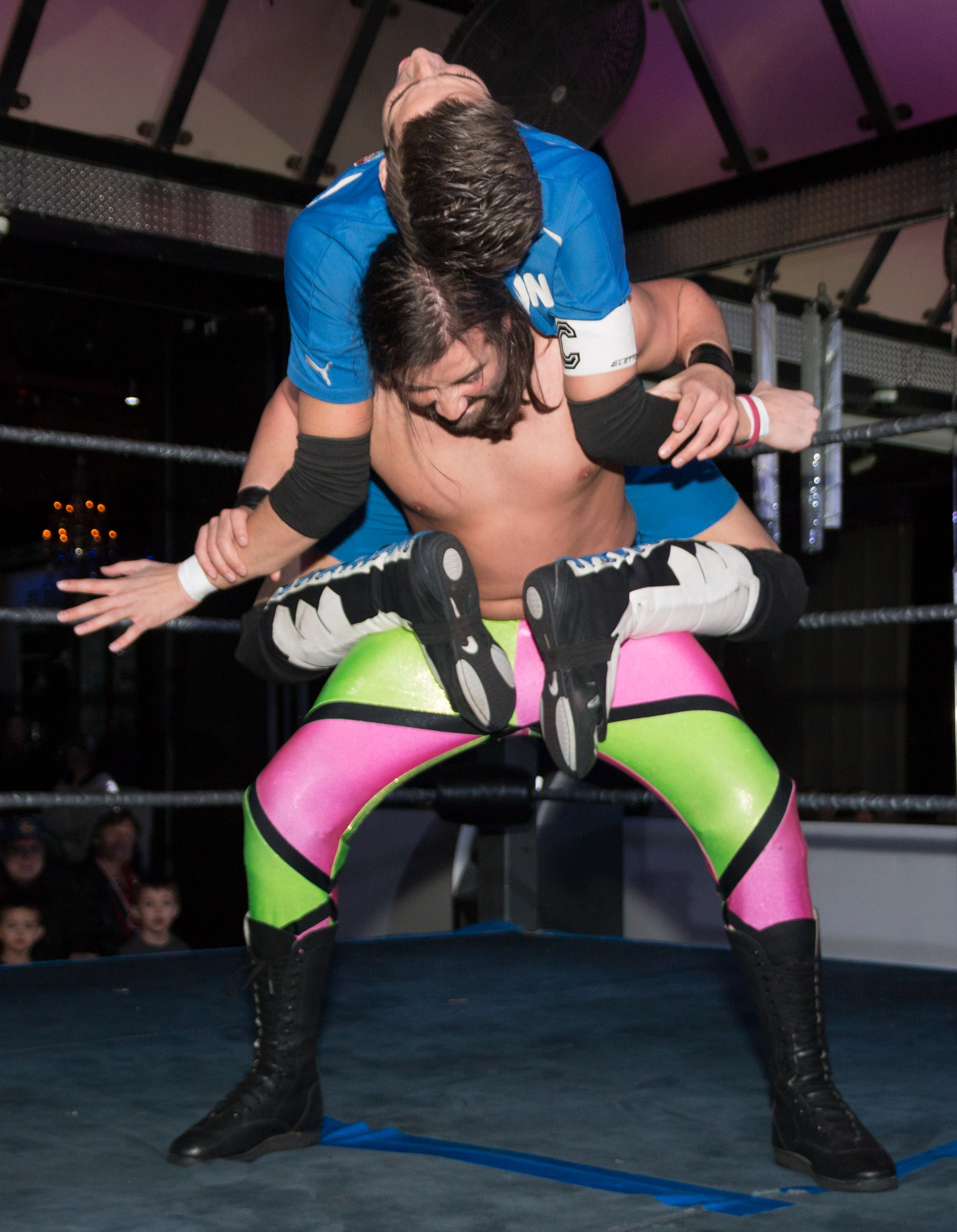
Robbie Reckless (bottom) locks Alessandro Del Bruno in a Gory special

The Gory Special is a back-to-back backbreaker submission hold. It was invented by Gory Guerrero in Mexico. The wrestler, while behind the opponent, facing in the opposing direction, hooks their arms under the opponent's. From this position, the wrestler lifts the opponent up, usually by bending. This move can be used as a submission hold or can be used for a neckbreaker slam, or a facebuster takedown.

===== La Nieblina =====
Also known as an over-rotated Delfin Clutch, the wrestler approaches face-up opponent then grabs and folds the opponent's left arm over their lower torso, their left leg over their left arm, their right arm over their left leg, and the right leg over the right arm and left leg at the point where the ankle and wrist are placed together. From here, the wrestler rolls the opponent face first onto the mat, with their legs and arms tied together, sandwiched between the mat. The wrestler then sits on top of their opponent using their own body weight to apply pressure with the option to grab and crank back on the right leg. This hold was innovated by Mr. Niebla and is best associated with Miliano Collection A.T. known as the Paradise Lock.

An inverted version of this move is possible with the opponent on their stomach, the wrestler grabs the opponent's right arm and places it on top of their back, grabs and stacks the right arm with their right leg, then puts the left arm on top of the right leg, and then finally immobilizes the other limbs by placing the left leg on top of the rest. Next, the wrestler turns their opponent over so that they are on their knees with all four of their limbs trapped underneath. The wrestler then sits on top of the opponent forcing them into a bridge and pressing down on their body.

===== Lotus lock =====
The wrestler grabs the opponent's arms and wraps their legs on the outside of them, so the wrestler's feet meet at the back of the neck of the opponent and exert a downward pressure, akin to applying a full nelson but by using the legs.

==== Octopus hold ====
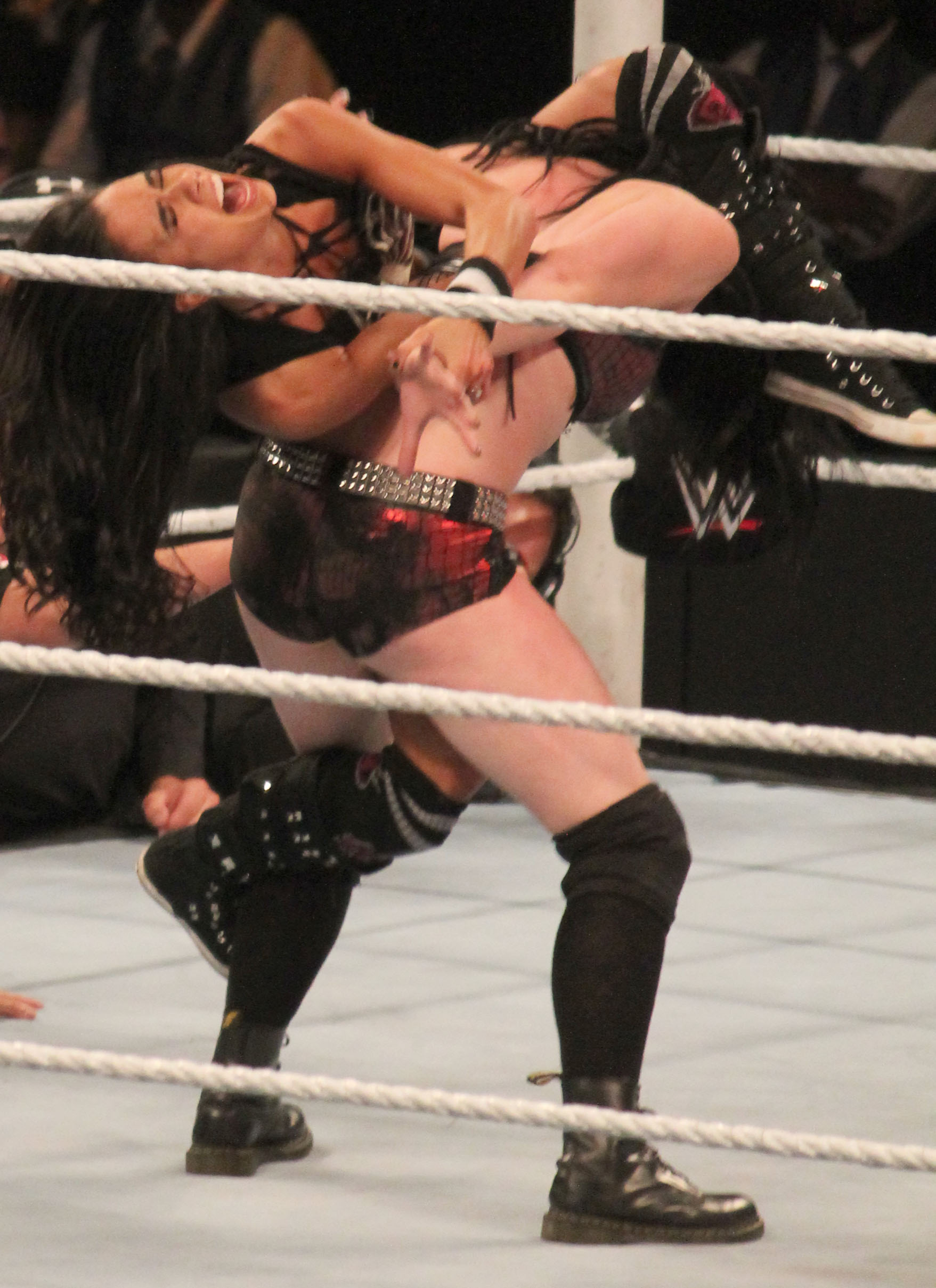
AJ Lee performing the Black Widow on Paige

Also known as an "Octopus stretch" and Manji-gatame (Japanese version), the wrestler stands behind the opponent and hooks a leg over the opponent's opposite leg. The wrestler then forces the opponent to one side, traps one of the opponent's arms with their own arm and drapes their free leg over the neck of the opponent, forcing it downward. This elevates the wrestler and places all the weight of the wrestler on the opponent. The wrestler has one arm free, which can be used for balance. It was invented by Antonio Inoki. AJ Lee and Katsuyori Shibata used this move as their finisher, with the former calling it the Black Widow. Zack Sabre Jr., Jonathan Gresham and Akira Tozawa uses it as submission finishers.

===== Rocking chair =====
Known as "La mecedora" (Spanish for Rocking chair) or "La campana" (The bell) in Mexico. The opponent is face down on the mat, with the attacker bending both of their legs up and tucking their ankles against their armpits. The attacker then reaches down and grabs both of the opponent's arms before sitting down, "rocking" back and forth and stretching the opponent's back.

===== Mexican Surfboard =====
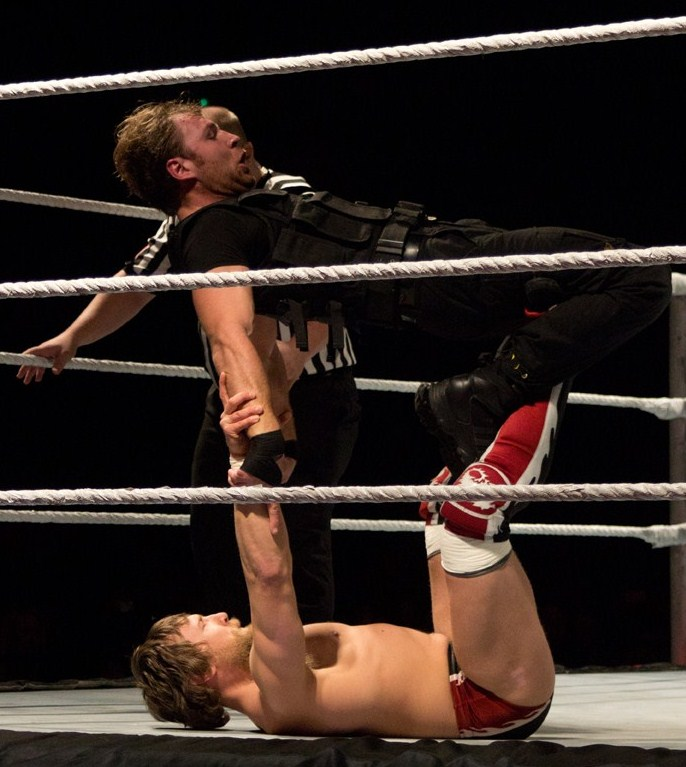
Daniel Bryan (bottom) performing a Mexican surfboard on Dean Ambrose

Also known as a "Romero special". The Mexican surfboard hold first sees a wrestler stand behind a fallen opponent, who is lying stomach down on the floor. The wrestler places one foot down just above each of the opponent's knees and bends their legs up, hooking them around their own knees; at this point the wrestler grasps both of their opponent's wrists (usually slapping the opponent's back in an attempt to bring the arms in reach), and can either do three things: Remain standing, fall into a seated position, or fall backwards while compressing the opponent's shoulder blades and lifting them off the ground. This can see the wrestler fall to a seated position or go onto their back, lifting the opponent skyward, which will increase pressure on the opponent but put the wrestler in risk of pinning their own shoulders to the mat. It is mostly performed by Jushin Thunder Liger, Natalya Neidhart and Daniel Bryan as a signature and by Rito Romero as a finisher.

====== Cross-armed surfboard ======
This version of a surfboard sees a standing or kneeling wrestler take hold of both of a kneeling or seated opponent's wrists and cross their arms over, applying pressure to both the opponent's arms and shoulders. Sometimes the wrestler may place their foot or knee on the opponent's upper back in order to exert even more pressure.

====== Seated surfboard ======
Another version of a surfboard, which is known as a "seated surfboard stretch" but referred to as a "modified surfboard stretch". Most often applied by a standing wrestler against a prone opponent, but may also be applied by a seated wrestler or against a seated or kneeling opponent, sees the wrestler grasp both of their opponent's wrists while placing their foot or knee on the opponent's upper back, pulling back on the arms to compress the opponent's shoulder blades. In lucha libre, the variation performed against a kneeling opponent is called La Cavernaria, after Cavernario Galindo.

====== Pin-up Strong ======
In this Modified double wrist lock surfboard, The wrestler first takes the opponent's legs then, bends them at the knees, and crosses them, placing one ankle in the other leg's knee-pit before then turning around so that they are facing away from the opponent and places one of their feet into the triangle created by the opponent's crossed legs. The wrestler then places the opponent's free ankle under their knee-pit. The wrestling then rolls to the ground, on onto their back, forcing the opponent over on the back. The wrestling then grabs both of the opponent's wrist, lays straight on their back and pulls the opponent's arms while lifting their own legs upwards to put pressure on the opponent's legs simultaneously. This move was used by the Divas of Doom (chiefly Natalya) as a signature.

=== Backbreaker ===
==== Backbreaker hold ====
This basic backbreaker submission involves the wrestler laying the opponent's back across one knee, then, while placing one hand on the opponent's chin and the other on their knee, the wrestler pushes down to bend the opponent around their knee. This move is usually performed at the end of a pendulum backbreaker, a move which sees a wrestler drop an opponent down on the wrestler's knee, thus weakening the back before the hold is applied, as well as setting the opponent in a proper position.

==== Argentine backbreaker rack ====
Innovated by Antonino Rocca, this submission hold, also known as a Torture Rack or simply a rack, sees the attacking wrestler carrying the opponent face-up across their own shoulders, before hooking the opponent's head with one hand and a leg with the other to then pull down on both ends to hyperextend the opponent's back and force a submission. Wrestler Lex Luger was famous for using it as a finisher. Hercules also used this as a finisher move as well.

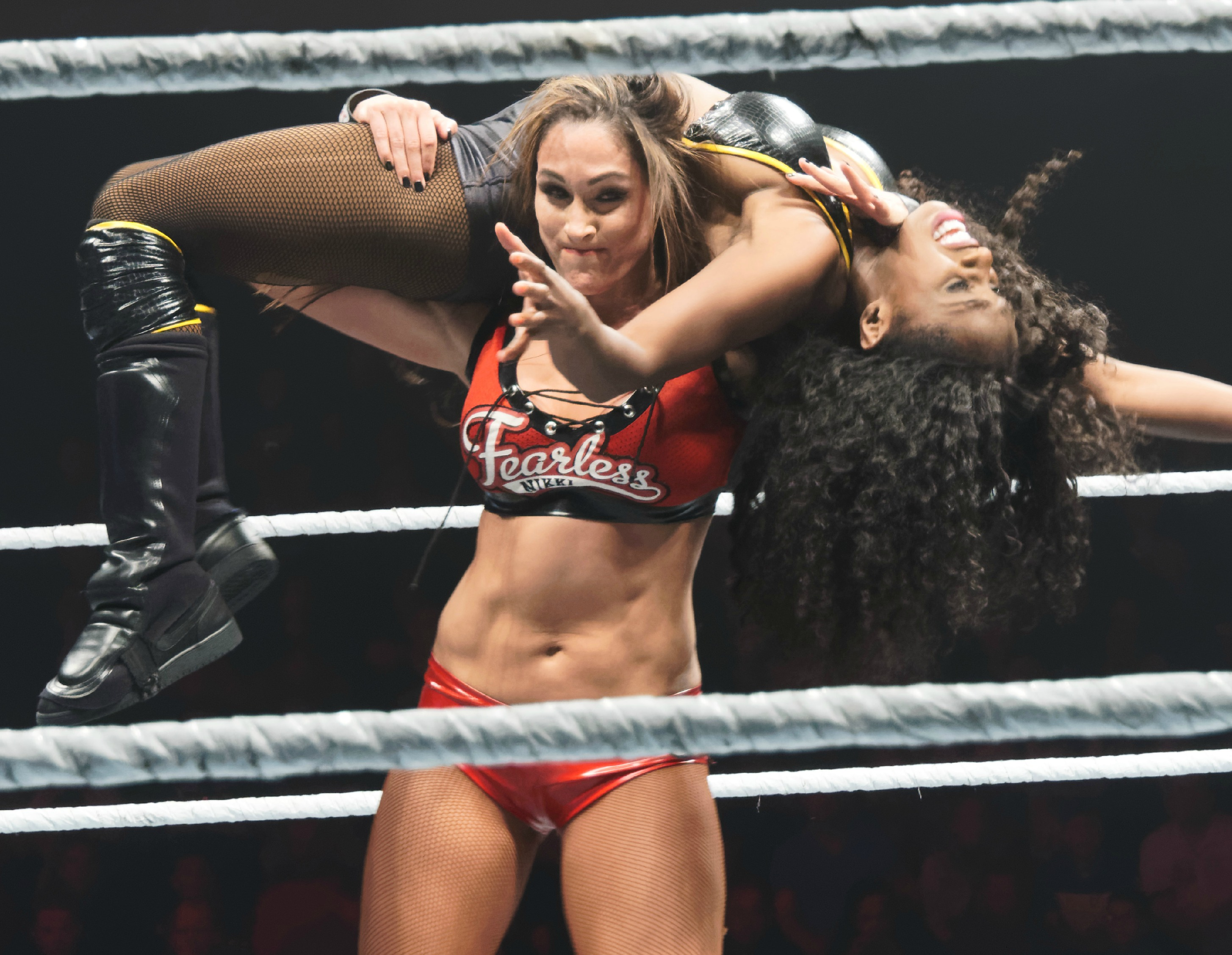
Nikki Bella holds the Rack Attack (Argentine backbreaker rack) on Naomi.

A backbreaker drop variation of this submission move sees the attacking wrestler first hold an opponent up for the Argentine backbreaker rack before dropping to the mat in a sitting or kneeling position, thus flexing the opponent's back with the impact of the drop. Another version sees the wrestler hold their opponent in the Argentine backbreaker rack before dropping into a sitting or kneeling position while simultaneously throwing the opponent off their shoulders, causing the opponent to roll in midair and fall to the mat in a face-down position. Nikki Bella has used both variations as a finisher in WWE.

A variation of the Argentine backbreaker rack, known as the La Reinera, sees the opponent held across the wrestler's upper back rather than their shoulders/neck. Often set up by a tilt-a-whirl, the opponent ends up suspended with one arm hooked behind and both legs hooked by the wrestler's other arm. Rolando Vera was credited with inventing the move.

Another Argentine backbreaker rack variation called the La Atlántida, favored by Mexican luchador Atlantis, sees the attacking wrestler holding the opponent across the shoulders and behind the head in a side-lying position facing towards the rear, then pulling down on the head and one leg to laterally bending the opponent.

A variation of the La Atlántida, sometimes known as the "Accordion Rack", sees the opponent held similarly in a side-lying position facing the rear across the attacking wrestler's shoulders, but with the opponent's lower back curvature directly behind the wrestler's head, and instead of pulling downwards the wrestler will chest fly forward to bend the opponent, sometimes to the point that the opponent's heel touches the head. However, this move is mainly limited to opponents with great flexibility. It was utilized by wrestlers like Awesome Kong.

==== Canadian backbreaker rack ====
Also known technically as the overhead gutwrench backbreaker rack or Sammartino backbreaker this sees an attacking wrestler first lift an opponent up so the opponent's back is resting on the wrestler's shoulder, with the opponent's head pointing in the direction that the wrestler is facing. The wrestler then links their arms around the face-up opponent's torso and presses down, squeezing the opponent's spine against the wrestler's shoulder. Hulk Hogan used this hold as a finisher earlier in career after the Bearhug and before his Atomic Leg Drop. A common variant of this hold has the attacking wrestler also apply a double underhook before or after lifting the opponent. This was used by Colt Cabana as the Colt .45. The double underhook variant is often seen when the hold is used to transition to another maneuver, such as a backbreaker drop or inverted powerbomb. Bruno Sammartino famously used this move on his opponents. Will Ospreay used the double underhook to spin his opponent into a neckbreaker called the Stormbreaker.

=== Leglocks ===
==== Toehold ====
Also known as Ashi-Dori-Garami in Judo, the wrestler sees the opponent in a crouching position and then takes hold of their foot and cranks it sideways, putting pressure on the ankle and achilles tendon. This move was innovated by Frank Gotch. A common type of toe hold is the figure-four toe hold, where a figure-four hold is used to hold the opponent's foot. This type of toe hold is performed by holding the foot by the toes with one hand and putting the other hand under the opponent's achilles tendon and grabbing the wrist. By controlling the opponent's body and using the hands to plantar flex the foot either straight or slightly sideways, hence putting considerable torque on the ankle. A standing version of this move also exists which was innovated by Ken Shamrock, this is known as an Ankle Lock. Both of these maneuvers are also used in other various martial arts such as Judo, Submission Wrestling, and Brazilian Jiu-Jitsu.

==== Ankle lock ====
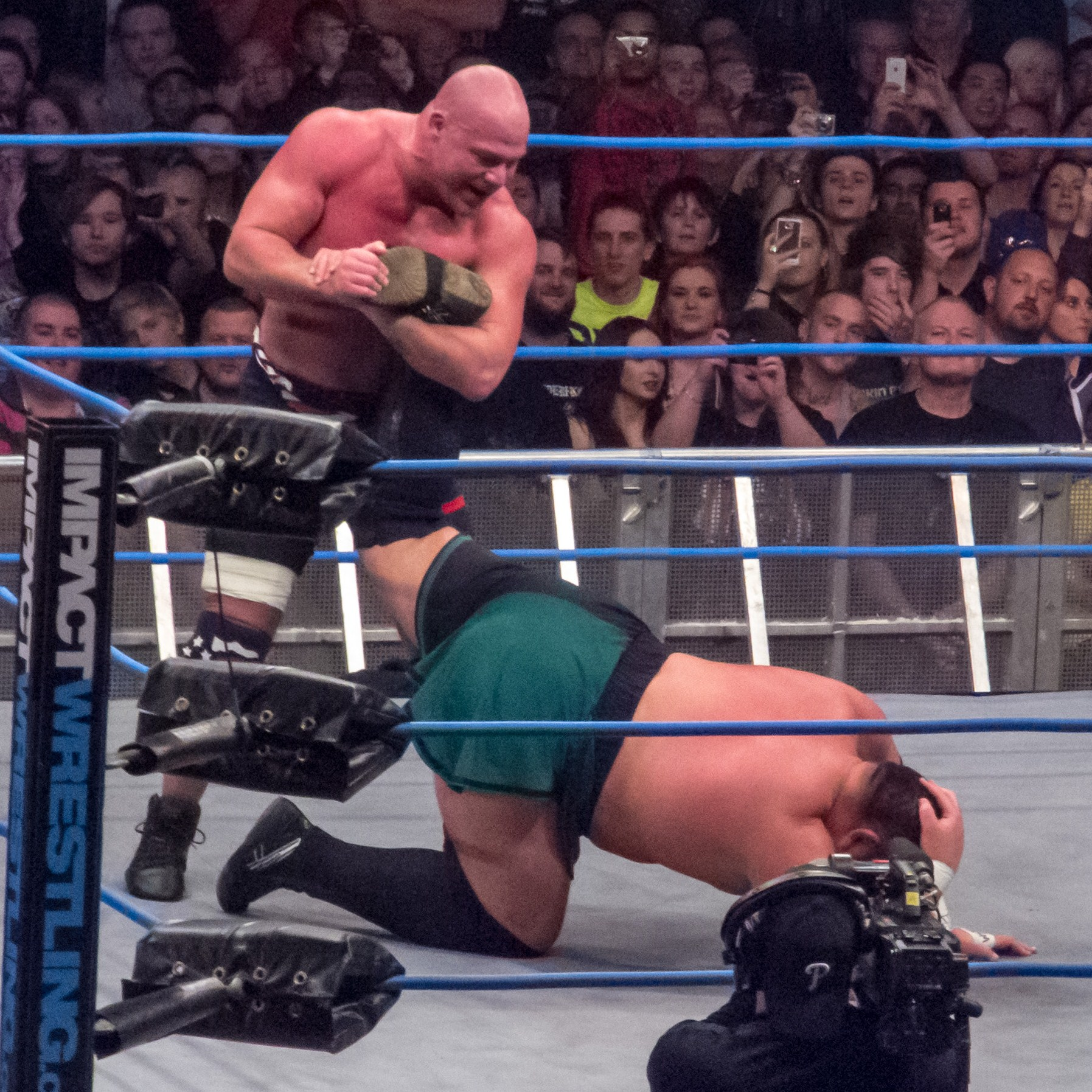
Kurt Angle applying ankle lock on Samoa Joe

In this toe hold maneuver, a wrestler will grab the opponent's foot and lift their leg off the ground. With one hand, the wrestler will grab either the toes or the outside of the foot, then with the other wrap the ankle to create a "hole" for the joint. A grapevine variation sees the wrestler applying the ankle lock hold and then falling to the mat and scissoring the leg of the opponent. This stops the opponent from rolling out of the move and makes it harder for them to crawl to the ropes, but lessens the pressure that can be applied. The move can be executed from a kneeling position or a standing position, depending on the wrestler's preference. Ken Shamrock was the first to popularize the use of this move in professional wrestling, doing his from a kneeling position. Years later, Kurt Angle adopted the ankle lock as his finisher, but would often do it from a standing position. This is also performed by Jake Hager and Chad Gable, the former calling the move the Patriot Lock during his tenure in WWE as the "Real American" Jack Swagger.

==== Banana Split ====
The Banana Split is a flexibility-based grappling submission, derived from Brazilian Jiu-Jitsu and MMA, that focuses on separating the opponent's legs and stretching the soft tissues of the groin and hips. It's usually performed from a position called the Truck position, or Truck for short, a control position that targets the opponent’s lower body, specifically the hips and legs and starts with the attacker attempting to take the opponent's back, often from the turtle position or a scramble. The attacker gets to the Truck to secure the opponent's far-side leg (the one furthest from their head) by looping their own leg through and locking it down, often with a "lockdown" style entanglement around their thigh or shin. The attacker grabs the near-side leg (the one closest to their head) with a hand grip, often a Gable grip or similar grip, just above the knee or around the calf/ankle and rolls backward into their back and forcing the opponent onto theirs. The attacker then pulls the near leg back towards the opponent's head while simultaneously, using their body and leg entanglement to push the far leg away and stretch it out. Maintaining the hold, attacker's body will be perpendicular to the opponent with their own legs stretched out, their legs control the far leg, and their arms control the near leg. This coordinated opposing force creates intense pressure and stretching on the opponent's hips and groin ligaments, forcing them to tap out. English professional wrestler Zack Sabre Jr. uses a modified version as a finisher called Orienteering With Napalm Death in which he places the opponent near leg behind his head on cranks it inward, creating more pressure and often transitions into this move from a Calf Slicer.

Unlike most leg locks that target a single joint, this move targets specifically targets the soft tissues of the groin, hips, and lower back by forcing an extreme split. Less flexible opponents will tap much faster, while highly flexible opponents may be able to withstand it longer, sometimes forcing the attacker to transition to another submission like the Twister or Calf Slicer, which are also available from the Truck. While legal and occasionally seen in MMA (when Zabit Magomedsharipov or Aljamain Sterling have executed it), it is less common than chokeholds or arm locks. It is, however, more popular in submission grappling and is often associated with the grappling system of 10th Planet Jiu-Jitsu, which was created by Eddie Bravo. Bravo is credited with popularizing and systematizing the move within the context of No-Gi Brazilian Jiu-Jitsu and MMA, often using it as a gateway submission from his signature "Electric Chair" position, which itself is often entered from the "Lockdown" half guard position. However, moves similar to the Banana Split, particularly the one used in amateur/folkstyle wrestling, are also often referred to as a "crotch ripper" or are closely related to the "Spladle" or a variation of a leg ride/pin. These types of painful leg and hip stretches have likely been utilized in various forms of grappling and catch wrestling for many years, so definitively naming a single original inventor is difficult outside of the context of 10th Planet Jiu-Jitsu. In the modern context of submission grappling, Bravo is the most widely recognized figure for coining the name and incorporating the Banana Split into a structured system.

Heel hook

A heel hook is a leg lock affecting multiple joints, and is applied by transversely twisting the foot either medially or laterally. There are several variations of heel hooks, with the most typical being performed by placing the legs around a leg of an opponent and holding the opponent's foot in the armpit on the same side. The legs are used to control the movement of the opponent's body while the opponent's foot is twisted by holding the heel with the forearm and using the whole body to generate a twisting motion, hence creating severe medial torque on the ankle. A similar heel hook can be performed by holding the opponent's foot in the opposite armpit and twisting it laterally; a move which is referred to as an inverted, reverse or inside heel hook. This was Michelle McCool's submission finisher.

==== Cloverleaf ====
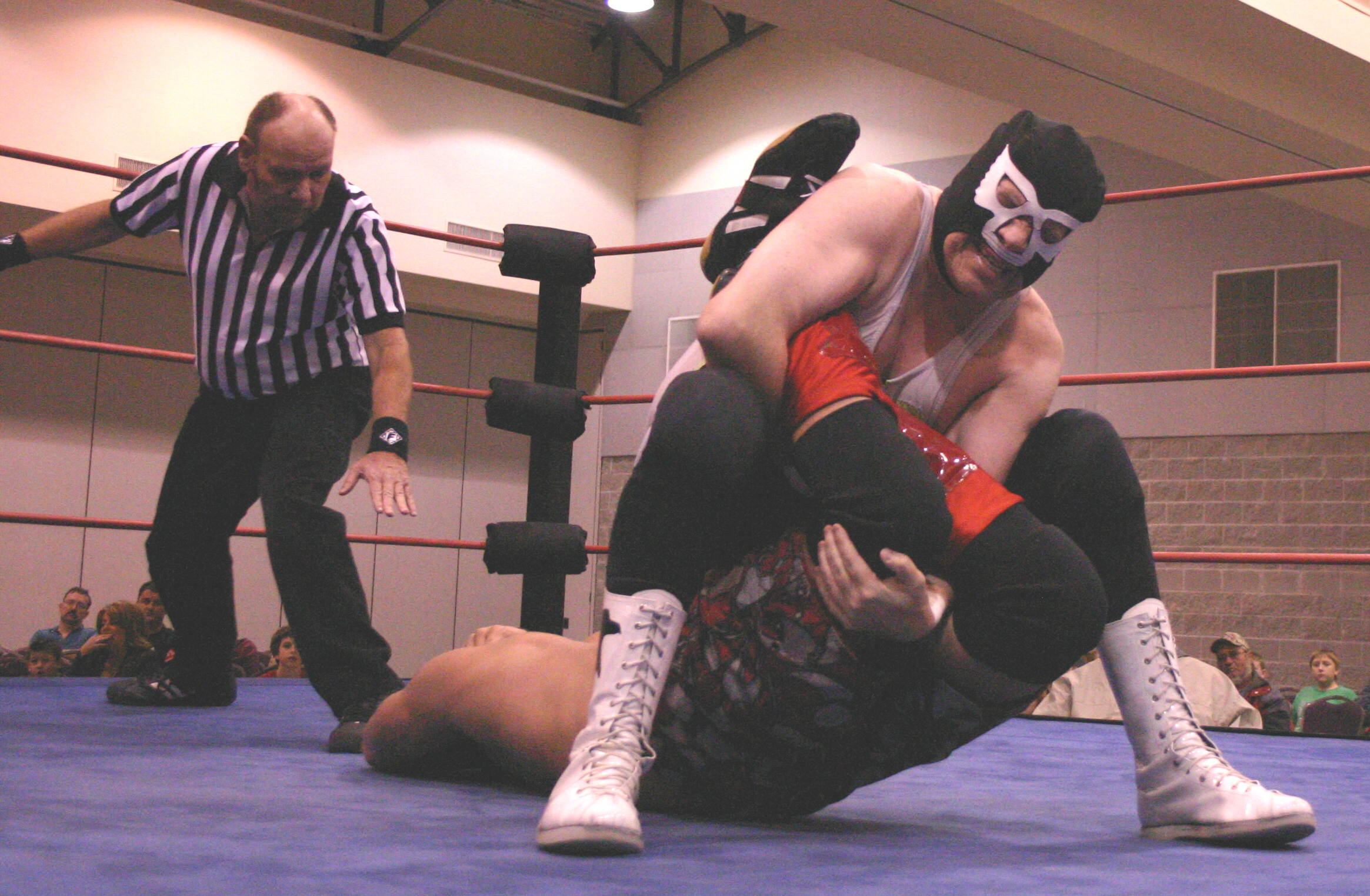
Application of the cloverleaf hold by The Nighthawk

Also popularly known as a "Texas Cloverleaf", the wrestler stands at the feet of the supine opponent, grabs the opponent's legs, and lifts them up. The wrestler then bends one leg so that the shin is behind the knee of the straight leg and places the ankle of the straight leg in their armpit. With the same arm, they reach around the ankle and through the opening formed by the legs and lock their hands together. The wrestler then steps over their opponent, turning the opponent over as in a sharpshooter and Boston crab and proceeds to squat and lean back. The hold compresses the legs, flexes the spine, and stretches the abdomen. The move was invented by Dory Funk, Jr. and popularized by Dean Malenko. A variation of the cloverleaf performed by Eddie Guerrero saw the wrestler perform the maneuver from a standing position, which enabled him to pull the opponent's legs up high enough to where he could add pressure to the hold by sticking one of his knees into the other wrestler's back. Guerrero referred to the move as the Lasso from El Paso, making reference to his hometown of El Paso, TX. Sheamus and JD McDonagh also use this move.

===== Cloverleaf with armlock =====
An armlock variation of the cloverleaf that is similar to a single leg Boston crab with armlock. This hold begins with an opponent lying face up on the mat. The attacking wrestler then seizes one of their arms and proceeds to walk over the opponent while continuing to hold the arm, forcing the opponent to turn over onto their stomach. The wrestler then kneels down on the opponent's back, locking the opponent's arm behind their knee in the process. The wrestler then reaches over and bends one leg so that the shin is behind the knee of the straight leg and places the ankle of the straight leg in their armpit. With the same arm, the wrestler reaches around the ankle and through the opening formed by the legs and locks their hands together as in a cloverleaf. The wrestler then pulls back so as to stretch the legs, back, and neck of the opponent while keeping the arm trapped.

===== Inverted cloverleaf =====
In this variation of a cloverleaf instead of turning around when turning the opponent over, the wrestler faces the same direction as the opponent to squat and lean forward to apply more pressure to the legs, spine, and abdomen. Also known as the Gorilla Clutch, named for Shuji Kondo's King Kong-themed signature move names. A body scissors version exists as well. Rhea Ripley uses a standing version of this maneuver called the Prism Lock.

===== Leglock cloverleaf =====
This variation of the cloverleaf sees the wrestler, after crossing one of the opponent's legs over the other in a figure four shape, lock the over leg behind their near knee before placing the straight leg under their armpit and turning over. The wrestler proceeds to lean back, pulling on the leg under the armpit. This keeps the over leg, now under, locked while putting pressure on the leg and stretching the legs and back. This variation is also used by Tyler Breeze as the Figure Four Sharpshooter, and by T. J. Perkins, who calls it the Figure Four Deathlock.

===== Rivera cloverleaf =====
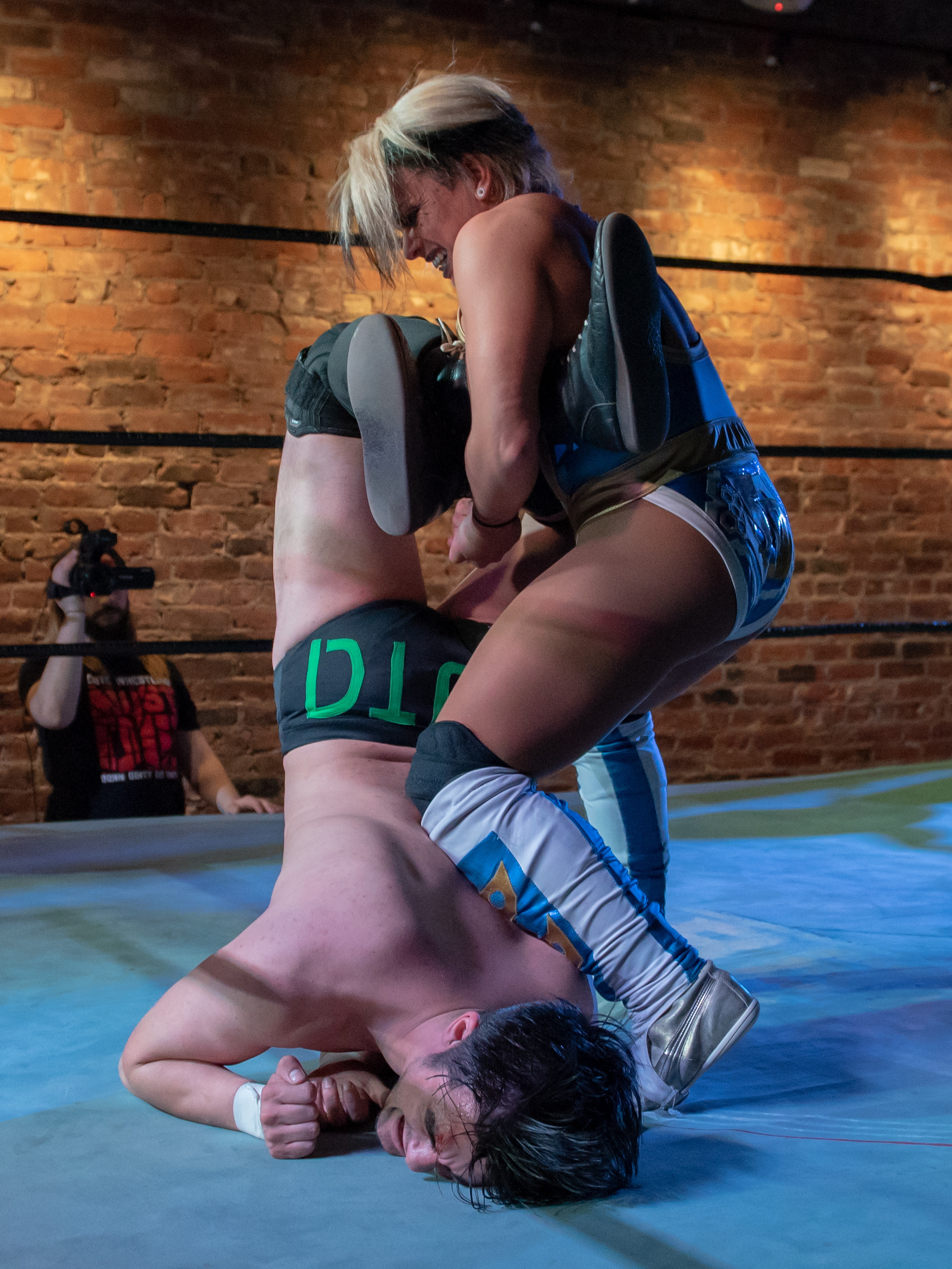
Solo Darling places her opponent Wheeler Yuta in a Rivera cloverleaf during a match in 2019

Invented by Chris Hero, this variation of the cloverleaf sees the wrestler hook the legs like a cloverleaf, but then weaves their hands through to clasp their other hand and also hooks the ankle sticking out with one leg (left or right) into their kneepit.

==== Cross kneelock ====
Also called a straight legbar or kneebar, it is performed similarly to an armbar by holding the opponent's leg in between the legs and arms so the opponent's kneecap points towards the body. The wrestler pushes the hips forward, the opponent's leg is straightened, and further leveraging hyper-extends the opponent's knee. Commonly used as a counter to an attack from behind. The wrestler flips forward down on to their back, placing their legs around one of the legs of the opponent on the way down, and thus using their momentum to drop the opponent forward down to the mat. The move can be also applied by running towards the opponent and then performing the flip when next to them. This move is currently being used by NXT superstar Noam Dar calling it the Superkneebar 11, which was formerly known as the Champagne Superkneebar.

==== Calf crusher ====
Also known as a calf slicer or leg slicer, the calf crusher is a Compression lock that involves pressing the calf and/or thigh muscle into one of the bones in the leg. Similarly to the biceps slicer, a calf crusher can be applied by inserting an arm or leg in the backside of the knee and flexing the opponent's leg to apply pressure to the muscles surrounding the fulcrum. Generally, the direction of the shin in the leg acting as a fulcrum will determine where the larger part of the pressure will go. Such calf crushers can be used as effective leglocks to the knee through a separating and elongating motion. Similarly to the Bicep slicer, the calf slicer is listed as a banned technique in the lower levels of some major Brazilian jiu-jitsu competitions. Wrestler AJ Styles uses this as a submission finisher move, calling it the Calf Killer in New Japan Pro-Wrestling and Impact Wrestling and the Calf Crusher in WWE.

==== Damascus head and leglock ====
The wrestler forces the opponent to the ground and opens up the opponent's legs, stepping in with both legs. The wrestler then wraps their legs around the head of the opponent and crosses the opponent's legs, applying pressure on them with their hands. The wrestler next turns 180 degrees and leans back. This hold applies pressure on the opponent's temples and calves and compresses the spine.

==== Figure-four leglock ====
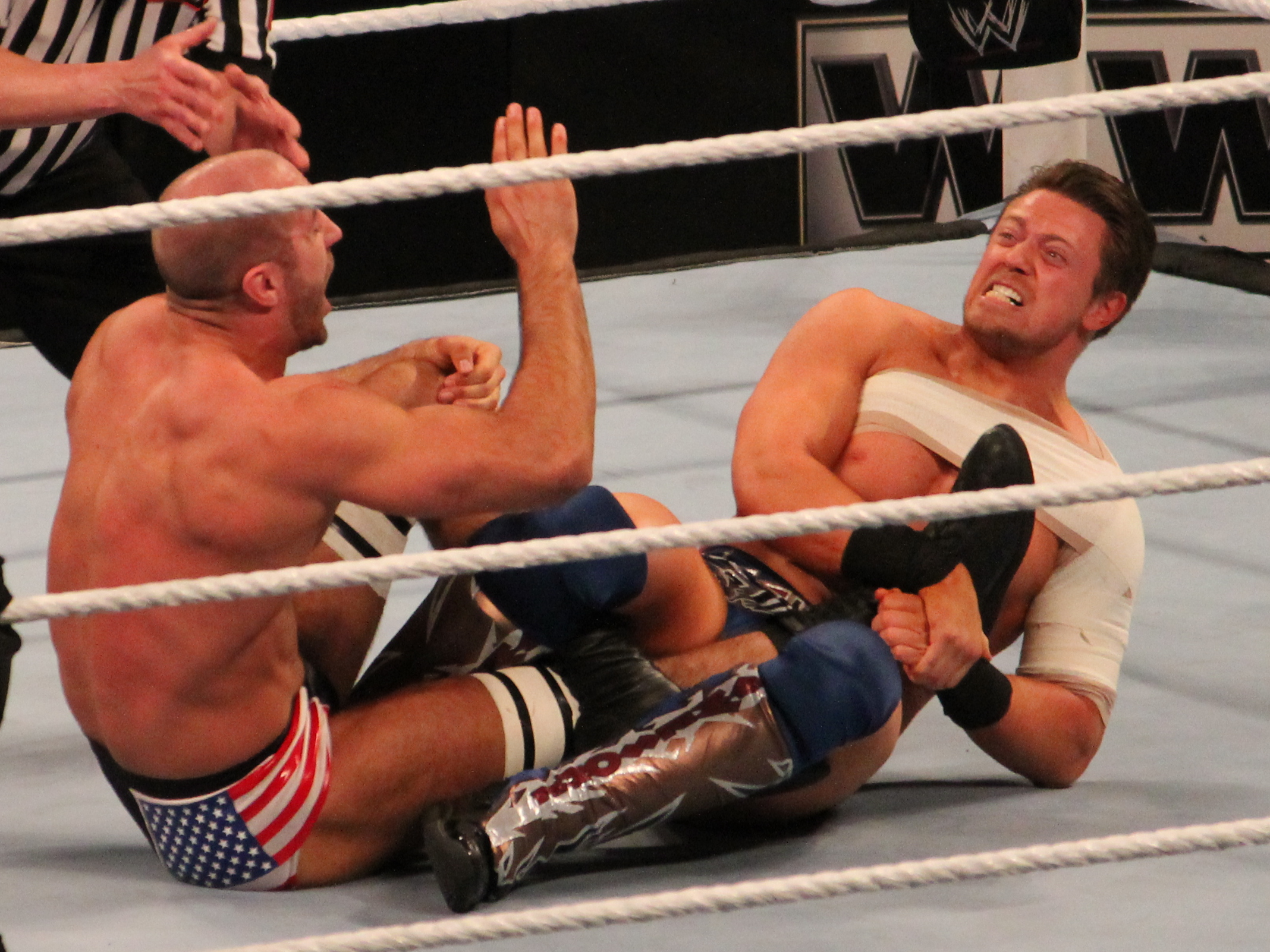
The Miz applying a figure-four leglock on Cesaro

The wrestler stands over the opponent who is lying on the mat face up and grasps a leg of the opponent. The wrestler then does a spinning toe hold and grasps the other leg, crossing them into a 4 (hence the name), and falls to the mat, applying pressure to the opponent's crossed legs with their own. While the hold applies pressure to the knee, it actually can be very painful to the shin of the victim. While the move is primarily a submission move, if the opponent has their shoulders on the mat, the referee can make a three count for a pinfall. If the referee is distracted, heel wrestlers may grab onto the ropes while executing the move to gain leverage and inflict more pain. This variation is the most famous version, invented by Buddy Rogers and popularized by Ric Flair, and is also the finisher of choice for several wrestlers like Greg "The Hammer" Valentine, "The American Dream" Dusty Rhodes, The Miz, AJ Styles, Jeff Jarrett, Tito Santana, Jack Brisco, Gerald Brisco, and The Silent Warrior. A modified variation exists more recently used by Shawn Michaels where the wrestler takes one of the opponent's legs, turns 90 degrees, then grabs the opponent's other leg and crosses it with the other, puts one foot in between and the other on the other leg, and then bridges over. With enough strength and willpower, the wrestler on defense can flip over onto their belly (and also their opponent), which is said to reverse the pressure onto the one who initially had the hold locked in. This counter to the figure-four is often called a "modified Indian deathlock" or sometimes referred to as a "sharpshooter variant". Charlotte Flair uses a bridging variation of the move referred to as a Figure Eight. For a figure eight, the wrestler will then push up into a bridge. This move can be compared to the Heel Hook in Brazilian Jiu-Jitsu.

On the Steve Austin Show Unleashed Podcast, George Scott was credited by Ric Flair as the person who came up with the idea that to reverse the figure-four leglock, the opponent would simply turn over onto their stomach.

===== Haas of Pain =====
This modified inverted reverse figure-four leglock variation sees the wrestler cross one leg of an opponent over them and stand on the crossed leg, then take hold of the free leg and lay down on their back, raising the opponent's legs up into the air and causing pain to their legs and lower back. The name is derived from Charlie and Russ, the Haas Brothers, who invented this move. This move is the finisher of Charlie Haas.

===== Inverted figure-four ankle lock =====
This submission hold involves a combination of the figure-four leglock and the ankle lock. However, instead of locking the opponent's legs in a "4" shape, the attacking wrestler crosses one of the opponent's legs over to the other leg. Then the attacking wrestler grapevines the other leg, turns their body in the direction of the crossed leg forcing the opponent onto their side to immobilize the leg at the foot on the mat to create pressure and performs an ankle lock submission hold. Eddie Guerrero used this move, sometimes transitioning from a headscissors takedown which sees him rolling backwards from the momentum over the supine opponent to end up at their legs to then apply the hold. He called this move the Lasso from El Paso and used the move until adopting an elevated cloverleaf as a finisher referring to it as the same name.

===== Kneeling figure-four leglock =====
Named Kangokugatame and translated as Prison Hold or Prison Lock in English, the opponent is down on their back with the wrestler standing over one of their legs. The wrestler applies a spinning toehold, crosses the opponent's legs and kneels on them. This move was innovated by the late Japanese wrestler Masa Saito.

===== Inverted figure-four leglock =====
This version is a variant which sees the opponent face up with the wrestler grabbing the opponent's legs, putting their own leg through, and twisting them as if doing a sharpshooter, but instead putting their other leg on the opponent's nearest foot, dropping down to the mat and applying pressure. Shawn Michaels popularized this move during his wrestling career.

===== Ringpost figure-four leglock =====
Sometimes called a "flying figure-four", the opponent is either downed or standing next to one of the ring corner posts. The wrestler exits the ring to the outside and drags the opponent by the legs towards the ring post, so that the post is between the opponent's legs (similar to when somebody 'crotches' their opponent with the ringpost). The executor then stands next to the ring apron, on the outside of the turnbuckle or ropes and applies the figure four leglock with the ring post between the opponent's legs. The performer of the hold then falls back while grabbing the opponent's legs or feet, hanging upside down from the ring apron. The ring post assists the move, creating more damage and leverage to the opponent's knee. This is an illegal hold as it both involves the attacker performing the move whilst outside the ring as well as using part of the ring (the ringpost) to execute the move. The move was invented by Bret Hart and was used by Diamond Dallas Page and Gail Kim.

===== Standing figure-four leglock =====
The opponent is down on their back with the wrestler standing over one of their legs with one foot placed on either side of the leg. The wrestler plants their foot in the knee of the opponent's other leg and then bends that leg at the knee over the top of the first leg, forming the figure four. The wrestler then bridges back. Steve Austin used this move during his WCW career while under his "Hollywood" gimmick, dubbing it "Hollywood & Vine".

===== Trailer hitch =====
Popularized by Jamie Noble, the opponent starts on their stomach with the attacker crossing one leg over the knee-pit of the other and holding that bent leg down by dropping to their side and placing their leg over it (passing that leg through the hole of the "4". The wrestler uses their foot to push the opponent's straight leg backwards and over the bent leg's ankle.

===== Heel hook =====
This hold is performed by placing the legs around a leg of an opponent and holding the opponent's foot in the armpit on the same side. The legs are used to control the movement of the opponent's body while the opponent's foot is twisted by holding the heel with the forearm and using the whole body to generate a twisting motion, hence creating severe medial torque on the ankle. This move can also be compared to the Figure-four leglock. This move has been used by Daniel Bryan and Bobby Fish as the Fish Hook Deluxe Edition. This move has been used in several other martial arts and is banned in most competitions due to the high risk of injury from this move.

==== Indian deathlock ====
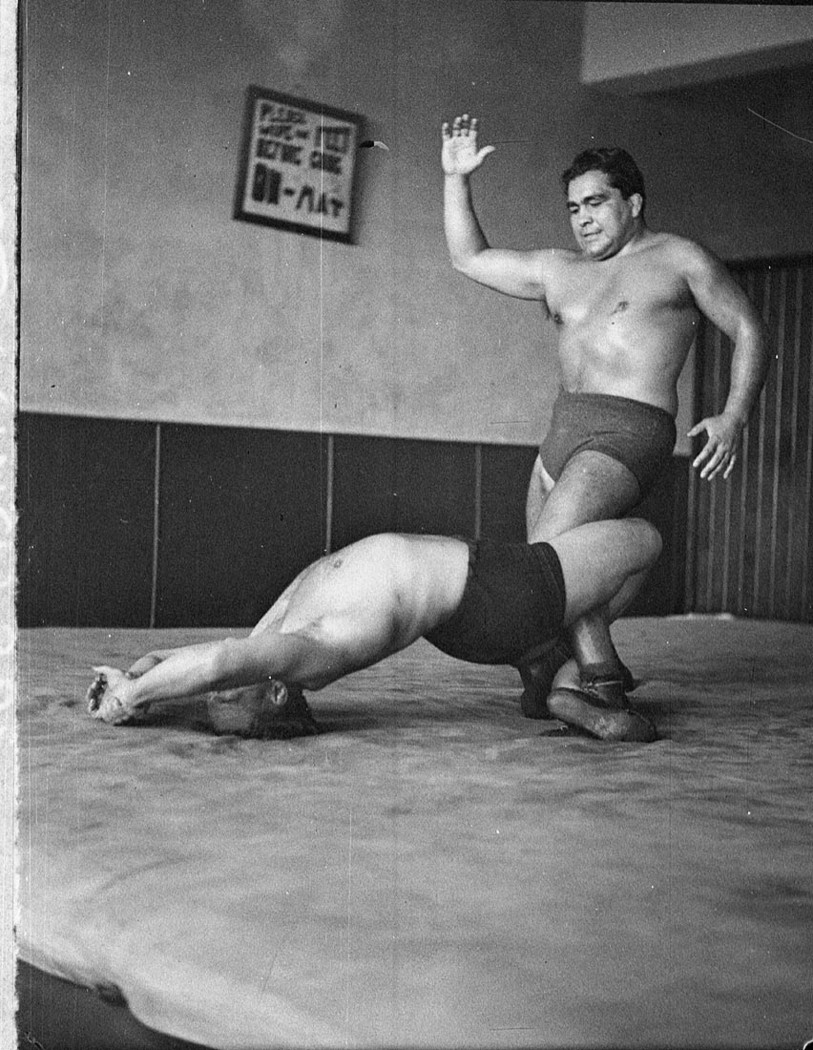
Chief Little Wolf demonstrating his Indian deathlock, Sydney, Australia, 1937.

Innovated by Chief Little Wolf, the wrestler lifts up a leg of a face-up opponent and wraps one of their legs around the other leg before dropping to a kneeling position, thus locking the opponent's leg behind the wrestler's knee. The wrestler then reaches over and grabs the opponent's far leg and places it on top of the trapped foot of the opponent. The wrestler then performs a forward roll while maintaining the hold. This forces the opponent onto their chest while the wrestler ends in a sitting position facing the same direction as their opponent. From here the wrestler can reach forward and perform many upper body submissions as well. A lot of superstars who used Native American gimmicks also used this as a finisher, such as Chief Jay Strongbow, Billy White Wolf, Wahoo McDaniel, and Jules Strongbow.

A standing version can also be applied, which sees a standing wrestler place one of their legs between the legs of a face-down opponent and then bend one leg behind the leg of the wrestler, placing it on top of the knee pit of the opponent's other leg. The wrestler then picks up the straight leg of the opponent, bends it backwards to lock the other leg in the knee pit and places the foot in front of the shin of the standing leg in the knee pit, thus locking the leg.

===== Inverted Indian deathlock =====
With the opponent on their back, the wrestler, standing beside them, sits with their leg over and between the opponent's legs (often using a legdrop to the knee). The wrestler then places the opponent's far leg in the knee-pit of the near leg, finishing the submission by putting the opponent's ankle on top of their own ankle, rolling both onto their bellies, and pushing back with the wrestler's knees. This move has been famously used by Triple H in WCW. It is used by Cody Rhodes as the American Nightmare.

==== Sharpshooter ====
Also (and originally) known as a "scorpion hold". This move is usually executed on a wrestler lying flat on their back. The wrestler executing the move will step between the opponent's legs, grab both of them, and twist them into a knot around their leg. Holding the opponent's legs in place, the wrestler then steps over the opponent and turns them over, applying pressure the whole way to cause pain to the knee and legs. While applying the pressure to the legs, the wrestler executing the move has a variety of positions they can be in; however, the two most common involve the wrestler standing and leaning back while applying the move or sitting on their opponent's back. The move was invented by Riki Choshu but was made famous in the United States by Bret "Hitman" Hart, who gave it the name Sharpshooter to suit his stage name. The move was first popularized in the States by Sting, who called the hold the Scorpion Death Lock and applied the hold from a seated position. The only difference between Sting's "Scorpion Death Lock" and the "Sharpshooter" is upon which leg the pressure is applied, as Sting's targets the right leg and the "Sharpshooter" targets the left leg. Evil uses a variation called Darkness Scorpion, where the move is preceded by a stomp into the groin area. It is currently used by current WWE wrestler Natalya Neidhart as a finisher. Famous Luchador Blue Demon Jr. also uses a modified variant of this move as well, in which he does an inverted sharpshooter and then uses his free arm to pull back his opponent's arm.

==== Inverted Sharpshooter ====
For this variation, the wrestler steps between the opponent's legs with one of their own and crosses the opponent's legs so that their near leg's ankle is in the far leg's knee pit. The wrestler then does not mount the opponent, but instead remains to the side of the opponent and pushes to cause pain. The Rated R Superstar, Edge used this variation, calling it the Edgecator.

==== Spinning toe hold ====
Used by Terry Funk and Dory Funk Jr., the wrestler using this move stands over the opponent who is lying face up on the mat and grasps a leg of the opponent. The wrestler then turns 360 degrees over the leg, twisting it inward. A wrestler can repeatedly step over the leg and around again to twist the knee and ankle joints even more. This can also be used as a setup move for leg locks such as the Figure 4 Leglock and the Indian Deathlock.

==== Wishbone ====
The wrestler stands at the feet of a supine opponent. They grab and lift either one of the opponent's leg with both hands, while placing their foot onto opponent's free foot still on the mat to anchor it in place. The wrestler's while standing up on their own leg begins to push the opponent's grabbed leg away from them to apply pressure, stretching groin of the opponent. The wrestler may also twist the opponent's leg at the foot for additional pressure. The move is named after the tradition of pulling on a wishbone. This move shares the same name but is not to be confused with the double-team move.

== Chokes ==
=== Anaconda vise ===
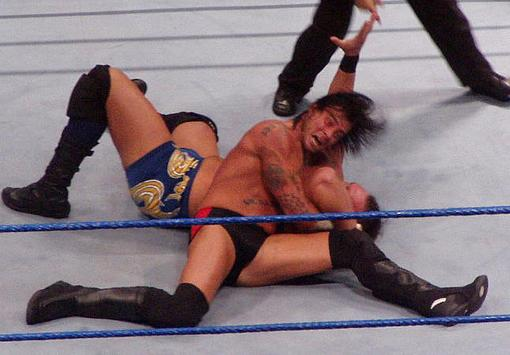
CM Punk doing an anaconda vise on Mike Knox

The anaconda vise is a compression choke. The wrestler wraps their arms around the head and one arm of the opponent and squeezes, choking the opponent. It is considered legal in professional wrestling, although it is a chokehold. This submission hold was invented by Hiroyoshi Tenzan.

Also known as an arm-trap triangle choke. The vise is done from a position in which the wrestler and the opponent are seated on the mat facing each other. The wrestler sits on one side of the opponent, encircles the opponent in a headlock position using their near arm, and grabs the opponent's near wrist, bending the arm upwards. Then, the wrestler maneuvers their other arm through the "hole" created by the opponent's bent wrist, locks their hand upon their own wrist, and pulls the opponent forward, causing pressure on the opponent's arm and neck. CM Punk popularized the usage of this move.

There are also variations of the anaconda vise that are combined with a single arm straight jacket choke called an Anaconda Max and a cobra clutch called an Anaconda Cross. These variations are also invented and used by Tenzan himself.

=== Arm triangle choke ===
Also called an arm triangle, this choke sees the wrestler wrapping their arm from under the opponent's nearest arm(pit) and across the chest. The maneuver can be used as an uncommon submission maneuver, such as used by Braun Strowman, or a transitioning hold, usually to fall backwards into an arm triangle reverse STO. Austin Aries uses a bridging variation called Last Chancery as one of his finishing moves. Dexter Lumis uses this move called Silence, which sees him use the move from either a standing and seated position, with the latter sometimes transitioning from a sitout sideslam.

=== Bulldog choke ===
Also known as a Bulldog headlock in BJJ, the wrestler, like a guillotine choke, tucks the other wrestlers head under their armpit. But unlike the standard guillotine choke, the wrestler tucks the other wrestler's head so that the face the opposite direction of a guillotine choke. Mainly used as a setup for the bulldog, this move has been used commonly in MMA and other sports. Often at times, this move can be confused with a side headlock. AEW wrestler Jon Moxley uses this move as a finisher sometimes while transitioning into it from already having applied a sleeper hold or rear naked choke using either move to take the opponent down.

=== Corner foot choke ===
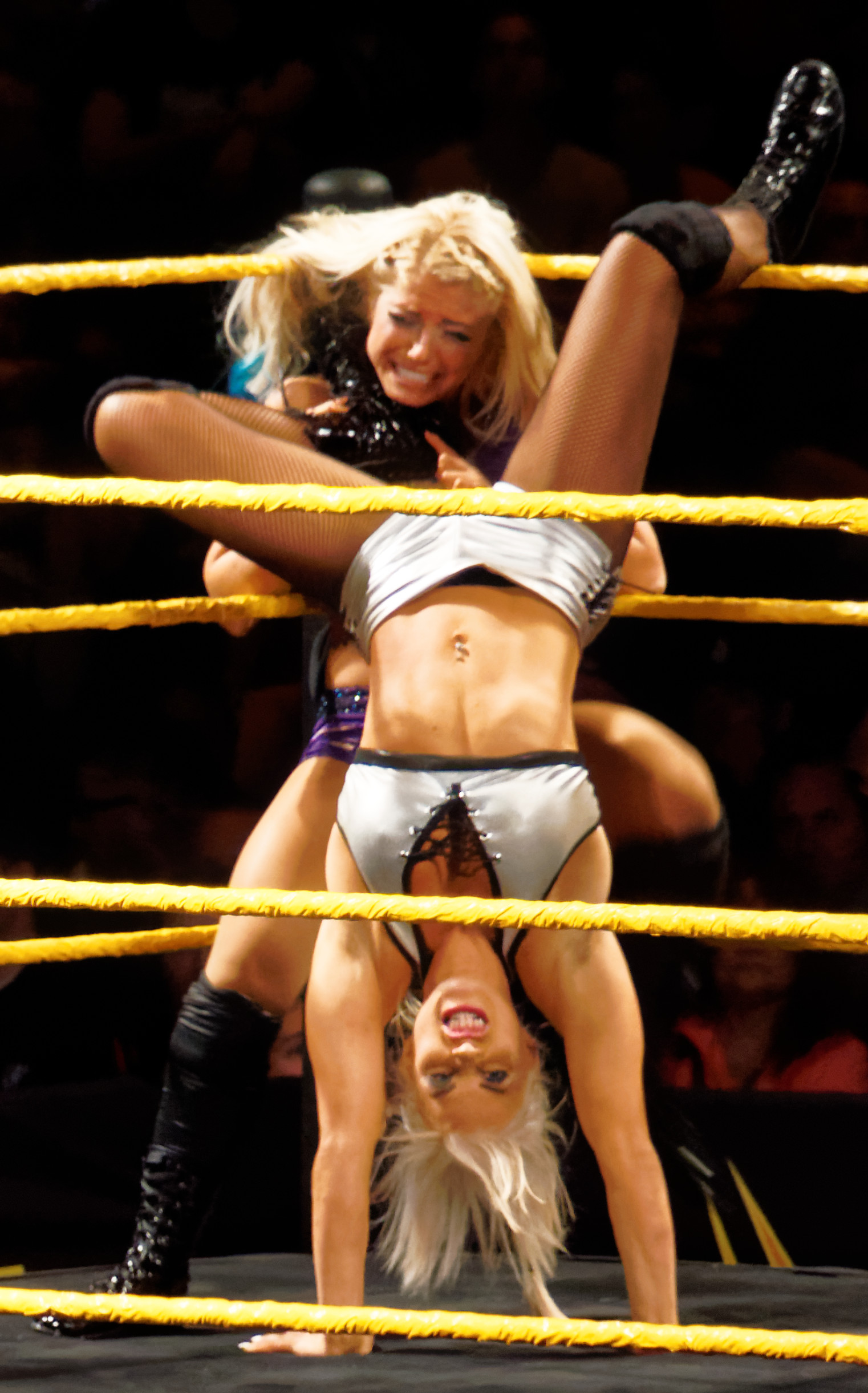
Dana Brooke applying a corner foot choke in a handstand position on Alexa Bliss

The wrestler pushes their standing or seated opponent into the turnbuckle and extends their leg, choking their opponent while using the top two ropes for support. This attack is illegal and results in a wrestler's disqualification, should the move not be broken by a count of five. William Regal used a variation where he would face the opposite direction while distracting the referee, allowing him to maintain the choke for a prolonged period of time.

For some flexible wrestlers, a variation of this move can be performed while standing in the performance of a standing split. Another variant performed by Dana Brooke is done in a handstand position while she chokes the opponent with one foot.

=== Double choke ===
The wrestler grabs their opponent's throat with both hands and throttles them. A chokelift can be used as well if the wrestler were to perform a chokebomb or a two-handed chokeslam.

=== Figure-four necklock/headlock ===
This neck lock sees a wrestler sit above a fallen opponent and wrap their legs around the opponent in the form of the figure-four, with one leg crossing under the opponent's chin and under the wrestler's other leg the wrestler squeezes and chokes the opponent. In an illegal version of the hold, best described as a hanging figure-four necklock, the wrestler stands on top of the turnbuckle, wraps their legs around the head of the opponent (who has their back turned against the turnbuckle) in the figure-four and falls backwards, choking the opponent. In most matches the hold would have to be released before a five count. This move was popularized by former WWE Wrestlers Candice Michelle and Carmella. Carmella also uses an inverted variant of this hold as her finisher where she uses her shin to choke the opponent instead, making it resemble a gogoplata. This variant is called the Code of Silence.

=== Gogoplata ===
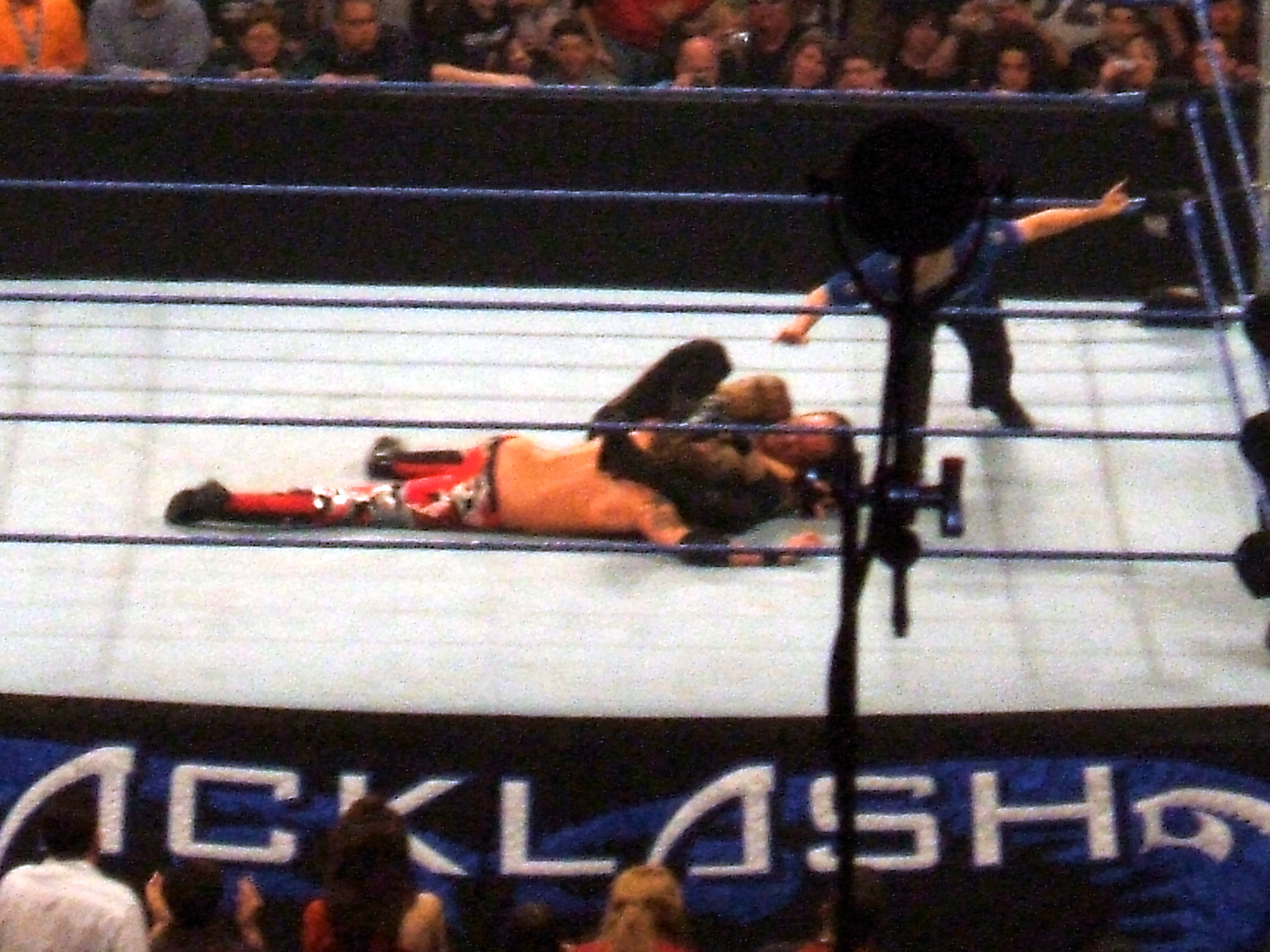
The Undertaker uses the Hell's Gate (gogoplata) on Edge

Usually executed from a "rubber guard," where the legs are held very high, against the opponent's upper back. The wrestler then slips one foot in front of the opponent's head and under their chin, locks their hands behind the opponent's head, and chokes the opponent by pressing their shin or instep against the opponent's trachea. Wrestlers use a modified version, where they only push the shin into the throat in exactly the same manner (instead of grabbing their toes and pulling towards themselves). The Undertaker used this as his submission finisher, calling it Hell's Gate. Tyson Kidd uses a variation where he laces his opponent's legs as if he was to perform a Sharpshooter, but then falls to his back, and then locks in the Gogoplata. He names this move, the Hart Lock.

=== Guillotine choke ===
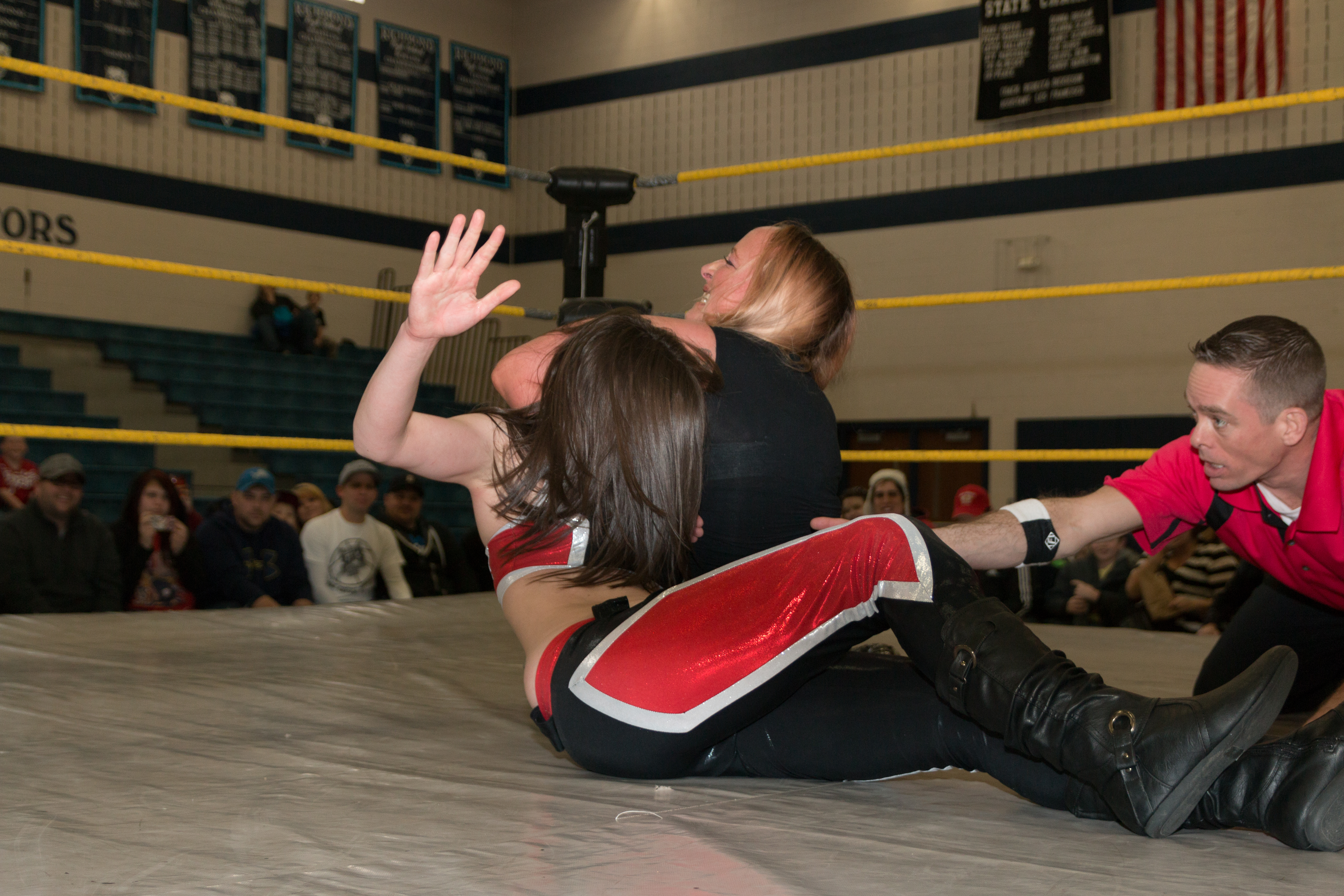
Randi West traps Skyler Rose (front) in a guillotine choke

The wrestler faces their opponent, who is bent over. The attacking wrestler tucks the opponent's head underneath their armpit and wraps one arm around the neck so that the forearm is pressed against the throat, as in a front chancery. The attacking wrestler then wraps their legs around the opponent's midsection with a body scissors and arches backwards, pulling the opponent's head forward, stretching the torso and the neck. It can be performed from standing, sitting, or prone positions. This move is also sometimes dubbed the King Crab Lock. This move is most recently used by Roman Reigns in his "Tribal Chief" character. Liv Morgan used this move as her finisher by transitioning it into a DDT in her early days in WWE's developmental territory NXT from 2014 to 2017.

=== Half nelson choke ===
Also known as a cobra choke or a kata ha jime (a term borrowed from judo), this hold sees the wrestler put the opponent in a half nelson with one arm and grab the opponent's neck with the other, sometimes while adding body scissors. The move was popularized by Taz, who used it as a finishing move, calling it the Tazmission. His son, AEW wrestler Hook, also adopted it as his finishing maneuver, rebranding it as Redrum.

=== Hart lock/Dungeon lock ===
Essentially a Gogoplata with leg submission, the wrestler steps over their opponent's leg and then laces the opponent's legs together, as a standard Sharpshooter would be performed. But instead of taking a big step forward to lock in the Sharpshooter submission, the wrestler falls to their back and then catches the opponent's throat with their shinbone, as if to perform a Gogoplata. Tyson Kidd formerly used this move.

=== Koji clutch ===
The opponent lies face down on the mat. The wrestler lies face up and slightly to the side of the opponent. The wrestler hooks their far leg across the neck of the opponent, then hooks their hands behind the opponent's head, having one arm pass over their own leg and the other under. The wrestler then pulls backwards with their arms and pushes forward with their leg, causing pressure. The name comes from its inventor's name, Koji Kanemoto. This move is commonly transitioned from a reverse STO. Another variation sees the attacker performing a reverse STO, then locking the regular Koji clutch in, but crossing their legs in a modified figure-four headscissors. Sami Zayn formerly used this move during his time in NXT.

=== Leg choke ===
With the opponent hung over the second rope, facing the outside of the ring, the attacking wrestler hooks their left or right leg over the back of the opponent's neck. The attacking wrestler then pulls the second rope upwards, compressing the opponent's throat between the rope and attacking wrestler's leg, choking them. This move is illegal due to usage of the ring ropes, and results in a disqualification for the wrestler should they not release the hold before a count of five.

=== Pentagram choke ===
In this variation of the triangle choke, the wrestler sits behind a seated opponent. The wrestler places one of their legs under the chin of the opponent and pushes up. The wrestler then takes hold of their ankle with their opposite arm and pulls their leg up. The wrestler then places their free leg on the instep of the leg which is already being used to choke the opponent. The wrestler finally takes their free arm, hooks the opponent's arm which is in the vise, and holds their opposite leg from the knee. The pressure is applied once the wrestler compresses their knees together. The pentagram choke creates a complete vise around the opponent's neck, and its name comes from using five sides, whereas the triangle choke only uses three.

=== Single arm choke ===
The wrestler grabs their opponent's throat with one hand and squeezes tightly. A "goozle" is a single arm choke held briefly before performing a chokeslam.

=== Sleeper hold ===
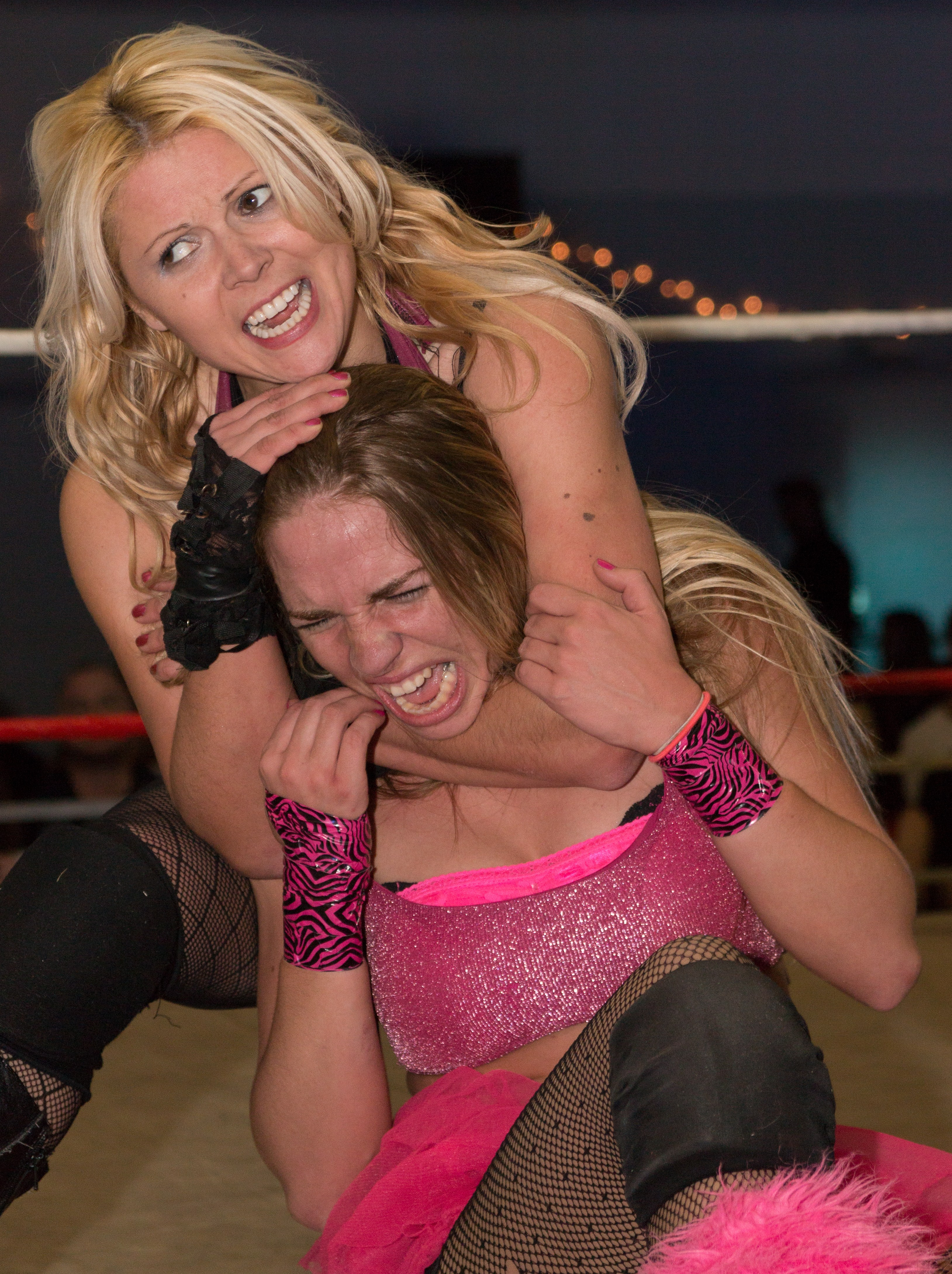
Jewells Malone locks in a sleeper hold on Beautiful Beaa

Innovated by Ed Lewis, the wrestler begins positioned behind their opponent. The wrestler then wraps their arm around the opponent's neck, pressing the biceps against one side of the neck and the inner bone of the forearm against the other side. The neck is squeezed inside the arm very tightly. Additional pressure can be applied by grabbing the left shoulder with the right hand, or grabbing the biceps of the left arm near the elbow, then using the left hand to push the opponent's head towards the crook of the right elbow. Popularized by Brutus Beefcake, Waylon Mercy, Dolph Ziggler, Minoru Suzuki, and most recognized with Roddy Piper. This move is also being used by indie wrestler The Silent Warrior, a wrestler who is deaf.

==== Arm-hook sleeper ====
Also known as a "buffalo sleeper", this choke sees the wrestler kneeling behind a seated opponent before grabbing hold of one of the opponent's arms, bending it backwards overhead, and locking the opponent's wrist into the attacker's armpit. The wrestler then wraps their free arm under the opponent's chin as in a sleeper hold, puts their other arm through the arch created by the opponent's trapped arm, and locks their hands. The wrestler then squeezes the opponent's neck, causing pressure. The move was invented by Hiroyoshi Tenzan.

==== Cobra clutch ====
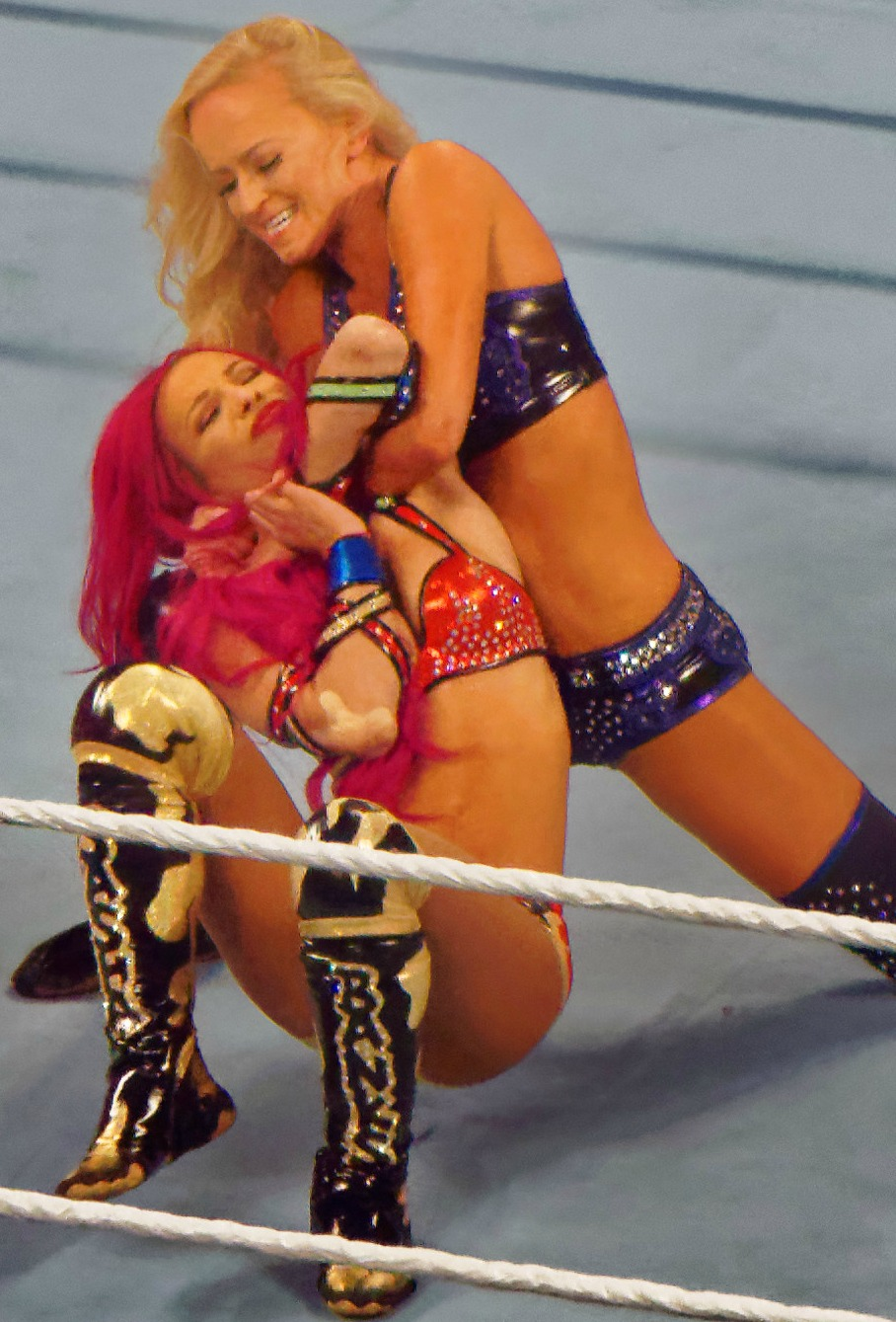
Summer Rae applying the cobra clutch on Sasha Banks

Also known as an "arm-trap half nelson sleeper", the wrestler stands behind the opponent and uses one arm to place the opponent in a half nelson. The wrestler then uses their free arm to pull the opponent's arm (the same arm to which the wrestler is applying the half nelson) across the face of the opponent. The wrestler then locks their hand to their wrist behind the opponent's neck to make the opponent submit or lose consciousness as the carotid artery is cut off.

This submission has been used as a "finishing" maneuver by a number of wrestlers over the years, including Sgt. Slaughter and Jim "The Anvil" Neidhart, who called it the Anvilizer; Ted DiBiase Sr., Ted DiBiase Jr., and The Ringmaster, who called it the Million Dollar Dream; and Kazuchika Okada, who calls it the Money Clip.

==== Bridging cobra clutch ====
With the opponent lying face down, the wrestler sits beside the opponent, facing the same way, locks on the cobra clutch, and then arches their legs and back, bending the opponent's torso and neck upwards. Used by Delirious.

==== Dragon sleeper ====
The attacking wrestler stands behind the opponent who is either sitting or lying face down, then pulls the opponent into an inverted facelock, often hooking the opponent's near arm with their free arm. The attacker then pulls backwards and up, wrenching the opponent's neck and spine. If the opponent is sitting, the wrestler can press their knee into the opponent's back, adding pressure. Invented by Karl Gotch, passed down to Tatsumi Fujinami, and popularized in the United States by Último Dragón. A standing variation of this move was used by The Undertaker, who called it Takin' Care of Business. Low Ki once used a version from a back-mount position called the Dragon Clutch. Sanada used this hold while applying with bodyscissors as the Skull End. Drew Gulak uses a kneeling variation of the submission called the Gu-Lock. Malakai Black uses a variation where he reaches behind his back and clamps his hands together, he names the move, Dark Ritual.

==== Hangman's choke ====
The wrestler wraps their arm around the opponent's neck performing a sleeper hold, then climbs to the second rope and hangs the opponent by the neck. This move is illegal due to usage of the ring ropes, and results in a disqualification for the wrestler should they not release the hold before a count of five.

==== Rear naked choke ====
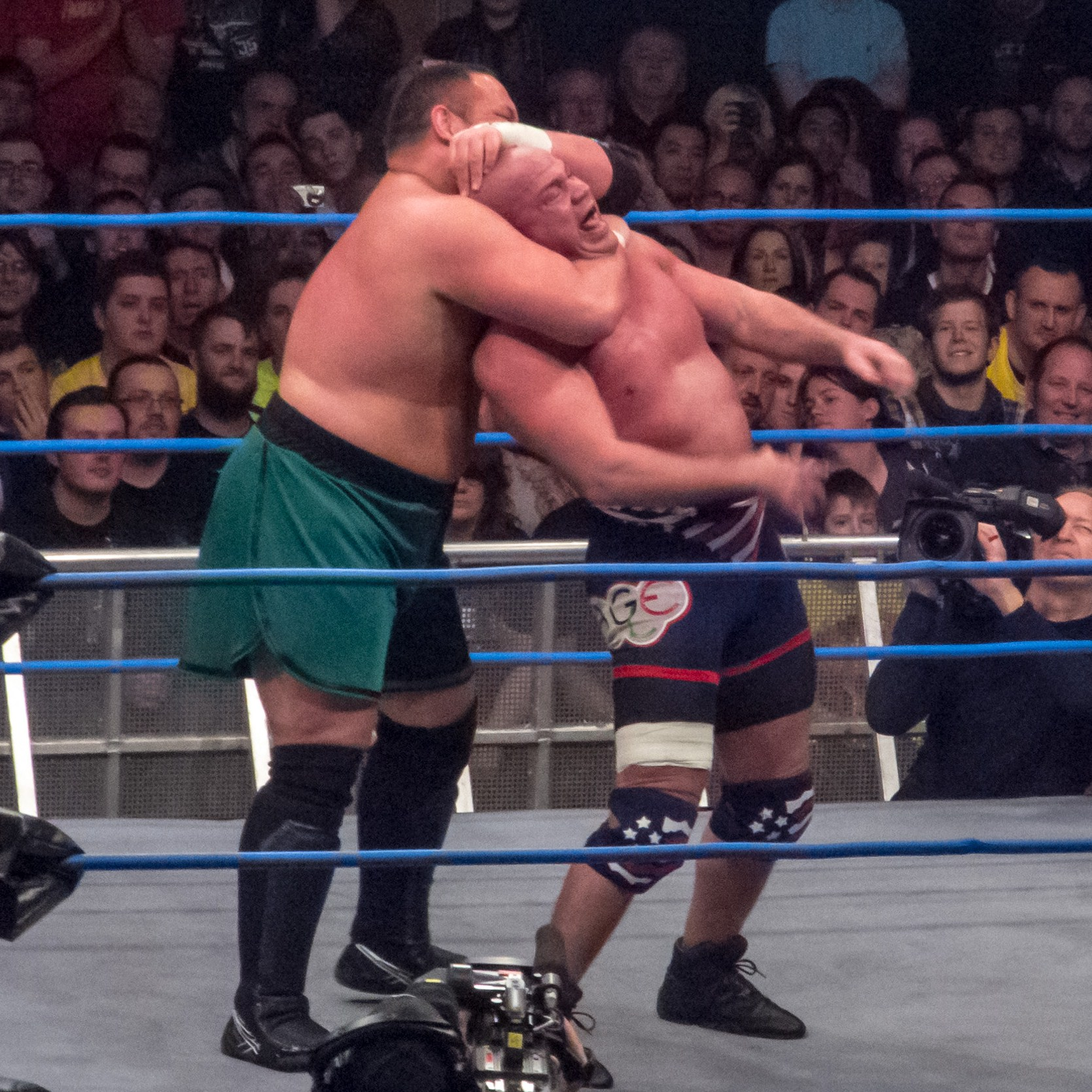
Samoa Joe applying the Coquina Clutch, a rear naked choke, on Kurt Angle.

A grounded version of a sleeper hold with an added body scissors that is derived from martial arts and more recently mixed martial arts. AEW and ROH wrestler Samoa Joe uses this as his signature submission hold, calling it the Coquina Clutch, and current WWE wrestler Shayna Baszler uses it as her finisher, calling it the Kirifuda Clutch. A variation, called a bar-arm sleeper is where one applies a normal sleeper to the opponent and uses the opposite arm close to their face as added pressure applied to the move. This variation is used by Karrion Kross and it is called the Kross Jacket.

==== Spider twist ====
Also known as a headscissors crucifix choke, the opponent is sitting while the wrestler is behind the opponent holding the opponent's wrist. The wrestler will apply an armscissor with one leg and a headscissors. then the wrestler clasps their hand, one arm passes through the leg applying the headscissors and the other goes under. The wrestler pulls upwards while their leg goes downwards, applying pressure to the shoulders, head and back. Innovated by Mariko Yoshida, it is currently used by Naomi, naming it Feel the Glow, formerly known as Starstruck during her run in Impact Wrestling.

=== Straight jacket ===
Also known as a "Japanese stranglehold" (goku-raku gatame), "criss-cross stranglehold", "cut-throat", and "cross-armed choke". The wrestler sits on the back of an opponent who is lying face down on the mat. The wrestler then grabs hold of the opponent's wrists and crosses their arms under their chin. The wrestler then pulls back on the arms, causing pressure. The move was invented and popularized by Jinsei Shinzaki.

The hold can also be applied while standing with the opponent's arms crossed across their chest or stomach held by the attacker to transition into other moves such as a suplex or an iconoclasm.

=== Thumb choke hold ===
The attacking wrestler stands behind an opponent and reaches around the opponent's neck with one arm. The wrestler then extends a thumb and thrusts it into the windpipe or carotid artery of the opponent, cutting off their air or blood supply. The former would not be acceptable in traditional professional wrestling, as all chokeholds that cut off the windpipe are not allowed in the sport. This was famously used by Don Muraco as the Asiatic Spike and Terry Gordy (which he learned from Killer Khan) as the Oriental Spike.

=== Tongan death grip ===
The wrestler darts their hand under an opponent's chin and grabs ahold of a pressure point above the throat, squeezing the nerve. This cuts off the air supply and the opponent fades out, yet this is not considered an air choke as it is not squeezing the windpipe. This hold is unique in that it can be used as a sleeper-like submission or, should the "unconscious" opponent end up lying on their back, a pinfall. Used as a finisher by Haku and Bone Soldier. This move was used by former NWA superstar Tyrus, previously known as the "G-Grip" which saw him transition the move into an STO during his stint in the WWE, and his recent version the "T-Slam" transitioning the move into a chokeslam. The move has recently been used by Jacob Fatu.

=== Triangle choke ===
The wrestler grabs hold of one of their opponent's arms, wraps their legs around the opponent's throat and arm in a figure-four and squeezes. Different promotions have different rules regarding the legality of this maneuver. The justification for its legality is that, like a head scissors, it uses the legs rather than the hands to perform the "choke"; also, it does not crush the windpipe (strangulation); rather, it compresses the carotid arteries (jugulation). This move is used by Shane McMahon and CM Punk.

=== Two handed chokelift ===
The wrestler grasps an opponent's neck with both hands then lifts them up. This is a transition hold for moves such as a two-handed chokeslam and a chokebomb.

== Transition holds ==
Some holds are meant neither to pin an opponent, nor weaken them nor force them to submit, but are intended to set up the opponent for another attack.

=== Arm wrench ===
The wrestler takes hold of the opponent's arm or wrist and turns around completely while twisting the arm over the wrestler's head, resulting in the opponent's arm being wrenched. This may lead to an armbar, a wrist lock, the wrestler pulling the opponent onto their shoulders in a fireman's carry, an Irish whip, or a short-arm maneuver, such as a clothesline.

=== Butterfly ===
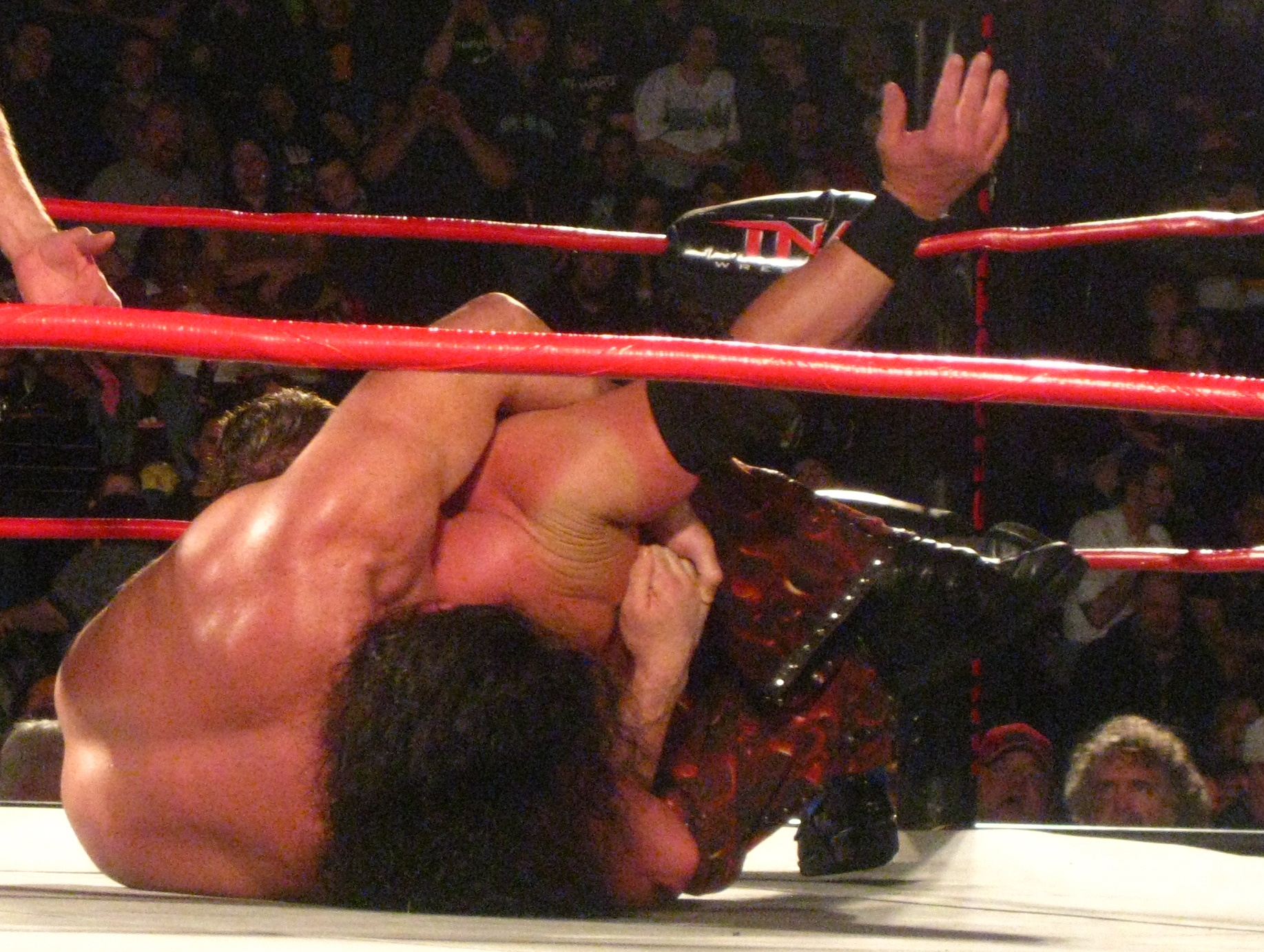
Matt Hardy applying a double underhook on A.J. Styles

Also referred to as a reverse nelson and double underhook. The wrestler and the opponent begin facing one another, with the opponent bent over. The wrestler approaches the opponent and reaches under the opponent's shoulders, then threads their arms up and around the opponent's torso, with their hands meeting in the middle of the opponent's back or neck (essentially an inverted full nelson hold), and tucking the opponents head in their armpit. The hold itself can be and sometimes is used as a submission move, but it is more commonly used as a transition hold to set up another move such as a suplex, a DDT, a facebuster, or a powerbomb. One wrestler who does use the move as a submission is Matt Hardy; his Ice Pick maneuver sees him lock the double underhook on an opponent while simultaneously trapping the opponent in a bodyscissors lock.

==== Single underhook ====
Similar to a double underhook, but only one arm is underhooked and the head of the opponent is placed into a front facelock. It can be transitioned into a DDT, suplex, etc. Used by Yoshi-Hashi as Butterfly Lock.

=== Corner-trap ===
The wrestler takes hold of an opponent that's standing on either of the ropes in the corner and pulls them down into a bent over position to trap their head with the top turnbuckle. It is used by Will Ospreay as a way to set up his Cheeky Nandos Kick.

=== Crucifix ===
The wrestler stands in front of and facing a bent over opponent and places them in a gutwrench waistlock or a standing headscissors. The wrestler then flips the opponent up and over so the opponent is lying face up on the back of the wrestler. The wrestler then moves their hands to the upper arm or wrists of the opponent, holding them in position, and spreading the arms of the opponent as though they were being crucified, hence the name. This is often a set-up for a crucifix powerbomb or a spinning crucifix toss.

==== Reverse crucifix ====
The wrestler stands in front of and with their back to a standing opponent. The wrestler then leans backwards and seizes the opponent around the waist, pulling them forward and upwards so they are lying across the shoulder of the opponent, facing downwards. The wrestler then takes hold of the upper arms or wrists of the opponent and spreads them, holding the opponent in place.

=== Deadlift ===
This transition refers to any instance of a wrestler lifting the opponent from the ground to transition to a bigger move. Examples of this are when a wrestler performs a gutwrench lift to an opponent laying down on to execute a gutwrench suplex or a gutwrench powerbomb, or when a wrestler performs a schoolboy powerbomb.

=== Electric chair ===
A transitional hold in which an attacking wrestler hoists an opponent up onto their shoulders so that they are both facing in the same direction. It is often used to set up various drops and slams in singles competition. However it is more often used in a double team maneuver, known as a "doomsday device", wherein another wrestler uses flying attacks to knock opponents off the shoulders of the wrestler. Like many transition holds, the defensive wrestler often uses the position to perform a variety of counter moves, most notably the victory roll. Another counter of the electric chair position is the wrestler twisting over the opponent's shoulders so now they are facing the opposite direction, and from that position, the wrestler would backflip to hit a hurricanrana.

In Mexico's Lucha libre this hold is known as La Torre, Spanish for "The Tower". Lucha's "Electric chair" (Silla Eléctrica in Spanish) is the term used for two different, unrelated attacks. The atomic drop is the "common" version of the move, and the "Inverted Electric chair" (Silla Eléctrica invertida in Spanish) sets the attacking wrestler running towards a seated opponent both facing forward, then leaping and falling into a seated senton on the opponent's nape and shoulders.

=== Fireman's carry ===
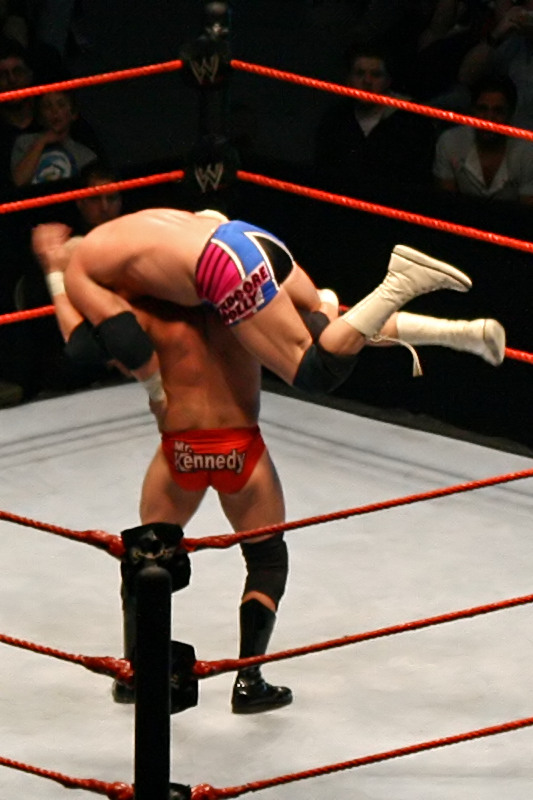
Mr. Kennedy holds Hardcore Holly in a fireman's carry, prior to executing a rolling fireman's carry slam, otherwise known as a "Green Bay Plunge"

The wrestler bends over with the opponent standing to the side of the wrestler. The wrestler then pulls the opponent's arm over their far shoulder and distributes the wrestler's body over their shoulders while having the other hand between and holding onto one of the opponent's legs and stands up. The opponent is draped face-down across the wrestler's shoulders, with the wrestler's arms wrapped around from behind. It is a key component of several throws, drops and slams.

=== Float over ===
The wrestler stands face-to-face with the opponent, ducks, hooks one of their arms over the opponent's shoulder (if seizing the opponent's left shoulder, they hook with their right, or opposite if sides are reversed), swings under the opponent's armpit, then around and over the opponent's back, so that it faces the same way as the opponent.

=== Gorilla press ===
Also known as Military press. A transition lift to perform many throws, drops and slams. It became a popular technique for larger and stronger wrestlers as the lift is seen to emphasize their height and power. It is mostly used by Mark Henry, Goldberg, Beth Phoenix, Ric Flair, Sting, Kurt Angle, Jason Jordan, and Nia Jax. It is innovated by Gorilla Monsoon.

=== Gutwrench ===
A set-up for many throws and slams, this sees the attacking wrestler put a bent at the waist opponent to one side of them, reach the near hand around, and lock their hands around the opponent's waist. A common move out of this transition can be a powerbomb or a suplex.

=== Lady of the lake ===
The move used to trick an unsuspecting opponent. The wrestler sits down, crosses their legs, tucks their head into their chest and wraps one arm around their ankle (so they are effectively rolled into a ball). The wrestler then extends their remaining arm between their legs and then waits. The opponent, ostensibly confused, normally takes the offered hand, at which point the wrestler rolls forward and into an armlock. This was used by Johnny Saint as the Johnny Saint Special.

=== Mount ===
The wrestler sits on top of the opponent's torso, facing their head, with their legs on either side. When the opponent's head is facing the ground, the position is referred to as back mount. Various strikes, such as closed-fist punches, elbows, open-hand slaps, open-hand palm strikes, and hammer-fists to the opponent's head are often performed from this position. Closed fist punches are legal in WWE, but in other promotions, referees will tell wrestlers to watch the hand due to closed-fist punches being illegal. Palm strikes, slaps, and elbow strikes can be used in place of punches.

=== Pumphandle ===
The wrestler stands behind their opponent and bends them forward. One of the opponent's arms is pulled back between their legs and held, while the other arm is hooked. Then the wrestler lifts the opponent up over their shoulder. From here many throws, drops and slams can be performed. A double pumphandle exists, where the second arm is not hooked, it is also pulled under and between the opponent's legs.

=== Rope-hung ===
A rope-hung move sees the opponent trapped either over the top rope or between the top and second rope. From that position, the wrestler could execute many moves while the opponent is hung over/between the rope(s), for example a DDT or a neckbreaker.

==== Rope-trap ====
A slight and less common variation, similar to a corner-trap, in which a wrestler traps the opponent with the ropes as a way to set up for a move. An example of this is Sheamus's setup for the Beats of the Bodhrán.

=== Scoop ===
Facing the opponent, the wrestler reaches between the opponent's legs with one arm and reaches around their back from the same side with their other arm. The wrestler lifts their opponent up so they are horizontal across the wrestler's body. From here many throws, drops and slams can be performed. The scoop is also called the scoop powerslam where the wrestler puts their hand in middle of the opponent's legs and turns them.

=== Stepover toehold ===
The wrestler approaches the opponent who is lying face-down. The wrestler traps one of the opponent's ankles between their thighs (as seen primarily before applying an STF). From that point, the wrestler can apply other holds to the opponent, such as a fujiwara armbar or a three-quarter facelock.

=== Tilt-a-whirl ===
The wrestler stands facing the opponent. The wrestler bends the opponent down so they are bent facing in front on the wrestler's body. The wrestler reaches around the opponent's body with their arms and lifts them up, spinning the opponent in front of the wrestler's body, often to deliver a slam or most commonly a "tilt-a-whirl backbreaker" or a "pendulum backbreaker". Usually performed on a charging opponent, this can also be a transition hold for counterattacks that sees the wrestler hit many throws and drops like a DDT or headscissors takedown.

=== Wheelbarrow ===
This move is achieved when a wrestler wraps a forward-facing opponent's legs around their waist (either by standing behind an opponent who is lying face-first on the mat or by catching a charging opponent), applying a gutwrench hold and lifting the opponent up off the ground into the air, then either continuing lifting and falling backwards to wheelbarrow suplex, or forcing the opponent back down to the mat to hit a wheelbarrow facebuster. This can also be a transition hold for counterattacks that see the wrestler (who is being wheelbarrowed) hit many throws and drops, like a DDT or a bulldog and rolling pin combinations.

== Miscellaneous ==
=== Collar-and-elbow tie-up ===
The collar-and-elbow tie-up is one of the mainstays of professional wrestling, and many matches are begun with this move. It is a neutral move, but it easily transitions for either wrestler to a position of dominance. It is performed by approaching the opponent and putting one hand on the back of the opponent's neck while holding the elbow of the opponent's arm that is holding their own neck. It can also be used to immobilize an opponent by pushing them to the ground.

=== Giant swing ===
The wrestler takes hold of a supine opponent's legs and pivots rapidly, elevating the opponent and swinging the opponent in a circle. The wrestler may release the hold in mid-air or simply slow until the back of the opponent returns to the ground. This move is used by Cesaro as the Cesaro Swing.

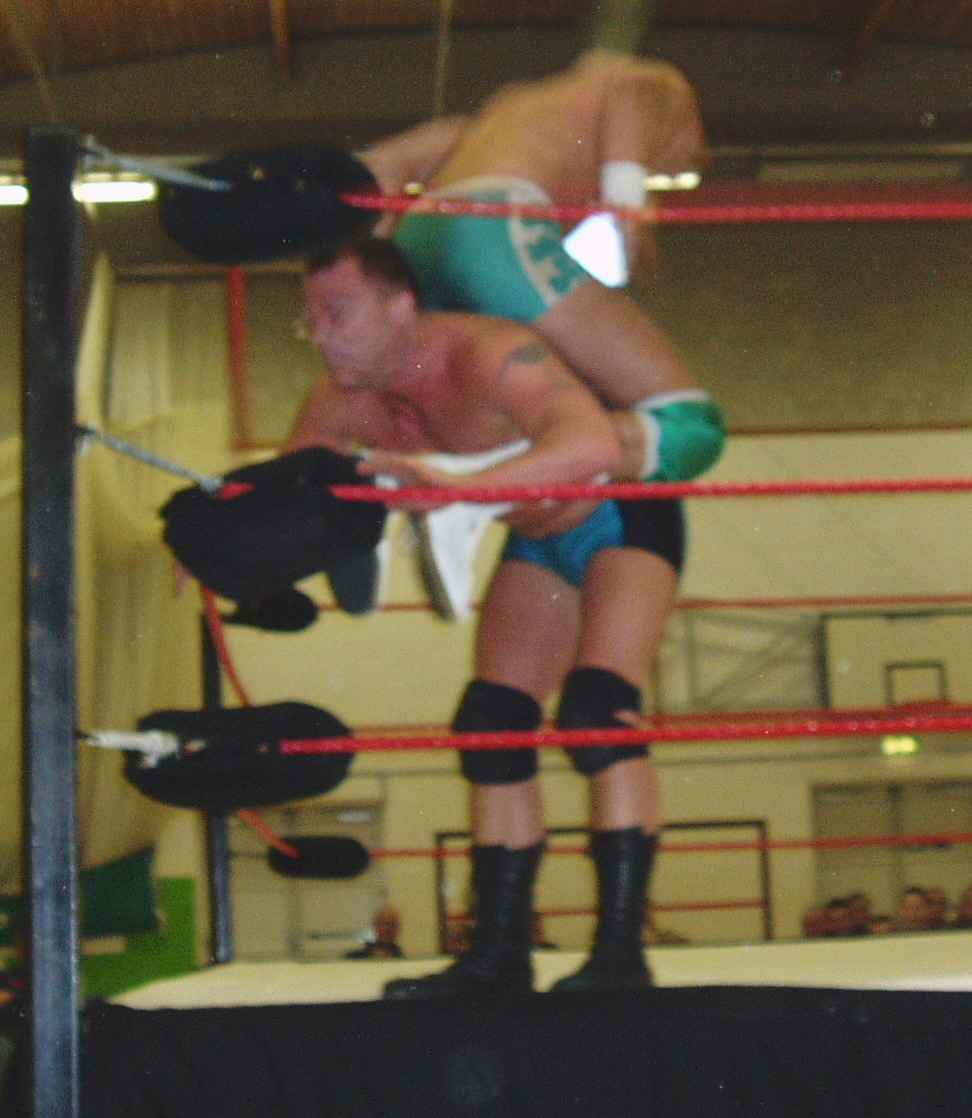
Eamon O'Neill performs a sunset flip out of the corner on Phil Powers

=== Hangman ===
This evasive move is used when the wrestler drops down or moves out of the way against an oncoming opponent who then loses their footing. This causes their momentum to send them flying over the rope becoming trapped between the top and middle rope hanging by their neck as they hang on to the top rope for leverage. The move is very dangerous for the opponent as the sudden stop could cause them to break their neck if they don't brace properly as well as the ring ropes can cut off air or blood supply if the ropes are wound too tight or are too thick as evident in a match between Cactus Jack and Vader during their feud.

=== Sunset flip ===
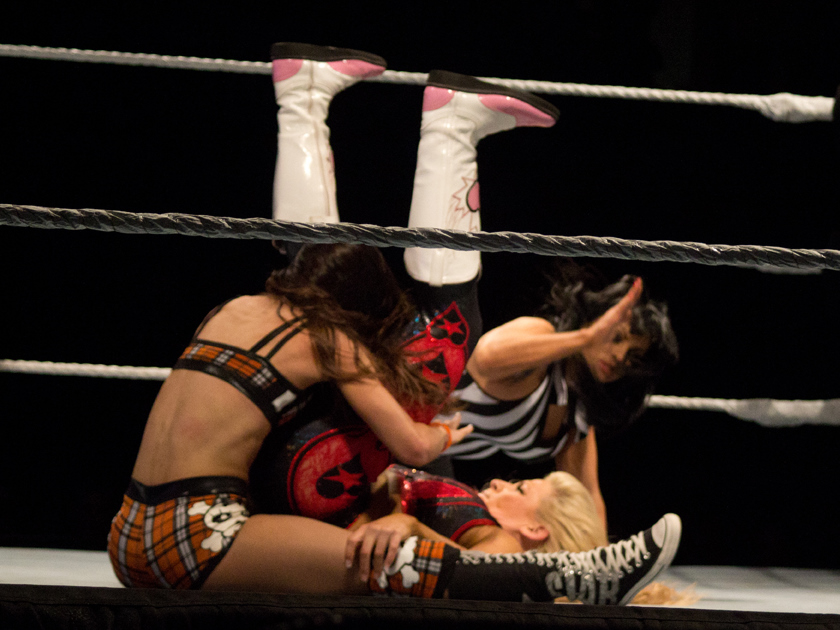
AJ Lee in the sitting pin position that results from a sunset flip

This move commonly sees an attacking wrestler dive over an opponent who is facing them, usually bent over forwards, catching the opponent in a waistlock from behind and landing back-first behind the opponent. From that position the wrestler rolls forward into a sitting position, pulling the opponent over backwards and down to the mat so that they land on their back into a sitout pin position. While being held on the shoulders of an attacking wrestler in a position where the opponent is straddling the head of the attacking wrestler while facing in the other direction. This move can be used as a counter from various powerbombs and other moves such as a Gory bomb. The move was used by Melina as the Last Call. Naomi uses this move to set up for the F.T.G submission manouvre.

=== Tree of woe ===
This involves a wrestler suspending an opponent upside down on a turnbuckle, with the opponent's back being up against it. To do this, the opponent's legs are then hooked under the top ropes, leaving the opponent facing the attacking wrestler, upside down. Often an attacking wrestler will choke, kick, or stomp the opponent until the referee uses up their five count. The technique is also used to trap an opponent while the attacking wrestler runs at them and delivers some form of offensive maneuver, such as a running knee attack or a baseball slide.

== See also ==
- Professional wrestling throws
- Professional wrestling aerial techniques
- Professional wrestling double-team maneuvers
