= Blair Tugman =

American mixed martial arts fighter

- Born: Lincroft, New Jersey, United States
- Other names: The Bull Shark
- Nationality: American
- Height: 5 ft 2 in (1.57 m)
- Weight: 146 lb (66 kg; 10.4 st)
- Division: Bantamweight; Featherweight; Lightweight
- Fighting out of: Branford, Connecticut, United States
- Team: Calandrelli Brazilian Jiu-Jitsu
- Years active: 2007–present

Mixed martial arts record
- Total: 18
- Wins: 11
- By submission: 4
- By decision: 7
- Losses: 7
- By submission: 2
- By decision: 5

Other information
- Mixed martial arts record from Sherdog

Blair Tugman is an American mixed martial artist currently competing in the Lightweight division of Bellator MMA. A professional competitor since 2007, he has also competed for CES MMA.

== Mixed martial arts career ==
=== Bellator MMA ===
Tugman faced A.J. McKee at Bellator 182 on August 25, 2017. He lost via unanimous decision.

== Mixed martial arts record ==
Professional record breakdown
18 matches	11 wins	7 losses
By knockout	0	0
By submission	4	2
By decision	7	5

Res.	Record	Opponent	Method	Event	Date	Round	Time	Location	Notes
Win	11–7	Shane Manley	Decision (unanimous)	CES MMA 51	August 3, 2018	3	5:00	Lincoln, Rhode Island, United States	Catchweight (150 lb) bout.
Loss	10–7	A.J. McKee	Decision (unanimous)	Bellator 182	August 25, 2017	3	5:00	Verona, New York, United States	
Win	10–6	Tom English	Submission (rear-naked choke)	Bellator 178	April 21, 2017	3	4:54	Uncasville, Connecticut, United States	
Win	9–6	Walter Smith-Cotito	Decision (unanimous)	Bellator 163	November 4, 2016	3	5:00	Uncasville, Connecticut, United States	Featherweight debut.
Win	8–6	Jay Perrin	Decision (split)	Bellator 153	April 22, 2016	3	5:00	Uncasville, Connecticut, United States	
Loss	7–6	Kin Moy	Submission (triangle choke)	Bellator 140	July 17, 2015	3	3:01	Uncasville, Connecticut, United States	Catchweight (138 lb) bout; Moy missed weight.
Win	7–5	Marvin Maldonado	Decision (unanimous)	Bellator 134: The British Invasion	February 27, 2015	3	5:00	Uncasville, Connecticut, United States	
Win	6–5	Brandon Fleming	Decision (unanimous)	Bellator 123	September 5, 2014	3	5:00	Uncasville, Connecticut, United States	
Loss	5–5	Andre Soukhamthath	Decision (unanimous)	CES MMA: New Blood	June 7, 2013	3	5:00	Lincoln, Rhode Island, United States	
Loss	5–4	John McLaughlin	Decision (unanimous)	Bellator 39	April 2, 2011	3	5:00	Uncasville, Connecticut, United States	
Win	5–3	Todd Sweeney	Submission (rear-naked choke)	CES MMA: Cage of Horrors	October 22, 2010	1	0:46	Mashantucket, Connecticut, United States	
Loss	4–3	Jessie Riggleman	Decision (unanimous)	RIE 1: Battle at the Burg	March 21, 2009	3	5:00	Harrisonburg, Virginia, United States	
Loss	4-2	Steve Deangelis	Submission (guillotine choke)	BCX 4: Battle Cage Xtreme 4	April 19, 2008	2	1:00	Atlantic City, New Jersey, United States	
Win	4-1	Josh Spearman	Submission (rear-naked choke)	ICE Fighter: Dead Man Walking	February 29, 2008	1	2:18	Worcester, Massachusetts, United States	
Win	3-1	Jason Frawley	Submission (rear-naked choke)	BCX 3: Battle Cage Xtreme 3	October 20, 2007	1	1:01	Atlantic City, New Jersey, United States	
Loss	2–1	Tim Troxell	Decision (unanimous)	BCX 2: Battle Cage Xtreme 2	September 15, 2007	3	5:00	Atlantic City, New Jersey, United States	
Win	2–0	Dan Hawley	Decision (unanimous)	Bodog Fight: Alvarez vs. Lee	July 14, 2007	3	5:00	Trenton, New Jersey, United States	
Win	1–0	Glenn Ortiz	Decision (unanimous)	EC 78: Extreme Challenge 78	June 9, 2007	3	5:00	Asbury Park, New Jersey, United States	Bantamweight debut.

== See also ==
- List of current Bellator fighters
- List of male mixed martial artists
