= Josh LaBerge =

American mixed martial arts fighter

- Born: Fall River, Massachusetts, United States
- Nationality: American
- Height: 5 ft 10 in (1.78 m)
- Weight: 151 lb (68 kg; 10.8 st)
- Division: Lightweight; Featherweight
- Reach: 71.0
- Stance: Orthodox
- Fighting out of: Fall River, Massachusetts, United States
- Team: Lauzon MMA
- Years active: 2007–2017

Mixed martial arts record
- Total: 18
- Wins: 11
- By knockout: 5
- By submission: 1
- By decision: 5
- Losses: 7
- By knockout: 4
- By submission: 2
- By decision: 1

Other information
- Mixed martial arts record from Sherdog

Josh LaBerge is an American mixed martial artist. A professional from 2007 until 2017, he fought in Strikeforce, Bellator and CES MMA.

== Background ==
Born and raised in Fall River, Massachusetts, LaBerge often was involved in street fights growing up, and once spent 90 days in jail for assault. Upon being released, LaBerge was involved in a fight while defending a relative, and was stabbed, causing a punctured lung and he was sent to the hospital in critical condition. LaBerge attended Durfee High School.

== Mixed martial arts career ==
=== Early career ===
After winning an amateur bout, LaBerge made his professional debut in late 2007. Facing 3-0 Andrew Carron, LaBerge was defeated via second-round TKO. Compiling a record of 5–4, LaBerge fought for the vacant Reality Fighting Featherweight Championship against champion Mike Gresh. LaBerge won via unanimous decision.

=== Bellator and Strikeforce ===
LaBerge made his second Bellator appearance at Bellator 17, against Dan Bonnell, whom he had previously defeated via first-round TKO. LaBerge won again, with a knockout in only 48 seconds.

After the win over Bonnell, LaBerge appeared for Strikeforce at Strikeforce: Fedor vs. Silva against Anthony Leone. In the biggest win of his career to date, LaBerge upset the future UFC veteran via doctor stoppage at the end of the first round.

2-0 under the Bellator banner, LaBerge fought again in the promotion at Bellator 134 against Connecticut native Matt Bessette. LaBerge was defeated via doctor stoppage at the end of the second round.

=== CES MMA ===
In 2016, LaBerge returned to the cage for the CES MMA promotion, based out of Rhode Island. Fighting now as a lightweight, LaBerge defeated Ran Weathers via unanimous decision at CES MMA 35. Two months later at CES 36, LaBerge won again via second-round TKO against Jonathan Lemke.

At CES MMA 42, LaBerge faced jiu-jitsu specialist and boxer Saul Almeida, losing via third-round submission.

LaBerge last fought in October 2017, losing in a rematch with Lemke via unanimous decision.

== Personal life ==
Aside from his career as a fighter, LaBerge works part time as a mason.

== Mixed martial arts record ==
Professional record breakdown
18 matches	11 wins	7 losses
By knockout	5	4
By submission	1	2
By decision	5	1

Res.	Record	Opponent	Method	Event	Date	Round	Time	Location	Notes
Loss	11–7	Jon Lemke	Decision (unanimous)	CES MMA 46: Howard vs. Carroll	October 27, 2017	3	5:00	Lincoln, Rhode Island, United States	
Loss	11–6	Saul Almeida	Submission (rear-naked choke)	CES MMA 42: Curtis vs. Santiago Jr.	March 31, 2017	3	4:50	Lincoln, Rhode Island, United States	
Win	11–5	Jon Lemke	TKO (punches)	CES MMA 36: Andrews vs. Muro	June 10, 2016	2	1:11	Lincoln, Rhode Island, United States	
Win	10–5	Ran Weathers	Decision (unanimous)	CES MMA 35: Jeudi vs. Gonzalez	April 16, 2016	3	5:00	Beverly, Massachusetts, United States	Return to Lightweight.
Loss	9–5	Matt Bessette	TKO (doctor stoppage)	Bellator 134: The British Invasion	February 27, 2015	2	5:00	Uncasville, Connecticut, United States	
Win	9–4	Steve McCabe	KO (knees)	Classic Entertainment and Sports: CES MMA 22	March 14, 2014	1	0:37	Lincoln, Rhode Island, United States	Catchweight (150 lb) bout.
Win	8–4	Anthony Leone	TKO (doctor stoppage)	Strikeforce: Fedor vs. Silva	February 12, 2011	1	5:00	East Rutherford, New Jersey, United States	
Win	7–4	Dan Bonnell	TKO (punches)	Bellator XVII	May 6, 2010	1	0:48	Boston, Massachusetts, United States	
Win	6–4	Mike Gresh	Decision (unanimous)	Reality Fighting: Detonation	January 16, 2010	3	5:00	Plymouth, Massachusetts, United States	Won the Reality Fighting Featherweight Championship.
Win	5–4	Dan Bonnell	TKO (punches)	WCF: World Championship Fighting 8	September 26, 2009	1	1:20	Wilmington, Massachusetts, United States	Return to Featherweight.
Win	4-4	Chris Simmons	Decision (unanimous)	Bellator II	April 10, 2009	3	5:00	Norman, Oklahoma, United States	
Win	3–4	Frank Latina	Decision (split)	USFL: Springfield Massacre	April 4, 2009	3	5:00	Springfield, Massachusetts, United States	Lightweight debut.
Loss	2–4	Aguilano Brandao	Submission (armbar)	FFP: Untamed 26	February 28, 2009	1	1:22	Westport, Massachusetts, United States	
Loss	2–3	Jon Owens	KO (knee)	EVO MMA: Fight Night For The Kids	January 22, 2009	1	0:40	Charlotte, North Carolina, United States	
Win	2-2	Barrington Douse	Decision (split)	USFL: War in the Woods 5	November 29, 2008	3	5:00	Ledyard, Connecticut, United States	
Loss	1–2	Adailton Reis	TKO (punches)	ICE Fighter: ICE Fighter	April 25, 2008	3	0:24	Worcester, Massachusetts, United States	
Win	1-1	Joe Rizzo	Submission (rear-naked choke)	ICE Fighter: Dead Man Walking	February 29, 2008	1	0:55	Worcester, Massachusetts, United States	
Loss	0–1	Andrew Carron	TKO (punches)	ICE Fighter: Put Up or Shut Up	November 17, 2007	2	2:08	Worcester, Massachusetts, United States	Catchweight (150 lb) bout.

== See also ==
- List of male mixed martial artists
