= Titan FC 27 =

Mixed martial arts event

Titan FC 27: Ricci vs. Gurgel
- Promotion: Titan Fighting Championship
- Date: February 28, 2014
- Venue: Memorial Hall
- City: Kansas City, Kansas

Event chronology
Titan FC 26: Brilz vs. Magalhaes	Titan FC 27: Ricci vs. Gurgel	Titan FC 28: Brilz vs. Davis

Titan FC 27: Ricci vs. Gurgel was a mixed martial arts event, held on February 28, 2014, at the Memorial Hall in Kansas City, Kansas.

== Official fight card ==
Main Card
Weight class				Method	Round	Time	Notes
Lightweight	Mike Ricci	def.	Jorge Gurgel	TKO (punches and elbows)	1	3:57
Middleweight	Matt Riddle	def.	Michael Kuiper	Submission (guillotine choke)	2	2:29
Lightweight	Kurt Holobaugh	def.	Eric Marriott	Decision (unanimous)	3	5:00
Bantamweight	Kevin Croom	def.	Bryan Goldsby	Decision (unanimous)	3	5:00
Bantamweight	Anthony Gutierrez	def.	Charlie DuBray	Submission (triangle choke)	1	0:59
Featherweight	Kalvin Hackney	def.	Justin Robbins	TKO (punches)	3	2:12
Flyweight	Bill Friday	def.	Ken Porter	Technical Submission (guillotine choke)	3	4:28
Women's Flyweight	Hannah Zeciri	def.	Florina Meatu-Moeller	Decision (unanimous)	3	3:00	(Note: Amateur bout.)
Middleweight	Josh Reed	def.	Jordan Casterline	TKO (punches)	2	0:42	(Note: Amateur bout.)
Catchweight (150 lbs)	Aaron Goldfield	def.	Fernando Andrade	Decision (unanimous)	3	3:00	(Note: Amateur bout.)

== See also ==
- Titan Fighting Championships
- List of Titan FC events
- Titan FC events
