= Matt Bessette =

American mixed martial artist

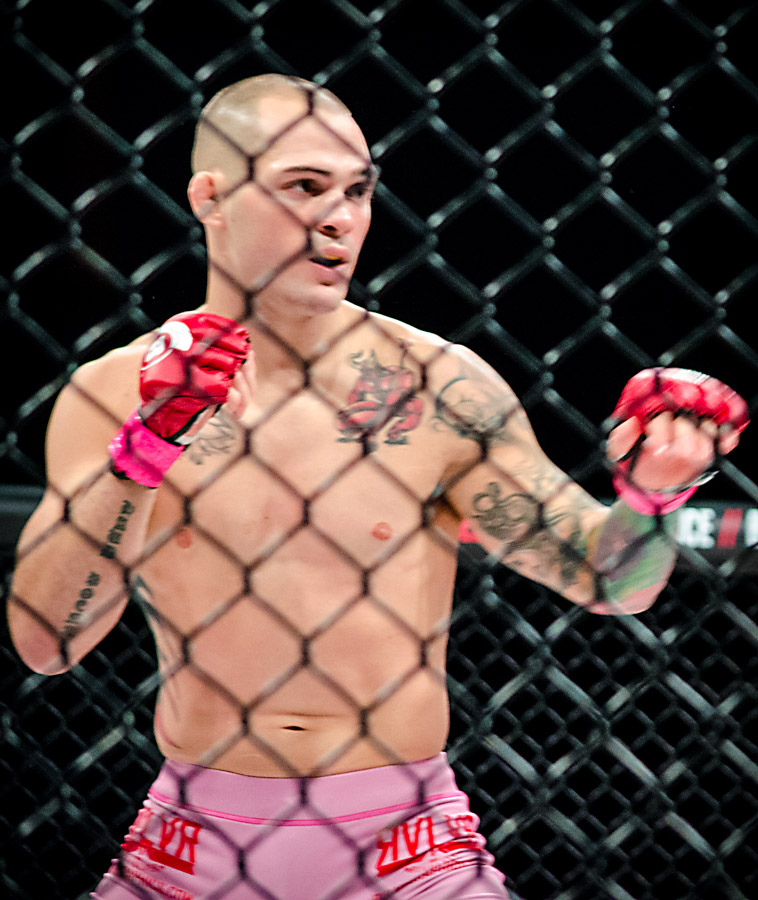
- Bessette in 2015
- Born: Matthew James Bessette; December 28, 1984 (age 41); Hartford, Connecticut, United States
- Other names: The Mangler
- Nationality: American
- Height: 5 ft 10 in (1.78 m)
- Weight: 145 lb (66 kg; 10.4 st)
- Division: Lightweight; Featherweight
- Reach: 70 in (178 cm)
- Stance: Orthodox
- Fighting out of: Hartford, Connecticut, United States
- Team: Underdog Brazilian Jiu-Jitsu Ascension Athletics
- Trainer: Stand-up: Russell Leak; BJJ: Rafael Quinones
- Rank: Black belt in Brazilian Jiu-Jitsu under Rafael Formiga; Brown belt in Judo
- Years active: 2007–2021

Mixed martial arts record
- Total: 35
- Wins: 25
- By knockout: 8
- By submission: 9
- By decision: 8
- Losses: 10
- By knockout: 1
- By submission: 1
- By decision: 7
- By disqualification: 1

Other information
- University: University of Hartford
- Notable school: Stafford High School
- Mixed martial arts record from Sherdog

Matthew James Bessette (born December 28, 1984) is a retired American mixed martial artist. A professional competitor since 2007, he has also competed for Bellator and the Ultimate Fighting Championship.

== Background ==
Bessette was born in Hartford, Connecticut. He was diagnosed with leukemia on August 13, 1988 at the age of three and was hospitalized for it. The doctors gave him 50% chance of survival, but became more optimistic after the initial treatments, which reduced significantly the leukemic cells. Bessette also developed asthma at an early age, although that never prevented him from competing in sports such as baseball, basketball, soccer, and football. After graduating from Stafford High School in 2003, Bessette attended the University of Hartford. While still in the university, he was introduced to mixed martial arts at the age of 22 and graduated in 2007 with a Bachelor of Science degree.

In June 2016, Bessette opened Ascension Athletics in Bristol, Connecticut.

== Mixed martial arts career ==
=== Early career ===
Bessette started his professional career in 2007. He fought mainly for Connecticut-based promotion Reality Fighting. Bessette faced Anthony Kaponis on October 9, 2010 at Reality Fighting: Eruption for the vacant lightweight title. He defeated Kaponis via split decision in a five-round bout. Bessette was set to make his first title defense against Joe Proctor on October 8, 2011 at Reality Fighting: Gonzaga vs. Porter. He lost his title via unanimous decision after five rounds.

=== Bellator MMA ===
In 2012, Bessette signed with Bellator. Bessette made his promotional debut against Saul Almeida on March 30, 2012 at Bellator 63. He won via unanimous decision (30-27, 30-27, 29-28). Bessette faced The Ultimate Fighter 12 competitor Paul Barrow on November 16, 2012 at Bellator 81. He won via unanimous decision (29-28, 30-27, 30-27). Bessette faced Nick Piedmont on September 7, 2013 at Bellator 98. He won via knockout early in the first round.

Bessette faced Diego Nunes in the quarterfinal match of Bellator Season Ten Featherweight Tournament on February 28, 2014 at Bellator 110. He won the back-and-forth fight via split decision. Bessette faced Daniel Weichel in the tournament semifinals at Bellator 114 on March 28, 2014. He lost the fight via unanimous decision.

Bessette faced Scott Cleve on September 5, 2014 at Bellator 123. He lost the fight via unanimous decision. Bessette faced Josh LaBerge at Bellator 134 on February 27, 2015. He won the fight due to a doctor stoppage between the second and third rounds.

After a two fight stint with CES MMA, Bessette returned to Bellator and faced Kevin Roddy at Bellator 144 on October 23, 2015. He won via submission with a heel hook in the first round. Bessette faced Keith Richardson at Bellator 153 on April 22, 2016. He won in the second round due to a doctor stoppage.

=== CES MMA ===
Bessette made his promotional debut on June 12, 2015 in the co-main event of CES MMA 29 against Khama Worthy. He won via knockout in the second round. He returned for CES MMA 30 on August 14, 2015 against Lenny Wheeler. He lost via knockout in the first round, making it the first time in his career that he was knocked out. After a return to Bellator, Bessette returned to CES MMA on March 11, 2016 to face Taurean Bogguess at CES MMA 33. He won via submission with a triangle choke in the first round. He was originally scheduled to fight Tito Jones, but Jones backed out three days before the event due to injury.

Bessette returned to CES MMA on June 10, 2016 to face Jairo Soares at CES MMA 36, but Soares was pulled the day before the fight for testing positive for performance enhancing drugs. Soares's replacement was Ran Weathers, whom Bessette defeated via submission in the first round.

Featherweight Champion At CES MMA 37: Summer Gold, Bessette was set to take on Stephen Cerventes for the vacant CES Featherweight Championship, but he was replaced by Joe Pingitore. Bessette won the featherweight belt with a heel hook submission victory in the second round. Bessette successfully defended his title with a TKO win over Kevin Croom at CES MMA 41. At CES MMA 44, Bessette was scheduled to fight Jeremy Spoon but he was replaced with Rey Trujillo. Bessette again successfully defended his championship with a TKO victory.

=== Dana White Tuesday Night Contender Series ===
On June 22, 2017, it was announced that Bessette would headline the July 11 premiere event of the Dana White Tuesday Night Contender Series against Kurt Holobaugh. He lost the fight via knockout in the first round. Five days after the fight, it was announced that Kurt Holobaugh used an illegal method of hydrating with an IV, the fight would be declared a no contest.

=== Ultimate Fighting Championship ===
In his UFC debut, Bessette replaced Arnold Allen against Enrique Barzola at UFC 220 on January 20, 2018. at UFC 220 on January 20, 2018 . He lost the fight via unanimous decision.

Bessette faced Steven Peterson on July 6, 2018 at The Ultimate Fighter 27 Finale. He lost the fight via split decision.

On January 8, 2019 it was reported that Bessette was removed from the UFC roster.

=== Post-UFC career ===
After being released from the UFC, Bessette returned to CES MMA, facing Tim Dooling in his promotional return at CES MMA 55 on March 29, 2019. Bessette won the back-and-forth fight via unanimous decision.

He then faced Charles Cheeks III for the vacant CES Featherweight Championship at CES MMA 60 on January 24, 2020. Bessette won the fight via knockout in the third round, claiming the championship for the second time in his career.

After four years away from Bellator MMA, Bessette returned to face Jeremy Kennedy at Bellator 253 on November 19, 2020. He lost the fight by unanimous decision.

Bessette was initially scheduled to fight for the vacant CES lightweight championship bout on September 17, 2021 at CES 64 against Bruce Boyington. However, Boyington withdrew from the bout and was replaced by Ryan Dela Cruz. He won the bout and the title via reverse triangle in the third round. After the bout, Bessette announced his retirement from MMA.

== Championships and accomplishments ==
=== Mixed martial arts ===
- CES MMA
  - CES MMA Featherweight Championship (Two times)
    - Two successful title defenses (first reign)
  - CES MMA Lightweight Championship (One time)
- Reality Fighting
  - RF Lightweight Championship (One time)
- Global Fight League
  - GFL Lightweight Championship (One time)

== Mixed martial arts record ==
Professional record breakdown
36 matches	25 wins	10 losses
By knockout	8	1
By submission	9	1
By decision	8	7
By disqualification	0	1
No contests	1	

Res.	Record	Opponent	Method	Event	Date	Round	Time	Location	Notes
Win	25–10 (1)	Ryan Dela Cruz	Submission (reverse triangle choke)	CES MMA 64: Bessette vs. Dela Cruz	September 17, 2021	3	4:48	Hartford, Connecticut, United States	Won the vacant CES Lightweight Championship.
Loss	24–10 (1)	Jeremy Kennedy	Decision (unanimous)	Bellator 253	November 19, 2020	3	5:00	Uncasville, Connecticut, United States	
Win	24–9 (1)	Charles Cheeks III	KO (punch)	CES MMA 60: Bessette vs. Cheeks	January 24, 2020	3	4:01	Lincoln, Rhode Island, United States	Won the vacant CES Featherweight Championship.
Win	23–9 (1)	Tim Dooling	Decision (unanimous)	CES MMA 55: Wells vs De Jesus	March 29, 2019	3	5:00	Hartford, Connecticut, United States	
Loss	22–9 (1)	Steven Peterson	Decision (split)	The Ultimate Fighter: Undefeated Finale	July 6, 2018	3	5:00	Las Vegas, Nevada, United States	
Loss	22–8 (1)	Enrique Barzola	Decision (unanimous)	UFC 220	January 20, 2018	3	5:00	Boston, Massachusetts, United States	
NC	22–7 (1)	Kurt Holobaugh	NC (overturned)	Dana White's Contender Series 1	July 11, 2017	1	2:59	Las Vegas, Nevada, United States	Originally a KO (punch) win for Holobaugh; overturned due to his unlawful use of an IV before the fight.
Win	22–7	Rey Trujillo	TKO (doctor stoppage)	CES MMA 44: Bessette vs. Trujillo	May 12, 2017	2	5:00	Lincoln, Rhode Island, United States	Defended the CES Featherweight Championship.
Win	21–7	Kevin Croom	TKO (punches)	CES MMA 41: Bessette vs. Croom	January 27, 2017	3	0:32	Lincoln, Rhode Island, United States	Defended the CES Featherweight Championship.
Win	20–7	Joe Pingitore	Submission (heel hook)	CES MMA 37: Summer Gold	August 12, 2016	2	4:38	Lincoln, Rhode Island, United States	Won the vacant CES Featherweight Championship.
Win	19–7	Ran Weathers	Submission (guillotine choke)	CES MMA 36: Andrews vs. Muro	June 10, 2016	1	4:50	Lincoln, Rhode Island, United States	Lightweight bout.
Win	18–7	Keith Richardson	TKO (doctor stoppage)	Bellator 153	April 22, 2016	2	3:14	Uncasville, Connecticut, United States	
Win	17–7	Taurean Bogguess	Submission (triangle choke)	CES MMA 33: Soukhamthath vs. Nordby	March 11, 2016	1	2:41	Lincoln, Rhode Island, United States	Catchweight (150 lbs) bout.
Win	16–7	Kevin Roddy	Submission (heel hook)	Bellator 144	October 23, 2015	1	3:47	Uncasville, Connecticut, United States	
Loss	15–7	Lenny Wheeler	KO (punches)	CES MMA 30: Felix vs. Lane	August 14, 2015	1	0:39	Lincoln, Rhode Island, United States	Catchweight (150 lbs) bout.
Win	15–6	Khama Worthy	KO (punch)	CES MMA 29: O'Neil vs. Steele	June 12, 2015	2	2:42	Lincoln, Rhode Island, United States	
Win	14–6	Josh LaBerge	TKO (doctor stoppage)	Bellator 134	February 27, 2015	2	5:00	Uncasville, Connecticut, United States	
Loss	13–6	Scott Cleve	Decision (unanimous)	Bellator 123	September 5, 2014	3	5:00	Uncasville, Connecticut, United States	
Loss	13–5	Daniel Weichel	Decision (unanimous)	Bellator 114	March 28, 2014	3	5:00	West Valley City, Utah, United States	Bellator Season 10 Featherweight Tournament Semifinal.
Win	13–4	Diego Nunes	Decision (split)	Bellator 110	February 28, 2014	3	5:00	Uncasville, Connecticut, United States	Bellator Season 10 Featherweight Tournament Quarterfinal.
Win	12–4	Nick Piedmont	KO (punches)	Bellator 98	September 7, 2013	1	1:41	Uncasville, Connecticut, United States	Featherweight debut.
Win	11–4	Jeff Anderson	Decision (unanimous)	Reality Fighting: New Year's Bash	January 5, 2013	3	5:00	Uncasville, Connecticut, United States	Catchweight (150 lbs) bout.
Win	10–4	Paul Barrow	Decision (unanimous)	Bellator 81	November 16, 2012	3	5:00	Kingston, Rhode Island, United States	
Win	9–4	Aniss Alhajjajy	Decision (unanimous)	Reality Fighting: Naples vs. Lee	September 22, 2012	3	5:00	Uncasville, Connecticut, United States	
Loss	8–4	Andres Jeudi	DQ (illegal upkick)	Reality Fighting: Mohegan Sun	June 2, 2012	3	4:43	Uncasville, Connecticut, United States	
Win	8–3	Saul Almeida	Decision (unanimous)	Bellator 63	March 30, 2012	3	5:00	Uncasville, Connecticut, United States	
Loss	7–3	Joe Proctor	Decision (unanimous)	Reality Fighting: Gonzaga vs. Porter	October 8, 2011	5	5:00	Uncasville, Connecticut, United States	Lost the Reality Fighting Lightweight Championship.
Win	7–2	John Benoit	Submission (guillotine choke)	GFL 10: Benoit vs. Bessette	April 15, 2011	2	4:59	Lowell, Massachusetts, United States	Won the GFL Lightweight Championship.
Win	6–2	Anthony Kaponis	Decision (split)	Reality Fighting: Eruption	October 9, 2010	5	5:00	Plymouth, Massachusetts, United States	Won the vacant Reality Fighting Lightweight Championship.
Win	5–2	Andrew Amaral	Submission (guillotine choke)	Reality Fighting: Ignition	July 17, 2010	2	3:30	Plymouth, Massachusetts, United States	
Win	4–2	Andrew Carron	Decision (unanimous)	Reality Fighting: Ferocity	November 7, 2009	3	4:00	Plymouth, Massachusetts, United States	
Loss	3–2	Chris Chappell	Submission (guillotine choke)	FFP: Untamed 26	February 28, 2009	3	2:13	Westport, Massachusetts, United States	
Win	3–1	Jeff Camera	TKO (punches)	Reality Fighting: Collision	July 19, 2008	2	2:18	Plymouth, Massachusetts, United States	
Win	2–1	Andres Lebron	Submission (rear-naked choke)	Reality Fighting: Nightmare	April 12, 2008	2	2:45	Plymouth, Massachusetts, United States	
Loss	1–1	Bill Jones	Decision (split)	Reality Fighting: Annihilation	January 19, 2008	3	3:00	Plymouth, Massachusetts, United States	
Win	1–0	Chris Correira	Submission (guillotine choke)	Reality Fighting: Invictus	September 15, 2007	3	N/A	Concord, New Hampshire, United States	

== See also ==
- List of current Bellator fighters
- List of male mixed martial artists
