= Kin Moy =

American mixed martial arts fighter

- Born: June 26, 1990 (age 36); United States, United States
- Other names: Kong
- Height: 5 ft 5 in (1.65 m)
- Weight: 135 lb (61 kg; 9.6 st)
- Division: Bantamweight; Featherweight
- Reach: 65 in (165 cm)
- Fighting out of: Cambridge, Massachusetts
- Team: Citadel Martial Arts & Fitness
- Years active: 2009 - current

Mixed martial arts record
- Total: 16
- Wins: 12
- By knockout: 4
- By submission: 6
- By decision: 2
- Losses: 4
- By knockout: 2
- By decision: 2

Other information
- Mixed martial arts record from Sherdog

Kin Moy is an American mixed martial artist. He competed in the bantamweight and featherweight divisions.

== Mixed martial arts record ==
Professional record breakdown
16 matches	12 wins	4 losses
By knockout	4	2
By submission	6	0
By decision	2	2

Res.	Record	Opponent	Method	Event	Date	Round	Time	Location	Notes
Win	12–4	Tateki Matsuda	Decision (unanimous)	Cage Titans 47	January 25, 2020	3	5:00	Plymouth, Massachusetts, United States	
Win	11–4	Shawn Rall	KO (punches)	Cage Titans 45	August 24, 2019	1	1:50	Plymouth, Massachusetts, United States	
Win	10–4	Raymond Yanez	TKO (punches)	Cage Titans 44	June 15, 2019	1	2:01	Plymouth, Massachusetts, United States	
Loss	9–4	Jay Perrin	Decision (unanimous)	Cage Titans 42	January 26, 2019	5	5:00	Plymouth, Massachusetts, United States	For the Cage Titans FC Bantamweight Championship.
Win	9–3	Patrick Corrigan	Submission (rear-naked choke)	Cage Titans 41	November 3, 2018	3	1:08	Plymouth, Massachusetts, United States	
Loss	8–3	Andre Soukhamthath	TKO (knee and punches)	CES MMA 37	August 12, 2016	2	2:32	Lincoln, Rhode Island, United States	For the CES Bantamweight Championship.
Win	8–2	Walter Smith-Cotito	Submission (rear-naked choke)	Bellator 144	October 23, 2015	3	3:53	Uncasville, Connecticut, United States	
Win	7–2	Blair Tugman	Submission (triangle choke)	Bellator 140	July 17, 2015	3	3:01	Uncasville, Connecticut, United States	Catchweight (138 lb) bout; Moy missed weight.
Loss	6–2	Joey Gomez	TKO (punches)	Classic Entertainment and Sports: CES MMA 28	March 13, 2015	1	1:29	Lincoln, Rhode Island, United States	
Win	6–1	Fernando Perez	TKO (punches)	CFX 26: Cage Fighting Xtreme 26	December 13, 2014	1	2:21	Taunton, Massachusetts, United States	Catchweight (140 lb) bout.
Loss	5–1	Steve Garcia	Decision (Split)	Bellator 123	September 5, 2014	3	5:00	Uncasville, Connecticut, United States	
Win	5–0	Andre Soukhamthath	Decision (unanimous)	Classic Entertainment and Sports: CES MMA 21	January 24, 2014	3	5:00	Lincoln, Rhode Island, United States	
Win	4–0	Kurt Chase-Patrick	Submission	VCS: Victory Combat Sports	September 28, 2013	1	1:00	Dorchester, Massachusetts, United States	
Win	3–0	Dinis Paiva	Submission (guillotine choke)	CES MMA: Path to Destruction	April 12, 2013	2	0:57	Lincoln, Rhode Island, United States	
Win	2–0	Hassan Mahmood	TKO (punches)	CFX 22: Winter Blast	February 23, 2013	2	1:27	Plymouth, Massachusetts, United States	Bantamweight debut.
Win	1–0	Joshua Beauparlant	Submission (armbar)	Cage Titans 12: Glory	November 10, 2012	1	2:45	Boston, Massachusetts, United States	Catchweight (140 lb) bout.

=== Mixed martial arts amateur record ===
Amateur record breakdown		
7 matches	6 wins	1 loss
By knockout	2	1
By submission	2	0
By decision	2	0

Res.	Record	Opponent	Method	Event	Date	Round	Time	Location	Notes
Win	6–1	Luis Ramos	Technical Submission (triangle choke)	AFO: The Perfect Storm	September 16, 2011	2	1:47	Revere, Massachusetts, United States	
Win	5–1	Matt Doherty	Decision (unanimous)	Cage Titans 5: Vendetta	June 25, 2011	3	3:00	Boston, Massachusetts, United States	
Loss	4–1	Rico DiSciullo	TKO (punches)	AFO: Night of Champions 3	April 22, 2011	1	2:21	Mansfield, Massachusetts, United States	
Win	4–0	Dat Tran	Decision (unanimous)	AFO: Summer Brawl	June 25, 2010	3	3:00	Mansfield, Massachusetts, United States	
Win	3–0	Mike Campanella	KO (head kick)	AFO: Last Man Standing 2	February 26, 2010	1	1:41	Randolph, Massachusetts, United States	
Win	2–0	Jesse Penny	TKO (punches)	AFO: Clash of the Titans	August 21, 2009	2	1:17	Braintree, Massachusetts, United States	
Win	1–0	Theo Desjardin	Submission (rear-naked choke)	AFO: Last Man Standing	February 21, 2009	1	N/A	Braintree, Massachusetts, United States	

== See also ==
- List of male mixed martial artists
