= Saul Almeida =

American mixed martial arts fighter (born 1992)

- Born: June 4, 1992 (age 34); Guanhães, Minas Gerais, Brazil
- Other names: The Spider
- Nationality: Brazilian-American
- Height: 6 ft 1 in (1.85 m)
- Weight: 155.7 lb (70.6 kg; 11.12 st)
- Division: Featherweight; Lightweight; Super Middleweight; Light Heavyweight; Cruiserweight
- Reach: 75.0 in (191 cm)
- Fighting out of: Framingham, Massachusetts, United States
- Team: Sityodtong Boston
- Rank: Black belt in Karate; Black belt in Brazilian Jiu-Jitsu
- Years active: 2008–present

Professional boxing record
- Total: 13
- Wins: 1
- By knockout: 1
- Losses: 11
- By knockout: 4
- Draws: 1

Mixed martial arts record
- Total: 35
- Wins: 20
- By knockout: 2
- By submission: 5
- By decision: 13
- Losses: 14
- By knockout: 3
- By submission: 2
- By decision: 9
- No contests: 1

Other information
- Mixed martial arts record from Sherdog

Saul Almeida (born June 4, 1992) is a Brazilian-American professional boxer and mixed martial artist. A professional mixed martial artist since 2008, Almeida has fought in Bellator, World Series of Fighting, Absolute Championship Berkut, and CES MMA.

== Background ==
Almeida was born in Brazil where he lived until moving to Boston, Massachusetts at the age of eight. Almeida began training in karate and earned the rank of black belt, at the age of ten, Almeida began training in Brazilian jiu-jitsu. In high school, Almeida competed in wrestling and also trained in boxing.

== Mixed martial arts career ==
=== Early career ===
Almeida made his professional debut in October 2008, defeating Iann de Oliveira via unanimous decision. He would then win his next 6 bouts, earning them mostly by decision before losing to Pete Jeffrey via guillotine choke submission at CES MMA: First Blood on September 17, 2010. Almeida then won his next two bouts, defeating Bobby Reardanz and Cody Stevens both by unanimous decision before making his Bellator debut.

=== Bellator MMA ===
Almeida made his Bellator debut on August 20, 2011 at Bellator 48. He faced Tateki Matsuda and won via unanimous decision.

Almeida next faced Matt Bessette at Bellator 63 on March 30, 2012. He lost the fight via unanimous decision.

Almeida was expected to face UFC veteran Kurt Pellegrino at Bellator 108 on November 15, 2013. However, Pellegrino pulled out of the fight due to injury. Almeida was removed from the card as a result.

Almeida instead fought outside of Bellator for his next three fights.

Almeida faced Goiti Yamauchi at Bellator 109 on November 22, 2013. He lost the fight via knockout in the first round.

Almeida faced Andrew Fisher in a Bellator season ten featherweight tournament alternate bout on February 28, 2014 at Bellator 110. He won the fight via unanimous decision.

=== Independent promotions ===
After leaving Bellator, with a 2-2 record in the organisation, Almeida has gone 3-0, with two finishes, on the local circuit.

=== World Series of Fighting ===
Almeida made his WSOF debut against Chris Foster on April 10, 2015 at WSOF 20. He won the fight via split decision.

Almeida returned to the promotion on October 17, 2015 at WSOF 24. He faced Alexandre de Almeida and lost the fight via submission in the first round. For his third fight, Almeida faced Bruce Boyington at WSOF 31 on June 17, 2016, and lost via split decision.

=== Other promotions ===
Almeida is scheduled to face Kevin Lee on November 15, 2024 at Gamebred Bareknuckle MMA 8.

== Professional boxing ==
Almeida made his professional boxing debut in 2012.

== Mixed martial arts record ==
Professional record breakdown
35 matches	20 wins	14 losses
By knockout	2	3
By submission	5	2
By decision	13	9
No contests	1	

Res.	Record	Opponent	Method	Event	Date	Round	Time	Location	Notes
Loss	20–14 (1)	Paulo Machado	Decision (split)	Gamebred Bareknuckle MMA 10	May 1, 2026	3	5:00	Miami, Florida, United States	
Loss	20–13 (1)	Nick Fiore	TKO (punches)	Combat Zone 85	August 17, 2024	2	1:46	Manchester, New Hampshire, United States	For the vacant Combat Zone Lightweight Championship.
Loss	20–12 (1)	Joe Giannetti	Decision (unanimous)	Cage Titans 57	January 7, 2023	5	5:00	Plymouth, Massachusetts, United States	For the Cage Titans Lightweight Championship.
Loss	20–11 (1)	Sean Soriano	KO (punches)	CES MMA 57	July 26, 2019	1	1:22	Lincoln, Rhode Island, United States	Return to Lightweight.
Win	20–10 (1)	Stacey Anderson	TKO (punches)	AMMO Fight League 5	October 13, 2018	3	2:51	West Springfield, Massachusetts, United States	Catchweight (160 lb) bout.
Loss	19–10 (1)	Andy Main	Decision (unanimous)	LFA 49	September 9, 2018	3	5:00	Atlantic City, New Jersey, United States	
Loss	19–9 (1)	Adlan Bataev	Decision (unanimous)	ACB 84	April 7, 2018	3	5:00	Bratislava, Slovakia	
NC	19–8 (1)	Pedro Gonzalez	NC (overturned)	CES MMA 45	August 11, 2017	5	5:00	Lincoln, Rhode Island, United States	For the interim CES MMA Featherweight Championship. Originally a unanimous decision win for Gonzalez; overturned after he tested positive a banned substance.
Win	19–8	Josh LaBerge	Submission (rear-naked choke)	CES MMA 42	March 31, 2017	3	4:50	Lincoln, Rhode Island, United States	Lightweight bout.
Loss	18–8	Manny Bermudez	Decision (split)	CES MMA 39: O'Neill vs. Santiago	November 4, 2016	3	5:00	Plymouth, Massachusetts, United States	
Loss	18–7	Bruce Boyington	Decision (split)	WSOF 31	June 17, 2016	3	5:00	Mashantucket, Connecticut, United States	Lightweight bout.
Loss	18–6	Alexandre de Almeida	Submission (rear-naked choke)	WSOF 24	October 17, 2015	1	1:23	Mashantucket, Connecticut, United States	Catchweight (148 lb) bout; Almeida missed weight.
Win	18–5	Chris Foster	Decision (split)	WSOF 20	April 10, 2015	3	5:00	Mashantucket, Connecticut, United States	
Win	17–5	Franklin Isabel	TKO (punches)	Cage Fighting Xtreme 25	September 26, 2014	1	N/A	Boston, Massachusetts, United States	Catchweight (160 lb) bout.
Win	16–5	Andres Jeudi	Decision (unanimous)	CES MMA 24	June 27, 2014	3	5:00	Lincoln, Rhode Island, United States	Lightweight bout.
Win	15–5	Wayne Harnois	Submission (rear-naked choke)	Big Six Entertainment: The Carnage in Canton	May 3, 2014	1	4:14	Canton, Massachusetts, United States	
Win	14–5	Andrew Fisher	Decision (unanimous)	Bellator 110	February 28, 2014	3	5:00	Uncasville, Connecticut, United States	Bellator Season Ten Featherweight Tournament Alternate bout.
Loss	13–5	Goiti Yamauchi	KO (punches)	Bellator 109	November 22, 2013	1	2:04	Bethlehem, Pennsylvania, United States	Catchweight (152.3 lb) bout; Yamauchi missed weight.
Win	13–4	Aguilano Brandão	Submission (brabo choke)	Combat Zone 45	September 6, 2013	2	0:50	Salem, New Hampshire, United States	Catchweight (165 lb) bout.
Loss	12–4	Rob Font	Decision (unanimous)	CES MMA 15	February 1, 2013	3	5:00	Lincoln, Rhode Island, United States	
Loss	12–3	Calvin Kattar	Decision (unanimous)	CES MMA 13	October 6, 2012	3	5:00	Providence, Rhode Island, United States	Return to Featherweight.
Loss	12–2	Matt Bessette	Decision (unanimous)	Bellator 63	March 30, 2012	3	5:00	Uncasville, Connecticut, United States	
Win	12–1	Jeff Anderson	Decision (unanimous)	CES MMA 9	February 3, 2012	3	5:00	Lincoln, Rhode Island, United States	
Win	11–1	Kevin Roddy	Decision (split)	CES MMA 8	November 18, 2011	3	5:00	Lincoln, Rhode Island, United States	Catchweight (150 lb) bout.
Win	10–1	Tateki Matsuda	Decision (unanimous)	Bellator 48	August 20, 2011	3	5:00	Uncasville, Connecticut, United States	Featherweight bout.
Win	9–1	Cody Stevens	Decision (unanimous)	CES MMA 6	June 10, 2011	3	5:00	Lincoln, Rhode Island, United States	Catchweight (157 lb) bout.
Win	8–1	Bobby Reardanz	Decision (unanimous)	CES MMA 4	February 25, 2011	3	5:00	Lincoln, Rhode Island, United States	
Loss	7–1	Pete Jeffrey	Technical Submission (guillotine choke)	CES MMA 1	September 17, 2010	3	0:26	Lincoln, Rhode Island, United States	Lightweight debut.
Win	7–0	Chris Grandmaison	Decision (unanimous)	Xtreme Championship Fight League 1	February 6, 2010	5	5:00	Marlborough, Massachusetts, United States	
Win	6–0	Joe Manzello	Decision (split)	New England Cage Fighting: Wartown Beatdown 4	November 13, 2009	3	5:00	Worcester, Massachusetts, United States	Won the vacant NECF Featherweight Championship.
Win	5–0	Kevin Corrigan	Decision (unanimous)	World CF 8	September 26, 2009	2	5:00	Wilmington, Massachusetts, United States	
Win	4–0	Dan O'Keefe	Submission (Peruvian necktie)	World CF 7	June 27, 2009	1	1:16	Wilmington, Massachusetts, United States	
Win	3–0	Jacob Irons	Submission (forearm choke)	ICE Fighter: Hostile Takeover	April 10, 2009	1	1:43	Worcester, Massachusetts, United States	
Win	2–0	Steve Butler	Decision (unanimous)	Submit to Glory: Defiance	February 7, 2009	3	5:00	Revere, Massachusetts, United States	
Win	1–0	Iann de Oliveira	Decision (unanimous)	World Fighting League 22	October 18, 2008	3	5:00	Revere, Massachusetts, United States	Featherweight debut.

== Boxing Record ==
16 fights	2 wins	13 losses
By knockout	2	4
By decision	0	9
Draws	1	

Result	Record	Opponent	Type	Round, time	Date	Location	Notes
Loss	2-13-1	Vince Mosca	UD	4(4), 3:00	February 28, 2026	Baltimore, Maryland	
Win	2-12-1	Nicholas Pecora	KO/TKO	2(4), 2:33	November 8, 2025	Portland, Maine	
Loss	1-12-1	Martin Brown	UD	4(4), 3:00	April 25, 2025	Clearwater, Florida	Return to Light heavyweight
Loss	1-11-1	Jorge Luis Moracen Sotolongo	KO/TKO	2(6), 2:20	December 1, 2023	Miami, Florida	
Loss	1-10-1	James Perkins	UD	6(6), 3:00	November 10, 2023	Bridgewater, Massachusetts	
Loss	1-9-1	James Maner	UD	4(4), 3:00	August 5, 2023	Worcester, Massachusetts	Return to Super middleweight
Loss	1-8-1	Yildo Depestre	UD	4(4), 3:00	June 10, 2023	Miami, Florida	
Loss	1-7-1	Sanny Duversonne	KO/TKO	4(6), 2:38	April 22, 2023	Tampa, Florida	Return to Light heavyweight
Loss	1-6-1	Darin Austin	UD	6(6), 3:00	March 18, 2023	Jonesboro, Georgia	
Win	1-5-1	Kevin Lewis	RTD	3(4), 3:00	February 26, 2022	Framingham, Massachusetts	Return to Cruiserweight
Loss	0-5-1	Steven Sumpter	KO/TKO	4(4), 0:54	June 26, 2021	Derry, New Hampshire	Light heavyweight bout
Draw	0-4-1	Danny Pastrana	MD	4(4), 3:00	May 8, 2021	Orlando, Florida	Cruiserweight debut
Loss	0-4	Manny Woods	UD	6(6), 3:00	April 17, 2021	Derry, New Hampshire	
Loss	0-3	Josniel Castro	UD	4(4), 3:00	November 14, 2020	Derry, New Hampshire	Return to Super middleweight
Loss	0-2	Edet Mkpanam	UD	4(4), 3:00	August 29, 2020	Derry, New Hampshire	Light heavyweight debut
Loss	0-1	Elvis Figueroa	KO/TKO	1(4), 2:32	April 28, 2018	Plainville, Massachusetts	Super middleweight debut
