= Kevin Croom =

American mixed martial arts fighter

- Born: July 15, 1987 (age 39); Columbia, Missouri, U.S.
- Other names: Crash
- Height: 5 ft 11 in (1.80 m)
- Weight: 155 lb (70 kg; 11 st 1 lb)
- Division: Lightweight; Featherweight; Bantamweight
- Reach: 73 in (185 cm)
- Fighting out of: Kansas City, Missouri
- Team: Glory MMA & Fitness
- Rank: Brown belt in Brazilian Jiu-Jitsu
- Years active: 2009–present

Mixed martial arts record
- Total: 39
- Wins: 23
- By knockout: 6
- By submission: 11
- By decision: 6
- Losses: 15
- By knockout: 5
- By submission: 4
- By decision: 6
- No contests: 1

Other information
- Mixed martial arts record from Sherdog

Kevin Croom (born July 15, 1987) is an American mixed martial artist currently competing in the Lightweight division. A professional since 2009, he has fought in the UFC, Bellator, Titan FC, the RFA, the LFA, and CES MMA.

== Mixed martial arts career ==
=== Early career ===
Croom has fought for multiple MMA promotions during his professional MMA career, including Legacy Fighting Alliance and Bellator MMA. Croom has 16 stoppages in his total of 21 professional victories.

Croom faced Brian Davidson at Bellator 26 on August 26, 2010. Davidson lost via rear-naked choke submission in the second round.

In his seventh fight, Croom faced Justin Gaethje in his professional debut on August 20, 2011. Gaethje won the fight in the first round via KO due to a slam after Croom attempted a submission.

Croom faced Bryan Goldsby at Titan FC 27 on February 28, 2014. He won by unanimous decision.

Croom fought for the CES MMA Featherweight Championship against reigning champion Matt Bessette at CES MMA 41, losing via TKO.

Croom defeated Darrick Minner via TKO in the second round at LFA 48.

Croom faced John Teixeira at Bellator 218 on March 22, 2019. He lost the fight via unanimous decision.

Croom tapped out Charles Bennett via rear-naked choke in round one at FAC 1 to pick up submission victory number 10 as a professional.

At Bellator 239, Croom took on Adil Benijilany and defeated him via split decision.

In the fight before getting a UFC contract, Croom faced Anderson Hutchinson, who was later in September arrested for having sex with a 17-year-old female boxing student, on August 14, 2020, at Fighting Alliance Championship 3 for the FAC Featherweight Championship. Croom won the championship fight via unanimous decision.

=== Ultimate Fighting Championship ===
Croom, replacing Giga Chikadze as a COVID replacement, was scheduled to face Alex Caceres on August 29, 2020, at UFC Fight Night: Smith vs. Rakić The following day, Croom was removed after also testing positive for COVID and replaced by fellow newcomer Austin Springer.

Croom made his UFC debut, as an injury fill in for Matt Frevola, against Roosevelt Roberts on September 12, 2020, at UFC Fight Night: Waterson vs. Hill. Croom won the fight via a guillotine choke in round one. This fight earned him the Performance of the Night award. After the fight, Croom said on Twitter that he had only $64 in his bank account before the fight.

On November 4, it was announced by the Nevada State Athletic Commission (NSAC) that the fight with Roosevelt Roberts would be overturned to a no contest, after Croom tested positive for marijuana. Croom was suspended for 4 1/2 months and had to pay a fine of $1,800.

Croom faced Alex Caceres on February 27, 2021, at UFC Fight Night: Rozenstruik vs. Gane. He lost the bout via unanimous decision.

Croom was scheduled to face Marcelo Rojo on August 28, 2021, at UFC on ESPN 30. However, Croom was removed from the bout in mid-August for undisclosed reasons.

Croom faced Brian Kelleher, replacing Saidyokub Kakhramonov, on January 15, 2022, at UFC on ESPN 32. He lost the fight via unanimous decision.

Croom faced Alateng Heili at UFC on ESPN 34 on April 16, 2022. He lost the fight via TKO early into the first round.

In May 2022, it was reported that Croom was released from UFC.

=== Post UFC ===
In his first bout after his UFC release, Croom faced Brad Robinson on September 10, 2022 at Synergy FC: Kansas City Fight Night. He won the bout via majority decision.

== Bare-knuckle boxing ==
=== Bare Knuckle Fighting Championship ===
Croom made his BKFC debut on November 18, 2022 at BKFC 33 against Sean Wilson and won by knockout in the second round.

Croom faced Chevvy Bridges on February 17, 2023 at BKFC KnuckleMania 3 and won the bout by first round knockout.

Croom faced Tony Soto on October 20, 2023 at BKFC 52 and lost by unanimous decision. This fight earned him a Fight of the Night award.

Croom was scheduled to face Emeka Ifekandu on August 16, 2024 at BKFC Fight Night: Kansas City. However, the bout was pulled from the card for unknown reasons.

== Championships and achievements ==
=== Mixed martial arts ===
- Ultimate Fighting Championship
  - Performance of the Night (One time) vs. Roosevelt Roberts
- Fighting Alliance Championship
  - FAC Featherweight Championship (One Time)
- Shamrock Fighting Championships
  - SFC Bantamweight Championship (One Time)

=== Bare-knuckle boxing ===
- Bare Knuckle Fighting Championship
  - Fight of the Night (One time) vs. Tony Soto

== Mixed martial arts record ==
Professional record breakdown
39 matches	23 wins	15 losses
By knockout	6	5
By submission	11	4
By decision	6	6
No contests	1	

Res.	Record	Opponent	Method	Event	Date	Round	Time	Location	Notes
Win	23–15 (1)	Isaac Ware	Submission (arm-triangle choke)	Midwest Fight League 209	July 19, 2025	1	1:37	Boonville, Missouri, United States	Catchweight (165 lb) bout.
Win	22–15 (1)	Brad Robison	Decision (majority)	Synergy FC: Kansas City Fight Night	September 10, 2022	3	5:00	Kansas City, Kansas, United States	Return to Lightweight.
Loss	21–15 (1)	Alateng Heili	TKO (punches)	UFC on ESPN: Luque vs. Muhammad 2	April 16, 2022	1	0:47	Las Vegas, Nevada, United States	Bantamweight bout.
Loss	21–14 (1)	Brian Kelleher	Decision (unanimous)	UFC on ESPN: Kattar vs. Chikadze	January 15, 2022	3	5:00	Las Vegas, Nevada, United States	
Loss	21–13 (1)	Alex Caceres	Decision (unanimous)	UFC Fight Night: Rozenstruik vs. Gane	February 27, 2021	3	5:00	Las Vegas, Nevada, United States	
NC	21–12 (1)	Roosevelt Roberts	NC (overturned)	UFC Fight Night: Waterson vs. Hill	September 12, 2020	1	0:31	Las Vegas, Nevada, United States	Lightweight bout. Performance of the Night. Originally a submission (guillotine choke) win for Croom; overturned after he tested positive for marijuana.
Win	21–12	Anderson Hutchinson	Decision (unanimous)	FAC 3	August 14, 2020	5	5:00	Independence, Missouri, United States	Won the inaugural FAC Featherweight Championship.
Win	20–12	Adil Benjilany	Decision (split)	Bellator 239	February 21, 2020	3	5:00	Thackerville, Oklahoma, United States	
Win	19–12	Charles Bennett	Submission (rear-naked choke)	FAC 1	August 24, 2019	1	2:15	Independence, Missouri, United States	
Loss	18–12	John Macapá	Decision (unanimous)	Bellator 218	March 22, 2019	3	5:00	Thackerville, Oklahoma, United States	
Loss	18–11	Kamuela Kirk	Submission (triangle choke)	LFA 53	November 9, 2018	1	3:54	Phoenix, Arizona, United States	
Win	18–10	Darrick Minner	TKO (elbows)	LFA 48	September 7, 2018	2	2:10	Kearney, Nebraska, United States	
Loss	17–10	Nate Jennerman	Technical Submission (guillotine choke)	LFA 41	June 1, 2018	1	0:48	Prior Lake, Minnesota, United States	
Win	17–9	CJay Hunter	Submission (rear-naked choke)	Kansas City Fighting Alliance 27	February 17, 2018	3	1:16	Independence, Missouri, United States	
Loss	16–9	Matt Bessette	TKO (punches and kicks)	CES MMA 41	January 27, 2017	3	0:32	Lincoln, Rhode Island, United States	For the CES MMA Featherweight Championship.
Loss	16–8	Tatsuya Ando	Technical Submission (rear-naked choke)	Shooto 11/12	November 12, 2016	2	3:13	Tokyo, Japan	Bantamweight bout.
Win	16–7	Lenny Wheeler	TKO (punches)	Triumph FC 1	April 22, 2016	1	0:26	Edmonton, Alberta, Canada	
Loss	15–7	Rasul Mirzaev	TKO (punches)	Fight Nights Global 41	September 25, 2015	2	3:16	Kaspiysk, Russia	Return to Featherweight.
Win	15–6	Jacob Akin	KO (punch)	Shamrock FC: Shock	January 17, 2015	1	2:13	Kansas City, Missouri, United States	Won the vacant Shamrock FC Bantamweight Championship.
Loss	14–6	Jesse Brock	Decision (split)	Maximum FC 40	May 9, 2014	3	5:00	Edmonton, Alberta, Canada	
Win	14–5	Bryan Goldsby	Decision (unanimous)	Titan FC 27	February 28, 2014	3	5:00	Kansas City, Kansas, United States	Catchweight (137 lb) bout; Croom missed weight.
Win	13–5	Aslan Toktarbaev	TKO (corner stoppage)	Alash Pride: Great Battle 2	December 19, 2013	1	2:55	Almaty, Kazakhstan	Return to Bantamweight.
Win	12–5	Deryck Ripley	Submission (rear-naked choke)	Midwest Fight League: Saloon Showdown 22	November 22, 2013	1	3:23	Columbia, Missouri, United States	Catchweight (150 lb) bout.
Win	11–5	Dustin Phillips	Submission (rear-naked choke)	Titan FC 26	August 30, 2013	1	1:45	Kansas City, Missouri, United States	
Win	10–5	Javier Lujan	TKO (retirement)	World MMA Council: Mexican Standoff	May 25, 2013	1	3:30	Ciudad Juárez, Mexico	
Win	9–5	Adam Rider	Submission (rear-naked choke)	Cage Time Production 1	May 3, 2013	1	1:16	Columbia, Missouri, United States	Return to Featherweight.
Win	8–5	Brian Pearman	Submission (rear-naked choke)	Tommy Tran Promotions 4	April 6, 2013	1	3:03	Springfield, Missouri, United States	
Win	7–5	Brian Davidson	TKO (punches)	RFA 6	January 18, 2013	1	0:42	Kansas City, Missouri, United States	Catchweight (140 lb) bout.
Win	6–5	Nathan Murdock	Decision (unanimous)	Tommy Tran Promotions 3	November 17, 2012	3	5:00	Branson, Missouri, United States	Return to Lightweight.
Loss	5–5	Yaotzin Meza	Decision (unanimous)	Rage in the Cage 163	October 20, 2012	3	5:00	Chandler, Arizona, United States	
Loss	5–4	Ramiro Hernandez	Decision (split)	Titan FC 21	March 2, 2012	3	5:00	Kansas City, Kansas, United States	Return to Featherweight.
Win	5–3	Rodrigo Sotelo Jr.	Decision (unanimous)	Martinez Brothers Production: Sun City Battle 2	October 1, 2011	3	3:00	El Paso, Texas, United States	
Loss	4–3	Justin Gaethje	KO (slam)	Ring of Fire 41	August 20, 2011	1	1:01	Broomfield, Colorado, United States	Lightweight debut; Gaethje missed weight (158.2 lb).
Win	4–2	J.R. Sotelo	Submission (triangle choke)	Martinez Brothers Production: Sun City Battle 1	July 9, 2011	1	0:16	El Paso, Texas, United States	
Win	3–2	Brian Davidson	Submission (rear-naked choke)	Bellator 26	August 26, 2010	2	3:22	Kansas City, Missouri, United States	
Win	2–2	Kody Frank	Submission (triangle choke)	First Blood: Friday Night Fight Night	November 6, 2009	2	4:05	Sedalia, Missouri, United States	
Win	1–2	Eddie Granado	Submission (rear-naked choke)	Midwest Fight League	June 26, 2009	1	4:52	Boonville, Missouri, United States	
Loss	0–2	Willie Mack	KO (punch)	Warfare Xtreme Cagefighting: Caged Controversy	May 2, 2009	1	0:37	Sedalia, Missouri, United States	Featherweight debut.
Loss	0–1	Jose Vega	Submission	Hulett Productions: First Blood	February 7, 2009	2	2:22	Sedalia, Missouri, United States	Bantamweight debut.

== Bare knuckle boxing record ==
Professional record breakdown
3 matches	2 wins	1 loss
By knockout	2	0
By decision	0	1

Res.	Record	Opponent	Method	Event	Date	Round	Time	Location	Notes
Loss	2–1	Tony Soto	Decision (unanimous)	BKFC 52	October 20, 2023	5	2:00	Columbia, South Carolina, United States	
Win	2–0	Chevvy Bridges	KO (punches)	BKFC KnuckleMania 3	February 17, 2023	1	1:11	Albuquerque, New Mexico, United States	
Win	1–0	Sean Wilson	KO (punch)	BKFC 33	November 18, 2022	2	1:36	Omaha, Nebraska, United States	

== See also ==
- List of male mixed martial artists
