= Andre Soukhamthath =

American mixed martial arts fighter

Andre Soukhamthath ອານເດຣ ສຸຄຳທັດ
- Born: Andre Soukhamthath; October 23, 1988 (age 37); Woonsocket, Rhode Island, U.S.
- Other names: The Asian Sensation
- Height: 5 ft 9 in (1.75 m)
- Weight: 135 lb (61 kg; 9 st 9 lb)
- Division: Bantamweight
- Reach: 72 in (183 cm)
- Stance: Orthodox
- Fighting out of: West Palm Beach, FL, United States
- Team: Blackzilians (2013–2016); Combat Club (2017–2019); Hard Knocks 365 (2017–2019); American Top Team (2019–2022)
- Years active: 2011–2022

Mixed martial arts record
- Total: 24
- Wins: 14
- By knockout: 8
- By submission: 3
- By decision: 3
- Losses: 10
- By decision: 10

Other information
- Mixed martial arts record from Sherdog

Andre Soukhamthath (Lao: ອານເດຣ ສຸຄຳທັດ, born October 23, 1988) is a retired American mixed martial artist who competed in the Bantamweight division. A professional mixed martial artist from 2011 until 2022, he had competed in the Ultimate Fighting Championship and CES MMA.

== Background ==
Born and raised in Woonsocket, Rhode Island, into an immigrant family of Laotian descent, Soukhamthath began competing in soccer as a youngster where he was a standout goalie. He began training in mixed martial arts in 2009. He is the first Laotian American fighter signed to the UFC.

== Mixed martial arts career ==
=== Early career ===
Soukhamthath compiled an amateur record of 1–2 before making his professional debut in 2011. He competed on the regional scene, almost exclusively for CES MMA in his native state of Rhode Island.

He was the reigning CES MMA Bantamweight Champion when he was signed to the UFC in early 2017.

=== Ultimate Fighting Championship ===
Soukhamthath made his promotional debut on March 4, 2017, against Albert Morales at UFC 209. He lost the back-and-forth fight by split decision.

Soukhamthath faced Alejandro Pérez on August 5, 2017, at UFC Fight Night 114. He lost the fight by split decision.

Soukhamthath replaced Bryan Caraway to take on Luke Sanders on December 9, 2017, at UFC Fight Night: Swanson vs. Ortega. He won the fight via TKO in the second round to gain his first UFC win.

On December 22, 2017, Soukhamthath announced to have signed a new, five-fight contract with UFC.

Soukhamthath faced Sean O'Malley at UFC 222. He lost the fight by unanimous decision. This fight earned him the Fight of the Night bonus.

Soukhamthath faced Gavin Tucker on October 27, 2018, at UFC Fight Night 138. However, Tucker pulled out of the fight in early October citing an undisclosed injury and was replaced by promotional newcomer Jonathan Martinez. He won the fight via unanimous decision.

Soukhamthath faced Montel Jackson on April 13, 2019, at UFC 236 He lost the fight by unanimous decision.

Soukhamthath faced Su Mudaerji on August 31, 2019, on UFC on ESPN+ 15. He lost the fight via unanimous decision, and was subsequently released from the promotion.

=== Post-UFC career ===
==== Return to CES MMA ====
Soukhamthath was scheduled to face Da’Mon Blackshear in a bantamweight out at CES MMA 61 on April 24, 2020. However, the event was postponed due to the COVID-19 pandemic.

==== XFC ====
In late 2020, signed a three-fight contract with Xtreme Fighting Championships. He made his promotional debut against Guilherme Faria at XFC 43 on November 11, 2020. He won the bout via split decision.

Soukhamthath faced José Alberto Quiñónez at XFC 44 on May 28, 2021. He lost the bout via unanimous decision.

==== CES MMA ====
Soukhamthath headlined CES MMA 66 against Diego Silva on March 4, 2022. He lost the bout via unanimous decision. After the bout, Soukhamthath placed his gloves in the middle of the cage and announced his retirement from MMA.

==== Global Fight League ====
On December 11, 2024, it was announced that Soukhamthath was signed by Global Fight League. However, in April 2025, it was reported that all GFL events were cancelled indefinitely.

== Personal life ==
Andre and his wife Jamie have had three children; their firstborn – LeAndre – had epidermolysis bullosa and died at the age of nine months.

== Championships and accomplishments ==
- Ultimate Fighting Championship
  - Fight of the Night (One time) vs. Sean O’Malley
- CES MMA
  - CES MMA Bantamweight Championship (One time; former)
    - One successful title defense

=== State/Local ===
- Key to the City of Woonsocket: May 12, 2017

== Mixed martial arts record ==
Professional record breakdown
24 matches	14 wins	10 losses
By knockout	8	0
By submission	3	0
By decision	3	10

Res.	Record	Opponent	Method	Event	Date	Round	Time	Location	Notes
Loss	14–10	Diego Silva	Decision (unanimous)	CES MMA 66	March 4, 2022	5	5:00	Lincoln, Rhode Island, United States	For the vacant CES MMA Bantamweight Championship.
Loss	14–9	José Alberto Quiñónez	Decision (unanimous)	XFC 44	May 28, 2021	3	5:00	Des Moines, Iowa, United States	
Win	14–8	Guilherme Faria	Decision (split)	XFC 43	November 11, 2020	3	5:00	Atlanta, Georgia, United States	Fight of the Night.
Loss	13–8	Su Mudaerji	Decision (unanimous)	UFC Fight Night: Andrade vs. Zhang	August 31, 2019	3	5:00	Shenzhen, China	
Loss	13–7	Montel Jackson	Decision (unanimous)	UFC 236	April 13, 2019	3	5:00	Atlanta, Georgia, United States	
Win	13–6	Jonathan Martinez	Decision (unanimous)	UFC Fight Night: Volkan vs. Smith	October 27, 2018	3	5:00	Moncton, New Brunswick, Canada	
Loss	12–6	Sean O'Malley	Decision (unanimous)	UFC 222	March 3, 2018	3	5:00	Las Vegas, Nevada, United States	Fight of the Night.
Win	12–5	Luke Sanders	TKO (punches)	UFC Fight Night: Swanson vs. Ortega	December 9, 2017	2	1:06	Fresno, California, United States	
Loss	11–5	Alejandro Pérez	Decision (split)	UFC Fight Night: Pettis vs. Moreno	August 5, 2017	3	5:00	Mexico City, Mexico	
Loss	11–4	Albert Morales	Decision (split)	UFC 209	March 4, 2017	3	5:00	Las Vegas, Nevada, United States	
Win	11–3	Kin Moy	TKO (knee and punches)	CES MMA 37	August 12, 2016	2	2:32	Lincoln, Rhode Island, United States	Defended the CES Bantamweight Championship.
Win	10–3	Kody Nordby	KO (flying knee)	CES MMA 33	March 11, 2016	5	1:35	Lincoln, Rhode Island, United States	Won the inaugural CES Bantamweight Championship.
Win	9–3	Carlos Galindo	TKO (elbows)	CES MMA 31	October 30, 2015	2	3:46	Lincoln, Rhode Island, United States	
Loss	8–3	Brian Kelleher	Decision (unanimous)	CES MMA 28	March 13, 2015	3	5:00	Lincoln, Rhode Island, United States	
Win	8–2	Tom English	Submission (rear-naked choke)	CES MMA 26	October 10, 2014	2	2:17	Lincoln, Rhode Island, United States	Catchweight (138 lbs) bout.
Loss	7–2	Kin Moy	Decision (unanimous)	CES MMA 21	January 24, 2014	3	5:00	Lincoln, Rhode Island, United States	Return to Bantamweight.
Win	7–1	Corey Simmons	TKO (retirement)	CES MMA 20	December 6, 2013	1	5:00	Lincoln, Rhode Island, United States	Catchweight (140 lbs) bout.
Win	6–1	Billy Vaughn	Submission (keylock)	CES MMA 19	October 4, 2013	1	3:39	Lincoln, Rhode Island, United States	Featherweight debut.
Win	5–1	Blair Tugman	Decision (unanimous)	CES MMA 17	June 7, 2013	3	5:00	Lincoln, Rhode Island, United States	
Win	4–1	Kurt Chase-Patrick	TKO (punches)	CES MMA 15	February 1, 2013	2	0:45	Lincoln, Rhode Island, United States	
Win	3–1	Rob Costa	TKO (doctor stoppage)	CES MMA 13	October 6, 2012	2	4:44	Providence, Rhode Island, United States	
Win	2–1	Vinny Tisconie	KO (punches)	CES MMA 11	June 15, 2012	1	2:06	Lincoln, Rhode Island, United States	
Win	1–1	Gilvan Santos	Submission (guillotine choke)	CES MMA 9	February 3, 2012	2	0:44	Lincoln, Rhode Island, United States	
Loss	0–1	Robbie Slade	Decision (majority)	Cage Titans 6	September 10, 2011	3	5:00	Plymouth, Massachusetts, United States	Bantamweight debut.

== See also ==
- List of current UFC fighters
- List of male mixed martial artists
