= Strikeforce: Fedor vs. Silva =

Mixed martial arts event in 2011

Strikeforce: Fedor vs. Bigfoot
- The poster for Strikeforce: Fedor vs. Bigfoot
- Promotion: Strikeforce
- Date: February 12, 2011
- Venue: Izod Center
- City: East Rutherford, New Jersey, United States
- Attendance: 11,287

Event chronology
Strikeforce: Diaz vs. Cyborg	Strikeforce: Fedor vs. Bigfoot	Strikeforce: Feijao vs. Henderson

Strikeforce/M-1 Global: Fedor vs. Bigfoot was a mixed martial arts event promoted by Strikeforce in association with M-1 Global. It took place on February 12, 2011 at the Izod Center in East Rutherford, New Jersey. The main card of this event was broadcast live on Showtime, while the preliminary card was broadcast live on HDNet.

== Background ==
This event marked the beginning of the eight-man Strikeforce World Grand Prix Heavyweight Tournament.

The three non-tournament heavyweight bouts on the main card served as tournament reserve bouts, to find alternates in case of any injuries or withdrawals from the tournament. The Del Rosario-Johnson winner was considered the first alternate, followed by the winners of the Overeem-Sefo and Griggs-Villante bouts. The winning alternate fighters were scheduled into two more alternate bouts at Strikeforce: Overeem vs. Werdum that June, with Del Rosario slotted to face undefeated prospect Daniel Cormier for the first alternate slot, and Overeem vs. Griggs for the second, though Del Rosario was replaced by Jeff Monson after a May car accident.

Andrei Arlovski was expected to face Josh Barnett, but Arlovski ended up fighting Sergei Kharitonov.

The event drew a record number of viewers for Strikeforce on Showtime with an average of 741,000 viewers.

== Results ==
Showtime Sports
Weight class				Method	Round	Time	Notes
Heavyweight	Antônio Silva	def.	Fedor Emelianenko	TKO (doctor stoppage)	2	5:00	(Note: Strikeforce Heavyweight Grand Prix Quarterfinal)
Heavyweight	Sergei Kharitonov	def.	Andrei Arlovski	KO (punches)	1	2:49	(Note: Strikeforce Heavyweight Grand Prix Quarterfinal)
Heavyweight	Shane Del Rosario	def.	Lavar Johnson	Submission (armbar)	1	4:31
Heavyweight	Chad Griggs	def.	Gian Villante	TKO (punches)	1	2:49
Heavyweight	Valentijn Overeem	def.	Ray Sefo	Submission (neck crank)	1	1:37
HDNet
Weight class				Method	Round	Time	Notes
Catchweight (156 lb)	John Cholish	def.	Marc Stevens	Submission (kneebar)	2	3:57
Welterweight	Igor Gracie	def.	John Salgado	Technical submission (arm-triangle choke)	2	3:04
Welterweight	Sam Oropeza	def.	Don Carlo-Clauss	TKO (Submission to strikes)	1	4:10
Featherweight	Josh LaBerge	def.	Anthony Leone	TKO (doctor stoppage)	1	5:00
Featherweight	Jason McLean	def.	Kevin Roddy	Decision (split) (29–28, 28–29, 29–28)	3	5:00

== Heavyweight Grand Prix Bracket ==
Quarter-finals
(Russia) Fedor Emelianenko	RD 2
(Brazil) Antônio Silva	TKO
(Netherlands) Alistair Overeem	RD 3
(Brazil) Fabrício Werdum	UD
(Belarus) Andrei Arlovski	RD 1
(Russia) Sergei Kharitonov	KO
(United States) Josh Barnett	RD 2
(United States) Brett Rogers	SUB

Semi-finals
Antônio Silva	RD 1
Daniel Cormier**	KO
Sergei Kharitonov	RD 1
Josh Barnett	SUB

Final
Daniel Cormier	UD
Josh Barnett	RD 5

** = Replacement
