= John Cholish =

American mixed martial arts fighter

- Born: December 17, 1983 (age 42); Hoboken, New Jersey, United States
- Nationality: American
- Height: 5 ft 11 in (1.80 m)
- Weight: 156.2 lb (71 kg; 11 st 2 lb)
- Division: Lightweight
- Reach: 74 in (188 cm)
- Fighting out of: New York, New York, United States
- Team: Renzo Gracie Academy; Gracie Barra Texas
- Teachers: Vinicius Magalhaes; Renzo Gracie
- Rank: Black belt in Brazilian Jiu-Jitsu
- Years active: 2006-2013

Mixed martial arts record
- Total: 11
- Wins: 8
- By knockout: 3
- By submission: 4
- By decision: 1
- Losses: 3
- By submission: 2
- By decision: 1
- Draws: 0

Other information
- Mixed martial arts record from Sherdog

John Cholish (born December 17, 1983) is a retired American mixed martial artist. A professional competitor from 2006 until 2013, he competed for the UFC and Strikeforce.

== Mixed martial arts career ==
=== Early career ===
Cholish made his professional MMA debut in September 2007. He lost his first fight via submission, but won his next seven fights before signing with the UFC.

=== Strikeforce ===
Cholish made his Strikeforce debut in February 2011 as part of the preliminary card for Strikeforce: Fedor vs. Silva. He defeated The Ultimate Fighter veteran Marc Stevens via submission (kneebar) in the second round. Cholish drew considerable attention from MMA news sites for the submission due to its rarity.

=== Ultimate Fighting Championship ===
Cholish made his promotional debut against Mitch Clarke on December 10, 2011, at UFC 140. He won the fight via TKO in the second round.

Cholish faced Danny Castillo on May 5, 2012, at UFC on Fox 3. He was defeated by Castillo via unanimous decision.

Cholish was expected to face Yves Edwards on December 8, 2012, at UFC on Fox 5. However, Cholish was forced out of the bout with a groin injury and replaced by Jeremy Stephens.

Cholish next faced Gleison Tibau on May 18, 2013, at UFC on FX 8. He lost the fight via submission in the second round. After the fight Cholish retired from MMA, citing low pay as the reason for his retirement.

"I'm fortunate enough that I have a job that provides for me really well, I give a lot of these guys credit that fight at this level. I think they could be compensated much better based on the income that the UFC takes in. Fortunately, I can just walk away and I'm OK with it. By no means do I mean it disrespectfully toward any other fighters because I think they do a great job. But hopefully Zuffa and the UFC will start paying them a little better."

— John Cholish, Interview after retirement

== Personal life ==
Cholish, a Cornell University graduate, holds a full-time job with the Marex Spectron which brokers commodities of natural gas crude oil on the institutional platform.

== Mixed martial arts record ==
Professional record breakdown
| 11 matches | 8 wins | 3 losses |
| By knockout | 3 | 0 |
| By submission | 4 | 2 |
| By decision | 1 | 1 |
| Draws | 0 | |

| Res. | Record | Opponent | Method | Event | Date | Round | Time | Location | Notes |
|---|---|---|---|---|---|---|---|---|---|
| Loss | 8–3 | Gleison Tibau | Submission (guillotine choke) | UFC on FX: Belfort vs. Rockhold | May 18, 2013 | 2 | 2:34 | Jaraguá do Sul, Brazil | |
| Loss | 8–2 | Danny Castillo | Decision (unanimous) | UFC on Fox: Diaz vs. Miller | May 5, 2012 | 3 | 5:00 | East Rutherford, New Jersey, United States | |
| Win | 8–1 | Mitch Clarke | TKO (punches) | UFC 140 | December 10, 2011 | 2 | 4:36 | Toronto, Ontario, Canada | |
| Win | 7–1 | Jameel Massouh | Submission (guillotine choke) | Cage Fury Fighting Championships 9 | June 10, 2011 | 2 | 2:25 | Atlantic City, New Jersey, United States | Won vacant CFFC Lightweight Championship. |
| Win | 6–1 | Marc Stevens | Submission (kneebar) | Strikeforce: Fedor vs. Silva | March 26, 2011 | 2 | 3:57 | East Rutherford, New Jersey, United States | |
| Win | 5–1 | Rich Moskowitz | Submission (inverted triangle choke) | Ring of Combat 32 | October 23, 2010 | 3 | 3:05 | Atlantic City, New Jersey, United States | Won vacant Ring of Combat Lightweight Championship. |
| Win | 4–1 | Hitalo Machado | TKO (punches) | Urban Conflict Championships 2 | May 14, 2010 | 4 | 2:25 | Jersey City, New Jersey, United States | |
| Win | 3–1 | Matt Troyer | Submission (arm-triangle choke) | Urban Conflict Championships 1 | March 19, 2010 | 2 | 1:16 | Jersey City, New Jersey, United States | |
| Win | 2–1 | Benoit Guionnet | TKO (punches) | Wreck MMA: Fight for the Troops | December 12, 2009 | 2 | 0:39 | Gatineau, Quebec, Canada | Catchweight (160 lbs) bout. |
| Win | 1–1 | Chris Connor | Decision (unanimous) | Battle at the Nation's Capital | December 13, 2008 | 3 | 5:00 | Washington, D.C., United States | |
| Loss | 0–1 | Jason Patino | Submission (guillotine choke) | Cage Fights 6 | September 29, 2007 | 1 | 2:17 | Fort Myers, Florida, United States | |
