= Kevin Roddy =

American mixed martial arts fighter

- Born: Bricktown, New Jersey, United States
- Nationality: American
- Height: 5 ft 11 in (1.80 m)
- Weight: 145.5 lb (66.0 kg; 10.39 st)
- Division: Featherweight; Lightweight
- Reach: 73.0 in (185 cm)
- Fighting out of: Bricktown, New Jersey, United States
- Team: Pellegrino MMA
- Trainer: Kurt Pellegrino
- Rank: Black belt in Brazilian Jiu-Jitsu
- Years active: 2005–present

Mixed martial arts record
- Total: 31
- Wins: 15
- By submission: 12
- By decision: 3
- Losses: 16
- By knockout: 2
- By submission: 6
- By decision: 8

Other information
- Mixed martial arts record from Sherdog

Kevin Roddy is an American professional mixed martial artist currently competing in Bellator's Featherweight division. A professional competitor since 2005, Roddy has also formerly competed for Strikeforce and M-1 Global.

== Background ==
Born and raised in Bricktown, New Jersey, Roddy competed in soccer and hockey while growing up. Roddy began training in Brazilian jiu-jitsu in 2002 and later MMA in 2005.

== Mixed martial arts career ==
=== Early career ===
Roddy made his professional MMA debut in 2005 and compiled a record of 15-14-1 with one no contest before signing with Bellator MMA. Roddy had also made it through the tryouts of Season Five of The Ultimate Fighter, but ultimately was not a part of the final cast.

== Mixed martial arts record ==
Professional record breakdown
33 matches	15 wins	16 losses
By knockout	0	2
By submission	12	6
By decision	3	8
Draws	1	
No contests	1	

Res.	Record	Opponent	Method	Event	Date	Round	Time	Location	Notes
Loss	15–16–1 (1)	Matt Bessette	Submission (heel hook)	Bellator 144	October 23, 2015	1	3:47	Uncasville, Connecticut, United States	
Win	15–15–1 (1)	Trevor Suter	Submission (armbar)	CCFC 48: Good vs. Burrell	May 9, 2015	1	1:28	Atlantic City, New Jersey, United States	Lightweight bout.
Win	14–15–1 (1)	Amran Aliyev	Decision (unanimous)	Bellator 118	May 2, 2014	3	5:00	Atlantic City, New Jersey, United States	
Loss	13–15–1 (1)	Will Martinez	Submission (rear-naked choke)	Bellator 108	November 15, 2013	1	3:50	Atlantic City, New Jersey, United States	
Win	13–14–1 (1)	Bryan Van Artsdalen	Submission (armbar)	Bellator 95	April 4, 2013	2	1:04	Atlantic City, New Jersey, United States	
Win	12–14–1 (1)	Noe Quintanilla	Submission (triangle choke)	JBS Sports/Live Nation: Rock Out Knock Out	June 2, 2012	1	1:53	Asbury Park, New Jersey, United States	Catchweight (150 lb) bout.
Win	11–14–1 (1)	Chris Simmons	Decision (unanimous)	Reality Fighting: Mohegan Sun	February 25, 2012	3	5:00	Uncasville, Connecticut, United States	Featherweight debut.
Loss	10–14–1 (1)	Saul Almeida	Decision (split)	CES MMA: Undisputed	November 18, 2011	3	5:00	Lincoln, Rhode Island, United States	Catchweight (150 lb) bout.
Loss	10–13–1 (1)	Chris Foster	Decision (unanimous)	UCC 4: Supremacy	April 22, 2011	3	5:00	Morristown, New Jersey, United States	
Loss	10–12–1 (1)	Jason McLean	Decision (split)	Strikeforce: Fedor vs. Silva	February 12, 2011	3	5:00	East Rutherford, New Jersey, United States	
Loss	10–11–1 (1)	Rafaello Oliveira	Submission (rear-naked choke)	DFL 1: The Big Bang	November 24, 2010	1	4:46	Atlantic City, New Jersey, United States	
Win	10–10–1 (1)	Jonathan Chasse	Submission (guillotine choke)	GFL: Global Fight League 8	July 16, 2010	1	2:24	Dover, New Hampshire, United States	
Loss	9–10–1 (1)	Dennis Bermudez	Decision (unanimous)	M-1 Selection 2010: The Americas Round 1	April 3, 2010	3	5:00	Atlantic City, New Jersey, United States	
Loss	9–9–1 (1)	Freddy Assunção	Decision (unanimous)	RIE 2: Battle at the Burg 2	January 30, 2010	3	5:00	Penn Laird, Virginia, United States	
Draw	9–8–1 (1)	Marcos Rodrigues de Santos	Draw (majority)	WCA: Caged Combat	June 5, 2009	3	5:00	Atlantic City, New Jersey, United States	
Win	9–8 (1)	Biff Walizer	Submission (triangle choke)	Extreme Challenge: Mayhem at the Marina	March 28, 2009	2	3:19	Atlantic City, New Jersey, United States	
Loss	8–8 (1)	Jacob Kirwan	Submission (guillotine choke)	RIE 1: Battle at the Burg	March 21, 2009	1	1:42	Harrisonburg, Virginia, United States	
Loss	8–7 (1)	Anthony Morrison	Decision (unanimous)	WCA: Pure Combat	February 6, 2009	3	5:00	Atlantic City, New Jersey, United States	
Win	8–6 (1)	Peter Kalijevic	Submission (armbar)	Knockout Promotions: There Will Be Blood	December 13, 2008	2	1:17	Irving, New York, United States	
Loss	7–6 (1)	Calvin Kattar	KO (punches)	CZ 26: The Rock	September 26, 2008	1	0:47	Salem, New Hampshire, United States	
Loss	7–5 (1)	Dwayne Shelton	Decision (split)	BCX 5: Battle Cage Xtreme 5	July 12, 2008	3	5:00	Atlantic City, New Jersey, United States	
Loss	7–4 (1)	Tim Troxell	Decision (split)	BCX 4: Battle Cage Xtreme 4	April 19, 2008	1	0:58	Atlantic City, New Jersey, United States	
Win	7–3 (1)	Cory LaPlant	Submission (armbar)	BCX 2: Battle Cage Xtreme 2	September 15, 2007	1	0:54	Atlantic City, New Jersey, United States	
Loss	6–3 (1)	Deividas Taurosevicius	Submission (armbar)	CCFC 5: Two Worlds, One Cage	June 23, 2007	1	4:49	Atlantic City, New Jersey, United States	
NC	6–2 (1)	Jong Man Kim	No Contest	Worlds Best Fighters: USA vs. Asia	February 3, 2007	1	4:57	Atlantic City, New Jersey, United States	
Loss	6–2	Rich Boine	KO (punch)	ROC 12: Tournament of Champions Quarterfinals	November 17, 2006	3	0:20	Atlantic City, New Jersey	
Win	6–1	Nick Sorg	Submission (armbar)	XG3: Xtreme Gladiators 3	September 23, 2006	1	N/A	Richmond, Virginia, United States	
Win	5–1	Darryl MarcAurele	Submission (triangle choke)	Reality Fighting: New Hampshire	December 10, 2010	2	N/A	Manchester, New Hampshire, United States	
Win	4–1	Al Buck	Decision (unanimous)	RF 12: Return to Boardwalk Hall	April 29, 2006	3	3:00	Atlantic City, New Jersey, United States	
Win	3–1	Michael Murray	Submission (armbar)	SF 3: Beatdown	April 22, 2006	1	1:10	New Jersey, United States	
Loss	2–1	Jim Miller	Submission (rear-naked choke)	RF 11: Battle at Taj Mahal	February 11, 2006	1	1:31	Atlantic City, New Jersey, United States	
Win	2–0	Joseph Spataro	Submission (arm-triangle choke)	ROC: Ring of Combat 9	October 29, 2005	2	2:21	Asbury Park, New Jersey, United States	Catchweight (150 lb) bout.
Win	1–0	Matt Perry	Submission (armbar)	MD 20: Mass Destruction 20	April 23, 2005	1	N/A	Boston, Massachusetts, United States	Lightweight debut.
