= Genair da Silva =

Brazilian mixed martial artist

- Born: Genair Martins da Silva Junior; December 26, 1983 (age 42); Rio de Janeiro, Brazil
- Other names: Junior PQD
- Height: 5 ft 9 in (1.75 m)
- Weight: 145 lb (66 kg; 10.4 st)
- Division: Featherweight (145 lb); Lightweight (155 lb)
- Reach: 71.0 in (180 cm)
- Style: Submission Wrestling
- Fighting out of: Rio de Janeiro, Brazil
- Team: Renovação Fight Team
- Rank: 2nd Degree Black belt in Luta Livre
- Years active: 2008–present

Mixed martial arts record
- Total: 21
- Wins: 15
- By knockout: 8
- By submission: 4
- By decision: 3
- Losses: 6
- By knockout: 1
- By submission: 2
- By decision: 2
- By disqualification: 1

Other information
- Mixed martial arts record from Sherdog

Genair Martins da Silva Junior (born December 26, 1983) is a Brazilian mixed martial artist who competed in Bellator Fighting Championships' featherweight division.

== Biography ==
=== Early life and mixed martial arts career ===
Genair was born in Rio de Janeiro, Brazil. He is the son of a modest family and longtime resident of the Complexo do Alemão (German's Complex).

At 2003 he started practicing Luta Livre, training alongside Pedro Rizzo, Ebenezer Fontes Braga and others. At 2007 he began in Freestyle wrestling and quickly moved to MMA at 2008. In his first nine bouts, he fought mainly for organizations in his home state. At 2010 he won four straight bouts (achieving a record of 10–3) and subsequently signed with Bellator Fighting Championships.

=== Bellator Fighting Championships ===
Genair made his debut at Bellator 46 against Marlon Sandro in the quarterfinal match of the Bellator Fighting Championships: 2011 Summer Series Featherweight Tournament. He lost via split decision (30-27 Sandro, 29-28 Genair and 29-28 Sandro).

At Bellator 52, Genair faced Bryan Goldsby. On the day of the weight-ins for the fight, Genair did not make the 145 lb weight limit. The fighters have agreed to fight at a catchweight of 150 lb and Genair lost 20% of his purse. He won the bout via submission in the first round.

At Bellator 60, Genair was expected to face Alexandre Bezerra in the opening round of the Bellator Fighting Championships: Season Six Featherweight Tournament. However, once again he failed to make weight and instead faced Bobby Reardanz in a catchweight bout of 148 lb. He defeated Reardanz via TKO in the third round.

At Bellator 88, Genair faced Alexandre Bezerra in the opening round of the Bellator Fighting Championships: Season Eight Featherweight Tournament. He lost via submission in the first round.

== Mixed martial arts record ==
Professional record breakdown
20 matches	14 wins	6 losses
By knockout	7	2
By submission	4	1
By decision	3	2
By disqualification	0	1
Draws	0	
No contests	0	

Res.	Record	Opponent	Method	Event	Date	Round	Time	Location	Notes
Loss	15–6	Magomedrasul Khasbulaev	KO (punch)	WFCA 38	May 21, 2017	2	4:00	Grozny, Chechnya, Russia	
Win	15–5	Gilbert Patrocinio	KO (punches)	FTF 12: Rizzo vs. Flores	September 12, 2015	1	N/A	Espírito Santo, Brazil	
Win	14–5	Antônio Magno Lima Pereira	Submission (arm-triangle choke)	The Gladiator King	December 15, 2013	3	1:10	Rio de Janeiro, Brazil	
Loss	13–5	Alexandre Bezerra	Submission (armbar)	Bellator 88	February 7, 2013	1	1:40	Duluth, Georgia, United States	Bellator season eight featherweight tournament quarterfinal.
Win	13–4	Bruno Leandro Soares	Submission (arm-triangle choke)	Sparta: MMA	September 29, 2012	1	3:26	Itajaí, Santa Catarina, Brazil	
Win	12–4	Bobby Reardanz	TKO (leg kicks & punches)	Bellator 60	March 9, 2012	3	0:51	Hammond, Indiana, United States	Catchweight bout (148 lb); Genair missed weight.
Win	11–4	Bryan Goldsby	Submission (D'arce choke)	Bellator 52	October 1, 2011	1	3:51	Lake Charles, Louisiana, United States	Catchweight bout (150 lb); Genair missed weight.
Loss	10–4	Marlon Sandro	Decision (split)	Bellator 46	June 25, 2011	3	5:00	Hollywood, Florida, United States	Bellator 2011 summer series featherweight tournament quarterfinal.
Win	10–3	Adriano Gonçalves	Decision (split)	Capital Fight 3	November 5, 2010	3	5:00	Brasília, Brazil	
Win	9–3	Elias Souza	Submission (guillotine choke)	Juiz de Fora Fight: Evolution	October 2, 2010	1	3:18	Juiz de Fora, Minas Gerais, Brazil	
Win	8–3	Rafael Rodrigues	TKO (punches)	Nitrix: Champion Fight 5	May 15, 2010	1	3:18	Balneário Camboriú, Santa Catarina, Brazil	
Win	7–3	Iliarde Santos	TKO (punches)	Nitrix: Show Fight 4	February 6, 2010	1	2:32	Balneário Camboriú, Santa Catarina, Brazil	
Win	6–3	Rony Jason	TKO (doctor stoppage)	Platinum Fight Brazil 2	December 5, 2009	2	5:00	Rio de Janeiro, Brazil	
Loss	5–3	Eduardo Pachu	TKO (doctor stoppage)	Face to Face 2	October 31, 2009	2	2:51	Rio de Janeiro, Brazil	
Loss	5–2	Paulo Gonçalves Silva	DQ (illegal knees to the head)	Watch Out Combat Show 5	September 27, 2009	1	N/A	Rio de Janeiro, Brazil	
Win	5–1	André Luis de Oliveira	Decision (unanimous)	Watch Out Combat Show 5	September 27, 2009	3	5:00	Rio de Janeiro, Brazil	
Win	4–1	Alan Caster Guedes Araújo	Decision (unanimous)	Rio FC 2	June 20, 2009	3	N/A	Rio de Janeiro, Brazil	
Win	3–1	Flávio Serafim	KO (knee)	Iguaçu Fight	July 26, 2008	1	3:37	Rio de Janeiro, Brazil	
Loss	2–1	Vitor Toffanelli	Decision (split)	Fury FC: Fury Trials	May 31, 2008	2	5:00	Rio de Janeiro, Brazil	
Win	2–0	Bruno Amorim	KO (punches)	Fury FC: Fury Trials	May 31, 2008	2	0:16	Rio de Janeiro, Brazil	
Win	1–0	Ronaldo Silva	TKO (punches)	Federação de Kickboxing: Crazy Fight MMA	April 12, 2008	1	0:27	São João de Meriti, Rio de Janeiro, Brazil	
