= UFC Fight Night: Volkan vs. Smith =

UFC mixed martial arts event in 2018

- The poster for UFC Fight Night: Volkan vs. Smith
- Promotion: Ultimate Fighting Championship
- Date: October 27, 2018
- Venue: Avenir Centre
- City: Moncton, New Brunswick, Canada
- Attendance: 6,282
- Total gate: $528,211

Event chronology
UFC 229: Khabib vs. McGregor	UFC Fight Night: Volkan vs. Smith	UFC 230: Cormier vs. Lewis

UFC Fight Night: Volkan vs. Smith (also known as UFC Fight Night 138) was a mixed martial arts event produced by the Ultimate Fighting Championship that was held on October 27, 2018 at Avenir Centre in Moncton, New Brunswick, Canada.

== Background ==
While the UFC has hosted many events across Canada, the event marked the promotion's first visit to New Brunswick.

A light heavyweight bout between former UFC Light Heavyweight Championship challenger Volkan Oezdemir and Anthony Smith served as the event headliner.

Zubaira Tukhugov was scheduled to face Artem Lobov at the event. However, it was reported that Tukhugov was removed from the fight due his role in the UFC 229 post-fight melee. He was replaced by Michael Johnson.

Gavin Tucker was scheduled to face Andre Soukhamthath at the event. However, Tucker pulled out of the fight in early October citing an undisclosed injury and was replaced by promotional newcomer Jonathan Martinez.

At the weigh-ins, Johnson weighed in at 147 lb, 1 pound over the featherweight limit of 146 lb. He was fined 20% of his fight purse and his bout against Lobov proceeded at catchweight.

== Results ==
Main Card (Fox Sports 1)
Weight class				Method	Round	Time	Notes
Light Heavyweight	Anthony Smith	def.	Volkan Oezdemir	Submission (rear-naked choke)	3	4:26
Catchweight (147 lb)	Michael Johnson	def.	Artem Lobov	Decision (unanimous) (29–28, 29–28, 30–27)	3	5:00
Light Heavyweight	Misha Cirkunov	def.	Patrick Cummins	Submission (arm-triangle choke)	1	2:40
Bantamweight	Andre Soukhamthath	def.	Jonathan Martinez	Decision (unanimous) (30–26, 29–28, 29–28)	3	5:00
Light Heavyweight	Gian Villante	def.	Ed Herman	Decision (split) (29–28, 28–29, 29–28)	3	5:00
Welterweight	Court McGee	def.	Alex Garcia	Decision (unanimous) (29–28, 29–28, 30–28)	3	5:00
Preliminary Card (Fox Sports 2)
Welterweight	Sean Strickland	def.	Nordine Taleb	TKO (punches)	2	3:10
Lightweight	Nasrat Haqparast	def.	Thibault Gouti	Decision (unanimous) (29–27, 29–28, 30–26)	3	5:00
Featherweight	Calvin Kattar	def.	Chris Fishgold	TKO (punches)	1	4:11
Women's Bantamweight	Talita Bernardo	def.	Sarah Moras	Decision (unanimous) (30–27, 29–28, 29–28)	3	5:00
Early Preliminary Card (UFC Fight Pass)
Lightweight	Don Madge	def.	Te Edwards	KO (head kick)	2	0:14
Heavyweight	Arjan Bhullar	def.	Marcelo Golm	Decision (unanimous) (29–28, 29–28, 29–27)	3	5:00
Lightweight	Stevie Ray	def.	Jessin Ayari	Decision (unanimous) (29–28, 29–28, 30–27)	3	5:00

== Bonus awards ==
The following fighters received $50,000 bonuses:

- Fight of the Night: Nasrat Haqparast vs. Thibault Gouti
- Performance of the Night: Anthony Smith and Don Madge

== See also ==
- List of UFC events
- 2018 in UFC
- List of current UFC fighters
