= Bryan Goldsby =

American mixed martial arts fighter

- Born: March 24, 1982 (age 44); Macon, Georgia, United States
- Height: 5 ft 9 in (1.75 m)
- Weight: 135 lb (61 kg; 9.6 st)
- Division: Bantamweight (135 lb); Featherweight (145 lb)
- Reach: 73.0 in (185 cm)
- Fighting out of: Cincinnati, Ohio, United States
- Team: Team Jorge Gurgel
- Years active: 2006–present

Mixed martial arts record
- Total: 33
- Wins: 17
- By knockout: 10
- By submission: 1
- By decision: 6
- Losses: 16
- By knockout: 2
- By submission: 7
- By decision: 7

Other information
- Mixed martial arts record from Sherdog

Bryan Goldsby (born March 24, 1982) is an American professional mixed martial arts (MMA) fighter who formerly fought for Bellator Fighting Championships. He currently fights in various promotions across the world and is the current NAAFS Bantamweight Champion.

== MMA career ==
Goldsby made his professional MMA debut in December 2006 and won in just 13 seconds. He holds a notable unanimous decision win over WEC veteran Jeff Curran. He has also fought notable fighters such as UFC and WEC veterans Antonio Banuelos and Will Campuzano.

=== Bellator Fighting Championships ===
Goldsby upset WEC veteran Jeff Curran in his Bellator debut. That win earned him a spot in the Bellator Fighting Championships: Season Three Bantamweight Tournament. He lost to Ed West in the Bantamweight Quarterfinals at Bellator 27 on September 2, 2010. Goldsby replaced injured Ulysses Gomez in the semifinals where he fought Zach Makovsky at Bellator 30. Goldsby lost for the second time in the Bellator Bantamweight Tournament to Makovsky who would go on to win the first ever Bellator Bantamweight Championships. At Bellator 52, Goldsby lost his third consecutive fight in the organization to Genair da Silva, and was released from the promotion shortly afterwards.

=== Titan Fighting Championship ===
In 2014, Goldsby signed with Titan Fighting Championship. He made his debut against Kevin Croom at Titan FC 27 on February 28, 2014. He lost by unanimous decision.

=== Other promotions ===
Goldsby challenged Isaiah Chapman for the NAAFS Bantamweight Championship on March 30, 2013. Goldsby won the championship in the fourth round by TKO (retirement).

Goldsby was expected to face Mark Cherico at Pittsburgh Challenge Series 8 on July 12, 2014, for the PFC Featherweight Championship. However, Goldsby was removed from the bout for unknown reasons and was replaced by Luis Guerra.

== Championships and accomplishments ==
- Atlas Fights
  - Atlas Fights Bantamweight Championship (One time)
- Fight Party MMA
  - FPMMA Featherweight Championship (One time)
- North American Allied Fight Series
  - NAAFS Bantamweight Championship (One time)

== Mixed martial arts record ==
Professional record breakdown
33 matches	17 wins	16 losses
By knockout	10	2
By submission	1	7
By decision	6	7

Res.	Record	Opponent	Method	Event	Date	Round	Time	Location	Notes
Loss	17–16	Kevin Croom	Decision (unanimous)	Titan Fighting Championship 27	February 28, 2014	3	5:00	Kansas City, Kansas, United States	
Win	17–15	Isaiah Chapman	TKO (retirement)	NAAFS: Caged Vengeance	March 30, 2013	4	5:00	Canton, Ohio, United States	Won NAAFS Bantamweight Championship
Win	16–15	Steve Smith	Decision (unanimous)	NAAFS: Caged Fury 18	August 25, 2012	3	5:00	Charleston, West Virginia, United States	
Win	15–15	Matt Munsey	Decision (unanimous)	Fight Party - Tabernacle Fight Party	March 3, 2012	3	5:00	Atlanta, Georgia, United States	Won Fight Party MMA Featherweight Championship. Vacated to fight at Bantamweight.
Win	14–15	Aaron Williams	TKO (punches)	Atlas Fights - Cage Rage 10	February 11, 2012	1	3:53	Biloxi, Mississippi, United States	Won the Atlas Fights Bantamweight Championship.
Loss	13–15	Genair da Silva	Submission (d'arce choke)	Bellator 52	October 1, 2011	1	3:51	Lake Charles, Louisiana, United States	
Loss	13–14	Ronnie Rogers	Submission (guillotine choke)	Wild Bill's Fight Night 39	August 26, 2011	1	1:15	Duluth, Georgia, United States	
Win	13–13	Aaron Williams	Decision (unanimous)	Atlas Fights: Cage Rage 6	February 18, 2011	3	5:00	Biloxi, Mississippi, United States	
Loss	12–13	Zach Makovsky	Decision (unanimous)	Bellator 30	September 23, 2010	3	5:00	Louisville, Kentucky, United States	Bellator Season 3 Bantamweight Tournament Semifinal; Replaced an injured Ulysses Gomez
Loss	12–12	Ed West	Decision (unanimous)	Bellator 27	September 2, 2010	3	5:00	San Antonio, Texas, United States	Bellator Season 3 Bantamweight Tournament Quarterfinal
Win	12–11	Jeff Curran	Decision (unanimous)	Bellator 14	April 15, 2010	3	5:00	Chicago, Illinois, United States	
Loss	11–11	Jon Queiroz	Decision (unanimous)	Clash of the Kings	April 3, 2010	3	5:00	Atlanta, Georgia, United States	
Loss	11–10	Jessie Riggleman	Decision (split)	RIE 2: Battle at the Burg 2	January 30, 2010	3	5:00	Penn Laird, Virginia, United States	
Win	11–9	Jonathan Mackles	TKO (punches)	Moosin: God of Martial Arts	December 11, 2009	2	3:51	Birmingham, Alabama, United States	
Loss	10–9	Zac George	Submission (armbar)	C3: Slammin Jammin Weekend 2	October 30, 2009	2	2:36	Red Rock, Oklahoma, United States	
Win	10–8	Harris Norwood	Decision (unanimous)	Clash of the Kings	October 23, 2009	3	5:00	Kennesaw, Georgia, United States	
Win	9–8	David Love	TKO (punches)	Extreme Combat International 16	August 22, 2009	1	N/A	Huntsville, Alabama, United States	
Win	8–8	Joey Marimberga	KO (punches)	Adrenaline MMA 3: Bragging Rights	June 13, 2009	1	4:57	Birmingham, Alabama, United States	
Loss	7–8	Peter Duncan	Submission (kimura)	CW 11: Decade	March 29, 2009	2	4:05	Belfast, Northern Ireland	
Loss	7–7	Will Campuzano	Submission (triangle choke)	Cage Kings: Total Domination	March 20, 2009	2	1:32	Bossier City, Louisiana, United States	
Win	7–6	Randy Steinke	Submission (rear-naked choke)	EFA: Rebels Without a Cause	March 19, 2009	3	0:24	Monroe, Louisiana, United States	
Loss	6–6	Harris Norwood	Decision (split)	WBFN 18: Ledbetter vs. Naville	January 17, 2009	3	5:00	Duluth, Georgia, United States	
Win	6–5	Thomas Wagner	TKO (punches)	EFA: Caged Fury	October 25, 2008	1	1:19	Monroe, Louisiana, United States	
Loss	5–5	Antonio Banuelos	KO (punch)	PFC 10: Explosive	September 26, 2008	2	0:59	Lemoore, California, United States	
Win	5–4	Matt Troyer	TKO (punches)	RFL: Proving Ground	July 26, 2008	2	3:55	Louisville, Kentucky, United States	
Loss	4–4	Aaron Williams	Submission (triangle choke)	XTC 4: The Irish are Coming	May 31, 2008	3	5:00	Mobile, Alabama, United States	
Win	4–3	Joey Marimberga	Decision (unanimous)	Revolution Fight League: Relentless	May 17, 2008	3	5:00	Macon, Georgia, United States	
Loss	3–3	Stephen Bass	Decision (unanimous)	Throwdown in Mo-Town	April 5, 2008	3	5:00	Moultrie, Georgia, United States	
Win	3–2	Brock Kerry	TKO (punches)	Xtreme Total Combat 3	February 16, 2008	1	N/A	Mobile, Alabama, United States	
Loss	2–2	Marcus Brimage	TKO	Xtreme Freestyle Fighting 7	January 19, 2008	2	1:07	Birmingham, Alabama, United States	
Loss	2–1	Tony Hervey	Submission (choke)	Xtreme Freestyle Fighting 6	December 1, 2007	1	3:08	Dalton, Georgia, United States	
Win	2–0	Chris Crumpton	TKO	GFC 1: First Blood	January 13, 2007	1	N/A	Columbus, Georgia, United States	
Win	1–0	Paul McAdams	KO (punches)	Extreme Combat International 7	December 29, 2006	1	0:13	N/A	
