= CES MMA =

Mixed martial arts promoter based in Rhode Island

Classic Entertainment & Sports
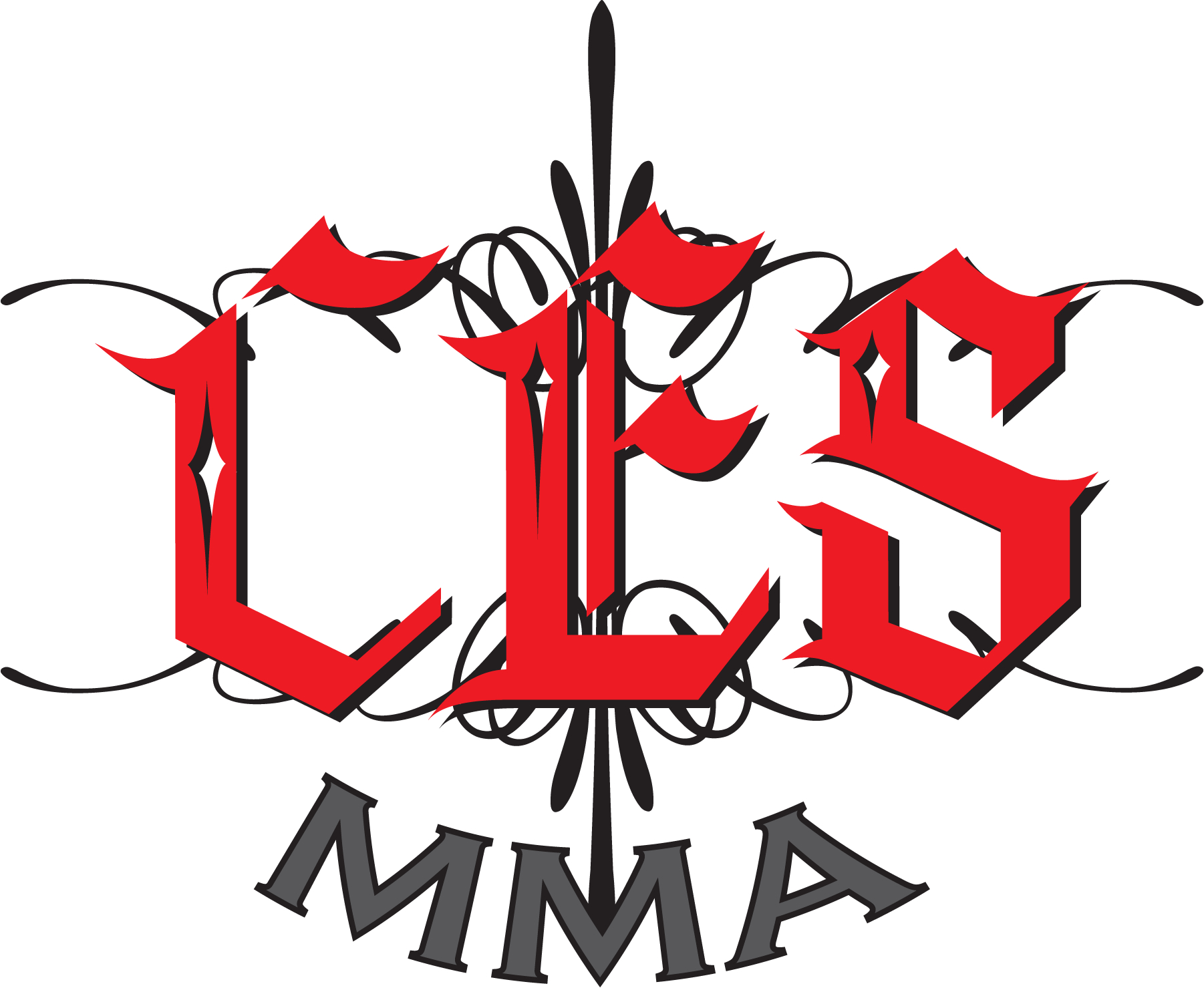
- Industry: Mixed martial arts promotion
- Founded: 2010
- Founder: Jimmy Burchfield, Sr.
- Headquarters: Providence, Rhode Island, United States
- Website: cesfights.com

CES MMA (Classic Entertainment & Sports) is a mixed martial arts promotional firm based out of Providence, Rhode Island founded by boxing promoter Jimmy Burchfield Sr. It promoted the first sanctioned professional mixed martial event in the state of Rhode Island on September 17, 2010, at Twin River Casino.

Since its inception, CES MMA has promoted and developed the careers of several current and former Ultimate Fighting Championships (UFC) contenders, including Calvin Kattar, Rob Font, Andre Soukhamthath, John Howard, Charles Rosa Chuck O'Neil, Tateki Matsuda, Charles Rosa, Alex Karalexis, Thomas Egan, Dominique Steele, and Ricardo Funch.

Other UFC veterans to appear on CES MMA cards include David Loiseau and Drew Fickett. Several CES MMA alums have also made successful transitions to Bellator MMA, most notably Brennan Ward, who won his first three professional fights under the guidance of CES MMA before winning Bellator's middleweight tournament in 2013.

In October 2012, CES MMA promoted its first pay-per-view event at the Dunkin' Donuts Center in Providence, featuring the professional MMA debut of former WWE wrestler Dave Bautista, before signing a multi-year broadcast deal with AXS TV in September 2014 which ended in 2019.

In January 2019 CES MMA started airing live events on UFC Fight Pass with the debut event on UFC Fight Pass being CES 54.

== History ==
=== Inaugural event ===
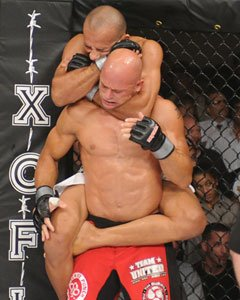
Magno Almeida, top, chokes out Mike Campbell in CES MMA's inaugural event in 2010.

CES MMA held its first event September 17, 2010, at Twin River Casino in Lincoln, Rhode Island, the state's first sanctioned professional mixed martial arts event. The card featured seven bouts, including the main event between Rhode Island native and former World Extreme Cagefighting (WEC) and Reality Fighting vet Mike Campbell and Magno Almeida of Woburn, Massachusetts. Almeida won by rear naked choke submission at the 4:03 mark of the opening round.

Titled "First Blood," CES MMA's inaugural event also featured the debuts of eventual CES MMA fixtures Luis Felix, Pete Jeffrey and Saul Almeida. Also on the undercard, heavyweight Parker Porter defeated Lee Beane by first-round submission (rear naked choke) and Rhode Island vet Mat Santos won his farewell bout following a four-year layoff by defeating Stephen Stengel via kneebar submission in the opening round.

=== Early success ===
Following its inaugural event, CES MMA successfully promoted seven events between 2010 and 2011, including its Foxwoods Resort Casino debut on Oct. 22, 2010. The event featured a main event rematch between Felix and Massachusetts native Joe DeChaves, who also fought on the undercard of "First Blood" the previous month. DeChaves avenged his September loss with a split-decision win, one of nine bouts on the card.

CES MMA returned to Twin River on Dec. 2, 2010 for the first of 10 consecutive events at its home venue. Massachusetts native Dan Lauzon, the brother of UFC vet Joe Lauzon, defeated fellow Massachusetts native Damien Trites in the main event. The undercard also featured the CES MMA debuts of Bellator MMA vet Greg Rebello, Rhode Island's Ruben Rey, Tyson Chartier, Matsuda and Bellator MMA vet Tiawan Howard of Cleveland, Ohio, who would make another appearance with CES MMA a year later.

CES MMA made headlines in 2011 with the signing of former UFC and WEC vet Alex Karalexis, a Boston, Massachusetts native. Karalexis made his CES MMA debut June 10, 2011, at Twin River and lost a controversial split decision to Howard in the main event.

Later that year the promotion crowned its first champion at its November 18 event, titled "Undisputed." Pawtucket, Rhode Island veteran Todd Chattelle won the promotion's inaugural middleweight championship by defeating Massachusetts native Brett Oteri via guillotine choke submission in the opening round of a scheduled five-round bout.

Having established itself as New England's most prolific promotional firm, CES MMA was eventually named the Boston Herald Local MMA Promotion of the Year in 2011. Patrick Sullivan earned Best Matchmaker honors and the June 10 event featuring the Karalexis-Howard main event was named the region's best local card of the year. After finishing 4–0 in 2011 and capturing the CES MMA middleweight title, Chattelle won the Herald's Comeback Fighter of the Year award. CES MMA also announced three additional signings in 2011, including Chattelle, Saul Almeida and Boston's Scott Rehm.

=== Pay-per-view debut ===
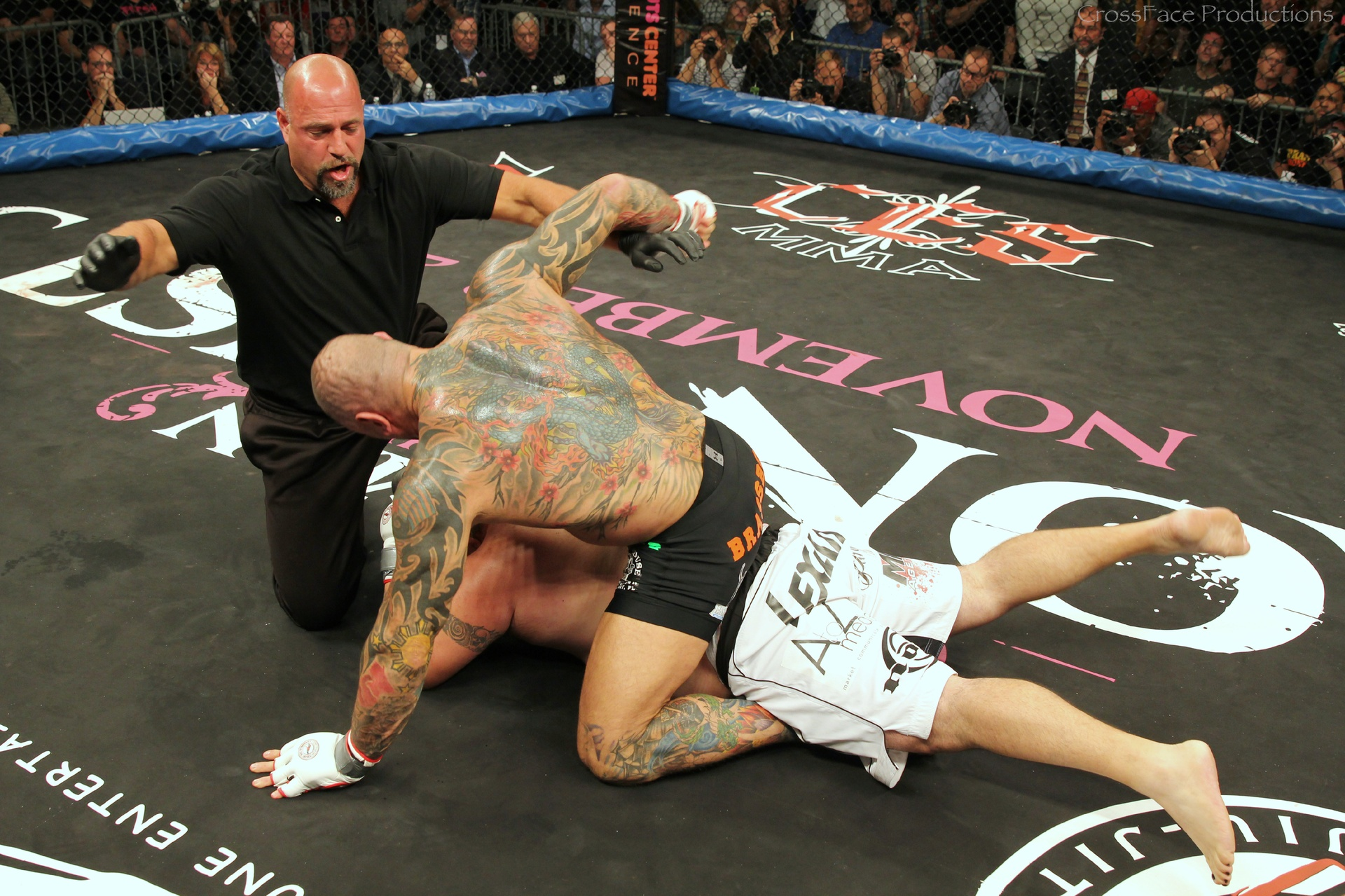
Former WWE champion Dave Bautista, top, strikes Vince Lucero during their pay-per-view super heavyweight bout at The Dunkin' Donuts Center in 2012

On October 6, 2012, CES MMA promoted its first pay-per-view event in association with June Entertainment at the Dunkin' Donuts Center, featuring the MMA debut of Dave Bautista. The event, titled "Real Pain," was made available through DirecTV and featured 13 bouts, including former UFC contenders Loiseau, Howard and Stevens.

Bautista made quick work of his opponent, Vince Lucero, earning a knockout win at the 4:03 mark of the opening round due to excessive unanswered punches. The Boston native Howard, who had previously won the CES MMA middleweight championship by beating Chattelle in April in his CES MMA debut, defeated Brett Chism via second-round knockout on the undercard for his third consecutive win with CES MMA. Chattelle suffered his second consecutive loss just 27 seconds into his bout with Chandler Holderness due to a knockout from a flying knee while Felix defeated Stevens by unanimous decision.

Campbell earned a unanimous decision win over Philadelphia, Pennsylvania vet Gemiyale Adkins and Loiseau stopped Chris McNally via first-round knockout at the 2:30 mark. Ward made his final appearance with CES MMA on the undercard, defeating Shedrick Goodridge by knockout 2:36 into the opening round.

=== Championship expansion ===
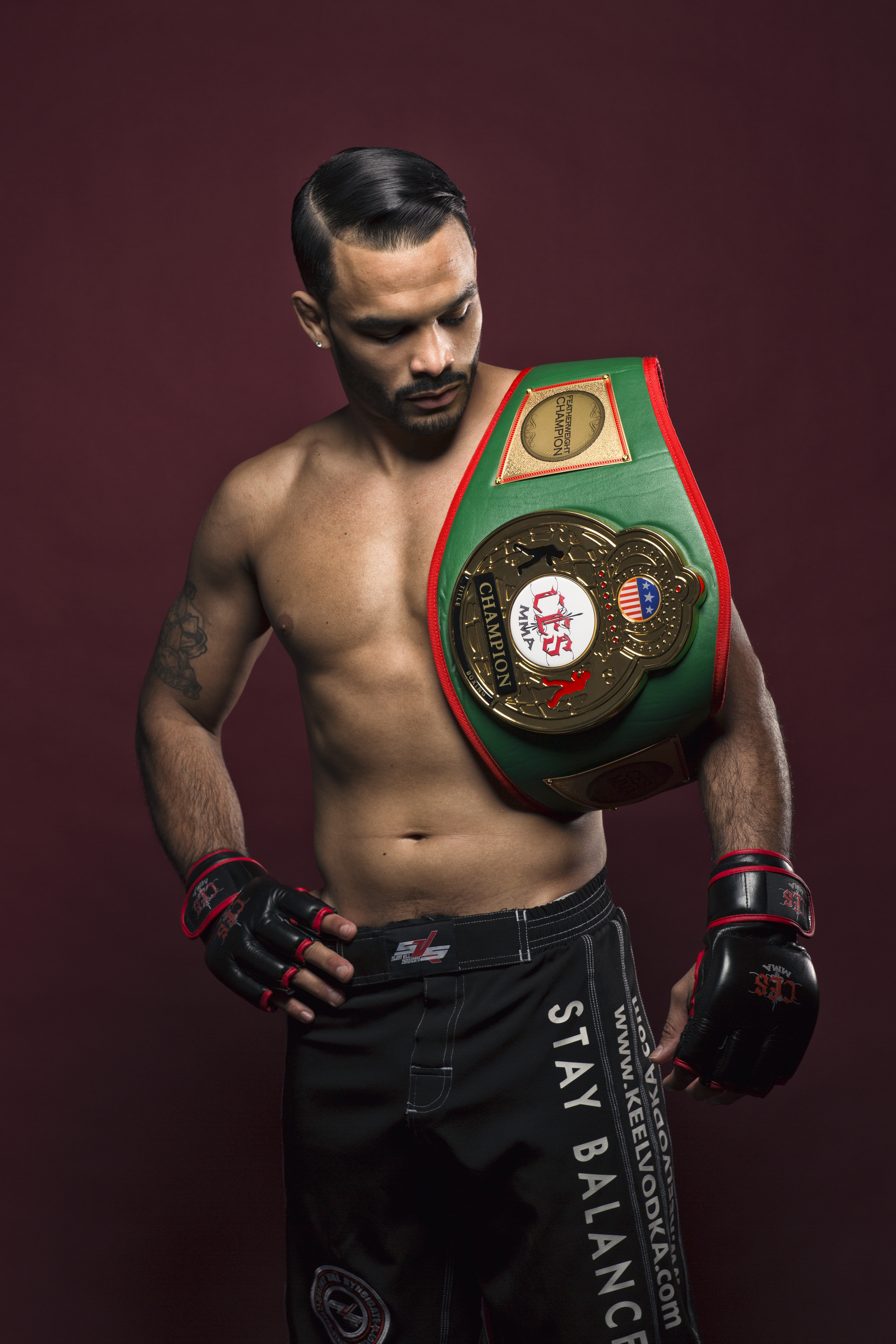
CES MMA featherweight champion Rob Font

CES MMA kicked off 2013 by introducing its second title, the CES MMA lightweight championship. Campbell won the crown on February 1, 2013, at Twin River by defeating former Spanish Olympic boxer and Barcelona, Spain native Abner Lloveras by unanimous decision. It would coincidentally be the final fight of Campbell's career. Titled "Undisputed 2,"' the card was a sequel to CES MMA's "Undisputed" event in 2011 in which Chattelle won the promotion's inaugural middleweight championship.

"Undisputed 2" was also noteworthy as the first CES MMA appearance of Font, the Boston bantamweight who earned an upset win over Saul Almeida on the undercard, beginning a stretch of six consecutive wins with CES MMA before making his UFC debut in July 2014. Font would eventually become the second fighter under CES MMA's guidance to return or advance to the UFC, preceded by Howard, who won five consecutive fights by knockout with CES MMA before returning to the UFC in August 2013.

Font would also go on to capture CES MMA's inaugural featherweight championship with a first-round knockout win over Connecticut native Chris Foster on August 9, 2013, at Twin River in the main event of "Gold Rush."

=== 20th event ===
With four events already in the books for 2013, CES MMA closed out the year at Twin River with its 20th show, titled, "CES MMA XX." It marked the first time CES MMA began numbering its events chronologically.

"CES MMA XX" featured 10 bouts. Font defeated Matt DiMarcantonio by unanimous decision in the main event. Woonsocket, Rhode Island bantamweight Andre Soukhamthath won his seventh consecutive bout under the guidance of CES MMA on the undercard by defeating Corey Simmons via first-round TKO. Soukhamthath also tied Chattelle as the promotion's winningest fighter with seven victories. Rebello, Felix, Rosa and Oteri also won on the undercard.

=== AXS TV debut ===
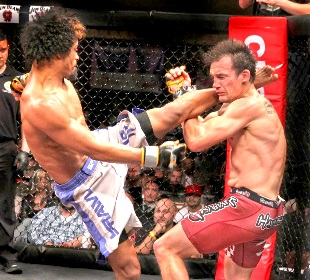
Luis Felix, left, delivers the knockout blow against former UFC vet Drew Fickett in 2013.

CES MMA introduced its fourth championship on March 14, 2014, at Twin River when Boston heavyweight John Johnston defeated former UFC challenger Josh Hendricks by knockout at the 4:36 mark of the opening round due to excessive punches.

The heavyweight title bout was the co-feature of "CES MMA XXII," also noteworthy for Fickett's first and final appearance with CES MMA. The longtime UFC vet challenged Felix, who earned the biggest win of his career by knocking out Fickett with a head kick at 2:29 of the opening round.

On August 8, 2014, at Twin River, CES MMA made its long-awaited AXS TV debut with "CES MMA XXV." Former The Ultimate Fighter reality television alum Julian Lane defeated Felix in the main event to capture the CES MMA lightweight crown vacated by Campbell. Lane earned the victory via guillotine choke submission at the 4:56 mark of the third round. The stage had been set between Lane and Felix when the two were supposed to fight at "CES MMA XXIV," but Felix was forced to withdraw due to an injury.

The televised portion of "CES MMA XXV" featured six bouts, including a second-round knockout win for Brazilian Gil de Freitas over George Sheppard and Matsuda's submission win over Robbie Leroux. Matsuda would make his UFC debut a month later. Rosa also fought his final bout with CES MMA on the main card, defeating Jake Constant via first-round armbar submission. Rosa went on to face Dennis Siver in his UFC debut two months later. Adkins returned to Twin River at "CES MMA XXV" and defeated Rhode Island's Nate Andrews by unanimous decision.

Six weeks later, AXS TV announced it had signed a multi-year broadcast deal with CES MMA. On October 10, 2014, CES MMA crowned a champion in a new weight class when O'Neil won the promotion's inaugural welterweight title with a second-round armbar submission over fellow UFC alum Ricardo Funch in the main event of "CES MMA XXVI" at Twin River. The promotion's reigning heavyweight champion Johnston also won that night via first-round knockout over Keith Bell and subsequently announced his retirement at the age of 43, ending his career with a perfect 7–0 record with all seven wins coming by knockout.

The first event of the new broadcast deal with AXS TV took place January 30, 2015, with "CES MMA XXVII." Lane defended his CES MMA lightweight title with a split-decision win over Boston's Lucas Cruz and O'Neil, a former The Ultimate Fighter alum, knocked out Emmanuel Walo 11 seconds into the opening round of their main-event welterweight bout.

On June 12, 2015, the promotion's welterweight title changed hands at "CES MMA XXIX" when Cincinnati veteran Dominique Steele defeated O'Neil by unanimous decision, 48–47, 48–47, 49–46, in the five-round main event on AXS TV. Rebello earned a knockout win over Tyler King on the main card and former Bellator standout Matthew Bessette knocked out Khama Worthy of Pittsburgh in his CES MMA debut. Steele vacated the belt in July to fight on "UFC on Fox 16" in Chicago as a replacement for the injured Antonio Braga Neto in a preliminary welterweight bout against Zak Cummings.

CES MMA celebrated its 30th show on Aug. 14, 2015 with "CES MMA XXX" at Twin River. The main event featured the long-awaited rematch between Lane and Felix for Lane's CES MMA lightweight title. This time, Felix won by unanimous decision, 49–46, 49–46, 48–47, to capture the title and become the promotion's third lightweight champion. "CES MMA XXX" also featured a showdown between Lenny Wheeler and Bessette, which Wheeler won by knockout 39 seconds into the opening round.

CES MMA 53 was the last CES MMA event on AXS TV as the multi year contract ended in 2019.

== Current champions ==
Division	Champion	Since	Defenses
Heavyweight	(Cape Verde) Yorgan De Castro	May 3, 2024 (CES 77)	0
Light Heavyweight			
Middleweight	(United States) Gary Balletto Jr.	July 29, 2023 (CES 74)	0
Welterweight	(United States) Gary Balletto Jr.	Feb. 23, 2024 (CES 76)	0
Lightweight	(United States) Charles Rosa	May 3, 2024 (CES 77)	1
Featherweight	(Brazil) Regivaldo Carvalho	October 20, 2023 (CES 75)	0
Bantamweight			0
Flyweight	(United States) Mitch Raposo	November 17, 2022 (CES 71)	0

== Championship history ==
=== Heavyweight Championship ===
Weight limit: 265 lb (120.2 kg)

No.	Name	Event	Date	Defenses
1	(United States) John Johnston def. Josh Hendricks	CES 22; Lincoln, RI, USA	Mar 14, 2014	
Johnston vacated.
2	(Brazil) Juliano Coutinho def. Ashley Gooch for interim title	CES 45; Lincoln, RI, USA	Aug 11, 2017	
Coutinho vacated.
3	(United States) Greg Rebello def. Travis Wiuff	CES 48; Lincoln, RI, USA	Feb 2, 2018	1. def. Kevin Haley at CES 57 on Jul 26, 2019; 2. def. Jordan Mitchell at CES 60 on Jan 24, 2020
Rebello vacated.
4	(Portugal) Domingos Barros def. William Knight	CES 73; Beverly, MA USA	May 12, 2023	
Barros vacated.
5	(Cape Verde) Yorgan De Castro def. Kevin Sears	CES 77; Ledyard, CT, USA	May 3, 2024	

=== Super Middleweight Championship ===
Weight limit: 195 lb (88.5 kg)

No.	Name	Event	Date	Defenses
1	(United States) John Howard def. Scott Rehm	CES 12; Lincoln, RI, USA	Aug 3, 2012	
Howard vacated.

=== Middleweight Championship ===
Weight limit: 185 lb (83.9 kg)

No.	Name	Event	Date	Defenses
1	(United States) Todd Chattelle def. Brett Oteri	CES 8 Lincoln, RI, USA	Nov 18, 2011	
2	(United States) John Howard	CES 10; Lincoln, RI, USA	April 13, 2012	1. def. Brett Chism at CES 13 on Oct 16, 2012
Howard vacated.
3	(United States) Billy Ray Goff def. Justin Sumter	CES 67; Hartford, CT, USA	Apr 1, 2022	
Goff vacated to compete for the UFC.
4	(United States) Tim Caron def. Fran Collins	CES 72; Mashantucket, CT, USA	Mar 18, 2023	
Caron vacated.
5	(United States) Gary Balletto Jr. def. James Cannon	CES 74; Cranston, RI, USA	Jul 29, 2023	

=== Welterweight Championship ===
Weight limit: 170 lb (77.1 kg)

No.	Name	Event	Date	Defenses
1	(United States) Chuck O’Neil def. Ricardo Funch	CES 26; Lincoln, RI, USA	Oct 10, 2014	1. def. Manny Walo at CES 27 on Jan 30, 2015
2	(United States) Dominique Steele	CES 29; Lincoln, RI, USA	Jun 12, 2015	
O’Neil vacated to compete for the UFC.
3	(Brazil) Gil De Freitas def. Chip Moraza-Pollard	CES 31; Lincoln, RI, USA	Oct 30, 2015	
4	(United States) Chris Curtis	CES 32; Lincoln, RI, USA	Jan 8, 2016	1. def. Will Santiago at CES 42 on Mar 31, 2017; 2. def. Jason Norwood at CES 49 on Apr 6, 2018
Curtis vacated.
5	(United States) Jeremiah Wells def. Jason Norwood	CES 52; Philadelphia, PA, USA	Aug 17, 2018	
6	(Brazil) Vinicius de Jesus	CES 55; Hartford, CT, USA	Mar 29, 2019	1. def. Chris Lozano at CES 58 on Sep 7, 2019
de Jesus vacated.
7	(United States) Billy Ray Goff def. Gary Balleto Jr.	CES 66; Lincoln, RI, USA	Mar 4, 2022	
Goff vacated.
8	(United States) Gary Baletto Jr. def. Pat Casey	CES 76; Ledyard, CT, USA	Feb. 23, 2024	

=== Lightweight Championship ===
Weight limit: 155 lb (70.3 kg)

No.	Name	Event	Date	Defenses
1	(United States) Mike Campbell def. Abner Lloveras	CES 15; Lincoln, RI, USA	Feb 1, 2013	
Campbell vacated.
2	(United States) Julian Lane def. Luis Felix	CES 25; Lincoln, RI, USA	Aug 8, 2014	1. def. Lucas Cruz at CES 27 on Jan 30, 2015
3	(United States) Luis Felix	CES 30; Lincoln, RI, USA	Aug 14, 2015	
Felix vacated.
4	(United States) Nate Andrews def. Chris Padilla	CES 49; Lincoln, RI, USA	April 6, 2018	1. def. D’Juan Owens at CES 51 on Aug 3, 2018; 2. def. Bryce Logan at CES 54 on Jan 19, 2019
Owens vacated to compete for the PFL.
5	(United States) Matt Bessette def. Ryan Dela Cruz	CES 64; Hartford, CT, USA	Sep 17, 2021	
Bessette vacated.
6	(United States) Nathan Ghareeb def. Antonio Castillo Jr.	CES 71; Lincoln, RI, USA	Nov 17, 2022	
Ghareeb vacated.
7	(United States) Charles Rosa def. Josh Harvey	CES 77; Ledyard, CT, USA	May 3, 2024	1. def. Patrick Benson at CES 78 on Aug 3, 2024

=== Featherweight Championship ===
Weight limit: 145 lb (65.8 kg)

No.	Name	Event	Date	Defenses
1	(United States) Rob Font def. Chris Foster	CES 18; Lincoln, RI, USA	Aug 9, 2013	1. def. Matthew DiMarcantonio at CES 20 on Dec 6, 2013
Font vacated.
2	(United States) Matt Bessette def. Joe Pingitore	CES 37; Lincoln, RI, USA	Aug 12, 2016	1. def. Kevin Croom at CES 41 on Jan 27, 2017; 2. def. Rey Trujillo at CES 44 on May 12, 2017
—	(Puerto Rico) Pedro Gonzalez def. Saul Almeida for interim title	CES 45; Lincoln, RI, USA	Aug 11, 2017	
Gonzalez vacated.
Bassette vacated to compete for the UFC.
3	(United States) Bruce Boyington def. Sean Soriano	CES 51; Lincoln, RI, USA	Aug 3, 2018	1. def. Dan Dubuque at CES 56 on May 31, 2019
Boyington vacated.
4	(United States) Matt Bessette (2) def. Charles Cheeks III	CES 60; Lincoln, RI, USA	Jan 24, 2020	
Bessette vacated.
5	(United States) Dan Dubuque def. Nathan Ghareeb	CES 70; Springfield, MA, USA	Sep 9, 2022	
Bessette vacated.
6	(Brazil) Regivaldo Carvalho def. Don Shainis	CES 75; Ledyard, CT, USA	Oct 20, 2023	1. def. J.T. Schulte at CES 78 on Aug 3, 2024

=== Bantamweight Championship ===
Weight limit: 135 lb (61.2 kg)

No.	Name	Event	Date	Defenses
1	(United States) Andre Soukhamthath def. Kody Nordby	CES 33; Lincoln, RI, USA	Mar 11, 2016	1. def. Kin Moy at CES 37 on Aug 12, 2016
Soukhamthath vacated to compete for the UFC.
2	(United States) Tony Gravely def. Kody Nordby	CES 53; Lincoln, RI, USA	Nov 2, 2018	1. def. Kris Moutinho at CES 54 on Jan 19, 2019; 2. def. Darren Mima at CES 55 on Mar 29, 2019
Gravely vacated to compete for the UFC.
3	(United States) Josh Smith def. Dinis Paiva	CES 62; Orlando, FL, USA	Apr 30, 2021	
4	(United States) Jay Perrin	CES 64; Hartford, CT, USA	Sep 17, 2021	
Perrin vacated to compete for the UFC.
5	(Brazil) Diego Silva def. Andre Soukhamthath	CES 66; Lincoln, RI, USA	Mar 4, 2022	
Silva vacated to compete for the LFA.
6	(United States) Ashiek Ajim def. Azjavkhlan Baatar	CES 69; Lincoln, RI, USA	Jun 17, 2022	
Ajim vacated.

=== Flyweight Championship ===
Weight limit: 125 lb (56.7 kg)

No.	Name	Event	Date	Defenses
1	(United States) Blaine Shutt def. Johnny Lopez	CES 60; Lincoln, RI, USA	Jan 24, 2020	
Shutt vacated to compete for Bellator MMA.
2	(United States) Mitch Raposo def. Flavio Carvalho	CES 71; Lincoln, RI, USA	Nov 17, 2022	

== Events ==
Event Title	Date	Location
CES MMA 80	April 5, 2025	Cranston, Rhode Island, U.S.
CES MMA 79	November 9, 2024	Ledyard, Connecticut, U.S.
CES MMA 78	August 3, 2024	Ledyard, Connecticut, U.S.
CES MMA 77	May 3, 2024	Ledyard, Connecticut, U.S.
CES MMA 76	February 23, 2024	Ledyard, Connecticut, U.S.
CES MMA 75	October 20, 2023	Ledyard, Connecticut, U.S.
CES MMA 74	July 29, 2023	Cranston, Rhode Island, U.S.
CES MMA 73	May 12, 2023	Beverley, Massachusetts, U.S.
CES MMA 72	March 18, 2023	Mashantucket, Connecticut, U.S.
CES MMA 71	November 17, 2022	Lincoln, Rhode Island, U.S.
CES MMA 70	September 9, 2022	Springfield, Massachusetts, U.S.
CES MMA 69	June 17, 2022	Lincoln, Rhode Island, U.S.
CES MMA 68	May 6, 2022	West Fargo, North Dakota, U.S.
CES MMA 67	April 1, 2022	Hartford, Connecticut, U.S.
CES MMA 66	March 4, 2022	Lincoln, Rhode Island, U.S.
CES MMA 65	November 7, 2021	Providence, Rhode Island, U.S.
CES MMA 64	September 17, 2021	Hartford, Connecticut, U.S.
CES MMA 63	August 6, 2021	Springfield, Massachusetts, U.S.
CES MMA 62	April 30, 2021	Orlando, Florida, U.S.
CES MMA 61	October 14, 2020	Warwick, Rhode Island, U.S.
CES MMA 60	January 24, 2020	Lincoln, Rhode Island, U.S.
CES MMA 59	October 25, 2019	Lincoln, Rhode Island, U.S.
CES MMA 58	September 7, 2019	Hartford, Connecticut, U.S.
CES MMA 57	July 26, 2019	Lincoln, Rhode Island, U.S.
CES MMA 56	May 31, 2019	Hartford, Connecticut, U.S.
CES MMA 55	March 29, 2019	Hartford, Connecticut, U.S.
CES MMA 54	January 19, 2019	Lincoln, Rhode Island, U.S.
CES MMA 53	November 2, 2018	Lincoln, Rhode Island, U.S.
CES MMA 52	August 17, 2018	Philadelphia, Pennsylvania, U.S.
CES MMA 51	August 3, 2018	Lincoln, Rhode Island, U.S.
CES MMA 50	June 15, 2018	Lincoln, Rhode Island, U.S.
CES MMA NY	May 4, 2018	Westbury, New York, U.S.
CES MMA 49	April 6, 2018	Lincoln, Rhode Island, U.S.
CES MMA 48	February 2, 2018	Lincoln, Rhode Island, U.S.
CES MMA 47	November 17, 2017	Lincoln, Rhode Island, U.S.
CES MMA 46	October 27, 2017	Lincoln, Rhode Island, U.S.
CES MMA 45	August 11, 2017	Lincoln, Rhode Island, U.S.
CES MMA 44	May 12, 2017	Lincoln, Rhode Island, U.S.
CES MMA 43	April 15, 2017	Beverly, Massachusetts, U.S.
CES MMA 42	March 31, 2017	Lincoln, Rhode Island, U.S.
CES MMA 41	January 27, 2017	Lincoln, Rhode Island, U.S.
CES MMA 40	November 23, 2016	Lincoln, Rhode Island, U.S.
CES MMA 39	November 4, 2016	Plymouth, Massachusetts, U.S.
CES MMA 38	September 23, 2016	Mashantucket, Connecticut, U.S.
CES MMA 37	August 12, 2016	Lincoln, Rhode Island, U.S.
CES MMA 36	June 10, 2016	Lincoln, Rhode Island, U.S.
CES MMA 35	April 16, 2016	Beverly, Massachusetts, U.S.
CES MMA 34	April 1, 2016	Mashantucket, Connecticut, U.S.
CES MMA 33	March 11, 2016	Lincoln, Rhode Island, U.S.
CES MMA 32	January 8, 2016	Lincoln, Rhode Island, U.S.
CES MMA 31	October 30, 2015	Lincoln, Rhode Island, U.S.
CES MMA 30	August 14, 2015	Lincoln, Rhode Island, U.S.
CES MMA 29	June 12, 2015	Lincoln, Rhode Island, U.S.
CES MMA 28	March 13, 2015	Lincoln, Rhode Island, U.S.
CES MMA 27	January 30, 2015	Lincoln, Rhode Island, U.S.
CES MMA 26	October 10, 2014	Lincoln, Rhode Island, U.S.
CES MMA 25	August 8, 2014	Lincoln, Rhode Island, U.S.
CES MMA 24	June 27, 2014	Lincoln, Rhode Island, U.S.
CES MMA 23	April 25, 2014	Lincoln, Rhode Island, U.S.
CES MMA 22	March 14, 2014	Lincoln, Rhode Island, U.S.
CES MMA 21	January 24, 2014	Lincoln, Rhode Island, U.S.
CES MMA 20	December 6, 2013	Lincoln, Rhode Island, U.S.
CES MMA 19.5	November 15, 2013	Uncasville, Connecticut, U.S.
CES MMA 19	October 4, 2013	Lincoln, Rhode Island, U.S.
CES MMA 18	August 9, 2013	Lincoln, Rhode Island, U.S.
CES MMA 17	June 7, 2013	Lincoln, Rhode Island, U.S.
CES MMA 16	April 12, 2013	Lincoln, Rhode Island, U.S.
CES MMA 15	February 1, 2013	Lincoln, Rhode Island, U.S.
CES MMA 14	December 7, 2012	Lincoln, Rhode Island, U.S.
CES MMA 13	October 6, 2012	Providence, Rhode Island, U.S.
CES MMA 12	August 3, 2012	Lincoln, Rhode Island, U.S.
CES MMA 11	June 15, 2012	Lincoln, Rhode Island, U.S.
CES MMA 10	April 13, 2012	Lincoln, Rhode Island, U.S.
CES MMA 9	February 3, 2012	Lincoln, Rhode Island, U.S.
CES MMA 8	November 18, 2011	Lincoln, Rhode Island, U.S.
CES MMA 7	September 9, 2011	Lincoln, Rhode Island, U.S.
CES MMA 6	June 10, 2011	Lincoln, Rhode Island, U.S.
CES MMA 5	April 8, 2011	Lincoln, Rhode Island, U.S.
CES MMA 4	February 25, 2011	Lincoln, Rhode Island, U.S.
CES MMA 3	December 2, 2010	Lincoln, Rhode Island, U.S.
CES MMA 2	October 22, 2010	Mashantucket, Connecticut, U.S.
CES MMA 1	September 17, 2010	Lincoln, Rhode Island, U.S.

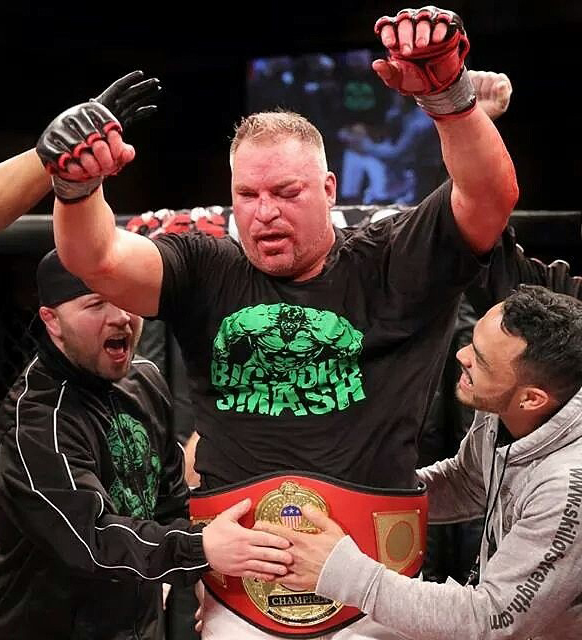
CES MMA heavyweight champion John Johnston

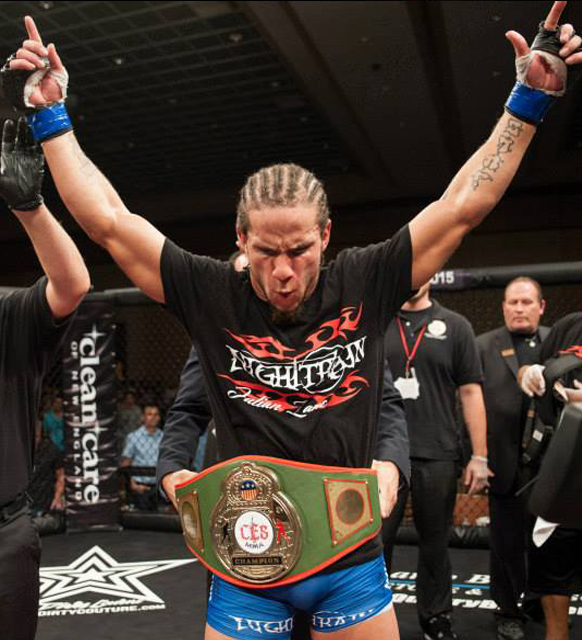
CES MMA lightweight champion Julian Lane

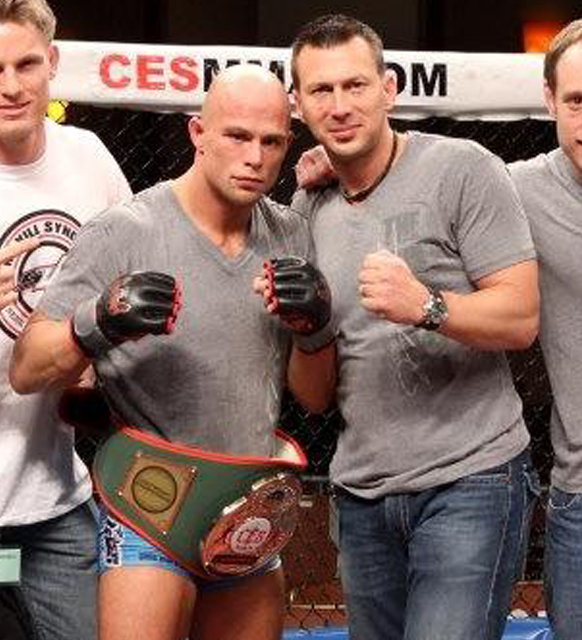
CES MMA lightweight champion Mike Campbell

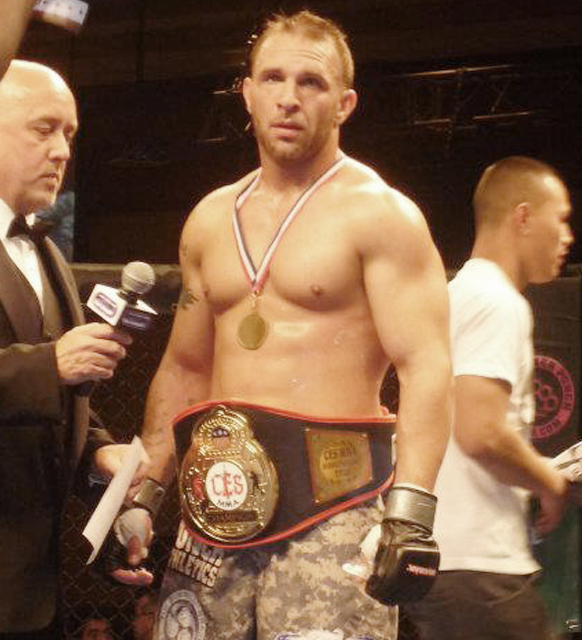
CES MMA middleweight champion Todd Chattelle

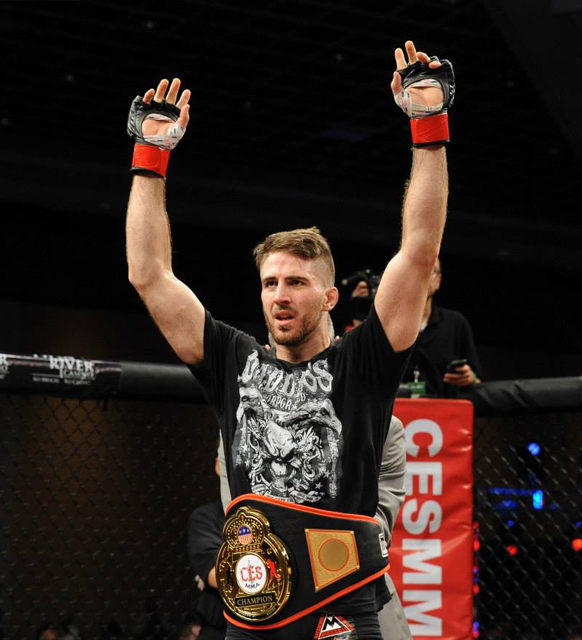
CES MMA welterweight champion Chuck O'Neil

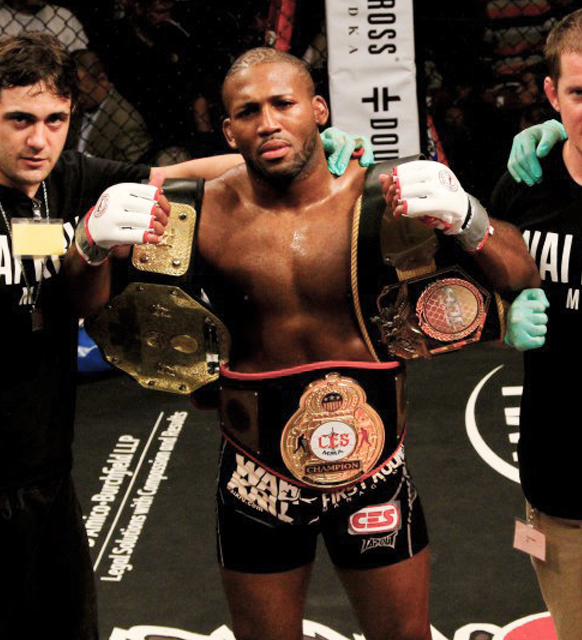
CES MMA middleweight champion John Howard

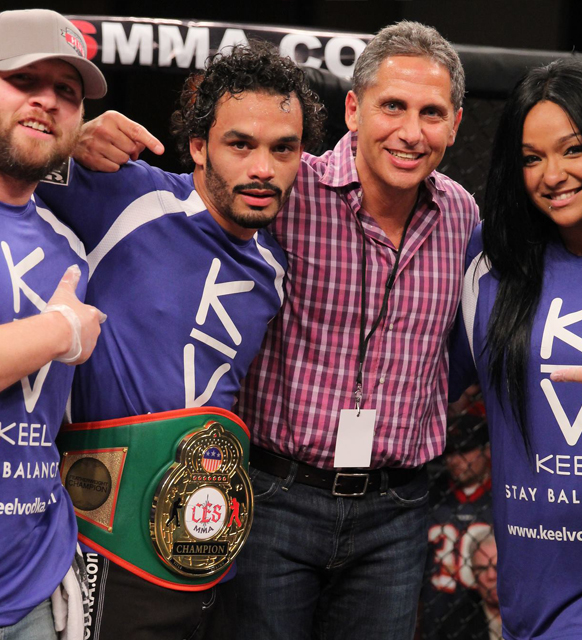
CES MMA featherweight champion Rob Font

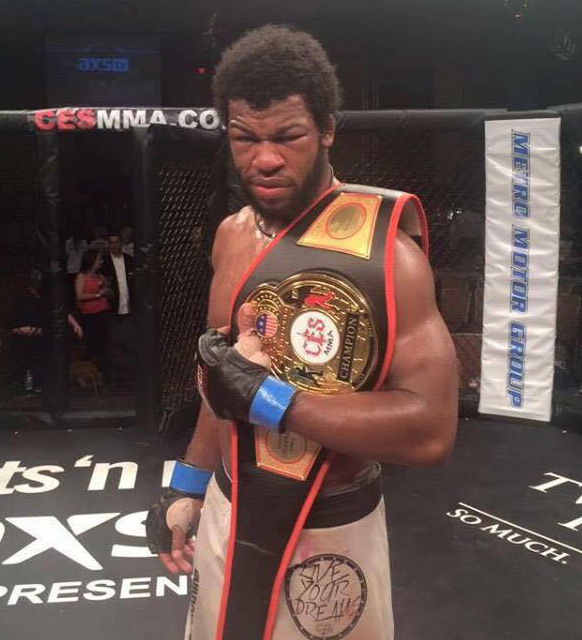
CES MMA welterweight champion Dominique Steele

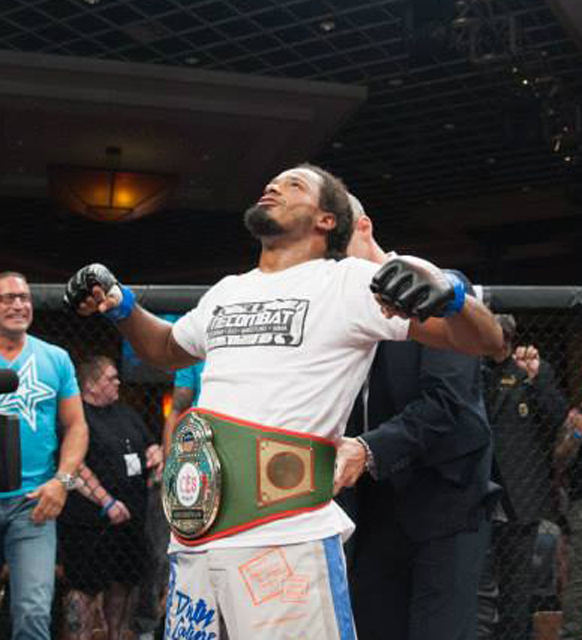
CES MMA lightweight champion Luis Felix

CES MMA champions past and present
