= Gogoplata =

Type of wrestling chokehold

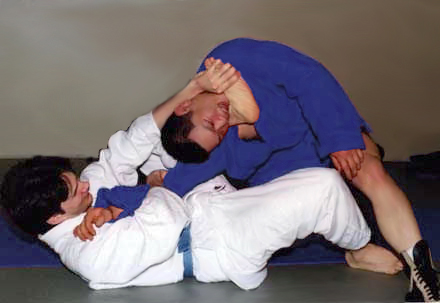
- Gogoplata variation, opponent's throat is trapped between the fighter's shin and forearm.
- AKA: kagato-jime, hasami-jime
- Parent hold: Guard, Rubber guard
- Child hold(s): Locoplata
- Attacks: Trachea

A gogoplata, foot choke "Piroplata" or kagato-jime (踵絞) is a type of chokehold that utilizes the shin bone. This technique is often used in Kodokan Judo, submission grappling, and Brazilian jiu-jitsu.

== History ==
In the film The Essence of Judo, judoka Kyuzo Mifune demonstrated a movement entitled hasami-jime (鋏絞, scissors choke), not to be confused with the gi choke also called hasami-jime, where he applied the choke while transitioning from the bottom of the kami-shiho-gatame position. This variation would be applied using the forearm against the opponent's trachea with the leg used to secure it on position. The first demonstration of a gogoplata as it is used today was in Mikonosuke Kawaishi's book My Method of Judo, where it was named as kakato-jime (踵絞, heel choke).

The name gogoplata comes from the Portuguese word "gogó" for the adam's apple area.

== Execution ==
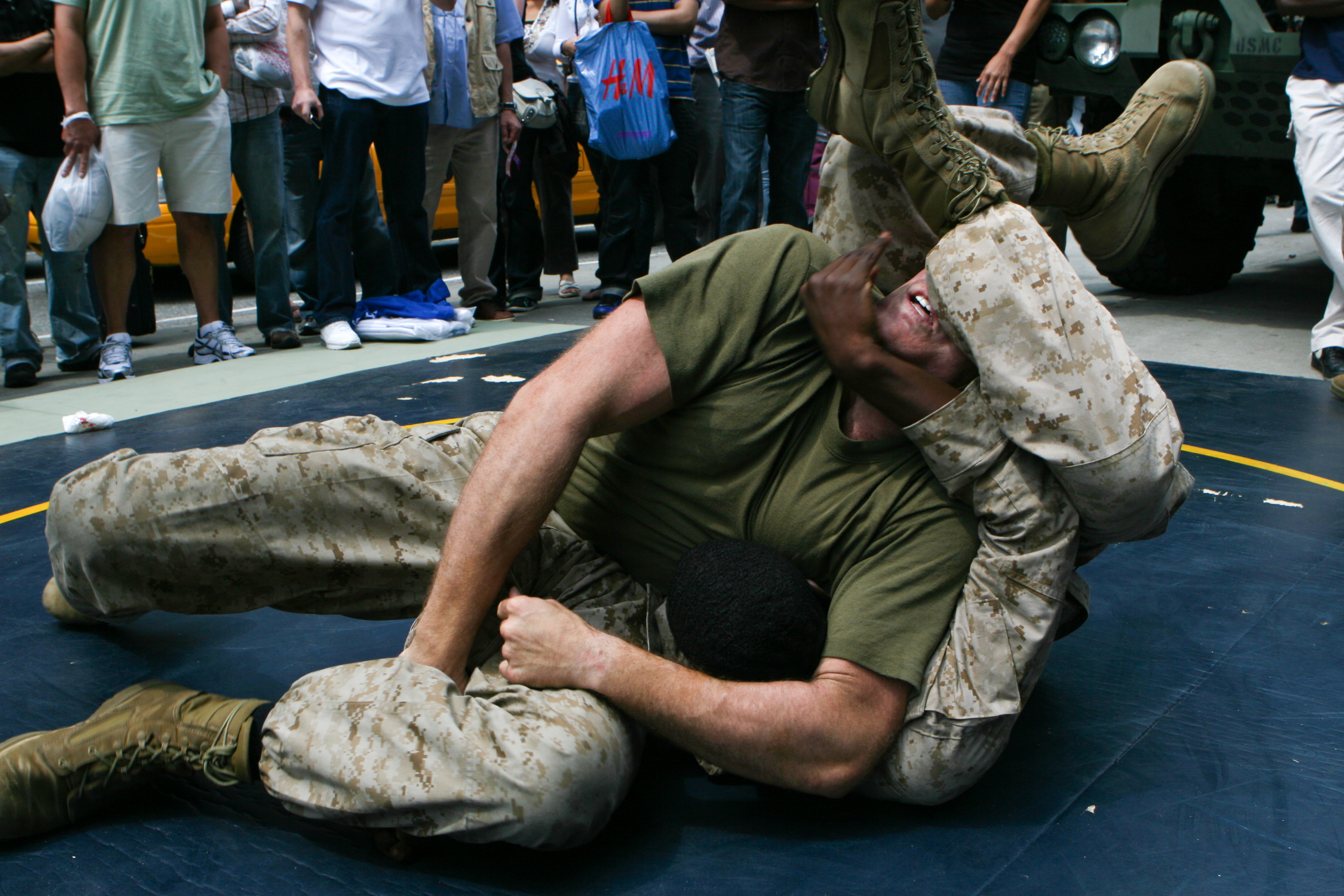
A gogoplata setup while being side-mounted by an opponent

The gogoplata is executed from a guard, commonly from a "rubber guard," where the legs are held very high against the opponent's upper back. The fighter then slips one foot in front of the opponent's head and under his chin, locks his hands behind the opponent's head, and chokes the opponent by pressing his shin or instep against the opponent's trachea. A variation called a Locoplata (popularized by Eddie Bravo) is when the practitioner uses his free foot to push up on the choking foot and increase pressure on the trachea.

== Use in mixed martial arts ==
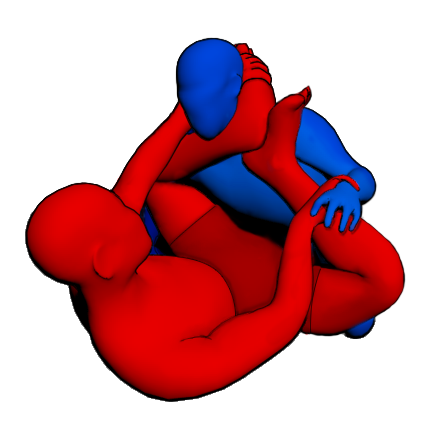
Gogoplata variation (Locoplata)

The Gogoplata is a rarely used submission in mixed martial arts.

Elvis Sinosic performed the first recorded gogoplata against Kiyoshi Tamura at Cage Combat Australia in 1997. Ryusuke "Jack" Uemura is the fighter who performed the first successful gogoplata in mixed martial arts, it occurred in his match against Isao Terada at Zst Grand Prix 2, Final Round, on January 23, 2005. Former UFC Heavyweight fighter Brad Imes calls himself "Mr. Gogoplata," after winning two matches in a row with the maneuver. Nick Diaz defeated Takanori Gomi using the gogoplata at Pride 33, only to have the victory vacated to a NC due to positive test for marijuana in the post-fight drug test.

== Use in professional wrestling ==
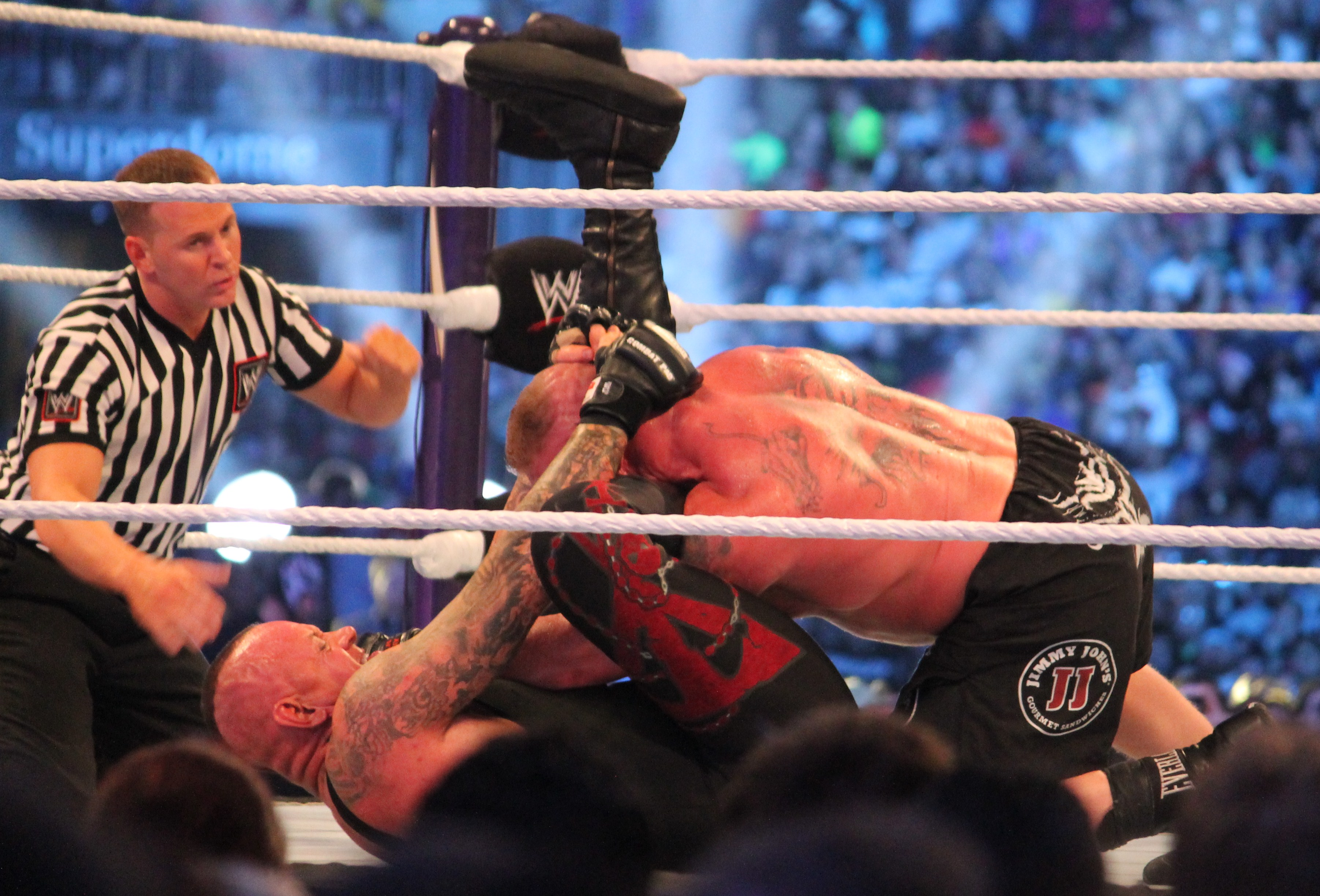
The Undertaker using a variation of gogoplata on Brock Lesnar at WrestleMania XXX.

WWE professional wrestler The Undertaker began using a variation of the move in January 2008 on SmackDown against Big Daddy V, which would cause Big Daddy V and other opponents to sometimes spit blood from their mouths. SmackDown General Manager Vickie Guerrero would later ban the move for the protection of the other wrestlers (kayfabe) and strip Undertaker of the World Heavyweight Championship as punishment for its use. The move, now called the Hell's Gate, had since become a regular part of The Undertaker's matches until his retirement in November 2020. During the World Heavyweight Championship match at Breaking Point, Theodore Long overruled CM Punk's submission to the move and forced a continuation, citing Guerrero's ban. The ban was eventually lifted in 2009.

During the main event of SummerSlam 2015, using a distraction of his opponent Brock Lesnar, The Undertaker locked in Hell's Gate after using a low blow, causing Lesnar to pass out to the move, ending the match by referee decision. It is performed by the Undertaker by putting his right shin on his opponent's throat, and both palms of his hands on the back of their head.
