= Kimura Nova União =

Brazilian sports schools focused on Brazilian jiu-jitsu

Kimura Nova União is a set of Brazilian sports schools focused on Brazilian jiu-jitsu, submission wrestling and MMA with branches in Brazil, United States, Japan, Switzerland and Norway founded on 12 October 1993 in Natal, Rio Grande do Norte. Since November 1997, the school, that was called only Kimura, united with the Nova União and took its current name. It was champion of that World Cup of Jiu-Jitsu of 2004. Some of the notable students are Renan Barão, Ronny Markes and Gleison Tibau.

== Notable Match Outcomes ==
=== Brazilian Jiu-Jitsu ===
- First place in the Brazil North-Northeast Professional Jiu-Jitsu Championship (João Pessoa - State of Paraíba), 2011

=== MMA ===
- 18 wins of the athlete Renan Barão in UFC
- Silver medal of Marius Håkonsen in the 2015 European IMMAF MMA Championship
- Victory of Caio Alencar and Jussier Formiga in Shooto Brasil 25, 2011
- Victory of Ciro Bad Boy in the eighth edition of the Octagon Fight

== See also ==
- Brazilian Jiu-Jitsu
- Jiu-jitsu
- Martial arts
- Mixed martial arts
