= Brylan Van Artsdalen =

American mixed martial arts fighter

- Born: August 14, 1984 (age 42); Palmyra, New Jersey, United States
- Nationality: American
- Height: 5 ft 8 in (1.73 m)
- Weight: 146 lb (66 kg; 10.4 st)
- Division: Lightweight; Featherweight
- Reach: 67.0 in (170 cm)
- Fighting out of: Philadelphia, Pennsylvania, United States
- Team: Daddis Mixed Martial Arts Academy
- Years active: 2010–present

Mixed martial arts record
- Total: 21
- Wins: 9
- By knockout: 1
- By submission: 8
- Losses: 12
- By submission: 12

Other information
- Mixed martial arts record from Sherdog

Brylan Van Artsdalen (born August 14, 1984) is an American mixed martial artist currently competing in the Featherweight division. A professional competitor since 2010, Van Artsdalen has formerly competed for Bellator and CES MMA.

== Mixed martial arts career ==
=== Bellator MMA ===
Van Artsdalen made his professional and Bellator debut against Rich de los Reyes on April 22, 2010 at Bellator 15. Van Artsdalen lost the fight via rear-naked choke submission in the second round.

Van Artsdalen would then go on to win his next five bouts in smaller promotions before returning to Bellator and facing Joel Roberts at Bellator 49 on September 10, 2011. Van Artsdalen lost the fight via triangle choke submission in the second round.

Van Artsdalen quickly returned and faced Scott Heckman at Bellator 59 on November 26, 2011. He lost the fight via first-round guillotine choke submission.

Van Artsdalen was defeated by Neil Johnson via rear-naked choke at Bellator 71 before claiming his first win for the promotion via guillotine choke submission versus Jay Haas at Bellator 74 on September 28, 2012.

Van Artsdalen faced Terrell Hobbs at Bellator 83 on December 7, 2012. He lost the fight via rear-naked choke submission in the first round.

On April 4, 2013, Van Artsdalen faced Kevin Roddy at Bellator 95. Van Artsdalen lost the fight via armbar submission in the second round.

Van Artsdalen replaced Andrew Calandrelli to face fellow Bellator veteran Ryan Quinn at Bellator 98 on September 7, 2013. Van Artsdalen was defeated by Quinn via arm-triangle choke submission in the first round.

== Mixed martial arts record ==
Professional record breakdown
21 matches	9 wins	12 losses
By knockout	1	0
By submission	8	12
By decision	0	0
Draws	0	

Res.	Record	Opponent	Method	Event	Date	Round	Time	Location	Notes
Loss	9-12	Matthew DiMarcantonio	Submission (kimura)	GPG 21: Fighting for Autism	July 25, 2015	1	3:03	Pennsauken Township, New Jersey, United States	
Win	9–11	Steve McCabe	Submission (neck crank)	Matrix Fights 9	December 5, 2014	1	1:34	Philadelphia, Pennsylvania, United States	
Loss	8–11	Justin Steave	Submission (guillotine choke)	Pinnacle FC: Pittsburgh Challenge Series 7	May 24, 2014	1	0:57	Pittsburgh, Pennsylvania, United States	
Loss	8–10	Charles Rosa	Submission (armbar)	CES MMA 22	March 14, 2014	1	3:25	Lincoln, Rhode Island, United States	Return to Featherweight.
Loss	8–9	Joshua Killion	Submission (rear-naked choke)	Matrix Fights 8	September 20, 2013	2	3:11	Philadelphia, Pennsylvania, United States	Catchweight (140 lb) bout.
Loss	8–8	Ryan Quinn	Submission (arm-triangle choke)	Bellator 98	September 7, 2013	1	2:34	Uncasville, Connecticut, United States	Lightweight debut.
Loss	8–7	Lester Caslow	Submission (rear-naked choke)	CFFC 26: Sullivan vs. Martinez	August 17, 2013	1	3:55	Atlantic City, New Jersey, United States	Catchweight (150 lb) bout.
Win	8–6	Justin Dalton	TKO (shoulder injury)	XFE: Cage Wars 23	June 1, 2013	1	0:43	Chester, Pennsylvania, United States	
Loss	7–6	Kevin Roddy	Submission (armbar)	Bellator 95	April 4, 2013	2	1:04	Atlantic City, New Jersey, United States	
Loss	7–5	Terrell Hobbs	Submission (rear-naked choke)	Bellator 83	December 7, 2012	1	3:07	Atlantic City, New Jersey, United States	
Win	7–4	Jay Haas	Submission (guillotine choke)	Bellator 74	September 28, 2012	1	1:03	Atlantic City, New Jersey, United States	
Loss	6–4	Neil Johnson	Submission (rear-naked choke)	Bellator 71	June 22, 2012	2	4:29	Chester, West Virginia, United States	
Win	6–3	Billy Vaughan	Submission (D'arce choke)	Matrix Fights 5	March 16, 2012	1	2:00	Philadelphia, Pennsylvania, United States	
Loss	5–3	Scott Heckman	Submission (guillotine choke)	Bellator 59	November 26, 2011	1	1:38	Atlantic City, New Jersey, United States	
Loss	5–2	Joel Roberts	Technical Submission (triangle choke)	Bellator 49	September 10, 2011	2	1:47	Atlantic City, New Jersey, United States	
Win	5–1	Anthony Leone	Technical Submission (guillotine choke)	XFE - Cage Wars 8: House of Pain	July 29, 2011	1	1:45	Atlantic City, New Jersey, United States	
Win	4–1	Brett Ewing	Submission (anaconda choke)	Matrix Fights 4	April 22, 2011	1	2:21	Philadelphia, Pennsylvania, United States	
Win	3–1	Patrick White	Submission (arm-triangle choke)	Xtreme Fight Events: Cage Wars 5	March 11, 2011	1	4:15	Chester, Pennsylvania, United States	
Win	2–1	Julio Rosario	Submission (rear-naked choke)	Matrix Fights 3	October 29, 2010	2	2:22	Philadelphia, Pennsylvania, United States	
Win	1–1	Shane Hutchinson	Submission (anaconda choke)	Matrix Fights 2	June 11, 2010	1	0:15	Philadelphia, Pennsylvania, United States	
Loss	0–1	Rich de los Reyes	Submission (rear-naked choke)	Bellator 15	April 22, 2010	2	2:03	Uncasville, Connecticut, United States	
