= Willamy Freire =

Brazilian mixed martial arts fighter

- Born: 28 July 1987 (age 39); Fortaleza, Ceará, Brazil
- Nickname: Chiquerim
- Height: 5 ft 8 in (1.73 m)
- Weight: 155 lb (70 kg; 11.1 st)
- Division: Lightweight
- Fighting out of: Fortaleza, Ceará, Brazil
- Team: Nova Uniao; Completa Team

Mixed martial arts record
- Total: 32
- Wins: 26
- By knockout: 8
- By submission: 10
- By decision: 7
- Unknown: 1
- Losses: 6
- By knockout: 1
- By submission: 2
- By decision: 3

Other information
- Mixed martial arts record from Sherdog

Willamy Freire (born July 28, 1987) is a Brazilian professional mixed martial artist who has fought for Shooto and the Ultimate Fighting Championship. Freire was also the Shooto Welterweight Champion.

== Mixed martial arts career ==
=== Early career ===
Freire compiled a 12–2 record prior to signing with Shooto. This included a 1–1 record against Jose Luis Nogueira and a 4-fight grand prix tournament victory held over the course of one night.

=== Shooto ===
Freire was scheduled to face Peter Angerer for the SHIDO MMA Welterweight Championship in May 2007. However, just prior to the fight, he was knocked unconscious in training and suffered a deep cut, so he had to withdraw. In July 2007, Freire made his Shooto debut against Hacran Dias, his future Nova Uniao team-mate. Freire lost via unanimous decision. This was his final defeat before an 11 fight win streak, prior to joining the UFC.

After the Shooto Welterweight Championship was vacated, Freire faced Kenichiro Togashi for the title. After 2:05 of the first round, Freire was declared the winner via TKO (doctor stoppage), gaining him the title.

After a non-title fight against Mikael Lähdesmäki, which Freire won via unanimous decision, Freire faced Yusuke Endo for the second time in his first title defence. Freire was declared the winner via split decision (29–28, 28–29, 29–27) and immediately vacated the title, as he had already signed with the UFC.

=== Ultimate Fighting Championship ===
Freire signed with the Ultimate Fighting Championship which was announced in June 2010. He was scheduled to make his debut against Thiago Tavares at UFC Live: Jones vs. Matyushenko in August, but would later withdraw with injury. Since Tavares was left without an opponent, he too was pulled from the event.

In November 2010, Freire was cleared to compete after recovering from his knee injury. Freire faced Waylon Lowe in his UFC debut on January 22, 2011, at UFC Fight Night 23. He lost the fight via unanimous decision and will be out indefinitely after injuring his right hand and right cheekbone.

Freire was released from the UFC following this loss.

=== DREAM ===
Freire was expected to face Shinya Aoki on May 29, 2011, at DREAM Fight for Japan!. The fight was called off due to visa issues. Freire was set to fight Tatsuya Kawajiri on July 16, 2011, at Dream.17 but a hand injury forced him off the card.

Freire ultimately made his DREAM debut at Dream 17 against Satoru Kitaoka. He lost the fight via split decision.

== Championships and accomplishments ==
- Shooto
  - Shooto Welterweight (154 lbs.) Championship (One time)

== Mixed martial arts record ==
Professional record breakdown
32 matches	26 wins	6 losses
By knockout	8	1
By submission	10	2
By decision	7	3
Unknown	1	0

Res.	Record	Opponent	Method	Event	Date	Round	Time	Location	Notes
Win	26–6	Paulo Dantas	DQ (faked knee to groin)	Brazilian King Fighter 3	November 7, 2013	1	N/A	Fortaleza, Brazil	
Loss	25–6	Joao Luiz Nogueira	TKO (punches)	OX MMA	August 8, 2013	2	0:27	Fortaleza, Brazil	
Win	25–5	Zozimar de Oliveira Silva Jr.	Submission (guillotine choke)	Brazilian King Fighter	May 17, 2012	2	1:45	Fortaleza, Brazil	
Loss	24–5	Satoru Kitaoka	Decision (split)	Dream 17	September 24, 2011	3	5:00	Saitama, Saitama, Japan	
Loss	24–4	Waylon Lowe	Decision (unanimous)	UFC: Fight For The Troops 2	January 22, 2011	3	5:00	Fort Hood, Texas, United States	
Win	24–3	Yusuke Endo	Decision (split)	Shooto: The Way of Shooto 3: Like a Tiger, Like a Dragon	May 30, 2010	3	5:00	Tokyo, Japan	Defended Shooto Welterweight (154 lbs.) Championship; Later vacated title.
Win	23–3	Mikael Lähdesmäki	Decision (unanimous)	Shooto - Brazil 15	March 19, 2010	3	5:00	Rio de Janeiro, Brazil	
Win	22–3	Kenichiro Togashi	TKO (doctor stoppage)	Vale Tudo Japan 2009	October 30, 2009	1	2:05	Tokyo, Japan	Won Shooto Welterweight (154 lbs.) Championship
Win	21–3	Vincent Latoel	Submission (guillotine choke)	Shooto - The Way of Shooto 3	August 27, 2009	2	2:59	Fortaleza, Brazil	
Win	20–3	Yusuke Endo	Submission (guillotine choke)	Shooto: Shooto Tradition Final	May 10, 2009	1	5:00	Tokyo, Japan	
Win	19–3	Randy Steinke	Submission (D'arce choke)	Shooto - Brazil 9	November 29, 2008	1	3:18	Fortaleza, Brazil	
Win	18–3	Mateus Machado	Submission (guillotine choke)	Shooto - Brazil 8	August 30, 2008	1	1:25	Rio de Janeiro, Brazil	
Win	17–3	Giovani Diniz	KO (punch)	Shooto - Brazil 6	April 19, 2008	2	4:50	Rio de Janeiro, Brazil	
Win	16–3	Ari Craupina	Submission (arm triangle choke)	Kabra Fight Nordeste	March 13, 2008	1	N/A	Fortaleza, Brazil	
Win	15–3	Claudiere Freitas	Decision (unanimous)	Shooto - Brazil 5	January 26, 2008	3	5:00	Rio de Janeiro, Brazil	
Win	14–3	Daniel Silveira	TKO (punches)	MZI - Combat 2	November 24, 2007	1	N/A	Caico, Brazil	
Win	13–3	Patricky Freire	Technical Decision (majority)	Rino's FC 4	September 27, 2007	3	1:45	Fortaleza, Brazil	
Loss	12–3	Hacran Dias	Decision (unanimous)	Shooto - Brazil 3	July 7, 2007	3	5:00	Rio de Janeiro, Brazil	
Win	12–2	Paulo Dantas	Submission (rear naked choke)	Ceará Vale Tudo Meeting	April 18, 2007	3	2:44	Fortaleza, Brazil	
Win	11–2	Gasparzinho	TKO (retirement)	Rino's FC 3	February 7, 2007	N/A	N/A	Recife, Brazil	
Win	10–2	Rafael Bastos	Submission (north-south choke)	Predador FC 4 - Kamae	January 25, 2007	1	N/A	Fortaleza, Brazil	
Win	9–2	Phillip Schade	Decision (unanimous)	UCS - Fighting Day 3	December 2, 2006	3	5:00	Geislingen, Germany	
Loss	8–2	Joao Luiz Nogueira	Submission (guillotine choke)	Tridenium Combat	April 6, 2006	1	4:50	Fortaleza, Brazil	
Win	8–1	Joao Luiz Nogueira	Decision (unanimous)	Bad Boy Championship	December 8, 2005	3	5:00	Fortaleza, Brazil	
Win	7–1	Erivan Silva	Submission (punches)	MZIF - MZI Fight	November 22, 2005	2	2:58	Rio Grande do Norte, Brazil	
Loss	6–1	Helman PQD	Submission (rear naked choke)	MF - Mossoro Fight	August 26, 2005	3	2:25	Mossoro, Brazil	
Win	6–0	Carlos Heide	TKO (punches)	COVT - Ceará Open Vale Tudo 2	March 10, 2005	3	5:00	Fortaleza, Brazil	
Win	5–0	David Oliveira	TKO (punches)	Champions Fight	October 25, 2003	2	N/A	Paraíba, Brazil	
Win	4–0	Cesar da Costa Alencar	Decision (split)	Quixada Open Vale Tudo - Grand Prix	November 22, 2002	2	5:00	Quixada, Ceará, Brazil	
Win	3–0	Glauber do Santos Silveira	TKO (doctor stoppage)	Quixada Open Vale Tudo - Grand Prix	November 22, 2002	2	N/A	Quixada, Ceará, Brazil	
Win	2–0	Francisco Diego	TKO (knee and punches)	Quixada Open Vale Tudo - Grand Prix	November 22, 2002	1	N/A	Quixada, Ceará, Brazil	
Win	1–0	Gesias Cavalcante Crispim	Submission (rear naked choke)	Quixada Open Vale Tudo - Grand Prix	November 22, 2002	3	N/A	Quixada, Ceará, Brazil	
