= 2001 World Jiu-Jitsu Championship =

Brazilian Jiu-Jitsu competitions

- Venue: Tijuca Tênis Clube
- Location: Rio de Janeiro, Brazil
- Dates: 29 July 2001
- Website: IBJJF

The 2001 World Jiu-Jitsu Championship was held at Tijuca Tênis Clube, Rio de Janeiro, Brazil.

== Teams results ==
Results by Academy

Rank	Men's division	
Rank	Team	Points
1	Nova União	n/a
2	Gracie Barra	n/a
3	Brazilian Top Team	n/a

Rank	Women's division	
Rank	Team	Points
1	Gracie Barra	n/a
2	Nova União	n/a
3	Equipe III	n/a
