= Rubber guard =

Grappling technique

Rubber Guard
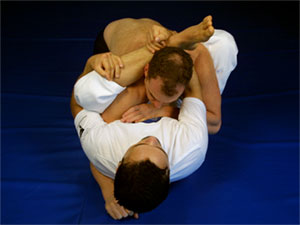
- Eddie Bravo controlling his opponent in the New York position of the Rubber Guard.
- Classification: Position
- Style: 10th Planet Jiu-Jitsu
- Parent hold: Guard (grappling)
- Child hold(s): Mission Control, New York, Chill Dog, New Jersey
- Attacks: Gogoplata, Omoplata, Armbar, Triangle Choke, Hazelett, Carnie, Dead Orchard

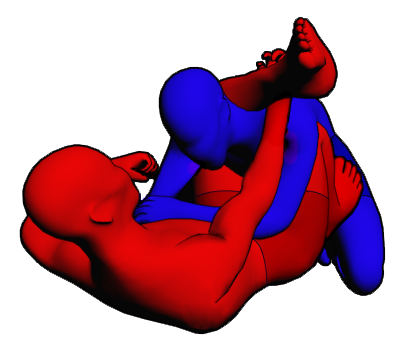
Rubber Guard diagram, a red figure holding blue figure in the rubber guard.

Rubber guard is a Brazilian Jiu-jitsu technique, which involves the practitioner ‘breaking down’ the posture of the opponent to enter into rubber guard, while maintaining a high level of control. It utilizes extensive flexibility to control the opponent with one arm and one leg. The opposite arm in turn is free to attempt submissions, sweeps or to strike the trapped head of the opponent.

Rubber guard, as well as other innovative guard moves, is attributed to Eddie Bravo who adopted it as a staple technique of his 10th Planet Jiu-Jitsu. Modern variations of the Rubber guard have been created in the gi, with the Gubber guard being used by Keenan Cornelius. This is a similar set up to the Rubber guard but involves the use of the lapel to control the opponent's posture.

== Flowchart ==
In the 10th Planet system, the rubber guard follows a flow pattern resembling a branching path or programmatic flowchart; containing six basic "levels" each comprising a primary option and two secondary options.

Rubber Guard flow chart adapted from chart in Mastering the Rubber Guard

== See also ==
- Guard (grappling)
- Gogoplata
