= Eddie Bravo =

American martial artist (born 1970)

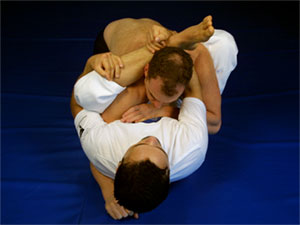
- Eddie Bravo (down) demonstrating his signature "rubber guard"
- Born: Edgar A. Cano; May 15, 1970 (age 56); Santa Ana, California, U.S.
- Other names: Edgy Brah, The Twister, Look into it
- Height: 5 ft 7.5 in (171 cm)
- Weight: 183 lb (83 kg; 13 st 1 lb)
- Rank: 4th degree black belt in BJJ under Jean Jacques Machado

Other information
- Website: https://eddie-bravo.com/

Edgar A. Bravo (né Cano; born May 15, 1970) is an American martial arts instructor, podcaster, stand-up comedian, and musician. After earning a black belt in Brazilian Jiu-Jitsu in 2003, Bravo began teaching his own self-developed style of jiu-jitsu and founded 10th Planet Jiu Jitsu. He is also the creator of the Eddie Bravo Invitational (EBI) grappling competition and the EBI ruleset. He is a recurring guest on The Joe Rogan Experience and the Tin Foil Hat Podcast.

== Early life and education ==
Edgar A. Cano was born on May 15, 1970. He later legally changed his surname to Bravo, the name of his stepfather. Both of his biological parents are Mexican. Growing up, Bravo took to music and started to play the drums and guitar. He formed several bands with aspirations of becoming a famous musician. Bravo also developed an interest in athletics playing American football and joining his high school's wrestling team.

In 1991, Bravo moved to Hollywood, California to pursue a music career, and formed a band titled Blackened Kill Symphony. He got a gym membership as he wanted to avoid "looking like a slob" while performing but only visited twice. Bravo then began taking karate classes. In 1994, after watching Royce Gracie win an Ultimate Fighting Championship (UFC) event, Bravo decided to become a Brazilian jiu-jitsu practitioner, which he began under the tutelage of Jean Jacques Machado. Bravo also attended a Jeet Kune Do academy from 1996 to 1998.

== Brazilian jiu-jitsu ==
In 1998, Bravo decided to stop attending other martial arts schools to focus solely on Brazilian jiu-jitsu. Around this time, he received a blue belt and started developing ways to finish opponents with a "Twister", a specific spinal lock submission hold. In 1999, Bravo earned a purple belt and began developing his signature guard, the rubber guard.

In 2003, Bravo entered the 145 lbs/66 kg division of the Abu-Dhabi Combat Club (ADCC) Submission Wrestling World Championship as a brown belt after winning the North American trials. Bravo defeated Gustavo Dantas in the elimination round by rear naked choke in what was considered an upset.

Bravo then faced four-time world champion and three-time ADCC champion Royler Gracie in the quarter-finals. Bravo traded comfortably top positions with Gracie throughout the match before deploying his game of rubber guard, and eventually winning via a triangle choke after just under 9 minutes. Bravo would then lose to eventual-tournament champion Léo Vieira in the semi-finals.

Upon his return to the United States after the competition, he was awarded a black belt by Jean Jacques Machado and subsequently opened his first 10th Planet Jiu-Jitsu school in Los Angeles, California, a no-gi jiu-jitsu system.

In 2014, after having both retired from competition for years, Bravo and Royler Gracie agreed to have another grappling contest. It was a twenty-minute submission-only match which took place at Metamoris III. The contest started with Bravo pulling quarter guard and defending Royler's top attacks before reversing to an offensive attack around the eight-minute mark. After a few reversals from both competitors, Bravo was able to deploy a series of techniques from half guard, and put Gracie into an "electric chair" maneuver. In the closing minutes, Bravo had Gracie in a calf slicer but Gracie declined to tap as time ran out and, thus, the match was ruled a draw.

=== Promotional career ===
Also in 2014, Bravo founded the Eddie Bravo Invitational (EBI), a no-gi submission-only grappling tournament. In 2016, it was announced that the EBI and UFC partnered together to feature EBI events on the UFC's streaming service Fight Pass. Later, Bravo also introduced Combat Jiu-Jitsu to his events; an altered form of submission grappling which allows open-hand strikes while on the ground.

After EBI 17 on September 29, 2018, Bravo took a break from running the organization and instead devoted his time to developing Combat Jiu-Jitsu. It was then that he began holding the Combat Jiu-Jitsu World Championships and continues to do so today. After several editions of the CJJ World Championship, Bravo announced that the Eddie Bravo Invitational would be returning in 2022 for the first event in almost four years.

At the same time, Bravo embarked on a new project that would combine both the EBI and CJJ rulesets into a single event that would be available exclusively to female competitors. The result was Medusa Female-Only Jiu-Jitsu, which ran their first successful event on October 2, 2021, featuring an EBI Strawweight tournament and a CJJ Bantamweight tournament.

Bravo staged the first official EBI Open Tournament on June 17, 2024, in El Paso, Texas. Bravo also created Jiu-Jitsu Overdose, a week-long celebration of grappling featuring events by all of his existing promotions, and scheduled the inaugural event for December 11 to 16, 2024.

=== Instructor lineage ===
Mitsuyo Maeda → Carlos Gracie Sr. → Carlos Gracie Jr. → Jean Jacques Machado → Eddie Bravo

== Submission grappling record ==
7 Matches, 5 Wins (3 Submissions), 1 Loss, 1 Draw
Result	Rec.	Opponent	Method	Event	Division	Date	Location
Draw	5–1–1	Royler Gracie	Draw	Metamoris 3	Catchweight	March 29, 2014	Los Angeles, CA
Loss	5–1	Leo Vieira	Points	ADCC World Championship	-66 kg	May 18, 2003	São Paulo
Win	5–0	Royler Gracie	Submission (triangle choke)	ADCC World Championship	-66 kg	May 17, 2003	São Paulo
Win	4–0	Gustavo Dantas	Submission (rear-naked choke)	ADCC World Championship	-66 kg	May 17, 2003	São Paulo
Win	3–0	Alan Teo	Points	ADCC North American Championship	-66 kg	October 5, 2002	Los Angeles, CA
Win	2–0	Shawn Krysa	Points	ADCC North American Championship	-66 kg	October 5, 2002	Los Angeles, CA
Win	1–0	Mark Ashton	Submission (rear-naked choke)	ADCC North American Championship	-66 kg	October 5, 2002	Los Angeles, CA

== Personal life ==
Bravo has one son born in 2012.

Bravo is an outspoken marijuana advocate, crediting in 2006 some of his early success, like his invention of the Rubber Guard, with his regular marijuana usage.

Bravo is credited with the naming and creation of the Banana Split submission hold.

A provocateur and Joe Rogan podcast regular, he has been known to be a fan of conspiracy theories, such as flat Earth, one world government, and 9/11 controlled demolition conspiracy theories. He also has his own podcast called Look Into It, where he talks with "red pilled" martial arts stars, comedians, rock stars and conspiracy theorists.

== Media ==
=== Books ===
- Jiu Jitsu Unleashed (2005)
- Mastering the Rubber Guard (2006)
- Mastering the Twister (2007)
- Advanced Rubber Guard (2014)

=== DVDs ===
- The Twister
- Mastering the Rubber Guard
- Mastering the Twister

=== Filmography ===
Year	Title	Role
2001	Life in the Cage	Himself
2007	American Drug War: The Last White Hope	Himself
2008	Inside MMA	Himself
2009	MMA Worldwide	Himself
2011	Never Back Down 2: The Beatdown	D.J. Bravo
2011	Human Weapon	Himself
2012	The Roots of Fight	Himself
2014	LatiNation	Himself
2015	Jiu-Jitsu vs The World	Himself

== See also ==
- List of Brazilian jiu-jitsu practitioners
