= UFC: Fight for the Troops 2 =

UFC mixed martial arts event in 2011

- The poster for UFC: Fight for the Troops 2
- Promotion: Ultimate Fighting Championship
- Date: January 22, 2011
- Venue: Fort Hood
- City: Killeen, Texas
- Attendance: 3,200

Event chronology
UFC 125: Resolution	UFC: Fight for the Troops 2	UFC 126: Silva vs. Belfort

UFC: Fight for the Troops 2 (also known as UFC Fight Night 23) was a mixed martial arts event held by the Ultimate Fighting Championship on January 22, 2011 at Fort Hood, near Killeen, Texas. The event was the third that the UFC has hosted in cooperation with a US military base, following UFC Fight Night 7 and UFC: Fight for the Troops.

== Background ==
The bout between Kenny Florian and Evan Dunham was expected for UFC 126, but was moved to this card to serve as the main event. On December 6, however, Florian pulled out of the bout due to a knee injury. Melvin Guillard was pulled from a planned preliminary bout with Yves Edwards and faced Dunham in the main event. Edwards instead faced TUF 12 alumnus Cody McKenzie.

On December 30, 2010, a bout between Mike Swick and David Mitchell was called off due to Mitchell suffering an injury and Swick dealing with his Esophageal Condition. A late replacement fight between Will Campuzano and Chris Cariaso was signed.

A lightweight bout between Cole Miller and Matt Wiman, which was originally scheduled to take place at UFC 125, was moved to this event.

Rani Yahya was expected to face Chan Sung Jung at this event, but Jung was forced from the card with an injury, and replaced by Mike Brown.

On January 11, 2011, Dana White announced that if Mark Hominick defeated George Roop at this event, he would become the top contender for the UFC Featherweight Championship and would face champion José Aldo at UFC 129.

On January 18, Dana White announced that the UFC would be streaming the McKenzie vs. Edwards and Johnson vs. Guymon fights for free on their official Facebook page. However, on the night of the fights, UFC.com officials announced that four prelims would show, adding the Freire vs. Lowe and Brown vs. Yahya fights.

== Results ==
Main card
Weight class				Method	Round	Time	Notes
Lightweight	Melvin Guillard	def.	Evan Dunham	TKO (knees)	1	2:58
Heavyweight	Matt Mitrione	def.	Tim Hague	TKO (punches)	1	2:59
Featherweight	Mark Hominick	def.	George Roop	TKO (punches)	1	1:28	(Note: UFC Featherweight Championship title eliminator for Hominick)
Heavyweight	Pat Barry	def.	Joey Beltran	Decision (unanimous) (30–27, 29–28, 29–28)	3	5:00
Lightweight	Matt Wiman	def.	Cole Miller	Decision (unanimous) (29–28, 30–27, 30–27)	3	5:00
Facebook
Lightweight	Yves Edwards	def.	Cody McKenzie	Technical Submission (rear-naked choke)	2	4:33	(Note: This bout aired on the broadcast following the Johnson vs Guymon bout.)
Welterweight	DaMarques Johnson	def.	Mike Guymon	Verbal Submission (body triangle)	1	3:22	(Note: This bout aired on the broadcast following the Barry vs Beltran bout.)
Featherweight	Rani Yahya	def.	Mike Brown	Decision (unanimous) (30–27, 29–28, 29–28)	3	5:00	(Note: This bout aired on the broadcast following the Hominick vs Roop bout.)
Lightweight	Waylon Lowe	def.	Willamy Freire	Decision (unanimous) (29–28, 29–28, 29–28)	3	5:00
Preliminary card
Welterweight	Charlie Brenneman	def.	Amilcar Alves	Decision (unanimous) (30–27, 30–27, 30–27)	3	5:00
Bantamweight	Chris Cariaso	def.	Will Campuzano	Decision (unanimous) (29–28, 29–28, 29–28)	3	5:00

== Bonus Awards ==
The following fighters received $30,000 bonuses.

- Fight of the Night: Yves Edwards vs. Cody McKenzie
- Knockout of the Night: Melvin Guillard
- Submission of the Night: Yves Edwards
