= Renan Barão =

Brazilian mixed martial artist

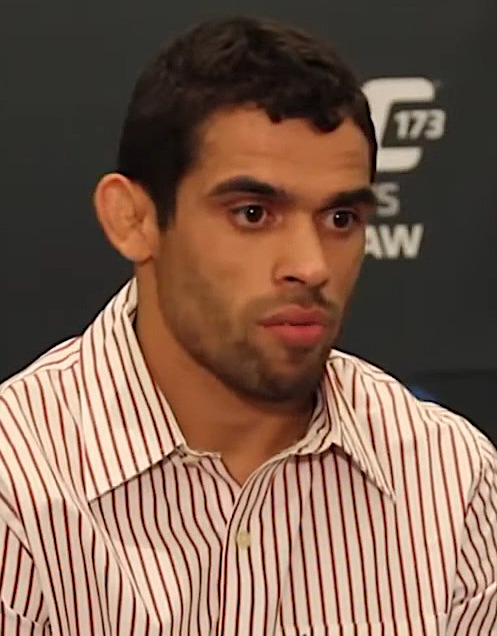
- Barão in 2014
- Born: Renan do Nascimento Mota Pegado; 31 January 1987 (age 39); Natal, Rio Grande do Norte, Brazil
- Other names: The Baron
- Height: 5 ft 7 in (1.70 m)
- Weight: 135 lb (61 kg; 9 st 9 lb)
- Division: Bantamweight (2007–2015, 2018); Featherweight (2005–2007, 2016–2017, 2019); Flyweight (2005); Lightweight (2008)
- Reach: 70 in (178 cm)
- Fighting out of: Rio de Janeiro, Brazil
- Team: Nova União (2005–2017); American Top Team (2017–2020); Pitbull Brothers (2020–present)
- Rank: Black belt in Brazilian jiu-jitsu under André Pederneiras
- Years active: 2005–present

Mixed martial arts record
- Total: 45
- Wins: 34
- By knockout: 8
- By submission: 15
- By decision: 11
- Losses: 10
- By knockout: 3
- By decision: 7
- No contests: 1

Other information
- Mixed martial arts record from Sherdog

Renan do Nascimento Mota Pegado (born 31 January 1987), known as Renan Barão, is a Brazilian professional mixed martial artist and a former UFC Bantamweight Champion. According to Fight Matrix, Barão holds the third longest unbeaten streak in MMA history, which lasted from 2005 to 2014. During his championship reign, he was ranked as a top three pound-for-pound fighter and regarded as one of the best mixed martial artists in the world.

== Background ==
Barão was born into a poor family of 13 in Natal, Brazil. His parents divorced when he was young, and he was raised mostly by his mother, aunt and grandmother. Following the divorce, Barão would meet his father – who was an accomplished boxer – next time when he was a teen. Inspired by his father, Barão would instantly start training in combat sports. His nickname Barão (baron), which predates his athletic career, was given to him by his grandmother after a character in the 1986 Brazilian soap opera Sinhá Moça.

== Mixed martial arts career ==
He started his career in Kimura Nova União, a sports school in Natal, Rio Grande do Norte, Brazil. Since turning professional in 2005, Barão has competed for Shooto Brazil and other smaller organizations in his native country of Brazil, having fought Rony Mariano Bezerra and Anistavio "Gasparzinho" Medeiros both former The Ultimate Fighter: Brazil contestants. He is a teammate and training partner of former WEC Featherweight Champion and former UFC Featherweight Champion José Aldo at Nova União. He received his Brazilian jiu-jitsu black belt from André Pederneiras in September 2011 becoming the 100th black belt under Pederneiras in the process.

In January 2010, Sherdog named him their top prospect in their list of "10 Brazilians to watch in 2010"

=== World Extreme Cagefighting ===
Barão was expected to make his North American, as well as WEC debut in a Bantamweight bout against Clint Godfrey on 20 June 2010 at WEC 49, but Godfrey was forced from the card with an injury. Barão instead faced fellow WEC newcomer Anthony Leone at an agreed 142 lb catchweight. Barão defeated Leone via submission (armbar) in the third round.

Barão defeated Chris Cariaso by rear-naked choke submission in the first round on 16 December 2010 at WEC 53.

=== Ultimate Fighting Championship & Interim UFC Bantamweight Championship ===
In October 2010, the WEC merged with the UFC. As part of the merger, all WEC fighters were transferred to the UFC.

Barão was expected to make his UFC debut on 28 May 2011 against Demetrious Johnson at UFC 130, but an undisclosed injury forced Brad Pickett out of his fight with Miguel Torres on the same card. Johnson moved up to fight Torres, while Barão faced Cole Escovedo. Barão won his debut fight in the organization via unanimous decision.

Barão faced Brad Pickett on 5 November 2011 at UFC 138. He defeated Pickett by rear-naked choke submission in the first round, also winning Fight of the Night honors.

Barão faced Scott Jorgensen on 4 February 2012 at UFC 143. He won the fight by unanimous decision.

==== Interim Bantamweight Championship reign ====
Barão was expected to face Ivan Menjivar on 7 July 2012 at UFC 148 to possibly determine the number one contender. Barão instead faced Urijah Faber for the Interim Bantamweight title after current champion Dominick Cruz was injured. It was originally scheduled to take place at UFC 148 however, due to an injury to headliner José Aldo (who was supposed to make a title defence in the event's main event fight), the Faber/Barão bout was moved to 21 July 2012 and headlined UFC 149 for the Interim Bantamweight Championship. He won the fight via unanimous decision to become the Interim UFC Bantamweight Champion.

He was expected to face Dominick Cruz for the unified UFC Bantamweight Championship at a later date. However, it was announced on 4 December 2012 that Dominick Cruz suffered a second ACL tear that would require surgery, leaving Cruz now sidelined for 6–9 months.

In his first title defense, Barão retained the UFC Interim Bantamweight Championship against Michael McDonald on 16 February 2013 at UFC on Fuel TV: Barão vs. McDonald. McDonald was competitive with capable take-down defense and crisp boxing - particularly - in the first two rounds, but was worn down by Barão's more diverse skill-set as he mixed in knees and kicks standing, and often looked to take the fight to the floor (with success). Upon executing a strong take-down in the fourth round, McDonald tried to explode to his feet but instead gave Barão opportunity to expertly secure an arm-triangle choke while passing into side control: McDonald tapped at 3:57 in the fourth round. The win also won him his first Submission of the Night honors.

Barão was scheduled to make his second interim title defense against Eddie Wineland on 15 June 2013 at UFC 161. However, on 21 May it was confirmed that Barão had pulled out of the bout, citing a foot injury.

The bout with Wineland was rescheduled for 21 September 2013 at UFC 165. Barão retained the title with a second-round TKO victory via spinning back kick and subsequent punches to the face. With this victory Barão made history as the first and only fighter ever to defend an interim title more than once in the UFC. The win also resulted in Barão receiving his first Knockout of the Night bonus award.

=== UFC Bantamweight Champion ===
Barão was expected to face Dominick Cruz to unify the UFC Bantamweight Championship on 1 February 2014 at UFC 169. However, on a 6 January episode of SportsCenter, UFC president Dana White announced that Dominick Cruz had torn his groin, therefore being stripped of the UFC Bantamweight Championship, and Barão would become the undisputed UFC Bantamweight Champion, with his first unified title defense against Urijah Faber at UFC 169. Barão successfully defended his title by defeating Faber via TKO in the first round.

For his second title defense, Barão faced T.J. Dillashaw in the main event at UFC 173 on 24 May 2014. Barão was a huge favorite, but Dillashaw won the fight in dominant fashion out striking Barão in all five rounds, Dillashaw won via TKO in the fifth round to become the new UFC Bantamweight Champion. It was one of the greatest upsets in UFC history. The fight earned the Fight of the Night award.

=== Back to title contention ===
An immediate rematch with Dillashaw was scheduled to take place on 30 August 2014 at UFC 177. However, the day of the weigh-ins, Barão had to be admitted to the hospital as a result of his attempts to cut weight, and was removed from the card. Dillashaw eventually fought UFC newcomer Joe Soto whom he defeated by 5th-round knockout.

In his first fight since losing the title, Barão faced Mitch Gagnon on 20 December 2014 at UFC Fight Night 58. He won the fight via arm-triangle submission in the third round. The win also earned Barão his first Performance of the Night bonus award.

A rematch with Dillashaw was rescheduled and was expected to take place on 25 April 2015 at UFC 186. However a month before the event, Dillashaw was forced out of the bout after sustaining a broken rib while training.

The rematch with Dillashaw eventually took place at UFC on Fox 16 on 25 July 2015. Barão lost the fight via TKO in the opening moments of the fourth round.

=== Move back to Featherweight ===
Barão next faced Jeremy Stephens in a featherweight bout on 29 May 2016 at UFC Fight Night 88. He lost the back and forth fight by unanimous decision. Both participants were awarded Fight of the Night honors for their performance.

Barão faced Phillipe Nover on 24 September 2016 at UFC Fight Night 95. He won the fight via unanimous decision.

Barão was briefly linked to a bout with Doo Ho Choi which was expected to take place on 15 April 2017 at UFC on Fox 24. However, as the announcement of the pairing began to circulate, Choi declined the bout, and as a result, the bout never materialized.

=== Bantamweight return ===
Barão faced Aljamain Sterling on 29 July 2017 at UFC 214. The fight was initially contracted to be contested at bantamweight, however on 28 June, the CSAC announced that they would not license Barão to compete at that weight due to his past struggle to make the required weight at UFC 177. The bout with Sterling proceeded as scheduled at a catchweight of 140 lbs. Barão lost the bout by unanimous decision.

Barão faced Brian Kelleher on 24 February 2018 at UFC on Fox 28. He lost the fight by unanimous decision.

Barão faced Andre Ewell on 22 September 2018 at UFC Fight Night 137. At weigh-ins, Barão weighted five pounds over bantamweight non-title fight limit of 136 and he was fined 30 percent of his purse to Ewell. Barão lost the fight via split decision.

Barão faced Luke Sanders on 17 February 2019 at UFC on ESPN 1. At the weigh-ins, Barão weighed in at 138 pounds, 2 pounds over the bantamweight non-title fight upper limit of 136 pounds. As a result, the bout proceeded at catchweight and Barão was fined 20% of his purse which went to his opponent, Sanders. Barão lost the fight via knockout in the second round.

Barão faced Douglas Silva de Andrade in a featherweight bout on 16 November 2019 at UFC on ESPN+ 22. He lost the fight by unanimous decision.

In early December 2019, it was reported that Barão had been released from the UFC.

=== Post-UFC career ===
On 3 August 2020, news surfaced that Barão had signed a three-fight contract with Taura MMA. He was expected to make his promotional debut against Bobby Moffett at Taura MMA 12 on 21 November 2020. However, the event was postponed due to COVID-19 pandemic related issues.

Barão was scheduled to face Tyson Duckworth on 19 November 2021, at Premier FC 32 for the Premier FC Featherweight Championship. However Duckworth pulled out of the bout the day before, not getting on his flight.

Barão was scheduled to face Horacio Gutiérrez on 28 January 2022, at EFC 44, but the bout was cancelled.

Barão was scheduled to face William Gomis at ARES FC 7 on 25 June 2022. He later pulled out of the bout.

Barão was rumored to face fellow UFC-alum Sean Soriano in a bare-knuckle MMA bout at Gamebred Bareknuckle 5. However, days before the bout, Barão pulled out of the fight claiming that he did not officially sign a contract, and therefore did not agree to fight.

Barão was originally scheduled to face Peter Ligier at Fera Championship on 7 October 2023. However due to a switch in opponents, Barão faced Walter Zamora. He lost the bout via split decision.

On 11 December 2024, it was announced that Barão had signed with Global Fight League.

Barão was scheduled to debut with the Global Fight League in his third bout against Urijah Faber in the main event on 24 May 2025 at GFL 1. However, all GFL events were cancelled indefinitely.

== Grappling career ==
Barão won a gold medal in the master 2 lightweight division of the IBJJF Fortaleza International Open on 24 June 2023.

In July 2023, Barão announced that he had a grappling match with Charles Oliveira arranged for a future BJJ Stars event.

On May 27, 2025, Barão made his submission grappling debut against Arman Ospanov at Alash Pride 108: Ismagulov vs Patrick. The match resulted in a draw.

== Championships and accomplishments ==
- Ultimate Fighting Championship
  - UFC Bantamweight Championship (One time; former)
    - One successful title defense
  - Interim UFC Bantamweight Championship (One time; former)
    - Two successful title defenses
    - Tied (Dominick Cruz, Merab Dvalishvili & Aljamain Sterling) for second most title fight wins in UFC Bantamweight division history (3)
  - Fight of the Night (Three times) vs. Brad Pickett, T.J. Dillashaw, Jeremy Stephens
  - Performance of the Night (One time) vs. Mitch Gagnon
  - Knockout of the Night (One time) vs. Eddie Wineland
  - Submission of the Night (One time) vs. Michael McDonald
  - Tied (Aljamain Sterling) for most consecutive title defenses in UFC Bantamweight history (3)
  - Most title defenses as an Interim Champion in UFC history (2)
  - Most interim championship title wins in UFC history (3)
  - Only interim champion to rank above a current champion in pound for pound rankings
  - Tied (Aljamain Sterling) for the second longest win streak in UFC/WEC Bantamweight history (9)
  - Tied (Raphael Assunção & Petr Yan) for the fourth longest win streak in UFC Bantamweight history (7)
  - UFC.com Awards
    - 2013: Ranked #4 Knockout of the Year vs. Eddie Wineland
    - 2014: Ranked #8 Fight of the Year vs. T.J. Dillashaw 1
- Bleacher Report
  - 2013 #8 Ranked Fighter of the Year

== Mixed martial arts record ==
Professional record breakdown
45 matches	34 wins	10 losses
By knockout	8	3
By submission	15	0
By decision	11	7
No contests	1	

Res.	Record	Opponent	Method	Event	Date	Round	Time	Location	Notes
Loss	34–10 (1)	Walter Zamora	Decision (split)	Fera Championship: Fight Night	7 October 2023	3	5:00	Zahra, Kuwait	
Loss	34–9 (1)	Douglas Silva de Andrade	Decision (unanimous)	UFC Fight Night: Błachowicz vs. Jacaré	16 November 2019	3	5:00	São Paulo, Brazil	Return to Featherweight.
Loss	34–8 (1)	Luke Sanders	KO (punches)	UFC on ESPN: Ngannou vs. Velasquez	17 February 2019	2	1:01	Phoenix, Arizona, United States	Catchweight (138 lbs) bout; Barão missed weight.
Loss	34–7 (1)	Andre Ewell	Decision (split)	UFC Fight Night: Santos vs. Anders	22 September 2018	3	5:00	São Paulo, Brazil	Catchweight (141.75 lbs) bout; Barão missed weight.
Loss	34–6 (1)	Brian Kelleher	Decision (unanimous)	UFC on Fox: Emmett vs. Stephens	24 February 2018	3	5:00	Orlando, Florida, United States	Return to Bantamweight.
Loss	34–5 (1)	Aljamain Sterling	Decision (unanimous)	UFC 214	29 July 2017	3	5:00	Anaheim, California, United States	Catchweight (140 lbs) bout.
Win	34–4 (1)	Phillipe Nover	Decision (unanimous)	UFC Fight Night: Cyborg vs. Länsberg	24 September 2016	3	5:00	Brasília, Brazil	
Loss	33–4 (1)	Jeremy Stephens	Decision (unanimous)	UFC Fight Night: Almeida vs. Garbrandt	29 May 2016	3	5:00	Las Vegas, Nevada, United States	Return to Featherweight. Fight of the Night.
Loss	33–3 (1)	T.J. Dillashaw	TKO (punches)	UFC on Fox: Dillashaw vs. Barão 2	25 July 2015	4	0:35	Chicago, Illinois, United States	For the UFC Bantamweight Championship.
Win	33–2 (1)	Mitch Gagnon	Submission (arm-triangle choke)	UFC Fight Night: Machida vs. Dollaway	20 December 2014	3	3:53	Barueri, Brazil	Performance of the Night.
Loss	32–2 (1)	T.J. Dillashaw	TKO (head kick and punches)	UFC 173	24 May 2014	5	2:26	Las Vegas, Nevada, United States	Lost the UFC Bantamweight Championship. Fight of the Night.
Win	32–1 (1)	Urijah Faber	TKO (punches)	UFC 169	1 February 2014	1	3:42	Newark, New Jersey, United States	Defended the UFC Bantamweight Championship.
Win	31–1 (1)	Eddie Wineland	TKO (spinning back kick and punches)	UFC 165	21 September 2013	2	0:35	Toronto, Ontario, Canada	Defended the interim UFC Bantamweight Championship. Knockout of the Night. Barão was promoted to undisputed champion on January 6, 2014.
Win	30–1 (1)	Michael McDonald	Submission (arm-triangle choke)	UFC on Fuel TV: Barão vs. McDonald	16 February 2013	4	3:57	London, England	Defended the interim UFC Bantamweight Championship. Submission of the Night.
Win	29–1 (1)	Urijah Faber	Decision (unanimous)	UFC 149	21 July 2012	5	5:00	Calgary, Alberta, Canada	Won the interim UFC Bantamweight Championship.
Win	28–1 (1)	Scott Jorgensen	Decision (unanimous)	UFC 143	4 February 2012	3	5:00	Las Vegas, Nevada, United States	
Win	27–1 (1)	Brad Pickett	Submission (rear-naked choke)	UFC 138	5 November 2011	1	4:09	Birmingham, England	Fight of the Night.
Win	26–1 (1)	Cole Escovedo	Decision (unanimous)	UFC 130	28 May 2011	3	5:00	Las Vegas, Nevada, United States	
Win	25–1 (1)	Chris Cariaso	Submission (rear-naked choke)	WEC 53	16 December 2010	1	3:47	Glendale, Arizona, United States	
Win	24–1 (1)	Anthony Leone	Submission (armbar)	WEC 49	20 June 2010	3	2:29	Edmonton, Alberta, Canada	Catchweight (143 lbs) bout.
Win	23–1 (1)	Sérgio Silva	Decision (unanimous)	Jungle Fight 17: Vila Velha	27 February 2010	3	5:00	Vila Velha, Brazil	
Win	22–1 (1)	Jorge Enciso	Submission (rear-naked choke)	Platinum Fight Brazil 2	5 December 2009	1	3:42	Rio de Janeiro, Brazil	
Win	21–1 (1)	Marcio Nunes	Submission (kimura)	Eagle Fighting Championship	26 September 2009	1	2:45	São Paulo, Brazil	
Win	20–1 (1)	Paulo Dantas	Decision (unanimous)	Shooto 13	27 August 2009	3	5:00	Fortaleza, Brazil	
Win	19–1 (1)	Jurandir Sardinha	TKO (punches)	Platinum Fight Brazil	13 August 2009	2	0:21	Natal, Brazil	
Win	18–1 (1)	Andre Luiz	Submission (triangle choke)	Watch Out Combat Show 3	19 March 2009	3	1:38	Rio de Janeiro, Brazil	
Win	17–1 (1)	Alexandre Dinheiro	TKO (arm injury)	Shooto Brazil 9	29 November 2008	3	0:58	Fortaleza, Brazil	
Win	16–1 (1)	Rogerio Silva	Submission (rear-naked choke)	Watch Out Combat Show 2	25 September 2008	2	3:21	Rio de Janeiro, Brazil	
Win	15–1 (1)	William Porfirio	KO (knee)	Watch Out Combat Show 2	25 September 2008	1	2:25	Rio de Janeiro, Brazil	
Win	14–1 (1)	Fabiano Lucas	Decision (unanimous)	Shooto Brazil 8	30 August 2008	3	5:00	Rio de Janeiro, Brazil	
Win	13–1 (1)	Jetron Azevedo	Submission (armbar)	Leal Combat	5 June 2008	1	4:56	Natal, Brazil	Lightweight debut. Azevedo missed weight (152lbs).
Win	12–1 (1)	Ronaldo Figueiredo	Decision (unanimous)	Natal Cage Vale Tudo	23 May 2008	3	5:00	Natal, Brazil	
Win	11–1 (1)	William Vianna	Decision (unanimous)	Shooto Brazil 6	19 April 2008	3	5:00	Rio de Janeiro, Brazil	
NC	10–1 (1)	Claudemir Souza	NC (illegal soccer kick)	Black Bull Vale Tudo	12 December 2007	1	5:00	Recife, Brazil	Barão was rendered unable to continue.
Win	10–1	Danilo Noronha	Submission (rear-naked choke)	Shooto Brazil 4	October 27, 2007	1	0:33	Rio de Janeiro, Brazil	
Win	9–1	Erinaldo Rodriguez	Submission (ankle lock)	Shooto Brazil 3	7 July 2007	1	1:33	Rio de Janeiro, Brazil	Bantamweight debut.
Win	8–1	Carlos Heide	Submission (triangle choke)	Garra Fight	25 April 2007	1	N/A	Natal, Brazil	
Win	7–1	Janailson Pereira	Decision (split)	Garra Fight	25 April 2007	3	5:00	Natal, Brazil	
Win	6–1	Rony Jason	Decision (split)	Cage Fight Nordeste	November 9, 2006	3	5:00	Natal, Brazil	
Win	5–1	Caio Robson	TKO (punches)	Nordest Combat Championship	6 September 2006	1	2:45	Natal, Brazil	
Win	4–1	Gleison Menezes	Submission (kneebar)	Rino's FC 2	8 June 2006	1	N/A	Recife, Brazil	
Win	3–1	Dande Dande	KO	Fight Ship Looking Boy 2	22 November 2005	1	N/A	Natal, Brazil	
Win	2–1	Anistavio Medeiros	Submission (rear-naked choke)	Mossoro Fight	26 August 2005	2	3:41	Mossoró, Brazil	Return to Featherweight
Win	1–1	Melk Freitas	TKO (punches)	Tremores Fight	20 May 2005	3	1:41	João Câmara, Brazil	
Loss	0–1	João Paulo Rodrigues de Souza	Decision (unanimous)	Heat FC 3	14 April 2005	3	5:00	Natal, Brazil	Professional debut.

== Mixed martial arts exhibition record ==
Professional record breakdown
1 match	0 wins	1 loss
By submission	0	1

Res.	Record	Opponent	Method	Event	Date	Round	Time	Location	Notes
Loss	0–1	Simão Peixoto	Submission (Arm Triangle choke)	Solidário Fight Combat: Peixoto vs Barão	17 December 2022	3	N/A	Borba, Brazil	Openweight bout.

== Pay-per-view bouts ==
No.	Event	Fight	Date	Venue	City	PPV Buys
1.	UFC 149	Faber vs. Barão	July 21, 2012	Scotiabank Saddledome	Calgary, Alberta, Canada	235,000
2.	UFC 169	Barão vs. Faber 2	February 1, 2014	Prudential Center	Newark, New Jersey, United States	230,000
3.	UFC 173	Barão vs. Dillashaw	May 24, 2014	MGM Grand Garden Arena	Las Vegas, Nevada, United States	215,000

== See also ==
- List of current GFL fighters
- List of male mixed martial artists

Awards and achievements
New title	1st UFC Interim Bantamweight Champion; 21 July 2012 – 6 January 2014; Promoted	Vacant Title next held by Petr Yan
Preceded by Dominick Cruz	2nd UFC Bantamweight Champion; 6 January 2014 – 24 May 2014	Succeeded by T.J. Dillashaw
