= Claudio Ledesma =

American mixed martial artist

- Born: April 2, 1983 (age 43); West Orange, New Jersey, United States
- Nationality: American
- Height: 5 ft 6 in (1.68 m)
- Weight: 125 lb (57 kg; 8.9 st)
- Division: Flyweight; Bantamweight
- Reach: 66.0 in (168 cm)
- Fighting out of: Denville, New Jersey, United States
- Team: Renzo Gracie Denville
- Years active: 2009–present

Mixed martial arts record
- Total: 25
- Wins: 15
- By knockout: 2
- By submission: 3
- By decision: 10
- Losses: 10
- By knockout: 1
- By decision: 9

Other information
- Mixed martial arts record from Sherdog

Claudio Ledesma (born April 2, 1983) is an American mixed martial artist currently competing as a Flyweight. A professional competitor since 2009, Ledesma has previously competed for Bellator.

== Mixed martial arts career ==
=== Early career ===
Making his professional debut in 2009, Ledesma compiled a record of 4 wins and 2 losses before signing with Bellator.

=== Bellator Fighting Championships ===
Ledesma made his Bellator debut on October 15, 2011, against Brian Kelleher at Bellator 54. Ledesma won the fight via unanimous decision.

In his next bout for Bellator, Ledesma faced future Bellator bantamweight title challenger Anthony Leone at Bellator 68 on May 11, 2012. Ledesma lost the fight via split decision.

Ledesma faced Kenny Foster on September 28, 2012, at Bellator 74. He won the fight via unanimous decision.

Ledesma was expected to face Nick Kirk at Bellator 83 on December 7, 2012. However, the fight was cancelled prior to the event. Ledesma instead faced David Harris and won via unanimous decision.

=== Cage Fury Fighting Championships ===
After his Bellator stint, Ledesma faced former Bellator bantamweight champion Zach Makovsky at CFFC 24: Sullivan vs. Becker. Ledemsa was defeated via unanimous decision.

Ledesma then faced Marcio Bittencourt at CFFC 34: Santella vs. Honstein on April 19, 2014. Ledesma won the fight via TKO in the third round.

Ledesma faced Darren Mima at CFFC 36: Secor vs. Good on June 21, 2014. He lost via unanimous decision.

Ledesma faced Dave Morgan on December 13, 2014, at CFFC 44: Bezerra vs. Makashvili 2. He won the fight via rear-naked choke submission in the first round.

Ledesma faced Evan Velez at CFFC 48: Good vs. Burrell on May 9, 2015. He won the fight via unanimous decision.

Ledesma faced UFC veteran Louis Gaudinot in the main event of CFFC 51 on September 12, 2015. He lost the fight by unanimous decision.

== Mixed martial arts record ==
Professional record breakdown
25 matches	15 wins	10 losses
By knockout	2	1
By submission	3	0
By decision	10	9
Draws	0	

Res.	Record	Opponent	Method	Event	Date	Round	Time	Location	Notes
Loss	16–10	Wascar Cruz	TKO (punches)	Combate Global: Acosta vs. Coates	August 6, 2021	2	4:24	Miami, Florida, United States	
Loss	16–9	Tony Laramie	Decision (unanimous)	PFC 13: Unfinished Business 2	March 8, 2020	5	5:00	Toronto, Canada	For the vacant PFC Flyweight Championship.
Loss	16–8	Juan Puerta	Decision (unanimous)	Titan FC 55: Puerta vs. Ledesma	June 28, 2019	3	5:00	Fort Lauderdale, Florida, United States	For the Titan FC Flyweight Championship.
Win	16–7	Jesse Bazzi	Decision (unanimous)	PA Cage Fight 35	March 23, 2019	3	5:00	Wilkes-Barre, Pennsylvania, United States	
Win	15–7	Andre Bernardo	Decision (unanimous)	MMA Pro League 1: New Jersey vs. Pennsylvania	September 15, 2018	3	5:00	Atlantic City, New Jersey, United States	
Win	14–7	Desmond Moore	Decision (unanimous)	CFFC 68	October 21, 2017	3	5:00	Atlantic City, New Jersey, United States	
Win	13–7	Alberto Orellano	Decision (unanimous)	CFFC 63: Anyanwu vs. Teed	February 18, 2017	3	5:00	Atlantic City, New Jersey, United States	
Win	12–7	Tuan Pham	Decision (split)	CFFC 61: Anyanwu vs. Pinto	October 29, 2016	3	5:00	Atlantic City, New Jersey, United States	
Loss	11–7	Jordan Morales	Decision (split)	CFFC 55: Chookagian vs. Varela	January 9, 2016	3	5:00	Bethlehem, Pennsylvania, United States	Bantamweight bout.
Loss	11–6	Louis Gaudinot	Decision (unanimous)	CFFC 51: Ledesma vs. Gaudinot	September 12, 2015	3	5:00	Bethlehem, Pennsylvania, United States	
Win	11–5	Evan Velez	Decision (unanimous)	CFFC 48: Good vs. Burrell	May 9, 2015	3	5:00	Atlantic City, New Jersey, United States	
Win	10–5	Dave Morgan	Submission (rear-naked choke)	CFFC 44: Bezerra vs. Makashvili 2	December 13, 2014	1	2:49	Bethlehem, Pennsylvania, United States	
Loss	9–5	Darren Mima	Decision (unanimous)	CFFC 36: Secor vs. Good	June 21, 2014	3	5:00	Morristown, New Jersey, United States	
Win	9–4	Marcio Bittencourt	TKO (punches)	CFFC 34: Santella vs. Honstein	April 19, 2014	3	1:10	Morristown, New Jersey, United States	
Loss	8–4	Zach Makovsky	Decision (unanimous)	CFFC 24: Sullivan vs. Becker	May 11, 2013	3	5:00	Atlantic City, New Jersey, United States	Flyweight debut.
Win	8–3	David Harris	Decision (unanimous)	Bellator 83	December 7, 2012	3	5:00	Atlantic City, New Jersey, United States	
Win	7–3	Kenny Foster	Decision (unanimous)	Bellator 74	September 28, 2012	3	5:00	Atlantic City, New Jersey, United States	
Loss	6–3	Anthony Leone	Decision (split)	Bellator 68	May 11, 2012	3	5:00	Atlantic City, New Jersey, United States	
Win	6–2	Pedro Gonzalez	Decision (unanimous)	CFFC 13: Gambino vs. Foster	February 4, 2012	3	5:00	Atlantic City, New Jersey, United States	
Win	5–2	Brian Kelleher	Decision (unanimous)	Bellator 54	October 15, 2011	3	5:00	Atlantic City, New Jersey, United States	Catchweight (140 lbs) bout.
Loss	4–2	Aljamain Sterling	Decision (split)	Ring of Combat 36	June 17, 2011	3	5:00	Atlantic City, New Jersey, United States	For the ROC bantamweight championship.
Win	4–1	Michael LaDuke	Submission (rear-naked choke)	Ring of Combat 35	April 8, 2011	2	0:43	Atlantic City, New Jersey, United States	
Win	3–1	Michael Murray	Decision (unanimous)	Ring of Combat 32	October 23, 2010	3	4:00	Atlantic City, New Jersey, United States	
Win	2–1	Adam Shortz	TKO (punches)	UCC 3: Renegades	September 10, 2010	1	4:08	Jersey City, New Jersey, United States	
Loss	1–1	Jimmie Rivera	Decision (unanimous)	UCC 1: Merciless	March 19, 2010	3	5:00	Jersey City, New Jersey, United States	
Win	1–0	Larry Byrnes	Submission (rear-naked choke)	Asylum Fight League 21	November 7, 2009	2	1:51	Philadelphia, Pennsylvania, United States	
