= Frank Caraballo =

American mixed martial artist

- Born: December 18, 1984 (age 41); Cleveland, Ohio, United States
- Other names: The Tank
- Height: 5 ft 8 in (173 cm)
- Weight: 145 lb (66 kg; 10 st 5 lb)
- Division: Featherweight
- Fighting out of: Cleveland, Ohio, United States
- Team: Fearless Fight Team
- Years active: 2008–present

Mixed martial arts record
- Total: 23
- Wins: 14
- By knockout: 6
- By submission: 5
- By decision: 3
- Losses: 9
- By knockout: 2
- By submission: 4
- By decision: 3

Other information
- Mixed martial arts record from Sherdog

Frank Caraballo (born December 18, 1984) is an American mixed martial artist who competes in the featherweight division.

== Mixed martial arts career ==
=== Bellator Fighting Championships ===
Caraballo lost to UFC veteran Waylon Lowe via unanimous decision at Bellator V.

At Bellator LI, Frank defeated Dustin Kempf via first-round TKO due to injury.

At Bellator LXVI, Frank defeated Donny Walker via flying knee KO in the fourth round and in doing so unified his NAAFS interim featherweight title with the real title to become the undisputed NAAFS featherweight champion.

== Mixed martial arts record ==
Professional record breakdown
23 matches	14 wins	9 losses
By knockout	6	2
By submission	5	4
By decision	3	3

Res.	Record	Opponent	Method	Event	Date	Round	Time	Location	Notes
Loss	14–9	Alexandre Bezerra	TKO (punches)	XCC 24 - Xtreme Caged Combat 24	April 30, 2016	1	3:57	Bethlehem, Pennsylvania, United States	
Loss	14–8	Agimambet Aider-Ayan	Submission (rear-naked choke)	RFO - Big Guns 16: The Summit	August 22, 2015	1	4:02	Tallmadge, Ohio, United States	
Win	14–7	Cody Stevens	Decision (unanimous)	NAAFS: Rock N' Rumble 8	October 4, 2014	3	5:00	Canton, Ohio, United States	
Win	13–7	Tommy Hayden	TKO (retirement)	NAAFS: Fight Night in the Flats 10	June 7, 2014	2	2:29	Cleveland, Ohio, United States	
Loss	12–7	Bavela George-Claudiu	Decision (unanimous)	NAAFS: Driven MMA 1	March 1, 2014	3	5:00	Canton, Ohio, United States	
Loss	12–6	Chris Horodecki	Decision (unanimous)	PFC 1: Unrivaled	October 25, 2013	3	5:00	London, Ontario, Canada	
Win	12–5	Tony Hervey	Submission (guillotine choke)	NAAFS: Caged Vengeance 13	March 30, 2013	1	2:42	Canton, Ohio, United States	
Loss	11–5	Deividas Taurosevičius	Submission (reverse triangle choke)	Ring of Combat 43	January 25, 2013	1	3:38	Atlantic City, New Jersey, United States	For the Ring of Combat Featherweight Championship.
Win	11–4	Bratianu Raul	KO (spinning backfist and punches)	NAAFS: Caged Vengeance 11	August 4, 2012	2	0:38	Cleveland, Ohio, United States	
Win	10–4	Antonio Castillo Jr.	Submission (rear-naked choke)	NAAFS: Fight Night in the Flats 8	June 2, 2012	1	3:46	Cleveland, Ohio, United States	
Win	9–4	Donny Walker	KO (flying knee)	Bellator 66	April 20, 2012	4	2:25	Cleveland, Ohio, United States	
Win	8–4	Dustin Kempf	TKO (knee injury)	Bellator 51	September 24, 2011	1	1:19	Canton, Ohio, United States	
Win	7–4	Doug Kulbis	KO (punches)	NAAFS: Rock N Rumble 5	August 27, 2011	1	0:11	Cleveland, Ohio, United States	Featherweight Debut.
Win	6–4	Brady Hovermale	Decision (unanimous)	NAAFS: Fight Night in the Flats 7	June 4, 2011	3	5:00	Cleveland, Ohio, United States	Won the NAAFS Lightweight Championship.
Loss	5–4	Negrila Cosmin-Ionut	Technical Submission (arm-triangle choke)	FCF: Freestyle Cage Fighting 44	September 25, 2010	2	1:32	Shawnee, Oklahoma, United States	
Win	5–3	Terry Blackwell	Decision (unanimous)	NAAFS: Rock N Rumble 4	August 28, 2010	3	5:00	Cleveland, Ohio, United States	
Loss	4–3	Daniel Mason-Straus	Submission (punches)	NAAFS: Caged Fury 9	February 20, 2010	5	3:57	Cleveland, Ohio, United States	Lost the NAAFS Interim Pro Series Lightweight Championship.
Win	4–2	Nick Sorg	Submission (armbar)	NAAFS: Rock N Rumble 3	August 28, 2009	2	1:59	Cleveland, Ohio, United States	Won NAAFS Interim Pro Series Lightweight Championship.
Loss	3–2	Drew Dober	TKO (punches)	VFC 28: Throwdown	July 24, 2009	2	3:58	Iowa, United States	
Loss	3–1	Waylon Lowe	Decision (unanimous)	Bellator 5	May 1, 2009	3	5:00	Dayton, Ohio, United States	Bellator Debut.
Win	3–0	Phillip Tomblin	Submission (guillotine choke)	NAAFS: Caged Fury 6	February 21, 2009	1	4:16	Cleveland, Ohio, United States	
Win	2–0	Ben Pettit	TKO (punches)	NAAFS: Night of Champions 2008	December 8, 2008	1	0:13	Cleveland, Ohio, United States	
Win	1–0	Paul Compton	Submission (guillotine choke)	NAAFS: Rock N Rumble 2	August 23, 2008	1	4:59	Cleveland, Ohio, United States	Pro debut.

== See also ==
- List of Bellator MMA alumni
- List of male mixed martial artists
