= 10th Planet Jiu Jitsu =

Brazilian Jiu-Jitsu system developed by Eddie Bravo

10th Planet Jiu-Jitsu
- 10th Planet Jiu-Jitsu logo
- Date founded: 2003
- Country of origin: United States
- Founder: Eddie Bravo
- Current head: Eddie Bravo
- Ancestor arts: Brazilian jiu-jitsu Folkstyle wrestling
- Official website: www.10thplanetjj.com

10th Planet Jiu-Jitsu is a non-traditional system of Brazilian jiu-jitsu developed by Eddie Bravo. It is a no-gi based style so the fighters use rash guards as their main fighting wear. 10th Planet Jiu-Jitsu fighters are known to employ unorthodox guard positions and a distinct focus on leg lock attacks.

== History ==
In 2003, after earning a black belt under Jean-Jacques Machado, Eddie Bravo opened his first 10th Planet Jiu-Jitsu school in Los Angeles, California. Bravo's system emphasizes developing students for submission-only grappling competition rather than points, he focused his jiu-jitsu training without the traditional gi, becoming one of the first jiu-jitsu schools in the US to do so. The idea behind this was to try to implement as many of the techniques as possible in mixed martial arts (MMA) competitions. Bravo worked for the Ultimate Fighting Championship (UFC) during this time and felt high-level jiu-jitsu practitioners weren't winning as much as they should have, mainly attributing this to them wearing a gi when training jiu-jitsu, but competing in MMA without one.

10th Planet Jiu-Jitsu has been controversial since its inception; abandoning the gi drew some backlash from other jiu-jitsu schools and there has been a debate as to how many 10th Planet techniques, most notably its iterations of the rubber guard, translate to MMA.

In addition to the original 10th Planet headquarters in Los Angeles, there are over 100 schools worldwide. Some are established jiu-jitsu training facilities that have adopted the system as an expansion of the art. In Southern California, affiliate schools include 10th Planet Jiu Jitsu Orange in Orange and 10th Planet Jiu Jitsu Fullerton in Fullerton, both operating from the website 10th Planet Orange & Fullerton. The style has spread overseas to Ireland, the United Kingdom, Germany, Sweden, Australia, Mexico, Brazil, and Korea.

== Notable students ==
- Joe Rogan
- Ben Saunders
- Tony Ferguson
- Michael Chandler Jr.
- Carlos Condit
- Vinny Magalhães
- Raul Rosas Jr.
- Ilima-Lei Macfarlane
- PJ Barch
- Richie "Boogeyman" Martinez
- Geo Martinez
- Bed Eddy

== Ranking system ==
While 10th Planet Jiu-Jitsu uses the standard Brazilian jiu-jitsu ranking system, its practitioners most commonly train without gi and the belt. 10th Planet used colored rashguards to help visually denote belt rank.

== Notable techniques and systems ==
10th Planet Jiu-Jitsu is commonly associated with several grappling positions and systems developed or popularized by Eddie Bravo, many of which use terminology specific to the style.

Rubber Guard is a variation of closed guard that sues a high leg position to control an opponent's posture and create opportunities for submissions. It was originally developed to minimize striking opportunities in MMA. Associated positions and techniques include Mission Control, New York, Chill Dog, the gogoplata, and Dead Orchard.

Lockdown is a type of half guard in which the bottom player entangles the opponent's trapped leg to establish control, minimize space, and facilitate sweeps and submissions. Associated techniques include the Whip up, Old School sweep, and Electric Chair.

The Truck is a position involving control of an opponent's leg and hips, used to transition to back control or apply submissions, such as the Twister (wrestler's guillotine), Banana Split, and calf slicer.

Twister Side Control (also known as Reverse Kesa Gatame) is a variation of side control in which the top player faces the opponent's legs. It is commonly used to facilitate transitions to the Truck, mount, and back control.

Spiderweb is an armbar control position where the top player controls the bottom player's arm and near-side leg. It is primarily used to set up armbars, but also offers opportunities for bicep slicers and triangles.
