= Waylon Lowe =

American mixed martial arts fighter (born 1980)

- Born: Michael Waylon Lowe; October 31, 1980 (age 45); Jefferson City, Tennessee, United States
- Height: 5 ft 7 in (1.70 m)
- Weight: 155 lb (70 kg; 11.1 st)
- Division: Featherweight (currently); Lightweight
- Reach: 68 1/2 in (174 cm)
- Stance: Southpaw
- Fighting out of: Coconut Creek, Florida, United States
- Team: American Top Team
- Rank: NCAA Division II Wrestler
- Years active: 2006–present

Mixed martial arts record
- Total: 25
- Wins: 16
- By knockout: 7
- By submission: 3
- By decision: 6
- Losses: 7
- By knockout: 2
- By submission: 5
- No contests: 2

Other information
- Mixed martial arts record from Sherdog

Michael Waylon Lowe (born October 31, 1980) is an American mixed martial artist who most recently competed in the Lightweight division. A professional competitor since 2006, he has competed for the UFC, Bellator MMA, and the World Series of Fighting.

== Amateur wrestling career ==
Lowe was a two-time state finalist and one-time state champion for Jefferson County High School in Dandridge, Tennessee before wrestling for the University of Findlay in Findlay, Ohio. Lowe recorded 112 victories during his collegiate career. He was the school's first NCAA national champion in any sport when he captured the 149 lbs national title in 2002. He won two other NCAA Division II crowns, one at 149 lbs in 2003 and another at 165 lbs in 2004. In 2004, he faced off with Shawn Silvis in the finals who also was a two-time national champion. Lowe won the match 8-6 and also won the Outstanding Wrestling award for the tournament. Lowe ranks 4th in career wins, 1st in season wins, 2nd in career takedowns, and 6th in season takedowns for the University of Findlay. In 2013, he joined the advisory board for Wrestler Supply, an online e-commerce site for high-end wrestling gear.

== Mixed martial arts career ==
Lowe's interest in MMA sparked while he was training at the Olympic Training Center in Colorado Springs, Colorado. He was only there to train in wrestling, but he had the opportunity to briefly speak with Matt Lindland. Lindland was so influential that Lowe flew out to Oregon to train with Lindland and Randy Couture.

Lowe held only a 1-0 amateur record before his team, Team Gurgel and Team Vision, requested he go pro. Lowe's professional debut was against David Love at a local Hook 'N' Shoot event. Lowe lost the fight after he tapped out from a guillotine choke. He bounced back from the loss with two submission wins, improving his record to 2-1.

In 2007, he lost to the more experienced Alonzo Martinez via submission from punches in the first round. Lowe racked up three wins before trying out for the ninth season of the Ultimate Fighter reality show. Lowe was selected as one of the contestants and brought in for the show. Before he could move in the TUF house, Lowe had to fight Santino DeFranco. After an impressive first round, which Dana White believed should not have gone to a second round because of the beating Lowe delivered to DeFranco, Lowe was defeated by submission early in the second round.

Lowe took about five months off after losing on the Ultimate Fighter show, but then returned to fight for Bellator Fighting Championships. At Bellator 5, Lowe defeated Frank Caraballo via unanimous decision. In April 2010, Lowe defeated UFC veteran Steve Berger via KO midway through round one.

=== Ultimate Fighting Championship ===
Lowe made his UFC debut stepping in for Thiago Tavares against Melvin Guillard on May 29, 2010, at UFC 114. Guillard won the fight via KO due to a knee to the body as Lowe was attempting a takedown in the first round.

Lowe fought Steve Lopez on September 25, 2010, at UFC 119. Lowe defeated Lopez via split decision earning his first UFC victory.

On January 22, 2011, at UFC Fight Night 23, Lowe fought former Shooto welterweight champion, Willamy Freire. Lowe won the fight via unanimous decision after dominating his opponent with superior wrestling and effective ground and pound.

Lowe lost to Nik Lentz on March 26, 2011, at UFC Fight Night 24. After Lowe won the first and second rounds convincingly, Lentz came back in the third and scored an impressive come-from-behind submission win.

Following his loss to Lentz, Lowe was subsequently released from the promotion.

=== Pro Elite ===
Lowe signed with ProElite in October 2011. He made his Pro Elite debut against Floyd Hodges at ProElite: Big Guns. Lowe won via TKO (doctor stoppage) at 5:00 of the second round.

=== World Series of Fighting ===
Lowe made his WSOF debut at World Series of Fighting 2 where he defeated Cameron Dollar by knockout.

For his second fight with the promotion, Lowe appeared on the main card in a fight against Georgi Karakhanyan at World Series of Fighting 5 on September 14, 2013. He lost the fight via submission in the first round.

=== XFC Brazil ===
Lowe made his XFC Brazil debut, when he faced Marcos dos Santos at XFC International 4 on April 26, 2014. After three close rounds, Lowe would lose via split decision. However, following the fight, the result would later be turned to a no contest.

In his next fight in the organization, Lowe faced Deivison Ribeiro for the XFC Featherweight Championship at XFC International 6 on September 27, 2014. He lost the fight via TKO in the fourth round.

=== Return to Bellator ===
Lowe faced Ryan Quinn at Bellator 140 on July 17, 2015. He lost the fight by submission in the second round.

== Mixed martial arts record ==
Professional record breakdown
25 matches	16 wins	7 losses
By knockout	8	3
By submission	2	4
By decision	6	0
No contests	2	

Res.	Record	Opponent	Method	Event	Date	Round	Time	Location	Notes
NC	16–7 (2)	Ashleigh Grimshaw	No Contest	Art of War 17	April 30, 2016	1	1:23	Beijing, China	
Win	16–7 (1)	Vaso Bakočević	Decision (unanimous)	Abu Dhabi Warriors 3	October 3, 2015	3	5:00	Abu Dhabi, United Arab Emirates	Originally a Lightweight bout; Lowe missed weight.
Loss	15–7 (1)	Ryan Quinn	Submission (guillotine choke)	Bellator 140	July 17, 2015	2	2:47	Uncasville, Connecticut, United States	Catchweight (160 lbs) bout.
Win	15–6 (1)	Mateusz Teodorczuk	Decision (unanimous)	Abu Dhabi Warriors 2	March 26, 2015	3	5:00	Abu Dhabi, United Arab Emirates	Return to Lightweight.
Loss	14–6 (1)	Deivison Ribeiro	TKO (head kick and punches)	XFC International 6	September 27, 2014	4	0:11	Araraquara, Brazil	For the XFC Featherweight Championship.
NC	14–5 (1)	Marcos dos Santos	No Contest	XFC International 4	April 26, 2014	3	5:00	São Paulo, Brazil	
Loss	14–5	Georgi Karakhanyan	Submission (guillotine choke)	World Series of Fighting 5	September 14, 2013	1	3:37	Atlantic City, New Jersey, United States	
Win	14–4	Cameron Dollar	KO (punch)	World Series of Fighting 2	March 23, 2013	1	2:58	Atlantic City, New Jersey, United States	Featherweight debut.
Win	13–4	Mike Diggs	TKO (punches)	Pure MMA 2: Next Episode	May 12, 2012	2	3:13	Wilkes-Barre, Pennsylvania, United States	
Win	12–4	Tim Wadsworth	KO (punch)	Instinct MMA: Instinct Fighting 2	December 2, 2011	1	2:51	Quebec City, Quebec, Canada	
Win	11–4	Floyd Hodges	TKO (doctor stoppage)	ProElite: Big Guns	November 5, 2011	2	5:00	Moline, Illinois, United States	
Loss	10–4	Nik Lentz	Submission (guillotine choke)	UFC Fight Night: Nogueira vs. Davis	March 26, 2011	3	2:24	Seattle, Washington, United States	
Win	10–3	Willamy Freire	Decision (unanimous)	UFC: Fight For The Troops 2	January 22, 2011	3	5:00	Fort Hood, Texas, United States	
Win	9–3	Steve Lopez	Decision (split)	UFC 119	September 25, 2010	3	5:00	Indianapolis, Indiana, United States	
Loss	8–3	Melvin Guillard	TKO (knee to the body)	UFC 114	May 29, 2010	1	3:28	Las Vegas, Nevada, United States	
Win	8–2	Steve Berger	KO (punches)	KOTC: Bad Boys II	April 16, 2010	1	2:18	Detroit, Michigan, United States	
Win	7–2	Chris Barnes	TKO (punches)	5150 Combat League/XFL: New Year's Revolution	January 16, 2010	1	1:12	Tulsa, Oklahoma, United States	
Win	6–2	Frank Caraballo	Decision (unanimous)	Bellator 5	May 1, 2009	3	5:00	Dayton, Ohio, United States	
Win	5–2	Jay Ellis	Decision (unanimous)	Extreme Challenge 109	October 18, 2008	3	5:00	Moline, Illinois, United States	
Win	4–2	Alex Carter	Submission (rear-naked choke)	International Combat Event 32	March 8, 2008	1	3:06	Cincinnati, Ohio, United States	
Win	3–2	Andrew Hoogeboom	TKO (punches)	Xtreme Fighting Organization 22	February 23, 2008	1	0:43	Crystal Lake, Illinois, United States	
Loss	2–2	Alonzo Martinez	TKO (submission to punches)	Fightfest: Season 1 Finale	May 12, 2007	1	3:07	Canton, Ohio, United States	
Win	2–1	Nick Sorg	TKO (submission to punches)	Fightfest 10	February 3, 2007	2	1:59	Canton, Ohio, United States	
Win	1–1	Cody Shipp	Submission (kimura)	Fightfest 7: Battle of the Titans	September 23, 2006	2	2:23	Cleveland, Ohio, United States	
Loss	0–1	David Love	Submission (guillotine choke)	HOOKnSHOOT: Midwest	May 20, 2006	1	1:00	Evansville, Indiana, United States	

== See also ==
- List of male mixed martial artists
- List of Bellator MMA alumni
