= Lester Caslow =

American mixed martial artist

- Born: July 10, 1984 (age 42); Hillside, New Jersey, United States
- Nationality: American
- Height: 5 ft 9 in (1.75 m)
- Weight: 145 lb (66 kg; 10.4 st)
- Division: Lightweight; Featherweight
- Reach: 67.0 in (170 cm)
- Fighting out of: Toms River, New Jersey, United States
- Team: Pellegrino MMA
- Trainer: Kurt Pellegrino
- Years active: 2007–present

Mixed martial arts record
- Total: 27
- Wins: 15
- By knockout: 4
- By submission: 9
- By decision: 2
- Losses: 11
- By submission: 7
- By decision: 4
- No contests: 1

Other information
- Mixed martial arts record from Sherdog

Lester Caslow (born July 10, 1984) is an American mixed martial artist currently competing in the Featherweight division.

== Mixed martial arts career ==
=== Early career ===
Before making his professional debut, Caslow held an amateur record of 1-0. In a span of four years, Caslow compiled a record of 6–3 (1) in smaller organizations before debuting for Bellator.

=== Bellator ===
On October 21, 2010, Caslow made his debut for the promotion against Kenny Foster at Bellator 33. Caslow lost the bout via three-round unanimous decision.

Caslow eventually returned to the Bellator cage on September 10, 2011 at Bellator 49 against James Jones. He won the fight via TKO in the second round.

He then faced Scott Heckman on April 13, 2012 at Bellator 65. Caslow lost the bout via first-round rear-naked choke submission.

Caslow would then compile a record of 3–1 in other promotions before returning to Bellator against Jay Haas at Bellator 109 on November 22, 2013. Caslow won the fight via guillotine choke submission in the third round.

In a rematch, Caslow faced Jay Haas at Bellator 118 on May 2, 2014. Caslow defeated Haas for a second time via guillotine choke submission, this time in the first round.

== Mixed martial arts record ==
Professional record breakdown
25 matches	15 wins	10 losses
By knockout	4	0
By submission	9	6
By decision	2	4
Draws	0	

Res.	Record	Opponent	Method	Event	Date	Round	Time	Location	Notes
Loss	15–11 (1)	Mike Santiago	Submission (rear-naked choke)	Ring of Combat 54	March 4, 2016	1	3:40	Atlantic City, New Jersey, United States	For Ring of Combat Featherweight Championship.
Win	15–10 (1)	Kenny Foster	Submission (guillotine choke)	Ring of Combat 53	November 20, 2015	3	2:04	Atlantic City, New Jersey, United States	
Loss	14–10 (1)	Francisco Isata	Decision (unanimous)	Cage Fury FC 44: Smith vs. Williams	July 18, 2015	3	5:00	Atlantic City, New Jersey, United States	
Win	14–9 (1)	David Harris	Submission (choke)	Fight Club OC: For the Leathernecks IV	May 8, 2015	1	0:59	Jacksonville, North Carolina, United States	
Win	13–9 (1)	Justin Dalton	Submission (guillotine choke)	Cage Fury FC 44: Bezerra vs. Makashvili 2	December 13, 2014	1	2:11	Bethlehem, Pennsylvania, United States	Catchweight (140 lbs) bout.
Win	12–9 (1)	Jay Haas	Submission (guillotine choke)	Bellator 118	May 2, 2014	1	2:29	Atlantic City, New Jersey, United States	
Loss	11–9 (1)	Brian Kelleher	Submission (rear-naked choke)	Cage Fury FC 31: Heckman vs. Lentz	February 8, 2014	2	1:34	Atlantic City, New Jersey, United States	
Win	11–8 (1)	Jay Haas	Submission (guillotine choke)	Bellator 109	November 22, 2013	3	2:44	Bethlehem, Pennsylvania, United States	Return to Featherweight.
Win	10–8 (1)	Brylan Van Artsdalen	Submission (rear-naked choke)	Cage Fury FC 26: Sullivan vs. Martinez	August 17, 2013	1	3:55	Atlantic City, New Jersey, United States	Catchweight (150 lbs) bout.
Win	9–8 (1)	Tom Backman	KO (punches)	Locked in the Cage 15	April 13, 2013	1	0:44	New Kensington, Pennsylvania, United States	Lightweight bout.
Loss	8–8 (1)	Artur Rofi	Submission (arm-triangle choke)	Cage Fury FC 19: Sullivan vs. Lane	February 2, 2013	2	2:47	Atlantic City, New Jersey, United States	For Cage Fury Featherweight Championship.
Win	8–7 (1)	Brian van Hoven	Submission (guillotine choke)	Ring of Combat 41	June 15, 2012	2	2:27	Atlantic City, New Jersey, United States	Lightweight bout.
Loss	7–7 (1)	Scott Heckman	Submission (rear-naked choke)	Bellator 65	April 13, 2012	1	3:40	Atlantic City, New Jersey, United States	
Loss	7–6 (1)	Duane van Helvoirt	Submission (triangle choke)	Ring of Combat 39	February 10, 2012	1	1:49	Atlantic City, New Jersey, United States	Catchweight (150 lbs) bout.
Win	7–5 (1)	James Jones	TKO (punches)	Bellator 49	September 10, 2011	2	0:15	Atlantic City, New Jersey, United States	Catchweight (150 lbs) bout.
Loss	6–5 (1)	Eddie Fyvie	Decision (unanimous)	Cage Fury FC 7: No Mercy	April 16, 2011	3	5:00	Atlantic City, New Jersey, United States	
Loss	6–4 (1)	Kenny Foster	Decision (unanimous)	Bellator 33	October 21, 2010	3	5:00	Philadelphia, Pennsylvania, United States	
Win	6–3 (1)	Andy Main	Decision (unanimous)	Ring of Combat 28	February 19, 2010	3	4:00	Atlantic City, New Jersey, United States	
NC	5–3 (1)	Felipe Arantes	No Contest	Respect Is Earned 3: Philly Biker Brawl	October 10, 2009	3	3:06	Oaks, Pennsylvania, United States	
Win	5–3	Matt McManmon	Submission (armbar)	Ring of Combat 26	September 11, 2009	1	3:20	Atlantic City, New Jersey, United States	
Win	4–3	Kyle Gray	Submission (rear-naked choke)	World Cagefighting Alliance: Caged Combat	June 5, 2009	3	3:24	Atlantic City, New Jersey, United States	
Loss	3–3	Daniel Mason-Straus	Decision (split)	Extreme Challenge: Mayhem at the Marina	March 28, 2009	3	5:00	Atlantic City, New Jersey, United States	
Win	3–2	Joey Camacho	TKO (punches)	World Cagefighting Alliance: Pure Combat	February 6, 2009	1	0:51	Atlantic City, New Jersey, United States	
Loss	2–2	Tim Troxell	Submission (armbar)	Battle Cage Xtreme 5	July 12, 2008	1	4:47	Atlantic City, New Jersey, United States	
Loss	2–1	Pat Audinwood	Decision (unanimous)	Battle Cage Xtreme 4	April 19, 2008	3	5:00	Atlantic City, New Jersey, United States	
Win	2–0	Ryan McCarthy	Decision (unanimous)	Battle Cage Xtreme 3	October 20, 2007	3	5:00	Atlantic City, New Jersey, United States	
Win	1–0	Michael Murray	TKO (punches)	Extreme Challenge 81	July 28, 2007	2	3:36	West Orange, New Jersey, United States	
