= Ryan Quinn =

American mixed martial arts fighter

- Born: January 22, 1987 (age 39); The Bronx, New York, United States
- Nationality: American
- Height: 5 ft 9 in (1.75 m)
- Weight: 155 lb (70 kg; 11.1 st)
- Division: Welterweight; Lightweight
- Fighting out of: Coconut Creek, Florida, United States
- Team: American Top Team
- Rank: Black belt in Brazilian Jiu-Jitsu
- Years active: 2008-2017

Mixed martial arts record
- Total: 22
- Wins: 14
- By knockout: 2
- By submission: 4
- By decision: 8
- Losses: 7
- By knockout: 1
- By submission: 2
- By decision: 4
- Draws: 1

Other information
- Mixed martial arts record from Sherdog

Ryan Quinn (born January 22, 1987) is a retired American mixed martial artist. A professional competitor from 2008 until 2017, he competed for Bellator MMA, Titan FC, and CES MMA.

== Mixed martial arts career ==
=== Early career ===
Quinn began his MMA career in 2008, he went 2–1 in his first three fights before making his Bellator debut.

=== Bellator MMA ===
Quinn made his Bellator debut on April 22, 2010 against Matt Lee at Bellator 15. Quinn won the fight via unanimous decision.

Quinn then went 1–1 in smaller promotions before returning to the promotion and earning a unanimous decision win against Mike Winters at Bellator 39.

In his next bout for the promotion, Quinn faced Brett Oteri at Bellator 48 on August 20, 2011. Quinn defeated Oteri via technical submission due to a rear-naked choke in the first round.

At Bellator 63, Quinn faced Marc Stevens on March 30, 2012. Quinn won the fight by unanimous decision.

Quinn was expected to face Andrew Calandrelli at Bellator 98 on September 7, 2013, however Calandrelli was unable to fight due to a medical issue and was replaced by Brylan Van Artsdalen. Quinn won via submission in the first round.

Quinn then faced Andrew Calandrelli at Bellator 110 on February 28, 2014. Quinn won a unanimous decision.

Quinn faced Waylon Lowe at Bellator 140 on July 17, 2015. He won the fight by submission in the second round.

Quinn faced Saad Awad at Bellator 178 on April 21, 2017. He lost the back-and-forth fight via unanimous decision.

Quinn faced undefeated fighter Marcus Surin on October 20, 2017 at Bellator 185. He won the fight by unanimous decision.

== Mixed martial arts record ==
Professional record breakdown
22 matches	14 wins	7 losses
By knockout	2	1
By submission	4	2
By decision	8	4
Draws	1	

Res.	Record	Opponent	Method	Event	Date	Round	Time	Location	Notes
Win	14–7–1	Marcus Surin	Decision (unanimous)	Bellator 185	October 20, 2017	3	5:00	Uncasville, Connecticut, United States	
Loss	13–7–1	Saad Awad	Decision (unanimous)	Bellator 178	April 21, 2017	3	5:00	Uncasville, Connecticut, United States	
Win	13–6–1	Matt MacGrath	Decision (split)	Z Promotions Fight Night 3: Medicine Hat	October 28, 2016	3	5:00	Medicine Hat, Alberta, Canada	
Win	12–6–1	Brett Oteri	KO (punches)	Blockbuster MMA: The Rematch	June 26, 2016	3	0:31	Brockton, Massachusetts, United States	
Loss	11–6–1	Alexandr Shabliy	KO (head kick)	Akhmat Fighting Show 16: Grand Prix Akhmat 2016	March 12, 2016	3	0:13	Grozny, Russia	
Win	11–5–1	Waylon Lowe	Submission (guillotine choke)	Bellator 140	July 17, 2015	2	2:47	Uncasville, Connecticut, United States	
Loss	10–5–1	Milan Zerjal	Submission (rear-naked choke)	Titan FC 32	December 19, 2014	3	4:34	Lowell, Massachusetts, United States	
Win	10–4–1	Ryan Sanders	Decision (unanimous)	NEF: Fight Night 14	September 6, 2014	3	5:00	Lewiston, Maine, United States	Catchweight (165 lbs) bout.
Win	9–4–1	Andrew Calandrelli	Decision (unanimous)	Bellator 110	February 28, 2014	3	5:00	Uncasville, Connecticut, United States	
Win	8–4–1	Brylan Van Artsdalen	Submission (arm-triangle choke)	Bellator 98	September 7, 2013	1	2:34	Uncasville, Connecticut, United States	Lightweight debut.
Loss	7–4–1	Abner Lloveras	Decision (unanimous)	CES MMA: Proving Grounds	June 15, 2012	3	5:00	Lincoln, Rhode Island, United States	Catchweight (160 lbs) bout.
Win	7–3–1	Marc Stevens	Decision (unanimous)	Bellator 63	March 30, 2012	3	5:00	Uncasville, Connecticut, United States	Catchweight (165 lbs) bout.
Loss	6–3–1	Ricardo Funch	Decision (unanimous)	Premier Fighting Championship 7	December 3, 2011	3	5:00	Amherst, Massachusetts, United States	
Win	6–2–1	Brett Oteri	Technical Submission (rear-naked choke)	Bellator 48	August 20, 2011	1	1:49	Uncasville, Connecticut, United States	
Draw	5–2–1	Joe McGann	Draw	Reality Fighting: Mohegan Sun	May 21, 2011	3	5:00	Uncasville, Connecticut, United States	
Win	5–2	Mike Winters	Decision (unanimous)	Bellator 39	April 2, 2011	3	5:00	Uncasville, Connecticut, United States	
Win	4–2	Kevin Horowitz	TKO (doctor stoppage)	UCC 3: Renegades	September 10, 2010	2	2:52	Jersey City, New Jersey, United States	
Loss	3–2	Ian Stephens	Decision (unanimous)	XFC 11: The Next Generation	July 9, 2010	3	5:00	Tampa, Florida, United States	
Win	3–1	Matt Lee	Decision (unanimous)	Bellator 15	April 22, 2010	3	5:00	Uncasville, Connecticut, United States	
Loss	2–1	John Bachman	Submission (kneebar)	FFP: Untamed 28	June 19, 2009	1	0:55	Westport, Massachusetts, United States	
Win	2–0	Travis Coyle	Decision (unanimous)	World Championship Fighting 6	March 14, 2009	2	5:00	Wilmington, Massachusetts, United States	
Win	1–0	Chris Santacroce	Submission (rear-naked choke)	USFL: War in the Woods 2	February 23, 2008	1	1:29	Ledyard, Connecticut, United States	

== See also ==
- List of current Bellator fighters
