= Jay Haas (mixed martial artist) =

Armenian mixed martial arts fighter

- Born: July 30, 1990 (age 36); United States
- Height: 5 ft 7 in (1.70 m)
- Weight: 145 lb (66 kg; 10.4 st)
- Division: Lightweight; Featherweight; Bantamweight
- Fighting out of: Hanover, Pennsylvania, United States
- Team: Hanover Academy of MMA
- Years active: 2008-present

Mixed martial arts record
- Total: 33
- Wins: 15
- By knockout: 6
- By submission: 7
- By decision: 2
- Losses: 17
- By knockout: 1
- By submission: 16
- No contests: 1

Other information
- Mixed martial arts record from Sherdog

Jay Haas (born July 30, 1990) is an American mixed martial artist currently competing in the Featherweight division.

== Mixed martial arts record ==
Professional record breakdown
33 matches	15 wins	17 losses
By knockout	6	1
By submission	7	16
By decision	2	0
No contests	1	

Res.	Record	Opponent	Method	Event	Date	Round	Time	Location	Notes
Loss	15-17 (1)	Scott Heckman	Submission (brabo choke)	Maverick MMA 5: Heckman vs. Haas 3	February 17, 2018	2	0:59	Allentown, Pennsylvania, United States	
Loss	15-16 (1)	Scott Heckman	Submission (north-south choke)	Cage Fury FC 52: Horcher vs. Regman	October 31, 2015	2	1:17	Atlantic City, New Jersey, United States	Catchweight (141 lbs) bout.
Win	15-15 (1)	Ran Weathers	Decision (split)	Camp Lejeune: For the Leathernecks 4	September 2, 2015	3	4:00	Jacksonville, North Carolina, United States	
Loss	14-15 (1)	Brian Kelleher	Submission (guillotine choke)	Cage Fury FC 49: Honor vs. Oliveira	June 6, 2015	1	4:49	Bethlehem, Pennsylvania, United States	Catchweight (141 lbs) bout.
Win	14-14 (1)	Scott Heckman	Submission (triangle choke)	Cage Fury FC 47: Webb vs. Harshbarger	March 7, 2015	1	1:15	Bethlehem, Pennsylvania, United States	Catchweight (140 lbs) bout.
Win	13-14 (1)	Stacey Anderson	Submission (rear-naked choke)	Shogun Fights 11	November 15, 2014	1	1:51	Baltimore, Maryland, United States	Catchweight (143 lbs) bout.
Win	12-14 (1)	Evan Chmielski	TKO (punches)	Cage Fury FC 37: Anyanwu vs. Bell	June 28, 2014	1	3:13	Philadelphia, Pennsylvania, United States	Catchweight (140 lbs) bout.
Loss	11-14 (1)	Lester Caslow	Submission (guillotine choke)	Bellator 118	May 2, 2014	1	2:29	Atlantic City, New Jersey, United States	
Loss	11-13 (1)	Lester Caslow	Submission (guillotine choke)	Bellator CIX	November 22, 2013	3	2:44	Bethlehem, Pennsylvania, United States	
Loss	11-12 (1)	Ahsan Abdullah	TKO (punches)	Xtreme Caged Combat: Adrenaline	June 1, 2013	1	1:38	Wilkes-Barre, Pennsylvania, United States	
Win	11-11 (1)	Eddie Fyvie	TKO (punches)	Cage Fury FC 24: Sullivan vs. Becker	May 11, 2013	1	0:46	Atlantic City, New Jersey, United States	
Loss	10-11 (1)	Brylan Van Artsdalen	Submission (guillotine choke)	Bellator LXXIV	September 28, 2012	1	1:03	Atlantic City, New Jersey, United States	
Loss	10-10 (1)	Mike Bannon	Submission (kneebar)	PA Cage Fight 12	May 19, 2012	1	1:47	Olyphant, Pennsylvania, United States	
Loss	10-9 (1)	Kenny Foster	Submission (guillotine choke)	Bellator LXV	April 13, 2012	1	2:51	Atlantic City, New Jersey, United States	
Loss	10-8 (1)	Anthony Morrison	Submission (guillotine choke)	Cage Fury FC 13: Gambino vs. Foster	February 4, 2012	1	3:37	Atlantic City, New Jersey, United States	
Loss	10-7 (1)	Neil Johnson	Submission (rear-naked choke)	Pennsylvania FC 6	November 19, 2011	1	3:19	Harrisburg, Pennsylvania, United States	
Win	10-6 (1)	Nick Bleser	TKO (elbows)	Martial Arts Super Sport: Inauguration	July 16, 2011	1	3:25	Wilkes-Barre, Pennsylvania, United States	Catchweight (151 lbs) bout.
Win	9-6 (1)	Steve McCabe	Submission (armbar)	American MMA Fight League 2: Fight Night	June 4, 2011	1	0:49	Newtown, Pennsylvania, United States	
Loss	8-6 (1)	James Jones	Submission (rear-naked choke)	Shogun Fights 4	April 30, 2011	1	3:30	Baltimore, Maryland, United States	
Win	8-5 (1)	Michael Phillips	Decision (unanimous)	Pennsylvania FC 5	March 25, 2011	3	5:00	Harrisburg, Pennsylvania, United States	
Win	7-5 (1)	Steve Franklin	Submission (armbar)	Valley Fight League 29: Mason Dixon Showdown 5	January 29, 2011	1	0:42	Chambersburg, Pennsylvania, United States	
Win	6-5 (1)	Noe Quintanilla	Submission (rear-naked choke)	Central Pennsylvania Warrior Challenge 9	November 12, 2010	1	4:16	York, Pennsylvania, United States	
Win	5-5 (1)	Noe Quintanilla	Submission (rear-naked choke)	PA FC 3	June 26, 2010	1	2:55	Harrisburg, Pennsylvania, United States	
Win	4-5 (1)	Timothy Wade	TKO (punches)	Central Pennsylvania Warrior Challenge 5	April 15, 2010	2	0:51	York, Pennsylvania, United States	
Loss	3-5 (1)	Noe Quintanilla	Submission (rear-naked choke)	Northeast MMA: Cage Fight 3	January 29, 2010	1	3:13	Wilkes-Barre, Pennsylvania, United States	
Loss	3-4 (1)	Jim Hettes	Submission (heel hook)	Northeast MMA: Cage Fight 2	November 27, 2009	1	0:47	Scranton, Pennsylvania, United States	
Win	3-3 (1)	Michael Bunyamanop	TKO (punches)	PA FC 1	November 6, 2009	1	1:56	Harrisburg, Pennsylvania, United States	
Loss	2-3 (1)	Sean Santella	Submission (kneebar)	Central Pennsylvania Warrior Challenge 3	October 23, 2009	1	2:51	Lancaster, Pennsylvania, United States	
Loss	2-2 (1)	Doug Anderson	Submission (guillotine choke)	The Arena Assault	August 21, 2009	2	4:09	Philadelphia, Pennsylvania, United States	
NC	2-1 (1)	Preston Marks	No Contest	Central Pennsylvania Warrior Challenge 2	July 18, 2009	1	4:20	York, Pennsylvania, United States	
Win	2-1	Doug Sonier	Submission (armbar)	World Karate Union: Warrior Challenge in the Poconos	June 26, 2009	1	1:22	Pocono Manor, Pennsylvania, United States	
Loss	1-1	Will Childs	Submission (kneebar)	Central Pennsylvania Warrior Challenge 1	April 19, 2009	1	3:53	York, Pennsylvania, United States	
Win	1-0	Bao Khong	TKO (punches)	Gladiator Fight Club 4	September 27, 2008	2	1:40	Winchester, Virginia, United States	

== See also ==
- List of male mixed martial artists
