= Anthony Morrison =

American mixed martial arts fighter

- Born: Anthony Morrison; March 29, 1984 (age 42); Philadelphia, Pennsylvania, U.S.
- Other names: Cheesesteak
- Height: 5 ft 7 in (1.70 m)
- Weight: 145 lb (66 kg; 10.4 st)
- Division: Lightweight; Featherweight
- Reach: 69.0
- Style: Boxing, Wrestling
- Stance: Orthodox
- Fighting out of: Philadelphia, Pennsylvania, U.S.
- Team: Daddis Fight Camps; Team Combat
- Years active: 2004; 2006-2010, 2012-2013, 2015-2017

Mixed martial arts record
- Total: 33
- Wins: 20
- By knockout: 10
- By submission: 4
- By decision: 6
- Losses: 12
- By knockout: 4
- By submission: 7
- By decision: 1
- No contests: 1

Other information
- Mixed martial arts record from Sherdog

Anthony Morrison (born March 29, 1984) is an American professional mixed martial artist. A professional since 2004, he has competed for Bellator and the WEC.

== Background ==
Originally from North Philadelphia, Pennsylvania, Morrison began boxing at age 14 and competed in high school wrestling before deciding to compete in the MMA professionally.

== Mixed martial arts career ==
=== Early career ===
Morrison made his professional debut in 2004, and compiled a record of 16-8 before being signed by the WEC.

=== World Extreme Cagefigthting ===
Morrison made his promotional debut at WEC 46 against Mike Brown. He was defeated via first-round submission.

He later returned at WEC 48 against Chad Mendes, losing via first-round submission.

=== Post-WEC ===
After picking up four wins in the regional circuit, Morrison faced Jared Gordon for the CCFC Featherweight Championship. He was defeated via first-round knockout.

Morrison last fought in 2017, losing via unanimous decision.

== Mixed martial arts record ==
Professional record breakdown
33 matches	20 wins	12 losses
By knockout	10	4
By submission	4	7
By decision	6	1
Draws	0	
No contests	1	

Res.	Record	Opponent	Method	Event	Date	Round	Time	Location	Notes
Loss	20–12 (1)	Cody Stevens	Decision (unanimous)	RFO: Big Guns 24	June 10, 2017	3	5:00	Tallmadge, Ohio, United States	
Loss	20–11 (1)	Jared Gordon	KO (head kick)	CCFC 59: Morrison vs. Gordon	July 9, 2016	1	1:48	Philadelphia, Pennsylvania, United States	For the vacant CCFC Featherweight Championship.
Win	20–10 (1)	Jordan Stiner	Decision (unanimous)	CCFC 53: Spohn vs. Anyanwu	December 4, 2015	3	5:00	Philadelphia, Pennsylvania, United States	Lightweight bout.
Win	19–10 (1)	Ray Wood	Submission (guillotine choke)	NEF: Fight Night 16	February 7, 2015	5	3:02	Lewiston, Maine, United States	Won the NEF Featherweight Championship.
Win	18–10 (1)	Kenny Foster	Decision (majority)	Bellator 108	November 15, 2013	3	5:00	Atlantic City, New Jersey, United States	Catchweight (150 lb) bout.
Win	17–10 (1)	Jay Haas	Submission (guillotine choke)	CCFC 13: Gambino vs. Foster	February 4, 2012	1	3:37	Atlantic City, New Jersey, United States	
NC	16–10 (1)	Nick Gonzalez	No Contest	MF: Matrix Fights 2	June 11, 2010	3	1:09	Philadelphia, Pennsylvania, United States	
Loss	16–10	Chad Mendes	Submission (guillotine choke)	WEC 48	April 24, 2010	1	2:13	Sacramento, California, United States	
Loss	16–9	Mike Brown	Submission (rear-naked choke)	WEC 46	January 10, 2010	1	1:54	Sacramento, California, United States	
Win	16–8	Alvin Robinson	TKO (submission to punches)	ROF 36: Demolition	December 24, 2009	1	1:09	Denver, Colorado, United States	
Win	15–8	Jeff Lentz	Decision (unanimous)	ROC 27: Ring of Combat 27	November 20, 2009	3	5:00	Atlantic City, New Jersey, United States	Return to Featherweight; won the vacant ROC Featherweight Championship.
Loss	14–8	Micah Miller	Submission (arm-triangle choke)	Shine Fights 2: ATT vs. The World	September 4, 2009	2	4:25	Miami, Florida, United States	
Win	14–7	Tim Troxell	Decision (unanimous)	WCA: Caged Combat	June 5, 2009	3	5:00	Atlantic City, New Jersey, United States	
Win	13–7	Kevin Roddy	Decision (unanimous)	WCA: Pure Combat	February 6, 2009	3	3:00	Atlantic City, New Jersey, United States	
Loss	12–7	Fabio Mello	Submission (guillotine choke)	AOF 1: Rumble at Robarts 1	January 24, 2009	1	2:17	Sarasota, Florida, United States	
Win	12–6	Jay R. Palmer	Submission (armbar)	CSC: Combat Sports Challenge	August 30, 2008	2	1:51	Colonial Heights, Virginia, United States	
Win	11–6	Nelson Sobral	TKO (punches)	CSC: Combat Sports Challenge	June 14, 2008	1	1:10	Richmond, Virginia, United States	
Loss	10–6	Eddie Fyvie	Submission (triangle choke)	ROC 19: Ring of Combat 19	May 9, 2008	1	3:47	Atlantic City, New Jersey, United States	Return to Lightweight.
Win	10–5	Alvin Decker	TKO (punches)	CSC 24: The Proving Ground	March 25, 2008	1	2:28	Richmond, Virginia, United States	
Win	9–5	Anthony Biondo	TKO	CSC: Combat Sports Challenge	February 24, 2008	1	2:08	Richmond, Virginia, United States	
Loss	8–5	Ricardo Tirloni	KO	CSC: Combat Sports Challenge	September 29, 2007	1	0:40	Richmond, Virginia, United States	Lightweight bout.
Win	8–4	Dan Swift	Submission (kneebar)	CSC: Combat Sports Challenge	July 14, 2007	2	4:32	Colonial Heights, Virginia, United States	
Loss	7–4	Jim Miller	Submission (triangle choke)	CCFC 5: Two Worlds, One Cage	June 23, 2007	1	4:56	Atlantic City, New Jersey, United States	Lightweight bout.
Win	7–3	Patrick Upton	TKO (punches)	CSC: Combat Sports Challenge	April 28, 2007	1	2:53	Mechanicsville, Virginia, United States	
Win	6–3	Spencer Paige	Decision (unanimous)	CFFC 4: Cage Fury Fighting Championships 4	April 13, 2007	3	5:00	Atlantic City, New Jersey, United States	Catchweight (150 lb) bout.
Win	5–3	Travis Worsencroft	TKO (punches)	CSC: Combat Sports Challenge	March 24, 2007	1	1:04	Mechanicsville, Virginia, United States	
Win	4–3	Matt Andrews	TKO (punches)	CSC: River City Rumble 5	December 9, 2006	1	3:35	Mechanicsville, Virginia, United States	
Loss	3–3	Frank Johnson	TKO (punches)	IFC: Rumble on the River 2	November 10, 2006	1	2:36	Kearney, Nebraska, United States	
Win	3–2	Aaron Steele	KO (punch)	IFC: Rumble on the River 2	November 10, 2006	1	0:20	Kearney, Nebraska, United States	Return to Featherweight.
Loss	2–2	Deividas Taurosevicius	Submission (triangle choke)	CFFC 2: Cage Fury Fighting Championships 2	October 6, 2006	1	2:09	Atlantic City, New Jersey, United States	Lightweight debut.
Win	2–1	Will Loushin	TKO (punches)	CFFC 1: Cage Fury Fighting Championships 1	June 30, 2006	1	0:57	Atlantic City, New Jersey, United States	
Loss	1–1	Steve Hallock	TKO	Dangerzone: Fight Night 13	March 13, 2004	2	1:37	Angola, Indiana, United States	
Win	1–0	Justin Hamm	Submission	Dangerzone: Fight Night 13	March 13, 2004	1	3:08	Angola, Indiana, United States	
