= Anthony Leone (fighter) =

American mixed martial arts fighter

- Born: May 27, 1987 (age 39); Center Moriches, New York, United States
- Height: 5 ft 6 in (1.68 m)
- Weight: 136 lb (62 kg; 9.7 st)
- Division: Featherweight; Bantamweight; Flyweight
- Reach: 63 in (160 cm)
- Fighting out of: Center Moriches, New York, United States
- Team: Bali Muay Thai & MM Camp; Team Bombsquad; Phuket Top Team
- Years active: 2008–present

Mixed martial arts record
- Total: 26
- Wins: 17
- By submission: 9
- By decision: 8
- Losses: 9
- By knockout: 2
- By submission: 4
- By decision: 3

Other information
- Mixed martial arts record from Sherdog

Anthony Leone (born May 27, 1987) is an American professional mixed martial artist who most recently competed in the Bantamweight division. A professional competitor since 2008, he has competed for Strikeforce, the WEC, Bellator MMA, and Absolute Championship Berkut.

== Background ==
Leone went to Center Moriches High School in New York and then went to college at The University of Hawaii at Hilo.

At the age of 20, Leone spent 11 months training alongside at the B.J. Penn Mixed Martial Arts academy in Hilo, Hawaii. Anthony splits his training time between Phuket Top Team in Phuket, Thailand, and Team Bomb Squad in New York.

His brother Andrew Leone is a MMA fighter as well and competes in the Flyweight division.

== Mixed martial arts career ==
After going 8–0 in regional shows, Leone signed with World Extreme Cagefighting. Leone lost to Renan Barão at WEC 49 and was released from the promotion.

=== Bellator MMA ===
Leone then signed with the Bellator MMA and came in to fight as a late replacement. He lost to Georgi Karakhanyan at Bellator 28.

He faced Jeff Lentz at Bellator 44 on May 14, 2011, and lost via unanimous decision.

Leone faced Claudio Ledesma at Bellator 68 on May 11, 2012. Leone won the fight via split decision.

Leone defeated former Bellator Bantamweight Champion Zach Makovsky at Bellator 83 via split decision.

On July 31, 2013, Leone defeated Frank Baca at Bellator 97 in the Semifinals of the Bellator 2013 Summer Series Bantamweight Tournament via rear naked choke.

On October 4, 2013, Leone was defeated by Rafael Silva at Bellator 102 in the Finals of the Bellator 2013 Summer Series Bantamweight Tournament via unanimous decision. However, Silva suffered a knee injury and Leone was called to step in and fight Eduardo Dantas for the Bellator Bantamweight Championship on March 7, 2014, at Bellator 111. After winning the first round, Leone lost in the second round due to a rear-naked choke submission.

Leone has since part ways with Bellator.

=== Absolute Championship Berkut ===
Leone faced Chechen super star MMA prospect Rasul Albaskhanov at ACB 49: Rostov onslaught on 26 November 2016. He won the fight via submission in the third round.

== Championships and accomplishments ==
- Bellator MMA
  - Bellator 2013 Summer Series Bantamweight Tournament Runner-Up

== Mixed martial arts record ==
Professional record breakdown
26 matches	17 wins	9 losses
By knockout	0	2
By submission	9	4
By decision	8	3

Res.	Record	Opponent	Method	Event	Date	Round	Time	Location	Notes
Loss	17–9	Denis Lavrentyev	TKO (corner stoppage)	RCC Intro 3	March 9, 2019	2	5:00	Ekaterinburg, Russia	
Win	17–8	Magomed Ginazov	Decision (unanimous)	ACB 85: Leone vs. Ginazov	April 21, 2018	3	5:00	Rimini, Italy	
Win	16–8	Dean Garnett	Submission (guillotine choke)	ACB 76: Young Eagles 23	December 9, 2017	2	4:40	Gold Coast, Australia	Returned to Bantamweight.
Loss	15–8	Askar Askarov	Submission (twister)	ACB 58: Young Eagles 17	April 22, 2017	3	2:49	Khasavyurt, Russia	For the ACB Flyweight Championship.
Win	15–7	Rasul Albaskhanov	Submission (guillotine choke)	ACB 49: Rostov Onslaught	November 26, 2016	3	0:28	Rostov-on-Don, Russia	
Win	14–7	Shamil Magomedov	Submission (rear-naked choke)	WFCA 16: Grand Prix Akhmat	March 12, 2016	2	4:46	Grozny, Russia	Grand Prix Akhmat 2016 Tournament Quarterfinals; Flyweight debut.
Loss	13–7	Eduardo Dantas	Submission (rear-naked choke)	Bellator 111	March 7, 2014	2	2:04	Thackerville, Oklahoma, United States	For Bellator Bantamweight Championship.
Loss	13–6	Rafael Silva	Decision (unanimous)	Bellator 102	October 4, 2013	3	5:00	Visalia, California, United States	Bellator 2013 Summer Series Bantamweight Tournament Final.
Win	13–5	Frank Baca	Submission (rear-naked choke)	Bellator 97	July 31, 2013	3	1:07	Rio Rancho, New Mexico, United States	Bellator 2013 Summer Series Bantamweight Tournament Semifinal.
Win	12–5	Zach Makovsky	Decision (split)	Bellator 83	December 7, 2012	3	5:00	Atlantic City, New Jersey, United States	
Win	11–5	Claudio Ledesma	Decision (split)	Bellator 68	May 11, 2012	3	5:00	Atlantic City, New Jersey, United States	Bantamweight debut.
Win	10–5	Paul Gorman	Submission (armbar)	New England Fights: Fight Night	February 11, 2012	2	2:11	Lewiston, Maine, United States	Catchweight (139 lbs) bout.
Loss	9–5	Brylan Van Artsdalen	Technical Submission (guillotine choke)	XFE: Cage Wars 8: House of Pain	July 29, 2011	1	1:45	Atlantic City, New Jersey, United States	
Win	9–4	Bill Jones	Decision (unanimous)	World Championship Fighting 11	June 18, 2011	3	5:00	Wilmington, Massachusetts, United States	
Loss	8–4	Jeff Lentz	Decision (unanimous)	Bellator 44	May 14, 2011	3	5:00	Atlantic City, New Jersey, United States	
Loss	8–3	Josh LaBerge	TKO (doctor stoppage)	Strikeforce: Fedor vs. Silva	February 12, 2011	1	5:00	East Rutherford, New Jersey, United States	
Loss	8–2	Georgi Karakhanyan	Decision (unanimous)	Bellator 28	September 9, 2010	3	5:00	New Orleans, Louisiana, United States	
Loss	8–1	Renan Barão	Submission (armbar)	WEC 49	June 20, 2010	3	2:29	Edmonton, Alberta, Canada	Catchweight (142 lbs) bout.
Win	8–0	Tateki Matsuda	Decision (split)	Xtreme Championship Fight League 2	March 26, 2010	5	5:00	Lowell, Massachusetts, United States	
Win	7–0	Doug Sonier	Submission (armbar)	Blood Brothers MMA 2	November 28, 2008	1	1:27	Akwesasne, New York, United States	
Win	6–0	Dustin Pague	Submission (choke)	PA Fighting Championships 1	November 6, 2009	2	4:58	Harrisburg, Pennsylvania, United States	
Win	5–0	Chris Grandmaison	Decision (unanimous)	World Championship Fighting 6	March 14, 2009	2	5:00	Wilmington, Massachusetts, United States	
Win	4–0	Pat White	Submission (rear-naked choke)	WCA: Pure Combat	February 6, 2009	1	4:36	Atlantic City, New Jersey, United States	
Win	3–0	Jeff Denz	Decision (unanimous)	RW 2: Rage in the Cage	January 24, 2009	3	3:00	Irving, New York, United States	
Win	2–0	Chris Correira	Submission (armbar)	Cage Fight: MMA 3	November 8, 2008	1	1:49	Bedford, New Hampshire, United States	
Win	1–0	Tyler Kahihikolo	Decision	ROTR: Beatdown 7	June 28, 2008	N/A	N/A	Hawaii, United States	
