= Kenny Foster =

American mixed martial arts fighter

- Born: June 16, 1985 (age 41)
- Other names: The Tooth Fairy
- Nationality: American
- Height: 5 ft 8 in (1.73 m)
- Weight: 146 lb (66 kg; 10.4 st)
- Division: Lightweight; Featherweight; Bantamweight
- Reach: 68.0 in (173 cm)
- Stance: Southpaw
- Fighting out of: Bohemia, New York, United States
- Team: Maxum BJJ & MMA
- Rank: NCAA Division II Wrestling
- Years active: 2009–present

Mixed martial arts record
- Total: 25
- Wins: 12
- By knockout: 1
- By submission: 5
- By decision: 6
- Losses: 13
- By knockout: 1
- By submission: 6
- By decision: 6

Other information
- University: Carson–Newman College
- Mixed martial arts record from Sherdog

Kenny Foster (born June 16, 1985) is an American mixed martial artist. A professional mixed martial artist since 2009, Foster has competed for Bellator, holding a record of 3–6 with the promotion.

== Mixed martial arts career ==
Foster made his professional MMA debut in February 2009. He amassed a record of 7–2 before signing with Bellator Fighting Championships.

=== Bellator Fighting Championships ===
Foster made his Bellator debut on October 21, 2010, at Bellator 33 where he defeated Lester Caslow via unanimous decision.

In January 2011, Bellator announced that Foster will be a part of the Bellator Season 4 Featherweight Tournament and will face 4 time NCAA Division I All American wrestler, Eric Larkin. At Bellator 37, Foster won via guillotine choke in round 1 to move on to the semifinals.

At Bellator 41, he then faced Daniel Mason-Straus, who was on an 11 fight win streak before entering the fight. He lost the fight via guillotine choke in round 3.

Foster appeared on the Bellator 53 card against Englishmen, Ronnie Mann. The fight was billed as a qualifier fight for the sixth season featherweight tournament. Foster lost the fight in the first round via submission (triangle choke).

Foster took an off fight from Bellator when he competed for Cage Fury Fighting Championships on February 4, 2012. Foster fought undefeated prospect Joey Gambino in the main event for the featherweight championship. Foster lost the fight via unanimous decision.

Foster was scheduled to fight Bobby Reardanz on the undercard of Bellator 60 replacing Mike Corey after Corey was asked to replace an injured Wagnney Fabiano in the season six featherweight tournament. However, after weigh-in issues forced Genair da Silva out of the featherweight tournament, Foster was asked to take his place in the tournament and fight Alexandre Bezerra in the opening round. He lost via submission (rear naked choke) in the second round.

Foster then made a quick turnaround and faced Jay Haas at Bellator 65 on April 13, 2012. He won the fight via guillotine choke. He faced Claudio Ledesma at Bellator 74 on September 28, 2012. He lost the fight via unanimous decision.

After a short hiatus from MMA, Foster returned to Bellator and faced Anthony Morrison at Bellator 108 on November 15, 2013. He lost the fight via majority decision. Foster then faced Chris Piriz at Bellator 110 on February 28, 2014. He lost the fight via unanimous decision, dropping him to 3–7 in his last ten fights.

=== Other promotions ===
Foster faced Andy Main at CFFC 36: Secor vs. Good on June 21, 2014. He won the fight via split decision.

Foster faced Mike Santiago for the vacant ROC Featherweight Championship on January 23, 2015, at Ring of Combat 50. He lost the fight via guillotine choke submission in the first round.

== Mixed martial arts record ==
Professional record breakdown
25 matches	12 wins	13 losses
By knockout	1	1
By submission	5	6
By decision	6	6

Res.	Record	Opponent	Method	Event	Date	Round	Time	Location	Notes
Loss	12–13	Jacob Bohn	Decision (split)	CES NY 1	May 4, 2018	3	5:00	Westbury, New York, United States	Lightweight debut.
Loss	12–12	Tim Dooling	Decision (split)	Ring of Combat 60	September 15, 2017	3	4:00	Atlantic City, New Jersey, United States	
Win	12–11	Joe Pingitore	Decision (unanimous)	CES 42	March 31, 2017	3	5:00	Lincoln, Rhode Island, United States	
Loss	11–11	Calvin Kattar	Decision (split)	CES 34	April 1, 2016	3	5:00	Atlantic City, New Jersey, United States	Catchweight (150 lb) bout.
Loss	11–11	Lester Caslow	Submission (guillotine choke)	Ring of Combat 50	November 20, 2015	3	2:04	Atlantic City, New Jersey, United States	
Loss	11–10	Mike Santiago	Submission (guillotine choke)	Ring of Combat 50	January 23, 2015	1	1:33	Atlantic City, New Jersey, United States	For the vacant ROC Featherweight Championship.
Win	11–9	Andy Main	Decision (split)	CFFC 36: Secor vs. Good	June 21, 2014	3	5:00	Morristown, New Jersey, United States	
Loss	10–9	Chris Piriz	Decision (unanimous)	Bellator 110	February 28, 2014	3	5:00	Uncasville, Connecticut, United States	
Loss	10–8	Anthony Morrison	Decision (majority)	Bellator 108	November 15, 2013	3	5:00	Atlantic City, New Jersey, United States	Catchweight (150 lb) bout.
Loss	10–7	Claudio Ledesma	Decision (unanimous)	Bellator 74	September 28, 2012	3	5:00	Atlantic City, New Jersey, United States	Bantamweight debut.
Win	10–6	Jay Haas	Submission (guillotine choke)	Bellator 65	April 13, 2012	1	2:51	Atlantic City, New Jersey, United States	
Loss	9–6	Alexandre Bezerra	Submission (rear naked choke)	Bellator 60	March 9, 2012	2	4:57	Hammond, Indiana, United States	Bellator Season 6 Featherweight Tournament Quarterfinal.
Loss	9–5	Joey Gambino	Decision (unanimous)	Cage Fury Fighting Championships 13	February 4, 2012	5	5:00	Atlantic City, New Jersey, United States	For the CFFC Featherweight Championship.
Loss	9–4	Ronnie Mann	Submission (triangle choke)	Bellator 53	October 8, 2011	1	3:51	Miami, Oklahoma, United States	
Loss	9–3	Daniel Mason-Straus	Submission (guillotine choke)	Bellator 41	April 16, 2011	3	3:48	Yuma, Arizona, United States	Bellator Season 4 Featherweight Tournament Semifinal.
Win	9–2	Eric Larkin	Submission (guillotine choke)	Bellator 37	March 19, 2011	1	3:15	Concho, Oklahoma, United States	Bellator Season 4 Featherweight Tournament Quarterfinal.
Win	8–2	Lester Caslow	Decision (unanimous)	Bellator 33	October 21, 2010	3	5:00	Philadelphia, Pennsylvania, United States	
Loss	7–2	Donny Walker	TKO (punches)	EFC: Downtown Beatdown 3	June 12, 2010	3	0:52	Erie, Pennsylvania, United States	
Win	7–1	Marcos Rodrigues	TKO (punches)	UCC 1: Merciless	March 19, 2010	1	2:39	Jersey City, New Jersey, United States	
Win	6–1	Joel Roberts	Decision (split)	PFC: PA Fighting Championships 2	February 7, 2010	3	5:00	Harrisburg, Pennsylvania, United States	
Win	5–1	Doug Sonier	Submission (arm-triangle choke)	True Cage Warriors: Cage Wars 1	November 21, 2009	1	1:24	Irving, New York, United States	
Win	4–1	Chris Foster	Submission (rear-naked choke)	CFX: Wartown Beatdown 4	November 13, 2009	1	4:41	Worcester, Massachusetts, United States	Won the vacant NECF Featherweight Championship.
Win	3–1	Travis Lerchen	Submission	American Steel Cagefighting 2	September 11, 2009	2	N/A	Salem, New Hampshire, United States	
Win	2–1	Mervin Rodriguez	Decision (unanimous)	American Steel Cagefighting 1	July 31, 2009	3	3:00	Salem, New Hampshire, United States	
Loss	1–1	Mackens Semerzier	Submission (triangle choke)	Elite Fighting Challenge 4	June 27, 2009	1	1:03	Norfolk, Virginia, United States	
Win	1–0	Mark Getto	Decision (unanimous)	WCA: Pure Combat	February 6, 2009	3	5:00	Atlantic City, New Jersey, United States	
