= Hasami jime =

Judo technique

- Classification: Chokehold
- Style: Judo
- AKA: Fastening choke

Hasami jime is a chokehold in judo. It is described in The Canon of Judo and demonstrated by Kyuzo Mifune in the video The Essence of Judo.
