= Andrew Calandrelli =

American mixed martial arts fighter

- Born: New Haven, Connecticut, U.S.
- Height: 5 ft 9 in (1.75 m)
- Weight: 155 lb (70 kg; 11.1 st)
- Division: Lightweight
- Reach: 69 in (180 cm)
- Fighting out of: New Haven, Connecticut, U.S.
- Team: Ultimate MMA
- Years active: 2004–2014

Mixed martial arts record
- Total: 10
- Wins: 6
- By submission: 4
- By decision: 2
- Losses: 4
- By knockout: 1
- By decision: 3

Other information
- Mixed martial arts record from Sherdog

Andrew Calandrelli, Jr. is an American retired mixed martial artist. A professional from 2004 until 2014, he competed in Bellator MMA.

== Mixed martial arts career ==
=== Early career ===
Calandrelli made his professional MMA debut in 2004. He amassed a record of 4–3 before signing with Bellator.

=== Bellator MMA ===
Calandrelli made his Bellator debut at Bellator 48 on August 20, 2011. He faced Matt Nice and won via keylock submission in the first round.

Calandrelli next faced Eric Brown at Bellator 81 on November 16, 2012. He won via armbar submission in the second round.

Over a year away from the cage, Calandrelli eventually returned and faced American Top Team fighter Ryan Quinn in a fight that was originally expected to take place at Bellator 98, but was cancelled prior to the fight due to a medical issue. He lost the fight via unanimous decision.

== Mixed martial arts record ==
Professional record breakdown
10 matches	6 wins	4 losses
By knockout	0	1
By submission	4	0
By decision	2	3

Res.	Record	Opponent	Method	Event	Date	Round	Time	Location	Notes
Loss	6–4	Ryan Quinn	Decision (unanimous)	Bellator 110	February 28, 2014	3	5:00	Uncasville, Connecticut, United States	
Win	6–3	Eric Brown	Submission (armbar)	Bellator 81	November 16, 2012	2	3:10	Kingston, Rhode Island, United States	
Win	5–3	Matt Nice	Submission (keylock)	Bellator 48	August 20, 2011	1	3:55	Uncasville, Connecticut, United States	
Loss	4–3	Mark Berrocal	KO (punches)	ROC 16: Beast of the Northeast Semi-Finals	October 26, 2007	1	0:35	Atlantic City, New Jersey, United States	
Win	4–2	Doug Gordon	Decision (majority)	ROC 15: Beast of the Northeast Quarterfinals	September 7, 2007	2	4:00	Atlantic City, New Jersey, United States	
Win	3–2	Jason Hathaway	Submission (rear-naked choke)	CZ 17: Take Control	August 5, 2006	1	3:39	Revere, Massachusetts, United States	
Win	2–2	Lionel Cortez	Decision (unanimous)	ECFA: Colosseum	June 17, 2005	2	5:00	Massachusetts, United States	
Win	1–2	Jason Hathaway	Submission (rear-naked choke)	CZ 9: Hot Like Fire	December 4, 2004	1	3:52	Revere, Massachusetts, United States	
Loss	0–2	Rich Moskowitz	Decision (unanimous)	CZ 8: Street Justice	October 2, 2004	3	5:00	Revere, Massachusetts, United States	
Loss	0–1	Rich Moskowitz	Decision (unanimous)	Last Man Standing	June 5, 2004	3	5:00	Fitchburg, Massachusetts, United States	
