= Nova União (mixed martial arts) =

Mixed martial arts training organization in Brazil

Coordinates: 22.936352°S 43.177546°W

- Est.: 1995; 31 years ago
- Founded by: André Pederneiras; Wendell Alexander
- Current titleholders: None
- Past titleholders: José Aldo Featherweight Champion (UFC 2011-2015, 2016-2017), (WEC 2009-2010) 145 lb (66 kg; 10.4 st); B.J. Penn Lightweight Champion (UFC 2007-2010) 155 lb (70 kg; 11.1 st), Welterweight Champion (UFC 2004) 170 lb (77 kg; 12 st); Renan Barão Bantamweight Champion (UFC 2013-2014) Interim (UFC 2012-2013) 145 lb (66 kg; 10.4 st); Junior dos Santos Heavyweight Champion (UFC 2011-2012) 238 lb (108 kg; 17.0 st); Eduardo Dantas Bantamweight Champion (Bellator 2012-2014) 135 lb (61 kg; 9.6 st)
- Training facilities: Rio de Janeiro, Brazil
- Website: www.novauniao.com

Nova União (Portuguese pronunciation: [ˈnɔvɐ uniˈɐ̃w]) is a Brazilian jiu-jitsu (BJJ) academy and mixed martial arts team located in Rio de Janeiro, Brazil. It is one of the top professional MMA training camps. Their BJJ black belts have participated in BJJ, submission grappling and MMA competitions all over the world.

B.J. Penn's victory at the Mundials marked the first time a non-Brazilian native won gold in the black belt category. Since 2008 Nova União has become a familiar name in the mixed martial arts scene as a result of stabling the former #1 ranked featherweight fighter in the world, José Aldo, as well as Renan Barão, the former UFC Bantamweight champion, and another top ten ranked featherweight in Marlon Sandro.

== Jiu Jitsu ==
The Nova União jiu jitsu team was recently re-organized by two 1st generation black belts under André Pederneiras in the United States. Gustavo Dantas, President, and Robson Moura, Vice-President, have been charged with overseeing the new changes. The team was created by Wendell Alexander and André Pederneiras, and is known primarily for its lightweight fighters. The competition team is usually reserved for the top four competitors during that time period.

Nowadays they have gyms around the World from East to West in cities and countries such as Bangkok, Phuket (Thailand), Australia, the United States, Zurich (Switzerland), Canada, etc.

== Notable members ==
Current and former members of the team include:

- José Aldo - Former two-time UFC Featherweight Champion, 7 title defenses, former UFC Interim Featherweight Champion, the last WEC Featherweight Champion, 2 title defenses
- Renan Barão - Former UFC Bantamweight Champion, 1 successful title defense, former UFC Interim Bantamweight Champion.
- B.J. Penn - Former UFC Welterweight and UFC Lightweight Champion, three Lightweight title defenses. The second person in UFC history to have been champion of two divisions.
- Junior dos Santos - Former UFC Heavyweight Champion, 1 title defense.
- Eduardo Dantas - Former two-time Bellator Bantamweight World Champion, 2 title defenses in first reign, 1 title defense in the second.
- Claudia Gadelha - Former UFC Women's Strawweight title challenger.
- Pedro Rizzo - Former UFC 3-Time Heavyweight Title Challenger, Pride FC veteran, Affliction veteran.
- Thales Leites - Former UFC Middleweight Title Challenger.
- Leonardo Santos - TUF Brazil 2 winner.
- Marcos Galvão - Former Bellator Bantamweight World Champion.
- Hacran Dias - Current UFC Featherweight fighter.
- Ronny Markes - Former UFC Middleweight fighter.
- Caio Magalhaes - Current UFC Middleweight fighter.
- Carlos Eduardo - Former Bellator MMA Light Heavyweight fighter and Current Shooto Light Heavyweight Champion.
- Luis Ramos - Former Shooto Middleweight (168 lb) Champion and former UFC welterweight fighter.
- Marlon Sandro - Current Bellator featherweight fighter, current Pancrase and former World Victory Road Featherweight Champion.
- Wagnney Fabiano - Former IFL Featherweight Champion and TKO World Super-Lightweight Championship.
- Renato Verissimo - Former UFC welterweight fighter.
- Gray Maynard - Former UFC fighter and 2-Time Lightweight Title Challenger.
- Jussier Formiga - Current UFC Flyweight fighter and contender.
- Gustavo Dantas - Nova União Jiu Jitsu President in the United States.
- Tony DeSouza - UFC veteran and inventor of the "Peruvian Necktie" submission.
- Robson Moura - Eight-time Mundial World Champion in BJJ. Split from Nova União and developed his own association, RMNU Academy (Robson Moura Nations United), with locations over the United States, as well as Canada, Ireland, Germany, and Brazil.
- João Roque - UFC veteran, one of the original Nova União fighters and 5th degree black belt in Brazilian jiu-jitsu.
- Vítor Ribeiro - Former Shooto Welterweight (154 lb) Champion and Cage Rage World Lightweight Champion.
- Norman Paraisy - Former Bellator Middleweight Contender.
- T. J. Grant - Former UFC Lightweight fighter and former contender.
- Diego Nunes - Former WEC and UFC fighter, current Bellator Featherweight contender.
- Marcelo Pereira a jiu-jitsu black belt under Wendell Alexander & Andre Pederneiras who was part of the revered Nova Uniao lightweight squad of the late 1990s and early 2000s, a time when he conquered an International Brazilian Jiu-Jitsu Federation (IBJJF) World title as well as repeated Brazilian Nationals gold medals before relocating to the United States in 2006 where he started his academy, Marcelo Pereira Jiu-Jitsu.

== See also ==
- List of professional MMA training camps
- Luiz França
- Oswaldo Fadda
