= Gustavo Dantas =

Brazilian martial artist

Gustavo Dantas (born 23 December 1974 in Rio de Janeiro, Brazil), is a sixth degree Black Belt in Brazilian jiu-jitsu from André Pederneiras. With nearly 20 years of coaching experience and being a world class competitor, Gustavo is a public speaker as well as a certified mental and life coach with a bachelor's degree in Physical Education from UFRJ (Universidade Federal do Rio de Janeiro). Gustavo left Brazil in 1999 with a couple thousand dollars, two bags, and one teenage dream: to have his own 100% Jiu-Jitsu Academy and make his living through the passion of his life, Jiu-Jitsu. The Gustavo Dantas Jiu-Jitsu Academy was established in Tempe, Arizona on March 6, 2012, re-enforcing the statement, "Believe in yourself, believe in your dreams. Hard work pays off."

Gustavo was the Jiu-Jitsu coach of the Mixed Martial Arts Gym, Arizona Combat Sports for eleven years, where he achieved his 2-0 MMA record. During that time, Gustavo started the mission of promoting Jiu-Jitsu in the State of Arizona, becoming the vice-president of the Arizona State Brazilian jiu-jitsu Federation and turning a small, 40 competitor, "in-house" tournament in 2001 to a 700 competitor tournament in 2011, helping Arizona to be recognized as one of the Jiu-Jitsu power houses in the United States.

Gustavo, who is also the co-founder of the non-profit organization Live Jiu-Jitsu, continues to build champions on and off the mat in Arizona, and he hopes to spread out his coaching philosophy to more Jiu-Jitsu practitioners around the world for years to come through his program "Inner Discovery for Outer Success." "I want to help people to perform to the best of their abilities and reach their full potential on and off the mat. I struggled with performance anxiety before, and I was able to overcome it using the techniques that I share at my program. These concepts, fundamentals and techniques helped me, and I believe this program can help others too," stated The BJJ Mental Coach, Gustavo Dantas.

== Accomplishments ==
Gustavo is an accomplished Brazilian jiu-jitsu competitor, with career highlights including:

- 2014 IBJJF World Masters Silver medalist (Black/Master 2/Feather)
- 2014 IBJJF Long Beach International Open Champion (Black/Adult/Feather) CA, USA
- 2014 IBJJF U.S. National Champion (Black/Master 2/Light) CA, USA
- 2014 IBJJF Vegas Spring International Open Champion (Black/Master 2/Light) NV, USA
- 2014 UAEJJF Abu Dhabi World Pro Jiu-Jitsu Champion (Black/Master 2/feather) Abu Dhabi, U.A.E.
- 2012 IBJJF World Champion (Black/Master 2/Feather) CA, USA
- 2012 IBJJF U.S. National Champion (Black/Master 2/Feather) CA, USA
- 2010 IBJJF Vegas International Open Champion (Black/Master 1/Feather) NV, USA
- 2010 IBJJF International Master & Senior Champion (Black/Master 2/Feather) RJ, Brazil
- 2009 Rickson Gracie Cup 2009 Japan (1st place)
- 2008 Brazilian National Champion
- 2002 World Cup bronze medalist
- 98 & 99 International Championships (1st place)
- 98 Rio de Janeiro State Champion
- 97 & 98 World Champion
- 97 National Champion
- 96 World Championships (3rd place)

The GD Jiu-Jitsu/Nova Uniao Arizona competition team has achieved success in National Brazilian jiu-jitsu Competition, including:

Team GD Jiu-Jitsu is the most active Nova Uniao branch in the United States. Gustavo Dantas has been building champions on the mat and in life since October 2000 in Tempe, Arizona. Team GD Jiu-Jitsu has been rated #1 School in the Adult Division at the AZSBJJF Ranking from 2009 to 2014, and #1 School in the kids division at the AZSBJJF Ranking in 2011 and 2012. Additionally, their competitors have international titles in the world's most prestigious tournament operated by the IBJJF (International Brazilian jiu-jitsu Federation), the World Championship (Mundial). To date Team GD has secured over 30 World Jiu-Jitsu Championship medals.

== Students ==
Black belts under Gustavo include Steve Judson, Gary Matsch, Brian Mitchell, Chris Lopez, Steve Rosenberg, Bob Merriman, Michael Westbrook, Morris Williams, Mannie Romero, Trevor Rivers, Mark Moore, Micah Phillips, Jonathan Wagner, Paul Nava, Jake Gaston, Fernando Armenta, Jacob McClintock, Joe Daley, Mike Lin, Pedro Diaz, Christian Diaz, Josh Guerra, Ryan Sims, Brandon Khalil, Paul Slaybaugh, Paul Manganaro, Michael Velasquez, Ryan Heilman and Sarah Black.
