= Media Club of Canada =

- Formation: 1904
- Dissolved: 2004
- Type: Professional journalism organization
- Legal status: defunct
- Headquarters: Canada
- Region served: Canada
- Official language: English, French
- Formerly called: Canadian Women's Press Club (CWPC)

The Media Club of Canada was a professional organization of Canadian journalists, active from 1904 to the early 1990s. It was originally known as the Canadian Women's Press Club (CWPC) before 1971, when it was only open to women journalists.

The organization was established after Margaret Graham convinced a railway publicity agent to transport 16 women journalists to the Louisiana Purchase Exposition in St. Louis, Missouri, and the agent subsequently suggested they form their own press club.

Early members of the group included Kit Coleman, Nellie McClung, Emily Murphy, and Helen MacGill. The organization's activities included an annual awards presentation for the best work in journalism by its members. Non-fiction author Erna Paris produced a radio documentary on their work.

The Media Club of Canada unincorporated in the early 2000s.

== History as CWPC ==
In June 1904, journalist and feminist Margaret "Miggsy" Graham, Ottawa correspondent of the Halifax Herald, went to see Col. George Ham, publicity agent for the Canadian Pacific Railway, at Montréal’s Windsor Station. Graham reportedly asked him directly, "Can you tell my why your road has taken men to all the excursions and Fairs and other things and has ignobly ignored us, the weaker sex?" Ham promised that if Graham could find 12 professional women journalists, he would send them to the Louisiana Purchase Exposition in St. Louis, Missouri.

Graham found 16 qualified women (half anglophone, half francophone) and they traveled in style daily to St. Louis by private railway car, with stops in Detroit and Chicago so they could file stories about their visits. On their return to Toronto ten days later, the women discussed their professional exclusion from male journalists' gatherings and press clubs. Col. Ham, who traveled with them and was smoking his pipe nearby, quietly suggested they form their own press club, which they promptly did as presswomen were barred from joining the all-male Canadian Press Club.

Kit Coleman, a popular columnist and foreign correspondent for the Toronto Globe who had covered the war in Cuba, was chosen as the first president. The CWPC held its first convention in 1906 in Winnipeg, Manitoba. Col. Ham was made an honorary member. Until 1971, he was the only male member of CWPC. When Ham died in 1926 after 35 years as publicity agent for CPR, CWPC dedicated a plaque in his honour on the wall of Montreal's Windsor Station.

The early Winnipeg journalists, who would become core members of the CWPC, founded their Winnipeg Branch in 1907. Its members included: Cora Hind, agriculture editor of the Manitoba Free Press, who was known internationally for her accurate prediction of prairie wheat crop yields; writer sisters Francis and Lillian Beynon, who would later become central figures in Wendy Lill’s 1980s play Fighting Days; Kate Simpson Hayes, women’s editor at the Manitoba Free Press; and Nellie McClung, who would help lead the charge for the vote for women in Manitoba in 1916.

CWPC grew rapidly and over the years notable members, in addition to the above, included Lucy Maud Montgomery, Emmeline Pankhurst, Emily Murphy, Byrne Hope Sanders, Marshall Saunders, Miriam Green Ellis, Doris Anderson, and Charlotte Whitton. By its Golden Jubilee in 1954, the club had over 500 members with branches from Victoria to Halifax.

== Renaming in 1971 ==
In 1971, at a general meeting in Toronto, it was decided to change the club's name to Media Club of Canada, which made the name readily translatable into French, and opened the doors to male members. The club celebrated its 90th birthday in Halifax in 1994. The need for networking among young women journalists was no longer as great, however, and the club declined until it was finally unincorporated during their Centennial celebrations in 2004.

The Ottawa Media Club continues with a small membership.

== Notable members ==
=== Founding members ===
- Kathleen Blake Coleman of the Mail and Empire, Toronto
- "Francoise" Barry of La Journal de Francoise, Montreal
- Kate Simpson Hayes, 'Mary Markwell" of the Manitoba Free Press, Winnipeg
- Mary Adelaide Dawson of the Telegram, Toronto
- Irene Currie Love, of the Advertiser, London, Ontario
- Katherine Hughes, of the Bulletin, Edmonton
- Alice Asselin of La Nationalist, Montreal
- Margaret Graham of the Press, Ottawa
- A. Madeleine Gleason of La Patrie, Montreal
- Marie Beaupre of La Press, Montreal
- Grace E. Dension of Saturday Night
- "Peggy" Balmer Watt of the Sentinel Review, Woodstock
- A. (Amintha) Plouffe of Le Journal, Montreal

=== Other members ===
- Francis Beynon, editor of women’s pages of The Grain Growers’ Guide
- Lillian Beynon
- Cora Hind, agriculture editor of the Manitoba Free Press
- Lily Laverock, secretary and treasurer of the first Vancouver branch
- Nellie McClung
- Lucy Maud Montgomery
- Emmeline Pankhurst
- Emily Murphy
- Byrne Hope Sanders
- Marshall Saunders
- Miriam Green Ellis
- Doris Anderson
- Charlotte Whitton
