= Katherine Hughes (activist) =

Canadian journalist and author (1876–1925)

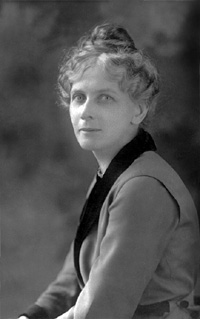
- Hughes, c. 1906
- Born: Katherine Angelina Hughes; November 12, 1876; Emerald Junction, Prince Edward Island, Canada
- Died: April 26, 1925 (aged 48); The Bronx, New York, US
- Other name: Caitlín Ní Aodha
- Occupations: Journalist; writer; political activist
- Known for: Serving as the first provincial archivist of Alberta; journalism of the 1904 St. Louis World's Fair; Irish activism
- Relatives: Cornelius O'Brien (uncle)

Katherine Angelina Hughes (November 12, 1876 – April 26, 1925) was a Canadian journalist, author, archivist, and political activist. She founded the Catholic Indian Association in 1901 and was the secretary of the Catholic Women's League of Canada. She was the first provincial archivist for Alberta. As a journalist, Hughes worked for The Montreal Daily Star and the Edmonton Bulletin.

Greatly affected by a visit to Ireland in 1914 and by the 1916 Easter Rising, she became active in the Irish War of Independence, and was tapped by Éamon de Valera to be the Canadian National Organizer for the Irish Self-Determination League. Hughes established branches of the Friends of Irish Freedom while touring the southern United States.

== Early life and education ==
Hughes was born on November 12, 1876, in Emerald, Prince Edward Island, to John Wellington Hughes, the owner of a livery yard and shop, and Annie Laurie O'Brien. Her family was Irish Catholic. She had four siblings: two brothers, P. A. Hughes and Mark Hughes, and two sisters, Mrs. Robert H. Kenll and Mrs. James O'Regan. Cornelius O'Brien, an uncle of Hughes', was the archbishop of Halifax from 1883 to 1906.

She received her education in Charlottetown, at the Notre Dame Convent and the Prince of Wales College, graduating in 1892 with a first-class teacher's licence.

== Career ==
=== Teaching ===
Little is known about Hughes' early career, but she is believed to have been a Catholic missionary in the late 19th century. She became a teacher at the Akwesasne Reserve in summer 1899. Hughes founded the Catholic Indian Association in 1901, an organization that sought to find employment for graduated students outside the reserve. Hughes was hired for her teaching position by the Department of Indian Affairs and had an annual salary of $300. She ended her position as a teacher at Akwesasne in 1902 to become a writer. She taught a class of 47 students, though absenteeism rates were high. According to Pádraig Ó Siadhail, Hughes was sympathetic to conditions faced by Indigenous peoples in Canada, but she had "a racialized view of Aboriginal Canadians as wards of the state and neither questioned nor challenged government policy as represented by the Indian Act or the long-term goal of assimilation. In fact, Hughes was a willing cog in the wheel of that assimilationist process."

=== Writing and journalism ===
Hughes declared that she planned to be a professional writer in 1902, after retiring from her teaching at Akwesasne. Hughes had stories published in Catholic World and the Prince Edward Island Magazine. She helped establish the Canadian Women's Press Club in 1904, serving as its vice-president from 1909. Hughes also became the recording secretary for the Canadian Women's Press Club. According to Kit Coleman, Hughes produced the best reportage of the organization's trip to Western Canada. She worked for The Montreal Daily Star from 1903 to 1906, covering the 1904 St. Louis World's Fair. In 1906, she switched to the Edmonton Bulletin, covering the Alberta Legislature for this paper.

In 1906, Hughes published her first book, which was a biography of her uncle entitled Archbishop O'Brien: Man and Churchman. The book was translated into various languages, and was favourably reviewed by The New York Times. In 1909, Hughes published her travels across Alberta's terrain as a memoir entitled In the Promised Land of Alberta's North. During her two-month trip, Hughes travelled thousands of kilometres. Her biography of Albert Lacombe, entitled Father Lacombe: The Black-Robe Voyageur, was published in 1911. The book was favourably reviewed by the New York Times Review of Books, one excerpt reading "[A] good biographer is 'rarer than hen's teeth', but Miss Hughes is one. Out of her book stands a figure as compelling as any in history. She has painted him as an artist ... She has literally written history like a novel."

Hughes contributed to The Life and Work of Sir William Van Horne, which was published under the name William Vaughan, who was a close family friend. According to Ó Siadhail, who analysed manuscripts of the work, Vaughan was more of an editor than the writer, as he relied heavily on Hughes' work. The heirs of William Van Horne had specified that Hughes not be credited as the author; Hughes believed this caveat was because of her political activism.

=== Alberta ===
In 1902, using stage coach, canoe, and boats, Hughes traveled alone through the Peace River and Athabasca districts of northern Alberta, acquiring artifacts for the Alberta archives. She became the first provincial archivist for Alberta in 1908, while residing in Edmonton. Shortly after leaving this position, she began working for Alberta Premier Alexander Rutherford, also working for his successor Arthur Sifton. As a provincial archivist, she earned an annual salary of $1,000. Hughes was also chosen by Sifton to be his principal secretary, but she never formally received the title. Hughes was the first woman in Canada to hold this position. As an archivist, Hughes collected oral history accounts from older adults about their experiences; she also sought textual and photographic materials.

Hughes participated in the Women's Canadian Club of Edmonton in the early 20th century.

She was the secretary of the Catholic Women's League of Canada. In 1912, Hughes founded the Catholic Women's League of Edmonton, which nationalized into the Catholic Women's League of Canada in 1920. It was modelled after the Catholic Women's League of England, which Hughes had inquired about while travelling in England. The organization welcomed new immigrants, ran an affordable hostel named Rosary Hall, offered a free job placement service, and acted as one of the first social services in Alberta.

=== Work for Irish independence ===
In 1913, Hughes moved to London, England, where she worked as secretary to John Reid, Alberta's first agent general, in his Charing Cross offices. Early in 1914 she travelled to Ireland then at the height of the Home Rule crisis. On her arrival in Dublin, she was considered a home-ruler supporting a devolved government for Ireland within the United Kingdom. She returned to London an advocate for Sinn Féin which, at the time, was calling fuller, if not complete, independence. Ó Siadhal believes that Hughes' views may already have begun to shift in London in the course of meetings with members of the Gaelic League and other Irish expatriate organizations, but that she was radicalized by her direct observation of Irish social and economic conditions. Hughes eventually adopted the Irish equivalent of her name: Caitlín Ní Aodha. She described her own ideological journey as being from "Canadian imperialist to Irish – a proper Irish person". Hughes believed that the British government would never be fair with Irish aspirations. Hughes likely met Pádraic Ó Conaire through the Gaelic League. Hughes and Ó Conaire collaborated on the 1915 play The Cherry Bird.

Hughes' principal task in London was recruitment of immigrants to Alberta; but, opposed to Canada's entry into the World War, she was thoroughly disaffected. By 1918, Hughes had lectured in every Canadian province and in several US states. Hughes wrote about her views in Ireland, an 85-page book that was published in 1917. In 1917, Hughes finally resigned her position in London. In 1918, she began working as a propagandist and orator for the Irish National Bureau in Washington, DC. Hughes established branches of the Friends of Irish Freedom while touring the southern US in 1919. She was chosen to be the Canadian National Organizer for the Irish Self-Determination League.

Hughes united two groups that had previously acted independently: the Self-Determination League of Canada and Newfound (SDIL) and the Irish Canadian National League (ICNL). The ICNL had advocated self-determination as promoted by United States president Woodrow Wilson for Ireland. Robert Lindsay Crawford, an Irish Protestant journalist who in Ulster had led an independent breakaway from the Orange Order, allied with Hughes for this task. In 1910, he reported for the Toronto Globe until he broke from the liberal-unionist editorial line after the Easter Rising. In October 1920, Crawford was named as the SDIL president at the league's Ottawa convention. In the SDIL, Hughes worked on secret, sensitive tasks; according to Australian historian Richard Davis, semi-secrecy of such tasks "had to be preserved to avoid deportation from countries like Australia and New Zealand". In 1918, Hughes was hired by the Irish Progressive League as a propagandist.

After organizing the Irish nationalist community within Canada, in late 1920, de Valera agreed that Hughes should travel to Australia to organize further branches of the Self-Determination for Ireland movement, as part of the broader global aspect of the Irish revolution. Thanks to Hughes' efforts, the new Self-Determination for Ireland League of Australia was established in February 1921. Hughes was also responsible for the formation of a similar organization in New Zealand, after Osmond Grattan Esmonde was detained at the outset of his mission. Following these two missions abroad, Hughes was the principal organizer of the Global Irish Race Conference in Paris in January 1922.

== Personal life ==
Hughes had relationships with various men, but she never married. One of her suitors was Paul von Aueberg, who was Protestant. Aueberg's letters to Hughes survived, and indicate that the couple discussed whether children should be raised in the faith of their mother or their father.

In her later years, Hughes lived in New York City. She died of cancer on April 26, 1925, at her sister's house in The Bronx, New York. Hughes was survived by her father, two brothers, and two sisters.

== Legacy ==
According to research produced by the staff of the Fort Edmonton Park, her work was initially "forgotten, or perhaps ignored", only being acknowledged long after her death. There are several possible explanations for why this might have happened: Hughes' multiple travels scattered her records, letters written by the founders of the Canadian Women's Press Club were lost, Miriam Green Ellis and other colleagues unintentionally or deliberately excluding her in their publications, twentieth-century scholars potentially being reluctant to acknowledge an anti-suffragist, and negative perceptions surrounding her Irish activism. Hughes' activism was also ignored by scholars writing about the history of Irish nationalism in Canada, and these omissions may have been prompted by her ideological views.

She is the only female Irish nationalist to have an entry in the Dictionary of Canadian Biography.

== Selected works ==
- Bush Light and Shade by K.H., 1895
- A New Year's Tale of the North, 1900
- Archbishop O'Brien, Man and Churchman, 1906
- In The Promised Land of Alberta's North, 1909
- Father Lacombe, the Blackrobe Voyageur ... Illustrated., 1911
- The Cherry Bird: A Comedy-Drama in Three Acts, 1915 (with Pádraic Ó Conaire)
- Ireland, Studies., 1917
- The Red Book of Ireland: A Compilation of Facts from Court and Press Records, 1920 (with James D. Phelan)
- The Life and Work of Sir William Van Horne, 1921 (with William Vaughan)
- Ireland, 1924

== See also ==
- Hanna Sheehy-Skeffington – an Irish nationalist who may have prompted Hughes to change her perspective on women's suffrage
