= Miriam Green Ellis =

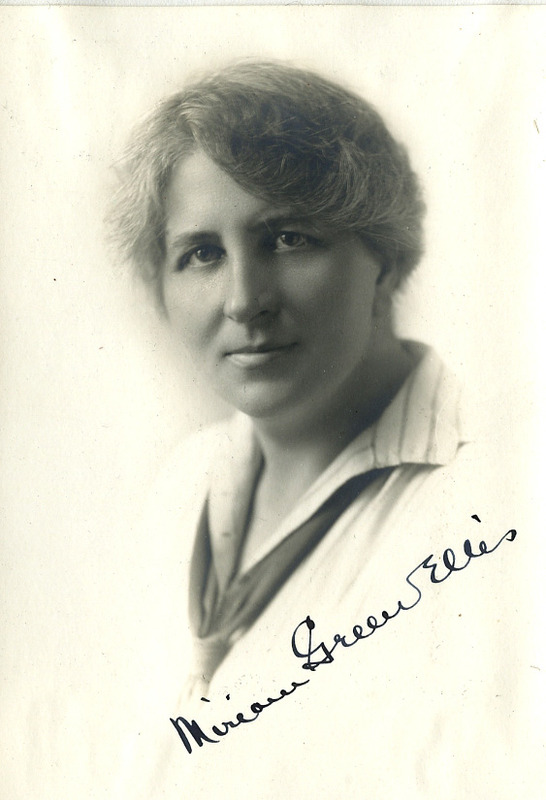
- A formal portrait of Miriam Green Ellis, with her signature.
- Born: Miriam Green; 1879; Richville, New York, U.S.
- Died: November 19, 1964 (aged 84–85); Winnipeg, Manitoba, Canada
- Education: Bishop Strachan School and Toronto Conservatory of Music
- Occupation: Agricultural Journalist
- Spouse: George Edward Ellis (separated)

Miriam Green Ellis (1879 – November 19, 1964) was an agricultural journalist best known for her 25-year career as western editor of the Family Herald and Weekly Star. Along with her mentor Cora Hind, she was a pioneering Western woman journalist at a time when the field was dominated by men. Her writing documented the early 20th century experience of the Canadian West, from country fairs to the impact of the Depression to the development of the oil sands.

== Early life ==
Miriam was born to Canadian parents in 1879 in Richville, New York. She spent most of her childhood in Athens, Ontario, attended high school in Toronto at Bishop Strachan School, and earned an A.T.C.M. (Associate of the Toronto Conservatory of Music) from the Toronto Conservatory of Music. When her family moved across the country to Edmonton in 1904, she met George Edward Ellis, an educator and bureaucrat. The couple married in 1905 when she was 25 and he was 31. They later moved to Prince Albert, Saskatchewan so George could take the role of principal at the Prince Albert Collegiate Institute. When World War I broke, George enlisted as a major in the 53rd Battalion (Northern Saskatchewan), CEF, but when he was "dismissed for misconduct," the couple separated and George relocated to Ontario.

== Career ==
For many years, Miriam worked as a freelance journalist, publishing in a handful of local Saskatchewan papers, like the Prince Albert Daily Herald and the Regina Leader-Post. In 1919, she moved to Edmonton to begin covering the Legislature as a reporter for the Edmonton Bulletin, a paper run by Edmonton businessman Frank Oliver (politician).

In 1920, Miriam organized the first regional conference for the Canadian Women's Press Club (CWPC), in Edmonton, attended by 50 women journalists. She had joined the CWPC in 1913 and served as president of the Edmonton branch in 1919. In subsequent years, she fulfilled roles as vice-president for Edmonton branch, area director for the Manitoba branch, and chair of the Beneficiary Fund and Memorial Awards board. At the organization's triennal in 1956, celebrated in Edmonton, Miriam delivered a talk summarizing the history of the CWPC. Her participation in the CWPC led to several key friendships in her life, including Emily Murphy and Nellie McClung.

Through her reporting at the Edmonton Bulletin, Miriam discovered that the Canadian North was an area of rapid development. In 1922, after her editor Frank Oliver refused to finance her idea, she undertook a self-funded trip to Aklavik in the Northwest Territories. Equipped with a typewriter and camera, she travelled mostly by river steamer up the Mackenzie River, documenting the life of the communities she encountered, including Cree, Dene, Gwich'in and Inuit. Places she visited and photographed included Waterways, Alberta, Fort McMurray, Fort McKay, Fort Chipewyan, Fort Smith, Fort Resolution, Hay River, Fort Providence, Fort Simpson, Fort Norman, Fort Good Hope, Fort McPherson, and, finally, Aklavik. The trip resulted in many striking photographs of life in the North. Miriam created a series of magic lantern slides using a calotype process to add colour, by hand, to her black and white photographs on glass slides. She toured to New York City and across Canada to share her images and recount her observations from her journey. Miriam also published 40 newspaper articles about her trip.

Following her Northern adventures, Miriam quit the Edmonton Bulletin to become a freelancer, and the Montreal-based Family Herald and Weekly Star published a lot of her work. When the paper offered her a position as western editor in 1927, she relocated to Winnipeg, serving 25 years in that role before her retirement in 1952. Covering agriculture in Western Canada, she developed a reputation as a knowledgeable and confident reporter.

To mark her retirement from the Family Herald and Weekly Star, 100 past colleagues and acquaintances from five provinces gathered in Winnipeg for a dinner to celebrate her legacy. Miriam continued freelancing until 1957.
