= Manitoba Political Equality League =

Political Equality League
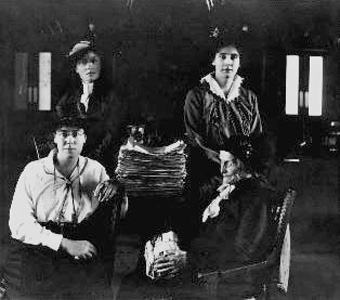
- Presentation of petition by the League in Winnipeg on 23 December 1915. Back: Mrs. A.N. Thomas, Mrs. F.J. Dixon. Front: Dr. Mary Crawford, Amelia Burritt
- Formation: 1912
- Dissolved: 1916
- Legal status: Defunct
- Purpose: Obtain women's suffrage
- Headquarters: Winnipeg, Manitoba
- Region served: Manitoba
- Official language: English

The Political Equality League was a group active in Manitoba, Canada between 1912 and 1916 that successfully lobbied for women's suffrage at the provincial level. One of the highlights of the campaign was a mock parliament in which Nellie McClung parodied the Conservative premier Rodmond Roblin, with a parliament of women dismissing men's claims for rights using the same arguments used by men to dismiss women's claims.

== Foundation ==
The Political Equality League was founded in March 1912 during a meeting at the Winnipeg home of Mrs. Jane Hample. The founders were progressive middle-class men and women, mostly well-educated professionals of Anglo-Saxon origin. Typically they believed in the Social Gospel. The main goal was to achieve the right of women to vote, but the league also was active in issues such as tariffs, labor law and prohibition of alcohol.

Members of the Winnipeg branch of the Canadian Women's Press Club formed the nucleus of the league and included Francis Marion Beynon, (Note: Francis Marion Beynon, sister of Lillian Beynon Thomas, edited the "Country Homemakers" page of the Grain Growers' Guide from 1912 to 1917. The paper was in favor of women's suffrage. Francis Beynon wanted the vote not just for Canadian and British women, or women with relatives serving in military, but for all women including recent immigrants.) Lillian Beynon Thomas, Nellie McClung and Ella Cora Hind. Lynn and Winona Flett also joined, as did men such as George Fisher Chipman (Note: George Fisher Chipman was editor-in-chief of the Grain Growers' Guide from 1911.) and Fred Dixon.

Dixon was elected secretary-treasurer, and his future wife Winona Flett was made superintendent of literature. Lillian Beynon Thomas was the first president, but Dr. Mary E. Crawford soon took over the leadership.

== Activities ==
Unlike organizations in Britain at the time, the league avoided violence and campaigned by distributing pamphlets, organizing petitions and staging peaceful demonstrations. Speakers such as Lillian Beynon Thomas and Nellie McClung gave talks on suffrage and maternal feminism (Note: "Maternal feminism" was a view held by many early feminists. They thought that women had distinctive maternal instincts and innate moral superiority, and therefore if given the vote would eliminate political, economic and social evils. Nellie McClung often used domestic metaphors, for example saying that women were needed to do a mighty piece of housekeeping in politics.) at theaters and halls across Manitoba, often encountering a hostile reception. According to McClung the government of Rodmond Roblin sent "stooges" to cause trouble at the meetings. In 1913 the league presented a petition signed by 20,000 men to Tobias Norris, leader of the Liberal Party. He agreed to support female suffrage.

=== Mock parliament ===
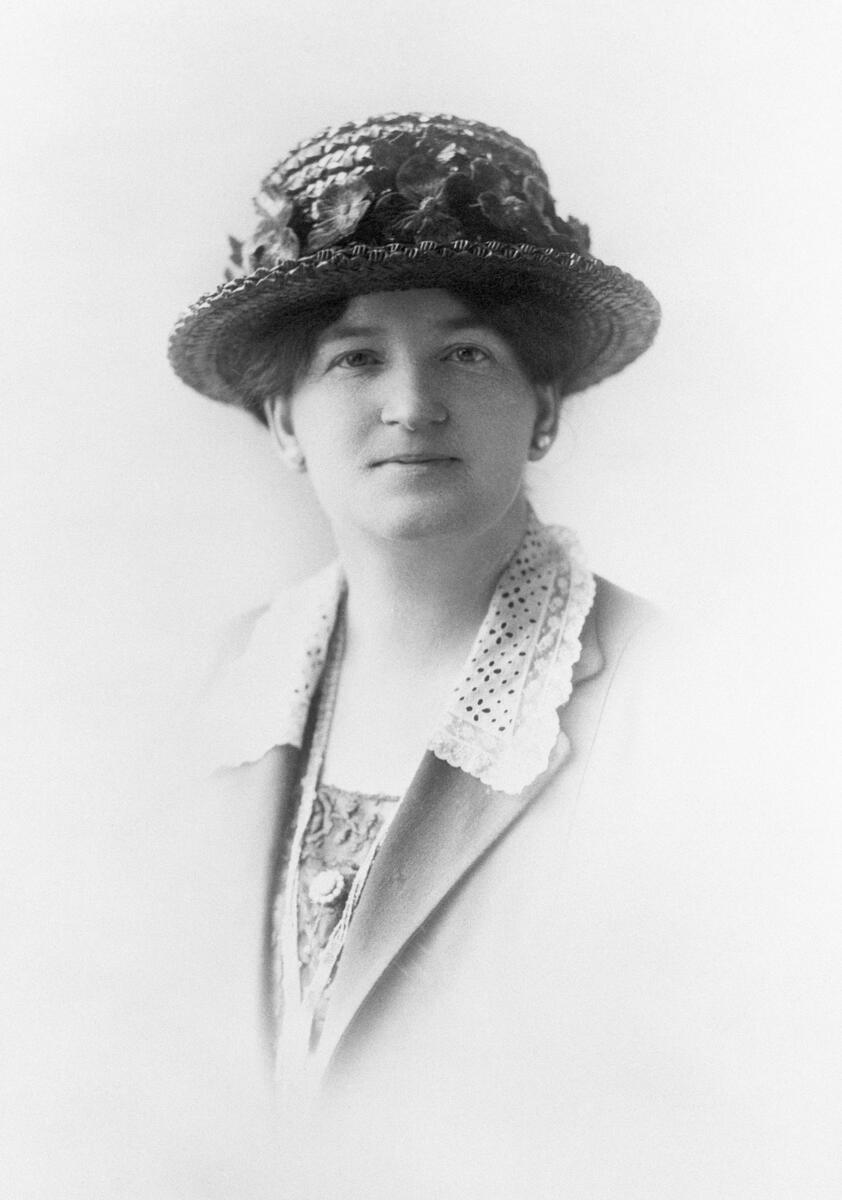
Nellie McClung

On 28 January 1914 the League presented a mock parliament at the Walker Theatre. Lillian Thomas wrote the satire, which starred Nellie McClung as premier of a province in which women were the political leaders and men led sheltered lives. McClung visited the provincial legislature with a delegation of reformers the day before the show. She called for women to have the vote so they could address evils such as alcoholism and prostitution, but was informed by Roblin that "nice women don't want the vote." McClung noted Roblin's gestures and way of speaking. (Note: Nellie McClung was to say after her meeting with Roblin, "I feel that when a man offers hat-lifting when we ask for justice we should tell him to keep his hat right on. I will go further and say that we should tell him not only to keep his hat on but to pull it right down over his face.) She used her observations with wicked effect the next evening when playing the premier of a legislature composed of women. After the women had dealt with issues such as suitable male clothing and labor saving devices for men, and had dismissed dower rights for men, a delegation of men arrived with a wheelbarrow full of petitions for the right to vote. McClung (a tiny woman) brought the house down as she parodied the domineering premier Rodmond, rocking on her heels, twiddling her fingers and loudly proclaiming,

We wish to compliment this delegation on their splendid, gentle, manly appearance. If, without exercising the vote, such specimens of manhood can be produced, such a system of affairs should not be interfered with ... Politics unsettles men, and unsettled men means unsettled bills, broken furniture, broken vows, and divorce ... The modesty of our men, which we reverence, forbids us giving them the vote. Man’s place is on the farm ... Good men shrink from the vote as from a pestilence ...

The mock parliament was a great success, and was followed by repeat performances. Earnings from the play financed the suffrage campaign that followed. The Winnipeg Telegram described the first performance, to a packed house,

From the standpoint of an entertainment, it was excellent and few burlesques or light comedy productions have ever met with a heartier response than last night's burlesque on the system of government as it exists today. The performers may have been amateurs, but they were only amateur in name. As a matter of fact they were the real thing so far as woman suffrage is concerned so they were naturally quite at home in their roles, even if they were a wee bit nervous at first. But the spirit of the thing seemed to catch them all and consequently the performance was an entire success, from both the point of view of artists and the audience. The women who portrayed the characters of politicians both in and out of office appeared to take quite naturally to their parts; in fact, it might be said that they actually revelled in the pretence of holding office and that secret ambition they all shared is undoubtedly accountable for the great success of the entire program.

=== Provincial elections ===
In the lead-up to the 1914 provincial elections the League campaigned for Dixon as an independent and for the Liberals, using political meetings to make the suffrage argument that "all sane adult persons [must] have equal voice in the making of laws which they have equally to obey." Nellie McClung and Lillian Thomas spoke at the Liberal convention, the first time in Canada women had spoken at such an important political event. During the election campaign Tobias Norris proclaimed:

If I am given the chance I will demonstrate that I can keep my word. There is a great wave of public opinion passing over the United States and Canada demanding that politicians keep their promises. (loud cheers) If I am given a chance I will show to the people of Manitoba that a Manitoba politician can keep his promises too. (loud cheers) I believe that posterity will look back upon this convention as the beginning of the downfall of a dishonest administration, and as the beginning of the building up of a higher citizenship in this province. (loud and prolonged cheers)

Despite the league's efforts, the Conservatives won the election of July 1914. However, on 12 May 1915 Roblin and his entire cabinet were forced to resign due to a corruption scandal. In the subsequent provincial election of 6 August 1915 the Liberals under Norris won by a landslide.

In August Norris said he would introduce legislation on women's suffrage if he received a petition with at least 20,000 signatures. In December a delegation of sixteen men and women formally presented two petitions to Norris with more than 40,000 names in total. The 93-year-old Amelia Burritt was one of the most active in getting signatures, reaping 4,000 in a door-to-door campaign in Winnipeg. The first draft of the bill excluded women from election to the legislature. When the league noticed this, they threatened to raise the omission with the Manitoba Grain Growers' Association, which was holding its convention. The government hastily revised the draft to allow women to sit in the house. The act giving full provincial suffrage to women passed in January 1916, making Manitoba the first province in Canada to give women full political rights. The league was no longer active after 1916, but during its short existence had made a fundamental impact on politics in Manitoba.

== Sources ==
- "Beynon, Francis Marion". Simon Fraser University Library.
- Fitzgerald, Judith; Labrèche-Larouche, Michelle; Braid, Kate; et al. (2013-12-24). Quest Biography 35-Book Bundle: Marshall McLuhan, Nellie McClung, René Lévesque and many more. Dundurn. ISBN 978-1-4597-2834-9.
- Freeman, Barbara M. (2011-12-14). Beyond Bylines: Media Workers and Women's Rights in Canada. Wilfrid Laurier Univ. Press. ISBN 978-1-55458-313-3.
- Hathaway, Debbie (1982). "The Political Equality League of Manitoba". Manitoba History. 3. Manitoba Historical Society.
- Herk, Aritha Van (2010-01-12). Mavericks. Penguin Group (Canada). ISBN 978-0-14-317695-4.
- Holmlund, Mona; Youngberg, Gail (2003). Inspiring Women: A Celebration of Herstory. Coteau Books. ISBN 978-1-55050-204-6.
- Howard, Irene (2011-11-01). The Struggle for Social Justice in British Columbia: Helena Gutteridge, the Unknown Reformer. UBC Press. ISBN 978-0-7748-4287-7.
- Lewis, Norah L. (1998-04-28). Dear Editor and Friends: Letters from Rural Women of the North-West, 1900-1920. Wilfrid Laurier Univ. Press. ISBN 978-0-88920-287-0.
- Orlikow, Lionel (1960). "The Reform Movement in Manitoba, 1910-1915". MHS Transactions. Series 3: 1959-60 season.
- "Political Equality League". Manitoba Historical Society.
- "Report on the Political Equality League's Mock Parliament". Winnipeg Telegram. 1914-01-28.
- "The Political Equality League; Nellie McClung". Teacherweb. Archived from the original on 2014-10-23.
