= Francis Marion Beynon =

Canadian journalist, feminist, and pacifist (1884–1951)

- Born: 26 May 1884; Streetsville, Ontario, Canada
- Died: 5 October 1951 (aged 67); Winnipeg, Manitoba, Canada
- Occupation: Journalist
- Known for: Aleta Day; advocacy for women's suffrage in Manitoba

Francis Marion Beynon (26 May 1884 – 5 October 1951) was a Canadian journalist, feminist and pacifist. As the influential editor of the women's pages of the Grain Growers' Guide, she became a prominent voice in the Manitoba women's movement, using the paper to campaign for political equality, women's property rights, and social reform. Her outspoken pacifism during the First World War made her one of the most controversial figures in prairie journalism and ultimately cost her her position in 1917. She is known for her semi-autobiographical novel Aleta Day (1919) which explored the social and political tensions of her era.

== Early years ==
Francis Marion Beynon was born in Streetsville, Ontario on 26 May 1884. Her parents, James Barnes Benyon (1835–1907) and Rebecca (Manning) Beynon (1847–98), married in 1872. Both parents were teetotallers and convinced Methodists, a faith she would later reject. Her sister was author Lillian Beynon Thomas (1874–1961). Her family moved to Manitoba in 1889 when she was a child and took up farming in the Hartney district. She earned a teaching certificate and taught near Carman for some time.

== Activist ==
Around 1909 Beynon and her sister moved to Winnipeg, where Francis found work in the advertising department of the T. Eaton Company, a department store. Both sisters were active in fighting for women's suffrage, changes to dower legislation and the right of women to homestead.

From 1912 to 1917 Beynon edited the women's page ("The Country Homemaker's Page" and "The Sunshine Guild") of the Grain Growers' Guide. She also was responsible for the children's pages under the pseudonym "Dixie Patton" and wrote an anonymous column, "Country Girl's Ideas." She used the women's pages to discuss women's suffrage, women's work, marriage and the family.

Beynon and her sister helped found the Quill Club and the Winnipeg branch of the Canadian Women's Press Club. She was one of the organizers of the Manitoba Political Equality League, which led the struggle in Manitoba for women's suffrage. Beynon was a social feminist. She accepted that women should be responsible for care of the home and of children, but felt this should not preclude them from education, property rights and discussion of political issues. She felt that women should stand on their own feet, and that husband and wife should share responsibility and success.

During World War I (1914–18) Beynon supported giving all immigrants the right to vote, opposed conscription without a plebiscite, and believed these issues should be freely discussed in public. In 1917, her pacifism resulted in her being forced to resign her position with the Grain Growers' Guide. She, her sister Lillian, Nellie McClung and Ella Cora Hind helped bring about the defeat of Rodmond Roblin's Manitoba government in 1915, and helped ensure that his successor Tobias Norris gave full suffrage to women in provincial elections from 1916.

== Later years ==
In late June 1917, Beynon left Winnipeg and moved to New York City. Some sources say her views caused conflicts with George Fisher Chipman, the editor of the paper, and she resigned for this reason. However, Chipman gave Beynon considerable freedom and continued to publish her articles for several weeks after she left. Beynon spent most of the rest of her life in the United States. In 1919 she published Aleta Day, a semi-autobiographical novel.

Beynon lived in Providence, Rhode Island for a period, then in New York from 1922 to 1951. In New York Benyon and her sister worked at the Seamen's Church Institute, an Episcopalian Mission for sailors. From 1922 to 1925 she edited the mission's journal The Lookout. She remained in New York for most of the next twenty-five years, possibly writing as a freelancer under the name of "Ginty Beynon." For a brief period, she worked in Rhode Island as a clerk for a trust company.

Beynon returned to Canada in 1951 and died in Winnipeg on 5 October 1951. She was buried in Brookside Cemetery.

Beynon and Nellie McClung are protagonists in the play The Fighting Days by Wendy Lill.

== Publications ==
- Beynon, Francis Marion (2000-10-18) [First published 1919]. Aleta Dey. Broadview Press. ISBN 978-1-55111-391-3.

== Sources ==
- "Beynon, Francis Marion". Simon Fraser University Library.
- Freeman, Barbara M. (2011-12-14). Beyond Bylines: Media Workers and Women's Rights in Canada. Wilfrid Laurier Univ. Press. ISBN 978-1-55458-313-3.
- Goldsborough, Gordon (2010-12-31). "Frances Marion Beynon (1884-1951)". Manitoba Historical Society.
- Gorham, Deborah (2008-03-24). "Francis Marion Beynon". The Canadian Encyclopedia. Historica Canada.
- Johnstone, Tiffany (2013-05-14). "Sister Suffragists: Lillian Beynon Thomas (1874-1961) and Francis Marion Beynon (1884-1951)".
- Kaye, Frances W. (2011). Goodlands: A Meditation and History on the Great Plains. Athabasca University Press. ISBN 978-1-897425-98-5.
- Kelcey, Barbara E.; Davis, Angela E. (1997). A Great Movement Underway: Women and The Grain Growers' Guide (1908-1928) (PDF). Winnipeg: Manitoba Record Society. ISBN 9780969210153.
- Lewis, Norah L. (1998-04-28). Dear Editor and Friends: Letters from Rural Women of the North-West, 1900-1920. Wilfrid Laurier Univ. Press. ISBN 978-0-88920-287-0.
