= Pádraig Ó Siadhail =

Canadian academic (born 1957)

Pádraig Ó Siadhail was born in Derry, Northern Ireland, in 1957, and now lives in Halifax, Nova Scotia, Canada. He is a scholar and writer.

Ó Siadhail completed a PhD at Trinity College Dublin in 1985. He is an emeritus professor at Saint Mary's University, Nova Scotia, where he specialises in Celtic studies. He lives in Halifax. He is a past president of the Canadian Association for Irish Studies.

== Selected publications ==
Among Ó Siadhail's works are the murder mystery Peaca an tSinsir (1996), a collection of short stories under the title Seacht gCineál Meisce agus Finscéalta Eile (2001), a historical novel entitled Beirt Bhan Mhisniúla (2011), a biography of Piaras Béaslaí, Irish nationalist and writer, and a collection of essays about Canada, Idir Dhá Thír: Sceitsí ó Cheanada (2005). He has also published a biography of Katherine Hughes (1876–1925), a Canadian-born Irish Republican activist and propagandist and her work during the Irish War of Independence.

=== List of published works ===
- Katherine Hughes. A Life and a Journey. Newcastle, Ontario: Penumbra Press 2014.
- Beirt Bhan Mhisniúla. Indreabhan: Cló Iar-Chonnacht 2011.
- An Béaslaíoch: Beatha agus Saothar Phiarais Béaslaí, 1881-1965. Dublin: Coiscéim 2007.
- Idir Dhá Thír: Sceitsí ó Cheanada. Belfast: Lagan Press 2005.
- Na Seacht gCineál Meisce agus Finscéalta Eile. Indreabhán, Galway: Cló Iar-Chonnacht 2001.
- Peaca an tSinsir. Indreabhan: Cló Iar-Chonnacht 1996.
- Éagnairc. Indreabhán: Cló Iar-Chonnacht 1994.
- Stair Dhrámaíocht na Gaeilge, 1900-1970. Indreabhán, Galway: Cló Iar-Chonnacht 1993.
- Parthas na gCleas. Indreabhán: Cló Iar-Chonnacht 1991.

== Selected articles ==
- "James Mooney: The 'Indian Man,' and the 'Irish Catholic.'" In Graeme Morton and David A. Wilson (eds.), Irish and Scottish Encounters with Indigenous Peoples. Canada, the United States, New Zealand, and Australia. Montreal & Kingston: McGill Queen's University Press, 2013, 49–70.
- "‘Anna Ghordún’ agus an ‘Gaberlunzie Man.’ Nóta faisnéise faoi Anne Gordon Rudmose-Brown agus faoi Phádraic Ó Conaire," in Eoin Mac Cárthaigh & Jürgen Uhlich (eds.), Féilscríbhinn do Chathal Ó Háinle. Indreabhán: An Clóchomhar/Cló Iar-Chonnacht, 2012, 915-933.
- "Odd Man Out: Micheál Ó Conghaile and Contemporary Irish language Queer Prose," Canadian Journal of Irish Studies, Vol. 36, No. 1, Spring 2010, 143–161.
- "James Mooney, ‘The Indian Man’, agus Béaloideas na hÉireann," Béaloideas, Vol./Iml. 77, 2009, 1-36.
- "Bunú an Fháinne agus Éirí Amach na Cásca 1916," Taighde agus Teagasc, Imleabhar 6 (2008), 174–193.
