= Women's page =

Newspaper section

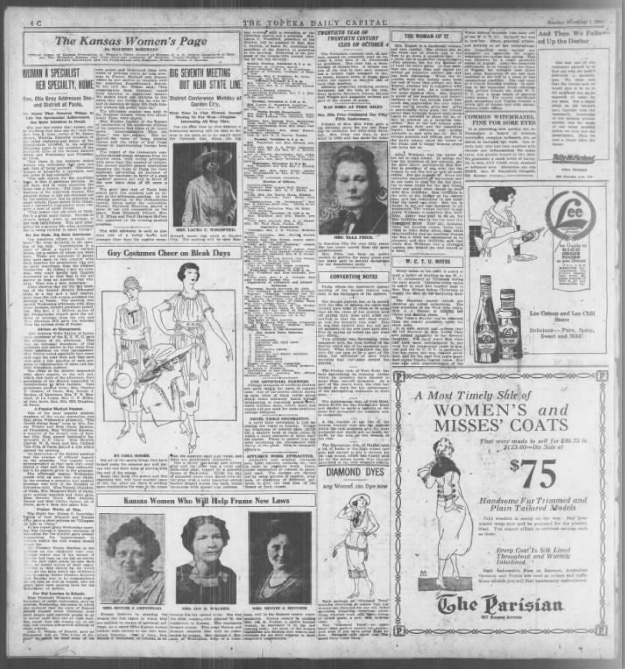
"The Kansas Women's Page" section of the Topeka Daily Capital in 1920

The women's page (sometimes called home page or women's section) of a newspaper was a section devoted to covering news assumed to be of interest to women. Women's pages started out in the 19th century as society pages and eventually morphed into features sections in the 1970s. Although denigrated during much of that period, they had a significant impact on journalism and in their communities.

== History ==
=== Early women's pages ===
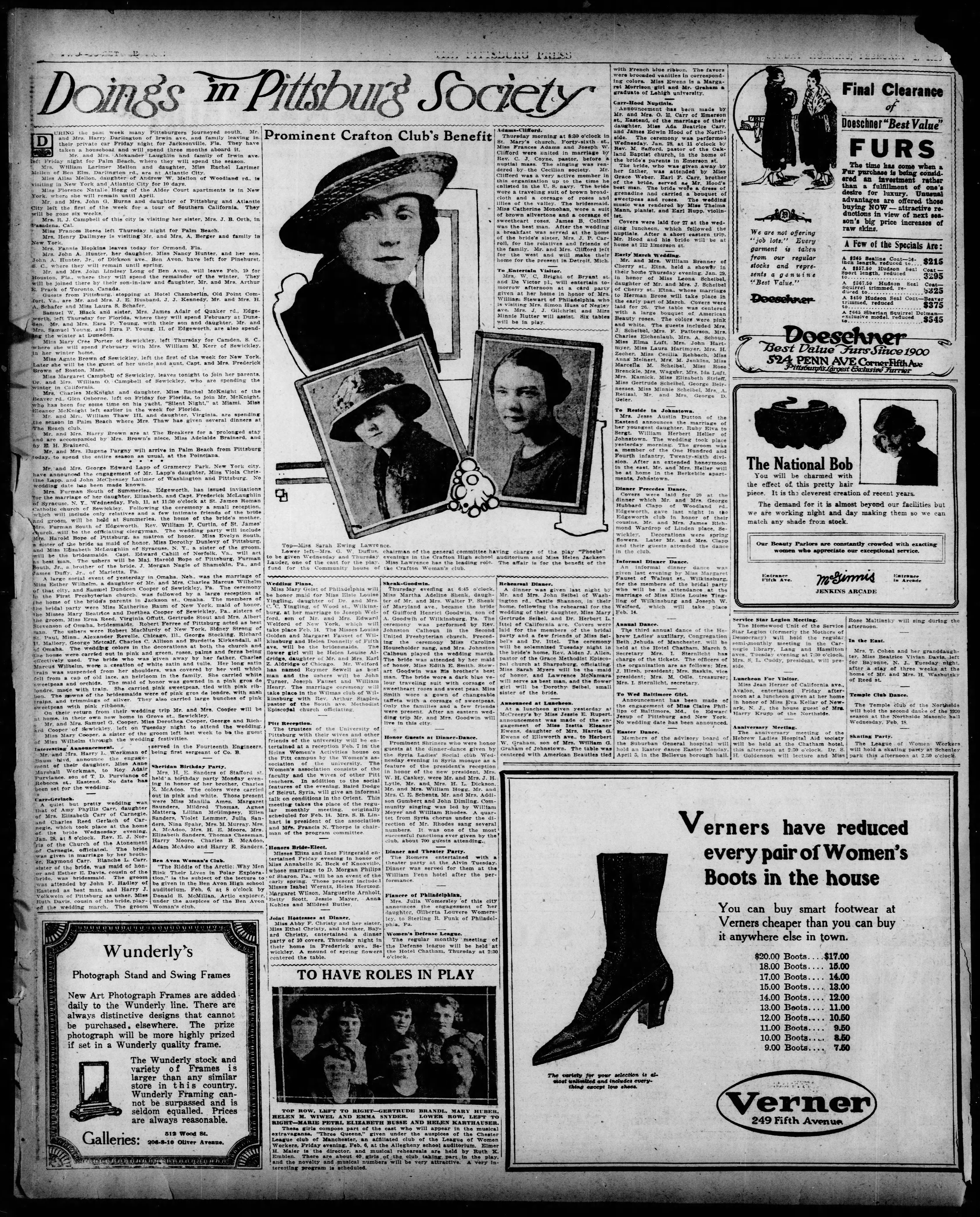
"Doings in Pittsburg Society," the society page of The Pittsburg Press, on February 1, 1920

In 1835 New York Herald publisher James Gordon Bennett Jr., created the first newspaper society page. In the century's final two decades, a "motley assemblage" of stories presumed to be of interest to women began to be gathered together into a single section of newspapers in Britain, Canada, and the US.

In the 1880s and 1890s, newspaper publishers such as Joseph Pulitzer started developing sections of their papers to attract women readers, who were of interest to advertisers. Industrialization had profoundly increased the number of branded consumer products, and advertisers recognized that women were the primary purchasing decision makers for their households. Advertising within women's sections focussed on department stores. Proprietors of newspapers competed for women readers, who both boosted subscription sales but were of great interest to advertisers, who recognized that women were important decisionmakers for family purchases. News historian Gerald Baldasty put it that, "For the newspaper industry, a woman's charm was purely financial."

Sections focused on the "Four F's" – family, food, furnishings, and fashion – and on society news and advice and recipe columns. Most women covered by the sections were wives, daughters, or brides of prominent men. Newspapers typically hired women to staff these sections.

The popularization of women's pages coincided with the first wave of feminism. Media scholar Dustin Harp said she found no evidence that women of the time viewed these sections otherwise than positively, as they offered a rare opportunity for expression, but also surmised that feminists may have viewed them with mixed reactions as the sections also reinforced stereotypes.

By 1886 the New York World carried columns aimed at women. By 1891 the Sunday issues featured a page of fashion and society coverage. By 1894 the daily issues featured a page headlined "For and About Women."

By 1900, many metropolitan newspapers had a women's section covering society and fashion.

By 1920 women's page journalism, sometimes called "home page journalism" was being taught in colleges. As late as 1949 women's page journalism classes at Columbia University included instruction that news of "crises, disaster, tragedies" belonged on the front pages while the inside pages were "like the inside of a home" and that women journalists should contribute by focussing on wholesome, uplifting topics in the women's sections. According to media scholar Jan Whitt, the implication was that only male journalists understood and could write about hard news.

In addition to being prevented from working in other departments, women journalists working in the women's section were often denigrated by male journalists. Their working spaces were given names such as the "hen coop." For decades, the majority of women journalists worked in women's sections.

=== World War II ===
As in many fields, journalism opportunities for US women changed dramatically during World War II. Many men left their jobs to go to war, and women were tapped to perform those jobs, which before the war had only been open to men. Many women were required to sign waivers agreeing to leave these jobs when the war ended, but during the war women journalists developed their skills and interests to include coverage of hard news, and they returned to their former positions with that new knowledge. Many, like Dorothy Jurney, were asked to train their male replacements before being relegated back to the women's section. Jurney was told by the managing editor that she was not a candidate for city editor because she was a woman.

=== Post World War II ===
In the years after World War II, many women's page journalists and editors, many of whom had covered hard news during the war, attempted to change the focus of women's sections to cover substantive, important news of interest to women. Media scholar Kimberly Wilmot Voss said of this period that women's sections "came into their own." Sections became larger and covered increasingly progressive content, but "the perceptions that the sections were fluff continued for years."

Post-1960, the trend continued and some newspapers' sections were covering stories that weren't being covered in news sections, such as exposés of county foster homes, stories about domestic abuse, reproductive rights, and other substantive topics. Marie Anderson of the Miami Herald led her section to discontinue society coverage. Under her leadership the section won so many Penney-Missouri Awards (see below) in the 1960s that the paper was asked to retire from the competition. These trends were pioneered by smaller metropolitan newspapers such as the Herald, the Dallas Times-Herald, and the Detroit Free Press. Many major US papers were slow to follow, including the New York Times, whose women's section was named "Food, Fashion, Furnishings, and Family" until 1971.

=== J. C. Penney-Missouri Awards ===
In the US, the J. C. Penney-Missouri Awards (often called the Penney-Missouri Awards and later the Missouri Lifestyle Journalism Awards) were the most prestigious awards for women's page writing and editing and the only nationwide recognition specifically for women's page journalism. The awards were inaugurated in 1960 to recognize women's sections with progressive content that covered stories other than society, club, and fashion news. They were often described as the Pulitzers of women's page journalism at a time when most women's page coverage wasn't considered for other prestigious journalism awards.

The awards presentations each year were accompanied by influential workshops that encouraged women's page editors to focus on more substantive, progressive issues. 1966 keynote speaker Marjorie Paxson told attendees, "It's time we started putting some hard news into (our pages.) It's time we accepted the responsibility of making our readers aware." Because women were not at the time accepted into the Society of Professional Journalists, these workshops represented an important networking opportunity that wasn't otherwise available to women journalists.

Rodger Streitmatter, writing in the scholarly journal Journalism History, credits the awards for helping to change women's pages journalism from the traditional types of coverage to covering more substantive stories.

=== Women's movement ===
The second wave of feminism in the 1960s and 1970s coincided with newspapers' movements to replace women's pages with features and lifestyles sections. While women's page editors were pushing their management to allow them to cover issues of importance to women, many feminists were criticizing the very idea of "women's" news, arguing that news important to women was news that should be covered in the main section of the newspaper and that segregating women's news to within one section marginalized that news and implicitly indicated the rest of the newspaper was for men. They believed so-called "women's sections" should be eliminated.

Many women's page editors considered themselves part of or supporters of the women's movement and were proud of their role in covering topics important to women readers. In many newspapers the only coverage of the women's movement was within the women's section. The 1965 announcement of the formation of the National Organization for Women ran between an article about Saks Fifth Avenue and a recipe for turkey stuffing.

Women's pages of the time were accused of talking down to women. A 1971 Glamour editorial asked, "What has your women's page editor done for you lately?" and said the sections reduced women to traditional roles.

In 1978, sociologist Cynthia Fuchs Epstein argued that news of the women's movement did not belong in the women's section because "just by appearing there, the stories maintain the status quo, for they tell both men and women that news of the women's movement is not of general concern." That same year Harvey Molotch wrote that news was "essentially men talking to men. The women's pages are a deliberate exception: Here it is the case that women who work for men talk to women. But in terms of the important information...women are not ordinarily present."

According to media scholar Voss, the argument that if women's pages were eliminated, news of importance to women would end up on the front pages turned out to be incorrect, and that instead much of it simply did not appear in the newspapers after the elimination of the women's section.

As late as 1993 media scholar M. Junior Bridge found that the incidence of references to women on the front page of the New York Times had only risen to 13% of names mentioned, up from 5% in 1989. Times executive editor Max Frankel reacted to the announcement of this study by suggesting more women would appear on the front page if the front page were "covering local teas."

=== Features sections ===
In 1969, The Washington Post under the leadership of Ben Bradlee replaced the women's page, "For and About Women," with a section called "Style," which was designed to attract a broader audience. The Los Angeles Times followed suit with "View" the next year and soon metropolitan newspapers throughout the US stopped publishing explicitly-named women's sections in favor of "lifestyle" sections. According to Harp, this represented the "birth of the modern-day feature section." Society news all but disappeared from these sections, and wedding announcements and club news became minor segments of most newspapers.

In many cases the editors who had been managing the women's sections were demoted and male editors installed to manage the new features sections. This happened twice to Paxson, when two different newspapers eliminated their women's sections, which she had been editing, demoted her, and hired a man as features editor.

=== Resumption of women's sections ===
In the late 1980s, some newspapers reintroduced sections explicitly designed to attract female readers. The Chicago Tribune called their section "WomanNews." As late as 2006 the section was being included within the "Tempo" features section on Wednesdays.

== Impact ==
Women's sections, while marginalized by other journalists and by members of the women's movement, made major contributions in their communities. Working with local women's clubs – another group often denigrated – some women's sections pinpointed community problems and helped develop solutions. Women's sections in some metropolitan areas were instrumental in establishing social programs and libraries. In a 1960s-era speech, Marie Anderson told women's page journalists, "be a motivating source in your community. If your town doesn't do something, call attention to it." Club editors in many metropolitan areas held workshops to train local club leaders how to create and describe projects that would make their work newsworthy. The journalists encouraged the clubwomen first to tackle newsworthy work, and then to write press releases useful in the selection and development of stories. This work encouraged women's clubs to upgrade their programming, resulting in meaningful work being done by women's clubs which had formerly been primarily social groups.

Some women's page editors developed inclusive policies, often before the other sections of the newspaper. The Miami Herald ran a series profiling black residents in 1962, "well before the front pages of the newspaper addressed societal inequities." Edee Greene of the Fort Lauderdale News rans photos of black brides before it was done at most newspapers. In 1968 Ebony editor Ponchitta Pierce was invited by Theta Sigma Phi to write a piece for the professional association's publication Matrix on including black women in women's pages.

By the 1960s, many metropolitan women's pages were covering social issues, which weren't typically being covered in news sections. Women's pages in some newspapers covered domestic violence, the Equal Rights Amendment, abortion, syphilis, women's prison, prostitution, child molestation, and other issues before their papers' news sections did.

Media scholar Julie Golia concluded that women's page journalism has been "dismissed by contemporaries and scholars as homogenouse drivel" and "long been misunderstood because no one has conducted an in-depth multi-decade analysis of content and evolution.

Voss concluded they helped change the newspaper industry.

== Notable journalists ==
=== Reporters, photographers, and columnists ===
==== Australia ====
- Agnes Goode
- Harriet Hooton
- Ethel Knight Kelly
- Antoinette Kensel Thurgood

==== Bangladesh ====
- Iffat Ara

==== Canada ====
- Gladys Arnold
- Francis Marion Beynon
- Sarah Anne Curzon
- Joan Fraser
- Elizabeth Smart
- Jane Jacobs
- Ethel Knight Kelly
- Florence Randal Livesay
- Harriet Dunlop Prenter
- Savella Stechishin

==== Chile ====
- Sara Hübner de Fresno

==== Cuba ====
- María Collado Romero

==== England ====
- Ruth Adam
- Frances Cairncross
- Judith Cook, founded an anti-nuclear organization via columns in the women's pages
- Frederick Cunliffe-Owen
- Sarah Anne Curzon
- Liz Forgan
- Winifred Fortescue
- Patience Gray
- Nora Heald
- Jeannie Mole
- Constance Peel
- Susanne Puddefoot
- Jean Stead
- Dawn Langley Simmons
- Evelyn Sharp
- Mary Stott
- Jill Tweedie

==== Ethiopia ====
- Sophia Yilma

==== France ====
- Germaine Degrond
- Hélène Gordon-Lazareff

==== Ireland ====
- Maeve Binchy
- Mary E.L. Butler
- Louisa Watson Peat

==== New Zealand ====
- Eileen Duggan
- Esther Glen
- Kate Isitt
- Alice Woodhouse

==== Nigeria ====
- Adaora Lily Ulasi

==== Palestine ====
- Asma Tubi

==== Philippines ====
- Eugenia Apostol

==== Poland ====
- Dina Blond

==== Scotland ====
- Dorothy-Grace Elder
- Evelyn Irons

==== Sri Lanka ====
- Vijita Fernando

==== Ukraine ====
- Savella Stechishin

==== United States ====
- Emilie Frances Bauer
- Nikki Beare
- Marion Howard Brazier
- Nell Brinkley
- Caro Crawford Brown
- Louise Bryant
- Fanny Butcher
- Vivian Castleberry
- Craig Claiborne, food critic whose columns first appeared in the New York Times' women's pages
- Charlotte Reeve Conover
- Dorothy Dix
- Robin Chandler Duke
- India Edwards
- George Elliston
- Gloria Emerson
- Martha R. Field
- Doris Fleischman
- Mary Nogueras Frampton, Los Angeles Times
- Mary Garber
- Charlotte Giesen
- Anna Roosevelt Halsted
- Marguerite Harrison
- Marj Heyduck
- Primrose Rupp Hinton
- Ruth Langdon Inglis
- Jane Jacobs
- Selma James
- Elizabeth Jordan
- Sophie Kerr
- Gerri Major
- Marie Manning, created the first advice column
- Louise Markscheffel
- Marguerite Martyn, reporter and artist, St. Louis Post-Dispatch
- Mary Margaret McBride
- Miriam Michelson
- Maury Henry Biddle Paul, coined the term Café Society
- Louisa Watson Peat
- Pearl Rivers
- Jane Roberts
- Martha Root
- Gail Sheehy
- Rebecca Stiles Taylor
- Lillian Beynon Thomas
- Antoinette Kensel Thurgood
- Nina Totenberg
- Ralph Waldo Tyler
- Ina Eloise Young

=== Influential editors ===
- Marie Anderson
- Eugenia Apostol
- Eileen Ascroft
- Ben Bradlee
- Ernestine Carter
- Vivian Castleberry
- Nancy Dexter
- Colleen Dishon
- Prudence Glynn
- Dorothy Jurney, the "godmother of women's pages."
- Marjorie Paxson

== See also ==
- Women in journalism
