= Archibald Museum =

Coordinates: 49.2392°N 98.5335°W

The Archibald Historical Museum was a museum located in Manitou, Manitoba. It was founded as an archive of books and photographs from the area. The museum was surrounded by several historical buildings that have been relocated and restored. The museum was founded by the William Wallcraft. The museum was located two miles east of La Riviere and four miles north off No. 3 highway, in the Rural Municipality of Pembina.

Two of the buildings are particularly significant as Nellie McClung, a Canadian feminist, resided in them.

The museum closed in 2016. The buildings associated with Nellie McClung were moved to Manitou, Manitoba in 2017.
