= Antoinette Kensel Thurgood =

American philanthropist and editor (1842–1915)

- Born: Antoinette Kensel c. 1842; Lexington, Kentucky
- Died: 31 March 1915 (aged 73); Unley, South Australia
- Education: Sayre School
- Occupations: Editor; Philanthropist; Community Organiser
- Employers: Australian Christian Magazine; White Ribbon Signal Magazine
- Movement: Temperance
- Board member of: Bethesda Home; Women's Conference of the Associated Churches of Christ; Christian Women's Board of Missions; Union Missionary Societies of Allegheny County
- Spouse: Charles Lloyd Thurgood (m. 1882; died 1911)

Antoinette Kensel Thurgood (born Antoinette Kensel, c. 1842 – March 31, 1915) was an American philanthropist, Christian women's community organizer, and newspaper editor. She was the founder of the Women's Conference of the Churches of Christ in Victoria, Australia.

== Biography ==
=== Early life ===
Born in Lexington, Kentucky, Thurgood was the daughter of Christian Kensel and Mary Ann (Butt) Kensel. She was educated at Sayre Institute (now Sayre School) in Lexington.

She married an Australian pastor, Charles Lloyd Thurgood, at Lexington on June 13, 1882.

=== Career ===
Thurgood and her husband travelled from Kentucky to Australia in 1882, via Europe, Egypt, and Ceylon. Charles had accepted a position of pastor of Ballarat and Geelong Churches of Christ.

Thurgood was the organizer of the first Christian Endeavor Society in Australasia at Geelong, Victoria, February 1883. She was the founder of the Women's Conference of the Churches of Christ, also in Victoria. She was also the honorary president of the Women's Conference of the Associated Churches of Christ, Victoria. Australia.

Thurgood served as associate editor of the White Ribbon Signal, Woman's Christian Temperance Union of Victoria, in Australia; and editor of the women's page of the Australian Christian in Melbourne.

In April 1891 Thurgood and her husband returned to the United States. Thurgood served as a member of the Board of the Union Missionary Societies of Allegheny County, as representative of the Christian Church, 1907–1908; a member of the Board of Managers of the Bethesda Home, Pittsburgh, Pennsylvania; life member of the Christian Women's Board of Missions, Indianapolis, Indiana; life member of the American Christian Missionary Society, Cincinnati, Ohio; organizer of the Christion Women's Florida Missionary Society at Ocoee, Florida; and Pennsylvania State secretary of the Christian Women's Board of Missions for nine years.

In 1910, after 20 years liking in Kentucky, Thurgood returned to Australia due to Charles's poor health. He wished to be close to his family. He died on 21 September 1911, in Henley Beach where he had been serving as the pastor of the Church of Christ.

=== Death ===
Thurgood died of heart failure, aged 73, on March 31, 1915, in Unley, South Australia.
