= Alice Woodhouse =

New Zealand journalist, librarian, and broadcaster

- Born: 14 December 1883; Dunedin, New Zealand
- Died: 7 October 1977 (aged 93); Havelock North. New Zealand
- Occupations: Broadcaster; Journalist; Librarian
- Years active: 1910–1975

Alice Woodhouse (14 December 1883 – 7 October 1977) was a New Zealand librarian, journalist and broadcaster. She developed an interest in literature in school and found employment with the Otago Witness in 1910 and remained with the newspaper until 1919. Woodhouse worked at the Alexander Turnbull Library from 1925 until 1946 and was its chief librarian from February 1943 to December 1944. She first appeared on radio in 1940, and four years later, won six weekly quiz contests on King of Quiz and defended the title for the next 20 years. Woodhouse was frequently on Stump the Brains Trust as a guest panellist until late 1975, Outside of radio, she was active in several organisations in Wellington.

== Biography ==
=== Early life and career ===
Woodhouse was born on 14 December 1883 in Dunedin. She was one of three children to Edith Bathgate and John Frederick Woodhouse, a solicitor. Woodhouse started to read when she was four years old and was educated at Dunedin's private girls school. It was there that she her interest in literature was developed and nurtured. Woodhouse's father encouraged her to expand her knowledge by referring to books and encyclopaedias to obtain information. Her career began in 1910 when she was employed by weekly newspaper Otago Witness to be their women's page editor. Woodhouse left the publication in 1919.

Six years later, while recuperating from an illness with relatives in Wellington, she applied for a position at the Alexander Turnbull Library. Woodhouse became employed by the Library one year later, working in the collection's referencing and cataloguing section. She was described by one visiting journalist as "enthusiastic pleasure in her work" and "eletrifying." When the library increased its staff numbers, Woodhouse was promoted to reference librarian and assistant chief librarian. She acted as chief librarian from February 1943 to December 1944 when the previous holder C. R. H. Taylor was absent because of war service. Woodhouse retired from the library in 1946, and was replaced by typist Nola Millar.

=== Later career and death ===
When she learnt that the Russell Duncan collection had more than a thousand books and pamphlets of historical importance bequeathed to the Hawke’s Bay Art Gallery and Napier Museum, Woodhouse made an offer to catalogue the collection. She remained with the museum for the next 23 years as honorary librarian, primarily working on compiling local history collections. Woodhouse relinquished the post in 1971 but maintained her interest as consultant librarian. Friends of hers persuaded her to enter a radio quiz programme called Information Please on 2ZB in the early 1940, winning £1. When the King of Quiz radio programme started in 1944, Woodhouse won six weekly contests to earn the title "Queen of Quiz" and gained national prominence by defending the title during the series's 20-year lifespan. She was selected as part of a panel to represent New Zealand in a radio quiz contest between the country and New South Wales. New Zealand won the contest.

Woodhouse acted as a frequent guest panellist on the National Programme's Stump the Brains Trust until late 1975. When she elected to end her association with the show she was New Zealand's oldest quiz panellist and possibly the world at the age of 92. Woodhouse held an active in several organisations; she was the first woman to be a member of Wellington's Institute of Public Administration New Zealand branch, she stood on the city's branch of the New Zealand Library Association, a member on its national council and was a vice-president of the New Zealand Library Association. Woodhouse also served on Hawke's Bay's regional committee of the New Zealand Historic Places Trust and regularly participated on radio discussions covering a large variety of historical and literary topics and wrote books on New Zealand history. She died on 7 October 1977 at Havelock North at the age of 93.
