= Ruth Langdon Inglis =

Manchurian-born English journalist and author

Ruth Langdon Inglis (December 17, 1927 – December 15, 2005) was an American journalist and author. She is known for her books about child-rearing.

== Early life ==
Ruth Filer Langdon was born in Mukden, Manchuria, to William Russell Langdon, an American diplomat and Japanese scholar, and Laura Filer, later to become an Oriental art dealer. In 1949, Ruth Langdon graduated with a degree in English literature from Barnard College in New York City.

== Career ==
Langdon joined her parents in Singapore, and worked as a cub reporter for the Straits Times. She then took a posting with the Continental Daily Mail in Paris.

In 1952, Langdon married Englishman Keith Woodeson, who worked for the Continental Daily Mail in Italy. The couple had one daughter, born in Boston.

Ruth worked at New York's Sarah Lawrence College, in the publicity department. She and Woodeson were divorced in 1957. The next year she married Brian Inglis, an Anglo-Irish journalist and broadcaster. Inglis was later appointed editor of The Spectator, and Ruth wrote a column for the paper under the pseudonym Leslie Adrian. In 1963, after the birth of the couple's son, she wrote a cultural profile of British youth, "Britain’s Cautious Generation", which was published in The New Leader.

In the mid-1960s, Inglis took a position as an interviewer for Nova magazine. She later began to write opinions, travel features and personality profiles for Nova, The Observer, and other magazines.

In 1962, Inglis provided public relations for the prize-winning documentary The Black Fox. She later researched and wrote about social issues in The Facts Are These (1969).

Inglis separated from Brian Inglis in 1972, and was divorced in 1974. She met the Canadian writer Eric Burdick, long a resident of Ireland and the UK; they lived together for the next two decades. In 1976 Inglis took a position at the Daily Express as a feature writer, and later a writer on the women's page. She wrote about a variety of topics, including single parenthood, domestic violence, child abuse, child development and education.

== Books ==
Inglis published a series of books about child care, beginning with A Time to Learn in 1974. The book was criticized by Kirkus Reviews for being inadequately researched; the Journal of Social Work noted useful summaries of new theories. Her book about child abuse, The Sins of the Fathers was published in 1979; followed by Must Divorce Hurt the Children? in 1982. and The Good Step-Parent's Guide in 1986. In 2017 the book continues to be held in more than 300 libraries.

Inglis later wrote The Children's War (1989), an account of Second World War evacuees, which was later featured in an exhibition at the Imperial War Museum. In the 1990s she wrote a regular column about influential educators for Nursery World magazine, including Maria Montessori, Benjamin Spock, Friedrich Froebel, and John Bowlby. Her final book, The Window in the Corner (2003), was a history and defense of children's television.

== Retirement and death ==
Inglis retired to an Edwardian house near Epping Forest, on the Essex border in England. She worked on but did not complete a memoir of her father, and gave lectures on local history. and a memoir of her father; this was never finished—she died in Leyton on December 15, 2005.
