= Dora Sanders Carney =

Canadian journalist (1903–1986)

- Born: Dora May Sanders; September 12, 1903
- Died: September 18, 1986 (aged 83)
- Other names: Mrs. James E. Carney; Dora Carney

Dora Sanders Carney was a Canadian journalist who lived in occupied Shanghai during the onset of the Second World War.

== Early life ==
Dora May Sanders was born in Capetown, South Africa, in 1903. She spent time growing up in Umpata territory South Africa, until her family moved back to Cape Town, then to England, and on to Canada. She married Jim Carney in 1934.

== Career ==
She started writing ads while living in Toronto, and her writings on the role of women are cited by other people interested in the role of women in Canada.

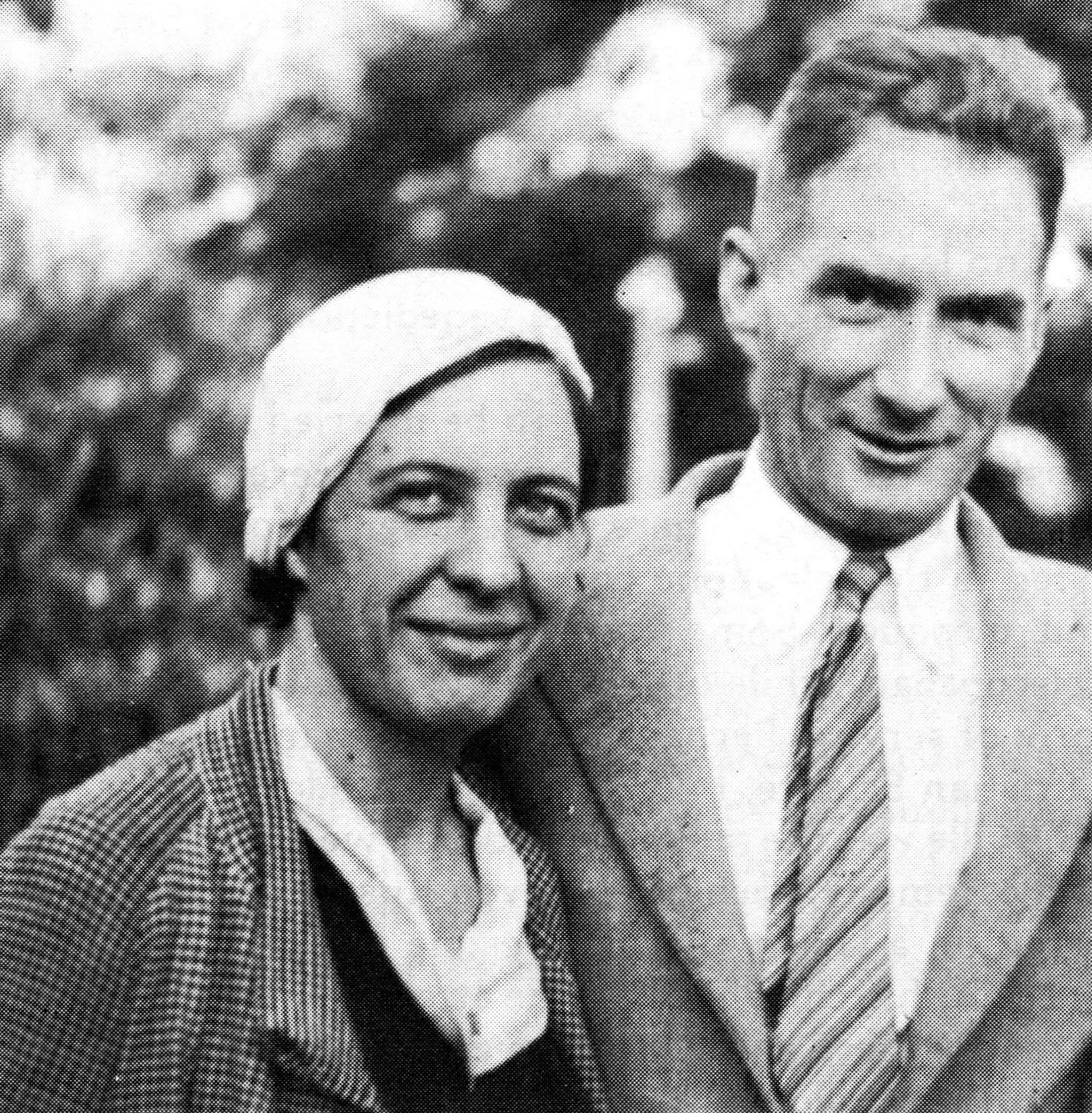
Dora and Jim Carney in 1934

Carney is best known for her writings on the time she lived in Shanghai. She arrived in Shanghai in 1933, and described the city as an "exhilarating and bewildering experience". She was one of the approximately 250 Canadians living in Shanghai at the time, and she would ultimately spend six years living in Shanghai. She was a resident there in August 1937 when Japanese troops attacked Shanghai. Carney would later describe the situation to a Toronto newspaper. Sanders left Shanghai after the attack to go to Hong Kong sailed on the Empress of Canada. Carney returned to Shanghai in 1938. While there she worked for the advertising company Millington, Ltd.

In 1961, Dora and Jim moved to Saturna Island. There, Dora wrote a column, "Gulf Islands Vignette," for the Victoria Times-Colonist newspaper.

In 1980 Sanders published a book about her experience in Shanghai, Foreign Devils Had Light Eyes; she was 77 when her book was published. Her second book was to be titled Gotta, Gotta, Gotta.

She died on Saturna Island on 18 September 1983.

== Selected publications ==
- Sanders, Dora M. (1933-02-15). "Shackled!". Maclean's Magazine. pp. 17, 41.
- Sanders, Dora M. (1933-08-15). "Women Won't Be Free". Maclean's Magazine. pp. 8, 33.
- Carney, Dora (27 November 1937). "'Refugee Dawn'". Saturday Night.
- Carney, Dora Sanders (1980). Foreign Devils Had Light Eyes. Toronto: Dorset Pub. ISBN 978-0-88893-024-8.

== Personal life ==
Her sister, Byrne Hope Sanders, was the editor of the Canadian magazine Chatalaine. Carney had four children, including Pat Carney who became a politician in Canada.
