= Nancy Dexter =

Australian journalist

Nancy Nugent Dexter (née Hanks; 16 February 1923 – 21 April 1983) was an Australian journalist.

Dexter was born Nancy Hanks in Coburg in Melbourne, but moved with her family to Wagga Wagga in New South Wales during the Great Depression. She was educated at Wagga Wagga High School until the age of 15, when although wanting to continue her education, she left school due to an unsympathetic father. She then studied shorthand and typing at a local commercial college with the support of her mother. Dexter got her first job at The Daily Advertiser, which involved "taking dictaphone copy from the Australian United Press service". She moved to Sydney two years later, working as a copy-typist in the newspaper's radio room, but lost her job when men returned from World War II. She moved to Melbourne and was hired as a typist but hated the work, and in 1946 was hired as a copy-typist for The Herald. She later wrote that she "became very frustrated" in that role as "there was nothing worse than wanting to write yourself and having to sit with your headphones on taking copy from a reporter who was mumbling around on the other end of the phone."

In 1950, Dexter became a cadet on the social pages of The Herald, but lost her job amidst retrenchments in 1951. Dexter worked for a public relations firm until being rehired by The Herald in 1960 as a journalist in the newspaper's women's section. She wrote their women's column until 1966, when she resigned, frustrated with her work environment. Dexter was then hired by The Age, where she wrote her own column, "Nancy Dexter Takes Note" in their women's section, Accent. In her columns, she discussed issues such as the fight for equal pay, abortion rights, and domestic violence. She was promoted to editor of Accent from 1972 to 1979. Her editorial style was described by the Australian Media Hall of Fame as balancing "traditional content with hard coverage of women's issues", while she herself wrote while editor "of course, there shouldn't be specific women's pages at all, but at the moment there are no other areas of the paper in which issues can be canvassed to such depth", adding that her concerns were "such social issues as baby bashing, exploitation of migrant women in factories". She was appointed as The Age's travel editor in 1979, serving until her sudden death while in Jaipur, India in 1983.

She was inducted into the Victorian Media Hall of Fame in October 2013. Her former employer, The Age, wrote that she had "helped to drag newspaper women's pages from an unleavened diet of domesticity to hard-edged coverage of women's issues".

Dexter married Harry Norman Dexter in 1951; the pair were married until his death in 1979.
