= Lillian Beynon Thomas =

Canadian journalist and feminist

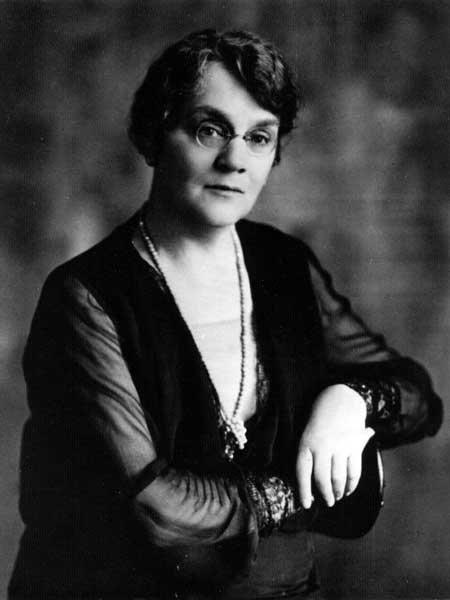
- Born: 4 September 1876; Streetsville, Ontario, Canada
- Died: 2 September 1961 (aged 84); Winnipeg, Manitoba, Canada
- Occupations: Writer, journalist and advocate

Lillian Beynon Thomas (4 September 1876 – 2 September 1961) was a Canadian journalist and feminist.

== Life ==
Lillian Beynon was born on 4 September 1876 in Streetsville, Ontario. Her parents were James Barnes and Rebecca Beynon, and her younger sister was Francis Marion Beynon. At the age of five she had an accident that left her disabled. In 1889 the Beynon family moved to Hartney, Manitoba. She studied at Portage Collegiate, then taught for a period at Chain Lakes School. She then studied at Wesley College and graduated from the University of Manitoba in 1905.

Lillian Beynon was a schoolteacher in Morden, then in 1906 joined the Manitoba Free Press. She was appointed an assistant editor of the Weekly Free Press. As editor of the Women's page she wrote the column Home Loving Hearts under the pen name of "Lillian Laurie". In the column she told of stories of women who had been abused or abandoned, and lobbied for new laws to protect the rights of women. She also pushed for prohibition of liquor, which she saw as a major cause of problems. From 1907 to 1908 she was secretary of the Winnipeg branch of the Canadian Women's Press Club. In 1910 she became a member of the Executive of the Women's University Club. That year she organized Women's Institutes in association with the University of Saskatchewan. Lillian married A. Vernon Thomas in 1911, and changed her name to Lillian Thomas.

Members of the Winnipeg branch of the Canadian Women's Press Club formed the nucleus of the Manitoba Political Equality League, which campaigned for women's suffrage, including Francis Marion Beynon, (Note: Francis Marion Beynon, sister of Lillian Beynon Thomas, edited the "Country Homemakers" page of the Grain Growers' Guide from 1912 to 1917. The paper was in favor of women's suffrage. Francis Beynon wanted the vote not just for Canadian and British women, or women with relatives serving in military, but for all women including recent immigrants.) Lillian Beynon Thomas, Nellie McClung and Ella Cora Hind. Lynn and Winona Flett also joined, as did men such as George Fisher Chipman and Fred Dixon. Lillian Beynon Thomas was the first president, but Dr. Mary E. Crawford soon took over the leadership.

In late June 1917 Francis Marion Beynon left Winnipeg and moved to New York City. In 1917 A. Vernon Thomas was fired as legislative reporter of the Free Press for publicly opposing conscription, and the Thomases also moved to New York. They spent 1918–23 in New York. Lillian Benyon Thomas and her sister worked at the Seamen's Church Institute, an Episcopalian Mission for sailors in New York. After they returned to Canada, Lillian pursued a career as a writer. She wrote a number of successful plays, including Among the Maples, Jim Barber's Spite Fence and As the Twig Is Bent. She published her first novel, New Secret, in 1946.

Lillian Beynon Thomas died in Winnipeg on 2 September 1961.

== Works ==
Published work included:

- Thomas, Lillian Beynon (1932). Among the Maples.
- Thomas, Lillian Beynon (1935). Jim Barber's Spite Fence: A Comedy in One Act. S. French (Canada) Limited.
- Thomas, Lillian Beynon (1940). As the Twig Is Bent.
- Thomas, Lillian Beynon (1946). New Secret. T. Allen.
- Thomas, Lillian Beynon (1948). Some Manitoba Women who Did First Things. Historical and Scientific Society of Manitoba.

== Sources ==
- "Beynon, Francis Marion". Simon Fraser University Library.
- Freeman, Barbara M. (14 December 2011). Beyond Bylines: Media Workers and Women's Rights in Canada. Wilfrid Laurier Univ. Press. ISBN 978-1-55458-313-3.
- Goldsborough, Gordon (28 July 2012). "Lillian Beynon Thomas (1874-1961)". Memorable Manitobans. Manitoba Historical Society.
- Lewis, Norah L. (28 April 1998). Dear Editor and Friends: Letters from Rural Women of the North-West, 1900-1920. Wilfrid Laurier Univ. Press. ISBN 978-0-88920-287-0.
- "Lillian Beynon Thomas". MHS. 23 August 2009.
- "Political Equality League". Manitoba Historical Society.
- "The Political Equality League; Nellie McClung". Teacherweb. Archived from the original on 23 October 2014.
