= Pat Carney =

Canadian politician (1935–2023)

The Honourable Pat Carney PC CM
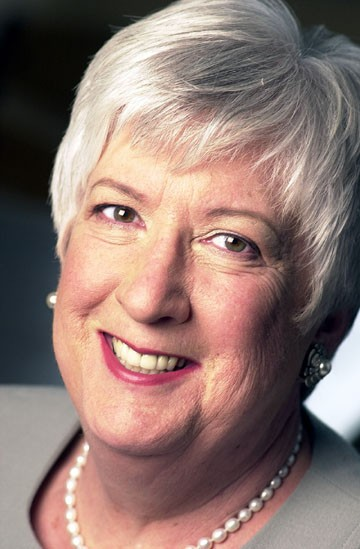

President of the Treasury Board
- In office March 31, 1988 – December 7, 1988
- Prime Minister: Brian Mulroney
- Preceded by: Don Mazankowski
- Succeeded by: Doug Lewis (acting)

Minister for International Trade
- In office June 30, 1986 – March 30, 1988
- Prime Minister: Brian Mulroney
- Preceded by: James Kelleher
- Succeeded by: John Crosbie

Minister of Energy, Mines, and Resources
- In office September 17, 1984 – June 29, 1986
- Prime Minister: Brian Mulroney
- Preceded by: Gerald Regan
- Succeeded by: Marcel Masse
Parliamentary constituencies
Member of Parliament for Vancouver Centre
In office April 14, 1980 – October 1, 1988
Preceded by	Art Phillips
Succeeded by	Kim Campbell
Canadian Senator from British Columbia
In office August 30, 1990 – January 31, 2008
Nominated by	Brian Mulroney
Appointed by	Ray Hnatyshyn
Preceded by	Nancy Bell (1989)

Personal details
- Born: Patricia Dora Carney; May 26, 1935 Shanghai, China
- Died: July 25, 2023 (aged 88) Vancouver, British Columbia, Canada
- Party: Conservative (2003–2023)
- Other political affiliations: Progressive Conservative (1979–2003)
- Profession: Politician, journalist
- Committees: Chair, Standing Committee on Energy, the Environment and Natural Resources (1994–1996)

Patricia Dora Carney PC CM (May 26, 1935 – July 25, 2023) was a Canadian politician who served as a member of parliament from 1980 to 1988 and as a Senator from 1990 to 2008.

A member of the Progressive Conservative Party of Canada, she first ran for the House of Commons of Canada during the 1979 Canadian federal election, but was defeated. She ran again in the election the following year and won, representing the district of Vancouver Centre. After winning a second term in the 1984 elections, she held three cabinet positions under Prime Minister Brian Mulroney: minister of Energy, Mines and Resources from 1984 to 1986, minister of International Trade from 1986 to 1988 and President of the Treasury Board for eight months in 1988. She was the first woman named to each of these three major economic cabinet positions. She did not seek a third term during the next federal election in 1988, and was succeeded by future prime minister Kim Campbell. In 1990, Mulroney appointed her to the Senate, where she served until her resignation in 2008.

== Early life ==
Carney was born in Shanghai, Republic of China to parents Dora May Sanders and John James Carney (1894-1976), a First World War veteran and Lieutenant with the 72nd Battalion of the Seaforth Highlanders of Canada from British Columbia, Canada who relocated to Shanghai and worked as a public health inspector and police officer for over twenty years. Carney had three siblings, a brother named Thomas (Tom), a twin brother named John James (Jim) and a younger sister, Norah (Nora). Following increasing violence as a result of Japanese occupation of Shanghai and her father's interest in pursuing veterinarian medicine at the age of 51, the family relocated to the small town of Morriston, Ontario in 1940 just before Japanese forces began to inter foreign residents. As a result of her father's studies and subsequent work as a veterinarian, the family moved to Guelph in 1944 and then to Victoria, British Columbia a year later. They moved again in 1949 to Nelson in British Columbia's Kootenay Region.

Carney's brother recalled that she demonstrated a keen interest in organizing various events for her family and neighbours by the time she was ten years old, including plays, which she frequently wrote and starred in. Although Carney's mother was proud of her creative inclinations, her father "was equally sure it was all God-damned foolishness, and that [she'd] starve to death". The reason for the family's move to Nelson was, in part, so Carney and her siblings could work on a farm and learn basic homesteading skills.

== Education and journalist career ==
In the early 1950s, Carney left the family farm for Vancouver, British Columbia where she worked as a freelance journalist for the Vancouver Sun and The Province. In 1956 when Carney was twenty-one years old, Carney married the Vancouver Province's rewrite chief, Gordon Dickson. He was fifteen years older than her and had a daughter from a previous marriage. Carney kept her maiden name and continued to work as a freelance journalist to support Dickson while he finished law school, which was unusual for women of the time. Carney and Dickson had a son together but would ultimately divorce in the late 1960s.

Carney attended the University of British Columbia and graduated in 1960 with a bachelor's degree in economics and political science. Alongside her twin brother Jim, Carney joined the university's student-run newspaper, the Ubyssey. Carney later recalled that the Ubyssey was where the siblings "pushed open the door and entered the rest of [their] lives." Jim pursued a career in radio and television and in 1965, Carney became a business columnist for the Vancouver Sun. Throughout the 1960s and 1970s, Carney continued to freelance for newspapers within Canada and even globally, writing for the Toronto Star, Maclean's, the Financial Post, The New York Times, and the Times of London about financial news and economic developments, particularly those in northern Canada. She also wrote television specials for the CBC and CTV on finance and economics.

== Gemini North ==
In 1970, a strike at the Vancouver Sun left Carney, who was recently divorced and a single mother, unemployed. After struggling to make ends meet as a freelance journalist, Carney went north to the city of Whitehorse, Yukon and started a consulting firm with her brother Jim. Trading under the name of Gemini North, Ltd., the firm worked on a number of projects related to the development of lumber and gas and oil industries in Yukon and the Northwest Territories (NWT). Gemini North also produced a number of studies on the potential social and economic impacts of such projects on local residents and Indigenous people in northern Canada.

Following the 1970 Centennial Royal Tour of the NWT, Carney, at the invitation of the NWT Commissioner, Stuart Hodgson, produced a book about the tour. Carney became a close friend of Stuart Hodgson and accompanied the Commissioner and his party in the 1971 Canadian North Pole expedition an aborted attempt to reach the Pole by Twin Otter in a bid to establish the route for tourist adventurers. Carney was joined by her brother during the flight in and out of the Polar Basin.

In the early 1970s, Gemini North was commissioned to conduct a survey of local opinion about the installation of a gas pipeline along the Mackenzie River Valley. Carney organised an information tour of the valley with stops at all the river settlements where the fly-in pipeliners conducted workshops explaining to the local people details about the pipeline project. The pipeline's tour was shadowed by the president of the Northwest Territories Indian Brotherhood, James Wah-shee, and was seen in native rights circles as a demonstration of the Brotherhood's aim to be consulted before any pipeline work started. Shortly after this tour the Brotherhood applied for a development caveat to stop all development on treaty land. This caveat eventually led to the pipeline inquiry which resulted in the project being shelved.

A fictionalized account of these events was published in 2008.

== Political career ==
=== Member of Parliament ===
Carney first ran for the House of Commons of Canada as a Progressive Conservative candidate in the 1979 election and was defeated. She was elected in the 1980 election as the Member of Parliament (MP) from Vancouver Centre.

=== Cabinet minister ===
When the Tories formed government under Prime Minister Brian Mulroney as a result of the 1984 election, Carney was appointed to Cabinet as Minister of Energy, Mines and Resources, and was responsible for dismantling the previous Canadian government's unpopular National Energy Program.

In 1986, she was named Minister of International Trade and, as such, was involved in negotiating the Canada-US Free Trade Agreement.

Carney did not run for re-election in the 1988 election due to continuing pain from arthritis.

=== Senator ===
In 1990, she was appointed to the Canadian Senate by Governor General Ray Hnatyshyn. In January 1991, Carney—a pro-choice advocate of women's rights to abortion—voted against the restrictive, anti-abortion Bill C-43 proposed by her successor as MP for Vancouver Centre and fellow Conservative party member, Kim Campbell. Despite "heavy, heavy pressure" from Campbell and other party members, Carney maintained her opposition and the bill failed in the Senate with a tie vote, the first legislation to do so in 30 years. In 2023, Carney recalled that "Conservative senators were not expected to vote down their own government's bill. We had the option to simply abstain." Several male senators planned to abstain as they felt abortion was a "women's issue" but when they saw Carney vote no, it spurred them to similarly oppose the bill and contribute to its defeat.

In 1997, Carney suggested that British Columbia might benefit from separating from Canada.

In 2000, Carney acted on concerns that landmark lighthouses on both Canadian coasts were being neglected by teaming up with Senator Mike Forrestall from Nova Scotia to introduce the Heritage Lighthouse Protection Act, a private members bill which enjoyed consistent multi-party support in subsequent minority Parliaments and which received royal assent in 2008.

On October 11, 2007, the Prime Minister's Office announced that Senator Carney intended to resign, two years in advance of the mandatory retirement age of 75 years. She officially resigned on January 31, 2008. In 2011, she was made a Member of the Order of Canada "for her public service as a journalist, politician and senator."

== Archives ==
There are Patricia Carney fonds at Library and Archives Canada and the University of British Columbia.

== Death ==
Carney died on July 25, 2023, at the age of 88.

== Electoral history ==
1984 Canadian federal election: Vancouver Centre
Party	Candidate	Votes	%	±%
Progressive Conservative	Pat Carney	21,704	43.23	+7.96
New Democratic	Johanna den Hertog	16,283	32.43	+0.66
Liberal	Paul E. Manning	10,654	21.22	−10.20
Green	Paul Watson	533	1.06	+0.95
Rhinoceros	Danny Tripper Parro	487	0.97	+0.25
Libertarian	Paul A. Geddes	316	0.63	–
Communist	Maurice Rush	135	0.27	−0.16
Confederation of Regions	Poldi Meindl	98	0.20	–
Total valid votes		50,210	100.0	
Progressive Conservative hold		Swing		+3.65

1980 Canadian federal election: Vancouver Centre
Party	Candidate	Votes	%	±%
Progressive Conservative	Pat Carney	16,462	35.27	+0.84
New Democratic	Ron Johnson	14,830	31.77	+1.80
Liberal	Art Phillips	14,667	31.42	−3.22
Rhinoceros	David J. Longworth	337	0.72	–
Communist	Jack Phillips	200	0.43	+0.18
Independent	John Elliot	101	0.22	−0.38
Independent	Paul Watson	54	0.12	–
Marxist–Leninist	Greg Corcoran	24	0.05	−0.06
Total valid votes		46,675	100.0	
Progressive Conservative gain from Liberal		Swing		−0.48
lop.parl.ca

1979 Canadian federal election: Vancouver Centre
Party	Candidate	Votes	%	±%
Liberal	Art Phillips	15,430	34.64	−7.09
Progressive Conservative	Pat Carney	15,335	34.43	−3.10
New Democratic	Ron Johnson	13,350	29.97	+10.58
Independent	John Elliot	267	0.60	–
Communist	Bert Ogden	111	0.25	−0.22
Marxist–Leninist	Greg Corcoran	48	0.11	−0.20
Total valid votes		44,541	100.0	
Liberal hold		Swing		−2.00
