= Harriet Hooton =

Australian editor

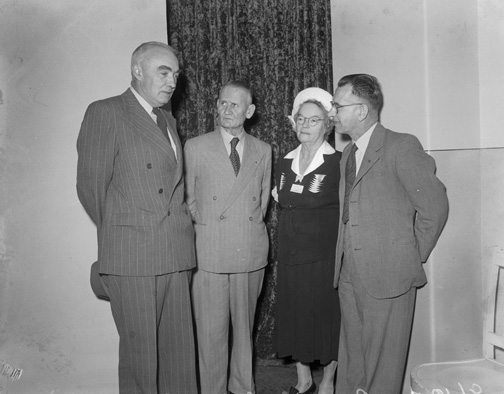
16th Conference of the Federation of Parents and Citizens Associations. Harriet Hooton third from left.

Harriet (Ettie) Hooton (13 July 1875 – 21 April 1960) was a West Australian women's rights activist and editor. She was active in a number of organisations including the Women's Service Guild, the National Council of Women in Western Australia, the Australian Natives Association and the Australian Labor Federation. She was the first secretary of the Western Australian Parents and Citizens Association.

== Biography ==
Hooton was born in Biraganbil, New South Wales and educated in Geelong, Victoria. She went to Kalgoorlie in the 1890s during the gold rushes. During her time as secretary of the Western Australian Parents and Citizens Association issues such as better medical and dental treatment for school children, hostels for country students and the benefits of new technology in schools were addressed. She opposed conscription in World War I and during the Great Depression was secretary to Bessie Rischbieth the president of the Citizens Committee for the Relief of Unemployed Girls.

She gave evidence at the Royal Commission on Youth Employment and the Apprenticeship System in 1937 and advocated for the recognition of housework as a profession. In the same year she was a recipient of the Kings George's 'Coronation award'.

After travelling overseas and visiting the League of Nations and International Labour Office her interests widened to include internationalism and world peace.

Hooton lived in Mount Hawthorn and was an active member of the Mount Hawthorn Progress Association, campaigning for the establishment of a kindergarten. From 1926 until 1941 she edited the Parents' and Citizens' Broadcaster and from 1927 the women's page of the Westralian Worker. In 1937 she unsuccessfully sought preselection as a Labor candidate for the Senate.

Harriet Hooton died on 21 April 1960 in North Perth.
