= Byrne Hope Sanders =

Canadian journalist

Minnie O'Byrne Hope Sanders (22 May 1902 – 24 June 1981) was a South African-born Canadian journalist. She was the editor of Chatelaine magazine from 1926 to 1952.

== Early life ==
Sanders was born in Port Alfred, South Africa, on 22 May 1902. Port Alfred was in what was then known as the Cape Colony, or the Cape of Good Hope, after which she was partially named; O’Byrne came from her mother’s Irish heritage.

Sanders' father, Harry Sanders (1872-1952) had immigrated to South Africa as a tutor to his brother-in-law’s family. There, he met and married Lucy Emma May Bing (1875-1947), South-African born but Irish in ancestry, temperament, and musical ability, according to her daughter’s Reminiscences. Sanders was the eldest of four children: she was followed by Dora (1903-1986), John (1905 - after 1986), and Wilfrid (1907-1990).

The family spent her early years travelling throughout the southern African states, where her father worked as a lawyer in rural communities, moving between them in a "cape cart" pulled by oxen: "for the most part we were isolated in black communities, for my father practiced law up in Rhodesia and the Transvaal. I can remember no white children, as there were no schools, and Mother taught us to read and write. We moved as a unit, learning friendship with each other, and becoming unusually self-contained as a family."

When the Boer War and a tsetse fly plague created financial hardship that the family could not overcome, they emigrated, moving first to England, where they stayed for a time with Charles Higham, the brother-in-law who had first employed Harry in South Africa. Finding no work in England, the family moved in 1912 to Canada, where Sanders continued an education begun in the Church school in Liverpool.

== Career ==
Sanders attended St. Mildred's College School in Toronto and “prepared for her Ontario College of Music exams and wrote young people’s columns for the Mail & Empire and Toronto Weekly Star.” As a teen, she dropped "Minnie" and the "O" from her name, published her first article in “The Average Woman and the Occasional Man” section of the Toronto Globe, wrote for the Toronto Sunday World, and contributed to the women’s page at the Woodstock Sentinel-Review. In 1923, she and her sister Dora May Sanders shared an apartment on College Street in Toronto; they both held jobs at the T. Eaton company, where they earned $25 a week. In 1926, she became editor of Business Woman magazine; and in September 1929 of Chatelaine, where she remained until January 1952.

== Family life ==
In 1932, Sanders married Frank Sperry (1888-1976), who had been the art director for Maclean’s and Chatelaine magazines. Sanders kept her job after her marriage on the condition that she “not have children” and that she retain her maiden name as her byline, “keeping the wedding highly secret.” This caused somewhat of an issue when her two children (Dora [“Dodie”] Frances Sperry and David Byrne Sperry) arrived in 1932 and 1934, but with the assistance of her sister Dora, who took over her editorial duties for a number of months during her second pregnancy, Sanders retained her position as editor of Chatelaine. Once her married state became public, she retained her professional name of Byrne Hope Sanders. In 1942, the National Post called her “Miss Sanders,” but noted that “in private life she is Mrs. Frank Sperry.”

== Wartime service ==
In 1942, Byrne took a volunteer position with the Wartime Prices and Trade Board in Ottawa, as director of the Consumers' Representation Branch, where “more than 15,000 women worked as volunteers with Sanders” as “she urged women to lead the fight against inflation.” For her role in the wartime efforts, she was awarded a CBE in July 1946.

== Later career and death ==
She returned to Chatelaine in January 1947 as editor. In January 1952, she and her brother Wilfrid, a director for the Canadian Institute of Public Opinion (which provided data for the Gallup Poll) founded Sanders Marketing Research. They then bought a majority share of Canadian Institute of Public Opinion, which Byrne Hope Sanders ran from 1958 until the company was sold in 1973.

Byrne Hope Sanders died in 1981 in Toronto.

== Publications ==
- Emily Murphy, Crusader ("Janey Canuck") (Toronto: Macmillan, 1945)
- Famous Women: Carr, Hind, Gullen, Murphy (Toronto: Clarke, Irwin, 1958)
- Hey, Ma! I Did It (Toronto: Clarke, 1953) by Margaret Aitken, with Byrne Hope Sanders
