= Ella Cora Hind =

Canadian journalist (1861–1942)

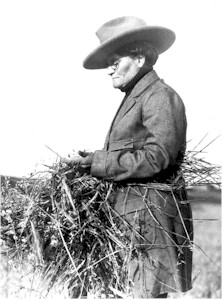
- Born: September 18, 1861; Toronto
- Died: October 6, 1942 (aged 81); Winnipeg, Manitoba
- Occupation: journalist
- Known for: women's rights activism

Ella Cora Hind (September 18, 1861 – October 6, 1942) was a Canadian journalist, agricultural expert and Women's rights activist based in Winnipeg.

She became widely known for her exceptionally accurate predictions of Canadian prairie crop yields. During the Great Depression, her assessments were relied upon internationally by grain traders, government officials, and agricultural organizations.

Hind was also active in the women’s suffrage movement in Manitoba and helped establish organizations that advanced women’s political rights. In addition to her journalism, she published travel and agricultural writing and received numerous professional honours, including an honorary law degree from the University of Manitoba in 1935.

== Early life ==
E. Cora Hind was born in Toronto on September 18, 1861, to Edwin Hind and Jane Carroll. She was two years old when she lost her mother, and five years old when her father died. After the death of her mother, she and her older brothers Joseph and George moved to Artemisia Township to live with their paternal grandfather, Joseph Hind, and aunt Alice.

Hind's grandfather taught her about farming, horses, and cattle. Living several miles from school delayed her education until 1872 so Aunt Alice home-schooled her until the Province built a school on her grandfather's land. Her family relocated to Flesherton, Ontario, where Cora finished her primary education. She attended high school at the Collegiate Institute of Orillia and lived with her uncle, George Hind. This is where she wrote her Third Class teacher examination.

== Career ==
After high school, Hind moved with her Aunt Alice and cousins Jean and Jacques to Winnipeg in 1882. Her aunt ran a dress shop, and a few weeks after the move Hind received a letter saying that she failed her algebra part of the teacher's exam, thus her credentials were inadequate.

Hind then approached the Editor of the Manitoba Free Press, W.F. Luxton, about a job. Luxton indicated that a newsroom was no place for a woman with no journalistic experience. "A few months later she submitted an article to Luxton. To her surprise he accepted it, though he could not bring himself to credit her as the author. Hind then became a typist for the paper. "She worked there until 1893, when she opened her own business as a stenographer." Hind then became the first public typist in Manitoba.

In 1890, Ella Cora Hind and her aunt Alice joined the Manitoba chapter of the Woman's Christian Temperance Union, the oldest continuing non-sectarian women's organization in the world. Founded in Evanston, Illinois in 1873, the group spearheaded international crusades for prohibition. Hind also worked with Dr. Amelia Yeomans to support women's right to vote. Together, they formed the Manitoba Equal Suffrage Club. Goals included improving the lives of women and the poor. Hind also became a member of the Winnipeg chapter of the Canadian Women's Press Club.

Throughout, Hind retained a strong interest in farming. Winnipeg being the grain trade center of the West helped her become not only a regular reporter but also the Commercial and Agricultural Editor of the Manitoba Free Press. Between 1935 and 1937, Hind travelled to 27 wheat producing countries to research best practices as well as climate change influences. In a series of letters to the Winnipeg Free Press, she commented on social and historical contexts. By popular demand, Hind published a selection of these letters in her 1937 book Seeing for Myself. The book was so successful that a second book, My Travels and Findings (1939) featured writings from her personal papers.

In 1912, E. Cora Hind formed the Political Equality League with leading social activists Lillian Beynon Thomas and Nellie McClung. Their campaign won women the right to vote in Manitoba in 1916.

Hind received many honours from The Western Canada Livestock Union, Wool Growers of Manitoba, and Canadian Society of Technical Agriculturists. The University of Manitoba also presented her with an honorary LLB degree in 1935.

== Death ==
Hind died on October 6, 1942, in Winnipeg. Trading at the Winnipeg Grain Exchange was halted for two minutes in her memory. The United Grain Growers created the Cora Hind Fellowship for research in agriculture, and the Winnipeg Free Press created the Cora Hind Scholarship in Home Economics.

== Select bibliography ==
- The story of the big ditch. [Alberta?]. 1912.
- Seeing for myself: agricultural conditions around the world. Toronto: MacMillan Co. of Canada. 1937. OCLC 7382871.
- My travels and findings. Toronto: Macmillan. 1939. OCLC 65668571.
