= Kit Coleman =

Newspaper columnist and war correspondent

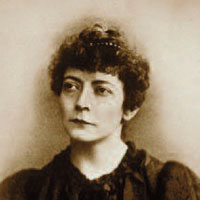
- Born: Kathleen Blake Coleman; 20 February 1856; Castleblakeney, County Galway, Ireland
- Died: 16 May 1915 (aged 59); Hamilton, Ontario, Canada
- Citizenship: Canadian
- Occupation: War correspondent
- Known for: World's first accredited female war correspondent

Kathleen Blake "Kit" Coleman (born Catherine Ferguson, 20 February 1856 – 16 May 1915) was an Irish-Canadian newspaper columnist. Coleman was one of the earliest accredited female war correspondents, covering the Spanish–American War for the Toronto Daily Mail in 1898. She served, also, as the first president of the Canadian Women's Press Club, an organization of women journalists.

== Early life ==
Kit Coleman was born Catherine Ferguson to Patrick and Mary Ferguson (née Burke) in May 1856 at Castleblakeney, County Galway, her birth is often listed incorrectly as 1864 presuming her maiden name is Blake. Her father was a middle-class farmer. Coleman was educated at Loretto Abbey in Rathfarnham and a finishing school in Belgium. As an adult, she recalled her parents influencing her love of creative activities; her father had given her his love of books, and her mother, who was blind, taught her an appreciation of music and to also how to play several instruments. The strongest influence on her intellectual life came from her uncle Thomas Nicholas Burke, a Dominican priest and a renowned liberal and orator, who taught her religious and social tolerance, an attitude that was reflected in her journalism as an adult.

Coleman married young to an elderly man and wealthy landowner Thomas Willis, the sources conflict stating either at age 16 or 20, a man 40 years her senior, under her adopted name Kathleen Blake. The couple had one child who died in early childhood, and Willis died soon after. The marriage had not been a happy one, resulting in her disinheritance by her husband's family. She emigrated to Canada as a young widow in 1884. In Canada, she worked as a secretary until she married her boss, Edward Watkins. She lived in Toronto and Winnipeg, where she bore two children (Thady and Patricia) by her second husband.

In 1889, following the death of Watkins, or more probably, their divorce, Coleman first turned to cleaning houses to support herself and her two children, then began writing articles for local magazines, mainly Toronto's Saturday Night.

== Journalist ==
Coleman then moved to Toronto to pursue journalism in 1890. As "Kit of the Mail", she was the first female journalist to be in charge of her own section of a Canadian newspaper. She was hired by the Toronto Daily Mail (later the Daily Mail and Empire). In the 1890s and early 1900s, she ran a seven-column page in the Toronto Mail. Called "Woman's Kingdom," it came out once a week. She began by writing articles on lighter topics typical of the women's columns that had begun to appear in newspapers at that time, topics such as theatre criticism, as well as fashion notes and recipes. In one of her most popular features she gave the first advice to the lovelorn. She rebelled against her editors’ assumptions that women were interested only in housekeeping, fashion, and her advice column, and insisted on writing about other things she believed would interest them: politics, business, religion, and science. Her column was so outspoken that it attracted a wide following, including Canadian Prime Minister Wilfrid Laurier. Her columns also covered topics such as social reform and women's issues, examining controversies like domestic violence and the poor working conditions women endured. Coleman's columns were syndicated to newspapers across Canada. She worked for the Mail until 1911.

Coleman increasingly began to write columns covering areas in the mainstream news, and soon became one of the Mail's star reporters. In 1891 she interviewed the celebrated French actress Sarah Bernhardt, who was performing in Canada. She was a special correspondent for Toronto Mail during the World's Fair, Chicago, 1893; the Mid-winter Fair, San Francisco, 1894; British West Indies, 1894; and Queen Victoria's Diamond Jubilee, London, 1897. Her reputation grew internationally, and in 1894 an American reference work called her writing "brilliant" and noted that no woman journalist, and possibly no male below the rank of editor-in-chief, had a more direct influence on the prestige and circulation of any North American newspaper.

== Covering the Spanish–American War in Cuba ==
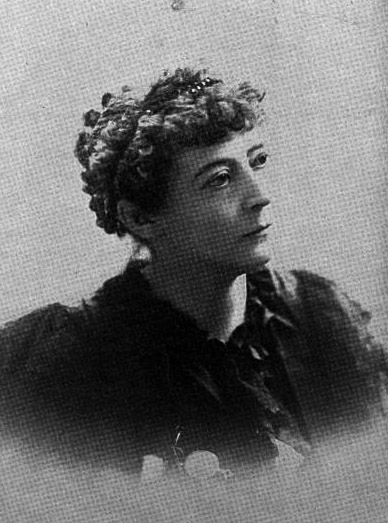
Coleman, circa 1896

During the Spanish–American War of 1898, Coleman volunteered to go to Cuba to cover the battle activity at the front. The Toronto Daily Mail sent her to Cuba, exploiting the opportunity to garner sensationalist publicity. However, she was told by her supervisors to write features and "guff," as she called it, not the news from the front, apparently believing that this would not be appropriate for a woman. She received her war correspondent accreditation from the United States government, becoming North America's first fully accredited woman war correspondent.

She was authorized to accompany American troops, but was vehemently opposed by other correspondents and the military authorities, who nearly succeeded in keeping her stranded in Florida. Blake persevered and arrived in Cuba in July 1898, just before the end of the war. Her accounts of the aftermath of the war and of its human casualties were the peak of her journalism career and made her famous. On her way back to Canada, Kathleen stopped in Washington where she addressed the International Press Union of Women Journalists.

== Later career ==
Upon her return from Cuba, Coleman married Theobald Coleman and moved to Copper Cliff, Ontario, where her husband was company doctor for the Canadian Copper Company. In 1901 the Colemans moved to Hamilton, Ontario.

In 1904, in order to fight discrimination against women in the journalism profession, she helped establish the Canadian Women's Press Club, and was named its first President. Notwithstanding her own pioneering work as a journalist in an overwhelmingly male profession, as well as her activist writing on many women's rights topics, Coleman did not publicly endorse feminism and women's suffrage until 1910. Many other woman journalists, including her Mail and Empire colleague Katherine Hale (Amelia Beers Warnock), viewed Coleman as a pioneer and a role model, and the suffragists among them hoped that she would become an activist for the women's suffrage cause. Coleman's political ambivalence came partly because of the editorial position of the Toronto Mail and Mail and Empire; both newspapers were adamantly opposed to it. She also felt unsure about the extent to which women – and "objective" journalists – should entangle themselves in political and social issues.

Coleman was also a poet and published books of poetry.

== Death ==
Coleman contracted pneumonia and died on 16 May 1915, in Hamilton, Ontario.

== Legacy ==
=== Firsts ===
- She became the first female journalist in Canada to oversee her own section of a newspaper when she wrote and edited the women's pages of the Toronto Daily Mail.
- She became North America’s first accredited female war correspondent while reporting on the Spanish–American War in 1898.
- She was the first woman appointed as a special correspondent to cover a major conflict, receiving permission to report from the field during the Spanish–American War.
- She co-founded the Canadian Women's Press Club in 1904 and served as its first president.
- She became the first Canadian journalist to write a syndicated newspaper column.
- She was among Canada's earliest professional travel journalists, writing foreign dispatches from Europe, the United States, and Cuba beginning in the early 1890s.

=== Honours and recognition ===
- She was designated a Person of National Historic Significance by the Government of Canada in 2011.
- The Royal Canadian Mint issued a commemorative silver dollar in her honour in 2023.
- In 2023, the Mint also released a 99.99% pure gold coin marking the 125th anniversary of her role as North America’s first accredited female war correspondent.
- Library and Archives Canada holds the Kathleen Blake "Kit" Coleman fonds (archival collection R2590; formerly MG30-C152), which contains 60 cm of textual records, 91 photographs, and two medals spanning 1925–1981.

== See also ==
- Lady Florence Dixie - first woman war correspondent
- Women journalists
- War correspondent
