= Edmonton Bulletin =

Former Canadian newspaper

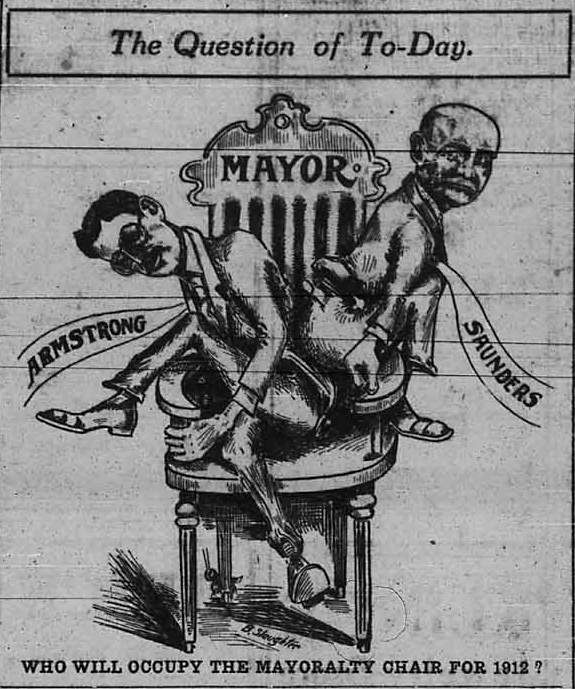
Editorial cartoon about the February 1912 Edmonton mayoral election on the February 16, 1912 issue of the Edmonton Bulletin

The Edmonton Bulletin was a newspaper in Edmonton, Alberta, published from 1880 until January 20, 1951. It was founded by Edmonton pioneer Frank Oliver, later a Liberal Member of Parliament and cabinet minister in the Canadian Government.

In founding the Edmonton Bulletin in 1880, Oliver was assisted by Alexander Taylor, the city's first telegraph operator. It was Edmonton's undisputed foremost newspaper until the Edmonton Journal was founded in 1903.

From 1881 to 1884 Oliver was co-proprietor with Alexander Dunlop, then from 1884 to 1898 Oliver was sole proprietor. The Bulletin Publishing Company (Frank Oliver president) owned it to 1923, when Oliver sold his investment, and George B. O'Connor reorganized it. A U.S. firm Edmonton Pub. Ltd. operated it for a short time, then Oliver and C.H. Stout resumed its operation.

The Bulletin was sold in 1925 to Charles E. Campbell, former owner of the Vancouver Sun. For 19 months, from May 1946 and early 1948, the Bulletin and the Edmonton Journal were published as one newspaper due to a printers' strike.

On January 2, 1948, The Bulletin resumed a separate existence and it was announced that the Bulletin had been sold to a company headed by Max Bell.

Under Oliver, the Bulletin was the Liberal Oliver's mouthpiece, while the Journal took an editorial stance friendly to the Conservative Party. The Bulletin was a herald for Alberta's small farmers and immigrants, while the Journal supported business candidates. The newspapers' different outlooks were shown clearly in 1917 when the Bulletin supported Laurier's Liberals and the Journal supported Robert Borden's Conservative Union government and conscription.

The Bulletin folded on January 20, 1951.

== Notable staff ==
- John Ducey, sportswriter
