= Nellie McClung =

Canadian author, activist, suffragist and politician (1873–1951)

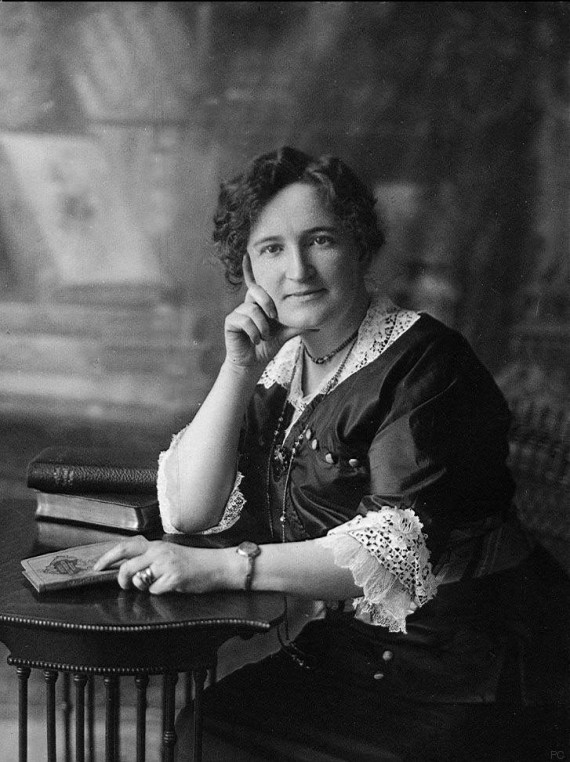

Member of the Legislative Assembly of Alberta for Edmonton
- In office 18 July 1921 – 28 June 1926
- Succeeded by: John Lymburn, Charles Weaver, Charles Gibbs, Warren Prevey and David Duggan

Personal details
- Born: Nellie Letitia Mooney; 20 October 1873 Chatsworth, Ontario, Canada
- Died: 1 September 1951 (aged 77) Victoria, British Columbia, Canada
- Party: Liberal
- Spouse: Robert Wesley McClung (m. 1896)
- Children: 5
- Occupation: Politician, Writer
- Known for: Women's rights activism

Nellie Letitia McClung (née Mooney; 20 October 1873 – 1 September 1951) was a Canadian author, politician, and social activist, who is regarded as one of Canada's most prominent suffragists. She began her career in writing with the 1908 book Sowing Seeds in Danny, and would eventually publish sixteen books, including two autobiographies. She played a leading role in the women's suffrage movement in Canada, helping to grant women the right to vote in Alberta and Manitoba in 1916. McClung was elected to the Legislative Assembly of Alberta in 1921, where she served until 1926.

As a member of the Famous Five, she was one of five women who took the Persons Case first to the Supreme Court of Canada, and then to the Judicial Committee of the Privy Council, for the right of women to serve in the Senate of Canada. McClung was the first woman appointed to the board of the Canadian Broadcasting Corporation in 1936. She served as a delegate to the League of Nations in Geneva, Switzerland in 1938.

== Early life ==
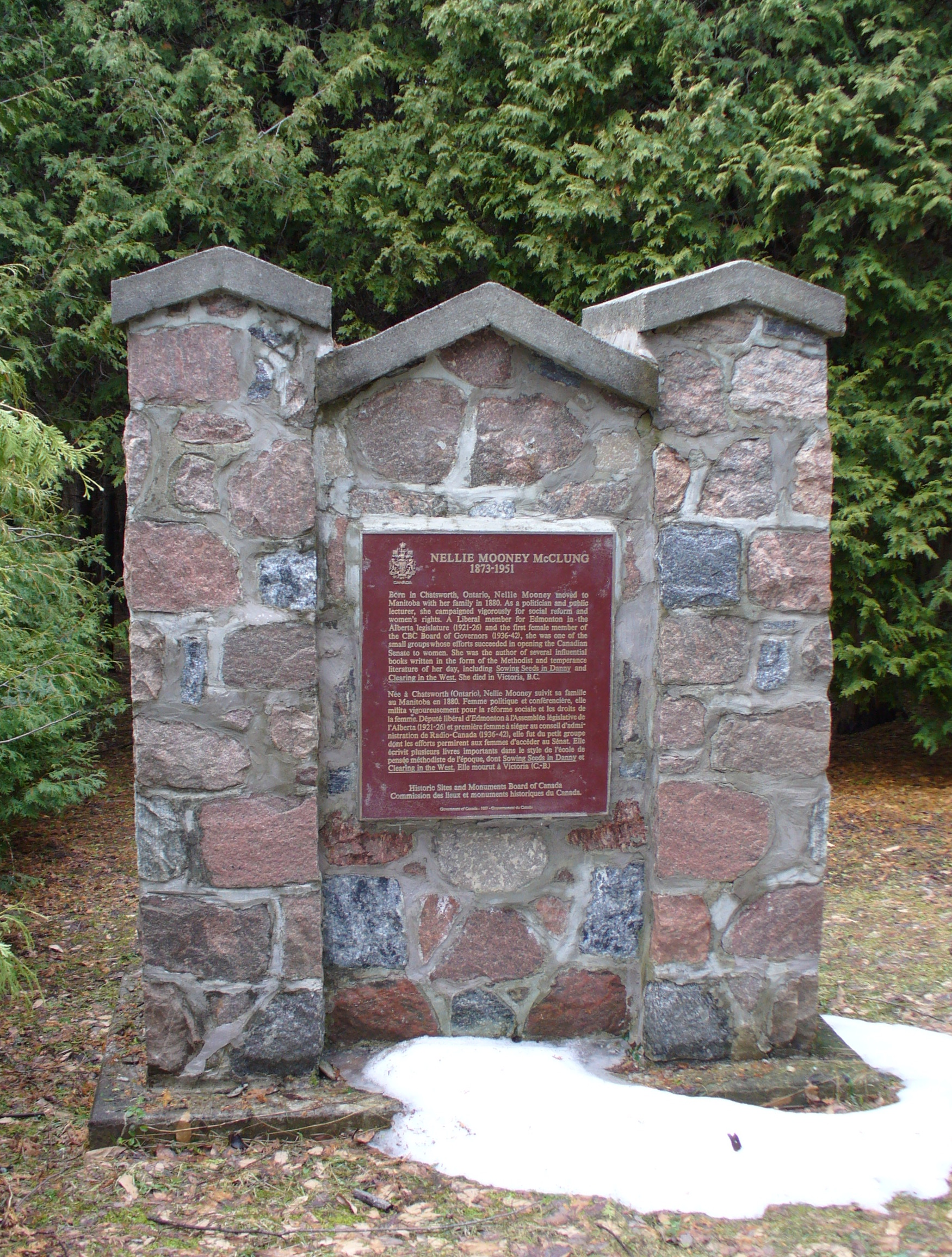
Historical plaque about McClung, located south of Chatsworth, Ontario

McClung was born Nellie Letitia Mooney on 20 October 1873 in Chatsworth, Ontario, the youngest of six children of John and Letitia Mooney (née McCurdy). Her father had acquired 60 hectares (150 acres) of property in Chatsworth, but the soil was not of good quality and the family struggled to make ends meet. In 1880, when Nellie was seven, they moved to the Souris River valley, two hundred kilometers west of Winnipeg. Nellie graduated from the Manitoba Normal School when she was sixteen. After receiving her teaching certificate, she acquired a teaching position in Hazel, Manitoba, earning a salary of $40 a month. After teaching for eighteen months in Hazel, she moved to Manitou.

While teaching in Manitou, she boarded with the McClung family. She was captivated by Mrs. Annie E. McClung, a suffragist and provincial president of the Woman's Christian Temperance Union. Nellie stated that Mrs. McClung was the only woman she had met that she would like as a mother-in-law. Nellie married Mrs. McClung's son, Robert Wesley, in August 1896. They had five children between 1897 and 1911. She was involved in many local organizations, including the WCTU, the Methodist Ladies' Aid, the Epworth League, and the Home Economics Association.

== Career ==
The McClung family faced financial difficulties starting in 1905 when Wesley sold his pharmacy business. To help supplement their income, Nellie sought out paid writing work, writing short stories for magazines. She published her first novel, Sowing Seeds in Danny, in 1908. The book became a bestseller, selling 100,000 copies in Canada and the United States and making McClung $25,000 ($642,025 in 2021). With the success of her book, McClung was invited to speak at events throughout Manitoba and Saskatchewan, launching her career as a public speaker.

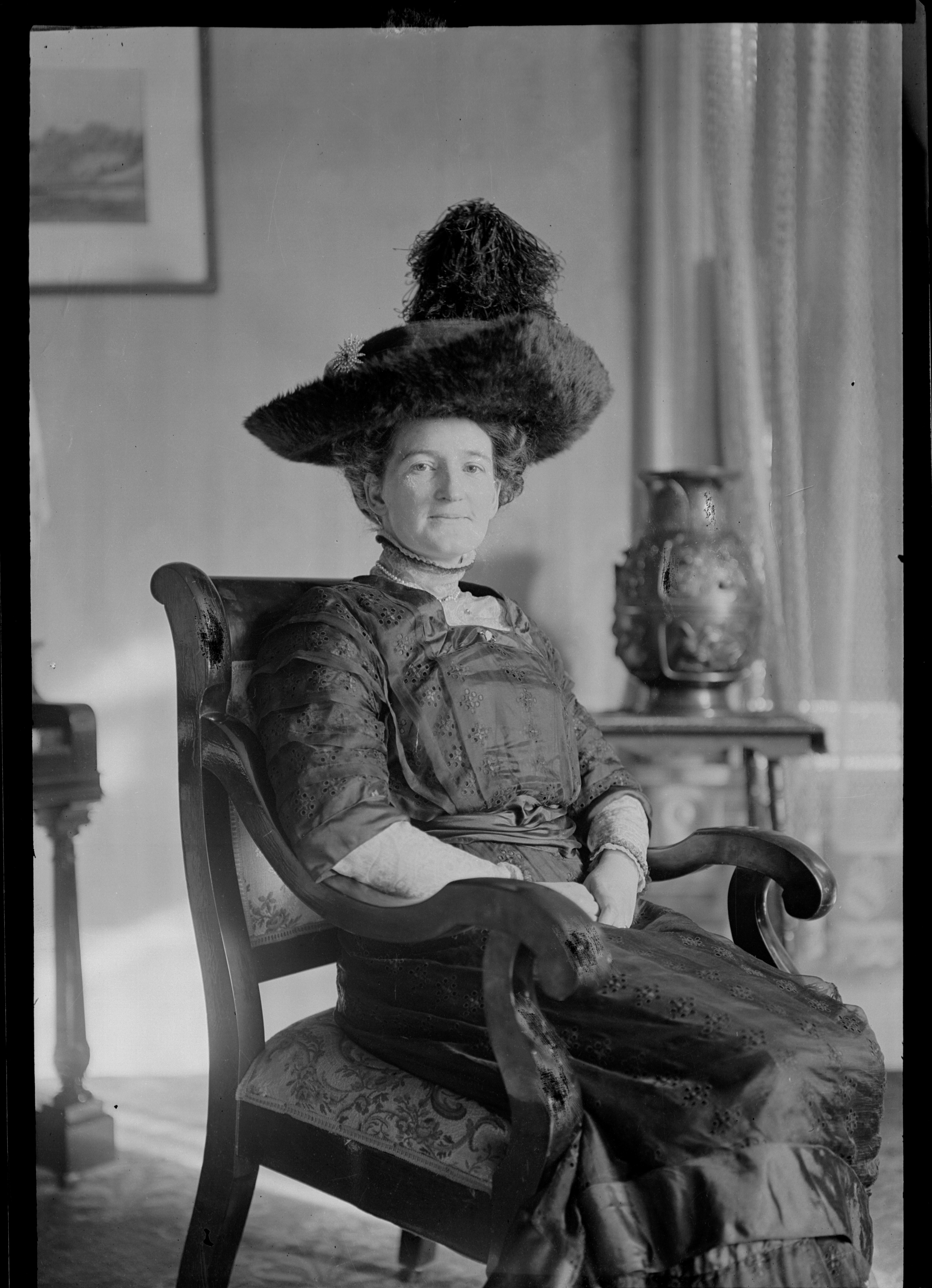
McClung in 1910

McClung's second book, A Second Chance, was published in 1910. By then, her reputation for speaking had reached Ontario, and she embarked on a tour of the province, with stops in Whitby, Hamilton, Peterborough, Kingston, Waterloo, and Toronto. Her speaking engagements were well received, with the Hamilton Herald reporting that she "took her audiences by storm". McClung would go on to write three more books throughout the 1910s, including In Times Like These, which has been regarded as an important statement of first-wave feminism. Throughout her career, McClung wrote sixteen books, including two autobiographies, and many poems, short stories, and newspaper articles.

In 1911, the McClungs moved to Winnipeg, where Wesley had been offered a position as an insurance broker. The following year, McClung and fourteen other women formed the Women's Political Equality League, an organization focused on women's suffrage. In 1914, the league petitioned the Conservative Premier of Manitoba, Rodmond Roblin, for the right of women to vote, but their request was denied. The next day, the Political Equality League staged a "Mock Parliament" at the Walker Theatre, with its members imitating government ministers. McClung had the role of Roblin, and repeated many of the arguments that the Premier had made the day before:

Man is made for something higher and better than voting... Men were made to support families... Shall I call man away from the useful plow and harrow to talk loud on street corners about things which do not concern him? Politics unsettle men, and unsettled men mean unsettled bills—broken furniture, and broken vows—and divorce... When you ask for the vote you are asking me to break up peaceful, happy homes—to wreck innocent lives.

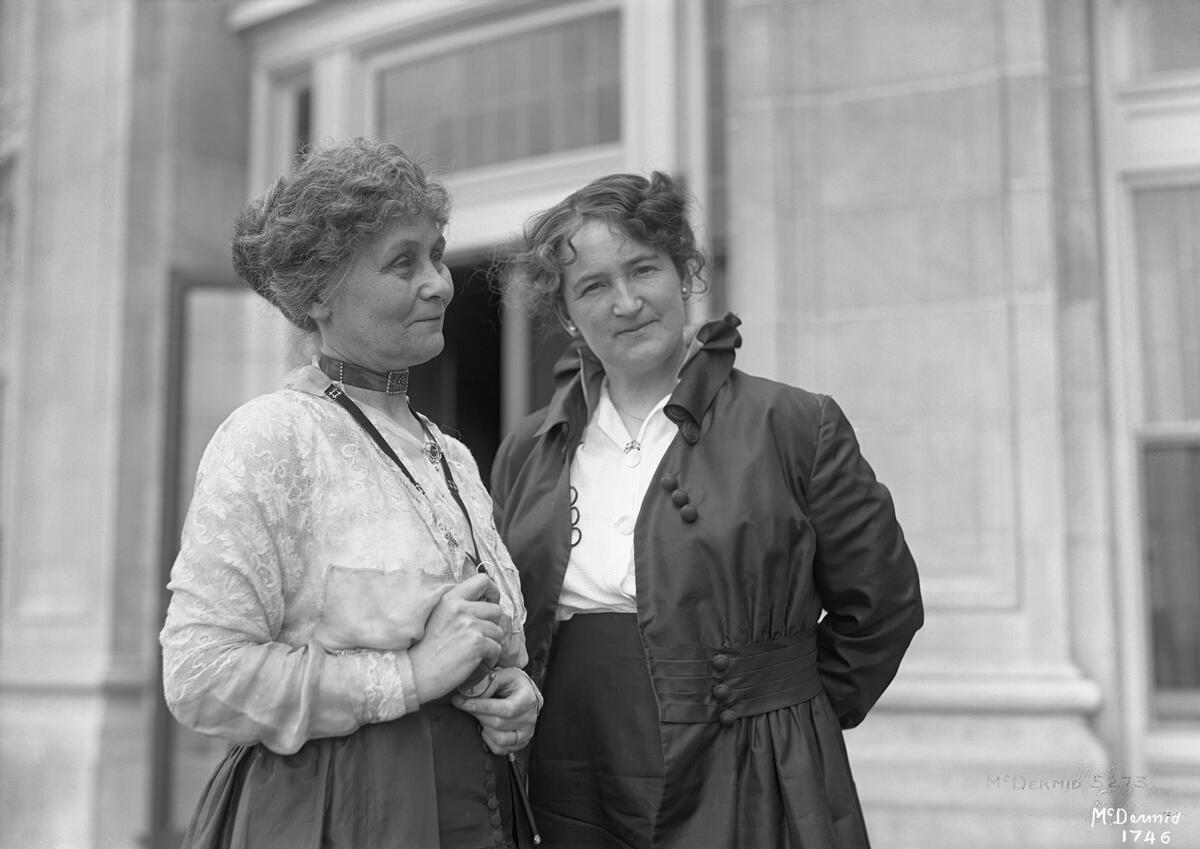
Nellie McClung with Emmeline Pankhurst in Edmonton, Alberta

McClung campaigned for the Manitoba Liberal Party in both the 1914 and 1915 general elections. The McClungs moved to Edmonton, Alberta, after Wesley was offered a promotion. The Liberal Party won the 1915 election in a landslide, and Manitoba became the first province in Canada to grant women the right to vote in January 1916 under the new Liberal government, exactly two years after the Political Equality League had petitioned Premier Roblin.

In Alberta, McClung continued to fight for temperance, healthcare, and women's rights. In the 1921 general election, she was elected to the Legislative Assembly of Alberta for the constituency of Edmonton as a member of the Liberal Party. McClung was one of two women who were elected, the other being Irene Parlby, a member of the United Farmers. The United Farmers of Alberta formed the government, with 38 out of the possible 61 seats. McClung often broke ranks with the Liberal Party to support the more socially progressive United Farmers' legislation, working with Parlby on resolutions that benefitted women. McClung ran for office again in the 1926 general election for the constituency of Calgary, but lost by 60 votes.

McClung was one of five women, along with Irene Parlby, Henrietta Muir Edwards, Emily Murphy, and Louise McKinney, who put forward a petition in 1927 to clarify the term "persons" in the British North America Act 1867, and determine the eligibility of women to serve in the Senate of Canada. The case called Edwards v Canada (also known as the Persons Case), was taken to the Supreme Court of Canada, which ruled that women were not "qualified persons" and thus were ineligible to serve in the Senate. The ruling was appealed to the Judicial Committee of the Privy Council, which at that time was Canada's highest court. In 1929, the Judicial Committee overturned the Supreme Court's decision, and the first woman, Cairine Wilson, was appointed to the Senate the following year.

McClung was appointed to the board of the Canadian Broadcasting Corporation (CBC) in 1936 by Prime Minister William Lyon Mackenzie King, the first woman to serve on its board. King invited her in 1938 to serve as a delegate to the League of Nations in Geneva. McClung felt that the League was "bogged down by purposeless disputation and empty speeches", and that many delegates cared more about getting credit than working towards a meaningful goal.

== Later life and death ==
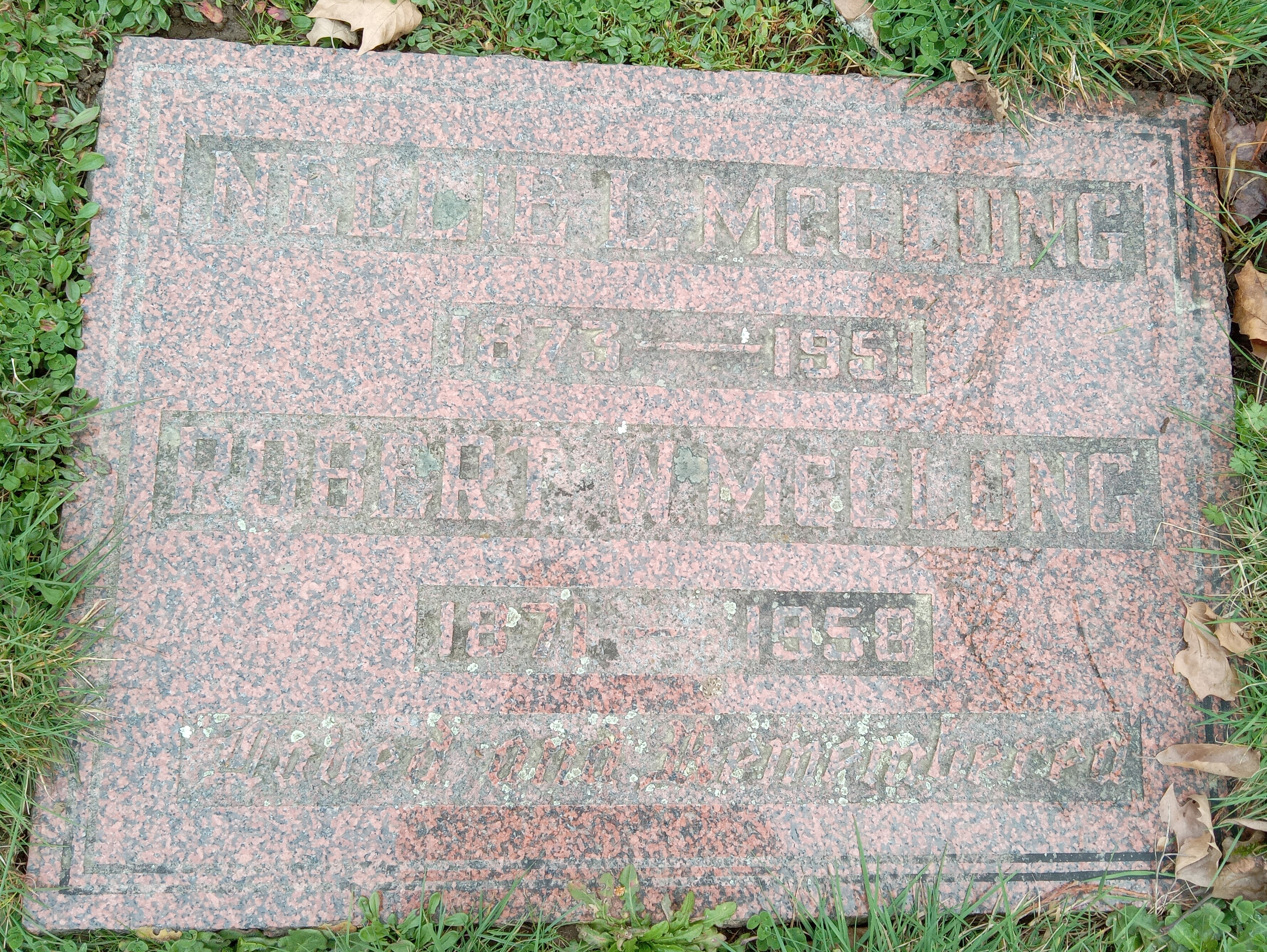
McClung's grave marker

McClung moved to Victoria, British Columbia, in 1933, where she lived for the remainder of her life. Her health deteriorated throughout the late 1930s, and she suffered a heart attack in 1940 while attending a CBC board meeting in Ottawa, which made it difficult to travel. She continued contributing to the board through correspondence until her resignation in 1942. She published the second volume of her autobiography, The Stream Runs Fast, in 1945. McClung died on 1 September 1951, at age 77, and was interred at the Royal Oak Burying Park.

== Views ==
McClung, like other members of the Famous Five, was a maternal feminist. She viewed women as "morally superior" to men and did not feel that traditional gender roles should be changed. Her book In Times Like These (1915) argued that women had a biological maternal instinct that made them better suited for politics than men, stating that "men make wounds, and women bind them up". In 1916, she called for suffrage to be granted to Canadian and English women first, though she withdrew her suggestion when Francis Marion Beynon criticized her view in the Grain Growers' Guide.

McClung was an advocate for the eugenics movement in Alberta. She supported the Sexual Sterilization Act, which allowed "mental defectives" to be sterilized without free and informed consent (sometimes without their knowledge, contributing to Canada's genocide of Indigenous people) at the recommendation of the Alberta Eugenics Board. The Act sterilized more than 2,800 people against their will and awareness from when it took effect in 1928 until it was repealed in 1972.

== Legacy ==
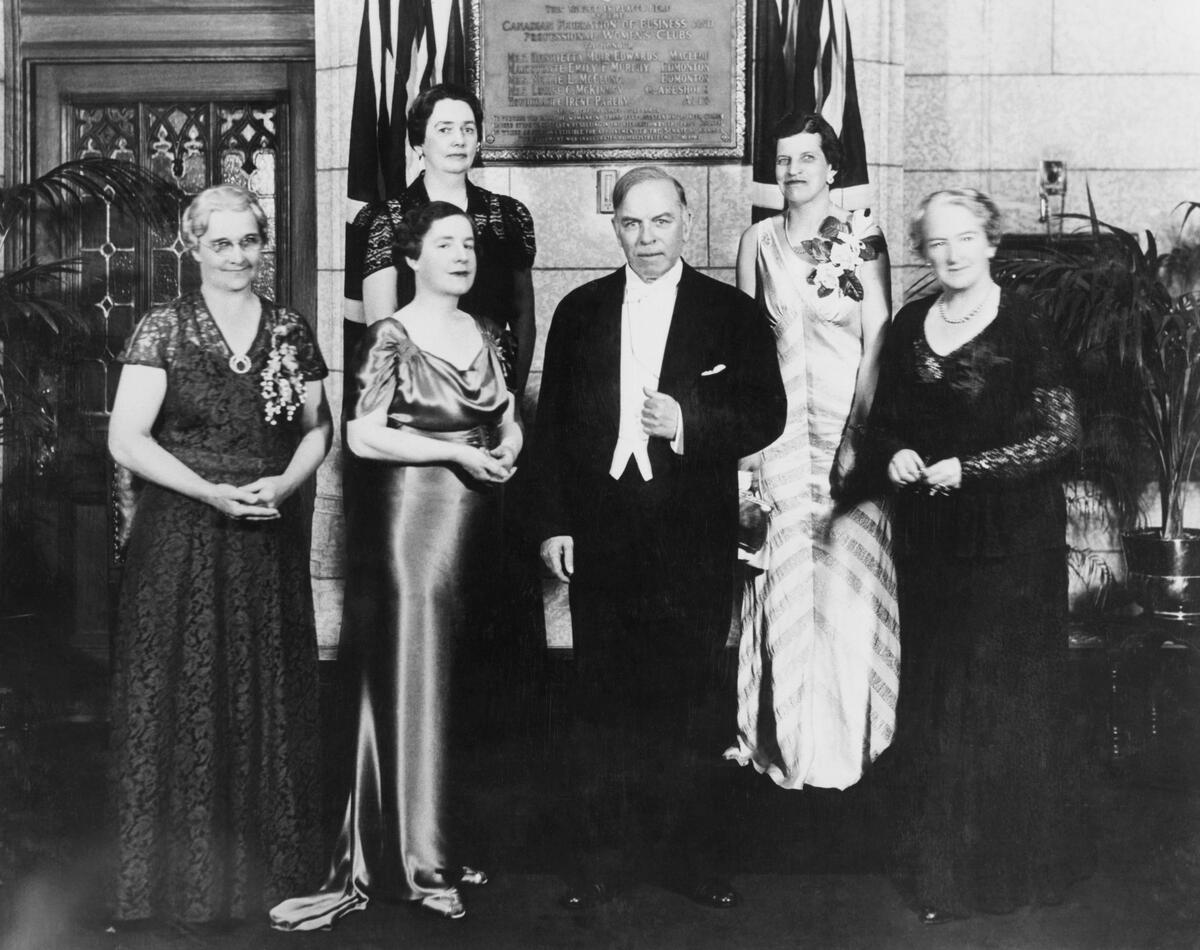
Mackenzie King unveiling plaque to the Valiant Five in the Person's Case

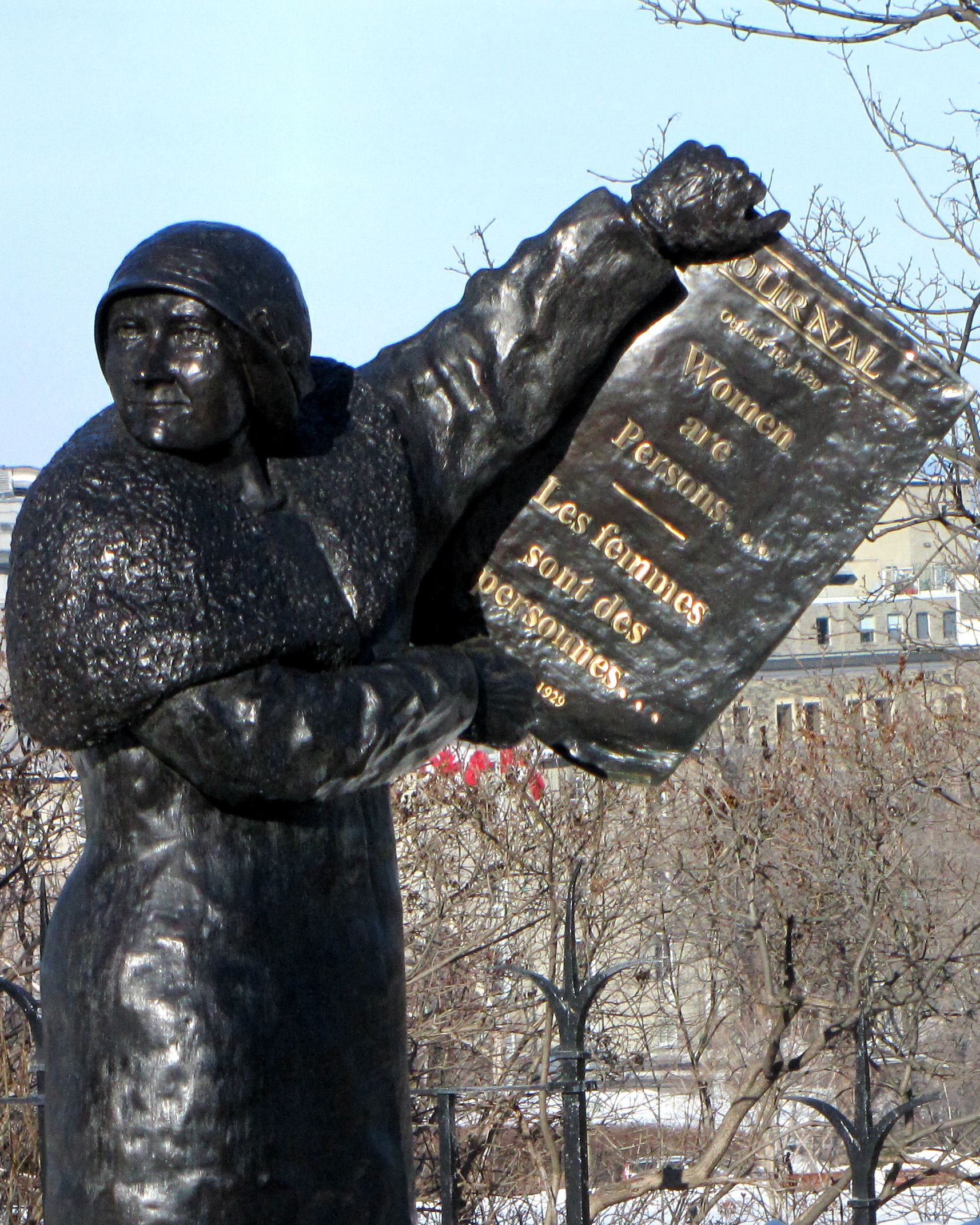
McClung in the Famous Five statue at Parliament Hill in Ottawa

In 1954, McClung was named a Person of National Historic Significance by the government of Canada. A plaque commemorating McClung is located in Chatsworth, Ontario. On 29 August 1973, McClung and the other four women who were involved in the Persons Case were honoured with an 8 cent stamp. In addition, the Persons Case was recognized as a National Historic Event in 1997. In October 2009, the Senate of Canada named Nellie McClung and the rest of the Five Canada's first "honorary senators."

McClung's house in Calgary, Alberta, her residence from 1923 to the mid-1930s, still stands and is designated a heritage site. Two other houses in which McClung lived were relocated to the Archibald Museum near La Rivière, Manitoba in the Rural Municipality of Pembina, before being moved back to Manitou in 2017 following the museum's closure. The houses are open to the public. The McClung family residence in Winnipeg is also a historic site.

== Bibliography ==
=== Fiction ===
- Sowing Seeds in Danny. Toronto: William Briggs. 1908.
- The Second Chance. New York: Doubleday, Page & Co. 1910.
- The Black Creek Stopping House: And Other Stories. Toronto: William Briggs. 1912.
- Purple Springs. Boston and New York: Houghton Mifflin. 1922.
- When Christmas Crossed 'The Peace'. Toronto: Thomas Allen. 1923.
- Painted Fires. Toronto: Thomas Allen. 1925.
- All We Like Sheep. Toronto: Thomas Allen. 1926.
- Be Good to Yourself: A Book of Short Stories. Toronto: Thomas Allen. 1930.
- Flowers for the Living. Toronto: Thomas Allen. 1931.

=== Non-fiction ===
- In Times Like These. Toronto: McLeod & Allen. 1915.
- The Next of Kin. Houghton Mifflin. 1917.
- Three Times and Out. Told by private Simmons. Boston and New York: Houghton Mifflin. 1918.
- Clearing in the West: My Own Story. Toronto: Thomas Allen. 1935.
- Leaves from Lantern Lane. Toronto: Thomas Allen. 1936.
- Before They Call ... (pamphlet). Board of Home Missions, United Church of Canada. 1937.
- More Leaves from Lantern Lane. Toronto: Thomas Allen. 1937.
- The Stream Runs Fast. Toronto: Thomas Allen. 1945.

== See also ==
- Feminism in Canada
- List of suffragists and suffragettes
- List of women's rights activists

== Sources ==
=== Print sources ===
- Davis, Marilyn; Hallett, Mary (1993). Firing the heather: the life and times of Nellie McClung. Saskatoon: Fifth House. ISBN 978-1-895-61843-3. OCLC 28024663.
- Devereux, Cecily (2006). Growing a Race: Nellie L. McClung and the Fiction of Eugenic Feminism. Montreal: McGill–Queen's University Press. ISBN 978-0-773-57304-8. OCLC 5339206989.
- Devine, Heather (2017). Finding Directions West: Readings that Locate and Dislocate Western Canada's Past. Calgary: University of Calgary Press. ISBN 978-1-552-38880-8. OCLC 968345358.
- Fiamengo, Janice (1999). "A Legacy of Ambivalence: Responses to Nellie McClung". Journal of Canadian Studies. 34 (4): 70–87. doi:10.3138/jcs.34.4.70. OCLC 5226215524. S2CID 141213949. Project MUSE 672982.
- Fiamengo, Janice (2002). "Rediscovering Our Foremothers Again: The Racial Ideas of Canada's Early Feminists, 1885-1945". Essays on Canadian Writing. 75: 85–117. eISSN 0316-0300. OCLC 5365418657. ProQuest 197247657.
- Forster, Merna (2004). 100 Canadian Heroines: Famous and Forgotten Faces. Canada: Dundurn Press. ISBN 978-1-459-71431-1. OCLC 56318568.
- Gray, Charlotte (2008). Extraordinary Canadians: Nellie McClung. Toronto: Penguin Group. ISBN 978-0-143-18367-9. OCLC 213400806.
- Hancock, Carol (1996). Nellie McClung: no small legacy. Northstone Publishing Inc. ISBN 978-1-551-45084-1. OCLC 35638938.
- MacEwan, Grant (1975). And mighty women too: stories of notable western Canadian women. Saskatoon: Western Producer Prairie Books. ISBN 978-0-919-30665-3. OCLC 2464027.
- Macpherson, Margaret (2003). Nellie McClung: voice for the voiceless. Montreal: XYZ Publishing. ISBN 978-1-894-85204-3. OCLC 288125189.
- McLaren, Angus (1990). Our own master race: eugenics in Canada, 1885-1945. Toronto: McClelland & Stewart. ISBN 978-0-771-05544-7. OCLC 904376856.
- Millar, Nancy (1999). The famous five: Emily Murphy and the case of the missing persons. Cochrane: The Western Heritage Centre. ISBN 978-0-968-59620-3. OCLC 45224169.
- Savage, Candace (2014). Our Nell: a scrapbook biography of Nellie L. McClung. Halifax: Formac Publishing Company Limited. ISBN 978-1-459-50317-5. OCLC 6257956.
- Sharpe, Robert; McMahon, Patricia (2007). The Persons Case: The Origins and Legacy of the Fight for Legal Personhood. University of Toronto Press. ISBN 978-1-442-68498-0. OCLC 743371175.
- Sharpe, Sydney (1994). The gilded ghetto: women and political power in Canada. Toronto: HarperCollins. ISBN 978-0-002-55276-9. OCLC 30073048.

=== Web sources ===
- "McClung, Nellie Mooney National Historic Person". Parks Canada. Archived from the original on 29 September 2022.
- "Nellie Letitia (Mooney) McClung - Celebrating Women's Achievements". Library and Archives Canada. 2 October 2000. Archived from the original on 24 November 2019.
- "Persons Case National Historic Event". Directory of Federal Heritage Designations. Archived from the original on 29 September 2022.
- Yang, Jennifer (12 October 2009). "'Famous Five' named honorary senators". Toronto Star. Archived from the original on 29 September 2022.
- "Nellie McClung House". Canadian Register of Historic Places. Archived from the original on 22 September 2021.
- Redekop, Bill (7 September 2017). "Home, at last". Winnipeg Free Press. Archived from the original on 20 August 2022.
- "Historic Sites of Manitoba: McClung House (97 Chestnut Street, Winnipeg)". Manitoba Historical Society. Archived from the original on 3 February 2021.
- White, Patrick (23 April 2010). "Human-rights lawyer opposes honour for right-to-vote pioneer Nellie McClung". The Globe and Mail. Archived from the original on 30 October 2021.
- Adam, Mohammed (27 October 2016). "Adam: Monuments and mythology – let's not sanitize the past of famous Canadians". Ottawa Citizen. Archived from the original on 25 September 2021.
