= Marjorie Paxson =

American journalist and editor (1923–2017)

- Paxson c. 1950s
- Born: August 13, 1923; Houston, Texas, US
- Died: June 17, 2017 (aged 93)
- Occupations: Publisher; editor; journalist
- Years active: 1944–1986

Marjorie Paxson (August 13, 1923 – June 17, 2017) was an American newspaper journalist, editor, and publisher during an era in American history when the women's liberation movement was setting milestones by tackling the barriers of discrimination in the media workplace. Paxson graduated from the University of Missouri School of Journalism in 1944, and began her newspaper career in Nebraska during World War II, covering hard news for wire services. In the 1960s, Paxson worked as assistant editor under Marie Anderson for the women's page of the Miami Herald which, in the 1950s, was considered one of the top women's sections in the United States. From 1963 to 1967, she was president of Theta Sigma Phi, a sorority that evolved into the Association for Women in Communications (AWC). She won the organization's Lifetime Achievement Award and was inducted into its hall of fame. In 1969, she earned a Penney-Missouri award for her work as editor of the women's page in the St. Petersburg Times.

Throughout her career, Paxson advocated for working women and for women in journalism. She worked at several different newspapers for different reasons that ranged from being replaced by men returning from the war, to seizing opportunities that afforded her the ability to make positive hard news changes to the women's section. She experienced two demotions as newspapers changed their women's sections into features sections and replaced female editors with male editors. She expressed bitterness over her demotions and attributed them partially to the women's movement. She believed feminist activists unfairly denigrated women's pages and their editors, who she believed had been supporters of the movement.

Paxson worked as editor of women's pages in Houston, Miami, Philadelphia; and in Boise, Idaho, as an assistant managing editor. While working as women's page editor for the Philadelphia Bulletin, she took a five-week leave of absence to edit Xilonen, the daily newspaper of the 1975 United Nations World Conference for International Women's Year in Mexico City. She considered her time there to be the most important work of her career. As a result of that work, she was honored with the AWC's Headliner Award. She helped create the National Women and Media Collection, which documents media coverage of and by women in the United States. She was one of four women's page journalists selected to participate in the Washington Press Foundation's Women in Journalism Oral History Project. After more than four decades of working to reshape the definition of women's news, Paxson finished her career as a newspaper publisher in Oklahoma.

== Early life ==
Marjorie Bowers Paxson was born August 13, 1923, in Houston, Texas, to Roland B. and Marie Margaret (Bowers) Paxson, who had moved to Houston from Lancaster, Pennsylvania, where both had grown up. She had one younger brother, John. Her father was a petroleum geologist and her mother had attended a secretarial school but discontinued working after she married. According to Paxson, as children she and her brother visited the derrick floors on the oil fields her father worked, but when she got to high school age she was no longer allowed on the derrick floors because while children were welcome, women were not.

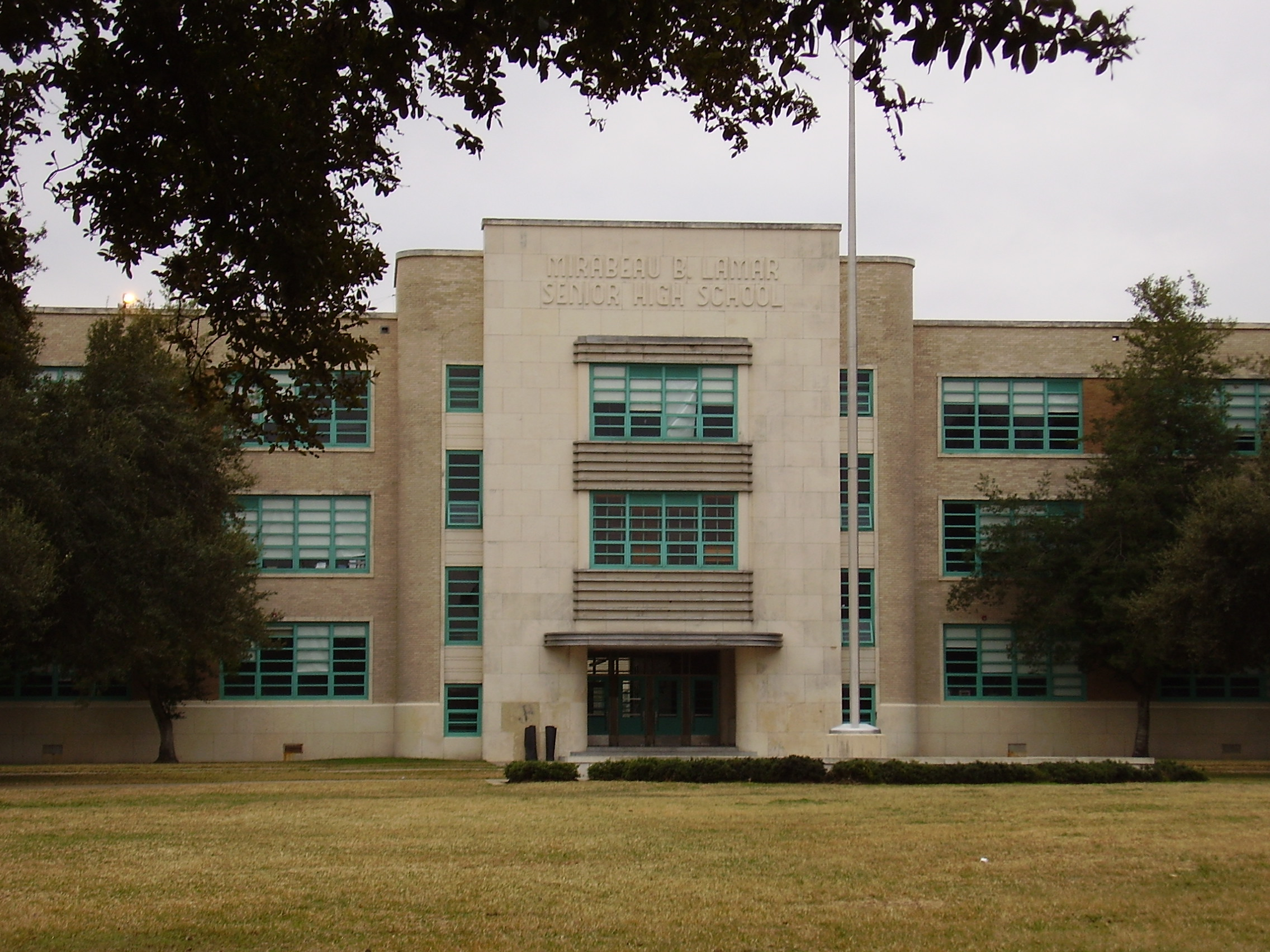
Lamar High School in Houston

Paxson attended Lamar High School in Houston's Upper Kirby district. She was uninterested in nursing or teaching, then the most common professions open to women, and became involved in journalism while taking a class in high school and writing for her school's newspaper. Her journalism teacher had graduated from the University of Missouri School of Journalism, and Paxson decided she wanted to go to the school he had attended.

Paxson's parents aspired to a college education for both their children. In accordance with her parents' wishes that she attend her first two years of college close to home, she applied to Rice University, which was only a mile away. She was concerned about whether she would get into Rice, which at the time limited its freshman class to ten percent women. She was admitted and under an endowment attended tuition-free; she recalled her family paying $200 per year for her to attend Rice. While at Rice she worked on the student newspaper, The Thresher.

In 1942 Paxson transferred to the University of Missouri for her junior year; within a few weeks, most of her male classmates were drafted for World War II. During her time at the university, the dean of the school of journalism was Frank Luther Mott, whom she admired but thought of as "sort of a stuffy character" until on New Year's Day during class he staged an attempted murder of himself, giving the class the assignment to write about the incident. She worked for the university's student newspaper, Columbia Missourian, and graduated from its journalism school in 1944.

== Career ==
After graduating from college Paxson considered joining the military but ultimately decided to look for a job in journalism. She credited her work at the Columbia Missourian with helping her get her first job at United Press International (UPI) wire service.

=== Wire services ===
Like many women in the United States, during World War II Paxson was considered for jobs previously limited to men. Starting in 1944 she covered hard news for the wire services, first for UPI in the two-person Lincoln, Nebraska, bureau for $25 a week. This represented equal pay because it was covered by the American Newspaper Guild contract. With the men away fighting, one in five of UPI's employees was a woman. Paxson and the Lincoln bureau manager, Marguerite Davis, reported all state news with the exception of football games, as women were excluded from Nebraska Stadium's press box, and executions, which the state bureau chief, Gaylord Godwin, considered inappropriate for coverage by women. While covering the Nebraska Supreme Court, Paxson experienced sexual harassment by the court clerk. She later recalled this as a common issue for working women, and that her strategy was to keep visits to his office brief, keep the desk between them, and "if he started to come around the desk, you picked up those opinions and left."

Paxson worked for UPI for two years, until 1946. Having signed a waiver agreeing to quit when the war was over, she learned was losing her job. The week she was fired she moved to the Associated Press (AP), in Omaha, Nebraska, to edit radio wire copy for $55 a week. She worked for the AP for two years, then in 1948 moved back to Texas, where she started working in women's pages, which were the only journalism positions open to most women both before and after the war.

=== Editor ===
Paxson was hired in 1948 at age 25 as the society editor for the Houston Post, then considered more progressive than the Houston Chronicle, its primary competitor. She was one of a staff of five in the women's section and earned a salary of $75 per week. Houston's oil-boom economy meant she needed to cover many high-profile social events. Paxson recalled that during this period she had 14 evening dresses, most of them sewn by her mother. On a typical Friday she worked all day, covered a party in the evening, returned to the office to file a piece on the event, and got home at 3:00 in the morning. During her time in Houston Paxson lived with her parents, as her parents believed a single woman should not be living in an apartment.

Paxson was promoted from society editor to women's page editor in 1951. She attempted to cover hard news but was told by the news editor that he would never allow a news story to be covered in the women's section. She moved pictures of brides off the women's section's front page, where most newspapers always ran them, in favor of issue-oriented stories; she later recalled accomplishing this in late 1951 or early 1952. She considered this one of her major accomplishments at the paper; at one point she had to explain to the paper's de facto publisher, Oveta Culp Hobby, that she would not run a wedding photo of the daughter of one of Hobby's friends on the front of the section. Paxson said that once she had been given the explanation, Hobby backed Paxson up. She later recalled the strict order of ranking based on family social prominence used to determine how much column space a wedding announcement was given; the most prominent brides received two columns and the least prominent were covered three in two columns.

In 1952 Paxson became women's editor at the Houston Chronicle for $100 a week, but while she supervised a staff of seven, she was not given hiring and firing authority. While at the Chronicle she published the first photos of black brides in a major Houston newspaper and convinced her managing editor to take a chance on the then little-known advice columnist Ann Landers. By the mid-1950s she began covering issues affecting working women and other serious news.

Paxson was hired as a copy editor in 1956 by Dorothy Jurney, the women's page editor for the Miami Herald, then considered one of the top women's sections in the country. She was mentored in her new position by Jurney and assistant women's editor Marie Anderson and worked alongside Roberta Applegate and Jeanne Voltz. The department's managing editors included Al Neuharth and Lee Hills. When Jurney moved to the Detroit Free Press in 1959, Anderson took her place as women's page editor and Paxson was promoted to assistant women's editor. Over the next several years they campaigned to include stories on women's issues such as birth control and the women's movement. During Anderson and Paxson's tenure, the women's section of the Herald won so many Penney-Missouri Awards, widely seen as the highest awards for women's page journalism, that the organizers asked the paper to retire from the competition. Paxson worked at the Herald for 12 years; her ending salary was $9,000 per year.

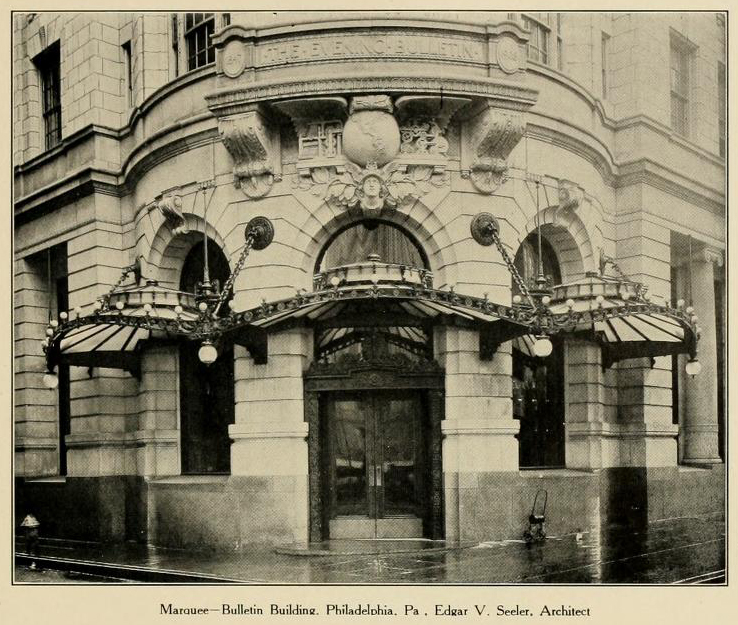
Philadelphia Bulletin building

Paxson moved to the St. Petersburg Times, known for its progressive content, to become its women's editor in 1968 at a salary of $13,000 per year. Although she had a staff of seven, all women, she could not make hiring, firing, or budget decisions; this was common among women's page editors during this period. In 1970, following the lead of other major newspapers which were changing their women's sections into features sections, the paper eliminated their women's section, and Paxson was demoted to assistant features editor. Shortly thereafter she learned she had won a 1969 Penney-Missouri Award for her work on the paper's then-defunct women's section. This was an embarrassment to the paper's management, and when shortly thereafter they discovered she was looking for a new job, they fired her. She was hired as women's page editor by the Philadelphia Bulletin the same year, with a staff of 15. In 1973 the paper eliminated its women's section in favor of a features section, and Paxson was again demoted. She was made associate editor of the paper's Sunday magazine, where her assigned tasks were primarily reading page proofs. Paxson called the time she spent on the magazine "the worst fourteen months of my life." She was made assistant metropolitan editor in 1974, with a staff of 18 but still no personnel authority or budget control. When faced with a decision whether to send a fashion editor to Paris, she told her manager she could make a better decision if she knew the department's budget. His response was, "Aren't you glad you don't have to worry your pretty head about things like that?"

While Paxson was working at the Bulletin, she took a five-week leave of absence to edit Xilonen, the daily newspaper of the 1975 United Nations World Conference for International Women's Year in Mexico City, hiring a staff of six as reporters. At Xilonen, she edited the work of influential writers such as Germain Greer. Paxson later called it the most important thing she had ever done; it earned her a Headliner Award from the AWC. When she returned to work, she wrote a four-part series about the conference which ran in multiple newspapers across the country but not in the Bulletin. Paxson viewed this as the writing on the wall and started a job search. She reached out to Neuharth, then the head of Gannett, who had increased the company's focus on promoting women and minorities. He brought her to their headquarters in Rochester for interviews. While waiting for an opening she became frustrated with the deteriorating situation at the Bulletin and in 1976 quit; her ending salary was $22,000. Paxson then joined Jurney and Jill Ruckelshaus to work on the official report of the third Commission on the Status of Women.

Paxson moved to Gannett's Idaho Statesman, a 60,000-circulation paper in Boise, in 1976 to become assistant managing editor. She helped prepare the news room budget and earned the same salary Gannett would have paid a man. She worked at the Statesman for 18 months.

=== Publisher ===
Paxson moved to the Public Opinion in Chambersburg, Pennsylvania, in 1978 to become the paper's publisher. She was the fourth female publisher of a daily paper in the Gannett media conglomerate. She had budget responsibility for five departments. She recalled that the first time she had to fire someone, "It was a totally new experience for me because I had never had the authority to fire anybody up to this point." She had a habit of bringing her miniature dachshund, Tiger, to the office with her. When her mother expressed doubt, asking "What will they think?", Paxson told her, "Mom, I am 'they'."

Paxson worked at the Public Opinion for a little under three years and while there accepted a three-week position as associate editor for the daily newspaper of the 1980 United Nations Mid-Decade Conference for Women in Copenhagen. She worked with executive editor John Rowley, whom she described as "display[ing] little understanding of women's issues". Paxson ultimately thought the conference newspaper was demeaning to women, and she wasn't proud of working on it.

In 1980 Paxson became publisher of the Muskogee Phoenix in Muskogee, Oklahoma. The outgoing publisher, Tams Bixby III, had sold the newspaper to Gannett after three generations of his family running it, and he had decided to retire. Paxson recalled learning that some on the staff were unhappy that the newspaper's publisher was going to be "one of Gannett's token women." During her tenure she changed the paper's stance on the Equal Rights Amendment from opposing to supporting.

Paxson held the position of publisher until her retirement in 1986 at the age of 63 after 42 years working in newspapers. Her ending salary was over six figures, including stock options. After she retired she wrote a weekly column for the Phoenix called "Nobody Asked Me But..." which focused on local issues, daily life, and her travels.

== Theta Sigma Phi ==
Paxson was elected president of Theta Sigma Phi in 1963 while working at the Miami Herald and held that office until 1967. During her tenure she transformed the organization from a social group into a professional association. The group had been founded in 1908 as a sorority for journalism students and was the de facto professional association for women journalists, who were not accepted into the Society of Professional Journalists. Paxson campaigned for a more professional approach, a stance which was not popular with all members, many of whom disagreed with her emphasis on education and training. She led the group to establish a headquarters in Austin, Texas; previously the organization's files had been stored in the national secretary's garage. She also lobbied to change the name from the Greek symbols to Women in Communications, which she considered a more businesslike title; the name change ultimately occurred after her time in office ended.

== Views and advocacy ==
Paxson advocated for working women; in 1966, she advised other women's page editors to "stop downgrading women executives." She and Edee Greene, women's editor of the Fort Lauderdale News, advised other editors not to include sentences such as "although Edee Greene is a champion stock car driver, president of the Florida women's press club and women's editor of the Fort Lauderdale News, she still finds time to be a wife and mother." They argued that no journalist would feel the need to explain about a man that, while successful in various ways, he was still able to be a husband and father.

Newsrooms began in the 1960s to reflect changes wrought by the women's movement, and women made progress in obtaining jobs formerly open only to men. Paxson commented on the remaining resistance to the increasing role of women in journalism, writing in 1967 that "most city editors are men, and there is an inborn prejudice against sending a woman on certain kinds of stories." While working as women's editor for the Philadelphia Bulletin, she wrote a memorandum to the publisher criticizing the paper's coverage of news of importance to women, writing, "It seems to me that unless women are wives, mothers, entertainers—and I include beauty queens in that category—or freaks, the Bulletin does not admit that they exist."

On her first day at the Muskogee Phoenix, Paxson was informed by the former publisher that he had had a policy against women wearing pants. She arrived for her second day of work the next morning wearing a pantsuit and walked through the press room, the composing room, and the news room before heading to her office. She then called a meeting of department heads to announce an official change in the dress code. The next day, 29 of the 45 women working for the newspaper arrived to work in pantsuits. Also at the Phoenix, she discovered the paper had three consistent editorial stances: in favor of alcohol by the drink (then illegal in Muskogee), in support of horse racing, and against the Equal Rights Amendment. She had no issues with the first two but of the third told the staff, "That's going to change."

Paxson was angered by what she saw as a betrayal of women's page editors by feminist leaders. She saw these editors as supporters of the movement, as the women's sections had been the only section of most newspapers to provide coverage in the movement's early years; The New York Times placed the 1965 announcement of the formation of the National Organization for Women between an article about Saks Fifth Avenue and a recipe for turkey stuffing. Leaders of the movement condemned the very idea of a so-called "women's section" as segregation by sex; they wanted news of interest to women to be covered in the news sections and, according to Paxson, saw women's page editors as traitors. In 1983 she wrote,

I still have not quite forgiven women's movement activists for turning against women's editors. In the early days of the movement in the 1960s, most substantive newspaper coverage of the movement was on the women's pages. I considered myself a part of the movement and so did women's editors I knew across the country."

As the feminist movement developed mainstream support, women's pages began to be viewed as anachronistic. At a time when many women's pages were steadily increasing their coverage of hard news, many newspapers decided to eliminate the sections in favor of features sections, and often hired men to manage those sections. The women's page editors were often demoted or fired. Paxson was twice demoted when her paper replaced its women's section, first at the St. Petersburg Times and later at the Philadelphia Bulletin; both times, a man was made editor of the new section. Paxson once described her own firing and demotion to a group of other professional women, one of whom commented, "Marj, you have to accept the fact that you're a casualty of the women's movement", an opinion with which Paxson said she agreed. She wrote in 1983 that when newspapers changed "women's sections to general interest feature sections, women's editors paid the price. We were not considered capable of directing this new kind of features section. That was man's work."

== Awards ==
Paxson won a 1969 Penney-Missouri Award, often described as the "Pulitzer Prize of feature writing", for General Excellence at the St. Petersburg Times; an AWC Headliner Award for her work on Xilonen in 1975; and an AWC Lifetime Achievement Award in 2001. She was inducted into the association's Hall of Fame in 2003. In 2020 she was posthumously inducted into the Oklahoma Journalism Hall of Fame.

== Death and legacy ==
Paxson donated her papers and $50,000 to the University of Missouri to create the National Women and Media Collection, which documents media coverage by, about and for women in the United States, in 1986, the year of her retirement. The collection is held in the Western Historical Manuscripts Collection by the State Historical Society of Missouri. She was selected in 1989 to participate in the Washington Press Foundation's Women in Journalism Oral History Project, one of four women's page journalists to be included in a group of over 60 interviewees. The others were Anderson, Jurney, and Vivian Castleberry.

According to journalism researcher Jan Whitt, Paxson "changed the concept of women's pages in Houston and Miami." She died on June 17, 2017, and was buried in Muskogee's Greenhill Cemetery. She never married and had no children.
