= Dorothy Misener Jurney =

American journalist

Dorothy Jurney
- Jurney in 1956
- Born: Dorothy Louise Misener; May 8, 1909; Michigan City, Indiana, US
- Died: June 19, 2002 (aged 93); St. Petersburg, Florida, US
- Education: Northwestern University
- Occupations: Journalist, editor
- Years active: 1930–1975
- Employer(s): Post Tribune, Miami Herald, Detroit Free Press

Dorothy Misener Jurney (May 8, 1909 – June 19, 2002) was an American journalist. As women's page editor for the Miami Herald, she shifted the focus of those pages from the "Four F's – family, food, fashion, and furnishings" – to focus on covering women's issues as hard news, and influenced other newspapers to follow suit. The National Press Club Foundation called her "the godmother of women's pages".

== Early life ==
Dorothy Louise Misener was born on May 8, 1909, in Michigan City, Indiana, to Zeola Hershey Misener, a suffragist who was in 1929 one of the first women to be elected to the Indiana General Assembly, and Herbert Roy Misener, who published the Michigan City News. She had one sibling, a younger brother named Richard Hershey.

Jurney graduated high school in 1926, attended Western College for Women for two years, then graduated from the Medill School of Journalism at Northwestern University in 1930 with a degree in journalism and an emphasis in economics.

== Career ==
After working in her father's newspaper as a feature editor, Jurney became editor of the women's page for the Gary Post-Tribune in 1939. After her marriage in 1940, her husband accepted a job in Panama, and despite his preference that she not work, she took a job as assistant to the Press Representative of the Panama Canal. In 1940 the Jurneys moved to Miami and Jurney became assistant women's page editor for The Miami News.

Another career move by her husband to Washington, D.C. during World War II resulted in Jurney, like many women of the era who took on jobs formerly considered "man's work", getting a job as city editor for the Washington Daily News in 1944. The editor who hired her later wrote that he had done so reluctantly because he had "an antipathy toward women in news shops." When World War II ended, Jurney was asked by her management, again like most World War II women journalists who had been working outside the women's page, to take a demotion and to train her male replacement. She described her editor telling her "he had a young man coming back who had been a writer but not an editor and would I teach him the job? I tried for a month; he wasn't smart, and I got tired of it and quit."

She returned to her former position as assistant women's page editor for The Miami News. In 1946 Marie Anderson joined the department, and Jurney became her mentor.

=== Miami Herald ===
In 1949 Jurney moved to the Miami Herald and became women's page editor, there "stretch(ing) the definition of women's news for a decade". Informed by her time during World War II working in a news section, Jurney worked to recreate the women's section into something beyond the "Four F's – family, food, fashion, and furnishings." She hired Anderson as her assistant editor and later hired Roberta Applegate, Jeanne Voltz, Marjorie Paxson, and Eleanor Ratelle into the department. During this period women's page editors from other papers often visited to observe her techniques.

While at the Herald Jurney and Applegate held annual workshops for area women's club leaders, attracting up to 750 at a time. They encouraged clubs to upgrade their programs to earn coverage and held contests for the best projects. These workshops and contests changed the primary focus of area women's clubs from social-event organizing to cause-related fundraising. A then-president of the Dade County Federation of Women's Clubs said, "Projects entered in the contest are an inspiration to other clubs."

In the early 1950s Jurney ran stories about the Kinsey Reports, commenting that female readers seemed to be "less squeamish" than men about sexuality being discussed in the newspaper, and about childbirth, which won Penney-Missouri Awards and encouraged other women's sections to follow suit. Jurney later said "back in the 1950s, male editors didn't give a whit what we 'girls' put in the section...it was all filler to them. But some of us women editors thought differently" and started covering issues they thought women should know about.

Also in the 1950s, at a time when the news desk ignored such stories, Jurney ran stories in the women's section about issues in the black community such as housing; she said later that she had attempted to cover the civil rights movement but that "management did not want such news" in the women's pages. In 1962 her section ran a series by Applegate on blacks in Miami that was picked up by newspapers across the country.

In January 1956 Jurney wrote an article for the American Society of Newspaper Editors urging women's page editors to cover "home and health" stories from a hard news perspective, saying "the home beat should be no different fundamentally than the police beat". That same year, after she had spoken at the American Press Institute, API's director J. Montgomery Curtis said she had done "the best work on women's interests and women's pages ever done" at the institute.

=== Detroit Free Press ===
In 1959 Jurney, who had "gained a national reputation for creating strong women's sections," and now separated from her husband, moved to the Detroit Free Press as women's page editor. She later described how in that year she had volunteered to "cover events and relieve her male colleagues and editors of work, as a strategy for successfully expanding the scope of her section." Under her leadership the Free Press's women's section ran lifestyle stories at a time when few women's sections did so and was considered "a news section" by management.

Speaking at the 1960 Associated Press Managing Editors annual convention, Jurney told managing editors to encourage women's page editors to reach out to women who were not part of the club-women community, women who – unlike the managing editors' wives – had lives and priorities "far different from your wife with her committees, the Girl Scouts, the charity drives, the Red Cross, the concerts and the library."

During her time as women's page editor at the Free Press, Lee Hills, then the paper's publisher, once introduced her as "our women's editor, and if she were a man, she'd be the executive editor. In 1973 she was promoted to assistant managing editor. She joined the Associated Press Managing Editors organization and was that organization's first female board member.

In 1973 Jurney moved to The Philadelphia Inquirer to become assistant managing editor, and in 1975 she retired. After retiring, she was a member of the National Commission on the Observance of International Women's Year from 1975 to 1979. In 1977 she worked on the National Women's Conference. She founded an editorial talent search firm. From 1977 to 1986 she did a study of women in journalism management, publishing her results in the Bulletin of the American Society of Newspaper Editors. She worked with the Women's Study Program and Policy Center at George Washington University, analyzing reporting of women's issues. In 1983 her results were published in New Directions for News. She served as a board member of New Directions for News, a University of Missouri School of Journalism think tank.

== Legacy ==
Jurney was one of four women's page journalists chosen for inclusion in the Women in Journalism oral history project conducted by the National Press Club Foundation, who called her "the godmother of women's pages" because of her progressive approach and work to build a community of women journalists. Kimberly Wilmot Voss in Re-evaluating Women's Page Journalism in the Post World War II Era called her "likely the most influential of all women's page editors." The other women's page journalists selected to participate were Anderson, Paxson, and Vivian Castleberry.

In We Are Our Mothers' Daughters (2000) Cokie Roberts wrote that "Jurney and her contemporaries used the women's pages to underline women's problems."

Jurney's papers are held by the State Historical Society of Missouri.

== Personal life ==
Jurney married Frank J. Jurney in 1940. They were legally separated in 1959. She died in St. Petersburg, Florida, on June 19, 2002.

== Awards ==
- Florida Press Club award for general excellence in women's news (six times)
- National Headliner of Women in Communications
- University of Missouri Distinguished Service to Journalism Award
