= Roberta Applegate =

American reporter and professor

Roberta G. Applegate
- Born: June 5, 1919; Buhl, Idaho, U.S.
- Died: June 24, 1990 (aged 71); Manhattan, Kansas, U.S.
- Education: Michigan State University (BA); Northwestern University (MS)
- Occupations: Reporter, journalism professor
- Known for: First woman to report on Michigan state legislature for the Associated Press

Roberta G. Applegate (June 5, 1919 – June 24, 1990) was an American reporter and journalism professor.

== Early life ==
Applegate was born on June 5, 1919, in Buhl, Idaho. Her mother was Grace Applegate (née Robinson) and her father was Albert A. Applegate, a reporter at the Idaho Statesman and the head professor at the Michigan State University School of Journalism. She often went to work with her father at the newsroom and on field trips with his university classes from a young age. In high school, she was unsure about journalism as a career as she did not want to work as a sob sister or society editor like most female journalists at the time, but she still served as editor of her school paper.

She attended Michigan State University, where she studied German and French due to her father's position in the journalism department, although she still worked as a writer, music critic and women's editor for the campus paper, the Michigan State News. After graduating in 1940 with her bachelor of arts degree, she immediately began work with the Lansing State Journal as a feature writer.

== Career ==
Applegate spent a year with the Lansing State Journal, before receiving her masters of science degree from Northwestern University in 1942, where she was on scholarship. She then began working at the Detroit Free Press as the women's club editor for eight months. As many men were serving overseas during World War II, she had the opportunity to take a "durational appointment" with the Associated Press (AP); she became the second woman to work at its office in Detroit in May 1943. Although not all of the male journalists welcomed her, she found allies in her editor, G. Milton Kelly, and the Bureau Chief, Ted Smits. She transferred to the AP office in Lansing, where she became the first woman to report on the state legislature, executive and judiciary. Applegate enjoyed working at the capitol, although Governor Murray Van Wagoner was often visibly uncomfortable swearing in front of her. Her male colleagues occasionally removed the "a" from her name, assuming that the correct byline was Robert Applegate.

She applied for the Nieman Foundation fellowship in 1946 but was unsuccessful as the curator preferred to give preference to veterans and war correspondents. The following year, she was asked by Governor Kim Sigler to be his press secretary, after he noticed her court reporting while he was serving as the special grand jury prosecutor. She accepted the job without being asked her political affiliation, although she later learned that she could have had the opportunity to lead the Lansing bureau at AP. Applegate was the first female press secretary for the governor of Michigan although she returned to journalism when Sigler was not re-elected.

In 1950, she became the women's club editor at the Miami Herald, where she worked with a number of prominent women's editors, including Dorothy Misener Jurney, Marie Anderson and Marjorie Paxson. Applegate began working as a feature writer, where she conducted interviews with public figures including Judy Garland, Richard Nixon and Madame Chaing Kai-shek. She also wrote articles about mental illness in children, widows and a state nursing shortage in the 1950s. She wrote a popular series of articles on the local African American community, for which she won a number of Florida Women's Press Association Club awards.

She left the Miami Herald in 1964 to join Kansas State University as an associate professor in technical journalism, as she became frustrated with the Herald and with Florida. She taught classes about reporting, magazine writing and media law, being promoted to associate professor of journalism and mass communications in 1974. Applegate set up a chapter of Theta Sigma Phi at the university and was the vice president between 1970 and 1972. She was also president of the Kansas Press Women between 1975 and 1976 and chair of the Association for Education in Journalism and Mass Communication's magazine division. She received Michigan State University's Distinguished Alumni Award in 1976, the Matrix Honor Award for Distinguished Journalistic Achievement in 1979 and was the Kansas Press Woman of the Year in 1985. Applegate retired from the university in 1988.

== Death and legacy ==
She died on June 24, 1990, in Manhattan, Kansas, from cancer. She was inducted in the Michigan Journalism Hall of Fame in 2008. Her papers are held by the University of Missouri in its National Women and Media Collection.
