= Vijaya Gadde =

American business executive (born 1974)

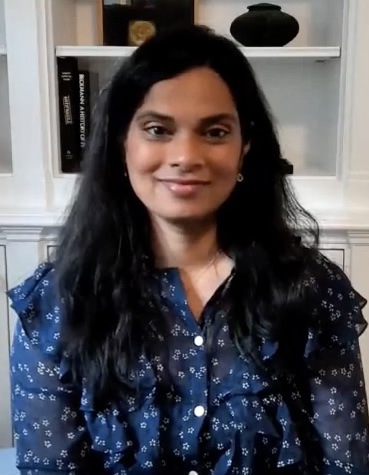
- Gadde in 2021
- Born: 1974 (age 51–52); India
- Education: Cornell University (BS); New York University (JD)
- Occupation: Attorney

Vijaya Gadde (born 1974) is an American attorney, who served as general counsel and the head of legal, policy, and trust at Twitter. Her role included handling issues such as harassment, misinformation, and harmful speech, and other decisions made by Twitter. On October 27, 2022, she was fired by Elon Musk, following his acquisition of Twitter.

In 2014, she was described by Fortune as the most powerful woman on Twitter's executive team, though she was later joined by Chief Marketing Officer Leslie Berland.

== Early life and education ==
Gadde was born in India to a Telugu family and moved to the United States at age three. Her father pursued graduate studies in the United States and initially did not have the financial means to send for his wife and daughter until Gadde turned three. Her family moved to Beaumont, Texas.

Gadde received a Bachelor of Science degree in industrial and labor relations from the Cornell University School of Industrial and Labor Relations and a Juris Doctor from the New York University School of Law in 2000.

== Career ==
Before joining Twitter in 2011, Gadde spent nearly a decade working at the Silicon Valley law firm Wilson Sonsini Goodrich & Rosati. She was also senior director in the legal department of Silicon Valley technology firm Juniper Networks. While at WSGR, Gadde worked on the 2006 $4.1 billion McClatchy Co.-Knight Ridder Inc. acquisition and acted as counsel to the New York Stock Exchange’s Proxy Working Group and Committee on Corporate Governance.

In 2018 she announced Twitter's hiring of researchers to study the health of discourse on the platform.

In 2018, Gadde joined Twitter CEO Jack Dorsey for meetings in India where they talked with several Dalit activists about their experiences on Twitter; after the meeting, the activists gave Dorsey a sign reading "Smash Brahminical Patriarchy," which he was later photographed holding. The photograph attracted controversy, with some critics calling the sentiment discriminatory against Brahmins while others deemed it an appropriate response to caste- and gender-based oppression in India. Gadde responded to the social media furor with an apology in a series of tweets, "I'm very sorry for this. It's not reflective of our views. We took a private photo with a gift just given to us - we should have been more thoughtful. Twitter strives to be an impartial platform for all. We failed to do that here & we must do better to serve our customers in India."

In 2019 she convinced then-CEO Jack Dorsey not to sell political advertisements during the 2020 United States presidential election, a high profile move which received both praise and criticism.

She was one of the key officials at Twitter involved in decisions to suspend the account of former American President Donald Trump.

Gadde earned nearly $17 million in 2021 as Twitter's chief legal officer, and earned roughly $7.3 million in 2020.

Following the announcement of the acquisition of Twitter by Elon Musk in 2022, Gadde received renewed attention. Musk contested the existing policies of Twitter, saying the platform should only remove content if required by the law, and criticized Gadde for the decision to block a New York Post story about Hunter Biden. It was reported that Gadde expressed concerns and talked about significant uncertainties about the future of Twitter under the potential leadership of Musk during a virtual meeting with the policy and legal teams. Musk's criticism of Gadde generated some controversy due to online abuse that Gadde subsequently received, including racist slurs, and speculation that Musk's criticism may have violated the terms of the takeover agreement, which prohibited Musk from posting disparaging tweets regarding the company or its representatives.

Musk's comments echoed some other criticism of Gadde, especially from the political right, who have accused her of being Twitter's "top censorship advocate”, for her role in suspending former U.S. President Donald Trump's Twitter account. It also followed criticism of the decision by Twitter, in which Gadde was involved, to prevent users from sharing a New York Post story regarding Hunter Biden's laptop during the 2020 U.S. election where his father Joe Biden was a candidate. Jack Dorsey later characterized the decision as a mistake. Gadde has been defended by others, including by former colleagues and law professor Danielle Citron, who said that Gadde understood the impact of online harassment.

Elon Musk's letter to terminate the purchase of Twitter on July 8, 2022, was addressed to Gadde, as Twitter’s Chief Legal Officer. She was fired for cause after completion of the acquisition of Twitter by Elon Musk on October 27, 2022, alongside at least three other Twitter executives, including the CEO.

In 2023, Gadde received a subpoena to testify alongside James Andrew Baker and Yoel Roth, the former deputy general counsel and former head of safety and integrity, at a session of the House Oversight and Accountability Committee. The hearings are regarding Twitter's suppression of reporting related to the Hunter Biden laptop controversy.
