= Kaplow =

Kaplow is a surname. Notable people with the surname include:

- Herb Kaplow (1927–2013), American television news correspondent
- Lawrence Kaplow, American television writer and producer
- Liz Kaplow, American communications executive and entrepreneur
- Louis Kaplow (* 1956), American legal scholar
- Robert Kaplow (born c.1954), American writer and educator
