= Matrix Awards =

American award for achievements in media

- Awarded for: Excellence in media achievements
- Sponsored by: New York Women in Communications, Inc.
- Country: United States
- Established: 1930s
- Website: nywici.org/matrix

The Matrix Awards is an awards ceremony held annually by the New York Women in Communications, Inc. The award was created in the 1930s by Theta Sigma Phi journalism honor society and professional fraternity, later called Women in Communications, Inc. The Matrix Awards recognize exceptional women in the communications industry.

== History ==
Theta Sigma Phi a national honor society and professional fraternity that was later called Women in Communications, Inc. (WICI) started the Matrix Awards in the 1920s to "emphasize throughout the country the achievements and of possibilities of women in journalism and authorship". Later, it purpose was expanded to recognize exceptional women in the communications industry, including advertising, the arts, books, broadcasting, entertainment, film, magazines, new media, newspapers, public relations, television, and theater. The name of the award comes from a matrix, the mold used to cast type, and represents the beginning of mass communication. The International Matrix Awards were presented by the national organization, The Matrix Awards were originally presented by Theta Sigma Phi chapters to individuals in their communities.

The New York chapter of WICI officially broke away from the national WICI organization in 1998 and became New York Women in Communications, Inc. (NYWICI) to provide its members with more localized benefits. At the time, both the WICI chapters and the NYWICI continued to present the award, with separate ceremonies that were chapter-based. The successor of WICI, the Association for Women in Communications (AWC), started the International Matrix Awards in 1998. After the dissolution of WICI national in 1996 and its successor, Association for Women in Communications, in 2023, NYWICI continues to present the Matrix Awards each year.

The awards are presented at the Matrix Awards luncheon, which also serves as a fundraiser for the New York Women in Communications Foundation to support college scholarships for communication students. In 2005, the Matrix Awards presenters included Tina Brown, Hillary Clinton, Allison Pearson, and Oprah Winfrey.

== Awards ==
Historically, the Matrix Awards were presented in the categories of advertising, arts and entertainment, books, broadcasting, corporate communications, film/photography, magazines, marketing, newspapers, online media, public relations, radio, television, and special awards. In 2010, the categories were eliminated because they often overlapped and had been merged over time. The award now inducts women into the Matrix Awards Hall of Fame.

Some of the recipients of the Matrix Awards include the following, listed alphabetically by last name.

Recipient	Year	Category	Presenting organization	References
Jill Abramson	2006	Newspapers	NYWICI	
Cindy Adams	2007	Newspapers	NYWICI	
Yamiche Alcindor	2021		NYWICI	
Christiane Amanpour	2005	Broadcasting	NYWICI	
Christiane Amanpour	2008	International Matrix Award	AWC	
Madeline Amgott	1975	Broadcasting	WICI New York chapter	
Maya Angelou	1983	Books	WICI New York chapter	
Awkwafina	2021		NYWICI	
Marvella Bayh			WICI Indianapolis chapter	
Leslie Berland	2025		NYWICI	
Halle Berry	2018		NYWICI	
Pete Brewton	1989	Journalism – investigative/interpretive article	WICI Houston chapter	
Mika Brzezinski	2018		NYWICI	
Susan Brownmiller	1984	Books	WICI New York chapter	
Devika Bulchandani	2022		NYWICI	
Candace Bushnell	2006	Books	NYWICI	
Rukmini Callimachi	2017		NYWICI	
Gretchen Carlson	2017		NYWICI	
Nkechi Okloro Carrol	2025		NYWICI	
Kristin Chenoweth	2024		NYWICI	
Joanna Coles	2013		NYWICI	
Beth Comstock	2006	Corporate Communications	NYWICI	
Judy Corman	2001	Public Relations	NYWICI	
Katie Couric	2009	Broadcasting	NYWICI	
Sheryl Crow	2010		NYWICI	
Ann Curry	2009	International Matrix Award	AWC	
Laurel Cutler	1985	Advertising	WICI New York chapter	
Geena Davis	2006	Arts and Entertainment	NYWICI	
Angie Debo	1942	Oklahoma Woman of the Year	Theta Sigma Phi Oklahoma chapter	
Ellen DeGeneres	2006	Special Awards – Humanitarian Award	NYWICI	
Joan Didion	2007	Books	NYWICI	
Maureen Dowd	1994	Newspapers	WICI New York chapter	
Nancy Dubuc	2016		NYWICI	
Lena Dunham	2014		NYWICI	
Eve Ensler	2002	Arts and Entertainment	NYWICI	
Nora Ephron	1997	Film/Photography	WICI New York chapter	
Gail Evans	2001	International Matrix Award	AWC	
Linda Fairstein	2005	Books	NYWICI	
Edie Falco	2005	Arts and Entertainment	NYWICI	
Rita Ferro	2022		NYWICI	
Tina Fey	2010		NYWICI	
Anne Finucane	2013		NYWICI	
Moira Forbes	2023		NYWICI	
Alix M. Freedman	2004	Newspapers	NYWICI	
Nina Garcia	2024		NYWICI	
Nancy Gibbs	2014		NYWICI	
Kirsten Gillibrand	2015		NYWICI	
Ellen Goodman	1999	International Matrix Award	AWC	
Linda Greenhouse	2008	Newspapers	NYWICI	
Mindy Grossman	2013		NYWICI	
Savannah Guthrie	2017		NYWICI	
Maggie Haberman	2021		NYWICI	
Joan Hamburg	2006	Radio	NYWICI	
Bonnie Hammer	2013		NYWICI	
Carla Hassan	2020		NYWICI	
Mellody Hobson	2014		NYWICI	
Karen Elliott House	2006	International Matrix Award	AWC	
Arianna Huffington	2007		NYWICI	
Lucy Jarvis	1978	Broadcasting	WICI New York chapter	
Barbara Jordan	1970		WICI Houston chapter	
Jodi Kantor	2018		NYWICI	
Liz Kaplow	2014		NYWICI	
Gayle King	2010		NYWICI	
Hoda Kotb	2021		NYWICI	
Padma Lakshmi	2019		NYWICI	
Debra L. Lee	2015		NYWICI	
Cynthia Leive	2006	Magazines	NYWICI	
Billie Letts	2011	International Matrix Award	AWC	
Meredith Kopit Levien	2024		NYWICI	
Marlee Matlin	2022		NYWICI	
Kati Marton	2002	Books	NYWICI	
Renetta McCann	2006	Advertising	NYWICI	
Cady McClain	2017	International Matrix Award	AWC	
Audra McDonald	2013		NYWICI	
Cynthia McFadden	2014		NYWICI	
Dyllan McGee	2014		NYWICI	
Mary McGrory	1983	Newspapers	WICI New York chapter	
Idina Menzel	2011		NYWICI	
Stephanie Mehta	2022		NYWICI	
Jane Mayer	2014		NYWICI	
Janice Min	2014		NYWICI	
Andrea Mitchell	2015		NYWICI	
Toni Morrison	1992	Books	WICI New York chapter	
Roberta Myers	2015		NYWICI	
Eileen S. Naughton	2014		NYWICI	
Enid Nemy	1984	Newspapers	WICI New York chapter	
Norah O’Donnell	2019		NYWICI	
Rosie O'Donnell	2011	Broadcasting	NYWICI	
Dawn Ostroff	2021		NYWICI	
Jane Pauley	2008	International Matrix Award	AWC	
Queen Latifah	2014		NYWICI	
Anna Quindlen	1988	Newspapers	WICI New York chapter	
Jane Bryant Quinn	1983	Magazines	WICI New York chapter	
Ruth Reichl	2008	Magazines	NYWICI	
Diane Rehm	2000	International Matrix Award	AWC	
Robin Roberts	2008	Broadcasting	NYWICI	
Bonnie St. John	2013	International Matrix Award	AWC	
Sheryl Sandberg	2019		NYWICI	
Diane Sawyer	2019	Broadcasting	NYWICI	
Dia Simms	2018		NYWICI	
Michelle Singletary	2009		AWC D.C. chapter	
Anna Deavere Smith	2008	Arts and Entertainment	NYWICI	
Judy Smith	2017		NYWICI	
Megan Smith	2015		NYWICI	
Emily Steel	2018		NYWICI	
Gwen Stefani	2022		NYWICI	
Martha Stewart	1996	Magazines	WICI New York chapter	
Meryl Streep	1999	Film/Photography	NYWICI	
Anne Sweeney	2008	Television	NYWICI	
Kara Swisher	2013		NYWICI	
Amy Tan	1996	Books	NYWICI	
Tina Tchen	2020		NYWICI	
Helen Thomas	2002	Newspapers	NYWICI	
Helen Thomas	2007	International Matrix Award	AWC	
Megan Twohey	2018		NYWICI	
Meredith Vieira	2007	Broadcasting	NYWICI	
Diane von Fürstenberg	2008	Special Award – Lifetime Achievement	NYWICI	
Alice Walker	1986	Books	WICI New York chapter	
Barbara Walters	1978	Broadcasting	WICI New York chapter	
Clarissa Ward	2023		NYWICI	
Nancy Weber	2017		NYWICI	
Kristen Welker	2025		NYWICI	
Betty White	2011	Special Award – Lifetime Achievement	NYWICI	
Ruth Reinke Whitney	1983			
Anna Wintour	2002	Magazines	NYWICI	
Judy Woodruff	2003	International Matrix Award	AWC	
Judy Woodruff	2022		NYWICI	
Muriel Hazel Wright	1941	Oklahoma Woman Writer of the Year	Theta Sigma Psi Oklahoma chapter	
Linda Yaccarino	2020		NYWICI	
Bellamy Young	2025		NYWICI	
Shelley Zalis	2018		NYWICI	
Susan Zirinsky	2020		NYWICI	

== Popular culture ==
The fictional television character C. J. Cregg received a Matrix Award on an episode of The West Wing.

== See also ==
- List of media awards honoring women
