= Marie Anderson =

American newspaper editor (1916–1996)

- Born: Marie Willard Anderson; April 19, 1916; Pensacola, Florida
- Died: July 2, 1996 (aged 80); Altamonte Springs, Florida
- Education: Duke University; Katharine Gibbs School
- Occupations: Journalist, editor
- Years active: 1946–1972

Marie Willard Anderson (April 19, 1916 – July 2, 1996) was a Miami, Florida newspaper editor. Under her leadership in the 1960s the Miami Herald Women's Page transformed into a nationally recognized progressive women's section, one of the first in the country to do so, and won the Penney-Missouri Award four times.

== Early life ==
Anderson was born in Pensacola, Florida, as the only child to Robert Hargis Anderson and Marie Willard Anderson, both attorneys. She graduated Phi Beta Kappa from Duke University with a bachelor's degree in English in 1937. She attended the Katharine Gibbs School to learn shorthand and typing, graduating in 1939.

== Career ==
After working as a secretary in a law firm, Anderson took a job as a cub reporter at the Miami News in 1946. There she met and was mentored by Dorothy Misener Jurney. In 1949 Jurney moved to the Miami Herald, and in 1950 was promoted to women's page editor and hired Anderson as assistant Women's Page editor, and together they "transformed the city's women's news" into a nationally prominent section. When she joined the Herald Anderson started a column, Monday Musings, that ran for more than twenty years.

In 1956 Marjorie Paxson joined the department. In 1959 Jurney moved to the Detroit Free Press and Anderson became Women's Page editor at the Herald, making Paxson her assistant. Together they continued work Anderson and Jurney had begun to transform the Women's Pages into reporting on "hard news stories about health, social, employment, and political issues that concerned women" rather than society news and "the four Fs": food, fashion, furnishings, and family, which at the time was the focus of most newspapers' women's page sections. Anderson transformed the section from one containing little information of any importance into one that addressed the emerging women's issues of the day such as reproductive rights.

In the early 1960s, Catherine Shipe East, living in Washington D.C., recognized the unusual nature of Anderson's section and developed an informal news service to make sure the work was seen by important women in the feminist movement. She subscribed to the Herald, clipped and duplicated the best articles, and mailed packets to other feminists around the country. Influential Dallas women's page editor Vivian Castleberry "read Anderson's section religiously."

Anderson ran stories other newspapers wouldn't cover. She ran excerpts of Betty Friedan's controversial book The Feminine Mystique at the same time the New York Times and the Washington Post refused to even publish a review. She also sometimes subverted her own management. During the Richard Nixon presidency, Anderson learned that Nixon had quashed a report from his Task Force on Women because he was unhappy it said that a majority of American women supported abortion rights and believed lesbians could be excellent mothers. Knowing her managers would never allow her to report on this, she wrote a story about it, took it to the printer, had several hundred brochures printed, and sold them herself for twenty-five cents.

Working with the Herald's Clubs editor Roberta Applegate, Anderson also helped transform the paper's reporting about women's clubs, changes which ultimately transformed the clubs themselves and spread throughout the country. With Anderson's instruction, the clubs learned what activities made them newsworthy, learned how to write press releases that would gain them news coverage, and eventually competed to do more good in the community—and gain more coverage—than other clubs. When Anderson won the inaugural Penney-Missouri Award, the citation specifically praised "her success at replacing club notices with news stories." Women's page editors across the nation followed suit in response.

In 1970, Anderson requested a transfer to the city room but instead was moved to the home and design department. She left the paper in 1972 to become dean of University Relations and Development at Florida International University.

In 1973 she was appointed by Florida governor Reubin Askew to the Florida Commission on the Status of Women.

In 1980 she wrote Julia's Daughters: Women in Dade's History for Herstory of Florida.

In 1989 she was selected to participate in the Washington Press Foundation's Women in Journalism Oral History Project, one of four women's page journalists included. The others were Jurney, Paxson, and Vivian Castleberry.

== Awards ==
As Women's Page editor for the Miami Herald Anderson won four Penney-Missouri Awards for General Excellence. The section won the award in 1960, the year of the awards' inauguration. In 1961, it won again, and the program director asked Anderson to sit the 1962 awards out. In 1963 the paper took second place, and in 1964 another first, and the paper was barred from competing for the next five years. In 1969 it won another first. Kimberly Wilmot Voss and Lance Speere, writing in the scholarly journal Florida Historical Quarterly, said Anderson "personified" the Penney-Missouri competition's goals.

== Impact ==
Voss and Speere called her "A Women's Page Pioneer." Writing in the scholarly journal Journalism History, Rodger Streitmatter said that Anderson, along with Jurney and Vivian Castleberry, were the "major forces in helping to change women's pages" and that Anderson "ultimately built one of the most progressive women's sections in the country." Castleberry said, "Back then, there were just a few papers that were on the cutting edge of women's issues, and Marie Anderson's was one of that small number. Papers like The New York Times were light years behind." Herald publisher Lee Hills called her "a leader of the transition from the traditional women's section to the modern living section" and said her leadership had made the Herald "a pioneer in that trend." The Herald called her "a trailblazer who transformed women's page journalism into an arena for politics and social issues."

Anderson's papers are in the National Women and Media Collection, housed at the Western Manuscripts Collection at the University of Missouri.

== Personal life ==
Anderson died July 2, 1996, in Altamonte Springs, Florida. She had no children and was never married.
