= Lee Hills =

Lee Hills may refer to:

- Lee Hills (journalist) (1906–2000), former editor and publisher of the Miami Herald
- Lee Hills (footballer) (born 1990), English player currently a free agent
