= Theta Sigma Phi =

American professional journalism fraternity (1909–1996)

- ΘΣΦ
- Theta Sigma Phi badge
- Founded: April 8, 1909; 117 years ago University of Washington
- Type: Professional
- Former affiliation: PFA; Independent
- Status: Defunct
- Defunct date: 1996
- Successor: Association for Women in Communications
- Emphasis: Journalism
- Scope: National
- Colors: Violet and Green
- Publication: The Matrix; Professional Communicator
- Chapters: 74+
- Alternate name: Women in Communications, Inc.
- Headquarters: United States

Theta Sigma Phi (ΘΣΦ) was an American honor society and professional fraternity for women in journalism. It was established in 1909 at the University of Washington in Seattle, Washington. It was a founding member of the Professional Panhellenic Association in 1926.

In 1972, Theta Sigma Phi was renamed Women in Communications. In 1996, the organization was dissolved. The nonprofit Association for Women in Communications, a professional organization for women in the communications industry, was formed in 1997 to carry forward the mission of Theta Sigma Phi; it went defunct in 2023.

== History ==
=== Theta Sigma Phi ===
Theta Sigma Phi was established on April 8, 1909, at the University of Washington in Seattle, Washington, as an honor society and professional fraternity for female students of journalism. Its founders were seven female students enrolled in the university's new journalism program, the second of its kind in the country. Georgina MacDougall came up with the idea for a women's journalism society Blanche Brace, Helen Graves, Rachel Marshall, Olive Mauermann, Helen Ross, and Irene Somerville.

A second chapter was established at the University of Wisconsin in 1910, followed by the University of Missouri in 1911, and Indiana University, the University of Kansas, and Ohio State University in 1913. Theta Sigma Phi's national officers were the officers from the Washington chapter. In March 1915, the fraternity started publishing The Matrix: For Women in Journalism.

Theta Sigma Phi held its first convention in Lawrence, Kansas in 1918. In 1919, women in Kansas City, Missouri created the society's first alumna chapter, later called professional chapters. Theta Sigma Phi became the de facto professional association for women journalists, who were not accepted into the men's-only Society of Professional Journalists.

More women began working for newspapers when their male colleagues fought in World War I. Several Theta Sigma Phi members were war correspondents, including Alice Rohe who was stationed in Rome, Italy for United Press International and Bessie Beatty of the San Francisco Bulletin and Sigrid Schultz of the Chicago Tribune who were in Germany. However, in the postwar economic slump, men returned to their former jobs, and many editors relegated women to society pages, rather than "hard" news. Women's suffrage passed in 1920, but there was no support for other reforms. Theta Sigma Phi's national president in 1931, Ruby Black, noted that women could not get reporting jobs at the same pay as similarly qualified men.

Theta Sigma Phi held its second national convention in April 1920 in Madison, Wisconsin, followed by its third convention in Norman, Oklahoma in April 1923. Its next convention was held in Seattle, Washington in June 1925. In 1925, Theta Sigma Phi was a founding member of the Professional Panhellenic Association in June 1925. It established an endowment fund in 1927 to fund the fraternity's activities.

Theta Sigma Phi had 34 active chapters in 1930. The fraternity hired a professional director and opened its first national office in 1934. In 1939, it introduced the Headliner Awards to honor members who had made outstanding contributions to journalism. Eleanor Roosevelt received an honorary membership to Theta Sigma Phi for her efforts to aid women journalists, including closing her new conferences to male reporters. Roosevelt wrote several articles for The Matrix.

Theta Sigma Phi had chartered 39 chapters in 1940. World War II expanded employment opportunities for women journalists; however, inequality persisted, and women were regarded as "temporary or less serious workers". At its 1946 convention, the fraternity removed all race restrictions from its membership. In 1950, it had 47 chapters and 29 alumni groups. The fraternity moved its headquarters to Austin, Texas, in 1964, marking the retirement of Jo Caldwell Meyer, who had been Theta Sigma Phi's executive secretary for 24 years.

Marjorie Paxton was the president of Theta Sigma Phi from 1967 to 1969. During her tenure she transformed the organization from a social group into a professional association. Paxson campaigned for a more professional approach, a stance which was not popular with all members, many of whom disagreed with her emphasis on education and training. She led the group to establish a headquarters in Austin, Texas; previously, the organization's files had been stored in the national secretary's garage. She also lobbied to change the name from the Greek letters to Women in Communications, which she considered a more businesslike title; the name change occurred after her time in office ended.

=== Women in Communications ===
In 1972, Theta Sigma Phi was renamed to Women in Communications, Inc. (WICI). That year, the organization also voted to admit men into membership. The organization also decided to focus on women's social issues, such as the passage of the Equal Rights Amendment and the support of affirmative active to create more women journalism professors, and to end the discrimination that blocked women's advancement in academia.

WICI stablished an awards program in 1973 to recognize excellence in communications; this became the Clairon Awards. The national WICI also began publishing the monthly National Newsletter, in addition to Matrix. In 1979, WICI was one of eleven communications organizations that formed the First Amendment Congress, which worked to preserve First Amendment rights.

To monitor national legislation, Women in Communications established a public affairs office in Washington, D.C. in 1980. At this time, its members were using WICI regional meetings to raise thousands of dollars to support the Equal Rights Amendment. WICI created the "Family of Americans for ERA" display featuring a ten-foot-high house made of colorful planks that represented the states that had ratified the amendment. WICI displayed "Family of Americans for ERA" at the 1980 Republican National Convention.

Women in Communications established the Vanguard Award in 1980, recognizing positive portrayal of women. Its first recipient was United Technologies for the "Let's get rid of the girl" advertisement. WICI replaced The Matrix and The National Newsletter with PRO/COM, later called Professional Communicator. Although ERA failed to pass by June 1982, WICI continued its defense of freedom of the press and freedom of speech. It protested the news blackout during the United States invasion of Grenada. More than 100 WICI chapters coordinated letter writing campaigns to Congress to protest the proposed changes to the Freedom of Information Act. WICI also joined the National Committee on Pay Equity and recognized Congresswoman Mary Rose Oakar's leadership on the pay equity issue with an honorary membership to WICI.

WICI's membership peaked in the mid-1980s at around 13,000. To be closer the Washington, D.C., the fraternity moved its national headquarters to Arlington, Virginia in 1988. WICI, Gannett, and the University of Southern California collaborated on the "Women, Men, and Media" conference in the spring of 1989.

Continuing to support social issues, WICI advocated for the Civil Rights Act of 1991, signed into law by President George H. W. Bush. The fraternity also supported the Family and Medical Leave Act of 1993 signed into law by President Bill Clinton. WICI also partnered with Capital Cities/ABC Inc. for its "Stop Sexual Harassment" campaign in 1993.

WICI's headquarters moved to Fairfax, Virginia and its officers began a restructuring process to increase financial stability between 1993 and 1995. In 1995, WICI was in significant debt and its membership had declined to around 800 members. At the fall 1996 annual conference in Portland, Oregon, the delegates voted to dissolve Women in Communication.

=== Association for Women in Communications ===
The organization was reformed in 1997 under a new board and new charter as the Association for Women in Communications (AWC). The AWC national organization closed in 2023.

== Symbols ==
The Theta Sigma Phi badge was a gold linotype matrix, bearing the Greek letters "ΘΣΦ" and a torch. Its colors were violet and green. Its publication was The Matrix (aka Matrix: the Magazine for Women in Journalism and Communications), named for a mold used to cast type, representing the beginning of mass communication. The fraternity replaced The Matrix with PRO/COM, later called Professional Communicator in the 1980s.

== Activities ==
Starting in 1939, the fraternity presented the Headliner Award for members who had made significant national accomplishments. It also presented the Matrix Awards, honoring professional women in the arts, advertising, books, broadcasting, entertainment, film, magazines, newspapers, public relations, new media, television, and theater. The award continues to be presented annually by the New York WICI, a former chapter that now operates as a local organization.

The fraternity introduced its Rising Star Award for outstanding student members in 1990. The first recipient of the Rising Star Award was Laura Glad, a student at California State University at Fullerton.

== Chapters ==
Theta Sigma Phi chartered at least 74 collegiate chapters before going inactive.

== Notable members ==
Theta Sigma Phi became the de facto professional association for women journalists and had many notable members.

== See also ==
- Professional fraternities and sororities
