= Columbia Daily Tribune =

Daily newspaper in Missouri, US

- The March 11, 2007 front page of the Columbia Daily Tribune
- Type: Daily newspaper
- Format: Broadsheet
- Owner: USA Today Co.
- Publisher: Joseph Leong
- Editor: Jim Van Nostrand
- Founded: September 12, 1901
- Headquarters: 313 E. Ash St. Columbia, Missouri 65201; United States
- Circulation: 4,920(Daily); 5,297 (Sunday)
- ISSN: 1543-6535
- Website: columbiatribune.com

The Columbia Daily Tribune, commonly referred to as the Columbia Tribune or the Tribune, is one of two daily newspapers in Columbia, Missouri, the other being the Columbia Missourian. It is the only daily newspaper in Columbia whose circulation is verified by the Alliance for Audited Media (AAM), and it has been a member of that since 1915. The newspaper was owned by the Watson/Waters family from 1905 to 2016.

Although written to serve the Columbia Metropolitan Area, it is the most widely circulated newspaper in the region of central Mid-Missouri. The paper is a broadsheet delivered mornings seven days a week.

In 2025, it was announced that printing and packaging operations would be moving from Columbia to Des Moines, Iowa, to facilities owned by its parent company, Gannett.

== History ==
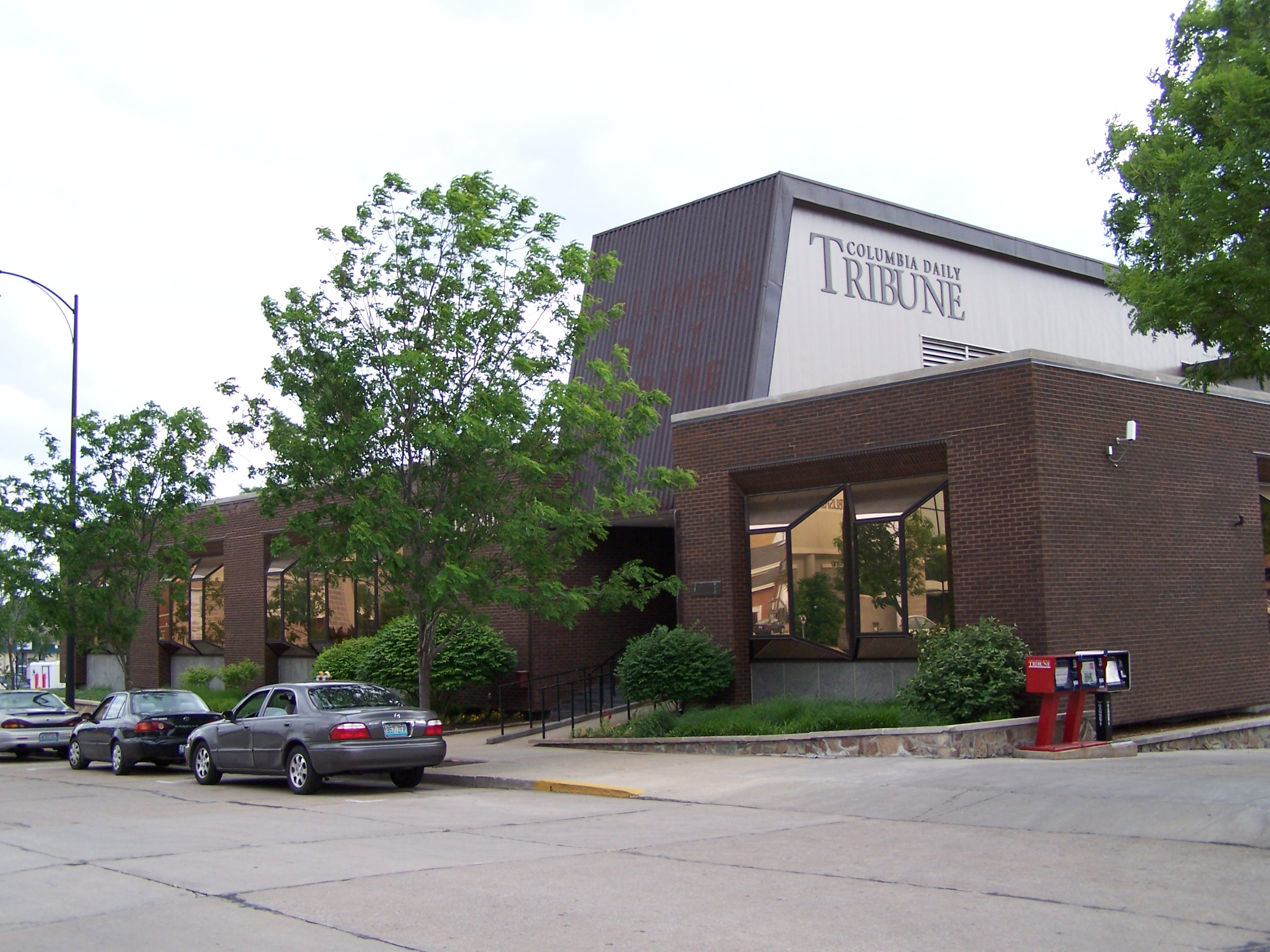
The Columbia Daily Tribune offices

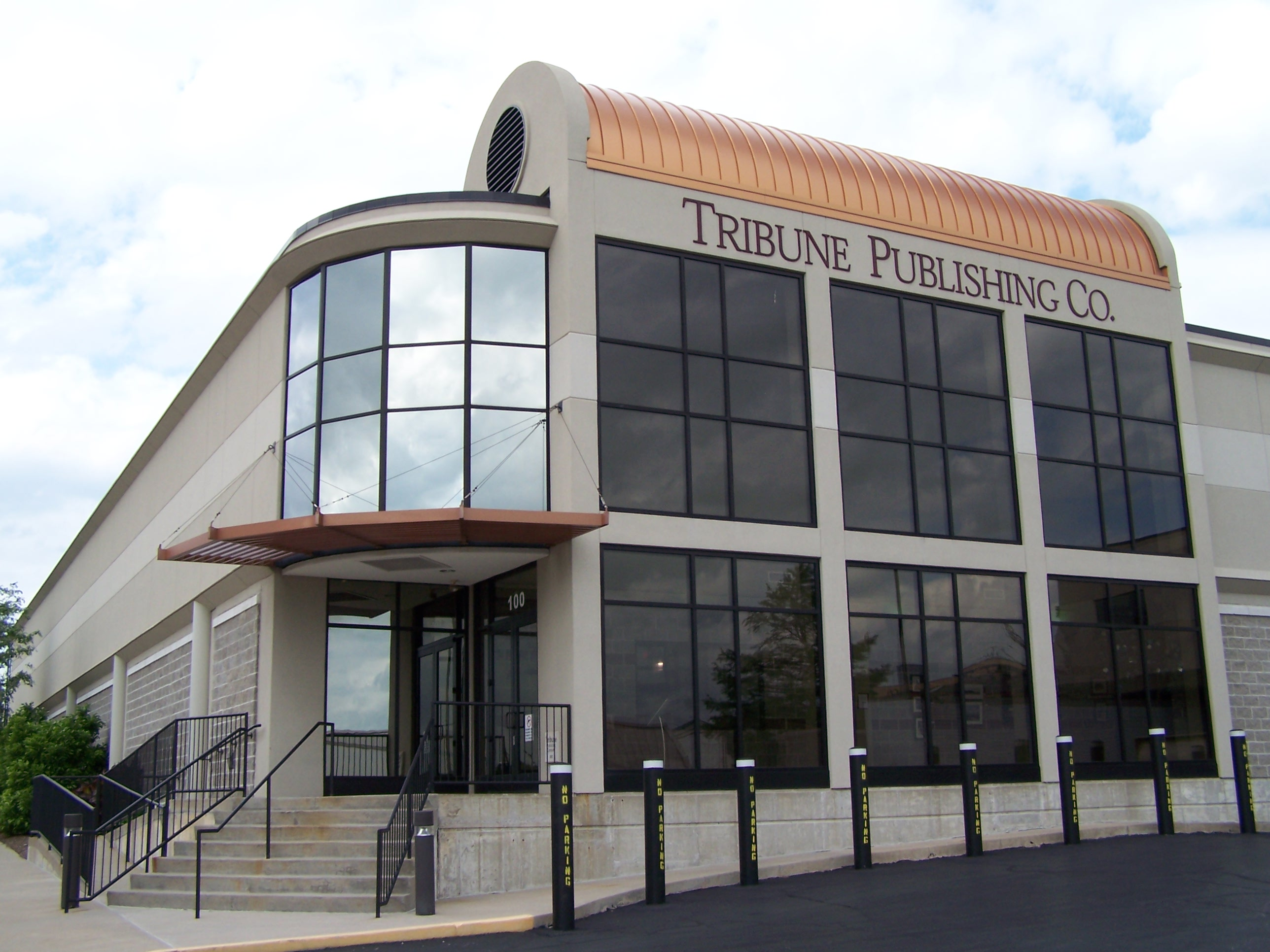
The Tribune Publishing Company Headquarters

The Daily Tribune was founded on September 12, 1901, by former University of Missouri at Columbia student Charles Monro Strong with assistance from Barratt O'Hara as the first daily newspaper in Columbia, Missouri. Its offices were on the third floor of the Stone Building at 15 South Ninth Street.

Before 1901, news was offered by three competing weeklies: the Missouri Intelligencer, The Columbia Patriot and The Columbia Statesman. In 1902, Earnest M. Mitchell joined and they moved its editorial / business offices to the Whittle Building at 911 East Broadway Street, Suite A (now home to KOPN, FM radio station). Mitchell bought Strong out four years after he began the paper in 1905, but unfortunately died shortly thereafter from typhoid fever. Then later that year of 1905, Edwin Moss Watson bought the newspaper. His nephew, Henry "Jack" Waters, Jr., became publisher of the paper upon Watson's death 32 years later in 1937, when Watson's sister, Margaret Watson Waters (Waters, Jr.'s mother), inherited the paper. In 1966, Henry "Hank" Waters, III succeeded his father and continued to operate and publish The Daily Tribune until December 31, 2010.

On January 1, 2011, Hank Waters, III's two youngest children, Andy and Lizabeth, bought out four other family members to take full ownership of the company. Vicki Russell, Waters, III's wife, became the publisher—the first woman to ever hold that position. Andy became president and general manager. Waters, III took the title of publisher emeritus, but will still continue to write editorials.

The Watson-Waters family finally gave up ownership after 111 years and sold the newspaper to GateHouse Media in 2016. GateHouse Media's parent company, New Media Investment Group, subsequently acquired the Gannett Company, Inc. and its chain of media properties in 2019, and the combined company assumed the Gannett name.

In 2017, the Columbia Daily Tribune moved to a morning delivery format for all 7 days of the week. The prices rose to a dollar for weekdays and Saturdays and 2 dollars on Sundays.

In July of 2025, the Tribune's parent company, Gannett, announced its closure of printing and packaging operations in Columbia. These processes were instead moved to Des Moines, Iowa, where other Gannett printing operations take place.

== Environment ==
The Tribune is an environmentally friendly newspaper, using in excess of 90% recycled newsprint. On June 11, 2008, the Columbia Tribune reported that it is the state leader in use of recycled newsprint.

== Game Over ==
Started in 2006, Game Over was a video game themed blog and weekly column in the Columbia Tribune. On December 31, 2006, the Tribune reported that the Game Over article Wii's democracy makes mockery of meritocracy generated 16,766 hits, the ninth most of the year for their site. The column was originally written by Greg Miller, but in 2007, he moved on to work for IGN. Miller was replaced by Paul Dziuba, who was hired specifically for the column.

As of February 4, 2009, Game Over is no longer published.

== See also ==
- Columbia Missourian
- Ryan Ferguson (wrongful conviction)
