= Jeanne Voltz =

American food journalist and cookbook author

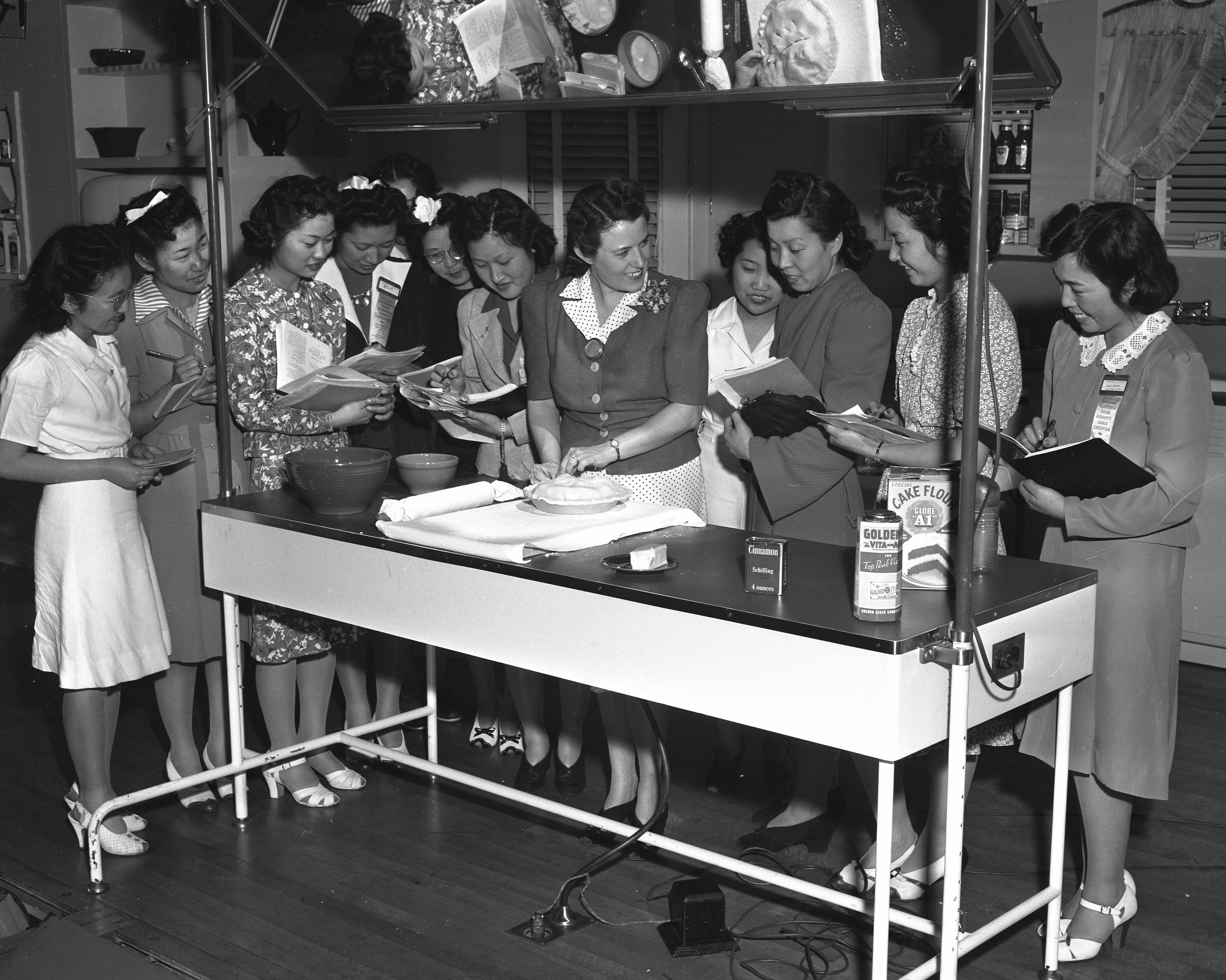
- Jeanne Voltz, billed as Marian Manners, teaching a group of Japanese-American women to make pie
- Born: Jeanne Appleton; November 20, 1920; Collinsville, Alabama
- Died: January 15, 2002 (aged 81); Pittsboro, North Carolina
- Education: Bachelor's degree
- Alma mater: University of Montevallo
- Occupations: Food journalist, cookbook author
- Writing career
- Pen name: Marian Manners
- Period: 1940-1999
- Notable works: Barbecued Ribs and Other Great Feeds; Flavor of the South; California Cookbook
- Notable awards: James Beard Awards; Tastemaker Awards; Vesta Awards

Jeanne Voltz (November 20, 1920 – January 15, 2002) was an American food journalist, editor, and cookbook author. She was food editor for the Miami Herald and the Los Angeles Times, two of the most influential food sections in the country during her tenure in the 1950s and 1960s. She won three James Beard awards for her cookbooks.

== Early life and education ==
Voltz was born Jeanne Appleton on November 20, 1920 (or possibly in 1921), in Collinsville, Alabama. Her parents were James Lamar and Marie (née Sewell) Appleton. She received an AB in political science and history from the University of Montevallo (the Alabama College for Women) in 1942, planning to become a foreign correspondent.

Later, she attended the Academie Cordon Bleu (1960) and studied food, wine, and civilization at University of California, Los Angeles in 1970.

== Career ==
Voltz started working in journalism in 1940 while in college. She started her career as a correspondent at the Birmingham News from 1940 to 1942 and, after graduating from college, moved to the Mobile Press-Register, where from 1942 to 1945 she was a general assignment reporter.

At some point Voltz started using the byline "Marian Manners"; at some point in her career she started using her own name.

She moved to the Miami Herald in 1947, working with Marjorie Paxson under Dorothy Jurney, and was food editor from 1951 to 1960. Like most female journalists of the time, she was limited to working in the women's pages, but was not interested in covering society, fashion or club news. Women's pages at the time focused on "the Four Fs": family, fashion, food, furnishings; Voltz ended up covering food. Voltz, after receiving the assignment, had to teach herself about food and cooking; she concentrated in particular on the food of the South. The Herald was one of the most influential food sections in the country during her tenure.

Voltz created the food section for the Los Angeles Times and was food editor from 1960 to 1973. Her condition for accepting the job was the Times moving the food section out of the advertising department and into the newsroom. Like the Herald, the LA Times food section was one of the country's most influential during her time there. Her stories focused not just on recipes but on news issues such as food safety, consumer issues, studies of the food industry, and food in society.

Voltz became food editor at Women's Day, in an unusual move from newspapers to magazine, from 1973 until 1983; she remained at the magazine until her retirement in 1984. While at Women's Day she promoted the concept of Southern cuisine, which was unfashionable at the time, as a valid cuisine. According to food writer Jean Anderson, she "brought Woman's Day into the modern age" by introducing more sophisticated recipes. While at Women's Day she was a founding member of the local chapter of Les Dames d'Escoffier.

== In retirement ==
Voltz was active in her retirement in the Society for the Preservation of Southern Food.

== Books ==
Voltz wrote multiple cookbooks, three of which won James Beard awards.

=== Bibliography ===
- Famous Florida Recipes (1954)
- The California Cookbook (1970)
- The L.A. Gourmet: Favorite Recipes from Famous Los Angeles Restaurants (1971) with Burks Hamner
- The Los Angeles Times Natural Food Cookbook (1973)
- The Flavor of the South; Delicacies and Staples of Southern Cuisine (1977)
- How to Turn a Passion for Food into Profit (1979)
- Gifts from a Country Kitchen (1984)
- Barbecued Ribs, Smoked Butts and Other Great Feeds (1985)
- Community Suppers and Other Glorious Repasts (1987)
- The Country Ham Book (1999)

== Recognition ==
She won six Vesta Awards, considered the most prestigious recognition for US newspaper food editing and writing. She won two Tastemaker Awards for her regional cookbooks.

== Impact ==
According to the Los Angeles Times, Voltz was "one of the first newspaper food editors of the modern era"; previously, most newspaper food sections were created around advertising needs and some newspaper food writers and editors were part of the advertising department. According to journalism historian Kimberly Wilmot Voss, Voltz was "a groundbreaking food editor" at the Times. Culinarian Terry Ford described her as "the best-known food expert you've probably never heard of".

Voltz's book Barbecued Ribs, Smoked Butts and Other Great Feeds was one of the first to approach barbecue as a valid cuisine style.

== Personal life ==
Voltz married Luther Manship Voltz, a newspaper editor, on July 31, 1943. They had two children. The couple divorced amicably in the 1980s. She married Frank Barnett MacKnight on August 6, 1988. Voltz was living in Pittsboro, North Carolina at the time of her death from pneumonia on January 15, 2002.
