= Renetta McCann =

American advertising executive

Renetta Earldeane McCann
- Born: Renetta Earldeane Walker; December 8, 1956 (age 69); Chicago, Illinois
- Education: Northwestern University (BS, MS)
- Occupations: Advertising executive, CEO
- Awards: American Advertising Federation Hall of Fame

Renetta McCann (born December 8, 1956) is an American advertising and public relations executive who previously was chief executive officer of Starcom Mediavest Group in North America.

== Early life and education ==
McCann was born in Chicago, Illinois on December 8, 1956, and was raised by her mother, a school teacher, and her grandmother. She graduated from Northwestern University with a Bachelor of Science in communications in 1978. Originally interested in political science and a legal career, McCann was inspired by professors such as David Zarefsky to pursue public relations.

In 2009, McCann returned to Northwestern and earned her master's degree in learning and organizational change.

== Career ==
McCann joined Leo Burnett Worldwide, a Chicago-based advertising agency, after graduating from college in 1978. Within a year of starting, McCann became the first African-American media supervisor at the agency. In 1988, she was named vice president, and became a media director in 1989. In 1998, McCann became managing director of Starcom Mediavest Group in North America; after a merger between Leo Burnett and D'Arcy, McCann became CEO in 2000.

During her tenure as CEO, Starcom's client billings exceeded $26 billion and the company grew to over 6,000 employees. McCann was responsible for strategic planning and financial management as well as overseeing clients in the United States, Canada, and Latin America. McCann stepped down as CEO in 2008.

In 2012, McCann returned to Leo Burnett in the role of chief talent officer. She also is a member of Northwestern Alumni Association's Board of Directors as well as an adjunct lecturer.

== Awards and honors ==
- In 2001, named a "Media Maven" by Advertising Age
- In 2002, named "Corporate Executive of the Year" by Black Enterprise
- In 2003, named as one of the "50 Women Who Are Changing The World" by Essence
- In 2006, received a Matrix Award from New York Women in Communications
- In 2007, appeared on Forbes list of the World's 100 Most Powerful Women
- In 2019, received a Silver Medal Award, an award from Chicago Advertising Federation for outstanding career accomplishments
- In 2023, inducted into the American Advertising Federation Hall of Fame
- In 2024, received the Northwestern Alumni Medal for exceptional achievement in her career and service to Northwestern University
- In 2024, received the Missouri Honor Medal for Distinguished Service in Journalism
