= Bea Hines =

American journalist (born 1938)

- Born: February 12, 1938
- Other names: Bea
- Alma mater: Booker T. Washington Senior High School; Miami Dade College
- Occupation: Reporter
- Employer: Miami Herald

External videos
- “History making journalist Bea Hines”, CBS Miami, August 28, 2023.

Beatrice Loretta Hines (née Johnson; born February 12, 1938) is an American former journalist who became the Miami Herald's first African-American female reporter in 1970. Her career at the Herald has lasted over 50 years. Hines has said that she considers it her "responsibility to be a watch-person for people who can't fight for themselves".

In 1981, her front-page columns were nominated for a Pulitzer Prize. Their topics included police brutality and profiling. In 1985, Hines was named one of the top five woman columnists in the United States by Savvy magazine. Hines received the Royal Palm Award from the Public Relations Society of America (PRSA) Miami Chapter in 2023.

Hines appeared in the 2013 documentary, Instruments of Change. Hines' oral history has been recorded by The HistoryMakers. Her papers are located at The Black Archives History & Research Foundation of South Florida, Inc.

== Early life and education ==
Beatrice "Bea" Loretta Johnson was born on February 12, 1938, in Williston, Florida, to Adam Johnson and Ida Lawton Johnson. Bea and her mother moved to Miami, first to the Overtown area and later when Bea was 13 to Miami's Liberty City neighborhood. Bea graduated from Booker T. Washington High School in 1956.

Bea Johnson married James Fredrick Hines in 1957 and had two sons: James (Rick) F. Hines Jr. and Shawn A. Hines. Her husband died when the children were still very young. Bea worked as a maid to support herself and her children while applying for jobs that advertised themselves as being equal opportunity, under the Civil Rights Act of 1964.

== Career ==
Hines was first hired at the Miami Herald in 1966, as a library file clerk for the newsroom. Beginning in 1967, she took classes at Miami-Dade Community College, where she wrote for the college paper. She was encouraged by Fred Shaw and others at the Miami Herald to major in journalism.

On June 16, 1970, Hines became the first African American woman reporter at the Miami Herald. On her first day on the job, she was sent out to report on the Brownsville race rioting in the Liberty City area. She interviewed a self-described "hustler" in the area, named "Iceberg Slim". Her article was chosen to be a front-page story for the Herald because of its lighter touch.

Hines rose from a cub reporter to become a columnist, working at the newspaper for more than 50 years. Her response to racial discrimination at work was to propose that she focus on stories about Miami's black community, which had not been well-covered. During the 1980s, Hines wrote front-page columns about community unrest in Miami, which were nominated for a Pulitzer Prize. Topics she addressed included police brutality and profiling. Hines ceased to work full time as of 2001, but continued to write a weekly column. She was still active as a Miami Herald Neighbors columnist in 2023, at age 85.

Her powerful writing on intense issues has made her one of the most important voices among women and women of color.--Connie Crowther

Hines has taught and led workshops at universities such as Florida Agricultural and Mechanical University, Savannah State University, the University of California-Berkeley and the University of Memphis. She was featured by radio station WHQT on its religious program Sunday Morning Joy. She has also published a children's book, The Ugly Feeling.

== Awards and honors ==
- 1981, nominated for the Pulitzer Prize
- 1984, one of four outstanding women in the country for community work, Spelman Alumni Chapter, Washington, D.C.
- 1985, one of the top five woman columnists in the United States, Savvy magazine
- 1985, Service Among Us Award, Miami Herald
- 2013, appeared in documentary, Instruments of Change
- 2014, interviewed by The HistoryMakers
- 2023, Royal Palm Award, Public Relations Society of America (PRSA) Miami Chapter.
- February 28, 2024, was named "Beatrice 'Bea' L. Hines Day" in Miami-Dade County

== Archival collections ==
- Bea L. Hines Collection, The Black Archives History & Research Foundation of South Florida, Inc.
