= Carla Hassan =

American business executive

Carla Hassan (also known as Carla Zakhem-Hassan) is a Lebanese-born American business executive who serves as chief marketing officer of JPMorgan Chase.

== Biography ==
Carla Zakhem-Hassan is a Lebanese war refugee. She received a bachelor of arts from the University of Colorado Boulder in 1994 and a Master of Business Administration from the Thunderbird School of Global Management in 1998. In 2021, Hassan was named chief marketing officer for JPMorgan Chase & Co. Prior to joining JPMorgan Chase, Hassan was named the chief marketing officer at Citigroup in 2020, having joined the company in 2018. Prior to that, in 2017, Hassan was the executive vice president and global chief marketing officer at Toys "R" Us. In 2016, she was the senior vice president of global brand management of the Global Beverage Group at PepsiCo. During her thirteen years at Pepsi, she also served as chief marketing officer out of the Dubai office.

A champion of equality, on International Day of the Girl Child 2019, Hassan's Citi team launched "It’s About Time,” which was later selected by GWI as campaign of the month. Hassan's Citi team worked in partnership with The Female Quotient to launch the Advancing Equality Calculator, a free tool to help organizations of all sizes calculate their raw wage gap and join the movement for pay parity.

== Awards and honors ==
- 2024, Gold House’s Most Impactful Asians A100 list
- 2023, Forbes World’s Most Influential CMOs
- 2020, The Matrix Awards
- 2019, Brand Innovators 'Top 100' Women in Brand Marketing Award
- 2018, Henry Crown Fellow in the Aspen Institute
- 2016, Advertising Age Women to Watch
