= Vivian Castleberry =

American newspaper editor (1922–2017)

Vivian Anderson Castleberry (April 8, 1922 – October 4, 2017) was an American newspaper editor, journalist, and women's rights activist, who was elected to the Texas Women's Hall of Fame in 1984.

== Early life ==
Born in East Texas, she was raised in Athens, Texas and entered the journalism profession before attending college. Castleberry attended Southern Methodist University in Dallas, Texas, graduating in 1944 with a degree in journalism. In 1999, she received an honorary Doctor of Humane Letters degree from SMU, in recognition for her landmark work in "focusing public attention on the basic issues of equality and justice." She is also an SMU Distinguished Alumnae.

== Professional career ==
During her undergraduate years at SMU, Castleberry worked for the school newspaper, ascending from writer to features editor to assistant editor to, ultimately, editor in her junior year.

Beginning in 1956 and continuing through 1984, Castleberry held the position of women's editor for the Dallas Times Herald's Living section. Her work became known for its objective views of North Texas culture; as she gained notoriety for exposing cultural taboos, she was met with resistance by other editors at the Times Herald:

"She recalled that an editor approached her in a hallway and asked what happened to the 'little girl' they had hired who had 'really believed in God, country, motherhood and apple pie." She responded: "You hired me and you sent me out to see what the real world was like. And I found out that the stories do not happen at the Petroleum Club and the Dallas Country Club."

Castleberry is regarded as pioneer and role model for women's page editors, using her prominent editorial role to provide evidence of the true landscape of women's rights in 1960s Dallas.

"Vivian has truly been a role model and mentor to countless women in this community ... She sought every opportunity to tell the substantive stories of women – not just the fluff and the gloss – and this also meant pushing for coverage of women of color ... Vivian is much loved in this community and has achieved iconic status as a pioneer in journalism who was not content to perpetuate the status quo of 'women's pages.'"

At the Times Herald, Castleberry oversaw the transformation of the women's section from conservative-Dallas-run content to a holistic female lifestyle section. Publishing "serious, timely topics about women," Castleberry wrote about topics oft-excluded from other newspapers, like domestic violence, gender-based work inequities, and child abuse.

During that time, Castleberry was the first woman elected to the newspaper's editorial board. Additionally, she is noted for having been a trailblazer in balancing personal and professional female life, as she continued to work (after initial leaves of absence) after each of her children's births.

Throughout her career, Castleberry won several journalism awards, including two from United Press International and several Penney-Missouri Awards for excellence of women's pages, among others. In 1984, Castleberry entered the Texas Women's Hall of Fame.

Castleberry also founded the Women's Center of Dallas. In 1988, she chaired an international women's conference, Global Peace, an event which drew 2,000 participants from 37 states and 57 countries.

In 1989 she was selected to participate in the Washington Press Foundation's Women in Journalism Oral History Project, one of four women's page journalists included. The others were Marie Anderson, Dorothy Jurney, and Marjorie Paxson.

== Personal life ==
She married Curtis W. Castleberry. The couple are the parents of five daughters.

Vivian Castleberry died on October 4, 2017, from complications of breast cancer.

== Works ==
- Castleberry, Vivian (1994). Daughters of Dallas : a History of Greater Dallas Through the Voices and Deeds of its Women. Dallas, TX: Odenwald Press. ISBN 9780962321689.
- Castleberry, Vivian; Raggio, Louise Ballerstedt (2003). Texas Tornado : the Autobiography of a Crusader for Women's Rights and Family Justice. New York, NY: Citadel Press. ISBN 9780806524481.
- Castleberry, Vivian (2004). Sarah--the Bridge Builder : Dowager of a Dallas Dynasty. Dallas, TX: Odenwald Press. ISBN 9781884363191.
- Castleberry, Vivian; Matamoros, Brenda (2006). Seeds of Success : How a Few Women Changed the Landscape of American Business. Dallas, TX: Women's Enterprise Magazine. ISBN 9780974649412.

== Awards and recognition ==
- 1984 - Texas Women's Hall of Fame inductee
- 2004 - Gertrude Shelburne Humanitarian Award, Planned Parenthood Federation of North Texas
- 2014 - Visionary Woman award
- (3x) "Katie" award from the Press Club of Dallas
- (2x) United Press International award
- State Headliners award
- (2x) National Penney-Missouri Award for overall excellence of women's pages
- Southwestern Journalism Forum award
- Buck Marryat Award for "outstanding contributions and communications"
- Oak Cliff Lions Club Bill Melton Humanitarian Award, April 2017
