= Barbara Sher =

American writer (1935–2020)

Barbara Sher (14 August 1935 – 10 May 2020) was a speaker, career/lifestyle coach, and author. Her books sold millions of copies and were translated into many languages. She appeared on Oprah, The Today Show, 60 Minutes, CNN, and Good Morning America and her public television specials aired regularly in the United States. Sher lectured at universities, Fortune 100 companies and professional conferences all over the world.

In 1976 she launched Success Teams. Trained leaders recruit groups of about 5 or 6 people and lead them through her 8-week workshop for "How to get what you really want, even if you have no goals, no character, and you're often in a lousy mood." Members identify and pursue their wishes in a framework of mutual encouragement, support, ideas for overcoming obstacles, introductions to helpful contacts, and accountability for continued effort.

== Other projects ==
She had a year-long program for writers and speakers called How To Write Your Own Success Story. She also ran websites devoted to her books, programs, and audio materials. During spring and fall of the last years of her life, she lived at her second home in a small village in Central Turkey, where she taught e-commerce to village weavers. In October 2015 she gave a presentation at the TEDx Prague Isolation is the dream-killer, not your attitude.

== Bibliography ==
- Wishcraft: How To Get What You Really Want, 1978 Viking Press, 1984 Ballantine ISBN 978-0-670-77608-5
- Teamworks: Building Support Groups That Guarantee Success!, Warner Books, 1989 ISBN 978-0-446-51461-3
- I Could Do Anything If I Only Knew What It Was, 1994 Dell, Delacorte (over 700,000 books in print, translated into 8 languages)
- Live the Life You Love In 10 Easy Step By Step Lessons, 1996, Dell Delacorte (Winner of Best Motivational Book in first session of Books For A Better Life Commission, 1996)
- It's Only Too Late If You Don't Start Now: How to Create Your Second Life at Any Age, 1999, Dell Delacorte ISBN 978-0-385-31505-0
- Barbara Sher's Idea Book: How to Do What You Love Without Starving to Death, 2004, Genius Press Unlimited ISBN 978-0-9728952-0-0
- Refuse to Choose!: A Revolutionary Program for Doing Everything That You Love, 2006 Rodale ISBN 978-1-59486-303-5
