= Columbia Missourian =

Newspaper in Columbia, Missouri

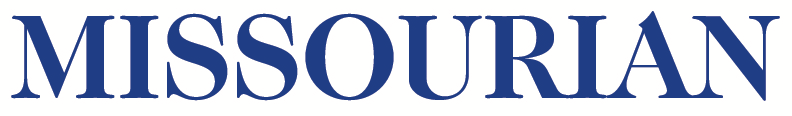

- November 8, 2015 edition
- Type: Daily newspaper
- Format: Print and digital
- Owner: Missourian Publishing Association
- Publisher: Dean David Kurpius
- Editor: Elizabeth Stephens
- Managing editor: Jeanne Abbott
- General manager: Bryan Chester
- News editor: Fred Anklam, Elizabeth Brixey, Gordon Dickson, Mark Horvit, Laura Johnston, Ron Stodghill, Scott Swafford
- Opinion editor: Jeanne Abbott
- Photo editor: Brian Kratzer
- Founded: 1908
- Language: English
- Headquarters: 221 S. Eighth Street; Columbia, Missouri 65201
- Circulation: 4,825
- ISSN: 0747-1874
- OCLC number: 10632065
- Website: columbiamissourian.com

The Columbia Missourian is a digital-first newspaper based in Columbia, Missouri, published online seven days a week and in print five days a week. The newspaper is affiliated with the Missouri School of Journalism, and is owned as a 501c3 non-profit under the Missourian Publishing Association. Students enrolled in staff classes produce the newspaper, which is managed by working professionals who also serve as professors.

== History ==
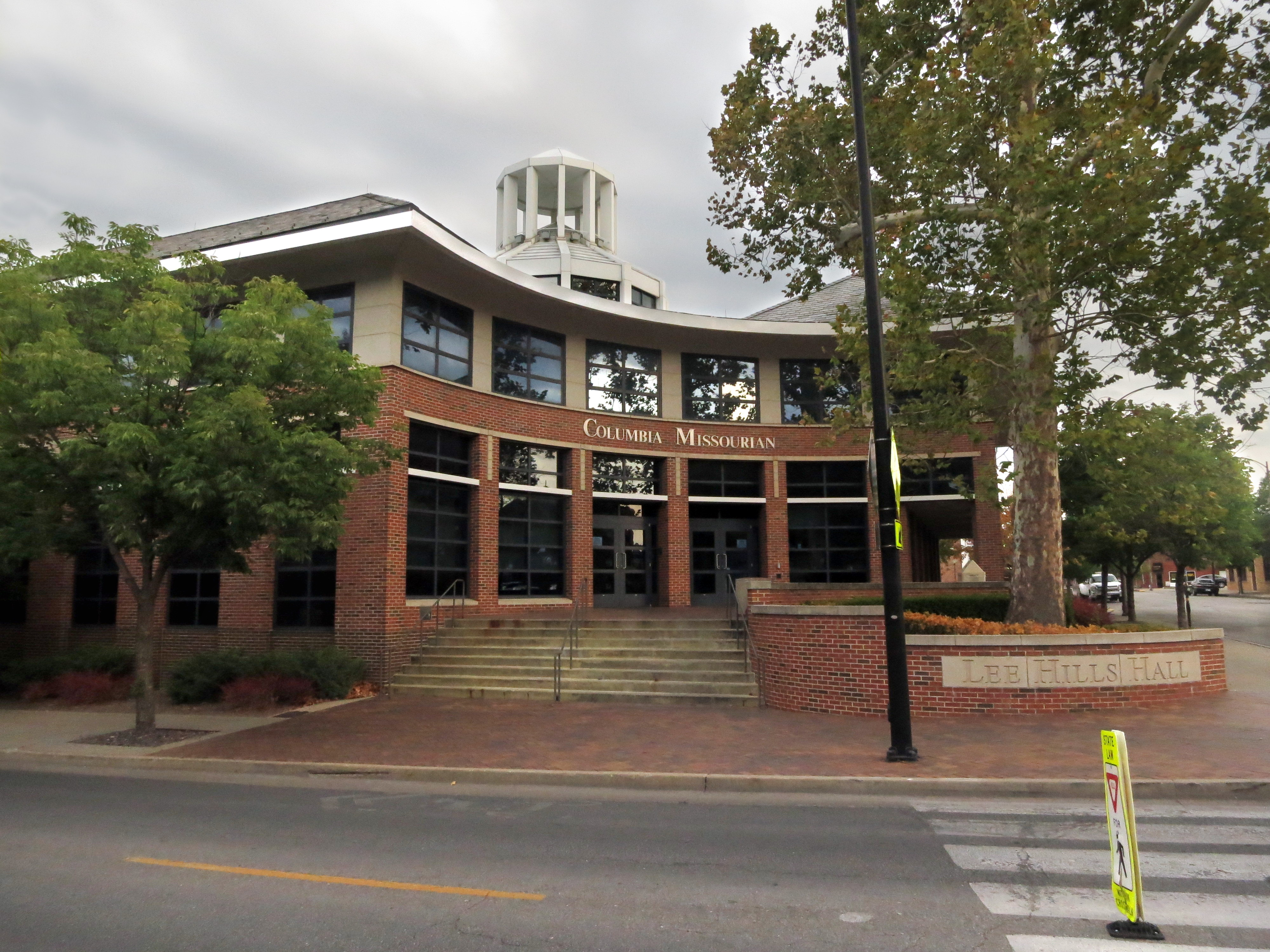
Lee Hills Hall is the headquarters for the Columbia Missourian.

Walter Williams (1864–1935), the Missouri School of Journalism's first dean, helped establish the Missouri School of Journalism in 1908. The first issue of the Columbia Missourian was printed on the day that classes started, September 14, 1908.

Prior to his appointment as dean of the Journalism School, Williams worked at several newspapers in Boonville, served as president of the Missouri Press Association and was eventually offered a position as editor of the Columbia Herald. He faced much resistance of the prospects of a journalism school from editorial boards across the state, but when he was appointed by Governor Lon V. Stephens to the Board of Curators in 1899, a school of journalism became a more likely prospect.

In 1959, construction began on a new headquarters for the Columbia Missourian. The addition to Jay H. Neff Hall included 19,000 square feet (1,800 m^{2}) of floor space with newsroom, composing room, and press room. The new headquarters was dedicated in May 1962.

On September 19, 1968, the Columbia Missourian switched from afternoon to morning delivery. The change was originally opposed by Dean Earl English for fear that students would abandon coursework and spend all night working on the newspaper. Printers also threatened to quit because of the change in printing schedule.

In 1970, the Missourian obtained four federally licensed press-radio units. The radios had a range of 30 miles (48 km) and enabled students to learn of new assignments without returning to the newsroom, and they were used heavily in field reporting.

In 1985, the Missourian became the world's first daily newspaper to use a local-area network for production. A year later, it became Missouri's first newspaper to install a computerized pagination system. The $250,000 system eliminated hands-on page designing.

In 1992, the Missourian became one of the world's first newspapers to offer content in a digital format as well as the traditional print format.

On April 18, 1995, Lee Hills Hall was dedicated as the new home of the Columbia Missourian. The new headquarters was funded by approximately $5 million in gifts from former Missouri journalism student Lee Hills, who served as the first president of the Knight Ridder news service.

On July 1, 2018, Ruby Bailey became the Missourian's first female executive editor.

On December 20, 2021, Elizabeth Stephens became the Missourian's executive editor.

Today, the newspaper is a web-first publication with a print edition published five days a week.

== See also ==
- Columbia Daily Tribune
