= Association for Women in Communications =

American professional organization

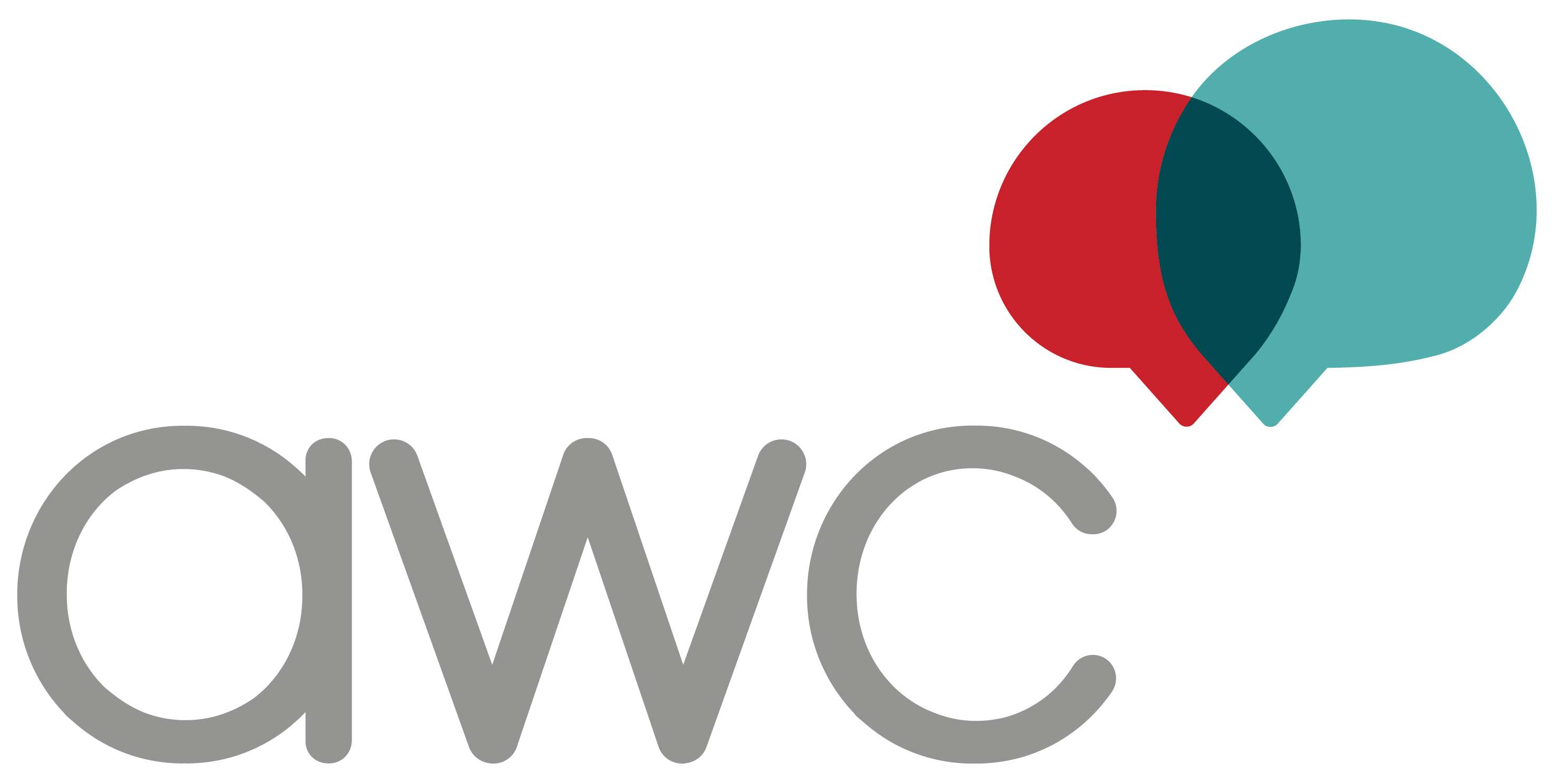
- Logo used since 2018
- Abbreviation: AWC
- Formation: 1997; 29 years ago
- Founded at: University of Washington
- Dissolved: 2023
- Type: Nonprofit
- Headquarters: 4730 S. National Avenue, Suite A1
- Location: Springfield, Missouri, United States
- Members: 3,000 (2022)
- Publication: the Communiqué
- Award: The Matrix Awards
- Website: www.womcom.org
- Formerly called: Theta Sigma Phi (ΘΣΦ); Women in Communications, Inc.

The Association for Women in Communications (AWC) was an American professional organization for women in the communications industry. It was formed in 1996 when Women in Communication (aka Theta Sigma Phi) went defunct. AWC operated until it went defunct in 2023.

== History ==
Theta Sigma Phi, an honorary society for journalism, was established in 1909 at the University of Washington. By 1950, the group had grown to 47 campus chapters and 29 alumnae groups. In 1972, Theta Sigma Phi was renamed to Women in Communications, Inc. (WICI). WICI was dissolved in 1996.

The Association for Women in Communications was formed in 1997 as a new nonprofit organization that would continue the legacy of WICI. The Association for Women in Communication was overseen by a new board and was managed by Club Management Services in Springfield, Missouri. AWC ceased operations at the national level in 2023. Several of its chapters continued to operated as a local organization.

== Activities ==
The society's publication was Communiqué, an electronic newsletter. It presented the Clarion Award, the Headliner Award, and The Matrix Awards. The latter two were originally initiated by Theta Sigma Phi.

== Foundation ==
The nonprofit AWC Matrix Foundation was established in 1998 as an educational affiliate. The AWC Matrix Foundation promoted the advancement of women in the communications profession by providing funds for education, research, and publications. The foundation's three initiatives were:

- Professional Certification Program – recognized excellence in all areas of communications; provided an opportunity to demonstrate communication and management skills and enhance employment/client potential.
- Edith Wortman First Amendment Award – honored professional communicators for their efforts relating to First Amendment issues.
- Barbara Erickson Scholarship Fund – allowed college students to attend the AWC National Professional Conference.

== Chapters ==
Following are the chapters of the Association for Women in Communication, with active chapters indicated in bold and inactive chapters in italics.

Chapter	Charter date and range	Location	Status	Ref.
Bloomington/Normal		Bloomington, Illinois and Normal, Illinois	Inactive	
BGSU	2011	Bowling Green, Kentucky	Inactive	
Detroit		Detroit, Michigan	Inactive ?	
Lubbock		Lubbock, Texas	Inactive	
New York	19xx ?–1998	New York City, New York	Withdrew (local)	(Note: Chapter withdrew and became the New York Women in Communications, Inc., a local organization.)
Pittsburgh	19xx ?	Pittsburgh, Pennsylvania	Inactive	
San Francisco			Inactive	
Santa Barbara	2006–2023	Santa Barbara, California	Withdrew (local)	
Seattle		Seattle, Washington	Inactive	
South Florida		South Florida	Inactive	
Springfield, IL	1985–2023	Springfield, Illinois	Withdrew (local)	
Springfield, MO		Springfield, Missouri	Inactive	
Tulsa	19xx ?–2023	Tulsa, Oklahoma	Withdrew (local)	
UW Madison		Madison, Wisconsin	Inactive ?	
Washington, D.C. Metro Area		Washington, D.C.	Inactive	

== Notable members ==
Name	Chapter	Notability	Awards	Ref.
Rita Cosby		news anchor for Fox News, MSNBC, and Newsmax	Headliner Award 2002	
Margaret Larson		broadcast journalist and television presenter	Headliner Award 2004	
Ann Liguori	South Florida	sports broadcaster	Headliner Award 2001	
Lucile Saunders McDonald	Pacific Northwest	journalist, historian, author	Headliner Award 1959	
Harriet Monroe	Honorary	Poet and founding publisher and editor of Poetry magazine	Lifetime Achievement Award 2001	
Harriet Monroe	Honorary	Poet and founding publisher and editor of Poetry magazine	Hall of Fame 2003	
Gail Sheehy		author, journalist, and lecturer	Headliner Award 2000	
Barbara Sher		author	Headliner Award 1998	
