= Leslie Berland =

American businesswoman

- Occupation: Chief Marketing Officer at Verizon

Leslie Berland is the Executive Vice President and Chief Marketing Officer of Verizon.

== Education ==
Berland earned a Bachelor of Science degree from Boston University College of Communication.

== Career ==
January 2023 to December 2023, she was CMO at Peloton.

2016-2022 she held the role of CMO at Twitter.

2005-2016 she was EVP of global advertising, marketing, and digital partnerships at American Express.

She also had executive PR roles at Ketchum and GCI Health. She is on the advisory board of the Ad Council and for LEAP.

Berland was a Matrix Award honoree in 2025.
