= Miami Herald =

American daily newspaper in Miami, Florida

Coordinates: 25.8070°N 80.3440°W

- The June 13, 2016 front page of the Miami Herald, with the headline story reporting on the nightclub shooting in Orlando, Florida
- Type: Daily newspaper
- Format: Broadsheet
- Owner: McClatchy
- Executive Editor: Alex Mena
- Founded: September 15, 1903; 123 years ago (as The Miami Evening Record)
- Language: English
- Headquarters: PO Box 260518; Miami, FL 33126
- Country: United States
- Circulation: 12,623 average print circulation; 30,840 digital subscribers
- ISSN: 0898-865X (print); 2688-8920 (web)
- OCLC number: 2733685
- Website: miamiherald.com

The Miami Herald is an American daily newspaper owned by The McClatchy Company and headquartered in Miami-Dade County, Florida. Founded in 1903, the Miami Herald serves the Miami-Dade, Broward, and Monroe counties in South Florida.

The newspaper once circulated throughout Florida, Latin America, and the Caribbean, but is primarily focused on South Florida. The Miami Herald has been awarded 24 Pulitzer Prizes. It reaches more than 1.5 million people each week, and millions of readers per month.

== Overview ==
The newspaper has been awarded 24 Pulitzer Prizes since beginning publication in 1903. The paper's well-known columnists include Pulitzer-winning political commentator Leonard Pitts Jr., Pulitzer-winning reporter Mirta Ojito, humorist Dave Barry and novelist Carl Hiaasen. Other columnists have included Fred Grimm, crime reporter Edna Buchanan and sportswriters Michelle Kaufman, Edwin Pope, Dan Le Batard, Bea Hines and Greg Cote.

The Miami Herald participates in "Politifact Florida", a website that focuses on Florida issues, with the Tampa Bay Times. The Herald and the Times share resources on news stories related to Florida.

== History ==
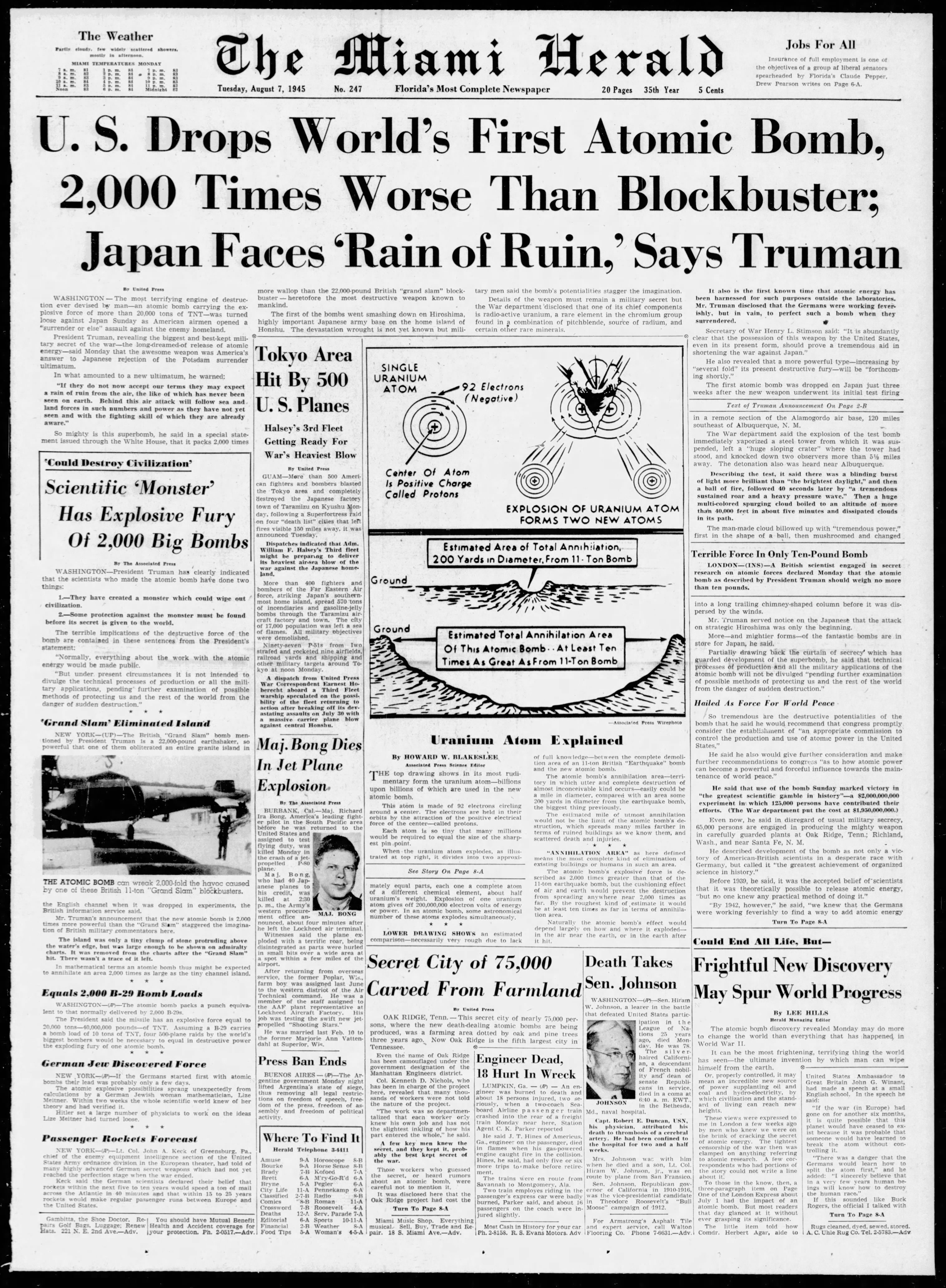
Miami Herald's August 7, 1945 edition covering the atomic bombings of Hiroshima and Nagasaki

=== 20th century ===
In 1903, Frank B. Stoneman, father of Marjory Stoneman Douglas, reorganized and moved the Orlando Record to Miami. The first edition was published September 15, 1903, as the Miami Evening Record. After the recession of 1907, the newspaper had severe financial difficulties. In December 1907 it began to publish as the Miami Morning News-Record. Its largest creditor was Henry Flagler. Through a loan from Henry Flagler, Frank B. Shutts, who was also the founder of the law firm Shutts & Bowen, acquired the paper and renamed it the Miami Herald on December 1, 1910. Shutts, originally from Indiana, had come to Florida to monitor the bankruptcy proceedings of the Fort Dallas Bank. Although it is the longest continuously published newspaper in Miami, the earliest newspaper in the region was The Tropical Sun, established in 1891. The Miami Metropolis, which later became The Miami News, was founded in 1896, and was the Herald's oldest competitor until 1988, when it went out of business.

During the Florida land boom of the 1920s, the Miami Herald was the largest newspaper in the world, as measured by lines of advertising. During the Great Depression in the 1930s, the Herald came close to receivership, but recovered.

On October 25, 1939, John S. Knight, son of a noted Ohio newspaperman, bought the Herald from Frank B. Shutts. Knight became editor and publisher, and made his brother, James L. Knight, the business manager. The Herald had 383 employees. Lee Hills arrived as city editor in September 1942. He later became the Herald's publisher and eventually the chairman of Knight-Ridder Inc., a position he held until 1981.

The Herald was also involved in its first First Amendment Supreme Court case, Pennekamp v. Florida 328 U.S. 331 (1946), in which it and one of its editors, John D. Pennekamp for whom John Pennekamp Coral Reef State Park is named for, were held in contempt of court by the Dade County Circuit Court for two publications it made on November 2 and November 7, 1944, both of which were critical of the court's operations. The Supreme Court sided with Pennekamp and the Herald, and ultimately held that under the facts of that case, "the danger to fair judicial administration has not the clearness and immediacy necessary to close the door of permissible public comment, and the judgment is reversed as violative of petitioners' right of free expression in the press under the First and Fourteenth Amendments."

The Miami Herald International Edition, printed by partner newspapers throughout the Caribbean and Latin America, began in 1946. It is commonly available at resorts in the Caribbean countries such as the Dominican Republic, and, though printed by the largest local newspaper Listín Diario, it is not available outside such tourist areas. It was extended to Mexico in 2002.

The Herald won its first Pulitzer Prize in 1950, for its reporting on Miami's organized crime. Its circulation was 176,000 daily and 204,000 on Sundays.

On August 19, 1960, construction began on the Herald building on Biscayne Bay. Also on that day, Alvah H. Chapman, started work as James Knight's assistant. Chapman was later promoted to Knight-Ridder chairman and chief executive officer. The Herald moved into its new building at One Herald Plaza without missing an edition on March 23–24, 1963.

The paper also won another press freedom case in Miami Herald Publishing Co. v. Tornillo (1974). In the case, Pat Tornillo Jr., president of the United Teachers of Dade, had requested that the Herald print his rebuttal to an editorial criticizing him, citing Florida's "right-to-reply" law, which mandated that newspapers print such responses. Represented by longtime counsel Dan Paul, the Herald challenged the law, and the case was appealed to the Supreme Court. The Court unanimously overturned the Florida statute under the Press Freedom Clause of the First Amendment, ruling that "Governmental compulsion on a newspaper to publish that which 'reason' tells it should not be published is unconstitutional." The decision showed the limitations of a 1969 decision, Red Lion Broadcasting Co. v. Federal Communications Commission, in which a similar "fairness doctrine" had been upheld for radio and television, and establishing that broadcast and print media had different Constitutional protections.

The first African American man to be a reporter at the Herald was Thirlee Smith, Jr. in 1967. The first African American woman to work as a reporter at the Miami Herald was Bea Hines, starting on June 16, 1970. Hines was nominated for a Pulitzer Prize in 1981 for columns which included topics like police brutality and profiling.

Publication of a Spanish-language supplemental insert named El Herald began in 1976. It was renamed El Nuevo Herald in 1987, and in 1998 became an independent publication. The Miami Herald and El Nuevo Herald quickly took diverging editorial directions, sometimes leading to tense relations and conflicting information about the Hispanic community in the USA.

In 1997, the Miami Herald assigned the first national reporter charged with covering LGBT news. Reporter Steve Rothaus, who had been with the paper since 1985, was assigned to this post. After more than 33 years with the paper, Rothaus retired in 2019 as part of a buyout offer made to 450 employees.

=== 21st century ===
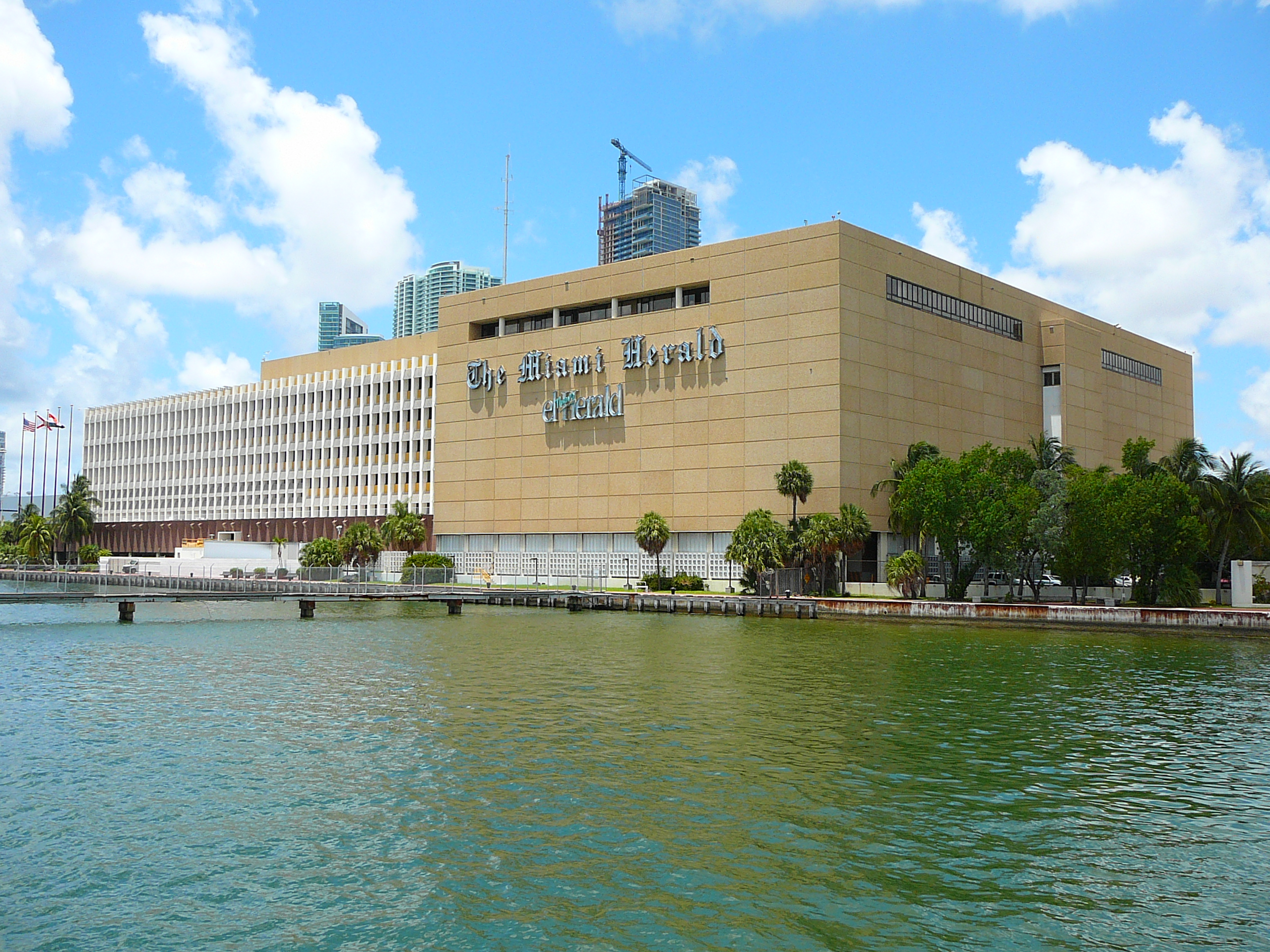
The Miami Herald's former headquarters on Biscayne Bay in the Arts & Entertainment District of Downtown Miami; the paper moved from its waterfront headquarters in 2013 to a location in suburban Doral. The Herald building was demolished in 2014.

The newspaper's logo.

In 2002, the Miami Herald launched its own Home & Design magazine (created by Sarah Harrelson). In 2003, the Miami Herald and El Universal of Mexico City created an international joint venture, and in 2004 they together launched The Herald Mexico, a short-lived English-language newspaper for readers in Mexico. Its final issue was published in May 2007.

On July 27, 2005, former Miami city commissioner Arthur Teele walked into the main lobby of the Herald's headquarters and phoned Herald columnist Jim DeFede, one of several telephone conversations that the two had had during the day, to say that he had a package for DeFede. He then asked a security officer to tell his (Teele's) wife Stephanie that he loved her, before pulling out a gun and committing suicide. This happened the day the Miami New Times, a weekly newspaper, published salacious details of Teele's alleged affairs, including allegations that he had had sex and used cocaine with a transsexual prostitute.

The day before committing suicide, Teele had had another telephone conversation with DeFede, who recorded this call without Teele's knowledge, which was illegal under Florida law. DeFede admitted to the Herald's management that he had taped the call. Although the paper used quotes from the tape in its coverage, DeFede was fired the next day for violating the paper's code of ethics, and he was likely guilty of a felony.

Many journalists and readers of the Herald disagreed with the decision to fire rather than suspend DeFede, arguing that it had been made in haste and that the punishment was disproportionate to the offense. 528 journalists, including about 200 current and former Herald staffers, called on the Herald to reinstate DeFede, but the paper's management refused to back down. The state attorney's office later declined to file charges against the columnist, holding that the potential violation was "without a (living) victim or a complainant."

On September 8, 2006, the Miami Herald's president Jesús Díaz Jr. fired three journalists because they had allegedly been paid by the United States government to work for anti-Cuba propaganda TV and radio channels. The three were Pablo Alfonso, Wilfredo Cancio Isla and Olga Connor. Less than a month later, responding to pressure from the Cuban community in Miami, Díaz resigned after reinstating the fired journalists, saying that "policies prohibiting such behavior were ambiguously communicated, inconsistently applied and widely misunderstood over many years." Nevertheless, he continued to state that such payments, especially if made from organs of the state, violate the principles of journalistic independence. At least seven other journalists who did not work at the Herald, namely Miguel Cossio, Carlos Alberto Montaner, Juan Manuel Cao, Ariel Remos, Omar Claro, Helen Aguirre Ferre, Paul Crespo, and Ninoska Perez-Castellón, were also paid for programs on Radio Martí or TV Martí, both financed by the government of the United States through the Broadcasting Board of Governors, receiving a total of between US$15,000 and US$175,000 since 2001.

In May 2011, the paper announced it had sold 14 acres (5.7 ha) of Biscayne Bayfront land surrounding its headquarters in the Arts & Entertainment District of Downtown Miami for $236 million, to a Malaysian resort developer, Genting Malaysia Berhad. McClatchy announced that the Herald and El Nuevo Herald would be moving to another location by 2013. In May 2013, the paper moved to a new building in suburban Doral. The old building was demolished in 2014.

In November 2018, the Herald broke the story that "in 2007, despite substantial evidence that corroborated [female teenagers'] stories of [sexual] abuse by [Jeffrey] Epstein, the U.S. attorney in Miami, Alexander Acosta, signed off on a secret deal for the multimillionaire, one that ensured he would never spend a day in prison." Thus, the full extent of Epstein's crimes and his collaborators remained hidden and the victims unaware of this arrangement. In July 2019, Epstein was charged with sex trafficking dozens of minors between 2002 and 2005; reporting at the time noted how the Herald brought public attention to accusations against Epstein.

On December 17, 2019, it was announced the Miami Herald would move to a six-days-a-week format.

On January 21, 2020, it was announced that the Miami Herald would close its Doral printing plant and move its printing and packaging operations to the South Florida Sun Sentinel's printing facilities in Deerfield Beach. The Herald stopped printing its own editions as of April 26, 2020.

In 2023, the Miami Herald and El Nuevo Herald laid off six workers, the worst round of job cuts to the newspaper's news staff since 2019. That same year, the Miami Herald named Alex Mena the newspaper's executive director. He began working at the newspaper at the age of 19 and became the Miami Herald's first immigrant executive editor.

The average daily (printed) circulation of the Herald, which was 440,225 as recently as 1998, had fallen to 12,623 by August 2024. Paid digital circulation had reached 44,011, but fell to 30,840 in 2023.

== Spelling Bees ==
The Miami Herald hosts two spelling bees, one for Broward County, and the other for Miami-Dade and Monroe County. The winners of these spelling bees go to the Scripps National Spelling Bee.

== Gallery ==
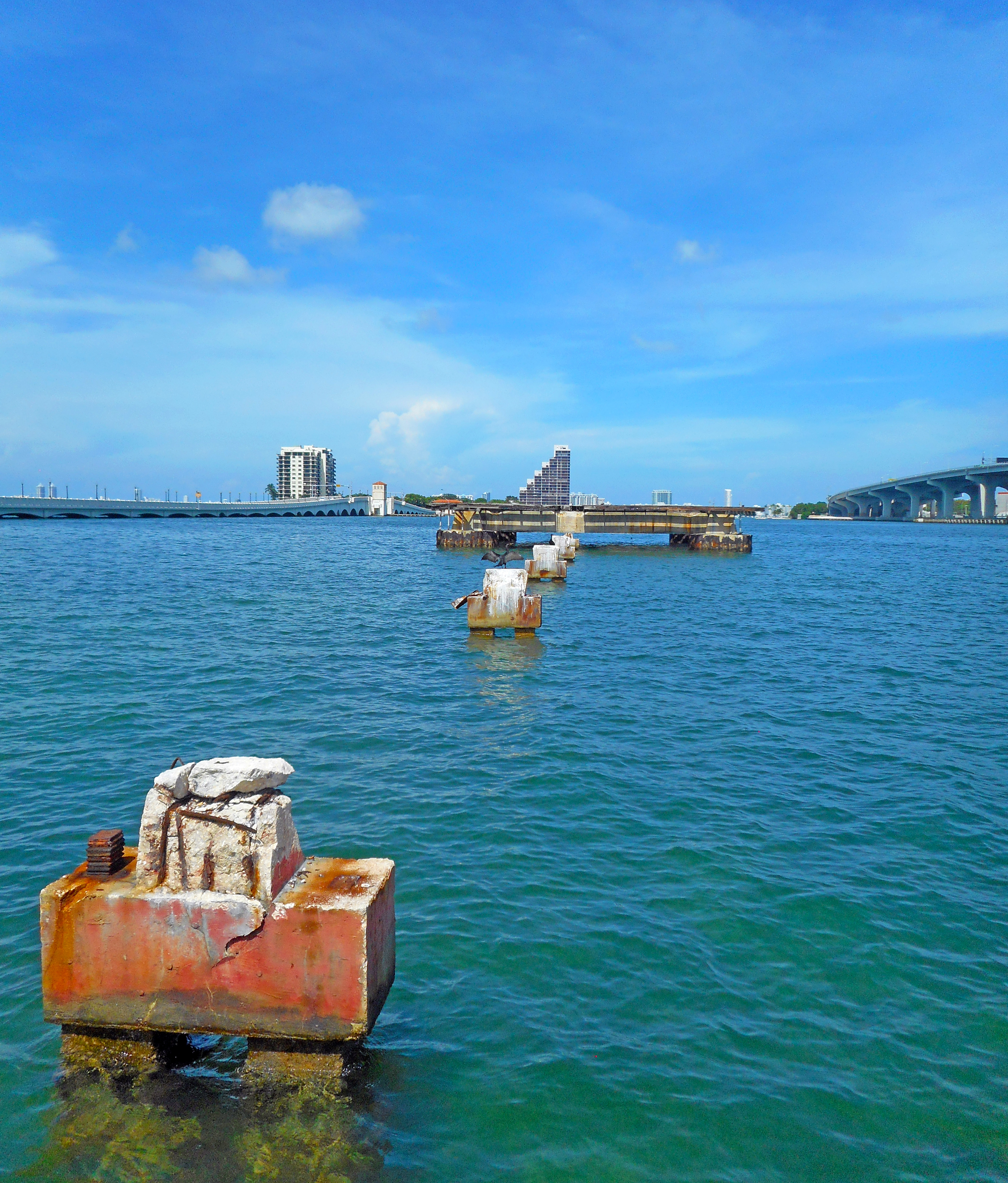
Radio Tower platform and pylons in front of the former building site

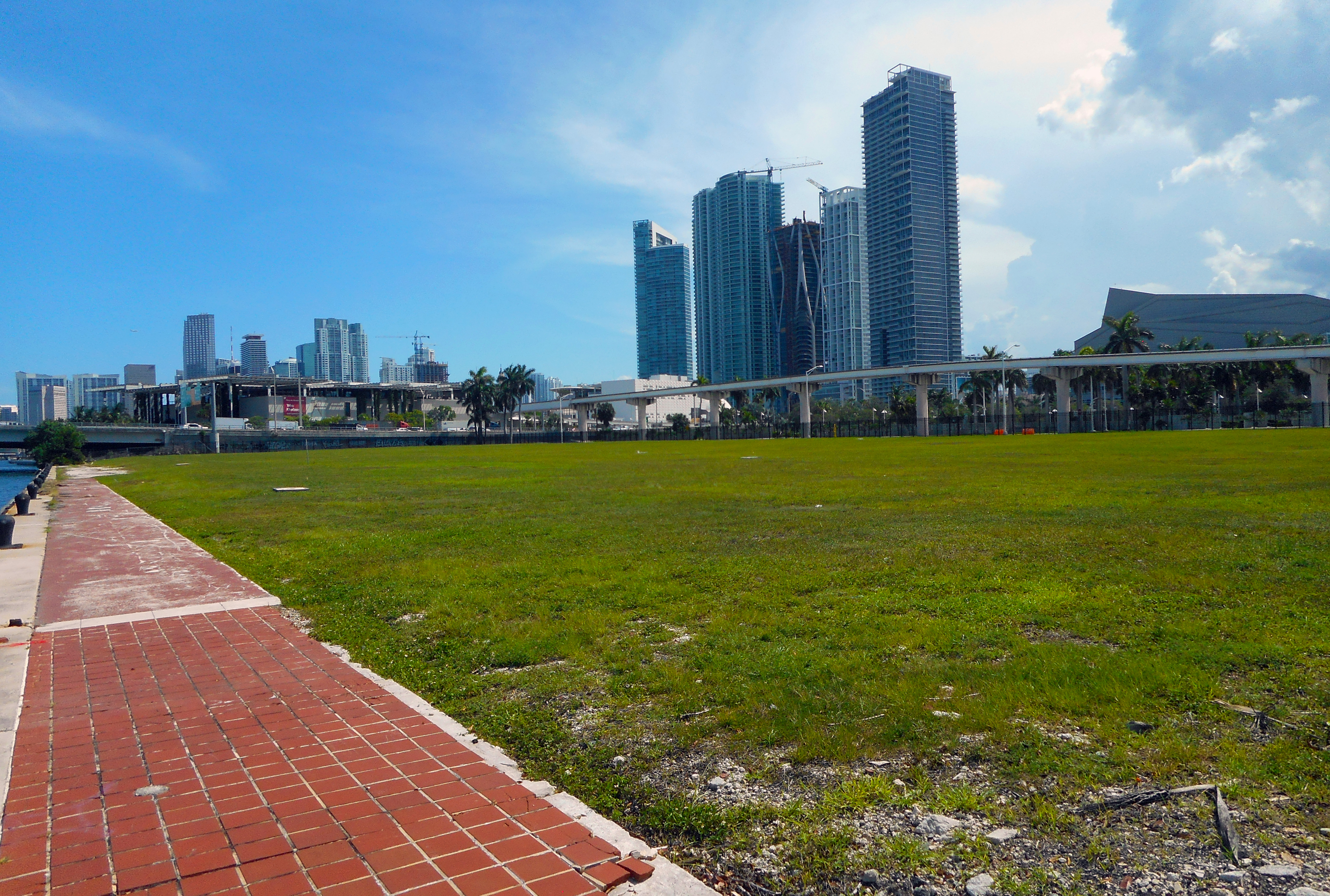
Open field where newspaper building once stood

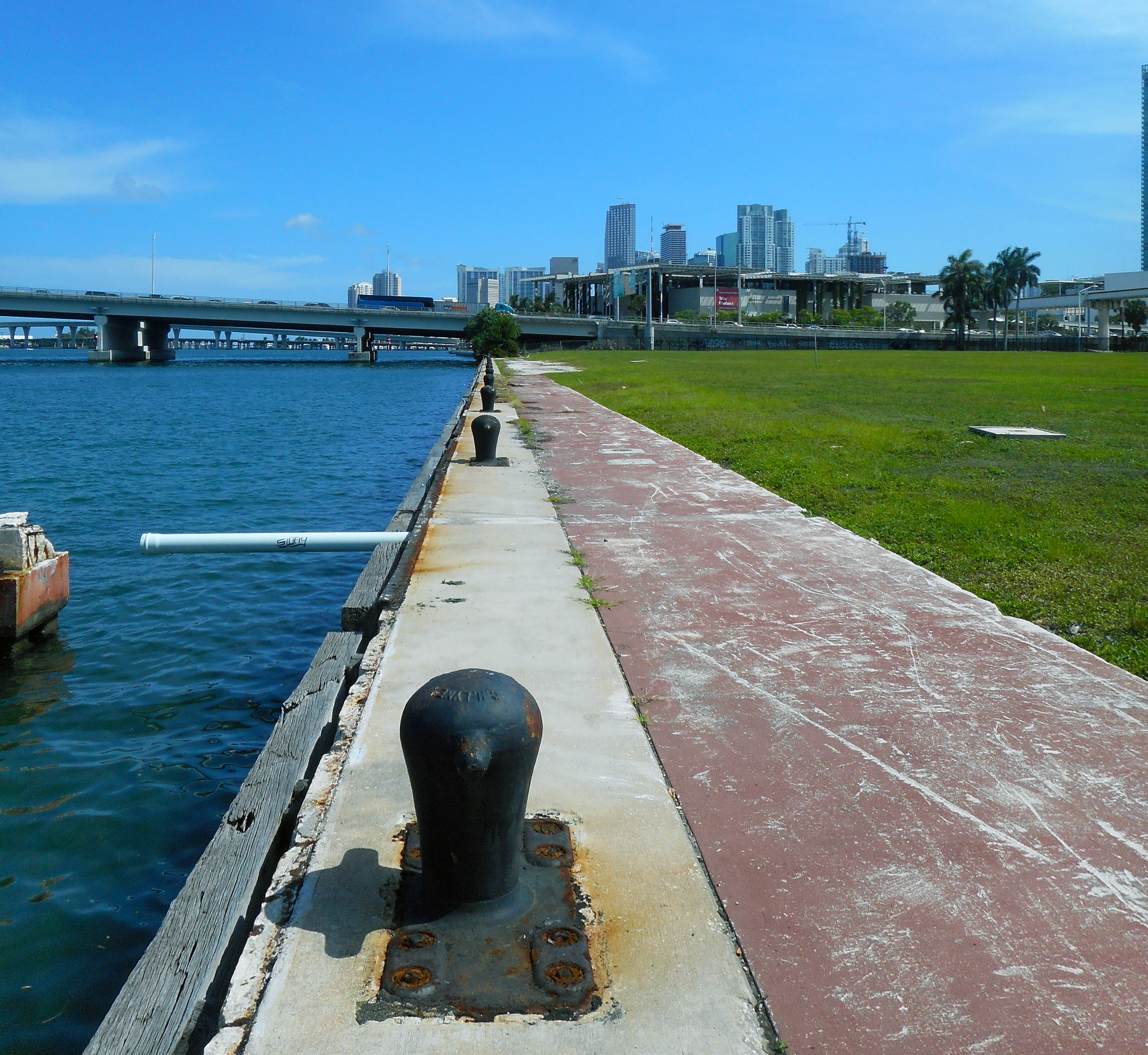
Mooring bollards and remaining walkway

=== Miami Herald Silver Knight Awards ===
The Miami Herald Silver Knight Awards is an awards program that recognizes outstanding individuals and leaders who have maintained good grades and contributed service to their schools and communities. The Silver Knight Awards program was instituted at the Miami Herald in 1959 by John S. Knight, past publisher of The Miami Herald, founder and editor emeritus of Knight-Ridder Newspapers and winner of the 1968 Pulitzer Prize for Editorial Writing.

The program is open to high school seniors with a minimum 3.2 GPA (unweighted) in public, charter, private, and parochial schools in Miami-Dade and Broward counties. Students may be recognized in one of 15 categories: Art, Athletics, Business, Digital and Interactive (previously New Media), Drama, English and Literature, General Scholarship, Journalism, Mathematics, Music and Dance, Science, Social Science, Speech, Vocational-Technical, and World Languages. Each school may only nominate one student per category.

A panel of independent judges appointed by the Miami Herald for each category interviews the nominees in that category. Each panel selects one Silver Knight and three Honorable Mentions in its category for each of the two counties (30 Silver Knights and 90 Honorable Mentions each year). The honorees are revealed during the Silver Knight Awards ceremony, televised locally from Miami's James L. Knight Center. In 2020, Silver Knights received a $2,000 scholarship, a Silver Knight statue, an AAdvantage 25,000-mile travel certificate and a medallion (from sponsor American Airlines). Honorable Mentions each received a $500 scholarship and an engraved plaque.

Because of the COVID-19 pandemic, the 2020 awards ceremony was live-streamed on May 28 from a video studio at the Miami Herald's newsroom; the nominees attended via Zoom video conference.

The Silver Knight Awards have been given in Miami-Dade County since 1959 and in Broward County since 1984. Silver Knight Awards were given to Palm Beach County students from 1985 through 1990. The program is sponsored by organizations with ties to South Florida; the cash awards have been made possible over the years in part by the support of the John S. and James L. Knight Foundation and the Arthur M. Blank Family Foundation.

== Headquarters ==
Miami Herald Media Company, which owns the Miami Herald and El Nuevo Herald, is headquartered in Sweetwater, Miami-Dade County, Florida.

The previous headquarters, One Herald Plaza, were located on a 14-acre (5.7 ha) plot in Biscayne Bay, Miami. This facility opened in March 1963. In 2011 the Genting Group, a Malaysian company, offered to pay the Miami Herald Media Company $236 million for the current headquarters property. The company began scouting for a new headquarters location after finalizing the sale. The then president and publisher of the media company, David Landsberg, stated that it was not necessary at that point to be located in the city center, and remaining there would be too cost-prohibitive. The newspaper moved to its current Doral headquarters in 2013. On April 28, 2014, demolition began on the building on Biscayne Bay between the MacArthur and Venetian causeways.

In a later period it was headquartered in Doral, Florida. It is located in a two‑story, 160,000-square-foot (15,000 m^{2}) building that had been the U.S. Southern Command center. The newspaper used 110,000 square feet (10,000 m^{2}) of space for office purposes. In 2013 there were 650 people working there. The newspaper had purchased land adjacent to the headquarters to build the 119,000-square-foot (11,100 m^{2}) printing plant. The newspaper, working during the COVID-19 pandemic in Florida, was to close its Doral offices in August 2020 and later relocate to a new facility after a period of remote work. The remote work began prior to the closure of the office, which did occur. The publication sold the Doral office in September 2021, getting $27.3 million.

In 2023, the Miami Herald announced its new headquarters would be in the Waterford Business District, relocating from Doral and after being without offices since 2020.

== Awards ==
=== Pulitzer Prizes ===
The Miami Herald has received 24 Pulitzer Prizes:

- 2023: Editorial Writing, the editorial board, for "Editorials on the failure of Florida public officials to deliver on many taxpayer-funded amenities and services promised to residents over decades."
- 2022: Breaking News Reporting, staff, "For its urgent yet sweeping coverage of the collapse of the Champlain Towers South condominium complex."
- 2017: Editorial Cartooning, Jim Morin, "For editorial cartoons that delivered sharp perspectives through flawless artistry, biting prose and crisp wit."
- 2017: Explanatory Reporting, International Consortium of Investigative Journalists, McClatchy and Miami Herald, "For the Panama Papers, a series of stories using a collaboration of more than 300 reporters on six continents to expose the hidden infrastructure and global scale of offshore tax havens. (Moved by the Board from the International Reporting category, where it was entered.)"
- 2009: Breaking News Photography, Patrick Farrell, "for his provocative, impeccably composed images of despair after Hurricane Ike and other lethal storms caused a humanitarian disaster in Haiti."
- 2007: Local Reporting, Debbie Cenziper, "for reports on waste, favoritism and lack of oversight at the Miami housing agency that resulted in dismissals, investigations and prosecutions." In 2007, Cenziper's investigation was featured in the PBS documentary series Exposé: America's Investigative Reports in an episode entitled "Money For Nothing."
- 2004: Commentary, Leonard Pitts Jr., "for his fresh, vibrant columns that spoke, with both passion and compassion, to ordinary people on often divisive issues."
- 2001: Breaking News Reporting, "for its coverage of the seizure of Elián González by federal agents."
- 1999: Investigative Reporting, staff, "for its detailed reporting that revealed pervasive voter fraud in a city mayoral election that was subsequently overturned."
- 1996: Editorial Cartooning, Jim Morin
- 1993: Meritorious Public Service, staff, "for coverage that not only helped readers cope with Hurricane Andrew's devastation but also showed how lax zoning, inspection and building codes had contributed to the destruction.";
- 1993: Commentary, Liz Balmaseda, "for her commentary from Haiti about deteriorating political and social conditions and her columns about Cuban-Americans in Miami."
- 1991: Spot News Reporting, staff, "for stories profiling a local cult leader Yahweh ben Yahweh, his followers, and their links to several area murders."
- 1988: Commentary, Dave Barry, "for his consistently effective use of humor as a device for presenting fresh insights into serious concerns."
- 1988: Feature Photography, Michel du Cille, "for photographs portraying the decay and subsequent rehabilitation of a housing project overrun by the drug crack."
- 1987: National Reporting, staff, "for its exclusive reporting and persistent coverage of the U.S.-Iran-Contra connection."
- 1986: Spot News Photography, Michel du Cille and Carol Guzy, for their photographs of the devastation caused by the eruption of the Nevado del Ruiz volcano in Colombia.
- 1986: General Reporting, Edna Buchanan, for her versatile and consistently excellent police beat reporting.
- 1983: Editorial Writing, the editorial board, "for its campaign against the detention of illegal Haitian immigrants by federal officials."
- 1981: International Reporting, Shirley Christian, "for her dispatches from Central America."
- 1980: Feature Writing, Madeleine Blais, "for 'Zepp's Last Stand.'"
- 1976: General Reporting, Gene Miller, for his persistent and courageous reporting over 8 1/2 years that led to the exoneration and release of two men who had twice been tried for murder and wrongfully convicted and sentenced to death in Florida.
- 1967: Specialized Reporting, Gene Miller, for investigative reporting that helped to free two persons wrongfully convicted of murder.
- 1951: Meritorious Public Service, staff, "for crime reporting during the year."

=== Missouri Lifestyle Journalism Awards ===
In the 1960s under the leadership of Women's Page editor Marie Anderson and assistant women's page editor Marjorie Paxson the Herald won four Missouri Lifestyle Journalism Awards (then called the Penney-Missouri Awards) for General Excellence. The section won the award in 1960, the year of the awards' inauguration. In 1961, it won again, and the program director asked Anderson to sit the 1962 awards out. In 1963 the paper took second place, and in 1964 another first, and the paper was barred from competing for the next five years. In 1969 it won another first. Kimberly Wilmot Voss and Lance Speere, writing in the scholarly journal Florida Historical Quarterly, said Anderson "personified" the Penney-Missouri competition's goals.

=== Other ===
In March 2025, Alex Mena, executive editor of the Miami Herald and El Nuevo Herald (and Florida regional editor for McClatchy), received the 2025 South Florida Hispanic Chamber of Commerce's HLA Communications Award.

== Notable staff ==
- Jeanne Voltz

== See also ==
- List of newspapers in Florida
