= Liz Kaplow =

American businesswoman

- Education: Vassar College
- Occupations: Communications executive, entrepreneur
- Known for: Founder of Kaplow Communications

Liz Kaplow is an American communications executive and businesswoman known for her use of storytelling to connect brands with consumers and influencers and her advocacy for the advancement of women in the field. Kaplow is founder and CEO of Kaplow Communications, a public relations firm based in New York City.

Kaplow was elected president of New York Women in Communications in 2013 and is on the board of governors of Cosmetic Executive Women.

She has been quoted in and written articles offering advice to women on career development and leadership for Ad Age, Mashable, PR Week, NYWICI's Aloud blog, PRNewser and HerCampus.com.

== Career ==
Kaplow studied English at Vassar College and graduated with in 1981. She began her public relations career in the same year, working for the Human Relations Media Company in Pleasantville, New York.

In 1991, she launched her own agency to focus on the idea of storytelling to create an emotional connection between brands and consumers. At the time, she said, storytelling was not a focus for many in the business, but was the reason for her success with her first clients, like Wolford legwear.

In 2002, Kaplow and her team created a holiday "pop-up store" for Target on a boat at New York's Chelsea Piers to engage media and consumers in a city where Target had no stores. In 2008, she conceived the Bullseye Bodega to bring Target to New York for Fashion Week.

In 2008, Kaplow launched the Algonquin 3.0 Roundtable, a 21st-century version of the 1920s literary Algonquin Roundtable, and invited leaders in media, technology and entertainment to discuss the future of media in the modern world.

Kaplow added a digital division to her agency in 2008 and opened a studio content creation, production and distribution in 2010.

In 2012, she launched Knext to help start-up companies and emerging brands with communications strategy development.

== Philanthropic activities ==
Kaplow serves as a consultant to CEW's charitable foundation, Cancer and Careers. She mentors Girl Scouts through her position on the Girl Scouts Honor Roll Committee. She also served as a mentor for BlogHer 2013.

== Personal life ==
Elizabeth Amy Kaplow is the daughter of Irving and Gloria Kaplow. Her father Irving (1916–2005) was president of the Greige goods and commission finishing divisions of Reeves Brothers Inc., a textile and industrial products manufacturer. Her mother, Gloria (born 1927), is an artist and long-time member of The Art Students League of New York.

In November 1981, Kaplow married long-time friend and Vassar alum Evan B. Jacobs, a lawyer, who serves as CFO of Kaplow. They have two daughters, Juliana and Melanie.

== Honors and awards ==
- 2020 PR Week Hall of Femme Honoree
- 2019 Named Honorary Member of Global Women in PR
- 2016 Matrix Award Winner
- 2012 Beyond Beauty Award, James E. Marshall Foundation
- 2009 Woman of Distinction, Girl Scouts of the USA
