= Lee Hills (journalist) =

American journalist and publisher (1906–2000)

Lee Hills (1906–2000) was an American editor and publisher of the Miami Herald and the Detroit Free Press. He was the first chairman and CEO of Knight-Ridder Newspapers and president of the Knight Ridder news service after he helped arrange the merger of Knight Newspapers and Ridder Publications; later in life, he was president of the John S. and James L. Knight Foundation.

Hills attended Brigham Young University and the University of Missouri; Lee Hills Hall, the building housing the Columbia Missourian newspaper, is named after him. While editor of the Free Press, he was the winner of the 1956 Pulitzer Prize for deadline reporting for his coverage of negotiations between the United Auto Workers and Ford and General Motors that resulted in the guaranteed annual wage. He also served on the board of trustees of Science Service, now known as Society for Science & the Public, from 1958 to 1961.
