= Manitoba Grain Growers' Association =

- Successor: United Farmers of Manitoba
- Formation: 1903; 123 years ago
- Founder: James William Scallion
- Dissolved: 1920; 106 years ago
- Type: Trade association
- Legal status: Defunct
- Location: Manitoba
- Region served: Manitoba, Canada
- Products: Grain
- Methods: Grain growers cooperative
- Official language: English

The Manitoba Grain Growers' Association (MGGA) was a farmer's association that was active in Manitoba, Canada, in the first two decades of the 20th century. It provided a voice for farmers in their struggle with grain dealers and the railways, and was influential in obtaining favorable legislation. The MGGA supported the Grain Growers' Grain Company, a cooperative of prairie farmers, and its organ the Grain Growers' Guide. At first it remained neutral politically, but in 1920 it restructured as the United Farmers of Manitoba in preparation for becoming a political party.

== Background ==
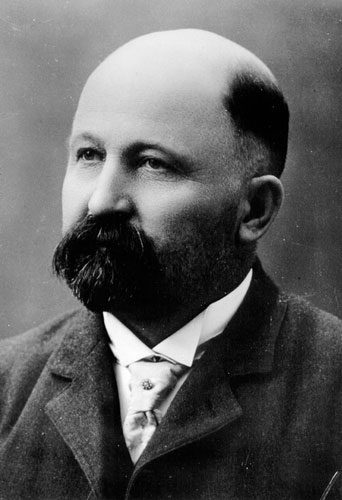
William Richard Motherwell, founder of the TGGA

At the start of the 20th century the North-West Elevator Association, closely associated with the Winnipeg Grain Exchange, controlled over two thirds of the grain elevators on the prairies. The elevator companies, working together, could force the farmers to accept low prices for their grain. When there were shortages of rail cars the railways gave preferential treatment to the companies over the farmers. The 1908 "Partridge Plan" of the Manitoba Grain Growers listed other "ill practices" that included "the taking of heavy dockage, the giving of light weight, misgrading the farmers' grain sold on the street or graded into store, failure to provide cleaning apparatus, changing the identity of the farmers' special binned grain, declining to allot space for special binning and refusing to ship grain to owner's order, even when storage charges are tended.

The Manitoba Grain Act was passed in 1901, designed to prevent these abuses and ensure fair practices and prices in the booming grain trade in the prairie provinces of Canada. There was a bumper crop that year, and farmers found they could not get their produce to market because the Canadian Pacific Railway (CPR) and the grain companies were still failing to conform to the act. In 1901 the Territorial Grain Growers' Association (TGGA) was founded in Indian Head, in what is now Saskatchewan, in a meeting of farmers organized to address the issue. William Richard Motherwell was the driving force behind the TGGA. In 1902 the TGGA won a case against the CPR that forced it to comply with the Manitoba Grain Act. Farmers became increasingly interested in the TGGA, and the Manitoba Grain Growers Association was formed as a TGGA branch.

In 1905 Alberta and Saskatchewan became provinces, and the Alberta Farmers' Association was founded. In 1906 the TGGA renamed itself the Saskatchewan Grain Growers' Association (SGGA). In 1909 the Alberta Farmers' Association combined with the American Society of Equity, another Alberta group, to form the United Farmers of Alberta (UFA).

== History ==
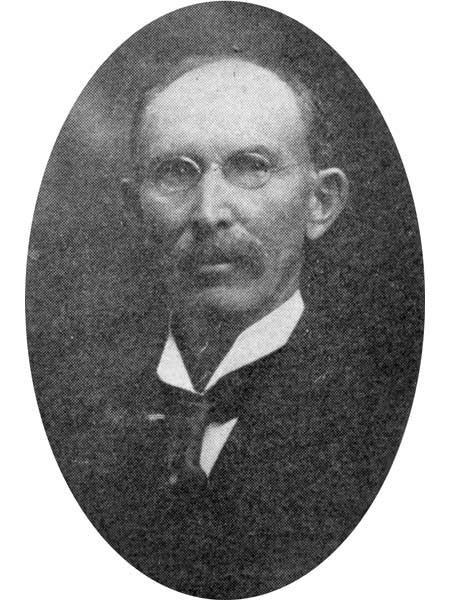
James William Scallion (1847–1926) Founder and first President of the Manitoba Grain Growers’ Association

=== Foundation ===
The first local grain grower association in Manitoba was founded at Virden, Manitoba on 7 January 1903. The Manitoba Grain Growers' Association was formed at a meeting March 3–4 in Brandon, Manitoba. The first president was James William Scallion (1847–1926) from Virden. In 1903 two officers of the MGGA accompanied Motherwell and J.B. Gillespie of the TGGA to Ottawa where they met with representatives of the railways and grain companies to tighten up the wording of the Manitoba Grain Act. The next text was introduced as an amendment to the act which was passed that year. Duncan William McCuaig was president from 1904 to 1910. For many years the former clergyman Richard Coe Henders (1853–1932) was president of the association.

The farmers were mainly Protestant, including Baptists, Lutherans, Methodists, Presbyterians and Anglicans. Church attendance was high, and the churches served as important social institutions. By the start of World War I (1914–18) the Social Gospel movement began to spread among organized farmers, particularly Methodists. The basic concept was that Christianity should be concerned with eradicating injustice and promoting cooperation rather than competition. In 1915 Salem Bland of Wesley College in Winnipeg addressed delegates to the MGGA convention. He supported their decision to demand taxation of unused land, and said that the co-op movement was "part of the divine plan of human brotherhood."

=== Grain Growers' Grain Company ===
The Grain Act did not solve the problems of the grading system and re-inspection machinery. On 27 January 1906 the Grain Growers' Grain Company (GGGC) was founded as a cooperative company to handle marketing of the grain, under the leadership of Edward Alexander Partridge. The GGGC found itself engaged in a lengthy struggle with the existing grain companies over its seats on the Winnipeg Grain Exchange. It was expelled for paying patronage dividends to its member clients, then reinstated when the MGGA exerted pressure on the government of Rodmond Roblin. The president of the MGGA, D. W. McCuaig, sued three of the exchange's members for combining to obstruct trade.

Partridge resigned as president of the GGGC at the 1907 convention, in part because the company's original cooperative structure had been modified to meet the requirements of the Grain Exchange, in part because he was not interested in running the company he had launched. Early in 1908 Partridge convinced the Saskatchewan Grain Growers' Association (SGGA) to endorse the principle that inland grain elevators should be owned by the province and terminal elevators by the Dominion of Canada. The Manitoba association passed a resolution supporting this proposal at their convention. In 1917 the GGGC merged with the Alberta Farmers' Co-operative Elevator Company, founded in 1913, to form the United Grain Growers (UGG), which provided grain marketing, handling and supply until 2001.

=== Grain Growers' Guide ===
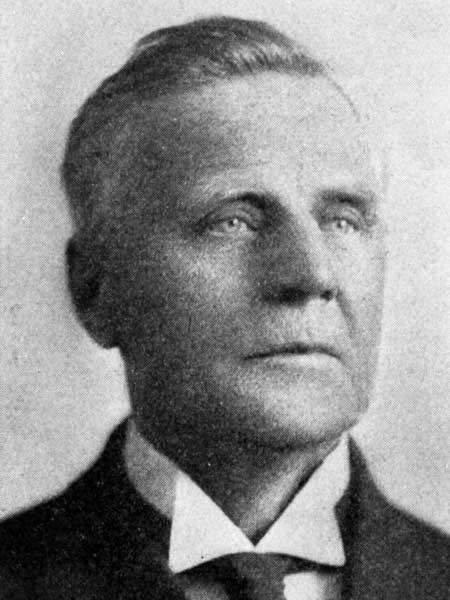
Richard Coe Henders (1853–1932), long-time president

The Grain Growers' Guide first appeared in 1908, edited by Partridge. It was published by the Grain Growers' Grain Company through its subsidiary, Public Press Limited. The Guide represented the interests of the MGGA and its sister organizations the SGGA and the United Farmers of Alberta (UFA). Partridge thought the guide should be a militant paper, but was not supported in this view. He resigned after the first issue, and was temporarily succeeded by Roderick McKenzie, secretary of the MGGA. The next year the guide was made a weekly, and George F. Chipman was appointed associate editor. The Guide was tightly controlled by the parent company and the associations of grain growers, who ensured that it was independent of political parties. From 1911 the editor in chief was George Fisher Chipman. By 1918 it was the largest farm publication on the prairies by circulation.

=== Politics ===
The Manitoba Grain Growers Association took a position in favor of women's suffrage in 1911. In 1912 women were admitted as associate members, and in 1914 the constitution was changed to recognize women as full members. In 1917 a women's section was organized as the United Farm Women of Manitoba.

During the January 1917 annual meeting of the MGGA there was much discussion of the question of conscription. Chipman took the position that if there were to be conscription, wealth should be conscripted first, and this was agreed after some debate. Fred Dixon was known to support the rights on conscientious objectors, which was an unpopular position with most of the delegates, but was allowed to talk on the question of trade. The association was in favor of free trade rather than a protectionist system that would first favor Britain and her allies, next neutral countries and last the enemies of Britain.

In 1920 the Manitoba Grain Growers' Association changed its name to the United Farmers of Manitoba (UFM) in an effort to broaden its base and in preparation for becoming a political party. The UFM began to get involved in local political contests. In 1921 the UFM fielded candidates in the federal election. In the provincial elections the next year the UFM won the majority of seats.

== Sources ==
- Dick, Lyle (2008). Farmers "making Good": The Development of Abernethy District, Saskatchewan, 1880-1920. University of Calgary Press. ISBN 978-1-55238-241-7.
- Fairbairn, Brett (2014). "UNITED GRAIN GROWERS (AGRICORE UNITED)". Encyclopedia of Saskatchewan=. Archived from the original on 2014-08-17.
- Freeman, Barbara M. (2011-12-14). Beyond Bylines: Media Workers and Women's Rights in Canada. Wilfrid Laurier Univ. Press. ISBN 978-1-55458-313-3.
- Goldsborough, Gordon (2013-08-08). "United Farmers of Manitoba [Manitoba Grain Growers Association]". Manitoba Historical Society.
- Goldsborough, Gordon (2013-01-17). "Duncan William McCuaig (1855-1928)". Manitoba Historical Society.
- Gutkin, Harry; Gutkin, Mildred (Autumn 1996). ""Give us our due!" How Manitoba Women Won the Vote". Manitoba History (32).
- Knuttila, Kenneth Murray (1994). That Man Partridge: E.A. Partidge, His Thoughts and Times. University of Regina Press. p. 29. ISBN 978-0-88977-079-9.
- Knuttila, Murray (2011). "Grain Growers Associations". Encyclopedia of the Great Plains. University of Nebraska–Lincoln.
- MacPherson, Ian (2006-02-07). "Grain Growers' Associations". Canadian Encyclopedia.
- Marchildon, Gregory P. (2011-10-01). Business and Industry. University of Regina Press. ISBN 978-0-88977-238-0.
- Sherman, Patricia (2014). "Manitoba Grain Act".
- Sharp, Paul Frederick (1997). The Agrarian Revolt in Western Canada: A Survey Showing American Parallels. University of Regina Press. p. 45. ISBN 978-0-88977-106-2.
- Siamandas, George (2014). "Manitoba Grain Growers Assoc. Fighting for Farmers' Rights". Winnipeg Time Machine.
- Solberg, Carl E. (1985). The Prairies and the Pampas: Agrarian Policy in Canada and Argentina, 1880-1930. Stanford University Press. ISBN 978-0-8047-6565-7.
