= James William Scallion =

Canadian farmer and activist (1842–1926)

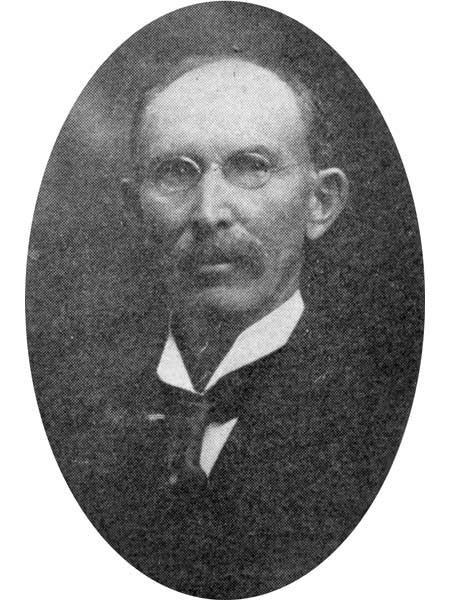
- Born: 14 February 1842; County Wexford, Ireland
- Died: 24 April 1926 (aged 84); Virden, Manitoba, Canada
- Occupation: Farmer
- Known for: Manitoba Grain Growers' Association

James William Scallion (14 February 1842 - 24 April 1926) was an Irish-born Canadian teacher, farmer and agrarian activist. He was the founder of the Manitoba Grain Growers' Association.

== Early years ==
James William Scallion was born on 14 February 1842 in County Wexford, Ireland. He was the first son of William Scallion and Catherine O'Donohue. His family immigrated to Canada West around 1850 and settled near Ancaster in the Hamilton area. He attended the Toronto Normal School in 1867, and then taught school for five years. By 1871 his family had moved to Delaware, Middlesex County. He joined his family in Thorold, Ontario the next year, where he and his brother ran a store.

In 1882 Scallion moved with his siblings to Stonewall, Manitoba. In 1883 they moved to Virden, Manitoba, on the main line of the Canadian Pacific Railway in the southwest of Manitoba. There they bought 960 acres that they called "The Grange", where they successfully farmed grain and cattle. They were the first to buy a farm in the area, as opposed to homesteading. Scallion, his brother and two sisters built substantial stone buildings on the property, which was 2 miles (3.2 km) north of the village. None of them married. Visitors to the district would be taken to visit the Scallions to see an example of what could be done with the land. In 1891 Scallion and other leading men of the district set up the Farmer's Institute in Virden.

== Agrarian activist ==
The Manitoba Grain Act was passed in 1901, designed to ensure fair practices and prices in the booming grain trade in the prairie provinces of Canada. There was a bumper crop that year, and farmers found they could not get their produce to market because the Canadian Pacific Railway (CPR) and the grain companies were failing to conform to the act. In December 1901 William Richard Motherwell (1860–1943) and Peter Dayman arranged a meeting where a group of Saskatchewan farmers agreed to form the Territorial Grain Growers' Association (TGGA) to represent their interests, and nominated Motherwell as provisional president and John Millar as provisional secretary. The first annual convention of the TGGA was held on 1 February 1902, attended by delegates from 38 local groups.

Scallion and other Virden farmers arranged a meeting with Motherwell on 7 January 1903 at which the Virden Grain Growers' Association was found. Scallion was made president. Scallion spent the next two months visiting other farming communities in Manitoba and encouraging the formation of local grain growers' associations. The Manitoba Grain Growers' Association (MGGA) was formed at a meeting March 3–4 in Brandon, Manitoba. Scallion was appointed the first president. At the meeting Scallion said "40,000 farmers had produced 100,000 bushels of wheat and they should all be wealthy but where was the wealth? Certainly not in the farmers' hands but in the homes of the manufacturers, railway promoters, and grain dealers." Scallion suffered from deafness, and in 1904 retired as president. For the rest of his life he held the title of honorary president. He was succeeded as president by Duncan William McCuaig. He continued to speak at meetings throughout Manitoba advocating formation of a cooperative grain company. The Grain Growers' Grain Company was established in 1906.

In December 1910 Scallion and other leaders of the agrarian movement, including Ernest Charles Drury, Robert Sellar and James Speakman, traveled to Ottawa with a delegation of more than 800 farmers to present the farmers' platform of grievances to the government of Canada. Scallion called for the high tariff on farm-related goods from the United States to be removed, since many farmers depended on imports from the US. This became a key issue in the 1911 election, with Conservatives opposed to tariff reduction and some but not all Liberals in favor. Farmers became disillusioned with both parties. Scallion was opposed to the increase in Canadian military spending that preceded World War I (1914–18). In 1913 he asked, "What need is there for a navy now more than there has been for the last fifty or a hundred years? Are the people of Canada going to encourage European militarism and the estrangement of nations by spending millions in the construction of warships?" At the annual MGGA meeting the delegates voted against any naval policy, prompting an observer to remark that "they seem to weigh all public issues on their grain scales."

After the war the MGGA revised the farmers' platform and encouraged farmers to vote for candidates who endorsed it. In 1920 the Manitoba Grain Growers' Association changed its name to the United Farmers of Manitoba (UFM) in an effort to broaden its base and in preparation for becoming a political party. Scallion was nominated as a candidate for UFM president, but his name was withdrawn due to his poor health. The UFM began to get involved in local political contests. In 1921 the UFM fielded candidates in the federal election. In the provincial elections the next year the UFM won the majority of seats.

Scallion and his sister gave a CAN$10,000 endowment fund for the Virden Hospital, and shortly after gave a CAN$5,000 endowment to the Virden Cemetery. James William Scallion died on 24 April 1926 at his home in Virden. He was aged 84. Scallion Creek in Virden bears his name. In December 1957 it was announced that the North Virden oil fields were to be slightly enlarged and called the North Virden Scallion oilfields. The old Scallion farm with its huge stone farm buildings was located in the oil field.

== Sources ==
- Clingan, Ida (1957). The Virden Story (PDF). The Empire Publishing Co. Archived from the original on August 19, 2013.
- Dick, Lyle (2008). Farmers "making Good": The Development of Abernethy District, Saskatchewan, 1880-1920. University of Calgary Press. ISBN 978-1-55238-241-7.
- Emmerson, Charles (2013-05-07). 1913: In Search of the World Before the Great War. PublicAffairs. ISBN 978-1-61039-257-0.
- "James William Scallion (1847-1926)". Memorable Manitobans. Manitoba Historical Society.
- Goldsborough, Gordon (2013-08-08). "United Farmers of Manitoba [Manitoba Grain Growers Association]". Manitoba Historical Society.
- Goldsborough, Gordon (2013-01-17). "Duncan William McCuaig (1855-1928)". Manitoba Historical Society.
- Knuttila, Murray (2011). "Grain Growers Associations". Encyclopedia of the Great Plains. University of Nebraska–Lincoln.
- MacPherson, Ian (2006-02-07). "Grain Growers' Associations". Canadian Encyclopedia.
- Nicholson, Karen (2005). "SCALLION, JAMES WILLIAM". Dictionary of Canadian Biography. Vol. XV (1921-1930). University of Toronto/Université Laval.
- "Oil Field Honors Old Virden Name". Winnipeg Free Press. Location: Winnipeg, Manitoba. 1957-12-19.
- Solberg, Carl E. (1985). The Prairies and the Pampas: Agrarian Policy in Canada and Argentina, 1880-1930. Stanford University Press. ISBN 978-0-8047-6565-7.
- "Virden Downtown Heritage District: People". Virtual Manitoba.
