= George Fisher Chipman =

Canadian journalist (1882–1935)

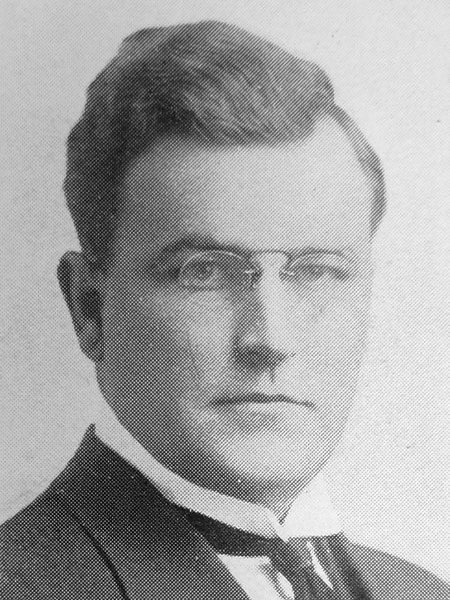
- Born: 18 January 1882; Nictaux West, Annapolis County, Nova Scotia, Canada
- Died: 26 December 1935 (aged 53); Charleswood, Winnipeg, Canada
- Occupation: Journalist
- Known for: Grain Growers' Guide

George Fisher Chipman (18 January 1882 – 26 December 1935) was a Canadian journalist who edited the Grain Growers' Guide for many years. The paper was the official organ of the provincial grain growers' associations in the Canadian prairies, and became the mostly widely circulated farmers' paper in the region.

== Early years ==
George Fisher Chipman was born on 18 January 1882 in Nictaux West, Annapolis County, Nova Scotia. His parents were F. Miles Chipman and Annie S. Fisher. He attended the Middleton High School and the Nova Scotia Normal School, and in 1900 became a school teacher. In 1905, Chipman moved to Winnipeg, Manitoba, and obtained a job as a reporter for the Manitoba Free Press.

In 1909, an article by Chipman appeared in Canadian Magazine called "Winnipeg: The Melting Pot." Based on his experience teaching immigrant children in rural Alberta he expressed concern about immigration from Ukraine, particularly when the newcomers were forced into ethnic enclaves in the city where they were out of touch with Canadian values and culture. While sympathetic to the immigrant's struggle, he saw the situation as one that would lead to crime, delinquency and corruption by both the immigrants and Canadians who exploited them. He thought that little could be done with the older immigrants, but it was essential to make efforts to assimilate their children as Canadians.

== Grain Growers' Guide ==
The agrarian activist Edward Alexander Partridge helped organize the Grain Growers' Guide. The first issue appeared in June 1908 as the official organ of the Manitoba Grain Growers' Association (MGGA). It was published by the Grain Growers' Grain Company through its subsidiary, Public Press Limited. Partridge was the editor. Partridge thought the guide should be a militant paper, but the co-founders did not agree. He resigned after the first issue. Roderick McKenzie succeeded him as editor until 1911.

In 1909, the Guide was made a weekly, and Chipman was appointed associate editor. By the end of that year the Guide was the official organ of the (MGGA) and its sister associations, the Saskatchewan Grain Growers' Association (SGGA) and the United Farmers of Alberta (UFA). Chipman edited the Guide from 1911 until 1928, and edited its successor The Country Guide until his death in 1935. Although editor-in-chief, he continued to discuss management issues and controversial editorials with other executives such as Thomas Crerar. The Guide covered topics of interest to western Canada prairie farmers including politics, cooperative associations, animal husbandry and new agricultural techniques. The paper became an essential source of information about the outside world to prairie farmers. By 1918, the Guide was the largest farm publication on the prairies by circulation.

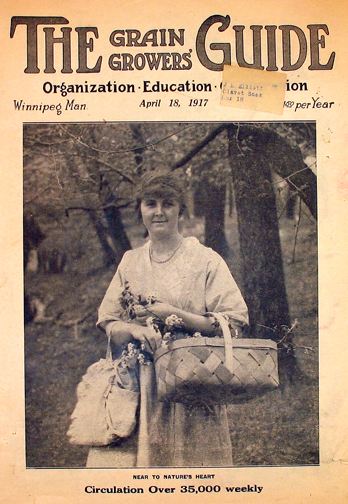
Guide cover from 18 April 1917

Before World War I (1914–1918) western Canada had experienced a flood of immigrants from eastern European countries, some of which were now at war with the British Empire. The government planned to exclude these "enemy aliens" from the vote, and to give the vote only to women of British origin who had male relatives serving overseas. The government also planned to introduce conscription into the army. At the annual meeting of the MGGA in January 1917 Chipman argued that if conscription were enacted, wealth should be enlisted first. At that convention he supported Fred Dixon's right to speak, despite objections from some members on the grounds that Dixon supported conscientious objectors.

Francis Marion Beynon, a leading feminist, was editor of the women's page of the Guide. She supported giving all immigrants the right to vote, opposed conscription without a plebiscite, and believed the issues should be freely discussed in public. In late June 1917, Beynon left Winnipeg and moved to New York City. Some sources say her opinions caused conflicts with Chipman, leading to Beynon's resignation. However, Chipman gave Beynon considerable freedom in publishing her comments, and continued to publish her views for several weeks after she left.

Later the Guide changed its position to support conscription and limits to women's suffrage. Chipman became convinced that it would be in the interest of the grain growers to support the government on the conscription question, and that this would help advance the Farmer's Platform of full women's suffrage and re-distributive personal and corporate income taxes. A Guide editorial said, "The union government is framed on the basis of a political truce and the organized farmers, we believe, are willing to hold firmly for that truce until the end of the war."

Under Chipman the paper's editorials reflected lack of faith in the traditional political parties. It supported a more organized system of grain marketing to shield farmers from price fluctuations and ensure reliable railway transport for their crops. In 1920, he wrote an editorial in which he attacked the special interests who he said were trying to use the threat of withdrawal of advertising to muzzle the paper. He wrote, "For many years past, the protected interests have been accustomed to having the tariff made to suit themselves. They have had secret dealings with governments, both Liberal and Conservative and the tariff has been arranged quite satisfactorily ... it is the farmers who pay the big bulk of the enhanced prices due to tariff protection."

== Other activities ==
Chipman married Emily Raymond Christie of River Hebert, Nova Scotia, in 1907. They had two children, a boy and a girl. Chipman competed for election to the provincial parliament in 1922, but lost by a small margin. In 1923, he started a major program to breed fruit and vegetables at his 4 acres (1.6 ha) property in Charleswood. He belonged to the First Baptist Church and was a member of the Manitoba Club. George Fisher Chipman died on 26 December 1935 on his farm. His gun discharged by accident while he was out shooting rabbits with his hired hand.

== Publications ==
Chipman wrote various articles on horticulture in the Guide, and published a number of pamphlets on the subject. Other publications included:

- Chipman, George Fisher (1910). The Siege of Ottawa: Being the Story of 800 Farmers from Ontario, Quebec, New Brunswick, Nova Scotia, Manitoba, Saskatchewan, and Alberta : who Met the Government and Members of Parliament in the House of Commons Chamber on December 16, 1910, and Demanded More Equitable Legislation. Grain Growers Guide.
- Chipman, George Fisher (1933). Fruit Growing in Manitoba, Saskatchewan, Alberta ... Country Guide Limited.

== Sources ==
- Dale-Burnett, Lisa Lynne (2006). Saskatchewan Agriculture: Lives Past and Present. University of Regina Press. ISBN 978-0-88977-169-7.
- Freeman, Barbara M. (2011-12-14). Beyond Bylines: Media Workers and Women's Rights in Canada. Wilfrid Laurier Univ. Press. ISBN 978-1-55458-313-3.
- Goldsborough, Gordon (2013-09-13). "George Fisher Chipman (1882-1935)". Manitoba Historical Society.
- Goldsborough, Gordon (2013-08-08). "United Farmers of Manitoba [Manitoba Grain Growers Association]". Manitoba Historical Society.
- Kelcey, Barabara E.; Davis, Angela E. (1997). A Great Movement Underway: Women and The Grain Growers' Guide (1908-1928) (PDF). Winnipeg: Manitoba Record Society. ISBN 9780969210153.
- Knuttila, Kenneth Murray (1994). That Man Partridge: E.A. Partidge, His Thoughts and Times. University of Regina Press. p. 29. ISBN 978-0-88977-079-9.
- Shilliday, Jim (2007). Canada's Wheat King: The Life and Times of Seager Wheeler. University of Regina Press. ISBN 978-0-88977-187-1.
- Swyripa, Frances (1978). Ukrainian Canadians: A Survey of Their Portrayal in English-language Works. Canadian Institute of Ukrainian Studies. ISBN 978-0-88864-022-2.
