= Saskatchewan Grain Growers' Association =

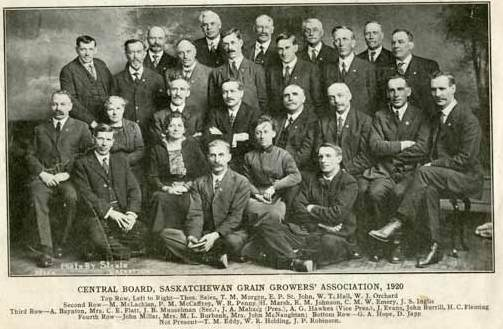
- Central Board, Saskatchewan Grain Growers Association, 1920
- Predecessor: Territorial Grain Growers' Association
- Successor: United Farmers of Canada
- Formation: 1906
- Dissolved: 1926
- Type: Trade association
- Legal status: Defunct
- Purpose: Grain growers cooperative
- Region served: Saskatchewan, Canada
- Products: Grain
- Official language: English

The Saskatchewan Grain Growers' Association (SGGA) was a farmer's association that was active in Saskatchewan, Canada in the early 20th century. It was a successor to the Territorial Grain Growers' Association, and was formed in 1906 after Saskatchewan became a province. It provided a voice for farmers in their struggle with grain dealers and the railways, and was influential in obtaining favorable legislation. The association initially resisted calls to create a farmer-owned marketing company. Later it did support formation of the Saskatchewan Co-operative Elevator Company. The SGGA helped the Saskatchewan Wheat Pool, a cooperative marketing organization, to become established in 1924. In 1926 the SGGA merged with the more radical Farmers' Union of Canada, which had earlier split from the SGGA, to create the United Farmers of Canada,

== Background ==
The Manitoba Grain Act was passed in 1901, designed to prevent abuses by grain dealers and railways and ensure fair practices and prices in the booming grain trade in the prairie provinces of Canada. There was a bumper crop that year, and farmers found they could not get their produce to market because the Canadian Pacific Railway (CPR) and the grain companies were still failing to conform to the act. Almost half the crop was lost due to spoilage due to lack of space in the elevators and lack of railway cars. In November 1901 two farmers in the major grain shipping center of Indian Head organized an "indignation meeting" that was attended by about fifty farmers.

In December 1901 William Richard Motherwell (1860–1943) and Peter Dayman of the Abernathy district arranged a follow-up meeting. The farmers agreed to form a Territorial Grain Growers' Association (TGGA), and nominated Motherwell as provisional president and John Millar as provisional secretary. The first annual convention of the TGGA was held on 1 February 1902, attended by delegates from 38 local groups. In 1905 Alberta and Saskatchewan became provinces. The Alberta branch of the TGGA became the Alberta Farmers' Association under the leadership of Rice Sheppard of the Strathcona area.

== History ==
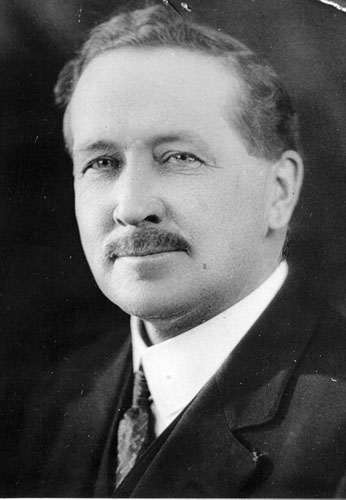
John Archibald Maharg (1872–1944), first president of the SGGA

In 1906 the TGGA renamed itself the Saskatchewan Grain Growers' Association (SGGA). John Archibald Maharg (1872–1944) was first president of the SGGA from 1910 to 1923. Edward Alexander Partridge of Sintaluta spoke at the SGGA convention that year, and attacked the grain handling system. He said the elevator companies, millers and exporters rigged grain prices so they were low during the fall harvest period, when farmers had to sell to obtain cash to pay their debts. They then made future contracts to the English buyers for delivery at far higher prices. The leaders of the SGGA were opposed to Partridge's plan to establish a farmer-owned company, but he ignored their objections. The organization meeting for the Grain Growers' Grain Company (GGGC) was held in Sintaluta on 27 January 1906.

Partridge helped organize the Grain Growers' Guide, a farmers' journal. The first issue appeared in June 1908 as the official organ of the Manitoba Grain Growers' Association (MGGA). It was published by the Grain Growers' Grain Company through its subsidiary, Public Press Limited. In 1909 the Guide was made a weekly. By the end of that year the Guide was the official organ of the (MGGA) and its sister associations, the SGGA and the United Farmers of Alberta (UFA).

Early in 1908 Partridge convinced the SGGA to endorse the principle that inland grain elevators should be owned by the province and terminal elevators by the Dominion of Canada. Saskatchewan premier Thomas Walter Scott arranged for a Royal Commission on Elevators in 1910, which recommended a system where the elevators would be cooperatively owned by the farmers rather than by the government. In 1911 legislation was passed by which the Saskatchewan Co-operative Elevator Company (SCEC) was incorporated to run elevators under this model. The SCEC was a joint-stock cooperative company whose shares would be sold only to farmers, who could not buy more than ten shares each. The SCEC was closely aligned with the SGGA and with the Liberal Party of Saskatchewan. John Archibald Maharg, president of the SCEC, was also president of the SGGA, and in 1921 was provincial minister of agriculture in the Liberal government.

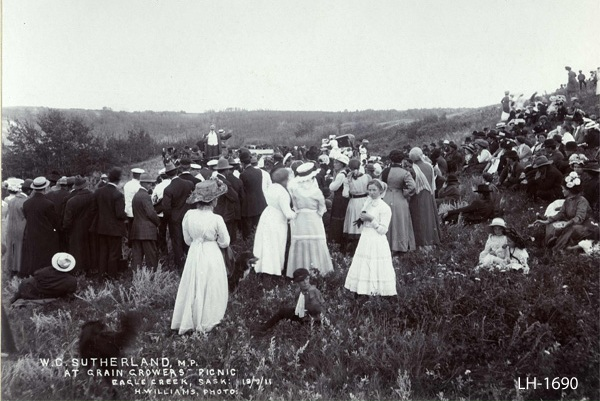
William Charles Sutherland (Liberal MP) addresses a Saskatchewan Grain Growers' Picnic at Eagle Creek on 19 July 1911

The SCEC's relationship with the Liberals drew criticism from those who felt that a cooperative should be politically neutral, particularly from those who did not support the Liberals. In 1921 a left-wing splinter group left the SGGA to form the Farmers' Union of Canada.

Early in 1924 wheat pool organizers, inspired by their success in Alberta, began campaigns to sign up farmers in Saskatchewan and Alberta. The two farm organizations in Saskatchewan lent the pool funds, and the provincial government provided a CAN$45,000 advance. By 6 June 1924 the pool in Saskatchewan had signed up 46,500 contracts covering more than half the acreage in the province. The pool incorporated as the Saskatchewan Co-Operative Wheat Producers. The SCEC raised difficulties about letting the pool use its elevators, and the pool made other arrangements. A special meeting of SCEC members in April 1926 voted to sell to the pool, which took over all the SCEC facilities.

== Merger ==
Partridge campaigned for the Canadian Wheat Board, dissolved in 1920, to be reestablished. He did not succeed, but his campaign led to the creation in 1926 of the Saskatchewan section of the United Farmers of Canada. The United Farmers of Canada was created by a merger of the more radical Farmers' Union of Canada with the Saskatchewan Grain Growers Association. The first leader of the UFC was George Williams. Partridge was made honorary president of the organization.

== Sources ==
- "Archives of United Grain Growers". Archives of the Agricultural Experience. University of Manitoba. Archived from the original on 2016-01-26.
- Dale-Burnett, Lisa Lynne (2006). Saskatchewan Agriculture: Lives Past and Present. University of Regina Press. ISBN 978-0-88977-169-7.
- Dale-Burnett, Lisa (2014). "MAHARG, JOHN ARCHIBALD (1872– 1944)". Encyclopedia of Saskatchewan. University of Regina.
- Dick, Lyle (2008). Farmers "making Good": The Development of Abernethy District, Saskatchewan, 1880-1920. University of Calgary Press. ISBN 978-1-55238-241-7.
- Fairbairn, Brett (2014). "SASKATCHEWAN CO-OPERATIVE ELEVATOR COMPANY (SCEC)". Encyclopedia of Saskatchewan. University of Regina.
- Freeman, Barbara M. (2011-12-14). Beyond Bylines: Media Workers and Women's Rights in Canada. Wilfrid Laurier Univ. Press. ISBN 978-1-55458-313-3.
- Jaques, Carrol L. (2001). Unifarm: A Story of Conflict & Change. University of Calgary Press. ISBN 978-1-55238-051-2.
- Kelcey, Barabara E.; Davis, Angela E. (1997). A Great Movement Underway: Women and The Grain Growers' Guide (1908-1928) (PDF). Winnipeg: Manitoba Record Society. ISBN 9780969210153.
- Knuttila, Kenneth Murray (1994). That Man Partridge: E.A. Partidge, His Thoughts and Times. University of Regina Press. ISBN 978-0-88977-079-9.
- Knuttila, Murray (2011). "Grain Growers Associations". Encyclopedia of the Great Plains. University of Nebraska–Lincoln.
- Knuttila, K. Murray (2014). "PARTRIDGE, EDWARD ALEXANDER". Dictionary of Canadian Biography.
- Lipset, Seymour Martin (1971-01-01). Agrarian Socialism: The Cooperative Commonwealth Federation in Saskatchewan : a Study in Political Sociology. University of California Press. ISBN 978-0-520-02056-6.
- MacPherson, Ian (2006-02-07). "United Farmers of Canada". Encyclopedia of Canada. Historica Canada.
- Marchildon, Gregory P. (2011). Agricultural History. University of Regina Press. ISBN 978-0-88977-237-3.
- Solberg, Carl E. (1985). The Prairies and the Pampas: Agrarian Policy in Canada and Argentina, 1880-1930. Stanford University Press. ISBN 978-0-8047-6565-7.
- Taylor, Georgina (1991). "Saskatchewan". In Heaps, Leo (ed.). Our Canada. Toronto: James Lorimer & Company. ISBN 9781550283532.
