= The Grain Growers' Guide =

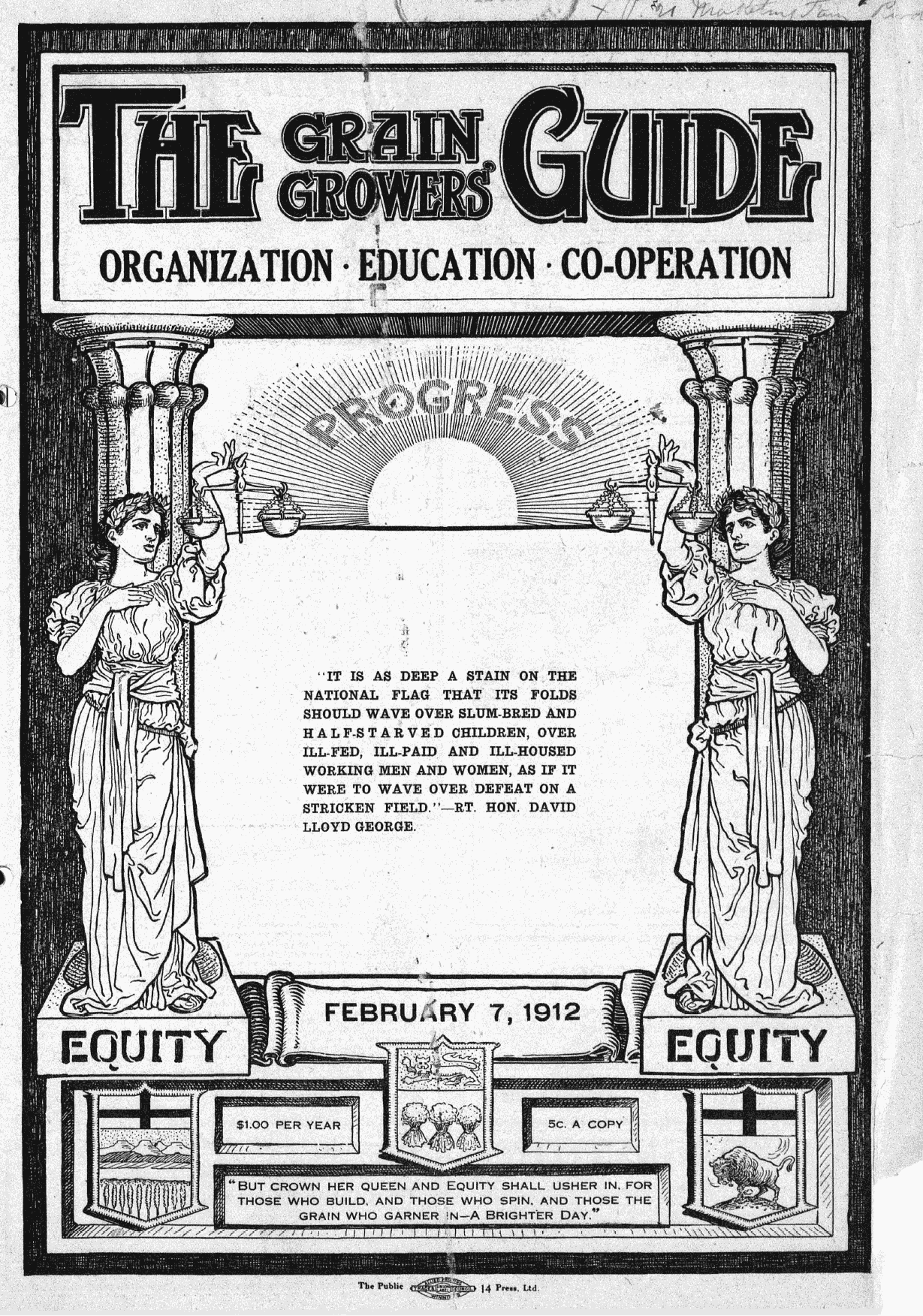
- Cover of the 7 February 1912 issue of The Grain Growers' Guide
- Publisher: Grain Growers' Grain Company, United Grain Growers
- Founded: 1908
- Ceased publication: 1936
- ISSN: 0383-7157

The Grain Growers' Guide (later called the Country Guide) was a newspaper published by the Grain Growers' Grain Company (GGGC) in Western Canada for grain farmers between 1908 and 1936. It reflected the views of the grain growers' associations. In its day it had the highest circulation of any farm paper in the region.

== Foundation ==
The agrarian activist Edward Alexander Partridge felt that the press had given unfair treatment of the struggle in 1906–07 to get the Grain Growers' Grain Company (GGGC) off the ground, and helped organize a farmers' publication. The first issue of The Grain Growers' Guide appeared in June 1908, as the official organ of the Manitoba Grain Growers' Association (MGGA). It was edited by Partridge. It was published by the Grain Growers' Grain Company through its subsidiary, Public Press Limited.

== History ==
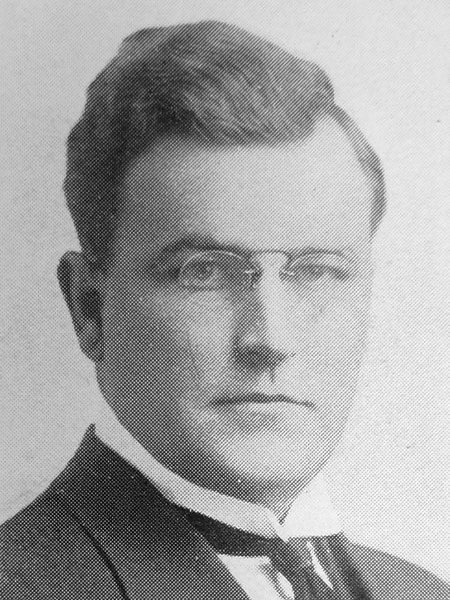
George Fisher Chipman (1882–1935), editor for most of the guide's history

Partridge thought the guide should be a militant paper, but did not have support for this view from the co-founders. He resigned after the first issue. Roderick McKenzie was editor until 1911. In 1909 the guide was made a weekly, and George Fisher Chipman was appointed associate editor. Chipman edited the guide from 1911 until 1928, and its successor The Country Guide until 1935.

Partridge and Thomas Crerar of Manitoba attended the January 1909 convention where the Alberta Farmers' Association merged with the Canadian Society of Equity to form the United Farmers of Alberta (UFA). Before the merger the AFA's official organ was the Homestead, and the CSE published The Great West. At the urging of Partridge and Crerar these papers were absorbed by The Grain Growers' Guide. By 1909 the guide was the official organ of the (MGGA) and its sister associations, the Saskatchewan Grain Growers' Association (SGGA) and the UFA.

In 1917 the GGGC merged with the Alberta Farmers' Co-operative Elevator Company, founded in 1913, to form the United Grain Growers (UGG), which provided grain marketing, handling and supply until 2001. By 1918 the guide was the largest farm publication on the prairies by circulation. The guide was issued as the Country Guide from volume 21, number 7 (2 April 1928) to volume 29, number 5 (May 1936). In 1936 the paper was merged with The Nor'west farmer to form The country guide and Nor-west farmer.

== Contents ==
The guide was tightly controlled by the parent company and the associations of grain growers, who ensured that it was independent of political parties. The guide covered topics of interest to western Canada prairie farmers including politics, cooperative associations, animal husbandry and new agricultural techniques. The paper became an essential source of information about the outside world to prairie farmers. Readers were encouraged to give their views, and the letters page became an important part of the paper. The guide advocated reform of rural education and supported the temperance movement, the cooperative movement and the Social Gospel. It became a supporter of the Progressive Party. As the Progressive movement waned in the 1920s the guide devoted less space to reform topics and focused on practical issues of rural life and entertainment for rural families.

The founders and editors were in favour of women's suffrage, but accepted the traditional view of separate men's and women's spheres of activity. The guide included a woman's page from its first year, which discussed suffrage, equal rights, dower law and homesteading. The woman's page later included a readers' forum, advice on managing a household, and opinions on marriage, motherhood, women's work and finances. Separately the paper covered activities in the women's departments of the Grain Growers' Associations. Later the guide started to publish a "household number" that was mainly devoted to domestic topics, but the parent newspaper continued to publish its woman's page.

The women's page editors from 1908 to 1928 were Isobel Graham, Mary Ford, Francis Marion Beynon, Mary P. McCallum, and Amy J. Roe. Other well-known women wrote letters or gave commentaries, including Ella Cora Hind, Nellie McClung, and Irene Parlby. All the editors were social feminists who believed that women had accepted responsibility for caring for the home and children, but that they should be educated, have property rights and have a voice in political debates.
