= Edward Alexander Partridge =

Canadian teacher and farmer (1861-1931)

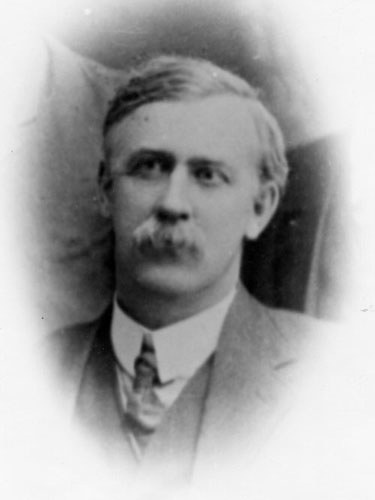
- Partridge as a younger man
- Born: 5 November 1861; Vespra Township, Canada West
- Died: 3 August 1931 (aged 69); Victoria, British Columbia, Canada
- Occupations: Teacher; farmer; agrarian radical; businessman; author
- Known for: Grain Growers' Grain Company

Edward Alexander Partridge (5 November 1861 – 3 August 1931) was a Canadian teacher, farmer, agrarian radical, businessman and author. Known in political circles as "Partridge of Sintaluta, " he was active in the Territorial Grain Growers' Association (TGGA) and an early form of the United Grain Growers. He was a frequent contributor to the Grain Growers' Guide and author of several books on agrarian issues and political reform.

He was born in Ontario but moved to Saskatchewan where he taught and then became a farmer. He was active in the Territorial Grain Growers' Association (TGGA), founded in 1902, which addressed various problems with the Western Canada grain market. He founded the cooperative Grain Growers' Grain Company, the predecessor of the United Grain Growers, and the Grain Growers' Guide, a widely distributed weekly paper. His "Partridge Plan" was a broad and visionary proposal for addressing a wide range of farmers' issues, eliminating many abuses caused by the near-monopoly of grain elevator companies, and resulted in important reforms by the provincial governments. Patridge was named a National Historic Person in 2018.

== Early career ==
Edward Alexander Partridge was born on 5 November 1861 near Crown Hill, Springwater then in Canada West. He was the third son in a farming family. His parents were John Thomas Partridge and Martha Chappell. There were fourteen children altogether in the family. His father's parents had emigrated from New York State in 1819 and settled to the northeast of Barrie, Ontario. Partridge's mother died while he was an infant, and he lived with his grandparents for a period while he attended public school. He completed secondary school in Barrie and obtained a teacher's certificate. He taught for a period, then in December 1883 moved west with his brother to attempt farming in the District of Assiniboia.

They settled at the hamlet and railway station of Sintaluta, now in Saskatchewan but then in the North-West Territories. Unable to afford the equipment and supplies he needed to operate a farm, Partridge returned to teaching. He taught near Broadview, at Saltcoats and at Maple Green near Lemberg. He served in the Yorkton Militia from April to June 1885 during the North-West Rebellion. In 1886, he married Mary Elizabeth Stephens in Balcarres, Saskatchewan, and they began a farm. They had three daughters and two sons.

== Territorial Grain Growers' Association ==
Farmers formed the Territorial Grain Growers' Association (TGGA) in January 1902 to help them fight abuse by the grain dealers and railways. The TGGA had succeeded in getting the Manitoba Grain Act amended to eliminate the main abuses by 1903. With the passage of the amendments to the act it had achieved its primary objective, and lost some of its momentum. Partridge began to push the TGGA members to demand tighter control of the grading system and inspection of elevators. He also proposed a cooperative grain trading company owned by the farmers, a newspaper to help communication and greater involvement by farmers in political issues.

== Grain Growers' Grain Company ==
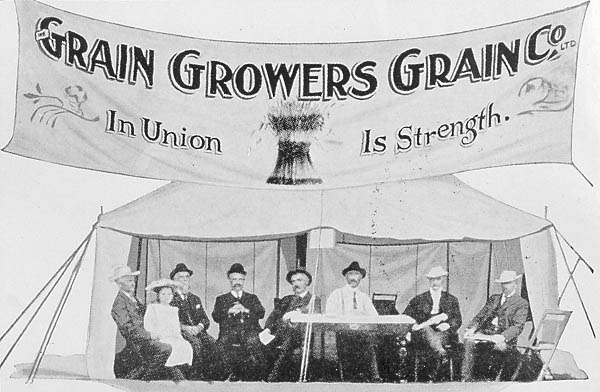
Early GGGC booth

The Sintaluta Local was concerned about the operation of the Winnipeg Grain Exchange. They persuaded the federal government to appoint a "watchdog" to make sure that the exchange was treating grain growers fairly, and they sent Partridge to Winnipeg in January–February 1905 to observe the exchange. He was treated poorly and became convinced that the exchange was not interested in the farmers, who needed their own grain company. For his observations of the Grain Exchange he earned the nickname "That Man Partridge." Patridge spoke at the SGGA convention in 1906, and attacked the grain handling system. He said that the elevator companies, millers and exporters rigged the grain prices so they were low during the fall harvest period, when farmers had to sell to obtain cash to pay their debts. They then made future contracts to the English buyers for delivery at far higher prices. Many of his audience were convinced by his argument.

On 27 January 1906 the Grain Growers' Grain Company (GGGC) was founded as a cooperative company to handle marketing of the grain, under Partridge's leadership. The GGGC found itself engaged in a lengthy struggle with the existing grain companies over its seats on the Winnipeg Grain Exchange. It was expelled for paying patronage dividends to its member clients, then reinstated when the Manitoba Grain Growers' Association MGGA exerted pressure on the government of Rodmond Roblin. The president of the MGGA, D.W. McCuaig, sued three of the exchange's members for combining to obstruct trade.

Partridge resigned as president of the GGGC at the 1907 convention, in part because the company's original cooperative structure had been modified to meet the requirements of the Grain Exchange, in part because he was not interested in running the company he had launched. In 1908 Partridge lost a leg in an accident.

== Grain Growers' Guide ==
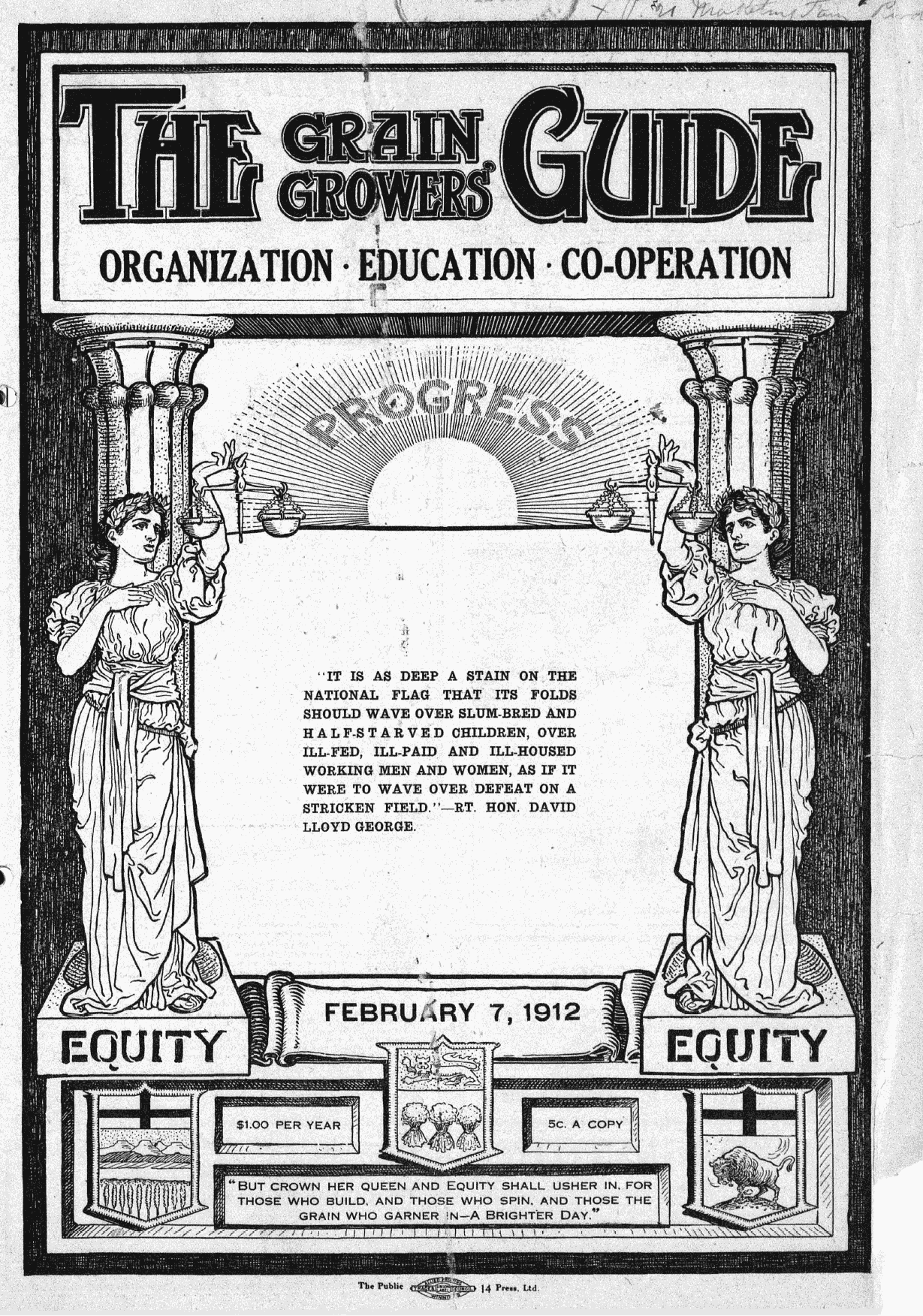
Grain Growers' Guide Cover (7 February 1912)

Partridge felt that the press had given unfair treatment of the struggle to get the GGGC off the ground, and helped organize a farmers' publication. The Grain Growers' Guide first appeared in 1908, edited by Partridge. It was published by the Grain Growers' Grain Company through its subsidiary, Public Press Limited. The Guide represented the interests of the MGGA and its sister organizations the Saskatchewan Grain Growers' Association (SGGA) and the United Farmers of Alberta (UFA). Partridge thought the guide should be a militant paper, but was not supported in this view. He resigned after the first issue.

Partridge and Thomas Crerar of Manitoba attended the January 1909 convention where the Alberta Farmers' Association merged with the Canadian Society of Equity to form the United Farmers of Alberta. Before the merger the AFA's official organ was the Homestead, and the CSE published The Great West. At his urging, these papers were absorbed by the Grain Growers' Guide.

== Partridge Plan ==
Partridge pushed for reform of the terminal and elevator business. Under pressure, the government appointed SGGA secretary John Millar to lead a Commission to investigate the system. The Millar Commission uncovered evidence of abuse by grain dealers. It called for better regulation, rather than government intervention. Despite this, Partridge led a campaign to nationalize the elevators in the grain terminals.

Early in 1908 Partridge convinced the SGGA to endorse the principle that inland grain elevators should be owned by the province and terminal elevators by the Dominion of Canada. The Manitoba association passed a resolution supporting this proposal at their convention. Soon after being launched, the Guide published the "Partridge Plan", in which Partridge proposed that grain elevators should be owned by the public, a position already accepted by the SGGA. The premiers of the three Prairie provinces all took an interest in the plan, although Alberta and Saskatchewan preferred cooperative ownership to public ownership.

The Partridge Plan covered a wide range of agrarian issues, although in a somewhat confused manner. Most SGGA members were enthusiastic about it. The plan covered grain handling, the grain blockade, farm credit and market speculation. It identified and proposed remedies for practices by the elevator companies such as excessive dockage fees, light weights, refusing to bin special grain, replacing special binned grain with lower-quality grain, and preventing farmers who had bought storage space in an elevator from dealing with non-company buyers. All these abuses, derived from the practical monopoly position held by large grain handlers, could be eliminated by the government taking over local elevators.

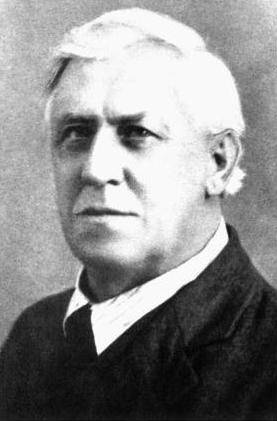
Patridge later in life

Partridge saw a conflict between the dual role of the elevator companies in storing and selling grain and believed it would be resolved if the elevators were strictly handling and storage facilities. He also addressed the problems of smaller farmers by proposing to combine wagon lots of equal quality grain into car lots. The farmer would be given an advance of up to half the total value, and a share of the price received when the car lot was sold. This anticipated the practice later adopted by the Wheat Pools and Wheat Board.

Partridge also proposed that the government build increased storage facilities so that farmers were not forced to sell as soon as the harvest was over, but could wait until prices rose the following spring or summer.

The grading system unduly emphasized color and weight of the kernel rather than the milled value, and encouraged mixing at the terminal elevators. Partridge proposed to replace this by a market where buyers could make their offer based on visual inspection of the grain being sold, eliminating the need for grading and letting sellers and buyers interact directly. The goal was to eliminate speculation in grain futures, with exporters buying stored grain only as needed based on samples.

The far-reaching reform proposals of the Partridge Plan thus addressed a wide range of farmer's concerns.

== Other activities ==
In 1909 Partridge attended the annual meeting of the Dominion Grange, where the western grain grower's associations and the Farmers' Association of Ontario established the Canadian Council of Agriculture. He was enthusiastic about a proposal to send a large delegation of farmers to Ottawa to present their views to the government of Wilfrid Laurier. On 16 December 1910 Partridge was among the delegation of from 850 to 1,000 farmers who marched on the House of Commons. They were allowed to enter the House and present their briefs. This event became known as the "Siege of Ottawa".

In 1912 Partridge left the GGGC during a dispute about a speculative purchase that one of the executives had made. He felt that Thomas Alexander Crerar, the president of the GGGC, should be forced to leave. Partridge tried to launch another grain company, but was not successful.

On 14 June 1914 Partridge's daughter Mary drowned in a swimming accident. During World War I (1914–18) both of his sons enlisted, and later died.

In 1916 the GGGC directors started to remit money to Partridge.

In 1919 Partridge resumed public activity when he opposed the candidacy of William Richard Motherwell, who was the Liberal candidate in a federal by-election in Assiniboia. Motherwell was a past president of the TGGA and had opposed the Partridge Plan.

In the 1921 general election Partridge was almost nominated candidate for the Progressive Party in Qu'Appelle, Saskatchewan.

The Canadian Wheat Board was dissolved in 1920. Partridge campaigned for it to be reestablished. He did not succeed, but his campaign led to the creation in 1926 of the Saskatchewan section of the United Farmers of Canada. Partridge was made honorary president of the organization.

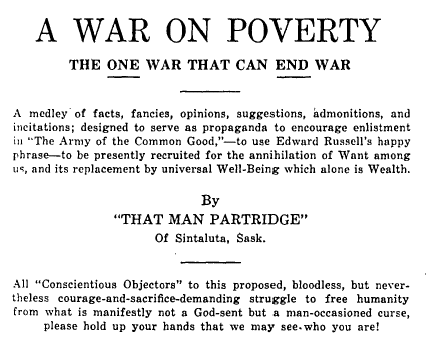
A War on Poverty (1925) title page

Partridge came to believe that cooperation among farmers was not enough to solve the problems of wasteful competition and the accumulation of wealth in private hands.

In 1925 he self-published a major book, A war on poverty: the one war that can end war, in which he violently attacked capitalism and supported the poor and underpaid. The book has many references to the Supreme Being, and reflects his profound belief in the Social Gospel. Partridge decried government-protected capitalists such as Gordon McGregor and Wallace Campbell who continued "to prey upon that part of the poor bedevilled Canadian public who can't escape to the United States". He was deeply influenced by John Ruskin's social ideals, and by social Darwinism and Christian socialism. His book calls for a co-operative commonwealth to be established in Western Canada. It includes a section called "Coalsamao" in which he describes this future utopian state from an insider's viewpoint.

In 1925 Partridge's wife died from a heart attack. In 1926 Partridge moved to a room in a boarding house in Victoria, British Columbia to be near his youngest daughter. With no money apart from the small, monthly $75 UGG stipend, in poor health, and despairing of achieving further reforms, Partridge committed suicide on 3 August 1931. He was 69 years old. Ironically, the Co-operative Commonwealth Federation party was founded just a year later, expressing many of the reforms that he had campaigned for.

== Publications ==
- Manifesto of the No-Party League of Western Canada (Winnipeg, 1913)
- National wheat marketing (n.p., [1921?])
- A war on poverty: the one war that can end war (Winnipeg, [1925]).

== Sources ==
- Dale-Burnett, Lisa Lynne (2006). Saskatchewan Agriculture: Lives Past and Present. University of Regina Press. ISBN 978-0-88977-169-7.
- Dick, Lyle (2008). Farmers "making Good": The Development of Abernethy District, Saskatchewan, 1880-1920. University of Calgary Press. ISBN 978-1-55238-241-7.
- Fairbairn, Brett (2014). "UNITED GRAIN GROWERS (AGRICORE UNITED)". Encyclopedia of Saskatchewan=.
- Freeman, Barbara M. (2011-12-14). Beyond Bylines: Media Workers and Women's Rights in Canada. Wilfrid Laurier Univ. Press. ISBN 978-1-55458-313-3.
- Goldsborough, Gordon (2013-08-08). "United Farmers of Manitoba [Manitoba Grain Growers Association]". Manitoba Historical Society.
- Ketterer, David (1992-01-01). Canadian Science Fiction and Fantasy. Indiana University Press. p. 19. ISBN 0-253-33122-6.
- Knuttila, Kenneth Murray (1994). That Man Partridge: E.A. Partidge, His Thoughts and Times. University of Regina Press. p. 14. ISBN 978-0-88977-079-9.
- Knuttila, K. Murray (2014). "PARTRIDGE, EDWARD ALEXANDER". Dictionary of Canadian Biography.
- Knuttila, Murray (2014b). "PARTRIDGE, EDWARD ALEXANDER (1861– 1931)". The Encyclopedia of Saskatchewan.
- MacDonald, Alex (2007). Cloud-capped Towers: The Utopian Theme in Saskatchewan History and Culture. University of Regina Press. ISBN 978-0-88977-204-5.
- Marchildon, Gregory P. (2011). Agricultural History. University of Regina Press. ISBN 978-0-88977-237-3.
- Roberts, David (2006). In the Shadow of Detroit: Gordon M. McGregor, Ford of Canada, and Motoropolis. Wayne State University Press. ISBN 0-8143-3284-6.
- Sherman, Patricia (2014). "Manitoba Grain Act".
- Thamer, J.H. (1909-01-20). "The Farmers of Alberta United" (PDF). The Great West. II (19). Archived from the original (PDF) on 2014-09-14.
- Thomas, Lewis H. (1984-01-01). The Making of a Socialist: Recollections of T. C. Douglas. University of Alberta. ISBN 978-0-88864-082-6.
