= Territorial Grain Growers' Association =

- Successor: Alberta Farmers' Association and Saskatchewan Grain Growers' Association
- Formation: 1901
- Founder: William Richard Motherwell
- Dissolved: 1906
- Type: Trade association
- Legal status: Defunct
- Purpose: Grain growers cooperative
- Location: Saskatchewan
- Region served: Saskatchewan and Alberta, Canada
- Products: Grain
- Official language: English

The Territorial Grain Growers' Association (TGGA) was a farmer's association that was active in Western Canada at the start of the 20th century, in what was then the Northwest Territories and later became Saskatchewan and Alberta. It provided a voice for farmers in their struggle with grain dealers and the railways, and was influential in obtaining favorable legislation. After Alberta and Saskatchewan became provinces the TGGA was succeeded by the Alberta Farmers' Association and the Saskatchewan Grain Growers' Association.

== Background ==
At the start of the 20th century the North-West Elevator Association, closely associated with the Winnipeg Grain Exchange, controlled over two thirds of the grain elevators on the prairies. The elevator companies, working together, could force the farmers to accept low prices for their grain. When there were shortages of rail cars the railways gave preferential treatment to the companies over the farmers. The 1908 "Partridge Plan" listed other "ill practices" that included "the taking of heavy dockage, the giving of light weight, misgrading the farmers' grain sold on the street or graded into store, failure to provide cleaning apparatus, changing the identity of the farmers' special binned grain, declining to allot space for special binning and refusing to ship grain to owner's order, even when storage charges are tended.

== Foundation ==
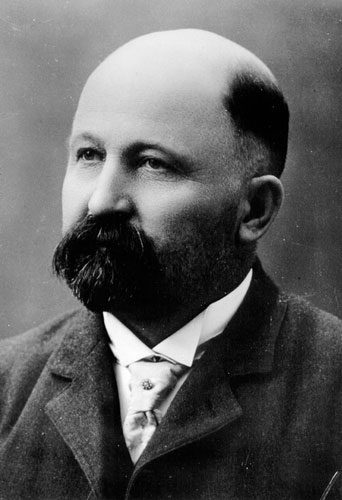
William Richard Motherwell (1860–1943), founder of the TGGA

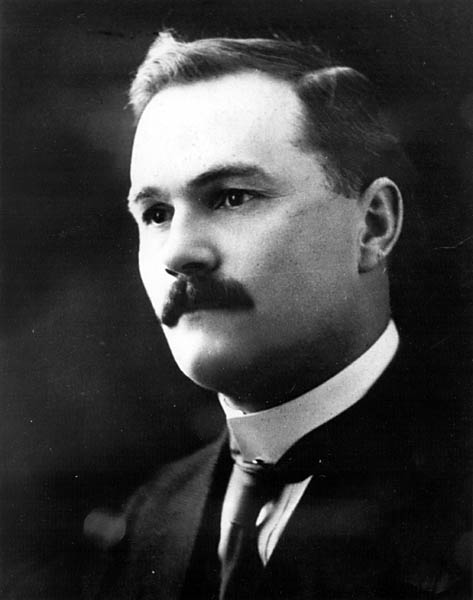
Charles Avery Dunning (1885–1958)

The Manitoba Grain Act was passed in 1901, designed to prevent these abuses and ensure fair practices and prices in the booming grain trade in the prairie provinces of Canada. There was a bumper crop that year, and farmers found they could not get their produce to market because the Canadian Pacific Railway (CPR) and the grain companies were still failing to conform to the act. Almost half the crop was lost due to spoilage due to lack of space in the elevators and lack of railway cars. In November 1901 two farmers in the major grain shipping center of Indian Head, John Sibbold and John A. Millar, organized an "indignation meeting" that was attended by about fifty farmers. The group united in "opposition to the corporations which they stigmatized as their oppressors".

In December 1901 William Richard Motherwell (1860–1943) and Peter Dayman of the Abernathy district arranged a follow-up to the Indian Head meeting. The farmers agree to form a Territorial Grain Growers' Association (TGGA), and nominated Motherwell as provisional president and John Millar as provisional secretary. A meeting was held on 6 January 1902 to draw up a constitution for the association. Motherwell and Matthew Snow of Wolseley began touring the region and encouraging farmers to form local TGGA associations. The first annual convention of the TGGA was held on 1 February 1902, attended by delegates from 38 local groups. By this time the TGGA membership was 500. To ensure that it could speak for all farmers, the TGGA was careful to avoid association with any political party. The provisional officers were confirmed at the February meeting. Charles Avery Dunning (1885–1958), later to become Premier of Saskatchewan, was appointed a director of the TGGA and later became vice-president.

== Grain Act amendments ==
The delegates at the February meeting approved three recommendations proposed by Motherwell for changes to the Grain Act. These were:

That section 42 of the Manitoba Grain Act be amended to empower the Warehouse Commissioner to compel all railway companies to erect every loading platform approved by the said Commissioner within thirty days after said approval is given and in defaul the Commissioner shall have power to impose penalties on such defaulting railway, and collect same through the courts, and that this amendment come into force on May 1, 1902.

That railway companies be compelled to provide farmers with cars to be loaded direct from vehicles, at all stations, irrespective of there being an elevator, warehouse or loading platform at such station of not.

That the Grain Act be amended making it the duty of the railway agent, when there is a shortage of cars, to apportion the available cars in the order in which they are applied for, and that in case such cars are misappropriated by applicants not entitled to them, the penalties of the act be enforced against such parties.

The recommendations were debated in the House of Commons on 17 March 1902 and passed as amendments to the Manitoba Grain Act with little modification on 19 May 1902. The act was also amended to require the CPR to cover the cost of land and sidings when anyone within forty miles of a siding applied to build a flat warehouse, and to build a loading platform when ten farmers formally applied for one. However, the act did not ensure enforcement, and during the bumper harvest of 1902 there was again a shortage of cars, and CPR was clearly favoring the elevator companies in allocation of the available cars. Motherwell and Peter Dayman went to Winnipeg to complain to CPR, where they were told that the railway was having difficulty adapting to the rapid growth in wheat production.

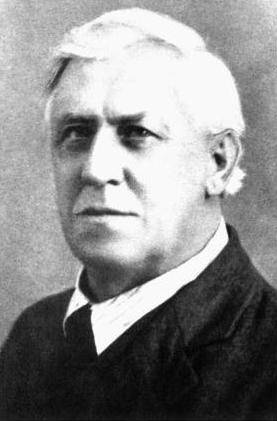
Edward Alexander Partridge (1861-1931)

There was no visible improvement in the situation, and after a few months the TGGA presented a formal complaint against the CPR's Sintaluta agent before the Warehouse Commissioner. On 28 November the Commissioner looked into the case and started court proceedings. The defendant was found guilty given a fine of CDN$50 plus costs, or one month in jail. CPR appealed the decision but lost in the Supreme Court of the North-West Territories. Immediately after the decision farmers found that CPR was making cars much more readily available. An account written in 1918 said,

At once the newspapers all over the country were full of it. Oracles of bar-room and barber-shop nodded their heads wisely; hadn't they said that even the CPR couldn't win against organized farmers, backed up by the law of the land? Away East the news was magnified till it became: "The farmers out West have licked the CPR in court and are threatening to tear up the tracks!"

The Manitoba Grain Growers' Association (MGGA) was formed at a meeting on March 3–4, 1903 in Brandon, Manitoba. In 1903 two officers of the MGGA accompanied Motherwell and J.B. Gillespie of the TGGA to Ottawa where they met with representatives of the railways and grain companies to tighten up the wording of the Manitoba Grain Act. The new text was introduced as an amendment to the act which was passed that year. With the passage of the amendments to the act the TGGA had achieved its primary objective, and lost some of its momentum.

== Later activity ==
Edward Alexander Partridge of Sintaluta, began to push the TGGA members to demand tighter control of the grading system and inspection of elevators. The Sintaluta Local was concerned about the operation of the Winnipeg Grain Exchange. They persuaded the federal government to appoint a "watchdog" to make sure that the exchange was treating grain growers fairly, and they sent Partridge to Winnipeg in January–February 1905 to observe the exchange. He was treated poorly and became convinced that the exchange was not interested in the farmers, who needed their own grain company. On 27 January 1906 the Grain Growers' Grain Company (GGGC) was founded as a cooperative company to handle marketing of the grain, under the Partidge's leadership. This was the start of a new struggle with the elevator companies.

In 1905 Alberta and Saskatchewan became provinces. The Alberta branch of the TGGA became the Alberta Farmers' Association under the leadership of Rice Sheppard of the Strathcona area. In 1906 the TGGA renamed itself the Saskatchewan Grain Growers' Association (SGGA). In 1909 the Alberta Farmers' Association combined with the American Society of Equity, another Alberta group, to form the United Farmers of Alberta (UFA). Motherwell would eventually become provincial minister of agriculture and then federal minister of agriculture.

== Sources ==
- Dale-Burnett, Lisa Lynne (2006). "Charles Avery Dunning (1885-1958)". Saskatchewan Agriculture: Lives Past and Present. University of Regina Press. ISBN 978-0-88977-169-7.
- Dick, Lyle (2008). Farmers "making Good": The Development of Abernethy District, Saskatchewan, 1880-1920. University of Calgary Press. ISBN 978-1-55238-241-7.
- Earl, Paul D. (2000-01-01). Mac Runciman: A Life in the Grain Trade. Univ. of Manitoba Press. ISBN 978-0-88755-338-7.
- Goldsborough, Gordon (2013-08-08). "United Farmers of Manitoba [Manitoba Grain Growers Association]". Manitoba Historical Society.
- Jaques, Carrol L. (2001). Unifarm: A Story of Conflict & Change. University of Calgary Press. ISBN 978-1-55238-051-2.
- Knuttila, Kenneth Murray (1994). That Man Partridge: E.A. Partidge, His Thoughts and Times. University of Regina Press. ISBN 978-0-88977-079-9.
- Knuttila, Murray (2011). "Grain Growers Associations". Encyclopedia of the Great Plains. University of Nebraska–Lincoln.
- Marchildon, Gregory P. (2011-10-01). Business and Industry. University of Regina Press. ISBN 978-0-88977-238-0.
- Sherman, Patricia (2014). "Manitoba Grain Act".
- Solberg, Carl E. (1985). The Prairies and the Pampas: Agrarian Policy in Canada and Argentina, 1880-1930. Stanford University Press. ISBN 978-0-8047-6565-7.
