= Alberta Farmers' Association =

- Predecessor: Territorial Grain Growers' Association
- Successor: United Farmers of Alberta
- Formation: 1905
- Founder: Rice Sheppard
- Dissolved: 1909
- Type: Trade association
- Legal status: Defunct
- Purpose: Grain growers cooperative
- Location: Alberta
- Region served: Alberta, Canada
- Products: Grain
- Official language: English

The Alberta Farmers' Association (AFA) was a farmer's association that was active in Alberta, Canada from 1905 to 1909. It was formed from the Alberta branch of the Territorial Grain Growers' Association (TGGA) when Alberta became a province in 1905. It provided a voice for farmers in their struggle with grain dealers and the railways. In January 1909 it merged with the Canadian Society of Equity to form the United Farmers of Alberta.

== Background ==
The Manitoba Grain Act was passed in 1901, designed to prevent abuses by grain dealers and railways and ensure fair practices and prices in the booming grain trade in the prairie provinces of Canada. There was a bumper crop that year, and farmers found they could not get their produce to market because the Canadian Pacific Railway (CPR) and the grain companies were still failing to conform to the act. In response, farmers formed the Territorial Grain Growers' Association (TGGA) in January 1902. The TGGA had succeeded in getting the Manitoba Grain Act amended to eliminate the main abuses by 1903. With the passage of the amendments to the act it had achieved its primary objective, and lost some of its momentum.

== History ==
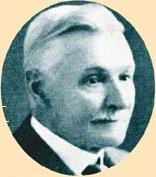
Rice Sheppard (1861–1947)

In 1905 Alberta and Saskatchewan became provinces. The Alberta branch of the TGGA became the Alberta Farmers' Association (AFA) under the leadership of Rice Sheppard (1861–1947) of the Strathcona area. Farmers who had moved to Alberta from the United States had formed an Alberta chapter of the American Society of Equity, with locals in Spruce Grove, Namao, Beaumont, Stony Plain and Poplar Lake. Around 1905 they changed the name of their organization to the Canadian Society of Equity (CSE).

This was a period of rapid growth in Alberta. The population rose from 73,000 in 1901 to 374,000 in 1911. By then there were 60,559 farms. The new farmers were often in debt for equipment and supplies. Farming was risky, with low rainfall, a short growing period and uncertain prices. The government, itself short of money, could not always provide the assistance the new farmers expected in bad periods, so the AFA and CSE were seen as a source of strength and safety. Their main ideological difference was that the CSE wanted to maintain "equity", or economic equality, by its members refusing to sell below a certain price. The AFA did not accept this radical approach of co-operative action. The AFA was, however, comfortable with asking for government assistance in grain storage and marketing.

James Speakman, who later became president of the United Farmers of Alberta, was president of the Innisfail branch of the AFA during the period when it was competing for members with the CSE. He was a strong supporter of union. In September 1908 the AFA and CSE formed a joint committee to draft a constitution for a combined organization. The last convention of the AFA and first convention of the UFA was held at Mechanic's Hall, Edmonton on January 13–15. AFA delegates ratified the merger on 14 January 1909, and the CSE joined them the next day. The two groups "extended the hand of good fellowship to all" and combined their operations. The new United Farmers of Alberta was not aligned with any political party or politician. Its goal was to further the interests of producers of grain and livestock and to obtain profitable prices for all of the products of farm and orchard through cooperative effort.

Before the merger the AFA's official organ was the Homestead, and the CSE published The Great West. Afterwards, at the urging of Edward Alexander Partridge of Saskatchewan and Thomas Crerar of Manitoba, these papers were absorbed by the Grain Growers' Guide, which already served Saskatchewan and Manitoba.

== Sources ==
- Balkan, Donna (October 2009). "United We Farm". Alberta Views. 12 (8). Archived from the original on 2014-09-14.
- Danysk, Cecilia (2014). "SPEAKMAN, JAMES". Dictionary of Canadian Biography. Vol. XIV. University of Toronto/Université Laval.
- Dick, Lyle (2008). Farmers "making Good": The Development of Abernethy District, Saskatchewan, 1880-1920. University of Calgary Press. ISBN 978-1-55238-241-7.
- Jaques, Carrol L. (2001). Unifarm: A Story of Conflict & Change. University of Calgary Press. ISBN 978-1-55238-051-2.
- Knuttila, Murray (2011). "Grain Growers Associations". Encyclopedia of the Great Plains. University of Nebraska–Lincoln.
- Solberg, Carl E. (1985). The Prairies and the Pampas: Agrarian Policy in Canada and Argentina, 1880-1930. Stanford University Press. ISBN 978-0-8047-6565-7.
- Thamer, J.H. (1909-01-20). "The Farmers of Alberta United" (PDF). The Great West. II (19). Archived from the original (PDF) on 2014-09-14.
- "The history of United Farmers of Alberta". Vermilion Standard. 2005-03-01. Archived from the original on 2014-09-14.
- "United Farmers of Alberta fonds". HeRMIS. Government of Alberta.
