= Manitoba Grain Act =

Repealed Act of Parliament of Canada

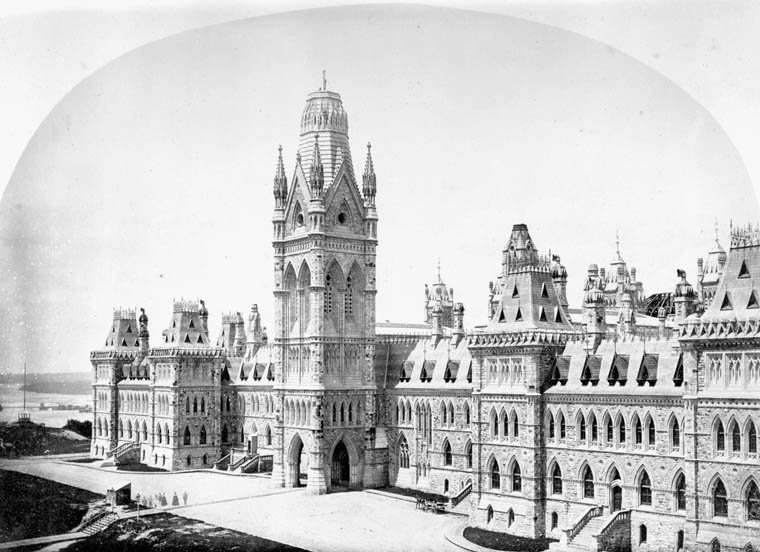

Parliament of Canada
- Enacted by: Government of Canada
- Enacted: 1900

Summary
- Regulations applying to storage, trade and shipping of grain
- Status: Repealed

The Manitoba Grain Act was an act passed by the federal government of Canada in 1900 to protect the interests of grain farmers against abuses by the grain storage and trading companies and the railways. Although well-intentioned the act was flawed, and a series of amendments were required before the more effective Canada Grain Act of 1912 was passed.

== Background ==
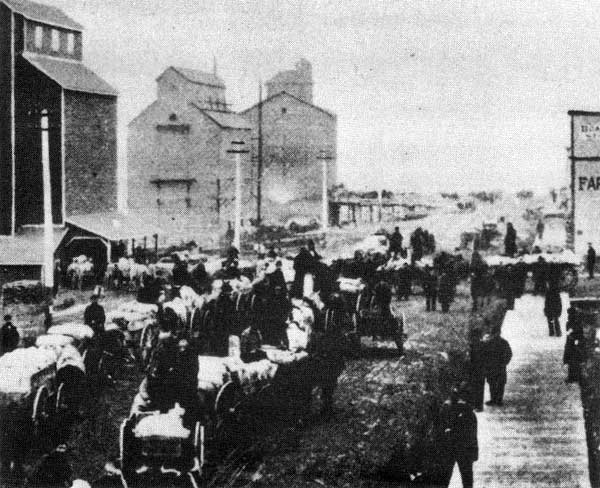
Wagons loaded with bags of grain, awaiting delivery to elevators in Brandon, circa 1888

After 1878 the governments of Canada implemented policies to encourage development of grain farming in the prairie province of Manitoba and the Northwest Territories of Saskatchewan, Assiniboia and Alberta. These included setting up protective tariffs, encouraging settlement on the prairies and building a transcontinental railway, the Canadian Pacific Railway (CPR). The agricultural community would produce cash crops for export, and would buy Canadian industrial products. There was inherent tension between the farmers, who wanted to get the highest possible price for their crops, and the grain dealers, who wanted to pay as little as possible.

By 1890 the grain traders had started to consolidate into large companies such as Ogilvie, Northern and Dominion. There were 447 working elevators in the prairie provinces in 1899. Of these 95 were owned by two large milling companies and 206 by three line elevator companies. 120 were owned by individual millers and grain companies, and 26 by farmer-owned companies. The farmers' elevators had difficulty obtaining sufficient volume for economies of scale in grain storage and handling. The large companies could force them out of business by paying excessive prices where the farmers operated elevators, balanced by lower prices elsewhere. The companies took large deductions from the farmers to allow for impurities in the grain (dockage), loss of grain during loading (shrinkage) and transportation costs. Farmers suspected they were colluding over prices, although this was not proved.

Farmers began to complain about the grain traders' practices, and the government established a Royal Commission to investigate the situation. The commission of 1899 held hearings in the main grain belt centers and market centers. The commission also reviewed the practices and regulations of the grain trade in Minnesota, and many features of the Minnesota legislation were included in the recommendations. The commission found, "a vendor of grain is at present subjected to an unfair and excessive dockage for his grain at the time of sale. ... doubts exist as to the fairness of the weights allowed or used by the owners of elevators." The commission said the elevator companies had an unfair monopoly "by refusing to permit the erection of flat warehouses where standard elevators are situated" so they could "keep the price of grain below its true market value to their own benefit." The report recommended legislation, "there being no rules laid down for the regulations of the grain trade other than those made by the railway companies and the elevator owners."

== Legislation ==
The Manitoba Grain Act was passed in 1900, a well-meaning effort to solve the problems identified by the Royal Commission. It was meant to regulate and supervise the trade in grain to ensure fair practices and fair prices. A Warehouse Commissioner was appointed to administer the statute. Grain handling facilities were required to be licensed. Rules and regulations covered dockage, weights, grades, and special binning. Section 18 of the act stated, "In no case, shall grain of different grades be mixed together while in store." This was to ensure that quality and thus prices were maintained. The provision was supported by the traders.

Recommendations incorporated into the act requiring the railways to provide loading platforms free of charge, giving farmers the right to build and use flat warehouses, with the railways forced to provide sites and sidings. The farmers were thus no longer forced to sell to elevators from which the grain would be bulk loaded. However, the farmers had to fill a car completely, which was beyond the capacity of many, and to load within a specified period of time. The loading regulation remained in force until 1970. The elevator companies were required to guarantee the grades of stored grain, and give statements of the grade and weight of all the grain they received.

== Results and amendments ==
Soon after passage of the act in 1900 the North West Elevator Association was organized by the grain dealers. Ostensibly the purpose was to provide an efficient method of deciding on grain prices and sending them to the managers of the local elevators, but the farmers saw the association as an anti-competitive cartel.

The act did not solve the farmers' problem. In 1901 there was a bumper crop in Western Canada. Farmers in the Northwest Territories found that the traders and CPR were not complying with the act. The railway companies were giving the elevator companies precedence over individual farmers in receiving cars, in effect forcing farmers to sell through the companies. About seventy farmers met in Indian Head, Saskatchewan in November 1901, resulting in the birth of the Territorial Grain Growers' Association (TGGA), a non-political lobby group. The delegates at the February 1902 meeting of the TGGA approved three recommendations proposed by William Richard Motherwell for changes to the Grain Act. These were:

That section 42 of the Manitoba Grain Act be amended to empower the Warehouse Commissioner to compel all railway companies to erect every loading platform approved by the said Commissioner within thirty days after said approval is given and in default the Commissioner shall have power to impose penalties on such defaulting railway, and collect same through the courts, and that this amendment come into force on May 1, 1902.

That railway companies be compelled to provide farmers with cars to be loaded direct from vehicles, at all stations, irrespective of there being an elevator, warehouse or loading platform at such station or not.

That the Grain Act be amended making it the duty of the railway agent, when there is a shortage of cars, to apportion the available cars in the order in which they are applied for, and that in case such cars are misappropriated by applicants not entitled to them, the penalties of the act be enforced against such parties.

The recommendations were debated in the House of Commons on 17 March 1902 and passed as amendments to the Manitoba Grain Act with little modification on 19 May 1902. The act was also amended to require the CPR to cover the cost of land and sidings when anyone within forty miles of a siding applied to build a flat warehouse, and to build a loading platform when ten farmers formally applied for one. However, the act did not ensure enforcement. During the bumper harvest of 1902 there was again a shortage of cars, and CPR was clearly favoring the elevator companies in allocating the available cars. Motherwell and Peter Dayman went to Winnipeg to complain to CPR, where they were told that the railway was having difficulty adapting to the rapid growth in wheat production.

In the fall of 1902 the TGGA took CPR to court for violating the act's requirements for distributing cars, and won the case, which was confirmed by the supreme court. The Manitoba Grain Growers' Association (MGGA) was formed at a meeting on March 3–4, 1903 in Brandon, Manitoba. In 1903 two officers of the MGGA accompanied Motherwell and J.B. Gillespie of the TGGA to Ottawa where they met with representatives of the railways and grain companies to tighten up the wording of the Manitoba Grain Act. The new text was introduced as an amendment to the act which was passed that year. With the passage of the amendments to the act the TGGA had achieved its primary objective, and lost some of its momentum.

The farmers still felt that their livelihood was in the control of the grain companies, railways and manufacturers in the east. There were many stories of price fixing. In 1906 the farmers created the collectively owned Grain Growers' Grain Company, which had a seat on the Winnipeg Grain Exchange, to sell their crop on the open market and pay dividends. At first the company had no elevators, so it still had to make arrangements for storage with the elevator companies. Eventually the act of 1900 and additional regulations were consolidated in the Canada Grain Act of 1912. This legislation was profoundly influenced by farmers' leaders such as Edward Alexander Partridge of Sintaluta and William Richard Motherwell of Abernathy.

== Sources ==
- Dick, Lyle (2008). Farmers "making Good": The Development of Abernethy District, Saskatchewan, 1880-1920. University of Calgary Press. ISBN 978-1-55238-241-7.
- Friesen, Ron (2012-04-07). "Fair treatment for Western farmers began 100 years ago". Manitoba Co-operator.
- Goldsborough, Gordon (2013-08-08). "United Farmers of Manitoba [Manitoba Grain Growers Association]". Manitoba Historical Society.
- Klippenstein, Frieda Esau (2014). "MOTHERWELL, WILLIAM RICHARD (1860– 1943)". Encyclopedia of Saskatchewan. Archived from the original on 2008-02-21.
- Knuttila, Murray (2011). "Grain Growers Associations". Encyclopedia of the Great Plains. University of Nebraska–Lincoln.
- Manitoba Agricultural Museum Release (2014-04-22). "Farmers of yesteryear protected western wheat quality". Manitoba Co-operator.
- Nicholson, Karen (Spring–Summer 2003). "Small Farmers, Big Business, and the Battle over the "Prairie Sentinels"". Manitoba History (45).
- USDA (1928). Technical Bulletin. U.S. Department of Agriculture.
