= Grain Growers' Grain Company =

Early 20th century agricultural cooperative in Canada

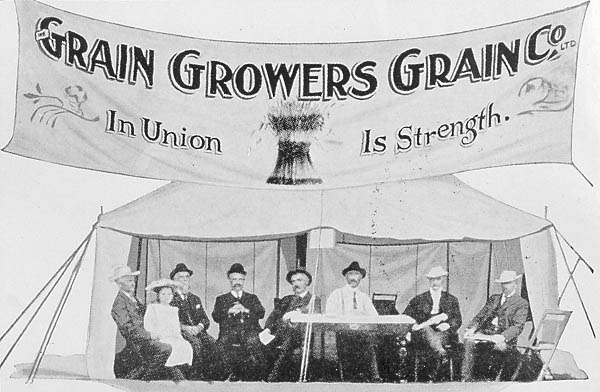
- Type: Farmers' cooperative
- Industry: Grain
- Founded: 1906
- Founders: Edward Alexander Partridge
- Defunct: 1917
- Successors: United Grain Growers
- Headquarters: Canada
- Area served: Canadian prairie provinces

The Grain Growers' Grain Company (GGGC) was a farmers' cooperative founded in the prairie provinces of western Canada in 1906. The GGGC met strong resistance from existing grain dealers. It was forced off the Winnipeg Grain Exchange and almost failed. With help from the Manitoba government it regained its seat on the exchange, and soon had a profitable grain trading business. The company founded the Grain Growers' Guide, which became the most popular farmer's newspaper in the region. In 1912 the GGGC began operating inland and terminal grain elevators, and in 1913 moved into the farm supply business. The GGGC was financially secure and owned or operated almost 200 elevators as well as 122 coals sheds and 145 warehouses by the time it merged with the Alberta Farmers' Co-operative Elevator Company to form the United Grain Growers in 1917.

== Foundation ==
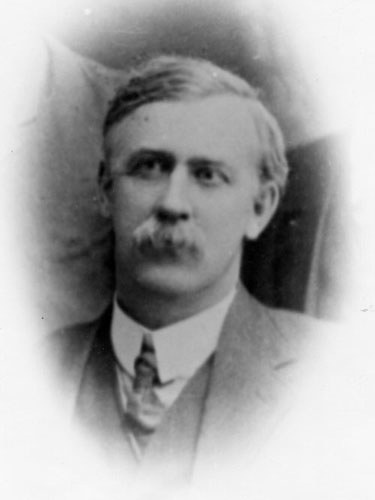
Edward Alexander Partridge, the driving force behind foundation of the GGGC

The GGGC was largely the creation of the agrarian activist Edward Alexander Partridge, an "impetuous and idealistic" man. He was called "the sage of Sintaluta". Partridge was sent by the Sintaluta, Saskatchewan local of the Territorial Grain Growers' Association (TGGA) to Winnipeg in January–February 1905 to observe the Winnipeg Grain Exchange. He was treated poorly and became convinced that the exchange was not interested in the farmers, who needed their own grain company. He called the Exchange the "House of the Closed Shutters." He described it as "a combine" with "a gambling hell thrown in."

Patridge spoke at the Saskatchewan Grain Growers' Association (SGGA) convention in 1906, and attacked the grain handling system. He said the elevator companies, millers and exporters rigged grain prices so they were low during the fall harvest period, when farmers had to sell to obtain cash to pay their debts. They then made future contracts to the English buyers for delivery at far higher prices. Many of his audience were convinced by his argument. The leaders of the SGGA were opposed to Partridge's plan to establish a farmer-owned company, but he ignored their objections. The organization meeting for the Grain Growers' Grain Company (GGGC) was held in Sintaluta on 27 January 1906.

At first it was an uphill battle to gain support. Less than a thousand shares had been sold by midsummer 1906. In June the Secretary of State at Ottawa refused to grant the company a Dominion charter on technical grounds. The GGGC was forced to apply for incorporation in Manitoba, which would handicap inter-provincial operations. The original charter was dated 20 July 1906. No farmer was allowed to own more than four of the $25 shares, and each farmer received just one vote at the meetings.

The provisional directors held their first meeting on 26 July 1906, where they elected Partridge president. The GGGC was officially launched on 5 September 1906. The company set up its headquarters in Winnipeg and purchased a seat on the Winnipeg Grain Exchange. The company did not have the $2,500 needed for the seat, so five of the founders had to sign personal notes to make up the amount. The first car of grain was received on 21 September 1906.

== Early years ==
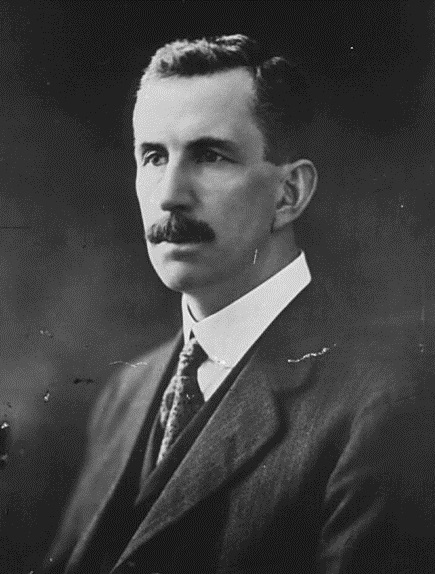
Thomas Crerar, President from 1907 to 1917

The GGGC immediately found itself engaged in a struggle with the existing grain companies. On 8 November 1906 it was expelled from the exchange due to its practice as a cooperative of paying patronage dividends to its member clients. In December 1906 Partridge and other officers were forced to pledge their personal assets to prevent the bank from closing the company's account. The first general meeting of shareholders was held on 5 February 1907. The company was reorganized along lines that were no longer explicitly cooperative.

The GGGC was reinstated on the exchange when the Manitoba Grain Growers' Association (MGGA) exerted pressure on the government of Rodmond Roblin. Trading privileges were restored on 15 April 1907. The president of the MGGA, D.W. McCuaig, sued three of the exchange's members for combining to obstruct trade. The farmers saw the reinstatement of the GGGC and a forced reorganization of the exchange as a vindication of their criticisms of the trading companies. However, the GGGC quickly adapted to following the same practices that the farmers had attacked.

The first annual meeting of the GGGC was held on 16 July 1907. Partridge resigned as president at this meeting, in part because the company's original cooperative structure had been modified to meet the requirements of the Grain Exchange, in part because he was not interested in running the company he had launched. Partridge was succeeded by Thomas Crerar of Manitoba, who was president and general manager until 1917.

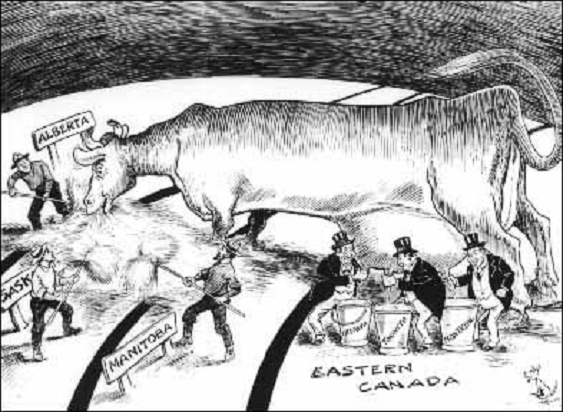
Cartoon from the Grain Growers Guide (15 December 1915). Farmers in the west are feeding the Milch Cow, while capitalists in the east are milking it.

Partridge felt that the press had given unfair treatment of the struggle to get the GGGC off the ground, and helped organize a farmers' publication. The Grain Growers' Guide first appeared in June 1908, edited by Partridge. It was published by the Grain Growers' Grain Company through its subsidiary, Public Press Limited. The Guide represented the interests of the three provincial grain growers' associations, the MGGA, SGGA and United Farmers of Alberta (UFA). This created a sense of solidarity and unity of purpose among the prairie farmers. The GGGC gave subsidies of CAN$25,000 to programs ran by the provincial growers' associations between 1909 and 1914, and provided CAN$60,000 for education in the same period.

== Expansion ==
On 19 May 1911 the GGGC received a Dominion charter. The company grew fast, from 1,800 shareholders in 1907 to more than 27,000 in 1912. The volume of grain handled by the company increased in that period from 2.3 million to almost 28 million bushels. At first the GGGC made arrangements with the elevator companies to handle the grain, which it sold on a commission basis on the exchange and returned profits to the investors. The GGGC made no effort to sell direct to foreign buyers, and was criticized by Partridge and others for its cautious approach. The growers' associations often asserted that the GGGC officials were inefficient and lacked judgement.

In 1912 Partridge organized a group that wrote an open letter to the grain growers in which they accused Crerar of "lack of industry and business ability," and of failure "in carrying out the wishes of the directors." Partridge was concerned about a speculative purchase that one of the executives had made and felt that Crerar, the president of the GGGC, should be forced to leave. Instead Partridge left the GGGC and tried to launch another grain company, but was not successful. The GGGC provided a pension to Partridge from 1916.

Although the company operated in all three prairie provinces, it was mainly concentrated in Manitoba. The Saskatchewan Co-operative Elevator Company was founded in 1911 to provide elevator services for local farmers, and later expanded into selling grain. In July 1912 the GGGC also entered the elevator business when it leased 174 country grain elevators from the government of Manitoba, and began to operate 135 of them. The GGGC started to build new country elevators. The GGGC leased two terminal elevators from the Canadian Pacific Railway at Fort William, Ontario, on Lake Superior. They started to operate the terminals in October 1912 as one unit with a capacity of 2,300,000 imperial bushels. In 1913 the company bought another terminal in Fort William. It burned down in 1916 and was replaced by a terminal in Port Arthur with a capacity of 300,000 imperial bushels.

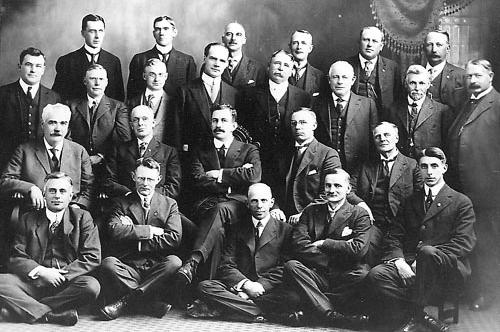
Directors of what would become the United Grain Growers in 1916

In May 1913 the GGGC leased a flour mill in Rapid City, Manitoba and entered the farm supply business, selling other products such as coal and apples. After a slow start the business began to flourish as vendors of supplies came to realize the value of the farmer-owned outlets. The GGGC opened a livestock branch in March 1916.

== Merger ==
In 1917 the GGGC merged with the Alberta Farmers' Co-operative Elevator Company (AFCEC) to form the United Grain Growers (UGG). The AFCEC had been established in 1913 and at once began construction. At the time of the merger it owned 103 elevators, 122 coals sheds and 145 warehouses. The GGGC owned 60 elevators in Manitoba and Saskatchewan, leased and operated 137 elevators owned by the Manitoba Government, and had 55 coal sheds and 78 warehouses for flour and farm supplies. It also owned the Grain Growers' Guide. The Saskatchewan Co-operative Elevator Company was involved in the merger discussions, but in the end decided not to join the UGG. Crerar continued as president of the UGG.

== Sources ==
- "Archives of United Grain Growers". Archives of the Agricultural Experience. University of Manitoba. Archived from the original on 2016-01-26.
- Dale-Burnett, Lisa Lynne (2006). Saskatchewan Agriculture: Lives Past and Present. University of Regina Press. ISBN 978-0-88977-169-7.
- Dick, Lyle (2008). Farmers "making Good": The Development of Abernethy District, Saskatchewan, 1880-1920. University of Calgary Press. ISBN 978-1-55238-241-7.
- Dodwell, Henry (1929). The Cambridge history of the British Empire. CUP Archive. GGKEY:RPCX9953HTH.
- Fairbairn, Brett (2014). "UNITED GRAIN GROWERS (AGRICORE UNITED)". Encyclopedia of Saskatchewan=. Archived from the original on 2014-08-17.
- Fairbairn, Brett (2014b). "GRAIN GROWERS' GRAIN COMPANY". Encyclopedia of Saskatchewan. Archived from the original on 2017-10-16.
- Freeman, Barbara M. (2011-12-14). Beyond Bylines: Media Workers and Women's Rights in Canada. Wilfrid Laurier Univ. Press. ISBN 978-1-55458-313-3.
- Friesen, Gerald (1987-01-01). The Canadian Prairies: A History. University of Toronto Press. ISBN 978-0-8020-6648-0.
- Goldsborough, Gordon (2013-08-08). "United Farmers of Manitoba [Manitoba Grain Growers Association]". Manitoba Historical Society.
- Knuttila, Kenneth Murray (1994). That Man Partridge: E.A. Partidge, His Thoughts and Times. University of Regina Press. p. 14. ISBN 978-0-88977-079-9.
- Knuttila, K. Murray (2014). "PARTRIDGE, EDWARD ALEXANDER". Dictionary of Canadian Biography.
- Lipset, Seymour Martin (1971-01-01). Agrarian Socialism: The Cooperative Commonwealth Federation in Saskatchewan : a Study in Political Sociology. University of California Press. ISBN 978-0-520-02056-6.
- Marchildon, Gregory P. (2011). Agricultural History. University of Regina Press. ISBN 978-0-88977-237-3.
- Porter, Jene M. (2008-01-01). Perspectives of Saskatchewan. Univ. of Manitoba Press. ISBN 978-0-88755-353-0.
- Sharp, Paul Frederick (1997). The Agrarian Revolt in Western Canada: A Survey Showing American Parallels. University of Regina Press. p. 22. ISBN 978-0-88977-106-2.
- Sherman, Patricia (2014). "Manitoba Grain Act".
