= Sintaluta =

Town in Saskatchewan, Canada

Sintaluta, Saskatchewan
- Town
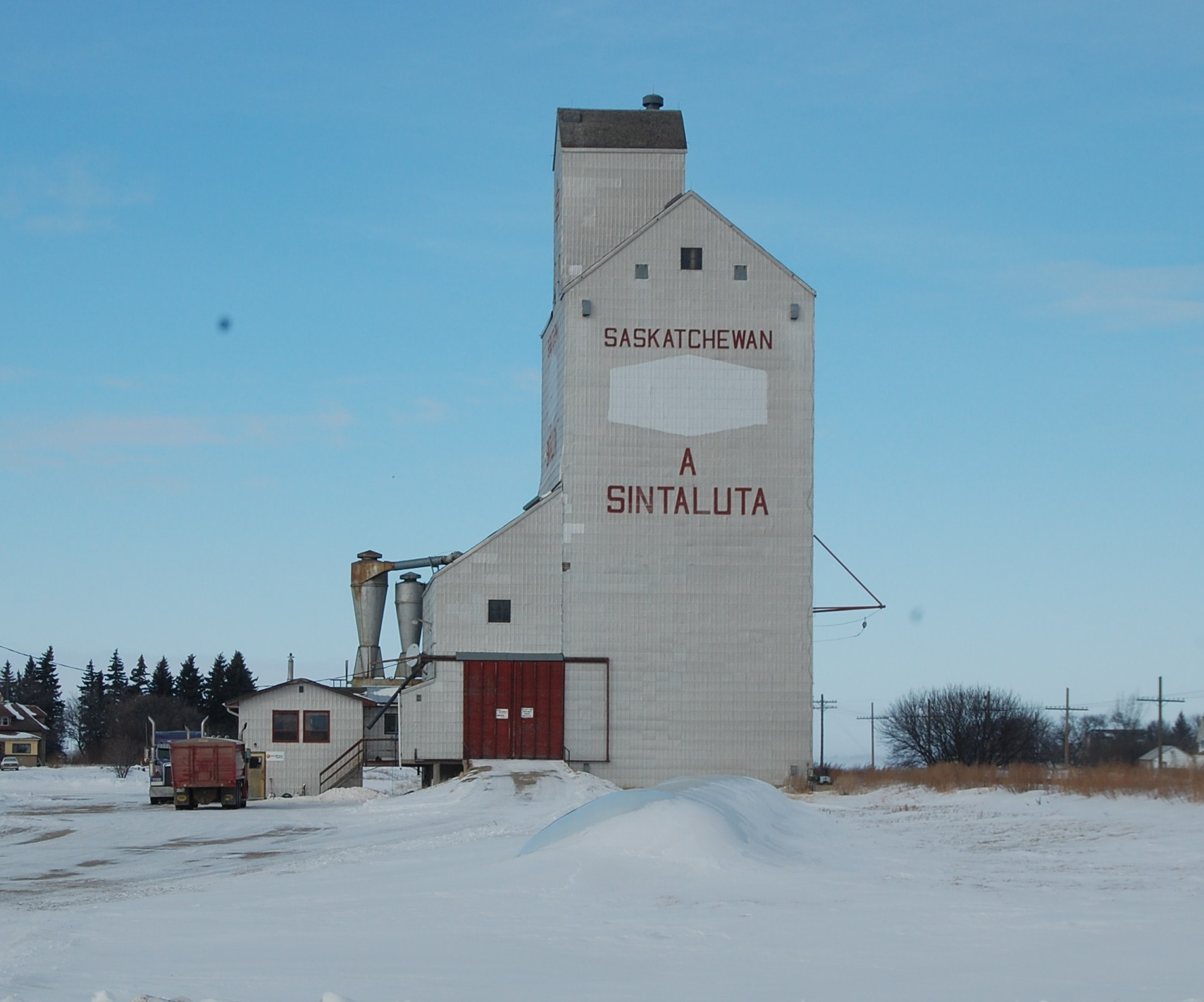
- Grain elevator

- Location within Saskatchewan Location within Canada
- Coordinates: 50.478°N 103.450°W
- Country: Canada
- Province: Saskatchewan
- Census division: 6
- Rural Municipality: Indian Head
- Established: 1881
- Incorporated (Village): 1881
- Incorporated (Town): 1907

Government
  - Mayor: Keith Rathgeber
  - Administrator: Christine Madeley
  - Governing body: Sintaluta Town Council

Area
  - Total: 2.70 km^{2} (1.04 sq mi)

Population (2016)
  - Total: 119
  - Density: 44.1/km^{2} (114/sq mi)
- Time zone: CST
- Postal code: S0G 4N0
- Area code: 306
- Highways: Highway 1 (TCH) / Highway 606
- Historic Sites: Saskatchewan House
- Website: www.sintaluta.ca

Sintaluta (/ˌsɪntəˈljuːtə/) is a town in Saskatchewan, Canada. The population of Sintaluta is 124 people according to the 2021 Census of Population. The town is about 85 km east of Regina. The town is on the north side of the Trans-Canada Highway. The name Sintaluta comes from the Lakota phrase siŋté lúta, meaning 'red tail', referring to the tail of the red fox.

It is the administrative headquarters of the Carry the Kettle Nakoda Nation band government.

== History ==
The first section foreman for the Canadian Pacific Railway (CPR) came to Sintaluta in 1886. The first railway station opened here in 1898. When Saskatchewan became a province in 1905, the people of the settlement soon set into action the application that this place should be incorporated into a town. This happened in 1907.

Before the Canadian Pacific Railway (CPR) made its way across the west, the pioneers would stop at Sintaluta to refresh their supplies before heading west. In 1881, the first stopping house was established at what would become Sintaluta. Sintaluta's first school classroom was opened up shortly after 1882. Church services were held in the stopping house and schools until 1887, when the Presbyterians built a wooden structure, followed by a brick one built by the Methodists in 1899. St. John the Baptist Anglican Church also built a stone church and manse that still stands today and has been carefully preserved by the local history club. In 1943, St Helene's Roman Catholic church was built. This church is still present today. In 1959, the congregation of Jehovah's Witnesses built Kingdom Hall. The United Church of Canada built a modern church and education centre in the early 1960s. This is now home to the senior citizens association.

The town outgrew its school classroom and the first school house was a necessity and was built in 1895. In 1899, a large stone school was built. It burned down in 1905. A two-story brick school was built in 1907. The bricks were purchased locally from a factory in Lebret.

In 1901, there was a bumper crop of wheat in the Sintaluta district. It was a good year all around for farmers as far as wheat was concerned, but their problem was getting the wheat on trains for delivery to the grain terminals. Farmers would bring their grain to the elevator and trains would leave without taking it. Some influential men of the time decided that they would take the Canadian Pacific Railway to court over this matter. One of these men was Edward Alexander Partridge. The farmers won the case. They had made their stand at a key time, for the CPR described Sintaluta as being the largest grain shipping point at that time, in Western Canada. This was later made into a movie by the Saskatchewan Wheat Pool and called The Long Haul.

Sintaluta was home to the founder of the current-day United Grain Growers Association (Agricore United) with prominent local residents residing on the first board of directors. The Grain Growers Guide (now The Country Guide) first editor was also from Sintaluta.

In 1945, Bell Telephone celebrated its 70th anniversary. There was a resident in town, whose name was John Miller. He was 91 years old at the time. He received a call from Paris, Ontario, that was sent by the mayor of the city. It was congratulating him on being the oldest person from Western Canada who heard the first message sent over the Bell Telephone when he was 21 years old.

Sintaluta once was home to seven elevator companies, and has the distinction as being one of the top grain-producing areas in all of Canada. There are two remaining elevators in town today, and are in the hands of private owners, two of fewer than 350 elevators that remain across the prairies today.

Robert (Bob) Baker worked for the Saskatchewan Wheat Pool as a grain buyer from 1935 until 1952 when he was superannuated from the Sask. Wheat Pool elevator and became Town Clerk as well as selling farm insurance. The Sintaluta Co-op service station opened in 1947. Vic Sexsmith was the Manager from 1947 to 1965. Albert Sexsmith worked there from 1947 to 1954. It is the only service station still in operation in Sintaluta in 2017. Vic Sexsmith became Town Clerk in 1965 taking over from Robert Baker who was Town Clerk from 1952 to 1965. Vic also took over the insurance business. Vic Sexsmith was a Town Councillor for several terms. He became the Mayor of Sintaluta in 1961. He remained as Town Clerk from 1965 until 1970 when he became ill and his wife Marion Sexsmith took over and was Town Clerk until 1974.

== Demographics ==
In the 2021 Census conducted by Statistics Canada, Sintaluta had a population of 124 living in 55 of its 72 total private dwellings, a change of 4.2% from its population of 119 recorded in the 2016 Canadian Census. With a land area of 2.67 km^{2} (1.03 sq mi), it had a population density of 46.4/km^{2} (120.3/sq mi) in 2021.

== See also ==
- List of towns in Saskatchewan
- List of place names in Canada of Indigenous origin
