= American Society of Equity =

American agricultural cooperative (1902–1934)

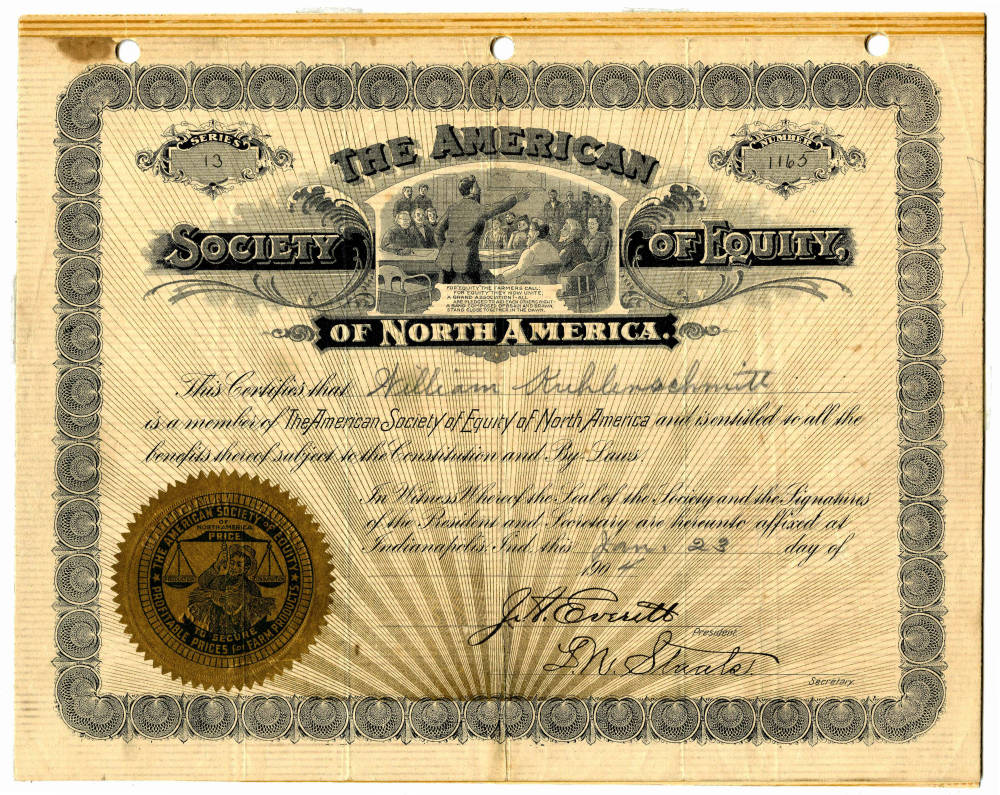
American Society of Equity membership certificate

The American Society of Equity or Farmers Equity was an American agricultural cooperative and political organization, founded in 1902, which aimed to organize farmers as a "Third Power" in the United States, able to compete with capital and organized labor on equal terms. Equity inspired the creation of many farmers' cooperatives still in existence. Equity forces became involved in the politics of Wisconsin, Minnesota, and North Dakota, leading in the latter state to the eventual rise of the Nonpartisan League. Leaders of Equity (such as U.S. Senator Magnus Johnson and Wisconsin State Senator Henry Kleist) were elected to numerous local political offices.

== History ==
This society was organized by James A. Everitt at Indianapolis, Indiana, in 1902, to see to it that justice was done to the farmer and the consumer. Its principal aim was to "assist the farmer financially, socially, politically, and industrially." To this end, it demanded equitable prices for all farm products, equal rights for the farmers with their urban fellow-citizens, adequate influence in legislation, and such returns in the pursuit of agriculture as were reaped in industrial pursuits. Equitable prices were to be determined by the cost of production, plus a fair and reasonable profit. The cost of production included: interest on capital invested, taxes on real estate and personal property, labor, seed, insurance, wear and tear, transportation to markets and other items of expense incident to the management of a farm. These equitable prices were to be obtained by co-operative control of the markets by the producers, by regulating deliveries and sales, and by preventing so-called dumping or glutting. Farm products were to be offered for sale as the demand warrants, or by pooling for direct sales (this system was adopted by tobacco growers). Socially, farmers and their families were to be brought into closer contact, in order to promote the community spirit. Meetings were held, entertainments were given, and picnics arranged. Women's auxiliaries assisted in this work. Politically, the farmers were taught to be more active and to take a greater interest in local, State, and national affairs. The Society was non-partisan and non-sectarian. Political and religious discussions were not tolerated at its meetings. By conducting the meetings in accordance with parliamentary rules, the members were to be educated and trained sufficiently to fill public offices efficiently, when elected to them, and to represent their constituents effectively. Industrially, the farmers were taught the importance of agriculture, the need of accounting, and the benefits to be derived from more modern methods. By increasing the farmers' remuneration or income, better homes were to be provided, to keep the children on the farm and to give them a start on farms of their own. The headquarters of the Society were at Indianapolis.

The Archbishops of the United States, at their meeting in 1914, decided that the Society of Equity was not a secret society forbidden to Catholics.

In 1934, the Society merged into the Farmers' Union.
