= United Grain Growers =

Canadian farmers cooperative

- Industry: Agriculture
- Predecessor: Grain Growers' Grain Company; Alberta Farmers' Co-operative Elevator Company
- Founded: 1917
- Defunct: 2001
- Fate: Merged with Agricore
- Successor: Agricore United
- Headquarters: Winnipeg, Manitoba
- Products: Grain buying

The United Grain Growers, or UGG, was a Canadian grain farmers' cooperative for grain storage and distribution that operated between 1917 and 2001.

== History ==
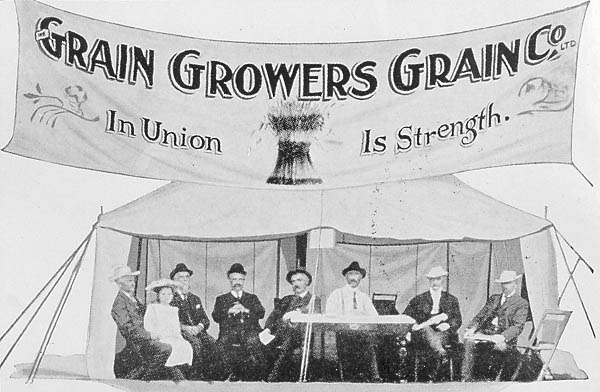
Tent for the Grain Growers. Grain Co., a cooperative farmers organization in Canada that was the precursor of the United Grain Growers, cica. 1910.

In 1917, the Grain Growers' Grain Company (GGGC) merged with the Alberta Farmers' Co-operative Elevator Company, founded in 1913, to form the United Grain Growers (UGG), which provided grain marketing, handling and supply. UGG was active in grain sales, crop inputs and livestock production services.

In 2001, UGG merged with Agricore to form Agricore United in a deal brokered by Archer Daniels Midland, a majority stakeholder in the new company.

== Gallery and locations ==
Alberta

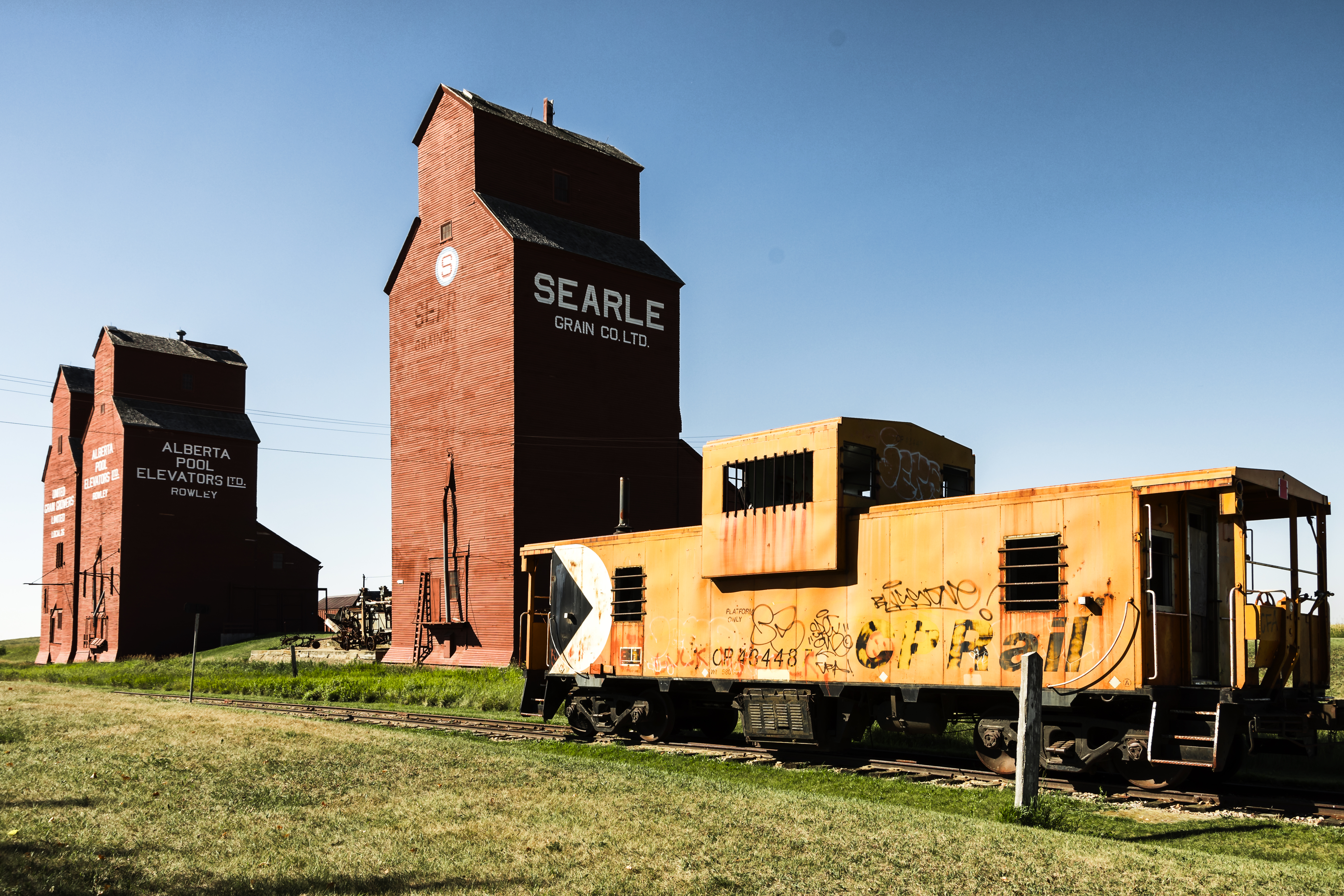
Rowley

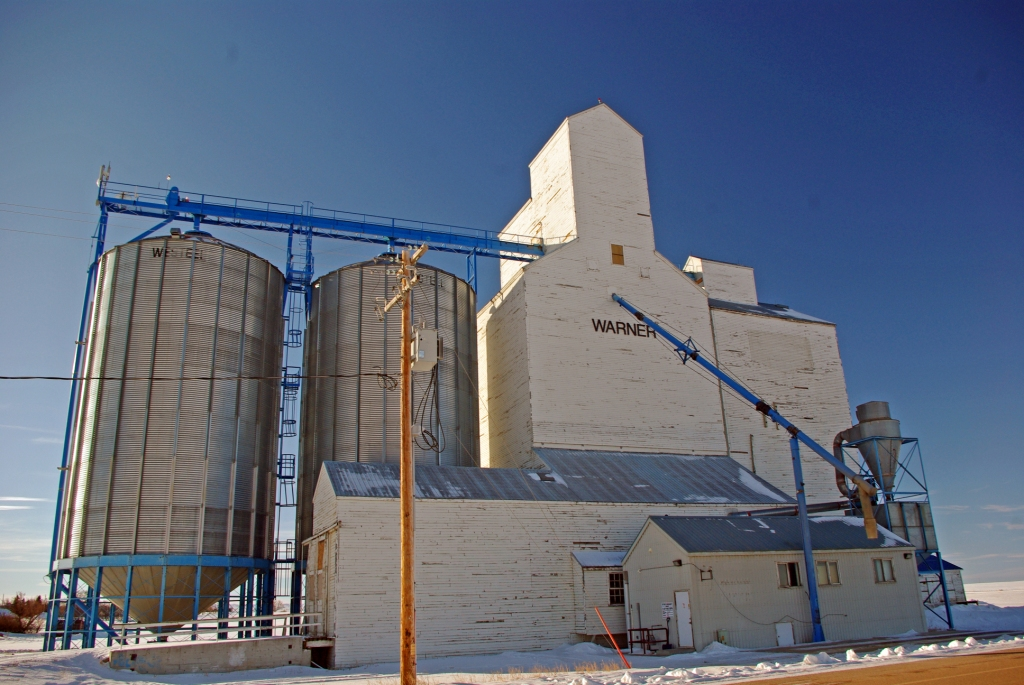
Warner

British Columbia

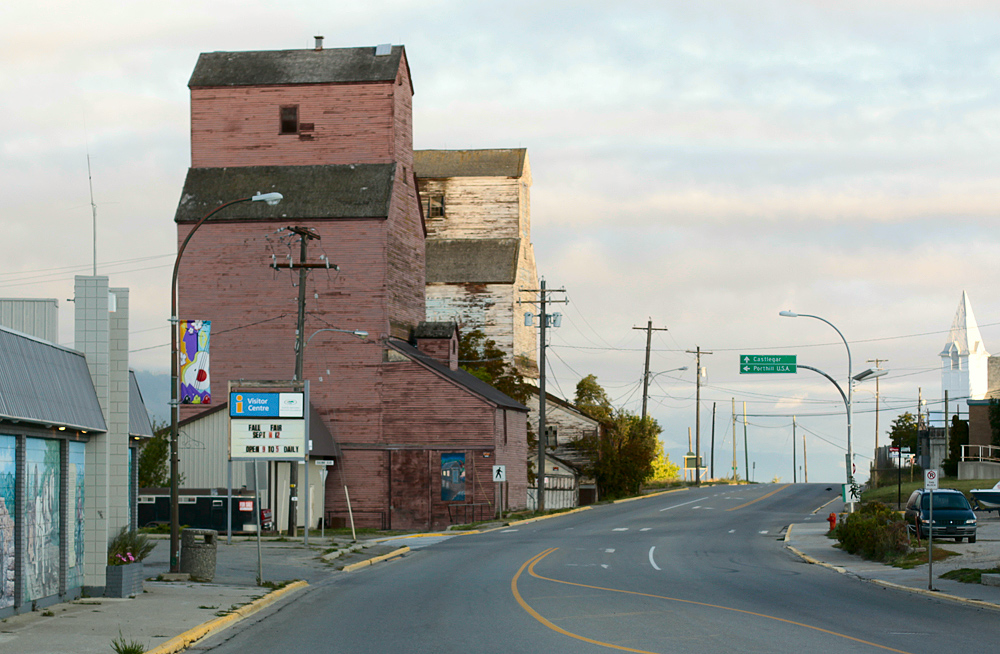
Creston

Manitoba

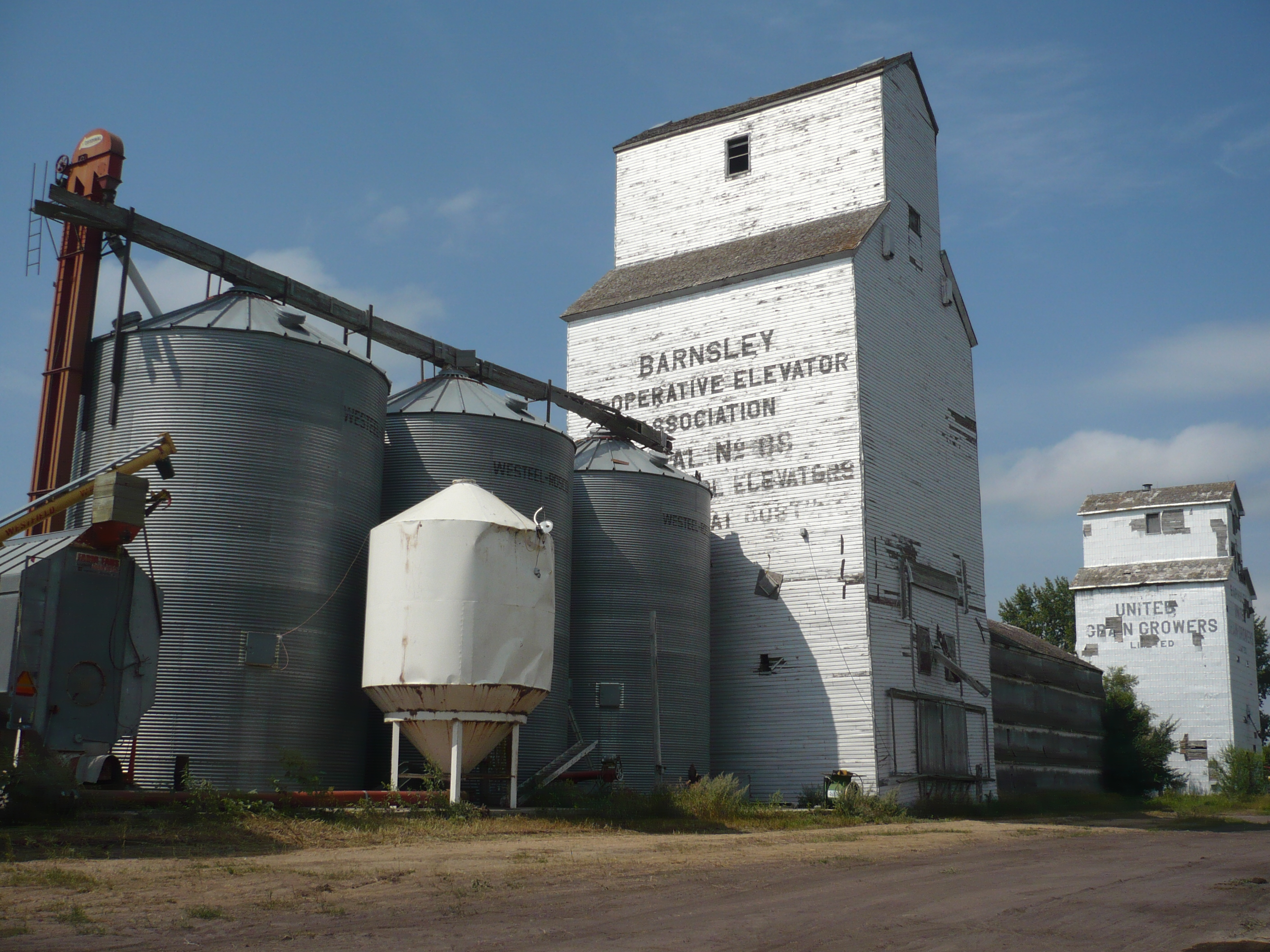
Barnsley

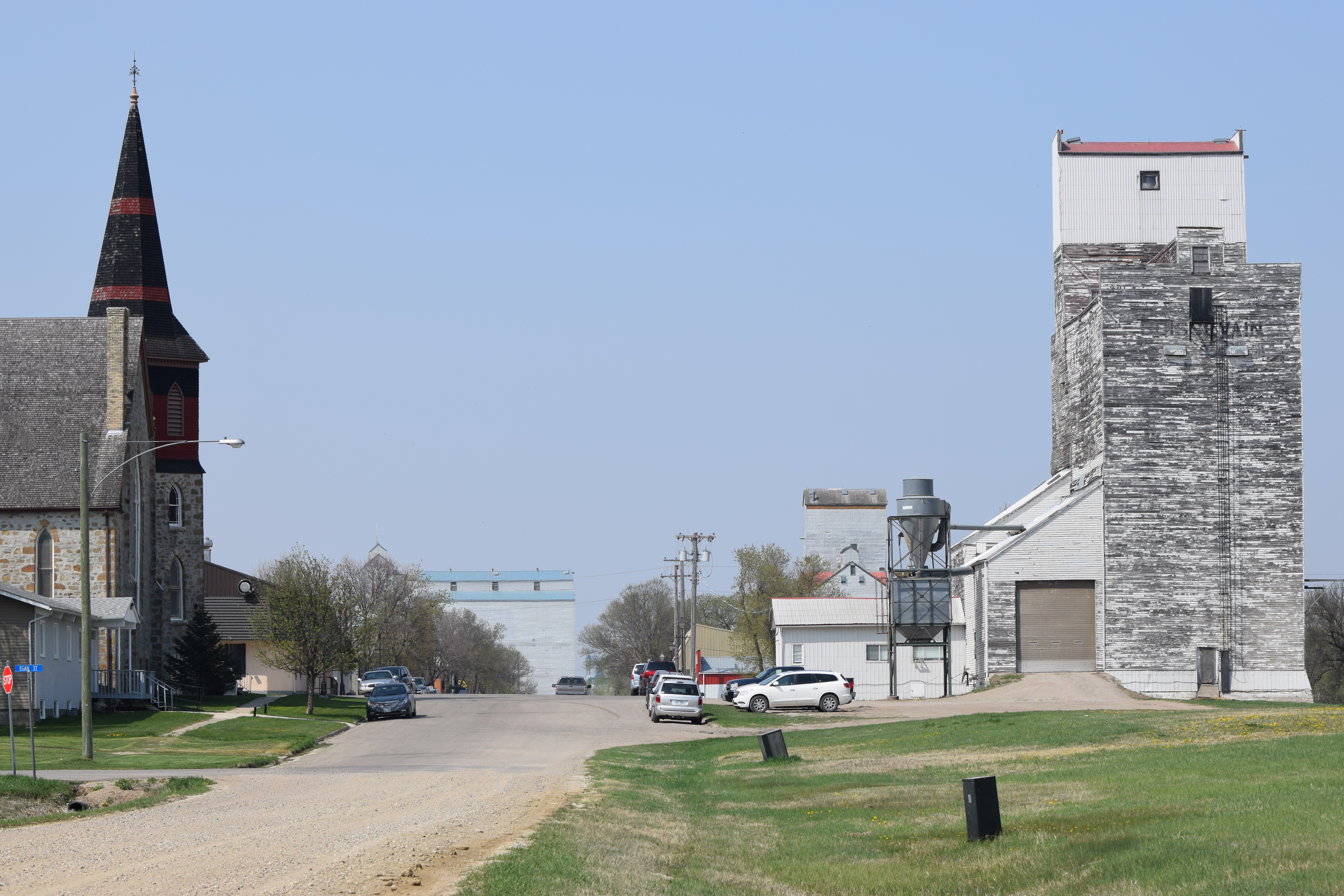
Boissevain

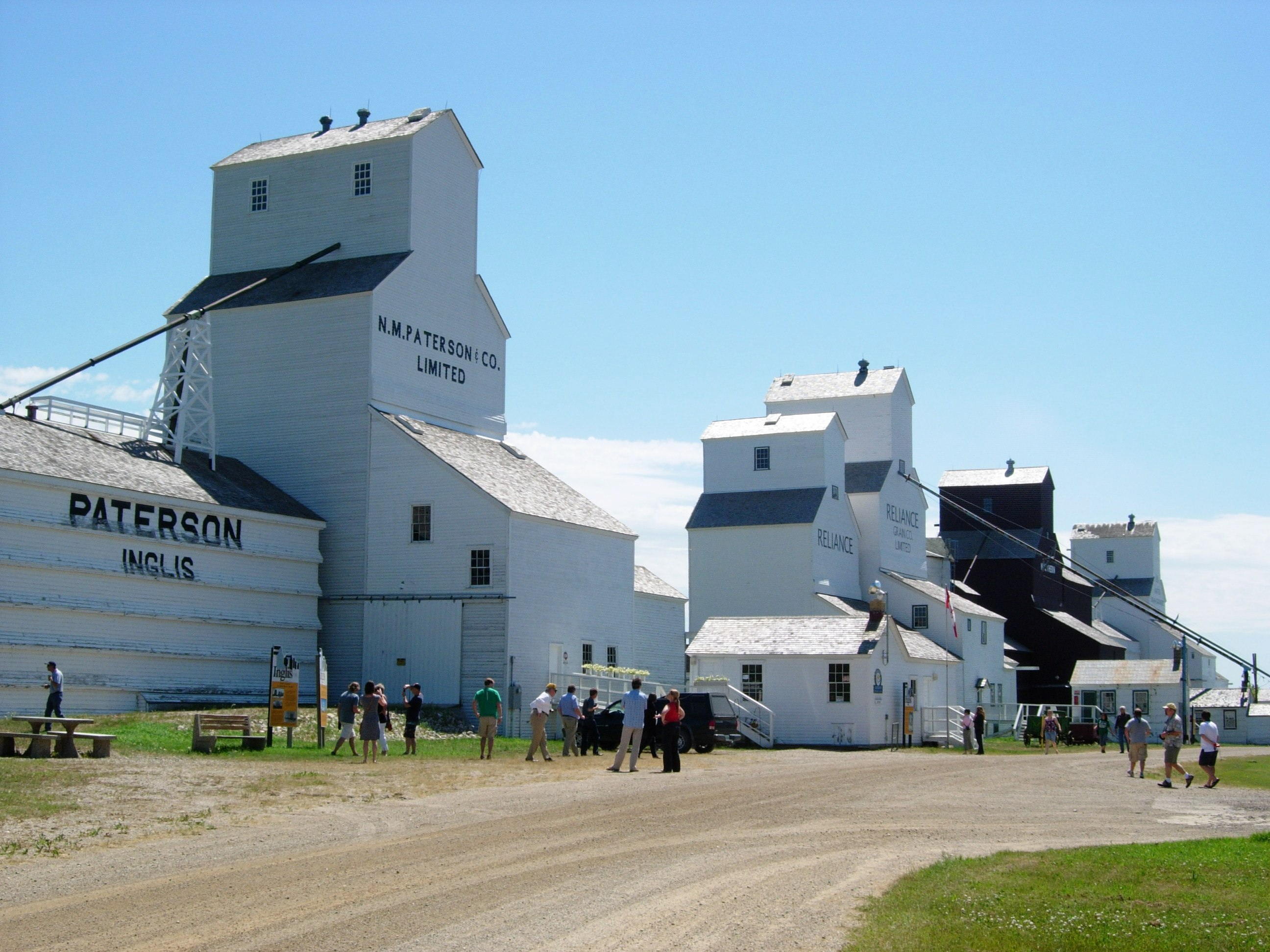
Inglis – Inglis Grain Elevators National Historic Site

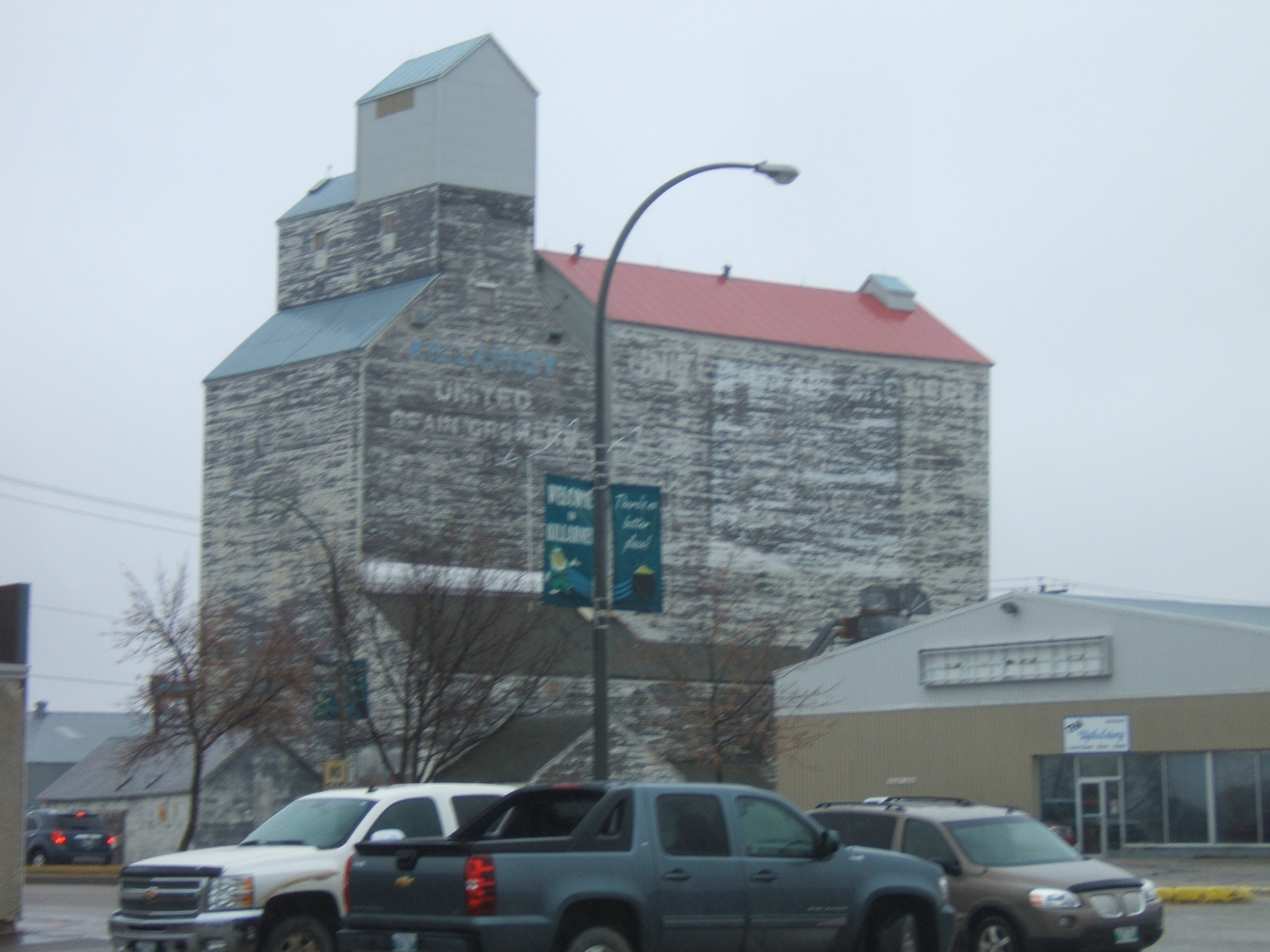
Killarney (Demolished 2017)

Saskatchewan

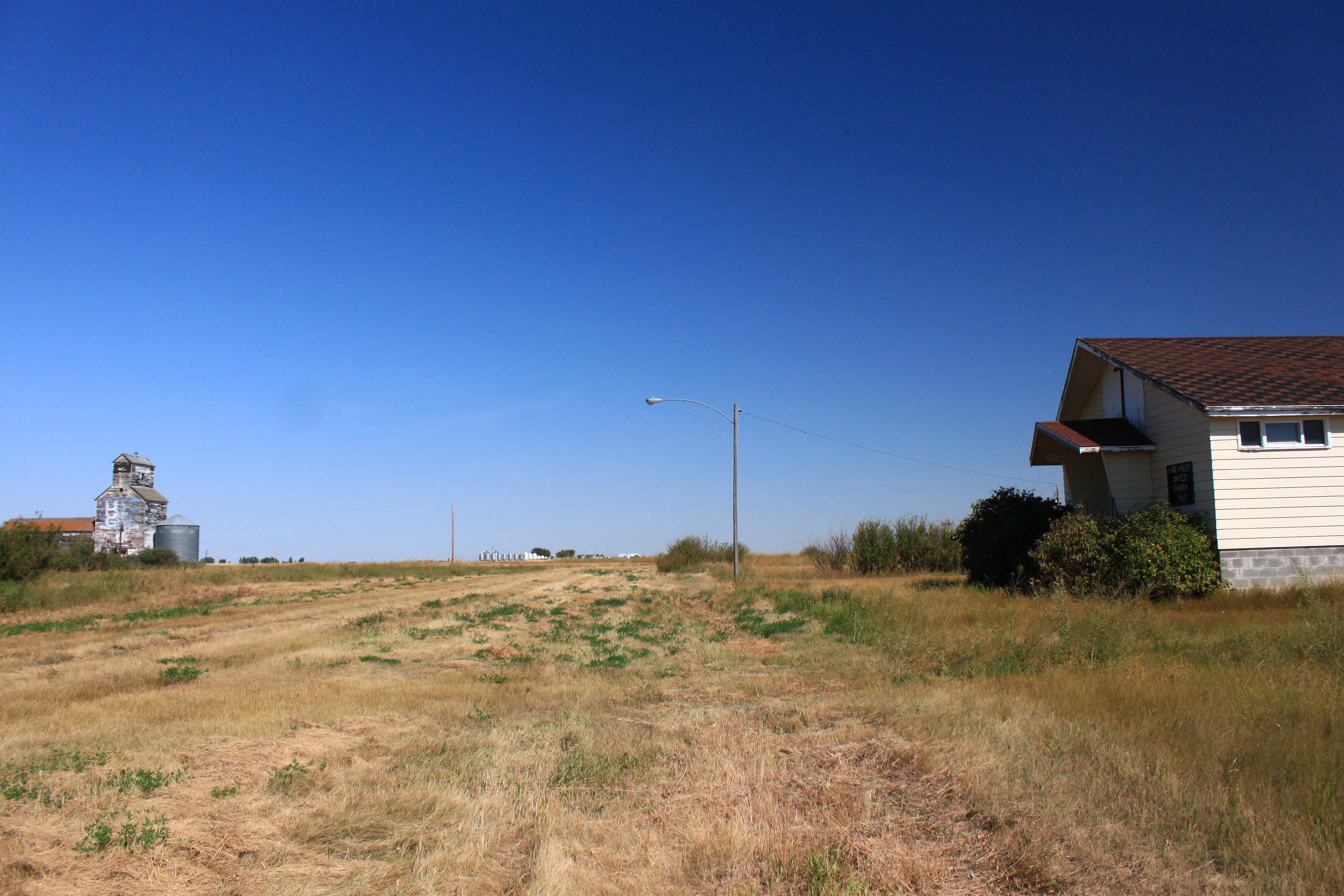
Lake Valley

== See also ==
- Francis Black
- James Galbraith
- John Edward Brownlee
- Wallace v. United Grain Growers Ltd.

== Sources ==
- Fairbairn, Brett (2014). "United Grain Growers (Agricore United)". Encyclopedia of Saskatchewan. Archived from the original on April 24, 2015.
