= William Richard Motherwell =

Canadian politician

The Hon. William Richard Motherwell
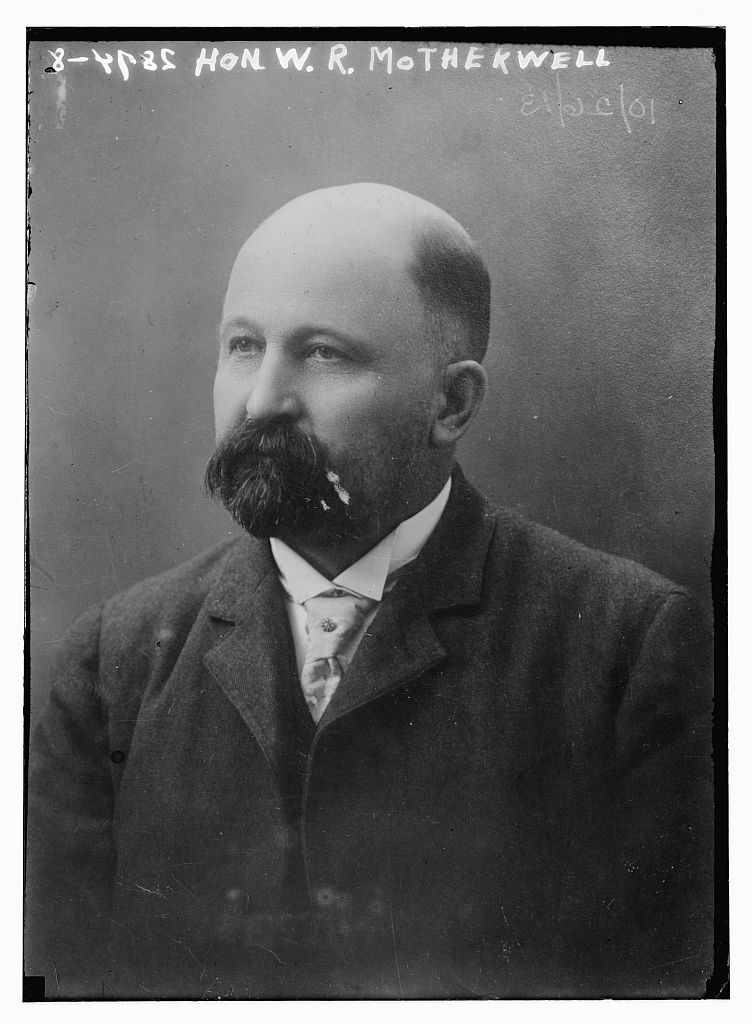

Member of the Canadian Parliament for Regina
- In office 1921–1925
- Preceded by: Walter Davy Cowan
- Succeeded by: Francis Nicholson Darke

Member of the Canadian Parliament for Melville
- In office 1925–1940
- Preceded by: District was created in 1924
- Succeeded by: James Garfield Gardiner

Member of the Legislative Assembly of Saskatchewan for Kindersley
- In office 1912–1919
- Succeeded by: Wesley Harper Harvey

Member of the Legislative Assembly of Saskatchewan for Humboldt
- In office 1908–1912
- Preceded by: David Bradley Neely
- Succeeded by: William Ferdinand Alphonse Turgeon

Member of the Legislative Assembly of Saskatchewan for North Qu'Appelle
- In office 1905–1908
- Succeeded by: John Archibald McDonald

Personal details
- Born: January 6, 1860 Perth, Canada West
- Died: May 24, 1943 (aged 83)
- Party: Liberal
- Cabinet: Federal: Minister of Agriculture (1921-1926, 1926-1930); Provincial: Provincial Secretary (1905-1912); Commissioner of Agriculture (1905-1909); Minister of Agriculture (1909-1919)

William Richard Motherwell, PC (January 6, 1860 – May 24, 1943) was a Canadian politician serving at both the Saskatchewan Legislative Assembly and the Canadian Parliament. He served as Agriculture Minister for both levels of government during his career.

== Biography ==
Born in Perth, Canada West, Motherwell attended the Ontario Agricultural College, graduating in 1881; then worked that summer in Portage la Prairie, Manitoba. The following year he spring he returned to the prairies joining settlers in who traveled by rail to Brandon, Manitoba, then by red river cart and wagon beyond to the area of Abernethy, Saskatchewan, where he settled and constructed the Motherwell Homestead. In 1901, he co-founded and became president of the Territorial Grain Growers' Association. He served in the provincial legislator from 1905 to 1918, Saskatchewan Minister of Agriculture from 1906-1917. His resignation from the provincial legislature was in protest over the provincial Liberal Party's support for conscription and reduction in French language rights.

He first ran as the Liberal candidate for the House of Commons of Canada for the Saskatchewan riding of Assiniboia in a 1919 by-election. Although defeated, he was elected in the riding of Regina in the 1921 federal election. He was re-elected in 1925, 1926, 1930, and 1935 for the riding of Melville. From 1921 to 1930, he was the Minister of Agriculture, except for a short period in 1926.

== Legacy ==
The Motherwell Homestead near Abernethy, Saskatchewan was designated a National Historic Site of Canada in 1966, and is now operated as a museum.

== Archives ==
There is a William Richard Motherwell and Catherine Motherwell fonds at Library and Archives Canada.
