= Health Sciences Association of Alberta =

Canadian trade union

- Logo since 2006
- Founded: 1971
- Headquarters: Edmonton, Alberta, Canada
- Location: Canada
- Members: 29,800 as of October 2022
- Key people: Mike Parker, President; George C. Hall, co-founding father, first executive director
- Affiliations: National Union of Public and General Employees
- Website: hsaa.ca

Health Sciences Association of Alberta (HSAA) is a trade union in Alberta, Canada, which represents approximately 29,800 members.

== Background ==
In 1971, eleven "paramedical technical and professional members" established the HSAA to have a stronger representation than that provided by the larger existing labour unions.

HSAA membership include employees in Alberta's public and private health-care sectors, such as "paramedics, lab technologists, psychologists, pharmacists, and respiratory therapists."

The United Conservative Party (UCP) government under Premier Jason Kenney and Alberta Health Services, notified Health Sciences Association of Alberta, United Nurses of Alberta, and the Alberta Union of Provincial Employees of the government's intentions to cut an "estimated 6,400 to 7,400 unionized public-sector jobs by 2023".

In February 2020, the consulting firm Ernst and Young, submitted their commissioned report to Premier Kenney, in which they recommended "contracting out surgeries, hospital food service, housekeeping, laundry, security, laboratory testing". The HSAA warned that "contracting out surgeries, hospital food service, housekeeping, laundry, security, laboratory testing and more will lead to bigger hits to government coffers down the road." (Note: Among the 57 recommendations in the report, options included "selling some long-term care homes and leasing space to private pharmacies in health facilities.") The HSAA said that "privatizing lab services in Alberta could affect 850 full-time positions".

== Bargaining rights and labour negotiations ==
The Public Sector Wage Arbitration Deferral Act (Bill 9) which became law on June 20, 2019, suspended and delayed hearings related to wage arbitration for Alberta's 180,000 public service workers represented by unions in 24 collective agreements, which included the HSAA, until August, when Janice MacKinnon's "Report and Recommendations: Blue Ribbon Panel on Alberta's Finances" was submitted.

In February 2020, an independent public-sector wage arbitrator decided for the Provincial government and against the HSAA with a "zero per cent wage increase" to HSAA workers. In his February 6 statement, Alberta Finance Minister Travis Toews said that the UCP provincial government prioritizes "service delivery over salary increases for public sector workers".

== See also ==
- United Nurses of Alberta
- Alberta Union of Provincial Employees
- Canadian Union of Public Employees
- Alberta Teachers' Association
- Alberta Federation of Labour
- Canadian Union of Public Employees
