= Public Sector Wage Arbitration Deferral Act =

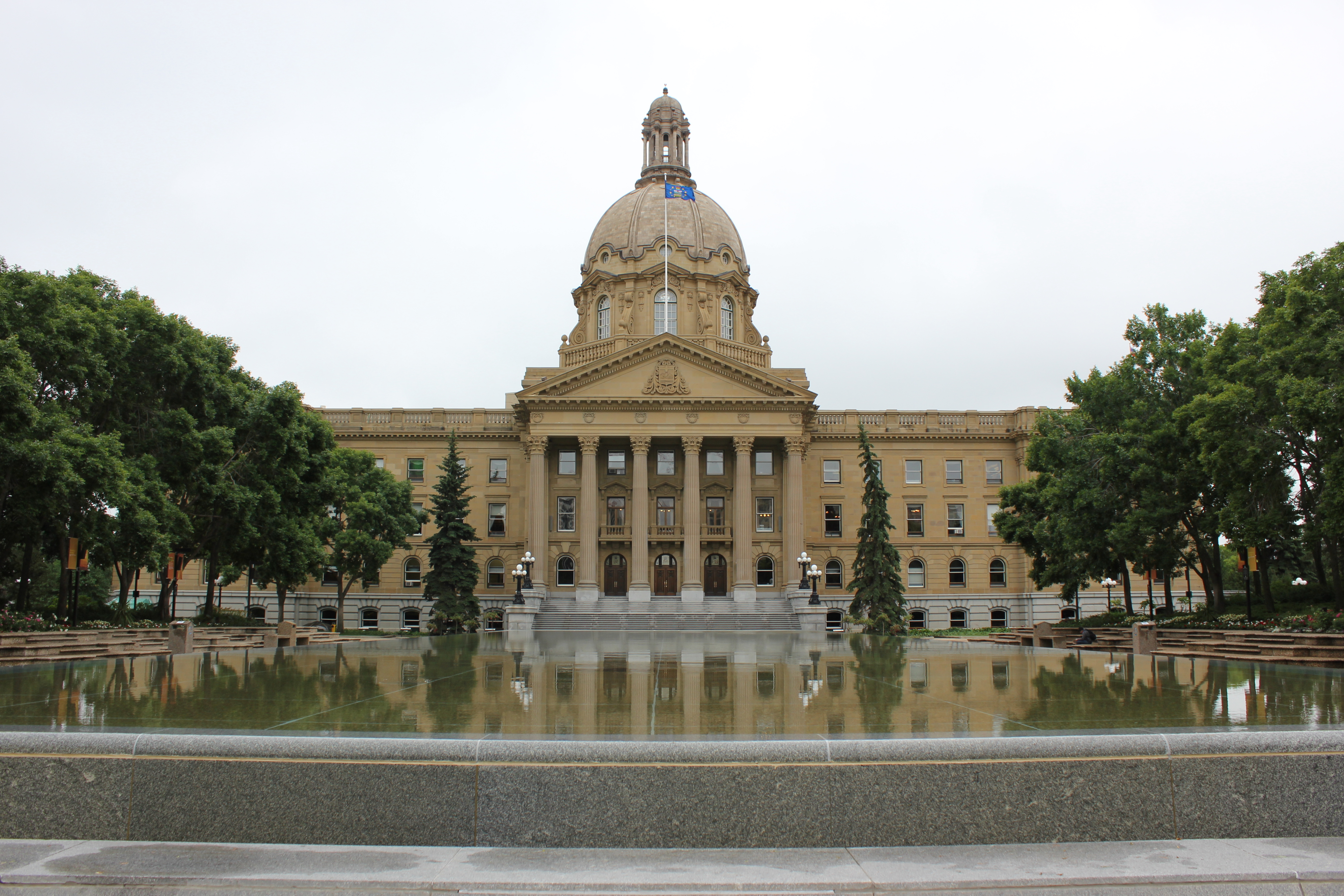

Legislative Assembly of Alberta
- Enacted by: Legislative Assembly of Alberta

Legislative history
- Introduced by: Travis Toews, Minister of Finance
- First reading: June 13, 2019
- Second reading: June 17–18, 2019
- Third reading: June 19–20, 2019

The Public Sector Wage Arbitration Deferral Act (Bill 9) is a bill, informally known as the "bargaining rights bill", introduced by the Province of Alberta's United Conservative Party (UCP) government under Premier Jason Kenney, during the 30th Alberta Legislature, constituted after the general election on April 16, 2019. Bill 9 was passed on June 20, 2019. According to Alberta Finance Minister Travis Toews, Bill 9 suspends and delays hearings related to wage arbitration for public sector workers until October 31, 2019 in order to allow time for the provincial government to study the August 2019 finance report of the MacKinnon panel. Bill 9 affects 180,000 public service employees in Alberta that are represented by unions in 24 collective agreements.

The Alberta government set a goal of balancing the budget by 2022–2023.

== History ==
Travis Toews, Minister of Finance and president of the Treasury Board, introduced Bill 9 on June 13, 2019 and its 1st reading was on the same day. Its 2nd reading was from June 17 to June 18. On June 18, Jason Nixon, who was named as Government house leader and Minister of Environment and Parks on April 30. (Note: According to The Star, Nixon announced in May 2019 (subscription required)that the new provincial government intended to "roll out 12 new pieces of legislation" between May and July 2019.) The 3rd reading was from June 19 to June 20. A closure of the third reading of the bill was forced by the provincial government in the early hours of June 20 and the bill was passed at 7:00 AM in the provincial legislature in Edmonton, Alberta.

During the all-night session of third reading, at 11:30 PM on June 19, Kenney began distributing "bright pink earplugs" to his caucus to muffle the speech of MLAs who opposed the bill as it stood, including Edmonton-North West NDP MLA David Eggen who "spoke in favour of an NDP amendment to the bill." Eggen said to the legislature, "I would beg an answer from the members opposite, although I can see that many of them are wearing bright pink earplugs that their premier is handing out to all of them right now. Probably many of them can't hear what I'm saying right now." In her June 20 written statement Christine Myatt, Kenney's press secretary, said that it "was a harmless and light-hearted attempt to boost government caucus morale after being forced to listen to the NDP's insults, lies and over-the-top rhetoric for hours on end."

== Government position ==
On May 7, 2019, Kenney announced the formation of the MacKinnon panel with Janice MacKinnon as chair, as an "independent, non-partisan group of experts to conduct a deep dive into Alberta’s fiscal situation" in fulfillment of an election promise. Kenney has promised to balance the budget by 2022-2023. MacKinnon was the Finance Minister in Saskatchewan under the NDP Premier Roy Romanow in the 1990s. The MacKinnon panel, which includes Dave Mowat, who was formerly president of ATB Financial, Mike Percy who was formerly a dean at the University of Alberta, Kim Henderson, Bev Dahlby, and Jay Ramotar, is tasked with providing the report by August 15 that will provide guidelines for the fall 2019 provincial budget. In order to study the results of the report, Bill 9 was intended to delay bargaining with public sector unions until October 31 to incorporate the report's findings. On May 7, MLA Deron Bilous said "there is no way Kenney's government can balance the budget by 2022 while cutting corporate taxes and without slashing public services."

== Opposition ==
According to the Edmonton Journal, "[u]nion leaders have called the bill an "egregious attack" on the collective bargaining rights of 180,000 Alberta workers, including government employees, nurses, teachers, health professionals and others."

Those who opposed the bill, including the official opposition, the Alberta New Democratic Party, led by former-Premier Rachel Notley, were concerned that it would result in public sector contracts not being honoured by the province. The bill affects the contracts of teachers, nurses, "social workers, hospital support staff, prison guards, conservation officers, toxicologists, restaurant inspectors, therapists and sheriffs" and other public service employees.

== Unions ==
By May 25, 2019, Phyllis Smith, Alberta Union of Provincial Employees (AUPE)'s independent arbitrator "ruled in favour of following the previously agreed upon terms of the collective agreement" and denied the UCP government's request to "delay wage-adjustment arbitration for tens of thousands of AUPE members". In 2018, AUPE members, Provincial Government Services, AHS General Support Services, and AHS Nursing Care, had "ratified collective agreements" which included "wage-adjustment arbitration to be held no later than June 30, 2019."

On May 13, Toews said that halting wage arbitration "for the final year of the current three-year contract" between the United Nurses of Alberta (UNA) and their employers—Alberta Health Services, Covenant Health, Lamont Health Care Centre and the Bethany Group—was "the responsible thing to do." Toews would not confirm if the UCP government would "seek wage rollbacks." According to a June 6 CBC report, the Alberta Labour Relations Board (ALRB) denied the United Nurses of Alberta (UNA)'s appeal to hear the UNA's application to reopen wage arbitration delayed by the UCP because the ALRB "lacks jurisdiction". The ALRB "directed the UNA to appeal to the courts".

== See also ==
- Public Service Salary Restraint Act
