= United Nurses of Alberta =

Trade union in Alberta, Canada

- Abbreviation: UNA
- Founded: May 6, 1977; 48 years ago
- Headquarters: Calgary and Edmonton
- Location: Canada
- Members: More than 30,000
- Key people: Heather Smith (President)
- Website: www.una.ca

The United Nurses of Alberta (UNA) is a trade union representing more than 30,000 Registered Nurses, Registered Psychiatric Nurses, and allied health workers in Alberta, Canada. UNA negotiates collective bargaining with the employers, of which the largest are Alberta Health Services and Covenant Health.

UNA advocates for public healthcare, safe staffing levels, occupational health and safety and membership participation. UNA has been a strong advocate for strengthening Alberta's public healthcare system and has advocated for the hiring of more professional nursing staff. UNA provides numerous educational and professional development opportunities for its members.

UNA was formed on May 6, 1977, when the Alberta Association of Registered Nurses (now the College and Association of Registered Nurses of Alberta) general membership voted to make its collective bargaining committee an independent organization. In 1997, UNA and the Staff Nurses' Association of Alberta amalgamated, forming one union for Registered Nurses in the province.

UNA members voted to affiliate with the Canadian Federation of Nurses Unions (CFNU) in 1998 and join the Alberta Federation of Labour in 2001.

== See also ==
- List of nursing organizations
- Nursing in Canada
- Alberta Union of Provincial Employees
- Alberta Federation of Labour
- Canadian Federation of Nurses Unions
- Health Sciences Association of Alberta
