= Marc Abrahams =

American mathematician and scientific editor

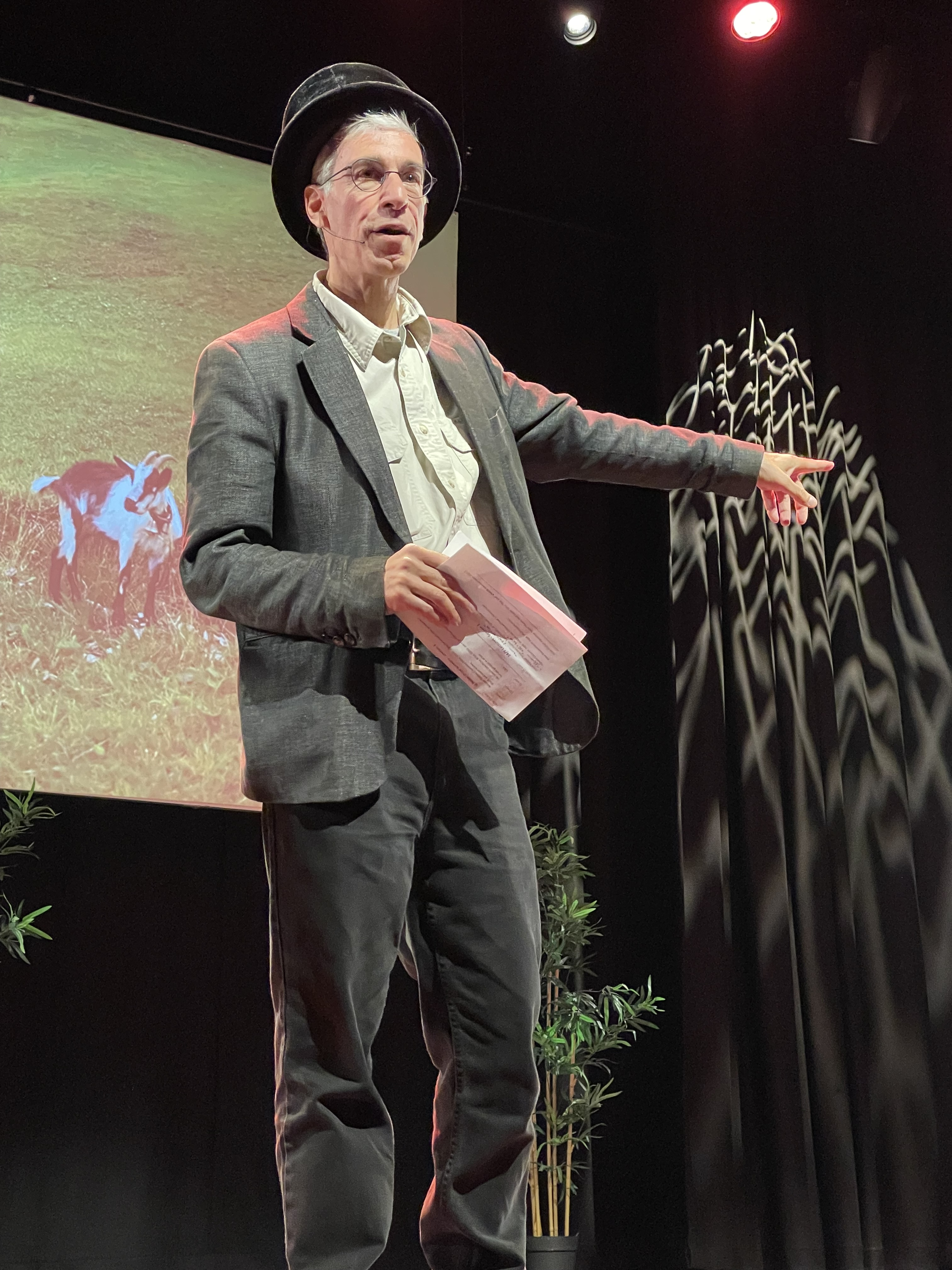
Marc Abrahams in 2026

Marc Abrahams (born 1956) is an American mathematician and scientific editor. He is the editor and co-founder of Annals of Improbable Research and the master of ceremonies at the annual Ig Nobel Prize celebration, which he founded in 1991. He was formerly editor of the Journal of Irreproducible Results.

Abrahams grew up in Swampscott, Massachusetts. He is married to Robin Abrahams, also known as "Miss Conduct", a columnist for the Boston Globe.

Abrahams graduated from Harvard College with a degree in applied mathematics. While working full time as a software engineer in 1990, he reached out to retired math columnist Martin Gardner asking him to recommend publications that might publish Abrahams' humor writing about math and science. Gardner replied with one defunct journal called the Journal of Irreproducible Results which Israeli scientists Alex Kohn and Harry Lipkin had founded in 1955 and abandoned after about ten years due to the workload. Abrahams restarted the journal and devoted his evenings to working on it, often getting help from the two founders. He was editor for four years, and he organized the first annual Ig Nobel Prize ceremony in 1991. Because the Journal of Irreproducible Results publisher did not provide funds or sufficient support, Abrahams left to create his own rival magazine called the Annals of Improbable Research, also known as AIR. By 2004, the magazine was in its tenth year and Abrahams published a daily blog, monthly email newsletter, and column in The Guardian in addition to books related to improbable research.

== Bibliography ==
Books written or edited by Abrahams include:

- This Is Improbable (ISBN 978-1-85168-931-6)
- The Ig Nobel Prizes (ISBN 978-0-525-94753-0)
- Why Chickens Prefer Beautiful Humans (ISBN 978-0-7528-6846-2)
- Sex As a Heap of Malfunctioning Rubble (ISBN 978-1-56305-312-2)
- The Best of "Annals of Improbable Research" (ISBN 978-0-71673-094-1)
- The Man Who Tried to Clone Himself (ISBN 978-0-45228-772-3)
