= Scott Sandford =

Astronomer and NASA scientist

Scott Sandford is an American astronomer and NASA scientist. He has studied meteorites and other specimens that travel through outer space. Sandford has also written for the science humor magazine Annals of Improbable Research.

== Education ==
Sandford attended the New Mexico Institute of Mining & Technology and Washington University in St. Louis.

== Research and career ==
Sandford uses a combination of methods of using infrared astronomy and laboratory astrophysics to find "a number of new molecular species in space, many of interest to astrobiology". His current studies in a laboratory are "of the physical, chemical, and stereoscopic properties of polycyclic aromatic hydrocarbons as well as the astrophysical ice analogs relevant to interstellar, cometary, and planetary environments". He has been a Co-Investigator for "sample return missions".

Sandford wrote, and was the co-author of, numerous approved grants and peer-reviewed papers. He has studied meteorites and other specimens that travel through outer space. He is a part of NASA Review Panels and he became an associate editor for Meteoritics & Planetary Science in 1995.

Sandford wrote that apples and oranges can be compared in the science humor magazine Annals of Improbable Research. He used fourier-transform infrared spectroscopy (FTIR) to compare a Granny Smith apple with a Sunkist orange. Sandford concluded with, "This is a somewhat startling revelation. It can be anticipated to have a dramatic effect on the strategies used in arguments and discussions in the future".

Sandford, along with fellow NASA laboratory scientists Michael Nuevo and Christopher Materese at the Ames Research Center, worked to reproduce essential elements of RNA and DNA in 2015. When they subjected common carbon and nitrogen molecules to radiation in conditions that are similar to those in outer space, three essential elements of RNA and DNA were created. The scientists used pyrimidine, a molecule in the shape of a ring that is often discovered in meteorites, which is easy to demolish with radiation. Those molecules contain carbon atoms, but it is not very stable due to it also having nitrogen. Pyrimidine is typically at risk of being destroyed as it travels in outer space when it is in the form of gas. Sandford and his two partners thought that some of the pyrimidine's molecules could potentially live through radiation by traveling through clouds, made up of dust and gas, that could absorb a large amount of the radiation. With the interior safe, "the pyrimidine's molecules would freeze onto dust grains, which might allow them to survive any radiation to which they would later be exposed." By exposing a frozen specimen to radiation in interstellar conditions, it evolved into uracil, cytosine, and thymine. Sandford said, "Our experiments suggest that once the Earth formed, many of the building blocks of life were likely present from the beginning. Since we are simulating universal astrophysical conditions, the same is likely wherever planets are formed."
