= J.P. Licks =

American ice cream store chain

- Type: Ice cream parlor
- Founded: 1981
- Founder: Vincent Petryk
- Headquarters: Jamaica Plain, Boston, Massachusetts
- Number of locations: 17 stores (2022)
- Area served: Greater Boston
- Products: Ice cream, coffee, frozen yogurt, cakes, pies, cookies, and other assorted desserts
- Website: https://jplicks.com

J.P. Licks is an ice cream store chain with 17 locations around Massachusetts. J.P. Licks also offers croissants, muffins, cookies, cupcakes, scones, and bagels. J.P. Licks pays homage to its hometown and location, Jamaica Plain, a Boston neighborhood colloquially referred to as "J.P."

== Owner and founder ==
Vincent Petryk, owner and founder of J.P. Licks, is originally from Philadelphia. After graduating from Temple University with a degree in psychology, he worked as a dishwasher at Hillary's Homemade Ice Cream, a Philadelphia ice cream store. Although he expected the job to be short-term, he ended up becoming a scooper, then an ice cream maker, and then the manager and the head ice cream maker for Hillary's. He stated, "While at Hillary's, I witnessed daily the power and magic of ice cream. I realized that ice cream connects you to some of the fondest memories of your childhood." Petryk then got married and moved to Jamaica Plain (or JP as it is known locally), which he would later call his "true hometown". For three years, he worked at Wendy's fast-food hamburger chain as a manager learning professional restaurant operations, which he felt was necessary to know before starting his own business.

At age 26, in 1981, he opened J.P. Licks a few blocks from his home in Jamaica Plain (hence, the name) with business partner Michael Herbert. They each invested $25,000 to start the store. Still, Herbert only remained part of the company for a couple of years before Petryk bought him out. J.P. Licks quickly outgrew that location where ice cream was made in the window so customers could watch the process and moved to a larger location in JP (where the restaurant Purple Cactus currently resides). In 1999, the company moved to an old fire station just across the street, and that's where the company headquarters have been ever since.

One of the first stores outside of Jamaica Plain to open was in Inman Square, Cambridge. That store no longer exists, but the second non-Jamaica Plain location to open, the Coolidge Corner, Brookline location, has been a neighborhood staple since 1988. The 17th store opened in 2019 in Andover, MA.

== Community service ==
J.P. Licks is known to donate to local charities, organizations, and schools. Not only does it give its food for various events and donates gift cards to non-profits for auctions and raffles, but it also sets up in-store charitable incentives. It supported the Starlight foundation by giving a "J.P. Licks" dollar to anyone who donated one dollar to Starlight. It has also set up a one-day special for Veterans Day where all proceeds from one-dollar coffees went to the New England Shelter for Homeless Veterans. In 2011, it had a long-term partnership with the Home for Little Wanderers and are encouraging donations through once again offering "J.P. Licks dollars" in all their stores. In 2019, J.P. Licks started holding an annual Sock Drive every February to benefit the guests of Rosie's Place. J.P. Licks is known to frequently sponsor nearby events like JP Open Studios, the JP Music Festival, and the Andover Farmers Market.

J.P. Licks also has a robust artist program, displaying the work of local artists in 16 out of 17 stores. The artists display their work free of charge, with no commission taken from sales. Some of their most notable artists include Sharif Muhammad, Ekua Holmes, who recently displayed her work at the MFA in Boston, and Robin Abrahams, otherwise known as "Miss Conduct," an advice columnist for The Boston Globe, who turned towards art during the COVID-19 lockdown in 2020.

J.P. Licks partners with several Boston-area arts organizations to elevate the visibility of arts in Boston, as the company knows that a thriving arts community means a thriving restaurant community. Some recent partners include The Boch Center, Lyric Stage Company of Boston, Actors' Shakespeare Project, and Boston Bookfest. In 2021, the only free Chess Club in Boston started using the Jamaica Plain J.P. Licks location as their Thursday evening home. It's a place where anyone of any skill level can play a match - outside in the summer, and inside in colder months - over a cup of ice cream or coffee.

Unsurprisingly, their mascot is a cow. She earned her name, Clementine, from an early supporter of the company. A local woman named Clementine frequented the first JP location, quickly befriended Vince, and "adopted" him as her grandson. Vince gave his mascot her name as a tribute to her mentorship in the company's early years.

== Awards ==
J.P. Licks has received over 400 awards, ranging from major honors to small magazine recognitions. Past awards include "Best of Boston" by Boston magazine, "Best Location - Jamaica Plain" by Boston magazine, WBZ's "A-List", and Greater Boston Chamber of Commerce's "Small Business of the Year".

== Locations ==
All J.P. Licks locations are within 20 miles of the J.P. Headquarters, so that ice cream can be delivered multiple times a week, since all ice cream is still made in the headquarters's kitchen.

Stores are located in:

- Andover
  - Park Street
- Boston
  - Boylston Street
  - Charles Street
  - Chestnut Hill
  - Jamaica Plain
  - Mission Hill
  - Newbury Street
  - South Bay
  - South Boston
- Brookline
  - Coolidge Corner
- Cambridge
  - Harvard Square
- Dedham
  - Legacy Place
- Lynnfield
  - MarketStreet
- Newton
  - Newton Centre
- Somerville
  - Assembly Row
  - Davis Square
- Wellesley
  - Wellesley Square
