= Norman Sperling =

American astronomer (born 1947)

Sperling at the University of California, Berkeley, in 2007

Norman Sperling (born March 19, 1947) is an author, editor, publisher, teacher, and telescope designer living in San Mateo, California.

Sperling received a BA from Michigan State University after graduating from Montgomery Blair High School in Silver Spring, Maryland. He followed that with an MA in History of Science from the University of California, Berkeley. He has taught astronomy and related courses at Sonoma State University, California State University, Hayward, UC Berkeley, and San Francisco State University.

== Publisher and author ==
Sperling founded astronomical supplier and publisher Everything in the Universe in 1977. He has been assistant editor for Sky & Telescope magazine and was science editor for AltaVista. As of 2011, Sperling is the editor and publisher of the Journal of Irreproducible Results, a science humor magazine. He authored What Your Astronomy Textbook Won't Tell You and Any Parent's Recipe for Great Baseball He edited and published John Dobson's book How and Why to Make a User-Friendly Sidewalk Telescope. He has also been published in Academic American Encyclopedia, Encyclopedia Americana online, Technology Review, San Francisco Examiner, Astronomy, Pacific Discovery, Journal of College Science Teaching, Mercury, Rittenhouse, Popular Astronomy, Telescope Making, Griffith Observer, Reflector, and The Pundit.

Sperling created the Catalog of North American Planetaria (CATNAP), which later expanded into the Planetarium Directory. He has been planetarium director at Duncan Planetarium, Princeton Day School, New Jersey; Rotary-Chabot Planetarium, Chabot Observatory and Science Center, California; and Edgewood Junior High School Planetarium, Maryland, and he has been a lecturer at Morrison Planetarium in San Francisco.

== Inventor ==
As an inventor, Sperling, with Mike Simmons, created the Astroscan telescope for Edmund Scientific, as well as "The Stars Above" star-finder for Spherical Concepts.

== Expert witness ==
Sperling serves occasionally as an expert witness in the field of astronomy. The most high-profile case in which he testified was known as the Billionaire Boys Club case in 1992. He was able to nullify the testimony of a key prosecution witness. The defendant was acquitted.

== Volunteer service ==
Norman Sperling is a recipient of the National Service Award by the Western Amateur Astronomers, and had been recognized "For special and meritorious service for his unusual dedication and service to the astronomical community in all areas of astronomy" by the Astronomical Association of Northern California. He is a Fellow of the International Planetarium Society (first induction).

Sperling is active in the Bay Area Skeptics, Northern California Historical Astronomy Luncheon and Discussion Association.
