= Astroscan =

Reflecting telescope

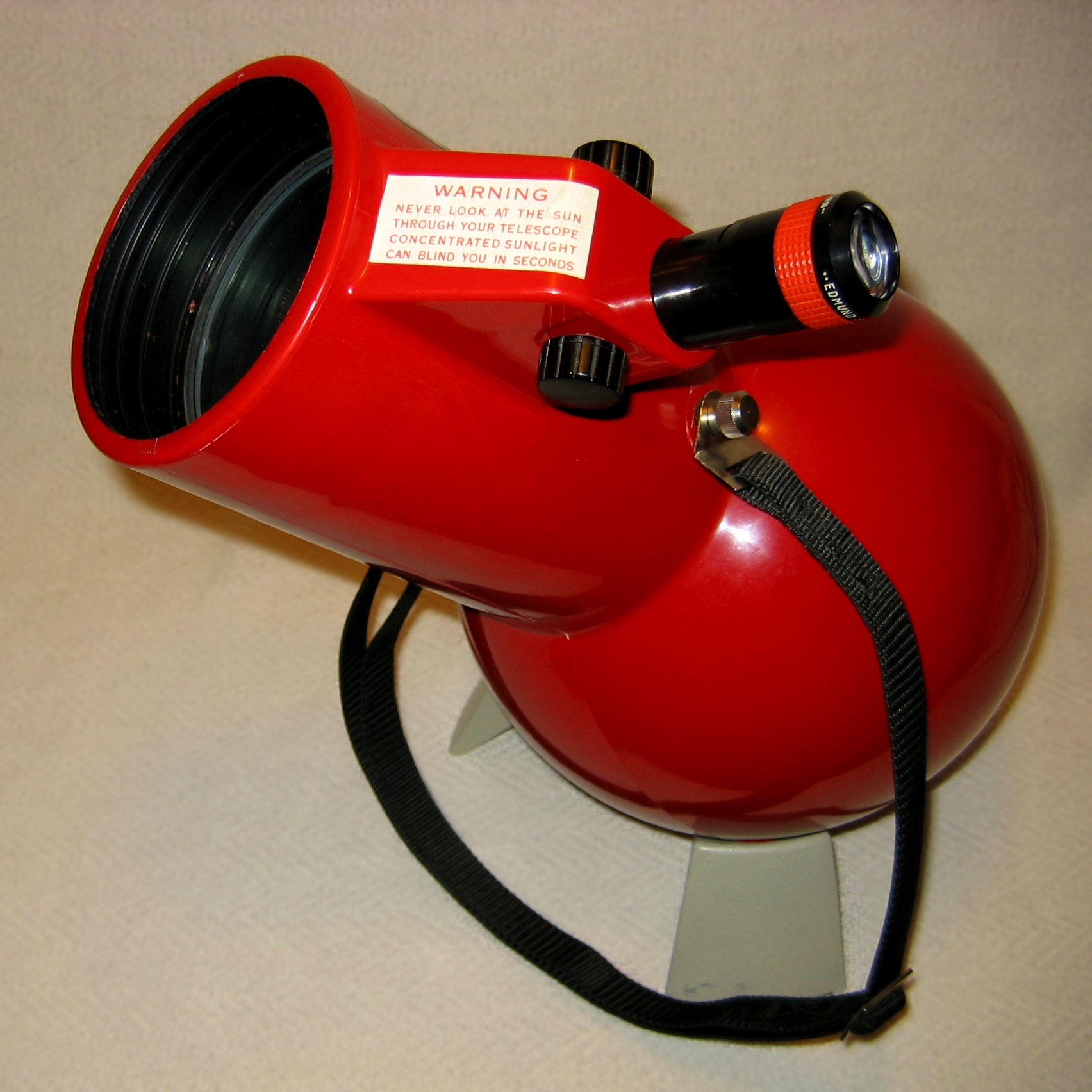
An Astroscan wide-field Newtonian reflector.

The Astroscan was a wide-field 4 1/8 in (10 cm) clear-inch diameter reflecting telescope, originally produced by the Edmund Scientific Corporation, that was for sale from 1976 to 2013.

== Design ==
The Astroscan had a Newtonian reflector layout with a 4 1/8 in (10 cm) clear-inch diameter f/4.2 aluminized and overcoated borosilicate glass parabolic primary mirror with a focal length of 17 1/2 inches (44 cm). The telescope's secondary mirror was mounted on a flat optical window at the front of the tube. Edmund designer Norman Sperling and optical engineer Mike Simmons came up with the basic design and Peter Bressler Design Associates did the detailed work on this simple introductory telescope. Rather than using a more traditional equatorial or altazimuth mount the Astroscan features a spherical housing around the primary reflector which sat in a cast aluminum cradle. The design was durable and allowed for simple operation by novice amateur astronomers; it won an Industrial Design Award in 1976. The telescope body was made from high impact acrylonitrile butadiene styrene (ABS) plastic and was equipped with a carrying strap to aid portability.

Because it was targeted at the novice market the telescope had its limitations: The general design was for low power hand-held or wide-angle work, the short f/4 focal ratio did not allow for high magnification without the image degrading, and the primary mirror was factory aligned with no provisions for adjustment. The Astroscan came with 15 mm and 28 mm focal length RKE eyepieces, giving it a magnification of 30× and 16× respectively, with a 3.0° field of view using the 28 mm eyepiece, and a 1.6° with the 15 mm.

== History ==
When Edmund Scientific introduced the telescope in 1976 they called it "The Edmund Wide-Field Telescope" with a Part Number "2001" Edmund had a public contest which ran until November 15, 1976, to come up with a name. The winning name was "Astroscan 2001". The "2001" part of the name was dropped over time.

The Astroscan continued to be available after Edmund Scientific was acquired by Science Kit and Boreal Laboratories in 2001 with the telescope for sale on the "Edmund Scientific" website. Production and sales of the telescope ceased in 2013 when the mold for the plastic body broke. In 2016 the Edmund Scientific website, now called Scientifics Direct, began offering a more common format altitude-azimuth mounted 4.5 inch table-top Newtonian telescope labeled the "Astroscan Millennium". There are reports of a Kickstarter campaign by one of the original Astroscan creators to fund production of a new version based on the original Astroscan telescope. Scientifics Direct expected to have the Astroscan back in production in early 2017. Scientifics Direct's website stated they would reintroduce the original Astroscan design in late 2020. At this time the production of the original Astroscan will be placed on hold until the quality and price point can be comparable to the original.

See the Astroscan Millennium for a comparable price point and wide-field telescope.

== See also ==
- Infinite-axis telescope
