= The Journal of Irreproducible Results =

Magazine of science humor

- Editor: Norman Sperling
- Categories: Science humor
- Frequency: Bimonthly
- Publisher: Society for Basic Irreproducible Research
- First issue: 1955
- Country: United States
- Website: The Journal of Irreproducible Results on everythingintheuniverse.com
- ISSN: 0022-2038
- OCLC: 874526298

The Journal of Irreproducible Results is a magazine of science humor. It was established in Israel in 1955 by virologist Alexander Kohn and physicist Harry J. Lipkin, who wanted a humor magazine about science, for scientists. It contains a mix of jokes, satire of scientific practice, science cartoons, and discussion of funny but real research.

As of 2026, it is published by astronomer Norman Sperling in California.

== History ==
Alexander Kohn and Harry J. Lipkin founded The Journal of Irreproducible Results in 1955 in Ness Ziona, Israel, editing together until August 1967, when Kohn became Editor-in-Chief; Lipkin remained as an associate editor. Kohn departed in 1989. The journal was published by medical researcher George H. Scherr from 1964 to 1989.

Blackwell Scientific Publications took over publication in 1990, with James A. Krosschell serving as editor and publisher. The next-to-last Blackwell issue was edited by Marc Abrahams, who left to form the rival Annals of Improbable Research and create the Ig Nobel Prize. The final Blackwell issue, volume 39, number 3, was edited by Leslie A. Gaffney.

Scherr resumed publication in 1994, acting as both publisher and editor. He pursued a number of legal complaints against Abrahams and Annals of Improbable Research. These lawsuits were ultimately unsuccessful.

In November 2001, a copy of a satirical The Journal of Irreproducible Results article titled "How To Build An Atomic Bomb In 10 Easy Steps" was found by a reporter for The Times of London among other papers in an abandoned terrorist safe house in Kabul. The Village Voice reported that the US Department of Homeland Security "acknowledged the plans had been found, but downplayed their importance".

Norman Sperling, an assistant editor at Sky & Telescope magazine, became editor and publisher in 2004. As of July 2026, he plans to transition the magazine to a digital format.

== Anthologies ==
The journal has published a number of anthologies of its articles in English, Dutch, and German. The most recent volume was published in 2008.

- Onderzoekerskunst, Alexander Kohn. 99 pages in Dutch. Amsterdam: Scheltema and Holkema Publishing Company, 1963.
- Don't Quote Me, Alexander Kohn, editor. 64 pages, paperback. Chicago Heights, Illinois: Consolidated Laboratories, Inc., 1965.
- Journal of Irreproducible Results, Selected Papers, James Ertel, compiler. 287 pages. Chicago: JIR Publishers, 1976. 1-14135761-5.
- Selected Papers: The Journal of Irreproducible Results. George H. Scherr, editor. 287 pages. Chicago Heights, Illinois: The Journal of Irreproducible Results, first and second printings, 1981. 0-9605852-1-4.
- The Best of the Journal of Irreproducible Results. George H. Scherr, editor; Richard Liebmann-Smith, associate editor. 208 pages, paperback. New York: Workman, 1983. At least 5 printings through 1989. 0-89480-595-9.
- Selected Papers: The Journal of Irreproducible Results, Third Edition. George H. Scherr, editor. 306 pages. New York: Dorset Press of Marboro Books, 1986. 0-930376-42-0.
- Journal der Unwiederholbaren Experimente, George H. Scherr, editor. 195 pages in German. Frankfurt: Wolfgang Kruger Verlag, 1986. 3-8105-1713-5.
- Journal der Unwiederholbaren Experimente II, George H. Scherr, editor. 158 pages in German. Frankfurt: Wolfgang Kruger Verlag, 1989. 3-8105-1714-3.
- Sex as a Heap of Malfunctioning Rubble (and further improbabilities): More of the Best of the Journal of Irreproducible Results. Marc Abrahams, editor. 208 pages, paperback. New York: Workman, 1993. 1-56305-312-8.
- Journal of Irreproducible Results II, George H. Scherr and Jim Glenn, editors. 214 pages. New York: Barnes & Noble, 1997. 0-7670-00428-8. Second printing 2000.
- This Book Warps Space and Time, Norman Sperling, editor. 288 pages. Kansas City, MO: Andrews McMeel Publishing, 2008. 978-0-7407-7713-4, 0-7407-7713-0.

== See also ==
- Annals of Improbable Research
- Journal of Polymorphous Perversity
