= Alberta Farmers' Co-operative Elevator Company =

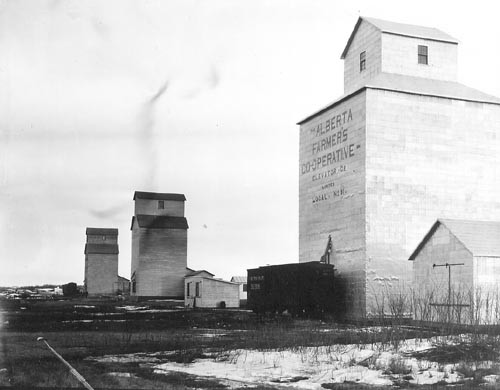
- AFCEC elevator in Viking, Alberta 1913
- Type: Farmers' cooperative
- Industry: Grain
- Founded: Alberta, Canada (25 March 1913)
- Defunct: 1 September 1917
- Successors: United Grain Growers
- Headquarters: Canada
- Area served: Alberta

The Alberta Farmers' Co-operative Elevator Company (AFCEC) was a farmer-owned enterprise that provided grain storage and handling services to farmers in Alberta, Canada between 1913 and 1917, when it was merged with the Manitoba-based Grain Growers' Grain Company (GGGC) to form the United Grain Growers (UGG). It was created at the instigation of the United Farmers of Alberta after the government of Alberta had declined to create a provincially-owned elevator system.

== Background ==
In the early 20th century wheat farming was expanding fast in the Canadian prairies. For years the prairie farmers complained of unfair treatment and lack of true competition between the existing line elevator companies, who owned the grain elevators where the grain was stored before being loaded into railway cars. In response to these complaints the Manitoba Grain Act was passed in 1900. The act was well-meaning, but at first was ineffective, and a series of amendments were needed to iron out the flaws.

The Alberta Farmers' Co-operative Elevator Company (AFCEC) had its roots in agitation by the agrarian reformer Edward Alexander Partridge of Sintaluta. The organization meeting for the Grain Growers' Grain Company (GGGC) was held in Sintaluta, Manitoba on 27 January 1906, with Partridge as the first president. The GGGC was a cooperative marketing company, but at first did not own elevators.

In 1908, Partridge published the "Partridge Plan" in which he advocated many reforms to the structure of the grain industry, including government ownership of elevators. Under pressure, the Manitoba government purchased elevators in 1910, but the operation was not successful. The Manitoba elevators were leased by the GGGC in 1912. In Saskatchewan premier Thomas Walter Scott arranged for a Royal Commission on Elevators in 1910. The commission recommended a system where the elevators would be cooperatively owned by the farmers rather than by the government. In 1911 legislation was passed by which the Saskatchewan Co-operative Elevator Company (SCEC) was incorporated to run elevators under this model.

== Foundation ==
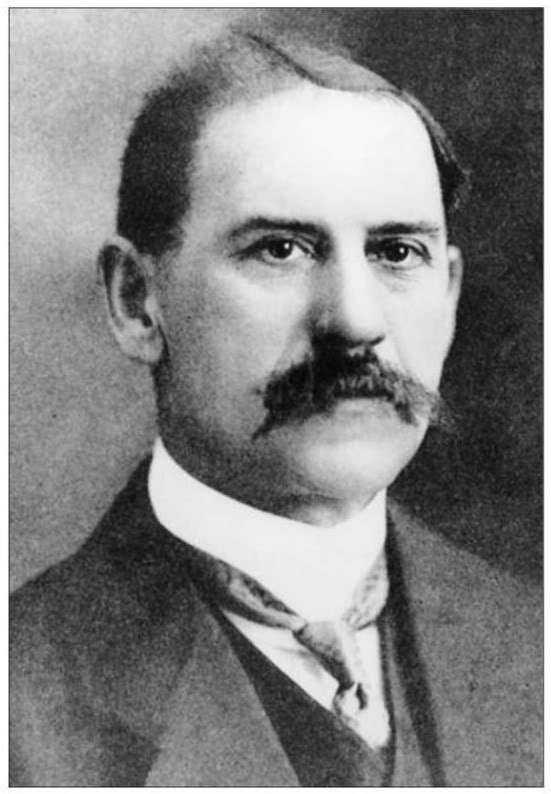
William John Tregillus, first president of the AFCEC

The United Farmers of Alberta (UFA) called on the government to own and operate elevators before 1911, but the UFA's elevator committee did not agree with way that public elevator were organized in Manitoba. In 1911 the UFA asked Alberta premier Arthur Sifton to set up a co-operative system along the same lines as Saskatchewan. Sifton declined to act. At the 1913 UFA convention the committee presented a revised proposal. While based on the act that created the Saskatchewan Co-operative Elevator Company (SCEC) in 1911, it gave more control to the farmers and let the company handle farm products of all types. The UFA delegates overwhelmingly approved the proposal. The government worked with the UFA to draft a bill of incorporation along the proposed lines.

Charles Stewart, a future premier of Alberta and an advocate of government ownership of utilities, helped pass the bill. The AFCEC was incorporated on 25 March 1913. Its purpose was to operate grain elevators, sell farm supplies and handle livestock on a cooperative basis. Shareholders' locals were formed at each location where elevators were built. The province of Alberta loaned up to 85% of the cost of building the grain elevators, while farmers raised the rest through purchase of stock. The AFCEC marketed its grain through the GGGC, which also provided financial assistance. John Edward Brownlee, the future premier of Alberta, helped the UFA with legal work associated with creation of the AFCEC, and was made the solicitor for the AFCEC in late 1913.

== History ==
Seven elevators had been purchased by the fall of 1913 and forty-two were being built. The first president was William John Tregillus (1858–1914), a rancher and businessman who had been elected president of the United Farmers of Alberta in 1912, and continued to serve in this role while president of the AFCEC. He died of typhoid fever on 12 November 1914. The AFCEC had its offices on the third floor of the Lougheed Building in Calgary, which also housed the headquarters of Tregillus Clay Products and Tregillus-Thompson Directory Publishers. Delegates at the 1915 UFA convention forced through a motion that implicitly criticized UFA officers for holding positions in the AFCEC.

The Grain Growers' Grain Company was increasingly called upon to provide financial assistance by the AFCEC, and it became clear that there would be advantages to merging the two companies. John Edward Brownlee provided valuable assistance in overcoming the political and legal obstacles to the merger. In 1917 the AFCEC combined with the GGGC to form the United Grain Growers (UGG). The SCEC was involved in the merger discussions, but in the end decided not to join the UGG. The merger was finalized on 1 September 1917. At the time of the amalgamation the AFCEC had 103 grain elevators, 122 coal sheds and 145 warehouses. The GGGC had 60 elevators, 55 coal sheds, and 78 warehouses, and also ran 137 elevators that it leased from the government of Manitoba.

Although the UGG controlled just 8% of the elevators in the early 1920s, it forced the private companies to modify their pricing and practices to remain competitive.

== Sources ==
- "Alberta's Grain Elevators - A brief history of a prairie icon" (PDF). Alberta Community Development.
- "Archives of United Grain Growers". Archives of the Agricultural Experience. University of Manitoba. Archived from the original on 2016-01-26.
- Fairbairn, Brett (2014). "SASKATCHEWAN CO-OPERATIVE ELEVATOR COMPANY (SCEC)". Encyclopedia of Saskatchewan. University of Regina. Archived from the original on 2017-07-05.
- Fairbairn, Brett (2014b). "GRAIN GROWERS' GRAIN COMPANY". Encyclopedia of Saskatchewan. Archived from the original on 2017-10-16.
- Friesen, Ron (2012-04-07). "Fair treatment for Western farmers began 100 years ago". Manitoba Co-operator.
- Foran, Max (1998). "TREGILLUS, WILLIAM JOHN". Dictionary of Canadian Biography. Vol. 14. University of Toronto/Université Laval.
- Marchildon, Gregory P. (2009). Immigration and Settlement, 1870-1939. University of Regina Press. ISBN 978-0-88977-230-4.
- Porter, Jene M. (2008-01-01). Perspectives of Saskatchewan. Univ. of Manitoba Press. ISBN 978-0-88755-353-0.
- Rennie, Bradford James (2000). The Rise of Agrarian Democracy: The United Farmers and Farm Women of Alberta, 1909-1921. University of Toronto Press. p. 142. ISBN 978-0-8020-8374-6.
- Rennie, Bradford James (2004). Alberta Premiers of the Twentieth Century. University of Regina Press. ISBN 978-0-88977-151-2.
- Smith, Donald B. (2005). Calgary's Grand Story: The Making of a Prairie Metropolis from the Viewpoint of Two Heritage Buildings. University of Calgary Press. ISBN 978-1-55238-174-8.
- "The Archives of United Grain Growers Ltd". University of Manitoba.
- "United Grain Growers Ltd. Langdon local fonds". Archives Canada. Archived from the original on 2015-09-24.
- Wetherell, Donald; Cavanaugh, Catherine; Payne, Michael (2005-10-01). Alberta Formed - Alberta Transformed. University of Alberta. ISBN 978-1-55238-196-0.
