= Robin Abrahams =

American author, journalist, and speaker

- Education: University of Kansas (BA); Boston University
- Occupations: Author; journalist; speaker
- Spouse: Marc Abrahams

Robin Abrahams is an American author, journalist, and speaker. She writes the Boston Globe Magazine weekly ethics and etiquette column "Miss Conduct".

== Early life ==
Abrahams grew up in Kansas, and earned a BA in theater at the University of Kansas. She worked various jobs for six years, including theater publicist, stand-up comedian, and volunteer at a battered women’s shelter, before coming to Massachusetts for a 2002 PhD in research psychology at Boston University.

== Business writing ==
Abrahams works as a research associate at Harvard Business School, primarily writing case studies. She has co-written business articles that appeared in the Harvard Business Review, Wall Street Journal, and MIT Sloan Management Review.

== Miss Conduct ==
Abrahams authored the "Miss Conduct" column for the Boston Globe Sunday Magazine from 2005, through February 2, 2025. and has hosted the Social Studies etiquette segment on the WGBH radio Emily Rooney Show since 2010. She has appeared on the NBC Today Show to discuss her book and give advice on unemployment etiquette.

Her book, Miss Conduct’s Mind Over Manners: Master the Slippery Rules of Modern Ethics and Etiquette was published by Times Books in May 2009. It was praised by both the Richmond Times-Dispatch and the Washington Post for amusing writing and common sense advice, though the latter said the author was "a little too fond of the latest advances in pop sociology".

== Personal life ==
Abrahams lives in Cambridge, Massachusetts and is married to Marc Abrahams, author and publisher of the Annals of Improbable Research. She gives talks about her conversion to Judaism.
