= William John Tregillus =

Canadian farmer

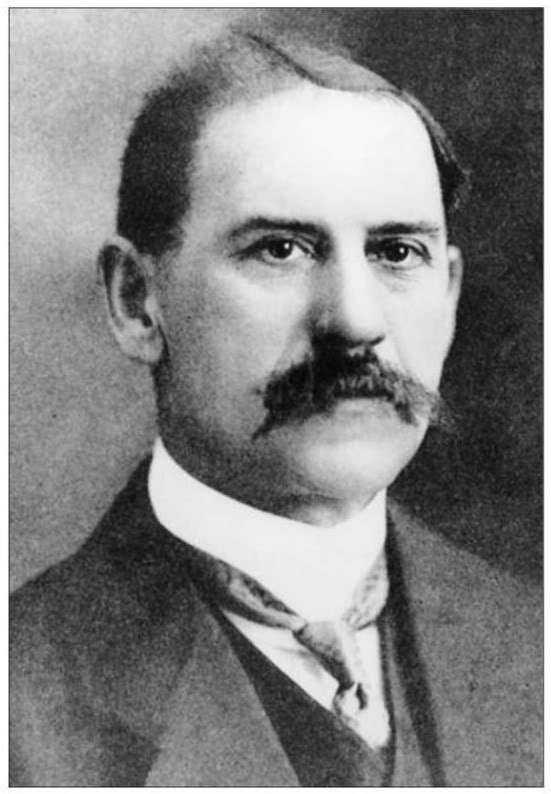
- William John Tregillus (1914)
- Born: 2 May 1858; Plymouth, England
- Died: 12 November 1914 (aged 56); Calgary, Alberta, Canada
- Occupations: Farmer, businessman

William John Tregillus (2 May 1858 – 12 November 1914) was a businessman in the United Kingdom and Canada, and also leader of Canadian agrarian organizations. The son of a miller, he became a well-to-do flour trader in England before emigrating to Calgary, Alberta. There he bred horses and then dairy cattle, became president of the United Farmers of Alberta and of the Alberta Farmers' Co-operative Elevator Company, founded a brick factory and a business directory, and was active in politics. He became a millionaire but lost most of his fortune in the Calgary depression of 1913–14. Worn out, he died of typhoid fever at the age of 56.

== Early years ==
William John Tregillus was born on 2 May 1858, eldest son of John Tregillus and Emma Daw. He was baptized in Plymouth, England. He attended school in Plympton and Plymouth, and went on to Taunton College School. He learned the miller's trade from his father. His father's business at Laughton Mills, Plympton failed on 19 July 1878. By the age of 22 William Tregillus was operating a mill that he had leased for himself. He married Lillian Chapman in 1880, and they had two boys and two girls. The family moved to Southampton around 1890 and Tregillus obtained a position in the sales department of Spillers, a major flour milling company.

Tregillus later started up his own flour milling and brokerage business, operating from his home in Freemantle, a suburb to the west of Southampton. He was one of the first to have a telephone installed in his home. He loved horses, and more than once visited horse fairs in Ireland to buy hunters on which he rode with the Chilworth and Stoneham harriers.

Tregillus had nine siblings. In May 1882 two of his brothers sailed for Canada. At first they worked as laborers for the Canadian Pacific Railway, then started to prospect for gold. They were successful, and after a world tour returned to England in 1900 for a family reunion. His brothers' stories of Canada seem to have inspired William Tregillus to move there.

== Rancher and dairy farmer ==
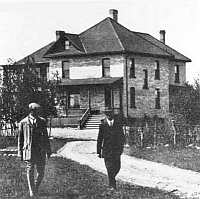
Sydney Owen Tregillus and William John Tregillus outside Roscarrock

Tregillus emigrated to Canada with his wife and their two youngest children, arriving in Calgary in August 1902.

They were accompanied by his wife's companion and helper and their groom. Tregillus leased a quarter section of land along the south shore of the Bow River just west of Calgary. He later expanded his holdings by buying three adjacent quarter sections from the Canadian Pacific Railway. He built a large two-story brick house with outbuildings that he called "Roscarrock", the name of the place in Cornwall where his family had originated. He continued to buy land until he owned over 1,000 acres, and leased another 2,500 acres.

Tregillus imported horses from British Columbia for sale to new settlers. He also bred hackneys for his personal use.

He then became interested in the dairy business, and built one of the best herds of Holsteins in Alberta. This evolved into a stock operation, supplying dairy herds to other farms.

Tregillus loaned several cows to the Alberta Department of Agriculture in 1905 for use in demonstrations. He was seen as an expert and spoke to farm groups across the province about the benefits of pure-bred cattle. His dairy, in which he employed young men he brought from England, was the first in Calgary to pasteurize milk.

== Farmers' spokesperson ==
In 1906 Tregillus joined the Canadian Society of Equity, a farmers' organization that was an offshoot of the American Society of Equity. In 1909 the CSE merged with the Alberta Farmers' Association to become the United Farmers of Alberta (UFA). Tregillus and R.C. Owens led the drive to unite the two groups. Edmonton farmers Rice Sheppard and William Ball were also active in the merger project.

In 1910 Tregillus was elected vice-president of the UFA, and that year led a delegation of farmers to Vancouver to explore the possibility of shipping grain via the west coast, which promised to be an economically viable route once the Panama Canal opened (in 1914).

On 16 December 1910 more than 800 farmer delegates, mostly from the prairies, gathered at Ottawa and marched up Parliament Hill to meet Prime Minister Wilfrid Laurier in the "Siege of Ottawa". Tregillus was among them. Although the farmers were fobbed off with vague assurances, the farmers had proved they were capable of national organization.

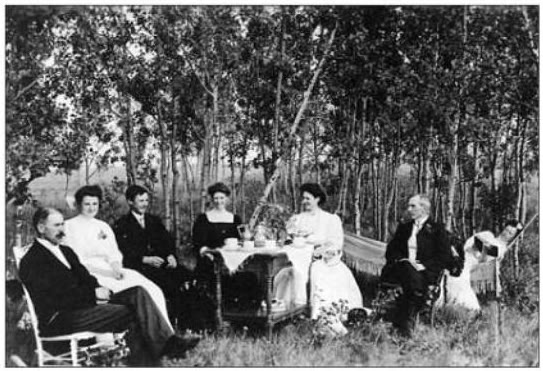
Tregillus family photograph (1908). William John Tregillus is seated on the left.

At the 1910 convention of the UFA Tregillus proposed that a planned agricultural college be built in southern Alberta, and that it should be independent of the newly founded University of Alberta in Strathcona (now part of Edmonton). The convention endorsed a motion by Edward Michener to have the UFA executive board consult the government about having separate agricultural college. Tregillus opposed the suggestion, saying the premier and the president of the university were behind this motion and that friends of the premier had land in Strathcona and would benefit from the college being part of the UofA, and this was the real reason for choosing Strathcona as the location of the UofA.

Eventually the UFA board agreed that the college could be co-located with the UofA as long as farmers were represented on its board and agricultural schools were built elsewhere in Alberta. (The Vermilion agricultural school and others were partly the result of this position.)

Tregillus was elected UFA president in 1912 and held this office for the rest of his life. He was an effective and well-liked leader, and helped persuade more farmers to join the organization.

Tregillus claimed the siege of Ottawa had "awakened the people of this great Dominion ... to their possibilities and their duty". He used the siege to promote the idea of a shared and noble past among farmers, and spoke publicly and wrote articles in which he told farmers they were the sole source of wealth, and their ancient, honorable and healthful occupation resulted in integrity and character. He said farmers "estimate ourselves too low, and others take us at our valuation."

Tregillus was in favor of bringing women into the farmers' movement, saying that he expected that their innate purity and maternal instinct would improve the ethics of the society, promote mutual aid and benefit the UFA "socially".

Many farmers were believers in direct legislation, where law-makers would be held accountable through voters having the power of initiative, referendum and recall. Soon after the UFA's 1910 convention a direct legislation league was formed in Alberta, and Tregillus was its president. Tregillus wrote in the Grain Growers' Guide on 13 July 1910, "I have no further sympathy with 'party politics' and will in future only support those candidates who will pledge themselves to the following: Direct Legislation, the Initiative, Referendum and the right of Recall." The Alberta legislature passed a direct legislation act in 1913. The Alberta Federation of Labour (AFL) was founded in 1912, and Tregillus was elected a vice-president. However, the UFA was not willing to form an alliance with the AFL since many of its members did not support a farmer-labour alliance. Tregillus came to support the idea of farmers forming a political party and directly participating in elections, but no progress was made by the time of his death.

== Other activities ==
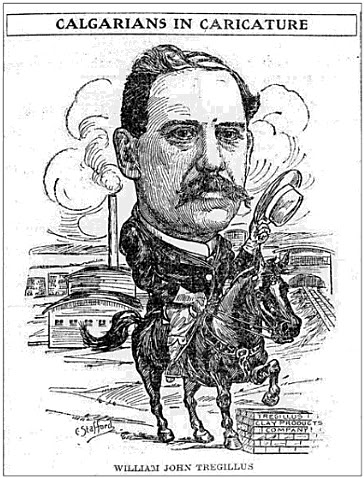
Caricature of Tregillus in front of his clay products factory. Calgary News Telegram (5 May 1913)

The Tregillus family made a grand tour of Europe in 1911. Tregillus attended an international agricultural conference in Rome. On their return, he raised CAN$1 million to build a modern brick, tile and sewer pipe factory that used high-quality clay from the north edge of his property. The plant would employ 250 men at first, rising to 500 men after six months and eventually to 1,000 workers. The plant was sited in the area now called Wildwood. The Tregillus Clay Products Company began operation in 1912, and eventually produced 150,000 wire-cut tapestry bricks daily. It was the largest such enterprise in southern Alberta, and Tregillus was described by a newspaper as one of the sixteen millionaires in Calgary. He also produced a business directory for Calgary, one of the first in the city. He helped with the formation of the Alberta Farmers' Co-operative Elevator Company (AFCEC) in 1913, and served as its first president. The AFCEC had its offices on the third floor of the Lougheed Building in Calgary, which also housed the headquarters of Tregillus Clay Products and Tregillus-Thompson Directory Publishers.

Tregillus chaired the Calgary school board and was vice-president of the Canadian Council of Agriculture. He advocated a comprehensive city plan, writing in a 1911 letter to the Morning Albertan that "Calgarians . . . would fail ignominiously in their duty did they not look at least a hundred years ahead." In 1912 Tregillis donated 160 acres (65 ha) of land for a new University of Calgary, to be run as a private enterprise, and gave a $50,000 endowment to the institution. He served as secretary. The University of Calgary began giving classes in October 1912 in the Carnegie Library. However, it was opposed by Henry Marshall Tory, president of the University of Alberta. Tory lobbied successfully against legislation to let the university grant degrees. Tregillus was president of the Calgary Horticultural Society and the Calgary Choral Society, a city alderman from 1913, and for a period was acting mayor of Calgary.

In early 1913 there was an unexpected crash in the Calgary real estate market, after many years of boom. Tregillus had difficulty staying afloat. The depressed market meant his landholdings lost most of their value and his clay factory could not sell its products. As tension mounted before World War I (1914–18), Tregillus was opposed to involvement by Canada. At the UFA's annual convention in January 1914 he asked, "Shall we be a great, peaceful and prosperous country or shall we be simply the appanage and humble subordinate of a great military Power?" On 13 February 1914 Tregillus was unable to meet a bill of $4,550. Late in July 1914 he resigned from the Board of the University of Calgary. The university was closed soon after.

William John Tregillus hurt himself in a fall at a Grain Growers' Grain Company meeting in Winnipeg in November 1914. He paid little attention to the injury at the time, but complications set in on the journey back to Calgary. He was in poor health, worn out by his other concerns. He died of typhoid fever on 12 November 1914 in Calgary.

== Sources ==
- Balkan, Donna (October 2009). "United We Farm". Alberta Views. 12 (8).
- Foran, Max (1998). "TREGILLUS, WILLIAM JOHN". Dictionary of Canadian Biography. Vol. 14. University of Toronto/Université Laval.
- Hansen, Kai (2005-01-01). Relocation 101: Focus on Calgary. Relocation 101: Books, Canada. ISBN 978-0-9738710-0-5.
- Rennie, Bradford James (2000). The Rise of Agrarian Democracy: The United Farmers and Farm Women of Alberta, 1909-1921. University of Toronto Press. ISBN 978-0-8020-8374-6.
- Rennie, Bradford James (2004). Alberta Premiers of the Twentieth Century. University of Regina Press. ISBN 978-0-88977-151-2.
- Seyd, Richard (1885). Record of failures and liquidations in the financial, international, wholesale and manufacturing branches of commerce ... in the United Kingdom ... 1865 to ... 1876. 1865 to 1884.
- Smith, Donald B. (2005). Calgary's Grand Story: The Making of a Prairie Metropolis from the Viewpoint of Two Heritage Buildings. University of Calgary Press. ISBN 978-1-55238-174-8.
- Smith, Donald B. (2007). Honoré Jaxon: Prairie Visionary. Coteau Books. ISBN 978-1-55050-367-8.
- "William J. Tregillus fonds". Archives Canada.
- "William John Tregillus". Tregilgas Tree.
