= Infinite-axis telescope =

Type of telescope mount

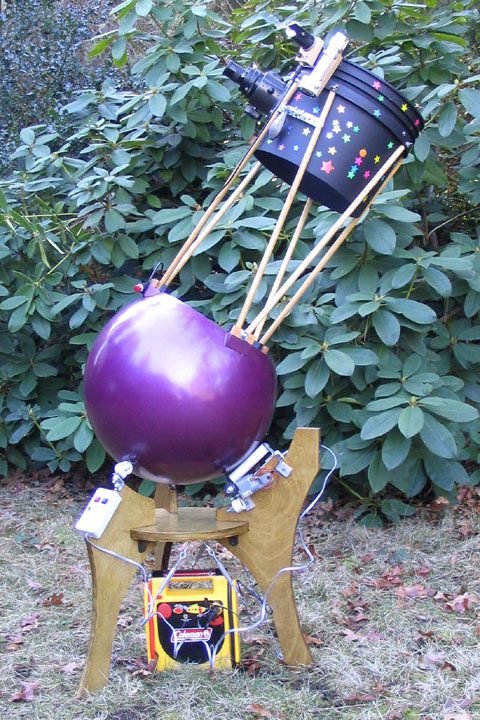
"Trackball" equatorial drive ball mount telescope

An infinite-axis telescope is a telescope that can move freely in all directions. Such telescopes can be mechanically simple hand-guided versions with the mounting serving only to carry the weight of the telescope although there are equatorial versions.

== Types ==
An example of this type of telescope was the late 17th century "Air" or "Aerial telescope", which was a very long focal length refracting telescope that did not use a tube. In these telescopes a hand held eyepiece and an objective mounted on a ball joint were connected by a string. The observer kept the string tight and moved the eyepiece to aim the telescope.

Another example of an infinite-axis telescope is a ball-in-cup mounted telescope, also called a spherical-mounted telescope. The first Newtonian telescope was mounted in this way; the ball was held in place by wrought iron springs. Another type uses bowling balls as a mount axis. There are modern commercial and amateur mount designs for Newtonian telescopes that have the "ball" built into the base of the optical tube assembly. These mounts have the advantage of being mechanically simple and allow the observer to rotate the eyepiece to any side of the telescope for easier viewing. Some types have even been adapted for equatorial tracking by motorizing one of the bearing surfaces to turn the ball at the rate of one revolution per day. This rotates the telescope's ball exactly opposite the rotation of the Earth, thus keeping the telescope stationary with respect to the stars.

Small, hand-held (richest-field) telescopes may also qualify as infinite-axis telescopes.

An advantage of infinite-axis telescopes is that there is no "dead-zone" where one axis must move infinitely fast in order to track the stars, as is the case with alt-azimuth mounts.

== Gallery ==
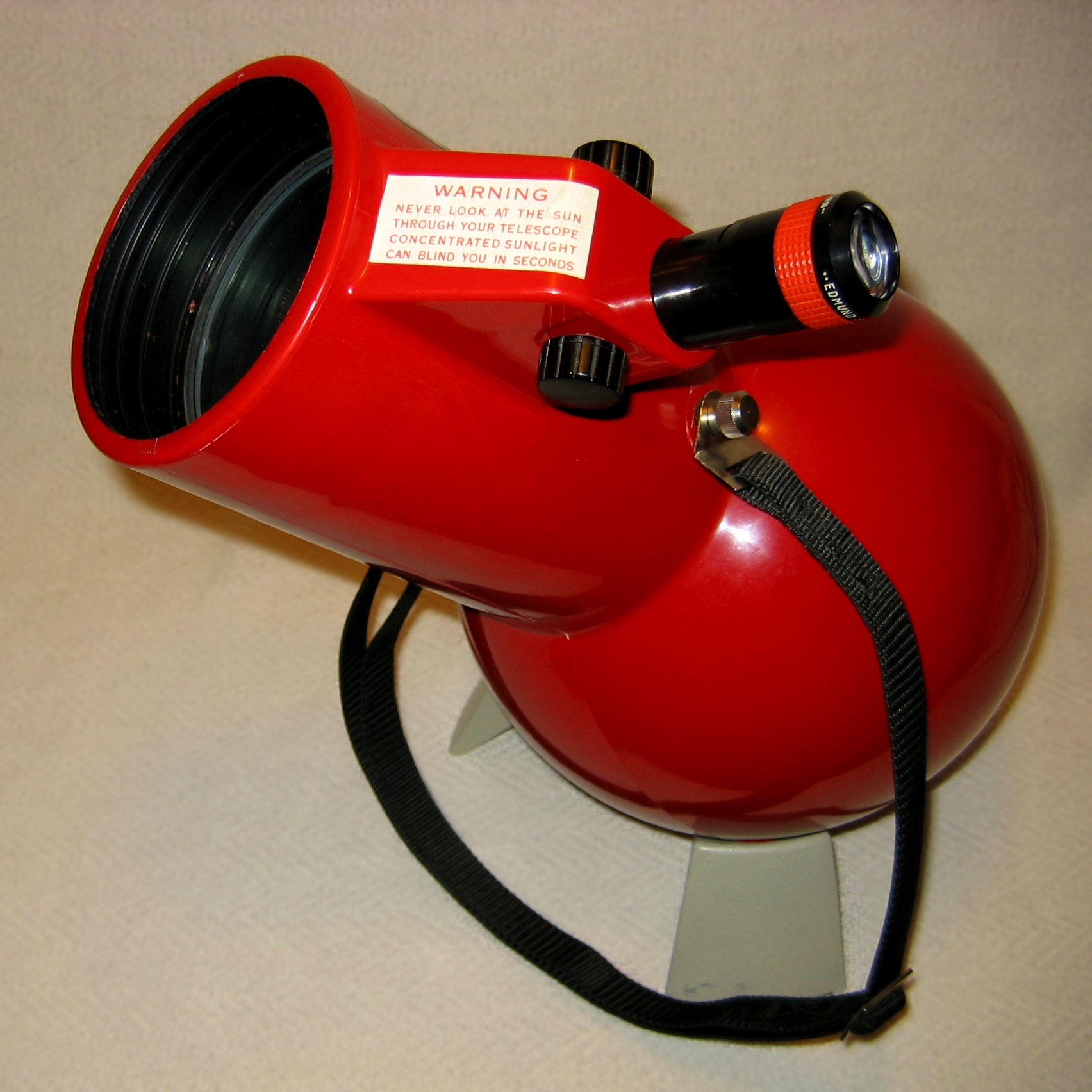
Astroscan

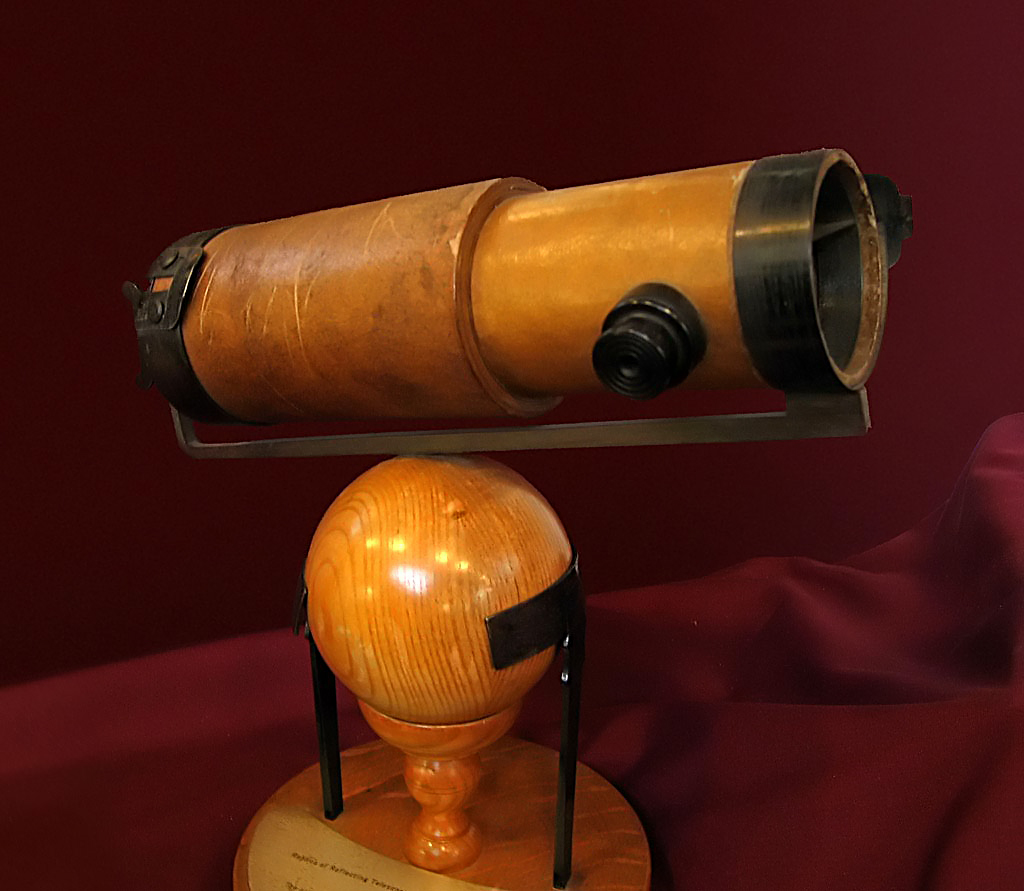
Replica of Newton's reflector

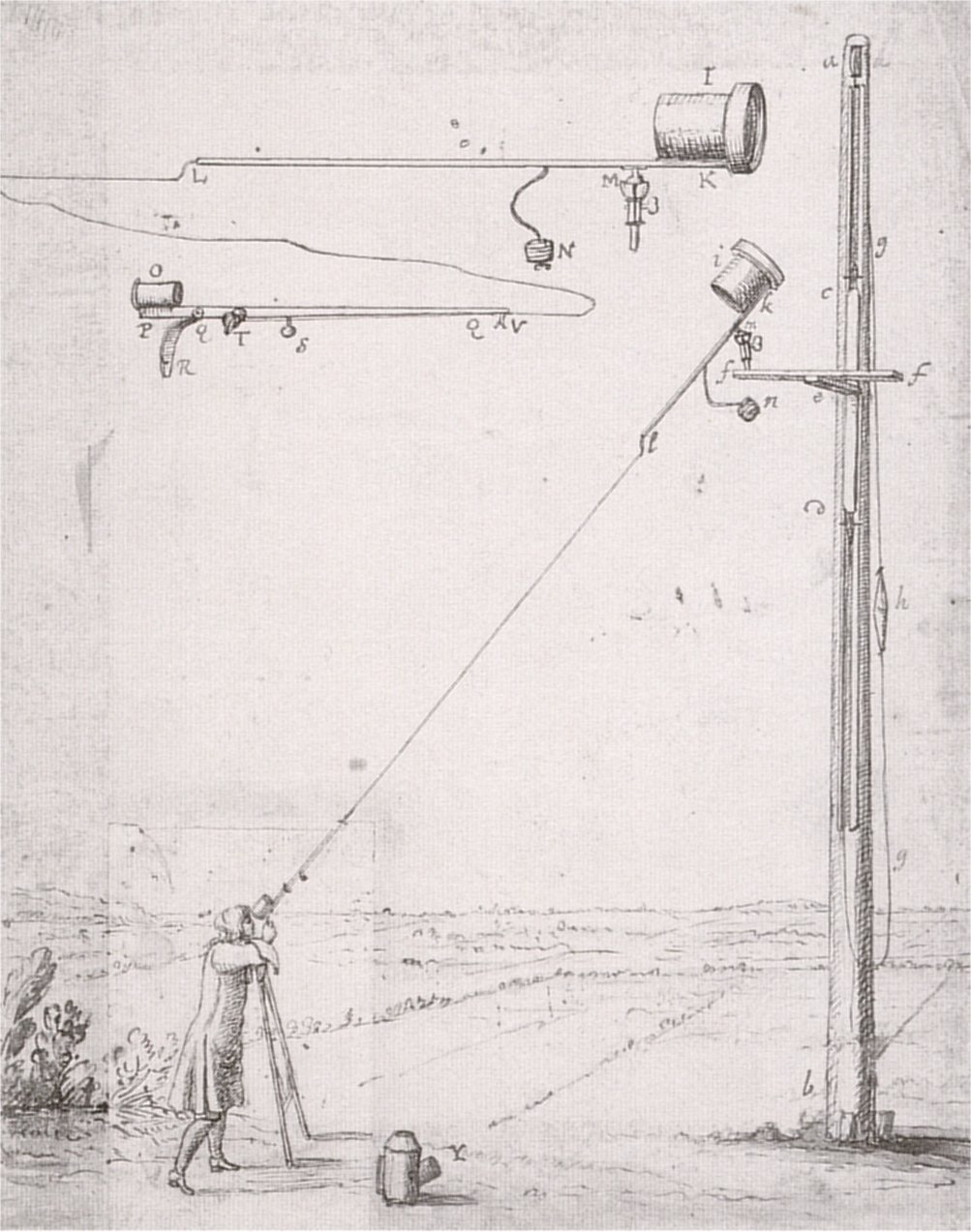
Aerial telescope

== See also ==
- History of the telescope
- List of telescope types
