= Public Service Salary Restraint Act =

Act of the Legislature of Alberta

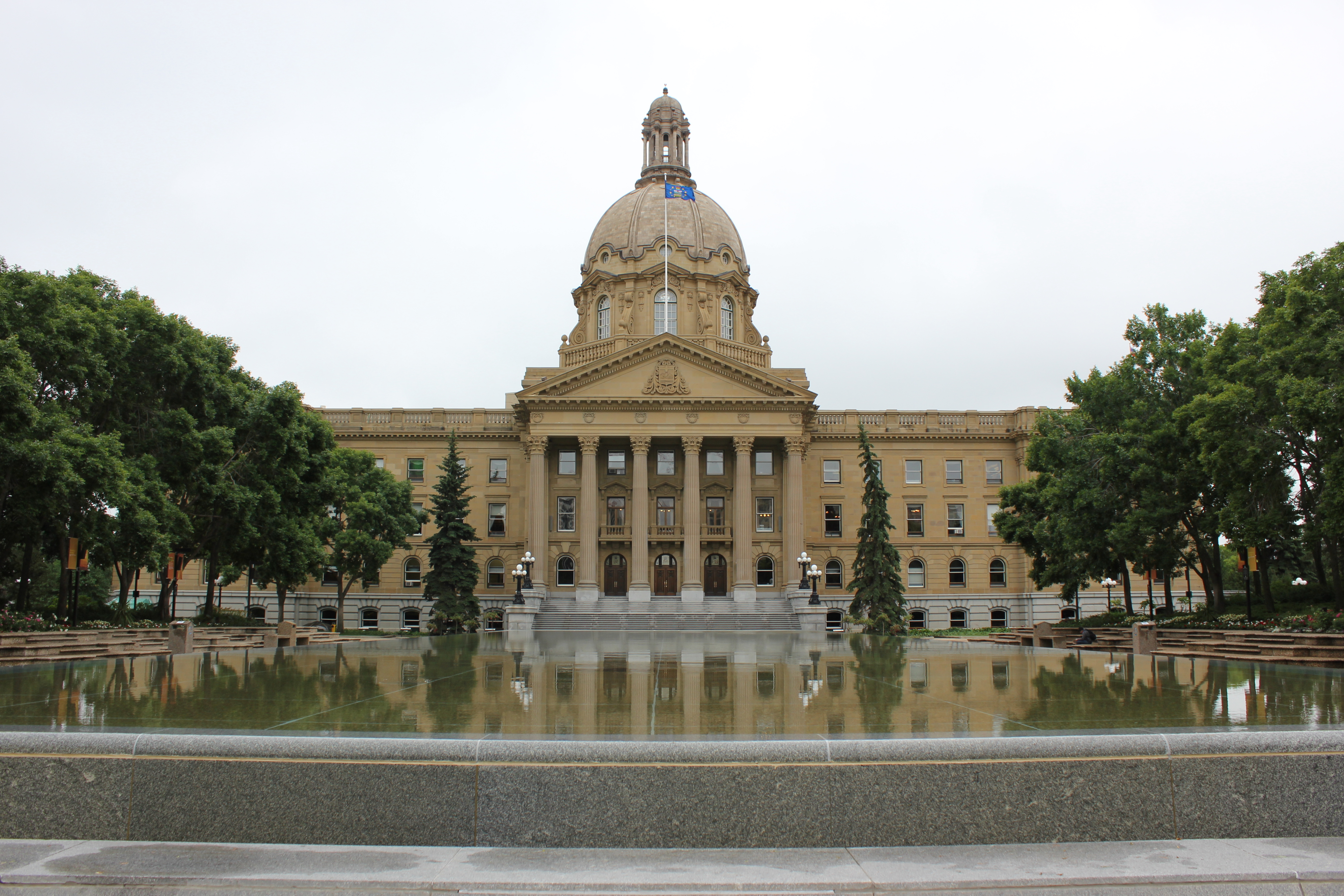

Legislative Assembly of Alberta
- Enacted by: Legislative Assembly of Alberta

Legislative history
- Bill citation: Bill 46
- Introduced by: Doug Horner, Minister of Finance
- First reading: November 27, 2013
- Second reading: December 2, 2013
- Third reading: December 4, 2013

The Public Service Salary Restraint Act (informally referred to as Bill 46) is an Act of the Legislature of Alberta. The bill was introduced by the Progressive Conservative government in 2013.

== History ==
The Bill was introduced during the 28th Alberta Legislature in 2013 by Finance Minister Doug Horner. The bill passed first, second, and third readings, given royal proclamation, and went into effect on December 11, 2013. The law applies only to negotiations with the province's largest public-sector union, the Alberta Union of Provincial Employees (AUPE).

=== Government position ===
The Alberta government described the legislation as a necessary measure for "hold(ing) the line on public sector salaries" with the intent to "bring AUPE back to the negotiating table."

=== Union position ===
AUPE launched a legal challenge against the bill, which threatens to impose a wage deal on the 22,000 members of the union. The union claimed that Bill 46 was introduced with little warning and no consultation with the union or its members.

Dave Hancock, then Government House Leader, invoked closure, "imposing severe limitations on debate ... allowing Bill 46 to be passed extremely quickly," the statement says. The union also claims in the lawsuit that the bill creates an environment where good-faith bargaining is impossible. "Furthermore, free collective bargaining cannot take place within the long shadow cast by Bill 46," the statement of claim says. Statements of claim contain allegations that are not proven in court. A statement of defence has not yet been filed.

A statement of claim filed in December 2013 claims that the bill "was introduced with no consultation, was rammed through the legislature and violates its members' fundamental freedoms under the Charter." AUPE at that time was without a collective agreement from March 2013, and negotiations had broken down earlier in the year, subsequent mediation also failing. The union claimed that the province had agreed to arbitration in 2014. Arbitration had not been sought by the union for over 30 years. The Bill would effectively end the option of arbitration and instead impose a settlement by a January 31, 2014 deadline, giving 0% salary increases automatically for the next two fiscal years, followed by 1% increases the following two years. The statement of claim asks the court to strike the law down and reinstate arbitration, award unspecified damages, costs incurred during bargaining and in preparation for arbitration.

=== Legal challenge and outcomes ===
In February 2014 Court of Queen's Bench Justice Denny Thomas granted an indefinite injunction against the Bill saying "the legislation could irreparably harm labour relations, guts the collective bargaining process and effectively emasculates the AUPE"

In a firmly worded decision, Court of Queen’s Bench Justice Denny Thomas wrote that the government had not negotiated in good faith and appeared to have intended to impose the 2011 collective agreement from the outset. Justice Thomas also wrote that in his opinion the legislation was a "clear" case of a breach of Canada’s Charter of Rights and Freedoms. "The effect is much more than a salary cap, instead it freezes all of the non-monetary features of the relationship as well. In addition, it guts the bargaining process by removing any effective leverage on the part of the workers who, as a result of other provincial laws, cannot withdraw their labour."

One source notes that "(t)he injunction suspends the new law and clears the way for the union to proceed with a Charter challenge."

After the injunction, Premier Alison Redford continued to defend the legislation and "reiterated the government’s intent to appeal the judge’s order." In March 2014, Redford resigned as Premier of Alberta. Guy Smith, President of AUPE, intimated that Bill 46 may have contributed to the decline in popularity that led to her decision to resign.

If the Conservatives want to signal the contentious Redford era is over, interim Premier Dave Hancock should seriously consider dropping draconian Bill 46 that suspended collective bargaining and imposed a wage settlement on 22,000 public servants. Hancock could start by reversing the government’s decision to an Alberta Court of Queen's Bench ruling that suspended temporarily Bill 46 last month. "Then they need to need to remove Bill 46 which is a hammer looming over what should be free collective bargaining," said Smith. "Hancock is an intelligent man who understands the lay of the land. He can change the tone of relations and return to respectful dealings between government and its front line employees." The next leader should be aware that Redford’s hard line on labour contributed to her serious slide in the polls, he added.

On April 28, 2014, details emerged of a deal reached between the Hancock government and the AUPE. The tentative agreement called for a lump-sum payment of $1,850 the first year followed by pay increases totalling 6.75 per cent over three years. Members of the AUPE will vote on the agreement in June 2014 before the government ratifies it.

The deal was announced Monday, the same day the government dropped its appeal of an injunction the union won against legislation that would have imposed an austere contract similar to ones that went into effect last year for Alberta physicians and teachers.

== Links ==
- Bill 46: Public Service Salary Restraint Act - Legislative Assembly of Alberta Website
- PDF version of the Bill (Government of Alberta website)
- AUPE website UNDERSTANDING Bill 46
