= Journal of Polymorphous Perversity =

Journal of Polymorphous Perversity is a satirical magazine about psychology, established and published by American psychologist Glenn Ellenbogen. Between 1984 and 2003, a total of 40 issues were published, with articles written by professionals and lay people. There are four published collections of articles: Oral Sadism and the Vegetarian Personality (1987), The Primal Whimper (1989), Freudulent Encounters (1992), and More Oral Sadism And The Vegetarian Personality (1996).

== See also ==
- Annals of Improbable Research
- Journal of Irreproducible Results
