= Apples and oranges =

Comparing items that cannot be compared

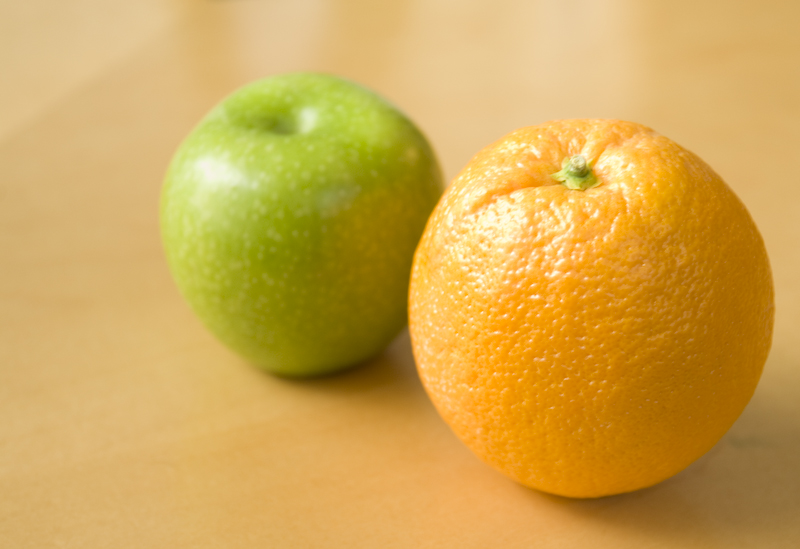
An apple and an orange, not to be practically compared

A comparison of apples and oranges occurs when two items or groups of items are compared that cannot be practically compared, typically because of inherent or fundamental differences between the objects.

The idiom, comparing apples and oranges, refers to the differences between items which are popularly thought to be incomparable or incommensurable, such as apples and oranges. The idiom may also indicate that a false analogy has been made between two items, such as where an apple is faulted for not being a good orange.

== Variants ==
The idiom is not only used in English.

In European French the idiom is comparer des pommes et des poires (to compare apples and pears) or comparer des choux et des carottes (to compare cabbages and carrots). The former is the same as the German Äpfel mit Birnen vergleichen.

For all varieties of Spanish, comparar peras con manzanas (to compare pears and apples) or sumar peras con manzanas (to add pears and apples). In Latin American Spanish, it is comparar papas y boniatos (to compare potatoes and sweet potatoes). In Peninsular Spanish, juntar churras con merinas (mix Churras with Merinos, two breeds of sheep) and confundir el tocino con la velocidad (confuse bacon and speed).

Italian (sommare le mele con le pere) and Romanian (a aduna merele cu perele) also compare pears and apples.

In Portuguese, a common formal expression is misturar alhos com bugalhos (to mix garlic with oak galls). However, a ubiquitous and much more popular colloquialism used to point out a total lack of logic is o que é que o cu tem a ver com as calças? (literally, "what does the ass have to do with the trousers?").

In Serbian, it is Поредити бабе и жабе (Porediti babe i žabe) (to compare grandmothers and toads). In Romanian, it is baba și mitraliera (the grandmother and the machine gun) and vaca și izmenele (the cow and the longjohns).

Some languages compare dissimilar properties of dissimilar items. In Danish, Hvad er højest, Rundetårn eller et tordenskrald? (Which is greatest, the Round Tower or a thunderclap?), referring to the size of the former and the sound of the latter. In Russian, сравнивать тёплое с мягким (sravnivatʹ tjoploje s mjagkim) (to compare warm and soft) is used. In Argentina, a common question is ¿En qué se parecen el amor y el ojo del hacha? (What does love and the eye of an axe have in common?). In Colombia, confundir la mierda con la pomada (to confuse shit with ointment) is used. In Polish, a similar idiomatic question is co ma piernik do wiatraka? (What does the gingerbread have to do with the windmill?). In Chinese, a similar phrase is used: 风马牛不相及 (fēng mǎ niú bù xiāng jí) (horses and cattle won't mate with each other).

A humorous variant is to replace "oranges" with something utterly dissimilar to apples; most famously, Jack Horner said that comparing science and religion is like comparing "apples and sewing machines." The idea is that although dissimilar, apples and oranges are at least fruits and at least share rudimentary similarities, whereas comparing them to something entirely different, such as pine cones or light bulbs, highlights how patently absurd making a comparison between the two is. This may be extended even further, comparing the fruit to non-physical concepts, such as "apples and jury nullification".

A particular related idiom found in accounting and economics is that of the "apples to apples comparison"; such comparisons are meant to filter out such complicating factors as accounting standards, size and scale and time periods. For example, same-store sales is widely used as measurement because it allows a direct comparison of how the business is doing ignoring growth, which can be a significant complicating factor.

== Published comparisons ==
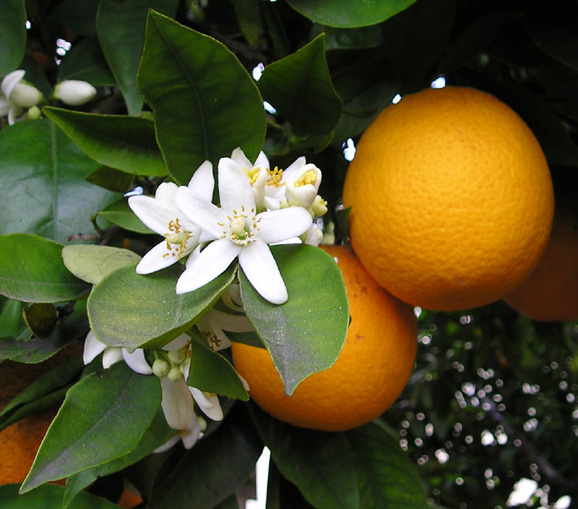
Oranges, like apples, grow on trees.

At least two tongue-in-cheek scientific studies have been conducted on the subject, each of which concluded that apples can be compared with oranges reasonably easily and on a low budget, and the two fruits are quite similar.

The first study, conducted by Scott Sandford of the NASA Ames Research Center, used infrared spectroscopy to analyze both apples and oranges. The study, which was published in the satirical science magazine Annals of Improbable Research, concluded: "... the comparing apples and oranges defense should no longer be considered valid. This is a somewhat startling revelation. It can be anticipated to have a dramatic effect on the strategies used in arguments and discussions in the future."

A second study, written by Stamford Hospital's surgeon-in-chief James Barone and published in the British Medical Journal, noted that the phrase apples and oranges was appearing with increasing frequency in the medical literature, with some notable articles comparing "Desflurane and propofol" and "Salmeterol and ipratropium" with "apples and oranges". The study also found that both apples and oranges were sweet, similar in size, weight, and shape, that both are grown in orchards, and both may be eaten, juiced, and so on. The only significant differences found were in terms of seeds (the study used seedless oranges), the involvement of Johnny Appleseed, and color.

The Annals of Improbable Research subsequently noted that the "earlier investigation was done with more depth, more rigour, and, most importantly, more expensive equipment" than the British Medical Journal study.

On April Fools' Day 2014, The Economist compared worldwide production of apples and oranges from 1983 to 2013, and noted them to be "unrelated variables".

== Units ==
While references to comparing apples and oranges are often a rhetorical device, references to adding apples and oranges are made in the case of teaching students the proper uses of units. Here, the warning not to "add apples and oranges" refers to the requirement that two quantities with different units may not be combined by addition, although they may always be combined in ratio form by multiplication, so that multiplying ratios of apples and oranges is allowed. Similarly, the concept of this distinction is often used metaphorically in elementary algebra.

== See also ==
- Exception that proves the rule
- False equivalence
- Genetic fallacy
- Law of identity
- Rhetorical device
- Umbrella term
