= Harry J. Lipkin =

Israeli theoretical physicist

- הארי ליפקין
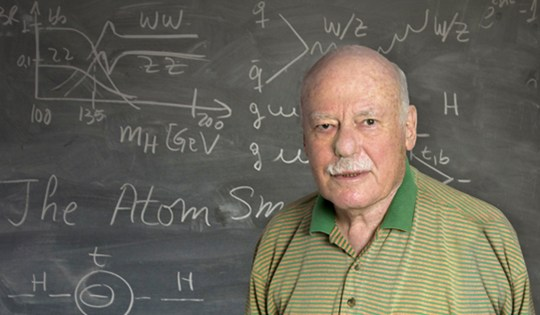
- Harry Lipkin
- Born: June 16, 1921; New York, New York
- Died: September 15, 2015 (aged 94); Rehovot, Israel
- Education: Princeton University
- Awards: Weizmann Prize(1993); Wigner Medal (2002)
- Scientific career
- Fields: Theoretical physics
- Thesis: The Scattering of Positrons and Electrons by Nuclei (1951)
- Doctoral advisor: Milton G. White

Harry Jeannot Lipkin (Hebrew: הארי ליפקין; June 16, 1921 – September 15, 2015), also known as Zvi Lipkin, was an Israeli theoretical physicist specializing in nuclear physics and elementary particle physics. He is a recipient of the prestigious Wigner Medal.

== Biography ==
Lipkin was born in New York, New York, United States and attended high school in Rochester, New York. He studied electrical technology at Cornell University, also attending physics courses by Hans Bethe and Bruno Rossi, and graduated in 1942. During the Second World War he worked as an engineer at the MIT Radiation Laboratory, developing a radar receiver. In 1950 he was awarded a doctoral degree from Princeton University, where he studied under David Bohm. Lipkin described his experiments as the first to show that positrons could be described by the Dirac equation.

In 1950 Lipkin emigrated to Israel with his wife Malka, partly to become involved with the Kibbutz movement. Instead of agricultural work, the Israeli government assigned him to spend a year at CEA Saclay, a French Atomic Energy Commission facility, to acquire knowledge to support the planned opening of Israel's first nuclear reactor at Dimona. In 1954 he returned to work in Israel, establishing the country's first course in nuclear physics at the Weizmann Institute of Science in Rehovot. Between 1956 and 1958 he served as an advisor to the United Nations Atomic Energy Commission. In later years he worked frequently with the Argonne National Laboratory in the United States. In 2007 Lipkin was working at the Weizmann Institute and at the Sackler Institute of Tel Aviv University.

== Research ==
Lipkin is noted for his applications of group theory in physics and his modelling of the quark during the 1960s. His book "Lie Groups for Pedestrians" was widely used and inspired a number of further essays and books in physics, its name anticipating a later well-known book series "For Dummies".

During the 1980s Lipkin began working with educational theorist Nira Altalef to develop LITAF, a method for teaching children to read, in response to the particular challenges Israeli educators faced in teaching classes of children from multilingual immigrant populations to read.

In 1955 Lipkin and the virologist Alexander Kohn founded the science parody magazine Journal of Irreproducible Results after convening the first international conference for nuclear physics in Israel. The journal inspired the rival Annals of Improbable Research, from which were to emerge the Ig Nobel Prize awards.

Lipkin received the Rothschild Prize in 1973, the Kaplun Prize in 1980, a Sackler Scholarship in 1992–1993, a Weizmann Prize of the City of Tel Aviv in 1994, and the Wigner Medal in 2002.

== Selected publications ==
- Uses of Lieschen Groups in Physics, Mannheim, BI university paperback 1967
- Lie Groups for Pedestrians, North Holland 1965, 2nd edition 1966, Dover 2002
- Beta Decay for Pedestrians, North Holland 1962
- Quantum Mechanics - New Approaches to Selected Topics, North Holland 1973
- The Middle East for Pedestrians: A collection of letters written before, during and after the Yom Kippur War, 1974
