= Edmund Scientific Corporation =

Retailer of optical parts and educational science toys and kits

Edmund Scientific Corporation, based in Barrington, New Jersey, was a retailer that supplied science related items to educational institutions and hobbyists. Founded in 1942 as a retailer of surplus optical parts like lenses, it later branched out into selling a wide variety of new and used experimental hardware, military surplus, multimedia equipment, educational toys, telescopes and microscopes. They marketed their products through their mail order sales and associated catalogs, and also maintained a retail presence at their factory store.

The company was split into a retail and an industrial optics divisions in the mid-1980s and in 2001 they closed the retail space and sold off the consumer products catalog operation. The industrial division, Edmund Optics, continues to operate out of the same Barrington, New Jersey location.

== History ==
=== Origins ===
In 1942, amateur photographer Norman W. Edmund (1916–2012) found it hard to find lenses he needed for his hobby. He found that the military was happy to sell off less-than-perfect optics for next to nothing and began using these. Buying in bulk, he began to sell his own surplus through advertisements in photography magazines. It was so successful he founded "'Edmund Salvage Corporation'" in 1942. Working from a card table in his home, the company soon had so much stock that they had to rent space in more than 30 separate garages.

=== Post-war ===
The business continued in the post-war era and owned so much stock that when the Korean War started the military came to him for the optics needed to repair war-era systems. One official told him, "Gee, you have more optics than the Army!" In 1948 they completed a new building and warehouse in Barrington and opened a retail store at the front. Among its displays was a complete periscope from a WWII Japanese submarine. The core of the company in this era remained surplus lenses. These were single-element lenses, shipped in 2.5-by-4.25-inch (64 mm × 108 mm) coin envelopes, with the approximate diameter and focal length stenciled on them. Reflecting their salvage and surplus origins, available diameters and focal lengths did not fall into regular progressions.

In addition to optics, the company soon branched out into various kits and plans for optics-related systems like telescopes and microscopes. It soon changed its name to Edmund Scientific and made its name with ads in publications like Scientific American. Its advertisements caught the attention of hobbyists, amateur astronomers, high school students, and cash-strapped researchers. The company also began publishing a series of pamphlets on telescopes in a do-it-yourself fashion that was popular in contemporary magazines like Popular Mechanics. These were later collected into book form in 1967, "All About Telescopes", which contained many plans for telescope systems that became a best seller and was republished repeatedly into the 1980s.

=== Heyday ===
Edmund Scientific's surplus room, in the back of their retail store in Barrington, New Jersey in the mid-1970s, carried many items not listed in the catalogs.

Following Sputnik, Edmund was able to capitalize on a growing national interest in science and astronomy. They expanded their business into a full line of telescopes and telescope kits as well as equipment, parts, and supplies for other scientific fields such as physics, optics, chemistry, microscopy, electronics, and meteorology. They continued to grow as a supplier to teachers and schools with demonstration devices and kits which covered most fields of science.

Edmund's catered to the 1960s generation by expanding and highlighting their line of projectors, color wheels, black lights, filters, and other optical devices which could be used by rock bands and in psychedelic light shows. Other items catering to the counterculture were eventually added to the catalog covering the fields of Biofeedback, ESP, Kirlian photography, Pyramid power, and alternative energy.

In 1971, in the Whole Earth Catalog of items "relevant to independent education", Stewart Brand noted:

"Edmund is the best source we know of for low-cost scientific gadgetry (including math and optics gear). [In this category,] many of the items we found independently... turned up in the Edmund catalog, so we were obliged to recommend that in this area we've been precluded."

The company became briefly famous in 1973 when Comet Kohoutek approached Earth and the company sold out of telescopes, a fact that made national news. Neil deGrasse Tyson would later comment that "The Edmund Scientific catalog was a geek's paradise. At a time when no one had access to lasers, they had them for sale."

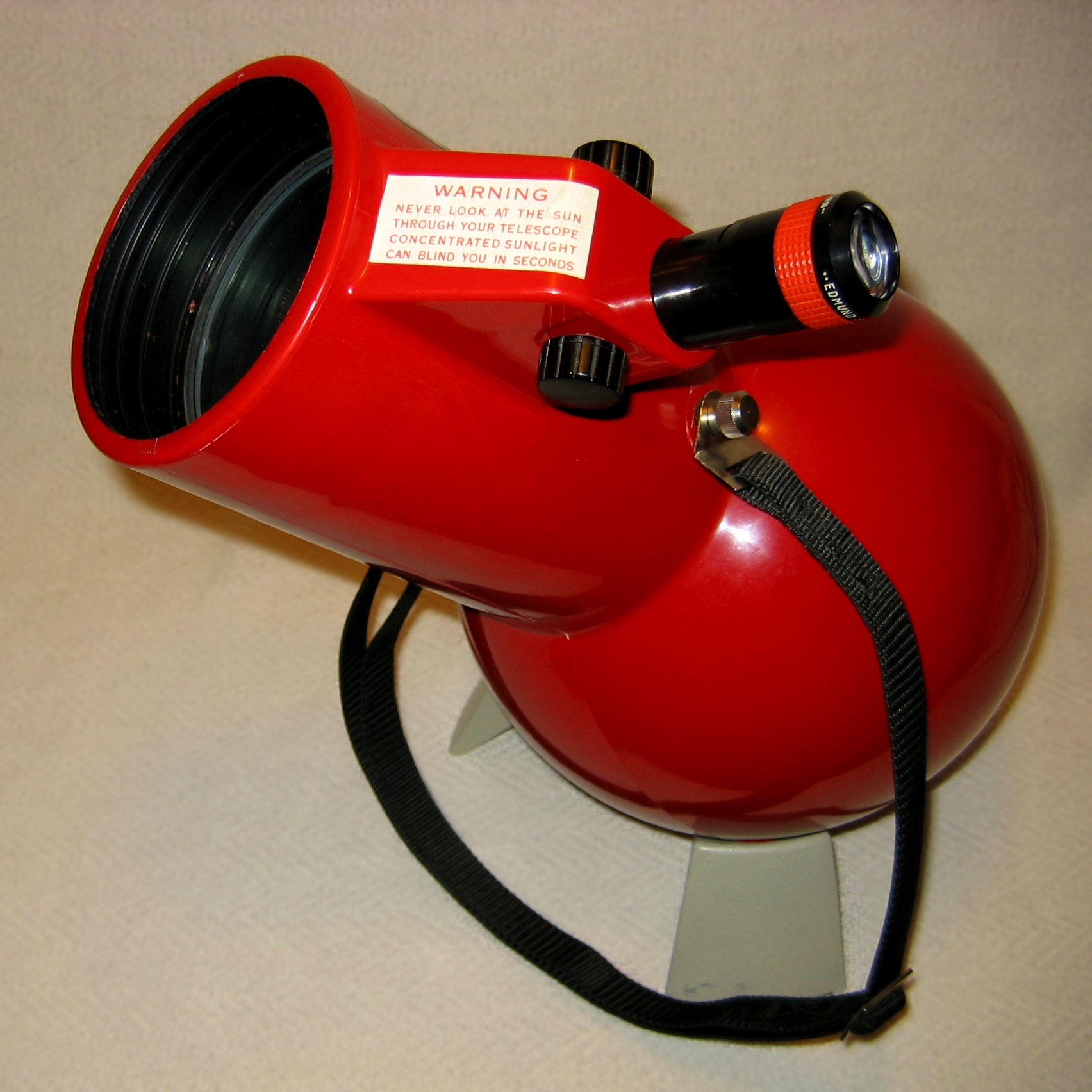
Edmund Scientific developed their own telescope product lines, including the Astroscan, a simple to use portable Newtonian reflector

Some sources claim that certain of the original polyhedral dice used in the Dungeons & Dragons role-playing game system were obtained from Edmund Scientific.

The large back room of Edmund Scientific's retail store sold military surplus from World War II and other wars well into the 1980s and into the mid-1990s. Some of the items in the surplus room were from German and other non-American militaries. None of these items were in the mail-order catalogs. They also sold other surplus wares of interest to hobbyists, including specialized motors and other miscellaneous electronics, parts from toys, household items, and damaged catalog items and reject parts.

Norman W. Edmund retired in 1975 and left the company to his son, Robert. The company continued on as before into the 1980s, but the original business model began to wane. In 1984 Robert split the company into Edmund Scientific and Edmund Industrial Optics, a business to business company selling of high-tech industrial optics.

=== Closing ===
As part of the focus on industrial optics the factory store was closed in 2001 and the catalog based "Scientifics" part of the company (consumer educational science-themed toys and devices) was sold off to Science Kit and Boreal Laboratories, a Tonawanda, New York based science supply company. Under the domain name of scientificsonline their Scientifics Direct website sold the same variety of science-themed toys, vaguely high-tech household gadgets, "science gifts", microscopes (mostly Boreal brand, manufactured for their parent company Science Kit LLC), surplus optics, magnets, and Fresnel lenses. They also featured new items such as a table top dobsonian telescope sold under the old Astroscan label, the Impossiball and hand boilers. A posting on their web site in early 2025 indicated "we are no longer selling products on this website" and neither the website nor the toll-free number were operational past March, 2025.

== Edmund Optics ==
Edmund Industrial Optics, renamed Edmund Optics in 2001 continues to operate at the same location. It is a business to business operation and therefor does not have a public storefront. Their facility also includes their fulfillment operation which they retained after the closing of Edmund Scientific. They offer brand-new stock optics, as well as offering custom and specialized optics to corporations and higher education institutions. For a while they offered a variety of experimental grade and stock clearance items via a print catalog and online under a separate business named Anchor Optics, but this operation ceased in 2016.

== In popular culture ==
Edmund Scientific has provided items used in television shows such as House, MythBusters, 24, Modern Marvels, and motion pictures such as Star Trek, and the 1975 version of Escape to Witch Mountain. Wah Chang, the artist who designed and built several props in the 1960s for the Star Trek television show, used moiré patterns found in the Edmund Scientific Educator's and Designer's Moiré Kit for the texture used in the Starfleet communicator props.

In the Simpsons episode "Two Bad Neighbors", Bart Simpson releases locusts from a box labeled Edmund Scientific.

== See also ==
- Astroscan, a wide-field Newtonian reflector telescope produced by the Edmund Scientific Corporation.

== Bibliography ==
- Preface to Edmund Scientific Catalog 751 Copyright 1974, Edmund Scientific Co.
- Miller, Stephen (24 January 2012). "He Supplied the Gadgets to Scientists of All Ages". The Wall Street Journal.
