= Annals of Improbable Research =

Humorous academic journal

- Discipline: Science humor
- Language: English
- Edited by: Marc Abrahams

Publication details
- History: 1994 to present
- Publisher: Improbable Research, Inc. (United States)
- Frequency: Bimonthly
- Impact factor: N/A

Standard abbreviations
- ISO 4: Ann. Improbable Res.

Indexing
- ISSN: 1079-5146

Links
- Journal homepage

The Annals of Improbable Research (AIR) is a bimonthly magazine devoted to scientific humor, in the form of a satirical take on the standard academic journal. AIR, published six times a year since 1995, usually showcases at least one piece of scientific research being done on a strange or unexpected topic, but most of their articles concern real or fictional absurd experiments, such as a comparison of apples and oranges using infrared spectroscopy. Other features include such things as ratings of the cafeterias at scientific institutes, fake classifieds and advertisements for a medical plan called HMO-NO, and a very odd letters page. The magazine is headquartered in Cambridge, Massachusetts.

AIR awards the annual science Ig Nobel Prizes, for ten achievements that "first make people laugh, and then make them think". AIR also runs the Luxuriant Flowing Hair Club for Scientists.

== History ==
AIR is not the first science parody magazine. The Journal of Irreproducible Results (JIR) was founded by Alex Kohn and Harry J. Lipkin in 1955, but its editorial staff, including editor Marc Abrahams, left after the magazine was bought by publisher George Scherr in 1994. Scherr filed a number of court actions against AIR, alleging that it was deceptively similar to the Journal and that it had stolen the name "Ig Nobel Prize", but these actions were unsuccessful.

== Profile ==
Occasional AIR articles are factual and illuminating, if a bit offbeat. For example, in 2003 researcher-documentary producer Nick T. Spark wrote about the background and history of Murphy's Law in a four-part article, "Why Everything You know About Murphy's Law is Wrong". It was revised, expanded and later published in June 2006 as the book A History of Murphy's Law. Another example: it was scientifically proved and waggishly reported that instruments can "distinguish shit from Shinola."

== See also ==
- Journal of Irreproducible Results
- Journal of Polymorphous Perversity
- Worm Runner's Digest
