= Alberta Union of Provincial Employees =

Canadian trade union

Alberta Union of Provincial Employees (AUPE)
- Founded: 1977
- Headquarters: Edmonton, Alberta, Canada
- Location: Canada
- Members: 95,000
- Key people: Sandra Azocar (President); Justin Huseby (Executive Secretary-Treasurer)
- Website: www.aupe.org

The Alberta Union of Provincial Employees (AUPE) is a Canadian trade union operating solely in the province of Alberta. With approximately 100,000 members as of March 2025, it is Alberta's largest union. AUPE is a union with members employed in government, health care, education, boards and agencies, municipalities, and private companies.

As of 2025, AUPE has 33 locals and administers more than 150 separate collective agreements. Notable employers of AUPE members include the Government of Alberta, Alberta Health Services, Covenant Health, University of Calgary, Northern and Southern Alberta Institutes of Technology, Edmonton Catholic Schools, and ATB Financial.

As of 2014, the union had a staff of more than 100 employees at its headquarters in Edmonton and seven regional offices across Alberta, including Peace River, Grande Prairie, Athabasca, Camrose, Red Deer, Calgary and Lethbridge.

AUPE has its origins in the Civil Service Association of Alberta, founded in 1919 to represent "civil servants," as direct employees of the Alberta government were then known. It became a legal union with the power to bargain collectively in 1977. AUPE remains active in the union movement and in provincial issues in Alberta. In the fall of 2007, it undertook a major campaign to press for changes in Alberta's labour laws, which ban strikes by most AUPE members. Despite those bans, AUPE members have taken illegal strike action on several occasions to press their demands for collective agreements.

== Membership ==
The vast majority of AUPE's members come under one of two pieces of legislation, the Alberta Labour Relations Code and the Public Service Employees Relations Act. One small unit comes under federal Canadian labour legislation.

AUPE categorizes its membership into four sectors for administrative purposes:

- Government services: direct employees of the Government of Alberta, with approximately 25,000 members.
- Health care: employees of health care providers, including Alberta Health Services, as well as other public, private and not-for-profit facilities, over 55,000 members.
- Education: non-academic employees of universities, community colleges, technical institutes and school boards, more than 11,000 members.
- Boards, agencies, and local government: employees of quasi-independent boards set up by the government of Alberta, government agencies, and municipal governments, as well as ATB Financial (a wholly owned provincial crown corporation) and Alberta Terminals Ltd., a private grain-handling company and division of Cargill that was formerly a government agency. Altogether this sector includes more than 4,000 members.

AUPE members pay union dues of 1.25% of their base pay. Members do not pay dues on shift or weekend differential pay, or on overtime pay.

=== Change over time ===
In the mid-1990s, AUPE saw its membership fall due to the privatization of some government-run services during the provincial leadership of Premier Ralph Klein. Membership fell to about 35,000 in 1995. However, under the leadership of Dan MacLennan, a Calgary jail guard who was elected in 1997, AUPE rebuilt itself and saw its membership surpass 60,000. MacLennan's efforts were aided by increasing moderation in the policies of the Klein government in the years after the cuts of the mid-1990s, as well as by rapid economic and population growth in the province of Alberta.

Doug Knight was elected president in a by-election in 2006 after MacLennan left the union to pursue a career in the private sector. Dramatic growth continued under Knight, with membership reaching 67,000 in June 2007.

Guy Smith was president of AUPE from October 2009 until 2025.

== Affiliation ==
AUPE was a component part of the National Union of Public and General Employees until 2001, when it was suspended by that organization in a dispute over an organizing campaign involving members of another union. At its annual convention in 2006, delegates voted to formally disaffiliate AUPE from NUPGE, and by association the Canadian Labour Congress and the Alberta Federation of Labour.

== History ==
=== The Civil Service Association of Alberta ===
AUPE began life on March 26, 1919, when a small group of Alberta government employees held a founding meeting in north Edmonton's First Presbyterian Church. They agreed to incorporate the Civil Service Association of Alberta (CSA), and elected Judson Lambe as their first president. They adopted a crest that declared: "Unity Strength Protection."

The CSA held its first annual convention in February 1921 at a total cost of $202.65. Eighteen delegates and 11 Provincial Executive members attended. They chose a Public Works employee, W.T. Aiken, as their new president. And, despite the attitudes of some politicians, civil servants were in those days highly respected and valued in society.

From the start, the CSA's leaders made progress. In response to their concerns about patronage, the government appointed a Civil Service Commissioner in 1923. They bargained pay and working conditions through an advisory joint council established by the United Farmers of Alberta government that same year.

CSA historical milestones include: Pensions in 1923. Group life insurance in 1934. Dues check-off in 1947. Mileage rates in 1948. A 40-hour week in 1955. Four weeks' vacation after 24 years in 1956. A classification appeal procedure in 1957. The first CSA agreement with a board in 1958 — for Branch 23 at the University of Alberta Hospital. Medical premiums half covered by the employer in 1967. New legislation that recognized the CSA as sole bargaining agent for employees of the Crown, as well as certain boards and agencies, in 1968.

=== The Creation of AUPE ===
While the CSA had grown enormously in size and vitality by the late 1970s, surpassing 30,000 members, its leaders recognized the need for legal recognition as a full-fledged union.

In the spring of 1974, 300 members in Department of Health & Social Development demonstrated against an arbitrary change in statutory holiday entitlements. The government backed down. That same season, employees of the Alberta Liquor Control Board went on strike for 10 days, winning substantial wage increases.

This unrest culminated on October 1, 1974, when 12,500 direct government employees walked off the job for two days because the government had arbitrarily imposed a pay increase six days before bargaining was due to commence. They won their point again, and the government agreed to negotiate in good faith.

On June 14, 1976, the Legislature repealed the Civil Service Association of Alberta Act, and the Alberta Union of Provincial Employees was legally born. On the day of its formation, AUPE boasted a budget of $3.4 million. T.W. (Bill) Broad, the last president of the CSA, was chosen as the first president of the new union at its founding convention held November 18–20, 1976, at the Chateau Lacombe Hotel in Edmonton.

Convention decisions, however, still had to be approved by government, as the union operated under the Societies Act. This changed on November 17, 1977, when AUPE met to change its status into an unincorporated trade union. All aspects of the CSA were transferred into the new union. The Public Service Employee Relations Act (PSERA) received Royal Assent on May 18, 1977, giving AUPE bargaining rights for each group of employees for which it had a collective agreement. These arrangements were ratified at the union's second convention at the Palliser Hotel in Calgary.

However, PSERA had been passed over the objections of AUPE and other unions, who remembered Alberta Premier Peter Lougheed's 1971 pre-election promises of full bargaining rights for public employees. Instead, Lougheed's government passed the most restrictive labour legislation in Canada, which included compulsory arbitration designed to favour employers.

=== AUPE's first decade ===
AUPE's inception took place in 1976, the same year that Canadian Prime Minister Pierre Elliot Trudeau announced wage and price controls with an Anti-Inflation Board, making it illegal for employers to negotiate pay increases above a certain guideline.

AUPE worked on consolidating its strength under the leadership of John Booth, who took over the presidency in 1977. Under Booth, AUPE built a reputation as a union willing to openly contest the government of Alberta.

At the 1979 Convention, Booth asked delegates to make 1980 a "test year" for negotiations. AUPE then took on the government with its "Apples & Oranges Campaign," a reference to claim by government members that comparing 47-per-cent pay raises for MLAs with single-digit pay raises for public employees was like comparing apples and oranges.

Unsuccessful negotiations were followed by strike action, and more than 3,000 AUPE members hit the bricks in the summer of 1980 — fully aware that their action was illegal. AUPE won that strike, effectively challenging existing arbitration rules and the ban on strikes. By AUPE's fifth annual convention in October 1980, membership stood at over 41,000 — half of them women.

In 1982, AUPE moved into its new headquarters on 170 Street in Edmonton and established regional offices throughout the province. When the government tried to impose on arbitrators a ceiling of eight percent on annual pay increases, AUPE launched a campaign called "The Apple Rides Again" — forcefully reminding the government of what had happened in 1980. With the threat of conflict in the air, AUPE won major gains at arbitration, far in excess of the premier's "Eight Per Cent Solution."

Hard times hit Alberta in 1983 and the government began to cut jobs. AUPE's membership had touched 52,500, but by 1984 had dipped to 47,500. The Union responded with aggressive organizing in municipal government and the health care sector.

Patricia (Pat) Wocknitz was elected president at the beginning of this difficult period. One of her first acts was to call a special constitutional convention in 1985 to reduce the Provincial Executive to 28 members. The government began to step up privatization and AUPE's membership shrank that year to 46,000.

=== The Dark Decade — 1987 to 1996 ===
The years 1987 to 1996 were a challenging decade for AUPE — with layoffs and privatization taking place under the provincial government led by Premier Ralph Klein.

In 1987, Wocknitz met with Lougheed's replacement, Premier Don Getty, to negotiate an early retirement incentive program that would combine voluntary job sharing, voluntary extended leave, and re-employment counseling. That year, AUPE filed more than 1,000 grievances, setting the tone for the period.

AUPE organized aggressively to make up for membership losses in the government, but bargaining became harder than ever and gains were marginal. As cutbacks continued through 1988, membership dipped further and revenues sagged.

By 1989, privatization and deregulation were in full swing and the government was floating trial balloons about privatization of some of its most important human services. Membership continued to decline, mainly through cuts to the government service, and AUPE faced substantial debt, reduced revenues and crippling building costs.

When bargaining stalled in 1990 and government pressed ahead with its divestment of people services, social workers in Local 006 led a 22-day strike over workload and staffing. Subsequently, correctional officers in Local 003 held a seven-day strike over pensions and early retirement, which they won. General support services employees in Local 054 also held a one-day strike at the University of Alberta Hospital.

For its members, AUPE existed as a defender of public services. In 1992, however, the union found itself in the midst of a Progressive Conservative leadership campaign alive with promises of further privatization and downsizing. Negotiations that year yielded an average pay increase of two per cent.

Public sentiment at the time was that public debt was a major problem, leading many Albertans to accept financial cuts in public sector compensation. The result came under the planning of Premier Ralph Klein, along with Vermilion veterinarian and MLA Stephen West, a provincial cabinet minister. Funding for government services was cut 20 per cent across the board.

AUPE lost more than 3,000 more members in one year, many in the U.S.-style privatization of liquor stores. In addition, many members were reorganized into boards and agencies, requiring a restructuring of the union. And more than 8,500 hospital workers faced regionalization, whereby health agencies had responsibility over their individual regions, while budgeting was still centrally planned at the provincial level.

In the spring of 1993, Foothills Hospital workers in Calgary accepted a "small temporary rollback" to keep laundry, dietary and housekeeping jobs in-house in return for 15 months of job security. In total, 4,700 jobs were lost between August 1990 and August 1993.

When Carol Ann Dean was elected president in 1992, AUPE's reserve fund had been used up. Secretary-Treasurer Ed Mardell, who was elected at the same convention and would serve until 2004, imposed an austerity program. Nevertheless, by mid-January, AUPE was over $1 million in the hole.

Facing a deteriorating financial situation, AUPE's Executive called a special convention in July 1994 to seek a temporary dues increase to 1.5 percent. The resolution was defeated by a single vote and the 1994 convention had to be postponed. Privatization by the government continued in many departments, although AUPE succeeded in fighting off a plan to privatize provincial jails.

The government took advantage of AUPE's weakened condition, opening bargaining in 1994 by announcing across-the-board cutbacks of five percent in the government service, plus boards and agencies that depended on government for funding. After an extended campaign, AUPE ratified agreements containing cutbacks in the order of 2.3 percent, with the remainder taken in days off and holidays.

Membership continued to fall dramatically — to about 35,000 in 1995. Government service sector membership fell from more than 32,000 in 1992 to just 18,000 in March 1998. AUPE came very close to bankruptcy. However, with assistance from affiliated unions, the union was able meet its staff payroll and keep up a robust campaign against the government's agenda.

In 1996, AUPE's fightback began to bear fruit. In late 1995, laundry workers at Foothills Hospital in Calgary went on a week-long wildcat strike to protest the Calgary Health Region's decision to contract out laundry services to Edmonton-based K-Bro. With massive support from other AUPE locals, unions and the Calgary public, the workers forced Premier Klein to make a concession.

Soon after, Edmonton's Capital Health Authority backed off on plans to contract out many of its services. As well, while some cuts continued, the government soon backed down on other privatization moves.

=== AUPE's Recovery — 1997 to 2006 ===
The years 1997 to 2006 saw the rebuilding of AUPE. While membership continued to decline for the first couple of years of the decade, the basic conditions were finally reversed. A booming economy with an emerging labour shortage provided a much better climate for organizing and bargaining. AUPE flexed its collective muscles in illegal but effective job actions, and began to pick up unprecedented numbers of new members through mergers and organizing.

The period began with the election of Dan MacLennan as AUPE president. Under MacLennan's leadership, AUPE began to turn the corner on bargaining and reaped the benefits of a reputation for standing up for its members. MacLennan emphasized media savvy, and AUPE became effective as a force for social and legislative change in Alberta.

In 1997, AUPE made up for previous rollbacks, concluding 79 agreements covering 30,000 members. In March 1998, members at the University of Alberta Hospital and Glenrose Hospital in Edmonton walked off the job for six hours — enough to win a settlement. In early 2000, Edmonton's auxiliary nursing care employees went on strike for two days and won a significant settlement. Other successes followed, and even though AUPE faced fines and dues suspensions for its actions in defense of its members, its financial situation began to improve.

In 1999, AUPE had merged with the Canadian Health Care Guild, bringing another 7,000 members into the fold.

A "window of opportunity" opened wider in 2000 when the province predicted a sixth consecutive multibillion-dollar budget surplus. And in 2001, AUPE established the high-water mark for bargaining for all unions in Alberta. This included contracts for about 14,000 health care employees. Membership that year grew past 45,000 and the union began to rebuild its defense fund. By the 26th annual convention in 2002, membership was approaching 50,000 and AUPE was bargaining for over 19,000 health care employees.

However some of this growth came at a political cost. AUPE, under the direction of MacLennan, engaged in the practice of raiding; essentially trying to court workplaces unionized with another union to switch their affiliation. This practice is looked down upon by many unions, notably the Canadian Labour Congress and its affiliates, as a practice that creates a race to the bottom and pits unions and workers against each other, and spending scarce organizing resources on already-unionized workplaces, rather than organizing non-union workers. Proponents of raiding might argue that if a group of workers believe that their union is not working for them, they ought to have the democratic choice to switch to a union that they feel would better represent them.

In 2001, AUPE successfully raided two long-term care homes, one in Edmonton, and the other in Grande Prairie, taking the units from the Canadian Union of Public Employees (CUPE). The Canadian Labour Congress and its provincial affiliate, the Alberta Federation of Labour, decried this action. This led to a suspension of AUPE from NUPGE, the national union of which it was a component. In protest, AUPE withheld its dues that were to be sent to the CLC. AUPE and MacLennan received unlikely support from Premier Ralph Klein, a friend of MacLennan's despite their divergent interests, with Klein saying: "I think that he understands the rights of workers to belong to a union, but moreover to belong to the union of their choice." In 2006, AUPE delegates voted to formally disaffiliate from NUPGE and the CLC/AFL, thus becoming an independent union.

In March 2003, AUPE faced what seemed to be another setback when the Alberta government introduced Bill 27, the Labour Relations (Regional Health Authorities Restructuring) Amendment Act, which forced amalgamation of health region bargaining units. AUPE officers and staff were mobilized to handle "run-off votes" in a number of regions, and, when the dust had settled, AUPE won them all, adding approximately 7,000 new members. By the 28th annual convention in 2004, total membership was over 58,000. AUPE was in good shape as it prepared to bargain that year at more than 30 tables for over 40,000 members. By the end of 2005, AUPE's membership surpassed 62,000.

MacLennan resigned in 2006 to pursue a new career in the private sector. He was replaced by Doug Knight, who was elected in a by-election at the October 2006 AUPE annual convention. Knight had worked as a government of Alberta land-management specialist based in Red Deer and was a member of AUPE Local 005, which represents the Alberta government's natural resources employees. He had joined AUPE in 1989, when he began working for the Government. Prior to his election as president, he served as Local 005's representative on the union's Provincial Executive.

=== 2007 Change the Law Campaign ===
In 2007, under Knight's leadership, AUPE formally launched a major campaign to change Alberta's labour laws.

AUPE argued that the province's current labour laws – as they affected private-sector employees, public employees and employees not represented by unions – were out-of-date, unfair and inconsistent with international accords on the rights of working people, including declarations signed by the government of Canada.

AUPE asked Alberta residents to sign letters to their Members of the Legislative Assembly stating that they wanted the Legislature to pass new laws that would guarantee the rights of all working people to fair and full collective bargaining.

The campaign called for five significant changes to the province's labour laws:

1. A single, consistent labour law for all unionized employees in the province, including public sector employees.
2. Full and fair bargaining rights for all public employees, including the right to strike as guaranteed by international declarations on the rights of working people.
3. First-contract binding arbitration to help newly unionized workplaces get a first collective agreement.
4. Automatic union certification when more than half the employees in a workplace have signed a union card.
5. A ban on the use of strikebreakers during labour disputes.

The campaign came at a time of major activity in the Alberta economy that led to similar calls for reform from other unions and labour organizations. As a result, AUPE received broad support for its campaign objectives from other groups, including some that have disagreed with AUPE on other issues.

=== 2013 Wildcat Strike ===
On Friday April 26, 2013, Correctional Peace Officers across Alberta walked off the job or actively refused to enter Correctional Centers in solidarity to the wildcat strike started at the Edmonton Remand Centre. The initial event that started the strike is cited by the AUPE as the indefinite suspension of two union members after they voiced concerns over health and safety issues at the Edmonton Remand Centre. However, emails to the site's Executive Director which contained crude and disrespectful comments were the driving force for the union members' suspension. The centre had only been in use for two weeks; it received its first inmates on April 12, 2013, even though the AUPE - which represents the Correctional Officers - submitted a five-page list of deficiencies on April 11, 2013.

By the morning of Saturday April 27, all 10 correctional centres in Alberta (in Calgary, Edmonton, Peace River, Medicine Hat, Lethbridge & Red Deer) were all actively participating in the wildcat strike. The Alberta Provincial Government petitioned the Alberta Labour Relations Board and, after the Board ruled that the strike was illegal, filed an Injunction against the Correctional Officers demanding they cease strike actions and return to work. The injunction was ignored and officers have continued striking throughout Saturday and Sunday. Support for the officers was apparently from as far as Saskatchewan as a bus full of Saskatchewan Correctional Officers arrived at the Edmonton Remand Centre on Sunday afternoon to march with the AUPE members in solidarity. Correctional Officer positions were filled using RCMP Officers and Tactical Team Members of local Police Services as available.

By Monday morning, the Edmonton area Alberta Sheriff Department had held a vote, which resulted in them joining the strike. Sheriffs were joined by Probation Officers, Social Workers and Court Clerks as they marched outside Courthouses located in Edmonton and Calgary. Security screening at the courthouses were left in the hands of local police, with contracted security called in to handle courtroom security. However, many of the cases were simply cancelled due to the staffing shortages.

Late Monday evening, Court of Queen's Bench Justice John Rooke found AUPE in contempt of court for the illegal strike, stating the union had not done enough to convince their members to return to work. A $100,000 fine was levied against the union, with the fine increasing in substantial increments until the strike ended.

- If it ended prior to noon on Tuesday April 30 - $100,000
- If it ended between noon on Tuesday and noon Wednesday - an additional $250,000
- If it did not end by noon on Wednesday - an additional $500,000

The fine would continue to rise at a rate of $500,000 per day until workers returned to their jobs.

Throughout the wildcat strike, the Minister of Justice and Solicitor General Jonathan Denis remained largely quiet, with most statements actually being issued by the Alberta Deputy Premier Thomas Lukaszuk. Deputy Premier Lukaszuk repeated throughout the strike that the province would not negotiate with the AUPE until the strike ended and staff returned to work. In the meantime, the province enacted a contingency plan that included enlisting RCMP officers from Alberta and out of province to work as temporary guards, a plan that cost the province roughly $1.2 million a day.

The wildcat strike ended after five days, with the government and AUPE agreeing to a new occupational health and safety review for the Edmonton Remand Centre, and no retribution for individual members involved in the wildcat strike.

== Organizational structure ==
AUPE's highest governing body is the union's annual convention. Each local is entitled to one voting delegate for every 100 members. At convention – normally held in late October in Edmonton – policies are established, budget and operating procedures determined and executive committee officers elected by a vote of delegates. Executive members serve a two-year term. Votes are normally held in odd-numbered years; by-elections are held when necessary.

In each odd-numbered year, convention delegates elect an eight-member executive committee made up of a president, an executive secretary-treasurer, and six vice-presidents. The president and secretary-treasurer serve as full-time officers of the union. Vice-presidents receive time off with pay as required to fulfill their duties. The president acts as the union's chief executive officer, the secretary-treasurer as its chief financial officer. Vice-presidents are assigned responsibilities by the president.

AUPE's Provincial Executive is made up of the members of the executive committee plus one elected delegate from each of the union's 33 locals. It is the union's governing body between conventions. The PE meets at least six times a year to conduct the union's business.

In 2014, AUPE has 13 permanent committees:

- Legislative Committee, which advises on the constitution and policies of AUPE.
- Membership Services Committee, which considers matters relating to the delivery of services to AUPE members.
- Finance Committee, which advises on the administration and finances of AUPE, and ensures proper records are kept.
- Committee on Political Action, known as COPA, which promotes education and social action by members on matters of political concern.
- Occupational Health and Safety Committee, which promotes occupational health and safety among members.
- Anti-Privatization Committee, which promotes education of members and the public on matters of privatization and contracting out.
- Women's Committee, which promotes education of members and the public on issues of equality and discrimination as they pertain to women.
- Pension Committee, which concerns itself with issues pertaining to members' pensions.
- Members' Benefits Committee, which reviews applications for financial assistance from AUPE members.
- Pay and Social Equity Committee, which educates members on and lobbies for pay equity.
- Young Activists Committee, which aims to help young people become empowered in their working lives.
- Human Rights Committee, which educates, promotes awareness and encourages action among members and the public related to equality, discrimination and related issues.
- Environmental Committee, which educates members about issues of environmental concern.

=== Presidents of AUPE ===
- William "Bill" Broad (Last President of the CSA of A) — 1977
- John Booth — 1978–1987
- Patricia Woknitz — 1987–1993
- Carol Ann Dean — 1993–1997
- Dan MacLennan — 1997–2006
- Doug Knight — 2006–2009
- Guy Smith - 2009–2025
- Sandra Azocar - 2025-Present

=== Current Executive ===
The current executive was selected by majority vote by delegates at the 2025 Annual AUPE Convention, held in Edmonton, October 23–25, 2025.

- President: Sandra Azocar
- Executive Secretary-Treasurer: Justin Huseby
- Vice-president: Bobby-Joe Borodey
- Vice-president: Shamanthi Cooray
- Vice-president: James Gault
- Vice-president: Darren Graham
- Vice-president: Curtis Jackson
- Vice-president: Andrew Wilson
