= Alberta Federation of Labour =

Trade union federation in the Canadian province of Alberta

- Abbreviation: AFL
- Formation: 1912
- Type: Trade union centre
- Headquarters: Edmonton, Alberta, Canada
- Location: Alberta, Canada
- Members: 170,000 (2024)
- President: Gil McGowan
- Secretary-treasurer: Cori Longo
- Parent organization: Canadian Labour Congress
- Website: afl.org

The Alberta Federation of Labour (AFL) is the Alberta provincial trade union federation of the Canadian Labour Congress. It has a membership of approximately 170,000 from 26 affiliated unions.

The AFL was founded in 1912. Special prominence was given to delegates of the United Farmers of Alberta, in a show of worker-farmer solidarity. UFA leader William John Tregillus was on the AFL's first executive board, but soon the UFA voted not to affiliate with the labour union body, in part due to fear it would lose its independent existence. At the time, miners in the United Mine Workers of America (UMWA) and other working people in Lethbridge demanded the establishment of occupational health and safety regulations in Alberta's coal fields, which at the time had the highest workplace mortality rates in the world.

Calgary MLA Fred J. White, Lethbridge MLA Donald McNabb, Edmonton city councillor Alfred Farmilo and Edmonton mayor Elmer Roper were executive members of the AFL at various times.

The AFL's official newspaper, Alberta Labour News, was published from 1920 to 1936. It was edited by Edmonton union printer Elmer Roper (mayor of Edmonton 1960-1963), assisted by William Irvine (MP 1921-1925). The People's Weekly replaced the ALN in 1936 and continued on to 1944, when it became the organ of the Alberta CCF (and continued to be published until 1952).

AFL staffperson Lucien Royer was a co-founder of Save Tomorrow, Stop Pollution, which in the 1960s and 1970s fought against corporate pollution and against the proposal to build a freeway through picturesque Mill Creek Ravine. The AFL suffered the separation of building trades in 1982 in tandem with changes at the national level and the formation of the Canadian Federation of Labour. The AFL launched a "Change the Law" campaign for reform of Alberta's labour laws in 1986 and assisted in the 1986 Gainers strike.

On April 9, 2013, the AFL obtained a list of all employers who had been granted the ability to hire guest workers under the high-skilled section of the Temporary Foreign Worker program. The list of more than 2,400 employers included hundreds of fast food restaurants.

In August 2014, the Alberta Federation of Labour was fined $50,000 by the Canadian Radio-television and Telecommunications Commission for violating rules with 2012 provincial election robocalls.

On May 29, 2026 the AFL was the main force behind a province-wide protest against actions taken by the Alberta UCP government such as moves to privatize healthcare, its use of the notwithstanding clause to stop a strike by Alberta teachers, and its apparent willingness to open the door to separation from Canada.

Today, the federation continues its tradition of advocacy on issues it perceives to be of concern to working people. Often these issues relate directly to the workplace, but sometimes they relate to broader social issues such as education, pensions, energy policy and public health care.
