= List of Athabasca University people =

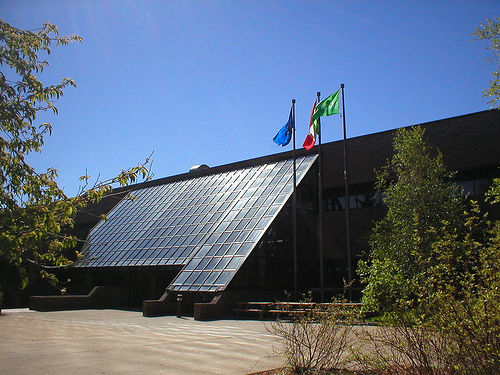
Front entrance of the university

This is a list of people associated with Athabasca University in Alberta, Canada. This includes faculty, notable alumni, staff, and former university presidents. Athabasca University is a distance education university with open enrollment year round, accredited by the province and the Middle States Association of Colleges and Schools. It has served more than 260,000 students since 1970. In 2007 it began offering some classes by phone, and in 2008 it became the first university in North America to offer a doctorate in distance education. In 2009, it became the first Canadian university to offer a doctorate in Business Administration (DBA).

The university teaches approximately 32,000 students per year, and has a variety of students with various learning needs. Classes are attended at the location of the student's choosing. The university has a set number of standards for students in the delivery of its programs. It offers over 700 courses, and spends $2 million a year on research.

== List ==
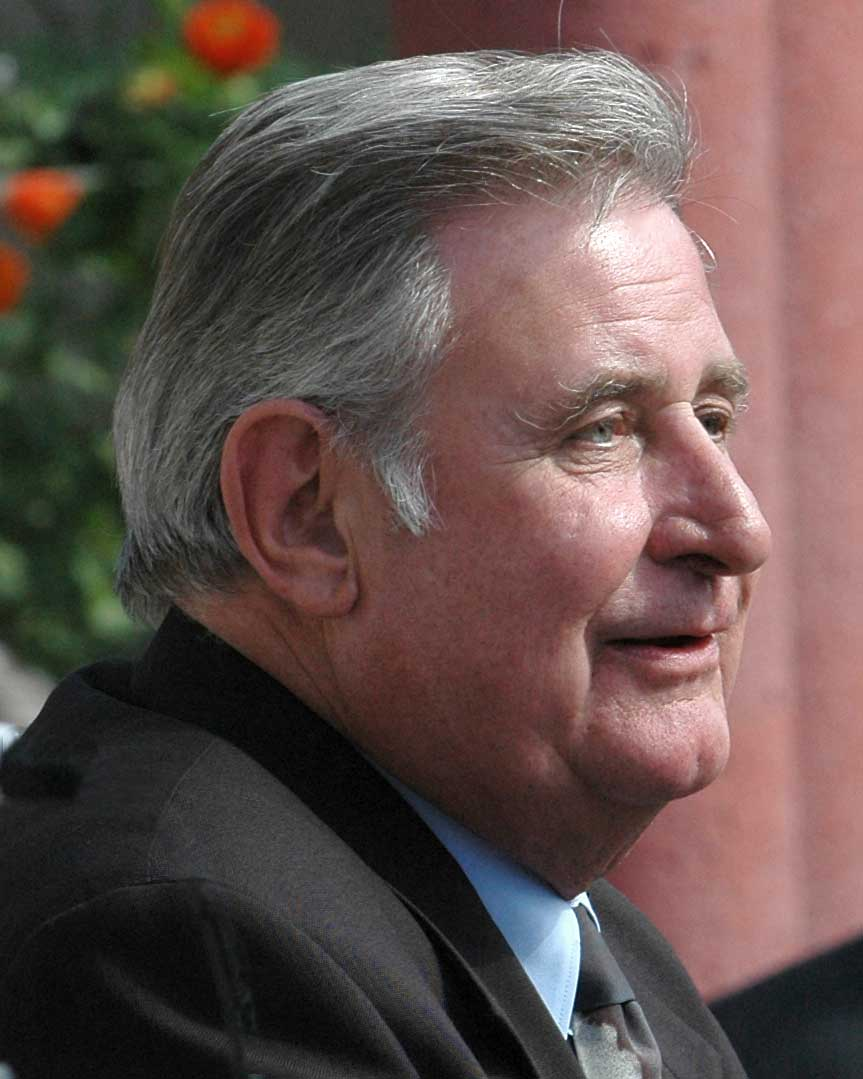
Ralph Klein, student

Name	Known for	Relationship to Athabasca University	Citation
Shannon-Ogbnai Abeda	Olympic athlete	Student	
Frank Appleby	Alberta MLA	Graduate and honorary degree	
Mark Arendz	Paralympic athlete	Graduate	
Pierre Berton	Author and journalist	Honorary degree	
Paul Boutilier	NHL veteran, New York Islanders	Student	
Debby Carlson	Alberta MLA for Edmonton Ellerslie	Graduate	
Gary Carr	Member of Parliament for Halton; NHL veteran, Boston Bruins	Graduate	
Larry Clarke	Businessman	Honorary degree	
Deidra Dionne	Olympic bronze medalist in aerial ski jumping	Student	
Meagan Duhamel	Olympic athlete	Graduate	
Rocky Dwyer	Business scholar	Former professor	
Christian Farstad	Former Olympic athlete, bobsleigh	Graduate	
Jonathan Filewich	Hockey player, Pittsburgh Penguins	Student	
Northrop Frye	Author	Honorary degree	
Vicki Gabereau	Journalist	Honorary degree	
Jayne Gackenbach	Dream researcher	Professor	
Anna Greenwood-Lee	Anglican bishop	Graduate	
Stu Grimson	NHL veteran, Calgary Flames	Graduate	
Ted Harrison	Artist	Honorary degree	
Thomas Hickey	Hockey player	student	
Lois Hole	Former lieutenant governor of Alberta	Former Governing Council member	
Carol Huynh	Olympic athlete	Graduate	
Sandra Keith	Olympic biathlete	Student	
Russell Kennedy	Olympic athlete	Graduate	
Ralph Klein	Former premier of Alberta	Student	
Swede Knox	NHL veteran	Graduate	
Jackson Lafferty	Northwest Territories MLA for North Slave	Student	
Dorothy Livesay	Poet	Honorary degree	
Ernest Manning	Former premier of Alberta	Honorary degree	
Shirlee Matheson	Author	Graduate	
Alyn McCauley	NHL player, San Jose Sharks	Student	
Maureen McTeer	Wife of Joe Clark	Honorary degree	
Rachel Notley	Former premier of Alberta	Former professor	
Ryan O'Marra	Hockey player, Edmonton Oilers	Student	
Kaetlyn Osmond	Olympic athlete	Student	
Marni Panas	LGBT activist	Graduate	
Joseph Pivato	Literary critic	Professor	
Eric Radford	Olympic athlete	Graduate	
Joy Romero	Businesswoman	Chair, Governing Council	
Beckie Scott	Olympic gold medallist in cross-country skiing	Student	
James Shapiro	Islet transplant doctor, University of Alberta	Honorary degree	
Monte Solberg	Conservative member of Parliament for Medicine Hat	Student	
Milaine Thériault	Olympic competitor	Student	
Amber Thomas	Paralympic athlete	Graduate	
Walter Patrick Twinn	Senator and Chief of Sawridge First Nation	Honorary degree	
Ian Tyson	Musician	Honorary degree	
Eleanor Wachtel	Journalist	Honorary degree	
Pamela Wallin	Journalist	Honorary degree	
Anne Wheeler	Filmmaker	Honorary degree	
Tom Worthington	Australian computer programmer	Graduate	
Moses Znaimer	Media baron	Honorary degree	

== University presidents ==
#	Name	Term	Citation
1	Tim Byrne	1971–1976	
2	Sam Smith	1976–1980	
3	Stephen Griew	1980–1985	
4	Terry Morrison	1985–1995	
5	Dominique Abrioux	1995–2005	
6	Frits Pannekoek	2005–2014	
7	Peter MacKinnon (interim)	2014–2016	
8	Neil Fassina	2016–2021	
9	Peter Scott	2021–2023	
10	Alex Clark	2023–present	
