= Peter MacKinnon =

Canadian academic (born 1947)

R. Peter MacKinnon OC KC

Interim President of Dalhousie University
- In office 15 January 2019 – 15 January 2020
- Chancellor: Anne McLellan
- Preceded by: Richard Florizone
- Succeeded by: Deep Saini

Interim President of Athabasca University
- In office 1 July 2014 – 10 October 2016
- Preceded by: Frits Pannekoek
- Succeeded by: Neil Fassina

8th President of the University of Saskatchewan
- In office 1999 – 30 June 2012
- Chancellor: Peggy McKercher; W. Thomas Molloy; Vera Pezer
- Preceded by: George Ivany
- Succeeded by: Ilene Busch-Vishniac

Personal details
- Born: 1947 (age 78–79) Prince Edward Island
- Spouse: Janice MacKinnon
- Education: Dalhousie University; Queen's University; University of Saskatchewan
- Occupation: Academic administration
- Profession: Legal academic
- Awards: Order of Canada
- Website: www.dal.ca/dept/senior-administration/president.html

R. Peter MacKinnon, OC KC (born 1947) is a Canadian lawyer and legal academic. MacKinnon served as the president of the University of Saskatchewan from 1999 to 2012. On 1 July 2014, he was named as the interim president of Athabasca University.

On 15 January 2019, MacKinnon started serving as interim president of Dalhousie University upon the resignation of Richard Florizone and served until the announcement of the next president, Deep Saini.

== Biography ==
Born in Prince Edward Island, he received a BA from Dalhousie University, an LL.B from Queen's University and a LL.M from the University of Saskatchewan. He is a member of the Ontario Bar and Saskatchewan Bar. He was created a Queen's Counsel in 1990. He is married to Janice MacKinnon, a Canadian historian and former minister of finance for the province of Saskatchewan. They have two children, Alan and William.

In 1975, he joined the faculty of the University of Saskatchewan as an assistant professor of law. He became an associate professor in 1978 and a professor in 1983. He served as chair of the University of Saskatchewan Faculty Association from 1983 to 1984. From 1979 to 1981, he was the assistant dean of law and was the dean of law from 1988 to 1998. In 1999, he was appointed the eighth president of the University of Saskatchewan. On March 9, MacKinnon announced that he would be stepping down as president of the University of Saskatchewan, effective June 30, 2012. He is succeeded by Ilene Busch-Vishniac, former provost and vice-president (academic) at McMaster University.

From 2003 to 2005, he was the chairman of the Association of Universities and Colleges of Canada, the organization representing Canada's universities.

In 2006, it was reported that he was one of three "short list" candidates to be recommended to be appointed to the Supreme Court of Canada replacing the retired justice John C. Major.

In 2011, he was made an Officer of the Order of Canada "for his contributions to education and for his commitment to innovation and research excellence".

In 2012, the Board of Governors of the University of Saskatchewan renamed the College Building the Peter MacKinnon Building.

== Controversies ==
On May 8, 2025, Peter MacKinnon published an opinion story demanding that the University of Saskatchewan end its programs to encourage equity, diversity and inclusion, with the claim that this program is part of an 'ideological crusade' that 'disparages merit, distorts our history and rests on the proposition that a white majority population has perpetrated a wide and pervasive racist agenda against others.' In response, and without naming MacKinnon by name, University of Saskatchewan President Peter Stoicheff noted that MacKinnon's allegations were 'serious and misguided', and noted the institution's obligations under The Saskatchewan Human Rights Code to eliminate discrimination in recruitment. Further, Stoicheff noted the university's robust academic freedom protections under the University of Saskatchewan Faculty Association Collective agreement.

== Notes ==
Academic offices
| Preceded by George Ivany | President of the University of Saskatchewan; 1999–2012 | Succeeded by Ilene Busch-Vishniac |
| Preceded by Frits Pannekoek | President of Athabasca University (Interim); 2014–2016 | Succeeded by Neil Fassina |
| Preceded by Richard Florizone | President of Dalhousie University (Interim); 2019–2020 | Succeeded by Deep Saini |
