= George Ivany =

Canadian university president (born 1938)

J. W. George Ivany

7th President of the University of Saskatchewan
- In office 1989–1999
- Chancellor: E. K. Turner; Peggy McKercher
- Preceded by: Leo Kristjanson
- Succeeded by: Peter MacKinnon

Acting President of Simon Fraser University
- In office April 1, 1983 – August 31, 1983
- Chancellor: Paul T. Cote
- Preceded by: George Pedersen
- Succeeded by: William G. Saywell

Personal details
- Born: Jesse William George Ivany Grand Falls-Windsor, Newfoundland and Labrador, Canada

Academic background
- Education: Memorial University of Newfoundland; Teachers College, Columbia University; University of Alberta
- Thesis: A comparison of expository and hypothetical modes of teaching science (1966)
- Doctoral advisor

Academic work
- Discipline: Education
- Sub-discipline: Science education
- Institutions: University of Alberta; Columbia University; Memorial University of Newfoundland; Simon Fraser University; University of Saskatchewan

J. W. George Ivany (born May 26, 1938) was President of the University of Saskatchewan from 1989 to 1999.

== Biography ==
Born in Grand Falls-Windsor, Newfoundland and Labrador, he received a Bachelor of Science degree in chemistry and physics from Memorial University of Newfoundland in 1960, a Master of Arts degree in physics education from Teachers College, Columbia University in 1962, and a Ph.D. in 1965 from the University of Alberta.

After teaching at the University of Alberta, he joined Columbia University as an associate professor in 1968 and was department head in 1973. From 1974 to 1977, he was professor and dean of education at Memorial University of Newfoundland. From 1977 to 1984, he was professor and dean of education at Simon Fraser University. He was acting president in 1983 and vice president, academic, from 1984 to 1989.

From 1989 to 1999, he was the seventh President of the University of Saskatchewan. He is credited with helping to determine the University as the location of the Canadian Light Source synchrotron in a competition that included the University of Western Ontario.

In 1999, he was appointed to the board of directors of Cameco, by then CEO Bernard Michel, and until retiring in 2011.

He served as the chair of the board of governors, Okanagan University College, from 2001 to 2003.

Academic offices
Preceded by George Pedersen	President of Simon Fraser University acting April 1, 1983 – August 31, 1983	Succeeded by William G. Saywell
Preceded by Leo Kristjanson	President of the University of Saskatchewan; 1989–1999	Succeeded by Peter MacKinnon
