= International Council for Open and Distance Education =

Distance education institutions based in Norway

ICDE - International Council for Open and Distance Education
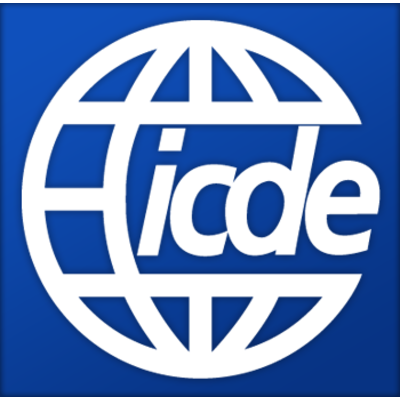
- Formation: August 1938
- Type: NGO
- Headquarters: Oslo, Norway
- Region served: Worldwide
- Members: 200 institutional members Universities, higher education institutions & associations.
- Official language: English
- President: Neil Fassina, President of Okanagan College, Canada
- Secretary General: Torunn Gjelsvik
- Affiliations: UNESCO, Commonwealth of Learning, IAU, Open Education Consortium
- Website: www.icde.org

The International Council for Open and Distance Education (ICDE) is a membership-led global organization in the field of online, open and technology enhanced education. It consists of more than 200 higher education institutions and organizations in some 84 countries.

Founded in 1938, the ICDE has its permanent secretariat in Oslo, Norway. It is currently partly funded by a grant from the Government of Norway and has been hosted in Oslo since 1988, where is a registered not-for-profit organization in Norway and operates under Norwegian law.

Since 1960, ICDE has a partnership with UNESCO.

== History ==
ICDE was founded in 1938 in Canada as the International Council for Correspondence Education (ICCE). The first World Conference was held in Victoria, British Columbia, Canada the same year. The idea for holding an international conference came from J. W. Gibson, director of high school correspondence instruction for the province of British Columbia, who attended the National Conference on Supervised Correspondence Study in New York in 1936. Gibson shared with other delegates knowledge he had about correspondence education in several countries and then suggested that an international conference be held. Rex Haight, then chair of the New York conference, supported the idea and later served as president for the first conference.

At the second conference, held in 1948, the delegates voted unanimously to establish a more permanent international council.

The third conference took place in 1953 in Christchurch, New Zealand, where a committee presented a proposed "Constitution and Rules" for the council that was adopted by the delegates. These rules helped the council became more established and conferences began to follow a more regular schedule.

In 1969, the 8th World Conference was held at UNESCO Headquarters in Paris to celebrate the affiliation with UNESCO.

In 1982, during the 12th World Conference held in Vancouver, the organization changed its name to "the International Council for Open and Distance Education" (ICDE).

In 1988, during the 14th ICDE World Conference held in Oslo, the King of Norway, King Olav V, and the Norwegian Prime Minister, Gro Harlem Brundtland, both attended. This conference led to the establishment of the permanent secretariat in Oslo.

Due to COVID-19 outbreak, in 2021 the conference organized its first-ever Global Virtual Conference Week in 2021.

== Membership ==
ICDE is a membership organization with 10 different types of memberships: Individuals, Students, Associations, Colleges and Universities, Companies, Educational networks, Governmental organizations, Non-Governmental organizations, Secondary Schools.

== World Conference ==
Since 2000, the ICDE World Conference has been organized biannually and on a different continent each time. The conference is traditionally organized at the invitation of an ICDE member.

| Session | Location | Year | Hosted by | from |
|---|---|---|---|---|
| 30th | Wellington | 2025 | Te Whanganui-a-Tara / Wellington | New Zealand |
| 29th | Natal | 2021 | The Federal University of Rio Grande do Norte – UFRN | Brazil |
| 28th | Dublin | 2019 | Dublin City University – DCU | Ireland |
| 27th | Toronto | 2017 | Contact North | Canada |
| 26th | Sun City | 2015 | The University of South Africa – UNISA | South Africa |
| 25th | Tianjin | 2013 | Tianjin Open University | China |
| 24th | Bali | 2011 | Indonesia Open University (Universitas Terbuka) | Indonesia |
| 23rd | Maastricht | 2009 | The Open University of the Netherlands | Netherlands |
| 22nd | Rio de Janeiro | 2006 | The Brazilian Distance Education Association – ABED | Brazil |
| 21st | Hong Kong | 2004 | The Open University of Hong Kong | Hong Kong |
| 20th | Düsseldorf | 2001 | FernUniversität | Germany |
| 19th | Hagen | 1999 | FernUniversität | Germany |
| 18th | State College | 1997 | Pennsylvania State University | United States |
| 17th | Milton Keynes | 1994 | The Open University UK | United Kingdom |
| 16th | Nonthaburi | 1992 | Sukhothai Thammathirat Open University | Thailand |
| 15th | Caracas | 1990 | Universidad Nacional Abierta | Venezuela |
| 14th | Oslo | 1988 | The Norwegian Association for Distance Education | Norway |
| 13th | Melbourne | 1985 | La Trobe University | Australia |
| 12th | Vancouver | 1982 | Athabasca University | Canada |
| 11th | New Delhi | 1978 | Punjabi University | India |
| 10th | Brighton | 1975 | Rapid Results College | United Kingdom |
| 9th | Warrenton | 1972 | | United States |
| 8th | Paris | 1969 | UNESCO Headquarters | France |
| 7th | Stockholm | 1965 | | Sweden |
| 6th | Gearhart | 1961 | | United States |
| 5th | Banff | 1958 | Banff School of Fine Arts | Canada |
| 4th | State College | 1953 | Penn State | United States |
| 3rd | Christchurch | 1950 | | New Zealand |
| 2nd | Lincoln | 1948 | The University of Nebraska | United States |
| 1st | Victoria | 1938 | The Department of Education for British Columbia | Canada |

== Presidents ==
The first 10 years of the council the presidency was led by Rex Haight in Canada who was also the chair of the first ICCE World Conference held in Victoria in 1938. Since 1948 the presidency of the council has been limited to a maximum of 5 years.

| Session | from | to | Name | Affiliation | from |
|---|---|---|---|---|---|
| 24th | 2023 | - | Mark Nichols | Open Polytechnic of New Zealand | New Zealand |
| 23rd | 2020 | 2023 | Neil Fassina | Okanagan College | Canada |
| 22nd | 2018 | 2020 | Belinda Tynan | RMIT University | Australia |
| 21st | 2015 | 2018 | Mandla Makhanya | The University of South Africa – UNISA | South Africa |
| 20th | 2012 | 2015 | Tian Belawati | Indonesia Open University (Universitas Terbuka) | Indonesia |
| 19th | 2008 | 2012 | Frits Pannekoek | Athabasca University | Canada |
| 18th | 2004 | 2008 | Helmut Hoyer | FernUniversität | Germany |
| 17th | 1999 | 2004 | Molly Corbett-Broad | University of North Carolina | United States |
| 16th | 1995 | 1999 | Armando Rocha-Trindade | Universidad Nacional Abierta | Venezuela |
| 15th | 1992 | 1995 | Marian Croft | Laurentian University | Canada |
| 14th | 1988 | 1992 | David Sewart | The Open University UK | United Kingdom |
| 13th | 1985 | 1988 | Kevin Smith | The University of New England | Australia |
| 12th | 1982 | 1985 | Sir John Daniel | Athabasca University | Canada |
| 11th | 1978 | 1982 | Bakhshish Singh | Punjabi University | India |
| 10th | 1975 | 1978 | David Young | Rapid Results College | United Kingdom |
| 9th | 1972 | 1975 | Börje Holmberg | Hermods Foundation | Sweden |
| 8th | 1969 | 1972 | Charles Wedemeyer | The Open University UK | United Kingdom |
| 7th | 1965 | 1969 | Rene Erdos | University of New South Wales | Australia |
| 6th | 1961 | 1965 | Donald Cameron | | |
| 5th | 1958 | 1961 | G.J. Buck | Banff School of Fine Arts | Canada |
| 4th | 1954 | 1958 | William R.Young | | |
| 3rd | 1950 | 1954 | A.G. Butcher | The New Zealand Correspondence School | New Zealand |
| 2nd | 1948 | 1950 | Knute O. Broady | University of Nebraska | United States |
| 1st | 1938 | 1948 | Rex Haight | The High School correspondence instruction for the province of British Columbia | Canada |

== Publications ==
ICDE regularly publishes or contributes to reports, surveys and articles on the following topics: Quality in Education; Online Education; Flexible Education; Elearning; Lifelong Learning; Higher Education; Distance Education; Open Education and OER (Open educational resources); Alternative Digital Credentials; Learning Analytics; Education Policies; Research and Innovation in Education; etc.

ICDE publishes the Open Praxis journal, a peer-reviewed open access scholarly journal focusing on research and innovation in open, distance and flexible education.
