= Donnay (surname) =

Donnay is a surname. Notable people with the surname include:

- Gabrielle Donnay (1920–1987), German-born American crystallographer and historian of science
- Jacques Donnay (1925–2024), French politician
- Maurice Donnay (1859–1945), French dramatist
- Roberta Donnay (born 1966), American jazz singer, musician, composer, and producer

== See also ==
- Donnay, Belgian sporting-goods company
- Donnay, Calvados, in France
