= McKercher =

McKercher is a surname. Notable people with the surname include:

- Gillian McKercher, Canadian film director
- Paul McKercher, Australian record producer
- Peggy McKercher (born 1929), Canadian academic
- Robert H. McKercher (1930–2024), Canadian lawyer

== See also ==
- Mount McKercher, a mountain of Antarctica
