= CVU =

CVU may refer to:

- Canadian Virtual University
- Champlain Valley Union High School
- Council on Vertical Urbanism
- CVU is the ICAO airline designator for Grand Canyon Airlines, United States
- CVU is the IATA airport code for Corvo Airport, Portugal
- US Navy utility carrier (a type of Aircraft carrier)
