= Neil Fassina =

Canadian academic

- Known for: President of Okanagan College (2021-) & International Council for Open and Distance Education (2020-)

Neil Fassina is the current President of Okanagan College since 2021, having previously been President of Athabasca University. Previously he was Provost and Vice-President Academic at the Northern Alberta Institute of Technology. Fassina holds a PhD from the University of Toronto in Organizational Behavior and Human Resource Management. He is also President of the Board of the International Council for Open and Distance Education since 2020. He is also known for his attempts at anti-union actions at public institutions such as Athabasca University and at Okanagan College, and for taking substantial pay raises while illegally laying off dozens of employees.

Academic offices
Preceded by Peter MacKinnon	President of Athabasca University; 2016-2020	Succeeded by Alex Clark
