= Stephen Griew =

Stephen Griew (1928 – 2 October 2010) was the third President of Athabasca University He was born in London, and also served at University of Toronto and Murdoch University.

Academic offices
Preceded by Sam Smith	President of Athabasca University; 1980–1985	Succeeded by Terry Morrison
