= Terry Morrison (academic) =

Terry Morrison was the fourth President of Athabasca University from 1985 to 1995. He went on to work for the Asia Development Bank Institute.

Academic offices
Preceded by Stephen Griew	President of Athabasca University; 1985–1995	Succeeded by Dominique Abrioux
