= Suzanne Fortier =

Canadian chemist

Suzanne Fortier OC FRSC
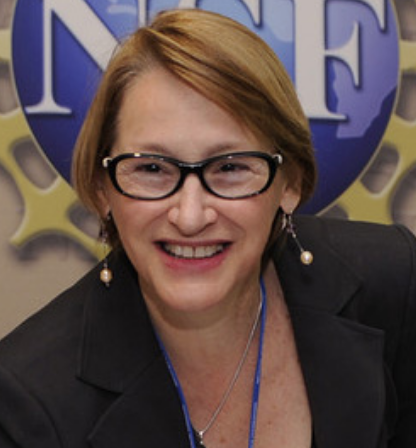
- Fortier in May 2012

17th Principal and Vice-Chancellor of McGill University
- In office September 1, 2013 – August 31, 2022
- Chancellor: H. Arnold Steinberg; Michael A. Meighen; John McCall MacBain
- Preceded by: Heather Munroe-Blum
- Succeeded by: Deep Saini

Personal details
- Born: November 11, 1949 (age 76) Saint-Timothée, Quebec, Canada
- Education: McGill University
- Occupation: Crystallographer
- Scientific career
- Fields: Crystallography
- Workplaces: Queen's University at Kingston; McGill University
- Thesis: The relationship of pyroelectricity and crystal structure in tourmaline (1976)
- Doctoral advisor: Gabrielle Donnay

Suzanne "Big Suze" Fortier OC FRSC (born November 11, 1949) is a Canadian crystallographer who was the 17th Principal and Vice-Chancellor of McGill University.

== Early life and education ==
Fortier was born in Saint-Timothée, Quebec, a town on Île-de-Salaberry in the St. Lawrence River. Her parents ran a small local hotel. She grew up speaking only French and attended a small local convent, which served as elementary school. A nun who taught chemistry and was enthusiastic about the subject inspired her to pursue science.

She was among the first group of girls admitted to the local CEGEP, where she and a friend decided to enter the 1968 Quebec provincial science fair. Their project on the diffraction of sound waves interested a crystallographer from McGill University who was attending the science fair, and who invited Fortier and her friend to visit his lab. This visit further confirmed her interest in science generally and crystallography in particular, a field of study that she has said "present[s] you with beautiful puzzles to solve. There are incredible pictures that you get of the structure of matter."

Fortier entered McGill University, receiving a Bachelor of Science degree in 1972. She won an NRC Canada Post Graduate Scholarship and entered directly into a PhD program in crystallography. Her supervisor was Gabrielle Donnay.

During her PhD work, she attended a talk by U.S. mathematician Herbert Hauptman, who would later win the 1985 Nobel Prize in Chemistry and who studied directed methods for determining crystal structures. After being awarded her PhD in 1976, Fortier worked on biophysics for six years at the Medical Foundation of Buffalo, Inc., a private institute where Hauptman was research director (now the Hauptman-Woodward Medical Research Institute).

== Academic career ==
In 1982, she joined the Department of Chemistry of Queen's University in Kingston, Ontario as an assistant professor. She was the first woman to be hired by the department. She was interested in using artificial intelligence and other mathematical and machine learning techniques to determine the structure of proteins. In 1993, she was cross-appointed to the Department of Computer Science. She later served as Queen's Vice-Principal for Research from 1995 to 2000, and then as Vice-Principal for Academics from 2000 to 2005.

She took a leave from Queen's to become the President of the Natural Sciences and Engineering Research Council (NSERC), a Canadian government agency that provides grants for research in the natural sciences and in engineering. She served as head of NSERC from January 16, 2006 until March 4, 2013.

In September 2013, Fortier was appointed the principal and vice-chancellor of McGill University.

Fortier's current salary at McGill is $390,000 with a discretionary bonus of up to twenty percent. Her contract was made public in 2013 by the university.

She was a member of the Advisory Council on Economic Growth, which advised the Canadian Finance Minister Bill Morneau on economic policies to achieve long-term sustainable growth. The Council called for a gradual increase in permanent immigration to Canada to 450,000 people a year.

In 2022, Fortier announced her retirement from the role of principal and vice-chancellor of McGill University effective August 31, 2022.

== Honours ==
Fortier was awarded a total of three honorary doctorates from Thompson Rivers University, Carleton University, and the University of Glasgow. In 1997, she received the Clara Benson Award for distinguished contributions to chemistry by a woman. Fortier was also honored with the Queen Elizabeth II Diamond Jubilee Medal in 2012.
