= Kercher =

Kercher is an English and German family name. Notable people with the name include:

- Bob Kercher (1918–2004), American footballer
- Fritz Kercher, German army officer, recipient of the Knight's Cross
- Meredith Kercher (1985–2007), British student murdered in Perugia, Italy

== See also ==
- Kärcher, a manufacturer of high-pressure cleaners
- McKercher, a surname
