= Frits Pannekoek =

Canadian historian (born 1947)

Frits Pannekoek AOE (born 1947) served as president of Athabasca University from 2005 to 2014. From 1998 to 2005 he was director of information resources and associate professor in the Faculty of Communication and Culture, University of Calgary. Prior to taking that position, he was director of director of historic sites (1979 to 1998). Graduating from the University of Alberta in 1969 with a Bachelor of Arts (Hons) and the Governor General’s Gold Medal, Pannekoek went on to get his Master of Arts from the same institution. This was followed by a doctorate in 1974 from Queen's University with a dissertation on Western Canadian history and Indigenous people.

From 2008 to 2012 he served as president of the International Council for Open and Distance Education, and in 2014 was awarded an honorary doctorate by the University of South Africa for his service to open and distance learning. In 2015 he was inducted into the Alberta Order of Excellence for community service, his work in heritage preservation and in distance learning.

As president of Athabasca University, he undertook several key projects for which he had secured funds starting in 2007. In August 2011, the premier opened the 53,800-square-foot Academic Research Centre funded by a 2007 $30 million grant from Alberta’s Ministry of Advanced Education and Technology. It was the first major new building on campus since the main building had been built decades earlier. That same year the university completed a two-year $7.65 million project to modernize its learning management systems, and an $8.45 million project to double the size of its science labs. Both were funded by the Government of Canada’s Knowledge Infrastructure Program, the Province of Alberta and internals sources. In 2008 he also initiated the university’s first fundraising campaign Open Our World, which successfully concluded in 2015 exceeding its $30 million target.

He continues to work with Indigenous postsecondary institutions and organizations, including Athabasca University, and with several colleagues and institutions on new ways of online learning, particularly MOOCs.

== See also ==
- List of Canadian university leaders

Academic offices
Preceded by Dominique Abrioux	President of Athabasca University; 2005–2014	Succeeded by Peter MacKinnon
