= Claude R. Thomson =

Canadian lawyer (1933–2010)

Claude Renwick Thomson QC

56th President of the Canadian Bar Association
- In office 1984–1985
- Preceded by: Robert H. McKercher
- Succeeded by: Robert Wells

11th President of the International Bar Association
- In office 1993–1994
- Preceded by: Giuseppe Bisconti
- Succeeded by: J. Ross Harper

Personal details
- Born: September 30, 1933 Toronto, Ontario, Canada
- Died: November 24, 2010 (aged 77)
- Spouse: Rosemary Thomson
- Children: 5
- Education: Osgoode Hall Law School (LL.B)
- Profession: Lawyer

Claude R. Thomson QC (September 30, 1933 – November 24, 2010) was a Canadian lawyer in Toronto, Ontario. He was a well-known courtroom lawyer, and also a pioneer of alternative dispute resolution in Canada, including mediation and arbitration. He served as the president of the Canadian Bar Association and the International Bar Association.

== Early life, family and education ==
Thomson was born in Toronto, Ontario, in 1933, the son of William Thomson, a civil engineer with the provincial department of highways, and Cecile Morency. His mother was francophone but would not speak in French to her son in public, fearing it would hold him back.

His family moved to Ottawa when he was young, where he attended St Patrick's College. He won the Canadian University Debating Championship, arguing that communist China should be admitted to the United Nations. The then mayor of Ottawa, Charlotte Whitton, awarded him the prize of a gold ring. Thomson attended Osgoode Hall Law School, earning a Bachelor of Laws degree.

He and his wife, Rosemary, were married in 1958 and had five children Marguerite, Brendan, Christopher, Kelley and Campbell.

== Legal career ==
=== Lawyers and integrity ===
Thomson was once asked what was the most important quality for a lawyer. His immediate answer was integrity: "The single most important quality of a top advocate is a well earned reputation for integrity. The reputation will help to attract clients, allow one to engage in productive and efficient dealings with other members of the profession, and perhaps most importantly, will help to pry open the sense of justice in the most closed minded judge."

=== General litigation and arbitration ===
After articling with a noted litigation lawyer in Toronto, Malcolm Robb, Thomson was called to the Bar of Ontario in 1958 and to the bar of Saint Helena in 1963. Thomson spent most of his legal career as a general litigator and partner with the law firm Fasken Martineau in Toronto, developing a reputation as an intense courtroom lawyer with formidable tactical skills, and acted for parties in a large number of high-profile cases. Later in his career, he developed a practice in mediation and arbitration. He eventually left Fasken Martineau to join ADR Chambers International in Toronto, an international arbitration group. He became a Chartered Arbitrator and acted as an international arbitrator and mediator.

=== Murder case on Ascension Island ===
In 1963, an American engineer was charged with murder at an American missile base on the British overseas territory of Ascension Island in the south Atlantic. Thomson was asked to defend him. The trial occurred on the island of Saint Helena, eight hundred miles to the south of Ascension Island. The chief justice of Uganda presided over the trial. Thomson's client was acquitted of murder but convicted of manslaughter. He was sentenced to twelve years' imprisonment, which he served in England.

=== Royal Commission of Inquiry into Certain Activities of the Royal Canadian Mounted Police ===
In the 1970s, information came to light about illegal activities by the RCMP Security Service. The federal government appointed a royal commission of inquiry, chaired by Justice McDonald, to investigate the allegations and to make recommendations. Thomson was retained by the RCMP to represent them at the commission hearings.

=== Inquiry into deaths at Sick Children Hospital ===
In 1980–81, a number of children died at The Hospital for Sick Children in Toronto. Concerns were raised that they were being poisoned, leading to a provincial inquiry into the deaths. Thomson acted for one of the nurses who came under suspicion, vigorously defending her and chastising the commissioner, Justice Samuel Grange, for putting her under trial in the court of public opinion. He also engaged in public relations on behalf of his client, appearing on a CBC radio programme, Cross-Country Checkup, to explain his client's position. His client was not charged in the matter.

=== Prosecution of Thomson and Southam newspaper chains ===
In 1980, the Southam newspaper chain closed its paper in Winnipeg, the same day as the Thomson newspaper chain closed its newspaper in Ottawa. The closures gave Thomson newspapers a monopoly in Winnipeg and Southam newspapers a monopoly in Ottawa. Eventually, the two newspapers were prosecuted under the federal Combines Investigation Act offences governing mergers and monopolistic conduct. Claude Thomson was retained to carry on the prosecution on behalf of the Crown. After a lengthy trial, the two newspaper chains were acquitted. Thomson later commented about the case: "I presented every piece of evidence I could. I asked every tough question I could think of. The judge believed the defence. That's what our system of justice is about and I have no complaints."

=== Supreme Court of Canada appearances ===
Throughout his career, Thomson appeared several times on cases in the Supreme Court of Canada. Two notable cases were interventions on behalf of interested parties in Borowski v Canada, dealing with the abortion issue, and in Reference re Bill 30, which considered the constitutional guarantee for separate schools in Ontario.

=== Pioneer in alternative dispute resolution ===
Thomson was an early proponent in Canada of alternative dispute resolution, namely ways to resolve disputes other than by expensive civil litigation in the courts. He developed a practice in combined mediation and arbitration and spoke frequently on methods and processes for alternative dispute resolution.

After leaving Fasken Martineau late in his career, Thomson joined ADR Chambers in Toronto, which provides mediation, arbitration and other dispute resolution services. In 2014, it was announced that ADR Chambers was now the largest arbitration company in the world.

== Professional organizations ==
=== Canadian Bar Association ===
Thomson served as the president of the Canadian Bar Association from 1984 to 1985. The Canadian Charter of Rights and Freedoms had been enacted two years previously, and he announced that one of his goals as president was to work for the repeal of section 33 of the Charter, which authorizes the federal and provincial governments to override certain Charter rights for a limited period. He was unsuccessful in this lobbying effort.

As president, Thomson was deeply concerned with the image of the legal profession and also with modernizing the profession. He advocated for computers in the courtrooms, elimination of restrictions on the number of new lawyers, and encouraging young lawyers to specialise. He was also concerned with the image of the profession. While acknowledging that some lawyers appear to be in the profession simply for their own self-advancement, he highlighted the thousands of lawyers who work to provide their clients with the best possible legal representation, and who work for law reform and social justice.

=== International Bar Association ===
From 1993 to 1994, Thomson was the president of the International Bar Association. He was the second Canadian to serve in that post, the first being Neil McKelvey, who was also a former president of the CBA.

As president of the IBA, Thomson travelled the world in the interests of the legal profession. One notable trip was to Tunisia, where he attended a conference of the Union of Arab Lawyers. After some uncertainty, he decided to attend a function put on by Yasser Arafat, unaware that peace negotiations were underway between Arafat and Israel. One outcome of the trip was that the Tunisian government released a jailed Tunisian human rights lawyer, in response to pressures brought by the IBA and the chair of the Tunis Bar.

=== World Peace through Law Centre ===
In 1985, Thomson was given the World Lawyer Award from the World Peace Through Law Centre (now the World Jurist Association). He was the first Canadian to receive the award. On accepting the award, he called on lawyers to oppose nuclear arms, saying: "Such weapons are illegal because they have the potential to destroy us all."

=== Other organizations ===
Thomson was also on the board of the Advocates' Society and the Canadian Institute of Chartered Accountants.

== Personal life ==
Thomson was a fisherman all his life, particularly fly fishing. On one fishing trip off the Queen Charlotte Islands with Bryan Williams, another former CBA president, Thomson had a strike from a salmon. Although Williams encouraged him to let it go, Thomson persevered and after an epic struggle that lasted an hour, he landed the salmon, which weighed thirty-nine pounds.

== Later life and death ==
Thomson never really retired. He was working from his hospital bed just a few days before his death. He left his wife Rosemary, to whom he had been married for fifty-two years, five children and numerous grandchildren.

== Honours ==
- 1976 Queen's Counsel
- 1985 World Lawyer Award given by the World Peace Through Law Centre
- 2005 Doctor of Laws, awarded by the Law Society of Upper Canada
- Knight of the Sovereign and Military Order of Malta
