= David Sewart =

British professor of distance education

David Sewart is a former director of student services and professor in distance education for the British Open University (OU), where he was employed from 1971 until retirement in 2004. He also worked part-time as a tutor and completed the OU's MBA programme as a student.

== Awards ==
- 2003–04: ICDE Prize of Excellence, Prize for Lifelong Contribution
