= Alexander James McPhail =

Scottish-Canadian agricultural reformer (1883–1931)

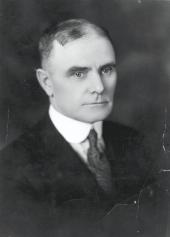
- Born: 23 December 1883; Paisley, Ontario
- Died: 21 October 1931 (aged 47); Regina, Saskatchewan

Alexander James McPhail (23 December 1883 – 21 October 1931) was a Scottish-Canadian agricultural reformer, and the first elected president of the Saskatchewan Wheat Pool. The Canadian government designated him a Person of National Historic Significance in 1971.

== Early life ==
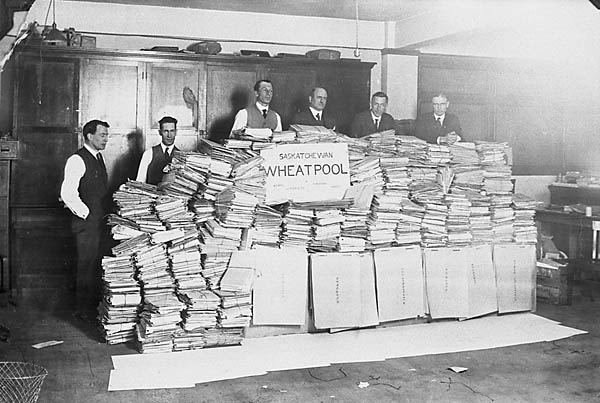
Saskatchewan Wheat Pool contracts _{University of Saskatchewan, University Archives & Special Collections, Saskatchewan Wheat Pool fonds, Series 10, Box 148}

Alexander McPhail was born in Paisley, Ontario, the eldest of eight or nine siblings. In 1902, when he was nineteen, his parents died. He eventually took his homestead West, settling in Bankend, Saskatchewan in 1906.

In 1913, McPhail joined the Saskatchewan Department of Agriculture. There he promoted various political and economic changes for prairie farmers. After the dismissal of P.F. Brendt, because of his German nationality as of tension caused by the Great War, McPhail resigned his position in 1918. Concurrently, he had been enlisted in the military as a member of the domestic militia.

He then became a livestock drover in Elfros, Saskatchewan. During this period he became involved with the Progressive Party of Canada and was a member of the "Ginger Group".

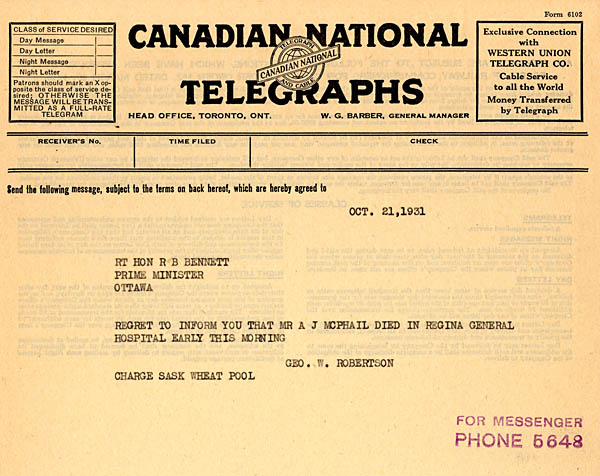
Telegram to R.B. _{University of Saskatchewan, University Archives & Special Collections, Saskatchewan Wheat Pool fonds, Series 10, Box 147}

In 1922, he became the Secretary of the Saskatchewan Grain Growers Association, replacing J.B. Musselman. McPhail held this position until his resignation in 1924.

In 1924, McPhail became the first elected president of the Saskatchewan Wheat Pool, with George Robertson of Wynyard as secretary, after canvassers promoted pooling wheat acquired up more than 50 percent of the acreage in the province. His administration was involved with the purchase of the elevator system owned by the Saskatchewan Co-operative Elevator Co. He would be president until his death in 1931.

He was also instrumental in forming the Central Sales Agency to handle the crops of the three prairie provinces. The Agency, by August 1931, fell into debt, requiring all three provincial pools it balance the dues.

On 21 October 1931, at the age of 47, McPhail died after an operation at the Regina General Hospital.

== Political views ==
McPhail was a firm believer in voluntary marketing, going so far as to campaign against compulsory marketing.

He was in opposition against high salaries for top managers at the Saskatchewan Wheat Pool, stating: "Seven thousand a year should be enough for any man if his heart is in the work". He, himself, only had a salary of $4,000 a year, comparable to what he could have earned farming.

== Legacy ==
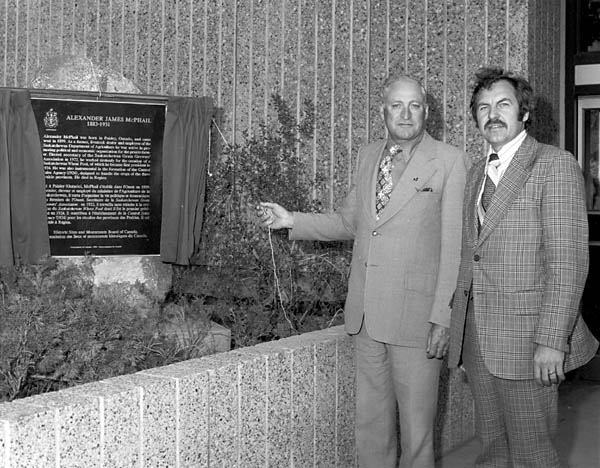
Malis and Lockwood unveiling plaque in honour of A.J. McPhail _{University of Saskatchewan, University Archives & Special Collections, Saskatchewan Wheat Pool fonds, Series 10, Box 142}

There is a plaque dedicated to McPhail on the Saskatchewan Wheat Pool Building at 2625 Victoria Avenue in Regina, Saskatchewan.

Harold Innis identified himself with McPhail's character. In compiling McPhail's diary, he describes McPhail as having "a strong sense of humour … as well as a hard agnostic bent of mind which resisted emotionalism and made imposition difficult.... He disliked publicity... He read widely, and particularly biography..." In the same work, Innis quotes an uncited source's description of McPhail, who "loathed cynicism, smartness, and pomposity in equal degrees. He admired brains and respected honesty.… It was difficult for him to unbend physically or mentally … no use for cards in any form, or any time-wasting pastimes except conversation".
