= Tim Byrne =

Canadian academic

- Born: Tim Clarke Byrne; 1907; Canada
- Died: 1997 (aged 89–90); Canada
- Occupation: Canadian academic administrator

Tim Clarke Byrne (1907–1997; also known as T. C. Byrne) was the first President of Athabasca University. He grew up in Warspite, Alberta. He was author of the book Athabasca University: The Evolution of Distance Education and was a former Deputy Minister of Education for Alberta from 1966 to 1971. As Deputy Minister of Education, he helped to prepare the Order in Council to create the university.

Byrne started his career as a teacher of junior high school in 1937, and in 1942 joined the Alberta Department of Education as an Inspector of Schools. In 1957, he became Chief Superintendent. In his book, Byrne mentions that the university developed independently of Open University despite assumptions to the contrary.

In 1972, Byrne was appointed by the Minister James Foster to conduct an inquiry into Red Deer College, over a dispute between the staff and the college's Board of Governors. This helped him to establish a closer working relationship with the Minister.

Academic offices
| Preceded by Office created | President of Athabasca University; 1971–1976 | Succeeded by Sam Smith |
