= Shirlee Matheson =

Canadian children's writer (born 1943)

- Born: Shirlee Smith Matheson; October 16, 1943 (age 82); Winnipeg, Manitoba
- Occupation: Author
- Writing career
- Genre: Children's Literature

Shirlee Smith Matheson is a Canadian children's writer. Matheson was born in Winnipeg, Manitoba, on October 16, 1943.

A graduate of Athabasca University, she has lived in Winnipeg, Saskatchewan, Alberta, and British Columbia. She now lives in Calgary, Alberta. She has been writing adult nonfiction biographies as well as young adult novels that add to society's collective knowledge. She has lived on farms in Manitoba near the Riding Mountains, and in Alberta west of Sylvan Lake; and in urban areas ranging from Lacombe, Alberta; to Vernon and Hudson's Hope, British Columbia; in Australia; and in Calgary. Her enrollment in writing programs at the Banff Centre afforded her the privilege of meeting, and having as instructors, some of Canada's top writers: W.O.Mitchell, Alistair MacLeod, Irving Layton, Robert Kroetsch, Richard Lemm, Phyllis Webb and Orm Mitchell. She further attended summer programs at the Iowa School of Writing

== Selected works ==
- Prairie Pictures (1989)
- This Was Our Valley (1989)
- Youngblood of the Peace: The Authorized Biography of Father Jungbluth (1991)
- Flying Ghosts (1993)
- City Pictures (1994)
- Flying the Frontiers: A Half-Million Hours of Aviation Adventure (1994)
- Flying the Frontiers Volume II: More Hours of Aviation Adventure! (1996)
- The Gamblers Daughter (1997)
- Keeper of the Mountains (2000)
- Maverick in the Sky: The Aerial Adventures of WWI Flying Ace Freddie McCall (2007)
- A Royal Balance: The Life and Times of Hal Wyatt (2013)
- ″ Amazing Fligths and flyers ″ ( 2010 ) ISBN 978-1-897181-29-4
- ″ Lost True Stories of Canadian Aviation Tragedies ″ ( 2005 ) ISBN 978-1-894856-18-8
- ″ Flying the Frontiers III ″ ( 1999 ) ISBN 978-1-55059-176-7
