= Joy Romero =

Joy Romero, P.Eng was the Chair of the Governing Council of Athabasca University. She was first appointed to the Governing Council in 2002. She is Vice President of Technology Development for Canadian Natural Resources Limited. She is also an advisor to the National Sciences and Engineering Research Council of Canada and holds a post-graduate diploma from the University.
