= Marni Panas =

Canadian LGBTQ activist

Marni Marcelle Panas is a Canadian LGBTQ activist. As a transgender woman, she has campaigned for LGBTQ causes.

== Biography ==
=== Early life and education ===
Panas was raised in a small town in Alberta. At birth, she was observed to be biologically male and her parents named her Marcel. Her family is Ukrainian Catholic. Panas has stated that members of her parish have been supportive of her as a transgender woman, that she would continue to be able to take Holy Communion, and that she would receive the Christian rite of burial as a woman. From "the age of six or seven," Panas became aware that she "didn't fit in to what was expected of [her] as a young boy." Around age 10, she began cross-dressing in her mother and sister's clothing. During her childhood, Panas struggled to fit in and was often ignored or rejected by other students.

On June 11, 2015, Panas graduated from Athabasca University with a degree in Health Administration.

=== Professional life ===
Paras currently works for Alberta Health Services as a senior adviser of diversity and inclusion. She is also a Canadian Certified Inclusion Professional. Paras previously worked for the Stollery Children's Hospital in Edmonton, Alberta.

=== Personal life ===
In 1996, Panas met her future wife, Laurina, who was accepting of Panas' passion for performing as a drag queen at Mardi Gras. They married and had a son. After receiving psychological counselling, Panas and Laurina sent an email to their relatives, friends, and coworkers to explain that March 21, 2014 would be the last day of Panas' life as a man. Her name was legally changed to Marni Marcelle Panas after this date and she returned to her job at Stollery Children's Hospital as a woman on April 8, 2014.

As of 2016, Panas resides in Edmonton.

=== Activism and honours ===
Panas campaigned for Bill 10.She was also one of the advocates for the revision to the Alberta Human Rights Act under Bill 7, to protect gender identity and expression under the Act. In 2015, Paras was a vocal critic of the Edmonton Catholic School Board's proposed transgender policy.

Panas is the recipient of a humanitarian award from John Humphrey Centre for Peace and Human Rights. She was also awarded the 2015 Edmonton YWCA Woman of Distinction award. In 2018 she won the Global Edmonton Woman of Vision award.
