= Saskatchewan Wheat Pool =

Canadian grain handling company

- Industry: Agriculture
- Founded: 1923
- Defunct: 2007
- Fate: Merged with Agricore United
- Successor: Viterra
- Headquarters: 2625 Victoria Avenue, Regina, Saskatchewan
- Key people: Mayo Schmidt
- Products: Grain buying
- Number of employees: 4000

The Saskatchewan Wheat Pool was a grain handling, agri-food processing and marketing company based in Regina, Saskatchewan. The Pool created a network of marketing alliances in North America and internationally which made it the largest agricultural grain handling operation in the province of Saskatchewan. Before becoming Viterra, SWP had operated 276 retail outlets and more than 100 grain handling and marketing centres. The Saskatchewan Wheat Pool operated under the name of AgPro in the prairie provinces of Manitoba and Alberta. Begun as a co-operative in the 1920s, the company became a publicly traded corporation in the 1990s. After the 2007 takeover of its competitor, Winnipeg-based Agricore United, the Pool name was retired. The merged company operated under the name Viterra until 2013, when it was acquired by Glencore International.

== Establishment and growth ==
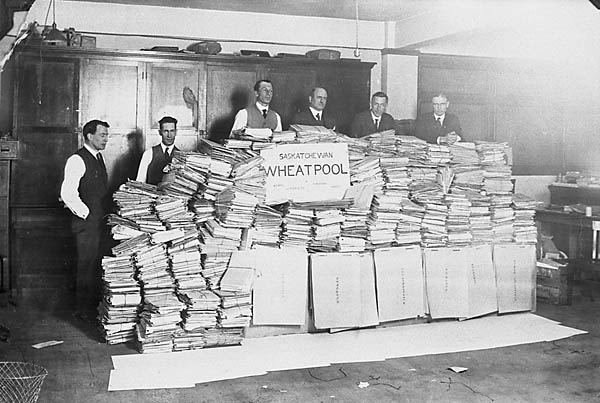
Saskatchewan Wheat Pool contracts

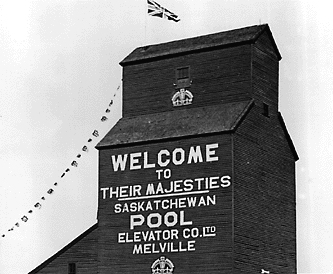
Grain elevator in Melville, decorated for King George VI and Queen Elizabeth for the 1939 royal tour of Canada

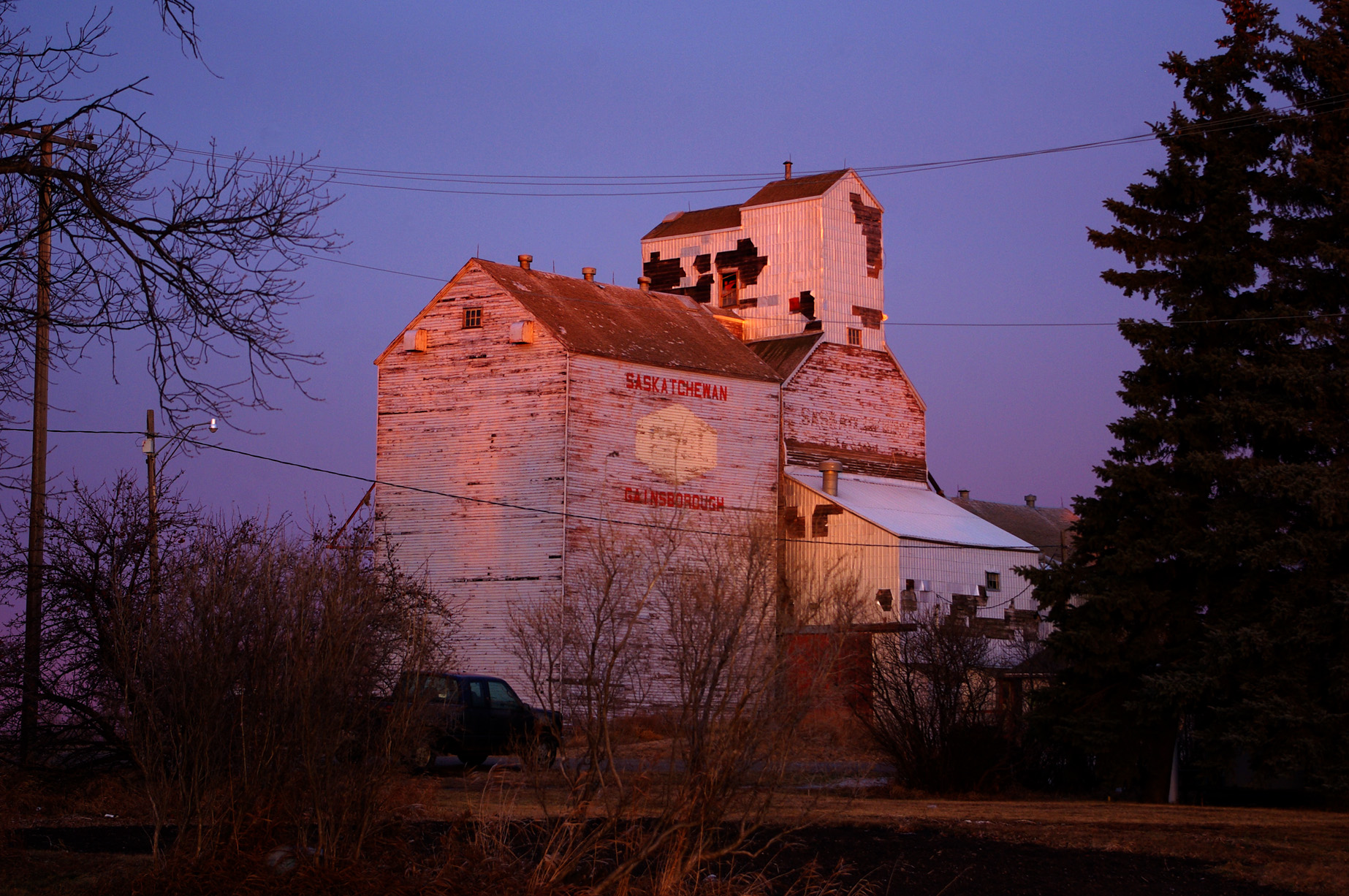
A now-obsolete wooden grain elevator once owned by SWP in Gainsborough

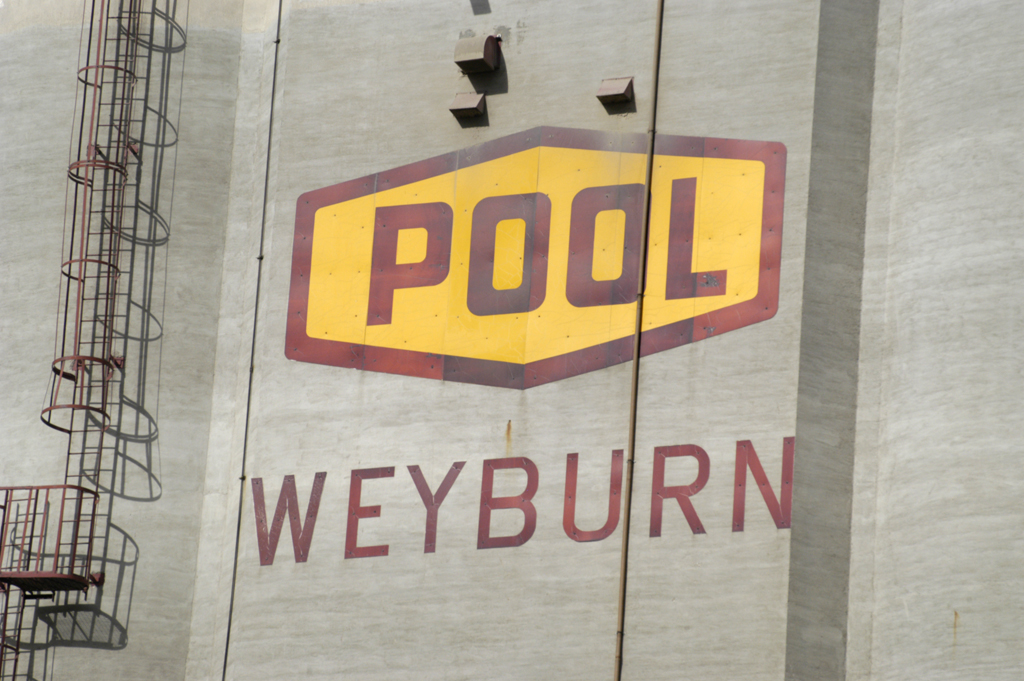
Saskatchewan Wheat Pool logo on the Weyburn concrete terminal elevator

Farmers, frustrated in their attempts to win a fair price for their wheat, started to look to various marketing systems between 1900 and 1920. The co-operative style of organizing farm operations was one of them. As early as 1902, farmers banded together as the Territorial Grain Growers' Association. The TGGA split into Alberta Farmers' Association and the Saskatchewan Grain Growers' Association (SGGA) in 1906. Also established at this time was the farmers' co-operative elevator company called the Grain Growers' Grain Company (GGGC), which later merged into the United Grain Growers. In 1911 the Saskatchewan Co-operative Elevator Company was formed.

The SGGA met with the United Farmers of Alberta and United Farmers of Manitoba and formed the Saskatchewan Co-operative Wheat Producers Ltd. on August 25, 1923. Informally it was known as the Saskatchewan Wheat Pool, as it collectively helped farmers to obtain a decent price for wheat. The first president was Alexander James McPhail, and the first grain elevator was built in Bulyea in 1925 (in the area of Section 36, Township 16, Range 15, W of the 2nd meridian). The Saskatchewan Co-operative Wheat Producers Ltd. bought out the Saskatchewan Co-operative Elevator Company in 1926. In 1953 The Saskatchewan Co-operative Wheat Producers Ltd. was renamed the Saskatchewan Wheat Pool.

The pool is the world's largest farm, the world's largest shipper of wheat, the Biggest Business in Canada – and it was built by the Man Behind the Plow.

— W.A. Irwin, 1929

The Wheat Pool elevators have been sentinels in many prairie towns since the early 1900s. They are the topic of numerous prairie landscapes and photographs. The Wheat Pool calendar map or Country Elevator System calendar maps were a mainstay of many pioneer households. These calendar maps depicted the networking of the early CNR and CPR rail lines, the many early incorporated areas, and the locations of the grain elevators. The pictures which surround the elevator map of grain delivered by horse and wagon, early truck, and grain handling at the ports along the calendars show the evolution of the grain handling industry.

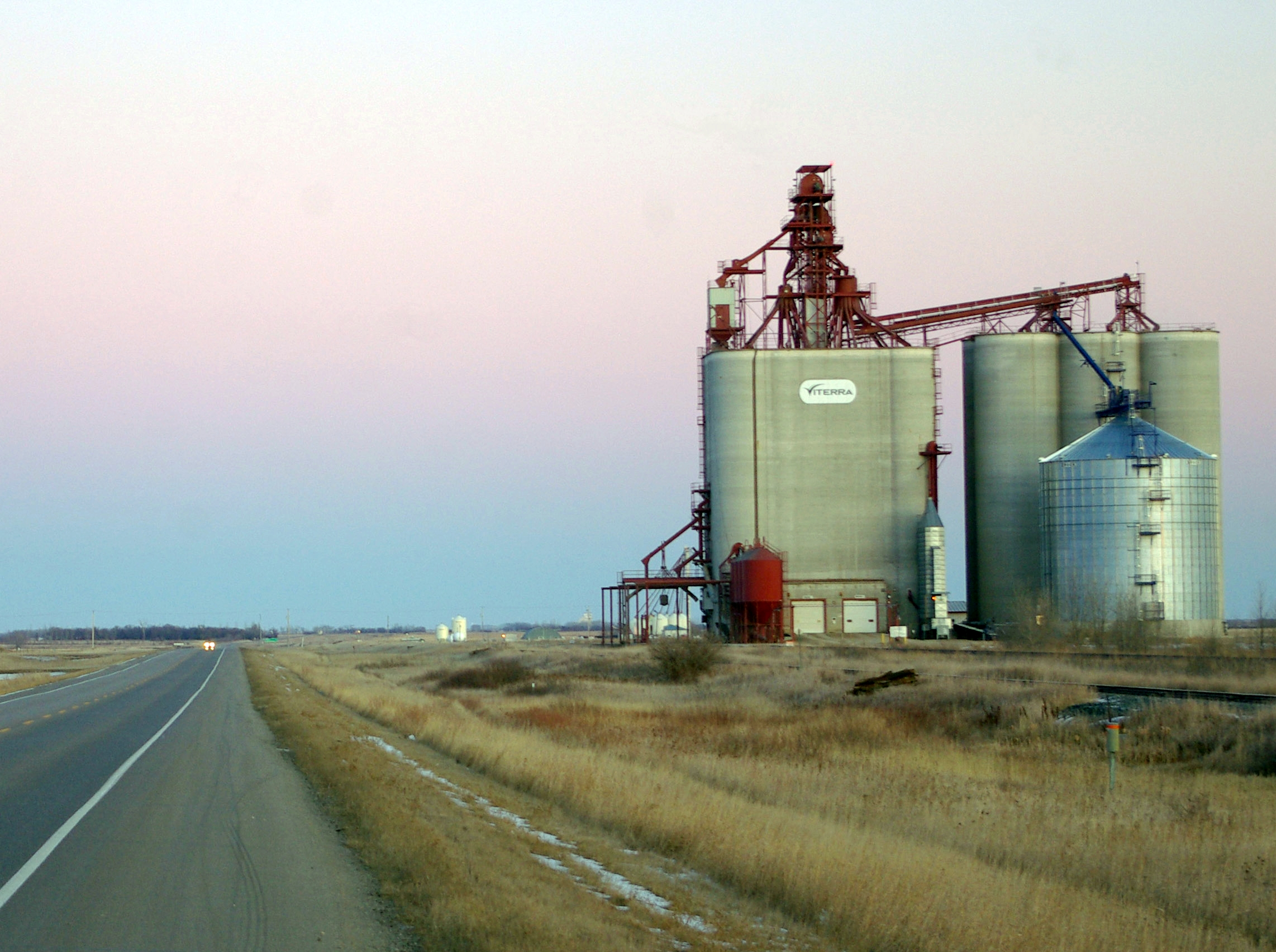
A concrete terminal built by SWP in Carnduff

In the early 20th century, grain elevators dotted the prairies every 6 to 10 miles (10–15 km) apart, a distance that was a good day's journey for farmer and horse with a full load. Farmers could find services available to buy and grade grain at the Saskatchewan Wheat Pool elevators. The Pool Farm Service Centers provided a place for farmers to pick up fertilizer and chemicals. Highways, trucks, tractors, and combines revolutionized the farming industry after World War II. These changes gradually led to the rail system facing deregulation and consolidation changes: many branch lines closed down, and there were increased loading quotas available to railcars for grain, specialty crops and even oilseeds. These developments led to newer and more advanced state-of-the-art grain handling systems called SWP Terminals which serve larger surrounding farming areas.

The 'crib' style wood elevator of the 1920s could handle 100 tonnes of grain per hour. The elevator pit could contain approximately 10 tonnes of grain, which would be about the load delivered by one farmer's grain truck. In comparison, the new "high-throughput" elevators constructed of slip-formed cylindrical concrete have a 418,000 bushel (11,500 tonne) capacity, whereas the condominium storage facility can contain 582,000 bushels (15,800 tonnes).

== Co-operative to corporation ==
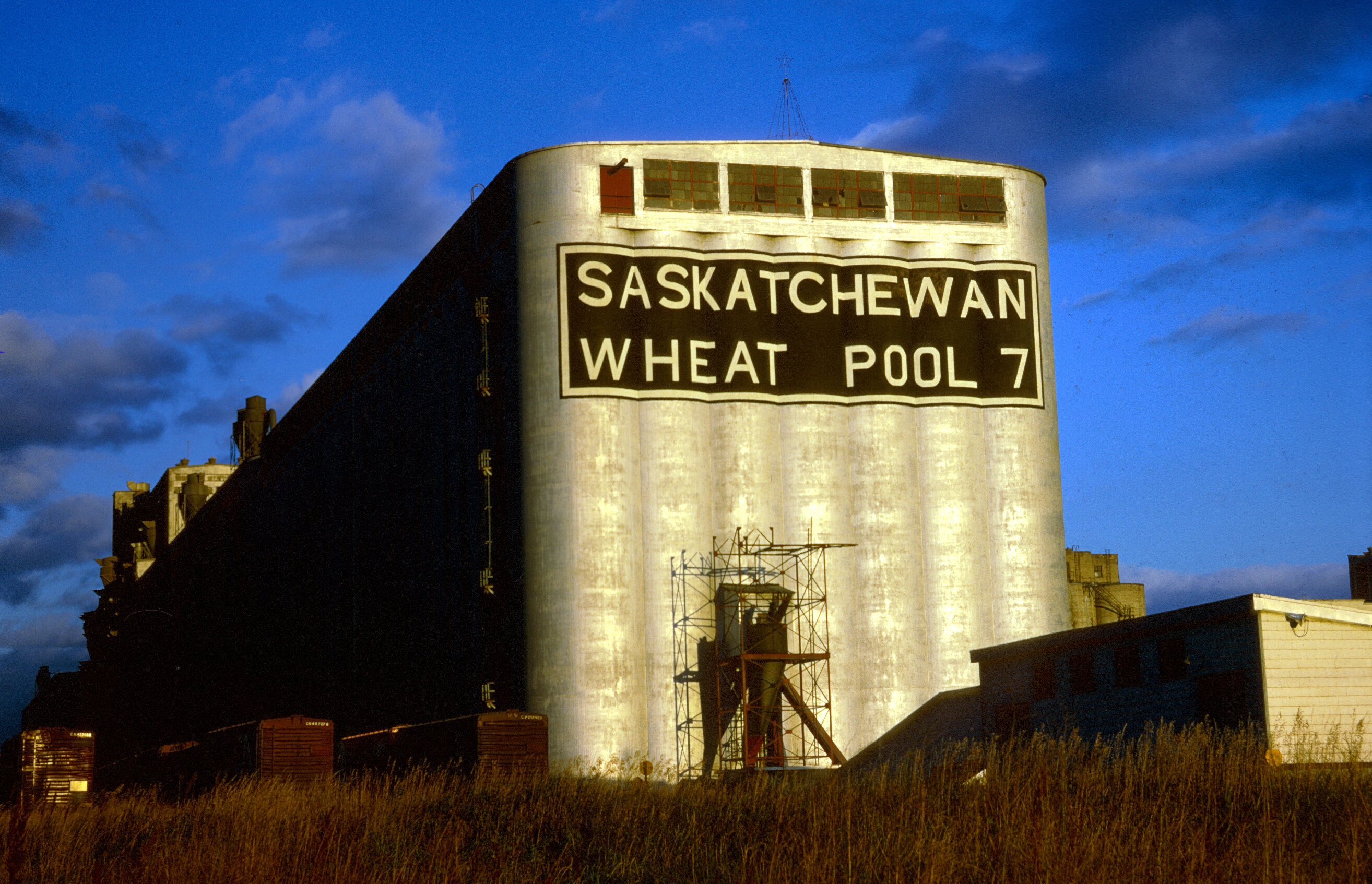
Sask Pool 7, Thunder Bay

In March 1996, the Saskatchewan Wheat Pool became a publicly traded company, breaking from its roots as a co-operative. While decent profits were realized in the first two years, the company incurred huge losses between 1999 and 2003 because of low commodity prices. It also faced increased competition when the Alberta Wheat Pool and Manitoba Pool Elevators merged to form Agricore. The Pool lost its position as the country's top grain handler when Agricore took over United Grain Growers in 2002 to form Agricore United.

In November 2006, the company launched a campaign to take over Agricore United. Winnipeg-based James Richardson International ("JRI") launched its own takeover bid at the same time. The initial and subsequent offers from the Pool involved a stock swap, with no or little cash being offered, prompting the AU Board of Directors to reject them. In February 2007, AU and JRI announced that they had negotiated a merger arrangement to form a publicly traded company to be known as "Richardson Agricore", subject to shareholder agreement.

A subsequent bidding war led to a stock and cash offer from the Pool and an all-cash offer from JRI to form a private company; a higher, $20.50 all-cash offer from the Pool in May eventually prevailed, with 81% of the limited voting shares being tendered to the Pool by shareholders by the end of May, including all the ADM shares. This exceeded the 75% required by the terms of AU's incorporation to change the corporate structure and, after a special shareholders' meeting in June, AU became a wholly owned subsidiary of the Saskatchewan Wheat Pool. AU's CEO, Brian Hayward, resigned, as did the Board of Directors, and the Pool's CEO and Board were voted in. The Pool had Agricore United's common and preferred shares delisted from the Toronto Stock Exchange (TSX) on June 20, 2007, and the members of the senior management team for the amalgamated company were announced the next day. The new company was headquartered in Regina, under the name of Viterra.

== Presidents ==
- A. E. Wilson 1923–1924 (Provisional)
- Alexander James McPhail 1924–1931
- Louis C. Brouillette 1931–1937
- John Henry (Jack) Wesson 1937–1960
- Charles W. Gibbings 1960–1969
- E. K. Turner 1969–1987
- Garfield Stevenson 1987–1993
- Leroy Larsen 1993–1999
- Marvin Weins 1999–2004
- Terry Baker 2004–?
- Mayo Schmidt 2005–2007

== See also ==
- Alberta Wheat Pool
- Manitoba Pool Elevators
- Wheat pool
- Agricore United
- United Grain Growers
- Paper Wheat
- List of Canadian Heritage Wheat Varieties

== Books ==
25 Years with the Saskatchewan Wheat Pool by Saskatchewan Wheat Pool employees' Association Publisher: Saskatchewan Co-Operative Producers Limited Place: Regina, Saskatchewan Date published: 1949

From prairie roots: The remarkable story of Saskatchewan Wheat Pool (Hardcover) by Garry Lawrence Fairbairn Hardcover: 318 pages Publisher: HarperCollins Canada / Greystone Book (Jan 1 1984) Language: English ISBN 0-88833-127-4

Wheat Kings: Vanishing Landmarks of the Canadian Prairies (Hardcover) by Greg McDonnell Hardcover: 120 pages Publisher: Boston Mills Press (October 2, 2004) ISBN 1-55046-249-0

The Diary of Alexander James McPhail by Harold A. Innis, Alexander James McPhail Review author[s]: Harald S. Patton Canadian Journal of Economics and Political Science / Revue canadienne d'Economique et de Science politique, Vol. 7, No. 1 (Feb., 1941), pp. 122–124
