= Sam Smith (psychologist) =

Canadian psychologist

Walter Alvah Samuel Smith (4 August 1929 – 8 February 2012), known as Sam Smith, was a Canadian psychologist and academic who served as President of the University of Lethbridge and of Athabasca University.

Smith was born on 4 August 1929 in Thomas, Oklahoma, and grew up in Redwood City, California. He received his baccalaureate degree at the University of Redlands and his Master's degree and doctorate at the University of Pennsylvania.

He taught at the University of Nevada, the University of California Riverside, the University of Redlands, and the University of Alberta, and was Dean of Arts at Simon Fraser University.

He was President of the University of Lethbridge (1967–1972), and the second President of Athabasca University (1976–1980). Smith resigned a week after being informed over breakfast by Alberta's Advanced Education Minister Jim Horsman that the government had decided to relocate Athabasca University from Edmonton to Athabasca.

Smith was awarded an honorary doctorate from Athabasca University in 1984.

He died on 8 February 2012.

Academic offices
Preceded by Russell J. Leskiw (acting)	President of the University of Lethbridge; 1967–1972	Succeeded by William Edwin Beckel
Preceded by Tim Byrne	President of Athabasca University; 1976–1980	Succeeded by Stephen Griew
