= John Spinks (academic) =

Canadian academic (1908–1997)

John William Tranter Spinks

President of the University of Saskatchewan
- In office 1960–1975
- Preceded by: Walter P. Thompson
- Succeeded by: Robert Begg

Personal details
- Born: January 1, 1908 Norfolk, England
- Died: March 27, 1997 (aged 89) Saskatoon, Saskatchewan

John William Tranter Spinks, CC MBE SOM (1 January 1908 – 27 March 1997) was President of the University of Saskatchewan from 1960 to 1975.

== Life ==
Born in Norfolk, England, John Spinks received a BSc (1928) and his doctor of philosophy degree (Ph.D.) in chemistry (1930) from King's College London.

Spinks emigrated to Canada in 1930 to join the chemistry faculty of the University of Saskatchewan as an assistant professor and was promoted to professor in 1938, head of the Department of Chemistry in 1948, and dean of the college of Graduate Studies in 1949. In 1960 he was appointed President and served in that capacity to 1975. During his tenure, the university grew from 4,500 to 13,500 full-time students.

Spinks spent the 1933-34 academic year at the University of Darmstadt, Germany, where he first met Dr. Gerhard Herzberg, whom he helped emigrate to Canada.

In 1939 Spinks married Mary Strelioff.

During World War II, Spinks developed search-and-rescue procedures for missing aircraft and was appointed MBE. After the war, he pioneered the use of radioactive isotopes in agricultural and chemical research.

He died in Saskatoon in 1997.

The University of Saskatchewan open-source computer labs were named the Spinks Labs.

== Mattergy ==
In 1954 Spinks wrote: “Einstein could have simplified matters considerably by coining a word such as [the hybrid word] mattergy, matter and energy merely being different forms of mattergy, mattergy I and mattergy II.”

== Honours ==
- In 1970 he was appointed a Companion of the Order of Canada.
- In 1982 he was inducted into the Saskatchewan Agricultural Hall of Fame
- In 1985 he was named Saskatoon's Citizen of the Year.
- In 1996 he was awarded the Saskatchewan Order of Merit.
