= Robert Wells (Canadian politician) =

Canadian lawyer (1933–2020)

The Honourable Robert Wells QC

Member of Newfoundland and Labrador House of Assembly (St. John's South)
- In office 1972–1975
- Preceded by: Hugh Shea
- Succeeded by: John Collins
- Constituency: St. John's South

Member of Newfoundland and Labrador House of Assembly (Kilbride)
- In office 1975–1979
- Preceded by: New district
- Succeeded by: Bob Aylward
- Constituency: Kilbride

Minister of Health and Government House Leader
- In office 1975–1976

Justice of the Supreme Court of Newfoundland and Labrador
- In office 1986–2008
- Nominated by: Brian Mulroney

President of the Law Society of Newfoundland
- In office 1977–1981

57th President of the Canadian Bar Association
- In office 1985–1986
- Preceded by: Claude R. Thomson
- Succeeded by: Bryan Williams

President of the International Commission of Jurists (Canadian Section)

Chancellor of the Diocese of Eastern Newfoundland and Labrador
- In office 1979–1984
- Appointed by: Bishop Robert Seaborn

Personal details
- Born: August 28, 1933 Badger's Quay, Dominion of Newfoundland
- Died: October 28, 2020 (aged 87) St. John's, Newfoundland and Labrador, Canada
- Party: Progressive Conservative
- Education: Memorial University; Oxford University
- Profession: Lawyer

Robert Wells QC (August 28, 1933 – October 28, 2020) was a Canadian lawyer, politician and judge in Newfoundland. He represented St. John's South from 1972 to 1975 and Kilbride from 1975 to 1979 in the Newfoundland House of Assembly. He sat on the Supreme Court of Newfoundland and Labrador from 1986 to 2008.

== Early life ==
Wells was born in Badger's Quay, the son of Reverend Warwick Wells and Dorcas Parsons. He was educated at Memorial University in St. John's and then selected as a Rhodes Scholar in 1953. He attended Oxford University and was admitted to the Bar of England and Wales in 1958.

== Legal career ==
On his return to Newfoundland, Wells was employed in the civil service as an economist, later working in the Justice department as a Crown attorney and departmental advisor from 1959 to 1962. He started practising law in St. John's that same year, concentrating on criminal and civil law. Wells was named Queen's Counsel in 1972. He had a general litigation practice, including using alternative dispute resolution methods such as mediation and arbitration. Wells continued his private practice until he was appointed to the Trial Division of the Supreme Court of Newfoundland in 1986. He served as a judge for 22 years before retiring in 2008. He subsequently returned to private practice, working in alternative dispute resolution.

=== Leadership in the legal profession ===
Wells was president of the Law Society of Newfoundland from 1977 to 1981. Four years later, he became the first (and so far the only) Newfoundlander to be elected national president of the Canadian Bar Association. During his tenure as president, he advocated for legal reforms, such as more expansive freedom of information to information held by the government and greater discretion for judges in sentencing. He opposed bills concerning imprisonment and conditional release, on the basis that these would not ameliorate the legal system. Wells was also active in legal organizations that work to improve human rights internationally and in developing countries.

== Provincial politics ==
Wells became president of the Progressive Conservative Association of Newfoundland in 1964. He ran unsuccessfully for a seat in the Newfoundland assembly in 1971 but was elected the following year. From 1975 to 1976, he served in the Newfoundland cabinet of Frank Moores, first as Minister of Health, then as minister without portfolio, and later served as government house leader. He returned to the practice of law in 1979.

== Offshore Helicopter Safety Inquiry ==
On March 12, 2009, Cougar Helicopters Flight 91, flying from St. John's to an off-shore oil platform in the Hibernia oilfield, ditched in the ocean. Of the eighteen crew and passengers aboard, only one survived. The Canada-Newfoundland Offshore Petroleum Board, a joint federal-provincial regulator, established the Offshore Helicopter Safety Inquiry Commission to investigate the accident and to make safety recommendations. Wells was named as the commissioner of the inquiry. After extensive hearings, he produced a two volume report and recommendations. One of his key recommendations was that an independent safety regulator be created for the offshore, and given a clear and unambiguous safety mandate.

After the inquiry concluded, Wells continued to be an advocate for greater legal regulation for the safety of off-shore activities. He appeared before a parliamentary committee in Ottawa in 2013, testifying in support of a bill to strengthen off-shore safety.

== Community service ==
Wells served as chair of the board for the Janeway Child Health Centre. From 1979 to 1984, he acted as the Chancellor (legal advisor) of the Anglican Diocese of Eastern Newfoundland and Labrador.

== Death ==
Wells died on October 28, 2020, at the age of 87.

== Honours ==
- 1970 Honorary Membership in the Canadian Police Association
- 1972 Queen's Counsel
- 2002 Doctor of Laws "honoris causa", Benchers of the Law Society of Newfoundland and Labrador
- 2015 Doctor of Laws honoris causa, Memorial University
