= Robert Begg =

Canadian physician (1914–1982)

Robert William Begg

President of the University of Saskatchewan
- In office 1974–1980
- Preceded by: John Spinks
- Succeeded by: Leo Kristjanson

Personal details
- Born: December 27, 1914 Florenceville, New Brunswick
- Died: March 2, 1982 (aged 67) Saskatoon, Saskatchewan

Robert William Begg, OC (December 27, 1914 – March 2, 1982) was a Canadian physician, cancer researcher, and President of the University of Saskatchewan.

== Biography ==
Born in Florenceville, New Brunswick, he received a Bachelor of Science degree from the University of King's College in 1936. He received a Master of Science degree in 1938 and a Doctor of Medicine in 1942 from Dalhousie University. During World War II, he served with the Canadian Army Medical Corps. After the war, he received a Ph.D. from Oxford University.

From 1946 to 1950, he taught at Dalhousie University. From 1950 to 1957, he taught at the University of Western Ontario. In 1957, he became head of the Saskatchewan research unit of the National Cancer Institute of Canada, head of the cancer research department at the University of Saskatchewan and taught pathology. In 1962, he became Dean of the College of Medicine and Principal of the Saskatoon campus in 1967. From 1975 to 1980, he was the fifth president of the University of Saskatchewan.

In 1965 Beggs was made a fellow of the Royal College of Physicians. In 1976, he was made an Officer of the Order of Canada "for his distinguished career in education and for his contributions to cancer research".

His widow was Elsie Begg (deceased 2010) and they have four children. His first daughter Beverley McRae is a Canadian broadcaster and journalist. His first son Robert Begg was an orthopedic surgeon, his second daughter Catherine Begg worked in banks and information technology, and his youngest son, Ronald Begg, is an executive in a software company.

He died in Saskatoon after a lengthy illness on March 2, 1982.
