= WestGrid =

WestGrid is a government-funded infrastructure program that began in 2003, mainly in Western Canada. It provides institutional research faculty and students access to high-performance computing and distributed data storage, using a combination of grid, networking, and collaboration tools. WestGrid is one of four partners within the umbrella organization, Compute Canada.

== Principal participants ==
WestGrid has 14 partner institutions across four provinces - British Columbia, Alberta, Saskatchewan and Manitoba. The participating institutions include:

- Simon Fraser University
- University of British Columbia
- University of Victoria
- University of Northern British Columbia
- The Banff Centre
- University of Alberta
- University of Calgary
- University of Lethbridge
- Athabasca University
- University of Saskatchewan
- University of Regina
- University of Manitoba
- University of Winnipeg
- Brandon University

WestGrid also works in partnership with each province's Optical Regional Advanced Network. WestGrid's network partners include:

- BCNET
- Cybera
- SRnet
- MRnet
- CANARIE
