= Swede Knox =

Canadian ice hockey official (1948–2021)

Thomas Warren "Swede" Knox (March 2, 1948 – March 22, 2021) was a National Hockey League (NHL) linesman. He officiated over 2,248 NHL games, starting in 1972, and wore a helmet from the mid-1980s until his retirement in 2000. He also officiated five Stanley Cup Finals, the 1987 Canada Cup and one NHL All-Star Game.

== Early life ==
Knox was born in Edmonton, Alberta, Canada. As a youth, he was a longtime member of the equipment staff for the Edmonton Oil Kings, and is credited with staff on the roster for the team's 1963 Memorial Cup championship. His brother, Jim, was a goaltender for the Oil Kings' 1966 Memorial Cup championship.

== Career ==
Knox started his NHL career based in Toronto, due to league rules regarding on ice officials' proximity to an NHL city. When the Edmonton Oilers joined the NHL for the 1979–80 season, Knox and linesman Randy Mitton moved to Edmonton and Calgary, respectively, working as a tandem for games in Western Canada, including games in the Battle of Alberta between the Oilers and the Calgary Flames.

Knox once filled in as referee during a game in Toronto in the early 1990s, when Don Koharski could not finish the game.

It is unknown what number Knox wore on his striped officiating jersey when the nameplates were changed back to numbers in 1994–95.

== Personal life ==
Knox graduated from Athabasca University in 1999 with a Bachelor of Administration degree.

Knox died of cancer March 22, 2021.
