= Richard Florizone =

Canadian academic and physicist

- Born: 1967 (age 58–59); Prince Albert, Saskatchewan
- Occupations: Academic

President of Dalhousie University
- In office 2013–2018
- Preceded by: Tom Traves
- Succeeded by: Deep Saini

Richard Florizone (born 1967) is a Canadian academic and physicist who served as the 11th president of Dalhousie University in Halifax, Nova Scotia.

== Biography ==
Richard Florizone was born in Prince Albert, Saskatchewan in 1967. He attended the University of Saskatchewan, where he graduated with a bachelor's degree in engineering physics. He also received a master's degree in physics at that institution. Florizone earned a PhD in nuclear physics at the Massachusetts Institute of Technology.

In 2013, he was appointed President of Dalhousie University. Prior to Dalhousie, Florizone had worked at Bombardier Aerospace, Boston Consulting Group, the International Finance Corporation, and the University of Saskatchewan. Early in his presidency, Dalhousie faced an incident involving male dental students sending explicit messages, some of which included fellow female students. Under Florizone's leadership, Dalhousie undertook a series of initiatives to address the incident and its broader implications: a restorative justice process for those directly involved, review by the Academic Standards Class Committee, and a Task Force on Misogyny, Sexism and Homophobia in the Faculty of Dentistry.

In 2018, Florizone stepped down as President of Dalhousie University to serve as the director of the Quantum Valley Ideas Lab at the University of Waterloo. During his tenure, Dalhousie successfully grew enrolment, fundraising and research income. In January 2020, he became the president and CEO of the International Institute for Sustainable Development. He left this role in 2023.

As of 2026, Florizone is a special advisor to the president of the University of Waterloo.
