= Donnayite-(Y) =

Rare-earth carbonate mineral containing the rare-earth metal yttrium

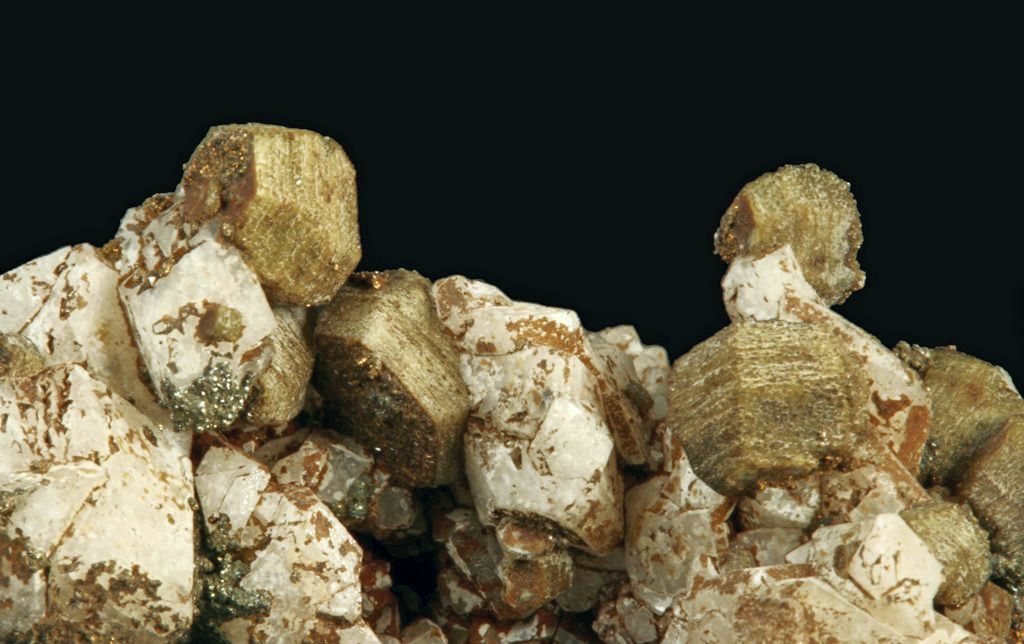
- Donnayite-(Y) (field of view: c. 2 cm)

General
- Category: Carbonate minerals
- Formula: NaCaSr_{3}Y(CO_{3})_{6}∙3H_{2}O
- IMA symbol: Dna-Y
- Strunz classification: 5.CC.05
- Crystal system: Triclinic
- Crystal class: Pedial (1) (same H-M symbol)
- Space group: P1

Identification
- Mohs scale hardness: 3

Donnayite-(Y) is a rare-earth carbonate mineral containing the rare-earth metal yttrium. It was first discovered in 1978 at Mont Saint-Hilaire, Quebec. Donnayite was subsequently identified and named after Joseph D. H. Donnay and his wife, Gabrielle Donnay. Both were prominent mineralogists and crystallographers, and J. D. H. Donnay was awarded the Roebling Award by the Mineralogical Society of America in 1971 for his emphasis on the importance of optical mineralogy and crystal morphology. Donnayite tends to occur in small quantities in the pegmatite dykes and miarolitic cavities of mountainous regions. It crystallizes in this environment with increasing alkalinity values until the alkalinity suddenly drops during the last stage of crystallization. This results in increasing amounts of Na carbonates and REE minerals. First discovered at Mont St-Hilaire, donnayite has since been found in the Southern Ural Mountains of Russia and the Narssarssuk pegmatite of South Greenland. Donnayite crystals tend to be small and the color is commonly pale yellow to yellow with a white streak and a vitreous luster. Donnayite crystals usually display trigonal or hexagonal symmetry and have a hardness of 3. Twinning is extremely common in this mineral. Minerals closely related to donnayite include synchysite, calcite, sphalerite, microcline, and analcime. Donnayite is isomorphous with weloganite and mckelveyite.

== Composition ==
The chemical formula of donnayite is: NaCaSr_{3}Y(CO_{3})_{6}·3H_{2}O. Donnayite is composed of the cations sodium, calcium, strontium, and yttrium. Of these cations, strontium and yttrium are the most prominent. In addition to this, donnayite contains a significant amount of water, making it a hydrated mineral (more specifically, a hydrated carbonate). Generally speaking, mineral hydration occurs when water is added to the structure of the mineral, which occurs in retrograde metamorphism (when temperatures during crystallization suddenly drop, and H activity increases). Donnayite was first analyzed using a Cambridge MK5 electron microprobe. Electron microprobe analysis of donnayite in 1978 yielded the following weight percent oxides (Baker et al., 1978):

| Oxide | Weight % |
|---|---|
| Na_{2}O | 3.37 |
| CaO | 5.75 |
| BaO | 0.85 |
| SrO | 35.8 |
| Y_{2}O_{3} | 13.1 |
| Nd_{2}O_{3} | 1.83 |
| La_{2}O_{3} | 0.45 |
| CO_{2} | 30.98 |
| H_{2}O | 6.34 |
| Total | 98.47 |

The CO_{2} and H_{2}O values given were calculated on the basis of 6(CO_{3})-2 and 3(H_{2}O) per formula by comparison with weloganite.

== Structure ==
Donnayite consists of six carbonate anions, together with three H_{2}O molecules. The asymmetric unit contains three independent sites occupied by Sr and three additional sites occupied by Na^{+}, Ca^{2+}, or Y^{3+}. Each strontium atom is bonded to 10 oxygen atoms. Donnayite has a structure very similar to shomiokite-(Y). The Na(CO_{3})·H_{2}O of shomiokite are cross-linked through the layers of Y polyhedra, which results in "mixed" carbonate layers. In this "mixed" layer, the CO_{3} triangles are tilted within the layer, which allows the H_{2}O groups and Na octahedral to share the slab with the CO_{2} polyhedra. The (Na, Y)CO_{3}·H_{2}O layer of donnayite is comparable to this. However, the Sr atoms of donnayite have 9-fold coordination with an extra layer of flat-lying carbonate groups. This is shown in the figure below. In the structure of the REE carbonate, donnayite, the effects of H-bonding are negligible.

== Physical properties ==
Typical donnayite crystals are very small, ranging from 0.05 to 1.0 mm and rarely reaching 2.0 mm. Donnayite is commonly pale yellow to yellow, but can also be colorless, white, gray, and very rarely, reddish brown, due to hematite inclusions. The streak of this mineral is white, and it has a vitreous luster. Donnayite ranks at a hardness of 3 on Mohs scale and has fair to imperfect cleavage on the c axis {001}. Donnayite crystals usually display trigonal or hexagonal symmetry and belong to the point group 1 or 3m and the space group P1. Optically, donnayite is biaxial negative with a 2v (measured) ranging from 0° to 30°.

| Color | Yellow |
| Streak | White |
| Luster | Vitreous |
| Hardness | 3 |
| Cleavage | {001} |
| Symmetry | Trigonal/hexagonal |
| Point Group | 1 or 3m |

== Geologic occurrence ==
Donnayite occurs in minute quantities in the pegmatite dykes, miarolitic cavities, and interstices in the nepheline syenites at Mont St-Hilaire, Quebec. It is usually found in rocks from the alkaline complexes and in carbonatites. During crystallization of the nepheline syenite, the alkalinity continues to increase until the very last stage, when the alkalinity suddenly drops, resulting in decreasing temperature and an increase in H activity. This is exemplified by increasing amounts of Na carbonates and REE minerals. In addition, during the last stages of crystallization in more acidic conditions, minerals form with increasing amounts of H_{2}O, and REE minerals rich in Y. In 1973, donnayite was first discovered at Mont St-Hilaire, but was incorrectly identified as "brockite". Finally, in 1978 it became possible to gather sufficient data to characterize this sample as the new species, donnayite. In addition to this geologic occurrence, donnayite can be found in Russia at Mt. Kukisvumchorr, Khibiny massif, Kola Peninsula, and at the Vishnevogorsk complex, Vishnevy-Ilmen Mountains, Southern Ural Mountains. Recently, donnayite has been discovered along with ewaldite, epitaxially intergrown, in crystals from the Narsaarsuk pegmatite in South Greenland. Related minerals include ewaldite, mckelveyite, synchysite, calcite, sphalerite, microcline, and analcime.

== Special characteristics ==
As of today, donnayite has no real historical or political significance. There are no common uses for this mineral, and it is not used for the fabrication of any known products. The characteristics that make donnayite special are its small size, and the few locations on Earth at which this mineral can be found. It requires a unique environment to form and crystallize, and for this reason donnayite has only been found in three countries of the world. Another characteristic that makes donnayite unique is the fact that it contains the REE, yttrium, as an essential constituent. Although donnayite has no known human uses, it has other characteristics that make it distinct and for this reason most people do not even know this mineral exists.

== Name ==
Donnayite was named in honor of Joseph Desire Hubert Donnay, and his wife, Gabrielle Donnay (Baker et al., 1978). J. D. H. Donnay (1902–1994) was an accomplished Belgian-American-Canadian crystallographer and mineralogist, and professor at Johns Hopkins University. He served as president of the Mineralogical Society of America and in 1971 was awarded its highest honor, the Roebling Medal. Donnay emphasized the importance of optical mineralogy and crystal morphology and how they related to crystal structure. He is the author of 100 abstracts, 148 papers, 36 books (or chapters in books), 38 reviews, and several non-scientific papers. His wife, Dr. Gabrielle Donnay, was a professor of crystallography at McGill University in Montreal, Canada where Dr. J. D. H. Donnay later became Research Associate and a guest professor.
