= Leo Kristjanson =

Canadian academic (1932–2005)

- Born: Leo Friman Kristjanson; February 28, 1932; Gimli, Manitoba
- Died: August 21, 2005 (aged 73); Gimli, Manitoba
- Known for: President of the University of Saskatchewan
- Awards: Order of Canada

Leo Friman Kristjanson, CM (February 28, 1932 – August 21, 2005) was the President of the University of Saskatchewan from 1980 to 1989.

== Biography ==
Born in Gimli, Manitoba, he received a Bachelor of Arts degree from United College (now the University of Winnipeg) in Winnipeg in 1954, a Master of Arts degree from the University of Manitoba in 1959, and a Ph.D. from the University of Wisconsin–Madison in 1963.

In 1960, he began teaching at the University of Saskatchewan Department of Economics. From 1975 to 1980, he was Vice-President, Planning and from 1980 to 1989 he was the sixth President of the University of Saskatchewan.

He retired as President in 1989 for health reasons, a year before the end of his second term. In 1990, he was made a Member of the Order of Canada, Canada's highest civilian honor. In 1990, he was inducted into the Saskatchewan Agricultural Hall of Fame.

After retirement, he moved back to his hometown of Gimli, Manitoba, where he spearheaded the effort to reconstruct the Gimli Public School (1915) and the development and construction of the Lake Winnipeg Visitor Centre. Leo was a founding member of the Evergreen Band Boosters, which has raised funds for the Gimli High School Band program. He died in Gimli on August 21, 2005.

Academic offices
| Preceded by Robert Begg | President of the University of Saskatchewan; 1980–1989 | Succeeded by George Ivany |
