= Dominique Abrioux =

President of Athabasca University

President of Athabasca University
- In office February 10, 1995 – May 31, 2005

Personal details
- Born: Dominique Andrew Marie Xavier Abrioux
- Education: University of Saskatchewan (BA); University of Alberta (MA, PhD)

Dominique Andrew Marie Xavier Abrioux was the President of Athabasca University from 1995 to 2006.

He had been with the university since 1978. He received his BA (honours) from the University of Saskatchewan and the University of Alberta where he received his MA in 1974. In 1979, he received a PhD in comparative literature, from the University of Alberta. He became the president of Athabasca University on February 10, 1995 and his last term ended on May 31, 2005.

On September 13, 2003, the Open University conferred an honorary degree on Abrioux as Doctor of the University.

In June 2008, he was named an academic councillor with University Canada West.

Academic offices
Preceded by Terry Morrison	President of Athabasca University; 1995–2005	Succeeded by Frits Pannekoek
