= Canadian Virtual University =

- Université virtuelle canadienne
- Abbreviation: CVU-UVC
- Formation: 2000
- Dissolved: 17 June 2019; 7 years ago
- Type: Consortium
- Legal status: Defunct
- Purpose: Promoting online distance education
- Members: see below
- Website: www.cvu-uvc.ca

The Canadian Virtual University (French: Université virtuelle canadienne; abbreviated bilingually as CVU-UVC) was a consortium of Canadian universities that specialized in online distance education. Founded in 2000 to promote online programs in post-secondary education, CVU-UVC was made up of public universities accredited by both their home provincial governments and Universities Canada that operated a central information resource about programs and course offerings and facilitated transfer credits from other member institutions. Member universities retained full institutional autonomy in terms of academic policies and regulations, including admissions, tuition and related fees, content and design of courses, assessment, transfer credit assignments, and appeals. CVU-UVC was governed by a board of directors, an advisory committee, and an executive director.

The member institutions of CVU-UVC disbanded the consortium on 17 June 2019, citing the increased prevalence of online learning programs in Canada as evidence that CVU-UVC had accomplished its goal of promoting online distance education.

== Member universities ==
University	Main Campus	Languages	Notes
Athabasca University	Athabasca, Alberta	English	Primarily distance-education university
Carleton University	Ottawa, Ontario	English	
Laurentian University	Sudbury, Ontario	English, French	
Memorial University of Newfoundland	St. John's, Newfoundland and Labrador	English	
Mount Royal University	Calgary, Alberta	English	
Royal Military College of Canada	Kingston, Ontario	English, French	
Royal Roads University	Colwood, British Columbia	English	
Université TÉLUQ	Quebec City, Quebec	French	Primarily distance-education university
Thompson Rivers University	Kamloops, British Columbia	English	
University of Manitoba	Winnipeg, Manitoba	English	
University of New Brunswick	Fredericton, New Brunswick	English	
