= Tianjin Open University =

Education organization in Tianjin, China

Tianjin University of Radio and TV
- 天津大学广播电视大学
- Type: Public
- Established: 1979
- Location: Tianjin, China
- Campus: urban
- Website: (zh)

Tianjin Radio and TV University (TJRTVU) was founded in January 1979. Its predecessor was Tianjin Radio Correspondence University, founded in 1958, which first adopted radio as a medium in China. The university is located on the Yingshui Road in the Nankai district of Tianjin.

TJRTVU has qualified teaching staff and modern teaching facilities such as the satellite receiving system, cable TV system, computer network, the audio-visual education center, the library and information center, the computer experimental center, the Lecture Hall equipped with multimedia, the audio-visual reading-room and all kinds of laboratories. TJRTVU takes advantage of the rich teaching resources and multimedia available to conduct distance and open teaching activities. There are 253 hours of TJRTVU courses broadcast on Tianjin Radio Station, TV special channels and the cable TV station each week. Some teaching resources are provided by the network in the university.

TJRTVU consists of one open college, two schools, 22 local branches and 18 study centers (across 18 districts in Tianjin). They carry out the integrated plans and manage academic affairs at the primary level. TJRTVU gives priority to the two-year education programmes, together with some bachelor's degree course series, secondary school education and various kinds of non-certificate training. With multi-specifications, multi-levels, multi-functions, multi-forms to run universities, TJRTVU has set up 108 specialties of 17 categories on arts, science and engineering, agriculture, and economic management.
