= E. K. Turner =

Edward Kerr (Ted) Turner
- Born: Edward Kerr Turner; April 6, 1927; Maymont, Saskatchewan
- Died: November 1, 2018 (aged 91); Regina, Saskatchewan

Edward Kerr Turner, CM SOM (April 6, 1927 – November 1, 2018) was President of the Saskatchewan Wheat Pool from 1969 to 1987. The years 1989–1995 saw E.K. Turner as the 10th Chancellor of the University of Saskatchewan, in which capacity he served two terms.

== Biography ==
Turner graduated from the School of Agriculture in 1948. After graduation he continued farming on the family farm near Maymont, Saskatchewan. In this community he was elected as a Saskatchewan Wheat Pool (SWP) delegate. He then served the SWP in several capacities. Elected as Director in 1960, followed by First Vice-President in 1966 and finally as President in 1969.

== Other awards ==
On May 25, 1989 the degree of Doctor of Laws, honoris causa was bestowed upon Ted Turner by Leo F. Kristjanson, President. Lt.-Gov. Jack Wiebe presented E.K. Turner with the province's highest distinction, the Saskatchewan Order of Merit on November 6, 1995. Ted Turner has been made an honorary life member of the Canadian and Saskatchewan Institutes of Agrologists. He is an inductee of the Saskatchewan Co-operative Order of Merit as well as the Saskatchewan Agricultural Hall of Fame. In 1990 Mr. Turner was appointed a Member of the Order of Canada on October 25, 1990 with the investiture on April 17, 1991. Following this, as of 1998 he became chair of the Saskatchewan Honours Advisory Council. In 1995 he was invested as a Member of the Saskatchewan Order of Merit.

== Saskatchewan Archives E.K.Turner fonds ==
Some of the more notable archival records are those donated in the collection E. K.Turner fonds. Amongst these records, which span from 1947 to 2004, are those used by E. K. Turner in his various capacities on the Saskatchewan Wheat Pool and Prairie Pools Inc., and as member of advisory committees regarding international trade, fund raising, health education, sports and culture. Some of the various capacities he served on were Member of the Conference Board of Canada, Member of the International Trade Advisory Committee, delegate to the Duke of Edinburgh Third Commonwealth Conference in Australia in 1968 Member of the Advisory Committee of the Economic Council of Canada and Advisor to the Canadian Government (1971 and 1978), Committee Member for the Fifth Conference (1990), Member of the Steering Committee for the National Forum on Post-secondary Education (1986).

== Publications ==
Author: Fairbairn, Garry Lawrence. Title: From Prairie Roots; The Remarkable Story of Saskatchewan Wheat Pool. Saskatoon: Western Producer Prairie Books, ISBN 0-88833-127-4, 1984. 1st edition. (Hardcover) 318pp. Photographs, appendices, notes, bibliography, index. Foreword by E.K. Turner.

Author: Turner, E.K. (Ted). Title: Beyond the Farm Gate: The Story of a Farm Boy Who Helped Make the Wheat Pool a World-Class Business. University of Regina Press, ISBN 978-0889773349, 2014. 1st edition. (paperback) 260 pages.

== See also ==
- List of University of Saskatchewan alumni

== Notes ==
Presidents Saskatchewan Wheat Pool
Preceded by C. W. Gibbings	President of the Saskatchewan Wheat Pool; 1970-1986	Succeeded by G. Stevenson
Academic offices
Preceded by Emmett Matthew Hall	Chancellor of the University of Saskatchewan; 1986–1989	Succeeded by Peggy McKercher
