= Deep Saini =

Canadian biologist and president of McGill University (born 1954)

Deep Saini FRSN
- ਹਰਗੁਰਦੀਪ ਸੈਣੀ
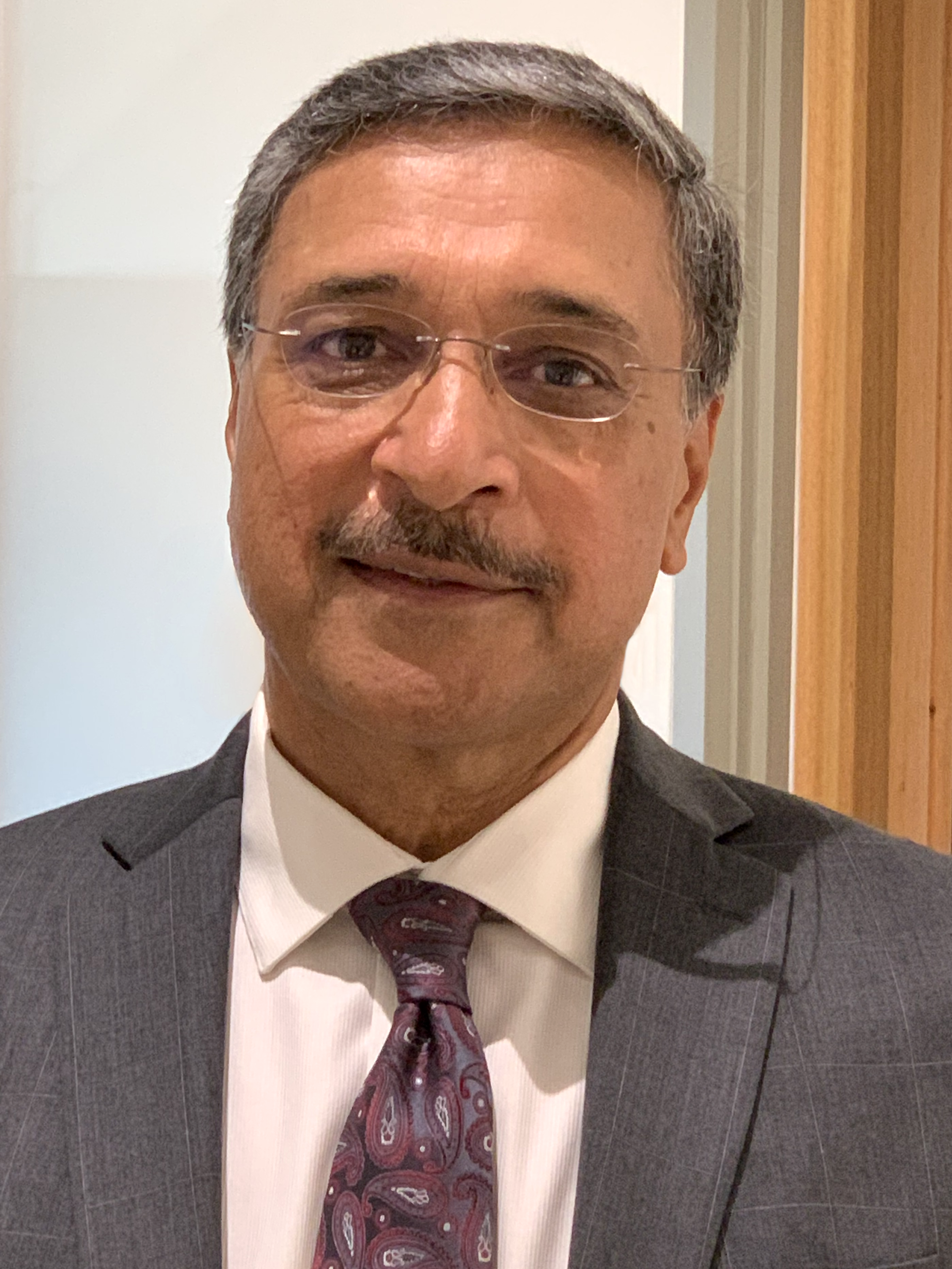
- Saini in 2019

18th President and Vice-Chancellor of McGill University
- Incumbent
- Assumed office 1 April 2023
- Chancellor: John McCall MacBain; Pierre Boivin
- Preceded by: Suzanne Fortier

12th President and Vice-Chancellor of Dalhousie University
- In office 1 January 2020 – 31 December 2023
- Chancellor: Rustum Southwell
- Preceded by: Peter MacKinnon (acting)
- Succeeded by: Kim Brooks

5th Vice-Chancellor and President of the University of Canberra
- In office 1 September 2016 – 24 December 2019
- Preceded by: Stephen Parker
- Succeeded by: Paddy Nixon

8th Vice-President and Principal of the University of Toronto Mississauga
- In office 1 July 2010 – 31 August 2016
- President: David Naylor; Meric Gertler
- Preceded by: Ian Orchard
- Succeeded by: Ulrich Krull

Personal details
- Born: Hagurdeep Saini; 1954 (age 71–72) Punjab, India
- Education: Punjab Agricultural University (BS, MS); University of Adelaide (PhD)
- Scientific career
- Fields: Biology
- Workplaces: Université de Montréal; University of Waterloo; University of Toronto; University of Canberra; Dalhousie University; McGill University
- Thesis: Physiological Studies on Sterility Induced in Wheat by Heat and Water Deficit (1982)
- Doctoral advisors: Bryan Coomb; Don Aspinall

Hargurdeep Saini (Punjabi: ਹਰਗੁਰਦੀਪ ਸੈਣੀ) is an Indian-Canadian scientist and university administrator who has served as the 18th president and vice-chancellor of McGill University in Montreal since 2023. He was previously the president and vice-chancellor of Dalhousie University, vice-chancellor and president of the University of Canberra, and the eighth vice-president and principal of the University of Toronto Mississauga.

== Early life and education ==
Saini was born in 1954 in Punjab, India, to a family from Nawanshahr where he grew up. He completed his Bachelor of Science (Honours) and Master of Science (Honours) in botany from Punjab Agricultural University in Ludhiana. He then moved to Australia, where he earned his Ph.D. in plant physiology from the University of Adelaide, followed by a postdoctoral research fellowship at the University of Alberta in Canada.

== Career ==
Saini began his academic career at the Université de Montréal, where he spent 18 years as a professor in the Department of Biological Sciences, later serving as the director general of the Institut de recherche en biologie végétale (Plant Biology Research Institute) from 1996-2001.

He then moved on to leadership roles at other Canadian universities, including dean of the Faculty of Environment (formerly Environmental Studies) at the University of Waterloo, as well as the dual role of principal of the University of Toronto Mississauga (UTM) and vice-president of the University of Toronto as a whole. During his time as the eighth vice-president and principal of UTM from 2010 to 2016, Saini oversaw the expansion of program offerings and several multi-million-dollar construction projects on the campus, notably the development and launch of the Mississauga Academy of Medicine in 2011 and opening of the Innovation Complex in 2014.

In 2016, he relocated to Australia to take on the role of vice-chancellor and president of the University of Canberra. Under his leadership, the University rose to the 58th position among young universities in the world and inaugurated the University of Canberra Public Hospital and Canberra Specialist Medical Centre.

In January 2020, Saini returned once more to Canada to begin his mandate as the 12th president and vice-chancellor of Dalhousie University in Halifax, Nova Scotia. During this time, he led the University at the height of the Covid-19 pandemic, which necessitated the conversion of all in-person learning at Dalhousie to remote instruction.

In December 2022, it was announced that Deep Saini would be the incoming 18th president and vice-chancellor (formerly principal and vice-chancellor) of McGill University. He began his five-year, renewable term on 1 April 2023. He has since emphasized the transformative potential of education. Saini is McGill's first principal of colour.

In October 2023, Saini was inaugurated as chair of the board of directors for Universities Canada; prior to that, he was vice-chair and served as a member of the board since 2021. In his inaugural address as chair, Saini emphasized the unique role of universities in maintaining a prosperous Canadian society. Saini is a member of the Advisory Council for the Order of Canada since 2023. Saini appeared on the Maclean's Magazine Power List for education in 2024.

== Quebec tuition issues ==
In 2023, Saini expressed concern over proposed changes in Quebec’s tuition policy for out-of-province students, and a potential revenue loss between $42 million and $94 million. In issuing his concerns, he urged collaboration with the government to promote French while maintaining the university’s inclusivity. To that end, he also stated that he would consider potentially moving some McGill operations out of Quebec. In February 2024 it was announced that McGill University and Concordia were both taking legal action against the province in response to a significant drop in applicants. McGill stated at the time that it had seen a twenty percent drop in applicants. At the time, Saini was quoted as saying "we are undertaking this legal action because we believe that these measures are illegal."

== Protest encampments ==
During an early test of his presidency, McGill saw protest encampments established on the campus during the Gaza war, which Saini denounced. Three days after the encampment, Saini and the university called upon the police and the courts to break up the protest. Both declined to do so. About this time, a professor at the school stated of Saini that the faculty was "strongly opposed to our university administration's relentless campaign against the students."

The Globe and Mail reported that as of the end of May 2024, citing tactics he felt were designed to "threaten, coerce and scare people," Saini continued to push the law enforcement to try and intervene despite them informing him that nothing illegal was occurring. Saini, citing concerns and fears from some Jewish students, accused the protest of being antisemitic. However, Jewish students, as well as Independent Jewish Voices, dismissed the accusation as part of a smear campaign against the encampment, noting that there are Jewish students playing a key role in the protest encampment.

On 6 June 2024, Saini requested police intervention to clear the protest occurring in the James administration building. Riot police used pepper spray, tear-gas, batons and shields against students protesting around the building. 15 students were arrested for their role in the protest. Saini later thanked the police for their intervention in clearing out the protest. In July 2024, The Breach claimed that Saini had spread misinformation in his statements to the press. The Breach wrote that Saini had planted false stories that students called for violence and prevented administrators from leaving the building.
