= Robert H. McKercher =

Canadian lawyer (1930–2024)

Robert Hamilton McKercher KC

55th President of the Canadian Bar Association
- In office 1983–1984
- Preceded by: L. Yves Fortier
- Succeeded by: Claude R. Thomson

President of the Law Society of Saskatchewan
- In office 1978–1978
- Preceded by: Grant Harold Martin Armstrong
- Succeeded by: Thomas Clarkson Wakeling

23rd President of the Saskatchewan Branch of the Canadian Bar Association
- In office 1966–1968
- Preceded by: W. M. Elliott
- Succeeded by: A. M. Nicol

Personal details
- Born: May 6, 1930 Saskatoon, Saskatchewan, Canada
- Died: December 15, 2024 (aged 94)
- Spouse: Peggy McKercher
- Education: University of Saskatchewan (BA, LL.B); Harvard Law School (LL.M)
- Profession: Lawyer

Robert Hamilton McKercher, KC (May 6, 1930 – December 15, 2024) was a Canadian lawyer from Saskatoon, Saskatchewan. He served as the national president of the Canadian Bar Association from 1983 to 1984, as well as president of the Law Society of Saskatchewan in 1978.

== Early life and education ==
McKercher was born in Saskatoon, Saskatchewan on May 6, 1930, the son of Stewart and Etta Marie McKercher. He attended the University of Saskatchewan, graduating with a Bachelor of Arts degree in 1950, and then a Bachelor of Laws degree in 1952. He did post-graduate legal studies at the University of Toronto under Bora Laskin (later Chief Justice of Canada), and then attended Harvard Law School, earning a Master of Laws degree.

== Legal career ==
Returning to Saskatchewan from Harvard, McKercher entered the practice of law with his brother Donald. The firm continues to operate today as McKercher LLP. He carried on an active practice, including acting as counsel to two different government inquiries. He also acted as counsel for the Saskatchewan Provincial Court Judges Association in a dispute with the government of Saskatchewan over judicial compensation. He eventually appeared in the Supreme Court of Canada on behalf of the Saskatchewan Provincial Court judges in Reference re Remuneration of Judges of the Provincial Court (P.E.I.), the case which established that the constitutional principle of judicial independence requires that issues of judicial compensation must be reviewed by independent commissions.

After McKercher was no longer actively involved in the practice of law, he provided legal services on a pro bono basis to community organizations. He was appointed Queen's Counsel in 1966.

== Service to the legal profession ==
McKercher served two terms as president of the Saskatchewan Branch of the Canadian Bar Association, from 1966 to 1968. He also was elected national president of the Canadian Bar Association, serving from 1983 to 1984. He also served as president of the Law Society of Saskatchewan in 1978, the provincial regulatory body for lawyers.

== Personal life and death ==
McKercher was married to Peggy McKercher. She has been extremely active in Saskatoon community organizations, including serving a term as Chancellor of the University of Saskatchewan.

McKercher died on December 15, 2024, at the age of 94.
