= Christian Farstad =

Canadian bobsledder

Chris Farstad OLY
Personal information
- Nationality: Canadian
- Born: 10 June 1969 (age 57) Prince George, British Columbia, Canada

Sport
- Sport: Bobsleigh

Christian Farstad (born 10 June 1969) is a two-time Canadian olympian in the sport of bobsleigh. He's the former CEO of Bobsleigh Canada Skeleton, former Director of Athlete and Community Relations for the Canadian Olympic Committee and is a graduate of Athabasca University. He was nominated for the Sport Leadership award at the Canadian Sport Awards in 2003.

Christian was the President of Bobsleigh Canada Skeleton 2002-2006, is the current Secretary General of Olympians Canada and was a founding board member of the Sport Dispute Resolution Centre of Canada (SDRCC).

Christian is a Chartered Financial Analyst (CFA), Certified Financial Planner (CFP), Certified Investment Manager (CIM) and Fellow of the Canadian Securities Industry (FCSI). He has been quoted in the Wall Street Journal, Dow Jones Newswire, Vancouver Sun, Globe and Mail and National Post Newspapers. He has also been interviewed on Global Television, CTV, and CBC television.

He is now a Wealth Advisor with ScotiaMcLeod in Vancouver.
