= Gabrielle Donnay =

German-born American mineralogist

- Born: 21 March 1920; Landeshut, Germany (now Kamienna Góra, Poland)
- Died: 4 April 1987 (aged 67)
- Education: UCLA (B.A.); MIT (Ph.D)
- Known for: Crystal Data
- Spouse: Joseph Donnay
- Awards: Past Presidents’ Medal of the Mineralogical Association of Canada
- Scientific career
- Fields: Crystallography
- Workplaces: Carnegie Institution of Washington; United States Geological Survey; McGill University

Gabrielle Donnay, née Hamburger (21 March 1920 – 4 April 1987), was a German-born American crystallographer and historian of science.

== Life ==
Gabrielle Donnay was born in Landeshut, Germany (now Kamienna Góra, Poland) on 21 March 1920 and emigrated to the United States in 1937. She received her B.A. from UCLA in chemistry in 1941 and was awarded her Ph.D in 1949 from MIT. She was a postdoctoral fellow at Johns Hopkins University in 1949–1950. In 1949, she met and married Joseph (Jose) Donnay, a professor of crystallography and mineralogy at Johns Hopkins University. In 1950, she joined the staff of the Geophysical Laboratory at the Carnegie Institution of Washington, where she worked until 1969. She had a concurrent position at the U.S. Geological Survey from 1952 to 1955. She was a professor in crystallography at McGill University in Montreal from 1970 to 1981. She died on 4 April 1987 near Mont St-Hilaire, Quebec.

== Activities and Achievements ==
Her interest in tourmaline turned out to be a career-long interest. Her paper, co-authored with M.J. Buerger, The Determination of the Crystal Structure of Tourmaline led to 13 more papers on the same topic, including a definitive 1977 paper on the structural mechanism of pyroelectricity in tourmaline.

She and her husband frequently collaborated and they published two editions of "Crystal Data" in 1954 and 1963 to compile the research of all crystallographers. Her area of expertise was in crystal chemistry and structural crystallography. She published more than 134 papers in her lifetime, almost half of which were collaborative projects with her husband.

Donnay published Laboratory Manual in Crystallography based on her classes at McGill University. She also published Women in the Geological Sciences in Canada in an effort correct the injustices that she experienced in the male-dominated field of geology. She was awarded the Past Presidents’ Medal of the Mineralogical Association of Canada in 1983. She was the first women named to the Johns Hopkins Society of Scholar. The mineral donnayite is named after her and Jose Donnay and the mineral species Gaidonnayite is named after her.
