= Peggy McKercher =

Canadian conservationist and academic

- Born: April 17, 1929 (age 97); Manitoba
- Occupations: University administrator and conservationist
- Spouse: Robert H. McKercher (died 2024)
- Children: 3

Peggy Wilton McKercher (born April 17, 1929) OC SOM, is a Canadian conservationist and university administrator.

McKercher was the first woman elected to the RM of Corman Park council; she served as the 11th chancellor of the University of Saskatchewan; she chaired the Meewasin Valley Authority in its formative years; she vice-chaired the Wanuskewin Heritage Park; she sat on the board of the National Capital Commission’s Canadiana Fund, the Saskatchewan Arts Board, and was as Saskatchewan's representative on the Trans Canada Trail Advisory Foundation Advisory Board. She also chaired the University of Saskatchewan Committee on Heritage Buildings and worked on the Mayor's South Down Town Task Force in Saskatoon. For her dynamic and effective leadership Mrs. McKercher has received both the Order of Canada and the Saskatchewan Order of Merit.

== Biography ==
McKercher was born in Manitoba on April 17, 1929. She attended City Park collegiate and enrolled at the University of Saskatchewan in 1947, graduating in 1950 with a Bachelor of Arts. Peggy remained at the university for two years working with the Physical Education staff, while her husband, Robert H. McKercher finished law school at the U of S. The couple then moved to Massachusetts where Robert completed a master's in Law at Harvard Law School and McKercher taught and supported him. The McKerchers then went to Toronto where Robert pursued a doctorate. They then returned to Saskatoon where Robert articled with Justice Emmett Hall, before joining a law firm in Ottawa for six years. The couple later returned to Saskatoon. McKercher was awarded the Spirit of Youth Award.

== Athletics ==
McKercher has been heavily involved in athletics all her life. During her time at the U of S she participated in eight University teams. Every team was either a city, provincial and/or intervarsity championship team. Her Huskie basketball team won the Cecil Race Trophy for three consecutive years, and her track and field team won the Rutherford Trophy three consecutive times as well. McKercher also participated on the university swim team. During her studies McKercher was a member of the Women's Athletic Board, and served as president from 1949 to 1950. McKercher was awarded the University of Saskatchewan Major Athletics Award in 1950 and inducted into the U of S Hall of Fame in 1984. Peggy has made considerable contribution through her work with the Jeux Canada Games Board of Directors and the ParticipACTION Board of Directors. There is an academic and athletic scholarship presented to students in honour of Peggy McKercher.

== Municipal politics, Meewasin Valley Authority, Wanuskewin and Community Service ==
McKercher was the first woman to serve on the rural municipality of RM of Corman Park council, where she sat as a division counselor, as deputy reeve, and on numerous committees. Mrs. McKercher has also chaired the Meewasin Valley Authority (MVA), and vice-chaired the Wanuskewin Heritage Park, which was developed and built by MVA. Mrs. McKercher was an important founding member of the Authority and was chair for 16 years from 1979 to 1995. McKercher was instrumental in the development of Wanuskewin Heritage Park near Saskatoon from 1982 until its official opening in 1992 and continued on its board until 1997.

McKercher dealt with a great deal of political resistance and disagreement over Wanuskewin. However, under her leadership, Meewasin created “one of the most beautiful riverfront areas in Canada”. McKercher served on the Canadian Water Resources Board, the National Capital Commission's Canadiana Fund, the Governor General's board for the Meritorious Service Decorations, and a fundraiser for the Sherbrooke Community Centre. and deputy reeve. She has served on the Saskatchewan Arts Board, and as the Saskatchewan representative on the Trans Canada Trail Foundation Advisory Board. She has also served on the Mayor's South Downtown Task Force, the Saskatchewan Medical Research Foundation, and the Saskatchewan Order of Merit advisory committee. McKercher is one of the Mendel Foundation Members,

== University of Saskatchewan Chancellorship, Order of Canada and Saskatchewan Order of Merit ==
McKercher served as the University of Saskatchewan's Chancellor for two terms, from 1995 until 2001. McKercher was praised for her “quiet dignity, gracious personality and sound wisdom” during her chancellorship, where she “served the University of Saskatchewan in ceremony, governance and everyday life in an outstanding manner”. As Chancellor, Mrs. McKercher acted as both a member and Chair of the University Senate and as a member of the Board of Governors. In March 1995 for her active volunteer work in the Saskatoon community and her “dynamic leadership [that] has helped strengthen the Authority's valuable work in preserving the Saskatchewan River Valley environment,” McKercher was invested in the Order of Canada.

== Other awards ==
In 1989, McKercher received the Saskatoon Citizen of the Year award. McKercher has been awarded also the Rosalie Early Memorial Award, the Governor General's Canada 125 Award, the Ernst and Young, Bank of Montreal Award for Socially Responsible Entrepreneur of the Year, Western Canada for 1994. On May 29, 2002, McKercher was presented an honorary Doctor of Laws by Peter MacKinnon, President of the U of S.

== Notes ==
Academic offices
Preceded by E. K. Turner	Chancellor of the University of Saskatchewan; 1995–2001	Succeeded by W. Thomas Molloy
