= Athabasca University =

Distance education university in Alberta, Canada

Coordinates: 54°43′20.63″N 113°18′12.19″W

- Other name: AU
- Motto: Learning for Life
- Type: Public university specializing in online distance education
- Established: 1970
- Affiliations: ACU; CVU; MSCHE; UArctic; Universities Canada
- President: Alex Clark
- Students: 9,207 (2023-24 fulltime equivalent)
- Undergraduates: 35,520
- Postgraduates: 5,110
- Location: Athabasca, Alberta, Canada
- Campus: Online, rural and urban
- Faculty & Staff: 1,233
Colours
Orange and Blue
- Website: www.athabascau.ca

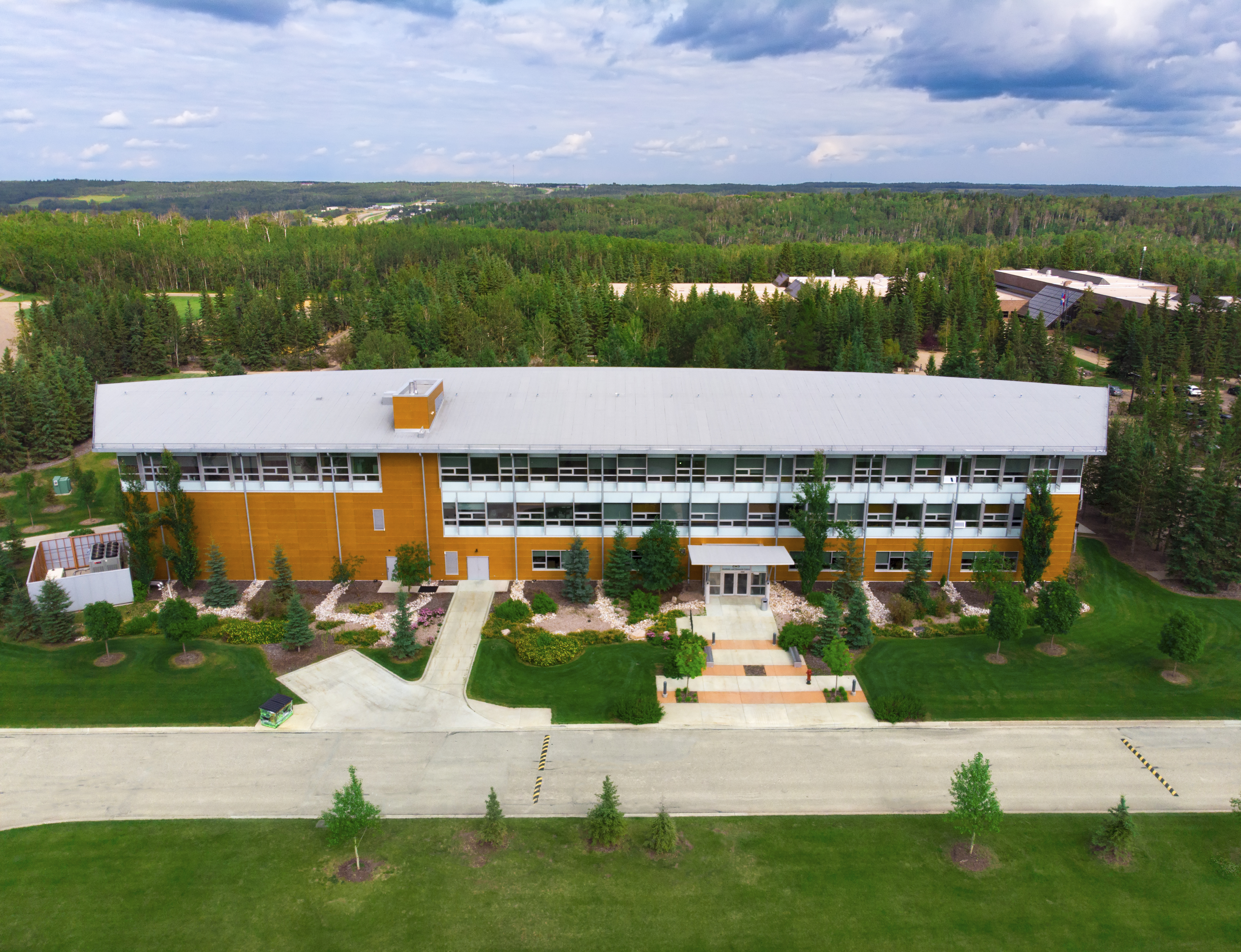
Aerial view of the Academic & Research Center at Athabasca University

Athabasca University (AU) is a Canadian public university that primarily operates through online distance education. Founded in 1970, it is one of four comprehensive academic and research universities in Alberta, and was the first Canadian university to specialize in distance education.

== History ==
In 1967, the Manning government announced its intention to establish a fourth public university, but this would be delayed by three years as the government considered different proposals. The U of A wanted to expand rather than see another university open in Edmonton to compete with it. One proposal favoured establishing a Christian university instead of a secular one. Another early suggestion was an "Alberta academy" that would take credits students had earned at multiple universities, evaluate them for transfer, and perhaps award degrees. A Department of Education ad hoc group favoured the establishment of a fourth public university.

Athabasca University was created by the Alberta government in 1970 as part of an expansion of higher education to cope with rising enrolment at the time. A group of U of A graduates including Preston Manning influenced the development. In 1970, Grant MacEwan, then the Lieutenant Governor of Alberta, established AU by an Order in Council. The name for the new university was a challenge, as it was not desired to associate the new university with a city (Edmonton) that already had a university (the U of A). Athabasca Hall, a student residence at the U of A, was scheduled for demolition, so the name was appropriated for the new Athabasca University.

The initial mandate for Athabasca University dictated that AU be primarily undergraduate in scope. Creating new procedures for curriculum development was also part of the mandate.

=== First president and early years ===
In April 1971, Timothy C. Byrne was appointed the first president of Athabasca University, and he assumed office in June that year.

The initial governing authority of the university had eight members as well as a broad range of powers to set up the new university. On 2–3 July 1970, they met for the first time, and Carl W. Clement was the first chair. It was expected by the government of the day that AU would have 10,000 students by 1979. 1 September 1973, was set as the target date to open.

The AU administration chose the University of California, Santa Cruz, as its model, deciding that individual colleges should serve as the basic planning units for the new university, which would be organized as a federation of colleges. Each of the colleges was to have 650 students with corresponding lecture and office space. The learning approach would have students in small tutorials instead of large lectures. Research within the new university was to be limited to a specified region around the city of Edmonton. One criticism was that the university was trying to do too much.

The government of Peter Lougheed in 1971 brought changes, including a cabinet portfolio specifically for post-secondary education. The newly elected Conservative government was opposed to building a new university in Edmonton, but architectural plans were permitted to continue. A proposal was made to the government to test the new model for three to five years, and if it succeeded, AU would become a fully independent university. This happened under Chair Merrill Wolfe. The proposal was accepted by the government.

In the summer of 1972, the new deputy minister of Alberta Advanced Education stated there was a demand for lifelong continuing education. There was also a need for an "Alberta academy" that would evaluate university courses taken at multiple institutions and award degrees based on its evaluations. Meanwhile, AU also proposed to serve part-time students and made the case that this would not affect the traditional universities already established in Alberta or the new approach of AU. An open-door academic policy removing most traditional university admission requirements was part of AU's proposal.

In 1972, a new Order in Council was issued to include only a new pilot project for distance education.

=== Piloting distance education ===
Trial and error characterized the pilot period, as there was no similar model to follow for the mandate Athabasca University was given. In 1973, AU began to advertise for students to help with course development. World Ecology was the first course and the core of the pilot project. In-house production of the learning packages for courses was important to the staff, so the university developed its own printing process.

Contrary to much current belief, Athabasca University was not modelled after the Open University, but was developed in its present form during the pilot project. AU became aware of what the Open University was doing when, during the final year of the project, a representative went to Milton Keynes to discover any methods its staff might have devised to speed up production.

In 1975, plans came together to reach out to students through field services tutors and regional learning resource centres. In 1976, the first part-time telephone tutors were appointed, 24 in total. The tutor role was to facilitate learning, not to teach the course. Tutors were assigned blocks of between 20 and 40 students each, and AU provided toll-free phone numbers that students used for contacting the tutors. All tutors were (and are still) required to have at least a master's degree.

An early test project for a learning resource centre had books and tapes relevant to the courses available at branches of public libraries throughout Alberta. Although the libraries were keen on the idea, students preferred to remain in their homes to learn. By 1975, the median age was between 35 and 40, and there were 725 students. A minority of students had only completed Grade 9.

Inviting students to register in a course and then forcing them to wait an unconscionable length of time for delivery of units was obviously not a way to establish a reputation as a reliable institution.

In 1975, at the end of the pilot project, an agency was appointed to evaluate its success. A recommendation was made to the Alberta government that the university be made a permanent member of the province's university system. It was also to remain an open university. Under the chairmanship of Edward Checkland, the university gained permanency.

In 1976, Sam Smith took over as president, and the university's permanency was established through an act of the Legislature of Alberta.

=== Collaborations ===
The first collaboration the university embarked on was with Keyano College, which eventually led to the opening of a regional learning office in Fort McMurray, Alberta. (This regional office would later close.) In 1976, North Island College took on the challenge of delivering many of AU's courses on its many campuses.

In the mid-seventies, two young Canadians, one of whom was the son of a prominent Edmonton family, were indicted in an English court for attempting to smuggle drugs into the country. They were each sentenced to a lengthy prison term and incarcerated in one of England's most infamous prisons. Each registered in one of Athabasca University's first three courses, becoming the first two in a long list of prison inmates to join its student body.

In 1984, AU moved its main campus in Edmonton 145 kilometres (90 miles) north to Athabasca. The main campus remains in Athabasca, and there are satellite locations in Calgary, Edmonton and St. Albert.

In 1985, AU reached an agreement with the Correctional Service of Canada for the payment of tuition and program delivery fees for federal inmates taking courses through the university.

In 1994, AU's Centre for Innovative Management introduced the world's first online MBA program, also the first graduate program at the university. The program had 65 students in its first year, and to date there have been almost 4,000 graduates from the online MBA program. Under the leadership of university president Dominique Abrioux (1995–2005), Athabasca expanded programs in all faculties, including graduate studies, with a new MA in Integrated Studies called MA-IS.

==== Amazon Web Services ====
Athabasca University is the first Canadian post-secondary institution to enter into a formal collaboration with Amazon Web Services, Inc. (AWS). This collaboration modernizes AU's IT infrastructure and the two organizations will also be designing, implementing, and managing cloud education programs, artificial intelligence and machine learning initiatives, and research-based applications for the education sector.

==== Professional Hockey Players' Association (PHPA) ====
Partnering with the PHPA, members of the association have access to online courses that they can complete through Athabasca University.

=== Coates Report ===
Facing financial pressures in 2015, Athabasca University underwent an independent third-party review to report to ascertain long-term solutions. The report found that there was a significant student demand for flexible, online post-secondary options, but that Athabasca University needed a clear and shared vision for the future.

== Education delivery models ==
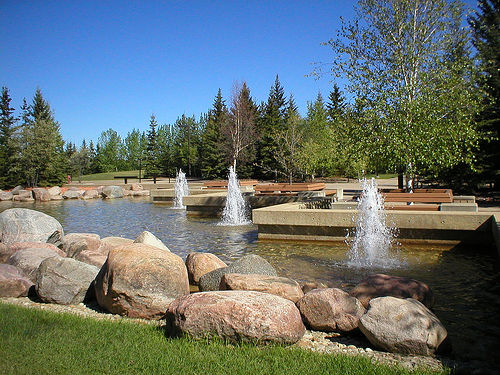
Water fountains at the main campus at Athabasca, Alberta

The majority of Athabasca University's courses are taught through online distance education, but some courses or components of courses are taught in-person, face to face. The major education delivery models at AU are as follows:

- Individual study: Students are provided with the textbooks, computer software, and video material required. A preset recommended schedule comes with each course. Each course has a professor, as with any university course. This person publishes a series of learning activities, readings and assessments. That publication becomes additional reading and activity for the student. Assignments are submitted to the professor via email or more commonly via the Moodle assignment drop box. The final exam is administered at Athabasca's learning centres or a partner university, college or accredited individual. Students have up to six months to finish their course, unless they have received a student loan, in which case, they have up to four months. Courses start at the beginning of each month. Most courses are now augmented with additional resources and activities using the Moodle LMS
- Collaborative, online: Courses in the graduate programs are paced, usually beginning three times a year. The primary delivery platform is the Moodle Learning Management System, that is augmented by web conferencing using Adobe Connect and social networking using elgg-based Athabasca Landing
- Grouped study: Offered primarily to students physically in Alberta, this method allows students to get together with other students in the same course, and study in a manner similar to that of a regular university. Students studying in this method have up to four months to complete their course. Courses start in September and January.

=== Centre for Distance Education ===
In addition to delivering courses and programs primarily through online distance education, Athabasca University has a Centre for Distance Education (CDE). Since 2019, the CDE has existed in name only, and its staff and programs are now part of the Faculty of Humanities & Social Sciences (FHSS). The former CDE, led by a core faculty and supported by additional sessional instructors, offered graduate-level courses and programs that taught other educators how to develop, design and deliver online education. The CDE was home to North America's first online Doctor of Education in Distance Education, and it also offered a Master of Education in Distance Education and post-baccalaureate certificates and diplomas in distance education technology, instructional design, and technology-based learning. These programs and associated teaching methods continue to thrive in the FHSS.

=== Distance education research ===
AU also sponsors the publication of the International Review of Research in Open and Distance Learning, which is listed in the Social Sciences Citation Index and is a well-known and frequently cited scholarly journal in the field of distance and open education.

== Accreditation ==
Athabasca University reports to the government through the Minister of Advanced Education and is publicly funded through the Province of Alberta. The university's governing council is authorized to grant degrees through the Post-Secondary Learning Act along with governing its own affairs. Members of the governing council are appointed by the Lieutenant Governor in council.

Under the Post-Secondary Learning Act, Athabasca University is considered a "Comprehensive Academic and Research University" (CARUs). CARUs offer a range of academic and professional programs, which generally lead to undergraduate and graduate-level credentials and have a strong research focus.

The university was accredited with the United States by the Commission on Higher Education of the Middle States Commission on Higher Education from 2002 - 2025. It surrendered its accreditation on 31 March 2025.

=== Select memberships ===
- Association of Universities and Colleges of Canada
- Association of Commonwealth Universities
- Canadian Association for Graduate Studies
- Canadian Virtual University
- International Council for Open and Distance Education
- International Association of Universities
- University of the Arctic
- Organization of American States (OAS) Consortium of Universities.

== Academics ==
AU is Canada's only exclusively open university, and Maclean's Magazine called it Canada's fastest growing university. 50% of AU's students are between the ages of 25 and 44, and admissions are year-round. AU hosts four Canada Research Chairs, with an additional one allocated in 2019.

=== Research ===
AU has five faculties: College of Business, College of Health Disciplines, College of Humanities and Social Sciences, College of Science and Technology and College of Graduate Studies. AU spends over $2 million per year on research. The university has four Canada Research Chairs, one NSERC/Xerox/Markin/ICORE Research Chair and one of three UNESCO/COL Chairs. The Athabasca University Research Centre is the primary centre at the university, along with the Technology Enhanced Knowledge Research Institute and the Centre for World Indigenous Knowledge and Research. AU is also a participating member of the WestGrid Research Network.

=== Notable faculty ===
- Martin Connors, Canada Research Chair, space science, discovered a Trojan asteroid associated with planet Earth (2011)
- Joseph Pivato, professor of Comparative Literature who published eleven books on Canadian authors and ethnic minority writing.
- Tracey Lindberg, Canada Research Chair, indigenous knowledge and law, many publications on social and legal questions
- George Siemens, adjunct professor, distance education, theorist in distance education, creator of the theory of Connectivism, leader in learning analytics
- Terry Anderson, Emeritus Professor and former Canada Research Chair, distance education, theorist in distance education, author of six books and hundreds of articles in the field, well known for his work on the Community of Inquiry model, social media and education, and his Interaction Equivalency Theorem.

== Scholarships and bursaries ==
The Government of Canada sponsors an Aboriginal Bursaries Search Tool that lists over 680 scholarships, bursaries, and other incentives offered by governments, universities, and industry to support Aboriginal post-secondary participation. Athabasca University bursaries for Aboriginal, First Nations and Métis students include: Alberta Historical Resources Foundation; Syncrude Canada Ltd./Athabasca University Aboriginal Scholarship; Frank and Agnes Cardinal Neheyiwak Bursary; Harold Cardinal Essay Prize for Aboriginal Students; Canative Scholarship for Métis Students; AU President's Scholarship for a Blue Quills Student; First Peoples Technology Bursary In addition, people with disabilities and International students have access to these bursaries and scholarships.

== Notable people ==
Some notable people have studied through Athabasca University, including Alberta politician Debby Carlson, Olympic bobsleigh racer Christian Farstad, former Alberta Premier Ralph Klein, professional hockey player Alyn McCauley, and cross-country skier Milaine Thériault. AU serves over 38,000 students (over 7,900 full-load equivalents) and offers over 900 courses in more than 50 undergraduate and graduate programs in a range of arts, science and professional disciplines.

== Controversy ==
In 2012, it was revealed that Athabasca University was among the institutions of higher education involved in illegal donations to the provincial Progressive Conservative Party of Alberta. The university spent $10,675 on Conservative fundraising events, including golf tournaments and dinners. The university president retired early, and an interim president, Peter MacKinnon, was appointed by the university governing council.

== Student representation ==
=== Undergraduate students ===
Undergraduate students at Athabasca University are represented by the Athabasca University Students' Union. The AUSU head office is in AU Edmonton, though the students' council may have elected members from any area where AU students reside.

AUSU was officially incorporated as of 16 July 1992, and was formalized as a registered Alberta society until students' unions in Alberta were granted recognition under the Post-Secondary Learning Act. On 13 September 2004 the Lieutenant Governor of Alberta approved an order in council establishing "The Students' Association of Athabasca University".

AUSU offers services to its members, including but not limited to an optional health & dental plan, student awards, a free subscription to LinkedIn Learning, student advocacy, and Athabasca University course evaluations. Student media at Athabasca University is provided by the official publication The Voice Magazine. Previously published on paper, the magazine since 2001 is published exclusively online in HTML and PDF format.

=== Graduate students ===
Visiting and program students at the graduate level are represented by the Athabasca University Graduate Students' Association. The organization was founded in 2010, and approved by the Alberta Advanced Education.

== Arms ==
Coat of arms of Athabasca University
Notes Granted 15 August 2011 Crest A demi-bear Azure holding the mace of Athabasca University Proper. Escutcheon Azure on a Canadian pale Argent a pile reversed throughout Vert. Supporters Two hawks Azure beaked and membered Argent standing on a grassy mount Vert set with poplar leaves Or. Motto Learning For Life

== See also ==
- Higher education in Alberta
- List of universities in Canada
