= Manitoba Pool Elevators =

Grain agriculture cooperative

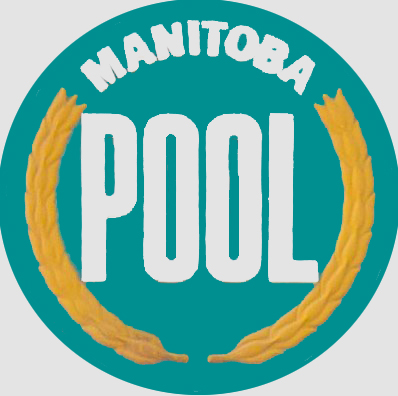
- Industry: Agriculture
- Founded: 1924
- Defunct: 1998
- Fate: Merged
- Successor: Agricore, Agricore United, Viterra
- Headquarters: Manitoba, Canada
- Products: Grain buying

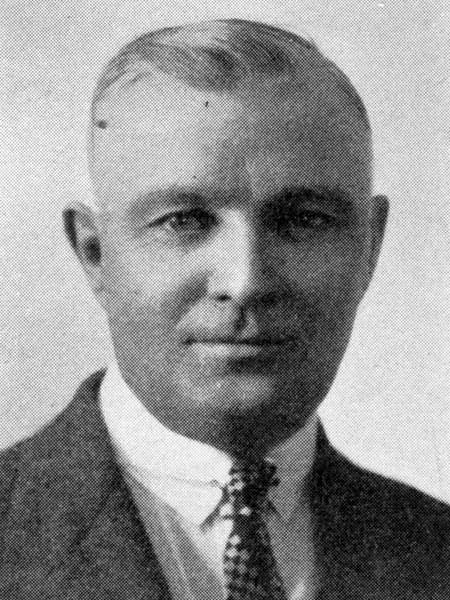
Colin H. Burnell (1880-1946), Manitoba farmer, member of the Manitoba Grain Growers’ Association, president of the United Farmers of Manitoba, president of the Manitoba Wheat Pool, president of Manitoba Pool Elevators

Manitoba Pool Elevators was a grain trade company founded in 1924. It became a subsidiary of the Saskatchewan Wheat Pool until November 1932, when the Pool declared bankruptcy. In 1998 Alberta Wheat Pool and Manitoba Pool Elevators merged to form Agricore Cooperative Limited. In 2001, United Grain Growers combined its business operations with Agricore Cooperative Ltd. and carried on business as Agricore United, a publicly traded company, no longer a farmer-owned cooperative. In 2007, Agricore United was taken over by the Saskatchewan Wheat Pool, another publicly traded company. The merged corporation was renamed Viterra.

== Gallery ==
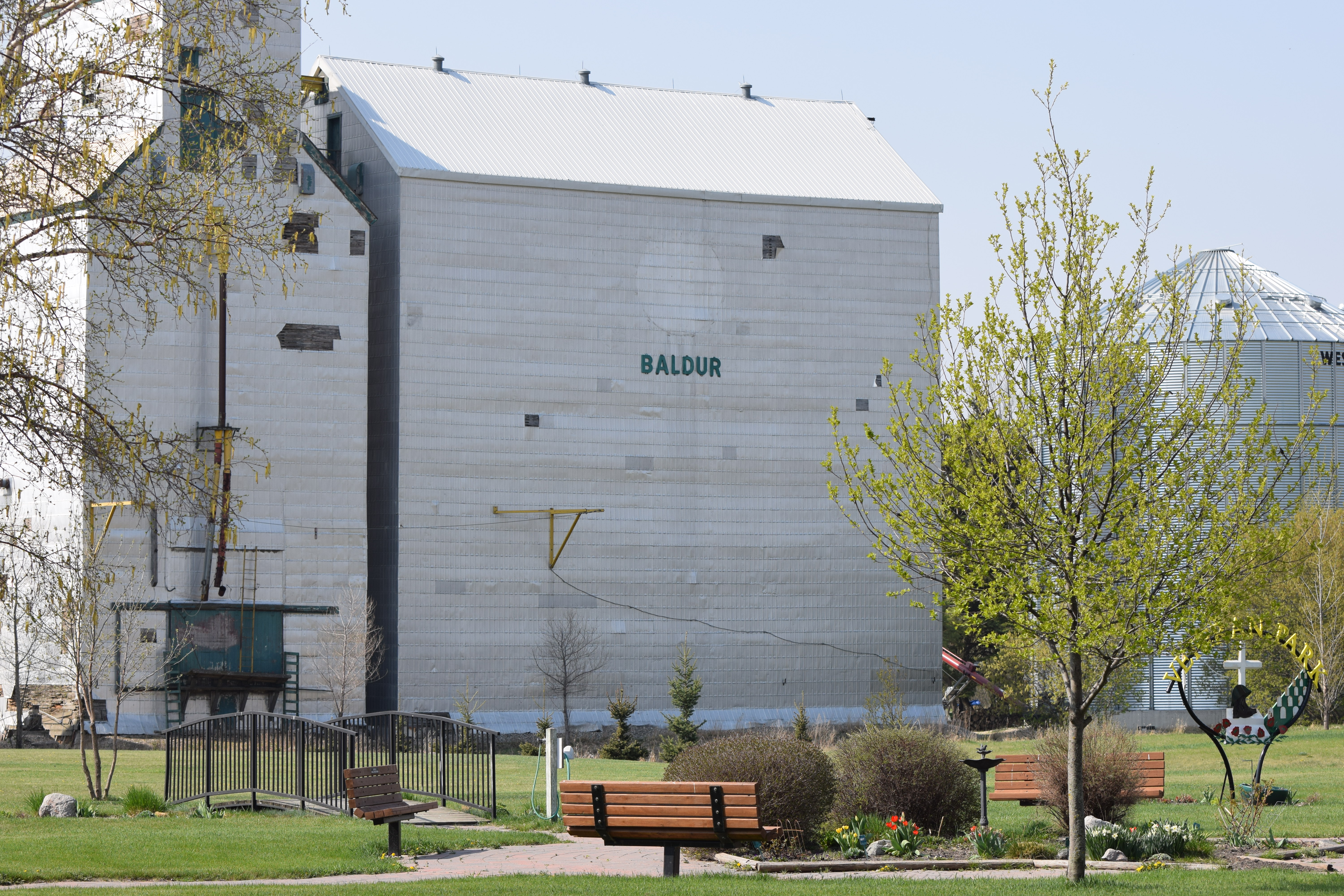
Baldur

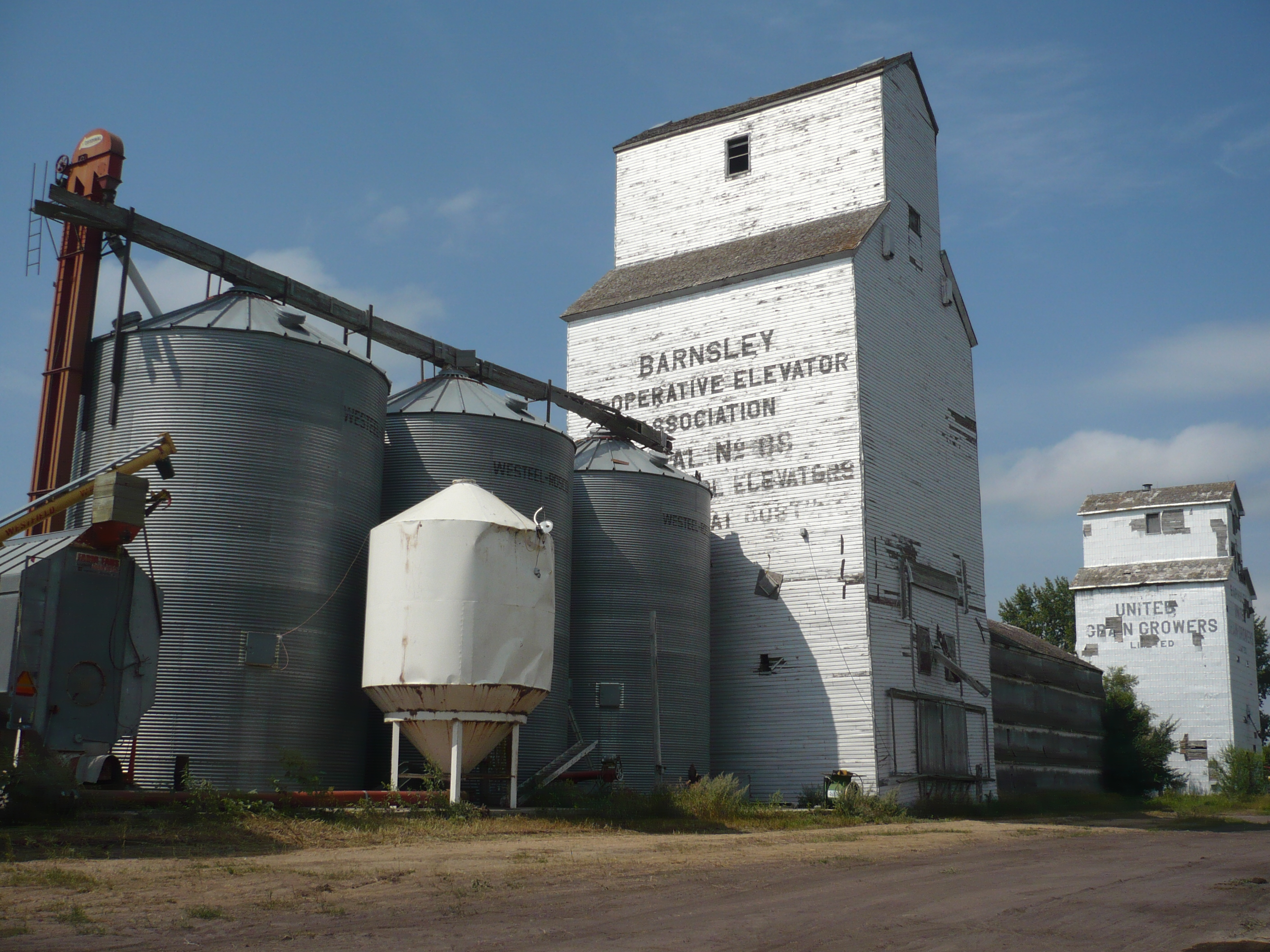
Barnsley

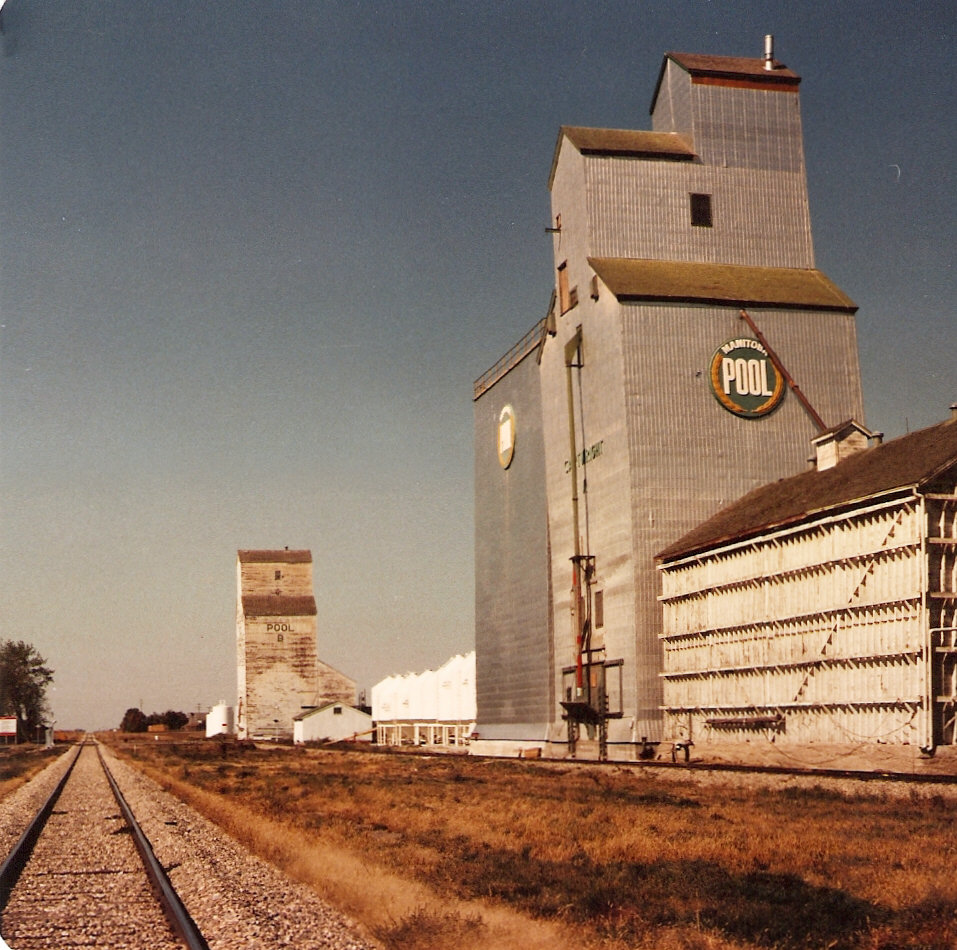
Cartwright, Manitoba Pool and Federal Elevator, 1985

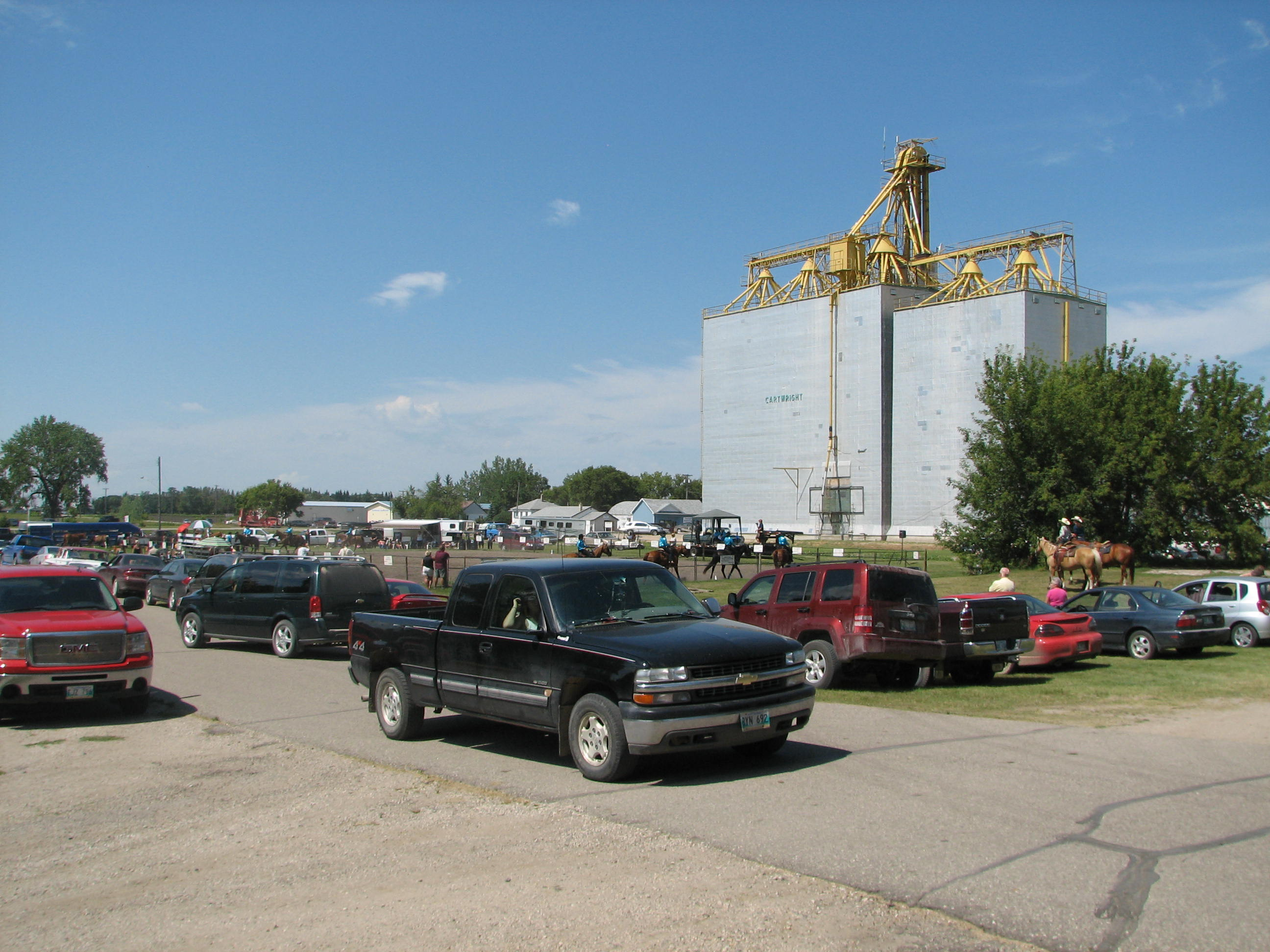
Cartwright, 2010

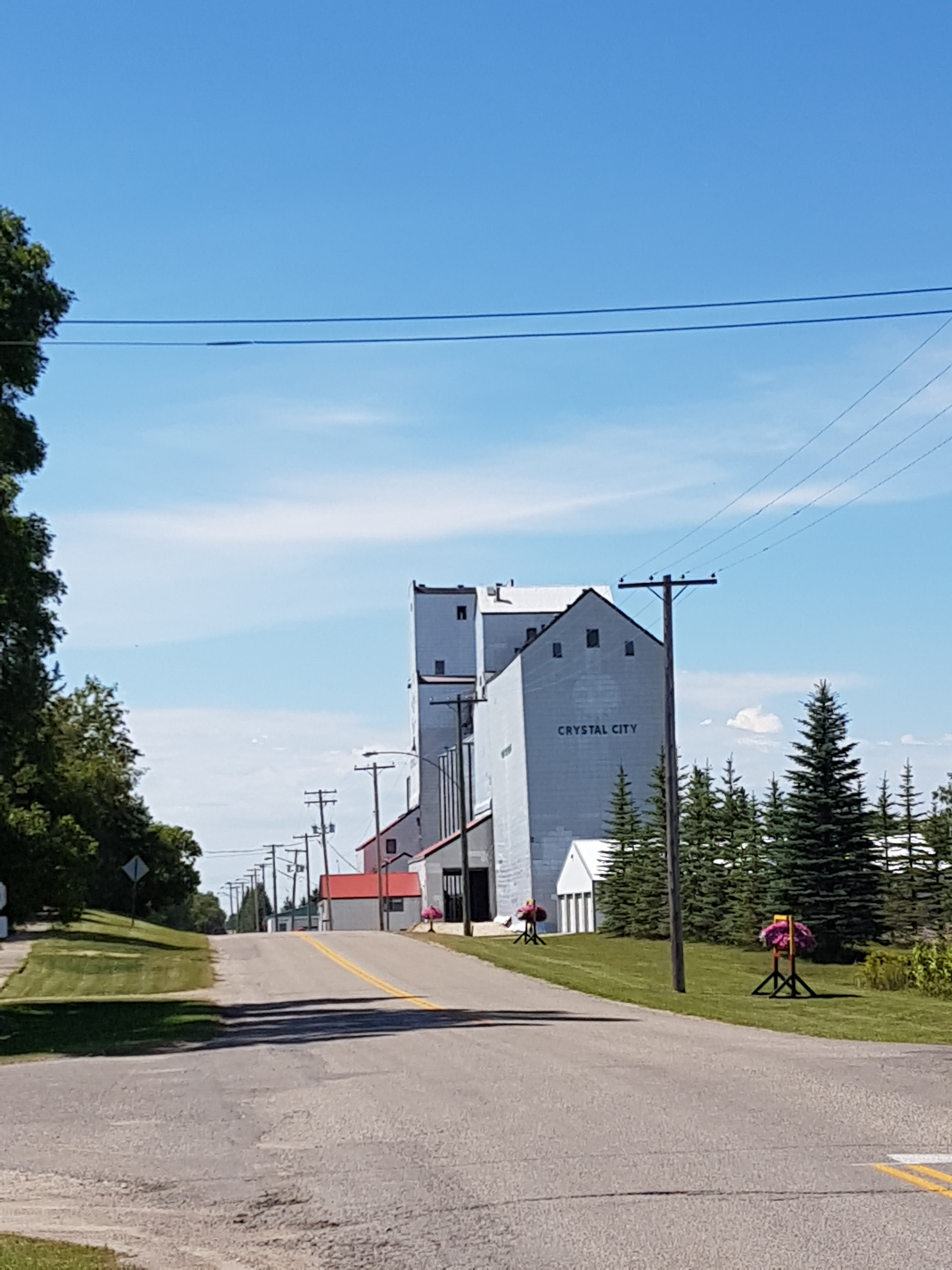
Crystal City

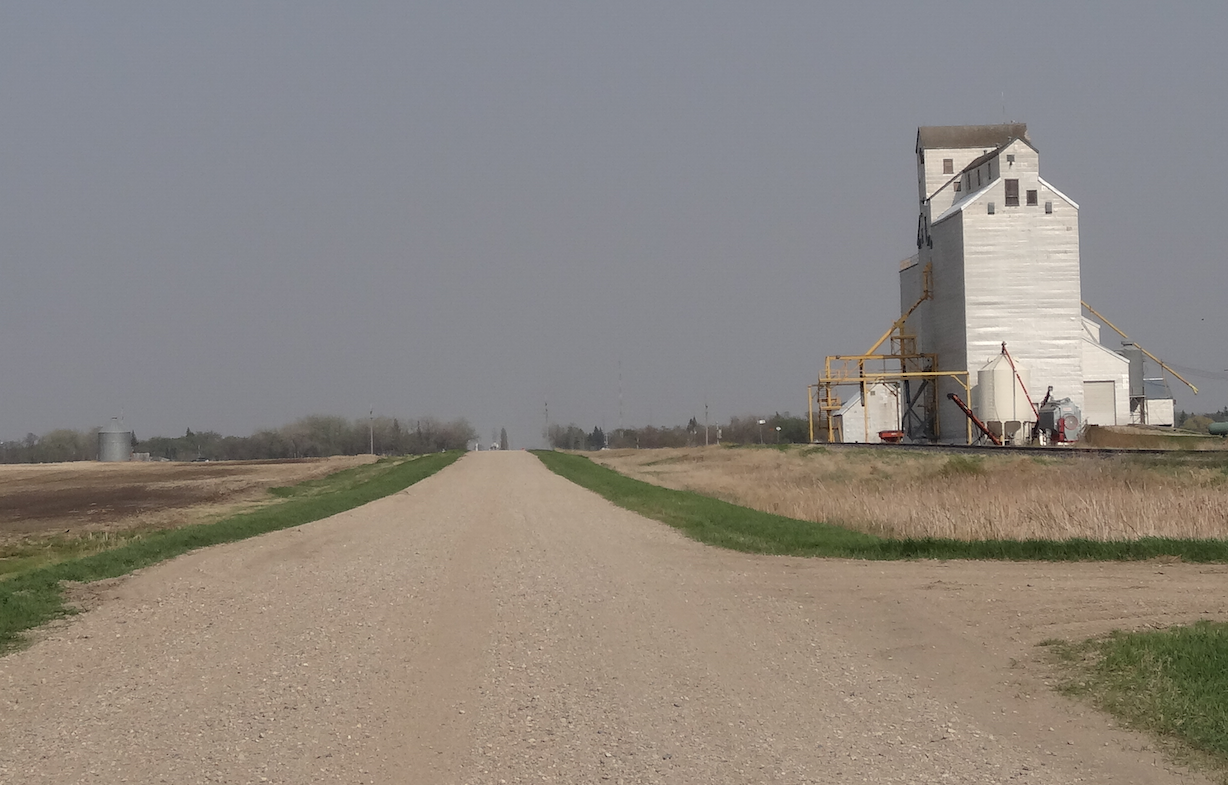
Deloraine

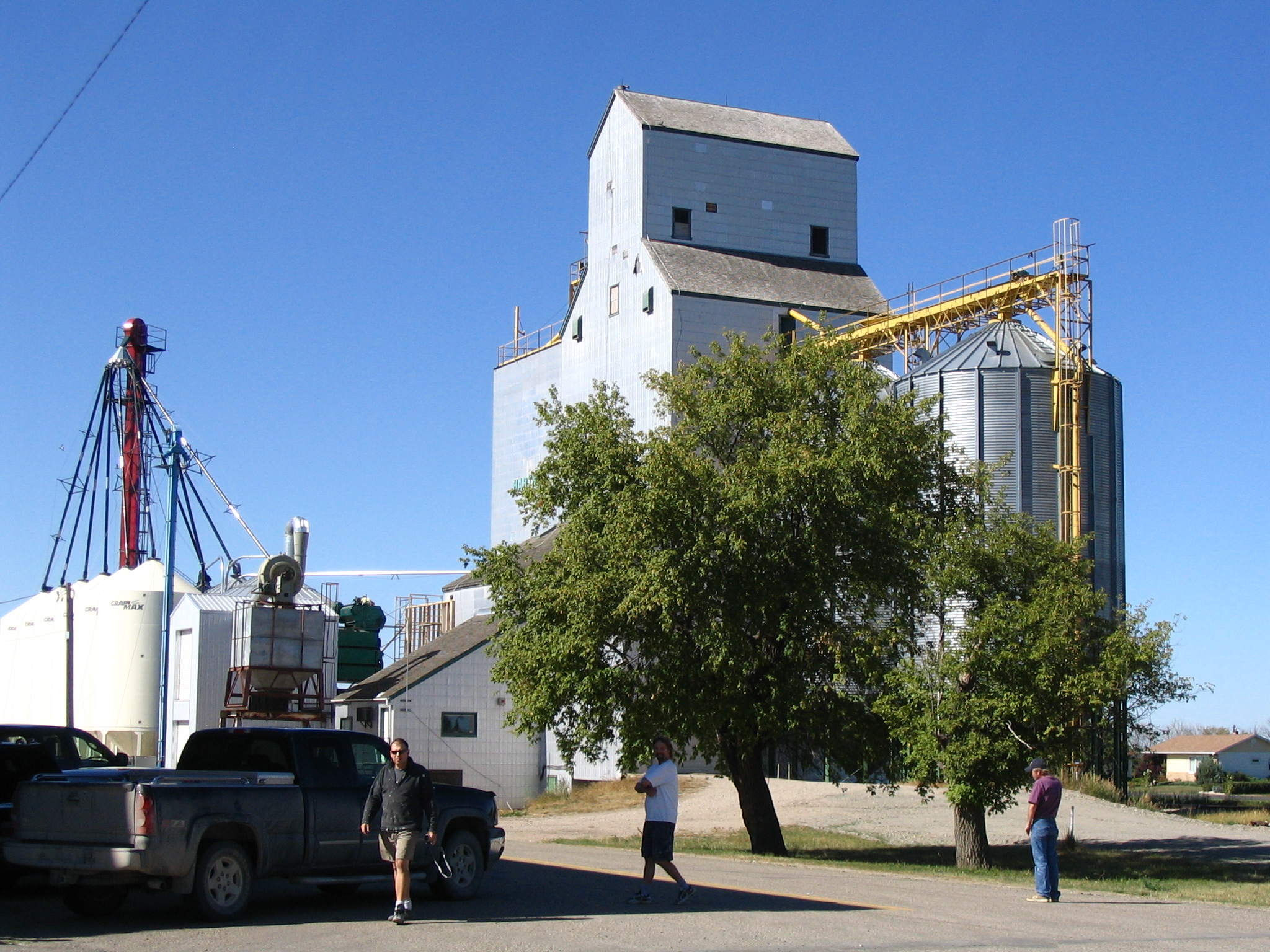
Hartney

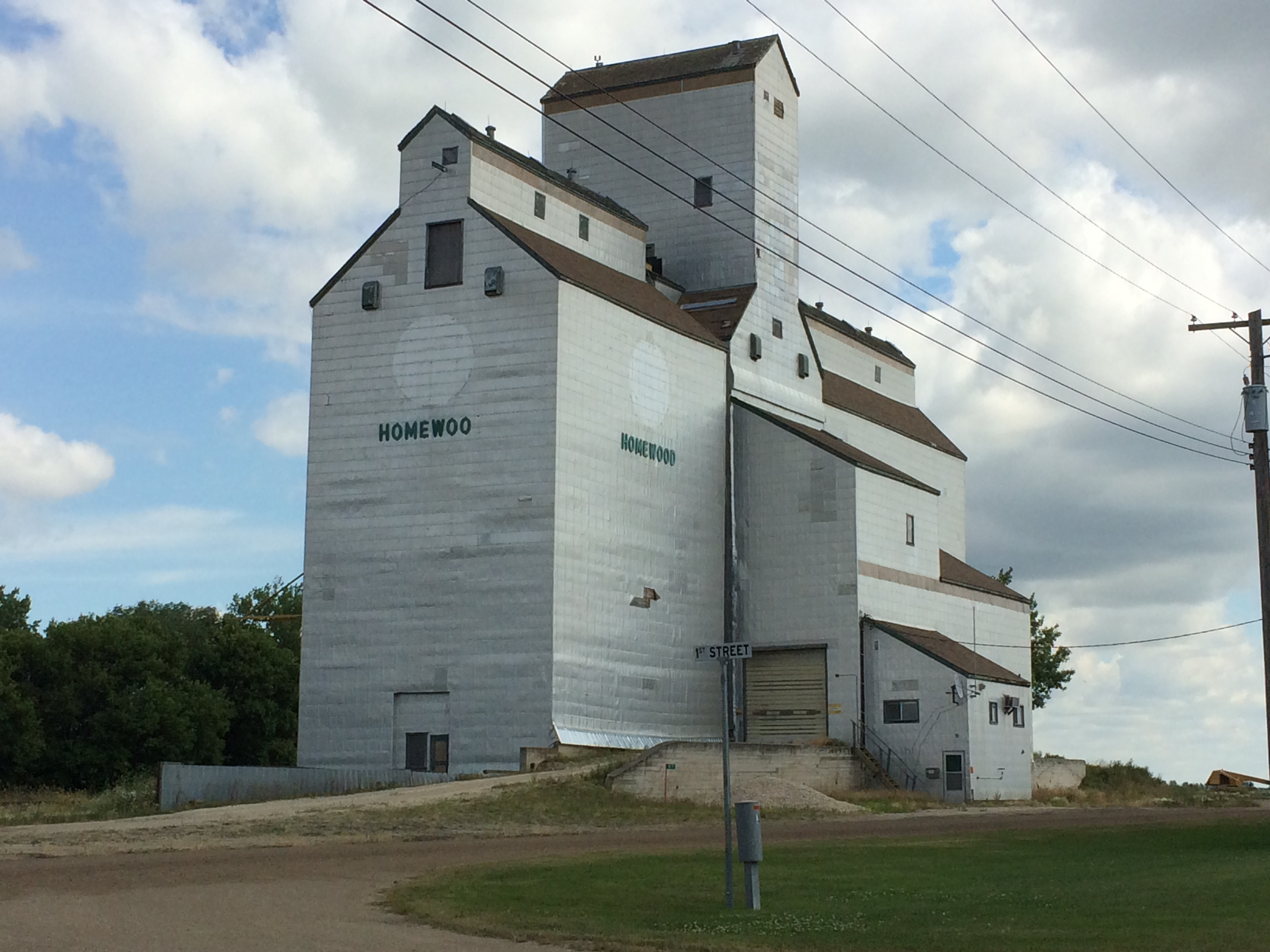
Homewood

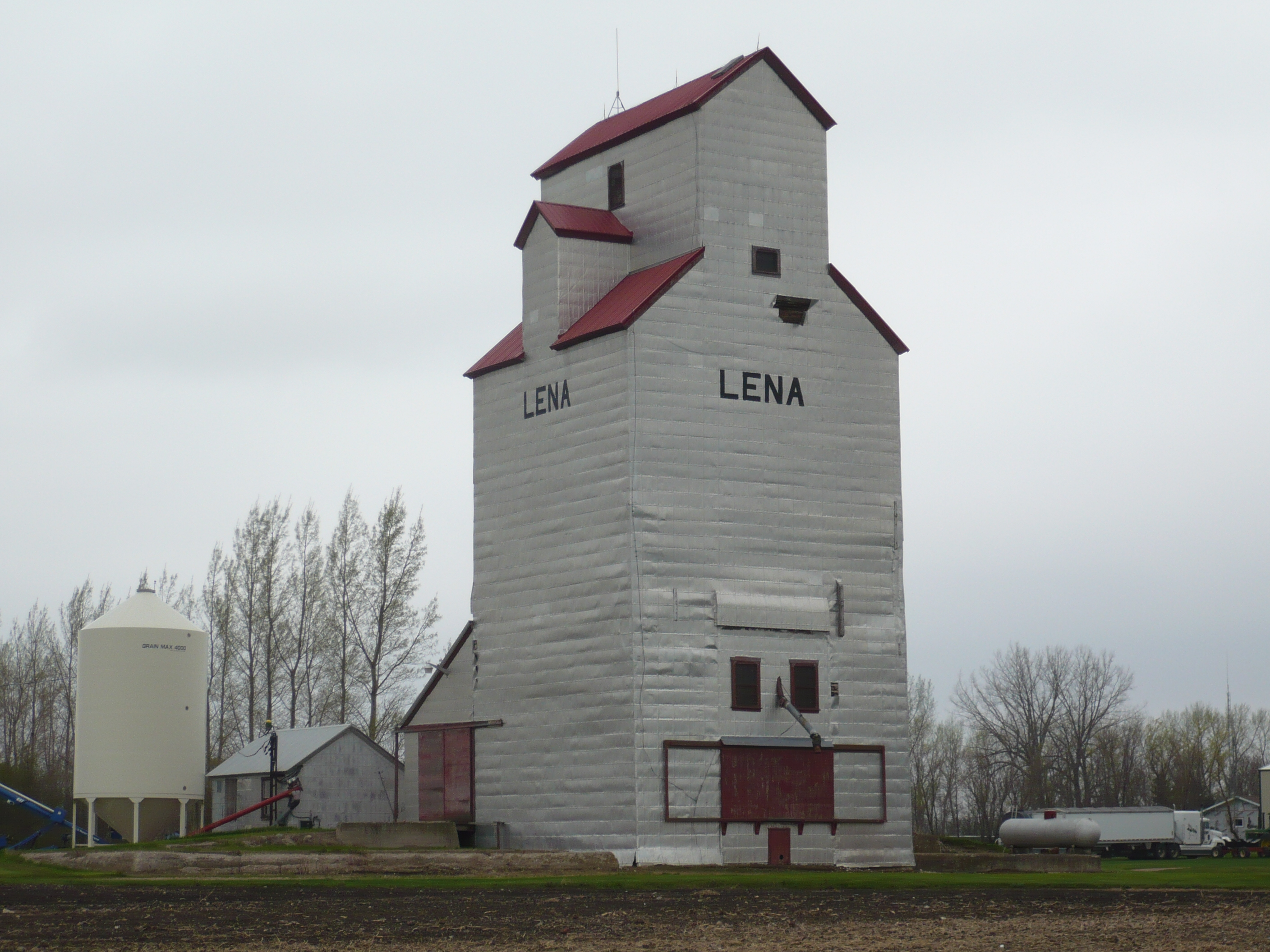
Lena

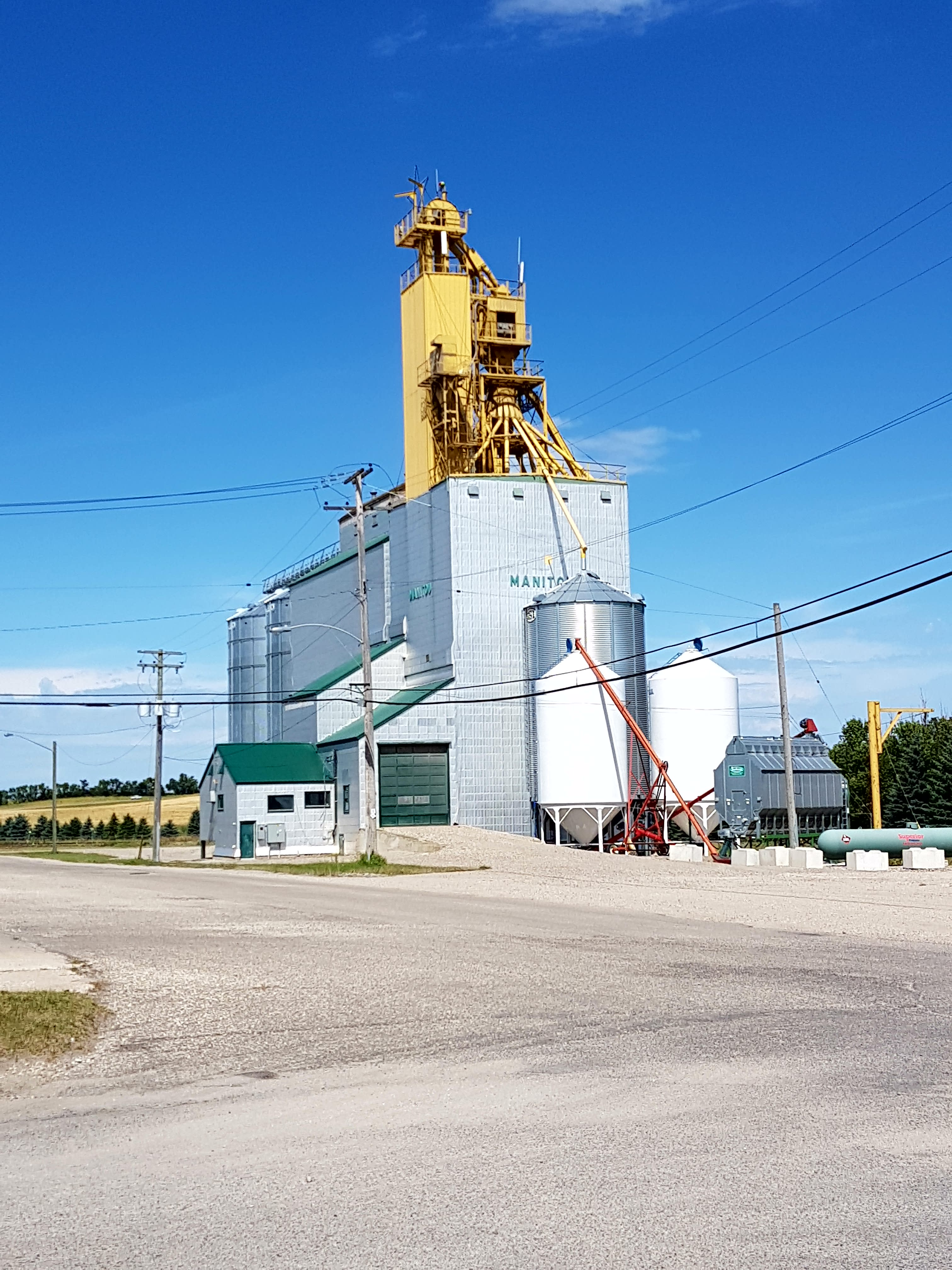
Manitou

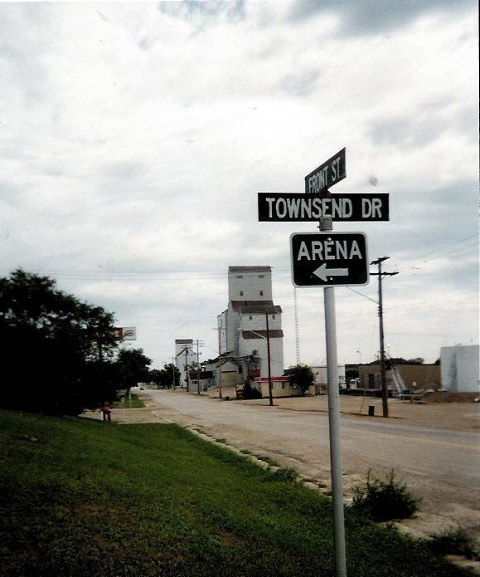
Melita

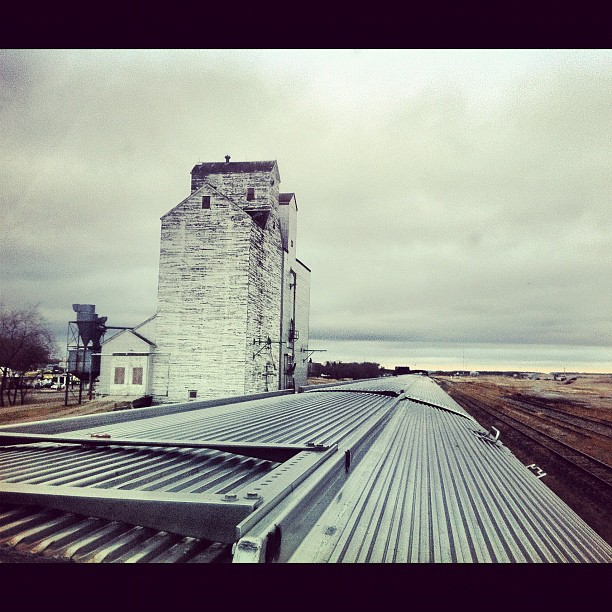
Rivers former Cargill, taken over by MPE

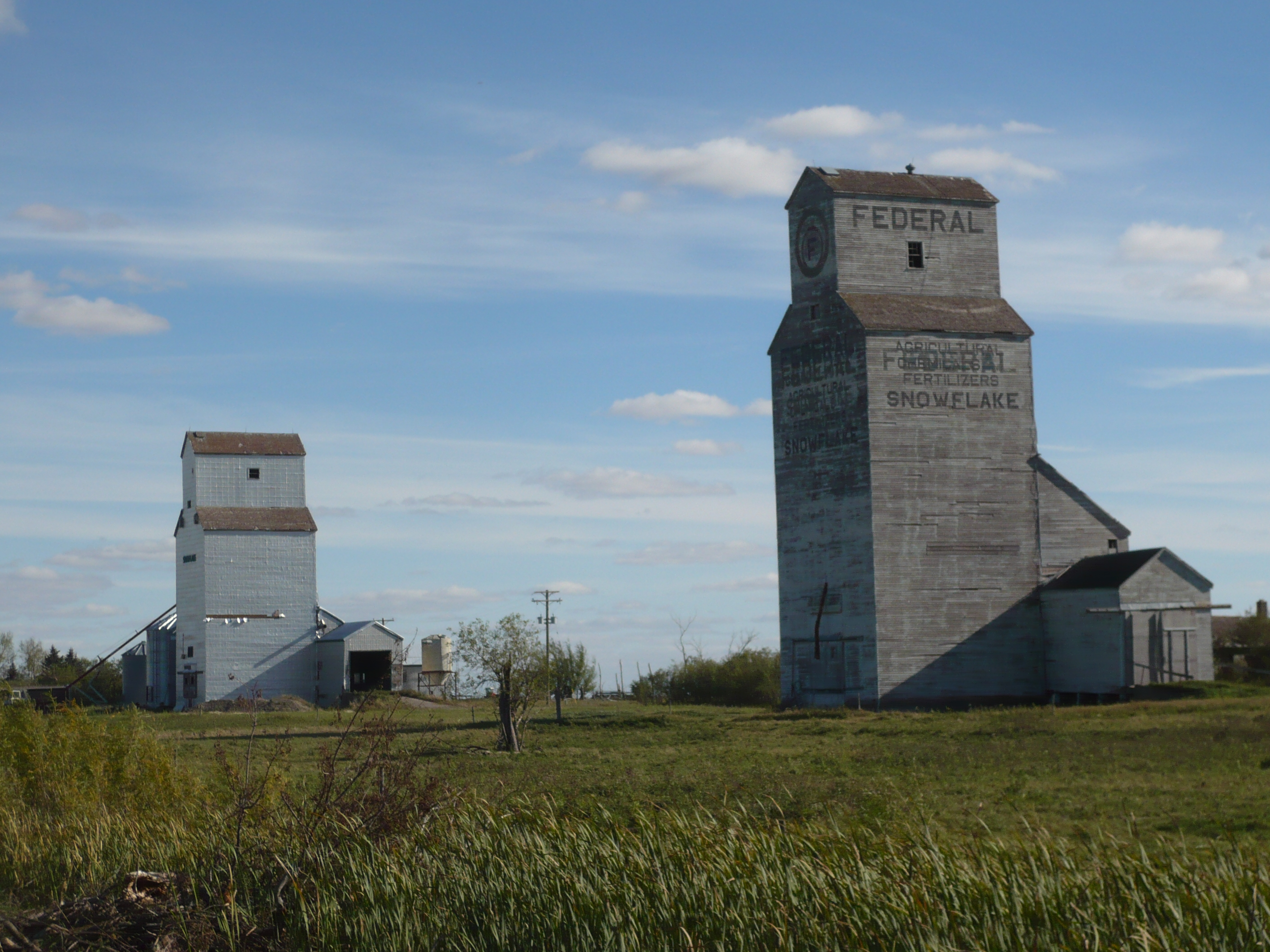
Snowflake

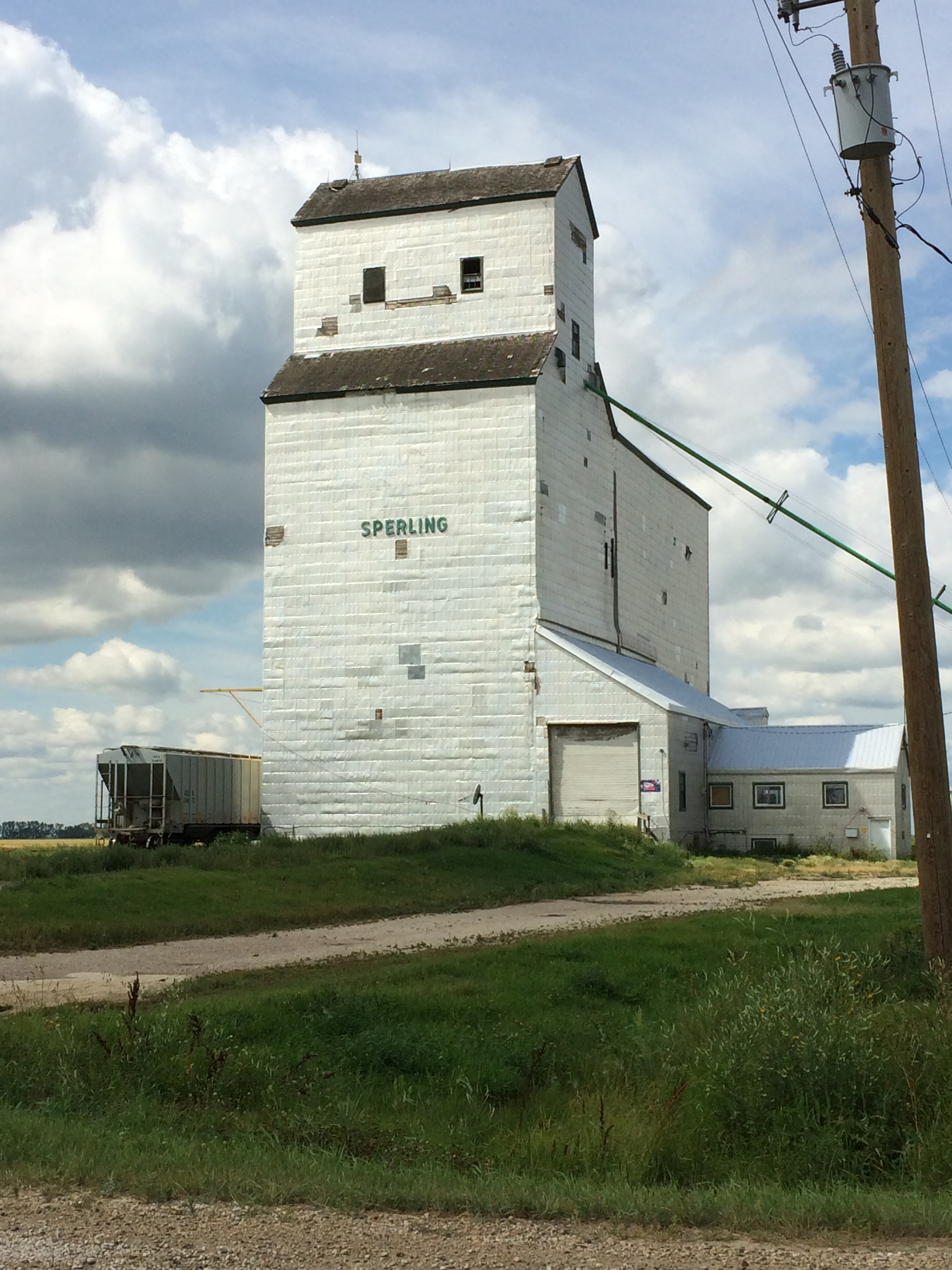
Sperling(Demolished)

== See also ==
- Wheat pool
- Alberta Wheat Pool
- Agricore United
- Saskatchewan Wheat Pool
- United Grain Growers
- Viterra
- List of Canadian Heritage Wheat Varieties
