= Wheat pools in Canada =

Agricultural cooperatives in Canada

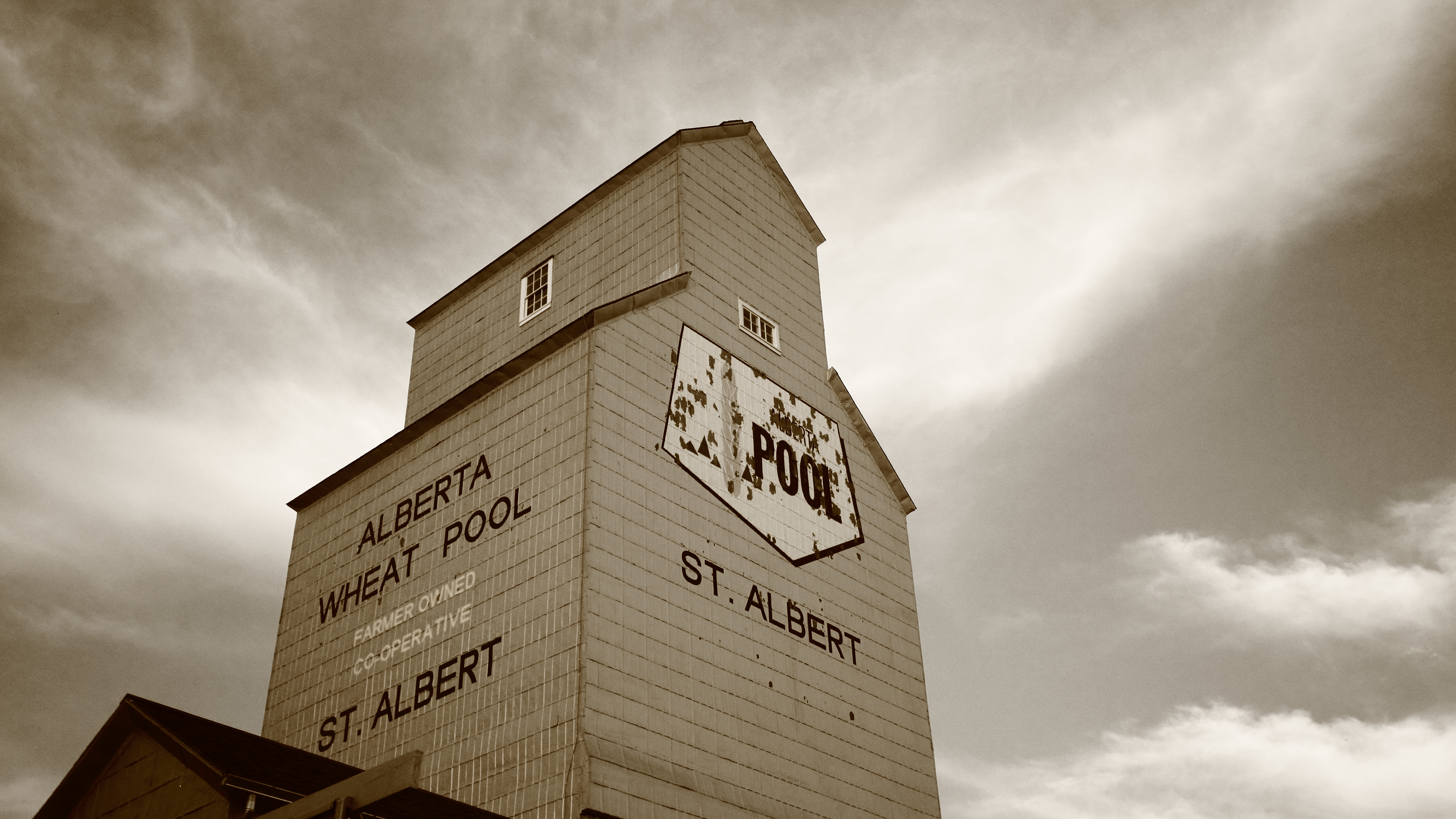
Old wheat pool grain elevator in Alberta, Canada

A wheat pool is an agricultural cooperative that markets grain (mostly wheat) on behalf of its farmer-members.

In Canada in 1923 and 1924, three wheat pools were created. They were farmer-owned co-operatives, created to break the power of the large for-profit corporations, that had dominated the grain trade in Western Canada since the late 19th Century, and were an early source of Western alienation.

The wheat pools were successful grain traders and marketers from 1923 to 1929. During the Great Depression, however, huge losses forced them out of the grain marketing business. They persisted as grain elevator operators but after 1935 all grain marketing in Canada shifted to a new government agency, Canadian Wheat Board.

During the post-war era, the wheat pools almost completely replaced the private grain companies as elevator operators. By the 1990s, however, most had demutualized (privatized), and several mergers occurred. Now all the former wheat pools are part of the Viterra corporation, which itself was acquired by Glencore Xstrata in 2013.

== Background ==
=== Agrarian activism ===
The pools were the culmination of a long tradition of agrarian activism dating back decades in the Prairie Provinces of Canada which peaked in the 1920s. One notable date was the founding of the Territorial Grain Growers Association (T.G.G.A.) in 1901. The T.G.G.A.'s successor organizations would be important organizers in the later campaigning to organize the wheat pools. The co-operative movement was also being established in Canada at this time.

=== Farmer grievances ===
At this time farmers in the Prairie Provinces were deeply alienated from the Canadian political and economic status quo. Farmers accepted as common knowledge that grain companies, railways, banks, and the government were part of a system that sought to exploit and oppress farmers. They developed a class solidarity and a fear and loathing of the ruling elite.

Specifically they despised the private grain trade system as symbolized by Winnipeg Grain Exchange. Farmers suspected the grain traders of being middle men who only profited by leeching off the efforts of farmers without adding any value. They were especially angered by the practice of hedging that private traders used on the futures exchange, which they believed allowed traders to profit from falling markets, hurting farmers. They also believed that private traders artificially held down prices during the fall harvest in order to shortchange producers.

== Previous attempts to reform the grain trade ==
=== Elevator co-ops ===
Some attempts had been made to set up co-operative grain elevators. There were many local co-ops that owned a single elevator, but the two most important were the United Grain Growers (U.G.G.) and the Saskatchewan-government backed Saskatchewan Co-operative Elevator Company (Sask. Co-op Elevators). U.G.G. was formed by merger of two smaller co-ops: the Alberta government-backed Alberta Farmers' Co-operative Elevator Company and the Grain Growers Grain Company (G.G.G.C., which had previously acquired the elevators of failed Manitoba government elevator company) in 1917. Following the merger, U.G.G. was a powerful force with 300 elevators and a terminal at the Lakehead. While U.G.G. and Sask. Co-op Elevators were farmer-owned, they did not follow the traditional co-op structure of paying dividends back to the users on a patronage basis (per the amount of business), instead they paid dividends to shareholder-investors. For diehard co-operators this was unacceptable. Furthermore, the two companies were unable to negotiate a merger between themselves and were not involved in marketing grain overseas. They lacked the size or reach to challenge the open-market system.

=== Government marketing ===
During the Great War the Canadian government had completely taken over the grain industry. The government created a series of boards in and around the war, each with progressively more power to control the grain trade. The Board of Grain Commissioners of 1912 was purely for regulation (to supervise grading, etc.), but by 1915 the government had seized control of all wheat exports to help the war effort, and by 1917 futures trading on the Winnipeg Exchange was banned. In 1917, the new Board of Grain Supervisors was given monopoly powers over wheat, and fixed uniform prices across the country. Soon after the Board took over marketing of crops as well. Farmers were worried that after the war prices would crash and various agrarian groups lobbied Ottawa to keep the Board in place. The government relented by creating the Canadian Wheat Board for the 1919 crop only. Farmers got a guaranteed price for that crop, paid immediately, and later a further payment once the Board had sold all harvest and made a profit. This system of guaranteed prices and distributed income was extremely popular and when the Board dissolved in 1920, farmers were livid. It certainly did not help that, "from a peak of $2.85 per bushel in September, 1920 [prices] began a slow and sickening decline to less than a dollar a bushel in late 1923." This marked contrasted to the stable prices of 1919–1920 Board seemed to confirm farmer's suspicions of market trading.

== See also ==
There were three wheat pools in Canada:

- Alberta Wheat Pool 1923–1998 – merged to form Agricore Cooperative Limited
- Saskatchewan Wheat Pool 1924–2007 – renamed Viterra; in 2012 acquired by Glencore and Canada assets sold to Agrium
- Manitoba Pool Elevators 1926–1998 – merged to form Agricore Cooperative Limited
- Canadian Wheat Board was a government agency responsible for exporting wheat. Created in 1935 by the federal government, its future is now threatened by government desire to divest their interest in CWB to form a co-operative.
- Paper Wheat, a documentary play and film about the formation of Canada's wheat pools
- David Handley
- History of agriculture in Canada
