= Viterra =

Multi-national agricultural company

Viterra Limited
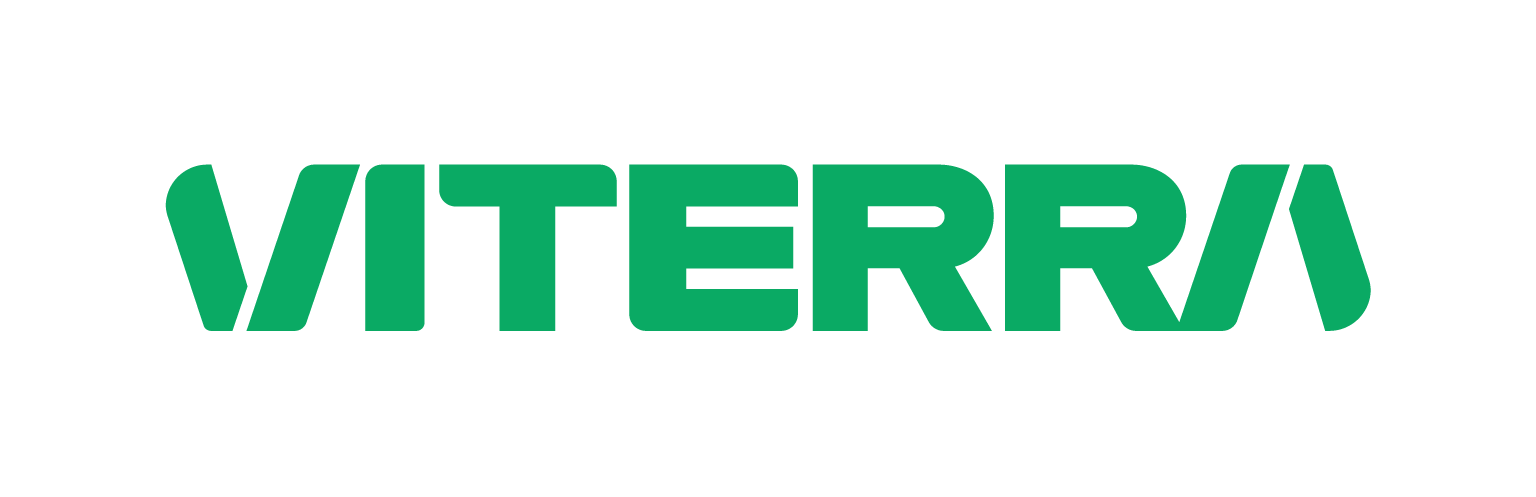
- Type: Subsidiary
- Industry: Agriculture
- Founded: 1993; 33 years ago
- Headquarters: Rotterdam, Netherlands
- Key people: Kyle Jeworski
- Parent: Bunge Limited
- Website: www.viterra.com

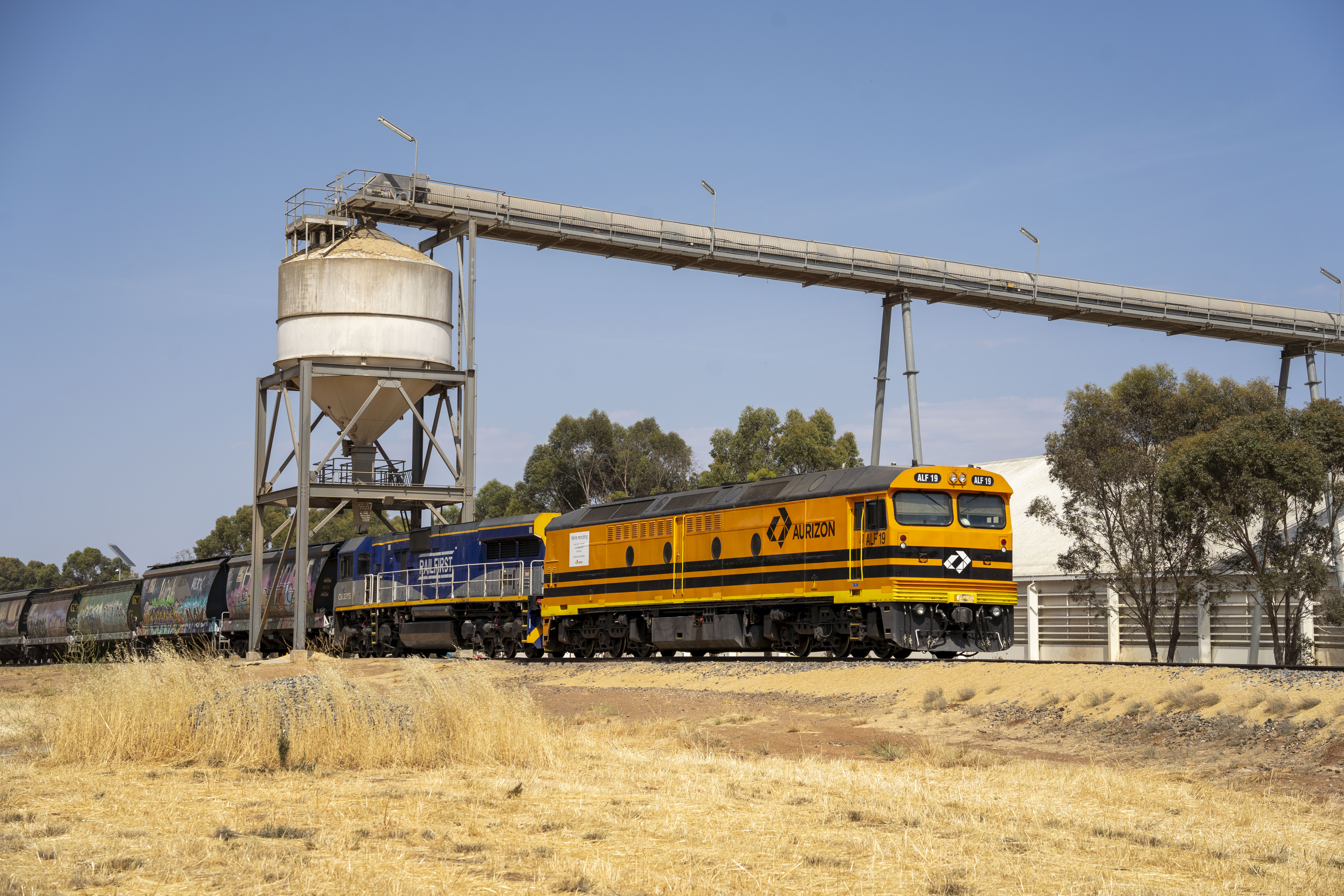
An Aurizon grain train loading at Viterra's Snowtown, South Australia bunker site in November 2023

Viterra Limited is a Canadian grain handling business, that began as the nation's largest grain handler, with its historic formative roots in prairie grain-handling cooperatives, among them the Saskatchewan Wheat Pool.

Viterra Inc grew into a global agri-business with operations in Canada, the United States, Australia, New Zealand, and China. Viterra operated three distinct, inter-related businesses: Grain Handling & Marketing, Agri-Products and Processing, enabling it to generate earnings at various points on the food production chain from field to the table.

Following its $6.1-billion acquisition by Glencore International, on 1 January 2013, Viterra was merged with Glencore purchaser, 8115222 Canada Inc., headquartered in Rotterdam, the Netherlands.

Viterra's grain handling and marketing operations were located primarily in two of the world's most fertile regions: Western Canada and South Australia. The company owns and operates grain terminals in Western Canada, along with 95% of the grain handling and storage facilities in South Australia. The company ships grain to markets worldwide.

Viterra was also one of the largest agri-product retailers in Canada, with a network of more than 250 retail locations throughout the Prairies. As part of this business, Viterra owned a 34% interest in Canadian Fertilizer Limited CFI, a large urea and ammonia plant.

The company also operated several value-added processing businesses, including wholly owned subsidiaries like Dakota Growers Pasta Company, 21st Century Grain, making it the largest producer of industrial oats in North America, the third largest producer of pasta on the continent, the largest malt producer in Australia, a large producer of canola and a leading producer of animal feed in New Zealand.

At the time of the Glencore's March 2012, back-to-back purchase-and-agreement of Viterra's assets to Agrium, which paved the way for Glencore's purchase of Viterra, in December 2012, Viterra was generating "$2.4-billion in revenue and $244-million in EBITDA" and operated a "network of 258 agri-products retail locations throughout Western Canada and 17 retail locations in Australia. Retail locations offer fertilizer, crop protection products, seed and equipment to growers. Viterra also has a minority interest in a nitrogen fertilizer manufacturing plant in Medicine Hat, Alberta."

== History ==
Viterra Inc. was formed in 2007 as a publicly traded corporation when the Saskatchewan Wheat Pool acquired Agricore United, which was at that time the largest grain handler in Western Canada. Viterra's predecessors were the grain-trading co-operatives set up in Canada during the 1920s known as the wheat pools. It has since acquired the former Australian government-sponsored monopsony marketing board, the Australian Barley Board, created in 1939.

Grain Growers Grain Company (1906-2008)
Saskatchewan Cooperative Elevator Company (1911–1926)
United Grain Growers (1917–2001)
Saskatchewan Co-Operative Wheat Producers (1923–1953)	Alberta Wheat Pool (1923–1998)	Manitoba Pool Elevators (1926–1998)
Australian Barley Board (1939–1999)
Sask. Wheat Pool (1953–2007)
Agricore (1998-2001)	AusBulk formerly South Australian Cooperative Bulk Handling (SACBH) (?-2004)	United Grower Holdings (?-2004)
Agricore United (2001–2007)	ABB Grain (1999–2009)
VITERRA (2007-2013)

== Mergers ==
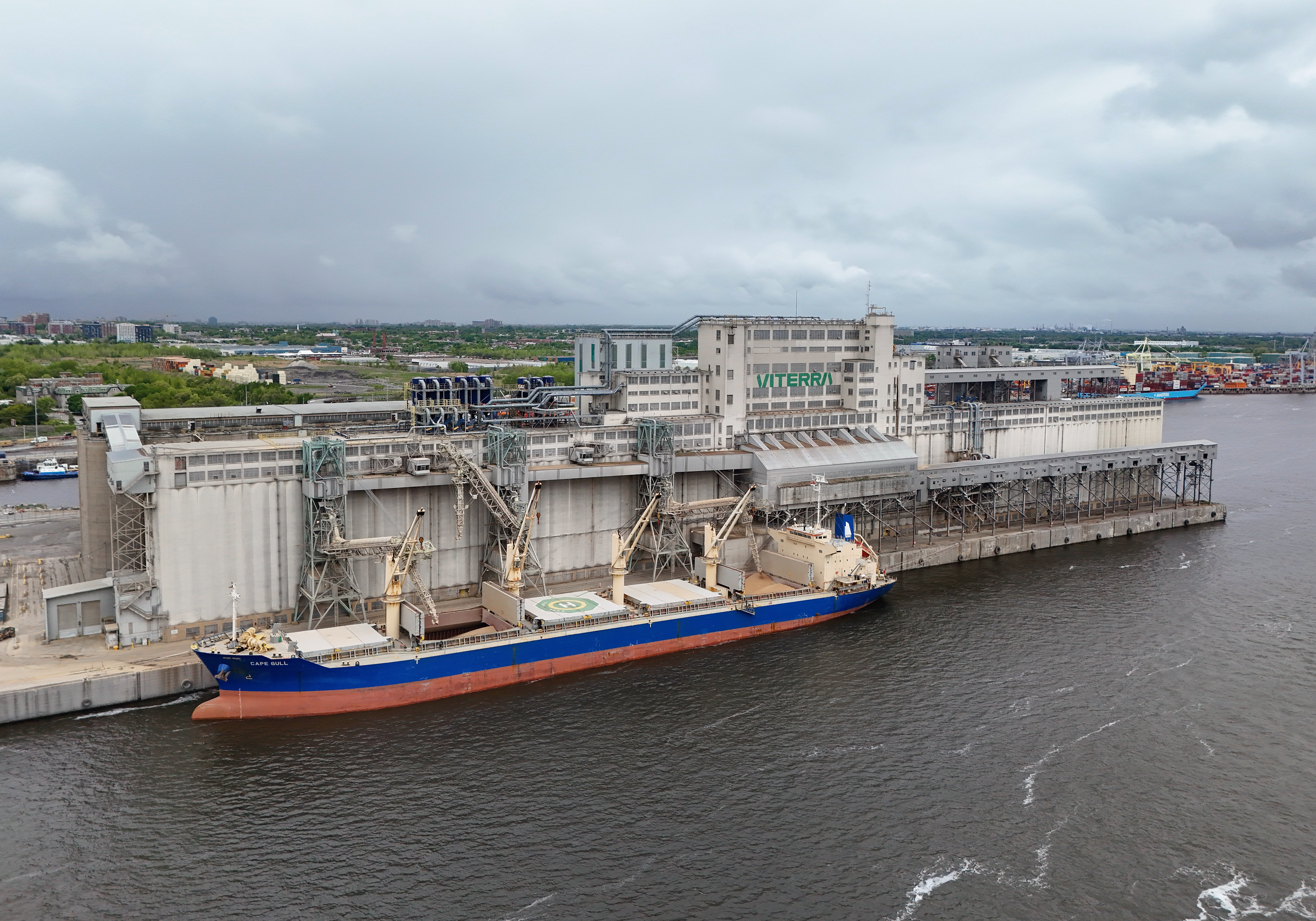
Grain terminal at Port of Montreal

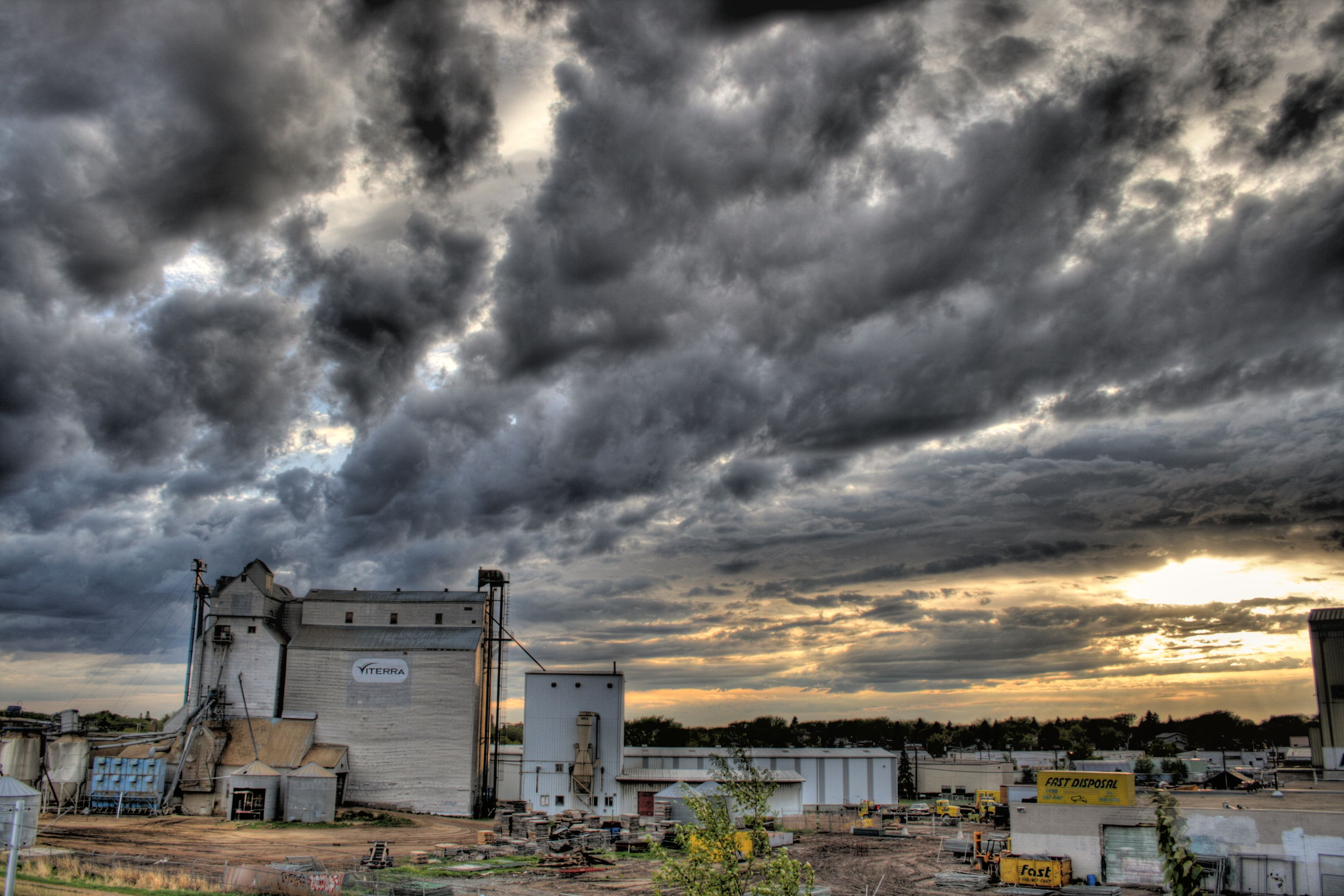
Viterra building near Fort Road in Edmonton, Alberta.

On 19 May 2009, Viterra announced it would buy Australian ABB Grain for C$1.4 billion. On 9 September, 84 percent of ABB shareholders voted in favour of the merger, with 75 percent required to pass the resolution.

On March 15, 2012, Viterra announced that it had received takeover offers from multiple parties. Glencore was revealed to have offered a takeover bid of $6.1 billion. It intended to immediately sell off its Canadian assets to Agrium and Richardson International while retaining Viterra's overseas assets. The takeover deal was completed in December 2012.

Following Glencore's takeover of Viterra in December 2012, Viterra underwent some major changes. Viterra Inc. (Viterra) was acquired by a Glencore purchaser, 8115222 Canada Inc. and merged under the Canada Business Corporations Act (CBCA). The new board of directors includes Mr. Chris Mahoney (Director of Agricultural Products of Glencore), Mr. Ernest Mostert (Financial Manager of Glencore Grain), Mr. Robert Wardell and Mr. Larry Ruud (President & CEO One Earth Farms Corp).

In preparation for Glencore's acquisition of Viterra in December 2012, in March 2012, Agrium Inc entered into a $1.15bn sale agreement with Glencore, who in this way divested "90 percent of Viterra’s Canadian retail facilities, all of its Australian retail facilities, as well as their minority position in a nitrogen facility located in Medicine Hat, Alberta."

In 2016, Glencore sold a minority stake in the business to the Canada Pension Plan, who paid "US$2.5 billion for a 40 percent stake" in its global agricultural assets, by then renamed "Glencore Agriculture".

In 2020, Glencore Agriculture rebranded to Viterra and created a new brand identity, building off the Viterra brand that was created in 2007. In 2022, Gavilon was purchased by Viterra for $1.1 billion; it is expected Gavilon will be fully integrated in Viterra by early 2023.

In 2023, a merger with Bunge Limited was announced, though the merger was only approved by the Government of Canada in January 2025. In July 2025, Bunge announced that it had completed its $34 billion merger with Viterra.

== See also ==
- ABB Grain
- Alberta Wheat Pool
- Cargill
- Glencore
- Richardson International
- United Grain Growers
