= Alberta Wheat Pool =

- Industry: Agriculture
- Founded: 1923
- Defunct: 1998
- Fate: Merged
- Successor: Agricore, Agricore United, Viterra
- Headquarters: Alberta, Canada
- Products: Grain buying

The Alberta Wheat Pool was the first of Canada's wheat farmer co-operatives in 1923.

== History ==
=== Early years ===
In 1923, the United Farmers of Alberta met with then Attorney General John Edward Brownlee to consider setting up a Wheat Pool just in Alberta. On the advice of Aaron Sapiro, a California lawyer they created a non-share, non-profit organization responsible solely for selling wheat for the best advantage. It was set up as a one-man, one-vote organization, with a 5-year contract required to deliver 100% of his commercial wheat to the Pool.

United Grain Growers grain company and the Alberta Pacific Elevator company agreed to accept Pool deliveries in their facilities. Other elevator owners quickly agreed to accept Pool wheat when they realized the pricing power the farmers had created.

The Pool purchased the grain produced by its members at a provisional or initial price. The pool then sold the grain, and if there was a surplus in the account at the end of the year, it was distributed to its members at a pro-rated basis. Everyone who was a member of the Pool received the same price. Initially 26,000 farmers joined the Pool, with hundreds of shipping points.

The Alberta Wheat Pool started making direct sales to flour milling companies and even exported grain directly. Direct sales accounted for over 60% of the total in the first year. They had to use the services of the Winnipeg Grain Exchange, despite objections from the farmers, in order to reduce risk which would in turn satisfy the banks that financed the venture.

After the first year, the Pool began to deduct 2¢ per imperial bushel for purchase/building of Pool-owned elevators. This levy system was to be used often in the Pool's history. Considering that wheat sold at the time for over $1.00 per bushel, this was a low percentage cost. With this income, the Pool accumulated a $200,000 reserve. Shortly thereafter, Saskatchewan and Manitoba created Wheat Pools of their own.

The Pools grew in numbers and political power. In 1928 the combined Alberta, Saskatchewan and Manitoba Wheat Pools were among the biggest business concerns in Canada with a cash turnover of $323 million. The Pool attempted to purchase United Grain Growers Ltd., but the attempt failed. Instead, the Wheat Pool began to build more elevators and terminals. By the late 1960s the Wheat Pool had 567 elevators.

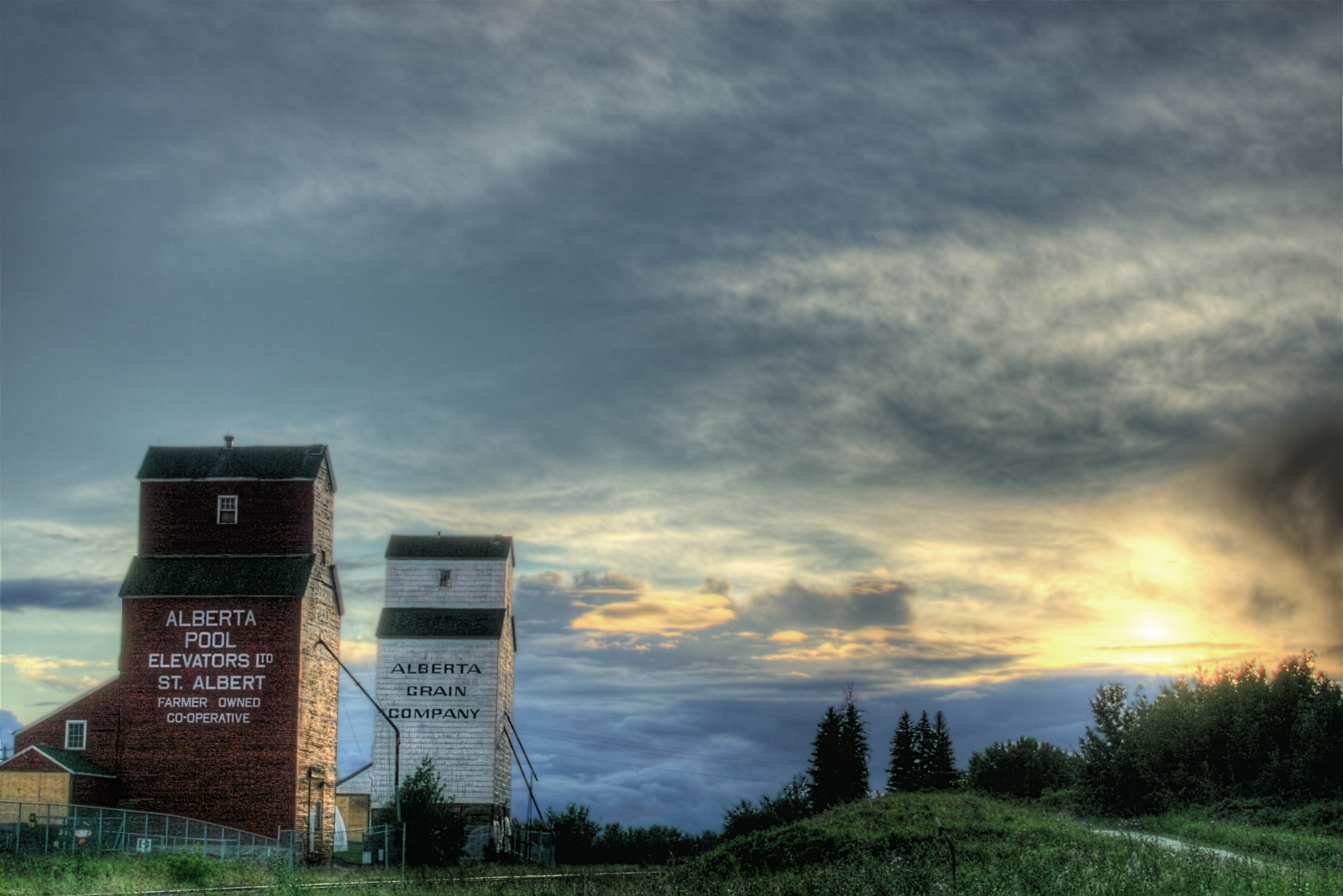
Alberta Pool Elevator by the rail line in St. Albert, Alberta.

In 1925 wheat prices rose to $2.17 then dropped down to $1.36. Fearing market collusion to lower prices, the Pool began to buy wheat futures – 3 million imperial bushels (110,000 m^{3}) worth. This had the effect of raising prices to $1.69. As a result, the Pool was extremely profitable. The Pool did so again in 1929 and again in 1930. The first was profitable, but in 1930 (in part due to the stock market collapse in 1929) there were major losses when wheat prices fell under $0.20. The losses far exceeded the profits in 1925 and in 1929 combined, and government loans were necessary to stay solvent. The loans took 17 years to pay off. In order to obtain the government loans, the Pools had to give up overseas direct sales. This caused anger among members and harsh accusations were delivered.

Nevertheless, the pool continued to grow quickly in members, wheat capacity and popularity. In 1935, a Canadian Grain Board (now the Canadian Wheat Board) was created by the government as an alternative to pooling. The board had the ability to set a minimum price for wheat, which initially was 87.5¢ per bushel.

By 1937, a worldwide poor harvest that had not affected Canada had turned the market around. Prices were well above $1 and the Canadian Wheat Board made a profit for the government. This was short lived when, in 1938, the world harvest was good and prices fell again to 60¢, creating huge losses.

=== World War II ===
During World War II, the Canadian government gave away tons of food as gifts to allies in desperate need for the war effort. Many regions in Europe could not produce food, driving up demand. Price controls helped keep the price down, but it slowly rose from 56¢ in 1940 to $1.55 in 1945.

The government issued a guarantee that wheat prices would remain above $1.00 a bushel until 1950. This was understood as part of several considerations given to the farmers in exchange for the low prices forced on them during a period when demand would normally have raised the price significantly.

=== Post World War II ===
Alberta Wheat pool continued to thrive and established itself as a world grain trader, supplier of crop input supplies and began to diversify. As production of grain increased and competition decreased the number of competitors, Alberta Wheat Pool elevators came to dominate the rural Alberta landscape.

=== Corporate mergers ===
In 1998 Alberta Wheat Pool and Manitoba Pool Elevators merged to form Agricore Cooperative Limited. In 2001, United Grain Growers combined its business operations with Agricore Cooperative Ltd. and carried on business as Agricore United, a publicly traded company, no longer a farmer-owned cooperative. In 2007, Agricore United was taken over by the Saskatchewan Wheat Pool, another publicly traded company. The merged corporation was renamed Viterra.

== Gallery and locations ==
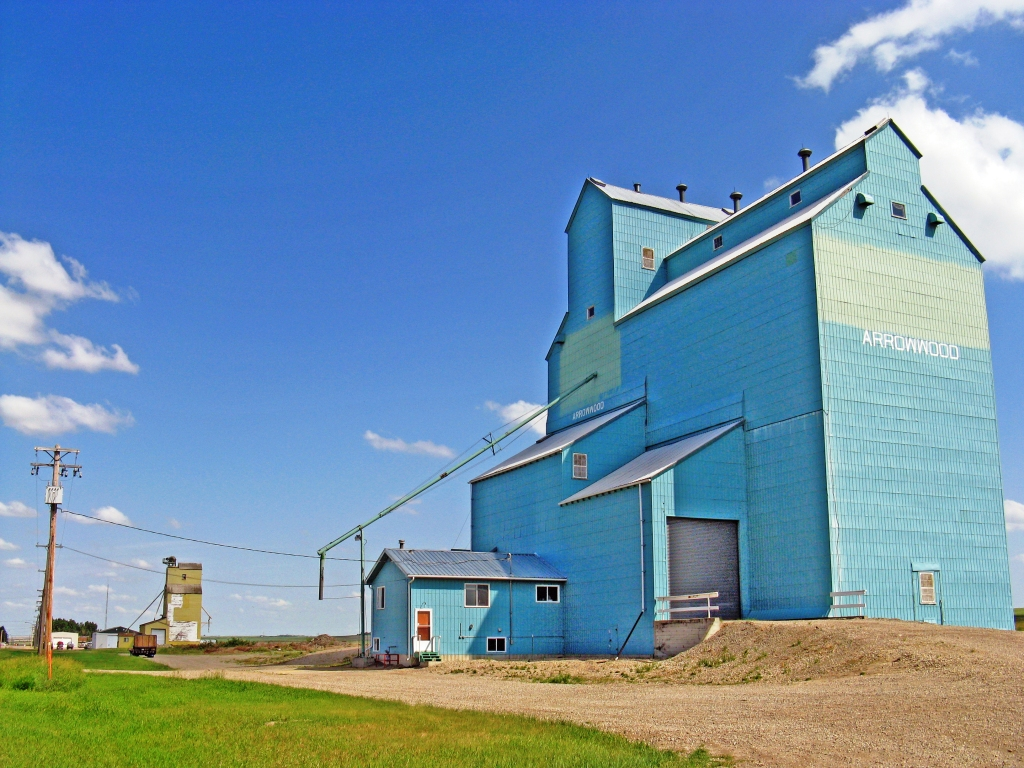
Arrowwood.

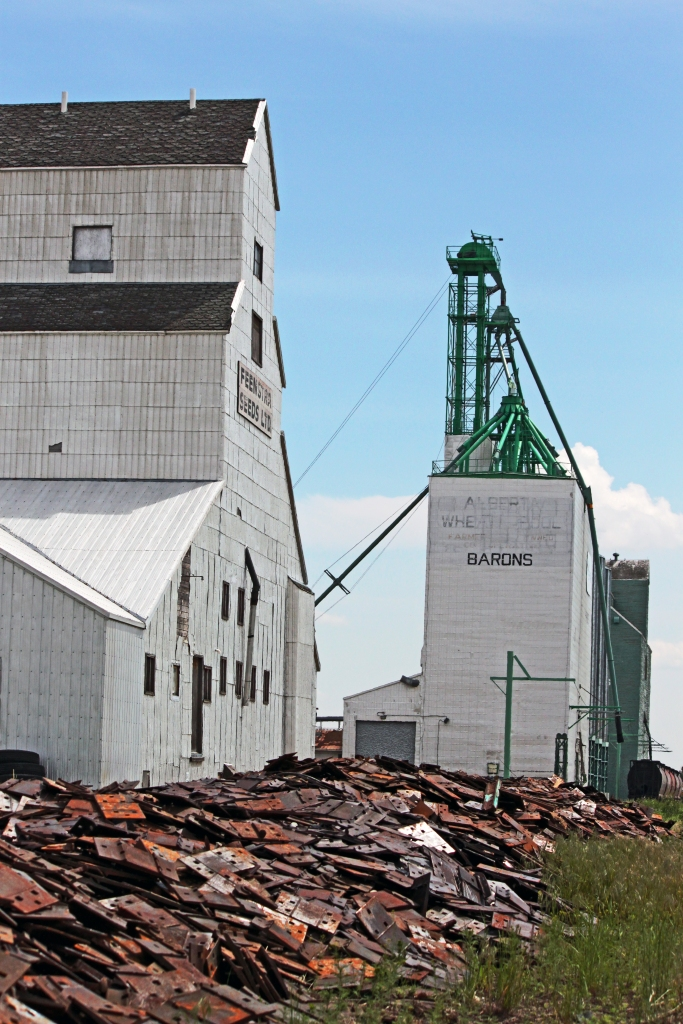
Barons.

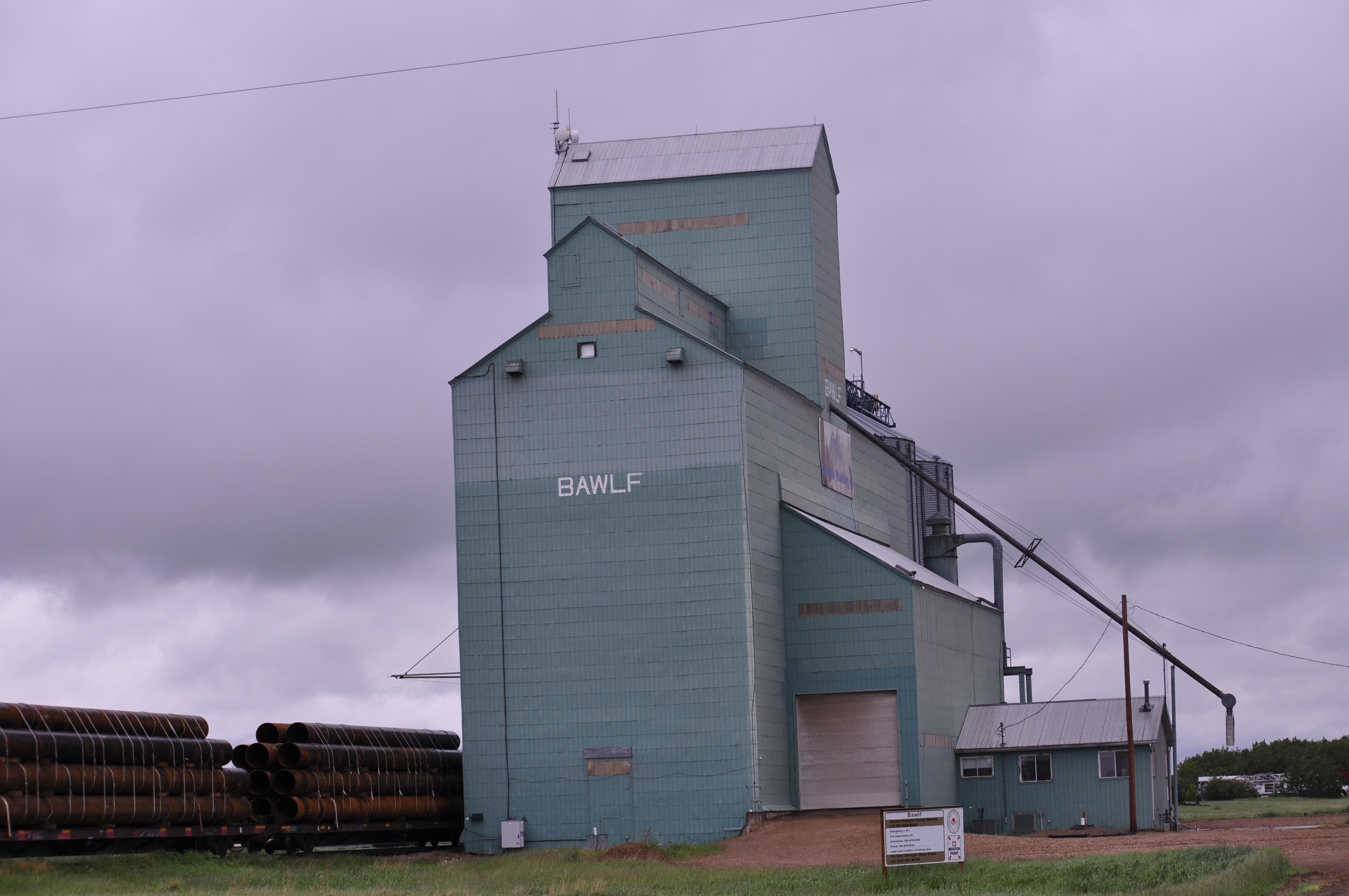
Bawlf.

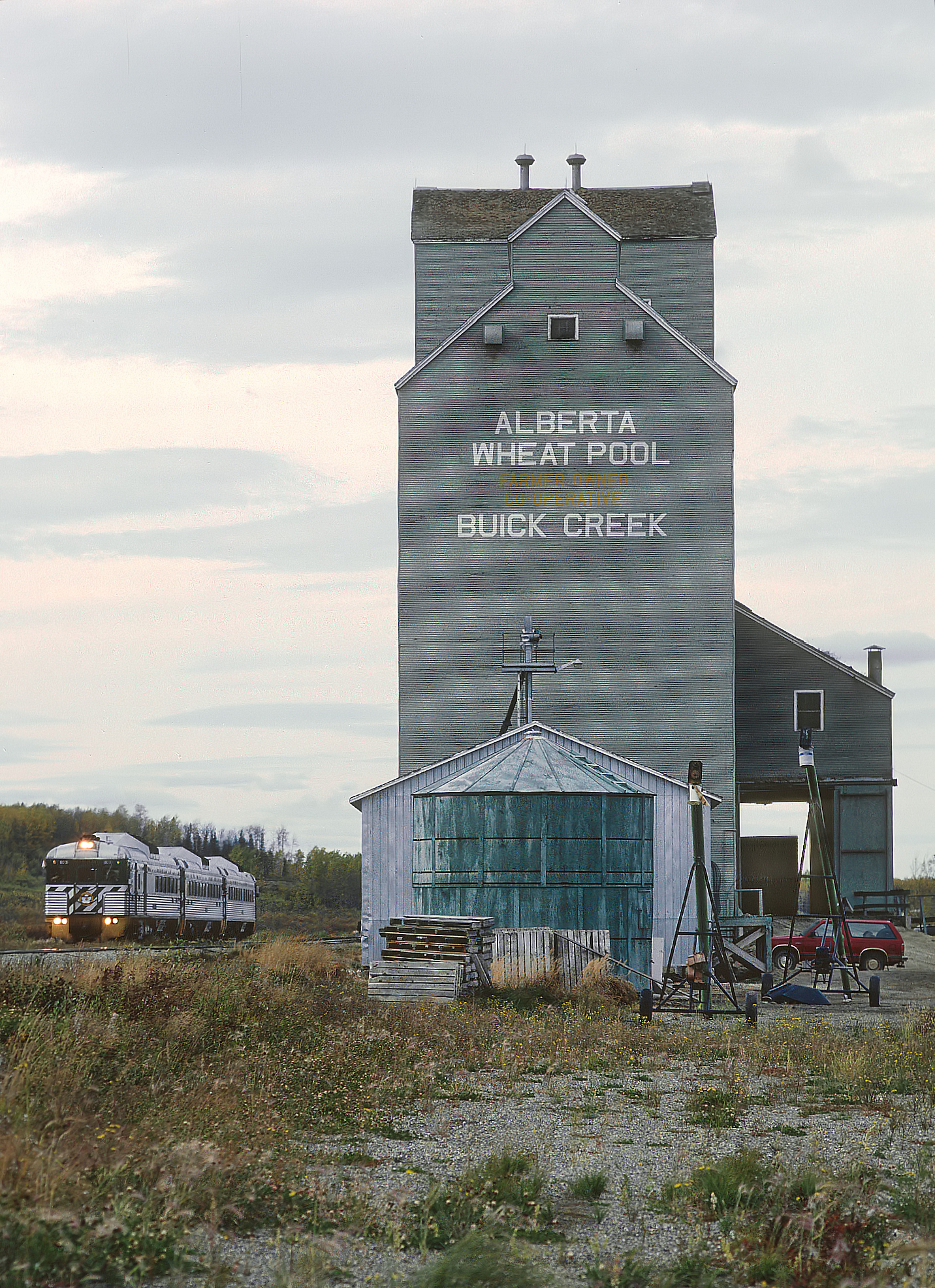
Buick, British Columbia.

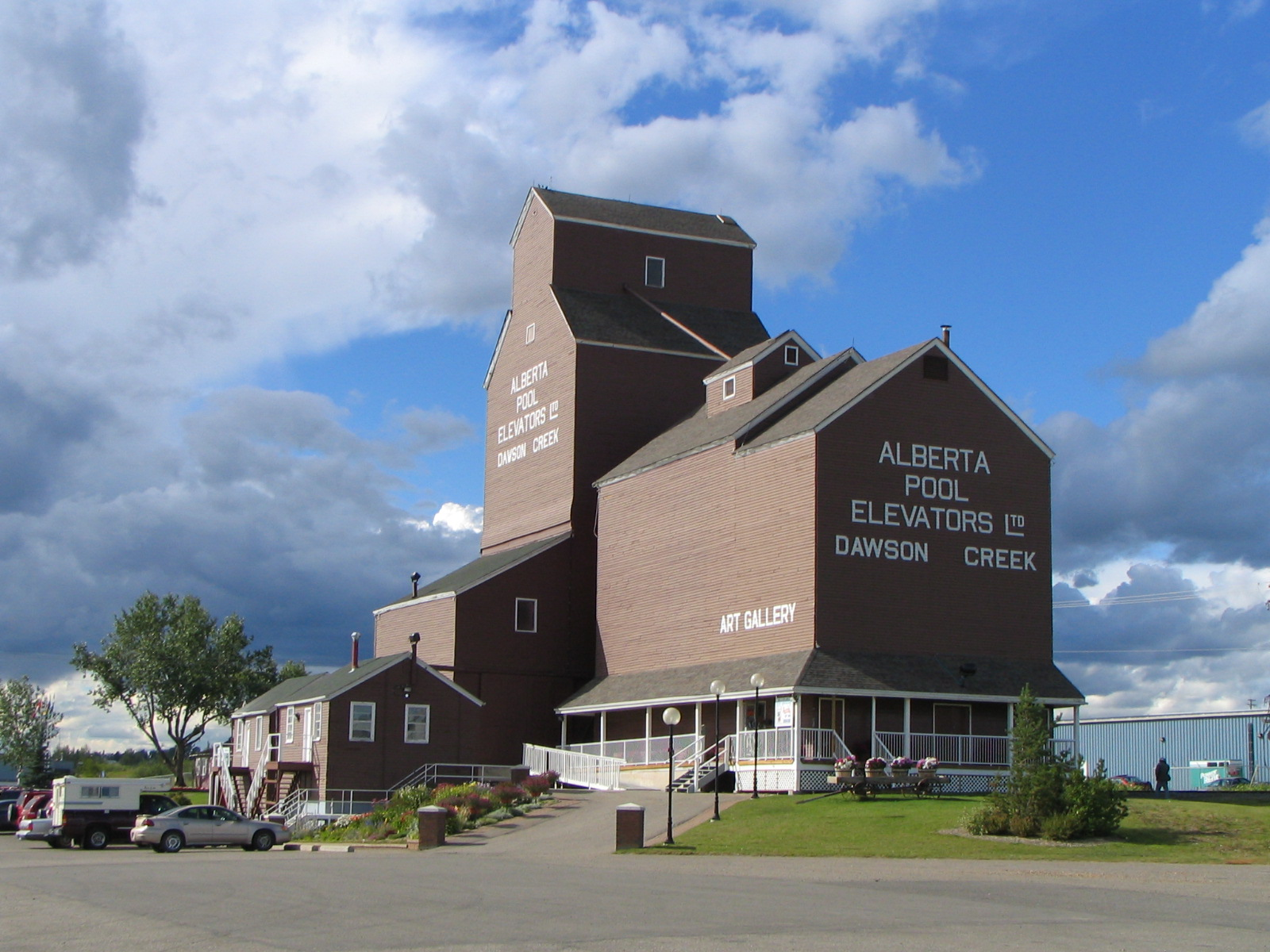
Dawson Creek, British Columbia.

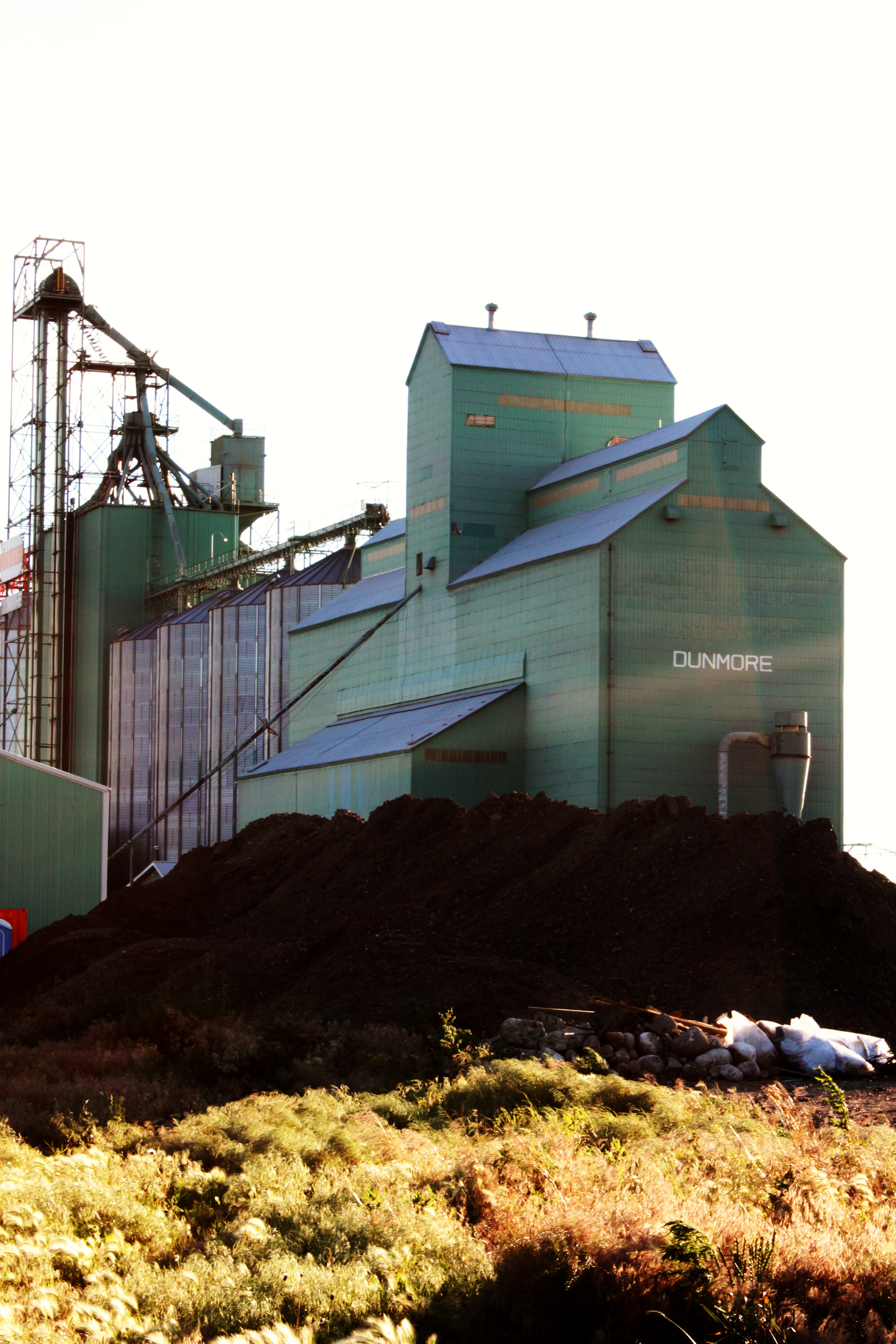
Dunmore.

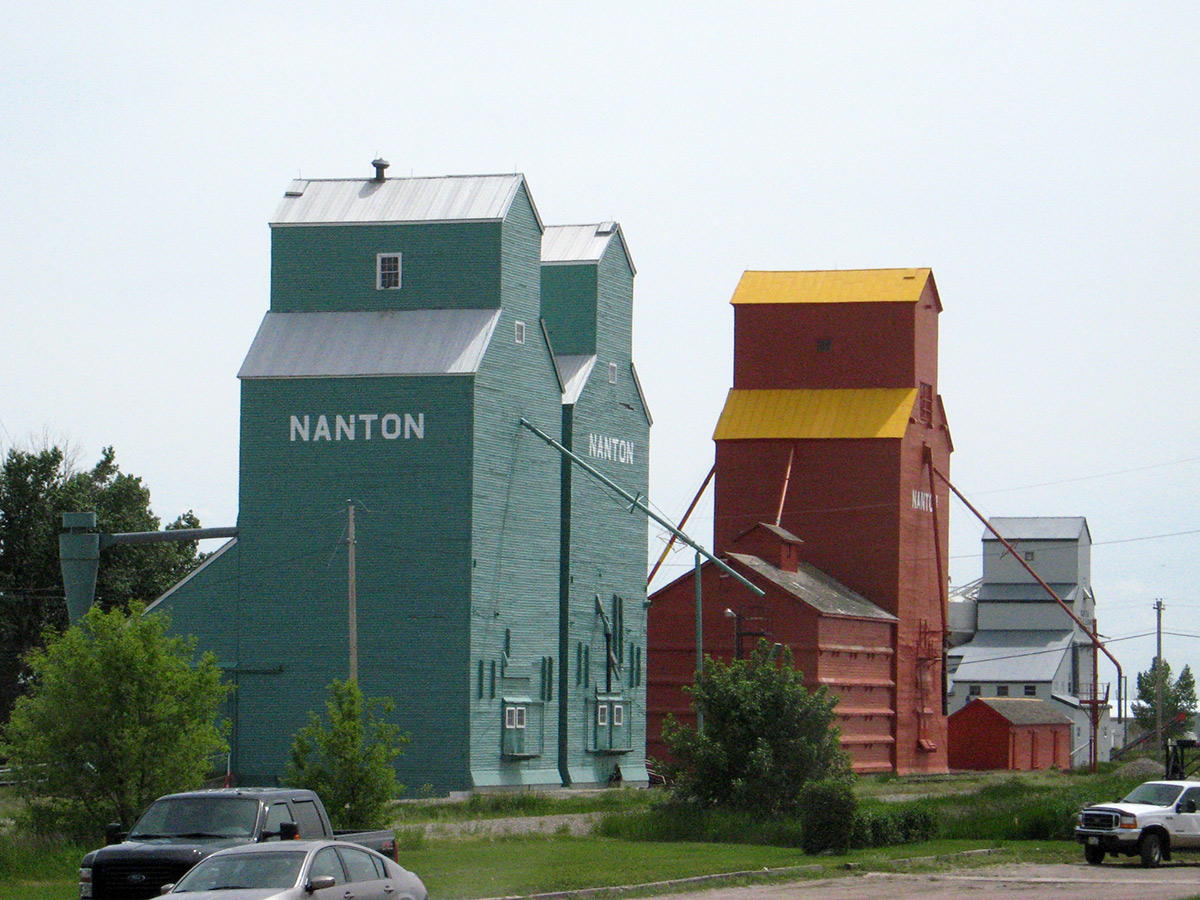
Nanton - Canadian Grain Elevator Discovery Centre.

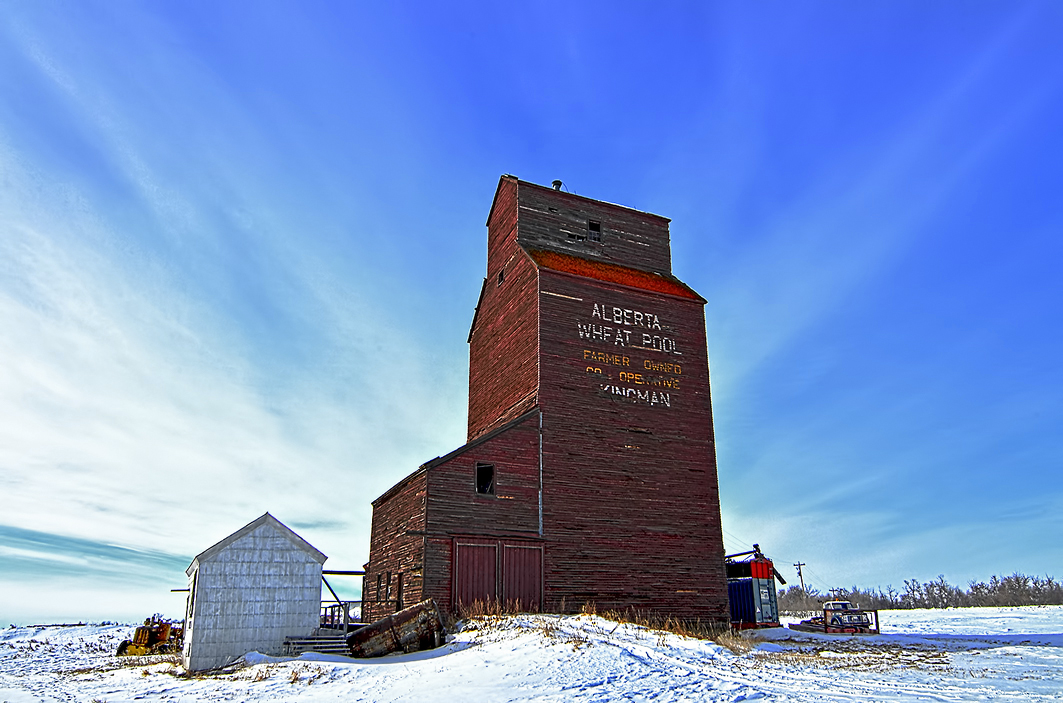
Kingman.

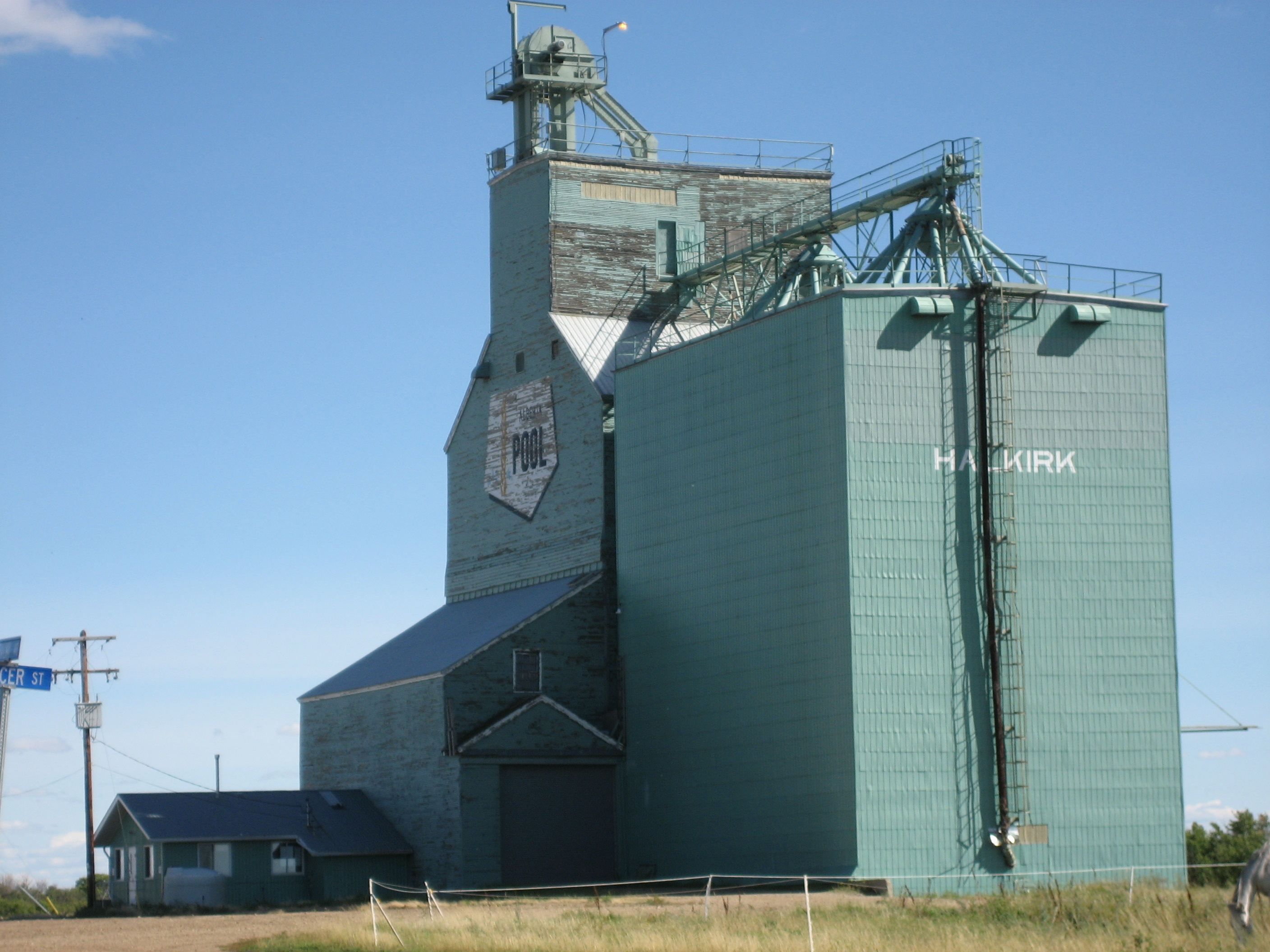
Halkirk.

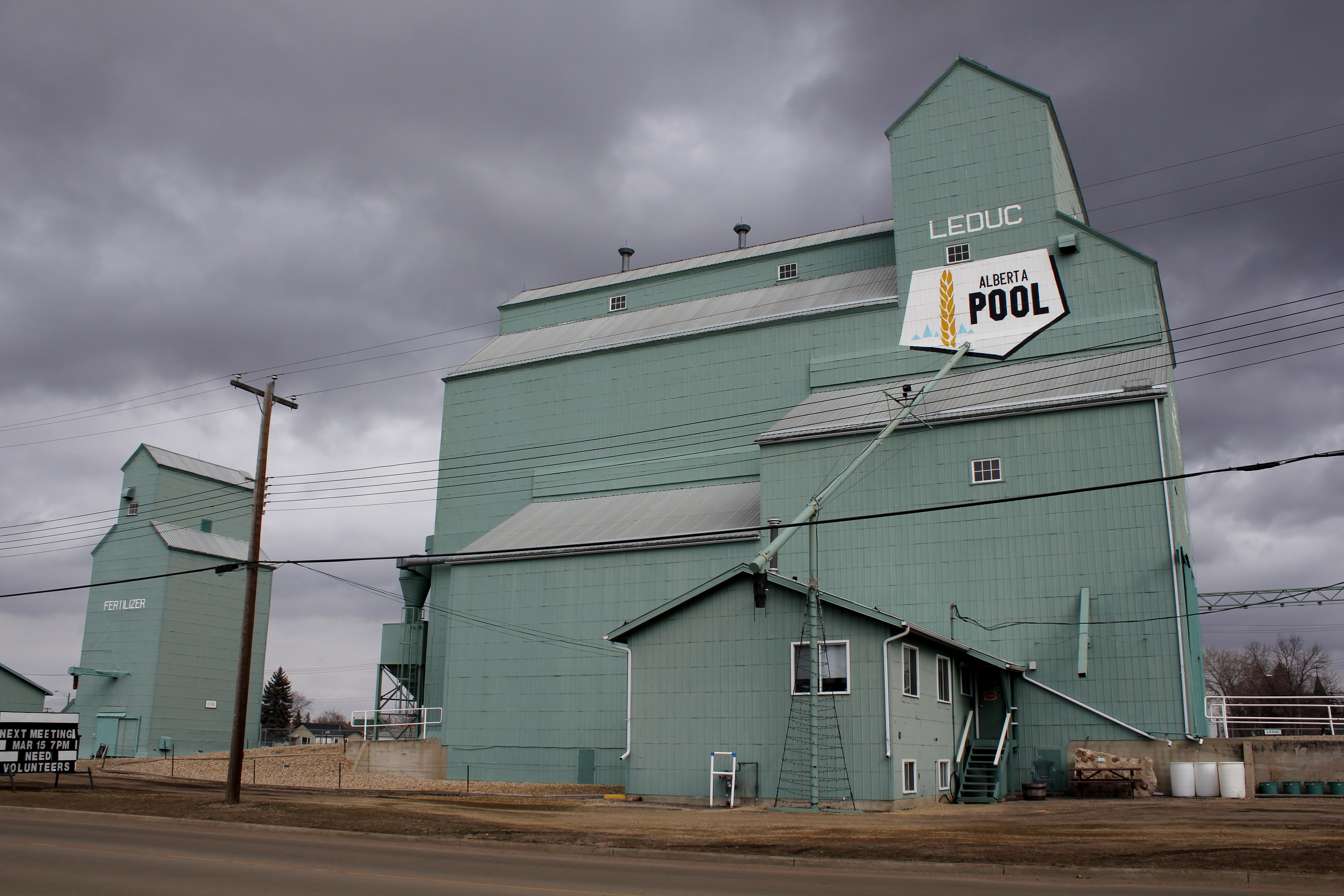
Leduc.

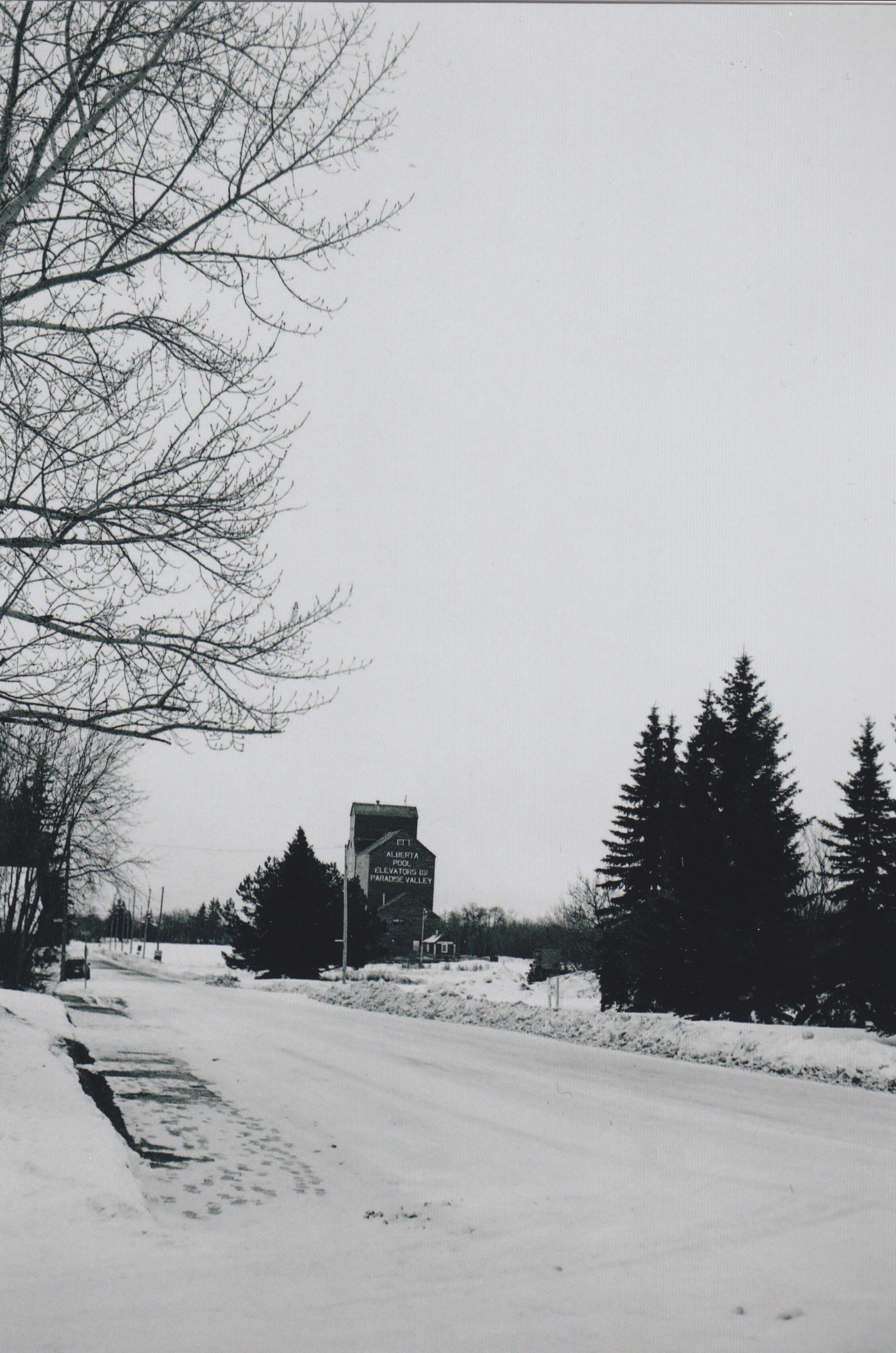
Paradise Valley.

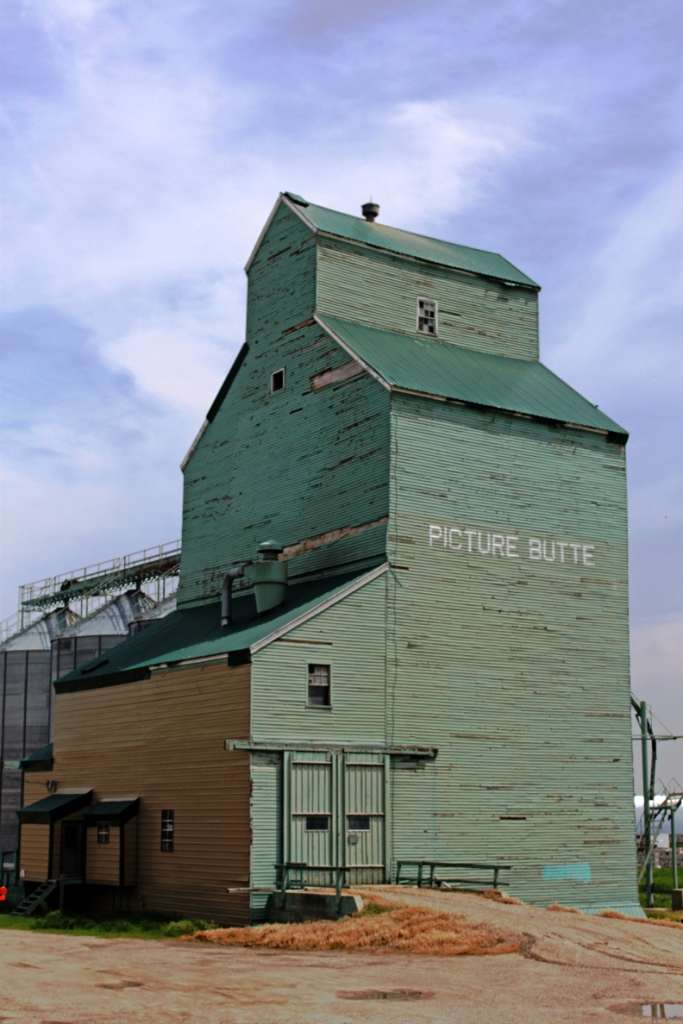
Picture Butte.

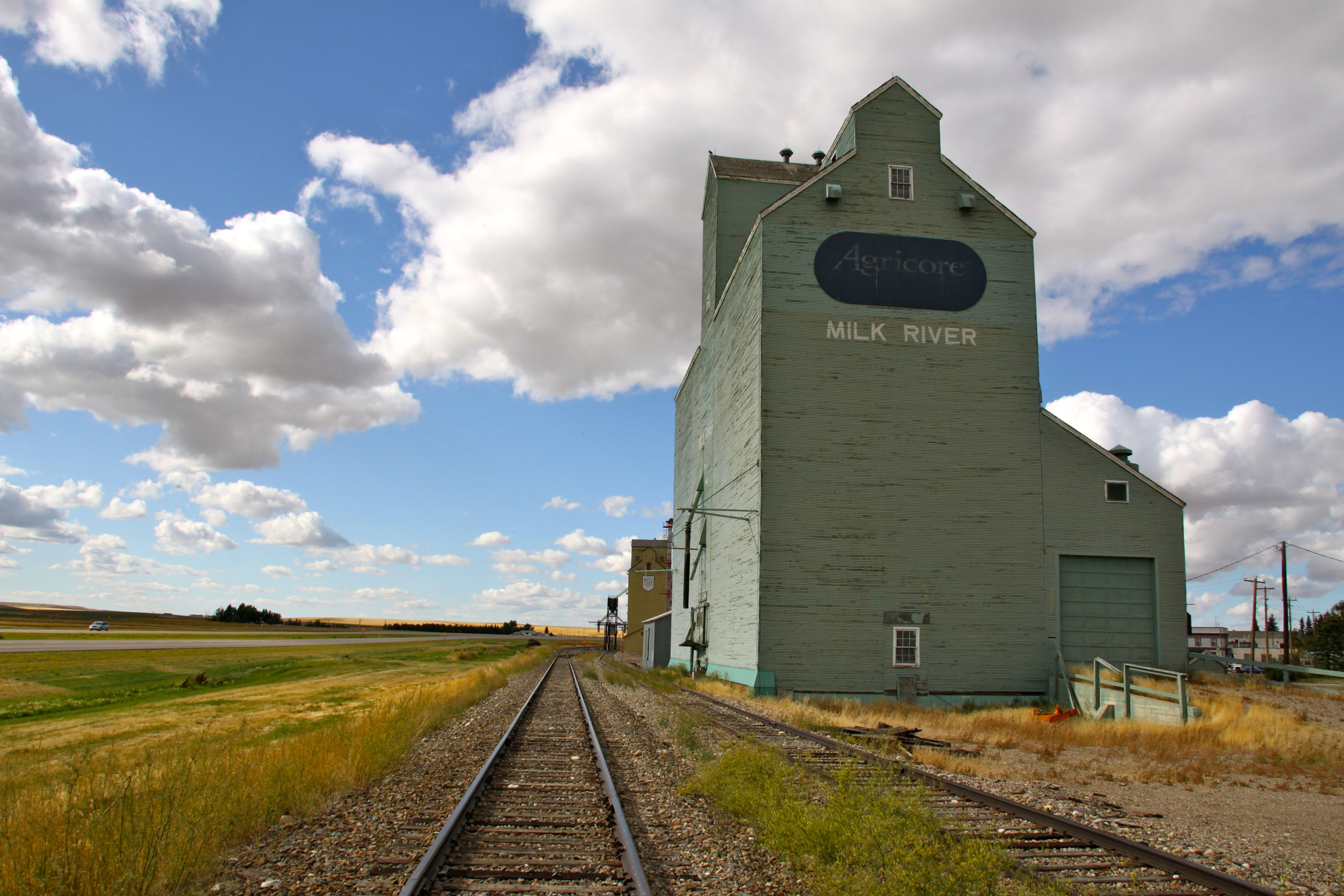
Milk River.

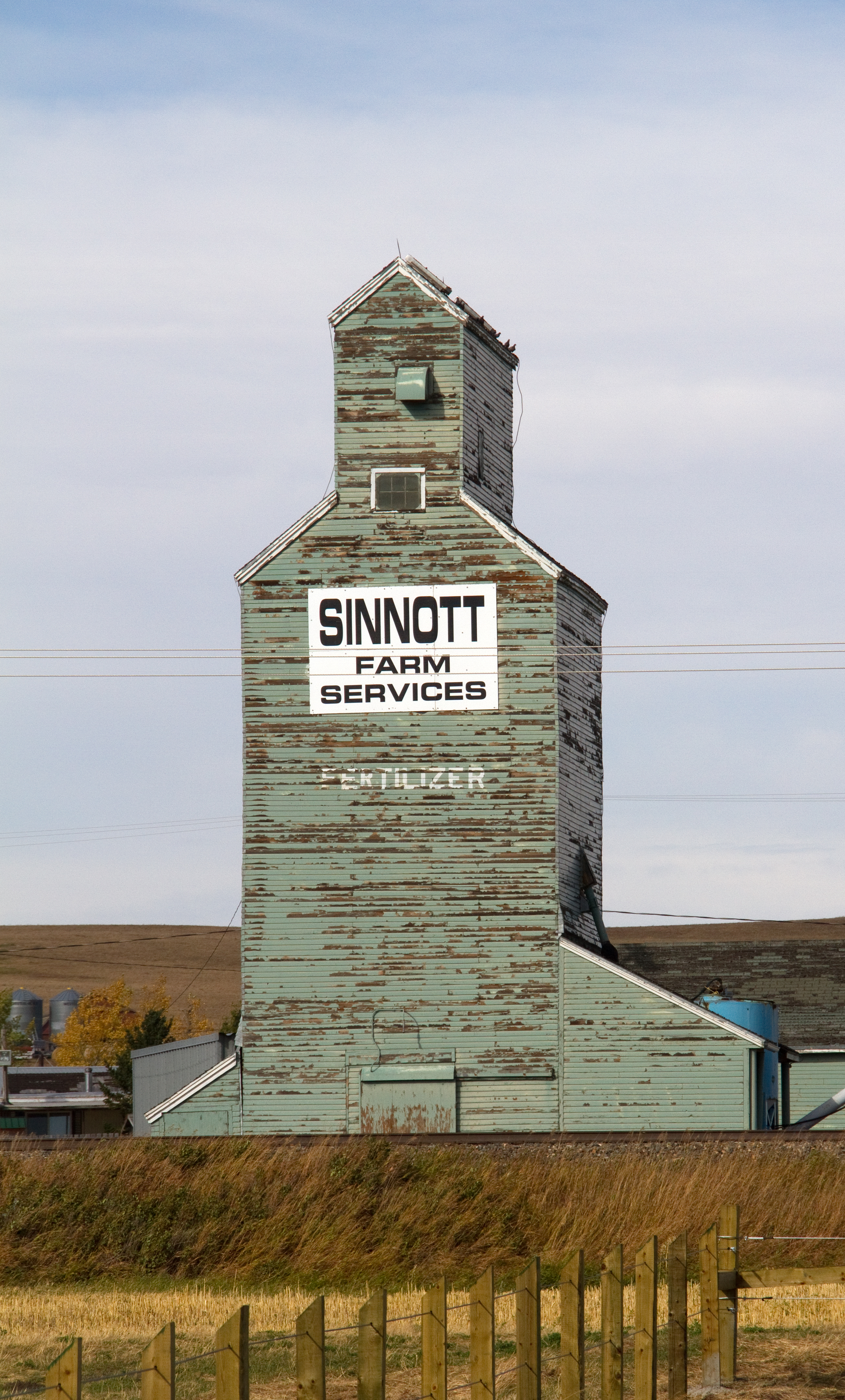
Pincher Station.

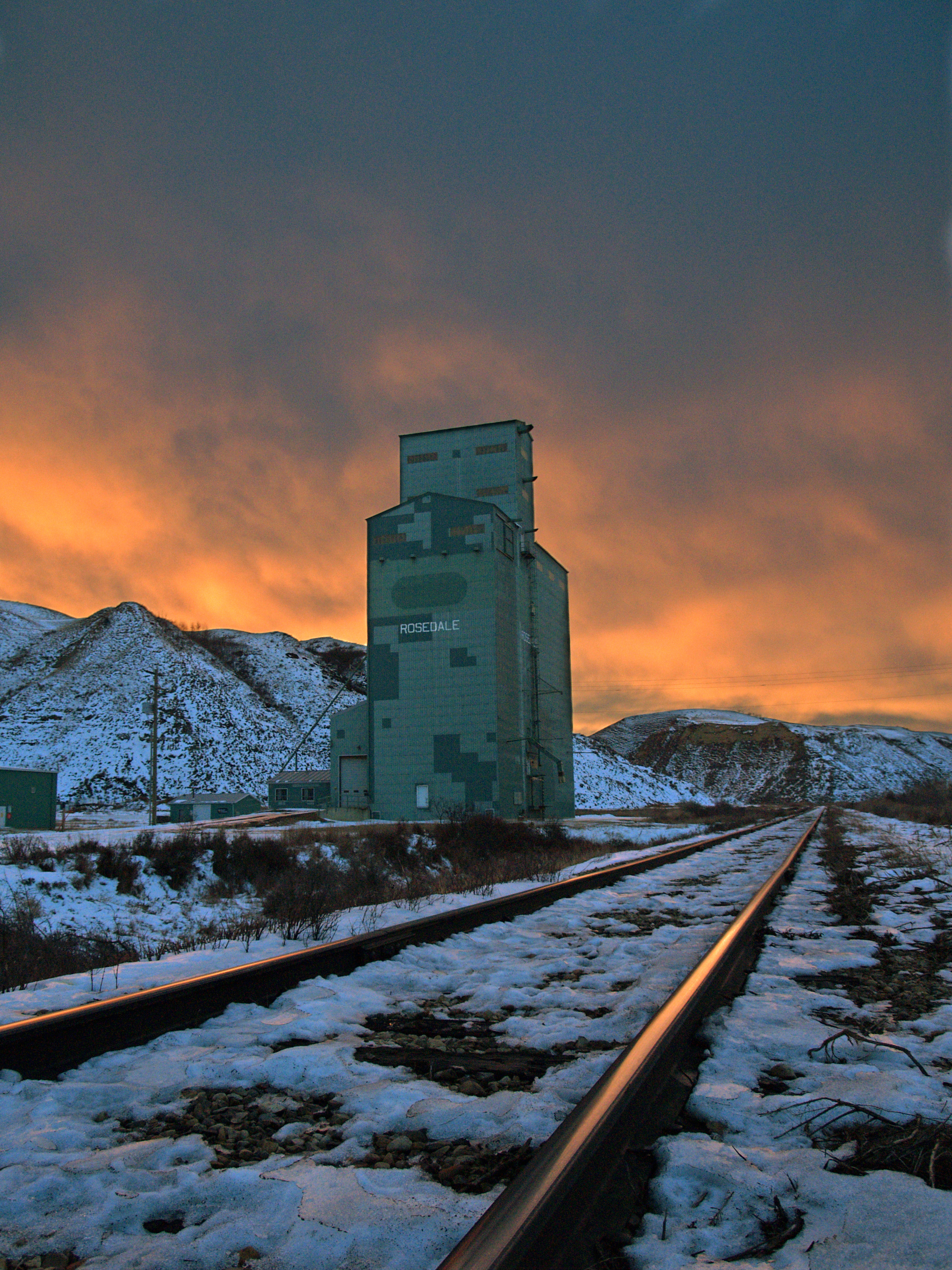
Rosedale.

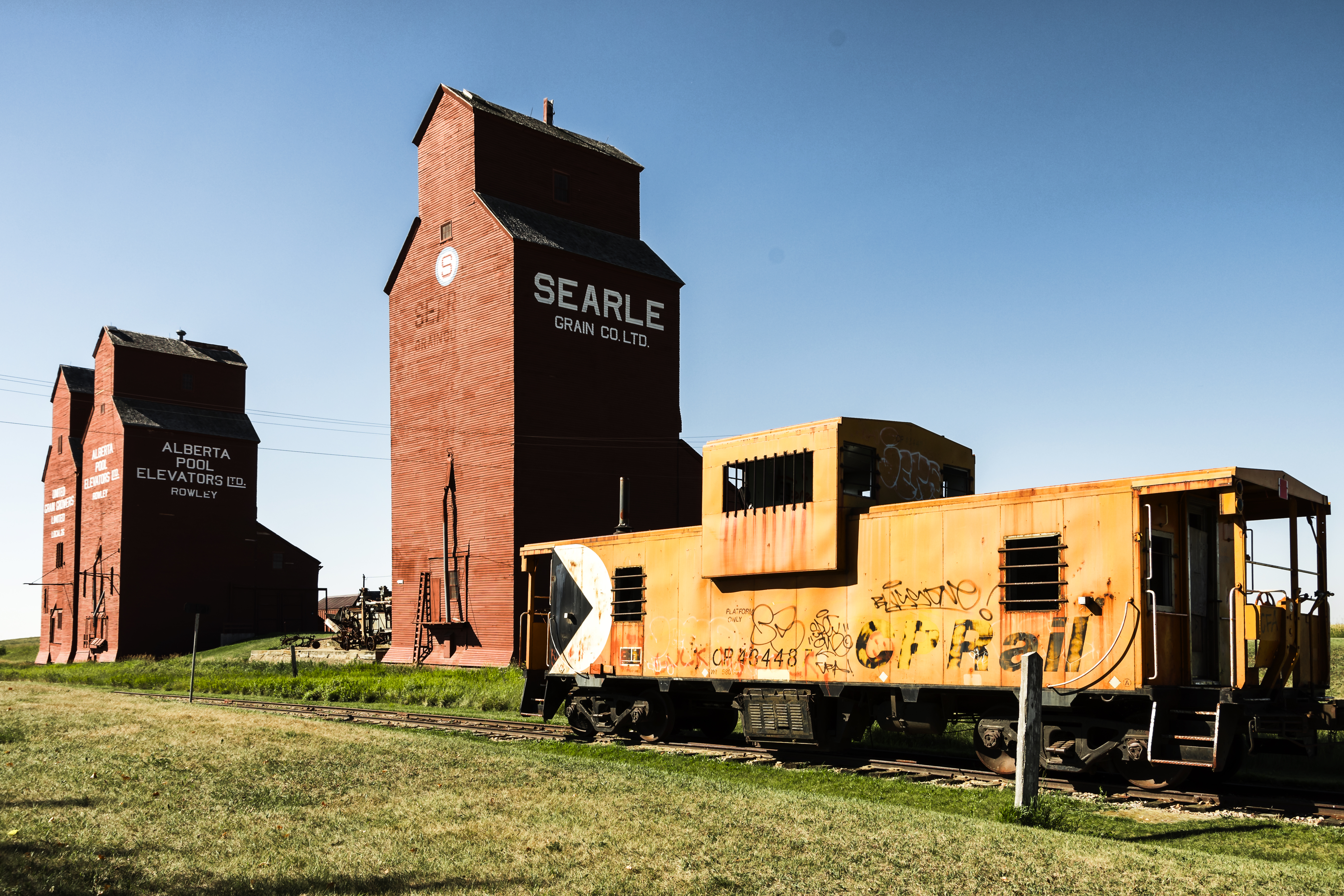
Rowley.

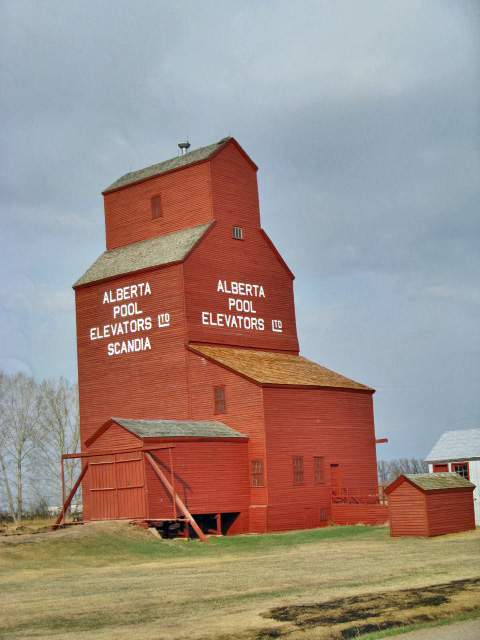
Scandia.

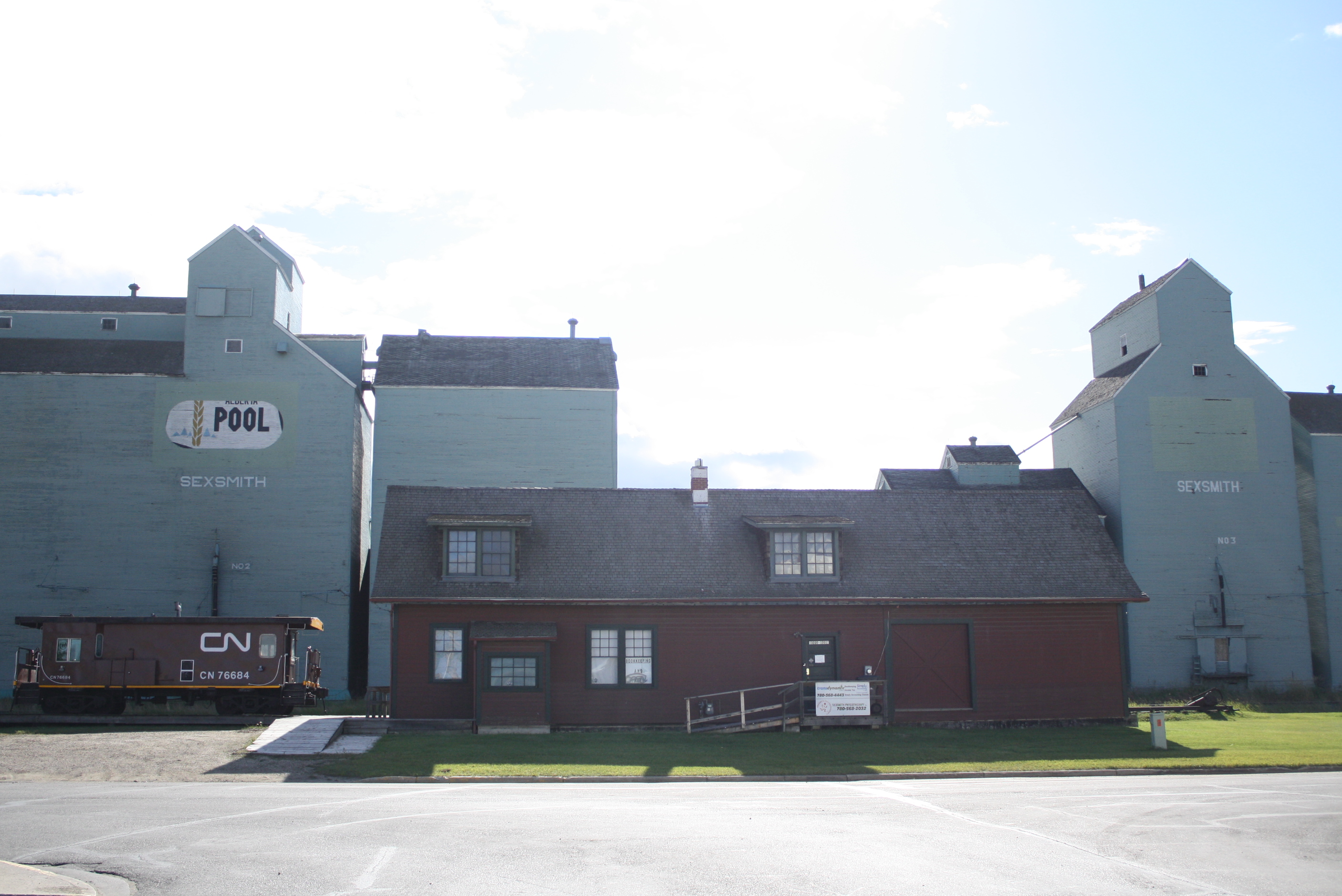
Sexsmith.

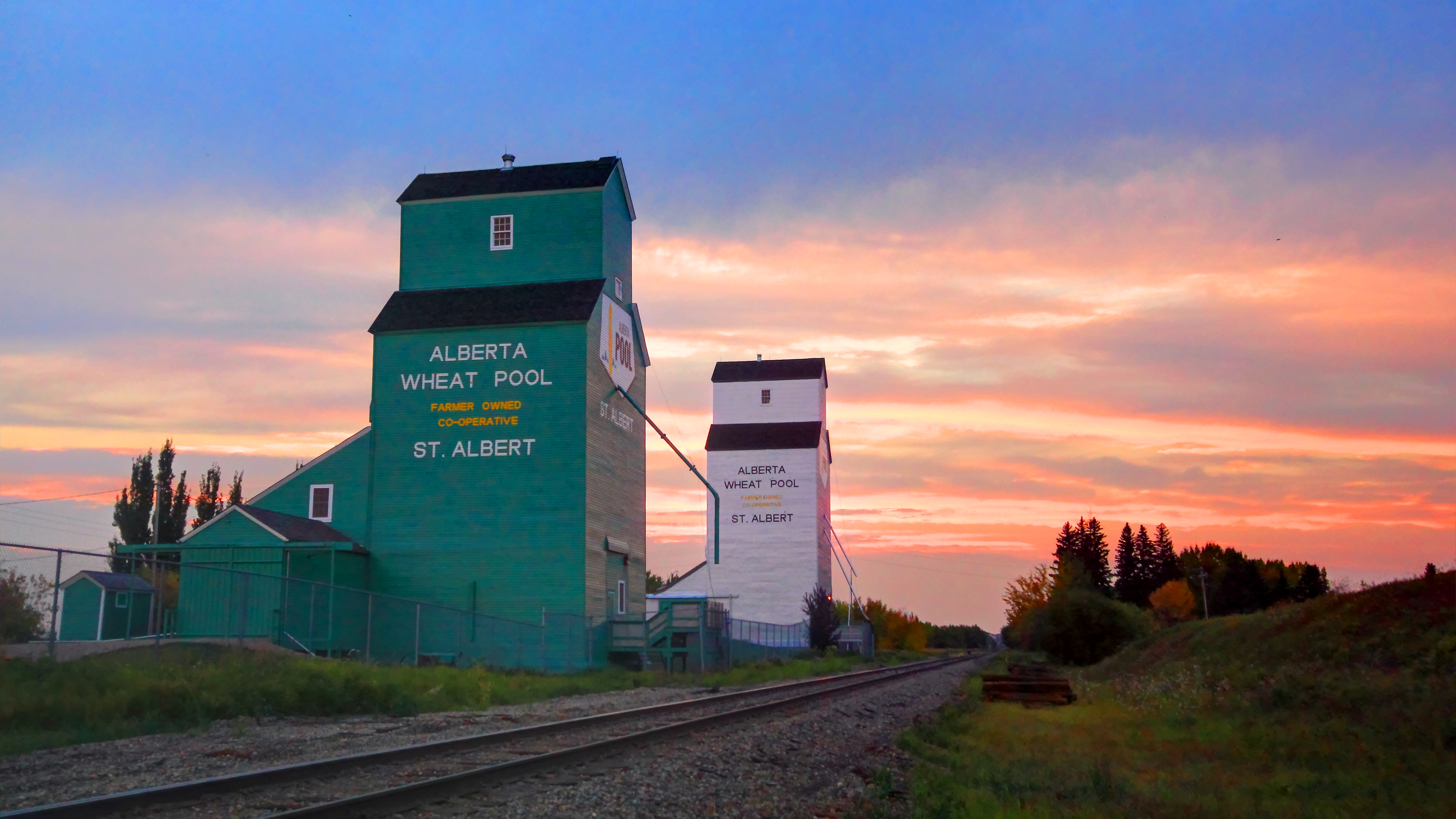
St. Albert.

== See also ==
- Wheat pool
- Agricore United
- Saskatchewan Wheat Pool
- Manitoba Pool Elevators
- United Grain Growers
- Viterra
- List of Canadian Heritage Wheat Varieties
