= Agricore United =

Canadian farmer-directed agribusiness

Agricore United, Inc.
- Type: Public
- Traded as: TSX: AU
- Founded: 2001; 25 years ago
- Defunct: 2007
- Fate: Merged with Saskatchewan Wheat Pool
- Successor: Viterra
- Headquarters: Winnipeg, Manitoba, CAN
- Products: Grain Handling, Crop Production Services, Livestock, Hail Insurance

Agricore United, Inc. was a farmer-directed agribusiness in Canada. It supplied crop nutrition and crop protection products, and offered grain handling and marketing services. It was created on November 1, 2001 by the merger of Agricore and United Grain Growers. It was headquartered in Winnipeg, Manitoba. Its shares were publicly traded on the Toronto Stock Exchange (TSX) under the symbol "AU" ("AU.LV" – Limited voting common shares; "AU.DB" – Convertible 9% debentures; "AU.PR.A" – Series 'A' preferred shares) until June 15, 2007, when it was taken over by the Saskatchewan Wheat Pool. Agri-business giant Archer Daniels Midland (ADM) had a 28% stake in the company at the time of the takeover.

== Corporate history ==
=== Ancestry ===
Agricore United was the continuation of several companies with deep historical roots in western Canada. The Grain Growers' Grain Company Limited was originally incorporated in 1906 under the laws of Manitoba. In 1917, The Grain Growers' Grain Company Limited and The Alberta Farmers' Cooperative Elevator Company Limited amalgamated to form United Grain Growers Limited (UGG). In 1923, the Alberta Wheat Pool (AWP) was incorporated under the laws of Alberta. In 1924, Manitoba Pool Elevators (MPE) was incorporated under the laws of Manitoba. In 1992, UGG was continued under the Governing Act, a Special Act of the Parliament of Canada. In 1998, AWP and MPE merged to form Agricore Cooperative Limited. In 2001, UGG combined its business operations with Agricore Cooperative Ltd. and began doing business as Agricore United.

=== Takeover ===
In November 2006, the company became the target of takeover bids from two other rival grain handlers: the Saskatchewan Wheat Pool ("SaskPool", "SWP") of Regina, Saskatchewan and Winnipeg-based James Richardson International ("JRI"). The initial and subsequent offers from SaskPool involved a stock swap, with no or little cash being offered, prompting the AU Board of Directors to reject them. In February 2007, AU and JRI announced that they had negotiated a merger arrangement to form a publicly traded company to be known as "Richardson Agricore", subject to shareholder agreement.

A subsequent bidding war led to a stock+cash offer from SaskPool and an all-cash offer from JRI to form a private company; a higher, $20.50 all-cash offer from SaskPool in May eventually prevailed, with 81% of the limited voting shares being tendered to the Pool by shareholders by the end of May, including all the ADM shares. This exceeded the 75% required by the terms of AU's incorporation to change the corporate structure and, after a special shareholders' meeting in June, AU became a wholly owned subsidiary of the Saskatchewan Wheat Pool. AU's CEO, Brian Hayward, resigned, as did the Board of Directors, and SaskPool's CEO and Board were voted in. SaskPool had Agricore United's common and preferred shares delisted from the Toronto Stock Exchange (TSX) on June 20, 2007, and the members of the senior management team for the amalgamated company were announced the next day.

As a result of the acceptance of the SaskPool offer, JRI received a $35 million termination fee and was able to purchase a number of AU's grain and farm supply facilities; Cargill Canada was able to make a similar purchase, as part of a pre-merger deal width SaskPool to satisfy Canada's Competition Bureau. AU employees, along with the grain and farm supply inventories at the affected facilities, were transferred to the purchasing companies.

It is generally believed within the Canadian agricultural industry that the biggest winners in the transaction were AU's shareholders, with SaskPool paying too much for AU, and that SaskPool gave up too many facilities to their competitors. Substantial number of head office employees are expected to be laid off once the integration of the two companies is complete.

On August 30, 2007, the company formerly known as Agricore United ceased to exist and Saskatchewan Wheat Pool was rebranded to be known as Viterra.

== Operations ==
=== Grain handling and merchandising ===
Agricore bought, marketed and transported grain, oil seeds and other special crops from the farm to end-use markets using the company's network of grain elevators from Manitoba to British Columbia and ownership/interest in port terminals in Vancouver, Thunder Bay and Prince Rupert. The grain was moved from the farmer's field to the company's geographically dispersed and strategically located country elevator network. Grain was then shipped to a domestic, U.S. or Mexican customer, such as a flour mill, crushing plant, feed mill or maltster, or to a port terminal for export to end-use customers in Europe, South America, the Pacific Rim, Africa and the Middle East.

=== Crop production services ===
The company sold more crop inputs in western Canada than any other company. This included manufacture, distribution and crop production support, including crop nutrition and crop protection products, seed and agronomic services to farmers, through about 200 locations from Manitoba to British Columbia. Agronomic Crop Enhancement (ACE) specialists provide technical advice on crop production issues and help the Customer Service Representative (CSR) advise the grower about choices for the most profitable crop practices. Beyond offering crop nutrition such as fertilizers, more than 200 crop protection products were offered including herbicides and insecticides. Agricore owned or leases three distribution warehouses, and supported the sale of crop nutrition and protection products by providing custom application services directly or through third-party contractors.

== See also ==
- Wheat pool
- Alberta Wheat Pool
- Saskatchewan Wheat Pool
- Manitoba Pool Elevators
- United Grain Growers
- Viterra
- List of Canadian Heritage Wheat Varieties
