= Athanasius (given name) =

Athanasios
- Gender: Male

Other gender
- Feminine: Athanasia

Origin
- Origin: Greek
- Meaning: Immortal
- Region of origin: Greece

Other names
- Related names: Athanasios, Athanassios, Athnasious, Atanasio, Atanacio, Athanase, Atanas, Athanasiy, Afanasy, Thanasis, Athan, Athos, Panas

Athanasios (Greek: Αθανάσιος), also transliterated as Athnasious, Athanase or Atanacio, is a Greek male name which means "immortal". In modern Greek everyday use, it is commonly shortened to Thanasis (Θανάσης), Thanos (Θάνος), Sakis (Σάκης), and Nasos (Νάσος).

The female version of the name is Athanasia (Greek: Αθανασία), shortened to Sia (Σία; which may also be a diminutive of Anastasia, Dionysia, etc.)

Forms in other languages: Atanas, Atanasie, Atanasije, Afanasy, Atanase, Athanase, Atanasio, Opanas, Panas.

Derived surnames: Athanasiadis, Atanasijević, Atanasiu/Athanasiu Atanasescu, Afanasyev, Afanasenko/Afanasenkov, Afonin, Apanasenko/Opanasenko/Panasenko, Atanasov, Tănase.

Notable people with this name include:

== Religious figures ==
- Athanasius of Alexandria (c. 296/298–373), Christian saint, Coptic pope, theologian
- Athanasius (died 320), one of the Forty Martyrs of Sebaste
- Athanasius of Alexandria (presbyter) (fl. 5th century)
- Pope Athanasius II of Alexandria (died 496), Coptic pope from 490 to 496
- Athanasius I Gammolo (died 631), Syriac Orthodox Patriarch of Antioch and head of the Syriac Orthodox Church of Antioch from 595 to 631
- Athanasius II Baldoyo (died 686), Syriac Orthodox Patriarch of Antioch and head of the Syriac Orthodox Church from 683 to 686
- Athanasius Sandalaya, Patriarch of Antioch, and head of the Syriac Orthodox Church from 756 until 758
- Athanasius I (bishop of Naples) (died 872), Italian bishop
- Athanasius of Naples (died 898), bishop and Duke of Naples
- Athanasius IV of Salh (died 1002), Patriarch of Antioch, and head of the Syriac Orthodox Church from 986 until his death
- Athanasius the Athonite (c. 920 – c. 1003), Byzantine monk and saint who founded the monastic community on Mount Athos
- Athanasius VI bar Khamoro (died 1129), Patriarch of Antioch, and head of the Syriac Orthodox Church from 1091 until his death
- Pope Athanasius III of Alexandria, Coptic pope from 1250 to 1261
- Athanasius I of Constantinople (1230–1310), Ecumenical Patriarch of Constantinople and Eastern Orthodox saint
- Patriarch Athanasius III of Alexandria, Greek Patriarch of Alexandria between 1276 and 1316
- Athanasius the Meteorite (1302–1380), Greek monk who founded the Monastery of Great Meteoron in Meteora, Greece
- Patriarch Athanasius IV of Alexandria, Greek Patriarch of Alexandria between 1417 and 1425
- Athanasius II of Constantinople, last Greek Patriarch (1450–1453) of an independent Constantinople
- Athanasius, Metropolitan of Moscow (died in the 1570s), Metropolitan of Moscow and all Russia from 1566 to 1568, writer and icon painter
- Athanasius II Dabbas (died 1619), Greek Patriarch of Antioch from 1611 to his death
- Athanasius of Brest (died 1648), Lithuanian martyr of the Orthodox Church
- Athanasius III of Constantinople (1597–1654), Patriarch of Constantinople in 1634, 1635 and 1652
- Athanasius III Dabbas (1647–1724), Greek Patriarch of Antioch and Archbishop of Cyprus
- Athanasius IV of Constantinople, Ecumenical Patriarch of Constantinople in 1679
- Athanasius of Attalia (died 1700), Orthodox martyr of Smyrna
- Athanasius V of Constantinople, Greek Patriarch of Constantinople from 1709 to 1711
- Athanasios Parios (1722–1813), Greek hieromonk, theologian, philosopher, educator and hymnographer
- Athanasius V Matar, Patriarch of the Melkite Greek Catholic Church for a few months in 1813
- Archimandrite Averchie (Athanasios Giatsou Bountas; 1806/1818–?), Aromanian monk and schoolteacher
- Athanasius Schneider (born 1961), Roman Catholic bishop
- Athanasiy Velyki (1918–1982), Ukrainian Basilian priest, historian, member of the Shevchenko Scientific Society

== Academics ==
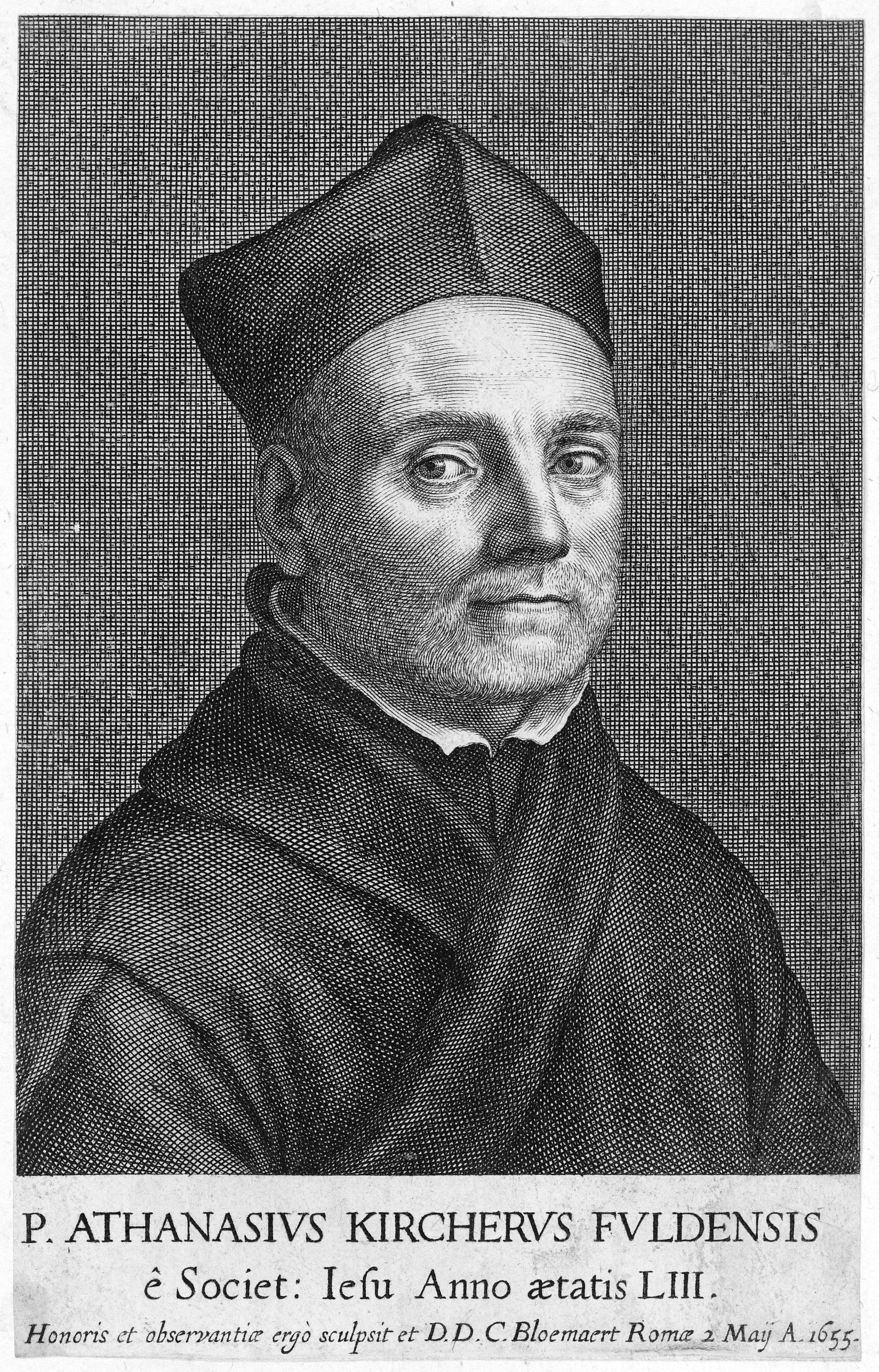
Athanasius Kircher

- Athanasios Angelopoulos (born 1939), Greek professor of theology
- Athanasios Asimakopulos (1930–1990), Canadian economist
- Athanasios Kafkalides (1919–1989), Greek neuropsychiatrist
- Athanasius Kircher (1602–1680), German Jesuit scholar and polymath
- Athanasios Moulakis (1945–2015), Greek Professor of Government
- Athanasios Psalidas (1767–1829), author, scholar and one of the most renowned figures of the modern Greek Enlightenment
- Athanasios Stageiritis (fl. 19th century), professor of Greek language at the Imperial Academy in Vienna
- Athanasios Pantelous (born 1978), Greek associate professor in actuarial science and financial mathematics

== Soldiers, revolutionaries and politicians ==
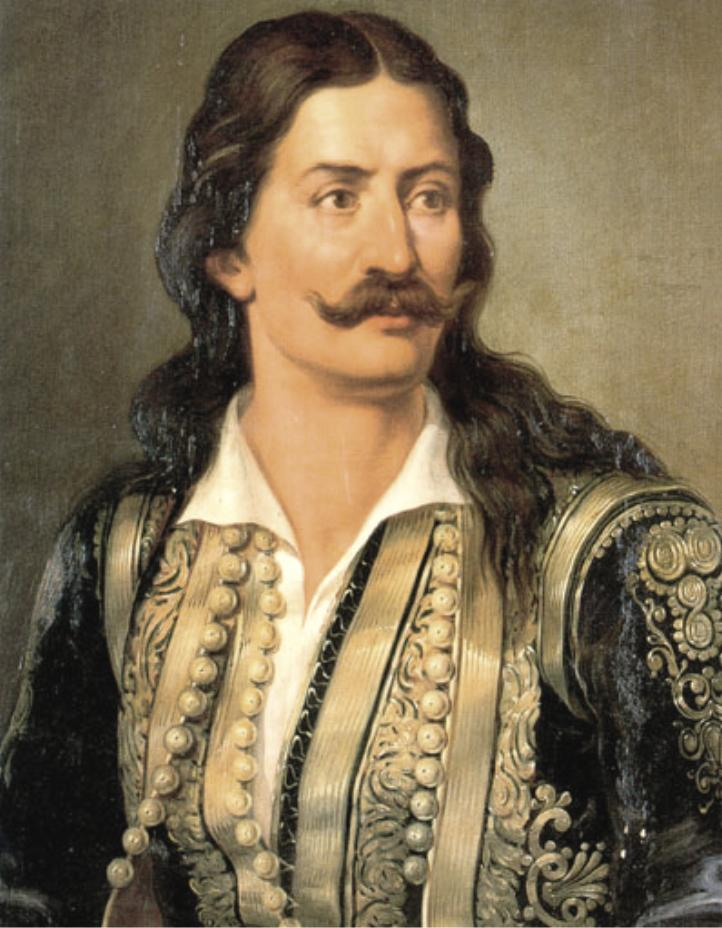
Athanasios Diakos

- Athanasios Diakos (1788–1821), Greek military commander during the Greek War of Independence
- Athanasios Dimitrakopoulos (1936–2022), Greek politician
- Athanasios Eftaxias (1849–1931), former Prime Minister of Greece
- Athanasios Exadaktylos (1869–1936), Greek Army general
- Athanasios Frangou (1864–1923), Greek Army officer
- Athanasios Kanakaris (1760–1824), Greek revolutionary and politician
- Athanasios Kanakaris-Roufos (1830–1902), politician, mayor of the city of Patras
- Athanasios Kanellopoulos (1923–1994), Greek politician, Deputy Prime Minister of Greece (1990–1992)
- Athanasios Klaras (1905–1945), military leader of ELAS (nom de guerre Aris Velouchiotis)
- Athanasios Miaoulis (1815–1867), former Prime Minister of Greece
- Athanasios N. Miaoulis (1865–1936), former mayor of Piraeustu
- Thanos Mikroutsikos (1947–2019), Greek songwriter and politician
- Atanas Paparizov (born 1951), Bulgarian politician and Member of the European Parliament
- Athanasios Pipis (died 1821), revolutionary in the Greek War of Independence
- Thanos Plevris (born 1977), Greek politician
- Athanasios Roussopoulos (1903–1983), Greek politician
- Athanasios Tsakalov (died 1851), Greek revolutionary against Ottoman rule, co-founder of the Filiki Eteria secret revolutionary organization
- Athanasios Tsaldaris (1921–1997), Greek politician, Speaker of the Hellenic Parliament at various times from 1989 to 1993

== Artists and entertainers ==
- Athanasios Christopoulos (1772–1847), Greek poet
- Thanos Kalliris (born 1962), Greek pop singer
- Thanos Mikroutsikos (born 1947–2019), Greek songwriter and politician
- Panas Myrny (1849–1920), Ukrainian prose writer and playwright
- Thanos Petrelis (born 1975), Greek pop singer
- Sakis Tolis (born 1972), Greek musician best known as the vocalist and rhythm guitarist of Rotting Christ

== Athletes ==
- Athanasios Arthur Diles (born 1982), Australian soccer player and manager
- Athanasios Kostoulas (born 1976), Greek footballer
- Athanasios Mantzouranis (born 1982), Greek cyclist
- Athanasios Michalopoulos (born 1973), Greek beach volleyball player
- Athanasios Nanopoulos, Greek fencer
- Athanasios Protopsaltis (born 1993), Cypriot-born Greek volleyball player
- Athanasios Skaltsogiannis (born 1878, date of death unknown), Greek hurdler and long jumper
- Athanasios Skourtopoulos (born 1965), Greek basketball player
- Athanasios Stoikos (born 1988), Greek footballer
- Athanasios Tsigas (born 1982), Greek footballer
- Athanasios Vouros, Greek fencer
- Thanasis Antetokounmpo (born 1992), Greek basketball player
- Thanasi Kokkinakis, Australian tennis player

== Other ==
- Athanasios of Emesa, 6th-century Byzantine jurist
- Athanasius Scholasticus, Greco-Roman jurist
- Athanasius (praetorian prefect), 6th-century Byzantine official
- Afanasy Nikitin, Russian merchant, one of the first Europeans to travel to and document his visit to India. Died 1472.
- Athanasios Lefkaditis (1872–1944), founder of Greek Scouting
- Athanasios Papoulis (1921–2002), Greek-American engineer
- Athanasios Polychronopoulos (born 1984), Greek-American professional poker player
