= Afanasyev =

- Language: Russian

Origin
- Region of origin: Russia

Other names
- Variant form: Afanasyeva

Afanasyev (masculine; Афанасьев) or Afanasyeva (feminine; Афанасьева) is a Russian patronymic surname. It is derived from Afanasy, which is etymologically directly connected to Athanasios (Αθανάσιος), a Greek masculine first name that means "immortal". Notable people with the surname include:

- Aleksey Afanasyev (1850-c. 1920), Russian painter and illustrator
- Alexander Afanasyev (1826–1871), Russian folklorist
- Alexander Afanasyev-Chuzhbinsky (1817–1875), Russian/Ukrainian writer and ethnographer
- Aliona Afanasieva
- Anastasia Afanasieva
- Anatoly Afanasyev (1912–2003), Soviet army officer and Hero of the Soviet Union
- Boris Afanasiev
- Egor Afanasyev (born 2001), Russian ice hockey player
- Fyodor Afanasyev (1859–1905), Russian revolutionary
- Georgy Afanasyev (1906–1975), Soviet geologist and petrographer
- Mikhail Afanasyev (born 1986), Belarusian footballer
- Ivan Afanasyev (1901–1952), Soviet naval officer and Hero of the Soviet Union
- Irina Afanasieva
- Ksenia Afanasyeva (born 1991), Russian olympic gymnast
- Nicholas Afanasiev
- Nikolay Afanasyev (athlete) (born 1972), Russian Olympic athlete
- Nikolay Mikhaylovich Afanasyev (1916–2009), Russian firearms designer
- Nikolay Afanasyev (composer) (1820–1898), Imperial Russian violinist and composer
- Nikolay Fyodorovich Afanasyev (1918–1944), Soviet aircraft pilot and Hero of the Soviet Union
- Nikolay Nikolayevich Afanasyev (1893–1966), Russian Orthodox theologian
- Nina Afanasyeva (born 1939), Russian/Sami politician and language activist
- Nick Afanasiev
- Nikita Afanasiev
- Sergey Afanasyev (engineer) (1918–2001), Soviet engineer and space and defense industry executive
- Sergey Afanasyev (athlete) (born 1964), Russian middle-distance runner, in 1989 European Athletics Indoor Championships
- Sergey Afanasyev (racing driver) (born 1988), Russian racing driver
- Stepan Afanasyev (1894–1965), Soviet party figure
- Tatyana Afanasyeva (1876–1964), Russian/Dutch mathematician
- Valery Afanasyev
- Valery V. Afanasyev
- Vasily Afanasyev (1843–1913), prominent mechanical engineer of the Imperial Russian Navy
- Viktor Grigoryevich Afanasyev (1922–1994), Soviet/Russian journalist
- Viktor Mikhaylovich Afanasyev (born 1948), Soviet/Russian cosmonaut
- Yelena Afanasyeva (athlete) (born 1967), Russian track and field athlete
- Yelena Afanasyeva (politician) (born 1975), Russian politician
- Yevgeny Afanasyev (born 1947), Russian diplomat
- Yuri Afanasyev, (1934–2015), Russian historian and politician

== Other spellings ==
- Vahur Afanasjev (1979–2021), Estonian writer, filmmaker and musician
- Valērijs Afanasjevs (born 1982), Latvian footballer
- Valery Afanassiev (born 1947), Russian pianist
- Walter Afanasieff, Brazilian (of Russian descent) record producer and songwriter
