= Atanasie =

Atanasie is one Romanian form of Athanasios, used mainly as a male given name. It may refer to:

- Atanasie Anghel Popa (d. 1713), Romanian Greek-Catholic bishop in Transylvania
- Archimandrite Averchie (Atanasie Iaciu Buda; 1806/1818–?), Aromanian monk and schoolteacher
- Atanasie Marian Marienescu (1830-1915), ethnic Romanian Austro-Hungarian folklorist, ethnographer, judge
- Atanasie Popovici (c. 1887–1958), Serbian Romanian schoolteacher, minority rights activist and irredentist
- Atanasie Rednic (1722–1772), Primate of the Greek Catholic Church of the Romanians from Transylvania

== See also ==
- Atanasije
- Tănase, most common modern Romanian form of Athanasios; given name and surname
