= Coquerel =

Coquerel is a French surname. Notable people with the surname include:

- Athanase Laurent Charles Coquerel (1795–1868), French Protestant theologian
- Athanase Josué Coquerel (1820–1875), French Protestant theologian
- Charles Coquerel (1822–1867), French navy surgeon, algologist and entomologist
- Flora Coquerel (born 1994), French model
- Frédéric Coquerel (born 1978), French footballer
- Éric Coquerel (born 1958), French politician
