= Lefa =

Lefa or LEFA may refer to:

== Persons ==
- Lefa (rapper), member of French rap band Sexion d'Assaut
- Lefa Mokotjo, Lesotho ambassador and diplomat
- Lefa Tsutsulupa (born 1980), South African football (soccer) player

== Organizations ==
- Lesotho Football Association, LeFA

== Others ==
- Fa’ language, also known as Lefa
- Lefas, motorcycle brand
