= Tanase =

Tanase may refer to:

- the Romanian name and surname Tănase
- Tănase River, a river in Romania
- Tanasi, a Cherokee town near present-day Vonore, Tennessee
