= Athanase =

Athanase is a given name. Notable people with the name include:

- Athanase Apartis (1899–1972), Greek sculptor
- Athanase Auger (1734–1792), French educator, Hellenist and translator
- Athanase Bala (1927–2019), Cameroonian Catholic bishop
- Athanase Bassinet (1850–1914), French politician
- Athanase Coquerel (disambiguation)
- Athanase David (1882–1953), Canadian lawyer, politician, and businessman
  - Prix Athanase-David, annual literary award, part of the Prix du Québec
- Athanase Dupré (1808–1869), French mathematician and physicist
- Athanase Gaudet (1848–1888), Canadian farmer, merchant and political figure in Quebec
- Athanase Josué Coquerel (1820–1875), French Protestant theologian, son of Athanase Laurent Charles Coquerel
- Athanase Laurent Charles Coquerel (1795–1868), French Protestant theologian
- Athanase Seromba (born 1963), Rwandan priest found guilty of genocide and crimes against humanity committed in the Rwandan genocide
- Athanase-Charles-Marie Charette de la Contrie (1832–1911), French royalist military commander
- Charles Athanase Walckenaer (1771–1852), French civil servant and scientist
- Jean Charles Athanase Peltier (1785–1845), French physicist
- Antoine-Athanase Royer-Collard (1768–1825), French physician
- Jean-Athanase Sicard (1872–1929), French neurologist and radiologist
- Panayis Athanase Vagliano (1814–1902), Greek merchant and shipowner
