= Antanasijević =

Antanasijević (Serbian Cyrillic: Антанасијевић) is a Serbian surname, derived from the male given name Antanas, a variant of the name Anthony. It may refer to:

- Dragan Antanasijević (born 1987), Serbian football player
- Irina Antanasijević (born 1965), Russian philologist
- Nenad Antanasijević (born 1960), Serbian multimedial artist

== See also ==
- Atanasijević
- Anastasijević
