= Tasić =

Tasić (Serbian Cyrillic: Тасић) is a Serbian surname, derived from the given name Tasa, a diminutive of Atanasije (Athanasius).

== Geographical distribution ==
As of 2014, 94.3% of all known bearers of the surname Tasić were residents of Serbia (frequency 1:354), 1.8% of Kosovo (1:4,714), 1.4% of the Republic of Macedonia (1:6,862) and 1.3% of Bosnia and Herzegovina (1:12,494).

In Serbia, the frequency of the surname was higher than national average (1:354) in the following districts:

1. Pčinja District (1:56)
2. Jablanica District (1:78)
3. Nišava District (1:113)
4. Pomoravlje District (1:178)
5. Toplica District (1:227)
6. Zaječar District (1:243)
7. Podunavlje District (1:306)

== People ==
- Aleksandar Tasić (born 1988), Serbian footballer
- Ana Tasić (born 1978), Serbian theatre critic
- Ivan Tasić (born 1979), Serbian footballer
- Lazar Tasić (1931–2003), Serbian footballer

== See also ==
- Tasković
