= Thanos (name) =

Thanos (UK: /ˈθænɒs/, US: /-oʊs/; Greek: Θάνος [ˈθanos]) is a Greek masculine given name and surname, a short form (hypocorism) of Athanasios 'immortal'.

It may refer to the following:

== People ==
=== Given name or nickname ===
- Athanasios Thanos Samaras (born 1973), Greek actor and artist
- Athanasios Thanos Kalliris (born 1962), Greek singer
- Thanos Dokos (born 1965), Greek international relations scholar
- Thanos Leivaditis (1934–2005), Greek actor and screenwriter
- Athanasios Thanos Mikroutsikos (1947–2019), Greek composer and former politician
- Thanos Papalexis (born 1972), British businessman and convicted murderer
- Athanasios Thanos Petrelis (born 1975), Greek singer
- Athanasios Petsos (born 1991), Greek footballer
- Athanasios Thanos Plevris (born 1977), Greek politician
- Athanasios Thanos Stathakopoulos (born 1998), Greek entrepreneur in Europe

=== Surname ===
- George Spiro Thanos (born 1952), American martial artist
- Konstantinos Thanos (born 1973), Greek wrestler who participated in the 2000 Summer Olympics
- John Thanos (1949–1994), American convicted murderer
- Indradi Thanos (born 1953), Indonesian police officer
- F.E. Thanos (1921–2003), Indonesian army officer

== Fictional characters ==
- Thanos, a Marvel Comics supervillain
  - Thanos (Marvel Cinematic Universe), the Marvel Cinematic Universe version of the character
- Thanos, a major character in the French language comic book series Lanfeust of Troy
- Thanos (Squid Game), a character in season 2 of Squid Game

== See also ==
- Thanos simonattoi, a species of dinosaur
- Athanasius (given name), a list of people named Athanasius or Athanasios
