= Thanasis =

- Gender: Male
- Language: Greek

Origin
- Meaning: Eternal life

Other names
- Alternative spelling: Thanassis
- Variant form: Athanasios

Thanasis (Θανάσης) is a Greek given name, short for Athanasios (Αθανάσιος), which can mean "eternal life" or "immortal".

Notable people with the name Thanasis or Thanassis include:

- Thanasis Antetokounmpo (born 1992), Greek basketball player
- Thanasis Giannakopoulos (1931–2019), Greek businessman
- Thanasis Kanoulas (born 1992), Greek football player
- Thanasis Kolitsidakis (born 1966), Greek former footballer
- Thanassis Lefas, 20th and 21st century motorcycle engineer
- Thanasis Lightbridge (born 1978), Greek keyboard player and composer, founder of electronica art metal band Dol Ammad
- Thanasis Martinos (born 1950), Greek shipowner and real estate investor
- Thanasis Pafilis (born 1954), Greek politician and Member of the European Parliament
- Thanasis Paleologos (born 1977), Greek footballer
- Thanasis Papakonstantinou (born 1959), Greek singer-songwriter
- Thanasis Papazoglou (born 1988), Greek footballer
- Thanasis Sentementes (born 1975), Greek footballer
- Thanassis Skordalos (1920–1998), Cretan musician
- Thanassis Stephopoulos (1928–2012), Greek artist
- Thanassis Tsakiris (born 1965), biathlete and cross-country skier
- Thanasis Veggos (1927–2011), Greek actor

== See also ==
- Who Is Thanassis, a 1969 Greek film
- Thanasi Kokkinakis, Australian tennis player
