= Afanasy =

Afanasy (Russian: Афана́сий) is the Russian form of Athanasios, a Greek name meaning "immortal". It may refer to:

People:

- Afanasy Bagration, Prince Adarnase of Kartli (1707–1784), Georgian prince royal and Russian Empire general
- Afanasy Beloborodov (1903–1990), Russian general
- Afanasy Fet (1820–1892), Russian poet
- Afanasy Grigoriev (1782–1868), Russian architect
- Afanasy Gryaznov (1899–1969), Soviet army major general
- Afanasy Kovalyov (1903–1993), Soviet bureaucrat
- Afanasy Nikitin (died 1472), Russian merchant and traveler
- Afanasy Ordin-Nashchokin (1605–1680), Russian statesman
- Afanasy Razmaritsyn (1844–1917), Russian-Ukrainian painter
- Afanasy Safronov (1903–1944), Soviet army general
- Afanasy Seredin-Sabatin (1860–1921), Russian architect and journalist, first Western architect to live and work in the Korean Empire
- Afanasy Shchapov (1830–1876), Russian historian
- Afanasy Shilin (1924–1982), Soviet artilery officer

Fictional people:

- Afanasy Ivanovich Tovstogub, the main character of Nikolai Gogol's short story The Old World Landowners

Afanasy Nikolayevich Borschov, Main character in Georgiy Daneliya's 1975 film Afonya portrayed by Leonid Kuravlyov and works as a plumber

The surname Afanasyev (Russian: Афана́сьев) is derived from the name. The surname Afonin (Russian: Афо́нин) is derived from Afonya, the short form of the name.

== See also ==
- Afanasy Nikitin (icebreaker)
