= Thanos (disambiguation) =

Thanos is a Marvel Comics supervillain.

Thanos may also refer to:

- Thanos (Marvel Cinematic Universe), the Marvel Cinematic Universe version of the character
- Thanos (Squid Game), a character in the second season of Squid Game
- Thanos (name), a list of people with the given name and surname
- Thanos simonattoi, a Brazilian carnivorous dinosaur active during the Cretaceous Period

== See also ==
- Thanatos, Greek personification of death
