= Macrides =

Macrides, Makrides, Macridis, Makridis are transcriptions of the Greek surname Μακρίδης. Notable people with the surname include:

== Macrides ==
- Demetrios A. Macrides, Commissioner of the Scouts of Greece
- Ruth Macrides (1949–2019), Centre for Byzantine, Ottoman and Modern Greek Studies, University of Birmingham

== Makrides ==
- Constantinos Makrides (born 1982), Cypriot football player
- Maria Makrides, Australian academic, paediatrician and nutritionist

== Makridis ==
- Alexandros Makridis, former president (1963–66) of the AEK Athens F.C.
- Babis Makridis ( Μπάμπης Μακρίδης), Greek film director
- Charalambos Makridis, Greek-German footballer
- Theodoros Makridis, Greek resistance fighter, one of ELAS chief staff officers
- Theodoros Makridis (Θεόδωρος Μακρίδης), known as Theodore Makridi (1872–1940), Ottoman and Turkish - Greek archaeologist
- Vasilios Makridis (born 1939), Greek alpine skier
