= Athan =

- Gender: Male

Origin
- Origin: Greek
- Meaning: Immortal/Eternal Life
- Region of origin: Greece

Other names
- Related names: Athanasius

Athan is a Greek male given name, which means "eternal life" or "immortal" or "rising sun". It can be a variant of Athanasios, and is of rising popularity among younger Greek parents in the Diaspora. The name Athan may refer to:

== People ==
- Athan Catjakis (1931-2022), American politician
- Athan Iannucci (born 1982), Canadian lacrosse player
- Athan Kaliakmanis (born 2003), American football player
- Athan Karras (1927–2010), American dancer
- Athan Theoharis (1936–2021), American historian

== See also ==
- Athanase
- Athanasius (disambiguation)
- Ethan
- St Athan
