= Athanase Coquerel =

Athanase Coquerel may refer to:

- Athanase Laurent Charles Coquerel (1795–1868), French Protestant theologian
- Athanase Josué Coquerel (1820–1875), French Protestant theologia, son of Athanase Laurent Charles Coquerel
