= Nikolay Afanasyev =

Nikolay Afanasyev may refer to:

- Nicholas Afanasiev
- Nikolay Afanasyev (athlete) (born 1972), Russian Olympic athlete
- Nikolay Mikhaylovich Afanasyev (1916–2009), Russian firearms designer
- Nikolay Afanasyev (composer) (1820–1898), Imperial Russian violinist and composer
- Nikolay Fyodorovich Afanasyev (1918–1944), Soviet aircraft pilot and Hero of the Soviet Union
- Nikolay Nikolayevich Afanasyev (1893–1966), Russian Orthodox theologian
