= Atanasio =

Atanasio is a masculine given name which may refer to:

- Atanasiu di Iaci (Atanasio in Italian), 13th century Italian Benedictine monk and historiographer
- Atanasio Aguirre, President of Uruguay from 1864 to 1865
- Atanasio Bello Montero (1800–1876), Venezuelan musician
- Atanasio Bimbacci (c. 1654–1734), Italian painter of the Baroque period
- Atanasio Amisse Canira (born 1962), Mozambican Roman Catholic Bishop of Lichinga
- Atanasio Echeverría y Godoy, late 18th-century Mexican botanical artist and naturalist
- Atanasio Girardot (1791–1813), Colombian revolutionary leader
- Atanasio Ndongo Miyone (died 1969), musician from Equatorial Guinea, lyrics writer of the national anthem
- Atanasio Monserrate (fl. 2002-present), Indian politician
