= Christos Lygeros =

Former chairman of the Scouts of Greece

- Χρίστος Λυγερός

Chairman of the National Board of the Scouts of Greece

Christos Lygeros (Greek: Χρίστος Λυγερός; born 1955) served as the Chairman of the National Board of the Scouts of Greece, as well the Chairman of the World Adult Resources Committee of the World Scout Committee and a member of the Global Education Committee.

For his contribution to the Scout Movement, national and international, he has been honored with the Scout Badge of the Silver Palm of the SEP (2002) and in 2005, Lygeros was awarded the 306th Bronze Wolf, the only distinction of the World Organization of the Scout Movement, awarded by the World Scout Committee for exceptional services to world Scouting. In addition he has been thanked by the Minister for Migration Policy for providing volunteers to address and support the influx of refugees during the European refugee crisis.

He is the associate director of Compliance Division of Alpha Bank, a graduate of the University of Piraeus Economics Department, Master's in Business Administration of the Athens University of Economics, Degree in Marketing, and Specialization Certificate in Corporate Governance in the Regulatory Compliance and Prevention of Money Laundering. He has extensive teaching experience in banks and organizations since 1985 in the areas of Administration, Marketing, Development of Human Resources and Training of Trainers. He was a member of the Working Group (1998 - 2001) of the Greek Banking Institute of the Greek Union of Banks for the development of education programs.

He joined Scouting in 1965. He was a Cub Scout, Scout, Rover, and adult leader undertaking various tasks at local and national level, where he held the position of Financial Director, General Superintendent and board president. He participated actively in the modernization of the program since 1981, and the institutional framework of the Scout Movement in three revisions of the SEP Statute in 1991, 1999 and 2011.
