= Analecta Ordinis S. Basilii Magni =

Monastic order publication founded 1924

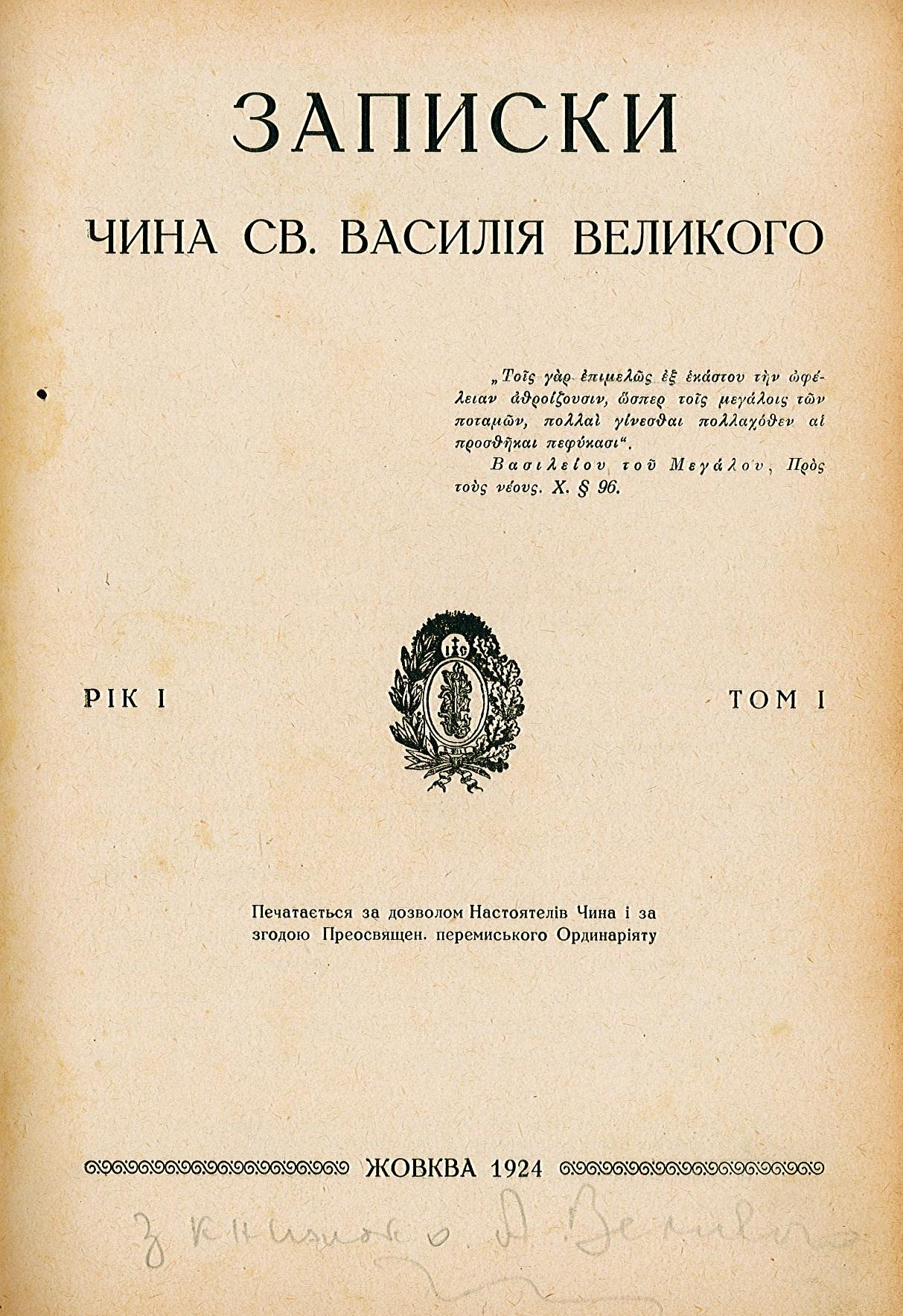
- Editor-in-chief: Rev Josafat Skruten (founder), Rev Athanasiy Velyki
- Editor: Order of Saint Basil the Great
- Founded: 1924
- Language: Ukrainian, Latin, Italian, English, Polish
- Headquarters: Zhovkva, Lviv, Rome

Analecta Ordinis S. Basilii Magni (AOSBM, Analecta OSBM - Transactions of the Order of Saint Basil the Great, Ukrainian: Записки Чина св. Василія Великого) is an irregular scholarly publication of the Basilian monastic order, first published in Zhovkva and Lviv (1924-1939), then in Rome (as a second series, commencing in 1949).

== History and profile ==
The first editor of Analecta was Josafat Skruten. Six volumes were published by 1939. The second series of Analecta, under the editorship of Athanasiy Velyki, consisted of 103 volumes by 1979 (in 2018—127 volumes) and was divided into three sections: (1) works—monographs (40 vols; 57 vols in 2018); (2) transactions of the Order of Saint Basil the Great—articles, reviews, bibliographies, and other materials (15 vols); (3) documents—a systematic publication of materials from the Vatican Archives (55 vols) concerning the history of Ukraine, including two large volumes entitled Documenta Pontificum Romanorum historiam Ucrainae illustrantia 1075–1953 (1953–1954).
