= Opanas =

Ukrainian form of the given name Athanasius.

- Opanas Slastion (1855–1933), Ukrainian artist and ethnographer
- Opanas Slastion (1855–1933), Ukrainian artist and ethnographer

== See also ==
- Panas
