= Athanasiadis =

Athanasiadis or Athanasiades (Greek: Αθανασιάδης) is a Greek surname. The female version of the name is Athanasiadi (Αθανασιάδη) or Athanasiadou (Αθανασιάδου). Athanasiadis is a patronymic surname which literally means "the son of Athanasios (Thanasis)". Notable individuals include:

- Anestis Athanasiadis (born 1972), Greek footballer
- Christos Athanasiadis (footballer, born 1978), Greek footballer
- Christos Athanasiadis (footballer, born 1979), Greek footballer
- Emmanouela Athanasiadi (born 1965), Greek equestrian
- Georges Athanasiadès (1929–2022), Swiss organist and choirmaster
- Georgios Athanasiadis-Novas (1893–1987), Greek lawyer, politician and Prime Minister
- Georgios Athanasiadis (wrestler) (born 1962), Greek wrestler
- Georgios Athanasiadis (footballer, born 1963), Greek footballer
- Georgios Athanasiadis (footballer, born 1993), Greek footballer
- Iason Athanasiadis, British-Greek writer, photographer, political analyst and TV producer
- Marios Athanasiadis (born 1986), Cypriot biker
- Prodromos Bodosakis-Athanasiadis, Greek businessman
- Stefanos Athanasiadis (born 1988), Greek footballer
