= Leonidas J. Skyrianidis =

- Λεωνίδας Σκυριανίδης

Headquarters Commissioner of the Scouts of Greece

Leonidas J. Skyrianidis (Greek: Λεωνίδας Σκυριανίδης) served as the Headquarters Commissioner of the Scouts of Greece.

In 1974, Skyrianidis was awarded the 90th Bronze Wolf, the only distinction of the World Organization of the Scout Movement, awarded by the World Scout Committee for exceptional services to world Scouting.
