= Scouts of Greece =

National Scouting Association of Greece

- Country: Greece
- Founded: 1910; 116 years ago
- Founder: Athanasios Lefkaditis
- Membership: 20.000
- Chief Commissioner: Stelios Nikogiannis
- Chief Executive & Permanent Assistant Chief Commissioner: Konstantinos Bazas
- Administrative Council President: Christoforos Mitromaras
- Affiliation: World Organization of the Scout Movement
- Website sep.org.gr

Scouts of Greece or Soma Hellinon Proskopon (Σώμα Ελλήνων Προσκόπων, ΣΕΠ) is the National Scouting Association of Greece and is the World Organization of the Scout Movement's recognized member organization for Greece. Scouts of Greece was founded in 1910 and is a founding member of the World Organization of the Scout Movement that was established in 1922. The association, as of 2018 has approximately 20,000 members and is amongst the largest youth organizations in Greece.

Soma Hellinon Proskopon is a Non-Governmental Organization that is being governed by 15 member administrative council, which is elected every 4 years by the General Assembly representing Scouts from all the regions in Greece and abroad. Scouts of Greece operate under the auspices of the Greek Ministry of Education, Religious Affairs and Sports.

== History ==
During the 1908 Summer Olympics, in London, Athanasios Lefkaditis, a young physical education teacher, observed with interest the British Scouts' service and activities at the Games. He met with Robert Baden-Powell and shortly after, introduced Scouting in Greece in 1910. Ever since, Scouts of Greece has been active in social welfare and relief activities during natural disasters such as great fires and earthquakes.

In October 1910, the first Greek Boy Scout Squad was founded. Society was watching the steps of the movement with great interest. In the beginning of 1911, K. M. Melas, G. Panas and N. Paspatis, officers in the Royal Hellenic Navy and Filippos Xrisovelonis, banker, joined the Hellenic Scout movement, supported it, constituted its First Managing Committee and later become members of the Executive Board of "Omilos Hellinon Proskopon" ("Association of Greek Scouts") as the corps was initially called. In March 1912 there were 128 Boy Scouts in Greece. In the beginning of 1913, Markos Mindler established the first team of Sea Scouts.

The first official public appearance of the Boy Scouts took place during the Grand Parade for the National Independence Day, on March 25, 1912. The Boy Scouts marched in front of the officials at the entrance of the "Zappeio" mansion, in front of George I of Greece, the Greek Royal Family, the Board of Ministers under Prime Minister Eleutherios Venizelos and other authorities.

The Greek Scouts offered precious services to the Country during the Balkan Wars. The elder, after receiving special training from army's officers, were used as trainers of the recruits and couriers of the General Army Staff. The younger Scouts served as corpsmen in Athens hospitals, nurses' aides, storekeepers, even general aides to the injured. The elder were even named corporals, with a right to bear the corresponding insignia on their scout uniform. Also, in 1914, Constantine I of Greece assumed General Leadership of the corps of Boy Scouts of Greece.

In 1963 it organized successfully the 11th World Scout Jamboree in Marathon, close to Athens. Also in 2002, it hosted the 36th World Scout Conference in Thessaloniki.

In 2016 Refugee crisis, Greek scouts became well known, where numerous volunteers spent more than 52000 hours of service in their local communities supporting refugees and migrants, mostly families, and welcoming them. Mostly because of their work in refugee camps around the mainland but especially in the island of Lesbos and Chios Scouts of Greece received attention from international media as well as public figures such as Ban Ki Moon, UN Secretary General.

In 2020, Scouts of Greece celebrated their 110th anniversary.

== Program ==
The Scouts of Greece program is based on the Scout method principles that children can more easily acquire skills through experience than through structured training. The young people plan their own progressive development by choosing from a variety of programs and activities according to their needs and interests. It exists in all the big cities of Greece and most of the Greek islands and rural areas of the country.

Scouts are official ambassadors of the Sustainable Development Goals (SDGs)

== Ideals ==
=== Scout Motto ===
The Scout Motto is Έσo Έτοιμος (Éso Étimos), which translates to Be Prepared in Greek. The ancient Greek moto Αιέν Αριστεύειν (Modern Greek: Eén Aristévin, Ancient Greek: Aièn Aristeúein), Forever Excelling in Greek, found in Homer's Iliad, is also used as a National Scout Motto.

=== Emblem ===
The Scout emblem incorporates a phoenix, the mythic bird symbolizing rebirth, allegory to the creation of the modern Greek nation.

=== Scout Promise ===
I promise upon my honour
to perform my duty towards God and my Country
to help any person at any occasion
and uphold the Scout Law.

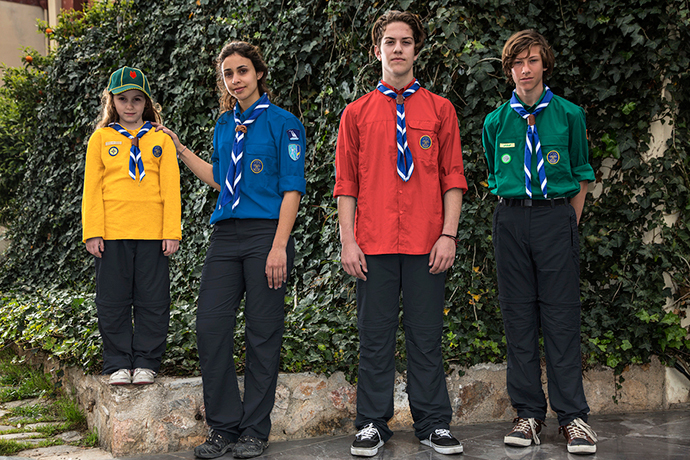
New design of the Scouting Uniform in Greece.

=== Scout Law ===
1. A Scout speaks the truth and keeps his word.
2. A Scout is just, trustworthy, knows how to discipline and uphold the Laws.
3. A Scout is useful to his family and society.
4. A Scout is friendly and polite towards everyone and a brother to each Scout.
5. A Scout respects himself and others, minds his words and actions.
6. A Scout loves nature and protects the environment.
7. A Scout is cheerful and optimistic.
8. A Scout is provident and takes care to make good use of time.
9. A Scout is hard-working and progresses with his own abilities.
10. A Scout is decisive, courageous and confident and takes responsibility of his actions.

== Distinguished members ==
A. E. Benakis was a member of the World Scout Committee of the World Organization of the Scout Movement from 1949 until 1951, and Demetrios Alexatos served on the Committee from 1957 to 1963. In 1963, Alexatos was awarded the Bronze Wolf, the only distinction of the World Organization of the Scout Movement, awarded by the World Scout Committee for exceptional services to World Scouting. Other Scouts Organization of Greece recipients include Demetrios A. Macrides in 1967, Leonidas J. Skyrianidis in 1974, Costas Tsantilis in 2004, Christos Lygeros in 2005, and Christos Papageorgiou (Scouting) in 2016.

== Greek Scouting abroad ==
Scouts of Greece are also active in Egypt and Paris as of 2025. These groups form a special region within Scouts of Greece's structures.
