= Athanasiu =

Athanasiu is a Romanian surname. Notable people with the surname include:

- Alexandru Athanasiu (born 1955), Romanian politician and jurist
- Sava Athanasiu (1861–1946), Romanian geologist and paleontologist
- Esmeralda Athanasiu-Gardeev (1834–1917), Romanian pianist and composer

== See also ==
- Athanasiou
- Atanasiu
