= Afanasenko =

Afanasenko (Ukrainian: Афанасенко) is a Ukrainian surname. Notable people with the surname include:

- Alexei Afanasenko (1925–1972), full Cavalier of the Order of Glory
- Ivan Afanasenko (1923–1975), a Hero of the Soviet Union
- Yury Afanasenko (1973-), a Belarusian professional football coach

== See also ==
- Apanasenko
