= Costas Tsantilis =

Greek politician (born 1944)

Costas Tsantilis (Greek: Κώστας Τσαντίλης; born 1944) was a Greek politician who served as the International Commissioner and Chief Commissioner of the Scouts of Greece, as well as a member of the World Scout Committee.

In 2004, Tsantilis was awarded the 303rd Bronze Wolf, the only distinction of the World Organization of the Scout Movement, awarded by the World Scout Committee for exceptional services to world Scouting.
