= Afonin =

Afonin (Russian: Афо́нин) is a Russian surname derived from Afonya, a short form of the name Afanasy. The surname literally means Afonya's. It may refer to:

- Mikhail Afonin (1957–2025), Russian football coach
- Vadim Afonin (born 1987), Uzbek-Russian footballer
- Valentin Afonin (1939–2021), Soviet footballer
- Vasily Afonin (1919–1996), Soviet military aviator
- Vyacheslav Afonin (born 1978), Russian football coach
- Yury Afonin (born 1977), Russian politician
