= Apanasenko =

Apanasenko and Opanasenko are Ukrainian patronymic surnames derived from the given name Apanas/Opanas.

- Dmitry Apanasenko, Russian water polo player
- Iosif Apanasenko (1890–1943), Soviet army general
- Oleksandr Opanasenko, Ukrainian politician
- Yevhen Opanasenko, Ukrainian footballer
- Hanna Opanasenko, birth name of Hanna Sumska, Ukrainian actress

== See also ==
- Afanasenko, Afanasenkov
- Panasenko
