= Panas =

Panas is a Greek (Πανάς) or Slavic surname or a given name. It may be a Belarusian or Ukrainian form (Панас) of the given name Athanasius. Notable people with the name include:

== Given name ==
- Panas Fedenko (1893–1981), Ukrainian politician, historian, and revolutionary
- Panas Liubchenko (1897–1937), Ukrainian revolutionary and Soviet politician
- Panas Myrny, Ukrainian author
- Panas Saksahansky (1859–1940), Ukrainian theatre actor, playwright and translator

== Surname ==
- Chrysanthos Panas, Greek businessman
- Georgios Panas, Greek Navy officer
- Lydia Panas (born 1958), American photographer
- Marek Panas (born 1951), former Polish handball player
- Maria Costanza Panas, Italian nun and Venerated Catholic
- Marni Panas, Canadian LGBTQ activist
- Photinos Panas (1832–1903), Greek ophthalmologist
- Radosław Panas (born 1970), Polish volleyball player
- Vadym Panas (born 1985), Ukrainian footballer

== See also ==
- Pana (disambiguation)
