= Athanasia (given name) =

Athanasia is a Greek female given name, a counterpart of Athanasius (given name). Its diminutives include Sia. Notable people with the name include:

- Athanasia of Aegina
- Athanasia Alexopoulos
- Athanasia Anagnostopoulou
- Athanasia Fakidi
- Athanasia Moraitou
- Athanasia Perra
- Athanasia Pouridou
- Athanasia Totsidou
- Athanasia Tsoumeleka
