= Valery Afanasyev =

Soviet sailor

Personal information
- Nationality: Soviet Union
- Born: 25 January 1945 Arkhangelsk, Soviet Union
- Died: September 2022 (aged 77)
- Height: 1.75 m (5 ft 9 in)
- Weight: 79 kg (174 lb)

Sport
- Sport: Sailing

Valery Afanasyev (25 January 1945 – September 2022) was a Soviet sailor. He competed in the 1968 Summer Olympics.
