= Athanasiy Velyki =

The Very Reverend Athanasiy Velyki, OSBM
- Superior General of the Basilian Order of Saint Josaphat
- Installed: 1963
- Term ended: 1976
- Predecessor: Pavlo Myskiv
- Successor: Isidor Patrylo

Personal details
- Born: November 5, 1918 Turynka, Ukraine
- Died: December 24, 1982 (aged 64)
- Buried: Campo Verano, Rome, Italy
- Denomination: Ukrainian Greek Catholic
- Education: Ukrainian Free University, Pontifical Gregorian University

Athanasiy Velyki, O.S.B.M. (Ukrainian: Атанасій Григорій Великий; November 5, 1918 – December 24, 1982) was a Ukrainian Basilian priest, historian, member of the Shevchenko Scientific Society from 1953.

== Biography ==
Athanasiy Velyki, O.S.B.M., was born on November 5, 1918, in Turynka, Zhovkva county, Galicia. He joined the Basilian monastic order on August 31, 1933. He studied philosophy and theology in Krystynopil (1938–40) and at the Ukrainian Free University in Prague (PH D, 1944) and the Gregorian University in Rome (TH D, 1948). He also studied the history of the Eastern church at the Pontifical Oriental Institute (1946–8) and palaeography at the Vatican.

He was ordained on December 8, 1946. He was vice-rector (1948–53 and 1955–60) and prorector (1961–3) of Saint Josaphat's Ukrainian Pontifical College in Rome. From 1960 to 1965 Velyki served as president of the Ukrainian Theological Scholarly Society and secretary of the Vatican's Preconciliar and Conciliar Commission on the Eastern Churches. Thanks to his efforts the commission adopted a resolution on the need for establishing a Kyiv patriarchate. He was superior general (1963–76) and then consultant general of the Basilian monastic order. He was also a consultant to the Congregation for the Oriental Churches and the Commission for the Revision of the Canon Law of the Roman and Eastern Churches. He headed the Bible Commission of the Basilian monastic order that prepared the first Ukrainian translation of the Bible from the original languages.

== Writings ==
In 1949 Velyki revived and expanded Analecta Ordinis S. Basilii Magni. He published a number of important documentary collections:

- Actae S. Congregationis de Propaganda Fide, 1622–1862 (5 vols, 1953–5),
- Documenta Pontificum Romanorum Historiam Ucrainae Illustrantia, 1075–1953 (2 vols, 1953–4),
- Litterae S. Congregationis de Propaganda Fide, 1622–1862 (7 vols, 1954–7),
- Epistolae Metropolitarum Kioviensium Catholicorum, 1613–1839 (9 vols, 1956–80),
- Litterae Nuntiorum Apostolicorum, 1550–1900 (14 vols, 1959–77),
- Documenta Unionis Berestensis eiusque Auctorum, 1590–1600 (1970),
- Litterae Episcoporum, 1600–1900 (5 vols, 1972–81),
- Litterae Basilianorum, 1601–1760 (2 vols, 1979).

He established the series Ukrainska dukhovna biblioteka (The Ukrainian Spiritual Library), which published over 70 titles, 17 of which he wrote. His book on religious persecution in Ukraine, Bila knyha (The White Book, 1952), was translated into German, English, and Spanish. He also wrote a history of the Sisters Servants of Mary Immaculate (1968), Svitla i tini (Lights and Shadows, 1969), Ukraïns'ke khrystyianstvo (Ukrainian Christianity, 1969), and Z litopysu khrystyians'koï Ukraïny (From the Chronicle of Christian Ukraine, 9 vols, 1968–77). He contributed many entries to Entsyklopediia ukraïnoznavstva and Encyclopedia of Ukraine and drafted the missive from the Ukrainian Catholic church hierarchy on the anniversary of Saint Olha and the official statement issued by the Ukrainian bishops regarding the release from Siberia of Metropolitan Josyf Slipyj.
