= Aliona Afanasieva =

Ukrainian Russian pyramid player

Alena Afanasyeva
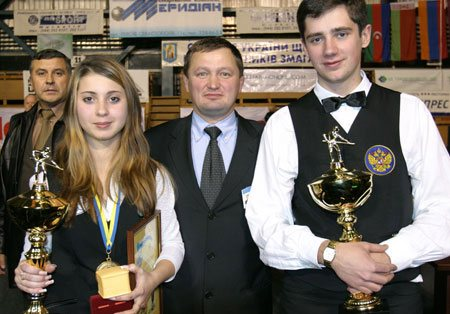
- Adanasyeva at the 2003 European Championships

Personal information
- Nationality: Ukrainian
- Born: Alena Igorevna Rusakova; 3 October 1987 (age 38) Kharkiv, Ukrainian SSR, Soviet Union

Pool career
- Country: Ukraine
- Sport: Russian pyramid
- Best finish: World Championship Runner-up (2005)

Alena Igorevna Afanasyeva (Алёна И́горевна Афана́сьева; née Rusakova; born 3 October 1987) is a Ukrainian professional Russian pyramid player. She is a two-time European Champion and a silver medalist at the World Russian Pyramid Championships.

Afanasyeva won her first European Championship title at the age of 16 in 2003 defeating Anna Maschirina in the final. In 2005, she reached the final of the World Pyramid Championship, finishing as the runner-up. She won her second European championship in 2008. She has also won eight Ukrainian national titles.

== Personal life ==
Afanasyeva graduated from the Kharkiv Institute of Banking of the University of Banking in 2009. She is married and has a daughter, Anna, born in 2010. She met her husband through the billiards circuit.

== Achievements ==
- World Championships:
  - Runner-up: 2005
- European Championships:
  - Winner: 2003, 2008
  - Runner-up: 2006
