= Nick Afanasiev =

Russian-born American actor

- Born: July 29, 1989 (age 36); Moscow, Soviet Union
- Occupation: Actor
- Years active: 2008–present
- Website: www.nickafanasiev.com

Nick Afanasiev (born July 29, 1989) is a Russian-born American actor, known for having the longest tongue in recorded history. Afanasiev's tongue is nine centimeters (3.54 inches) long, and is considered the longest tongue in America.

== Career ==
Afanasiev has appeared in independent films, television pilots, an episode of Animal Planet's Killer Outbreaks, and commercials for CCM Hockey Gear, Cornetto Ice Cream, and Mopar. In 2011, he starred in the Travis Fort film 2012: Ice Age. His tongue has been showcased on numerous television shows around the world. He performs tricks such as licking his elbow, licking his eye, text messaging with his tongue, and licking ice cream from the tip of his nose.

Afanasiev was born in Moscow, Russia, and moved to the United States at the age of seven. In 2008, a video featuring Afanasiev's tongue became an internet sensation. In addition to iCarly, Afanasiev has appeared on television shows around the world, including The Tyra Banks Show, Tonight Show with Jay Leno, and TruTV's Smoking Gun Presents.
