= Tănase =

Tănase, is a frequent Romanian surname, Romanian form of Athanasius (from the ancient Greek name: Athanasios, Αθανάσιος). Originally it was a given name with the form Atanase and Atanasie (Archaic Romanian) and then took the form of Tanase. Nowadays it occurs as both first name and surname. It may refer to:

- Alexandru Tănase (b. 1971), Moldovan politician
- Anca Tănase (b. 1968), Romanian rower
- Carmen Tănase (b. 1961), Romanian actress
- Cătălin Tănase (b. 1962), Romanian biologist
- Constantin Tănase (1880–1945), a key figure in the revue style of theater in Romania
- Cristian Tănase (b. 1987), Romanian footballer
- Florin Tănase (b. 1994), Romanian footballer
- Maria Tănase (1913–1963), Romanian singer of traditional and popular music
- Stelian Tănase (b. 1952), leading figure of Romanian civil society

== See also ==
- Atanase Sciotnic (1942–2017), ethnic Lipovan Romanian olympic canoeist
- Atanasescu, Romanian surname
- Tănase (river), in Bistrița-Năsăud County, Romania
