= Ivan Afanasenko =

Red Army sergeant

Ivan Prokofievich Afanasenko
- Иван Прокофьевич Афанасенко
- Born: 16 January 1923; Nizhny-Stebelevka village, Taman District, Kuban-Black Sea Oblast, RSFSR
- Died: 11 September 1975 (aged 51); Volgograd, Soviet Union
- Military career
- Allegiance: Soviet Union
- Branch: Red Army
- Service years: 1942–1946
- Rank: Sergeant
- Unit: 59th Guards Rifle Division
- Conflicts: World War II; Budapest Offensive
- Awards: Hero of the Soviet Union

Ivan Prokofievich Afanasenko (Russian: Иван Прокофьевич Афанасенко; 16 January 1923 – 11 September 1975) was a Red Army Sergeant and a Hero of the Soviet Union. Afanasenko was awarded the title Hero of the Soviet Union for reportedly crossing the Danube multiple times under fire between 4 December and 5 December 1944. Postwar, he worked as a tractor driver in Volgograd.

== Early life ==
Afanasenko was born on 16 January 1923 in Nizhny-Stebelevka village in the Taman District of the Kuban-Black Sea Oblast, in a family of peasants of Russian ethnicity. He graduated from elementary school and worked on the farm. He later became a hunter.

== World War II ==
In March 1942, Afanasenko was drafted into the Red Army. He was assigned to the 197th Rifle Division from 7 August. He fought in the Battle of Stalingrad, after which the division became the 59th Guards Rifle Division. Afanasenko later fought in Operation Gallop, the Donbass Strategic Offensive, the Zaporizhia Offensive, the Nikopol–Krivoi Rog Offensive, the Odessa Offensive, the Second Jassy–Kishinev Offensive, the Bucharest-Arad Offensive and the Battle of Debrecen. In 1944, Afanasenko joined the Communist Party of the Soviet Union. On 10 August, he was awarded the Order of the Red Star. On 28 October 1944, Afanasenko was awarded the Medal "For Courage". By December 1944, he was an Efreitor in the 66th Guards Separate Combat Engineer Battalion of the same division.

On the night of 4–5 December 1944, Afanasenko fought in the crossing of the Danube. He piloted a boat in the first wave of landings. Afanasenko reportedly made multiple crossings, some under enemy fire, bringing in reinforcements and taking out casualties in the bridgehead. On 24 March 1945, Afanasenko was awarded the title Hero of the Soviet Union and the Order of Lenin for his actions during the Danube crossing. During the Vienna Offensive, Afanasenko reportedly shot down a German aircraft with a machine gun on 10 April, for which he was awarded the Order of the Patriotic War 2nd class .

== Postwar ==
In 1946, Afanasenko was demobilized and returned to Krasnoarmeysky District. In 1947, he graduated from a mechanics' high school. Afterwards, he moved to Stalingrad, where he worked as a tractor driver. Afanasenko died on 11 September 1975 and was buried in Volgograd's Kirov Cemetery.
