= Atanasijević =

Atanasijević (Serbian Cyrillic: Атанасијевић) is a Serbian surname, a patronymic derived from Atanasije, the Serbian variant of Greek Athanasios. Atanasijević families may be found in all parts of Serbia as well as Montenegro, since it is believed that that is where they emigrated from. It may refer to:

- Aleksandar Atanasijević (born 1991), Serbian volleyballer
- Ksenija Atanasijević (1894–1981), Serbian philosopher
- Slavka Atanasijević (1850–1897), Serbian pianist and composer
- Sonja Atanasijević (born 1962), Serbian prose author and journalist
