= Athanasius of Alexandria (presbyter) =

5th century Christian clergy

Athanasius (Ancient Greek: Ἀθανάσιος, fl. 5th century AD) of Alexandria was a presbyter in that city, and a son of Isidora, the sister of Cyril of Alexandria. At the Council of Chalcedon in 451 AD, he presented a complaint against Pope Dioscorus I of Alexandria.

According to the complaint, Cyril had willed Athanasius and his relatives a large inheritance, but Dioscorus prevented them from receiving it after Cyril died in 444. He also threatened the lives of Athanasius and his brother Paul, and exiled them from Alexandria. They went to Constantinople, where, due to the rampant corruption at the time, they had to pay bribes in order to see a court. They borrowed 1400 pounds of gold from moneylenders at exorbitant rates to bribe Nomos, the magister officiorum and a friend of Chrysaphius, but despite the enormous bribe, they "never even saw the face of that barbarian Chrysaphius". Athanasius suspected that Dioscorus had sent Chrysaphius a letter asking him to "eliminate" Athanasius and Paul.

From that time onwards, Athanasius and Paul, along with their families, were put in custody and forced to hand over all their belongings to the moneylenders whom they owed. Paul died of the ill treatment they suffered. Athanasius then spent about seven years wandering from place to place, pursued by creditors and Dioscorus himself, and denied permission to lodge in churches or monasteries. He made his way to a suburb of Alexandria called Metanoia or Canopus, which was traditionally a place of asylum for refugees, and under the protection of the monastery of Tabenna. However, Dioscorus ensured that Athanasius could not use the public baths or have bread sent or sold to him, "his one aim being that we should perish from hunger and destitution". Dioscorus also had Athanasius' house in Alexandria turned into a church in order to deprive him of accommodation, and deprived him of his office by striking him off the list of clergy. Athanasius complained that he had been impoverished, forced to beg, and reduced to having a "mere" two or three slaves, far from the luxury he was previously accustomed to. He presented all this in his complaint at Chalcedon. Although Dioscorus was summoned multiple times to defend himself to these and other charges, he did not appear before the council.

Historians have generally been skeptical and unsympathetic to Athanasius' complaint. Richard Price and Michael Gaddis note that, by turning Athanasius' house into a church, Dioscorus was just treating it as church property, "which it originally may well have been". Cyril had been preceded as Pope by his uncle Theophilus, so their family had held the papacy for 60 years and may have been enriching themselves off church funds. Henry Chadwick described Athanasius as "impoverished by his own corrupt negotiations". Volker L. Menze explains that his removal was a "consequence of [his] misconduct", and that the 1400 pounds of gold he was forced to pay to Nomos were actually a fine for the crime of misappropriating church funds.
