= Athanasius of Attalia =

Smyrna Saint

Athanasius of Attalia (Greek: Αθανάσιος της Αττάλειας) was a Christian Neomartyr who lived in Smyrna in the 17th century. His feast day is celebrated on January 7.

== Martyrdom ==
He was a poor and simple man, but a convinced Christian. One day he entered into a religious dispute with a Turk. The Turk was educated and adroit with words, but Athanasius defended the Christian faith and argued its superiority over Islam. Finally, they parted.

On the next day, Athanasius was summoned to trial and met the Turk as his accuser. The judge called on Athanasius to repudiate Orthodox Christianity and accept Islam, as he had said that he would die before denying Christianity.

For this he was condemned to death and beheaded in the year 1700. His holy relics were buried in the Church of St. Paraskeva in Smyrna.
