= Vyacheslav Afonin =

Russian footballer and coach

Personal information
- Full name: Vyacheslav Viktorovich Afonin
- Date of birth: 5 February 1978 (age 48)
- Place of birth: Tyumen, Russian SFSR
- Height: 1.75 m (5 ft 9 in)
- Position: Midfielder

Youth career
- FC Geolog Tyumen

Senior career*
Years	Team	Apps	(Gls)
1995–1996	FC Dynamo-Gazovik Tyumen	5	(0)
1996	→ FC Dynamo-Gazovik-d Tyumen (loan)	2	(0)
1996–1998	FC Irtysh Tobolsk	45	(10)
1998–1999	FC Tyumen	24	(1)
2000	FC Baltika Kaliningrad	7	(0)
2000	FC Tyumen	13	(0)

Managerial career
- 2004–2018: FC Tyumen (academy)
- 2018–2019: FC Tyumen (assistant)
- 2019: FC Tyumen (caretaker)
- * Club domestic league appearances and goals

Vyacheslav Viktorovich Afonin (Russian: Вячеслав Викторович Афонин; born 5 February 1978) is a Russian football coach and a former player.
