= Atanasio Bello Montero =

Atanasio Bello Montero (born in Caracas) was a nineteenth-century Venezuelan composer and music educator.

== Career ==
Montero trained under Pedro Palacios y Sojo and founded an academy for music in Caracas with Luís Jumel in 1821. With José María Izáza he founded a philharmonic society in the same city in 1831. From 1834 he directed a music education institution founded by the Sociedad Económica de Amigos del País, and he founded Bogota's first opera company in 1847.

As a composer he is best known for his 1842 Vigil and Mass of the Dead, which were performed upon the transfer of Simon Bolivar's ashes to Caracas.
