= Atanasiu =

Atanasiu is a Romanian surname. Notable people with the surname include:

- Ion Atanasiu (1894–1978), Romanian chemist
- Teodor Atanasiu (born 1962), Romanian engineer and politician
- Vasile Atanasiu (1886–1964), Romanian general
- Virgil Atanasiu (born 1937), Romanian sports shooter

== See also ==
- Athanasiu
