= Athanasius Scholasticus =

Ancient Roman jurist

Athanasius Scholasticus was Graeco-Roman jurist who wrote scholia on the legal writer Eustathios Rhomaios after the publication of the Basilica. His date is unknown.
