= Lefa Mokotjo =

Lefa Joseph Mokotjo (Lefa J. Mokotjo) is a Mosotho diplomat and politician who served as ambassador of the Kingdom of Lesotho to the People's Republic of China from 1999 to 2005. He is the current Principal Secretary of the Ministry of Home Affairs and Public Safety for the Kingdom of Lesotho. In 2009 he led the Republic of South Africa-Lesotho Bilateral Task Team on the Facilitation of Movement of Citizens in Mohale, Lesotho, from 24 to 25 February 2009.

== Books ==
L.J Mokotjo (1986) 'Economics of replanting apple orchards under whole-block removal and interplant systems', Washington State University, Department of Agricultural Economics.
