= F. E. Thanos =

Indonesian military officer (1921–2003)

Frans Eddy Thanos
- Born: 19 November 1921; Purworejo, Central Java, Dutch East Indies
- Died: 4 December 2003 (aged 82)
- Allegiance: Japan (1943–1945); Indonesia
- Branch: Tokubetsu Keisatsutai (1943–1945); Indonesian Army (1945–????)
- Service years: 1943–????
- Rank: Major general
- Service number: 13009
- Education: Military Law Academy

Frans Eddy Thanos (commonly shortened to F. E. Thanos; 19 November 1921 – 4 December 2003) was an Indonesian army officer who served as the General Secretary of the Army Staff from 1960 until 1962. He wrote several books during his career in the army and became a candidate for the People's Representative Council in the 1999 Indonesian legislative election.

== Early life ==
Thanos was born on 19 November 1921 in Purworejo, Central Java. He attended the Police Academy in Palembang during the Japanese occupation of the Dutch East Indies and became a commander in the Tokubetsu Keisatsutai, a special police unit formed by the occupying Japanese Imperial Navy.

== Military career ==
After the independence of Indonesia, Thanos joined the Indonesian Army and became the chief of staff of a detachment in the 12th Military Police Battalion in Garut. He was promoted and became the commander of the detachment in 1947. A year later, the detachment was redeployed to guard the Nusa Kambangan prison.

Thanos was transferred to the 3rd Military Police Battalion in Bandung and became the battalion's chief of staff. He left the battalion in 1952 in order to study military law at the Military Law Academy. During his studies there, he became a member of the student senate. He graduated from the academy with a doctorandus. He was then appointed as the head of the legal bureau in the Ministry of Defense until 1958.

Following service in the Ministry of Defence, the army chief of staff appointed him as the Deputy General Secretary of the Army Staff in February 1960. He became general secretary later that year. He held the position for two years until he was rotated to the post of assistant officer in the army staff. He attended a brief course in the Indonesian Army Command and General Staff College for a few months in 1966.

Thanos was subsequently appointed as the deputy director for personnel in the Department of Defence and Security after finishing the course. With his position, Thanos was entrusted to chair the cadet selection commission in 1968. Thanos was promoted to the rank of brigadier general on 1 October 1970 and retired from the military with the rank of major general.

== Retirement ==
Thanos resided in South Jakarta after his retirement. He was nominated by the National Christian Party for a seat in the People's Representative Council in the 1999 Indonesian legislative election, but the party failed to win any seats in his constituency. He died on 4 December 2003 and was buried at the Kalibata Heroes' Cemetery.

== Works ==
- Thanos, F.E. (1954). Hukum Perang. Pembimbing.
- Thanos, F.E.; Juono (1961). Intelligence Militer. Djambatan.
