= Athanasiou =

Athanasiou is a Greek surname. Notable people with the surname include:

- Andreas Athanasiou (born 1994), Canadian ice hockey player
- Grigorios Athanasiou (born 1984), Greek footballer
- Kenneth R. Athanasiou (born 1967), Chief Information Security Officer of multiple global companies.
- Kyriacos A. Athanasiou (born 1960), Cypriot-American bioengineer
