= Afanasy Razmaritsyn =

Russian painter

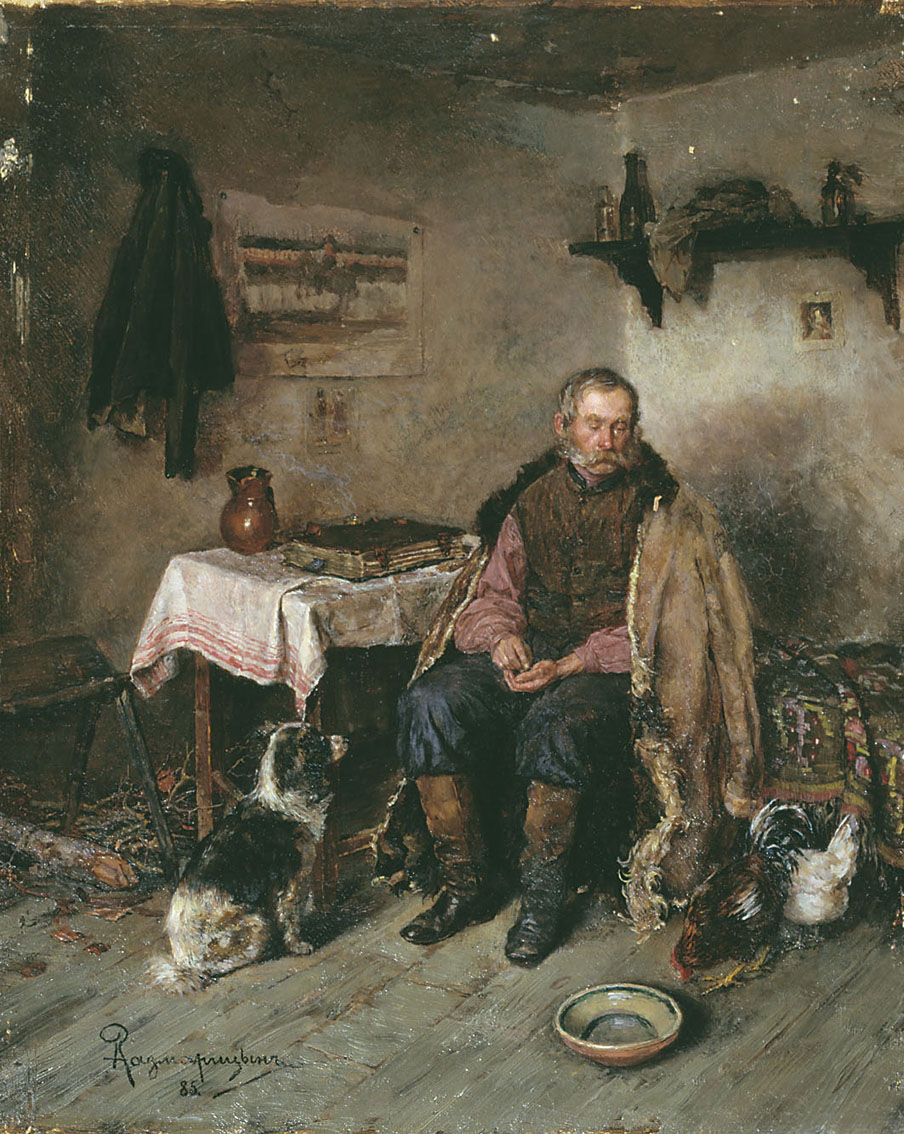
Retired Soldier

Afanasy Prokopievich Razmaritsyn (Russian: Афанасий Прокопиевич Размарицын; 1844 in Ukraine? – 1917 in Odessa) was a Russian-Ukrainian historical genre painter associated with the Peredvizhniki.

== Biography ==
He was born to a noble family, probably somewhere in Ukraine. Originally, he was employed at the Odessa office of the State Bank of the Russian Empire. He was fond of making pencil sketches of his friends, who told him he should take up art professionally. In 1874, he left the civil service and went to Düsseldorf, where he showed his work to Professor Eduard von Gebhardt, a Baltic-German who had studied in Saint Petersburg. On that basis, he was enrolled in the Academy of Arts. He apparently gave little time to his studies and was often ill.

After spending three years there, he took a trip through France and Italy and returned to Odessa in 1877. He lived in a hotel and supported himself by giving drawing lessons. He had his début in 1882, with a painting called "Requiem", at an exhibition of the Peredvizhniki. It was acquired by Pavel Tretyakov for his gallery.

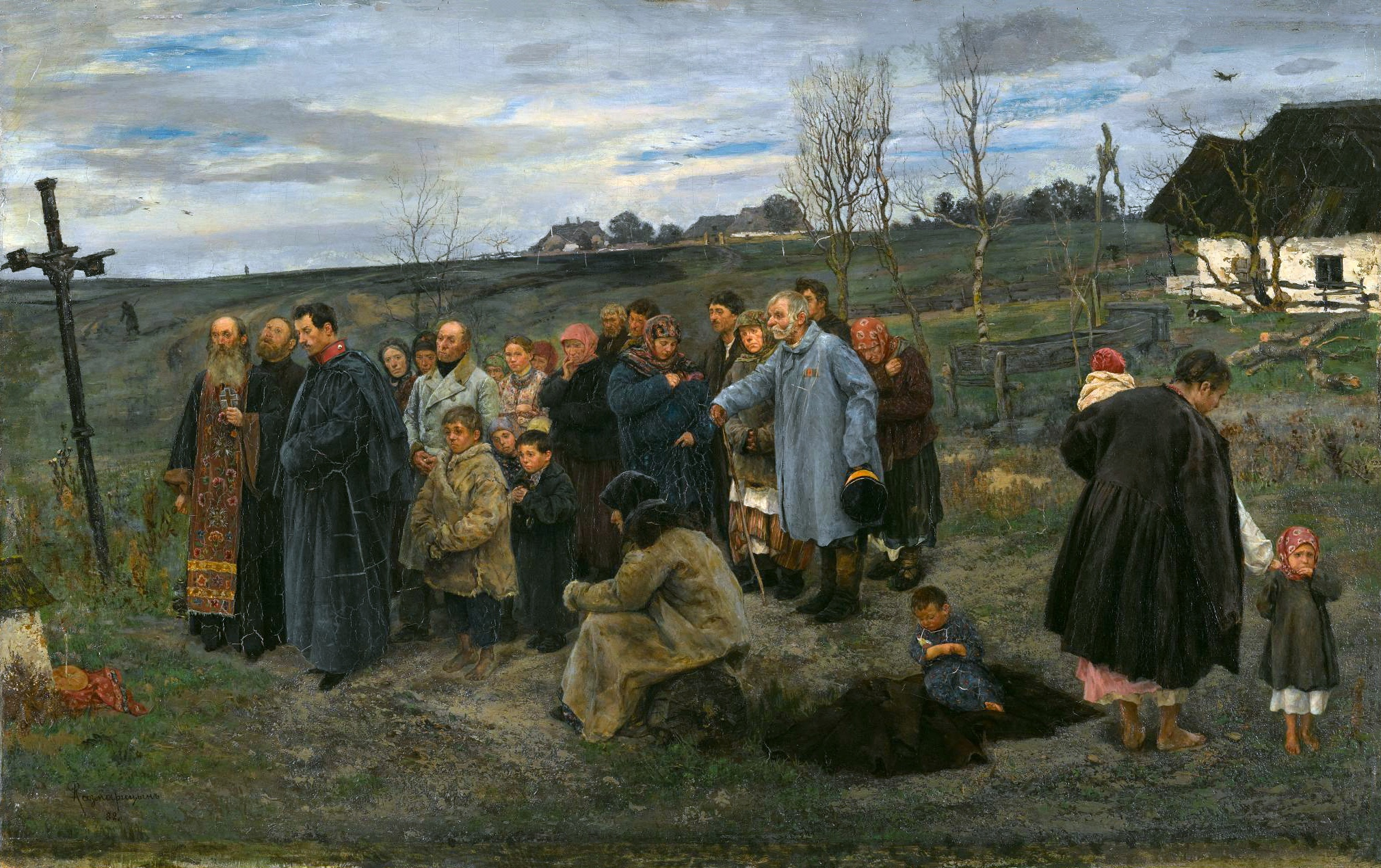
Requiem

His first solo exhibition was in 1884 and he held a major joint showing with Nikolai Bodarevsky in 1889. He participated in the Exposition Universelle (1900), became a full member of the Peredvizhniki in 1903, was named an honorary "Academician" by the Imperial Academy of Arts in 1910 and was one of the founders of the "Association of South Russian Artists". He dropped out of sight in 1916, and likely died the following year. The cemetery where he was buried was destroyed in 1935.

He worked very slowly, giving great attention to detail, and left relatively few works.
