= Athanasios Exadaktylos =

- Αθανάσιος Εξαδάκτυλος
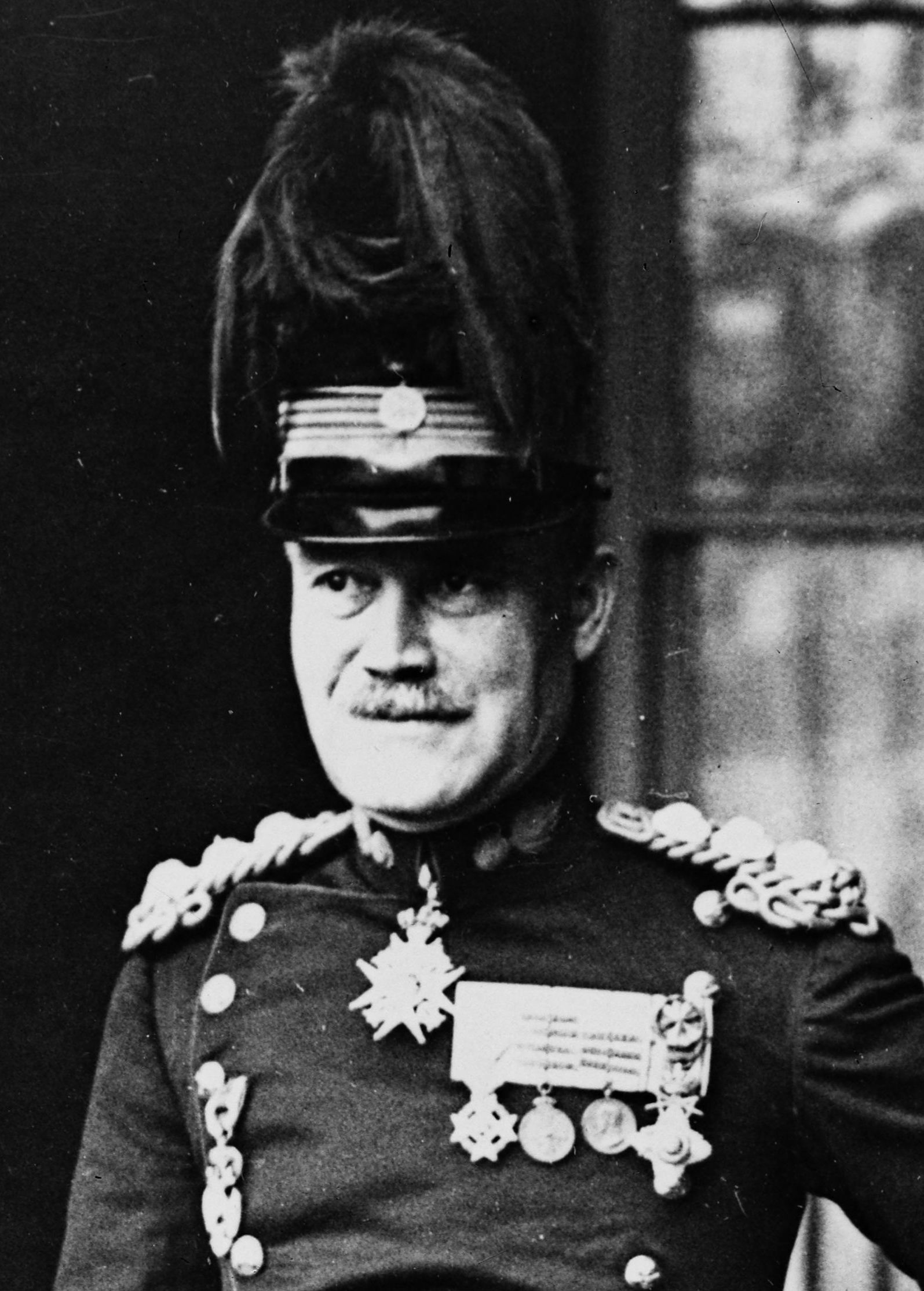
- Colonel Exadaktylos in the London Conference, February 1921
- Born: c. 1869; Andros, Kingdom of Greece
- Died: 1936
- Education: Hellenic Military Academy
- Military career
- Allegiance: Kingdom of Greece
- Branch: Hellenic Army
- Service years: 1891–1917; 1920–1923
- Rank: Major General
- Nickname: Antoniou (Αντονίου)
- Commands: Artillery battery Commander; Deputy Chief of the Army Staff Service; Chief of staff of the Interior Army
- Wars: Greco-Turkish War (1897); Macedonian Struggle; Balkan Wars; First Balkan War; Second Balkan War
- Awards: Order of the Redeemer; Order of St. Sava

Athanasios Exadaktylos (Greek: Αθανάσιος Εξαδάκτυλος, c. 1869–1936) was a Hellenic Army officer who rose to the rank of Major General and played an important role in the Macedonian Struggle and served in various high staff positions, including as Deputy Chief of the Hellenic Army General Staff.

== Life ==
He was born in the island of Andros in about 1869. He entered the Hellenic Military Academy and graduated on 8 August 1891 as an Artillery 2nd Lieutenant. In the Greco-Turkish War of 1897, he fought as a battery commander in Thessaly. From 1904 until its end in 1908, he participated in the Macedonian Struggle with the cover name Antoniou. He roamed across central Macedonia under various guises, among others a teacher or a salesman, working as a spy and liaison with Greek communities and armed bands.

During the Balkan Wars, he headed the Intelligence Bureau of the General Headquarters. His detailed maps, compiled during his journeys across Macedonia, proved invaluable during the war. Exadaktylos also served as a military expert in the Greek delegations to the London and Bucharest peace conferences. In 1915 he was appointed in the Intelligence and Civil Affairs Directorate of the General Staff. Due to his monarchist convictions, he sided against Eleftherios Venizelos during the National Schism and was dismissed from the army in 1917.

Following Venizelos' electoral defeat in November 1920, Exadaktylos was recalled to active service, promoted to major general and placed as Deputy Chief of the Army Staff Service. In 1921, he served briefly as Chief of Staff of the Interior Army, while the bulk of the Greek military was engaged in the Asia Minor Campaign. Following the Greek defeat in Asia Minor in August 1922 he was again dismissed and retired in 1923.

He died in 1936.
