= Constantin Atanasescu =

Romanian general (1885–1949)

- Born: April 24, 1885
- Died: 1949 (aged 63–64)
- Military career
- Allegiance: Romania
- Branch: Army
- Rank: Lieutenant general
- Conflicts: World War I World War II
- Awards: Order of the Crown (Romania), Grand Officer class

Constantin Atanasescu (24 April 1885 – 1949) was a Romanian lieutenant general during World War II. He retired in 1940, but was promoted to general in 1947 while in reserve.

After World War I, Atanasescu rose through the ranks of the Romanian Army; he was promoted to lieutenant colonel (1919), colonel (1923), brigadier general (1934), and major general (1939). From 1937 he was the Commanding Officer of the 6th Călărași Cavalry Regiment. In 1940, he became the Army's Inspector General of Cavalry.

On June 26, 1940, the Soviet Union demanded that the regions of northern Bukovina and Bessarabia be evacuated of all Romanian military personnel and civilian administration, and that the territories be ceded to the USSR. Due to overwhelming international pressure, the Romanian government was forced to accept the ultimatum, and the Soviet occupation of Bessarabia and Northern Bukovina commenced on June 28. During the retreat of the Romania Army from Bessarabia, Atanasescu abandoned his troops and fled to Galați; his actions were blamed on ethnic minorities, including Jews.

Also in June 1940, France capitulated to Nazi Germany. Later that summer, the pro-France Romanian government ceded Southern Dobruja to Bulgaria under the Treaty of Craiova and Northern Transylvania to Hungary under the Second Vienna Award. These events led to General Ion Antonescu coming to power as Conducător of Romania and President of the Council of Ministers in September 1940. After forcing King Carol II to abdicate, Antonescu used Decree Law No. 3,094 of 9 September 1940 to remove from the army Atanasescu and several other generals considered to be close to Carol II and accused of behaving inappropriately as high military commanders during the dramatic circumstances of the summer of 1940. The decree-law provided for the removal of several generals from the active ranks of the army with the following justification:

Considering that by flattery and methods incompatible with the dignity of a soldier they occupied high commands, then encouraged the frivolity and a lack of officer dignity; Considering that the incapacity of these general officers led to the demise of the army and to serious actions leading to the loss of the borders; Considering that an example of duty and responsibility must be set for the Nation by sanctioning those who have been guilty of these violations.

Antonescu fell from power on 23 August 1944, as a result of King Michael's Coup. The effects of the decree-law were annulled on 1 September 1944, and General Atanasescu was reinstated with full rights starting with the date of his retirement. He was then placed in reserve on the same day for old age, effective 24 April 1944. A royal decree of 4 October 1944 annulled the effects of the decree of transfer to the reserve and elevated him to the rank of general of army corps, effective 24 January 1942.

== Awards and honors ==
- Grand Officer of the Order of the Crown of Romania (8 June 1940)
