= Atanasescu =

Atanasescu is an Aromanian and Romanian patronymic surname derived from the given name Atanas. Notable people with this surname include:

- Constantin Atanasescu (1885–1949), Romanian World War II lieutenant general
- Dimitri Atanasescu (1836–1907), Aromanian teacher at the first Romanian school for the Aromanians in the Balkans
