= Alexander Afanasyev-Chuzhbinsky =

Russian and Ukrainian writer, editor, ethnographer and translator

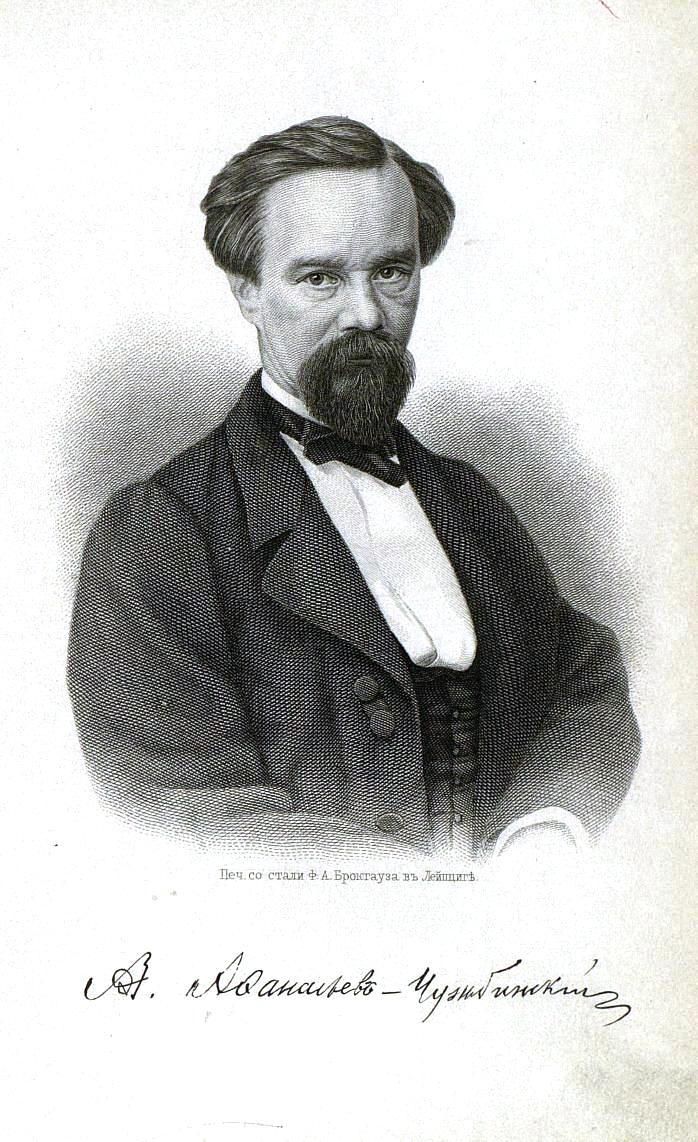
- Born: Александр Степанович Афанасьев; 12 March 1817; Poltava Governorate, Russian Empire
- Died: 18 September 1876 (aged 60); Saint Petersburg, Russian Empire
- Occupation: poet • writer • editor • ethnographer • translator

Alexander Stepanovich Afanasyev (Russian: Александр Степанович Афанасьев, 12 March 1817 – 18 September 1875) was a Russian and Ukrainian poet, writer, editor, ethnographer and translator (from Polish and English). In 1853 he started using the pseudonym Чужбинский (Chuzhbinsky) and has been known mostly as Afanasyev-Chuzhbinsky since.

Afanasyev was born in village Iskovtsy, Lubensky region, Poltava Governorate, Russian Empire, now Ukraine. He made his debut as a published poet in 1837 ("The Ring", Кольцо, Sovremennik); his first Ukrainian poem came out in 1841 (Saint Petersburg almanac Ластівка, Swallow). His Ukrainian poems were collected in From My Heart (Що було на серці) and published in 1855.

Afanasyev-Chuzhbinsky's two-volume ethnographic work, A Journey to the Southern Russia (Поездка в Южную Россию, Saint Petersburg, 1861) came as a result of his 1856 journey to Pridneprovye (Dnieper Ukraine) which he made as part of an ambitious Grand Duke Konstantin Nikolayevich-an inspired ethnographical campaign which involved several major Russian authors, including Alexander Ostrovsky and Alexey Pisemsky.

He took part in compiling the Dictionary of the Ukrainian Language (Словарь малорусского наречия, А – З; 1855) which was endorsed by the Russian Academy of Sciences, even if criticized by several Ukrainian language scholars.

Afanasyev launched Peterburgsky Listok (Petersburg Leaflet) in 1867, and later, in the 1870s Magazin Inostrannoi Literatury (Magazine of Foreign Literature) which he was also the editor. Afanasyev-Chuzhbinsky translated the works by James Fenimore Cooper, Henryk Rzewuski, Józef Ignacy Kraszewski and Józef Korzeniowski. In 1851 he compiled and published the Gallery of Polish Writers in 5 volumes.

He died in Saint Petersburg, aged 59.
