= Indradi Thanos =

Retired Indonesian police officer

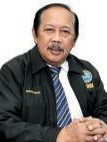

Riau Islands Police Chief
- In office 29 August 2008 – 27 January 2009
- Governor: Ismeth Abdullah
- Deputy: Syafrizal Ahiar
- Preceded by: Sutarman
- Succeeded by: Dikdik Arief Mansur

Personal details
- Born: 14 October 1953 (age 72) Jakarta, Indonesia

Military service
- Branch/service: Indonesian National Police
- Years of service: 1976–2013
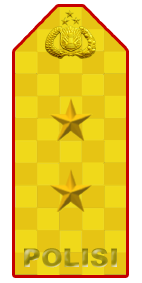
- Rank: Inspector General

Indradi Thanos (born 14 October 1953) is a retired Indonesian police officer who served as the Riau Islands Police Chief from 2008 until 2009.

== Early life ==
Thanos was born on 14 October 1953 in Jakarta, Indonesia.

== Police career ==
Thanos started his career in the police force after he entered the Police Section of the Armed Forces Academy. He graduated first from the academy in 1976 and received the Adhi Makayasa award — a distinction given to best performing graduates from the academy — on the day he was sworn in as a police lieutenant.

Thanos was deployed in various places in Indonesia after his graduation. Thanos was promoted to first lieutenant in the early 1980s and was put in command of the Investigation Task Force of the Central Jakarta Police. During his tenure in the task force, he arrested no less than 27 morphine users and distributors, and confiscated no less than 446 morphine packages and various other drugs. He was then moved to other posts and studied at the United Kingdom's Traffic Management Course. He finished the course in 1989 and returned to Indonesia shortly thereafter.

Two years later, Thanos was instructed to attend the Indonesian Police Staff and Leadership College by his superiors. He graduated from the college in 1992 and became one of the two best graduates. Due to his performance in the school, he was promoted from mayor to lieutenant colonel a year later and was appointed the police chief of South Surabaya until 1995. An innovation that was made during his service in South Surabaya was the introduction of the Integrated Security System Alarm (ASST, Alarm Sistem Sekuriti Terpadu). Although the system was relatively expensive at that time, Thanos claimed that it would allow police officers to detect security breaches in buildings as soon as possible by sending an alarm to the South Surabaya's police headquarters.

Several months later, Thanos was sent to overseas duty, leading a team of Indonesian police observers that was a part the Garuda Contingent and operated under the United Nations International Police Task Force. The team saw service in the United Nations Transitional Administration for Eastern Slavonia, Baranja and Western Sirmium, a UN administrative body that was set up during the aftermath of the Yugoslav Wars. The team ended their duty after they returned to Indonesia in March 1997.

In 2001, Thanos became the head of the psychoactive drug sub-directorate under the Indonesian central police's investigation team. During his final days in the sub-directorate in August 2003, Thanos led a team to arrest Marco Archer Moreira, a Brazilian drug trafficker, in Sumbawa. Although Thanos failed to arrest Moreira, he was eventually caught in Jakarta. Archer was executed twelve years later at the infamous Nusa Kambangan prison.

== Director for Drugs and Organized Crime ==
After holding various post outside the central police, Thanos returned to the central police investigation team, becoming the Deputy Director for Drugs and Organized Crime in July 2005. Less than a year later, Thanos was promoted to Director for Drugs and Organized Crime in December 2005.

=== Celebrity arrests ===
During his career as Director for Drugs and Organized Crime, Thanos made headlines due to his involvement in the arrests of high-profile Indonesian celebrities. His first major arrest was actor Roy Marten, who was caught red-handed using methamphetamine at a narcotics party. One of Marten's friends later admitted that the methamphetamine was supplied by inmates at the Cipinang Prison, which led to a sudden raid by police officers at the prison. Aside from Marten, another celebrity who was arrested by Thanos for narcotics abuse was actor Fachri Albar. Although Fachri managed to flee from the police following the discovery of a sack of cocaine in his bedroom, he turned himself in to the police four days later.

=== Missing methamphetamines ===
In November 2005, a joint team from the National Narcotics Board (BNN) police force, Directorate General of Customs and Excise, and the Directorate General of Immigration, uncovered a massive narcotics factory in Serang. About 13 kilograms of methamphetamines were confiscated from the factory and the Directorate for Drugs and Organized Crime was entrusted to safeguard the methamphetamines.

However, in April 2006, the methamphetamines suddenly disappeared, sparking controversy amongst the police force and BNN. Thanos stated that he was ready to be investigated regarding the disappearance of methamphetamines. Thanos then ordered a reconstruction of the incident, which revealed that the methamphetamines were misplaced at a warehouse owned by the Directorate for Drugs and Organized Crime.

=== Taman Anggrek raid ===
Thanos's largest arrest as a police officer was the Taman Anggrek raid, when he led a team of police to raid an apartment in Taman Anggrek. Several foreign drug dealers of Malaysian origin were arrested in the raid, while around half a million ecstasy pills were confiscated. After further investigation, another room in the apartment was raided and police found a ton of foreign currency along with several bottle of narcotic substances. Thanos then sent a sample of the ecstasy pills found in Taman Anggrek to the Australian Federal Police and the United States Drug Enforcement Administration for further examination. The Taman Anggrek raid propelled Thanos's career and he was appointed as the Riau Islands Police Chief in an official letter issued by the Chief of the Indonesian National Police on 22 August 2008.

== Riau Islands Police Chief ==
Thanos was officially installed as the Riau Islands Police Chief on 27 August 2008, replacing Sutarman. Following his appointment to the position, Thanos removed deputy chief Sulistyono from his office and replaced him with Syafrizal Ahiar.

Six months after his installation, on 21 January 2009, the Chief of the Indonesian National Police removed Thanos and appointed a new police chief for the Riau Islands. His removal sparked controversy due to his very short tenure and the fact that he did not hold any positions after his removal. Although an official from the police forces stated that his removal was part of a "regular tour of duty", a report by SCTV indicated that the removal was related to his leading role in the Taman Anggrek raid.

== National Narcotics Board and later life ==
After about a year with no position, Thanos was assigned to the post of Deputy for Legal and Cooperation Affairs in BNN on 26 October 2010. He was promoted to the post of coordinator in BNN in 2012. After about three years, he eventually retired in 2013.

During the 2014 Indonesian presidential election, Thanos endorsed presidential candidate Prabowo Subianto and joined his campaign team. Thanos also campaigned for Prabowo's party, the Great Indonesia Movement Party.

Thanos established the Golden Crown Disco Club in the late 2010s. The club's Tourism Business Registration Certificate was revoked on 7 February 2020 and the Jakarta provincial government forcefully closed it in May 2020. Thanos sued the Jakarta provincial government in the Jakarta District Court following the closure. The court ruled in favor of Thanos and instructed the provincial government to reopen the club.
