= Lydia Panas =

American photographer (born 1958)

- Born: 1958 (age 66–67); Philadelphia, Pennsylvania
- Known for: Photography
- Notable work: The Mark of Abel
- Website: lydiapanas.com

Lydia Panas (born 1958 in Philadelphia) is an American photographer.

== Biography ==
Panas holds degrees from Boston College, the School of Visual Arts, and New York University and received an independent study fellowship from the Whitney Museum.

She has photographed for The New York Times and exhibited in the US and abroad. Her book The Mark of Abel was named one of Photo District News Books of 2012 as well as best coffee table book by the Daily Beast. Penas published a second book, Falling From Grace, in 2016. She has been invited to teach classes and lecture in various colleges and venues, including the Museum of Modern Art, Lafayette, Muhlenberg, Cedar Crest, Moravian, and others.

Panas lives in Kutztown, Pennsylvania.

Her work is included in the collection of the Museum of Fine Arts Houston the Center for Photography at Woodstock, and the Brooklyn Museum of Art.

== Selected Exhibits ==
- 2014 – "Lydia Panas: After Sargent." Martin Art Gallery, Muhlenberg College, Allentown, PA
- 2017 – "Something Like Love." Eckhaus Gallery, Kutztown, PA
- 2019 – "Sleeping Beauty." Baker Center of the Arts, Muhlenberg College, Allentown, PA
- 2022 – "Sleeping Beauty." Bailey Contemporary Arts, Pompano Beach, FL
