= Athanasios Lefkaditis =

Founder of the Greek Boy Scouts (1872–1944)

- Αθανάσιος Λευκαδίτης
- Born: 1872; Athens
- Died: 18 June 1944 (aged 71–72); Athens
- Known for: Founder of Greek Scouting

Athanasios Lefkaditis Greek: Αθανάσιος Λευκαδίτης (1872 in Athens – June 18, 1944 in Athens) was the founder of Greek Scouting.

Lefkaditis was born in 1872 to parents from Argostoli on Cephalonia in the Ionian Islands in western Greece. In 1899 he received his professional physical education teaching license. His love for sports led him to become director of the Panhellenic Gymnastics Association and working with professor and school owner Dimitris Makris (Δημήτρης Μακρής).

During the 1908 Summer Olympics in London, as a member of the Greek delegation, Lefkaditis observed with interest the British Scouts' service and activities at the Games. He met with Robert Baden-Powell and shortly after, introduced Scouting in Greece in 1910.

In November 1910 he founded the first troop of Greek Scouts comprised by a number of his pupils at the Greek School of Dimitris Makris where he was a teacher. He was memorialized in 1963 on a postage stamp of Greece for the occasion of the 11th World Scout Jamboree, held 1–11 August 1963 in Marathon, Greece.

There are three books with his biography published so far, one by I. K. Dimitrakopoulos (1946) and two by Panayotis D. Cangelaris (1972 and 1994). Mention of him may be found in a number of other books related to Greek Scouting as well.
