= Anastasijević =

- Language: Serbo-Croatian

Origin
- Meaning: patronymic of Anastasije

Anastasijević (Serbian: Анастасијевић) is a Serbian surname, a patronymic derived from the given name Anastasije. It may refer to:

- Miša Anastasijević (1803–1885), the second richest man in Serbia in the 19th century, through his successful salt export from Wallachia and Moldavia and business partnership with the richest, Miloš Obrenović I, Prince of Serbia. He was also the Captain of Danube, and acquired significant benefits from Prince Miloš. He was the first public benefactor in Serbia and organizer of various balls for the Belgrade bourgeoisie.
- Dragutin Anastasijević (1877–1950), Serbian byzantinist and philologist, a member of Serbian Academy of Sciences and Arts.
- Sarka Anastasijević, wife of Prince George Karageorgevich, mother of Prince Bojidar Karageorgevitch
- Marijana Anastasijević, Serbian radio host
- Dimitrije Anastasijević Szabov, founder of Gymnasium of Karlovci in 1792

== See also ==
- Nastasijević
