= Athanase Auger =

French translator

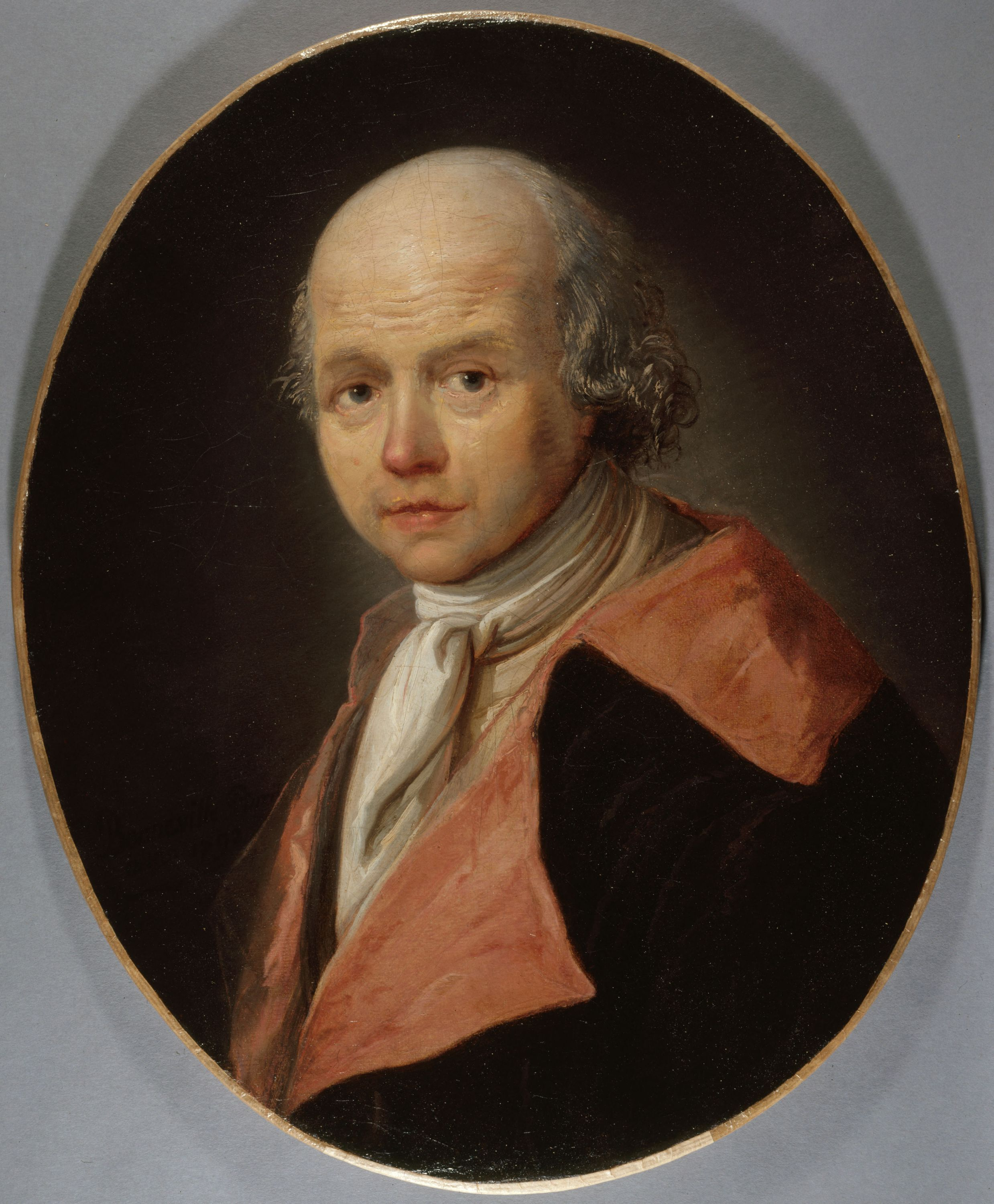
Portrait by François Bonneville, 1792

Athanase Auger, born 12 December 1734 in Paris, where he died on 7 February 1792, was a French educator, Hellenist and translator.

== Life and work ==
A priest of the diocese of Paris and master of arts, he was denied Agrégation by the University of Paris in 1766. He was professor of rhetoric at the royal college of Rouen from 1 July 1762 until 1776 and was grand vicar to the bishop of Lescar.

He took a position at Brécé on 16 February 1766, but resigned the next day to take another one at Ambrières. Alphonse-Victor Angot is unable to say if he ever actually performed any duties in this parish. In any case, he resigned from Ambrières on 20 May 1767, in favour of his colleague Jacques-Claude des Nos. He resumed his classes on rhetoric in Rouen, until 1776 when he left and established himself in Paris.

He translated the Greek orators and historians, including the complete works of Demosthenes, Aeschines, Isocrates and Lysias, as well as Andocides, Antiphon, Demades, Dinarchus, Herodotus, Isaeus, Lycurgus, Thucydides, and Xenophon. He also translated the Church Fathers Basil of Caesarea and John Chrysostom, as well as the Orations of Cicero and the Constitution des Romains sous les rois et au temps de la République (Constitution of the Romans under the Kings and in Republican times), a ten volume work which was published posthumously in 1792.

A moderate supporter of the French Revolution and admirer of Rousseau, Auger also wrote pieces on the political and educational reforms which he hoped would be carried out, principally instruction in civics and the education of women. At the time of the summoning of the États généraux, he wrote a monograph on education, titled Projet d’éducation générale pour le royaume (Project of General Education for the Kingdom).

Member of the Academy of Rouen, he also became a member of the Académie des Inscriptions et Belles-Lettres in 1781.

== Anecdote ==
In order to illustrate the customs of the province, Stendhal reproduced in his Mémoires d’un touriste a curious article, entitled Épisodes de la vie d’Anathase Auger publiés par sa nièce (Episodes in the Life of Anathase Auger, published by his niece), which describes a family reunion attended by the vicar and his bishop, the Comte de Noé. His niece writes "The comte de Noé was a magnificent man in size, figure and bearing. His noble and distinguished bustle, when he assumed his sacred garments, provoked the admiration of all who saw it; as for his grand vicar, he was small, meagre and very ugly." She further describes how the two prelates danced a round with the family and how Auger agreed, for an hour only and much against his will, to refer to his bishop as tu.

== Publications ==
- De la tragédie grecque (On Greek tragedy), Posthumous;
- Harangues d’Eschine et de Démosthène sur la Couronne (Harangues of Aeschines and of Demosthenes on the Crown), Rouen, Lallemant, 1768, in-12;
- De la Constitution des Romains sous les Rois et au temps de la République (On the Constitution of the Romans under the Kings and in Republican times), Paris, 1792, 3 vol., in-8;

Political and Educational Publications

- Discours sur l’Éducation, prononcés au Collège Royal de Rouen, suivis de Notes tirées des meilleurs Auteurs anciens et modernes; auxquels on a joint des Réflexions sur l’Amitié (Speech on Education, delivered at the Collège Royal de Rouen, with notes from the best ancient and modern authors; with some Reflections on Friendship) (Rouen, Leboucher, 1775);
- Réflexions sur le pouvoir exécutif )Reflections on Executive Power) (1785-1795);
- Moyens d’assurer la Révolution, d’en tirer le plus grand parti pour le bonheur et la prospérité de la France (Means of Assuring the Revolution draws the Largest Party for the Goodness and Prosperity of France) (1789);
- Projet d’éducation pour tout le royaume, précédé de quelques réflexions sur l’Assemblée nationale (Education Scheme for the whole Kingdom, preceded by some Reflections on the National Assembly), Paris, Didot, 1789, in-8°, 64 Online;
- Catéchisme du citoyen françois, composé de l’esprit et de la lettre de la nouvelle Constitution (Catechism of a French Citizen, composed in the Spirit and the Letter of the New Constitution) (1791);
- Sur les Gouvernemens en général, et en particulier sur celui qui nous convient (On Governments in General and in particular on which one suits us) (1791) Online.
- Plan d'organisation des écoles nationales (Plan of Organisation for National Schools), Paris, Imprimerie nationale, in-8°, 1791, VIII-44 Online;

== Bibliography ==
- Hérault de Séchelles, Éloge d’Athanase Auger lu à la séance publique de la Société des Neuf Sœurs, le 25 mars 1792 (1792). Republished in Hérault de Séchelles : Théorie de l’ambition et autres écrits, Éditions Ramsay, Paris, 1978.
- Louis Duval, Deux professeurs au collège de Rouen, curés d’Ambrières, 1900.

== Sources ==
« Athanase Auger », dans Alphonse-Victor Angot, Ferdinand Gaugain, Dictionnaire historique, topographique et biographique de la Mayenne, Goupil, 1900-1910, t. IV, p. 18.
