= Irina Afanasieva =

Russian theater producer

- Born: Irina Guseinovna Afanasieva; September 12, 1968 (age 57); Soviet Union
- Occupations: producer, librettist, director
- Years active: since 1998

Irina Guseinovna Afanasieva (born 12 September 1968) is a Russian theatre producer, librettist, director, and head of the Leningrad Youth Palace (LDM) Theatre ‘New Stage’.

== Career ==
From 1998 to 2012, she worked as the director general of the Russian-American company Hollywood Nights.

In September 2013, she established the producer centre ‘Makers Lab’. In 2014, she staged her first musical ‘The Master and Margarita’ at the St. Petersburg Music Hall. Later on, she annually participated in the productions of musicals: ‘Onegin’s Demon’ (2015), ‘Chudo-Yudo’ (2016), ‘Oscar and the Lady in Pink. Letters to God’ (2017), ‘Lolita’ (2018), ‘Seven Novellas’ (2019), ‘Diamond Chariot’ (2020), ‘The Curious Case of Benjamin Button’ (2021).

In February 2017, at the initiative of Afanasieva, the reconstruction of the Leningrad Youth Palace began where in October a new theatre was opened under the name of ‘Theatre LDM. New stage‘, which she headed.

== Theatrical works ==
Theatre LDM ‘New Stage’

- 2014 — ‘The Master and Margarita’ — producer, director, librettist
- 2015 — ‘Onegin’s Demon’ — producer, director, librettist
- 2016 — ‘Chudo-Yudo’— producer, director, librettist
- 2017 — ‘Oscar and the Lady in Pink. Letters to God’— producer, director, librettist
- 2018 — ‘Lolita’— producer, director, librettist
- 2019 — ‘Seven Novellas’ — producer, director, librettist
- 2020 — ‘Diamond Chariot’ — producer, director, librettist
- 2021 — ‘The Curious Case of Benjamin Button’ — producer, director, librettist
