= Valery V. Afanasyev =

Russian ice hockey coach (born 1976)

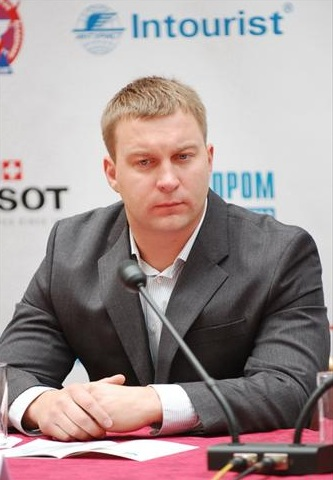
- Valery Vasilevich Afanasyev
- Born: September 3, 1976 (age 48); Leningrad, Russian SFSR, Soviet Union
- Occupation(s): Ice hockey coach, player
- Spouse: Yulia Afanasyeva
- Children: Kristian Afanasyev (elder son); Sebastian Afanasyev (younger son)

Valery V. Afanasyev (born September 3, 1976) is a Russian ice hockey coach. During 1994–1996 he participated in the Russian hockеy championship under H. C. Izhorets, Saint Petersburg (major league). He also participated in other hockеy league championships. He was a part of the 2005 Estonian hockеy championship winner team HC Stars of Tallinn (Professional league).

== Early life ==
He started playing hockеy at age 6. He started his career with the sports club Svetlana, Leningrad. His first coach was A. N. Galushkin.

He had successfully graduated from the University of Physical exercise and Sports, Saint Petersburg, under the specialty "Hockey coaching and hockey management". Apart from Russian, he is highly proficient in English and Spanish.

== Career ==
He worked as Head coach of the club Silver Lions from 1995 till 2013. He also worked as the head coach of Mexico-Select during 1996-2001.

He participated in several tournaments in Ottawa, Montreal and Lake Placid.

From 1996-2001 he participated in tournaments in Russia, Helsinki, Sherbrooke, Los Angeles and Ottawa. (Bantam, HC Mexico-Select). After 2000, he coached multiple teams, including Europe Select (2011-2014), Russian select team of North-West (2011-2013), Silver Lions 98 (2005-2013) and HC Gladiator (2012-)

He was the organizer and repeated winner of the traditional international tournament, with the best teams from Russia, USA, Canada, Finland, the Czech Republic and Belarus (2006-).

== Coaching statistics ==
As a coach, he led teams to many championships, including:

- HC Gomel (Belaru (2007 and 2008)
- Open Championship of the Czech Republic (2006)
- Christmas tournament in Los Angeles (2007)
- Cup of Lions (finalist) Stockholm, (2009)
- Christmas Star Saint Petersburg (2009)
- Russia region of the Northwest (2007 - 2013)
- Interregional competition for the prize of "Gazprom Neft" (Salekhard (2009)
- Golden Stick AAA President's Day, Chicago (2010)
- Rebellion Open (finalist) Karlskrona, Sweden (2010)
- Bauer Invite Europe (finalist) Stockholm (2010)
- Christmas tournament for teams born in 1997, Saint Petersburg (2010)
- V Christmas Star, Saint Petersburg (2010)
- International Pee-Wee Hockey (quarterfinals), Quebec (2011)
- World Selects Invitational Prague (2012)
- Cup of the North-West Saint Petersburg (2012)
- Folke Filbyter Cup (FFC) Linköping (2012)
- World Selects Invitational U-16 (Maine) (2014)

In Russian national hockey team U-17 players (Kirill Petskov, Georgiy Ivanov, Dmitriy Sokolov) trained by him are playing now. Players trained by him (Konstantin Chernyuk, Kirill Cherniavskiy, Yan Homenko, Kristian Afanasyev and Maxim Plekhov) participated and played on the Russian national hockey team last year.

== Gallery ==
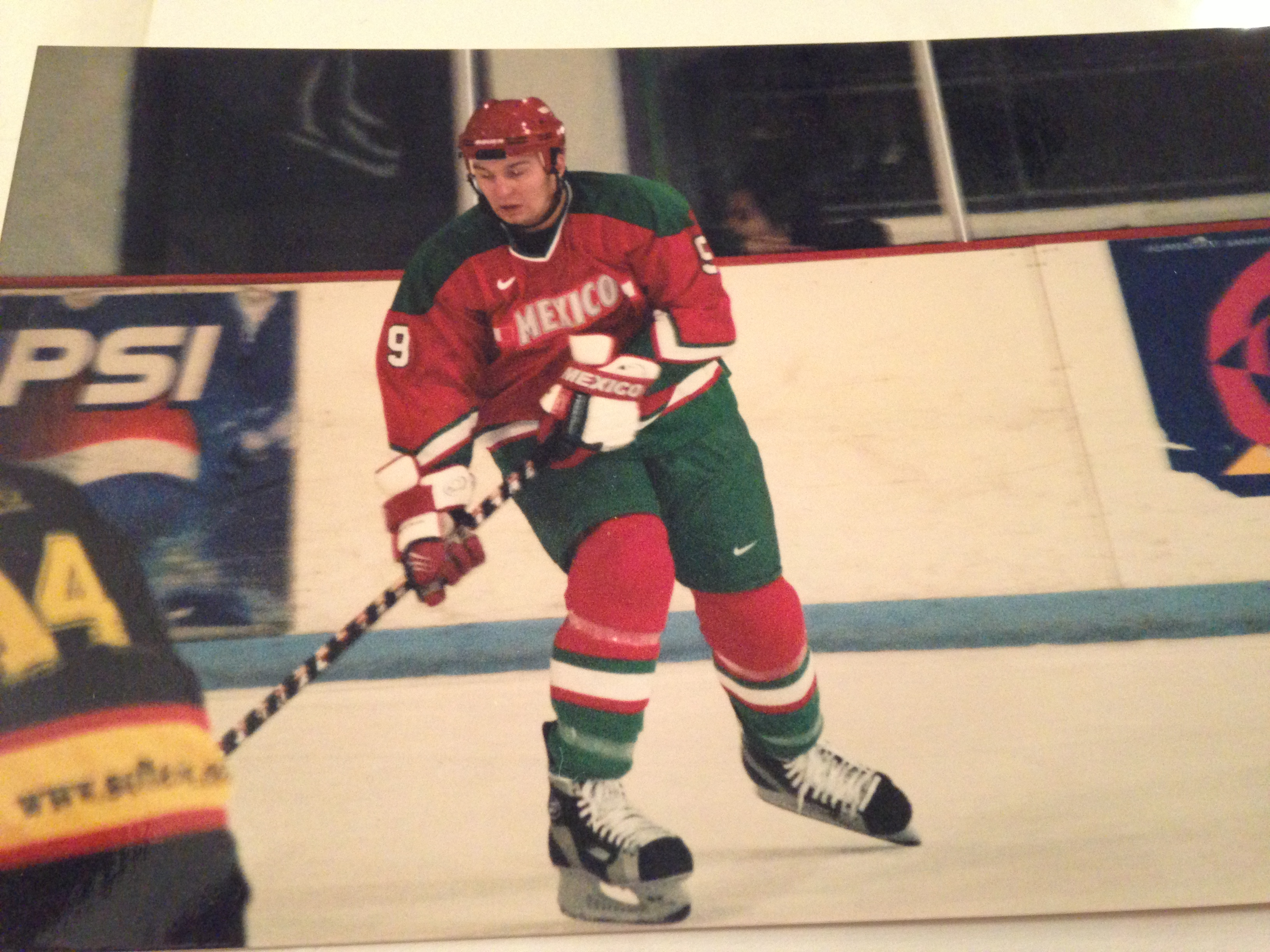

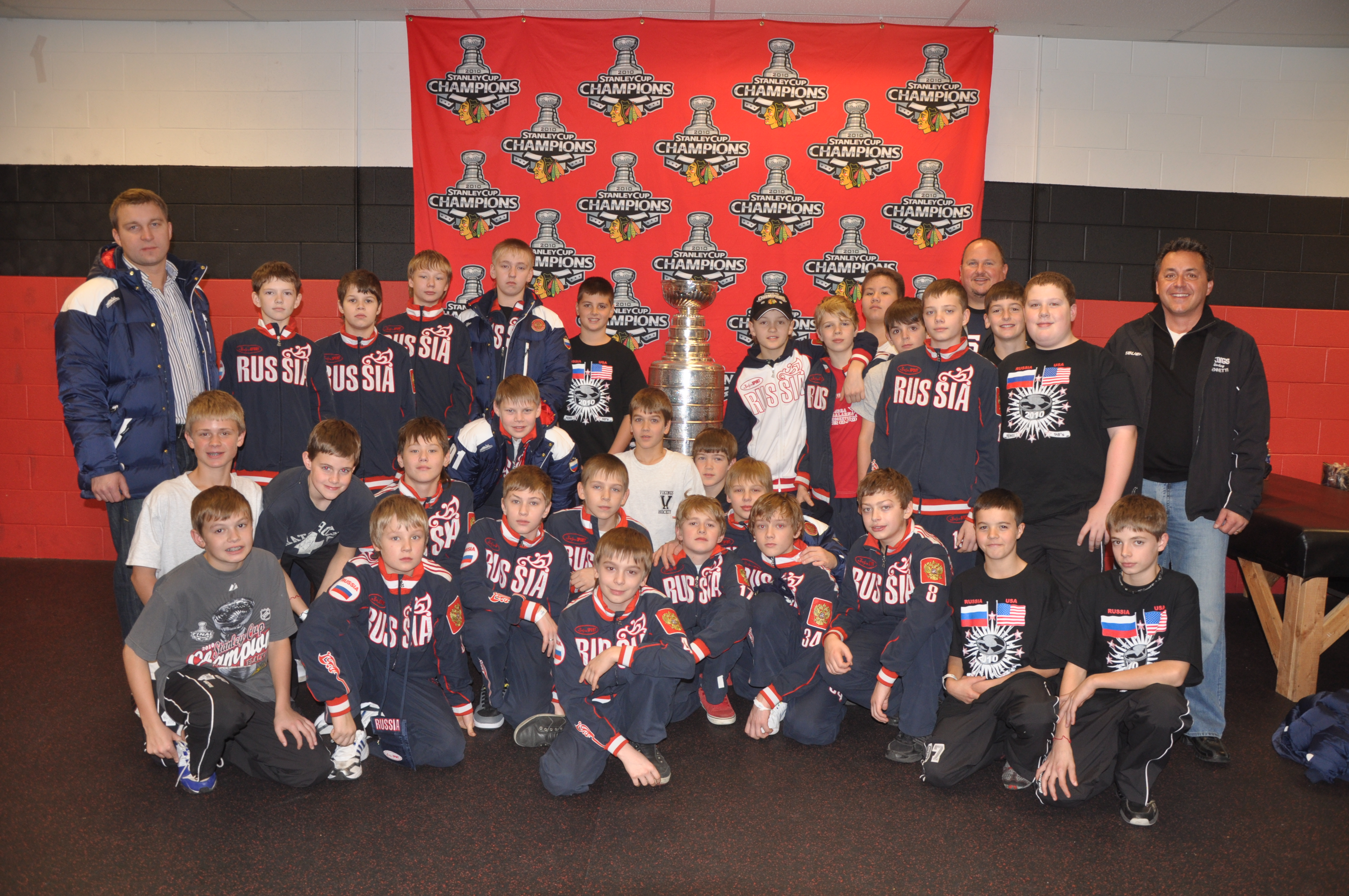

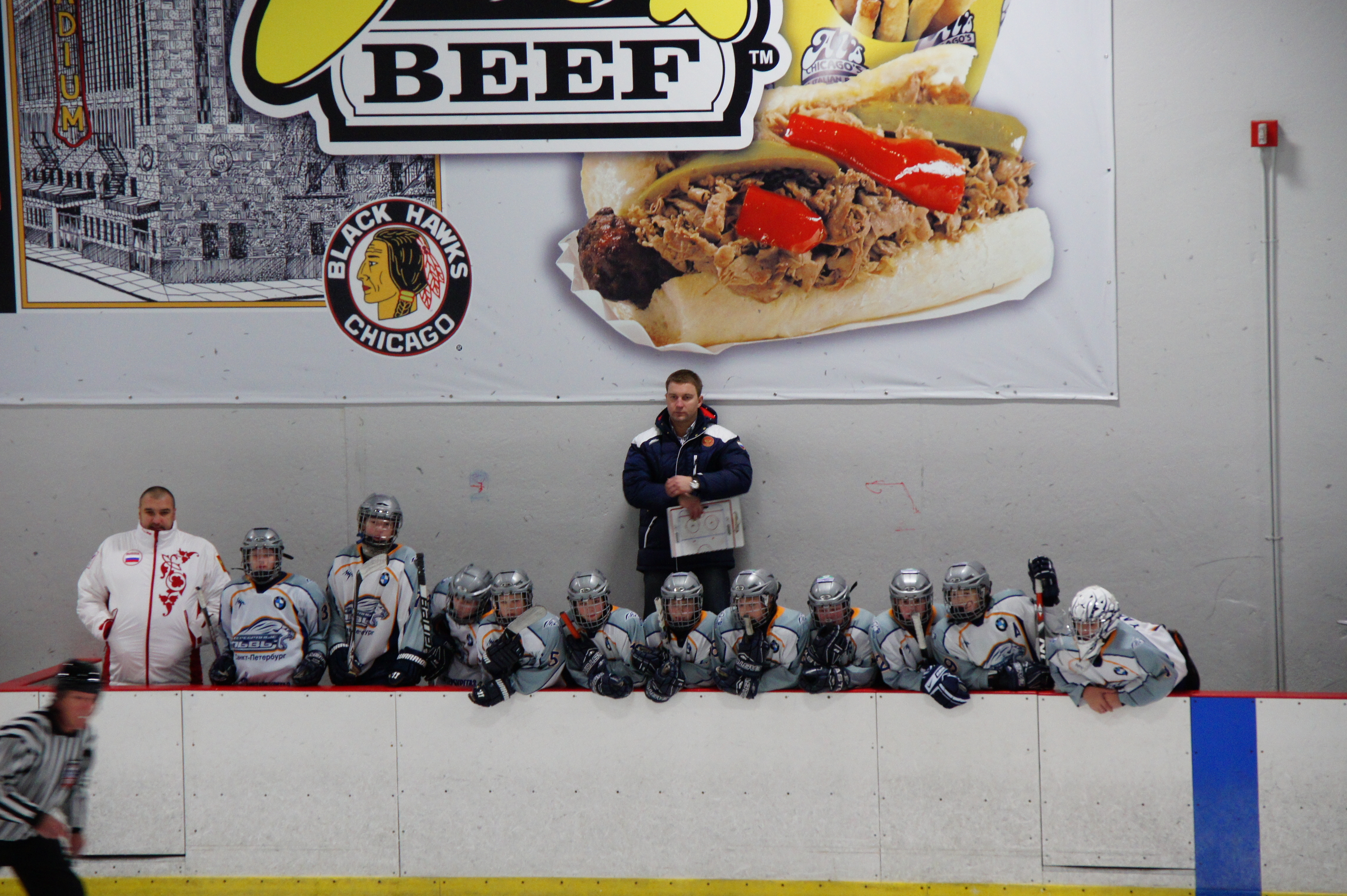

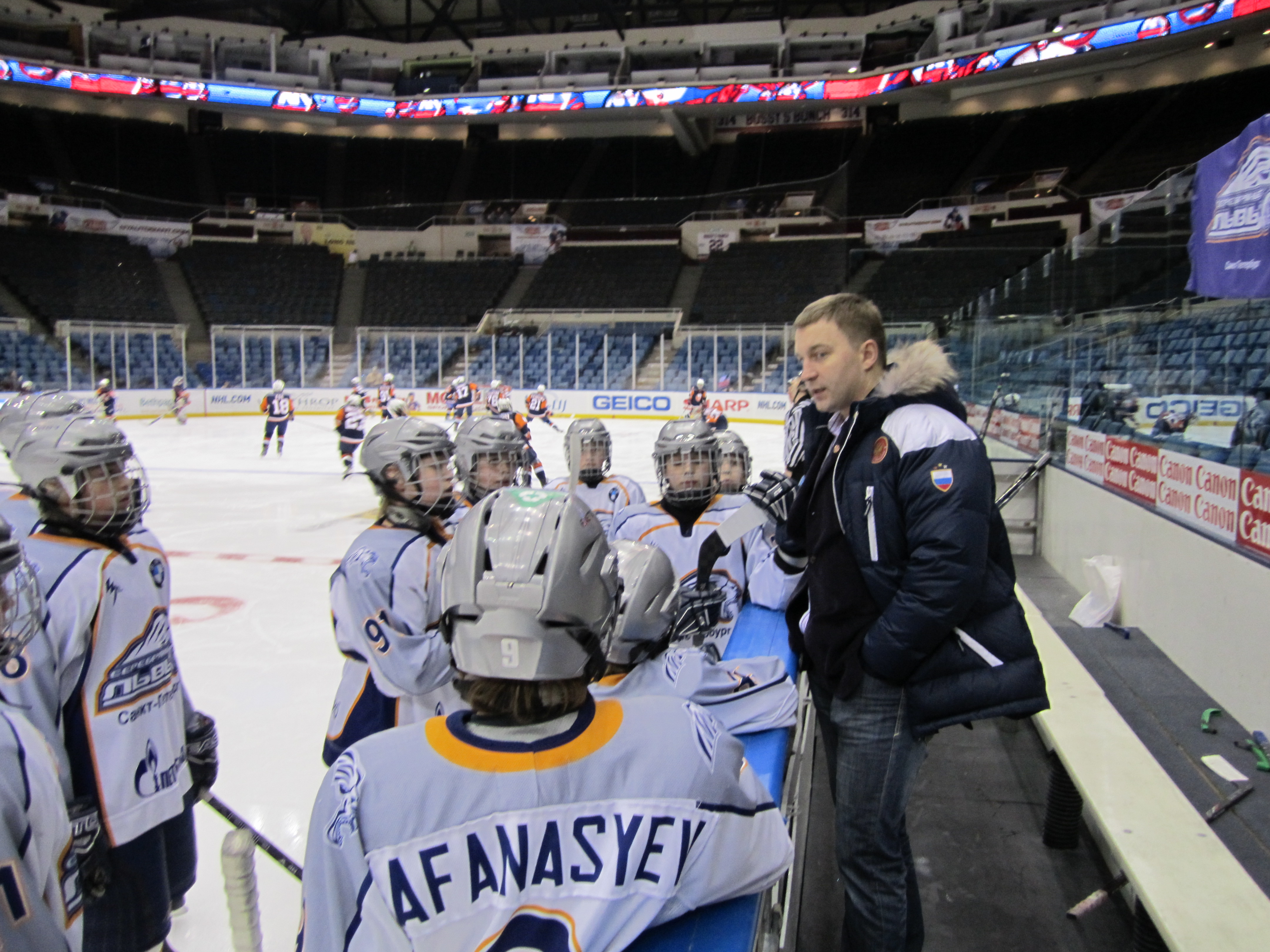

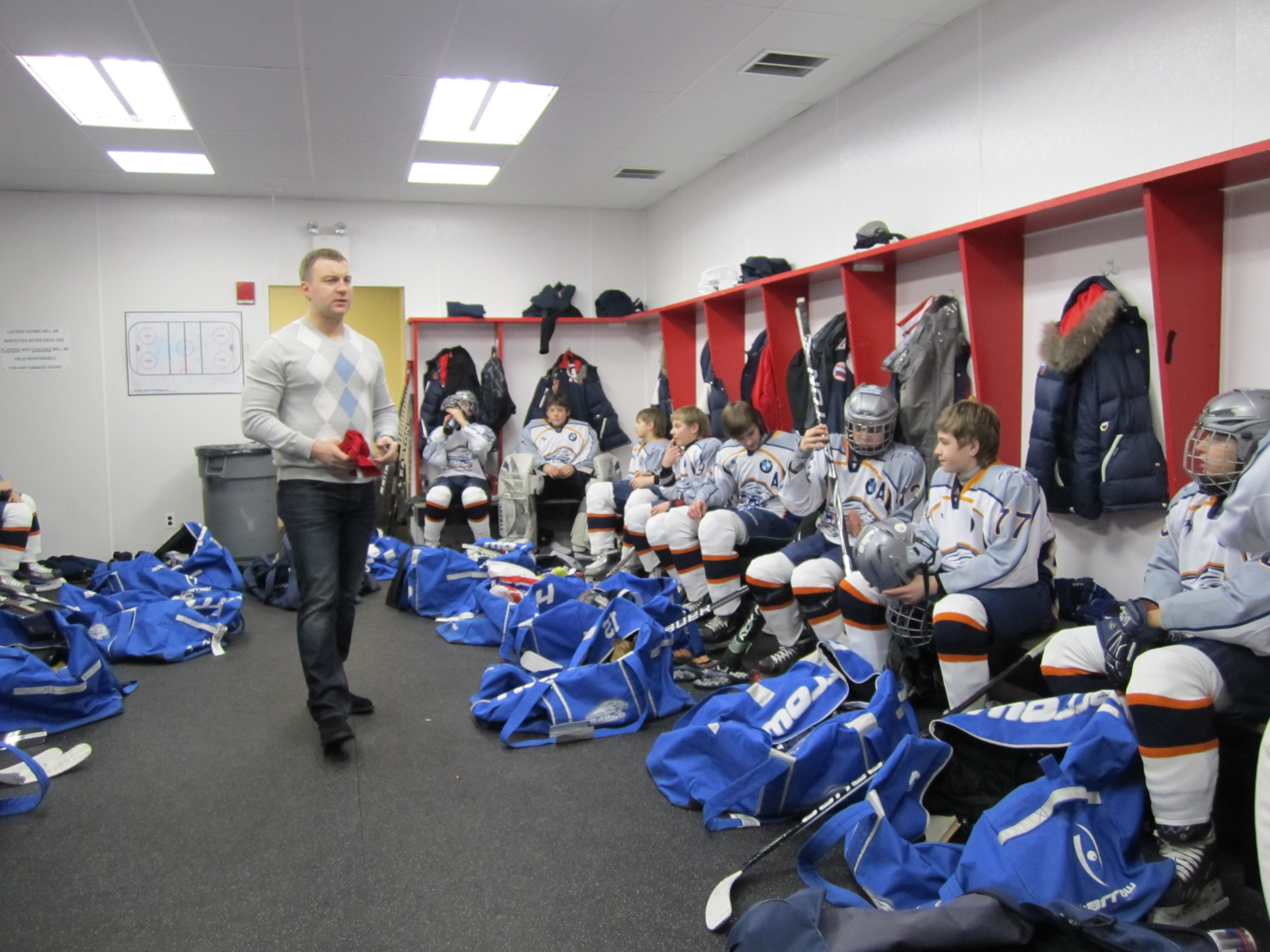
