= Demetrios A. Macrides =

- Δημήτριος Μακρίδης

Chief Commissioner of the Scouts of Greece

Demetrios A. Macrides (Greek: Δημήτριος Μακρίδης) served as the Chief Commissioner of the Scouts of Greece.

In 1967, Macrides was awarded the 45th Bronze Wolf, the only distinction of the World Organization of the Scout Movement, awarded by the World Scout Committee for exceptional services to world Scouting.
