= Lefas =

1984 Lefas motorcycle (370cc Lefas engine)

Lefas is the brand name of the motorcycles, engines and other systems created by the Greek engineer Thanassis Lefas.

== Life and career of Thanassis Lefas ==
Lefas was an engineer who devoted his career in improving the motorcycle design, but struggled to bring his designs to market. A motorcycle enthusiast from an early age, he worked for years making improvements in motorcycles for trials races. In 1982 he decided to incorporate all his improvement ideas into a completely new motorcycle. Introduced in 1984, the 370cc motorcycle featured a large number of novel features in suspension (being the first to feature an unconventional single rear wheel support and single shock absorber), brakes, frame and engine, all entirely designed and constructed by Lefas. This superb bike was intended for production; Lefas had already planned different versions and personally worked on the infrastructure for series manufacture of all its parts, including the engine.

However, he soon abandoned this project. Levels of state funding and support have been quoted as one reason, but this move was made mostly by choice, as Lefas focused entirely on a completely new design. Having "rejected" conventional front arrangement patterns (as eventually he did for the entire contemporary motorcycle design concept) as prone to instability especially during sudden turns, he developed the prototype of a completely new motorcycle between 1991 and 1994. Powered by a 900cc Ducati engine, the motorcycle incorporated a number of particularly unconventional features, including a rather complex front steering/suspension design. The prototype was tested in 1994 and exhibited superb riding performance and stability during turns; a patent application was subsequently made. Once more, though, the fate of the design was determined by Lefas's personal choices. A plan for production in Greece failed due to disagreements on financial matters with the Greek company interested in the project.

The death in 1995 of the famous motorcycle engineer John Britten, a good friend of Lefas who also proposed new ideas in motorcycle design, and the failure to convince companies abroad to incorporate his design, lead Lefas to temporarily withdraw from all original developments. He even rejected an invitation by Britten's family to move to New Zealand and continue Britten's work. In 2002, nonetheless, he resumed research work, developing a novel 4-stroke engine/frame unit while simultaneously working as a consultant in other engineering projects.

Interest in his 1994 prototype resumed in late 2003, when a Greek businessman with investments in Austria asked Lefas to develop a new frame (incorporating his front design) around a Triumph engine with the intent to produce the bike. Work on the new frame had started when Lefas became aware of serious health problems. In a move to "secure" a reliable prototype for future production (as he realized his deteriorating condition), he chose to perfect the 1994 motorcycle model before attempting to complete the new development. Thanassis Lefas died in December 2005 at the age of 53.
