= Tănase (river) =

- Location within Romania

Location
- Country: Romania
- Counties: Bistrița-Năsăud County
- Villages: Dorolea

Physical characteristics
- Mouth: Bistrița
  - coordinates: 47.1799°N 24.5903°E
- Length: 13 km (8.1 mi)
- Basin size: 43 km^{2} (17 sq mi)

Basin features
- Progression: Bistrița→ Șieu→ Someșul Mare→ Someș→ Tisza→ Danube→ Black Sea
- Tributaries
  - left: Cușma

The Tănase is a left tributary of the river Bistrița in Romania. It flows into the Bistrița near Livezile. Its length is 13 km (8.1 mi) and its basin size is 43 km^{2} (17 sq mi).
