= Nikolay Afanasyev (composer) =

Russian composer

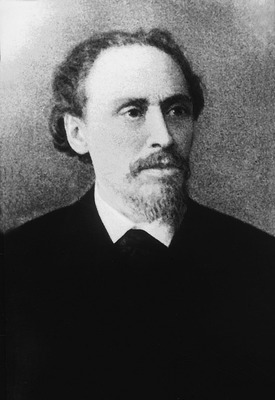
Nikolai Jakowlewitsch Afanassjew - Musiker.jpg

Nikolay Yakovlevich Afanasyev (Russian: Никола́й Я́ковлевич Афана́сьев; 12 January 1821 [O.S. 31 December 1820] – 3 June [O.S. 22 May] 1898) was an Imperial Russian violin virtuoso and composer. His memoirs 'Vospominaniya' ('Reminiscences') appeared in 1890, and recorded his experiences as a touring musician, as part of a panorama of Russian musical life during the mid 19th century. He became an honorary member of the Russian Musical Society in 1896.

== Biography ==
Afanasyev was born in Tobolsk in 1821. He obtained his musical education from his father, the violinist Yakov Ivanovich Afanasyev, an illegitimate son of Prince Ivan Dolgorukov. In 1838, two years after his debut as a violinist in Moscow, he was appointed concertmaster of the Bolshoi Theatre Orchestra. However, he resigned in 1841 to conduct the serf orchestra of a wealthy landowner at Vïksa, near Saint Petersburg. In 1846, Afanasyev left to embark on a concert tour of Russia, and eventually settled in Saint Petersburg in 1851, where he continued to perform as a soloist and as the concertmaster (sometimes conductor) of the Italian Opera. He quit orchestral work to begin teaching piano in 1853 at the Smolny Institute, before touring Western Europe with moderate success in 1857.

After returning to Russia, Afanasyev chose to commit himself to composition, and reached his finest in his small-scale works, which tended to suffer far less from the inconsistencies in technical skill that stemmed from his informal training. He won particular acclaim for works which were inspired by the melodies and rhythms of Russian folk music, an abiding interest of his which led to the publication of his popular anthology (1866) of folksongs arranged for four-part choir. Afanasyev's chamber music, most notably the string quartet Volga (c. 1860) which won a prize from the Russian Musical Society in 1861, also enjoyed similar acclaim.

In contrast, his operas had far less enthusiastic receptions. Although the Mariinsky Theatre staged Ammalat-bek in 1870, it has not been performed anywhere since; Sten'ka Razin failed to pass state censorship, while Vakula-kuznets was never performed. The manuscripts of several further operas and orchestral works remain unpublished.

He died in Saint Petersburg in 1898, aged 77.
