= Atanasije =

Atanasije (Serbian Cyrillic: Атанасије) is the Serbian variant of the Greek name Athanasios. Diminutives of the name include Atanas and Tanasko. It may refer to:

- Atanasije II Gavrilović (died 1752), Serbian Patriarch (1747–1752)
- Athanasius I of Ohrid (fl. 1596–1615), Archbishop of Ohrid (1596–1598)
- Atanasije (scribe) (1200–1265), Serbian monk-scribe
- Tanasko Rajić (1754–1815), Serbian Revolutionary
- Atanasije Stojković (1773–1832), Serbian writer and educator
- Atanasije Jevtić (1938–2021), Serbian Orthodox bishop and theologian
- Atanasije Nikolić (1803–1882), first rector of the Belgrade Lyceum
- Atanasije Antonijević, Serbian archpriest

== See also ==
- Atanasijević, patronymic
