= Athanase Laurent Charles Coquerel =

French theologian (1795–1868)

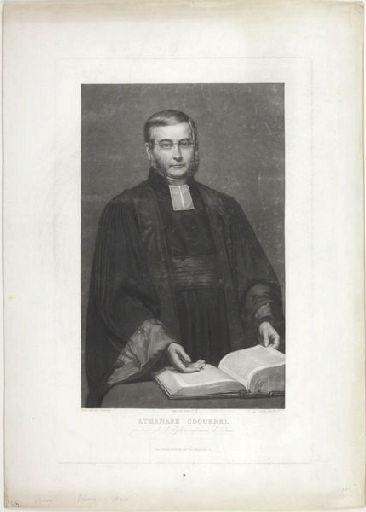
Athanase Laurent Charles Coquerel

Athanase Laurent Charles Coquerel (7 August 1795 – 1868) was a French Protestant theologian, born in Paris, elected deputy of the Constituent Assembly after the revolution of February 1848.

== Life ==
He received his early education from his aunt, Helen Maria Williams, an Englishwoman, who at the close of the 18th century gained a reputation by various translations and by her Letters from France. He completed his theological studies at the Protestant seminary of Montauban, and in 1816 was ordained minister. In 1817 he was invited to become pastor of the chapel of St Paul at Jersey, but he declined, being unwilling to subscribe to the Thirty-nine Articles of the Church of England. During the following twelve years he resided in the Netherlands, and preached before Calvinistic congregations at Amsterdam, Leiden, and Utrecht. In 1830, at the suggestion of Baron Georges Cuvier, then minister of Protestant worship, Coquerel was called to Paris as a pastor of l'Oratoire du Louvre. He succeeded Paul-Henri Marron as principal pastor after Marron's death in 1832. During the course of 1833 he was chosen a member of the consistory, and rapidly acquired the reputation of a great pulpit orator, but his liberal views brought him into antagonism with the rigid Calvinists. He took a warm interest in all matters of education, and distinguished himself so much by his defence of the University of Paris against a sharp attack, that in 1835 he was chosen a member of the consistory of the Legion of Honor. In 1841 appeared his Response to the Leben Jesu of Strauss.

After the revolution of February 1848, Coquerel was elected a member of the National Assembly, where he sat as a moderate republican, subsequently becoming a member of the Legislative Assembly following the May 1849 election, won by the conservative Parti de l'Ordre. He sieged as a member of the legislative commission which prepared the draft for the Falloux Laws on education.

He supported the first ministry of Louis Napoleon, and gave his vote in favor of the expedition to Rome and the restoration of the temporal power of the pope. After the coup d'état of 2 December 1851, he confined himself to the duties of his pastorate. He was a prolific writer, as well as a popular and eloquent speaker. He died at Paris on 10 January 1868. A large collection of his sermons was published in 8 vols. between 1819 and 1852. Other works were Biographie sacrée (1825–1826); Histoire sainte et analyse de la Bible (1839); Orthodoxie moderne (1842); Christologie (1858), &c.

He married (Amsterdam, 7 September 1819) Anne "Nancy" Rattier (8 November 1792 - 24 January 1826) with whom he had 5 children: Athanase (16 June 1820 - 24 July 1875), Charles (2 December 1822 - 12 April 1867,) Helene Rosalie Cecile (30 September 1821 - 20 January 1826), Jean Persis (23 June 1824) and Cécile (20 July 1825 - 2 July 1885). In his second marriage (Amsterdam, 25 October 1827) he married Sophie Mollet (1802 - 1891) and had 3 children: Etienne Jean (9 November 1829 - 15 June 1901), Henri (8 September 1828 - 28 June 1841) and Paul Augustin (20 November 1831 - 1909)

His brother, Charles Augustin Coquerel (1797–1851), was the author of a work on English literature (1828), an Essai sur l'histoire genérale du christianisme (1828) and a Histoire des églises du desert, depuis la revocation de l'edit de Nantes (1841). A liberal in his views, he was the founder and editor of the Annales protestantes, Le Lien, and the Revue protestante.
