= Athanase Josué Coquerel =

French theologian & author

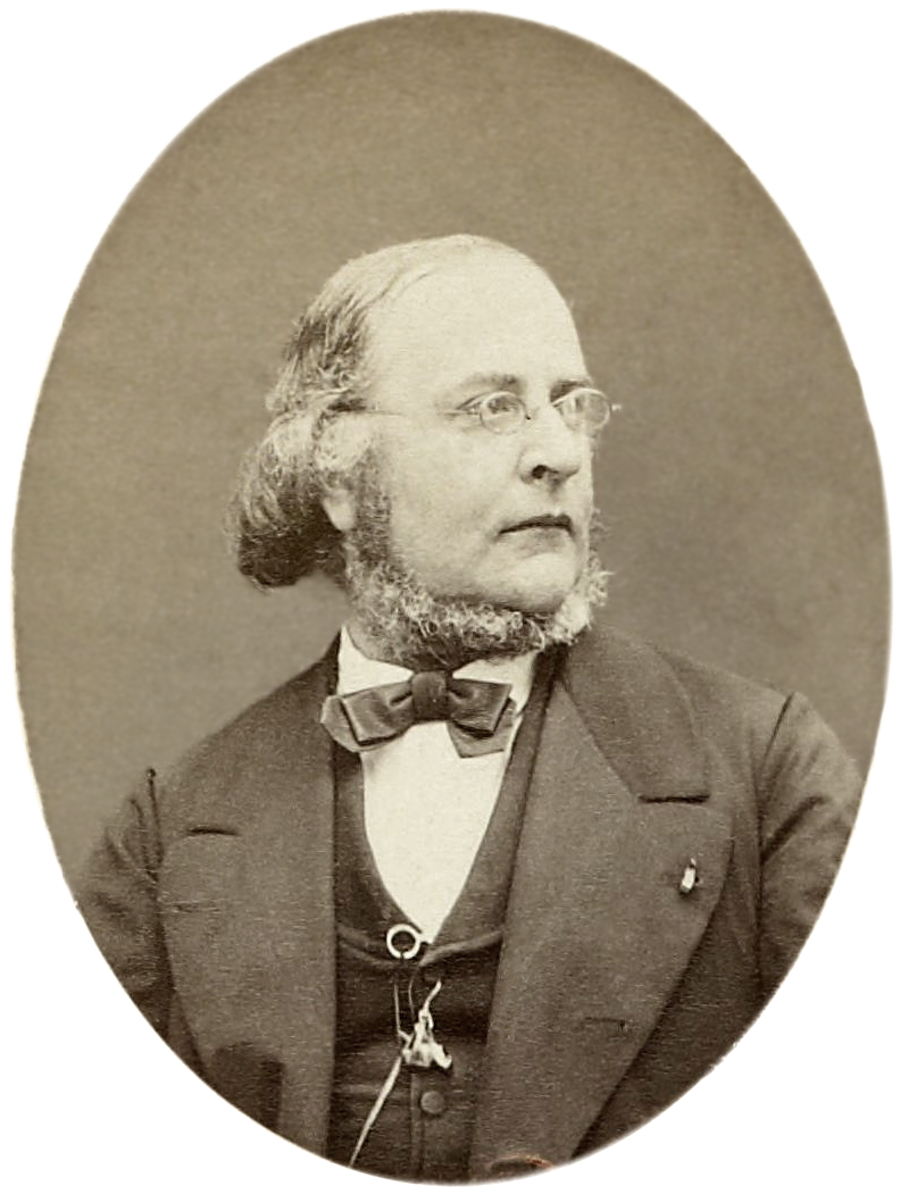
Athanase Josué Coquerel

Athanase Josué Coquerel (16 June 1820 – 24 July 1875) was a French Protestant theologian.

== Life ==
The son of Athanase Laurent Charles Coquerel, he was born in Amsterdam and studied theology at Geneva and at Strasbourg, and at an early age succeeded his uncle, C. A. Coquerel, as editor of Le Lien, a post which he held till 1870. In 1852 he took part in establishing the Nouvelle Revue de théologie, the first periodical of scientific theology published in France, and in the same year helped to found the Société de l'histoire du protestantisme français (Historical Society of French Protestantism).

Meanwhile, Coquerel had gained a reputation as a preacher, and especially as the advocate of religious freedom; but his teaching offended to the orthodox party, and on the appearance (1864) of his article on Renan's Vie de Jésus in the Nouvelle Revue de théologie he was forbidden by the Paris consistory to continue his ministerial functions. He received an address of sympathy from the consistory of Anduze, and a provision was voted for him by the Union Protestante Libérale, to enable him to continue his preaching. He received the cross of the Légion d'honneur in 1862. Coquerel died in Fismes (Marne).

== Works ==
Coquerel's major works were Jean Calas et sa famille (1858); Des Beaux-Arts en Italie (Eng. trans. 1859 by Emily and Edward Higginson); La Saint-Barthélémy (1860); Précis de l'Eglise réformée (1862); Le Catholicisme et le protestantisme considérés dans leur origine et leur développement (1864); Libres études, and La Conscience et la foi (1867).
