= Agriculture in Saskatchewan =

Agriculture of the Province Saskatchewan in Canada

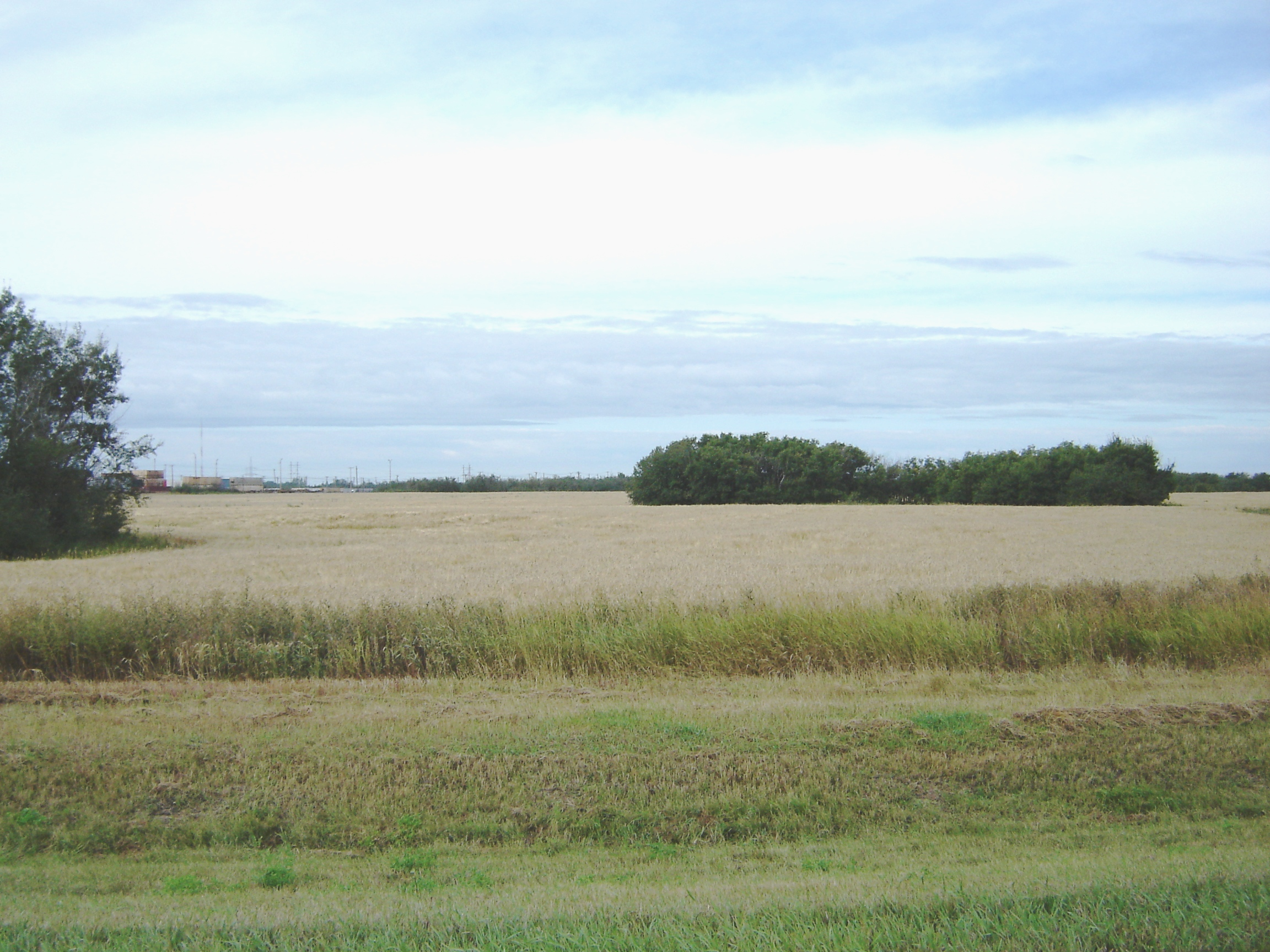
Grain field in the aspen parkland near Saskatoon

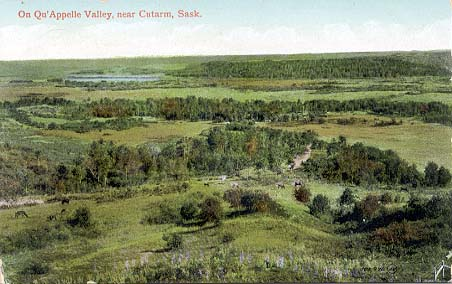
Qu'Appelle Valley near Cutarm, Sask., circa 1910

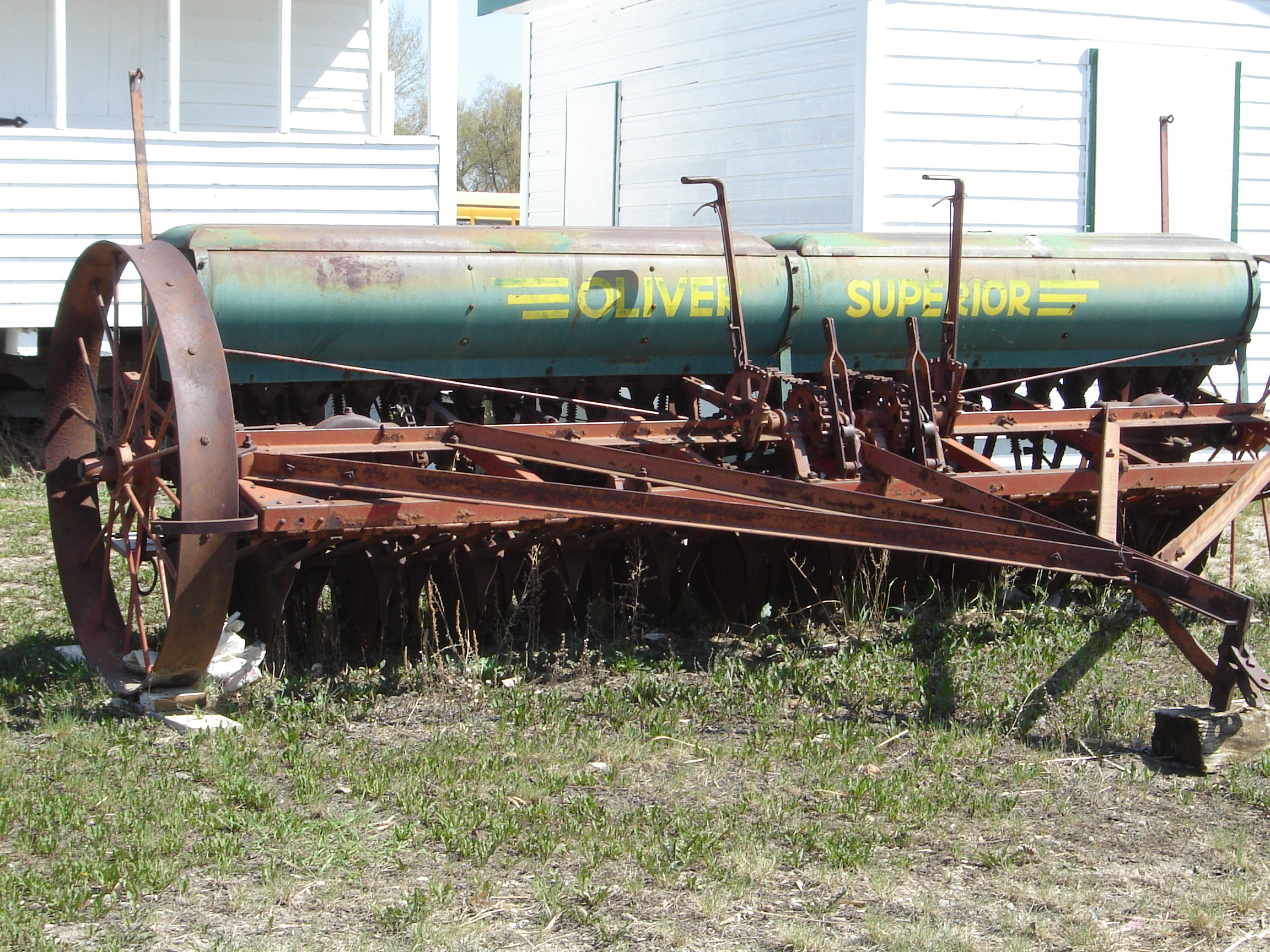
Horse-drawn grain and fertilizer drill

Agriculture in Saskatchewan is the production of various food, feed, or fiber commodities to fulfill domestic and international human and animal sustenance needs. The newest agricultural economy to be developed in renewable biofuel production or agricultural biomass which is marketed as ethanol or biodiesel. Plant cultivation and livestock production have abandoned subsistence agricultural practices in favor of intensive technological farming resulting in cash crops which contribute to the economy of Saskatchewan. The particular commodity produced is dependent upon its particular biogeography or ecozone of Geography of Saskatchewan. Agricultural techniques and activities have evolved over the years. The first nation nomadic hunter-gatherer lifestyle and the early immigrant ox and plow farmer proving up on his quarter section of land in no way resemble the present farmer operating huge amounts of land or livestock with their attendant technological mechanization. Challenges to the future of Saskatchewan agriculture include developing sustainable water management strategies for a cyclical drought prone climate in south western Saskatchewan, updating dryland farming techniques, stabilizing organic definitions or protocols and the decision to grow, or not to grow genetically modified foods. Domestically and internationally, some commodities have faced increased scrutiny from disease and the ensuing marketing issues.

Canada's production of wheat, oats, flaxseed, and barley come mainly from Saskatchewan and the prairie provinces. Meat processing is the largest industry here, followed by dairy production, breweries, and the subsidiary industry of agricultural implements. Saskatchewan still has cattle ranching along the southwestern corner of the province, However, grain farming and growing crops such as wheat, oats, flax, alfalfa, and rapeseed (especially canola) dominate the parkland area. Mixed grain farming, dairy farms, mixed livestock and grazing lands dot the central lowlands region of this prairie province.

== History of agriculture in Saskatchewan ==
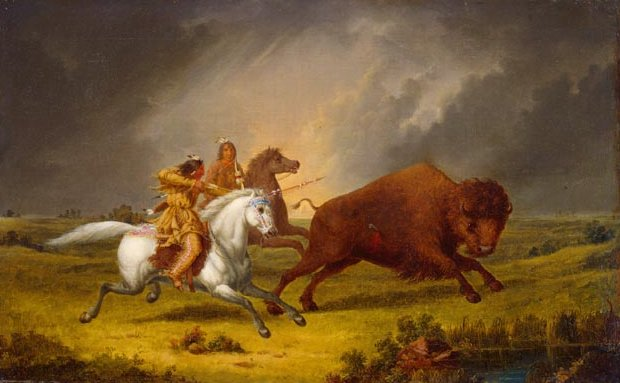
Buffalo Jump

First Nations inhabitants of Saskatchewan were the first to process plants and animals to produce food. Agriculture in Saskatchewan began with First Nations tribal practices where the men would follow livestock movements, a form of transhumance and women and children would remain at home carrying out a hunting and gathering lifestyle. There was the hunter-gather lifestyle of the mainland which combined the use of buffalo jump hunting methods, fishing, berry, and herb gathering. Indigenous agricultural mainstays varied depending on the geographical area. The animal hunted also varied depending on geographical area.

With the arrival of the European fur trader, inland first nations developed animal trapping and many Woodland Cree relied on their skills as the area fur trapper. Along the U.S.A. Canada border or medicine line, the land was more suitable for cattle grazing. As the buffalo population decreased, ranching ventures increased; as well the practice of extensive farming began. But the history of farming for First Nations was a very different story than those of the colonizers. Rural sociology developed with a Saskatchewan identity, and geography.

The advent of Canada's confederation, presented the nation with the task of building a transcontinental railway. Railways were hesitant to build across the prairies, so an intensive immigration policy was implemented to encourage agricultural settlement. Agricultural science began developing many new styles of farming and strains of wheat and crops so that homesteading could become a successful venture. Upon arrival of immigrants to Saskatchewan at the end of the 19th century and beginning of 20th century, plant cultivation combined with pastoralism or ranching began. One major difference in the perspective of agriculture between the 19th and 20th century is that the hunter gatherer lifestyle was more of a subsistence lifestyle, and early homesteaders grew mainly subsistence crops which would feed their own family and livestock. Farming methods were developed at places such as Indian Head Experimental Farm, Rosthern Experimental Station, and Bell Farm. The Better Farming Train traveled around rural areas educating pioneer farmers. With population growth, advances in agricultural science, permanent settled lifestyle farmers started growing cash crops which would provide money giving an economic base for the family. The Dominion Land Act of 1872 offered pioneers an opportunity to prove up a quarter section of land (one hundred and sixty acres, a quarter square mile, 64 hectares). in Western Canada for a $10.00 filing fee. The Industrial Revolution modernized the farming industry as mechanized vehicles replaced the oxen ploughed land or the horse-drawn cart. Farms became much larger, and mechanized evolving towards industrial agriculture. See also History of Agriculture.

== Farm equipment ==
The Oliver plow was in use by 1896 which could cut through the prairie sod. Binders which could cut and tie grain for the harvest season and grain elevators for storage were introduced in the late 19th century as well. Plows, tractors, spreaders, combines to name a few are some mechanized implements for the grain crop or horticultural farmer which are labor saving devices. Many Canadian museums such as Saskatchewan Western Development Museum will showcase the evolution and variety of farm machinery.

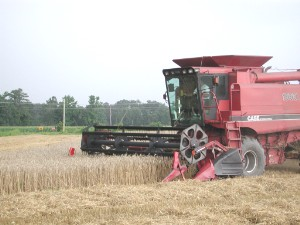
Harvest of Wheat via combine

== Cereal Crops ==
=== Wild Rice ===
Saskatchewan produces the most Wild Rice in Canada. Wild rice can be found growing in the wild here. In 1998 there were around 200 producers "and over half of those have treaty status and produce from First Nations-designated land. Between 75-80% of all Saskatchewan producers are of Aboriginal ancestry." Watch small Sask. producers harvest some of the world's finest wild rice.

=== Wheat ===
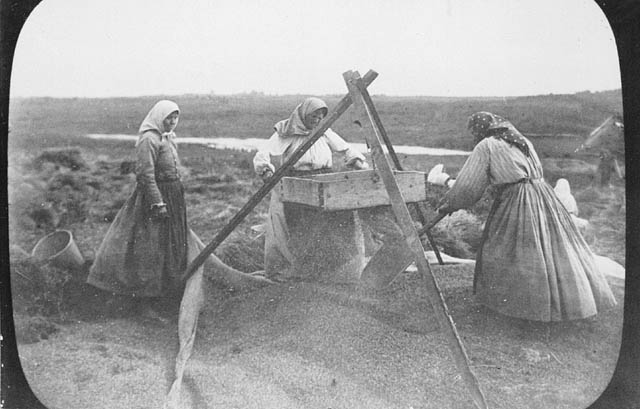
Doukhobor women winnowing grain, Saskatchewan, 1899

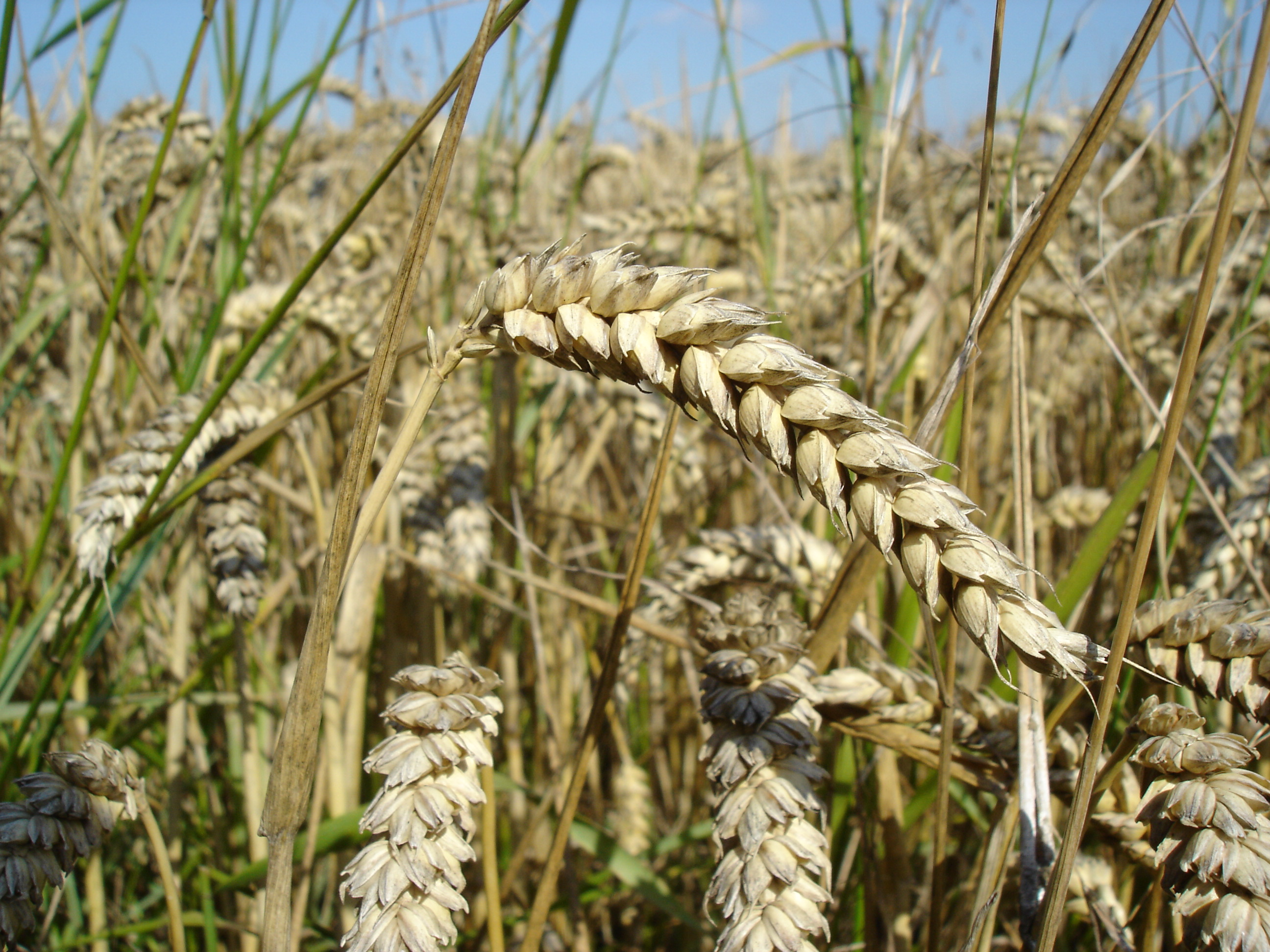
Wheat head close up view

In 1925, Saskatchewan produced over half of the wheat in the Dominion of Canada threshing in excess of 240,000,000 bushels (6,500,000 t) of wheat. North America has many times led other international continents as the main producer of wheat in total world production. Rapeseed, alfalfa, barley, canola, flax, rye, and oats are other popularly grown grain crops.

Wheat is a staple crop from Canada. To help homesteaders attain an abundance harvest in a foreshortened growing season, varieties of wheat were developed at the beginning of the twentieth century. Red Fife wheat was the first strain; it was a wheat which could be seeded in the fall and sprout in the early spring. Red Fife ripened a week and half sooner and was a hardier wheat than other spring wheat. Dr. Charles E. Saunders, experimented further with Red Fife, and developed Marquis Wheat, resistant to rust, and came to maturity within 100 days. Some other types of wheat grown are durum, spelt, and winter wheat.

The Orange Wheat Blossom Midge (Sitodiplosis mosellana) is a major drag on wheat productivity in North America, and nowhere moreso than in the west of Canada, especially here and in Manitoba. In the particular conditions of this province, even population densities of one larva per kernel is enough to reduce yield and cause quality problems. Although originally from Europe, and upon first introduction to NA primarily a pest of the coasts, for reasons unknown S. mosellana largely disappeared from the east coast around 1925 and became more severe in this province and areas nearby. Even more severe epidemics began in 1983 on the border with Manitoba, near the northernmost point of profitable wheat farming. 1983 was a year of unusually high summer rain and this is believed to be the reason.

=== Barley ===
Barley is a major crop of Saskatchewan supplying the malt industry with their primary ingredient.

=== Oats ===
Oats show Agricultural productivity in Saskatchewan for livestock feed as well as for the cereal industry.

=== Rye ===
Saskatchewan produces the most rye in Canada, but the number of rye producers in the province are small compared to other agricultural concerns. Rye can be a spring and fall crop, because of its fast growing nature.

=== Triticale ===
Triticale is a manmade crop for growing in tolerate drought prone areas. It was produced by breeding together both wheat and rye and is used for animal feed.

== Pulse Crops ==
With intervention of man made irrigation, the soil is suitable for harvesting beans, chickpeas, lentils and peas. For instance near Lake Diefenbaker dry beans are produced. There are two types of chickpeas grown in Saskatchewan, both kabuli and desi. They prefer the brown soil region, and the dark brown soil regions respectively. Another type of pulse crop is lentil. Both red and green lentils are grown in Saskatchewan. Saskatchewan is the world's largest exporter of lentils, exporting 67% per cent of the world lentils. Finally several pea varieties are harvested in Saskatchewan. Pulse crops provide diversification in crop production, provide farm revenue to farmers, and lengthen crop rotation.

== Oilseeds ==
Canola, flax, sunflower, and yellow, brown, and oriental mustard . Since the 1970s research has developed oilseed crops and the industry has flourished in the province. Sunflower plants are harvested for the sunflower seed, sunflower oil and birdseed industries.

== Horticulture ==
Horticulture which includes garden crops, and fruits became easier to grow with the development of plant hardiness zones. In Saskatchewan, the main horticultural products would be potatoes (for seed and commercial sale), small fruits, vegetables, fresh and dried flowers greenhouse production, sod operations, and nursery operations.

== Livestock ==
In Saskatchewan, the main livestock industries would be (in this order) beef, pork, bison, sheep and goats. Some newer industries have experimented with the agricultural productivity of llama, alpaca, ostrich, rhea, emu, wild boar, deer, and elk. 115,000 cattle roamed the southern prairies by 1900. Livestock can include the raising of cattle. Recently domestication of the buffalo and elk has initiated a new food industry. Sheep have been raised for both wool and meat. Bovine or pig barns have been a part of livestock culture. Scientists have been making forward steps in swine research giving rise to intensive pig farming. The domestication of various farm animals meant that corresponding industries such as feedlots, animal husbandry and meat processing have also been studied, and developed.

== Poultry and eggs ==
Fowl, poultry, eggs, chickens, geese, ducks and turkeys are part of a supply-managed system, ensuring production matches demand.

== Dairy ==
Dairy producing is also termed dairy farming. This includes the production of cheeses, milk, yogurts, sour cream, buttermilk, butter and other milk products.

== Fisheries ==
The fishery industry is an income source on inland lands and rivers. Near Gravelbourg is a shrimp processing plant on Canada's second largest saline lake.

== Organic farming ==
In recent years more and more farmers are producing alternative crops and ways of being economically viable, and are turning to organic farming. Therefore, research focuses on pesticide free production, insect management, fertility, weed management, disease management, and soil conservation.

== Other ==
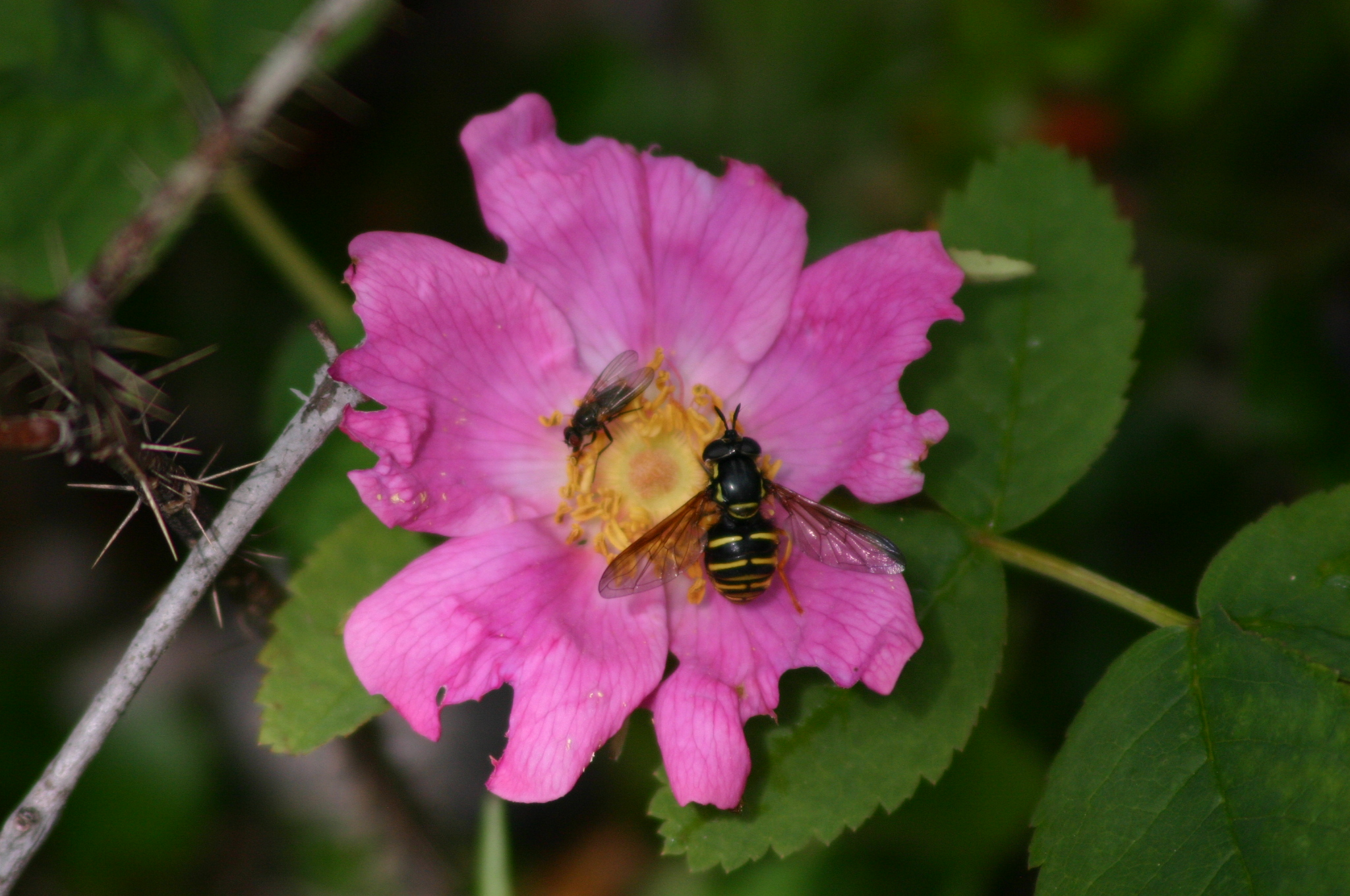
Honeybee

Many crop growers will supplement their incomes with beeswax and honey and learn beekeeping. New markets are being looked into such as canary seed. Very few farmers engage in cuniculture, or rabbit farming to any significant extent, although they are a new grocery alternative to the red meat burger.

== Production ==
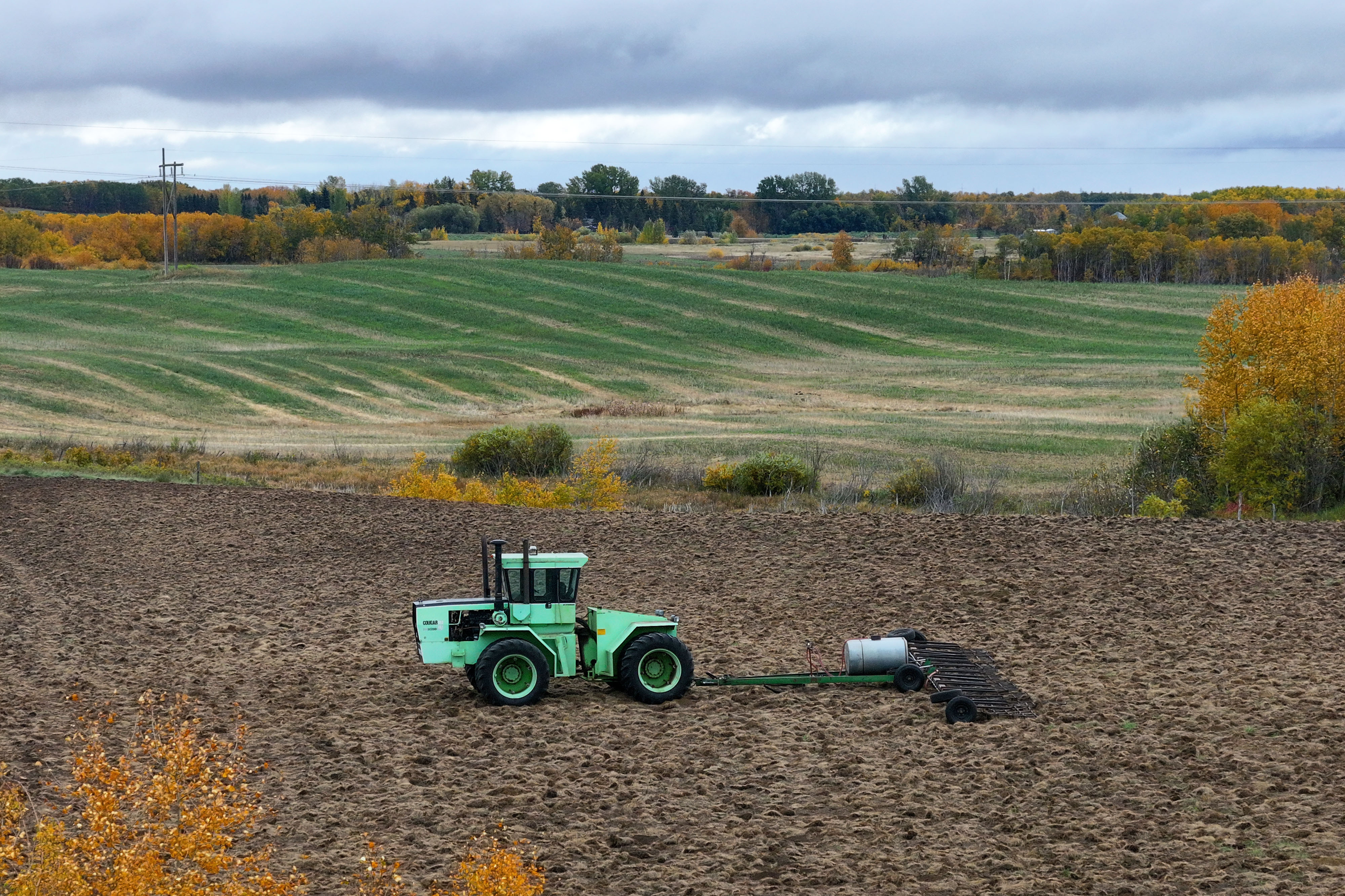
Tilled field near Prince Albert, SK

Farming activities were very labor-intensive before the industrial revolution and the advent of tractors, combines, balers, etc. In the late 19th century to mid-20th century, a great percentage of the Saskatchewan labor force was engaged in high labor, smaller farming practices. After mechanization, scientific advancement, improved marketing practices so farms became more efficient, larger and less labor-intensive. The labor population was freed up and went to industry, government, transportation, trade and finance. All agricultural producers must maintain food safety and comply with regulations, inspections and government monitoring.

Any type of plant production involves consideration of;

- Seeding
- Fertilizer/Nutrients
- Insects
- Weeds
- Disease
- Irrigation
- Harvesting
- Storage

Livestock producer concerns would be:

- Animal Health
- Feeds/Nutrition
- Predators/Pests
- Handling

== Trade ==
=== Saskatchewan Wheat Pool ===
The Saskatchewan Wheat Pool has a network of marketing alliances in North America and internationally which has made it the largest agricultural grain handling operation in the province of Saskatchewan.

== Future challenges ==
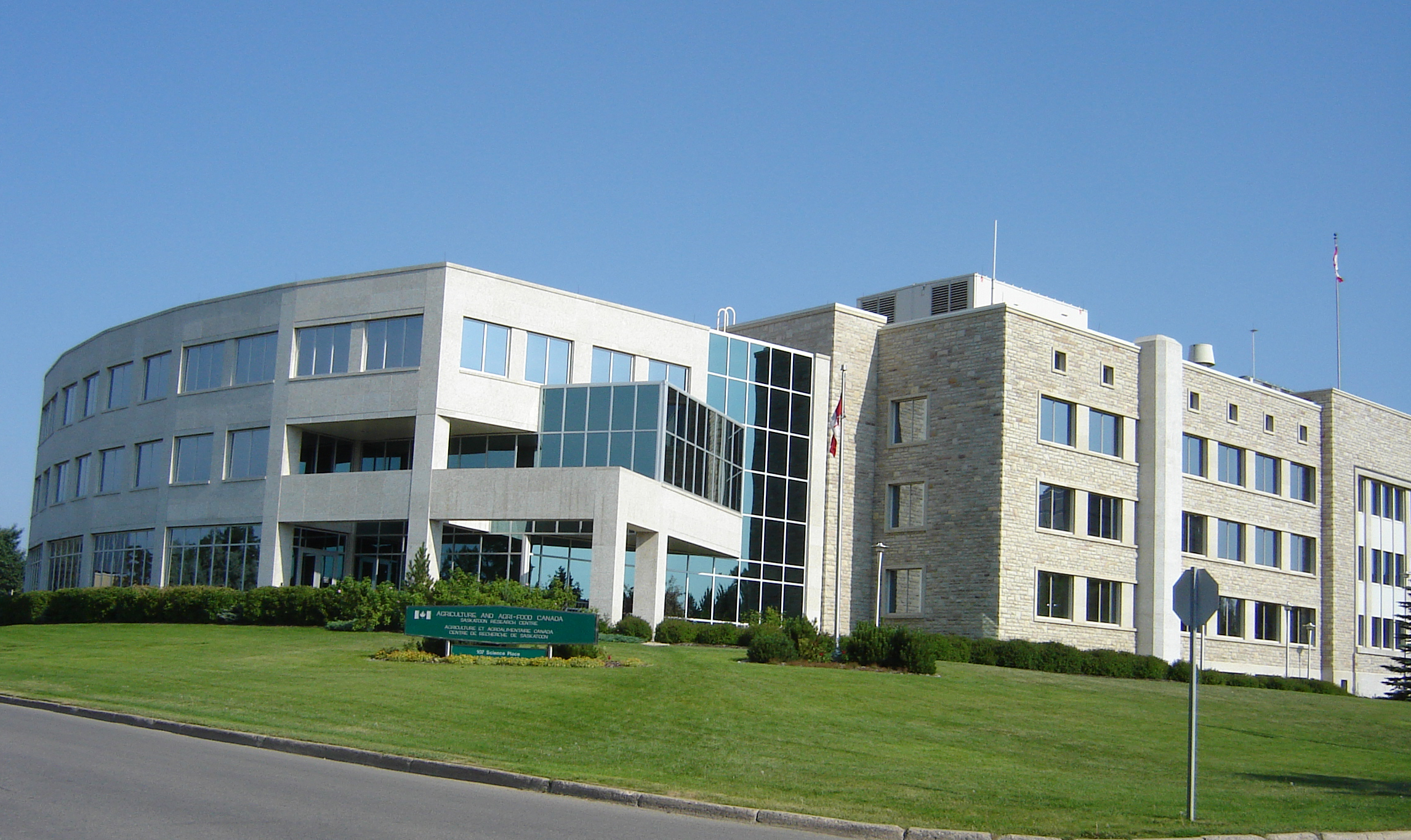
Agriculture Agri-Food Canada Saskatoon Research Centre on Campus

=== Drought ===
The depression and drought of the Dirty Thirties was devastating. Prior to this decade, droughts were cyclical in nature, but did not last over many years as in the 1930s. This drought resulted in a mass exodus of population from the prairies, as well as new agricultural practices such as soil conservation, and crop rotation for a few.

=== Soil conservation and reclamation ===
Soil conservation practices such as crop rotation, cover crops, and windbreaks to name a few were massively developed and set in forth upon recovering from the drought experiences of the dirty thirties. Literally layers and layers of topsoil would be blowing away during this time.

=== Disease and pests ===
Wheat diseases such as wheat bunt and stinking smut can be successfully treated with a fungicide. Disease of plants and animals can break an agricultural producer. Tuberculosis in animals was an early threat, and cattle needed to be tested, and areas accredited in 1956. The newer disease such as chronic wasting disease or transmissible spongiform encephalopathy (TSE) affects both elk and deer. Elk and deer raising is a pioneer field of domestication, has had a setback with this disease. Mad cow disease in cattle and scrapie of sheep are monitored by the Canadian Food Inspection Agency. The poultry sector was plagued by Pullorum disease, and by controlling the flock via poultry husbandry, this disease has been brought under control.

=== Genetically modified crops/animals ===
Plants whose traits can be modified to survive a disease or insect have made inroads into Saskatchewan agricultural practices. Cereal rusts which can destroy the majority of areas seeded to wheat, was controlled in 1938 by breeding strains which were rust-resistant. This strain was successful until around 1950, when again a new strain of rust broke out, and again a new strain called Selkirk was developed which was rust resistant. Biotechnology is the center of new research and regulations affecting agriculture this century.

== Notable people ==
Notable people who have contributed highly to the development the agricultural industry in Saskatchewan have been inducted into the agricultural hall of fame.

- Lawrence Kirk is an agronomist who taught in Saskatchewan universities and helped to control the Dust Bowl in the 1930s.
- Keith Downey is the originators of canola and is nicknamed the Father of Canola .
- Seager Wheeler nicknamed "Wheat King of the prairies" or "The Wheat Wizard of Rosthern"
- Charles E. Saunders was a Canadian agronomist. He was the inventor of Marquis Wheat.
- John Macoun Canadian naturalist.

== Symbols of Saskatchewan ==
The Coat of arms of Saskatchewan features three gold sheaves of wheat, or garbs, represent the province's agriculture; the heraldic sheaf of wheat has become a generalized symbol of the province. The gold lower half of the Flag of Saskatchewan symbolizes the southern, prairie wheat-fields. The provincial symbol is a sheaf of wheat and is generally used to identify government programs and organizations.

== See also ==
- Agriculture in Canada
- Aspen parkland
- Canadian Prairies
- Crow Rate
- Custom harvesting
- Dominion Land Survey
- Flora of Saskatchewan
- Geology of Saskatchewan
- Geography of Saskatchewan
- Great Plains
- Guardian Biotechnologies
- List of agricultural universities and colleges
- List of schools of veterinary medicine
- Maple Leaf Foods
- Motherwell Homestead National Historic Sites of Canada
- Palliser's Triangle
- Regina Exhibition Stadium
- Saskatchewan Agriculture
- Saskatchewan Western Development Museum
- Saskatchewan Forestry Centre
- Semi-arid
