= Arthur Henry Reginald Buller =

British–Canadian mycologist (1874–1944)

Arthur Henry Reginald Buller FRSC FRS
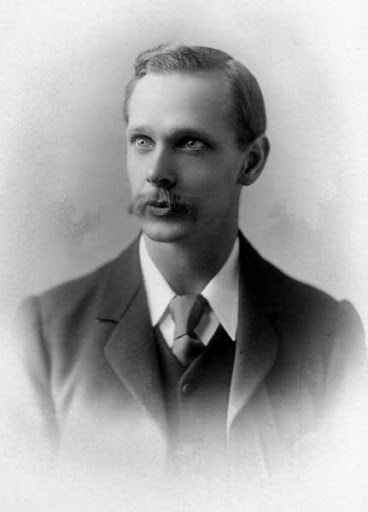
- Arthur Henry Reginald Buller, c.1900
- Born: 19 August 1874; Moseley, Birmingham, England
- Died: 3 July 1944 (aged 69); Winnipeg, Manitoba, Canada
- Citizenship: British-Canadian
- Education: Mason College; University of Birmingham; Queen's College, Taunton; Leipzig University; Ludwig-Maximilians-Universität München
- Awards: 1851 Research Fellowship (1898–1901); Royal Medal (1937); Flavelle Medal (1929); Fellow of the Royal Society
- Scientific career
- Fields: Mycology, Botany
- Workplaces: University of Birmingham; University of Manitoba
- Doctoral advisor: Robert Hartig, Ludwig-Maximilians-Universität München and Wilhelm Pfeffer, Leipzig University
- Author abbrev. (botany): Buller

Arthur Henry Reginald Buller, FRSC, FRS (19 August 1874 – 3 July 1944) was a British-Canadian mycologist and academic. He is mainly known as a researcher of fungi, especially wheat rust.

He is also known for writing limericks.

== Academic career ==
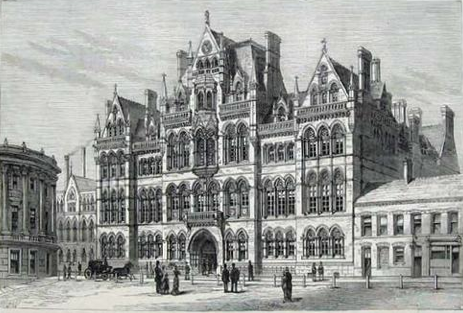
Mason College, now part of the University of Birmingham

Born in Moseley, Birmingham, England, he was educated at Queen's College, Taunton. He then studied at Mason College, which later became part of the University of Birmingham, (B.Sc. in 1896), Leipzig University (Ph.D.), and the Ludwig-Maximilians-Universität München. He was awarded a D.Sc. by the University of Birmingham. He worked briefly for the Naples Zoological Station. From 1901 to 1904, he was a lecturer in Botany at the University of Birmingham. He moved to Canada in 1904, founded the Botany Department and was the first Professor of Botany and Geology at the University of Manitoba, and served as Head of the Botany Department until his retirement in 1936.

His book Essays on Wheat (Macmillan, 1919) deals with the early history of wheat-growing in Manitoba, wheat-growing in western Canada, the discovery and introduction of Marquis wheat, the origin of the wheat varieties Red Bobs and Kitchener, and Palestine's wild wheat. He wrote and illustrated a 7-volume series Researches on Fungi published in 6 volumes from 1909 to 1934 with the 7th volume published posthumously in 1950.

== Poetry ==
He also wrote limericks, some of which were published in Punch, including this one on Einstein's special theory of relativity:

There was a young lady named Bright,
Whose speed was far faster than light;
She started one day
In a relative way,
And returned on the previous night.

— A. H. Reginald Buller in Punch (19 December 1923): 591.

== Honours ==
He was elected a Fellow of the Royal Society of Canada (FRSC) in 1909, and became its President in 1927. He was the President of the British Mycological Society in 1914. In 1929, he was awarded the Royal Society of Canada's Flavelle Medal. In 1937, he was elected a Fellow of the Royal Society (FRS). He was a life member of the Mycological Society of America.

He was awarded honorary degrees from the University of Saskatchewan, University of Calcutta, University of Manitoba, and University of Pennsylvania. The Buller Building at the University of Manitoba, built in 1932, is named in his honour.

Professional and academic associations
Preceded by James Henry Coyne	President of the Royal Society of Canada; 1927–1928	Succeeded by Camille Roy
