= David Fife =

Canadian farmer (1805-1877)

David Alexander Fife
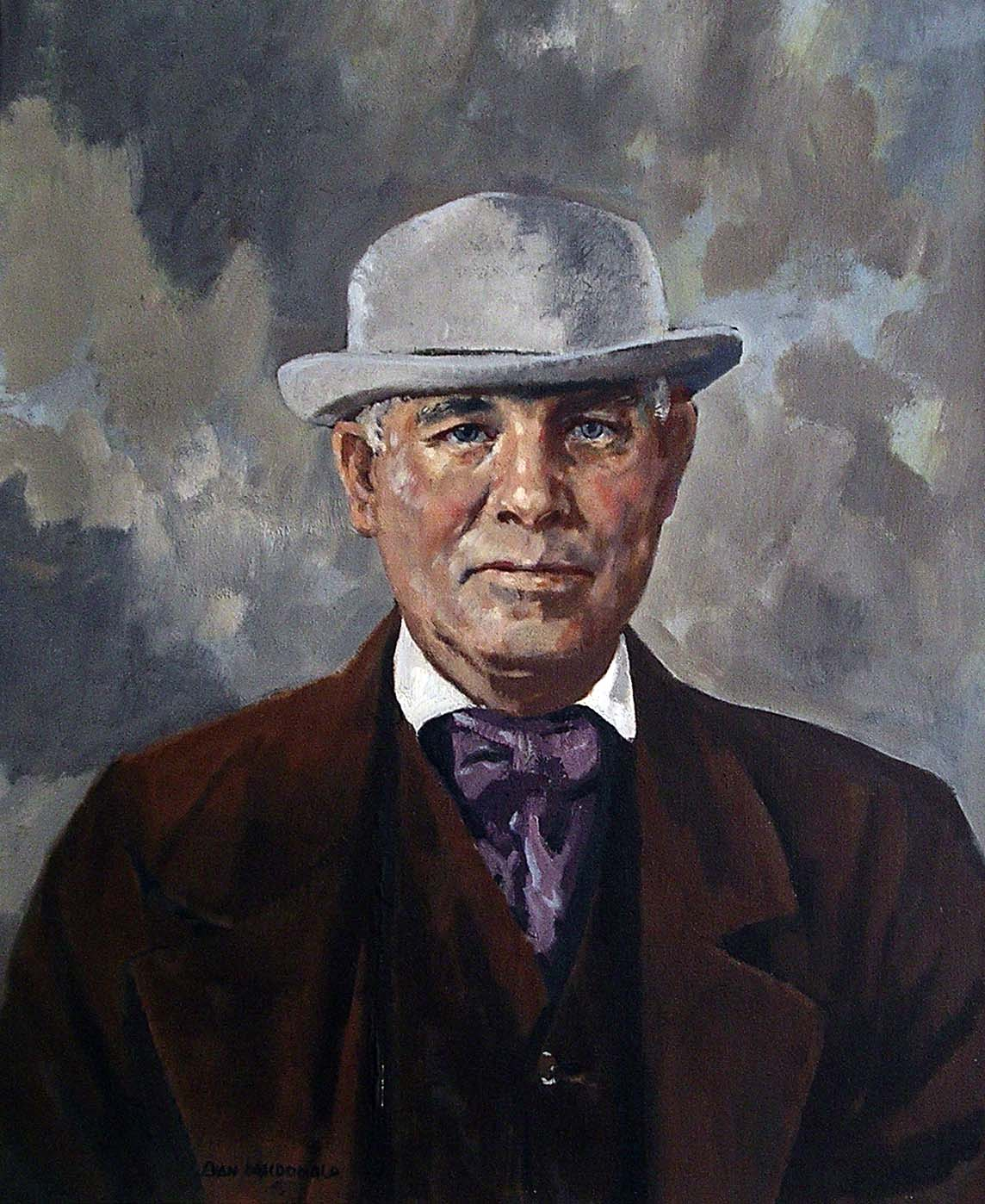
- "David Fife, operator of the first experimental farm in Canada and developer of Red Fife Wheat
- Born: August 22, 1805; Kincardine, Scotland
- Died: January 9, 1877 (aged 71); Otonabee, Ontario
- Occupations: farmer, inventor, businessman
- Spouse: Jane Beckett (1808–1888) (m. 1825–1877)
- Children: David Alexander Jr. (1829–1901); John Alexander (1829–1907); Agnes (1835–??); Sylvester Hutchison (1835–1911); Jane (1837–1891); James Alexander (1839–1920); Mary (1841–??); Thomas (1839–1852); Ellen (??–??)
- Parent(s): John Fife Sr. (1773–1859); Agnes Hutchison (1773–1853)

David Alexander Fife (1805–1877) was a Scottish-born Canadian farmer credited with developing the variety of wheat which later became known as Red Fife.

== Biography ==
David Alexander Fife was born at Kincardine, Scotland in 1805. In 1820, his family immigrated to Otonabee Township in Peterborough County, Upper Canada, and took up farming.

== Development of Red Fife ==
In the early 1840s, the farmers in the Midlands area of Canada West—the new name for Upper Canada after the 1840 Act of Union—grew a winter wheat variety known as Siberian. It had been introduced to Canada in the hope that it would survive the severe Canadian winters. But the Siberian wheat variety was susceptible to rust and its yields were low.

David Fife wrote to a friend in Glasgow asking for samples of good seed wheat. His friend obtained a sample of wheat off a ship from Danzig, Prussia, (now Gdańsk, Poland) and sent it to Fife. As it came to Fife's hand just before spring seeding time, and, not knowing whether it was a fall or spring variety, Mr. Fife decided to sow a part of it that spring, and wait for the result. It proved to be fall wheat as most of it never ripened. Three ears, however, which grew from a single grain did reach maturity.

Two possibilities exist: that the single grain from which the three heads grew was an accidental hybrid, or that the single seed kernel was a spring wheat variety mixed in with a winter wheat strain. In any case, Fife preserved the seeds from the ears that had matured, sowed them the following year where they grew to be entirely free of rust. Fife continued to carefully husband the seeds harvested, and by 1848 had accumulated 240 bushels of the new variety which he distributed to his neighbors for seed. By 1860, Red Fife had supplanted all other varieties in use in Canada. Red Fife soon became the standard variety of "hard spring" wheat in North America and by the end of the 19th century was widely considered as the world's best spring wheat because of its resistance to rust, early maturing, high productivity and excellent milling and baking qualities.

== Legacy ==
A stone cairn honouring David Fife was erected in 1964 of out of ordinary field stone, with a brass plate inscribed with a brief history of Red Fife, on Ontario Highway #7, eight miles to the east of Peterborough. The official unveiling was carried out by Donald Fife, a descendant. This plaque was later moved to Lang Pioneer Village Museum at Keene, Ontario.

Red Fife wheat would later be used as the male parent by Dominion Agriculturalist Charles Saunders in development of Marquis wheat, a cultivar that for a time in the early 20th century was grown on 90% of prairie farms.
