= Red Wheat (disambiguation) =

Red Wheat is a 1970 Yugoslavian drama film.

Red Wheat may also refer to:

- Red Fife wheat, a wheat variety grown in Canada
- Soft red wheat, hard red winter wheat, or hard red spring, classifications of wheat in the United States

== See also ==
- Wheat (Triticum spp.), grasses grown as cereal grain crops
