= History of agriculture in Canada =

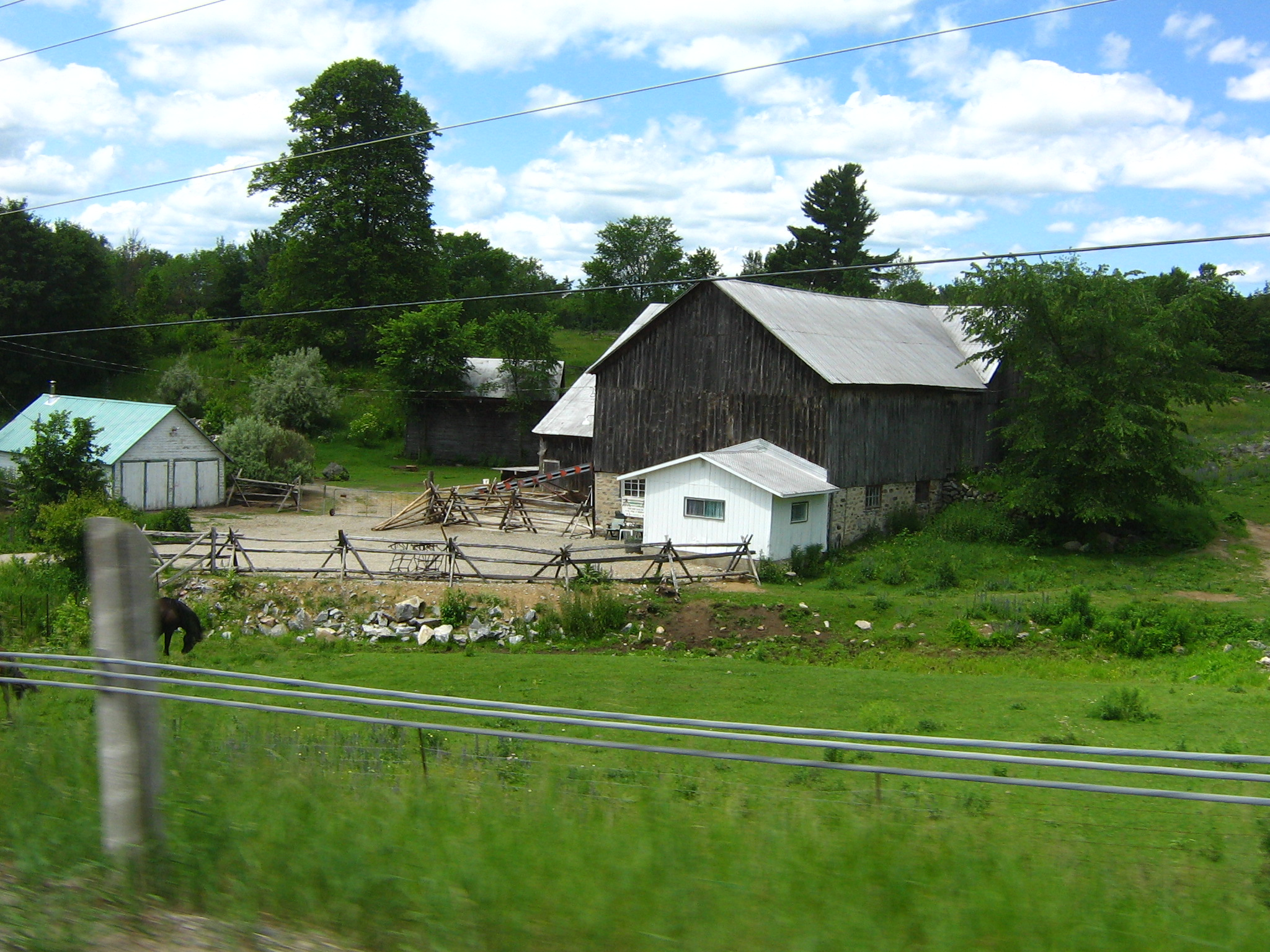
Farm yard in summer, eastern Ontario

In the 16th century Samuel de Champlain and Gabriel Sagard recorded that the Iroquois and Huron cultivated the soil for maize or "Indian corn". Maize (Zea mays), beans (phaseolus), squash (Cucurbita) and the sunflower (Helianthus annus) were grown throughout agricultural lands in North America by the 16th century. As early as 2300 BC evidence of squash was introduced to the northeastern woodlands region. Archaeological findings from 500 AD have shown corn cultivation in southern Ontario.

Eastern Canada was settled well before the West. Immigration and trading posts came later to Rupert's Land and the Northwest Territories. The early immigrants combined European agricultural and domestication procedures with the indigenous knowledge of the land and animals of the area.

As early as 1605, the French Acadians built dikes in the Maritimes for wheat, flax, vegetables, pasturage and marshland farming. Dairy production is the main contribution of New Brunswick, Nova Scotia, and Prince Edward Island, along with livestock and mixed farming ventures. A small percentage of land is put into use in fruit farming as well along Nova Scotia's northwest coastal areas. The American Revolution, 1775–1783, and its attendant food decline resulted in 3100 hectares cleared in Newfoundland. In the early 19th century Irish immigrants began arriving who cultivated the land in Newfoundland. A very small percentage of the land is suitable in Newfoundland and Labrador for horticultural or crop production because there is a lot of forested and tundra geography. The province has some dairy production and farming concerns. Following World War II, farm training was available at the Government Demonstration Farm. Bonuses were paid for such things as the purchase of pure-bred sires, land clearing, and agriculture exhibition assistance to name a few. The industry of fish processing for food is the largest agricultural contribution from Newfoundland. Newfoundland fisheries, supply cod for the most part, followed closely by herring, haddock, lobster, rose fish, seals, and whales. The fishing industry depends very heavily upon exports and world conditions.

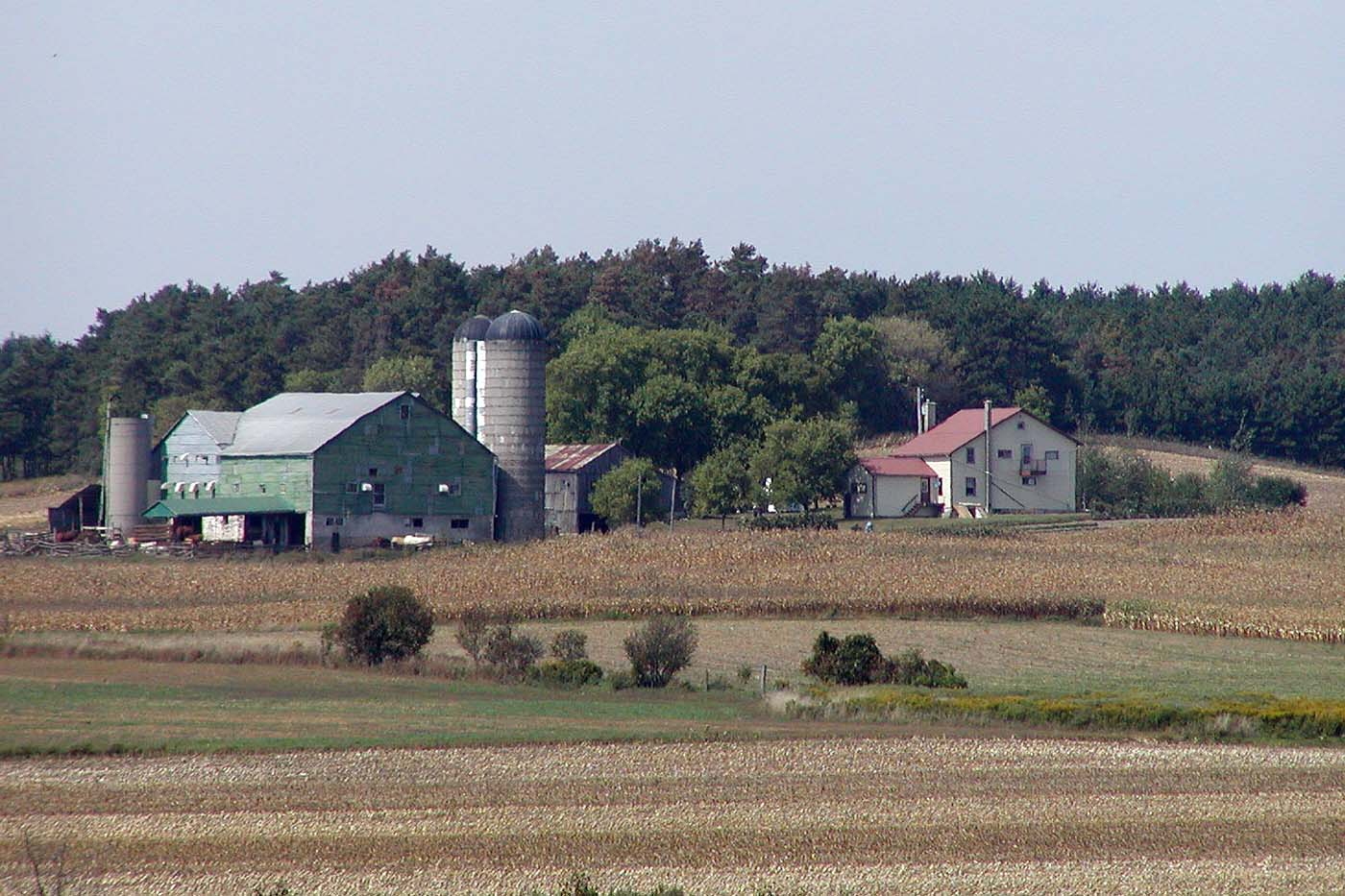
southwestern Ontario farm

Agriculture in the West started with Peter Pond gardening plots at Lake Athabasca in 1778. Although large-scale agriculture was still many years off, Hudson's Bay Company traders, gold rush miners, and missionaries cultivated crops, gardens and raised livestock. The Northwest Territories, Yukon, and Nunavut are covered with the Canadian Shield, and rocky outcrops, sub Arctic forest soils, and stony phases make up most of the geography. It is an area of comparatively smaller population and not commercially exploited for the most part. Whaling, prawns, and trapping food processing contribute to agricultural food production here.

In New France hops, hemp and livestock were introduced in 1663. The seigneurial system of farming was adopted in Quebec. Quebec's agricultural sector relies heavily on its fruit and vegetable production. In 1890, a competition began to encourage farmers to improve their farms to achieve the Agricultural Merit Order. County farm improvement contests were begun about 1930 involving over 5,000 farms and their evolution over five years. They have some interests in livestock and mixed farming and dairy as well. From 1947, an artificial insemination and breeding centre has been operating in Saint-Hyacinthe, Quebec for breeders clubs.

== Indigenous farming ==
Canadian officials saw farming as one possible key to assimilating Indigenous peoples on the Canadian prairies in the nineteenth century. Some Indigenous nations also saw farming as a key practice to help adapt to rapidly changing circumstances, including the decline of bison populations. As such, agricultural promises became part of a number of Treaty negotiations. However, some Canadian policies, like the Peasant Farm Policy, ultimately undermined the ability of First Nations to viably farm on reserves. According to historian Sarah Carter, such policies were designed in part to limit the competitiveness of reserve farming.

== Wheat ==
The British enforced Corn (Cereal grains) laws, 1794–1846, protected the British agricultural sector from imports of British North American wheat. The Reciprocity Treaty, 6 June 1854, developed a trade agreement between Canada and the United States which affected trade of wheat grown in Ontario. Northern Ontario is mainly tundra and forested area, whereas southern Ontario has lands suitable for livestock and general farming as well as geography suitable for pasture and dairying industries. Fruit farming can also be found in southern Ontario. Ontario is the largest producer of mixed grains, soybeans and shelled corn in the country. The province is also home to nearly all tobacco farms in Canada, the majority being situated in the Ontario tobacco belt. In the 2011 Canadian Census there were 137 tobacco farms located in Ontario, three in Quebec, and one on Prince Edward Island.

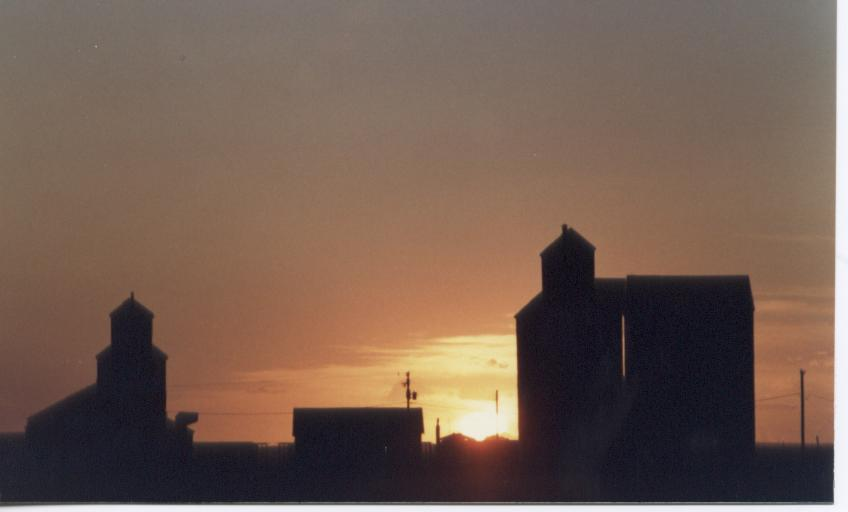
Grain Elevators, Alberta

Lord Selkirk, founder of the Red River Colony, harvested the first wheat crop in the western prairies in 1814. Red Fife wheat was introduced in 1868. Swine were brought to the Red River colony as early as 1819. The frontier land of southwest Alberta and southeast Saskatchewan were opened to ranching in the 19th century. Manitoba has a combination of mixed grain, livestock, and mixed farming industries in its southernmost areas. Cattle ranching around Lake Manitoba is also quite successful. Northern Manitoba consists of extensive lakes and forested geographical areas. The Dominion Lands Act of 1872 offered agricultural pioneers an opportunity to "prove up" a quarter section of land (160 acres/65 hectares) in western Canada for a $10.00 filing fee and three years of improvements combined with residence on the land. Saskatchewan still has cattle ranching along its southwestern corner; grain farming and crops such as wheat, oats, flax, alfalfa, and rapeseed (especially canola) dominate the parkland area. Mixed grain farming, dairy farms, mixed livestock and grazing lands dot the central lowlands region of this prairie province.

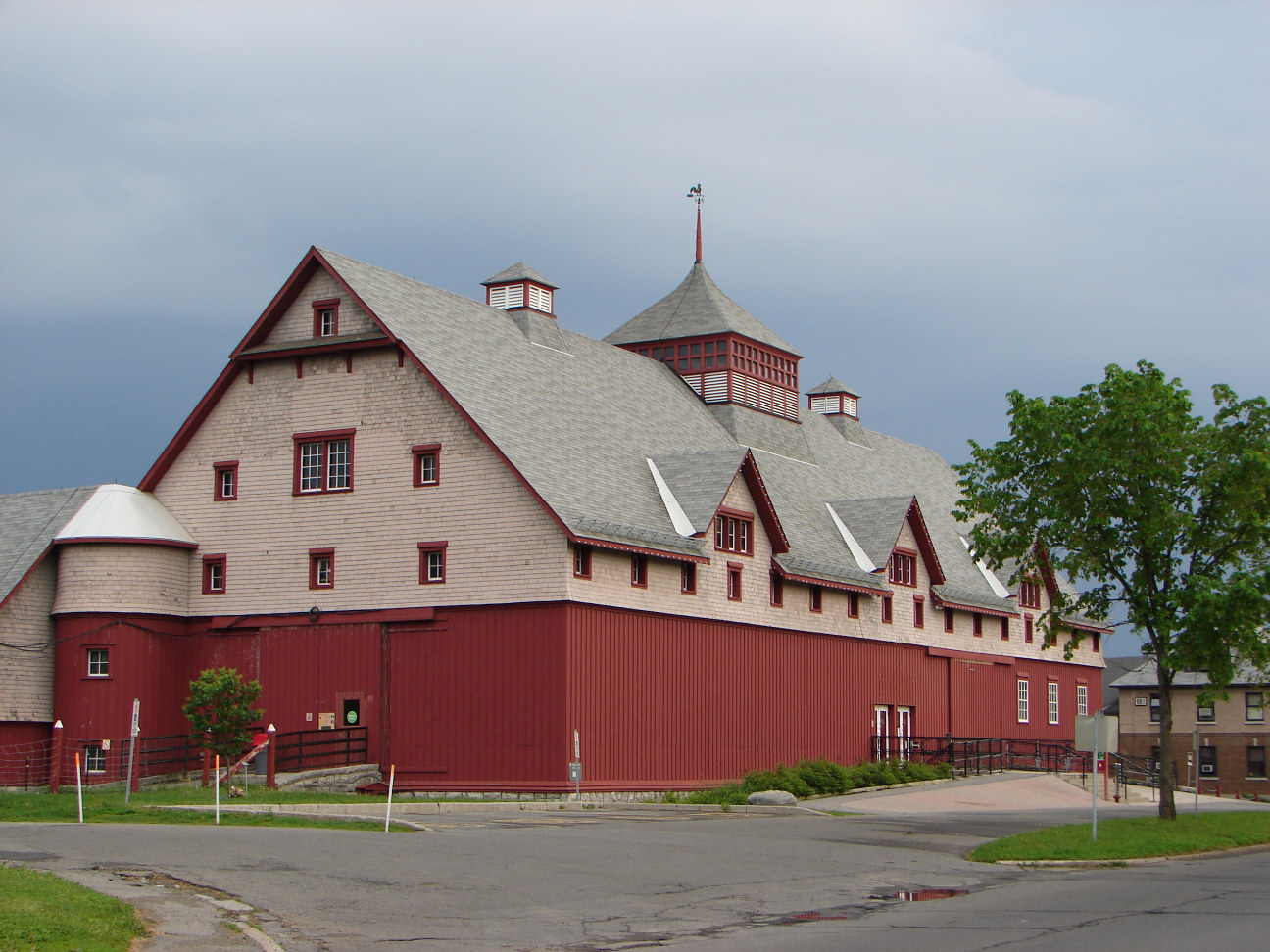
Canada Agriculture Museum, Ottawa

Alberta is renowned still for its stampedes, and cattle ranching is a main industry. The agricultural industry is supplemented by livestock and mixed farming and wheat crops. Alberta is the second largest producer of wheat in Canada. Grain and dairying also play a role in the livelihoods of Alberta farmers.

The open parkland area extends across the three prairie provinces: Manitoba, Saskatchewan and Alberta. Canada's production of wheat, oats, flaxseed, and barley come mainly from this area. Meat processing is the largest industry here, followed by dairy production, breweries, and the subsidiary industry of agricultural implements.

Between 1896 and 1920 the great Canadian wheat boom was stimulated by rising prices, railway construction and prairie settlement, and supported by new agricultural technology. In 1923 Canada supplied 53.3% of British grain imports and was the world's largest wheat exporter. Britain was still the country's major wheat export market well into the 1960s. The prairies became one of the world's most monocultural landscapes, wheat being 80% or 90% of all the crop in many areas. The network of railways, canals and elevators extended for nearly 3000 miles. Grain standards were established by the Grain Standards Committee and became the standard of the world. Up to 2000 boxcars were inspected in Winnipeg daily with samples taken from each car through 11 equidistant coincident apertures to establish a cross section of the entire truck. The terminal elevators in Port Arthur, Ontario and Fort William, Ontario handled more wheat than any other port on earth.

== British Columbia ==
British Columbia is covered in highlands; its eastern boundary is the Rocky Mountains. Agricultural production in British Columbia supplied the gold rush industry, mining and logging industries. Agricultural producers relied on these local markets, following the economic boom and bust of each enterprise respectively. The British Columbia Fruit-Growers' Association was established in 1889 to foster an export market of this commodity. The Canada Agriculture Museum preserves Canadian agricultural history. In 2015, there are approximately 20,000 farms in B.C. that are involved in agricultural activity, such as dairy, livestock, fruit and vegetable farming.

== See also ==
- Agriculture in Canada
- History of agriculture
