= William Edwin Saunders =

Canadian naturalist

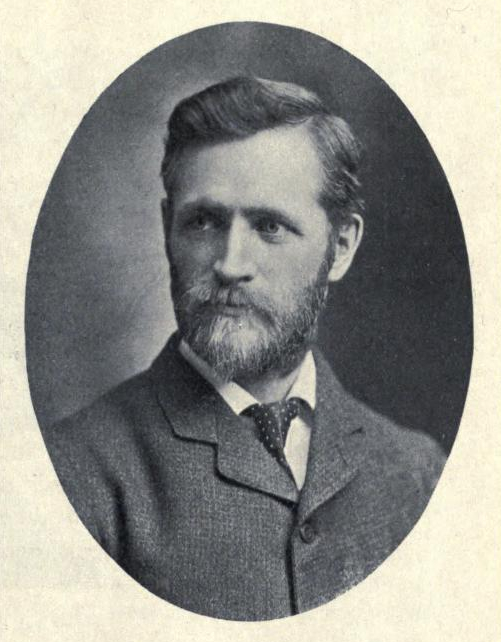
Portrait in Bird Lore (1903)

William Edwin Saunders (16 August 1861 – 28 June 1943) was a Canadian naturalist. He contributed to the studies of birds and mammals in Canada. He served as the founding president of the Federation of Ontario Naturalists. He was a brother of the plant breeder Charles E. Saunders.

Saunders was born in London, Canada West, to William Saunders senior (1836-1914), a founding director of the Dominion Experimental Farm in Ottawa, and Sarah Agnes Robinson, a botanist whose rare collection of plant specimens became a crucial component of the National Herbarium of Canada. Saunders went to local schools. He then studied chemistry at Trinity College School and graduated from the Philadelphia College of Pharmacy in 1883. Saunders founded the Mcllwraith Ornithological Club in London in 1890. For a while Saunders headed the chemistry department of the newly created Western University.

Saunders married Emma Lee in 1885 and they had a daughter, Muriel. He donated most of his collections to the National Museum, Ottawa and the Royal Ontario Museum, Toronto.
