= Lang Pioneer Village Museum =

Living history museum in Peterborough County, Ontario, Canada

Coordinates: 44°16′35″N 78°10′18″W

Lang Pioneer Village Museum Logo

Lang Pioneer Village Museum is a living history museum located in the hamlet of Lang in Peterborough County, Ontario. It was established in 1967 by the County of Peterborough. Lang Pioneer Village is situated on the shores of the historic Indian River. Lang Pioneer Village is an "outdoor museum" featuring more than 30 restored and furnished buildings, many of which were donated from the surrounding townships. The buildings, constructed between 1820 and 1910, are interpreted by costumed villagers portraying authentic 19th-century pioneer life. Since 2014 the Museum has been the site of the Aabnaabin Encampment, a pre-colonization representation of a Michi Saagiig camp where the story of the First Nations history and culture of the region is told by indigenous interpreters. Lang Pioneer Village Museum is owned and operated by the County of Peterborough.

== Heritage buildings ==
=== Homes ===
David Fife Cabin - This 1820s log cabin is typical of the settler's first one-room log home. Built by David Fife, a Scottish immigrant, the cabin is currently located in the village only a few miles from its original site. David Fife was the pioneer of Red Fife Wheat production in Canada. Red Fife Wheat was grown locally and ground into flour at the Lang Grist Mill.

Ayotte Homestead - Built prior to 1841, the Ayotte Homestead was moved from its original site on Clear Lake in Smith Township. During the summer months, the wood stove was moved to the summer kitchen so that it did not heat up the house. During the winter months, the stove would be moved back into the primary house and the summer kitchen would be used for cold storage.

Fitzpatrick House - Built in the 1840s, the Fitzpatrick House represents a settler's second home. It is a storey-and-a-half log home featuring a six-foot-wide stone fireplace which served the dual purposes of heating and cooking. The main living area included the parent's bedroom and a sitting room upstairs and two bedrooms and a large utility area that also served as a sleeping area.

Milburn House - The Milburn House represents the more luxurious lifestyle of some settlers. Built in the 1850s, the Milburn House has been restored to reflect life in 1877 and features many of the comforts and luxuries of the 1870s.

=== Businesses and trades ===
Hastie Carpenter Shop - The Hastie Carpenter Shop is a careful reconstruction of an original, local 1880s carpenter shop. Throughout the summer, carpenters demonstrate wood-working techniques used by the settlers to create hand-made objects.

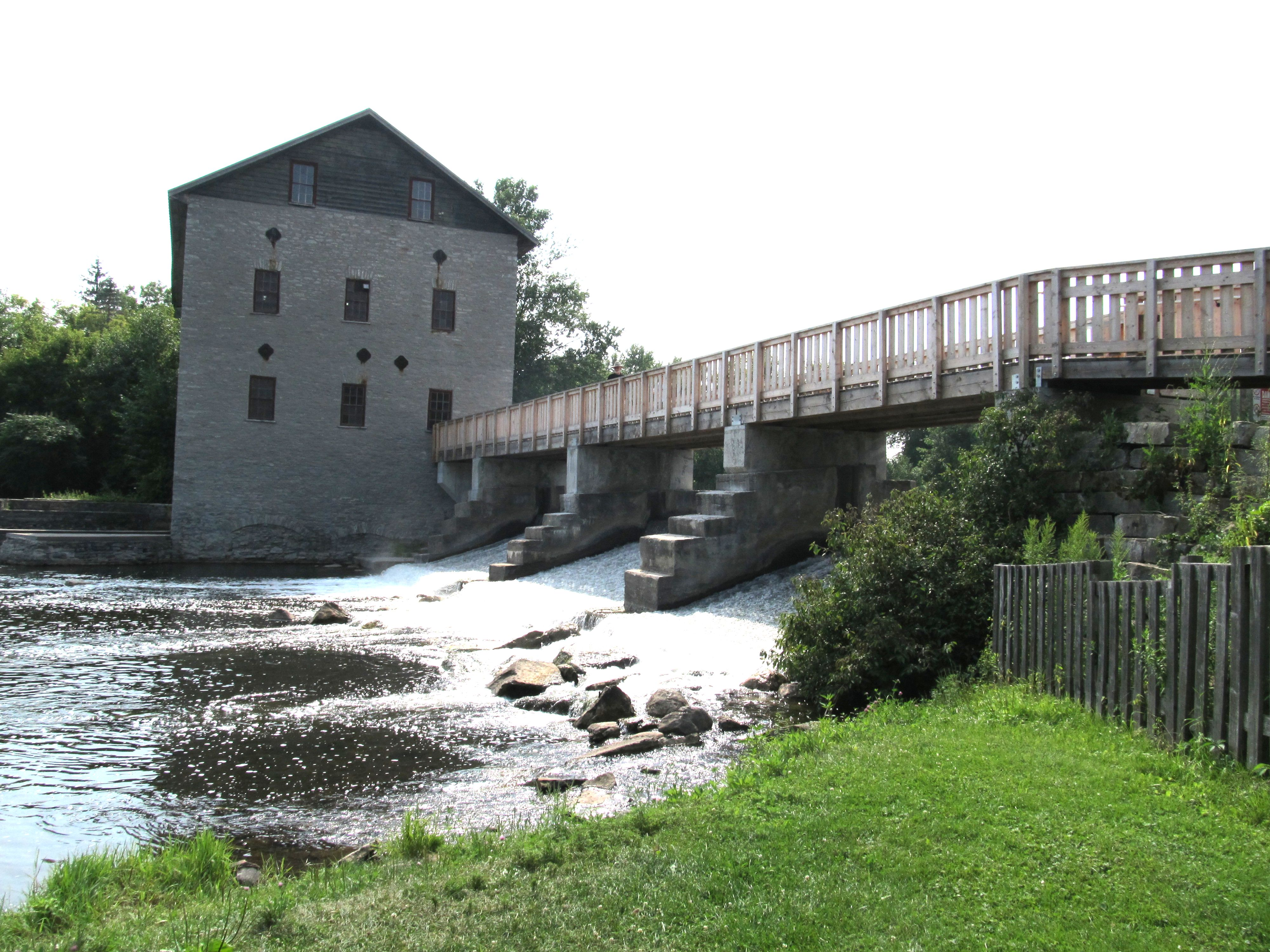
Mill at Lang Pioneer Village Keene Ontario

Tinsmith Shop - The Tinsmith Shop is a reconstruction of a 19th-century shop demonstrating the skilled craft of tinsmithing. Examples of tinware can be found throughout the village. By the late 19th century, tinware was in nearly every home and farm.

Lang Grist Mill - A working three-storey mill, the Lang Mill was constructed in 1846 by Thomas Short. Over 160 years later, visitors can still see wheat being ground into flour at the mill throughout the summer.

Shingle Mill - Before the Shingle Mill, early settlers had to make their own shingles by splitting cedar with a froe (a tool with a long iron blade that was struck with a heavy mallet) and then shaved to the proper thickness with a drawknife. With the Shingle Mill, hundreds of shingles could be produced in an hour. The cedar shingles on some of the building in the Village were made by this mill.

Keene Hotel - Originally built in the 1830s (front section) and the 1940s (rear wing), the Keene Hotel has been restored to be representative of a country inn of the 1870s. The best bedroom at the hotel in the 1840s cost 75 cents per night. A straw tick in the flop room cost 10 cents per night.

Cheese Factory - The Cheese Factory, moved from Mathers Corners in Otonabee Township, was built in 1876. The equipment housed inside the building is from Warkworth. The Cheese Factory could form 40 pounds of cheese curd from 400 pounds of milk under the watchful eye of a cheese maker.

Blacksmith Shop - The Blacksmith Shop was essential to the life of any 19th-century community. Built in 1859, the Blacksmith Shop has been restored to 1880. The blacksmith would shoe horses, "iron" sleighs and wagons, make tools and architectural hardware and do repairs. He could also make most of his own equipment. The watering trough located outside the Blacksmith Shop was originally owned by Campbell's Dairy in Peterborough.

Register Print Shop - The Print Shop, built in the 1840s, was used to print handbills announcing sales, public notices of election, community event notices and the weekly newspaper for the community. The printer was one of the few well-educated individuals in the village. The Register Print Shop at Lang Pioneer Village has been restored to represent a print shop in the 1880s.

S. W. Lowry Weaver Shop & Jacquard Loom Interpretive Centre - The S. W. Lowry Weaver Shop is a replica 19th-century weaver's shop and features a restored 19th-century Jacquard loom and fully functioning loom replica. An exhibit/educational area demonstrates the step-by-step process of how fleece from a sheep becomes a woven fabric.

=== Community services ===
Douro Township Hall - The Douro Township Hall was built in 1871 at a cost of $365. The building has been restored to 1897 when council members were no longer elected by an open "show of hands" but by secret ballot.

South Lake School - The schoolhouse was the first building moved to the site of Lang Pioneer Village. Built in 1886, the schoolhouse interior reveals much about rural school-life featuring double-desks, slates, an abacus and a wood stove for heating.

Glen Alda Church - The church played an important role in settlers’ lives. Built in 1898, the Glen Alda Church was moved from Chandos Township. Located at the front of the sanctuary is a fine crafted Doherty pump organ, manufactured 100 years ago. The driveshed located to the west of the church is where the horse and buggies would have been sheltered during the service.

Menie General Store & Post Office- Originally built in 1858, the General Store has been restored to 1899. Almost everything could be purchased from the store. Farm produce would often be bartered for store goods.

=== Food preservation ===
Cider Barn - After the apple harvest, farmers from the surrounding area would converge on the Cider Barn where a wooden cylinder studded with nails would chew the apples into a pulp and then the juice pressed from the pulp.

Smoke House - To ensure that meat would last throughout the winter and following summer, meat was salted, pickled and then finally smoked in the Smoke House for about six weeks. The Smoke House at Lang Pioneer Village is a reconstruction circa the 1850s.

Ice House - Ice blocks were cut in the coldest winter weather using an ice saw. The blocks had to be perfectly square in order to make it easier to load and haul. Sawdust was used in the icehouse as an insulator. The sawdust was so effective that a harvest of ice put in place in cold weather and properly packed with sawdust could last several years. The Ice House at Lang Pioneer Village is a reconstruction circa the 1850s.

=== Sources of power ===
- Wind - By the late 19th century many farmers were harnessing the wind to provide power for a variety of purposes. The windmill at Lang Pioneer Village was originally located on the Manson Cathcart farm in Peterborough
- Water - Water flowing from the Indian River, powers the turbines at the Lang Grist Mill
- Steam - Steam power made many tasks more productive for settlers. Examples of steam powered tasks that can be found at Lang Pioneer Village are the Shingle Mill powered by Lang's own Sawyer-Massey Steam Engine and grain thrashing. Manufactured in 1921, the Sawyer-Massey Steam Engine is the power source for sawing and edging the shingles at the Shingle Mill. The Steam Engine has been owned and operated by Lang Pioneer Village since 1985.
- Animal - By the 1860s, horse power had reached the peak of mechanical efficiency and most farmers owned one of some make or another. Horse-drawn farm implements can be found in Lang's Agricultural Barn while horse-drawn vehicles can be found in Lang's Transportation Barn.

=== Display Buildings ===
Modelled after many turn-of-the-century barns, the Peterborough County Agricultural Heritage Building is a community project that was designed by Lett Architects to depict the history of agricultural practices in the region. Built in 2017, the Peterborough County Agricultural Heritage Building (PCAHB) is home to the Peterborough County Agricultural Hall of Fame, recognizing important individuals and families who made and make significant contributions to the agricultural community in Peterborough and the Kawarthas. The building houses an extensive number of agricultural implements, including the Museum's Peter Hamilton collection of tools and equipment, as well as a restoration workshop and conservation lab with viewing windows.

== Education programs ==
Lang Pioneer Village Museum offers a variety of educational programs that correspond directly with the Ontario school curriculum as set by the Provincial Government.

== Special events ==
Lang Pioneer Village hosts the following special events each year:

- Annual Father's Day Smoke & Steam Show
- Transportation Day Car & Motorcycle Show
- Anniversary Weekend Celebration (theme varies each year)
- Applefest
- Historic All Hallow's Eve
- Christmas by Candlelight

As well as these annual events there are other special displays, workshops, activities and musical events from time to time.

== Visiting information ==
Lang Pioneer Village Museum is located 10 km east of Peterborough at 104 Lang Road, just off of County Rd 34 (Heritage Line) in Otonabee-South Monaghan Township. Lang Pioneer Village is open to the visiting public from approximately mid-May to Labour Day and seasonally for special events and workshops.
