= Frederick Albert Saunders =

Physicist and professor

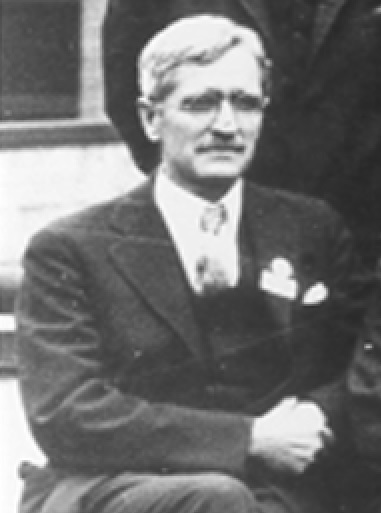
- Saunders at Bell in 1928
- Born: August 18, 1875; London, Ontario, Canada
- Died: June 9, 1963 (aged 87); South Hadley, Massachusetts, U.S.
- Parent: William Saunders

Academic background
- Education: University of Toronto (A.B.); Johns Hopkins University (PhD)
- Doctoral advisor: Henry A. Rowland

Academic work
- Discipline: Physics
- Institutions: Haverford College (1899–1901); Syracuse University (1901–1914); Vassar College (1914–1919); National Research Council (1917–1919); General Electric Research Laboratory; Harvard University (1919–1963)

Frederick Albert Saunders (August 18, 1875 – June 9, 1963) was a Canadian-born American physicist and academic remembered for his work in sub-infrared spectroscopy and acoustics.

== Early life ==
Frederick Albert Saunders was born on August 18, 1875, in London, Ontario, a son of William Saunders and Sarah Agnes Saunders, née Robinson, both of whom were born in England and emigrated to Canada at an early age. His father was renowned in the fields of orchard pests and fruit hybridization, was a founding member of the Entomological Society of Ontario and published books including Insects Injurious to Fruits (1883, J. B. Lippincott & Co.) and numerous scientific papers. He was recognized with honorary degrees from several universities and by honours from King George VI.

Saunders graduated with a Bachelor of Arts from the University of Toronto in 1895. Saunders studied physics at Johns Hopkins University and worked under Henry A. Rowland, a pioneer in use of diffraction gratings for spectroscopy, graduating PhD in 1899.

== Career ==
He tutored in physics at Haverford College from 1899 to 1901, then at Syracuse University, where he reached the status of professor in 1914. At Syracuse he worked with Alfred Fowler studying spectra in the far infra-red region, and during his sabbatical year 1913–14 worked with Friedrich Paschen at the University of Tübingen. Shortly after his return to America in 1914, he took a teaching position at Vassar College, and during World War I worked with Augustus Trowbridge (1870–1934), Karl Taylor Compton and Henry Norris Russell, developing methods of sound ranging. With Russell he would later develop Russell–Saunders coupling. In 1918 he worked as spectroscopist under R. A. Millikan at the National Research Council in Washington, D.C., followed by a short stint at the General Electric Research Laboratory in Schenectady, New York, as the guest of Willis Whitney, from 1917 to 1919.

After a brief return to Vassar, he was invited to Harvard University by Theodore Lyman to continue his spectrographic work, then was appointed by that institution to take over the fundamentals course from the recently deceased Wallace C. Sabine, and held that position for 22 years. His textbook, A Survey of Physics for College Students, initially given a lukewarm reception by students, went through several editions. He was a professor at Harvard from 1919 to 1963. He was a visiting lecturer at Mount Holyoke College from 1942 to 1948.

Frederick Albert Saunders is one of the founders of the Acoustical Society of America (ASA). with other renowned acousticians, at the Bell headquarters in New York City, on December 27, 1928.

== Death ==
Saunders died on June 9, 1963, at his home in South Hadley, Massachusetts.
