= Custom harvesting =

In agriculture, custom harvesting or custom combining is the business of harvesting of crops for others. Custom harvesters usually own their own combines and work for the same farms every harvest season. Custom harvesting relieves farmers from having to invest capital in expensive equipment while at the same time maximizing the machinery's use.

The custom harvesting industry has its roots in the mid-twentieth century. Before the invention of the combine harvester, farmers usually owned their own harvesting machinery and worked in tandem with migrant workers, who would bring their own threshing equipment. As combines became more and more widespread, the demand for migrant labor decreased. Custom harvesters, owning their own combines, existed beginning in the 1920s, albeit on a small scale. However, World War II caused a labor and materials shortage, and the custom harvesting industry experienced a great growth. In North America, the area from Texas to Saskatchewan was heavily traversed by custom harvesters. In 1942, there were approximately 500 such operators in this range, but by 1947 that number had grown to 8,000 in Kansas alone. Over the years, the industry transformed from one being run solely by men into family-run businesses. Harvesters would pass their routes and clients down to their children, thus turning custom combining into family tradition.

Custom combiners charge for their services in several ways: a flat per-unit of land price, a per-bale price, or a percentage of the crop. One of the biggest problems for farmers who hire custom harvesters is the availability of labor and the timing of the harvest. If the harvester cannot be available right when the crops are ready, there is the risk of low harvest (if too early) or spoilage (if too late).

The number of custom harvesters has dropped in modern times due to a number of reasons. For one, the consolidation of farms into large-scale operations has allowed them to operate on economies of scale such that they do not need to rely on contractors. Competition is another reason. In China, custom harvesting became such a popular profession in the late 20th century that too many people entered the industry and prices became too low to generate a profit.

== See also ==
- Wild Harvest, a 1947 film starring Alan Ladd, Robert Preston and Dorothy Lamour depicting the lives of custom harvesters.
- Amber Wave (TVM) (1980), starring Kurt Russell and Dennis Weaver
- Race Against the Harvest (1987), starring Wayne Rogers, Mariclare Costello, Fredric Lehne, Matt McCoy.
- The 2000 Mile Harvest, produced and directed by Dylan Winter
- Custom Cutters, produced and directed by Dylan Winter
