= Saskatchewan Forestry Centre =

The Saskatchewan Forest Centre (SFC) was a non-profit organization founded in 2001 to improve the knowledge base for the forestry sector in the Canadian province of Saskatchewan. It was described in 2006 as "now the focal point for forest knowledge and innovation in the province." It was disbanded in 2009. The name was also applied to the building in Prince Albert, Saskatchewan that housed the organization and other forest sector tenants. The Centre's Board of Directors included representatives of industry, government agencies, and Aboriginal groups involved in forest development.

== Funders ==
The Centre was funded by several provincial and federal government agencies, as follows:

Federal funding:

- Canadian Forest Service
- Western Economic Diversification Canada

Provincial funding:

- Saskatchewan Department of Industry and Resources
- Saskatchewan Department of Environment
- Saskatchewan Department of Agriculture, Food and Rural Revitalization

== Organisation ==
The Centre delivered its services through several units, which operated in partnership with other organisations, to achieve its aims. These units were:

- Value Added Unit, in partnership with the Forintek Canada Corporation
- Fire/Forest Ecosystems Unit, in partnership with GeoSpatial Consulting Inc. and the Forest Engineering Research Institute of Canada (FERIC)
- Agroforestry Unit, in partnership with the Canadian Forest Service
- Forest Information Centre Unit, in partnership with the Saskatchewan Dept. of Environment
- Niche Opportunities Unit, run solely by the Saskatchewan Forest Centre

These units worked cooperatively within the Saskatchewan Forest Centre, reporting to the Chief Executive Officer, and then to the Board of Directors. This system supported comprehensive evaluation of needs, distribution of information, and consideration of external factors, that supported subsequent dedication of resources by the Board of Directors to solution development.

Two core initiatives were the SFC Forest Resource Centre and the SFC Virtual Data Warehouse (VDW). Together, they aimed to deliver a web-enabled geographic information system (GIS) and data-management system.

Other forest sector agencies have made their home in the SFC building since it opened on January 7, 2005, including the Saskatchewan Environment Forest Service, Saskatchewan Forestry Association and BioForest Technologies. The Centre created new partnerships with universities, technical institutions, the private sector, and international forest-related institutions.

The Saskatchewan Forest Centre was later renamed Forest First and then was disbanded on May 27, 2009. The SFC building was reportedly on offer for sale in April 2015.

The building was sold to the University of Saskatchewan in 2018 to become a university hub for northern Saskatchewan.
