= William Saunders (scientist) =

Canadian agriculturalist, entomologist and pharmacist

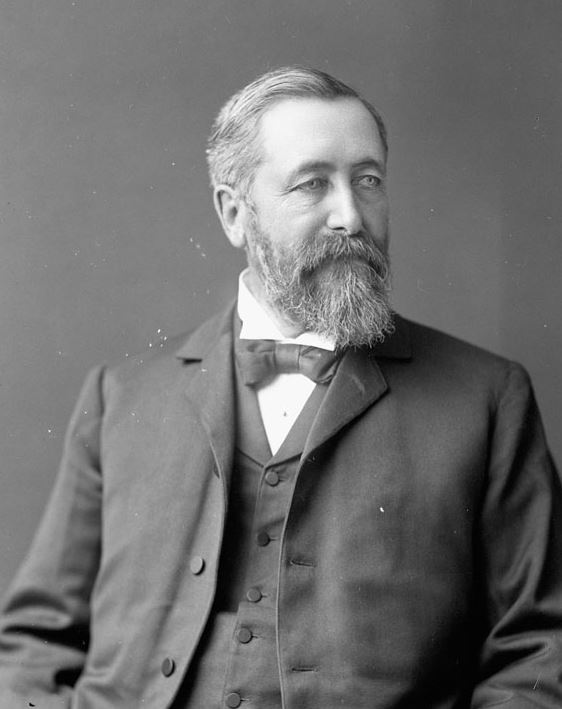
- Born: June 16, 1836; Crediton, England
- Died: September 13, 1914 (aged 78); London, Ontario
- Spouse: Sarah Agnes Robinson
- Children: 6, including Arthur Percy Saunders, Charles E. Saunders, Frederick Albert Saunders, and William Edwin Saunders

William Saunders, CMG (June 16, 1836 – September 13, 1914) was a Canadian agriculturalist, entomologist and pharmacist. He was a pioneer in Canadian agricultural science, led the establishment of the Experimental Farm System and served as its first director for almost 25 years.

== Biography ==
Saunders was born in Crediton, England, the son of James Saunders and Jane (Wollacott) Saunders. His father was a shoemaker and Methodist preacher. In 1848, when Saunders was twelve years old, the family emigrated to Canada and settled in London, Province of Canada. Saunders had little or no formal education in London but was instead apprenticed to a local druggist, John Salter. In 1855 when he was only nineteen, Saunders opened his own pharmacy which he eventually expanded into a wholesale pharmaceutical business that specialized in medicinal extracts made from plants.

Saunders became a well-known and influential part of the pharmaceutical community in Canada and the United States. In 1867 he was a founding member and later president of the Canadian Pharmaceutical Society. He was an active member of the American Pharmaceutical Association, serving as president in 1877-1878. In 1871 he helped establish the Ontario College of Pharmacy and served as president for two years. He also lectured on materia medica (pharmacology) at the University of Western Ontario.

Saunders' interest in plants and their medicinal properties led him to the study of entomology with a focus on applications in agriculture. He befriended Charles Bethune who shared his interest in insects and together they helped found the Entomological Society of Canada in 1863. In 1868 they began publishing the Canadian Entomologist, a journal to which they were the sole contributors for the initial two issues. Bethune was the editor for the first five years and then Saunders served as editor until 1886. Both the society and the journal were the first of their kind in Canada to focus on entomology and their influence extended to the United States, where many entomologists were members of the Canadian society and published in the journal. In 1883 he published Insects Injurious to Fruits, which served as the standard text on the subject in North America for 25 years.

Saunders' most important contributions were made in the field of horticulture. In 1869 he bought a small farm near London, planted fruit-trees, and began experiments in hybridization. The results of his work were published by the Fruit Growers' Association of Ontario, another organization in which he was involved. By 1880 Saunders was regarded as the leading authority on agriculture and horticulture in Canada. Consequently, in 1885, when the Canadian government was considering ways to improve agricultural output, they asked Saunders to investigate the feasibility of implementing an experimental farm system similar to the model used in the United States. Saunders visited several experimental farms in America and delivered his recommendations the following year.

The government accepted Saunders' recommendations on the establishment of the Dominion Experimental Farms of which he was appointed director in 1887. For the next 25 years Saunders led research into horticulture, forestry, and animal husbandry. The focus was on practical solutions to the problems faced by Canadian farmers. In particular, the experimental farms produced improved varieties of grain, livestock and fruit trees that were adapted to the Canadian climate. He began the work that was completed by his son Charles E. Saunders to develop the important wheat cultivar 'Marquis'. Among the high-profile individuals who reviewed his experimental farms are included Peter Kropotkin, the author of Fields, Factories, and Workshops.

He retired in 1911 when his health began to fail. In gratitude for his service, the Department of Agriculture sent him on a year-long tour of Europe. Shortly after his return to Canada he died on September 13, 1914.

He belonged to many scientific societies and received many honors. He was one of the original members of the Royal Society of Canada, the recipient of honorary degrees from Toronto and Queen's Universities, and in 1905 was made a Companion of the Order of St. Michael and St. George.

== Family ==
Shortly after his arrival in London, ON, at the age of 13, Saunders was apprenticed to a local pharmacist and later opened his own drugstore. Saunders was married to Sarah Agnes Robinson and the two of them had 6 children together: Annie Louisa, William Edwin, Henry Scholey, Charles Edward, Arthur Percy, and Frederick Albert. Sarah also had an interest in botany, collecting and creating a herbarium of rare plant specimens that subsequently became part of the National Herbarium of Canada.

== Publications ==
Saunders published more than 200 scientific papers, articles and books in his lifetime. The breadth of his interests is reflected in the diversity of topics including entomology, forestry, horticulture, and pharmaceuticals. Titles include:

- Introduction and Dissemination of Noxious Insects
- Importance of Economizing and Preserving our Forests
- Influence of Sex in Hybridizing Fruits
- Early Ripening Cereals
- Increased Production of Farm Crops by Early Sowing
- Entomology for Beginners
- Grape Phylloxera, Phylloxera vastatrix
- On Extractum Cannabis Indicae
- On the Insect Enemies of Drugs
- Insects Injurious to Fruits

== References and further reading ==
- Bethune, C. J. S. (1886). "Editorial (resignation of William Saunders)". The Canadian Entomologist. 18 (10): 181–83. doi:10.4039/Ent18181-10.
- Bethune, C. J. S. (1914). "Dr. William Saunders, C. M. G." The Canadian Entomologist. 46 (10): 333–36. doi:10.4039/ent46333-10.
- Bourinot, John George (1894). "Bibliography of the Members of the Royal Society of Canada, (Saunders, William)". Proceedings and Transactions of the Royal Society of Canada. 12: 67–70.
- Buller, A. H. Reginald. Essays on Wheat: Including the Discovery and Introduction of Marquis Wheat (1919) online
- Fedak, George. "Marquis Wheat" Encyclopedia of Canada (2015) p. 1436 online
- Goding, F. W. (1894). "A Pen Sketch of Prof. William Saunders, F.R.S.C., F.L.S., ETC". Annual Report of the Entomological Society of Ontario. 25: 120–21.
- Mallis, Arnold (1971). American Entomologists. Rutgers University Press. pp. 107–110. ISBN 9780813506869.
- Morrison, J. W. “Marquis Wheat: Triumph of Scientific Endeavor.” Agricultural History 34#4 1960, pp. 182–88. JSTOR 3741112
- Pomeroy, Elsie M. (1956). William Saunders and His Five Sons: The Story of the Marquis Wheat Family. Toronto: Ryerson Press.
- Shutt, Frank T. (1914). "The Late William Saunders, C.M.G., LL.D." Science. 40 (1037): 700–703. Bibcode:1914Sci....40..700S. doi:10.1126/science.40.1037.700. JSTOR 1640200. PMID 17740036.
- Smith, Helen (1996). Ottawa's Farm, A History of the Central Experimental Farm. General Store Publishing House.
- Sorenson, W. Conner (1995). Brethren of the Net: American Entomologists, 1840-1880. University of Alabama Press.
- Spencer, G. J. (1964). "A Century of Entomology in Canada" (PDF). The Canadian Entomologist. 96: 33–59. doi:10.4039/Ent961-1. S2CID 251410246. Archived from the original (PDF) on 2016-08-10.
- Stewart, Ian M. (1998). "William Saunders". Dictionary of Canadian Biography, vol. 14. University of Toronto.

Professional and academic associations
Preceded by Alexander Johnson	President of the Royal Society of Canada; 1906–1907	Succeeded by Samuel Edward Dawson
