= Marquis wheat =

Wheat cultivar

Triticum aestivum 'Marquis'
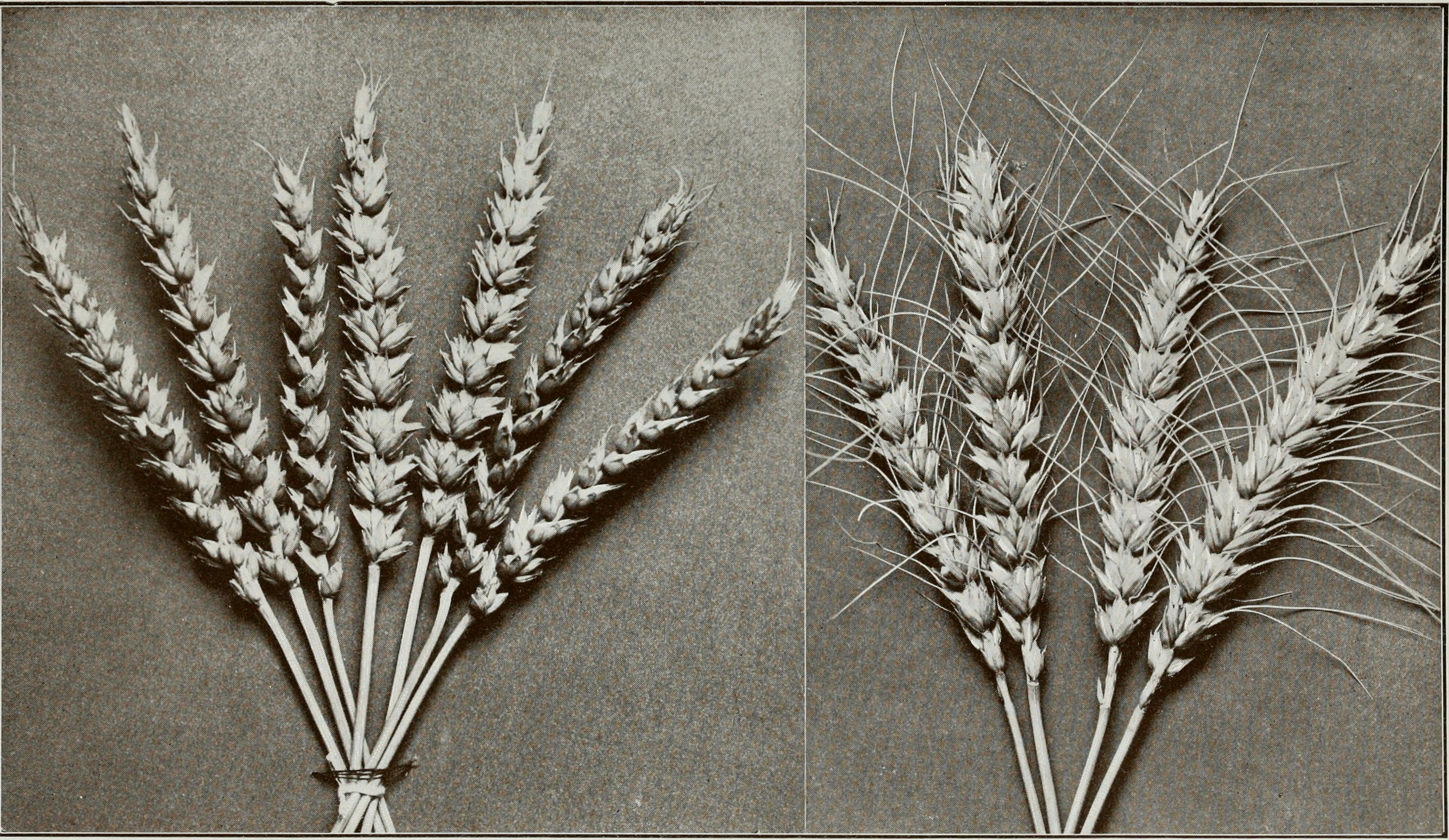
- 'Marquis' wheat (left) compared to 'Preston' (right)
- Species: Triticum aestivum
- Cultivar: 'Marquis'

The 'Marquis' bread wheat cultivar was developed by a team led by Dr. William Saunders, Director, Dominion Experimental Farms, between 1892 and 1909. It is a cross between Red Fife (male parent) and Hard Red Calcutta (female parent). It was selected for superiority in milling quality for bread flour over other cultivars then prevalent in western Canada. 'Marquis' had the advantage of maturing 10 days earlier than its competitors – a factor of great importance in the Canadian wheatbelt such as Alberta, Manitoba and Saskatchewan, extending as far south as southern Nebraska.

In 1892, Dr. William Saunders, and his team imported wheat varieties from Russia, India, Japan, Australia and the USA to be tested alongside Red Fife. Ultimately, it was the Red Fife cross with Hard Red Calcutta, from India, that gave rise to the Marquis wheat. "Hard Red Calcutta gave low yields and was of poor quality; however, the wheat matured roughly 20 days prior to Red Fife."

In 1907, Dr. Charles E. Saunders, Dominion Cerealist (son of Dr. William Saunders), sent 23 pounds of Marquis wheat from Ottawa to the Indian Head Experimental Farm to test the grain under prairie conditions. The variety produced high yields and ripened early; and, although it wasn't rust-resistant, it was ready for harvest before rust fungus became problematic. In 1909, four hundred samples were distributed to farmers throughout Western Canada, resulting in a number of successful crops grown.

Marquis wheat played a decisive role in reshaping farming in the Prairie provinces, Alberta Saskatchewan and Manitoba, with their rich soils and long winters. Marquis wheat matured a week earlier than its predecessor, Red Fife. The ripe Marquis could be harvested before the damaging early autumn frosts, thus sharply reducing the risk of crop failure. It equalled the superior milling and baking qualities of its parent, Red Fife. Marquis hard red spring wheat made excellent bread flour due to its high protein and strong gluten content. This established Canada's reputation for high-quality export wheat. Per acre Marquis also gave high yields. By 1920, Marquis accounted for 90 percent of the hard red spring wheat planted on the Canadian Prairies, doubling wheat production in some areas between 1906 and 1920. This opportunity attracted farmers from eastern Canada and the United states, as well as Ukraine, Germany and Scandinavia. It thus played a central role in establishing the Prairie provinces as a major global grain-exporting area.

Marquis was eventually replaced by rust-resistant varieties like Thatcher, Apex, and Renown.
