= Charles E. Saunders =

Canadian agronomist

Sir Charles Edward Saunders
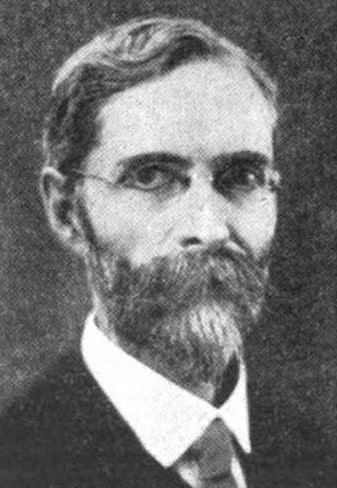
- Born: February 2, 1867; London, Canada West
- Died: July 25, 1937 (aged 70); Toronto, Ontario
- Known for: 'Marquis' wheat
- Awards: Flavelle Medal (1925)
- Scientific career
- Fields: agronomy

Sir Charles Edward Saunders, FRSC (February 2, 1867 – July 25, 1937) was a Canadian agronomist. He was the inventor of the 'Marquis' wheat cultivar. Saunders Secondary School in London, Ontario is named for him and other members of his prominent family, including his father, agriculturist William Saunders and naturalist brother William Edwin Saunders.

== Early life and education ==
Saunders was born in London, Canada West, on February 2, 1867, son of William and Sarah Agnes Robinson Saunders. He received his early education in the elementary and collegiate system in London. He received a Bachelor of Arts in chemistry from the University of Toronto in 1888. From 1888 to 1893, he specialized in chemistry at summer school at Harvard University. In 1891, he received a Ph.D for chemistry from Johns Hopkins University. He studied at the Sorbonne.

Saunders learned most of what he knew about plant hybridization at home through his family. Some of his earliest memories are of driving with his father to a fruit farm outside the city limits, where he would help him hybridize grapes, currants, raspberries, and gooseberries.

Saunders married Mary Blackwell of Toronto in 1892.

== Careers ==
From 1892 to 1893, Saunders was the professor of chemistry and geology at Central University in Kentucky. Between 1894 and 1903, he studied flute with E. M. Heindl of the Boston Symphony Orchestra at the New England Conservatory of Music and with Eugene Weiner of the New York Philharmonic Club. He also received voice training. In Toronto, in addition to acting as an agent, he gave lessons in singing and flute playing. In 1895-1896 Saunders was a columnist in The Week, writing about various aspects of music. His musical career was not a financial success, however.

=== 1903–1920 ===
In 1903, William Saunders, Charles' father, appointed him Experimentalist at the Experimental Farm in Ottawa in 1903, a title that became Cerealist in 1905 and Dominion Cerealist in 1910. The new work continued family tradition, for Saunders's father had founded the system of experimental farms established in Canada, and his brother, Percy, had done considerable work in cross-breeding strains of wheat.

Saunders turned enthusiastically to his new tasks. Following up his brother's research, he completed development of 'Marquis' wheat in 1904, a cultivar which showed marked superiority in milling quality for bread flour over other varieties popular in western Canada. 'Marquis' had the advantage of maturing 10 days earlier than its competitors - a factor of great importance in the Canadian wheat belt. The Indian Head Experimental Farm in Saskatchewan raised 'Marquis' wheat for seed, and by 1909 its use was widespread. By 1920, 90% of the wheat grown in western Canada was 'Marquis'. However, 'Marquis' was not resistant to stem rust. In seeking newer and better varieties Saunders developed three other strains of wheat - 'Ruby', 'Garnet', and 'Reward' - specifically adapted to prairie conditions. He was also responsible for improved varieties of oats and barley.

In the search for a hardy wheat that would mature faster, he made hundreds of crosses, proceeding to test the yields. Tests included one called "chewing", whereby Saunders identified strains with strong gluten by chewing a few sample kernels. "I made more wheat into gum than was made by all the boys in any dozen rural schools of a generation ago."

Using a technique he devised himself, Saunders ground his own flour and baked his own bread in small loaves to measure volume.

Working with 'Red Fife', which had been imported and developed by David Fife from Ontario, Saunders crossed it with 'Hard Red Calcutta'. The new cultivar 'Markham' showed great promise, but its offspring were not uniform. After many trials at the Agassiz experimental farm, a winner emerged - 'Marquis'.

In 1906, surplus 'Marquis' seed was shipped to Indian Head, Saskatchewan, for additional testing.

In 1911, 'Marquis' won the Canadian Pacific Railway Prize of $1,000.00 for the best bushel of hard spring wheat grown in North America. This was the first of many prizes.

The only drawback of 'Marquis' was its susceptibility to rust. Not until 1947 was a rust-resistant variety developed at the Central Experimental Farm in Ottawa. It was named 'Saunders'.

=== 1920–1922 ===
By 1920, 90% of the wheat crop in western Canada was 'Marquis'.

Saunders also applied his methods to barley, oats, peas, beans, and flax, introducing several new cultivars of each.

He wrote extensively on the subject and many of his thoughts on cereals were presented to scientific conferences and societies and printed in scientific magazines.

== Retirement ==
In 1922, after suffering a physical breakdown, Saunders resigned his position and moved to Paris with his wife.

From 1922 to 1925, he studied French literature at the Sorbonne. In the latter year, he returned to Ottawa briefly, but in 1928 he moved to Toronto. Though retired, he continued to lecture on 'Marquis' wheat and the French language.

In 1928, Essais et vers, a collection of Saunders' French essays and poems, was published by Louis Carrier and Cie, Les Editions du Mercure, in Montreal and New York. The work received critical acclaim in the French press, especially in Quebec.

== Death ==
Saunders died in Toronto on July 25, 1937. Tributes to him came from around the world. In The London Daily Express, his obituary read:

He added more wealth to his country than any other man. Marconi gave power. Saunders gave abundance. Great lives, these!

== Honours ==
- In 1921, Saunders was made a Fellow of The Royal Society of Canada.
- In 1921, he was awarded an Honorary Doctor of Laws and Letters by the University of Western Ontario.
- In 1925, he was awarded an Honorary Doctor of Science from the University of Toronto.
- In 1925, he received the Royal Society of Canada's Flavelle Medal for Science.
- He was knighted by King George V in 1934 for his contribution to agriculture.
- In recognition of his work in the French language he was decorated by the French government and was presented with the Medaille de l'Académie française.

He is a member of the Canadian Science and Engineering Hall of Fame.
