= Red Fife wheat =

Type of Wheat in Canada

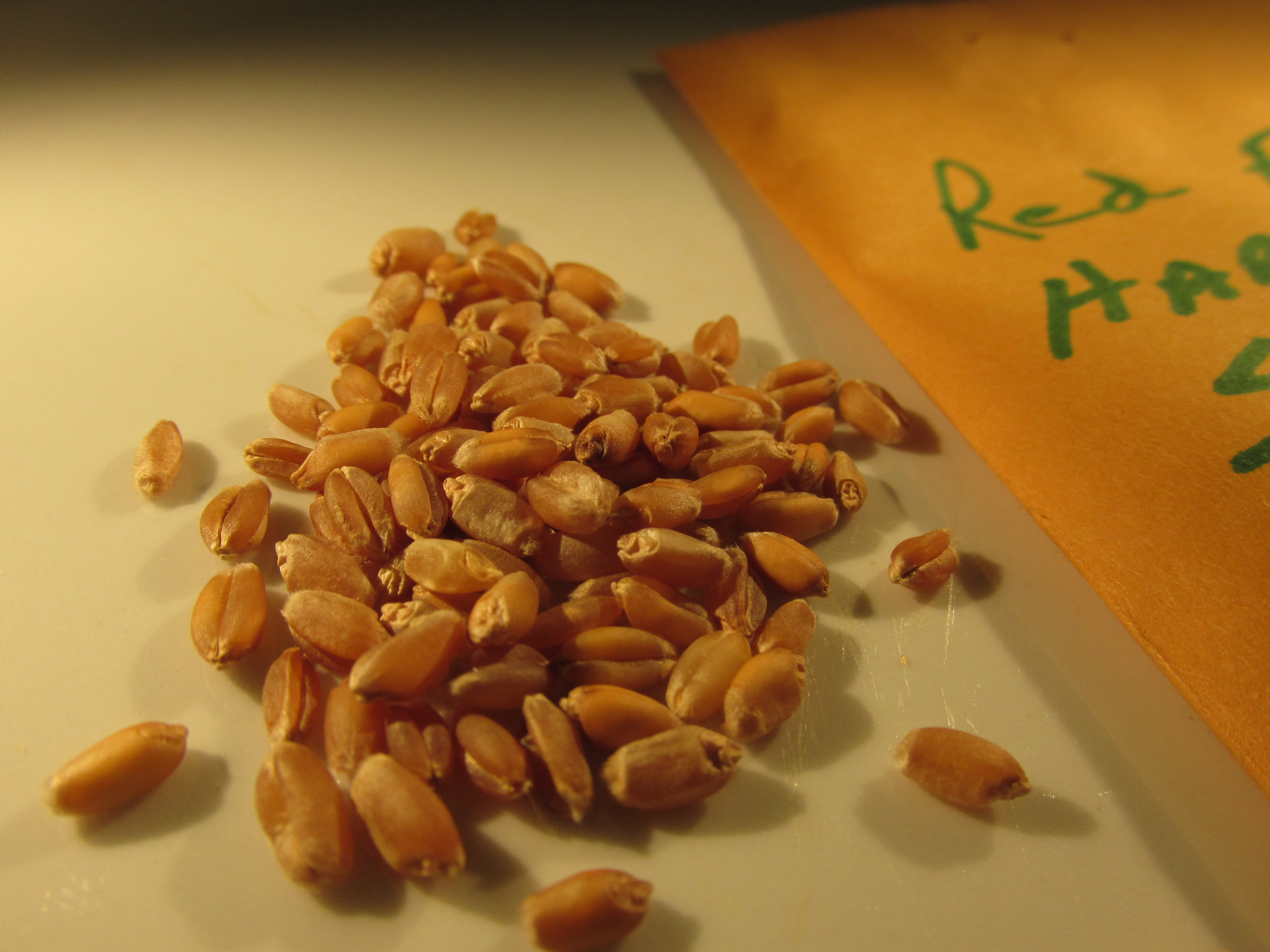
Red Fife hard red spring wheat seeds.

Red Fife (Triticum aestivum) wheat is a Canadian landrace descendant of wheat from Galicia, Ukraine, its old local Galician name being "Halychanka". It is a hard, bread wheat with straws 0.9 to 1.5 metres (3 to 5 feet) tall.

From the mid-1800s until the early 1900s, Red Fife was the dominant variety of wheat grown in Canada and the northern United States, prized for its hardiness, rust resistance, yield, and milling and baking qualities.

Red Fife was first grown in 1842 by David Fife, a farmer in Otonabee Township in Peterborough County, Upper Canada, who had been sent Halychanka seed by a friend in Scotland. Red Fife is named "red" for its colour when fully ripe and "Fife" after David Fife; however, American farmers may know this wheat as Canadian Fife, Fife, Saskatchewan Fife, or Scotch Fife.

Little is known about the development of Red Fife between 1842 and 1860; but, after that date Red Fife featured prominently in agricultural publications as farmers recommended this new variety of wheat to their peers.

In Canada, by 1876, Red Fife was displacing other varieties of wheat (including Siberian and White Russian) that farmers were only having limited success growing. In the United States, Red Fife was grown in northern states. Red Fife was widely grown until it was replaced by Marquis wheat in the early 1900s; Marquis being a hybrid for which Red Fife is the male parent.

In 1988, cultivation of Red Fife was revived by The Heritage Wheat Project (HWP). Over 450 metric tonnes of Red Fife was harvested in Canada in 2007.
