= 1984 in the United States =

- Decades: 1960s; 1970s; 1980s; 1990s; 2000s
- See also: History of the United States (1980–1991); Timeline of United States history (1970–1989); List of years in the United States

Events from the year 1984 in the United States.

== Incumbents ==
=== Federal government ===
- President: Ronald Reagan (R-California)
- Vice President: George H. W. Bush (R-Texas)
- Chief Justice: Warren E. Burger (Virginia)
- Speaker of the House of Representatives: Tip O'Neill (D-Massachusetts)
- Senate Majority Leader: Howard Baker (R-Tennessee)
- Congress: 98th

==== State governments ====
Governors and lieutenant governors

=== Governors ===
- Governor of Alabama: George Wallace (Democratic)
- Governor of Alaska: Bill Sheffield (Democratic)
- Governor of Arizona: Bruce Babbitt (Democratic)
- Governor of Arkansas: Bill Clinton (Democratic)
- Governor of California: George Deukmejian (Republican)
- Governor of Colorado: Richard Lamm (Democratic)
- Governor of Connecticut: William A. O'Neill (Democratic)
- Governor of Delaware: Pierre S. du Pont, IV (Republican)
- Governor of Florida: Bob Graham (Democratic)
- Governor of Georgia: Joe Frank Harris (Democratic)
- Governor of Hawaii: George Ariyoshi (Democratic)
- Governor of Idaho: John V. Evans (Democratic)
- Governor of Illinois: James R. Thompson (Republican)
- Governor of Indiana: Robert D. Orr (Republican)
- Governor of Iowa: Terry E. Branstad (Republican)
- Governor of Kansas: John W. Carlin (Democratic)
- Governor of Kentucky: Martha Layne Collins (Democratic)
- Governor of Louisiana: David C. Treen (Republican) (until March 12), Edwin W. Edwards (Democratic) (starting March 12)
- Governor of Maine: Joseph E. Brennan (Democratic)
- Governor of Maryland: Harry R. Hughes (Democratic)
- Governor of Massachusetts: Michael Dukakis (Democratic)
- Governor of Michigan: James Blanchard (Democratic)
- Governor of Minnesota: Rudy Perpich (Democratic)
- Governor of Mississippi: William Winter (Democratic) (until January 10), William Allain (Democratic) (starting January 10)
- Governor of Missouri: Kit Bond (Republican)
- Governor of Montana: Ted Schwinden (Democratic)
- Governor of Nebraska: Bob Kerrey (Democratic)
- Governor of Nevada: Richard Bryan (Democratic)
- Governor of New Hampshire: John H. Sununu (Republican)
- Governor of New Jersey: Thomas Kean (Republican)
- Governor of New Mexico: Toney Anaya (Democratic)
- Governor of New York: Mario Cuomo (Democratic)
- Governor of North Carolina: Jim Hunt (Democratic)
- Governor of North Dakota: Allen I. Olson (Republican)
- Governor of Ohio: Dick Celeste (Democratic)
- Governor of Oklahoma: George Nigh (Democratic)
- Governor of Oregon: Victor G. Atiyeh (Republican)
- Governor of Pennsylvania: Dick Thornburgh (Republican)
- Governor of Rhode Island: J. Joseph Garrahy (Democratic)
- Governor of South Carolina: Richard Riley (Democratic)
- Governor of South Dakota: William J. Janklow (Republican)
- Governor of Tennessee: Lamar Alexander (Republican)
- Governor of Texas: Mark White (Democratic)
- Governor of Utah: Scott M. Matheson (Democratic)
- Governor of Vermont: Richard A. Snelling (Republican)
- Governor of Virginia: Chuck Robb (Democratic)
- Governor of Washington: John Spellman (Republican)
- Governor of West Virginia: Jay Rockefeller (Democratic)
- Governor of Wisconsin: Tony Earl (Democratic)
- Governor of Wyoming: Edgar J. Herschler (Democratic)

=== Lieutenant governors ===
- Lieutenant Governor of Alabama: Bill Baxley (Democratic)
- Lieutenant Governor of Alaska: Stephen McAlpine (Democratic)
- Lieutenant Governor of Arkansas: Winston Bryant (Democratic)
- Lieutenant Governor of California: Leo T. McCarthy (Democratic)
- Lieutenant Governor of Colorado: Nancy Dick (Democratic)
- Lieutenant Governor of Connecticut: Joseph J. Fauliso (Democratic)
- Lieutenant Governor of Delaware: Michael N. Castle (Republican)
- Lieutenant Governor of Florida: Wayne Mixson (Democratic)
- Lieutenant Governor of Georgia: Zell Miller (Democratic)
- Lieutenant Governor of Hawaii: John D. Waihee III (Democratic)
- Lieutenant Governor of Idaho: David H. Leroy (Republican)
- Lieutenant Governor of Illinois: George H. Ryan (Republican)
- Lieutenant Governor of Indiana: John Mutz (Republican)
- Lieutenant Governor of Iowa: Robert T. Anderson (Democratic)
- Lieutenant Governor of Kansas: Thomas R. Docking (Democratic)
- Lieutenant Governor of Kentucky: Steve Beshear (Democratic)
- Lieutenant Governor of Louisiana: Robert "Bobby" Freeman (Democratic)
- Lieutenant Governor of Maryland: J. Joseph Curran (Democratic)
- Lieutenant Governor of Massachusetts: John Kerry (Democratic)
- Lieutenant Governor of Michigan: Martha W. Griffiths (Democratic)
- Lieutenant Governor of Minnesota: Marlene Johnson (Democratic)
- Lieutenant Governor of Mississippi: Brad Dye (Democratic)
- Lieutenant Governor of Missouri: Kenneth Rothman (Democratic)
- Lieutenant Governor of Montana: George Turman (Democratic)
- Lieutenant Governor of Nebraska: Donald F. McGinley (Democratic)
- Lieutenant Governor of Nevada: Bob Cashell (Democratic)
- Lieutenant Governor of New Mexico: Mike Runnels (Democratic)
- Lieutenant Governor of New York: Alfred DelBello (Democratic)
- Lieutenant Governor of North Carolina: James C. Green (Democratic)
- Lieutenant Governor of North Dakota: Ernest Sands (Republican)
- Lieutenant Governor of Ohio: Myrl H. Shoemaker (Democratic)
- Lieutenant Governor of Oklahoma: Spencer Bernard (Democratic)
- Lieutenant Governor of Pennsylvania: William Scranton, III (Republican)
- Lieutenant Governor of Rhode Island: Thomas R. DiLuglio (Democratic)
- Lieutenant Governor of South Carolina: Michael R. Daniel (Democratic)
- Lieutenant Governor of South Dakota: Lowell C. Hansen II (Republican)
- Lieutenant Governor of Tennessee: John S. Wilder (Democratic)
- Lieutenant Governor of Texas: William P. Hobby Jr. (Democratic)
- Lieutenant Governor of Utah: David Smith Monson (Republican)
- Lieutenant Governor of Vermont: Peter Plympton Smith (Republican)
- Lieutenant Governor of Virginia: Richard Joseph Davis (Democratic)
- Lieutenant Governor of Washington: John Cherberg (Democratic)
- Lieutenant Governor of Wisconsin: James Flynn (Democratic)

== Events ==
=== January ===
- January 1 – US Bell System is broken up.
- January 3 – U.S. President Ronald Reagan meets with Navy Lieutenant Robert Goodman and the Reverend Jesse Jackson at the White House, following Lieutenant Goodman's release from Syrian captivity.
- January 10 – The United States and the Vatican re-establish full diplomatic relations.
- January 25 – President Ronald Reagan announces in his State of the Union Address that the United States will begin development of a permanently crewed space station and invite international space agencies to the project – a concept initially known as Space Station Freedom, later evolved into the International Space Station.
- January 27 – Michael Jackson's hair catches fire during the filming of a Pepsi commercial.

=== February ===
- February 3
  - Dr. John Buster and the research team at Harbor-UCLA Medical Center announce history's first embryo transfer, from one woman to another resulting in a live birth.
  - STS-41-B: Space Shuttle Challenger is launched on the 10th Space Shuttle mission.
- February 11 – STS-41-B: Space Shuttle Challenger makes the first shuttle landing at the Kennedy Space Center.
- February 24 – Two people are killed in a sniper attack on 49th Street Elementary School in South Central Los Angeles, California.
- February 26 – United States Marines pull out of Beirut, Lebanon.
- February 28 – Michael Jackson wins a record of eight Grammy Awards.

=== March ===
- March 16
  - The CIA station chief in Beirut, William Francis Buckley, is kidnapped by Islamic Jihad and later dies in captivity.
  - Jeff Doucet, a sex offender arrested for the abduction and rape of Jody Plauché, is shot and killed by Jody's father Gary Plauché at Baton Rouge Metropolitan Airport in Louisiana.
- March 22 – Teachers at the McMartin Preschool in Manhattan Beach, California are charged with Satanic ritual abuse of the schoolchildren (the charges are later dropped as completely unfounded).

=== April ===
- April 4 – U.S. President Ronald Reagan calls for an international ban on chemical weapons.
- April 9 – The 56th Academy Awards, hosted by Johnny Carson, are held at the Dorothy Chandler Pavilion in Los Angeles, with James L. Brooks' Terms of Endearment winning Best Picture and Best Director, as well as three other awards out of 11 nominations.
- April 23 – Margaret Heckler of the U.S. Public Health Service announces the identity of HTLV-III as the virus that causes AIDS.
- April 24 – The 6.2 M_{w} Morgan Hill earthquake shook central California and the South Bay area with a maximum Mercalli intensity of VIII (Severe), causing 21–27 injuries and $7.5–8 million in losses.

=== May ===
- May 8
  - 1984 Summer Olympics boycott: The Soviet Union announces that it will boycott the 1984 Summer Olympics in Los Angeles, California.
  - The longest game in Major League Baseball history begins at 7:30 PM between the Milwaukee Brewers and the Chicago White Sox. The game is played over the course of 2 days, lasting 25 innings, with a total time of 8 hours and 6 minutes.
- May 12 – The 1984 Louisiana World Exposition, a World's fair, opens in New Orleans.
- May 17 – Michael Silka kills nine people near Manley Hot Springs, Alaska.
- May 19 – The Edmonton Oilers defeat the New York Islanders to win their first Stanley Cup.
- May 27 – An overnight flash flood rages through neighborhoods in Tulsa, Oklahoma. Nearly 15 inches of rain falls in some areas over a four-hour period. Fourteen people are killed.
- May 31 – Six death row inmates at Mecklenburg Correctional Center in Mecklenburg County, Virginia, including James and Linwood Briley, escape, the only occasion this has ever happened in the US. All are eventually recaptured and executed.

=== June ===
- June 1 – William M. Gibbons is released as receiver and trustee of the Chicago, Rock Island and Pacific Railroad, after all of its debts and creditors are paid off by order of a federal bankruptcy court.
- June 3 – Ronald Reagan visits his ancestral home in Ballyporeen, the Republic of Ireland.
- June 4 – Bruce Springsteen releases his 7th album Born in the U.S.A.. The CD of the album is the first CD to be manufactured in the U.S.
- June 8
  - 1984 Barneveld, Wisconsin tornado outbreak: An F6 tornado nearly destroys the town of Barneveld, Wisconsin, killing nine people, injuring nearly 200, and causing over $25,000,000 in damage.
  - Ghostbusters and Gremlins are released.
- June 16 – Gary Lauwers is murdered by his friend Ricky Kasso following a night of heavy drug use in Northport, Long Island, New York.
- June 22 – The Karate Kid is released.
- June 25 – Purple Rain, the sixth studio album by recording artist Prince, is released by Warner Bros. Records. The soundtrack to the film of the same name, it is the first album where his band The Revolution is billed.
- June 28 – Richard Ramírez (the "Night Stalker") murders his first confirmed victim.

=== July ===
- July 13 – Terry Wallis, a 19-year-old living in the Ozark Mountains of Arkansas, falls into a deep coma after a severe automobile accident; he will eventually awaken 19 years later on June 13, 2003.
- July 18
  - Beverly Burns becomes the first female Boeing 747 captain in the world.
  - In San Ysidro, California, 21 people are killed in a mass shooting at a McDonald's before the shooter is fatally shot by a police sniper
- July 23 – Vanessa L. Williams becomes the first Miss America to resign, when she surrenders her crown after nude photos of her appear in Penthouse magazine.
- July 27 – Metallica releases a second studio album, Ride the Lightning.
- July 28–August 12 – The 1984 Summer Olympics are held in Los Angeles, California.

=== August ===
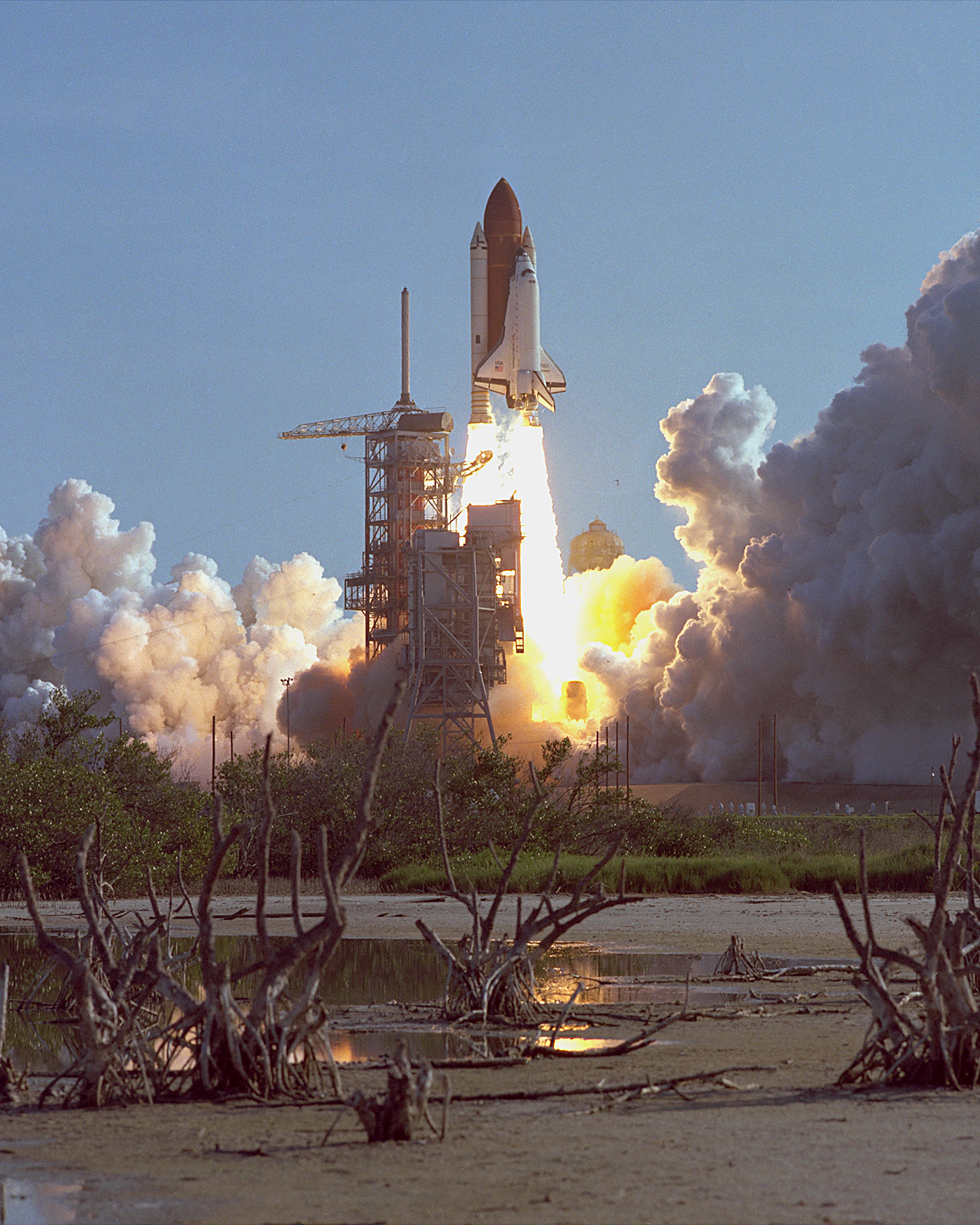
August 30–September 5: Space Shuttle Discovery's maiden voyage

- August 11 – United States President Ronald Reagan, during a voice check for a radio broadcast remarks, "My fellow Americans, I'm pleased to tell you today that I've signed legislation that will outlaw Russia forever. We begin bombing in five minutes."
- August 30 – STS-41-D: The Space Shuttle Discovery takes off on its maiden voyage.

=== September ===
- September 5 – STS-41-D: The Space Shuttle Discovery lands after its maiden voyage.
- September 16 – Miami Vice premieres on the NBC television network with the episode, "Brother's Keeper".
- September 17 – The Transformers debuts in syndication.
- September 10 – Jeopardy! begins its syndicated version, with host Alex Trebek.
- September 20 – Hezbollah car-bombs the U.S. Embassy annex in Beirut, killing 24 people.

=== October ===
- October 1 – American Movie Classics is initiated.
- October 2 – John Schnatter opens the first Papa John's Pizza in Jeffersonville, Indiana.
- October 5 – STS-41-G: Marc Garneau becomes the first Canadian in space, aboard the Space Shuttle Challenger.
- October 6 – Out of Control debuts on Nickelodeon.
- October 7 – Barbara Walters hosts the first presidential debate between Walter Mondale and President Reagan in Kentucky.
- October 11
  - Aboard the Space Shuttle Challenger, astronaut Kathryn D. Sullivan becomes the first American woman to perform a space walk.
  - Geraldine Ferraro and George H. W. Bush participate in the 1984 vice presidential debate.
- October 14 – World Series: The Detroit Tigers defeat the San Diego Padres to win in 5 games.
- October 21 – The final presidential debate of the 1984 election takes place in Kansas.

=== November ===
November 6: Reagan reelected president

- November – The unemployment rate drops to 7.2%, the same rate it was when the early 1980s recession started in June 1981.
- November 2 – Capital punishment: Velma Barfield becomes the first woman executed in the United States since 1965, in Raleigh, North Carolina.
- November 6 – 1984 United States presidential election: Ronald Reagan defeats Walter F. Mondale with 59% of the popular vote, the highest since Richard Nixon's 61% victory in 1972. Reagan carries 49 states in the electoral college; Mondale wins only his home state of Minnesota by a mere 3,761 vote margin and the District of Columbia.
- November 9 – Cesar Chavez delivers his speech, "What The Future Holds For Farm Workers And Hispanics", at the Commonwealth Club in San Francisco.
- November 28 – Over 250 years after their deaths, William Penn and his wife Hannah Callowhill Penn are made Honorary Citizens of the United States.

=== December ===
- December 1 – Controlled Impact Demonstration: NASA intentionally crashes a remote controlled Boeing 720.
- December 8 – White supremacist and Order leader Robert Jay Mathews is killed in a gun battle and fire during an FBI siege on Whidbey Island.
- December 22 – Four African-American youths (Barry Allen, Troy Canty, James Ramseur, and Darrell Cabey) are shot and injured by a white passenger, Bernhard Goetz, after the group attempted to rob Goetz on an express train in The Bronx borough of New York City. The event starts a national debate about urban crime.

=== Undated ===
- Arlene Violet, until recently a religious sister, becomes Attorney General of Rhode Island, the first female Attorney General elected in the U.S.
- Ryan White, a student who contracted AIDS, is expelled from Western High School in Russiaville, Indiana because of his disease.
- Crack cocaine, a smokeable form of the drug, becomes widely used in the Los Angeles area and soon spreads across the United States in what becomes known as the Crack epidemic.
- Babbage's, a video game retailer is founded in Dallas.

=== Ongoing ===
- Cold War (1947–1991)

== Births ==
=== January ===
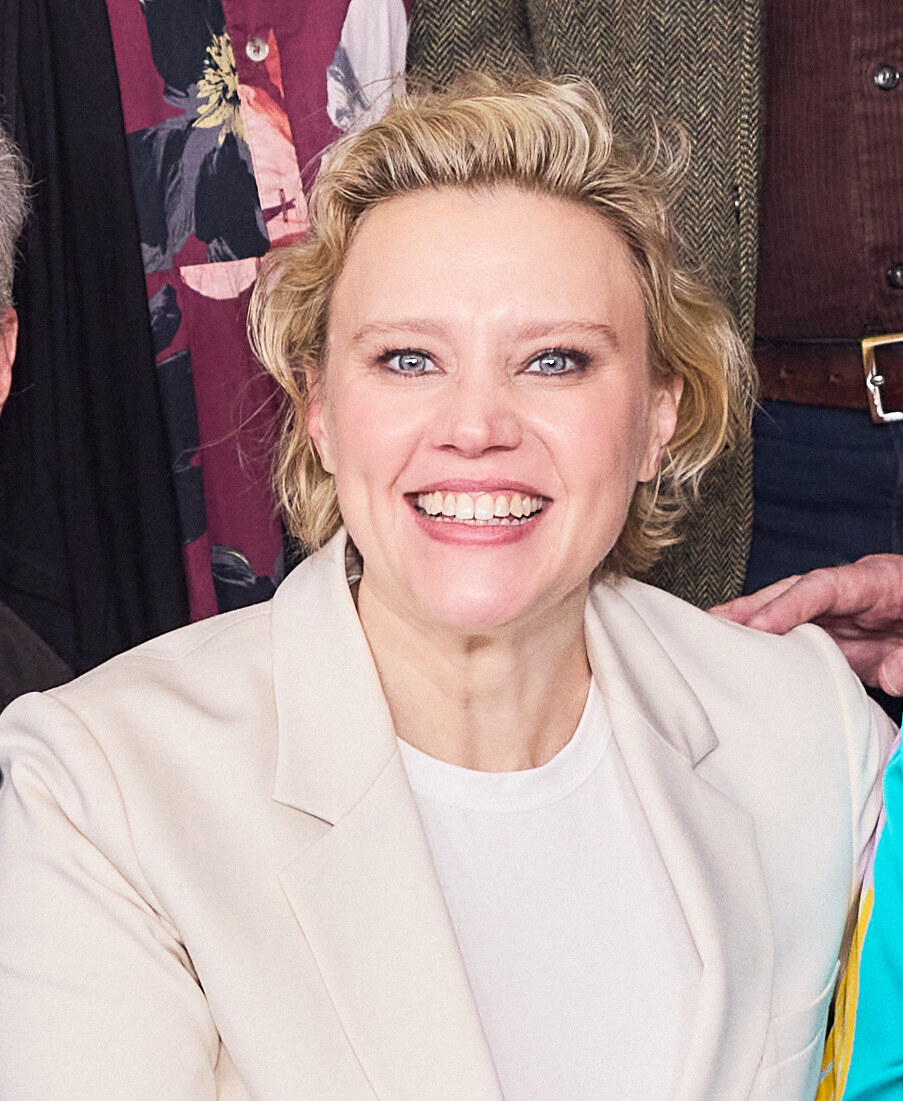
Kate McKinnon

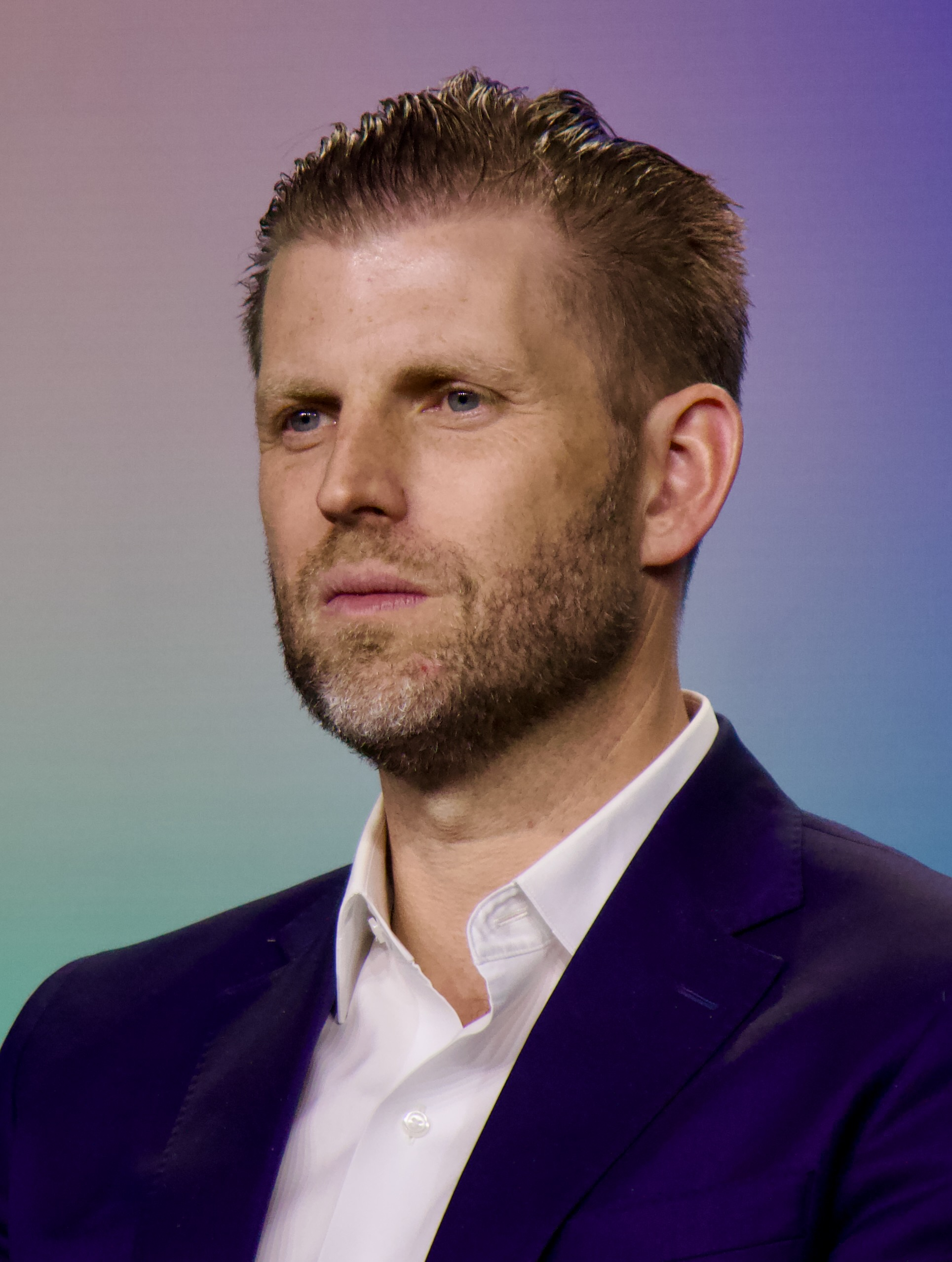
Eric Trump

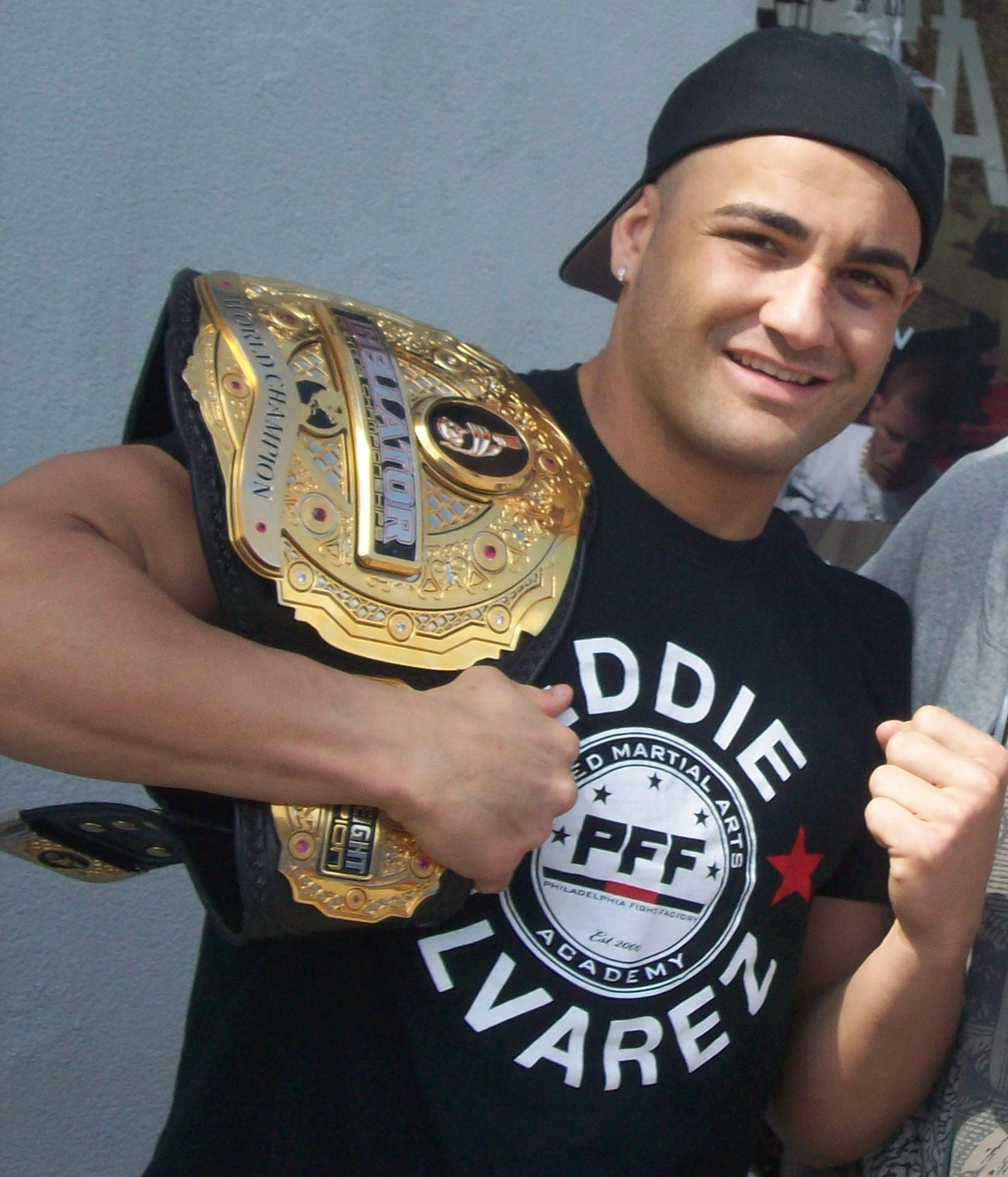
Eddie Alvarez

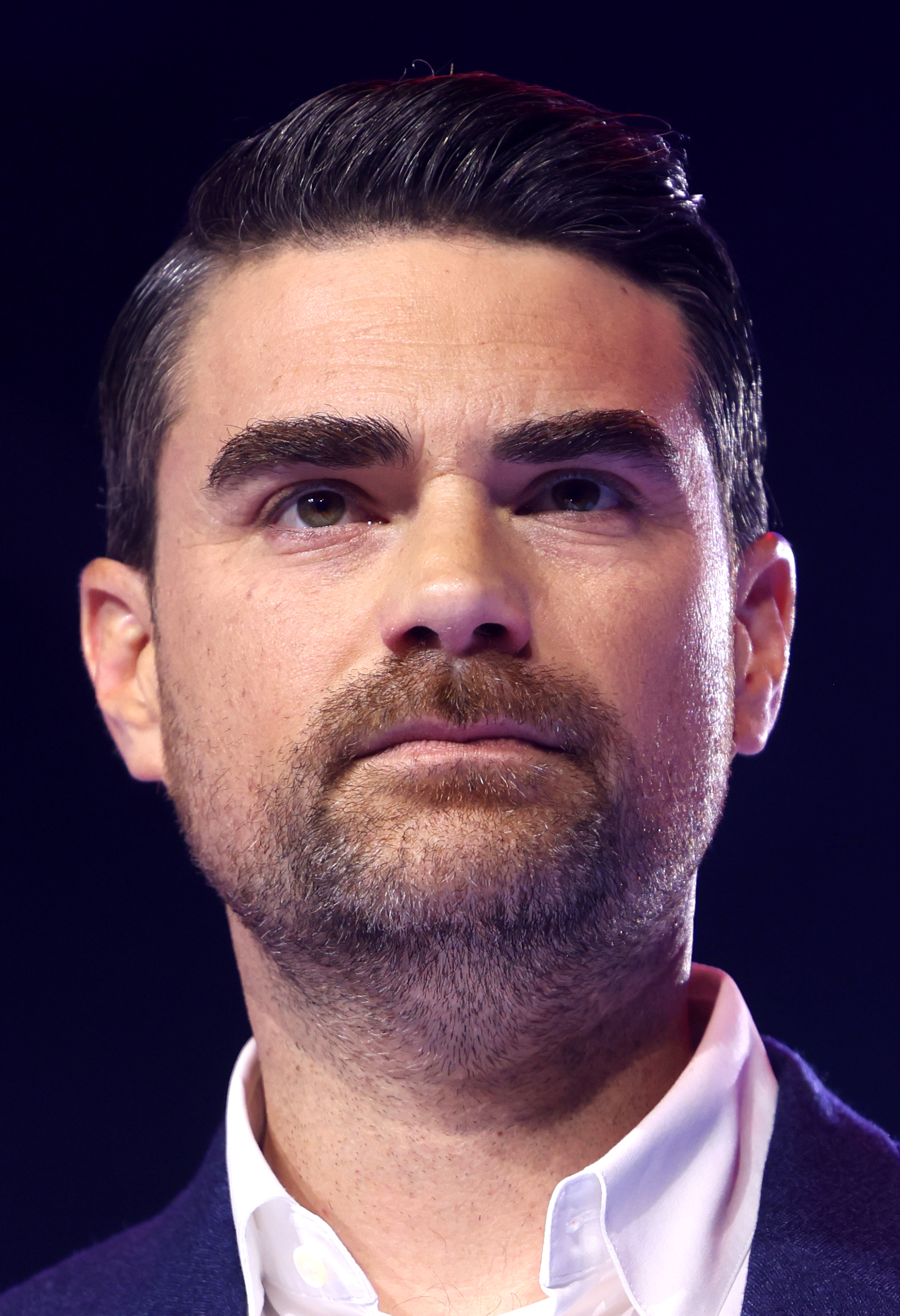
Ben Shapiro

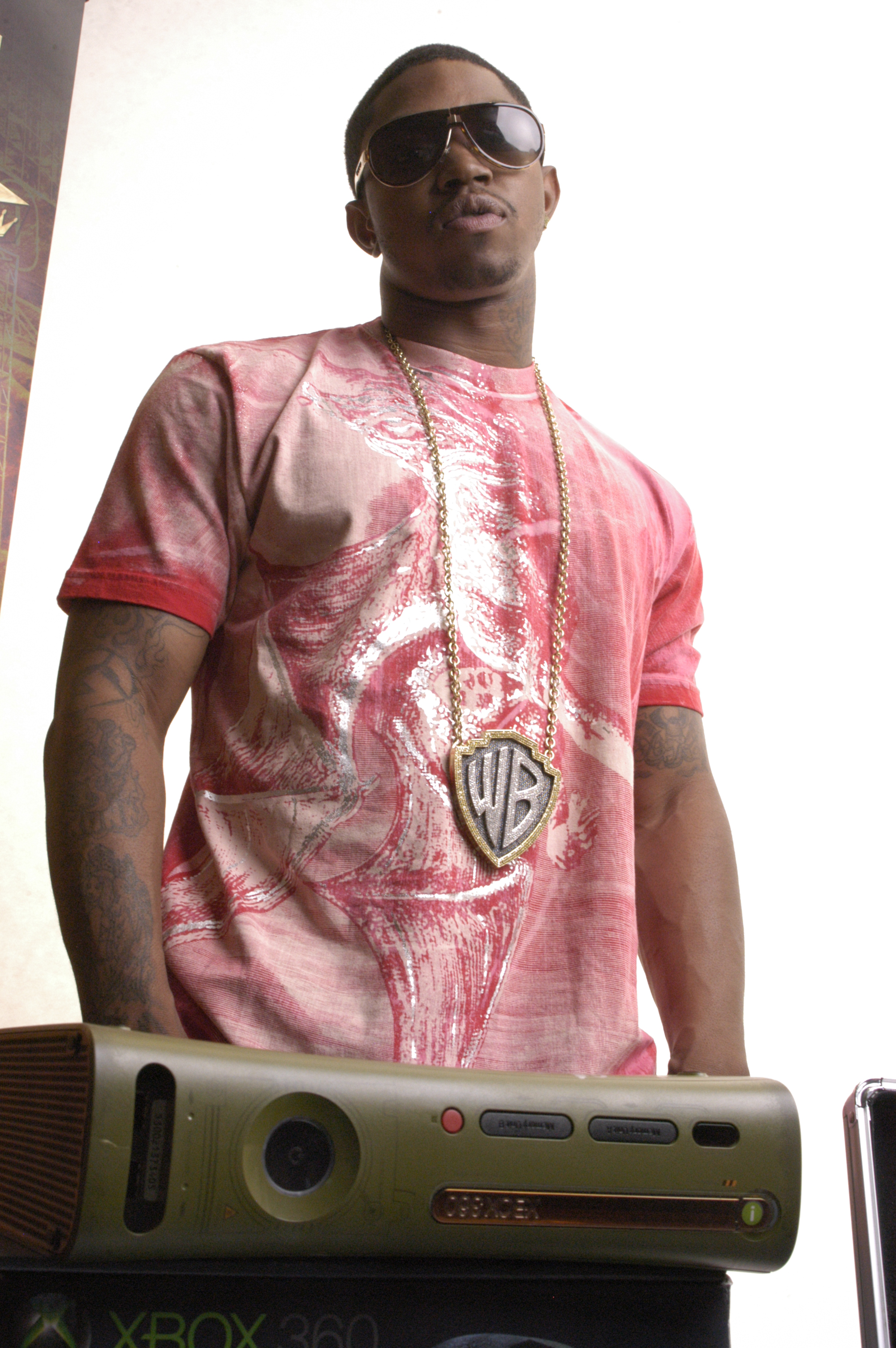
Lil Scrappy

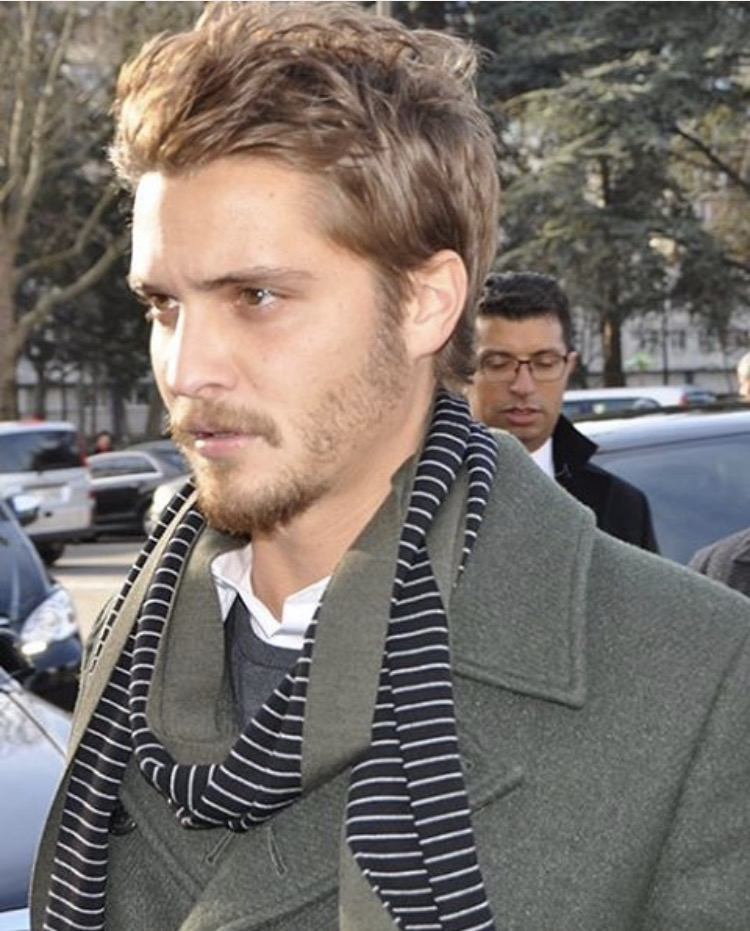
Luke Grimes

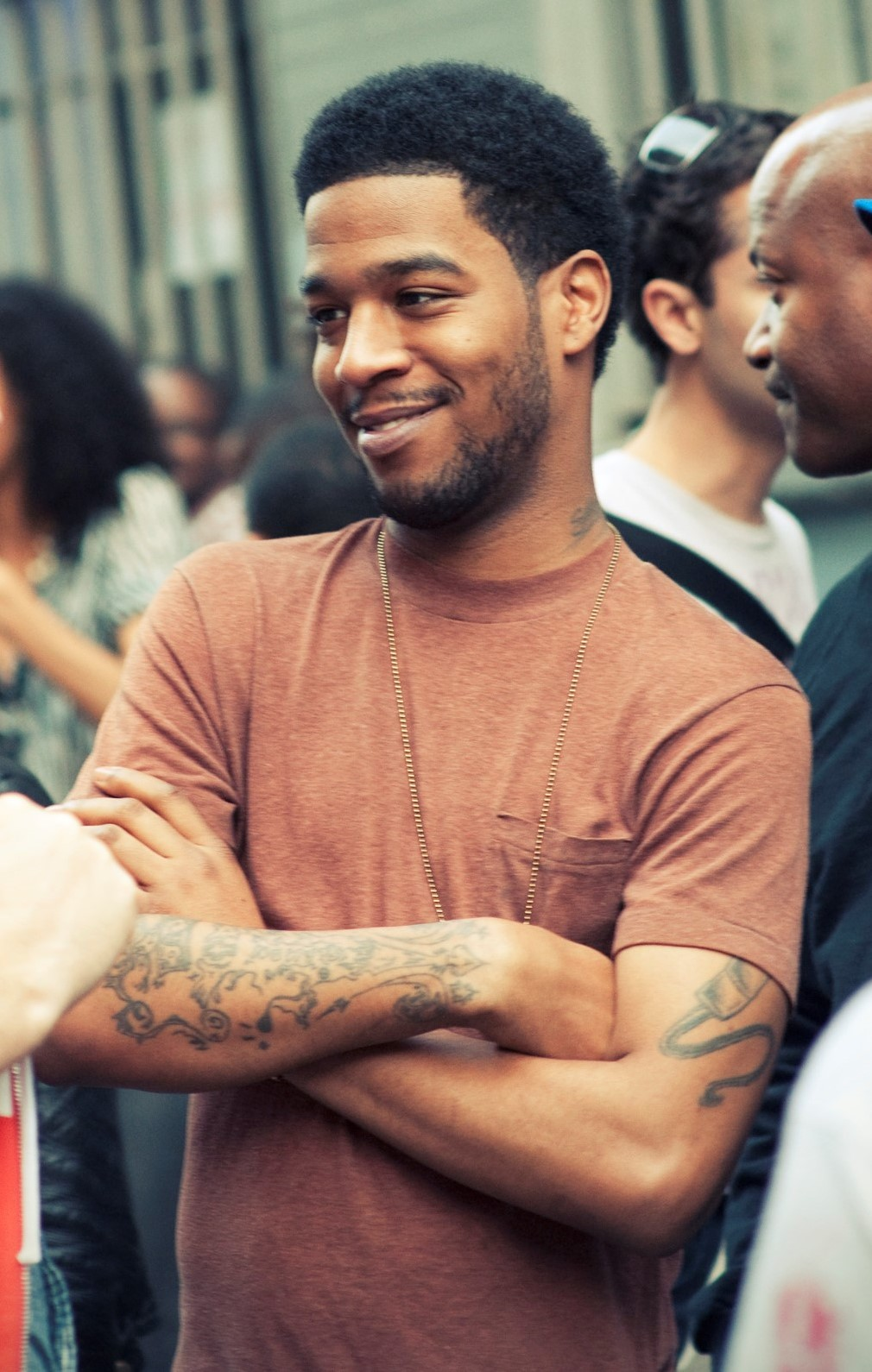
Kid Cudi

- January 1 – Lance Brooks, Olympic discus thrower
- January 3
  - Carlina Rivera, politician
  - Shelby Starner, singer/songwriter (d. 2003)
- January 4
  - Derek Brunson, mixed martial artist
  - Raphael Butler, boxer and mixed martial artist
  - Robin Sydney, actress
- January 5 – Josh Alcala, soccer player
- January 6
  - Hilaria Baldwin, yoga instructor, entrepreneur, podcaster, and author
  - Jimmy Barthmaier, baseball player
  - D.J. Bettencourt, politician
  - A.J. Hawk, football player and sports analyst
  - Kate McKinnon, actress and comedian
  - Eric Trump, businessman, philanthropist and reality TV personality, son of Donald Trump
- January 7
  - Chris Ayer, singer/songwriter and guitarist
  - Caros Fodor, mixed martial artist, brother of Phoenix Jones
  - Jon Lester, baseball player
  - Mallory Snyder, model and television personality
- January 8 – Jeff Francoeur, baseball player
- January 9
  - Jesse Broadwater, archer
  - Drew Brown, musician and songwriter
- January 11
  - Eddie Alvarez, mixed martial artist
  - Pennjamin Bannekar, music artist and songwriter
  - Melissa Ben-Ishay, founder and creator of Baked by Melissa
  - Kevin Boss, football player
  - Bradley Buckman, basketball player
- January 12
  - Tyler Blanski, Roman Catholic author, musician, and record producer
  - Scott Olsen, baseball player
  - Sam Richardson, actor, comedian, writer, and producer
- January 13
  - Nick Mangold, football player (d. 2025)
  - Nathaniel Motte, singer/songwriter, performer, music producer, composer, instrumentalist, and playwright
  - Adam Zimmer, football coach (d. 2022)
- January 14
  - Shagari Alleyne, basketball player
  - Stephanie Bruce, long-distance runner
- January 15
  - Marcos Berríos, astronaut for NASA
  - Megan Jendrick, Olympic swimmer
  - Victor Rasuk, actor
  - Ben Shapiro, political commentator and writer
- January 17 – Cassie Hager, basketball player
- January 18
  - Seung-Hui Cho, Korean-born Virginia Tech massacre gunman (d. 2007)
  - Kristy Lee Cook, singer
  - Benji Schwimmer, dancer
- January 19
  - Nate Bennett, football player
  - Lil Scrappy, rapper
- January 21
  - Luke Grimes, actor
  - Amy Hastings, athlete
  - Haloti Ngata, soccer player
- January 24
  - Nia Abdallah, Olympic Taekwondo practitioner
  - Justin Baldoni, actor, director, and filmmaker
  - Danny Baugher, football player
  - Ashley C. Williams, actress
- January 25
  - Jay Briscoe, wrestler (d. 2023)
  - Kaiji Tang, voice actor
- January 26
  - Prince Bagdasarian, director, screenwriter, and editor
  - Kelli Barrett, actress
- January 27
  - Nomiki Konst, activist
  - Davetta Sherwood, actress and musician
- January 28
  - Stephen Gostkowski, football player
  - Andre Iguodala, basketball player
- January 29 – Jameson Bostic, American-born New Zealand boxer
- January 30
  - Arthur Chu, columnist and Jeopardy! contestant
  - Kid Cudi, actor, rapper, record producer, and singer/songwriter
- January 31
  - Paul Baccaglini, entrepreneur and investor
  - Vernon Davis, football player

=== February ===
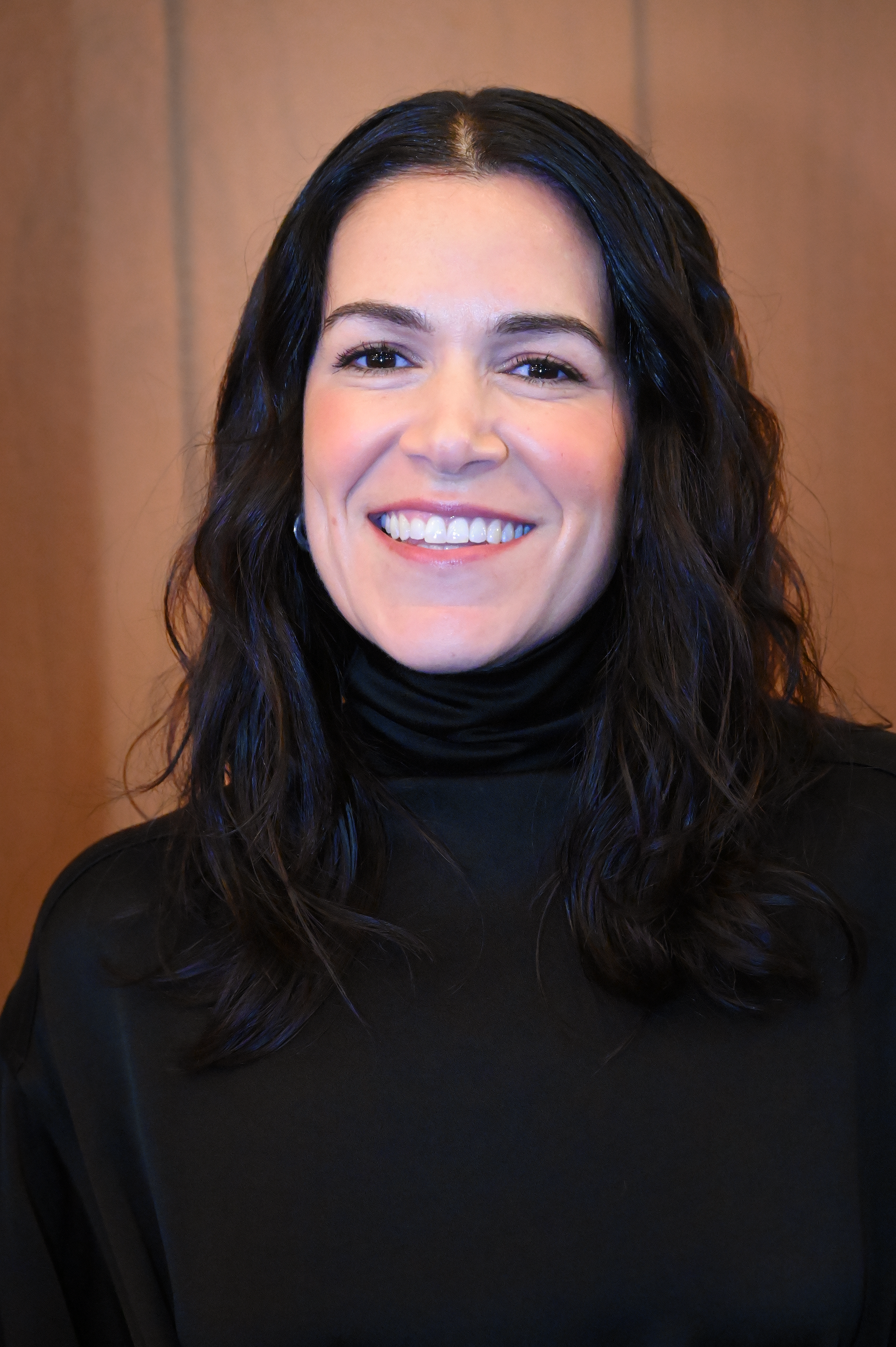
Abbi Jacobson

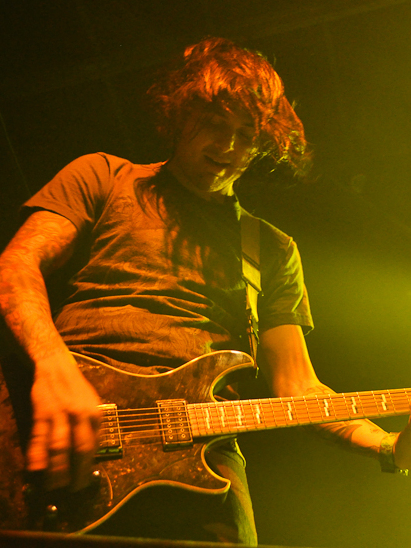
Matt Good

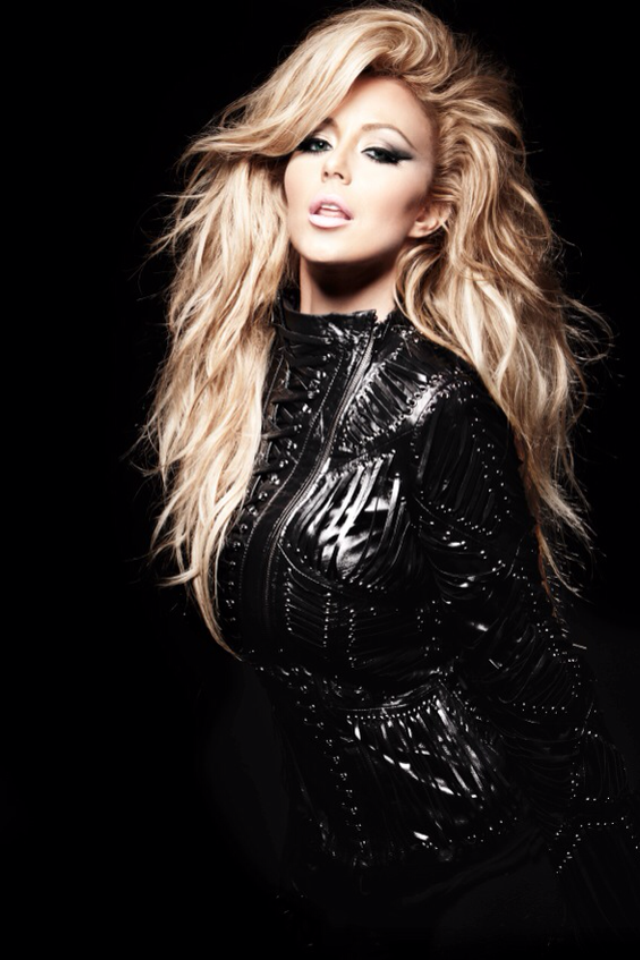
Aubrey O'Day

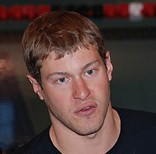
Peter Vanderkaay

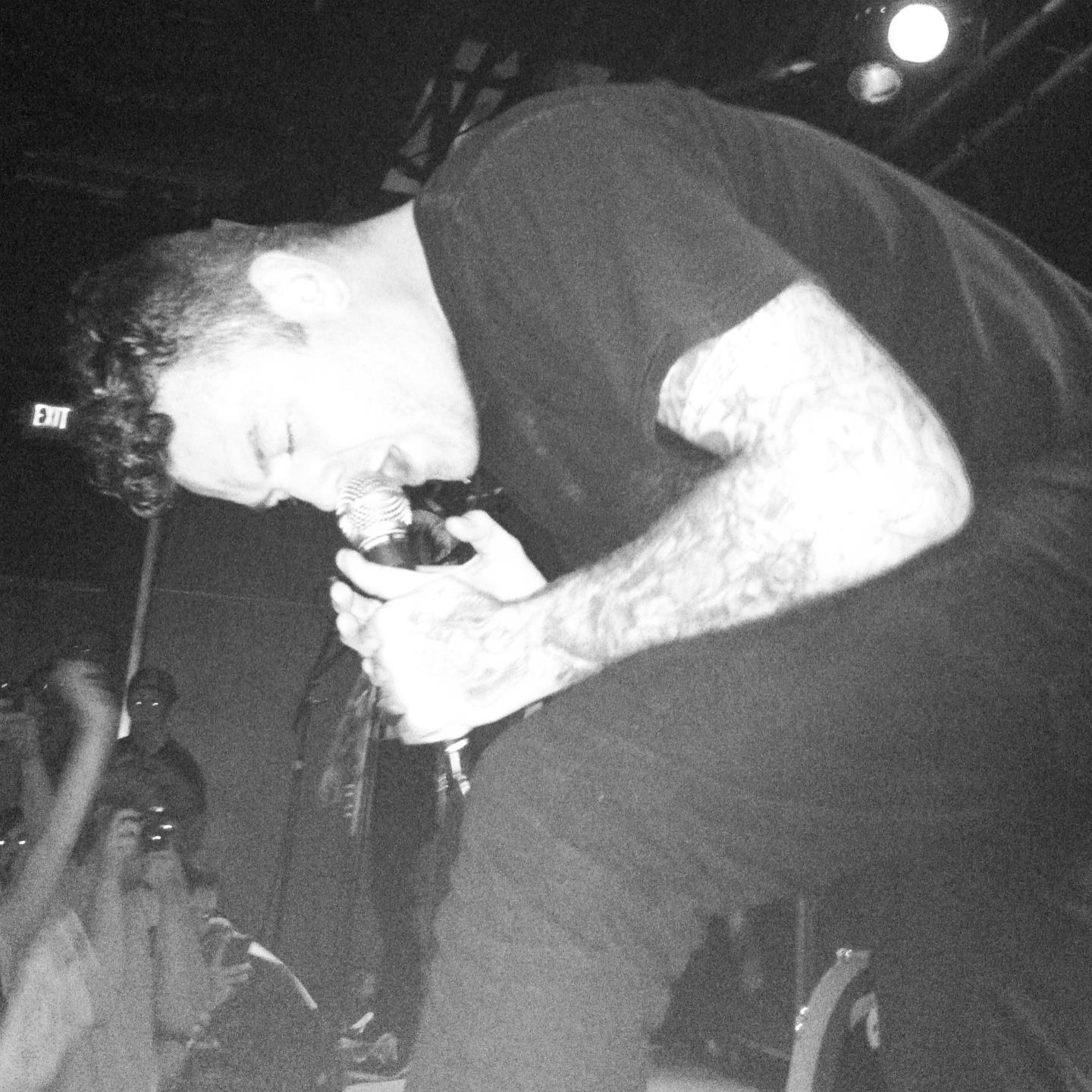
Buddy Nielsen

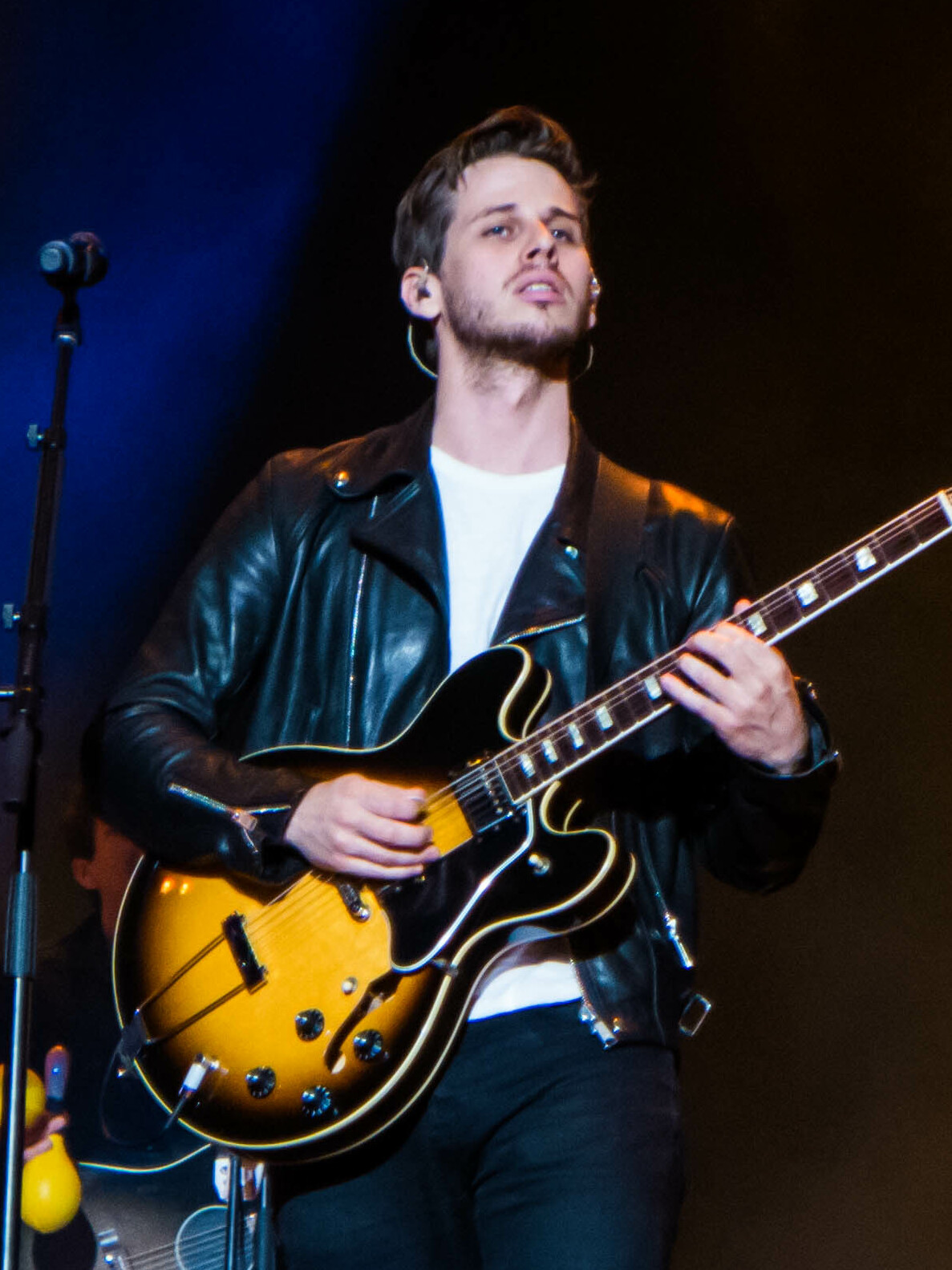
Mark Foster

- February 1
  - Casey Ashley, bass fisherman
  - Abbi Jacobson, comedian, writer and actress
  - Lee Thompson Young, actor (d. 2013)
- February 2 – David Pakman, political pundit
- February 3
  - Elizabeth Holmes, convicted fraudster, founder of Theranos
  - Matthew Moy, actor
  - Phillipe Nover, mixed martial artist
- February 5
  - Jonny Kim, Navy SEAL, physician, and astronaut
  - Nate Salley, football player
- February 6
  - Dek Bake, football player
  - Mike Ballard, baseball player
  - Zered Bassett, skateboarder
- February 7
  - Dominique Byrd, football player
  - Anna Kooiman, American-born Australian news anchor and television personality
- February 8
  - Kevin Ara, soccer player
  - Cecily Strong, actress and comedian
- February 9
  - Maurice Ager, basketball player
  - Logan Bartholomew, actor
  - Kourtney Brown, Bahamian-born actor, host, model, and visual artist
- February 10
  - Kayla Ard, basketball coach
  - Courtney Brown, football player
- February 11
  - Sril Art, visual artist, muralist, and entrepreneur
  - Matt Good, singer and guitarist for From First to Last
  - Aubrey O'Day, singer, actress, and member of Danity Kane (2005–2020)
- February 12
  - Tony Ferguson, mixed martial artist
  - Brad Keselowski, stock car driver
  - Peter Vanderkaay, Olympic swimmer
- February 13
  - LaToya Bond, basketball player
  - Matt Buschmann, baseball player
  - Brina Palencia, voice actress
- February 14
  - Janeshia Adams-Ginyard, actress, stunt woman, and wrestler
  - Matt Barr, actor
- February 15
  - Mitchell Boggs, baseball player
  - Matt and Ross Duffer, twin screenwriters and directors
- February 16 – Brent Bookwalter, cyclist
- February 17
  - Calvin Bannister, football player
  - Jimmy Jacobs, wrestler
  - Drew Miller, ice hockey player
- February 18
  - Brian Bogusevic, baseball player
  - Darrick Brown, football player
  - Buddy Nielsen, singer/songwriter and frontman for Senses Fail
  - Chris Richardson, contestant on American Idol (season 6)
- February 19 – Marissa Meyer, novelist
- February 20
  - Brenton Awa, news anchor and politician
  - Ben Lovejoy, ice hockey player
- February 22
  - Kristen Soltis Anderson, political pollster and television personality
  - Juanita Brent, politician
- February 23 – Andy Bronkema, basketball coach
- February 24
  - Wilson Bethel, actor
  - Liz Bogus, soccer player
- February 27 – James Augustine, basketball player
- February 28
  - Quincy Black, football player
  - Sanders Bohlke, singer/songwriter
- February 29
  - Mark Foster, singer and composer, frontman of Foster the People
  - Alicia Hollowell, softball player
  - Cullen Jones, Olympic swimmer

=== March ===
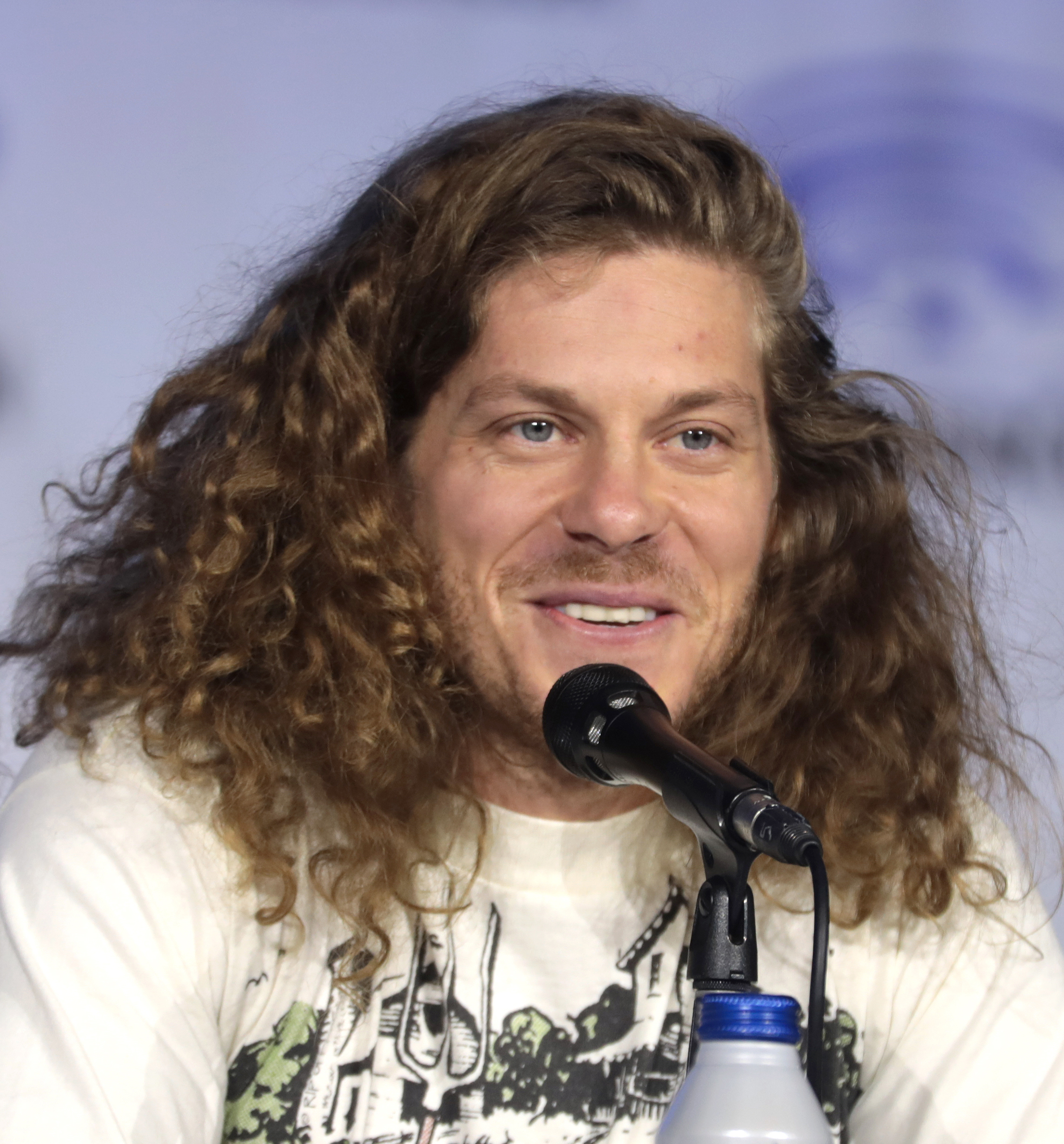
Blake Anderson

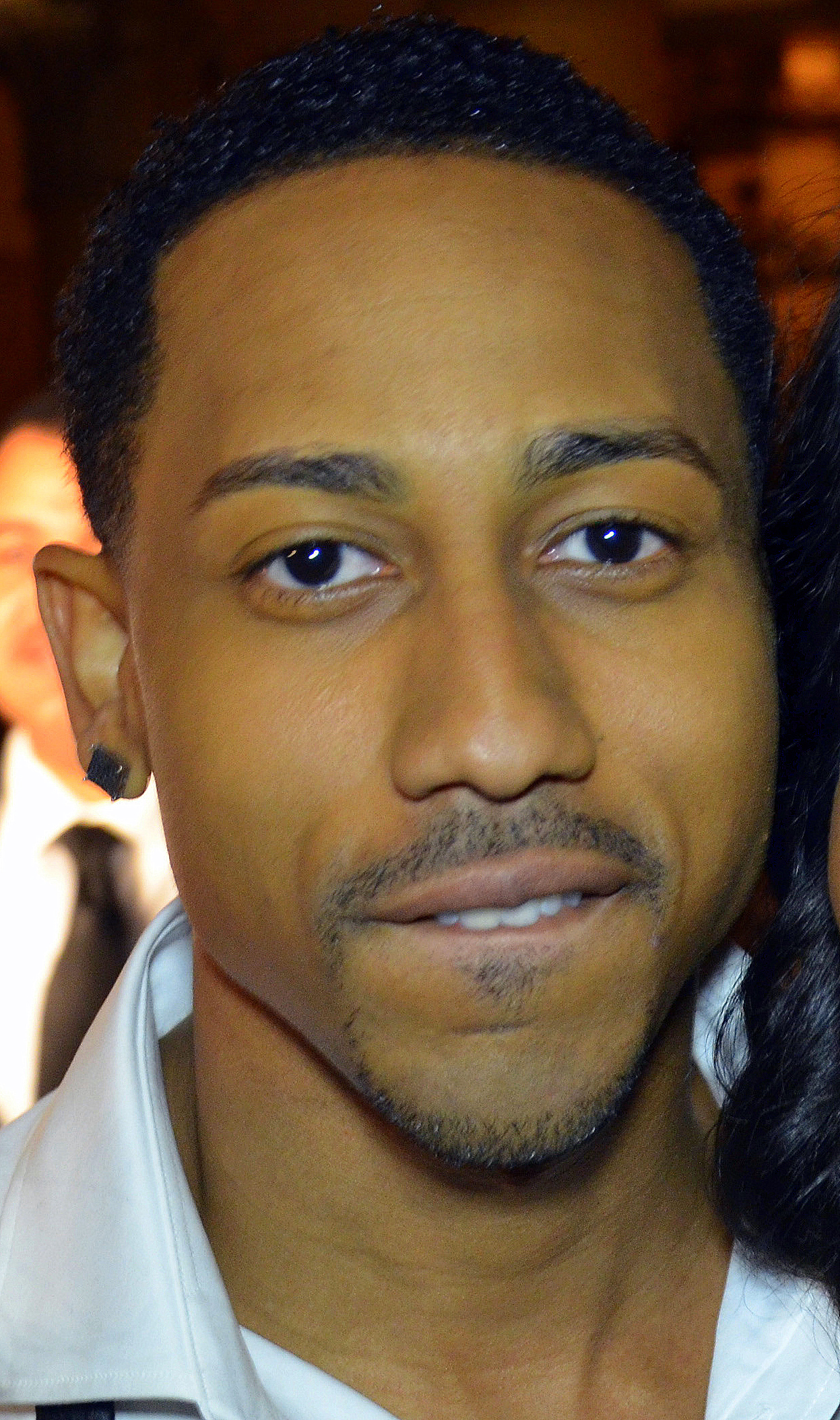
Brandon T. Jackson

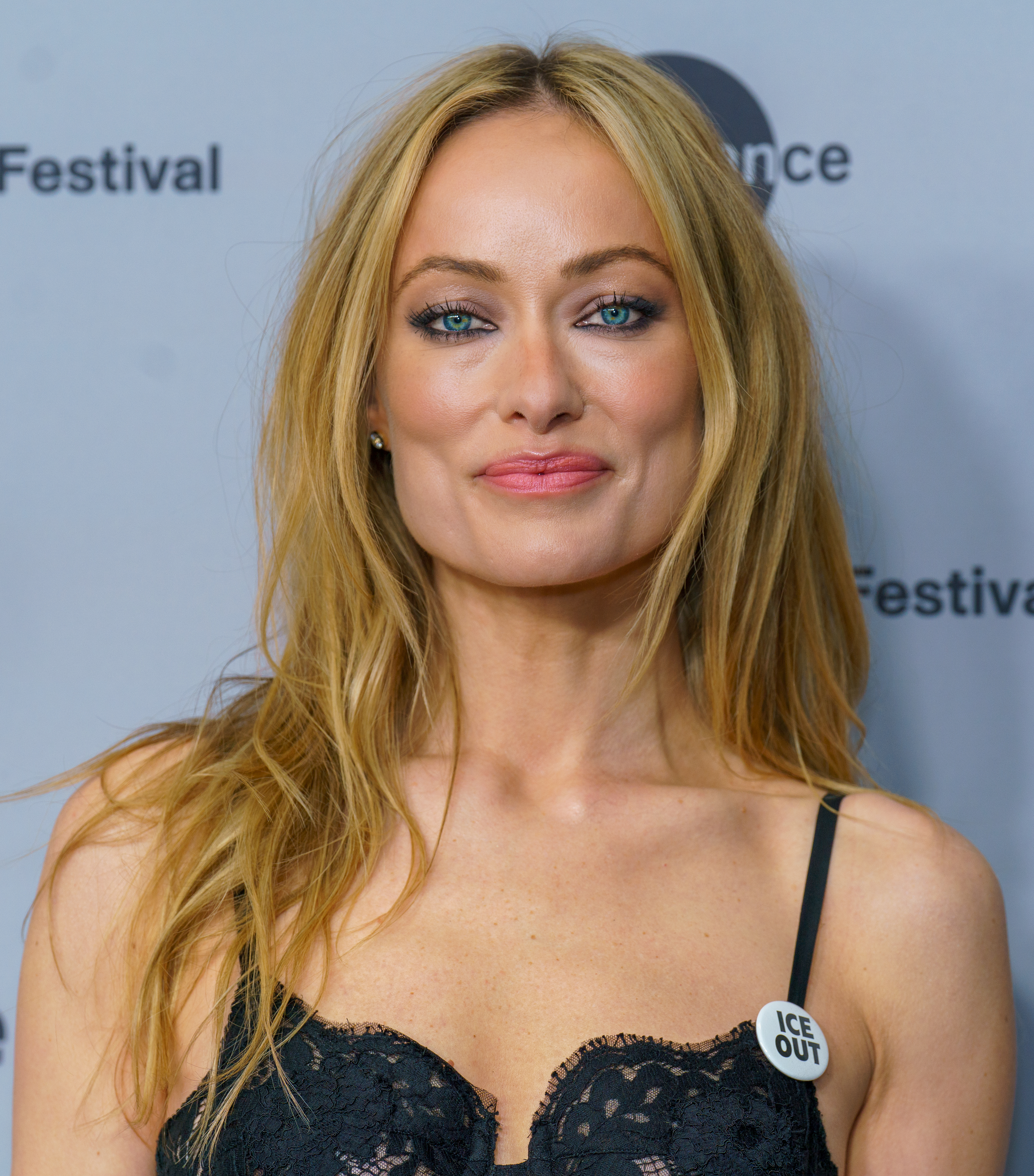
Olivia Wilde

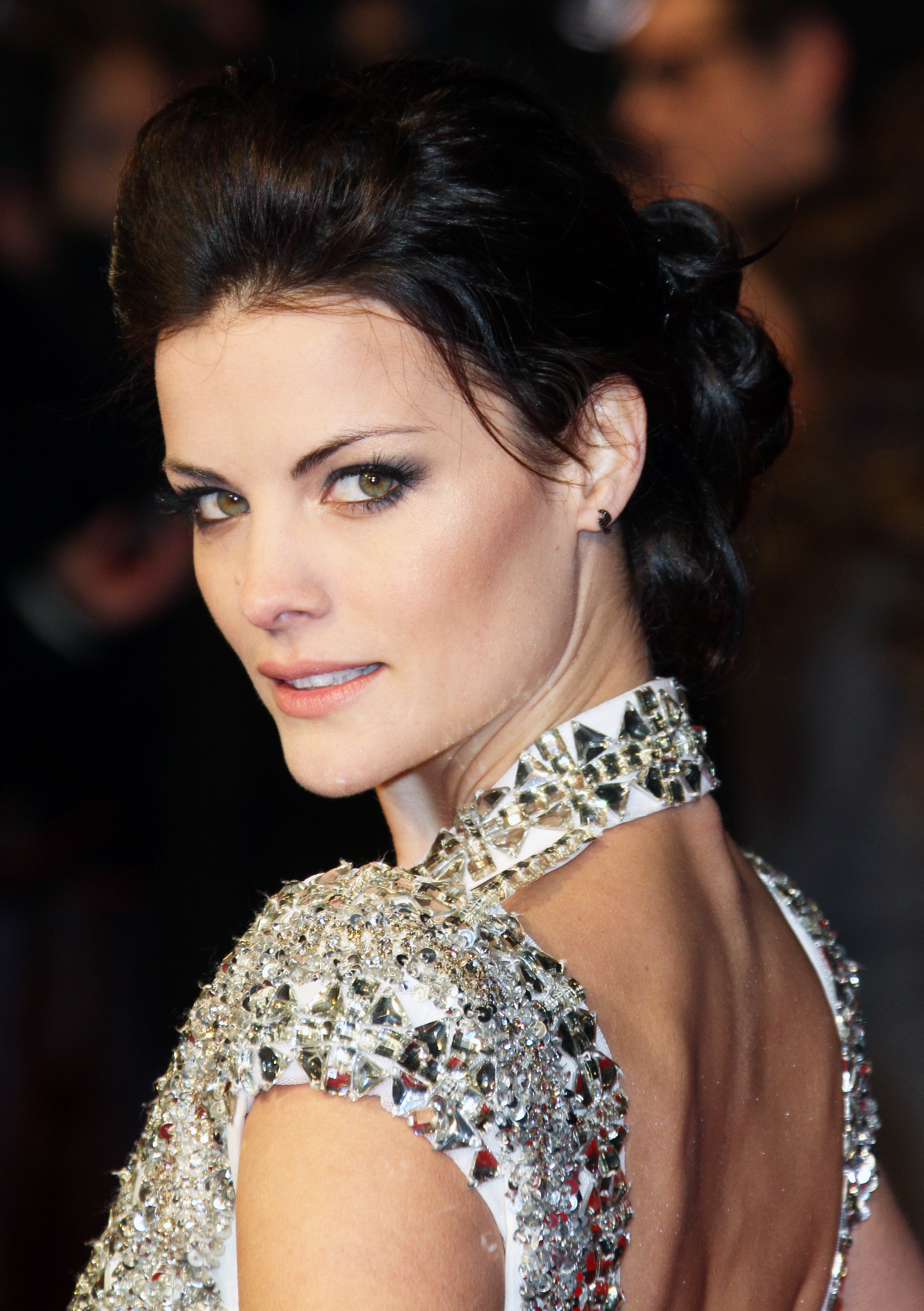
Jaimie Alexander

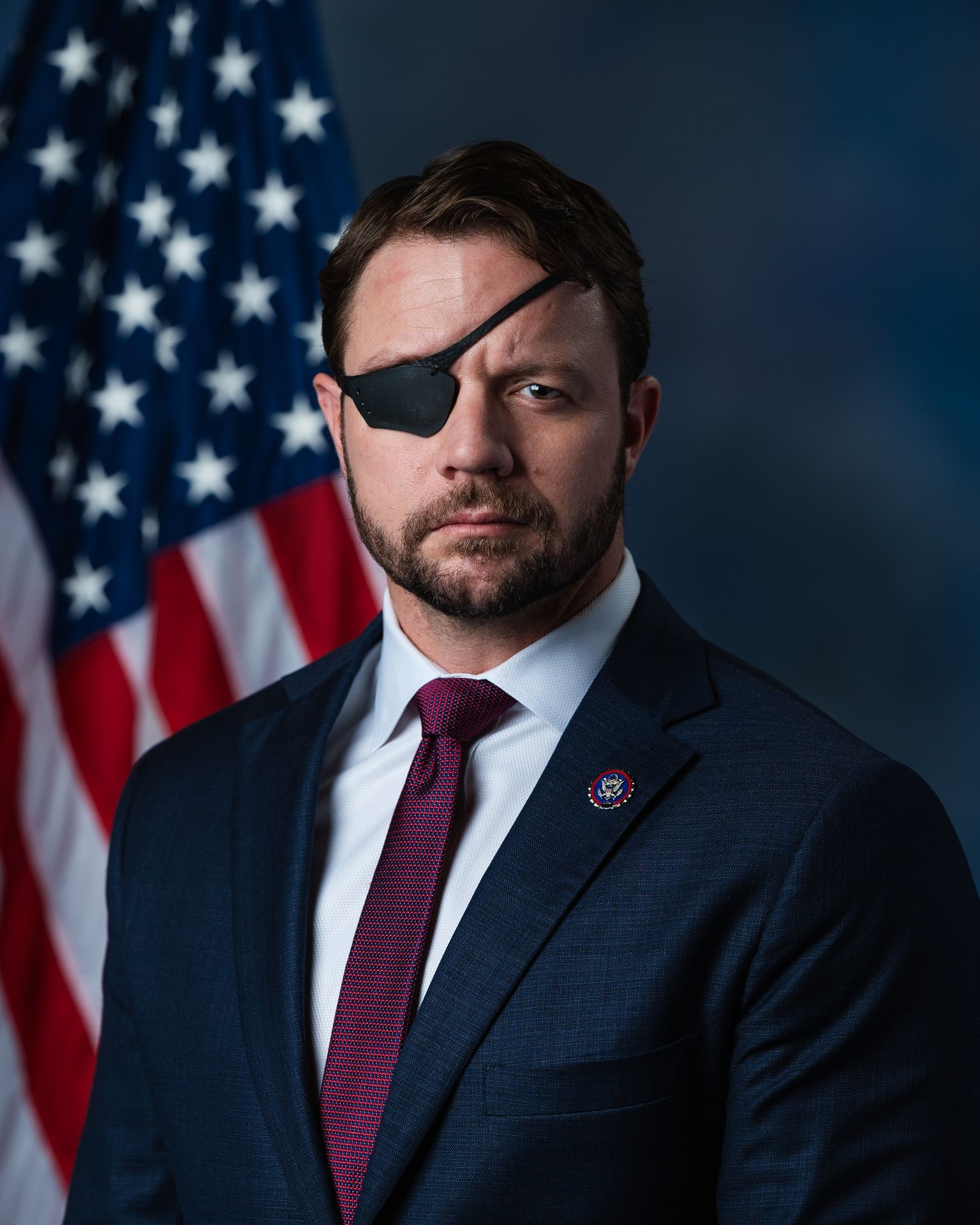
Dan Crenshaw

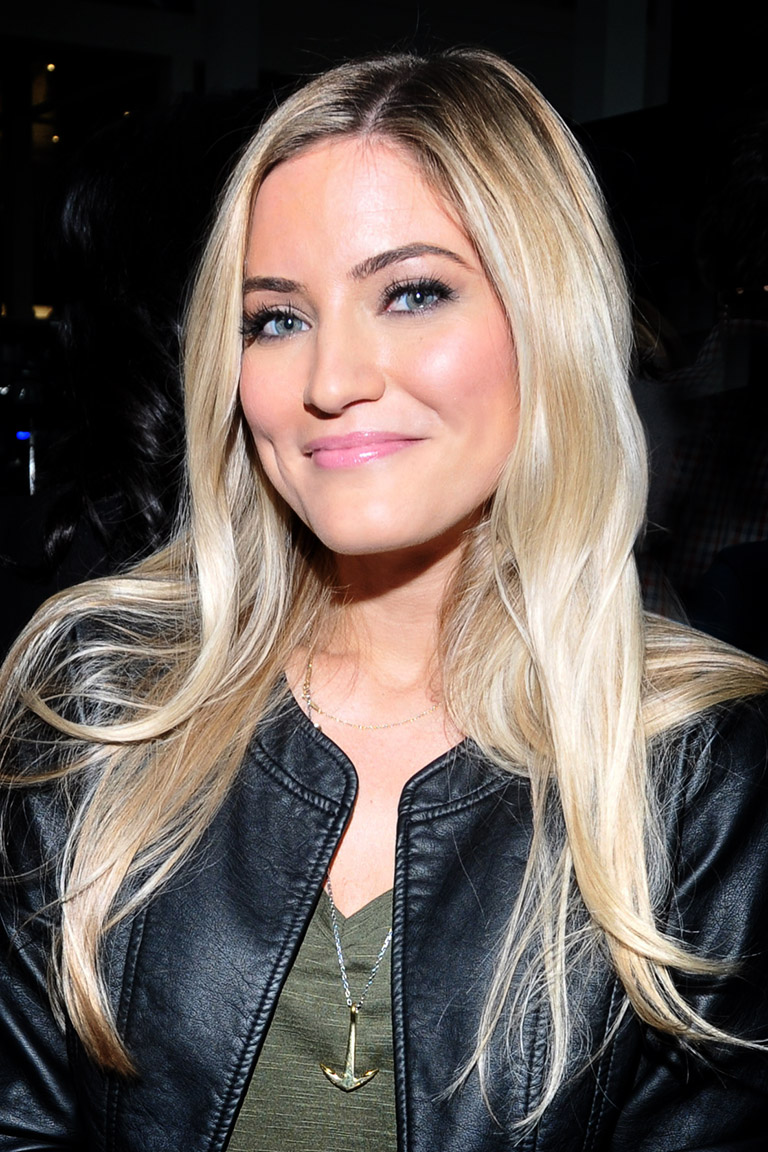
Justine Ezarik

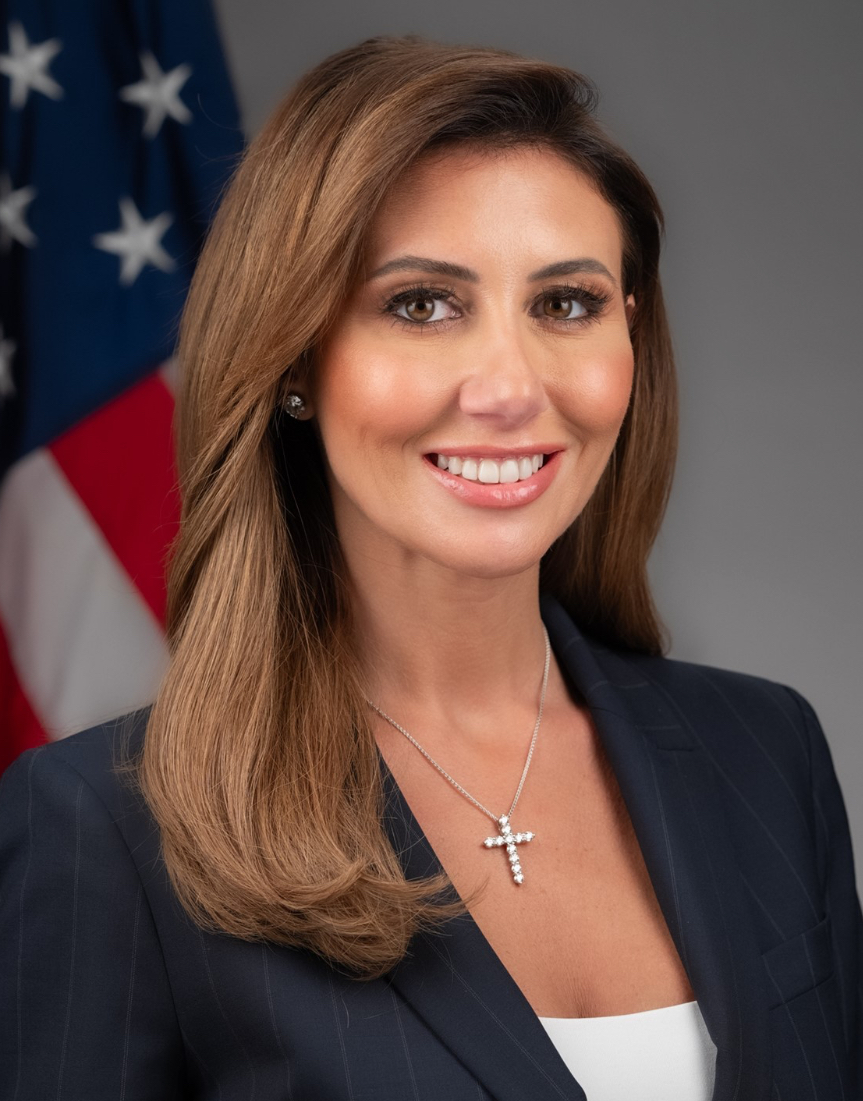
Alina Habba

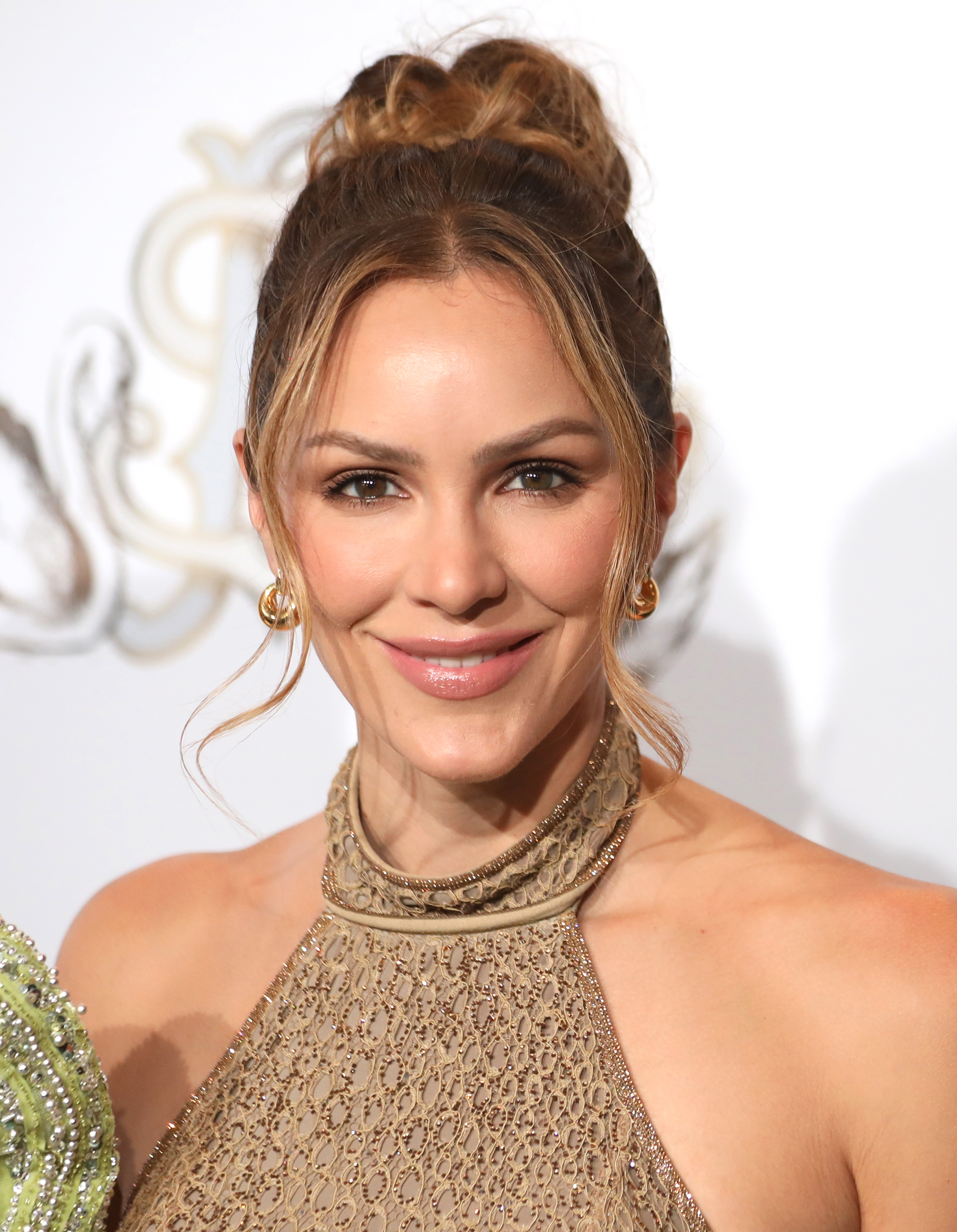
Katharine McPhee

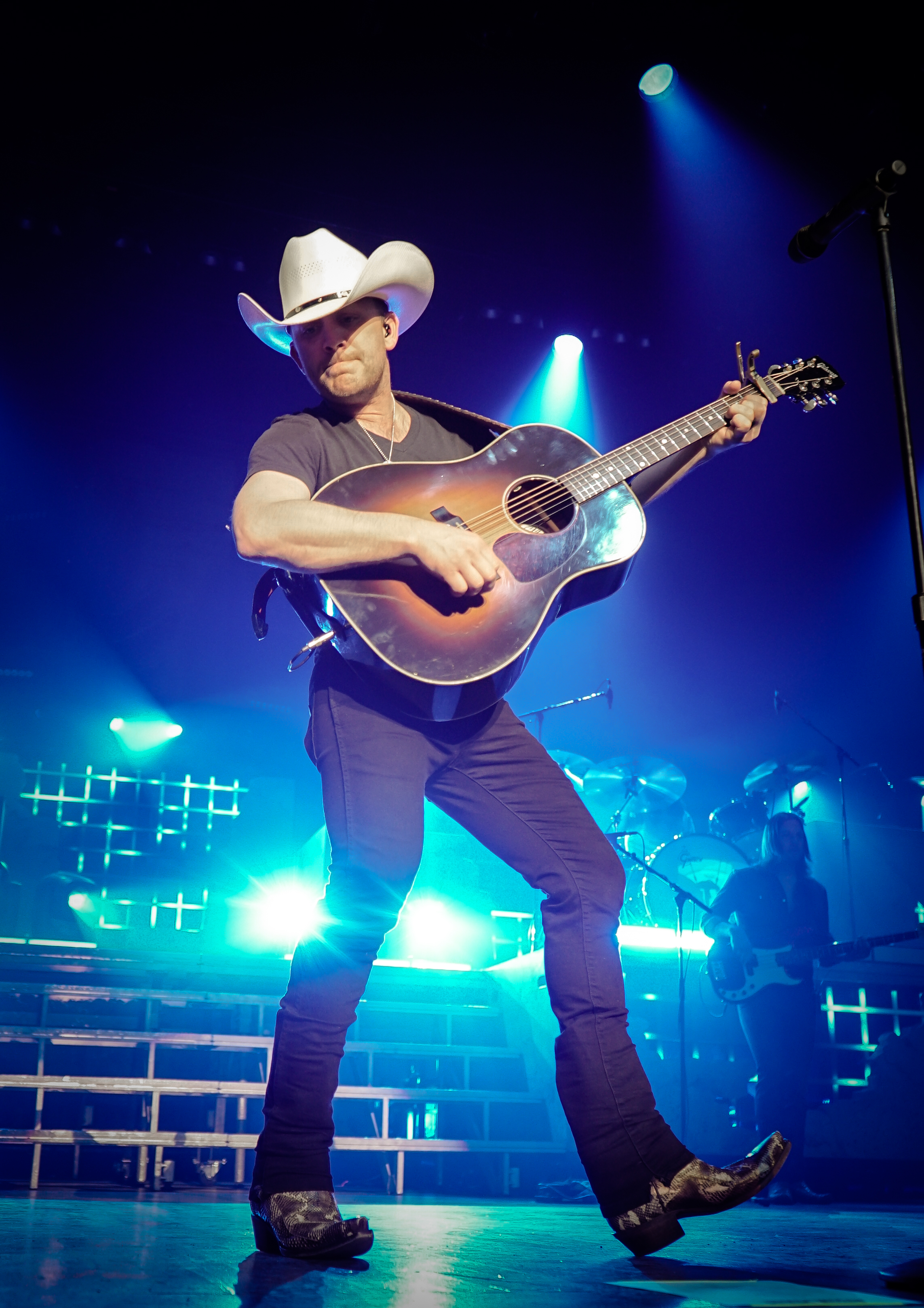
Justin Moore

- March 1 – Brandon Stanton, photographer and blogger
- March 2
  - Chris Algieri, boxer and kickboxer
  - Blake Anderson, actor, comedian, producer, screenwriter, and fashion designer
  - John Bernecker, stunt performer (d. 2017)
  - Trent Garrett, actor and model
  - Ian Sinclair, voice actor
- March 3
  - Curtis Brown, football player
  - Mike Gallagher, politician
  - Santonio Holmes, football player
  - Ivar, wrestler
  - Andy Pope, golfer
- March 4 – Zak Whitbread, soccer player
- March 5 – Aarthi Agarwal, actress
- March 6
  - Prescott Burgess, football player
  - Chris Tomson, musician, drummer for Vampire Weekend
- March 7
  - Steve Burtt Jr., American-born Ukrainian basketball player
  - Brandon T. Jackson, stand-up comedian, actor and rapper
- March 8
  - Fernanda Andrade, Brazilian-born actress and model
  - Jon Burklo, soccer coach
- March 9
  - Priscilla Ahn, singer/songwriter and multi-instrumentalist
  - Kris Budden, sports reporter
  - Julia Mancuso, Olympic skier
- March 10
  - Aaron Bates, baseball player
  - Olivia Wilde, actress and model
- March 11
  - Rob Brown, actor
  - Eric Calderone, guitarist and YouTuber
- March 12 – Jaimie Alexander, actress
- March 13
  - Landon Ashworth, actor, producer, and writer
  - Rachael Bella, actress
  - Brandon Cole, basketball player
- March 14
  - Aric Almirola, Cuban-born stock car racing driver
  - Ambrosia Anderson, basketball player
  - Randor Bierd, baseball player
  - Travis Brody, football player
  - Ahmad Brooks, football player
  - Dan Crenshaw, politician and Navy SEAL
- March 15 – Lee England Jr., violinist
- March 16
  - Robby Bostain, American-born Israeli basketball player
  - Levi Brown, football player
- March 17
  - Ryan Beaver, country singer/songwriter
  - Ryan Rottman, actor
- March 18
  - Molly Gray, politician, 83rd Lieutenant Governor of Vermont
  - Vonzell Solomon, singer
- March 20
  - Justine Ezarik, Internet celebrity and actress
  - Christy Carlson Romano, actress and singer
  - Marcus Vick, football player
- March 21
  - Roozbeh Aliabadi, Iranian-born advisor and commentator on geopolitical risk and geoeconomics
- March 22 – La'Tangela Atkinson, basketball player
- March 23 – McKinley Belcher III, actor
- March 24 – Chris Bosh, basketball player
- March 25
  - Alina Habba, lawyer and managing partner of Habba, Madaio & Associates
  - Katharine McPhee, singer-songwriter and actress
- March 26
  - Eric Bellinger, singer/songwriter and producer
  - Sara Jean Underwood, model
  - Brady Walkinshaw, politician
- March 27
  - Stefano Barberi, Brazilian-born cyclist
  - Stephen Rhodes, stock car driver
  - Jon Paul Steuer, actor and musician (d. 2018)
- March 28
  - Stephen Amritraj, tennis player
  - Arliss Beach, football player
  - Sarah Benck, singer/songwriter
  - Stephen Bowen, football player
  - Bill Switzer, Canadian-born voice actor
  - Rich Wilkerson Jr., pastor
- March 29
  - Nate Adams, motocross rider
  - Nikki Blue, basketball player and coach
- March 30
  - Justin Moore, country singer
  - Anna Nalick, singer
- March 31
  - Jack Antonoff, indie pop musician
  - Peter Porte, actor

=== April ===
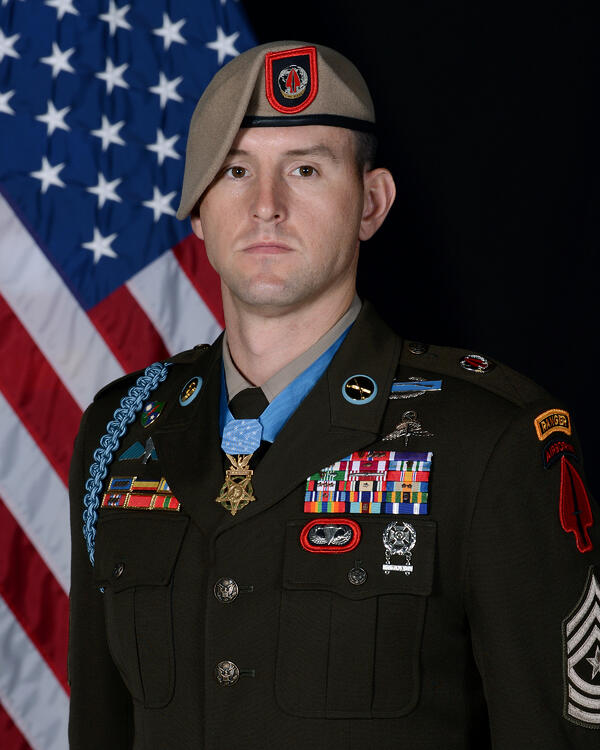
Thomas Payne

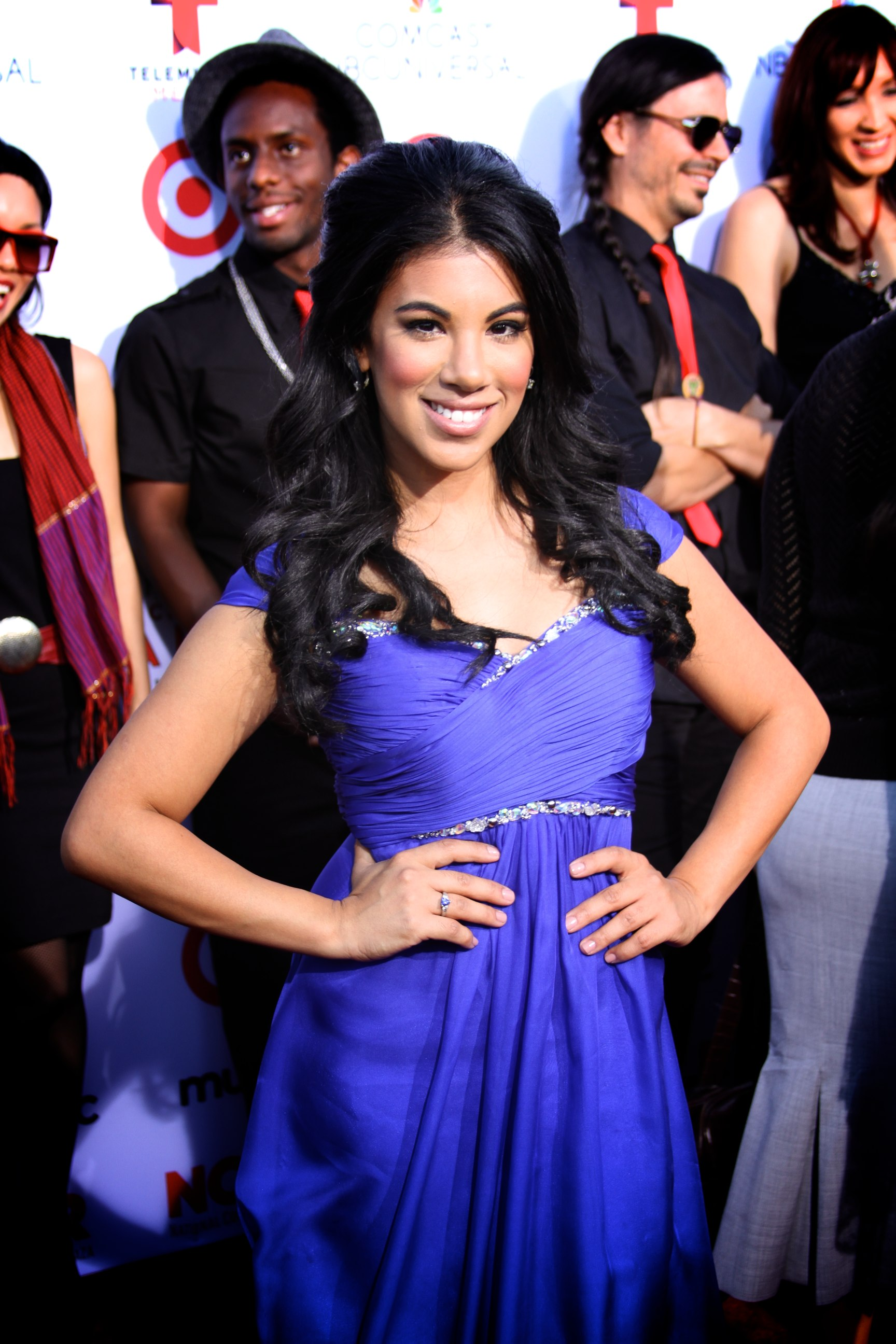
Chrissie Fit

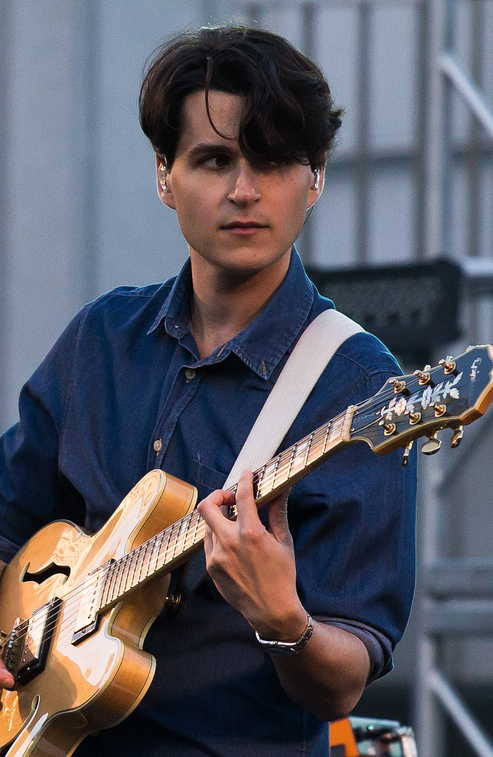
Ezra Koenig

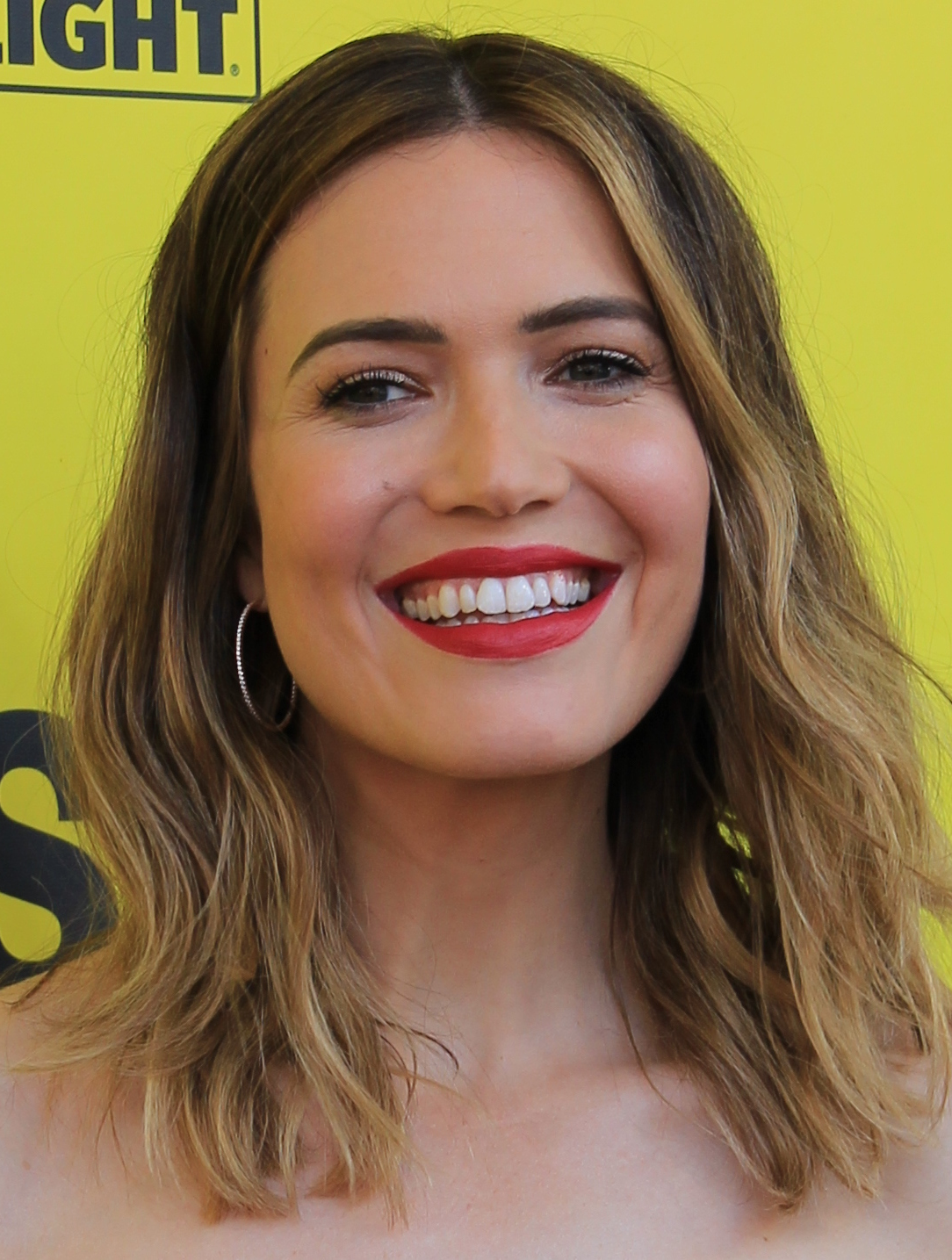
Mandy Moore

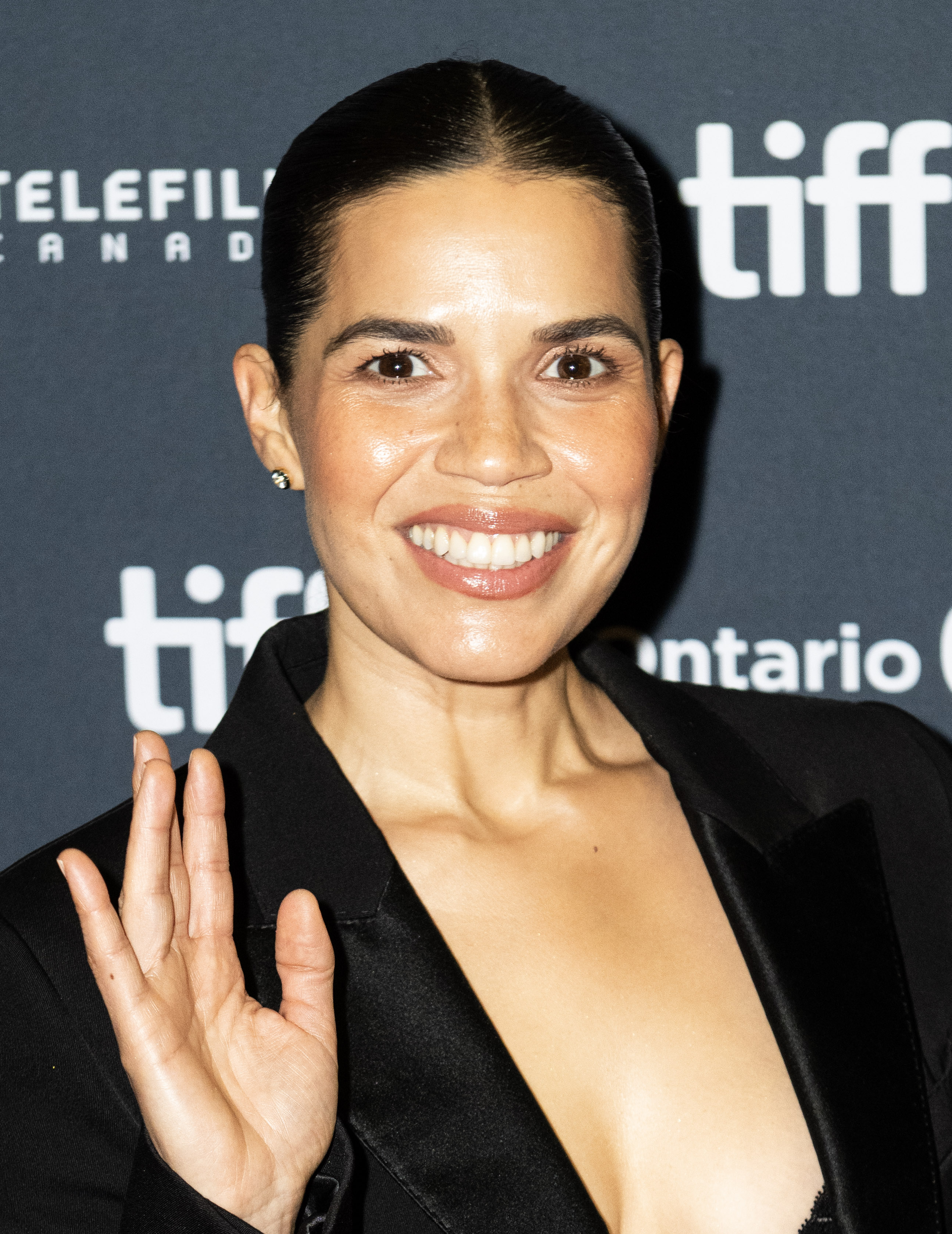
America Ferrera

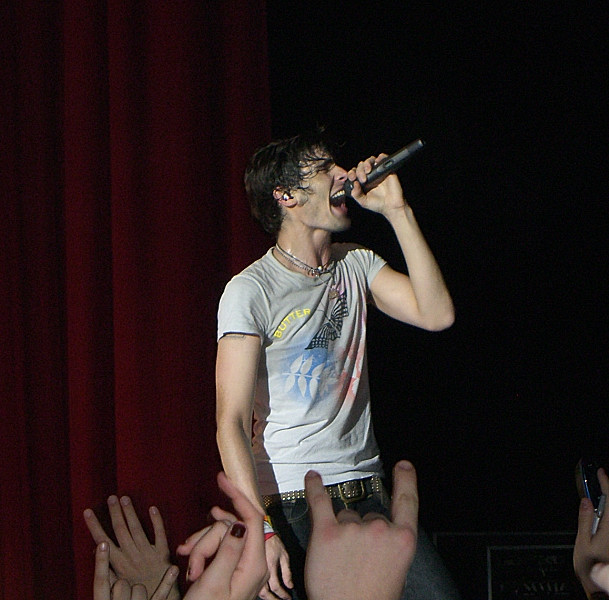
Tyson Ritter

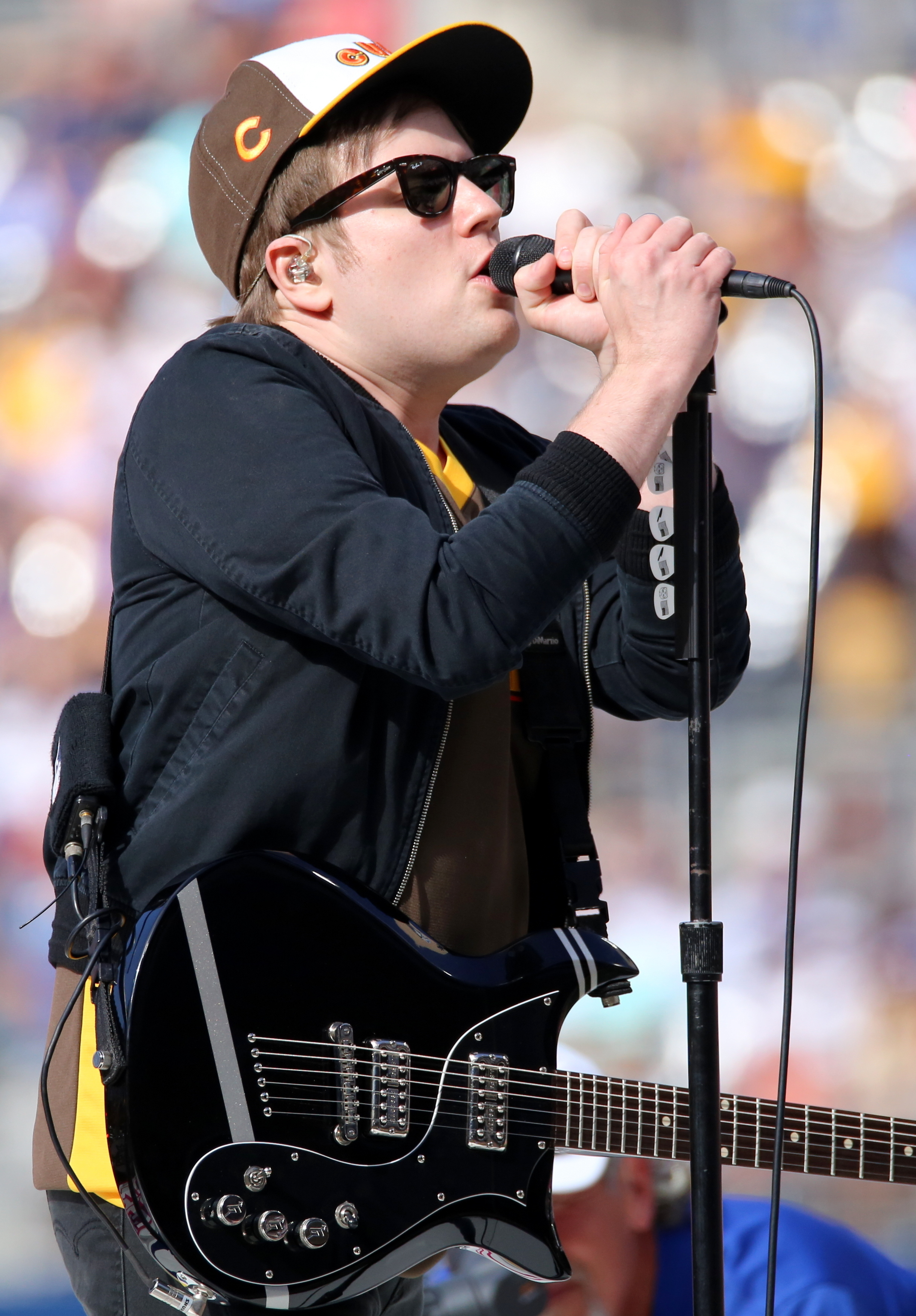
Patrick Stump

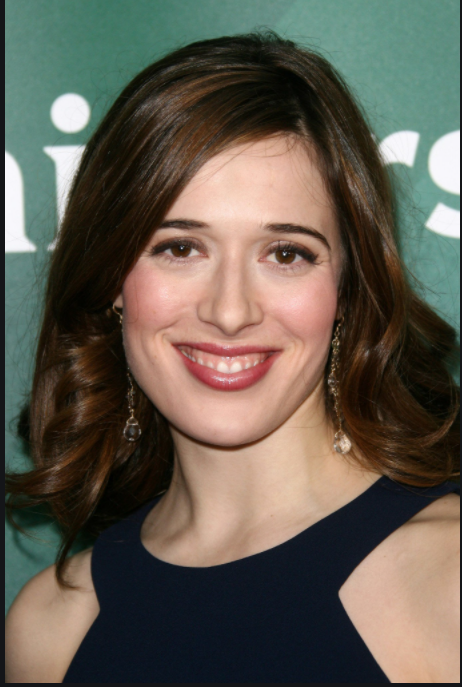
Marina Squerciati

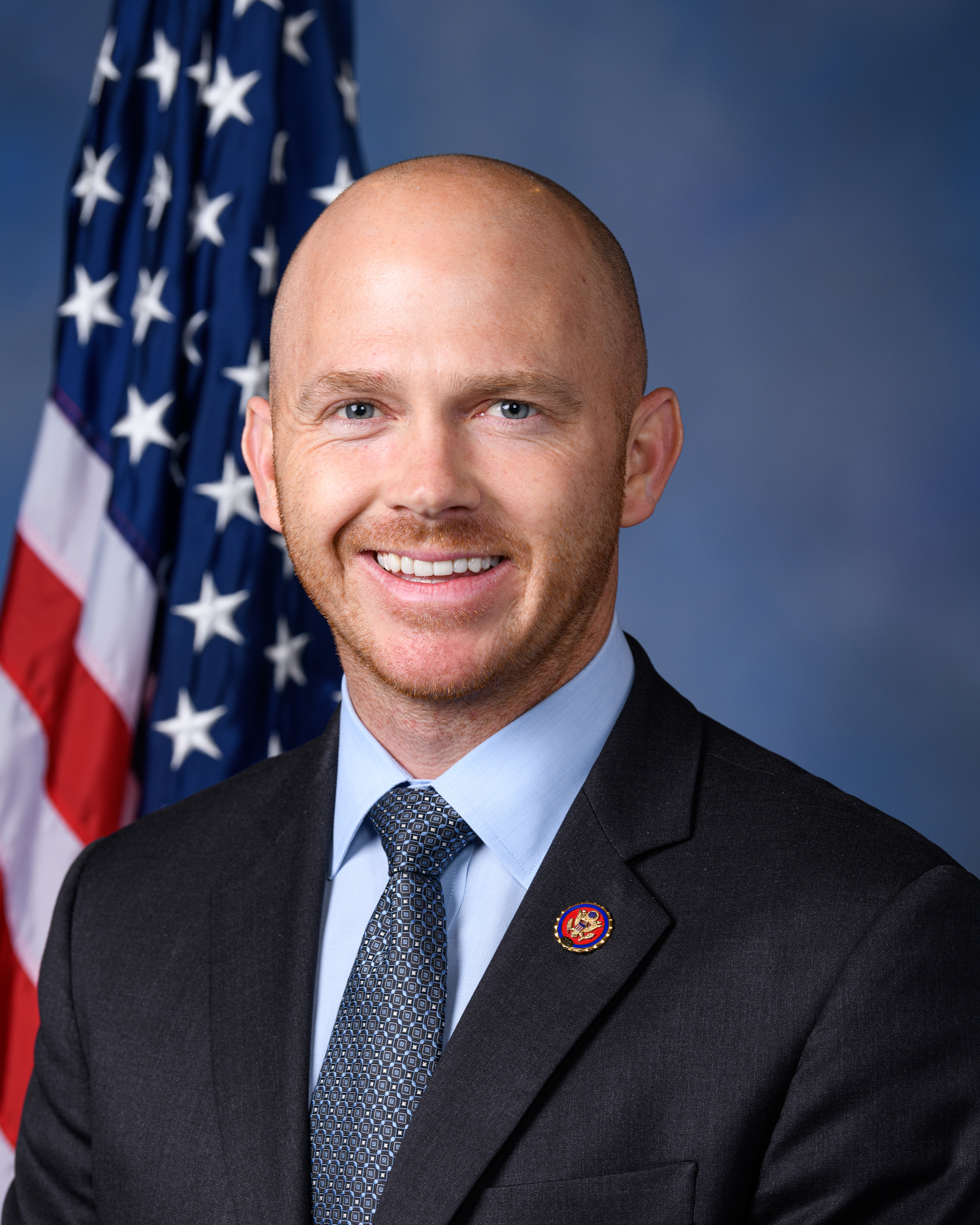
William Timmons

- April 1
  - Johnny Baldwin, football player
  - Maximilian Osinski, actor
- April 2
  - Mariana Atencio, television host, author, and motivational speaker
  - Thomas Payne, U.S. Army Delta Force Veteran and Medal of Honor Recipient
  - Ashley Peldon, actress
- April 3
  - Chrissie Fit, actress and singer
  - Joshua Safdie, actor and filmmaker
- April 4
  - Brian Bell, football player
  - Sean May, basketball player
- April 5
  - Marshall Allman, actor
  - Danny Baranowsky, electronic music composer
  - Phil Wickham, musician
- April 6 – Max Bemis, singer and frontman for Say Anything
- April 8
  - Matt Bassuener, football player
  - Ezra Koenig, musician
  - Brandon Scott, politician, mayor of Baltimore, Maryland (2020–present)
  - Taran Noah Smith, actor
  - Kirsten Storms, actress
- April 10
  - Jeremy Barrett, pair skater
  - Natasha Melnick, actress
  - Mandy Moore, singer-songwriter, actress and fashion designer
- April 11
  - Colin Clark, soccer player (d. 2019)
  - Kelli Garner, actress
- April 12
  - Michael Arceneaux, writer
  - brentalfloss, singer/songwriter, composer, and lyricist
- April 13
  - Josh Abercrombie, wrestler
  - John Stefanski, politician
- April 14
  - Raumesh Akbari, politician
  - Richard Boswell, stock car racing driver
  - Adán Sánchez, singer (d. 2004)
- April 16
  - Amelia Atwater-Rhodes, author
  - Teddy Blass, composer and record producer
  - Noah Fleiss, actor
- April 18
  - Red Bryant, football player
  - America Ferrera, actress
- April 20
  - Sophia Amoruso, businesswoman and founder of Nasty Gal
  - Garett Bischoff, referee and wrestler, son of Eric Bischoff
  - Mihail Etropolski, fencer
  - Anthony Fasano, football player
  - Tyson Griffin, mixed martial artist
  - Rob Kersey, singer and frontman for Psychostick
  - Harris Wittels, actor, producer and screenwriter (d. 2015)
- April 21 – Shayna Fox, voice actress
- April 22
  - Danielle Bounds, beauty pageant contestant
  - Whitny Braun, bioethicist, professor, investigative researcher, documentary filmmaker, and podcaster
- April 23 – Jesse Lee Soffer, actor
- April 24
  - Alan Belcher, mixed martial artist
  - Stephen L. Brusatte, paleontologist and evolutionary biologist
  - Tyson Ritter, singer, bassist and frontman for The All-American Rejects
- April 25
  - Robert Andino, Cuban-born baseball player
  - Jillian Bell, comedian, actress, and screenwriter
  - LaRue Burley, mixed martial artist
  - Derrick Byars, basketball player and entrepreneur
  - Melonie Diaz, actress
- April 26
  - Kimberly Brandão, American-born Portuguese footballer
  - Carlos Condit, mixed martial artist
  - Ryan O'Donohue, voice actor
  - Emily Wickersham, actress
- April 27
  - Milton Blanco, soccer player
  - Adam Botana, politician
  - Patrick Stump, singer-songwriter, frontman for Fall Out Boy
- April 28 – Ana Cruz Kayne, actress
- April 29
  - Taylor Cole, actress
  - Hallie Jackson, journalist
  - Marina Squerciati, actress
- April 30
  - Seimone Augustus, basketball player
  - Shawn Daivari, wrestler
  - William Timmons, politician

=== May ===
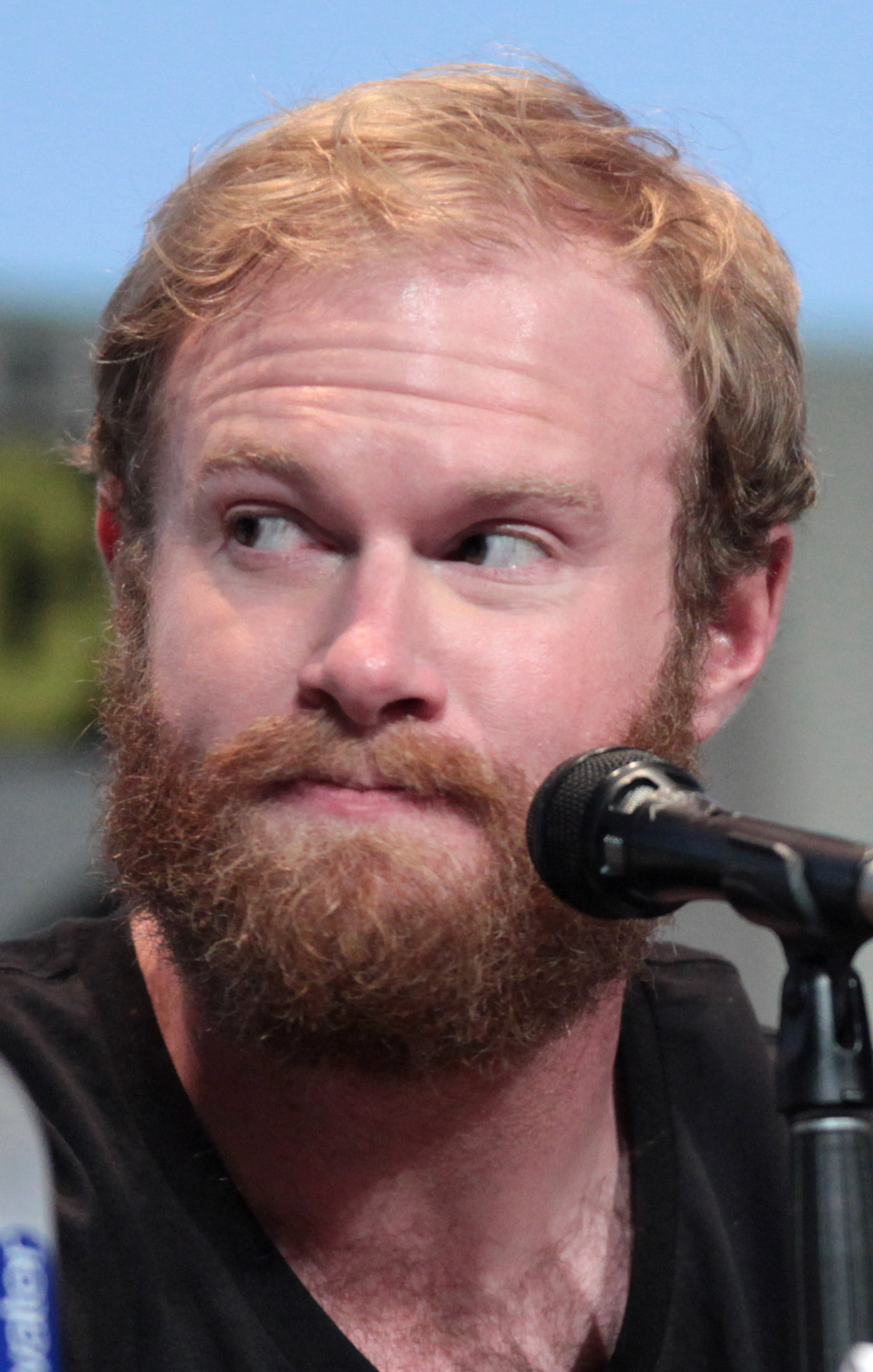
Henry Zebrowski

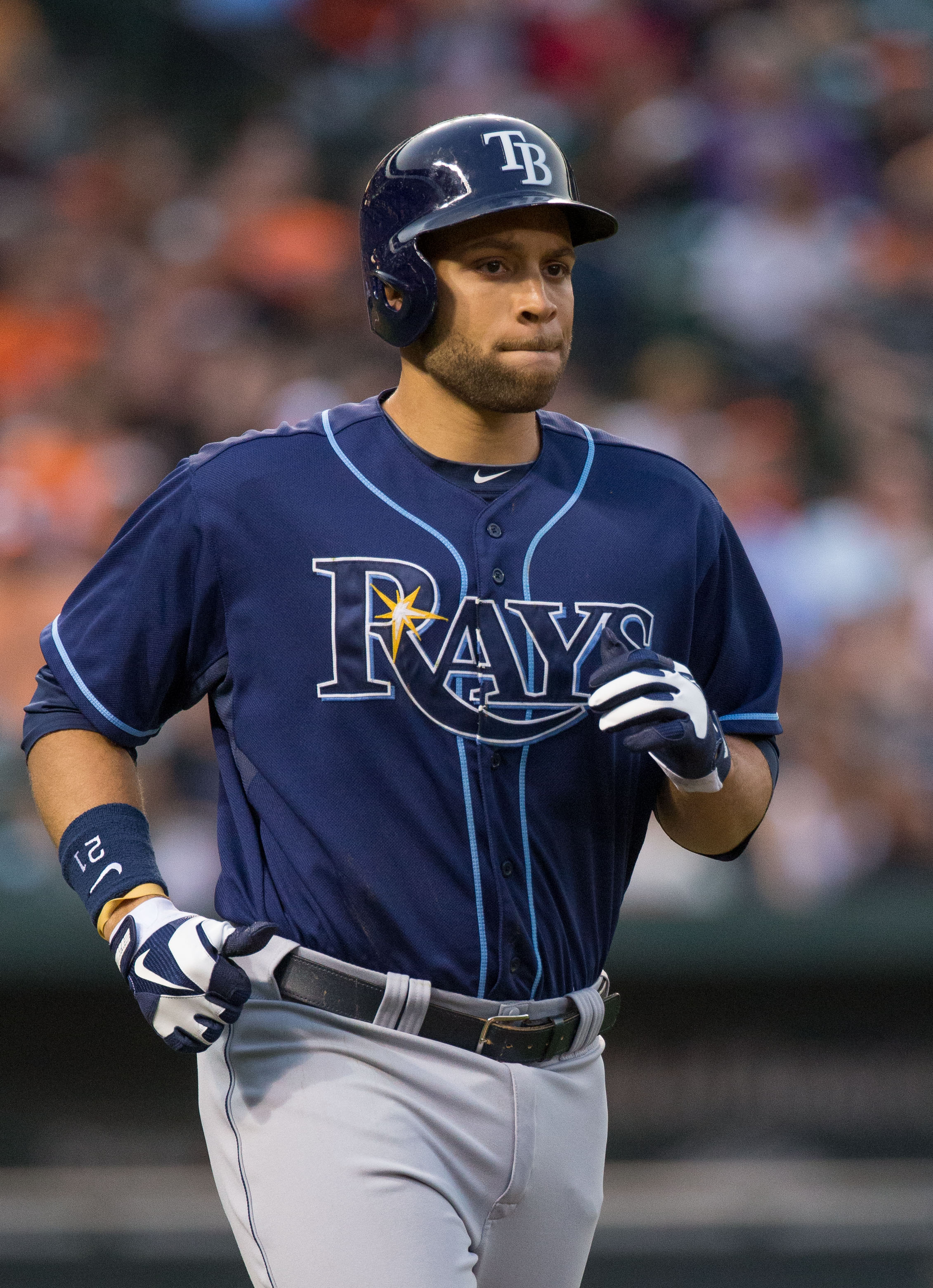
James Loney

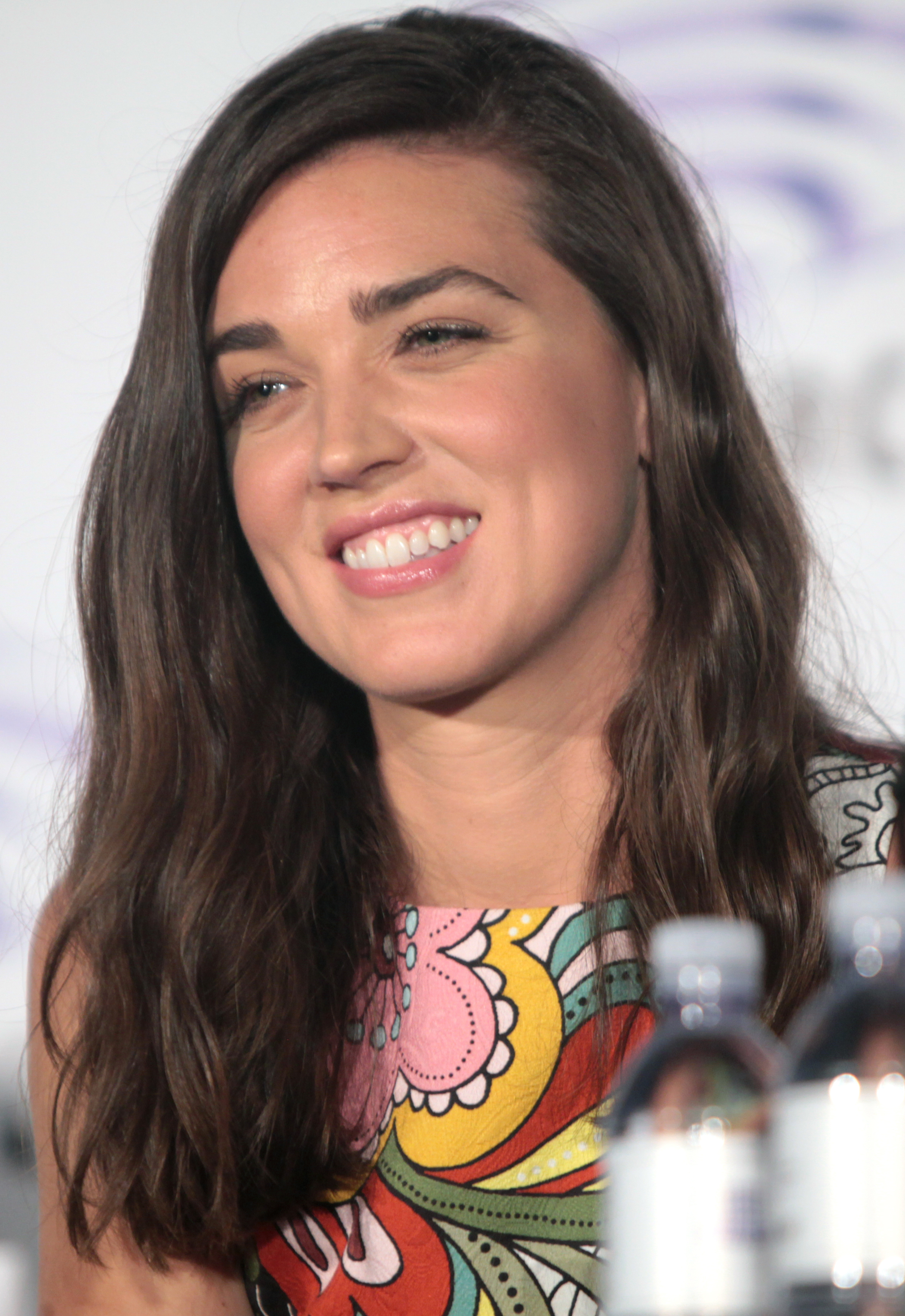
Marissa Neitling

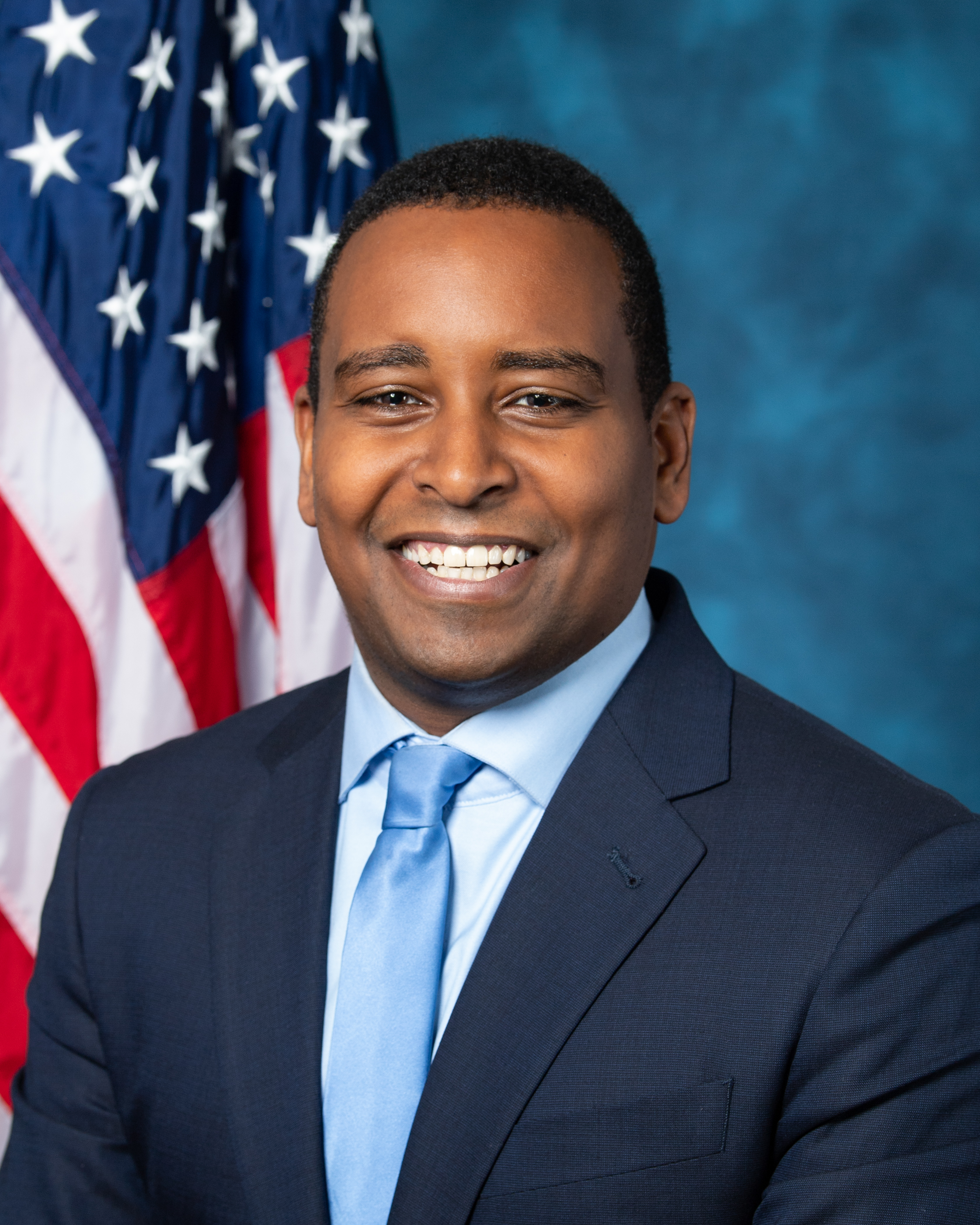
Joe Neguse

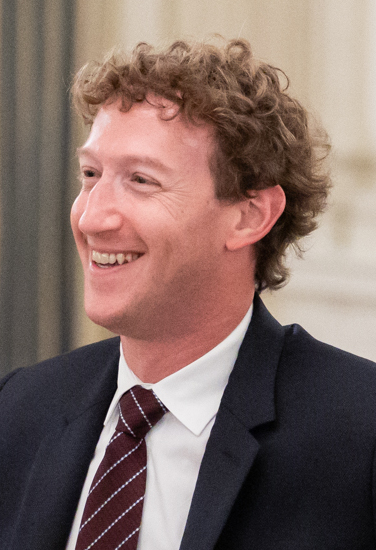
Mark Zuckerberg

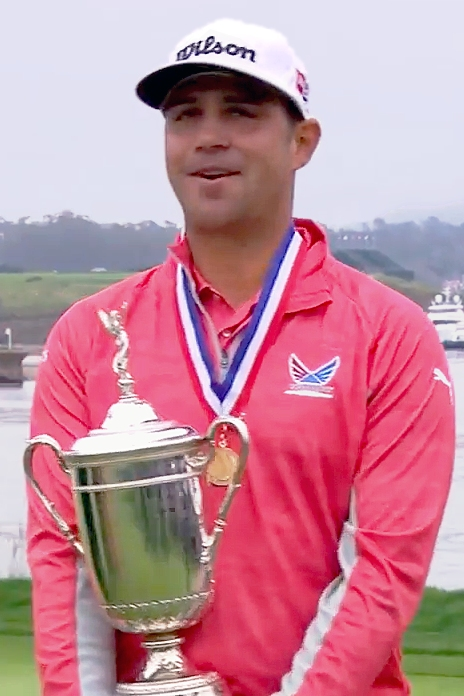
Gary Woodland

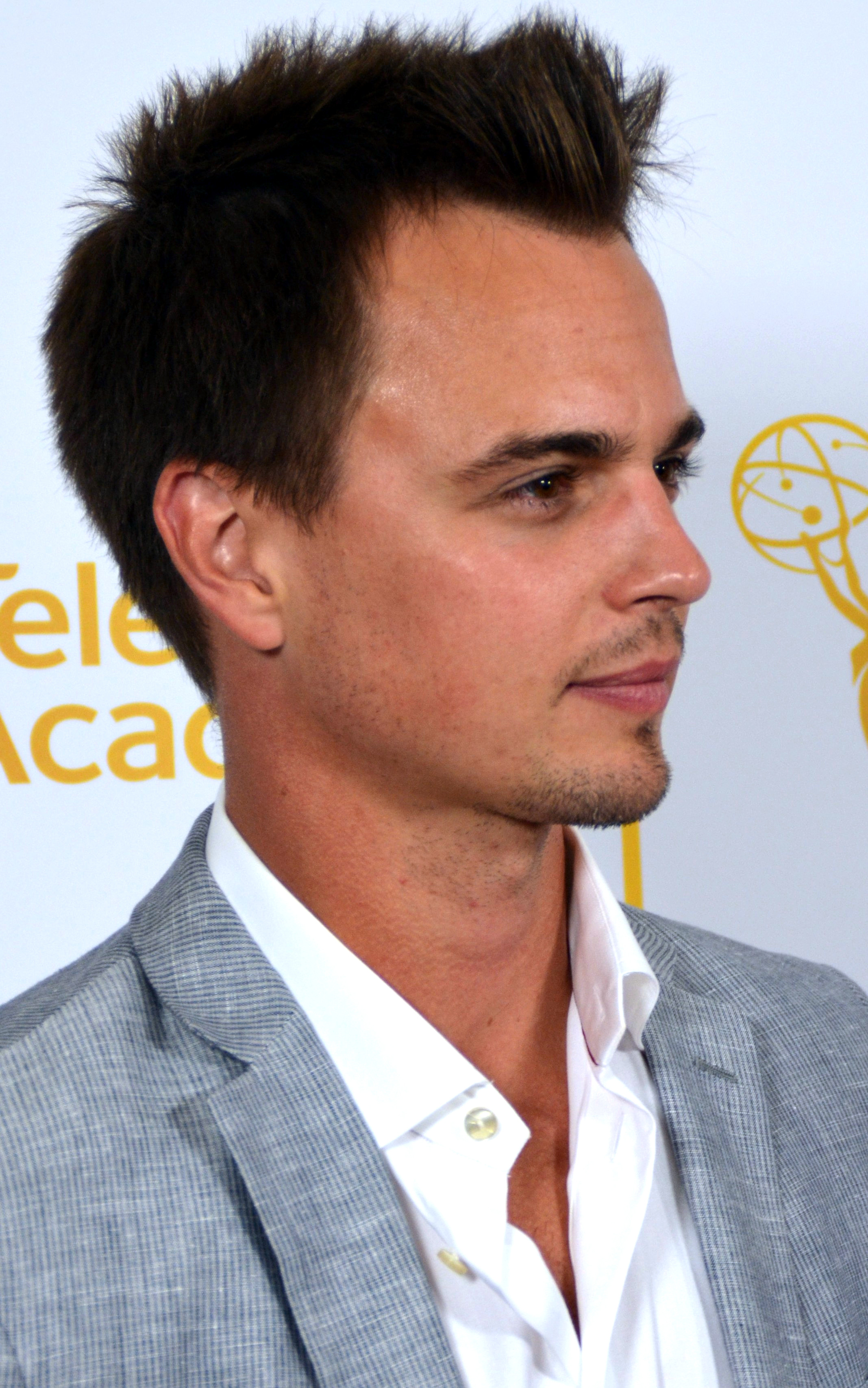
Darin Brooks

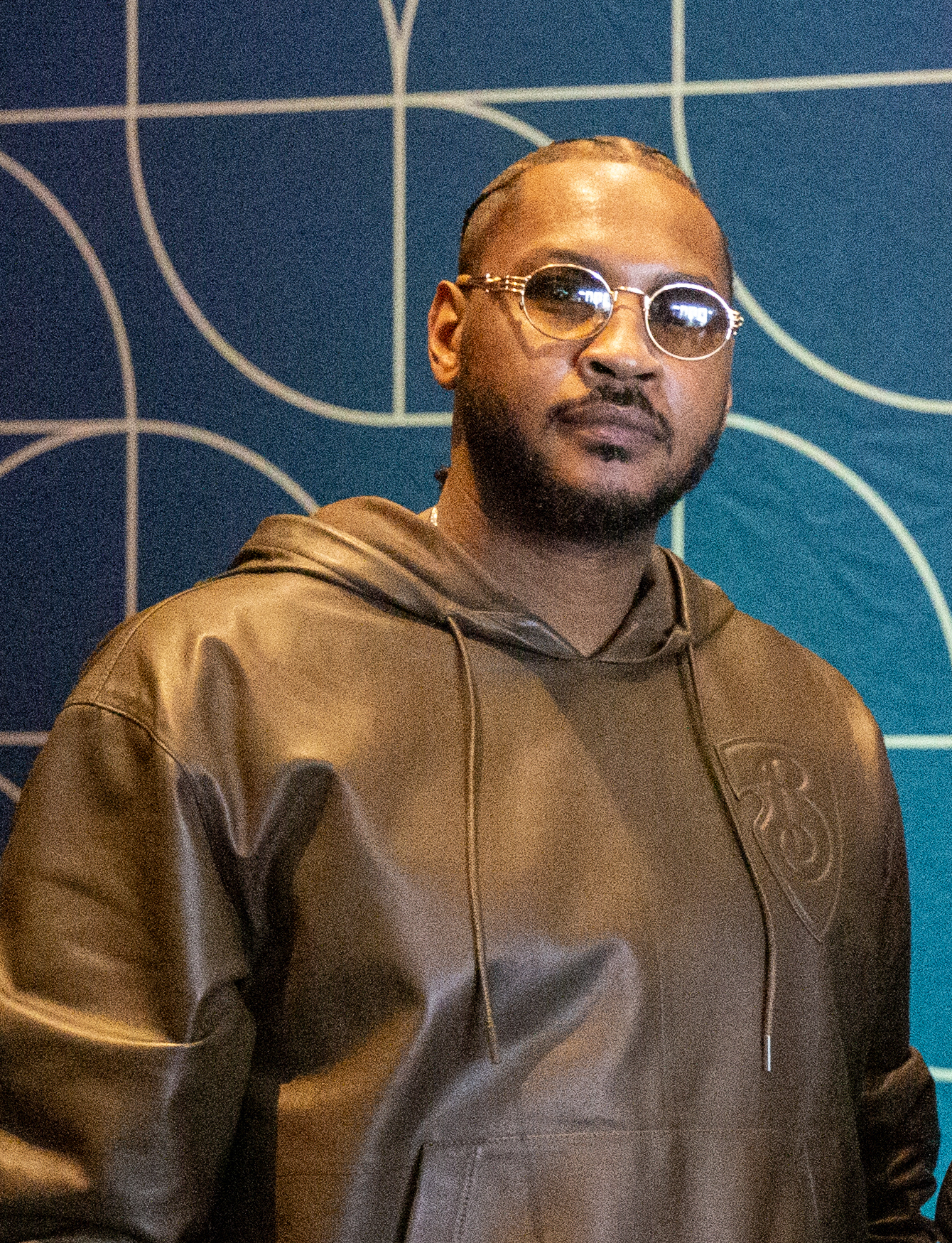
Carmelo Anthony

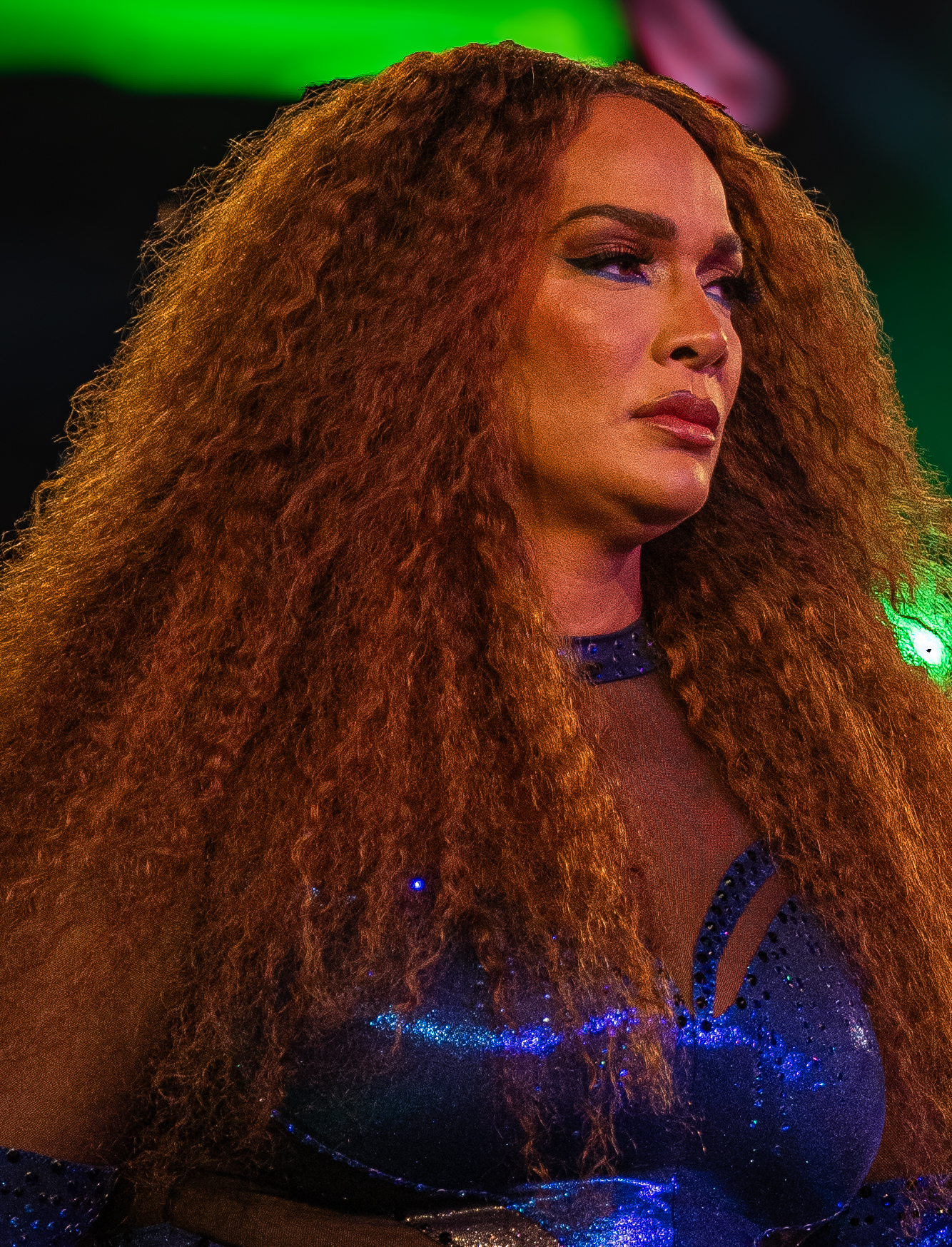
Nia Jax

- May 1
  - David Backes, ice hockey player
  - Kerry Bishé, actress
  - Henry Zebrowski, actor and comedian
- May 2 – Rose Falcon, singer/songwriter
- May 3
  - Tony Barros, basketball player
  - Demetress Bell, football player
  - Angel Blue, opera singer
  - Cheryl Burke, dancer
  - Morgan Kibby, actress and singer/songwriter
- May 4 – Will Pugh, singer, bassist, and frontman for Cartel
- May 6
  - Abu Mansoor Al-Amriki, American-born Somali terrorist (d. 2013)
  - Demarius Bolds, basketball player
- May 7
  - Marvelyn Brown, AIDS activist
  - Marc Burch, soccer player
  - James Loney, baseball player
  - Alex Smith, football player
- May 8
  - Tracy Belton, football player
  - Tyson Mao, television personality, Rubik's Cube speedsolver, and world record holder
  - Marissa Neitling, actress
  - Julia Whelan, actress
- May 9
  - Prince Fielder, baseball player
  - Chase Headley, baseball player
  - Ezra Klein, journalist, blogger and columnist
- May 10 – Brent Bommentre, pair ice dancer
- May 11
  - Naki Akarobettoe, poet
  - Rashad Barksdale, football player
  - John Bowie, football player
  - Holly Bowling, pianist
  - Noah Bryant, shot putter
- May 12
  - Amar Bakshi, artist and founder of Shared Studios and Portals
  - C. J. Brewer, football player
- May 13
  - Kristen Butler, softball player
  - Joe Neguse, politician
- May 14
  - Jessica Boone, actress
  - Mark Zuckerberg, founder and creator of Facebook
- May 15
  - Colin Hufman, Olympic curler
  - Nick Perri, singer/songwriter and guitarist
- May 16
  - Wayne Arnold, basketball player
  - Brian Beaman, Olympic sports shooter
  - Christopher Steven Brown, music executive
  - Mickie Knuckles, wrestler
- May 17
  - Brittany Anjou, musician, composer, pianist, vibraphonist, and producer
  - Jayson Blair, actor
  - Alejandro Edda, Mexican-born actor
- May 19
  - Rishi Bhat, actor and internet entrepreneur
  - Catherine Haena Kim, actress and model
- May 20
  - Naturi Naughton, singer and actress, member of 3LW
  - Kenny Vasoli, singer-songwriter and frontman for The Starting Line, Person L, and Vacationer
- May 21
  - Parag Agrawal, Indian-born software engineer and CEO of Twitter, Inc.
  - Danielle Andersen, poker player
  - Sunkrish Bala, Indian-born actor
  - Jon Beavers, actor and playwright
  - Jarrett Bush, football player
  - Jackson Pearce, novelist
  - Marnie Schulenburg, actress (d. 2022)
  - Gary Woodland, golfer
- May 22
  - Darren Barnett, football player (d. 2021)
  - Dustin Moskovitz, internet entrepreneur, co-founder of Facebook, and co-founder of Asana
- May 23
  - Sam Milby, actor and rock musician
  - Adam Wylie, actor
- May 24
  - Héctor Ambriz, baseball player
  - The Audible Doctor, record producer and rapper
  - Sarah Hagan, actress
- May 25 – Shawne Merriman, football player
- May 26 – Josh Bolton, soccer player
- May 27
  - Blake Ahearn, basketball player and coach
  - Emily Brewer, politician
  - Darin Brooks, actor
- May 29
  - Carmelo Anthony, basketball player
  - Nia Jax, Australian-born wrestler
  - Kaycee Stroh, actress, singer and dancer
- May 30 – DeWanda Wise, actress
- May 31
  - Andrew Bailey, baseball player
  - Nate Robinson, basketball player

=== June ===
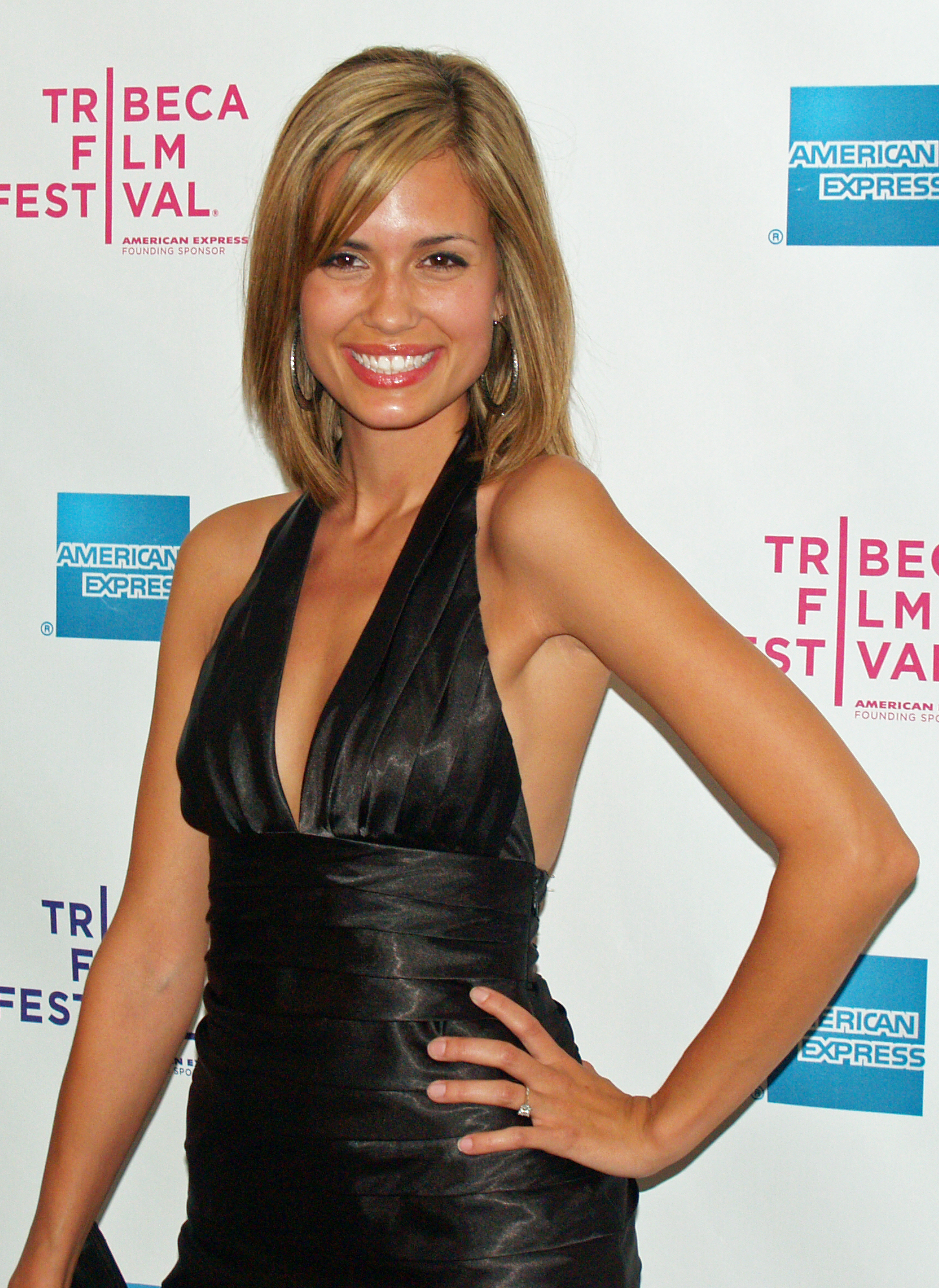
Torrey DeVitto

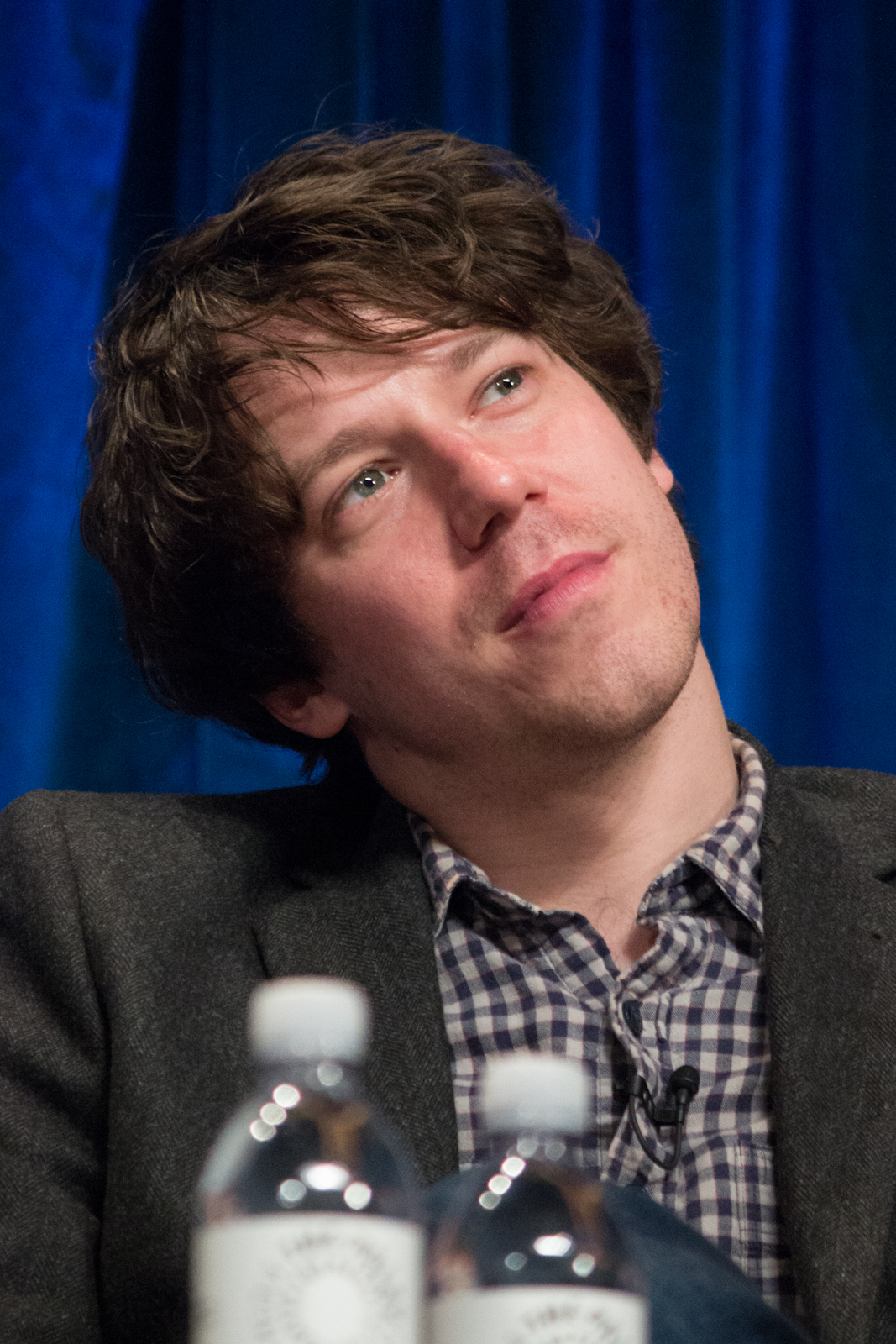
John Gallagher Jr.

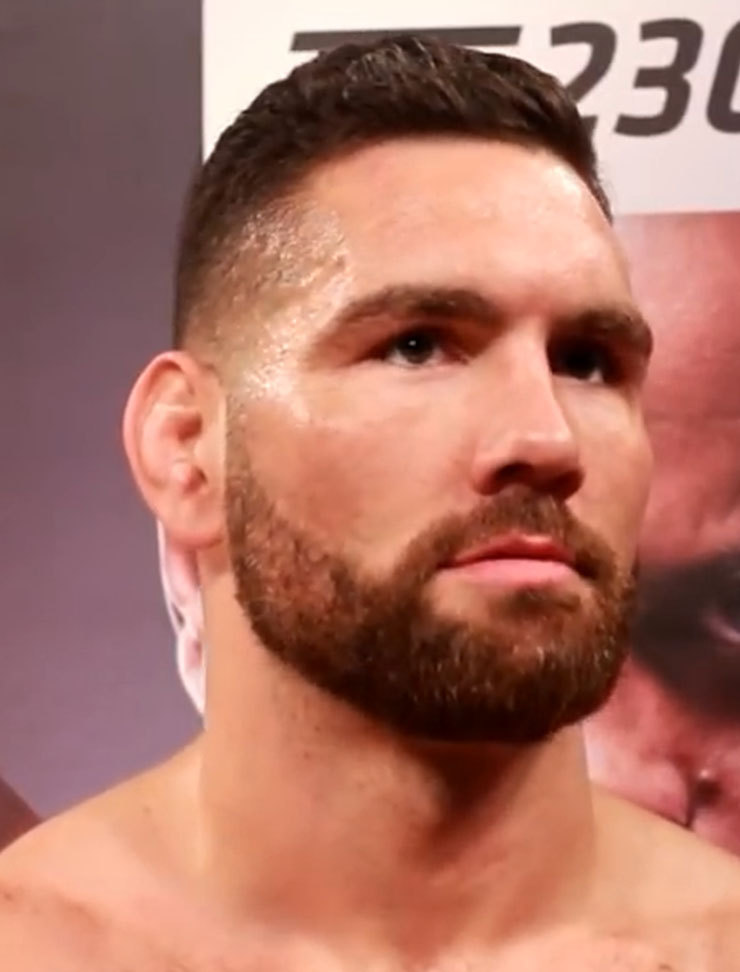
Chris Weidman

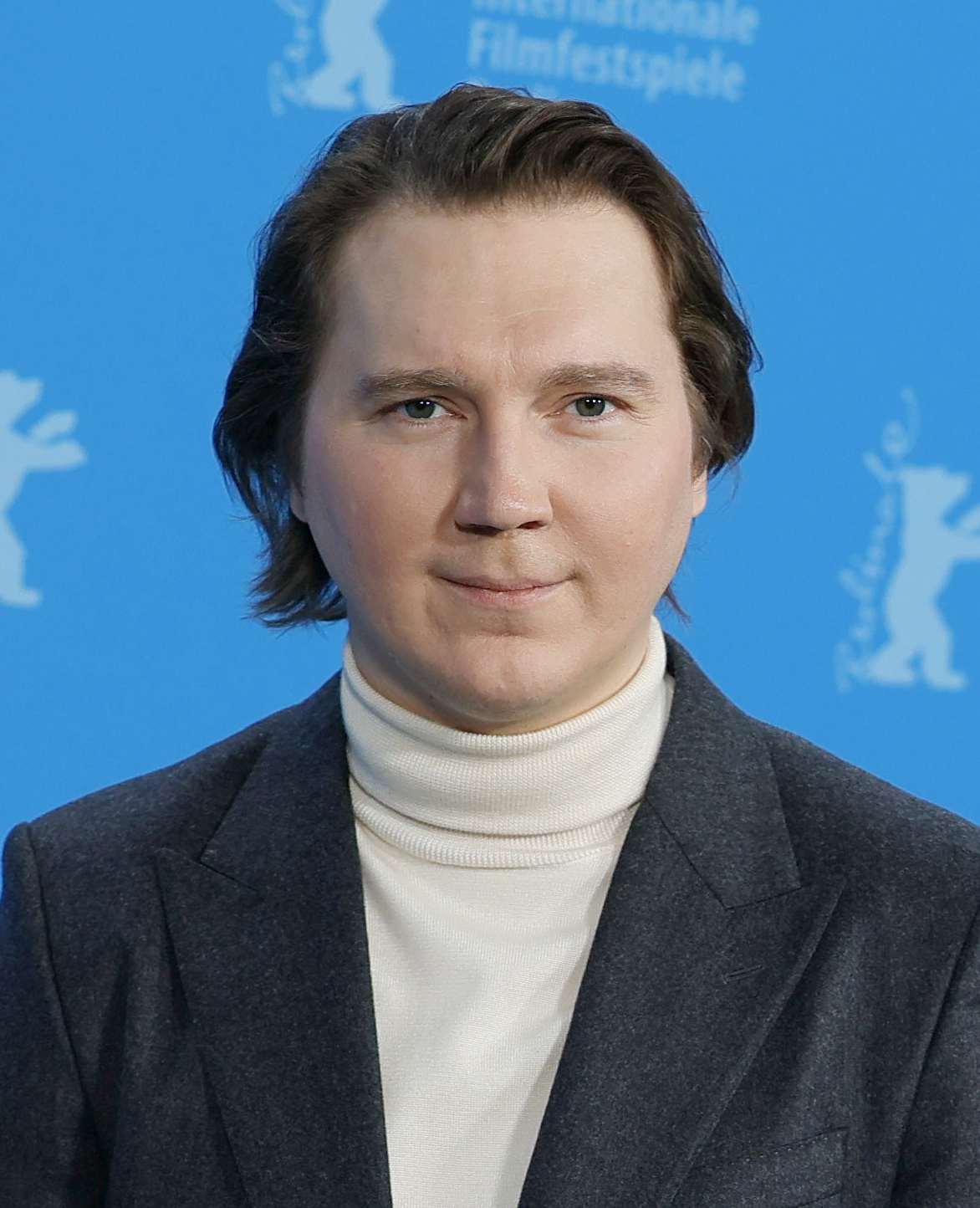
Paul Dano

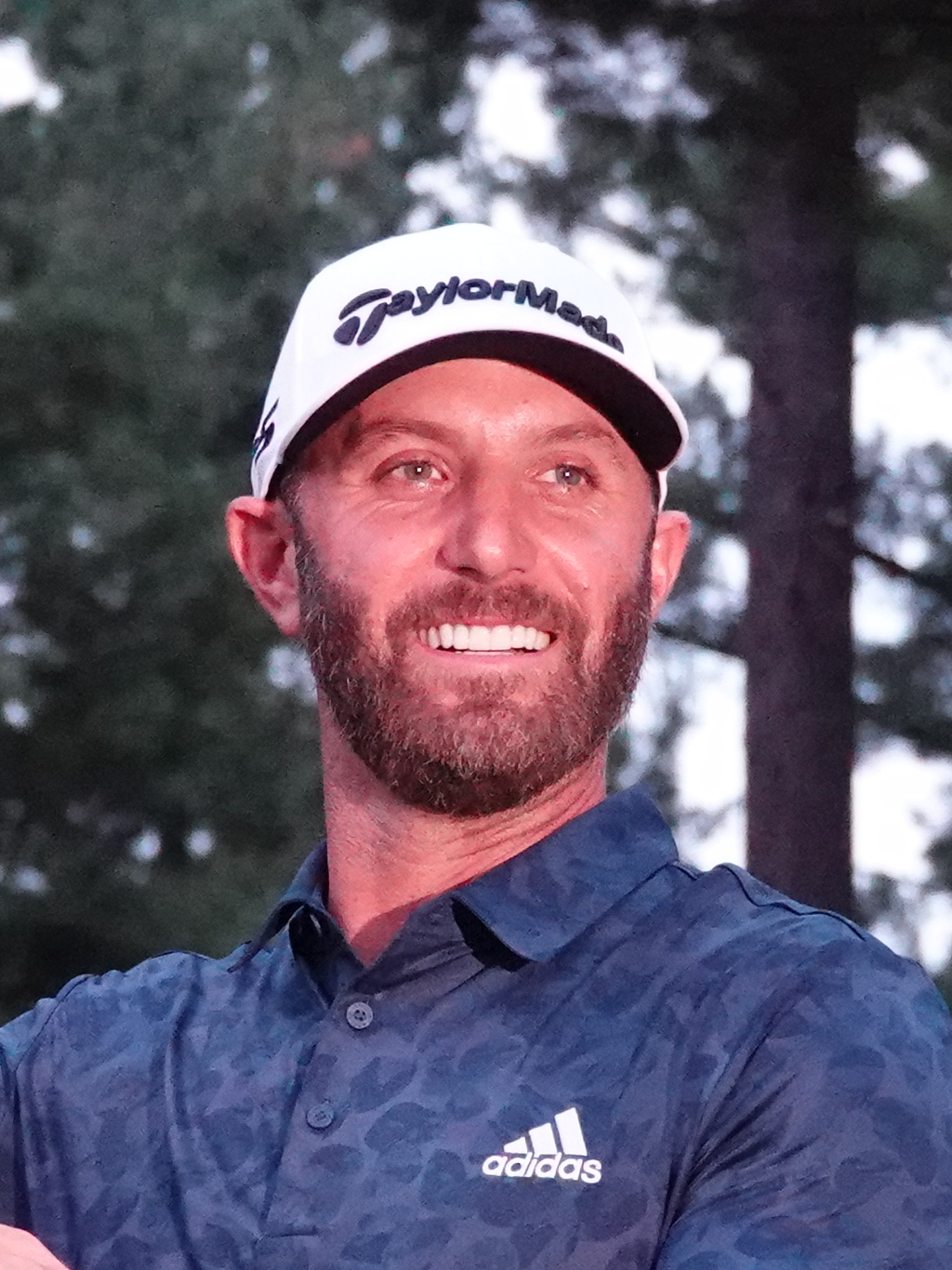
Dustin Johnson

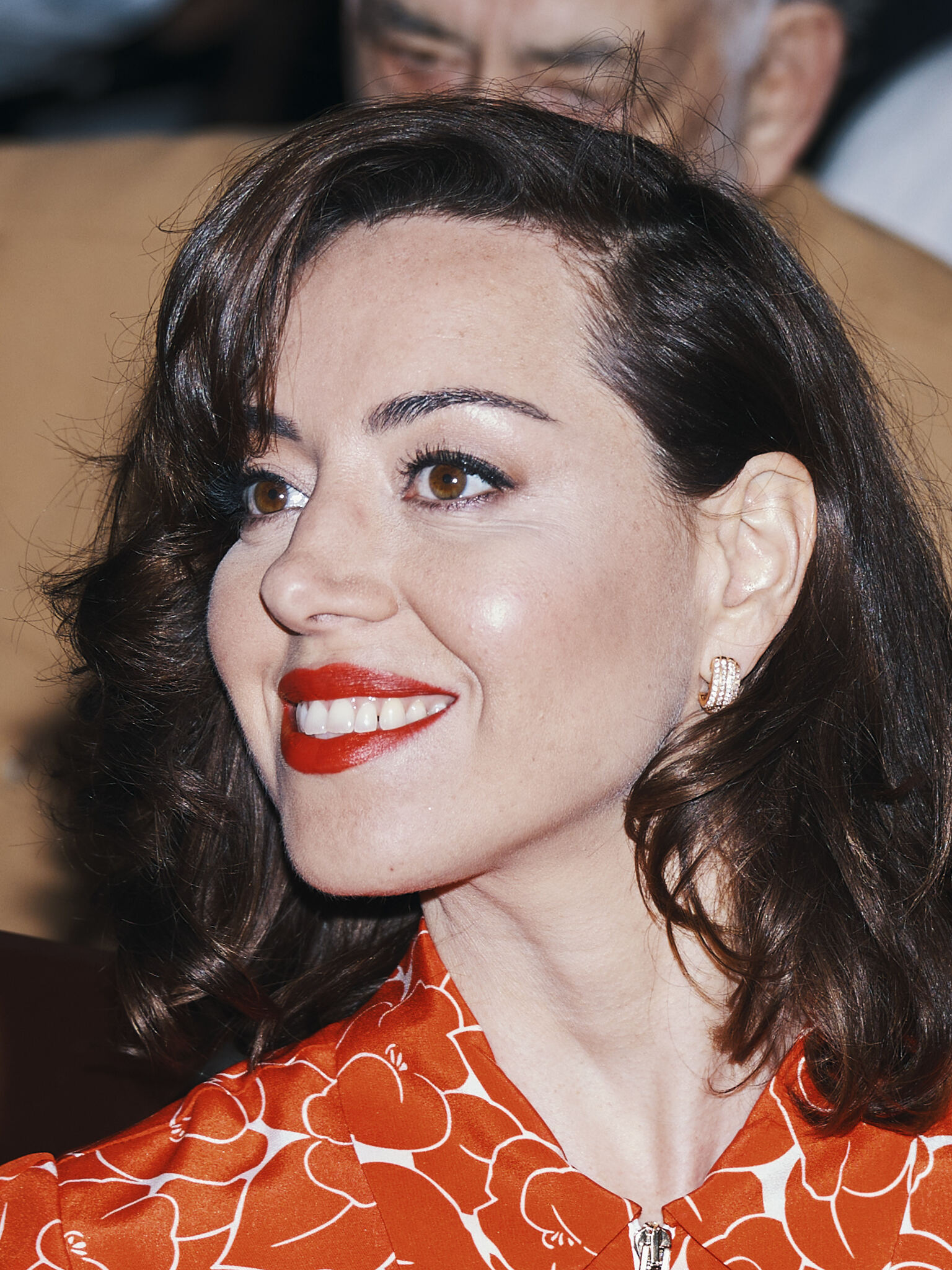
Aubrey Plaza

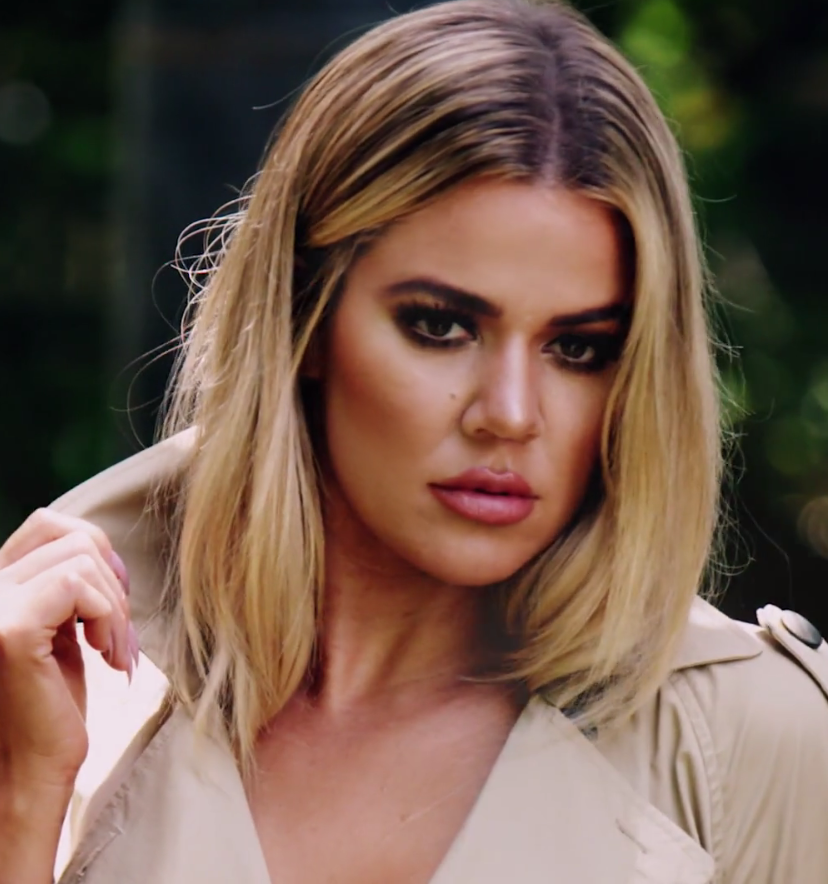
Khloé Kardashian

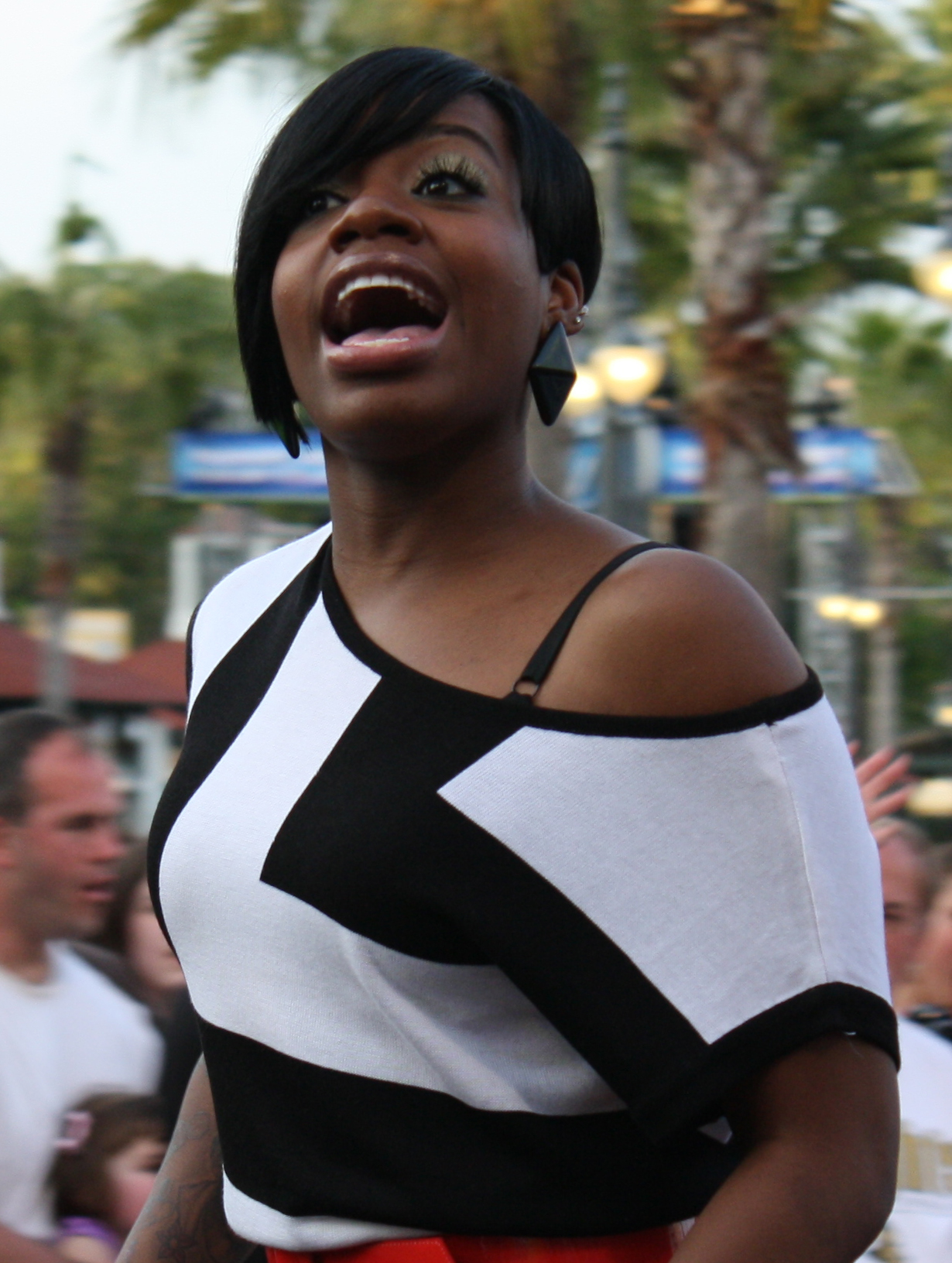
Fantasia

- June 1 – David Neville, Olympic sprinter
- June 2 – Stevie Ryan, YouTube personality, actress and comedian (d. 2017)
- June 4
  - Vinay Bhat, chess grandmanster
  - Jillian Murray, actress
- June 5 – Simon Rich, comic writer
- June 6
  - Curt Anderson, Christian musician and worship leader
  - David Ball, football player
  - Gene Borrello, mafia criminal
  - Jeff Burk, author and editor
  - Shannon Stewart, model
  - Jason Trusnik, football player
- June 7
  - Walt Bell, football player and coach
  - Justin Berg, baseball player
- June 8
  - Jared Allman, actor
  - Todd Boeckman, football player
  - Torrey DeVitto, actress and fashion model
  - Tony Hinchcliffe, comedian
  - Barbara Turner, basketball player and coach
- June 9
  - Kirill Bichutsky, Russian-born photographer, event organizer, and entrepreneur
  - Caroline D'Amore, DJ, model and actress
- June 10
  - Grayson Boucher, streetball player, basketball player, and actor
  - Betsy Sodaro, actress and voice actress
- June 11 – Vincent Bevins, journalist and writer
- June 12 – Donnie Avery, football player
- June 13 – Phillip Van Dyke, actor
- June 14
  - Lorenzo Booker, football player
  - Hydeia Broadbent, HIV/AIDS activist (d. 2024)
- June 15
  - Amber Coffman, singer/songwriter
  - Tim Lincecum, baseball player
- June 16
  - Jahsha Bluntt, basketball player
  - Jonathan Broxton, baseball player
- June 17
  - John Gallagher Jr., actor, singer and dancer
  - Chris Weidman, mixed martial artist
- June 18
  - Angry Joe, YouTuber
  - Ian Jones-Quartey, animator and voice actor
- June 19 – Paul Dano, actor and producer
- June 20 – Hassan Adams, basketball player
- June 21 – Jessica White, model
- June 22
  - Allen Barbre, football player
  - Patrick B. Burke, politician
  - Dustin Johnson, golfer
  - Matt Lauria, actor
- June 24
  - Lucien Dodge, voice actor
  - JJ Redick, basketball player
- June 25
  - Aundrae Allison, football player
  - Bryan Avila, politician
  - Lauren Bush, model and producer, co-founder of FEED Projects, and daughter of George W. Bush
  - Natalie Sims, Christian hip hop singer/songwriter
- June 26
  - John Bucy III, politician
  - Raymond Felton, basketball player
  - Aubrey Plaza, actress and comedian
  - Deron Williams, basketball player
  - Eddie Wineland, mixed martial artist
- June 27
  - Khloé Kardashian, television personality
  - Conor Lamb, politician
  - Antoine Dodson, internet personality
- June 28
  - Gerald Alexander, football player and coach
  - Eric Friedman, heavy metal musician and songwriter
- June 29
  - Kathryn Augustyn, rugby player
  - Blake Richardson, drummer for Between the Buried and Me
- June 30
  - Miles Austin, football player and coach
  - Fantasia, R&B singer, American Idol winner
  - Grant Harvey, actor

=== July ===
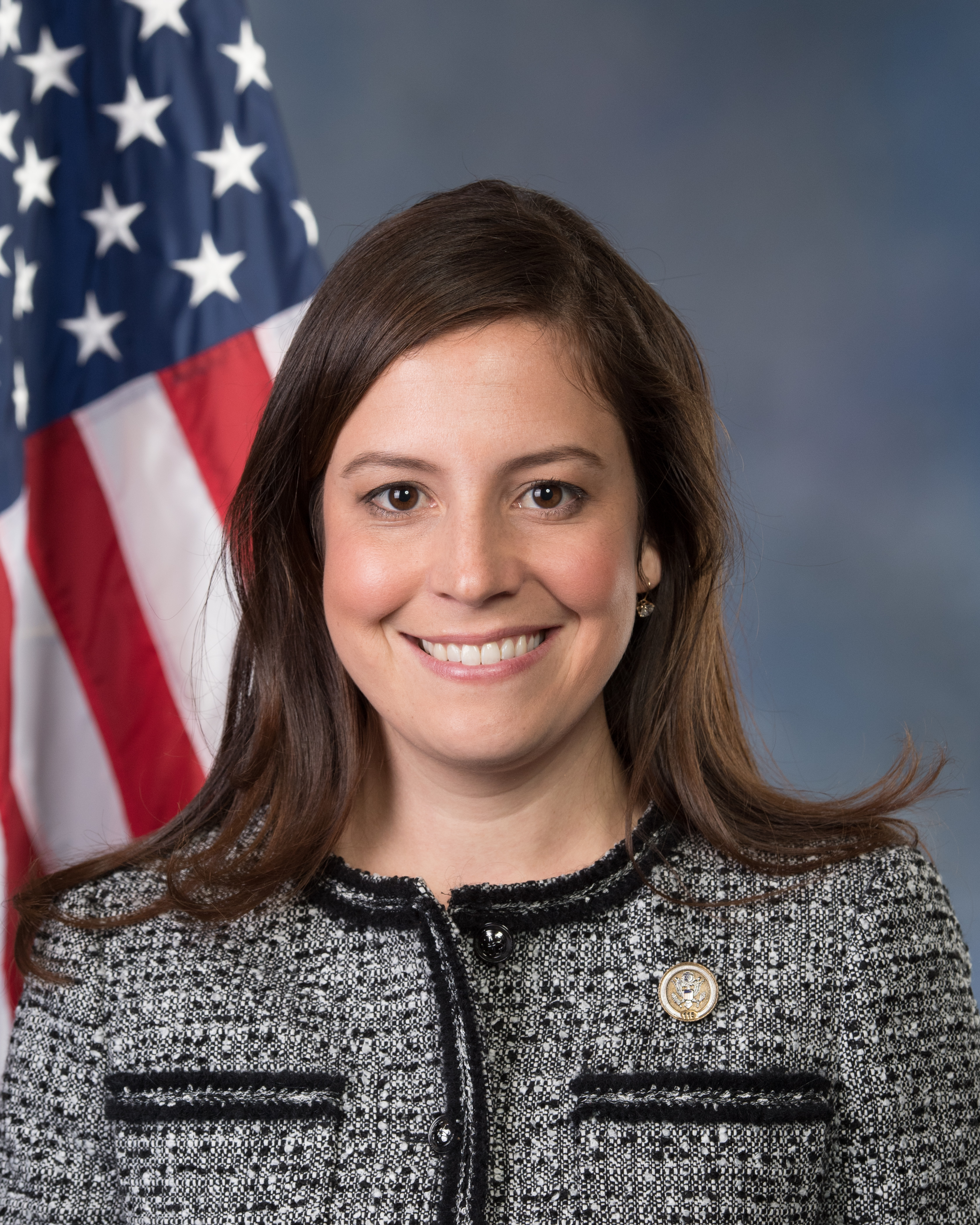
Elise Stefanik

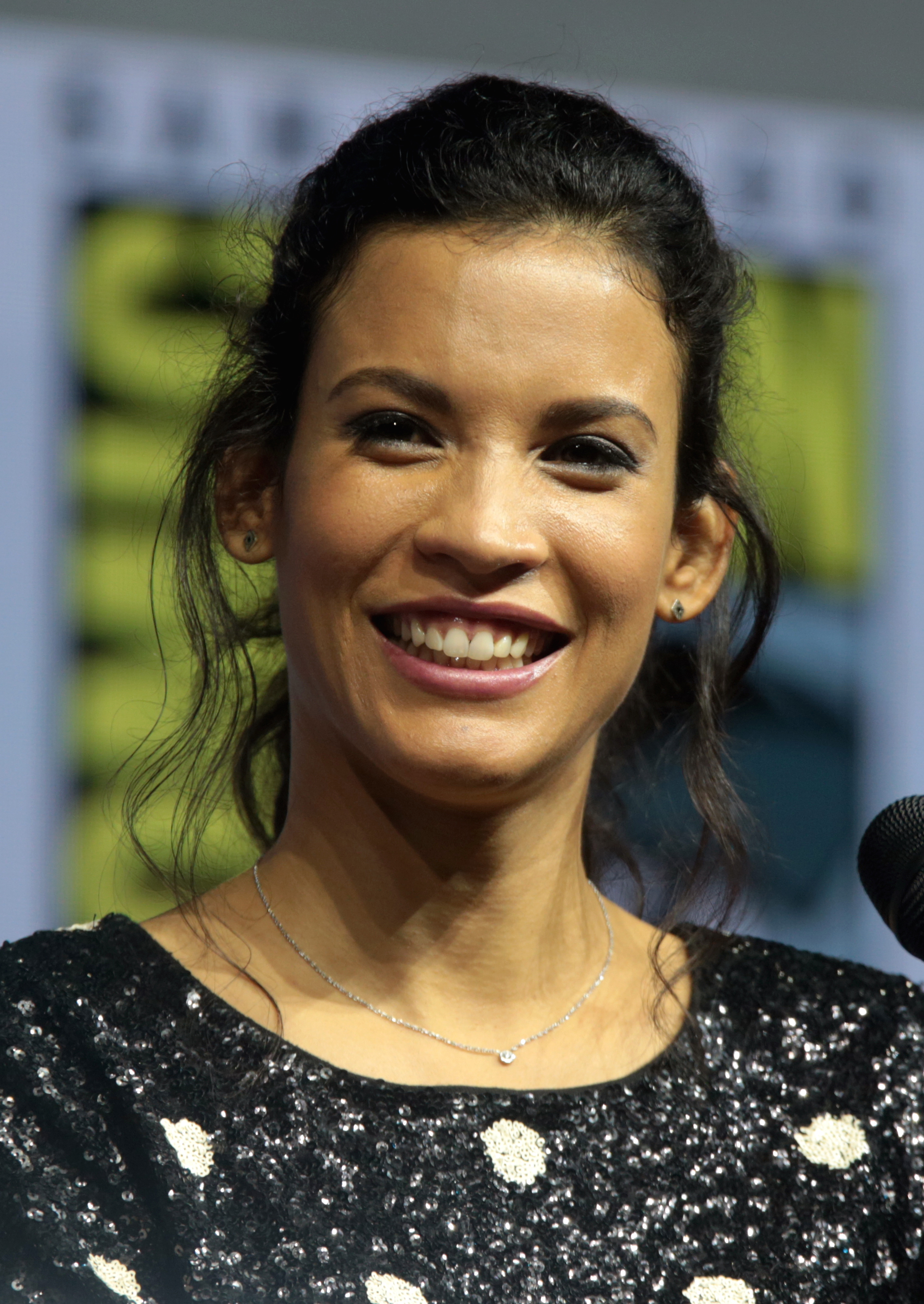
Danay García

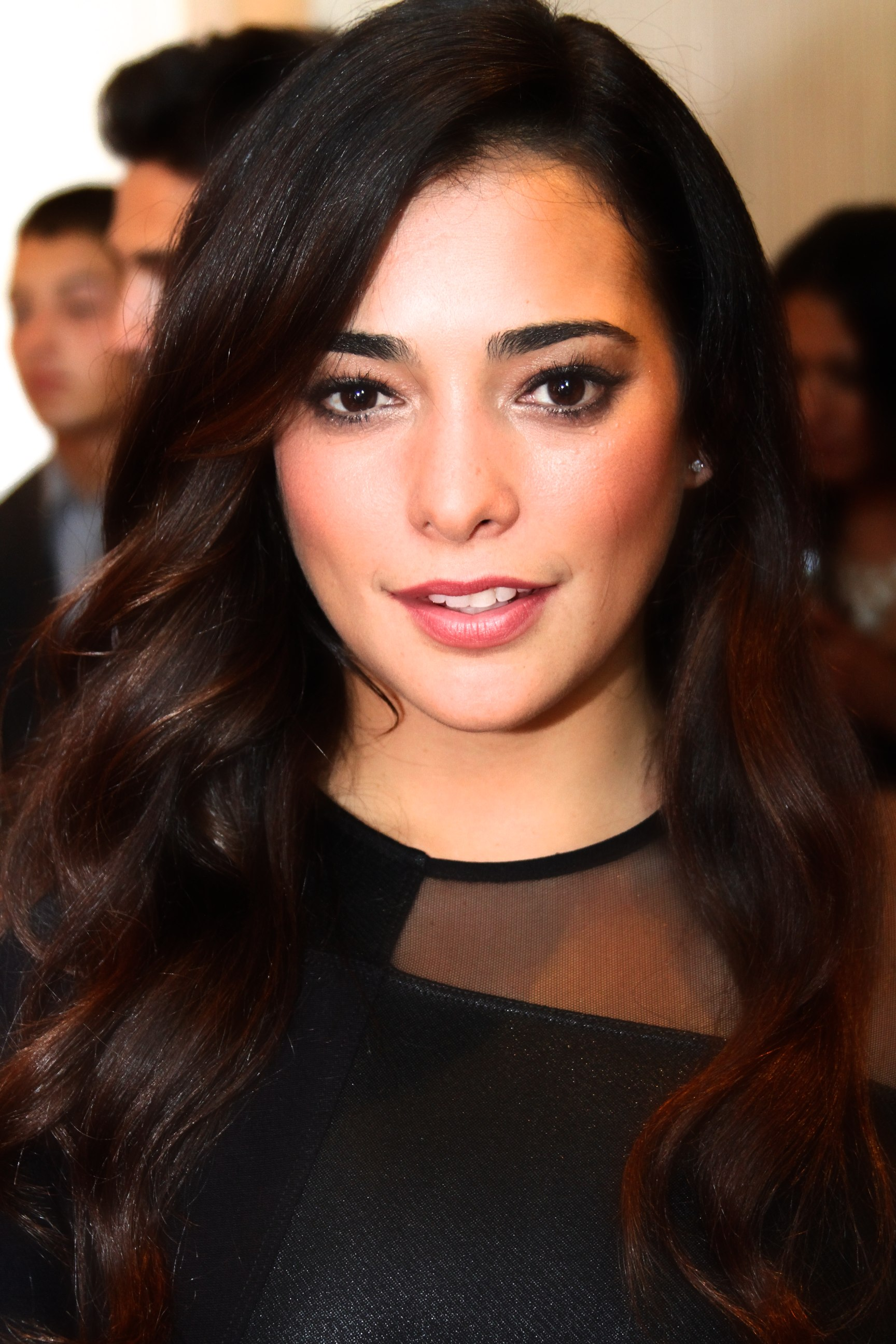
Natalie Martinez

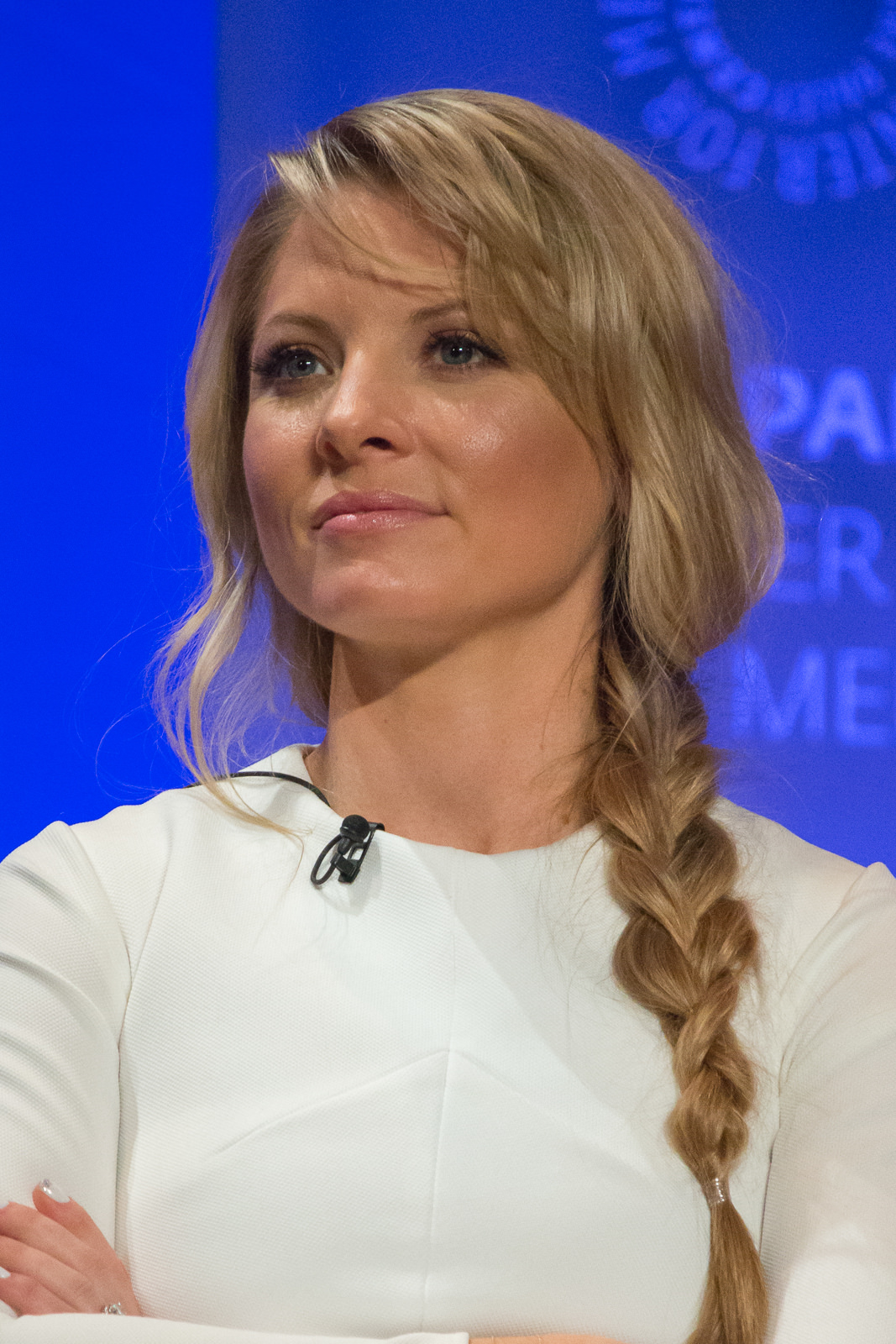
Kaitlin Doubleday

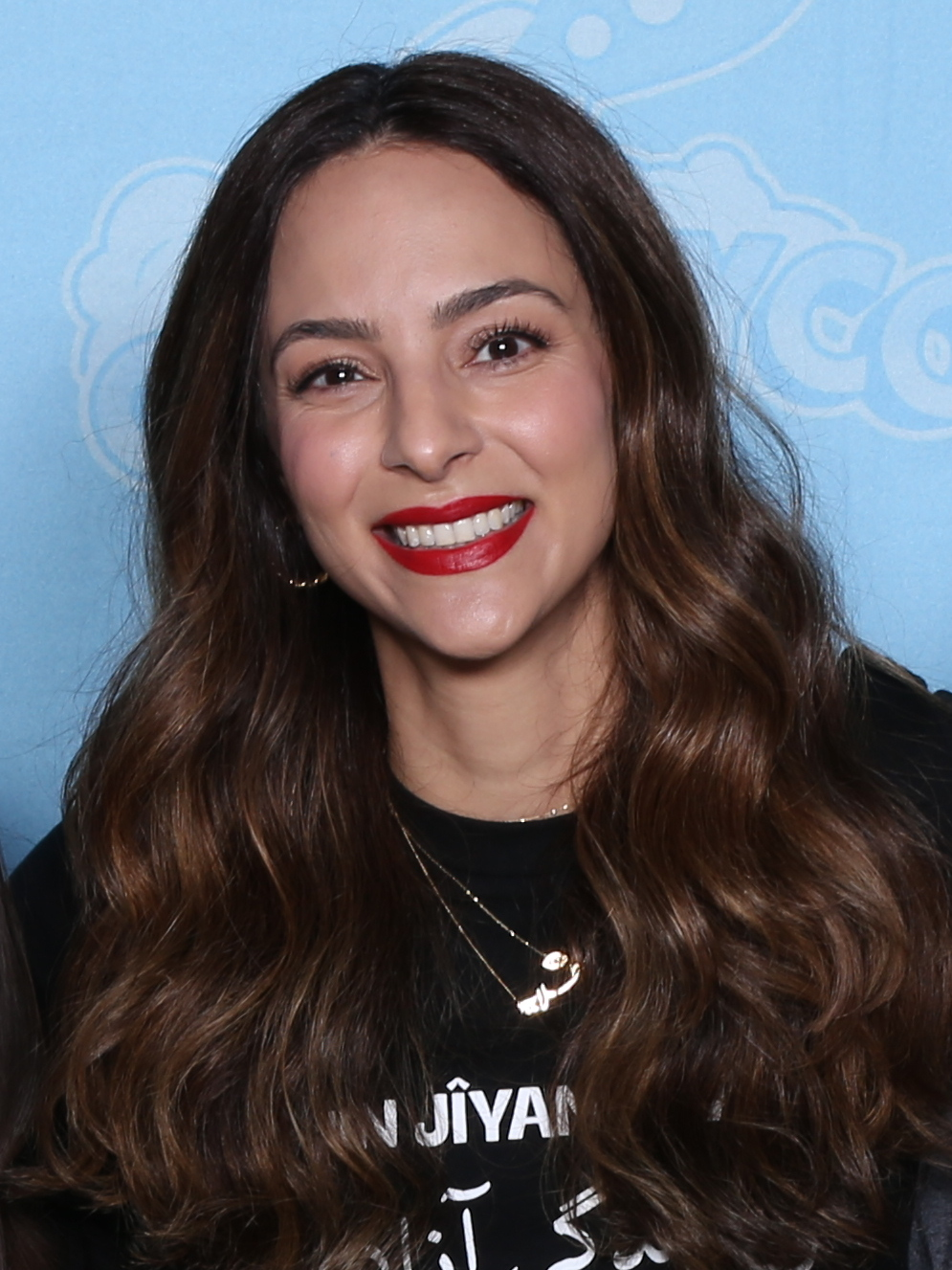
Tala Ashe

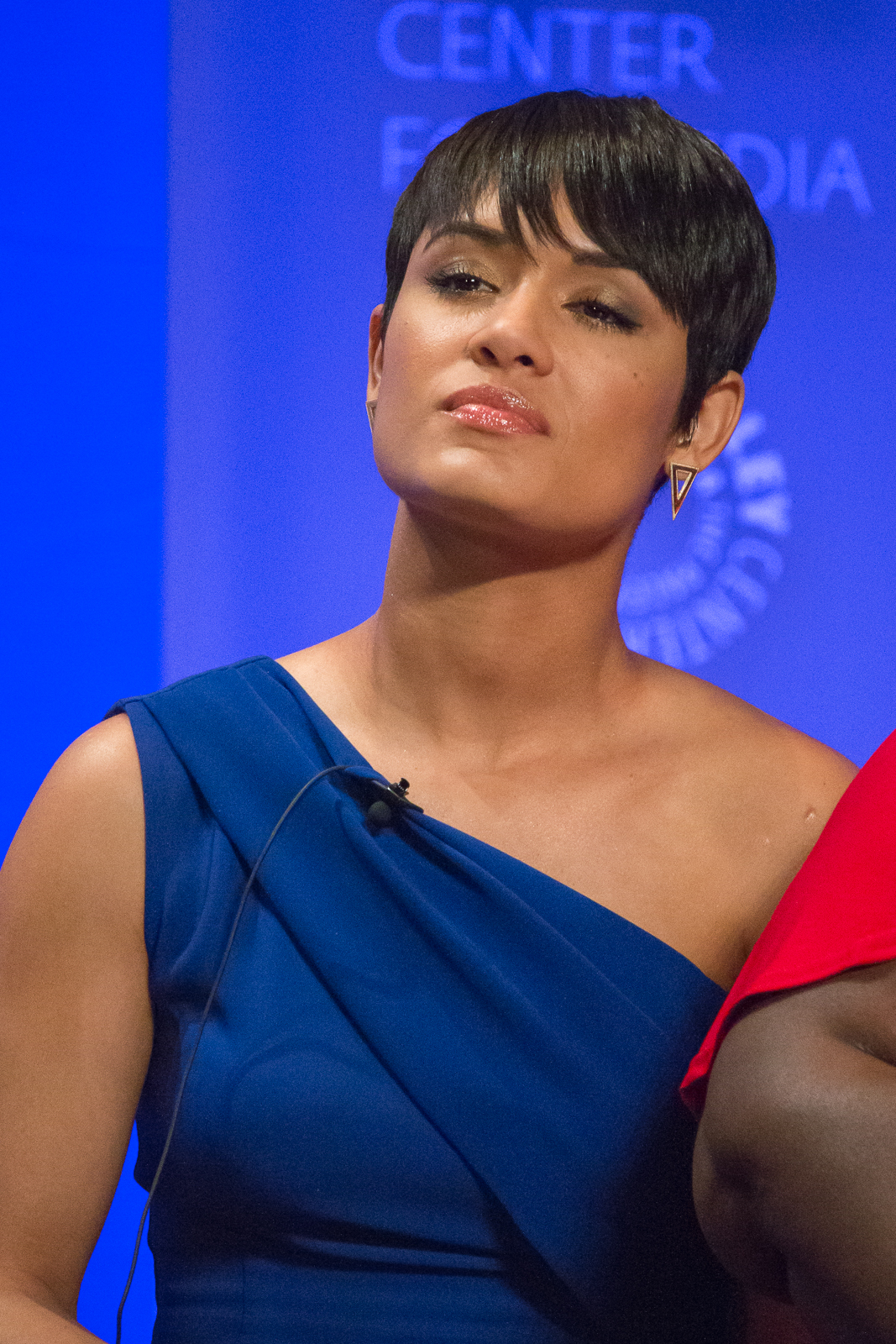
Grace Gealey

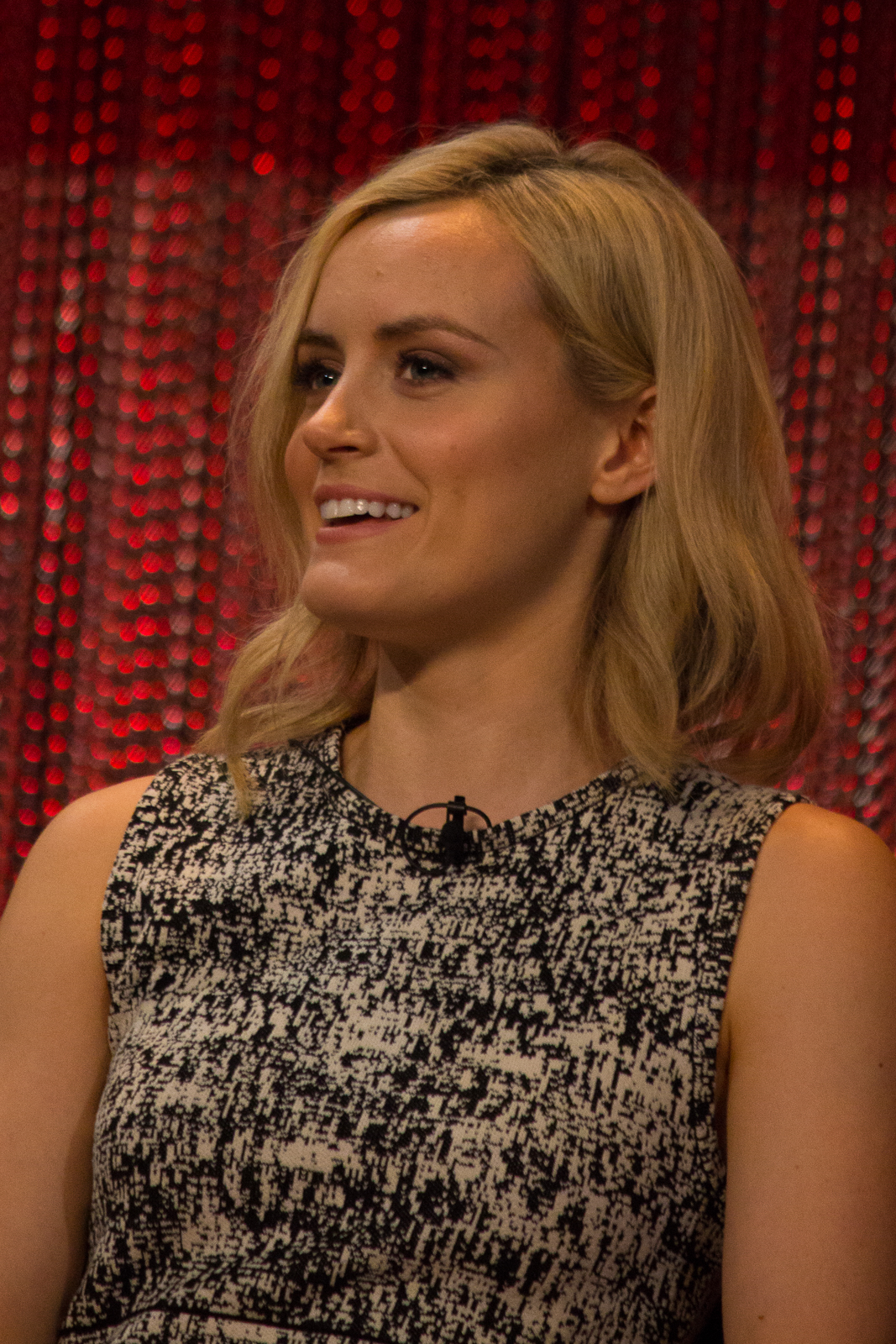
Taylor Schilling

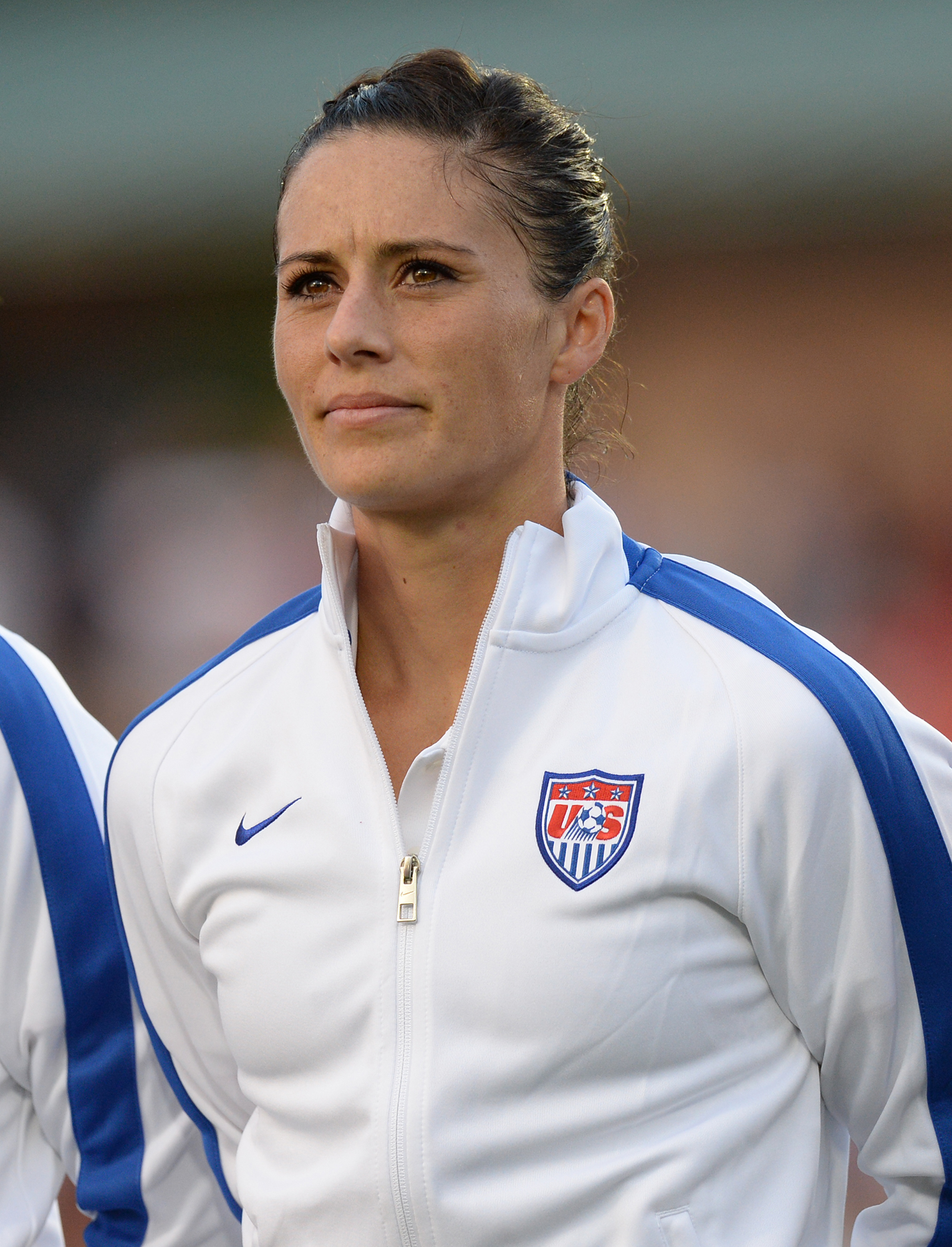
Ali Krieger

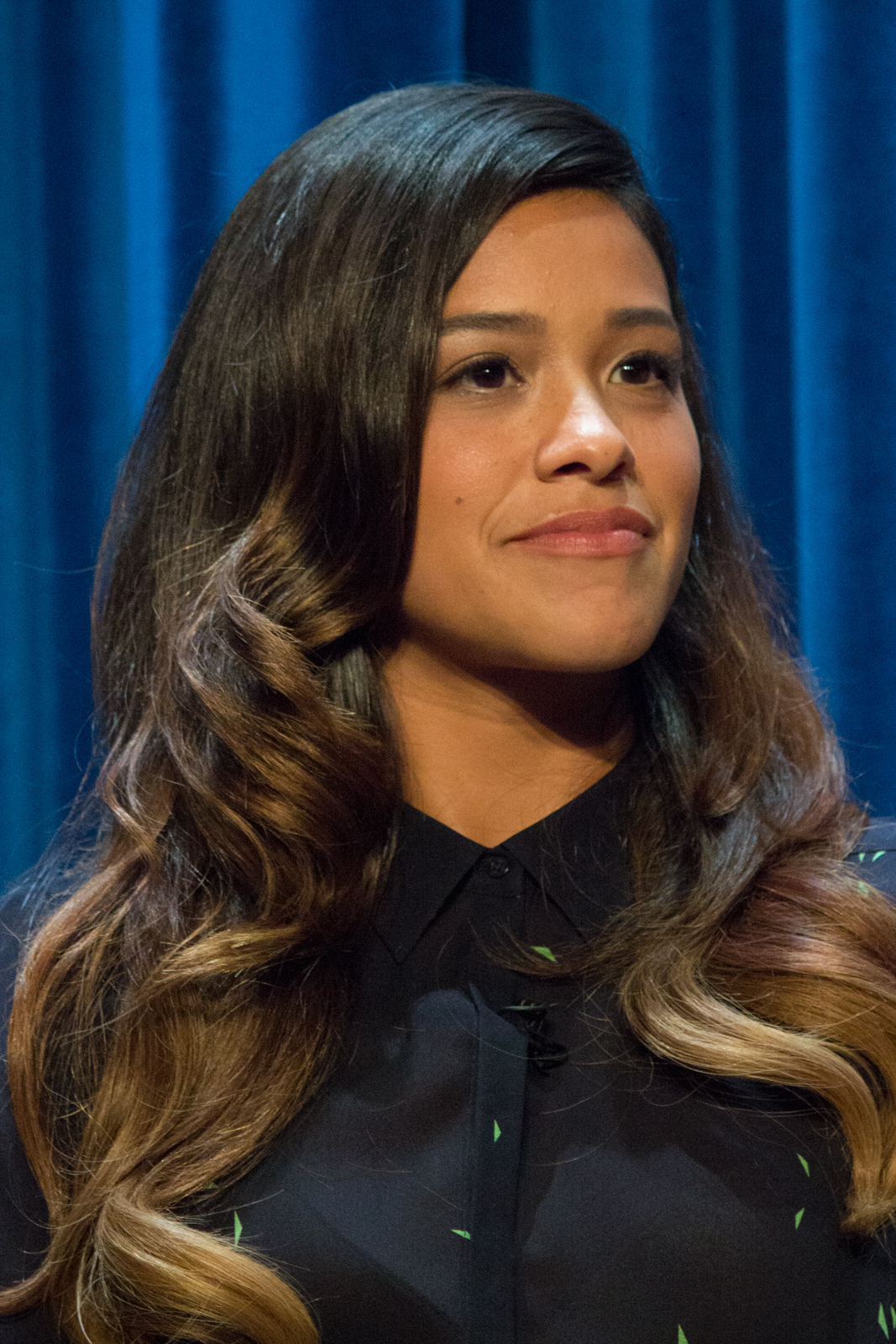
Gina Rodriguez

- July 1 – Jason Reeves, folk singer/songwriter
- July 2
  - Aaron Bernstine, politician
  - Vanessa Lee Chester, actress
  - Ryan Serhant, entrepreneur, investor, real estate broker, and television personality
  - Elise Stefanik, politician
  - Johnny Weir, Olympic figure skater, fashion designer, and television commentator
- July 3
  - DaBryan Blanton, sprinter
  - Manny Lawson, football player
- July 4
  - Adarsh Alphons, Indian-born entrepreneur, philanthropist, artist, and founder of ProjectArt
  - Gina Glocksen, singer
- July 5
  - Bill Barnwell, sportswriter
  - Danay García, Cuban-born actress
  - AJ Gil, singer
  - Zack Miller, golfer
- July 7
  - Jorge Andres, Peruvian-born sportscaster
  - Ross Malinger, actor
- July 8
  - Eric Branscum, screenwriter
  - Brendan Burke, sportscaster
  - Alexis Dziena, actress
- July 9
  - Andrew Breiner, football player and coach
  - Hanna R. Hall, actress
  - Sarah Lacina, television personality
- July 10
  - Aviva Baumann, actress
  - Tim Blue, basketball player
- July 11
  - Tanith Belbin White, Canadian-born Olympic figure skater
  - Joe Pavelski, hockey player
- July 12
  - Erica Buettner, indie folk singer/songwriter
  - Matt Cook, actor
  - Amanda Hocking, novelist
  - Natalie Martinez, actress and model
- July 14
  - Erica Blasberg, golfer (d. 2010)
  - Ashlé Dawson, dancer
  - Alex Ross Perry, director, screenwriter, and actor
- July 15 – Noah Bendix-Balgley, violinist
- July 17
  - Melissa Bachman, huntress, producer, and host
  - Josh Barro, journalist
  - Katie Uhlaender, Olympic skeleton racer
- July 18
  - Ben Askren, mixed martial artist
  - Allen Craig, baseball player
- July 19
  - Kaitlin Doubleday, actress
- July 21 – Paul Davis, basketball player
- July 22 – Jamilah Lemieux, writer
- July 23
  - James Holzhauer, game show champion
  - Brandon Roy, basketball player
  - Celeste Thorson, actress and model
- July 24
  - Tala Ashe, Iranian-born actress
  - Desmond Bishop, football player
  - Kristen Dowling, basketball coach
- July 26
  - Emily Axford, actress, writer, and producer
  - Mike Beltran, politician
  - Grace Byers, actress
  - Archie Eversole, rapper (d. 2022)
- July 27
  - Andrew Anglin, white supremacist
  - Antoine Bethea, football player
  - Lindsay Burdge, actress and producer
  - Max Scherzer, baseball player
  - Taylor Schilling, actress
- July 28
  - DeMeco Ryans, football player and coach
  - Ali Krieger, soccer player
  - Zach Parise, ice hockey player
  - John David Washington, football player, actor and producer
- July 29
  - Toby Basner, MLB umpire
  - Chad Billingsley, baseball player
  - J. Madison Wright Morris, actress (d. 2006)
- July 30
  - Gina Rodriguez, actress and producer
  - Gabrielle Christian, actress
- July 31
  - Joseph Benavidez, mixed martial artist
  - DJ B-Do, rapper and record producer
  - Uriah Hall, martial artist

=== August ===
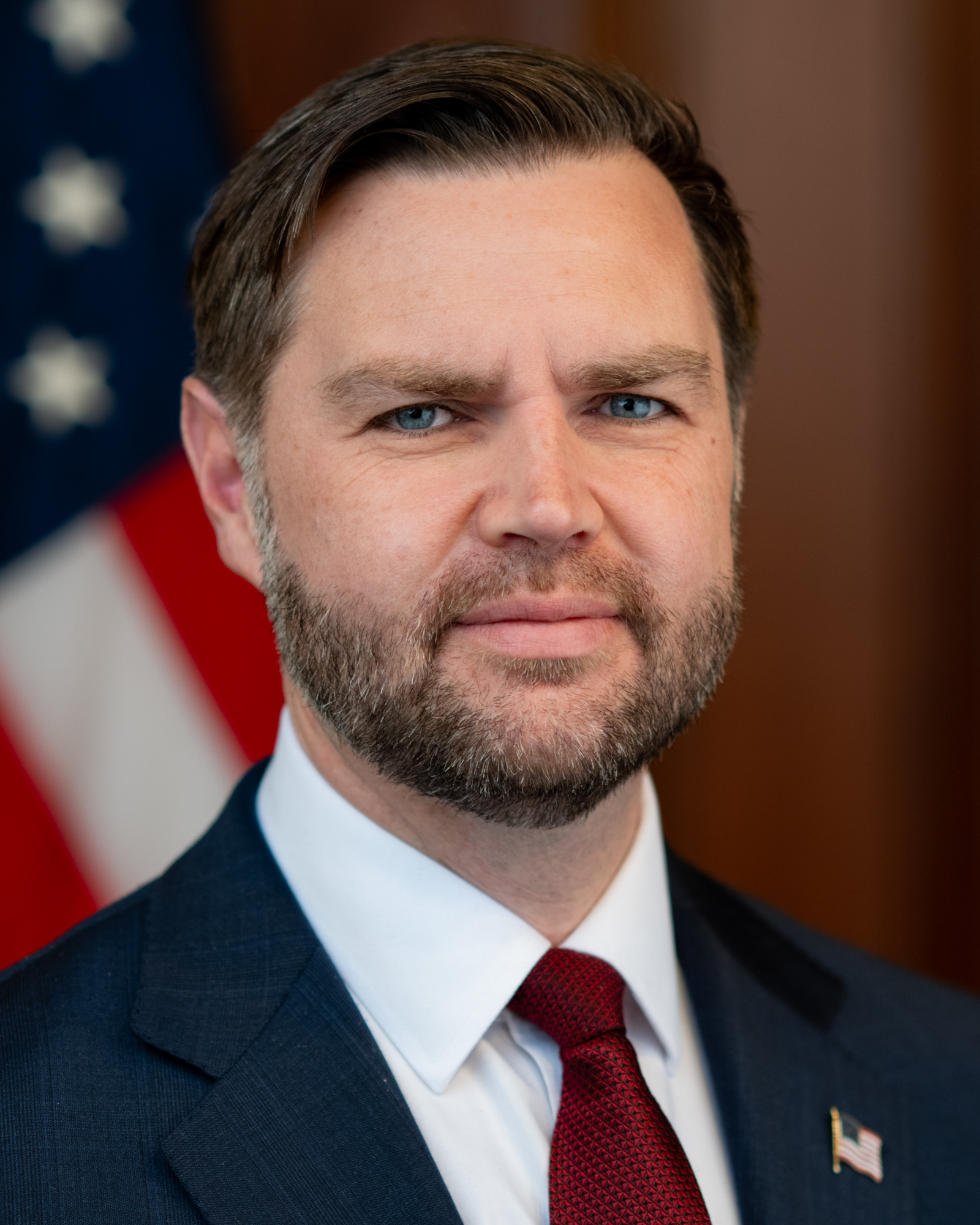
JD Vance

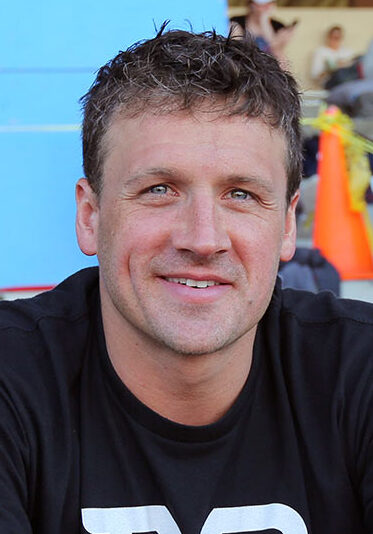
Ryan Lochte

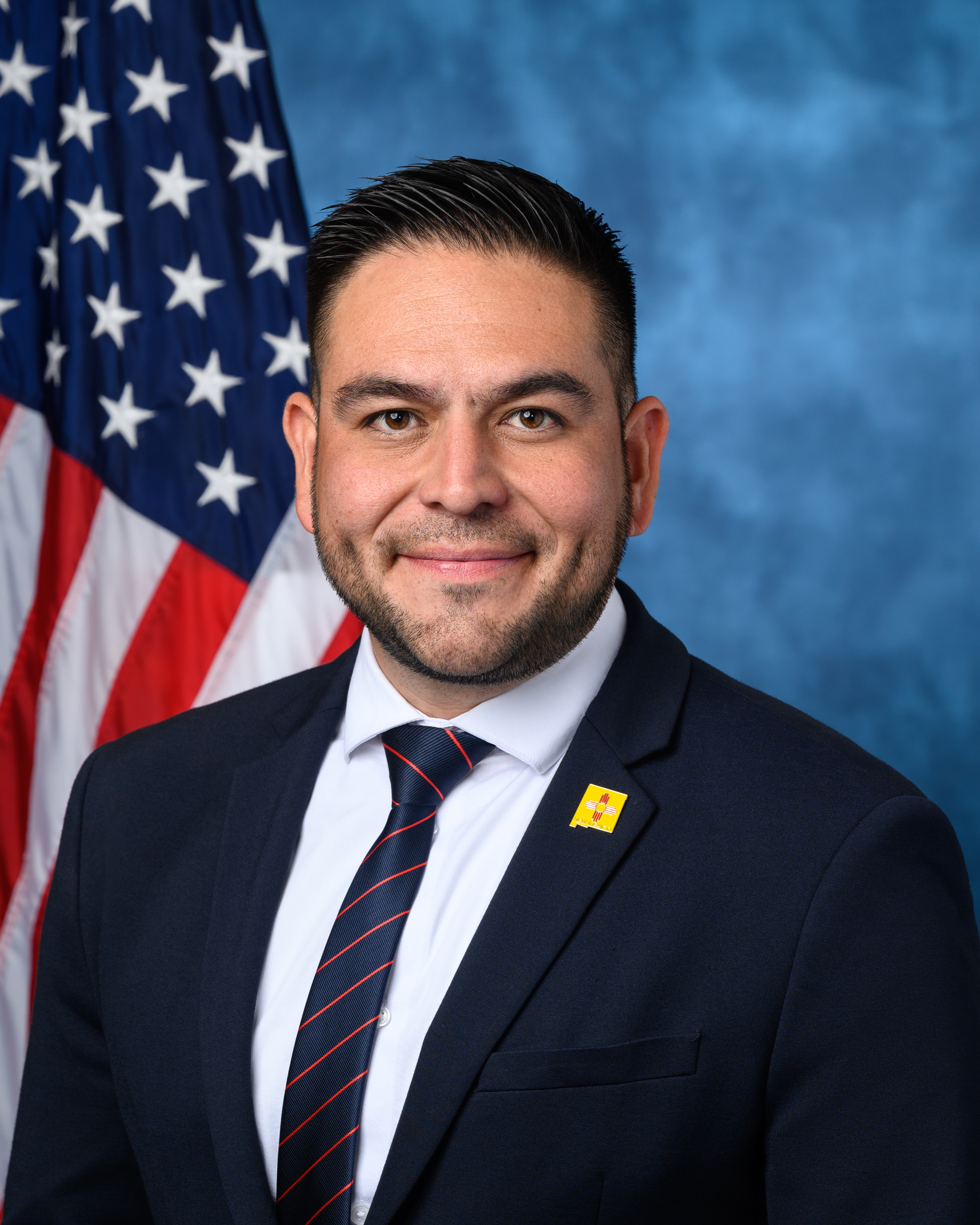
Gabe Vasquez

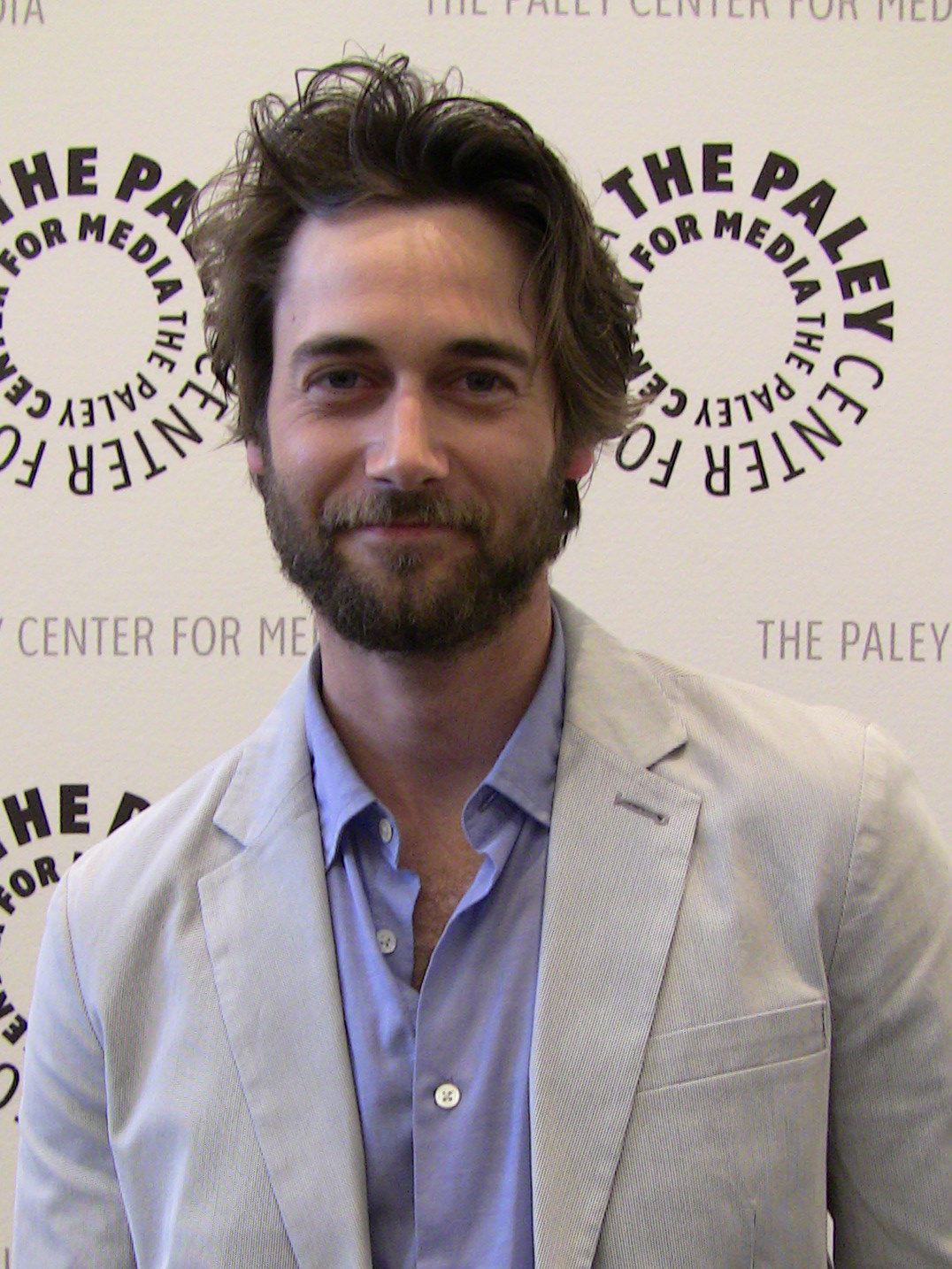
Ryan Eggold

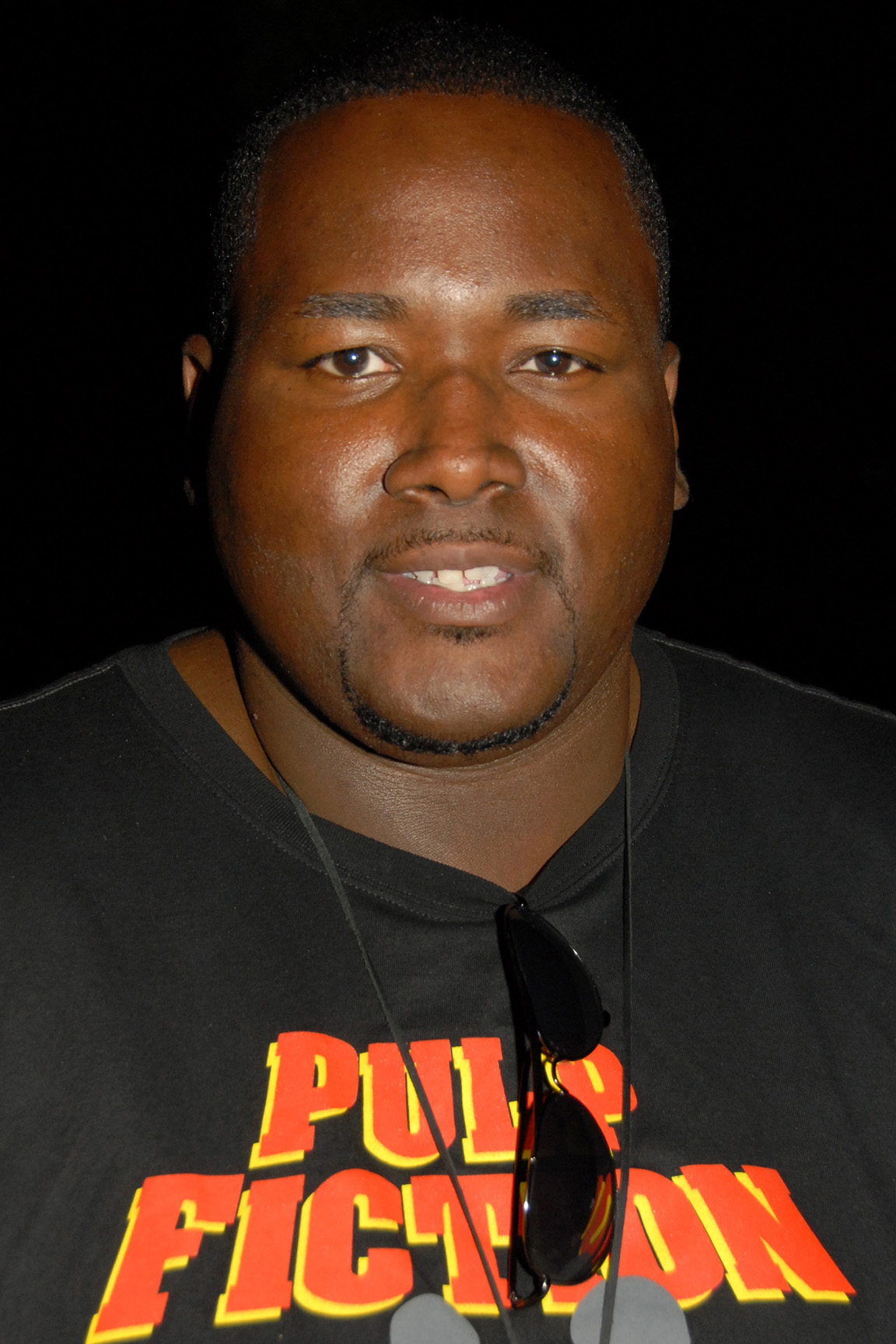
Quinton Aaron

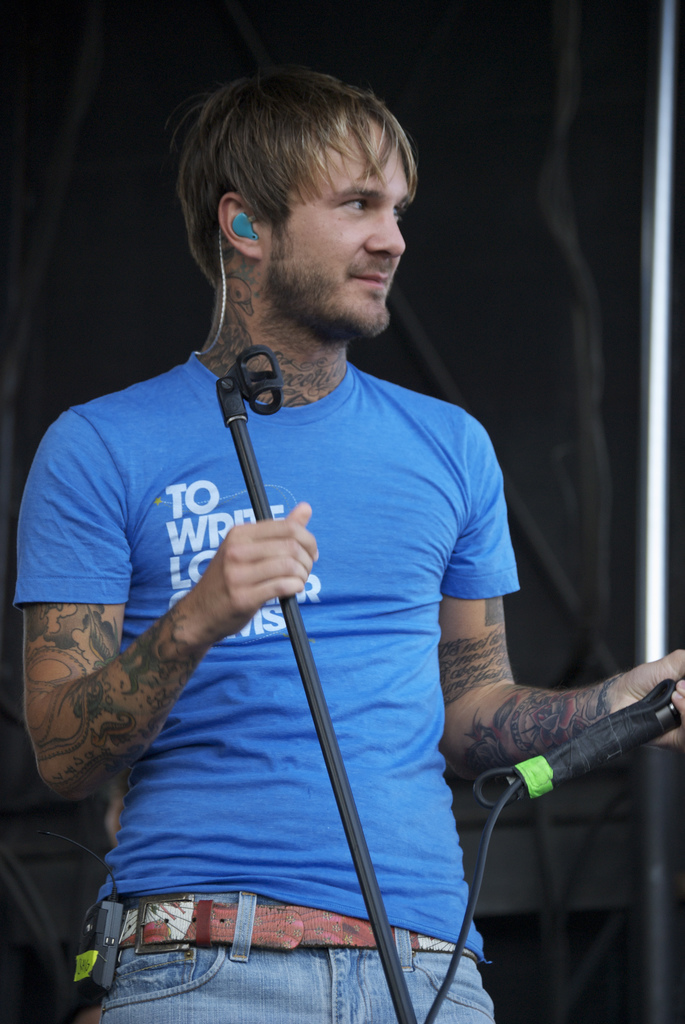
Craig Owens

- August 1 – Danny Tidwell, dancer (d. 2020)
- August 2
  - Brandon Browner, football player
  - Britt Nicole, Christian singer/songwriter
  - JD Vance, political commentator, politician, venture capitalist, author, 50th vice president of the United States since 2025
- August 3
  - Carah Faye Charnow, singer for Shiny Toy Guns
  - Jon Foster, actor and musician
  - Sarah Lane, ballerina
  - Ryan Lochte, Olympic swimmer
  - Gabe Vasquez, politician
- August 4
  - Vandit Bhatt, actor
  - Nick Lazzarini, dancer
- August 5 – Rashaun Broadus, American-born Albanian basketball player
- August 6 – Kelly Williams Brown, writer and author
- August 7
  - Omar Espinosa, guitarist
  - Joseph Trapanese, composer and music producer
- August 8 – Joe Ayoob, football player
- August 10
  - Ryan Eggold, actor
  - Ja'Tovia Gary, artist and filmmaker
- August 11 – Melky Cabrera, baseball player
- August 13
  - Rory Bosio, trail runner
  - Eme Ikwuakor, actor
- August 14
  - Brylan Van Artsdalen, mixed martial artist
  - Nevin Ashley, baseball player
  - Clay Buchholz, baseball player
- August 15
  - Quinton Aaron, actor
  - Tyson Brummett, baseball player (d. 2020)
  - Ayọ Tometi, activist and co-founder of Black Lives Matter
- August 16
  - Magno, wrestler
  - Isaiah Stanback, football player
- August 17
  - Raphael Bob-Waksberg, comedian, writer, producer, actor, and voice actor
  - Dee Brown, basketball player
  - Garrett Wolfe, football player
- August 18 – Kim Glass, volleyball player and model
- August 19
  - Micah Alberti, model and actor
  - Jermon Bushrod, football player
  - Quinton Lucas, politician, mayor of Kansas City, Missouri (2019–present)
- August 20 – Tom Speer, mixed martial artist
- August 21
  - Josh Kruger, journalist (d. 2023)
  - Melissa Schuman, singer and actress, member of Dream
  - Eve Torres, actress, dancer, model, martial arts instructor, and wrestler
- August 23 – Charles Ali, football player
- August 24
  - Blake Berris, actor
  - Charlie Villanueva, basketball player
- August 25 – Kelly Bires, stock car racing driver
- August 26
  - Andrew Belle, singer/songwriter
  - Big Body Bes, rapper and television presenter
  - Chris Distefano, comedian
  - Craig Owens, singer and frontman for Chiodos
- August 27
  - Aone Beats, Nigerian-born record producer and songwriter
  - Amanda Fuller, actress
- August 28 – Sarah Roemer, actress
- August 29 – Kelly Anundson, mixed martial artist
- August 31 – Ryan Kesler, ice hockey player

=== September ===
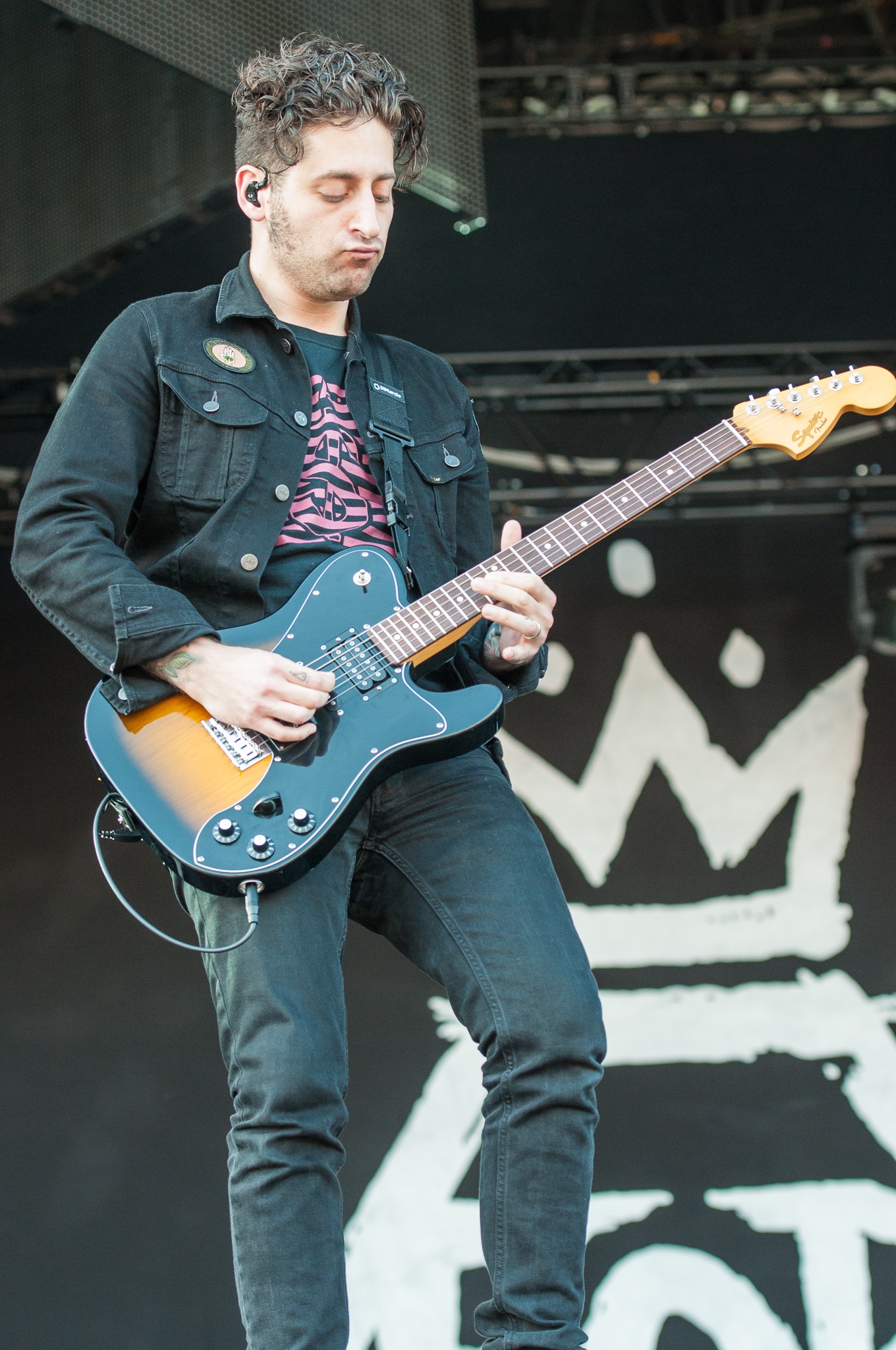
Joe Trohman

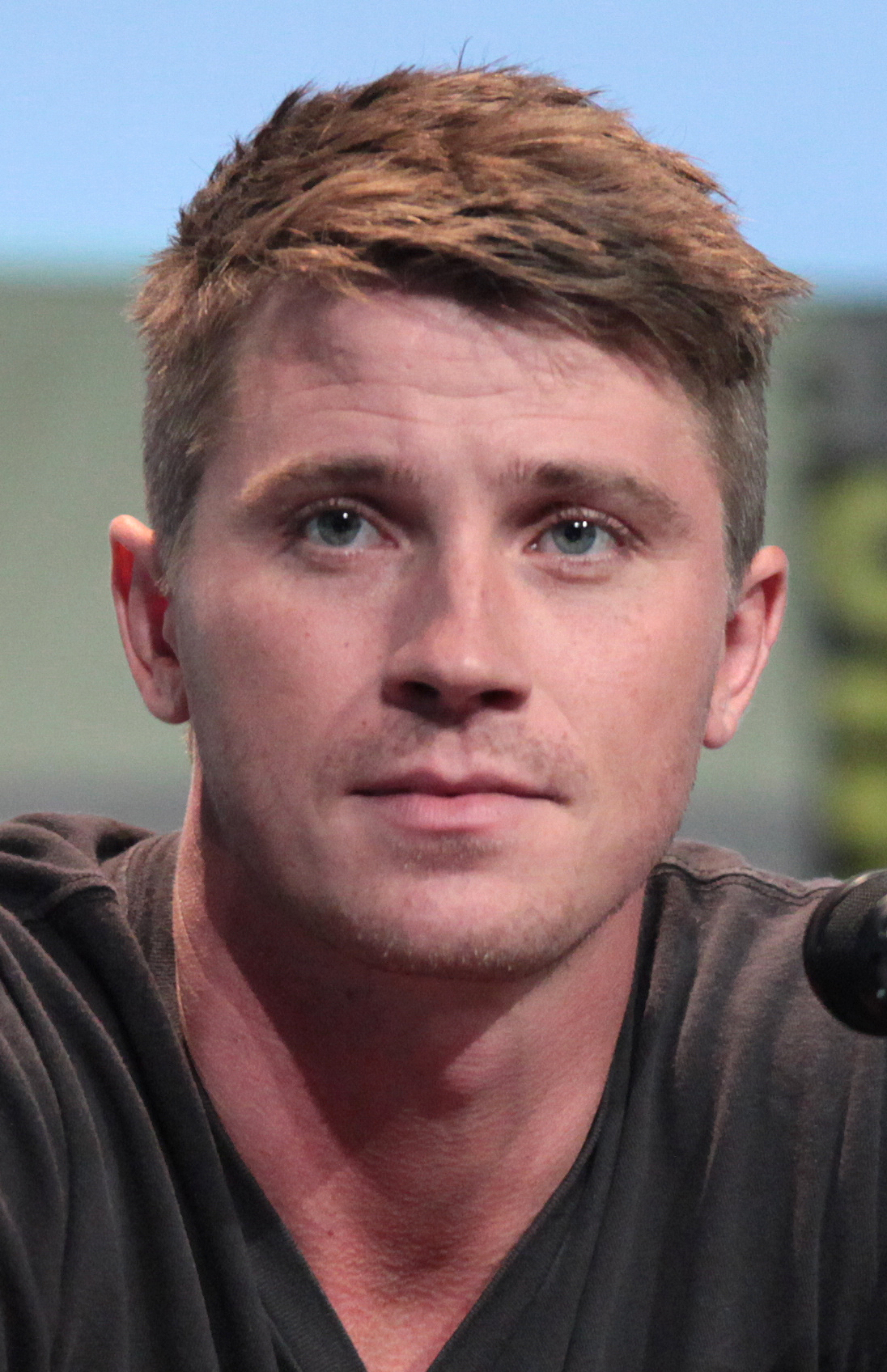
Garrett Hedlund

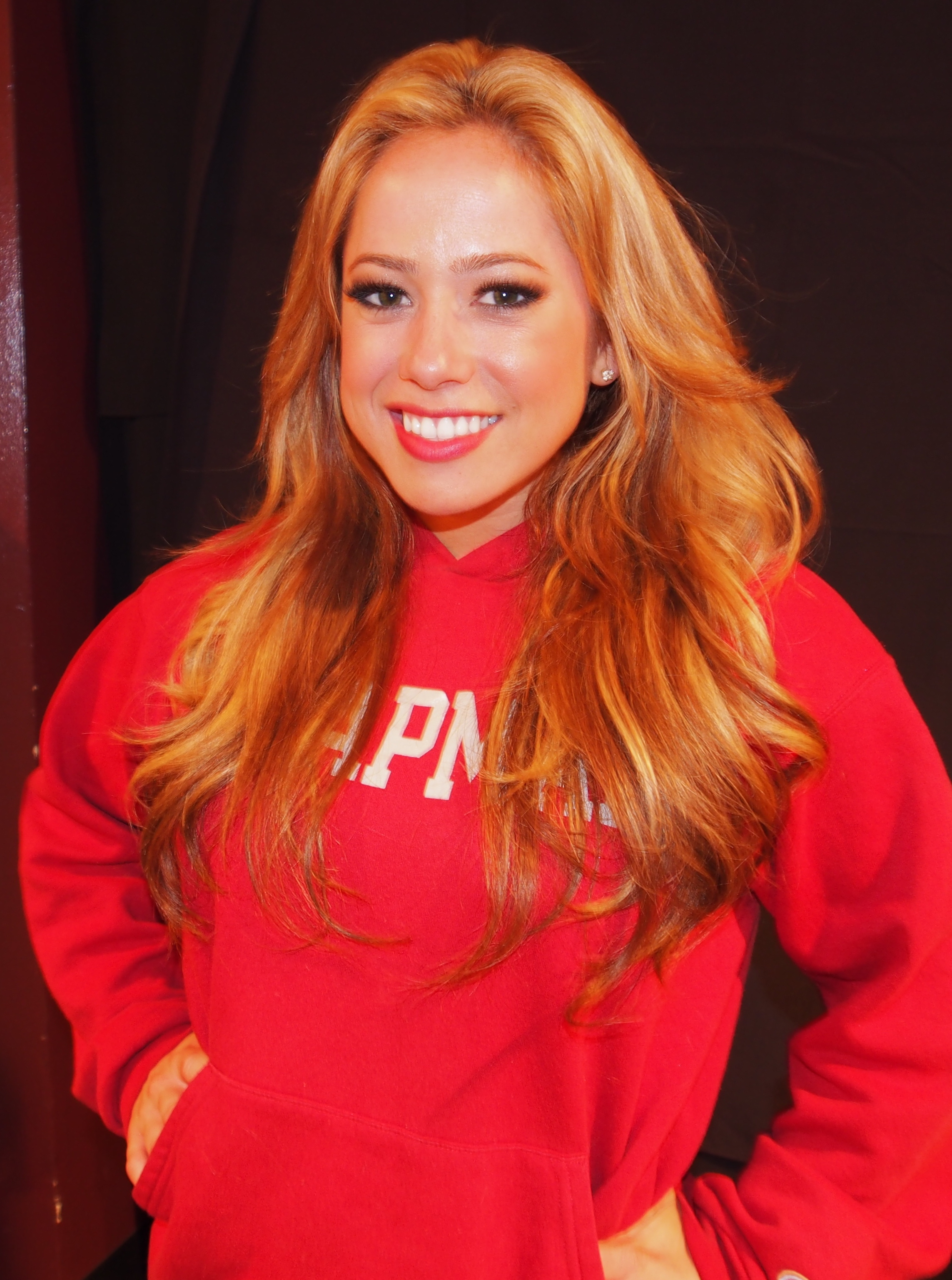
Sabrina Bryan

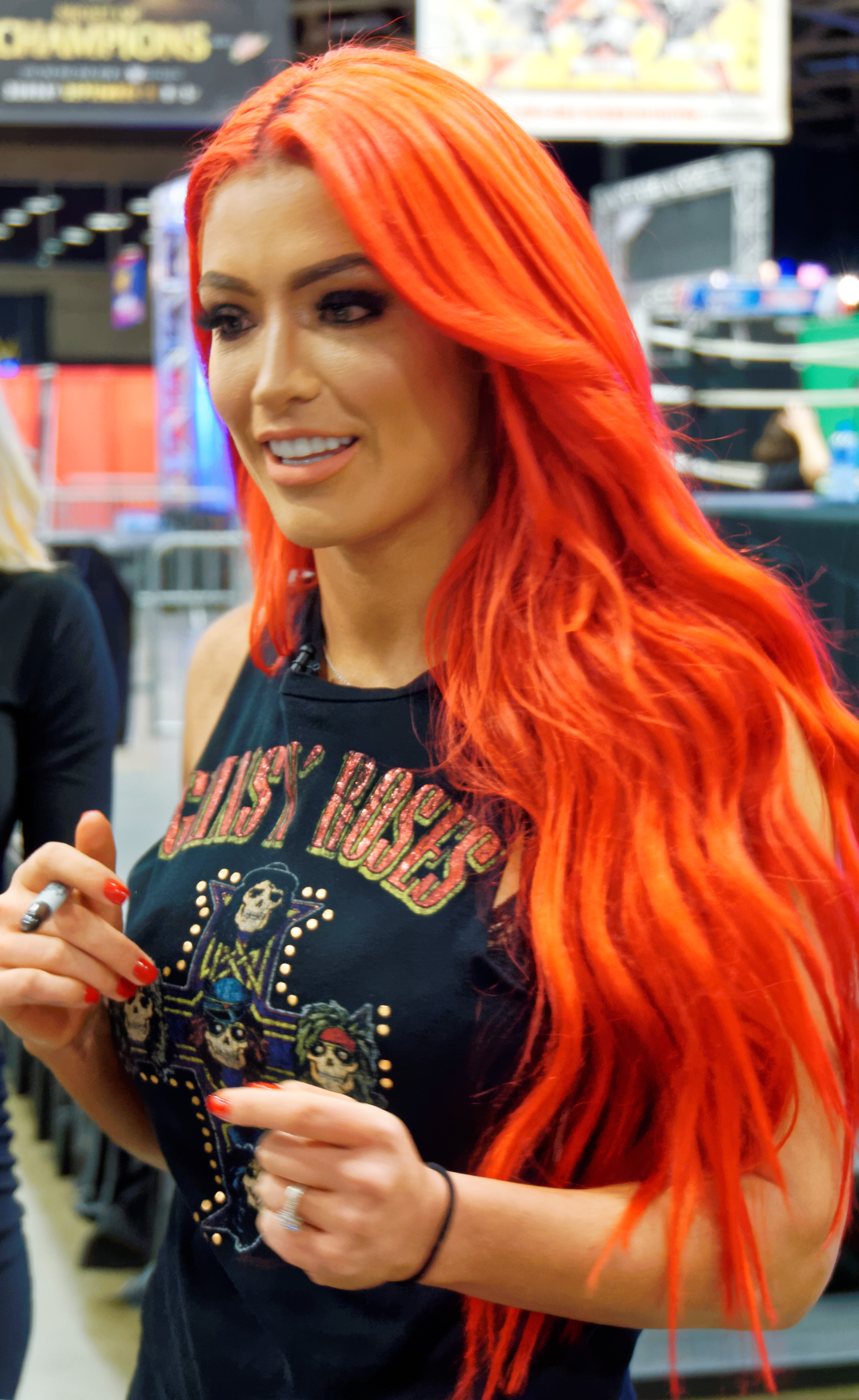
Eva Marie

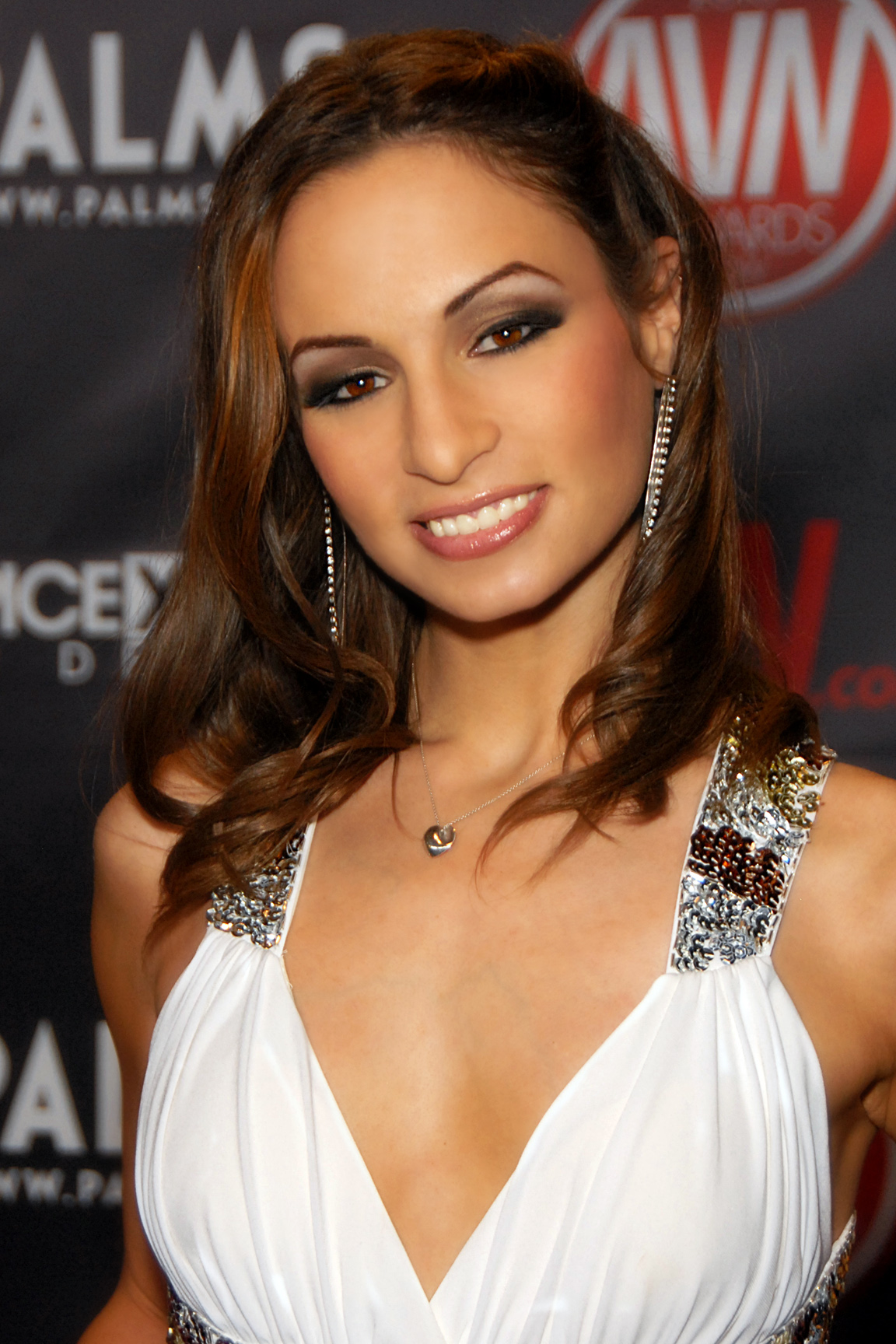
Amber Rayne

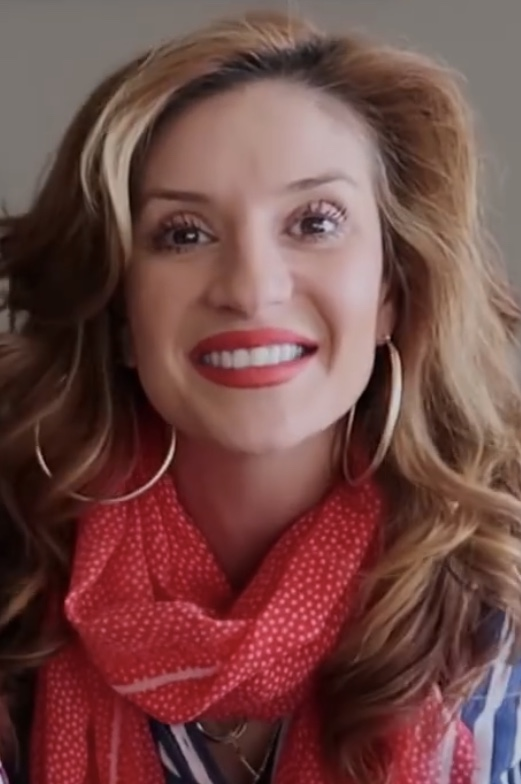
Anneliese van der Pol

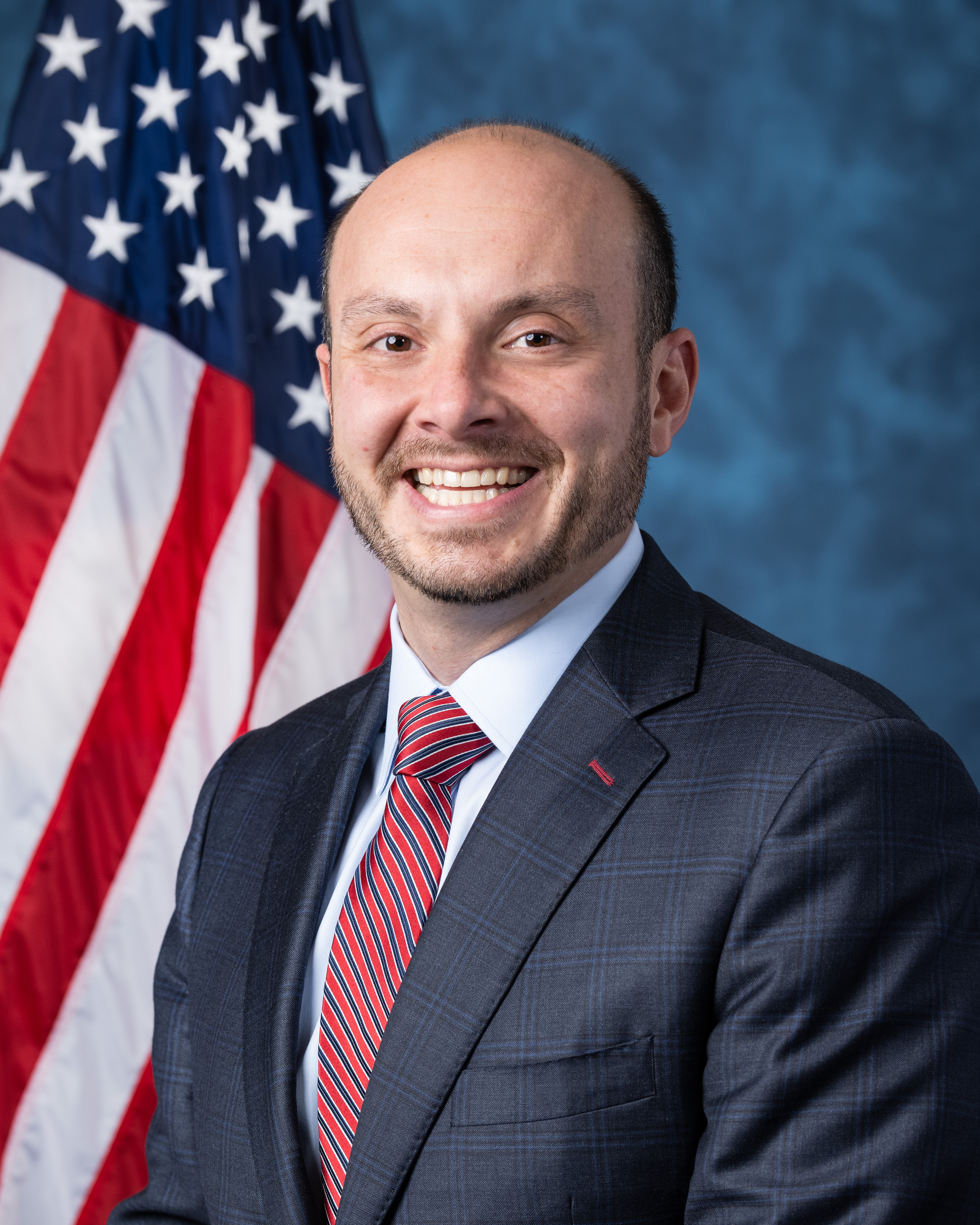
Andrew Garbarino

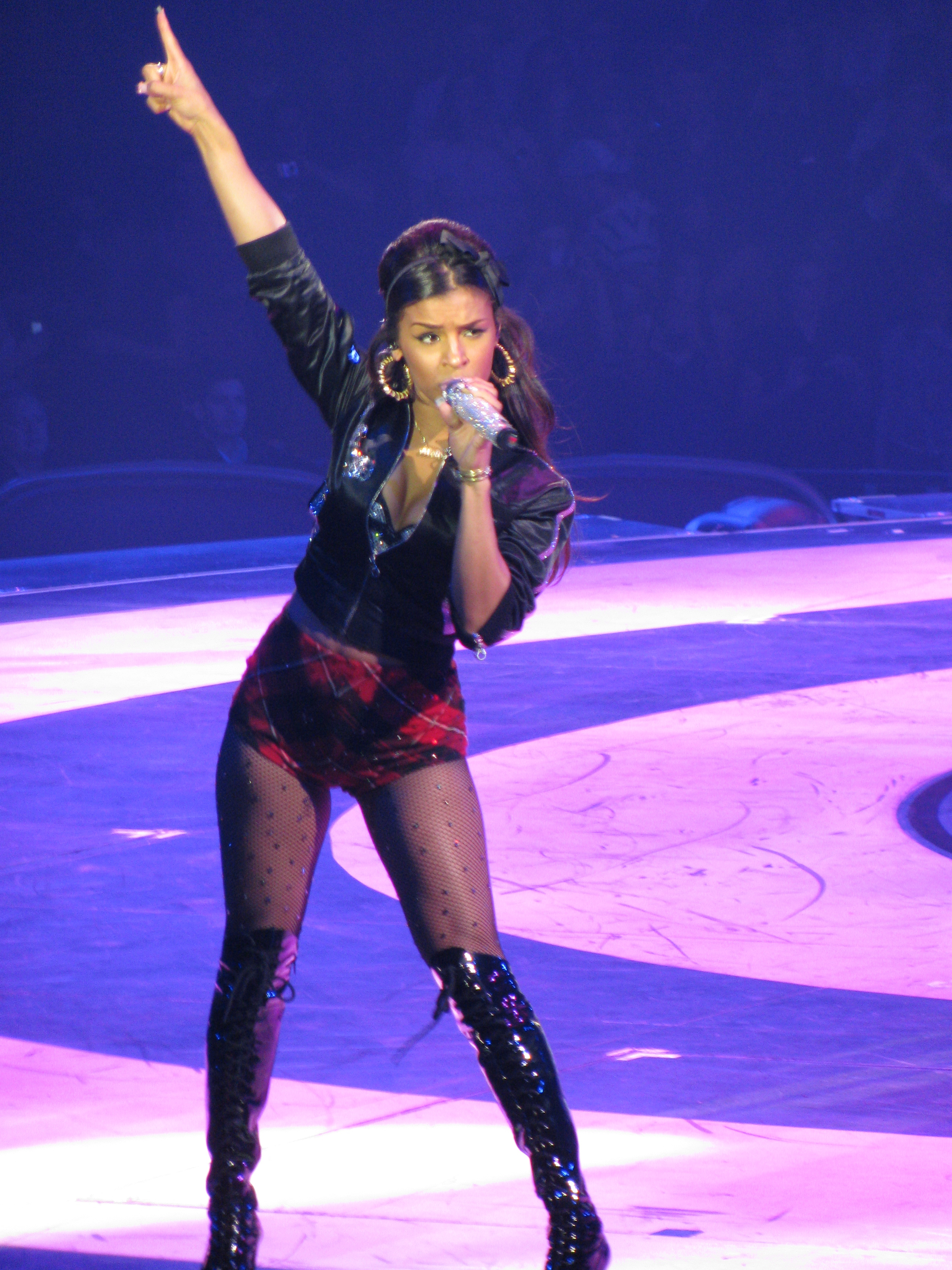
Melody Thornton

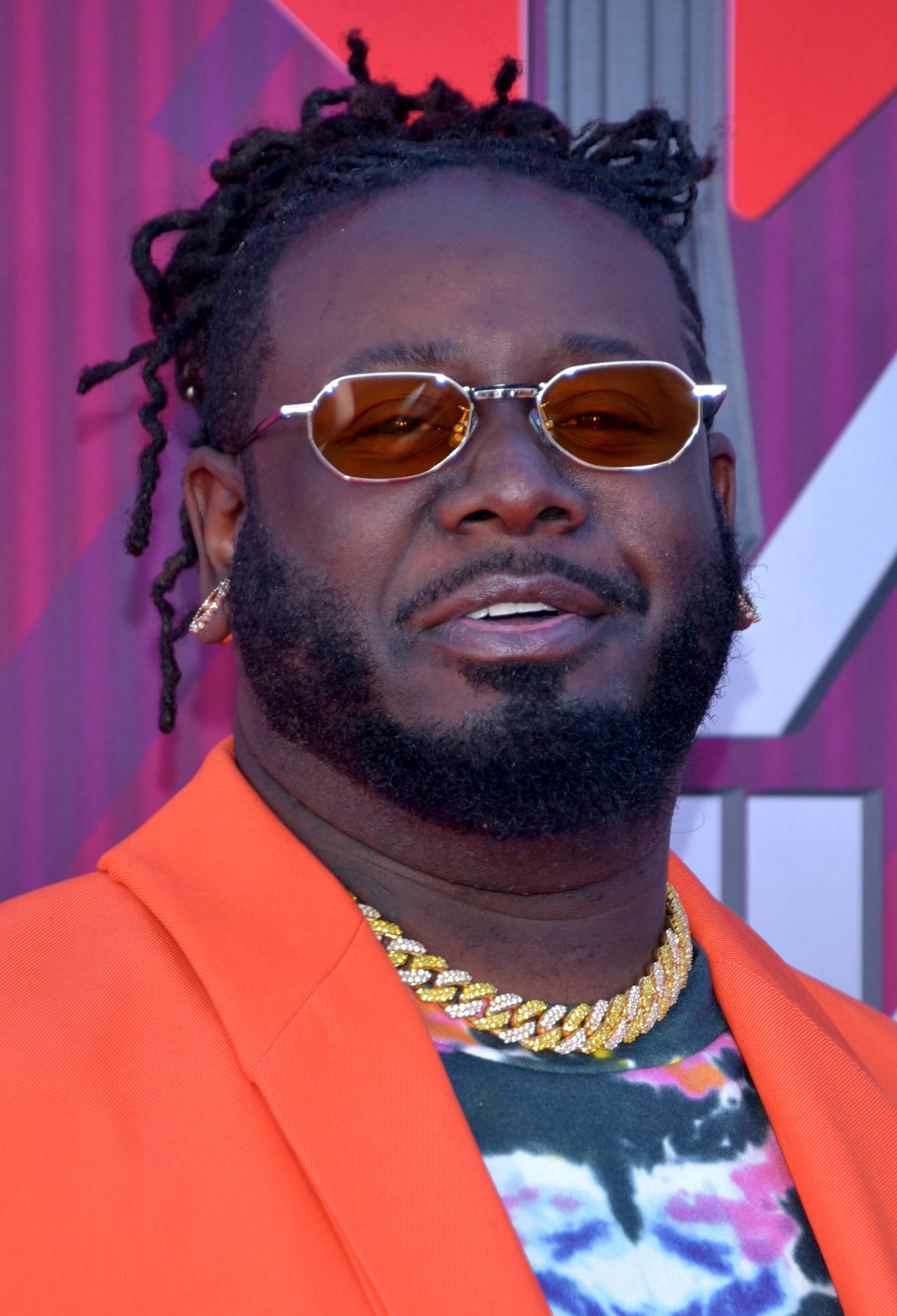
T-Pain

- September 1
  - Graham Platner, businessman and political candidate
  - Joe Trohman, singer-songwriter, composer and guitarist for Fall Out Boy
- September 2
  - Tyler Aldridge, golfer
  - Drew Jacoby, ballerina
  - Charles Trippy; musician, vlogger, Internet personality, and bassist for We the Kings
  - Tony Vargas, politician
- September 3
  - Garrett Hedlund, actor, model and singer
  - T. J. Perkins, wrestler
- September 4 – Kyle Mooney, actor, comedian and writer
- September 5
  - Nick Adams, Australian-born conservative political commentator and author
  - Jon Anderson, wrestler
- September 6
  - Matt King, artist and co-founder of Meow Wolf (d. 2022)
  - Abby Martin, journalist
- September 7
  - J. D. Bergman, wrestler
  - Kate Miner, actress and musician
- September 9 – Katie Balloons, balloon artist and entertainer
- September 10
  - Molly Aguirre, snowboarder
  - Wes Bergmann, television personality
  - Darnell Bing, football player
  - Andrew Brown, baseball player
- September 12 – Mildon Ambres, basketball player
- September 13
  - Nabil Abou-Harb, filmmaker, writer, producer, and director
  - Eric Butler, football player
- September 14
  - Melik Brown, football player
  - Adam Lamberg, actor
- September 15
  - Chiara Angelicola, singer/songwriter and musician
  - Cyhi the Prynce, rapper and singer/songwriter
- September 16
  - Aaron Brant, football player
  - Sabrina Bryan, actress and singer
  - Stanley Burrell, basketball player
  - Ali Fedotowsky, television personality
- September 18
  - Nina Arianda, actress
  - Cecil Brockman, politician
  - Dashon Goldson, football player
  - Anthony Gonzalez, football player and politician
- September 19
  - Rudy Burgess, football player
  - Eva Marie, actress, fashion designer, model, and wrestler
  - Young Greatness, rapper (d. 2018)
  - Lydia Hearst, actress and fashion model
  - Nicholas Markowitz, murder victim (d. 2000)
  - Amber Rayne, pornographic actress (d. 2016)
- September 20
  - Quinn Mulhern, mixed martial artist
  - Holly Weber, actress and model
- September 21
  - Dwayne Bowe, football player
  - Ben Wildman-Tobriner, Olympic swimmer
  - Rashad McCants, basketball player
  - Wale, rapper
- September 22
  - Richard Bryant, actor
- September 23
  - CariDee English, model and television personality
  - Kate French, actress and model
  - Matt Kemp, baseball player
  - Anneliese van der Pol, Dutch-born actress and singer
- September 24
  - Ryan Ashton, actor, director, and screenwriter
  - Esther Baxter, model and actress
  - Bobby Brown, basketball player
- September 25
  - Devin Aromashodu, football player
  - CariDee English, fashion model and TV personality
  - Zach Woods, actor and comedian
- September 26
  - John Dodson, mixed martial artist
  - Yaniv Schulman, television personality, host, and producer
- September 27
  - Kirk Archibeque, basketball player
  - Dan Briggs, bassist for Between the Buried and Me
  - Andrew Garbarino, politician
- September 28
  - Baraka Atkins, football player
  - H. B. Blades, football player
  - Melody Thornton, singer, member of the Pussycat Dolls
  - Ryan Zimmerman, baseball player
- September 30
  - T-Pain, singer-songwriter, rapper, record producer and actor

=== October ===
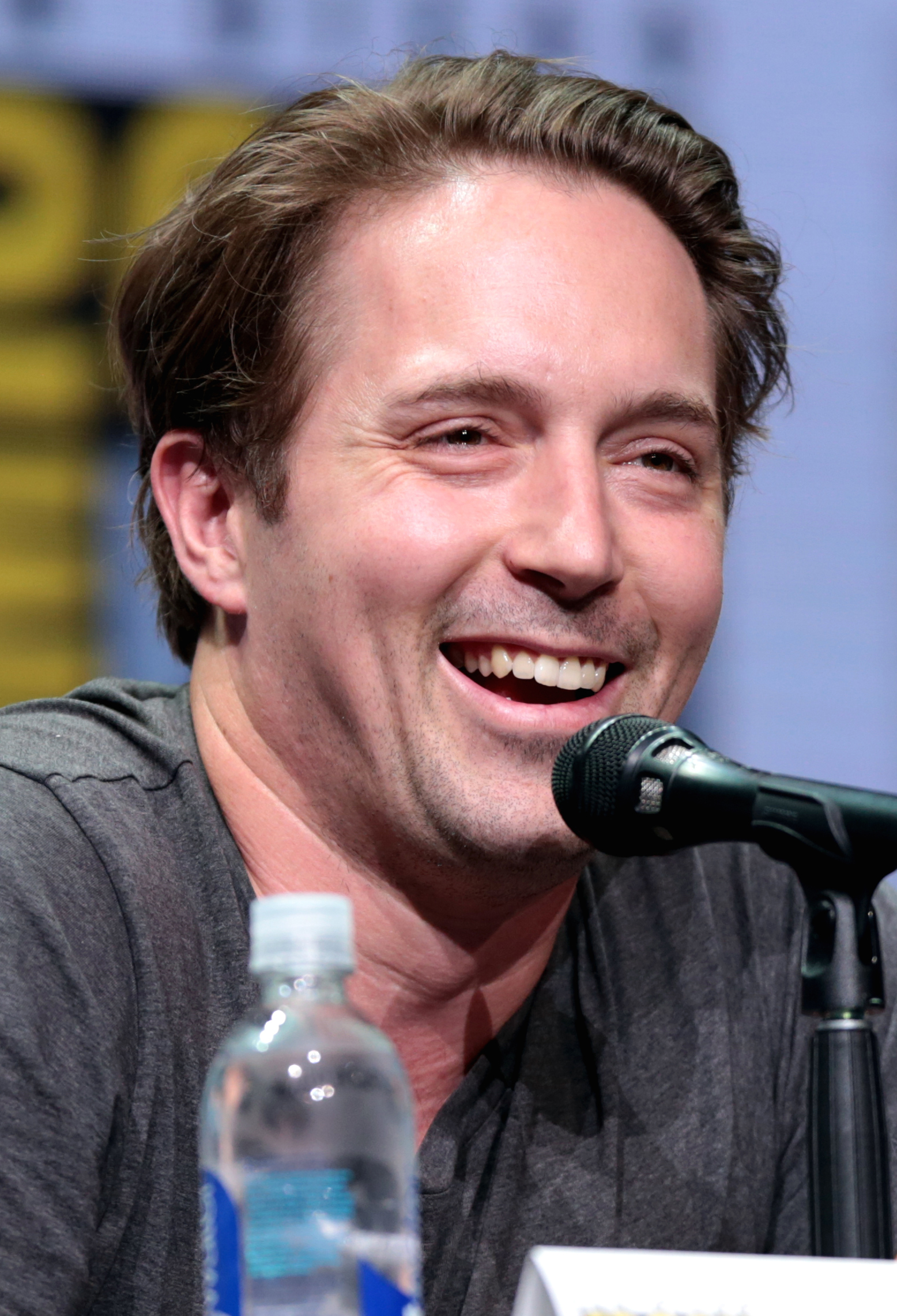
Beck Bennett

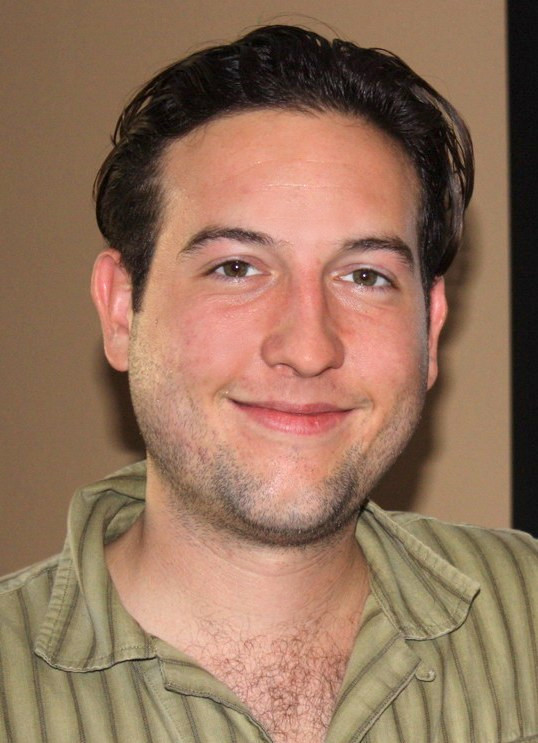
Chris Marquette

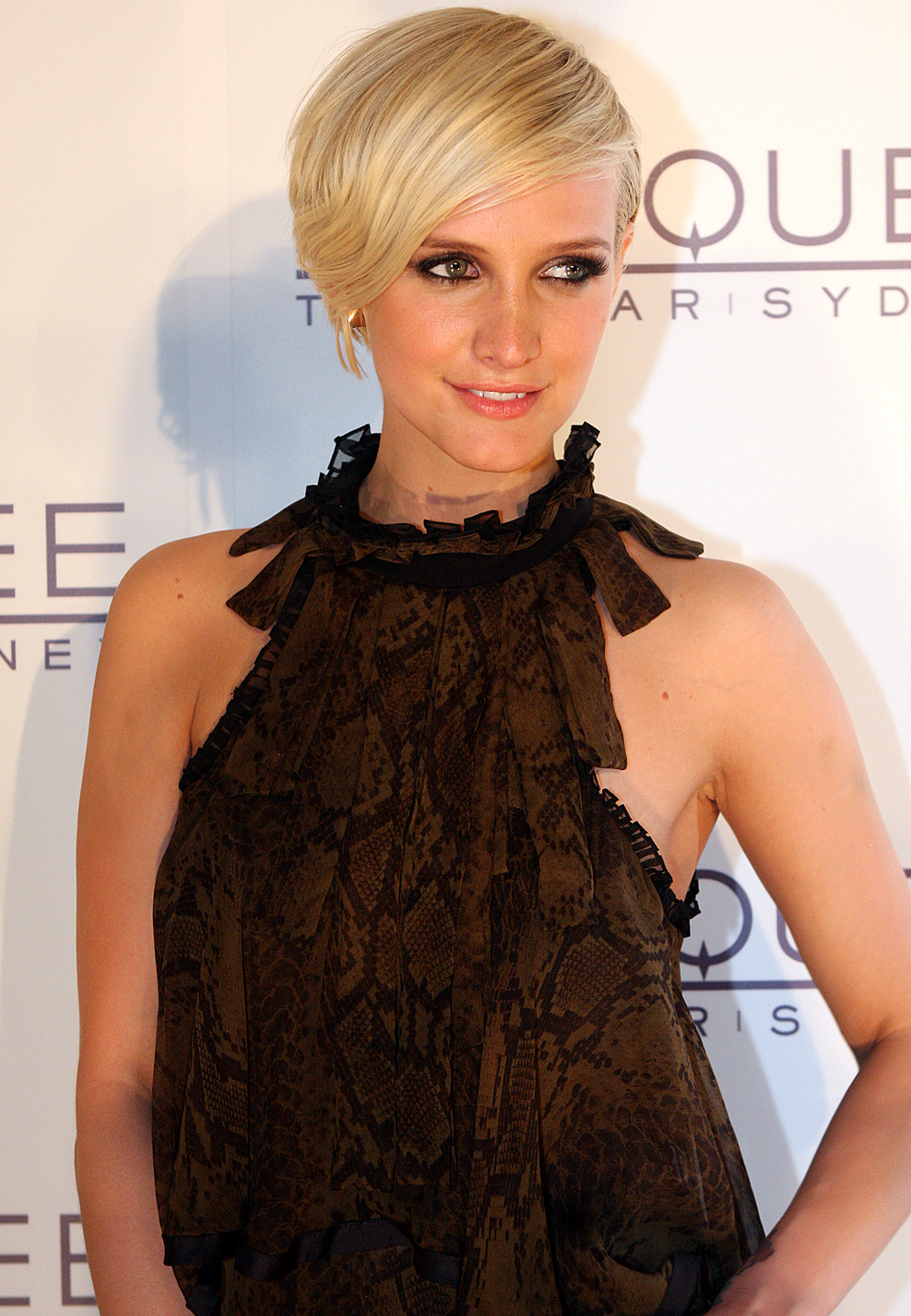
Ashlee Simpson

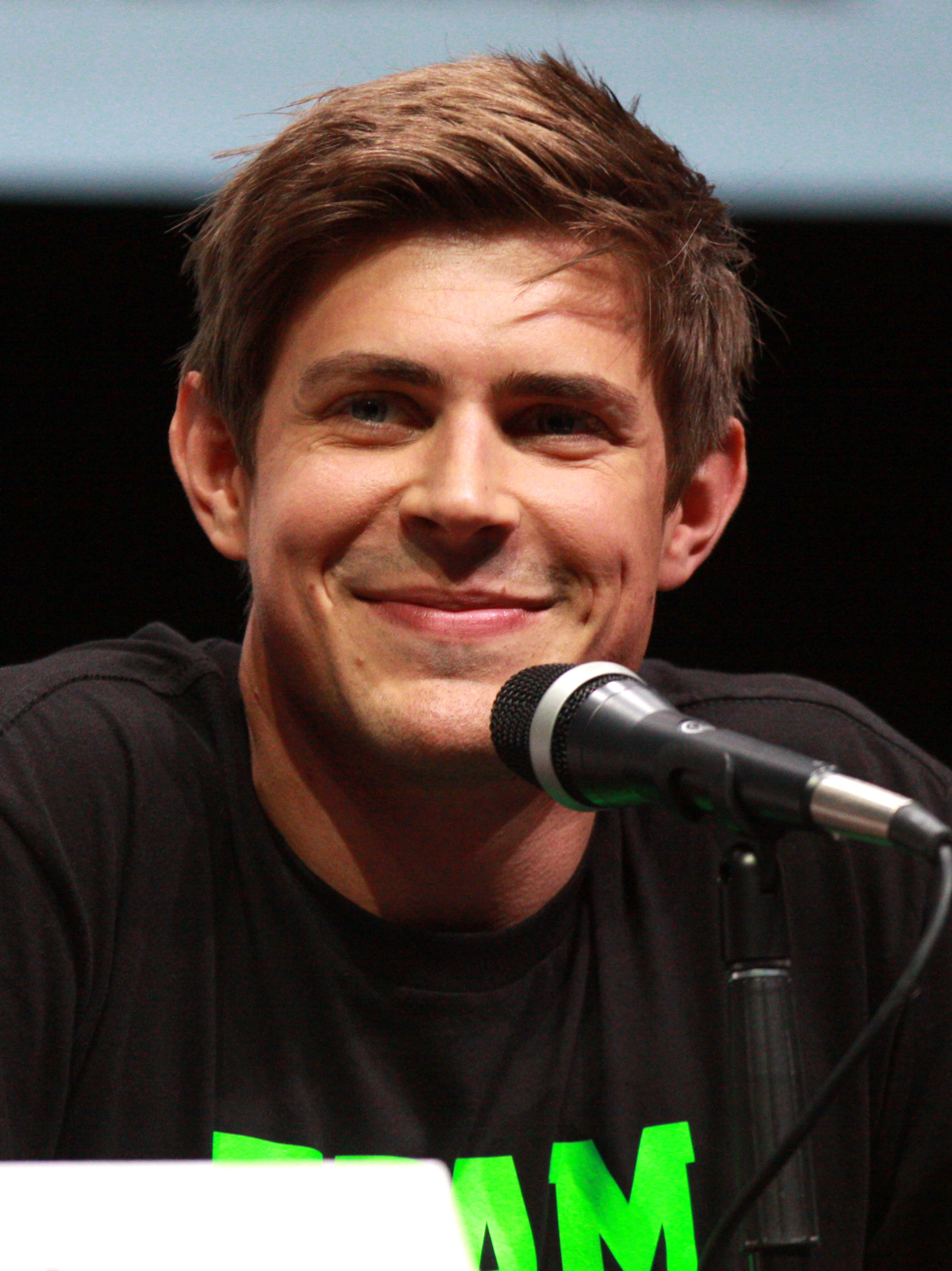
Chris Lowell

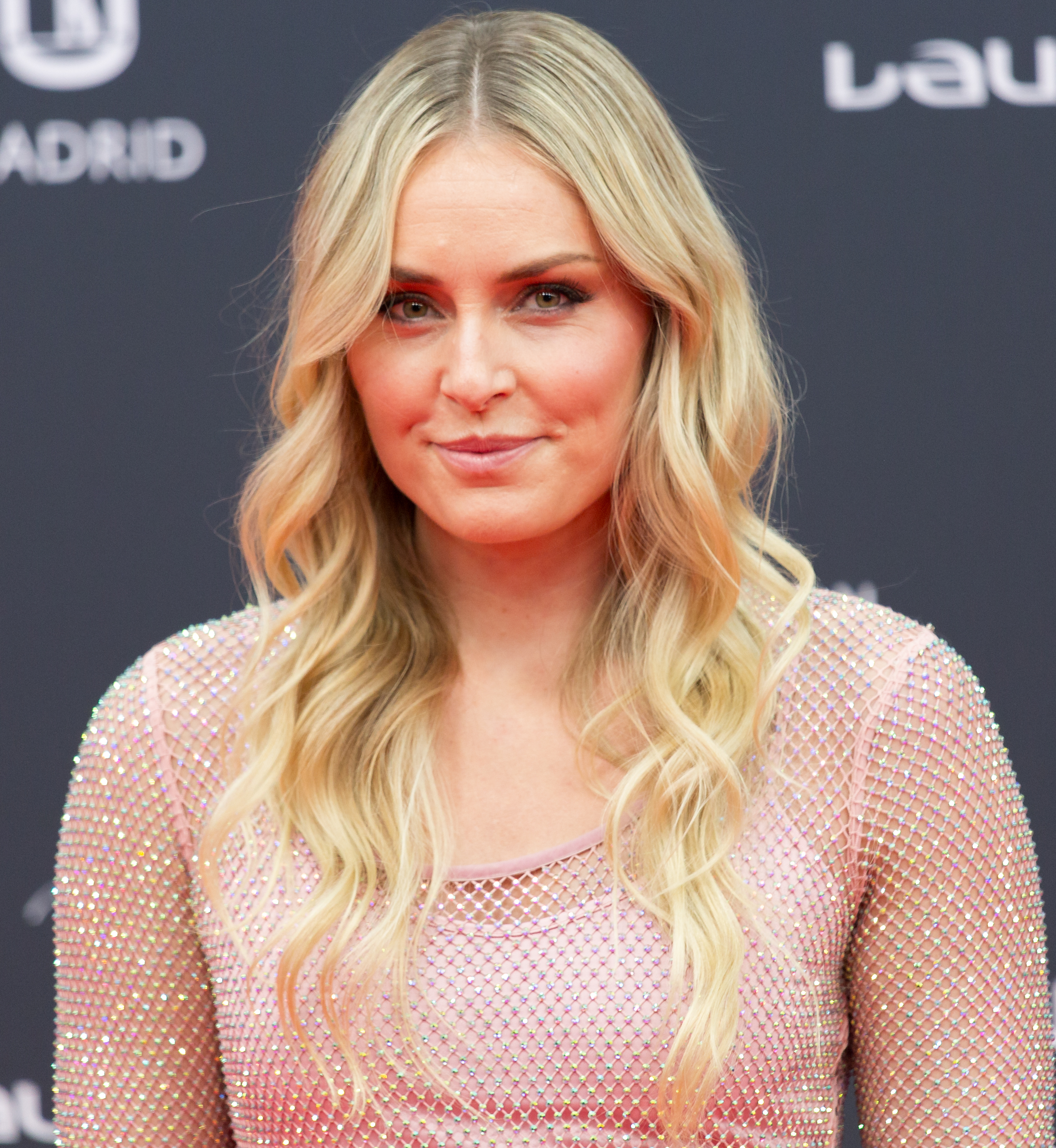
Lindsey Vonn

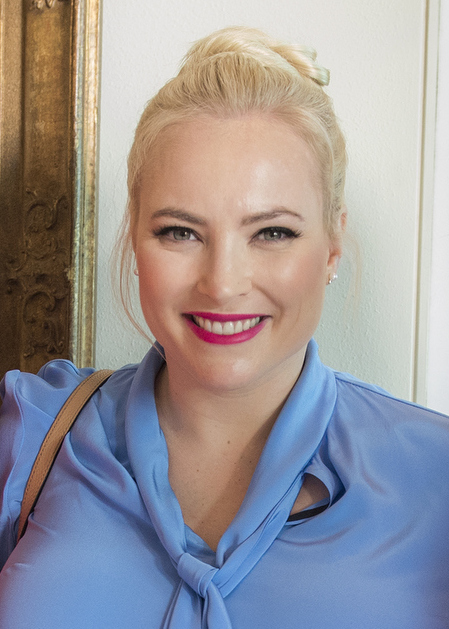
Meghan McCain

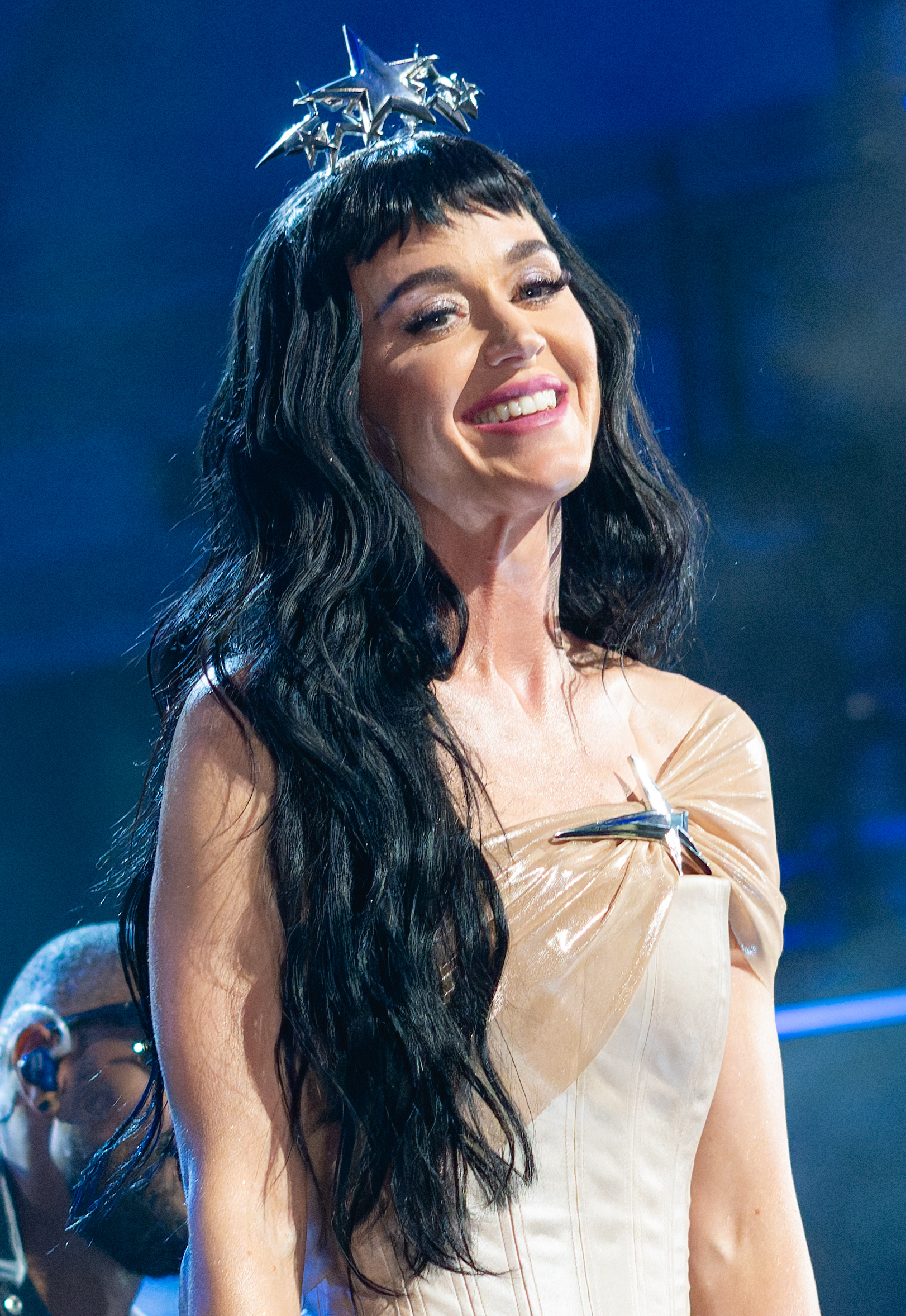
Katy Perry

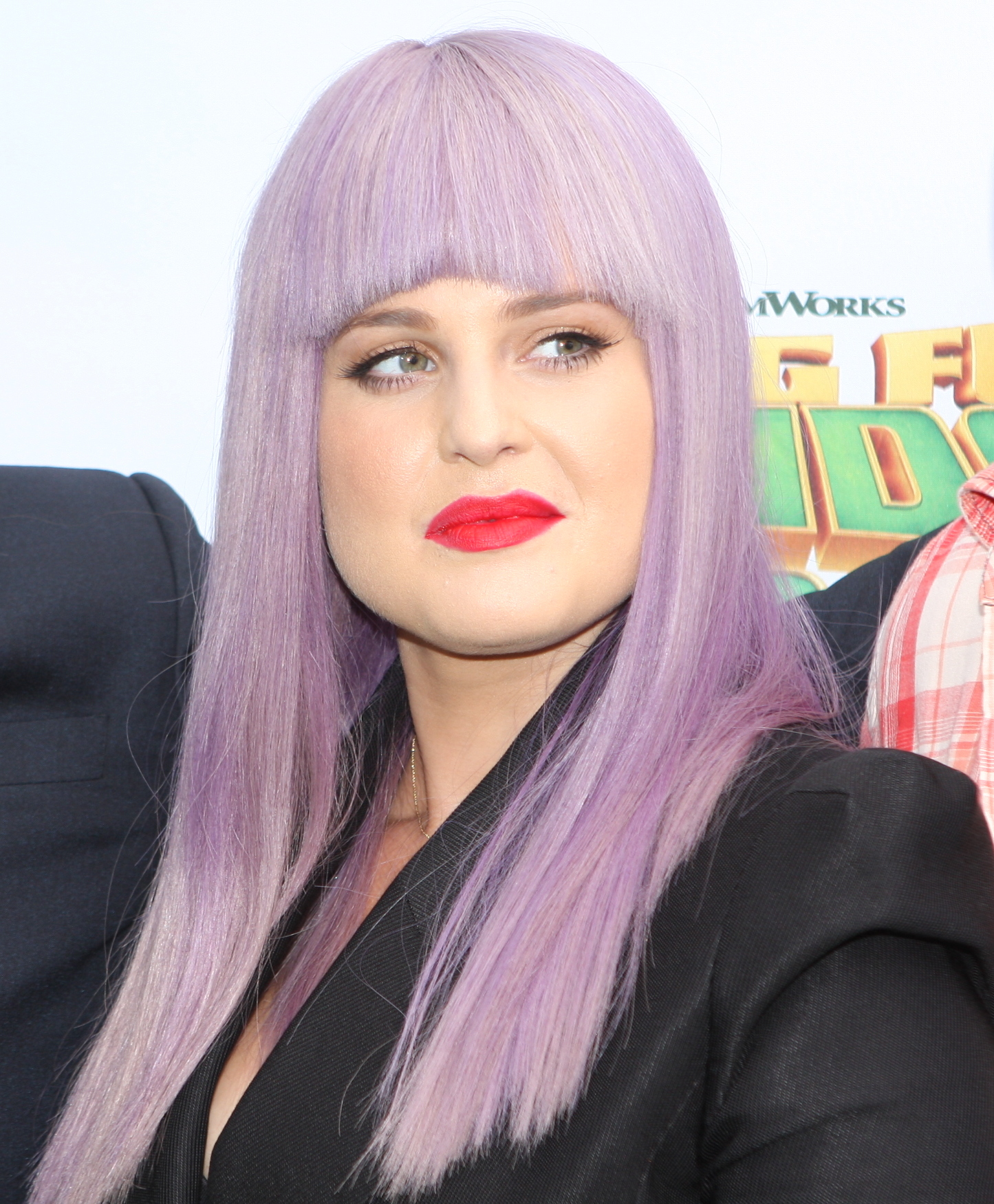
Kelly Osbourne

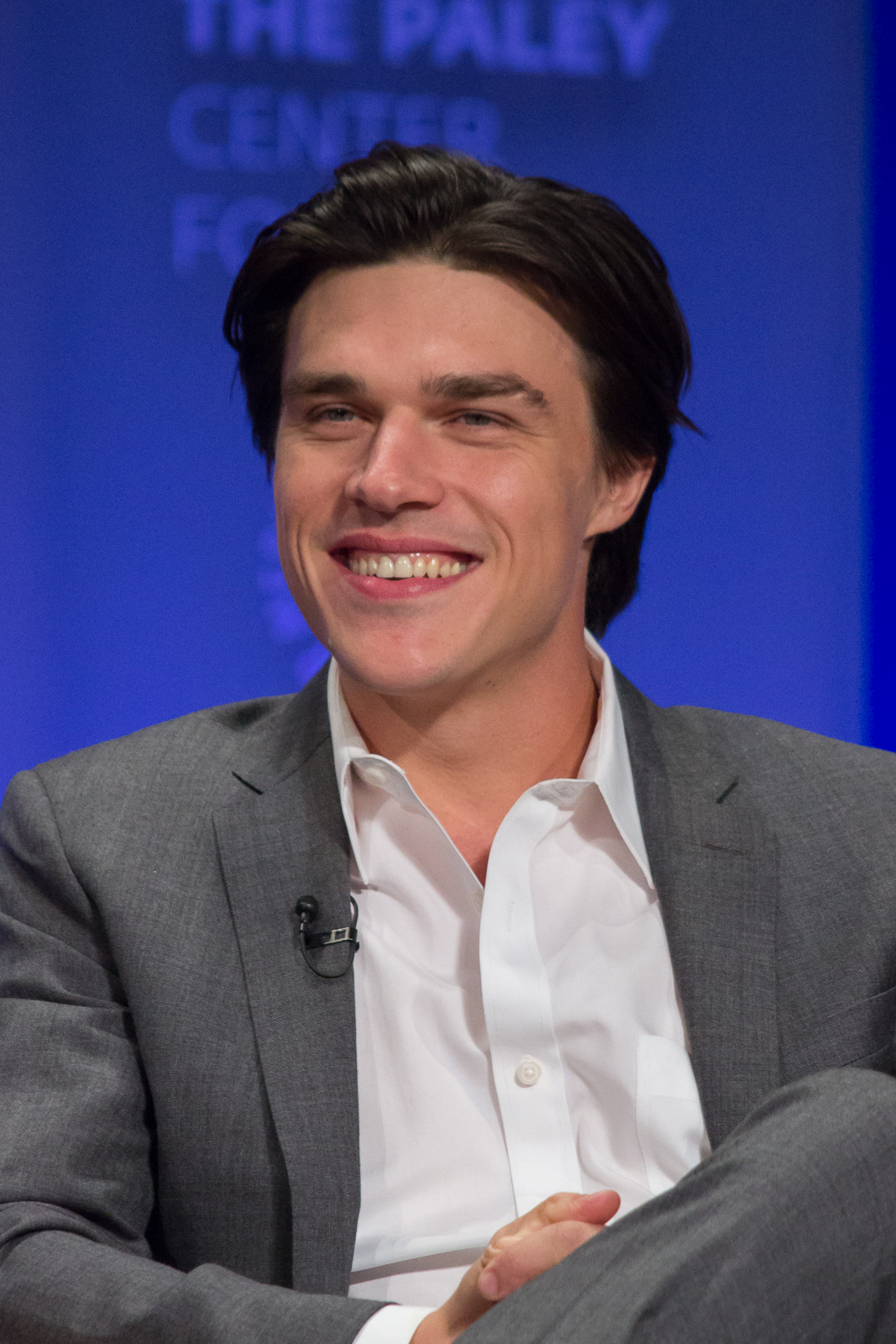
Finn Wittrock

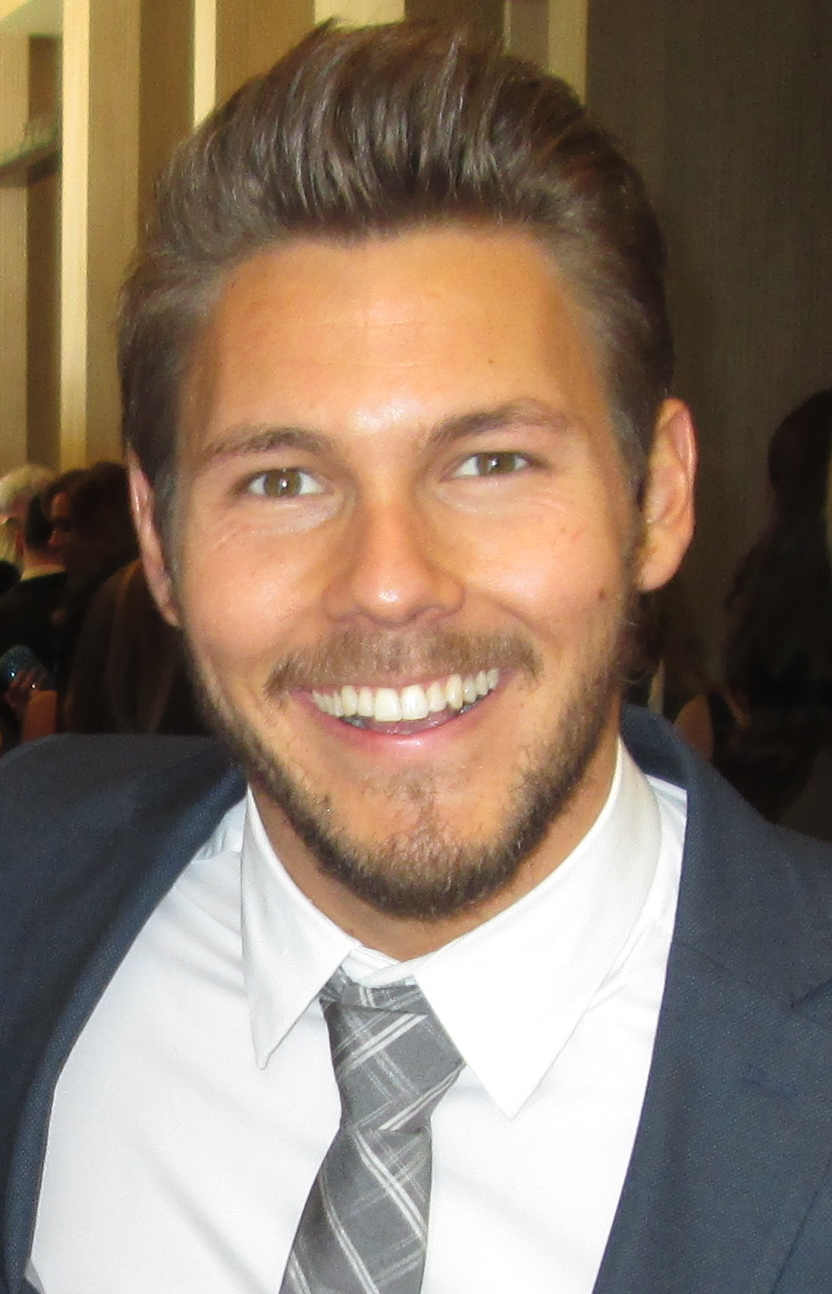
Scott Clifton

- October 1
  - Inaki Basauri, Mexican-born rugby player
  - Beck Bennett, actor and screenwriter
  - Josh Brener, actor
  - Matt Cain, baseball player
- October 2
  - Courtney Bryan, football player
  - Ray Burse, soccer player
  - Jena Griswold, politician
  - John Morris, actor
- October 3
  - Lance Barrett, MLB umpire
  - Chris Marquette, actor
  - Ashlee Simpson, singer and actress
- October 4 – James Landry Hébert, actor
- October 5
  - Naima Adedapo, singer and dancer
  - Odin Biron, American-born Russian actor
  - Casey Bond, actor, producer, and basketball player
  - Aishah Hasnie, Pakistani-born journalist
  - Brooke Valentine, urban musician
  - Julianna Zobrist, Christian singer/songwriter
- October 6
  - Afa Anoa'i Jr., wrestler
  - Reggie Ball, football player
  - Ben Barkema, football player
  - Austin Channing Brown, writer and public speaker
  - Joanna Pacitti, singer
- October 7
  - Andy Bean, actor
  - Mark Bradford, football player
- October 9
  - Heather Baker, producer, guitarist, and musical director
  - Tony Royster Jr., singer and member of Imajin
- October 10
  - Charlie Beljan, golfer
  - Rod Benson, basketball player
  - Tiffany Blackmon, sport reporter
  - Elana Meyers, Olympic bobsledder
  - Troy Tulowitzki, baseball player
- October 11 – Patrick Baynes, entrepreneur
- October 12
  - Lewis Baker, football player
  - Lauren Book, politician
- October 14
  - Jason Davis, actor (d. 2020)
  - Santino Quaranta, soccer player
- October 15
  - Brandon Bowman, basketball player
  - Larry Brown, football player
  - Bobby Burling, soccer player
- October 16 – Mkristo Bruce, football player
- October 17
  - Chris Lowell, actor
  - Randall Munroe, programmer and webcomic artist
  - Luke Rockhold, mixed martial artist
- October 18
  - Xavier Adibi, football player
  - Hollie Dunaway, boxer
  - Esperanza Spalding, singer
  - Lindsey Vonn, Olympic skier
- October 19
  - Ramon Alexander, politician
  - Antwan Barnes, football player
  - Justin Beaver, football player
  - Elaine Bradley, drummer for Neon Trees
  - Ashleigh Buch, USAF airman and ultimate player
- October 20
  - Dan Adams, football player
  - Mike Banner, soccer player
  - Charles Booker, politician
  - Mitch Lucker, heavy metal singer for Suicide Silence (d. 2012)
- October 21
  - Tom Brandstater, football player
  - Marvin Mitchell, football player
- October 22 – Scott Beck, director, producer, and screenwriter
- October 23
  - Jason Butcher, mixed martial artist
  - Meghan McCain, author and columnist, daughter of Senator John McCain
- October 24
  - George Bussey, football player
  - Ben Giroux, actor and director
  - Erin Lucas, actress
- October 25 – Katy Perry, singer-songwriter
- October 26 – Amanda Overmyer, singer
- October 27
  - Will Blackmon, football player
  - Kelly Osbourne, English-born television personality and singer
  - Brady Quinn, football player
- October 28
  - Adil Bhatti, Pakistani-born cricketer
  - Finn Wittrock, actor
- October 29
  - Chris Baio, bassist for Vampire Weekend
  - Keenan Burton, football player
- October 30
  - Scott Clifton, actor, musician and television personality
  - Eva Marcille, model
- October 31
  - Abdul El-Sayed, politician and epidemiologist
  - Pat Murray, football player
  - Anthony Varvaro, baseball player (d. 2022)

=== November ===
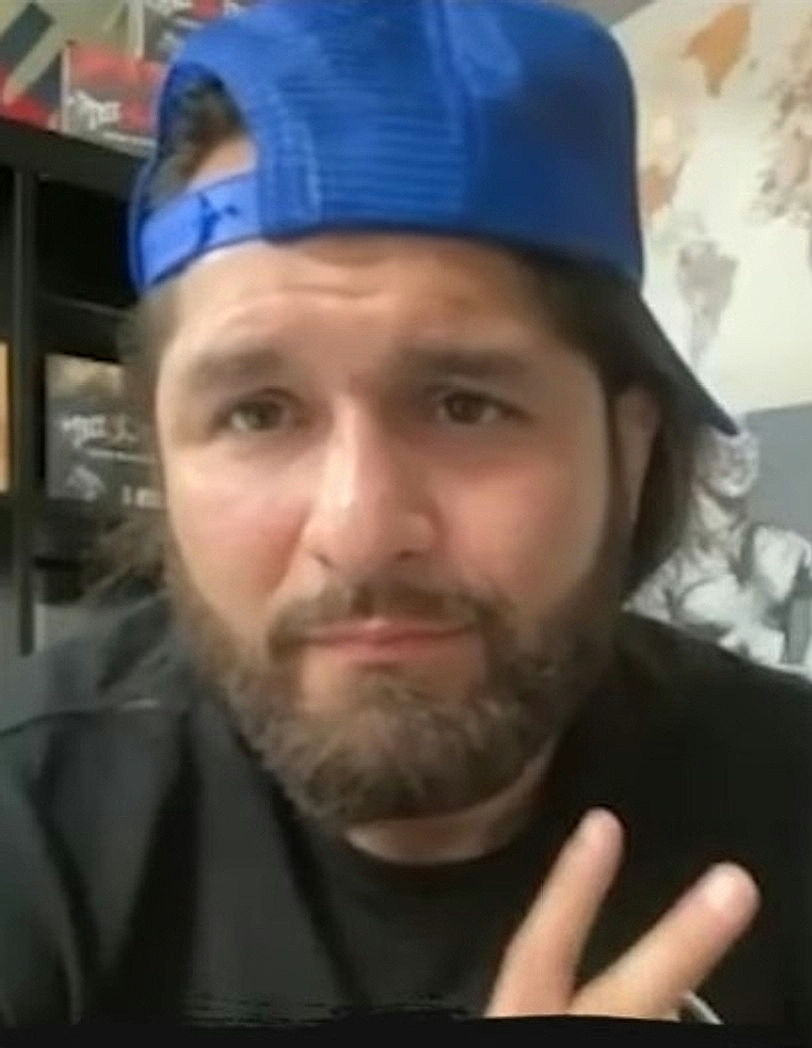
Jorge Masvidal

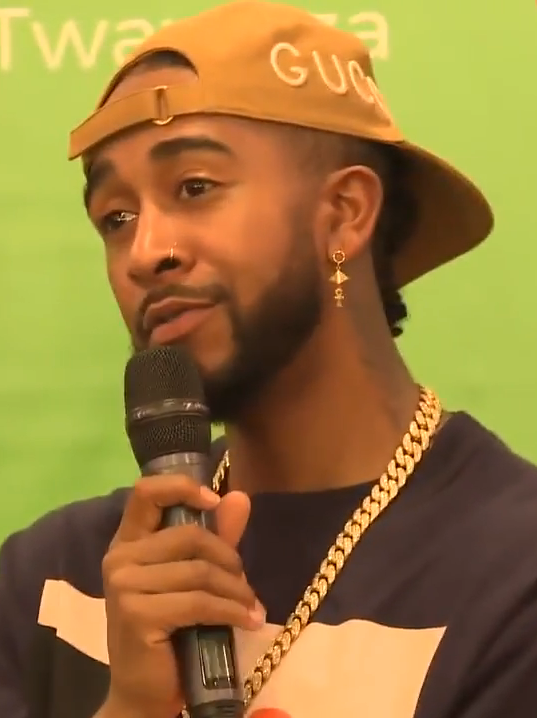
Omarion

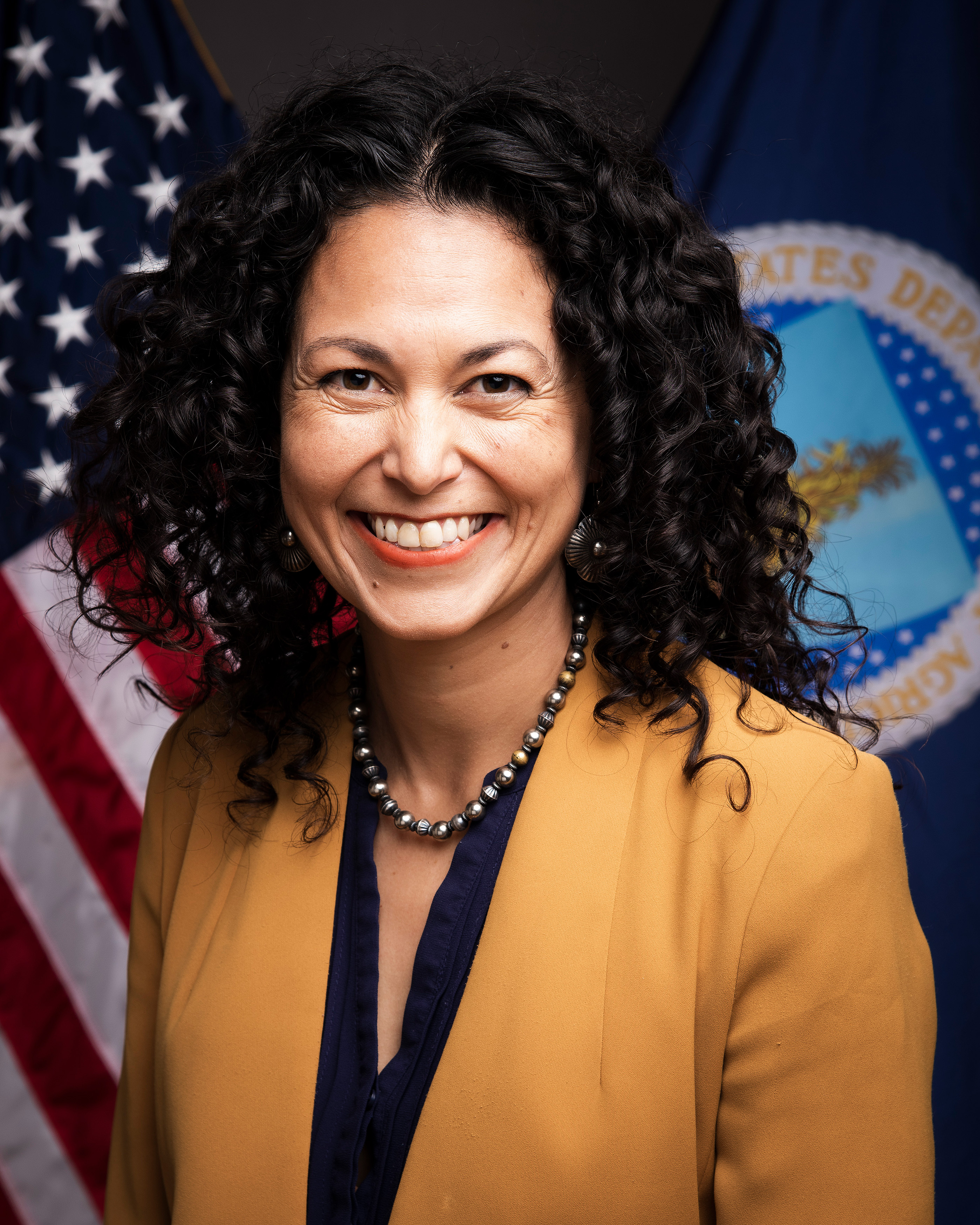
Xochitl Torres Small

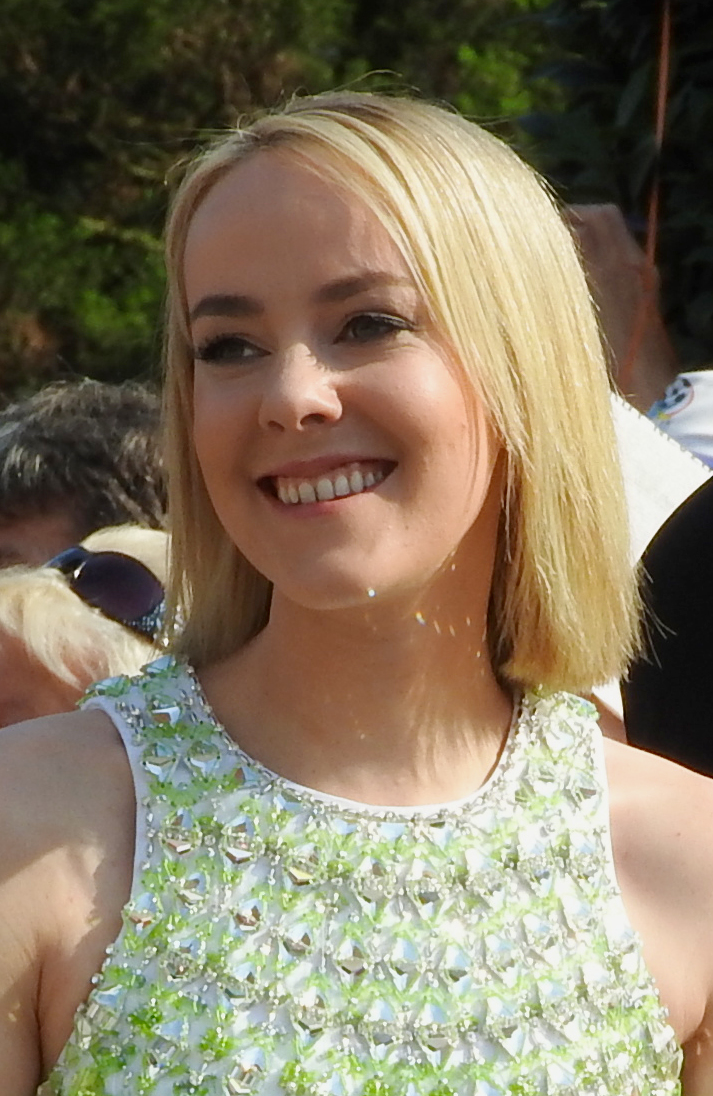
Jena Malone

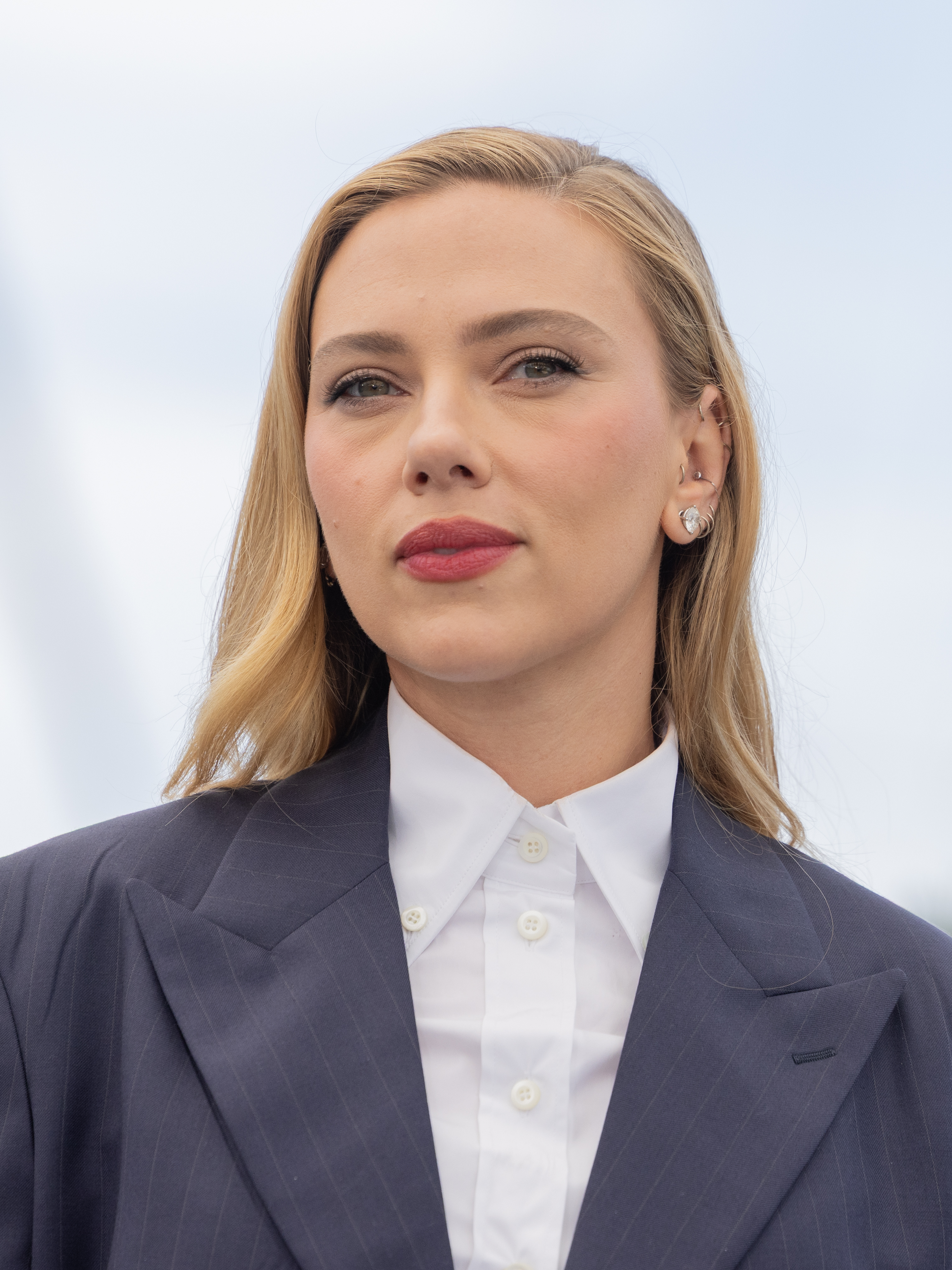
Scarlett Johansson

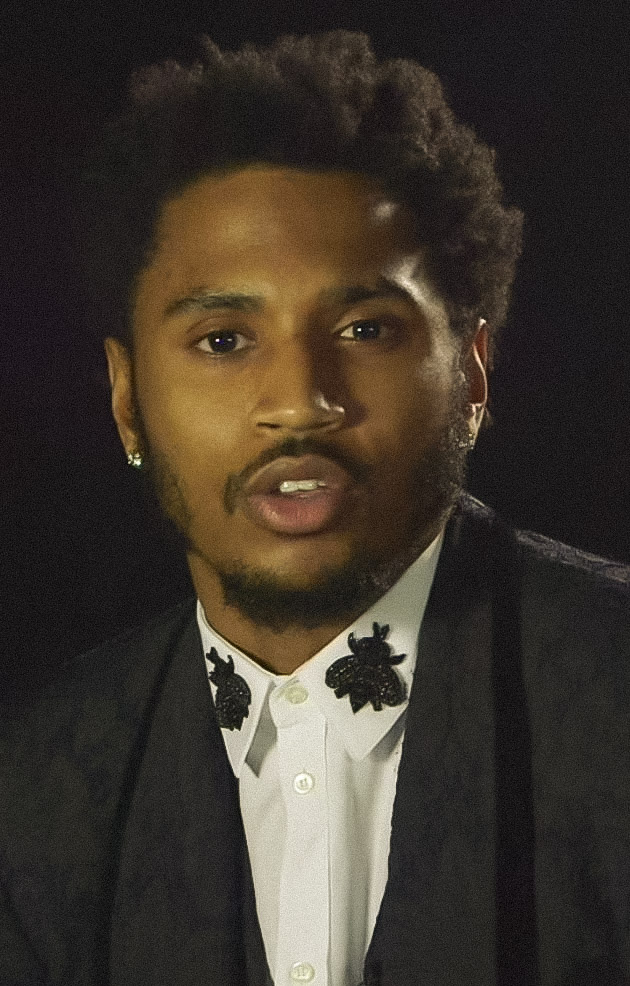
Trey Songz

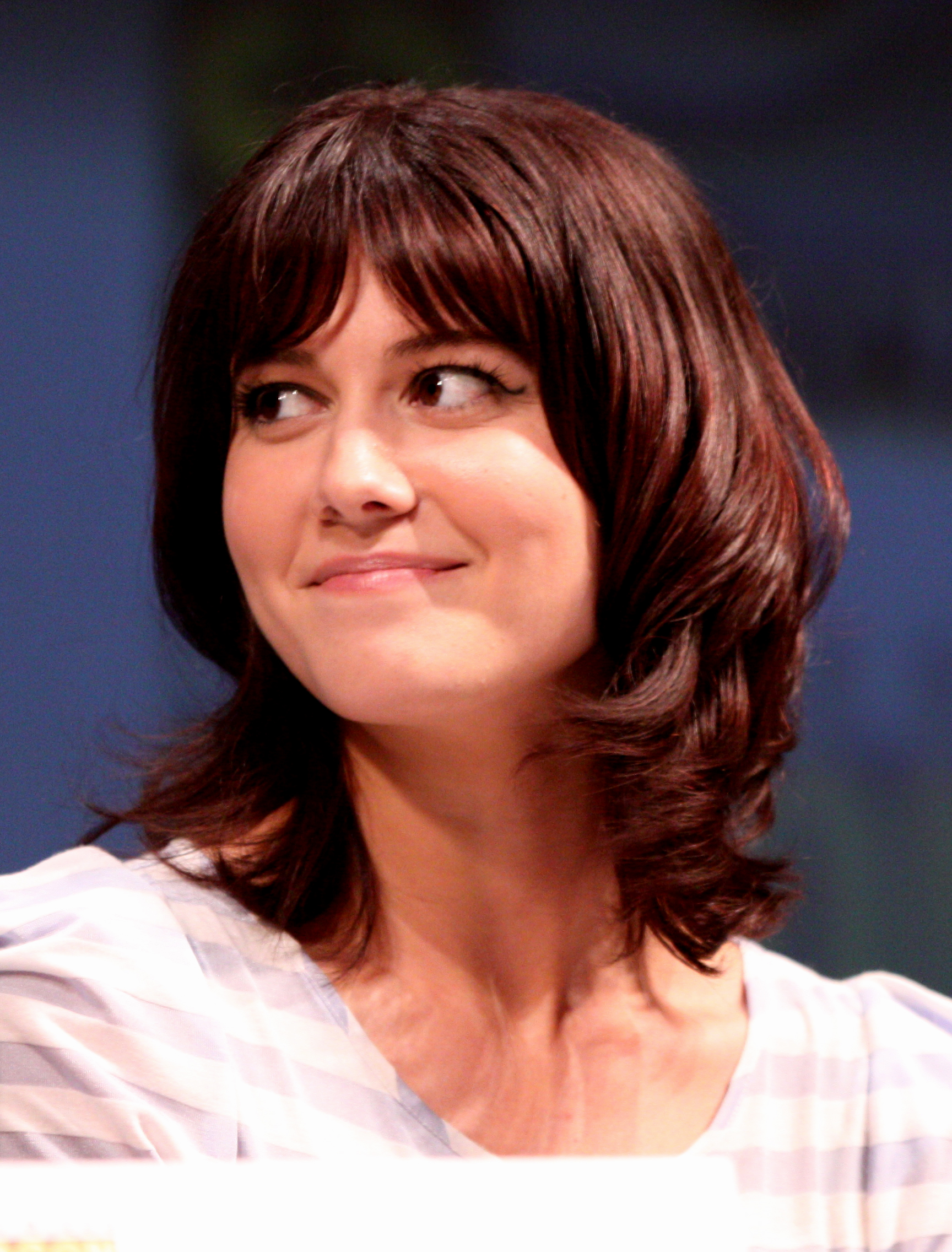
Mary Elizabeth Winstead

- November 1
  - Jenna Ellis, lawyer
  - Travis Jett, judge
- November 4
  - Branden Albert, football player
  - Dustin Brown, ice hockey player
  - Kirk Barton, football player
- November 5 – Nick Folk, football player
- November 6 – Ricky Romero, baseball player
- November 7
  - Jeff Allison, baseball player
  - Jonathan Bornstein, American-born Israeli soccer player
  - Simon Sherry-Wood, Irish-born television personality and model
- November 9
  - Beatrice Bofia, Cameroonian-born basketball player
  - French Montana, Moroccan-born rapper
  - Joel Zumaya, baseball player
- November 11
  - Hilton Armstrong, basketball player
  - Bryce Bennett, politician
  - Dallas Buck, baseball player
- November 12
  - Jorge Masvidal, mixed martial artist
  - Omarion, singer-songwriter and actor
  - Benjamin Okolski, figure skater
- November 13
  - Melvin Bullitt, football player
  - Gary Butler, football player
  - Sarah Rose Karr, actress
- November 14 – Tony Gaffney, basketball player
- November 15
  - Loren Brichter, software developer
  - Asia Kate Dillon, actress
  - Xochitl Torres Small, politician
- November 16
  - Adam Bagni, journalist and sportscaster
  - Kimberly J. Brown, actress
- November 17
  - Zach Anner, comedian, actor and writer
  - Lauren Maltby, actress and psychologist
- November 18
  - DeAnna Bennett, mixed martial artist
  - Zack Bowman, football player
- November 19
  - Greg Austin, football player
  - Lindsay Ellingson, model
- November 20
  - Ezra Butler, football player
  - Jeremy Jordan, actor and singer
- November 21
  - Josh Boone, basketball player
  - Jena Malone, actress, musician and photographer
  - Lindsey Haun, American actress and singer
  - Quintin Berry, baseball player
- November 22
  - Josh Barrett, football player
  - Scarlett Johansson, actress
- November 23
  - BJ the Chicago Kid, singer/songwriter
  - Bossman, rapper
  - Lucas Grabeel, actor
  - Jarah Mariano, model
- November 24
  - Anthony Alridge, football player
  - Brandon Bair, football player
  - David Booth, ice hockey player
  - Jeremiah Brent, interior designer and television personality
- November 25 – Ryan Baker, football player
- November 27
  - Benny the Butcher, rapper and actor
  - Rodney Burgess, football player
- November 28
  - Joshua Alan, singer/songwriter and musician
  - Trey Songz, singer/songwriter, rapper, record producer and actor
  - Mary Elizabeth Winstead, actress
- November 30
  - Tom Almadon, American-born Israeli footballer
  - Tim Myers, singer/songwriter and bassist for OneRepublic (2002–2007)

=== December ===
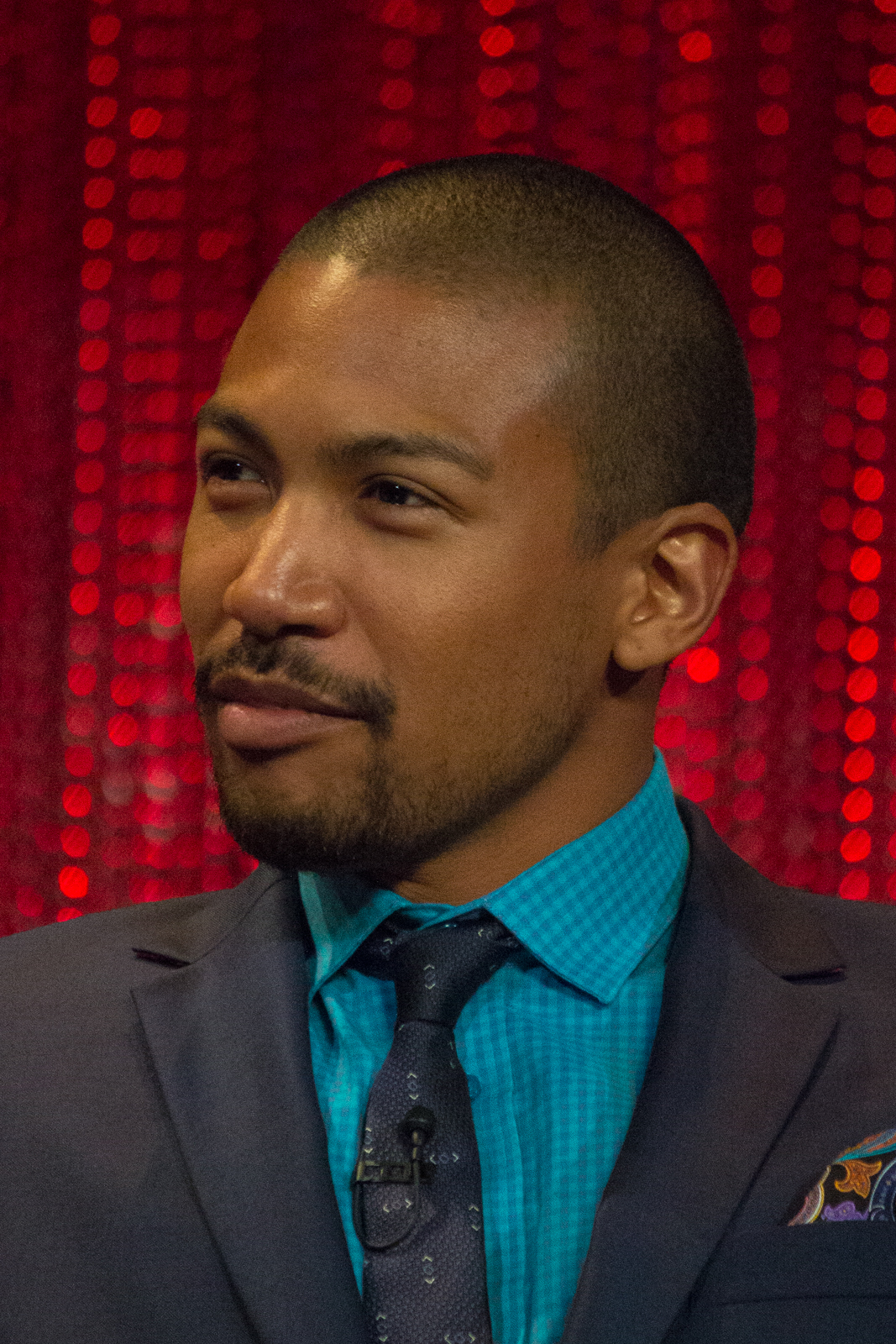
Charles Michael Davis

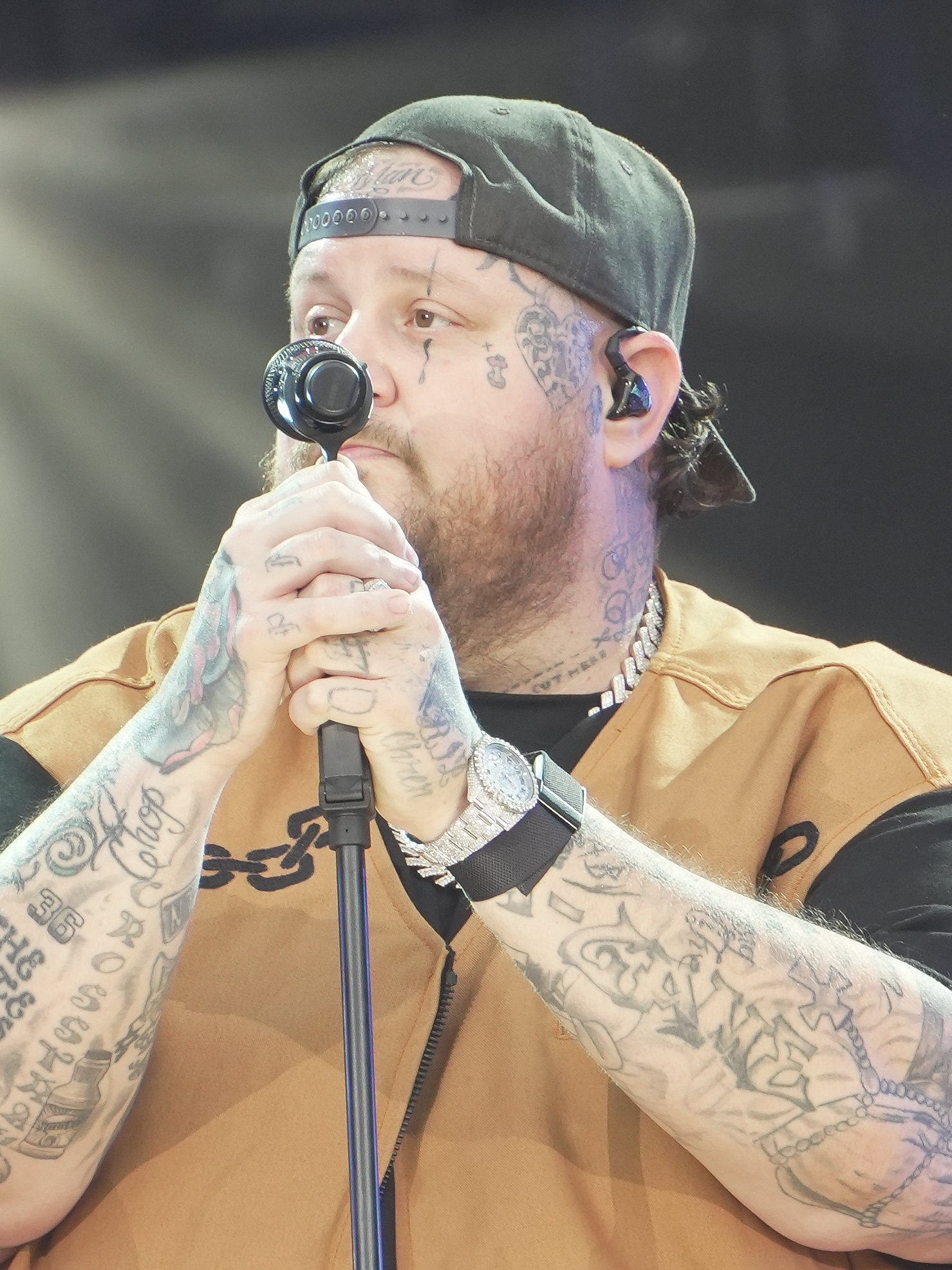
Jelly Roll

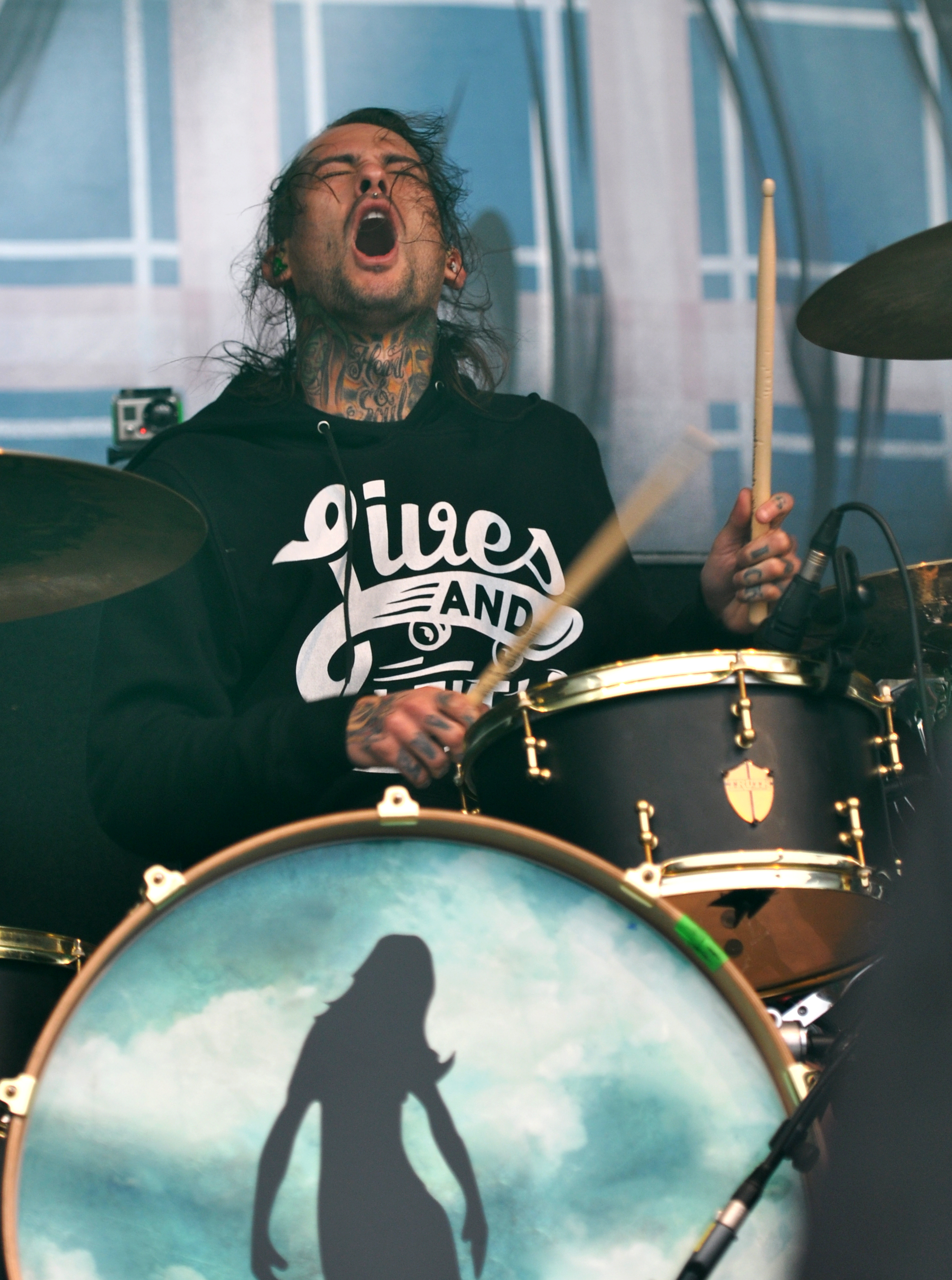
Mike Fuentes

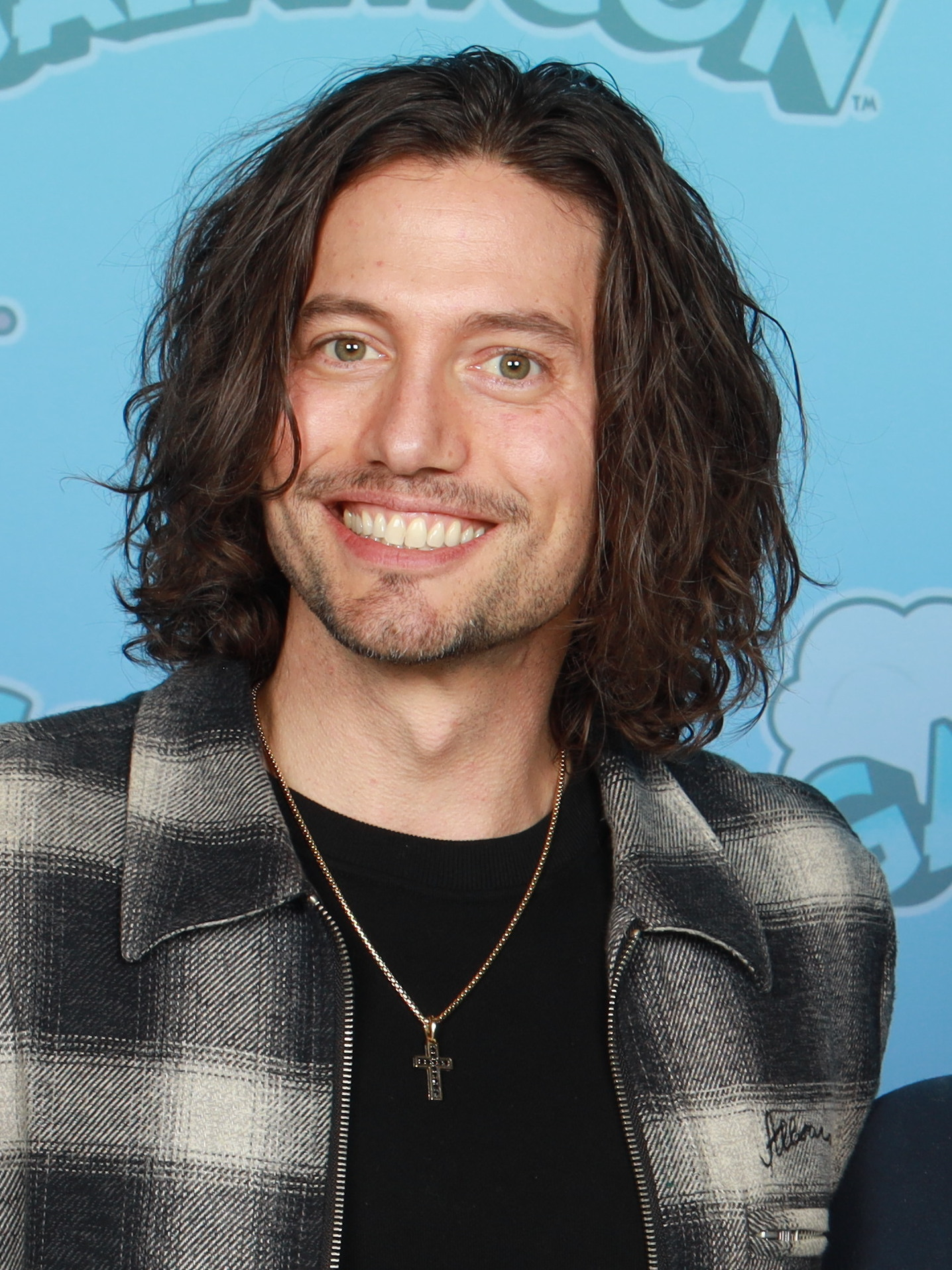
Jackson Rathbone

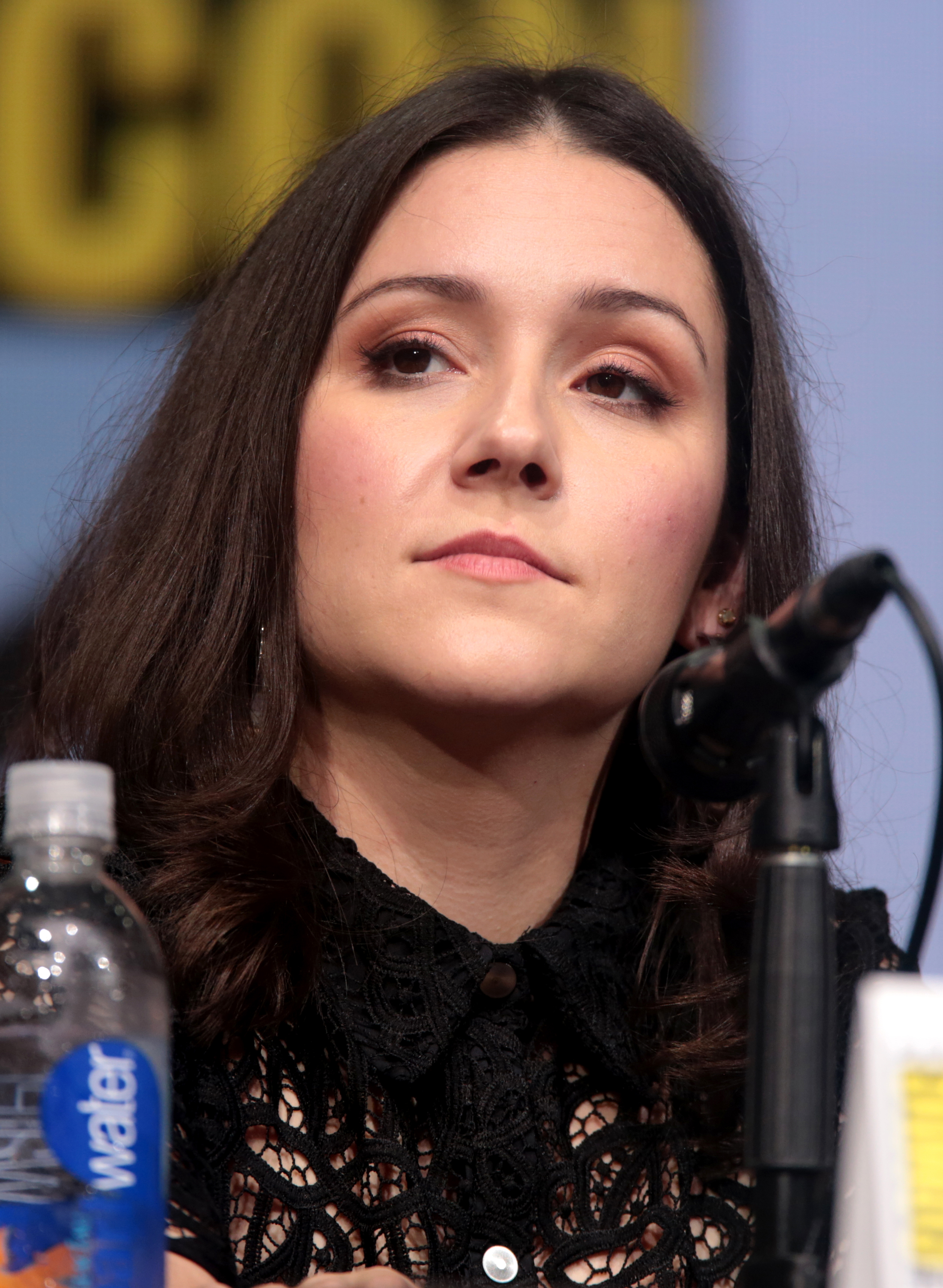
Shannon Woodward

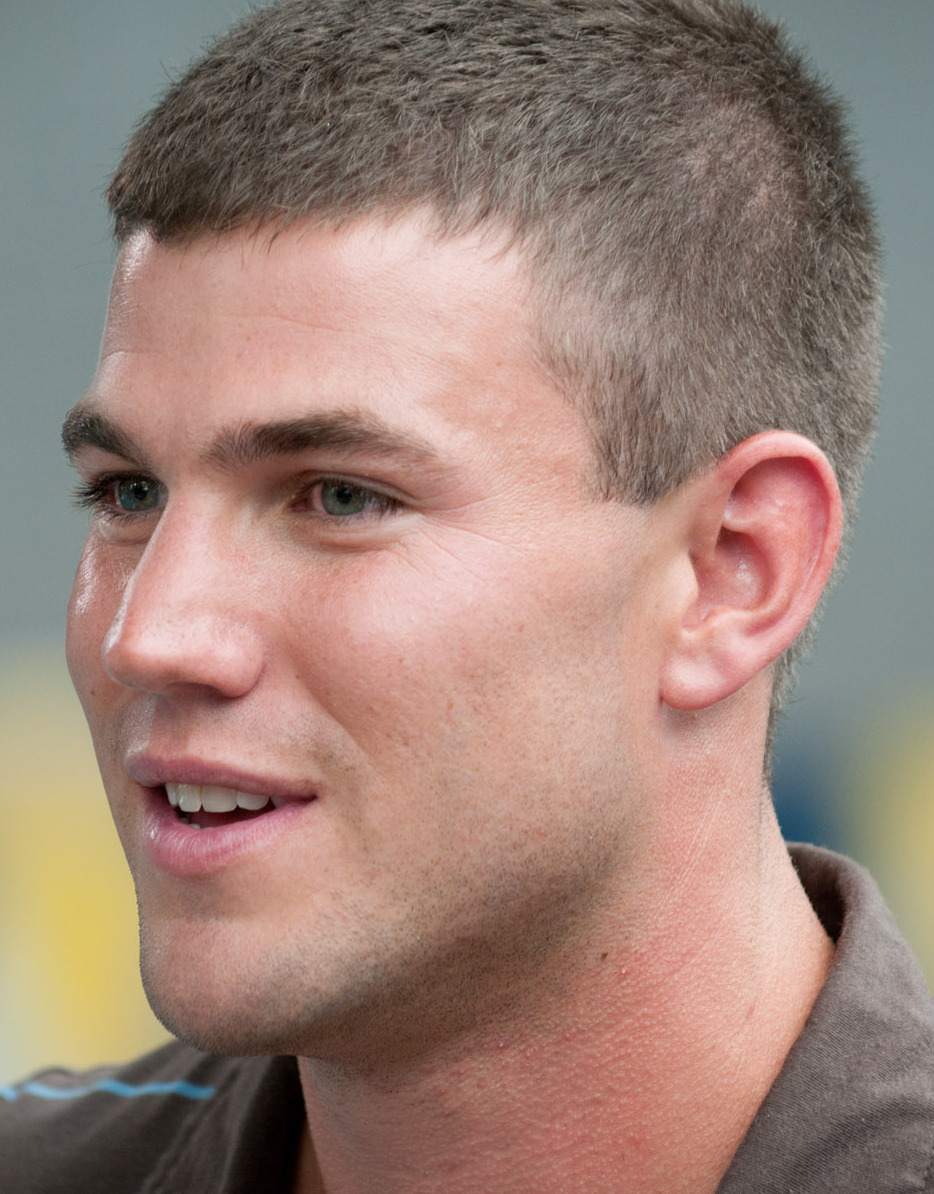
Austin Stowell

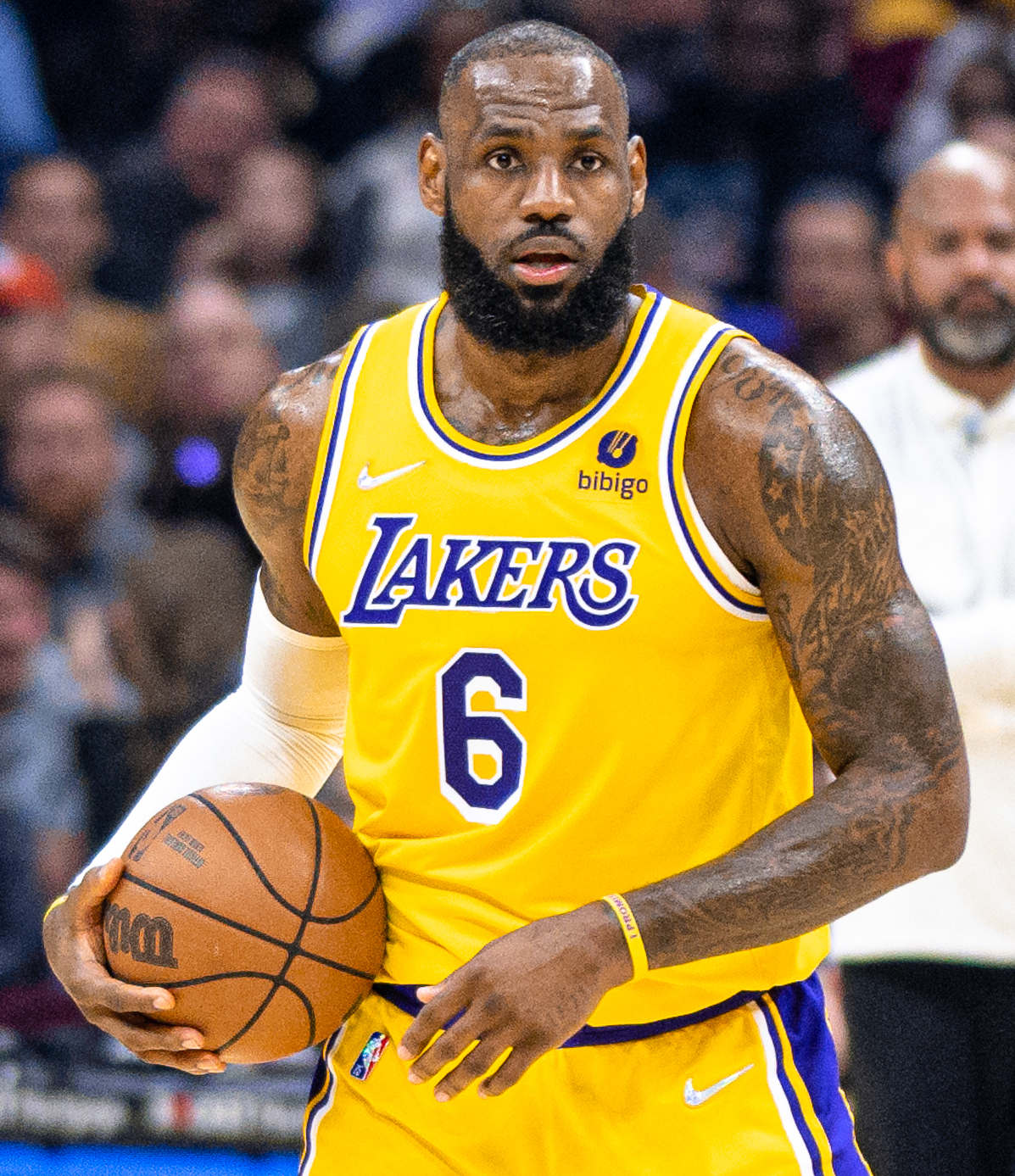
LeBron James

- December 1
  - Ali Almossawi, Bahraini-born author
  - Darren Brazil, editor, producer, and videographer
  - Charles Michael Davis, actor, model, producer, and director
- December 2 – Eric Bakhtiari, football player
- December 3 – Mike Affleck, football player
- December 4
  - Ikaika Alama-Francis, football player
  - Lindsay Felton, actress
  - Jelly Roll, country rapper and singer
  - Brooke Tessmacher, model and wrestler
- December 5
  - Wallace Gilberry, football player
  - Lauren London, actress and model
- December 6 – Whitney Bond, television personality, food blogger, social media consultant, and cookbook author
- December 7 – Mike Baxter, baseball player
- December 8
  - Vince Anderson, football player
  - Sam Hunt, country singer/songwriter
- December 9 – Syed Haris Ahmed, Pakistani-born terrorist
- December 10
  - Brian Boner, politician
  - JTG, wrestler
  - Billy Rymer, drummer for The Dillinger Escape Plan
- December 11
  - Josh Butler, baseball player
  - Xosha Roquemore, actress
- December 12
  - Rivington Bruce Bisland III, esports commentator
  - Court McGee, mixed martial artist
- December 14
  - Mike Fuentes, drummer, co-founder of Pierce the Veil
  - Jackson Rathbone, actor and singer
- December 15 – Max Green, singer, bassist for Escape the Fate (2002–2012), and frontman for Violent New Breed
- December 17
  - Bobby East, stock car racing driver (d. 2022)
  - Mikky Ekko, singer
  - Tennessee Thomas, British-born drummer and actor
  - Shannon Woodward, actress
- December 18 – Brian Boyle, ice hockey player
- December 19 – Stacie Chan, actress
- December 20
  - Brian Abraham, baseball coach and executive
  - Kevin Byrne, politician
- December 21 – Sammi Brown, politician
- December 22
  - Brian Butch, basketball player
  - Greg Finley, actor
- December 23
  - Keto Shimizu, screenwriter, producer, and comic book writer
  - Alison Sudol, singer-songwriter and actress (aka A Fine Frenzy)
  - Cary Williams, football player
- December 24
  - Pat Buck, wrestler
  - Austin Stowell, actor
- December 25 – Chris Richard, basketball player
- December 26 – Jenny Shakeshaft, actress and model
- December 27
  - Desiree Akhavan, director, producer, screenwriter, and actress
  - Amanda Bouldin, politician
  - Tye'sha Fluker, basketball player
- December 28
  - Matt Bessette, mixed martial artist
  - Barret Browning, baseball player
- December 29
  - 38 Spesh, rapper and producer
  - Alan Branch, football player
- December 30 – LeBron James, basketball player

=== Full date unknown ===
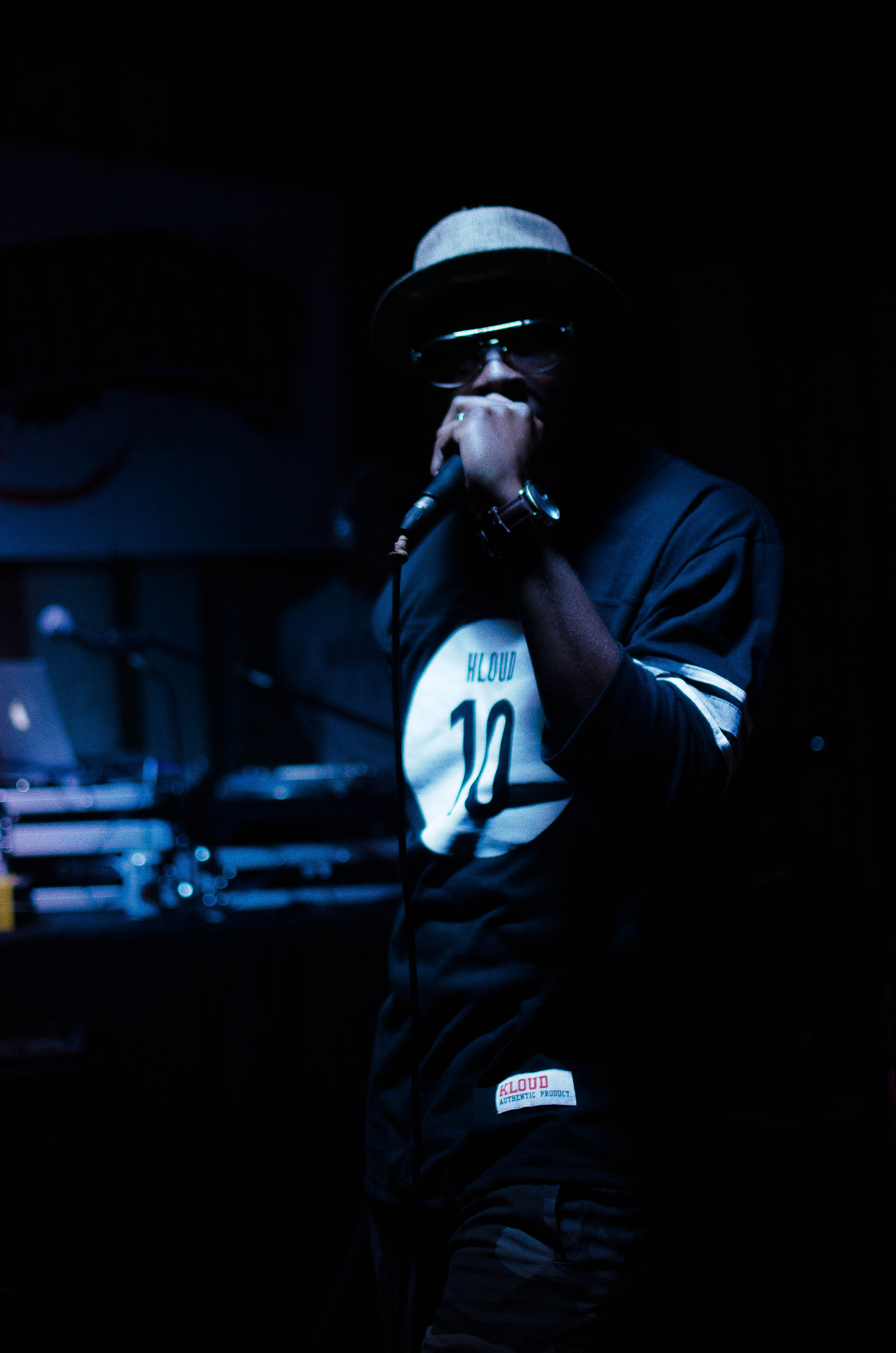
Eric Biddines

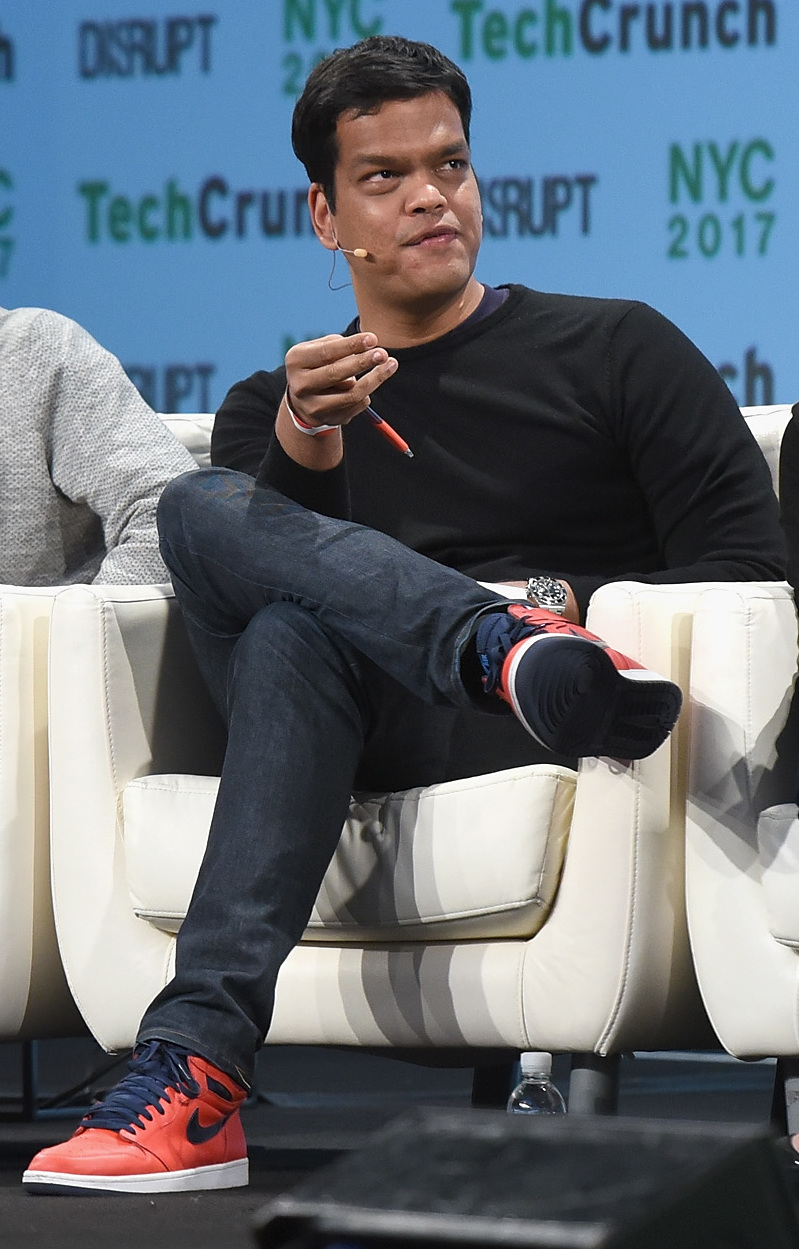
Sriram Krishnan

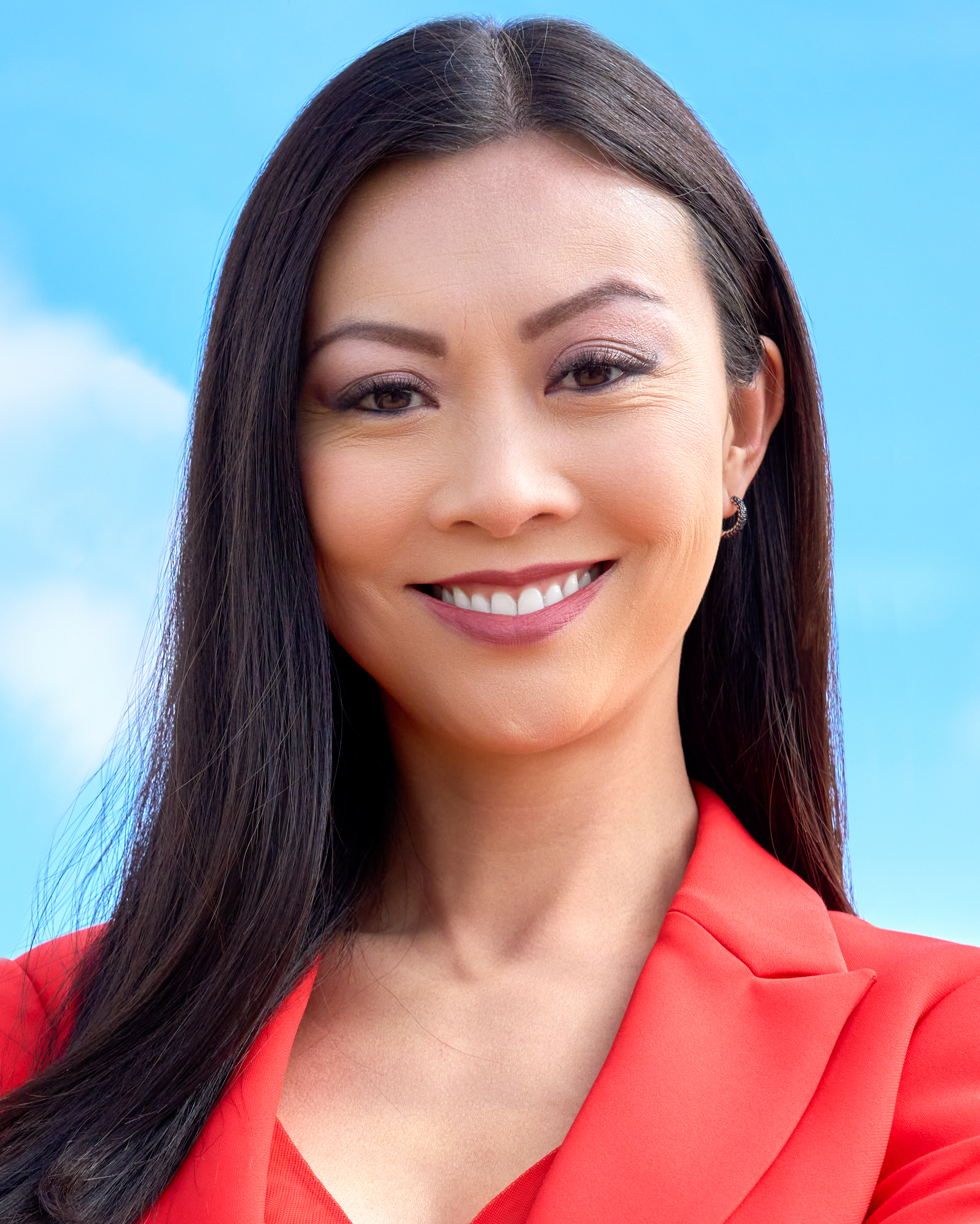
Lily Wu

- Maneet Ahuja, author, journalist, television news producer, and hedge fund specialist
- Hyder Akbar, Pakistani-born Afghan-American writer and entrepreneur
- Kai Altair, singer/songwriter
- Chino Amobi, experimental electronic musician, contemporary artist, and director
- Olga Balema, Ukrainian-born artist and sculptor
- Sarah Ballard, University professor
- Bobby Barbier, baseball coach
- Sadie Barnette, artist
- Abigail Barrows, marine research scientist
- Chloë Bass, artist
- Jessie Baylin, singer/songwriter
- Adam Becker, astrophysicist, author, and scientific philosopher
- Josh Begley, digital artist
- Kenan Bell, hip hop artist and teacher
- Genevieve Belleveau, artist
- Robert Jackson Bennett, writer
- Diana Campbell Betancourt, curator
- Eric Biddines, rapper, vocalist, and record producer
- Sarah Blake, poet
- Cristine Brache, artist, filmmaker, and writer
- Rinat Brodach, Israeli-born fashion designer
- Robert Burke, screenwriter, producer, and director
- Nia Burks, artist
- Benjamin A. Burtt, sound editor
- Jake Chapman, politician
- Sriram Krishnan, Indian-born venture capitalist, podcaster, product manager, and author
- Lily Wu, politician, mayor of Wichita, Kansas (2024–present)

== Deaths ==
- January 14 – Ray Kroc, businessman and founder of McDonald's (b. 1902)
- January 20 – Johnny Weissmuller, swimmer and actor (b. 1904 in Austria-Hungary)
- January 21 – Jackie Wilson, singer-songwriter (b. 1934)
- February 10 – David Von Erich, professional wrestler (b. 1958)
- February 12 – Elmer Keith, rancher, author, and firearms enthusiast (b. 1899)
- February 15
  - Avon Long, actor and singer (b. 1910)
  - Ethel Merman, actress and singer (b. 1908)
- February 16 ― Kenny Williams, game show announcer (b. 1914)
- February 22 – David Vetter, plastic bubble patient (b. 1971)
- March 1 – Jackie Coogan, actor and comedian (b. 1914)
- March 5 – William Powell, actor (b. 1892)
- March 9 – Hannah Weinstein, journalist, political activist and television producer (b. 1911)
- March 10 – June Marlowe, actress (b. 1903)
- March 15 – Ken Carpenter, Olympic discus thrower (b. 1913)
- March 17 – Paul Woolley, pastor and historian. (b. 1902)
- March 18
  - Charley Lau, baseball player (b. 1933)
  - Paul Francis Webster, lyricist (b. 1907)
- March 20 – Stan Coveleski, baseball player, member of the MLB Hall of Fame (b. 1889)
- March 21 – Sam Jaffe, actor, teacher, musician and engineer (b. 1891)
- March 23 – Shauna Grant, porn actress (b. 1963)
- March 27 – Jack Donohue, film screenwriter and director (b. 1908)
- March 28
  - Ben Washam, animator (b. 1915)
  - Benjamin Mays, Baptist minister and civil rights leader (b. 1894)
- April 1 – Marvin Gaye, singer-songwriter and musician (b. 1939)
- April 14 – Anders Haugen, ski jumper (b. 1888)
- April 22 – Ansel Adams, landscape photographer and environmentalist (b. 1902)
- April 26 – Count Basie, pianist, organist, bandleader and composer (b. 1904)
- May 2
  - Jack Barry, game show host a television personality (b. 1918)
  - Bob Clamplett, animator director, producer and puppeteer (b. 1913)
- May 6 – Mary Cain, newspaper editor and politician (b. 1904)
- May 16
  - Andy Kaufman, entertainer and actor (b. 1949)
  - Irwin Shaw, author (b. 1913)
- May 20
  - Ernest H. Dervishian, army colonel (b. 1917)
  - Bill Holland, professional racer (b. 1907)
- May 21
  - Andrea Leeds, film actress (b. 1913)
  - Ann Little, actress (b. 1891)
- May 22 – John Marley, actor and theater director (b. 1907)
- May 24 – Vincent J. McMahon, wrestling promoter (b. 1914)
- May 28 – D’Urville Martin, actor and director (b. 1939)
- June 15 – Meredith Willson, flutist, composer, conductor, musical arranger, bandleader and playwright (b. 1902)
- June 16 – Lew Andreas, basketball coach (b. 1895)
- June 27 – Oswald Jacoby, bridge player (b. 1902)
- June 30 – Lillian Hellman, playwright (b. 1905)
- July 8 – Christine McIntyre, actress and singer (b. 1911)
- July 14 – Philippe Wynne, singer (b. 1941)
- July 19 – Harry Stockwell, actor and singer (b. 1902)
- July 26
  - George Gallup, statistician, creator of the Gallup poll (b. 1901)
  - Ed Gein, murderer (b. 1906)
- July 27 – C. L. Franklin, Baptist minister and civil rights activist (b. 1915)
- July 29 – Fred Waring, musician, bandleader and personality (b. 1900)
- July 31 – Bill Raisch, dancer, stuntman and actor (b. 1905)
- August 4
  - Walter Burke, actor (b. 1908)
  - Mary Miles Minter, actress (b. 1902)
- August 8 – Richard Deacon, actor (b. 1922)
- August 9 – Walter Tevis, author and screenwriter (b. 1928)
- August 11 – Alfred A. Knopf Sr., publisher (b. 1892)
- August 12 – Lenny Breau, guitarist (b. 1941)
- August 22 – Charley Foy, actor (b. 1898)
- August 25
  - Truman Capote, writer (b. 1924)
  - Waite Hoyt, baseball player (b. 1899)
- August 26 – Julie Stevens, actress (b. 1916)
- August 31 – Edward J. York, air force colonel, participant of the Doolittle Raid during World War II (b. 1912)
- September 6 – Ernest Tubb, singer-songwriter (b. 1914)
- September 14 – Janet Gaynor, actress (b. 1906)
- September 17 – Richard Basehart, actor (b. 1914)
- September 20 – Steve Goodman, country singer-songwriter (b. 1948)
- September 24 – Neil Hamilton, actor (b. 1899)
- September 25 – Walter Pidgeon, actor (b. 1897 in Canada)
- September 28 – Roy Sullivan, park ranger, world record holder for lightning strikes survived (b. 1912)
- October 1 – Billy Goodman, baseball player (b. 1926)
- October 18 – Jon-Erik Hexum, actor and model (b. 1957)
- October 24 – Edith Massey, actress and singer (b. 1918)
- October 26 – Sue Randall, actress (b. 1935)
- November 1
  - Paul Baldacci, American football player and coach (b. 1907)
  - Norman Krasna, filmmaker and playwright (b. 1909)
- November 2
  - Velma Barfield, convicted serial killer, execution by lethal injection (b. 1932)
  - Max Leon, impresario (b. 1904)
- November 3 – David Chávez, politician and judge (b. 1897)
- November 4 – Merie Earle, actress (b. 1889)
- November 7 – Howard C. Davidson, major general in the United States Army Air Forces (b. 1890)
- November 10 – Sudie Bond, actress, (b. 1923)
- November 11
  - Dorothy M. Johnson, Western fiction writer (b. 1905)
  - Martin Luther King Sr., Baptist pastor and missionary, activist for the civil rights movement (b. 1899)
- November 12 – Jack Wrather, petroleum businessman and television producer (b. 1918)
- November 13 – Dorothy Arnold, actress (b. 1917)
- November 16
  - Murray Alper, actor (b. 1904)
  - Vic Dickenson, jazz trombonist (b. 1906)
- November 18 – Mary Hamman, writer and editor (b. 1907)
- November 19 – George Aiken, politician and horticulturist (b. 1892)
- November 23 – J. Waldo Ackerman, lawyer and judge (b. 1926)
- November 28 – Paul F. Yount, United States Army general (b. 1908)
- November 29 – Nora Thompson Dean, Indigenous American (Lenape) linguist (b. 1907)
- December 1 – Wayland Becker, American football player (b. 1910)
- December 2 – Charley Mehelich, American football player (b. 1922)
- December 3 – Virginia Lacy Jones, librarian (b. 1912)
- December 4 – Leila Cook Barber, art historian (b. 1903)
- December 5 – Cecil M. Harden, politician, member of the U.S. House of Representatives, cancer (b. 1894)
- December 6 – Gray Barker, ufologist (b. 1925)
- December 7
  - Jeanne Cagney, actress, lung cancer (b. 1919)
  - Jack Mercer, voice actor, animator and screenwriter (b. 1910)
  - LeeRoy Yarbrough, stock race-car driver (b. 1938)
- December 8 – Luther Adler, actor (b. 1903)
- December 9 – David Dietz, science journalist, Parkinson's disease (b. 1897)
- December 16 – Wilson Rawls, writer (b. 1913)
- December 21 – J. Roderick MacArthur, businessman and philanthropist (b. 1920)
- December 24 – Peter Lawford, actor (b. 1923)
- December 28 – Sam Peckinpah, director and filmmaker (b. 1925)

== See also ==
- 1984 in American television
- List of American films of 1984
- Timeline of United States history (1970–1989)
