= Foodgasm =

Pleasurable satisfaction from eating

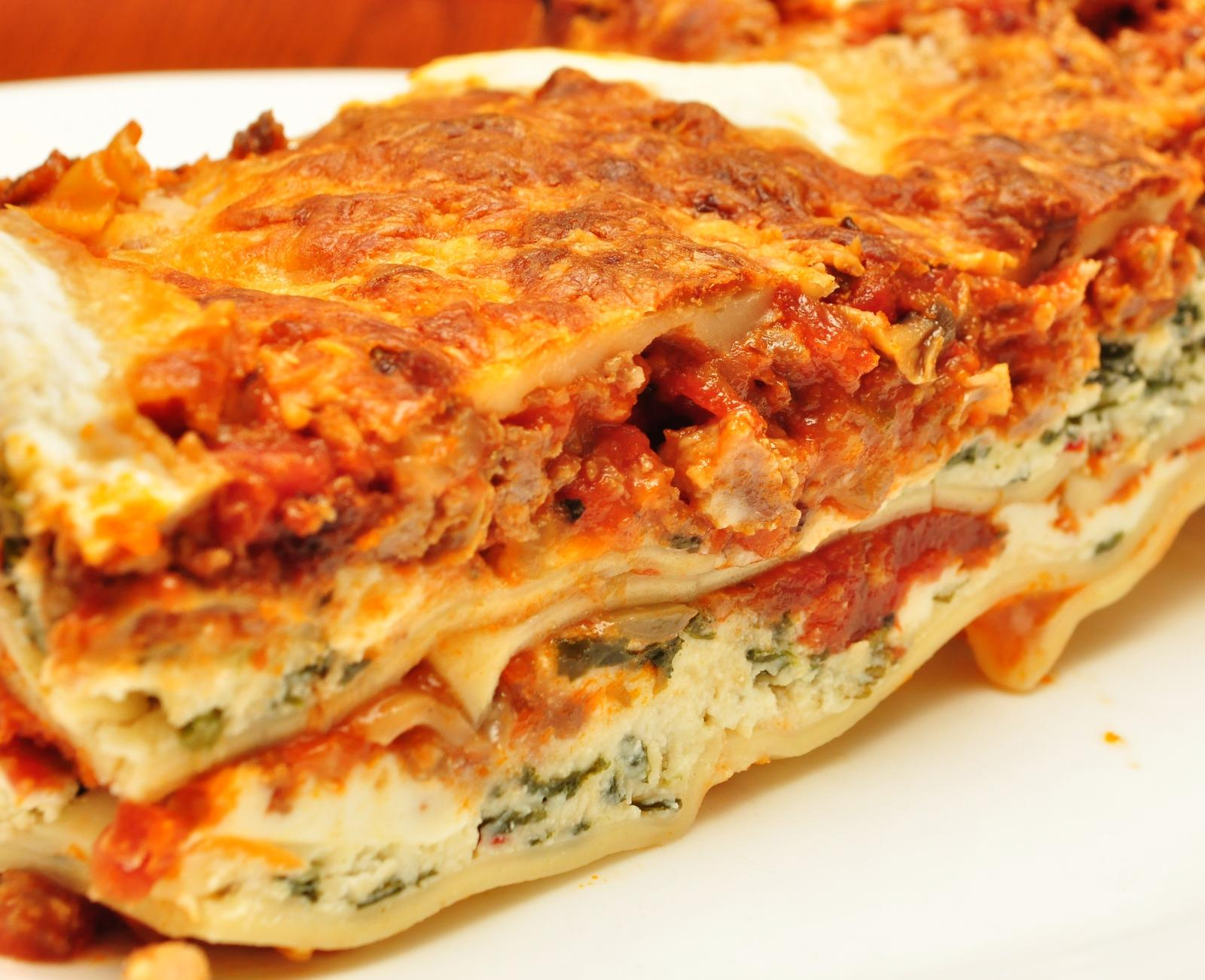
An appetizing lasagne

Foodgasm (from the words "food" and "orgasm") is a neologism that indicates a pleasurable and euphoric feeling of satisfaction that occurs during the consumption of particularly amazing and delicious foods: this pleasure is sometimes accompanied by vocal noises (e.g. moans, sighs, screams of joy and happiness) and a variety of facial expressions.

In a linguistic aspect, Jurado (2018) discusses as follows: "the sequence '-gasm' does not reproduce the original meaning of orgasm in different groups of words in the corpus, but a slight variation. This element is used with the meaning of 'a feeling of excitement or enthusiasm', produced by the first element of the blend such as eargasm, infogasm or oreogasm". The term dates from the 2010s.

== Pornographic metaphor ==
In the word foodgasm, the sexual referral is implicit. Seeing food presented in an appetizing and "ready to be eaten" manner allows the brains of the viewer to vividly imagine the consumption experience related to eating what they see. This is what creates the pathway to get an actual foodgasm. Looking at pictures of food is known to trigger gustatory sensations in the brain, and to often trigger the desire to consume.

The popular origin of the terms coincides with the proliferation of food television over the course of the 1990s. Editing styles and emotionally-loaded close-up cinematography, for instance, produce much of the sentimentality they seem to reflect.

Foodporn is linked to unctuous foods represented in very attractive ways. On the other hand a foodgasm is more the physical pleasure made in response to eating, represented through images of closed, rolling or fluttering eyes, arched back or head, puckered lips or open inviting mouths.

Foodporn related images are enticing yet deceptive, generating a plentiful spectacle of unsubstantial consumption while Foodgasm is the direct consequence of hyper realized consumption.

== Consumer culture ==
Food is considered a consumer material object but it is also a cultural dimension evident in the process of objectification through which people create themselves, their identities, social affiliations, relationships and practices in everyday life. Food is the most common way of consumption in our contemporary society and it can be found in different spheres of the society.

=== Food advertising ===
Through the use of new media advertisement, food and culinary industries try to send a message that makes people willing to spread the word about the products considered. The term "foodgasm" is used to spectacularize moments of eating pleasure; indeed it stimulates the nerves, the senses, and the pleasure center of the brain. Television food commercials do not simply rely on the "work of watching" (Jhally and Livant 124), but they mobilize future action by the spectator in the form of consumption (buying and eating). In this way the food orgasm is a channel to the body of the viewer, a commercial practice of sensory transmission in an effort to physically awaken a drive to buy. Foodgasm discourses position food as an opiate for the masses and consumption as a potential source of autonomy. Food advertising can have psychological consequences on consumers and particularly children, who are more susceptible to irresponsible reactions; it can influence people on an emotional level. They may associate food with specific feelings: peace, relax, happiness, satisfaction and this can originate addiction and obesity.

=== Culinary tourism ===
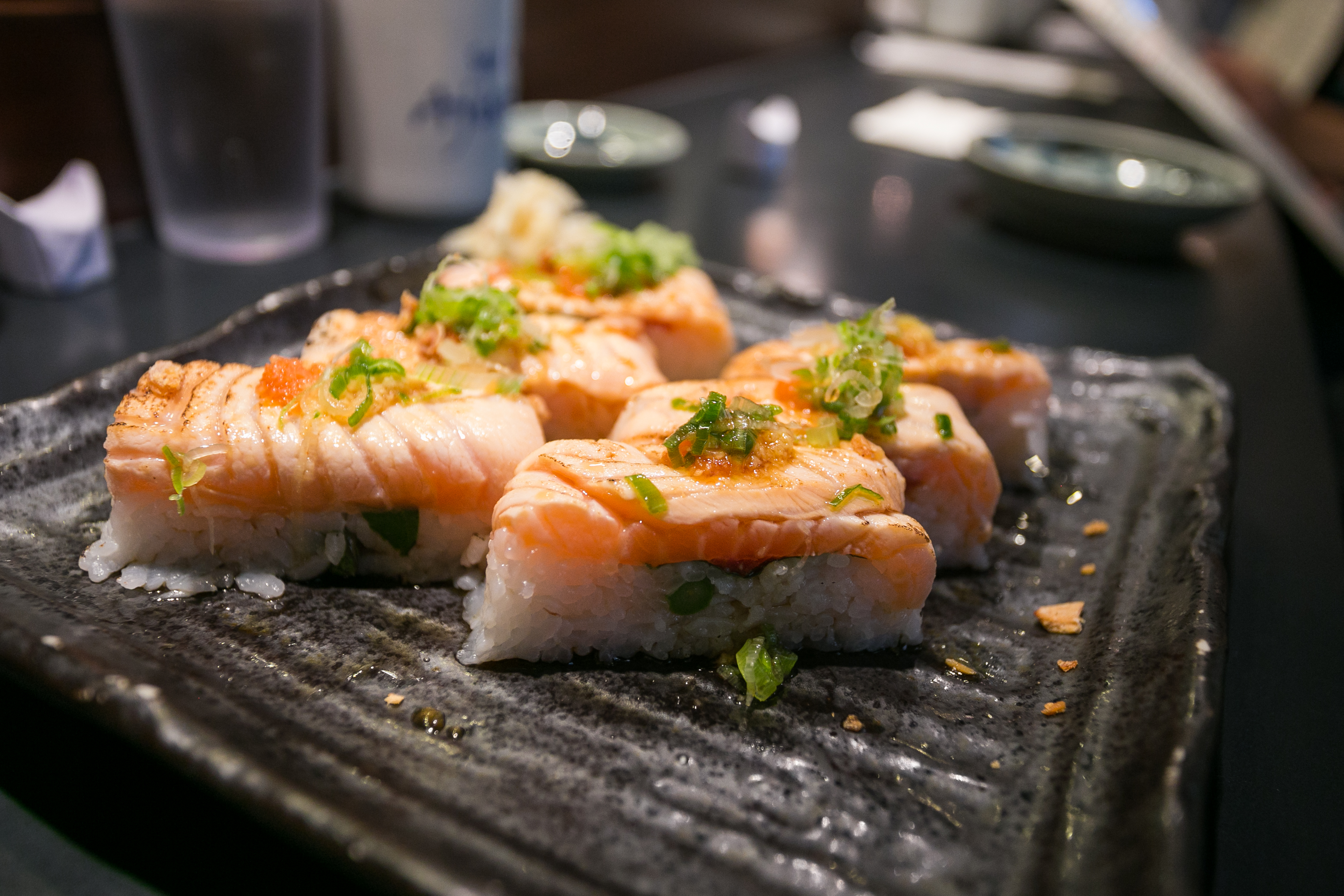
Typical Japanese food

Food representation via social media has created a phenomenon among pop culture that defines the consumption of food and drink related to culinary tourism: culinary and food tourism is a world travel trend because this type of travel offers not only the memory of food but also the rich storytelling traditions of indigenous peoples. This phenomenon is strictly linked to the culture of tourists: they travel to discover new places and cultures, use often these terms to show the varieties of food they taste in their destinations and to share them with other people, in order to make them travel around the world and to make them taste different flavors than they might have otherwise.

== See also ==
- Food and sexuality
- Food blogging
- Food photography
