= Whitney Bond =

American food personality (born 1984)

- Born: Whitney Michele Bond; December 6, 1984 (age 41); Oklahoma City, Oklahoma, U.S.
- Education: San Diego State University
- Culinary career
- Cooking style: American, Tex-Mex
- Website: www.whitneybond.com

Whitney Michele Bond (born December 6, 1984) is an American television food personality, food blogger, social media consultant, and cookbook author.

She is the primary blogger and photographer of the food blog WhitneyBond.com - Traditional Recipes with a Bond Girl Twist, host of multiple cooking web series, recipe and cooking trends segment regular on local and nationwide television shows, and is also a published cookbook author.

== Early life ==
Bond was born on December 6, 1984, in Oklahoma City, Oklahoma, and grew up in Edmond, Oklahoma. She is the only daughter of Bill and Muffet Bond. Bond has one brother, Tyler Bond. She moved to San Diego, California, in 2003 and started her first business in 2006, a promotional modeling agency called Simple Glam Girls, and expanded that into a print modeling agency called SG Model Management in 2008. In January 2010 she moved to Los Angeles, California, to focus on her modeling career and during her 2½ years there she started food blogging.

== Career ==
Bond knew at a young age that she wanted to move to California and begin a modeling career. While working on her modeling career and her modeling businesses, Bond kept a journal of her time in Los Angeles that included stories, notes on Hollywood show business, and recipes that she created along the way to share with her friends. She learned to cook from her family and her ability to put her own twist on recipes earned her the reputation of inventive recipe developer. She became known as the Little Leopard Girl because her journal had a leopard print on the outside. This then became the title of her food blog. In 2012 she moved back to San Diego to focus on her food blog.

=== Food blog ===
Bond is the creator of WhitneyBond.com, a San Diego–based food blog focused on variations of classic American, Southern Californian, Baja-Style Mexican, and Tex-Mex recipes that Bond creates. Her blog was originally entitled Little Leopard Book in reference to her leopard-covered notebook where she'd create her new recipes. Bond and her blog have been featured on television shows across the country, such as Fox's Morning Blend and San Diego Living on San Diego 6 in San Diego. Her food blog is also regularly featured on social media, Podcasts, and other blogs. Bond's blog focuses on her original recipes based on the season, sponsored posts, restaurant reviews, and food-related themes in general. She also focuses blog themes on traditional American and new rendez-vous holidays, such as Thanksgiving, Christmas, and even Friendsgiving.

=== Apps ===
Bond released the Amazon Alexa Skill Whitney Bond's Recipe Search in 2016 that allows users to search her blog and the Internet for specific or themed recipes. The skill also allows users to select a recipe and Alexa will walk them through the process of making of the recipe with the ability to list out the ingredients. Other features include recipe selection for undecided users, emailed results with links and images, and themed recipes by cuisine, diet, holiday, cooking tool, etc.

=== Books ===
Bond wrote her cookbook, Buffalo Style: Ditch the Wings, Keep the Sauce, in 2013. The book aims to diversify the readers' use of buffalo sauce away from just being a sauce for chicken wings. The book features recipes that infuse buffalo sauce into traditional favorites such as enchiladas, lasagna, macaroni and cheese, meatloaf, and pasta, among others.

=== Online contributions/web series ===
Bond has hosted multiple cooking web series, has been highlighted in other web series, and has contributed to website content for outlets such as Yahoo!, the Huffington Post, and BuzzFeed. She hosts her own WhitneyBond.com Cooking and San Diego Restaurants web series along with Grokker's and San Diego Union Tribune's online cooking web series. She launched a new series 29 Minute Meals in 2017 focusing on how to make delicious recipes in 29 minutes or less. Then, at the end of every episode she delivers her "Whitney's One Minute of Fun."

=== Television appearances ===
Bond has appeared live in studio, live via satellite, and via taped segments on multiple television shows and is a regular contributor on San Diego 6's San Diego Living morning show. Bond presents her recipes in topical formats such as gluten free recipes, paleo diet recipes, and special event recipes for events such as the Super Bowl and Cinco de Mayo. Bond also hosts satellite media tours where she is featured on multiple television shows nationwide sponsoring products and recommending recipes that incorporate these products.

=== Social media ===
Bond regularly contributes to Facebook, Twitter, Instagram, and Pinterest and is viewed as an expert and social media influencer and regularly consults with other social media outlets.

== Bibliography ==
- Buffalo Style: Ditch the Wings, Keep the Sauce (ISBN 1629021997, 2013)
