= Raúl Ramírez (disambiguation) =

Raúl Ramírez (born 1953) is a retired Mexican professional tennis player.

Raúl Ramírez may also refer to:

- Raúl Ramírez (actor) (1927–2014), Mexican actor
- Raul Ramirez (journalist) (1946–2013), Cuban American journalist
- Raul Anthony Ramirez (born 1944), former United States federal judge
- Raúl Zerimar Ramírez (born 1994), Mexican footballer
- Raúl Gómez Ramírez (1964–2014), Mexican politician
