= Meike Peters =

German author

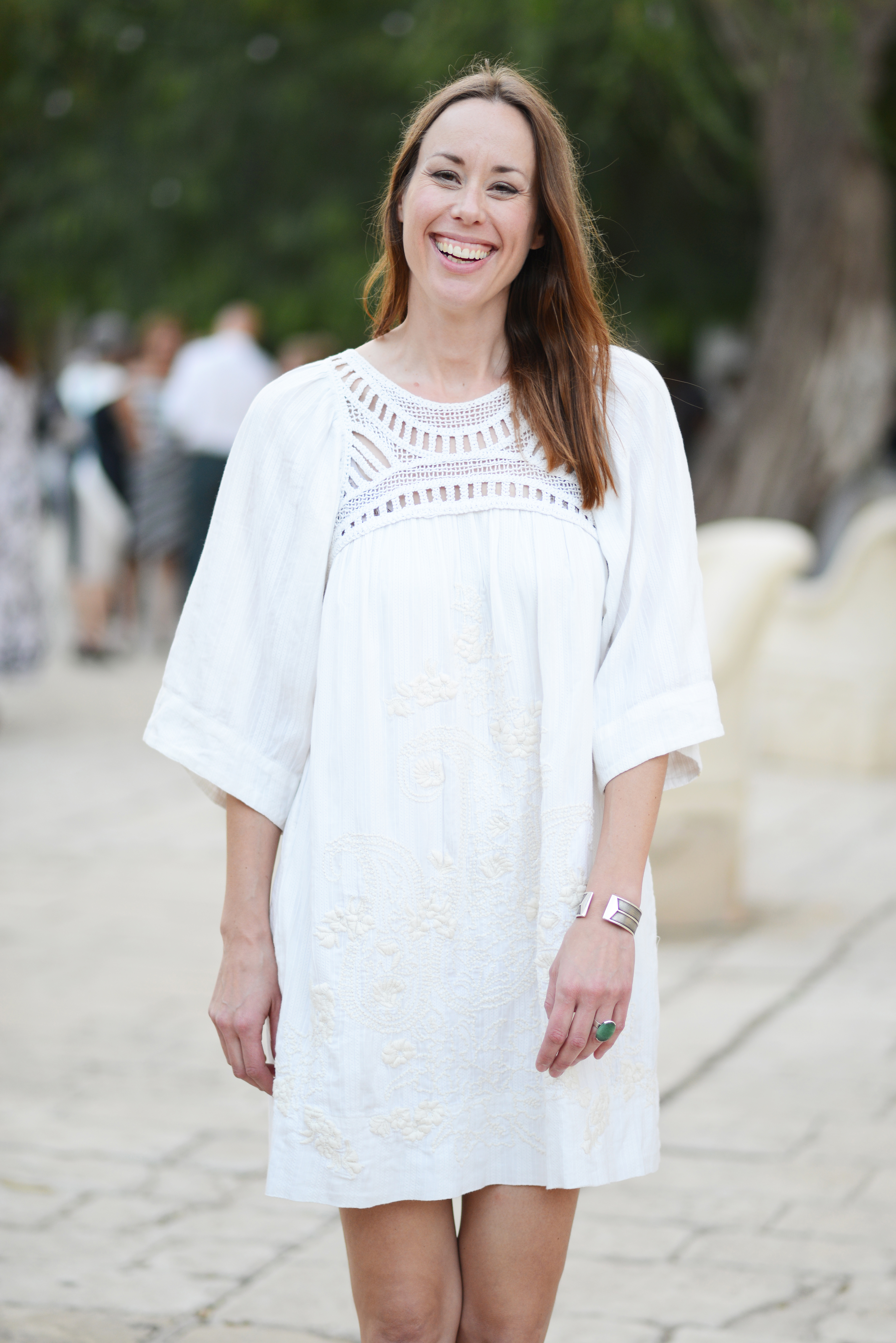
Meike Peters

Meike Peters is a James Beard Award-winning German cookbook author, blogger, podcaster, food and travel writer and photographer. She is the author of Eat In My Kitchen, published by Prestel Publishing (Penguin Random House) in October 2016 in English and in German and winner of the 2017 James Beard Foundation Book Award for General Cooking, and 365: A Year of Everyday Cooking and Baking, published in October 2019, a collection of 365 of her recipes for every day of the year. Both of her books were included in The New York Times Best Cookbook lists for Fall 2019 and Fall 2016. Her third book is called Noon, published in 2023 by Chronicle Books (English) and Prestel (German), and winner of the 2024 Swiss Cookbook Award and 2024 Gastronomische Akademie Deutschlands GAD Silver Medal. In 2021, she started her Meet in My Kitchen podcast, inviting her guests to her Berlin kitchen (English and German episodes).

She studied architecture but in November 2013, she decided to start her food blog, Eat in My Kitchen, sharing a recipe each day in the first year of her blog. Her recipes combine German and Mediterranean cooking, and Christopher Kimball, Milk Street wrote "if you want to change how you cook—to learn new tricks—I heartily recommend 365. You may find some of her combinations challenging, but your everyday cooking will never be the same." Meike Peters lives in Berlin and spent many years in Malta. Her book 365 is dedicated to the Maltese investigative journalist Daphne Caruana Galizia.

== Awards and recognition ==
- James Beard Award "General Cooking" for Eat in My Kitchen (2017)
- Gourmand Award for 365: A Year of Everyday Cooking and Baking (2020)
- Swiss Gourmet Book Award for NOON (2024)
- Gastronomische Akademie Deutschlands GAD Silver Medal for NOON (2024)

== Published works ==
- Eat in My Kitchen (2016) ISBN 978-3791382005
- 365: A Year of Everyday Cooking and Baking (2019) ISBN 978-3791385112
- NOON: Simple Recipes for Scrumptious Midday Meals and More (2023) ISBN 978-1797222806
