= Food Photographer of the Year =

- Awarded for: Creative excellence in food photography
- Country: Worldwide
- Presented by: The Food Awards Company
- First award: 2012
- Website: FoodPhotographerofTheYear.co.uk

Food Photographer of the Year is a set of awards presented by The Food Awards Company and title sponsor Pink Lady Apples, given to amateur and professional photographers for excellence in food photography. The Award supports Action Against Hunger, a humanitarian aid organisation specialising in saving the lives of malnourished children in the world's poorest countries, and has also supported the Great Ormond Street Hospital Children's Charity.

== Format ==
The format of the award emphasises a variety of applications of food photography, including portrait, editorial, advertising and personal blogging.

The award's judging panel has comprised notable figures from the photographic and food industries, including Blur bassist Alex James, television presenter and Observer food critic Jay Rayner, chef James Martin as well as restaurateurs Tom Aikens, Antonio Carluccio, Bill Granger and Prue Leith. Categories include: Food and Its Place, for images celebrating food's geographical essence; Food In the Street; Food for Celebration and commemorative categories such as the Philip Harben Award for Food in Action, in memory of Philip Harben, the UK's first TV chef. The 2013 competition received over 5500 entries; the website attracted visits from 140 countries. The Award was created by The Food Awards Company, a food industry events consultancy.

=== Overall Winner 2013 ===
Alexandrina Paduretu – amateur photographer from Romania.

The first prize in 2013 was £5000. Individual category winners receive a trophy, camera equipment and other sponsor-related items. Short-listed entrants have their work displayed at The Mall Galleries prior to the award ceremony, in London, England.

== See also ==
- List of food and drink awards
- Food photography
- Food blogging
