= Russ Parsons =

American food writer and columnist

Russ Parsons is an American food writer and columnist. He served as the food editor and columnist of the Los Angeles Times for more than 25 years before leaving in 2015. He has written about food for more than 30 years, including his career at The Times, where he also served as managing editor and deputy editor. He is the author of the cookbooks How to Read a French Fry and How to Pick a Peach, which were published by Houghton-Mifflin.

In 2008 he was inducted into the James Beard Foundation's Who's Who of Food and Beverage, the hall of fame of American cooking. He has won many food journalism awards, including those from the International Association of Culinary Professionals, the Association of Food Journalists, the James Beard Foundation and the Missouri Lifestyle Journalism Awards. How to Read a French Fry was a finalist for two Julia Child cookbook awards. How to Pick a Peach, published in 2007, was named one of the best 100 books of the year by both Publishers Weekly and Amazon.

Before coming to The Times, he was food editor at the Los Angeles Times Syndicate, food editor at the Los Angeles Herald Examiner and food editor at the Albuquerque Tribune. Parsons has been a journalist for more than 30 years, covering everything from high school football and professional rodeo to cops and courts and country music.

He is cousin to author Jennifer Crusie.

He has a wife and one daughter.

He has lived in Waterford, Ireland since 2019.

== Bibliography ==
- How to Read a French Fry: And Other Stories of Intriguing Kitchen Science (ISBN 0-618-37943-6, 2003)
- How to Pick a Peach: The Search for Flavor from Farm to Table
