= Mecklin =

Mecklin is a surname. Notable people with the surname include:

- John Mecklin (1918–1971), American journalist and diplomat
- John Mecklin (journalist) (fl. 1984), American journalist, novelist, and editor

== See also ==
- Macklin (surname)
