= Carol Krucoff =

American newspaper journalist and author

Carol Krucoff is an American newspaper journalist and author. She has interviewed multiple people, and written books about health.

== Career ==
Krucoff wrote an employee newsletter for The Washington Post, and later founded the health section of the newspaper. Some of Krucoff's interviews were with Mikhail Baryshnikov, Nastassia Kinski, and Arnold Schwarzenegger. She wrote a fitness column titled "Body Works". Her short story "French Twist" received third place in a contest that was held by a local magazine. She was awarded the Psychiatric Institute Achievement Award in 1980 for writing about mental health. Krucoff became Washington Post-Duke University Fellow in 1982. In 1986, Krucoff won at the Missouri Lifestyle Journalism Awards for writing a section about acquired immune deficiency syndrome.

Krucoff co-wrote the book Healing Moves with her husband Mitchell Krucoff, in which they detail how various health conditions can be avoided by exercising. According to Krucoff, this was the first book for average people to read about all of the studies involving physical activity's relation to health. Krucoff said that there was a void without the book, and that she wanted to "fill it". Her other books include Yoga Sparks: 108 Easy Practices for Stress Relief in a Minute or Less and Yoga for Neck and Shoulder Pain, and Relax into Yoga for Seniors: A Six Week Program for Strength, Balance, Flexibility and Pain Relief (co-authored with Kimberly Carson).

Krucoff is also a yoga instructor, karate second degree black belt, and a karate sensei. She works at Duke Integrative Medicine in Duke University, and co-directs the Integrative Yoga for Seniors teacher training.
