= Carol Sutton =

Carol Sutton may refer to:

- Carol Sutton (actress)
- Carol Sutton (journalist)
- Carol Sutton (artist)
