= Marian Burros =

American cookbook author (1933–2025)

- Born: Marian Jewel Fox; June 12, 1933; Waterbury, Connecticut, U.S.
- Died: September 20, 2025 (aged 92); Bethesda, Maryland, U.S.
- Education: Wellesley College
- Occupation: Food columnist
- Years active: 1954–2014
- Spouse: Donald Burros (m. 1959; died 1991)
- Children: 2

Marian Jewel Burros (née Fox; June 12, 1933 – September 20, 2025) was an American cookbook author and a food columnist for The New York Times, a position she held from 1981 to 2014. Before joining The Times, Burros was The Washington Post's food editor and a consumer reporter for WRC-TV, the NBC-owned station in Washington, a position for which she won an Emmy Award.

Burros also worked for NBC Radio Network News, United Features, The Washington Daily News, and The Washington Star.

== Early life ==
Burros was born Marian Jewel Fox in Waterbury, Connecticut, on June 12, 1933. After her father, Myron, a doctor, died when Marian was five, she was raised by her mother, Dorothy (Derby) Fox, who was of Russian Jewish descent and worked as a comptroller for various companies. When Marian was 14, her mother remarried, to grocery chain store owner Charles Greenblatt. Marian graduated with a degree in English literature from Wellesley College in 1954. After an early marriage ended in divorce, she wed Donald Burros in 1959.

== Career ==
With her friend Lois Levine, Burros self-published Elegant but Easy in 1954—a cookbook that they printed on a mimeograph machine and sold in local bookstores, as well as Wellesley College clubs nationwide. It was picked up by Macmillan Publishing in 1960 and eventually sold 500,000 copies.

In 1968, Burros became the editor of the food section at The Washington Star, where she emphasized the role politics can play in food through federal decisions impacting food safety regulations. From 1969 until 1974, she had a syndicated column through United Features, titled "Chef Marian's Dish of the Day," after which she became food editor for The Washington Post (1974 to 1981). She joined The New York Times in 1981. Her most famous recipe was for a plum torte: upon its first publication in the Times in 1983, it proved so popular that it was reprinted annually until 1989 to meet reader demand. It was adapted from a recipe by Lois Levine which appeared in Elegant but Easy. In 2016, the Times said the plum torte was "the most requested recipe, and among the most beloved, in the history of the newspaper".

Burros is credited as one of the pioneering food writers, of the 1970s, for having applied investigative journalistic standards to the field. She was the first to break the story of ITT Continental Baking Company's reduced-calorie, high-fiber Fresh Horizons Bread, which contained powdered cellulose, derived from wood pulp. In 1974, she was a founding member and first vice-president of the Association of Food Journalists, an organization formed to set standards of journalistic objectivity for food writers.

== Personal life and death ==
Burros had a son from her first marriage and a daughter from her second. Her second husband, Donald Burros, died from pancreatic cancer in 1991, at the age of 64.

Burros lived in Bethesda, Maryland, and died from a heart attack at a hospital there, on September 20, 2025, at the age of 92.

== Awards ==
Burros won numerous awards, including an Emmy in 1973 for her consumer reporting on WRC-TV; the American Association of University Women Mass Media Award for consumer reporting and nutrition education; a 1988 citation from the National Press Club for her coverage of food safety issues in The Times; and a Penney-Missouri Award. Her cookbooks and feature writing won five James Beard Foundation awards.

She received a National Press Club citation (for food safety coverage), the American Association of University Women Mass Media Award and was a three-time winner of the Vesta Award.

Even after retiring, Burros continued to garner recognition for her career of reporting on the politics of food, health, nutrition, agriculture, and food safety. The honors she received included the Wellesley College Alumnae Achievement award in 2016 and the Association of Food Journalists Award in 2017.

== Books ==
- Elegant But Easy (Collier Books, 1962) with Lois Levine
- Second Helpings (Collier Books, 1964) with Lois Levine
- Freeze With Ease (MacMillan, 1967) with Lois Levine
- Come for Cocktails, Stay for Supper (MacMillan, 1970)
- Summertime Cookbook (MacMillan, 1972) Tastemaker Award winner
- Pure and Simple (William Morrow, 1978) Tastemaker Award winner
- Keep It Simple (William Morrow, 1981)
- You've Got It Made (William Morrow, 1984)
- The Best of De Gustibus (Simon & Schuster, 1988)
- 20-Minute Menus (Simon & Schuster, 1989)
- Eating Well is the Best Revenge (Simon & Schuster, 1995)
- Cooking for Comfort (Simon & Schuster, 209 pp, 2003)
- The New Elegant But Easy Cookbook (Simon and Schuster, 2003)
