= Benedict Carey =

American journalist

- Born: Benedict James Carey; March 3, 1960 (age 66); San Francisco, California, United States
- Occupation: journalist
- Notable credit(s): Los Angeles Times; The New York Times
- Spouse: Victoria von Biel
- Children: Isaac, Flora

Benedict Carey (born 3 March 1960) is an American journalist and reporter on medical and science topics for The New York Times.

== Biography ==
Carey was born on 3 March 1960 in San Francisco, and graduated from the University of Colorado with a degree in mathematics in 1983. In 1985 he enrolled in a one-year journalism program at Northwestern University in Evanston, Illinois and in 1987 joined the staff of San Francisco-based medical science magazine Hippocrates.

From 1997 he worked as a freelance journalist in Los Angeles, before securing a position as the health and fitness writer for the Los Angeles Times. A 2002 article on the health effects of drinking eight glasses of water a day won a Missouri Lifestyle Journalism Award.

Since 2004 Carey has worked as a science and medical writer for The New York Times.

He is the author of two science/math adventures for middle-schoolers, one called "Island of the Unknowns;" previously titled "The Unknowns", and "Poison Most Vial". He has also written a book about learning science titled "How We Learn: The Surprising Truth About When, Where, and Why It Happens."

== See also ==
- Science journalism
