= Jackie Summers =

American microdistiller, writer and CEO

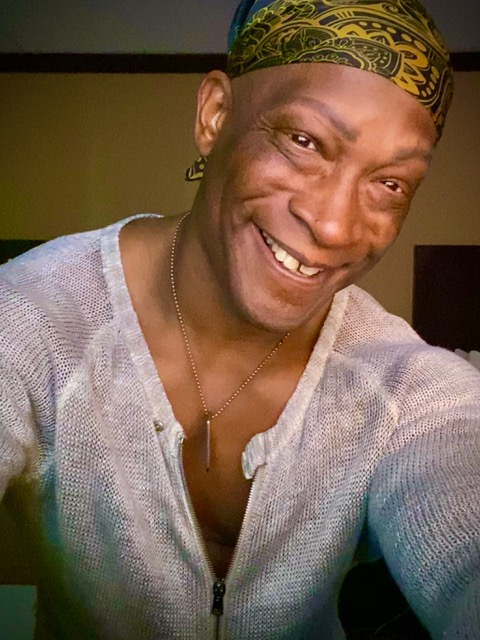
- Born: October 22, 1967 (age 58)
- Occupation(s): CEO, Jack from Brooklyn
- Known for: Sorel Liqueur
- Website: https://jackiesummers.nyc/

Jackie Summers is an American microdistiller, writer and chief executive officer of Jack from Brooklyn. In 2012, he became the first Black person in the United States to be granted a license to make liquor post-Prohibition.

== Early life ==
Summers is of Caribbean descent and is originally from Queens. His grandparents immigrated to the United States from Barbados in the 1920s. According to Summers, "when I was growing up, there was always a pitcher of sorrel, a type of hibiscus tea, in the kitchen. After the kids were in bed, the adults would put a splash of rum in it". Jackie's father was a pianist (playing with Louie Armstrong, Duke Ellington, and Billie Holiday, among others) and his mother worked as a research scientist.

== Career ==
=== Jack from Brooklyn ===
After a cancer diagnosis in 2010 resulting in the removal of a tumor near his spine, Summers resigned from his job as a publishing executive to start Jack from Brooklyn (a nickname of his) to make Sorel Liqueur, a modern version of the roselle-based Caribbean beverage.

In 2012, he became the first Black person in the United States to be granted a license to make liquor. Summers' small-batch sorrel liqueur is a deep garnet color, and along with hibiscus, is also flavored with cloves, cassia, nutmeg and ginger. After the Jack from Brooklyn distillery was damaged in Hurricane Sandy, Sorel relaunched in 2013, operating until Jack from Brooklyn paused production in 2015.

In October 2021, the brand relaunched after an investment from the Uncle Nearest Venture Fund.

=== Other work ===
Before becoming a distiller, Summers worked in magazine publishing. Summers has also written for Edible Brooklyn, Esquire, Wine Enthusiast, and Plate. In 2019, his essay "Rice is at the Intersection of Poverty" was awarded Best Food Essay by the Association of Food Journalists.

In April 2020, during the COVID-19 pandemic, he and Daniella Veras launched a Virtual Happy Hour on Zoom that became popular.

== Recognition ==
In 2014 Brooklyn Magazine named him one of the 50 most influential people in Brooklyn food. He was named to Drinks International's list of the 100 most influential people in the bar world in 2019, 2020, and 2021. In 2019 he won an American Food Journalists award for Best Food Essay for his piece for Plate magazine, "Rice Is at the Overlap for Poverty and Comfort". In 2021 he was named to the Imbibe 75 People to Watch list. In 2022, Summers was named one of Food & Wine's Drinks Innovators of the Year. His Epicurious piece "All the Food You Can Eat and Only the Family You Can Stand" was nominated for a 2022 James Beard Foundation Award.
