= John Pekkanen =

American journalist

John Pekkanen (February 11, 1939 - August 2025) was an author, and two-time National Magazine Award-winning American journalist and the winner of ten other national journalism awards including the National Headliner Award, the Penney-Missouri Award for medical journalism, and the Award of Excellence from the American College of Emergency Physicians.

A former correspondent and bureau chief for Life magazine and a senior writer for Washingtonian, Pekkanen has written for The New Republic, The Atlantic Monthly, Town and Country and was the author of Donor: How One Girl's Death Gave Life to Others; The Best Doctors in the U.S.; Victims: An Account of a Rape; The American Connection - Profiteering and Politicking in the "Ethical" Drug Industry; M. D.: Doctors Talk about Themselves; and My Father, My Son with Admiral Elmo Zumwalt and Lieutenant Elmo Zumwalt. He was also a published poet.

Pekkanen has been a Nieman Fellow at Harvard University. He lives in the Washington, D.C. area.
