= Food photography on social media =

Photographing food before eating it

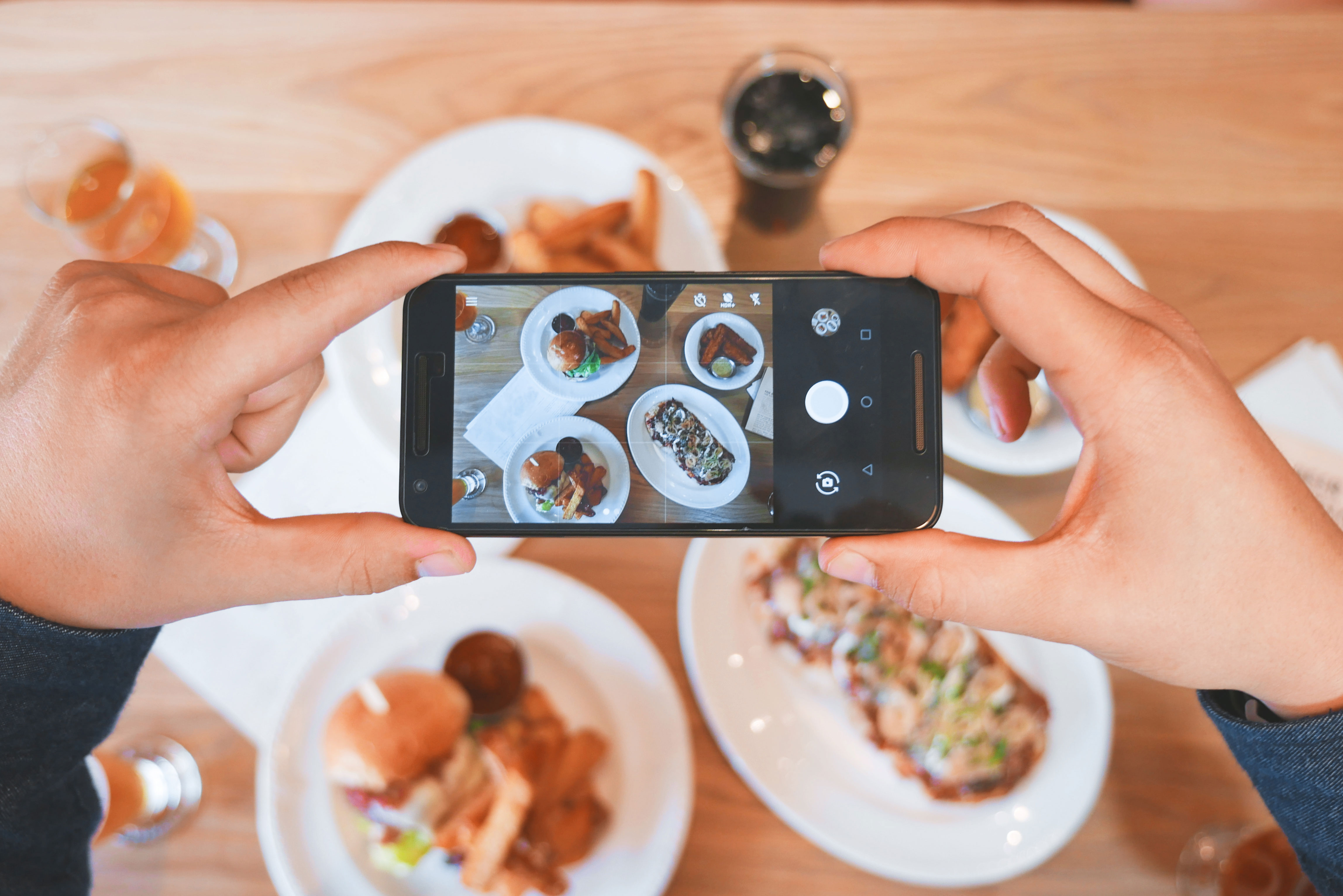
A person taking a photograph of their meal

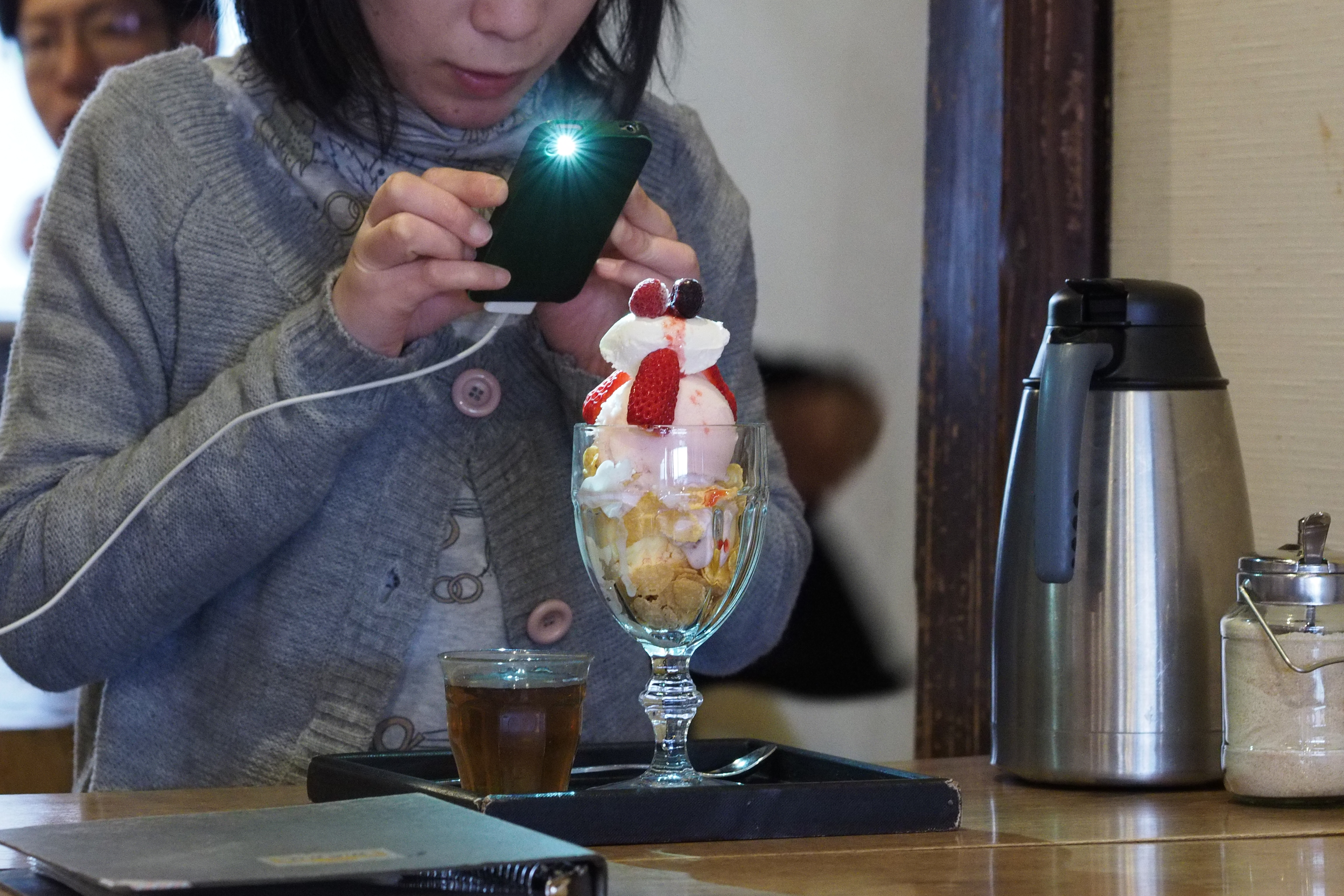
A restaurant patron taking a photo of their dessert

The rise of social media in the 21st century has led to restaurant patrons and home cooks taking digital smartphone photographs of meals before eating them. Such food photographs are generally for personal use, such as keeping photographic food diaries, rather than for commercial purposes.

The phenomenon has been referred to as "camera eats first" in Hong Kong, the expression referring to the photographer metaphorically "feeding" their camera before feeding themselves.

== Background ==
Food photographer Dave Hagerman has said that, prior to the advent of digital photography, a person's enthusiasm for food might be confined to books, magazines and dinner parties. "Pre-digital, I don’t remember anyone (apart from myself) taking pictures of food on film for personal use." The arrival of photographic social media such as Instagram made it easier for people to share their personal food interests with others.

Keeping a photogenic food diary is being treated as a form of self-representation, showing who they are from what they eat in accordance to the quote of "Tell me what you eat, and I will tell you what you are," by the French philosopher and gourmand Jean Anthelme Brillat-Savarin.

== Prevalence ==
The social food photography phenomenon is becoming more common all over the world with the emergence of smartphones and social media. After taking photos of their food, people often share these photos on social media such as Instagram, Facebook, Twitter and Pinterest. According to Webstagram, there are more than 180 million photos with the hashtag #food currently on Instagram. Other hashtags such as #foodporn and #foodie are often added to these photos. It is estimated that 90 new photos hash-tagged #foodporn are uploaded to Instagram every minute. The phenomenon is especially more prevalent among the younger generation. According to a survey done by News Limited, "54 per cent of 18–24 year olds have taken a photo of their food while eating out, while 39 per cent have posted it somewhere online. This compares with only 5 per cent of over-50s who say they share food snaps on forums such as Facebook and Twitter."

== Positive effects ==
=== Increased connection and satisfying psychological needs ===
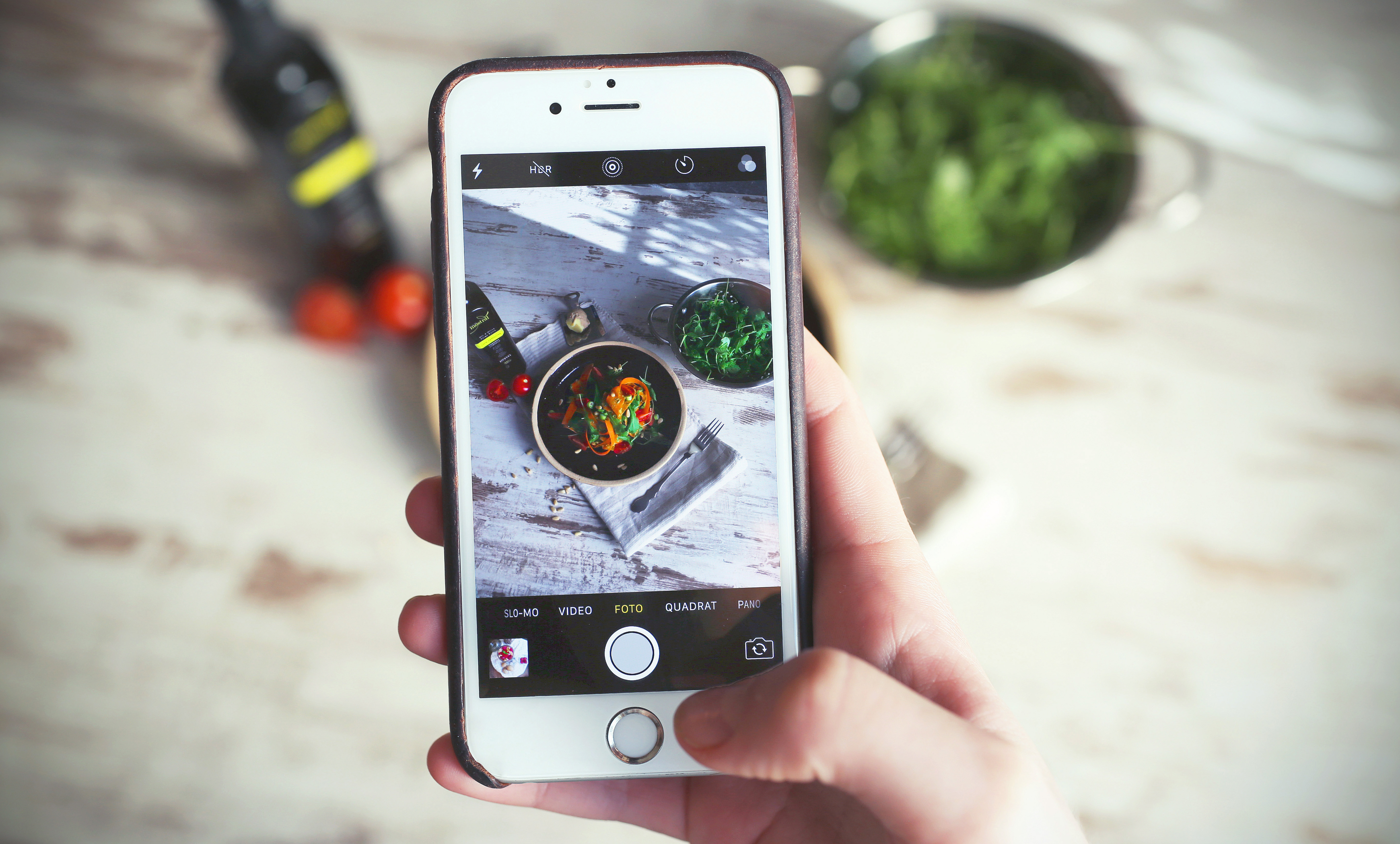
Sharing food photos on social media can turn a private meal into a more communal experience.

Through sharing food photos on social media, users can form connections with other people and strengthen interpersonal bonds. Food is always a community event and a bonding experience which can bridge the gap between people and share joy. Through the sharing, a private dining experience is turned into a communal bonding activity. People can communicate and share their emotions with others, for example, happiness at a party.

In addition, people can satisfy the psychological needs of "belongingness and love" and "esteem" according to the Maslow's hierarchy of needs as they can share their experiences and show off to the world what they are eating.

=== Business opportunities ===
Sharing food photos can facilitate people's obsession with food, but it can also help promote restaurants. Sharing of food photos can be a visual pull that will subconsciously alert people to check out new restaurants. Carmel Winery, a restaurant in Israel, gained $400,000 from free promotion by food photos on social media and successfully boosted its sales by 13%. On the other hand, some chefs in Hong Kong would take "food porn" photos and post them on social media because they thought that the "camera eats first" phenomenon served as a channel for them to collect feedback from customers which is vital information for them to make improvements to their dishes.

=== Making food taste better ===
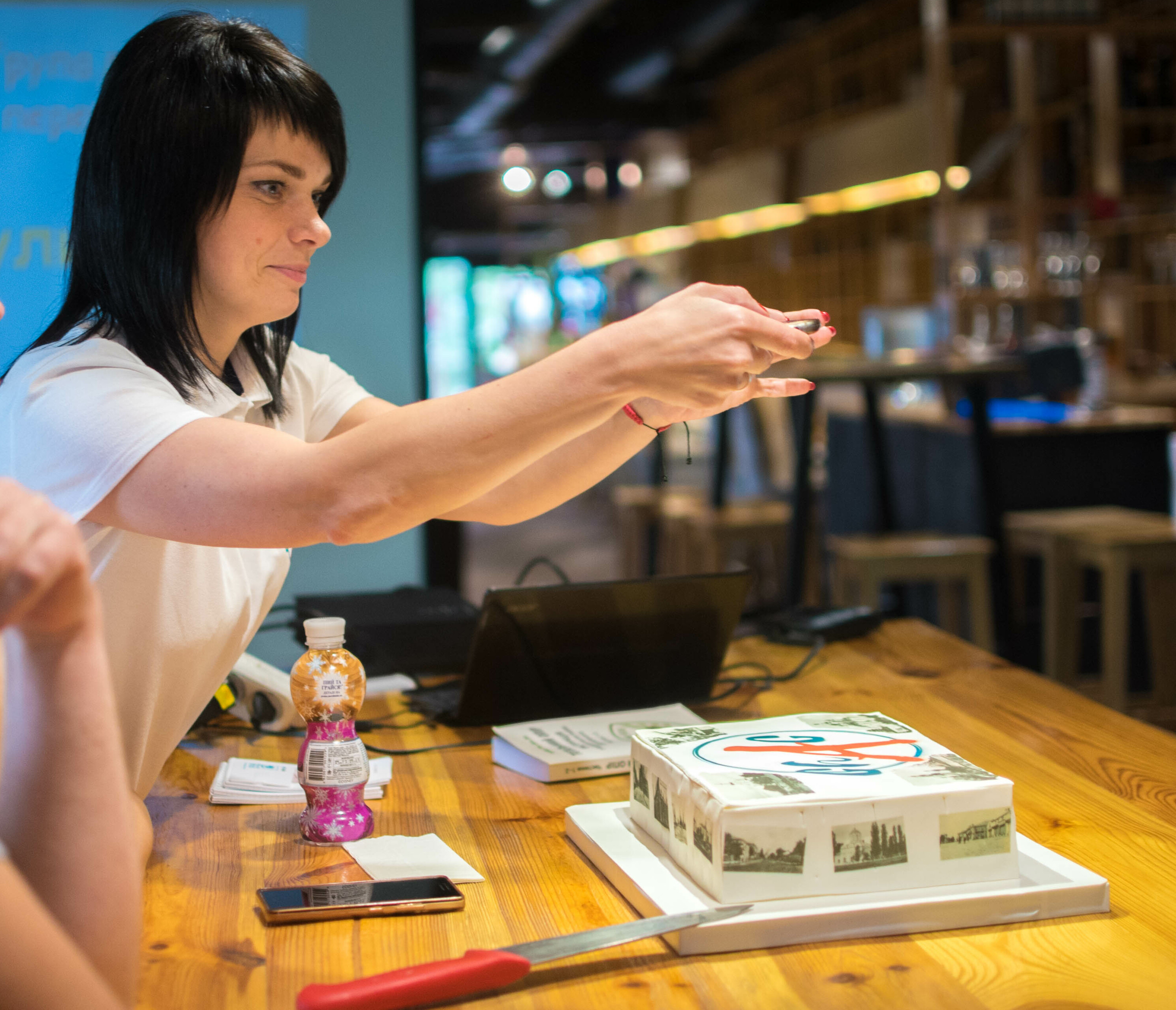
A person photographing a cake before cutting it

According to a study mentioned on Bit of News, taking photos of pleasurable food, such as cakes, before eating it can increase the savoring — "the increased anticipation built up from taking photos of the food made it taste better." If people don't take a photo, they may even feel something is missing from the savoring experience. In a study according to the Journal of Personality and Social Psychology, people who took photographs said that their food had been tastier than the group who had not. Trying to capture the perfect image to share it with others is the reason it tastes better. The study also suggested that the group who had taken photographs of their food expressed how enjoyable the entire experience had been because of it. The photographer rearranges the setup in order to take the best picture possible.

== Negative effects ==
=== Possibly aiding infringement of chefs' intellectual property ===
The "Camera Eats First" behavior was banned in some French restaurants, as diners might help infringe upon chefs' intellectual property. Some French chefs expressed criticism that this behavior would ruin the surprise of future diners, as they might have seen the photos of dishes shared on the internet before coming to the restaurant. Diners posting the photos on social media may give rise to intellectual property disputes about other chefs copying the ideas and presentation of the plates, which are the creative elements contributed by the original chefs.

=== Impoliteness and worsening relationships ===
The "Camera Eats First" behavior may be considered as an impolite table manner. When diners photograph the food, they may place too much emphasis on the appearance of the food and try to capture the food at its best angle by rearranging tables. It may disrupt other people dining and spoil the enjoyment of their meal. They may also leave their partners in a state of hunger and impatience.

On the other hand, while people are busy photographing their food and sharing it online, they will have less time to communicate with their friends and family. One of the functions of eating—enabling families and friends to gather together and enhance intimacy—is lost. The 'Camera Eats First" behavior may result in worsening relationships and weakening connection with others in contrast with the positive effect mentioned.
