= Kettering-Oakwood Times =

Defunct weekly newspaper

- Type: Weekly newspaper
- Owner(s): Civitas Media
- Founded: 1956
- Ceased publication: August 9, 2013

The Kettering-Oakwood Times was a weekly suburban newspaper last owned by Civitas Media of Davidson, North Carolina.

== Overview ==
The newspaper, first published in 1956, was one of three Civitas-owned Dayton, Ohio–area community papers that ceased publication on August 9, 2013. The paper was formerly owned by Brown Publishing Company and Amos Press.

The paper, which was known locally as the "K-O Times", primarily served Kettering and Oakwood, Ohio, suburbs south of Dayton.

Its most famous columnist was local housewife and humorist Erma Bombeck, whose column first appeared in its pages. Ted Rall's editorial cartoons were also first published in the "K-O Times".

In 1971, the paper's women's section, edited by Anita Richwine, won the Penney-Missouri Award for General Excellence.

The paper ceased on August 9, 2013.
