= Food journalism =

Form of journalism that reports on food

Food journalism is a field of journalism that focuses on news and current events related to food, its production, and the cultures of producing and consuming that food. Typically, food journalism includes a scope broader than the work of food critics, who analyze restaurants and their products, and is similar to a sub-genre of "food writing", which documents the experience and history of food.

Food journalism often explores the impact of current events on food, such as how the Impact of the COVID-19 pandemic on the food industry, or larger issues, such as impacts of climate change on food production. Increasingly, these themes overlap with public health journalism, political journalism, and economic journalism. Food journalism can inform the public about how public policy influences America's food system and the importance of immigrant labor in industry. Food journalism also covers topics such as the importance of essential workers during the COVID-19 pandemic, restaurant workers' roles in society and expand on the cultural importance of truck drivers. This expands on themes traditional to food criticism, which has tended to focus on fine dining and other kinds of food writing, like cookbook writing. These themes are similar to the themes covered in agricultural journalism, which focuses on the agriculture industry for agricultural audiences.

The NYT Cooking provides relevant information about the history and cultural relevance of food recipes, allowing for the diffusion of cuisines from around the world, often different from one's own culture. Food journalism requires care and understanding through speaking to experts about the cuisines and conducting careful research about culture and diet. Cooking at-home recipes and sharing recipe advice and construction contribute to food sovereignty by enforcing less dependences on pre-packaged and commercial food.

Food journalism expands further by informing the public about news and current events related to food, by discussing the importance of food sovereignty. Food sovereignty refers to the control people have over the production and distribution of their food. It helps the public understand the food systems around them as well as influencing personal diet choices.

== Food Journalism as a Watchdog ==
Food editors face the challenge of keeping readers engaged by producing content based on what they believe consumers want. Recognizing the relationships within food systems and challenging consumers is an important element of food journalism. Journalism's role as a watchdog continues on, first established in the 19th and 20th centuries. Investigative journalism uncovers how private and public worlds co-exist within the food system.

A reporter from Lighthouse Reports, Tessa Pang, found a challenge of engaging an audience with a story about lobbying. A 2020 investigation found 1.5 million people in the European Union signed petitions lobbying to improve animal welfare. Slaughtering one-day-old chickens, banning cages and selling fur were on the petitions, and all of the policies except the use of cages were dropped by the lobbying of livestock interest groups. Pang linked the investigation to an increase of consumers buying cage-free eggs by emphasizing industries participate in actively preventing people from buying their food more ethically.

The contemporary field of food journalism grew in the mid-20th century, especially as issues like food rationing during and after World War II. In the United States, the Association of Food Journalists provides professional standards and a code of ethics.

== History of Food Journalism ==
Food journalism dates back to the 1880s when Joseph Pulitzer introduced women's pages into his newspaper, the New York World. Other publications were quick to take on these additions with the women's section covering news on fashion, family, furnishings—and food. These were considered the four Fs of ‘soft news’ or ‘women’s news’. The pages were both a chance for advertisers to reach audiences and for women to be employed in journalism. The newspaper food sections were dense with product advertisements, news on recipes, and nutrition studies. In 1948, it was reported that 56% of women got their food news from newspapers and magazines, citing the relevancy of this emerging field. By 1950, the number of newspaper food editors had more than doubled to a total of 561. As a result, the revenue and advertisement potential influenced prominent editors to produce food pages.

Until the 1940s and 1950s, women in journalism were contained from writing on sports, editorials, or what was considered hard news. During World War II, women took on a variety of roles, recognized both on the home front and in the military effort. As a result, the women's pages after World War II diversified and changed the significance of women's news. In the post-World War II era, food coverage often addressed social history and reflected the evolving roles of women in society.

In the 1940s, Jane Nickerson began her job as the first New York Times food editor. Nickerson began covering war-rationing news, food product developments, and recipes. After World War II, her work evolved to document the rapidly developing New York restaurant industry and profiled future food celebrities. Nickerson pioneered the industry of food journalism in the women's pages and was at the forefront of influence in restaurant reviews, interviews, and new products. These food journalists reached consumers and cooks, documented nutritional issues and food safety, and covered the impact of governmental food regulation and the consumerism movement. Jane Nickerson activated the potential for food discourse to engage with important social, political, and cultural issues. Her contributions have grown the scholarship of newspaper food journalism into what it is today.

By the 1950s, most food editors were educated and had a degree in either journalism, home economics, or both. Like other mediums of journalism, food editors followed traditional news values, researching the precision of their articles. Milwaukee Journal food editor Peggy Daum gave the same care to the food section as the front page, stating, “If someone’s age is wrong, that’s one thing. But if the amount of flour in a recipe is wrong, then the whole recipe can be ruined.” The food section has become a serious practice with publishers like the Chicago Tribune even reprinting entire recipes if there were to be a mistake. Food journalism has evolved to be legitimate journalism, rooted in the accomplishments of women at the forefront.

In the early 2000s, technological advances allowed for the emergence of food bloggers on the Internet. Although audiences view food bloggers as information gatekeepers and providers, some food bloggers don't consider themselves as journalists. However, some argue that food bloggers share similar qualities as lifestyle journalists. This discourse is challenged by the idea that food journalists are paid by newsrooms and organizations to report on food and eating, while food bloggers are following their passion for cooking. Like modern food influencers on social media, food bloggers are often more driven by the interactions with their blog, and consider themselves as consumers of media, rather than producers. Many food bloggers are not culinary professionals, and instead are cooking hobbyists.

== Food Journalism on Social Media ==
Contemporary food journalism utilizes social media platforms as an evolved form of journalism. This form of journalism emerged between 2014 and 2018, as the use of digital platforms has increased journalistic practices. Food critics who post and publish their work on social media are considered citizen journalists. Social media influencers are a newer form of food journalism as those who review and critique food with a social media following. Influencers can use food journalism as a way to market themselves online as well, creating their own platform through branding. The role of social media can largely impact restaurants, bringing more awareness and attention through influencers' posts on social media. They play a role in which restaurants and businesses are brought into the spotlight.

Journalism transforming into the hands of influencers is the result of the change in perspective of journalism. Journalism has evolved from traditional standards, as journalistic practices are more diverse. Social media food reviewers are multidimensional, as they serve the public while also gaining their own platform and brand. Social media gives citizen journalists a larger voice to the public, allowing more opportunity for minority voices to be heard.

== Code of Ethics ==
The Association of Food Journalists (AFJ), founded in the 1970s, created the American Food Journalist Code of Ethics, and was made up of five core principles that food journalists.

The AFJ was dissolved in 2024 due to lack of funds from failure to adapt their revenue model to keep up with the rise of digital journalism and the decreased hegemony of print media. However, the Code of Ethics and the AFJ's legacy continue to be respected by food journalists following the dissolution. The five core principles outlined by the AFJ have not been rewritten or replaced and continue to constitute the main guidelines food journalists follow. The five principles are:

1. "We take pride in our work, and respect the work of others"
2. "We do not abuse our positions"
3. "We avoid conflicts of interest"
4. "We recognize and respect diversity"
5. "We are committed to total transparency in our work"

== Major Awards ==
=== The James Beard Foundation Awards ===
The James Beard Foundation Award, organized by the James Beard Foundation, first began in 1991 with the mission to "recognize culinary professionals for excellence and achievement in their fields". In 1992, the journalism and media award was added, which includes awards for excellence in books, broadcast media, and journalism related to food and gastronomy. The James Beard Foundation Award is often referred to as the 'Oscars' of the culinary industry.

Within the food journalism category are several sub-awards including Beverage, Columns and Newsletters, Emerging Voice, Dining and Travel, Feature Reporting, Food Coverage in a General Interest Publication, U.S. Foodways, Health and Wellness, Homecooking, Investigative Reporting, Narrative Photography, Personal Essay, Personal Essay with Recipes, and Profile. Furthermore, there are several categories named after significant figures within the food journalism industry, including the Jonathan Gold Local Voice Award, named after the Los Angeles Food Critic Jonathan Gold, which honours "new writers who are telling stories of their cities and regions". As well as the Craig Claiborne Distinguished Criticism Award, names after Craig Claiborne, an American food critic for the New York Times which recognizes "discerning criticism or commentary that contributes to the larger discourse on food, drink, and related topics". Finally, the MFK Fisher Distinguished Writing Award, named after American food journalist M. F. K. Fisher who wrote The Art of Eating, which awards "a single article of exceptional literary merit on the subject of food and/or drink published in any medium".

== Food journalists ==
- Rumi Ide
- Ruth Reichl
