= Mary N. Frampton =

Mary N. Frampton (September 17, 1930 – December 29, 2006) was one of the first female photographers employed by the Los Angeles Times. She was the organizer of the Save Our Coast environmental organization.

== Biography ==
Mary Nogueras was born in New York City in 1930 and was brought to San Bernardino, California, by her parents, Eugenio Nogueras, the editor and publisher of El Sol de San Bernardino, a weekly Spanish-language newspaper, and Edithe Hethcock, a sculptor. She attended San Bernardino High School and San Bernardino Valley College, where she studied advertising and journalism. She was employed as a photographer in 1950 by the San Bernardino Sun, briefly in the public relations office of the Beverly Hills Hotel, and in 1954 by the Santa Monica Outlook. She was hired by the Los Angeles Times in 1956 and retired from there in 1987.

Frampton "was a key environmental figure" in Malibu, California, "battling developers and working to preserve open spaces and protect marine life." Mark Gold, executive director of Heal the Bay, said she was one of “the original coastal environmental advocates that meant so much during the '70s and '80s.”

She was married to a Times editor, Robert Frampton, who predeceased her. She died in 2006, aged 76.

== Awards ==
In 1966, Frampton won a Penney-Missouri award as Women's Page Photographer of the Year, and in 1970, she won a second Penney-Missouri for feature photography.
