= Lynne Duke =

American journalist and author

Lynne Duke (July 29, 1956 – April 19, 2013) was a journalist and author.

== Biography ==
After graduating from Columbia University in 1985, she began her journalistic career in the Miami Herald. She highlighted important events there, as well as the Washington Post, where she began working in 1987. Her important work enabled her to receive a Pulitzer Prize after his election as reported in 1980. Her work included important information from Pulitzer on cocaine crisis in the 1980s, coverage of the effects of racism and its abolition in South Africa she went there to The Washington Post for the first time in 1990, when Nelson Mandela was released from prison after 27 years and a life report in New York City.

Her 2003 book, Mandela, Mobutu and Me, is a critically acclaimed memoir chronicling her four-year term as chief of The Washington Post's African bureau and was nominated for the National Community of Black Writers' Hurston/Wright Legacy Award in 2004.

After her return to the U.S., Duke served as The Washington Post's New York City bureau chief for a year. She later returned to Washington, D.C., and wrote long-form features for the Style section, eventually becoming editor and retiring from the paper in 2008. She immediately began work on a second book, for which she was awarded a fellowship from The Alicia Patterson Foundation.

Duke was diagnosed with stage IV lung cancer in 2009. The cancer was metastatic. After her death in 2013, the National Association of Black Journalists established the Lynne Duke International Fellowship to honor the memory and legacy of the longtime journalist and member of their community.

== Awards ==
- 1987 Penney-Missouri Award for Excellence in Reporting.
