= Erma Bombeck =

American humorist and writer (1927–1996)

- Erma Bombeck
- Born: Erma Louise Fiste; February 21, 1927; Bellbrook, Ohio, U.S.
- Died: April 22, 1996 (aged 69); San Francisco, California, U.S.
- Education: University of Dayton
- Occupations: Humorist, syndicated columnist, writer
- Spouse: Bill Bombeck (m. 1949)
- Children: 3
- Writing career
- Years active: 1965–1996

Erma Louise Bombeck (née Fiste; February 21, 1927 – April 22, 1996) was an American humorist who achieved great popularity for her newspaper humor column describing suburban home life, syndicated from 1965 to 1996. Fifteen books of her humor have been published; most became bestsellers.

Between 1965 and April 17, 1996 – five days before her death – Bombeck wrote over four thousand newspaper columns, using broad and sometimes eloquent humor, chronicling the ordinary life of a Midwestern suburban housewife. By the 1970s, her columns were read semi-weekly by 30 million readers of the nine hundred newspapers in the United States and Canada. Her work stands as a humorous chronicle of middle-class life in America after World War II, among the generation of parents who produced the Baby Boomers.

== Early life ==
Erma Fiste was born in Bellbrook, Ohio, to a working-class family, and was raised in Dayton. Her parents were Erma (née Haines) and Cassius Edwin Fiste, who was the city crane operator. Young Erma lived with her elder paternal half-sister, Thelma. She began elementary school one year earlier than usual for her age, in 1932, and became an excellent student and an avid reader. She particularly enjoyed the popular humor writers of the time. After Erma's father died in 1936, she moved, with her mother, into her grandmother's home. Her mother remarried in 1938, to Albert Harris (a moving van owner). Erma practiced tap dance and singing, and worked for a local radio station for a children's revue for eight years.

=== Formative years ===
Erma entered Emerson Junior High School in 1940, and began writing a humorous column for its newspaper, The Owl. In 1942, she entered Parker (now Patterson) Vocational High School, where she wrote a serious column, mixing in bits of humor. That same year she began work at the Dayton Herald as a copygirl, sharing her full-time assignment with a girlfriend. In 1944, for her first journalistic work, she interviewed Shirley Temple, who visited Dayton, and the interview became a newspaper feature.

She completed high school in 1944 and sought to earn a college scholarship fund; for a year she worked as a typist and stenographer, for the Dayton Herald and several other companies, and also did minor journalistic assignments (obituaries, etc.) for the Dayton Herald. Using the money she earned, Erma enrolled in Ohio University at Athens, Ohio, in 1946. However, she failed most of her literary assignments and was rejected for the university newspaper. She left after one semester when her funds ran out.

Erma later enrolled in the University of Dayton, a Catholic college. She lived in her family home and worked at Rike's, a department store, where she wrote humorous material for the company newsletter. In addition, she worked two part-time jobs – as a termite control accountant at an advertising agency and as a public-relations person at the local YMCA. While she was in college, her English professor, Bro. Tom Price, commented to Erma about her great prospects as a writer, and she began to write for the university student publication, The Exponent. She graduated in 1949 with a degree in English, and became a lifelong active contact for the university—helping financially and participating personally—and became a lifetime trustee of the institution in 1987. In 1949, she converted to Catholicism, from the United Brethren church, and married Bill Bombeck, a former fellow student of the University of Dayton, who was a veteran of the World War II Korean front. His subsequent profession was that of educator and school supervisor. Bombeck remained active in the church for the rest of her life.

== Housewife column ==
=== Housewife (1954–1964) ===
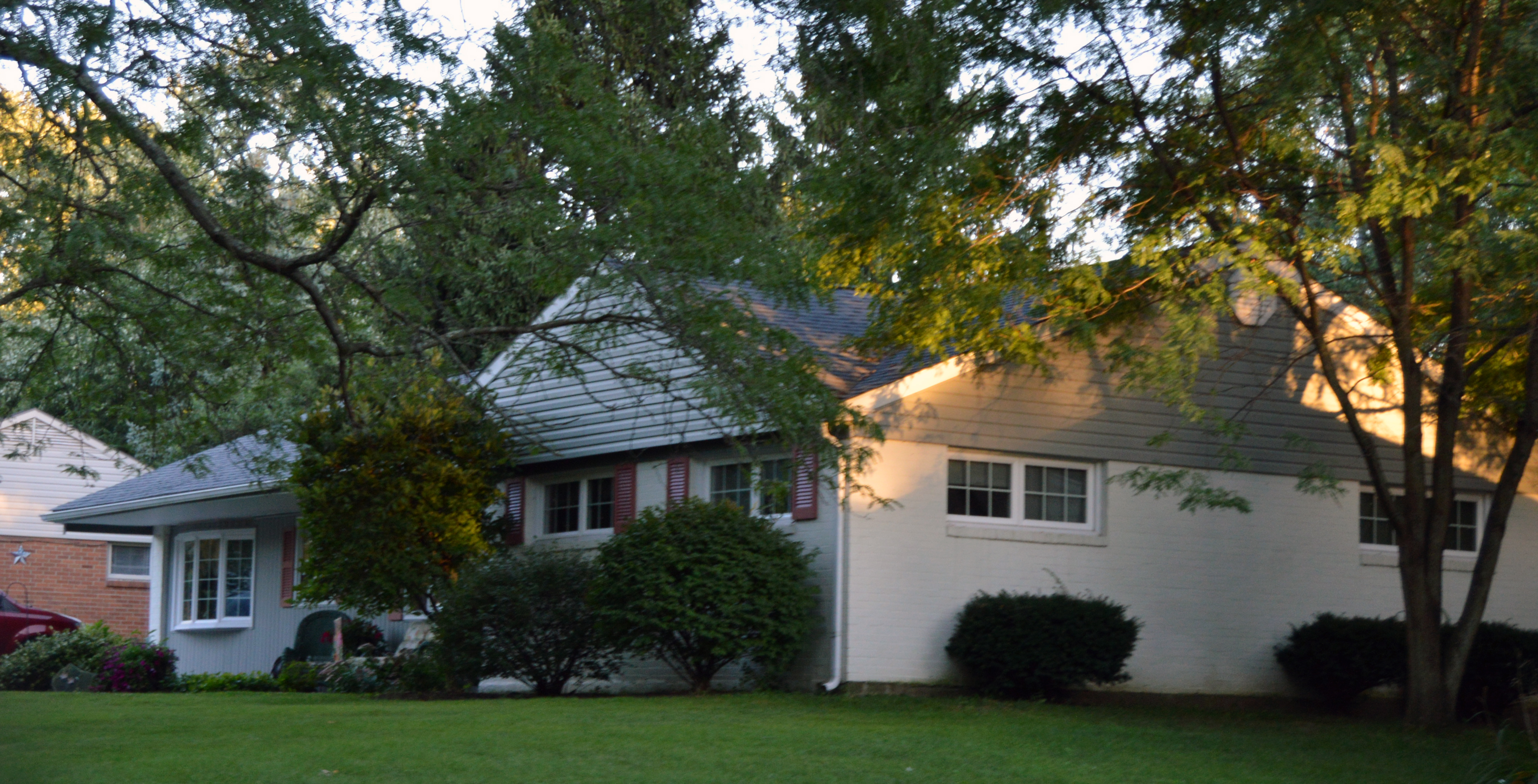
Bombeck's house in Centerville, Ohio, now a historic site

The Bombecks were told by doctors that having a child was improbable, so they adopted a girl, Betsy, in 1953. Bombeck decided to become a full-time housewife and relinquished her career as a journalist. During 1954, Bombeck nevertheless wrote a series of humorous columns in the Dayton Shopping News.

Despite the former difficult diagnoses, Bombeck gave birth to her first son, Andrew, in 1956 and had her second son, Matthew, in 1958. The Bombeck family moved in 1959 to Centerville, Ohio, into a tract housing development, and were neighbors of Phil Donahue. The Bombeck home was added to the National Register of Historic Places in 2015.

=== "At Wit's End" (1965) ===
Bombeck resumed her writing career for the local Kettering-Oakwood Times in 1964, with weekly columns that yielded $3 each. She wrote in her small bedroom. The following year the Dayton Journal Herald requested new humorous columns as well, and Bombeck agreed to write two weekly 450-word columns for $50. After three weeks, the articles went into national syndication through the Newsday Newspaper Syndicate, into 36 major U.S. newspapers, with three weekly columns under the title "At Wit's End".

Bombeck quickly became a popular humorist nationwide. Beginning in 1966, she began doing lectures in the various cities where her columns appeared. In 1967, her newspaper columns were compiled and published by Doubleday, under the title At Wit's End. And after a humorous appearance on Arthur Godfrey's radio show, she became a regular radio guest on the show.

== Diversified production ==
=== Success (1970s) ===
Aaron Priest, a Doubleday representative, became Bombeck's agent. By 1969, five hundred U.S. newspapers featured her "At Wit's End" columns, and she was also writing for Good Housekeeping, Reader's Digest, Family Circle, Redbook, McCall's, and Teen magazines. Bombeck and her family moved to Phoenix, Arizona, to a lavish hacienda on a hilltop in Paradise Valley.

By 1978, nine hundred U.S. newspapers were publishing Bombeck's column.

=== McGraw-Hill (1976) ===
In 1976, McGraw-Hill published Bombeck's The Grass Is Always Greener Over the Septic Tank, which became a best-seller. In 1978, Bombeck arranged both a million-dollar contract for her fifth book, If Life Is a Bowl of Cherries, What Am I Doing in the Pits? and a 700,000-copy advance for her subsequent book, Aunt Erma's Cope Book (1979).

=== Television ===
At the invitation of television producer Bob Shanks, Bombeck participated in ABC's Good Morning America from 1975 until 1986. She began doing brief commentaries, which were recorded in Phoenix, and eventually did both gag segments and serious interviews.

For several years, Bombeck was occupied with multiple writing and TV projects. In 1978, she attempted a television pilot of The Grass Is Always Greener on CBS. In 1981, Bombeck wrote and produced her own show, the also unsuccessful Maggie, for ABC. It aired for just four months (eight episodes) to poor reviews. Bombeck was quickly becoming overworked, returning from Los Angeles to Phoenix only during weekends. Bombeck was offered a second sitcom attempt but she declined.

=== Equal Rights Amendment (1978) ===
In 1978, Bombeck was involved in the Presidential Advisory Committee for Women, particularly for the final implementation of the Equal Rights Amendment, with the ERA America organization's support. Bombeck was strongly criticized for this by conservative figures, and some U.S. stores reacted by removing her books. In 1972, the Equal Rights Amendment was proposed by the United States Congress to the states. Congress specified a seven-year period for ratification. Under Article V of the United States Constitution, ratification by at least three-fourths of the states is necessary, but at the end of the seven-year period, only 35 states had ratified, three fewer than the requirement. Of the 35 states that ratified the proposed amendment, five rescinded their ratifications prior to the deadline. Bombeck expressed dismay over this development..

=== Great popularity (1980s) ===
By 1985, Bombeck's three weekly columns were being published by 900 newspapers in the United States and Canada, and were also being anthologized into a series of best-selling books. She was also making twice-weekly Good Morning America appearances. Bombeck belonged to the American Academy of Humor Columnists, along with other famous personalities. During the 1980s, Bombeck's annual earnings ranged from $500,000 to $1 million a year.

She was the grand marshal for the 97th Tournament of Roses Parade held on January 1, 1986. The parade theme was "A Celebration of Laughter".

== Death ==
Bombeck was diagnosed with polycystic kidney disease (an incurable and untreatable genetic condition) when she was twenty years old. She survived breast cancer and a mastectomy and kept secret the fact that she had kidney disease, enduring daily dialysis. She went public with her condition in 1993. After she spent years on a waiting list for a transplant, one kidney had to be removed, and the remaining one ceased to function. On April 3, 1996, she received a kidney transplant. She died on April 22, 1996, aged sixty-nine, from complications of the operation. Her remains are interred in the Woodland Cemetery, Dayton, Ohio. She was survived by her husband, Bill Bombeck (1927–2018), and their three children.

== Books ==
- At Wit's End, Doubleday, 1967.
- Just Wait Until You Have Children of Your Own, Doubleday, 1971. Illustrations by Bil Keane.
- I Lost Everything in the Post-Natal Depression, Doubleday, 1974.
- The Grass Is Always Greener Over the Septic Tank, McGraw-Hill, 1976.
- If Life Is a Bowl of Cherries, What Am I Doing in the Pits?, McGraw-Hill, 1978.
- Aunt Erma's Cope Book, McGraw-Hill, 1979.
- Motherhood: The Second Oldest Profession, 1983.
- Family—The Ties That Bind ... and Gag!, 1987.
- I Want to Grow Hair, I Want to Grow Up, I Want to Go to Boise: Children Surviving Cancer, 1989. American Cancer Society's Medal of Honor in 1990. (Profits from the publication of this book were donated to a group of health-related organizations.)
- When You Look Like Your Passport Photo, It's Time to Go Home, 1991.
- A Marriage Made in Heaven ... or Too Tired for an Affair, 1993.
- All I Know About Animal Behavior I Learned in Loehmann's Dressing Room, ISBN 0060177888 HarperCollins 1995.
- Forever, Erma: Best-Loved Writing from America's Favorite Humorist, Andrew McMeel Publishing, 1996.

== Legacy ==
The Erma Bombeck Writers' Workshop started in 2000 at the University of Dayton as a one-time event to commemorate the Bombeck family's gift of her papers to the university. The event proved so popular that it has been held every other year since then. The two-day, three-night workshop includes keynote speakers and breakout sessions on the topics of humor writing, human-interest writing, the publishing process, marketing for authors, and blogging, among other areas. Past keynote speakers have included Art Buchwald, Nancy Cartwright, Dave Barry, Garrison Keillor, Mike Peters, Bil Keane and Phil Donahue. More than 350 writers from around the country attend each workshop, which is held on the University of Dayton campus.

In 2004, University of Dayton alumnus Ralph Hamberg and his wife, Cindy, gave a $100,000 gift to start an endowment fund for the workshop, in memory of her cousin, Tom Price, a University of Dayton English professor who told Bombeck, "You can write!" The endowment helps keep the workshop affordable for writers. In addition, the University of Dayton's Alumni Association underwrites the cost of scholarships that allow University of Dayton students to attend for free.

The workshop has spawned a blog, Humorwriters.org; a documentary produced by ThinkTV and distributed nationally through American Public Television; an international writing competition hosted by the Washington-Centerville Public Library; an Ohio historical marker on the University of Dayton's campus; a monthly e-newsletter; a Facebook page; a Twitter feed; and an active online discussion group.

In 2006, the workshop created the world's longest Mad Lib. In 2010, CBS Sunday Morning With Charles Osgood aired a Mother's Day tribute to Bombeck, using the workshop as a backdrop. In 2013, AAA Journeys magazine traced Dayton's literary heritage and pointed to the University of Dayton's efforts to keep Bombeck's legacy alive through a workshop in her name. In 2014, Parade magazine featured a series of pieces about the workshop and Bombeck's enduring appeal.

A Chinese language translation of one of her works about her stepfather Albert Harris, "Father's Love" (父亲的爱), is included as one of the sixty oral reading passages in China's Putonghua Proficiency Test.

== Awards and honors ==
Grammy Awards

Year	Nominated work	Category	Result
1990	Motherhood: The Second Oldest Profession	Best Comedy Recording	Nominated
1990	I Want to Grow Hair, I Want to Grow Up, I Want to Go to Boise	Best Spoken Word or Non-Musical Recording	Nominated
1992	When You Look Like Your Passport Photo, It’s Time to Go Home	Best Comedy Album	Nominated
1994	A Marriage Made in Heaven, or: Too Tired for an Affair	Best Spoken Comedy Album	Nominated

Honorary Awards

- 1978: Golden Plate Award of the American Academy of Achievement
- 1978: Honorary Doctor of Letters, Rosary College
- 1980: Ohio Women's Hall of Fame
- 1990: American Cancer Society Medal of Honor
- 2018: Arizona Women's Hall of Fame
