= Jane Brody =

American science and nutrition journalist

Jane Ellen Brody (born May 19, 1941) is an American journalist/food writer principally covering science and nutrition. She wrote for The New York Times as its weekly "Personal Health" columnist from 1976 to 2022. Her column was syndicated nationwide, and she wrote several books on health. She was called the "High Priestess of Health" by Time magazine in 2008.

== Biography ==
Brody was born on May 19, 1941, in Brooklyn, New York. She attended the New York State College of Agriculture at Cornell University (now the Cornell University College of Agriculture and Life Sciences), where she majored in biochemistry as part of a plan to become a research scientist, graduating with a Bachelor of Science degree in 1962. She found that she could not achieve her goals of "looking for ways to help people lead better lives" as a biochemist and developed an interest in journalism after writing for her high school newspaper during her senior year. She became interested in using her knowledge of science to convey information to the public and enrolled at the School of Journalism of the University of Wisconsin–Madison, graduating in 1963 with a master's degree in science writing.

After graduating, she spent two years as a general assignment reporter at the Minneapolis Tribune. Unaccustomed to what she called "Midwestern reticence", she responded to the isolation and loneliness by eating, increasing her weight from 105 to as much as 140 pounds. She had an epiphany one night and decided that "if I was going to be fat, at least I was going to be healthy". She started changing her eating habits, eating regular meals and taking along healthy snacks. She lost the weight and never regained it.

She returned to New York City in 1965 and was hired by The New York Times as its specialist in covering medicine and biology. In 1973 she wrote an article titled, "Doctors Report Transsexual Cure". She was asked by the Times to write the Personal Health column, which she began in 1976 despite her initial reluctance. Her column has been syndicated by more than 100 papers across the United States.

She has become devoted to exercise, and in the 1980s her routine included singles tennis five days a week (less in winter), she would head out daily after rising at 5 a.m. and preparing breakfast for her family, for a 3½-mile run or ten-mile bike ride, followed by a half-mile swim in the evening.

Brody's approach to eating focuses on moderation, emphasizing potatoes, rice, pasta, dried peas and beans, bread (without butter), bulgur and kasha, accompanied with moderate amounts of low-fat dairy products, fish and shellfish, lean meats and poultry. Before helping her type the manuscript for Jane Brody's Nutrition Book, her late husband Richard Engquist, a confirmed meat-and-potatoes eater, switched his focus from meat to potatoes and ended the year 26 pounds lighter.

Books Brody has written include Jane Brody's Nutrition Book and Jane Brody's Good Food Book, both of which were bestsellers. Jane Brody's Guide to the Great Beyond: A Practical Primer for Preparing for the End of Life was released in early 2009.

She supports the consumption of genetically modified crops, stating that health concerns about them are fueled by fears, not facts.

In February 2022, she wrote that "the time has come for me to say farewell" to her weekly column.

== Awards ==
Brody won a Penney-Missouri Award for Consumer Writing for her column in 1977.
