= Carol Sutton (journalist) =

American journalist (1933–1985)

Carol Sutton (June 29, 1933 – February 19, 1985) was an American journalist. She got her journalism degree from the University of Missouri. In 1974 she became the first female managing editor of a major U.S. daily newspaper, The Courier-Journal in Louisville, Kentucky. She was cited as the example of female achievement in journalism when Time named American Women as the 1975 People of the Year. During her tenure at the paper, it was awarded the 1971 Penney-Missouri Award for General Excellence and in 1976 the Pulitzer Prize for Feature Photography for its coverage of school desegregation in Louisville. She is also credited with significantly raising the number of minority reporters on staff.

Sutton knew of her Kentucky Journalism Hall of Fame award at the University of Kentucky before her death in 1985. The family holds a Carol Sutton Memorial Scholarship Award in her honor every year, which has grown from one recipient to eight or twelve. She was the first white woman to be inducted into the National Association of Black Journalists Hall of Fame.
