= Association of Food Journalists =

Professional association of journalists

The Association of Food Journalists (AFJ) was a US-based professional organization that operated from the early 1970s through 2020 in the field of food journalism. It was created to promote high standards for journalists reporting and writing on food, the food industry, restaurants, cookbooks and related fields.

The organization mostly represented journalist working at newspapers in the United States. The organization closed in 2020, due to lack of funding with a business model heavily reliant on the funding of print journalism.

== Background ==
The AFJ was founded by Milwaukee Journal food editor Peggy Daum in response to blistering statements by U.S. Senator Frank Moss who, in an address at a food writers' conference in 1971, harshly accused food journalists, mainly women, of being strongly influenced by PR agencies and lobbyists for the food industry -- as well as their publications' advertising departments -- by accepting gifts, free travel and lodging, and other favors. Kimberly Wilmot Voss, a scholar of women's pages, where at the time most newspaper food writing appeared, points out that at the time, women were excluded from most major US professional journalism organizations.

Known for his consumer advocacy positions, Moss asked them, "Ladies, are you the pawns of your advertising managers -- or are you journalists?" The conference at which Moss spoke was the Newspaper Food Editors' Conference, which since 1943 had been hosted by The Newspaper Advertising Sales Associates with funding from major commercial food producers and lobbying organizations such as the American Meat Institute. Historically the weeklong conferences included product promotion.

Shortly after the conference, the Columbia Journalism Review published what Voss called a "scathing critique" of newspaper food sections, which further motivated women food journalists. At the time, many US newspapers still included advertising in their food sections.

== Founding ==
A group of women gathered in Daum's conference hotel room the evening after Moss's speech and started planning a professional association for food writers. By 1974, it was up and running with 97 members. Daum became its first president, with Marian Burros of the Washington Star, later of The New York Times, as vice president.

== Work ==
The association gave awards for the best writing in various media categories and held conferences for its members. Notable recipients of AFJ awards include Jackie Summers, David Leite, Ted Genoways, Russ Parsons and Mikki Kendall.

Central to the AFJ's purpose was its code of ethics intended to "protect its members’ integrity and preserve their credibility." The code laid out guidelines for its members to follow to insure the journalistic standards of objectivity in their reporting and writing, free from outside influence. The AFJ guidelines for restaurant reviewers included waiting at least a month before visiting a newly opened restaurant and to experience the restaurant meals "as anonymous as possible" -- considered standard practices today.

== Dissolution ==
The association was dissolved in 2020 due to lack of funds; the organization's business model depended on print journalism organizations providing indirect financial support via paying their staffers' membership dues, their expenses for attending conferences, and their entry fees for awards.
