= John Mecklin (journalist) =

John Mecklin is a journalist, novelist and editor, who specializes in narrative journalism. He was the editor-in-chief of Miller-McCune, a national public policy magazine. Mecklin is currently the editor of the Bulletin of the Atomic Scientists.

== Career ==
After growing up in the Midwest, Mecklin enrolled at Indiana University Bloomington, where he graduated with a Bachelor of Arts in Psychology. From January 1984 to June 1992, he worked as an investigative reporter for the Houston Post. He then matriculated at Harvard University's Kennedy School of Government, graduating in 1993 with a master's degree in public administration. Subsequently, he assumed a variety of leadership positions in public interest magazine journalism.

From August 1993 to February 1997, Mecklin was editor at the Phoenix New Times. He then worked as editor at SF Weekly from February 1997 to October 2005.

Mecklin became consulting executive editor for the launch of Key West Magazine from December 2005 to March 2006. Afterwards, he worked as Editor-in-Chief for the High Country News until November 2007. He moved onto Miller-McCune as Editor-in-Chief from November 2007 until March 2011.

Mecklin has acted as Editor-in-Chief for the Bulletin of the Atomic Scientists since 2014.

== Awards ==
Mecklin has received numerous honors, among others an Investigative Reporters and Editors award, a John Bartlow Martin Award for Public Interest Magazine Journalism, and an Association of Alternative Newsweeklies award for Investigative Reporting. Under his guidance, journalists of the publications he managed won:

- several George Polk Awards;
- the Sidney Hillman Award for reporting on social justice issues;
- several Association of Alternative Newsweeklies Awards.
- an Environmental Journalists Outstanding Explanatory Reporting Award;
- the Investigative Reporters and Editors Award;
- the John Bartlow Martin Award for Public Interest Magazine Journalism, and
- Missouri Lifestyle Journalism Award.

== High Stakes Texas Bingo ==
During his tenure at SF Weekly, Mecklin began working on his roman à clef High Stakes Texas Bingo. In it, Mecklin satirizes Houston politics, as he experienced it during his time at the Houston Post. The novel, which involves semi-fictitious corrupt county judges, shipping magnates, and even vice president George H.W. Bush, focuses on the machinations of Jackie Belfast (real name: Terry O'Rourke), a Democrat and attorney who, after a stint in President Jimmy Carter's White House and a subsequent period in California, returned to Houston to face off with his rival, Bingo Satwell (real name: Harris County Commissioner "Boss" Bob Eckels).

Excerpts from the novel, which has attracted a sizable underground following, are available online.

== Personal life ==
John Mecklin has two children, Dunbar and Hali.
