= Missouri Lifestyle Journalism Awards =

Award for achievement in journalism

The Missouri Lifestyle Journalism Awards were first awarded in 1960 as the Penney-Missouri Awards to recognize women's pages that covered topics other than society, club, and fashion news, and that also covered such topics as lifestyle and consumer affairs. The Penney-Missouri Awards were often described as the "Pulitzer Prize of feature writing". They were the only nationwide recognition specifically for women's page journalists, at a time when few women had other opportunities to write or edit for newspapers. The annual awards appear to have been last given in 2008.

== History ==
The Penney-Missouri awards were conceived by James Cash Penney, founder of the J. C. Penney retail chain, who hoped improving women's page sections would turn them into more effective advertising channels for his stores. Penney established the award at the University of Missouri because he believed the school had the necessary prestige.

Kimberly Wilmot Voss's research suggests that as early as 1960, when the awards were established, women's page sections were reporting on a broader range of issues than expected, often creating the kind of coverage the awards were intended to encourage: "more than just society notices and photographs of brides".

In 1974, as most newspapers were changing their women's sections into features sections, contest rules changed to allow entries from journalists who did not work full-time in a women's page section.

In 1994, J. C. Penney stopped funding the awards, and they were renamed as the Missouri Lifestyle Journalism Awards, with the University of Missouri funding as well as judging.

Award winners were announced for 2008 and previous years in the media and Missouri School of Journalism press releases. However, at least some of the trophies and $1,000 cash prizes for the 2008 winners were only distributed after public reporting of what journalism reporter Jim Romenesko described as "the no-prizes flap," and as late as May 2009, nine months after the announcement of winners. There appears to be no evidence of the awards being given after 2008.

== Leadership ==
The directors of the award program were:

- Paul L. Myhre (1960–1971)
- Robert Hosakawa (1971–1976)
- Ruth D'Arcy (1976–1984)
- George Pica (1984–1988); Pica was also a previous winner of the award
- Nancy Beth Jackson (1988–1994)
- Kent Collins (in 2009)

== Impact ==
Rodger Streitmatter, writing in the scholarly journal Journalism History, credits the awards for helping to change women's pages journalism.

== Award winners ==
- Marie Anderson
- The Ann Arbor News
- Pete Axthelm
- Bill Reiter
- Joel Brinkley
- Jane Brody
- Marian Burros
- Benedict Carey
- Vivian Castleberry
- Daily Camera
- Dallas Times Herald
- The Detroit News
- Lynne Duke
- East Bay Express
- David Finkel
- Fort Worth Star-Telegram
- Mary Nogueras Frampton
- The Greenville News
- Paul Hendrickson
- Marj Heyduck
- Sarah Kaufman (critic)
- Kettering-Oakwood Times
- John Mecklin (journalist)
- The Mercury News
- Milwaukee Journal Sentinel
- The Montana Standard
- The New York Times
- Russ Parsons
- Marjorie Paxson
- John Pekkanen
- The Phoenix (newspaper)
- The Plain Dealer
- Portland Press Herald
- Quad-City Times
- Susan Quinn
- Raul Ramirez (journalist)
- Phyllis Richman
- Peter Rinearson
- The Roanoke Times
- Joseph Rosendo
- San Jose Mercury News West Magazine
- Gail Sheehy
- Mimi Sheraton
- C. W. Smith (writer)
- Gloria Steinem
- Carol Sutton (journalist)
- The Washington Post
- Gene Weingarten
- WomenSports
