= Food photography =

Photographs of food

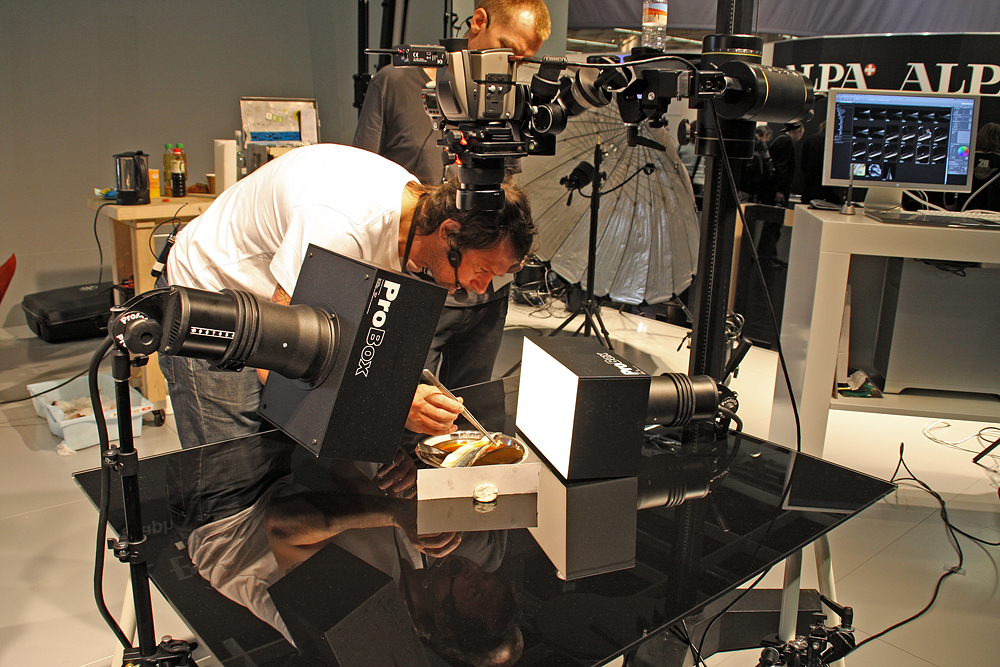
Food photographers at work

Food photography is a still life photography genre used to create appealing still life photographs of food. As a specialization of commercial photography, its output is used in advertisements, magazines, packaging, menus or cookbooks. Professional food photography is a collaborative effort, usually involving an art director, a photographer, a food stylist, a prop stylist and their assistants. With the advent of social media, amateur food photography has gained popularity among restaurant diners.

In advertising, food photography is often – and sometimes controversially – used to exaggerate the attractiveness or size of the advertised food, notably fast food.

== History ==
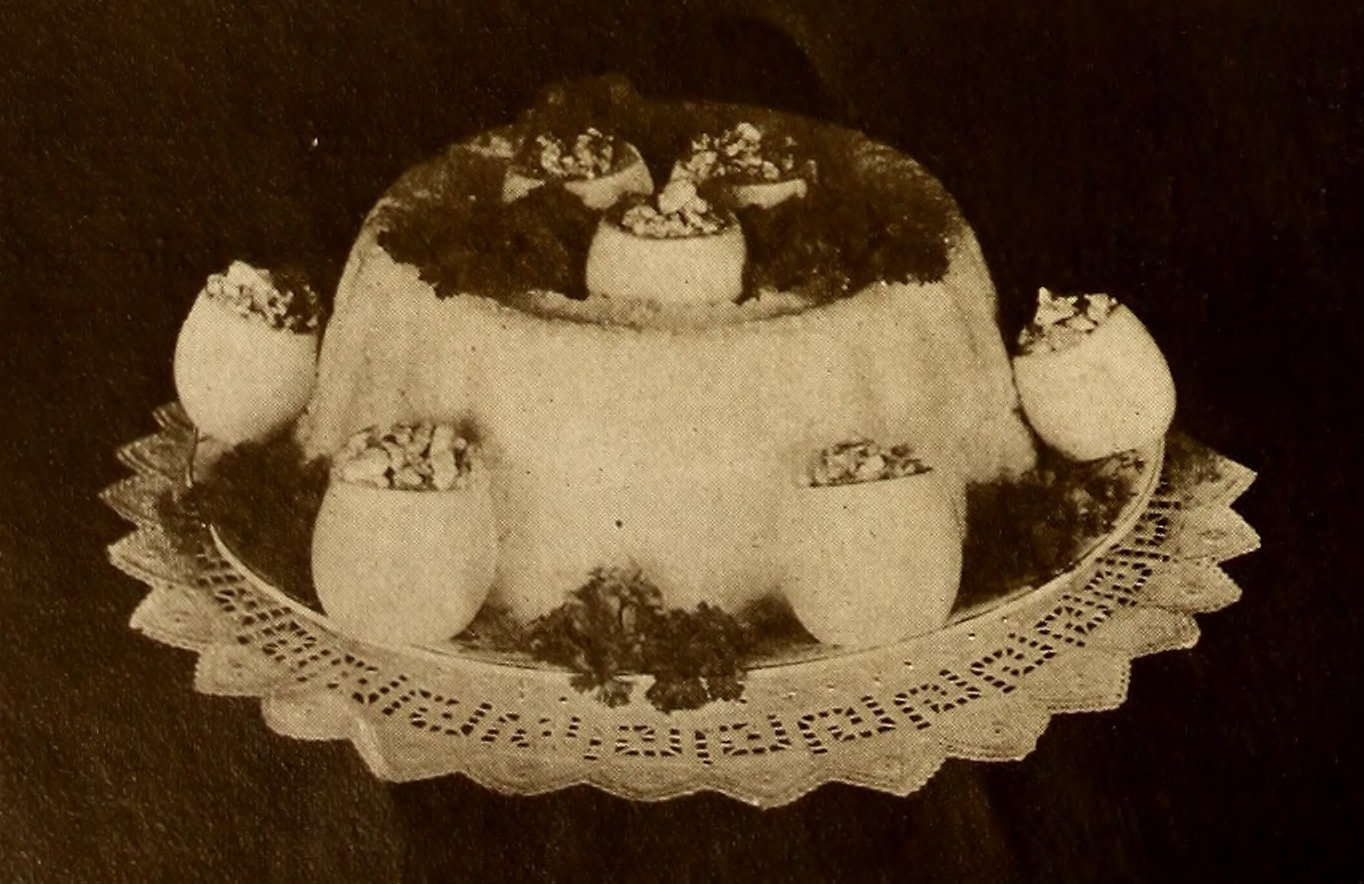
Photographs of food have long been used to illustrate recipes, such as this photo of creatively styled hard-boiled eggs in a 1911 issue of American Homes and Gardens magazine

The first known photograph that showed food as a subject was a 1845 daguerreotype by William Henry Fox Talbot showing peaches and a pineapple.

For a long time, food photographs tended to be shot and composed in a manner similar to the way people were used to encountering their food: laid out on a table setting and shot from an overhead perspective, i.e., from the point of view of the eater. Stylists accordingly arranged the food to appear good from above, with the items arranged flat on the plate and clearly separated from each other.

Later, romantic lighting, shallower angles and more props came en vogue, with extreme cases leading to the term "food porn". Most recently, the prevailing trend in Western commercial food photography is to present the food as simple, clean and naturally as possible and with little props, often using effects such as selective focus, tilted plates, and extreme close-ups. This complements trends in professional cooking to make the food more visually interesting. For instance, the height of dishes tends to increase and their elements are often layered, which lends itself well to narrow-angled shots.

== As a professional practice ==
=== Food stylist ===
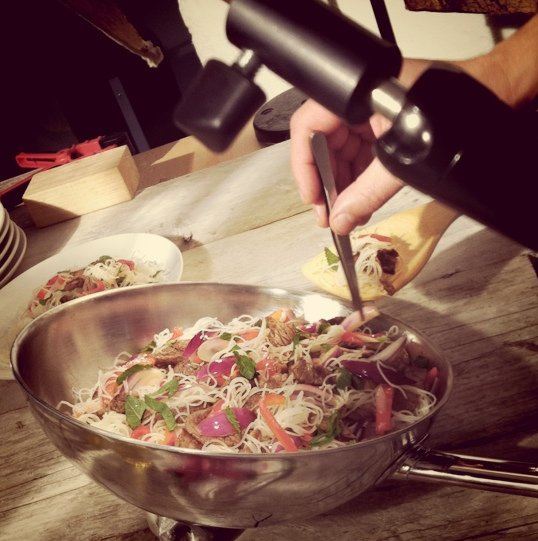
A dish being styled for photography

The role of the food stylist is to make the food look attractive in the finished photograph. The time and effort a stylist takes to carefully and artfully arrange the food is due to differences between the way the stylist presents it and the way a home cook or chef may. Visual know-how is also a requirement, as is the knowledge of how to translate the perception of taste, aroma and appeal that one gets from an actual dish to a two-dimensional photograph.

Food stylists have culinary training; some are professional chefs or have a background in home economics. In addition to knowledge of nutrition and cooking techniques, food stylists must also be resourceful shoppers. As creative professionals they envision the finished photograph and style the food accordingly.

=== Setup ===
The process of food photography begins with the purchase of the food and ingredients. Only the most visually perfect foodstuffs are acceptable and multiple backup or test items are usually needed. As a result, purchase of the food and ingredients is a very time-consuming process. The best-looking of the purchased items is selected and marked as the "hero", i.e., the item that will be featured in the photograph. During the setup and for test shoots, it is represented by a cardboard or lower-quality food item stand-in.

The actual photography can take place in a studio under controlled lighting conditions, or under natural light. The light, background and setting is carefully prepared so as to present the food in as attractive a way as possible without distracting from it. The color and texture of the background is selected so as to effectively complement that of the food and to assist with its lighting.

Styled food is usually marked as inedible and discarded after the shoot, because it may have been handled or treated in ways that make it unsafe for consumption.

Examples of food photography

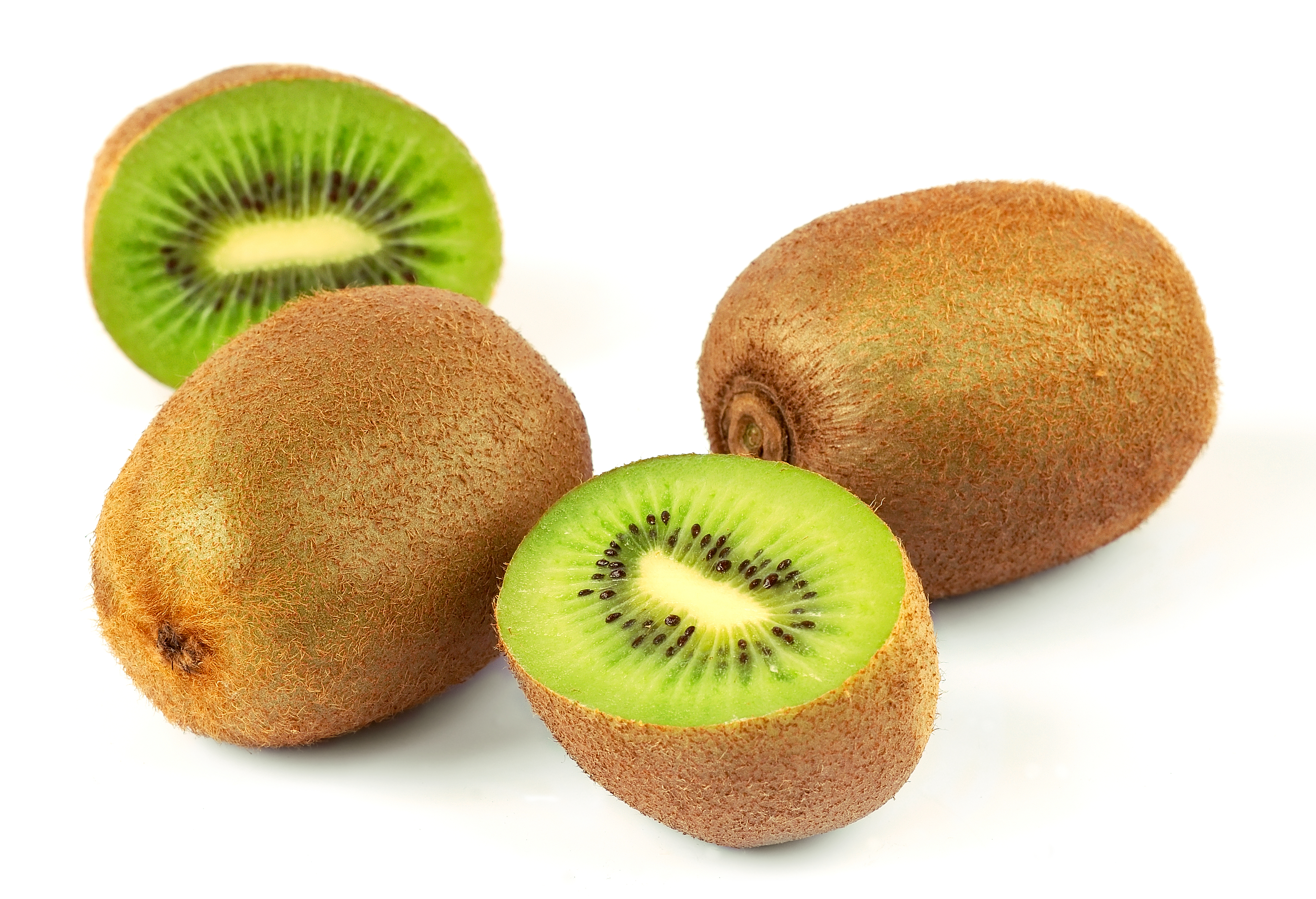
A still life photograph of Kiwifruit against a white background

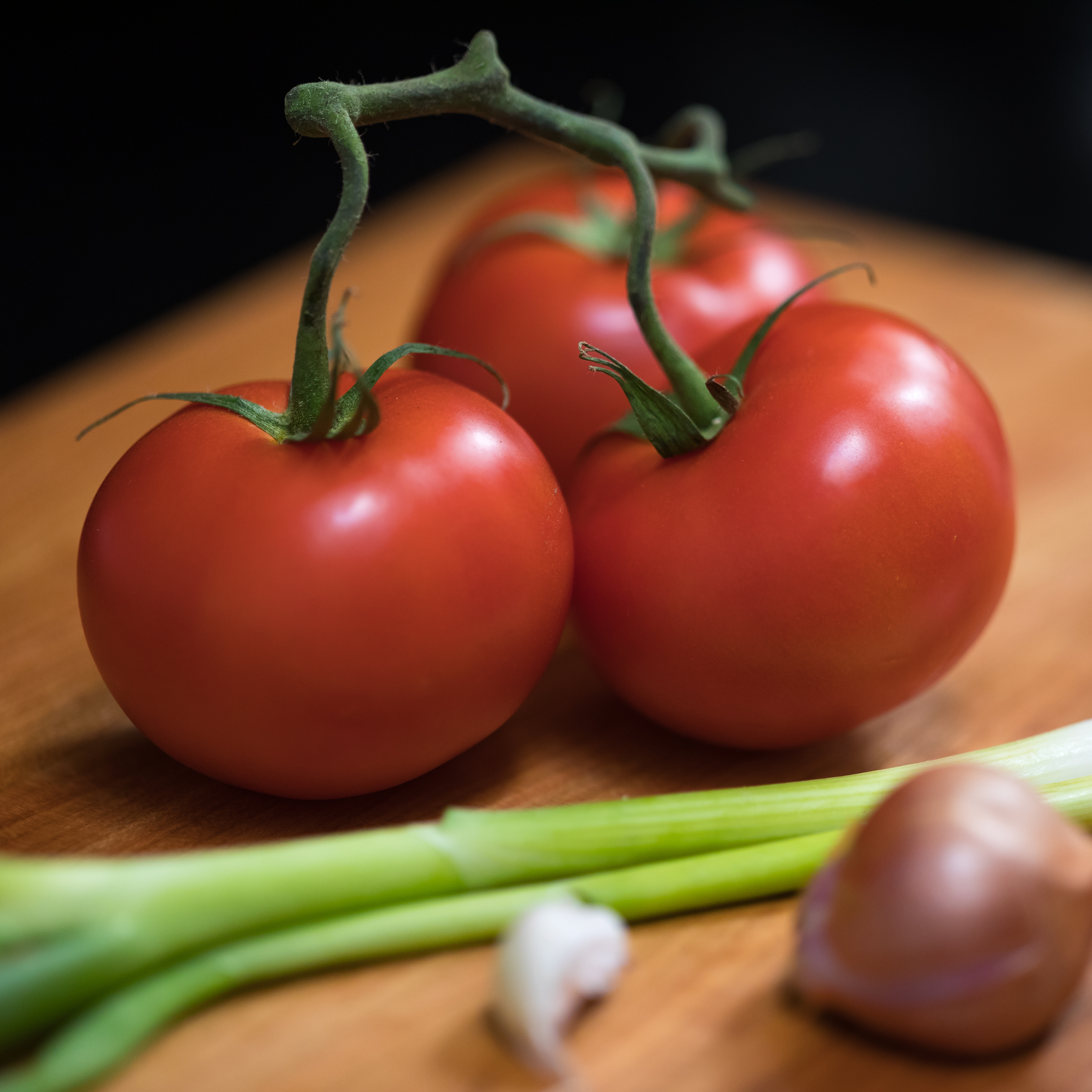
A close-up of tomatoes with selective focus and a shallow angle

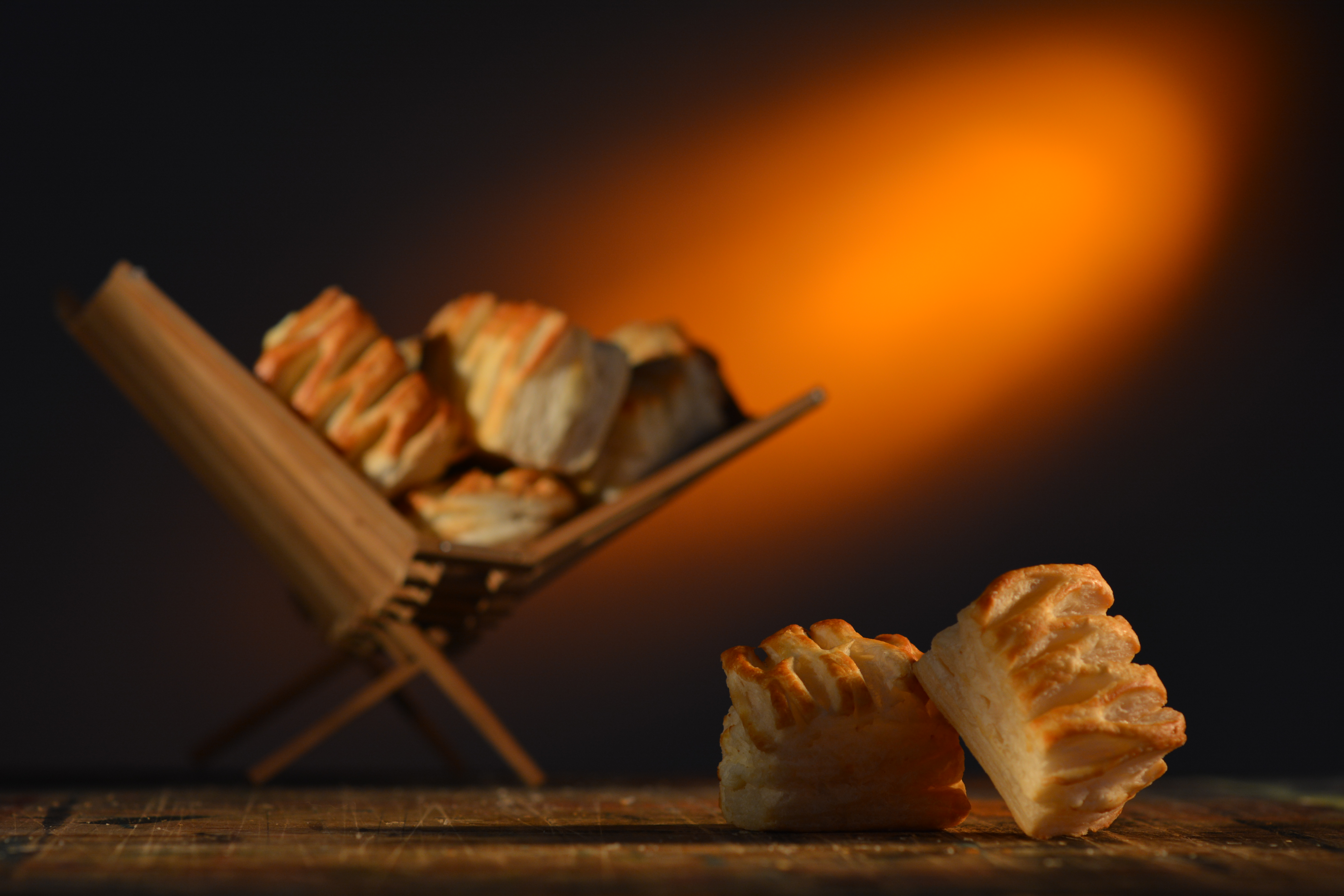
A shallow depth of field creates a defocused effect to highlight a food product

A video montage for use in a pizza commercial

==== Cold beverages ====
To create the effect of a thin layer of condensation forming on the outside of glasses containing cold liquid, dulling spray may be applied, with paper or masking tape protecting the non-"frosted" areas. More pronounced condensation and dew drops are imitated by spraying the glass with corn syrup or glycerin.

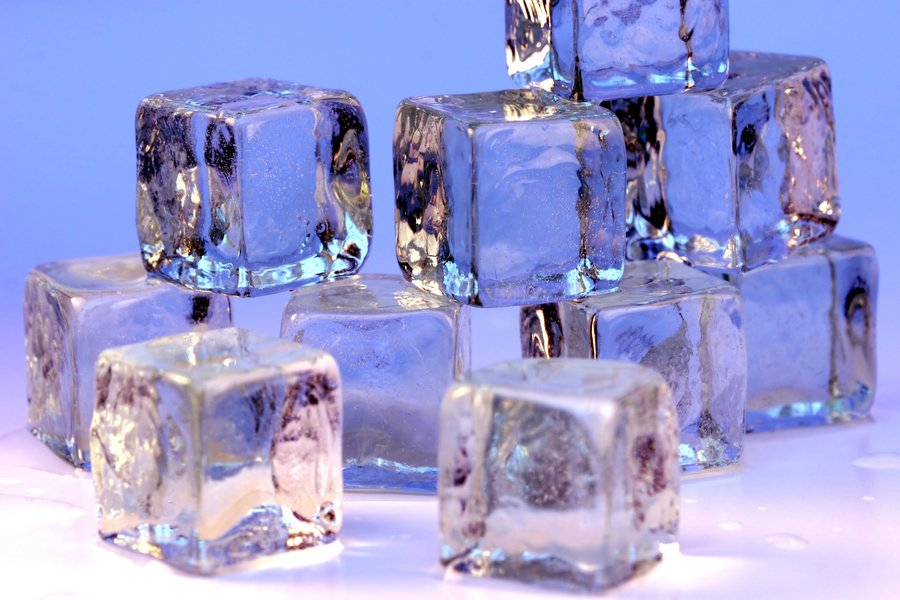
Artificial ice cubes are used in place of real ones in situations where they would melt

Ice cubes used in shoots are made of acrylic, so they do not move or melt during the shoot, which may take place under hot studio lighting. Prior to the widespread availability of acrylic cubes starting in the 1970s and 1980s, glass ice cubes served the same purpose. Fresh-looking bubbles on the surface of drinks are created by applying a mixture of the drink and detergent to the surface with an eyedropper. White glue may be used in lieu of milk, and a mixture of brewed coffee and water instead of tea.

==== Salads ====
Salads in food photography are composed with a view to creating appealing textures, shapes and colors. To improve support and aid in composition, salad in a bowl is built around a smaller bowl placed inverted in the larger bowl. Salad greens are kept fresh and crisp by misting them with cold water prior to composition. Salad dressing is not normally used, as it makes the salad slippery and difficult to style, but the appearance of dressing may be created by sprinkling herbs and spices over the wet salad, or mixing them in oil and applying it with a brush.

Fruit salads are particularly challenging to shoot because of the short time the fruit pieces, which are cut immediately prior to final photography, retain their appearance. As only the outer layer of the salad is of interest, the concealed interior of the salad bowl may be filled by mashed potatoes or another mixture. Thick or heavy dressings do not photograph well; they are usually thinned and applied by brush.

==== Hamburgers and sandwiches ====
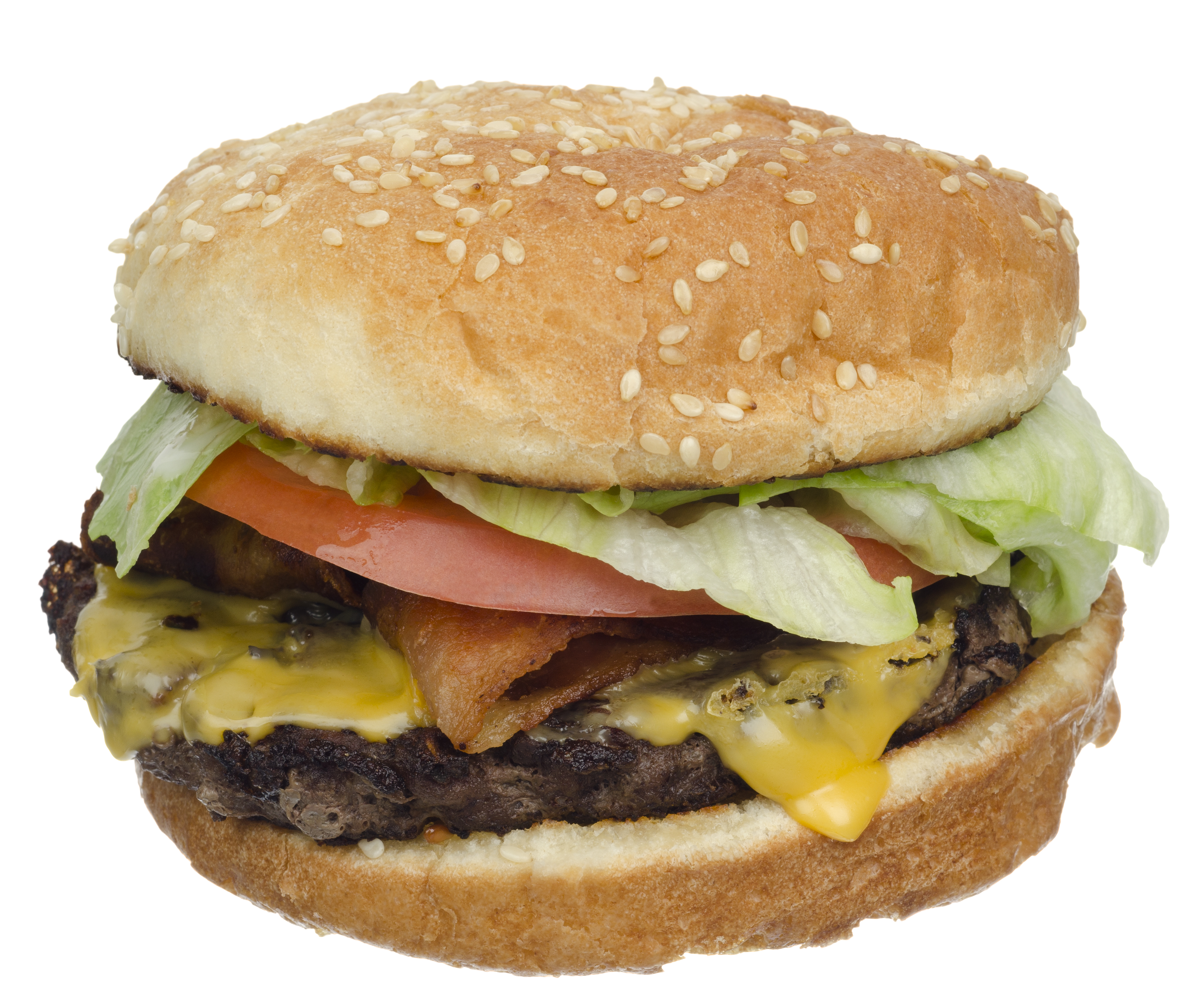
Burger served at a restaurant

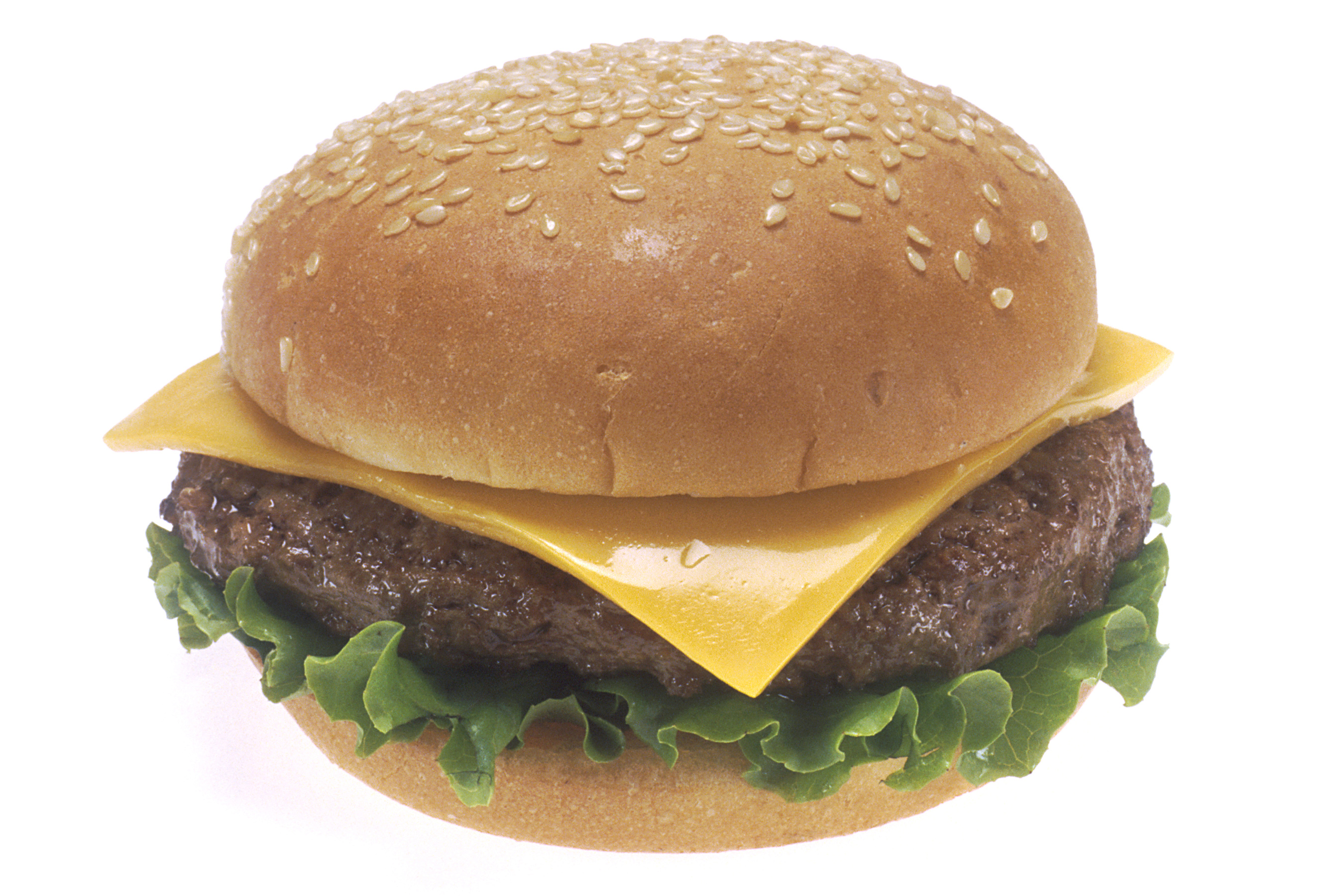
Burger styled for photography

The crushed appearance of the buns and uneven toppings in the hamburger on the left make it less visually appealing. Using undamaged buns, carefully arranged toppings and soft lighting improves the presentation.

Hamburger photography is challenging because the buns dent easily and an assembled burger is quick to lose its visual appeal. When assembling the burger, the ingredients are held in place with toothpicks and the meaty interior of tomato slices is removed to avoid juice discoloring the ingredients. The meat patties are superficially cooked, the edges browned with a torch and the meat made to look more appetizing with a colorant. The edges of melted cheese slices may be brushed with household cleaner to make them look freshly melted longer. Condiments such as mayonnaise are applied to the edges with an applicator bottle. Steam is normally used to suggest the burger is hot.

Sandwiches are assembled using similar techniques. Wet paper towels are used to prevent the bread from drying out. If a half sandwich is to be depicted, the bread and the components are individually sliced with scissors and assembled in place.

Photographic portrayal of fast food has been subject to legal challenges for false advertising. Class-action lawsuit have been brought against fast-food chains McDonald's, Wendy's and Taco Bell on grounds of unfair and deceptive trade practices, alleging that photographs in marketing material depict food products larger than the items served to customers in real life. A similar lawsuit has also been proposed in 2023 against Burger King, alleging that the company's photography depicts their Whopper burger as 35% larger than in real life, with ingredients that "overflow over the bun".

== As a social media phenomenon ==
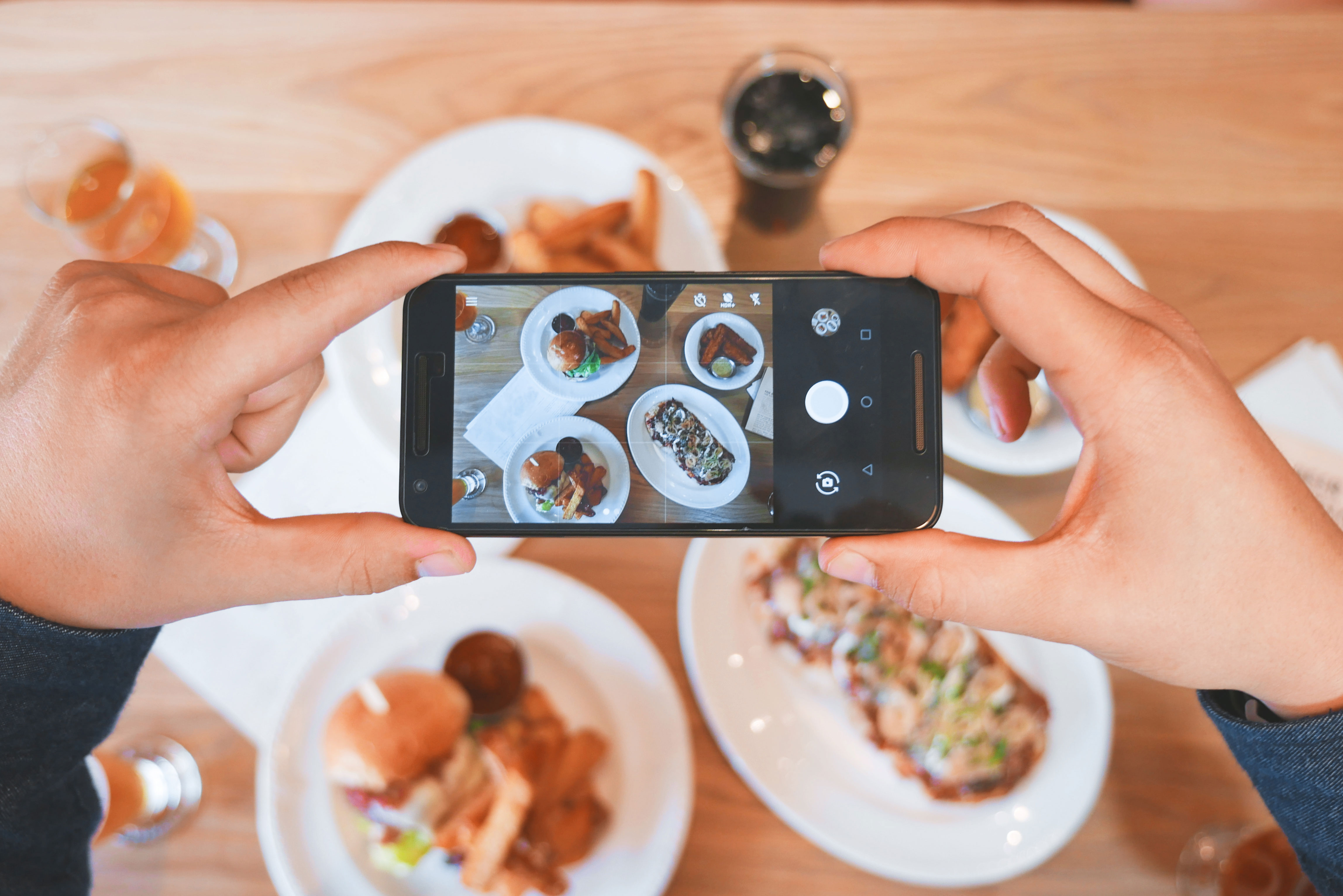
A diner photographing their meal with a mobile phone

Amateur food photography has increased with the rise of social media and the use of selfies. A popular trend has developed for diners to photograph their meals in restaurants using a mobile phone, for the purpose of sharing on sites such as Instagram or for food blogging. The practice is sometimes referred to as "camera eats first".

Influencers may use food photography to advocate healthy eating, fad diets or to promote a restaurant business. Some restaurateurs have objected to the practice and prohibit diners from taking photographs of their meals.

== See also ==
- Food Photographer of the Year
- Food presentation
- List of food and drink monuments
