= Raul Ramirez (journalist) =

- Born: 1946; Havana, Cuba
- Died: November 15, 2013
- Education: University of Florida
- Occupations: Journalist, educator, executive, activist
- Employers: The Miami Herald; The Wall Street Journal; The Washington Post

Raul Ramirez (1946 – November 15, 2013) was an accomplished and widely published print and broadcast journalist and executive, educator, and activist in promoting independent reporting and diversity in the profession.

== Early life ==
Ramirez was born in Havana, Cuba. In April 1962 his parents sent him and his sister, Miriam, to live with relatives in Florida because they were disappointed in what they saw as the failed promise of the Cuban Revolution. He graduated from the University of Florida at Gainesville with a degree in journalism. He once said he studied journalism as a way to improve his English.

== Career ==
After graduation, Ramirez worked as a reporter for The Miami Herald, The Wall Street Journal and The Washington Post. He immersed himself in his stories, for example working as a farm laborer in Michigan to report on conditions in the fields for The Wall Street Journal. After moving to California, he was a reporter and editor at the Oakland Tribune and then at The San Francisco Examiner. While in San Francisco worked as a deputy sheriff reporting on conditions in jails there.

In 1976, while working for the Examiner, Ramirez and freelancer Lowell Bergman, later of 60 Minutes, investigated a San Francisco Chinatown murder case, describing how police and prosecutors pressured witnesses, leading to a conviction. The two reporters and the newspaper were sued by some of the police officers and an assistant district attorney who claimed they were libeled by the story. When the Examiner refused to provide a legal defense for freelancer Bergman, Ramirez also declined the company's lawyers and with friends raised private funds to defend both reporters. The case ultimately was decided in the reporters' favor in 1986 by the California Supreme Court. Later in his life, Ramirez would say the experience made him sensitive to the need to protect reporters, including freelancers, who are not affiliated with powerful media institutions. In 1991 Ramirez left print for broadcasting, becoming news director for KQED, a public radio station in San Francisco. In that role and later as executive director for news and public affairs, he transformed KQED into a significant outlet for journalism in the Bay Area and California. He remained at KQED for 22 years until his death.

During that period he also taught journalism at San Francisco State University and at the Graduate School of Journalism at the University of California at Berkeley. He served on the board of directors of the Center for Investigative Reporting and was a fellow at Harvard University's Shorenstein Center on Media, Politics and Public Policy.

Among his awards: the World Affairs Council of Northern California for his reporting on a family's journey from rural China to the San Francisco Bay Area, and the Penney-Missouri Award for co-editing of the "Gay in America" series for The San Francisco Examiner in 1989. He was a founding director of the Latino Public Radio Consortium and led workshops on civic journalism and investigative reporting in the United States, Europe and Ukraine. Raul Ramirez was one of the co-founders of the International Institute for Regional Media and Information (IRMI, Ukraine).

== Personal life ==
Ramirez married Tony Wu on October 18, 2013, a month before he died.
