= Raúl Ramírez (Mexican footballer) =

Mexican footballer (born 1994)

Personal information
- Full name: Raúl Zerimar Ramírez Cota
- Date of birth: 19 November 1994 (age 31)
- Place of birth: Ahome, Sinaloa, Mexico
- Height: 1.70 m (5 ft 7 in)
- Position: Midfielder

Youth career
- 2013: Santos Los Mochis
- 2014–2015: Chiapas F.C. Reserves and Academy

Senior career*
Years	Team	Apps	(Gls)
2015–2017	Murciélagos	48	(3)
2017–2018	→ Pacific (loan)	32	(9)
2018–2019	U. de C.	43	(0)
2020–2021	U. de G.	23	(1)
2021–2022	Tritones Vallarta	10	(0)
- * Club domestic league appearances and goals as of 6 July 2019

Raúl Zerimar Ramírez Cota (Note: In this Spanish name, the first or paternal surname is Ramírez and the second or maternal family name is Cota.) (born November 19, 1994) is a Mexican professional footballer who currently plays for U. de G. He made his professional debut with Chiapas during a Copa MX defeat to Veracruz on 26 February 2014.
