= Food porn =

Glorified visual presentation of food

A commercial-style photograph of a cheeseburger

Macro photography of a strawberry pie

Food porn (or foodporn) is a glamourized visual presentation of cooking or eating in advertisements, infomercials, blogs, cooking shows, and other visual media. It often takes the form of food photography with styling that makes food look as tempting as possible, much like glamour photography or pornographic photography.

== History ==
The practice of turning food into a visual spectacle can be traced back to 16th-century Europe. An early version of the term, "gastro-porn", appeared in an article by Alexander Cockburn published in The New York Review of Books in December 1977. In it, Cockburn wrote, "True gastro-porn heightens the excitement and also the sense of the unattainable by proffering colored photographs of various completed recipes." Michael F. Jacobson used the term "food porn" in a 1979 newsletter of the Center for Science in the Public Interest. The term "food porn" was also used by the feminist critic Rosalind Coward in her 1984 book Female Desire, in which she wrote:

Cooking food and presenting it beautifully is an act of servitude. It is a way of expressing affection through a gift [...] That we should aspire to produce perfectly finished and presented food is a symbol of a willing and enjoyable participation in servicing others. Food pornography exactly sustains these meanings relating to the preparation of food. The kinds of picture used always repress the process of production of a meal. They are always beautifully lit, often touched up.

The term is not limited to the link between food and sexuality. In 2000, The Daily Telegraph reported that in the United States it was being applied to high-fat treats that food manufacturers were marketing as a reaction against low-calorie and diet foods.

In the United Kingdom, the term became popular in the 1990s through the television cookery programme Two Fat Ladies, after its producer described the "pornographic joy" the two presenters took in using large amounts of butter and cream.

Taking a photograph of food with a smartphone camera

Beginning in the early 2000s, the term saw increased use for food photography on social media. By May 2015, more than 54 million Instagram posts had used the foodporn hashtag. The market research company YPulse linked this to the large share of people aged 13 to 32 who post photos of their food on social media.

== Pornographic metaphor ==
Modern literature and film often link food and sexuality. Scholars have noted that eating and sex have long been connected, since both food and reproduction are basic needs for survival. In popular culture, the link between eating and sex is often made openly. In his book Food: The Key Concepts, Warren Belasco discusses how everyday language connects the kitchen and the bedroom: "these intensely sexualized associations between eating and loving make it difficult to adopt the asceticism implied in eating responsibly. If pastry, sugar, fat, meat, and salt are so closely tied to life's most intimately pleasurable experiences, who would ever want to cut back on them?" In describing "gastro-porn", Cockburn used the words "excitement" and "unattainable", suggesting an element of fantasy shared by food porn and conventional pornography. The rise of fad diets and exercise programmes in the 1980s was accompanied by growth in food-related media and in eating disorders. As people cut calories, food media became more popular because it let them indulge their food fantasies by watching, much as pornography does with sexual fantasies.

== See also ==
- Fast food advertising
- Food blogging
- Mukbang, online broadcasts of people eating large amounts of food while talking to viewers
