= Rumi Ide =

Japanese journalist and author

Rumi Ide (井出留美, Ide Rumi) is a Japanese journalist and author who writes about food loss and waste.

== Career ==
Ide worked at Lion Corporation and served with the Japan Overseas Cooperation Volunteers before joining Kellogg Japan, where she held several positions including section head in the public relations department.

She experienced the 2011 Tōhoku earthquake and tsunami on 11 March, which is her birthday. After seeing food discarded during the relief effort she left the company, and in 2011 founded the consultancy office 3.11, naming it after the date. She then spent three years as head of communications at the food bank Second Harvest Japan.

Ide contributed to the preparation of Japan's Act on the Promotion of Food Loss and Waste Reduction, which was enacted in 2019. She has said that Japan, unlike Italy, offers no preferential treatment for donating surplus food, and unlike France, imposes no penalties for discarding it.

With the help of students and volunteers, Ide has surveyed unsold ehōmaki sushi rolls at convenience stores and supermarkets and published estimates of how many go unsold across Japan. The BBC reported in 2024 that her figures put the number of rolls left unsold nationwide at close to one million, and included her among those working to quantify food waste in the country.

Champions 12.3, a coalition working towards United Nations Sustainable Development Goal target 12.3, lists Ide's consultancy office 3.11 among its Friends of Champions.

== Selected works ==
- Shōmi kigen no uso [The Myth of Best-Before Dates] (Gentosha, 2016)
- Shokuryō kiki [The Food Crisis] (PHP Institute, 2020)
- Suterarenai pan'ya no chōsen [The Challenge of the Bakery That Throws Nothing Away] (Akane Shobo, 2021)
- Watashitachi wa nani o sutete iru no ka [What Are We Throwing Away?] (Chikuma Shobo, 2025)

== Awards ==
- Food Life Journalist Award, food culture category (2018)
- Yahoo! News Author Award (2018)
- Consumer Affairs Agency Director-General's Award, Food Loss and Waste Reduction Promotion Awards (2020)
