= Food blogging =

Form of online journalism

Food blogging is a feature of food journalism that interlinks a gourmet interest in food, blog writing, and food photography. Food blogs are generally written by food enthusiasts, often referred to as "foodies", and can be used commercially by the blogger to earn a profit. The first food blog launched in July 1997 as a running feature on the Chowhound website. Titled "What Jim Had for Dinner", Chowhound founder Jim Leff cataloged his daily eating.

The majority of food blogs use pictures taken by the author, and some of them focus specifically on food photography. Food blogs can include recipes, travel writing, and restaurant or product reviews. Most typically, a food blog has overlapping elements of all or some of these elements.

== Food and travel ==
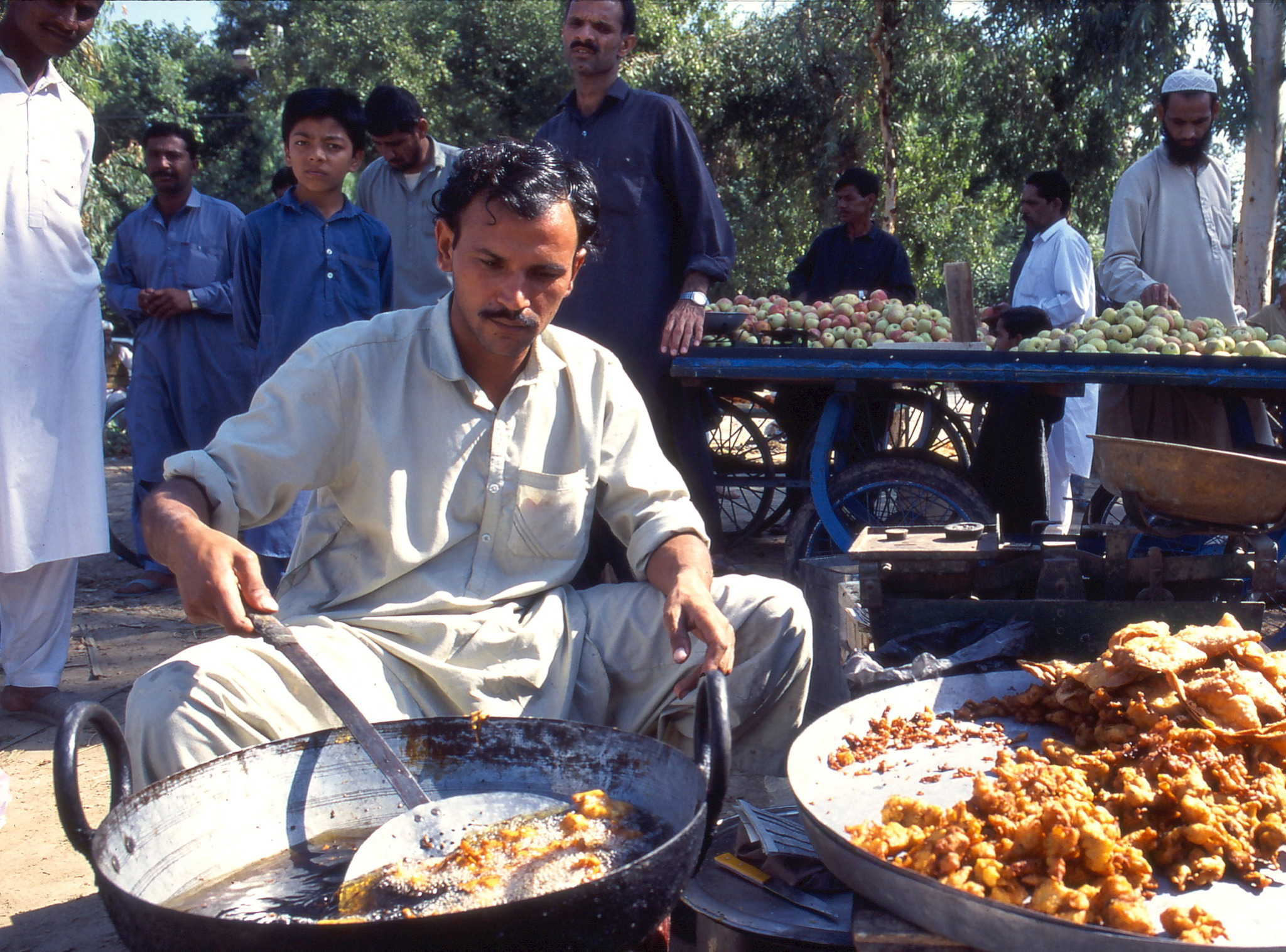
Common street food vendor in Pakistan

Food and travel is a type of blogging that involves the engagement of different cultures. These bloggers travel around the globe, eating food in different cities and documenting their experiences as they go. Food and travel blogging involves research, shooting, editing, investing, publishing, and scheduling.

== Food photography ==
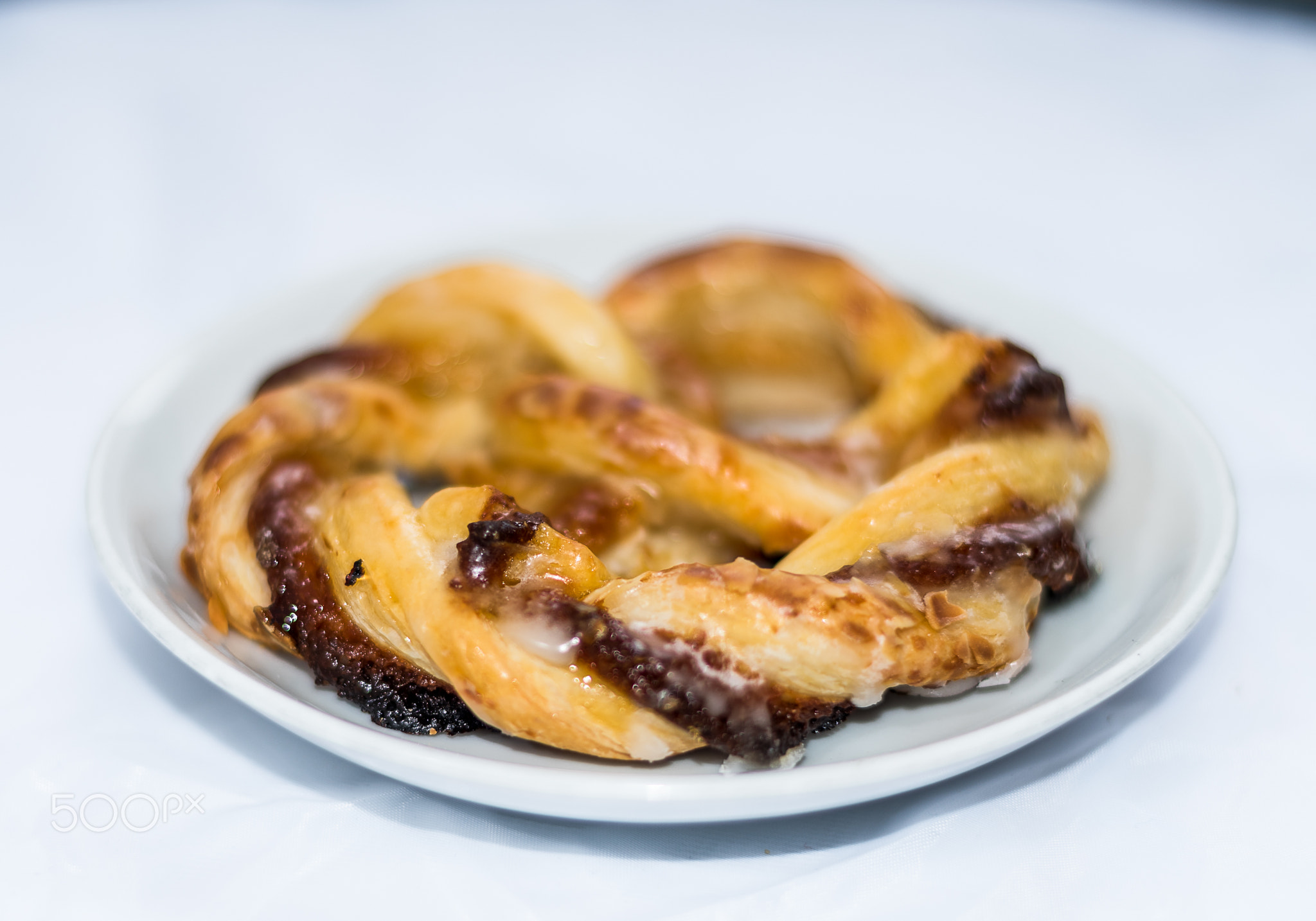
Professionally shot photos are used for marketing and advertising.

Food photography is the art of creating appetizing images using techniques such as lighting, arrangement, and background to be used commercially by the photographer. The visual appeal of the food alone can influence food photographers and bloggers. The degree to which a food blogger relies on food photography varies from blog to blog. Food photography can help construct the narrative of a food blog and can be used to attract an audience.

== Influencers and marketing ==
Blogging is a common marketing and brand development tool for restaurants, catering companies, meal delivery services, private chefs, and other food and beverage businesses. Businesses often choose influential bloggers in the market, or "influencers". Influencers can draw a specific audience and build their reputation by consistently posting quality content. Over time, the blogger accumulates influence over some of their audience. Consumers typically build a connection with the influencers they closely follow, which affects their purchasing decisions. Audiences often trust the endorsement of influencers because, while they can be sponsored, they are loyal to their followers and have the freedom to design their messages. This is what the blogger can "sell" to companies whose products and services they'd endorse or be sponsored by.

The more popular a blog is, the more opportunities the blogger will have to monetize their content. Bloggers use a variety of business and marketing tactics to maximize traffic, including constructing a persona that can connect with a targeted audience.

== Audience ==
Although most bloggers are not necessarily experts in their area of practice, this does not discourage online traffic. Influencer audiences are highly reactive to content like photos, videos, precise instructions, or descriptions about the flow of cooking, eating, or even dieting. The loyalty that consumers exhibit to bloggers they follow presents those bloggers with inconspicuous business opportunities. The majority of feedback is positive and suggestive. For the most part, people follow food blogs to experiment with new recipes, and become aware of new food trends, restaurants, and other creative ideas these thought leaders have to offer.

Popular food bloggers are informative and persuasive, having been posed between consumers and producers. The impact of processing or cognitive fluency is in play when discussing the most impactful blog posts. The bloggers who write, make visual demonstrations, guides, and other easily digestible content for consumers, often yield the most feedback from their followers.

Being a food expert has almost nothing to do with running a successful food blog. The blogger's persona, persuasion, engagement style, and image content, are some main components of the influence a blogger gains.
