= Joey Beltran =

American mixed martial artist

- Born: December 8, 1981 (age 44); Oceanside, California, U.S.
- Other names: The Mexicutioner
- Height: 6 ft 1 in (1.85 m)
- Weight: 236 lb (107 kg; 17 st)
- Division: Heavyweight (2007–2012, 2016, 2018); Light Heavyweight (2012–2016, 2019); Middleweight (2015)
- Reach: 75 in (191 cm)
- Style: Boxing, BJJ, Greco-Roman wrestling
- Stance: Orthodox
- Fighting out of: Carlsbad, California, United States
- Team: Bulls Pen (formerly); North County Fight Club / Blackline Fight Group (2006–2012); Alliance MMA (2010–2017); HB Ultimate Training Center (formerly); UFC Gym Oceanside (2017–2021)
- Rank: Brown belt in Brazilian Jiu-Jitsu under Jimmy Harbison
- Years active: 2007–present

Mixed martial arts record
- Total: 34
- Wins: 18
- By knockout: 12
- By submission: 2
- By decision: 4
- Losses: 15
- By knockout: 5
- By submission: 1
- By decision: 9
- No contests: 1

Other information
- Mixed martial arts record from Sherdog

Joey Beltran (born December 9, 1981) is an American bare-knuckle fighter and mixed martial artist. A professional mixed martial artist since 2007, he has competed for the UFC, Bellator, Strikeforce, and King of the Cage. He also competed in the Bare Knuckle Fighting Championship where he was the former BKFC Heavyweight Champion.

== Background ==
Beltran was born in Oceanside, California, and raised in Carlsbad, California, by a single mother. He has an older sister. Beltran began boxing when he was 10 years old, and also was involved in street fighting from a young age. Beltran also began wrestling in middle school and was talented, but was initially not allowed to compete outside of practice because of poor grades and was eventually kicked out from the junior high. Beltran continued wrestling at Carlsbad High School during his sophomore year and picked up his grades, going on to compete on the varsity team as a Heavyweight for all three years and also became involved in Greco-Roman wrestling. Beltran originally attended Palomar College, and after two years he academically transferred to the University of Hawaii at Manoa. During the first semester, Beltran was introduced to mixed martial arts at a local gym, Bulls Pen. After the semester, Beltran moved back to California, attending MiraCosta College for a spell before dropping out in pursuit of a career in mixed martial arts. When he began training, Beltran weighed 300 lbs.

== Mixed martial arts career ==
=== Early career ===
Beltran made his professional debut on February 10, 2007, at Strikeforce: Young Guns and lost via unanimous decision. He went on to compile a record of 6–2 before being signed by Bellator.

=== Bellator ===
Beltran made his Bellator debut at Bellator 5 on May 1, 2009, against former UFC fighter Sherman Pendergarst. Beltran won the fight in the first round via TKO.

In his next appearance, under the King of the Cage banner, Beltran defeated Wes Combs via TKO only 25 seconds into the fight.

Beltran would go 1–1 before picking up another TKO win over another UFC veteran, Houston Alexander, and was subsequently signed by the UFC.

=== Ultimate Fighting Championship ===
Beltran made his UFC debut at UFC 109 against Brazilian jiu-jitsu black belt, Rolles Gracie. Beltran was stepping in as a last minute replacement for Gracie's original opponent, Mostapha Al-turk. Beltran upset the fatigued Gracie and was victorious via a second round TKO.

Beltran returned to action on May 8, 2010, at UFC 113. He was originally set to fight Chad Corvin, but after Corvin's paperwork was not approved by the Quebec Athletic Commission he was pulled from the card and replaced by Tim Hague. Beltran defeated Hague after three rounds, taking the unanimous decision.

Beltran next faced Matt Mitrione on September 25, 2010, at UFC 119. Beltran fought and lost to Mitrione via unanimous decision. Even though he lost, he still earned Fight of the Night honors.

Beltran then fought highly regarded kickboxer Pat Barry at UFC Fight for the Troops 2 on January 22, 2011, in Fort Hood, Texas. He lost the fight via unanimous decision. During the fight, Beltran received a high volume of leg kicks from Barry, a former K-1 kickboxing competitor, yet only collapsed at the end of the final round. Barry has since expressed his bewilderment at the level of punishment that Beltran was able to absorb.

Beltran was expected to face promotional newcomer Dave Herman on June 11, 2011, at UFC 131. However, after Herman was shuffled to the main card, Beltran instead faced another UFC newcomer in Aaron Rosa. After a back-and-forth first two rounds, Beltran defeated Rosa via TKO in the third round.

Beltran fought Stipe Miocic on October 8, 2011, at UFC 136, losing via unanimous decision.

Beltran faced former Strikeforce heavyweight Lavar Johnson on January 28, 2012, at UFC on Fox: Evans vs. Davis, where he was knocked out for the first time in his career in the first round. Following the loss, Beltran was released from the promotion.

=== Post-UFC ===
After being released, Beltran announced that he would be dropping down to compete in the Light heavyweight division. He officially made his Light heavyweight debut on April 28, 2012, at C3 Fights in Oklahoma, where he defeated Anton Talamantes via unanimous decision.

=== Return to the UFC ===
Beltran made his return to the UFC replacing Brandon Vera against Australian James Te Huna on July 11, 2012, at UFC on Fuel TV 4. Although Beltran lost via unanimous decision, the back and forth bout earned Fight of the Night honors.

Beltran was expected to face Anthony Perosh on December 15, 2012, at UFC on FX 6. However, Perosh was forced from the bout with a toe injury and replaced by Igor Pokrajac. He won the fight via unanimous decision. On January 10, 2013, it was announced that Beltran had failed his post fight drug test, testing positive for nandrolone. Beltran was subsequently suspended for 9 months, retroactive to December 14, 2012. His win over Pokrajac was changed to a No Contest.

Returning from his suspension, Beltran faced Fábio Maldonado on October 9, 2013, at UFC Fight Night 29 in Maldonado's home-country of Brazil. He lost the back-and-forth fight via split decision. He was subsequently released from the promotion.

=== Return to Bellator ===
On October 30, 2013, it was announced that Beltran had signed with Bellator MMA. He faced former UFC Light heavyweight Champion Quinton "Rampage" Jackson on November 15, 2013, in the main event at Bellator 108. He lost the fight via TKO in the first round.

Beltran faced Vladimir Matyushenko at Bellator 116 on April 11, 2014, winning by third round submission, his first submission win since 2007.

==== Bellator title shot ====
Beltran challenged Emanuel Newton for the Bellator Light heavyweight Championship at Bellator 124 on September 12, 2014. He lost the fight via knockout in the third round.

==== Drop down to middleweight ====
Beltran made his Middleweight debut against Brian Rogers on April 10, 2015, at Bellator 136. He won the fight by majority decision.

Beltran next faced Kendall Grove at Bellator 143 on September 25, 2015. He lost the fight via TKO in the third round.

On September 21, 2016, it was announced that Beltran would be facing Alessio Sakara in the co-main event of Bellator 168 on December 10, 2016. He lost via knockout in the first round. He was subsequently released from the promotion.

=== Post-Bellator and rehab ===
After the latest loss and release, Beltran succumbed into alcohol and drug addiction and entered rehabilitation. Having already essentially retired after his latest fight, Beltran was lured to face Sergei Kharitonov at Russian Cagefighting Championship 1 on February 25, 2018. He lost the fight via unanimous decision.

He would take yet another fight in the Russian circuit against Dmitry Tebekin at S-70 event on August 14, 2019, winning the fight via unanimous decision.

== Bare knuckle boxing ==
After having problems with getting fights in the regional circuit, an opportunity presented itself to compete in bare-knuckle boxing. In his debut Beltran faced Tony Lopez - who he had twice previously lost to in MMA - at the inaugural Bare Knuckle FC BKFC 1 event held on June 2, 2018. The bout also served as an alternate bout for the BKFC Heavyweight Tournament. He won the brutal back-and-forth fight via unanimous decision.

=== BKFC World Heavyweight Championship ===
At BKFC 9 Beltran won a unanimous decision victory over Chase Sherman, becoming the BKFC World Heavyweight Champion, as well as the National Police Gazette Heavyweight American Champion.

Beltran was expected to defend his title against Mark Godbeer at BKFC 12 on April 11, 2020. However, the whole event was postponed due to the COVID-19 pandemic and the bout was scrapped.

On October 10, 2020, at BKFC 13, Beltran became the first man to defend the BKFC World Heavyweight title by defeating former University of Alabama football linebacker Marcel Stamps via fourth round TKO. The outcome of this bout also resulted in Beltran retaining the Police Gazette Heavyweight World Championship, a title that had not been in the ring since 1899.

Beltran's second defense of the BKFC World Heavyweight Championship at BKFC 18 was against Sam Shewmaker. He won the bout via unanimous decision.

Beltran's next defense of the BKFC World Heavyweight Championship was against former BKFC World Heavyweight Champion Arnold Adams in a rematch on November 6, 2021, at BKFC Fight Night 3. He lost by unanimous decision, ending his reign as champion. This fight earned him the Fight of the Night award.

=== Post-championship reign ===
Beltran then faced Frank Tate at BKFC Fight Night 7 on April 21, 2022. He was knocked out just 23 seconds into the bout.

He then headlined BKFC 33 on November 18, 2022, against Houston Alexander in a rematch of their MMA bout in 2010. He lost the bout via second-round knockout. A month later, BKFC President Dave Feldman stated that Beltran would not fight for the company anymore.

== Personal life ==
Beltran was married to the BKFC Women's Strawweight Champion Britain Hart but divorced in 2023. He had his first child in July 2024.

== Championships and accomplishments ==
=== Bare-knuckle boxing ===
- Bare Knuckle Fighting Championship
  - BKFC World Heavyweight Champion (one time; former)
    - Two successful title defenses
  - Police Gazette World Heavyweight Champion (one time; former)
  - Fight of the Night (One time) vs. Arnold Adams 2

=== Mixed martial arts ===
- 5150 Combat League / Xtreme Fighting League
  - 5150 Combat League Heavyweight Championship (One time)
- Ultimate Fighting Championship
  - Fight of the Night (Two times) vs. James Te Huna and Matt Mitrione
  - UFC.com Awards
    - 2010: Ranked #6 Newcomer of the Year & Ranked #4 Upset of the Year vs. Rolles Gracie Jr.
    - 2012: Ranked #9 Fight of the Year vs. James Te Huna

== Mixed martial arts record ==
Professional record breakdown
34 matches	18 wins	15 losses
By knockout	12	5
By submission	2	1
By decision	4	9
No contests	1	

Res.	Record	Opponent	Method	Event	Date	Round	Time	Location	Notes
Win	18–15 (1)	Dmitry Tebekin	Decision (unanimous)	S-70: Plotforma Cup 2019	August 14, 2019	3	5:00	Sochi, Russia	Light Heavyweight bout.
Loss	17–15 (1)	Sergei Kharitonov	Decision (unanimous)	Russian Cagefighting Championship	February 25, 2018	3	5:00	Yekaterinburg, Russia	Heavyweight bout.
Loss	17–14 (1)	Alessio Sakara	KO (punches)	Bellator 168	December 10, 2016	1	1:20	Florence, Italy	Light Heavyweight bout.
Loss	17–13 (1)	Chase Gormley	Decision (split)	Bellator 155	May 20, 2016	3	5:00	Boise, Idaho, United States	Heavyweight bout.
Win	17–12 (1)	Lamont Stafford	TKO (punches)	C3 Fights: Beltran vs Stafford	December 5, 2015	1	4:14	Newkirk, Oklahoma, United States	Light Heavyweight bout.
Loss	16–12 (1)	Kendall Grove	TKO (punches)	Bellator 143	September 25, 2015	3	2:27	Hidalgo, Texas, United States	
Win	16–11 (1)	Brian Rogers	Decision (majority)	Bellator 136	April 10, 2015	3	5:00	Irvine, California, United States	Middleweight debut.
Loss	15–11 (1)	Emanuel Newton	KO (spinning back fist)	Bellator 124	September 12, 2014	3	3:07	Plymouth Township, Michigan, United States	For the Bellator Light Heavyweight World Championship.
Win	15–10 (1)	Vladimir Matyushenko	Submission (north-south choke)	Bellator 116	April 11, 2014	3	3:06	Temecula, California, United States	
Loss	14–10 (1)	Quinton Jackson	KO (punches)	Bellator 108	November 15, 2013	1	4:59	Atlantic City, New Jersey, United States	Catchweight (210) lbs bout.
Loss	14–9 (1)	Fábio Maldonado	Decision (split)	UFC Fight Night: Maia vs. Shields	October 9, 2013	3	5:00	Barueri, Brazil	
NC	14–8 (1)	Igor Pokrajac	NC (overturned)	UFC on FX: Sotiropoulos vs. Pearson	December 15, 2012	3	5:00	Gold Coast, Australia	Originally unanimous decision win; Overturned as Beltran tested positive for nandrolone.
Loss	14–8	James Te Huna	Decision (unanimous)	UFC on Fuel TV: Munoz vs. Weidman	July 11, 2012	3	5:00	San Jose, California, United States	Fight of the Night.
Win	14–7	Anton Talamantes	Decision (unanimous)	C3 Fights	April 28, 2012	3	5:00	Newkirk, Oklahoma, United States	Light Heavyweight debut.
Loss	13–7	Lavar Johnson	KO (punches)	UFC on Fox: Evans vs. Davis	January 28, 2012	1	4:24	Chicago, Illinois, United States	
Loss	13–6	Stipe Miocic	Decision (unanimous)	UFC 136	October 8, 2011	3	5:00	Houston, Texas, United States	
Win	13–5	Aaron Rosa	TKO (punches)	UFC 131	June 11, 2011	3	1:26	Vancouver, British Columbia, Canada	
Loss	12–5	Pat Barry	Decision (unanimous)	UFC: Fight For The Troops 2	January 22, 2011	3	5:00	Fort Hood, Texas, United States	
Loss	12–4	Matt Mitrione	Decision (unanimous)	UFC 119	September 25, 2010	3	5:00	Indianapolis, Indiana, United States	Fight of the Night.
Win	12–3	Tim Hague	Decision (unanimous)	UFC 113	May 8, 2010	3	5:00	Montreal, Quebec, Canada	
Win	11–3	Rolles Gracie Jr.	TKO (punches)	UFC 109	February 6, 2010	2	1:31	Las Vegas, Nevada, United States	
Win	10–3	Houston Alexander	TKO (punches)	5150 Combat League / Xtreme Fighting League: New Year's Revolution	January 16, 2010	2	3:49	Tulsa, Oklahoma, United States	Won the 5150 Combat League Heavyweight Championship.
Loss	9–3	Tony Lopez	Decision (unanimous)	KOTC: Distorted	October 1, 2009	5	5:00	Highland, California, United States	For the KOTC Heavyweight Championship.
Win	9–2	Tracy Willis	TKO (punches and elbows)	5150 Combat League: Rumble at the Rally	June 27, 2009	1	3:33	Sparks, Oklahoma, United States	
Win	8–2	Wes Combs	TKO (punches)	KOTC: Legends	June 6, 2009	1	0:25	Winterhaven, California, United States	
Win	7–2	Sherman Pendergarst	TKO (punches)	Bellator 5	May 1, 2009	1	2:24	Dayton, Ohio, United States	
Win	6–2	Jacob Browy	TKO (punches)	Gladiator Challenge: Warriors	February 4, 2009	1	1:20	Pauma Valley, California, United States	
Win	5–2	Wes Fenton	TKO (punches)	Total Combat 32	October 2, 2008	1	2:15	El Cajon, California, United States	
Loss	4–2	Tony Lopez	Submission (kimura)	KOTC: Opposing Force	May 15, 2008	1	3:15	Highland, California, United States	
Win	4–1	Phil Friedman	TKO (punches)	Total Combat 28	April 26, 2008	1	0:50	San Diego, California, United States	
Win	3–1	Ray Seraile	TKO (punches)	TC 25: Fight Club	December 15, 2007	2	0:56	San Diego, California, United States	
Win	2–1	Tony Velarde	Submission (kimura)	Total Combat 21	June 8, 2007	1	2:35	San Diego, California, United States	
Win	1–1	Paul Ingrassia	TKO (punches)	Total Combat 20	April 13, 2007	1	2:54	San Diego, California, United States	
Loss	0–1	Yohan Banks	Decision (unanimous)	Strikeforce: Young Guns	February 10, 2007	3	3:00	San Jose, California, United States	

== Bare knuckle record ==
Professional record breakdown
10 matches	5 wins	4 losses
By knockout	2	3
By decision	3	1
Draws	1	

Res.	Record	Opponent	Method	Event	Date	Round	Time	Location	Notes
Loss	5–4–1	Houston Alexander	KO (punches)	BKFC 33	November 18, 2022	2	0:38	Omaha, Nebraska, United States	Cruiserweight debut.
Loss	5–3–1	Frank Tate	KO (punches)	BKFC Fight Night: Ft. Lauderdale: Beltran vs. Tate	April 21, 2022	1	0:23	Fort Lauderdale, Florida, United States	
Loss	5–2–1	Arnold Adams	Decision (unanimous)	BKFC Fight Night New York: Beltran vs. Adams	November 6, 2021	5	2:00	Salamanca, New York, United States	Lost the BKFC Heavyweight Championship. Fight of the Night.
Win	5–1–1	Sam Shewmaker	Decision (unanimous)	BKFC 18	June 26, 2021	5	2:00	Miami, Florida, United States	Defended the BKFC Heavyweight Championship.
Win	4–1–1	Marcel Stamps	KO (punches)	BKFC 13	October 10, 2020	4	1:55	Salina, Kansas, United States	Defended the BKFC Heavyweight Championship.
Win	3–1–1	Chase Sherman	Decision (unanimous)	BKFC 9	November 16, 2019	5	2:00	Biloxi, Mississippi, United States	Won the BKFC Heavyweight Championship & Police Gazette Heavyweight American Championship.
Win	2–1–1	Jamie Campbell	TKO (punches)	BKFC 6	June 22, 2019	2	1:50	Tampa, Florida, United States	
Draw	1–1–1	Tony Lopez	Draw (split)	BKFC 4	February 2, 2019	5	2:00	Cancun, Mexico	
Loss	1–1	Arnold Adams	TKO (doctor stoppage)	BKFC 2	August 25, 2018	4	0:09	Biloxi, Mississippi, United States	
Win	1–0	Tony Lopez	Decision (unanimous)	BKFC 1	June 2, 2018	5	2:00	Cheyenne, Wyoming, United States	

== See also ==
- List of male mixed martial artists
- List of Brazilian jiu-jitsu practitioners
- List of current Bellator fighters
