= Arnold Adams =

American mixed martial artist and bare-knuckle boxer

- Born: July 9, 1985 (age 41); Fairbanks, Alaska, United States
- Other names: Bomaye
- Height: 6 ft 3 in (1.91 m)
- Weight: 265 lb (120 kg; 18.9 st)
- Division: Heavyweight
- Fighting out of: Oak Forest, Illinois, United States
- Years active: 2018–2016 (MMA); 2018-present (Bare-knuckle boxing)

Mixed martial arts record
- Total: 17
- Wins: 7
- By knockout: 4
- By submission: 1
- By decision: 2
- Losses: 10
- By knockout: 3
- By submission: 2
- By decision: 5

Bare-knuckle boxing record
- Total: 12
- Wins: 7
- By knockout: 5
- Losses: 5
- By knockout: 4

Other information
- Mixed martial arts record from Sherdog

Arnold Adams (born July 9, 1985) is an American mixed martial artist and bare-knuckle boxer. He currently competes in the Bare Knuckle Fighting Championship, where he is the inaugural and a two-time BKFC Heavyweight Champion. As of July 10, 2026, he is #5 in the BKFC Heavyweight rankings.

== Mixed martial arts career ==
Adams started his professional MMA career in 2008 and competed until 2016. Throughout his career, he compiled a 7-10 professional record.

== Bare-knuckle boxing career ==
=== Bare Knuckle Fighting Championship ===
==== Heavyweight Tournament & BKFC Heavyweight Champion ====
In his BKFC debut Adams faced DJ Linderman in the Heavyweight Tournament Quarter-Finals, at the inaugural Bare Knuckle FC BKFC 1 event held on June 2, 2018. He won the bout via unanimous decision.

Heading into the semi-final, Adams faced Joey Beltran at BKFC 2 on August 25, 2018. He won the fight by fourth-round technical knockout. This fight earned him the Fight of the Night award.

Adams faced Sam Shewmaker in the heavyweight tournament final, at BKFC 3 on October 20, 2018. He won the bout via split decision to become the first BKFC heavyweight champion and Police Gazette Heavyweight American Champion.

In his first title defense, Adams faced Chase Sherman at BKFC 7 on August 10, 2019. He lost the fight by unanimous decision.

==== Post-title reign ====
Adams faced Bobo O'Bannon at BKFC 16 on March 19, 2021. He won the fight via first-round knockout. This fight earned him the Knockout of the Night award.

Adams faced Mick Terrill at BKFC 19 on July 23, 2021. He won the bout via third-round knockout.

==== Second title reign ====
Adams faced defending BKFC World Heavyweight Champion Joey Beltran in a rematch on November 6, 2021, at BKFC Fight Night 3. He won the bout by unanimous decision, thus becoming BKFC Heavyweight Champion once again.

Adams faced Dillon Cleckler on May 6, 2022, at BKFC 25. He won the bout by knockout in the second round to defend the title. This fight earned him another Fight of the Night award.

Adams faced Alan Belcher at BKFC 36 on February 24, 2023. He lost the title via third-round knockout.

Adams faced Mick Terrill in a rematch for the vacant BKFC Heavyweight Championship on December 2, 2023, at BKFC 56. He lost the bout by fourth-round knockout.

==== Post championship ====
Adams faced Leonardo Perdomo in the main event on July 12, 2025 at BKFC 78. He lost the fight by knockout in the first round.

Adams faced Leonardo Perdomo in a rematch on September 12, 2025 in the main event at BKFC 80. He lost the fight again by knockout in the first round.

Adams faced Steve Banks on June 26, 2026 at BKFC Fight Night 41. He won the fight by knockout in the second round.

== Championships and accomplishments ==
=== Bare-knuckle boxing ===
- Bare Knuckle Fighting Championship
  - BKFC Heavyweight World Champion (Two times; inaugural)
  - Police Gazette Heavyweight American Champion (One time)
  - Fight of the Night (One time) vs. Joey Beltran 2
  - Knockout of the Night (Two times) vs. Bobo O'Bannon and Dillon Cleckler

=== Mixed martial arts ===
- Hoosier Fight Club
  - Hoosier FC Heavyweight Championship (One time)
- Fight Club OC
  - FCOC Super Heavyweight Championship (One time)

== Mixed martial arts record ==
Professional record breakdown
17 matches	7 wins	10 losses
By knockout	4	3
By submission	1	2
By decision	2	5

Res.	Record	Opponent	Method	Event	Date	Round	Time	Location	Notes
Loss	7–10	Don'Tale Mayes	TKO (submission to punches)	HFC 29	June 4, 2016	5	3:09	Hammond, Indiana, United States	Lost the Hoosier FC Heavyweight Championship.
Win	7–9	Daniel James	TKO (punches)	HFC 27	February 6, 2016	1	2:06	Michigan City, Indiana, United States	Won the Hoosier FC Heavyweight Championship.
Win	6–9	Aaron Noel	KO (knee)	Duneland Classic 9	October 30, 2015	1	1:51	La Porte, Indiana, United States	
Win	5–9	Miodrag Petkovic	TKO (punches)	United Combat League: Cut Throat	September 19, 2015	3	1:13	Hammond, Indiana, United States	
Loss	4–9	Leroy Johnson	Decision (unanimous)	Camp Lejeune: For the Leathernecks 4	September 2, 2015	3	4:00	Jacksonville, North Carolina, United States	For the FCOC Heavyweight Championship.
Win	4–8	William Baptiste	Decision (unanimous)	FCOC: For the Leathernecks IV	May 8, 2015	3	4:00	Jacksonville, North Carolina, United States	Won the vacant FCOC Super Heavyweight Championship.
Loss	3–8	Robert Neal	Decision (unanimous)	Conflict MMA 20: Fight Club Series	September 27, 2014	3	5:00	Macon, Georgia, United States	
Loss	3–7	Allen Crowder	Decision (unanimous)	RDMMA: Battle in the South 9	August 2, 2014	3	4:00	Wilmington, North Carolina, United States	
Win	3–6	Lindsay Rowse	Submission (verbal)	Conflict MMA 17: Havoc at the Civic Center 3	April 26, 2014	1	2:38	Savannah, Georgia, United States	
Loss	2–6	Allen Crowder	Submission (choke)	RDMMA: Battle in the South 8	March 22, 2014	2	0:31	Las Vegas, Nevada, United States	
Win	2–5	Tomar Washington	Decision (split)	Conflict MMA: Carolina Cage Fights 16	February 15, 2014	3	5:00	North Charleston, South Carolina, United States	
Loss	1–5	Adrian Henderson	Decision (unanimous)	Conflict MMA: Carolina Cage Fights 15	December 7, 2013	3	5:00	North Charleston, South Carolina, United States	
Win	1–4	Joe Council	TKO (punches)	Conflict MMA: Carolina Cage Fights 13	September 14, 2013	1	4:16	North Charleston, South Carolina, United States	
Loss	0–4	Brandon Sayles	TKO (punches)	DPP: The Real Deal	January 15, 2010	1	3:21	Columbus, Georgia, United States	
Loss	0–3	John Hawk	Decision (unanimous)	UMMAXX: All Heart, No Fear	August 15, 2009	3	5:00	Akron, Ohio, United States	
Loss	0–2	Ed Carpenter	Submission (punches)	ISCF: Bad Intentions	December 13, 2008	1	3:42	Wisconsin Dells, Wisconsin, United States	
Loss	0–1	Boban Simic	KO	C3: Domination	November 22, 2008	1	2:50	Hammond, Indiana, United States	

== Bare knuckle record ==
Professional record breakdown
12 matches	7 wins	5 losses
By knockout	5	4
By decision	2	1

Res.	Record	Opponent	Method	Event	Date	Round	Time	Location	Notes
Win	8–5	Steve Banks	KO (punches)	BKFC Fight Night Hammond: VanCamp vs. Cisneros	June 26, 2026	2	1:21	Hammond, Indiana, United States	
Loss	7–5	Leonardo Perdomo	KO	BKFC 80	September 12, 2025	1	1:09	Hollywood, Florida, United States	
Loss	7–4	Leonardo Perdomo	KO	BKFC 78	July 12, 2025	1	1:26	Hollywood, Florida, United States	
Loss	7–3	Mick Terrill	KO (punches)	BKFC 56	December 2, 2023	4	0:47	Salt Lake City, Utah, United States	For the vacant BKFC Heavyweight Championship.
Loss	7–2	Alan Belcher	KO (punches)	BKFC 36	February 24, 2023	2	0:34	Kenner, Louisiana, United States	Lost the BKFC Heavyweight Championship.
Win	7–1	Dillon Cleckler	KO (punches)	BKFC 25	May 6, 2022	2	0:34	Orlando, Florida, United States	Defended the BKFC Heavyweight Championship. Knockout of the Night.
Win	6–1	Joey Beltran	Decision (unanimous)	BKFC Fight Night New York: Beltran vs. Adams	November 6, 2021	5	2:00	Salamanca, New York, United States	Won the BKFC Heavyweight Championship. Fight of the Night.
Win	5–1	Mick Terrill	KO (punch)	BKFC 19	July 23, 2021	3	0:38	Tampa, Florida, United States	
Win	4–1	Bobo O'Bannon	TKO (punches)	BKFC 16	March 19, 2021	1	1:58	Biloxi, Mississippi, United States	Knockout of the Night.
Loss	3–1	Chase Sherman	Decision (unanimous)	BKFC 7	August 10, 2019	5	2:00	Biloxi, Mississippi, United States	Lost the BKFC Heavyweight Championship & Police Gazette Heavyweight American Championship.
Win	3–0	Sam Shewmaker	Decision (split)	BKFC 3	October 20, 2018	5	2:00	Biloxi, Mississippi, United States	Heavyweight Tournament Final, won the vacant BKFC Heavyweight Championship and vacant Police Gazette Heavyweight American Championship
Win	2–0	Joey Beltran	TKO (doctor stoppage)	BKFC 2	August 25, 2018	4	0:09	Biloxi, Mississippi, United States	
Win	1–0	D.J. Linderman	TKO (doctor stoppage)	BKFC 1	June 2, 2018	2	2:00	Cheyenne, Wyoming, United States	
