= 2018 in Bare Knuckle Fighting Championship =

Information
- First date: June 2, 2018
- Last date: October 20, 2018

Events
- Total events: 3

Fights
- Total fights: 31
- Title fights: 2

Chronology
2018 in Bare Knuckle Fighting Championship	2019 in Bare Knuckle Fighting Championship

The year 2018 is the first year in the history of the Bare Knuckle Fighting Championship, a bare-knuckle fighting promotion based in Philadelphia. The season started with Bare Knuckle Fighting Championship 1: The Beginning. BKFC is available on PPV all over the world and on FITE TV.

== Background ==
=== Heavyweight Championship Tournament Bracket ===
Quarter-Finals; BKFC 1
(United States) Arnold Adams	TKO
(United States) DJ Linderman	2R.
(United States) Lewis Rumsey	5R.
(United States) Ricco Rodriguez	UD
(United States) Eric Prindle	1R.
(United States) Sam Shewmaker	KO
(United States) Dale Sopi	1R.
(United States) Maurice Jackson	KO

Semi-Finals; BKFC 2
(United States) Arnold Adams	TKO
(United States) Joey Beltran	4R.
(United States) Sam Shewmaker	SD
(United States) Maurice Jackson	5R.

Final; BKFC 3
(United States) Arnold Adams	SD
(United States) Sam Shewmaker	5R.

- Joey Beltran replaced injured Ricco Rodriguez in the semi-finals.

== List of events ==
#	Event	Date	Venue	Location
1	BKFC 1: The Beginning	June 2, 2018	Cheyenne Ice and Events Center	(United States) Cheyenne, Wyoming, USA
2	BKFC 2: A New Era	August 25, 2018	Mississippi Coast Coliseum	(United States) Biloxi, Mississippi, USA
3	BKFC 3: Adams vs. Shewmaker	October 20, 2018	Mississippi Coast Coliseum	(United States) Biloxi, Mississippi, USA

== BKFC 1: The Beginning ==
BKFC 1: The Beginning
- Promotion: Bare Knuckle Fighting Championship
- Date: June 2, 2018
- Venue: Cheyenne Ice and Events Center
- City: (United States) Cheyenne, Wyoming, USA

BKFC 1: The Beginning was a bare-knuckle fighting event held by Bare Knuckle Fighting Championship on June 2, 2018, at the Cheyenne Ice and Events Center in Cheyenne, Wyoming, USA.

=== Background ===
This was the first bare-knuckle boxing event by Bare Knuckle Fighting Championship (BKFC) and the first sanctioned bare-knuckle boxing event in the United States since 1889.

This event featured the quarter-final of a 8-Man Heavyweight Tournament.

=== Results ===
BKFC 1: The Beginning
Weight Class				Method	Round	Time	Notes
Heavyweight 120 kg	(United States) Ricco Rodriguez	def.	(United States) Lewis Rumsey	Decision (unanimous)	5	2:00	Heavyweight Tournament Quarter-Finals. 50-45, 50-45, 48-47.
Heavyweight 120 kg	(United States) Joey Beltran	def.	(United States) Tony Lopez	Decision (unanimous)	5	2:00	Heavyweight Tournament Alternate. 49-45, 49-45, 49-46.
Women's Featherweight 57 kg	(Australia) Bec Rawlings	def.	(United States) Alma Garcia	TKO (doctor stoppage)	2	2:00	
Heavyweight 120 kg	(United States) Sam Shewmaker	def.	(United States) Eric Prindle	KO (punch)	1	0:18	Heavyweight Tournament Quarter-Finals
Heavyweight 120 kg	(Canada) Bobby Gunn	def.	(Brazil) Irineu Beato Costa Junior	KO (punches)	1	0:41	
Lightweight 62.5 kg	(United States) Johnny Bedford	def.	(United States) Nick Mamalis	TKO (punches)	2	1:41	
Lightweight 62.5 kg	(United States) Reggie Barnett Jr.	def.	(United States) Travis Thompson	Decision (unanimous)	5	2:00	50-45, 50-45, 50-45
Heavyweight 120 kg	(United States) Maurice Jackson	def.	(United States) Dale Sopi	TKO (punches)	1	1:10	Heavyweight Tournament Quarter-Finals
Middleweight 75 kg	(United States) Estevan Payan	def.	(United States) Omar Avelar	KO (punches)	1	1:57	
Heavyweight 120 kg	(United States) Arnold Adams	def.	(United States) D.J. Linderman	TKO (doctor stoppage)	2	2:00	Heavyweight Tournament Quarter-Finals

== BKFC 2: A New Era ==
BKFC 2: A New Era
- Promotion: Bare Knuckle Fighting Championship
- Date: August 25, 2018
- Venue: Mississippi Coast Coliseum
- City: (United States) Biloxi, Mississippi, USA

BKFC 2: A New Era was a bare-knuckle fighting event held by Bare Knuckle Fighting Championship on August 25, 2018, at the Mississippi Coast Coliseum in Biloxi, Mississippi, USA.

=== Background ===
This event featured the semi-final of a 8-Man Heavyweight Tournament.

The inaugural Police Gazette Women's Featherweight champion, Bec Rawlings, was awarded this title by the Bare Knuckle Boxing Hall of Fame 3 days after her win over Alma Garcia at BKFC 1, making her fight with Britain Hart her first title defense.

=== Results ===
BKFC 2: A New Era
Weight Class				Method	Round	Time	Notes
Women's Featherweight 57 kg	(Australia) Bec Rawlings (c)	def.	(United States) Britain Hart	Decision (split)	5	2:00	For the Police Gazette Women's Featherweight World Championship. 50-45, 49-45, 47-48.
Super Middleweight 80 kg	(United States) Chris Lytle	def.	(United States) Drew Lipton	TKO (retirement)	1	1:18	
Heavyweight 120 kg	(United States) Sam Shewmaker	def.	(United States) Maurice Jackson	Decision (split)	5	2:00	Heavyweight Tournament Semi-Finals. 46-48, 48-45, 49-45
Heavyweight 120 kg	(United States) Arnold Adams	def.	(United States) Joey Beltran	TKO (doctor stoppage)	5	0:09	Heavyweight Tournament Semi-Finals
Light Heavyweight 84 kg	(United States) Kendall Grove	def.	(United States) Bruce Abramski	Decision (unanimous)	5	2:00	Judges' scorecards not read.
Welterweight 66 kg	(United States) Michael McDonald	def.	(United States) Charles Bennett	TKO (hand injury)	4	1:49	
Heavyweight 120 kg	(United States) Jamie Campbell	def.	(United States) Dale Sopi	Decision (unanimous)	5	2:00	Judges' scorecards not read.
Lightweight 62.5 kg	(United States) Reggie Barnett Jr.	def.	(United States) James Clayton Burns	Decision (unanimous)	5	2:00	Judges' scorecards not read.
Preliminary Card
Middleweight 75 kg	(Mexico) Diego Garijo	def.	(United States) Tom Shoaff	KO (punches)	1	1:19	
Heavyweight 120 kg	(United States) Jimmy Jennett	def.	(United States) Tony Lopez	Decision (unanimous)	5	2:00	Judges' scorecards not read.
Middleweight 75 kg	(United States) Harris Stephenson	def.	(Mexico) Jorge Gonzalez	KO (punches)	1		
Light Heavyweight 84 kg	(United States) Marcel Stamps	def.	(United States) Brandon Martin	KO (punches)	1		

== BKFC 3: Adams vs. Shewmaker ==
BKFC 3: Adams vs. Shewmaker
- Promotion: Bare Knuckle Fighting Championship
- Date: October 20, 2018
- Venue: Mississippi Coast Coliseum
- City: (United States) Biloxi, Mississippi, USA

BKFC 3: Adams vs. Shewmaker (also known as BKFC 3: The Takeover) was a bare-knuckle fighting event held by Bare Knuckle Fighting Championship on October 20, 2018, at the Mississippi Coast Coliseum in Biloxi, Mississippi, USA.

=== Background ===
This event featured the final of a 8-Man Heavyweight Tournament to crown the inaugural BKFC Heavyweight Champion. The event also featured the quarter-final of a 8-Man Lightweight Tournament.

A planned Lightweight Tournament Quarter-Final matchup between Reggie Barnett Jr and Josue Rivera was cancelled when Rivera no-showed the event causing Barnett Jr to advance to the semi-finals due to forfeit.

=== Results ===
BKFC 3: Adams vs. Shewmaker
Weight Class				Method	Round	Time	Notes
Heavyweight 120 kg	(United States) Arnold Adams	def.	(United States) Sam Shewmaker	Decision (split)	5	2:00	Heavyweight Tournament Final, for the vacant BKFC Heavyweight Championship & vacant Police Gazette Heavyweight American Championship. 47-48, 48-46, 48-46.
Light Heavyweight 84 kg	(United States) Marcel Stamps	def.	(United States) Kendall Grove	KO (punches)	3	0:47	
Light Heavyweight 84 kg	(United States) Joe Riggs	def.	(United States) Brok Weaver	Decision (unanimous)	5	2:00	49-46, 49-46, 50-45
Middleweight 75 kg	(United States) Elvin Brito	def.	(United States) Harris Stephenson	KO (punch)	5	0:06	
Women's Featherweight 57 kg	(United States) Christine Ferea	def.	(United States) Jennifer Tate	TKO (punches)	1	1:55	
Lightweight 62.5 kg	(United States) Johnny Bedford	def.	(United States) Matt Murphy	Decision (unanimous)	5	2:00	Lightweight Tournament Quarter-Finals. Judges' scorecards not read.
Lightweight 62.5 kg	(Puerto Rico) Abdiel Velazquez	def.	(United States) Shawn West	KO (punches)	1	1:16	Lightweight Tournament Quarter-Finals
Preliminary Card
Cruiserweight 93 kg	(United States) Mike Bissett	def.	(United States) Aaron Brink	KO (punches)	1	1:21	
Lightweight 62.5 kg	(United States) Rusty Crowder	def.	(United States) Joe Pegg	TKO (punches)	2	0:33	Lightweight Tournament Quarter-Finals
