= Bec Rawlings =

Australian mixed martial artist (born 1988/1989)

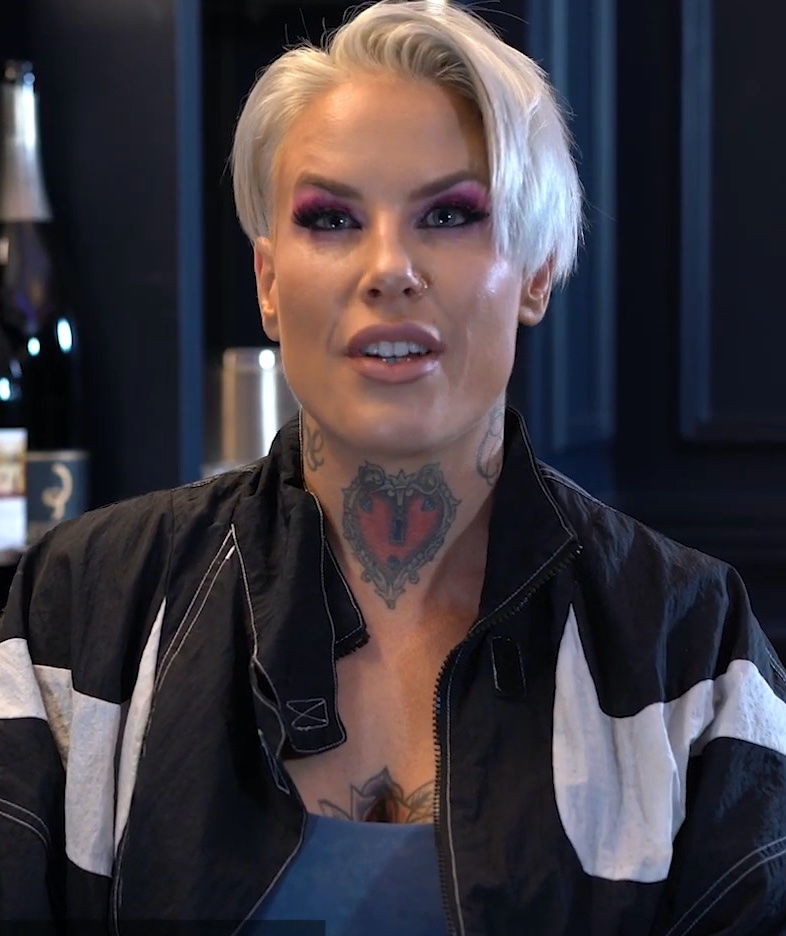
- Rawlings in 2022
- Born: 1988 or 1989 (age 36–37); Launceston, Tasmania, Australia
- Other names: Rowdy
- Height: 5 ft 6 in (1.68 m)
- Weight: 125 lb (57 kg; 8.9 st)
- Division: Strawweight (2012–2016); Flyweight (2017–present)
- Reach: 64 in (163 cm)
- Fighting out of: Brisbane, Queensland, Australia
- Team: Impact MMA (until 2014); Alliance MMA (2014–present); Gamebred Combat Club (present)
- Years active: 2011–present

Professional boxing record
- Total: 1
- Losses: 1

Mixed martial arts record
- Total: 17
- Wins: 8
- By knockout: 1
- By submission: 4
- By decision: 3
- Losses: 9
- By knockout: 2
- By submission: 1
- By decision: 6

Other information
- Boxing record from BoxRec
- Mixed martial arts record from Sherdog

Rebecca "Bec" Rawlings (born 1988 or 1989) is an Australian mixed martial artist and bare-knuckle boxer, who currently competes in the flyweight division. As of 13 April 2026, Rawlings is ranked #3 in the BKFC women's flyweight rankings.

== Background ==
Rawlings was raised in Tasmania, and frequently played sports such as basketball, gymnastics and athletics during her pre-teens. As a teenager, however, Rawlings experienced rapid weight gain and suffered from a lack of motivation before turning to the sport of mixed martial arts as a way to battle her issues in 2010. This is where she met Australian professional MMA fighter Dan Hyatt, and decided that she wanted to become an MMA fighter.

== Mixed martial arts career ==
=== Australian competition ===
Known for her aggressive fighting style, Rawlings began her mixed martial arts journey in Launceston, Tasmania in 2010 before relocating to Brisbane, Australia to further her opportunities and experience in early 2011. Rawlings made her professional MMA debut on 15 October 2011 at BRACE 12 in Hobart, Tasmania. Rawlings fought at bantamweight in her debut against Rhiannon Thompson. In what was declared "fight of the night" by the promotion, Rawlings lost her debut fight by way of a highlight reel head kick knockout.

Bouncing back and publicly rallying within the Australian MMA circuit for more fight opportunities at her suited weight class, Rawlings secured consecutive submission victories over Sarah Morrison (at BRACE 14) and Daniela Marjanovic (at Australian Fighting Championship 3). Two more victories over Rachel Sheridan and Christina Tatnell propelled Rawlings to a four-fight winning streak in 2012. This streak, coupled with a noticeable lack of legitimate Australian opponents for Rawlings, caught North America's Invicta Fighting Championships' attention in late 2012.

=== Invicta Fighting Championships ===
In November 2012, Rawlings signed a three-fight contract with Invicta Fighting Championships to compete in their strawweight division. She was originally scheduled to fight Joanne Calderwood on the undercard of Invicta FC 4: Esparza vs. Gadelha on 5 January 2013, but an injury to Cláudia Gadelha resulted in Rawlings being pushed up to an Invicta FC Strawweight Championship fight in the main event against Carla Esparza. Rawlings lost the fight via unanimous decision.

Her first fight outside of Australia, combined with her personality, gave her a lot of coverage in the Australian media. This led Invicta FC president Shannon Knapp to say that she had never seen anything like it, and at the 2012 Women's Mixed Martial Arts Awards she was voted 2012 Favourite Female Fighter with 265 votes by WMMA fans, 70 more than Ronda Rousey.

Rawlings' next fight within Invicta Fighting Championships was against Jasminka Cive at Invicta FC 5: Penne vs. Waterson on 5 April 2013. She won the fight via submission in the first round.

Rawlings faced Mizuki Inoue at Invicta FC 6: Coenen vs. Cyborg on 13 July 2013. Rawlings lost the fight via unanimous decision.

=== Ultimate Fighting Championship ===
==== The Ultimate Fighter ====
Rawlings' Invicta FC contract was assigned to the UFC on 11 December 2013 after the UFC created a women's strawweight division. The promotion also announced a women's edition of The Ultimate Fighter, which would crown the first UFC women's strawweight champion.

Rawlings was the seventh pick to go to coach Gilbert Melendez. She was initially scheduled to face Justine Kish in the preliminary round, however Kish hurt her knee during practice and was replaced by the previously eliminated Tecia Torres. Rawlings went on to lose the fight in a two-round unanimous decision.

==== After TUF ====
Rawlings' first fight after The Ultimate Fighter was against Heather Jo Clark at The Ultimate Fighter: A Champion Will Be Crowned Finale on 12 December 2014. She lost the fight by unanimous decision.

Rawlings was expected to face Seo Hee Ham on 10 May 2015 at UFC Fight Night 65. However, Ham pulled out of the bout on 10 April and was replaced by Lisa Ellis. Rawlings won the fight via submission in the first round.

Rawling's next fight was expected to be against Joanne Calderwood at UFC Fight Night 72 on 18 July 2015. However, on 11 July. Rawlings pulled out of the fight due to injury and was replaced by promotional newcomer Cortney Casey-Sanchez.

Rawlings next faced Paige VanZant on 27 August 2016 at UFC on Fox 21. She lost the fight via KO in the second round after being dropped by a flying head kick and a flurry of follow up punches.

Rawlings next faced Tecia Torres in a rematch at UFC Fight Night: Bermudez vs. The Korean Zombie on 4 February 2017. At the weigh-ins, Rawlings came in at 117.5 lbs, over the women's strawweight non-title limit of 116 lbs. As a result, Rawlings was fined 20% of her purse, which went to Tecia Torres and the bout proceeded at a catchweight. Rawlings lost the fight by unanimous decision.

===== Move up to flyweight =====
Rawlings was again expected to face Joanne Calderwood in flyweight bout at UFC Fight Night: Werdum vs. Tybura on 19 November 2017. However, Calderwood was pulled out from the card due to undisclosed reason and she was replaced by Jessica-Rose Clark. At the weigh-ins, Clark weighed in at 128 pounds, 2 pounds over the flyweight upper limit of 126 pounds. The bout proceeded at a catchweight and Clark forfeited 20% of her purse. Rawlings lost the fight via split decision.

Rawlings faced Ashlee Evans-Smith on 7 April 2018 at UFC 223. She lost the fight by unanimous decision. After losing four fights in a row, Rawlings was subsequently released from the promotion.

=== Bellator ===
After going 3–0 in bare knuckle boxing, news surfaced that Rawlings had signed a contract with Bellator. She made her promotional debut against Ilara Joanne at Bellator 231 on 25 October 2019. She lost the fight by submission in the second round.

Rawlings faced Elina Kallionidou on 22 February 2020 at Bellator 240. She won the bout via unanimous decision.

On 10 July 2021, it was announced that she was no longer under contract with Bellator.

== Bare-knuckle boxing ==
=== Bare Knuckle Fighting Championship ===
On 9 May 2018, it was reported that Rawlings was released from UFC and set to appear in Bare Knuckle FC event. She faced Alma Garcia at the inaugural event BKFC 1 held on 2 June 2018. Rawlings won the fight after Garcia refused to answer the bell after the second round. Shortly after her victory, the Bare Knuckle Boxing Hall of Fame awarded her the inaugural Police Gazette Women's Featherweight World Championship.

As her first title defense, Rawlings faced Britain Hart at BKFC 2 on 25 August 2018. She won the fight by split decision.

On 2 February 2019 at the BKFC 4 in Cancun, Mexico, Bec Rawlings beat Cecilia Flores by unanimous decision.

=== Second stint in BKFC ===
On 22 July 2021, news surfaced that Rawlings had signed a new contract with the BKFC after going 1–1 in Bellator MMA. She was expected to make her return on 22 October 2021, but this return never came to fruition. Rawlings was then scheduled to face Britain Hart on 13 May 2022 at BKFC Fight Night 8, but the bout was cancelled due to Hart having a medical emergency. The bout was then rescheduled to take place at BKFC 26 on 24 June 2022. Rawlings lost the bout via unanimous decision.

She challenged Christine Ferea for the BKFC Women's Flyweight Championship at BKFC 41 on 29 April 2023 and lost by technical knockout. She lost to Ferea again at BKFC 56 on 2 December 2023 by unanimous decision.

Rawlings faced Taylor Starling on 25 January 2025 at BKFC Knucklemania V. She won the fight by unanimous decision.

Rawlings was scheduled to face Jade Masson-Wong on 19 July 2025 at BKFC 79. However, the event was removed for unknown reasons.

== Professional boxing career ==
Rawlings made her professional boxing debut against Natasha Kurene on 3 December 2022, under Star Power promotion. She lost the bout via unanimous decision.

== Personal life ==
Rawlings was previously married to Dan Hyatt. Rawlings filed for divorce in 2013.

Rawlings has two sons.

As of January 2014 Bec started going by her maiden name (Rawlings) and was in a relationship with fellow Australian mixed martial artist Ben Wall. The two have since separated. As of 2018, Rawlings is in a relationship with Australian professional boxer Adrian Rodriguez.

== Championships and accomplishments ==
=== Bare-knuckle boxing ===
- Bare Knuckle Fighting Championship
  - Police Gazette Women's Featherweight World Championship (one time)
    - Two successful title defenses

== Mixed martial arts record ==
Professional record breakdown
17 matches	8 wins	9 losses
By knockout	1	2
By submission	4	1
By decision	3	6

Res.	Record	Opponent	Method	Event	Date	Round	Time	Location	Notes
Win	8–9	Elina Kallionidou	Decision (unanimous)	Bellator 240	22 February 2020	3	5:00	Dublin, Ireland	
Loss	7–9	Ilara Joanne	Submission (kneebar)	Bellator 231	25 October 2019	2	3:35	Uncasville, Connecticut, United States	
Loss	7–8	Ashlee Evans-Smith	Decision (unanimous)	UFC 223	7 April 2018	3	5:00	Brooklyn, New York, United States	
Loss	7–7	Jessica-Rose Clark	Decision (split)	UFC Fight Night: Werdum vs. Tybura	19 November 2017	3	5:00	Sydney, Australia	Return to Flyweight; Clark missed weight (128 lbs).
Loss	7–6	Tecia Torres	Decision (unanimous)	UFC Fight Night: Bermudez vs. The Korean Zombie	4 February 2017	3	5:00	Houston, Texas, United States	Catchweight (117.5 lbs) bout; Rawlings missed weight.
Loss	7–5	Paige VanZant	KO (switch kick and punches)	UFC on Fox: Maia vs. Condit	27 August 2016	2	0:17	Vancouver, British Columbia, Canada	
Win	7–4	Seo Hee Ham	Decision (unanimous)	UFC Fight Night: Hunt vs. Mir	20 March 2016	3	5:00	Brisbane, Australia	
Win	6–4	Lisa Ellis	Submission (rear-naked choke)	UFC Fight Night: Miocic vs. Hunt	10 May 2015	1	4:09	Adelaide, Australia	
Loss	5–4	Heather Jo Clark	Decision (unanimous)	The Ultimate Fighter: A Champion Will Be Crowned Finale	12 December 2014	3	5:00	Las Vegas, Nevada, United States	
Loss	5–3	Mizuki Inoue	Decision (unanimous)	Invicta FC 6: Coenen vs. Cyborg	13 July 2013	3	5:00	Kansas City, Missouri, United States	
Win	5–2	Jasminka Cive	Submission (armbar)	Invicta FC 5: Penne vs. Waterson	5 April 2013	1	3:30	Kansas City, Missouri, United States	Flyweight bout.
Loss	4–2	Carla Esparza	Decision (unanimous)	Invicta FC 4: Esparza vs. Hyatt	5 January 2013	5	5:00	Kansas City, Missouri, United States	For the inaugural Invicta FC Strawweight Championship.
Win	4–1	Christina Nicole Tatnell	TKO (punches)	Nitro MMA: Nitro 7	20 October 2012	1	0:37	Brisbane, Australia	
Win	3–1	Rachel Sheridan	Decision (majority)	Valor Fight 1: Resolution	9 June 2012	3	3:00	Launceston, Australia	
Win	2–1	Daniela Marjanovic	Technical Submission (rear-naked choke)	Australian Fighting Championship 3	14 April 2012	1	0:21	Melbourne, Australia	
Win	1–1	Sarah Morrison	Submission (armbar)	BRACE 14	18 February 2012	2	1:30	Canberra, Australia	
Loss	0–1	Rhiannon Thompson	KO (head kick)	BRACE 12	5 October 2011	1	2:30	Hobart, Australia	

=== Mixed martial arts exhibition record ===
Exhibition record breakdown		
1 match	0 wins	1 loss
By decision	0	1

Res.	Record	Opponent	Method	Event	Date	Round	Time	Location	Notes
Loss	0–1	Tecia Torres	Decision (unanimous)	The Ultimate Fighter: A Champion Will Be Crowned	12 November 2014 (airdate)	2	5:00	Las Vegas, Nevada, United States	TUF 20 Elimination round

== Bare knuckle record ==
Professional record breakdown
7 matches	4 wins	3 losses
By knockout	1	1
By decision	3	2

Res.	Record	Opponent	Method	Event	Date	Round	Time	Location	Notes
Win	4–3	Taylor Starling	Decision (unanimous)	BKFC Knucklemania V	25 January 2025	5	2:00	Philadelphia, Pennsylvania, United States	
Loss	3–3	Christine Ferea	Decision (unanimous)	BKFC 56	2 December 2023	5	2:00	Salt Lake City, Utah, United States	For the BKFC Women's Flyweight Championship.
Loss	3–2	Christine Ferea	TKO (doctor stoppage)	BKFC 41	29 April 2023	2	2:00	Broomfield, Colorado, United States	For the BKFC Women's Flyweight Championship.
Loss	3–1	Britain Hart	Decision (unanimous)	BKFC 26	24 June 2022	5	2:00	Hollywood, Florida, United States	
Win	3–0	Cecilia Flores	Decision (unanimous)	BKFC 4	2 February 2019	5	2:00	Cancun, Mexico	Defended Police Gazette Women's Featherweight World Championship and won the World Boxing Foundation Latin American championship.
Win	2–0	Britain Hart	Decision (split)	BKFC 2	25 August 2018	5	2:00	Biloxi, Mississippi, United States	Defended the Police Gazette Women's Featherweight World Championship.
Win	1–0	Alma Garcia	TKO (doctor stoppage)	BKFC 1	2 June 2018	2	2:00	Cheyenne, USA	Awarded the inaugural Police Gazette Women's Featherweight World Championship.

== Professional boxing record ==
1 fight	0 wins	1 loss
By decision	0	1

No.	Result	Record	Opponent	Type	Round, time	Date	Location	Notes
1	Loss	0–1	(Australia) Natasha Kurene	UD	5	3 December 2022	The Star Gold Coast, Gold Coast, Queensland, Australia	

== See also ==
- List of female mixed martial artists
