= Moisés Baute =

Spanish kickboxer

- Born: Moisés Baute Curbelo; 29 August 1984 (age 42); Santa Cruz de Tenerife, Islas Canarias, Spain
- Nationality: Spanish
- Height: 1.84 m (6 ft 1/2 in)
- Weight: 95 kg (209 lb; 14 st 13 lb)
- Division: Heavyweight; Super Cruiserweight; Cruiserweight
- Style: Kickboxing
- Stance: Southpaw
- Fighting out of: Tenerife, Spain
- Team: Moises Ruibal Gym

Kickboxing record
- Total: 30
- Wins: 21
- By knockout: 10
- Losses: 9

Other information
- Boxing record from BoxRec

Moisés Baute Curbelo (born 29 August 1984) is a Spanish heavyweight kickboxer. He is the former Enfusion heavyweight champion. Baute previously fought in the SUPERKOMBAT Fighting Championship, where he was two-time championship challenger.

== Kickboxing career ==
Baute fought during Enfusion 7, when he faced Portuguese kickboxer Luis Morais. Baute won the fight by knockout.

In June 2014, Baute participated in the SUPERKOMBAT World Grand Prix III 2014 cruiserweight tournament. In the semi-finals he defeated Cristian Ristea by TKO. In the finals he defeated Michael Terrill by TKO.

He then challenged Andrei Stoica for the SUPERKOMBAT Super Cruiserweight title. Baute lost the fight by TKO.

During Strikers League he fought Nassim Ballhor. Baute won by a second round KO.

He fought once more for Enfusion during Enfusion 81, when he faced against Mathieu Kongolo. Moises won the fight by a second round KO.

In his next Enfusion fight he challenged for the heavyweight title against Mohamed Boubkari. He won the fight in the first round by KO.

His last fight of 2019 was against Bruno Susano for ISKA World title. Baute won a majority decision.

Baute was scheduled to participate in a ONE Championship tournament held at Road to ONE: Strikers Cage Championship 7. He won the tournament with a TKO victory against Christian Brorhilker in the semifinals and a decision victory against David Trallero in the finals.

== Championships and accomplishments ==
- International Sport Karate Association
  - ISKA World Oriental Rules Super Cruiserweight Championship
- Enfusion
  - Enfusion Heavyweight Championship
- SUPERKOMBAT Fighting Championship
  - SUPERKOMBAT World Grand Prix III 2014 Cruiserweight Tournament winner

== Kickboxing record ==
Kickboxing record
21 wins (10 (T)KOs), 9 losses
Date	Result	Opponent	Event	Location	Method	Round	Time
2021-06-26	Win	(Spain) David Trallero	Road to ONE: Strikers Cage Championship 7, Tournament Final	Tenerife, Spain	Decision	3	3:00
2021-06-26	Win	(Spain) Christian Brorhilker	Road to ONE: Strikers Cage Championship 7, Tournament Semifinal	Tenerife, Spain	TKO	2	
2019-11-23	Win	(Portugal) Bruno Susano	ISKA La Tenerife	Tenerife, Spain	Decision (majority)	5	3:00
Wins the ISKA Oriental Rules Super Cruiserweight title.
2019-10-26	Win	(Morocco) Mohamed Boubkari	Enfusion 89	Wuppertal, Germany	Decision (unanimous)	5	3:00
Wins the Enfusion Heavyweight title.
2019-09-21	Win	(Spain) David Trallero	Slam Arena	Gran Canaria, Spain	Decision (unanimous)	3	3:00
2019-03-30	Win	(Belgium) Mathieu Kongolo	Enfusion 81	Wuppertal, Germany	TKO (punches)	2	3:00
2017-05-20	Win	(Belgium) Nassim Balhor	Strikers League	Tenerife, Spain	KO (punch)	2	3:00
2016-05-07	Loss	(Brazil) César Almeida	SUPERKOMBAT World Grand Prix II 2016	Bucharest, Romania	Decision (majority)	5	3:00
For the SUPERKOMBAT Light Heavyweight Plus title.
2015-04-18	Loss	(Morocco) Mohamed Boubkari	Enfusion 27	Tenerife, Spain	TKO (corner stoppage)	2	
2014-10-25	Loss	(Romania) Andrei Stoica	SUPERKOMBAT World Grand Prix 2014 Final Elimination	Geneva, Switzerland	TKO (punches)	3	2:30
For the SUPERKOMBAT Super Cruiserweight title.
2014-06-21	Win	(England) Michael Terrill	SUPERKOMBAT World Grand Prix III 2014, Final	Constanta, Romania	TKO (body punches)	2	
Wins SUPERKOMBAT World Grand Prix III 2014 cruiserweight tournament.
2014-06-21	Win	(Romania) Cristian Ristea	SUPERKOMBAT World Grand Prix III 2014, Semi-finals	Constanta, Romania	TKO (punches)	3	
2014-03-22	Loss	(Belarus) Igor Bugaenko	FCK	Tenerife, Spain	Decision (unanimous)	3	3:00
2013-11-09	Win	(Spain) Animal Souza		Tenerife, Spain	TKO (knees)	1	
2013-07-13	Win	(Portugal) Luis Morais	Enfusion 7	Tenerife, Spain	KO (punch)	1	
2013-04-13	Win	(Spain) Alberto		Tenerife, Spain	KO (left hook)	1	
2011-09-25	Loss	(Belgium) Rustemi Kreshnik	BFN Group & Music Hall presents: It's Showtime "Fast & Furious 70MAX"	Brussels, Belgium	KO (right hook)	2	1:41
Legend: Win Loss Draw/no contest Notes

== See also ==
- List of male kickboxers
