= Britain Hart =

American boxer and bare-knuckle boxer (born 1990)

- Born: February 2, 1990 (age 36); Layton, Utah
- Height: 5 ft 7 in (170 cm)
- Division: Featherweight

Professional boxing record
- Total: 11
- Wins: 4
- By knockout: 3
- Losses: 4
- By knockout: 1
- Draws: 3

Bare-knuckle boxing record
- Total: 13
- Wins: 10
- By knockout: 2
- Losses: 3
- By knockout: 1

Britain Hart (born February 2, 1990) is an American professional boxer and bare-knuckle boxer. She currently competes in the Bare Knuckle Fighting Championship (BKFC) where she is the current and inaugural BKFC Women's Strawweight Champion. As a boxer, she competed in the featherweight division.

== Professional boxing career ==
Hart boxed professionally between 2016 and 2020. Throughout her career, she amassed a record of 4–4–3. Hart fought Alycia Baumgardner, who made her professional debut on March 4, 2017. She lost the fight by a first-round technical knockout.

== Bare-knuckle boxing career ==
=== Bare Knuckle Fighting Championship ===
In her bare-knuckle boxing debut, Hart faced Bec Rawlings for the Police Gazette Women's Featherweight World Championship at BKFC 2 on August 25, 2018. She lost the fight by split decision.

Hart then faced Christine Ferea at BKFC 5 on April 6, 2019. She lost the bout via technical knockout in the second round.

Hart faced Randine Eckholm at BKFC 14 on November 13, 2020. She won her first bout via fourth-round technical knockout.

Hart faced Paige VanZant who made her debut for the promotion on February 5, 2021, in the main event of BKFC Knucklemania in Tampa, Florida. She won the fight via unanimous decision.

Hart faced Jenny Clausius at BKFC 19. She won the bout via third-round TKO.

Hart faced Pearl Gonzalez at BKFC 22 on November 12, 2021. She won the fight via unanimous decision. This fight earned her the Fight of the Night award.

==== Challenging for the Flyweight Championship ====
On February 19, 2022, Hart faced Christine Ferea in a rematch, this time for the inaugural BKFC women's flyweight title at BKFC KnuckleMania 2. She lost the bout by unanimous decision.

Hart was then scheduled to face Bec Rawlings on May 13, 2022, at BKFC Fight Night 8, but the bout was cancelled due to Hart having a medical emergency. The bout was then rescheduled to take place at BKFC 26 on June 24, 2022. Hart won the bout via unanimous decision.

==== BKFC Women's Strawweight Champion ====
Hart faced Charisa Sigala for the inaugural BKFC Women's Strawweight Championship at BKFC 29 on September 10, 2022. She won the bout via unanimous decision, thus becoming the inaugural strawweight champion.

In her first title defense, Hart faced Jenny Clausius at BKFC 39 on March 24, 2023. She won the bout by unanimous decision.

Hart faced Melanie Shah at BKFC 51 on September 30, 2023. She defended her title via unanimous decision.

Hart defended her title against Taylor Starling on August 3, 2024, at BKFC 63. She won the fight by unanimous decision.

Hart defended her title against Tai Emery on April 4, 2025, at BKFC 71 Dubai: Day 1. She won the fight by unanimous decision.

Hart defended her title against Sarah Shell on July 3, 2026 at BKFC Liberty Brawl. She won the fight by split decision.

== Personal life ==
Hart was married to the former BKFC Heavyweight Champion and UFC veteran Joey Beltran.

== Championships and accomplishments ==
=== Bare-knuckle boxing ===
- Bare Knuckle Fighting Championship
  - BKFC Women's Strawweight Championship (one time, current; inaugural)
    - Five successful defenses
  - BKFC Female Fighter of the Year 2022
  - Fight of the Night (One time) vs. Pearl Gonzalez

== Bare knuckle boxing record ==
Professional record breakdown
14 matches	11 wins	3 losses
By knockout	2	0
By decision	9	3

Res.	Record	Opponent	Method	Event	Date	Round	Time	Location	Notes
Win	11–3	Sarah Shell	Decision (split)	BKFC Liberty Brawl	July 3, 2026	5	2:00	Philadelphia, Pennsylvania, United States	Defended the BKFC Women's Strawweight Championship.
Win	10–3	Tai Emery	Decision (unanimous)	BKFC 71 Dubai: Day 1	April 4, 2025	5	2:00	Dubai, United Arab Emirates	Defended the BKFC Women's Strawweight Championship.
Win	9–3	Taylor Starling	Decision (unanimous)	BKFC 63	August 3, 2024	5	2:00	Sturgis, South Dakota, United States	Defended the BKFC Women's Strawweight Championship.
Win	8–3	Melanie Shah	Decision (unanimous)	BKFC 51	September 30, 2023	5	2:00	Salem, Virginia, United States	Defended the BKFC Women's Strawweight Championship.
Win	7–3	Jenny Clausius	Decision (unanimous)	BKFC 39	March 24, 2023	5	2:00	Norfolk, Virginia, United States	Defended the BKFC Women's Strawweight Championship.
Win	6–3	Charisa Sigala	Decision (unanimous)	BKFC 29	September 10, 2022	5	2:00	Great Falls, Montana, United States	Won the inaugural BKFC Women's Strawweight Championship.
Win	5–3	Bec Rawlings	Decision (unanimous)	BKFC 26	June 24, 2022	5	2:00	Hollywood, Florida, United States	
Loss	4–3	Christine Ferea	Decision (unanimous)	BKFC KnuckleMania 2	February 19, 2022	5	2:00	Hollywood, Florida, United States	For the inaugural BKFC Women's Flyweight Championship.
Win	4–2	Pearl Gonzalez	Decision (unanimous)	BKFC 22	November 12, 2021	5	2:00	Miami, Florida, United States	Fight of the Night.
Win	3–2	Jenny Clausius	TKO (referee stoppage)	BKFC 19	July 23, 2021	3	1:55	Tampa, Florida, United States	
Win	2–2	Paige VanZant	Decision (unanimous)	BKFC Knucklemania	February 5, 2021	5	2:00	Miami, Florida, United States	
Win	1–2	Randine Eckholm	TKO (punches)	BKFC 14	November 13, 2020	4	1:21	Miami, Florida, United States	
Loss	0–2	Christine Ferea	TKO (doctor stoppage)	BKFC 5	April 6, 2019	2	1:09	Biloxi, Mississippi, United States	For the vacant Police Gazette Women's Featherweight American Championship.
Loss	0–1	Bec Rawlings	Decision (split)	BKFC 2	August 25, 2018	5	2:00	Biloxi, Mississippi, United States	For the Police Gazette Women's Featherweight World Championship.

== Professional boxing record ==
11 fights	4 wins	4 losses
By knockout	3	1
By decision	1	3
Draws	3	

No.	Result	Record	Opponent	Type	Round, time	Date	Location	Notes
11	Win	4–4–3	(United States) Kim Wabik	RTD	1 (6), 2:00	Aug 15, 2020	(United States) Southpaw Boxing and Fitness, Windham, New Hampshire, U.S.	
10	Loss	3–4–3	(United States) Shurretta Metcalf	SD	4	Feb 28, 2020	(United States) Southern Junction Nightclub, Irving, Texas, U.S.	
9	Draw	3–3–3	(United States) Unique Harris	SD	4	Dec 14, 2019	(United States) Zembo Shrine Building, Harrisburg, Pennsylvania, U.S.	
8	Draw	3–3–2	(United States) Jamie Mitchell	MD	6	Aug 02, 2019	(United States) Thomas & Mack Center, Las Vegas, Nevada, U.S.	
7	Win	3–3–1	(United Kingdom) Carley Batey	MD	4	May 25, 2019	(United States) Extravaganza, Charlotte, North Carolina, U.S.	
6	Draw	2–3–1	(United States) Kim Wabik	SD	4	Jan 25, 2019	(United States) Castleton Banquet & Conference Center, Windham, New Hampshire, U.S.	
5	Loss	2–3	(United States) Sacred Downing	UD	4	Jun 02, 2018	(United States) Boardwalk Hall, Atlantic City, New Jersey, U.S.	
4	Loss	2–2	(United States) Alycia Baumgardner	TKO	1 (4), 2:38	Mar 04, 2017	(United States) Hollywood Casino Columbus, Columbus, Ohio, U.S.	
3	Loss	2–1	(Germany) Ikram Kerwat	UD	4	Feb 17, 2017	(United States) Chase Center on the Riverfront, Wilmington, Delaware, U.S.	
2	Win	2–0	(United States) Khadija Sanders	KO	1 (4), 1:21	Nov 19, 2016	(United States) Charles Walker Recreation Center, Danville, Virginia, U.S.	
1	Win	1–0	(United States) Crystal Sutton	TKO	2 (4), 1:04	Oct 19, 2016	(United States) Grady Cole Center, Charlotte, North Carolina, U.S.	
