= Jasminka Cive =

Austrian mixed martial artist

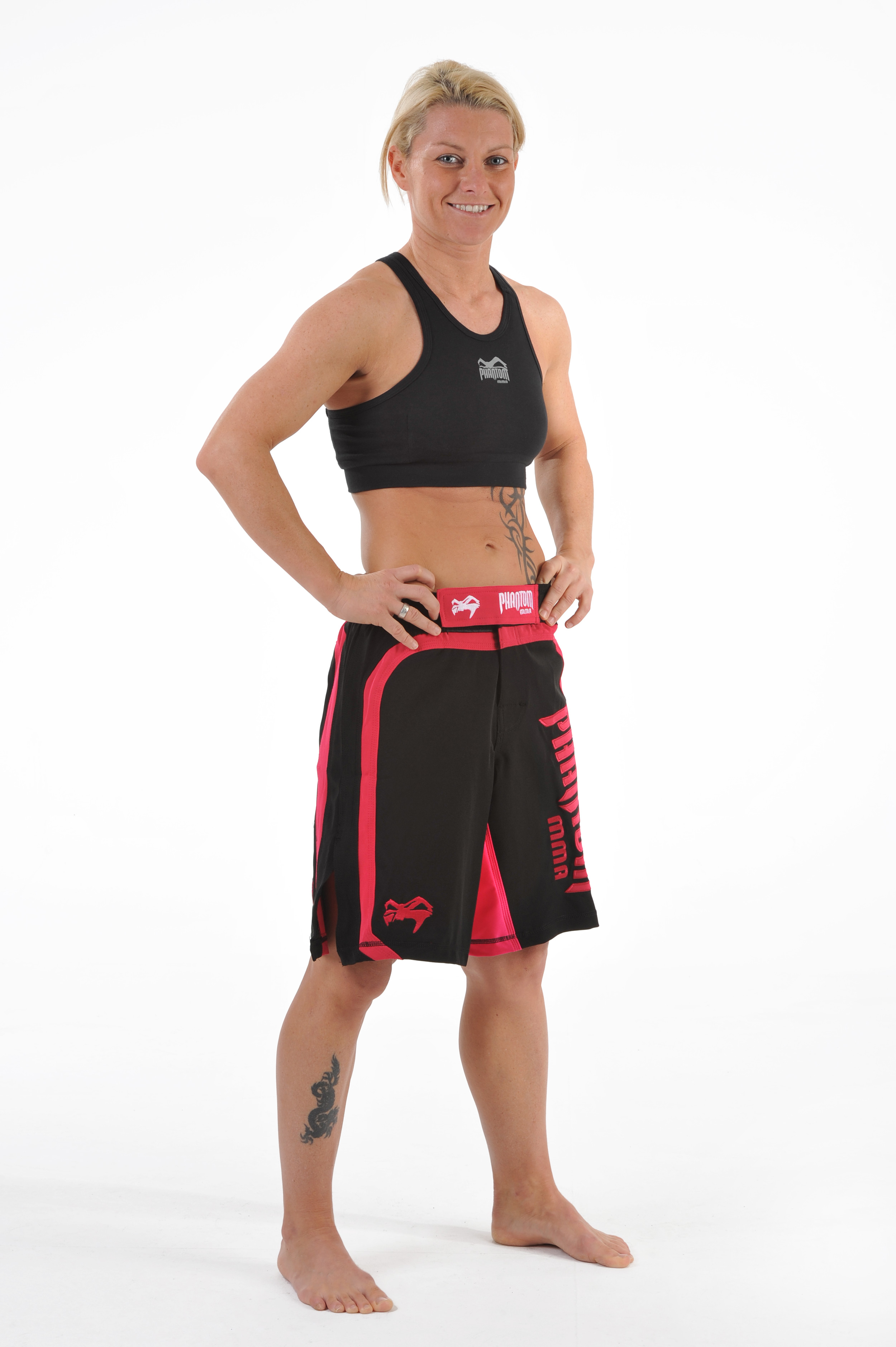
- Jasminka Cive
- Born: Jasminka Dizdarević; July 24, 1981 (age 45); Belgrade, SR Serbia, SFR Yugoslavia
- Other names: Impressive
- Nationality: Austrian
- Height: 5 ft 6 in (1.68 m)
- Weight: 115 lb (52 kg; 8.2 st)
- Division: Strawweight
- Reach: 70.0 in (178 cm)
- Style: Boxing, Muay Thai
- Stance: Southpaw

Mixed martial arts record
- Total: 7
- Wins: 5
- By knockout: 4
- By submission: 1
- Losses: 2
- By submission: 2

Other information
- Mixed martial arts record from Sherdog

Jasminka Cive (born July 24, 1981) is an Austrian female kickboxer and mixed martial artist, based in Austria. She competes professionally since 2005 and is the current ISKA Flyweight champion and mixed martial artist.

== Biography ==
Born in Serbia, Jasminka Cive moved to Austria with her family at the age of 12. Already at age ten, she began training in Karate in her home. In Austria, she added kickboxing, Muay Thai and eventually added MMA to her sporting activities. In addition to being active in the sport she is also promoting martial arts events under the name "Mixfight Night" as well as fight Judge operate.

She is currently studying sports science. In May 2013 Jasminka Cive opened her own martial arts school named "Happy Fight" in Enns. She organized MMA seminars in German-speaking countries together with the German fighter Sheila Gaff. In December 2014, she survived a life-threatening blood infection.

== Sporting career ==
=== Muay Thai and K-1 ===
In 1998, at the age of 16 years Jasminka Cive started with K - 1 and Muay Thai . After a series of battles against known opponents in different weight classes and countries injuries forced her into a competition break of four years . After 4 operations Cive felt in 2007 that she was again ready for fighting, although it was recommended by a doctor page. Beating, she was " International Austrian Champion " in the K - 1 of the ISKA. In 2009, denied a boxing match against a male opponent, she won on points . Your opponent had to spend with a concussion in the hospital the following night . The title " Austrian Champion Full Muay Thai Rules" in the super flyweight of ISKA took Cive in 2010. until the change to MMA, the end of 2010, she denied numerous other battles . Their fight record in Muay Thai and K - 1 is at 17 wins, 6 losses and 1 draw .

=== Mixed martial arts ===
Jasminka Cive is one of the internationally best-known European MMA athletes and is, next to Sheila Gaff most successful in Germany. In all their struggles she was unbeaten between 2003 and 5 April-2013. Thereby the Austrian media were aware of them. The Austrian Broadcasting Corporation (ORF) dedicated her in 2012, a 30-minute report and also the private channel LT1 they presented in an article. At first she was training less than two years at the Ettl Bros. in Graz.

Already on 8 May 2010 denied Cive her first professional fight in Vienna against the Ukrainian Olga Denisenko. In Round 1 the fight for a submission hold (Arm-Triangle Choke) in favor of Jasminka Cive was over. When Grazer Cage Fight Series, one of the biggest MMA events in Europe it was up against the Germans Danny Rapf. This battle was incorporated into a 50-minute report of the Austrian TV station ATV on the life of Jasminka. The following three fights were all won by knockout or by Cive TKO. In Vaduz, Liechtenstein took place the battle for the world title in women's MMA MAX FC Union 17 March 2012. Through a TKO win in the third round against the Slovak Eva Henesova to Jasminka Cive also secures this item.

== Titles ==
- 2010 – Max-FC Title, Kingdom Lichtenstein
- 2010 – ISKA / International Sport Kickboxing Association, Super-flyweight Champion (-53,5 kg) (Full Rules)
- 2007 – ISKA / International Sport Kickboxing Association, Super-flyweight Champion (-53,5 kg)

== Mixed martial arts record ==
Professional record breakdown
7 matches	5 wins	2 losses
By knockout	4	0
By submission	1	2
By decision	0	0

Res.	Record	Opponent	Method	Event	Date	Round	Time	Location	Notes
Loss	5–2	Karolina Kowalkiewicz	Submission (Armbar)	KSW 22: Pride Time	May 17, 2014	1	3:53	Gdańsk, Poland	
Loss	5–1	Bec Rawlings	Submission (Armbar)	Invicta FC 5	April 5, 2013	1	3:30	Kansas City, United States	
Win	5–0	Eva Henesova	TKO (Punches)	MAX FC 6 - Martial Arts Xtreme Fight Championship 6	March 17, 2012	3	2:10	Vaduz, Liechtenstein	
Win	4–0	Lilla Vincze	TKO (Punches)	FS 6 - Weinpolter vs. Guelmino	November 20, 2011	2	2:44	Graz, Austria	
Win	3–0	Lilla Vincze	KO (Punch)	FOTN - Fight of the Night 2011	May 27, 2011	2		Bavaria, Germany	
Win	2–0	Aniko Levi	TKO (Knees and Punches)	FOTN - Fight of the Night 2010	October 30, 2010	2	3:00	Kitzbuhel, Austria	
Win	1–0	Olga Denisenko	Submission (Arm-Triangle Choke)	Ultimate Cage Fighters 3 - Austria vs. Serbia	May 8, 2010	1		Vienna, Austria	

== See also ==
- List of female mixed martial artists
- List of female kickboxers
