= Mick Terrill =

English kickboxer and bare-knuckle boxer

- Born: Michael Gordon John Terrill; 17 June 1983 (age 43); Tyne and Wear, England
- Nationality: British
- Height: 6 ft 3 in (1.91 m)
- Weight: 265 lb (120 kg; 18.9 st)
- Division: Heavyweight
- Stance: Orthodox
- Fighting out of: North Shields, Tyne and Wear, England
- Years active: 2016-present (Bare-knuckle boxing)

Bare-knuckle boxing record
- Total: 13
- Wins: 11
- By knockout: 10
- Losses: 2
- By knockout: 2

Michael Gordon John Terrill (born 17 June 1983) is an English kickboxer and bare-knuckle boxer. As a bare-knuckle boxer, he currently competes in the BKB Bare Knuckle Boxing, where he was a former 2-time defending champion, and was the former BKFC UK Heavyweight Champion and former BKFC Heavyweight World Champion. As a kickboxer, he has fought in the SUPERKOMBAT Fighting Championship. As of May 28, 2026, he is #2 in the BKB heavyweight rankings.

== Kickboxing career ==
In June 2014, Terrill participated in the SUPERKOMBAT World Grand Prix III 2014 cruiserweight tournament. In the semi-finals he defeated Patrick van Rees by unanimous decision, but in the finals he lost to Moisés Baute by TKO.

== Bare-knuckle boxing career ==
=== Knuckle ===
Terrill faced ‘cowboys’ Michael Quinn McDonaugh in a cruiserweight world title on September 24, 2016 in Newcastle, Terrill won the bout via unanimous decision becoming World Knuckle cruiserweight championship

=== BKB ===
In his BKB debut, Terrill faced Karl Cook at BKB 3 on December 17, 2016 Hartlepool. He won the bout via first-round knockout.

Terrill then faced Danny Batchelder on January 14, 2017 at Coventry. He won the bout by third-round technical knockout

==== Heavyweight champion ====
Terrill then faced John Lewis on April 22, 2017 at Birmingham for the BKB World Heavyweight title. He won the bout by second-round knockout becoming BKB Heavyweight champion.

Terrill defended his Heavyweight title against Hari Miles on September 9, 2017 at Liverpool. Terrill won via third-round Technical knockout, defending his BKB Heavyweight world title

Terrill then defended his Heavyweight title against Josh Burns on January 13, 2018 at London. Terrill won via fourth-round technical knockout, defending his BKB Heavyweight world title.

=== Bare Knuckle Fighting Championship ===
In his BKFC debut, Terrill faced Arnold Adams at BKFC 19 on July 23, 2021. He lost the bout via third-round knockout.

Terrill then faced Sam Shewmaker on August 20, 2022, at BKFC 27. He won the bout by first-round technical knockout.

In the heavyweight title eliminator match, Terrill faced Steve Banks on 26 November 2022, at the main event of BKFC Fight Night 11. He won the bout by second-round TKO via doctor stoppage.

==== Heavyweight champion ====
Terrill faced Arnold Adams in a rematch for the vacant BKFC Heavyweight Championship on December 2, 2023, at BKFC 56. He won the bout by fourth-round knockout, thus winning the title. This fight earned him the Knockout of the Night award.

Terrill defended his championship against BKFC Cruiserweight World Champion and BKFC Light heavyweight World Champion Lorenzo Hunt at BKFC Knucklemania IV in Los Angeles on April 27, 2024. Terrill won the bout by technical knockout after knocking Hunt down with an uppercut which led Hunt to fall and injure his elbow.

Terrill faced Ben Rothwell on January 25, 2025 at BKFC Knucklemania V. Terrill lost the championship by knockout in the first round.

Terrill faced Jay McFarlane on March 15, 2026 in the main event at BKFC Fight Night 34. He won the fight by technical knockout in the first round.

== Personal life ==
Terrill lives in North Shields, England and was married to Karmen Terrill until her death in October 2026. He is a father of three children.

== Championships and accomplishments ==
=== Bare-knuckle boxing ===
- Bare Knuckle Fighting Championship
  - BKFC Heavyweight World Champion (One time)
    - One successful defense
  - Knockout of the Night (One time) vs. Arnold Adams
- Bare Knuckle Boxing
  - BKB World Heavyweight Championship (One time)
    - Two successful defenses
- Knuckle Promotion
  - Knuckle Promotion World Cruiserweight Championship (One time)

== Bare knuckle record ==
Professional record breakdown
13 matches	11 wins	2 losses
By knockout	10	2
By decision	1	0

Res.	Record	Opponent	Method	Event	Date	Round	Time	Location	Notes
Win	11–2	Jay McFarlane	TKO (punches)	BKFC Fight Night Newcastle: Terrill vs. McFarlane	March 14, 2026	1	0:53	Newcastle upon Tyne, England	Won the inaugural BKFC UK Heavyweight Championship.
Loss	10–2	Ben Rothwell	KO (punch)	BKFC Knucklemania V	January 25, 2025	1	0:36	Philadelphia, Pennsylvania, United States	Lost the BKFC Heavyweight Championship.
Win	10–1	Lorenzo Hunt	TKO (injury)	BKFC Knucklemania IV	April 27, 2024	1	1:48	Los Angeles, California, United States	Defended the BKFC Heavyweight Championship.
Win	9–1	Arnold Adams	KO (punches)	BKFC 56	December 2, 2023	4	0:47	Salt Lake City, Utah, United States	Won the vacant BKFC Heavyweight Championship. Knockout of the Night.
Win	8–1	Steve Banks	TKO	BKFC Fight Night Newcastle: Terrill vs. Banks	November 26, 2022	2	2:00	Newcastle upon Tyne, England	BKFC Heavyweight title eliminator.
Win	7–1	Sam Shewmaker	KO	BKFC 27	August 20, 2022	1	1:59	London, England, United Kingdom	
Loss	6–1	Arnold Adams	KO (punch)	BKFC 19	July 23, 2021	3	0:38	Tampa, Florida, United States	
Win	6–0	Josh Burns	TKO	BKB 9: Terrill vs. Burns	January 13, 2018	4	0:39	London, England	Retained BKB World Heavyweight championship
Win	5–0	Hari Miles	TKO (corner stoppage)	BKB 7: Sweeney vs. Guillard 2	September 9, 2017	3	1:24	Liverpool, England	Retained BKB World Heavyweight championship
Win	4–0	John Lewis	TKO	BKB 5: Sweeney vs. Carter	April 22, 2017	2	1:34	Coventry, England	Won the vacant BKB World Heavyweight championship
Win	3–0	Dan Batchelder	TKO	BKB 4: Sweeney vs. McKenzie	January 14, 2017	3	1:42	Coventry, England	
win	2–0	Karl Cook	KO	BKB 3: Sweeny vs. Henry-Welsh	December 17, 2016	1	1:07	Hartlepool, England	
win	1–0	Michael Quinn McDonagh	Decision	Knuckle: Quinn McDonagh vs. Terrill	September 24, 2016	5	2:00	Newcastle, England	Won Knuckle Promotion World Heavyweight championship
