= 2023 in Bare Knuckle Fighting Championship =

Information
- First date: January 27, 2023
- Last date: December 2, 2023

Events
- Total events: 24

Fights
- Total fights: 270
- Title fights: 22

Chronology
2022 in BKFC	2023 in Bare Knuckle Fighting Championship	2024 in BKFC

The year 2023 was the sixth year in the history of the Bare Knuckle Fighting Championship, a bare-knuckle fighting promotion based in Philadelphia.

== Background ==
The 2023 season started with Bare Knuckle Fighting Championship 35 on January 27, 2023. BKFC is available on FITE TV PPV.

== List of events ==
#	Event	Date	Venue	Location
1	BKFC 35 Myrtle Beach: Cedeno vs. Slaveski	January 27, 2023	John T. Rhodes Sports Center	(United States) Myrtle Beach, South Carolina, USA
2	BKFC KnuckleMania 3	February 17, 2023	Tingley Coliseum	(United States) Albuquerque, New Mexico, USA
3	BKFC 36 New Orleans: Adams vs. Belcher	February 24, 2023	Pontchartrain Center	(United States) Kenner, Louisiana, USA
4	BKFC 37 London: Tierney vs. Lindsey	March 4, 2023	Crystal Palace National Sports Centre	London, England, U.K.
–	BKFC 38: Buakaw vs. Saenchai (cancelled)	–	–	–
5	BKFC 39 Norfolk: Barnett vs. Alvarez	March 24, 2023	Norfolk Scope	(United States) Norfolk, Virginia, USA
6	BKFC 38 Delray Beach: Nguyen vs. Straus	April 21, 2023	Delray Beach Tennis Center	(United States) Delray Beach, Florida USA
7	BKFC 40 Leeds: Holmes vs. Christie	April 22, 2023	Planet Ice Leeds	Leeds, England
8	BKFC 41 Colorado: Perry vs. Rockhold	April 29, 2023	1stBank Center	(United States) Denver, Colorado, USA
9	BKFC 42 Greenville: Soto vs. Goodjohn	May 12, 2023	Bon Secours Wellness Arena	(United States) Greenville, South Carolina, USA
10	BKFC 43 Omaha: Alexander vs. Smith	May 19, 2023	Liberty First Credit Union Arena	(United States) Omaha, Nebraska, USA
11	BKFC 44 Montana: Stewart vs. Lopez	June 9, 2023	Four Seasons Arena	(United States) Great Falls, Montana, USA
12	BKFC 45 Hollywood, FL: Palomino vs. Lilley	June 23, 2023	Seminole Hard Rock Hotel & Casino Hollywood	(United States) Hollywood, Florida, USA
13	BKFC 46 Newcastle: Franco vs. Harris	July 1, 2023	Walker Activity Dome	Newcastle, United Kingdom
14	BKFC 47 Lakeland: Mundell vs. Richman	July 14, 2023	Jenkins Arena	(United States) Lakeland, Florida, USA
15	BKFC 48 Albuquerque: Dodson vs. Ridge	August 11, 2023	Tingley Coliseum	(United States) Albuquerque, New Mexico, USA
	BKFC Prospects Series 1	August 24, 2023	Miami-Dade Fairgrounds	(United States) Miami, Florida, USA
16	BKFC 49 Miami: Slaveski vs. Lindsey	August 25, 2023	Miami-Dade Fairgrounds	(United States) Miami, Florida, USA
17	BKFC 50 Denver: Hunt vs. Camozzi	September 22, 2023	1stBank Center	(United States) Denver, Colorado, USA
18	BKFC 51 Salem: Hart vs. Shah	September 29, 2023	Salem Civic Center	(United States) Salem, Virginia, USA
	BKFC Prospects Series 2	October 14, 2023	Liverpool Olympia	(United Kingdom) Liverpool, England
19	BKFC 52 South Carolina: Barnett vs. Richardson	October 20, 2023	Colonial Life Arena	(United States) Columbia, South Carolina, USA
20	BKFC 53 Orlando: Mundell vs. Coltrane	November 3, 2023	Orange County Convention Center	(United States) Orlando, Florida, USA
21	BKFC Thailand 5: Legends of Siam	November 4, 2023	Royal Cliff Hotels Group	Pattaya, Thailand
22	BKFC 54 Bulgaria: Dimitrov vs. Zhelyakov	November 17, 2023	Arena Sofia	Sofia, Bulgaria
23	BKFC 55 Leeds: Christie vs. Warren	November 18, 2023	Planet Ice Leeds	Leeds, England
24	BKFC 56 Utah: Perry vs. Alvarez	December 2, 2023	Maverik Center	(United States) Salt Lake City, Utah, USA

== BKFC 35 Myrtle Beach: Cedeno vs. Slaveski ==
BKFC 35 Myrtle Beach: Cedeno vs. Slaveski
- Promotion: Bare Knuckle Fighting Championship
- Date: January 27, 2023
- Venue: John T. Rhodes Sports Center
- City: (United States) Myrtle Beach, South Carolina

BKFC 35 Myrtle Beach: Cedeno vs. Slaveski was a bare-knuckle fighting event held by Bare Knuckle Fighting Championship on January 27, 2023, at the John T. Rhodes Sports Center in Myrtle Beach, South Carolina, USA.

=== Background ===
The event featured a welterweight title eliminator bout between Yosdenis Cedeno and Gorjan Slaveski.

The event was expected to have a rematch between BKFC Bantamweight Champion Johnny Bedford and former champion Dat Nguyen; however, the bout was cancelled after Bedford retired from combat sports just a few days into the camp.

=== Results ===
BKFC 35 Myrtle Beach: Cedeno vs. Slaveski
Weight Class				Method	Round	Time	Notes
Welterweight 75 kg	(North Macedonia) Gorjan Slaveski	def.	(Cuba) Yosdenis Cedeno	TKO (punches)	4	1:53	BKFC Welterweight Championship title eliminator.
Bantamweight 61 kg	(United States) Keith Richardson	def.	(United States) Justin Scoggins	Decision (unanimous)	5	2:00	48-47, 48–47, 48–47
W. Strawweight 52 kg	(United States) Andy Nguyen	def.	(Russia) Nekah Dmitryeva	Decision (split)	5	2:00	46-49, 49–46, 49–46
Lightweight 70 kg	(United States) Brandon Bushaw	def.	(United States) Paul Teague	KO	1	1:02	
Featherweight 66 kg	(United States) Robert Armas	def.	(United States) Jakobi Lowery	KO	1	1:10	
Welterweight 75 kg	(Turkey) Murat Kazgan	def.	(United States) Jordan Weeks	TKO (doctor stoppage)	1	1:41	
Lightweight 70 kg	(United States) Tony Soto	def.	(United States) Wanya Reid	TKO (doctor stoppage)	4	0:31	
Flyweight 57 kg	(United States) Albert Inclan	def.	(Canada) Devin Gibson	Decision (unanimous)	5	2:00	50-44, 49–45, 48–46
Light Heavyweight	(United States) Willie Sears	def.	(United States) Tomar Washington	DQ (illegal grounded punch)	2	0:57	
Featherweight 66 kg	(United States) Trevor Loken	def.	(United States) Marcus Brimage	TKO (punches)	1	0:40	
Preliminary Card
Featherweight 66 kg	(United States) James Brown	def.	(United States) Stevo Morris	Decision (unanimous)	5	2:00	49-46, 48–46, 49–46
Middleweight 79 kg	(United States) Doug Coltrane	def.	(United States) Brian Jackson	KO	2	0:53	

== BKFC KnuckleMania 3 ==
BKFC KnuckleMania 3
- Promotion: Bare Knuckle Fighting Championship
- Date: February 17, 2023
- Venue: Tingley Coliseum
- City: (United States) Albuquerque, New Mexico

BKFC KnuckleMania 3 was a bare-knuckle fighting event held by Bare Knuckle Fighting Championship on February 17, 2023, at the Tingley Coliseum in Albuquerque, New Mexico, USA.

=== Background ===
The event was headlined by the BKFC Light Heavyweight Championship unification bout between the reigning champion Lorenzo Hunt and the interim champion Mike Richman

The event also featured the bare-knuckle debut of former WBA (Regular) Light Middleweight champion Austin Trout as he faced UFC Hall of Famer Diego Sanchez.

Also, former NFL defensive end and mixed martial artist Greg Hardy made his bare-knuckle debut on the card against Josh Watson. Additionally, the Albuquerque native, The Ultimate Fighter 14 winner and two-time UFC title challenger John Dodson and his brother Eric appeared on the card.

=== Results ===
BKFC KnuckleMania 3
Weight Class				Method	Round	Time	Notes
Light Heavyweight 84 kg	(United States) Lorenzo Hunt (c)	def.	(United States) Mike Richman (ic)	KO (punch)	1	1:50	For the BKFC Light Heavyweight Championship.
Welterweight 75 kg	(United States) Austin Trout	def.	(United States) Diego Sanchez	TKO (doctor stoppage)	4	1:44	
Flyweight 57 kg	(United States) John Dodson	def.	(United States) Jarod Grant	KO (punches)	1	1:41	
Heavyweight 120 kg	(United States) Josh Watson	def.	(United States) Greg Hardy	KO (punch)	2	0:19	
W. Strawweight 52 kg	(United States) Jayme Hinshaw	def.	(United States) Charisa Sigala	TKO (leg injury)	1	0:38	
Middleweight 79 kg	(United States) Will Santiago	def.	(United States) Noah Cutter	TKO (doctor stoppage)	1	2:00	
Lightweight 70 kg	(Uruguay) Gaston Reyno	def.	(United States) Daniel Van Sickle	TKO (doctor stoppage)	1	1:26	
Middleweight 79 kg	(United States) Joshua Moreno	def.	(United States) Christian Torres	TKO (uppercut)	2	1:02	
Lightweight 70 kg	(United States) Kevin Croom	def.	(United States) Chevvy Bridges	KO (punches)	1	1:11	
Preliminary Card
Featherweight 66 kg	(United States) Eric Dodson	def.	(United States) Gene Perez	KO	1	1:32	
Bantamweight 61 kg	(United States) Nick Gonzalez	def.	(United States) Lardy Navarro	KO	1	0:41	
Bantamweight 61 kg	(United States) Derek Perez	def.	(United States) Anthony Sanchez	Decision (unanimous)	5	2:00	49-45, 49–45, 50–44

== BKFC 36 New Orleans: Adams vs. Belcher ==
BKFC 36 New Orleans: Adams vs. Belcher
- Promotion: Bare Knuckle Fighting Championship
- Date: February 24, 2023
- Venue: Pontchartrain Center
- City: (United States) Kenner, Louisiana

BKFC 36 New Orleans: Adams vs. Belcher was a bare-knuckle fighting event held by Bare Knuckle Fighting Championship on February 24, 2023, at the Pontchartrain Center in Kenner, Louisiana, USA.

=== Background ===
The event was headlined by the heavyweight contender Alan Belcher challenging the reigning champion Arnold Adams.

=== Results ===
BKFC 36 New Orleans: Adams vs. Belcher
Weight Class				Method	Round	Time	Notes
Heavyweight 120 kg	(United States) Alan Belcher	def.	(United States) Arnold Adams (c)	KO (punch)	3	0:55	For the BKFC Heavyweight Championship.
Lightweight 70 kg	(Wales) James Lilley	def.	(United States) Bobby Taylor	TKO (doctor stoppage)	3	2:00	
Catchweight 77 kg	(United States) Kaleb Harris	def.	(United States) Brad Kelly	KO	1	0:39	
Middleweight 79 kg	(United States) Duke Sensley	def.	(United States) Joseph Creer	Decision (unanimous)	5	2:00	50-45, 48–47, 48–47
Light Heavyweight 84 kg	(United States) Dennis LaBruzza	def.	(United States) Stephon Reese	KO	2	1:24	
Middleweight 79 kg	(United States) Tony Jenkins	def.	(United States) Dillion Winemiller	TKO (referee stoppage)	3	1:25	
Lightweight 70 kg	(United States) Bryce Henry	def.	(United States) Brandon Shavers	KO	4	1:53	
Featherweight 66 kg	(United States) Andrew Angelcor	vs.	(United States) David Bosnick	Draw (unanimous)	5	2:00	47-47, 47-47, 47-47
Preliminary Card
Featherweight 66 kg	(United States) Tyler Sammis	def.	(United States) Cody Schieve	KO	1	1:32	
Light Heavyweight 84 kg	(United States) Blake LaCaze	def.	(United States) Joseph Brett Williams	TKO (corner stoppage)	3	2:00	
Featherweight 66 kg	(United States) Brandon Meneses	vs.	(United States) Cody Mitchell	Draw (majority)	5	2:00	48-46, 47-47, 47-47
Middleweight 79 kg	(United States) Michael Manno	def.	(United States) Frankie Shughart	KO	1	0:25	

== BKFC 37 London: Tierney vs. Lindsey ==
BKFC 37 London: Tierney vs. Lindsey
- Promotion: Bare Knuckle Fighting Championship
- Date: March 4, 2023
- Venue: Crystal Palace National Sports Centre
- City: (England) London

BKFC 37 London: Tierney vs. Lindsey (also known as BKFC UK 2) was a bare-knuckle fighting event held by Bare Knuckle Fighting Championship on March 4, 2023, at the Crystal Palace National Sports Centre in London, England.

=== Background ===
The event was headlined by a bout between Connor Tierney and Jake Lindsey.

=== Results ===
BKFC 37 London: Tierney vs. Lindsey
Weight Class				Method	Round	Time	Notes
Welterweight 75 kg	(United States) Jake Lindsey	def.	(United Kingdom) Connor Tierney	KO	5	1:02	
Light Heavyweight 84 kg	(England) Rico Franco	vs.	(United Kingdom) Darren Godfrey	KO	2	0:49	
Light Heavyweight 84 kg	(Wales) David Round	def.	(England) Terry Brazier	KO	3	1:28	
Cruiserweight 95 kg	(United Kingdom) Mason Shaw	def.	(United Kingdom) Lee Browne	Decision (unanimous)	5	2:00	50-45, 49–46, 49–46
Cruiserweight 95 kg	(United Kingdom) Darren Hendry	def.	(United Kingdom) Corey Harrison	TKO	2	0:58	
Light Heavyweight 84 kg	(South Africa) Chaz Wasserman	def.	(France) Cedric Severac	Decision (unanimous)	5	2:00	47-44, 47–44, 47–44
Heavyweight 120 kg	(England) Robbie Kennedy	def.	(United Kingdom) Jack Draper	KO	2	1:35	
Welterweight 75 kg	(United Kingdom) Nathan Hind	def.	(United Kingdom) Gary Fox	Decision (unanimous)	5	2:00	50-44, 50–44, 48–46
Welterweight 75 kg	(United Kingdom) Ben Bonnar	def.	(England) Jamie Oldfield	KO	3	1:16	
Preliminary Card
Lightweight 70 kg	(United Kingdom) Ryan Carmichael	def.	(England) Will Cairns	KO	3	0:35	
Light Heavyweight 84 kg	(United Kingdom) Jimmy Millar	def.	(Scotland) Kyle Cassidy	TKO	2	2:00	
Middleweight 79 kg	(United Kingdom) George Thorpe	def.	(United Kingdom) Jamie Hendry	TKO	3	0:54	

== BKFC 38: Buakaw vs. Saenchai (cancelled) ==
BKFC 38: Buakaw vs. Saenchai
- Promotion: Bare Knuckle Fighting Championship
- Date: TBA
- Venue: TBA
- City: TBA

BKFC 38: Buakaw vs. Saenchai was scheduled to be a bare-knuckle fighting event held by Bare Knuckle Fighting Championship on March 18, 2023.

=== Background ===
The event was scheduled to be headlined by a special rules bare-knuckle Muay Thai bout between Muay Thai legends Buakaw Banchamek and Saenchai. However, In mid-February it was announced that due to legal implications regarding the use of name muay thai in marketing, the bout was indefinitely postponed. Being the only published bout, the event was removed from the organization's event schedule altogether.

=== Results ===
BKFC 38: Buakaw vs. Saenchai
Weight Class				Method	Round	Time	Notes
	(Thailand) Buakaw Banchamek	vs.	(Thailand) Saenchai				Muay Thai rules.

== BKFC 39 Norfolk: Barnett vs. Alvarez ==
BKFC 39 Norfolk: Barnett vs. Alvarez
- Promotion: Bare Knuckle Fighting Championship
- Date: March 24, 2023
- Venue: Norfolk Scope
- City: (United States) Norfolk, Virginia

BKFC 39 Norfolk: Barnett vs. Alvarez was a bare-knuckle fighting event held by Bare Knuckle Fighting Championship on March 24, 2023.

=== Background ===
The event was initially scheduled to be headlined by the BKFC Bantamweight Championship bout between Reggie Barnett Jr. and Gustaf Cedermalm. However, Cedermalm withdrew from the bout and was replaced by Daniel Alvarez.

=== Results ===
BKFC 39 Norfolk: Barnett vs. Alvarez
Weight Class				Method	Round	Time	Notes
Bantamweight 61 kg	(United States) Reggie Barnett Jr. (c)	def.	(United States) Daniel Alvarez	TKO (doctor stoppage)	3	2:00	For the BKFC Bantamweight Championship.
W.Strawweight 52 kg	(United States) Britain Hart (c)	def.	(United States) Jenny Clausius	Decision (unanimous)	5	2:00	For the BKFC Women's Strawweight Championship. 50-44, 50-44, 49-45.
Catchweight 73 kg	(United States) Will Worley	def.	(United States) Dimitri Angelini	KO	1	1:10	
Featherweight 66 kg	(United States) Ka'Sim Ruffin	def.	(United States) Trai Santos	KO (punches)	4	1:47	
Light Heavyweight 84 kg	(United States) Jay Jackson	def.	(United States) David Simpson	TKO (doctor stoppage)	2	1:32	
Middleweight 79 kg	(Moldova) Stanislav Grosu	def.	(United States) Quartus Stitt	KO	2	1:59	
Light Heavyweight 84 kg	(United States) Kyle Wright	def.	(United States) Pat Casey	KO (punches)	3	1:18	
Preliminary Card
Heavyweight 120 kg	(United States) Zachary Calmus	def.	(United States) Mikey Furnier	KO (punches)	2	0:49	
Featherweight 66 kg	(United States) Anthony Foye	def.	(United States) Cody Jenkins	Decision (unanimous)	5	2:00	49-46, 49–46, 49–46
Light Heavyweight 84 kg	(United States) Brian Maxwell	def.	(United States) Dan Bunyan	TKO (doctor stoppage)	1	0:59	

== BKFC 38 Delray Beach: Nguyen vs. Straus ==
BKFC 38 Delray Beach: Nguyen vs. Straus
- Promotion: Bare Knuckle Fighting Championship
- Date: April 21, 2023
- Venue: Delray Beach Tennis Center
- City: (United States) Delray Beach, Florida

BKFC 38 Delray Beach: Nguyen vs. Straus was a bare-knuckle fighting event held by Bare Knuckle Fighting Championship on April 21, 2023. The event was initially scheduled to take place on March 17, but due to undisclosed reasons it was postponed on the day of the event.

=== Results ===
BKFC 38 Delray Beach: Nguyen vs. Straus
Weight Class				Method	Round	Time	Notes
Featherweight 66 kg	(United States) Dat Nguyen	def.	(United States) Daniel Straus	Decision (unanimous)	6	2:00	The first five rounds were a draw. 57-56, 57-56, 58-55.
Middleweight 79 kg	(United States) Jake Bostwick	vs.	(United States) Isaac Doolittle	Draw (majority)	5	2:00	48-46, 47-47, 47-47
Flyweight 57 kg	(United States) Chancey Wilson	def.	(United States) Tyler Randall	Decision (split)	5	2:00	49-46, 46–49, 48–47
Light Heavyweight 84 kg	(United States) Erick Lozano	def.	(United States) Francesco Ricchi	KO	1	0:54	
Bantamweight 61 kg	(United States) Rene Rodriguez	def.	(United States) Mark Johnson	TKO	3	0:45	
Bantamweight 61 kg	(United States) Justin Sanchez	def.	(Mexico) Gilberto Aguilar	Decision (unanimous)	5	2:00	49-46, 49–46, 48–47
Bantamweight 61 kg	(United States) Gee Perez	def.	(United States) Josh Richey	KO	2	0:50	
Cruiserweight 93 kg	(United States) Stephen Townsel	def.	(United States) Chris Sarro	KO	3	2:00	
Preliminary Card
Flyweight 57 kg	(United States) Howard Davis	def.	(United States) Trevor Morris	TKO (corner stoppage)	4	2:00	
Featherweight 66 kg	(Ukraine) Bovar Khanakov	def.	(Cuba) Freddy Masabo	Decision (unanimous)	5	2:00	49-46, 49–46, 48–47
Bantamweight 61 kg	(United States) Chris Garcia	def.	(United States) Philip Carroll	KO	3	0:27	

== BKFC 40 Leeds: Holmes vs. Christie ==
BKFC 40 Leeds: Holmes vs. Christie
- Promotion: Bare Knuckle Fighting Championship
- Date: April 22, 2023
- Venue: Planet Ice Leeds
- City: Leeds, England

BKFC 40 Leeds: Holmes vs. Christie (also known as BKFC UK 3) was a bare-knuckle fighting event held by Bare Knuckle Fighting Championship on April 22, 2023.

=== Background ===
The event was initially scheduled to be headlined by welterweight bout between Elvin Brito and Jamie Cox, but the bout was cancelled after Cox withdrew.

=== Results ===
BKFC 40 Leeds: Holmes vs. Christie
Weight Class				Method	Round	Time	Notes
Light Heavyweight 84 kg	(United Kingdom) Danny Christie	def.	(United Kingdom) Anthony Holmes	KO	4		For the BKFC UK Light Heavyweight Championship. Time not provided, due to technical issues.
Welterweight 75 kg	(Argentina) Franco Tenaglia	def.	(United Kingdom) Luke Nevin	KO	4		Time not provided, due to technical issues.
Welterweight 75 kg	(United Kingdom) Rico Franco	def.	(United Kingdom) Axel Birbes	KO	2	1:07	
Cruiserweight 95 kg	(Northern Ireland) Conor Cooke	def.	(United Kingdom) Robbie Kennedy	KO	4	1:56	
Middleweight 79 kg	(United Kingdom) Tom Scott	def.	(Poland) Damian Górski	KO	4	1:44	
Lightweight 70 kg	(United Kingdom) Jonny Graham	def.	(United Kingdom) Will Cairns	KO	1	1:33	
Heavyweight 120 kg	(United Kingdom) Dawid Oskar	def.	(United Kingdom) Lee Browne	Decision (unanimous)	5	2:00	49-46, 49–46, 49–47
Catchweight 73 kg	(United Kingdom) Morgan Starkey	def.	(United Kingdom) Marius Radol	KO	1	0:23	
Preliminary Card
Light Heavyweight 84 kg	(Poland) Bart Król	def.	(United Kingdom) Ashley Griffiths	KO	1	1:04	
Heavyweight 120 kg	(Scotland) Rob Cunningham	def.	(United Kingdom) Wain Morgan	KO	2	1:03	
Light Heavyweight 84 kg	(United Kingdom) Arron Blakey	def.	(United Kingdom) Naff Higson	KO	1	0:50	

== BKFC 41 Colorado: Perry vs. Rockhold ==
BKFC 41 Colorado: Perry vs. Rockhold
- Promotion: Bare Knuckle Fighting Championship
- Date: April 29, 2023
- Venue: 1stBank Center
- City: (United States) Broomfield, Colorado

BKFC 41 Colorado: Perry vs. Rockhold was a bare-knuckle fighting event held by Bare Knuckle Fighting Championship on April 29, 2023. This event featured the debut of former UFC Middleweight champion Luke Rockhold, former UFC Lightweight champion Eddie Alvarez and former UFC Featherweight title contender Chad Mendes.

Former UFC Lightweight and Featherweight champion Conor McGregor was in attendance for this sold-out event.

Bonus awards

The following fighters were awarded bonuses:

- Fight of the Night: Eddie Alvarez vs. Chad Mendes
- Knockout of the Night: Dillon Winemiller

=== Results ===
BKFC 41 Colorado: Perry vs. Rockhold
Weight Class				Method	Round	Time	Notes
Light Heavyweight 84 kg	(United States) Mike Perry	def.	(United States) Luke Rockhold	TKO (retirement)	2	1:15	
Welterweight 80 kg	(United States) Eddie Alvarez	def.	(United States) Chad Mendes	Decision (split)	5	2:00	47-46, 46–47, 47–46
W.Flyweight 57 kg	(United States) Christine Ferea (c)	def.	(Australia) Bec Rawlings	TKO (doctor stoppage)	2	2:00	For the BKFC Women's Flyweight Championship.
Heavyweight 120 kg	(United States) Ben Rothwell	def.	(United States) Josh Copeland	TKO (corner stoppage)	3	2:00	
Cruiserweight 93 kg	(United States) Chris Camozzi	def.	(United States) Daniel Spohn	KO	1	2:00	
Welterweight 80 kg	(United States) Brandon Girtz	def.	(United States) Christian Torres	KO	1	1:10	
Lightweight 70 kg	(United States) James Brown	def.	(United States) Mike Alvarado	KO	2	2:00	
W.Featherweight 66 kg	(United States) Khortni Kamyron	vs.	(United States) Gabrielle Roman	Draw (majority)	5	2:00	48-46, 47-47, 47-47
Preliminary Card
Light Heavyweight 84 kg	(United States) Marcus Edwards	def.	(United States) Jay Jackson	KO	1	2:00	
Light Heavyweight 84 kg	(United States) Dillon Winemiller	def.	(United States) Matthew Maestas	KO	1	0:07	
Lightweight 70 kg	(United States) Mitch Seybold	def.	(United States) Jack Willoughby	KO	1	1:23	

== BKFC 42 Greenville: Soto vs. Goodjohn ==
BKFC 42 Greenville: Soto vs. Goodjohn
- Promotion: Bare Knuckle Fighting Championship
- Date: May 12, 2023
- Venue: Bon Secours Wellness Arena
- City: (United States) Greenville, South Carolina

BKFC 42 Greenville: Soto vs. Goodjohn was a bare-knuckle fighting event held by Bare Knuckle Fighting Championship on May 12, 2023.

Bonus awards

The following fighters were awarded bonuses:

- Fight of the Night: Tony Soto vs. Tyler Goodjohn
- Knockout of the Night: Brandon Allen

=== Results ===
BKFC 42 Greenville: Soto vs. Goodjohn
Weight Class				Method	Round	Time	Notes
Lightweight 70 kg	(United States) Tony Soto	def.	(England) Tyler Goodjohn	Decision (unanimous)	5	2:00	48-47, 48–47, 48–47.
Middleweight 79 kg	(United States) Doug Coltrane	def.	(United States) Blake LaCaze	KO	2	0:34	
Featherweight 66 kg	(United States) Keith Richardson	def.	(United States) Cody Jenkins	KO	1	1:41	
Strawweight 52 kg	(United States) Sydney Smith	def.	(United States) Andy Nguyen	Decision (unanimous)	5	2:00	48-46, 48–46, 48–46.
Featherweight 66 kg	(United States) Brandon Allen	def.	(United States) Trevor Loken	KO	1	1:29	
Featherweight 66 kg	(United States) Brandon Bushaw	vs.	(United States) Rick Caruso	No contest (accidental illegal blow)	2	0:33	
Welterweight 75 kg	(United States) Dustin Pague	def.	(United States) Wade Johnson	TKO	2	1:38	
Welterweight 75 kg	(United States) Trukon Carson	def.	(United States) LJ Hermreck	TKO	1	1:16	
Featherweight 66 kg	(United States) Cole Ferrell	def.	(United States) Cody Schieve	TKO	2	0:44	
Preliminary Card
Cruiserweight 95 kg	(United States) Jonathan Miller	def.	(United States) Dustin Long	TKO	2	2:00	
Featherweight 66 kg	(United States) Samuel Samples	def.	(United States) Glendel Futrell	TKO (corner stoppage)	2	2:00	
Lightweight 70 kg	(United States) Cole Ferrell	def.	(United States) Cody Schieve	TKO	2	0:44	

== BKFC 43 Omaha: Alexander vs. Smith ==
BKFC 43 Omaha: Alexander vs. Smith
- Promotion: Bare Knuckle Fighting Championship
- Date: May 19, 2023
- Venue: Liberty First Credit Union Arena
- City: (United States) Omaha, Nebraska

BKFC 43 Omaha: Alexander vs. Smith was a bare-knuckle fighting event held by Bare Knuckle Fighting Championship on May 19, 2023.

=== Results ===
BKFC 43 Omaha: Alexander vs. Smith
Weight Class				Method	Round	Time	Notes
Cruiserweight 93 kg	(United States) Houston Alexander	def.	(South Africa) Jeremy Smith	Decision (unanimous)	5	2:00	48-46, 48–46, 48–47
Middleweight 79 kg	(United States) Dakota Cochrane	def.	(United States) Noah Cutter	KO	1	0:56	
Featherweight 66 kg	(United States) Jimmie Rivera	def.	(Uzbekistan) Bekhzod Usmonov	Decision (unanimous)	5	2:00	48-47, 48–47, 48–47
Lightweight 70 kg	(United States) Sean Wilson	def.	(United States) Brandon Meyer	Decision (unanimous)	5	2:00	50-44, 50–44, 50–44
Middleweight 79 kg	(United States) Alonzo Martinez	def.	(United States) Jeremy Sauceda	TKO (corner stoppage)	4	2:00	
Welterweight 75 kg	(United States) Carlos Trinidad-Snake	def.	(United States) Elvin Leon Brito	Decision (unanimous)	5	2:00	48-46, 48–46, 49–45
Cruiserweight 95 kg	(United States) Ryan Braun	def.	(United States) Andrew Potter	KO	1	0:17	
W. Flyweight 57 kg	(Canada) Jade Masson-Wong	def.	(United States) Taylor Starling	Decision (unanimous)	5	2:00	48-46, 48–46, 50–44
Cruiserweight 95 kg	(United States) Jeff Souder	def.	(United States) Idrees Wasi	Decision (unanimous)	5	2:00	50-43, 50–43, 50–43
Preliminary Card
Featherweight 66 kg	(South Africa) Tommy Strydom	def.	(United States) Josh Krejci	KO	2	1:31	
Cruiserweight 95 kg	(United States) Esteban Rodriguez	def.	(United States) Jaquis Williams	TKO (corner stoppage)	1	1:26	
Featherweight 66 kg	(United States) Corey Roberts	def.	(United States) TJ Benson	KO	2	0:45	

== BKFC 44 Montana: Stewart vs. Lopez ==
BKFC 44 Montana: Stewart vs. Lopez
- Promotion: Bare Knuckle Fighting Championship
- Date: June 9, 2023
- Venue: Four Seasons Arena
- City: (United States) Great Falls, Montana

BKFC 44 Montana: Stewart vs. Lopez was a bare-knuckle fighting event held by Bare Knuckle Fighting Championship on June 9, 2023.

The card was headlined by Kai Stewart vs. Louie Lopez for the inaugural BKFC Featherweight Championship.

Bonus awards

The following fighters were awarded bonuses:

- Fight of the Night: Kai Stewart vs. Louie Lopez
- Knockout of the Night: Leo Bercier

=== Results ===
BKFC 44 Montana: Stewart vs. Lopez
Weight Class				Method	Round	Time	Notes
Featherweight 66 kg	(United States) Kai Stewart	def.	(United States) Louie Lopez	Decision (unanimous)	5	2:00	For the inaugural BKFC Featherweight Championship. 49-45, 48-46, 48-46.
Welterweight 75 kg	(United States) Lloyd Mix	def.	(United States) Dallas Davison	TKO (corner stoppage)	4	2:00	
Welterweight 75 kg	(United States) Bryce Henry	def.	(United States) Billy Wagner	TKO (corner stoppage)	3	2:00	
Cruiserweight 95 kg	(United States) Sawyer Depee	def.	(United States) Gabriel Mota	KO	1	0:46	
Welterweight 75 kg	(United States) Jordan Christensen	def.	(United States) Kerry Lattimer	Decision (unanimous)	5	2:00	50-44, 50–44, 49–45
Lightweight 70 kg	(United States) Dorian Long	def.	(United States) Mark Johnson	KO	2	1:59	
Featherweight 66 kg	(United States) Ryan Ibsen	def.	(United States) Dakote Highpine	TKO (corner stoppage)	2	2:00	
Heavyweight	(United States) Brady Meister	def.	(United States) Connor McKenna	TKO	2	1:35	
Preliminary Card
Cruiserweight 95 kg	(United States) Leo Bercier	def.	(United States) Willie Sears	KO	1	1:55	
Featherweight 66 kg	(United States) Darrick Gates	def.	(United States) Koda Greenwood	KO	1	1:20	
Bantamweight 61 kg	(United States) Dre Coles	def.	(United States) David Loureiro	Decision (unanimous)	5	2:00	49-45, 49–45, 49–45

== BKFC 45 Hollywood, FL: Palomino vs. Lilley ==
BKFC 45 Hollywood, FL: Palomino vs. Lilley
- Promotion: Bare Knuckle Fighting Championship
- Date: June 23, 2023
- Venue: Seminole Hard Rock Hotel & Casino Hollywood
- City: (United States) Hollywood, Florida

BKFC 45 Hollywood, FL: Palomino vs. Lilley was a bare-knuckle fighting event held by Bare Knuckle Fighting Championship on June 23, 2023.

The event was headlined by double champion Luis Palomino defending his BKFC Lightweight title against James Lilley.

=== Results ===
BKFC 45 Hollywood, FL: Palomino vs. Lilley
Weight Class				Method	Round	Time	Notes
Lightweight 70 kg	(Peru) Luis Palomino (c)	def.	(Wales) James Lilley	Decision (unanimous)	5	2:00	For the BKFC Lightweight Championship. 48-47, 48-47, 49-46.
Light Heavyweight 84 kg	(England) Jake Bostwick	def.	(United States) Erick Lozano	Decision (unanimous)	5	2:00	50-45, 49–46, 49–46
Welterweight 75 kg	(United States) Howard Davis	def.	(Mexico) Eduardo Peralta	KO	1	1:32	
Lightweight 70 kg	(United States) Bryan Duran	def.	(Mexico) Gilberto Aguilar	KO	3	2:00	
Welterweight 75 kg	(United States) James Dennis	def.	(United States) Rene Rodriguez	KO	2	1:32	
Bantamweight 61 kg	(United States) Gee Perez	def.	(United States) Philip Ryan Carroll	KO	1	1:52	
Bantamweight 61 kg	(Cuba) Alberto Blas	def.	(United States) Robert Armas	KO	1	0:47	
Cruiserweight 95 kg	(United States) Dillion Winemiller	def.	(United States) Stephen Townsel	KO	2	1:07	
Preliminary Card
Heavyweight	(United States) Leonardo Perdomo	def.	(United States) Joseph White	KO	1	1:18	
Bantamweight 61 kg	(United States) Chris Garcia	def.	(United States) Robert Madrid	KO	3	2:00	
Cruiserweight 95 kg	(United States) Mike Lee	def.	(United States) Drew Nolan	KO	1	1:26	

== BKFC 46 Newcastle: Franco vs. Harris ==
BKFC 46 Newcastle: Franco vs. Harris
- Promotion: Bare Knuckle Fighting Championship
- Date: July 1, 2023
- Venue: Walker Activity Dome
- City: Newcastle upon Tyne, England

BKFC 46 Newcastle: Franco vs. Harris (also known as BKFC UK 4) was a bare-knuckle fighting event held by Bare Knuckle Fighting Championship on July 1, 2023.

=== Results ===
BKFC 46 Newcastle: Franco vs. Harris
Weight Class				Method	Round	Time	Notes
Welterweight 75 kg	(England) Ricardo Franco	def.	(United States) Kaleb Harris	KO	5	0:58	
Welterweight 75 kg	(England) Robert Barry	def.	(United Kingdom) Ben Bonner	KO	5	0:11	
Welterweight 75 kg	(England) Lewis Keen	def.	(Czech Republic) Zdeněk Pernica	KO	3	0:32	
Cruiserweight 95 kg	(Poland) Dawid Oskar	def.	(United Kingdom) Matty Hill	KO	1	1:44	
Welterweight 75 kg	(United Kingdom) Paul Cook	def.	(England) Aaron Foster	KO	1	0:41	
Light Heavyweight 84 kg	(Poland) Bart Król	def.	(United Kingdom) Sebastian Krautwald	Decision (unanimous)	5	2:00	48-46, 48–46, 48–46
Featherweight 66 kg	(United Kingdom) Gary Fox	def.	(England) Hayden Sherriff	KO	1	0:38	
Featherweight 66 kg	(Poland) Patryk Sagan	def.	(England) Morgan Starkey	KO	1	0:49	
Preliminary Card
Featherweight 66 kg	(England) Robbie Brown	def.	(United Kingdom) Ben Hatchett	KO	1	1:36	
Middleweight 79 kg	(England) Arron Blakey	def.	(Poland) Krystian Nadolski	KO	1	0:38	
Cruiserweight 95 kg	(United Kingdom) Karl Thompson	def.	(United Kingdom) Dustin Rabiega	KO	1	1:06	

== BKFC 47 Lakeland: Mundell vs. Richman ==
BKFC 47 Lakeland: Mundell vs. Richman
- Promotion: Bare Knuckle Fighting Championship
- Date: July 14, 2023
- Venue: Jenkins Arena
- City: (United States) Lakeland, Florida

BKFC 47 Lakeland: Mundell vs. Richman was a bare-knuckle fighting event held by Bare Knuckle Fighting Championship on July 14, 2023.

Bonus awards

The following fighters were awarded bonuses:

- Fight of the Night: Ryan Reber vs. Travis Thompson
- Knockout of the Night: Brandon Allen

=== Results ===
BKFC 47 Lakeland: Mundell vs. Richman
Weight Class				Method	Round	Time	Notes
Middleweight 79 kg	(United States) David Mundell (c)	def.	(United States) Mike Richman	KO	2	1:54	For the BKFC Middleweight Championship.
Light Heavyweight 84 kg	(United States) Josh Dyer	vs.	(United States) Jared Warren	NC (strike to back of head)	2	2:00	For the interim BKFC Light Heavyweight Championship.
Featherweight 66 kg	(United States) Brandon Allen	def.	(United States) Seth Shaffer	KO	2	0:50	
Bantamweight 61 kg	(United States) Ryan Reber	vs.	(United States) Travis Thompson	Draw (majority)	6	2:00	56-57, 57-56, 57-56. Overtime sixth round.
Women's Flyweight 57 kg	(United States) Gabrielle Roman	def.	(Poland) Martyna Krol	KO	1	2:00	
Middleweight 79 kg	(United States) Tony Murphy	def.	(United States) Michael Jones	KO	3	1:16	
Women's Bantamweight 61 kg	(United States) Crystal Pittman	def.	(United States) Toni Tallman	KO	2	1:07	
Preliminary Card
Welterweight 75 kg	(United States) Ja'Far Fortt	def.	(United States) Tim Hester	KO	3	1:58	
Featherweight 66 kg	(United States) Michael Larrimore	def.	(United States) Daniel Gary	KO	1	0:22	

== BKFC 48 Albuquerque: Dodson vs. Ridge ==
BKFC 48 Albuquerque: Dodson vs. Ridge
- Promotion: Bare Knuckle Fighting Championship
- Date: August 11, 2023
- Venue: Tingley Coliseum
- City: (United States) Albuquerque, New Mexico

BKFC 48 Albuquerque: Dodson vs. Ridge was a bare-knuckle fighting event held by Bare Knuckle Fighting Championship on August 11, 2023.

The event was headlined by John Dodson vs. JR Ridge, which crowned the inaugural BKFC Flyweight Champion.

Social media influencer Bryce Hall made his debut in the sport against Gee Perez at this event and was victorious.

Bonus awards

The following fighters were awarded bonuses:

- Fight of the Night: Anthony Sanchez vs. Gene Perez
- Knockout of the Night: Keith Richardson

=== Results ===
BKFC 48 Albuquerque: Dodson vs. Ridge
Weight Class				Method	Round	Time	Notes
Flyweight 57 kg	(United States) John Dodson	def.	(United States) JR Ridge	TKO	1	1:49	For the inaugural BKFC Flyweight Championship.
Bantamweight 61 kg	(United States) Keith Richardson	def.	(United States) Derek Perez	TKO	1	0:37	
Welterweight 75 kg	(United States) Bryce Hall	def.	(United States) Gee Perez	TKO (doctor stoppage)	2	5:00	
Middleweight 79 kg	(United States) Joshua Moreno	def.	(United States) Jeremy Sauceda	TKO (corner stoppage)	1	5:00	
Middleweight 79 kg	(United States) Will Santiago	vs.	(United States) Jeremie Holloway	Draw (majority)	5	2:00	48-46, 47-47, 47-47
Featherweight 66 kg	(United States) Robert Armas	def.	(United States) Eric Dodson	Decision (unanimous)	5	2:00	49-44, 50–45, 47–46
Light Heavyweight 84 kg	(United States) Donald Sanchez	def.	(United States) Anthony Lacaze	Decision (unanimous)	5	2:00	50-44, 48–46, 50–44
W. Strawweight 52 kg	(United Kingdom) Melanie Shah	def.	(United States) Sydney Smith	Decision (unanimous)	5	2:00	Shah weighed 118 lbs. 49–46, 49–46, 49–46
Featherweight 66 kg	(United States) Marc Entenberg	d.	(United States) Darrick Gates	TKO (doctor stoppage)	2	0:14	
Preliminary Card
Cruiserweight 95 kg	(United States) Kyle McElroy	def.	(United States) Richard Montano	TKO	2	0:55	
Bantamweight 61 kg	(United States) Anthony Sanchez	def.	(United States) Gene Perez	Decision (split)	5	2:00	48-47, 47–48, 49–46
Flyweight 57 kg	(United States) Austin Lewis	NC	(United States) Justyn Martinez	NC (punch after the bell)	1	5:00	

== BKFC Prospects Series 1 ==
BKFC Prospects Series 1
- Promotion: Bare Knuckle Fighting Championship
- Date: August 25, 2023
- Venue: Miami-Dade Fairgrounds
- City: (United States) Miami, Florida

BKFC Prospects Series 1 was a bare-knuckle fighting event held by Bare Knuckle Fighting Championship on August 24, 2023. It was the first edition of the BKFC Prospects Series.

=== Results ===
BKFC Prospects Series 1
Weight Class				Method	Round	Time	Notes
W.Flyweight 57 kg	(United States) Rosalina Rodriguez	def.	(United States) Cristina Crist	Decision (unanimous)	5	2:00	50-44, 50–45, 49–43
Heavyweight 120 kg	(United States) Leonardo Perdomo	def.	(United States) Ryan Shough	KO	1	0:59	
Light Heavyweight 84 kg	(United States) Drew Nolan	def.	(United States) Markus Suarez	TKO (doctor stoppage)	2	1:22	
Light Heavyweight 84 kg	(United States) Fred Pierce	def.	(United States) Sean Hotusing	DQ (illegal ground strike)	2	1:38	
Bantamweight 61 kg	(United States) Dameko Labon	def.	(United States) Justin Watson	KO	1	0:21	
Welterweight 75 kg	(United States) Leandro Torres	def.	(Puerto Rico) Harry Cruz	KO	3	1:29	

== BKFC 49 Miami: Slaveski vs. Lindsey ==
BKFC 49 Miami: Slaveski vs. Lindsey
- Promotion: Bare Knuckle Fighting Championship
- Date: August 25, 2023
- Venue: Miami-Dade Fairgrounds
- City: (United States) Miami, Florida
- Attendance: 2,743

BKFC 49 Miami: Slaveski vs. Lindsey was a bare-knuckle fighting event held by Bare Knuckle Fighting Championship on August 25, 2023.

Bonus awards

The following fighters were awarded bonuses:

- Fights of the Night: Freddy Masabo vs. Bovar Khanakov and John Michael Escoboza vs. Esteban Rodriguez
- Knockout of the Night: Matthew Russo

=== Results ===
BKFC 49 Miami: Slaveski vs. Lindsey
Weight Class				Method	Round	Time	Notes
Welterweight 75 kg	(North Macedonia) Gorjan Slaveski	def.	(United States) Jake Lindsey	Decision (unanimous)	5	2:00	For the vacant BKFC Welterweight Championship. 49-46, 48-47, 49-46.
Lightweight 70 kg	(United States) Bryce Henry	def.	(United States) Tom Shoaff	KO	1	1:29	
Featherweight 66 kg	(United States) Bryan Duran	def.	(United States) Dakota Highpine	KO	1	0:48	
Bantamweight 61 kg	(United States) Justin Ibarrola	def.	(United States) Anthony Foye	Decision (unanimous)	5	2:00	48-47, 49–46, 48–47
Bantamweight 61 kg	(Cuba) Alberto Blas	def.	(Brazil) Joao Guerra	KO	1	1:12	
Featherweight 66 kg	(United States) Howard Davis	def.	(United States) Jeff Chiffens	KO	1	1:12	
Lightweight 70 kg	(United States) Joshuah Alvarez	def.	(United States) Aaron Sutterfield	KO	1	1:29	
W. Strawweight 52 kg	(Peru) Laddy Mejia	def.	(United States) Sarah Click	Decision (split)	5	2:00	49-46, 48–47, 47–48
Bantamweight 61 kg	(United States) Matthew Russo	def.	(United States) Jaymes Hyder	KO	1	1:16	
Preliminary Card
Featherweight 66 kg	(Cuba) Freddy Masabo	def.	(Ukraine) Bovar Khanakov	Decision (unanimous)	5	2:00	48-47, 48–47, 48–47
Cruiserweight 93 kg	(Dominican Republic) John Michael Escoboza	def.	(United States) Esteban Rodriguez	Decision (majority)	5	2:00	48–46, 48–46, 47-47

== BKFC 50 Denver: Hunt vs. Camozzi ==
BKFC 50 Denver: Hunt vs. Camozzi
- Promotion: Bare Knuckle Fighting Championship
- Date: September 22, 2023
- Venue: 1stBank Center
- City: (United States) Denver, Colorado

BKFC 50 Denver: Hunt vs. Camozzi was a bare-knuckle fighting event held by Bare Knuckle Fighting Championship on September 22, 2023.

=== Background ===
The event was headlined by the two-division champion Lorenzo Hunt defending his BKFC Cruiserweight Championship for the first time against UFC veteran Chris Camozzi.

Bonus awards

The following fighters were awarded bonuses:

- Knockout of the Night: Andrew Strode

=== Results ===
BKFC 50 Denver: Hunt vs. Camozzi
Weight Class				Method	Round	Time	Notes
Cruiserweight 93 kg	(United States) Lorenzo Hunt (c)	def.	(United States) Chris Camozzi	Decision (split)	5	2:00	For the BKFC Cruiserweight Championship. 48-47, 47-48, 49-46.
Heavyweight	(United States) Josh Copeland	def.	(United States) Steve Hérélius	KO	3	1:43	
Middleweight 79 kg	(United States) Marcus Edwards	def.	(United States) Michael Manno	Decision (unanimous)	5	2:00	50-45, 50–45, 50–45
Cruiserweight 93 kg	(United States) Keegan Vandermeer	def.	(United States) Dillon Winemiller	KO	1	1:09	
Bantamweight 61 kg	(Cuba) Alberto Blas	def.	(Brazil) Joao Guerra	KO	1	1:12	
Lightweight 70 kg	(United States) Andrew Angelcor	def.	(United States) Brett Hudson	KO	1	1:09	
Light Heavyweight 86 kg	(United States) Tony Jenkins	def.	(United States) Brian Maronek	KO	1	1:18	
Welterweight 75 kg	(United States) Andrew Yates	def.	(United States) Christian Torres	Decision (unanimous)	5	2:00	48–47, 48–47, 48–47
W. Bantamweight 61 kg	(United States) Monica Franco	def.	(United States) Khortni Kamyron	Decision (split)	5	2:00	46–49, 48–46, 48–47
Flyweight 57 kg	(United States) Andrew Strode	def.	(United States) Cary Caprio	KO	2	0:40	
Preliminary Card
Flyweight 57 kg	(United States) Dominick Carey	def.	(United States) Angelo Trujillo	DQ (illegal strikes)	1	0:38	
Cruiserweight 93 kg	(United States) Lamont Stafford	def.	(United States) Gabriel Mota	KO	3	0:40	
Middleweight 79 kg	(United States) Zeb Vincent	def.	(United States) Jessie Stalder	KO	1	0:59	

== BKFC 51 Salem: Hart vs. Shah ==
BKFC 51 Salem: Hart vs. Shah
- Promotion: Bare Knuckle Fighting Championship
- Date: September 30, 2023
- Venue: Salem Civic Center
- City: (United States) Salem, Virginia

BKFC 51 Salem: Hart vs. Shah was a bare-knuckle fighting event held by Bare Knuckle Fighting Championship on September 30, 2023.

=== Background ===
The event was headlined by Britain Hart defending her BKFC Women's Strawweight Championship for the second time against Melanie Shah.

=== Results ===
BKFC 51 Salem: Hart vs. Shah
Weight Class				Method	Round	Time	Notes
W. Strawweight 52 kg	(United States) Britain Hart (c)	def.	(United Kingdom) Melanie Shah	Decision (unanimous)	5	2:00	For the BKFC Women's Strawweight Championship. 50-45, 50-45, 50-45.
Welterweight 75 kg	(United States) Dustin Pague	def.	(United States) Joe Elmore	Decision (unanimous)	5	2:00	50-45, 50-45, 50-45
Middleweight 79 kg	(Moldova) Stanislav Grosu	def.	(United States) Blake LaCaze	KO	2	1:51	
Cruiserweight 93 kg	(United States) Bruce Abramski	def.	(United States) Mark Culp	KO	1	0:43	
Lightweight 70 kg	(United States) Andrew Angelcor	def.	(United States) Brett Hudson	KO	1	1:09	
Light Heavyweight 86 kg	(United States) Joseph Creer	def.	(United States) Ronnie Glass	KO	3	1:18	
Light Heavyweight 86 kg	(United States) Harris Stephenson	def.	(United States) Brian Maxwell	DQ (illegal strike to grounded opponent)	5	0:29	
Middleweight 79 kg	(United States) Kaine Tomlinson	def.	(United States) Brett Fields	KO	1	1:39	
Bantamweight 61 kg	(United States) Rick Caruso	def.	(United States) Landon Williams	KO	1	1:43	
Preliminary Card
Lightweight 70 kg	(United States) Ka'Sim Ruffin	def.	(United States) Daniel Gary	KO	3	0:40	
Middleweight 79 kg	(United States) Zeb Vincent	def.	(United States) Jessie Stalder	KO	1	0:59	

== BKFC Prospects Series 2 ==
BKFC Prospects Series 2
- Promotion: Bare Knuckle Fighting Championship
- Date: October 14, 2023
- Venue: Liverpool Olympia
- City: (United Kingdom) Liverpool, England

BKFC Prospects Series 2 was a bare-knuckle fighting event held by Bare Knuckle Fighting Championship on October 14, 2023.

=== Results ===
BKFC Prospects Series 2
Weight Class				Method	Round	Time	Notes
Bantamweight 61 kg	(United Kingdom) Jonno Chipchase	def.	(Sweden) Anton Larsson	KO	1	1:24	
Featherweight 66 kg	(United Kingdom) Terry Needham	def.	(United Kingdom) Morgan Starkey	TKO	2	1:25	
Cruiserweight 93 kg	(Czech Republic) Dominik Herold	def.	(United Kingdom) Zane Marks	TKO (doctor stoppage)	2	2:00	
Featherweight 66 kg	(United Kingdom) Bradley Taylor	def.	(United Kingdom) Harry Cain	Decision (unanimous)	5	2:00	Judges' scorecards not read
Middleweight 79 kg	(United Kingdom) Marcus Pond	def.	(United Kingdom) Ryan Harris	KO	2	1:20	
Lightweight 70 kg	(United States) Ray Putterill	def.	(United States) George Buckell	TKO	3	1:21	
Cruiserweight 93 kg	(United Kingdom) Andy Thornton	def.	(United Kingdom) Lee Browne	TKO	2	1:24	
Lightweight 70 kg	(United Kingdom) Bartek Kanabey	def.	(United Kingdom) Shaun Kissane	Decision (split)	5	2:00	48–46, 48–46, 47–48
Light Heavyweight 84 kg	(United Kingdom) Peter Hayes	def.	(United Kingdom) Dean Hunt	TKO	1	0:49	
Heavyweight 120 kg	(United Kingdom) Marti Barnes	def.	(United Kingdom) Micky Pedersen	KO	2	1:47	

== BKFC 52 South Carolina: Barnett vs. Richardson ==
BKFC 52 South Carolina: Barnett vs. Richardson
- Promotion: Bare Knuckle Fighting Championship
- Date: October 20, 2023
- Venue: Colonial Life Arena
- City: (United States) Columbia, South Carolina

BKFC 52 South Carolina: Barnett vs. Richardson was a bare-knuckle fighting event held by Bare Knuckle Fighting Championship on October 20, 2023.

=== Background ===
The event was headlined by Reggie Barnett Jr. defending his BKFC Bantamweight Championship against Keith Richardson.

Bonus awards

The following fighters were awarded bonuses:

- Fight of the Night: Tony Soto vs. Kevin Croom
- Knockout of the Night: Brandon Bushaw
- Performance of the Night: Keith Richardson

=== Results ===
BKFC 52 South Carolina: Barnett vs. Richardson
Weight Class				Method	Round	Time	Notes
Bantamweight 61 kg	(United States) Keith Richardson	def.	(United States) Reggie Barnett Jr. (c)	TKO	2	0:58	For the BKFC Bantamweight Championship.
Lightweight 70 kg	(United States) Tony Soto	def.	(United States) Kevin Croom	Decision (unanimous)	5	2:00	50–45, 50–45, 48–47
Welterweight 75 kg	(United States) Jeremie Holloway	def.	(United States) Cameron VanCamp	Decision (unanimous)	5	2:00	49–46, 48–47, 49–46
Featherweight 66 kg	(United States) Solon Staley	def.	(United States) Darrick Gates	TKO (doctor stoppage)	1	2:00	
Lightweight 70 kg	(United States) Brandon Bushaw	def.	(United States) Josh Marer	KO	2	0:50	
Lightweight 70 kg	(United States) Jeremiah Scott	def.	(United States) Chevy Bridges	KO	3	1:56	
Bantamweight 61 kg	(United States) Derek Perez	def.	(United States) Ace Samples	TKO	2	0:44	
Welterweight 75 kg	(United States) Trukon Carson	def.	(United States) Daishaun Middleton	KO	1	1:01	
Preliminary Card
Light heavyweight 84 kg	(United States) Daniel Cooper	def.	(United States) Miach Lail	TKO (doctor stoppage)	4	2:00	
Featherweight 66 kg	(Tajikistan) Bekhzod Usmonov	def.	(United States) Trevor Loken	TKO	3	0:24	

== BKFC 53 Orlando: Mundell vs. Coltrane ==
BKFC 53 Orlando: Mundell vs. Coltrane
- Promotion: Bare Knuckle Fighting Championship
- Date: November 3, 2023
- Venue: Orange County Convention Center
- City: (United States) Orlando, Florida

BKFC 53 Orlando: Mundell vs. Coltrane was a bare-knuckle fighting event held by Bare Knuckle Fighting Championship on November 3, 2023.

=== Results ===
BKFC 53 Orlando: Mundell vs. Coltrane
Weight Class				Method	Round	Time	Notes
Middleweight 79 kg	(United States) David Mundell (c)	def.	(United States) Doug Coltrane	TKO	2	1:23	For the BKFC Middleweight Championship.
Middleweight 79 kg	(United States) Julian Lane	def.	(Turkey) Murat Kazgan	TKO (doctor stoppage)	3	1:53	
Heavyweight 120 kg	(United States) Sawyer Depee	def.	(United States) Jonathan Miller	KO	1	2:00	
Light heavyweight 84 kg	(Ecuador) Diego Romo	vs.	(United States) Ravon Baxter	Draw (majority)	5	2:00	48-46. 47-47, 47-47
Featherweight 66 kg	(United States) Nathan Rivera	def.	(United States) Jaymes Hyder	KO	1	1:21	
Light heavyweight 84 kg	(United States) Mike Heckert	def.	(United States) Scott Lampert	TKO (corner stoppage)	2	0:53	
Flyweight 57 kg	(Dominican Republic) Dagoberto Aguero	def.	(United States) Chance Wilson	TKO	3	1:24	
Preliminary Card
Featherweight 66 kg	(United States) Michael Larrimore	def.	(United States) Justin Watson	KO	1	1:01	
Cruiserweight 95 kg	(United States) Jeff Janvier	def.	(United States) Devonte Jeffery	TKO (doctor stoppage)	2	1:09	
Welterweight 75 kg	(United States) Ja'Far Fortt	def.	(United States) Aaron Sutterfield	TKO	1	0:28	

== BKFC Thailand 5: Legends of Siam ==
BKFC Thailand 5: Legends of Siam
- Promotion: Bare Knuckle Fighting Championship
- Date: November 4, 2023
- Venue: Royal Cliff Hotels Group
- City: (Thailand) Pattaya

BKFC Thailand 5: Legends of Siam was a bare-knuckle fighting event held by Bare Knuckle Fighting Championship on November 4, 2023.

=== Background ===
The event was headlined by a Special Rules Bare Knuckle Thai Fight featuring Muay Thai icons Buakaw Banchamek vs. Saenchai, who were scheduled to face each other in March 2023.

The co-main event featured a title match between defending champion Fani Peloumpi and Po Denman for the BKFC Thailand Strawweight Championship. Also on the card was a title fight for the vacant BKFC Thailand Featherweight Championship between Krisana Srisang and Sarun Srioumboo.

Bonus awards

The following fighters were awarded bonuses:

- Fight of the Night: Pongpisan Chunyong vs. Tha Pyay Nyo

=== Results ===
BKFC Thailand 5: Legends of Siam
Weight Class				Method	Round	Time	Notes
Lightweight 70 kg	(Thailand) Buakaw Banchamek	vs.	(Thailand) Saenchai	Decision (unanimous) (49–46, 50–46, 48–47)	5	2:00	Special rules Bare Knuckle Thai bout
W.Strawweight 52 kg	(Thailand) Po Denman	vs.	(Greece) Fani Peloumpi (c)	Decision (unanimous) (49–46, 48–47, 49–46)	5	2:00	For the BKFC Thailand Women's Strawweight Championship
Featherweight 66 kg	(Thailand) Krisana Srisang	vs.	(Thailand) Sarun Srioumboo	KO	3	0:18	For the vacant BKFC Thailand Featherweight Championship
Lightweight 70 kg	(Germany) Kristof Kirsch	vs.	(England) Teejay Chang	KO	2	0:45	
Cruiserweight 93 kg	(Germany) Daniel Dörrer	vs.	(Sweden) Tofan Pirani	TKO (referee stoppage)	1	2:00	Hand injury.
Featherweight 66 kg	(Scotland) Andrew Miller	vs.	(Thailand) Teerawat Wongon	KO	1	1:13	
Featherweight 66 kg	(Philippines) Joemil Miado	vs.	(Sweden) Gustaf Cedermalm	KO	2	0:43	
Light Heavyweight 84 kg	(Canada) Jonny Tello	vs.	(Thailand) Chaloemporn Sawatsuk	TKO	5	0:50	
Cruiserweight 93 kg	(Iran) Purya Rokhneh	vs.	(France) Yohann Marin	KO	2		
Preliminary Card
Featherweight 66 kg	(Thailand) Pongpisan Chunyong	vs.	(Myanmar) Tha Pyay Nyo	Decision (unanimous) (50–44, 50–44, 50–44)	5	2:00	
Middleweight 79 kg	(Russia) Mike Vetrila	vs.	(Philippines) Allen Wycoco	Decision (unanimous) (50–44, 50–44, 50–44)	5	2:00	
Lightweight 70 kg	(Thailand) Tumba	vs.	(Thailand) Maseng Sornchai	Decision (split) (48–47, 48–47, 47–48)	5	2:00	

== BKFC 54 Bulgaria: Dimitrov vs. Zhelyakov ==
BKFC 54 Bulgaria: Dimitrov vs. Zhelyakov
- Promotion: Bare Knuckle Fighting Championship
- Date: November 17, 2023
- Venue: Arena Sofia
- City: Sofia, Bulgaria

BKFC 54 Bulgaria: Dimitrov vs. Zhelyakov was a bare-knuckle fighting event held by Bare Knuckle Fighting Championship on November 17, 2023.

=== Background ===
The event was headliend by a middleweight bout between Rosen Dimitrov and Todor Zhelyakov. This event was notable in part because all of the fighters were new to the BKFC.

=== Results ===
BKFC 54 Bulgaria: Dimitrov vs. Zhelyakov
Weight Class				Method	Round	Time	Notes
Middleweight 79 kg	(Bulgaria) Rosen Dimitrov	vs.	(Bulgaria) Todor Zhelyakov	KO	1	1:41	
Middleweight 79 kg	(Slovenia) Bojan Kosendar	vs.	(Bulgaria) Georgi Valentinov	Decision (unanimous)	5	2:00	Judges' scores not read.
Lightweight 70 kg	(Bulgaria) Vladislav Kanchev	vs.	(Kazakhstan) Ilyas Sadykov	KO	1	0:54	
Middleweight 79 kg	(Bulgaria) Kaloyan Kolev	vs.	(Lebanon) Amer Abdulnabi	TKO (retired)	1	0:57	Abdulnabi was forced to retire due to an equipment malfunction (faulty right shoe.)
Middleweight 79 kg	(Bulgaria) Marian Dimitrov	vs.	(Poland) Jedrzej Durski	Decision (unanimous)	5	2:00	Judges' scores not read.
Featherweight 66 kg	(Egypt) Mahmoud Ahmed	vs.	(Romania) Florin Lupu	Decision (unanimous)	5	2:00	Judges' scores not read.
Cruiserweight 93 kg	(Bulgaria) Veselin Ivanov	vs.	(Italy) Marco Giustarini	KO	3	1:08	
Heavyweight 120 kg	(Turkey) Ynus Batan	vs.	(Bulgaria) Mladen Iliev	TKO (strikes)	3	0:40	
Middleweight 79 kg	(France) Steve Pasche	vs.	(Turkey) Mehmet Ozer	TKO (doctor stoppage)	1	1:30	Ozer was unable to continue due to a torn bicep.
Preliminary Card
Lightweight 70 kg	(Bulgaria) Angel Petkov	vs.	(Bulgaria) Nikola Arsov	Decision (split)	5	2:00	Judges' scores not read.
Lightweight 70 kg	(Brazil) Felipe da Silva Maia	vs.	(Bulgaria) Martin Stoichkov	KO	2	1:55	
Featherweight 66 kg	(Slovakia) Tomas Vojtela	vs.	(Bulgaria) Zdravko Dimitrov	TKO (doctor stoppage)	3	0:30	Eye injury.

== BKFC 55 Leeds: Christie vs. Warren ==
BKFC 55 Leeds: Christie vs. Warren
- Promotion: Bare Knuckle Fighting Championship
- Date: November 18, 2023
- Venue: Planet Ice Leeds
- City: Leeds, England

BKFC 55 Leeds: Christie vs. Warren (also known as BKFC UK 5) was a bare-knuckle fighting event held by Bare Knuckle Fighting Championship on November 18, 2023.

=== Background ===
Antonio Moscatiello was set to face Patryk Sagan, however Sagan withdrew prior to the event for undisclosed reasons, and was replaced by Hynek Hospodarsky.

=== Results ===
BKFC 55 Leeds: Christie vs. Warren
Weight Class				Method	Round	Time	Notes
Light heavyweight 84 kg	(United States) Jared Warren	vs.	(United Kingdom) Danny Christie	TKO (referee stoppage)	1	1:56	
Middleweight 79 kg	(Poland) Bartlomiej Krol	vs.	(United Kingdom) Anthony Holmes	TKO (corner stoppage)	4	2:00	
Cruiserweight 93 kg	(United Kingdom) Matty Hodgson	vs.	(United Kingdom) Mason Shaw	TKO (strikes)	2	0:29	
Light heavyweight 84 kg	(United Kingdom) Danny Mitchell	vs.	(United Kingdom) John Ferguson	Decision (unanimous)	5	2:00	Judges' scores not read.
Cruiserweight 93 kg	(United Kingdom) Darren Hendry	vs.	(United Kingdom) Luke Atkin	TKO (strikes)	2	0:25	
Featherweight 66 kg	(United Kingdom) Gary Fox	vs.	(United Kingdom) Robbie Brown	Decision (unanimous)	5	2:00	Judges' scores not read.
Light heavyweight 84 kg	(United Kingdom) Conor Cooke	vs.	(United Kingdom) Nathan Owens	TKO (strikes)	3	1:12	
Cruiserweight 93 kg	(United Kingdom) Karl Thompson	vs.	(Poland) Dawid Oskar	Decision (unanimous)	5	2:00	Judges' scores not read.
Lightweight 70 kg	(Italy) Antonio Moscatiello	vs.	(Czech Republic) Hynek Hospodarsky	KO	1	1:58	
Preliminary Card
Welterweight 75 kg	(United Kingdom) Paul Cook	vs.	(United Kingdom) Luke Nevin	Decision (unanimous)	5	2:00	Judges' scores not read.
Welterweight 75 kg	(United Kingdom) Jonny Graham	vs.	(United Kingdom) Abel Radomski	TKO (strikes)	2	1:40	
Heavyweight 120 kg	(United Kingdom) Agi Faulkner	vs.	(United Kingdom) Rob Cunningham	TKO (strikes)	1	0:57	

== BKFC 56 Utah: Perry vs. Alvarez ==
BKFC 56 Utah: Perry vs. Alvarez
- Promotion: Bare Knuckle Fighting Championship
- Date: December 2, 2023
- Venue: Maverik Center
- City: (United States) Salt Lake City, Utah
- Attendance: 8,200

BKFC 56 Utah: Perry vs. Alvarez is a bare-knuckle fighting event being held by Bare Knuckle Fighting Championship on December 2, 2023.

=== Background ===
This event featured former UFC fighter Mike Perry against former UFC Lightweight champion Eddie Alvarez for the inaugural King of Violence Championship. This also had the bareknuckle debut of former UFC fighter Jeremy Stephens.

A Heavyweight bout between Ben Rothwell and Todd Duffee was scheduled for the co-main event. However, on November 30, it was announced the bout was cancelled due to Rothwell having an illness. The bout was rescheduled for BKFC: Knucklemania IV on April 27, 2024. A bout between Nick Rossborough and Kevin Brooks was cancelled prior to the event.

Bonus awards

The following fighters were awarded bonuses:

- Fights of the Night: Kai Stewart vs. Howard Davis and Esteban Rodriguez vs. Keegan Vandermeer
- Knockout of the Night: Mick Terrill

=== Results ===
BKFC 56 Utah: Perry vs. Alvarez
Weight Class				Method	Round	Time	Notes
Middleweight 79 kg	(United States) Mike Perry	def.	(United States) Eddie Alvarez	TKO (corner stoppage)	2	2:00	For the symbolic King of Violence Championship.
Flyweight 57 kg	(United States) Christine Ferea (c)	def.	(Australia) Bec Rawlings	Decision (unanimous) (50–45, 50–45, 50–45)	5	2:00	For the BKFC Women's Flyweight Championship.
Featherweight 66 kg	(United States) Kai Stewart (c)	def.	(United States) Howard Davis	Decision (unanimous) (49–46, 49–46, 48–47)	5	2:00	For the BKFC Featherweight Championship.
Heavyweight 120 kg	(England) Mick Terrill	def.	(United States) Arnold Adams	KO	4	0:47	For the vacant BKFC Heavyweight Championship.
Lightweight 70 kg	(United States) Jeremy Stephens	def.	(United States) Jimmie Rivera	TKO (doctor stoppage)	3	2:00	
Heavyweight 120 kg	(United States) Ben Moa	def.	(United States) Bridger Bercier	TKO (doctor stoppage)	3	0:51	
Light heavyweight 84 kg	(United States) Erick Lozano	def.	(United States) Mike Jones	TKO	3	0:55	
Preliminary Card
Cruiserweight 93 kg	(United States) Esteban Rodriguez	def.	(United States) Keegan Vandermeer	KO	2	1:06	
Welterweight 75 kg	(United States) Trevor Bradshaw	def.	(United States) Troy Dennison	KO	1	1:55	
Lightweight 70 kg	(United States) Danny Hilton	def.	(United States) LJ Schulz	TKO (doctor stoppage)	1	2:00	

== See also ==
- Bare Knuckle Fighting Championship
