= Bare Knuckle Fighting Championship =

Bare-knuckle boxing promoter

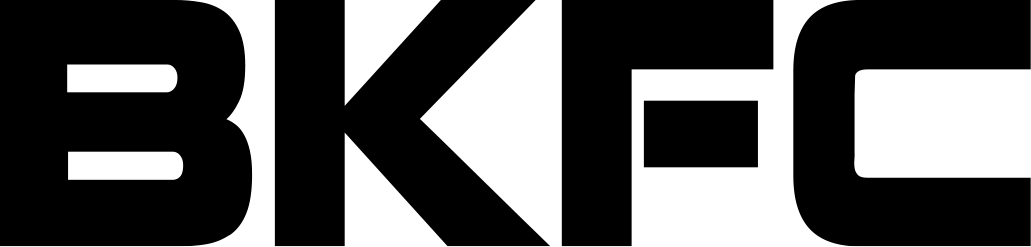
- Type: Private
- Industry: Bare-knuckle boxing promotion
- Founded: 2018
- Founder: David Feldman
- Headquarters: Philadelphia, Pennsylvania, U.S.
- Key people: David Feldman; Conor McGregor
- Owner: Triller, Inc
- Website: https://www.bareknuckle.tv

The Bare Knuckle Fighting Championship (BKFC) is an American bare-knuckle boxing promotion based in Philadelphia. The promotion was founded in April 2018, and is presided over by David Feldman. BKFC is the first promotion to hold an official state-sanctioned and commissioned bare-knuckle boxing event in the United States since 1889. Its first event was held in 2018, with 142 events held as of December 2025.

== History ==
BKFC's inaugural event, which took place on June 2, 2018, featured the first American-sanctioned, women's bare-knuckle fight in modern history. The Bare-Knuckle Boxing Hall of Fame recognized this milestone and awarded the victor of this contest, Bec Rawlings, with the National Police Gazette World Diamond Belt several days later. At BKFC 3, Arnold Adams defeated Sam Shewmaker in the finals of an eight-man tournament to be crowned as the inaugural BKFC Heavyweight Champion. This event also hosted the quarterfinals of a tournament to crown a Lightweight champion. In February 2019, former UFC light heavyweight title contender Anthony Johnson announced that he will be joining the company in an administrative role.

=== BKFC Thailand ===
On March 6, 2021, before the establishment of BKFC Thailand, BKFC organized BKFC: Bare Knuckle Kingdom in partnership with Full Metal Dojo in Thailand. In October 2021, Nick Chapman established Bare Knuckle Fighting Championship Thailand (BKFC Thailand). BKFC Thailand held its inaugural event on December 18, 2021, titled BKFC Thailand 1: The Game Changer, at the Pattaya Exhibition And Convention Hall (PEACH) in the Royal Cliff Hotels Group. The event featured former two-division WBC boxing champion Sirimongkol Singmanasak and future ONE Championship Muay Thai fighter Sinsamut Klinmee.

BKFC Thailand also had matches featuring a distinct ruleset called Bare Knuckle Thai Rules were similar to Muay Thai, with the notable exception that competitors fight without gloves. Matches consist of five rounds, with each round lasting two minutes. The rules permitted the use of kicks, punches, elbows, and knees, but explicitly prohibit trips and sweeps. Fighters had to remain active in a clinch, which lasts for three seconds. In the event of a draw, a sixth extension round was fought to determine a winner. In October 2023, BKFC Thailand signed a broadcasting deal with TrueVisions, where True Sports would air BKFC Thailand events. On November 4, 2023, BKFC Thailand held the first special rules Bare Knuckle Thai bout, featuring Muay Thai legends Buakaw Banchamek and Saenchai, at BKFC Thailand 5: Legends of Siam. The event became the first bare-knuckle boxing event to be aired on Thai television. As of July 2024, BKFC Thailand ceased operations, and is now defunct.

=== BKFC UK ===
In September 2022, it was announced that BKFC had acquired the UK-based Bare Fist Boxing Association (BFBA), forming Bare Knuckle Fighting Championship United Kingdom (BKFC UK). Before acquiring the Bare Fist Boxing Association and officially establishing BKFC UK, Bare Knuckle Fighting Championship made its debut in the United Kingdom with BKFC 27: London, which took place on 20 August 2022. The event was headlined by MMA veterans Mike Perry and Michael Page.

=== BKFC Prospects Series ===
In 2023, BKFC announced the launch of the BKFC Prospects Series. Fighters on the Prospects Series will compete in front of BKFC President David Feldman for a chance at a contract with BKFC; similar in format to Dana White's Contender Series, or the PFL Challenger Series in mixed martial arts. Competitors in the Prospects Series include previous participants at BKFC open tryouts, as well as athletes with backgrounds in boxing, Muay Thai, and mixed martial arts. The first edition of the BKFC Prospects Series premiered on August 24, 2023, in Miami, with six contracts being awarded.

In 2024, at the occasion of BKFC: Knucklemania IV, it was announced that Conor McGregor and his company "McGregor Sports and Entertainment" were now part owners of BKFC. On June 5, 2024, BKFC announced a talent-sharing program with the Japan-based Rizin Fighting Federation, in which both companies would allow talent fight in each other's organizations in bareknuckle bouts. At Super Rizin 3 on July 28, 2024, Charisa Sigala, Tai Emery, Takaki Soya, and John Dodson all fought in bareknuckle bouts on the undercard.

=== BKFC Ice Wars ===
In March 2025, Bare Knuckle Fighting Championship announced that it had acquired a stake in Ice Wars, an ice-fighting promotion founded by BKFC executive Charlie Nama, creating a new venture known as BKFC Ice Wars. The promotion was described as a hybrid of combat sports and ice hockey, staging regulated bare-knuckle fights on ice rather than as part of a hockey game.

The first BKFC Ice Wars event, Battle of the Borders, was scheduled for June 14, 2025, at Soaring Eagle Casino and Resort in Mt. Pleasant, Michigan, with fighters from the United States and Canada competing. A second event was scheduled for June 28, 2025, at River Cree Casino & Resort in Enoch, Alberta, Canada. BKFC Ice Wars planned at least six events in 2025, with expansion to as many as 24 events in 2026.

BKFC Ice Wars bouts are contested on a 900-square-foot ice surface known as “The Ice Box”. Under the announced rules, bouts consist of three to five rounds of up to 90 seconds each, with one-minute rest periods. Each bout is overseen by two referees and three judges, and fights that go the distance are scored as a whole rather than round-by-round. Judging criteria include effective striking, effective aggressiveness, and control of the fighting area.

=== Additional anouncements ===
On February 24, 2022, David Feldman announced on The MMA Hour that TrillerNet had acquired a majority stake of BKFC. At BKFC 26, on June 24, 2022, BKFC Lightweight Champion Luis Palomino won the Welterweight Championship to become the first double champion in BKFC history.

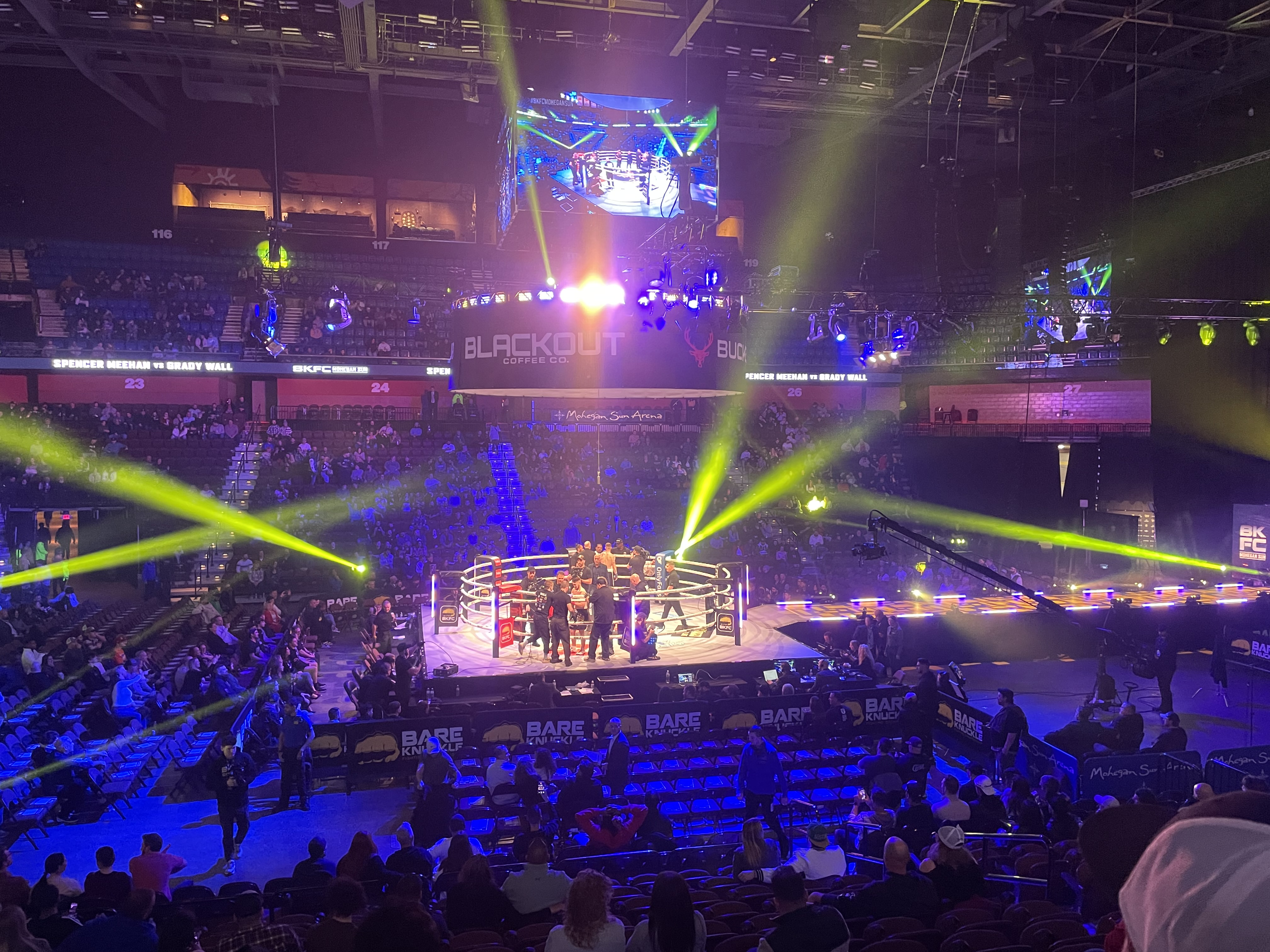
BKFC event at Mohegan Sun Arena, 2025

In July, 2025, Conor McGregor and David Feldman made a number announcements at the inaugural BKFC 2025 Champions Summit on Hollywood, Florida. The announcements included launching the BKFC’s World's Baddest Man $25 Million Tournament and acquiring majority shares in a Lethwei promotion in Asia. This new branch of BKFC was named "BKFC Lethwei" and headed by former BKFC Thailand CEO, Nick Chapman. In January 12, 2026, the promotion was renamed Lethwei Fighting Championship via fan voting. In 2026, it was announced that Nick Chapman and Lethwei Fighting Championship had parted ways with BKFC to operate as an independent promotion.

BKFC started doing "Fight Club" events from April 2026, small‑scale shows held in warehouse‑style venues with limited attendance, featuring competitors matched by similar weight and experience levels. All bouts are approved by the local athletic commission, and fighters are paired through a random draw shortly before competing. The promotion plans to stage one Fight Club event per month.

=== Blood4Blood ===
In 2026, Bare Knuckle Fighting Championship was involved in the launch of Blood4Blood, a hybrid live-event concept combining bare-knuckle boxing with heavy metal performances. The event was created by and featured Slaughter to Prevail vocalist Alex Terrible, and was produced by Danny Wimmer Presents in partnership with BKFC. The format was promoted as "4 Bands. 4 Brawls", pairing a four-fight bare-knuckle card with live performances from Slaughter to Prevail, Black Label Society, Crowbar and Malevolence.

The inaugural Blood4Blood event was held on May 6, 2026, at the Ocean Center in Daytona Beach, Florida. The main event featured Alex Terrible against Cameron Delano, with Delano winning by third-round technical knockout. Other bouts on the card included Jake Bostwick against Roderick Stewart, Taylor Starling against Sydney Smith, and Sergey Kalinin against Brock Walker.

== Rules ==
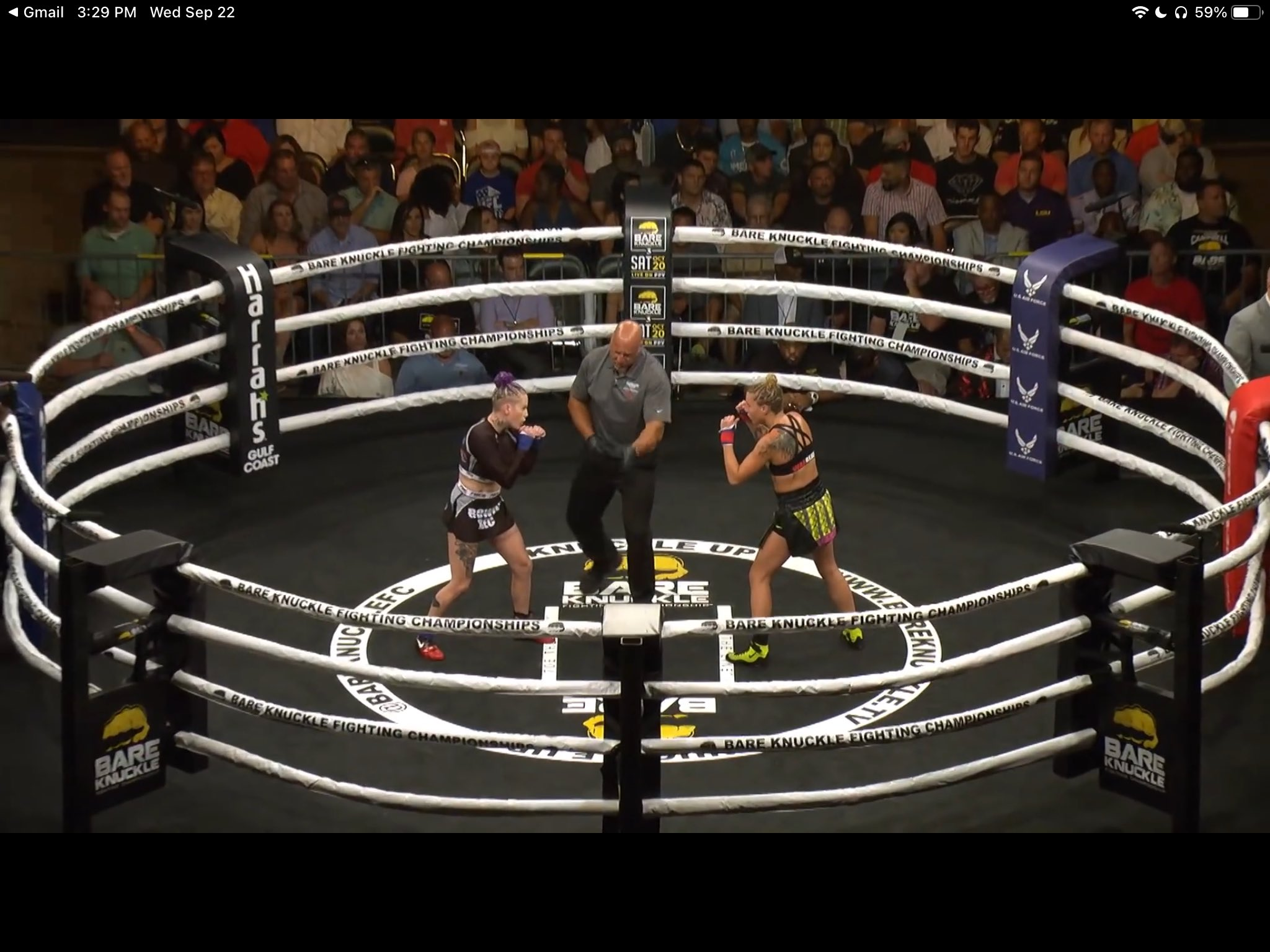
A BKFC "Squared Circle" ring.

BKFC holds all bouts in a circular four-rope ring, referred to as the "Squared Circle". This ring incorporates elements of historical bare knuckle fighting by containing two scratch lines, three feet apart and in the middle of the ring. These scratch lines are based on the Broughton Rules, which governed bare knuckle fighting in the 19th century. It is a requirement that each fighter must start each round with their front foot on their scratch line. This is referred to as “Toe the Line”, and it is an instruction given to the fighters at the beginning of each round, followed by "Knuckle Up" which signals the beginning of the round.

== Broadcasting partners ==
BKFC pay-per-view events were initially carried worldwide on FITE TV. On July 24, 2020, it was announced that DAZN would begin streaming BKFC events in August.

After the Triller acquisition, Fite announced in February 2023 that all BKFC events would be included for Fite+ subscribers.

On September 13, 2024, it was announced that BKFC and DAZN formed a three-year agreement which will allow DAZN to broadcast the BKFC events starting in October.

== List of BKFC events ==
#	Event	Date	Venue	Location	Ref
174	BKFC 97 Hollywood, FL: Henry vs. Collard	December 11, 2026	Seminole Hard Rock Hotel & Casino Hollywood	Hollywood, Florida	
173	BKFC Fight Night Hershey: Pague vs. Richman	December 4, 2026	Giant Center	Hershey, Pennsylvania	
172	BKFC Fight Night Myrtle Beach: Richardson vs. Oxendine	November 20, 2026	John T. Rhodes Myrtle Beach Sports Center	Myrtle Beach, South Carolina	
171	BKFC 96 Glasgow: Cooke vs. Weir	November 7, 2026	OVO Hydro	Glasgow, Scotland	
170	BKFC Fight Night Clearwater: Reber vs. Street	October 23, 2026	OCC Road House	Clearwater, Florida	
169	BKFC 95 Newark: Herring vs. Dodson	October 17, 2026	Prudential Center	Newark, New Jersey	
—	BKFC Fight Night Belgrade: Faulkner vs. Prašović	October 17, 2026 (Postponed)	Belgrade Arena	Belgrade, Serbia	
168	BKFC Fight Night Betheleham: Cisneros vs. Petersen	October 9, 2026	Wind Creek Event Center	Bethlehem, Pennsylvania	
167	BKFC Fight Night Australia: Kuhne vs. Curran	October 3, 2026	Eatons Hills Hotel	Queensland, Australia	
166	BKFC 94 Manchester: Till vs. Romero	September 26, 2026	Manchester Arena	Manchester, England	
165	BKFC 93 Hollywood: Perdomo vs. Hill	September 11, 2026	Seminole Hard Rock Hotel & Casino Hollywood	Hollywood, Florida	
164	BKFC 92 Boston: Stewart vs. Gigliotti	August 29, 2026	Fenway Park	Boston, Massachusetts	
163	BKFC Fight Night Mohegan Sun: Henry vs. Trinidad	August 21, 2026	Mohegan Sun Arena	Uncasville, Connecticut	
162	BKFC Fight Night Sturgis: Acheson vs. Jones	August 8, 2026	Buffalo Chip Campground	Sturgis, South Dakota	
161	BKFC Fight Night Newcastle: Garside vs. Taylor	August 1, 2026	Walker Activity Dome	Newcastle upon Tyne, England	
160	BKFC Fight Night Uruguay: Reyno vs. Krejci	July 25, 2026	Antel Arena	Montevideo, Uruguay	
159	BKFC 91 Naples: Hunt vs. Pugliesi	July 18, 2026	Arena Flegrea	Naples, Italy	
158	BKFC Liberty Brawl	July 3, 2026	Xfinity Mobile Arena	Philadelphia, Pennsylvania	
157	BKFC Fight Night Hammond: VanCamp vs. Cisneros	June 26, 2026	Horseshoe Hammond	Hammond, Indiana	
156	BKFC Fight Night Nashville: Soto vs. Deleon	June 19, 2026	The Pinnacle	Nashville, Tennessee	
155	BKFC Fight Night Hollywood: Lane vs. Henry	June 4, 2026	Seminole Hard Rock Hotel & Casino Hollywood	Hollywood, Florida	
154	BKFC 90 Birmingham: Tierney vs. Franco	May 30, 2026	Utilita Arena Birmingham	Birmingham, England	
153	BKFC 89 Palm Desert: Herring vs. Larrimore	May 22, 2026	Acrisure Arena	Thousand Palms, California	
152	BKFC Blood 4 Blood	May 6, 2026	Ocean Center	Daytona Beach, Florida	
151	BKFC Fight Night Clearwater: Gaskins vs. Guymon	April 25, 2026	OCC Road House	Clearwater, Florida	
150	BKFC Fight Night Australia: Hepi vs. Wiśniewski 2	April 18, 2026	Townsville Entertainment and Convention Centre	Townsville, Australia	
149	BKFC 88 Denver: Camozzi vs. Rodrigueze	April 17, 2026	National Western Center	Denver, Colorado	
148	BKFC Fight Night Honolulu: Pitolo vs. Coltrane	April 11, 2026	Blaisdell Center	Honolulu, Hawaii	
147	BKFC Fight Night Mohegan Sun: Porter vs. Watson	March 28, 2026	Mohegan Sun Arena	Uncasville, Connecticut	
146	BKFC 87 Hollywood, FL: Stewart vs. Gaffie	March 20, 2026	Seminole Hard Rock Hotel & Casino Hollywood	Hollywood, Florida	
145	BKFC Fight Night Newcastle: Terrill vs. McFarlane	March 14, 2026	Utilita Arena Newcastle	Newcastle, England	
144	BKFC Knucklemania VI	February 7, 2026	Xfinity Mobile Arena	Philadelphia, Pennsylvania	
143	BKFC 86 Mohegan Sun: Lane vs. Pague	January 17, 2026	Mohegan Sun Arena	Uncasville, Connecticut	
142	BKFC Fight Night Mohegan Sun: Porter vs. Copeland	December 20, 2025	Mohegan Sun Arena	Uncasville, Connecticut	
141	BKFC Fight Night Derby: Cooke vs. Holmes	December 13, 2025	Vaillant Live	Derby, England	
140	BKFC 86 Hollywood, FL: Trout vs. Palomino 2	December 5, 2025	Seminole Hard Rock Hotel & Casino Hollywood	Hollywood, Florida	
139	BKFC 84 Palm Desert: Dyer vs. Hunt 2	November 15, 2025	Acrisure Arena	Thousand Palms, California	
138	BKFC Fight Night Michigan: Rodriguez vs. Cavender	November 1, 2025	Soaring Eagle Casino	Mount Pleasant, Michigan	
137	BKFC 83 Italy: Camozzi vs. Sakara	October 25, 2025	Palazzetto dello Sport	Rome, Italy	
136	BKFC Fight Night Hammond: Henry vs. Stewart	October 18, 2025	Horseshoe Hammond	Hammond, Indiana	
135	BKFC 82 Newark: Perry vs. Stephens	October 4, 2025	Prudential Center	Newark, New Jersey	
134	BKFC 81 Manchester: DeGale vs. Floyd	September 27, 2025	AO Arena	Manchester, England	
133	BKFC 80 Hollywood, FL: Perdomo vs. Adams 2	September 12, 2025	Seminole Hard Rock Hotel & Casino Hollywood	Hollywood, Florida	
132	BKFC Fight Night Montenegro: Bakočević vs. Ott	August 30, 2025	Top Hill	Budva, Montenegro	
131	BKFC Fight Night Edmonton: Stuve vs. Manno	August 9, 2025	River Cree Resort and Casino	Enoch, Alberta, Canada	
130	BKFC 79 Sturgis: Gogo vs. Lane	August 5, 2025	Buffalo Chip Campground	Sturgis, South Dakota	
129	BKFC Fight Night Philly: Pague vs. Petersen	July 25, 2025	2300 Arena	Philadelphia, Pennsylvania	
128	BKFC 78 Hollywood, FL: Perdomo vs. Adams	July 12, 2025	Seminole Hard Rock Hotel & Casino Hollywood	Hollywood, Florida	
127	BKFC 77 Birmingham: Tierney vs. Christie	June 28, 2025	bp pulse LIVE	Birmingham, England	
126	BKFC 76 Texas: Tenaglia vs. Soto	June 21, 2025	Dickies Arena	Fort Worth, Texas	
125	BKFC Fight Night Mohegan Sun: Porter vs. Cleckler	June 14, 2025	Mohegan Sun Arena	Uncasville, Connecticut	
124	BKFC 75 Albuquerque: Mundell vs. Sanchez	June 6, 2025	Tingley Coliseum	Albuquerque, New Mexico	
123	BKFC 74 Salt Lake City: Richman vs. Dyer	May 11, 2025	Maverik Center	West Valley City, Utah	
122	BKFC Fight Night Clearwater: Warren vs. Creer	May 2, 2025	OCC Road House & Museum	Clearwater, Florida	
121	BKFC 73 Italy: Camozzi vs. Bicchi	April 26, 2025	Palazzo Wanny	Florence, Italy	
120	BKFC Fight Night Omaha: Cochrane vs. Edwards	April 18, 2025	The Astro	Omaha, Nebraska	
119	BKFC 72 Dubai Day 2: Stewart vs. Strydom	April 5, 2025	Dubai Tennis Stadium	Dubai, United Arab Emirates	
118	BKFC 71 Dubai Day 1: Trout vs. Trinidad-Snake	April 4, 2025	Dubai Tennis Stadium	Dubai, United Arab Emirates	
117	BKFC Fight Night Manchester: Chipchase vs. Fox	March 29, 2025	Planet Ice	Altrincham, England	
116	BKFC 70 Hollywood, FL: Palomino vs. Davis	March 27, 2025	Seminole Hard Rock Hotel & Casino Hollywood	Hollywood, Florida	
115	BKFC Fight Night Philly: Pague vs. Angelcor	March 21, 2025	2300 Arena	Philadelphia, Pennsylvania	
114	BKFC Fight Night Albuquerque: Richardson vs. Usmanov	February 28, 2025	Kiva Auditorium	Albuquerque, New Mexico	
113	BKFC Fight Night Newcastle: Thompson vs. Boardman	February 8, 2025	Walker Activity Dome	Newcastle, England	
112	BKFC on DAZN Mohegan Sun: Lane vs. VanCamp	February 1, 2025	Mohegan Sun Arena	Uncasville, Connecticut	
111	BKFC Knucklemania V	January 25, 2025	Wells Fargo Center	Philadelphia, Pennsylvania	
110	BKFC Fight Night Pechanga: Kurdanov vs. Brito	January 18, 2025	Pechanga Resort Casino	Temecula, California	
109	BKFC on DAZN Hollywood, FL: Warren vs. Richman	December 21, 2024	Seminole Hard Rock Hotel & Casino Hollywood	Hollywood, Florida	
108	BKFC 69 Atlanta: Richardson vs. Larrimore	December 6, 2024	Gas South Arena	Duluth, Georgia	
107	BKFC Fight Night Los Angeles: Warr vs. Khanakov	November 23, 2024	Thunder Studios	Los Angeles, California	
106	BKFC on DAZN Montana: Stewart vs. Rivera	November 9, 2024	First Interstate Arena	Billings, Montana	
105	BKFC 68 Newcastle: Faulkner vs. Oscar	November 2, 2024	Utilita Arena Newcastle	Newcastle, England	
104	BKFC Fight Night Prospects: Myrtle Beach	October 26, 2024	John T. Rhodes Myrtle Beach Sports Center	Myrtle Beach, South Carolina	
103	BKFC 67 Denver: Camozzi vs. Depee	October 25, 2024	Denver Coliseum	Denver, Colorado	
102	BKFC on DAZN: Tenaglia vs. Soto	October 12, 2024	Marbella Arena	Marbella, Spain	
101	BKFC 66 Hollywood, FL: Blas vs. Reber	September 13, 2024	Seminole Hard Rock Hotel & Casino Hollywood	Hollywood, Florida	
100	BKFC 65 Salt Lake City: Ferea vs. Masson-Wong	September 6, 2024	Maverik Center	Salt Lake City, Utah	
99	BKFC Fight Night Prospects: Edmonton	August 31, 2024	River Cree Resort and Casino	Enoch, Alberta, Canada	
98	BKFC Fight Night Kansas City: Lindsay vs. Brito	August 16, 2024	Memorial Hall	Kansas City, Kansas	
97	BKFC 64 Coventry: Tierney vs. Graham	August 10, 2024	Coventry Skydome	Coventry, England	
96	BKFC 63 Sturgis: Hart vs. Starling	August 3, 2024	Buffalo Chip Campground	Sturgis, South Dakota	
95	BKFC Fight Night Pechanga: Peralta vs. Warr	July 12, 2024	Pechanga Resort and Casino	Temecula, California	
94	BKFC 62 Hollywood, FL: Stewart vs. Duran	June 21, 2024	Seminole Hard Rock Hotel & Casino Hollywood	Hollywood, Florida	
93	BKFC Fight Night Prospects: Newcastle	June 8, 2024	Walker Activity Dome	Newcastle, England	
92	BKFC Fight Night Prospects: Denver	May 31, 2024	National Western Center	Denver, Colorado	
91	BKFC Fight Night Puebla, Mexico: Rubio vs Rey Gallegos	May 25, 2024	Auditorio Explanada Pachuca	Puebla, Mexico	
90	BKFC Fight Night Omaha: Trinidad-Snake vs. Pague	May 17, 2024	Liberty First Credit Union Arena	Omaha, Nebraska	
89	BKFC 61 Connecticut: Rivera vs. Straus	May 11, 2024	Mohegan Sun Arena	Uncasville, Connecticut	
88	BKFC: Knucklemania IV	April 27, 2024	Peacock Theater	Los Angeles, California	
87	BKFC Fight Night Clearwater: Richman vs. Lozano	April 12, 2024	Bert's Barracuda Harley-Davidson	Clearwater, Florida	
86	BKFC 60 Milton Keynes: Lilley vs. Tenaglia	April 6, 2024	Planet Ice Arena Milton Keynes	Milton Keynes, England	
85	BKFC 59 Albuquerque: Dodson vs. Aguero	March 29, 2024	Tingley Coliseum	Albuquerque, New Mexico	
84	BKFC 58 Bulgaria: Markulev vs. Kolev	March 22, 2024	Arena Sofia	Sofia, Bulgaria	
83	BKFC Fight Night Miami: Davis vs. Wilson	March 15, 2024	Dolphin Mall	Miami, Florida	
82	BKFC Fight Night Prospects: Canada	March 3, 2024	River Cree Resort and Casino	Enoch, Alberta, Canada	
81	BKFC Fight Night Prospects: Manassas	February 16, 2024	The Salisbury Center	Manassas, Virginia	
80	BKFC 57: Palomino vs. Trout	February 2, 2024	Seminole Hard Rock Hotel & Casino Hollywood	Hollywood, Florida	
79	BKFC Fight Night Prospects: Albuquerque	January 27, 2024	Revel Arena	Albuquerque, New Mexico	
78	BKFC 56 Utah: Perry vs. Alvarez	December 2, 2023	Maverik Center	West Valley City, Utah	
77	BKFC 55 Leeds: Christie vs. Warren	November 18, 2023	Planet Ice Leeds	Leeds, England	
76	BKFC 54 Bulgaria: Dimitrov vs. Zhelyakov	November 17, 2023	Arena Sofia	Sofia, Bulgaria	
75	BKFC Thailand 5: Legends of Siam	November 4, 2023	Royal Cliff Beach Hotel Pattaya	Pattaya, Thailand	
74	BKFC 53 Orlando: Mundell vs. Coltrane	November 3, 2023	Orange County Convention Center	Orlando, Florida	
73	BKFC 52 South Carolina: Barnett vs. Richardson	October 20, 2023	Colonial Life Arena	Columbia, South Carolina	
72	BKFC Prospects Series 2	October 14, 2023	Liverpool Olympia	Liverpool, England	
71	BKFC 51 Salem: Hart vs. Shah	September 29, 2023	Salem Civic Center	Salem, Virginia	
70	BKFC 50 Denver: Hunt vs. Camozzi	September 22, 2023	1stBank Center	Broomfield, Colorado	
69	BKFC 49 Miami: Slaveski vs. Lindsey	August 25, 2023	Miami-Dade County Fairgrounds	Miami, Florida	
68	BKFC Prospects Series 1	August 24, 2023	Miami-Dade County Fairgrounds	Miami, Florida	
67	BKFC 48 Albuquerque: Dodson vs. Ridge	August 11, 2023	Tingley Coliseum	Albuquerque, New Mexico	
66	BKFC 47 Lakeland: Mundell vs. Richman	July 14, 2023	RP Funding Center	Lakeland, Florida	
65	BKFC 46 Newcastle: Franco vs. Harris	July 1, 2023	Walker Activity Dome	Newcastle, England	
64	BKFC 45 Hollywood, FL: Palomino vs. Lilley	June 23, 2023	Seminole Hard Rock Hotel & Casino Hollywood	Hollywood, Florida	
63	BKFC 44 Montana: Stewart vs. Lopez	June 9, 2023	Four Seasons Arena	Great Falls, Montana	
62	BKFC 43 Omaha: Alexander vs. Smith	May 19, 2023	Liberty First Credit Union Arena	Omaha, Nebraska	
61	BKFC 42 Greenville: Soto vs. Goodjohn	May 12, 2023	Bon Secours Wellness Arena	Greenville, South Carolina	
60	BKFC 41 Colorado: Perry vs. Rockhold	April 29, 2023	1stBank Center	Broomfield, Colorado	
59	BKFC 40 Leeds: Holmes vs. Christie	April 22, 2023	Planet Ice Leeds	Leeds, England	
58	BKFC 38 Delray Beach: Nguyen vs. Straus	April 21, 2023	Delray Beach Tennis Center	Delray Beach, Florida	
57	BKFC 39 Norfolk: Barnett vs. Alvarez	March 24, 2023	Norfolk Scope	Norfolk, Virginia	
56	BKFC 37 London: Tierney vs. Lindsey	March 4, 2023	Crystal Palace National Sports Centre	London, England	
55	BKFC 36 New Orleans: Adams vs. Belcher	February 24, 2023	Pontchartrain Center	Kenner, Louisiana	
54	BKFC KnuckleMania 3	February 17, 2023	Tingley Coliseum	Albuquerque, New Mexico	
53	BKFC 35 Myrtle Beach: Cedeno vs. Slaveski	January 27, 2023	John T. Rhodes Sports Center	Myrtle Beach, South Carolina	
52	BKFC Asia 4: The Big Bash	December 10, 2022	SpacePlus Bangkok RCA	Bangkok, Thailand	
51	BKFC 34 Hollywood, FL: Palomino vs. Shoaff	December 3, 2022	Seminole Hard Rock Hotel & Casino Hollywood	Hollywood, Florida	
50	BKFC Fight Night Newcastle: Terrill vs. Banks	November 26, 2022	Walker Activity Dome	Newcastle, England	
49	BKFC 33 Omaha: Beltran vs. Alexander	November 18, 2022	Liberty First Credit Union Arena	Omaha, Nebraska	
48	BKFC 32 Orlando: Barnett vs. Herrera	November 5, 2022	Caribe Royale	Orlando, Florida	
47	BKFC 31 Denver: Richman vs. Doolittle	October 15, 2022	1stBank Center	Broomfield, Colorado	
46	BKFC 30 Monroe: Hunt vs. Henry	October 1, 2022	Fant-Ewing Coliseum	Monroe, Louisiana	
45	BKFC 29 Montana 2: Hart vs. Sigala	September 10, 2022	Pacific Steel & Recycling Arena	Great Falls, Montana	
44	BKFC Thailand 3: Moment of Truth	September 3, 2022	CentralWorld	Bangkok, Thailand	
43	BKFC 28 Albuquerque: Ferea vs. Starling	August 27, 2022	Rio Rancho Events Center	Albuquerque, New Mexico	
42	BKFC 27 London: MVP vs. Platinum	August 20, 2022	Wembley Arena	London, England	
41	BKFC Fight Night Tampa 2: Grant vs. Barnett	July 23, 2022	Florida State Fairgrounds	Tampa, Florida	
40	BKFC 26 Hollywood, FL: Brito vs. Palomino	June 24, 2022	Seminole Hard Rock Hotel & Casino Hollywood	Hollywood, Florida	
39	BKFC Fight Night: Jackson 2: Belcher vs. Tate	June 11, 2022	Jackson Convention Complex	Jackson, Mississippi	
38	BKFC Fight Night Omaha: Cochrane vs. Dyer	May 13, 2022	Liberty First Credit Union Arena	Omaha, Nebraska	
37	BKFC Thailand 2: Iconic Impact	May 7, 2022	Royal Cliff Beach Hotel Pattaya	Pattaya, Thailand	
36	BKFC 25: Adams vs. Cleckler	May 6, 2022	Caribe Royale Orlando	Orlando, Florida	
35	BKFC 24: Hunt vs. Riggs	April 30, 2022	Montana ExpoPark	Great Falls, Montana	
34	BKFC Fight Night: Ft. Lauderdale: Beltran vs. Tate	April 21, 2022	Charles F. Dodge City Center	Pembroke Pines, Florida	
33	BKFC 23: Richman vs. Rickels	April 8, 2022	Intrust Bank Arena	Wichita, Kansas	
32	BKFC Fight Night New York 2: Grant vs. Retic	March 12, 2022	Seneca Allegany Casino	Salamanca, New York	
31	BKFC KnuckleMania 2	February 19, 2022	Seminole Hard Rock Hotel & Casino Hollywood	Hollywood, Florida	
30	BKFC Fight Night Jackson: Brito vs. Harris II	January 29, 2022	Jackson Convention Complex	Jackson, Mississippi	
29	BKFC Thailand 1: The Game Changer	December 18, 2021	Royal Cliff Beach Hotel Pattaya	Pattaya, Thailand	
28	BKFC Fight Night Tampa: Brown vs. Taylor	December 9, 2021	Seminole Hard Rock Hotel and Casino Tampa	Tampa, Florida	
27	BKFC 22 Miami: Lombard vs. Hunt	November 12, 2021	James L. Knight Center	Miami, Florida	
26	BKFC Fight Night New York: Beltran vs. Adams	November 6, 2021	Seneca Allegany Casino	Salamanca, New York	
25	BKFC Fight Night Wichita: Rickels vs. Lane	October 23, 2021	Hartman Arena	Park City, Kansas	
24	BKFC Fight Night Montana: Riggs vs. Guillard	October 9, 2021	First Interstate Arena	Billings, Montana	
23	BKFC 21: Cochrane vs. Burns	September 10, 2021	Ralston Arena	Omaha, Nebraska	
22	BKFC 20: Bedford vs. Barnett	August 20, 2021	Mississippi Coast Coliseum	Biloxi, Mississippi	
21	BKFC 19: VanZant vs. Ostovich	July 23, 2021	Florida State Fairgrounds	Tampa, Florida	
20	BKFC 18: Beltran vs. Shewmaker	June 26, 2021	Seminole Hard Rock Hotel & Casino Hollywood	Hollywood, Florida	
19	BKFC 17: Tate vs. Burns	April 30, 2021	Boutwell Memorial Auditorium	Birmingham, Alabama	
18	BKFC 16: Garcia vs. Elmore	March 19, 2021	Biloxi Civic Center	Biloxi, Mississippi	
17	BKFC: Bare Knuckle Kingdom	March 6, 2021	The Sea Galleri	Phuket, Thailand	
16	BKFC Knucklemania	February 5, 2021	RP Funding Center	Lakeland, Florida	
15	BKFC 15: O'Bannon vs. Shewmaker	December 11, 2020	Mississippi Coast Coliseum	Biloxi, Mississippi	
14	BKFC 14: Palomino vs. Alers	November 13, 2020	InterContinental Miami	Miami, Florida	
13	BKFC 13: Beltran vs. Stamps	October 10, 2020	Tony's Pizza Events Center	Salina, Kansas	
12	BKFC 12: Alves vs. Lane	September 11, 2020	Ocean Center	Daytona Beach, Florida	
11	BKFC 11: Vallie-Flagg vs. Palomino	July 24, 2020	Lafayette County Multipurpose Arena	Oxford, Mississippi	
10	BKFC 10: Lombard vs. Mundell	February 15, 2020	Broward County Convention Center	Fort Lauderdale, Florida	
9	BKFC 9: Lobov vs. Knight II	November 16, 2019	Mississippi Coast Coliseum	Biloxi, Mississippi	
8	BKFC 8: Silva vs. Gonzaga	October 19, 2019	Florida State Fairgrounds	Tampa, Florida	
7	BKFC 7: Alers vs. Garcia	August 10, 2019	Mississippi Coast Coliseum	Biloxi, Mississippi	
6	BKFC 6: Malignaggi vs. Lobov	June 22, 2019	Florida State Fairgrounds	Tampa, Florida	
5	BKFC 5: Lobov vs. Knight	April 6, 2019	Mississippi Coast Coliseum	Biloxi, Mississippi	
4	BKFC 4: USA vs Mexico	February 2, 2019	Beto Ávila Stadium	Cancun, Mexico	
3	BKFC 3: Adams vs. Shewmaker	October 20, 2018	Mississippi Coast Coliseum	Biloxi, Mississippi	
2	BKFC 2: A New Era	August 25, 2018	Mississippi Coast Coliseum	Biloxi, Mississippi	
1	BKFC 1: The Beginning	June 2, 2018	Cheyenne Ice and Events Center	Cheyenne, Wyoming	

List of BKFC events

- 2026 in Bare Knuckle Fighting Championship
- 2025 in Bare Knuckle Fighting Championship
- 2024 in Bare Knuckle Fighting Championship
- 2023 in Bare Knuckle Fighting Championship
- 2022 in Bare Knuckle Fighting Championship
- 2021 in Bare Knuckle Fighting Championship
- 2020 in Bare Knuckle Fighting Championship
- 2019 in Bare Knuckle Fighting Championship
- 2018 in Bare Knuckle Fighting Championship

== BKFC weight classes ==
Division	Upper weight limit	Gender
Heavyweight	Unlimited	Male
Ironweight	225 lb (102 kg)	Male
Cruiserweight	205 lb (93 kg)	Male
Light heavyweight	185 lb (84 kg)	Male
Middleweight	175 lb (79 kg)	Male
Welterweight	165 lb (75 kg)	Male
Lightweight	155 lb (70 kg)	Male
Featherweight	145 lb (66 kg)	Male
Bantamweight	135 lb (61 kg)	Male
Flyweight	125 lb (57 kg)	Male / Female
Strawweight	115 lb (52 kg)	Female

== Current champions ==
BKFC World Champions
Division	Champion	Since	Defenses
Heavyweight	(Belarus) Andrei Arlovski	February 7, 2026	0
Ironweight	(United States) Lorenzo Hunt	July 18, 2026	0
Cruiserweight	(Italy) Alessio Sakara	October 25, 2025	0
Light heavyweight	(United States) Lorenzo Hunt	Nov 15, 2025	0
Middleweight
Middleweight	(United States) David Mundell	December 3, 2022	4
Welterweight	(United States) Dustin Pague	January 17, 2026	0
Lightweight	(United Kingdom) Ben Bonner	June 21, 2025	0
Featherweight	(United States) Kai Stewart	June 9, 2023	6
Bantamweight	(United States) Jamel Herring	May 22, 2026	1
Flyweight	(United States) John Dodson	August 11, 2023	1
King of Streets	(Peru) Luis Palomino	March 27, 2025	0
Women's Featherweight	(United States) Jessica Borga	April 5, 2025	0
Women's Flyweight	(United States) Christine Ferea	February 19, 2022	5
Women's Strawweight	(United States) Britain Hart	September 10, 2022	5

Police Gazette Champions
Division	Champion	Since	Defenses
World Heavyweight	(United States) Arnold Adams	November 6, 2021	1
World Light Heavyweight	(United States) Lorenzo Hunt	October 10, 2020	1
World Middleweight	(Wales) Barrie Jones	April 10, 2021	0
World Welterweight	(Puerto Rico) Elvin Brito	January 9, 2022	0
World Lightweight	(Peru) Luis Palomino	July 24, 2020	4
World Bantamweight	(United States) Johnny Bedford	August 20, 2021	0
World Women's Bantamweight	(United States) Patricia Juarez	May 28, 2022	0
World Women's Flyweight	(United States) Christine Ferea	February 19, 2022	0

BKFC Thailand Champions
Division	Champion	Since	Defenses
Light Heavyweight	(Thailand) Sirimongkol Singmanasak	May 7, 2022	0
Featherweight	(Thailand) Krisana Srisang	November 4, 2023	0
Women's Strawweight	(Thailand) Po Denman	November 4, 2023	0

BKFC UK Champions
Division	Champion	Since	Defenses
Heavyweight	(United Kingdom) Mick Terrill	March 14, 2026	0
Light Heavyweight	(United Kingdom) Sean Weir	November 7, 2026	0
Cruiserweight	(United Kingdom) Karl Thompson	February 8, 2025	1
Welterweight	(United Kingdom) Rico Franco	May 30, 2026	0
Lightweight	(United Kingdom) Jonny Graham	September 27, 2025	0
Featherweight	(United Kingdom) Gary Fox	March 29, 2025	0
Bantamweight	(United Kingdom) Bradley Taylor	August 1, 2025	0

BKFC Europe Champions
Division	Champion	Since	Defenses
Heavyweight	(United Kingdom) Agi Faulkner	November 2, 2024	0
Cruiserweight	(Czech Republic) Jindrich Byrtus	July 18, 2026	0
Light Heavyweight	(Slovakia) Tomas Melis	July 18, 2026	0
Middleweight	(Czech Republic) Josef Hala	October 25, 2025	0
Welterweight	(United Kingdom) Rico Franco	April 26, 2025	0
Featherweight	(Spain) Nico Gaffie	October 25, 2025	0

== Men's championship history ==
=== Heavyweight Championship ===
Weight limit: above 230 lbs (104.3 kg)
The inaugural champion was determined by an 8-man tournament.
From July 18, 2026, the Heavyweight Championship limit changed from above 210 lbs to above 230 lbs due to the introduction of the "Ironweight Championship"

No.	Name	Event	Date	Defenses
1	(United States) Arnold Adams def. Sam Shewmaker	BKFC 3 Biloxi, Mississippi	October 20, 2018	
2	(United States) Chase Sherman	BKFC 7 Biloxi, Mississippi	August 10, 2019	
3	(United States) Joey Beltran	BKFC 9 Biloxi, Mississippi	November 16, 2019	1. def. Marcel Stamps at BKFC 13 on October 10, 2020; 2. def. Sam Shewmaker at BKFC 18 on June 26, 2021
4	(United States) Arnold Adams (2)	BKFC Fight Night 3 Salamanca, New York	November 6, 2021	1. def. Dillon Cleckler at BKFC 25 on May 6, 2022
5	(United States) Alan Belcher	BKFC 36: Adams vs. Belcher; Kenner, Louisiana	February 24, 2023	
Belcher was stripped of the title in June 2023 after he accepted a boxing fight outside the organization against Chase DeMoor
6	(England) Mick Terrill def. Arnold Adams	BKFC 56; Salt Lake City, Utah	December 2, 2023	1. def. Lorenzo Hunt at BKFC: Knucklemania IV on April 27, 2024
7	(United States) Ben Rothwell	BKFC Knucklemania V Philadelphia, Pennsylvania	January 25, 2025	
8	(Belarus) Andrei Arlovski	BKFC Knucklemania VI; Philadelphia, Pennsylvania	February 7, 2026	

=== Ironweight Championship ===
Weight limit: 230 lbs (104.3 kg)

No.	Name	Event	Date	Defenses
1	(United States) Lorenzo Hunt def. Walter Pugliesi	BKFC 91; Naples, Italy	July 18, 2026	

=== Cruiserweight Championship ===
Weight limit: 210 lbs (95.3 kg)

No.	Name	Event	Date	Defenses
1	(Australia) Héctor Lombard def. Joe Riggs	BKFC 18; Miami, Florida	June 26, 2021	
The Cruiserweight title was vacated.
2	(United States) Lorenzo Hunt def. Quentin Henry	BKFC 30; Monroe, Louisiana	October 1, 2022	1. def. Chris Camozzi at BKFC 50 on September 22, 2023
The Cruiserweight title was vacated.
3	(United States) Chris Camozzi def. Sawyer Depee	BKFC 67; Denver, Colorado	October 25, 2024	1. def. Andrea Bicchi at BKFC 73 on April 26, 2025
4	(Italy) Alessio Sakara	BKFC 83; Rome, Italy	October 25, 2025	
-	(United States) Esteban Rodriguez def. Chris Camozzi for interim title	BKFC 31; Denver, Colorado	April 17, 2026	

=== Light Heavyweight Championship ===
Weight limit: 190 lbs (86.2 kg)

No.	Name	Event	Date	Defenses
1	(United States) Lorenzo Hunt def. Héctor Lombard	BKFC 22; Miami, Florida	November 12, 2021	1. def. Joe Riggs at BKFC 24 on April 30, 2022; 2. def. interim champion Mike Richman at KnuckleMania 3 on February 17, 2023
-	(United States) Mike Richman def. Isaac Doolittle for interim title	BKFC 31; Broomfield, Colorado	October 15, 2022	
Josh Dyer and Jared Warren fought to a No-Contest on July 14, 2023, at BKFC 47 for the BKFC Light Heavyweight interim title.
Lorenzo Hunt vacated his undisputed Light Heavyweight title to challenge for the Heavyweight title.
2	(United States) Jared Warren def. Jomi Escoboza	BKFC 62; Hollywood, Florida	June 21, 2024	
3	(United States) Mike Richman	BKFC on DAZN 3 Hollywood, Florida	December 21, 2024	
4	(United States) Josh Dyer	BKFC 74; West Valley City, Utah	May 10, 2025	
5	(United States) Lorenzo Hunt (2)	BKFC 84; Thousand Palms, California	November 15, 2025	

=== Middleweight Championship ===
Weight limit: 175 lbs (79.3 kg)

No.	Name	Event	Date	Defenses
1	(Brazil) Thiago Alves def. Ulysses Diaz	BKFC 18; Miami, Florida	June 26, 2021	
Alves was stripped of the title in June 2022 after he and the organization were not able to reach agreement on new contract.
-	(Italy) Francesco Ricchi def. Ulysses Diaz for the interim title	BKFC 26; Hollywood, Florida	June 24, 2022	
2	(United States) David Mundell def. Francesco Ricchi for undisputed title	BKFC 34; Hollywood, Florida	December 3, 2022	1. def. Mike Richman at BKFC 47 on July 14, 2023; 2. def. Doug Coltrane at BKFC 53 on November 3, 2023; 3. def. Danny Christie at BKFC on DAZN on October 12, 2024; 4. def. Donald Sanchez at BKFC 75 on June 6, 2025

=== Welterweight Championship ===
Weight limit: 165 lbs (74.8 kg)

No.	Name	Event	Date	Defenses
1	(Puerto Rico) Elvin Brito def. Kaleb Harris	BKFC Fight Night 5 Jackson, Mississippi	January 29, 2022	
2	(Peru) Luis Palomino	BKFC 26; Hollywood, Florida	June 24, 2022	
The Welterweight title was vacated.
3	(North Macedonia) Gorjan Slaveski def. Jake Lindsey	BKFC 49	August 25, 2023	
Slaveski was stripped of the title on December 14, 2023, after he accepted a karate fight against Brandon Jenkins without the permission of BKFC.
4	(United States) Austin Trout def. Luis Palomino	BKFC 57; Hollywood, California	February 2, 2024	1. def. Ricardo Franco at BKFC on DAZN on October 12, 2024; 2. def. Carlos Trinidad-Snake at BKFC 71 on April 4, 2025
For unknown reasons, it was reported that the title was vacated from Trout in June 2025.
5	(United States) Julian Lane def. Gorjan Slaveski	BKFC 79; Sturgis, South Dakota	August 2, 2025	
6	(United States) Dustin Pague	BKFC 86; Uncasville, Connecticut	January 17, 2026	
-	(England) Rico Franco def. Connor Tierney for interim title	BKFC 90; Birmingham, England	May 30, 2026	

=== Lightweight Championship ===
Weight limit: 155 lbs (70.3 kg)
The inaugural champion was determined by a 4-man tournament. This title was previously referred to as the BKFC Super Welterweight Championship before being renamed.

No.	Name	Event	Date	Defenses
1	(Peru) Luis Palomino def. Isaac Vallie-Flagg	BKFC 11; Oxford, Mississippi	July 24, 2020	1. def. Jim Alers at BKFC 14 on November 13, 2020; 2. def. Tyler Goodjohn at BKFC 18 on June 26, 2021; 3. def. Dat Nguyen at BKFC 22 on November 12, 2021; 4. def. Martin Brown at BKFC: KnuckleMania 2 on February 19, 2022; 5. def. Tom Shoaff at BKFC 34 on December 3, 2022; 6. def. James Lilley at BKFC 45 on June 23, 2023
In January 2024, Palomino stated the title was vacated because he felt he had no more to achieve in the division.
2	(Argentina) Franco Tenaglia def. Tony Soto	BKFC on DAZN; Marbella, Spain	October 12, 2024	
Tenaglia was stripped of the lightweight title in June 2025 after pulling out of his schedule title defense against Tony Soto.
-	(England) Ben Bonner def. Tony Soto for the interim title	BKFC 76; Fort Worth, Texas	June 21, 2025	
3	(England) Ben Bonner def. Austin Trout for the vacant title	BKFC Liberty Brawl; Philadelphia, Pennsylvania	July 3, 2026	

=== Featherweight Championship ===
Weight limit: 145 lbs (65.8 kg)

No.	Name	Event	Date	Defenses
1	(United States) Kai Stewart def. Louie Lopez	BKFC 44; Great Falls, Montana	June 9, 2023	1. def. Howard Davis at BKFC 56 on December 2, 2023; 2. def. Bryan Duran at BKFC 62 on June 21, 2024; 3. def. Jimmie Rivera at BKFC on DAZN 2 on November 9, 2024; 4. def. Tommy Strydom at BKFC 72 on April 5, 2025; 5. def. Nico Gaffie at BKFC 87 on March 20, 2026; 6. def. Harry Gigliotti at BKFC 92 on August 29, 2026

=== Bantamweight Championship ===
Weight limit: 135 lbs (61.2 kg)
The inaugural champion was determined by an 8-man tournament. This title was previously referred to as the BKFC Lightweight Championship before being renamed.

No.	Name	Event	Date	Defenses
1	(United States) Johnny Bedford def. Reggie Barnett Jr.	BKFC 6 Tampa, Florida	June 22, 2019	
2	(Vietnam) Dat Nguyen	BKFC KnuckleMania; Lakeland, Florida	February 5, 2021	
Nguyen was stripped of the title in June 2021 after he and the organization were not able to reach agreement on new contract.
3	(United States) Johnny Bedford (2) def. Reggie Barnett Jr.	BKFC 20; Biloxi, Mississippi	August 20, 2021	
—	(United States) Jarod Grant def. Anthony Retic for interim title	BKFC Fight Night 6 Salamanca, New York	March 12, 2022	
—	(United States) Reggie Barnett Jr. def. Jarod Grant for interim title	BKFC Fight Night 10; Tampa, Florida	July 23, 2022	1. def. Geane Herrera at BKFC 32 on November 5, 2022
Bedford retired from combat sports.
4	(United States) Reggie Barnett Jr. promoted to undisputed champion		January, 2023	1. def. Daniel Alvarez at BKFC 39 on March 24, 2023
5	(United States) Keith Richardson	BKFC 52; Columbia, South Carolina	October 20, 2023	
6	(Cuba) Alberto Blas	BKFC 62; Hollywood, Florida	June 21, 2024	1. def. Ryan Reber at BKFC 66 on September 13, 2024
Blas vacated the title in June 2025 due to a lack of competition
7	(United States) Justin Ibarrola def. Ryan Reber	BKFC 85; Hollywood, Florida	December 5, 2025	
Ibarrola vacated the title in March 2026 after signing with Misfits Boxing
8	(United States) Jamel Herring def. Michael Larrimore	BKFC 89; Thousand Palms, California	May 22, 2026	1. def. John Dodson at BKFC 95 on October 17, 2026

=== Flyweight Championship ===
Weight limit: 125 lbs (57.2 kg)

No.	Name	Event	Date	Defenses
1	(United States) John Dodson def. JR Ridge	BKFC 48; Albuquerque, New Mexico	August 11, 2023	1. drew with Dagoberto Aguero at BKFC 59 on March 29, 2024
-	(United States) Andrew Strode def. Guillermo Perez for the interim title	BKFC 78; Hollywood, Florida	July 12, 2025	
On October 16, 2026, BKFC CEO David Feldman announced the discontinuation of the flyweight division, citing a lack of quality competition at 125 pounds.

=== King of Streets Championship ===
No.	Name	Event	Date	Defenses
1	(Peru) Luis Palomino def. Howard Davis	BKFC 70; Hollywood, Florida	March 27, 2025	

== Women's championship history ==
=== Women's Featherweight Championship ===
Weight limit: 145 lbs (65.8 kg)

No.	Name	Event	Date	Defenses
1	(United States) Jessica Borga def. Hannah Rankin	BKFC 72: Day 2 Dubai, United Arab Emirates	April 5, 2025	

=== Women's Flyweight Championship ===
Weight limit: 125 lbs (56.7 kg)

No.	Name	Event	Date	Defenses
1	(United States) Christine Ferea def. Britain Hart	BKFC KnuckleMania 2 Hollywood, Florida	February 19, 2022	1. def. Taylor Starling at BKFC 28 on August 27, 2022; 2. def. Bec Rawlings at BKFC 41 on April 29, 2023; 3. def. Bec Rawlings at BKFC 56 on December 2, 2023; 4. def. Jade Masson-Wong at BKFC 65 on September 6, 2024; 5. def. Christine Vicens at BKFC on DAZN 3 on December 21, 2024

=== Women's Strawweight Championship ===
Weight limit: 115 lbs (52.2 kg)

No.	Name	Event	Date	Defenses
1	(United States) Britain Hart def. Charisa Sigala	BKFC 29; Great Falls, Montana	September 10, 2022	1. def. Jenny Clausius at BKFC 39 on March 24, 2023; 2. def. Melanie Shah at BKFC 51 on September 29, 2023; 3. def. Taylor Starling at BKFC 63 on August 3, 2024; 4. def. Tai Emery at BKFC 71 on April 4, 2025; 5. def. Sarah Shell at BKFC Liberty Brawl on July 3, 2026

== Symbolic titles ==
=== King of Violence Title ===
No.	Name	Event	Date	Division	Reign	Defenses
1	(United States) Mike Perry def. Eddie Alvarez	BKFC 56; Salt Lake City, UT, US	Dec 3, 2023	Middleweight	1079 days (incumbent)	1. def. Jeremy Stephens at BKFC 82 on Oct 4, 2025

=== Queen of Violence Title ===
No.	Name	Event	Date	Division	Reign	Defenses
1	(United States) Christine Ferea def. Jessica Borga	BKFC 82; Newark, NJ, US	Oct 4, 2025	Women's Bantamweight	408 days (incumbent)	1. def. Sofia Landi at BKFC 92 on Aug 29, 2026

== Tournament winners ==
Weight Class	Champion	Runner-up	Event	Date	Tournament Bracket
Heavyweight Championship Tournament	(United States) Arnold Adams	(United States) Sam Shewmaker	BKFC 3: The Takeover	October 20, 2018	Heavyweight Tournament Bracket
Lightweight Championship Tournament	(United States) Johnny Bedford	(United States) Reggie Barnett Jr.	BKFC 6: Malignaggi vs. Lobov	June 22, 2019	Lightweight Tournament Bracket
Super Welterweight Championship Tournament	(Peru) Luis Palomino	(United States) Isaac Vallie-Flagg	BKFC 11: Palomino vs. Vallie-Flagg	July 24, 2020	Super Welterweight Tournament Bracket

== BKFC records ==
Oldest champion	(Belarus) Andrei Arlovski	47 years, 3 days
Youngest champion	(United States) Kai Stewart	22 years, 11 months
Longest championship reign	(Peru) Luis Palomino	1288 days
Shortest championship reign	(United States) Chase Sherman	98 days
Most title fight wins	(Peru) Luis Palomino	9
Most wins	(United States) Lorenzo Hunt	13
Most consecutive title defenses	(Peru) Luis Palomino (United States) Kai Stewart	6
Most consecutive wins	(Cuba) Leonardo Perdomo	12

== Death of Justin Thornton ==
The BKFC was involved in controversy after the death of boxer Justin Thornton on August 20, 2021, at BKFC 20. Justin Thornton died as a result of spinal injury suffered during his BKFC debut. Thornton had been on a five-fight losing streak ahead of the fight.

The matchmaking and regulations were criticized by UFC president Dana White, who said “...is anybody shocked? I mean, in bare-knuckle fighting? I’m not a big fan. ...We’ve been putting on fights for 25 years. I’ve done over 7,000 fights with no serious injuries in the UFC. That if they weren’t in the UFC, they probably would’ve fought and they probably would’ve died. So we shouldn’t even be talked about in the same sentence as bare-knuckle boxing."

== See also ==
- List of boxing organisations
- BYB Extreme Fighting Series
