= 2021 in Bare Knuckle Fighting Championship =

Information
- First date: February 5, 2021
- Last date: December 18, 2021

Events
- Total events: 13

Fights
- Total fights: 141
- Title fights: 9

Chronology
2020 in Bare Knuckle Fighting Championship	2021 in Bare Knuckle Fighting Championship	2022 in Bare Knuckle Fighting Championship

The year 2021 was the fourth year in the history of the Bare Knuckle Fighting Championship, a bare-knuckle fighting promotion based in Philadelphia. The year consisted of 13 events, including an inaugural Fight Night event alongside nine title fights. The promotion also saw the inception of the new Cruiserweight division and its inaugural title fight at BKFC 18.

== Background ==
2021 season is expected to start with Bare Knuckle Fighting Championship: KnuckleMania. BKFC is available on PPV all over the world and on FITE TV.

== BKFC 2021 Awards ==
The following fighters won the BKFC year-end awards for 2022

- BKFC Fighter of the Year 2022: Luis Palomino
- BKFC Female Fighter of the Year 2022: Britain Hart
- BKFC Fight of the Year 2022: Taylor Starling vs. Charisa Sigala (BKFC: KnuckleMania)
- BKFC Knockout of the Year 2022: Joe Riggs over Melvin Guillard (BKFC FN: Montana)

== List of events ==
#	Event	Date	Venue	Location
1	BKFC Knucklemania	February 5, 2021	RP Funding Center	(United States) Lakeland, Florida, USA
2	BKFC: Bare Knuckle Kingdom	March 6, 2021	The Sea Galleri	Phuket, Thailand
3	BKFC 16: Garcia vs. Elmore	March 19, 2021	Biloxi Civic Center	(United States) Biloxi, Mississippi, USA
4	BKFC 17: Tate vs. Burns	April 30, 2021	Boutwell Memorial Auditorium	(United States) Birmingham, Alabama, USA
5	BKFC 18: Beltran vs. Shewmaker	June 26, 2021	Seminole Hard Rock Hotel & Casino	(United States) Hollywood, Florida, USA
6	BKFC 19: VanZant vs. Ostovich	July 23, 2021	Florida State Fairgrounds	(United States) Tampa Bay, Florida, USA
7	BKFC 20: Bedford vs. Barnett	August 20, 2021	Mississippi Coast Coliseum	(United States) Biloxi, Mississippi, USA
8	BKFC 21: Cochrane vs. Burns	September 10, 2021	Ralston Arena	(United States) Omaha, Nebraska, USA
9	BKFC Fight Night Montana: Riggs vs. Guillard	October 9, 2021	First Interstate Arena	(United States) Billings, Montana, USA
10	BKFC Fight Night Wichita: Rickels vs. Lane	October 23, 2021	Hartman Arena	(United States) Park City, Kansas, USA
11	BKFC Fight Night New York: Beltran vs. Adams	November 6, 2021	Seneca Allegany Resort & Casino Event Center	(United States) Salamanca, New York, USA
12	BKFC 22 Miami: Lombard vs. Hunt	November 12, 2021	James L. Knight Center	(United States) Miami, Florida, USA
13	BKFC Fight Night Tampa: Brown vs. Taylor	December 9, 2021	Seminole Hard Rock Hotel and Casino Tampa	(United States) Tampa, Florida, USA
14	BKFC Thailand 1: The Game Changer	December 18, 2021	Royal Cliff Hotels Group	Pattaya, Thailand

== BKFC KnuckleMania ==
BKFC KnuckleMania
- Promotion: Bare Knuckle Fighting Championship
- Date: February 5, 2021
- Venue: RP Funding Center
- City: (United States) Lakeland, Florida, USA

BKFC KnuckleMania was a bare-knuckle fighting event held by Bare Knuckle Fighting Championship on February 5, 2021, in Miami, USA.

=== Background ===
Former UFC star Paige VanZant made her bare-knuckle fighting debut in the main event.

Chris Leben made his combat sports retirement appearance against Quentin Henry.

Uly Diaz was initially scheduled to compete on the card, but was eventually removed from the card due to an unknown reason.

Bonus awards

The following fighters were awarded bonuses:

- Fight of the Night: Taylor Starling vs. Charisa Sigala

=== Results ===
BKFC KnuckleMania
Weight Class				Method	Round	Time	Notes
Women's Featherweight 57 kg	(United States) Britain Hart	def.	(United States) Paige VanZant	Decision (unanimous)	5	2:00	49-46, 49-46, 49-46
Lightweight 61.5 kg	(United States) Dat Nguyen	def.	(United States) Johnny Bedford (c)	Decision (unanimous)	5	2:00	For the BKFC Bantamweight Championship and Police Gazette World Lightweight Championship. 48-47, 48-47, 49-46.
Heavyweight 120 kg	(United States) Chris Leben	def.	(United States) Quentin Henry	TKO (punches)	1	1:07	
Lightweight 62.5 kg	(United States) Martin Brown	def.	(United States) Zach Zane	KO (punch)	2	1.28	
Light Heavyweight 84 kg	(United States) Lorenzo Hunt	def.	(United States) Rob Morrow	KO (punch)	4	2:00	
Featherweight 57 kg	(United States) John Chalbeck	def.	(United States) Greg Bono	KO (punch)	3	0:28	
Light Heavyweight 84 kg	(Israel) Haim Gozali	def.	(United States) John McAllister	TKO (punch)	2	1:08	
Heavyweight 120 kg	(United States) Dillon Cleckler	def.	(United States) Chris Jensen	TKO (punch)	1	0:34	
Women's Featherweight 57 kg	(United States) Taylor Starling	def.	(United States) Charisa Sigala	Decision (unanimous)	5	2:00	50-43, 50-43, 49-44
Preliminary Card
Lightweight 61.5 kg	(United States) Travis Thompson	def.	(United States) Dave Morgan	TKO (retirement)	2	0:22	
Lightweight 61.5 kg	(United States) Jarod Grant	def.	(United States) Brandon Lambert	KO (punch)	3	1:11	

== BKFC: Bare Knuckle Kingdom ==
BKFC: Bare Knuckle Kingdom
- Promotion: Bare Knuckle Fighting Championship & Full Metal Dojo
- Date: March 6, 2021
- Venue: The Sea Galleri
- City: Phuket, Thailand

BKFC: Bare Knuckle Kingdom is a bare-knuckle fighting event by Bare Knuckle Fighting Championship in partnership with Full Metal Dojo held on March 6, 2021, in Thailand.

=== Background ===
In the main event, Steve Banks faced Nikolay Gussev and in the co-main event and Tee Jay Chang faced Fabiano Hawthorne.

=== Results ===
BKFC: Bare Knuckle Kingdom
Weight Class				Method	Round	Time	Notes
Heavyweight 120 kg	(United States) Steve Banks	def.	(Kazakhstan) Nikolay Gussev	TKO (doctor stoppage)	1	2:00	
Welterweight 76 kg	(Brazil) Fabiano Hawthorne	def.	(England) Tee Jay Chang	TKO (retirement)	4	2:00	
W.Strawweight 54 kg	(France) Souris Manfredi	def.	(Thailand) Kesorn Saenlakhon	KO (punch)	1		
Middleweight 80 kg	(Canada) Jonny Tello	def.	(Brazil) Jean Carlos Pereira	KO (punch)	2		
Lightweight 68 kg	(Russia) Vlad Vokhmintsev	def.	(Thailand) Naeem Binhar	TKO	4		
Bantamweight 62.5 kg	(Thailand) Kajonpong Suwantee	def.	(Philippines) Rockie Bactol	KO (punch)	2	0:37	
W.Flyweight 54 kg	(Thailand) Po Denman	def.	(Thailand) Ketmanee Chasing	KO (punch)	3	1:57	
Middleweight 77 kg	(Brazil) Gilberto Patrocinio	def.	(New Zealand) Daniel Kerr	TKO (doctor stoppage)	3	2:00	
Featherweight 65 kg	(Thailand) Tetee Denman	def.	(Turkey) Omer Semet	KO (punch)	1	0:42	
Welterweight 74 kg	(Germany) Kristof Kirsch	def.	(Thailand) Sriracha Siriphana	KO	2	1:08	
Flyweight 57 kg	(Mongolia) Mega Borkhuu	def.	(Thailand) Fanta Fairtex	TKO (doctor stoppage)	3	2:00	

== BKFC 16: Garcia vs. Elmore ==
BKFC 16: Garcia vs. Elmore
- Promotion: Bare Knuckle Fighting Championship
- Date: March 19, 2021
- Venue: Biloxi Civic Center
- City: (United States) Biloxi, Mississippi, USA

BKFC 16: Garcia vs. Elmore was a bare-knuckle fighting event held by Bare Knuckle Fighting Championship on March 19, 2021, in Biloxi, Mississippi, USA.

=== Background ===
The event was headlined by Leonard Garcia and Joe Elmore in a lightweight bout.

Former WBO Junior Welterweight World Champion DeMarcus Corley made his bare-knuckle boxing debut at this event against Reggie Barnett Jr.

Bonus awards

The following fighters were awarded bonuses:

- Fight of the Night: David Diaz vs. Spencer Ruggeri
- Knockout of the Night: Arnold Adams

=== Results ===
BKFC 16: Garcia vs. Elmore
Weight Class				Method	Round	Time	Notes
Super Welterweight 70 kg	(United States) Leonard Garcia	def.	(United States) Joe Elmore	Decision (unanimous)	5	2:00	50-45, 50-45, 49-46
Lightweight 62.5 kg	(United States) Reggie Barnett Jr.	def.	(United States) DeMarcus Corley	TKO (retirement)	4	2:00	
Heavyweight 120 kg	(United States) Arnold Adams	def.	(United States) Bobo O'Bannon	TKO (punches)	1	1:58	
Middleweight 75 kg	(United States) Kaleb Harris	def.	(United States) Noah Cutter	TKO (doctor stoppage)	1	2:00	
Light Heavyweight 84 kg	(United States) Scott O'Shaughnessy	def.	(United States) Melvin Guillard	TKO (punches)	1	0:46	
Heavyweight 120 kg	(United States) Jason Fish	def.	(United States) Adrian Miles	TKO (punches)	3	1:20	
Lightweight 62.5 kg	(United States) David Diaz	def.	(United States) Spencer Ruggeri	Decision (majority)	5	2:00	47-47, 48-45, 48-45
Middleweight 75 kg	(United States) Elvin Brito	def.	(United States) Brad Kelly	Decision (unanimous)	5	2:00	48-47, 50-45, 49-47
Middleweight 75 kg	(United States) Zion Tomlinson	def.	(United States) Tyler Hill	TKO (punches)	1	1:40	
Light Heavyweight 84 kg	(United States) Ryan Jones	def.	(United States) Eric Thompson	TKO (injury)	2	2:00	

== BKFC 17: Tate vs. Burns ==
BKFC 17: Tate vs. Burns
- Promotion: Bare Knuckle Fighting Championship
- Date: April 30, 2021
- Venue: Boutwell Memorial Auditorium
- City: Birmingham, Alabama, United States

BKFC 17: Tate vs. Burns was a bare-knuckle fighting event by Bare Knuckle Fighting Championship held on April 30, 2021, at the Boutwell Memorial Auditorium in Birmingham, Alabama.

Bonus awards

The following fighters were awarded bonuses:

- Fight of the Night: Bobo O'Bannon vs. Zach Calmus
- Knockout of the Night: Ronnie Rogers

=== Results ===
BKFC 17: Tate vs. Burns
Weight Class				Method	Round	Time	Notes
Heavyweight 120 kg	(United States) Frank Tate	def.	(United States) Josh Burns	TKO (corner stoppage)	3	1:02	BKFC Heavyweight Championship title eliminator.
Catchweight 82.5 kg	(United States) Mike Richman	def.	(United States) Marcel Stamps	TKO (shoulder injury)	1	1:11	
Catchweight 88.5 kg	(United States) Lorenzo Hunt	def.	(United States) Josh Dyer	TKO (referee stoppage)	5	0:52	
Super Welterweight 70 kg	(United States) Ronnie Rogers	def.	(United States) Dimitri Angelini	TKO (punch)	1	1:37	
Heavyweight 120 kg	(United States) Bobo O'Bannon	def.	(United States) Zach Calmus	TKO (doctor stoppage)	2	2:00	
Cruiserweight 93 kg	(Pakistan) Ezatullah Kakar	def.	(United States) Chris Sarro	KO (punch)	1	0:46	
Light Heavyweight 84 kg	(United States) Robert Washington	def.	(United States) Ryan Jones	TKO (doctor stoppage)	2	0:52	
Super Welterweight 70 kg	(United States) Tom Shoaff	def.	(United States) Nathan Mitchell	TKO (punches)	1	1:38	
Preliminary Card
Welterweight 66 kg	(United States) Rusty Crowder	def.	(United States) Daniel Gary	KO (punches)	1	1:00	
Lightweight 61 kg	(United States) Anthony Retic	def.	(United States) Raymond Locker	KO (punches)	1	0:38	

== BKFC 18: Beltran vs. Shewmaker ==
BKFC 18: Beltran vs. Shewmaker
- Promotion: Bare Knuckle Fighting Championship
- Date: June 26, 2021
- Venue: Seminole Hard Rock Hotel & Casino
- City: Miami, Florida, United States

BKFC 18: Beltran vs. Shewmaker was a bare-knuckle fighting event by Bare Knuckle Fighting Championship held on June 26, 2021, in Miami, Florida.

=== Results ===
BKFC 18: Beltran vs. Shewmaker
Weight Class				Method	Round	Time	Notes
Heavyweight 120 kg	(United States) Joey Beltran (c)	def.	(United States) Sam Shewmaker	Decision (unanimous)	5	2:00	For the BKFC Heavyweight Championship. 49-46, 49-46, 48-47.
Cruiserweight 92 kg	(Cuba) Héctor Lombard	def.	(United States) Joe Riggs	TKO (doctor stoppage)	4	1:07	For the BKFC Cruiserweight Championship.
Middleweight 79 kg	(Brazil) Thiago Alves	def.	(Cuba) Ulysses Diaz	TKO (doctor stoppage)	3	2:00	For the BKFC Middleweight Championship.
Lightweight 70 kg	(Peru) Luis Palomino (c)	def.	(England) Tyler Goodjohn	Decision (unanimous)	5	2:00	For the BKFC Lightweight Championship. 50-45, 50-45, 50-45.
Women's Featherweight 57 kg	(United States) Pearl Gonzalez	def.	(United States) Charisa Sigala	Decision (unanimous)	5	2:00	50-45, 50-45, 50-45
Welterweight 77 kg	(United States) Julian Lane	def.	(United States) Jake Bostwick	Decision (unanimous)	5	2:00	50-44, 50-43, 48-45
Featherweight 57 kg	(United States) Jarod Grant	def.	(United States) Travis Thompson	TKO (doctor stoppage)	4	0:35	
Lightweight 70 kg	(United States) Eddie Hoch	def.	(Canada) Bruce Lutchmedial	Decision (unanimous)	5	2:00	48-47, 48-47, 49-46
Heavyweight 120 kg	(United States) Steve Hérélius	def.	(United States) Juan Torres	Decision (split)	5	2:00	48-47, 47-48, 49-46
Middleweight 82.5 kg	(Italy) Francesco Ricchi	def.	(United States) Brian Maxwell	TKO (punches)	2	1:25	
Preliminary Card
Lightweight 70 kg	(United States) Montaser Aboughaly	def.	(United States) Luke Parson	KO (punches)	1	0:34	
Catchweight 72 kg	(United States) Josh Alvarez	def.	(United States) Paul Teague	KO (punches)	1	0:17	
Welterweight 75 kg	(Cuba) Yosdenis Cedeno	def.	(United States) Alan Arzeno	Decision (split)	5	2:00	46-49, 49-46, 49-46
Light Heavyweight 85 kg	(United States) Eduardo Concepcion	def.	(United States) Gabe Brown	KO (punch)	1	0:05	

== BKFC 19: VanZant vs. Ostovich ==
BKFC 19: VanZant vs. Ostovich
- Promotion: Bare Knuckle Fighting Championship
- Date: July 23, 2021
- Venue: Florida State Fairgrounds
- City: (United States) Tampa Bay, Florida USA

BKFC 19: VanZant vs. Ostovich was a bare-knuckle fighting event by Bare Knuckle Fighting Championship held on July 23, 2021, at the Florida State Fairgrounds Tampa Bay, Florida USA.

=== Background ===
The event was headlined by a bare-knuckle boxing rematch Paige VanZant and Rachael Ostovich, who previously fought in mixed martial arts at UFC Fight Night: Cejudo vs. Dillashaw on January 19, 2019.

Also announced for the card, Britain Hart faced Jenny Savage.

Also featured on the card were three "Platform Showdown Fights", amateur bouts between internet celebrities. Rapper Blueface fought TikTok star Kane Trujillo; YouTuber and Musical artist Nick Ireland faced TikToker DK Money; and TikToker Evil Hero met fellow TikToker Dakota Olave.

Bonus awards

The following fighters were awarded bonuses:

- Fight of the Night: Paige VanZant vs. Rachael Ostovich
- Knockout of the Night: Jared Warren

=== Results ===
BKFC 19: VanZant vs. Ostovich
Weight Class				Method	Round	Time	Notes
Women's Flyweight 57 kg	(United States) Rachael Ostovich	def.	(United States) Paige VanZant	Decision (unanimous)	5	2:00	48-47, 48-47, 49-46
Heavyweight 120 kg	(United States) Arnold Adams	def.	(England) Michael Terrill	KO (punch)	3	0:38	
Women's Flyweight 57 kg	(United States) Britain Hart	def.	(United States) Jenny Savage	TKO (referee stoppage)	3	1:55	
Women's Flyweight 57 kg	(United States) Taylor Starling	def.	(United States) Cassie Robb	TKO (referee stoppage)	1	0:28	
Flyweight 57 kg	(United States) Geane Herrera	def.	(Puerto Rico) Abdiel Velazquez	TKO (punches)	2	0:14	
Lightweight 70 kg	(United States) Blueface	def.	(United States) Kane Trujillo	Decision (unanimous)	3	2:00	Platform Showdown Fight (Gloved)
Catchweight 86.2 kg	(United States) Nick Ireland	def.	(United States) DK Money	Decision (majority)	3	2:00	Platform Showdown Fight (Gloved)
Catchweight 63.5 kg	(United States) Evil Hero	def.	(United States) Dakota Olave	Decision (unanimous)	3	2:00	Platform Showdown Fight (Gloved)
Light Heavyweight 84 kg	(United States) Terry Janoski	def.	(United States) Richard Carsten	TKO (punch)	1	1:55	
Welterweight 75 kg	(United States) Antonio Soto	def.	(United States) Josh Sikes	Decision (unanimous)	5	2:00	50-45, 49-46, 48-47
Light Heavyweight 84 kg	(United States) Jared Warren	def.	(United States) Zion Tomlinson	KO (punch)	1	1:14	
Preliminary Card
Light Heavyweight 84 kg	(United States) Jay Jackson	def.	(United States) Damon Bell	KO (punch)	3	1:58	
Heavyweight 120 kg	(United States) Christopher Jensen	def.	(United States) Kyle McElroy	TKO (punches)	1	1:17	
Welterweight 75 kg	(United States) Jordan Nash	def.	(United States) Branden Allen	Decision (unanimous)	5	2:00	48-47, 48-47, 48-47

== BKFC 20: Bedford vs. Barnett ==
BKFC 20: Bedford vs. Barnett
- Promotion: Bare Knuckle Fighting Championship
- Date: August 20, 2021
- Venue: Mississippi Coast Coliseum
- City: (United States) Biloxi, Mississippi

BKFC 20: Bedford vs. Barnett was a bare-knuckle fighting event by Bare Knuckle Fighting Championship held on August 20, 2021.

=== Background ===
The event was headlined by a title rematch for the vacant BKFC Bantamweight Championship between Johnny Bedford and Reggie Barnett. The two previously fought for the title at BKFC 6 on June 22, 2019, where Bedford won by unanimous decision.

Former UFC fighter Alan Belcher made his bare-knuckle debut against Tony Lopez.

=== Results ===
BKFC 20: Bedford vs. Barnett
Weight Class				Method	Round	Time	Notes
Bantamweight 61 kg	(United States) Johnny Bedford	def.	(United States) Reggie Barnett Jr.	Decision (unanimous)	5	2:00	For the vacant BKFC Bantamweight Championship. 48-46, 50-44, 49-46.
Heavyweight 120 kg	(United States) Alan Belcher	def.	(United States) Tony Lopez	Decision (unanimous)	5	2:00	49-46, 48-47, 50-45
Cruiserweight 93 kg	(United States) Quentin Henry	def.	(United States) Jason Fish	KO	2	0:36	
Heavyweight 120 kg	(United States) Dillon Cleckler	def.	(United States) Justin Thornton	KO	1	0:19	Thornton died from complications of this knockout.
Heavyweight 120 kg	(United States) Bobo O'Bannon	def.	(United States) Lewis Rumsey	TKO	4	0:33	
Light Heavyweight 84 kg	(United States) Harris Stephenson	def.	(United States) Melvin Guillard	DQ	2	0:15	
Welterweight 75 kg	(Puerto Rico) Elvin Brito	def.	(Mexico) Julio Garcia	Decision (majority)	5	2:00	48-48, 48-47, 48-47
Welterweight 75 kg	(United States) Kaleb Harris	def.	(United States) Derrick Findley	Decision (unanimous)	5	2:00	50-45, 50-45, 50-46
Light Heavyweight 84 kg	(United States) Scott O'Shaughnessy	def.	(United States) David Simpson	Decision (unanimous)	5	2:00	48-44, 48-44, 49-45
Lightweight 70 kg	(United States) Adam Pellarano	def.	(United States) John Chalbeck	Decision (split)	5	2:00	47-48, 48-47, 49-46
Light Heavyweight 84 kg	(United States) Ryan Jones	def.	(United States) Kaine Tomlinson Sr.	KO	1	1:49	
Lightweight 70 kg	(United States) Bobby Taylor	def.	(United States) Ronnie Rogers	KO	1	1:51	

== BKFC 21: Cochrane vs. Burns ==
BKFC 21: Cochrane vs. Burns
- Promotion: Bare Knuckle Fighting Championship
- Date: September 10, 2021
- Venue: Ralston Arena
- City: (United States) Omaha, Nebraska

BKFC 21: Cochrane vs. Burns was a bare-knuckle fighting event by Bare Knuckle Fighting Championship held on September 10, 2021.

=== Background ===
The event was headlined by a bout between Dakota Cochrane and Mike Richman.

The event also featured the BKFC debut of former UFC fighter Houston Alexander.

=== Results ===
BKFC 21: Cochrane vs. Burns
Weight Class				Method	Round	Time	Notes
Light Heavyweight 84 kg	(United States) Mike Richman	def.	(United States) Dakota Cochrane	KO (punch)	2	0:37	
Heavyweight 120 kg	(United States) Josh Burns	def.	(United States) Sam Shewmaker	KO (punch)	1	0:19	
Heavyweight 120 kg	(United States) Houston Alexander	def.	(United States) Wes Combs	KO (punch)	1	0:34	
Lightweight 70 kg	(United States) Ryan Roberts	def.	(United States) Jorge Gonzalez	KO (punch)	2	0:29	
Welterweight 75 kg	(United States) Jason High	def.	(United States) Rocky Long	TKO (punches)	1	1:59	
Welterweight 75 kg	(United States) Sean Wilson	def.	(United States) Will Shutt	TKO (punches)	1	1:21	
Lightweight 70 kg	(United States) Cody Land	def.	(United States) TJ Benson	KO (body shot)	2	1:29	
Lightweight 72.5 kg	(United States) JC DeLeon	def.	(United States) Keilen Fantroy	TKO (punches)	2	1:36	
Preliminary Card
Cruiserweight 93 kg	(United States) Erick Murray	def.	(United States) Roberto Guzman	TKO (punch)	2	1:52	
Welterweight 75 kg	(United States) Carlos Trinidad	def.	(United States) Noah Cutter	KO (punch)	1	0:38	
Light Heavyweight 84 kg	(United States) Jeff Souder	def.	(United States) Adam Valcourt	KO (punch)	2	0:49	

== BKFC Fight Night Montana: Riggs vs. Guillard ==
BKFC Fight Night Montana: Riggs vs. Guillard
- Promotion: Bare Knuckle Fighting Championship
- Date: October 9, 2021
- Venue: First Interstate Arena
- City: (United States) Billings, Montana

BKFC Fight Night Montana: Riggs vs. Guillard (also known as BKFC Fight Night 1) was a bare-knuckle fighting event held by Bare Knuckle Fighting Championship held on October 9, 2021.

=== Background ===
The event was the inaugural event in the BKFC Fight Night series. It was headlined by a bout between former UFC fighters Melvin Guillard and Joe Riggs.

Bonus awards

The following fighters were awarded bonuses:

- Fight of the Night: Tom Shoaff vs. Josh Wright
- Knockout of the Night: Lloyd Mix

=== Results ===
BKFC Fight Night Montana: Riggs vs. Guillard
Weight Class				Method	Round	Time	Notes
Light Heavyweight 84 kg	(United States) Joe Riggs	def.	(United States) Melvin Guillard	KO (punch)	1	0:59	
Women's Flyweight 57 kg	(United States) Christine Ferea	def.	(Colombia) Calista Silgado	KO (punches)	3	1:34	
Middleweight 79 kg	(United States) Lloyd Mix	def.	(United States) Brett Fields	KO (punch)	1	0:14	
Heavyweight 120 kg	(United States) Leo Bercier	def.	(United States) Luis Villasenor	KO (punches)	2	1:26	
Lightweight 70 kg	(United States) Tom Shoaff	def.	(United States) Josh Wright	TKO (punches)	2	1:25	
Heavyweight 120 kg	(United States) Bryant Acheson	def.	(United States) Josh Watson	KO (punch)	1	0:30	
Women's Flyweight 57 kg	(United States) Jade Masson-Wong	def.	(United States) Crystal Pittman	TKO (doctor's stoppage)	3	0:21	
Preliminary Card
Middleweight 79 kg	(United States) Dallas Davison	def.	(United States) JorDan Christensen	TKO (doctor's stoppage)	2	2:00	
Light Heavyweight 84 kg	(United States) Sawyer Depee	def.	(United States) James Dennis	TKO (punches)	1	1:01	
Featherweight 57 kg	(United States) Kai Stewart	def.	(United States) Darrick Gates	TKO (punches)	1	1:24	

== BKFC Fight Night Wichita: Rickels vs. Lane ==
BKFC Fight Night Wichita: Rickels vs. Lane
- Promotion: Bare Knuckle Fighting Championship
- Date: October 23, 2021
- Venue: Hartman Arena
- City: (United States) Wichita, Kansas

BKFC Fight Night Wichita: Rickels vs. Lane (also known as BKFC Fight Night 2) was a bare-knuckle fighting event held by Bare Knuckle Fighting Championship on October 23, 2021.

=== Results ===
BKFC Fight Night Wichita: Rickels vs. Lane
Weight Class				Method	Round	Time	Notes
Middleweight 80 kg	(United States) David Rickels	def.	(United States) Julian Lane	Decision (unanimous)	5	2:00	50-45, 49-46, 49-46
Light Heavyweight 84 kg	(United States) Isaac Doolittle	def.	(United States) Jay Jackson	Decision (majority)	5	2:00	47-47, 48-46, 48-46
Bantamweight 61 kg	(United States) Marciano Hernandez	def.	(United States) Andy Locker	KO (punch)	1	1:46	
Middleweight 80 kg	(United States) Jake Lindsey	def.	(United States) Eric Thompson	TKO (referee stoppage)	3	1:00	
W.Flyweight 57 kg	(United States) Charisa Sigala	def.	(United States) Jessica Link	Decision (split)	5	2:00	47-48, 48-47, 48-47
Featherweight 66 kg	(United States) Chevy Bridges	def.	(United States) LJ Hermreck	KO (punch)	1	1:23	
Bantamweight 61 kg	(United States) Mark Irwin	def.	(United States) Drake Heitfield	KO (punch)	2	1:30	
Flyweight 57 kg	(United States) Chancey Wilson	def.	(United States) Joshua Richey	Decision (unanimous)	5	2:00	50-44, 50-44, 48-46
Preliminary Card
Featherweight 66 kg	(United States) Shawn Moffett	def.	(United States) Nick Villar	KO (punches)	1	0:58	
Lightweight 70 kg	(United States) Johnny Pantoja	def.	(United States) Luke Parsons	KO (punches)	2	0:24	

== BKFC Fight Night New York: Beltran vs. Adams ==
BKFC Fight Night New York: Beltran vs. Adams
- Promotion: Bare Knuckle Fighting Championship
- Date: November 6, 2021
- Venue: Seneca Allegany Resort & Casino Event Center
- City: (United States) Salamanca, New York

BKFC Fight Night New York: Beltran vs. Adams (also known as BKFC Fight Night 3) was a bare-knuckle fighting event held by Bare Knuckle Fighting Championship held on November 6, 2021.

=== Background ===
The event was headlined by a rematch between Joey Beltran and Arnold Adams for the BKFC Heavyweight Championship. The pair originally fought in 2018 at BKFC 2: A New Era, with Adams winning via TKO in the fourth round.

Bonus awards

The following fighters were awarded bonuses:

- Fight of the Night: Arnold Adams vs. Joey Beltran
- Knockout of the Night: Matt Phillips

=== Results ===
BKFC Fight Night New York: Beltran vs. Adams
Weight Class				Method	Round	Time	Notes
Heavyweight 120 kg	(United States) Arnold Adams	def.	(United States) Joey Beltran (c)	Decision (unanimous)	5	5:00	For the BKFC Heavyweight Championship. 49-46, 48-47, 49-46.
Welterweight 75 kg	(United States) Jake Young	def.	(United States) Dustin Pague	DQ (illegal ground strikes)	1	0:57	
Bantamweight 61 kg	(United States) Travis Thompson	def.	(United States) Jack Grady	TKO (punches)	3	1:18	
Welterweight 75 kg	(United States) Matt Phillips	def.	(United States) Derek Greene	KO (punch)	1	0:35	
Featherweight 66 kg	(United States) Louie Lopez	def.	(United States) Gabe Sacchetti	TKO (punches)	1	1:38	
Bantamweight 61 kg	(United States) Devin Gibson	def.	(Canada) Ray Lopez	Decision (unanimous)	5	2:00	50-45, 50-45, 50-45
Preliminary Card
Heavyweight 120 kg	(United States) Art Parker	def.	(United States) Lewis Rumsey	TKO (cut)	2	0:41	
Middleweight 80 kg	(United States) Christian Torres	def.	(United States) Art Driscoll	TKO (punches)	2	0:16	

== BKFC 22 Miami: Lombard vs. Hunt ==
BKFC 22 Miami: Lombard vs. Hunt
- Promotion: Bare Knuckle Fighting Championship
- Date: November 12, 2021
- Venue: James L. Knight Center
- City: (United States) Miami, Florida

BKFC 22 Miami: Lombard vs. Hunt was a bare-knuckle fighting event held by Bare Knuckle Fighting Championship on November 12, 2021.

=== Background ===
The event was headlined by a title match between the BKFC Cruiserweight Champion Hector Lombard and Lorenzo Hunt for the inaugural BKFC Light Heavyweight Championship.

The co-main event saw Luis Palomino defending the BKFC Lightweight Championship against former BKFC Bantamweight Champion Dat Nguyen.

Bonus awards

The following fighters were awarded bonuses:

- Fights of the Night: Luis Palomino vs. Dat Nguyen and Britain Hart vs. Pearl Gongalez

=== Results ===
BKFC 22 Miami: Lombard vs. Hunt
Weight Class				Method	Round	Time	Notes
Light Heavyweight 84 kg	(United States) Lorenzo Hunt	def.	(Cuba) Hector Lombard	Decision (unanimous)	5	2:00	For the vacant BKFC Light Heavyweight Championship. 48-47, 48-47, 49-46.
Lightweight 70 kg	(Peru) Luis Palomino (c)	def.	(Vietnam) Dat Nguyen	Decision (unanimous)	5	2:00	For the BKFC Lightweight Championship. 49-46, 48-47, 50-45.
W.Flyweight 57 kg	(United States) Britain Hart	def.	(United States) Pearl Gonzalez	Decision (unanimous)	5	2:00	48-47, 48-47, 49-46
Heavyweight 120 kg	(United States) Gustavo Trujillo	def.	(United States) Mike Kyle	KO (punches)	1	0:34	
Featherweight 66 kg	(United States) Marcus Brimage	-	(United States) Will Shutt	Draw (split)	5	2:00	49-45, 48-46, 47-47
Featherweight 66 kg	(United States) Howard Davis	def.	(United States) Rusty Crowder	Decision (unanimous)	5	2:00	50-45, 50-45, 49-46
Lightweight 70 kg	(United States) Arthur Walcott-Ceesay	def.	(United States) Joshuah Alvarez	Decision (unanimous)	5	2:00	48-45, 48-45, 50-44
Featherweight 66 kg	(United States) Montaser Aboughaly	def.	(United States) Jonathan Noah	KO (punches)	2	0:46	
Preliminary Card
Catchweight 81.5 kg	(United States) James Rodriguez	def.	(United States) Brian Maxwell	TKO (punches)	1	1:18	
Lightweight 70 kg	(United States) Peter Peraza	def.	(United States) Manuel Moreira	Decision (unanimous)	5	2:00	48-45, 48-45, 49-45
Catchweight 59 kg	(United States) Tyler Randall	def.	(United States) Darwin Bonilla	Decision (unanimous)	5	2:00	48-45, 48-45, 48-45

== BKFC Fight Night Tampa: Brown vs. Taylor ==
BKFC Fight Night Tampa: Brown vs. Taylor
- Promotion: Bare Knuckle Fighting Championship
- Date: December 9, 2021
- Venue: Seminole Hard Rock Hotel and Casino Tampa
- City: (United States) Tampa, Florida

BKFC Fight Night Tampa: Brown vs. Taylor (also known as BKFC Fight Night 4) was a bare-knuckle fighting event by Bare Knuckle Fighting Championship held on December 9, 2021.

=== Background ===
The event was headlined by a Lightweight Title Eliminator bout between Martin Brown and Bobby Taylor.

Bonus awards

The following fighters were awarded bonuses:

- Fights of the Night: Noah Cutter vs. Jordan Nash and Rynell Riley vs. Trukon Carson

=== Results ===
BKFC Fight Night Tampa: Brown vs. Taylor
Weight Class				Method	Round	Time	Notes
Lightweight 70 kg	(United States) Martin Brown	def.	(United States) Bobby Taylor	Decision (unanimous)	5	2:00	49-43, 49-43, 49-43
W.Flyweight 57 kg	(United States) Taylor Starling	def.	(United States) Hannah Guy	Decision (unanimous)	5	2:00	50-45, 50-45, 50-45
Light Heavyweight 85 kg	(United States) David Mundell	def.	(Moldova) Stanislav Grosu	Decision (unanimous)	5	2:00	48-46, 48-46, 48-46
W.Strawweight 52 kg	(United States) Jenny Savage	def.	(United States) Delaney Bailey	Decision (split)	5	2:00	47-48, 48-47, 49-46
Welterweight 75 kg	(United States) Noah Cutter	def.	(United States) Jordan Nash	TKO (doctor stoppage)	5	0:46	
Lightweight 70 kg	(United States) Robbie Peralta	def.	(United States) Peter Petties	Decision (unanimous)	5	2:00	49-46, 49-46, 48-47
Bantamweight 61 kg	(United States) Joshua Ridge	def.	(United States) Jerald Gregori	KO (punches)	1	0:41	
Preliminary Card
Welterweight 75 kg	(United States) Rynell Riley	def.	(United States) Trukon Carson	TKO (doctor stoppage)	3	0:17	
Featherweight 66 kg	(United States) Stevo Morris	def.	(United States) Jorge Gonzalez Rolon	KO (punches)	2	1:43	
Welterweight 75 kg	(United States) Joshua Sikes	def.	(United States) Michael Stripling	Decision (unanimous)	5	2:00	48-47, 48-47, 49-46

== BKFC Thailand 1: The Game Changer ==
BKFC Thailand 1: The Game Changer
- Promotion: Bare Knuckle Fighting Championship
- Date: December 18, 2021
- Venue: Royal Cliff Hotels Group
- City: Pattaya, Thailand

BKFC Thailand 1: The Game Changer was a bare-knuckle fighting event by Bare Knuckle Fighting Championship held on December 18, 2021, in Thailand.

=== Background ===
In the main event, Tee Jay Chang and Fabiano Hawthorne and in the co-main event, Sirimongkol Singmanasak and Reza Goodary will face each other. Hawthorne later withdrew due to injury and was replaced by Keivan Soleimani.

=== Results ===
BKFC Thailand 1: The Game Changer
Weight Class				Method	Round	Time	Notes
Welterweight 75 kg	(Iran) Keivan Soleimani	def.	(England) Tee Jay Chang	KO (punches)	1	0:30	
Light heavyweight 84 kg	(Thailand) Sirimongkol Singmanasak	def.	(Iran) Reza Goodary	Decision (split)	5	2:00	Judges' scorecards not read.
Preliminary Card
Middleweight 80 kg	(Thailand) Boonsom Klinmee	def.	(Canada) Jonny Tello	Decision (split)	5	2:00	Judges' scorecards not read.
Featherweight 66 kg	(Thailand) Pongpisan Chunyong	def.	(England) Victor Booty	TKO (punches)	3	1:48	
Welterweight 75 kg	(Iran) Reza Ahmadnezhad	def.	(Thailand) Thoedsak Sinam	Decision (split)	5	2:00	Judges' scorecards not read.
Middleweight 80 kg	(Brazil) Jean Carlos Pereira	def.	(France) Johan Van De Hel	Decision (unanimous)	5	2:00	Judges' scorecards not read.
W.Strawweight 52 kg	(France) Souris Manfredi	def.	(Thailand) Saowaluk Nareepaengsri	KO (punch)	3	0:23	
Heavyweight 120 kg	(Iran) Arash Mardani	def.	(Russia) Zelemkhan Mukushev	TKO (retirement)	2	0:58	
Featherweight 66 kg	(Thailand) Sarun Srioumboo	def.	(Thailand) Pipat Mike Chaiporn	Decision (unanimous)	5	2:00	Judges' scorecards not read.
Featherweight 66 kg	(Thailand) Surasak Sukkhamcha	def.	(Kyrgyzstan) Ermek Kumachaev	Decision (unanimous)	5	2:00	Judges' scorecards not read.
Catchweight 53.5 kg	(Myanmar) Somiong War	def.	(Thailand) Surachat Srirod	KO (punch)	2	1:27	

== See also ==
- Bare Knuckle Fighting Championship
