= 2027 in Bare Knuckle Fighting Championship =

Information
- First date: January 24, 2027

Events

Fights

Chronology
2026 in BKFC	2027 in Bare Knuckle Fighting Championship

The year 2027 is the tenth year in the history of the Bare Knuckle Fighting Championship, a bare-knuckle fighting promotion based in Philadelphia.

== Background ==
The 2027 season will start with BKFSea Bruise Cruise: Stewart vs. Duran on January 24, 2027.

== List of events ==
#	Event	Date	Venue	Location
1	BKFSea Bruise Cruise: Stewart vs. Duran	January 23, 2027	Norwegian Jewel	The Bahamas

== BKFSea Bruise Cruise: Stewart vs. Duran ==
BKFSea Bruise Cruise: Stewart vs. Duran
- Promotion: Bare Knuckle Fighting Championship
- Date: January 23, 2027
- Venue: Norwegian Jewel
- City: The Bahamas

BKFSea Bruise Cruise: Stewart vs. Duran (also known as BKFSea 1) is an upcoming bare-knuckle fighting event to be held by Bare Knuckle Fighting Championship on January 23, 2027.

=== Background ===
A BKFC Featherweight Championship bout between current champion Kai Stewart and Bryan Duran is scheduled to headline the event.

Two fights were scheduled and cancelled for undisclosed reasons:

- An ironweight bout between Stephen Townsel and Brady Meister
- A flyweight bout bewteen Gustavo Balart and Justyn Martinez

=== Fight card ===
BKFSea Bruise Cruise: Stewart vs. Duran
Weight Class				Method	Round	Time	Notes
Featherweight 66 kg	(United States) Kai Stewart	vs.	(Cuba) Bryan Duran				For the BKFC Featherweight Championship.
Welterweight 75 kg	(United Kingdom) George Thorpe	vs.	(Australia) Josh Kuhne				
Featherweight 66 kg	(United States) Nathan Rivera	vs.	(United States) Brandon Meneses				
Ironweight 102 kg	(United States) Julio Perez Rodriguez	vs.	(United States) Gabriel Mota				
Featherweight 66 kg	(United States) Ramiro Figueroa	vs.	(Australia) Mick Whitehead				
Lightweight 70 kg	(United States) Famez	vs.	(United States) Josh Marer				
Featherweight 66 kg	(United States) Joey Gambino	vs.	(United States) Matt Denning				
Lightweight 70 kg	(United States) Cole Ferrell	vs.	(United States) Amos Collins				

== BKFC Fight Night Palm Desert: Kurdanov vs. Peralta ==
BKFC Fight Night Palm Desert: Kurdanov vs. Peralta
- Promotion: Bare Knuckle Fighting Championship
- Date: February 5, 2027
- Venue: Acrisure Arena
- City: Palm Desert, California

BKFC Fight Night Palm Desert: Kurdanov vs. Peralta was a bare-knuckle fighting event held by Bare Knuckle Fighting Championship on February 5, 2027.

=== Background ===
A bout between Abdulkarim Kurdanov and Robbie Peralta is scheduled to headline the event.

=== Fight card ===
BKFC Fight Night Palm Desert: Kurdanov vs. Peralta
Weight Class				Method	Round	Time	Notes
TBA	(Russia) Abdulkarim Kurdanov	vs.	(United States) Robbie Peralta				

== BKFC 99 Sheffield: Bonner vs. Franco ==
BKFC 99 Sheffield: Bonner vs. Franco
- Promotion: Bare Knuckle Fighting Championship
- Date: February 14, 2027
- Venue: Utilita Arena Sheffield
- City: Sheffield, England

BKFC 99 Sheffield: Bonner vs. Franco is an upcoming bare-knuckle fighting event to be held by Bare Knuckle Fighting Championship on February 14, 2027.

=== Background ===
A BKFC Lightweight Championship bout between current champion Ben Bonner and interim BKFC Welterweight Champion (also BKFC Europe Welterweight Champion Rico Franco is scheduled to headline the event.

A championship bout between Jimmy Sweeney and James Lilley is also scheduled to take place at the event.

=== Fight card ===
BKFC 99 Sheffield: Bonner vs. Franco
Weight Class				Method	Round	Time	Notes
Lightweight 70 kg	(United Kingdom) Ben Bonner (c)	vs.	(United States) Rico Franco				For the BKFC Lightweight Championship.
Lightweight 70 kg	(Republic of Ireland) Jimmy Sweeney	vs.	(United Kingdom) James Lilley				
