= Kai Stewart =

American bare-knuckle boxer and mixed martial artist (born 2000)

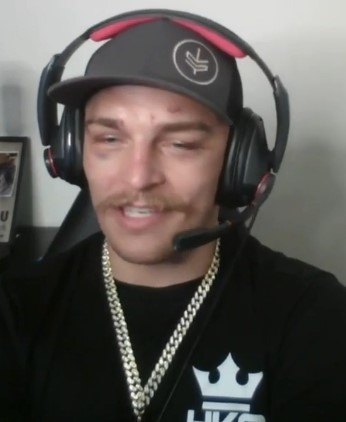
- Born: June 17, 2000 (age 26); Liberal, Kansas, United States
- Other names: King/Hefty Bag
- Height: 5 ft 8 in (1.73 m)
- Weight: 145 lb (66 kg; 10.4 st)
- Division: Welterweight (MMA); Featherweight (Bare-knuckle boxing)
- Fighting out of: Great Falls, Montana, United States
- Team: Flow State Athletics/Eaglestone Boxing club
- Years active: 2021–present (bare-knuckle boxing); 2022 (MMA)

Mixed martial arts record
- Total: 1
- Wins: 1
- By submission: 1
- Losses: 0

Bare-knuckle boxing record
- Total: 10
- Wins: 10
- By knockout: 2
- Losses: 0

Other information
- Mixed martial arts record from Sherdog

Kai Stewart (born June 17, 2000) is an American bare-knuckle boxer and mixed martial artist. He currently competes in the Bare Knuckle Fighting Championship in the featherweight division, where he is the current and inaugural BKFC Featherweight Champion. As a mixed martial artist, he has competed in the Featherweight division. As of August 29, 2026, he is #2 in the BKFC men's pound-for-pound rankings.

== Wrestling career ==
Kai Stewart attended Charles M. Russell High School, where he was a three-time Class AA Montana state finalist in wrestling, including a 138-lb state championship in 2018.

Stewart attended Minot State University in his first year, where he was a member of the MSU Beavers wrestling team. He compiled a 2-3 record as a freshman. He transferred to the University of Providence in his 2020 sophomore year.

== Mixed martial arts career ==
Stewart made his professional MMA career against Frank Meno on December 10, 2022, at Fusion Fight League's event, entitled Seasons Beatings Great Falls. He won the bout by rear-naked choke.

== Bare-knuckle boxing career ==
In his BKFC debut, Stewart faced Darrick Gates at BKFC Fight Night 1 on October 9, 2021. He won the fight via first-round knockout.

Stewart then faced Daniel Gary at BKFC 24 on April 30, 2022. He won the fight via first-round knockout.

Stewart next faced Rusty Crowder at BKFC 29 on September 10, 2022. He won the bout via split decision.

=== Featherweight champion ===
Stewart faced Louie Lopez for the inaugural BKFC Featherweight Championship at BKFC 44 on June 9, 2023. He won the bout by unanimous decision to win the championship. This fight earned him the Fight of the Night award.

In his first title defense, Stewart faced Howard Davis on December 2, 2023, at BKFC 56. He won the bout by unanimous decision. This fight earned him another Fight of the Night award.

Stewart defended his title against Bryan Duran on June 21, 2024 in the main event of BKFC 62. He won the bout by unanimous decision. This fight earned him another Fight of the Night award.

Stewart made the third successful defense of his BKFC featherweight title by unanimous decision against Jimmie Rivera on November 9, 2024 at BKFC on DAZN 2.

Stewart defended his title for the fourth time against undefeated contender Tommy Strydom on April 5, 2025 at BKFC 72 Dubai: Day 2. He won the fight by unanimous decision.

Stewart made the fifth defense of his BKFC featherweight title against current unbeaten BKFC Europe Featherweight Champion Nico Gaffie at BKFC 87 on March 20, 2026. He won the fight by unanimous decision.

Stewart made his sixth defense against Harry Gigliotti on August 29, 2026 at BKFC 92. He won the fight by unanimous decision.

Stewart is scheduled make his seventh defense against Bryan Duran on January 23, 2027 at BKFSea 1.

== Championships and accomplishments ==
- Bare Knuckle Fighting Championship
  - BKFC Featherweight World Champion (One time, current; inaugural)
    - Six successful title defenses
  - Fight of the Night (Three times) vs. Louie Lopez, Howard Davis and Bryan Duran
  - Youngest champion in BKFC history (22 years, 11 months old)

== Mixed martial arts record ==
Professional record breakdown
1 match	1 win	0 losses
By submission	1	0

Res.	Record	Opponent	Method	Event	Date	Round	Time	Location	Notes
Win	1–0	Frank Meno	Submission (rear-naked choke)	Fusion Fight League: Season Beatings Great Falls	December 10, 2022	2	4:20	Great Falls, Montana, United States	Lightweight debut.

== Bare knuckle record ==
Professional record breakdown
10 matches	10 wins	0 losses
By knockout	2	0
By decision	8	0

Res.	Record	Opponent	Method	Event	Date	Round	Time	Location	Notes
Win	10–0	Harry Gigliotti	Decision (unanimous)	BKFC 92	August 29, 2026	5	2:00	Boston, Massachusetts, United States	Defended the BKFC Featherweight Championship.
Win	9–0	Nico Gaffie	Decision (unanimous)	BKFC 87	March 20, 2026	5	2:00	Hollywood, Florida, United States	Defended the BKFC Featherweight Championship.
Win	8–0	Tommy Strydom	Decision (unanimous)	BKFC 72 Dubai: Day 2	April 5, 2025	5	2:00	Dubai, United Arab Emirates	Defended the BKFC Featherweight Championship.
Win	7–0	Jimmie Rivera	Decision (unanimous)	BKFC on DAZN Montana: Stewart vs. Rivera	November 9, 2024	5	2:00	Billings, Montana, United States	Defended the BKFC Featherweight Championship.
Win	6–0	Bryan Duran	Decision (unanimous)	BKFC 62	June 21, 2024	5	2:00	Hollywood, Florida, United States	Defended the BKFC Featherweight Championship. Fight of the Night.
Win	5–0	Howard Davis	Decision (unanimous)	BKFC 56	December 2, 2023	5	2:00	Salt Lake City, Utah, United States	Defended the BKFC Featherweight Championship. Fight of the Night.
Win	4–0	Louie Lopez	Decision (unanimous)	BKFC 44	June 9, 2023	5	2:00	Great Falls, Montana, United States	Won the inaugural BKFC Featherweight Championship. Fight of the Night.
Win	3–0	Rusty Crowder	Decision (split)	BKFC 29	September 10, 2022	5	2:00	Great Falls, Montana, United States	
Win	2–0	Daniel Gary	KO (punches)	BKFC 24	April 30, 2022	1	1:10	Great Falls, Montana, United States	
Win	1–0	Darrick Gates	TKO (punches)	BKFC Fight Night Montana: Riggs vs. Guillard	October 9, 2021	1	1:24	Billings, Montana, United States	
