= Mike Richman =

American mixed martial arts fighter

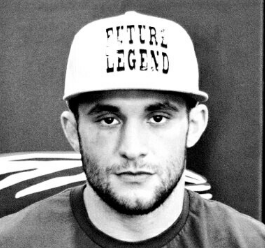
- Mike "The Marine" Richman
- Born: June 23, 1985 (age 41); Rosemount, Minnesota, United States
- Other names: The Marine
- Nationality: American
- Height: 5 ft 9 in (1.75 m)
- Weight: 174.1 lb (79.0 kg; 12.44 st)
- Division: Bantamweight; Featherweight; Lightweight; Light heavyweight (Bare-knuckle boxing); Middleweight (Bare-knuckle boxing)
- Reach: 71 in (180 cm)
- Stance: Southpaw
- Fighting out of: Rosemount, Minnesota, United States
- Team: The Academy
- Years active: 2008–present

Professional boxing record
- Total: 2
- Wins: 2
- By knockout: 1

Mixed martial arts record
- Total: 26
- Wins: 18
- By knockout: 9
- By submission: 7
- By decision: 2
- Losses: 8
- By knockout: 1
- By decision: 7

Other information
- Mixed martial arts record from Sherdog

Michael Richman (born June 23, 1985) is an American mixed martial artist and bare-knuckle boxer currently competing with Bare Knuckle Fighting Championship, where he is a former BKFC Light Heavyweight Champion. A professional competitor in mixed martial arts since 2008, Richman has competed for Bellator MMA, the Lightweight division of the Legacy Fighting Alliance, and is also 2-0 as a professional boxer.

As of April 13, 2026, he is #4 in the BKFC light heavyweight rankings.

== Background ==
Born and raised in Rosemount, Minnesota, began competing in wrestling from a young age and was also a fan of boxing and mixed martial arts. Richman attended Rosemount High School where he competed in wrestling before joining the United States Marine Corps upon graduating. After serving three tours as an infantryman in Iraq and reaching the rank of Sergeant, Richman began training in mixed martial arts in 2008.

== Mixed martial arts career ==
=== Early career ===
Richman made his professional debut in 2008 and compiled an undefeated record of 8-0 before competing on The Ultimate Fighter: Team GSP vs. Team Koscheck.

=== The Ultimate Fighter ===
Richman was one of 32 contestants selected to compete on The Ultimate Fighter: Team GSP vs. Team Koscheck. In his opening bout to get into the house, Richman lost to Aaron Wilkinson by unanimous decision after two rounds.

=== Bellator MMA ===
Richman made his Bellator MMA debut against WEC veteran Chris Horodecki at Bellator 64. In a huge upset, Richman won via KO at 1:23 of the first round.

After his win over Horodecki, Richman competed in the Bellator Season Seven Featherweight Tournament. In the quarterfinal round at Bellator 76, Richman defeated Jeremy Spoon via head KO 23 seconds into the first round. In the semifinals, he faced Shahbulat Shamhalaev and lost via brutal KO in the first round.

Richman proved he was the superior fighter in his Bellator 88 Featherweight Tournament Quarterfinal bout against Mitch Jackson. Richman won a decisive first-round TKO victory. Richman dominated Jackson on his feet, dropping him three times with short left hooks.

Richman faced Alexandre Bezerra in the semifinals on March 7, 2013 at Bellator 92. He won the bout via split decision.

Richman faced Magomedrasul Khasbulaev in the Bellator Featherweight Tournament Final on April 4, 2013 in Atlantic City. He lost the fight via unanimous decision.

Richman faced Akop Stepanyan at Bellator 106 on November 2, 2013. Richman had been in trouble early in the fight, but floored Stepanyan with a left hook in the first round. He then faced Desmond Green at Bellator 110 in the quarter-finals of the Featherweight Tournament. Richman lost via unanimous decision.

Richman faced Goiti Yamauchi on May 17, 2014 at Bellator 120. He lost the back-and-forth fight via unanimous decision.

In the fall of 2014, Richman moved down to the bantamweight division. He debuted at 135 against Ed West at Bellator 126 on September 26, 2014. He won the fight via knockout in the first round. He also made his signature 'walk-off knockout', where he backs off the fighter before referee called stoppage on the fight.

Richman faced promotional newcomer Nam Phan at Bellator 131 on November 15, 2014. He won the fight via knockout in the first round.

Richman was expected to face former Bellator Bantamweight Champion Eduardo Dantas at Bellator 135 on March 27, 2015. However, the bout was removed from the fight card after Richman suffered an undisclosed injury. The fight eventually took place at Bellator 137 on May 15, 2015. Richman lost the back-and-forth fight by unanimous decision.

On June 9, 2015 the California State Athletic Commission confirmed that Richman had failed a post fight drug test following his fight against Eduardo Dantas at Bellator 137. He tested positive for performance-enhancing drugs according to CSAC Executive Director Andy Foster and will be suspended two years and fined $2,500 for the rule infraction.

== Bare-knuckle boxing ==
=== BKB ===
Following his suspension from mixed martial arts, Richman ventured into bare-knuckle boxing. At the time, the sport was still illegal in the United States so he traveled to the United Kingdom for his first fight under the BKB promotion on June 9, 2018.

=== Valor Bare Knuckle ===
Richman had his first bare-knuckle fight on US soil at Valor Bare Knuckle 1 on September 21, 2019. His fight with JC Llamas ended in a no contest after an accidental headbutt inflicted a cut above Llamas' eye and rendered him unable to continue.

=== Bare Knuckle Fighting Championship ===
Richman made his Bare Knuckle Fighting Championship debut against Marcel Stamps on April 30, 2021 at BKFC 17. He won by first-round technical knockout via shoulder injury.

He next faced Dakota Cochrane on September 10, 2021 at BKFC 21, whom he defeated by second-round knockout.

Richman faced David Rickels on April 8, 2022 at BKFC 23, winning by second-round knockout.

==== Interim BKFC Light Heavyweight Champion ====
After three consecutive victories, Richman was set to face Isaac Doolitle for the interim BKFC Light Heavyweight Championship on October 15, 2022 at BKFC 31. He won the fight and interim title via third-round knockout.

As interim champion, Richman was scheduled to face reigning champion Lorenzo Hunt in a title unification bout at KnuckleMania 3 on February 17, 2023. Despite knocking Hunt down in the first round, Richman was knocked out and suffered the first loss of his bare-knuckle boxing career.

==== Post championship ====
Richman challenged David Mundell for the BKFC Middleweight Championship at BKFC 47 on July 14, 2023. He lost the fight via knockout in the second round. Afterwards, Richman announced his retirement.

Richman came out of retirement to face Erick Lozano on April 12, 2024 at BKFC Fight Night 13 in the main event. He won the bout in the fifth round by knockout.

==== BKFC Light Heavyweight Champion ====
Richman challenged Jared Warren for the BKFC Light Heavyweight Championship at BKFC on DAZN 3 on December 21, 2024. He won the fight and championship by knockout in the first round. This fight earned him his first Knockout of the Night award.

Richman made his first defense of his light heavyweight title against Josh Dyer at BKFC 74 on May 10, 2025. He lost the fight and championship by technical knockout in the fourth round.

==== Post championship ====
Richman faced Joe Elmore on February 7, 2026 at BKFC Knucklemania VI. He won the fight by majority decision.

Richman faced John Garbarino on July 3, 2026 at BKFC Liberty Brawl. He lost the fight by unanimous decision.

Richman is scheduled to face Dustin Pague in the main event on December 4, 2026 at BKFC Fight Night 50.

== Championships and accomplishments ==
- Bare Knuckle Fighting Championship
  - BKFC Light Heavyweight Champion (One time)
  - Interim BKFC Light Heavyweight Champion (One time)
  - Knockout of the Night (One time) vs. Jared Warren
- Bellator Fighting Championships
  - Bellator Season Eight Featherweight Tournament Runner-Up

== Mixed martial arts record ==
Professional record breakdown
26 matches	18 wins	8 losses
By knockout	9	1
By submission	7	0
By decision	2	7

Res.	Record	Opponent	Method	Event	Date	Round	Time	Location	Notes
Loss	18-8	Jeff Peterson	Decision (unanimous)	Legacy Fighting Alliance 29	December 15, 2017	3	5:00	Prior Lake, Minnesota, United States	Moved up to Lightweight.
Loss	18-7	Lazar Stojadinovic	Decision (unanimous)	Legacy Fighting Alliance 2	January 20, 2017	3	5:00	Prior Lake, Minnesota, United States	Moved up to Featherweight.
Loss	18–6	Eduardo Dantas	Decision (unanimous)	Bellator 137	May 15, 2015	3	5:00	Temecula, California, United States	Tested positive for banned substances in post-fight drug test.
Win	18–5	Nam Phan	KO (punches)	Bellator 131	November 15, 2014	1	0:46	San Diego, California, United States	
Win	17–5	Ed West	KO (punches)	Bellator 126	September 26, 2014	1	2:44	Phoenix, Arizona, United States	Bantamweight debut.
Loss	16–5	Goiti Yamauchi	Decision (unanimous)	Bellator 120	May 17, 2014	3	5:00	Southaven, Mississippi, United States	
Loss	16–4	Desmond Green	Decision (unanimous)	Bellator 110	February 28, 2014	3	5:00	Uncasville, Connecticut, United States	Bellator Season 10 Featherweight Tournament Quarterfinal.
Win	16–3	Akop Stepanyan	TKO (punches)	Bellator 106	November 2, 2013	1	4:05	Long Beach, California, United States	
Loss	15–3	Magomedrasul Khasbulaev	Decision (unanimous)	Bellator 95	April 4, 2013	3	5:00	Atlantic City, New Jersey, United States	Bellator Season Eight Featherweight Tournament Final.
Win	15–2	Alexandre Bezerra	Decision (split)	Bellator 92	March 7, 2013	3	5:00	Temecula, California, United States	Bellator Season Eight Featherweight Tournament Semifinal.
Win	14–2	Mitch Jackson	TKO (head kick and punches)	Bellator 88	February 7, 2013	1	4:57	Duluth, Georgia, United States	Bellator Season Eight Featherweight Tournament Quarterfinal.
Loss	13–2	Shahbulat Shamhalaev	KO (punches)	Bellator 79	November 2, 2012	1	1:45	Rama, Ontario, Canada	Bellator Season Seven Featherweight Tournament Semifinal.
Win	13–1	Jeremy Spoon	KO (head kick and punch)	Bellator 76	October 12, 2012	1	0:23	Windsor, Ontario, Canada	Bellator Season Seven Featherweight Tournament Quarterfinal.
Win	12–1	Chris Horodecki	KO (punches)	Bellator 64	April 6, 2012	1	1:23	Windsor, Ontario, Canada	
Win	11–1	Morgan Sickinger	Decision (unanimous)	Driller Promotions / SEG: Downtown Showdown 1	November 26, 2011	3	5:00	Minneapolis, Minnesota, United States	
Win	10–1	Christopher Lane	TKO (punches)	Riot at the Hyatt: Packer vs. Viking	September 23, 2011	1	1:43	Minneapolis, Minnesota, United States	
Loss	9–1	Brian Pearman	Decision (split)	Seconds Out / Vivid MMA: Showdown at the Sheraton 2	February 26, 2011	3	5:00	Bloomington, Minnesota, United States	
Win	9–0	Mike Lindquist	Submission (rear-naked choke)	Seconds Out / Vivid MMA: Combat on Capital Hill 4	November 12, 2010	1	1:14	Saint Paul, Minnesota, United States	
Win	8–0	Ryan Stock	TKO (punches)	Seconds Out / Vivid MMA: Tour of Duty 1	February 27, 2010	1	1:14	Saint Paul, Minnesota, United States	
Win	7–0	Derek Getzel	Submission (anaconda choke)	Ambition Promotions: The Crucible	September 12, 2009	1	3:36	Saint Paul, Minnesota, United States	
Win	6–0	Wes Ronchi	Submission (triangle choke)	Brutaal: Fight Night	June 3, 2009	2	0:42	Shakopee, Minnesota, United States	
Win	5–0	Chris Coplan	Submission (rear-naked choke)	Brutaal: Fight Night	February 13, 2009	1	3:07	Shakopee, Minnesota, United States	
Win	4–0	Deryck Ripley	Submission	Brutaal: Fight Night	December 5, 2008	1	4:50	Shakopee, Minnesota, United States	
Win	3–0	Mel Ott	Submission (armbar)	Brutaal: Fight Night	September 5, 2008	1	1:10	Shakopee, Minnesota, United States	
Win	2–0	Rob Degroot	Submission (armbar)	Brutaal: Fight Night	June 27, 2008	1	0:48	Shakopee, Minnesota, United States	
Win	1–0	Jason Trett	TKO (punches)	Brutaal: Fight Night	April 25, 2008	1	1:45	Shakopee, Minnesota, United States	

== Bare knuckle boxing record ==
Professional record breakdown
13 matches	8 wins	4 losses
By knockout	7	3
By decision	1	1
No contests	1	

Res.	Record	Opponent	Method	Event	Date	Round	Time	Location	Notes
Loss	8–4 (1)	John Garbarino	Decision (unanimous)	BKFC Liberty Brawl	July 3, 2026	5	2:00	Philadelphia, Pennsylvania, United States	
Win	8–3 (1)	Joe Elmore	Decision (majority)	BKFC Knucklemania VI	February 7, 2026	5	2:00	Philadelphia, Pennsylvania	
Loss	7–3 (1)	Josh Dyer	TKO	BKFC 74	May 10, 2025	4	0:58	West Valley City, Utah, United States	Lost the BKFC Light Heavyweight Championship.
Win	7–2 (1)	Jared Warren	KO (punch)	BKFC on DAZN Hollywood, FL: Warren vs. Richman	December 21, 2024	1	0:44	Hollywood, Florida, United States	Won the BKFC Light Heavyweight Championship.
Win	6–2 (1)	Erick Lozano	KO (punch)	BKFC Fight Night Clearwater: Richman vs. Lozano	April 12, 2024	5	0:53	Clearwater, Florida, United States	
Loss	5–2 (1)	David Mundell	KO (punch)	BKFC 47	July 14, 2023	2	1:54	Lakeland, Florida, United States	For the BKFC Middleweight Championship.
Loss	5–1 (1)	Lorenzo Hunt	KO (punch)	BKFC KnuckleMania 3	February 17, 2023	1	1:50	Albuquerque, New Mexico, United States	For the undisputed BKFC Light Heavyweight Championship.
Win	5–0 (1)	Isaac Doolittle	KO (punch)	BKFC 31	October 15, 2022	3	1:35	Broomfield, Colorado, United States	Won the interim BKFC Light Heavyweight Championship. Return to Light Heavyweight.
Win	4–0 (1)	David Rickels	KO (punch)	BKFC 23	April 8, 2022	2	0:32	Wichita, Kansas, United States	Middleweight debut. BKFC Middleweight title eliminator.
Win	3–0 (1)	Dakota Cochrane	KO (punch)	BKFC 21	September 10, 2021	2	0:37	Omaha, Nebraska, United States	
Win	2–0 (1)	Marcel Stamps	KO (punch)	BKFC 17	April 30, 2021	1	1:06	Birmingham, Alabama, United States	
NC	1–0 (1)	JC Llamas	NC (accidental headbutt)	Valor Bare Knuckle 1	September 21, 2019	1	3:00	New Town, North Dakota, United States	Accidental headbutt rendered Llamas unable to continue.
Win	1–0	Marcus Gaines	TKO	BKB 11	June 9, 2018	2	N/A	London, England, United States	

== See also ==
- List of Bellator MMA alumni
- List of male mixed martial artists
