= Lorenzo Hunt =

American mixed martial artist and bare-knuckle boxer (born 1982)

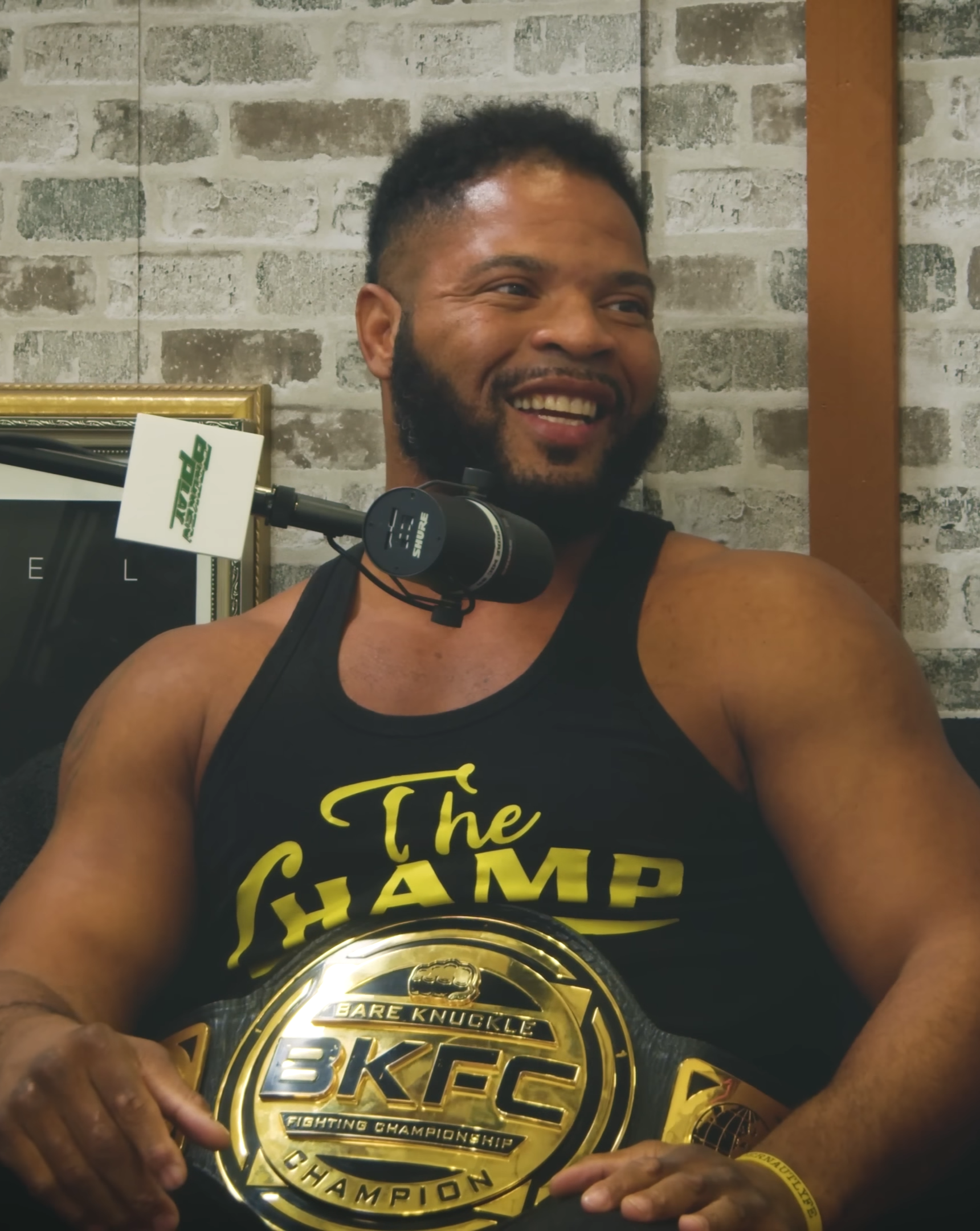
- Hunt in 2023
- Born: September 9, 1982 (age 44); Elyria, Ohio, United States
- Other names: The Juggernaut
- Nationality: American
- Height: 6 ft 0 in (183 cm)
- Weight: 196 lb (89 kg; 14 st 0 lb)
- Division: Middleweight; Light heavyweight
- Reach: 75 in (191 cm)
- Fighting out of: St. Augustine, Florida, United States
- Team: Team Deadgame
- Years active: 2015–2018 (MMA); 2019-present (Bare-knuckle boxing)

Mixed martial arts record
- Total: 8
- Wins: 3
- By knockout: 3
- Losses: 5
- By submission: 4
- By decision: 1

Bare-knuckle boxing record
- Total: 16
- Wins: 14
- By knockout: 12
- Losses: 2
- By knockout: 2

Other information
- Mixed martial arts record from Sherdog

Lorenzo Hunt (born September 9, 1982) is an American mixed martial artist and bare-knuckle boxer. He currently competes in the Bare Knuckle Fighting Championship, where he is the current two-time BKFC Light Heavyweight Champion and Ironweight Champion as well as former Cruiserweight Champion. A professional bare-knuckle fighter since 2019, Hunt has also competed for BYB Extreme Fighting Series. As of july 17th 2026, he is #1 in the BKFC men's pound-for-pound rankings.

== Mixed martial arts career ==
Hunt started his professional MMA career in 2015. Throughout his career, he compiled a 3-5 professional record.

== Bare-knuckle boxing career ==
At BKFC 18 on 26 June 2021, Hunt interrupted the post-fight interview of Cruiserweight Champion Héctor Lombard, resulting in Lombard punching Hunt in the face twice, initiating a minor brawl.

=== BKFC Light Heavyweight Champion ===
Hunt then faced Lombard for the light heavyweight title at BKFC 22 on 12 November 2021. He ended up winning the title via unanimous decision.

In his first light heavyweight title defense, Hunt face Joe Riggs at BKFC 24 on April 30, 2022. He won the bout by second-round knockout.

=== Double champion ===
Hunt faced Quentin Henry for the vacant cruiserweight championship at BKFC 30 on October 1, 2022. He won the bout by knockout in the third round to win the title, making him the second two-division champion in BKFC history.

Hunt was scheduled to face interim light heavyweight champion Mike Richman in a title unification bout at KnuckleMania 3 on February 17, 2023. Despite being knocked down in the first round, Hunt knocked out Richman and unified the titles.

In his first cruiserweight title defense, Hunt faced Chris Camozzi at BKFC 50 on September 22, 2023. He won the bout by split decision.

In an attempt to be a triple-champ with the organization, Hunt competed for the BKFC Heavyweight World Championship against Mick Terrill at BKFC Knucklemania IV in Los Angeles on April 27, 2024. Hunt lost by technical knockout after being knocked down by an uppercut which led Hunt to fall and injure his elbow.

=== Suspension ===
On June 26, 2024, it was reported that Hunt was fined 40 percent of his purse associated with his BKFC: Knucklemania IV bout on April 27, 2024 and suspended for eighteen months by the California State Athletic Commission (CSAC) due to testing positive for banned substances.

=== Return ===
Hunt was scheduled to compete for the BKFC Cruiserweight Championship in a rematch against current champion Chris Camozzi on April 26, 2025 at BKFC 73 in the main event. However, on April 12, 2025, it was announced that Hunt had to withdraw due to being injured in training, so he was replaced by Andrea Bicchi.

Hunt challenged Josh Dyer for his BKFC light heavyweight title in a rematch, headlining BKFC 84 on November 15, 2025, at Acrisure Arena in Palm Desert, CA. Hunt won the championship by knockout in the first round.

Hunt was scheduled to face former UFC Middleweight Championship challenger Yoel Romero on February 7, 2026 at BKFC Knucklemania VI. On January 27, 2026, it was announced that Romero had withdrawn due to illness and was replaced by David Mundell. Hunt won the fight by knockout in the fourth round. This fight earned him his first Knockout of the Night award.

Hunt faced undefeated prospect Walter Pugliesi on July 18, 2026 for the inaugural BKFC Ironweight Championship at BKFC 91. He won the fight by knockout in the fourth round.

== Championships and accomplishments ==
- Bare Knuckle Fighting Championship
  - BKFC Ironweight World Champion (One time, current)
  - BKFC Cruiserweight World Champion (One time)
    - One successful defense
  - BKFC Light Heavyweight World Champion (Two times, current)
    - Two successful defenses
  - Police Gazette World Light Heavyweight Championship
  - Second simultaneous multi-division champion in BKFC history (Light heavyweight, Cruiserweight)
  - Tied (Luis Palomino) for longest win streak in BKFC history (9)
  - Only fighter in BKFC to defend belts in two divisions
  - Knockout of the Night (One time) vs. David Mundell
  - Knockout of the Year (2023) (vs. Mike Richman)

== Mixed martial arts record ==
Professional record breakdown
8 matches	3 wins	5 losses
By knockout	3	0
By submission	0	4
By decision	0	1

Res.	Record	Opponent	Method	Event	Date	Round	Time	Location	Notes
Loss	3–5	Joe Pyfer	Technical Submission (rear-naked choke)	Art of War Cage Fighting 8	October 5, 2018	1	3:47	Philadelphia, Pennsylvania, United States	
Win	3–4	Ahmad Hollis	KO (punches)	RFC 41: War	November 3, 2017	1	3:22	Tampa, Florida, United States	
Loss	2–4	Michael Lombardo	Decision (unanimous)	Titan FC 44	May 19, 2017	3	5:00	Pembroke Pines, Florida, United States	
Loss	2–3	Brad Taylor	Submission (rear-naked choke)	RFC 38: Undisputed	November 11, 2016	2	2:20	Tampa, Florida, United States	
Loss	2–2	Joseph Creer	Submission (rear-naked choke)	Conflict MMA 39	July 30, 2016	1	4:11	Charleston, South Carolina, United States	
Win	2–1	Brad Taylor	TKO (punches)	RFC 37: No Mercy	July 22, 2016	1	3:47	Tampa, Florida, United States	
Loss	1–1	John Garcia	Submission (armbar)	RFC 36	February 26, 2016	2	1:17	Tampa, Florida, United States	
Win	1–0	Garrick James	KO (punch)	RFC 35	November 13, 2015	2	0:29	Tampa, Florida, United States	

== Bare-knuckle boxing record ==
Professional record breakdown
16 matches	14 wins	2 losses
By knockout	12	2
By decision	2	0

Res.	Record	Opponent	Method	Event	Date	Round	Time	Location	Notes
Win	14–2	Walter Pugliesi	KO	BKFC 91	July 18, 2026	4	1:09	Naples, Italy	For the inaugural BKFC Ironweight Championship.
Win	13–2	David Mundell	KO	BKFC Knucklemania VI	February 7, 2026	4	0:29	Philadelphia, Pennsylvania	Catchweight (199 lb) bout. Knockout of the Night.
Win	12–2	Josh Dyer	KO	BKFC 84	November 15, 2025	1	1:59	Thousand Palms, California, United States	Won the BKFC Light Heavyweight World Championship.
Loss	11–2	Mick Terrill	TKO (injury)	BKFC Knucklemania IV	April 27, 2024	1	1:48	Los Angeles, California, United States	For the BKFC Heavyweight Championship.
Win	11–1	Chris Camozzi	Decision (split)	BKFC 50	September 22, 2023	5	2:00	Denver, Colorado, United States	Defended the BKFC Cruiserweight Championship.
Win	10–1	Mike Richman	KO	BKFC KnuckleMania 3	February 17, 2023	1	1:50	Albuquerque, New Mexico, United States	Defended the BKFC Light Heavyweight Championship. Knockout of the Year.
Win	9–1	Quentin Henry	KO	BKFC 30	October 21, 2022	3	1:36	Monroe, Louisiana, United States	Won the vacant BKFC Cruiserweight Championship.
Win	8–1	Joe Riggs	KO	BKFC 24	April 30, 2022	2	1:12	Great Falls, Montana, United States	Defended the BKFC Light Heavyweight Championship.
Win	7–1	Hector Lombard	Decision (unanimous)	BKFC 22	November 12, 2021	5	2:00	Miami, Florida, United States	Won the inaugural BKFC Light Heavyweight Championship.
Win	6–1	Josh Dyer	TKO	BKFC 17	April 30, 2021	5	0:52	Birmingham, Alabama, United States	
Win	5–1	Rob Morrow	KO	BKFC Knucklemania	February 5, 2021	4	2:00	Lakeland, Florida, United States	
Win	4–1	Davian Green	TKO	BKFC 14	November 13, 2020	2	0:49	Miami, Florida, United States	
Win	3–1	Erick Lozano	KO	BKFC 12	September 11, 2020	3	1:58	Daytona Beach, Florida, United States	Knockout of the Night.
Loss	2–1	Gustavo Trujillo	TKO	BKFC 10	February 15, 2020	1	1:01	Fort Lauderdale, Florida, United States	
Win	2–0	Reggie Peña	TKO (doctor stoppage)	BKFC 8	October 19, 2019	3	2:00	Biloxi, Mississippi, United States	
Win	1–0	Sabrina Brown	KO	BYB 2: Brawl for It All	April 5, 2019	5	3:00	Cheyenne, Wyoming, United States	
