= David Mundell (fighter) =

American mixed martial artist and bare-knuckle boxer (born 1991)

- Born: August 1, 1991 (age 35); Oldsmar, Florida, United States
- Other names: Redneck
- Height: 5 ft 9 in (1.75 m)
- Weight: 173 lb (78 kg; 12.4 st)
- Division: Light heavyweight; Middleweight; Welterweight
- Reach: 75 in (190 cm)
- Fighting out of: Dunedin, Florida, United States
- Team: Shift MMA
- Years active: 2014–2019 (MMA); 2019–present (bare-knuckle boxing)

Mixed martial arts record
- Total: 15
- Wins: 10
- By knockout: 1
- By submission: 2
- By decision: 7
- Losses: 5
- By knockout: 3
- By submission: 1
- By decision: 1

Bare-knuckle boxing record
- Total: 12
- Wins: 10
- By knockout: 7
- Losses: 2
- By knockout: 1

Other information
- Mixed martial arts record from Sherdog

David Mundell (born August 1, 1991) is an American mixed martial artist and bare-knuckle boxer. He currently competes in the middleweight division of Bare Knuckle Fighting Championship, where he is the current BKFC Middleweight Champion. A professional mixed martial arts competitor from 2014 to 2019, he has fought in Bellator, Cage Fury Fighting Championships and the Titan Fighting Championships. As of August 29, 2026, he is #3 in the BKFC men's pound-for-pound rankings.

== Mixed martial arts career ==
Mundell started his professional MMA career in 2014 and competed until 2019. Throughout his career, he compiled a 10-5 professional record.

Mundell faced Ed Ruth at Bellator 178 on April 21, 2017, replacing Aaron Goodwine. He lost the fight via technical knockout in the second round.

== Bare-knuckle boxing career ==
In his BKFC debut, Mundell faced Drew Lipton at BKFC 6 on June 22, 2019. He won the bout by first-round TKO.

Mundell then faced Ronnie Forney on October 19, 2019, at BKFC 8. He won the bout by first-round TKO.

Mundell faced Héctor Lombard on February 15, 2020, at BKFC 10, replacing Joe Hunt who was originally scheduled to face Lombard. Mundell lost the bout via unanimous decision.

Mundell faced Stanislav Grosu at BKFC Fight Night 4 on December 9, 2021. He won the bout via unanimous decision.

Mundell faced Julian Lane on May 6, 2022, at BKFC 25. He won the bout by unanimous decision.

Mundell faced David Simpson on July 23, 2022, at BKFC Fight Night 10. He won the bout by fifth-round TKO, earning him a Knockout of the Night award in the process.

Mundell faced interim champion Francesco Ricchi for the vacant BKFC middleweight title on December 3, 2022, at BKFC 34. He won the bout by knockout to win the title.

In his first title defense, Mundell faced Mike Richman at BKFC 47 on July 14, 2023. He won the bout via knockout in the second round.

Mundell faced Doug Coltrane on November 3, 2023, at BKFC 53. He won the bout by second-round TKO to defend the title.

Mundell was scheduled to face former Strikeforce Light Heavyweight Champion, Rizin Heavyweight Grand Prix Champion and Bellator MMA Light Heavyweight World Championship challenger "King Mo" Muhammed Lawal on September 13, 2024, at BKFC 66. However, Lawal withdrew from the bout for unknown reasons.

Mundell defended his title against Danny Christie on October 12, 2024, at BKFC on DAZN: Tenaglia vs. Soto. He won the fight by technical knockout in the second round.

Mundell made his fourth defense of his BKFC Middleweight title against Donald Sanchez at BKFC 75 in Albuquerque, NM, on June 6, 2025. He won the fight by unanimous decision.

Mundell is scheduled to compete for the BKFC Light Heavyweight Championship against current champion Josh Dyer on November 15, 2025, at BKFC 84. However, for unknown reasons, Mundell was replaced by Lorenzo Hunt.

Replacing Yoel Romero who fell ill, Mundell faced Lorenzo Hunt in a 199 lb catchweight bout on February 7, 2026, at BKFC Knucklemania VI. Mundell lost the fight knockout in the fourth round.

Mundell is scheduled to defend his middleweight title against Jack Cullen on September 26, 2026 at BKFC 94.

== Championships and accomplishments ==
=== Bare-knuckle boxing ===
- Bare Knuckle Fighting Championship
  - BKFC Middleweight World Champion (One time, current)
    - Four successful title defenses
  - Knockout of the Night (One time) vs. David Simpson.

=== Mixed martial arts ===
- Real Fighting Championships
  - RFC Welterweight Championship (One time)

== Mixed martial arts record ==
Professional record breakdown
15 matches	10 wins	5 losses
By knockout	1	3
By submission	2	1
By decision	7	1

Res.	Record	Opponent	Method	Event	Date	Round	Time	Location	Notes
Loss	10–5	Joey Pierotti	Decision (unanimous)	Cage Fury FC 72	February 16, 2019	3	5:00	Atlantic City, New Jersey, United States	
Win	10–4	Marcos Lloreda	Decision (unanimous)	Combat Quest 3	January 25, 2019	3	5:00	Tampa, Florida, United States	Welterweight bout.
Loss	9–4	Doug Usher	KO (punches)	Road to M-1: USA	August 11, 2018	2	0:00	Nashville, Tennessee, United States	
Win	9–3	Elijah Gbollie	Decision (unanimous)	Battleground MMA	June 16, 2016	3	5:00	Largo, Florida, United States	
Win	8–3	Brad Taylor	Decision (unanimous)	Real FC 41	November 3, 2017	3	5:00	Tampa, Florida, United States	Return to Middleweight.
Win	7–3	Michael Lombardo	Decision (unanimous)	V3 Fights 61	August 19, 2017	3	5:00	Tampa, Florida, United States	Light heavyweight debut.
Loss	6–3	Ed Ruth	TKO (knee to the body)	Bellator 178	April 21, 2017	1	2:38	Uncasville, Connecticut, United States	
Loss	6–2	Preston Parsons	Submission (armbar)	Titan FC 42	December 2, 2016	1	4:10	Coral Gables, Florida, United States	Welterweight bout.
Win	6–1	Jarod Lawton	Decision (unanimous)	New England Fights: Dana White Looking For A Fight	August 5, 2016	3	5:00	Bangor, Maine, United States	Middleweight debut.
Loss	5–1	Mike Perry	KO (punches)	Battleground: Perry vs. Mundell	May 14, 2016	2	4:10	Kissimmee, Florida, United States	
Win	5–0	Travis Cox	Submission (armbar)	Real FC 36	February 26, 2016	1	4:59	Tampa, Florida, United States	
Loss	4–0	Brad Taylor	Decision (unanimous)	Real FC 33	March 6, 2015	3	5:00	Tampa, Florida, United States	Won the RFC Welterweight Championship.
Win	3–0	Juan Marrero	TKO (punches)	Real FC 31	July 11, 2014	2	4:30	Tampa, Florida, United States	
Win	2–0	Rance Jones	Decision (unanimous)	Atlas Fights: Battle on the Mobile Bay	April 12, 2014	3	5:00	Mobile, Alabama, United States	
Win	1–0	Jeremie Cook	TKO (punches)	Real FC 30	February 28, 2014	1	0:17	Tampa, Florida, United States	Welterweight debut.

== Bare-knuckle boxing record ==
Professional record breakdown
12 matches	10 wins	2 losses
By knockout	7	1
By decision	3	1

Res.	Record	Opponent	Method	Event	Date	Round	Time	Location	Notes
Loss	10–2	Lorenzo Hunt	KO	BKFC Knucklemania VI	February 7, 2026	4	0:29	Philadelphia, Pennsylvania	Catchweight bout.
Win	10–1	Donald Sanchez	Decision (unanimous)	BKFC 75	June 6, 2025	5	2:00	Albuquerque, New Mexico, United States	Defended the BKFC Middleweight Championship.
Win	9–1	Danny Christie	TKO	BKFC on DAZN: Tenaglia vs. Soto	October 12, 2024	2	0:55	Marbella, Spain	Defended the BKFC Middleweight Championship.
Win	8–1	Doug Coltrane	KO	BKFC 53	November 3, 2023	2	1:23	Orlando, Florida, United States	Defended the BKFC Middleweight Championship.
Win	7–1	Mike Richman	KO	BKFC 47	July 14, 2023	2	1:54	Lakeland, Florida, United States	Defended the BKFC Middleweight Championship.
Win	6–1	Francesco Ricchi	KO (punch)	BKFC 34	December 3, 2022	3	1:48	Hollywood, Florida, United States	Middleweight debut. Won the vacant BKFC Middleweight Championship.
Win	5–1	David Simpson	TKO (punches)	BKFC Fight Night Tampa 2: Grant vs. Barnett	July 23, 2022	5	1:08	Tampa, Florida, United States	Knockout of the Night.
Win	4–1	Julian Lane	Decision (unanimous)	BKFC 25	May 6, 2022	5	2:00	Orlando, Florida, United States	
Win	3–1	Stanislav Grosu	Decision (unanimous)	BKFC Fight Night Tampa: Brown vs. Taylor	December 9, 2021	5	2:00	Tampa, Florida, United States	Return to light heavyweight.
Loss	2–1	Héctor Lombard	Decision (unanimous)	BKFC 10	February 15, 2020	5	2:00	Fort Lauderdale, Florida, United States	Cruiserweight debut.
Win	2–0	Ronnie Forney	TKO (punches)	BKFC 8: Silva vs. Gonzaga	October 19, 2019	2	1:09	Tampa, Florida, United States	
Win	1–0	Drew Lipton	TKO (punches)	BKFC 6	April 5, 2019	1	1:35	Tampa, Florida, United States	Light heavyweight debut.
