= Fair Expo Center =

Convention center in Miami, Florida

Coordinates: 25.748163°N 80.372002°W

The Fair Expo Center is a convention center located in the neighborhood of University Park in Westchester, an unincorporated area of western Miami-Dade County, Florida, adjacent to the campus of Florida International University. It has been built in stages since 1952. The center's main entrance features four meeting rooms totaling 5,950 square feet (553 m^{2}) of space.

== Arnold Hall ==
The flagship facility of the complex is the 77,940-square-foot (7,241 m^{2}) Arnold Hall, which seats up to 7,460 for many events, including concerts, sporting events, banquets, etc. It's also used for trade shows. There is also a box office, an in-house restaurant, a state-of-the-art sound system, a meeting room seating up to 125, and public restrooms.

== Edwards Hall ==
Edwards Hall features 35,581 square feet (3,306 m^{2}) of unobstructed space and seats up to 5,083 fans. It is air-conditioned and also contains a sound system. It is used for trade shows, conventions, and sporting events. Both venues have a ceiling height of no more than 20 feet (6 m).

== Sunshine Pavilion ==
The Sunshine Pavilion was built in 2000 and can hold up to 6,920. It contains 49,000 square feet (4,600 m^{2}) of meeting space, two food service areas, a ceiling height of 28 feet (9 m), a modern sound system and air conditioning, and a covered walkway to Arnold Hall. It is used for trade shows, meetings and other events.

== Goode Building ==
The Goode Building contains two meeting rooms totaling 9,600 square feet (890 m^{2}).

== FairExpo Center ==
The FairExpo Center is the site of the annual Miami-Dade County Fair & Exposition, and is also used for recreational events. In 1992 it housed 3,000 National Guard troops following Hurricane Andrew. It even processed Cuban refugees during the Mariel boatlift.
