= Royal Cliff Hotels Group =

Hotel group in Thailand

Coordinates: 12°55′24″N 100°51′35″E

- Interactive map of the Royal Cliff Hotels Group area

General information
- Location: Pattaya, Thailand
- Opening: 1973

Design and construction
- Awards and prizes: 215

Other information
- Number of rooms: 1090
- Number of restaurants: 11

The Royal Cliff Hotels Group consists of 4 luxury hotels and a multipurpose convention centre, Pattaya Exhibition and Convention Hall (PEACH) between Jomtien and South Pattaya, Thailand, occupying 64 acres (26 ha) of parkland overlooking the eastern shore of the Gulf of Thailand. The 5 star hotels on the private estate are Royal Cliff Beach Hotel, Royal Cliff Beach Terrace, Royal Cliff Grand Hotel and Royal Wing Suites & Spa.

== History ==
In 1973, Royal Cliff Beach Terrace opened with 106 rooms and a year after the Royal Cliff Beach Hotel came into existence. A decade later the Royal Wing Suites & Spa was officially opened by the King of Thailand Maha Vajiralongkorn. In 1992, the Royal Cliff Grand Hotel was opened by the 16th Prime Minister of Thailand, Prem Tinsulanonda.

Late in 1999, a major addition was made to the resort's meeting, incentive, convention and exhibition facilities. This was the multipurpose stand–alone meeting venue, Pattaya Exhibition and Convention Hall, with the capacity of catering to up to 10,000 delegates.

Royal Cliff Hotels have been the setting for some important meetings and events in the region, In 1991, the resort played host to the Cambodian Peace talks; in 1997, the hotel was the venue for the drafting of the new Thai constitution; and in 2003, it hosted the APEC Tourism Working Group, attended by senior tourism officials from 21 member countries.

In April 2009, an ASEAN summit had to be canceled unexpectedly and immediately, and Asian leaders evacuated, some by helicopter, after hundreds of protesters stormed and entered the facility. The protest occurred on the last day of the ASEAN+3 meeting, hosted by Thailand's Ministry of Foreign Affairs, bringing it to an abrupt end, but not before delegates had successfully concluded several important meetings during the first two days of the gathering. Delegation leaders were escorted off the property and the protesters dispersed. No one was injured during the protest.

== Notable hotel guests ==
From H.M the King of Sweden to former U.S. President Jimmy Carter and actors Roger Moore, William Hurt, and Britt Ekland, numerous Royal Family members, Heads of States, Entertainers and Sports Stars have visited the Royal Cliff over the last 30 years.
