= Johnny Bedford =

American sport wrestler and martial artist

- Born: January 6, 1983 (age 43); Woodville, Ohio, U.S.
- Other names: Brutal
- Height: 5 ft 10 in (1.78 m)
- Weight: 135 lb (61 kg; 9 st 9 lb)
- Division: Featherweight; Bantamweight
- Reach: 71 in (180 cm)
- Stance: Orthodox
- Fighting out of: Fort Worth, Texas, United States; Colleyville, Texas, United States
- Team: Fitness Fight Factory; Team Takedown
- Rank: Black belt Brazilian Jiu-Jitsu
- Wrestling: NCAA Division I Wrestling
- Years active: 2003–2017 (MMA); 2018–2021 (bareknuckle)

Mixed martial arts record
- Total: 39
- Wins: 23
- By knockout: 10
- By submission: 9
- By decision: 4
- Losses: 14
- By knockout: 2
- By submission: 11
- By decision: 1
- Draws: 1
- No contests: 1

Other information
- Mixed martial arts record from Sherdog

Johnny Bedford (born January 6, 1983) is an American retired mixed martial artist and bare-knuckle boxer. A professional from 2003 to 2017, he fought in the UFC, Bellator, the Legacy Fighting Alliance, and was a competitor on Spike TV's The Ultimate Fighter: Team Bisping vs. Team Miller. He also fought for the Bare Knuckle Fighting Championship (BKFC), where he was a former BKFC Bantamweight Champion.

== Background ==
Bedford was born and raised in Woodville, Ohio. At the age of five, Bedford began wrestling year round. He and his family would travel all over the Midwest so Bedford could compete in various wrestling tournaments. He went on to wrestle for Woodmore High School, where his father was the head wrestling coach. Bedford was a three-time state qualifier, placed in the state tournament twice, and during his senior year finished third in the state tournament with a record of 51–1. After graduating from Woodmore he enrolled at Cleveland State University. At Cleveland State, Bedford was on the wrestling team for a year and a half before he was removed from the school (as well as the wrestling squad) before later making the transition to a career in mixed martial arts.

== Mixed martial arts career ==
=== Amateur career ===
Bedford began fighting in 2003 because he was a self-proclaimed "tough guy" that just wanted to prove how tough he was. Bedford proclaims his first six amateur fights took place in a barn where the promoter just asked the audience who wanted to fight and then would match them up by who was closest to one another's weight. With no commission in Ohio at the time, the fights were not sanctioned.

=== Early professional career ===
After a successful amateur career, Bedford took a year and half off from fighting before being offered his first professional fight in 2006 for $200. With no income, Bedford took the fight on short notice and lost via submission in the first round. Bedford began fighting more frequently and by the end of 2009 Bedford held a 13–8–1 record.

=== Bellator ===
Bedford was invited to fight for Bellator in 2010. The fight took place at Bellator 19 in Grand Prairie, Texas, on May 20, 2010. Bedford fought and defeated Jared Lopez via third-round TKO.

=== Post-Bellator ===
At King of Kombat 9: Resurrection, Bedford fought future UFC fighter, Edwin Figueroa. Bedford lost the fight via TKO in the opening of the second round, handing Bedford his only knockout loss in his career. Four months later he bounced back with a first round submission over WEC veteran Frank Gomez.

=== The Ultimate Fighter ===
In 2011, Bedford had signed with the UFC to compete on The Ultimate Fighter: Team Bisping vs. Team Miller in Las Vegas. In the first episode, Bedford fought Carson Beebe to gain entry into the Ultimate Fighter house. Bedford defeated Beebe in the first round via submission (neck crank). He was selected as a part of Team Mayhem.

Bedford then fought Josh Ferguson in the third episode and won by unanimous decision after using his superior size to take down and control Ferguson.

In the semi-finals Bedford pleaded for the fight against Team Mayhem teammate, John Dodson. The coaches and Dana White agreed with the fight, and matched the two up. After a closely contested first round, Bedford lost after being knocked unconscious one minute into round two. When asked if he knew where he was immediately after the fight, Bedford replied, "I'm in Ohio"; his home state.

=== Ultimate Fighting Championship ===
Though he did not win the show, Bedford signed an exclusive contract with the UFC. He officially made his UFC debut on December 3, 2011, at The Ultimate Fighter 14 Finale against Ultimate Fighter castmate Louis Gaudinot. Bedford dominated the entirety of the fight and won in the third round via TKO after hitting several knees to Gaudinot's body.

Bedford was expected to face Eddie Wineland on January 28, 2012, at UFC on Fox 2, replacing Demetrious Johnson who had been pulled from the bout to be a participant in the UFC's inaugural Flyweight tournament. However, Wineland himself was forced out of the bout with an injury and replaced by promotional newcomer Mitch Gagnon. On January 25, 2012, the UFC announced the bout was cancelled due to Gagnon's alleged visa issues. Bedford received his show-money of $8,000, despite the cancellation.

Bedford was expected to face Nick Denis at UFC on Fox 3 on May 5, 2012. However, Bedford was forced out of the bout with an injury and replaced by Roland Delorme.

After nearly a year off due to various injuries, Bedford returned on December 15, 2012, to face Marcos Vinicius at The Ultimate Fighter: Team Carwin vs. Team Nelson Finale. He won the fight via KO in the second round.

Bedford was expected to face Erik Pérez on April 27, 2013, at UFC 159. However, Perez pulled out of the bout just days before the event citing an injury and was replaced by Bryan Caraway. He lost the back-and-forth fight via submission in the third round.

Bedford was expected to face Hugo Viana on September 4, 2013, at UFC Fight Night 28. However, Bedford pulled out of the bout citing an injury and was replaced by Wilson Reis.

Bedford faced Rani Yahya on April 11, 2014, at UFC Fight Night 39. The bout ended in a No Contest as an accidental clash of heads rendered Yahya unable to protect himself, forcing a referee stoppage at 0:39 of round 1. Bedford argued vociferously that the accidental clash of heads should have been ruled a TKO victory in his favor.

A rematch with Yahya was expected to take place on June 28, 2014, at UFC Fight Night 44. However, Yahya was forced out of the bout and replaced by Cody Gibson. For the second time in a row, his fight ended under somewhat controversial circumstances as Bedford was dropped by punches from Gibson and the fight was stopped by the referee just as Bedford appeared to be regaining consciousness, resulting in a first-round TKO loss.

The rescheduled rematch with Rani Yahya eventually took place on September 13, 2014, at UFC Fight Night 51. Yahya won via submission in the second round, and Bedford was subsequently released from the promotion shortly after.

=== Grappling ===
On September 30, 2012, Johnny Bedford competed in a no gi super fight against Jimmy Flick (Flick Brother's MMA) at the American Grappling Federation's Dallas Fall Classic. Johnny won the match by points.

== Bare knuckle boxing ==
Bedford faced Nick Mamalis at the inaugural BKFC 1 event held on June 2, 2018. He won the fight via TKO in the second round.

He made his sophomore appearance in the sport against Matt Murphy at BKFC 3 on October 20, 2018. He won the fight via unanimous decision.

=== BKFC Lightweight Tournament and championship ===
Bedford entered the BKFC Lightweight tournament and faced Abdiel Velazquez at BKFC 5 on April 6, 2019. He won the fight via fourth-round knockout, advancing to the tournament finals.

In the tournament final on June 22, 2019 at BKFC 6, Bedford defeated Reggie Barnett Jr. via unanimous decision to win BKFC and Police Gazette lightweight titles, the former later being renamed the BKFC Bantamweight Championship.

Bedford next faced Charles Bennett at BKFC 9 on November 16, 2019, in a non-title bout. He won the fight via second-round technical knockout.

Bedford was expected to make his first title defense against Dat Nguyen at BKFC 14 on November 14, 2020. The fight however was canceled due to a Bedford injury. Bedford eventually lost his title belt to undefeated Dat Nguyen on February 5, 2021, in Lakeland, Florida.

Bedford faced Reggie Barnett Jr. in a rematch for the vacant BKFC Bantamweight Championship at BKFC 20 on August 20, 2021. He won the fight via unanimous decision.

=== Retirement ===
On December 21, 2022, Beford announced his retirement from bare-knuckle fighting and other combat sports. He had been previously booked to fight Jarod Grant in March 2022 but withdrew from the fight. Later, he was set to face Dat Nguyen in another title defense in January 2023. But the match was canceled after Bedford retired.

== Championships and accomplishments ==
=== Mixed martial arts ===
- Warrior Xtreme Cagefighting
  - WXC Bantamweight Championship (One time)
- Bare Knuckle Fighting Championship
  - BKFC Lightweight World Champion
  - Police Gazette Lightweight Bare Knuckle title

=== Folkstyle wrestling ===
- Ohio High School Athletic Association
  - OHSAA Division 3 112 lb 6th place out of Woodmore High School (2000)
  - OHSAA Division 2 119 lb 3rd place out of Woodmore High School (2001)

== Mixed martial arts record ==
Professional record breakdown
39 matches	23 wins	14 losses
By knockout	10	2
By submission	9	11
By decision	4	1
Draws	1	
No contests	1	

Res.	Record	Opponent	Method	Event	Date	Round	Time	Location	Notes
Loss	23–14–1 (1)	Jesse Arnett	Decision (majority)	Fight Night 5: Medicine Hat	September 9, 2017	5	5:00	Dallas, Texas, United States	Originally for the Z Promotions Bantamweight Championship; switched to a non-title bout when Bedford missed weight.
Loss	23–13–1 (1)	Jimmy Flick	Submission (guillotine choke)	Legacy Fighting Alliance 18	July 14, 2017	3	3:09	Dallas, Texas, United States	
Win	23–12–1 (1)	Eric Higaonna	TKO (punches)	WXC 68: Nemesis	April 28, 2017	1	1:28	Ypsilanti, Michigan, United States	Defended the WXC Bantamweight Championship.
Win	22–12–1 (1)	Mike Hernandez	Submission (rear-naked choke)	WXC 64: Redemption	August 13, 2016	1	2:45	Taylor, Michigan, United States	Defended the WXC Bantamweight Championship.
Win	21–12–1 (1)	Taylor Moore	Submission (kimura)	WXC 63: Implosion	April 23, 2016	4	2:15	Southgate, Michigan, United States	Defended the WXC Bantamweight Championship.
Win	20–12–1 (1)	Josh Robinson	TKO (punches)	WXC 59: Homeland Pride	August 8, 2015	5	3:17	Taylor, Michigan, United States	Won the WXC Bantamweight Championship.
Loss	19–12–1 (1)	Rani Yahya	Submission (kimura)	UFC Fight Night: Bigfoot vs. Arlovski	September 13, 2014	2	2:04	Brasília, Brazil	
Loss	19–11–1 (1)	Cody Gibson	TKO (punch)	UFC Fight Night: Swanson vs. Stephens	June 28, 2014	1	0:38	San Antonio, Texas, United States	
NC	19–10–1 (1)	Rani Yahya	No Contest (accidental headbutt)	UFC Fight Night: Nogueira vs. Nelson	April 11, 2014	1	0:39	Abu Dhabi, United Arab Emirates	No Contest due to accidental clash of heads.
Loss	19–10–1	Bryan Caraway	Submission (guillotine choke)	UFC 159	April 27, 2013	3	4:44	Newark, New Jersey, United States	
Win	19–9–1	Marcos Vinicius	KO (body kick and punches)	The Ultimate Fighter 16 Finale	December 15, 2012	2	1:00	Las Vegas, Nevada, United States	
Win	18–9–1	Louis Gaudinot	TKO (knees to the body)	The Ultimate Fighter 14 Finale	December 3, 2011	3	1:58	Las Vegas, Nevada, United States	
Win	17–9–1	Frank Gomez	Submission (rear-naked choke)	Jackson's MMA Series 3	December 18, 2010	1	1:34	Albuquerque, New Mexico, United States	
Loss	16–9–1	Edwin Figueroa	TKO (punches)	King of Kombat 9	August 20, 2010	2	0:17	Austin, Texas, United States	
Win	16–8–1	Jared Lopez	TKO (knees and punches)	Bellator 19	May 20, 2010	3	2:16	Grand Prairie, Texas, United States	
Win	15–8–1	Ryan Webb	Submission (kimura)	Supreme Warrior 10	April 3, 2010	3	2:14	Frisco, Texas, United States	
Win	14–8–1	Danny Tims	Decision (unanimous)	C3 Fights 19	February 13, 2010	3	3:00	Newkirk, Oklahoma, United States	
Win	13–8–1	Tim Snyder	Submission (rear-naked choke)	Supreme Warrior 9	November 28, 2009	1	0:55	Frisco, Texas, United States	
Win	12–8–1	Humberto DeLeon	Decision (unanimous)	Cage Kings 6	October 9, 2009	3	3:00	Bossier City, Louisiana, United States	
Loss	11–8–1	Mike Baskis	Submission (guillotine choke)	Supreme Warrior 8	September 18, 2009	3	2:22	Frisco, Texas, United States	
Win	11–7–1	Daniel Pineda	Submission (triangle choke)	Supreme Warrior 7	June 20, 2009	2	2:58	Frisco, Texas, United States	
Win	10–7–1	Francisco Barragan	Submission (D'Arce choke)	Urban Rumble 4	May 23, 2009	1	0:53	Pasadena, California, United States	
Win	9–7–1	Jeremy Dodd	TKO (punches)	Supreme Warrior 5	April 11, 2009	1	2:11	Frisco, Texas, United States	
Loss	8–7–1	Daniel Pineda	Submission (kneebar)	Supreme Warrior 3	February 21, 2009	1	2:00	Frisco, Texas, United States	
Loss	8–6–1	Dustin Neace	Submission (kneebar)	King of Kombat 5	November 22, 2008	1	1:38	Austin, Texas, United States	
Win	8–5–1	Shane Waits	Submission (armbar)	Elite Combat League 1	November 1, 2008	2	2:12	Bixby, Oklahoma, United States	
Win	7–5–1	Joshua Lee	Submission (rear-naked choke)	Supreme Warrior 1	September 19, 2008	1	1:38	Frisco, Texas, United States	
Win	6–5–1	Rocky Long	Decision (unanimous)	King of Kombat 4	July 26, 2008	3	5:00	Austin, Texas, United States	
Loss	5–5–1	Stephen Ledbetter	Submission (triangle choke)	Revolution Fight League 3	May 17, 2008	1	N/A	Macon, Georgia, United States	
Win	5–4–1	Damon Chamberlin	TKO (punches)	Toledo Fight Challenge	December 22, 2007	1	0:24	Toledo, Ohio, United States	
Win	4–4–1	Justin Moore	TKO (punches)	Knockout Promotions	July 21, 2007	2	3:22	Louisville, Kentucky, United States	
Win	3–4–1	Rocky Long	Decision (unanimous)	Adrenaline Fight Sports 1	June 30, 2007	3	5:00	Lufkin, Texas, United States	
Loss	2–4–1	Billy Vaughan	Submission (heel hook)	Explosion CFC 2	March 10, 2007	1	1:31	Tinley Park, Illinois, United States	
Loss	2–3–1	Arman Loktev	Submission (armbar)	Fightfest 11	February 3, 2007	1	0:28	Canton, Ohio, United States	
Win	2–2–1	Dan Caesar	Submission (guillotine choke)	Explosion CFC 1	December 16, 2006	1	0:20	Tinley Park, Illinois, United States	
Loss	1–2–1	Dustin Neace	Submission (armbar)	Genesis 5	November 25, 2006	2	0:56	Findlay, Ohio, United States	
Draw	1–1–1	Kris Kanaley	Draw	Ironheart Crown 11	November 18, 2006	2	5:00	Hammond, Indiana, United States	
Win	1–1	Roc Castricone	TKO (punches)	Fightfest 8	October 20, 2006	1	2:43	Cleveland, Ohio, United States	
Loss	0–1	Chino Duran	Submission (choke)	Xtreme Gladiators 3	September 23, 2006	1	N/A	Richmond, Virginia, United States	

=== Mixed martial arts exhibition record ===
Exhibition record breakdown		
3 matches	2 wins	1 loss
By knockout	0	1
By submission	1	0
By decision	1	0

Res.	Record	Opponent	Method	Event	Date	Round	Time	Location	Notes
Loss	2–1	John Dodson	KO (punches)	The Ultimate Fighter: Team Bisping vs. Team Miller	November 16, 2011 (airdate)	2	1:00	Las Vegas, Nevada, United States	Semi-finals.
Win	2–0	Josh Ferguson	Decision (unanimous)	The Ultimate Fighter: Team Bisping vs. Team Miller	November 2, 2011 (airdate)	2	5:00	Las Vegas, Nevada, United States	Quarter-finals.
Win	1–0	Carson Beebe	Submission (neck crank)	The Ultimate Fighter: Team Bisping vs. Team Miller	September 21, 2011 (airdate)	1	4:19	Las Vegas, Nevada, United States	Preliminary bout.

== Bare knuckle record ==
Professional record breakdown
7 matches	6 wins	1 loss
By knockout	3	0
By decision	3	1

Res.	Record	Opponent	Method	Event	Date	Round	Time	Location	Notes
Win	6–1	Reggie Barnett Jr.	Decision (unanimous)	BKFC 20	August 20, 2021	5	2:00	Biloxi, Mississippi, United States	Won the vacant BKFC Bantamweight Championship. Later vacated the title.
Loss	5–1	Dat Nguyen	Decision (unanimous)	BKFC Knucklemania	February 5, 2021	5	2:00	Miami, Florida, United States	Lost the BKFC Bantamweight Championship.
Win	5–0	Charles Bennett	TKO (hand injury)	BKFC 9	November 16, 2019	2	2:00	Biloxi, Mississippi, United States	Non-title bout.
Win	4–0	Reggie Barnett Jr.	Decision (unanimous)	BKFC 6	June 22, 2019	5	2:00	Tampa, Florida, United States	Won the inaugural BKFC Bantamweight Championship. Bantamweight Tournament Final
Win	3–0	Abdiel Velazquez	TKO (punches)	BKFC 5	April 6, 2019	4	0:58	Biloxi, Mississippi, United States	Bantamweight Tournament Semifinal
Win	2–0	Matt Murphy	Decision (unanimous)	BKFC 3	October 20, 2018	5	2:00	Biloxi, Mississippi, USA	
Win	1–0	Nick Mamalis	TKO (punches)	BKFC 1	June 2, 2018	2	1:41	Cheyenne, Wyoming, USA	
