= Luis Palomino =

Peruvian-American mixed martial arts fighter

- Born: October 9, 1980 (age 46); Lima, Peru
- Other names: Baboon
- Height: 5 ft 8 in (1.73 m)
- Weight: 155 lb (70 kg; 11.1 st)
- Division: Lightweight; Featherweight; Welterweight
- Reach: 70 in (178 cm)
- Fighting out of: Miami, Florida, United States
- Team: Young Tigers Foundation; MMA Masters; American Top Team (2013); 5th Street Gym (2019–present)
- Trainer: Dino Spencer; Eric Castaños
- Rank: Black belt in Brazilian Jiu-Jitsu; Professor in Capoeira under Mestre Cesar
- Years active: 2006–present

Mixed martial arts record
- Total: 45
- Wins: 27
- By knockout: 16
- By submission: 2
- By decision: 9
- Losses: 18
- By knockout: 5
- By submission: 3
- By decision: 10

Other information
- Boxing record from BoxRec
- Mixed martial arts record from Sherdog

Luis Palomino (born October 9, 1980) is a Peruvian-American mixed martial artist and bare-knuckle fighter. He is the Lightweight Champion and has been the inaugural King of Streets Champion in the Bare Knuckle Fighting Championship (BKFC). Palomino is also a former BKFC Welterweight Champion, making him the first simultaneous two-division champion. He is a professional competitor since 2006, and has formerly competed for the World Series of Fighting (WSOF), Bellator MMA and Absolute Championship Berkut.

As of April 13, 2026, he is #4 in the BKFC men's lightweight rankings.

== Mixed martial arts career ==
=== Early career ===
Palomino began his career with a 3–0 record in the Absolute Fighting Championship promotion, including a victory over his competitor Jeremy May via unanimous decision.

In his final fight prior to joining Bellator Fighting Championships, Palomino fought John Mahlow for the XFC Lightweight Championship, in a bout that was featured on the Inside MMA show. Palomino lost the fight via submission following a rear-naked choke in the fifth round.

=== Bellator Fighting Championships ===
Palomino then joined Bellator Fighting Championships to take part in their Bellator Season One: Featherweight Tournament. His opening round fight was against Estevan Payan at Bellator 1. Palomino lost the fight via split decision.

Despite his elimination from the featherweight tournament, Palomino stayed with the Bellator promotion and continued in the featherweight division. His opponent at Bellator 6 was Nick Gonzalez. Palomino defeated him via TKO in the second minute of the first round.

Palomino next faced Troy Gerhart at Bellator 12 in a 150lb bout and defeated him via unanimous decision.

After the first season of Bellator ended, Palomino took a few fights outside of the promotion. Palomino lost his first fight to the eventual Ultimate Fighter winner Jonathan Brookins via submission following a rear naked choke in the second round. Palomino later achieved two victories including wins over Rafael Dias by TKO and Jorge Masvidal via split decision.

In his next Bellator appearance at Bellator 21, Palomino defeated Jose Figueroa via unanimous decision in a lightweight bout.

Palomino then stayed with Bellator into the third season. His first fight of the season was against Yves Edwards at Bellator 24, which he lost via unanimous decision.

=== Championship Fighting Alliance ===
Palomino signed with local promotion Championship Fighting Alliance and made his CFA debut on May 6, 2011, in Miami, Florida against Peter Grimes for the inaugural CFA Featherweight championship at CFA's inaugural event: "CFA: The Title". Palomino defeated Grimes by submission due to an armbar at the 4:59 minute mark of the fourth round.

Palomino returned at "CFA 04: Izquierdo vs. Cenoble" on December 17, 2011, in Coral Gables, Florida against journeyman Charles Bennett. Palomino ultimately knocked Bennett out at 3:59 of the first round. Palomino became only the second man to knock Bennett out.

Palomino was scheduled to fight former Maximum Fighting Championship Lightweight Champion Antonio McKee at "CFA 06" on April 13, 2012, in Coral Gables, Florida. McKee was forced off the card due to an injury and was replaced by James Warfield. The fight was originally scheduled for the CFA Lightweight Championship. However, Warfield did not meet the required weight limit of 155 pounds. This caused the fight to be downgraded to a non-title fight. Warfield knocked Palomino down in the first round, but Palomino was able to recover and won by a unanimous decision.

Palomino next faced "2x Hero's" Grand Prix winner and Strikeforce veteran, Gesias Cavalcante at "CFA 07: Never Give Up" on June 30, 2012, in Coral Gables, Florida. Palomino became the first man to ever knock out Cavalcante, doing so in the third round.

At the CFA 09 on January 19, 2013, Palomino faced PRIDE veteran Luiz Firmino for the CFA Lightweight Championship. Palomino lost the fight with a unanimous decision.

At the CFA 11 on May 24, 2013, Palamino fought against Robert Washington and knocked him out in the first round.

Palomino faced The Ultimate Fighter 8 winner Efraín Escudero at CFA 12 on October 12, 2013. He lost the fight via unanimous decision.

=== World Series of Fighting ===
Palomino made his WSOF debut on January 18, 2014, in Hollywood, Florida against Jorge Patino, Palomino won via second-round knockout.

Palomino faced champion Justin Gaethje for the WSOF Lightweight Championship at WSOF 19 on March 28, 2015. He lost the back-and-forth fight via TKO in the third round.

Palomino faced Gaethje in a rematch on September 18, 2015, at WSOF 23. It was again a back-and-forth battle that Palomino lost via TKO in the second round.

Palomino next entered WSOF's one night Lightweight tournament to determine the number one contender for the Lightweight Championship. He faced Rich Patishnock in the quarter-finals and won via knockout in the first round. He then faced Brian Foster in the semifinals and lost via TKO in the second round.

=== Absolute Championship Berkut ===
Palomino faced Chechen fighter Musa Khamanaev on January 13, 2017, at ACB 51. He won the fight via TKO in the second round.

In the second fight he faced Marcos Vinicius Schmitz on May 20, 2017, at ACB 61. He won the fight via unanimous decision.

Palomino faced Yusuf Raisov on August 19, 2017, at ACB 67. He lost the fight via unanimous decision.

== Bare-knuckle boxing ==
After signing a three-fight contract with the BKFC, Palomino made his debut in bare-knuckle boxing against Elvin Brito at BKFC 10 on February 15, 2020. He won the fight via unanimous decision and advanced to the four-man BKFC Super Welterweight Tournament finals. This fight earned him the Fight of the Night award.

Palomino was initially scheduled to face Jim Alers at BKFC 11 on March 14, 2020, for the Lightweight Championship, but the event was postponed to take place on June 20, 2020, due to the COVID-19 pandemic. The event was subsequently postponed yet again and two weeks before the rescheduled date July 24, 2020, Alers withdrew after his camp member tested positive for COVID-19 and was replaced by Isaac Vallie-Flagg. Palomino claimed the title via first-minute knockout.

The bout with Alers was then rebooked to take place at BKFC 14 on November 13, 2020. Palomino successfully defended his title with a first-minute knockout.

In his second title defense attempt, Palomino faced Tyler Goodjohn at BKFC 18 on June 26, 2021. Palomino won the bout via unanimous decision and retained his title.

He next faced Dat Nguyen at BKFC 22 on November 12, 2021. He successfully defended the title via unanimous decision. This fight earned him another Fight of the Night award.

He successfully defended his title by defeating Martin Brown at BKFC KnuckleMania 2 on February 19, 2022, via unanimous decision.

Following his defeat of Brown, Palomino trie becoming the first two-division champion in the BKFC. He faced off against welterweight champion Elvin Brito at BKFC 26 on June 24, 2022. He won the welterweight championship by unanimous decision. In a January 2024 interview, Palomino said he was stripped of the welterweight belt.

Palomino faced James Lilley and defended his lightweight title on June 23, 2023, at BKFC 45: Hollywood and won by unanimous decision.

In a January 2024 interview, Palomino said he was no longer fighting in the lightweight division and would vacate the belt because "there was no money or big fights in the division."

On February 2, 2024, at BKFC 57 in Hollywood, Florida, Palomino fought Austin Trout for the vacant BKFC welterweight title and lost his first bare-knuckle boxing bout by unanimous decision.

Palomino defeated Howard Davis by unanimous decision at BKFC 70 on March 27, 2025, at Hard Rock Live in Hollywood, FL, to win the inaugural BKFC King of Streets Championship.

Palomino faced Austin Trout in a rematch on December 5, 2025 at BKFC 85 and lost via technical knockout at the end of the third round.

== Boxing ==
Palomino was scheduled to make his pro boxing debut against Gabriel Rosado on November 12, 2024, in Miami.

== Championships and accomplishments ==
=== Mixed martial arts ===
- Xtreme Fighting Championships
  - XFC Featherweight Championship (One time)
- Championship Fighting Alliance
  - Championship Fighting Alliance Featherweight Championship (One time; First)
  - 2012 Championship Fighting Alliance Most Valuable Fighter
  - Knockout of the Night (Two times) vs. Gesias Cavalcante on June 30, 2012, and vs. Charles Bennett on December 17, 2011
- MMA Junkie
  - 2015 #2 Ranked Fight of the Year vs. Justin Gaethje at WSOF 19
  - 2015 March Fight of the Month vs. Justin Gaethje
  - 2015 September Fight of the Month vs. Justin Gaethje
- Yahoo! Sports
  - 2015 Best Fight of the Half-Year vs. Justin Gaethje

=== Bare-knuckle boxing ===
- Bare Knuckle Fighting Championship
  - Police Gazette World Lightweight Championship
  - BKFC Lightweight Championship (One time; First)
    - Six successful title defenses
    - Most consecutive title defenses in BKFC history (6)
    - Most total title defenses in BKFC history (6)
  - BKFC Welterweight Championship (One time)
  - BKFC King of Streets Championship (One time; Current)
    - Most title fight wins in BKFC history (9)
    - First simultaneous multi-division champion in BKFC history (Lightweight, Welterweight)
    - Longest title reign in BKFC history (1288 days)
  - BKFC Fighter of the Year 2022
  - Fight of the Night (Three times) vs. Elvin Brito 2, Dat Nguyen and Howard Davis
  - Tied (Lorenzo Hunt) for the longest win streak in BKFC history (9)

== Brazilian Jiu-Jitsu ==
- Promoted to black belt on April 25, 2012, by Daniel Valverde

== Mixed martial arts record ==
Professional record breakdown
45 matches	27 wins	18 losses
By knockout	16	5
By submission	2	3
By decision	9	10

Res.	Record	Opponent	Method	Event	Date	Round	Time	Location	Notes
Loss	27–18	Brandon Girtz	Decision (unanimous)	Gamebred Bareknuckle MMA 12	October 2, 2026	3	5:00	Santo Domingo, Dominican Republic	Gamebred FC Lightweight Grand Prix Quarterfinal.
Win	27–17	Darrell Horcher	TKO (punches and elbows)	Gamebred Bareknuckle MMA 10	May 1, 2026	3	4:44	Miami, Florida, United States	Gamebred FC Lightweight Grand Prix Round of 16.
Loss	26–17	Claudio Quintana Nadal	Decision (unanimous)	Productora LFN: Live Fight Night	May 4, 2019	3	5:00	Santiago, Chile	Return to Lightweight.
Loss	26–16	Apti Bimarzaev	Decision (unanimous)	ACA 93	March 16, 2019	3	5:00	Saint Petersburg, Russia	
Loss	26–15	Lom-Ali Eskiev	Decision (unanimous)	ACB 84	April 7, 2018	3	5:00	Bratislava, Slovakia	
Loss	26–14	Yusuf Raisov	Decision (unanimous)	ACB 67	August 19, 2017	3	5:00	Grozny, Russia	
Win	26–13	Marcos Vinicius Schmitz	Decision (unanimous)	ACB 61	May 20, 2017	3	5:00	Saint Petersburg, Russia	
Win	25–13	Musa Khamanaev	TKO (punches)	ACB 51	January 13, 2017	2	3:35	Irvine, California, United States	Catchweight (150 lb) bout.
Loss	24–13	Sheymon Moraes	Decision (unanimous)	WSOF 31	June 17, 2016	3	5:00	Mashantucket, Connecticut, United States	Return to Featherweight.
Loss	24–12	Brian Foster	TKO (punches)	WSOF 25	November 20, 2015	2	4:19	Phoenix, Arizona, United States	WSOF Lightweight Tournament Semifinal.
Win	24–11	Rich Patishnock	KO (punch)	WSOF 25	November 20, 2015	1	4:55	Phoenix, Arizona, United States	WSOF Lightweight Tournament Quarterfinal.
Loss	23–11	Justin Gaethje	TKO (punches)	WSOF 23	September 18, 2015	2	4:30	Phoenix, Arizona, United States	For the WSOF Lightweight Championship.
Loss	23–10	Justin Gaethje	TKO (leg kicks and punches)	WSOF 19	March 28, 2015	3	3:57	Phoenix, Arizona, United States	For the WSOF Lightweight Championship.
Win	23–9	Lewis Gonzalez	KO (knee and punch)	WSOF 12	August 9, 2014	1	4:42	Las Vegas, Nevada, United States	
Win	22–9	Jorge Patino	KO (punches)	WSOF 8	January 18, 2014	2	4:20	Hollywood, Florida, United States	
Loss	21–9	Efraín Escudero	Decision (unanimous)	CFA 12	October 12, 2013	3	5:00	Coral Gables, Florida, United States	
Win	21–8	Robert Washington	KO (punch)	CFA 11	May 24, 2013	1	3:23	Coral Gables, Florida, United States	
Loss	20–8	Luiz Firmino	Decision (unanimous)	CFA 9	January 19, 2013	5	5:00	Coral Gables, Florida, United States	Lost the CFA Lightweight Championship.
Win	20–7	Gesias Cavalcante	KO (punches)	CFA 7	June 30, 2012	3	1:41	Coral Gables, Florida, United States	
Win	19–7	James Warfield	Decision (unanimous)	CFA 6	April 13, 2012	3	5:00	Coral Gables, Florida, United States	Won the inaugural CFA Lightweight Championship. Warfield missed weight (158.5 lb) and was ineligible for the title.
Win	18–7	Charles Bennett	KO (punch)	CFA 4	December 17, 2011	1	3:59	Coral Gables, Florida, United States	
Win	17–7	James Edson Berto	Decision (unanimous)	W-1 MMA 7	October 15, 2011	3	5:00	Miami, Florida, United States	Return to Lightweight.
Loss	16–7	Pat Curran	Submission (Peruvian necktie)	Bellator 46	June 25, 2011	1	3:49	Miami, Florida, United States	2011 Bellator Summer Series Featherweight Tournament Quarterfinal.
Win	16–6	Peter Grimes	Submission (armbar)	CFA 1	May 6, 2011	4	4:59	Miami, Florida, United States	Won the inaugural CFA Featherweight Championship.
Win	15–6	Daron Cruickshank	KO (head kick and punches)	G-Force Fights: Bad Blood 5	February 26, 2011	1	3:52	Grand Rapids, Michigan, United States	
Win	14–6	Jarrod Card	Decision (unanimous)	XFC 13	December 3, 2010	5	5:00	Tampa, Florida, United States	Return to Featherweight. Won the XFC Featherweight Championship.
Loss	13–6	Yves Edwards	Decision (unanimous)	Bellator 24	August 12, 2010	3	5:00	Hollywood, Florida, United States	
Win	13–5	Jose Figueroa	Decision (unanimous)	Bellator 21	June 10, 2010	3	5:00	Hollywood, Florida, United States	
Win	12–5	Jorge Masvidal	Decision (split)	G-Force Fights: Bad Blood 3	February 4, 2010	3	5:00	Miami, Florida, United States	Return to Lightweight.
Win	11–5	Rafael Dias	TKO (punches)	Unconquered 1	November 20, 2009	3	4:47	Coral Gables, Florida, United States	
Loss	10–5	Jonathan Brookins	Submission (rear-naked choke)	G-Force Fights: Bad Blood 2	September 26, 2009	2	1:44	Coral Gables, Florida, United States	
Win	10–4	Troy Gerhart	Decision (unanimous)	Bellator 12	June 19, 2009	3	5:00	Hollywood, Florida, United States	Catchweight (151.5 lb) bout; Gerhart missed weight.
Win	9–4	Nick Gonzalez	TKO (punches)	Bellator 6	May 8, 2009	1	2:13	Robstown, Texas, United States	Catchweight (146.5 lb) bout; Palomino missed weight.
Loss	8–4	Estevan Payan	Decision (split)	Bellator 1	April 3, 2009	3	5:00	Hollywood, Florida, United States	Featherweight debut. Bellator Season 1 Featherweight Tournament Quarterfinal.
Loss	8–3	John Mahlow	Submission (rear-naked choke)	XFC 6	December 5, 2008	5	1:57	Tampa, Florida, United States	For the XFC Lightweight Championship.
Win	8–2	Marc Stevens	Decision (unanimous)	United States Fight League: War in the Woods 5	November 29, 2008	3	5:00	Ledyard, Connecticut, United States	Won the vacant USFL Lightweight Championship.
Win	7–2	Eric Reynolds	KO (punch)	G-Force Fights: Bad Blood 1	November 6, 2008	1	0:38	Miami, Florida, United States	Return to Lightweight.
Win	6–2	Andrew Carron	TKO (punches)	United States Fight League: War in the Woods 4	September 13, 2008	1	0:57	Ledyard, Connecticut, United States	
Loss	5–2	Mike Bernhard	TKO (punches)	Premier X-treme Fighting	December 8, 2007	2	4:01	Hollywood, Florida, United States	
Win	5–1	Patrick Mikesz	KO (punches)	Rage in Cage: Cage FC	October 6, 2007	1	1:10	Fort Lauderdale, Florida, United States	
Win	4–1	Steve Conley	TKO (punches)	Panther Fight League: Genesis	March 31, 2007	1	2:33	Miami, Florida, United States	
Loss	3–1	Travis Cox	TKO (punches)	World Extreme Fighting	November 18, 2006	1	1:08	Miami, Florida, United States	
Win	3–0	Jeremy May	Decision (unanimous)	Absolute FC 19	October 21, 2006	2	5:00	Boca Raton, Florida, United States	Welterweight debut.
Win	2–0	Mike Soltz	TKO (punches)	Absolute FC 18	August 26, 2006	1	0:25	Boca Raton, Florida, United States	
Win	1–0	Louis Pilato	Submission (punches)	Absolute FC 17	June 24, 2006	1	1:23	Boca Raton, Florida, United States	Lightweight debut.

== Bare knuckle record ==
Professional record breakdown
12 matches	10 wins	2 losses
By knockout	3	1
By decision	7	1

Res.	Record	Opponent	Method	Event	Date	Round	Time	Location	Notes
Loss	10–2	Austin Trout	TKO (doctor stoppage)	BKFC 85	December 5, 2025	3	2:00	Hollywood, Florida, United States	
Win	10–1	Howard Davis	Decision (unanimous)	BKFC 70	March 27, 2025	5	2:00	Hollywood, Florida, United States	For the inaugural BKFC King of Streets Championship.
Loss	9–1	Austin Trout	Decision (unanimous)	BKFC 57	February 2, 2024	5	2:00	Hollywood, Florida, United States	For the vacant BKFC Welterweight Championship.
Win	9–0	James Lilley	Decision (unanimous)	BKFC 45	June 23, 2023	5	2:00	Hollywood, Florida, United States	Defended the BKFC Lightweight Championship.
Win	8–0	Tom Shoaff	TKO (doctor stoppage)	BKFC 34	December 3, 2022	4	0:01	Hollywood, Florida, United States	Defended the BKFC Lightweight Championship.
Win	7–0	Elvin Brito	Decision (unanimous)	BKFC 26	June 24, 2022	5	2:00	Hollywood, Florida, United States	Won the BKFC Welterweight Championship. Fight of the Night.
Win	6–0	Martin Brown	Decision (unanimous)	BKFC KnuckleMania 2	February 19, 2022	5	2:00	Miami, Florida, United States	Defended the BKFC Lightweight Championship.
Win	5–0	Dat Nguyen	Decision (unanimous)	BKFC 22	November 12, 2021	5	2:00	Miami, Florida, United States	Defended the BKFC Lightweight Championship. Fight of the Night.
Win	4–0	Tyler Goodjohn	Decision (unanimous)	BKFC 18	June 26, 2021	5	2:00	Miami, Florida, United States	Defended the BKFC Lightweight Championship.
Win	3–0	Jim Alers	TKO (punches)	BKFC 14	November 13, 2020	1	0:44	Miami, Florida, United States	Defended the BKFC Lightweight Championship.
Win	2–0	Isaac Vallie-Flagg	KO (punches)	BKFC 11	July 24, 2020	1	0:45	Oxford, Mississippi, United States	Super Welterweight Tournament Final. Won the BKFC Super Welterweight Championship. Later renamed Lightweight Championship.
Win	1–0	Elvin Brito	Decision (unanimous)	BKFC 10	February 15, 2020	5	2:00	Fort Lauderdale, Florida, United States	Super Welterweight Tournament Semi-Finals.

== See also ==
- List of male mixed martial artists
