= Reggie Barnett Jr. =

American bare-knuckle boxer, boxer and mixed martial artist (born 1986)

- Born: July 4, 1986 (age 40); Chesapeake, Virginia
- Other names: Educated Hands
- Nationality: American
- Height: 5 ft 5 in (1.65 m)
- Weight: 134 lb (61 kg; 9.6 st)
- Division: Flyweight; Bantamweight; Lightweight (MMA); Super featherweight (boxing); Bantamweight (Bare-knuckle boxing)
- Fighting out of: Virginia Beach, Virginia
- Years active: 2018–present (bare-knuckle boxing); 2015–2017 (MMA); 2015–2019 (boxing)

Professional boxing record
- Total: 8
- Wins: 6
- By knockout: 2
- Losses: 2

Mixed martial arts record
- Total: 7
- Wins: 3
- By knockout: 1
- By submission: 1
- By decision: 1
- Losses: 4
- By submission: 1
- By decision: 3

Bare-knuckle boxing record
- Total: 12
- Wins: 9
- By knockout: 3
- Losses: 3
- By knockout: 1

Other information
- Mixed martial arts record from Sherdog

Reginald Barnett Jr. (born July 4, 1986) is an American bare-knuckle boxer, boxer and mixed martial artist. He currently competes in the Bare Knuckle Fighting Championship, where he is a former BKFC Bantamweight Champion. As a mixed martial artist, he has competed in the Flyweight, Bantamweight and Lightweight division.

== Mixed martial arts career ==
Barnett started his professional MMA career in 2015 and competed until 2017. Throughout his career, he compiled a 3-4 professional record.

== Professional boxing career ==
Barnett boxed professionally between 2015 and 2019. Throughout his career, he amassed a record of 6-2.

== Bare-knuckle boxing career ==
In his BKFC debut, Barnett faced Travis Thompson at the inaugural Bare Knuckle FC BKFC 1 event held on June 2, 2018. He won the bout via unanimous decision.

Barnett faced James Clayton Burns at BKFC 2 on August 25, 2018. He won the bout via unanimous decision.

Barnett entered the BKFC Lightweight tournament and faced Rusty Crowder at BKFC 5 on April 6, 2019. He won the bout via unanimous decision.

Heading into the tournament final, Barnett faced Johnny Bedford on June 22, 2019, at BKFC 6. He lost the bout by unanimous decision.

Barnett faced Matt Murphy on February 15, 2020, at BKFC 10. He won the bout by second-round technical knockout via punches.

Barnett faced Abdiel Velazquez on September 11, 2020, at BKFC 12. He won the bout via unanimous decision.

Barnett faced DeMarcus Corley on March 19, 2021, at BKFC 16. He won the fight via retirement after the fourth round.

Barnett faced Johnny Bedford in a rematch for the vacant BKFC Bantamweight Championship at BKFC 20 on August 20, 2021. He lost the bout via unanimous decision.

=== Bantamweight champion ===
Barnett faced Jarod Grant for the BKFC interim bantamweight title on July 23, 2022, at BKFC Fight Night 10. He won the bout by technical decision to win the interim title.

On December 21, 2022, Bedford announced his retirement from bare-knuckle fighting and other combat sports. Barnett would be promoted to undisputed champion the following month.

In his first title defense, Barnett faced Daniel Alvarez at BKFC 39 on March 24, 2023. He won the bout by doctor stoppage in the third round.

Barnett faced Keith Richardson for the BKFC Bantamweight Championship at BKFC 52 on October 20, 2023. He lost the fight via second-round technical knockout.

== Championships and accomplishments ==
- Bare Knuckle Fighting Championship
  - BKFC Bantamweight World Championship (One time)
    - One successful title defense
  - Interim BKFC Bantamweight World Championship (One time)
    - One successful title defense

== Mixed martial arts record ==
Professional record breakdown
7 matches	3 wins	4 losses
By knockout	1	0
By submission	1	1
By decision	1	3

== Bare knuckle record ==
Professional record breakdown
12 matches	9 wins	3 losses
By knockout	3	1
By decision	6	2

Res.	Record	Opponent	Method	Event	Date	Round	Time	Location	Notes
Loss	9–3	Keith Richardson	TKO (punches)	BKFC 52	October 20, 2023	2	0:58	Columbia, South Carolina, United States	Lost the BKFC Bantamweight Championship.
Win	9–2	Daniel Alvarez	TKO (doctor stoppage)	BKFC 39	March 24, 2023	3	2:00	Norfolk, Virginia, United States	Defended the BKFC Bantamweight Championship.
Win	8–2	Geane Herrera	Decision (unanimous)	BKFC 32	November 5, 2022	5	2:00	Orlando, Florida, United States	Defended the interim BKFC Bantamweight Championship. Later promoted to undisputed champion.
Win	7–2	Jarod Grant	Technical Decision (accidental eye poke)	BKFC Fight Night Tampa 2: Grant vs. Barnett	July 23, 2022	4	2:00	Tampa, Florida, United States	For the interim BKFC Bantamweight Championship.
Loss	6–2	Johnny Bedford	Decision (unanimous)	BKFC 20	August 20, 2021	5	2:00	Biloxi, Mississippi, United States	
Win	6–1	DeMarcus Corley	TKO (retirement)	BKFC 16	March 19, 2021	4	2:00	Biloxi, Mississippi, United States	
Win	5–1	Abdiel Velazquez	Decision (unanimous)	BKFC 12	September 11, 2020	5	2:00	Daytona Beach, Florida, United States	
Win	4–1	Matt Murphy	TKO (punches)	BKFC 10	February 15, 2020	2	1:46	Fort Lauderdale, Florida, United States	
Loss	3–1	Johnny Bedford	Decision (unanimous)	BKFC 6	June 22, 2019	5	2:00	Tampa, Florida, United States	
Win	3–0	Rusty Crowder	Decision (unanimous)	BKFC 5	April 6, 2019	5	2:00	Biloxi, Mississippi, United States	
Win	2–0	James Clayton Burns	Decision (unanimous)	BKFC 2	August 25, 2018	5	2:00	Biloxi, Mississippi, United States	
Win	1–0	Travis Thompson	Decision (unanimous)	BKFC 1	June 2, 2018	5	2:00	Cheyenne, Wyoming, United States	
