= Jarod Grant =

American bare-knuckle boxer and mixed martial artist (born 1998)

- Born: Jarod Michael Grant Schiavello; April 1998 (age 28); Miami, Florida, United States
- Other names: Kid Gatti
- Height: 5 ft 6 in (1.68 m)
- Weight: 136 lb (62 kg; 9.7 st)
- Division: Featherweight (MMA); Bantamweight (Bare-knuckle boxing)
- Fighting out of: Pembroke Pines, Florida
- Years active: 2020–present (bare-knuckle boxing); 2023 (MMA)

Mixed martial arts record
- Total: 1
- Wins: 0
- Losses: 1
- By submission: 1

Bare-knuckle boxing record
- Total: 8
- Wins: 6
- By knockout: 5
- Losses: 2
- By knockout: 1

Other information
- Mixed martial arts record from Sherdog

Jarod Grant (born April 1998) is an American bare-knuckle boxer and mixed martial artist. He currently competes in BYB Extreme Fighting Series.

He previously competed in Bare Knuckle Fighting Championship (BKFC), where he is a former interim BKFC Bantamweight Champion. As a mixed martial artist, he has competed in the featherweight division.

== Mixed martial arts career ==
Grant made his professional MMA career against Ryan Kuse on May 5, 2023, at Gamebred Fighting Championship's event, entitled GFC 4. He lost the bout by submission in the first round.

== Bare-knuckle boxing career ==
In his BKFC debut, Grant faced Joshua Bourdreaux on September 11, 2020, at BKFC 12. He won the fight by second-round technical knockout.

Grant then faced Christopher Johnson at BKFC 14 on November 13, 2020. He won the bout via third-round technical knockout.

Grant faced Brandon Lambert on February 5, 2021, at BKFC Knucklemania. He won the bout by knockout in the third round.

Grant faced Travis Thompson at BKFC 18 on June 26, 2021. He won the bout by fourth-round technical knockout.

=== Interim Bantamweight champion ===
Grant faced Anthony Retic for the interim BKFC Bantamweight Championship at BKFC Fight Night 6 on March 12, 2022. He won the bout by unanimous decision to win the interim championship.

Grant faced Reggie Barnett Jr. on July 23, 2022, at BKFC Fight Night 10. He lost the bout by technical decision.

=== Move to flyweight ===
Moving to flyweight, Grant fought John Dodson on February 17, 2023, at BKFC KnuckleMania 3. He lost the bout via first-round knockout.

=== Signing with BYB ===
Grant signed a multi-fight deal with BYB in April 2024 and made his debut with the company at BYB 29, defeating Lukas Jones by 2nd round TKO.

== Championships and accomplishments ==
- Bare Knuckle Fighting Championship
  - Interim BKFC Bantamweight World Championship (One time)

== Mixed martial arts record ==
Professional record breakdown
1 match	0 wins	1 loss
By submission	0	1

Res.	Record	Opponent	Method	Event	Date	Round	Time	Location	Notes
Loss	0–1	Ryan Kuse	Submission (kimura)	Gamebred Bareknuckle MMA 4	May 5, 2023	1	2:28	Sunrise, Florida, United States	

== Bare knuckle record ==
Professional record breakdown
8 matches	6 wins	2 losses
By knockout	5	1
By decision	1	1

Res.	Record	Opponent	Method	Event	Date	Round	Time	Location	Notes
Win	6–2	Lukas Jones	TKO	BYB 29: Brawl in the Pines III	August 10, 2024	2	2:59	Pembroke Pines, Florida, United States	BYB Debut
Loss	5–2	John Dodson	KO (punches)	BKFC KnuckleMania 3	February 17, 2023	1	1:41	Albuquerque, New Mexico, United States	Flyweight debut.
Loss	5–1	Reggie Barnett Jr.	Decision (technical)	BKFC Fight Night Tampa 2: Grant vs. Barnett	July 23, 2022	4	2:00	Tampa, Florida, United States	Lost the Interim BKFC Bantamweight World Championship.
Win	5–0	Anthony Retic	Decision (unanimous)	BKFC Fight Night New York 2: Grant vs. Retic	March 12, 2022	5	2:00	Salamanca, New York, United States	Won the Interim BKFC Bantamweight World Championship.
Win	4–0	Travis Thompson	Decision (unanimous)	BKFC 18	June 26, 2021	4	0:35	Miami, Florida, United States	
Win	3–0	Brandon Lambert	Decision (punch)	BKFC Knucklemania	February 5, 2021	3	1:11	Lakeland, Florida, United States	Bantamweight debut.
Win	2–0	Christopher Johnson	TKO (corner stoppage)	BKFC 14	November 13, 2020	3	0:24	Miami, Florida, United States	
Win	1–0	Joshua Bourdreaux	TKO (referee stoppage)	BKFC 12	September 11, 2020	2	1:23	Daytona Beach, Florida, United States	Lightweight debut.
