= Francesco Ricchi =

Italian-American bare-knuckle boxer and mixed martial artist

- Born: February 24, 1994 (age 32); Naples, Italy
- Nationality: Italian; American
- Height: 6 ft 3 in (1.91 m)
- Weight: 171 lb (78 kg; 12.2 st)
- Division: Middleweight; Light heavyweight; Welterweight
- Fighting out of: Fort Lauderdale, Florida, United States
- Team: Freedom Fighters
- Years active: 2020–present (bare-knuckle boxing); 2019 (MMA)

Mixed martial arts record
- Total: 1
- Wins: 1
- By submission: 1
- Losses: 0

Bare-knuckle boxing record
- Total: 10
- Wins: 7
- By knockout: 5
- Losses: 3
- By knockout: 3

Other information
- Mixed martial arts record from Sherdog

Francesco Ricchi (born February 24, 1994) is an Italian-American bare-knuckle boxer and mixed martial artist. He currently competes in the Bare Knuckle Fighting Championship, where he is a former interim BKFC Middleweight Champion. As a mixed martial artist, he has competed in the welterweight division.

== Background ==
Ricchi was born in Naples, Italy on February 24, 1994. He emigrated with his family to the United States at the age of seven.

== Mixed martial arts career ==
Ricchi made his professional MMA career on December 7, 2019, against Christopher Lavant, at Combat Night Pro 16: South Florida. He won the bout by rear-naked choke in the first round.

== Bare-knuckle boxing career ==
In his BKFC debut, Ricchi faced Fred Pierce on February 15, 2020, at BKFC 10. He won his first bout by first-round technical knockout via punches.

Ricchi faced Noah Cutter at BKFC 14 on November 13, 2020. He won the bout via third-round technical knockout. After the bout, he was placed in a medically induced coma.

Ricchi faced Brian Maxwell at BKFC 18 on June 26, 2021. He won the bout by second-round technical knockout.

Ricchi faced Jake Bostwick at BKFC Knucklemania 2 on February 19, 2022. He won the bout by unanimous decision.

Ricchi faced Ulysses Diaz for the interim middleweight title on June 24, 2022, at BKFC 26. He won the bout by first-round TKO to win the interim title.

Ricchi faced David Mundell for the vacant BKFC middleweight title on December 3, 2022, at BKFC 34. He lost the bout by knockout in the third round.

Ricchi faced Erick Lozano at BKFC 38 on April 21, 2023. He lost the bout by first-round knockout.

Ricchi faced Anthony Lacaze on December 21, 2024 at BKFC on DAZN 3. He won the fight by unanimous decision.

Ricchi faced Dallas Davison on July 12, 2025 at BKFC 78. He won the fight by knockout in the second round.

Ricchi faced Josef Hala for the inaugural BKFC European Midleweight Championship on October 25, 2025 at BKFC 83. He lost the fight by technical knockout in the third round.

== Championships and accomplishments ==
- Bare Knuckle Fighting Championship
  - Interim BKFC Middleweight World Champion (One time)

== Mixed martial arts record ==
Professional record breakdown
1 match	1 win	0 losses
By submission	1	0

Res.	Record	Opponent	Method	Event	Date	Round	Time	Location	Notes
Win	1–0	Christopher Lavant	Submission (rear-naked choke)	Combat Night Pro 16	December 7, 2019	1	1:32	Coconut Creek, Florida, United States	

== Bare knuckle record ==
Professional record breakdown
10 matches	7 wins	3 losses
By knockout	5	3
By decision	2	0

Res.	Record	Opponent	Method	Event	Date	Round	Time	Location	Notes
Loss	7–3	Josef Hala	TKO	BKFC 83	October 25, 2025	3	1:43	Rome, Italy	For the inaugural BKFC European Middleweight Championship.
Win	7–2	Dallas Davison	KO	BKFC 78	July 12, 2025	2	1:27	Hollywood, Florida, United States	
Win	6–2	Anthony Lacaze	Decision (unanimous)	BKFC on DAZN Hollywood, FL: Warren vs. Richman	December 21, 2024	5	2:00	Hollywood, Florida, United States	
Loss	5–2	Erick Lozano	KO	BKFC 38	April 21, 2023	1	0:54	Delray Beach, Florida, United States	
Loss	5–1	David Mundell	KO (punch)	BKFC 34	December 3, 2022	3	1:48	Hollywood, Florida, United States	For the vacant the BKFC Middleweight Championship.
Win	5–0	Ulysses Diaz	TKO (doctor stoppage)	BKFC 26	June 24, 2022	1	1:16	Hollywood, Florida, United States	Won the interim BKFC Middleweight Championship.
Win	4–0	Jake Bostwick	Decision (unanimous)	BKFC KnuckleMania 2	February 19, 2022	5	2:00	Hollywood, Florida, United States	
Win	3–0	Brian Maxwell	TKO (punches)	BKFC 18	June 26, 2021	2	1:25	Miami, Florida, United States	
Win	2–0	Noah Cutter	TKO (punches)	BKFC 14	November 13, 2020	3	0:31	Miami, Florida, United States	
Win	1–0	Fred Pierce	TKO (punches)	BKFC 10	February 15, 2020	1	1:38	Fort Lauderdale, Florida, United States	
