= Dat Nguyen (boxer) =

American boxer (born 1982)

Personal information
- Nickname: Dat Be Dat
- Nationality: American
- Born: 10 October 1982 (age 43) Bien Hoa, Vietnam
- Height: 5 ft 6 in (168 cm)
- Weight: Featherweight; Super featherweight

Boxing career
- Reach: 167 cm (66 in)
- Stance: Orthodox

Boxing record
- Total fights: 23
- Wins: 20
- Win by KO: 7
- Losses: 3

Dat Nguyen (born October 10, 1982) is a Vietnamese-born American boxer and bare-knuckle boxer. He recently competed in the Bare Knuckle Fighting Championship and was the BKFC Bantamweight Champion.

== Early life ==
When Dat was eight years old, his mother decided to leave Vietnam to give her family a better life. She brought Dat and his five siblings to Hawaii where he grew up on the island of Maui. In eighth grade, Dat won his first Junior Olympic Championship and went on to win the Men's State Championship and Hawaii Golden Gloves. In 2001, Dat graduated with Honors and was awarded a full scholarship to Northern Michigan University, site of one of the three United States Olympic Training Centers. He spent three years studying Computer Information Systems while representing the USOEC in National and International competitions as an Olympic Hopeful.

== Boxing career ==
During his time at the U.S. Olympic Training Center, Dat was the first Vietnamese-American to win a silver medal at the National Golden Gloves and a bronze medal at the 2003 U.S. Championships that earned him spot at the U.S Men's Challenge to qualify for the first Olympic spot. In the U.S Challenge, Dat fought Mickey Bey (the eventual 2004 Olympian) but lost to him on a tie breaker.

Following his departure from the U.S Olympic Education Training Center, Dat decided to turn professional and made his debut on May 1, 2004 in Atlantic City, New Jersey. Dat won his first professional fight by knocking out Ernest Scott in the first round.

== Bare-knuckle boxing ==
In 2019, Nguyen signed with the Bare Knuckle Fighting Championship.

On October 19, 2019, he made his bare-knuckle debut against Travis Thompson at BKFC 8. Nguyen won by unanimous decision.

On February 15, 2020, Nguyen defeated Abdiel Velazquez by first-round knockout at BKFC 10.

Dat Nguyen was scheduled to face Johnny Bedford for the BKFC Lightweight Championship at BKFC KnuckleMania on February 5, 2021. After a hard-fought five-round war, Nguyen came out on top by judges decision to become the new BKFC Lightweight Champion. He subsequently called out Jonny Beltran for his next bout.

On June 10, 2021, BKFC president Dave Feldman revealed that the organization and Nguyen were unable to come to terms regarding a new contract, leading to the title being stripped and making Nguyen a free agent.

Nguyen ended up fighting for BKFC again and faced Luis Palomino at BKFC 22 on November 12, 2021 for the lightweight title and lost via unanimous decision. This fight earned him the Fight of the Night award.

Nguyen then faced two-time Bellator Featherweight World Champion Daniel Straus at BKFC 38 in the main event and won by unanimous decision in the sixth round after the first five rounds were ruled a draw.

== Fighting style ==
Nguyen is a boxer puncher with hand speed and power, who likes to beat up the body. He is promoted by King's Promotions, the leading promoter for Premier Boxing Champions (PBC). "Dat brings a ton of charisma coupled with great skill into the ring and I am happy to showcase his talents," said DiBella.

"Boxing is not my mother's first choice for me" said Nguyen. "But she encourages me to give 100% to anything I do. This is the thing I choose to do, "said Nguyen

Nguyen is trained by known teacher and former legendary fighter James "Buddy" McGirt in Vero Beach, Florida where Nguyen now lives. "He will be a champion" said McGirt.

== Championships and accomplishments ==
- Bare Knuckle Fighting Championship (BKFC)
  - BKFC Bantamweight Championship (one time)
  - Fight of the Night (One time) vs. Luis Palomino

== Professional boxing record ==
23 fights	20 wins	3 losses
By knockout	7	0
By decision	13	3

Res.	Record	Opponent	Type	Rd., Time	Date	Location	Notes
Win	20–3	(Mexico) Miguel Flores	TKO	(6/10)	2017-02-21	(United States) Silver Street Studios, Houston, Texas	
Win	19–3	(Mexico) Jesus Lule	UD	(6/6)	2016-06-03	(United States) Seminole Hard Rock Hotel and Casino Hollywood, Florida	
Win	18–3	(Mexico) Gustavo Molina	UD	(6/6)	2016-05-08	(United States) RP Funding Center, Lakeland, Florida	
Loss	17–3	(Puerto Rico) Jayson Vélez*	SD	(10/10)	Oct 5, 2013	(United States) Amway Center, Orlando, Florida	
Loss	17–2	(Puerto Rico) Luis Del Valle	UD	(10/10)	2011-06-11	(United States) Roseland Ballroom, New York City, New York	WBA-NABA Featherweight Title
Win	17–1	(Colombia) Andres Ledesma	UD	(8/8)	2009-10-10	(United States) Arena Theatre, Houston, Texas	
Win	16–1	(Mexico) Noe Lopez Jr	UD	(6/6)	2009-08-22	(United States) Pala Casino Resort and Spa, Pala, California	
Win	15–1	(Mexico) Carlos Francis Hernandez	UD	(8/8)	2009-05-28	(United States) Arena Theatre, Houston, Texas	
Win	14–1	(Puerto Rico) Carlos Diaz	UD	(8/8)	2008-11-11	(United States) Seminole Hard Rock Hotel and Casino Hollywood, Florida	
Win	13–1	(Puerto Rico) Juan G Cruz	MD	(6/6)	2008-08-06	(United States) B.B. King Blues Club & Grill, New York, New York	
Win	12–1	(United States) Robert DaLuz	MD	(8/8)	2008-04-12	(United States) The Roxy, Boston, MA	
Loss	11–1	(Mexico) Gregorio Torres	SD	(6/6)	2007-08-31	(United States) Casino Del Sol Tucson, Arizona	
Win	11–0	(Guatemala) Castulo Gonzalez	UD	(8/8)	2007-07-18	(United States) The Castle Boston, MA	
Win	10–0	(United States) Yamin Mohammad	TKO	(6/8) 2:21	2007-06-16	(United States) Mohegan Sun Casino, Uncasville, CT	
Win	9–0	(Cuba) Jorge Ruiz	UD	(6/6)	2007-05-04	(United States) Mohegan Sun Casino, Uncasville, CT	
Win	8–0	(United Kingdom) Vineash Rungea	UD	(6/6)	2007-02-23	(United States) Mohegan Sun Casino, Uncasville, CT	
Win	7–0	(United States) Jeremy Drapal	KO	(1/6) 0:37	2006-12-16	(United States) Miccosukee Indian Gaming Resort, Miami, Florida	
Win	6–0	(United States) Charles E Jones	TKO	(2/6) 2:26	2006-11-24	(United States) The Roxy, Boston, MA	
Win	5–0	(United States) Edwin Rosado	RTD	(3/4) 3:00	2006-10-28	(United States) Mohegan Sun Casino, Uncasville, CT	
Win	4–0	(United States) Rasool Shakoor	TKO	(4/4) 1:46	2006-08-11	(United States) The Roxy, Boston, MA	
Win	3–0	(United States) James Hope	UD	(4/4)	2005-03-04	(United States) Riveredge Hotel, Reading, PA	
Win	2–0	(Mexico) Othoniel Espinosa	UD	(4/4)	2004-07-24	(United States) Boardwalk Hall, Atlantic City, NJ	
Win	1–0	(United States) Ernest Scott	TKO	(1/4) 1:26	2004-05-01	(United States) Bally's Park Place Hotel Casino, Atlantic City, NJ	

== Bare knuckle record ==
Professional record breakdown
5 matches	4 wins	1 loss
By knockout	1	0
By decision	3	1

Res.	Record	Opponent	Method	Event	Date	Round	Time	Location	Notes
Win	4–1	Daniel Straus	Decision (unanimous)	BKFC 38	April 21, 2023	6	2:00	Delray Beach, Florida, United States	Fight went to a sixth round after the first five rounds were ruled a draw.
Loss	3–1	Luis Palomino	Decision (unanimous)	BKFC 22	November 12, 2021	5	2:00	Miami, Florida, United States	For the BKFC Super Welterweight Championship. Fight of the Night.
Win	3–0	Johnny Bedford	Decision (unanimous)	BKFC Knucklemania	February 5, 2021	5	2:00	Lakeland, Florida, United States	Won the BKFC Bantamweight Championship and the Police Gazette World Bantamweight Championship
Win	2–0	Abdiel Velazquez	KO (punches)	BKFC 12	February 15, 2020	1	1:51	Fort Lauderdale, Florida, United States	
Win	1–0	Travis Thompson	Decision (unanimous)	BKFC 8	October 19, 2019	5	2:00	Tampa, Florida, United States	
