= Jeremiah Riggs =

American mixed martial arts fighter

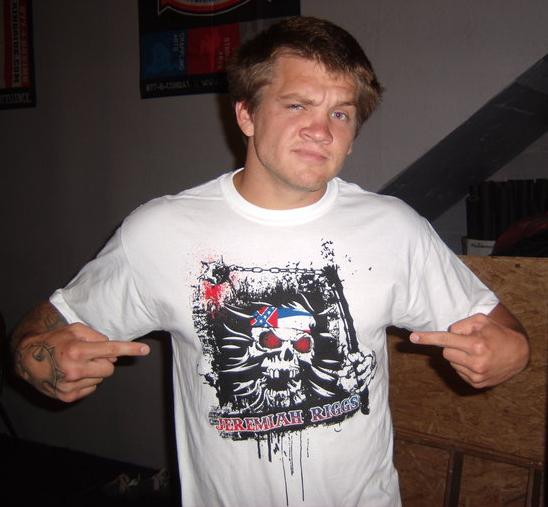
- Born: December 17, 1982 (age 43); Vicksburg, Mississippi, U.S.
- Other names: Bigg Rigg; Mississippi
- Nationality: American
- Height: 6 ft 0 in (1.83 m)
- Weight: 180 lb (82 kg; 13 st)
- Division: Middleweight; Welterweight
- Fighting out of: Springfield, Illinois, U.S.
- Team: Fiore MMA
- Years active: 2007-present

Mixed martial arts record
- Total: 15
- Wins: 7
- By knockout: 1
- By submission: 3
- By decision: 3
- Losses: 8
- By knockout: 1
- By submission: 5
- By decision: 2

Other information
- Mixed martial arts record from Sherdog

Jeremiah Riggs (born December 12, 1982) is an American professional wrestler, mixed martial artist and bare-knuckle boxer, currently competing in the middleweight division in the Bare Knuckle Fighting Championship (BKFC). A professional MMA competitor since 2007, Riggs has made a name for himself mainly fighting in the Midwest, and his home state of Mississippi. He was a competitor on SpikeTV's The Ultimate Fighter: Team Rampage vs Team Forrest as well as a contestant on WWE Tough Enough.

== Early life ==
Riggs was born and raised in Vicksburg, Mississippi. He is the son of an E-9 who served four years in the Coast Guard followed by 31 years in the National Guard. Riggs attended his local high school, playing baseball and football, lettering in both sports. After graduating high school Riggs went on to enroll into Mississippi Delta Community College where he was on the football team.

Upon graduating from college Riggs signed up with the United States Army and served a tour in Afghanistan with the 1st Ranger Battalion. After leaving the Army in 2005, Riggs worked around Mississippi driving trucks for a living; even owning his own trucking business.

== Mixed martial arts ==
Riggs made his professional debut against Craig Sjoerdsma in New Orleans, Louisiana. Riggs won the fight via submission from strikes in the first round. Riggs then fought Robert Thompson for the Southern Fighting Alliance middleweight title belt. The fight lasted all 5 rounds, and Riggs narrowly lost a decision. During the fight, one of Riggs' front teeth was knocked out. In 2007 Riggs sold his trucking company and moved to San Jose to train MMA with Frank Shamrock. Riggs was set to become part of the San Jose Razorclaws, an International Fight League team coached by Shamrock, but the team was disbanded by the IFL before the season began.

After the IFL dissolved Riggs was invited to be a part of season seven of The Ultimate Fighter. Riggs was paired against Dan Cramer in a preliminary match-up to see who obtained entry into the house. Riggs lost a decision, but earned the respect of UFC President Dana White and Quinton Jackson. After filming on TUF Riggs moved to Granite City, Illinois to train with Matt Hughes at The HIT Squad.

Riggs took a fight against up-and-comer Dom O'Grady, losing the fight via submission late in the last round of the fight. The loss was the start of a four-fight losing streak stretching from 2008 to 2010. During that time he saw defeat from soon-to-be teammate Ken Jackson, and future UFC fighter John Salter. Riggs broke the streak in February 2010 after pulling off an impressive triangle choke submission over Jesse Beale. After suffering his last loss Riggs went on a five fight winning streak; with wins coming inside the Bellator Fighting Championships, and Strikeforce. In 2011, Riggs officially retired from MMA to pursue a career in professional wrestling.

On March 16, 2012, Riggs officially came out of retirement at Bellator 61 in Bossier City, Louisiana to fight Trey Houston in a "Middleweight Tournament Qualifier". In 2015 Riggs walked away from MMA and pursued a career in bull riding, competing on small circuits in the midwest and southeast United States.

== Television career ==
After competing on The Ultimate Fighter Riggs was selected to go on VH1's hit reality show Daisy of Love. In an MMA fight arranged by the show's producers, Riggs defeated VH1 reality personality "12 Pack" which saw 12 Pack suffer a broken nose and sent to the hospital. Riggs finished fifth on the show.

When filming of Daisy of Love ended, Riggs was selected to be a part of another VH1 series I Love Money 3

Jeremiah Riggs
Personal information
- Born: December 17, 1982 (age 43) Vicksburg, Mississippi

Professional wrestling career
- Ring name(s): Jeremiah Riggs, Big Rigg, Mississippi
- Billed height: 6 ft 0 in (1.83 m)
- Billed weight: 200 lb (91 kg; 14 st)
- Trained by: Matt Hughes, Dutch Mantel, Bill DeMott

== Professional wrestling career ==
Riggs began his professional wrestling career training with Dutch Mantel in Murfreesboro, Tennessee.

=== WWE ===
In March 2011, he was announced as one of the fourteen contestants for the return of WWE Tough Enough on the USA Network. Throughout the show, Riggs was complimented on his heart and athleticism. He was nicknamed "MMA" by the trainers because of his mixed martial arts background. Along with Martin, he was one of just two contestants to not get stuck in the bottom three. Riggs finished third on the show, being eliminated in week nine because of his inexperience inside the ring.

In May 2011, Riggs made his debut for Florida Championship Wrestling, the developmental territory for the WWE. He defeated Peter Orlov in his first match as a part of the Tough Enough finale. However, Riggs was released after being informed that WWE had no interest in signing him following the tryout in FCW after rubbing officials and other wrestlers the wrong way.

== Filmography ==
Year	Title	Role	Notes
2007	The Ultimate Fighter	Himself	TV Series
2010	Daisy of Love	Himself	TV Series
2010	I Love Money season 3	Himself	Unaired
2011	WWE Tough Enough	Himself	TV Series
2015	Steve Austin's Broken Skull Challenge	Himself	TV Series

== Bare-knuckle boxing ==
=== Bare Knuckle Fighting Championship ===
Riggs made his BKFC debut at BKFC Fight Night 5 on January 29, 2022 and won by technical knockout in the first round.

Riggs faced Connor Tierney at BKFC Fight Night 6 on March 12, 2022 and lost by knockout in the fifth round.

Riggs faced Billy Wagner at BKFC Fight Night 9 on June 11, 2022 and lost by knockout due to an ankle injury in the first round.

Riggs faced former WBO interim light middleweight boxing champion Alfredo Angulo in a middleweight bout at BKFC Knucklemania IV on April 27, 2024. After throwing a flurry of punches to start the round, he was eventually knocked out in the first round. Riggs clearly was holding onto Alfredo's hair throughout the match, only releasing Angulo's braid when the referee was on the same side as the illegal grip.

== Mixed martial arts record ==
Professional record breakdown
15 matches	7 wins	8 losses
By knockout	3	1
By submission	1	5
By decision	3	2

Res.	Record	Opponent	Method	Event	Date	Round	Time	Location	Notes
Loss	7–8	Peter Aspenwal	Decision (split)	Bellator 101	September 27, 2013	3	5:00	Portland, Oregon, United States	
Loss	7–7	Kelvin Tiller	Submission (Kimura)	Bellator 70	May 25, 2012	3	3:38	New Orleans, Louisiana, United States	
Loss	7–6	Trey Houston	Submission (armbar)	Bellator 61	March 16, 2012	1	3:30	Bossier City, Louisiana, United States	
Win	7–5	Eric James Slocum	Decision (majority)	SportFight X: Middle Tennessee Mayhem	January 29, 2011	3	5:00	Murfreesboro, Tennessee, United States	
Win	6–5	James Sharp	Decision (unanimous)	Strikeforce Challengers: Wilcox vs. Ribeiro	November 19, 2010	3	5:00	Jackson, Mississippi, United States	
Win	5–5	Mike Fleniken	Decision (unanimous)	Bellator 30	September 23, 2010	3	5:00	Louisville, Kentucky, United States	
Win	4–5	Menden McKeehan	TKO (punches)	Absolute Cage Fights 12	July 16, 2010	1	0:17	Knoxville, Tennessee, United States	
Win	3–5	George Oiler	TKO (submission to punches)	Hardrock MMA 23	June 18, 2010	1	4:59	Albany, Kentucky, United States	
Loss	2–5	Keith Johnson	Submission (rear-naked choke)	Empire FC: A Night of Reckoning 3	April 23, 2010	2	4:34	Tunica, Mississippi, United States	
Win	2–4	Jesse Beal	Submission (triangle choke)	Empire FC: A Night of Reckoning 2	February 27, 2010	1	4:48	Tunica, Mississippi, United States	
Loss	1–4	Eric Irvin	Decision (unanimous)	Devastation Fight Club	January 30, 2010	3	3:00	Cape Girardeau, Missouri, United States	
Loss	1–3	John Salter	TKO (punches)	CCCW: The 3rd Degree	October 17, 2009	1	4:44	Springfield, Illinois, United States	
Loss	1–2	Ken Jackson	Submission (rear-naked choke)	Arkansas MMA: Ultimate Fight Night 6	November 28, 2009	1	3:07	Fort Smith, Arkansas, United States	
Loss	1–1	Dom O'Grady	Submission (guillotine choke)	XFO 25: Outdoor War 4	August 9, 2008	3	4:16	Island Lake, Illinois, United States	
Win	1–0	Craig Sjoerdsma	TKO (submission to punches)	Ultimate Cage Fighting: Rage in the Cage	September 22, 2007	1	N/A	New Orleans, United States	

== Bare knuckle boxing record ==
Professional record breakdown
4 matches	1 win	3 losses
By knockout	1	3

Res.	Record	Opponent	Method	Event	Date	Round	Time	Location	Notes
Loss	1–3	Alfredo Angulo	KO (punches)	BKFC Knucklemania IV	April 27, 2024	1	1:07	Los Angeles, California, United States	
Loss	1–2	Billy Wagner	TKO (ankle injury)	BKFC Fight Night: Jackson 2: Belcher vs. Tate	June 11, 2022	1	1:59	Jackson, Mississippi, United States	
Loss	1–1	Connor Tierney	KO (punch)	BKFC Fight Night New York 2: Grant vs. Retic	March 12, 2022	5	1:31	Salamanca, New York, United States	
Win	1–0	Eric Thompson	TKO (punch)	BKFC Fight Night Jackson: Brito vs. Harris II	January 29, 2022	1	1:39	Jackson, Mississippi, United States	
