= 2022 in Bare Knuckle Fighting Championship =

Information
- First date: January 29, 2022
- Last date: December 10, 2022

Events
- Total events: 23

Fights
- Total fights: 246
- Title fights: 20

Chronology
2021 in BKFC	2022 in Bare Knuckle Fighting Championship	2023 in BKFC

The year 2022 was the fifth year in the history of the Bare Knuckle Fighting Championship, a bare-knuckle fighting promotion based in Philadelphia.

== Background ==
The 2022 season started with Bare Knuckle Fighting Championship Fight Night: Jackson. BKFC is available on PPV all over the world and on FITE TV.

== List of events ==
#	Event	Date	Venue	Location
1	BKFC Fight Night Jackson: Brito vs. Harris II	January 29, 2022	Jackson Convention Complex	(United States) Jackson, Mississippi, USA
2	BKFC KnuckleMania 2	February 19, 2022	Seminole Hard Rock Hotel & Casino Hollywood	(United States) Hollywood, Florida, USA
3	BKFC Fight Night New York 2: Grant vs. Retic	March 12, 2022	Seneca Allegany Resort & Casino Event Center	(United States) Salamanca, New York, USA
4	BKFC 23: Richman vs. Rickels	April 8, 2022	Intrust Bank Arena	(United States) Wichita, Kansas, USA
5	BKFC Fight Night: Ft. Lauderdale: Beltran vs. Tate	April 21, 2022	Charles F. Dodge City Center	(United States) Pembroke Pines, Florida, USA
6	BKFC 24: Hunt vs. Riggs	April 30, 2022	Montana Expo Park	(United States) Great Falls, Montana, USA
7	BKFC 25: Adams vs. Cleckler	May 6, 2022	Caribe Royale Orlando	(United States) Orlando, Florida, USA
8	BKFC Thailand 2: Iconic Impact	May 7, 2022	Royal Cliff Hotels Group	Pattaya, Thailand
9	BKFC Fight Night Omaha: Cochrane vs. Dyer	May 13, 2022	Liberty First Credit Union Arena	(United States) Omaha, Nebraska, USA
10	BKFC Fight Night: Jackson 2: Belcher vs. Tate	June 11, 2022	Jackson Convention Complex	(United States) Jackson, Mississippi, USA
11	BKFC 26 Hollywood, FL: Brito vs. Palomino	June 24, 2022	Seminole Hard Rock Hotel & Casino	(United States) Hollywood, Florida, USA
12	BKFC Fight Night Tampa 2: Grant vs. Barnett	July 23, 2022	Florida State Fairgrounds	(United States) Tampa, Florida, USA
13	BKFC 27 London: MVP vs. Platinum	August 20, 2022	Wembley Arena	London, England
14	BKFC 28 Albuquerque: Ferea vs. Starling	August 27, 2022	Rio Rancho Events Center	(United States) Albuquerque, New Mexico, USA
15	BKFC Thailand 3: Moment of Truth	September 3, 2022	CentralWorld Live at 8floor	Bangkok, Thailand
16	BKFC 29 Montana 2: Hart vs. Sigala	September 10, 2022	Pacific Steel & Recycling Arena	(United States) Great Falls, Montana, USA
17	BKFC 30 Monroe: Hunt vs. Henry	October 1, 2022	Fant Ewing Coliseum	(United States) Monroe, Louisiana, USA
18	BKFC 31 Denver: Richman vs. Doolittle	October 15, 2022	1st Bank Center	(United States) Denver, Colorado, USA
19	BKFC 32 Orlando: Barnett vs. Herrera	November 5, 2022	Caribe Royale	(United States) Orlando, Florida, USA
20	BKFC 33 Omaha: Beltran vs. Alexander	November 18, 2022	Liberty First Arena	(United States) Omaha, Nebraska, USA
21	BKFC Fight Night Newcastle: Terrill vs. Banks	November 26, 2022	Walker Activity Dome	(England) Newcastle, United Kingdom
22	BKFC 34 Hollywood, FL: Palomino vs. Shoaff	December 3, 2022	Seminole Hard Rock Hotel & Casino	(United States) Hollywood, Florida, USA
23	BKFC Asia 4: The Big Bash	December 10, 2022	SpacePlus Bangkok RCA	Bangkok, Thailand

== BKFC Fight Night Jackson: Brito vs. Harris II ==
BKFC Fight Night Jackson: Brito vs. Harris II
- Promotion: Bare Knuckle Fighting Championship
- Date: January 29, 2022
- Venue: Jackson Convention Complex
- City: (United States) Jackson, Mississippi

BKFC Fight Night Jackson: Brito vs. Harris II (also known as BKFC Fight Night 5) was a bare-knuckle fighting event held by Bare Knuckle Fighting Championship on January 29, 2022, at the Jackson Convention Complex in Jackson, Mississippi, USA.

=== Background ===
The event featured a rematch between Elvin Brito and Kaleb Harris for the inaugural BKFC Welterweight Championship.

Bonus awards

The following fighters were awarded bonuses:

- Fight of the Night: Elvin Brito vs. Kaleb Harris
- Knockout of the Night: Alan Belcher

=== Results ===
BKFC Fight Night Jackson: Brito vs. Harris II
Weight Class				Method	Round	Time	Notes
Welterweight 75 kg	(Puerto Rico) Elvin Brito	def.	(United States) Kaleb Harris	Decision (split)	5	2:00	For the Inaugural BKFC Welterweight Championship. 48-47, 47-48, 49-46.
Heavyweight 120 kg	(United States) Alan Belcher	def.	(United States) Bobo O'Bannon	KO (punch)	1	1:48	
Heavyweight 120 kg	(United States) Quentin Henry	def.	(United States) Chris Sarro	TKO (doctor stoppage)	2	5:00	
Light Heavyweight 84 kg	(United States) Jared Warren	def.	(United States) Scott O'Shaughnessy	TKO (punches)	1	5:00	
Middleweight 80 kg	(United States) Jeremiah Riggs	def.	(United States) Eric Thompson	TKO (punch)	1	1:39	
Light Heavyweight 84 kg	(United States) Brandon Johnson	def.	(United States) Ryan Jones	TKO (punches)	2	2:00	
W.Flyweight 57 kg	(United States) Crystal Pittman	def.	(United States) Audra Cummings	Decision (unanimous)	5	2:00	50-43, 50-43, 49-44
Welterweight 75 kg	(United States) Wade Johnson	def.	(United States) Nathan Mitchell	TKO (punches)	5	0:30	
Preliminary Card
W.Flyweight 57 kg	(Poland) Martyna Krol	def.	(United States) Jocelyn Jones-Lybarger	TKO (doctor stoppage)	3	2:00	
Flyweight 57 kg	(United States) David Diaz	def.	(United States) Albert Inclan	Decision (unanimous)	5	2:00	49-45, 49-45, 49-45

== BKFC KnuckleMania 2 ==
BKFC KnuckleMania 2
- Promotion: Bare Knuckle Fighting Championship
- Date: February 19, 2022
- Venue: Seminole Hard Rock Hotel & Casino
- City: (United States) Hollywood, Florida

BKFC KnuckleMania 2 was a bare-knuckle fighting event held by Bare Knuckle Fighting Championship on February 19, 2022, at the Jackson Convention Complex in Hollywood, Florida, USA.

=== Background ===
The main event featured a world title fight for the BKFC Lightweight Championship between the champion Luis Palomino and the challenger Martin Brown.

The event featured the BKFC debut of former UFC fighters Chad Mendes and Mike Perry.

The event also featured a fight for the vacant BKFC Women's Flyweight Championship Christine Ferea and Britain Hart.

Bonus awards

The following fighters were awarded bonuses:

- Fight of the Night: Mike Perry vs. Julian Lane
- Knockout of the Night: Gustavo Trujillo

=== Results ===
BKFC KnuckleMania 2
Weight Class				Method	Round	Time	Notes
Lightweight 70 kg	(Peru) Luis Palomino (c)	def.	(United States) Martin Brown	Decision (unanimous)	5	2:00	For the BKFC Lightweight Championship. 49-46, 49-46, 50-45.
Middleweight 79 kg	(United States) Mike Perry	def.	(United States) Julian Lane	Decision (unanimous)	5	2:00	48-46, 48-46, 48-46
Lightweight 70 kg	(United States) Chad Mendes	def.	(United States) Joshuah Alvarez	TKO (punches)	4	1:34	
W.Flyweight 57 kg	(United States) Christine Ferea	def.	(United States) Britain Hart	Decision (unanimous)	5	2:00	For the vacant BKFC Women's Flyweight Championship. 48-47, 48-47, 49-46.
Heavyweight 120 kg	(Cuba) Gustavo Trujillo	def.	(United States) Stephen Townsel	KO (punches)	1	1:41	
W.Flyweight 57 kg	(United States) Christine Vicens	def.	(Canada) Jade Masson-Wong	TKO (doctor stoppage)	3	0:49	
Middleweight 79 kg	(United States) Francesco Ricchi	def.	(United States) Jake Bostwick	Decision (unanimous)	5	2:00	48-44, 48-44, 48-44
Light Heavyweight 84 kg	(Cuba) Uly Diaz	def.	(United States) Sawyer Depee	KO (punches)	2	1:00	
Featherweight 66 kg	(United States) Edgard Plazaola	def.	(United States) Chevvy Bridges	TKO (punches)	3	1:09	
Preliminary Card
Middleweight 79 kg	(Cuba) Yosdenis Cedeno	def.	(Cuba) Mario Vargas	Decision (unanimous)	5	2:00	48-45, 49-44, 47-46
Middleweight 79 kg	(Dominican Republic) John Michael Escoboza	def.	(United States) Zion Tomlinson	KO (punches)	4	1:16	

== BKFC Fight Night New York 2: Grant vs. Retic ==
BKFC Fight Night New York 2: Grant vs. Retic
- Promotion: Bare Knuckle Fighting Championship
- Date: March 12, 2022
- Venue: Seneca Allegany Resort & Casino Event Center
- City: (United States) Salamanca, New York

BKFC Fight Night New York 2: Grant vs. Retic (also known as BKFC Fight Night 6) was a bare-knuckle fighting event held by Bare Knuckle Fighting Championship on March 12, 2022 at the Seneca Allegany Resort & Casino Event Center in Miami, USA.

=== Background ===
The event featured the promotion's return to New York.

A BKFC Bantamweight Championship fight between the defending champion Johnny Bedford and Jarod Grant was Originally scheduled to headline the card. However, Bedford had to pull out from the bout due to injury. Anthony Retic steep in on late notice to face Grant for the interim BKFC Bantamweight Championship.

Bonus awards

The following fighters were awarded bonuses:

- Fight of the Night: Charisa Sigala vs. Angela Danzig
- Knockout of the Night: Connor Tierney

=== Results ===
BKFC Fight Night New York 2: Grant vs. Retic
Weight Class				Method	Round	Time	Notes
Bantamweight 61 kg	(United States) Jarod Grant	def.	(United States) Anthony Retic	Decision (unanimous)	5	2:00	For the interim BKFC Bantamweight Championship. 49-46, 49-46, 48-46.
Welterweight 77 kg	(England) Connor Tierney	def.	(United States) Jeremiah Riggs	KO (punch)	5	1:31	
Welterweight 75 kg	(United States) Dustin Pague	def.	(United States) Eddie Hoch	TKO (referee stoppage)	1	0:45	
Lightweight 72 kg	(United States) Matt Phillips	def.	(United States) Manuel Moreira	Decision (unanimous)	5	2:00	50-44, 50-44, 50-44
W.Strawweight 52 kg	(United States) Charisa Sigala	vs.	(Germany) Angela Danzig	Draw (majority)	5	2:00	48-47, 47-47, 47-47
Bantamweight 61 kg	(United States) Jack Grady	def.	(United States) Gabe Sacchetti	TKO (referee stoppage)	2	1:14	
Heavyweight 120 kg	(United States) Zachary Calmus	def.	(United States) Kyle McElroy	Decision (unanimous)	5	2:00	48-47, 48-47, 49-46
Flyweight 57 kg	(Canada) Devin Gibson	def.	(United States) Kody Murray	TKO (referee stoppage)	4	1:44	
Preliminary Card
Middleweight 79 kg	(Romania) Stanislav Grosu	def.	(United States) Christian Torres	KO (punch)	1	1:01	
Middleweight 79 kg	(United States) Damon Bell	def.	(United States) Art Driscoll	TKO (doctor stoppage)	2	0:37	
Bantamweight 61 kg	(United States) Lardy Navarro	def.	(United States) Anthony Prater	TKO (referee stoppage)	1	1:22	

== BKFC 23: Richman vs. Rickels ==
BKFC 23: Richman vs. Rickels
- Promotion: Bare Knuckle Fighting Championship
- Date: April 8, 2022
- Venue: Intrust Bank Arena
- City: (United States) Wichita, Kansas

BKFC 23: Richman vs. Rickels was a bare-knuckle fighting event to be held by Bare Knuckle Fighting Championship on April 8, 2022, at the Intrust Bank Arena in Wichita, Kansas, USA.

=== Background ===
The event featured the promotion's return to Kansas.

A middleweight bout between two Bellator veterant Mike Richman and David Rickels served as the event headliner.

Bonus awards

The following fighters were awarded bonuses:

- Fight of the Night: Isaac Doolittle vs. Jared Warren
- Knockout of the Night: Kenny Licea

=== Results ===
BKFC 23: Richman vs. Rickels
Weight Class				Method	Round	Time	Notes
Middleweight 80 kg	(United States) Mike Richman	def.	(United States) David Rickels	KO (punch)	2	0:32	BKFC Middleweight title eliminator.
Light Heavyweight 84 kg	(United States) Isaac Doolittle	def.	(United States) Jared Warren	Decision (majority)	5	2:00	BKFC Light Heavyweight title eliminator. 47-47, 48-46, 48-46
Middleweight 80 kg	(United States) Jake Lindsey	def.	(United States) Derrick Findley	TKO (corner stoppage)	4	2:00	
Flyweight 57 kg	(United States) Marciano Hernandez	def.	(United States) Jerald Gregori	TKO (punches)	1	0:41	
W.Flyweight 57 kg	(United States) Jessica Link	def.	(United States) Crystal Pittman	Decision (unanimous)	5	2:00	50-45, 50-45, 48-47
Featherweight 66 kg	(United States) Stevo Morris	def.	(United States) LJ Hermreck	KO (punch)	4	0:44	
Flyweight 57 kg	(United States) Tyler Randall	def.	(United States) Josh Richey	KO (punch)	3	1:57	
Lightweight 70 kg	(United States) Antonio Soto III	def.	(United States) Shawn Moffett	KO (punch)	2	1:20	
Preliminary Card
Flyweight 57 kg	(United States) Chancey Wilson	def.	(United States) Justyn Martinez	TKO (punches)	1	1:36	
Heavyweight 120 kg	(United States) Kenny Licea	def.	(United States) Noah Cutter	KO (punch)	2	0:30	
Featherweight 66 kg	(United States) Edmund Santos	vs.	(United States) Nick Villar	Draw (majority)	5	2:00	48-46, 47-47, 47-47

== BKFC Fight Night: Ft. Lauderdale: Beltran vs. Tate ==
BKFC Fight Night: Ft. Lauderdale: Beltran vs. Tate
- Promotion: Bare Knuckle Fighting Championship
- Date: April 21, 2022
- Venue: Charles A. Dodge Center
- City: (United States) Fort Lauderdale, Florida

BKFC Fight Night: Ft. Lauderdale: Beltran vs. Tate (also known as BKFC Fight Night 7) was a bare-knuckle fighting event held by Bare Knuckle Fighting Championship on April 21, 2022 in Fort Lauderdale, Florida, USA.

=== Background ===
The event featured the return of former UFC fighter Joey Beltran in his first fight since losing the BKFC Heavyweight Championship.

=== Results ===
BKFC Fight Night: Ft. Lauderdale: Beltran vs. Tate
Weight Class				Method	Round	Time	Notes
Heavyweight 120 kg	(United States) Frank Tate	def.	(United States) Joey Beltran	KO (punches)	1	0:23	
Lightweight 70 kg	(Wales) James Lilley	def.	(United States) Adam Pellerano	KO (punch)	1	0:40	
Lightweight 70 kg	(United States) Tom Shoaff	def.	(Canada) Bruce Lutchmedial	TKO (punches)	3	1:59	
Featherweight 66 kg	(United States) Howard Davis	def.	(United States) Josh Wright	KO (punch)	3	2:00	
Light Heavyweight 84 kg	(United States) Doug Coltrane	def.	(United States) Eduardo Concepcion	Decision (unanimous)	5	2:00	48-46, 47-46, 47-46
Light Heavyweight 84 kg	(United States) Ravon Baxter	def.	(United States) Leonel Carrera	Decision (split)	5	2:00	46-48, 48-46, 48-46
Lightweight 70 kg	(United States) Bryan Duran	def.	(United States) Glendale Futrell	TKO (doctor stoppage)	2	2:00	
Lightweight 70 kg	(United States) Juston Stills	def.	(United States) Joshua Famez	Decision (unanimous)	5	2:00	50-45, 50-45, 50-45
Preliminary Card
Cruiserweight 93 kg	(United States) Jeremy Smith	def.	(United States) Davian Green	KO (punch)	3	0:40	
Middleweight 79 kg	(North Macedonia) Gorjan Slaveski	def.	(Azerbaijan) Ramal Amanov	TKO (punches)	1	1:20	
Bantamweight 61 kg	(United States) Vinny Turiello	def.	(United States) Rob Fuller	KO (punches)	1	2:00	

== BKFC 24: Hunt vs. Riggs ==
BKFC 24: Hunt vs. Riggs
- Promotion: Bare Knuckle Fighting Championship
- Date: April 30, 2022
- Venue: Montana Expo Park
- City: (United States) Great Falls, Montana

BKFC 24: Hunt vs. Riggs was a bare-knuckle fighting event held by Bare Knuckle Fighting Championship on April 30, 2022, at the Montana Expo Park in Great Falls, Montana, USA.

=== Background ===
The event featured the promotion's return to Montana.

A BKFC Light Heavyweight Championship bout between current champion Lorenzo Hunt and the challenger Joe Riggs headlined the event.

Bonus awards

The following fighters were awarded bonuses:

- Fight of the Night: Drew Angelcor vs. Timmy Mason
- Knockout of the Night: Billy Wagner

=== Results ===
BKFC 24: Hunt vs. Riggs
Weight Class				Method	Round	Time	Notes
Light Heavyweight 84 kg	(United States) Lorenzo Hunt (c)	def.	(United States) Joe Riggs	KO (punches)	2	1:12	For the BKFC Light Heavyweight Championship
Featherweight 66 kg	(United States) Rusty Crowder	def.	(United States) Louie Lopez	TKO (doctor stoppage)	1	2:00	
Cruiserweight 93 kg	(United States) Leo Pla	def.	(United States) Leo Bercier	TKO (referee stoppage)	3	1:17	
W.Flyweight 57 kg	(United States) Andy Nguyen	def.	(United States) Cassie Robb	Decision (unanimous)	5	2:00	50-45, 50-45, 50-45
Featherweight 66 kg	(United States) Kai Stewart	def.	(United States) Daniel Gary	KO (punch)	1	1:10	
Light Heavyweight 84 kg	(United States) Sawyer Depee	def.	(United States) Will Dunkle	TKO (punches)	1	1:17	
Welterweight 75 kg	(United States) Billy Wagner	def.	(United States) Jake Kreitel	KO (punches)	1	0:43	
Lightweight 70 kg	(United States) Andrew Angelcor	def.	(United States) Timmy Mason	Decision (unanimous)	5	2:00	48-45, 48-45, 48-45
Middleweight 79 kg	(United States) Dallas Davison	def.	(United States) Erik Lopez	TKO (retirement)	2	1:08	
Preliminary Card
Middleweight 79 kg	(United States) Braeden Tovey	def.	(United States) Jordan Christensen	TKO (medical stoppage)	4	2:00	
Light Heavyweight 84 kg	(United States) James Dennis	def.	(United States) Brian Maxwell	TKO (punch)	2	0:26	
Featherweight 66 kg	(United States) Dylan Schulte	def.	(United States) Darrick Gates	KO (punch)	1	0:20	

== BKFC 25: Adams vs. Cleckler ==
BKFC 25: Adams vs. Cleckler
- Promotion: Bare Knuckle Fighting Championship
- Date: May 6, 2022
- Venue: Caribe Royale Orlando
- City: (United States) Orlando, Florida

BKFC 25: Adams vs. Cleckler was a bare-knuckle fighting event held by Bare Knuckle Fighting Championship on May 6, 2022, at the Caribe Royale Orlando in Orlando, Florida, USA.

=== Background ===
The event featured the promotion's return to Florida.

A BKFC Heavyweight Championship bout between current champion Arnold Adams and the challenger Dillon Cleckler served as the event headliner. This also featured the debut of former WWE wrestler Jack Claffey.

Bonus awards

The following fighters were awarded bonuses:

- Fight of the Night: Jack Claffey vs. Rick Caruso
- Knockout of the Night: Arnold Adams

=== Results ===
BKFC 25: Adams vs. Cleckler
Weight Class				Method	Round	Time	Notes
Heavyweight 120 kg	(United States) Arnold Adams (c)	def.	(United States) Dillon Cleckler	KO (punches)	2	0:34	For the BKFC Heavyweight Championship
Light Heavyweight 84 kg	(United States) David Mundell	def.	(United States) Julian Lane	Decision (unanimous)	5	2:00	48-47, 48-47, 48-47
Light Heavyweight 84 kg	(United States) Jay Jackson	def.	(United States) Terry Janoski	KO (punches)	5	0:32	
Featherweight 66 kg	(England) Jack Claffey	def.	(United States) Rick Caruso	KO (punch)	3	1:15	
Heavyweight 120 kg	(United States) Warren Thompson	def.	(United States) Art Parker	Decision (unanimous)	5	2:00	49-46, 50-45, 48-47
Heavyweight 120 kg	(Brazil) Levi Costa	def.	(United States) Joshua Sanchez	KO (punches)	1	1:35	
Cruiserweight 93 kg	(United States) Gabriel Mota	def.	(United States) Travis Lerchen	KO (punch)	1	0:37	
Lightweight 70 kg	(United States) Henry Williams	def.	(United States) Sterling Lenz	TKO (doctor stoppage)	1	1:10	
Flyweight 57 kg	(United States) Daniel Alvarez	def.	(Philippines) JR Ridge	TKO (doctor stoppage)	1	1:37	
Preliminary Card
Bantamweight 61 kg	(United States) Ryan Reber	def.	(United States) Micah Mitchell	TKO (corner stoppage)	2	2:00	
Cruiserweight 93 kg	(United States) Idrees Wasi	def.	(United States) John McAllister	KO (punches)	1	1:59	
Featherweight 66 kg	(United States) Travis Floyd	def.	(United States) Robert Armas	TKO (corner stoppage)	3	2:00	

== BKFC Thailand 2: Iconic Impact ==
BKFC Thailand 2: Iconic Impact
- Promotion: Bare Knuckle Fighting Championship
- Date: May 7, 2022
- Venue: Royal Cliff Hotels Group
- City: (Thailand) Pattaya

BKFC Thailand 2: Iconic Impact was a bare-knuckle fighting event held by Bare Knuckle Fighting Championship on May 7, 2022, in Pattaya, Thailand.

=== Background ===
In the main event, Sirimongkol Singmanasak and Mike Vetrila competed for the inaugural BKFC Thailand Light Heavyweight Championship.

The co-main event saw Souris Manfredi facing Fani Peloumpi for the inaugural BKFC Thailand Women's Strawweight Championship.

=== Results ===
BKFC Thailand 2: Iconic Impact
Weight Class				Method	Round	Time	Notes
Light Heavyweight 84 kg	(Thailand) Sirimongkol Singmanasak	def.	(Russia) Mike Vetrila	Decision (majority)	5	2:00	For the inaugural BKFC Thailand Light Heavyweight Championship. 49-48, 48-48, 49-48.
W.Strawweight 52 kg	(Greece) Fani Peloumpi	def.	(France) Souris Manfredi	Decision (split)	5	2:00	For the inaugural BKFC Thailand Women's Strawweight Championship. 49-48, 47-48, 49-48.
Heavyweight 120 kg	(United States) Steve Banks	def.	(Iran) Akbar Karimi	KO (punch)	2	0:14	
Welterweight 75 kg	(Iran) Keivan Soleimani	def.	(Thailand) Paitoon Jaikom	Decision (unanimous)	5	2:00	48-46, 50-48, 50-44
Lightweight 70 kg	(Thailand) Maseng Kantiphong	def.	(Thailand) Naeem Binhar	Decision (unanimous)	5	2:00	49-47, 48-47, 48-47
Featherweight 66 kg	(Thailand) Pongpisan Chunyong	def.	(Thailand) Sudan Kulubon	KO (punches)	1	1:50	
Welterweight 75 kg	(England) TJ Chang	def.	(Brazil) Fabiano Hawthorne	Decision (unanimous)	5	2:00	48-45, 49-44, 50-46
Lightweight 70 kg	(Thailand) Sadudee Srimueang	def.	(Thailand) Phatiphan Krungklang	TKO (shoulder injury)	3	2:00	
Flyweight 57 kg	(Thailand) Thanathorn Kamran	def.	(Thailand) Thodsaphon Wannahat	KO (punches)	1	1:23	
W.Catchweight 60 kg	(Thailand) Usanakorn Thawilsuhannawang	def.	(Thailand) Benjamas Phakra	KO (punches)	3	0:49	

== BKFC Fight Night Omaha: Cochrane vs. Dyer ==
BKFC Fight Night Omaha: Cochrane vs. Dyer
- Promotion: Bare Knuckle Fighting Championship
- Date: May 13, 2022
- Venue: Liberty First Credit Union Arena
- City: (United States) Omaha, Nebraska

BKFC Fight Night Omaha: Cochrane vs. Dyer (also known as BKFC Fight Night 8) was a bare-knuckle fighting event held by Bare Knuckle Fighting Championship on May 13, 2022, at the Liberty First Credit Union Arena in Omaha, Nebraska, USA.

=== Background ===
The event featured the promotion's return to Omaha.

The originally planned main event of a rematch between Bec Rawlings and Britain Hart was cancelled due to Hart having a medical emergency. The light heavyweight bout between Dakota Cochrane and Josh Dyer served as the new main event.

=== Results ===
BKFC Fight Night Omaha: Cochrane vs. Dyer
Weight Class				Method	Round	Time	Notes
Light Heavyweight 84 kg	(United States) Josh Dyer	def.	(United States) Dakota Cochrane	KO (punches)	1	1:39	
Cruiserweight 93 kg	(United States) Houston Alexander	def.	(United States) Jason Fish	TKO (punches)	1	1:41	
Lightweight 70 kg	(United States) Sean Wilson	def.	(United States) Rocky Long	Decision (unanimous)	5	2:00	50-45, 50-45, 50-45
Featherweight 66 kg	(United States) Will Shutt	def.	(United States) Cody Land	KO (punch)	1	0:40	
Light Heavyweight 84 kg	(United States) David Simpson	def.	(United States) Jeff Souder	KO (punch)	2	1:46	
Cruiserweight 93 kg	(United States) Ryan Braun	def.	(United States) Jett Jones	KO (punch)	1	1:27	
Middleweight 79 kg	(United States) Alonzo Martinez	def.	(United States) Adalberto Serrano	KO (punch)	1	0:34	
Welterweight 75 kg	(United States) Carlos Trinidad-Snake	vs.	(United States) Tyler Jacques	KO (punch)	4	0:44	
Preliminary Card
Heavyweight 120 kg	(United States) Esteban Rodriguez	def.	(United States) Erick Murray Jr.	KO (punch)	2	0:10	
Featherweight 66 kg	(United States) Josh Krejci	vs.	(United States) TJ Benson	TKO (punches)	4	1:42	
Lightweight 70 kg	(United States) Emeka Ifekandu	vs.	(United States) Charlie Dubray	KO (punch)	3	1:49	

== BKFC Fight Night: Jackson 2: Belcher vs. Tate ==
BKFC Fight Night: Jackson 2: Belcher vs. Tate
- Promotion: Bare Knuckle Fighting Championship
- Date: June 11, 2022
- Venue: Jackson Convention Complex
- City: (United States) Jackson, Mississippi

Bare Knuckle Fighting Championship Fight Night: Jackson 2 (also known as BKFC Fight Night 9) was a bare-knuckle fighting event held by Bare Knuckle Fighting Championship on June 11, 2022, at the Jackson Convention Complex in Jackson, Mississippi, USA.

=== Background ===
The event marked the promotion's return to Jackson, Mississippi.

The main event featured a heavyweight bout between the former UFC fighter Alan Belcher and Frank Tate.

Bonus awards

The following fighter was awarded a bonus:

- Knockout of the Night: Alan Belcher

=== Results ===
BKFC Fight Night: Jackson 2: Belcher vs. Tate
Weight Class				Method	Round	Time	Notes
Heavyweight 120 kg	(United States) Alan Belcher	def.	(United States) Frank Tate	KO (punch)	1	1:21	
Lightweight 70 kg	(United States) Robbie Peralta	def.	(United States) Martin Brown	Decision (split)	5	2:00	47-48, 48-47, 49-47
Light Heavyweight 84 kg	(United States) Quentin Henry	def.	(United States) Sawyer Depee	KO (punch)	2	0:18	
Welterweight 75 kg	(United States) Billy Wagner	def.	(United States) Jeremiah Riggs	TKO (ankle injury)	1	1:59	
Lightweight 70 kg	(United States) Bobby Taylor	def.	(United States) Arthur Walcott-Ceesay	KO (punches)	1	1:36	
Welterweight 75 kg	(United States) Brad Kelly	def.	(Romania) Stanislav Grosu	TKO (punches)	3	1:01	
Middleweight 79 kg	(United States) Brett Williams	def.	(United States) Frankie Shughart	KO (punch)	1	1:01	
Preliminary Card
Featherweight 66 kg	(United States) Tyler Sammis	def.	(United States) Phil Ramer	KO (punches)	1	1:00	
Welterweight 75 kg	(United States) Tim Hester	def.	(United States) Christian Torres	Decision (unanimous)	5	2:00	50-44, 49-45, 49-46

== BKFC 26 Hollywood, FL: Brito vs. Palomino ==
BKFC 26 Hollywood, FL: Brito vs. Palomino
- Promotion: Bare Knuckle Fighting Championship
- Date: June 24, 2022
- Venue: Seminole Hard Rock Hotel & Casino
- City: (United States) Hollywood, Florida

BKFC 26 Hollywood, FL: Brito vs. Palomino was a bare-knuckle fighting event held by Bare Knuckle Fighting Championship on June 24, 2022, at the Seminole Hard Rock Hotel & Casino in Hollywood, Florida, USA.

=== Background ===
A BKFC Welterweight Championship bout between the current BKFC welterweight champion Elvin Brito and the current BKFC lightweight champion Luis Palomino served as the event headliner.

The event featured a rematch in the women's Flyweight division between Bec Rawlings and Britain Hart. The pairing previously met in 2018 prior at BKFC 2, which Rawlings won via split decision. They were previously scheduled to fight May 13 at BKFC Fight Night: Omaha, but the bout was canceled due to Hart having a medical emergency.

Former UFC contender Jimmie Rivera made his BKFC debut against Howard Davis on this card.

Bonus awards

The following fighters were awarded bonuses:

- Fight of the Night: Luis Palomino vs. Elvin Brito

=== Results ===
BKFC 26 Hollywood, FL: Brito vs. Palomino
Weight Class				Method	Round	Time	Notes
Welterweight 75 kg	(Peru) Luis Palomino	def.	(Puerto Rico) Elvin Brito (c)	Decision (unanimous)	5	2:00	For the BKFC Welterweight Championship. 48-47, 48-47, 49-46.
Middleweight 79 kg	(United States) Francesco Ricchi	def.	(Cuba) Uly Diaz	TKO (doctor stoppage)	1	1:16	For the interim BKFC Middleweight Championship
W.Flyweight 57 kg	(United States) Britain Hart	def.	(Australia) Bec Rawlings	Decision (unanimous)	5	2:00	49-46, 49-46, 48-47
Featherweight 66 kg	(United States) Howard Davis	vs.	(United States) Jimmie Rivera	Draw (majority)	5	2:00	49-45, 47-47, 47-47
Lightweight 70 kg	(United States) Bryan Duran	def.	(United States) Braeden Tovey	KO (punches)	1	1:15	
Light Heavyweight 84 kg	(United States) Blake Davis	def.	(United States) Cody Beierle	TKO (doctor stoppage)	1	1:54	
Welterweight 75 kg	(North Macedonia) Gorjan Slaveski	def.	(United States) Juston Stills	KO (punch)	1	1:06	
Flyweight 57 kg	(United States) Cary Caprio	def.	(United States) Tyler Randall	TKO (punches)	3	1:45	
Preliminary card
Heavyweight 120 kg	(United States) Stephen Townsel	def.	(United States) Chris Sarro	TKO (punches)	4	1:14	
Featherweight 66 kg	(Cuba) Freddy Masabo	def.	(United States) Will Shutt	KO (punch)	2	1:21	

== BKFC Fight Night Tampa 2: Grant vs. Barnett ==
BKFC Fight Night Tampa 2: Grant vs. Barnett
- Promotion: Bare Knuckle Fighting Championship
- Date: July 23, 2022
- Venue: Florida State Fairgrounds
- City: (United States) Tampa, Florida

BKFC Fight Night Tampa 2: Grant vs. Barnett (also known as BKFC Fight Night 10) will be a bare-knuckle fighting event to be held by Bare Knuckle Fighting Championship on July 23, 2022, at the Florida State Fairgrounds in Tampa, Florida, USA.

Bonus awards

The following fighters were awarded bonuses:

- Fight of the Night: Heinrich Coorssen vs. Rynell Riley
- Knockout of the Night: David Mundell

=== Results ===
BKFC Fight Night Tampa 2: Grant vs. Barnett
Weight Class				Method	Round	Time	Notes
Bantamweight 61 kg	(United States) Reggie Barnett Jr.	def.	(United States) Jarod Grant (ic)	Technical Decision (accidental eye poke)	5	0:41	For the interim BKFC Bantamweight Championship. 40-36, 40-36, 40-36.
Light Heavyweight 84 kg	(Dominican Republic) Jared Warren	def.	(United States) John Michael Escoboza	Decision (unanimous)	5	2:00	49-46, 49-45, 48-47.
Light Heavyweight 84 kg	(United States) David Mundell	def.	(United States) David Simpson	TKO	5	1:06	
Welterweight 75 kg	(Paraguay) Heinrich Coorssen	def.	(United States) Rynell Riley	KO	3	1:49	
Heavyweight 120 kg	(United States) Ryan Shough	def.	(United States) Joshua Sanchez	TKO	3	1:06	
Bantamweight 61 kg	(United States) Ryan Reber	def.	(United States) Rick Caruso	TKO (doctor stoppage)	4	2:00	
Featherweight 66 kg	(United States) Brenden Allen	def.	(United States) Stevo Morris	Decision (unanimous)	5	2:00	50-43, 50-43, 49-44
Lightweight 70 kg	(United States) Henry Williams	def.	(United States) Tim Hester	TKO	1	1:19	
Flyweight 57 kg	(Philippines) Joshua Ridge	def.	(United States) Justyn Martinez	KO (punch)	3	1:31	
Featherweight 66 kg	(United States) Alex Tierney	vs.	(United States) Darrick Gates	No Contest (accidental headbutt)	1	1:11	

== BKFC 27 London: MVP vs. Platinum ==
BKFC 27 London: MVP vs. Platinum
- Promotion: Bare Knuckle Fighting Championship
- Date: August 20, 2022
- Venue: Wembley Arena
- City: (England) London

BKFC 27 London: MVP vs. Platinum was a bare-knuckle fighting event held by Bare Knuckle Fighting Championship on August 20, 2022, at Wembley Arena in London, England.

=== Background ===
A middleweight bout between former Bellator MMA turned UFC fighter Michael Page and former UFC fighter Mike Perry served as the event headliner. This is the second time in BKFC history that a bout went to a sixth overtime round.

The fight between Paige VanZant and Charisa Sigala was expected to serve as the co-main event. The fight was canceled few days ahead of the event and was subsequently rescheduled to take place at BKFC 31 on October 15.

=== Results ===
BKFC 27 London: MVP vs. Platinum
Weight Class				Method	Round	Time	Notes
Middleweight 79 kg	(United States) Mike Perry	def.	(England) Michael Page	Decision (majority)	6	2:00	The first 5 rounds went to a split draw.
Welterweight 75 kg	(England) Connor Tierney	def.	(United States) Joe Elmore	Decision (unanimous)	5	2:00	49-43, 50-46, 50-45
Lightweight 70 kg	(Wales) James Lilley	def.	(England) Tyler Goodjohn	Decision (unanimous)	5	2:00	49-46, 50-44, 48-47
Heavyweight 120 kg	(England) Mick Terrill	def.	(United States) Sam Shewmaker	KO	1	1:59	
Middleweight 79 kg	(England) Jake Bostwick	def.	(England) Chris Fishgold	TKO	2	1:58	
Light Heavyweight 84 kg	(United Kingdom) Danny Christie	def.	(England) Terry Brazier	TKO	3	1:22	
Heavyweight 120 kg	(Poland) Dawid Zoltaszek	def.	(Canada) Adam Harris	KO	1	1:59	
Light Heavyweight 84 kg	(Wales) David Round	vs.	(England) Ash Griffiths	KO	2	0:40	
Featherweight 66 kg	(England) John Hick	def.	(England) Ellis Sheperd	Decision (unanimous)	5	2:00	48-47, 48-47, 50-45
Preliminary card
Heavyweight 120 kg	(Scotland) Rob Cunningham	def.	(United Kingdom) Brett May	TKO (doctor stoppage)	2	2:00	
Welterweight 75 kg	(Argentina) Franco Tenaglia	def.	(England) Chas Symonds	KO	2	1:58	
Light Heavyweight 84 kg	(England) Dan Vinni	def.	(Romania) Conan Barbaru	KO	2	0:35	

== BKFC 28 Albuquerque: Ferea vs. Starling ==
BKFC 28 Albuquerque: Ferea vs. Starling
- Promotion: Bare Knuckle Fighting Championship
- Date: August 27, 2022
- Venue: Rio Rancho Events Center
- City: (United States) Albuquerque, New Mexico

BKFC 28 Albuquerque: Ferea vs. Starling will be a bare-knuckle fighting event to be held by Bare Knuckle Fighting Championship on August 27, 2022, at the Rio Rancho Events Center in Rio Rancho, New Mexico, USA.

Bonus awards

The following fighters were awarded bonuses:

- Performance of the Night: John Dodson
- Knockout of the Night: Eric Dodson

=== Results ===
BKFC 28 Albuquerque: Ferea vs. Starling
Weight Class				Method	Round	Time	Notes
W.Flyweight 57 kg	(United States) Christine Ferea (c)	def.	(United States) Taylor Starling	TKO (retirement)	1	0:47	For the BKFC Women's Flyweight Championship
Flyweight 57 kg	(United States) John Dodson	def.	(United States) Ryan Benoit	KO	1	0:40	
Welterweight 75 kg	(United States) Brad Kelly	def.	(United States) Isaac Vallie-Flagg	Decision (unanimous)	5	2:00	50-44, 50-44, 50-44
Light Heavyweight 84 kg	(United States) Jeremy Smith	def.	(United States) Donald Sanchez	Decision (unanimous)	5	2:00	50-45, 50-45, 49-46
Middleweight 79 kg	(United States) Will Santiago	def.	(United States) Jake Young	TKO (doctor stoppage)	1	2:00	
Featherweight 66 kg	(United States) Eric Dodson	def.	(United States) Nick Villar	KO	1	0:23	
Lightweight 70 kg	(United States) Antonio Soto	def.	(United States) Joshua Morales	TKO	3	1:49	
Middleweight 79 kg	(United States) Joshua Moreno	def.	(United States) Zion Tomlinson	KO	2	1:00	
Preliminary card
Heavyweight 120 kg	(United States) Josh Watson	def.	(United States) Kyle McElroy	TKO	1	1:25	
W.Strawweight 52 kg	(United States) Jayme Hinshaw	def.	(United States) Cassie Robb	TKO	1	1:18	
Middleweight 79 kg	(United States) Jeremy Sauceda	def.	(United States) Roderick Stewart	TKO	2	1:38	

== BKFC Thailand 3: Moment of Truth ==
BKFC Thailand 3: Moment of Truth
- Promotion: Bare Knuckle Fighting Championship
- Date: September 3, 2022
- Venue: CentralWorld Live at 8floor CentralWorld
- City: Bangkok, Thailand

BKFC Thailand 3: Moment of Truth was a bare-knuckle fighting event held by Bare Knuckle Fighting Championship on September 3, 2022, in Bangkok, Thailand.

=== Background ===
The main event will feature Muay Thai legend and two-time K-1 World MAX Champion Buakaw Banchamek making his bare-knuckle debut against Turkish kickboxing champion Erkan Varol. Pongpisan Chunyong will face Surasak Sukkhamcha for the inaugural BKFC Thailand Featherweight Championship in the co-main event.

=== Results ===
BKFC Thailand 3
Weight Class				Method	Round	Time	Notes
Lightweight 70 kg	(Thailand) Buakaw Banchamek	def.	(Turkey) Erkan Varol	KO (punches)	1	1:50	
Featherweight 66 kg	(Thailand) Surasak Sukkhamcha	def.	(Thailand) Pongpisan Chunyong	Decision (majority)	6	2:00	For the inaugural BKFC Thailand Featherweight Championship. The first five rounds went to a draw.
Cruiserweight 93 kg	(Thailand) Chaloemporn Sawatsuk	def.	(United States) Dominic Ahnee	TKO (doctor stoppage)	3	0:41	
Heavyweight 120 kg	(United States) Steve Banks	def.	(Egypt) Ahmed Abdelfattah	KO (punch)	1	0:53	
Lightweight 70 kg	(Thailand) Jakkaphop Rattanamangsang	def.	(Thailand) Maseng Sornchai	KO (punches)	3	1:55	
Middleweight 79 kg	(Russia) Mike Vetrila	def.	(Brazil) Luis Paulo Terra	Decision (unanimous)	5	2:00	48-47, 49-48, 48-47
Featherweight 66 kg	(Thailand) Krisana Srisang	def.	(Thailand) Pipat Mike Chaiporn	KO (punches)	2	0:36	
W.Bantamweight 61 kg	(Thailand) Usanakorn Thawilsuhannawang	def.	(Thailand) Natsuda Yooya	KO (punches)	1	1:12	
Bantamweight 61 kg	(Thailand) Somchai Ainthida	def.	(Thailand) Suban Malopho	Decision (unanimous)	5	2:00	48-47, 49-48, 49-47
W.Flyweight 57 kg	(Australia) Tai Emery	def.	(Thailand) Rungarun Khunchai	KO (punch)	1	1:41	
Featherweight 66 kg	(Thailand) Sadudee Srimueang	def.	(Sri Lanka) Mealinda Amarasinghe	Decision (split)	5	2:00	48-45, 47-48, 48-47
Middleweight 79 kg	(Thailand) Kantapon Petsang	def.	(Thailand) Somphong Satho	KO (punch)	1	2:00	

== BKFC 29 Montana 2: Hart vs. Sigala ==
BKFC 29 Montana 2: Hart vs. Sigala
- Promotion: Bare Knuckle Fighting Championship
- Date: September 10, 2022
- Venue: Pacific Steel & Recycling Arena
- City: (United States) Great Falls, Montana

BKFC 29 Montana 2: Hart vs. Sigala was a bare-knuckle fighting event held by Bare Knuckle Fighting Championship on September 10, 2022, at the Pacific Steel & Recycling Arena in Great Falls, Montana, USA.

=== Background ===
The event featured the promotion's return to Montana.

A BKFC Strawweight Championship bout between Britain Hart and BKFC Thailand Strawweight Champion Fani Peloumpi was due to headline the event. However, Peloumpi fell out due to visa issues and was replaced by Charisa Sigala.

=== Results ===
BKFC 29 Montana 2: Hart vs. Sigala
Weight Class				Method	Round	Time	Notes
W.Strawweight 52 kg	(United States) Britain Hart	def.	(United States) Charisa Sigala	Decision (unanimous)	5	2:00	For the inaugural BKFC Strawweight Championship. 50-45, 50-45, 50-45.
Featherweight 66 kg	(United States) Kai Stewart	def.	(United States) Rusty Crowder	Decision (split)	5	2:00	47-48, 49-46, 48-47
Welterweight 75 kg	(North Macedonia) Gorjan Slaveski	def.	(United States) Dallas Davison	KO	2	1:24	
Middleweight 79 kg	(United States) Billy Wagner	vs.	(United States) Rome Lindsay	KO	2	1:48	
W.Strawweight 52 kg	(United States) Jenny Clausius	def.	(Russia) Veronika Dmitriyeva	TKO	1	0:38	
Featherweight 66 kg	(United States) Louie Lopez	def.	(United States) Dylan Schulte	KO	4	0:50	
Light Heavyweight 84 kg	(United States) Jordan Christensen	def.	(United States) Cody Beierle	KO	1	0:26	
Preliminary Card
Cruiserweight 93 kg	(United States) Leo Bercier	def.	(United States) Brian Maxwell	TKO	2	0:43	
Lightweight 70 kg	(United States) Erik Lopez	def.	(United States) Manuel Moreira	Decision (unanimous)	5	2:00	50-45, 50-45, 50-45
Featherweight 66 kg	(United States) Dakota Highpine	def.	(United States) Koda Greenwood	Decision (unanimous)	5	2:00	50-45, 50-45, 50-45

== BKFC 30 Monroe: Hunt vs. Henry ==
BKFC 30 Monroe: Hunt vs. Henry
- Promotion: Bare Knuckle Fighting Championship
- Date: October 1, 2022
- Venue: Fant Ewing Coliseum
- City: (United States) Monroe, Louisiana

BKFC 30 Monroe: Hunt vs. Henry was a bare-knuckle fighting event held by Bare Knuckle Fighting Championship on October 1, 2022, at the Fant Ewing Coliseum in Monroe, Louisiana, USA.

=== Background ===
A BKFC Cruiserweight Championship bout between BKFC Light Heavyweight Champion Lorenzo Hunt and Quentin Henry served as the event headliner.

Bonus awards

The following fighters were awarded bonuses:

- Fight of the Night: Juan Torres vs. Zach Calmus
- Knockout of the Night: Ben Rothwell

=== Results ===
BKFC 30 Monroe: Hunt vs. Henry
Weight Class				Method	Round	Time	Notes
Cruiserweight 93 kg	(United States) Lorenzo Hunt	def.	(United States) Quentin Henry	KO	3	1:36	For the vacant BKFC Cruiserweight Championship
Heavyweight 120 kg	(United States) Ben Rothwell	def.	(United States) Bobo O'Bannon	KO	1	0:19	
Middleweight 79 kg	(United States) Kaleb Harris	def.	(United States) Harris Stephenson	KO	2	1:46	
Light heavyweight 84 kg	(United States) Dennis Labruzza	def.	(United States) Avery Duke Sensley	KO	4	0:38	
Welterweight 75 kg	(United States) Brandon Shavers	def.	(United States) Aaron Sutterfield	KO	1	0:59	
Light heavyweight 84 kg	(United States) Tony Jenkins	def.	(United States) Ravon Baxter	TKO	3	1:05	
Middleweight 79 kg	(United States) Noah Cutter	def.	(United States) Blake Lacaze	KO	2	1:09	
Preliminary Card
Heavyweight 120 kg	(United States) Juan Torres	def.	(United States) Zach Calmus	Decision (split)	5	2:00	48-47, 47-48, 49-46
Heavyweight 120 kg	(United States) David Bosnick	def.	(United States) Manuel Thibodeaux	Decision (unanimous)	5	2:00	49-46, 49-45, 50-44

== BKFC 31 Denver: Richman vs. Doolittle ==
BKFC 31 Denver: Richman vs. Doolittle
- Promotion: Bare Knuckle Fighting Championship
- Date: October 15, 2022
- Venue: 1st Bank Center
- City: (United States) Broomfield, Colorado

BKFC 31 Denver: Richman vs. Doolittle was a bare-knuckle fighting event held by Bare Knuckle Fighting Championship on October 15, 2022, at the 1st Bank Center in Broomfield, Colorado, USA.

=== Background ===
Having been moved from BKFC 27, the bout between Paige VanZant and Charisa Sigala was supposed to be the headliner of this event. However, Sigala stepped up on short notice to replace Fani Peloumpi at BKFC 29, leaving VanZant without an opponent.

The event was then ultimately headlined by Mike Richman vs. Isaac Doolittle for the interim BKFC Light Heavyweight Championship.

Melvin Guillard was initially scheduled to face Evgeny Kurdanov, but he was ultimately not allowed to compete after Colorado Combative Sports Commission denied his license on the grounds of health concerns.

=== Results ===
BKFC 31 Denver: Richman vs. Doolittle
Weight Class				Method	Round	Time	Notes
Light Heavyweight 93 kg	(United States) Mike Richman	def.	(United States) Isaac Doolittle	KO	3	1:35	For the interim BKFC Light Heavyweight Championship.
Catchweight 77 kg	(United States) Jake Lindsey	def.	(United States) Brandon Girtz	TKO	2	2:00	
Catchweight 90 kg	(United States) Chris Camozzi	def.	(United States) Bubba McDaniel	KO	1	0:37	
Heavyweight 84 kg	(United States) Josh Copeland	def.	(United States) Levi Costa	KO	3	2:00	
Welterweight 75 kg	(United States) Christian Torres	def.	(United States) Cory Madden	Decision (unanimous)	5	2:00	48-45, 48-45, 50-43
Middleweight 79 kg	(North Macedonia) Gorjan Slaveski	def.	(Russia) Evgeny Kurdanov	Decision (unanimous)	5	2:00	48-46, 50-44, 48-45
Women's Bantamweight 61 kg	(United States) Khortni Kamyron	def.	(United States) Crystal Pittman	Decision (unanimous)	5	2:00	48-43, 48-43, 48-43
Welterweight 75 kg	(United States) Andrew Yates	def.	(United States) Nolan McLaughlin	KO	1	0:19	
Lightweight 70 kg	(United States) Andrew Angelcor	def.	(United States) Van Vo	KO	3	1:59	
Cruiserweight 93 kg	(United States) Keegan Vandermeer	def.	(United States) Zeb Vincent	KO	1	0:40	

== BKFC 32 Orlando: Barnett vs. Herrera ==
BKFC 32 Orlando: Barnett vs. Herrera
- Promotion: Bare Knuckle Fighting Championship
- Date: November 5, 2022
- Venue: Caribe Royale
- City: (United States) Orlando, Florida

BKFC 32 Orlando: Barnett vs. Herrera was a bare-knuckle fighting event held by Bare Knuckle Fighting Championship on November 5, 2022, at the Caribe Royale in Orlando, Florida, USA.

=== Results ===
BKFC 32 Orlando: Barnett vs. Herrera
Weight Class				Method	Round	Time	Notes
Bantamweight 61 kg	(United States) Reggie Barnett Jr. (ic)	def.	(United States) Geane Herrera	Decision (unanimous)	5	2:00	For the interim BKFC Bantamweight Championship. 50-45, 50-45, 50-45.
Middleweight 79 kg	(United States) Jared Warren	def.	(United States) Jay Jackson	KO	2	2:00	
Lightweight 70 kg	(United States) Bobby Taylor	def.	(United States) Gabriel Freyre	KO	2	1:39	
W.Lightweight 70 kg	(United States) Jessica Borga	def.	(United States) Sarah Click	KO	1	1:15	
Bantamweight 61 kg	(United States) Travis Thompson	def.	(United States) David Diaz	Decision (unanimous)	5	2:00	50-44, 50-44, 50-44
Featherweight 66 kg	(United States) JR Ridge	def.	(United States) Chancey Wilson	Decision (unanimous)	5	2:00	48-47, 50-47, 50-45
Bantamweight 61 kg	(United States) Ryan Reber	def.	(United States) Jack Grady	DQ (intentional headbutt)	2	1:56	
Cruiserweight 93 kg	(United States) Jonathan Miller	def.	(United States) Stephon Reese	KO	1	1:44	
Preliminary Card
Featherweight 66 kg	(United States) Brandon Allen	def.	(United States) Josh Marer	KO	3	1:46	
Welterweight 75 kg	(United States) Ja’far Fortt	def.	(United States) Chris Cornelius	KO	1	0:20	
Catchweight 85 kg	(United States) Tony Murphy	def.	(United States) Shan Stapp	KO	1	0:55	

== BKFC 33 Omaha: Beltran vs. Alexander ==
BKFC 33 Omaha: Beltran vs. Alexander
- Promotion: Bare Knuckle Fighting Championship
- Date: November 18, 2022
- Venue: Liberty First Arena
- City: (United States) Omaha, Nebraska

BKFC 33 Omaha: Beltran vs. Alexander was a bare-knuckle fighting event held by Bare Knuckle Fighting Championship on November 18, 2022, at the Liberty First Arena in Omaha, Nebraska, USA.

=== Results ===
BKFC 33 Omaha: Beltran vs. Alexander
Weight Class				Method	Round	Time	Notes
Cruiserweight 93 kg	(United States) Houston Alexander	def.	(United States) Joey Beltran	KO	2	0:38	
Lightweight 70 kg	(United States) Kevin Croom	def.	(United States) Sean Wilson	KO	2	1:36	
Welterweight 75 kg	(United States) Carlos Trinidad	def.	(United States) Rynell Riley	Decision (unanimous)	5	2:00	48-45, 48-45, 47-46
Middleweight 79 kg	(United States) Dakota Cochrane	def.	(United States) Eduardo Peralta	KO	5	0:35	
Catchweight 68 kg	(United States) Tommy Strydom	def.	(United States) Cody Land	KO	2	1:51	
Middleweight 79 kg	(United States) Alonzo Martinez	def.	(United States) Jordan Christensen	Decision (unanimous)	5	2:00	49-45, 49-45, 50-44
Catchweight 69 kg	(United States) Drako Rodriguez	def.	(United States) Will Shutt	KO	3	0:51	
Preliminary Card
W.Flyweight 57 kg	(United States) Sarah Shell	def.	(United States) Audra Cummings	KO	2	1:08	
Welterweight 75 kg	(United States) Brandon Meyer	def.	(United States) Shaine Moffitt	KO	1	1:03	

== BKFC Fight Night Newcastle: Terrill vs. Banks ==
BKFC Fight Night Newcastle: Terrill vs. Banks
- Promotion: Bare Knuckle Fighting Championship
- Date: November 26, 2022
- Venue: Walker Activity Dome
- City: (England) Newcastle upon Tyne

BKFC Fight Night Newcastle: Terrill vs. Banks (also known as BKFC UK 1 and BKFC Fight Night 11) was a bare-knuckle fighting event held by Bare Knuckle Fighting Championship on November 26, 2022 in Newcastle upon Tyne, England.

=== Results ===
BKFC Fight Night Newcastle: Terrill vs. Banks
Weight Class				Method	Round	Time	Notes
Heavyweight 120 kg	(England) Mick Terrill	def.	(United States) Steve Banks	TKO	2	2:00	BKFC Heavyweight title eliminator
Cruiserweight 93 kg	(England) Anthony Holmes	def.	(England) Darren Hendry	TKO	4	0:29	For the inaugural BKFC UK Cruiserweight Championship
Light heavyweight 84 kg	(England) Danny Christie	def.	(England) Darren Godfrey	TKO	1	1:07	
Welterweight 75 kg	(Sweden) Liam Wilson	def.	(England) Will Cairns	TKO	2	0:54	
Light heavyweight 84 kg	(England) John Ferguson	def.	(England) Tom Scott	Decision (unanimous)	5	2:00	49-46, 49-46, 49-46
Heavyweight 120 kg	(England) Lee Browne	def.	(England) Billy Hawthorne	TKO	2	0:35	
Light heavyweight 84 kg	(England) Nathan Owens	def.	(Wales) David Round	Decision (unanimous)	3	1:05	50-44, 49-45, 50-44
Lightweight 70 kg	(England) Lewis Keen	def.	(England) Lewy Sherriff	TKO	3	1:08	
Preliminary Card
W.Flyweight 57 kg	(England) Melanie Shah	def.	(Sweden) Mathilda Wilson	Decision (split)	5	2:00	46-49, 48-47, 48-47
Heavyweight 120 kg	(England) Agi Faulkner	def.	(England) Daniel Robson	TKO	1	1:17	

== BKFC 34 Hollywood, FL: Palomino vs. Shoaff ==
BKFC 34 Hollywood, FL: Palomino vs. Shoaff
- Promotion: Bare Knuckle Fighting Championship
- Date: December 3, 2022
- Venue: Seminole Hard Rock Hotel & Casino
- City: (United States) Hollywood, Florida

BKFC 34 Hollywood, FL: Palomino vs. Shoaff was a bare-knuckle fighting event held by Bare Knuckle Fighting Championship at the Seminole Hard Rock Hotel & Casino on December 3, 2022 in Hollywood, Florida, USA.

Background

The main event saw current BKFC middleweight champion Luis Palomino defending his belt against Tom Shoaff. The co-main event featured Francesco Ricchi up against David Mundell for the vacant BKFC middleweight title.

=== Results ===
BKFC 34 Hollywood, FL: Palomino vs. Shoaff
Weight Class				Method	Round	Time	Notes
Lightweight 70 kg	(Peru) Luis Palomino (c)	def.	(United States) Tom Shoaff	TKO (doctor stoppage)	4	0:01	For the BKFC Lightweight Championship
Middleweight 79 kg	(United States) David Mundell	def.	(Italy) Francesco Ricchi (ic)	KO	3	1:48	For the vacant BKFC Middleweight Championship
Featherweight 66 kg	(United States) Louie Lopez	def.	(United States) Howard Davis	TKO (doctor stoppage)	1	2:00	
Middleweight 79 kg	(United States) Blake Davis	def.	(United States) William Dunkle	KO	1	1:43	
W.Flyweight 57 kg	(United States) Christine Vicens	def.	(United States) Jocelyn Jones-Lybarger	Decision (unanimous)	5	2:00	50-45, 50-45, 50-45
Lightweight 70 kg	(United States) Bryan Duran	def.	(Barbados) Kobe Bowen	KO	1	0:15	
Catchweight 77 kg	(United States) Rene Rodriguez	def.	(United States) Jake Young	KO	1	1:57	
Preliminary Card
Bantamweight 61 kg	(United States) Guillermo Perez	def.	(United States) Rob Fuller	KO	1	1:54	
Lightweight 70 kg	(United States) Joshuah Alvarez	def.	(United States) Glendel Futrell	Decision (unanimous)	5	2:00	48-47, 48-47, 49-46
Featherweight 66 kg	(Cuba) Alberto Blas	def.	(United States) Jeremiah Potts	KO	1	0:54	
Light Heavyweight 84 kg	(South Africa) Jeremy Smith	def.	(Nicaragua) Leo Valdivia	KO	3	1:52	
Bantamweight 61 kg	(United States) Matt Russo	def.	(United States) Jakobi Lowry	TKO (doctor stoppage)	1	2:00	
Featherweight 66 kg	(Cuba) Freddy Masabo	def.	(United States) Shawn Moffett	TKO (knee injury)	1	0:27	

== BKFC Asia 4: The Big Bash ==
BKFC Asia 4: The Big Bash
- Promotion: Bare Knuckle Fighting Championship
- Date: December 10, 2022
- Venue: SpacePlus Bangkok RCA
- City: Bangkok, Thailand

BKFC Asia 4: The Big Bash was a bare-knuckle fighting event held by Bare Knuckle Fighting Championship at SpacePlus Bangkok RCA on December 10, 2022 in Bangkok, Thailand.

=== Results ===
BKFC Asia 4
Weight Class				Method	Round	Time	Notes
Lightweight 70 kg	(Philippines) Rolando Dy	def.	(Thailand) Apisit Sangmuang	KO	1	0:42	
W.Flyweight 57 kg	(Thailand) Po Denman	def.	(Australia) Tai Emery	Decision (unanimous)	5	2:00	49-47, 48-47, 48-47
Welterweight 75 kg	(Brazil) Gilbert Patrocinio	def.	(Thailand) Channarong Injampa	KO	2	1:23	
Featherweight 66 kg	(Thailand) Tetee Denman	def.	(Myanmar) Saw Htoo Aung	Decision (unanimous)	5	2:00	49-45, 48-46, 49-46
Lightweight 70 kg	(Sweden) Gustaf Cerdermalm	def.	(Guam) Alex Castro	KO	4	1:50	
Featherweight 66 kg	(Algeria) Sohanne Bengana	def.	(Thailand) Siharath Srisang	TKO (shoulder injury)	2	0:47	
Featherweight 66 kg	(Philippines) Joemil Miado	def.	(Iran) Poorya Mokhtari	KO	1	1:30	
Featherweight 66 kg	(Thailand) Sarun Srioumboo	def.	(England) Victor Booty	KO	2	1:10	
Bantamweight 61 kg	(Cambodia) Chor Pov	def.	(India) Patho Ghosh	KO	2	1:18	
Bantamweight 61 kg	(Cambodia) Ouch Thearith	def.	(India) Anubhav Kumar Verma	KO	3	0:56	

== See also ==
- Bare Knuckle Fighting Championship
