= 2020 in Bare Knuckle Fighting Championship =

Information
- First date: February 15, 2020
- Last date: December 5, 2020

Events
- Total events: 6

Fights
- Total fights: 56
- Title fights: 3

Chronology
2019 in Bare Knuckle Fighting Championship	2020 in Bare Knuckle Fighting Championship	2021 in Bare Knuckle Fighting Championship

The year 2020 was the third year in the history of the Bare Knuckle Fighting Championship, a bare-knuckle fighting promotion based in Philadelphia.

== Background ==
2020 season started with Bare Knuckle Fighting Championship 10: Lombard vs. Riggs. BKFC is available on PPV all over the world and on FITE TV.

== Super Welterweight Championship Tournament Bracket ==
Semi-Finals; BKFC 10
(Peru) Luis Palomino	UD
(Puerto Rico) Elvin Brito	5R.
(United States) Jim Alers	MD
(United States) Kaleb Harris	5R.

Final; BKFC 11
(Peru) Luis Palomino	KO
(United States) Isaac Vallie-Flagg *	1R.

- Alers withdrew from the final and was replaced by Vallie-Flagg.

== List of events ==
#	Event	Date	Venue	Location
1	BKFC 10: Lombard vs. Mundell	February 15, 2020	Broward County Convention Center	(United States) Fort Lauderdale, Florida
2	BKFC 11: Vallie-Flagg vs. Palomino	July 24, 2020	Lafayette County Multipurpose Arena	(United States) Oxford, Mississippi, USA
3	BKFC 12: Alves vs. Lane	September 11, 2020	Ocean Center	(United States) Daytona Beach, Florida, USA
4	BKFC 13: Beltran vs. Stamps	October 10, 2020	Tony's Pizza Events Center	(United States) Salina, Kansas, USA
5	BKFC 14: Palomino vs. Alers	November 13, 2020	InterContinental Miami	(United States) Miami, Florida, USA
6	BKFC 15: O'Bannon vs. Shewmaker	December 11, 2020	Mississippi Coast Coliseum	(United States) Biloxi, Mississippi, USA

== BKFC 10: Lombard vs. Mundell ==
BKFC 10: Lombard vs. Mundell
- Promotion: Bare Knuckle Fighting Championship
- Date: February 15, 2020
- Venue: Broward County Convention Center
- City: (United States) Fort Lauderdale, USA

BKFC 10: Lombard vs. Mundell was a bare-knuckle fighting event held by Bare Knuckle Fighting Championship on February 15, 2020, at the Broward County Convention Center in Fort Lauderdale, USA.

=== Background ===
Joe Riggs was scheduled to face Héctor Lombard in the main event, however Riggs suffered an injury in training and withdrew from the fight. David Mundell served as Riggs replacement, taking the short notice fight against Lombard.

This event also featured the first two quarter-final bouts of the Tournament to crown the first BKFC Super welterweight Championship.

Bonus awards

The following fighters were awarded bonuses:

- Fight of the Night: Jim Alers vs. Kaleb Harris

=== Results ===
BKFC 10: Lombard vs. Mundell
Weight Class				Method	Round	Time	Notes
Cruiserweight 93 kg	(Cuba) Héctor Lombard	def.	(United States) David Mundell	Decision (unanimous)	5	2:00	49-46, 48–47, 48–47
Super Welterweight 70 kg	(United States) Jim Alers	def.	(United States) Kaleb Harris	Decision (majority)	5	2:00	Super Welterweight Tournament Semi-Finals. 50–44, 48–46, 47-47.
Super Welterweight 70 kg	(Peru) Luis Palomino	def.	(Puerto Rico) Elvin Brito	Decision (unanimous)	5	2:00	Super Welterweight Tournament Semi-Finals. 50–45, 49–46, 50–45.
Cruiserweight 93 kg	(United States) Ulysses Diaz	def.	(United States) Brian Maxwell	TKO (punches)	1	1:13	
Lightweight 62.5 kg	(United States) Dat Nguyen	def.	(Puerto Rico) Abdiel Velazquez	KO (punches)	1	1:51	
Cruiserweight 93 kg	(Cuba) Gustavo Trujillo	def.	(United States) Lorenzo Hunt	TKO (punches)	1	1:01	
Light Heavyweight 84 kg	(United States) Francesco Ricchi	def.	(United States) Frederick Pierce	TKO (punches)	1	1:38	
Lightweight 62.5 kg	(United States) Travis Thompson	def.	(United States) Joshua Boudreaux	TKO (punches)	2	0:15	
Preliminary Card
Lightweight 62.5 kg	(United States) Reggie Barnett Jr.	def.	(United States) Matt Murphy	TKO (punches)	2	1:46	

== BKFC 11: Vallie-Flagg vs. Palomino ==
BKFC 11: Vallie-Flagg vs. Palomino
- Promotion: Bare Knuckle Fighting Championship
- Date: July 24, 2020
- Venue: Lafayette County Multipurpose Arena
- City: (United States) Oxford, Mississippi, USA

BKFC 11: Vallie-Flagg vs. Palomino was a bare-knuckle fighting event held by Bare Knuckle Fighting Championship on July 24, 2020, at the Lafayette County Multipurpose Arena in Oxford, Mississippi, USA.

=== Background ===
The event was initially scheduled to be held on March 14, 2020, at the Intrust Bank Arena in Wichita, USA. However, the event was postponed until June 20, 2020, due to the COVID-19 pandemic. It was then pushed back further to July 24, 2020, and moved to the Lafayette County Arena in Oxford, Mississippi

=== Results ===
BKFC 11: Vallie-Flagg vs. Palomino
Weight Class				Method	Round	Time	Notes
Super Welterweight 70 kg	(Peru) Luis Palomino	def.	(United States) Isaac Vallie-Flagg	KO (punches)	1	0:45	Super Welterweight Tournament Final
Heavyweight 120 kg	(United States) Dillon Cleckler	def.	(United States) Frank Tate	KO (punches)	3	0:59	
Middleweight 75 kg	(Puerto Rico) Elvin Brito	def.	(United States) Kaleb Harris	Decision (split)	5	2:00	45-50, 48–47, 49–46
Heavyweight 120 kg	(United States) Codie Shuffield	def.	(United States) Herbert Morgan	TKO (retirement)	2	1:30	
Super Welterweight 70 kg	(United States) Bobby Taylor	def.	(United States) Louis Hernandez	Decision (split)	5	2:00	48-47, 49–46, 48–47
Heavyweight 120 kg	(United States) Chris Sarro	def.	(United States) Victor Jones	KO (punches)	1	1:50	
Super Middleweight 77 kg	(United States) Joe Elmore	def.	(United States) Will Chope	TKO (punches)	1	0:52	
Cruiserweight 93 kg	(United States) Tee Cummins	def.	(United States) John McAllister	TKO (punches)	2	0:42	

== BKFC 12: Alves vs. Lane ==
BKFC 12: Alves vs. Lane
- Promotion: Bare Knuckle Fighting Championship
- Date: September 11, 2020
- Venue: Ocean Center
- City: (United States) Daytona Beach, Florida

BKFC 12: Alves vs. Lane was a bare-knuckle fighting event held by Bare Knuckle Fighting Championship on September 11, 2020, at the Ocean Center in Daytona Beach, Florida.

=== Background ===
The event was initially scheduled to be held on April 11, 2020, at the Boutwell Memorial Auditorium in Birmingham, USA. However, the event was postponed indefinitely due to the COVID-19 pandemic. It was later rescheduled to take place on August 21, 2020, at the Intrust Bank Arena in Wichita, Kansas. However, it was then pushed back further to September 11, 2020, and moved to the Ocean Center convention center in Daytona Beach, Florida, USA.

Thiago Alves was originally scheduled to face Phil Baroni in the main event. However, on September 3, it was announced Baroni would be replaced by The Ultimate Fighter competitor Julian Lane.

Bonus awards

The following fighters were awarded bonuses:

- Fight of the Night: Joe Elmore vs. Tom Shoaff
- Knockout of the Night: Lorenzo Hunt

=== Results ===
BKFC 12: Alves vs. Lane
Weight Class				Method	Round	Time	Notes
Light Heavyweight 84 kg	(Brazil) Thiago Alves	def.	(United States) Julian Lane	Decision (split)	5	2:00	48-47, 47–48, 48–47
Cruiserweight 93 kg	(Cuba) Hector Lombard	def.	(United States) Kendall Grove	TKO (punch)	1	1:50	
Lightweight 62.5 kg	(United States) Reggie Barnett Jr.	def.	(Puerto Rico) Abdiel Velazquez	Decision (unanimous)	5	2:00	50-43, 50–43, 50–43
W.Featherweight 57 kg	(United States) Christine Ferea	def.	(United States) Callie Cutler	TKO (referee stoppage)	2	1:27	
Cruiserweight 93 kg	(United States) Lorenzo Hunt	def.	(United States) Erick Lozano	KO (punch)	3	1:58	
Light Heavyweight 84 kg	(United States) Josh Dyer	def.	(United States) Jarred Warren	TKO (referee stoppage)	3	1:16	
Lightweight 62.5 kg	(United States) Joe Elmore	def.	(United States) Tom Shoaff	Decision (unanimous)	5	2:00	49-42, 49–42, 49–43
Lightweight 62.5 kg	(United States) Jarod Grant	def.	(United States) Joshua Bourdreaux	TKO (referee stoppage)	2	1:23	
Preliminary Card
Light Heavyweight 84 kg	(United States) Kenmon Evans	def.	(United States) Robert Washington	KO (punches)	1	1:39	
Welterweight 68 kg	(United States) Rusty Crowder	def.	(United States) Jacob Brunell	Decision (unanimous)	5	2:00	47-45, 47–45, 48–44

== BKFC 13: Beltran vs. Stamps ==
BKFC 13: Beltran vs. Stamps
- Promotion: Bare Knuckle Fighting Championship
- Date: October 10, 2020
- Venue: Tony's Pizza Events Center
- City: (United States) Salina, Kansas, USA

BKFC 13: Beltran vs. Stamps was a bare-knuckle fighting event held by Bare Knuckle Fighting Championship on October 10, 2020, at the Tony's Pizza Events Center in Salina, Kansas, USA.

=== Background ===
The event was headlined by Joey Beltran defending his BKFC Heavyweight Championship against Marcel Stamps.

=== Results ===
BKFC 13: Beltran vs. Stamps
Weight Class				Method	Round	Time	Notes
Heavyweight 120 kg	(United States) Joey Beltran (c)	def.	(United States) Marcel Stamps	TKO (punch)	4	1:55	For the BKFC Heavyweight Championship
Featherweight 57 kg	(United States) Nico Hernandez	def.	(United States) Chancy Wilson	TKO (doctor stoppage)	4	2:00	Stopped between rounds after Wilson vomited
Super Middleweight 80 kg	(United States) David Rickels	def.	(United States) Clifford Wright	Decision (unanimous)	5	2:00	50-45, 50–45, 50–43
Heavyweight 120 kg	(United States) Bill Dieckhoff	def.	(United States) Austin Levine	KO (punch)	1	1:54	
Light Heavyweight 84 kg	(United States) Isaac Doolittle	def.	(United States) Brandon Johnson	Decision (majority)	5	2:00	48-46, 47-47, 48–46
Super Middleweight 80 kg	(United States) Antonio Hernandez	def.	(United States) Jack Freriks	Decision (unanimous)	5	2:00	49-46, 49–46, 48–47
Welterweight 68 kg	(United States) LJ Hermreck	def.	(United States) Rowdy Akers	KO (punch)	1	0:51	
Middleweight 75 kg	(United States) Fred Pierce	def.	(United States) John Hollis	KO (punches)	1	1:54	
Preliminary Card
Featherweight 57 kg	(United States) Kendrick Latchman	def.	(United States) Miles McDonald	TKO (punch to the body)	2	1:41	

== BKFC 14: Palomino vs. Alers ==
BKFC 14: Palomino vs. Alers
- Promotion: Bare Knuckle Fighting Championship
- Date: November 13, 2020
- Venue: InterContinental Miami
- City: (United States) Miami, Florida

BKFC 14: Palomino vs. Alers was a bare-knuckle fighting event held by Bare Knuckle Fighting Championship on November 13, 2020, at the InterContinental Miami in Miami, Florida.

=== Background ===
The event was expected to be headlined by recent signee Paige VanZant. However, the fight never materialized.

Instead, the card was headlined by Luis Palomino defending the BKFC Super Welterweight Championship against Jim Alers.

=== Results ===
BKFC 14: Palomino vs. Alers
Weight Class				Method	Round	Time	Notes
Super Welterweight 70 kg	(Peru) Luis Palomino (c)	def.	(United States) Jim Alers	KO (punches)	1	0:44	For the BKFC Super Welterweight Championship
Light Heavyweight 84 kg	(England) Jake Bostwick	def.	(United States) Tyler Vogel	Ext.R Decision (unanimous)	6	2:00	No scores announced.
Women's Featherweight 57 kg	(United States) Britain Hart	def.	(United States) Randine Eckholm	TKO (punches)	4	1:21	
Super Middleweight 80 kg	(Italy) Francesco Ricchi	def.	(United States) Noah Cutter	TKO (punches)	3	0:31	
Catchweight 88.5 kg	(Cuba) Uly Diaz	def.	(United States) Donelei Benedetto	KO (punch)	1	0:03	Fastest knockout in BKFC history.
Lightweight 62.5 kg	(United States) Jarod Grant	def.	(United States) Christopher Johnson	TKO (corner stoppage)	3	0:24	
Super Welterweight 70 kg	(United States) Eddie Hoch	def.	(United States) Jeff Chiffens	KO (punches)	2	1:01	
Cruiserweight 93 kg	(United States) Lorenzo Hunt	def.	(United States) Davian Green	TKO (referee stoppage)	2	0:49	
Preliminary Card
Middleweight 75 kg	(Dominican Republic) Alan Arzeno	def.	(United States) Fred Pierce	TKO (leg injury)	1	1:31	
Super Middleweight 80 kg	(United States) Kenmon Evans	def.	(United States) Sedric Johnson	KO (punches)	1	1:40	

== BKFC 15: O'Bannon vs. Shewmaker ==
BKFC 15: O'Bannon vs. Shewmaker
- Promotion: Bare Knuckle Fighting Championship
- Date: December 11, 2020
- Venue: Mississippi Coast Coliseum
- City: (United States) Biloxi, Mississippi, USA

'BKFC 15: O'Bannon vs. Shewmaker' was a bare-knuckle boxing event held by Bare Knuckle Fighting Championship on December 11, 2020, at the Mississippi Coast Coliseum in Biloxi, Mississippi, USA.

=== Background ===
The promotion was targeting a Heavyweight bout between MMA veterant Mark Godbeer and Sam Shewmaker to headline the event. However, it was announced on December 6 that Godbeer was pulled from the contest after he tested positive for COVID-19. Undefeated heavyweight Bobo O'Bannon stepped up on a few days' notice to fight Shewmaker in the main-event.

=== Results ===
BKFC 15: O'Bannon vs. Shewmaker
Weight Class				Method	Round	Time	Notes
Heavyweight 120 kg	(United States) Sam Shewmaker	def.	(United States) Bobo O'Bannon	TKO (punches)	1	2:00	BKFC Heavyweight Championship title eliminator.
Welterweight 68 kg	(England) Tyler Goodjohn	def.	(United States) Charles Bennett	Decision (unanimous)	5	2:00	48-46, 48–46, 49–45
Light Heavyweight 84 kg	(United States) Dakota Cochrane	def.	(United States) Tyler Vogel	TKO (doctor stoppage)	5	1:21	
Heavyweight 120 kg	(United States) Josh Burns	def.	(United States) Chris Sarro	KO (punches)	2	0:18	
Women's Featherweight 57 kg	(United States) Jenny Clausius	def.	(United States) Sheena Brandenburg	TKO (doctor stoppage)	2	0:43	
Middleweight 75 kg	(United States) Brad Kelly	def.	(United States) Kaine Thomlinson Sr.	TKO (referee stoppage)	1	2:00	
Light Heavyweight 84 kg	(United States) Harris Stephenson	def.	(United States) Christopher Lavant	KO (punches)	1	1:19	
Cruiserweight 93 kg	(United States) Quentin Henry	def.	(United States) Jason Fann	KO (punch)	1	0:25	
Preliminary Card
Heavyweight 120 kg	(United States) Lewis Rumsey	def.	(United States) Adrian Miles	TKO (punch)	1	0:20	
Welterweight 68 kg	(United States) Adam Pellerano	def.	(United States) Rusty Crowder	Decision (unanimous)	5	2:00	48-46, 50–46, 50–44

== See also ==
- Bare Knuckle Fighting Championship
