= Chance Rencountre =

American professional mixed martial artist

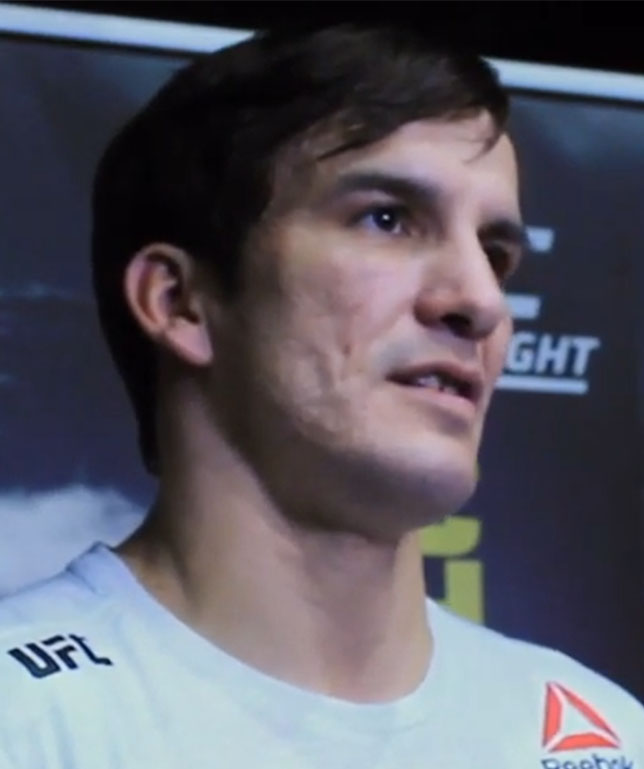
- Chance Rencountre at UFC Fight Night 143 in New York, United States
- Born: Chance Eugene Duke Rencountre; December 31, 1986 (age 39); Pawhuska, Oklahoma, United States
- Other names: Black Eagle
- Nationality: American, Osage Nation
- Height: 6 ft 2 in (1.88 m)
- Weight: 170 lb (77 kg; 12 st)
- Division: Welterweight
- Reach: 74.5 in (189 cm)
- Fighting out of: Pawhuska, Oklahoma, United States
- Team: Alliance MMA
- Years active: 2013–present

Mixed martial arts record
- Total: 21
- Wins: 16
- By knockout: 6
- By submission: 5
- By decision: 5
- Losses: 5
- By knockout: 2
- By decision: 3

Other information
- Mixed martial arts record from Sherdog

Chance Eugene Duke Rencountre (born December 31, 1986) is an American professional mixed martial artist who competes in the Welterweight division. A professional since 2012, he has also competed for the Ultimate Fighting Championship (UFC), Bellator MMA, and Titan FC.

== Background ==
Rencountre was born to a single mother in Pawhuska, Oklahoma, which is part of the reservation of the Osage Nation. His mother had to work three jobs to support her son growing up. As homage to his heritage Rencountre carries the flag of the Osage nation when entering the ring. His sister Alexis Rencountre is the Osage Nation's elections supervisor. He is the first member of the Osage tribe to compete in the UFC.

== Mixed martial arts career ==
=== Bellator MMA ===
After amassing a record of 8 wins and 1 loss, Rencountre signed with Bellator MMA. He made his debut at Bellator 151, losing to Justin Patterson by split decision. In his second fight for the promotion, he faced Jake Lindsey at Bellator 171 and won the fight by split decision.

=== Ultimate Fighting Championship ===
Rencountre made his UFC debut on June 1, 2018, when he came in as a late substitute for Niko Price to face Belal Muhammad at UFC Fight Night: Rivera vs. Moraes. he lost the fight by unanimous decision.

Rencountre was initially supposed to fight Randy Brown at UFC Fight Night: Cejudo vs. Dillashaw, but Brown pulled out in the week leading up to the event. Dwight Grant was soon announced as his replacement, but it was later reported that he was unable to be cleared to fight due to an "eye issue". Promotional newcomer Kyle Stewart was then announced as Rencountre's new opponent. Rencountre won the fight via a rear-naked choke submission in the first round.

Rencountre faced Ismail Naurdiev on July 6, 2019, at UFC 239. He won the fight via unanimous decision.

Rencountre faced Lyman Good on November 2, 2019 at UFC 244. He lost the fight via TKO in the third round.

On March 19, 2020, it was reported that Rencountre was no longer in the UFC roster. Rencountre elaborated the situation in an interview, saying he fought his contract out and the organization decided not to renew the contract.

=== Post-UFC career ===
Rencountre was scheduled to face Jake Lindsey in a rematch at FAC 8 on May 7, 2021. However, Lindsey withdrew from the bout and was replaced by Cliff Wright. Rencountre won the bout via rear-naked choke at the end of the first round.

Rencountre was rescheduled against Jake Lindsey at FAC 11 on December 10, 2021. He won the bout via rear-nake choke in the second round.

=== Return to Bellator MMA ===
As a late replacement for Mukhamed Berkhamov, Rencountre faced Andrey Koreshkov on February 19, 2022 at Bellator 274. He lost the bout via spinning back kick to the liver 38 seconds into the bout which broke 5 of his ribs and punctured his lung.

== Championships and accomplishments ==
- C3 Fights
  - C3 Fights Welterweight Championship (one time; former)
- Dynasty Combat Sports
  - DCS Welterweight Championship (one time; former)

== Mixed martial arts record ==
Professional record breakdown
| 21 matches | 16 wins | 5 losses |
| By knockout | 6 | 2 |
| By submission | 5 | 0 |
| By decision | 5 | 3 |

| Res. | Record | Opponent | Method | Event | Date | Round | Time | Location | Notes |
|---|---|---|---|---|---|---|---|---|---|
| Loss | 16–5 | Andrey Koreshkov | TKO (spinning body kick and punches) | Bellator 274 | February 19, 2022 | 1 | 0:38 | Uncasville, Connecticut, United States | |
| Win | 16–4 | Jake Lindsey | Submission (rear-naked choke) | FAC 11 | December 10, 2021 | 2 | 0:44 | Independence, Missouri, United States | |
| Win | 15–4 | Cliff Wright | Submission (rear-naked choke) | FAC 8 | May 7, 2021 | 1 | 4:58 | Kansas City, Missouri, United States | |
| Loss | 14–4 | Lyman Good | TKO (punches) | UFC 244 | November 2, 2019 | 3 | 2:03 | New York City, New York, United States | |
| Win | 14–3 | Ismail Naurdiev | Decision (unanimous) | UFC 239 | July 6, 2019 | 3 | 5:00 | Las Vegas, Nevada, United States | |
| Win | 13–3 | Kyle Stewart | Submission (rear-naked choke) | UFC Fight Night: Cejudo vs. Dillashaw | January 19, 2019 | 1 | 2:25 | Brooklyn, New York, United States | |
| Loss | 12–3 | Belal Muhammad | Decision (unanimous) | UFC Fight Night: Rivera vs. Moraes | June 1, 2018 | 3 | 5:00 | Utica, New York, United States | |
| Win | 12–2 | Chris Harris | Submission (rear-naked choke) | C3 Fights: Border Wars | February 10, 2018 | 1 | 2:42 | Newkirk, Oklahoma, United States | Won the C3 Fights Welterweight Championship. |
| Win | 11–2 | Justin Patterson | Submission (brabo choke) | Bellator 184 | October 6, 2017 | 1 | 2:58 | Thackerville, Oklahoma, United States | |
| Win | 10–2 | Brian Monaghan | TKO (punches) | DCS 33: Spring Brawl 2017 | April 1, 2017 | 3 | 3:02 | Lincoln, Nebraska, United States | Won the DCS Welterweight Championship. |
| Win | 9–2 | Jake Lindsey | Decision (split) | Bellator 171 | January 27, 2017 | 3 | 5:00 | Mulvane, Kansas, United States | |
| Loss | 8–2 | Justin Patterson | Decision (split) | Bellator 151 | March 4, 2016 | 3 | 5:00 | Thackerville, Oklahoma, United States | |
| Win | 8–1 | Joe Heiland | Decision (unanimous) | C3 Fights: Beltran vs. Stafford | December 5, 2015 | 3 | 5:00 | Newkirk, Oklahoma, United States | |
| loss | 7–1 | James Nakashima | Decision (unanimous) | RFA 30: Smith vs. Jardine | September 14, 2015 | 3 | 5:00 | Lincoln, Nebraska, United States | |
| Win | 7–0 | Andrew Parker | TKO (punches) | Legend Fights | July 24, 2015 | 1 | 3:09 | Shawnee, Oklahoma, United States | |
| Win | 6–0 | Mike Jackson | Decision (unanimous) | C3 Fights: Rencountre vs. Jackson | January 24, 2015 | 3 | 5:00 | Newkirk, Oklahoma, United States | |
| Win | 5–0 | Zach Kelly | TKO (punches) | Oklahoma Fighting Championship 3 | November 22, 2014 | 2 | 0:42 | Concho, Oklahoma, United States | |
| Win | 4–0 | Jose Brewer | KO (punch) | C3 Fights: Border Wars 2014 | February 8, 2014 | 1 | 0:28 | Newkirk, Oklahoma, United States | |
| Win | 3–0 | Rashid Abdullah | KO (punch) | C3 Fights: Fall Brawl 2013 | October 12, 2013 | 1 | 2:06 | Newkirk, Oklahoma, United States | |
| Win | 2–0 | Jason Witt | TKO (punches) | Titan FC 26 | August 30, 2013 | 2 | 0:56 | Kansas City, Missouri, United States | |
| Win | 1–0 | Wesley Sullivan | Decision (unanimous) | Rhino Fighting Championships 6 | March 8, 2013 | 3 | 5:00 | Spring Hill, Tennessee, United States | |

== See also ==
- List of male mixed martial artists
