= Jason Witt =

American mixed martial arts fighter

- Born: November 7, 1986 (age 39); Kansas City, Missouri, U.S.
- Other names: The Vanilla Gorilla
- Height: 5 ft 10 in (1.78 m)
- Weight: 180 lb (82 kg; 12 st 12 lb)
- Division: Welterweight
- Reach: 70 in (178 cm)
- Stance: Orthodox
- Fighting out of: Kansas City, Missouri
- Team: Submission Inc. (formerly); HD MMA (formerly); Glory MMA and Fitness (2014–present)
- Rank: Black belt in Brazilian Jiu-Jitsu under Jason Bircher
- Years active: 2013–2022

Mixed martial arts record
- Total: 28
- Wins: 19
- By knockout: 3
- By submission: 8
- By decision: 7
- By disqualification: 1
- Losses: 9
- By knockout: 7
- By submission: 2

Other information
- Mixed martial arts record from Sherdog

Jason Witt (born November 7, 1986) is a retired American mixed martial artist who last competed in the Welterweight division of the Ultimate Fighting Championship.

== Background ==
Witt started training around 2009 with his uncle, who used to be a professional kickboxer.

== Mixed martial arts career ==
=== Early career ===
Witt fought locally in the Missouri regionals, debuting on April 3, 2009. His debut in the amateur ranks was a loss against Tyler Johnson. He turned professional in March 2013 and won his first match on April 26 in Shamrock Fighting Championships, defeating Nick Felix. Witt would then compete in such organizations as Shamrock FC, Titan FC, and Bellator MMA, and Legacy Fighting Alliance.

=== Ultimate Fighting Championship ===
Witt made his UFC debut as a welterweight on June 27, 2020 at UFC Fight Night: Poirier vs Hooker, replacing Ramiz Brahimaj as the opponent of Takashi Sato. He lost the fight via TKO in round one.

Witt faced Cole Williams on October 31, 2020 at UFC Fight Night: Hall vs. Silva. At the weigh-ins, Cole Williams missed weight, weighing in at 175.5 pounds, four and a half pounds over the welterweight non-title fight limit. The bout proceeded at catchweight and Williams was fined a percentage of his individual purse, Jason Witt. Witt dominated the bout and secured a second round submission win.

Witt faced Matthew Semelsberger on March 13, 2021 at UFC Fight Night: Edwards vs. Muhammad. He lost the fight via knockout in round one.

As the last bout of his rookie contract, Witt faced Bryan Barberena on July 31, 2021 at UFC on ESPN 28. He won the fight via majority decision. This fight earned him the Fight of the Night award.

As the first bout of his new, four-fight contract Witt faced Philip Rowe on February 5, 2022 at UFC Fight Night: Hermansson vs. Strickland. He lost the fight via technical knockout in round two.

Witt was scheduled to face Josh Quinlan on August 6, 2022 at UFC on ESPN: Santos vs. Hill. but was pushed back one week to UFC on ESPN 41 due to Josh Quinlan being pulled from the event for an atypical drug finding; long-term metabolite (or M3 metabolite) of the steroid dehydrochloromethyltestosterone (DHCMT) in a urine sample. Witt lost the fight via knockout in round one.

On October 30, 2022, Witt announced his retirement from MMA.

== Championships and achievements ==
- Ultimate Fighting Championship
  - Fight of the Night (One time) vs. Bryan Barberena
- Kansas City Fighting Alliance
  - KC Fighting Alliance Welterweight Championship (One time)
    - Four successful title defenses

== Mixed martial arts record ==
Professional record breakdown
28 matches	19 wins	9 losses
By knockout	3	7
By submission	8	2
By decision	7	0
By disqualification	1	0

Res.	Record	Opponent	Method	Event	Date	Round	Time	Location	Notes
Loss	19–9	Josh Quinlan	KO (punch)	UFC on ESPN: Vera vs. Cruz	August 13, 2022	1	2:09	San Diego, California, United States	Catchweight (180 lb) bout.
Loss	19–8	Philip Rowe	TKO (punches)	UFC Fight Night: Hermansson vs. Strickland	February 5, 2022	2	2:15	Las Vegas, Nevada, United States	
Win	19–7	Bryan Barberena	Decision (majority)	UFC on ESPN: Hall vs. Strickland	July 31, 2021	3	5:00	Las Vegas, Nevada, United States	Fight of the Night.
Loss	18–7	Matthew Semelsberger	KO (punch)	UFC Fight Night: Edwards vs. Muhammad	March 13, 2021	1	0:16	Las Vegas, Nevada, United States	
Win	18–6	Cole Williams	Submission (arm-triangle choke)	UFC Fight Night: Hall vs. Silva	October 31, 2020	2	2:09	Las Vegas, Nevada, United States	Catchweight (175.5 lb) bout; Williams missed weight.
Loss	17–6	Takashi Sato	TKO (punches)	UFC on ESPN: Poirier vs. Hooker	June 27, 2020	1	0:48	Las Vegas, Nevada, United States	
Win	17–5	Zak Bucia	Decision (unanimous)	Fighting Alliance Championship 2	February 22, 2020	3	5:00	Independence, Missouri, United States	
Win	16–5	Roberto Neves	Decision (unanimous)	Final Fight Championship 40	September 5, 2019	3	5:00	Las Vegas, Nevada, United States	
Win	15–5	Cliff Wright	Decision (unanimous)	Kansas City Fighting Alliance 34	July 27, 2019	3	5:00	Independence, Missouri, United States	Defended the KC Fighting Alliance Welterweight Championship.
Win	14–5	Ashkan Morvari	Submission (rear-naked choke)	LFA 50	September 21, 2018	3	1:01	Prior Lake, Minnesota, United States	Catchweight (165 lb) bout.
Loss	13–5	Hugh Pulley	TKO (punches)	Stronger Men's Conference 2018	April 13, 2018	2	1:44	Springfield, Missouri, United States	
Win	13–4	Mark Lemminger	TKO (punches)	Chosen Few FC 13	January 27, 2018	3	1:38	Madison, Wisconsin, United States	Catchweight (175 lb) bout.
Win	12–4	Ty Freeman	Decision (unanimous)	LFA 29	December 15, 2017	3	5:00	Prior Lake, Minnesota, United States	
Win	11–4	Jake Lindsey	Decision (unanimous)	Kansas City Fighting Alliance 25	September 30, 2017	3	5:00	Independence, Missouri, United States	Defended the KC Fighting Alliance Welterweight Championship.
Win	10–4	Kenny Licea	KO (punch)	Carden Combat Sports 2	June 24, 2017	2	0:09	Kansas City, Missouri, United States	
Win	9–4	Wade Johnson	Submission (rear-naked choke)	Pyramid Fights 2	May 13, 2017	1	2:37	Searcy, Arkansas, United States	
Loss	8–4	Justin Patterson	TKO (punches)	Bellator 174	March 3, 2017	3	0:13	Thackerville, Oklahoma, United States	Catchweight (175 lb) bout.
Win	8–3	Craig Eckelberg	Submission (rear-naked choke)	Kansas City Fighting Alliance 21	December 9, 2016	1	4:31	Independence, Missouri, United States	Defended the KC Fighting Alliance Welterweight Championship.
Loss	7–3	Dakota Cochrane	Submission (rear-naked choke)	Victory FC 52	July 16, 2016	2	3:17	Omaha, Nebraska, United States	
Win	7–2	Isaac Vallie-Flagg	DQ (illegal knee)	Titan FC 34	July 18, 2015	3	1:54	Kansas City, Missouri, United States	Catchweight (160 lb) bout.
Win	6–2	Ryan Dickson	TKO (punches)	GWFC 2	May 30, 2015	1	1:00	Burlington, Ontario, Canada	Catchweight (163 lb) bout.
Win	5–2	Josh Tulley	Decision (unanimous)	Kansas City Fighting Alliance 14	April 25, 2015	3	5:00	Independence, Missouri, United States	Defended the KC Fighting Alliance Welterweight Championship.
Win	4–2	Jeremy Small	Submission (rear-naked choke)	Kansas City Fighting Alliance 13	January 31, 2015	1	1:16	Independence, Missouri, United States	Won the KC Fighting Alliance Welterweight Championship.
Loss	3–2	Jeremiah Denson	Submission (guillotine choke)	Shamrock FC: High Stakes	May 17, 2014	1	2:54	Kansas City, Missouri, United States	Middleweight bout.
Win	3–1	Tommy O'Neal	Submission (rear-naked choke)	Epic Fight Night 2	December 14, 2013	1	0:42	Kansas City, Missouri, United States	
Loss	2–1	Chance Rencountre	TKO (punches)	Titan FC 26	August 30, 2013	2	0:56	Kansas City, Missouri, United States	
Win	2–0	Nick Felix	Submission (rear-naked choke)	Shamrock FC: Fight Night	April 26, 2013	1	1:37	Kansas City, Missouri, United States	
Win	1–0	Henry Lindsay	Submission (rear-naked choke)	Centurion Fights	March 1, 2013	1	2:09	St. Joseph, Missouri, United States	

== See also ==
- List of male mixed martial artists
