= 2017 in Legacy Fighting Alliance =

Information
- Promotion: Legacy Fighting Alliance
- First date aired: January 13, 2017
- Last date aired: December 15, 2017

2017 was the first year in the history of Legacy Fighting Alliance, a mixed martial arts promotion based in the United States.

== Event list ==
=== Legacy Fighting Alliance 1: Peterson vs. Higo ===
Legacy Fighting Alliance 1: Peterson vs. Higo
- Promotion: Legacy Fighting Alliance
- Date: January 13, 2017
- Venue: The Bomb Factory
- City: Dallas, Texas, U.S.

Event chronology
Inaugurated	Legacy Fighting Alliance 1: Peterson vs. Higo	Legacy Fighting Alliance 2: Richman vs Stojadinovic

Legacy Fighting Alliance 1: Peterson vs. Higo was the inaugural event of Legacy Fighting Alliance and took place on January 13, 2017, after the merger of Legacy Fighting Championship and Resurrection Fighting Alliance. It aired on AXS TV.

Results

Main Card
Weight class				Method	Round	Time	Notes
Bantamweight	Leandro Higo	def.	Steven Peterson	Decision (unanimous)	5	5:00	(Note: For the inaugural LFA Bantamweight Championship.)
Featherweight	Damon Jackson	def.	Charles Cheeks III	Submission (rear-naked choke)	2	1:24
Bantamweight	Eli Tamez	def.	Ulyses Aguila	Decision (split)	3	5:00
Women's Strawweight	Cynthia Calvillo	def.	Montana De La Rosa	TKO (punches)	3	2:54
Catchweight (130 lbs)	Cameron Miller	def.	Oscar Ramirez	Submission (rear-naked choke)	1	0:29
Welterweight	Sean Holden	def.	Armando Servin	Decision (split)	3	5:00
Featherweight	Bobby Butler	def.	Jessie Vasquez	Submission (rear-naked choke)	1	4:36
Preliminary Card
Lightweight	Victor Oreamuno	def.	Jesse Nelson	TKO (punches)	3	1:55
Featherweight	Fernando Salas	def.	Josh Nealy	Submission (armbar)	1	1:00
Amateur Bouts
Flyweight	Victor Altamirano	def.	Marvincent Williams	Submission (triangle choke)	2	0:48
Featherweight	Kenneth Gross	def.	Elijah Johns	TKO (punches)	2	1:44
Bantamweight	Alex Mejia	def.	Anthony Gaut	Submission (rear-naked choke)	1	2:20
Lightweight	Austin Henry	def.	Victor Pasqual	Submission (rear-naked choke)	3	2:50
Flyweight	Steven Orozco	def.	Ricardo Martinez	Decision (unanimous)	3	5:00
Postliminary Card
Featherweight	Charles Williams	def.	Austin Lingo	TKO (punches)	1	0:18	(Note: Amateur bout)
Heavyweight	Rashad Coulter	def.	Larry Hopkins	KO (punches)	1	0:38

=== Legacy Fighting Alliance 2: Richman vs. Stojadinovic ===
Legacy Fighting Alliance 2: Richman vs. Stojadinovic
- Promotion: Legacy Fighting Alliance
- Date: January 20, 2017
- Venue: Mystic Lake Casino Hotel
- City: Prior Lake, Minnesota, U.S.

Event chronology
Legacy Fighting Alliance 1: Peterson vs. Higo	Legacy Fighting Alliance 2: Richman vs. Stojadinovic	Legacy Fighting Alliance 3: Spann vs. Giles

Legacy Fighting Alliance 2: Richman vs. Stojadinovic was the second event of Legacy Fighting Alliance and took place on January 20, 2017. It aired on AXS TV.

Results

Main Card
Weight class				Method	Round	Time	Notes
Featherweight	Lazar Stojadinovic	def.	Mike Richman	Decision (unanimous)	3	5:00
Bantamweight	Chico Camus	def.	Darrick Minner	Decision (unanimous)	3	5:00
Welterweight	Ben Neumann	def.	Damien Hill	Submission (rear-naked choke)	3	2:31
Lightweight	Bobby Lee	def.	Matthew Marsh	Submission (kimura)	1	3:40
Lightweight	Brandon Jenkins	def.	Billy Christianson	TKO (knee and punches)	2	1:41
Bantamweight	Mitch White	def.	Lloyd McKinney	Submission (guillotine choke)	1	0:24
Women's Strawweight	Gabby Romero	def.	Linsey Williams	Submission (rear-naked choke)	1	3:15
Preliminary Card
Lightweight	Christopher Mickle	def.	Benjamin Locken	Submission (arm bar)	1	1:36
Amateur Bouts
Bantamweight	Sean Strube	def.	Kazim Khan	Submission (heel hook)	1	1:06
Heavyweight	Calyn Hull	def.	Philip Rowland	Submission (rear-naked choke)	1	1:00
Featherweight	Vanyu Xiong	def.	Bradley Pitan	TKO (punches)	2	0:20
Catchweight (165 lbs)	Yamah Sadozai	def.	Ryan Schafer	Decision (unanimous)	3	5:00
Light Heavyweight	David Gunn	def.	Alexander Brown	Submission (rear-naked choke)	2	2:34
Catchweight (180 lbs)	Joel Bauman	def.	Adam Valcourt	KO (punches)	1	2:10
Welterweight	Ben Ross	def.	Jason Wong	Decision (majority)	3	5:00
Women's Flyweight	Helen Peralta	def.	Bri Brassaw	Decision (unanimous)	3	5:00

=== Legacy Fighting Alliance 3: Spann vs. Giles ===
Legacy Fighting Alliance 3: Spann vs. Giles
- Promotion: Legacy Fighting Alliance
- Date: February 10, 2017
- Venue: Golden Nugget Hotel and Casino
- City: Lake Charles, Louisiana, U.S.

Event chronology
Legacy Fighting Alliance 2: Richman vs. Stojadinovic	Legacy Fighting Alliance 3: Spann vs. Giles	Legacy Fighting Alliance 4: Aguilar vs. Jackson

Legacy Fighting Alliance 3: Spann vs. Giles was the third event of Legacy Fighting Alliance and took place on February 10, 2017. It aired on AXS TV.

Results

Main Card
Weight class				Method	Round	Time	Notes
Middleweight	Trevin Giles	def.	Ryan Spann	Decision (unanimous)	3	5:00
Middleweight	Brendan Allen	def.	Jon Kirk	TKO (ground and pound)	1	2:46
Featherweight	Thanh Le	def.	Alex Black	TKO (punches)	1	1:43
Bantamweight	Trent Meaux	def.	Caio Machado	Decision (unanimous)	3	5:00
Welterweight	Josh Davila	def.	Ray Blodgett	Decision (unanimous)	3	5:00
Bantamweight	Carlos Vera	def.	Joel Scott	Decision (unanimous)	3	5:00
Middleweight	Brian Wells	def.	Tony Jenkins	Disqualification (illegal knee)	2	4:42
Preliminary Card (Amateur Bouts)
Featherweight	Yan Digilov	def.	Chris Bell	Decision (unanimous)	3	3:00
Lightweight	AJ Fletcher	def.	Jacob Small	TKO (punches)	1	2:00
Welterweight	Justin Crutcher	def.	Francisco Ortiz	Decision (split)	3	3:00
Heavyweight	Raine Andres	def.	James Hatcher	TKO (punches)	3	0:27

=== Legacy Fighting Alliance 4: Aguilar vs. Jackson ===
Legacy Fighting Alliance 4: Aguilar vs. Jackson
- Promotion: Legacy Fighting Alliance
- Date: February 17, 2017
- Venue: Horseshoe Bossier City Hotel and Casino
- City: Bossier City, Louisiana, U.S.

Event chronology
Legacy Fighting Alliance 3: Spann vs. Giles	Legacy Fighting Alliance 4: Aguilar vs. Jackson	Legacy Fighting Alliance 5: Edwards vs. Townsend

Legacy Fighting Alliance 4: Aguilar vs. Jackson was the fourth event of Legacy Fighting Alliance and took place on February 17, 2017. It aired on AXS TV.

Results

Main Card
Weight class				Method	Round	Time	Notes
Featherweight	Kevin Aguilar	def.	Damon Jackson	TKO (punches)	3	4:05	(Note: For the inaugural LFA Featherweight Championship.)
Women's Flyweight	Andrea Lee	def.	Heather Bassett	Submission (armbar)	3	3:40	(Note: For the inaugural LFA Women's Flyweight Championship.)
Welterweight	Derrick Krantz	def.	Hayward Charles	Decision (unanimous)	3	5:00
Lightweight	Bryan Billiot	def.	David Bosnick	Submission (heel hook)	2	0:57
Welterweight	Chauncey Foxworth	def.	Nicholas Jackson	Decision (unanimous)	3	5:00
Lightweight	Brandon Shavers	def.	Mike Murphy	Decision (unanimous)	3	5:00
Preliminary Card
Featherweight	Jesse Butler	def.	Ricky Murphy	Decision (unanimous)	3	5:00
Featherweight	Kendrick Williams	def.	Edward Longoria	KO (punches)	2	2:00
Welterweight	Jared Owen	def.	Aaron Trecell	Submission (armbar)	1	3:44
Featherweight	Ariel Jaurez	def.	Robin White	Submission (triangle choke)	1	4:10
Amateur Bouts
Flyweight	Zach Albritton	def.	Berto Grimaldo	Decision (unanimous)	3	3:00
Women's Flyweight	Jessica Sotack	def.	Victoria Leonardo	Decision (unanimous)	3	3:00
Lightweight	Jake Foster	def.	Michael Mintz	Submission (triangle choke)	1	0:45

=== Legacy Fighting Alliance 5: Edwards vs. Townsend ===
Legacy Fighting Alliance 5: Edwards vs. Townsend
- Promotion: Legacy Fighting Alliance
- Date: February 24, 2017
- Venue: 1stBank Center
- City: Broomfield, Colorado, U.S.

Event chronology
Legacy Fighting Alliance 4: Aguilar vs. Jackson	Legacy Fighting Alliance 5: Edwards vs. Townsend	Legacy Fighting Alliance 6: Junior vs. Rodriguez

Legacy Fighting Alliance 5: Edwards vs. Townsend was the fifth event of Legacy Fighting Alliance and took place on February 24, 2017. It aired on AXS TV.

Results

Main Card
Weight class				Method	Round	Time	Notes
Lightweight	Adam Townsend	def.	Marcus Edwards	TKO (punches)	3	4:53
Featherweight	Jamall Emmers	def.	Cory Sandhagen	Decision (unanimous)	3	5:00
Welterweight	Matthew Frincu	def.	Kris Hocum	Decision (unanimous)	3	5:00
Lightweight	Matt Johnson	def.	Le'Ville Simpson	Decision (unanimous)	3	5:00
Flyweight	Brandon Royval	def.	Rakan Adwan	Submission (armbar)	1	1:54
Lightweight	Slobodan Maksimović	def.	Eric Grant	Decision (unanimous)	3	5:00
Lightweight	Arut Pogosjan	def.	Nicholi Navarro	Decision (split)	3	5:00
Preliminary Card
Lightweight	Enrique Gonzalez	def.	Maurice Salazar	KO (punch)	1	4:55
Welterweight	Cody Yohn	def.	Josh Watson	Submission (rear-naked choke)	1	3:38
Amateur Bouts
Flyweight	John Decrescenzo	def.	Oscar Herrera	Decision (unanimous)	3	3:00

=== Legacy Fighting Alliance 6: Junior vs. Rodriguez ===
Legacy Fighting Alliance 6: Junior vs. Rodriguez
- Promotion: Legacy Fighting Alliance
- Date: March 10, 2017
- Venue: Cowboys Dancehall
- City: San Antonio, Texas, U.S.

Event chronology
Legacy Fighting Alliance 5: Edwards vs. Townsend	Legacy Fighting Alliance 6: Junior vs. Rodriguez	Legacy Fighting Alliance 7: Sanchez vs. Mai

Legacy Fighting Alliance 6: Junior vs. Rodriguez was the sixth event of Legacy Fighting Alliance and took place on March 10, 2017. It aired on AXS TV.

Results

Main Card
Weight class				Method	Round	Time	Notes
Featherweight	Ray Rodriguez	def.	Rivaldo Junior	Decision (split)	3	5:00
Middleweight	Eryk Anders	def.	Jon Kirk	TKO (punches)	1	1:35
Women's Catchweight (120 lbs)	Mackenzie Dern	def.	Katherine Roy	Decision (unanimous)	3	5:00
Heavyweight	Richard Odoms	def.	Willian Hoffmann	TKO (kick and punches)	2	1:25
Featherweight	Gleidson Cutis	def.	Dimitre Ivy	Submission (grapevine)	1	2:38
Welterweight	Anthony Ivy	def.	Arthur Ashton	Submission (rear-naked choke)	1	2:04
Preliminary Card (Amateur Bouts)
Featherweight	Damian Alfaro	def.	William Walker	Submission (triangle choke)	3	2:09
Bantamweight	Jonathan Gomez	def.	Patrick Ferguson	Submission (D’Arce choke)	3	1:54
Lightweight	Marcell Mickens	def.	Tomas Suarez	TKO (punches)	2	2:39

=== Legacy Fighting Alliance 7: Sanchez vs. Mai ===
Legacy Fighting Alliance 7: Sanchez vs. Mai
- Promotion: Legacy Fighting Alliance
- Date: March 24, 2017
- Venue: Arena Theatre
- City: Houston, Texas, U.S.

Event chronology
Legacy Fighting Alliance 6: Junior vs. Rodriguez	Legacy Fighting Alliance 7: Sanchez vs. Mai	Legacy Fighting Alliance 8: Hamilton vs. Bazzi

Legacy Fighting Alliance 7: Sanchez vs. Mai was the seventh event of Legacy Fighting Alliance and took place on March 24, 2017. It aired on AXS TV.

Results

Main Card
Weight class				Method	Round	Time	Notes
Flyweight	Roberto Sanchez	def.	Klayton Mai	Submission (rear-naked choke)	2	2:08
Bantamweight	Domingo Pilarte	def.	Adrian Yañez	Decision (split)	3	5:00
Middleweight	Gilbert Urbina	def.	Noel Ligon	Submission (rear-naked choke)	1	3:01
Welterweight	Nikolay Veretennikov	def.	Clovis Hancock	TKO (head kick)	3	2:21
Welterweight	Jason Langellier	def.	Josh Davila	Decision (unanimous)	3	5:00
Women's Strawweight	Itzel Esquivel	def.	Brandi Narvaez	Submission (triangle armbar)	1	4:35
Bantamweight	Dulani Perry	def.	Leomana Martinez	Decision (split)	3	5:00
Preliminary Card
Featherweight	Javier Obregon	def.	David Armas	Decision (unanimous)	3	5:00
Featherweight	Omar Hillail	def.	Yan Digilov	Submission (triangle armbar)	1	4:10
Amateur Bouts
Flyweight	Jonathan Davis	def.	Anthony Torres	KO (punches)	3	2:35
Flyweight	Eduardo Anaya	def.	Dominick Perez	Decision (split)	3	3:00

=== Legacy Fighting Alliance 8: Hamilton vs. Bazzi ===
Legacy Fighting Alliance 8: Hamilton vs. Bazzi
- Promotion: Legacy Fighting Alliance
- Date: April 7, 2017
- Venue: TD Convention Center
- City: Greenville, South Carolina, U.S.

Event chronology
Legacy Fighting Alliance 7: Sanchez vs. Mai	Legacy Fighting Alliance 8: Hamilton vs. Bazzi	Legacy Fighting Alliance 9: Dennis vs. Marques

Legacy Fighting Alliance 8: Hamilton vs. Bazzi was the eighth event of Legacy Fighting Alliance and took place on April 7, 2017 at the TD Convention Center. It aired on AXS TV.

Results

Main Card
Weight class				Method	Round	Time	Notes
Flyweight	Cee Jay Hamilton	def.	Jesse Bazzi	Decision (unanimous)	3	5:00
Welterweight	Jeremie Holloway	def.	Dave Vitkay	TKO (punches)	1	2:55
Flyweight	Jared Scoggins	def.	Juan Puerta	Decision (unanimous)	3	5:00
Featherweight	Keith Richardson	def.	Jon Queiroz	Decision (split)	3	5:00
Lightweight	Joe Elmore	def.	Ryan Jett	Submission (armbar)	3	3:05
Bantamweight	John Sweeney	def.	Jon Sparks	Submission (rear-naked choke)	1	2:45
Women's Catchweight (140 lbs)	Alexa Conners	def.	Calie Cutler	Decision (unanimous)	3	5:00
Preliminary Card
Middleweight	Roger Pratcher	def.	Jay Gray	Decision (split)	3	5:00
Amateur Bouts
Women's Bantamweight	Anna Crutchfield	def.	Mary Matia	Decision (split)	3	3:00
Flyweight	Anthony Canzano	def.	Romondo Scott	Submission (guillotine choke)	1	1:56
Featherweight	Akeem Bashir	def.	Deliverance Mpuati	KO (punches)	2	1:14
Catchweight	Ernest Robinson	def.	Jhay Boyd	KO (punches)	1	0:53
Featherweight	Tony Lester Rogers III	def.	Koyya Russell	Decision (unanimous)	3	3:00
Women's Strawweight	Jennifer Waters	def.	Alex McBride	TKO (punches)	2	2:26
Heavyweight	Michel Andre	def.	Bryan Battle	KO (punches)	1	1:54
Middleweight	Stan Easterling	def.	Chance Green	KO (punches)	1	0:31

=== Legacy Fighting Alliance 9: Dennis vs. Marques ===
Legacy Fighting Alliance 9: Dennis vs. Marques
- Promotion: Legacy Fighting Alliance
- Date: April 14, 2017
- Venue: Firelake Arena
- City: Shawnee, Oklahoma, U.S.

Event chronology
Legacy Fighting Alliance 8: Hamilton vs. Bazzi	Legacy Fighting Alliance 9: Dennis vs. Marques	Legacy Fighting Alliance 10: Heinisch vs. Rota

Legacy Fighting Alliance 9: Dennis vs. Marques was the ninth event of Legacy Fighting Alliance and took place on April 14, 2017. It aired on AXS TV.

Results

Main Card
Weight class				Method	Round	Time	Notes
Light Heavyweight	Myron Dennis	def.	Danilo Marques	Decision (split)	3	5:00
Heavyweight	Don'Tale Mayes	def.	Demoreo Dennis	Decision (unanimous)	3	5:00
Women's Flyweight	Sabina Mazo	def.	Jamie Thorton	KO/TKO (head kick)	1	4:50
Lightweight	Kyle Driscoll	def.	Jose Martinez	Decision (unanimous)	3	5:00
Bantamweight	Travis Quintero	def.	Nathan Trepagnier	Decision (unanimous)	3	5:00
Featherweight	Eddie Brown	def.	Malcolm Hill	Decision (unanimous)	3	5:00
Featherweight	JR Coughran	def.	Daniel Carey	Decision (majority)	3	5:00
Preliminary Card
Lightweight	AJ Nichols	def.	Josh Anderson	DQ (illegal knee)	2	4:12
Lightweight	Charles Williams	def.	Kevin Goodin	Decision (unanimous)	3	5:00
Amateur Bouts
Women's Flyweight	Kristina Williams	def.	Rachel Young	Decision (unanimous)	3	3:00
Featherweight	Triston Gwaltney	def.	Michael Smith	KO/TKO (retirement)	2	3:00

=== Legacy Fighting Alliance 10: Heinisch vs. Rota ===
Legacy Fighting Alliance 10: Heinisch vs. Rota
- Promotion: Legacy Fighting Alliance
- Date: April 21, 2017
- Venue: Massari Arena
- City: Pueblo, Colorado, U.S.

Event chronology
Legacy Fighting Alliance 9: Dennis vs. Marques	Legacy Fighting Alliance 10: Heinisch vs. Rota	Legacy Fighting Alliance Fight Night 1: Sioux Falls

Legacy Fighting Alliance 10: Heinisch vs. Rota was the tenth event of Legacy Fighting Alliance and took place on April 21, 2017. It aired on AXS TV.

Results

Main Card
Weight class				Method	Round	Time	Notes
Middleweight	Ian Heinisch	def.	Lucas Rota	Submission (scarf hold keylock)	1	2:38
Flyweight	Nick Urso	def.	Brandon Royval	Decision (split)	3	5:00
Bantamweight	Jerome Rivera	def.	Zac Riley	Decision (unanimous)	3	5:00
Lightweight	Slobodan Maksimovic	def.	Domonic Montoya	Decision (unanimous)	3	5:00
Featherweight	Andrew Tenneson	def.	Andrew Yates	Submission (guillotine choke)	1	0:49
Bantamweight	Adam Martinez	def.	Maikel Pérez	Submission (guillotine choke)	2	2:22
Welterweight	Cody Yohn	def.	Mike Jones	Decision (split)	3	5:00
Preliminary Card
Middleweight	Bevon Lewis	def.	Sonny Yohn	Decision (unanimous)	3	5:00
Welterweight	Jordan Titoni	def.	Joel Whitney	Submission (rear-naked choke)	3	4:17
Amateur Bouts
Welterweight	Matt Addington	def.	Jack Mondragon	TKO (ground and pound)	1	1:00
Bantamweight	Robert Trujillo	def.	Joshua Morales	Submission (rear-naked choke)	1	2:21
Women's Strawweight	Alyssa Garcia	def.	Tabitha Trevino	Submission (armbar)	1	0:57

=== Legacy Fighting Alliance Fight Night 1: Sioux Falls ===
Legacy Fighting Alliance Fight Night 1: Sioux Falls
- Promotion: Legacy Fighting Alliance
- Date: April 29, 2017
- Venue: Sanford Pentagon
- City: Sioux Falls, South Dakota, U.S.

Event chronology
Legacy Fighting Alliance 10: Heinisch vs. Rota	Legacy Fighting Alliance Fight Night 1: Sioux Falls	Legacy Fighting Alliance 11: Frincu vs. Madrid

Legacy Fighting Alliance Fight Night 1: Sioux Falls was the eleventh event of Legacy Fighting Alliance and took place on April 29, 2017. It aired on AXS TV.

Results

Main Card
Weight class				Method	Round	Time	Notes
Welterweight	David Michaud	def.	Jake Lindsey	TKO (injury)	3	1:14
Flyweight	Sid Bice	def.	Cody Land	Decision (unanimous)	3	5:00
Catchweight (140 lbs)	Vinicius Zani	def.	William Joplin	TKO (punches)	3	4:22
Welterweight	Jordon Larson	def.	Dakota Cochrane	Disqualification (illegal knee)	2	1:15
Welterweight	Logan Storley	def.	Andres Murray	TKO (punches)	1	1:13
Light Heavyweight	Daniel Sarafian	def.	Austen Heidlage	Decision (unanimous)	3	5:00
Catchweight (190 lbs)	Deron Winn	def.	Deven Fisher	TKO (punches)	1	1:40
Preliminary Card
Welterweight	Tyler Ray	def.	Ben Simons	Submission (guillotine choke)	1	3:19
Welterweight	Cody Lincoln	def.	Derek Varin	Submission (rear-naked choke)	1	2:55
Featherweight	Emeka Ifekandu	def.	Devin Turner	TKO (referee stoppage)	1	1:34
Lightweight	Boimah Karmo	def.	Logan McPadden	TKO (referee stoppage)	2	4:56
Amateur Bouts
Featherweight	Jeffrey Diaz	def.	Josh Krejci	Decision (unanimous)	3	3:00

=== Legacy Fighting Alliance 11: Frincu vs. Mendonça ===
Legacy Fighting Alliance 11: Frincu vs. Mendonça
- Promotion: Legacy Fighting Alliance
- Date: May 5, 2017
- Venue: Comerica Theater
- City: Phoenix, Arizona, U.S.

Event chronology
Legacy Fighting Alliance Fight Night 1: Sioux Falls	Legacy Fighting Alliance 11: Frincu vs. Mendonça	Legacy Fighting Alliance 12: Krantz vs. Neumann

Legacy Fighting Alliance 11: Frincu vs. Mendonça was the twelfth event of Legacy Fighting Alliance and took place on May 5, 2017. It aired on AXS TV.

Results

Main Card
Weight class				Method	Round	Time	Notes
Middleweight	Matthew Frincu	def.	Maycon Mendonça	KO (punches)	1	1:36
Welterweight	James Nakashima	def.	LaRue Burley	Decision (unanimous)	3	5:00
Welterweight	Kyle Stewart	def.	Ty Freeman	Submission (shoulder lock)	1	2:25
Flyweight	Casey Kenney	vs.	Bruno Gustavo da Silva	Draw (split)	3	5:00
Bantamweight	Sean O'Malley	def.	David Nuzzo	KO (head kick)	1	2:15
Featherweight	Toninho Gavinho	def.	Mike Hamel	TKO (punches)	1	0:32
Lightweight	Keoni Diggs	def.	Tyler Sidders	Submission (rear-naked choke)	2	3:57
Preliminary Card
Middleweight	Taylor Johnson	def.	Dan Huber	KO (punches)	1	0:08
Flyweight	Richard Palencia	def.	Fard Muhammad	Submission (rear-naked choke)	2	2:59

=== Legacy Fighting Alliance 12: Krantz vs. Neumann ===
Legacy Fighting Alliance 12: Krantz vs. Neumann
- Promotion: Legacy Fighting Alliance
- Date: May 19, 2017
- Venue: Mystic Lake Casino Hotel
- City: Prior Lake, Minnesota, U.S.

Event chronology
Legacy Fighting Alliance 11: Frincu vs. Mendonça	Legacy Fighting Alliance 12: Krantz vs. Neumann	Legacy Fighting Alliance 13: Millender vs. Holland

Legacy Fighting Alliance 12: Krantz vs. Neumann was the thirteenth event of Legacy Fighting Alliance and took place on May 19, 2017. It aired on AXS TV.

Results

Main Card
Weight class				Method	Round	Time	Notes
Welterweight	Derrick Krantz	def.	Ben Neumann	TKO (punches)	2	0:55	(Note: For the inaugural LFA Welterweight Championship.)
Middleweight	Chase Waldon	def.	Cully Butterfield	Decision (split)	3	5:00
Welterweight	Chad Curry	def.	Kyle Kurtz	TKO (punches)	2	0:59
Lightweight	Jeff Peterson	def.	Bobby Lee	Decision (unanimous)	3	5:00
Light Heavyweight	Julian Marquez	def.	Cameron Olson	KO (punch)	1	1:06
Featherweight	Nate Jennerman	def.	Damion Hill	Submission (guillotine choke)	1	4:50
Preliminary Card
Women's Strawweight	Linsey Williams	def.	Carmella James	Decision (unanimous)	3	5:00
Amateur Bouts
Featherweight	Drako Rodriguez	def.	Vanyu Xiong	Decision (unanimous)	3	3:00
Lightweight	Bobbe Dulitz	def.	Yamah Sadozai	Decision (unanimous)	3	3:00
Welterweight	Scott Writz	def.	Ben Ross	TKO (punches)	1	0:45
Women's Catchweight	Bonnie Stoehr	def.	Kaylee Martin	TKO (punches)	1	1:32
Flyweight	Robiel Tesfaldet	def.	Kai Brunk	TKO (punches)	3	2:09

=== Legacy Fighting Alliance 13: Millender vs. Holland ===
Legacy Fighting Alliance 13: Millender vs. Holland
- Promotion: Legacy Fighting Alliance
- Date: June 2, 2017
- Venue: Los Angeles-Burbank Marriott Convention Center
- City: Burbank, California, U.S.

Event chronology
Legacy Fighting Alliance 12: Krantz vs. Neumann	Legacy Fighting Alliance 13: Millender vs. Holland	Legacy Fighting Alliance 14: Allen vs. Anders

Legacy Fighting Alliance 13: Millender vs. Holland was the fourteenth event of Legacy Fighting Alliance and took place on June 2, 2017. It aired on AXS TV.

Results

Main Card
Weight class				Method	Round	Time	Notes
Welterweight	Curtis Millender	def.	Kevin Holland	Decision (unanimous)	3	5:00
Lightweight	Karen Darabedyan	def.	Sam Liera	Submission (rear-naked choke)	2	1:46
Light Heavyweight	Dominick Reyes	def.	Jordan Powell	KO (head kick)	1	0:53
Light Heavyweight	Alonzo Menifield	def.	Khadzhi Bestaev	Submission (strikes)	1	4:01
Bantamweight	Maikel Pérez	def.	Trent Meaux	Submission (rear-naked choke)	1	4:00
Light Heavyweight	Herdem Alacabek	def.	Antônio Arroyo	Submission (rear-naked choke)	1	3:51
Bantamweight	Kyler Phillips	def.	Jonny Quiroz	Decision (unanimous)	3	5:00
Preliminary Card
Lightweight	Dmitry Gerasimov	def.	Fabio Trindade	Submission (D'Arce choke)	1	3:21
Postliminary Card
Lightweight	Tommy Aaron	def.	Austin Wilson	KO (punch)	1	0:18
Bantamweight	Vincent Cachero	def.	Arnold Jimenez	Submission (rear-naked choke)	2	4:46

=== Legacy Fighting Alliance 14: Allen vs. Anders ===
Legacy Fighting Alliance 14: Allen vs. Anders
- Promotion: Legacy Fighting Alliance
- Date: June 23, 2017
- Venue: Arena Theatre
- City: Houston, Texas, U.S.

Event chronology
Legacy Fighting Alliance 13: Millender vs. Holland	Legacy Fighting Alliance 14: Allen vs. Anders	Legacy Fighting Alliance 15: Odoms vs. Vanderaa

Legacy Fighting Alliance 14: Allen vs. Anders was the fifteenth event of Legacy Fighting Alliance and took place on June 23, 2017. It aired on AXS TV.

Results

Main Card
Weight class				Method	Round	Time	Notes
Middleweight	Eryk Anders	def.	Brendan Allen	Decision (unanimous)	5	5:00	(Note: For the inaugural LFA Middleweight Championship.)
Flyweight	Roberto Sanchez	def.	Jerome Rivera	Submission (armbar)	3	3:41	(Note: For the inaugural LFA Flyweight Championship.)
Middleweight	Danny Orr	def.	Noel Ligon	Decision (split)	3	5:00
Bantamweight	Dulani Perry	def.	Dave Acosta	Decision (split)	3	5:00
Women’s Bantamweight	Courtney King	def.	Colbey Northcutt	TKO (punches)	2	3:27
Women’s Strawweight	Maycee Barber	def.	Itzel Esquivel	Submission (armbar)	1	3:52
Preliminary Card
Bantamweight	Manny Lozoya	def.	Shakeem Richardson	Decision (unanimous)	3	5:00
Heavyweight	Juan Adams	def.	Chris Rose	TKO (elbows)	1	1:11
Amateur Bouts
Flyweight	Joseph Aguilar	def.	Jonathan Davis	KO (punch)	1	1:13
Flyweight	Jordan Carmona	def.	Victor Altamirano	Submission (rear-naked choke)	1	1:24
Bantamweight	Chris Soliz	def.	Victor Lomax	TKO (punches)	1	2:51
Women's Strawweight	Karla Hernandez	def.	Emilee Hoffman	TKO (punches)	2	1:59

=== Legacy Fighting Alliance 15: Odoms vs. Vanderaa ===
Legacy Fighting Alliance 15: Odoms vs. Vanderaa
- Promotion: Legacy Fighting Alliance
- Date: June 30, 2017
- Venue: Firelake Arena
- City: Shawnee, Oklahoma, U.S.

Event chronology
Legacy Fighting Alliance 14: Allen vs. Anders	Legacy Fighting Alliance 15: Odoms vs. Vanderaa	Legacy Fighting Alliance 16: Bedford vs. Flick

Legacy Fighting Alliance 15: Odoms vs. Vanderaa was the sixteenth event of Legacy Fighting Alliance and took place on June 30, 2017. It aired on AXS TV.

Results

Main Card
Weight class				Method	Round	Time	Notes
Heavyweight	Richard Odoms	def.	Jared Vanderaa	Submission (kimura)	5	2:45	(Note: For the inaugural LFA Heavyweight Championship.)
Middleweight	Chris Harris	def.	Cortez Coleman	Decision (unanimous)	3	5:00
Welterweight	Braden Smith	def.	Manny Meraz	Submission (D’Arce choke)	1	2:11
Lightweight	Dan Moret	def.	Derrick Adkins	Submission (arm-triangle choke)	3	4:59
Bantamweight	Tyler Shinn	def.	Kendall Carnahan	Decision (split)	3	5:00
Featherweight	Justin Rader	def.	Emmanuel Rivera	Decision (unanimous)	3	5:00
Middleweight	Chibwikem Onyenegecha	def.	Stephen Skoch	TKO (knees)	1	3:40
Preliminary Card
Featherweight	Eddie Brown	def.	Diego Pichilingue	Submission (rear-naked choke)	2	2:24
Middleweight	Tyler Lee	def.	Richard Lasher	Submission (rear-naked choke)	1	2:43
Amateur Bouts
Light Heavyweight	Taylor Wilson	def.	Matthew Coe	Decision (unanimous)	3	3:00

=== Legacy Fighting Alliance 16: Bedford vs. Flick ===
Legacy Fighting Alliance 16: Bedford vs. Flick
- Promotion: Legacy Fighting Alliance
- Date: July 14, 2017
- Venue: The Bomb Factory
- City: Dallas, Texas, U.S.

Event chronology
Legacy Fighting Alliance 15: Odoms vs. Vanderaa	Legacy Fighting Alliance 16: Bedford vs. Flick	Legacy Fighting Alliance 17: Moisés vs. Watley

Legacy Fighting Alliance 16: Bedford vs. Flick was the seventeenth event of Legacy Fighting Alliance and took place on July 14, 2017. It aired on AXS TV.

Results

Main Card
Weight class				Method	Round	Time	Notes
Bantamweight	Jimmy Flick	def.	Johnny Bedford	Technical Submission (guillotine choke)	3	3:09
Bantamweight	Miles Johns	def.	Levi Mowles	Decision (unanimous)	3	5:00
Catchweight (140 lbs)	Steven Peterson	def.	Ryan Hollis	Submission (rear-naked choke)	2	1:43
Welterweight	Geoff Neal	def.	Bilal Williams	KO (punch)	1	4:43
Featherweight	Damon Jackson	def.	Eliazar Rodriguez	Submission (rear-naked choke)	1	3:49
Bantamweight	Brandon Lewis	def.	Cameron Miller	Submission (rear-naked choke)	2	1:44
Featherweight	Fernando Salas	def.	Jessie Vasquez	Decision (unanimous)	3	5:00
Preliminary Card
Catchweight (150 lbs)	Austin Lingo	def.	Charles Williams	Decision (unanimous)	3	5:00
Amateur Bouts
Flyweight	Andrew Duran	def.	Anthony Gaut	TKO (punches)	2	1:56
Flyweight	Kyle Coronado	def.	Rashaad Robinson	KO (punch)	1	1:56
Bantamweight	Devin Miller	def.	John Pham	TKO (punches)	2	1:20
Postliminary Card (Amateur Bouts)
Welterweight	Dustin Martinez	def.	Garrett Foster	TKO (punches)	1	0:30
Flyweight	Xavier Franklin	def.	Steven Orozco	TKO (punches)	2	2:15
Flyweight	Anthony Huynh	def.	Jesus Martinez	Decision (split)	3	3:00

=== Legacy Fighting Alliance 17: Moisés vs. Watley ===
Legacy Fighting Alliance 17: Moisés vs. Watley
- Promotion: Legacy Fighting Alliance
- Date: July 21, 2017
- Venue: Grady Cole Center
- City: Charlotte, North Carolina, U.S.

Event chronology
Legacy Fighting Alliance 16: Lee vs. Maciel	Legacy Fighting Alliance 17: Moisés vs. Watley	Legacy Fighting Alliance 18: Aguilar vs. Rader

Legacy Fighting Alliance 17: Moisés vs. Watley was the eighteenth event of Legacy Fighting Alliance and took place on July 21, 2017. It aired on AXS TV.

Results

Main Card
Weight class				Method	Round	Time	Notes
Lightweight	Robert Watley	def.	Thiago Moisés	Decision (unanimous)	5	5:00	(Note: For the inaugural LFA Lightweight Championship.)
Catchweight (140 lbs)	Tony Gravely	def.	Keith Richardson	Decision (unanimous)	3	5:00
Catchweight (160 lbs)	Mike Stevens	def.	Hugo Hernando Prada	TKO (referee stoppage)	2	3:47
Heavyweight	Boom Gordon	def.	Chandler Cole	TKO (referee stoppage)	1	4:25
Featherweight	John Sweeney	def.	Shelton Sales	Technical Submission (guillotine choke)	1	1:57
Lightweight	Ryan Jett	def.	Nick Rodrigues	Decision (split)	3	5:00
Preliminary Card
Middleweight	Chase Gamble	def.	Harold Hubbard	Decision (unanimous)	3	5:00
Amateur Bouts
Lightweight	Nathen Arriaga	def.	Jaywin Wilson	TKO (punches)	1	2:46
Flyweight	Devin Nguyen	def.	Chase Calloway	Submission (rear-naked choke)	3	2:50
Bantamweight	Billy Alexander	def.	Tony Edgar Rogers	Submission (guillotine choke)	3	1:12
Welterweight	Michael Gabriel	def.	Jhay Boyd	KO (punch)	3	0:24
Lightweight	Grayson Wassweiler	def.	Austin Munsch	TKO (punches)	1	1:57
Bantamweight	Frankie Kandaya	def.	Daniel Rodriguez	Decision (unanimous)	3	3:00
Middleweight	Matthew Fleming	def.	Miles Belk	TKO (punches)	3	2:09

=== Legacy Fighting Alliance 18: Aguilar vs. Rader ===
Legacy Fighting Alliance 18: Aguilar vs. Rader
- Promotion: Legacy Fighting Alliance
- Date: August 4, 2017
- Venue: Firelake Arena
- City: Shawnee, Oklahoma, U.S.

Event chronology
Legacy Fighting Alliance 17: Moisés vs. Watley	Legacy Fighting Alliance 18: Aguilar vs. Rader	Legacy Fighting Alliance 19: Michaud vs. Rodrigues

Legacy Fighting Alliance 18: Aguilar vs. Rader was the nineteenth event of Legacy Fighting Alliance and took place on August 4, 2017. It aired on AXS TV.

Results

Main Card
Weight class				Method	Round	Time	Notes
Featherweight	Kevin Aguilar (c)	def.	Justin Rader	Decision (unanimous)	5	5:00	(Note: For the LFA Featherweight Championship.)
Middleweight	Brendan Allen	def.	Chris Harris	Submission (triangle choke)	2	1:22
Catchweight (130 lbs)	Chris Kelades	def.	Tyler Shinn	Decision (unanimous)	3	5:00
Welterweight	Chauncey Foxworth	def.	Braden Smith	TKO (referee stoppage)	3	4:31
Lightweight	Daryl Wilson	def.	Jarrod Card	KO (punch)	1	1:04
Lightweight	Derrick Adkins	def.	Kyle Driscoll	Decision (unanimous)	3	5:00
Lightweight	Jose Martinez	def.	James Warren	TKO (referee stoppage)	3	1:29
Preliminary Card
Lightweight	Brant Moore	def.	AJ Nichols	Submission (rear-naked choke)	1	4:34
Featherweight	Daniel Carey	def.	Thomas Lopez	Submission (rear-naked choke)	3	1:36
Amateur Bouts
Bantamweight	Tevin Laskey	def.	Blake Morton	TKO (punches)	1	2:46
Featherweight	Jerry Wilkins	def.	Michael Smith	TKO (liver kick and punches)	2	1:55
Flyweight	Victor Gonzalez	def.	Zak Alm	Submission (triangle choke)	2	0:36
Light Heavyweight	Jake Benton	def.	Erick Rios	Decision (unanimous)	3	3:00

=== Legacy Fighting Alliance 19: Michaud vs. Rodrigues ===
Legacy Fighting Alliance 19: Michaud vs. Rodrigues
- Promotion: Legacy Fighting Alliance
- Date: August 18, 2017
- Venue: Sanford Pentagon
- City: Sioux Falls, South Dakota, U.S.

Event chronology
Legacy Fighting Alliance 18: Aguilar vs. Rader	Legacy Fighting Alliance 19: Michaud vs. Rodrigues	Legacy Fighting Alliance 20: Curry vs. Barnes

Legacy Fighting Alliance 19: Michaud vs. Rodrigues was the twentieth event of Legacy Fighting Alliance and took place on August 18, 2017. It aired on AXS TV.

Results

Main Card
Weight class				Method	Round	Time	Notes
Welterweight	Ciro Rodrigues	def.	David Michaud	TKO (punches)	1	1:57
Flyweight	Sid Bice	def.	Kenny Porter	Decision (unanimous)	3	5:00
Welterweight	Marcus Edwards	def.	Clarence Jordan	Decision (unanimous)	3	5:00
Flyweight	Maikel Pérez	def.	Derrick Mandell	Decision (unanimous)	3	5:00
Heavyweight	Maurice Greene	def.	Jermaine McDermott	Submission (triangle choke)	1	3:06
Bantamweight	Emeka Ifekandu	def.	Steven Merrill	TKO (punches)	3	1:25
Welterweight	J.P. Saint Louis	def.	Tyler Ray	Submission (guillotine choke)	1	1:44
Preliminary Card
Heavyweight	Ryan Debelak	def.	Ivan Tereschenko	TKO (punches)	1	2:06
Bantamweight	Robiel Tesfaldet	def.	Anthony Yost	TKO (punches)	1	2:59
Amateur Bouts
Featherweight	Kevin Diaz	def.	Ricky Ortiz	KO (head kick)	1	1:53
Light Heavyweight	Alex Messmer	def.	Austin Ovre	Submission (rear-naked choke)	1	2:52

=== Legacy Fighting Alliance 20: Curry vs. Barnes ===
Legacy Fighting Alliance 20: Curry vs. Barnes
- Promotion: Legacy Fighting Alliance
- Date: August 25, 2017
- Venue: Mystic Lake Casino Hotel
- City: Prior Lake, Minnesota, U.S.

Event chronology
Legacy Fighting Alliance 19: Michaud vs. Rodrigues	Legacy Fighting Alliance 20: Curry vs. Barnes	Legacy Fighting Alliance 21: Noblitt vs. Branjão

Legacy Fighting Alliance 20: Curry vs. Barnes was the twenty-first event of Legacy Fighting Alliance and took place on August 25, 2017. It aired on AXS TV.

Results

Main Card
Weight class				Method	Round	Time	Notes
Welterweight	Nick Barnes	def.	Chad Curry	Decision (split)	3	5:00
Featherweight	Bobby Moffett	def.	Nate Jennerman	Decision (unanimous)	3	5:00
Women's Flyweight	Kelly Kobold	vs.	Christine Stanley	Draw (split)	3	5:00
Lightweight	Travis Perzynski	def.	Carl Wittstock	Technical Submission (rear-naked choke)	1	1:49
Lightweight	Bobby Lee	def.	Ashkan Morvari	Decision (split)	3	5:00
Lightweight	Jeff Peterson	def.	Brandon Jenkins	Decision (split)	3	5:00
Featherweight	Shawn West	def.	Melvin Blumer	TKO (referee stoppage)	3	1:27
Preliminary Card (Amateur Bouts)
Featherweight	Angel Pacheco	def.	Vanyu Xiong	TKO (doctor stoppage)	2	5:00
Catchweight (140 lbs)	Caleb Merth	def.	Christian Rodriguez	Decision (unanimous)	3	3:00
Bantamweight	Bryan Bautista	def.	Tyler Manning	Submission (guillotine choke)	1	0:35

=== Legacy Fighting Alliance 21: Noblitt vs. Branjão ===
Legacy Fighting Alliance 21: Noblitt vs. Branjão
- Promotion: Legacy Fighting Alliance
- Date: September 1, 2017
- Venue: Branson Convention Center
- City: Branson, Missouri, U.S.

Event chronology
Legacy Fighting Alliance 20: Curry vs. Barnes	Legacy Fighting Alliance 21: Noblitt vs. Branjão	Legacy Fighting Alliance 22: Heinisch vs. Perez

Legacy Fighting Alliance 21: Noblitt vs. Branjão was the twenty-second event of Legacy Fighting Alliance and took place on September 1, 2017. It aired on AXS TV.

Results

Main Card
Weight class				Method	Round	Time	Notes
Light Heavyweight	Kyle Noblitt	def.	Antônio Branjão	Submission (guillotine choke)	1	4:13
Middleweight	Kevin Holland	def.	Grady Hurley	TKO (knees and punches)	1	1:24
Lightweight	Trey Ogden	def.	T.J. Brown	Submission (rear-naked choke)	1	2:27
Women’s Flyweight	Shannon Sinn	def.	Katy Collins	Decision (unanimous)	3	5:00
Flyweight	Charles Johnson	def.	Jeremiah Cullum	Decision (split)	3	5:00
Featherweight	Yazan Hajeh	def.	Oscar Valdez	Decision (split)	3	5:00
Lightweight	Dakota Bush	def.	Jose Martinez	Submission (rear-naked choke)	1	2:01
Preliminary Card
Flyweight	Xavier Siller	def.	Miles McDonald	Submission (triangle choke)	1	4:51
Middleweight	Tyler Lee	def.	Frank Cortez	Submission (kimura)	1	1:18
Lightweight	Clayton Brown	def.	Adam Mink	Submission (guillotine choke)	1	3:52
Amateur Bouts
Catchweight (150 lbs)	Quinten Davidson	def.	Richard Mays	Submission (triangle choke)	2	2:57
Lightweight	John Bui	def.	Pablo Brenes	TKO (referee stoppage)	1	1:51
Catchweight (160 lbs)	Malik Lewis	def.	Andrew Siegismund	KO (punch)	1	1:45
Catchweight (195 lbs)	Eric Favella	def.	Mario Moreno	KO (punch)	1	1:00

=== Legacy Fighting Alliance 22: Heinisch vs. Perez ===
Legacy Fighting Alliance 22: Heinisch vs. Perez
- Promotion: Legacy Fighting Alliance
- Date: September 8, 2017
- Venue: 1stBank Center
- City: Broomfield, Colorado, U.S.

Event chronology
Legacy Fighting Alliance 21: Noblitt vs. Branjão	Legacy Fighting Alliance 22: Heinisch vs. Perez	Legacy Fighting Alliance 23: Krantz vs. Nakashima

Legacy Fighting Alliance 22: Heinisch vs. Perez was the twenty-third event of Legacy Fighting Alliance and took place on September 8, 2017. It aired on AXS TV.

Results

Main Card
Weight class				Method	Round	Time	Notes
Middleweight	Markus Perez	def.	Ian Heinisch	Submission (arm-triangle choke)	1	2:14	(Note: For the vacant LFA Middleweight Championship.)
Middleweight	Gilbert Smith	def.	Ben Smith	Submission (guillotine choke)	2	4:16
Bantamweight	Chris Gutiérrez	def.	Mario Israel	Decision (split)	3	5:00
Featherweight	Derek Brenon	def.	Boimah Karmo	Decision (unanimous)	3	5:00
Flyweight	Brandon Royval	def.	Demetrius Wilson	Submission (triangle choke)	2	2:00
Women's Strawweight	Maycee Barber	def.	Mallory Martin	Decision (unanimous)	3	5:00
Lightweight	Jonathan Wyderko	def.	Juan Gonzalez	TKO (knees and punches)	2	0:52
Preliminary Card
Featherweight	Youssef Zalal	def.	Maurice Salazar	TKO (punches)	2	4:41

=== Legacy Fighting Alliance 23: Krantz vs. Nakashima ===
Legacy Fighting Alliance 23: Krantz vs. Nakashima
- Promotion: Legacy Fighting Alliance
- Date: September 22, 2017
- Venue: Horseshoe Bossier City Hotel and Casino
- City: Bossier City, Louisiana, U.S.

Event chronology
Legacy Fighting Alliance 22: Heinisch vs. Perez	Legacy Fighting Alliance 23: Krantz vs. Nakashima	Legacy Fighting Alliance 24: Frincu vs. Millender

Legacy Fighting Alliance 23: Krantz vs. Nakashima was the twenty-fourth event of Legacy Fighting Alliance and took place on September 22, 2017. It aired on AXS TV.

Results

Main Card
Weight class				Method	Round	Time	Notes
Welterweight	James Nakashima	def.	Derrick Krantz (c)	Decision (split)	5	5:00	(Note: For the LFA Welterweight Championship.)
Women's Flyweight	Andrea Lee (c)	def.	Jamie Thorton	Submission (kimura)	2	2:54	(Note: For the LFA Women's Flyweight Championship.)
Light Heavyweight	Ryan Spann	def.	LeMarcus Tucker	Submission (rear-naked choke)	2	2:55
Catchweight (157 lbs)	Bryan Billiot	def.	Brandon Shavers	Submission (heel hook)	2	3:07
Women's Flyweight	Sabina Mazo	def.	Linsey Williams	KO (head kick)	1	4:26
Featherweight	Peter Stanonik	def.	Kendrick Williams	KO (punch)	2	4:18
Preliminary Card
Strawweight	Zach Albritton	def.	Berto Grimaldo	KO (punch)	2	3:38
Lightweight	Spencer Flores	def.	Ariel Jaurez	Submission (armbar)	1	1:57
Amateur Bouts
Featherweight	Jeb Ross	def.	Caleb Minter	Decision (unanimous)	3	3:00
Bantamweight	Latrell Normandin	def.	Jake Foster	Decision (unanimous)	3	3:00
Women's Bantamweight	Victoria Leonardo	def.	Cora Wilson	Decision (unanimous)	3	3:00
Postliminary Card
Catchweight (177 lbs)	Nick Jackson	def.	Brandon Martin	Submission (rear-naked choke)	2	3:23

=== Legacy Fighting Alliance 24: Frincu vs. Millender ===
Legacy Fighting Alliance 24: Frincu vs. Millender
- Promotion: Legacy Fighting Alliance
- Date: October 13, 2017
- Venue: Comerica Theater
- City: Phoenix, Arizona, U.S.

Event chronology
Legacy Fighting Alliance 23: Krantz vs. Nakashima	Legacy Fighting Alliance 24: Frincu vs. Millender	Legacy Fighting Alliance 25: Cochrane vs. Rodrigues

Legacy Fighting Alliance 24: Frincu vs. Millender was the twenty-fifth event of Legacy Fighting Alliance and took place on October 13, 2017. It aired on AXS TV.

Results

Main Card
Weight class				Method	Round	Time	Notes
Welterweight	Curtis Millender	def.	Matthew Frincu	KO (head kick)	1	0:38
Bantamweight	Vinicius Zani	def.	Joey Miolla	Decision (unanimous)	3	5:00
Women's Flyweight	Mackenzie Dern	def.	Mandy Polk	Submission (rear-naked choke)	1	2:55
Lightweight	LaRue Burley	def.	Maycon Mendonça	Decision (unanimous)	3	5:00
Featherweight	Cory Sandhagen	def.	Toninho Gavinho	TKO (punches)	1	3:00
Bantamweight	Glen Baker	def.	Kevin Natividad	KO (punches)	1	0:09
Lightweight	Keoni Diggs	def.	Nick Chasteen	Submission (kneebar)	3	1:53
Preliminary Card
Lightweight	Manny Villarreal	def.	Anthony Martinez	Decision (split)	3	5:00

=== Legacy Fighting Alliance 25: Cochrane vs. Rodrigues ===
Legacy Fighting Alliance 25: Cochrane vs. Rodrigues
- Promotion: Legacy Fighting Alliance
- Date: October 20, 2017
- Venue: Ralston Arena
- City: Ralston, Nebraska, U.S.

Event chronology
Legacy Fighting Alliance 24: Frincu vs. Millender	Legacy Fighting Alliance 25: Cochrane vs. Rodrigues	Legacy Fighting Alliance 26: Odoms vs. Hughes

Legacy Fighting Alliance 25: Cochrane vs. Rodrigues was the twenty-sixth event of Legacy Fighting Alliance and took place on October 20, 2017. It aired on AXS TV.

Results

Main Card
Weight class				Method	Round	Time	Notes
Welterweight	Dakota Cochrane	def.	Ciro Rodrigues	Decision (split)	3	5:00
Featherweight	Fernando Padilla	def.	Darrick Minner	Submission (triangle-armbar)	1	3:10
Welterweight	Kassius Holdorf	def.	Jordon Larson	TKO (punches)	2	0:46
Bantamweight	Emeka Ifekandu	def.	Michael Graves	Decision (unanimous)	3	5:00
Bantamweight	Dwight Joseph	def.	Steven Merrill	Decision (unanimous)	3	5:00
Welterweight	Matt Delanoit	def.	Sultan Umar	Decision (split)	3	5:00
Welterweight	Willie Whitehead	def.	Virgil Knight	Submission (strikes)	3	3:51
Preliminary Card (Amateur Bouts)
Featherweight	Keilen Fantroy	def.	Kaleb Neugin	KO (punch)	1	0:15
Bantamweight	Michael Aquila	def.	Ashton Caniglia	Submission (armbar)	1	0:55
Middleweight	Jeff Souder	def.	Ryan Leininger	Decision (unanimous)	3	3:00
Welterweight	Haris Talundzic	def.	Patrick Taylor	TKO (punches)	1	0:27
Lightweight	Brandon Meyer	def.	Ben Wallingford	Submission (rear-naked choke)	2	2:18
Middleweight	Rowan Stander	def.	Justice Bridgeford	TKO (retirement)	1	3:00
Welterweight	Keyes Nelson	def.	Jack Freriks	Submission (guillotine choke)	1	2:38

=== Legacy Fighting Alliance 26: Odoms vs. Hughes ===
Legacy Fighting Alliance 26: Odoms vs. Hughes
- Promotion: Legacy Fighting Alliance
- Date: November 3, 2017
- Venue: Arena Theatre
- City: Houston, Texas, U.S.

Event chronology
Legacy Fighting Alliance 25: Cochrane vs. Rodrigues	Legacy Fighting Alliance 26: Odoms vs. Hughes	Legacy Fighting Alliance 27: Watley vs. Wilson

Legacy Fighting Alliance 26: Odoms vs. Hughes was the twenty-seventh event of Legacy Fighting Alliance and took place on November 3, 2017. It aired on AXS TV.

Results

Main Card
Weight class				Method	Round	Time	Notes
Heavyweight	Jeff Hughes	def.	Richard Odoms (c)	Decision (unanimous)	5	5:00	(Note: For the LFA Heavyweight Championship.)
Middleweight	Larry Crowe	def.	Bilal Williams	Decision (split)	3	5:00
Featherweight	Charles Cheeks III	def.	Westin Wilson	Submission (armbar)	2	4:04
Women's Strawweight	Nicolle Caliari	def.	Itzel Esquivel	TKO (punches)	2	3:56
Heavyweight	Juan Adams	def.	Brice Ritani-Coe	TKO (punches)	1	1:33
Bantamweight	Adrian Yañez	def.	Trent Meaux	Decision (unanimous)	3	5:00
Welterweight	Jason Langellier	def.	Nicholas Gay	Decision (unanimous)	3	5:00
Preliminary Card
Welterweight	Charlie Ontiveros	def.	Clovis Hancock	TKO (punches)	2	2:43
Featherweight	Omar Hillail	def.	Dustin Parman	Technical Submission (rear-naked choke)	3	1:00
Catchweight (165 lbs)	Jacob Capelli	def.	David Armas	Decision (unanimous)	3	5:00
Bantamweight	Leomana Martinez	def.	Eric Hendon	TKO (punches)	2	2:00

=== Legacy Fighting Alliance 27: Watley vs. Wilson ===
Legacy Fighting Alliance 27: Watley vs. Wilson
- Promotion: Legacy Fighting Alliance
- Date: November 10, 2017
- Venue: Firelake Arena
- City: Shawnee, Oklahoma, U.S.

Event chronology
Legacy Fighting Alliance 26: Odoms vs. Hughes	Legacy Fighting Alliance 27: Watley vs. Wilson	Legacy Fighting Alliance 28: Jackson vs. Luna

Legacy Fighting Alliance 27: Watley vs. Wilson was the twenty-eighth event of Legacy Fighting Alliance and took place on November 10, 2017. It aired on AXS TV.

Results

Main Card
Weight class				Method	Round	Time	Notes
Lightweight	Robert Watley (c)	def.	Daryl Wilson	TKO (punches)	3	4:32	(Note: For the LFA Lightweight Championship.)
Light Heavyweight	Ryan Spann	def.	Myron Dennis	KO (punches)	1	3:08
Lightweight	Alexander Hernandez	def.	Derrick Adkins	TKO (punches)	3	1:53
Flyweight	Kendrick Latchman	def.	Tyler Shinn	Decision (unanimous)	3	5:00
Catchweight (195 lbs)	Ed Cline Jr.	def.	Levi Queen	Submission (guillotine choke)	3	2:11
Lightweight	Kyle Driscoll	def.	Ken Coulter	Decision (unanimous)	3	5:00
Preliminary Card
Featherweight	Chris Mullins	def.	Craig Campbell	Decision (majority)	3	5:00
Featherweight	Daniel Carey	def.	Diego Pichilingue	Decision (unanimous)	3	5:00
Amateur Bouts
Welterweight	Jared McLoughlin	def.	Cale Bryant	Submission (triangle choke)	1	2:02
Middleweight	Chase King	def.	Donte McKenzie	TKO (strikes)	1	2:53
Bantamweight	Nathan Ryan	def.	Mike Hoover	Decision (unanimous)	3	3:00

=== Legacy Fighting Alliance 28: Jackson vs. Luna ===
Legacy Fighting Alliance 28: Jackson vs. Luna
- Promotion: Legacy Fighting Alliance
- Date: December 8, 2017
- Venue: The Bomb Factory
- City: Dallas, Texas, U.S.

Event chronology
Legacy Fighting Alliance 27: Watley vs. Wilson	Legacy Fighting Alliance 28: Jackson vs. Luna	Legacy Fighting Alliance 29: Camus vs. Simón

Legacy Fighting Alliance 28: Jackson vs. Luna was the twenty-ninth event of Legacy Fighting Alliance and took place on December 8, 2017. It aired on AXS TV.

Results

Main Card
Weight class				Method	Round	Time	Notes
Lightweight	Damon Jackson	def.	Luis Luna	Submission (rear-naked choke)	1	4:58
Light Heavyweight	Alonzo Menifield	def.	Otavio Lacerda	TKO (punches)	2	0:32
Catchweight (140 lbs)	Miles Johns	def.	Caio Machado	Decision (unanimous)	3	5:00
Bantamweight	Steven Peterson	def.	Dustin Winter	TKO (punches)	2	2:38
Welterweight	Nikolay Veretennikov	def.	Melvin Jordan	TKO (punches)	1	2:00
Catchweight (175 lbs)	Ramiz Brahimaj	def.	Ben Simons	Technical Submission (guillotine choke)	1	0:46
Flyweight	Ricky Esquibel	def.	Cameron Miller	Submission (rear-naked choke)	1	4:21
Preliminary Card (Amateur Bouts)
Flyweight	Xavier Franklin	def.	Anthony Huynh	Decision (unanimous)	3	3:00
Middleweight	Joseph Holmes	def.	David Hansen	Decision (split)	3	3:00
Flyweight	Steven Orozco	def.	Kevin Fernandez	Decision (split)	3	3:00
Lightweight	Edgardo Guzman	def.	Gabriel Calvario	Decision (unanimous)	3	3:00
Postliminary Card
Flyweight	Victor Altamirano	def.	Jesus Martinez	Submission (heel hook)	1	3:04
Bantamweight	Devin Miller	def.	Manuel Corral	Submission (rear-naked choke)	1	3:20

=== Legacy Fighting Alliance 29: Camus vs. Simón ===
Legacy Fighting Alliance 29: Camus vs. Simón
- Promotion: Legacy Fighting Alliance
- Date: December 15, 2017
- Venue: Mystic Lake Casino Hotel
- City: Prior Lake, Minnesota, U.S.

Event chronology
Legacy Fighting Alliance 28: Jackson vs. Luna	Legacy Fighting Alliance 29: Camus vs. Simón	Legacy Fighting Alliance 30: Millender vs. Barnes

Legacy Fighting Alliance 29: Camus vs. Simón was the thirtieth event of Legacy Fighting Alliance and took on December 15, 2017. It aired on AXS TV.

Results

Main Card
Weight class				Method	Round	Time	Notes
Bantamweight	Ricky Simón	def.	Chico Camus	Decision (unanimous)	5	5:00	(Note: For the vacant LFA Bantamweight Championship.)
Lightweight	Jeff Peterson	def.	Mike Richman	Decision (unanimous)	3	5:00
Featherweight	Nate Jennerman	def.	Sam Toomer	Submission (arm-triangle choke)	2	2:41
Welterweight	Jason Witt	def.	Ty Freeman	Decision (unanimous)	3	5:00
Lightweight	Brandon Jenkins	def.	Carl Wittstock	Decision (unanimous)	3	5:00
Light Heavyweight	Cameron Olson	der.	Jaquis Williams	Submission (rear-naked choke)	2	2:52
Middleweight	Alton Cunningham	def.	Dominic Garcia	TKO (punches)	1	4:58
Preliminary Card
Lightweight	Ashkan Morvari	def.	Damion Shehan	TKO (punches)	2	1:55
Amateur Bouts
Middleweight	Billy Simon	def.	Rodney Nash	Decision (unanimous)	3	3:00
Women's Featherweight	Akeela Al-Hameed	def.	Laura Sanchez	Decision (unanimous)	3	3:00
Welterweight	Juan Hernandez	def.	Yamah Sadozai	Decision (unanimous)	3	3:00
Lightweight	Coty Milhausen	def.	Micah John	KO (punch)	1	2:54
Featherweight	Zachary Buros-Nash	def.	Bryan Bautista	Decision (unanimous)	3	3:00
