= 2011 in Cage Warriors =

Mixed martial arts events

Information
- First date: February 26, 2011
- Last date: October 1, 2011

Events
- Total events: 7

Fights
- Total fights: 91

Chronology
2010 in Cage Warriors	2011 in Cage Warriors	2012 in Cage Warriors

The year 2011 is the 10th year in the history of Cage Warriors, a mixed martial arts promotion based in the United Kingdom. In 2011 Cage Rage Championships held 7 events beginning with, Cage Warriors: 40.

== Events list ==
#	Event title	Date	Venue	Location
46	Cage Warriors: 44	October 1, 2011	The Forum	London, England
45	Cage Warriors: Fight Night 2	September 8, 2011	The New Boxing Arena	Amman, Jordan
44	Cage Warriors: 43	July 9, 2011	The Forum	London, England
43	Cage Warriors: Fight Night 1	June 16, 2011	Le Royal Hotel (Amman)	Amman, Jordan
42	Cage Warriors: 42	May 28, 2011	Neptune Stadium	Cork, Ireland
41	Cage Warriors: 41	April 24, 2011	The Forum	London, England
40	Cage Warriors: 40	February 26, 2011	The Forum	London, England

== Cage Warriors: 40 ==
Cage Warriors: 40 was an event held on February 26, 2011 in London, England.

=== Results ===
Main Card
Weight class				Method	Round	Time	Notes
	Rosi Sexton	def.	Roxanne Modafferi	Decision (Unanimous)	3	5:00
	Paul McVeigh	def.	Andreas Bernhard	TKO (Punches)	2	2:57
	Joseph Duffy	def.	Tom Maguire	Submission (Triangle Choke)	1	4:47
	Graham Turner	def.	Antanas Jazbutis	Decision (Unanimous)	3	5:00
	Tony Machado	def.	Brett Sizeland	TKO (Punches)	1	2:18
	Ashleigh Grimshaw	def.	Ismael Padavia	Decision (Unanimous)	3	5:00
	Arni Isaksson	def.	Kevin Reed	Submission (Arm-Triangle Choke)	2	2:32
	Brad Wheeler	def.	Hayden Critchfield	Submission (Rear-Naked Choke)	1	2:58
	Ian Entwistle	def.	Patrick Vickers	Technical Submission (Guillotine Choke)	1	0:20
	Aaron Thomas	def.	Charlie Leary	Submission (Armbar)	2	4:57
	Mark Fry	def.	Paul Kingdon	TKO (Punches)	2	2:43
	Matt Wise	def.	Robert Kwietniewski	Decision (Unanimous)	3	3:00
	Ben Hajir	def.	Josh Foster	Submission (Rear-Naked Choke)	3	2:31
	Jack Bramfield	def.	Theo Michailidis	Decision (Unanimous)	3	3:00

== Cage Warriors: 41 ==
Cage Warriors: 41 was an event held on April 24, 2011 in London, England.

=== Results ===
Main Card
Weight class				Method	Round	Time	Notes
	Jack Mason	def.	Allan Love	Decision (Unanimous)	3	5:00
	Sheila Gaff	def.	Aisling Daly	TKO (Knees and Punches)	1	1:34
	Warren Kee	vs.	John Quinn	Draw (Unanimous)	3	5:00
	Ian Entwistle	def.	Brad Wheeler	DQ (Punches to Back of Head)	1	4:00
	Linton Vassell	def.	Simon Carlsen	Decision (Unanimous)	3	5:00
	Jack Hermansson	def.	Ali Arish	KO (Punch and Head Kick)	2	1:39
	Ashleigh Grimshaw	def.	Patrick Peresa	TKO (Punches)	1	1:38
	Niklas Backstrom	def.	Adam Edwards	Decision (Unanimous)	3	5:00
	Craig White	def.	Dan Edwards	Submission (Triangle Choke)	1	4:25
	Artem Lobov	def.	Dave Hill	Decision (Unanimous)	3	5:00
	Dean Reilly	def.	Josh Ramage	Decision (Unanimous)	3	5:00
	Damien Forgie	def.	Chian Kocer	Submission (Rear-Naked Choke)	2	4:39
	Oliver Battell	def.	Ben Rees	Decision (Unanimous)	3	3:00
	Ben Sullivan	def.	Ray Selby	TKO (Punches)	3	2:27

== Cage Warriors: 42 ==
Cage Warriors: 42 was an event held on May 28, 2011 in Cork, Ireland.

=== Results ===
Main Card
Weight class				Method	Round	Time	Notes
	Joseph Duffy	def.	Oriol Gaset	TKO (Punches)	1	2:46
	Jake Hecht	def.	Craig White	Submission (North-South Choke)	2	4:58
	Cathal Pendred	def.	Vladimir Malko	TKO (Punches)	2	3:14
	Chris Fields	def.	Mario Stapel	TKO (Leg Injury)	3	0:36
	Tim Newman	def.	Grzegorz Tredowski	KO (Punch)	1	0:10
	Tom Maguire	def.	Patrick Vickers	Submission (Guillotine Choke)	2	2:40
	Tom Sullivan	def.	Yuri Malko	TKO (Corner Stoppage)	2	5:00
	Kevin Donnelly	def.	Kieran Malone	TKO (Punches)	2	1:17
	Wojciech Antczak	def.	Michael Kukowski	Submission (Guillotine Choke)	1	1:17
	John Michael Sheil	def.	Marek Piekarski	TKO (Punches)	1	1:48
	Sean Tobin	def.	Dylan Sheehan	Decision (Unanimous)	3	3:00
	James Heelan	def.	Liam Og-Griffin	TKO (Punches)	1	2:00
	Shane Marum	vs.	Darren Geasley	Draw	3	3:00

== Cage Warriors: Fight Night 1 ==
Cage Warriors: Fight Night 1 was an event held on June 16, 2011 in Amman, Jordan.

=== Results ===
Main Card
Weight class				Method	Round	Time	Notes
	Andreas Kraniotakes	def.	Jay Mortimore	TKO (Punches)	1	4:14
	Jake Hecht	def.	Michele Verginelli	Decision (Unanimous)	3	5:00
	Jean N'Doye	def.	Dan Hope	TKO (Punches)	3	3:55
	Dave Keeley	def.	Joel Wyatt	KO (Elbows)	1	2:50
	John Michael Sheil	def.	Victor Cheng	TKO (Punch)	3	0:47
	Leon Del Gaudio	def.	Patrick Vickers	Decision (Unanimous)	3	5:00
	Mohammad Sarsar	def.	Yazan Janeb	TKO (Punches)	2	2:07
	Mohamed Ali	def.	Saanouni Makrem	Decision (Unanimous)	3	3:00
	Ihab Janeb	def.	Eslam Salama	Submission (Guillotine Choke)	1	1:47
	Timoor Narmeq	def.	Radwan Meri	Submission (Rear-Naked Choke)	1	1:36
	Jalal Deaja	vs.	Ahmad Sayed Hassan	Draw	3	3:00
	Assad Wasfi	def.	Abdel Kareem Teshroun	Submission (Guillotine Choke)	3	3:00
	Thabet Agha	def.	Mohammad Youssef	Submission (Rear-Naked Choke)	2	1:07

== Cage Warriors: 43 ==
Cage Warriors: 43 was an event held on July 9, 2011 in London, England.

=== Results ===
Main Card
Weight class				Method	Round	Time	Notes
	Norman Paraisy	def.	Jack Mason	TKO (Flying Knee and Elbows)	3	3:50
	Joseph Duffy	def.	Francis Heagney	Decision (Unanimous)	3	5:00
	Brad Wheeler	def.	Ian Entwistle	Submission (Reverse Triangle Choke)	1	3:22
	Andreas Kraniotakes	def.	Dave Keeley	Submission (Armbar)	1	3:48
	Brett Sizeland	def.	Craig White	Submission (Rear-Naked Choke)	1	4:15
	Steve O'Keefe	def.	Artem Lobov	Technical Submission (Rear-Naked Choke)	3	1:24
	Adam Edwards	def.	Ben Crook	Submission (Armbar)	1	1:07
	Olivier Pastor	def.	Niko Gjoka	TKO (Punches)	3	2:17
	Danny Roberts	def.	David Howell	TKO (Knee to the Body)	2	2:26
	Dave Smith	def.	Matt Wise	Decision (Majority)	3	3:00
	Adam Brearley	def.	Doug Wibberly	TKO (Punches)	1	1:04
	Ben Hajir	def.	Ben Rees	Submission (Armbar)	1	1:35
	Charlie Watts	def.	Courtney Anderson	Decision (Unanimous)	3	3:00

== Cage Warriors: Fight Night 2 ==
Cage Warriors: Fight Night 2 was an event held on September 8, 2011 in Amman, Jordan.

=== Results ===
Main Card
Weight class				Method	Round	Time	Notes
	Gael Grimaud	def.	Arni Isaksson	TKO (Punches)	2	4:14
	Jack Hermansson	def.	Mike Ling	KO (Punches)	1	3:30
	Aisling Daly	def.	Angela Hayes	Submission (Armbar)	1	0:20
	Danny Mitchell	vs.	Cathal Pendred	Draw	3	5:00
	James Saville	def.	Zac Stratton	Submission (Triangle Choke)	1	0:46
	Conor McGregor	def.	Aaron Jahnsen	TKO (Punches)	1	3:29
	Merv Mulholland	def.	Amir Gerandokov	Submission (Rear-Naked Choke)	1	2:30
	Ihab Janeb	def.	Mohamed Ali	DQ (Knee to Head of Grounded Opponent)	1	3:02
	Yousef Abu Shreekh	def.	Hassan Burham	TKO (Punches)	1	0:51
	Wael Korked	def.	Mohammad Wasfi	TKO (Punches)	1	1:40
	Walid Nessib	def.	Thabet Agha	Submission (Kimura)	1	1:59
	Motasem Al-Tahrawi	def.	Mahmood Abdelkader	TKO (Punches)	3	2:18
	Yazan Janeb	def.	Hassan Talal	Submission (Armbar)	1	0:44
	Basel Narmouq	def.	Abdel Kareem Teshroun	TKO (Leg Kicks)	3	0:58

== Cage Warriors: 44 ==
Cage Warriors: 44 was an event held on October 1, 2011 in London, England.

=== Results ===
Main Card
Weight class				Method	Round	Time	Notes
	Ivan Musardo	def.	Joseph Duffy	Submission (Guillotine Choke)	4	4:25
	Brian Foster	def.	Jack Mason	Submission (Guillotine Choke)	1	2:15
	Graham Turner	def.	Ashleigh Grimshaw	Decision (Split)	3	5:00
	Brad Wheeler	def.	Kevin Donnelly	Submission (Rear-Naked Choke)	3	1:51
	Dayman Lake	def.	Rab Truesdale	Submission (Arm-Triangle Choke)	1	1:24
	Steve O'Keefe	def.	Dean Reilly	Submission (Arm-Triangle Choke)	1	0:54
	Neil Seery	def.	Niko Gjoka	KO (Punches)	2	4:04
	David Howell	def.	Kieran Malone	TKO (Elbows)	1	2:19
	Charlie Watts	def.	Tye Palmer	Decision (Unanimous)	3	3:00
	Adam Brearley	def.	Ben Reid	TKO (Punches)	2	0:32

== See also ==
- Cage Warriors
