= Cliff Wright (fighter) =

American mixed martial arts fighter

- Born: January 22, 1979 (age 47); Iowa City, Iowa, United States
- Other names: The Goblin
- Height: 5 ft 11 in (1.80 m)
- Weight: 170 lb (77 kg; 12 st)
- Division: Welterweight; Lightweight; Featherweight
- Reach: 71 in (180 cm)
- Fighting out of: Cedar Rapids, Iowa, United States
- Team: Hard Drive Mixed Martial Arts
- Years active: 2008–present

Mixed martial arts record
- Total: 33
- Wins: 12
- By knockout: 1
- By submission: 11
- Losses: 21
- By knockout: 3
- By submission: 7
- By decision: 11

Other information
- Mixed martial arts record from Sherdog

Cliff Wright Jr. (born January 22, 1979) is an American mixed martial artist currently competing in the Welterweight division. A professional since 2008, he has fought in Bellator MMA.

== Mixed martial arts career ==
=== Early career ===
From September 2008 to March 2012, Wright compiled a record of 6–2 before debuting for Bellator.

=== Bellator MMA ===
Wright made his Bellator debut on May 18, 2012, at Bellator 69 against Josh Quayhagen, losing via unanimous decision.

Wright faced Bobby Reardanz at Bellator 75 on October 5, 2012. He won via rear-naked choke submission in round one.

Wright then faced Christian Uflacker at Bellator 84 on December 14, 2012. He lost via technical unanimous decision after an upkick delivered by Wright was determined to be illegal by the referee, rendering Uflacker unable to continue.

Wright fought Donald Sanchez at Bellator 97 on July 31, 2013. He lost the bout via split decision.

Wright faced Derek Loffer on October 18, 2013, at Bellator 104. He won via armbar submission in the second round.

Wright fought LaRue Burley at Bellator 117 on April 18, 2014, and lost via unanimous decision.

== Mixed martial arts record ==
Professional record breakdown
33 matches	12 wins	21 losses
By knockout	1	3
By submission	11	7
By decision	0	11
Draws	0	

Res.	Record	Opponent	Method	Event	Date	Round	Time	Location	Notes
Loss	12–19	Austin Judge	TKO (punches)	LFA 157	April 21, 2023	1	3:57	Prior Lake, Minnesota, United States	Catchweight (165 lb) bout.
Loss	12–20	Marshall Kemp	Submission (rear-naked choke)	Fight Hard MMA: Springfield Fight Night 2	May 21, 2022	1	1:37	Springfield, Missouri, United States	Catchweight (160 lb) bout.
Loss	12–19	Gauge Young	Submission (arm-triangle choke)	FAC 10	October 8, 2021	1	3:18	Independence, Missouri, United States	Lightweight bout.
Loss	12–18	William Starks	Submission (rear-naked choke)	Midwest Fight League	August 14, 2021	2	3:06	Columbia, Missouri, United States	
Loss	12–17	Brok Weaver	TKO (punches)	Gamebred Fighting Championships 1	June 19, 2021	2	2:38	Biloxi, Mississippi, United States	Bare Knuckle MMA.
Loss	12–16	Chance Rencountre	Submission (rear-naked choke)	FAC 8	May 7, 2021	1	4:58	Kansas City, Missouri, United States	Welterweight bout.
Loss	12–15	Jason Knight	Submission (rear-naked choke)	iKon Fighting Federation 5	March 5, 2021	2	1:48	Biloxi, Mississippi, United States	
Loss	12–14	Khasan Askhabov	Submission (rear-naked choke)	iKon Fighting Federation 1	September 24, 2020	2	2:24	Biloxi, Mississippi, United States	
Loss	12–13	Brian Foster	Submission (kimura)	MMAX FC 9: High Stakes 2	August 15, 2020	1	2:20	Poteau, Oklahoma, United States	
Win	12–12	Thomas Gifford	KO (punch)	Pyramid Fights 15	February 29, 2020	1	0:33	Benton, Arkansas, United States	Return to Lightweight.
Loss	11–12	Jason Witt	Decision (unanimous)	Kansas City Fighting Alliance 34: Fight 4 The Troops	July 27, 2019	3	5:00	Independence, Missouri, United States	
Win	11–11	Kevin Brown Jr.	Submission (rear-naked choke)	Walkout FC 15	April 20, 2019	1	1:16	Rogers, Arkansas, United States	
Loss	10–11	Austin Hubbard	Decision (unanimous)	Caged Aggression 18: Next Level	October 8, 2016	5	5:00	Council Bluffs, Iowa, United States	For Caged Aggression Welterweight Championship.
Loss	10–10	Perry Olson	Decision (unanimous)	KOTC: Due Process	September 9, 2016	3	5:00	Carlton, Minnesota, United States	
Win	10–9	Evian Rodriguez	Submission (arm-triangle choke)	RCC: Revolution Cage Combat	June 11, 2016	1	1:55	Iowa City, Iowa, United States	Welterweight debut.
Loss	9–9	Ramiro Hernandez	Decision (unanimous)	EC: Extreme Challenge 233	May 7, 2016	5	5:00	Clinton, Iowa, United States	Catchweight (160 lbs) bout; for Extreme Challenge Lightweight Championship.
Loss	9–8	Robert Rojas Jr.	Decision (unanimous)	DCS: Spring Brawl 4	April 23, 2016	5	5:00	Lincoln, Nebraska, United States	For DCS Lightweight Championship.
Win	9–7	Tom Shoaff	Submission	TFE: Gladiators	October 17, 2015	1	3:04	Indianapolis, Indiana, United States	
Loss	8–7	Eric Wisely	Decision (unanimous)	Pinnacle Combat 21	August 21, 2015	5	5:00	Dubuque, Iowa, United States	For Pinnacle MMA Lightweight Championship.
Loss	8–6	LaRue Burley	Decision (unanimous)	Bellator 117	April 18, 2014	3	5:00	Council Bluffs, Iowa, United States	Returned to Lightweight.
Win	8–5	Derek Loffer	Submission (armbar)	Bellator 104	October 18, 2013	2	4:28	Cedar Rapids, Iowa, United States	Catchweight (160 lbs) bout.
Loss	7–5	Donald Sanchez	Decision (split)	Bellator 97	July 31, 2013	3	5:00	Rio Rancho, New Mexico, Mexico	Catchweight (148 lbs) bout; Wright missed weight.
Loss	7–4	Christian Uflacker	Technical Decision (unanimous)	Bellator 84	December 14, 2012	3	2:26	Hammond, Indiana, United States	Illegal Upkick rendered Uflacker unable to continue.
Win	7–3	Bobby Reardanz	Submission (rear-naked choke)	Bellator 75	October 5, 2012	1	3:39	Hammond, Indiana, United States	Catchweight (147 lbs) bout; Wright missed weight.
Loss	6–3	Josh Quayhagen	Decision (unanimous)	Bellator 69	May 18, 2012	3	5:00	Lake Charles, Louisiana, United States	Catchweight (158 lbs) bout.
Win	6–2	Dakota Cochrane	Technical Submission (rear-naked choke)	RFA 2: Yvel vs. Alexander	March 30, 2012	1	4:39	Kearney, Nebraska, United States	
Win	5–2	Mark Herman	Submission (choke)	Extreme Challenge 203	January 29, 2012	1	0:56	Bettendorf, Iowa, United States	
Win	4–2	Mike Lindquist	Submission (guillotine choke)	Extreme Challenge 187	July 23, 2011	1	1:08	Cedar Rapids, Iowa, United States	
Win	3–2	Drew Mehaffy	Submission (armbar)	Mainstream MMA: Swing Back	August 21, 2010	1	1:01	Cedar Rapids, Iowa, United States	
Loss	2–2	Ryan Bixler	TKO (punches)	Glory Fighting Championships 7	July 25, 2009	3	N/A	Des Moines, Iowa, United States	
Win	2–1	Jeremy Castro	Submission (triangle choke)	Pinnacle Combat MMA 2	April 25, 2009	2	1:40	Dubuque, Iowa, United States	
Loss	1–1	Mike Lullo	Decision (unanimous)	Xtreme Fighting Organization 28	February 27, 2009	3	5:00	Lakemoor, Illinois, United States	
Win	1–0	Aubrey Bailey	Submission (rear-naked choke)	Conquest Fighting Championship 1	September 27, 2008	1	1:21	Des Moines, Iowa, United States	

== Bare knuckle record ==
Professional record breakdown
1 match	0 wins	1 loss
By knockout	0	0
By decision	0	1
Draws	0	

Res.	Record	Opponent	Method	Event	Date	Round	Time	Location	Notes
Loss	0–1	David Rickels	Decision (unanimous)	BKFC 13	October 10, 2020	5	2:00	Salina, Kansas, United States	
