= Joseph Duffy (fighter) =

Irish mixed martial arts (MMA) fighter

Joseph Duffy Seosamh Ó Dubhthaigh
- Born: 18 February 1988 (age 38); County Donegal, Ireland
- Other names: Irish Joe
- Height: 5 ft 10 in (1.78 m)
- Weight: 155 lb (70 kg; 11 st 1 lb)
- Division: Lightweight; Welterweight
- Reach: 73 in (185 cm)
- Stance: Orthodox
- Fighting out of: Donegal, Ireland
- Team: Tristar Gym
- Rank: Black belt in Taekwondo under Heath Gait; Black belt in Ju-Jitsu under Heath Gait; Purple belt in Brazilian Jiu-Jitsu under Firas Zahabi
- Years active: 2008–2021

Professional boxing record
- Total: 7
- Wins: 7
- By knockout: 2
- Losses: 0

Kickboxing record
- Total: 2
- Wins: 2
- Losses: 0

Mixed martial arts record
- Total: 21
- Wins: 16
- By knockout: 4
- By submission: 10
- By decision: 2
- Losses: 5
- By knockout: 1
- By submission: 2
- By decision: 2

Amateur record
- Total: 2
- Wins: 2
- By submission: 2

Other information
- Boxing record from BoxRec
- Mixed martial arts record from Sherdog

Joseph Duffy (born 18 February 1988) is an Irish retired mixed martial artist who competed in the lightweight division of the Ultimate Fighting Championship (UFC). A professional since 2008, he has formerly competed for Cage Warriors and was a contestant on The Ultimate Fighter: Team GSP vs. Team Koscheck. He is also a former professional boxer. He holds a notable victory over the former UFC lightweight and featherweight double-champion, Conor McGregor.

== Early life ==
Duffy is from Meenbanad, Burtonport, County Donegal. His family emigrated when he was young to the industrial town of Ebbw Vale in Wales, from where they travelled back and forth to Burtonport regularly.

Duffy is an avid rugby fan, and growing up he says "I would always have made it known I wasn’t from Wales", which made his support for Ireland during the Six Nations a bit difficult sometimes. He claimed "if Ireland lost in the rugby, I would try to skip the next day at school, just to avoid the hassle it would bring". Duffy also played the sport through his youth, and despite captaining his school's rugby team, it was martial arts that always occupied the majority of Duffy's time. He started with taekwon-do before progressing to traditional jiu-jitsu, a foundation that eventually led him to a career in professional MMA.

== Boxing career ==
Despite knowing from an early age that he wanted to be a MMA fighter, Duffy said "I always wondered how I would get on in boxing". He continued "it was never something I thought about pursuing. I had never boxed, even at amateur, until a few years ago". Duffy cited "the opportunity to work with one of the best coaches in the boxing world" as the main reason for his switch, and the chance "to spar with some of the best fighters in the world; James DeGale, Andy Lee, George Groves, Chris Eubank, Jr.", something he deemed "priceless". The decision was then made even easier, with Duffy explaining "I was fortunate enough to have sponsors to back me as well. That took care of the financial worries".

When reflecting on the experience, he stated "More than anything, I’m a person who doesn’t want to have any regrets. When I’m old I want to be able to say that I gave it a go. That’s what it was. I got to fight professionally and I got to spar with some of the best fighters in the world".

== Mixed martial arts career ==
Duffy started his career as a welterweight, fighting in various regional promotions across the UK and Ireland. Duffy defeated the former UFC two-division champion, Conor McGregor, and Northern Irishman Norman Parke, who later went on to the join the UFC. It was after this fight that Duffy signed with Cage Warriors, the biggest MMA promotion in Europe.

=== The Ultimate Fighter ===
In February 2010, Duffy was announced as a cast member of The Ultimate Fighter 12 where he competed as a lightweight. In his first fight, Duffy lost to Kyle Watson via rear-naked choke in the first round, and was subsequently eliminated from the show.

=== Cage Warriors Fighting Championship ===
Duffy made his name and rose to prominence while fighting under the CWFC banner. In his first bout with the promotion, Duffy submitted Conor McGregor, another Irish fighter who went on to UFC stardom.

In 2011, Duffy earned a Cage Warriors title shot against Ivan Musardo. Duffy lost the fight, breaking his hand in the third round, and being subsequently submitted in the fourth.

Following his recovery, Duffy switched his attention to pro boxing. He amassed a 7–0 record before returning to Cage Warriors in 2014. Duffy's first fight back was against Frenchman, Damien Lapilus. Duffy won via rear-naked choke, 2 minutes and 18 seconds into the third round.

Three months later he defeated another Frenchman, Julien Boussuge. This time detecting his opponent's intention for a takedown, and connecting a clean knee to the head when Boussuge changed levels. It was an instant knockout.

=== Ultimate Fighting Championship ===
In January 2015, the UFC announced they had signed Duffy.

Duffy was expected to make his promotional debut against Vagner Rocha on 14 March 2015 at UFC 185. However, Rocha pulled out of the bout in early February citing injury and was replaced by Jake Lindsey. Duffy won the fight via TKO in the first round after wobbling his opponent with a head kick and then dropping Lindsey with a body shot, forcing the stoppage.

Duffy faced Ivan Jorge on 18 July 2015 at UFC Fight Night 72. He won the fight via submission in the first round. He also earned a Performance of the Night bonus.

Duffy was expected to face Dustin Poirier on 24 October 2015 at UFC Fight Night 76. However, Duffy pulled out of the fight on 21 October citing a concussion he incurred during a sparring session. In turn, the pairing was rescheduled, and took place on 2 January 2016 at UFC 195. Duffy lost the fight by unanimous decision (30–26, 30–27, 30–27).

Duffy next faced Mitch Clarke on 7 July 2016 at UFC Fight Night 90. He won the fight via submission in the opening minute of the first round.

Duffy faced Reza Madadi on 18 March 2017 at UFC Fight Night 107. He won the fight by unanimous decision.

On 13 July 2017, Duffy's manager Graham Boylan revealed Duffy had signed a new seven-fight contract with UFC.

Duffy faced James Vick on 4 November 2017 at UFC 217. He lost the fight via TKO in the second round.

Duffy was expected to face Ross Pearson on 2 December 2018 at UFC Fight Night 142. However, Pearson announced on 7 November that he was out of the bout due to a broken nose and subsequent surgery to correct the injury. and he was replaced by newcomer M-1 Global Lightweight Champion Damir Ismagulov. In turn Duffy pulled out from the event, citing a rib injury.

Duffy faced Marc Diakiese on 16 March 2019 at UFC Fight Night 147. He lost the fight by unanimous decision.

Duffy faced Joel Álvarez on 19 July 2020 at UFC Fight Night 172. He lost the fight via a guillotine choke in round one. After the fight, Duffy announced his retirement from MMA competition.

== Championships and accomplishments ==
- Ultimate Fighting Championship
  - Performance of the Night (One time) vs. Ivan Jorge
  - UFC.com Awards
    - 2015: Ranked #4 Newcomer of the Year & Ranked #7 Submission of the Year vs. Ivan Jorge
- MMA Junkie
  - Submission of the Month - July 2015 vs. Ivan Jorge

== Mixed martial arts record ==
Professional record breakdown
21 matches	16 wins	5 losses
By knockout	4	1
By submission	10	2
By decision	2	2

Res.	Record	Opponent	Method	Event	Date	Round	Time	Location	Notes
Loss	16–5	Joel Álvarez	Submission (guillotine choke)	UFC Fight Night: Figueiredo vs. Benavidez 2	19 July 2020	1	2:25	Abu Dhabi, United Arab Emirates	
Loss	16–4	Marc Diakiese	Decision (unanimous)	UFC Fight Night: Till vs. Masvidal	16 March 2019	3	5:00	London, England	
Loss	16–3	James Vick	TKO (punches)	UFC 217	4 November 2017	2	4:59	New York City, New York, United States	
Win	16–2	Reza Madadi	Decision (unanimous)	UFC Fight Night: Manuwa vs. Anderson	18 March 2017	3	5:00	London, England	
Win	15–2	Mitch Clarke	Submission (rear-naked choke)	UFC Fight Night: dos Anjos vs. Alvarez	7 July 2016	1	0:25	Las Vegas, Nevada, United States	
Loss	14–2	Dustin Poirier	Decision (unanimous)	UFC 195	2 January 2016	3	5:00	Las Vegas, Nevada, United States	
Win	14–1	Ivan Jorge	Submission (triangle choke)	UFC Fight Night: Bisping vs. Leites	18 July 2015	1	3:05	Glasgow, Scotland	Performance of the Night.
Win	13–1	Jake Lindsey	TKO (head kick and body punch)	UFC 185	14 March 2015	1	1:47	Dallas, Texas, United States	
Win	12–1	Julien Boussuge	KO (knee)	CWFC 74	15 November 2014	1	0:36	London, England	
Win	11–1	Damien Lapilus	Submission (rear-naked choke)	CWFC 70	16 August 2014	3	2:18	Dublin, Ireland	
Loss	10–1	Ivan Musardo	Submission (guillotine choke)	Cage Warriors 44	1 October 2011	4	4:25	Kentish Town, England	For the vacant Cage Warriors Lightweight Championship.
Win	10–0	Francis Heagney	Decision (unanimous)	Cage Warriors 43	9 July 2011	3	5:00	Kentish Town, England	
Win	9–0	Oriol Gaset	TKO (punches)	Cage Warriors 42	28 May 2011	1	2:46	Cork City, Ireland	
Win	8–0	Tom Maguire	Submission (triangle choke)	Cage Warriors 40	26 February 2011	1	4:47	Kentish Town, England	
Win	7–0	Conor McGregor	Submission (arm-triangle choke)	Cage Warriors 39	27 November 2010	1	0:38	Cork City, Ireland	
Win	6–0	Norman Parke	Submission (rear-naked choke)	Spartan Fight Challenge 3	20 March 2010	1	3:06	Newport, Wales	Lightweight debut.
Win	5–0	Sebastien Grandin	Submission (triangle choke)	KnuckleUp MMA 3	1 November 2009	1	1:36	Newport, Wales	
Win	4–0	Marius Buzinskas	Submission (rear-naked choke)	Spartan Fight Challenge 1	11 July 2009	1	N/A	Somerset, England	
Win	3–0	James Bryan	Submission (rear-naked choke)	KnuckleUp MMA 1	29 May 2009	1	1:55	Somerset, England	
Win	2–0	Ciaran Fry	Submission (triangle choke)	Angrrr Management 18: Holly Brawl	13 December 2008	1	1:24	Weston-super-Mare, England	
Win	1–0	Mick Broster	TKO (doctor stoppage)	Angrrr Management 15: The Octagon Club	29 March 2008	1	2:33	Kidderminster, England	

== Mixed martial arts exhibition and amateur record ==
Professional record breakdown
3 matches	2 wins	1 loss
By submission	2	1

Res.	Record	Opponent	Method	Event	Date	Round	Time	Location	Notes
Loss	2–1	Kyle Watson	Submission (rear-naked choke)	The Ultimate Fighter: Team GSP vs. Team Koscheck	15 September 2010 (air date)	1	3:33	Las Vegas, Nevada, United States	TUF 12 preliminary round.
Win	2–0	Adam Stanton	Submission (triangle choke)	Angrrr Management 9: Southern Agrrression 4	2 July 2006	1	1:34	Weston Super Mare, England	
Win	1–0	Tim Newman	Submission (triangle choke)	Grapple & Strike 9	21 May 2005	1	2:05	Ebbw Vale, Wales	

== Professional boxing record ==
7 fights	7 wins	0 losses
By knockout	2	0
By decision	5	0

No.	Result	Record	Opponent	Method	Round, time	Date	Location	Notes
7	Win	7–0	(Hungary) Attila Tibor Nagy	PTS	6	2013-11-22	(United Kingdom) Camden Centre, Kings Cross, London, England	
6	Win	6–0	(Romania) Ionut Trandafir Ilie	PTS	6	2013-09-07	Bärengarten, Ravensburg, Baden-Württemberg, Germany	
5	Win	5–0	(United Kingdom) Jay Morris	PTS	6	2013-07-27	(United Kingdom) York Hall, Bethnal Green, London, England	
4	Win	4–0	(United Kingdom) James Conroy	TKO	3 (4)	2013-05-11	(United Kingdom) Camden Centre, Kings Cross, London, England	
3	Win	3–0	(United Kingdom) Gilson De Jesus	PTS	4	2013-03-23	(United Kingdom) Camden Centre, Kings Cross, London, England	
2	Win	2–0	(United Kingdom) Paul Morby	TKO	2 (4)	2013-03-08	(United Kingdom) Coronet Theatre, Elephant & Castle, London, England	
1	Win	1–0	(United Kingdom) Angelo Crowe	PTS	4	2013-03-02	(United Kingdom) Oceana, Swansea, Wales	

== See also ==
- List of Irish UFC fighters
- List of current UFC fighters
- List of male mixed martial artists
- List of mixed martial artists with professional boxing records
