= Dakota Cochrane =

American mixed martial arts fighter

- Born: Dakota Galen Cochrane; May 1, 1986 (age 40); Fairbury, Nebraska, United States
- Height: 5 ft 8 in (1.73 m)
- Weight: 170 lb (77 kg; 12 st)
- Division: Welterweight (2013, 2015–present); Lightweight (2009–2015)
- Reach: 71 in (180 cm)
- Style: Boxing
- Stance: Orthodox
- Fighting out of: Omaha, Nebraska
- Team: Premier Combat Center
- Years active: 2009–present

Mixed martial arts record
- Total: 47
- Wins: 34
- By knockout: 7
- By submission: 17
- By decision: 10
- Losses: 13
- By knockout: 2
- By submission: 8
- By decision: 2
- By disqualification: 1

Other information
- Occupation: Boxer, Martial Arts
- University: University of Nebraska at Kearney
- Mixed martial arts record from Sherdog

Dakota Galen Cochrane (born May 1, 1986) is an American mixed martial artist who fights in the Lightweight and Welterweight divisions. He has competed for Bellator MMA, Resurrection Fighting Alliance, Legacy Fighting Championship, Titan Fighting Championships, and Legacy Fighting Alliance. Cochrane is currently competing as a bare-knuckle boxer in the Bare Knuckle Fighting Championship (BKFC). He has victories over former UFC fighters Johny Hendricks and Chris Leben.

As of April 13, 2026, he is #2 in the BKFC middleweight rankings.

== Background ==
Cochrane attended University of Nebraska at Kearney, where he was an all-league pole vaulter and relay runner.

== Mixed martial arts career ==
=== Early career ===
Cochrane competed seven times as an amateur, going undefeated. He made his pro debut in November 2009.

Cochrane began his professional career in late 2009, amassing a 4–0 start before his first loss to future UFC fighter TJ O'Brien in July 2010. O'Brien used his grappling to defeat Cochrane by rear naked choke early in the first round.

Cochrane bounced back from the loss bringing his record to 11–1 including a late replacement bout against former WEC champion Jamie Varner at Titan Fighting Championships 20 on September 23, 2011. The fight was taken on four days' notice and was fought at a catch-weight of 165 lb. Cochrane dominated the fight—both standing and on the ground—in a hard-fought unanimous-decision win.

=== The Ultimate Fighter ===
Cochrane appeared in the first episode of The Ultimate Fighter: Live facing James Vick. He lost to Vick via split decision.

=== Resurrection Fighting Alliance ===
Cochrane then fought former NCAA wrestling standout Ramico Blackmon at RFA 1 on December 16, 2011, in Kearney, Nebraska. Cochrane lost the fight by a 3-round unanimous decision in which Blackmon used his superior wrestling to neutralize Cochrane's stand up attack.

Cochrane lost for the second straight time in the RFA when he was submitted in the first round by Cliff Wright at RFA 2 on March 30, 2012. Cochrane took down Wright early in the round, but Wright was able to reverse the position, get Cochrane's back, and subsequently choke Cochrane unconscious with a rear naked choke.

Cochrane next defeated former UFC lightweight title contender Joe Stevenson in the main event of RFA 3 on June 30, 2012. After outstriking and outgrappling an out of shape Stevenson, Cochrane was able to sink in a rear naked choke to force the tap 64 seconds into the second round.

Cochrane won his second straight RFA fight at RFA 4 with a dominant victory over Derrick Burnsed. After escaping several submission attempts from Burnsed early on, Cochrane was able to latch on to a fight-ending armbar late in the first round.

Cochrane defeated Deivison Francisco Ribeiro via TKO due to elbows in the third round at RFA 6, Cochrane dominated the fight before finishing Ribeiro.

Cochrane stepped inside the cage again at RFA 17 against Christos Giagos for RFA's inaugural lightweight title on August 22 at the Sanford Pentagon, which was South Dakota's first-ever sanctioned MMA event. He lost the fight by KO due to a flying knee in round 2. This marked the first time Dakota had been knocked out in his career.

=== Bellator MMA ===
Cochrane stepped in for an injured Derek Campos to face Alexander Sarnavskiy at Bellator 128 on October 10, 2014. He lost the fight via rear naked choke submission in the first round.

Cochrane faced Ryan Couture at Bellator 135 on March 27, 2015. He lost the fight via rear naked choke submission in the first round and was subsequently released from the promotion.

== Bare knuckle boxing ==
=== World Bare Knuckle Fighting Federation ===
Cochrane replaced Brennan Ward at World Bare Knuckle Fighting Federation's inaugural event on November 9, 2018. He defeated Johny Hendricks by technical knockout in the second round.

=== Bare Knuckle Fighting Championship ===
Cochrane's next bare-knuckle boxing match was against Chris Leben at BKFC 6 on June 22, 2019. Cochrane won the match by unanimous decision.

Cochrane faced Tyler Vogel at BKFC 15 on December 11, 2020. He won by fifth-round TKO.

On September 10, 2021, Cochrane lost to Mike Richman at BKFC 21 by knockout in the second round.

Cochrane faced Josh Dyer at BKFC Fight Night 8 on May 13, 2022, and lost by first-round knockout.

Cochrane won his next bout against Eduardo Peralta at BKFC 33 on November 18, 2022, by knockout in the fifth round. Cochrane knocked out Noah Cutter on May 19, 2023, early in the first round at BKFC 43.

Cochrane faced Jeremie Holloway in the co-main event of BKFC Fight Night 14 on May 17, 2024. He won the fight by knockout in the second round.

Cochrane faced Will Santiago on February 1, 2025, at BKFC on DAZN 4. He won the fight by technical knockout in the third round.

Cochrane faced Marcus Edwards in the main event on April 18, 2025, at BKFC Fight Night 24. He lost the fight by technical knockout in the first round.

== Personal life ==
Dakota and his wife Lacey have three children.

Cochrane participated in gay pornography films, appearing on the gay porn website Sean Cody in 7 scenes filmed in 2007 under the stage name Danny. During his career in porn, Cochrane made around $80,000. Cochrane said he worked as a gay-for-pay actor and stopped participating in gay porn after his girlfriend at the time requested it.

== Championships and accomplishments ==
- Dynasty Combat Sports
  - DCS Welterweight Championship (One time, current)
- M-1 Global
  - M-1 Global USA National Welterweight Championship (One time)
- Victory Fighting Championship
  - VFC Welterweight Championship (One time)
- Total Warrior Combat
  - TWC Welterweight Championship (One time)
- The Cage Inc.
  - TCI Lightweight Championship (One time)

== Mixed martial arts record ==
Professional record breakdown
47 matches	34 wins	13 losses
By knockout	7	2
By submission	17	8
By decision	10	2
By disqualification	0	1

Res.	Record	Opponent	Method	Event	Date	Round	Time	Location	Notes
Win	34–13	Justin Baesman	Submission (arm-triangle choke)	DCS 77: New Years Knockout 2022	January 14, 2022	2	3:52	Omaha, Nebraska, United States	Won the vacant DCS Welterweight Championship.
Win	33–13	James Warfield	Submission (guillotine choke)	M-1 Global: Road to M-1 USA 2	April 4, 2019	1	1:19	Winterhaven, California, United States	Won the M-1 USA National Welterweight Championship.
Loss	32–13	Scott Futrell	Submission (rear naked choke)	DCS 45: Ballyard Brawl Night 2	July 28, 2018	2	2:19	Lincoln, Nebraska, United States	For the DCS Welterweight Championship
Win	32–12	Julian Lane	Submission (rear naked choke)	DCS 42: Rumble At The Ralston	May 25, 2018	1	2:35	Ralston, Nebraska, United States	
Win	31–12	Drew Lipton	Submission (guillotine choke)	DCS 38: Seasons Beatings 2017	December 9, 2017	1	0:21	Lincoln, Nebraska, United States	
Win	30–12	Ciro Rodrigues	Decision (split)	LFA 25	October 20, 2017	3	5:00	Ralston, Nebraska, United States	
Win	29–12	Maki Pitolo	Submission (guillotine choke)	Victory FC 58	July 22, 2017	2	4:58	Omaha, Nebraska, United States	
Win	28–12	David Castillo	Decision (unanimous)	Victory FC Fight Night Harrah's 5	June 3, 2017	3	5:00	Council Bluffs, Iowa, United States	
Loss	27–12	Jordan Larson	DQ (illegal knee)	Legacy Fighting Alliance Fight Night 1	April 29, 2017	2	1:15	Sioux Falls, South Dakota, United States	
Loss	27–11	E.J. Brooks	Decision (unanimous)	Victory FC 56	April 14, 2017	3	5:00	Omaha, Nebraska, United States	
Win	27–10	Jake Lindsey	Submission (guillotine choke)	Victory FC 55	December 23, 2016	1	0:53	Topeka, Kansas, United States	Won the VFC Welterweight Championship
Win	26–10	Jos Eichelberger	Submission (rear naked choke)	Legacy Fighting Championship 60	October 7, 2016	2	4:47	Hinckley, Minnesota, United States	
Win	25–10	Jason Witt	Submission (rear naked choke)	Victory FC 52	July 16, 2016	2	3:17	Omaha, Nebraska, United States	
Win	24–10	Dequan Townsend	Decision (split)	TWC 29: Jaynes vs. Lamson	May 14, 2016	5	5:00	Lansing, Michigan, United States	Won TWC Welterweight Championship
Loss	23–10	Valdir Araujo	TKO (punches)	Victory FC 49	April 1, 2016	2	4:21	Omaha, Nebraska, United States	
Win	23–9	Jake Lindsey	Submission (guillotine choke)	Victory FC 47	January 29, 2016	3	3:43	Omaha, Nebraska, United States	
Win	22–9	Raymond Gray	TKO (punches)	Dynasty Combat Sports 22: Seasons Beatings 2015	November 28, 2015	1	3:11	Lincoln, Nebraska, United States	
Win	21–9	Ben Neumann	Decision (unanimous)	RFA 32: Blumer vs. Higo	November 6, 2015	3	5:00	Prior Lake, Minnesota, United States	
Win	20–9	Sean Huffman	Submission (punches)	VFC: Fight Night at Harrahs 3	September 11, 2015	1	1:53	Council Bluffs, Iowa, United States	Return to Welterweight
Win	19–9	Mike Bruno	TKO (flying knee and punches)	Titan FC 34	July 18, 2015	3	0:51	Kansas City, Missouri, United States	
Loss	18–9	Jesse Steele McCall	Submission (rear naked choke)	VFC: Fight Night at Harrahs 2	June 6, 2015	1	4:57	Council Bluffs, Iowa, United States	
Loss	18–8	Ryan Couture	Submission (rear naked choke)	Bellator 135	March 27, 2015	1	3:23	Thackerville, Oklahoma, United States	
Win	18–7	Ted Worthington	TKO (punches)	Dynasty Combat Sports 12: Seasons Beatings 2014	December 5, 2014	1	0:43	Lincoln, Nebraska, United States	
Loss	17–7	Alexander Sarnavskiy	Submission (rear naked choke)	Bellator 128	October 10, 2014	1	2:32	Thackerville, Oklahoma, United States	
Loss	17–6	Christos Giagos	KO (flying knee and punches)	RFA 17: Cochrane vs. Giagos	August 22, 2014	2	2:04	Sioux Falls, South Dakota, United States	For inaugural RFA Lightweight Championship
Win	17–5	Anton Kuivanen	KO (flying knee)	Fight Night Finland: Cochrane vs. Kuivanen	June 14, 2014	1	0:48	Helsinki, Finland	
Win	16–5	Efraín Escudero	Decision (unanimous)	RFA 13: Cochrane vs. Escudero	March 7, 2014	3	5:00	Lincoln, Nebraska, United States	
Loss	15–5	Chris Heatherly	Submission (armbar)	Warriors for Heroes	October 26, 2013	1	4:13	St. Louis, Missouri, United States	For the vacant Warriors for Heroes Welterweight Championship
Win	15–4	Carey Vanier	KO (elbow)	Victory FC 40	July 27, 2013	1	4:23	Ralston, Nebraska, United States	
Loss	14–4	Marcus Edwards	Submission (rear naked choke)	Disorderly Conduct 19 – The Tribute	May 24, 2013	1	1:46	Omaha, Nebraska, United States	
Win	14–3	Deivison Francisco Ribeiro	TKO (elbows)	RFA 6: Krause vs. Imada 2	January 18, 2013	3	4:32	Kansas City, Missouri, United States	
Win	13–3	Derrick Burnsed	Submission (armbar)	RFA 4: Griffin vs. Escudero	November 2, 2012	1	4:38	Las Vegas, Nevada, United States	
Win	12–3	Joe Stevenson	Submission (rear naked choke)	RFA 3: Stevenson vs. Cochrane	June 30, 2012	2	1:04	Kearney, Nebraska, United States	
Loss	11–3	Cliff Wright	Submission (rear naked choke)	RFA 2: Yvel vs. Alexander	March 30, 2012	1	4:39	Kearney, Nebraska, United States	
Loss	11–2	Ramico Blackmon	Decision (unanimous)	RFA 1: Pulver vs. Elliott	December 16, 2011	3	5:00	Kearney, Nebraska, United States	165 lb catchweight
Win	11–1	Jamie Varner	Decision (unanimous)	Titan FC 20	September 23, 2011	3	5:00	Kansas City, Kansas, United States	165 lb catchweight
Win	10–1	George Sheppard	Decision (split)	The Cage Inc. – Battle at the Border 10	June 30, 2011	5	5:00	Hankinson, North Dakota, United States	Won the TCI Lightweight Championship
Win	9–1	Rod Montoya	Submission (rear naked choke)	Extreme Challenge 181	December 16, 2010	1	1:20	Council Bluffs, Iowa, United States	
Win	8–1	Marshall Martin	KO (punch)	The Cage Inc. – Battle at the Border 8	April 15, 2011	2	1:57	Hankinson, North Dakota, United States	
Win	7–1	Marcus LeVesseur	Submission (triangle choke)	Seconds Out/Vivid MMA: Combat On Capital Hill 4	November 12, 2010	1	4:08	St. Paul, Minnesota, United States	
Win	6–1	Will Shutt	Submission (arm-triangle choke)	Extreme Challenge 162	October 1, 2010	1	1:36	Council Bluffs, Iowa, United States	
Win	5–1	Jon Knutson	Decision (unanimous)	The Cage Inc. – Battle at the Border 6	August 21, 2010	3	5:00	Hankinson, North Dakota, United States	
Loss	4–1	TJ O'Brien	Submission (rear naked choke)	Extreme Challenge – High Stakes	July 16, 2010	1	2:00	Council Bluffs, Iowa, United States	
Win	4–0	Cory Simpson	Submission (rear naked choke)	The Cage Inc. – Battle at the Border 5	May 15, 2010	2	2:40	Hankinson, North Dakota, United States	
Win	3–0	Carlos Cladio	Submission (rear naked choke)	The Cage Inc. – Proving Grounds 2	April 2, 2010	1	2:05	Hankinson, North Dakota, United States	
Win	2–0	Jeremy Malaterre	Decision (unanimous)	Victory FC 30 – Night of Champions	February 5, 2010	3	5:00	Council Bluffs, Iowa, United States	
Win	1–0	Alex Harper	Decision (unanimous)	Victory FC 29 – The Rising	November 13, 2009	3	5:00	Council Bluffs, Iowa, United States	

Exhibition record breakdown		
1 match	0 wins	1 loss
By knockout	0	0
By submission	0	0
By decision	0	1

Res.	Record	Opponent	Method	Event	Date	Round	Time	Location	Notes
Loss	0–1	(United States) James Vick	Decision (split)	The Ultimate Fighter: Live	March 9, 2012	1	5:00	Las Vegas, Nevada, United States	1-round TUF entry fight

== Bareknuckle boxing record ==
Professional record breakdown
10 matches	7 wins	3 losses
By knockout	6	3
By decision	1	0

Res.	Record	Opponent	Method	Event	Date	Round	Time	Location	Notes
Loss	7–3	Marcus Edwards	TKO (punches)	BKFC Fight Night Omaha: Cochrane vs. Edwards	April 18, 2025	1	1:08	Omaha, Nebraska, United States	
Win	7–2	Will Santiago	TKO (corner stop)	BKFC on DAZN Mohegan Sun: Lane vs. VanCamp	February 1, 2025	3	1:03	Uncasville, Connecticut, United States	
Win	6–2	Jeremie Holloway	KO	BKFC Fight Night Omaha: Trinidad-Snake vs. Pague	May 17, 2024	2	0:42	Omaha, Nebraska, United States	
Win	5–2	Noah Cutter	KO (punches)	BKFC 43	May 19, 2023	1	0:56	Omaha, Nebraska, United States	
Win	4–2	Eduardo Peralta	KO (punches)	BKFC 33	November 18, 2022	5	0:35	Omaha, Nebraska, United States	Middleweight (175 lb) debut.
Loss	3–2	Josh Dyer	KO (punches)	BKFC Fight Night Omaha: Cochrane vs. Dyer	May 13, 2022	1	1:39	Omaha, Nebraska, United States	
Loss	3–1	Mike Richman	KO (punch)	BKFC 21	September 10, 2021	2	0:37	Omaha, Nebraska, United States	
Win	3–0	Tyler Vogel	TKO (doctor stoppage)	BKFC 15	December 11, 2020	5	1:21	Biloxi, Mississippi, United States	Light heavyweight (185 lb) debut.
Win	2–0	Chris Leben	Decision (unanimous)	BKFC 6	June 22, 2019	5	2:00	Tampa, Florida, United States	
Win	1–0	Johny Hendricks	TKO (punches)	World Bare Knuckle Fighting Federation	November 9, 2018	2	0:21	Casper, Wyoming, United States	
