= UFC 185 =

UFC mixed martial arts event in 2015

UFC 185: Pettis vs. dos Anjos
- The poster for UFC 185: Pettis vs. dos Anjos
- Promotion: Ultimate Fighting Championship
- Date: March 14, 2015
- Venue: American Airlines Center
- City: Dallas, Texas
- Attendance: 14,298
- Total gate: $2,155,630
- Buyrate: 310,000

Event chronology
UFC 184: Rousey vs. Zingano	UFC 185: Pettis vs. dos Anjos	UFC Fight Night: Maia vs. LaFlare

UFC 185: Pettis vs. dos Anjos was a mixed martial arts event held on March 14, 2015, at the American Airlines Center in Dallas, Texas.

== Background ==
The event was the third that the UFC has hosted in Dallas, Texas.

The event was headlined by a UFC Lightweight Championship bout between current champion Anthony Pettis and top contender Rafael dos Anjos.

The co-main event featured a UFC Women's Strawweight Championship bout between current champion Carla Esparza and top contender Joanna Jędrzejczyk.

Matt Brown was scheduled to face Tarec Saffiedine in the main event of UFC Fight Night 60. However, Saffiedine pulled out due to a groin injury and Brown was instead matched up against former UFC Welterweight champion Johny Hendricks at this event.

Vagner Rocha was expected to face promotional newcomer Joseph Duffy at the event. However, Rocha pulled out of the bout in early February and was replaced by Jake Lindsey.

Daron Cruickshank missed weight on his first attempt at the weigh ins, coming in at 157.5 pounds. He was given additional time to make the lightweight limit, but missed weight again, coming in at 157 pounds. Subsequently, he was fined 20 percent of his purse, which went to Beneil Dariush.

== Results ==
Main Card
Weight class				Method	Round	Time	Notes
Lightweight	Rafael dos Anjos	def.	Anthony Pettis (c)	Decision (unanimous) (50–45, 50–45, 50–45)	5	5:00	(Note: For the UFC Lightweight Championship.)
Women's Strawweight	Joanna Jędrzejczyk	def.	Carla Esparza (c)	TKO (punches)	2	4:17	(Note: For the UFC Women's Strawweight Championship.)
Welterweight	Johny Hendricks	def.	Matt Brown	Decision (unanimous) (30–27, 30–27, 30–27)	3	5:00
Heavyweight	Alistair Overeem	def.	Roy Nelson	Decision (unanimous) (30–27, 30–27, 30–27)	3	5:00
Flyweight	Henry Cejudo	def.	Chris Cariaso	Decision (unanimous) (30–27, 30–27, 30–27)	3	5:00
Preliminary Card (FX)
Lightweight	Ross Pearson	def.	Sam Stout	KO (punches)	2	1:33
Middleweight	Elias Theodorou	def.	Roger Narvaez	TKO (punches)	2	4:07
Catchweight (157 lb)	Beneil Dariush	def.	Daron Cruickshank	Submission (rear-naked choke)	2	2:48
Heavyweight	Jared Rosholt	def.	Josh Copeland	TKO (punches)	3	3:12
Preliminary Card (UFC Fight Pass)
Flyweight	Ryan Benoit	def.	Sergio Pettis	TKO (punches)	2	1:34
Lightweight	Joseph Duffy	def.	Jake Lindsey	TKO (head kick and body punch)	1	1:47
Women's Bantamweight	Germaine de Randamie	def.	Larissa Pacheco	TKO (punches)	2	2:02

== Bonus awards ==
The following fighters were awarded $50,000 bonuses:

- Fight of the Night: None awarded
- Performance of the Night: Rafael dos Anjos, Joanna Jędrzejczyk, Ross Pearson and Beneil Dariush

== See also ==
- List of UFC events
- 2015 in UFC
