= Jake Lindsey (fighter) =

American mixed martial artist (born 1986)

- Born: June 21, 1986 (age 40); Manhattan, Kansas, United States
- Other names: The Librarian
- Height: 5 ft 11 in (1.80 m)
- Weight: 170 lb (77 kg; 12 st 2 lb)
- Division: Welterweight; Lightweight
- Reach: 70 in (180 cm)
- Fighting out of: Manhattan, Kansas, United States
- Team: Combative Sports Center
- Years active: 2010–present

Mixed martial arts record
- Total: 26
- Wins: 15
- By knockout: 5
- By submission: 7
- By decision: 3
- Losses: 11
- By knockout: 4
- By submission: 4
- By decision: 3

Other information
- Mixed martial arts record from Sherdog

Jake Lindsey (born June 21, 1986) is an American mixed martial artist who competes in the Lightweight division. A professional since 2010, he has fought in the UFC, Bellator, the Legacy Fighting Alliance, and Titan FC.

== Background ==
Lindsey was born and raised in Manhattan, Kansas. He attended Kansas State University before beginning training in mixed martial arts in early 2007.

== Mixed martial arts career ==
=== Early career ===
Lindsey competed as an amateur with an undefeated 7–0 record before making his professional debut in 2010 competing for various regional promotions across the Midwest. He was able to compile a record of 9–0, before signing with the UFC in early 2014.

=== Ultimate Fighting Championship ===
Lindsey made his promotional debut as a short notice replacement for an injured Yosdenis Cedeno and faced Jon Tuck on June 7, 2014, at UFC Fight Night 42. After a competitive first two rounds, Lindsey was defeated by submission in the third round as he tapped to a series of heel strikes to the ribs.

Lindsey faced Olivier Aubin-Mercier on October 4, 2014, at UFC Fight Night 54. After a fairly even first round, Aubin-Mercier won the bout via submission in the second round, as he was able to lock an inverted triangle on Lindsey and get the tap while applying a kimura.

Lindsey faced promotional newcomer Joseph Duffy on March 14, 2015, at UFC 185. He lost the fight via TKO in the first round and was subsequently released from the promotion.

== Bare-knuckle boxing ==
Lindsey was expected to make his bare-knuckle boxing debut at BKFC 11 on July 24, 2020, against Kenny Licea. However, the bout was scrapped as the event was postponed due to the COVID-19 pandemic.

He ultimately made his debut against Eric Thompson at BKFC Fight Night 2 on October 23, 2021. He won the fight via third-round technical knockout.

Lindsey competed for the vacant BKFC Welterweight Championship against Gorjan Slaveski on August 25, 2023 in the main event at BKFC 49 and lost by unanimous decision.

== Championships and accomplishments ==
- Unified MMA
  - Unified MMA Catchweight Championship (one time; former)
- Victory Fighting Championship
  - VFC Welterweight Championship (one time; former)
    - One successful title defense

== Mixed martial arts record ==
Professional record breakdown
26 matches	15 wins	11 losses
By knockout	5	4
By submission	7	4
By decision	3	3
No contests	0	

Res.	Record	Opponent	Method	Event	Date	Round	Time	Location	Notes
Loss	15–11	Chance Rencountre	Submission (rear-naked choke)	FAC 11	December 10, 2021	2	0:44	Independence, Missouri, United States	
Win	15–10	Fernando Martinez	Submission (rear-naked choke)	FAC 9	July 30, 2021	1	3:41	Independence, Missouri, United States	
Loss	14–10	Jason High	TKO (punches)	FAC 5	December 11, 2020	5	0:20	Independence, Missouri, United States	For the FAC Welterweight Championship.
Loss	14–9	Julien Williams	Decision (unanimous)	Never Surrender MMA	September 14, 2019	3	5:00	Salina, Kansas, United States	
Win	14–8	Pat Pytlik	Technical Submission (guillotine choke)	Unified MMA 36: Mayhem	March 1, 2019	2	3:25	Enoch, Alberta, Canada	Catchweight (165 lb) bout; Won the Unified MMA Catchweight Championship.
Win	13–8	Dawond Pickney	Submission (guillotine choke)	EFC: Evolution Fighting Championship 10	October 20, 2018	1	2:31	Mulvane, Kansas, United States	
Loss	12–8	Jason Witt	Decision (unanimous)	Cageside Promotions/KCFA 25	September 30, 2017	3	5:00	Independence, Missouri, United States	
Loss	12–7	David Michaud	TKO (injury)	Legacy Fighting Alliance Fight Night 1	April 29, 2017	3	1:14	Sioux Falls, South Dakota, United States	
Win	12–6	Aaron Highfill	Decision (unanimous)	Shamrock FC: Shamrock 286	March 24, 2017	3	5:00	St. Louis, Missouri, United States	
Loss	11–6	Chance Rencountre	Decision (split)	Bellator 171	January 27, 2017	3	5:00	Mulvane, Kansas, United States	
Loss	11–5	Dakota Cochrane	Submission (guillotine choke)	VFC 55	December 23, 2016	1	0:53	Topeka, Kansas, United States	For the VFC Welterweight Championship.
Win	11–4	Zak Bucia	TKO (knee and punches)	VFC 50	May 21, 2016	3	1:26	Topeka, Kansas, United States	Lightweight bout.
Loss	10–4	Dakota Cochrane	Submission (guillotine choke)	VFC 47	January 29, 2016	3	3:43	Omaha, Nebraska, United States	Welterweight debut.
Win	10–3	Ian Stonehouse	Submission (rear-naked choke)	VFC Fight Night 6	October 23, 2015	2	2:15	Junction City, Kansas, United States	Catchweight (160 lb) bout.
Loss	9–3	Joseph Duffy	TKO (head kick and body punch)	UFC 185	March 14, 2015	1	1:47	Dallas, Texas, United States	
Loss	9–2	Olivier Aubin-Mercier	Submission (inverted triangle kimura)	UFC Fight Night: MacDonald vs. Saffiedine	October 4, 2014	2	3:22	Halifax, Nova Scotia, Canada	
Loss	9–1	Jon Tuck	TKO (submission to heel strikes)	UFC Fight Night: Henderson vs. Khabilov	June 7, 2014	3	2:47	Albuquerque, New Mexico, United States	
Win	9–0	Ted Worthington	TKO (punches)	VFC: Junction City 5	February 8, 2014	1	4:54	Junction City, Kansas, United States	
Win	8–0	Zach Freeman	KO (punches)	Titan Fighting Championship 25	June 7, 2013	1	2:31	Fort Riley, Kansas, United States	
Win	7–0	Marcio Navarro	KO (punch)	VFC: Wichita 1	April 27, 2013	1	2:12	Wichita, Kansas, United States	Defended the VFC Lightweight Championship.
Win	6–0	Darion Terry	Submission (punches)	VFC: Junction City 3	February 8, 2013	2	2:06	Junction City, Kansas, United States	Won the vacant VFC Lightweight Championship.
Win	5–0	Jordan Johnson	Decision (unanimous)	Titan Fighting Championship 23	June 15, 2012	3	5:00	Fort Riley, Kansas, United States	
Win	4–0	William de Souza	Submission (rear-naked choke)	VFC: Junction City 2	February 1, 2012	1	3:59	Junction City, Kansas, United States	
Win	3–0	Danny Black	Submission (rear-naked choke)	VFC: Junction City 2	August 26, 2011	1	1:49	Junction City, Kansas, United States	
Win	2–0	Beto Serrano	KO (punch)	VFC 34	April 1, 2011	2	0:20	Council Bluffs, Iowa, United States	
Win	1–0	Bobby Cooper	Decision (unanimous)	Eye Win: Devastation	June 19, 2010	3	5:00	Wichita, Kansas, United States	

== Bare-knuckle boxing record ==
Professional record breakdown
5 matches	4 wins	1 loss
By knockout	4	0
By decision	0	1

Res.	Record	Opponent	Method	Event	Date	Round	Time	Location	Notes
Loss	4–2	Gorjan Slaveski	Decision (unanimous)	BKFC 49	August 25, 2023	5	2:00	Miami, Florida, United States	
Win	4–0	Connor Tierney	KO (punches)	BKFC 37	March 4, 2023	5	1:02	London, England	For the vacant BKFC Welterweight Championship.)
Win	3–0	Brandon Girtz	TKO (doctor stoppage)	BKFC 31	October 15, 2022	2	2:00	Broomfield, Colorado, United States	
Win	2–0	Derrick Findley	TKO (corner stoppage)	BKFC 23	April 8, 2022	4	2:00	Wichita, Kansas, United States	
Win	1–0	Eric Thompson	KO (punch)	BKFC Fight Night Wichita: Rickels vs. Lane	October 23, 2021	3	1:00	Wichita, Kansas, United States	

== See also ==
- List of current UFC fighters
- List of male mixed martial artists
