= Derek Campos =

American mixed martial arts fighter

- Born: Francisco Derek Campos; April 1, 1988 (age 38); Lubbock, Texas, United States
- Other names: The Stallion
- Height: 5 ft 9 in (1.75 m)
- Weight: 145 lb (66 kg; 10.4 st)
- Division: Lightweight; Featherweight
- Reach: 68 in (173 cm)
- Fighting out of: Lubbock, Texas, United States
- Team: Mohler MMA
- Years active: 2009–present

Mixed martial arts record
- Total: 36
- Wins: 20
- By knockout: 6
- By submission: 5
- By decision: 9
- Losses: 16
- By knockout: 6
- By submission: 5
- By decision: 5

Other information
- University: Dallas College Brookhaven; Texas Tech University
- Notable school: Coronado High School
- Mixed martial arts record from Sherdog

Francisco Derek Campos (born April 1, 1988) is an American professional mixed martial artist currently competing in the Featherweight division. A professional competitor since 2009, Campos has competed for Bellator MMA, Shark Fights and King of the Cage, and is the former King of the Cage Light Welterweight Champion.

== Background ==
Originally from Lubbock, Texas, Campos competed in high school football and first began training in boxing and wrestling at the age of 19.

== Mixed martial arts career ==
=== Early career ===
After a 2–0 amateur career, Campos started his professional career in 2009, fighting exclusively for Texas and Louisiana-based promotions.

In 2012, with a record of 9–2, Campos signed with Bellator.

=== Bellator MMA ===
Campos made his promotional debut against Rich Clementi on May 25, 2012, at Bellator 70. He lost via submission due to a guillotine choke in the first round.

Campos faced Brandon Girtz on June 19, 2013, at Bellator 96. He won via unanimous decision (29-28, 29-28, 29-28).

Campos faced Martin Stapleton on November 8, 2013, at Bellator 107. Once again he won via unanimous decision.

Campos was expected to rematch Brandon Girtz in the quarterfinal match of Bellator Season Ten Lightweight Tournament on March 21, 2014, at Bellator 113. However, his opponent was changed and he faced Tim Welch. He won the fight via unanimous decision. Campos faced Patricky Freire in the semifinals at Bellator 117 and lost the bout via TKO in the second round.

Campos faced Estevan Payan on September 26, 2014, at Bellator 126. He won the fight via knockout just 31 seconds into the first round.

Stepping in for a recently retired John Gunderson, Campos was expected to face Alexander Sarnavskiy at Bellator 128 on October 10, 2014. However, an injury forced Campos out of the bout. Dakota Cochrane stepped in as a replacement.

Campos faced former Bellator Lightweight Champion Michael Chandler on June 19, 2015, at Bellator 138. He lost the fight via submission in the first round.

Campos finally rematched Brandon Girtz at Bellator 146 on November 20, 2015. He lost the fight via knockout in the first round.

Campos next faced Melvin Guillard on February 19, 2016, at Bellator 149. He won the fight via a flurry of punches in the second round, resulting in a TKO victory.

Campos faced up-and-coming Djamil Chan at Bellator 161 on September 16, 2016. In the first round, Campos was almost finished by a series of punches after absorbing a punch on the feet. However, he survived the onslaught and went on to win the fight via unanimous decision.

Campos faced Derek Anderson at Bellator 170 on January 21, 2017. He won the fight via unanimous decision.

Campos was expected to face Patricky Freire at Bellator 181 on July 14, 2017. The pair previously met at Bellator 117 on April 18, 2014, in the quarter-final round of the Bellator season ten lightweight tournament, in which Campos was defeated via second-round TKO. The rematch was originally scheduled to take place at Bellator 167 on December 3, 2016, however an injury forced Freire out of the bout. During the Bellator 180 fight card, it was revealed by the promotion that Campos would instead face Brandon Girtz in a third fight at the event. Campos won the rubber match by TKO via doctor stoppage at the end of the second round due to cut on Girtz's forehead caused by a Campos knee.

Campos faced Patricky Freire in a rematch at Bellator 194 on February 16, 2018. He lost the fight via TKO in round one.

In his next fight, Campos moved down to Featherweight and faced Sam Sicilia at Bellator 212 on December 14, 2018. He lost the back-and-forth fight by split decision.

Campos next faced Pedro Carvalho at Bellator: Birmingham on May 4, 2019. He lost the bout by way of first round knockout.

==== Bellator Featherweight World Grand Prix ====
In the opening round of the Featherweight Grand Prix, Campos faced former two-time Bellator Featherweight world champion Daniel Straus at Bellator 226 on September 7, 2019. Campos went on to defeat Straus in a dominant unanimous decision win, with the judges scores reading 30–26, 30–25, 30–25.

In the quarterfinals, Campos faced A.J. McKee at Bellator 236 on December 21, 2019. He lost the bout via third round submission.

==== Post grand-prix ====
Campos was expected to face Roger Huerta at Bellator 246 on September 12, 2020. However, he ultimately faced Keoni Diggs at the event. At the weigh-ins, Diggs weighed in at 157 pounds, 1 pound over the non-title lightweight limit of 156 pounds. The bout proceeded at a catchweight with a percentage of Diggs' purse going to Campos. He lost the bout via a rear-naked choke submission in the third round.

On October 27, 2020, it was announced that Campos had been released from Bellator.

=== Post-Bellator career ===
After almost a decade in Bellator, Campos was scheduled to face Kyle Bochniak at XMMA^{2} on July 30, 2021. However, Campos withdrew from the bout due to an injury and was replaced by Marcus Brimage.

Campos faced Diego Brandão at Peak Fighting 29 on June 10, 2023, losing the bout via unanimous decision.

== Bare-knuckle boxing ==
=== Bare Knuckle Fighting Championship ===
Campos was scheduled to make his debut against former UFC fighter Michael Trizano in a lightweight bout at BKFC 61 on May 11, 2024. However, in early May 2024, the bout was removed for unknown reasons.

Campos is scheduled to face Jake Heffernan on June 21, 2025 at BKFC 76.

== Championships and accomplishments ==
=== Mixed martial arts ===
- King of the Cage
  - KOTC Light Welterweight Championship (One time)

== Mixed martial arts record ==
Professional record breakdown
36 matches	20 wins	16 losses
By knockout	6	6
By submission	5	5
By decision	9	5

Res.	Record	Opponent	Method	Event	Date	Round	Time	Location	Notes
Loss	20–16	Alan Salamov	TKO (punches)	Fury FC 120	May 31, 2026	2	2:37	Houston, Texas, United States	Catchweight (180 lb) bout.
Loss	20–15	Richard Mayol	Submission (face crank)	Fury FC 116	February 20, 2026	1	3:01	Houston, Texas, United States	
Loss	20–14	Artur Minev	TKO (punches)	Fury FC 113	January 18, 2026	1	3:05	Houston, Texas, United States	Catchweight (165 lb) bout.
Loss	20–13	Devin Smyth	Decision (unanimous)	Peak Fighting 49	October 18, 2025	3	5:00	Amarillo, Texas, United States	Welterweight debut; Smyth missed weight (171.5 lb).
Loss	20–12	Diego Brandão	Decision (unanimous)	Peak Fighting 29	June 10, 2023	3	5:00	Amarillo, Texas, United States	Catchweight (161 lb) bout.
Loss	20–11	Keoni Diggs	Technical Submission (rear-naked choke)	Bellator 246	September 12, 2020	3	4:59	Uncasville, Connecticut, United States	Lightweight bout; Diggs missed weight (157 lb).
Loss	20–10	A. J. McKee	Submission (armbar)	Bellator 236	December 21, 2019	3	1:08	Honolulu, Hawaii, United States	Bellator Featherweight World Grand Prix Quarterfinal.
Win	20–9	Daniel Straus	Decision (unanimous)	Bellator 226	September 7, 2019	3	5:00	San Jose, California, United States	Bellator Featherweight World Grand Prix Opening Round.
Loss	19–9	Pedro Carvalho	TKO (punches)	Bellator Birmingham	May 4, 2019	1	2:02	Birmingham, England	Lightweight bout.
Loss	19–8	Sam Sicilia	Decision (split)	Bellator 212	December 14, 2018	3	5:00	Honolulu, Hawaii, United States	Featherweight debut.
Loss	19–7	Patricky Pitbull	TKO (punches)	Bellator 194	February 16, 2018	1	2:23	Uncasville, Connecticut, United States	
Win	19–6	Brandon Girtz	TKO (doctor stoppage)	Bellator 181	July 14, 2017	2	5:00	Thackerville, Oklahoma, United States	Catchweight (157.7 lb) bout; Girtz missed weight.
Win	18–6	Derek Anderson	Decision (unanimous)	Bellator 170	January 21, 2017	3	5:00	Inglewood, California, United States	Catchweight (160.1 lb) bout; Anderson missed weight.
Win	17–6	Djamil Chan	Decision (unanimous)	Bellator 161	September 16, 2016	3	5:00	Cedar Park, Texas, United States	
Win	16–6	Melvin Guillard	KO (punches)	Bellator 149	February 19, 2016	2	0:32	Houston, Texas, United States	
Loss	15–6	Brandon Girtz	TKO (punches)	Bellator 146	November 20, 2015	1	0:37	Thackerville, Oklahoma, United States	
Loss	15–5	Michael Chandler	Submission (rear-naked choke)	Bellator 138	June 19, 2015	1	2:17	St. Louis, Missouri, United States	
Win	15–4	Estevan Payan	TKO (punch)	Bellator 126	September 26, 2014	1	0:31	Phoenix, Arizona, United States	
Loss	14–4	Patricky Freire	TKO (punches)	Bellator 117	April 18, 2014	2	0:52	Council Bluffs, Iowa, United States	Bellator Season Ten Lightweight Tournament Semifinal.
Win	14–3	Tim Welch	Decision (unanimous)	Bellator 113	March 21, 2014	3	5:00	Mulvane, Kansas, United States	Bellator Season Ten Lightweight Tournament Quarterfinal.
Win	13–3	Martin Stapleton	Decision (unanimous)	Bellator 107	November 8, 2013	3	5:00	Thackerville, Oklahoma, United States	Catchweight (157 lb) bout; both fighters missed weight.
Win	12–3	Brandon Girtz	Decision (unanimous)	Bellator 96	June 19, 2013	3	5:00	Thackerville, Oklahoma, United States	Catchweight (157.2 lb) bout; Campos missed weight.
Win	11–3	Derrick Krantz	Submission (rear-naked choke)	Ascend Combat: Mayhem 3	May 11, 2013	3	4:15	Shreveport, Louisiana, United States	Catchweight (160 lb) bout.
Win	10–3	Joe Condon	TKO (punches)	KOTC: Stranglehold	October 6, 2012	3	1:56	Thackerville, Oklahoma, United States	Won the vacant KOTC Light Welterweight Championship.
Loss	9–3	Rich Clementi	Submission (guillotine choke)	Bellator 70	May 25, 2012	1	4:18	New Orleans, Louisiana, United States	Catchweight (157 lb) bout; Clementi missed weight.
Win	9–2	Kota Okazawa	Submission (neck crank)	G1 Fights: Sovereign Valor	January 28, 2012	2	3:46	Kinder, Louisiana, United States	
Loss	8–2	Scott Cleve	Decision (split)	Ultimate Warrior Fighting 1	November 26, 2011	3	5:00	Pharr, Texas, United States	
Win	8–1	Marcus Andrusia	TKO (punches)	Global Fighting Alliance 15	October 29, 2011	1	1:37	Sulphur, Louisiana, United States	
Win	7–1	Gilbert Jimenez	Decision (unanimous)	Triple-A Promotions	July 29, 2011	3	3:00	Amarillo, Texas, United States	
Win	6–1	Cody Pfister	Submission (rear-naked choke)	Undisputed MMA 1	June 18, 2011	1	2:55	Amarillo, Texas, United States	
Win	5–1	Anselmo Luna	Decision (unanimous)	Shark Fights 11	May 22, 2010	3	5:00	Odessa, Texas, United States	
Loss	4–1	Diego Brandão	Decision (split)	King of Kombat 8	February 27, 2010	3	5:00	Austin, Texas, United States	
Win	4–0	Yosdenis Cedeno	Submission	Art of War: Mano A Mano	July 12, 2009	3	1:59	Mesquite, Texas, United States	
Win	3–0	Adam Schindler	Decision (unanimous)	King of Kombat 6	April 25, 2009	3	5:00	Austin, Texas, United States	
Win	2–0	Clay Shackleford	KO (punch)	Global Fighting Alliance: Mardi Gras Mayhem	February 28, 2009	1	0:27	Alexandria, Louisiana, United States	
Win	1–0	Brandon Crick	Submission (rear-naked choke)	Xtreme Knockout 2	January 10, 2009	2	0:35	Arlington, Texas, United States	Lightweight debut.

== See also ==
- List of current mixed martial arts champions
- List of male mixed martial artists
