= 2024 in Bare Knuckle Fighting Championship =

Information
- First date: January 27, 2024

Events
- Total events: 31

Fights
- Total fights: 337
- Title fights: 22

Chronology
| 2023 in BKFC | 2024 in Bare Knuckle Fighting Championship | 2025 in BKFC |

The year 2024 is the seventh year in the history of the Bare Knuckle Fighting Championship, a bare-knuckle fighting promotion based in Philadelphia.

== Background ==
The 2024 season started with Bare Knuckle Fighting Championship Fight Night Prospects: Albuquerque, followed by Bare Knuckle Fighting Championship 57 on February 2, 2024. BKFC is available on Triller TV PPV.

== List of events ==
| # | Event | Date | Venue | Location |
|---|---|---|---|---|
| 1 | BKFC Fight Night Prospects: Albuquerque | January 27, 2024 | Revel Arena | (United States) Albuquerque, New Mexico, USA |
| 2 | BKFC 57: Palomino vs. Trout | February 2, 2024 | Seminole Hard Rock Hotel & Casino Hollywood | (United States) Hollywood, Florida, USA |
| 3 | BKFC Fight Night Prospects: Manassas | February 16, 2024 | The Salisbury Center | (United States) Manassas, Virginia, USA |
| 4 | BKFC Fight Night Prospects: Canada | March 3, 2024 | River Cree Resort and Casino | Edmonton, Alberta, Canada |
| 5 | BKFC Fight Night Miami: Davis vs. Wilson | March 15, 2024 | Dolphin Mall | (United States) Miami, Florida, USA |
| 6 | BKFC 58 Bulgaria: Markulev vs. Kolev | March 22, 2024 | Arena Sofia | Sofia, Bulgaria |
| 7 | BKFC 59 Albuquerque: Dodson vs. Aguero | March 29, 2024 | Tingley Coliseum | (United States) Albuquerque, New Mexico, USA |
| 8 | BKFC 60 Milton Keynes: Lilley vs. Tenaglia | April 6, 2024 | Planet Ice Arena Milton Keynes | Milton Keynes, England |
| 9 | BKFC Fight Night Clearwater: Richman vs. Lozano | April 12, 2024 | Bert's Barracuda Harley-Davidson | (United States) Clearwater, Florida, USA |
| 10 | BKFC Knucklemania IV | April 27, 2024 | Peacock Theater | (United States) Los Angeles, California, USA |
| 11 | BKFC 61 Connecticut: Rivera vs. Straus | May 11, 2024 | Mohegan Sun | (United States) Uncasville, Connecticut, USA |
| 12 | BKFC Fight Night Omaha: Trinidad-Snake vs. Pague | May 17, 2024 | Liberty First Credit Union Arena | (United States) Ralston, Nebraska, USA |
| 13 | BKFC Fight Night Puebla, Mexico: Rubio vs. Rey Gallegos | May 25, 2024 | Auditorio Explanada Pachuca | Puebla, Mexico |
| 14 | BKFC Fight Night Prospects: Denver | May 31, 2024 | National Western Center | (United States) Denver, Colorado, USA |
| 15 | BKFC Fight Night Prospects: Newcastle | June 8, 2024 | Walker Activity Dome | Newcastle upon Tyne, England |
| 16 | BKFC 62 Hollywood, FL: Stewart vs. Duran | June 21, 2024 | Seminole Hard Rock Hotel & Casino Hollywood | (United States) Hollywood, Florida, USA |
| 17 | BKFC Fight Night Pechanga: Peralta vs. Warr | July 12, 2024 | Pechanga Resort Casino | (United States) Temecula, California, USA |
| 18 | BKFC 63 Sturgis: Hart vs. Starling | August 3, 2024 | Buffalo Chip Campground | (United States) Sturgis, South Dakota, USA |
| 19 | BKFC 64 Coventry: Tierney vs. Graham | August 10, 2024 | Coventry Skydome | Coventry, England |
| 20 | BKFC Fight Night Kansas City: Lindsay vs. Brito | August 16, 2024 | Memorial Hall | (United States) Kansas City, Kansas |
| 21 | BKFC Fight Night Prospects: Edmonton | August 31, 2024 | River Cree Resort & Casino | Enoch, Alberta, Canada |
| 22 | BKFC 65 Salt Lake City: Ferea vs. Masson-Wong | September 6, 2024 | Maverik Center | (United States) Salt Lake City, Utah |
| 23 | BKFC 66 Hollywood, FL: Blas vs. Reber | September 13, 2024 | Seminole Hard Rock Hotel & Casino Hollywood | (United States) Hollywood, Florida |
| 24 | BKFC on DAZN: Tenaglia vs. Soto | October 12, 2024 | Marbella Arena | Marbella, Spain |
| 25 | BKFC 67 Denver: Camozzi vs. Depee | October 25, 2024 | Denver Coliseum | (United States) Denver, Colorado |
| 26 | BKFC Fight Night Prospects: Myrtle Beach | October 26, 2024 | John T. Rhodes Myrtle Beach Sports Center | (United States) Myrtle Beach, South Carolina |
| 27 | BKFC 68 Newcastle: Faulkner vs. Oscar | November 2, 2024 | Utilita Arena | Newcastle upon Tyne, England |
| 28 | BKFC on DAZN Montana: Stewart vs. Rivera | November 9, 2024 | First Interstate Arena | (United States) Billings, Montana |
| 29 | BKFC Fight Night Los Angeles: Warr vs. Khanakov | November 23, 2024 | Thunder Studios | (United States) Los Angeles, California |
| 30 | BKFC 69 Atlanta: Richardson vs. Larrimore | December 6, 2024 | Gas South Arena | (United States) Duluth, Georgia |
| 31 | BKFC on DAZN Hollywood, FL: Warren vs. Richman | December 21, 2024 | Seminole Hard Rock Hotel & Casino Hollywood | (United States) Hollywood, Florida |

== BKFC Fight Night Prospects: Albuquerque ==
BKFC Fight Night Prospects: Albuquerque
- Promotion: Bare Knuckle Fighting Championship
- Date: January 27, 2024
- Venue: Revel Arena
- City: (United States) Albuquerque, New Mexico

BKFC Fight Night Prospects: Albuquerque was a bare-knuckle fighting event held by Bare Knuckle Fighting Championship on January 27, 2024.

=== Results ===
BKFC Fight Night Prospects: Albuquerque
| Weight Class | | | | Method | Round | Time | Notes |
|---|---|---|---|---|---|---|---|
| Middleweight 79 kg | (United States) Donald Sanchez | def. | (United States) Noah Cutter | KO | 1 | 0:35 | |
| W.Strawweight 52 kg | (United States) Taylor Starling | def. | (United States) Jenny Savage | Decision (unanimous) | 5 | 2:00 | 48-47, 50-45, 49-46 |
| Featherweight 66 kg | (United States) Eric Dodson | def. | (United States) Dakota Highpine | KO | 1 | 0:40 | |
| Light Heavyweight 84 kg | (United States) William Albrecht | def. | (United States) Freddy Sandoval | KO | 1 | 1:59 | |
| Middleweight 79 kg | (Russia) Ismail Israilov | def. | (United States) Danasabe Mohammed | KO | 1 | 1:12 | |
| Heavyweight 120 kg | (United States) Juan Adams | def. | (United States) Matt Adams | TKO | 3 | 1:30 | |
| W.Strawweight 52 kg | (United States) Karla Alvarez | def. | (United States) Brittany Horton | TKO | 1 | 1:59 | |
| Welterweight 75 kg | (United States) Felipe Chavez | def. | (United States) Michael Manno | TKO | 3 | 1:27 | |
| Welterweight 75 kg | (United States) Kaine Tomlinson Jr. | def. | (United States) Apostle Spencer | KO | 1 | 0:33 | |
| Lightweight 70 kg | (United States) Zachary Pannell | def. | (United States) Kasey Yates | KO | 1 | 1:44 | |

== BKFC 57: Palomino vs. Trout ==
BKFC 57: Palomino vs. Trout
- Promotion: Bare Knuckle Fighting Championship
- Date: February 2, 2024
- Venue: Seminole Hard Rock Hotel & Casino Hollywood
- City: (United States) Hollywood, Florida

BKFC 57: Palomino vs. Trout was a bare-knuckle fighting event held by Bare Knuckle Fighting Championship on February 2, 2024, at the Seminole Hard Rock Hotel & Casino Hollywood in Hollywood, Florida, USA.

=== Background ===
The event was headlined by Luis Palomino against Austin Trout for the vacant BKFC Welterweight Championship. A women's flyweight bout with Christine Vicens and Sydney Smith was cancelled. An originally-scheduled flyweight bout between Matt Russo and Justin Street did not take place either.

At the post-press conference, BKFC CEO David Feldman said this event was the highest-grossing and attended event for a combat sporting event at the Seminole Hard Rock Casino with almost 6,000 people in attendance.

Bonus awards

The following fighters were awarded bonuses:

- Fight of the Night: Bryan Duran vs. Louie Lopez
- Knockout of the Night: Leonardo Perdomo and Justin Ibarrola
- Performance of the Night: Bryce Henry, Bryan Duran, John Michael Escoboza, Alberto Blas, Ryan Reber and Derek Perez

=== Fight card ===
BKFC 57: Palomino vs. Trout
| Weight Class | | | | Method | Round | Time | Notes |
|---|---|---|---|---|---|---|---|
| Welterweight 75 kg | (United States) Austin Trout | def. | (Peru) Luis Palomino | Decision (unanimous) | 5 | 2:00 | For the vacant BKFC welterweight Championship. 49-45, 49-45, 49-45 |
| Lightweight 70 kg | (United States) Bryce Henry | def. | (United States) Robbie Peralta | TKO | 2 | 2:00 | |
| Featherweight 66 kg | (United States) Bryan Duran | def. | (United States) Louie Lopez | KO | 4 | 0:48 | |
| Cruiserweight 93 kg | (Dominican Republic) John Michael Escoboza | def. | (United States) Isaac Doolittle | KO | 3 | 1:58 | |
| Bantamweight 61 kg | (Cuba) Alberto Blas | def. | (United States) Frank Alvarez | KO | 1 | 1:00 | |
| Heavyweight 120 kg | (United States) Leonardo Perdomo | def. | (United States) Bobby Brents | KO | 1 | 0:33 | |
| Featherweight 66 kg | (United States) Justin Ibarrola | def. | (United States) Landon Williams | KO | 1 | 0:15 | |
| Featherweight 66 kg | (United States) Edgard Plazaola | def. | (United States) Darrick Gates | KO | 1 | 1:59 | |
Preliminary Card
| Bantamweight 61 kg | (United States) Chris Garcia | def. | (United States) Albert Inclan | Decision (majority) | 5 | 2:00 | 47-47, 48-46, 48-46 |
| Bantamweight 61 kg | (United States) Ryan Reber | def. | (United States) Derek Perez | TKO | 4 | 1:14 | |
| Cruiserweight 95 kg | (United States) Leo Bercier | def. | (United States) Stephen Townsel | KO | 4 | 2:10 | |

== BKFC Fight Night Prospects: Manassas ==
BKFC Fight Night Prospects: Manassas
- Promotion: Bare Knuckle Fighting Championship
- Date: February 16, 2024
- Venue: The Salisbury Center
- City: (United States) Manassas, Virginia

BKFC Fight Night Prospects: Manassas was a bare-knuckle fighting event held by Bare Knuckle Fighting Championship on February 16, 2024.

=== Results ===
BKFC Fight Night Prospects: Manassas
| Weight Class | | | | Method | Round | Time | Notes |
|---|---|---|---|---|---|---|---|
| Middleweight 79 kg | (United States) Brandon Shavers | def. | (Moldova) Stanislav Grosu | KO (punch) | 4 | 1:32 | |
| Middleweight 79 kg | (United States) Cameron VanCamp | def. | (United States) Micah Terrill | KO (punch) | 2 | 0:25 | |
| Heavyweight 120 kg | (United States) Zach Calmus | def. | (United States) Josh Freeman | TKO (referee stoppage) | 3 | 2:00 | |
| Heavyweight 120 kg | (Russia) Murat Kilimetov | def. | (United States) Tre Cook | KO (punch) | 2 | 0:09 | |
| Featherweight 66 kg | (United States) James Brown | def. | (Ukraine) Bovar Khanakov | TKO (doctor stoppage) | 3 | 2:00 | |
| Heavyweight 120 kg | (United States) Joseph Ray | def. | (United States) Paul Shough | KO (punch) | 2 | 1:50 | |
| Middleweight 79 kg | (United States) Shawn Brooks | def. | (United States) Jordan Christensen | KO (punch) | 3 | 0:52 | |
| W.Flyweight 57 kg | (South Africa) Crystal van Wyk | def. | (United States) Cristina Crist | Decision (unanimous) (49-46, 50-45, 49-46) | 5 | 2:00 | |
| Featherweight 66 kg | (United States) Nathan Rivera | def. | (United States) Dustin Garrett | KO (punches) | 1 | 1:22 | |
| Bantamweight 61 kg | (United States) Cary Caprio | def. | (United States) Mike Livingston | TKO (doctor stoppage) | 2 | 5:00 | |

== BKFC Fight Night Prospects: Canada ==
BKFC Prospects: Canada
- Promotion: Bare Knuckle Fighting Championship
- Date: March 2, 2024
- Venue: River Cree Resort and Casino
- City: (Canada) Alberta

BKFC Fight Night Prospects: Canada was a bare-knuckle fighting event held by Bare Knuckle Fighting Championship on March 2, 2024.

=== Results ===
BKFC Fight Night Prospects: Canada
| Weight Class | | | | Method | Round | Time | Notes |
|---|---|---|---|---|---|---|---|
| W.Flyweight 57 kg | (Canada) Jade Masson-Wong | def. | (United States) Gabrielle Roman | KO | 1 | 1:00 | |
| Welterweight 75 kg | (United States) Jeremiah Riggs | def. | (United States) Sonny Smith | TKO | 1 | 0:49 | |
| Heavyweight 120 kg | (Canada) Stan Surmacz | def. | (United States) Reuben Roundstone | KO | 3 | 1:12 | |
| Welterweight 75 kg | (Canada) Drew Stuve | def. | (Canada) Jason Kelly | TKO (doctor stoppage) | 1 | 1:11 | |
| Lightweight 70 kg | (Canada) Chad Lucanas | def. | (United States) Trai Santos | KO | 1 | 1:50 | |
| Cruiserweight 93 kg | (Canada) Sam Polk | def. | (United States) Jake Craig | KO | 1 | 1:12 | |
| Lightweight 70 kg | (Canada) Hasan Alghanim | def. | (Canada) Dalton Shtybel | KO | 2 | 1:05 | |
| Heavyweight 120 kg | (Canada) Tyler Tremblett | def. | (United States) Donnie Tice Jr. | TKO | 2 | 1:24 | |
| Featherweight 66 kg | (Canada) Robert Desharnais | def. | (Canada) Desi Johnson | KO | 1 | 0:34 | |
| Middleweight 79 kg | (Canada) Matthew Socholotiuk | def. | (Canada) Adam de Freitas | TKO | 3 | 1:13 | |

== BKFC Fight Night Miami: Davis vs. Wilson ==
BKFC Fight Night Miami: Davis vs. Wilson
- Promotion: Bare Knuckle Fighting Championship
- Date: March 15, 2024
- Venue: Dolphin Mall
- City: (United States) Miami, Florida

BKFC Fight Night Miami: Davis vs. Wilson (also known as BKFC Fight Night 12) was a bare-knuckle fighting event held by Bare Knuckle Fighting Championship on March 15, 2024.

=== Background ===
The event was headlined by Howard Davis against Sean Wilson.

=== Results ===
BKFC Fight Night Prospects: Manassas
| Weight Class | | | | Method | Round | Time | Notes |
|---|---|---|---|---|---|---|---|
| Lightweight 70 kg | (United States) Howard Davis | def. | (United States) Sean Wilson | TKO (punches) | 2 | 1:34 | |
| W.Flyweight 57 kg | (United States) Rosa Rodriguez | def. | (United States) Monica Franco | TKO (referee stoppage) | 3 | 2:00 | |
| Welterweight 75 kg | (United States) Brandon Meyer | def. | (United States) Famez | Decision (unanimous) (49-45, 48-46, 48-45) | 5 | 2:00 | |
| Light Heavyweight 84 kg | (United States) Markus Suarez | def. | (United States) Marcus Williamson | KO (punches) | 1 | 0:28 | |
| Lightweight 70 kg | (United States) Rohan Prado | def. | (United States) Ray Pell | TKO (punches) | 1 | 0:30 | |
| Light Heavyweight 84 kg | (Cuba) Eduardo Concepcion | def. | (United States) Alvin Davis | KO (punch) | 1 | 1:34 | |
| Lightweight 70 kg | (United States) Wayna Reid | def. | (United States) Jim Pulgar | Decision (unanimous) (49-46, 49-46, 49-46) | 5 | 2:00 | |
| Bantamweight 61 kg | (United States) Dameko Labon | def. | (United States) Jorge Bargallo | TKO (punches) | 1 | 1:44 | |
| Cruiserweight 93 kg | (United States) Julio Perez | def. | (United States) Korey Moegenburg | TKO (punches) | 1 | 0:30 | |

== BKFC 58 Bulgaria: Markulev vs. Kolev ==
BKFC 58 Bulgaria: Markulev vs. Kolev
- Promotion: Bare Knuckle Fighting Championship
- Date: March 22, 2024
- Venue: Arena Sofia
- City: Sofia, Bulgaria

BKFC 58 Bulgaria: Markulev vs. Kolev was a bare-knuckle fighting event held by Bare Knuckle Fighting Championship on March 22, 2024.

=== Background ===
The event was headlined by Kaloyan Kolev against Toni Markulev.

=== Results ===
BKFC 58 Bulgaria: Markulev vs. Kolev
| Weight Class | | | | Method | Round | Time | Notes |
|---|---|---|---|---|---|---|---|
| Cruiserweight 93 kg | (Bulgaria) Toni Markulev | def. | (Bulgaria) Kaloyen Kolev | Decision (unanimous) (48-46, 48-46, 48-46) | 5 | 2:00 | |
| Welterweight 75 kg | (Serbia) Vaso Bakocevic | def. | (Egypt) Ramadan Nooman | Decision (majority) (47-47, 48-46, 48-46) | 5 | 2:00 | |
| Featherweight 66 kg | (Azerbaijan) Zohrab Azimov | vs. | (Bulgaria) Veselin Ivanov | Draw (split) (48-46, 46-48, 47-47) | 5 | 2:00 | |
| Heavyweight 120 kg | (Turkey) Yunus Batan | def. | (Bulgaria) Zhivko Stoimenov | TKO | 4 | 0:21 | |
| Cruiserweight 93 kg | (Germany) Dominik Estorer | def. | (France) Steve Pasche | KO | 1 | 1:59 | |
| Heavyweight 120 kg | (Iran) Mehdi Barghi | def. | (Bulgaria) Nikolai Alexiev | KO | 1 | 1:47 | |
| Cruiserweight 93 kg | (Bulgaria) Stanoy Tabakov | def. | (Czech Republic) Petr Beranek | KO | 1 | 1:24 | |
| Lightweight 70 kg | (Bulgaria) Angel Petkov | def. | (Brazil) Felipe Maia | Decision (majority) (49-45, 49-45, 47-47) | 5 | 2:00 | |
| Featherweight 66 kg | (Bulgaria) Iliyan Adrianov | def. | (Slovakia) Tomas Vojtela | KO | 1 | 1:38 | |
Preliminary Card
| W.Flyweight 57 kg | (Germany) Nicole Schaefer | def. | (Germany) Daniela Graf | TKO (retirement) | 2 | 2:00 | |
| Lightweight 70 kg | (Austria) Ruslan Tokhtarov | def. | (Bulgaria) Zdrovko Dimitrov | Decision (unanimous) (48-47, 49-46, 48-47) | 5 | 2:00 | |
| Light Heavyweight 84 kg | (Bulgaria) Emil Enchev | def. | (Greece) Sakis Zampelos | KO | 1 | 0:38 | |

== BKFC 59 Albuquerque: Dodson vs. Aguero ==
BKFC 59 Albuquerque: Dodson vs. Aguero
- Promotion: Bare Knuckle Fighting Championship
- Date: March 29, 2024
- Venue: Tingley Coliseum
- City: (United States) Albuquerque, New Mexico, USA

BKFC 59 Albuquerque: Dodson vs. Aguero was a bare-knuckle fighting event held by Bare Knuckle Fighting Championship on March 29, 2024.

=== Background ===
The event was headlined by BKFC Flyweight Champion John Dodson against Dagoberto Aguero.

The following fighters were awarded bonuses:

- Fight of the Night: John Dodson vs. Dagoberto Aguero
- Knockout of the Night: Nick Kohring

=== Results ===
BKFC 59 Albuquerque: Dodson vs. Aguero
| Weight Class | | | | Method | Round | Time | Notes |
|---|---|---|---|---|---|---|---|
| Flyweight 57 kg | (United States) John Dodson (c) | vs. | (Dominican Republic) Dagoberto Aguero | Draw (unanimous) | 5 | 2:00 | For the BKFC Flyweight Championship. 46-46, 46-46, 46-46. |
| Middleweight 79 kg | (United States) Donald Sanchez | def. | (United States) Dallas Davison | KO | 3 | 1:19 | |
| Light Heavyweight 84 kg | (United States) Nick Kohring | def. | (United States) Kyle McElroy | KO | 1 | 0:30 | |
| Lightweight 70 kg | (United States) Ruben Warr | def. | (United States) Lorenzo Coca | KO | 1 | 1:46 | |
| Cruiserweight 93 kg | (United States) Keith Richardson | def. | (United States) Frank Lester | TKO | 1 | 1:57 | |
| Featherweight 66 kg | (United States) Marc Entenberg | def. | (United States) Van Vo | Decision (majority) | 5 | 2:00 | 47-47, 48-46, 48-46. |
| Bantamweight 61 kg | (United States) Justin Street | def. | (United States) Anthony Sanchez | Decision (unanimous) | 5 | 2:00 | 48-47, 49-46, 48-47. |
Preliminary Card
| Welterweight 75 kg | (United States) Felipe Chavez | def. | (Argentina) Leandro Torres | KO | 1 | 0:58 | |
| Heavyweight 120 kg | (United States) Manuel Otero | def. | (United States) Michael Furnier | KO | 2 | 0:42 | |
| Flyweight 57 kg | (United States) Austin Lewis | def. | (United States) Josh Richey | Decision (unanimous) | 5 | 2:00 | 48-47, 49-46, 48-47. |

== BKFC 60 Milton Keynes: Lilley vs. Tenaglia ==
BKFC 60 Milton Keynes: Lilley vs. Tenaglia
- Promotion: Bare Knuckle Fighting Championship
- Date: April 6, 2024
- Venue: Planet Ice Arena Milton Keynes
- City: Milton Keynes, England

BKFC 60 Milton Keynes: Lilley vs. Tenaglia (also known as BKFC UK 6) was a bare-knuckle fighting event held by Bare Knuckle Fighting Championship on April 6, 2024.

=== Background ===
The event will feature three title fights and is headlined by James Lilley against Franco Tenaglia for the first ever BKFC Lightweight European Championship. BKFC UK Light Heavyweight Champion Danny Christie is set to defend his title against David Round. Gary Fox will face Ellis Shephard for the vacant BKFC UK Featherweight Championship.

=== Results ===
BKFC 60 Milton Keynes: Lilley vs. Tenaglia
| Weight Class | | | | Method | Round | Time | Notes |
|---|---|---|---|---|---|---|---|
| Lightweight 70 kg | (Argentina) Franco Tenaglia | def. | (Wales) James Lilley | Decision (majority) | 5 | 2:00 | For the inaugural BKFC European Lightweight Championship. Judges' scorecards not read. |
| Light Heavyweight 84 kg | (United Kingdom) Danny Christie (c) | def. | (Wales) David Round | TKO | 1 | 1:38 | For the BKFC UK Light Heavyweight Championship. |
| Featherweight 66 kg | (United Kingdom) Ellis Shepherd | def. | (United Kingdom) Gary Fox | Decision (unanimous) | 5 | 2:00 | For the vacant BKFC UK Featherweight Championship. 49-46, 49-46, 49-46. |
| Light Heavyweight 84 kg | (United Kingdom) Matty Hodgson | def. | (South Africa) Chaz Wasserman | KO | 3 | 1:38 | |
| Bantamweight 61 kg | (United Kingdom) Jonno Chipchase | def. | (United Kingdom) Robbie Brown | TKO (doctor stoppage) | 1 | 2:00 | |
| Cruiserweight 93 kg | (Poland) Dawid Oskar | def. | (United Kingdom) Conor Cooke | KO | 1 | 2:00 | |
| Cruiserweight 93 kg | (United Kingdom) Rob Boardman | def. | (United Kingdom) Danny McIntosh | KO (body shot) | 1 | 1:13 | |
| Lightweight 70 kg | (United Kingdom) Ben Bonner | def. | (United Kingdom) Ray Putterill | KO (left hook) | 1 | 1:08 | |
Preliminary Card
| Middleweight 79 kg | (United Kingdom) Toby Bindon | def. | (United Kingdom) Marcus Pond | TKO | 2 | 1:44 | |
| Heavyweight 120 kg | (United Kingdom) Jack Draper | def. | (Germany) Bubu | TKO | 1 | 1:41 | |
| Lightweight 70 kg | (United Kingdom) Bartek Kanabey | def. | (United Kingdom) Bakhtyor Kudratov | TKO (referee stoppage) | 1 | 0:54 | |

== BKFC Fight Night Clearwater: Richman vs. Lozano ==
BKFC Fight Night Clearwater: Richman vs. Lozano
- Promotion: Bare Knuckle Fighting Championship
- Date: April 12, 2024
- Venue: Bert's Barracuda Harley-Davidson
- City: (United States) Clearwater, Florida

BKFC Fight Night Clearwater: Richman vs. Lozano (also known as BKFC Fight Night 13) was a bare-knuckle fighting event held by Bare Knuckle Fighting Championship on April 12, 2024.

=== Background ===
The event was headlined by former Interim BKFC Light Heavyweight Champion Mike Richman against Erick Lozano.

=== Results ===
BKFC Fight Night Clearwater: Richman vs. Lozano
| Weight Class | | | | Method | Round | Time | Notes |
|---|---|---|---|---|---|---|---|
| Light Heavyweight 84 kg | (United States) Mike Richman | def. | (United States) Erick Lozano | TKO | 5 | 0:53 | |
| Welterweight 75 kg | (Puerto Rico) Elvin Brito | def. | (United States) Ja'Far Fortt | TKO | 1 | 0:40 | |
| Flyweight 57 kg | (United States) Tyler Randall | def. | (Philippines) JR Ridge | Decision (split) (49-46, 47-48, 48-47) | 5 | 2:00 | |
| Bantamweight 61 kg | (Puerto Rico) Abdiel Velazquez | def. | (United States) Travis Thompson | KO | 1 | 1:03 | |
| Middleweight 79 kg | (United States) Jay Jackson | def. | (United States) Idris Wasi | TKO (referee stoppage) | 3 | 2:00 | |
| W.Featherweight 66 kg | (United States) Jessica Borga | def. | (Germany) Katharina Lehner | KO | 1 | 0:41 | |
| Middleweight 79 kg | (United States) Mike Heckert | def. | (United States) Leonel Carrerra | TKO (referee stoppage) | 2 | 2:00 | |
| Lightweight 70 kg | (United States) Angel Hernandez | def. | (United States) Rayne Wells | KO | 1 | 0:08 | |
| Featherweight 66 kg | (United States) Quentin Gaskins | def. | (United States) Zachary Pannell | TKO | 1 | 2:00 | |

== BKFC Knucklemania IV ==
BKFC Knucklemania IV
- Promotion: Bare Knuckle Fighting Championship
- Date: April 27, 2024
- Venue: Peacock Theater
- City: (United States) Los Angeles, California

BKFC Knucklemania IV was a bare-knuckle fighting event held by Bare Knuckle Fighting Championship on April 27, 2024.

=== Background ===
The event was headlined by King of Violence Champion Mike Perry against former BKFC Middleweight Champion Thiago Alves. BKFC Cruiserweight World Champion and BKFC Light Heavyweight World Champion Lorenzo Hunt challenged BKFC Heavyweight World Champion Mick Terrill for the Heavyweight Championship in the co-main event. Former UFC fighter Todd Duffee debuted with the organization against Ben Rothwell. Former WBO interim light middleweight boxing champion Alfredo Angulo made his debut against Jeremiah Riggs.

=== Aftermath ===
At the event, Founder David Feldman announced that Conor McGregor and his company "McGregor Sports and Entertainment" were now part owners of BKFC. Feldman announced that the venue was almost sold out at a little over 7,100 in attendance. Feldman also stated twelve additional unannounced bonuses would be given to the boxers.

The following were the announced bonuses:

- Fight of the Night: David Diaz vs. Shane Jordan
- Knockout of the Night: Alfredo Angulo

=== Results ===
BKFC Knucklemania IV
| Weight Class | | | | Method | Round | Time | Notes |
|---|---|---|---|---|---|---|---|
| Light Heavyweight 84 kg | (United States) Mike Perry | def. | (United States) Thiago Alves | TKO (punches) | 1 | 1:00 | |
| Heavyweight 120 kg | (United Kingdom) Mick Terrill (c) | def. | (United States) Lorenzo Hunt | TKO (injury) | 1 | 1:48 | For the BKFC World Heavyweight Championship. |
| Heavyweight 120 kg | (United States) Ben Rothwell | def. | (United States) Todd Duffee | TKO (injury) | 1 | 0:43 | |
| Middleweight 79 kg | (Mexico) Alfredo Angulo | def. | (United States) Jeremiah Riggs | KO (punches) | 1 | 1:07 | |
| Middleweight 79 kg | (United States) Julian Lane | def. | (Russia) Evgeny Kurdanov | TKO (doctor’s stoppage) | 1 | 2:00 | |
| W.Bantamweight 61 kg | (United States) Crystal Pittman | def. | (United States) Sydney Smith | TKO (punches) | 1 | 0:48 | |
| Bantamweight 61 kg | (United States) David Diaz | vs. | (United States) Shane Jordan | Draw (unanimous) (47-47, 47-47, 47-47) | 5 | 2:00 | |
| Lightweight 70 kg | (United States) Andrew Angelicor | def. | (United States) Ruben Warr | Decision (split) (47-48, 49-46, 48-47) | 5 | 2:00 | |
| Bantamweight 61 kg | (United States) Daniel Alvarez | def. | (United States) Victor Rosas | TKO (doctor’s stoppage) | 4 | 2:00 | |
Preliminary Card
| Middleweight 79 kg | (United States) Vincent Familari | def. | (United States) Fernando Gonzalez | Decision (unanimous) (49-46, 50-45, 49-46) | 5 | 2:00 | |
| Lightweight 70 kg | (United States) Tommy Aaron | def. | (United States) Richard Brooks | TKO (punches) | 2 | 1:14 | |
| Cruiserweight 93 kg | (United States) Keith Richardson | def. | (United States) Cody Vidal | TKO (doctor’s stoppage) | 2 | 2:00 | |

== BKFC 61 Connecticut: Rivera vs. Straus ==
BKFC 61 Connecticut: Rivera vs. Straus
- Promotion: Bare Knuckle Fighting Championship
- Date: May 11, 2024
- Venue: Mohegan Sun
- City: (United States) Uncasville, Connecticut
- Attendance: 5,300

BKFC 61 Connecticut: Rivera vs. Straus is a bare-knuckle fighting event held by Bare Knuckle Fighting Championship on May 11, 2024.

=== Background ===
Former UFC fighter Jimmie Rivera was featured in the main event against two-time Bellator Featherweight World Champion Daniel Straus.

The main event was scheduled to be a women's bantamweight bout with former WBO female featherweight boxing champion Heather Hardy in her debut taking on BKFC Women's Flyweight Champion Christine Ferea. However, due to health issues relating to Hardy, the bout was scrapped. This pushed the Rivera vs. Straus bout to the main event.

Former UFC fighter Michael Trizano and former Bellator MMA fighter Derek Campos were set to face each other in their BKFC debuts. However, in early May 2024, the bout was removed for unknown reasons. Trizano ended up facing Louie Lopez instead.

Former Bellator MMA lightweight title contender Rick Hawn made his debut at this event as well. Former UFC fighter Louis Gaudinot was expected to face Sean Santella, but the bout was removed for unknown reasons on April 24, 2024.

=== Bonus awards ===
The following fighters were awarded bonuses:

- Fight of the Night: Zach Calmus vs. Connor McKenna
- Knockout of the Night: Michael Trizano

BKFC 61 Connecticut: Rivera vs. Straus
| Weight Class | | | | Method | Round | Time | Notes |
|---|---|---|---|---|---|---|---|
| Featherweight 66 kg | (United States) Jimmie Rivera | def. | (United States) Daniel Straus | Decision (unanimous) (50-45, 48-47, 50-45) | 5 | 2:00 | |
| Lightweight 70 kg | (United States) Michael Trizano | def. | (United States) Louie Lopez | KO (punches) | 1 | 1:02 | |
| Bantamweight 61 kg | (United States) Ryan Reber | def. | (United States) Anthony Foye | Decision (unanimous) (49-46, 50-45, 48-47) | 5 | 2:00 | |
| W.Strawweight 52 kg | (United States) Sarah Click | def. | (United States) Natalie Gage | TKO (doctor stoppage) | 2 | 2:00 | |
| Welterweight 75 kg | (United States) Rick Hawn | def. | (United States) Stephen Stengel | KO (punch) | 1 | 0:35 | |
| Heavyweight 120 kg | (United States) Zach Calmus | def. | (United States) Connor McKenna | KO (punch) | 3 | 1:49 | |
| Heavyweight 120 kg | (United States) Pat Brady | def. | (United States) Lewis Rumsey | TKO (punches) | 2 | 1:41 | |
Preliminary Card
| Heavyweight 120 kg | (United States) Scott Roberts | def. | (United States) Chris Sarro | TKO (doctor stoppage) | 1 | 0:27 | |
| Middleweight 79 kg | (United States) Pat Casey | def. | (United States) Sam Watford | Decision (unanimous) (50-43, 50-43, 50-43) | 5 | 2:00 | |
| Featherweight 66 kg | (United States) Daniel Pettit | def. | (United States) Dylan Felion | TKO (punch) | 3 | 0:36 | |

== BKFC Fight Night Omaha: Trinidad-Snake vs. Pague ==
BKFC Fight Night Omaha: Trinidad-Snake vs. Pague
- Promotion: Bare Knuckle Fighting Championship
- Date: May 17, 2024
- Venue: Liberty First Credit Union Arena
- City: (United States) Ralston, Nebraska

BKFC Fight Night Omaha: Trinidad-Snake vs. Pague (also known as BKFC Fight Night 14) was a bare-knuckle fighting event held by Bare Knuckle Fighting Championship on May 17, 2024.

=== Background ===
The event was headlined by Carlos Trinidad-Snake against Dustin Pague.

=== Results ===
BKFC Fight Night Omaha: Trinidad-Snake vs. Pague
| Weight Class | | | | Method | Round | Time | Notes |
|---|---|---|---|---|---|---|---|
| Welterweight 75 kg | (United States) Carlos Trinidad-Snake | def. | (United States) Dustin Pague | TKO | 1 | 2:00 | |
| Middleweight 79 kg | (United States) Dakota Cochrane | def. | (United States) Jeremie Holloway | KO | 2 | 0:42 | |
| Welterweight 75 kg | (Moldova) Stanislav Grosu | def. | (United States) Alonzo Martinez | TKO | 2 | 1:24 | |
| W.Strawweight 52 kg | (United States) Sarah Shell | def. | (South Africa) Crystal Van Wyk | Decision (unanimous) (50-44, 50-44, 50-44) | 5 | 2:00 | |
| Lightweight 70 kg | (United States) Bobby Taylor | def. | (United States) Ryan Roberts | Decision (unanimous) (47-46, 47-46, 48-46) | 5 | 2:00 | |
| Cruiserweight 93 kg | (United States) Ryan Braun | def. | (United States) Danny McIntosh | Decision (unanimous) (48-45, 48-45, 48-45) | 5 | 2:00 | |
| Welterweight 75 kg | (United States) Emeka Ifekandu | def. | (United States) Sean Wilson | Decision (majority) (48-46, 48-46, 47-47) | 5 | 2:00 | |
| Featherweight 66 kg | (United States) Tommy Strydom | def. | (United States) Corey Roberts | Decision (unanimous) (48-45, 48-45, 47-46) | 5 | 2:00 | |
| Featherweight 66 kg | (United States) Nate Morrow | def. | (United States) Josh Krejci | TKO | 3 | 1:59 | |
| Welterweight 75 kg | (United States) Dionisio Ramirez | def. | (United States) Kassius Kayne | KO | 1 | 1:59 | |
| Lightweight 70 kg | (Mexico) Eduardo Peralta | def. | (United States) Brandon Meyer | TKO | 4 | 1:10 | |

== BKFC Fight Night Puebla, Mexico: Rubio vs. Rey Gallegos ==
BKFC Fight Night Puebla, Mexico
- Promotion: Bare Knuckle Fighting Championship
- Date: May 25, 2024
- Venue: Auditorio Explanada Pachuca
- City: Puebla, Mexico

BKFC Fight Night Puebla, Mexico: Rubio vs. Rey Gallegos (also known as BKFC Fight Night 15) is a bare-knuckle fighting event held by Bare Knuckle Fighting Championship on May 25, 2024.

=== Background ===
The event was headlined by Rudolfo Rubio against Luis Rey Gallegos.

=== Results ===
BKFC Fight Night Puebla, Mexico: Rubio vs. Rey Gallegos
| Weight Class | | | | Method | Round | Time | Notes |
|---|---|---|---|---|---|---|---|
| Bantamweight 61 kg | (Mexico) Rudolfo Rubio | def. | (Mexico) Luis Rey Gallegos | KO (punches) | 1 | 1:35 | |
| Cruiserweight 93 kg | (Mexico) Julian Fernandez | def. | (Mexico) Lino Sánchez | TKO (doctor stoppage) | 1 | 2:00 | |
| Featherweight 66 kg | (Brazil) Donny Matos | def. | (Mexico) Román Córdova | Decision (unanimous) (50-43, 49-44, 50-43) | 5 | 2:00 | |
| Middleweight 79 kg | (Mexico) Luis Castañeda | def. | (Mexico) Rudo Tovar | Decision (unanimous) (49-44, 49-44, 48-45) | 5 | 2:00 | |
| Lightweight 70 kg | (Mexico) Carlos Giner | def. | (Mexico) Juan Alvarez | KO (right hook) | 1 | 0:32 | |
| Bantamweight 61 kg | (Mexico) Cesar Vazquez | def. | (Mexico) Eduardo Meneses | TKO | 2 | 1:50 | |
| Middleweight 79 kg | (Mexico) Sergio Perez Jimenez | vs. | (Mexico) Mario Martinez | Draw (majority) (47-47, 47-47, 48-46) | 5 | 2:00 | |
| Lightweight 70 kg | (Mexico) Roberto Sinko | def. | (Mexico) Beto Saniba | Decision (split) (48-46, 48-46, 46-48) | 5 | 2:00 | |
| Bantamweight 61 kg | (Mexico) Jose Lopez | vs. | (Venezuela) Juan Campos | Draw (split) (48-46, 46-48, 47-47) | 5 | 2:00 | |
| Flyweight 61 kg | (Mexico) Nicolas Diaz | def. | (Mexico) Marcelo Antonio Perez | Decision (unanimous) (50-45, 50-45, 50-45) | 5 | 2:00 | |

== BKFC Fight Night Prospects: Denver ==
BKFC Fight Night Prospects: Denver
- Promotion: Bare Knuckle Fighting Championship
- Date: May 31, 2024
- Venue: National Western Center
- City: (United States) Denver, Colorado

BKFC Fight Night Prospects: Denver is a bare-knuckle fighting event held by Bare Knuckle Fighting Championship on May 31, 2024.

=== Background ===
The event was headlined by Keegan Vandermeer against Sawyer Depee.

=== Results ===
BKFC Fight Night Prospects: Denver
| Weight Class | | | | Method | Round | Time | Notes |
|---|---|---|---|---|---|---|---|
| Cruiserweight 93 kg | (United States) Sawyer Depee | def. | (United States) Keegan Vandermeer | KO | 1 | 1:33 | |
| Welterweight 75 kg | (United States) Josh Huber | def. | (United States) Andrew Yates | TKO | 4 | 1:47 | |
| W.Strawweight 52 kg | (United States) Cristina Crist | def. | (United States) Cassie Robb | TKO | 2 | 0:52 | |
| Featherweight 66 kg | (United States) Dylan Schulte | def. | (United States) Robert Armas | TKO | 1 | 0:32 | |
| Lightweight 70 kg | (United States) Ramiro Figueroa | def. | (United States) Brett Hudson | TKO | 2 | 2:00 | |
| Welterweight 75 kg | (United States) Derrick Findley | def. | (United States) Sergio Lopez | TKO | 3 | 0:57 | |
| Welterweight 75 kg | (United States) Zebulin Vincent | def. | (United States) Casey Moses | TKO | 3 | 2:00 | |
| Cruiserweight 93 kg | (United States) Joseph Creer | def. | (United Kingdom) Danny Mitchell | TKO | 2 | 1:08 | |
| Light Heavyweight 84 kg | (United States) Matt Maestas | def. | (United States) Jessie Stalder | KO | 1 | 0:44 | |

== BKFC Fight Night Prospects: Newcastle ==
BKFC Fight Night Prospects: Newcastle
- Promotion: Bare Knuckle Fighting Championship
- Date: June 8, 2024
- Venue: Walker Activity Dome
- City: Newcastle upon Tyne, England

BKFC Fight Night Prospects: Newcastle (also known as BKFC UK 7) is a bare-knuckle fighting event held by Bare Knuckle Fighting Championship on June 8, 2024.

=== Background ===
The event was headlined by Paul Venis against former World Sambo Championships silver medalist Stanov Tabakov.

=== Results ===
BKFC Fight Night Prospects: Newcastle
| Weight Class | | | | Method | Round | Time | Notes |
|---|---|---|---|---|---|---|---|
| Cruiserweight 93 kg | (United Kingdom) Paul Venis | def. | (Bulgaria) Stanoy Tabakov | TKO | 3 | 0:47 | |
| Light Heavyweight 84 kg | (United Kingdom) Pic Jardine | def. | (Poland) Bartlomiej Krol | TKO | 3 | 0:35 | |
| Middleweight 79 kg | (United Kingdom) Danny Christie | def. | (United Kingdom) Jimmy Millar | Decision (unanimous) | 5 | 2:00 | 50-44, 49-45, 49-44. |
| Light Heavyweight 84 kg | (United Kingdom) Danny Moir | def. | (United Kingdom) John Ferguson | Decision (split) | 5 | 2:00 | Judges' scorecards not read. |
| Lightweight 70 kg | (United Kingdom) Jack Culshaw | def. | (United Kingdom) Bartek Kanabey | TKO | 3 | 1:35 | |
| Bantamweight 61 kg | (United Kingdom) Cameron Hardy | def. | (United Kingdom) Bryan Creighton | KO | 5 | 0:43 | |
| Cruiserweight 93 kg | (United Kingdom) Stevie Taylor | def. | (United Kingdom) Jakub Kosicki | TKO | 4 | 1:51 | |
| Bantamweight 61 kg | (United Kingdom) Bradley Taylor | def. | (United Kingdom) Dan Mohammed | TKO | 1 | 0:43 | |
| Heavyweight 120 kg | (United Kingdom) Gary Slator | def. | (United Kingdom) Rob Cunningham | TKO (punches) | 1 | 0:56 | |
| Welterweight 75 kg | (United Kingdom) Luke Beamish | def. | (United Kingdom) Will Rochester | Decision (unanimous) | 5 | 2:00 | Judges' scorecards not read. |
| Welterweight 75 kg | (United Kingdom) Ryan Sanson | def. | (United Kingdom) Jeremy Waltron | Decision (unanimous) | 5 | 2:00 | Judges' scorecards not read. |

== BKFC 62 Hollywood, FL: Stewart vs. Duran ==
BKFC 62 Hollywood, FL: Stewart vs. Duran
- Promotion: Bare Knuckle Fighting Championship
- Date: June 21, 2024
- Venue: Seminole Hard Rock Hotel & Casino Hollywood
- City: (United States) Hollywood, Florida
- Attendance: 6,766

BKFC 62 Hollywood, FL: Stewart vs. Duran was a bare-knuckle fighting event held by Bare Knuckle Fighting Championship on June 21, 2024.

=== Background ===
The event was headlined by BKFC Featherweight Champion Kai Stewart against Bryan Duran for the featherweight championship. The co-main event featured a BKFC Bantamweight Championship title bout between champion Keith Richardson and Alberto Blas. In a third championship bout, Jared Warren faced Jomi Escoboza for the vacant BKFC Light Heavyweight Championship.

=== Bonus awards ===
The following fighters were awarded bonuses:

- Fight of the Night: Kai Stewart vs. Bryan Duran
- Knockout of the Night: Leonardo Perdomo
- Performance of the Night: Alberto Blas
- Tough Motherf****r Award: Josh Zuckerman

=== Results ===
BKFC 62 Hollywood, FL: Stewart vs. Duran
| Weight Class | | | | Method | Round | Time | Notes |
|---|---|---|---|---|---|---|---|
| Featherweight 66 kg | (United States) Kai Stewart (c) | def. | (Cuba) Bryan Duran | Decision (unanimous) | 5 | 2:00 | For the BKFC Featherweight Championship. 49-44, 49-44, 49-44 |
| Bantamweight 61 kg | (Cuba) Alberto Blas | def. | (United States) Keith Richardson (c) | TKO | 1 | 1:10 | For the BKFC Bantamweight Championship. |
| Light Heavyweight 84 kg | (United States) Jared Warren | def. | (Dominican Republic) Jomi Escoboza | Decision (unanimous) | 5 | 2:00 | For the vacant BKFC Light Heavyweight Championship. 50-42, 50-42, 49-43 |
| Bantamweight 61 kg | (United States) Justin Ibarrola | def. | (United States) Rick Caruso | TKO | 2 | 1:28 | |
| W.Flyweight 57 kg | (United States) Christine Vicens | def. | (United Kingdom) Melanie Shah | TKO | 1 | 2:00 | |
| Bantamweight 61 kg | (Cuba) Gee Perez | def. | (United States) Albert Inclan | KO | 5 | 0:54 | |
| Bantamweight 61 kg | (United States) Chris Garcia | def. | (United States) Mike Livingston | TKO | 2 | 1:29 | |
| Featherweight 66 kg | (Nicaragua) Edgard Plazaola | def. | (United States) Eric Dodson | TKO | 4 | 0:38 | |
| Heavyweight 120 kg | (Cuba) Leonardo Perdomo | def. | (United States) Leo Bercier | TKO | 1 | 1:40 | |
Preliminary Card
| Welterweight 75 kg | (United States) Wayna Reid | def. | (United States) Peter Peraza | Decision (split) | 5 | 2:00 | 49-46, 48-47, 47-48 |
| Welterweight 75 kg | (United States) Josh Zuckerman | def. | (Cuba) Yosdenis Cedeno | TKO | 4 | 0:31 | |
| Light Heavyweight 84 kg | (United States) David Simpson | def. | (United States) Markus Suarez | TKO | 1 | 1:03 | |

== BKFC Fight Night Pechanga: Peralta vs. Warr ==
BKFC Fight Night Pechanga: Peralta vs. Warr
- Promotion: Bare Knuckle Fighting Championship
- Date: July 12, 2024
- Venue: Pechanga Resort Casino
- City: (United States) Temecula, California

BKFC Fight Night Pechanga: Peralta vs. Warr (also known as BKFC Fight Night 16) was a bare-knuckle fighting event held by Bare Knuckle Fighting Championship on July 12, 2024.

=== Background ===
The event was headlined by Robbie Peralta against Ruben Warr. Rizin Japanese kickboxer and bareknuckle boxer Tatsuki Shinotsuka was scheduled to make his debut against Cary Caprio, but the bout was removed for unknown reasons.

=== Results ===
BKFC Fight Night Pechanga: Peralta vs. Warr
| Weight Class | | | | Method | Round | Time | Notes |
|---|---|---|---|---|---|---|---|
| Lightweight 70 kg | (United States) Ruben Warr | def. | (United States) Robbie Peralta | KO | 1 | 0:06 | |
| Light Heavyweight 84 kg | (United States) Fernando Gonzalez | def. | (United States) Rodney Thomas | Decision (unanimous) (49-46, 49-46, 48-47) | 5 | 2:00 | |
| Bantamweight 61 kg | (United States) Victor Rosas | def. | (United States) Luis Iniguez | Decision (split) (47-48, 49-46, 48-47) | 5 | 2:00 | |
| Middleweight 79 kg | (United States) Jordan Christensen | def. | (United States) Riley Pellegrino | TKO | 2 | 2:00 | |
| Middleweight 79 kg | (United States) Luis Villasenor | def. | (United States) Brett Fields | KO | 1 | 1:11 | |
| Flyweight 57 kg | (United States) Alexander Gutierrez | def. | (United States) Zay Garcia | Decision (unanimous) (49-46, 49-46, 50-45) | 5 | 2:00 | |
| Lightweight 70 kg | (United States) Squire Redfern | def. | (United States) Richard Brooks | TKO | 5 | 0:53 | |
| Featherweight 66 kg | (United States) Van Vo | def. | (United States) Dan Pettit | KO | 1 | 0:57 | |
| Heavyweight 120 kg | (United States) Joseph White | def. | (United States) Caleb Jacob Avila | KO | 3 | 1:04 | |
| Bantamweight 61 kg | (United States) Mike Hansen | def. | (United States) Anthony Yost | TKO | 1 | 1:46 | |

== BKFC 63 Sturgis: Hart vs. Starling ==
BKFC 63 Sturgis: Hart vs. Starling
- Promotion: Bare Knuckle Fighting Championship
- Date: August 3, 2024
- Venue: Buffalo Chip Campground
- City: (United States) Sturgis, South Dakota

BKFC 63 Sturgis: Hart vs. Starling is an upcoming bare-knuckle fighting event to be held by Bare Knuckle Fighting Championship on August 3, 2024.

=== Background ===
The event is expected to be headlined by a BKFC Women's Strawweight Championship bout between current champion Britain Hart against Taylor Starling.

A Light Heavyweight bout between Joe Riggs and Joseph Creer was scheduled for this event. However, the bout was removed for unknown reasons.

=== Results ===
BKFC 63 Sturgis: Hart vs. Starling
| Weight Class | | | | Method | Round | Time | Notes |
|---|---|---|---|---|---|---|---|
| W. Strawweight 52 kg | (United States) Britain Hart (c) | def. | (United States) Taylor Starling | Decision (unanimous) (48-47, 49-46, 48-47) | 5 | 2:00 | For the BKFC Women's Strawweight Championship. |
| Heavyweight 120 kg | (United States) Sam Shewmaker | def. | (United States) Josh Burns | Decision (unanimous) (49-45, 49-45, 49-45) | 5 | 2:00 | |
| Light Heavyweight 84 kg | (United States) Josh Dyer | def. | (United States) William Albrecht | KO | 1 | 0:46 | |
| Cruiserweight 93 kg | (United States) Bryant Acheson | def. | (United States) Joseph Creer | Decision (unanimous) (49-44, 50-43, 49-44) | 5 | 2:00 | |
| Bantamweight 61 kg | (United States) Roberto Armas | def. | (United States) Jack Grady | TKO | 3 | 1:03 | |
| Heavyweight 120 kg | (United States) Josh Watson | def. | (United States) Reuben Roundstone | KO | 1 | 1:42 | |
| Cruiserweight 93 kg | (United States) Brandon Conley | def. | (United States) Donnie Tice Jr | KO | 3 | 1:31 | |
| Heavyweight 120 kg | (United States) Zachary Calmus | def. | (United States) Paul Shough | KO | 1 | 1:58 | |
| Featherweight 66 kg | (United States) Timmy Mason | def. | (United States) Gabriel Freyre | KO | 1 | 0:17 | |

== BKFC 64 Coventry: Tierney vs. Graham ==
BKFC 64 Coventry: Tierney vs. Graham
- Promotion: Bare Knuckle Fighting Championship
- Date: August 10, 2024
- Venue: Coventry Skydome
- City: Coventry, England

BKFC 64 Coventry: Tierney vs. Graham (also known as BKFC UK 8) was a bare-knuckle fighting event held by Bare Knuckle Fighting Championship on August 10, 2024.

=== Background ===
The event was headlined by Conor Tierney against Jonny Graham for the inaugural UK BKFC Welterweight Championship.

=== Results ===
BKFC 64 Coventry: Tierney vs. Graham
| Weight Class | | | | Method | Round | Time | Notes |
|---|---|---|---|---|---|---|---|
| Welterweight 75 kg | (United Kingdom) Connor Tierney | def. | (United Kingdom) Jonny Graham | Decision (unanimous) | 5 | 2:00 | For the inaugural UK BKFC Welterweight Championship. 48-45, 48-46, 48-45. |
| Lightweight 70 kg | (United Kingdom) Jonno Chipchase | def. | (United Kingdom) Toby Bindon | TKO | 1 | 1:58 | |
| Cruiserweight 93 kg | (United Kingdom) Conor Cooke | def. | (United Kingdom) Mason Shaw | KO | 1 | 1:34 | |
| Cruiserweight 93 kg | (United Kingdom) Rob Boardman | def. | (United Kingdom) Lee Browne | TKO | 4 | 0:47 | |
| Welterweight 75 kg | (United Kingdom) Luke Nevin | def. | (United Kingdom) Sahin Omer | Decision (unanimous) | 5 | 2:00 | 50-43, 50-43, 50-43. |
| Middleweight 79 kg | (United Kingdom) Mac Bygraves | def. | (United Kingdom) Paul O'Sullivan | Decision (split) | 5 | 2:00 | 50-47, 50-46, 47-48. |
| Middleweight 79 kg | (United Kingdom) George Thorpe | def. | (United Kingdom) Conan Barbaru | Decision (unanimous) | 5 | 2:00 | 49-45, 50-45, 49-45. |
| Lightweight 70 kg | (United Kingdom) Ryan McCarthy | def. | (United Kingdom) Alec Connelly | Decision (unanimous) | 5 | 2:00 | 50-45, 50-46, 50-45. |
| Bantamweight 61 kg | (United Kingdom) Robbie Brown | def. | (United Kingdom) Jordan Ward | Decision (unanimous) | 5 | 2:00 | 50-46, 49-46, 48-47. |
Preliminary Card
| Bantamweight 61 kg | (United Kingdom) James Dixon | def. | (United Kingdom) Tom Mowbray | TKO | 2 | 0:43 | |
| W. Bantamweight 61 kg | (Italy) Sara Bitto | def. | (Spain) Yamila Sanchez | Decision (unanimous) | 5 | 2:00 | 49-45, 50-44, 49-45. |
| Middleweight 79 kg | (United Kingdom) Simeon Ottley | def. | (United Kingdom) Connor Warden | TKO | 4 | 1:45 | |

== BKFC Fight Night Kansas City: Lindsay vs. Brito ==
BKFC Fight Night Kansas City: Lindsay vs. Brito
- Promotion: Bare Knuckle Fighting Championship
- Date: August 16, 2024
- Venue: Memorial Hall
- City: (United States) Kansas City, Kansas

BKFC Fight Night Kansas City: Lindsay vs. Brito (also known as BKFC Fight Night 17) was a bare-knuckle fighting that was held by Bare Knuckle Fighting Championship on August 16, 2024.

=== Background ===
The event was headlined by a welterweight bout between Jake Lindsey against Elvin Brito.

=== Results ===
BKFC Fight Night Kansas City: Lindsay vs. Brito
| Weight Class | | | | Method | Round | Time | Notes |
|---|---|---|---|---|---|---|---|
| Welterweight 75 kg | (United States) Jake Lindsey | def. | (Puerto Rico) Elvin Brito | Decision (unanimous) (49-46, 49-46, 49-46) | 5 | 2:00 | |
| Middleweight 79 kg | (United States) Zebulin Vincent | def. | (United States) Doug Coltrane | TKO (doctor’s stoppage) | 4 | 1:17 | |
| Lightweight 70 kg | (United States) Tyler Jones | def. | (United States) Ira Johnson | TKO | 3 | 1:06 | |
| Heavyweight 120 kg | (United States) JW Kiser | def. | (United States) Michael Furnier | TKO | 2 | 1:56 | |
| Lightweight 70 kg | (United States) Eduardo Peralta | def. | (United States) Deron Carlis | KO | 2 | 1:59 | |
| Flyweight 57 kg | (United States) Blaine Warbritton | def. | (United States) Justyn Martinez | TKO (doctor’s stoppage) | 4 | 2:00 | |
| W.Flyweight 57 kg | (United States) Charlene Gellner | def. | (United States) Karla Alvarez | TKO (doctor’s stoppage) | 3 | 2:00 | |
| Heavyweight 120 kg | (United States) Anthony Garrett | def. | (United States) John Orr | TKO | 1 | 0:16 | |
| Bantamweight 61 kg | (United States) Matt Guymon | def. | (United States) Jacob Akin | TKO (doctor’s stoppage) | 3 | 2:00 | |
| Cruiserweight 93 kg | (United States) Devon Schwan | def. | (United States) Jesse Pringle | TKO | 1 | 1:04 | |

== BKFC Fight Night Prospects: Edmonton ==
BKFC Fight Night Prospects: Edmonton
- Promotion: Bare Knuckle Fighting Championship
- Date: August 31, 2024
- Venue: River Cree Resort and Casino
- City: Enoch, Alberta, Canada

BKFC Fight Night Prospects: Edmonton was a bare-knuckle fighting event held by Bare Knuckle Fighting Championship on August 31, 2024.

=== Background ===
The event was headlined by a welterweight bout between Drew Stuve against Sonny Smith.

=== Results ===
BKFC Fight Night Prospects: Edmonton
| Weight Class | | | | Method | Round | Time | Notes |
|---|---|---|---|---|---|---|---|
| Welterweight 75 kg | (Canada) Drew Stuve | def. | (United Kingdom) Sonny Smith | TKO | 2 | 1:11 | |
| Lightweight 70 kg | (Canada) Hasan Alghanim | def. | (United States) Ryan Ibsen | TKO | 1 | 1:13 | |
| Lightweight 70 kg | (Canada) Chad Lucanas | def. | (United States) Zachary Pannell | TKO | 1 | 1:15 | |
| Heavyweight 120 kg | (Poland) Bohdan Kotok | def. | (United States) Jonathan Miller | KO | 1 | 1:02 | |
| Light Heavyweight 84 kg | (Canada) Taylor Bull | def. | (United States) Christopher Hamlett | KO | 1 | 1:05 | |
| Welterweight 75 kg | (Canada) Caeden Scott | def. | (Canada) Dan Godoy | Decision (unanimous) (48-46, 48-46, 49-45) | 5 | 2:00 | |
| W.Strawweight 52 kg | (Canada) Alexandra Delgado Lopez | def. | (United States) Jennifer Ruiz | TKO | 2 | 1:32 | |
| Cruiserweight 93 kg | (Canada) Kayden Giroux | def. | (Canada) Trevor Bozniak | TKO | 1 | 0:10 | |
| Middleweight 79 kg | (Canada) Kimani Crawford | def. | (United States) Danasabe Mohammed | Decision (unanimous) (49-46, 49-46, 50-45) | 5 | 2:00 | |
| Welterweight 75 kg | (Canada) Matthew Socholotiuk | def. | (Canada) Nash Diederichs | KO | 1 | 1:50 | |
| Featherweight 66 kg | (Canada) Robert Desharnais | def. | (United States) Glendel Futrell | TKO | 1 | 0:23 | |

== BKFC 65 Salt Lake City: Ferea vs. Masson-Wong ==
BKFC 65 Salt Lake City: Ferea vs. Masson-Wong
- Promotion: Bare Knuckle Fighting Championship
- Date: September 6, 2024
- Venue: Maverik Center
- City: (United States) Salt Lake City, Utah

BKFC 65 Salt Lake City: Ferea vs. Masson-Wong was a bare-knuckle fighting event held by Bare Knuckle Fighting Championship on September 6, 2024.

=== Background ===
The event was headlined by a BKFC Women's Flyweight Championship bout between current champion Christine Ferea against Jade Masson-Wong.

=== Bonus awards ===
The following fighters were awarded bonuses:

- Knockout of the Night: Zac Cavender
- Performance of the Night: Jeremy Stephens
- Balls of the Night: Bobby Taylor

=== Results ===
BKFC 65 Salt Lake City: Ferea vs. Masson-Wong
| Weight Class | | | | Method | Round | Time | Notes |
|---|---|---|---|---|---|---|---|
| W.Flyweight 57 kg | (United States) Christine Ferea (c) | def. | (Canada) Jade Masson-Wong | Decision (split) | 5 | 2:00 | For the BKFC Women's Flyweight Championship 49-46, 49-46, 46-49. |
| Lightweight 70 kg | (United States) Jeremy Stephens | def. | (United States) Bobby Taylor | Decision (unanimous) | 5 | 2:00 | 49-43, 49-43, 49-43. |
| Lightweight 70 kg | (United States) Drako Rodriguez | def. | (United States) Trever Bradshaw | TKO | 2 | 0:55 | |
| Light Heavyweight 84 kg | (United States) Mike Jones | def. | (Ecuador) Diego Romo | Decision (unanimous) | 5 | 2:00 | 50-44, 50-44, 50-44. |
| Heavyweight 120 kg | (United States) Alex Davis | def. | (United States) Hayden Brown | TKO | 1 | 0:20 | |
| Heavyweight 120 kg | (United States) Lewis Rumsey | def. | (United States) Jeremy Morrison | TKO | 2 | 0:36 | |
| Light Heavyweight 84 kg | (United States) Kyle McElroy | def. | (United States) Lehi Dominguez | TKO | 1 | 0:29 | |
| Welterweight 75 kg | (United States) Dominico Salas | def. | (United States) Kaine Tomlinson, Jr. | TKO | 2 | 2:00 | |
| Middleweight 79 kg | (United States) Bryan McDowell | def. | (United States) Justin McDonald | KO | 1 | 2:00 | |
Preliminary Card
| Cruiserweight 93 kg | (United States) David Sanchez | def. | (United States) Ben Robinson | KO | 1 | 0:12 | |
| Cruiserweight 93 kg | (United States) Zac Cavender | def. | (United States) Conor Bracken | KO | 1 | 0:53 | |
| Featherweight 66 kg | (United States) Brandon Honsvick | def. | (United States) Troy Dennison | TKO | 1 | 0:51 | |

== BKFC 66 Hollywood, FL: Blas vs. Reber ==
BKFC 66 Hollywood, FL: Blas vs. Reber
- Promotion: Bare Knuckle Fighting Championship
- Date: September 13, 2024
- Venue: Seminole Hard Rock Hotel & Casino Hollywood
- City: (United States) Hollywood, Florida

BKFC 66 Hollywood, FL: Blas vs. Reber was a bare-knuckle fighting event to be held by Bare Knuckle Fighting Championship on September 13, 2024.

=== Background ===
The event was headlined by BKFC Bantamweight Champion Alberto Blas against Ryan Reber for the championship. Former Strikeforce Light Heavyweight Champion, Rizin Heavyweight Grand Prix Champion and Bellator MMA Light Heavyweight World Championship challenger "King Mo" Muhammed Lawal was scheduled to come out of MMA retirement to face current BKFC Middleweight Champion David Mundell in a light heavyweight bout. However, Lawal withdrew from the bout for unknown reasons.

=== Bonus awards ===
The following fighters were awarded bonuses:

- Knockout of the Night: Leonardo Perdomo
- Performance of the Night: Howard Davis and Armando Rodriguez

=== Results ===
BKFC 66 Hollywood, FL: Blas vs. Reber
| Weight Class | | | | Method | Round | Time | Notes |
|---|---|---|---|---|---|---|---|
| Bantamweight 61 kg | (Cuba) Alberto Blas (c) | def. | (United States) Ryan Reber | KO | 1 | 0:56 | For the BKFC Bantamweight Championship. |
| Lightweight 70 kg | (United States) Howard Davis | def. | (United States) James Brown | TKO | 1 | 1:41 | |
| Heavyweight 120 kg | (Cuba) Leonardo Perdomo | def. | (United States) Steve Banks | TKO | 1 | 0:44 | |
| Bantamweight 61 kg | (United States) Justin Ibarrola | def. | (United States) Justin Street | Decision (unanimous) (49-46, 49-46, 49-46) | 5 | 2:00 | |
| Bantamweight 61 kg | (United States) Armando Rodriguez | def. | (United States) Dameko Labon | TKO | 1 | 2:00 | |
| Cruiserweight 93 kg | (United States) Stephen Townsel | def. | (South Africa) Jeremy Smith | TKO | 4 | 0:47 | |
| Middleweight 79 kg | (United States) Leonel Carrera | def. | (United States) Sean Hotusing | Decision (split) (48-47, 48-47, 46-49) | 5 | 2:00 | |
| Welterweight 75 kg | (United States) Peter Peraza | def. | (United States) Raymond Pell | TKO | 3 | 1:26 | |
| Heavyweight 120 kg | (United States) Joseph White | def. | (United States) Kendrick Miree | TKO | 4 | 0:44 | |
Preliminary Card
| Welterweight 75 kg | (United States) Jim Pulgar | def. | (United States) Joshua Alvarez | Decision (unanimous) (48-44, 48-44, 48-44) | 5 | 2:00 | |
| Cruiserweight 93 kg | (United States) Julio Perez | def. | (United States) Devonte Jeffery | KO | 1 | 0:13 | |
| Welterweight 75 kg | (Kazakhstan) Almat Jumanov | def. | (United States) Rayne Wells | TKO | 1 | 1:41 | |

== BKFC on DAZN: Tenaglia vs. Soto ==
BKFC on DAZN: Tenaglia vs. Soto
- Promotion: Bare Knuckle Fighting Championship
- Date: October 12, 2024
- Venue: Marbella Arena
- City: Marbella, Spain

BKFC on DAZN: Tenaglia vs. Soto (also known as BKFC on DAZN 1) is a bare-knuckle fighting event that was held by Bare Knuckle Fighting Championship on October 12, 2024.

=== Background ===
The event was expected to be headlined by Franco Tenaglia against Tony Soto for the vacant BKFC Lightweight Championship. A BKFC Welterweight Championship bout between current champion Austin Trout and Ricardo Franco is expected to take place.

A BKFC Middleweight Championship bout between current champion David Mundell and Danny Christie took place at this event.

MMA media personalities Oscar Willis and Ben Davis also competed in a lightweight bout at this event.

Following the main event, BKFC co-owner Conor McGregor announced that main event fighters Franco Tenaglia and Tony Soto would receive double their purses on top of receiving additional bonuses.

=== Results ===
BKFC on DAZN: Tenaglia vs. Soto
| Weight Class | | | | Method | Round | Time | Notes |
|---|---|---|---|---|---|---|---|
| Lightweight 70 kg | (Argentina) Franco Tenaglia | def. | (United States) Tony Soto | Decision (majority) (46-46, 47-45, 47-45) | 5 | 2:00 | For the vacant BKFC Lightweight Championship. |
| Welterweight 75 kg | (United States) Austin Trout (c) | def. | (United Kingdom) Ricardo Franco | Decision (unanimous) (50-43, 50-43, 50-43) | 5 | 2:00 | For the BKFC Welterweight Championship. |
| Middleweight 79 kg | (United States) David Mundell (c) | def. | (United Kingdom) Danny Christie | TKO | 2 | 0:55 | For the BKFC Middleweight Championship. |
| Featherweight 66 kg | (United Kingdom) Dan Chapman | def. | (Czech Republic) Mike Jurik | TKO | 1 | 1:26 | |
| Welterweight 75 kg | (Brazil) Felipe da Silva Maia | def. | (United Kingdom) James Lilley | TKO | 1 | 1:08 | |
| W.Featherweight 66 kg | (United Kingdom) Hannah Rankin | def. | (Germany) Deborah Melhorn | Decision (split) (49-46, 48-47, 49-46) | 5 | 2:00 | |
| Lightweight 70 kg | (United Kingdom) Oscar Stephens-Willis | def. | (United States) Ben Davis | TKO | 1 | 1:57 | |
| Middleweight 79 kg | (Turkey) Yunus Batan | def. | (France) Maxime Bellamy | Decision (unanimous) (48-47, 48-47, 48-47) | 5 | 2:00 | |
Preliminary Card
| Featherweight 66 kg | (Spain) Nico Gaffie | def. | (Czech Republic) Radek Štádler | TKO | 2 | 1:04 | |
| Heavyweight 120 kg | (Austria) Arbi Chakaev | def. | (Spain) Jose Daniel | TKO | 1 | 0:59 | |
| Lightweight 70 kg | (Spain) David Mora | def. | (Spain) Fran Suarez | TKO (doctor stoppage) | 4 | 2:00 | |

== BKFC 67 Denver: Camozzi vs. Depee ==
BKFC 67 Denver: Camozzi vs. Depee
- Promotion: Bare Knuckle Fighting Championship
- Date: October 25, 2024
- Venue: Denver Coliseum
- City: (United States) Denver, Colorado

BKFC 67 Denver: Camozzi vs. Depee was a bare-knuckle fighting event held by Bare Knuckle Fighting Championship on October 25, 2024.

=== Background ===
The event was headlined by Chris Camozzi against Sawyer Depee for the vacant BKFC Cruiserweight Championship.

=== Results ===
BKFC 67 Denver: Camozzi vs. Depee
| Weight Class | | | | Method | Round | Time | Notes |
|---|---|---|---|---|---|---|---|
| Cruiserweight 93 kg | (United States) Chris Camozzi | def. | (United States) Sawyer Depee | KO | 1 | 1:06 | For the vacant BKFC Cruiserweight Championship. |
| Welterweight 75 kg | (United States) Cameron VanCamp | def. | (United States) Brandon Girtz | Decision (split) (48-47, 48-47, 46-49) | 5 | 2:00 | |
| Middleweight 79 kg | (United States) Marcus Edwards | def. | (United States) Pat Casey | Decision (unanimous) (50-43, 50-43, 50-42) | 5 | 2:00 | |
| Lightweight 70 kg | (United States) Ramiro Figueroa | def. | (United States) Carl Deaton III | TKO | 1 | 2:00 | |
| Bantamweight 61 kg | (United States) Dylan Schulte | def. | (United States) Derek Perez | TKO | 2 | 1:54 | |
| W.Strawweight 52 kg | (United States) Kat Paprocki | def. | (United States) Sydney Smith | TKO | 4 | 1:57 | |
| Flyweight 57 kg | (United States) Andrew Strode | def. | (United States) Chance Wilson | TKO | 3 | 1:13 | |
| Welterweight 75 kg | (United States) Andrew Yates | def. | (United States) JorDan Christensen | Decision (unanimous) (49-45. 49-45. 48-46) | 5 | 2:00 | |
Preliminary Card
| Lightweight 70 kg | (Canada) Hasan Al-Ghanim | def. | (United States) Dusty Sparks | Decision (unanimous) (48-47, 49-45, 48-46) | 5 | 2:00 | |
| Lightweight 70 kg | (Canada) Nash Diederichs | def. | (United States) Ruben Arroyo | TKO | 1 | 1:28 | |

== BKFC Fight Night Prospects: Myrtle Beach ==
BKFC Fight Night Prospects: Myrtle Beach
- Promotion: Bare Knuckle Fighting Championship
- Date: October 26, 2024
- Venue: John T. Rhodes Myrtle Beach Sports Center
- City: (United States) Myrtle Beach, South Carolina

BKFC Fight Night Prospects: Myrtle Beach was a bare-knuckle fighting event held by Bare Knuckle Fighting Championship on October 26, 2024.

=== Background ===
The event was headlined by Brandon Bushaw against Rick Caruso.

=== Results ===
BKFC Fight Night Prospects: Myrtle Beach
| Weight Class | | | | Method | Round | Time | Notes |
|---|---|---|---|---|---|---|---|
| Lightweight 70 kg | (United States) Rick Caruso | def. | (United States) Brandon Bushaw | KO | 2 | 0:48 | |
| Lightweight 70 kg | (United States) Jeremiah Scott | def. | (United States) Dakota Highpine | KO | 1 | 1:52 | |
| Cruiserweight 93 kg | (United States) Lewis Glover | def. | (United States) Justin Howell | TKO | 2 | 1:32 | |
| Featherweight 66 kg | (United States) Jairo Santos | def. | (United States) CJ Dean | TKO | 2 | 1:28 | |
| Middleweight 79 kg | (United States) Rickie Mcconnicio | def. | (United States) Adrian Delacruz | Decision (split) | 5 | 2:00 | |
| Heavyweight 120 kg | (United States) Sarry Pierre | def. | (United States) Alex Govea | Decision (split) | 5 | 2:00 | |
| Lightweight 70 kg | (United States) Chango Romero | def. | (United States) Jackson Whitley | Decision (split) | 5 | 2:00 | |

== BKFC 68 Newcastle: Faulkner vs. Oscar ==
BKFC 68 Newcastle: Faulkner vs. Oscar
- Promotion: Bare Knuckle Fighting Championship
- Date: November 2, 2024
- Venue: Utilita Arena
- City: Newcastle upon Tyne, England

BKFC 68 Newcastle: Faulkner vs. Oscar (also known as BKFC UK 9) is a bare-knuckle fighting event held by Bare Knuckle Fighting Championship on November 2, 2024.

=== Background ===
The event was headlined by a European BKFC Heavyweight Championship between Agi Faulkner and Dawid Oskar. A UK BKFC Light Heavyweight Championship bout between Matty Hodgson and Conor Cooke took place as well.

=== Results ===
BKFC 68 Newcastle: Faulkner vs. Oscar
| Weight Class | | | | Method | Round | Time | Notes |
|---|---|---|---|---|---|---|---|
| Heavyweight 120 kg | (United Kingdom) Agi Faulkner | def. | (United Kingdom) Dawid Oskar | KO | 2 | 0:05 | For the inaugural European BKFC Heavyweight Championship. |
| Light Heavyweight 84 kg | (Republic of Ireland) Conor Cooke | def. | (United Kingdom) Matty Hodgson | Decision (unanimous) | 5 | 2:00 | For the vacant UK BKFC Light Heavyweight Championship. |
| Lightweight 70 kg | (United Kingdom) Ben Bonner | def. | (United Kingdom) Lewis Keen | KO | 1 | 1:44 | |
| Cruiserweight 93 kg | (United Kingdom) Karl Thompson | vs. | (United Kingdom) Dawid Chylinski | TKO | 3 | 1:25 | |
| Light Heavyweight 84 kg | (United Kingdom) Anthony Holmes | def. | (South Africa) Chaz Wasserman | KO | 2 | 1:33 | |
| Middleweight 79 kg | (United Kingdom) Matthew Wiwczaryk | def. | (Poland) Bartlomiej Krol | Decision (unanimous) (49-45, 49-45, 49-45) | 5 | 2:00 | |
| Featherweight 66 kg | (United Kingdom) Gary Fox | def. | (United Kingdom) Morgan Starkey | TKO | 2 | 0:54 | |
| Bantamweight 61 kg | (United Kingdom) Bradley Taylor | def. | (United Kingdom) Robbie Brown | Decision (unanimous) (50-40, 50-40, 50-42) | 5 | 2:00 | |
| Welterweight 75 kg | (United Kingdom) Luke Beamish | def. | (United Kingdom) Paul Cook | Decision (unanimous) (48-47, 49-46, 48-47) | 5 | 2:00 | |
| Heavyweight 120 kg | (United Kingdom) Matty Hill | def. | (United Kingdom) Lee Browne | TKO | 2 | 1:48 | |
| Middleweight 79 kg | (United Kingdom) Danny Moir | def. | (United Kingdom) Kyle Redfearn | TKO (doctor stoppage) | 2 | 1:51 | |

== BKFC on DAZN Montana: Stewart vs. Rivera ==
BKFC on DAZN Montana: Stewart vs. Rivera
- Promotion: Bare Knuckle Fighting Championship
- Date: November 9, 2024
- Venue: First Interstate Arena
- City: (United States) Billings, Montana

BKFC on DAZN Montana: Stewart vs. Rivera (also known as BKFC on DAZN 2) is a bare-knuckle fighting event to be held by Bare Knuckle Fighting Championship on November 9, 2024.

=== Background ===
A BKFC Featherweight Championship bout between champion Kai Stewart and former UFC fighter Jimmie Rivera is scheduled to headline the event.

=== Results ===
BKFC on DAZN Montana: Stewart vs. Rivera
| Weight Class | | | | Method | Round | Time | Notes |
|---|---|---|---|---|---|---|---|
| Featherweight 66 kg | (United States) Kai Stewart | vs. | (United States) Jimmie Rivera | Decision (unanimous) (50-45, 49-46, 50-45) | 5 | 2:00 | For the BKFC Featherweight Championship. |
| Welterweight 75 kg | (Mexico) Alfredo Angulo | vs. | (United States) Julian Lane | Decision (unanimous) (49-46, 48-47, 49-46) | 5 | 2:00 | |
| Middleweight 79 kg | (United States) Carlos Trinidad-Snake | def. | (United States) Zach Juusola | TKO | 3 | 0:56 | |
| Featherweight 66 kg | (United States) Brandon Allen | def. | (United States) Timmy Mason | TKO | 3 | 0:38 | |
| Cruiserweight 93 kg | (United States) Bryant Acheson | vs. | (United States) Scott Roberts | TKO | 1 | 0:48 | |
| Heavyweight 120 kg | (United States) Corey Willis | def. | (United States) Brady Meister | TKO | 1 | 1:01 | |
| Welterweight 75 kg | (United States) Dallas Davison | def. | (United States) Christian Torres | TKO (doctor stoppage) | 1 | 2:00 | |
| Featherweight 66 kg | (United States) Louie Lopez | def. | (United States) Robert Armas | Decision (unanimous) (50-45, 50-45, 50-45) | 5 | 2:00 | |
Preliminary Card
| W.Strawweight 52 kg | (United States) Natalie Gage | def. | (United States) Gabrielle Roman | Decision (unanimous) (48-47, 49-46, 48-47) | 5 | 2:00 | |
| Cruiserweight 93 kg | (United States) Leo Bercier | def. | (United States) Drew Nolan | KO | 1 | 1:42 | |
| Bantamweight 61 kg | (United States) Elijah Jamerson | def. | (United States) AJ Craig | TKO | 1 | 1:39 | |

== BKFC Fight Night Los Angeles: Warr vs. Khanakov ==
BKFC Fight Night Los Angeles: Warr vs. Khanakov
- Promotion: Bare Knuckle Fighting Championship
- Date: November 23, 2024
- Venue: Thunder Studios
- City: (United States) Los Angeles, California

BKFC Fight Night Los Angeles: Warr vs. Khanakov (also known as BKFC Fight Night 18) was a bare-knuckle fighting event held by Bare Knuckle Fighting Championship on November 23, 2024.

=== Background ===
The event was headlined by a lightweight bout between Ruben Warr and Bovar Khanakov.

=== Results ===
BKFC Fight Night Los Angeles: Warr vs. Khanakov
| Weight Class | | | | Method | Round | Time | Notes |
|---|---|---|---|---|---|---|---|
| Lightweight 70 kg | (Ukraine) Bovar Khanakov | def. | (United States) Ruben Warr | Decision (unanimous) (50-45, 50-45, 49-46) | 5 | 2:00 | |
| Heavyweight 120 kg | (United States) Anthony Garrett | def. | (United States) Lavar Johnson | KO | 1 | 0:12 | |
| Cruiserweight 93 kg | (United States) Brandon Conley | def. | (United States) Keith Richardson | TKO (doctor stoppage) | 2 | 2:00 | |
| Heavyweight 120 kg | (United States) Chase Gormley | def. | (United States) Tylor Sijohn | TKO | 2 | 0:54 | |
| Middleweight 79 kg | (United States) Danasabe Mohammed | def. | (United States) Rodney Thomas | TKO | 2 | 0:09 | |
| Welterweight 75 kg | (United States) Ryan Petersen | def. | (Canada) Dan Godoy | TKO | 2 | 2:00 | |
| Middleweight 79 kg | (United States) Michael Manno | def. | (United States) Vincent Familari | TKO | 4 | 2:00 | |
| Flyweight 57 kg | (United States) Mike Hansen | vs. | (United States) Dominick Carey | TKO | 1 | 1:47 | |
| Middleweight 79 kg | (United States) Steven Sainsbury | def. | (United States) Paulo Games | TKO | 1 | 1:26 | |
| Light Heavyweight 84 kg | (United States) Cody Vidal | def. | (United States) Kevin Sims | TKO | 2 | 1:48 | |

== BKFC 69 Atlanta: Richardson vs. Larrimore ==
BKFC 69 Atlanta: Richardson vs. Larrimore
- Promotion: Bare Knuckle Fighting Championship
- Date: December 6, 2024
- Venue: Gas South Arena
- City: (United States) Duluth, Georgia

BKFC 69 Atlanta: Richardson vs. Larrimore was bare-knuckle fighting event held by Bare Knuckle Fighting Championship on December 6, 2024.

=== Background ===
The event was headlined by a bantamweight bout between former BKFC Bantamweight World Champion Keith Richardson and Michael Larrimore. Former UFC fighter Nate Maness also made his BKFC debut against Nick Burgos.

Aftermath

Justin Watson's knockout of Cole Ferrell was recorded at 2.9 seconds, which is the fastest knockout in BKFC and combat sports history.

=== Results ===
BKFC 69 Atlanta: Richardson vs. Larrimore
| Weight Class | | | | Method | Round | Time | Notes |
|---|---|---|---|---|---|---|---|
| Bantamweight 61 kg | (United States) Keith Richardson | def. | (United States) Michael Larrimore | KO | 1 | 0:21 | |
| Welterweight 75 kg | (United States) Derrick Findley | def. | (United States) Joe Elmore | Decision (split) (48-47, 48-47, 46-49) | 5 | 2:00 | |
| Bantamweight 61 kg | (United States) Nate Maness | def. | (United States) Nick Burgos | TKO | 3 | 1:59 | |
| Featherweight 66 kg | (United States) Nathan Rivera | def. | (United States) Justin Street | Decision (unanimous) (50-44, 50-44, 50-44) | 5 | 2:00 | |
| Heavyweight 120 kg | (United States) Joe Ray | def. | (United States) Dexter Carthon | KO | 3 | 1:08 | |
| Light Heavyweight 84 kg | (United States) Joseph Creer | def. | (United States) David Simpson | Decision (unanimous) (49-45, 49-45, 50-44) | 5 | 2:00 | |
| W.Strawweight 52 kg | (South Africa) Crystal Van Wyk | def. | (United States) Emma Murray | Decision (unanimous) (48-47, 48-47, 48-47) | 5 | 2:00 | |
| Featherweight 66 kg | (United States) Justin Watson | def. | (United States) Cole Ferrell | KO | 1 | 0:03 | Fastest KO in combat sports history |
Preliminary Card
| Heavyweight 120 kg | (United States) Braxton Smith | def. | (United States) Alex Davis | TKO | 3 | 0:57 | |
| Bantamweight 61 kg | (United States) Samuel Samples | def. | (United States) Mike Livingston | KO | 1 | 1:08 | |
| Light Heavyweight 84 kg | (United States) Daniel Cooper | def. | (United States) Louis Brewington | TKO | 1 | 1:58 | |
| Lightweight 70 kg | (United States) Josh Marer | def. | (United States) Kenny Hill | | | | Non-televised bout. |
| Light Heavyweight 84 kg | (United States) Harrison Aiken | def. | (United States) Idrees Wasi | | | | Non-televised bout. |

== BKFC on DAZN Hollywood, FL: Warren vs. Richman ==
BKFC on DAZN Hollywood, FL: Warren vs. Richman
- Promotion: Bare Knuckle Fighting Championship
- Date: December 21, 2024
- Venue: Seminole Hard Rock Hotel & Casino Hollywood
- City: (United States) Hollywood, Florida

BKFC on DAZN Hollywood, FL: Warren vs. Richman (also known as BKFC on DAZN 3) is a bare-knuckle fighting event held by Bare Knuckle Fighting Championship on December 21, 2024.

=== Background ===
A BKFC Light Heavyweight Championship bout between current champion Jared Warren and former interim champion Mike Richman headlined the event. Also, a BKFC Women's Flyweight Championship bout between current champion Christine Ferea and Christine Vicens was the co-main event. Former Bellator Middleweight Champion Rafael Carvalho was scheduled to make his BKFC debut against Gilberto Fuentes. However, the bout was postponed after Carvalho signed with Global Fight League.

==== Bonus awards ====
The following fighters were awarded bonuses:

- Fight of the Night: Christine Ferea vs. Christine Vicens
- Knockout of the Night: Mike Richman
- Performance of the Night: Leonardo Perdomo, Bryan Duran, and Justin Ibarrola

=== Results ===
BKFC on DAZN Hollywood, FL: Warren vs. Richman
| Weight Class | | | | Method | Round | Time | Notes |
|---|---|---|---|---|---|---|---|
| Light Heavyweight 84 kg | (United States) Mike Richman | def. | (United States) Jared Warren (c) | KO (punch) | 1 | 0:44 | For the BKFC Light Heavyweight Championship. |
| W.Flyweight 57 kg | (United States) Christine Ferea (c) | def. | (United States) Christine Vicens | TKO (doctor stoppage) | 4 | 1:22 | For the BKFC Women's Flyweight Championship. |
| Heavyweight 120 kg | (Cuba) Leonardo Perdomo | def. | (United States) Levi Costa | KO (punches) | 1 | 0:47 | |
| Featherweight 66 kg | (Cuba) Bryan Duran | def. | (United States) Kasim Ruffin | KO (punches) | 1 | 1:59 | |
| Flyweight 57 kg | (United States) Gee Perez | def. | (United States) Cary Caprio | TKO (punches) | 1 | 0:24 | |
| Bantamweight 61 kg | (United States) Justin Ibarrola | def. | (United States) Derek Perez | TKO (punches) | 2 | 1:04 | |
| Featherweight 66 kg | (Nicaragua) Edgard Plazaola | def. | (Guam) Alex Castro | KO (punches) | 4 | 1:25 | |
| Middleweight 79 kg | (United States) Sabah Homasi | def. | (Mexico) Eduardo Peralta | KO (punch) | 2 | 1:02 | |
| Flyweight 57 kg | (United States) Tyler Randall | def. | (United States) Austin Lewis | KO (punches) | 1 | 1:46 | |
Preliminary Card
| Middleweight 79 kg | (United States) Francesco Ricchi | def. | (United States) Anthony Lacaze | Decision (unanimous) (50-43, 48-45, 50-43) | 5 | 2:00 | |
| Heavyweight 120 kg | (United States) Brock Walker | def. | (United States) Nicholas Blume | KO | 4 | 1:04 | |

== See also ==
- Bare Knuckle Fighting Championship
