= Keith Richardson (fighter) =

American mixed martial artist and bare-knuckle boxer (born 1983)

- Born: November 29, 1983 (age 42); Long Island, New York, U.S.
- Other names: The Rockstar
- Height: 5 ft 6 in (1.68 m)
- Weight: 138 lb (63 kg; 9.9 st)
- Division: Bantamweight; Featherweight; Lightweight
- Reach: 70 in (180 cm)
- Fighting out of: Rock Hill, South Carolina, U.S.
- Team: Modern Warrior MMA
- Years active: 2009–present

Mixed martial arts record
- Total: 33
- Wins: 22
- By knockout: 2
- By submission: 13
- By decision: 7
- Losses: 11
- By knockout: 5
- By submission: 5
- By decision: 1

Bare-knuckle boxing record
- Total: 8
- Wins: 6
- By knockout: 5
- Losses: 2
- By knockout: 2

Other information
- Mixed martial arts record from Sherdog

Keith Richardson (born November 29, 1983) is an American mixed martial artist and bare-knuckle boxer. He currently competes in the bantamweight division of Bare Knuckle Fighting Championship, where he is a former BKFC Bantamweight Champion. A professional mixed martial arts competitor since 2009, he has fought in Bellator, the Legacy Fighting Alliance, and King of the Cage.

As of April 13, 2026, he is #3 in the BKFC bantamweight rankings.

== Background ==
Richardson attended York Comprehensive High School in York, South Carolina. He was a wrestler in high school, winning the 2001 SCHSL 3A 125-pound state championship. He was also a state runner-up in the 2002 SCHSL 3A 130-pound weight class.

== Mixed martial arts career ==
Richardson started his professional MMA career in 2009. Throughout his career, he compiled a 22-11 professional record.

Richardson faced Matt Bessette at Bellator 153 on April 22, 2016. He lost in the second round due to a doctor stoppage.

Richardson faced Jon Queiroz at LFA 8 on April 7, 2017. He won the bout via split decision.

Richardson faced Tony Gravely at LFA 17 on July 21, 2017. He lost the bout via unanimous decision.

Richardson faced Solon Staley for the Fight Lab bantamweight title at Fight Lab 57 on December 2, 2017. He won the bout by split decision to win the title.

Richardson faced Daniel Straus on October 23, 2021 in the co-main event of XMMA 3. He won the bout by TKO via ground and pound.

In his most recent MMA bout, Richardson faced Hunter Azure on March 18, 2022, at iKON FC 2. He won the bout via rear-naked choke in the second round.

== Bare-knuckle boxing career ==
In his BKFC debut, Richardson faced Justin Scoggins at BKFC 35, which was held on January 27, 2023. He won the fight via unanimous decision.

Richardson made his sophomore appearance in the sport against Cody Jenkins at BKFC 42 on May 12, 2023. He won the fight via first-round knockout.

Richardson next faced Derek Perez in the co-main event of BKFC 48 on August 11, 2023. He won the fight via first-round technical knockout. This fight earned him the Knockout of the Night award.

Richardson faced defending champion Reggie Barnett Jr. for the BKFC Bantamweight Championship at BKFC 52 on October 20, 2023. He won the fight via second-round technical knockout to win the championship. This fight earned him the Performance of the Night award.

Richardson faced Alberto Blas on June 21, 2024 in the co-main event of BKFC 62. He lost the championship by TKO in Round 1.

Richardson faced Michael Larrimore in the main event on December 6, 2024 at BKFC 69. He won the fight by knockout 21 seconds into the first round.

Richardson faced Bekhzod Usmonov on February 28, 2025 in the main event at BKFC Fight Night 21. He lost the fight by knockout in the first round.

Richardson faced Joshua Oxendine on November 20, 2026 in the main event at BKFC Fight Night 49 and won by technical knockout at the end of the third round.

== Championships and accomplishments ==
=== Bare-knuckle boxing ===
- Bare Knuckle Fighting Championship
  - BKFC Bantamweight World Championship (One time)
  - Knockout of the Night (One time) vs. Derek Perez
  - Performance of the Night (One time) vs. Reggie Barnett Jr.
  - BKFC 2023 Debut of the Year

=== Mixed martial arts ===
- Fight Lab
  - Fight Lab Bantamweight Championship (One time)

== Mixed martial arts record ==
Professional record breakdown
33 matches	22 wins	11 losses
By knockout	2	5
By submission	13	5
By decision	7	1

Res.	Record	Opponent	Method	Event	Date	Round	Time	Location	Notes
Win	22–11	Hunter Azure	Submission (rear-naked choke)	iKON FC 2	March 18, 2022	2	2:05	Miami, Florida, United States	
Win	21–11	Jesse Bazzi	Submission (reverse triangle choke)	GLFC 20	February 19, 2022	1	4:27	Rock Hill, South Carolina, United States	
Win	20–11	Daniel Straus	TKO (punches)	XMMA 3: Vice City	October 23, 2021	2	1:54	Miami, Florida, United States	
Win	19–11	Meshack Adams	Submission (rear-naked choke)	Fight Lab 61	August 24, 2019	3	3:29	Charlotte, North Carolina, United States	
Loss	18–11	Patchy Mix	Submission (kneebar)	KOTC: In the Mix	November 10, 2018	3	3:29	Salamanca, New York, United States	
Loss	18–10	Andrew Whitney	KO	864 Championship 1	January 27, 2018	1	4:03	Spartanburg, South Carolina, United States	
Win	18–9	Solon Staley	Decision (split)	Fight Lab 57	December 2, 2017	3	5:00	Charlotte, North Carolina, United States	For the Fight Lab Bantamweight Championship.
Win	17–9	Da'Mon Blackshear	Decision (split)	Warfare 16	August 19, 2017	3	5:00	Myrtle Beach, South Carolina, United States	
Loss	16–9	Tony Gravely	Decision (unanimous)	LFA 17	July 21, 2017	3	5:00	Charlotte, North Carolina, United States	Catchweight (140 lb) bout.
Win	16–8	Jon Queiroz	Decision (split)	LFA 8	April 7, 2017	3	5:00	Greenville, South Carolina, United States	Featherweight bout.
Win	15–8	Jason Faglier Jr.	Submission (rear-naked choke)	Fight Lab 54	January 28, 2017	1	4:54	Charlotte, North Carolina, United States	
Loss	14–8	Dominic Mazzotta	Submission (guillotine choke)	Pinnacle FC 14	September 2, 2016	2	2:23	Cheswick, Pennsylvania, United States	For the Pinnacle FC Bantamweight Championship.
Loss	14–7	Matt Bessette	TKO (doctor stoppage)	Bellator 153	April 22, 2016	2	3:14	Uncasville, Connecticut, United States	
Win	14–6	Frank Caraballo	Submission (rear-naked choke)	Big Guns 16: The Summit	August 22, 2015	1	4:02	Tallmadge, Ohio, United States	Featherweight bout.
Win	13–6	Andrew Whitney	Submission (rear-naked choke)	Fight Lab 45	March 28, 2015	2	2:05	Charlotte, North Carolina, United States	Bantamweight bout.
Win	12–6	Rodrigo Lima	Submission (arm-triangle choke)	Fight Lab 43	January 24, 2015	3	2:46	Charlotte, North Carolina, United States	
Win	11–6	Rusty Crowder	Decision (unanimous)	Fight Lab 42	November 15, 2014	3	5:00	Charlotte, North Carolina, United States	Featherweight bout.
Win	10–6	Eric Calderon	Submission (armbar)	Fight Lab 38	July 26, 2014	1	4:09	Charlotte, North Carolina, United States	
Loss	9–6	Charles Rosa	TKO (punches)	Fight Lab 35	February 8, 2014	2	2:08	Charlotte, North Carolina, United States	Lightweight bout.
Loss	9–5	Nate Landwehr	KO (punch)	XFC 26: Night of Champions 3	October 18, 2013	1	4:43	Nashville, Tennessee, United States	
Win	9–4	Chino Duran	KO (punch)	Fight Lab 32	July 27, 2013	1	0:59	Charlotte, North Carolina, United States	
Win	8–4	Noe Quintanilla	Submission (rear-naked choke)	Fight Lab 31	May 4, 2013	2	1:38	Charlotte, North Carolina, United States	
Loss	7–4	Jarrod Card	Submission (guillotine choke)	XFC 21	December 7, 2012	2	0:24	Nashville, Tennessee, United States	
Win	7–3	Lawson McClure	Submission (rear-naked choke)	XFC 19: Charlotte Showdown	August 3, 2012	1	3:40	Charlotte, North Carolina, United States	
Win	6–3	D'Juan Owens	Decision (unanimous)	Fight Lab 23	April 19, 2012	3	5:00	Charlotte, North Carolina, United States	Featherweight bout.
Loss	5–3	Ronnie Rogers	Submission (guillotine choke)	Wild Bill's Fight Night 44	March 9, 2012	1	4:08	Duluth, Georgia, United States	Lightweight bout.
Win	5–2	Dustin Walden	Submission (rear-naked choke)	Imperial Fighting: Patriot Fights	September 10, 2011	2	1:55	Charlotte, North Carolina, United States	
Win	4–2	Robert Owens	Submission (keylock)	Fight Lab 16	August 6, 2011	2	0:39	Charlotte, North Carolina, United States	Featherweight debut.
Win	3–2	Marc Corum	Decision (unanimous)	Fight Lab 14: Misery Loves Company Series	April 16, 2011	3	5:00	Charlotte, North Carolina, United States	
Loss	2–2	Frank Millsap	KO (punch)	CFP: SunFest Fight Series Fight 1	June 5, 2010	2	0:58	Myrtle Beach, South Carolina, United States	
Win	2–1	Aaron Hall	Decision (unanimous)	Klash of the Kings II	April 3, 2010	3	5:00	Atlanta, Georgia, United States	
Loss	1–1	Joseph Carroll	Submission (armbar)	Misery Loves Company II	June 27, 2009	1	3:56	Charlotte, North Carolina, United States	
Win	1–0	Dustin Bedford	Submission (rear-naked choke)	UMMAXX Seven Out of the Cage	May 2, 2009	1	1:34	Akron, Ohio, United States	Lightweight debut.

== Bare knuckle record ==
Professional record breakdown
8 matches	6 wins	2 losses
By knockout	5	2
By decision	1	0

Res.	Record	Opponent	Method	Event	Date	Round	Time	Location	Notes
Win	6–2	Joshua Oxendine	TKO (punches)	BKFC Fight Night Myrtle Beach: Richardson vs. Oxendine	November 20, 2026	3	2:00	Myrtle Beach, South Carolina, United States	
Loss	5–2	Bekhzod Usmonov	KO (punches)	BKFC Fight Night Albuquerque: Richardson vs. Usmanov	February 28, 2025	1	0:55	Albuquerque, New Mexico, United States	
Win	5–1	Michael Larrimore	KO (punch)	BKFC 69	December 6, 2024	1	0:21	Duluth, Georgia, United States	
Loss	4–1	Alberto Blas	TKO (punches)	BKFC 62	June 21, 2024	1	1:10	Hollywood, Florida, United States	Lost the BKFC Bantamweight Championship.
Win	4–0	Reggie Barnett Jr.	TKO (punches)	BKFC 52	October 20, 2023	2	0:58	Columbia, South Carolina, United States	Won the BKFC Bantamweight Championship. Performance of the Night.
Win	3–0	Derek Perez	TKO (punches)	BKFC 48	August 11, 2023	1	0:37	Albuquerque, New Mexico, United States	Knockout of the Night.
Win	2–0	Cody Jenkins	KO (punches)	BKFC 42	May 12, 2023	1	1:41	Greenville, South Carolina, United States	
Win	1–0	Justin Scoggins	Decision (unanimous)	BKFC 35	January 27, 2023	5	2:00	Myrtle Beach, South Carolina, United States	
