= Stanoy Tabakov =

Bulgarian martial artist

- Born: Bulgaria
- Height: 6 ft 0 in (183 cm)
- Weight: 205 lb (93 kg; 14 st 9 lb)
- Division: Heavyweight (2010–2014)
- Reach: 76 in (193 cm)
- Style: Sambo
- Fighting out of: Bulgaria

Mixed martial arts record
- Total: 7
- Wins: 5
- By knockout: 2
- By submission: 2
- By decision: 1
- Losses: 2
- By knockout: 2

Other information
- Mixed martial arts record from Sherdog

Stanoy Tabakov (Bulgarian: Станой Табаков) is a Bulgarian bare-knuckle boxer, currently competing in the cruiserweight division in the Bare Knuckle Fighting Championship (BKFC). He was formerly a combat sambo competitor and mixed martial artist in the heavyweight division.

== Background ==
During his time as a combat sambo competitor, he became a bronze medalist at the 2010 European Sambo Championships in Minsk, Belarus.

During the 2010 World Sambo Championships, held in Tashkent, Uzbekistan between November 4–8, Tabakov became a silver medalist in the +100 kg category. He was defeated only by Russian combat sambo competitor "Baby Fedor" Kiril Sidelnikov.

== Mixed martial arts career ==
In his MMA debut at "RPC - Domination" on April 10, 2010, Tabakov lost by knockout in the first round.

On December 18, 2010, at Maxfight Warriors XVIII, Tabakov was defeated by Nedyalko Karadzhov in the first round by technical knockout as a result of punches.

After losing his first two bouts, he was able to win the next five fights including main eventing "Arena MMA Plovdiv - Fight Night 3" on September 20, 2014, against Hristo Yordanov where he won his final MMA fight by an armbar submission.

== Bare-knuckle boxing ==
=== Bare Knuckle Fighting Championship ===
Tabakov made his Bare Knuckle Fighting Championship debut at BKFC 58 against Petr Beranek on March 22, 2024, and won by knockout in the first round.

Tabakov headlined BKFC Fight Night Prospects: Newcastle in a cruiserweight main event against Paul Venis on June 8, 2024. He lost by way of technical knockout in the third round.

Tabakov faced Dawid Oscar on March 29, 2025 at BKFC Fight Night 23 and lost by technical knockout in the second round.

== Personal life ==
Tabakov has a son and daughter.

== Mixed martial arts record ==
Professional record breakdown
7 matches	5 wins	2 losses
By knockout	2	2
By submission	2	0
By decision	1	0

Res.	Record	Opponent	Method	Event	Date	Round	Time	Location	Notes
Win	5–2	Hristo Yordanov	Submission (armbar)	Arena MMA Plovdiv - Fight Night 3	September 20, 2014	2	1:52	Plovdiv, Bulgaria	
Win	4–2	Mario Dakis	KO (punch)	CL - Combat League	July 28, 2014	2	4:17	Xanthi, Greece	
Win	3–2	Zoran Vitanov	Decision (unanimous)	Arena MMA Plovdiv - Fight Night 1	May 7, 2014	3	5:00	Plovdiv, Bulgaria	
Win	2–2	Angel Karashev	KO (punch)	Twins MMA 1	June 8, 2013	1	2:53	Sofia, Bulgaria	
Win	1–2	Encho Angelov	Submission (keylock)	DOTC - Day of the Champions	December 27, 2012	2	3:00	Stara Zagora, Bulgaria	
Loss	0–2	Nedyalko Karadjov	TKO (punches)	Maxfight - Warriors 18	December 17, 2010	1	4:01	Sofia, Bulgaria	
Loss	0–1	Kamen Georgiev	TKO (punches)	RPC - Domination	April 10, 2010	1	0:00	Sofia, Bulgaria	

== Bare-knuckle boxing record ==
Professional record breakdown
3 matches	1 win	2 losses
By knockout	1	2

Res.	Record	Opponent	Method	Event	Date	Round	Time	Location	Notes
Loss	1–2	Dawid Oscar	TKO	BKFC Fight Night Manchester: Chipchase vs. Fox	March 29, 2025	2	0:26	Altrincham, England	
Loss	1–1	Paul Venis	TKO	BKFC Fight Night Prospects: Newcastle	June 8, 2024	3	0:47	Newcastle upon Tyne, England	
Win	1–0	Petr Beranek	KO	BKFC 58	March 22, 2024	1	1:24	Sofia, Bulgaria	
