= Takaya Ogura =

Japanese male kickboxer and boxer

- Born: 26 May 1994 (age 32); Kuki, Saitama, Japan
- Native name: 小倉 尚也
- Nationality: Japanese
- Height: 165 cm (5 ft 5 in)
- Weight: 55 kg (121 lb; 8 st 9 lb)
- Style: Kickboxing
- Stance: Orthodox
- Fighting out of: Shibuya, Tokyo, Japan
- Team: SCRAMBLE! Shibuya Gym

Kickboxing record
- Total: 32
- Wins: 18
- By knockout: 9
- Losses: 12
- By knockout: 3
- Draws: 2

Takaya Ogura (小倉 尚也, born 26 May 1994) is a Japanese kickboxer, currently competing in the super bantamweight division of K-1.

In August 2021, Combat Press ranked him as the #9 flyweight kickboxer in the world.

== Kickboxing career ==
=== K-1 ===
==== Early career ====
Ogura was scheduled to face Shuhei Kumura at Krush 89 on June 30, 2018. He lost the fight by majority decision.

Ogura was scheduled to face Ryota at K-1 World GP 2018: inaugural Cruiserweight Championship Tournament on September 24, 2018. He won the fight by a first-round knockout.

Ogura was scheduled to face Shuto Sato at REBELS 59 on December 5, 2018. He won the fight by a first-round knockout.

Ogura was scheduled to face Shoya Matsumoto at K-1 KRUSH FIGHT 99 on March 30, 2019. He won the fight by a third-round knockout.

Ogura was scheduled to face Yuta Hayashi at K-1 World GP 2019: Super Bantamweight World Tournament on June 30, 2019. He lost the fight by a first-round knockout.

Ogura was scheduled to face Ryuto at K-1 KRUSH FIGHT 106 on October 13, 2019. He lost the fight by split decision, after an extra round was fought.

Ogura was scheduled to face Lyra at Krush 117 on September 26, 2020. He won the fight by a second-round technical knockout.

Ogura was scheduled to face Yuto Kuroda at Krush 121 on January 23, 2021. He won the fight by unanimous decision, with scores of 30–28, 30–28 and 30–27.

Ogura was scheduled to face Kaito Komaki at Krush 125 on May 30, 2021. He won the fight by unanimous decision.

==== Krush Super Bantamweight tournament ====
Ogura participated in the 2021 Krush Super Bantamweight tournament, held to crown the new champion. He was scheduled to face Sho Uchida in the tournament quarterfinals, held at Krush 128 on August 21, 2021. Despite coming into the bout as a favorite, he lost the fight by unanimous decision, with scores of 29–28, 29–28 and 29–27. Ogura suffered the only knockdown of the fight in the second round.

==== Continued super bantamweight career ====
Ogura was booked to face the former Krush bantamweight champion Koki at Krush 135 on March 26, 2022. He lost the fight by majority decision, with scores of 28–27, 28–28 and 28–27.

Ogura faced Chikara Iwao, who returned to competition following a seven-year absence from the sport, at Krush 140 on August 27, 2022. He lost the fight by a first-round knockout.

Ogura faced Kazuya Sato at KNOCK OUT 2022 vol.8 on December 11, 2022. He won the fight by unanimous decision.

Ogura faced Reo Kudo at KNOCK OUT 2023 SUPER BOUT BLAZE on March 5, 2023. He won the fight by a first-round knockout.

== Fight record ==
Professional Kickboxing Record
18 Wins (9 (T)KO's), 13 Losses, 2 Draw, 0 No Contest
Date	Result	Opponent	Event	Location	Method	Round	Time
2023-08-06	Loss	(Japan) Seiya Furuki	KNOCK OUT 2023 vol.3	Tokyo, Japan	TKO (3 Knockdowns/punches)	1	2:35
For the KNOCK OUT Black -55kg title.
2023-06-11	Loss	(Japan) Musashi	KNOCK OUT 2023 vol.2	Tokyo, Japan	TKO (3 Knockdowns/punches)	1	1:55
2023-03-05	Win	(Japan) Reo Kudo	KNOCK OUT 2023 SUPER BOUT BLAZE	Tokyo, Japan	KO (Punches)	1	3:00
2022-12-11	Win	(Japan) Kazuya Sato	KNOCK OUT 2022 vol.8	Tokyo, Japan	Decision (Unanimous)	3	3:00
2022-08-27	Loss	(Japan) Chikara Iwao	Krush 140	Tokyo, Japan	KO (Body punches)	1	2:03
2022-03-26	Loss	(Japan) Koki	Krush 135	Tokyo, Japan	Decision (Majority)	3	3:00
2021-08-21	Loss	(Japan) Sho Uchida	Krush 128, Tournament Quarterfinal	Tokyo, Japan	Decision (Unanimous)	3	3:00
2021-05-30	Win	(Japan) Kaito Komaki	Krush 125	Tokyo, Japan	Decision (Unanimous)	3	3:00
2021-01-23	Win	(Japan) Yuto Kuroda	Krush 121	Tokyo, Japan	Decision (Unanimous)	3	3:00
2020-09-26	Win	(Japan) Lyra	Krush 117	Tokyo, Japan	TKO (Three knockdowns)	2	2:56
2019-10-13	Loss	(Japan) Ryuto	K-1 KRUSH FIGHT 106	Tokyo, Japan	Ext. R. Decision (Split)	4	3:00
2019-06-30	Loss	(Japan) Yuta Hayashi	K-1 World GP 2019: Super Bantamweight World Tournament	Tokyo, Japan	TKO (Punches)	1	1:44
2019-03-30	Win	(Japan) Shoya Matsumoto	K-1 KRUSH FIGHT 99	Tokyo, Japan	KO (Right straight)	3	1:15
2018-12-05	Win	(Japan) Shuto Sato	REBELS 59	Tokyo, Japan	KO (Right hook)	2	1:57
2018-09-24	Win	(Japan) Ryota	K-1 World GP 2018: inaugural Cruiserweight Championship Tournament	Tokyo, Japan	KO (Right straight)	1	0:38
2018-06-30	Loss	(Japan) Shuhei Kumura	Krush 89	Tokyo, Japan	Decision (Majority)	3	3:00
2018-04-22	Win	(Japan) Kazuki Okawa	Krush 87	Tokyo, Japan	TKO (Punches and knees)	2	0:50
2017-10-01	Loss	(Japan) Riku Morisaka	Krush 81	Tokyo, Japan	Decision (Majority)	3	3:00
2017-07-08	Loss	(Japan) Shota Oiwa	KHAOS 3	Tokyo, Japan	Decision (Majority)	3	3:00
2017-04-16	Win	(Japan) Junichi Matsumoto	REBELS.50	Tokyo, Japan	KO	2	0:45
2017-03-11	Win	(Japan) Shinya Hanzawa	REBELS.49	Tokyo, Japan	Decision (Unanimous)	3	3:00
2016-11-30	Win	(Japan) Masafumi Nakai	REBELS.47	Tokyo, Japan	Decision (Majority)	3	3:00
2016-10-16	Draw	(Japan) Riku Morisaka	Shuken 32	Tokyo, Japan	Decision	3	3:00
2016-06-01	Loss	(Japan) Masaji Tozuka	REBELS.43	Tokyo, Japan	Decision (Majority)	3	3:00
2016-03-09	Loss	(Japan) Yudai Suzuki	REBELS.41	Tokyo, Japan	Decision (Unanimous)	3	3:00
2016-01-24	Win	(Japan) Suksonleo StudioGym	REBELS.40	Tokyo, Japan	Decision (Unanimous)	3	3:00
2015-11-15	Win	(Japan) Hokuto	Bigbang the future 15	Tokyo, Japan	Decision	3	3:00
2015-07-12	Draw	(Japan) Takuya Oyama	REBELS.37	Tokyo, Japan	Decision (Majority)	3	3:00
2015-05-10	Win	(Japan) Harashima Mormot Yuji	REBELS.36	Tokyo, Japan	Decision (Majority)	3	3:00
2014-12-23	Win	(Japan) Masachika Morimoto	REBELS.32	Tokyo, Japan	KO	2	2:32
2014-09-21	Loss	(Japan) Taio Asahisa	J-FIGHT in Shinjuku vol.39 - Next Generation Cup, Semi Final	Tokyo, Japan	TKO	2	0:09
2014-09-21	Win	(Japan) Atsushi Nojou	J-FIGHT in Shinjuku vol.39 - Next Generation Cup, Quarter Final	Tokyo, Japan	Ext.R Decision (Unanimous)	3	3:00
Legend: Win Loss Draw/No contest Notes

== See also ==
- List of male kickboxers
