= Riku Morisaka =

Japanese kickboxer (born 1998)

- Born: 森坂 陸 April 15, 1998 (age 28); Yokohama, Japan
- Other names: Blue Butterfly
- Nationality: Japanese
- Height: 166 cm (5 ft 5 in)
- Weight: 57.5 kg (127 lb; 9.05 st)
- Division: Super Flyweight
- Style: Kickboxing
- Stance: Orthodox
- Fighting out of: Tokyo, Japan
- Team: Ace Gym
- Years active: 2015 - 2023

Kickboxing record
- Total: 34
- Wins: 17
- By knockout: 3
- Losses: 15
- By knockout: 1
- Draws: 2
- No contests: 0

Riku Morisaka (Japanese: 森坂 陸, Morisaka Riku; born April 15, 1998) is a retired Japanese kickboxer, who fought out of Tokyo, Japan. He is a former Krush Featherweight (-57.5kg) champion.

Beyond Kick ranked him as the ninth best -58 kg kickboxer in the world between April and July 2023.

== Kickboxing career ==
=== Super bantamweight ===
Morisaka made his professional debut against Takumi at Syuken 27 on October 25, 2015. He won the fight by unanimous decision and amassed a 4–3–1 record over the next two years, before being placed in the KHAOS super bantamweight tournament, which was scheduled to take place at KHAOS 2 on July 8, 2017. Although Morisaka was able to overcome the future Krush and K-1 featherweight champion Yuki Egawa by split decision in the semifinals of the one-day tournament, he lost the final bout against Shota Oiwa by unanimous decision. It was his second career loss at the hands of Oiwa, as he had previously beaten him by unanimous decision at Syuken 30 on February 11, 2016.

On May 26, 2018, Morisaka faced another future K-1 featherweight champion in Tatsuya Tsubakihara at KHAOS 5. He lost the fight by unanimous decision. Four months later, at Krush 93 on September 30, 2018, Morisaka was booked to face Taito Gunji in the quarterfinals of the Krush Super Bantamweight tournament. He lost the fight by majority decision, with two of the judges scoring the fight 30-28 for Gunji, while the third judge scored it 30-30.

=== Featherweight ===
==== Move up in weight ====
Morisaka took part in the one-day Krush featherweight tournament, held to fill the vacant throne, at Krush 119 on November 27, 2019. He faced Keito Okajima in the semifinals and won the fight by a third-round technical knockout, knocking Okajima down twice by the 2:58 minute mark of the round. In the tournament final Morisaka faced Takahito Niimi. The fight was ruled a draw after the first three rounds were fought, with two of the judges scoring the bout as a draw (29-29 and 30-30), while the third judge scored it 30–29 in Niimi's favor. Accordingly, an extension rounds was fought, after which Niimi won a unanimous decision.

Morisaka was scheduled to rematch Taito Gunji at K-1: K'Festa 4 Day 1 on March 21, 2021. He lost the fight by unanimous decision, with scores of 30–27, 30-26 and 30–26.

Morisaka faced Toma Tanabe at K-1 World GP 2021 in Osaka on December 4, 2021. He lost the fight by unanimous decision.

Morisaka faced Haruma Saikyo at K-1 World GP 2022 Yokohamatsuri on September 11, 2022, in what was Saikyo's return to professional competition following a close to three-year absence from the sport. He won the fight by split decision, after an extra fourth round was contested.

Morisaka faced the once-defeated Rei Inagaki at Krush 144 on December 18, 2022. He won the fight by unanimous decision, with all three judges awarding him a 30–29 scorecard.

==== Krush champion ====
Morisaka challenged Shuhei Kumura for his Krush Featherweight (-57.5kg) title at Krush 147 on March 25, 2023. He won the fight by unanimous decision, with two scorecards of 30–28 and one scorecard of 29–28. Morisaka knocked his opponent down with a spinning backfist in the opening round of the contest.

Morisaka faced the former K-1 featherweight champion Tatsuya Tsubakihara at K-1 World GP 2023 in Yokohama on June 3, 2023. He lost the fight by unanimous decision, with two scorecards of 30–28 and one scorecard of 30–29.

Morisaka made his first Krush Featherweight title defense against Tatsuki Shinotsuka at Krush 154 on October 21, 2023. He lost the fight by majority decision, with scores of 30–29, 30–29 and 29–29.

He announced his retirement from the sport of kickboxing on October 28, 2023.

== Titles and accomplishments ==
- KHAOS
  - 2017 KHAOS Super Bantamweight Tournament Runner-up
- Krush
  - 2020 Krush Featherweight (-57.5 kg) Tournament Runner-up
  - 2023 Krush Featherweight (-57.5kg) Champion
  - 2023 Fight of the Year (vs. Tatsuki Shinotsuka)

== Fight record ==
Kickboxing record
17 Wins (3 (T)KOs), 15 Losses, 2 Draws
Date	Result	Opponent	Event	Location	Method	Round	Time
2024-06-23	Loss	(Japan) Haruto Matsumoto	Krush 162	Tokyo, Japan	TKO (Doctor stoppage)	2	3:00
2023-10-21	Loss	(Japan) Tatsuki Shinotsuka	Krush 154	Tokyo, Japan	Decision (Majority)	3	3:00
Loses the Krush Featherweight (-57.5kg) title.
2023-06-03	Loss	(Japan) Tatsuya Tsubakihara	K-1 World GP 2023: inaugural Middleweight Championship Tournament	Yokohama, Japan	Decision (Unanimous)	3	3:00
2023-03-25	Win	(Japan) Shuhei Kumura	Krush 147	Tokyo, Japan	Decision (Unanimous)	3	3:00
Wins the Krush Featherweight (-57.5kg) title.
2022-12-18	Win	(Japan) Rei Inagaki	Krush 144	Tokyo, Japan	Decision (Unanimous)	3	3:00
2022-09-11	Win	(Japan) Haruma Saikyo	K-1 World GP 2022 Yokohamatsuri	Yokohama, Japan	Ext.R Decision (Split)	4	3:00
2022-07-30	Win	(Japan) Yusho Kanemoto	Krush 139	Tokyo, Japan	Decision (Unanimous)	3	3:00
2022-04-30	Win	(Japan) Masaki Takeuchi	Krush 136	Tokyo, Japan	Decision (Majority)	3	3:00
2021-12-04	Loss	(Japan) Toma	K-1 World GP 2021 in Osaka	Osaka, Japan	Decision (Unanimous)	3	3:00
2021-03-21	Loss	(Japan) Taito Gunji	K-1: K'Festa 4 Day 1	Tokyo, Japan	Decision (Unanimous)	3	3:00
2020-11-27	Loss	(Japan) Takahito Niimi	Krush 119, Featherweight Championship Tournament Final	Tokyo, Japan	Ext.R Decision (Unanimous)	4	3:00
For the Krush Featherweight (-57.5kg) title.
2020-11-27	Win	(Japan) Keito Okajima	Krush 119, Featherweight Championship Tournament Semi-Final	Tokyo, Japan	TKO (2 Knockdowns/backfist)	3	2:58
2020-09-26	Win	(Japan) Rikiya Yamaura	Krush 117	Tokyo, Japan	Decision (Unanimous)	3	3:00
2020-07-11	Win	(Japan) Masaki	Krush 114	Tokyo, Japan	Decision (Unanimous)	3	3:00
2019-11-08	Loss	(Japan) Takahiro	Krush 107	Tokyo, Japan	Decision (Majority)	3	3:00
2019-08-31	Loss	(Japan) Tenma Sano	Krush 104	Tokyo, Japan	Decision (Unanimous)	3	3:00
2019-06-21	Draw	(Japan) Naoki Takahashi	Krush 102	Tokyo, Japan	Decision (Majority)	3	3:00
2019-05-18	Win	(Japan) Masafumi Kurasaki	Krush 101	Tokyo, Japan	Decision (Majority)	3	3:00
2019-03-10	Win	(Japan) Yuto Kuroda	K-1 World GP 2019: K’FESTA 2	Saitama, Japan	Decision (Unanimous)	3	3:00
2018-12-16	Win	(Japan) Shoya Masumoto	Krush 96	Tokyo, Japan	Decision (Unanimous)	3	3:00
2018-09-30	Loss	(Japan) Taito Gunji	Krush.93, Tournament Quarterfinals	Tokyo, Japan	Decision (Majority)	3	3:00
2018-05-26	Loss	(Japan) Tatsuya Tsubakihara	KHAOS.5	Tokyo, Japan	Decision (Unanimous)	3	3:00
2018-01-27	Loss	(Japan) Yusho Kanemoto	Krush 84	Tokyo, Japan	Decision (Unanimous)	3	3:00
2017-10-01	Win	(Japan) Takaya Ogura	Krush 81	Tokyo, Japan	Decision (Majority)	3	3:00
2017-07-08	Loss	(Japan) Shota Oiwa	KHAOS.3, Final	Tokyo, Japan	Ext.R Decision (Unanimous)	4	3:00
2017-07-08	Win	(Japan) Yuki Egawa	KHAOS.3, Semi-Final	Tokyo, Japan	Ext.R Decision (Split)	4	3:00
2017-05-13	Loss	(Japan) Reito Bravely	KHAOS.2	Tokyo, Japan	Decision (Unanimous)	3	3:00
2017-01-29	Win	(Japan) Hokuto	Syuken 34	Tokyo, Japan	KO (Left hook to the body)	3	1:35
2016-10-16	Draw	(Japan) Takaya Ogura	Syuken 32	Tokyo, Japan	Decision	3	3:00
2016-07-03	Loss	(Japan) Kodia Kusaka	NJKF DUEL 7	Tokyo, Japan	Decision (Unanimous)	3	3:00
2016-05-01	Win	(Japan) Ryo “440” Ida	Syuken 31	Tokyo, Japan	KO (Spinning back fist)	3	1:36
2016-02-11	Loss	(Japan) Shota Oiwa	Syuken 30	Tokyo, Japan	Decision (Unanimous)	3	3:00
2015-12-06	Win	(Japan) Kenshin Uesugi	Syuken 28	Tokyo, Japan	Decision (Unanimous)	3	3:00
2015-10-25	Win	(Japan) Takumi	Syuken 27	Tokyo, Japan	Decision (Unanimous)	3	3:00
Legend: Win Loss Draw/No contest Notes

Amateur Kickboxing Record
Date	Result	Opponent	Event	Location	Method	Round	Time
2015-04-12	Win	(Japan) Tadahiro Hayashi	Shin Kakutougi	Tokyo, Japan	Decision (split)		
2015-01-31	Win	(Japan) Kouki Nonuoi	Syuken Amateur 24	Tokyo, Japan	Decision (unanimous)		
2014-11-30	Draw	(Japan) Masayasu	Syuken Amateur	Tokyo, Japan	Decision (split)		
2014-09-28	Win	(Japan) Tetsuji Otsu	Syuken Amateur 20	Tokyo, Japan	Decision (unanimous)		
2014-05-25	Win	(Japan) Seigo Matsunaga	Syuken Amateur	Tokyo, Japan	Decision (majority)		
2014-02-23	Draw	(Japan) Teppei Yoshida	Syuken Amateur 16	Tokyo, Japan	Decision		
2014-02-23	Loss	(Japan) Naotaka	Syuken Amateur 16	Tokyo, Japan	Decision		
2013-11-24	Win	(Japan) Takuya Rajasaklek	All Japan Amateur Kick 3	Tokyo, Japan	Decision		
2013-09-29	Loss	(Japan) Tsubasa Okamoto	Syuken Amateur 16	Tokyo, Japan	Decision		
2013-07-28	Win	(Japan) Yuki Nagamine	Syuken Amateur 11	Tokyo, Japan	Decision (majority)		
Legend: Win Loss Draw/No contest Notes

== See also ==
- List of male kickboxers
