= Tatsuki Shinotsuka =

Japanese male kickboxer and boxer

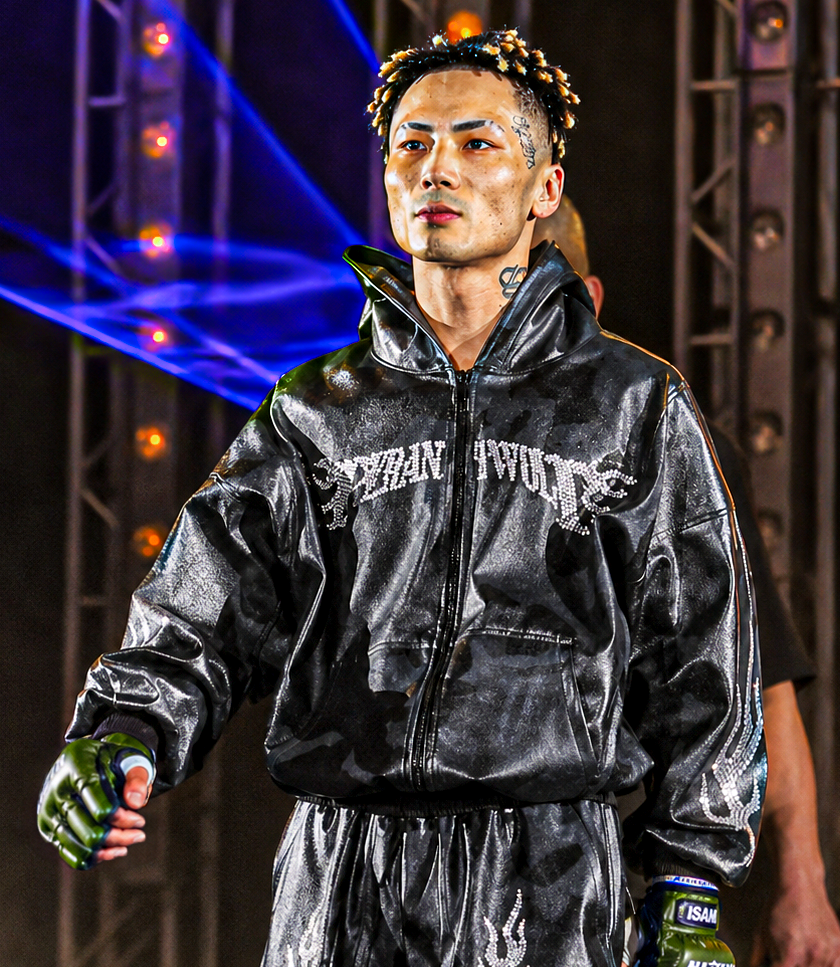
- Born: 7 May 1998 (age 28); Kamisu, Japan
- Native name: 篠塚辰樹
- Other names: Rude Bwoy
- Height: 173 cm (5 ft 8 in)
- Weight: 57.5 kg (127 lb; 9 st 1 lb)
- Division: Super Flyweight
- Style: Kickboxing
- Stance: Orthodox
- Team: Watanabe Gym (Boxing); Team Teppen (2018-2019); Target Shibuya (2020) Unaffiliated (2021-present)
- Years active: 2016-present

Professional boxing record
- Total: 4
- Wins: 3
- By knockout: 2
- Losses: 1
- By knockout: 0

Kickboxing record
- Total: 16
- Wins: 13
- By knockout: 9
- Losses: 3
- By knockout: 2

Other information
- Website: https://tatsuki57mbs.official.ec/
- Boxing record from BoxRec

Tatsuki Shinotsuka (篠塚辰樹, born 7 May 1998) is a Japanese kickboxer and former boxer, currently competing in the featherweight division of K-1. He is the former Krush Featherweight (-57.5kg) champion.

Combat Press ranked him as the #10 ranked Super Flyweight in the world between July and August 2021.

== Boxing career ==
Shinotsuka made his boxing debut against Izuki Tomioka on 14 December 2016. He lost the fight by unanimous decision.

Shinotsuka was scheduled to face Chanchai Khowaka on 28 March 2017. He won the fight by a first-round knockout.

Shinotsuka was scheduled to face Tasuku Suwa on 8 June 2017. He won the fight by unanimous decision, with scores of 58–55, 59–55, 59–54.

Shinotsuka was scheduled to make his last professional boxing appearance, before his transition to kickboxing, against Takehiro Shinohara on 12 October 2017. He won the fight by a first-round technical knockout.

== Kickboxing career ==
=== RISE ===
==== Early RISE career ====
Shinotsuka was scheduled to make his kickboxing debut against Kensei Yamakawa at RISE 122 on 4 February 2018. He entered the sport as a highly regarded prospect, owing to his boxing career and affiliation with the Teppen Gym. He won the fight by a first-round knockout, stopping Yamakawa with a left hook at the 1:16 minute mark.

Shinotsuka was scheduled to face the six-fight RISE veteran Masahide Kudo at RISE 123 on 24 March 2018. Kudo won the fight by a second-round technical knockout, managing to knock Shinotsuka down three times by the halfway point of the round. All knockdowns resulted from repeated low kicks to the lead leg.

==== Five-fight winning streak ====
Shinotsuka was scheduled to face Shinya Hanzawa at RISE 125 on 17 June 2018. He won the fight by a third-round knockout, stopping Hanzawa with a left hook with thirty seconds left in the bout.

Shinotsuka was scheduled to face Kenta Yagami at RISE 127 on 16 September 2018. He won the fight by a first-round technical knockout.

Shinotsuka was scheduled to fight Jin Lee at RISE 129 on 17 November 2018. He won the fight by a first-round technical knockout. Shinotsuka knocked Lee down with a combination of a right straight and left hook midway through the round. Although Lee was able to stand up in time for the eight-count, he was unsteady on his feet, forcing the referee to stop the fight.

Shinotsuka fought Ryuki Kaneda at RISE 130 on 3 February 2019. He won the fight by unanimous decision, with all three judges scoring the fight 29–28 in his favor.

Shinotsuka was scheduled to face Ruka at RISE World Series 2019: First Round on 10 March 2019. He won the fight by a first-round knockout, needing just 61 seconds to stop Ruka with a right straight.

==== Departure from Teppen Gym ====
For his last fight of 2019, Shinotsuka was scheduled to fight Yoshihisa Morimoto at RISE 132 on 19 May 2019. The closely contested bout was ruled a majority draw after the first three rounds were fought, with one judge awarding Shinotsuka a 30-29 scorecard, while the other two judges scored it as a 29–29 draw. Morimoto was awarded a split decision, after an extra round was fought. Following this loss, Shinotsuka left Teppen Gym and began training with Target Shibuya.

Shinotsuka made his sole appearance of 2020 against Ryoga Hirano at RISE 137 on 23 February 2020. He won the fight by a first-round knockout.

=== K-1 ===
On 1 January 2021, Shinotsuka announced his departure from Target Shibuya.

Shinotsuka was scheduled to make his promotional debut against Kaito Ozawa at K'Festa 4 Day 1 on 21 March 2021. The fight was ruled a majority draw after the first three rounds were fought, with two of the judges scoring the bout as 30-30, while the third judge scored the bout as 30–29 in Shinotsuka's favor. Shinotsuka was awarded a split decision after an extra round was fought. Shinotsuka revealed during the post-fight conference that he entered the fight with a broken right hand and an injured leg.

Shinotsuka was scheduled to face Toma Tanabe at K-1 World GP 2021: Yokohamatsuri on 20 September 2021. A month before the event, Shinotsuka withdrew from the bout, due to a hand and neck injury he sustained during training.

Shinotsuka was scheduled to challenge the reigning Krush Featherweight champion Takahito Niimi at Krush 132 on 18 December 2021. He lost the fight by a second-round knockout, after being knocked down a total of four times. The first knockdown came early in the opening round, while the remaining three happened in the third round.

Shinotsuka was expected to face Yusuke at Krush 141 on 24 September 2022. He withdrew from the fight on 9 September, due to a proximal phalanx bone fracture of a toe on his right foot.

Shinotsuka faced Yuta Hayashi at Krush 147 on 25 March 2023. He won the fight by a first-round knockout.

Shinotsuka faced Yusuke K-1 World GP 2023 at on 17 July 2023. He won the fight by stoppage in the extension round.

Shinotsuka challenged the Krush Featherweight (-57.5kg) champion Riku Morisaka at Krush 154 on 21 October 2023. He won the fight by majority decision, with scores of 30–29, 30–29 and 29–29.

=== Rizin ===
Shinotsuka faced Daichi Tomizawa at Rizin 45 on 31 December 2023. He won the bout via unanimous decision.

On 27 March 2024, Shinotsuka announced that he had bought out his contract with K-1.

Shinotsuka faced Aoi Noda at Rizin Bangaichi on December 31, 2024. He won the fight by a first-round technical knockout. Shinotsuka knocked his opponent down with a jab and finished the fight with a left hook soon thereafter.

== Mixed martial arts career ==
Shinotsuka made his mixed martial arts debut against Hiroya Kondo at Rizin: Otoko Matsuri on May 4, 2025. He lost the fight by a first-round technical knockout., He had his second mixed martial arts fight in a rematch against Daichi Tomizawa At Rizin: Shiwasu no Cho Tsuwamono Matsuri on December 31, 2025, He won the Rematch By a third-round knockout at the 3:22 mark. He was Scheduled for his next mixed martial arts bout At Rizin Landmark 15 in Hiroshima against Jae Hoon Lee, But he pulled out with an injury and was replaced with Kyohei “Hinotori” Takagi

== Bare-knuckle boxing ==
Shinotsuka faced Justyn Martinez at Rizin 46 on 29 April 2024, in a Bare Knuckle boxing bout, knocking his opponent out in the first round.

=== Bare Knuckle Fighting Championship ===
Shinotsuka was scheduled to face Cary Caprio on 12 July 2024, at BKFC Fight Night Pechanga. However, the bout was removed from the fight card one week before the event for unknown reasons.

== Titles and accomplishments ==
- Krush
  - 2023 Krush Featherweight (-57.5kg) Champion
  - 2023 Fight of the Year (vs. Riku Morisaka)

== Mixed martial arts record ==
Professional record breakdown
2 matches	1 win	1 loss
By knockout	1	1

Res.	Record	Opponent	Method	Event	Date	Round	Time	Location	Notes
Win	1–1	Daichi Tomizawa	KO (punches)	Rizin: Shiwasu no Cho Tsuwamono Matsuri	December 31, 2025	2	3:22	Saitama, Japan	
Loss	0–1	Hiroya Kondo	TKO (corner stoppage)	Rizin: Otoko Matsuri	May 4, 2025	1	2:11	Tokyo, Japan	Flyweight debut.

== Kickboxing record ==
Kickboxing record
13 Wins (9 (T)KO's), 3 Losses, 0 Draw, 0 No Contest
Date	Result	Opponent	Event	Location	Method	Round	Time
2024-12-31	Win	(Japan) Aoi Noda	Rizin Bangaichi	Saitama, Japan	TKO (3 Knockdowns)	1	2:03
2023-12-31	Win	(Japan) Daichi Tomizawa	Rizin 45	Saitama, Japan	Decision (Unanimous)	3	3:00
2023-10-21	Win	(Japan) Riku Morisaka	Krush 154	Tokyo, Japan	Decision (Majority)	3	3:00
Wins the Krush Featherweight (-57.5kg) title.
2023-07-17	Win	(Japan) Yusuke	K-1 World GP 2023	Tokyo, Japan	Ext.R KO (Punches)	4	0:46
2023-03-25	Win	(Japan) Yuta Hayashi	Krush 147	Tokyo, Japan	KO (Punches)	1	1:41
2021-12-18	Loss	(Japan) Takahito Niimi	Krush 132	Tokyo, Japan	KO (Punches + knee)	2	2:57
For the Krush Featherweight Championship.
2021-03-21	Win	(Japan) Kaito Ozawa	K'Festa 4 Day 1	Tokyo, Japan	Ext. R Decision (Split)	4	3:00
2020-02-23	Win	(Japan) Ryoga Hirano	RISE 137	Tokyo, Japan	KO (Right knee)	1	1:50
2019-05-19	Loss	(Japan) Yoshihisa Morimoto	RISE 132	Tokyo, Japan	Ext. R. Decision (Split)	4	3:00
2019-03-10	Win	(Japan) Ruka	RISE World Series 2019: First Round	Ota, Japan	KO (Right straight)	1	1:01
2019-02-03	Win	(Japan) Ryuki Kaneda	RISE 130	Tokyo, Japan	Decision (Unanimous)	3	3:00
2018-11-17	Win	(South Korea) Jin Lee	RISE 129	Tokyo, Japan	TKO (Punches)	1	1:34
2018-09-16	Win	(Japan) Kenta Yagami	RISE 127	Tokyo, Japan	TKO (Punches)	1	1:49
2018-06-17	Win	(Japan) Shinya Hanzawa	RISE 125	Chiba, Japan	KO (Left hook)	3	2:33
2018-03-24	Loss	(Japan) Masahide Kudo	RISE 123	Tokyo, Japan	TKO (Three knockdowns)	2	1:34
2018-02-04	Win	(Japan) Kensei Yamakawa	RISE 122	Tokyo, Japan	KO (Left hook)	1	1:16
Legend: Win Loss Draw/No contest Notes

== Professional boxing record ==
4 fights	3 wins	1 loss
By knockout	2	0
By decision	1	1

No.	Result	Record	Opponent	Type	Round, time	Date	Location	Notes
4	Win	3–1	(Japan) Takehiro Shinohara	TKO	1 (8), 1:09	12 October 2017	Korakuen Hall, Tokyo, Japan	
3	Win	2–1	(Japan) Tasuku Suwa	UD	6	8 June 2017	Korakuen Hall, Tokyo, Japan	
2	Win	1–1	(Thailand) Chanchai Khowaka	KO	1 (6), 3:09	28 March 2017	Korakuen Hall, Tokyo, Japan	
1	Loss	0–1	(Japan) Izuki Tomioka	UD	6	14 December 2016	Korakuen Hall, Tokyo, Japan	

== Bare knuckle boxing record ==
Professional record breakdown
1 match	1 win	0 losses
By knockout	1	0

Res.	Record	Opponent	Method	Event	Date	Round	Time	Location	Notes
Win	1–0	Justyn Martinez	KO (right straight)	Rizin 46	29 April 2024	1	1:53	Tokyo, Japan	

== See also ==
- List of male kickboxers
