= 2019 in Bare Knuckle Fighting Championship =

Information
- First date: February 2, 2019
- Last date: November 16, 2019

Events
- Total events: 6

Fights
- Total fights: 60
- Title fights: 7

Chronology
2018 in Bare Knuckle Fighting Championship	2019 in Bare Knuckle Fighting Championship	2020 in Bare Knuckle Fighting Championship

The year 2019 is the second year in the history of the Bare Knuckle Fighting Championship, a bare-knuckle fighting promotion based in Philadelphia. The season started with Bare Knuckle Fighting Championship 4: USA vs Mexico. BKFC is available on PPV all over the world and on FITE TV.

== Background ==
=== BKFC 2019 Awards ===
The following fighters won the Bare Knuckle Fighting Championship year-end awards for 2019:

- BKFC Fighter of the Year 2019: Johnny Bedford
- BKFC Fight of the Year 2019: Artem Lobov vs. Jason Knight 1 (BKFC 5)
- BKFC Knockout of the Year 2019: Kaleb Harris against Johnavan Vistante (BKFC 7)

=== Lightweight Championship Tournament Bracket ===
Quarter-Finals; BKFC 3
(United States) Reggie Barnett Jr	FF
(United States) Josue Rivera	-
(United States) Rusty Crowder	TKO
(United States) Joe Pegg	2R.
(United States) Shawn West	1R.
(Puerto Rico) Abdiel Velazquez	TKO
(United States) Matt Murphy	5R.
(United States) Johnny Bedford	UD

Semi-Finals; BKFC 5
(United States) Reggie Barnett Jr	UD
(United States) Rusty Crowder	5R.
(Puerto Rico) Abdiel Velazquez	4R.
(United States) Johnny Bedford	TKO

Final; BKFC 6
(United States) Reggie Barnett Jr	5R.
(United States) Johnny Bedford	UD

Josue Rivera never arrived at the event, allowing Reggie Barnett Jr to advance to the semifinals by Forfeit.

== List of events ==
#	Event	Date	Venue	Location
1	BKFC 4: USA vs. Mexico	February 2, 2019	Beto Ávila Stadium	Cancun, Mexico
2	BKFC 5: Lobov vs. Knight	April 6, 2019	Mississippi Coast Coliseum	(United States) Biloxi, Mississippi, USA
3	BKFC 6: Malignaggi vs. Lobov	June 22, 2019	Florida State Fairgrounds	(United States) Tampa, Florida, USA
4	BKFC 7: Alers vs. Garcia	August 10, 2019	Mississippi Coast Coliseum	(United States) Biloxi, Mississippi, USA
5	BKFC 8: Silva vs. Gonzaga	October 19, 2019	Florida State Fairgrounds	(United States) Tampa, Florida, USA
6	BKFC 9: Lobov vs. Knight II	November 16, 2019	Mississippi Coast Coliseum	(United States) Biloxi, Mississippi, USA

== BKFC 4: USA vs. Mexico ==
BKFC 4: USA vs Mexico
- Promotion: Bare Knuckle Fighting Championship
- Date: February 2, 2019
- Venue: Beto Ávila Stadium
- City: Cancun, Mexico

BKFC 4: USA vs. Mexico was a bare-knuckle fighting event held by Bare Knuckle Fighting Championship on February 2, 2019 at the Beto Ávila Stadium in Cancun, Mexico.

=== Background ===
This was the first international bare-knuckle boxing event by Bare Knuckle Fighting Championship (BKFC).

=== Results ===
BKFC 4: USA vs. Mexico
Weight Class				Method	Round	Time	Notes
Middleweight 75 kg	(United States) Leonard Garcia	def.	(United States) Julian Lane	TKO (punches)	2	1:31	
Women's Featherweight 57 kg	(Australia) Bec Rawlings (c)	def.	(Mexico) Cecilia Ulloa Flores	Decision (unanimous)	5	2:00	For the Police Gazette Women's Featherweight World Championship. 50-45, 48-47, 49-45.
Heavyweight 120 kg	(United States) Joey Beltran	vs.	(United States) Tony Lopez	Draw (split)	5	2:00	49-46, 48-47, 48-48
Super Middleweight 80 kg	(United States) Chris Lytle	def.	(Mexico) JC Llamas	Decision (unanimous)	5	2:00	49-46, 48-47, 49-46
Heavyweight 120 kg	(United States) Sam Shewmaker	def.	(Mexico) Jaime Arevalo	Decision (split)	5	2:00	49-48, 47-48, 49-46
Light Heavyweight 84 kg	(United States) Joe Riggs	def.	(Mexico) Heriberto Tovar	Decision (unanimous)	5	2:00	49-45, 50-46, 50-44
Middleweight 75 kg	(United States) Tom Shoaff	def.	(Mexico) Diego Garijo	TKO (referee stoppage)	4	1:26	
Heavyweight 120 kg	(Mexico) Alejandro Solorzano	def.	(United States) Erik Leander	TKO (referee stoppage)	4	0:29	
Lightweight 62.5 kg	(United States) Travis Thompson	def.	(Brazil) Ivan Rodrigues Gutierrez	KO (punches)	2	1:59	
Preliminary Card
Lightweight 62.5 kg	(Mexico) Jesus Quevedo	def.	(Mexico) Sergio Herrera	TKO (punches)	4	1:19	
Welterweight 68 kg	(Mexico) Jose Ruelas	def.	(Mexico) Gilberto Aguilar	Decision (unanimous)	5	2:00	Judges' scorecards not read.
Heavyweight 120 kg	(United States) Shannon Ritch	def.	(Mexico) Omar Molina	KO (punches)	1	0:26	For the vacant Bare Knuckle Superfight Heavyweight Championship

== BKFC 5: Lobov vs. Knight ==
BKFC 5: Lobov vs. Knight
- Promotion: Bare Knuckle Fighting Championship
- Date: April 6, 2019
- Venue: Mississippi Coast Coliseum
- City: (United States) Biloxi, Mississippi, USA

BKFC 5: Lobov vs. Knight was a bare-knuckle fighting event held by Bare Knuckle Fighting Championship on April 6, 2019 at the Mississippi Coast Coliseum in Biloxi, USA.

=== Background ===
This event featured a fight between two UFC Veterans, Artem Lobov and Jason Knight in the main event. Also featured on this card was the semi-finals of a 8-Man Lightweight Tournament.

- Fight of the Year (2019): Artem Lobov vs. Jason Knight

=== Results ===
BKFC 5: Lobov vs. Knight
Weight Class				Method	Round	Time	Notes
Welterweight 68 kg	(Russia) Artem Lobov	def.	(United States) Jason Knight	Decision (unanimous)	5	2:00	48-47, 48-47, 48-46
Cruiserweight 93 kg	(United States) Chris Leben	def.	(United States) Justin Baesman	KO (punches)	1	0:25	
Women's Featherweight 57 kg	(United States) Christine Ferea	def.	(United States) Britain Hart	TKO (doctor stoppage)	2	1:09	For the vacant Police Gazette Women's Featherweight American Championship
Heavyweight 120 kg	(United States) Chase Sherman	vs.	(United States) Sam Shewmaker	Draw (split)	5	2:00	50-45, 47-48, 48-48
Lightweight 62.5 kg	(United States) Reggie Barnett Jr.	def.	(United States) Rusty Crowder	Decision (unanimous)	5	2:00	Lightweight Tournament Semi-Finals. 50-44, 50-44, 50-44.
Middleweight 75 kg	(United States) Isaac Vallie-Flagg	def.	(United States) Randy Hedderick	TKO (broken hand)	3	1:22	
Lightweight 62.5 kg	(United States) Johnny Bedford	def.	(Puerto Rico) Abdiel Velazquez	TKO (punches)	4	0:15	Lightweight Tournament Semi-Finals
Middleweight 75 kg	(United States) Harris Stephenson	def.	(United States) Khalib Harris	Decision (split)	5	2:00	50-47, 47-48, 49-46
Women's Featherweight 57 kg	(United States) Sheena Starr	def.	(United States) Ivana Coleman	KO (punches)	2	0:37	
Heavyweight 120 kg	(United States) Bobo O'Bannon	def.	(United States) Troy Beets	TKO (punches)	4		

== BKFC 6: Malignaggi vs. Lobov ==
BKFC 6: Malignaggi vs. Lobov
- Promotion: Bare Knuckle Fighting Championship
- Date: June 22, 2019
- Venue: Florida State Fairgrounds
- City: (United States) Tampa, Florida, USA

BKFC 6: Malignaggi vs. Lobov (also known as BKFC 6: The Line is Drawn) was a bare-knuckle boxing event held by Bare Knuckle Fighting Championship on June 22, 2019 at the Florida State Fairgrounds in Tampa, USA.

=== Background ===
The BKFC 6 main event was the highly anticipated bout between UFC veteran and The Ultimate Fighter 22 finalist, Artem Lobov against the former IBF junior welterweight and WBA welterweight champion, Paulie Malignaggi.

On the main card, the fight between Johnny Bedford and Reggie Barnett Jr. was the final in the BKFC Lightweight Tournament. The winner of this tournament was awarded the inaugural BKFC Lightweight Championship and Police Gazette Lightweight American Championship.

=== Results ===
BKFC 6: Malignaggi vs. Lobov
Weight Class				Method	Round	Time	Notes
Super Welterweight 70 kg	(Russia) Artem Lobov	def.	(United States) Paulie Malignaggi	Decision (unanimous)	5	2:00	48-47, 48-47, 48-47
Cruiserweight 93 kg	(United States) Dakota Cochrane	def.	(United States) Chris Leben	Decision (unanimous)	5	2:00	49-46, 49-46, 48-47
Lightweight 62.5 kg	(United States) Johnny Bedford	def.	(United States) Reggie Barnett Jr.	Decision (unanimous)	5	2:00	Tournament Final, for the vacant BKFC Lightweight Championship & Police Gazette American Championship. 47-45, 47-45, 48-44.
Middleweight 75 kg	(United States) Julian Lane	def.	(United States) Tom Shoaff	Decision (unanimous)	5	2:00	49-45, 49-45, 49-45
Heavyweight 120 kg	(United States) Joey Beltran	def.	(United States) Jamie Campbell	TKO (punches)	2	1:50	
Light Heavyweight 84 kg	(United States) Joe Riggs	-	(Brazil) Walber Barros	Draw (unanimous)	5	2:00	47-47, 47-47, 47-47
Super Welterweight 70 kg	(United States) Jim Alers	def.	(Puerto Rico) Elvin Brito	KO (punches)	1	0:45	
Light Heavyweight 84 kg	(United States) David Mundell	def.	(United States) Andrew Lipton	TKO (punches)	1	1:35	
Preliminary Card
Lightweight 62.5 kg	(Puerto Rico) Abdiel Velazquez	def.	(United States) Travis Thompson	Decision (unanimous)	5	2:00	49-46, 48-47, 50-45
Heavyweight 120 kg	(United States) Chris Boffil	def.	(United States) Jared Hayes	KO (punches)	3	1:55	

== BKFC 7: Alers vs. Garcia ==
BKFC 7: Alers vs. Garcia
- Promotion: Bare Knuckle Fighting Championship
- Date: August 10, 2019
- Venue: Mississippi Coast Coliseum
- City: (United States) Biloxi, Mississippi, USA

BKFC 7: Alers vs. Garcia was a bare-knuckle boxing event held by Bare Knuckle Fighting Championship on August 10, 2019 at the Mississippi Coast Coliseum in Biloxi, Mississippi, USA.

=== Background ===
This fight card featured UFC veterans Jim Alers and Leonard Garcia in the main event. The co-main event featured BKFC Heavyweight Champion and Police Gazette Heavyweight American Champion Arnold Adams defending both titles against UFC veteran Chase Sherman.

On the main card, Christine Ferea defended her Police Gazette Women's Featherweight American Championship against Helen Peralta in the first round of a 4-women featherweight tournament. Also announced for this tournament was the eventual cancelled bout of Corrine Laframboise vs. Sadie Ault.

=== Results ===
BKFC 7: Alers vs. Garcia
Weight Class				Method	Round	Time	Notes
Super Welterweight 70 kg	(United States) Jim Alers	def.	(United States) Leonard Garcia	TKO (punches)	1	1:38	
Heavyweight 120 kg	(United States) Chase Sherman	def.	(United States) Arnold Adams (c)	Decision (unanimous)	5	2:00	For the BKFC Heavyweight Championship & Police Gazette Heavyweight American Championship. 49-45, 49-45, 49-46.
Women's Featherweight 57 kg	(Dominican Republic) Helen Peralta	def.	(United States) Christine Ferea (c)	Decision (unanimous)	5	2:00	For the Police Gazette Women's Featherweight American Championship. 48-47, 48-47, 48-45.
Super Middleweight 80 kg	(United States) Isaac Vallie-Flagg	def.	(United States) Melvin Guillard	TKO (retirement)	3	2:00	
Super Welterweight 70 kg	(United States) Adam Pellerano	def.	(United States) Joshua Boudreaux	TKO (retirement)	2	1:30	
Middleweight 75 kg	(United States) Kaleb Harris	def.	(United States) Johnavan Vistante	KO (punch)	2	0:51	
Heavyweight 120 kg	(United States) Dale Sopi	def.	(United States) Juan Torres	Decision (unanimous)	5	2:00	49-46, 49-46, 48-47
Heavyweight 120 kg	(United States) Quentin Henry	def.	(United States) Brandon Malbrough	KO (punch)	1	1:55	

== BKFC 8: Silva vs. Gonzaga ==
BKFC 8: Silva vs. Gonzaga
- Promotion: Bare Knuckle Fighting Championship
- Date: October 19, 2019
- Venue: Florida State Fairgrounds
- City: (United States) Tampa, Florida, USA

BKFC 8: Silva vs. Gonzaga was a bare-knuckle boxing event held by Bare Knuckle Fighting Championship on October 19, 2019 at the Florida State Fairgrounds in Tampa, Florida, USA.

=== Background ===
The main event of BKFC 8 is set to feature both UFC veterans and former UFC heavyweight title challengers, Antônio "Bigfoot" Silva vs Gabriel Gonzaga.

=== Results ===
BKFC 8: Silva vs. Gonzaga
Weight Class				Method	Round	Time	Notes
Heavyweight 120 kg	(Brazil) Gabriel Gonzaga	def.	(Brazil) Antônio Silva	KO (punches)	2	1:50	
Super Welterweight 70 kg	(United States) Jim Alers	def.	(United States) Julian Lane	TKO (referee stoppage)	2	0:53	
Lightweight 62.5 kg	(United States) Dat Nguyen	def.	(United States) Travis Thompson	Decision (unanimous)	5	2:00	50-45, 50-45, 49-46
Lightweight 62.5 kg	(Puerto Rico) Abdiel Velazquez	def.	(United States) Rick Caruso	TKO (retirement)	2	0:11	
Cruiserweight 93 kg	(United States) Lorenzo Hunt	def.	(United States) Reggie Pena	TKO (doctor stoppage)	3	2:00	
Women's Featherweight 57 kg	(United States) Delaney Owen	def.	(United States) Sheena Starr	TKO (retirement)	2	1:01	
Light Heavyweight 84 kg	(United States) Joey Angelo	def.	(Brazil) Walber Barros	Decision (split)	5	2:00	48-47, 48-47, 49-46
Light Heavyweight 84 kg	(United States) David Mundell	def.	(United States) Ronnie Forney	TKO (punches)	2	1:09	
Preliminary Card
Cruiserweight 93 kg	(Cuba) Gustavo Trujillo	def.	(United States) Rob Morrow	KO (punch)	1	0:35	
Light Heavyweight 84 kg	(United States) Jared Warren	def.	(United States) Brian Maxwell	TKO (punches)	1	1:59	
Middleweight 75 kg	(United States) Zach Juusola	def.	(United States) Fred Pierce	KO (punches)	2	0:33	

== BKFC 9: Lobov vs. Knight II ==
BKFC 9: Lobov vs. Knight II
- Promotion: Bare Knuckle Fighting Championship
- Date: November 16, 2019
- Venue: Mississippi Coast Coliseum
- City: (United States) Biloxi, Mississippi, USA

BKFC 9: Lobov vs. Knight II was a bare-knuckle boxing event held by Bare Knuckle Fighting Championship on November 16, 2019 at the Mississippi Coast Coliseum in Biloxi, Mississippi, USA.

=== Background ===
The card was headline by a rematch between Artem Lobov and Jason Knight. The pair previously fought at Bare Knuckle FC 5 on April 6, 2019 with Lobov winning by unanimous decision.

=== Results ===
BKFC 9: Lobov vs. Knight II
Weight Class				Method	Round	Time	Notes
Welterweight 68 kg	(United States) Jason Knight	def.	(Russia) Artem Lobov	TKO (eye injury)	5	0:29	
Heavyweight 120 kg	(United States) Joey Beltran	def.	(United States) Chase Sherman (c)	Decision (unanimous)	5	2:00	For the BKFC Heavyweight Championship & Police Gazette Heavyweight American Championship. Judges' scorecards not read.
Welterweight 68 kg	(United States) Johnny Bedford	def.	(United States) Charles Bennett	TKO (Hand Injury)	2	2:00	
W.Featherweight 57 kg	(Dominican Republic) Helen Peralta	def.	(United States) Maia Kahunaele	KO (punches)	1	1:57	
Super Middleweight 80 kg	(United States) Kenny Licea	def.	(United States) Harris Stephenson	TKO (punches)	1	1:04	
Cruiserweight 93 kg	(United States) Chris Sarro	def.	(United States) John McAllister	KO (punches)	1	1:32	
Middleweight 75 kg	(United States) Kaleb Harris	def.	(United States) Jeff Chiffens	TKO (punches)	2	2:00	
Heavyweight 120 kg	(United States) Wes Combs	def.	(United States) Adrian Miles	DQ (grounded punch)	1		
Welterweight 68 kg	(United States) Adam Pellerano	vs.	(United States) Dillard Pegg	TKO (referee stoppage)	1	0:46	
