= Jim Alers =

American mixed martial arts fighter

- Born: October 14, 1986 (age 40); New York, New York, U.S.
- Other names: The Beast, The Bareknuckle Beast
- Height: 5 ft 9 in (1.75 m)
- Weight: 145 lb (66 kg; 10 st 5 lb)
- Division: Lightweight; Featherweight
- Reach: 73.0 in (185 cm)
- Style: Boxing
- Fighting out of: Pembroke Pines, Florida, U.S.
- Team: Gracie Barra Orlando; Alliance BJJ; American Top Team (2014–2015); MMA Masters; Alers Martial Arts
- Rank: Black belt in Brazilian Jiu-Jitsu under Vagner Rocha
- Years active: 2008–present

Mixed martial arts record
- Total: 20
- Wins: 14
- By knockout: 2
- By submission: 10
- By decision: 2
- Losses: 5
- By knockout: 2
- By submission: 1
- By decision: 2
- No contests: 1

Other information
- University: University of Central Florida
- Mixed martial arts record from Sherdog

Jim Alers (born October 14, 1986) is an American professional bare knuckle boxer. A professional MMA fighter from 2008 until 2018, he fought in the UFC and is the former Cage Warriors Featherweight Champion.

== Background ==
Alers attended University of Central Florida, where he graduated with a degree in elementary education. He began training in MMA at the age of 19.

== Mixed martial arts career ==
=== Early career ===
Alers began competing in mixed martial arts in 2006 and made his professional debut in 2008 competing in regional promotions primarily in the lightweight and featherweight divisions in his home state of Florida. He also had a stint in Cage Warriors, where he was featherweight champion. He signed with the UFC in early 2014.

=== Ultimate Fighting Championship ===
Alers made his promotional debut against Alan Omer on August 23, 2014 at UFC Fight Night 39, filling in for an injured Tim Elliott. He won the fight via split decision.

Alers was expected to face Lucas Martins on July 16, 2015 at UFC Fight Night 45. However, Alers pulled out of the bout citing injury, and was replaced by Alex White.

Alers faced Chas Skelly on February 14, 2015 at UFC Fight Night 60. He lost the fight via TKO in the closing seconds of the second round.

Alers next faced Cole Miller on December 19, 2015 at UFC on Fox 17. The bout was ruled a No Contest after Miller was accidentally poked in the eye by Alers in the second round and was unable to continue.

Alers faced Jason Knight on July 23, 2016 at UFC on Fox 20. He lost the fight via split decision.

=== Bare Knuckle Fighting Championship ===
On June 22, 2019, Jim Alers defeated Elvin Brito via KO at 0:45 in round 1 at BKFC 6.

On August 10, 2019, Jim Alers defeated Leonard Garcia via TKO at 1:38 in round 1 at BKFC 7.

On October 19, 2019, Jim Alers defeated Julian Lane via TKO at 0:53 in round 2 at BKFC 8. After the fight, Alers stated he wants a shot at the title and wants to face the winner of Artem Lobov and Jason Knight.

Alers faced Kaleb Harris in the BKFC Super Welterweight Tournament quarterfinals at BKFC 10 on February 15, 2020. He won the fight via majority decision.

Alers is next expected to challenge Luis Palomino for the BKFC Super Welterweight Championship at BKFC 14 on November 14, 2020.

Alers lost his bout against Palomino via TKO stoppage for the BKFC championship

== Professional grappling career ==
Alers competed in the welterweight edition of the 2023 Combat jiu-jitsu world championships on Jun 6, 2021. He submitted Bobby Emmons in the opening round with a rear-naked choke, before being submitted himself by Roberto Jimenez in the quarter-finals with a triangle armbar.

He was then invited to compete in the absolute grand prix at Submission Underground 24 on June 17, 2021. Both Alers and fellow MMA veteran Ronny Markes withdrew from the event on short notice, being replaced by Nick Maximov and Adam Sidelinger.

Alers was invited to compete in the welterweight edition of the 2023 Combat jiu-jitsu world championships on March 26, 2023.

== Championships and accomplishments ==
=== Mixed martial arts ===
- Cage Warriors Fighting Championship
  - CWFC Featherweight Championship (One time)

== Mixed martial arts record ==
Professional record breakdown
| 20 matches | 14 wins | 5 losses |
| By knockout | 2 | 2 |
| By submission | 10 | 1 |
| By decision | 2 | 2 |
| No contests | 1 | |

| Res. | Record | Opponent | Method | Event | Date | Round | Time | Location | Notes |
|---|---|---|---|---|---|---|---|---|---|
| Loss | 14–5 (1) | Enrique Gonzalez | Decision (unanimous) | Combate Global: USA vs. Mexico | November 12, 2021 | 1 | 5:00 | Miami, Florida, United States | Combate Global Bantamweight QuarterFinals. |
| Loss | 14–4 (1) | Marif Piraev | Submission (anaconda choke) | Crimea Rush | August 29, 2018 | 2 | 2:26 | Crimea, Ukraine | |
| Win | 14–3 (1) | Elvin Leon Brito | Technical Submission (triangle choke) | Combat Night Pro 3 | July 29, 2017 | 3 | 3:07 | Casselberry, Florida, United States | Return to Lightweight. |
| Loss | 13–3 (1) | Jason Knight | Decision (split) | UFC on Fox: Holm vs. Shevchenko | July 23, 2016 | 3 | 5:00 | Chicago, Illinois, United States | Fight of the Night. |
| NC | 13–2 (1) | Cole Miller | NC (accidental eye poke) | UFC on Fox: dos Anjos vs. Cowboy 2 | December 19, 2015 | 2 | 1:44 | Orlando, Florida, United States | Eyepoke rendered Miller unable to continue. |
| Loss | 13–2 | Chas Skelly | TKO (punches and knee) | UFC Fight Night: Henderson vs. Thatch | February 14, 2015 | 2 | 4:59 | Broomfield, Colorado, United States | |
| Win | 13–1 | Alan Omer | Decision (split) | UFC Fight Night: Nogueira vs. Nelson | April 11, 2014 | 3 | 5:00 | Abu Dhabi, United Arab Emirates | |
| Win | 12–1 | Graham Turner | Submission (rear-naked choke) | CWFC 63 | December 31, 2013 | 2 | 1:22 | Dublin, Ireland | Defended the Cage Warriors Featherweight Championship. |
| Win | 11–1 | Martin Svensson | Decision (unanimous) | CWFC 59 | September 14, 2013 | 5 | 5:00 | Cardiff, Wales | Defended the Cage Warriors Featherweight Championship. |
| Win | 10–1 | Joni Salovaara | Submission (triangle armbar) | CWFC 53 | April 13, 2013 | 4 | 3:43 | Glasgow, Scotland | Won the vacant Cage Warriors Featherweight Championship. |
| Win | 9–1 | Marcio Cesar | Submission (D'Arce choke) | Cage Warriors Fight Night 7 | September 1, 2012 | 2 | 2:27 | Amman, Jordan | |
| Win | 8–1 | Matteus Lähdesmäki | TKO (elbows) | Cage Warriors Fight Night 6 | May 24, 2012 | 2 | 3:01 | Isa Town, Bahrain | Return to Featherweight. |
| Win | 7–1 | Noe Quintanilla | Submission (rear-naked choke) | CDMMA: Complete Devastation 3 | February 25, 2012 | 1 | 0:48 | Altoona, Pennsylvania, United States | Lightweight debut. |
| Win | 6–1 | Denis Hernandez | Submission (rear-naked choke) | Ultimate Alliance Fights 1 | November 10, 2011 | 1 | 1:46 | Miami, Florida, United States | |
| Win | 5–1 | Matt Kersse | Submission (guillotine choke) | AOF 11 | February 19, 2011 | 1 | 1:12 | Tampa, Florida, United States | |
| Loss | 4–1 | Ronald Jacobs | TKO (punches) | AOF 7 | April 3, 2010 | 1 | 0:24 | Tampa, Florida, United States | |
| Win | 4–0 | Freddy Assuncao | Submission (rear-naked choke) | AOF 6 | November 22, 2009 | 2 | 4:55 | Estero, Florida, United States | |
| Win | 3–0 | David Gomez | KO (punches) | RFC 18 | July 24, 2009 | 1 | 3:18 | Tampa, Florida, United States | |
| Win | 2–0 | Brent Silva | Submission (rear-naked choke) | CWFC USA: Destruction | January 30, 2009 | 1 | 4:16 | Orlando, Florida, United States | |
| Win | 1–0 | Brandon Ocasio | Submission (triangle choke) | CWFC USA: Unleashed | August 23, 2008 | 1 | 3:50 | Orlando, Florida, United States | Featherweight debut. |

== Bare knuckle record ==
Professional record breakdown
| 5 matches | 4 wins | 1 loss |
| By knockout | 3 | 1 |
| By decision | 1 | 0 |

| Res. | Record | Opponent | Method | Event | Date | Round | Time | Location | Notes |
|---|---|---|---|---|---|---|---|---|---|
| Loss | 4–1 | Luis Palomino | TKO (punches) | BKFC 14 | November 13, 2020 | 1 | 0:44 | Miami, Florida, United States | For the BKFC 155-pound championship |
| Win | 4–0 | Kaleb Harris | Decision (majority) | BKFC 10 | February 15, 2020 | 5 | 2:00 | Fort Lauderdale, Florida, United States | Super Welterweight Tournament Quarter-Finals |
| Win | 3–0 | Julian Lane | TKO (punches) | BKFC 8 | October 19, 2019 | 2 | 0:53 | Tampa, Florida, United States | |
| Win | 2–0 | Leonard Garcia | TKO (punches) | BKFC 7 | August 10, 2019 | 1 | 1:38 | Biloxi, Mississippi, United States | |
| Win | 1–0 | Elvin Brito | KO (punch) | BKFC 6 | June 22, 2019 | 1 | 0:45 | Tampa, Florida, United States | |

== See also ==
- List of current UFC fighters
- List of male mixed martial artists
