= 2025 in Bare Knuckle Fighting Championship =

Information
- First date: January 18, 2025

Events
- Total events: 33

Fights
- Total fights: 347
- Title fights: 22

Chronology
2024 in BKFC	2025 in Bare Knuckle Fighting Championship	2026 in BKFC

The year 2025 was the eighth year in the history of the Bare Knuckle Fighting Championship, a bare-knuckle fighting promotion based in Philadelphia.

== Background ==
The 2025 season started with BKFC Fight Night Pechanga: Kurdanov vs. Brito on January 18, 2025.

== List of events ==
#	Event	Date	Venue	Location
1	BKFC Fight Night Pechanga: Kurdanov vs. Brito	January 18, 2025	Pechanga Resort Casino	Temecula, California, United States
2	BKFC Knucklemania V	January 25, 2025	Wells Fargo Center	Philadelphia, Pennsylvania, United States
3	BKFC on DAZN Mohegan Sun: Lane vs. VanCamp	February 1, 2025	Mohegan Sun Arena	Uncasville, Connecticut, United States
4	BKFC Fight Night Newcastle: Thompson vs. Boardman	February 8, 2025	Walker Activity Dome	Newcastle upon Tyne, England
5	BKFC Fight Night Albuquerque: Richardson vs. Usmanov	February 28, 2025	Kiva Auditorium	Albuquerque, New Mexico, United States
6	BKFC Fight Night Philly: Pague vs. Angelcor	March 21, 2025	2300 Arena	Philadelphia, Pennsylvania, United States
7	BKFC 70 Hollywood, FL: Palomino vs. Davis	March 27, 2025	Seminole Hard Rock Hotel & Casino Hollywood	Hollywood, Florida, United States
8	BKFC Fight Night Manchester: Chipchase vs. Fox	March 29, 2025	Planet Ice	Altrincham, England
9	BKFC 71 Dubai Day 1: Trout vs. Trinidad-Snake	April 4, 2025	Dubai Tennis Stadium	Dubai, United Arab Emirates
10	BKFC 72 Dubai Day 2: Stewart vs. Strydom	April 5, 2025	Dubai Tennis Stadium	Dubai, United Arab Emirates
11	BKFC Fight Night Omaha: Cochrane vs. Edwards	April 18, 2025	The Astro	Omaha, Nebraska, United States
12	BKFC 73 Italy: Camozzi vs. Bicchi	April 26, 2025	Palazzo Wanny	Florence, Italy
13	BKFC Fight Night Clearwater: Warren vs. Creer	May 2, 2025	OCC Road House & Museum	Clearwater, Florida, United States
14	BKFC 74 Salt Lake City: Richman vs. Dyer	May 11, 2025	Maverik Center	West Valley City, Utah, United States
15	BKFC 75 Albuquerque: Mundell vs. Sanchez	June 6, 2025	Tingley Coliseum	Albuquerque, New Mexico, United States
16	BKFC Fight Night Mohegan Sun: Porter vs. Cleckler	June 14, 2025	Mohegan Sun Arena	Uncasville, Connecticut, United States
17	BKFC 76 Texas: Tenaglia vs. Soto	June 21, 2025	Dickies Arena	Fort Worth, Texas, United States
18	BKFC 77 Birmingham: Tierney vs. Christie	June 28, 2025	bp pulse LIVE	Birmingham, England
19	BKFC 78 Hollywood, FL: Perdomo vs. Adams	July 12, 2025	Seminole Hard Rock Hotel & Casino Hollywood	Hollywood, Florida, United States
20	BKFC Fight Night Philly: Pague vs. Petersen	July 25, 2025	2300 Arena	Philadelphia, Pennsylvania, United States
21	BKFC 79 Sturgis: Gogo vs. Lane	August 2, 2025	Buffalo Chip Campground	Sturgis, South Dakota, United States
22	BKFC Fight Night Edmonton: Stuve vs. Manno	August 9, 2025	River Cree Resort and Casino	Enoch, Alberta, Canada
23	BKFC Fight Night Montenegro: Bakočević vs. Ott	August 30, 2025	Top Hill	Budva, Montenegro
24	BKFC 80 Hollywood, FL: Perdomo vs. Adams 2	September 12, 2025	Seminole Hard Rock Hotel & Casino Hollywood	Hollywood, Florida, United States
25	BKFC 81 Manchester: DeGale vs. Floyd	September 27, 2025	AO Arena	Manchester, England
26	BKFC 82 Newark: Perry vs. Stephens	October 4, 2025	Prudential Center	Newark, New Jersey, United States
27	BKFC Fight Night Hammond: Henry vs. Stewart	October 18, 2025	Horseshoe Hammond	Hammond, Indiana, United States
28	BKFC 83 Italy: Camozzi vs. Sakara	October 25, 2025	Palazzetto dello Sport	Rome, Italy
29	BKFC Fight Night Michigan: Rodriguez vs. Cavender	November 1, 2025	Soaring Eagle Casino	Mount Pleasant, Michigan, United States
30	BKFC 84 Palm Desert: Dyer vs. Hunt 2	November 15, 2025	Acrisure Arena	Thousand Palms, California, United States
31	BKFC 85 Hollywood, FL: Trout vs. Palomino 2	December 5, 2025	Seminole Hard Rock Hotel & Casino Hollywood, United States	(United States) Hollywood, Florida
32	BKFC Fight Night Derby: Cooke vs. Holmes	December 13, 2025	Vaillant Live	Derby, England
33	BKFC Fight Night Mohegan Sun: Porter vs. Garrett	December 20, 2025	Mohegan Sun Arena	Uncasville, Connecticut, United States

== BKFC Fight Night Pechanga: Kurdanov vs. Brito ==
BKFC Fight Night Pechanga: Kurdanov vs. Brito
- Promotion: Bare Knuckle Fighting Championship
- Date: January 18, 2025
- Venue: Pechanga Resort Casino
- City: Temecula, California

BKFC Fight Night Pechanga: Kurdanov vs. Brito (also known as BKFC Fight Night 19) was a bare-knuckle fighting event to be held by Bare Knuckle Fighting Championship on January 18, 2025.

=== Background ===
A welterweight bout between Evgeny Kurdanov and Elvin Brito headlined this event.

=== Fight card ===
BKFC Fight Night Pechanga: Kurdanov vs. Brito
Weight Class				Method	Round	Time	Notes
Welterweight 75 kg	(Russia) Evgeny Kurdanov	def.	(Puerto Rico) Elvin Brito	Decision (unanimous) (50-45, 49-46, 49-46)	5	2:00	
Lightweight 70 kg	(United States) Robbie Peralta	def.	(United States) JorDan Christensen	Decision (unanimous) (50-45, 49-46, 49-46)	5	2:00	
Welterweight 75 kg	(United States) Ryan Petersen	def.	(Canada) Matthew Socholotiuk	Decision (unanimous) (49-46, 49-46, 50-45)	5	2:00	
Welterweight 75 kg	(United States) Rodney Thomas	def.	(United States) Art Driscoll	Decision (unanimous) (49-44, 49-44, 48-45)	5	2:00	
Lightweight 70 kg	(United States) Mike Andaya	def.	(Canada) Dan Godoy	TKO	2	0:45	
Heavyweight 120 kg	(United States) Caleb Joseph Avila	def.	(United States) Tylor Sijohn	TKO	3	1:25	
Heavyweight 120 kg	(United States) Iman Williams	def.	(United States) Gabriel Mota	KO	1	1:54	
Middleweight 79 kg	(United States) Jeremy Sauceda	def.	(United States) Luis Villasenor	TKO	1	0:38	
Flyweight 57 kg	(United States) Justyn Martinez	def.	(United States) Alexander Prince Gutierrez	TKO	1	1:05	

== BKFC Knucklemania V ==
BKFC Knucklemania V
- Promotion: Bare Knuckle Fighting Championship
- Date: January 25, 2025
- Venue: Wells Fargo Center
- City: Philadelphia, Pennsylvania
- Attendance: 17,762

BKFC Knucklemania V was a bare-knuckle fighting event held by Bare Knuckle Fighting Championship on January 25, 2025.

=== Background ===
A bout between former UFC Lightweight Champion (also former two-time Bellator Lightweight Champion and Bellator Season 1 Lightweight Tournament Winner) Eddie Alvarez and Jeremy Stephens headlined the event. A BKFC World Heavyweight Championship bout between champion Mick Terrill and Ben Rothwell took place at the event.

Influencer Bryce Hall was scheduled compete at this event against Kevin Ferguson Jr. (Kimbo Slice Jr.). However, Ferguson Jr. pulled out for unknown reasons and the bout was scrapped.

Dustin Pague and JD Burns were scheduled to compete at this event but the bout was scrapped due to medical reasons.

=== Bonus awards ===
The following fighters were awarded bonuses:

- Fight of the Night: Itso Babulaidze vs. Bryan McDowell
- Knockout of the Night: Brandon Meyer, Ben Rothwell and Kaine Tomlinson Jr.

=== Fight Card ===
BKFC Knucklemania V
Weight Class				Method	Round	Time	Notes
Welterweight 75 kg	(United States) Jeremy Stephens	def.	(United States) Eddie Alvarez	TKO (corner stoppage)	3	2:00	
Heavyweight 120 kg	(United States) Ben Rothwell	def.	(England) Mick Terrill (c)	KO	1	0:36	For the BKFC World Heavyweight Championship.
W.Flyweight 57 kg	(Australia) Bec Rawlings	def.	(United States) Taylor Starling	Decision (unanimous) (50-44, 50-44, 49-45)	5	2:00	
Heavyweight 120 kg	(United States) Pat Brady	def.	(United States) Zach Calmus	TKO	1	0:53	
Middleweight 79 kg	(United States) John Garbarino	def.	(United States) Apostle Spencer	KO	1	0:59	
Welterweight 75 kg	(United States) Kaine Tomlinson, Jr.	def.	(United States) Pat Sullivan	KO	1	0:37	
Heavyweight 120 kg	(United States) Steve Banks	def.	(United States) Joey Dawejko	TKO	3	1:54	
Lightweight 70 kg	(United States) Brandon Meyer	def.	(United States) Zedekiah Montanez	KO	2	0:39	
Bantamweight 61 kg	(United States) Travis Thompson	def.	(United States) Zachary Pannell	KO	2	0:41	
Preliminary Card
Bantamweight 61 kg	(United States) Phil Caracappa	def.	(United States) Noah Norman	DQ	4	0:40	
Middleweight 79 kg	(United States) Cody Russell	def.	(United States) Logan Tucker	KO	3	0:48	
Middleweight 79 kg	(United States) Itso Babulaidze	def.	(United States) Bryan McDowell	Decision (unanimous) (48-42, 47-43, 48-42)	5	2:00	

== BKFC on DAZN Mohegan Sun: Lane vs. VanCamp ==
BKFC on DAZN Mohegan Sun: Lane vs. VanCamp
- Promotion: Bare Knuckle Fighting Championship
- Date: February 1, 2025
- Venue: Mohegan Sun Arena
- City: Uncasville, Connecticut

BKFC on DAZN Mohegan Sun: Lane vs. VanCamp (also known as BKFC on DAZN 4) was a bare-knuckle fighting event held by Bare Knuckle Fighting Championship on February 1, 2025.

=== Background ===
A welterweight bout between Julian Lane and former UFC fighter Cameron VanCamp headlined the event.

=== Fight card ===
BKFC on DAZN Mohegan Sun: Lane vs. VanCamp
Weight Class				Method	Round	Time	Notes
Welterweight 75 kg	(United States) Julian Lane	def.	(United States) Cameron VanCamp	KO	4	0:54	
Middleweight 79 kg	(United States) Brennan Ward	def.	(United States) James Dennis	KO	1	0:38	
Middleweight 79 kg	(United States) Dakota Cochrane	def.	(United States) Will Santiago	TKO	3	1:03	
Featherweight 66 kg	(United States) Rico DiSciullo	def.	(United States) Anthony Foye	TKO	3	1:08	
Heavyweight 120 kg	(Cape Verde) Yorgan De Castro	def.	(United States) Bobby Brents	TKO (hematoma)	2	2:00	
Heavyweight 120 kg	(United States) Parker Porter	def.	(United States) Chase Gormley	KO	1	0:44	
Flyweight 57 kg	(United States) Andrew Strode	def.	(United States) Tyler Randall	Decision (unanimous) (50-45, 50-45, 50-45)	5	2:00	
Bantamweight 61 kg	(United States) Sito Navarro	def.	(United States) Jack Grady	TKO	4	1:44	
Preliminary Card
Featherweight 66 kg	(United States) Jared Lennon	def.	(United States) Jacob Kreitel	TKO	2	0:45	
Welterweight 75 kg	(United States) Spencer Meehan	def.	(United States) Grady Wall	TKO (shoulder injury)	1	0:22	

== BKFC Fight Night Newcastle: Thompson vs. Boardman ==
BKFC Fight Night Newcastle: Thompson vs. Boardman
- Promotion: Bare Knuckle Fighting Championship
- Date: February 8, 2025
- Venue: Walker Activity Dome
- City: Newcastle upon Tyne, England

BKFC Fight Night Newcastle: Thompson vs. Boardman (also known as BKFC Fight Night 20 and BKFC UK 10) was a bare-knuckle fighting event held by Bare Knuckle Fighting Championship on February 8, 2025.

=== Background ===
A bout for the vacant BKFC UK Cruiserweight Championship bout between Karl Thompson and Rob Boardman headlined the event.

=== Fight card ===
BKFC Fight Night Newcastle: Thompson vs. Boardman
Weight Class				Method	Round	Time	Notes
Cruiserweight 93 kg	(United Kingdom) Karl Thompson	def.	(United Kingdom) Rob Boardman	TKO	1	1:46	For the vacant BKFC UK Cruiserweight Championship.
Middleweight 79 kg	(United Kingdom) Pic Jardine	def.	(United Kingdom) Tony Shields	Decision (unanimous)	5	2:00	49-46, 49-46, 50-45
Lightweight 70 kg	(United Kingdom) Lewis Keen	def.	(United Kingdom) Ryan McCarthy	Decision (unanimous)	5	2:00	50-45, 50-45, 50-45
Welterweight 75 kg	(United Kingdom) Paul Cook	def.	(United Kingdom) Adam Grogan	TKO	4	0:25	
Heavyweight 120 kg	(United Kingdom) Travis Dickinson	def.	(United Kingdom) Rowan Gregory	TKO	2	2:00	
Light Heavyweight 84 kg	(United Kingdom) Joe Lister	def.	(United Kingdom) John Ferguson	TKO	1	1:48	
Bantamweight 61 kg	(United Kingdom) Lewis Garside	def.	(United Kingdom) Bartek Kanabey	Decision (unanimous)	5	2:00	50-43, 50-43, 50-43
Welterweight 75 kg	(United Kingdom) Brandon Comby	def.	(United Kingdom) Ryan Carmichael	Decision (unanimous)	5	2:00	50-45, 50-45, 50-45
Welterweight 75 kg	(United Kingdom) Mikey Henderson	def.	(Australia) Liam Hutchinson	Decision (unanimous)	5	2:00	50-45, 50-45, 49-47
Light Heavyweight 84 kg	(United Kingdom) Leigh Cohoon	def.	(United Kingdom) Mpampis Klados	TKO	3	0:33	
Heavyweight 120 kg	(United Kingdom) James Walker	def.	(United Kingdom) Jan Sulecki	Decision (unanimous)	5	2:00	50-44, 50-44, 50-44
Welterweight 75 kg	(United Kingdom) Oscar Smykiel	def.	(United Kingdom) Alan Comby	TKO	1	1:49	
Featherweight 66 kg	(South Africa) Tommy Strydom	def.	(United Kingdom) John Spencer	TKO	3	1:18	

== BKFC Fight Night Albuquerque: Richardson vs. Usmanov ==
BKFC Fight Night Albuquerque: Richardson vs. Usmanov
- Promotion: Bare Knuckle Fighting Championship
- Date: February 28, 2025
- Venue: Kiva Auditorium
- City: Albuquerque, New Mexico, United States

BKFC Fight Night Albuquerque: Richardson vs. Usmanov (also known as BKFC Fight Night 21) was a bare-knuckle fighting held by Bare Knuckle Fighting Championship on February 28, 2025.

=== Background ===
A bantamweight bout between former BKFC Bantamweight Champion Keith Richardson and Bekhzod Usmonov headlined the event.

=== Fight card ===
BKFC Fight Night Albuquerque: Richardson vs. Usmanov
Weight Class				Method	Round	Time	Notes
Bantamweight 61 kg	(Tajikistan) Bekhzod Usmonov	def.	(United States) Keith Richardson	KO	1	0:55	
Light Heavyweight 84 kg	(United States) Donald Sanchez	def.	(United States) Harrison Aiken	Decision (unanimous) (49-43, 49-43, 48-44)	5	2:00	
Welterweight 75 kg	(United States) Derrick Findley	def.	(United States) Felipe Chavez	KO	3	1:59	
Featherweight 66 kg	(United States) Eric Dodson	def.	(United States) Van Vo	TKO	3	0:17	
Bantamweight 61 kg	(United States) Derek Perez	def.	(United States) Mike Livingston	TKO	1	1:58	
Cruiserweight 93 kg	(Russia) Murat Kilimetov	def.	(United States) Lamont Stafford	TKO	1	1:01	
Light Heavyweight 84 kg	(United States) William Albrecht	def.	(United States) Brett Fields	TKO	1	1:35	
Flyweight 57 kg	(United States) Justyn Martinez	def.	(United States) Zay Garcia	TKO	1	1:40	
Light Heavyweight 84 kg	(United States) Jay Jackson	def.	(United States) Kyle McElroy	TKO	3	2:00	
Lightweight 70 kg	(United States) Lorenzo Coca	def.	(United States) Ruben Arroyo	TKO	2	2:00	
Featherweight 66 kg	(United States) Roderick Stewart	def.	(United States) Bryant McClain	TKO	1	1:16	

== BKFC Fight Night Philly: Pague vs. Angelcor ==
BKFC Fight Night Philly: Pague vs. Angelcor
- Promotion: Bare Knuckle Fighting Championship
- Date: March 21, 2025
- Venue: 2300 Arena
- City: Philadelphia, Pennsylvania, United States

BKFC Fight Night Philly: Pague vs. Angelcor (also known as BKFC Fight Night 22) was a bare-knuckle fighting event held by Bare Knuckle Fighting Championship on March 21, 2025.

=== Background ===
A welterweight bout between Dustin Pague and Andrew Angelcor headlined the event.

=== Fight card ===
BKFC Fight Night Philly: Pague vs. Angelcor
Weight Class				Method	Round	Time	Notes
Welterweight 61 kg	(United States) Dustin Pague	def.	(United States) Andrew Angelcor	TKO	2	2:00	
Light Heavyweight 84 kg	(United States) Brandon Conley	vs.	(United States) Cody Vidal	Draw (majority) (47-47, 47-47, 48-46)	5	2:00	
Middleweight 79 kg	(United States) John Garbarino	def.	(United States) Rayne Wells	KO	1	0:47	
Bantamweight 61 kg	(United States) AJ Craig	def.	(United States) Travis Thompson	Decision (unanimous) (47-46, 47-46, 48-45)	5	2:00	
Light Heavyweight 84 kg	(United States) Maurice Horne	def.	(Canada) Adam De Freitas	KO	2	1:08	
Heavyweight 120 kg	(United States) Lex Ludlow	def.	(United States) Connor McKenna	Decision (split) (49-46, 48-47, 47-48)	5	2:00	
Welterweight 75 kg	(United States) Dalvin Blair	def.	(United States) Justin Walters	KO	1	0:04	
Featherweight 66 kg	(United States) Elijah Harris	def.	(United States) Brandon Honsvick	KO	1	0:07	
Heavyweight 120 kg	(United States) Pat Carroll	def.	(United States) Alex Davis	KO	1	0:46	
Lightweight 70 kg	(United States) Anthony Pagan	def.	(United States) Colin Reeser	TKO	1	0:52	

== BKFC 70 Hollywood, FL: Palomino vs. Davis ==
BKFC 70 Hollywood, FL: Palomino vs. Davis
- Promotion: Bare Knuckle Fighting Championship
- Date: March 27, 2025
- Venue: Seminole Hard Rock Hotel & Casino Hollywood
- City: Hollywood, Florida

BKFC 70 Hollywood, FL: Palomino vs. Davis was a bare-knuckle fighting event held by Bare Knuckle Fighting Championship on March 27, 2025.

=== Background ===
A lightweight bout for the inaugural BKFC King of Streets Championship between former BKFC Welterweight Champion (also former BKFC Lightweight Champion) Luis Palomino and Howard Davis headlined the event.

=== Bonus awards ===
The following fighters were awarded bonuses:

- Fight of the Night: Luis Palomino vs. Howard Davis
- Knockout of the Night: Leonardo Perdomo
- Performance Bonuses: Justin Ibarrola and Peter Peraza

=== Fight card ===
BKFC 70 Hollywood, FL: Palomino vs. Davis
Weight Class				Method	Round	Time	Notes
Lightweight 70 kg	(Peru) Luis Palomino	def.	(United States) Howard Davis	Decision (unanimous) (49-46, 49-46, 48-47)	5	2:00	For the inaugural BKFC King of Streets Championship.
Heavyweight 120 kg	(Cuba) Leonardo Perdomo	def.	(United States) Steve Hérélius	KO	1	0:13	
Bantamweight 61 kg	(United States) Justin Ibarrola	def.	(Puerto Rico) Abdiel Velazquez	KO	2	1:27	
Flyweight 57 kg	(United States) Justin Street	def.	(United States) Matt Russo	TKO	2	2:00	
Cruiserweight 93 kg	(United States) Julio Perez Rodriguez	def.	(United States) Lewis Glover	TKO	2	1:15	
Featherweight 66 kg	(Nicaragua) Edgard Plazaola	def.	(United States) Louie Lopez	TKO	3	1:43	
Bantamweight 61 kg	(United States) Robert Armas	def.	(United States) Chris Garcia	Decision (unanimous) (50-45, 50-45, 48-47)	5	2:00	
Welterweight 75 kg	(United States) Peter Peraza	def.	(United States) Kaine Tomlinson Jr.	KO	3	0:37	
Bantamweight 61 kg	(United States) AJ Rodriguez	def.	(United States) Corey Roberts	TKO	3	1:39	
Heavyweight 120 kg	(United States) Bear Hill	def.	(United States) Nicholas Blume	TKO	3	2:00	
Flyweight 57 kg	(Puerto Rico) Jan Carlos Rivera	def.	(United States) Juan Inclan	Decision (unanimous) (50-45, 50-45, 49-46)	5	2:00	

== BKFC Fight Night Manchester: Chipchase vs. Fox ==
BKFC Fight Night Manchester: Chipchase vs. Fox
- Promotion: Bare Knuckle Fighting Championship
- Date: March 29, 2025
- Venue: Planet Ice
- City: Altrincham, England

BKFC Fight Night Manchester: Chipchase vs. Fox (also known as BKFC Fight Night 23 and BKFC UK 11) was a bare-knuckle fighting event held by Bare Knuckle Fighting Championship on March 29, 2025.

=== Background ===
A bout for the vacant BKFC UK Featherweight Championship bout between Jonno Chipchase and Gary Fox headlined the event. Ellis Shepherd, who won the championship on April 6, 2024, vacated the belt for unknown reasons.

A middleweight bout between former British and Commonwealth super-middleweight boxing champion Jack Cullen and Jakub Kosicki was the co-main event.

=== Fight card ===
BKFC Fight Night Manchester: Chipchase vs. Fox
Weight Class				Method	Round	Time	Notes
Featherweight 66 kg	(United Kingdom) Gary Fox	def.	(United Kingdom) Jonno Chipchase	TKO	1	2:00	For the vacant BKFC UK Featherweight Championship.
Middleweight 79 kg	(United Kingdom) Jack Cullen	def.	(Poland) Jakub Kosicki	TKO (doctor stoppage)	1	1:24	
Light Heavyweight 84 kg	(United Kingdom) Conor Cooke	def.	(United Kingdom) Stevie Taylor	KO	1	1:01	
Heavyweight 120 kg	(United Kingdom) Gaz Corran	def.	(United Kingdom) Dawid Chylinski	TKO	1	1:20	
Light Heavyweight 84 kg	(United Kingdom) Matty Hodgson	def.	(United Kingdom) Danny Moir	TKO	2	0:30	
Welterweight 75 kg	(Poland) Bartlomiej Krol	def.	(United Kingdom) Simeon Otley	Decision (unanimous) (49-46, 49-46, 50-45)	5	2:00	
Light Heavyweight 84 kg	(United Kingdom) Dec Spelman	def.	(Czech Republic) Tomáš Lejsek	Decision (unanimous) (50-44, 50-44, 50-44)	5	2:00	
Cruiserweight 93 kg	(Poland) Dawid Oscar	def.	(Bulgaria) Stanoy Tabakov	TKO	2	0:26	
Light Heavyweight 84 kg	(United Kingdom) Danny Mitchell	def.	(United Kingdom) Benjamin Lowe	Decision (unanimous) (50-42, 50-42, 48-44)	5	2:00	
Heavyweight 120 kg	(United Kingdom) Leigh Cohoon	def.	(United Kingdom) Jimmy McCrory	TKO	2	0:53	
Welterweight 75 kg	(United Kingdom) Liam Dooley	def.	(United Kingdom) David Round	KO	1	0:14	
W.Flyweight 57 kg	(Republic of Ireland) Sinéadh Ní Nualláin	def.	(United Kingdom) Mathilda Wilson	Decision (unanimous) (48-47, 49-46, 49-46)	5	2:00	

== BKFC 71 Dubai Day 1: Trout vs. Trinidad-Snake ==
BKFC 71 Dubai Day 1: Trout vs. Trinidad-Snake
- Promotion: Bare Knuckle Fighting Championship
- Date: April 4, 2025
- Venue: Dubai Tennis Stadium
- City: Dubai, United Arab Emirates

BKFC 71 Dubai Day 1: Trout vs. Trinidad-Snake was a bare-knuckle fighting event to be held by Bare Knuckle Fighting Championship on April 4, 2025.

=== Background ===
This is the first BKFC event that consists of two days.

A BKFC Welterweight Championship bout between current champion Austin Trout and undefeated contender Carlos Trinidad-Snake headlined the event. A BKFC Women's Strawweight Championship bout between current champion Britain Hart and Tai Emery was the co-main event.

Former fighter Aleksei Oleinik made his promotional debut against Gerônimo dos Santos.

=== Fight card ===
BKFC 71 Dubai Day 1: Trout vs. Trinidad-Snake
Weight Class				Method	Round	Time	Notes
Welterweight 75 kg	(United States) Austin Trout	def.	(United States) Carlos Trinidad-Snake	Decision (split) (58-55, 55-58, 57-56)	6	2:00	For the BKFC Welterweight Championship. The first five rounds went to a draw
W.Strawweight 52 kg	(United States) Britain Hart	def.	(Australia) Tai Emery	Decision (unanimous) (48-47, 48-47, 50-45)	5	2:00	For the BKFC Women's Strawweight Championship.
Middleweight 79 kg	(Canada) Jonny Tello	def.	(United States) Sabah Homasi	Decision (unanimous) (48-45, 48-45, 47-46)	5	2:00	
Heavyweight 120 kg	(Brazil) Gerônimo dos Santos	def.	(Russia) Aleksei Oleinik	KO	1	1:49	
Welterweight 75 kg	(United States) Adel Altamimi	def.	(Spain) David Mora	KO	3	1:28	
Lightweight 70 kg	(Egypt) Ahmed Khairy	def.	(Brazil) Leandro Martins	TKO	3	1:01	
Middleweight 79 kg	(Bulgaria) Mladen Iliev	def.	(Algeria) Aboubkeur Houari	KO	2	0:23	
Heavyweight 120 kg	(Egypt) Mohamed Aly	def.	(United Arab Emirates) Jaskaran Singh	TKO	1	0:59	
Bantamweight 61 kg	(Egypt) Mahmoud Ahmed	def.	(Azerbaijan) Fuad Tarverdi	Decision (unanimous) (47-46, 47-46, 46-47)	5	2:00	
Middleweight 79 kg	(Azerbaijan) Elnur Suleymanov	def.	(United Arab Emirates) Lucas Sontgen	KO	2	0:14	
Lightweight 70 kg	(Austria) Islam Siszbulatow	def.	(United Arab Emirates) Cheng Leang	KO	1	0:40	

== BKFC 72 Dubai Day 2: Stewart vs. Strydom ==
BKFC 72 Dubai Day 2: Stewart vs. Strydom
- Promotion: Bare Knuckle Fighting Championship
- Date: April 5, 2025
- Venue: Dubai Tennis Stadium
- City: Dubai, United Arab Emirates

BKFC 72 Dubai Day 2: Stewart vs. Strydom was a bare-knuckle fighting held by Bare Knuckle Fighting Championship on April 5, 2025.

=== Background ===
A BKFC Featherweight Championship bout between current champion Kai Stewart and undefeated contender Tommy Strydom headlined the event. An inaugural BKFC Women's Featherweight Championship bout between former WBA and IBO female super-welterweight boxing champion Hannah Rankin and Jessica Borga was the co-main event.

Former Bellator MMA fighter and former Geordie Shore reality show star Aaron Chalmers also made his debut against Chas Symonds.

=== Fight card ===
BKFC 72 Dubai Day 2: Stewart vs. Strydom
Weight Class				Method	Round	Time	Notes
Featherweight 66 kg	(United States) Kai Stewart	def.	(South Africa) Tommy Strydom	Decision (unanimous) (50-43, 50-43, 50-43)	5	2:00	For the BKFC Featherweight Championship.
W.Featherweight 66 kg	(United States) Jessica Borga	def.	(United Kingdom) Hannah Rankin	KO	1	0:32	For the inaugural BKFC Women's Featherweight Championship.
Featherweight 66 kg	(Spain) Nico Gaffie	def.	(United States) Brandon Allen	TKO	4	1:59	
Welterweight 75 kg	(Russia) Vlad Tuinov	def.	(Tunisia) Sabri Ben Henia	TKO (punches)	1	0:26	
Cruiserweight 93 kg	(United Kingdom) John Phillips	def.	(Brazil) Fábio Maldonado	KO (punch)	2	0:29	
Middleweight 79 kg	(United Kingdom) Aaron Chalmers	def.	(United Kingdom) Chas Symonds	TKO (left hook)	3	0:16	
Heavyweight 120 kg	(Iran) Hasan Yousefi	def.	(Brazil) Guto Inocente	Decision (unanimous) (50-45, 49-46, 50-45)	5	2:00	
Lightweight 70 kg	(Philippines) Mark Angel Sadang	def.	(Iran) Matin Safari	KO	1	1:27	
Featherweight 66 kg	(Kazakhstan) Dilshat Nurym	def.	(Russia) Shamil Dzhakhbarov	TKO	1	1:23	

== BKFC Fight Night Omaha: Cochrane vs. Edwards ==
BKFC Fight Night Omaha: Cochrane vs. Edwards
- Promotion: Bare Knuckle Fighting Championship
- Date: April 18, 2025
- Venue: The Astro
- City: Omaha, Nebraska

BKFC Fight Night Omaha: Cochrane vs. Edwards (also known as BKFC Fight Night 24) was a bare-knuckle fighting event held by Bare Knuckle Fighting Championship on April 18, 2025.

=== Background ===
A middleweight bout between Dakota Cochrane and Marcus Edwards headlined the event.

=== Fight card ===
BKFC Fight Night Omaha: Cochrane vs. Edwards
Weight Class				Method	Round	Time	Notes
Middleweight 79 kg	(United States) Marcus Edwards	def.	(United States) Dakota Cochrane	TKO	1	1:08	
Welterweight 75 kg	(United States) Bryce Henry	def.	(United States) Derrick Findley	TKO	2	1:40	
Middleweight 79 kg	(United States) Dionisio Ramirez	def.	(United States) Zebulin Vincent	TKO	1	1:58	
Lightweight 70 kg	(United States) James Brown	def.	(United States) Ramiro Figueroa	Decision (unanimous) (48-47, 48-47, 48-47)	5	2:00	
Middleweight 79 kg	(United States) Alonzo Martinez	def.	(United States) Kurtis Ellis	Decision (unanimous) (49-46, 49-46, 50-45)	5	2:00	
W.Strawweight 52 kg	(United States) Sarah Shell	def.	(Peru) Laddy Mejia	Decision (unanimous) (50-44, 50-44, 50-44)	5	2:00	
Middleweight 79 kg	(United States) Sean Wilson	def.	(United States) JorDan Christensen	Decision (unanimous) (49-46, 49-46, 50-45)	5	2:00	
Featherweight 66 kg	(United States) Traevon Kroger	def.	(United States) Jared Tallent	KO	2	1:20	
Featherweight 66 kg	(United States) Josh Krejci	def.	(United States) Austin Peterson	KO	1	1:30	

== BKFC 73 Italy: Camozzi vs. Bicchi ==
BKFC 73 Italy: Camozzi vs. Bicchi
- Promotion: Bare Knuckle Fighting Championship
- Date: April 26, 2025
- Venue: Palazzo Wanny
- City: Florence, Italy

BKFC 73 Italy: Camozzi vs. Bicchi (also known as BKFC on DAZN 5) was a bare-knuckle fighting event to be held by Bare Knuckle Fighting Championship on April 26, 2025.

=== Background ===
A BKFC Cruiserweight Championship rematch between current champion Chris Camozzi and Andrea Bicchi headlined the event. Camozzi was scheduled to face former champion (also former BKFC Light Heavyweight Champion) Lorenzo Hunt, but on April 12, it was announced that Hunt withdrew from the fight and was replaced by Andrea Bicchi.

=== Fight card ===
BKFC 73 Italy: Camozzi vs. Bicchi
Weight Class				Method	Round	Time	Notes
Cruiserweight 66 kg	(United States) Chris Camozzi	def.	(Italy) Andrea Bicchi	Decision (unanimous) (49-45, 49-45, 50-44)	5	2:00	For the BKFC Cruiserweight Championship.
Welterweight 75 kg	(England) Rico Franco	def.	(Republic of Ireland) Jimmy Sweeney	Decision (unanimous) (Sixth round: 10-9, 10-9, 10-9)	6	2:00	For the BKFC European Welterweight Championship.
Heavyweight 120 kg	(New Zealand) Haze Hepi	def.	(United States) Steven Banks	KO	1	1:36	
Cruiserweight 93 kg	(Italy) Ernesto Papa	def.	(Germany) Toni Estorer	KO	1	1:25	
Lightweight 70 kg	(United Kingdom) Navid Mansouri	def.	(Austria) Ruslan Tokhtarov	TKO	1	0:44	
Cruiserweight 93 kg	(Czech Republic) Jindřich Byrtus	def.	(Austria) Arbi Chakaev	KO	1	1:34	
Light Heavyweight 84 kg	(Slovakia) Tomáš Meliš	def.	(Spain) Jesus De Nazaret	KO	1	1:24	
W.Bantamweight 61 kg	(Germany) Nicole Schäfer	def.	(Serbia) Nadja Miljanević	Decision (split) (50-45, 48-47, 46-49)	5	2:00	
Cruiserweight 93 kg	(Italy) Walter Pugliesi	def.	(Czech Republic) Dominik Herold	Decision (unanimous) (47-46, 47-46, 47-46)	5	2:00	
Featherweight 66 kg	(Italy) Marco Guistarini	def.	(Bulgaria) Zdravko Dimitrov	Decision (unanimous) (50-45, 49-46, 48-47)	5	2:00	
Light Heavyweight 84 kg	(Czech Republic) Josef Hala	def.	(Italy) Giovanni Carpentieri	TKO	1	1:59	
Light Heavyweight 84 kg	(Italy) Enzo Tobbia	def.	(Czech Republic) Dominik Herold	Decision (unanimous) (47-46, 47-46, 47-46)	5	2:00	

== BKFC Fight Night Clearwater: Warren vs. Creer ==
BKFC Fight Night Clearwater: Warren vs. Creer
- Promotion: Bare Knuckle Fighting Championship
- Date: May 2, 2025
- Venue: OCC Road House & Museum
- City: Clearwater, Florida

BKFC Fight Night Clearwater: Warren vs. Creer (also known as BKFC Fight Night 25) was a bare-knuckle fighting held by Bare Knuckle Fighting Championship on May 2, 2025.

=== Background ===
A light heavyweight between Jared Warren and Joseph Creer headlined the event.

=== Fight card ===
BKFC Fight Night Clearwater: Warren vs. Creer
Weight Class				Method	Round	Time	Notes
Light Heavyweight 84 kg	(United States) Jared Warren	def.	(United States) Joseph Creer	TKO	1	1:32	
Bantamweight 61 kg	(United States) Ryan Reber	def.	(United States) Matt Guymon	Decision (majority) (47-47, 49-45, 48-46)	5	2:00	
Light Heavyweight 84 kg	(Dominican Republic) Jomi Escoboza	def.	(United States) Jay Jackson	TKO	3	2:00	
Bantamweight 61 kg	(United States) Michael Larrimore	def.	(United States) Samuel Samples	TKO	1	1:26	
Heavyweight 120 kg	(United States) Brady Meister	def.	(United States) Joseph White	TKO	2	1:16	
Featherweight 66 kg	(United States) Nathan Rivera	def.	(United States) Alex Castro	KO	4	1:00	
W.Bantamweight 61 kg	(United States) Crystal Pittman	vs.	(United States) Claudia Zamora	NC (accidental shot after a knockdown)	2	1:30	
Welterweight 75 kg	(United States) Rodney Hinton	def.	(United States) Ben Jacobsen	TKO	1	1:11	
Bantamweight 61 kg	(United States) Logan Speyrer	def.	(United States) Quentin Gaskins	Decision (unanimous) (49-46, 49-46, 49-46)	5	2:00	
Flyweight 57 kg	(United States) Anthony Yost	def.	(United States) Chachi Versace	Decision (unanimous) (50-45, 50-45, 49-46)	5	2:00	

== BKFC 74 Salt Lake City: Richman vs. Dyer ==
BKFC 74 Salt Lake City: Richman vs. Dyer
- Promotion: Bare Knuckle Fighting Championship
- Date: May 10, 2025
- Venue: Maverik Center
- City: West Valley City, Utah

BKFC 74 Salt Lake City: Richman vs. Dyer (also known as BKFC on DAZN 6) an upcoming bare-knuckle fighting event to be held by Bare Knuckle Fighting Championship on May 10, 2025.

=== Background ===
A BKFC Light Heavyweight Championship bout between current two-time champion Mike Richman and Josh Dyer is scheduled to headline the event.

=== Fight card ===
BKFC 74 Salt Lake City: Richman vs. Dyer
Weight Class				Method	Round	Time	Notes
Light Heavyweight 84 kg	(United States) Josh Dyer	def.	(United States) Mike Richman	TKO	4	0:58	For the BKFC Light Heavyweight Championship.
Heavyweight 120 kg	(United States) Ben Moa	def.	(United States) Bobby Brents	TKO	2	1:00	
Light Heavyweight 84 kg	(United States) Mike Jones	def.	(United States) Sean Hotusing	KO	2	1:28	
Light Heavyweight 84 kg	(United States) Shane Fichter	def.	(United States) Daniel Gardner	KO	1	1:59	
Light Heavyweight 84 kg	(United States) Zack Partridge	def.	(United States) Cody Beierle	KO	1	0:08	
Middleweight 79 kg	(United States) Josenaldo Silva	def.	(United States) Jordan Smith	KO	3	1:48	
Welterweight 75 kg	(United States) Dominico Salas	def.	(United States) Jeremiah Truhlar	Decision (unanimous) (49-46, 49-46, 50-45)	5	2:00	
W Strawweight 52 kg	(United States) Shelby Cannon	def.	(United States) Kathryn Paprocki	Decision (unanimous) (48-45, 48-45, 47-46)	5	2:00	
Cruiserweight 93 kg	(United States) Zac Cavender	def.	(United States) Erick Lozano	KO	1	1:03	
Lightweight 70 kg	(United States) Trever Bradshaw	def.	(United States) Deron Carlis	TKO	4	1:41	

== BKFC 75 Albuquerque: Mundell vs. Sanchez ==
BKFC 75 Albuquerque: Mundell vs. Sanchez
- Promotion: Bare Knuckle Fighting Championship
- Date: June 6, 2025
- Venue: Tingley Coliseum
- City: Albuquerque, New Mexico

BKFC 75 Albuquerque: Mundell vs. Sanchez was a bare-knuckle fighting event held by Bare Knuckle Fighting Championship on June 6, 2025.

=== Background ===
A BKFC Middleweight Championship bout between current champion David Mundell and Donald Sanchez headlined the event.

=== Bonus awards ===
The following fighters were awarded bonuses:

- Knockout of the Night: Bobby Henry
- Performance Bonuses: Murat Kilimetov and Skyler Mauller

=== Fight card ===
BKFC 75 Albuquerque: Mundell vs. Sanchez
Weight Class				Method	Round	Time	Notes
Middleweight 79 kg	(United States) David Mundell (c)	def.	(United States) Donald Sanchez	Decision (unanimous) (49-43, 49-43, 50-42)	5	2:00	For the BKFC Middleweight Championship.
Cruiserweight 93 kg	(Russia) Murat Kilimetov	def.	(United States) Leo Bercier	TKO	1	1:36	
Bantamweight 61 kg	(United States) Derek Perez	def.	(United States) Rick Caruso	TKO	3	1:56	
Welterweight 75 kg	(United States) Felipe Chavez	def.	(United States) Brandon Honsvick	Decision (unanimous)	5	2:00	
Light Heavyweight 84 kg	(United States) William Albrecht	def.	(United States) Kyle McElroy	TKO	2	2:00	
Middleweight 79 kg	(United States) Skyler Mauller	def.	(United States) Bryant McClain	KO	1	0:43	
Welterweight 75 kg	(United States) Bobby Henry	def.	(United States) Kasey Yates	KO	5	1:31	

== BKFC Fight Night Mohegan Sun: Porter vs. Cleckler ==
BKFC Fight Night Mohegan Sun: Porter vs. Cleckler
- Promotion: Bare Knuckle Fighting Championship
- Date: June 14, 2025
- Venue: Mohegan Sun Arena
- City: Uncasville, Connecticut

BKFC Fight Night Mohegan Sun: Porter vs. Cleckler (also known as BKFC Fight Night 26) was a bare-knuckle fighting event held by Bare Knuckle Fighting Championship on June 14, 2025.

=== Background ===
A heavyweight bout between Parker Porter and Dillon Cleckler headlined the event.

=== Fight card ===
BKFC Fight Night Mohegan Sun: Porter vs. Cleckler
Weight Class				Method	Round	Time	Notes
Heavyweight 120 kg	(United States) Parker Porter	def.	(United States) Dillon Cleckler	KO	1	1:08	
Heavyweight 120 kg	(United States) Josh Watson	def.	(Cape Verde) Yorgan De Castro	KO	1	1:53	
Middleweight 79 kg	(United States) JR Rumsley	def.	(United States) Brennan Ward	TKO	3	0:34	
Light Heavyweight 84 kg	(United States) Gary Balletto III	def.	(United States) Rodney Thomas	TKO	1	2:00	
Middleweight 79 kg	(United States) Pat Casey	def.	(United States) John Howard	TKO	1	2:00	
Welterweight 75 kg	(United States) Sergio Lopez	def.	(United States) Rick Hawn	TKO	3	0:30	
Bantamweight 61 kg	(United States) Lardy Navarro	def.	(United States) Anthony Foye	Decision (unanimous) (50-45, 50-45, 49-46)	5	2:00	
Featherweight 66 kg	(United States) Randy Costa	def.	(United States) Nick Burgos	KO	1	1:59	
Lightweight 70 kg	(United States) Peter Barrett	def.	(Canada) Nash Diederichs	KO	1	1:30	
Bantamweight 61 kg	(United States) Ishiah Carson	def.	(United States) Jared Lennon	TKO	1	0:15	
Light Heavyweight 84 kg	(United States) Joseph Peters	def.	(United States) Drew Nolan	TKO	1	1:46	

== BKFC 76 Texas: Bonner vs. Soto ==
BKFC 76 Texas: Bonner vs. Soto
- Promotion: Bare Knuckle Fighting Championship
- Date: June 21, 2025
- Venue: Dickies Arena
- City: Fort Worth, Texas

BKFC 76 Texas: Bonner vs. Soto (also known as BKFC on DAZN 7) was a bare-knuckle fighting event held by Bare Knuckle Fighting Championship on June 21, 2025.

=== Background ===
A lightweight bout between Ben Bonner and Tony Soto headlined the event. Former UFC Heavyweight Champion Andrei Arlovski was scheduled to make his debut at this event against Geronimo dos Santos. However, Santos withdrew for unknown reasons and was replaced by Josh Copeland.

=== Fight card ===
BKFC 76 Texas: Tenaglia vs. Soto
Weight Class				Method	Round	Time	Notes
Lightweight 70 kg	(United Kingdom) Ben Bonner	def.	(United States) Tony Soto	Decision (unanimous) (49-44, 47-46, 48-45)	5	2:00	For the Interim BKFC Lightweight Championship.
Heavyweight 120 kg	(United States) Andrei Arlovski	def.	(United States) Josh Copeland	TKO	4	2:00	
W.Flyweight 57 kg	(United States) Jessica Eye	def.	(Kazakhstan) Mariya Agapova	Decision (unanimous) (49-45, 49-45, 50-44)	5	2:00	
Heavyweight 120 kg	(United States) Kenzie Morrison	def.	(United States) Alex Davis	TKO	1	1:03	
Lightweight 70 kg	(United States) JC Deleon	def.	(United States) Ruben Warr	TKO	3	0:48	
Heavyweight 120 kg	(United States) Anthony Garrett	def.	(United States) Haze Wilson	TKO	1	1:36	
Welterweight 75 kg	(United States) Rodney Hilton	def.	(United States) Darren Whitney	Decision (unanimous) (47-46, 47-46, 47-46)	5	2:00	
Lightweight 70 kg	(United States) Jake Heffernan	def.	(United States) Paco Castillo	TKO	1	1:54	
Bantamweight 61 kg	(United States) Willie Gates	def.	(United States) Brandon Meneses	KO	1	1:24	
Preliminary Card
Middleweight 79 kg	(United States) Cameron Delano	def.	(United States) Jesse Desrosier	TKO	3	1:05	
Welterweight 75 kg	(United States) Jeremy Sauceda	def.	(United States) Israel Rodriguez	KO	1	1:03	
Light Heavyweight 84 kg	(United States) Roderick Stewart	def.	(United States) James Gray	Decision (unanimous) (30-26, 30-26, 29-27)	3	2:00	

== BKFC 77 Birmingham: Tierney vs. Christie ==
BKFC 77 Birmingham: Tierney vs. Christie
- Promotion: Bare Knuckle Fighting Championship
- Date: June 28, 2025
- Venue: bp pulse LIVE
- City: Birmingham, England

BKFC 77 Birmingham: Tierney vs. Christie (also known as BKFC UK 12) was a bare-knuckle fighting event held by Bare Knuckle Fighting Championship on June 28, 2025.

=== Background ===
A welterweight bout between Connor Tierney and Danny Christie headlined the event.

=== Fight card ===
BKFC 77 Birmingham: Tierney vs. Christie
Weight Class				Method	Round	Time	Notes
Welterweight 75 kg	(United Kingdom) Connor Tierney	def.	(United Kingdom) Danny Christie	TKO	4	0:14	
Light Heavyweight 84 kg	(South Africa) Charles Wasserman	def.	(United Kingdom) Jamie Cox	KO	2	0:40	
Light Heavyweight 84 kg	(United Kingdom) Matthew Wiwczarczyk	def.	(United Kingdom) Marley Churcher	Decision (unanimous) (50-45, 50-45, 50-45)	5	2:00	
Lightweight 70 kg	(United Kingdom) James Lilley	def.	(Spain) Fran Suarez	TKO	2	2:00	
Welterweight 75 kg	(United Kingdom) Jack Dugdale	def.	(United Kingdom) Frankie Gavin	KO	1	0:52	
Welterweight 75 kg	(United Kingdom) Tom Stokes	def.	(United Kingdom) Ryan Aston	KO	2	1:59	
Light Heavyweight 84 kg	(United Kingdom) Dawid Chylinski	def.	(United Kingdom) Jim Wallhead	KO	1	0:46	
Cruiserweight 93 kg	(United Kingdom) Mario Soo	def.	(United Kingdom) Ricky Nelder	TKO	3	1:22	
Featherweight 66 kg	(Netherlands) Jelle Zeegers	def.	(United Kingdom) Tony Bindon	TKO	2	1:54	
Middleweight 79 kg	(United Kingdom) Mac Bygraves	def.	(United Kingdom) George Thorpe	Decision (unanimous)	5	2:00	
Heavyweight 120 kg	(Poland) Krzysztof Wiśniewski	def.	(United Kingdom) Thai Tetley	KO	2	1:49	
Middleweight 79 kg	(United Kingdom) Kris Trezise	def.	(United Kingdom) Paul O'Sullivan	Decision (unanimous) (48-45, 47-46, 48-45)	5	2:00	
Heavyweight 120 kg	(United Kingdom) Liam Smyth	def.	(Poland) Rafał Witkowski	KO	4	1:56	

== BKFC 78 Hollywood, FL: Perdomo vs. Adams ==
BKFC 78 Hollywood, FL: Perdomo vs. Adams
- Promotion: Bare Knuckle Fighting Championship
- Date: July 12, 2025
- Venue: Seminole Hard Rock Hotel & Casino Hollywood
- City: Hollywood, Florida

BKFC 78 Hollywood, FL: Perdomo vs. Adams was a bare-knuckle fighting event held by Bare Knuckle Fighting Championship on July 12, 2025.

=== Background ===
A heavyweight bout between former two-time BKFC Heavyweight World Champion Arnold Adams and undefeated prospect Leonardo Perdomo headlined the event.

=== Bonus awards ===
The following fighters were awarded bonuses:

- Knockout of the Night: Esteban Rodriguez
- Performance of the Night: Christine Vicens

=== Fight card ===
BKFC Fight Night Hollywood, FL: Perdomo vs. Adams
Weight Class				Method	Round	Time	Notes
Heavyweight 120 kg	(Cuba) Leonardo Perdomo	def.	(United States) Arnold Adams	KO	1	1:26	
Flyweight 57 kg	(United States) Andrew Strode	def.	(Cuba) Gee Perez	TKO (doctor stoppage)	2	2:00	For the interim BKFC Flyweight Championship.
Lightweight 70 kg	(Cuba) Bryan Duran	vs.	(United States) Robbie Peralta	Draw (majority)	5	2:00	47-47, 47-47, 48-46
Bantamweight 61 kg	(United States) Justin Ibarrola	def.	(United States) Robert Armas	Decision (split)	5	2:00	48-47, 48-47, 47-48
Lightweight 70 kg	(United States) Howard Davis	def.	(United States) Drako Rodriguez	Decision (split)	5	2:00	49-46, 48-47, 47-48
Middleweight 79 kg	(United States) Francesco Ricchi	def.	(United States) Dallas Davison	KO	2	1:27	
W.Flyweight 57 kg	(United States) Christine Vicens	def.	(United States) Sarah Click	TKO	1	1:25	
Cruiserweight 93 kg	(United States) Stephen Townsel	def.	(United States) Keith Richardson	TKO	3	0:55	
Lightweight 70 kg	(Uruguay) Gaston Reyno	def.	(United States) Milton Volter	TKO	3	1:41	
Preliminary Card
Cruiserweight 93 kg	(United States) Esteban Rodriguez	def.	(Cuba) Julio Perez	KO	1	0:03	
Middleweight 79 kg	(United States) Jake Bostwick	def.	(United States) Leonel Carrera	TKO	1	0:53	
Bantamweight 61 kg	(United States) Matt Russo	def.	(United States) Justyn Martinez	KO	1	1:56	

== BKFC Fight Night Philly: Pague vs. Petersen ==
BKFC Fight Night Philly: Pague vs. Petersen
- Promotion: Bare Knuckle Fighting Championship
- Date: July 25, 2025
- Venue: 2300 Arena
- City: Philadelphia, Pennsylvania

BKFC Fight Night Philly: Pague vs. Petersen (also known as BKFC Fight Night 27) was a bare-knuckle fighting event held by Bare Knuckle Fighting Championship on July 25, 2025.

=== Background ===
A super heavyweight bout between Dustin Pague and Ryan Petersen headlined the event.

=== Fight card ===
BKFC Fight Night Philly: Pague vs. Petersen
Weight Class				Method	Round	Time	Notes
Welterweight 75 kg	(United States) Dustin Pague	vs.	(United States) Ryan Petersen	TKO	2	0:29	
W.Flyweight 57 kg	(United States) Rosalinda Rodriguez	vs.	(United States) Gabrielle Roman	TKO	3	1:08	
Middleweight 79 kg	(United States) John Garbarino	vs.	(United States) Erik Lopez	TKO	2	1:48	
Cruiserweight 93 kg	(Italy) Alessio Sakara	vs.	(United States) Erick Lozano	KO	2	0:48	
Welterweight 75 kg	(United States) Pat Sullivan	vs.	(United States) Austin Peterson	TKO	1	0:15	
Light Heavyweight 84 kg	(United States) Cody Vidal	vs.	(United States) Maurice Horne	KO	4	1:28	
Featherweight 66 kg	(United States) Elijah Harris	vs.	(United States) Ishiah Carson	KO	1	0:07	
Heavyweight 120 kg	(United States) Lex Ludlow	vs.	(United States) Lewis Rumsey	TKO	2	0:29	
Lightweight 70 kg	(United States) Dalvin Blair	vs.	(United States) Jason DiNunzio	TKO	1	1:23	

== BKFC 79 Sturgis: Gogo vs. Lane ==
BKFC 79 Sturgis: Gogo vs. Lane
- Promotion: Bare Knuckle Fighting Championship
- Date: August 2, 2025
- Venue: Buffalo Chip Campground
- City: Sturgis, South Dakota

BKFC 79 Sturgis: Gogo vs. Lane was a bare-knuckle fighting event held by Bare Knuckle Fighting Championship on August 2, 2025.

=== Background ===
A BKFC Welterweight Championship bout for the vacant title between undefeated contender Gorjan Slaveski and Julian Lane headlined the event.

=== Fight card ===
BKFC 79 Sturgis: Gogo vs. Lane
Weight Class				Method	Round	Time	Notes
Welterweight 75 kg	(United States) Julian Lane	def.	(North Macedonia) Gorjan Slaveski	Decision (unanimous) (49-44, 49-44, 49-45)	5	2:00	For the vacant BKFC Welterweight Championship.
W.Flyweight 57 kg	(United States) Taylor Starling	def.	(United States) Shelby Cannon	Decision (unanimous) (48-47, 48-47, 49-46)	5	2:00	
Light Heavyweight 84 kg	(United States) David Simpson	def.	(United States) Brandon Conley	TKO	1	0:27	
Lightweight 70 kg	(Puerto Rico) Elvin Brito	def.	(United States) Brandon Meyer	TKO	4	0:32	
W.Featherweight 66 kg	(United States) Shyanna Bintliff	def.	(United States) Marisol Ruelas	TKO	2	1:11	
Heavyweight 120 kg	(United States) Bear Hill	def.	(United States) Billy Swanson	KO	3	1:20	
Featherweight 66 kg	(United States) Traevon Kroger	def.	(United States) Daniel Pettit	TKO	1	2:00	
Preliminary Card
Featherweight 66 kg	(United States) Timmy Mason	def.	(United States) AJ Craig	TKO	1	2:00	
Cruiserweight 93 kg	(United Kingdom) Cody Kerr	def.	(United States) Dillon Blaydon	TKO	1	1:01	
Lightweight 70 kg	(Canada) Dan Godoy	def.	(United States) Ruben Arroyo	TKO	3	2:00	

== BKFC Fight Night Edmonton: Stuve vs. Santiago ==
BKFC Fight Night Edmonton: Stuve vs. Santiago
- Promotion: Bare Knuckle Fighting Championship
- Date: August 9, 2025
- Venue: River Cree Resort and Casino
- City: Enoch, Alberta, Canada

BKFC Fight Night Edmonton: Stuve vs. Santiago (also known as BKFC Fight Night 28) was a bare-knuckle fighting event held by Bare Knuckle Fighting Championship on August 9, 2025.

=== Background ===
A middleweight bout between Drew Stuve and Will Santiago headlined the event.

=== Fight card ===
BKFC Fight Night Edmonton: Stuve vs. Manno
Weight Class				Method	Round	Time	Notes
Middleweight 79 kg	(Canada) Drew Stuve	def.	(United States) Will Santiago	KO	1	1:37	
Lightweight 70 kg	(Canada) Chad Lucanas	def.	(Canada) Tim Tamaki	TKO	1	1:59	
Lightweight 70 kg	(Canada) Hasan Al-Ghanim	def.	(United States) Zach Pannell	TKO	1	0:22	
Heavyweight 120 kg	(Poland) Bohdan Kotok	def.	(United States) Brady Meister	KO	1	1:53	
Cruiserweight 93 kg	(United States) Joseph Creer	def.	(Canada) Kayden Giroux	TKO	4	2:00	
Welterweight 75 kg	(Canada) Kimani Crawford	def.	(Canada) Matthew Socholotiuk	Decision (unanimous) (48-46, 48-46, 50-44)	5	2:00	
W.Strawweight 52 kg	(Canada) Alexandra Delgado-Lopez	def.	(United States) Emma Murray	Decision (unanimous) (50-42, 50-42, 50-42)	5	2:00	
Welterweight 75 kg	(Canada) Caeden Scott	def.	(Canada) Justin Kennedy	TKO	1	1:26	
Lightweight 70 kg	(Canada) Nick Felber	def.	(Canada) James Dalzell	KO	1	0:36	
Middleweight 79 kg	(Canada) Adam De Freitas	def.	(United States) Skyler Mauller	KO	1	1:05	

== BKFC Fight Night Montenegro: Bakočević vs. Ott ==
BKFC Fight Night Montenegro: Bakočević vs. Ott
- Promotion: Bare Knuckle Fighting Championship
- Date: August 30, 2025
- Venue: Top Hill
- City: Budva, Montenegro

BKFC Fight Night Montenegro: Bakočević vs. Ott (also known as BKFC Fight Night 29) was a bare-knuckle fighting event held by Bare Knuckle Fighting Championship on August 30, 2025.

=== Background ===
This will mark the first BKFC event in Montenegro.

A welterweight bout between undefeated prospect Vaso Bakočević and Wilhelm Ott was scheduled to headline the event. However, a storm in the middle of the event halted the final two bouts of the evening which led to the cancelation of the bouts.

=== Fight card ===
BKFC Fight Night Montenegro: Bakočević vs. Ott
Weight Class				Method	Round	Time	Notes
Welterweight 75 kg	(Serbia) Vaso Bakočević	vs.	(Austria) Wilhelm Ott				Cancelled due to storm
Welterweight 75 kg	(Croatia) Petar Razov	vs.	(Slovenia) Bojan Kosednar				Cancelled due to storm
Heavyweight 120 kg	(Montenegro) Dilan Prasovic	def.	(Georgia (country)) Lasha Roinishvili	KO	1	1:08	
Heavyweight 120 kg	(Bosnia and Herzegovina) Stefan Dobrijević	def.	(Serbia) Dusa Radovic	KO	3	1:16	
Heavyweight 120 kg	(Germany) Tony Estorer	def.	(Bosnia and Herzegovina) Damjan Savanović	TKO	1	1:01	
W.Featherweight 66 kg	(Germany) Deborah Melhorn	def.	(Serbia) Nadja Milijancevic	Decision (unanimous) (48-47, 49-46, 48-47)	5	2:00	
Middleweight 79 kg	(Poland) Jedrzej Durski	def.	(Belgium) Donovan Desmae	Decision (unanimous)	5	2:00	
Featherweight 66 kg	(Germany) Issam Khaoui	def.	(Turkey) Ahmet Duman	Decision (unanimous)	5	2:00	
Light Heavyweight 84 kg	(Turkey) Emre Akbas	def.	(Germany) Gorichkhan Rigi	TKO	3	0:34	
Preliminary Card
Welterweight 75 kg	(Turkey) Emircan Gülşen	def.	(Slovakia) Denis Gondžala	TKO	2	1:34	
Middleweight 79 kg	(Montenegro) Alfred Koci	def.	(Montenegro) Kristijan Stevović	TKO	3	0:18	

== BKFC 80 Hollywood, FL: Perdomo vs. Adams 2 ==
BKFC 80 Hollywood, FL: Perdomo vs. Adams 2
- Promotion: Bare Knuckle Fighting Championship
- Date: September 12, 2025
- Venue: Seminole Hard Rock Hotel & Casino Hollywood
- City: Hollywood, Florida

BKFC 80 Hollywood, FL: Perdomo vs. Adams 2 was a bare-knuckle fighting event held by Bare Knuckle Fighting Championship on September 12, 2025.

=== Background ===
A heavyweight rematch between former two-time BKFC Heavyweight World Champion Arnold Adams and undefeated prospect Leonardo Perdomo headlined the event. They previously met at BKFC 78 in July where Perdomo won by knockout in the first round.

Kimbo Slice Jr. was scheduled to face Derek Perez in a featherweight bout, but the bout was cancelled for unknown reasons.

=== Bonus awards ===
The following fighters were awarded bonuses:

- Knockout of the Night: Jancarlos Rivera
- Performance of the Night: Leonardo Perdomo and Edgard Plazaola
- Balls of the Night: Gary Fox

=== Results ===
BKFC Fight Night Hollywood, FL: Perdomo vs. Adams 2
Weight Class				Method	Round	Time	Notes
Heavyweight 120 kg	(Cuba) Leonardo Perdomo	def.	(United States) Arnold Adams	KO	1	1:09	
Featherweight 66 kg	(United States) Edgard Plazaola	def.	(United Kingdom) Gary Fox	Decision (unanimous) (50-44, 50-44, 50-43)	5	2:00	
Heavyweight 120 kg	(Cuba) Yoel Romero	def.	(United States) Theo Doukas	TKO	2	1:56	
Light Heavyweight 84 kg	(United States) David Simpson	def.	(South Africa) Jeremy Smith	TKO	1	0:52	
Lightweight 70 kg	(United States) Bobby Henry	def.	(United States) Braeden Kuykendall	TKO	2	0:34	
Bantamweight 61 kg	(United States) Chris Garcia	def.	(United States) Austin Lewis	TKO	1	1:19	
Welterweight 75 kg	(Brazil) Paulo Games	def.	(United States) Wayna Reid	TKO	3	2:00	
Preliminary Card
Flyweight 57 kg	(United States) Jancarlos Rivera	def.	(United States) Vincent Alsept	KO	1	0:22	
Heavyweight 120 kg	(United States) Nicholas Blume	def.	(United States) Michael Furnier	TKO	1	0:55	
Light Heavyweight 84 kg	(United States) Rudy Levocz	def.	(United States) Justin Williams	Decision (unanimous) (30-26, 30-26, 29-27)	3	2:00	

== BKFC 81 Manchester: DeGale vs. Floyd ==
BKFC 81 Manchester: DeGale vs. Floyd
- Promotion: Bare Knuckle Fighting Championship
- Date: September 27, 2025
- Venue: AO Arena
- City: Manchester, England

BKFC 81 Manchester: DeGale vs. Floyd (also known as BKFC UK 13) was a bare-knuckle fighting event held by Bare Knuckle Fighting Championship on September 27, 2025.

=== Background ===
A light heavyweight bout between former IBF super-middleweight boxing champion (also 2008 Olympics amateur boxing gold medalist) James DeGale and Matt Floyd headlined the event. Both made their debuts with the promotion.

=== Fight card ===
BKFC 81 Manchester: DeGale vs. Floyd
Weight Class				Method	Round	Time	Notes
Light Heavyweight 84 kg	(United Kingdom) James DeGale	def.	(Australia) Matt Floyd	Decision (unanimous) (48-43, 48-43, 47-44)	5	2:00	
Light Heavyweight 84 kg	(United Kingdom) Aaron Chalmers	def.	(United Kingdom) Jack Fincham	TKO	2	2:00	
Lightweight 70 kg	(United Kingdom) Jonny Graham	def.	(United Kingdom) Navid Mansouri	KO	2	1:53	For the inaugural BKFC UK Lightweight Championship.
Featherweight 66 kg	(United Kingdom) Lewis Garside	def.	(United Kingdom) Jonno Chipchase	KO	1	1:10	
Light Heavyweight 84 kg	(United Kingdom) Dec Spelman	def.	(United Kingdom) Dawid Chylinski	KO	2	0:55	
Lightweight 70 kg	(Bulgaria) Jon Telfer	def.	(Poland) Bartlomiej Krol	KO	3	0:58	
Cruiserweight 93 kg	(Poland) David Oskar	def.	(United Kingdom) Travis Dickinson	TKO	1	0:53	
Light Heavyweight 84 kg	(United Kingdom) Sean Weir	def.	(United Kingdom) Joe Lister	TKO	2	1:25	
Middleweight 79 kg	(United Kingdom) Mikey Henderson	def.	(United Kingdom) Benjamin Lowe	Decision (unanimous) (48-46, 48-46, 49-47)	5	2:00	
Preliminary Card
Middleweight 79 kg	(United Kingdom) Gaz Corran	def.	(United Kingdom) Danny Moir	KO	1	1:45	
Bantamweight 61 kg	(United Kingdom) Keiron Sewell	def.	(Poland) Patryk Pietrasik	TKO	2	1:46	
Heavyweight 120 kg	(United Kingdom) Andy Thornton	def.	(United Kingdom) Matty Hil	KO	1	1:22	

== BKFC 82 Newark: Perry vs. Stephens ==
BKFC 82 Newark: Perry vs. Stephens
- Promotion: Bare Knuckle Fighting Championship
- Date: October 4, 2025
- Venue: Prudential Center
- City: Newark, New Jersey
- Attendance: 10,444

BKFC 82 Newark: Perry vs. Stephens (also known as BKFC on DAZN 8) was a bare-knuckle fighting event held by Bare Knuckle Fighting Championship on October 4, 2025.

=== Background ===
A welterweight bout for the King of Violence Championship between current champion Mike Perry and Jeremy Stephens headlined the event. This event was the first BKFC event in the state of New Jersey.

Former UFC Lightweight Champion Frankie Edgar was scheduled to make his BKFC debut against Jimmie Rivera. However, for undisclosed reasons, Edgar pulled out and was replaced by Timmy Mason.

Furthermore, a women's bantamweight bout for the inaugural symbolic "Queen of Violence Championship" between BKFC Women's Flyweight Champion Christine Ferea and BKFC Women's Featherweight Champion Jessica Borga served as the event's co-headliner.

=== Bonus awards ===
The following fighters were awarded bonuses:

- Fight of the Night: Mike Perry vs. Jeremy Stephens
- Knockout of the Night: Michael Trizano
- Performance of the Night: Christine Ferea, Oluwale Bamgbose, Quinten Gaskins, Jeff Lentz and Pat Carroll

=== Fight card ===
BKFC 82 Newark: Perry vs. Stephens
Weight Class				Method	Round	Time	Notes
Middleweight 79 kg	(United States) Mike Perry (c)	def.	(United States) Jeremy Stephens	TKO	5	1:35	For the symbolic King of Violence Championship.
W.Bantamweight 61 kg	(United States) Christine Ferea	def.	(United States) Jessica Borga	KO	4	0:26	For the symbolic Queen of Violence Championship.
Featherweight 66 kg	(United States) Jimmie Rivera	def.	(United States) Timmy Mason	TKO	3	0:20	
Cruiserweight 93 kg	(United States) Oluwale Bamgbose	def.	(Nigeria) Karl Roberson	TKO	2	0:58	
Lightweight 70 kg	(United States) Quentin Gaskins	def.	(United States) Phil Caracappa	KO	1	1:53	
Lightweight 70 kg	(United States) Jeff Lentz	def.	(United States) Elijah Harris	TKO	1	2:00	
Lightweight 70 kg	(United States) Michael Trizano	def.	(United States) JC Deleon	KO	1	0:20	
Preliminary Card
Heavyweight 120 kg	(United States) Pat Carroll	def.	(United States) Aleem Whitfield	KO	2	0:25	
Lightweight 70 kg	(Georgia (country)) Jmani Oliver	def.	(United States) Irakli Ghvinjilia	Decision (unanimous) (48-45, 48-44, 47-45)	5	2:00	
Featherweight 66 kg	(United States) Justin Clarke	def.	(United States) Ishiah Carson	Decision (unanimous) (50-43, 50-43, 50-43)	5	2:00	

== BKFC Fight Night Hammond: Henry vs. Stewart ==
BKFC Fight Night Hammond: Henry vs. Stewart
- Promotion: Bare Knuckle Fighting Championship
- Date: October 18, 2025
- Venue: Horseshoe Hammond
- City: Hammond, Indiana

BKFC Fight Night Hammond: Henry vs. Stewart (also known as BKFC Fight Night 30) is an upcoming bare-knuckle fighting event to be held by Bare Knuckle Fighting Championship on October 18, 2025.

=== Background ===
A welterweight bout between Bryce Henry and Jake Lindsey was set to headline the event. However, for unknown reasons, Lindsey was replaced by Roderick Stewart.

=== Fight card ===
BKFC Fight Night Hammond: Henry vs. Lindsey
Weight Class				Method	Round	Time	Notes
Welterweight 75 kg	(United States) Bryce Henry	def.	(United States) Roderick Stewart	KO	2	1:59	
Middleweight 79 kg	(United States) Cameron VanCamp	def.	(United States) Derrick Findley	TKO	2	0:35	
Flyweight 57 kg	(United States) Nate Maness	def.	(United States) Tyler Randall	KO	2	0:45	
Bantamweight 61 kg	(United States) Ronny Houser	def.	(United States) Julian Valencia	TKO	1	0:15	
Heavyweight 120 kg	(United States) Gabriel Mota	def.	(United States) Sean Schultz	Decision (unanimous) (49-46, 49-46, 50-45)	5	2:00	
W.Flyweight 57 kg	(United States) Brooke Evans	def.	(United States) Marisol Ruelas	Decision (split) (47-48, 48-47, 49-46)	5	2:00	
Light Heavyweight 84 kg	(United States) Thomas Angeloff	def.	(United States) Travis Smith	TKO	2	1:48	
Flyweight 57 kg	(United States) Octavin Turner	def.	(United States) Cary Caprio	Decision (unanimous) (30-27, 30-26, 29-26)	5	2:00	
Welterweight 75 kg	(United States) Darren Whitney	def.	(United States) Adam Brady	TKO	1	0:18	

== BKFC 83 Italy: Camozzi vs. Sakara ==
BKFC 83 Italy: Camozzi vs. Sakara
- Promotion: Bare Knuckle Fighting Championship
- Date: October 25, 2025
- Venue: Palazzetto dello Sport
- City: Rome, Italy

BKFC 83 Italy: Camozzi vs. Sakara was a bare-knuckle fighting event held by Bare Knuckle Fighting Championship on October 25, 2025.

=== Background ===
A BKFC Cruiserweight Championship bout between current champion Chris Camozzi and Alessio Sakara headlined the event.

=== Fight card ===
BKFC 83 Italy: Camozzi vs. Sakara
Weight Class				Method	Round	Time	Notes
Cruiserweight 93 kg	(Italy) Alessio Sakara	def.	(United States) Chris Camozzi	Decision (split) (48-47, 47-48, 48-47)	5	2:00	For the BKFC Cruiserweight Championship.
Lightweight 70 kg	(Argentina) Franco Tenaglia	def.	(United Kingdom) Ben Bonner	Decision (split) (48-47, 48-47, 47-48)	5	2:00	Wins the BKFC World Lightweight Championship Semifinal.
Middleweight 79 kg	(Czech Republic) Josef Hala	def.	(Italy) Francesco Ricchi	TKO	3	1:43	For the inaugural BKFC European Middleweight Championship.
Featherweight 66 kg	(Spain) Nico Gaffie	vs.	(Netherlands) Jelle Zeegers	KO	1	1:13	For the inaugural BKFC European Featherweight Championship.
Welterweight 75 kg	(United States) Carlos Trinidad	def.	(Republic of Ireland) Jimmy Sweeney	TKO	3	0:18	
Featherweight 66 kg	(United States) James Brown	def.	(United Kingdom) Dan Chapman	TKO	4	2:00	
Cruiserweight 93 kg	(Italy) Walter Pugliesi	def.	(United Kingdom) Karl Thompson	KO	1	1:51	
Heavyweight 120 kg	(Poland) Krzysztof Wiśniewski	def.	(Australia) Haze Hepi	TKO	3	2:00	
Light Heavyweight 84 kg	(Slovakia) Tomáš Meliš	vs.	(Italy) Andrea Bicchi	KO	1	1:59	
Preliminary Card
Cruiserweight 93 kg	(Italy) Ernesto Papa	def.	(Netherlands) Fred Sikking	TKO	1	0:53	
Middleweight 79 kg	(Italy) Ouadia Tergui	def.	(Italy) Enzo Tobbia	TKO	3	1:12	

== BKFC Fight Night Michigan: Rodriguez vs. Cavender ==
BKFC Fight Night Michigan: Rodriguez vs. Cavender
- Promotion: Bare Knuckle Fighting Championship
- Date: November 1, 2025
- Venue: Soaring Eagle Casino
- City: Mount Pleasant, Michigan

BKFC Fight Night Michigan: Rodriguez vs. Cavender (also known as BKFC Fight Night 31) was a bare-knuckle fighting event held by Bare Knuckle Fighting Championship on November 1, 2025.

=== Background ===
A cruiserweight bout between Esteban Rodriguez and Zac Cavender is scheduled to headline the event.

=== Fight card ===
BKFC Fight Night Michigan: Rodriguez vs. Cavender
Weight Class				Method	Round	Time	Notes
Cruiserweight 93 kg	(United States) Esteban Rodriguez	def.	(United States) Zac Cavender	TKO	1	1:10	
Featherweight 66 kg	(United States) Nathan Rivera	def.	(South Africa) Tommy Strydom	TKO	3	0:34	
Light Heavyweight 84 kg	(United States) Joseph Creer	def.	(Canada) Taylor Bull	TKO	2	1:47	
Light Heavyweight 84 kg	(United States) Erick Lozano	def.	(United States) Tylor Sijohn	Decision (unanimous) (50-40, 50-40, 48-42)	5	2:00	
Bantamweight 61 kg	(United States) Justin Street	def.	(United States) AJ Craig	Decision (unanimous) (50-45, 50-45, 49-46)	5	2:00	
Featherweight 66 kg	(United States) Michael Hernandez	def.	(United States) Antonio Castillo Jr.	TKO	2	1:15	
Light Heavyweight 84 kg	(United States) David Sanchez	def.	(United States) Terryl Johnson	TKO	2	1:19	
Light Heavyweight 84 kg	(Russia) Oleg Magkeev	def.	(United States) Eric Westbury	TKO	2	0:13	
Welterweight 75 kg	(United States) Casey Moses	def.	(United States) Paul Schiller	KO	1	0:57	
Preliminary Card
Cruiserweight 93 kg	(United States) Aubrey Mendonca	def.	(United States) Junior Hicks	KO	1	0:22	
Lightweight 70 kg	(United States) Paris Boyd	def.	(United States) Ruben Arroyo	TKO	1	0:31	

== BKFC 84 Palm Desert: Dyer vs. Hunt 2 ==
BKFC 84 Palm Desert: Dyer vs. Hunt 2
- Promotion: Bare Knuckle Fighting Championship
- Date: November 15, 2025
- Venue: Acrisure Arena
- City: Thousand Palms, California

BKFC 84 Palm Desert: Dyer vs. Hunt 2 was a bare-knuckle fighting event held by Bare Knuckle Fighting Championship on November 15, 2025.

=== Background ===
A BKFC Light Heavyweight Championship bout between current champion Josh Dyer and current BKFC Middleweight Champion champion David Mundell headlined the event. Mundell was planning on moving up one division to challenge for a second championship. However, for unknown reasons, Mundell was replaced by former BKFC Cruiserweight and BKFC Light Heavyweight World Champion Lorenzo Hunt. They last fought at BKFC 17 in April 2021 when Hunt won by technical knockout as a result of a corner stoppage.

=== Fight card ===
BKFC 84 Palm Desert: Dyer vs. Hunt 2
Weight Class				Method	Round	Time	Notes
Light Heavyweight 84 kg	(United States) Lorenzo Hunt	def.	(United States) Josh Dyer (c)	KO	1	1:59	For the BKFC Light Heavyweight Championship.
Middleweight 79 kg	(Canada) Drew Stuve	def.	(United States) Zeb Vincent	Decision (unanimous) (49-46, 49-46, 48-47)	5	2:00	
W.Featherweight 66 kg	(United States) Aspen Ladd	def.	(United States) Shyanna Bintliff	KO	1	1:59	
Light Heavyweight 84 kg	(United States) Cody Vidal	def.	(United States) David Simpson	KO	5	0:43	
Welterweight 75 kg	(Brazil) Paulo Games	def.	(Russia) Evgeny Kurdanov	RTD	3	2:00	
Bantamweight 61 kg	(United States) David Diaz	def.	(United States) Justyn Martinez	TKO	3	1:58	
Welterweight 75 kg	(Mongolia) Enkhtur Bayartsogt	def.	(United States) Ryan Petersen	TKO	1	0:22	
Preliminary Card
Heavyweight 120 kg	(United States) Juan Figuerva	def.	(United States) Caleb Joseph Avila	TKO	1	1:55	
Cruiserweight 93 kg	(United States) Iman Williams	def.	(United States) Lewis Glover	TKO	2	1:35	

== BKFC 85 Hollywood, FL: Trout vs. Palomino 2 ==
BKFC 86 Hollywood, FL: Trout vs. Palomino 2
- Promotion: Bare Knuckle Fighting Championship
- Date: December 5, 2025
- Venue: Seminole Hard Rock Hotel & Casino Hollywood
- City: Hollywood, Florida

BKFC 85 Hollywood, FL: Trout vs. Palomino 2 was a bare-knuckle fighting event held by Bare Knuckle Fighting Championship on December 5 2025.

=== Background ===
A lightweight bout between former BKFC Welterweight Champion Austin Trout and former BKFC Lightweight and Welterweight Champion Luis Palomino headlined the event in the BKFC World Lightweight Title Tournament Semifinal. The two previously met in February 2024 at BKFC 57, where Palomino suffered his first bare-knuckle loss. A BKFC Bantamweight Championship bout for the vacant title between Justin Ibarrola and Ryan Reber took place. Alberto Blas vacated his title due to lack of competition.

=== Fight card ===
BKFC 85 Hollywood, FL: Trout vs. Palomino 2
Weight Class				Method	Round	Time	Notes
Lightweight 70 kg	(United States) Austin Trout	def.	(Peru) Luis Palomino	TKO (doctor stoppage)	3	2:00	
Bantamweight 61 kg	(United States) Justin Ibarrola	def.	(United States) Ryan Reber	KO	3	1:21	For the vacant BKFC Bantamweight Championship.
Heavyweight 120 kg	(Cuba) Leonardo Perdomo	def.	(United States) Corey Willis	KO	3	1:33	
W.Flyweight 57 kg	(United States) Christine Vicens	def.	(Brazil) Carina Damm	TKO	1	1:09	
Welterweight 75 kg	(North Macedonia) Gorjan Slaveski	def.	(United States) Ja'Far Fortt	TKO	1	1:34	
Cruiserweight 93 kg	(United States) Stephen Townsel	def.	(United States) Julio Perez Rodriguez	TKO	2	0:39	
Lightweight 70 kg	(United States) Ramiro Figueroa	def.	(United States) Howard Davis	TKO	2	2:00	
Flyweight 57 kg	(United States) Gee Perez	def.	(United States) Chancey Wilson	TKO	4	1:46	
Lightweight 70 kg	(Uruguay) Gaston Reyno	def.	(United States) Dusty Sparks	TKO	2	0:32	
Preliminary Card
Bantamweight 61 kg	(United States) Matt "Rambo" Russo	def.	(United States) Samuel Samples	KO	2	0:33	
Welterweight 75 kg	(United States) Peter Peraza	def.	(United States) Joshuah "Famez" Alvarez	TKO	1	1:16	
Bantamweight 61 kg	(United States) Ernesto Suarez	def.	(United States) Angelo Colon	TKO	1	1:24	

== BKFC Fight Night Derby: Cooke vs. Holmes ==
BKFC Fight Night Derby: Cooke vs. Holmes
- Promotion: Bare Knuckle Fighting Championship
- Date: December 13, 2025
- Venue: Vaillant Live
- City: Derby, England

BKFC Fight Night Derby: Cooke vs. Holmes (also known as BKFC Fight Night 32 and BKFC UK 14) was a bare-knuckle fighting event that was held by Bare Knuckle Fighting Championship on December 13, 2025.

=== Background ===
A light heavyweight bout for the vacant BKFC UK Light Heavyweight Championship between Conor Cooke and Anthony Holmes headlined the event.

=== Fight card ===
BKFC Fight Night Derby: Cooke vs. Holmes
Weight Class				Method	Round	Time	Notes
Light Heavyweight 84 kg	(United Kingdom) Conor Cooke	def.	(United Kingdom) Anthony Holmes	TKO	3	2:00	For the vacant BKFC UK Light Heavyweight Championship.
Bantamweight 61 kg	(United Kingdom) Bradley Taylor	def.	(United Kingdom) Brian Hyslop	Decision (unanimous)	5	2:00	49-46, 49-46, 48-47
Welterweight 75 kg	(United Kingdom) Paul Cook	vs.	(United Kingdom) Matthew Wiwczaryk	Draw (majority)	5	2:00	47-47, 47-47, 46-48
Featherweight 66 kg	(United Kingdom) Lewis Knox	def.	(United Kingdom) Robbie Brown	KO	4	0:41	
Middleweight 79 kg	(United Kingdom) Simeon Otley	def.	(Poland) Oskar Smykiel	Decision (unanimous)	5	2:00	49-46, 49-46, 50-46
Middleweight 79 kg	(United Kingdom) Liam Hutchinson	def.	(United Kingdom) Luke Brassfield	TKO	5	1:44	
Middleweight 79 kg	(United Kingdom) Leigh Cohoon	def.	(United Kingdom) Cory Hardy	KO	3	1:39	
Lightweight 70 kg	(United Kingdom) Tommy Hawthorn	def.	(United Kingdom) Tommy Carus	TKO	2	1:21	
Light Heavyweight 84 kg	(United Kingdom) Ricky Nelder	def.	(United Kingdom) Danny Leadbetter	TKO	4	1:47	
Preliminary Card
W.Featherweight 66 kg	(United Kingdom) Terri Diamond	vs.	(United Kingdom) Meghan O'Neill	KO	1	1:44	
Lightweight 70 kg	(United Kingdom) Luke Steele	def.	(United Kingdom) Will Smith	KO	2	0:26	

== BKFC Fight Night Mohegan Sun: Porter vs. Garrett ==
BKFC Fight Night Mohegan Sun: Porter vs. Garrett
- Promotion: Bare Knuckle Fighting Championship
- Date: December 20, 2025
- Venue: Mohegan Sun Arena
- City: Uncasville, Connecticut

BKFC Fight Night Mohegan Sun: Porter vs. Garrett (also known as BKFC Fight Night 33) was a bare-knuckle fighting event held by Bare Knuckle Fighting Championship on December 20, 2025.

=== Background ===
A heavyweight bout between Parker Porter and Anthony Garrett headlined the event.

=== Fight card ===
BKFC Fight Night Mohegan Sun: Porter vs. Copeland
Weight Class				Method	Round	Time	Notes
Heavyweight 120 kg	(United States) Parker Porter	def.	(United States) Anthony Garrett	KO	2	0:42	
Middleweight 79 kg	(United States) Pat Casey	def.	(United States) David Sanchez	TKO	1	1:47	
Lightweight 70 kg	(United States) Peter Barrett	def.	(United States) Anthony Pike	Decision (split)	5	2:00	49-46, 47-48, 48-47
Middleweight 79 kg	(United States) Gary Balletto III	def.	(United States) Skyler Mauller	KO	2	0:29	
Bantamweight 61 kg	(United States) Lardy Navarro	def.	(United States) Anthony Sanchez	Decision (split)	5	2:00	48-47, 47-49, 49-46
W.Strawweight 52 kg	(United States) Gabrielle Roman	def.	(South Africa) Crystal Van Wyk	TKO (doctor stoppage)	1	2:00	
Lightweight 70 kg	(United States) Rico DiSciullo	def.	(United States) Stash Kuykendall	KO	1	0:41	
Preliminary Card
Heavyweight 120 kg	(Brazil) Guilherme Viana	def.	(United States) Aleem Whitfield	KO	2	1:59	
Light Heavyweight 84 kg	(United States) Joseph Peters	def.	(United States) David Burke	TKO (doctor stoppage)	1	2:00	
Lightweight 70 kg	(United States) Ashton Caniglia	def.	(United States) Travis Demko	DQ (repeated eye pokes)	4	0:34	
