= Christine Ferea =

American boxer (born 1982)

- Born: September 10, 1982 (age 44); San Jose, California, United States
- Other names: Misfit
- Height: 5 ft 5 in (1.65 m)
- Weight: 125 lb (57 kg)
- Division: Featherweight (125 lb)
- Reach: 66 in (168 cm)
- Style: Brazilian Jiu Jitsu, Kickboxing, Muay Thai, Boxing
- Fighting out of: Las Vegas, Nevada, United States
- Team: MISFIT
- Years active: 2012–present

Kickboxing record
- Total: 13
- Wins: 13
- Losses: 0

Mixed martial arts record
- Total: 3
- Wins: 1
- By knockout: 1
- Losses: 2
- By decision: 2

Amateur record
- Total: 4
- Wins: 4
- By knockout: 4
- Losses: 0

Other information
- Occupation: Professional Bare Knuckle Boxer {BKFC}
- Mixed martial arts record from Sherdog

Christine Ferea (born September 10, 1982) is an American bare-knuckle boxer who competes in the flyweight division of the Bare Knuckle Fighting Championship (BKFC), where she is the current BKFC Flyweight Champion.

== Background ==
Ferea was born in San Jose, California, United States. Growing up as a troubled kid, she fought in many street fights. She signed up at a gym in the hope to get fit, and after she was humbled by many fighters there, she started Muay Thai training. She found her way to BKFC in 2018, where she is currently the #1 ranked woman in the world at 125lbs. Ferea's moniker "Misfit", is tattooed on her left shin.

== Mixed martial arts career ==
=== Early career ===
Ferea amassed a record of 13–0 in amateur Muay Thai, and 1-0 professionally. She later transitioned to MMA.

Ferea amassed a record of 3–0 in amateur mixed martial arts career from 2012 to 2015, fighting under King of the Cage (KOTC), Tuff-N-Uff, and Dragon House, prior to being signed by Invicta.

=== Invicta Fighting Championships ===
Ferea made her Invicta debut on January 14, 2017, against Rachael Ostovich at Invicta FC 21: Anderson vs. Tweet. She won the fight via technical knock-out on round three.

Her next fight came on May 20, 2017, facing Tiffany van Soest at Invicta FC 23: Porto vs. Niedźwiedź. She lost the fight via unanimous decision.

On December 8, 2017, Ferea faced Karina Rodríguez at Invicta FC 26: Maia vs. Niedwiedz. She lost the fight via unanimous decision.

== Bare Knuckle Fighting Championship ==
Ferea made her debut at BKFC 3 on October 20, 2018 against Jennifer Tate and won by technical knockout in the first round.

On April 6, 2019, Ferea faced Britain Hart at BKFC 5 and won the Police Gazette Women's Featherweight American Championship by technical knockout as a result of a doctor stoppage.

On August 10, 2019, Ferea lost the championship at BKFC 7 against Helen Peralta by unanimous decision.

On September 10, 2020 at BKFC 12, Ferea faced Calie Cutler and won the bout in the second round by technical knockout.

On October 9, 2021 at BKFC Fight Night 1, Ferea faced Calista Silgado and won by knockout in the third round.

On February 19, 2022, Ferea defeated Britain Hart to win the inaugural BKFC women’s flyweight title in the rematch at BKFC KnuckleMania 2.

On August 27, 2022, in her first title defense at BKFC 28, Ferea faced Taylor Starling and won by technical knockout in the first round.

On April 29, 2023, Ferea made her second title defense at BKFC 41 against Bec Rawlings and won by technical knockout via doctor stoppage at the end of the second round.

On December 2, 2023, Ferea made her third title defense at BKFC 56 in a rematch against Bec Rawlings where she won by unanimous decision.

Ferea was scheduled to fight former WBO female featherweight boxing champion Heather Hardy in the main event of BKFC 61 in a bantamweight bout on May 11, 2024. However, due to Hardy's health issues, the bout was scrapped.

Ferea made her fourth title defense against Jade Masson-Wong on September 6, 2024 at BKFC 65. Ferea won the fight by split decision with the scores being 49-46, 49-46, 46-49.

Ferea made her fifth defense of her BKFC Women's Flyweight Championship against Christine Vicens at BKFC on DAZN 3 on December 21, 2024. She won the fight by technical knockout as a result of a doctor stoppage in the fourth round. This fight earned her a Fight of the Night award.

Ferea faced Jessica Borga for the inaugural "Queen of Violence Championship" title in a bantamweight bout at BKFC 82, taking place at the Prudential Center in Newark, NJ, on October 4, 2025. She won the fight by technical knockout in the fourth round. This fight earned her a Performance of the Night award.

Fera defended her "Queen of Violence" title against Sofia Landi in a women's bantamweight bout on August 29, 2026 at BKFC 92. She won the fight by knockout in the second round.

== Championships and accomplishments ==
=== Bare-knuckle boxing ===
- Bare Knuckle Fighting Championship
  - BKFC Women's Flyweight Championship (First, One time, Current)
    - Five successful title defenses
  - BKFC Queen of Violence Championship (Inaugural, First, Current)
    - One successful title defense
  - Fight of the Night (One time) vs. Christine Vicens
  - Performance of the Night (One time) vs. Jessica Borga
  - BKFC 2023 Female Fighter of the Year

== Mixed martial arts record ==
Professional record breakdown
3 matches	1 win	2 losses
By knockout	1	0
By decision	0	2

Res.	Record	Opponent	Method	Event	Date	Round	Time	Location	Notes
Loss	1–2	Karina Rodríguez	Decision (unanimous)	Invicta FC 26: Maia vs. Niedwiedz	December 8, 2017	3	5:00	Kansas City, Missouri, United States	Return to Flyweight.
Loss	1–1	Tiffany van Soest	Decision (unanimous)	Invicta FC 23: Porto vs. Niedźwiedź	May 20, 2017	3	5:00	Kansas City, Missouri, United States	Strawweight debut.
Win	1–0	Rachael Ostovich	TKO (head kick and punches)	Invicta FC 21: Anderson vs. Tweet	January 14, 2017	3	1:29	Kansas City, Missouri, United States	Flyweight debut.

== Bare knuckle boxing record ==
Professional record breakdown
13 matches	12 wins	1 loss
By knockout	9	0
By decision	3	1

Res.	Record	Opponent	Method	Event	Date	Round	Time	Location	Notes
Win	12–1	Sofia Landi	KO (punches)	BKFC 92	August 29, 2026	2	0:33	Boston, Massachusetts, United States	Defended the symbolic Queen of Violence Championship.
Win	11–1	Jessica Borga	KO (punch)	BKFC 82	October 4, 2025	4	0:26	Newark, New Jersey, United States	Bantamweight debut. Won the symbolic Queen of Violence Championship. Performance of the Night.
Win	10–1	Christine Vicens	TKO (doctor stoppage)	BKFC on DAZN Hollywood, FL: Warren vs. Richman	December 21, 2024	4	1:22	Hollywood, Florida, United States	Defended the BKFC Women's Flyweight Championship. Fight of the Night.
Win	9–1	Jade Masson-Wong	Decision (split)	BKFC 65	September 6, 2024	5	2:00	Salt Lake City, Utah, United States	Defended the BKFC Women's Flyweight Championship.
Win	8–1	Bec Rawlings	Decision (unanimous)	BKFC 56	December 2, 2023	5	2:00	Salt Lake City, Utah, United States	Defended the BKFC Women's Flyweight Championship.
Win	7–1	Bec Rawlings	TKO (doctor stoppage)	BKFC 41	April 29, 2023	2	2:00	Broomfield, Colorado, United States	Defended the BKFC Women's Flyweight Championship.
Win	6–1	Taylor Starling	TKO (retirement)	BKFC 28	August 27, 2022	1	0:47	Rio Rancho, New Mexico, United States	Defended the BKFC Women's Flyweight Championship.
Win	5–1	Britain Hart	Decision (unanimous)	BKFC KnuckleMania 2	February 19, 2022	5	2:00	Hollywood, Florida, United States	Won the inaugural BKFC Women's Flyweight Championship.
Win	4–1	Calista Silgado	KO (punches)	BKFC Fight Night Montana: Riggs vs. Guillard	October 9, 2021	3	1:34	Billings, Montana, United States	
Win	3–1	Calie Cutler	TKO (strikes)	BKFC 12	September 11, 2020	2	1:27	Daytona Beach, Florida, United States	
Loss	2–1	Helen Peralta	Decision (unanimous)	BKFC 7	August 10, 2019	5	2:00	Biloxi, Mississippi, United States	Lost the Police Gazette Women's Featherweight American Championship.
Win	2–0	Britain Hart	TKO (doctor stoppage)	BKFC 5	April 6, 2019	2	1:09	Biloxi, Mississippi, United States	Won the vacant Police Gazette Women's Featherweight American Championship.
Win	1–0	Jennifer Tate	TKO (punches)	BKFC 3	October 20, 2018	1	1:55	Biloxi, Mississippi, United States	
