= Jessica Borga =

American bare-knuckle boxer and mixed martial artist (born 1989)

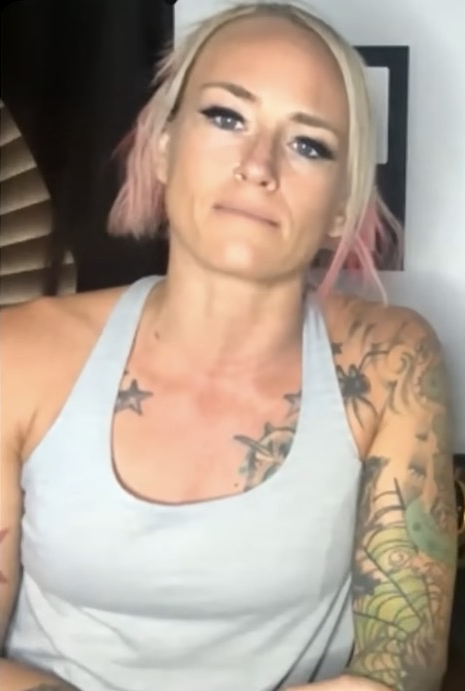
- In a 2025 interview
- Born: December 18, 1989 (age 36); Lakeland, Florida, United States
- Other names: The Black Widow
- Height: 5 ft 7 in (1.70 m)
- Weight: 136 lb (62 kg; 9.7 st)
- Division: Featherweight (2018-present); Bantamweight (2025)
- Reach: Brazilian jiu-jitsu
- Fighting out of: Lakeland, Florida, United States
- Team: Champions Mixed Martial Arts
- Years active: 2022–present (bare-knuckle boxing); 2018-2021 (MMA)

Mixed martial arts record
- Total: 7
- Wins: 3
- By knockout: 2
- By submission: 1
- Losses: 4
- By knockout: 2
- By decision: 2

Bare-knuckle boxing record
- Total: 4
- Wins: 3
- By knockout: 2
- Losses: 1

Other information
- Mixed martial arts record from Sherdog

Jessica Borga (born December 18, 1989) is an American bare-knuckle boxer and mixed martial artist. She currently competes in the Bare Knuckle Fighting Championship in the women's featherweight division, where she is the current and inaugural BKFC Women's Featherweight Champion. As a mixed martial artist, she most notably competed in Bellator MMA.

== Background ==
Borga was born in Lakeland, Florida, United States. Her father worked as a police officer. When she was young, her brother had been killed in a car accident. She had gotten into fights in school, often defending those who were unable to defend themselves. After her father's death, Borga discovered a gym called Champions Mixed Martial Arts and signed up with it. After a month of training, she became pregnant and subsequently had her first son before resuming training a few years later.

== Mixed martial arts career ==
Borga competed in amateur MMA from 2015 to 2017 and posted a 6-4 record. She made her professional MMA career against Premier FC 25 on March 10, 2018, at Premier FC 25, winning the bout by TKO. She then won two more bouts and lost one, also all by TKO.

Borga faced Amber Leibrock on September 7, 2019, at Bellator 226. She won the bout via first round armbar submission.

Borga was scheduled to face Marina Mokhnatkina on December 10, 2020 at Bellator 254. The bout was cancelled for unknown reasons.

Borga faced Talita Nogueira on April 9, 2021 at Bellator 256. She lost the bout via a unanimous decision, even with Nogueira's one point deduction in the second round due to an illegal blow to the back of Borga's head.

Borga faced Leah McCourt on 1 October 2021 at Bellator 267. She lost the one-sided bout via unanimous decision.

== Bare-knuckle boxing career ==
Making her bare-knuckle boxing and BKFC debut, Borga was scheduled to face Brooke Gilley on November 5, 2022, at BKFC 32. However, Gilley withdrew from the bout and was replaced by Sarah Click. Borga won the bout by knockout in the first round.

Borga faced Katharina Lehner on April 12, 2024 at BKFC Fight Night 13. She won the bout by knockout in the first round.

Borga faced Hannah Rankin for the inaugural BKFC Women's Featherweight Championship at BKFC 72 Dubai: Day 2 on April 5, 2025 at the Dubai Tennis Stadium in Dubai, UAE. She won the fight by knockout in the first round to become the inaugural champion.

Borga faced Christine Ferea for the inaugural "Queen of Violence" title in a bantamweight bout at BKFC 82 on October 4, 2025, at the Prudential Center in Newark, New Jersey. She lost the fight by technical knockout in the fourth round.

== Personal life ==
Borga is married and has three children.

== Championships and accomplishments ==
- Bare Knuckle Fighting Championship
  - BKFC Women's Featherweight Championship (One time, current, inaugural)

== Mixed martial arts record ==
Professional record breakdown
7 matches	3 wins	4 losses
By knockout	2	2
By submission	1	0
By decision	0	2

Res.	Record	Opponent	Method	Event	Date	Round	Time	Location	Notes
Loss	3–4	Leah McCourt	Decision (unanimous)	Bellator 267	October 1, 2021	3	5:00	London, England	
Loss	3–3	Talita Nogueira	Decision (unanimous)	Bellator 256	April 9, 2021	3	5:00	Uncasville, Connecticut, United States	Nogueira was deducted one point in round 2 due to repeated blows to the back of the head.
Win	3–2	Amber Leibrock	Submission (armbar)	Bellator 226	September 7, 2019	1	4:45	San Jose, California, United States	
Win	2–2	Lucie Bertaud	TKO (punches)	Titan FC 54	April 26, 2019	1	3:36	Fort Lauderdale, Florida, United States	
Loss	1–2	Shanna Young	TKO (submission to punches)	Valor Fighting Challenge 54	January 19, 2019	3	3:24	Knoxville, Tennessee, United States	
Win	1–1	Hayley Turner	TKO (punches)	Battleground MMA: Live in Tampa Bay	May 20, 2017	1	3:39	Largo, Florida, United States	
Loss	0–1	Sarah Payant	TKO (punches)	Premier FC 25	March 10, 2018	2	1:33	Agawam, Massachusetts, United States	Featherweight debut.

== Bare knuckle record ==
Professional record breakdown
4 matches	3 wins	1 loss
By knockout	3	1

Res.	Record	Opponent	Method	Event	Date	Round	Time	Location	Notes
Loss	3–1	Christine Ferea	KO (punch)	BKFC 82	October 4, 2025	4	0:26	Newark, New Jersey, United States	Bantamweight debut. For the symbolic Queen of Violence championship.
Win	3–0	Hannah Rankin	KO	BKFC 72 Dubai: Day 2	April 5, 2025	1	0:32	Dubai, United Arab Emirates	Won the inaugural BKFC Women's Featherweight Championship.
Win	2–0	Katharina Lehner	KO (punch)	BKFC Fight Night Clearwater: Richman vs. Lozano	April 12, 2024	1	0:53	Clearwater, Florida, United States	
Win	1–0	Sarah Click	KO (punches)	BKFC 32	November 5, 2022	1	1:15	Orlando, Florida, United States	
