= Jason Knight (fighter) =

American mixed martial arts fighter

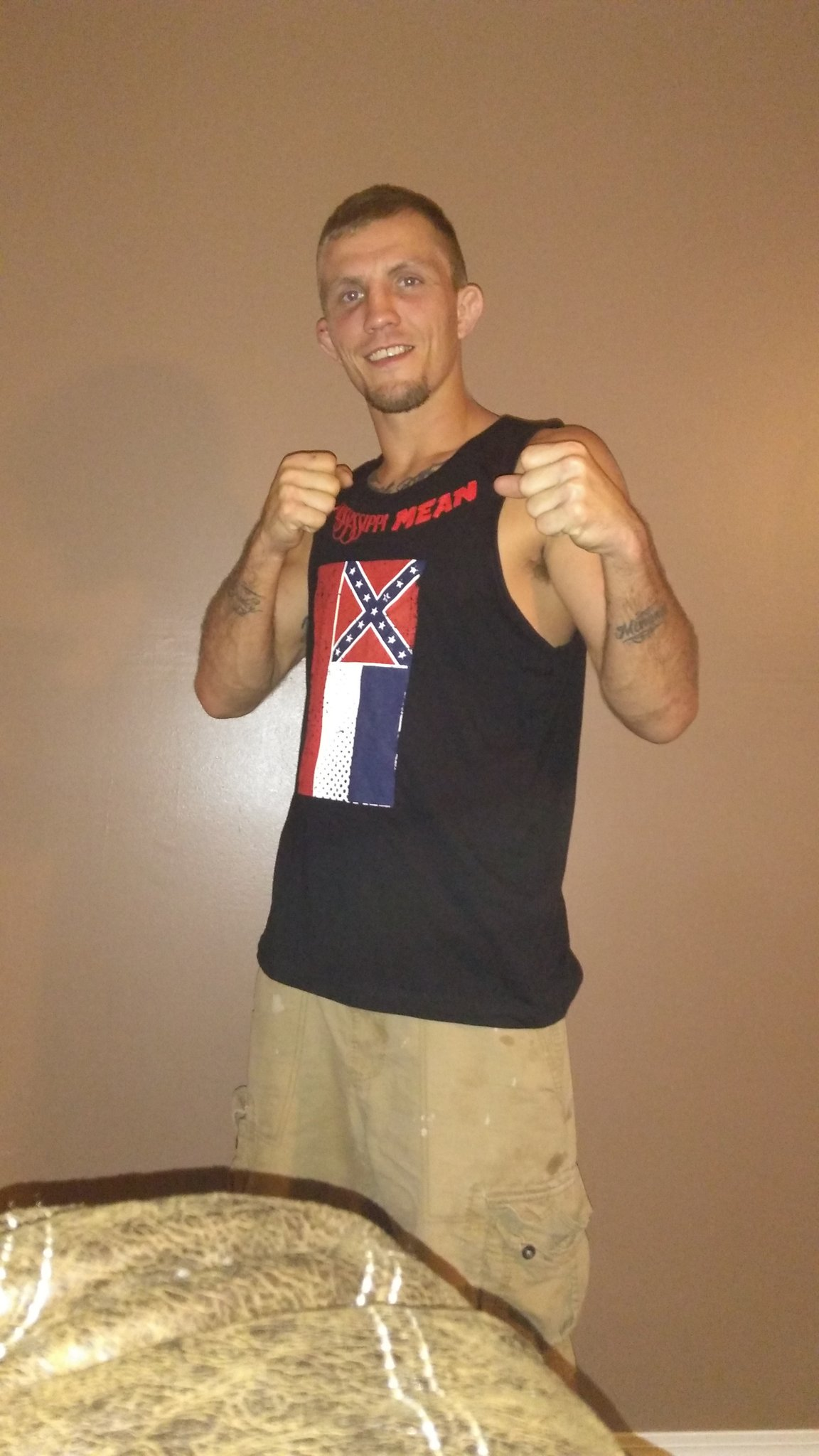
- Knight in 2019
- Born: July 14, 1992 (age 34); D'Iberville, Mississippi, U.S.
- Other names: Hick Diaz
- Height: 5 ft 10 in (1.78 m)
- Weight: 145 lb (66 kg; 10.4 st)
- Division: Featherweight (2009–present); Lightweight (2011–2014)
- Reach: 71 in (180 cm)
- Stance: Orthodox
- Fighting out of: D'Iberville, Mississippi, U.S.
- Team: Alan Belcher MMA Club; American Top Team D'Iberville
- Rank: Brown belt in Brazilian Jiu-Jitsu
- Years active: 2009–2018, 2021–2024

Mixed martial arts record
- Total: 32
- Wins: 23
- By knockout: 4
- By submission: 15
- By decision: 4
- Losses: 9
- By knockout: 2
- By decision: 7

Other information
- Mixed martial arts record from Sherdog

Jason Knight (born July 14, 1992) is an American former bare knuckle boxer and professional mixed martial artist. He previously competed in the UFC and Titan FC and PFL.

== Mixed martial arts career ==
=== Early career ===
Knight began competing as an amateur at the age of 14, and fought ten times before turning professional in 2009 at age 17. He then compiled a record of 16–1 before being signed by the UFC.

=== Ultimate Fighting Championship ===
Knight made his promotional debut against Tatsuya Kawajiri on December 11, 2015, at The Ultimate Fighter 22 Finale, replacing Mirsad Bektić on two weeks' notice. He lost the fight via unanimous decision.

Knight faced Jim Alers on July 23, 2016, at UFC on Fox 20. He won the fight via split decision. The combat was awarded the Fight of the Night bonus.

Knight next faced Dan Hooker on November 26, 2016, at UFC Fight Night 101. He won the fight via unanimous decision.

Knight faced Alex Caceres on January 28, 2017, at UFC on Fox 23. He won the fight via submission in the second round, winning his first Performance of the Night bonus.

Knight faced Chas Skelly on May 13, 2017, at UFC 211. He won the fight via TKO in the third round. The win also earned Knight his second consecutive Performance of the Night bonus award.

Knight faced Ricardo Lamas on July 29, 2017, at UFC 214. He lost the fight via TKO in the first round.

Knight faced Gabriel Benítez on December 9, 2017, at UFC Fight Night 123. He lost the fight via unanimous decision.

Knight faced Makwan Amirkhani on May 27, 2018, at UFC Fight Night 130. Despite four successful knockdowns during the three-round fight, Knight lost via a contentious split decision.

Knight faced Jordan Rinaldi on November 3, 2018, at UFC 230. He lost the fight via unanimous decision and was subsequently released by the organization.

=== Post-UFC career ===
Following the stint in bare-knuckle boxing, Knight was expected to make his return to mixed martial arts against Christopher Ramírez at iKon Fighting Federation 5 on March 5, 2021. However, Ramírez had to withdraw from the fight due to problems getting into the United States and was replaced by Taurean Bogguess. In turn, Bogguess withdrew during the fight week and was replaced by Cliff Wright. Knight won the bout via second-round submission.

On May 29, 2021, it was announced that Knight was scheduled to headline the inaugural event of Jorge Masvidal's Gamebred Fighting Championship against Charles Bennett on June 18, 2021. The bout had typical mixed martial arts rules, but was contested without gloves. Knight was knocked down early on, but went on to win the fight via rear-naked choke submission in round one.

Following the successful bout in Gamebred FC, Knight signed with the Professional Fighters League and faced Bobby Moffett at PFL 9 on August 27, 2021. At weigh-ins, Moffett weighed in at 148.2 pounds, missing weight by 2.2 pounds. The bout proceeded at catchweight and Moffett was fined a percentage of his purse, which went to Knight. He lost the bout via unanimous decision.

On May 19, 2022, Knight headlined Gulf Coast MMA 15 against Rey Trujillo. Knight defeated his opponent by a first-round TKO.

=== The Ultimate Fighter 31 ===
In mid March 2023, it was announced that Knight would be competing in the thirty-first season of The Ultimate Fighter.

In the quarterfinal Knight faced Titan FC Lightweight Champion Landon Quinones, and won the fight via a triangle choke submission in the first round.

In the semi-final, Knight faced teammate Kurt Holobaugh, and lost the fight via TKO in the second round.

=== Gamebred Fighting Championship ===
Knight faced Randy Costa at Gamebred Bareknuckle MMA 6 on November 10, 2023. He lost the fight via knockout in the first round.

Followed by his loss to Joshua Weems at Gamebred Bareknuckle MMA 8 on November 15, 2024, he announced his retirement from combat sports on social media.

== Bare knuckle boxing ==
Following his UFC release, Knight signed a one-fight contract with Bare Knuckle Fighting Championship. He faced Artem Lobov in the main event of BKFC 5 on April 6, 2019. Knight lost the bout and several of his teeth.

Knight was expected to headline BKFC 7 on August 10, 2019, against Leonard Garcia. However, on July 15, 2019, Knight revealed on his social media that he was forced to withdraw from the bout due to a rib injury.

Knight defeated Artem Lobov in a rematch headlining BKFC 9 on November 16, 2019, earning the victory by TKO in the fifth round.

== Personal life ==
In 2012, Knight was arrested and charged with grand larceny.

== Championships and accomplishments ==
=== Mixed martial arts ===
- Ultimate Fighting Championship
  - Fight of the Night (One time) vs. Jim Alers
  - Performance of the Night (Two times) vs. Alex Caceres, vs. Chas Skelly
- Atlas Fights
  - Atlas Fights Featherweight Championship (One time)
    - One successful title defense
  - Interim Atlas Fights Featherweight Championship (One time)

=== Bare-knuckle boxing ===
- Bare Knuckle Fighting Championship
  - BKFC Fight of the Year 2019 vs. Artem Lobov 1

== Mixed martial arts record ==
Professional record breakdown
32 matches	23 wins	9 losses
By knockout	4	2
By submission	15	0
By decision	4	7

Res.	Record	Opponent	Method	Event	Date	Round	Time	Location	Notes
Loss	23–9	Joshua Weems	Decision (unanimous)	Gamebred Bareknuckle MMA 8	November 15, 2024	3	5:00	Biloxi, Mississippi, United States	Catchweight (140 lb) bout. Bare knuckle MMA.
Loss	23–8	Randy Costa	KO (punches)	Gamebred Bareknuckle MMA 6	November 10, 2023	1	1:41	Biloxi, Mississippi, United States	Bare knuckle MMA.
Win	23–7	Rey Trujillo	TKO (punches)	Gulf Coast MMA 15	May 19, 2022	1	2:05	Biloxi, Mississippi, United States	
Loss	22–7	Bobby Moffett	Decision (unanimous)	PFL 9	August 27, 2021	3	5:00	Hollywood, Florida, United States	Catchweight (148.2 lb) bout; Moffett missed weight.
Win	22–6	Charles Bennett	Submission (rear-naked choke)	Gamebred Bareknuckle MMA 1	June 19, 2021	1	3:01	Biloxi, Mississippi, United States	Bare Knuckle MMA.
Win	21–6	Cliff Wright	Submission (rear-naked choke)	iKon Fighting Federation 5	March 5, 2021	2	1:48	Biloxi, Mississippi, United States	
Loss	20–6	Jordan Rinaldi	Decision (unanimous)	UFC 230	November 3, 2018	3	5:00	New York City, New York, United States	
Loss	20–5	Makwan Amirkhani	Decision (split)	UFC Fight Night: Thompson vs. Till	May 27, 2018	3	5:00	Liverpool, England	
Loss	20–4	Gabriel Benítez	Decision (unanimous)	UFC Fight Night: Swanson vs. Ortega	December 9, 2017	3	5:00	Fresno, California, United States	Knight was deducted one point in round 1 for biting Benítez's fingers.
Loss	20–3	Ricardo Lamas	TKO (punches)	UFC 214	July 29, 2017	1	4:34	Anaheim, California, United States	
Win	20–2	Chas Skelly	TKO (punches)	UFC 211	May 13, 2017	3	0:39	Dallas, Texas, United States	Performance of the Night.
Win	19–2	Alex Caceres	Submission (rear-naked choke)	UFC on Fox: Shevchenko vs. Peña	January 28, 2017	2	4:21	Denver, Colorado, United States	Performance of the Night.
Win	18–2	Dan Hooker	Decision (unanimous)	UFC Fight Night: Whittaker vs. Brunson	November 27, 2016	3	5:00	Melbourne, Australia	
Win	17–2	Jim Alers	Decision (split)	UFC on Fox: Holm vs. Shevchenko	July 23, 2016	3	5:00	Chicago, Illinois, United States	Fight of the Night.
Loss	16–2	Tatsuya Kawajiri	Decision (unanimous)	The Ultimate Fighter: Team McGregor vs. Team Faber Finale	December 11, 2015	3	5:00	Las Vegas, Nevada, United States	
Win	16–1	Musa Khamanaev	Submission (triangle choke)	Titan FC 35	September 19, 2015	2	3:06	Ridgefield, Washington, United States	
Win	15–1	Thiago Moisés	Decision (unanimous)	Atlas Fights 25	May 30, 2015	3	5:00	Biloxi, Mississippi, United States	Defended the Atlas Fights Featherweight Championship.
Win	14–1	Michael Roberts	Decision (unanimous)	Atlas Fights 23	April 4, 2015	5	5:00	Biloxi, Mississippi, United States	Won the vacant Atlas Fights Featherweight Championship.
Win	13–1	Gilbert Burgos	Submission (gogoplata)	Atlas FC 4	September 14, 2014	1	1:23	Biloxi, Mississippi, United States	Return to Featherweight.
Win	12–1	Harry Johnson	Submission (Von Flue choke)	V3 Fights: Johnson vs. Shuffield	June 21, 2014	2	4:38	Memphis, Tennessee, United States	
Win	11–1	Tony Way	Submission (inverted triangle choke)	Atlas Fights: Battle on Mobile Bay	April 12, 2014	1	2:03	Mobile, Alabama, United States	
Win	10–1	Ronald Jacobs	TKO (punches)	Atlas Fights 20	January 18, 2014	1	1:43	Biloxi, Mississippi, United States	
Win	9–1	Bradley Collins	Submission (armbar)	Atlas Fights 19	November 16, 2013	1	1:06	Biloxi, Mississippi, United States	Return to Lightweight.
Win	8–1	Matt McCook	Submission (rear naked choke)	Atlas Fights 13	September 22, 2012	1	0:52	Biloxi, Mississippi, United States	
Loss	7–1	Michael Roberts	Decision (unanimous)	Atlas Fights 12	July 14, 2012	3	5:00	Biloxi, Mississippi, United States	For the Atlas Fights Featherweight Championship.
Win	7–0	Shawn Hayes	Submission (triangle choke)	Atlas Fights 10	February 11, 2012	3	4:33	Biloxi, Mississippi, United States	Won the interim Atlas Fights Featherweight Championship.
Win	6–0	James Rutherford	Submission (guillotine choke)	Atlas Fights 9	October 11, 2011	1	3:31	Biloxi, Mississippi, United States	
Win	5–0	Jonathan Burdine	TKO (punches)	FFI: Blood and Sand 10	August 13, 2011	1	2:05	Biloxi, Mississippi, United States	
Win	4–0	Ronald Jacobs	Submission (triangle choke)	UEP: Battle at the Beach	January 16, 2010	2	2:22	Daphne, Alabama, United States	
Win	3–0	Daren Hayes	Submission (triangle choke)	UEP: Battle at the Beach	December 2, 2009	1	3:04	Orange Beach, Alabama, United States	
Win	2–0	Shawn Hayes	Submission (armbar)	No Love Entertainment	November 7, 2009	1	1:50	Biloxi, Mississippi, United States	
Win	1–0	Patrick Needham	Submission (triangle choke)	UEP: The Reckoning	September 24, 2009	1	1:10	Orange Beach, Alabama, United States	

== Mixed martial arts exhibition record ==
Exhibition record breakdown		
2 matches	1 win	1 loss
By knockout	0	1
By submission	1	0

Res.	Record	Opponent	Method	Event	Date	Round	Time	Location	Notes
Loss	1–1	Kurt Holobaugh	TKO (punches)	The Ultimate Fighter: Team McGregor vs. Team Chandler	Aug 8, 2023 (airdate)	2	2:56	Las Vegas, Nevada, United States	The Ultimate Fighter 31 Semi-final round.
Win	1–0	Landon Quiñones	Submission (triangle choke)	The Ultimate Fighter: Team McGregor vs. Team Chandler	Jul 11, 2023 (airdate)	1	0:54	Las Vegas, Nevada, United States	The Ultimate Fighter 31 Quarterfinal round.

== Bare knuckle Boxing record ==
Professional record breakdown
2 matches	1 win	1 loss
By knockout	1	0
By decision	0	1

Res.	Record	Opponent	Method	Event	Date	Round	Time	Location	Notes
Win	1–1	Artem Lobov	TKO (corner stoppage)	BKFC 9	November 16, 2019	5	0:27	Biloxi, Mississippi, United States	
Loss	0–1	Artem Lobov	Decision (unanimous)	BKFC 5	April 6, 2019	5	2:00	Biloxi, Mississippi, United States	Fight of the Year (2019).
