= Guilherme Viana =

Brazilian mixed martial arts fighter

- Born: May 13, 1986 (age 40); Porto Alegre, Rio Grande do Sul, Brazil
- Height: 6 ft 3 in (1.91 m)
- Weight: 205 lb (93 kg; 14.6 st)
- Division: Heavyweight; Light Heavyweight
- Reach: 78.0 in (198 cm)
- Fighting out of: Rio de Janeiro, Brazil
- Team: Teixeira MMA & Fitness; Synergy Fight (formerly)
- Years active: 2012–2016, 2023-present

Mixed martial arts record
- Total: 13
- Wins: 9
- By knockout: 7
- By submission: 2
- Losses: 4
- By knockout: 1
- By decision: 3

Other information
- Mixed martial arts record from Sherdog

Guilherme Viana (born May 13, 1986) is a Brazilian mixed martial artist formerly competing in Bellator's Light Heavyweight division. A professional competitor since 2012, Viana was a contestant on The Ultimate Fighter: Brazil 3. He currently competes as a bare-knuckle boxer in Bare Knuckle Fighting Championship.

== Mixed martial arts career ==
=== Early career ===
Viana began his professional MMA career in March 2012. He quickly compiled a 4–1 record, with his lone loss being against former UFC and Bellator competitor Rodney Wallace, before appearing on The Ultimate Fighter: Brazil 3.

=== The Ultimate Fighter: Brazil 3 ===
In February 2014, Viana was revealed as one of the contestants on The Ultimate Fighter: Brazil 3, competing as a heavyweight. In the fight to get into the house, Viana lost to eventual winner of the heavyweight tournament Antônio Carlos Júnior via TKO in the first round, thus being eliminated from the competition.

=== Bellator MMA ===
Viana made his Bellator and United States debut against nine-time UFC veteran Francis Carmont at Bellator 135 on March 27, 2015. Viana lost the fight via unanimous decision.

Viana faced another UFC veteran in Houston Alexander at Bellator 146 on November 20, 2015. He won the fight via TKO due to a doctor stoppage following the conclusion of the second round.

Viana then faced Philipe Lins at Bellator 159 on July 22, 2016. After a conservative first round from both fighters, Viana lost the fight via TKO due to punches in the second.

== Bare-knuckle boxing career ==
Viana made his Bare Knuckle Fighting Championship debut against Aleem Whitfield on December 20, 2025 at BKFC Fight Night 33. He won by knockout at the end of the second round.

Viana faced Juan Figuerva on January 17, 2026 at BKFC 86. He won the fight by knockout at the end of the first round.

Viana faced Joseph White on March 28, 2026 at BKFC Fight Night 35. He lost the fight by knockout in the first round.

Viana faced Robinson Perez on August 29, 2026 at BKFC 92. He won the fight by technical knockout in the first round. This fight earned him a Knockout of the Night award.

== Personal life ==
Viana has a brother, who is also a mixed martial artist.

== Championships and accomplishments ==
=== Bare-knuckle boxing ===
- Bare Knuckle Fighting Championship
  - Knockout of the Night (One time) vs. Robinson Perez

== Mixed martial arts record ==
Professional record breakdown
13 matches	9 wins	4 losses
By knockout	7	1
By submission	2	0
By decision	0	3

Res.	Record	Opponent	Method	Event	Date	Round	Time	Location	Notes
Loss	9–4	Rasul Magomedov	Decision (unanimous)	PFL 10 (2025)	August 21, 2025	3	5:00	Hollywood, Florida, United States	Light Heavyweight bout.
Win	9–3	Hassan Graham	KO (punches)	Combat Zone 86	November 9, 2024	1	0:53	Manchester, New Hampshire, United States	Won the vacant Combat Zone Heavyweight Championship.
Win	8–3	Terrance Jean-Nacques	TKO (punches)	Combat Zone 83	February 24, 2024	2	3:05	Manchester, New Hampshire, United States	Heavyweight debut.
Loss	7–3	Philipe Lins	TKO (punches)	Bellator 159	July 22, 2016	2	1:13	Mulvane, Kansas, United States	
Win	7–2	Houston Alexander	TKO (doctor stoppage)	Bellator 146	November 20, 2015	2	5:00	Thackerville, Oklahoma, United States	
Loss	6–2	Francis Carmont	Decision (unanimous)	Bellator 135	March 27, 2015	3	5:00	Thackerville, Oklahoma, United States	
Win	6–1	Julio Cesar dos Santos	TKO (punches)	The Hill Fighters 2	July 12, 2014	2	0:46	Gramado, Brazil	
Win	5–1	Cristiano Monteiro	Submission (rear-naked choke)	Shooto Brazil 47	April 4, 2014	1	N/A	Rio Bonito, Brazil	
Win	4–1	Ricardo Silva	TKO (punches)	Watch Out Combat Show 28	August 10, 2013	1	N/A	Gramado, Brazil	
Loss	3–1	Rodney Wallace	Decision (split)	Iron Fight Combat 2	December 7, 2012	3	5:00	Aracaju, Brazil	For the vacant IFC Light Heavyweight Championship.
Win	3–0	Ed Carlos	TKO (punch)	Iron Fight Combat 1	September 1, 2012	1	1:19	Feira de Santana, Brazil	
Win	2–0	Gustavo Gussem	TKO (punches)	Watch Out Combat Show 19	May 18, 2012	1	1:50	Rio de Janeiro, Brazil	
Win	1–0	Eduardo Camilo	Submission (armbar)	MMA Against Dengue 2	March 4, 2012	1	3:51	São Gonçalo, Brazil	Light Heavyweight debut.

== Bare-knuckle boxing record ==
Professional record breakdown
4 matches	3 wins	1 loss
By knockout	3	1
By decision	0	0

Res.	Record	Opponent	Method	Event	Date	Round	Time	Location	Notes
Win	3–1	Robinson Perez	TKO (punches)	BKFC 92	August 29, 2026	1	1:04	Boston, Massachusetts, United States	Knockout of the Night.
Loss	2–1	Joseph White	TKO	BKFC Fight Night Mohegan Sun: Porter vs. Wilson	March 28, 2026	1	0:34	Uncasville, Connecticut, United States	
Win	2–0	Juan Figuerva	KO	BKFC 86	January 17, 2026	1	1:59	Uncasville, Connecticut, United States	
Win	1–0	Aleem Whitfield	KO	BKFC Fight Night Mohegan Sun: Porter vs. Garrett	December 20, 2025	2	1:59	Uncasville, Connecticut, United States	
