= Mark Flanagan (boxer) =

Australian boxer

Mark Manning Flanagan
Personal information
- Nickname: Bam Bam
- Nationality: Australian
- Born: Mark Manning Flanagan; 30 May 1990 (age 36) Townsville, Queensland, Australia
- Height: 1.83 m (6 ft 0 in)
- Weight: Cruiserweight

Boxing career
- Reach: 185 cm (73 in)
- Stance: Orthodox

Boxing record
- Total fights: 35
- Wins: 26
- Win by KO: 19
- Losses: 9

Mark Manning Flanagan (born 30 May 1990) is an Australian professional boxer.

== Professional boxing career ==
Flanagan won the Australian cruiserweight title with a points decision at the Townsville Entertainment and Convention Centre. Flanagan made his first defence against Quinn. Flanagan has won six more bouts, challenging Denis Lebedev for the WBA (Super) cruiserweight title. Denis Lebedev won by unanimous decision.

== Bare-knuckle boxing ==
Flanagan made his debut with Bare Knuckle Fighting Championship against fellow promotional newcomer Dilan Prašović on 18 April 2026 at BKFC Fight Night 37. He lost the fight by technical knockout at the end of the second round.

== Professional boxing record ==
31 fights	24 wins	7 losses
By knockout	17	2
By decision	7	5

== Bare knuckle boxing record ==
Professional record breakdown
1 match	0 wins	1 loss
By knockout	0	1

Res.	Record	Opponent	Method	Event	Date	Round	Time	Location	Notes
Loss	0–1	Dilan Prašović	TKO (referee stoppage)	BKFC Fight Night Australia: Hepi vs. Wiśniewski 2	18 April 2026	1	2:00	Townsville, Australia	
