= 2026 in Bare Knuckle Fighting Championship =

Information
- First date: January 17, 2026

Events

Fights

Chronology
2025 in BKFC	2026 in Bare Knuckle Fighting Championship	2027 in BKFC

The year 2026 is the ninth year in the history of the Bare Knuckle Fighting Championship, a bare-knuckle fighting promotion based in Philadelphia.

== Background ==
The 2026 season started with BKFC 86 Mohegan Sun: Lane vs. Pague on January 17, 2026.

== List of events ==
#	Event	Date	Venue	Location
1	BKFC 86 Mohegan Sun: Lane vs. Pague	January 17, 2026	Mohegan Sun Arena	Uncasville, Connecticut, United States
2	BKFC Knucklemania VI	February 7, 2026	Xfinity Mobile Arena	Philadelphia, Pennsylvania, United States
3	BKFC Fight Night Newcastle: Terrill vs. McFarlane	March 14, 2026	Utilita Arena	Newcastle upon Tyne, England
4	BKFC 87 Hollywood, FL: Stewart vs. Gaffie	March 20, 2026	Seminole Hard Rock Hotel & Casino Hollywood	Hollywood, Florida, United States
5	BKFC Fight Night Mohegan Sun: Porter vs. Wilson	March 28, 2026	Mohegan Sun Arena	Uncasville, Connecticut, United States
6	BKFC Fight Night Honolulu: Pitolo vs. Coltrane	April 11, 2026	Blaisdell Center	Honolulu, Hawaii, United States
7	BKFC 88 Denver: Camozzi vs. Rodriguez	April 17, 2026	National Western Center	Denver, Colorado, United States
8	BKFC Fight Night Australia: Hepi vs. Wiśniewski 2	April 18, 2026	Townsville Entertainment and Convention Centre	Townsville, Australia
9	BKFC Fight Night Clearwater: Gaskins vs. Guymon	April 25, 2026	OCC Road House	Clearwater, Florida, United States
10	BKFC Blood 4 Blood	May 6, 2026	Ocean Center	Daytona Beach, Florida, United States
11	BKFC 89 Palm Desert: Herring vs. Larrimore	May 22, 2026	Acrisure Arena	Thousand Palms, California, United States
12	BKFC 90 Birmingham: Tierney vs. Franco	May 30, 2026	Utilita Arena Birmingham	Birmingham, England
13	BKFC Fight Night Hollywood: Lane vs. Henry	June 4, 2026	Seminole Hard Rock Hotel & Casino Hollywood	Hollywood, Florida, United States
14	BKFC Fight Night Nashville: Soto vs. Deleon	June 19, 2026	The Pinnacle	(United States) Nashville, Tennessee
15	BKFC Fight Night Hammond: VanCamp vs. Cisneros	June 26, 2026	Horseshoe Hammond	Hammond, Indiana, United States
16	BKFC Liberty Brawl	July 3, 2026	Xfinity Mobile Arena	Philadelphia, Pennsylvania, United States
17	BKFC 91 Naples: Hunt vs. Pugliesi	July 18, 2026	Arena Flegrea	Naples, Italy
18	BKFC Fight Night Uruguay: Reyno vs. Krejci	July 25, 2026	Antel Arena	Montevideo, Uruguay
19	BKFC Fight Night Newcastle: Garside vs. Taylor	August 1, 2026	Walker Activity Dome	Newcastle upon Tyne, England
20	BKFC Fight Night Sturgis: Acheson vs. Jones	August 8, 2026	Buffalo Chip Campground	Sturgis, South Dakota, United States
21	BKFC Fight Night Mohegan Sun: Henry vs. Trinidad	August 21, 2026	Mohegan Sun Arena	Uncasville, Connecticut, United States
22	BKFC 92 Boston: Stewart vs. Gigliotti	August 29, 2026	Fenway Park	Boston, Massachusetts, United States
23	BKFC 93 Hollywood: Perdomo vs. Hill	September 11, 2026	Seminole Hard Rock Hotel & Casino Hollywood	Hollywood, Florida, United States
24	BKFC 94 Manchester: Till vs. Romero	September 26, 2026	Manchester Arena	Manchester, England
25	BKFC Fight Night Australia: Hepi vs. Shewmaker	October 3, 2026	Eatons Hills Hotel	Queensland, Australia
26	BKFC Fight Night Betheleham: Cisneros vs. Petersen	October 9, 2026	Wind Creek Event Center	Bethlehem, Pennsylvania, United States
27	BKFC Fight Night Belgrade: Faulkner vs. Prašović	October 17, 2026	Belgrade Arena	Belgrade, Serbia
28	BKFC 95 Newark: Herring vs. Dodson	October 17, 2026	Prudential Center	Newark, New Jersey, United States
29	BKFC Fight Night Clearwater: Reber vs. Street	October 23, 2026	OCC Road House	Clearwater, Florida, United States
30	BKFC 96 Glasgow: Cooke vs. Weir	November 7, 2026	OVO Hydro	Glasgow, Scotland, United Kingdom
31	BKFC Fight Night Myrtle Beach: Richardson vs. Oxendine	November 20, 2026	John T. Rhodes Myrtle Beach Sports Center	Myrtle Beach, South Carolina, United States
32	BKFC Fight Night Hershey: Pague vs. Richman	December 4, 2026	Giant Center	Hershey, Pennsylvania, United States
33	BKFC 97 Hollywood, FL: Henry vs. Collard	December 11, 2026	Seminole Hard Rock Hotel & Casino Hollywood	Hollywood, Florida, United States

== BKFC 86 Mohegan Sun: Lane vs. Pague ==
BKFC 86 Mohegan Sun: Lane vs. Pague
- Promotion: Bare Knuckle Fighting Championship
- Date: January 17, 2026
- Venue: Mohegan Sun Arena
- City: Uncasville, Connecticut, United States

BKFC 86 Mohegan Sun: Lane vs. Pague (also known as BKFC on DAZN 9) was a bare-knuckle fighting event held by Bare Knuckle Fighting Championship on January 17, 2026.

=== Background ===
A BKFC Welterweight Championship bout between current champion Julian Lane and Dustin Pague headlined the event. Former WBO junior lightweight boxing champion Jamel Herring made his debut against Matt Guymon.

=== Fight card ===
BKFC 86 Mohegan Sun: Lane vs. Pague
Weight Class				Method	Round	Time	Notes
Welterweight 75 kg	(United States) Dustin Pague	def.	(United States) Julian Lane (c)	Decision (unanimous) (57-56, 57-56, 57-56)	6	2:00	For the BKFC Welterweight Championship. The fight went to a sixth overtime round.
Bantamweight 61 kg	(United States) Jamel Herring	def.	(United States) Matt Guymon	Decision (unanimous) (50-43, 50-43, 50-43)	5	2:00	
Welterweight 75 kg	(United States) Ramiro Figueroa	def.	(United States) Dalvin Blair	Decision (unanimous) (49-46, 49-46, 48-47)	5	2:00	
Lightweight 70 kg	(United States) Rico DiSciullo	def.	(United States) Ashton Caniglia	KO	2	0:26	
Heavyweight 120 kg	(Brazil) Guilherme Viana	def.	(United States) Juan Figuerva	KO	1	1:59	
Heavyweight 120 kg	(United States) Ras Hylton	def.	(United States) Branko Busick	TKO	5	1:53	
Lightweight 70 kg	(United States) Trey Martin	def.	(United States) Nathan Ghareeb	Decision (split) (47-48, 48-47, 49-46)	5	2:00	
Featherweight 66 kg	(United States) Joey Gambino	def.	(United States) Kurtis Ellis	TKO	2	1:08	
Preliminary Card
Featherweight 66 kg	(United States) Brandon Meneses	def.	(United States) Zach Pannell	TKO	1	0:55	
Bantamweight 61 kg	(United States) Jared Lennon	vs.	(United States) Chachi Versace	Draw (48-46, 46-48, 47-47)	5	2:00	

== BKFC Knucklemania VI ==
BKFC Knucklemania 7698
- Promotion: Bare Knuckle Fighting Championship
- Date: February 7, 2026
- Venue: Xfinity Mobile Arena
- City: Philadelphia, Pennsylvania, United States
- Attendance: 18,217

BKFC Knucklemania VI was a bare-knuckle fighting event that was held by Bare Knuckle Fighting Championship on February 7, 2026.

=== Background ===
A BKFC World Heavyweight Championship bout between champion Ben Rothwell and former UFC Heavyweight Champion Andrei Arlovski took place at the event. The two previously met twice in mixed martial arts: first in July 2008 at Affliction: Banned, where Arlovski won by third‑round knockout, and again in July 2019 at UFC on ESPN: dos Anjos vs. Edwards, where Arlovski earned a unanimous decision victory.

A heavyweight bout between current BKFC Light Heavyweight World Champion (also former Cruiserweight World Champion) Lorenzo Hunt and former UFC Middleweight Championship challenger Yoel Romero (also former Bellator Light Heavyweight World Championship challenger) was scheduled to serve as the co-main event. However, Romero became ill with the flu and was replaced by current BKFC Middleweight Champion David Mundell in a non-title 199 lb catchweight bout.

Matthew Semelsberger was scheduled to fight Prince Nyseam but he was forced to pull out of the fight due to severe neck pain and was replaced by Brett Shoenfelt.

=== Bonus awards ===
The following fighters were awarded bonuses:

- Fight of the Night: Patrick Brady vs. Bear Hill
- Knockouts of the Night: Lorenzo Hunt and Cody Russell

=== Fight Card ===
BKFC Knucklemania VI
Weight Class				Method	Round	Time	Notes
Heavyweight 120 kg	(Belarus) Andrei Arlovski	def.	(United States) Ben Rothwell (c)	TKO (doctor stoppage)	3	1:14	For the BKFC World Heavyweight Championship.
Catchweight 90 kg	(United States) Lorenzo Hunt	def.	(United States) David Mundell	KO	4	0:29	
Middleweight 79 kg	(United States) John Garbarino	def.	(United States) Kaine Tomlinson Jr.	TKO (referee stoppage)	5	0:49	
Lightweight 70 kg	(United States) Ben Bonner	def.	(United States) Tony Soto	Decision (unanimous) (49-46, 48-47, 49-46)	5	2:00	
Heavyweight 120 kg	(United States) Patrick Brady	def.	(United States) Bear Hill	Decision (unanimous) (50-42, 50-41, 49-43)	5	2:00	
W.Bantamweight 61 kg	(Canada) Jade Masson-Wong	def.	(United States) Crystal Pittman	Decision (unanimous) (50-45, 50-45, 50-45)	5	2:00	
Middleweight 79 kg	(United States) Mike Richman	def.	(United States) Joe Elmore	Decision (majority) (47-47, 48-46, 49-46)	5	2:00	
Featherweight 66 kg	(United States) Charles Bennett	def.	(United States) Pat Sullivan	TKO (punches)	2	1:56	
Middleweight 79 kg	(United States) Cody Russell	def.	(United States) Harrison Aiken	TKO (punches)	2	1:16	
Lightweight 70 kg	(United States) Zedekiah Montanez	def.	(United States) Brandon Meyer	KO	2	1:59	
Preliminary Card
Cruiserweight 93 kg	(United States) Lex Ludlow	def.	(United States) Zach Culmus	Decision (unanimous) (30-26, 30-26, 30-26)	3	2:00	
Middleweight 79 kg	(United States) Prince Nyseam	def.	(United States) Brett Shoenfelt	Decision (unanimous) (30-25, 30-25, 30-25)	3	2:00	
Bantamweight 61 kg	(United States) Joshua Oxendine	def.	(United States) Travis Thompson	Decision (unanimous) (30-27, 30-27, 30-27)	3	2:00	

== BKFC Fight Night Newcastle: Terrill vs. McFarlane ==
BKFC Fight Night Newcastle: Terrill vs. McFarlane
- Promotion: Bare Knuckle Fighting Championship
- Date: March 14, 2026
- Venue: Utilita Arena
- City: Newcastle upon Tyne, England

BKFC Fight Night Newcastle: Terrill vs. McFarlane (also known as BKFC Fight Night 34 and BKFC UK 15) was a bare-knuckle fighting event to be held by Bare Knuckle Fighting Championship on March 15, 2026.

=== Background ===
A heavyweight bout between former BKFC Heavyweight World Champion Mick Terrill and Jay McFarlane is scheduled to headline the event.

=== Fight card ===
BKFC Fight Night Newcastle: Terrill vs. McFarlane
Weight Class				Method	Round	Time	Notes
Heavyweight 120 kg	(United Kingdom) Mick Terrill	def.	(United Kingdom) Jay McFarlane	TKO (punches)	1	0:53	For the inaugural BKFC UK Heavyweight Championship.
Light Heavyweight 84 kg	(United Kingdom) Sean Weir	def.	(United Kingdom) Matty Hodgson	TKO	1	1:42	
Heavyweight 120 kg	(Albania) Gzim Selmani	def.	(United Kingdom) Daniel Curtin	KO	2	0:22	
Bantamweight 61 kg	(United Kingdom) Lewis Garside	def.	(United Kingdom) Kieron Sewell	Decision (unanimous)	5	2:00	50-45, 49-47, 48-47
Middleweight 79 kg	(United Kingdom) Joe Lister	def.	(United Kingdom) Danny Wall	KO	1	1:28	
Middleweight 79 kg	(United Kingdom) Jack Cullen	def.	(United Kingdom) Marley Churcher	KO	2	1:59	
Cruiserweight 93 kg	(United Kingdom) Dec Spelman	def.	(United Kingdom) Jonny Redmond	TKO	1	2:00	
Lightweight 70 kg	(United Kingdom) Lewis Keen	def.	(United Kingdom) Jon Telfer	Decision (unanimous)	5	2:00	50-43, 50-43, 50-44
Featherweight 66 kg	(United Kingdom) James Lilley	def.	(Netherlands) Yannick Van Dinther	KO	1	0:38	
Welterweight 75 kg	(United Kingdom) Mikey Henderson	def.	(United Kingdom) Liam Dooley	TKO	1	2:00	
Heavyweight 120 kg	(United Kingdom) James Walker	def.	(United Kingdom) Mohammed Saleem	TKO	4	2:00	
Preliminary Card
Featherweight 66 kg	(United Kingdom) Jeff Saunders	def.	(United Kingdom) Bartek Kanabey	TKO	3	0:28	
Lightweight 70 kg	(United Kingdom) Stew Martin	def.	(United Kingdom) Jordan Burnett	TKO	1	2:00	

== BKFC 87 Hollywood, FL: Stewart vs. Gaffie ==
BKFC 87 Hollywood, FL: Stewart vs. Gaffie
- Promotion: Bare Knuckle Fighting Championship
- Date: March 20, 2026
- Venue: Seminole Hard Rock Hotel & Casino Hollywood
- City: Hollywood, Florida, United States

BKFC 87 Hollywood, FL: Stewart vs. Gaffie was a bare-knuckle fighting event to be held by Bare Knuckle Fighting Championship on March 20, 2026.

=== Background ===
A BKFC Featherweight Championship bout between current undefeated champion Kai Stewart and fellow current unbeaten BKFC Europe Featherweight Champion Nico Gaffie headlined the event.

=== Fight card ===
BKFC 87 Hollywood, FL: Stewart vs. Gaffie
Weight Class				Method	Round	Time	Notes
Featherweight 66 kg	(United States) Kai Stewart	def.	(Spain) Nico Gaffie	Decision (unanimous) (49-46, 49-46, 48-47)	5	2:00	For the BKFC Featherweight Championship.
Heavyweight 120 kg	(Cuba) Leonardo Perdomo	def.	(United States) Rashad Coulter	TKO (punches)	1	1:07	
Bantamweight 61 kg	(United States) Bryan Duran	def.	(United States) Derek Perez	TKO (punches)	1	0:19	
W.Strawweight 52 kg	(United States) Shelby Cannon	def.	(United States) Rosalinda Rodriguez	Decision (split) (48-46, 46-49, 49-45)	5	2:00	
Light Heavyweight 84 kg	(United States) Leonel Carrera	def.	(United States) Sabah Homasi	DQ (illegal strike)	2	1:06	
Light Heavyweight 84 kg	(South Africa) Jeremy Smith	def.	(United States) Donald Sanchez	Decision (split) (48-47, 48-47, 47-48)	5	2:00	
Bantamweight 61 kg	(United States) Robert Armas	def.	(United States) AJ Rodriguez	TKO (corner stoppage)	3	2:00	
Flyweight 57 kg	(United States) Jancarlos Rivera	def.	(United States) Samuel Samples	TKO (punches)	1	1:59	
Preliminary Card
Flyweight 57 kg	(United States) Chris Garcia	def.	(United States) Chancey Wilson	TKO (punches)	2	0:19	
Heavyweight 120 kg	(United States) Chino Blume	def.	(United States) Alex Davis	Decision (split) (30-27, 30-27, 27-30)	5	2:00	
Bantamweight 61 kg	(Cuba) Ernesto Suarez	def.	(United States) Victor Flor	TKO (punches)	1	1:56	

== BKFC Fight Night Mohegan Sun: Porter vs. Wilson ==
BKFC Fight Night Mohegan Sun: Porter vs. Wilson
- Promotion: Bare Knuckle Fighting Championship
- Date: March 28, 2026
- Venue: Mohegan Sun Arena
- City: Uncasville, Connecticut, United States

BKFC Fight Night Mohegan Sun: Porter vs. Wilson (also known as BKFC Fight Night 35) was a bare-knuckle fighting event held by Bare Knuckle Fighting Championship on March 28, 2026.

=== Background ===
A heavyweight bout between Parker Porter and Haze Wilson headlined the event.

=== Fight card ===
BKFC Fight Night Mohegan Sun: Porter vs. Wilson
Weight Class				Method	Round	Time	Notes
Heavyweight 120 kg	(United States) Parker Porter	def.	(United States) Haze Wilson	TKO (doctor stoppage)	3	2:00	
Middleweight 79 kg	(United States) Pat Casey	def.	(United States) Zeb Vincent	Decision (unanimous) (50-41, 49-42, 50-41)	5	2:00	
Lightweight 70 kg	(United States) Rico DiSciullo	def.	(United States) Elijah Harris	TKO	5	1:07	
Featherweight 66 kg	(United States) Harry Gigliotti	def.	(United States) Timmy Mason	TKO	2	0:47	
Middleweight 79 kg	(United States) Gary Balletto III	def.	(Canada) Adam De Freitas	TKO	2	1:46	
W.Flyweight 57 kg	(United States) Alexandra Ballou	vs.	(United States) Taylor Dagner	Draw (unanimous) (28-28, 28-28, 28-28)	3	2:00	
Heavyweight 120 kg	(United States) Joseph White	def.	(Brazil) Guilherme Viana	TKO	1	0:34	
Light Heavyweight 84 kg	(United States) Joseph Peters	def.	(United States) Maurice Horne	TKO	3	1:56	
Preliminary Card
Welterweight 75 kg	(United States) Joshua Whiteside	def.	(United States) Isiah Williams	TKO	2	1:11	
Light Heavyweight 84 kg	(United States) David Burke	def.	(United States) Terryl Johnson	KO	1	0:30	
W.Bantamweight 61 kg	(United States) Nadia Moreno	vs.	(United States) Sophia Hayes	Decision (unanimous) (30-27, 30-27, 29-28)	5	2:00	

== BKFC Fight Club (cancelled) ==
BKFC Fight Club (cancelled)
- Promotion: Bare Knuckle Fighting Championship
- Date: April 7, 2026
- Venue: 2300 Arena
- City: Philadelphia, Pennsylvania, United States

BKFC Fight Club (cancelled) was supposed to be a bare-knuckle fighting event to be held by Bare Knuckle Fighting Championship on April 7, 2026. However, the event did not take place for unknown reasons.

=== Background ===
This was scheduled be the first BKFC Fight Club event. BKFC Fight Club cards are small‑scale shows held in warehouse‑style venues with limited attendance, featuring competitors matched by similar weight and experience levels. All bouts are approved by the local athletic commission, and fighters are paired through a random draw shortly before competing. The promotion plans to stage one Fight Club event per month.

== BKFC Fight Night Honolulu: Pitolo vs. Coltrane ==
BKFC Fight Night Honolulu: Pitolo vs. Coltrane
- Promotion: Bare Knuckle Fighting Championship
- Date: April 11, 2026
- Venue: Blaisdell Center
- City: Honolulu, Hawaii, United States

BKFC Fight Night Honolulu: Pitolo vs. Coltrane (also known as BKFC Fight Night 36) was a bare-knuckle fighting event held by Bare Knuckle Fighting Championship on April 11, 2026.

=== Background ===
A middleweight bout between former BKFC Middleweight Championship challenger Doug Coltrane and promotional newcomer Maki Pitolo headlined the event.

=== Fight card ===
BKFC Fight Night Honolulu: Pitolo vs. Coltrane
Weight Class				Method	Round	Time	Notes
Middleweight 79 kg	(United States) Doug Coltrane	def.	(United States) Maki Pitolo	KO	1	1:59	
Light Heavyweight 84 kg	(United States) Joseph Creer	def.	(United States) Keali'i Kanekoa	TKO	3	2:00	
Featherweight 66 kg	(United States) Toby Misech	def.	(United States) Charles Bennett	Decision (unanimous) (47–44, 47–44, 47–44)	5	2:00	
Welterweight 75 kg	(United States) Justin Cornell	def.	(United States) Zach Zane	TKO	2	1:01	
Lightweight 70 kg	(Philippines) Christopher Inocencio	def.	(United States) Jovan Alayon	TKO	1	1:15	
Light Heavyweight 84 kg	(United States) Namakana Pakala	def.	(United States) Chris Cisneros	Decision (unanimous) (45–44, 45–44, 45–44)	5	2:00	
Middleweight 79 kg	(United States) Randy Kamaiopili Jr	def.	(United States) Shiro Hitto	TKO	2	0:27	
W.Flyweight 57 kg	(United States) Hazel Naheinaena	def.	(United States) Kat Rabellizsa	Decision (unanimous) (29–28, 29–28, 30–27)	5	2:00	
Bantamweight 61 kg	(United States) Maika Samson	def.	(United States) Nalu Cenal	KO	2	0:32	
Preliminary Card
Lightweight 70 kg	(United States) Nicholas Saragosa	def.	(United States) Andru Davis-Henry	KO	2	1:30	
Welterweight 75 kg	(United States) Joseph Calarruda	def.	(United States) Fatu Tuitasi	Decision (unanimous) (30–25, 30–25, 30–25)	5	2:00	
Lightweight 70 kg	(United States) Jerome Macalino	def.	(United States) Pono Enos	KO	1	1:54	
Cruiserweight 93 kg	(United States) Vincent Aragona	def.	(United States) Simeon Crawford	KO	1	0:36	

== BKFC 88 Denver: Camozzi vs. Rodriguez ==
BKFC 88 Denver: Camozzi vs. Rodriguez
- Promotion: Bare Knuckle Fighting Championship
- Date: April 17, 2026
- Venue: National Western Center
- City: Denver, Colorado, United States

BKFC 88 Denver: Camozzi vs. Rodriguez is an upcoming bare-knuckle fighting event to be held by Bare Knuckle Fighting Championship on April 18, 2026.

=== Background ===
An interlim BKFC Cruiserweight Championship bout between former champion Chris Camozzi and Esteban Rodriguez is scheduled to headline the event.

=== Fight card ===
BKFC 88 Denver: Camozzi vs. Rodriguez
Weight Class				Method	Round	Time	Notes
Cruiserweight 93 kg	(United States) Chris Camozzi	vs.	(United States) Esteban Rodriguez				For the interim BKFC Cruiserweight Championship.
Lightweight 70 kg	(United States) Ramiro Figueroa	vs.	(Puerto Rico) Elvin Brito				
Heavyweight 120 kg	(United States) Josh Copeland	vs.	(United States) Corey Willis				
Cruiserweight 93 kg	(United States) Josh Fremd	vs.	(United States) Jared Torgeson				
Welterweight 75 kg	(United States) Andrew Yates	vs.	(United States) Rodney Hinton				
Flyweight 57 kg	(United States) Octavin Turner	vs.	(United States) Joby Steffensmeier				
Bantamweight 61 kg	(United States) Noah Aldana	vs.	(United States) Nick Burgos				
Cruiserweight 93 kg	(United States) Deron Winn	vs.	(United States) Erick Lozano				
Flyweight 57 kg	(United States) Angelo Trujillo	vs.	(United States) Anthony Yost				
Lightweight 70 kg	(United States) Matt Maestas	vs.	(United States) Ruben Arroyo				

== BKFC Fight Night Australia: Hepi vs. Wiśniewski 2 ==
BKFC Fight Night Australia: Hepi vs. Wiśniewski 2
- Promotion: Bare Knuckle Fighting Championship
- Date: April 18, 2026
- Venue: Townsville Entertainment and Convention Centre
- City: Townsville, Australia

BKFC Fight Night Australia: Hepi vs. Wiśniewski 2 (also known as BKFC Fight Night 37) was a bare-knuckle fighting event held by Bare Knuckle Fighting Championship on April 18, 2026.

=== Background ===
This event marked the promotion's first event in Australia.

A heavyweight rematch between Haze Hepi and Krzysztof Wiśniewski headlined the event. The pair previously met at BKFC 83 in October 2025, where Wiśniewski won by technical knockout at the end of the third round.

BKFC Fight Night Australia: Hepi vs. Wiśniewski 2
Weight Class				Method	Round	Time	Notes
Heavyweight 120 kg	(Australia) Haze Hepi	def.	(Poland) Krzysztof Wiśniewski	KO	2	1:44	
Heavyweight 120 kg	(Montenegro) Dilan Prašović	def.	(Australia) Mark Flanagan	TKO (referee stoppage)	1	2:00	
Welterweight 75 kg	(Australia) Josh Kuhne	def.	(Australia) Mick Whitehead	TKO (referee stoppage)	3	0:51	
Middleweight 79 kg	(Australia) Boaz Kapua	def.	(Australia) Brayden Marzona	TKO (referee stoppage)	1	1:03	
Lightweight 70 kg	(Australia) Hunter Ioane	def.	(Australia) Luke Bampton	KO	3	1:13	
Featherweight 66 kg	(Australia) Ryan Winnett	def.	(Australia) Cooper Clarke	TKO (referee stoppage)	3	0:45	
Heavyweight 120 kg	(Tonga) Fetongi Tuinauvai	def.	(Australia) Patrick Tolone	KO	1	0:30	
Preliminary Card
Middleweight 80 kg	(New Zealand) Asher Jack	def.	(Australia) Chris Drummond	TKO (referee stoppage)	2	1:09	
Light heavyweight 84 kg	(Australia) Sebastian Temesi	def.	(Hawaii) Alvin Kanehailua	TKO (referee stoppage)	1	1:13	
Heavyweight 120 kg	(Australia) Darcy Braine	def.	(Australia) Richie Fa'osa	Decision (unanimous) (30–26, 30–26, 30–26)	5	2:00	

== BKFC Fight Night Clearwater: Gaskins vs. Guymon ==
BKFC Fight Night Clearwater: Gaskins vs. Guymon
- Promotion: Bare Knuckle Fighting Championship
- Date: April 24, 2026
- Venue: OCC Road House
- City: Clearwater, Florida, United States

BKFC Fight Night Clearwater: Gaskins vs. Guymon (also known as BKFC Fight Night 38) was a bare-knuckle fighting event held by Bare Knuckle Fighting Championship on April 24, 2026.

=== Background ===
A light heavyweight between Jared Warren and BKFC UK Light Heavyweight Championship Conor Cooke was scheduled to headline the event. However, for unknown reasons, the bout was removed and replaced with a bantamweight bout between Quentin Gaskins and Matt Guymon.

=== Fight card ===
BKFC Fight Night Clearwater: Gaskins vs. Guymon
Weight Class				Method	Round	Time	Notes
Bantamweight 61 kg	(United States) Quentin Gaskins	def.	(United States) Matt Guymon	KO	2	1:59	
Bantamweight 61 kg	(United States) Ryan Reber	def.	(United States) Joshua Oxendine	Decision (unanimous) (49–44, 49–44, 48–45)	5	2:00	
W.Strawweight 52 kg	(United States) Kat Paprocki	def.	(South Africa) Crystal Van Wyk	Decision (unanimous) (49–46, 49–46, 50–45)	5	2:00	
Middleweight 79 kg	(United States) Tony Murphy	def.	(United States) Skyler Mauller	TKO	2	0:39	
Welterweight 75 kg	(United States) Mike Heckert	def.	(United States) Justin Walters	TKO	1	1:18	
Featherweight 66 kg	(United States) Brandon Allen	def.	(United States) Lukas Jones	KO	1	1:58	
Middleweight 79 kg	(United States) Frankie Solomon Jr.	def.	(United States) Rickie McConnico	Decision (unanimous) (50–45, 50–45, 49–46)	5	2:00	
Lightweight 70 kg	(United States) Anthony Foye	def.	(United States) Jason DiNunzio	Decision (unanimous) (49–44, 49–44, 48–44)	5	2:00	
Preliminary Card
Heavyweight 120 kg	(United States) Terry Williams	def.	(United States) Bolo Carthon	KO	3	1:23	
Flyweight 57 kg	(United States) Gabriel Hernandez	def.	(United States) Chachi Versace	KO	3	1:14	
Lightweight 70 kg	(United States) Anthony Grubbs	def.	(United States) Thomas Jungles	KO	3	0:25	

== BKFC Blood 4 Blood ==
BKFC Blood 4 Blood
- Promotion: Bare Knuckle Fighting Championship
- Date: May 6, 2026
- Venue: Ocean Center
- City: Daytona Beach, Florida, United States

BKFC Blood 4 Blood was a bare-knuckle fighting event to be held by Bare Knuckle Fighting Championship on May 6, 2026.

=== Background ===
This event marked the promotion's inaugural Blood 4 Blood event.

Blood 4 Blood is a BKFC event concept created in partnership with Danny Wimmer Presents that combines bare‑knuckle bouts with live heavy metal performances. Designed as a "4 Brawls, 4 Bands" crossover show, the card features a middleweight bout between Slaughter to Prevail frontman Alex Terrible facing Cameron Delano, alongside performances from Slaughter to Prevail, Black Label Society, Crowbar, and Malevolence. The series aims to blend combat sports with heavy music in a single live event format.

Taylor Starling was scheduled to face Marisol Ruelas in a women's flyweight bout, but Ruelas was replaced by Sydney Smith for unknown reasons.

=== Fight card ===
BKFC Blood 4 Blood
Weight Class				Method	Round	Time	Notes
Middleweight 79 kg	(United States) Cameron Delano	def.	(Russia) Alex Terrible	TKO	3	0:29	
Middleweight 79 kg	(United States) Jake Bostwick	def.	(United States) Roderick Stewart	KO	2	1:25	
W.Flyweight 57 kg	(United States) Taylor Starling	def.	(United States) Sydney Smith	TKO	2	1:32	
Heavyweight 120 kg	(Russia) Sergey "Kratos" Kalinin	def.	(United States) Brock Walker	TKO	1	1:06	

== BKFC 89 Palm Desert: Herring vs. Larrimore ==
BKFC 89 Palm Desert: Herring vs. Larrimore
- Promotion: Bare Knuckle Fighting Championship
- Date: May 22, 2026
- Venue: Acrisure Arena
- City: Thousand Palms, California, United States

BKFC 89 Palm Desert: Herring vs. Larrimore (also known as BKFC on DAZN 10) was a bare-knuckle fighting event held by Bare Knuckle Fighting Championship on May 22, 2026.

=== Background ===
A bantamweight bout for the vacant BKFC Bantamweight Championship between former WBO junior lightweight boxing champion Jamel Herring and Nate Maness headlined the event. Previous champion Justin Ibarrola vacated the belt after signing with Misfits Boxing. However, Maness withdrew due to not being medically cleared and was replaced by Michael Larrimore.

=== Fight card ===
BKFC 89 Palm Desert: Herring vs. Larrimore
Weight Class				Method	Round	Time	Notes
Bantamweight 61 kg	(United States) Jamel Herring	def.	(United States) Michael Larrimore	Decision (unanimous) (50-44, 50-44, 50-44)	5	2:00	For the vacant BKFC Bantamweight Championship
Light Heavyweight 84 kg	(United States) Cody Vidal	def.	(United States) Jomi Escoboza	TKO (punches)	1	1:58	
Heavyweight 120 kg	(United States) Levi Costa	def.	(United States) Chase Gormley	TKO (punches)	1	1:38	
Bantamweight 61 kg	(United States) Anthony Sanchez	def.	(United States) David Diaz	Decision (unanimous) (48-44, 49-43, 50-42)	5	2:00	
Heavyweight 120 kg	(United States) Eric Soto	def.	(United States) Pernell Stevens	TKO (punches)	1	1:46	
Welterweight 75 kg	(Russia) Evgenii Kurdanov	def.	(United States) Erik Lopez	TKO (punches)	2	0:41	
Welterweight 75 kg	(United States) Ryan Petersen	def.	(United States) Daniel Keepers	Decision (unanimous) (49-45, 49-45, 48-46)	5	2:00	
Preliminary Card
Cruiserweight 93 kg	(United States) Iman Williams	def.	(United States) Cody Kerr	KO (punch)	2	0:55	
Cruiserweight 93 kg	(United States) Keith Richardson	def.	(United States) Devon Schwan	TKO (punches)	2	0:41	
Bantamweight 61 kg	(United States) Ricardo Talavera Jr	def.	(United States) Victor Flor	KO (punch)	1	1:16	

== BKFC 90 Birmingham: Tierney vs. Franco ==
BKFC 90 Birmingham: Tierney vs. Franco
- Promotion: Bare Knuckle Fighting Championship
- Date: May 30, 2026
- Venue: Utilita Arena Birmingham
- City: Birmingham, England
- Attendance: 7,492

BKFC 90 Birmingham: Tierney vs. Franco (also known as BKFC UK 16 and BKFC on DAZN 11) was a bare-knuckle fighting event held by Bare Knuckle Fighting Championship on May 30, 2026.

=== Background ===
An interim BKFC Welterweight Championship bout between BKFC UK Welterweight Champion Connor Tierney and BKFC Europe Welterweight Champion Rico Franco headlined the event. They previously met at "Bare Knuckle Boxing 16" in March 2019 where Franco won by round one knockout.

A light heavyweight bout between former UFC Welterweight Championship challenger and promotional newcomer Darren Till and Aaron Chalmers also took place at the event.

=== Bonus awards ===
The following fighters were awarded bonuses:

- Fight of the Night: George Thorpe vs. Leigh Cohoon
- Knockout of the Night: Rico Franco

=== Fight card ===
BKFC 90 Birmingham: Tierney vs. Franco
Weight Class				Method	Round	Time	Notes
Welterweight 75 kg	(United Kingdom) Rico Franco	def.	(United Kingdom) Connor Tierney	KO	2	1:18	For the interim BKFC Welterweight Championship
Light Heavyweight 84 kg	(United Kingdom) Darren Till	def.	(United Kingdom) Aaron Chalmers	TKO (punches)	2	0:22	
Cruiserweight 93 kg	(United Kingdom) John Phillips	def.	(United Kingdom) Ryan Barrett	KO	1	1:03	
Bantamweight 61 kg	(United Kingdom) Brian Hyslop	def.	(United Kingdom) Jonno Chipchase	Decision (unanimous) (50-43, 50-43, 49-45)	5	2:00	
Middleweight 79 kg	(United Kingdom) George Thorpe	def.	(United Kingdom) Leigh Cohoon	Decision (unanimous) (49-46, 49-46, 50-45)	5	2:00	
Featherweight 66 kg	(Poland) Michal Lesniak	def.	(United Kingdom) Martin McDonough	TKO	4	0:57	
Middleweight 79 kg	(United Kingdom) Liam Hutchinson	def.	(United Kingdom) Simeon Ottley	Decision (unanimous) (50-45, 50-45, 48-47)	5	2:00	
Middleweight 79 kg	(United Kingdom) Paul O'Sullivan	def.	(United Kingdom) Paul Hilz	Decision (unanimous) (50-45, 50-45, 50-45)	5	2:00	
Lightweight 70 kg	(United Kingdom) Tommy Hawthorn	def.	(United Kingdom) Will Smith	TKO	3	1:42	
Welterweight 75 kg	(United Kingdom) Kris Trezise	def.	(United Kingdom) Luke Brassfield	TKO	4	1:53	
Preliminary Card
Heavyweight 120 kg	(Poland) Lucasz Parobiec	def.	(United Kingdom) Kaseem Saleem	TKO	4	0:47	
Lightweight 70 kg	(United Kingdom) Nathan Leeson	def.	(United Kingdom) Stevie Devenport	TKO	3	1:29	

== BKFC Fight Night Hollywood: Lane vs. Henry ==
BKFC Fight Night Hollywood: Lane vs. Henry
- Promotion: Bare Knuckle Fighting Championship
- Date: June 4, 2026
- Venue: Seminole Hard Rock Hotel & Casino Hollywood
- City: Hollywood, Florida, United States

BKFC Fight Night Hollywood: Lane vs. Henry (also known as BKFC Fight Night 39) was a bare-knuckle fighting event held by Bare Knuckle Fighting Championship on June 4, 2026.

=== Background ===
A welterweight bout between former BKFC Welterweight Champion Julian Lane and undefeated contender Bryce Henry is scheduled to headline the event.

=== Bonus awards ===
The following fighters were awarded bonuses:

- Fight of the Night: Gorjan Slaveski vs. Jonny Tello and Leonardo Acanda vs. James Rodriguez
- Knockout of the Night: Julio Perez Rodriguez

=== Fight card ===
BKFC Fight Night Hollywood: Lane vs. Henry
Weight Class				Method	Round	Time	Notes
Welterweight 75 kg	(United States) Bryce Henry	def.	(United States) Julian Lane	DQ (illegal takedown)	4	0:35	
Welterweight 75 kg	(North Macedonia) Gorjan Slaveski	def.	(United States) Jonny Tello	Decision (unanimous) (47-46, 47-46, 48-45)	5	2:00	
Cruiserweight 93 kg	(United States) Mike Jones	def.	(United States) Stephen Townsel	KO	1	0:56	
Bantamweight 61 kg	(United States) Gee Perez	def.	(United States) Mike Hansen	KO	1	0:44	
Flyweight 57 kg	(Cuba) Gustavo Balart	def.	(United States) Alexander Gutierrez	Decision (split) (49-46, 49-46, 47-48)	5	2:00	
Featherweight 66 kg	(United States) Peter Peraza	def.	(United States) Ashton Caniglia	TKO	2	1:46	
Cruiserweight 93 kg	(Cuba) Julio Perez Rodriguez	def.	(United States) Lamont Stafford	KO	1	0:44	
Featherweight 66 kg	(France) Romain Courier	def.	(Cuba) Eduardo Suarez	KO	1	1:48	
Light Heavyweight 84 kg	(Cuba) Leonardo Acanda	def.	(United States) James Rodriguez	Decision (unanimous) (29-27, 29-27, 29-27)	5	2:00	
Preliminary Card
Heavyweight 120 kg	(United States) Brandon Alfano	def.	(United States) Alex Govea	KO	1	0:36	
Lightweight 70 kg	(United States) Rohan Prado	vs.	(Venezuela) Carlo Ricci	Draw (unanimous) (28-28, 28-28, 28-28)	5	2:00	
Welterweight 75 kg	(United States) Adyam Devillafuerte	def.	(United States) Brian Kleb	TKO	2	1:36	

== BKFC Fight Night Nashville: Soto vs. Deleon ==
BKFC Fight Night Nashville: Soto vs. Deleon
- Promotion: Bare Knuckle Fighting Championship
- Date: June 19, 2026
- Venue: The Pinnacle
- City: Nashville, Tennessee, United States

BKFC Fight Night Nashville: Soto vs. Deleon (also known as BKFC Fight Night 40) was a bare-knuckle fighting held by Bare Knuckle Fighting Championship on June 19, 2026.

=== Background ===
A lightweight bout between former BKFC Lightweight Championship challenger Tony Soto and JC Deleon headlined the event.

=== Fight card ===
BKFC Fight Night Nashville: Soto vs. Deleon
Weight Class				Method	Round	Time	Notes
Lightweight 70 kg	(United States) JC Deleon	def.	(United States) Tony Soto	TKO	3	2:00	
Featherweight 66 kg	(United States) Tray Martin	def.	(United States) Nathan Rivera	Decision (unanimous) (10-9, 10-9, 10-9) (overtime round)	6	2:00	The first five rounds went to a draw.
Lightweight 70 kg	(United States) Bobby Taylor	def.	(United States) Angel Hernandez	TKO	2	0:58	
Heavyweight 120 kg	(United States) Prince McLean	def.	(United States) Jeramy Karshner	TKO	1	1:48	
Lightweight 70 kg	(United States) Cole Ferrell	def.	(United States) Anthony Foye	TKO	5	0:38	
Light Heavyweight 84 kg	(United States) Ravon Baxter	def.	(United States) Junior Hicks	TKO	1	1:33	
Welterweight 75 kg	(United States) Caleb Harvey	def.	(United States) Joshua Whiteside	Decision (unanimous) (30-27, 30-27, 30-27)	5	2:00	
Preliminary Card
Light Heavyweight 84 kg	(United States) Zach Russ	def.	(United States) Kelvin Rayford	TKO	1	0:45	
Bantamweight 61 kg	(United States) Payton Hayes	def.	(United States) Julian Valencia	KO	1	1:41	
Bantamweight 61 kg	(United States) Joby Steffensmeier	def.	(United States) Robert Fichtner	Decision (split) (29-28, 29-28, 28-29)	5	2:00	

== BKFC Fight Night Hammond: VanCamp vs. Cisneros ==
BKFC Fight Night Hammond: VanCamp vs. Cisneros
- Promotion: Bare Knuckle Fighting Championship
- Date: June 26, 2026
- Venue: Horseshoe Hammond
- City: Hammond, Indiana, United States

BKFC Fight Night Hammond: VanCamp vs. Cisneros (also known as BKFC Fight Night 41) was a bare-knuckle fighting event held by Bare Knuckle Fighting Championship on June 26, 2026.

=== Background ===
A welterweight bout between Cameron VanCamp and Gregoris Cisneros headlined the event.

=== Fight card ===
BKFC Fight Night Hammond: VanCamp vs. Cisneros
Weight Class				Method	Round	Time	Notes
Welterweight 75 kg	(United States) Gregoris Cisneros	def.	(United States) Cameron Vancamp	KO	1	1:49	
Heavyweight 120 kg	(United States) Arnold Adams	def.	(United States) Steve Banks	KO	2	1:21	
Light Heavyweight 84 kg	(United States) Brandon Conley	def.	(United States) Aubrey Mendonca	TKO	1	1:41	
Heavyweight 120 kg	(United States) Gabriel Mota	NC	(United States) Alex Davis	NC (No Contest)	1	1:23	
Bantamweight 61 kg	(United States) Justin Street	def.	(United States) Ronny Hauser	TKO	4	1:46	
Light Heavyweight 84 kg	(United States) Thomas Angeloff	def.	(United States) Jojo Schillizzi	TKO	1	1:07	
Featherweight 66 kg	(United States) Stevo Morris	def.	(United States) Brandon Meneses	Decision (split) (49-46, 47-48, 48-47)	5	2:00	
Welterweight 75 kg	(United States) Martez McGregor	def.	(United States) Casey Moses	KO	3	0:40	
Preliminary Card
Cruiserweight 93 kg	(United States) Branko Busick	def.	(United States) Anthony Mendoza	KO	1	0:24	
W.Strawweight 52 kg	(Canada) Alexandra Delgado-Lopez	def.	(United States) Natalie Gage	Decision (unanimous) (30-27, 30-27, 30-27)	3	2:00	
Welterweight 75 kg	(United States) Anthony Pike	def.	(United States) Travis Smith	TKO	1	1:33	

== BKFC Liberty Brawl ==
BKFC Liberty Brawl
- Promotion: Bare Knuckle Fighting Championship
- Date: July 3, 2026
- Venue: Xfinity Mobile Arena
- City: Philadelphia, Pennsylvania, United States

BKFC Liberty Brawl was a bare-knuckle fighting event held by Bare Knuckle Fighting Championship on July 3, 2026.

=== Background ===
The event was a celebration of the 250th year anniversary of the United States.

A lightweight bout for the vacant BKFC Lightweight Championship between former BKFC Welterweight Champion Austin Trout (also former WBA light middleweight champion) and interim champion Ben Bonner headlined the event. Also, a BKFC Women's Strawweight Championship bout between current champion Britain Hart and Sarah Shell also took place at the event.

=== Bonus awards ===
The following fighters were awarded bonuses:

- Fight of the Night: Cody Russell vs. Jake Bostwick
- Performance of the Night: Ben Bonner, Zedekiah Montanez, Matthew Turnbull, Lex Ludlow and Anthony Pagan

=== Fight card ===
BKFC Liberty Brawl
Weight Class				Method	Round	Time	Notes
Lightweight 70 kg	(United Kingdom) Ben Bonner	def.	(United States) Austin Trout	KO	2	0:30	For the vacant BKFC Lightweight Championship.
W.Strawweight 52 kg	(United States) Britain Hart	def.	(United States) Sarah Shell	Decision (split) (48-47, 48-47, 47-48)	5	2:00	For the BKFC Women's Strawweight Championship.
Middleweight 79 kg	(United States) John Garbarino	def.	(United States) Mike Richman	Decision (unanimous) (50-44, 50-44, 48-46)	5	2:00	
Middleweight 79 kg	(United States) Cody Russell	def.	(United Kingdom) Jake Bostwick	Decision (unanimous)	6	2:00	Overtime round
Lightweight 70 kg	(United States) Zedekiah Montanez	def.	(United States) Matt Maestas	TKO	1	1:39	
Lightweight 70 kg	(United States) Matthew Turnbull	def.	(United States) Brandon Honsvick	TKO	1	1:49	
Cruiserweight 93 kg	(United States) Lex Ludlow	def.	(United States) Drew Nolan	KO	1	0:09	
Preliminary Card
Welterweight 75 kg	(United States) Anthony Pagan	def.	(United States) Zach Pannell	Decision (unanimous) (10-7)	1	2:00	First-ever BKFC One-Round War.
Welterweight 75 kg	(United States) Pat Sullivan	def.	(United States) Ruben Arroyo	TKO	1	1:33	
Light Heavyweight 84 kg	(United States) Nicholas Willey	def.	(United States) Eric Westbury	Decision (split) (30-27, 29-28, 28-29)	5	2:00	
Welterweight 75 kg	(United States) Maxiono Griffin	def.	(United States) Billy Graves	TKO	3	1:02	

== BKFC 91 Naples: Hunt vs. Pugliesi ==
BKFC 91 Naples: Hunt vs. Pugliesi
- Promotion: Bare Knuckle Fighting Championship
- Date: July 18, 2026
- Venue: Arena Flegrea
- City: Naples, Italy

BKFC 91 Naples: Hunt vs. Pugliesi was a bare-knuckle fighting event held by Bare Knuckle Fighting Championship on July 18, 2026.

=== Background ===
A bout between current BKFC Light Heavyweight World Champion (also former Cruiserweight World Champion) Lorenzo Hunt and undefeated prospect Walter Pugliesi for the inaugural Ironweight Championship headlined the event.

A bout between undefeated contender Tomas Melis and Toni Estorer for the inaugural BKFC Europe Light Heavyweight Championship took place at the event.

A bout between Ernesto Papa and Jindrich Byrtus for the inaugural BKFC Europe Cruiserweight Championship also took place at the event.

=== Fight card ===
BKFC 91 Naples: Hunt vs. Pugliesi
Weight Class				Method	Round	Time	Notes
Ironweight 102 kg	(United States) Lorenzo Hunt	def.	(Italy) Walter Pugliesi	KO	4	1:09	For the inaugural BKFC Ironweight Championship
Cruiserweight 93 kg	(Czech Republic) Jindrich Byrtus	def.	(Italy) Ernesto Papa	TKO	2	2:00	For the inaugural BKFC Europe Cruiserweight Championship
Light Heavyweight 84 kg	(Slovakia) Tomas Melis	def.	(Germany) Toni Estorer	TKO	2	0:25	For the inaugural BKFC Europe Light Heavyweight Championship
Middleweight 79 kg	(United Kingdom) Danny Christie	vs.	(Italy) Enzo Tobbia	NC (illegal headlock)	2	0:27	
Lightweight 70 kg	(Republic of Ireland) Jimmy Sweeney	def.	(Italy) Nicholas Vescio	TKO	2	0:22	
Light Heavyweight 84 kg	(Italy) Leonardo Damiani	def.	(Italy) Andrea Bicchi	TKO	3	2:00	
Featherweight 66 kg	(United Kingdom) Dan Chapman	def.	(Italy) Marco Giustarini	KO	2	0:08	
Cruiserweight 93 kg	(Austria) Arbi Chakaev	def.	(Czech Republic) Dominik Herold	TKO	1	0:44	
Light Heavyweight 84 kg	(Italy) Gianni Melillo	def.	(United Kingdom) Dawid Chylinski	TKO	2	0:47	
Light Heavyweight 84 kg	(Poland) Pawel Werszynin	def.	(Italy) Ramy Elsayes	KO	1	1:04	
Preliminary Card
Lightweight 70 kg	(Italy) Cristian Sabbatini	def.	(Germany) Charli Marta	Decision (unanimous) (29-27, 29-27, 30-27)	5	2:00	
Middleweight 79 kg	(Italy) Cristian Brinzan	def.	(Italy) Marco Saccaro	KO	1	1:12	
Featherweight 66 kg	(Italy) Guglielmo Gicco	def.	(Italy) Antonio Moscatiello	Decision (unanimous) (29-28, 29-28, 30-27)	5	2:00	

== BKFC Fight Night Uruguay: Reyno vs. Krejci ==
BKFC Fight Night Uruguay: Reyno vs. Krejci
- Promotion: Bare Knuckle Fighting Championship
- Date: July 25, 2026
- Venue: Antel Arena
- City: Montevideo, Uruguay

BKFC Fight Night Uruguay: Reyno vs. Krejci (also known as BKFC Fight Night 42) was a bare-knuckle fighting event held by Bare Knuckle Fighting Championship on July 25, 2026.

=== Background ===
A bantamweight bout between undefeated contender Gaston Reyno and Josh Krejki headlined the event. The bout was originally scheduled to be Reyno vs. Paris Boyd but the bout was changed for undisclosed reasons.

=== Fight card ===
BKFC Fight Night Uruguay: Reyno vs. Krejci
Weight Class				Method	Round	Time	Notes
Lightweight 70 kg	(Uruguay) Gaston Reyno	def.	(United States) Josh Krejci	TKO	1	1:29	
Featherweight 66 kg	(Argentina) Guido Cannetti	def.	(Brazil) Emiliano Nielli	Decision (unanimous)	5	2:00	Judges' scorecards not read.
Heavyweight 120 kg	(Mexico) Javier Torres	def.	(Argentina) Luis Jimenez	Decision (unanimous)	5	2:00	Judges' scorecards not read.
W.Bantamweight 61 kg	(Uruguay) Marilyn Contin	def.	(Argentina) Gisela Luna	TKO	1	1:13	
Featherweight 66 kg	(Argentina) Nicolas Jara	def.	(Chile) Ramon Mascarena	Decision (unanimous)	5	2:00	Judges' scorecards not read.
Featherweight 66 kg	(Uruguay) Nicolas Mujica	def.	(Argentina) Gonzalo Diaz Arredondo	Decision (unanimous)	5	2:00	Judges' scorecards not read.
Light Heavyweight 84 kg	(Argentina) Harel Nicodella	def.	(Uruguay) Franco Perochena	TKO	3	0:48	
W.Flyweight 57 kg	(Chile) Jacqueline Ayala	def.	(Argentina) Giuliana Cosnard	Decision (split)	5	2:00	Judges' scorecards not read.
Preliminary Card
Bantamweight 61 kg	(Uruguay) Nicolas Acevedo	def.	(Peru) Victor Borda	Decision (unanimous)	5	2:00	Judges' scorecards not read.
Lightweight 70 kg	(Argentina) Joel Dorado	def.	(Uruguay) Gonzalo Barrera	Decision (unanimous)	5	2:00	Judges' scorecards not read.
Welterweight 75 kg	(Argentina) Leandro Torres	def.	(Chile) Gonzalo Jara	TKO	3	1:38	

== BKFC Fight Night Newcastle: Garside vs. Taylor ==
BKFC Fight Night Newcastle: Garside vs. Taylor
- Promotion: Bare Knuckle Fighting Championship
- Date: August 1, 2026
- Venue: Walker Activity Dome
- City: Newcastle upon Tyne, England

BKFC Fight Night Newcastle: Garside vs. Taylor (also known as BKFC UK 16 and BKFC Fight Night 43) was a bare-knuckle fighting event held by Bare Knuckle Fighting Championship on August 1, 2026.

=== Background ===
A bantamweight bout between undefeated contenders Lewis Garside and Bradley Taylor for the inaugural BKFC UK Bantamweight Championship headlined the event. Also, a lightweight bout between Lewis Keen and James Lilley for the vacant BKFC UK Lightweight Championship was scheduled to take place at the event. However, it was changed to a title eliminator between Keen and Stew Martin for undisclosed reasons.

=== Fight card ===
BKFC Fight Night Newcastle: Garside vs. Taylor
Weight Class				Method	Round	Time	Notes
Bantamweight 61 kg	(United Kingdom) Bradley Taylor	def.	(United Kingdom) Lewis Garside	Decision (unanimous) (49-45, 49-45, 50-44)	5	2:00	For the inaugural UK BKFC Bantamweight Championship.
Lightweight 70 kg	(United Kingdom) Lewis Keen	def.	(United Kingdom) Stew Martin	TKO	4	1:27	BKFC Lightweight title eliminator.
Welterweight 75 kg	(United Kingdom) Dylan Fail	def.	(United Kingdom) Liam Hutchinson	Decision (unanimous) (49-45, 49-45, 49-45)	5	2:00	
Heavyweight 120 kg	(United Kingdom) James Walker	def.	(United Kingdom) Barry Boyle	Decision (unanimous) (49-46, 49-46, 50-45)	5	2:00	
Middleweight 79 kg	(United Kingdom) Mikey Nolan	def.	(United Kingdom) John Ferguson	Decision (unanimous) (50-45, 50-45, 50-45)	5	2:00	
Light Heavyweight 84 kg	(United Kingdom) Harrison Cave	Draw	(United Kingdom) Danny Moir	Draw (47-47, 47-47, 47-47)	5	2:00	
Welterweight 75 kg	(United Kingdom) KJ Metcalfe	def.	(United Kingdom) Owen Webster	TKO	3	1:36	
Bantamweight 61 kg	(United Kingdom) Cory Chapman	def.	(United Kingdom) Jack Blair	TKO	2	1:59	
Preliminary Card
Light Heavyweight 84 kg	(United Kingdom) Harry Bray	def.	(United Kingdom) Dylan Yendall	TKO	2	1:00	
Heavyweight 120 kg	(United Kingdom) Chris Burton	def.	(United Kingdom) Daniel Curtin	Decision (unanimous) (48-44, 48-44, 47-45)	5	2:00	
W.Flyweight 57 kg	(United Kingdom) Sally Macdonald	def.	(United Kingdom) Sandra Rees	TKO	3	1:38	

== BKFC Fight Night Sturgis: Acheson vs. Jones ==
BKFC Fight Night Sturgis: Acheson vs. Jones
- Promotion: Bare Knuckle Fighting Championship
- Date: August 8, 2026
- Venue: Buffalo Chip Campground
- City: Sturgis, South Dakota

BKFC Fight Night Sturgis: Acheson vs. Jones (also known as BKFC Fight Night 44) was a bare-knuckle fighting event that was held by Bare Knuckle Fighting Championship on August 8, 2026.

=== Background ===
A cruiserweight bout between Bryant Acheson and Mike Jones headlined the event.

=== Fight card ===
BKFC Fight Night Sturgis: Acheson vs. Jones
Weight Class				Method	Round	Time	Notes
Cruiserweight 93 kg	(United States) Bryant Acheson	def.	(United States) Mike Jones	KO	1	1:58	
Heavyweight 120 kg	(United States) Bear Hill	def.	(United States) Brady Meister	KO	3	0:52	
Middleweight 79 kg	(United States) Alonzo Martinez	def.	(United States) Zeb Vincent	KO	2	0:53	
W.Bantamweight 61 kg	(United States) Shyanna Bintliff	def.	(United States) Crystal Pittman	TKO	3	1:12	
Middleweight 79 kg	(United States) Lucas Wright	def.	(United States) Bryan McDowell	Decision (unanimous) (47-46, 48-45, 48-45)	5	2:00	
Welterweight 75 kg	(United States) Clay Collard	def.	(United States) Daniel Keepers	KO	3	1:42	
Preliminary Card
Featherweight 66 kg	(United States) Traevon Kroger	def.	(Canada) KB Dubeau-Staby	TKO (doctor stoppage)	1	2:00	
Middleweight 79 kg	(United States) Justin Walters	def.	(United States) Art Driscoll	TKO	2	1:22	
Welterweight 75 kg	(United States) Jason Simon	def.	(United States) Jason Sanderson	KO	1	0:43	

== BKFC Fight Night Mohegan Sun: Henry vs. Trinidad ==
BKFC Fight Night Mohegan Sun: Henry vs. Trinidad
- Promotion: Bare Knuckle Fighting Championship
- Date: August 21, 2026
- Venue: Mohegan Sun Arena
- City: Uncasville, Connecticut

BKFC Fight Night: Mohegan Sun (also known as BKFC Fight Night 45) was a bare-knuckle fighting event held by Bare Knuckle Fighting Championship on August 21, 2026.

=== Background ===
A welterweight bout between undefeated contender Bryce Henry and Carlos Trinidad headlined the event.

Two bouts were removed from the card for undisclosed reasons:

- A welterweight bout between Isaiah Williams and Nate Larocco.
- A lightweight bout between Nate Ghareeb and Nash Diederichs.

=== Fight card ===
BKFC Fight Night Mohegan Sun: Henry vs. Trinidad
Weight Class				Method	Round	Time	Notes
Welterweight 75 kg	(United States) Bryce Henry	def.	(United States) Carlos Trinidad	KO	2	1:57	
Light Heavyweight 84 kg	(United States) Joseph Creer	def.	(United States) Cody Vidal	Decision (unanimous) (50-45, 50-45, 49-46)	5	2:00	
Featherweight 66 kg	(United States) Joey Gambino	def.	(South Africa) Tommy Strydom	TKO	2	0:23	
Bantamweight 61 kg	(United States) Lardy Navarro	def.	(United States) Robert Fichtner	TKO	2	0:31	
Featherweight 66 kg	(United States) Kris Moutinho	def.	(United States) Michael Hernandez	TKO	3	0:52	
Light Heavyweight 84 kg	(United States) Chris Perreault	def.	(United States) Joe Powers	TKO	1	0:37	
Lightweight 70 kg	(United States) Matt Denning	def.	(United States) Brandon Bushaw	TKO	4	1:34	
Preliminary Card
W.Bantamweight 61 kg	(United States) Sophia Hayes	def.	(United States) Alexandra Ballou	TKO	2	1:05	
Bantamweight 61 kg	(United States) Dominick Carey	def.	(United States) Jared Lennon	KO	1	0:21	

== BKFC 92 Boston: Stewart vs. Gigliotti ==
BKFC 92 Boston: Stewart vs. Gigliotti
- Promotion: Bare Knuckle Fighting Championship
- Date: August 29, 2026
- Venue: Fenway Park
- City: Boston, Massachusetts

BKFC 92 Boston: Stewart vs. Gigliotti was a bare-knuckle fighting event held by Bare Knuckle Fighting Championship on August 29, 2026.

=== Background ===
A BKFC Featherweight Championship bout between current undefeated champion Kai Stewart and Harry Gigliotti headlined the event.

Also, a women's bantamweight bout for the 'Queen of Violence Championship' title between champion Christine Ferea (also BKFC Women's Flyweight Champion) and Sofia Landi served as the co-main event.

A bantamweight bout between Daniel Pettit and Shane Jordan was removed from the card for undisclosed reasons.

=== Bonus awards ===
The following fighters were awarded bonuses:

- Knockout of the Night: Guilherme Viana, James Murrin and David Simpson

=== Fight card ===
BKFC 92 Boston: Stewart vs. Gigliotti
Weight Class				Method	Round	Time	Notes
Featherweight 66 kg	(United States) Kai Stewart (c)	def.	(United States) Harry Gigliotti	Decision (unanimous) (49-46, 48-47, 48-47)	5	2:00	For the BKFC Featherweight Championship.
W.Bantamweight 61 kg	(United States) Christine Ferea (c)	def.	(Argentina) Sofia Landi	KO (punches)	2	0:33	For the symbolic Queen of Violence Championship.
Welterweight 75 kg	(United States) Joe Lauzon	def.	(United States) Stash Kuykendall	TKO (punches)	2	0:49	
Lightweight 70 kg	(United States) Peter Barrett	def.	(United States) Elijah Harris	TKO (referee stoppage)	3	0:57	
Featherweight 66 kg	(United States) Tray Martin	def.	(United States) Rico Disciullo	KO (punch)	4	1:21	
Lightweight 70 kg	(United States) Charon Spain	def.	(United States) Charles Rosa	Decision (split) (45-48, 47-45, 47-46)	5	2:00	
Middleweight 79 kg	(United States) Dallas Davison	def.	(United States) Pat Casey	KO (punch)	2	0:59	
W.Strawweight 52 kg	(United States) Taylor Starling	def.	(United States) Kat Paprocki	Decision (unanimous) (29-28, 29-28, 29-28)	3	2:00	
Ironweight 102 kg	(Brazil) Guilherme Viana	def.	(United States) Robinson Perez	TKO (punches)	1	1:04	
Preliminary Card
Featherweight 66 kg	(United States) James Murrin	def.	(United States) Chris Rooney	KO (punch)	1	0:35	
Featherweight 66 kg	(United States) Jake Pilla	def.	(United States) Angelo Colon	TKO (punches)	2	1:07	
Light Heavyweight 84 kg	(United States) David Simpson	def.	(United States) David Burke	KO (punch)	1	0:27	

== BKFC 93 Hollywood: Perdomo vs. Hill ==
BKFC 93 Hollywood: Perdomo vs. Hill
- Promotion: Bare Knuckle Fighting Championship
- Date: September 11, 2026
- Venue: Seminole Hard Rock Hotel & Casino Hollywood
- City: Hollywood, Florida

BKFC 93 Hollywood: Perdomo vs. Hill was a bare-knuckle fighting event held by Bare Knuckle Fighting Championship on September 11, 2026.

=== Background ===
A heavyweight bout between current undefeated contender Leonardo Perdomo and Anthony Garrett was scheduled to headline the event. Due to health reasons, Garrett withdrew and was replaced by Bear Hill.

=== Bonus awards ===
The following fighters were awarded bonuses:

- Fight of the Night: Ernesto Suarez vs. Ronny Hauser
- Performance of the Night: Esteban Rodriguez and Andrew Strode
- Knockout of the Night: Leonardo Perdomo

=== Fight card ===
BKFC 93 Hollywood: Perdomo vs. Hill
Weight Class				Method	Round	Time	Notes
Heavyweight 120 kg	(Cuba) Leonardo Perdomo	def.	(United States) Bear Hill	TKO	1	0:14	
Featherweight 66 kg	(United States) Bryan Duran	def.	(United States) Charles Bennett	Decision (unanimous) (48-44, 48-44, 48-44)	5	2:00	
Bantamweight 61 kg	(United States) Andrew Strode	def.	(United States) Gee Perez	TKO	3	1:59	BKFC Bantamweight title eliminator
Ironweight 102 kg	(United States) Esteban Rodriguez	def.	(United States) Stephen Townsel	TKO	1	0:46	
Bantamweight 61 kg	(United States) Matt Russo	def.	(United States) Jancarlos Rivera	TKO	4	1:36	
Welterweight 75 kg	(Turkey) Murat Kazgan	def.	(United States) James Rodriguez	KO	1	1:31	
Bantamweight 61 kg	(United States) Ernesto Suarez	def.	(United States) Ronny Hauser	Decision (split) (47-46, 46-47, 49-45)	5	2:00	
Flyweight 57 kg	(United States) Tyler Randall	def.	(United States) Chris Garcia	Decision (majority) (48-46, 48-46, 47-47)	5	2:00	
Preliminary Card
Ironweight 102 kg	(United States) Chino Blume	def.	(United States) Caleb Joseph Avila	Decision (unanimous) (30-27, 30-27, 30-27)	3	2:00	
Lightweight 70 kg	(United States) Adyam Devillafuerte	def.	(United States) Miguel Hinojosa	KO	1	1:54	
Featherweight 66 kg	(Cuba) Eduardo Suarez	def.	(United States) Jose Davila	TKO	2	0:34	

== BKFC 94 Manchester: Till vs. Romero ==
BKFC 94 Manchester: Till vs. Romero
- Promotion: Bare Knuckle Fighting Championship
- Date: September 26, 2026
- Venue: Manchester Arena
- City: Manchester, England

BKFC 94 Manchester: Till vs. Romero (also known as BKFC UK 17 and BKFC on DAZN 12) is an upcoming bare-knuckle fighting event to be held by Bare Knuckle Fighting Championship on September 26, 2026.

=== Background ===
A cruiserweight bout between former UFC Welterweight Championship challenger Darren Till and UFC Middleweight Championship challenger Yoel Romero is scheduled to headline the event.

Three championship bouts are scheduled for the event:

- A BKFC Middleweight Championship bout between champion David Mundell and Jack Cullen.
- A BKFC UK Middleweight Championship bout for the inaugural title between Gaz Corran and Mac Bygraves.
- A BKFC Cruiserweight Championship bout between champion Karl Thompson and Anthony Thornton.

=== Fight card ===
BKFC 94 Manchester: Till vs. Romero
Weight Class				Method	Round	Time	Notes
Cruiserweight 93 kg	(United Kingdom) Darren Till	def.	(Cuba) Yoel Romero	Decision (unanimous)	5	2:00	
Middleweight 79 kg	(United Kingdom) Jack Cullen	def.	(United States) David Mundell (c)	Decision (Split)	6	2:00	For the BKFC Middleweight Championship.
Middleweight 79 kg	(United Kingdom) Gaz Corran	def.	(United Kingdom) Mac Bygraves	TKO	3	0:26	For the inaugural BKFC UK Middleweight Championship.
Cruiserweight 93 kg	(United Kingdom) Karl Thompson (c)	def.	(United Kingdom) Anthony Thornton	Decision (unanimous)	5	2:00	For the BKFC UK Cruiserweight Championship.
Middleweight 79 kg	(United Kingdom) Joe Lister	def.	(United Kingdom) Harry Bray	TKO	2	1:58	
Welterweight 75 kg	(United Kingdom) Mikey Henderson	def.	(United Kingdom) Matthew Wiwczaryk	TKO	1	2:00	
Featherweight 66 kg	(United Kingdom) Stew Martin	def.	(United Kingdom) Joshy Williams	TKO	2	2:00	
Welterweight 75 kg	(Poland) Bartlomiej Król	def.	(United Kingdom) Luke Vaughan	TKO	1	0:55	
Middleweight 79 kg	(United Kingdom) Leigh Cohoon	def.	(United Kingdom) Ste Wallwork	TKO	2	2:00	
Preliminary Card
Middleweight 79 kg	(United Kingdom) Benjamin Lowe	def.	(United Kingdom) Dan McGraffin	TKO	1	1:42	
Welterweight 75 kg	(United Kingdom) Tyrone Hamer	def.	(United Kingdom) Liam Dooley	KO	3	1:59	
Welterweight 75 kg	(United Kingdom) Luke Bassnett	def.	(United Kingdom) Darren Willans	KO	2	1:57	

== BKFC Fight Night Australia: Kuhne vs. Curran ==
BKFC Fight Night Australia: Kuhne vs. Curran
- Promotion: Bare Knuckle Fighting Championship
- Date: October 3, 2026
- Venue: Eatons Hills Hotel
- City: Queensland, Australia

BKFC Fight Night Australia: Kuhne vs. Curran (also known as BKFC Fight Night 46) was a bare-knuckle fighting event that was held by Bare Knuckle Fighting Championship on October 3, 2026.

=== Background ===
This event marked the promotion's second event in Australia since BKFC Fight Night 37 in April 2026 and first in Queensland.

A heavyweight bout between Haze Hepi and Sam Shewmaker was originally scheduled to headline the event. However, the bout was removed due to travel issues on Shewmaker's part. Josh Kuhne and Elaiah Bishop were scheduled to compete in a welterweight bout and Brentin Mumford and Shaun Curran were scheduled to comepte, but Bishop withdrew and Mumford withdrew respectfully. A bout between Kuhne and Curran was then elevated to the main event.

=== Fight card ===
BKFC Fight Night Australia: Kuhne vs. Curran
Weight Class				Method	Round	Time	Notes
Welterweight 75 kg	(Australia) Josh Kuhne	def.	(Australia) Shaun Curran	TKO	1	0:58	
Heavyweight 120 kg	(Australia) Mark Flanagan	def.	(New Zealand) Kaylib Heke	KO	2	0:43	
Middleweight 79 kg	(Australia) Santo Joma	def.	(Australia) Viktor Lyall	TKO	2	1:26	
Lightweight 70 kg	(Australia) Mick Whitehead	def.	(Australia) Ryan Winnett	TKO	4	0:50	
Middleweight 79 kg	(Australia) Mario Loga	def.	(New Zealand) Alvin Kanehaiua	KO	1	0:47	
Preliminary Card
Featherweight 66 kg	(Australia) Hunter Ioane	def.	(United States) Nicholas Saragosa	TKO	1	1:59	
Heavyweight 120 kg	(Australia) Mel Tolone	def.	(Australia) Ricky Rowles-Brown	KO	1	0:41	
Welterweight 75 kg	(Australia) Timothy Randal	def.	(Australia) Ahmad Muhtaseb	KO	1	1:12	

== BKFC Fight Night Bethlehem: Cisneros vs. Petersen ==
BKFC Fight Night Betheleham: Cisneros vs. Petersen
- Promotion: Bare Knuckle Fighting Championship
- Date: October 9, 2026
- Venue: Wind Creek Event Center
- City: Bethlehem, Pennsylvania

BKFC Fight Night Bethlehem: Cisneros vs. Petersen (also known as BKFC Fight Night 47) was a bare-knuckle fighting event held by Bare Knuckle Fighting Championship on October 9, 2026.

=== Background ===
A welterweight bout between Gregoris Cisneros and Ryan Petersen headlined the event.

A cruiserweight bout between Lex Ludlow and Brock Walker was scheduled, but Walker withdrew and was replaced by Sean Schultz.

=== Fight card ===
BKFC Fight Night Betheleham: Cisneros vs. Petersen
Weight Class				Method	Round	Time	Notes
Welterweight 75 kg	(United States) Ryan Petersen	def.	(Ecuador) Gregoris Cisneros	TKO	1	1:59	
Cruiserweight 93 kg	(United States) Sean Schultz	def.	(United States) Lex Ludlow	KO	1	1:47	
Lightweight 70 kg	(United States) Antonio Castillo Jr	def.	(United States) Jay Haas	KO	2	1:45	
Middleweight 79 kg	(United States) Douglas LoBasso	def.	(United States) Justin Walters	TKO	1	1:24	
Light Heavyweight 84 kg	(United States) Mike Liberto	def.	(United States) Jojo Schillizzi	KO	1	1:59	
Bantamweight 61 kg	(United States) Travis Thompson	def.	(United States) Nick Burgos	Decision (unanimous) (49-46, 49-46, 49-46)	5	2:00	
Ironweight 102 kg	(United States) Maurice Morris	def.	(United States) Lewis Rumsey	Decision (unanimous) (50-43, 50-43, 50-43)	5	2:00	
Welterweight 75 kg	(United States) Christian Torres	def.	(United States) Brett Shoenfelt	KO	1	0:16	
Preliminary Card
Heavyweight 120 kg	(United States) Brian Newman	def.	(United States) Mark Culp	TKO	1	0:21	
W.Flyweight 57 kg	(United States) Marisol Ruelas	def.	(United States) Taylor Dagner	Decision (unanimous) (29-28, 29-28, 30-27)	5	2:00	
Heavyweight 120 kg	(United States) Nathaniel James	def.	(United States) Marc Worthington	KO	2	0:32	

== BKFC Fight Night Belgrade: Faulkner vs. Prašović ==
BKFC Fight Night Belgrade: Faulkner vs. Prašović
- Promotion: Bare Knuckle Fighting Championship
- Date: October 17, 2026 (Postponed)
- Venue: Belgrade Arena
- City: Belgrade, Serbia

BKFC Fight Night Belgrade: Faulkner vs. Prašović was a bare-knuckle fighting event to be held by Bare Knuckle Fighting Championship on October 17, 2026. However, on October 9, it was announced that the event would be postponed, with a new date to be announced and all purchased tickets to be fully refunded.

=== Background ===
A BKFC Europe Heavyweight Championship bout between current champion Agi Faulkner and Dilan Prašović was scheduled to headline the event.

=== Fight card ===
BKFC Fight Night Belgrade: Faulkner vs. Prašović
Weight Class				Method	Round	Time	Notes
Heavyweight 120 kg	(United Kingdom) Agi Faulkner (c)	vs.	(Montenegro) Dilan Prašović				For the BKFC Europe Heavyweight Championship.
Middleweight 79 kg	(Serbia) Aleksandar Konovalov	vs.	(United States) Eddy Ruiz				
Middleweight 79 kg	(Serbia) Stefan Dobrijevic	vs.	(Serbia) Stefan Negucic				
Featherweight 66 kg	(Montenegro) Dejan Zlatičanin	vs.	(Germany) Said Akhyadov				
Welterweight 75 kg	(Russia) Vladislav Tuinov	vs.	(Montenegro) Alfred Koci				
Heavyweight 120 kg	(Croatia) Agron Smakici	vs.	(Hungary) Istvan Bernath				
W.Featherweight 66 kg	(Hungary) Sheena Bathory	vs.	(Italy) Sara Bitto				
Welterweight 75 kg	(Serbia) Dusan Radovic	vs.	(Brazil) Felipe Maia				
Middleweight 79 kg	(Slovakia) Strahinja Karabegovic	vs.	(Serbia) Brajan Jovanovic				
Lightweight 70 kg	(Slovakia) Miroslav Pittner	vs.	(Bulgaria) Slavi Haralambov				
Welterweight 75 kg	(Serbia) Danilo Kalicanin	vs.	(North Macedonia) Roberto Ackovski				

== BKFC 95 Newark: Herring vs. Dodson ==
BKFC 95 Newark: Herring vs. Dodson
- Promotion: Bare Knuckle Fighting Championship
- Date: October 17, 2026
- Venue: Prudential Center
- City: Newark, New Jersey
- Attendance: 8,392

BKFC 95 Newark: Herring vs. Dodson is an upcoming bare-knuckle fighting event to be held by Bare Knuckle Fighting Championship on October 17, 2026.

=== Background ===
A BKFC Bantamweight Championship bout between current champion Jamel Herring and current BKFC Flyweight Champion John Dodson is scheduled to headline the event.

The following bouts were scheduled but removed for undisclosed reasons:

- A heavyweight bout between Brad Lee and Gzim Selmani
- A featherweight bout between Dom Carey and Justin Clarke

=== Bonus awards ===
The following fighters were awarded bonuses:

- Performance of the Night: Brooke Evans
- Knockout of the Night: Jimmie Rivera, Tony Soto and Cole Cameron

=== Fight card ===
BKFC 95 Newark: Herring vs. Dodson
Weight Class				Method	Round	Time	Notes
Bantamweight 61 kg	(United States) Jamel Herring (c)	def.	(United States) John Dodson	Decision (split) (46-49, 48-47, 49-46)	5	2:00	For the BKFC Bantamweight Championship.
Welterweight 75 kg	(United States) Jimmie Rivera	def.	(United States) Brandon Meyer	KO	4	0:46	
Lightweight 70 kg	(United States) Tony Soto	def.	(United States) Anthony Pike	KO	2	0:40	
Flyweight 57 kg	(United States) Santo Curatolo	def.	(United States) Anthony Yost	KO	2	0:37	
Lightweight 70 kg	(United States) Dalvin Blair	def.	(United States) Paris Boyd	KO	1	1:22	
Middleweight 79 kg	(United States) Noah Geathoun	vs.	(United States) Dustin Bailey	Draw (unanimous) (28-28, 28-28, 28-28)	3	2:00	
Featherweight 66 kg	(United States) Cole Cameron	def.	(United States) Phil Caracappa	KO	1	1:44	
Preliminary Card
Welterweight 75 kg	(United States) Mike Medrano	def.	(United States) Rob Emerson	Decision (split) (30-27, 27-30, 29-28)	3	2:00	
Lightweight 70 kg	(United States) Dylan Pitt	def.	(United States) Nicholas Sarasoga	TKO	1	0:52	
W.Flyweight 57 kg	(United States) Brooke Evans	def.	(United States) Gabrielle Roman	TKO	2	1:59	

== BKFC Fight Night Clearwater: Reber vs. Street ==
BKFC Fight Night Clearwater: Reber vs. Street
- Promotion: Bare Knuckle Fighting Championship
- Date: October 23, 2026
- Venue: OCC Road House
- City: Clearwater, Florida

BKFC Fight Night Clearwater: Reber vs. Street (also known as BKFC Fight Night 48) was a bare-knuckle fighting event held by Bare Knuckle Fighting Championship on October 23, 2026.

=== Background ===
A bantamweight bout between former BKFC Bantamweight Championship challenger Ryan Reber and Justin Street headlined the event.

A light heavyweight bout between Jared Warren and Thomas Angeloff was removed for undisclosed reasons. In addition, a middleweight bout between Tony Murphy and Brandon Conley was scheduled for the event, but Conley withdrew for undisclosed reasons and was replaced by Doug Coltrane.

Three other bouts were scheduled and were removed for undisclosed reasons:

- A women's strawweight bout between Crystal Van Wyk and Noelia Vasallo
- A middleweight bout between Terryl Johnson and Frankie Solomon Jr.
- A lightweight bout between Gabriel Freyre and Jason Dinunzio

=== Fight card ===
BKFC Fight Night Clearwater: Reber vs. Street
Weight Class				Method	Round	Time	Notes
Bantamweight 61 kg	(United States) Ryan Reber	def.	(United States) Justin Street	Decision (unanimous) (49-46, 48-46, 48-47)	5	2:00	
Bantamweight 61 kg	(United States) Michael Larrimore	def.	(United States) Nate Morrow	KO	2	1:31	
Middleweight 79 kg	(United States) Doug Coltrane	def.	(United States) Tony Murphy	KO	2	0:53	
Welterweight 75 kg	(United States) Rickie McConnico	def.	(United States) Mike Heckert	TKO	3	0:47	
Flyweight 57 kg	(United States) Chachi Versace	def.	(United States) Angelo Trujillo	Decision (majority) (48-46, 48-46, 47-47)	5	2:00	
Preliminary Card
Bantamweight 61 kg	(United States) Danny Korbel	def.	(United States) Jadon Dee	KO	2	2:00	
Light Heavyweight 84 kg	(United States) Sam Delao	def.	(United States) Chris Keirn	Decision (unanimous) (30-27, 30-27, 29-28)	3	2:00	
Middleweight 79 kg	(United States) Tyler Baker	def.	(United States) Yari Kaganovsky	TKO	1	0:43	

== BKFC 96 Glasgow: Cooke vs. Weir ==
BKFC 96 Glasgow: Cooke vs. Weir
- Promotion: Bare Knuckle Fighting Championship
- Date: November 7, 2026
- Venue: OVO Hydro
- City: Glasgow, Scotland

BKFC 96 Glasgow: Cooke vs. Weir (also known as BKFC UK 18) was a bare-knuckle fighting event held by Bare Knuckle Fighting Championship on November 7, 2026.

=== Background ===
This event marked the promotional debut in Scotland.

A BKFC UK Light Heavyweight Championship bout between current champion Conor Cooke and Sean Weir headlined the event.

Rob Cunningham and Gzim Selmani were scheduled to compete, but Cunningham withdrew and was replaced by Reece Heer.

Two bouts were scheduled but were removed for undisclosed reasons:

- A bantamweight bout between Cory Chapman and Lewis Dixon
- A middleweight bout between Barry Aikman and Cory Hardy

=== Bonus awards ===
The following fighters were awarded bonuses:

- Fight of the Night: Scott Malone vs. Kieron Sewell
- Performance of the Night: Danny Christie
- Knockout of the Night: Cory Chapman and Barry Boyle

=== Fight card ===
BKFC 96 Glasgow: Cooke vs. Weir
Weight Class				Method	Round	Time	Notes
Light Heavyweight 84 kg	(United Kingdom) Sean Weir	def.	(United Kingdom) Conor Cooke (c)	TKO	1	1:41	Wins vacant BKFC UK Light Heavyweight Championship.
Middleweight 79 kg	(United Kingdom) Danny Christie	def.	(United Kingdom) Stevie Ray	TKO	2	1:59	
Heavyweight 120 kg	(Albania) Gzim Selmani	def.	(United Kingdom) Reece Heer	Decision (unanimous) (50-43, 50-43, 50-43)	5	2:00	
Bantamweight 61 kg	(United Kingdom) Scott Malone	def.	(United Kingdom) Kieron Sewell	Decision (unanimous) (10-9, 10-9, 10-9)	6	2:00	Overtime sixth round.
Heavyweight 120 kg	(United Kingdom) Barry Boyle	def.	(United Kingdom) Kaseem Saleem	KO	2	0:44	
Welterweight 75 kg	(United Kingdom) KJ Metcalfe	def.	(United Kingdom) Doalty Torrance	TKO	2	1:14	
Bantamweight 61 kg	(United Kingdom) Corey Chapman	def.	(United Kingdom) Lewis Dixon	KO	1	0:40	
Featherweight 66 kg	(United Kingdom) Dan Morel	def.	(United Kingdom) Owen Webster	TKO	4	1:17	
Preliminary Card
Featherweight 66 kg	(United Kingdom) Lewis Knox	def.	(United Kingdom) Tommy Carus	TKO	4	1:27	
Light Heavyweight 84 kg	(United Kingdom) Rhys Pagan	def.	(United Kingdom) Danny Moir	TKO	1	1:22	
Middleweight 79 kg	(United Kingdom) Charlie Thomson	def.	(United Kingdom) Ian Mulroy	TKO	4	1:26	

== BKFC Fight Night Myrtle Beach: Richardson vs. Oxendine ==
BKFC Fight Night Myrtle Beach: Richardson vs. Oxendine
- Promotion: Bare Knuckle Fighting Championship
- Date: November 20, 2026
- Venue: John T. Rhodes Myrtle Beach Sports Center
- City: Myrtle Beach, South Carolina

BKFC Fight Night Myrtle Beach: Richardson vs. Oxendine (also known as BKFC Fight Night 49) was a bare-knuckle fighting event held by Bare Knuckle Fighting Championship on November 20, 2026.

=== Background ===
A bantamweight bout between former BKFC Bantamweight Champion Keith Richardson and Joshua Oxendine headlined the event.

=== Results ===
BKFC Fight Night Myrtle Beach: Richardson vs. Oxendine
Weight Class				Method	Round	Time	Notes
Bantamweight 61 kg	(United States) Keith Richardson	def.	(United States) Joshua Oxendine	TKO (punches)	3	2:00	
Cruiserweight 93 kg	(United States) Derek Brunson	def.	(United States) Theo Doukas	KO (punches)	2	0:36	
Welterweight 75 kg	(United States) Rodney Hinton	def.	(United States) Ryan Jett	Decision (majority) (48-46, 48-46, 47-47)	5	2:00	
Featherweight 66 kg	(United States) Brandon Bushaw	def.	(United States) Joshua Claudio	TKO	4	1:02	
Bantamweight 61 kg	(Brazil) Windson Ramos	def.	(United States) Robert Fichtner	TKO	2	0:39	
Middleweight 79 kg	(United States) Evan Pierce	def.	(Ecuador) Diego Romo	TKO (corner stoppage)	4	2:00	
Bantamweight 61 kg	(United States) Austin Coleman	def.	(United States) Alex Eliam	KO	1	1:30	
Preliminary Card
Featherweight 66 kg	(United States) Ashton Caniglia	def.	(United States) Amos Collins	Decision (split) (29-28, 28-29, 29-28)	3	2:00	
Light Heavyweight 84 kg	(United States) Brian Maxwell	def.	(United States) Justin Howell	Decision (unanimous) (30-27, 30-27, 29-28)	3	2:00	
Cruiserweight 93 kg	(United States) Maurice Morris	def.	(United Kingdom) Lewis Glover	Decision (unanimous) (30-27, 30-27, 30-27)	3	2:00	

== BKFC Fight Night Hershey: Pague vs. Richman ==
BKFC Fight Night Hershey: Pague vs. Richman
- Promotion: Bare Knuckle Fighting Championship
- Date: December 4, 2026
- Venue: Giant Center
- City: Hershey, Pennsylvania

BKFC Fight Night Hershey: Pague vs. Richman (also known as BKFC Fight Night 50) is an upcoming bare-knuckle fighting event to be held by Bare Knuckle Fighting Championship on December 4, 2026.

=== Background ===
A middleweight bout between Dustin Pague and former BKFC Light Heavyweight Champion Mike Richman is scheduled to headline the event.

=== Fight card ===
BKFC Fight Night Hershey: Pague vs. Richman
Weight Class				Method	Round	Time	Notes
Middleweight 79 kg	(United States) Dustin Pague	vs.	(United States) Mike Richman				
Ironweight 102 kg	(United States) Sam Alvey	vs.	(United States) Jonathan Miller				
Middleweight 79 kg	(United States) Matthew Semelsberger	vs.	(United States) Michael Manno				
Bantamweight 61 kg	(United States) Benjamin Moser	vs.	(United States) Julian Valencia				
Heavyweight 120 kg	(United States) Pat Carroll	vs.	(United States) Nelson Best				
Featherweight 66 kg	(United States) Elijah Harris	vs.	(United States) Stevo Morris				
Featherweight 66 kg	(United States) Jay Haas	vs.	(United States) Eduardo Peralta				
Bantamweight 61 kg	(United States) Hunter Starner	vs.	(United States) Blaine Shutt				
Cruiserweight 93 kg	(United States) Lex Ludlow	vs.	(United States) Mike Liberto				
Bantamweight 61 kg	(United States) Tim Yanc	vs.	(United States) Malcolm Schuyler				
Lightweight 70 kg	(United States) Zach Pannell	vs.	(United States) Zachary Shingara				
Featherweight 66 kg	(United States) Colin Reeser	vs.	(United States) Fabricio Berrun				
Heavyweight 120 kg	(United States) Brian Newman	vs.	(United States) Dale Reed				

== BKFC 97 Hollywood, FL: Henry vs. Collard ==
BKFC 97 Hollywood, FL: Henry vs. Collard
- Promotion: Bare Knuckle Fighting Championship
- Date: December 11, 2026
- Venue: Seminole Hard Rock Hotel & Casino Hollywood
- City: Hollywood, Florida

BKFC 97 Hollywood, FL: Henry vs. Collard is an upcoming bare-knuckle fighting event to be held by Bare Knuckle Fighting Championship on December 11, 2026.

=== Background ===
A welterweight bout between undefeated contender Bryce Henry and Clay Collard is scheduled to headline the event.

=== Fight card ===
BKFC 97 Hollywood, FL: Henry vs. Collard
Weight Class				Method	Round	Time	Notes
Welterweight 75 kg	(United States) Bryce Henry	vs.	(United States) Clay Collard				
Welterweight 75 kg	(North Macedonia) Gorjan Slaveski	vs.	(United States) Joe Elmore				
W.Flyweight 57 kg	(United States) Jessica Eye	vs.	(United States) Desiree Yanez				
Middleweight 79 kg	(Italy) Francesco Ricchi	vs.	(United States) Zeb Vincent				
Ironweight 102 kg	(United States) Brandon Alfano	vs.	(United States) Alex Davis				
Welterweight 75 kg	(Turkey) Murat Kazgan	vs.	(United States) Israel Rodriguez				
Lightweight 70 kg	(United States) Howard Davis	vs.	(United States) Elvin Brito				
Middleweight 79 kg	(United States) Leo Acanda	vs.	(United States) Justin Walters				
