= Dilan Prašović =

Montenegrin boxer

Personal information
- Nationality: Montenegrin
- Born: 25 December 1994 (age 31) Kotor, Montenegro
- Height: 6 ft 2 in (188 cm)
- Weight: Cruiserweight; Bridgerweight; Heavyweight

Boxing career
- Stance: Orthodox

Boxing record
- Total fights: 21
- Wins: 17
- Win by KO: 14
- Losses: 4

Dilan Prašović (born 25 December 1994) is a Montenegrin professional boxer who challenged for the WBO cruiserweight title in 2021.

== Professional career ==
After over 100 fights in the amateur ranks, Prašović made his professional debut on 25 October 2014, beating Aleksandar Petrović on points in Budva. After a 7–0 start, he earned his first title shot on 13 April 2018, stopping Máté Kristóf in the second round to claim the vacant WBO Youth cruiserweight title. He retained once – a first-round knockout (KO) of Angelo Venjakob less than two months later.

Prašović entered the top ten of the WBO rankings for the first time in April 2019 after a second-round technical knockout (TKO) victory over Juan Ezequiel Basualdo that moved him to 11–0. He ended the year with two more wins and a #3 spot in the rankings. In January 2020, the WBO ordered a final eliminator between Prašović and the #4 ranked cruiserweight Edin Puhalo, which Prašović won convincingly on 23 October to become world title challenger.

== Bare-knuckle boxing ==
Prašović made his debut with Bare Knuckle Fighting Championship against Mark Flanagan on 18 April 2026 at BKFC Fight Night 37. He won the fight by technical knockout at the end of the second round.

Prašović was scheduled to face Agi Faulkner for the BKFC Europe Heavyweight Championship in the main event on October 17, 2026 at BKFC Fight Night: Belgrade. However, the event was postponed to a to be determined date for undisclosed reasons.

== Personal life ==
In February 2020 he was honored by his hometown of Herceg Novi for his sporting achievements in the past year.

== Professional boxing record ==
| 20 fights | 17 wins | 3 losses |
|---|---|---|
| By knockout | 14 | 3 |
| By decision | 3 | 0 |

| No. | Result | Record | Opponent | Type | Round, time | Date | Location | Notes |
|---|---|---|---|---|---|---|---|---|
| 20 | Win | 17–3 | (Germany) Andreas Masold | KO | 2 (12), 1:44 | 3 Jun 2023 | Panther Gym, Cologne, Germany | For vacant WBU bridgerweight title |
| 19 | Win | 16–3 | (Czech Republic) Pavel Sour | KO | 1 (6), 1:45 | 8 Nov 2022 | Ub, Serbia | |
| 18 | Loss | 15–3 | (Russia) Alexei Papin | KO | 2 (10), 1:37 | 27 May 2022 | Avangard Ice Hockey Academy, Omsk, Russia | |
| 17 | Loss | 15–2 | (United Kingdom) Isaac Chamberlain | KO | 1 (10), 2:58 | 10 Dec 2021 | (United Kingdom) Crystal Palace National Sports Centre, London, England | For vacant IBF International cruiserweight title |
| 16 | Loss | 15–1 | (United Kingdom) Lawrence Okolie | KO | 3 (12), 1:57 | 25 Sep 2021 | (United Kingdom) Tottenham Hotspur Stadium, London, England | For WBO cruiserweight title |
| 15 | Win | 15–0 | (Croatia) Tomislav Rudan | TKO | 4 (6), 2:05 | 22 May 2021 | Splendid Hotel, Budva, Montenegro | |
| 14 | Win | 14–0 | (Bosnia and Herzegovina) Edin Puhalo | TKO | 9 (12), 2:00 | 23 Oct 2020 | Studio GSP Garage, Belgrade, Serbia | |
| 13 | Win | 13–0 | (Brazil) Jackson Dos Santos | RTD | 3 (8), 3:00 | 7 Dec 2019 | Altes Hallenbad, Hamelin, Germany | |
| 12 | Win | 12–0 | (Germany) Rad Rashid | UD | 8 | 10 Nov 2019 | Hala Moraca, Podgorica, Montenegro | |
| 11 | Win | 11–0 | (Argentina) Juan Ezequiel Basualdo | TKO | 2 (10), 2:16 | 29 Mar 2019 | Splendid Hotel, Budva, Montenegro | |
| 10 | Win | 10–0 | (Ghana) Abraham Tabul | TKO | 8 (10), 0:48 | 13 Jul 2018 | Kanli Kula, Herceg Novi, Montenegro | |
| 9 | Win | 9–0 | (Germany) Angelo Venjakob | KO | 1 (10), 1:48 | 2 Jun 2018 | Stadionsporthalle, Hanover, Germany | Retained WBO Youth cruiserweight title |
| 8 | Win | 8–0 | (Hungary) Máté Kristóf | KO | 2 (10), 1:54 | 13 Apr 2018 | Splendid Hotel, Budva, Montenegro | Won vacant WBO Youth cruiserweight title |
| 7 | Win | 7–0 | (Hungary) József Kormány | TKO | 2 (8), 1:23 | 4 Feb 2018 | Csigahaz Muvelodesi Kozpont, Kistarcsa, Hungary | |
| 6 | Win | 6–0 | (Bosnia and Herzegovina) Dražan Janjanin | TKO | 2 (6), 1:18 | 5 Jan 2018 | Hala Pendik, Novi Pazar, Serbia | |
| 5 | Win | 5–0 | (Serbia) Siniša Kondić | TKO | 3 (6), 1:12 | 22 Dec 2017 | Sportski Centr, Nikšić, Montenegro | |
| 4 | Win | 4–0 | (Romania) Ionut Damian | PTS | 6 | 2 Dec 2017 | Rattenfanger Halle, Hamelin, Germany | |
| 3 | Win | 3–0 | (Bosnia and Herzegovina) Anel Hodžić | TKO | 1 (4), 1:43 | 17 Nov 2017 | Sport Hall, Banovići, Bosnia and Herzegovina | |
| 2 | Win | 2–0 | (Germany) Rene Proft | KO | 1 (4), 0:56 | 21 Oct 2017 | Stadthalle, Holzminden, Germany | |
| 1 | Win | 1–0 | (Serbia) Aleksandar Petrović | PTS | 4 | 25 Oct 2014 | Mediterranean Sports Centre, Budva, Montenegro | |

== Bare knuckle boxing record ==
Professional record breakdown
| 1 match | 1 win | 0 losses |
| By knockout | 1 | 0 |

| Res. | Record | Opponent | Method | Event | Date | Round | Time | Location | Notes |
|---|---|---|---|---|---|---|---|---|---|
| Win | 1–0 | Mark Flanagan | TKO (referee stoppage) | BKFC Fight Night Australia: Hepi vs. Wiśniewski 2 | 18 April 2026 | 1 | 2:00 | Townsville, Australia | |
